= Maimun Zubair =

Indonesian cleric and politician (1928–2019)

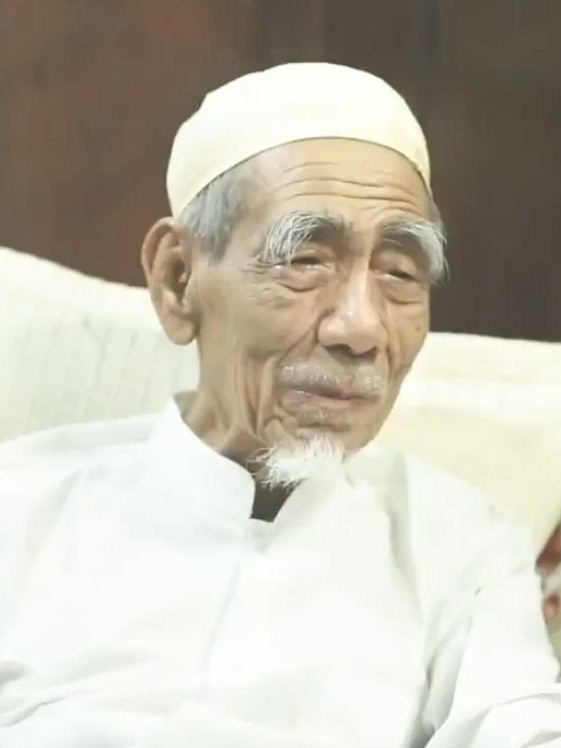
- Maimun Zubair in 2018 at his residence

Personal life
- Born: 28 October 1928 Karangmangu, Sarang, Rembang, Central Java, Dutch East Indies
- Died: 6 August 2019 (aged 90) Mecca, Saudi Arabia
- Buried: Jannat al-Mu'alla
- Parents: Zubair Dahlan (father); Mahmudah Ahmad (mother)
- Political party: United Development Party

Religious life
- Religion: Islam
- Jurisprudence: Shafi'i

Muslim leader
- Organization: Nahdlatul Ulama

Maimun Zubair, (Note: also spelled Maimoen Zubair; Jawi: ميمون زبير) also called Mbah Moen, was an Indonesian cleric and politician.

He was a scholar in Islamic modernism known for having promoted Indonesian nationalism and teaching Islam, discussing the evolution of nationalism while applying Quranic verses to social, political, and religious events in Indonesia.

Maimun often preached Islam Nusantara, a view held by Nahdlatul Ulama, in which "there is no need for Muslims to establish a caliphate" in Indonesia, because the country and its Pancasila state ideology were already established on Islamic ideals, he said that although extremist groups may threaten unity by seeking an Islamic state, Indonesia its committed to nationalism supported by religious principles.

== Early life ==
Maimun was born in Karangmangu, Rembang, Central Java, on October 28, 1928, a date coinciding with Youth Pledge, which was later established in 1967 as Youth Pledge Day, during the Indonesian National Awakening, a period which was under the Dutch colonization of Indonesia.

== Career ==
Because he was raised in a pesantren Islamic boarding school tradition, he learned from his grandfather, and from his father, Zubair Dahlan, a scholar.

At around 17 years old, he learned Arabic grammar, Mantiq, Balagha, and other Islamic sciences concerning Fiqh. He memorized various Arabic Islamic texts like Al-Ajurrumiyya and Alfiyya of Ibn Malik, along with his expertise in discussing Fiqh books of the Shafi'i school.

In 1945, he studied for approximately five years at Pondok Pesantren Lirboyo, a school founded by his teacher Abdul Karim, before travelling to Mecca in 1950 for two years with his grandfather, where he learned from Saudi Arabian scholars like Alawi bin Abbas al-Maliki, Yasin al-Fadani, and Hasan bin Muhammad Mashat at the age of 21. He has also studied Sufism.

Upon returning to his hometown in Sarang, he continued his studies with various Javanese scholars such as Ali Maksum, Mustofa Bisri, Abdul Wahab Hasbullah, Ahmad Baidhawi Asro, and Sahal Mahfudh.

Maimun's words were also written in Arabic books like al-Ulama al-Mujaddidun, (Note: Arabic: العلماء المجددون) a seminal book completed in 2007 covering the concept of Ijtihad, and Tajdid.

== Pondok Pesantren al-Anwar ==
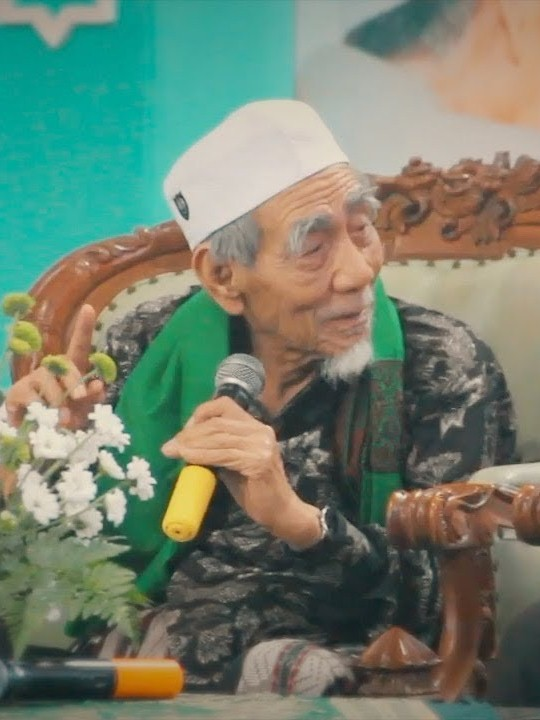
Maimun Zubair in 2017

In 1965, he founded the al-Anwar Islamic Boarding School, located next to his residence, which was welcomed by the local community. Maimun's children contributed to Al Anwar Islamic boarding schools (1–4), providing kitab kuning to around 10,000 students with specific management for male and female students after his death.

Maimun spoke in Javanese during his teaching sessions; his books, Safīnatu Kallā Saya’lamūn fī Tafsīr Maimun Zubair, (Note: Arabic: سفينة كلاً سيعلمون في تفسير ميمون زبير) influenced by the critical discourse analysis of Teun A. Van Dijk, and Nuṣūṣ al-Akhyār fī al-Ṣawm wa al-Ifṭār, (Note: Arabic: نصوص الأخيار في الصوم والإفطار) were translated by his students into Arabic and English.

== Political life ==
In addition to maintaining his Islamic boarding school, he served as a member of the Regional House of Representatives of Rembang Regency for seven years (1971–1978) before focusing on running his Islamic boarding school again. He served three terms as a member of the People's Consultative Assembly, representing Central Java from 1987 until 1999, while also being active in Nahdlatul Ulama from 1985 to 1990.

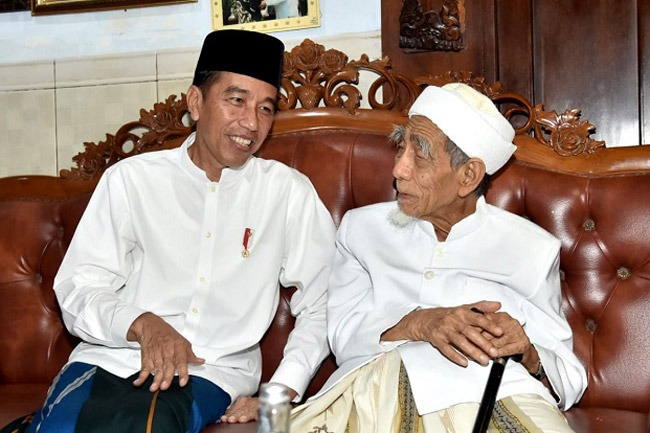
Joko Widodo and Maimun Zubair

He also served as Chairman of the Advisory Council of the United Development Party from 1995 to 1999. In 2004, he began to serve as the Chairman of the Sharia Council, being a supporter and advisor to Joko Widodo since 2014, holding the position until his death. Although many Nahdlatul Ulama-affiliated parties like PKB and PPP members initially voted for Prabowo Subianto in the 2014 presidential election, Joko Widodo secured their support during his mandate by introducing empowerment programs and passing the Pesantren Bill for greater legal recognition. This resulted in less open support for Prabowo compared to 2014.

Before the 2019 election, Maimun came under controversy for mistakenly praying for Prabowo to succeed Widodo as the country's leader in a letter while sitting next to Jokowi at the cleric's boarding school in Rembang. Joko Widodo's visit to the school was his second, following his first on 4 May 2014. Maimun later stated that he mispronounced the name because of his age. Fadli Zon, a Prabowo supporter, wrote a poem that mocked the event criticizing the United Development Party organizers who he believed were "manipulating" him for a staged endorsement of Joko Widodo. Thousands of santris in Kudus Regency protested peacefully against Fadli Zon's satirical poem.

== Personal life ==
With his first wife, he had two sons and one daughter. From his second wife, he had six sons and one daughter, one of them is Taj Yasin Maimoen, a United Development Party politician. After his first and second wives died, he married a third wife.

Maimun considered living in a modest home a sign of respect to the lifestyle of the Prophet Muhammad, believing it would affect Quran recitation and dishonor the Prophet's small house. He refrained from building a larger house, maintaining his simple home in Al-Anwar Islamic boarding school complex until his death, not due to financial constraints or religious prohibitions.

== Death ==
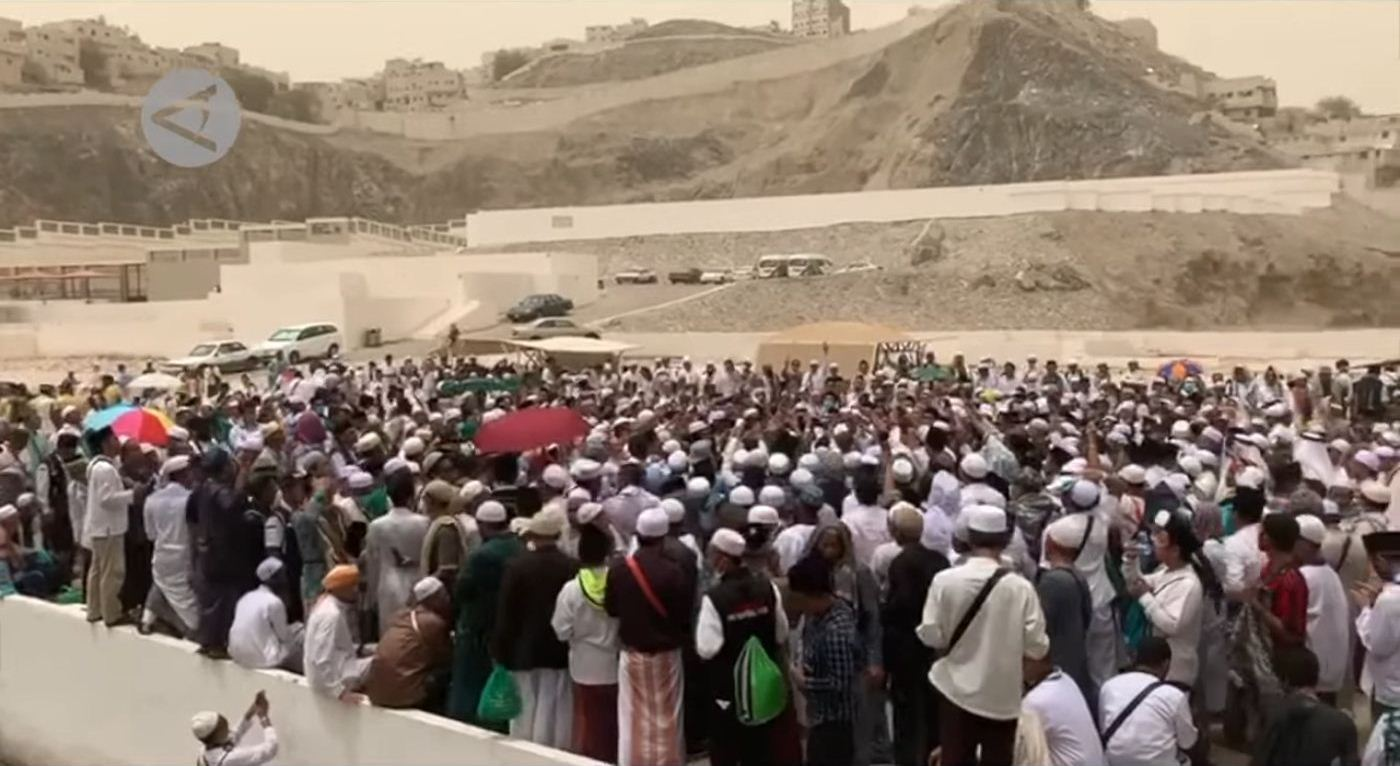
Funeral of Maimun Zubair, after the Dhuhr prayer, in Jannat al-Mu'alla

Maimun died at 90 years old, on 6 August 2019, before dawn, in Mecca, after an invitation from the Saudi Government, a few days before performing the Hajj. He was buried in Ma'la Cemetery after being hospitalized to al-Noor Hospital.

The funeral involved the Minister of Religious Affairs Lukman Hakim Saifuddin and the ambassador of Indonesia to Saudi Arabia. It was attended by Indonesian politicians like Zulkifli Hasan, and Fahri Hamzah, and also by the Amirul Hajj. Many expressed his condolences, particularly President Joko Widodo.
