= California University =

California University may refer to:

== Public ==
- University of California, a public university system in California, United States
  - Campuses: Berkeley, Davis, Irvine, Los Angeles, Merced, Riverside, San Diego, San Francisco, Santa Barbara, Santa Cruz
  - Regents of the University of California, the governing board of the university system
  - University of California Press, the academic publishing company of the university system
- California State University, a public university system in California, United States
  - List of 23 campuses
- California Community Colleges, a public community college system in California, United States
  - List of 115 colleges
- Pennsylvania Western University, California, a public university in California, Pennsylvania; formerly California University of Pennsylvania

== Private ==
- California University of Management and Sciences, a private university in Anaheim, California
- California University of Management and Technology, a private unaccredited tertiary education provider in Sunnyvale, California.
- California University of Science and Medicine, a private medical school in San Bernardino, California
- Marymount California University, a defunct private Catholic university in Rancho Palos Verdes, California
- California Miramar University, a private for-profit university in San Diego, California
- California Lutheran University, a private university in Thousand Oaks, California
- Dominican University of California, a private university in San Rafael, California

== See also ==
- California College (disambiguation)
- List of colleges and universities in California
- California (disambiguation)
- Fictional universities featured in television shows and movies including Beverly Hills, 90210, Saved by the Bell: The College Years, Legally Blonde, The L Word, We Bare Bears, Grown-ish, Fuller House and Moesha.
