= Ma'ruf Amin =

Vice President of Indonesia from 2019 to 2024

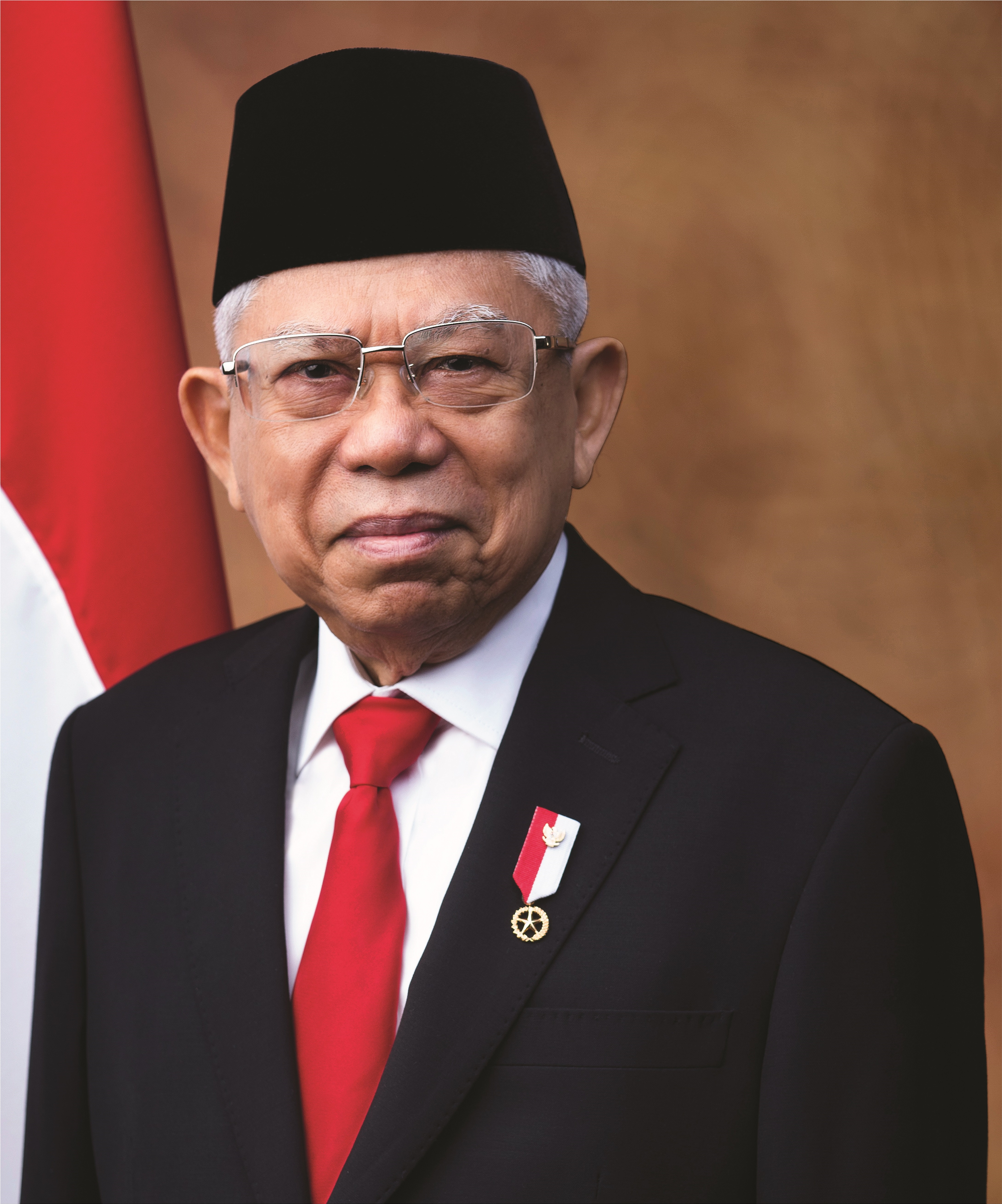
- Official portrait, 2019

13th Vice President of Indonesia
- In office 20 October 2019 – 20 October 2024
- President: Joko Widodo
- Preceded by: Jusuf Kalla
- Succeeded by: Gibran Rakabuming Raka

Chairman of the Indonesian Ulama Council
- In office 27 August 2015 – 27 November 2020; Inactive from 20 October 2019
- Preceded by: Din Syamsuddin
- Succeeded by: Zainut Tauhid Sa'adi (acting); Yunahar Ilyas (acting); Miftachul Achyar

Supreme Leader of the Nahdlatul Ulama
- In office 6 August 2015 – 22 September 2018
- Preceded by: Mustofa Bisri
- Succeeded by: Miftachul Achyar

Groups represented in the Jakarta Regional House of Representatives
- 1971–1973: Groups of Nahdlatul Ulama
- 1973–1982: United Development Party

Groups represented in House of Representatives
- 1997–1998: United Development Party
- 1998–2004: National Awakening Party

Other government roles
- 2007–2014: Member of Presidential Advisory Council
- 2017–2019: Member of BPIP Steering Committee

Personal details
- Born: Ma'ruf al-Kharki; 11 March 1943 (age 83) Tangerang, Japanese East Indies
- Party: PKB (1998–2006, 2024–present)
- Other political affiliations: PPP (1973–1998); PKNU (2006–2011); Independent (2011–2024)
- Spouses: Siti Churiyah (m. 1964; died 2013); Wury Estu Handayani (m. 2014)
- Children: 9 children
- Education: Tebuireng Islamic Boarding School
- Alma mater: Bogor Ibn Khaldun University; Jakarta Ibn Khaldun University; Maulana Malik Ibrahim State Islamic University Malang (honorary, 2017)
- Occupation: Politician; cleric; lecturer
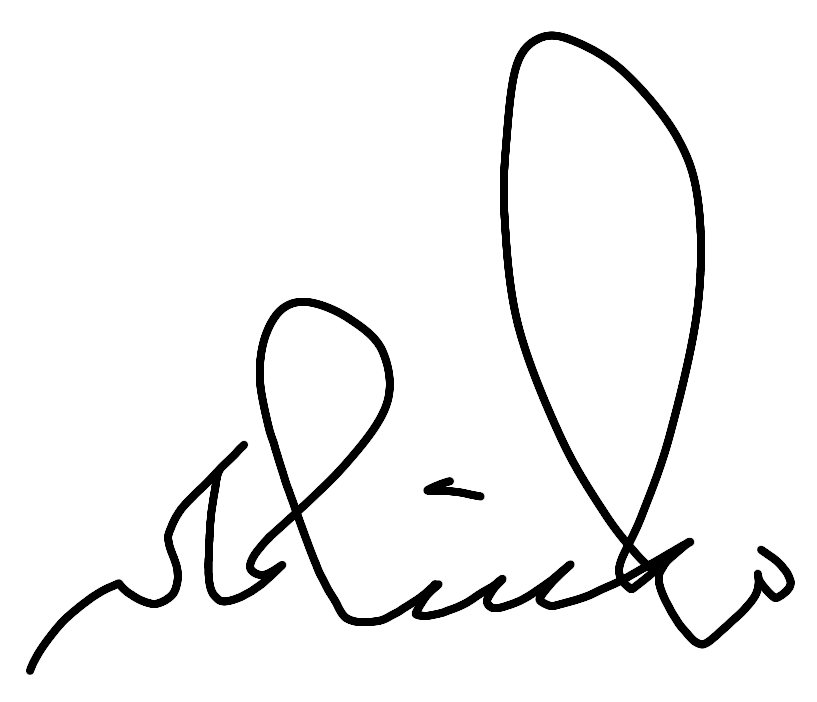
- Signature

Ma'ruf Amin (born 11 March 1943) is an Indonesian politician, Islamic cleric, and lecturer who served as the 13th vice president of Indonesia from 2019 to 2024. Aged nearly 77 years old when inaugurated, he is the oldest Indonesian vice president to ever be sworn in.

He was the chairman of the Indonesian Ulama Council (Majelis Ulama Indonesia, or MUI) when he accepted the vice-presidential nomination. On 9 August 2018, President Joko Widodo announced that Ma'ruf would be his running mate in the 2019 Indonesian presidential election. Following his candidacy, he resigned as General Leader (rais 'aam syuriah) of Nahdlatul Ulama (NU), the world's largest Islamic organization.

== Early life and career ==
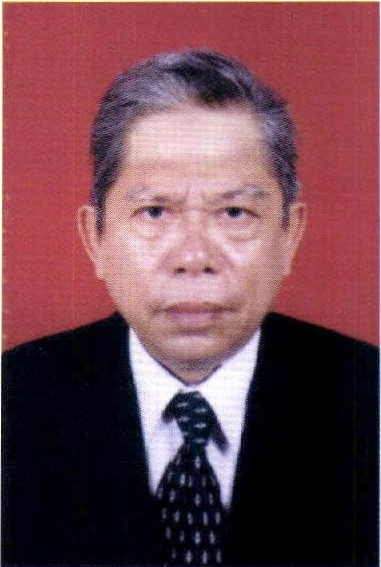
Official portrait of Ma'ruf Amin as a member of the People's Representative Council in 1999

Ma'ruf Amin was born during the Japanese occupation of the Dutch East Indies to Mohamad Amin and Maimunah. He first went to primary school in the kecamatan of Kresek. He continued his studies at Pesantren Tebuireng in Jombang, East Java, an influential Islamic boarding school established by NU founder Hasyim Asy'ari. Later, he received a bachelor's degree in Islamic philosophy from Ibnu Khaldun University in Bogor, West Java.

Shortly after graduating from college, Ma'ruf carried out dakwah missions in Jakarta. At that time, NU was still an active political party and Ma'ruf was elected to the Indonesian parliament, the People's Representative Council (or DPR, Dewan Perwakilan Rakyat) in the national election held in 1971. Six years later, in 1977, he was elected to the Jakarta City Council as a member of the United Development Party (Partai Persatuan Pembangunan or PPP) for one term (1977–1982) and served as leader of the PPP caucus. At the end of his term, Ma'ruf returned to academia and social activism. In 1989, he was appointed as a katib 'aam, a senior position within NU's syuriah, its supreme governing council. He then rose to be one of the rais, a leader, overseeing the executive leadership of Abdurrahman Wahid.

Following the fall of Suharto in 1998, Ma'ruf became an advisor to Wahid's National Awakening Party (Partai Kebangkitan Bangsa, or PKB) and advised Wahid throughout the period of his presidency of Indonesia from 1999 to 2001. Ma'ruf returned to active politics and represented the PKB in the national DPR from 1999 to 2004. During this second term in the DPR, Ma'ruf was chair of the Fourth Commission (agriculture, food, and maritime affairs) as well as member of the Second Commission (government affairs and regional autonomy) and Budgetary Board.

While a member of the DPR during 1999–2004, Ma'ruf chaired the Ulama Council's committee in charge of issuing legal opinions (fatwa). He did not seek re-election to the DPR in 2004 and returned to the Indonesian Ulama Council (MUI) to chair its National Sharia Committee (acting from 2004 to 2010). He also served as an advisor to President Susilo Bambang Yudhoyono in his Presidential Advisory Council from 2007 to 2014.

In 2015, Ma'ruf ran for the position of rais 'aam syuriah of the NU, equivalent to chair of the supreme governing council. He finished in second place after the incumbent Ahmad Mustofa Bisri from Rembang's Pesantren Raudlatuth Thalibin. In a significant development, Bisri withdrew his name from the race, and Ma'ruf was then elected to the position by NU's 33rd Congress.

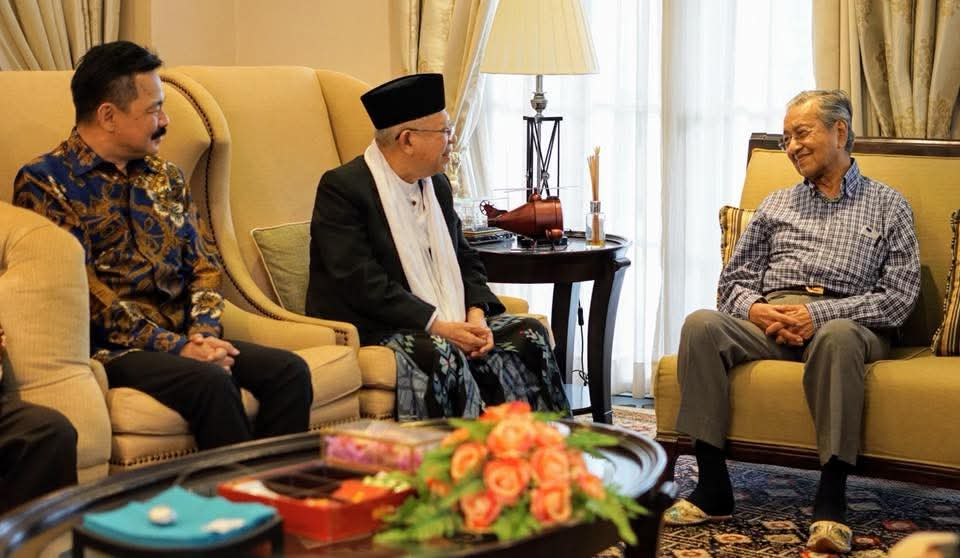
On 8 September 2018, Ma'ruf (center) met with Malaysian Prime Minister Mahathir Mohamad (right) in Kuala Lumpur

Several weeks after his ascendancy to NU's highest post, Ma'ruf was elected to be the chair of MUI, succeeding Muhammadiyah's Din Syamsuddin on 27 August 2015.

== Vice-presidential candidacy and victory ==
President Joko Widodo announced that he would run for re-election in the 2019 presidential election. His vice president Jusuf Kalla was not eligible for another term because of the term limits set for the positions of president and vice president. (Jusuf Kalla had already served a five-year term as vice president under Yudhoyono from 2004 to 2009.) Speculation as to who Jokowi might select as his running mate focused on several candidates including Mahfud MD, a former defence minister and chief justice of the Constitutional Court.

On 9 August, in a surprise move, Widodo announced that Ma'ruf would be his running mate. Mahfud had been reported to be preparing himself to become Jokowi's vice-presidential candidate but, following a push by several constituent parties of Widodo's governing coalition and influential Islamic figures, Ma'ruf was selected instead. Explaining his decision, Jokowi referred to Ma'ruf's extensive experience in government and religious affairs.

The General Elections Commission announced Widodo and Ma'ruf's victory, with the pair securing 55.5 percent of the votes, on 21 May 2019, though Ma'ruf's status as vice-president-elect was pending any lawsuits to the Constitutional Court.

== Vice presidency ==
Ma'ruf was sworn in as vice president on 20 October 2019. Aged 76 years and 223 days when inaugurated, he is the oldest-ever Indonesian vice president to be sworn in. During his Vice Presidency, Ma'ruf is known to be working on issues such as halal economy and its industry, eradication of stunting with the policy coordination of this issue is also overseen by the Vice President Secretariat, religious affairs, and was active in visiting several provinces across Indonesia.

== Views ==
As MUI chair, Ma'ruf gave his support to regulations prohibiting pornography and supported a decree banning Ahmadiya activities. In addition, Ma'ruf "regretted" the Constitutional Court's ruling to reject a proposed ban on sexual activities of homosexuals in 2017, instead wanting "stern regulations".

In 2012, Ma'ruf also issued a recommendation that Muslims not say Merry Christmas, citing the controversy associated with the saying. However, in 2018, he noted that there was never an explicit ban of saying Christmas greetings issued by MUI, after a video of him saying Merry Christmas circulated. Ma'ruf similarly supported prohibiting Valentine's Day, claiming that its celebration would "only cause a fuss and destroy norms and morality", though he does not believe that every region in Indonesia must ban it.

On Islamic terrorism, Ma'ruf stated that suicide bombers are not martyrs (shahid), and that the present time is the era for intellectual instead of physical warfare. During the debates for the 2019 presidential election, he emphasized the importance of deradicalization in counterterrorism.

In June 2022, Ma'ruf recommended the Indonesian Ulama Council to issue a fatwa which would permit the use of cannabis for medical purposes.

== Controversies ==
=== Ahok affair ===
Ma'ruf was embroiled in part of the controversy surrounding the contentious Jakarta gubernatorial election in 2017. The then-Jakarta governor Basuki Tjahaja Purnama, widely known as "Ahok", became the target of numerous protests in Jakarta in November 2016. In response, Ahok alleged that Ma'ruf had taken sides in the election due to a phone call with former president Susilo Bambang Yudhoyono, whose son Agus Harimurti Yudhoyono was running against Ahok in the election. Ahok later apologized to Ma'ruf via social media for any implication that Ma'ruf had been influenced by political pressure.

Ma'ruf accepted Ahok's apology, saying that the matter was resolved. Despite Ma'ruf's willingness to let the matter rest, an organization known as the Indonesian Young Entrepreneurs reported Ahok to the criminal investigation unit of the Indonesian National Police for allegedly having harassed Ma'ruf and wiretapped his phone conversations with former President Yudhoyono despite previous denials by Ahok's legal team of the latter act.

In a separate interview, conducted after his selection as a vice-presidential candidate, Ma'ruf stated that he regretted testifying against Ahok and added that he was "forced" to do so because he is enforcing the law.

== Personal life ==
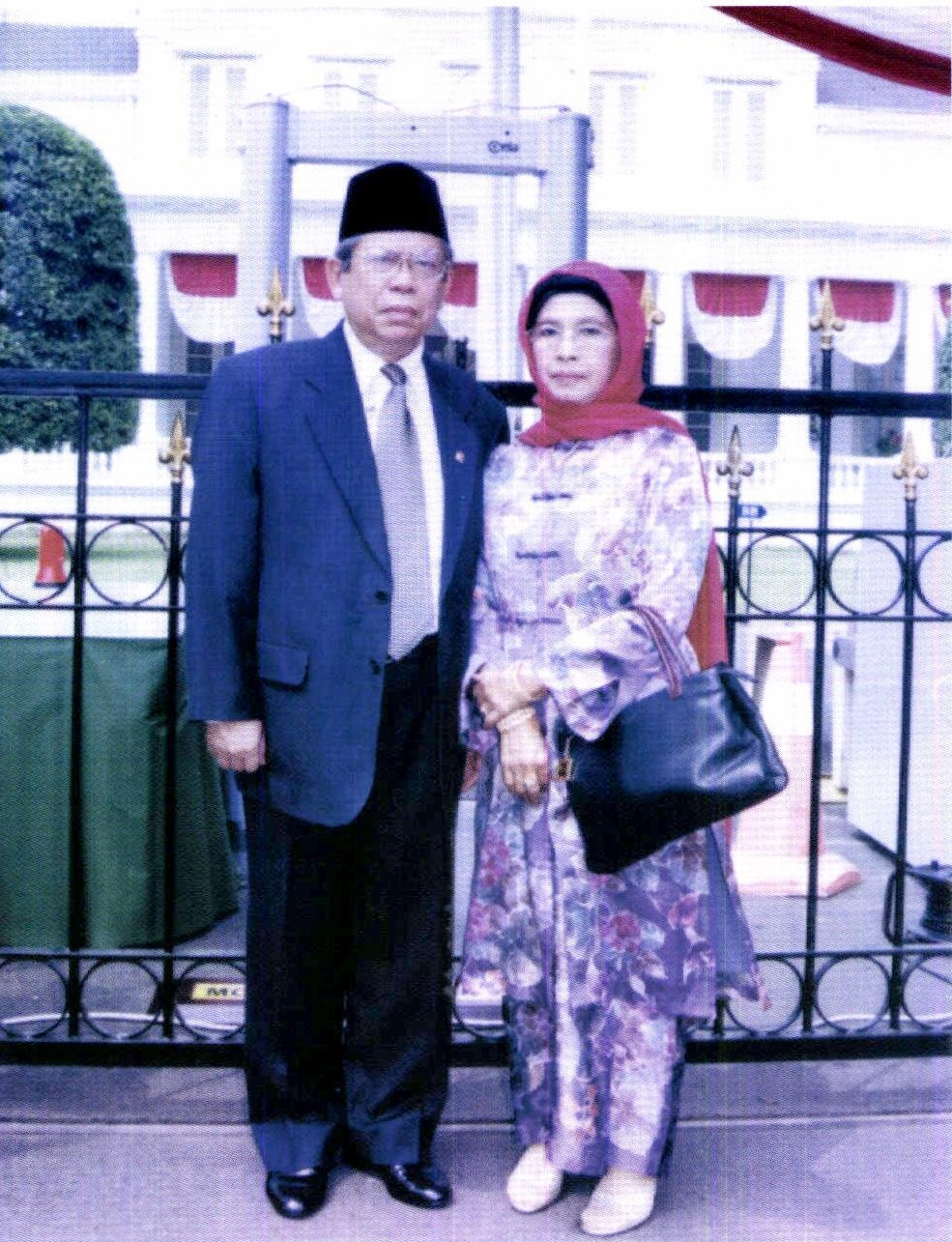
Portrait of Ma'ruf Amin and his first wife, Siti Churiyah.

Ma'ruf's first wife, Siti Churiyah, died on 22 October 2013 at the age of 67. From the 49-year marriage, they had nine children and 13 grandchildren. Seven months later, on 31 May 2014, he married Wury Estu Handayani who had been a widow for around two years. They were married in a private ceremony at the well-known Sunda Kelapa Mosque in Menteng, Central Jakarta.

Ma'ruf is a fan of association football. He previously supported Manchester United, but after a few years of poor performances by the club, Ma'ruf switched his allegiance to its archrival Liverpool in 2019.

== Decorations ==
As the vice president of Indonesia, Ma'ruf is automatically bestowed the highest class of six out of seven civilian Star Decorations (Indonesian: Tanda Kehormatan Bintang), namely:

- Star of the Republic of Indonesia, 2nd Class (Indonesian: Bintang Republik Indonesia Adipradana; 22 October 2019)
- Star of Mahaputera, 1st Class (Indonesian: Bintang Mahaputera Adipurna; 22 October 2019)
- Star of Mahaputera, 2nd Class (Indonesian: Bintang Mahaputera Adipradana; 13 August 2014)
- Star of Service, 1st Class (Indonesian: Bintang Jasa Utama; 22 October 2019)
- Star of Humanity (Indonesian: Bintang Kemanusiaan; 22 October 2019)
- Star of Democracy Upholder, 1st Class (Indonesian: Bintang Penegak Demokrasi Utama; 22 October 2019)
- Star of Culture Parama Dharma (Indonesian: Bintang Budaya Parama Dharma; 22 October 2019)
- Star of Bhayangkara, 1st Class (Indonesian: Bintang Bhayangkara Utama; 2019)

Political offices
Preceded by Jusuf Kalla	Vice President of Indonesia; 20 October 2019 – 20 October 2024	Succeeded by Gibran Rakabuming Raka
Non-profit organization positions
Preceded by Din Syamsuddin	Chairman of the Indonesian Ulama Council; 2015–2020	Succeeded by Miftachul Achyar
Preceded by Mustofa Bisri	General Leader of Nahdlatul Ulama; 2015–2018	Succeeded by Miftachul Achyar
