= Dahlan =

Dahlan may refer to:

== People ==
- Ahmad Dahlan (1868-1923), founder of Indonesian Muslim organisation Muhammadiyah
- Dahlan Iskan, Indonesian businessperson and Minister of State-owned Enterprises
- Malika Dahlan, a fictional character from the British soap opera Doctors
- Mohammed Dahlan (born 1961), Palestinian political figure
- Zubair Dahlan (1905–1969), Indonesian cleric

== Places ==
- Dahlan, Iran, a village in East Azerbaijan Province, Iran
- Dehlan, Himachal Pradesh, A village located in Himachal Pradesh, India
