= Din Syamsuddin =

Indonesian politician

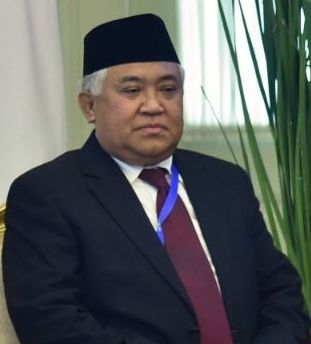
- Syamsuddin in 2018

14th Chairman of Muhammadiyah
- In office 8 July 2005 – 6 August 2015
- Preceded by: Ahmad Syafi'i Maarif
- Succeeded by: Haedar Nashir

6th Chairman of Indonesian Ulama Council
- In office 18 February 2014 – 27 August 2015
- Preceded by: Sahal Mahfudh
- Succeeded by: Ma'ruf Amin

Vice Chairman of Indonesian Ulama Council
- In office 28 July 2005 – 18 February 2014
- Succeeded by: Ma'ruf Amin

Personal details
- Born: 31 August 1958 (age 68) Sumbawa, West Nusa Tenggara, Indonesia
- Party: Pelita (since 2022)
- Other political affiliations: Golkar (before 1999); Independent (1999–2022)
- Spouse(s): Fira Beranata (m. 1986; died 2010) Novalinda Jonafrianty (m. 2011; div. 2020) Rashda Diana (m. 2021)
- Children: 3
- Parents: Syamsuddin Abdullah (father); Rohana Syamsuddin (mother)
- Education: Pondok Modern Darussalam Gontor
- Alma mater: IAIN Syarif Hidayatullah; California University
- Occupation: Ulama; politician

Muhammad Sirajuddin "Din" Syamsuddin (Arabic: مُحَمَّدُ سِرَاجِ ٱلدِّينِ شَمْسِ ٱلدِّينِ, romanized: Muḥammad Sirāj ad-Dīn Šams ad-Dīn, born in Sumbawa, West Nusa Tenggara, August 31, 1958 (age 68)), is an Indonesian politician and formerly the Chairman of Muhammadiyah for two terms from 2005 to 2010 and 2010 to 2015. His wife was named Fira Beranata and has 3 children. He was entrusted as the Chairman of the Indonesian Ulema Council (Majelis Ulama Indonesia, MUI) Center, he previously served as Vice Chairman of the Indonesian Ulema Council replacing Center Dr (HC), KH. Sahal Mahfouz, who died on Friday, January 24, 2014.

== Career ==
- Chairman of Muhammadiyah (2005–2015)
- Chairman of the Center for Dialogue and Cooperation Among Civilizations / CDCC (2007–present)
- Member, Strategic Alliance Russia-based Islamic World (2006–present)
- Member, UK-Indonesia Islamic Advisory Group (2006–present)
- Chairman, World Peace Forum / WPF (2006–present)
- Honorary President, World Conference on Religions for Peace / WCRP, based in New York (2006–present)
- Vice Chairman of the MUI (2005–2010)
- Vice Chairman of the Central Advisory Board of ICMI (2005–2010)
- Vice Secretary General, World Islamic People's Leadership, based in Tripoli (2005–present)
- Member, World Council of World Islamic Call Society, based in Tripoli (2005–present)
- President, Asian Committee on Religions for Peace / ACRP, based in Tokyo (2004–present)
- Chairman, Indonesian Committee on Religions for Peace / IComRP (2000–present)
- General Secretary of the Indonesian Ulema Council (MUI, 2000–2005)
- Vice Chairman of Muhammadiyah (2000–2005)
- Vice Chairman of the MPR-RI Works Development (1999)
- Golkar Deputy Secretary General (1998–2000)
- Deputy Secretary Faction MPR Development Works (1998)
- Directorate General of Employment, DEPNAKER RI (1998–2000)
- Chairman of the Department of Research and Development Golkar (1993–1998)
- Members of the National Research Council (1993–1998)
- Secretary of ICMI Center Advisory Board (1990–1995)
- Vice Chairman of the Indonesian Youth Assembly (1990–1993)
- Chairman of PP Muhammadiyah Youth (1989–1993)
- DPP Chairman of Muhammadiyah Students Association (IMM, 1985)
- Lecturer / Professor of UIN Syarif Hidayatullah Jakarta (1982–present)
- Lecturer in various universities (ISTA, UHAMKA, UI, 1982–2000)
- Chairman of the Department of Islamic Theology Student Senate, IAIN Jakarta (1980–1982)
- Chairman IPNU Sumbawa Branch (1970–1972).

Din Syamsuddin in Harun Kamil home

As chairman of Muhammadiyah, he is often invited to attend a wide variety of international conferences with regard to the relationship between religion and peace. Most recently, for example, he was invited to the Vatican to give a public lecture about terrorism in the context of politics and ideology. He believes that terrorism is more relevant when associated with political issues than the issue of ideology. In line with that, he also was not happy when some Muslim groups used the label of Islam in performing terrorist actions. According to him, acts of terrorism in the name of Islam is very much detrimental to Muslims both at the internal level and Muslims on a global scale.

Din Shams is seen as a leader of Muslims not only because he is the Chairman of Muhammadiyah, but even more so because of his ability to engage in dialogue with all elements of both faiths among Muslims, as well as with other religious communities.

Shamsuddin-Din was one of the passengers in Garuda Indonesia Flight 200 which crashed while landing in Yogyakarta in June 2007. He suffered minor injuries in the crash that killed 21 people.

== Being Chairman of the Indonesian Ulema Council Center ==
Official So Din Shamsuddin became new chairman of MUI. Din replaced Sahal Mahfouz who died on Friday, January 24, 2014. Decision on the replacement set MUI leadership meeting held on Tuesday, February 18, 2014. These results were talked about in a plenary meeting and made a decision as soon as possible. But the new chairman definitively applied per Tuesday, February 18, 2014.

== Honours ==
=== Foreign ===
- Italy :
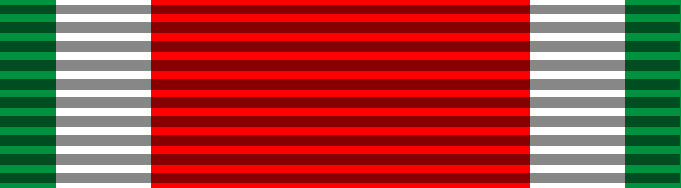
  - Knight of the Order of the Star of Italy (11 November 2013)
- Japan :
  - Order of the Rising Sun, Gold and Silver Star (6 November 2018)

Non-profit organization positions
Preceded by Sahal Mahfudh	Chairman of the Indonesian Ulema Council; 2014–2015	Succeeded by Ma'ruf Amin
Preceded by Ahmad Syafi'i Maarif	Chairman of Muhammadiyah; 2005–2015	Succeeded by Haedar Nashir
