= Sudhamek Agung Waspodo Sunyoto =

Indonesian billionaire

Sudhamek Agung Waspodo Soenjoto
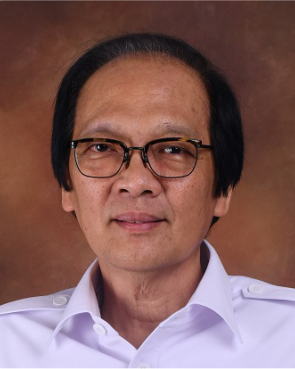

Member of National Research and Innovation Agency Steering Committee
- Incumbent
- Assumed office 13 October 2021
- President: Joko Widodo
- Head of Steering Committee: Megawati Soekarnoputri

Member of Pancasila Ideology Development Agency Steering Committee
- Incumbent
- Assumed office 7 July 2017
- President: Joko Widodo
- Head of Steering Committee: Megawati Soekarnoputri

Member of National Industry Economy Committee
- Incumbent
- Assumed office 19 January 2016
- President: Joko Widodo
- Head: Soetrisno Bachir

Head of Supervisory Body of Majelis Buddhayana Indonesia
- Incumbent
- Assumed office 2013

Personal details
- Born: Rembang, Jawa Tengah, Indonesia
- Party: Independent
- Education: Universitas Kristen Satya Wacana

Sudhamek Agung Waspodo Sunyoto (Indonesian old spelling, Sudhamek Agoeng Waspodo Soenjoto. Also known as Sudhamek or Sudhamek AWS) is an Indonesian billionaire and a member of the Pancasila Ideology Development Agency Steering Committee since 7 June 2017. Prior this appointment, he was Chairman of Garudafood Group. He, as of 2022, is one of the 150 richest Indonesians. On 13 October 2021, he appointed as National Research and Innovation Agency Steering Committee member.

== Early life, education, and careers ==
Sudhamek was born from Chinese Indonesian family and last of 11 siblings. He is son of Darmo Putro, a Chinese, former Indonesian Revolutionary hero-turned-trader and later owner of PT. Tudung Putra Jaya, a small company at that time which trading tapioca flour, founded in 1958. Despite hailed from a quite financially well family, he was always bullied in school due to his unusual name given to him by his parents. Being bullied until high school resulted to his anxiety, trauma, and loss of confidence resulted in borderline marks during his school time.

Sudhamek regained his confidence after achieved best marks during his time as economy student at Universitas Kristen Satya Wacana (UKSW), Salatiga. Sudhamek was graduated from UKSW and obtained 2 degrees at nearly the same time. He obtained bachelor's degree in Economy in 1981 and bachelor's degree in Law on 1982 from UKSW. Despite his aspiration to continue his education to master's degree and went abroad, he did not afford it at that time due to financial limitation of his family. He later worked at Gudang Garam for more than 13 years, enriching his experience by-trade in business and management. He later returned to his family business and continuing it until finally become Garudafood Group.

On 23 January 2016, he granted doctor honoris causa in Economy from his almamater, UKSW.

Sudhamek is a Buddhist leader from the Indonesian Buddhayana movement.
