= Great Mosque of Central Java =

Mosque in Semarang, Central Java, Indonesia

- Masjid Agung Jawa Tengah
- Aerial view of the mosque from the Asmaul Husna Tower

- Location in Semarang

Religion
- Affiliation: Islam
- Branch/tradition: Sunni

Location
- Location: Semarang, Central Java, Indonesia
- Coordinates: 6°59′02″S 110°26′45″E

Architecture
- Architect: Ir. H. Ahmad Fanani
- Type: Mosque
- Style: Mix of Javanese, Arabic, and Greek
- Established: 2006
- Construction cost: Rp. 198,692,340,000 (US$ 22,000,000)

Specifications
- Capacity: 15,000
- Dome: 1
- Dome dia. (outer): 20 m (66 ft)
- Minaret: 4
- Minaret height: 62 m (203 ft)

Website
- masjidagungjateng.com/home

The Great Mosque of Central Java (Indonesian: Masjid Agung Jawa Tengah) is a mosque in the city of Semarang, Central Java, Indonesia.

== Layout ==
The interior

The mosque area covers 10 hectares (25 acres). There are three central buildings arranged in the shape of a U, with the domed mosque at the centre. All buildings have pitched, tiled roofs, while the central mosque has four minarets. The central roof resembles the roof of a "joglo", the traditional Javanese house, and symbolises the rising steps toward heaven or to gain God's blessing. The long buildings forming the arms of the U house are a library and auditorium respectively; The auditorium can hold up to 2,000 people.

In the central courtyard are six large hydraulically operated umbrellas, inspired by the ones at Al-Masjid al-Nabawi in Medina, which are used to protect worshippers; the six umbrellas represent the six tenets of iman. More than 15,000 worshippers can fit in the 7,669-square-metre (82,550 ft^{2}) prayer area. At the open end of the U is a series of Arabic-style arches, with Arabic calligraphs of 99 attributes of Allah, stood on 25 pillars, each representing one of the named prophets in Islam. Beyond the arches is an inscription on a 3.2-metre (10 ft) tall, 7.8 ton stone from Mount Merapi, designed by Nyoman M. Alim.

Nearby is the 99-metre-tall (325 ft) Asmaul Husna Tower, designed to resemble the minaret of Menara Kudus Mosque in Kudus; the height represents the 99 attributes of Allah. Used for calling Muslims to prayer, the tower also houses a radio station for da'wah and museum at its base and restaurant and observation deck near its summit. The upper levels are accessible by lift. On premises there is also a 23-room hotel.

== History ==
Preparations for the mosque's construction began on 6 June 2001, when the governor of Central Java formed the Coordination Team for the Construction of the Great Mosque (Tim Koordinasi Pembangunan Masjid Agung) which consisted of state bodies such as the provincial and city governments as well as private bodies such as the Indonesian Ulema Council (MUI). Of the waqf land once under the purview of the Kauman Mosque of Semarang, only the site at Jl. Gajah was deemed large enough. In September 2001 the team published a proposed construction schedule. Funding came from the provincial government.

Construction began on 6 September 2002, when minister of religion Said Agil Husin al-Munawar, head of MUI Sahal Mahfudz, and governor of Central Java Mardiyanto laid the first stake. While the mosque was still under construction, Chabib Thoha led Friday prayers on 19 March 2004. The mosque was dedicated on 14 November 2006 by President Susilo Bambang Yudhoyono and his wife.

The mosque is also a tourist attraction, with buses and trams available to transport visitors around the grounds.
