= San Diego College =

San Diego College may refer to the following in San Diego, California:

== Community colleges ==
- San Diego City College, public, two-year community college location in downtown San Diego
- San Diego Mesa College, public, two year community college located in the community of Clairemont Mesa
- San Diego Miramar College, public, two-year community college in the Miramar neighborhood

== Four-year colleges ==
- San Diego Christian College, private, evangelical Christian college in Santee
- California College San Diego, private college affiliated with the Center for Excellence in Higher Education

== See also ==
- University of San Diego, private Roman Catholic research university
- San Diego State University, public research university in the California State University system
- University of California, San Diego, public research university in the UC school system
- Education in San Diego
