= Ahmad Syafi'i Maarif =

Indonesian scholar and intellectual (1935–2022)

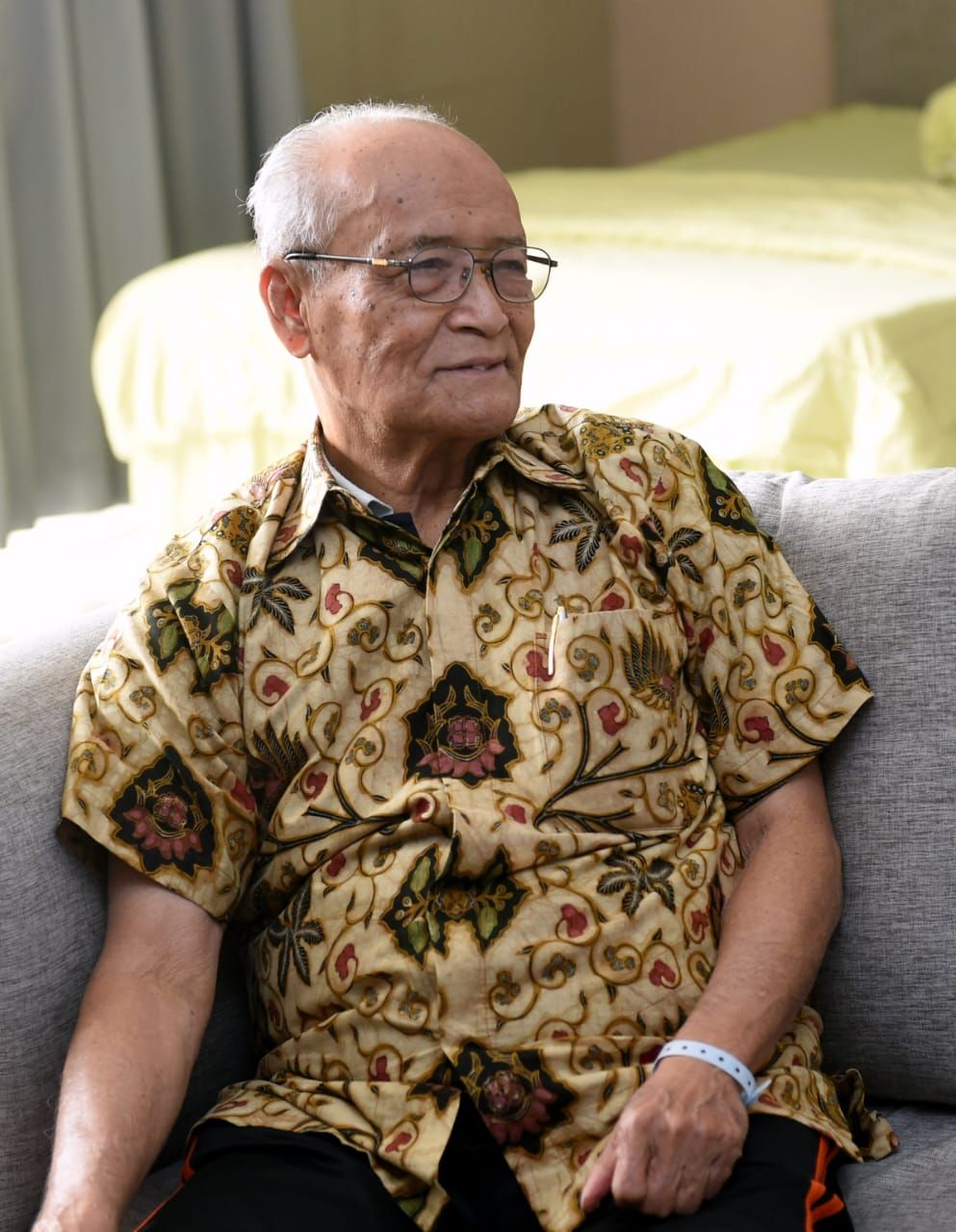
- Maarif in 2019

Chairman of Muhammadiyah
- In office 1998–2005
- Preceded by: Amien Rais
- Succeeded by: Din Syamsuddin

Personal details
- Born: 31 May 1935 Calau, Sijunjung, Dutch East Indies
- Died: 27 May 2022 (aged 86) Sleman, Yogyakarta Special Region, Indonesia
- Education: Yogyakarta State University; Ohio University; University of Chicago

Ahmad Syafi'i Maarif (31 May 1935 – 27 May 2022), popularly known as Buya Syafi'i, was an Indonesian Islamic scholar and intellectual. He was chairman of Muhammadiyah between 1998 and 2005. Educated in the United States, he was known for his moderate and progressive interpretation of Islam and his opposition to the direct influence of Islam in politics.

== Early life ==
Ahmad Syafi'i Maarif was born on 31 May 1935 in the Nagari of Calau, in the present-day Sumpur Kudus District of Sijunjung Regency in West Sumatra. He had four full siblings and 11 half-siblings. His father, Ma'rifah Rauf Datuk Rajo Malayu, was a gambier trader and the chief elder in his region. Maarif's mother died when he was a year old, and he was brought up by his aunt Bainah. In 1942, he enrolled at Sekolah Rakyat, a local elementary school open to native students under the colonial system. He studied Qur'an and Islamic lessons after school in a madrasa owned by Muhammadiyah, and Qur'an recitation in a surau in the evenings.

Maarif completed his elementary education in five years, one year fewer than the norm. However, he did not receive his graduation certificate due to the Indonesian National Revolution. Under the ensuing economic hardships his family experienced, he was unable to resume his education until 1950, when he again enrolled in a madrasa managed by Muhammadiyah, this time in Tanah Datar Regency. He studied there for three years and graduated. In 1953, at age 18, Maarif moved to Java with two cousins to continue his education. He initially wanted to enroll in a madrasa taught by Mohammad Sanusi Latief in Yogyakarta. However, he was not admitted as the class was at capacity.

== Further education and career ==
After he attempted to enroll, Maarif instead became a teacher in the madrasa, teaching Indonesian and English. At the same time, he and his cousin enrolled in a mechanical school, finishing the training in a few months. He was later accepted to the madrasa after submitting a new application, although he had to restart his studies from the middle school level. During his time there, Maarif was a youth member of Muhammadiyah's scouting organization, Hizbul Wathan. He was also an editor for Muhammadiyah's student magazine, Sinar. His father died on 5 October 1955, and he finished his education on 12 July 1956. Due to financial constraints, Maarif decided against pursuing further education at that time. At age 21, he was recruited as a teacher by the Muhammadiyah branch in Lombok. He taught in another Muhammadiyah-run school for approximately a year until March 1957, when he returned to his hometown. He then moved to Java to enter Cokroaminoto University in Surakarta, leaving as a baccalaureate (Note: Indonesian: sarjana muda) in 1964. He resumed his education at the Faculty of Social Science and Education at Yogyakarta State University, completing his bachelor's degree (Note: Indonesian: sarjana) in 1968.

While studying at university, he was active as a Qur'an recitation teacher and worked in a garment shop. After working in the shop for about a year, he opened his small shop and briefly worked as a volunteer teacher in Wonogiri Regency and Surakarta. He later became the editor of the Muhammadiyah-owned magazine, Suara Muhammadiyah, and a member of the Indonesian Journalists Association. He learned on the job at Suara Muhammadiyah, mentored by Mohammad Diponegoro. He then received a Fulbright Scholarship to study history at Ohio University in 1972, obtaining a master's degree in 1976. Supported by another scholarship, he went to the University of Chicago and obtained his doctorate in 1983, with a dissertation entitled Islam as the Basis of state : A Study of the Islamic Political Ideas as reflected in the Constituent Assembly debates in Indonesia.

After graduating from Chicago, Maarif returned to Indonesia as a lecturer. In 1996, he was appointed a professor of history at Yogyakarta State University, his alma mater. He was also a visiting lecturer at McGill University between 1993 and 1994, and at other universities in Malaysia and the United States. He was elected to the executive board of Muhammadiyah in 1990, and in 1995 became its vice-chairman. Following the fall of Suharto, Muhammadiyah's then-chairman Amien Rais resigned to take part in politics and run for president in the 1999 election. Maarif was appointed to replace him in 1998. He was elected for a full five-year term as chairman in 2000. During his tenure, he made efforts to distance the Muhammadiyah organization from day-to-day politics, especially from Rais' National Mandate Party. Muhammadiyah under Maarif also opposed motions by Islamic parties in the parliament to introduce Sharia laws into the Constitution of Indonesia.

After the end of his tenure as chairman, Maarif founded the Maarif Institute.

== Awards ==
He received the Ramon Magsaysay Award in 2008, and the Star of Mahaputera, 3rd class in 2015.

== Views ==
Adian Husaini, an Islamic scholar, considered Maarif a part of the Islamic liberalism movement, pointing to his studies under Fazlur Rahman Malik during his time in Chicago. Maarif had been introduced to Rahman by Rais while studying in Ohio, and Maarif gained admission to Chicago partly through this connection. Before his Chicago studies, Maarif's views were described by himself as "the Islamic fundamentalism of Masyumi and Mawdudi". After his time in Chicago, Maarif became a critic of an Islamic state model for Indonesia. He considered efforts by Islamic scholars to build a state out of an institutional structure within the Quran as "intellectual laziness". After his return to Indonesia, he gave lectures and wrote articles on his new views on Islam.

In an opinion piece dated 2 December 2016, he defended Basuki Tjahaja Purnama (more popularly known as Ahok), then-incumbent Governor of Jakarta, who was accused of blasphemy by some leading Muslims in Indonesia. He argued that Ahok did not insult Islam, in contrast to the viewpoint of most ulema who were members of the Indonesian Ulema Council.

== Personal life ==
Maarif married Nurkhalifah on 9 February 1965. He was a cycling enthusiast and a cook of Minangkabau cuisine by hobby.

== Death ==
Ahmad Syafi'i Maarif died on 27 May 2022 at Muhammadiyah Hospital in Sleman, Yogyakarta. His death was due to a heart attack, which he had also experienced on 14 May 2022 and in March. He was buried on the same day in the afternoon at Husnul Khotimah cemetery in Kulon Progo Regency. Immediately following his burial, several people from across the country including prominent politicians visited his grave.

== Explanatory notes ==
Non-profit organization positions
Preceded by Amien Rais	Leader of Muhammadiyah; 1998–2005	Succeeded by Din Syamsuddin
