= Limited radiology technician =

A limited radiology technician perform x-rays of patients and deliver the images to requester. They make no diagnosis but still work closely with patients, explaining procedures, operating the X-ray and other associated equipment. Technical aspects include positioning patients for X-rays, determining appropriate angle and height of X-ray equipment, and calculating radiation dosages needed to create X-rays of the appropriate density, detail, and contrast, enabling the physician to make an accurate diagnosis.

== Sources ==
- Justin Paskett, Healthcare Education Consultant at the Center for Excellence in Higher Education.
