= CCSD =

The initials CCSD may represent:

- Calgary Catholic School District, Alberta, Canada
- California College San Diego
- Camden City School District, New Jersey
- Central Columbia School District, Pennsylvania
- Chappaqua Central School District, New York
- Charleston County School District, South Carolina
- Cherry Creek School District, Colorado
- Clark County School District, Nevada
- Clarkstown Central School District, New York
- Coahoma County School District, Mississippi
- Cobb County School District, Georgia
- College Community School District, Iowa
- Crook County School District, Oregon
- Coupled Cluster Singles and Doubles, a method in coupled cluster theory
- Centre pour la communication scientifique directe, a French research organization in charge of open access repositories for academic publishing
