= Zubair Dahlan =

Kyai Hajji Zubair Dahlan
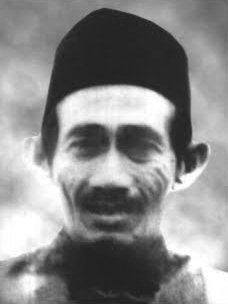
- Zubair Dahlan c. 1960s

Personal life
- Born: Anwar; 1905 Sarang, Rembang Regency, Central Java, Indonesia
- Died: November 25, 1969 (aged 63–64) Sarang, Rembang Regency, Central Java, Indonesia
- Cause of death: Fever
- Resting place: Makam KH. Zubair Dahlan, Karangmangu, Sarang, Rembang Regency
- Spouse: Mahmudah Ahmad (m. 1929; died 1939); Aisyah Abdul Hadi
- Children: With Mahmudah: Maimun Zubair; With Aisyah: Ma'ruf Zubair; And 5 others
- Parents: Dahlan Warijo (father); Hasanah Syuaib (mother)
- Main interests: Fiqh; uṣūl al-fiqh; tafsir; tasawwuf
- Occupation: Faqīh

Religious life
- Religion: Islam
- Denomination: Sunni
- Jurisprudence: Shafi‘i
- Creed: Ashʿari

Kyai Hajji Zubair Dahlan (born Anwar, Jawi: زبير دحلان; 1905 – November 25, 1969) was an Indonesian ulama of tafsir, fiqh, uṣūl al-fiqh, and tasawwuf from Rembang Regency, Central Java. Every year, in the month of Ramadan, Zubair always routinely teaches the Tafsir al-Jalalayn to his students. In addition, he also active in teaching branches of Arabic grammar and tawhid at the Pesantren Sarang. Zubair is the father of an influential cleric in Indonesia, Maimun Zubair, and a teacher of several Nahdlatul Ulama cleric such as Sahal Mahfudz, Bisri Syansuri, and others. Some of his students later became caregivers and leaders of famous pesantren in Indonesia, such as Pondok Pesantren Lirboyo, Pondok Pesantren Sidogiri, Pondok Pesantren Al-Falah Ploso, Pondok Pesantren Mranggen, and other pesantren.
