= California College (disambiguation) =

California College is the former name of Berkeley School of Theology in Berkeley, California.

California College may also refer to:

- California College of the Arts (San Francisco)
- California College of ASU (Los Angeles)
- California College of Music (Pasadena)
- California College San Diego
- College of California (Oakland)
- New College of California (San Francisco)

== See also ==
- List of colleges and universities in California
- University of California
- California University of Pennsylvania
- California College for Health and Sciences, Salt Lake City, Utah
- California College Republicans
