= Utah College of Dental Hygiene =

- Type: Private for-profit dental hygiene college
- Established: 2005
- Director: Laura I. M. Green
- Location: Orem, Utah; 40°16′32″N 111°43′52″W
- Website: www.ucdh.edu

The Utah College of Dental Hygiene (UCDH) is a private for-profit dental hygiene college in Orem, Utah, United States. The school is accredited by the Accrediting Commission of Career Schools and Colleges (ACCSC). The dental hygiene program at UCDH was established in 2005 and was the first private dental hygiene program established in the state of Utah. UCDH offers one specialized accelerated program: the 20 month Bachelor of Science Degree in Dental Hygiene (BSDH).
