= CollegeAmerica =

Non-profit college system

- Type: Private for-profit college
- Active: 1964–2021
- Parent institution: Center for Excellence in Higher Education
- President: Eric Juhlin
- Location: Arizona and Colorado, United States
- Campus: Main Campus, Denver, Colorado
- Colors: Red, white, and blue
- Website: www.collegeamerica.edu

CollegeAmerica was a private for-profit college with its main campus in Denver, Colorado. The college was one of four educational institutions affiliated with the Salt Lake City-based Center for Excellence in Higher Education (CEHE). It was founded as the training division of Control Data Corporation. Although it was previously accredited by the Accrediting Commission of Career Schools and Colleges, all institutions owned by CEHE were placed on probation in September 2018 because "the inputs, resources, and processes of CEHE schools are designed and implemented in a manner that is not designed for student success." After losing accreditation at one of its campuses in April 2021, the company froze new enrollment at all of its campuses before closing them all by the end of 2021.

== History ==
=== Non-profit status ===
In 2012, the college announced its intent to transfer to non-profit status for Title IV financial aid purposes (not to be confused with their non-profit Internal Revenue Service status) through its affiliation with the CEHE. However, a whistleblower suit was filed in Idaho against the CEHE collective of schools by two former recruiters alleging they were paid "bonuses, commissions, and other forms of incentive compensation in violation of the federal ban on such compensation." In May 2014 the U.S. Department of Justice joined the suit, stating that from its point-of-view the CEHE "directly or indirectly encouraged its recruiters to enroll anyone who was willing to apply for federal funds regardless of the students’ likelihood of success or ability to benefit" from the associated schools' educational programs. The Colorado Attorney General filed a similar lawsuit in December 2014, though it alleged "staff consistently misled and lied to students about the selectivity of the school, the transferability of credits, the jobs they could obtain, the salaries they could earn, and more," though CEHE denied the allegations as "full of distortions [and] half-truths."

On August 11, 2016, the U.S. Department of Education rejected the college chain's attempt to make its schools non-profit for Title IV financial aid purposes, leaving the schools for-profit for Title IV. In the Department of Education's statement, they said "non-profit institutions must be owned and operated by a non-profit where no part of the net earnings benefit any private shareholder or individual," and it had found, in its review, this was not the case. The CEHE filed suit against the Department of Education on August 30, calling its decision "arbitrary and capricious and inconsistent with the treatment of similarly situated nonprofit schools."

== Campus locations ==
Main and branch campuses offered a wide variety of programs and courses. CollegeAmerica had six campus locations:

- Colorado Springs, Colorado (206 students)
- Denver, Colorado (139 students)
- Fort Collins, Colorado (126 students)
- Stevens-Henager Idaho Falls, Idaho (111 students)
- Flagstaff, Arizona (78 students)
- Phoenix, Arizona (512 students)

The campus in Cheyenne, Wyoming, was closed on March 17, 2017, due to steadily declining enrollment.

All campuses were closed by the end of 2021 as a result of CollegeAmerica's loss of accreditation.

== Academics ==
CollegeAmerica offered associate, bachelor's, and master's degrees in a variety of programs, including healthcare, business, information technology, and graphic arts. The college offered a total of 41 degree programs: 9 associate degrees, 25 bachelor's degrees, and 7 master's degrees. The college offered a total of 15 healthcare degrees, 13 business degrees, 9 information technology degrees, and 4 graphic arts degrees.
