= Ilyas Ruhiat =

Indonesian Islamic scholar (1934–2007)

KH. Muhammad Ilyas Ruhiat
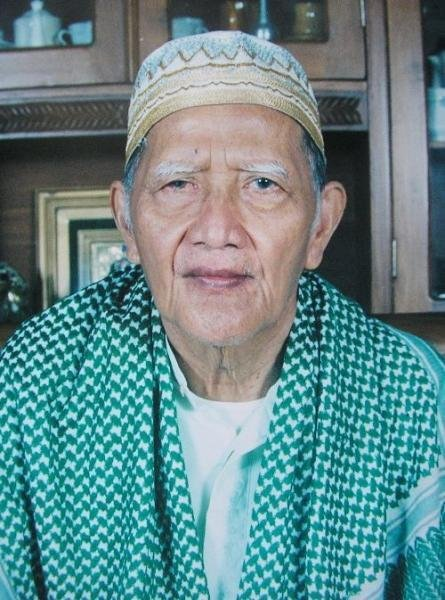
- Ruhiat in 2009
- Born: Muhammad Ilyas Ruhiat bin H. Ruhiat; January 31, 1934; Tasikmalaya, Dutch East Indies
- Died: December 18, 2007 (aged 73); Tasikmalaya, West Java, Indonesia
- Other name: Ajengan Ilyas
- Occupation: Ulama
- Known for: Supreme Council of Nahdlatul Ulama (1992-1999); Leader of Cipasung Boarding School
- Spouse: Hj. Dedeh Tsamrotul Fuadah
- Children: H. Acep Zamzam Noor, M.S. Dra. Hj. Neng Ida Nurhalida, M.Pd. Dra. Hj. Enung Nursaidah Rahayu, M.Pd.

Muhammad Ilyas Ruhiat (January 31, 1934 - December 18, 2007) better known as Ajengan Ilyas was an Indonesian Ulama and the leader of Cipasung Islamic Boarding School and also a Leader of Supreme Council (Ra'is 'Aam) Nahdlatul Ulama from 1992 until 1999. He was born at Tasikmalaya,

== Family ==
Muhammad Ilyas Ruhiat was born in a village called Cipasung, Singaparna, Tasikmalaya. His father, K.H. Ruhiat was a National Hero of Indonesia and was also the founder of Cipasung Islamic Boarding School. His mother, Hj. Aisyah was the first wife of KH. Ruhiat.

Ilyas married Dedeh Tsamrotul Fuadah and had three children. The first, Acep Zamzam Noor, became a poet who graduated from the Bandung Institute of Technology; the second, Neng Ida Nurhalida, became a chemistry teacher who graduated from the Indonesia University of Education; the last, Enung Nursaidah Rahayu, was a biology teacher who graduated from the Indonesia University of Education.

== Education ==
Ilyas completed three years in Vervolg (elementary school).

He continued his studies at Islamic boarding schools and took lessons in Arabic and English language, including Cipasung Islamic Boarding School that was built by his father.

== Career ==
He was selected as branch leader of executive council of Nahdlatul Ulama in Tasikmalaya in 1954.

He was selected as vice region leader of supreme council of Nahdlatul Ulama in West Java 1985 until 1989.

In Muktamar Nadhlatul Ulama at Lampung 1992 he was appointed general leader of Supreme Council of Nahdlatul Ulama, replacing Ahmad Shiddiq. He held that position until 1999.

After his father died on November 28, 1977, he took over his father's leadership of Cipasung Islamic Boarding School.

== Death ==
Ilyas died at Hasan Sadikin Hospital December 18, 2007 from a stroke and diabetes, and he was buried at Cipasung Islamic Boarding School Cemetery.

Non-profit organization positions
Preceded by Ali Yafie	Chief Adviser of NU; 1992-1999	Succeeded by Sahal Mahfudz
