= Stevens–Henager College =

Private College in Ogden, Utah (1891–2021)

Coordinates: 41°13′58″N 112°00′41″W

- Motto: Educating professionals since 1891
- Type: Private college
- Active: September 1891; 134 years ago –August 2021; 5 years ago
- Parent institution: Center for Excellence in Higher Education
- Location: Ogden, Utah, United States
- Colors: Grey and electric blue
- Website: www.stevenshenager.edu

Stevens–Henager College was a private college in Ogden, Utah, United States. It was founded in 1891 and closed abruptly in August 2021.

== History ==
Stevens–Henager was opened in September 1891 by Professor James Ayers Smith, an educator from Nebraska, as the Inter-Mountain Business College, with an enrollment of seven pupils. It began teaching commercial subjects and placed graduates in business positions. Paul Kenneth Smith, son of James Ayers Smith, began as the typewriter machinist and later served as an instructor at the college.

For about 19 years, Stevens–Henager College was known as Intermountain Business College. A Biennial Catalogue for 1908–09 shows the school's name as The Smithsonian Business College and Shorthand School, 258 Twenty Fourth Street, Ogden, Utah.

In 1910, J. A. Smith retired and sold the school to C. S. Springer, who changed the name to the Smithsonian Business School. In 1938, the college was purchased by David B. Moench, son of Louis F. Moench, a Utah educator and the first principal of Weber Stake Academy, which later became Weber State College. It then became known as the Moench University of Business and operated as such until 1940, when it was purchased by I. W. Stevens and renamed Ogden Business College. The name was changed to Stevens–Henager College in 1959.

The Stevens-Henager main campus was in Ogden, Utah. In 1969, the college established a campus in Salt Lake City (at approx. 7th South and 3rd East, moving elsewhere in Salt Lake years later). In 1978, the college established a campus in Provo. Other campuses followed, including Logan Campus in Utah in 2001, and Boise Campus in 2004 in Idaho.

The reason for the college's 2021 closure was not made public, but it was noted several months earlier that the school was placed on a probationary status by the United States Department of Education.

=== Non-profit status ===
In 2012, the college announced its intent to transfer to non-profit status for Title IV financial aid purposes (not to be confused with their non-profit Internal Revenue Service status) through its affiliation with the CEHE.

== Campuses ==
Stevens–Henager College had an online college (Independence University) and six campuses across Utah and Idaho. Campuses were in:

- Independence University Salt Lake City, Utah (8,605 online students)
- Murray, Utah (651 students)
- Logan, Utah (72 students; closing on September 13, 2020)
- Idaho Falls, Idaho (111 students; closing on September 13, 2020)
- Boise, Idaho (259 students)
- St. George, Utah (111 students; closing on September 13, 2020)

== Accreditation ==
Stevens-Henager was an accredited member of Accrediting Commission of Career Schools and Colleges (ACCSC). College degree programs are accredited by national accrediting bodies recognized by the U.S. Department of Education providing accreditation to non-university postsecondary colleges. Stevens-Henager's Medical Specialties Program is accredited by the Commission on Accreditation of Allied Health Education Programs (CAAHEP) upon Curriculum Review Board of the American Association of Medical Assistants Endowment (CRB-AAMAE) recommendation. Accreditation Review Committee on Education in Surgical Technology (ARC-ST) and Committee on Accreditation for Respiratory Care (CoARC) have recommended the accreditation of Surgical Technology Program and Respiratory Therapy Program, currently offered by the college.

Stevens–Henager College and all other institutions owned by the Center for Excellence in Higher Education were placed on probation by the Accrediting Commission of Career Schools and Colleges in September 2018 because "the inputs, resources, and processes of CEHE schools are designed and implemented in a manner that is not designed for student success."
