= Ali Maksum =

Islamic scholars in Indonesia

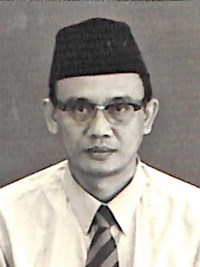

Chief Adviser of Nahdlatul Ulama
- In office 1980–1984
- Preceded by: Bisri Syansuri
- Succeeded by: Achmad Muhammad Hasan Siddiq

Personal details
- Born: March 2, 1915 Lasem, Rembang Regency, Indonesia
- Died: December 7, 1989 (aged 74) Yogyakarta
- Citizenship: Indonesian

Kiai Haji Ali Ma'shum (March 2, 1915 - December 7, 1989) was the chairman of the advisory council of Nahdlatul Ulama, the world's largest Islamic organization in Indonesia, from 1980 to 1984.
