= Ali Yafie =

Indonesian Islamic religious leader (1926–2023)

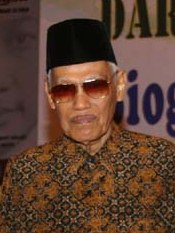
- Yafie in 2009 in Jakarta

Chairman of Indonesian Ulema Council
- In office 1990–2000
- Preceded by: Hasan Basri
- Succeeded by: Sahal Mahfudh

Chief Adviser of Nahdlatul Ulama
- In office 1991–1992
- Preceded by: Ahmad Shiddiq
- Succeeded by: Ilyas Ruhiat

Personal details
- Born: 1 September 1926 Donggala Regency, Central Sulawesi, Dutch East Indies
- Died: 25 February 2023 (aged 96)
- Citizenship: Indonesian

Kiai Hajji Ali Yafie (1 September 1926 – 25 February 2023) was an Indonesian faqih who was chairman of the Indonesian Ulema Council. He was a prominent figure of Nahdlatul Ulama (NU), the largest Islamic organization in the world based in Indonesia, and served as a temporary chief adviser from 1991 to 1992. He was active as a principal of Pondok Pesantren Darul Dakwah Al Irsyad in Parepare, South Sulawesi, which he founded in 1947, and as a member of the advisory board for the Indonesian Association of Muslim Intellectuals (ICMI).

== Biography ==
Yafie received his first education at a public elementary school, and continued the higher education at As'adiyah Madrasah in Sengkang, South Sulawesi. His major was Usul al-fiqh and he is widely known in Indonesia as an expert in this field. He devoted himself as a jurist in the religious courts of Ujung Pandang from 1959 to 1962, then at the inspectorate of the East Indonesian Religious Court from 1962 to 1965.

From 1965 to 1971, he became the dean of the faculty in the Ushuluddin State Institutes of Islamic Studies based in Ujung Pandang, and was active in NU at the provincial level. He became active in NU nationally from 1971. At the 1971 NU conference in Surabaya he was elected as an executive, and he was appointed to the House of Representatives after the election. Then he remained as a member of the House until 1987, when Djaelani Naro no longer put him in the list of candidates.

Since then, Yafie taught at various Islamic higher educational institutions in Jakarta, and became increasingly active in MUI. At the same time, he was re-elected as an executive at the 1979 NU conference in Semarang and 1984 conference in Situbondo, and in the 1989 conference in Krapyak as the representative of the chairman. Because Ahmad Siddiq, the incumbent chairman of the advisory board, died in 1991, he acted as the deputy chairman of the advisory board temporarily until 1992. After having disputes with Abdurrahman Wahid regarding the issues of aid from the Foundation for Social Welfare Fund, Yafie withdrew from NU chairmanship in 1992, making him, so far, only Chairman of NU that did it.

Despite his resignation, he was still a NU affiliated ulama and not leaving NU. Two years after his resignation as chairman of NU, in 1994, he attended NU General Meeting at Cipasung, Tasikmalaya. His relationship with Abdurrahman Wahid was still maintained until Wahid's death. In many occasions after Yafie's resignation, Wahid's occasionally blamed media for their contribution to inflame and irritate both Wahid and Yafie for making bad publicities. As in 2021, he was still active physically and still became Fiqh expert of both NU and Darul Dakwah wal Irsyad (DDI).

Yafie died on 25 February 2023, at the age of 96.

Non-profit organization positions
Preceded by Hasan Basri	Chairman of the Indonesian Ulema Council; 1990–2000	Succeeded by Sahal Mahfudh
Preceded by Ahmad Shiddiq	General Leader of Nahdlatul Ulama; 1991–1992	Succeeded by Ilyas Ruhiat
