= California College San Diego =

Private college

California College San Diego (CCSD)
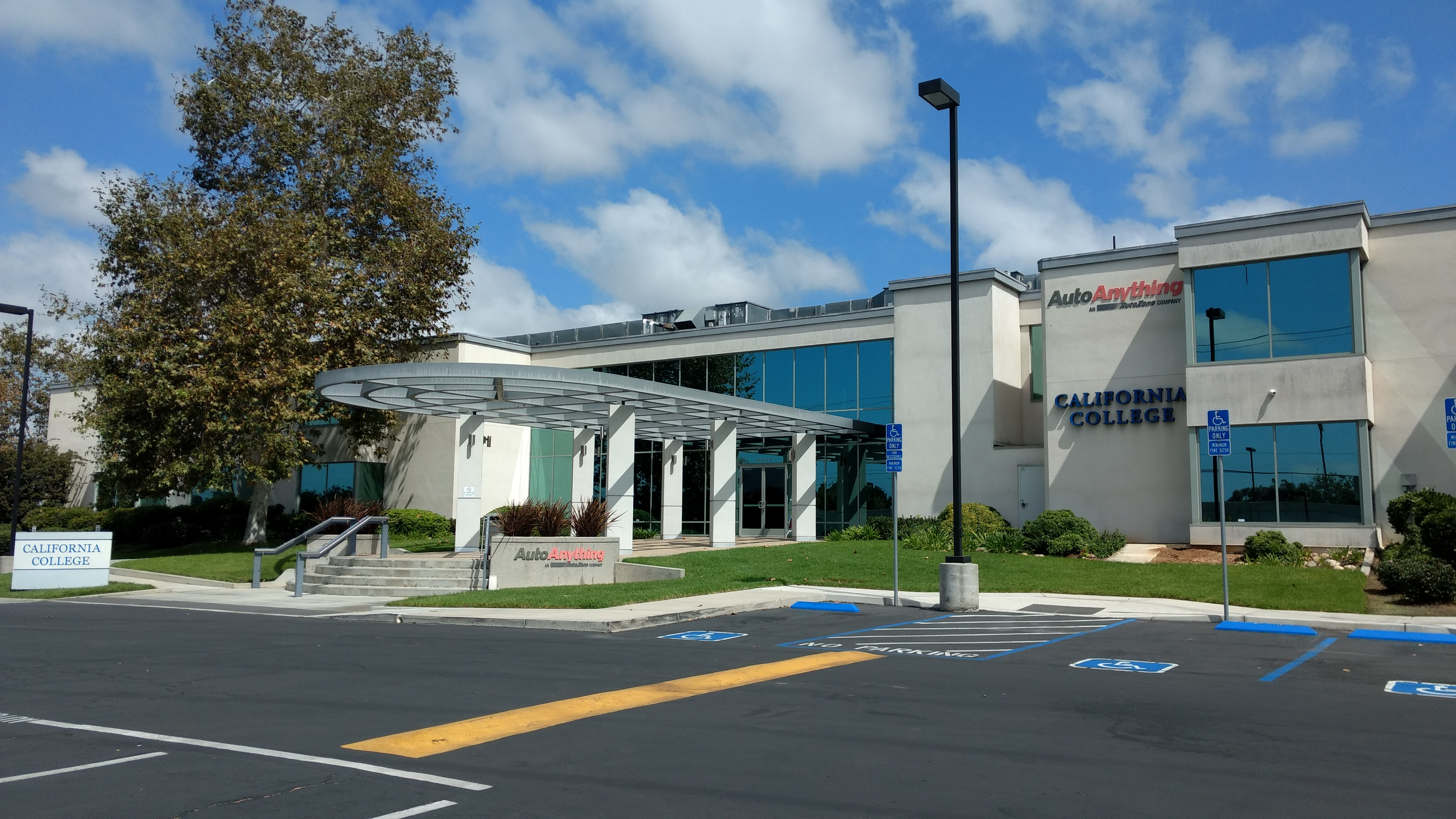
- West exterior of the college
- Type: Private college
- Established: 1978
- Parent institution: Center for Excellence in Higher Education
- President: Eric Juhlin
- Students: 1,299
- Location: San Diego, California, United States
- Colors: Navy Blue, White and Maroon
- Mascot: Bulldogs
- Website: www.cc-sd.edu

California College San Diego (CCSD) was a private college in San Diego, California. The college was one of four educational institutions affiliated with the Salt Lake City–based Center for Excellence in Higher Education (CEHE). It awarded associate, bachelor's, and master's programs in healthcare, business, and technology. The college was accredited by Accrediting Commission of Career Schools and Colleges (ACCSC) and was affiliated with Stevens-Henager College for providing online education.

== History ==
Prior to moving to California, the college was known as California College of Health Sciences (CCHS) and before that as California College for Respiratory Therapy (CCRT).

CCRT, earlier known as Scottsdale Education Center, originated in December 1971 and was located in Phoenix, Arizona. As a vocational-technical school, the college offered multiple allied health and technical programs. A Respiratory Therapy Technician Program was initiated by the college in January 1974 and was continued until 1976, in Phoenix. Scottsdale Education Center became California College for Respiratory Therapy (CCRT) after moving to California, where it operated in San Diego from 1977 to 1980. The college then offered only a Respiratory Therapy Technician program. A distance education model of the Respiratory Therapy Program was launched by CCRT in 1978. In 1983 CCRT renamed itself as California College of Health Sciences (CCHS).

In June 1996, the college was acquired by National Education Company (NEC)/International Correspondence Schools (ICS). Harcourt General acquired NEC, ICS's parent corporation and CCHS in June 1997. ICS (now Education Direct) and CCHS were then acquired by Thomson Corporation in 2001. In May 2003, the college was purchased by California College Inc. The institution then changed its name to California College San Diego (CCSD). The college became the newest member of the family of schools that includes Stevens-Henager College and CollegeAmerica. The academic offerings of the college were expanded to include degree programs in other educational fields like business, technology and medical specialties.

=== Non-profit status ===
In 2012, the college announced its intent to transfer to non-profit status for Title IV financial aid purposes (not to be confused with their non-profit Internal Revenue Service status) through its affiliation with the CEHE. However, a whistleblower suit was filed in Idaho against the CEHE collective of schools by two former recruiters alleging they were paid "bonuses, commissions, and other forms of incentive compensation in violation of the federal ban on such compensation." In May 2014 the U.S. Department of Justice joined the suit, stating that from its point-of-view the CEHE "directly or indirectly encouraged its recruiters to enroll anyone who was willing to apply for federal funds regardless of the students’ likelihood of success or ability to benefit" from the associated schools' educational programs. The Colorado Attorney General filed a similar lawsuit in December 2014, though it alleged "staff consistently misled and lied to students about the selectivity of the school, the transferability of credits, the jobs they could obtain, the salaries they could earn, and more," though CEHE denied the allegations as "full of distortions [and] half-truths."

On August 11, 2016, the U.S. Department of Education rejected the college chain's attempt to make its schools non-profit for Title IV financial aid purposes, leaving the schools for-profit for Title IV. In the Department of Education's statement, they said "non-profit institutions must be owned and operated by a non-profit where no part of the net earnings benefit any private shareholder or individual," and it had found, in its review, this was not the case. The CEHE filed suit against the Department of Education on August 30, calling its decision "arbitrary and capricious and inconsistent with the treatment of similarly situated nonprofit schools."

== Accreditation ==
The college was accredited by the Accrediting Commission of Career Schools and Colleges (ACCSC). Selected degree programs, for example, the Respiratory Therapy Program, are also accredited by other accreditation agencies.

== Former Campus locations ==
California College San Diego had two locations, one at 6602 Convoy Court in San Diego and the other at 277 Rancheros Drive Suite 200 in San Marcos.

== School Closure ==
On July 29, 2021, officials representing the Center for Excellence in Higher Education (CEHE) —owners of California College San Diego, CollegeAmerica Phoenix, Independence University, and Stevens-Henager College—informed the U.S. Department of Education (ED) that the institutions would close on Aug. 1, 2021.
