= Miftachul Achyar =

Indonesian ulama (born 1953)

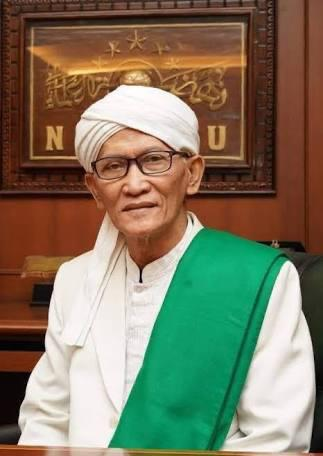
- Achyar in 2020

Supreme Leader of the Nahdlatul Ulama
- Incumbent
- Assumed office 22 September 2018
- Preceded by: Ma'ruf Amin

Chairman of the Indonesian Ulama Council
- In office 26 November 2020 – 14 August 2023
- Preceded by: Ma'ruf Amin
- Succeeded by: Anwar Iskandar

Personal details
- Born: 1953 (age 72–73) East Java, Indonesia
- Spouse: Nyai Chakimah
- Children: 5
- Occupation: Islamic scholar

Miftachul Achyar (born 1953) is an Indonesian Islamic scholar. He is the Rais 'Aam (supreme leader) of the Nahdlatul Ulama since 2018.

== Biography ==
Achyar was born in 1953 in East Java, Indonesia, as the ninth of the thirteen children of Abdul Ghoni. His father was a caretaker of the Akhlaq Rangkah Islamic Boarding School in Surabaya. Achyar was raised in a religious environment, and completed his education at several boarding schools such as: Tambak Beras Jombang Boarding School, Sidogiri Pasuruan Boarding School, and Lasem Boarding School. He also attended the religious assembly of Sayyid Muhammad bin Alawi al-Makki al-Maliki in Malang.

Achyar was appointed as Leader Syuriyah of PCNU Surabaya from 2000 until 2005, followed by Leader Syuriyah of PWNU East Java from 2007 until 2013, and was appointed again from 2013 until 2018. He was appointed as Vice Leader of Aam PBNU from 2018 until 2020, replacing Ma'ruf Amin who went for presidential campaign. He later was appointed as the leader of Indonesian Ulama Council, and was appointed as the leader of AAM PBNU from 2021 until 2026.

== 2021 car accident ==
On 12 August 2021, Achyar was injured in a car accident at Semarang–Solo Toll Road where his car crashed into the back of a truck. He was rushed to RSUD Salatiga where he was treated for his minor injury, along with another passenger. He was later discharged.
