= Mustofa Bisri =

Indonesian Muslim cleric

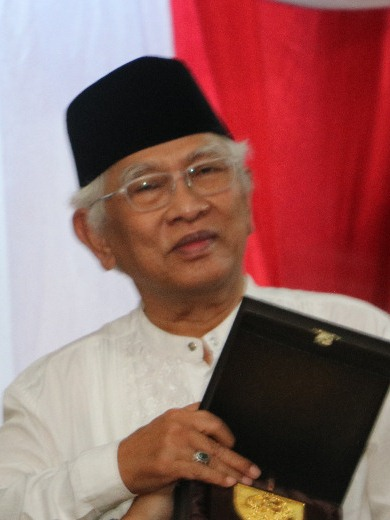
Mustofa Bisri

Ahmad Mustofa Bisri (born 10 August 1944) is an Indonesian Islamic leader and was the ninth Chief Adviser of Nahdlatul Ulama. He is the head of Pondok Pesantren Raudlatuth Thalibin, Rembang, Central Java, Indonesia. Mustofa Bisri, well known as Gus Mus, is famous not only as a kyai—traditional Islamic teacher & leader, but also as a poet and painter.

== Background ==
Gus Mus is the son of KH Bisri Musthofa and a grandson of H Zaenal Musthofa, both were respected Islamic leader in Indonesia. He studied in various pondok pesantren—traditional Islamic school, such as Pesantren Lirboyo Kediri under guidance of KH Marzuqi and KH Mahrus Ali; Al Munawwar Krapyak Yogyakarta under KH Ali Ma'shum and KH Abdul Qadir; and Al Azhar University of Cairo.

Gus Mus is married to Siti Fatmah and they have 7 (seven) children : Ienas Tsuroiya, Kautsar Uzmut, Raudloh Quds, Rabiatul Bisriyah, Nada, Almas and Muhammad Bisri Mustofa. From his children marriages, he has 5 (five) sons in law : Ulil Abshar Abdalla, Reza Shalahuddin Habibi, Ahmad Sampton, Wahyu Salvana, and Fadel Irawan, with 8 (eight) grandsons: Ektada Bennabi Mohamad; Ektada Bilhadi Mohamad; Muhammad Ravi Hamadah Habibi, Muhammad Raqie Haidarah Habibi; Muhammad Najie Ukasyah, Ahmad Naqie Usamah, Samih Wahyu Maulana and Muhammad Rasikh Rujhan.

== Gus Mus & Nahdlatul Ulama ==
In 1970, upon returning from Egypt, he was appointed as board member of Nahdlatul Ulama (NU) Rembang. Then in 1977 he was elected as a Mustasyar, Counselor Board member of NU Central Java. On the NU Muktamar (general meeting) in Cipanas, West Java, in 1994 he was elected as Rais Syuriah PB NU.

On the 31st Muktamar NU in 2004 in Boyolali Central Java he was asked by several kyai, including the former Indonesian President Gus Dur to become one of the contestants for NU Chairman. But he refused the offer, which led to the winning of KH Hasyim Muzadi for the second time.

== Gus Mus' Writings ==
Below are Gus Mus' published books:

- Ensiklopedi Ijmak (Terjemahan bersama KHM Ahmad Sahal Mahfudz, Pustaka Firdaus, Jakarta);
- Proses Kebahagiaan (Sarana Sukses, Surabaya);
- Awas Manusia dan Nyamuk Yang Perkasa (Gubahan Cerita anak-anak, Gaya Favorit Press, Jakarta);
- Maha Kiai Hasyim Asy’ari (Terjemahan, Kurnia Kalam Semesta, Jogjakarta);
- Syair Asmaul Husna (Bahasa Jawa, Cet. I Al-Huda, Temanggung; Cet. II 2007, MataAir Publishing);
- Saleh Ritual Saleh Sosial, Esai-esai Moral (Mizan, Bandung);
- Pesan Islam Sehari-hari, Ritus Dzikir dan Gempita Ummat (Cet. II 1999, Risalah Gusti, Surabaya);
- Al-Muna, Terjemahan Syair Asma’ul Husna (Al-Miftah, / MataAir Publishing Surabaya);
- Mutiara-mutiara Benjol (Cet. II 2004 MataAir Publishing, Surabaya);
- Fikih Keseharian Gus Mus (Cet. I Juni 1997 Yayasan Al-Ibriz bejerhasana dengan Penerbit Al-Miftah Surabaya; Cet. II April 2005, Cet. III Januari 2006, Khalista, Surabaya bekerjasama dengan Komunitas Mata Air);
- Canda nabi & Tawa Sufi (Cet. I Juli 2002, cet. II November 2002, Penerbit Hikmah, Bandung);
- Melihat Diri Sendiri (Gama Media, Jogjakarta)

Non-profit organization positions
Preceded by Sahal Mahfudh	General Leader of Nahdlatul Ulama; 2014–2015	Succeeded by Ma'ruf Amin
