= Center for Excellence in Higher Education =

Utah-based company

- Formation: 2007
- Founder: Carl Barney
- Headquarters: 3556 S 5600 W, Suite 1- 1126 Blvd, Suite 220
- Location: Salt Lake City, UT
- CEO: Eric Juhlin

The Center for Excellence in Higher Education (CEHE) is a Utah-based nonprofit, 501(c)(3) corporation that owned and managed Independence University, CollegeAmerica, Stevens-Henager College, and California College San Diego before their abrupt closings in August 2021. The company was a nonprofit organization. CEHE's colleges were accredited by the Accrediting Commission of Career Schools and Colleges (ACCSC). The colleges were placed on probation in September 2018 due to ACCSC's concerns that "the inputs, resources, and processes of CEHE schools are designed and implemented in a manner that is not designed for student success." CEHE was also the lender to National American University.

== History ==
The Center for Excellence in Higher Education (CEHE) was founded by a group of academics and businessmen in 2007. In 2020, CEHE was fined $3 million by the State of Colorado for violation of the Colorado Consumer Protection Act. In August 2021, this decision was reversed, in part, and the State of Colorado refunded the $3 million to CEHE in November 2021. By early August 2021 all CEHE campuses were closed. In 2022, CEHE filed a lawsuit against the U.S. Department of Education, in which CEHE is pursuing three claims with damages in excess of $100 million.

== Philosophy ==
The Center for Excellence in Higher Education supported free-market ideas in higher education. Its stated purpose was "to educate the public about the state of higher education in America and help donors promote excellence in higher education through philanthropy". CEHE had as an area of particular focus of ensuring that gifts to universities and colleges were used in accordance with the intent of the donors. It also supported efforts directed at the structural reform of higher education. It received its initial funding from the Marcus Foundation, the John Templeton Foundation, and the John William Pope Foundation.
