= Harun Kamil =

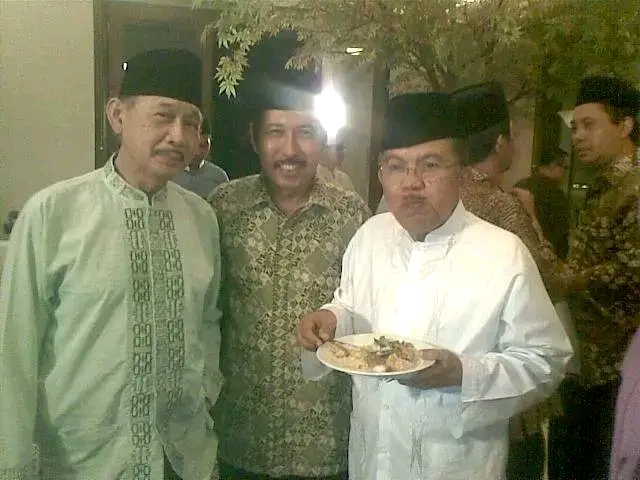
Harun Kamil (furthest to the left) and Jusuf Kalla (furthest to the right)

Harun Kamil, SH., is a lawyer, law expert, notary and politician Indonesia. He believed the Constitution served as Chairman of the Forum, which was founded by several prominent members of the legal and political scene in Indonesia. Declaration of the forum in July 2005 and was attended by former Assembly Speaker Amien Rais and Hidayat Nur Wahid, former chairman of the Constitutional Court Jimly Asshiddiqie, and legal practitioners Todung Mulya Lubis. Previously, Aaron Kamin was a member of the People's Consultative Assembly group representatives.

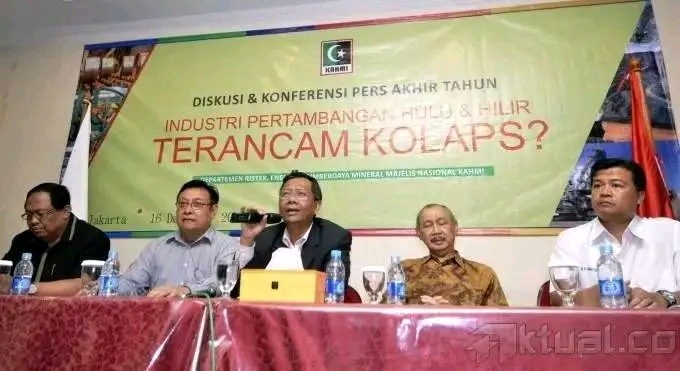
Harun Kamil on the left Mahfud MD

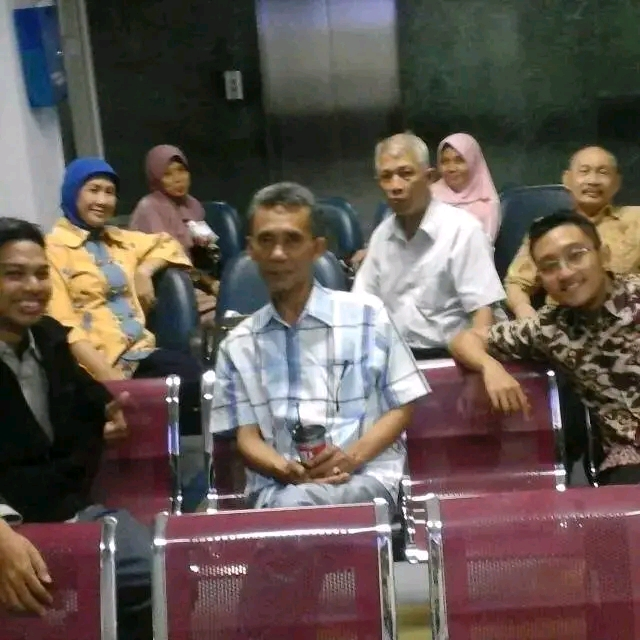
Harun Kamil (Sitting in the second row, furthest to the right, wearing brown batik)
