= Dehlan =

Dehlan دهلان
- Village
- Location within Iran
- Coordinates: 37°31′42″N 47°01′19″E
- Country: Iran
- Province: East Azerbaijan
- County: Hashtrud
- Bakhsh: Central
- Rural District: Kuhsar

Population (2006)
  - Total: 131
- Time zone: UTC+3:30 (IRST)
  - Summer (DST): UTC+4:30 (IRDT)

Dehlan (Persian: دهلان, also Romanized as Dehlān and Dahlān) is a village in Kuhsar Rural District, in the Central District of Hashtrud County, East Azerbaijan Province, Iran. At the 2006 census, its population was 131, in 28 families.
