= California University of Management and Sciences =

Private university in Anaheim, California

- Motto: Values, Versatility, Technology
- Type: Private university
- Established: 1998
- Accreditation: WSCUC
- Location: Anaheim, California, and Fairfax, Virginia, United States
- Website: www.calums.edu

California University of Management and Sciences (CALUMS) is a private university in Anaheim, California, United States. CALUMS was founded by David Park in 1998. CALUMS opened its Virginia Campus in Arlington, Virginia, in 2008. The university offers graduate degrees in business administration, computer information systems, economics, healthcare management, and international business, and an undergraduate degree in business management.

CALUMS is accredited by the WASC Senior College and University Commission. It is also licensed to operate by the California Bureau for Private Postsecondary Education (BPPE).

== Campus ==
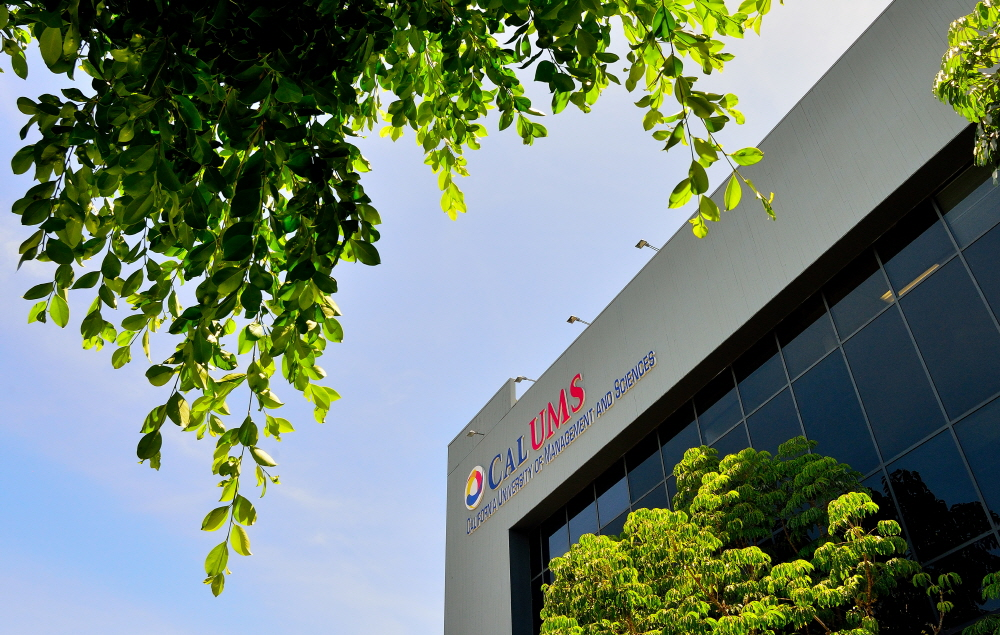
CalUMS Anaheim Campus

California University of Management and Sciences has two campuses. The university's main campus is the Anaheim Campus, located in Anaheim, California, and established in 1998. In 2008, the university established its second campus, the Virginia Campus in Fairfax, Virginia.
