= Independence University =

Coordinates: 41°13′58″N 112°00′41″W

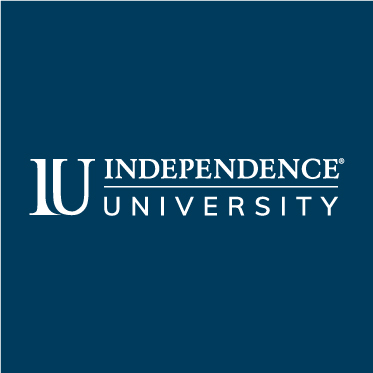
- Motto: Online but never alone.
- Type: Private online career college
- Active: 1978; 48 years ago – August 1, 2021; 5 years ago
- Parent institution: Center for Excellence in Higher Education
- Affiliations: CollegeAmerica, Stevens-Henager College, California College San Diego
- President: Eric Juhlin
- Provost: Marilee Hall
- Location: Salt Lake City, Utah, United States
- Campus: Online
- Colors: Red, white, and blue
- Nickname: IU
- Website: www.independence.edu

Independence University (IU, formerly California College for Health Sciences) was a private online career college headquartered in Salt Lake City, Utah.

It was the online branch of Stevens–Henager College, and operated four schools: the School of Healthcare, the School of Business, the School of Technology, and the School of Graphic Arts. IU was founded by Carl Barney and owned and operated by the Center for Excellence in Higher Education (CEHE). IU was accredited by the Accrediting Commission of Career Schools and Colleges. But in early 2021 the accreditor began withdrawing its approval for IU because the university allegedly "failed to demonstrate successful student achievement by maintaining acceptable rates of student graduation and employment." In 2021, IU canceled classes scheduled to start May 10, and the school closed permanently effective August 1, 2021.

== History ==
In 1978, the school began to offer education at a distance and operated as California College for Health Sciences. In 2005, it was renamed Independence University in order to reflect the institution's broader range of programs and its claimed philosophy that education should lead to greater independence. In 2010, Independence University merged with its affiliated institution, Stevens-Henager College, becoming a branch of Stevens-Henager's main campus in Ogden/West Haven, Utah. Stevens-Henager was started in 1891. In 2012, Carl Barney, its owner, turned the school into a non-profit.

=== Decline ===
In 2020, Carl Barney was fined $3 million by the State of Colorado for defrauding students at CEHE schools. Following the judgement, the U.S. Department of Education suspended CEHE President Eric Juhlin from "participating in contracts or other programs of the federal government." Shortly thereafter, IU's accreditor, the Accrediting Commission of Career Schools and Colleges, began the process of withdrawing the university accreditation. In July 2021, Independence University management announced that the school had been placed on Heightened Cash Monitoring and had not received any cash from the US Department of Education since May 2020. Management told workers that most of them would be laid off in the next few months.

== Academics ==
Independence University was an open enrollment institution. It offered programs in the fields of technology, business, graphic arts, and healthcare. Students attending the university may receive an associate's degree, a bachelor's degree, or a master's degree. The university did not function on a typical college schedule and did not have semesters or quarters. Instead, classes started each month and generally ran for 4 weeks. According to the US Department of Education College Navigator, Independence University has a 45 to 1 student to teacher ratio.

== Student body ==
According to the US Department of Education, 90 percent of IU's students were low-income individuals. The student body was 25 percent white, 14 percent black, 4 percent Hispanic, 0 percent Asian, and 45 percent unknown.

== Military assistance ==
More than 500 students were attending under the GI Bill. Independence University participated in the Yellow Ribbon Program, a provision of the Post-9/11 GI Bill that allowed approved institutions of higher learning and the Department of Veterans Affairs to partially or fully fund tuition and fee expenses that exceeded the established thresholds under the Post-9/11 GI Bill.

== Accreditation ==
Independence University was nationally accredited by the Accrediting Commission of Career Schools and Colleges (ACCSC). Independence University was placed on probation in September 2018 due to ACCSC's concerns that "the inputs, resources, and processes of CEHE schools are designed and implemented in a manner that is not designed for student success." In April 2021 the school faced revocation of its accreditation status effective May 31, 2021. CEHE appealed the revocation with ACCSC and then sought binding arbitration, losing both times. CEHE then sued in Federal court, which ruled against CEHE holding the suit was an impermissible collateral attack on the arbitration award.

== Student outcomes ==
According to the College Scorecard, Independence University had a 45 percent 8-year graduation rate. According to the College Navigator it had a graduation rate of 12 percent for students pursuing a bachelors degree. People who attended Independence University had a 20 percent student loan repayment rate, and a 31 percent graduation rate. Median salary after attending was $28,800, ranging from $18,298 (Design and Applied Arts AA) to $66,240 (Allied Health, BS). Typical debt after graduation was $27,139. For those in student loan repayment, 34 percent were in forbearance, 25 percent not making progress, 16 defaulted, 10 percent were delinquent, 8 percent were in deferment, 4 percent were making progress, 1 percent were discharged, and 1 percent were paid in full.
