= California University of Management and Technology =

Private education provider in California, US

Coordinates: 37.37166°N 122.00178°W

The California University of Management and Technology (CALMAT) is a private unaccredited tertiary education provider in Sunnyvale, California.

Programs and courses at CALMAT are designed to support both full-time and part-time students. An Advisory Board consisting of leaders in industry from Silicon Valley, including Charles Wang, Thomas Blood, Dennis Hungridge, Samuel Tong, Dennis Sahani, is closely involved in shaping the nature and content of the programs offered by CALMAT.

CALMAT currently offers an MBA program and a Master of Science program in Computer science and Information technology. It also offers several degree completion program options for a Bachelor of Business Administration that are designed to bridge 2-year or 3-year college coursework into a bachelor's degree and preparation for graduate studies.

== See also ==
- List of colleges and universities in California
