= Indonesian Ulama Council =

Islamic organisation based in Jakarta, Indonesia

Indonesian Ulema Council
- Majelis Ulama Indonesia مجلس العلماء الإندونيسي
- Formation: 26 July 1975; 51 years ago
- Type: Socio-religious organization
- Headquarters: Menteng, Central Jakarta, Jakarta
- Region served: Indonesia
- Leader: Anwar Iskandar
- Website: mui.or.id

Indonesian Ulema Council (Indonesian: Majelis Ulama Indonesia, Arabic: مجلس العلماء الإندونيسي, abbreviated MUI) is Indonesia's top Islamic scholars' body. MUI was founded in Jakarta on 26 July 1975 during the New Order era. The council comprises many Indonesian Muslim groups including Nahdlatul Ulama (NU), Muhammadiyah, Indonesia Institute of Islamic Dawah (LDII), and smaller groups such as Syarikat Islam, Perti, Al Washliyah, Mathla'ul Anwar, GUPPI, PTDI, DMI, and Al Ittihadiyyah.

The Ahlul Bait Indonesia (Shi'ite) and Jemaat Ahmadiyyah Indonesia (Ahmadiyya) were not accepted as members. In 2005, MUI released the fatwa to prohibit Ahmadiyya as deviant sect of Islam and lobbied the President to ban the expelled religious sect.

== Roles ==
The government, at the creation of the MUI stated three broad goals for the MUI:

1. Strengthening religion in the way the Pancasila describes to ensure national resilience.
2. Participation of the Ulama in national development.
3. The maintenance of harmony between the different religions in Indonesia.

Beside the three goals, nonetheless, there were two specific agendas of MUI's establishment. First, it aimed to help Suharto in communism repudiation. Second, it was an umbrella organization for political Islam canalization.

Since the collapse of Suharto's regime in 1998, MUI has changed its approach in the state-religion relationship by envisioning a more active role to protect Muslim's interests while started a new position as a critical partner of the Indonesian government. The MUI, thus, acts as an interface between the Indonesian government and the Islamic communities. The changes in civil society after the fall of Suharto have both widened the role of the MUI and made it more complex. The MUI gives fatwas to the Islamic community; through this they dictate the general direction of Islamic life in Indonesia. Fatwa (or plural form Fatawa) represents Muslim's ethical response, legal interpretation, and contextual feedback on a particular social issue(s).

The MUI now has twelve commissions and ten divisions that work together in behalf of Muslim's interest through various responsibilities such as fatwa, education and leadership training, women and family, law and regulation, research and development, inter-religious engagement, international relations, economic betterment and many more. Each commissions is led by professional and Islamic scholars.

The MUI (particularly since the fall of Suharto) have given opinion and issued fatwas on a large variety of issues, from the role of the Indonesian Army in government to the public acceptability of the dancing of pop star Inul Daratista to the (sin of) deliberately burning forests to clear the land for growing crops.

An important function of MUI is to provide halal fatwa for products (including but not limited to foods, cosmetics, pharmaceutical and clothing).

== List of chairmen ==
=== Representative ===
Nahdlatul Ulama
Muhammadiyah

No.	Portrait	Name	Took office	Left office	Term of office	Election
1		Abdul Malik Karim Amrullah	26 July 1975	19 May 1981 (Note: Hamka resigned from the office after the controversy of giving fatwa about Christmas appeared)	5 years, 297 days	National Conference I (1975)
2		Syukri Ghozali	24 July 1981	20 September 1984	3 years, 58 days	National Conference II (1981)
3		Hasan Basri	1984	1985	5–6 years	Fait Accompli
3		Hasan Basri	1985	1990	5–6 years	National Conference III (1985)
4		Ali Yafie	1990	1995	9–10 years	National Conference IV (1990)
4		Ali Yafie	1995	2000	9–10 years	National Conference V (1995)
5		Sahal Mahfudh	29 July 2000	28 July 2005	13 years, 179 days	National Conference VI (2000)
5		Sahal Mahfudh	28 July 2005	25 July 2010	13 years, 179 days	National Conference VII (2005)
5		Sahal Mahfudh	25 July 2010	24 January 2014 (Note: died in office)	13 years, 179 days	National Conference VIII (2010)
6		Din Syamsuddin	24 January 2014	27 August 2015	1 year, 215 days	Fait Accompli
7		Ma'ruf Amin	27 August 2015	20 October 2019 (Note: On 20 October 2019, Ma'ruf Amin was an inactive leader due to his inauguration as Vice President)	4 years, 54 days	National Conference IX (2015)
8		Miftachul Achyar	26 November 2020	14 August 2023	2 years, 270 days	National Conference X (2020)
9		Anwar Iskandar	15 August 2023	Incumbent	Incumbent	Plenary Session (2023)

== Conflicts ==
MUI is a government funded organisation that acts independently but there have been examples of the MUI being asked to legitimise government policy. A particular example of this that caused friction within the MUI was request that the MUI support the government's birth control program. The government needed the support of the MUI and aspects of the program were objected to by many in religious circles.

== See also ==
- Halal certification in Australia
