= Pancasila Ideology Development Agency =

Government agency of Indonesia

- Badan Pembinaan Ideologi Pancasila
- Seal of BPIP

Agency overview
- Formed: 19 May 2017 (as Presidential Unit of Pancasila Ideology Development); 28 February 2018 (as Pancasila Ideology Development Agency)
- Jurisdiction: Indonesia
- Agency executives: Megawati Sukarnoputri, Head of Steering Committee; Yudian Wahyudi, Head
- Website: https://bpip.go.id

The Pancasila Ideology Development Agency (Indonesian: Badan Pembinaan Ideologi Pancasila, BPIP) is a non-ministerial government agency formed by the Indonesian government in 2018 with Presidential Decree No.7/2018. The agency was tasked with the main task of preserving Pancasila, the state ideology, and its ideological development and implementation. It is the revitalisation of Presidential Unit of Pancasila Ideology Development formed in 2017.

BPIP is not related with the New Order's era Agency for Development, Education, Implementation of Guidelines for the Appreciation and Practice of Pancasila (Badan Pembinaan Pendidikan Pelaksanaan Pedoman Penghayatan dan Pengamalan Pancasila, BP-7).

== History ==
=== Sukarno era ===
As ideology unique to Indonesia, efforts to preserve, educate, and develop of Pancasila have been carried out since the 1950s. Pancasila has included in basic education system since 1950 through issuance of Law No. 4/1950. However, in 1959, attempts for Pancasila preservation started to become skewed in practice and used as political tool for gaining the support for ruling regime. During Sukarno administration, Pancasila preservation was hampered due to Sukarno 1959 political manifesto (originally his address during the 1959 Indonesian Independence Day parade), which introduced Manipol USDEK, short for manifesto politik UUD 1945, sosialisme Indonesia, demokrasi terpimpin, ekonomi terpimpin, kepribadian Indonesia, which translated as [Sukarno's] political manifesto, Constitution of 1945, Indonesian Socialism (a non-Russian variant of National Bolshevism), guided democracy, guided economy, and Indonesia nationalism. This manifesto resulted in Pancasila mixed together with leftist ideologies and being used as tool for perpetuation of Sukarno administration. After the Manipol USDEK ideology was enshrined thru Provisional People's Consultative Assembly Resolution No. I/MPRS/1960, the resolution required the population to follow Sukarno's interpretation of Pancasila according to him and rejected any alternative interpretation. As a tool for its development, the Supreme Advisory Council (Indonesian: Dewan Pertimbangan Agung, DPA) was used to socialize and promote Manipol USDEK as the defacto national principle. Moreover, government established Revolutionary Soul Committee (Indonesian: Panitia Pembina Djiwa Revolusi, PPJR, Pabinjir) for Manipol USDEK dissemination which used Seven Basic Materials for Indoctrination (Indonesian: Tujuh Bahan Pokok Indoktrinasi, Tubapi), Panca Wardhana which emphasized the importance of Pancasila and Manipol in basic education, and higher education subjects such as History of the National Movement (Indonesian: Sejarah Pergerakan Nasional), History of the People’s Movement of NEFOs (Indonesian: Sejarah Pergerakan Rakyat-Rakyat Nefos), and Political Economy, and Indonesian Socialism (Indonesian: Ekonomi Politik, dan Sosialisme Indonesia) by Coordinating Body of Pancasila and Manipol (Indonesian: Lembaga Pembina Jiwa Pancasila dan Manipol) and later transformed into Bureau of the Soul of the Indonesian Revolution (Indonesian: Biro Pembina Jiwa Revolusi Indonesia).

=== Suharto era ===
The need of Pancasila preservation become intensified after the 30 September Movement, after Suharto concluded that Pancasila was no longer practiced by Indonesian population, thus "Communism/Marxism-Leninism" (sic, official state terminology) was raised as contender and challenged the state ideology. By mandate of People's Consultative Assembly Resolution No. II/MPR/1978, Suharto formalized the creation of the Guidelines for the Appreciation and Practice of Pancasila (Indonesian: Pedoman Penghayatan dan Pengamalan Pancasila, P-4, or Ekaprasetia Pancakarsa) as a national policy. On 26 March 1979, thru Presidential Decree No. 10/1979, the Agency for Development, Education, Implementation of Guidelines for the Appreciation and Practice of Pancasila (Badan Pembinaan Pendidikan Pelaksanaan Pedoman Penghayatan dan Pengamalan Pancasila, BP-7) was founded by Suharto administration to further develop Pancasila as the official national ideology. BP-7's operational structure spanned from the central government to district levels. In 1985, Suharto further charged the BP-7 to implement the asas tunggal Pancasila (Sole Basis in Pancasila) policy, ensuring that all Indonesian organizations and society in general abides with the 5 points of Pancasila and lives the values and way of life related to it.

After the beginning of reformasi in 1998, BP-7 was formally abolished by President B. J. Habibie by issuance of Presidential Decree No. 27/1999 due to its connections to Suharto - and his interpretation of the ideology, Resolution 2/MPR/1978, deemed as too authoritarian and anti-democratic, as well as unadaptable to current circumstances, in addition to the former presidency's abuse of the ideology to fight against any and all forms of dissent and opposition. With no longer have agency dedicated to preserve it, Pancasila no longer protected and threatened. Excessive freedom brought by reformasi, together with abolition of Pancasila studies in post-New Order education system also enabled other foreign ideologies to be imported to Indonesia without filter, resulted in much mixture and loss uniformity in Pancasila teaching and enabled to various interpretation of Pancasila to be exist, further threatening Pancasila as ideology and also resulted in loss of national identity and threatening national resilience.

=== Reformation and new agency ===
In his 1999 address to the People's Consultative Assembly, President B. J. Habibie stated that the old BP-7 needed to be abolished because of its autocratic treatment of Pancasila and its links to the long era of the New Order, and thus stated that a replacement was necessary, not just for it, but for the 1978 interpretation of Pancasila in order to update it to the situations of modern Indonesian society, human rights and the newly restored democracy.

18 years after dissolution of BP-7, Joko Widodo, in a belated fulfillment of Habibie's promise, issued Presidential Decree No. 54/2017, establishing the Presidential Unit of Pancasila Ideology Development (Indonesia: Unit Kerja Presiden Pembinaan Ideologi Pancasila, UKP-PIP). UKP-PIP later elevated to BPIP by issuance of Presidential Decree No. 7/2018.

The current agency, as its basis, provides the duty of the development, practice and application of Pancasila per the provisions of Resolution 1/PCA/2003 on the Application of Pancasila by the People's Consultative Assembly - the current official state interpretation of the dogma of Pancasila, formulated to apply lessons learned from the reformasi era of pro-democracy movements of the 90s that led to the end of the New Order.

== Organizational structure ==
The structure of BPIP is largely based on Presidential Decree No. 7/2018. The structure is also expanded with Head of Pancasila Ideology Development Agency Decree No. 5/2021 and No. 4/2023.

1. Office of BPIP Steering Committee
  1. Steering Committees
  2. Council of Experts of the BPIP Steering Committee
  3. Special Staffs of the BPIP Steering Committee
  4. BPIP Steering Committee Special Task Forces (Ad-hoc units)
2. Executives
  1. Office of Chairperson of BPIP
  2. Office of Vice Chairperson of BPIP
  3. Main Secretariat
    1. Bureau of Planning and Finance
      - Division of Finance
        - Subdivision of Financial Governance and Organization Treasury
        - Subdivision of Accountancy and Financial Reporting
        - Subdivision of Bureau of Planning and Finance Administration
    2. Bureau of Law and Organization
      - Division of Legal Drafting
      - Division of Organization and Governance Affairs
        - Subdivision of Organization Affairs
        - Subdivision of Bureaucracy Governance and Reform
        - Subdivision of Bureau of Law and Organization Administration
    3. Bureau of General Affairs and Human Resources
      - Division of State Property Management, Procurement Services, and Household Affairs
        - Subdivision of State Property Management
        - Subdivision of Procurement Services
        - Subdivision of Household Affairs
      - Division of Human Resources Affairs
        - Subdivision of Human Resources Affairs
        - Subdivision of Planning and Management of Human Resource Performances
        - Subdivision of Employee Transfer and Human Resource Development
        - Subdivision of Bureau of General Affairs and Human Resources Administration
    4. Bureau of Leadership Facilitation, Public Relation, and Administration Affairs
      - Division of Leadership Facilitation
        - Subdivision of Facilitation of Steering Committee and Head
        - Subdivision of Facilitation of Vice Head, Expert Staffs of Steering Committee, Council of Experts, and Expert Groups
        - Subdivision of Protocol, Material Facilitation, and Leadership Meeting Organizer
      - Division of Public Relation Affairs
        - Subdivision of Media Relation and Public Complaints
      - Division of Administration and Archival Affairs
        - Subdivision of Main Secretariat Administration
        - Subdivision of Deputy I Administration
        - Subdivision of Deputy II Administration
        - Subdivision of Deputy III Administration
        - Subdivision of Deputy IV Administration
        - Subdivision of Deputy V Administration
        - Subdivision of Bureau of Leadership Facilitation, Public Relation, and Administration Affairs Administration
        - Subdivision of Correspondence and Archives
    5. Bureau of Internal Supervision
      - Subdivision of Bureau of Internal Supervision Administration
  4. Deputy I (Relationship between Institutions, Socialization, Communication, and Networking)
    1. Directorate of Relationship between Institutions
    2. Directorate of Socialization and Communication
    3. Directorate of Networking and Cultural Cultivation
  5. Deputy II (Law, Advocation, and Regulation Monitoring)
    1. Directorate of Analysis and Harmonization
    2. Directorate of Advocation
    3. Directorate of Formulation of Policies and Regulations Recommendation
  6. Deputy III (Studies and Materials)
    1. Directorate of Policy Studies of Pancasila Ideology Development
    2. Directorate of Studies of Pancasila Ideology Development Material
    3. Directorate of Assessment of Pancasila Ideology Development Implementation
  7. Deputy IV (Education and Training)
    1. Directorate of Planning, Standardization, and Curriculum Affairs of Ideological Education and Training
    2. Directorate of National Flag Hoisting Troop Program
    3. Directorate of Education and Training Execution
  8. Deputy V (Control and Evaluation)
    1. Directorate of Control
    2. Directorate of Evaluation
    3. Directorate of Pancasila Institutionalization Measurement
  9. Data and Information Center
    - Subdivision of Data and Information Center Administration
  10. Expert Groups
    1. Expert Group on Religion, Philosophy, Ideology, and Cultures
    2. Expert Group on Law, Politics, and Governance
    3. Expert Group on Social Affairs, Economy, and Technology
    4. Expert Group on Language, Education, Arts and Design, Information, and Communications
    5. Expert Group on Defense, Security, and International Relations

== Issues ==
=== Connection with BRIN ===
With the enforcement of Presidential Decree No. 33/2021, the National Research and Innovation Agency (Indonesian: Badan Riset dan Inovasi nasional, BRIN) also coordinated with Pancasila Ideology Development Agency. Both agency initially shared the same Steering Committee. With the revision of the BRIN constituting document thru Presidential Decree No. 78/2021, the BRIN Steering Committee altered, and save only the Head of BRIN Steering Committee position to be filled with the Head of BPIP Steering Committee, while other steering committee now mixed from Ministry of Finance, Ministry of National Development Planning, academicians, and professionals.

=== BPIP Involvement in 2022 Curriculum Reform ===
For 2022 Curriculum Reform, BPIP developed Pancasila education materials. 15 Pancasila learning books were produced, as result of BPIP research and development. The materials designed for cover Pancasila education for Early Childhood Education, Elementary Education, Junior High Education, Middle High Education and Vocational Education, and Higher Education level. The books launched on 1 June 2022.

In occasion of 2022 Pancasila Day celebration, on 3 June 2022, Ministry of Education, Culture, Research, and Technology announced that Pancasila studies officially returned to all level of Indonesia education system after being removed since reformasi. The ministry, through its Agency of Education Standards, Curriculum, and Assessments (Indonesian: Badan Standar, Kurikulum, dan Asesmen Pendidikan, BSKAP) announced that the books will be used for new mandatory course Pancasila studies, replaced the previous modeled civic studies course.

== Gallery ==
Seal of UKP-PIP (2017–2018)

Seal of BPIP (2020–2021)

Seal of BPIP (2021–2024)

Seal of BPIP (2024–present)
