= Sahal Mahfudh =

Indonesian Islamic cleric

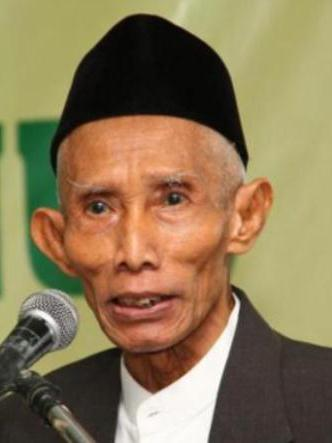
K.H. Sahal Mahfudh

Sahal Mahfudh (December 17, 1937 – January 24, 2014) was an Indonesian cleric. He was the spiritual leader (rais aam') – the most senior cleric – of the Nahdlatul Ulama, Indonesia's largest Muslim majority organization, from 1999 to the time of his death in 2014. He was also chairman of the Indonesian Ulema Council (MUI). He took over the Maslakul Huda boarding school from his father, Kiai Mahfudz Salam, in 1963.

Sahal was born in Pati, Central Java, Dutch East Indies, and died at his residence in the Maslakul Huda Islamic boarding school in Kajen, Margoyoso in Pati Regency, Central Java. He had previously been treated at the Dr. Kariadi General Hospital in Semarang for lung and heart problems.

Sahal never entered politics.

Non-profit organization positions
Preceded by Ali Yafie	Chairman of the Indonesian Ulema Council; 2000–2014	Succeeded by Din Syamsuddin
Preceded by Ilyas Ruhiat	General Leader of Nahdlatul Ulama; 1999–2014	Succeeded by Mustofa Bisri
