= Accrediting Commission of Career Schools and Colleges =

501(c)(3) nonprofit organization in the United States

- Abbreviation: ACCSC
- Tax ID no.: 52-1828939
- Legal status: 501(c)(3) nonprofit organization
- Headquarters: Arlington County, Virginia, U.S.
- Coordinates: 38°53′33″N 77°05′05″W
- Executive Director: Michale S. McComis
- Chair of the Commission: Vickie Clements
- Revenue: $7.71 million (2022)
- Expenses: $6,56 million (2022)
- Employees: 33 (2016)
- Volunteers: 96 (2016)
- Website: www.accsc.org

The Accrediting Commission of Career Schools and Colleges (ACCSC) is a private, 501(c)(3) nonprofit organization in the United States that provides national accreditation to private post-secondary educational institutions. It is recognized by the United States Department of Education as an independent accrediting agency. Established in 1965, the commission is headquartered in Arlington County, Virginia.

The U.S. Department of Education identifies the scope of ACCSC recognition as the accreditation of private post-secondary institutions offering non-degree programs or associate, bachelor's and master's degrees in programs that are "predominantly organized to educate students for occupational, trade and technical careers, and institutions that offer programs via distance education."

In 2021, the accrediting agency received a 3-year renewal from the National Advisory Committee on Institutional Quality and Integrity (NACIQI).

ACCSC reports that it is "the institutional accrediting body for over 650 post-secondary, trade and technical schools that provide education to over 150,000 students." NACIQI reports that ACCSC "currently oversees 370 institutions that receive a total of $2.76 billion per year in Title IV funds."

== Controversies ==
The University of Northern New Jersey, which claimed to have been accredited by the commission, never actually offered any classes. The University of Northern New Jersey was actually a front organization used by federal investigators to trap individuals engaged in student visa fraud. The executive director of the ACCSC stated that it had listed the University of Northern New Jersey as being accredited on its website in order to cooperate with the federal investigation.

The University of Farmington was another front organization used by federal investigators to trap individuals engaged in student visa fraud. Federal prosecutors said that over 600 students enrolled at the University of Farmington only to obtain a visa to the United States and not to actually study. The ACCSC also listed the University of Farmington as having been accredited.

== Student outcomes ==
At the NACIQI meeting for ACCSC in July 2021, centrist think tank Third Way reported that "40 percent of all ACCSC institutions enrolled low-income students who were failing to earn as much as a high school graduate even 10 years after enrollment."

== Government scrutiny ==
Three ACCSC clients, the Center for Excellence in Higher Education, owned by Independence University, Premier Education Group, and Vatterott College, have faced federal government investigations.

== See also ==
- List of recognized accreditation associations of higher learning
