= Rembang Regency =

Regency in Central Java, Indonesia

Rembang Regency Kabupaten Rembang
- Regency
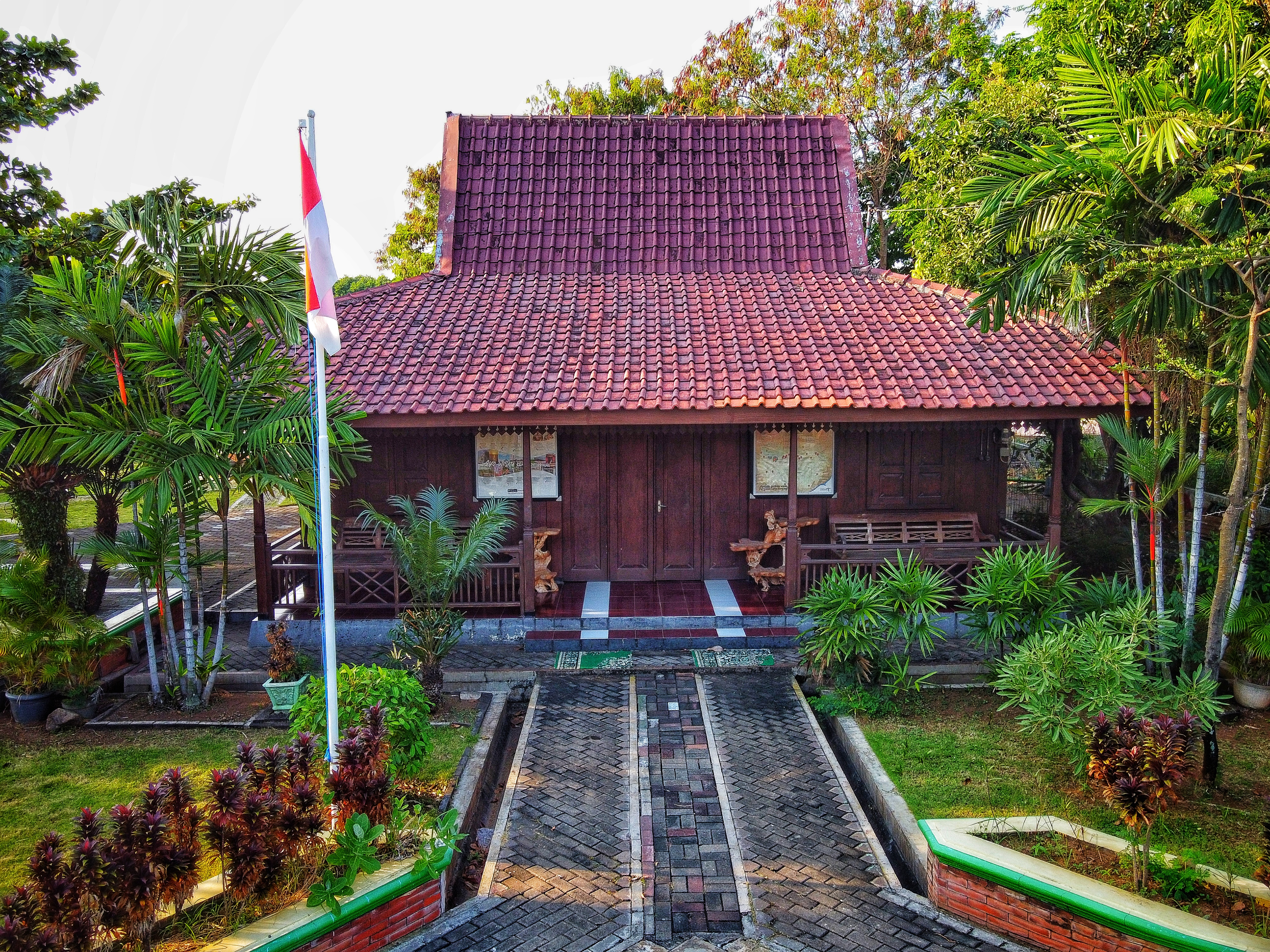
- Rembang Traditional house

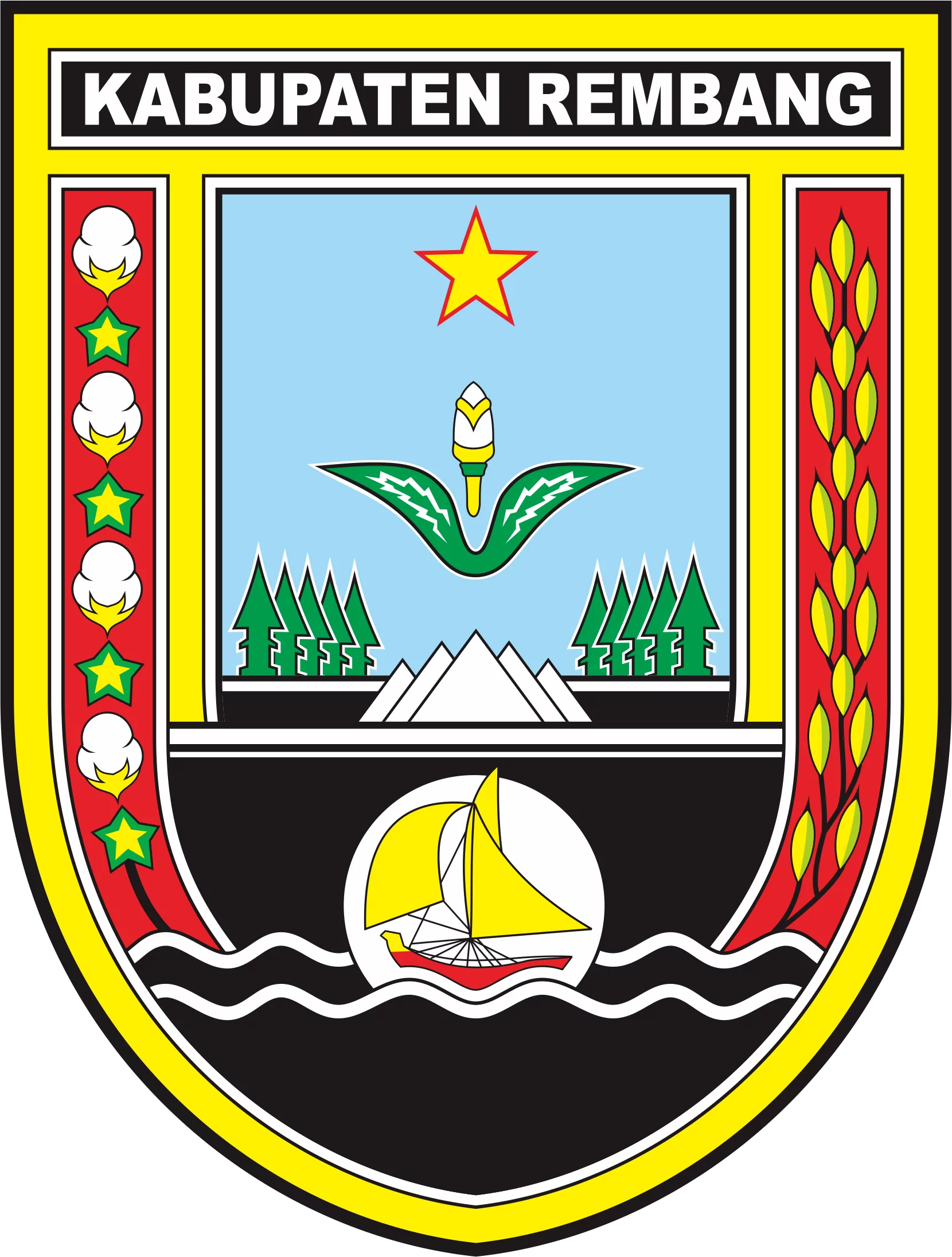
- Coat of arms

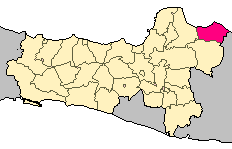
- Location within Central Java

- Location in Java Location in Indonesia
- Coordinates: 6°43′00″S 111°21′00″E
- Country: Indonesia
- Province: Central Java
- Capital: Rembang

Government
  - Regent: Harno
  - Vice Regent: Hanies Cholil Barro

Area
  - Total: 1,036.70 km^{2} (400.27 sq mi)

Population (mid 2025 estimate)
  - Total: 670,095
  - Density: 646.373/km^{2} (1,674.10/sq mi)
- Time zone: UTC+7 (IWST)
- Area code: (+62) 295, 356
- Website: rembangkab.go.id

Rembang Regency (Indonesian: Kabupaten Rembang) is a regency (Indonesian: kabupaten) on the extreme northeast coast of Central Java Province, on the island of Java (bordering on the Java Sea) in Indonesia. The regency covers an area of 1,036.70 km^{2} on Java, and it had a population of 591,359 at the 2010 Census and 645,333 at the 2020 Census; the official estimate as of mid 2025 was 670,095 (of whom 336,601 were males and 333,494 were females). Its administrative capital is the town of Rembang.

== Geography ==
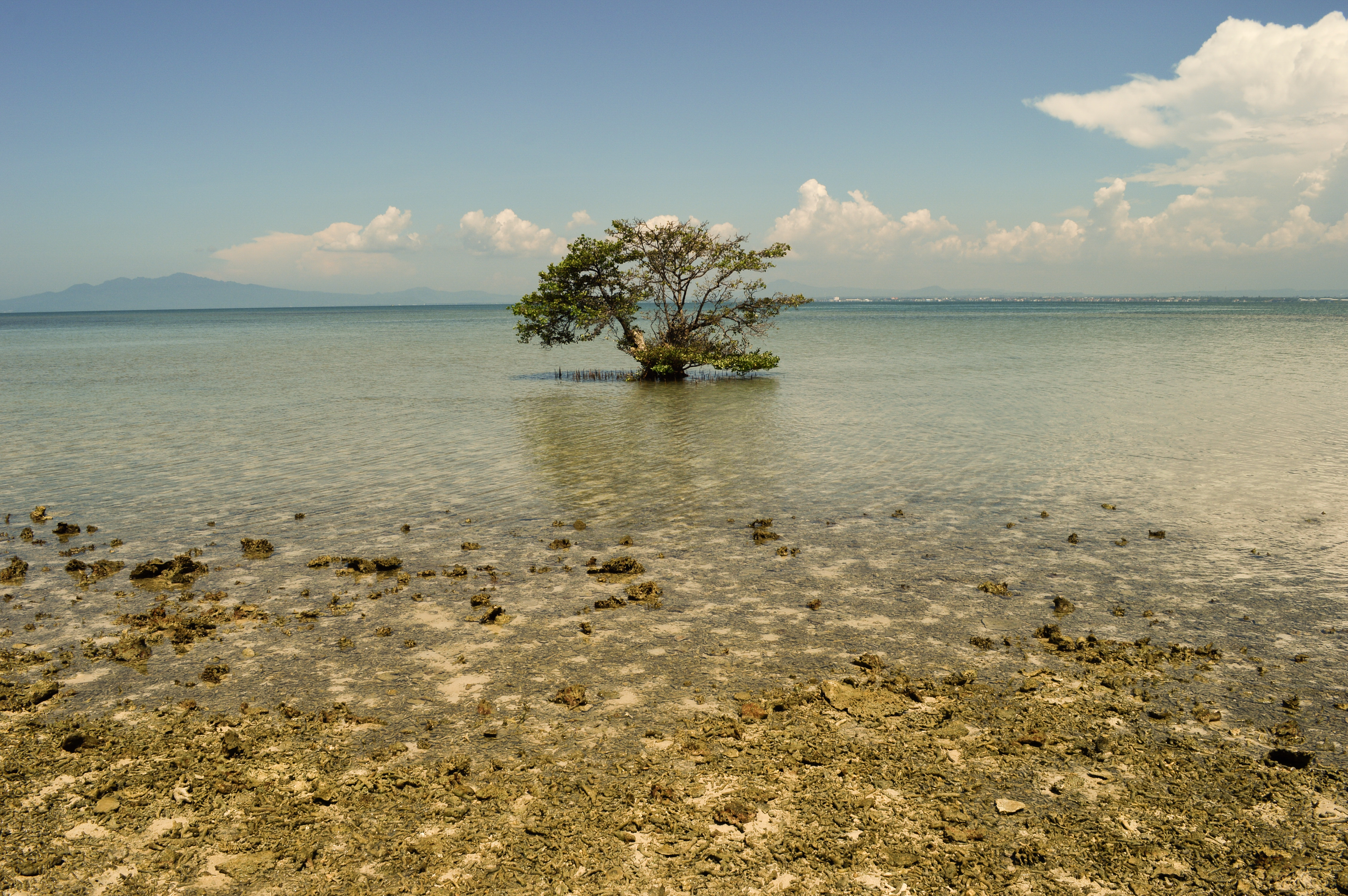
Java Sea coast in Rembang Regency.

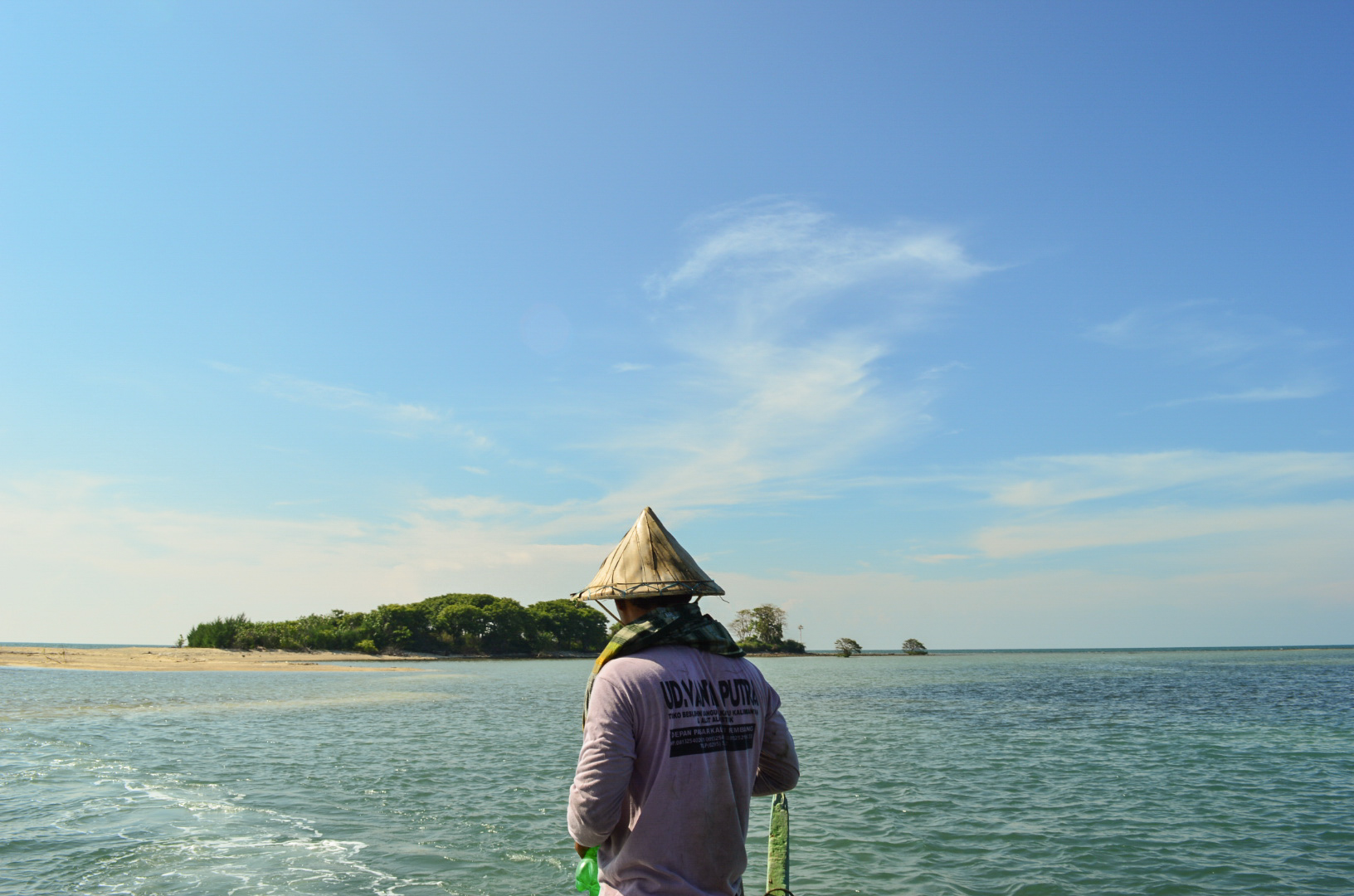
Shoreline with mangrove forest.

It is a lowland, with a maximum elevation of about 70 metres (230 ft) above sea level.

The Solo River flows through its inland section.

The regency is crossed by the North Coast Road, an inter-province main road on the island.

=== Borders ===
Rembang Regency is bordered by:

- North : Java Sea
- East : Tuban Regency in East Java Province
- South : Blora Regency
- West : Pati Regency

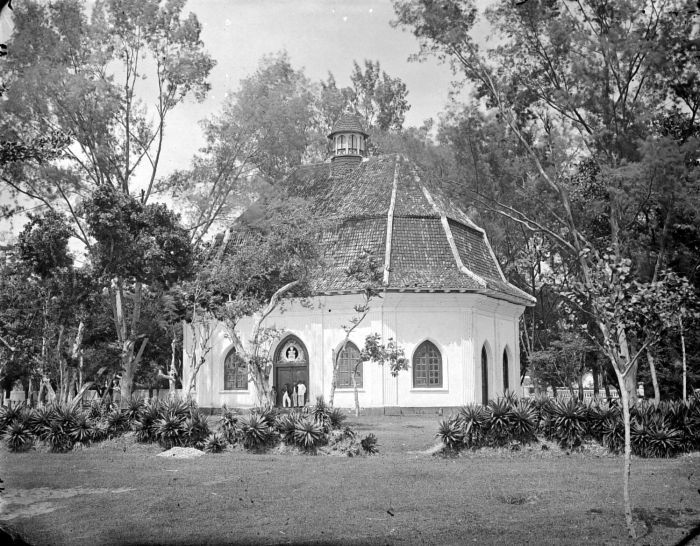
Dutch East Indies colonial church in Lasem (Rembang).

== Administrative districts ==
The regency is divided into fourteen districts (kecamatan), tabulated below with their areas and their populations at the 2010 Census and the 2020 Census, together with the official estimates as of mid 2025. The table also includes the locations of the district administrative centres, the number of administrative villages in each district (totaling 287 rural desa and 7 urban kelurahan - the latter all in Rembang town District), and its post-code.

Kode Wilayah	Name of District (kecamatan)	Area in km^{2}	Pop'n Census 2010	Pop'n Census 2020	Pop'n Estimate mid 2025	Admin centre	No. of villages	Post code
33.17.01	Sumber	78.20	33,586	36,804	38,286	Sumber	18	59253
33.17.02	Bulu	101.10	25,649	28,019	29,103	Bulu	16	59255
33.17.03	Gunem	84.73	22,743	24,263	24,915	Gunem	16	59263
33.17.04	Sale	109.01	35,756	38,922	40,359	Sale	15	59265
33.17.05	Sarang	92.86	60,063	62,889	63,996	Kalipang	23	59274
33.17.06	Sedan	87.37	51,143	55,255	57,087	Sidorejo	21	59264
33.17.07	Pamotan	80.60	43,959	49,745	52,560	Pamotan	23	59261
33.17.08	Sulang	84.81	36,764	39,124	40,127	Sulang	21	59254
33.17.09	Kaliori	61.72	38,615	42,206	43,851	Tambakagung	23	59252
33.17.10	Rembang (town)	61.71	83,942	91,905	95,565	Leteh	34 ^{(a)}	59211: 59219
33.17.11	Pancur	43.00	27,345	30,808	32,482	Pancur	23	59262
33.17.12	Kragan	67.08	58,232	65,499	69,003	Balongmulyo	27	59273
33.17.13	Sluke	38.28	26,620	29,512	30,874	Sluke	14	59272
33.17.14	Lasem	46.23	46,942	50,382	51,887	Soditan	20	59271
	Totals	1,036.70	591,359	645,333	670,095	Rembang	294	

Note: (a) Rembang (town) District comprises 7 urban kelurahan (Gegunung Kulon, Kutoharjo, Leteh, Magersari, Pacar, Sidowayah and Tanjungsari) and 27 rural desa.

== Climate ==
Rembang has a tropical monsoon climate (Am) with moderate to little rainfall from May to October and heavy rainfall from November to April.

Climate data for Rembang
Month	Jan	Feb	Mar	Apr	May	Jun	Jul	Aug	Sep	Oct	Nov	Dec	Year
Mean daily maximum °C (°F)	31.1 (88.0)	31.0 (87.8)	31.3 (88.3)	32.0 (89.6)	32.0 (89.6)	32.0 (89.6)	32.3 (90.1)	33.1 (91.6)	34.2 (93.6)	34.4 (93.9)	33.7 (92.7)	32.2 (90.0)	32.4 (90.4)
Daily mean °C (°F)	26.9 (80.4)	26.9 (80.4)	27.0 (80.6)	27.4 (81.3)	27.3 (81.1)	26.9 (80.4)	26.6 (79.9)	27.0 (80.6)	27.9 (82.2)	28.4 (83.1)	28.3 (82.9)	27.4 (81.3)	27.3 (81.2)
Mean daily minimum °C (°F)	22.7 (72.9)	22.8 (73.0)	22.8 (73.0)	22.8 (73.0)	22.6 (72.7)	21.8 (71.2)	20.9 (69.6)	20.9 (69.6)	21.6 (70.9)	22.5 (72.5)	23.0 (73.4)	22.7 (72.9)	22.3 (72.1)
Average rainfall mm (inches)	263 (10.4)	206 (8.1)	197 (7.8)	129 (5.1)	105 (4.1)	72 (2.8)	35 (1.4)	23 (0.9)	36 (1.4)	69 (2.7)	138 (5.4)	219 (8.6)	1,492 (58.7)
Source: Climate-Data.org

== Lasem ==
Ceremonial double ikat man's head cloth from 1880s Lasem.

During the colonial Dutch East Indies period, the area was known as Lasem.

The Han family of Lasem was a prominent Chinese immigrant family of colonial government bureaucrats and landlords in the area.
