= List of universities accredited by DEAC =

The Distance Education Accrediting Commission is an accrediting agency recognized by the Council for Higher Education Accreditation (CHEA) and the U.S. Department of Education (USDE). The agency accredits institutions from the primary level through universities. This list includes the degree-granting institutions (universities) accredited by the DEAC.

== Accredited, Degree-Granting Institutions ==
List of degree-granting institutions with current accreditation
School	Location	Control	Founded	Initial Accreditation	References
Abraham Lincoln University	Glendale, CA	Private for-profit	1996	2011	
Acacia University	Tempe, AZ		2003	2010	
Agora University	Burke, VA	Private non-profit	2012	2023	
American College of Healthcare Sciences	Portland, OR	Private for-profit	1978	2003	
American National University	Salem, VA	Private for-profit	1886	2018	
Anaheim University	Anaheim, CA	Private for-profit	1996	2009	
Antioch School of Church Planting and Leadership Development	Ames, IA		2006	2010	
Ashworth College	Norcross, GA	Private for-profit	1987	2001	
Aspen University	Denver, CO	Private for-profit	1987	1993	
Atlantic University	Virginia Beach, VA	Private	1930	1994	
California Coast University	Santa Ana, CA	Private for-profit	1973	2005	
California Miramar University	San Diego, CA	Private for-profit	2005	2019	
Chi University	Reddick, FL		1998	2019	
City Vision University	Kansas City, MO	Private not-for-profit	1998	2005	
College of Court Reporting	Valaparaiso, IN	Private for-profit	1984	2018	
Crestmont University	Sioux Falls, SD	Private for-profit	2003	2009	
Cummings Graduate Institute for Behavioral Health Studies	Phoenix, AZ		2014	2019	
Doral College	Doral, FL	Private non-profit	2011	2018	
Dunlap-Stone University	Phoenix, AZ		1995	2003	
EC-Council University	Albuquerque, NM		2003	2015	
Elmbridge University	Lehi, UT	Private	2018	2023	
Frontier Institute of Technology	Jackson, WY	Private non-profit	2024	2025	
Genesis University	Miami Beach, FL		2007	2012	
Grace Communion Seminary	Charlotte, NC		1947	2012	
University of Arkansas Grantham	Lenexa, KS	Public	1951	1961	
Harrison Middleton University	Tempe, AZ	Private non-profit	1998	2003	
Humboldt International University	Miami, FL	Private for-profit	2012	2024	
Institute of Brain Education	Sedona, AZ	Private for-profit	2007	2026	
Instituto Profesional Latinoamericano de Comercio Exterior	Santiago, Chile	Private	1990	2025	
International Sports Sciences Association	Carpinteria, CA	Private for-profit	1988	2009	
Jala University	Honolulu, HI	Private non-profit	2021	2026	
Jose Maria Vargas University	Pembroke Pines, FL	Private for-profit	2003	2024	
Lakewood University	Cleveland Heights, OH		1998	2008	
Laurus College	Santa Maria, CA	Private for-profit	2006	2018	
Lionel University	Santa Barbara, CA	Private for-profit	1988	2009	
Maalot College	Phoenix, AZ	Private non-profit	2022	2026	
Madison School of Healthcare	Norcross, GA		2016	2017	
Maestro University	Salt Lake City, UT	Private for-profit	1994	1998	
Martinsburg College	Cheyenne, WY	Private for-profit	1980	2010	
Miami Business Technological University	Plantation, FL	Private for-profit	2017	2026	
MIU City University	Miami, FL	Private for-profit	2014	2023	
Moreland University	Washington, DC		2012	2017	
National Juris University	Phoenix, AZ		2012	2013	
National Paralegal College	Phoenix, AZ	Private for-profit	2002	2006	
NationsUniversity	New Orleans, LA		1996	2015	
Newlane University	Lehi, Utah	Private for-profit	2016	2023	
Nexford University	Washington, DC	Private for-profit	2017	2023	
Patten University	Covina, CA	Private non-profit	1969	1998	
Penn Foster College	Scottsdale, AZ	Private for-profit	1890	1977	
Quantic School of Business and Technology	Washington, DC		2013	2020	
Redemption Seminary	Mesa, AZ	Private non-profit	2018	2024	
Rhombus University	La Mesa, CA	Private for-profit	2018	2022	
Rockbridge International Seminary	Springfield, MO		2003	2013	
Saint Athanasius and Saint Cyril Coptic Orthodox Theological School	Irvine, CA	Private non-profit	1989	2024	
San Diego Global Knowledge University	San Diego, CA	Private for-profit	2007	2023	
San Ignacio University	Doral, FL	Private for-profit	2007	2023	
Sessions College for Professional Design	Tempe, AZ	Private for-profit	1997	2001	
Setanta College	Limerick, Ireland	Private for-profit	2006		
Sonoran Desert Institute	Tempe, AZ	Private for-profit	2000	2004	
Southwest University of Naprapathic Medicine	Santa Fe, NM	Private for-profit	2010	2021	
SUMMA University	Doral, FL	Private for-profit	2016	2025	
Sura College	Scottsdale, AZ	Private for-profit	2020	2025	
Swiss School of Management	Dallas, TX	Private for-profit	1981	2024	
Taft Law School	Santa Ana, CA		1984	2003	
The Art of Education University	Osage, IA		2011	2018	
Thirdmill Seminary	Casselberry, FL	Private non-profit	2018	2023	
U.S. Career Institute	Fort Collins, CO		1981	2004	
Union University of California	Westminster, CA		1986	2016	
United Medical Institute	Fair Oaks, CA	Private for-profit	2006	2023	
Universidad San Ignacio de Loyola	Lima, Peru	Private	1995	2025	
University of Arkansas System eVersity	Little Rock, AR		2014	2018	
University of Fairfax	Salem, VA		2002	2012	
University of Management and Technology	Arlington, VA	Private for-profit	1998	2002	
UTH Florida University	Miami, FL	Private for-profit	2014	2025	
Valar Institute	Washington, D.C.	Private for-profit	2013	2020	
Viridis Graduate Institute	Ojai, CA		2011	2019	
Western Institute for Social Research	Berkeley, CA	Private not-for-profit	1975	2024	
Westfield Business School	Miami, FL	Private for-profit	2009	2024	
William Carey International University	Pasadena, CA		1977	2020	
William Howard Taft University	Lakewood, CO	Private for-profit	1984	2003	
WorldQuant University	New Orleans, LA		2015	2021	

== Accredited, Postsecondary Institutions ==
- Calbright College (CA)
- Blackstone Career Institute, Allentown (PA)
- Gemological Institute of America (GIA)
- National Tax Training School (NJ)
- New York Institute of Photography (NY)

== Formerly Accredited Institutions ==
- American Business and Technology University (St. Joseph, MO)
- American Military University (Charles Town, WV)
- American Public University (Charles Town, WV)
- American Sentinel University (Denver, CO)
- Apollos University (Great Falls, MT)
- Art Instruction Schools (MN)
- Babel University Professional School of Translation (Honolulu, HI)
- Brighton College (Scottsdale, AZ)
- California Southern University (CA)
- Catholic International University (Charles Town, WV)
- Columbia Southern University (Orange Beach, AL)
- Deakin University (Victoria, Australia)
- Ellis University, Chicago (IL)
- Hawthorn University (Whitethorn, CA)
- Henley-Putnam University (San Jose, CA)
- Holmes Institute (Golden, CO)
- Huntington University of Health Sciences (Knoxville, TN)
- McKinley College (Fort Collins, CO)
- Naaleh College (North Miami Beach, FL)
- Sarasota University (Sarasota, FL)
- Shiloh University (Kalona, IA)
- Southwest University (Louisiana) (LA)
- University of Philosophical Research (Los Angeles, CA)
- University of St. Augustine for Health Sciences (St. Augustine, FL)
- University of the People (Pasadena, CA)
- Westcliff University (Irvine, CA)
- Western Governors University (Salt Lake City, UT)
- Wright Graduate University for the Realization of Human Potential (Elkhorn, WI)
