= List of for-profit universities and colleges =

Overview of the world's for-profit universities and colleges

This is a list of for-profit institutions of higher education.

== In the United States ==
- Academy of Art University – San Francisco, California
- American Career College – Los Angeles, California
- American InterContinental University – more than 90% online, a subsidiary of Perdoceo
- American National University – distance education and multiple locations in Virginia, Ohio, Kentucky, Indiana, and West Virginia; not to be confused with American University or National American University
- American Public University – online, a division of American Public University System; not to be confused with American University
- American University of Health Sciences – Signal Hill, California
- Aspen University – Denver, Colorado
- Berkeley College – New York and New Jersey; not to be confused with University of California, Berkeley, Berklee College of Music, Berkeley College at Yale University, or Berkeley City College
- Blue Cliff College – a subsidiary of Quad Partners
- Brookline College – Arizona and New Mexico
- Burrell College of Osteopathic Medicine – Las Cruces, New Mexico
- California Miramar University – San Diego, California (formerly known as Pacific Western University)
- California Northstate University College of Medicine – Elk Grove, California
- Capella University – Minneapolis, Minnesota and online
- Carrington College – 17 locations in the United States
- Central Penn College – Enola, Pennsylvania
- Chamberlain University – a subsidiary of Adtalem
- Charter College – campuses in Alaska, California, and Washington
- The College of Westchester – White Plains, New York not to be confused with West Chester University in West Chester, Pennsylvania
- Colorado Technical University – more than 90% online, a subsidiary of Perdoceo
- Columbia Southern University – not to be confused with Columbia University
- Conservatory of Recording Arts and Sciences – Tempe, Arizona
- Denver College of Nursing – Denver, Colorado and Houston, Texas
- DeVry University – multiple locations, subsidiaries include Keller School of Management (several campuses have closed)
- DigiPen Institute of Technology – Redmond, Washington
- Eagle Gate College – Utah
- ECPI University – formerly ECPI College of Technology; multiple locations; includes Medical Careers Institute multiple locations in Virginia
- Engine City Technical Institute – South Plainfield, New Jersey – now Lincoln Technical Institute
- Five Towns College – Dix Hills, New York
- Florida Career College – multiple locations, owned by International Education Corporation
- Florida National University – Hialeah, Florida
- Fortis College – multiple locations
- Fox College – Chicago metropolitan area (Bedford Park and Tinley Park)
- Full Sail University – Winter Park, Florida
- Hamilton College – Iowa; now part of Kaplan University; formerly operated from multiple locations in Iowa and Nebraska; not to be confused with Hamilton College in Clinton, New York, or with the unaccredited Hamilton University, now Kaplan University
- Idaho College of Osteopathic Medicine – Meridian, Idaho
- International Education Corporation operates US Colleges, Florida Career Colleges, United Education Institute and UEI Colleges
- Lincoln Tech – multiple locations; not to be confused with Lincoln University
- Los Angeles Film School – Los Angeles, California
- McCann School of Business and Technology – multiple locations
- Mildred Elley – multiple locations
- Miller-Motte – multiple locations
- Monroe University – multiple locations
- National American University – primarily online. Not to be confused with American University
- National University College – multiple locations, Puerto Rico
- Neumont University – multiple locations
- NewSchool of Architecture and Design – San Diego, California; owned by Ambow Education. Not to be confused with The New School
- Ohio Business College – multiple locations
- Pacific College of Health and Science – a subsidiary of Quad Partners
- Pennco Tech – multiple locations
- Pima Medical Institute – multiple locations
- Pinnacle Career Institute – Kansas, multiple locations
- Plaza College – Forest Hills, New York
- Porter and Chester Institute – Connecticut, Massachusetts
- Post University – Waterbury, Connecticut, not to be confused with LIU Post
- Potomac College – Washington, D.C. area, now the University of the Potomac
- Provo College – Provo, Utah
- Rasmussen College – multiple locations, now owned by American Public University System.
- Rocky Mountain College of Art and Design, Lakewood, Colorado
- Rocky Mountain University of Health Professions – Utah
- Rocky Vista University College of Osteopathic Medicine – Parker, Colorado
- SAE Institute – formerly the School of Audio Engineering
- Salem International University – Salem, West Virginia
- San Joaquin Valley College – California, multiple locations
- Schiller International University – multiple locations
- School of Visual Arts – New York City
- Sofia University - Palo Alto, California
- South College – Knoxville, Tennessee; not to be confused with Southern University or the University of the South.
- South University – multiple locations; owned by Education Principle Foundation (EPF); not to be confused with Southern University or the University of the South.
- Southern Careers Institute – Texas, multiple locations; not to be confused with Southern University or the University of the South.
- Southern States University – California; not to be confused with Southern University or the University of the South.
- Southwestern College – multiple locations; not to be confused with Southwestern University or Lincoln University
- Spartan College of Aeronautics and Technology – Tulsa, Oklahoma
- Strayer University – multiple locations
- Sullivan University – Kentucky, multiple locations
- Suncoast College of Health – Bradenton, Florida; Brandon, Florida
- UEI College – multiple campuses in California
- Unitek College – campuses in California and Reno, Nevada
- United States University; not to be confused with American University
- Universal Technical Institute – campuses in Arizona, California, Florida, Massachusetts, North Carolina, Pennsylvania, and Texas
- University of Advancing Technology – Tempe, Arizona
- University of Phoenix – Phoenix, Arizona
- University of the Potomac – Washington DC; Vienna, Virginia; online- a division of Linden Education
- University of Silicon Valley – San Jose, California; formerly Cogswell Polytechnical College
- Wade College – Dallas, Texas
- West Coast University – Los Angeles, California
- Western State College of Law – Irvine, California; not to be confused with Western Governors University
- Western State University College of Law – Fullerton, California; not to be confused with Western Governors University
- Wyoming Technical Institute (WyoTech) – As of 2018, the school has only one campus (under new ownership)

== Distance education (online) ==
- American College of Technology – online distance education, based in St. Joseph, Missouri; not to be confused with American University
- American College of Education – online; not to be confused with American University
- American Public University System – includes the American Military University and American Public University; distance education; offices in Charles Town, West Virginia, and Manassas, Virginia; not to be confused with American University
- American Sentinel University – distance education, based in Denver, Colorado
- Ashworth College – online, based in Norcross, Georgia
- Aspen University – online, based in Denver, Colorado
- California InterContinental University – online, based in Diamond Bar, California
- California Southern University – online; not to be confused with The University of Southern California
- Capella University – online
- London School of Business and Finance – online; not to be confused with London School of Economics or London Business School
- Maestro University – formerly Andrew Jackson University; distance education; based in Hoover, Alabama
- New England College of Business and Finance; not to be confused with New England College
- Setanta College – online
- Trident University International – formerly TUI University, formerly Touro University International; online; not to be confused with Trident Technical College
- University of Liverpool – distance education only, a division of Laureate Education
- University of the Potomac – distance education offices in Washington, D.C., and Vienna, Virginia with remote administration offices as well
- U.S. Career Institute – Fort Collins, Colorado
- Walden University – online, a division of Adtalem Education

== Outside the United States ==
- Adamson University - Manila, Philippines
- AMA Education System - multiple locations in the Philippines and Bahrain
- Anhembi Morumbi University – São Paulo, Brazil
- Arden University – United Kingdom (part of Global University Systems group).
- Arellano University - multiple locations in Metro Manila, Philippines
- Baliaug University - Bulacan, Philippines
- BPP University – United Kingdom (part of Apollo Education Group).
- Central Colleges of the Philippines - Quezon City, Philippines
- Centro Escolar University - Manila, Makati and Las Piñas, Philippines
- Cyprus College – Nicosia, Cyprus
- Dnyaneshwar Vidyapeeth – India
- Emilio Aguinaldo College - Manila and Cavite, Philippines
- FEATI University - Manila, Philippines
- FEU Group of Schools - Metro Manila and Cavite, Philippines
- ISM University of Management and Economics – Vilnius, Lithuania
- International School of Law and Business – Vilnius, Lithuania (to be closed in July 2024)
- Jose Rizal University - Mandaluyong, Philippines
- Kazimieras Simonavičius University – Vilnius, Lithuania
- Laureate International Universities – Peru and Mexico
- London School of Business and Finance – United Kingdom (part of Global University Systems group). not to be confused with London School of Economics or London Business School
- Lyceum of the Philippines University - multiple locations in the Philippines
- iPeople Inc.
  - Malayan Colleges Laguna - Laguna, Philippines
  - Mapua University - Manila, Philippines
  - National Teachers College - Manila, Philippines
  - University of Nueva Caceres - Camarines Sur, Philippines
- Manuel S. Enverga University - Quezon, Philippines
- Multimedia University – multiple locations in Malaysia
- National University (Philippines) - multiple locations in the Philippines
- Nyenrode Business University – Breukelen, Netherlands
- Our Lady of Fatima University - multiple locations in the Philippines
- Philippine Women's University - Manila, Philippines
- PHINMA Education Network
  - Saint Jude College - Manila, Philippines
  - Araullo University - Cabanatuan, Philippines
  - Cagayan de Oro College - Cagayan de Oro, Philippines
  - University of Iloilo - Iloilo City, Philippines
  - University of Pangasinan - Dagupan, Philippines
  - Southwestern University - Cebu City, Philippines
- Rai University – India
- Regenesys Business School – Sandton, South Africa
- Ross University – Ross University School of Medicine in Picard, Dominica; Ross University School of Veterinary Medicine in Saint Kitts
- Sigmund Freud University Vienna - Vienna, Austria
- St. George's University – Grenada; includes medical school, school of veterinary medicine, and other programs
- STI College - multiple locations in the Philippines
  - iAcademy - Makati, Philippines
- St Patrick's College, London – United Kingdom (part of Global University Systems group).
- Taylor's University – multiple locations in Malaysia
- Technological Institute of the Philippines - Manila and Quezon City, Philippines
- Trinity School of Medicine - St. Vincent and Grenadines
- Universidad de Zamboanga - Zamboanga, Philippines
- Universidad Europea de Madrid – Madrid, Spain
- University of the East - Manila, Philippines
- University of Medicine and Health Sciences - Basseterre, Saint Kitts, Caribbean
- University of Baguio - Baguio, Philippines
- University of Law – United Kingdom (part of Global University Systems group).
- University of Mindanao - multiple locations in Mindanao, Philippines
- University of Perpetual Help System - multiple locations in the Philippines

In India many educational trusts and institutions which have no accreditation give autonomous degrees for profit.

In Chile many universities are suspected of violating legislation that forbids profitmaking in such institutions.

== For-profit colleges that became non-profit colleges ==
Conversions from for-profit to nonprofit are legitimate when the assets and income are fully committed to the educational purpose, and control by private interests is eliminated. Some converted nonprofits may not be legitimate. A Government Accountability Office report about the problem is anticipated.

- Ashford University became non-profit in 2018 and was subsequently acquired by the University of Arizona in 2020.
- Baker College in Michigan became nonprofit in 1977.
- Bryant & Stratton College – multiple locations. The school has converted to nonprofit.
- Community Care College and its affiliated institutions (Clary Sage College and Oklahoma Technical College) converted to nonprofit in 2015.
- Concord Law School – online, part of Purdue University Global.
- Herzing University converted to nonprofit in 2015.
- Hult International Business School - Converted to nonprofit in 2014.
- Keiser University (converted in 2011). After the conversion the school owner remained involved in the school as a landlord, contractor, and chancellor.
- Kendall College – Chicago, Illinois, formerly owned by Laureate Education, purchased by National Louis University in 2018.
- Purdue University Global- formerly Kaplan University (converted in 2018, granted IRS tax-exempt status in 2019). Under a long-term contract, the former owner continues to manage much of its operation, causing critics to question the college's integrity as a nonprofit.
- Remington Colleges claimed nonprofit status in 2010.
- South University converted in 2017, but that purchase collapsed and ownership changed. The accreditor lists the school as for-profit as of December 2020.
- Southern New Hampshire University (converted in 1968)
- Sunstate Academy was purchased by the family-run Compass-Rose Foundation in 2003.
- Ultimate Medical Academy switched from nonprofit to for-profit in 2005, and then converted back in 2015.
- Waldorf University – Forrest City, Iowa, In 2010, it was sold to Columbia Southern University and became a for-profit institution; twelve years later, on January 1, 2022, ownership was transferred to the Waldorf Lutheran College Foundation, returning the university to its non-profit roots.

== Closed or merged ==
- ASA College – campuses in Brooklyn, midtown Manhattan, and Miami
- Allied American University – Laguna Hills, California, closed 2016
- Altierus Career College-formerly part of Corinthian Colleges, last campuses closed in 2022.
- American Sentinel University – merged with Post University in March 2021, becoming the American Sentinel College of Nursing & Health Sciences.
- Anthem Institute – formerly the Chubb Institute; multiple locations, closed 2014
- Antonelli College – multiple locations
- Arizona Summit Law School – a subsidiary of InfiLaw System
- Argosy University – closed 2019
- Art Institutes – became non-profit in 2017; remaining campuses closed in 2023
- Ashmead College – multiple locations, closed
- ATI Enterprises – campuses in Arizona, Florida, and Texas, closed
- Banner College – Arlington, Virginia, closed
- Banner Institute – Chicago, closed
- Bay State College – Boston, Massachusetts, owned by Ambow Education
- Bethany University - Scotts Valley, CA
- Blair College – Colorado Springs, Colorado – Acquired by Everest College, which closed in 2015.
- Branford Hall Career Institute- multiple campuses, closed 2020
- Bradford School (Columbus) – Columbus, Ohio; closed 2020
- Bradford School (Pittsburgh) – Pittsburgh, Pennsylvania; closed 2019
- Briarcliffe College – Long Island, New York; a subsidiary of Career Education Corporation; closed 2016
- Brightwood College – closed in 2018
- Broadview College – Utah
- Brooks Institute of Photography – multiple locations, closed in 2016
- Brown Mackie College – multiple locations, a subsidiary of Education Management Corporation, closed in 2017
- Bryman College – multiple locations; not to be confused with The Bryman School in Arizona, closed in 2014
- Collins College – Phoenix, Arizona area
- Charlotte School of Law – subsidiary of InfiLaw System
- Corinthian Colleges
- Le Cordon Bleu – multiple locations, subsidiary of Career Education Corporation; closed 2017
- Crown College – Tacoma, Washington; lost accreditation in 2007 and closed
- Daniel Webster College – Nashua, New Hampshire, subsidiary of ITT Educational Services, closed 2017
- Daymar College- Campuses in Kentucky, Ohio, Tennessee
- Decker College – 2002
- Everest College – multiple locations, a subsidiary of Corinthian Colleges, closed 2015
- Everest Institute – multiple locations, a subsidiary of Corinthian Colleges, closed 2015
- Everest University – multiple locations
- Fashion Institute of Design & Merchandising (FIDM) – Los Angeles, CA with multiple satellite locations in California, main campus merged into Arizona State University's fashion program while satellite campuses closed
- FastTrain College – Florida, closed in 2014 after FBI raid
- Florida Coastal School of Law – Jacksonville, FL. Subsidiary of InfiLaw System
- Georgia Medical Institute – multiple locations, not to be confused with the Medical College of Georgia at Augusta University, now Everest Institute
- Gibbs College – multiple locations; closed 2009
- Grantham University – merged into University of Arkansas System, 2021
- Harrington College of Design – a subsidiary of Career Education Corporation; closed 2016
- Harris School of Business- multiple campuses, closed 2020
- Harrison College – Indiana; multiple locations; closed 2018
- Heald College – multiple locations, a subsidiary of Corinthian Colleges; closed 2015
- High-Tech Institute – multiple locations, closed
- Independence University converted into a non-profit in 2012, closed 2021
- International Academy of Design and Technology – multiple locations – consolidated with Sanford-Brown, then closed
- ITT Technical Institute – all locations (closed September 6, 2016)
- Kee Business College – multiple locations in Virginia, subsidiary of Corinthian Colleges, Inc.
- King's College – Charlotte, North Carolina (closed December 2018)
- Las Vegas College – locations in Nevada and Texas, became Everest College in 2009
- Miami-Jacobs Career College – closed 2016
- Minneapolis Business College – Roseville, Minnesota, closed 2019
- Missouri College – a subsidiary of Career Education Corporation, closed 2016
- Mount Washington College – multiple locations in New Hampshire, closed 2016
- Mountain West College – Salt Lake City, Utah
- McNally Smith College of Music – Saint Paul, Minnesota
- Miami International University of Art and Design
- National Institute of Technology (United States) – now Everest Institute – multiple locations; not to be confused with National Institutes of Technology in India
- Northwestern College – Chicago, Illinois; not to be confused with Northwestern University
- Olympia Career Training Institute – multiple locations, now Everest College
- Paier College of Art – Hamden, Connecticut, closed 2025
- Parks College – multiple locations; not to be confused with Ithaca College's Roy H. Park School of Communications
- Pioneer Pacific College – multiple locations in Oregon, closed July 2020
- Pittsburgh Technical College was an employee-owned for-profit school before becoming nonprofit in 2017. Closed in 2024.
- Platt College – Southern California multiple locations, Anaheim, Riverside, Ontario, Alhambra, San Diego, Colorado, Closed June 2023
- Redstone College – multiple locations in Colorado, a division of Alta Colleges, Spartan College of Aeronautics and Technology purchased the Broomfield Campus in April 2016
- Sanford-Brown College – multiple locations; subsidiary of Career Education Corporation; not to be confused with either Stanford University or Samford University; closed 2016
- Salter College – closed 2019
- Specs Howard School of Media Arts – Michigan
- Spencerian College – Kentucky, multiple locations; merged into Sullivan University in 2018
- Springfield College – Springfield, Missouri; not to be confused with Springfield College in Springfield, Massachusetts, changed name to Everest College, closed in 2015
- Stevens-Henager College and its affiliates Independence University, CollegeAmerica, and California College San Diego were purchased by a tax-exempt organization in 2012. Nonprofit status was initially declined by the U.S. Department of Education and then granted in 2018. Closed in 2021.
- Stratford University – closed 2022.
- Trump University – New York City, New York; closed 2010
- University of Atlanta – distance education only; not to be confused with Atlanta University Center or Clark Atlanta University
- University of the Rockies – Colorado Springs, Colorado, a subsidiary of Zovio (formerly called Bridgepoint Education) merged with Ashford University.
- Vatterott College – multiple locations – closed 2018
- Victory University – Memphis, Tennessee; closed in 2014
- Virginia College – multiple locations, not to be confused with the University of Virginia; closed in 2018
- Vista College-locations in Texas, New Mexico, and Arkansas; closed 2021
- Washington Technology University – Bellevue, Washington; closed 2022
- Western International University – multiple locations, a subsidiary of Apollo Group; closed 2019
- Western Business College – multiple locations, now Everest College
- Westwood College – multiple locations; closed 2016
- Wood Tobé-Coburn School – New York City, New York; closed 2017
- Wright Career College, converted to non-profit in 1995, closed in 2016.

=== See also ===
- Student loan debt
- List of universities and colleges by country
- For-profit higher education in the United States
