= Pai =

Pai or PAI may refer to:

== People ==
- Pai (surname), Indian surname from coastal Karnataka and Goa plus people with the name
- Pai (Chinese surname), includes Chinese name origin, plus people with the name

== Fictional characters ==
- Pai (Manga character), a character from "3x3 Eyes"
- Pie (Tokyo Mew Mew), a villain from the manga and anime series Tokyo Mew Mew

== Places ==
- Pai, Iran, a village in Isfahan Province
- Pai, Thailand, a small town in Mae Hong Son Province
  - Pai District, the district around the town
  - Pai River
  - Pai Airport
- Pai, Tank, a union council in Pakistan
- Pai Northern Thai Kitchen, a restaurant chain in Toronto, Canada

== Games ==
- Gwat Pai, Chinese dominoes set
- Pai Gow, Chinese gambling game
  - Pai gow poker, Americanized version

== Other uses ==
- Pai languages (Paipai, Walapai, Havasupai)
- Pai dialect of the Northern Sotho language
- Pai (fish trap)
- "Pai", a 2016 song by Bad Gyal

== Acronyms ==
- PAI Partners, a French private equity firm
- PAI (Personal Activity Intelligence), a fitness indicator developed by researcher Ulrik Wisløff
- Parachute Association of Ireland, a representative/regulatory body for skydivers in Ireland
- Parti Africain de l’Indépendance (African Independence Party), a former political party in Bourkina Faso
- PartnerAid International, a German-based Christian humanitarian organization
- Partnership on AI, US-based tech nonprofit committed to responsible AI use
- Pathogenicity island, a distinct class of genomic island which is acquired by horizontal transfer
- Periodic annual increment
- Persatuan Arab Indonesia, an association of Arab Indonesians
- Personality Assessment Inventory, a test given by psychologists
- Photoacoustic imaging
- Plasminogen activator inhibitor-1 (PAI-1), a protein that inhibits fibrinolysis (breakdown of blood clots)
- Plasminogen activator inhibitor-2 (PAI-2), another protein that inhibits fibrinolysis
- Poalei Agudat Yisrael, an Israeli political party
- Polizia dell'Africa Italiana (Italian Police of Africa, police force in the Italian colonies
- Polyamide-imide, a thermoplastic polymer
- Polyatomic ion
- Population Action International
- Primary adrenal insufficiency (primary adrenocortical insufficiency), that is, Addison's disease, a rare endocrine disorder
- Public Accountability Initiative

== See also ==
- Bae (surname)
