= Alissa Jay Abdullah =

Information Security Advisor

- Citizenship: American
- Education: Savannah State University (BSc); George Washington University (MSc); Capella University (Ph.D)
- Occupation: Chief information security officer
- Years active: 1994 – Present
- Employer: MasterCard
- Board member of: Smartsheet

Alissa Jay Abdullah is an American information security executive and academic. She is currently the Deputy Chief Security Officer at Mastercard, where she oversees enterprise security solutions efforts and safeguard the organisation's information assets. Alissa is also a member of Smartsheet Board of directors.

== Educational background ==
Alissa completed a Bachelor of Science in Mathematics at Savannah State University. She subsequently earned a master's degree in Telecommunications and Computer Networks from The George Washington University and a Ph.D. in Information Technology Management from Capella University.

== Career ==
Alissa began her professional career in government service as a cryptologic mathematician with the U.S. Department of Defense. Over time she moved into technical leadership roles in the private sector as deputy chief technology officer at Lockheed Martin. She also held senior role as associate vice president for enterprise solutions at Catapult Technology. Alissa took the role of chief information security officer at Stryker Corporation, where she was responsible for worldwide information security activities and for defining product-related security standards and governance.

From March 2012 to 2015, Alissa was the deputy chief information officer for the Executive Office of the 44th U.S. President of the United States. In that position she participated in efforts to modernise White House IT systems, including initiatives involving cloud services and virtualisation, and worked on cybersecurity planning for both current and anticipated technology developments. She later served as chief information security officer at Xerox, leading a corporate information-risk management programme that covered the enterprise.

In parallel with executive roles, Alissa has been active in academia. She served as an adjunct professor, delivering courses in statistics, algebra, information technology and leadership at higher-education institutions including the University of Maryland, American Public University, South University, University of Phoenix, American Sentinel University, Kaplan University and the College of Southern Maryland. Alissa hosts Cybercrime Magazine's Mastering Cyber and CISO 500 podcasts and also holds the position of Vice chairman within BITS, the technology policy division of the Bank Policy Institute (BPI). In 2021 she was appointed to Smartsheet's Board of directors.

=== Mastercard ===
Alissa joined Mastercard in 2019. As a deputy chief security officer she leads the Emerging Corporate Security Solutions organisation and is responsible for the protection of Mastercard's information assets as well as for advancing the company's security posture and future strategy (including work related to zero-trust approaches and other modern security frameworks).

== Recognition ==
Alissa have received industry recognition. In 2021 she was included among the “67 Powerful Black Women CEOs and Executives in Corporate America.” In 2024 she was featured in Women Know Cyber: 150 Fascinating Females Fighting Cybercrime and listed among the Top 30 Cybersecurity Influencers to Follow.
