= Victor Berlin =

American academic administrator

- Education: Northwestern University (Ph.D.); Cornell University (B.A.)
- Occupation: Educator
- Known for: Founder of the University of Fairfax

Victor Berlin is an American educator specializing in information security who has founded and led several accredited post secondary institutions, including the University of the Potomac and the University of Fairfax. He was president of the University of Fairfax until 2010.

== Education ==
Berlin earned his bachelor's degree from Cornell University, serving on the business board of Cornell's Daily Sun in 1966 and 1967. In 1975, he was awarded a PhD by Northwestern University's Robert R. McCormick School of Engineering and Applied Science. An article based upon Berlin's 1974 dissertation, "Organizational Structure and Effectiveness: An Administrative Experiment in an Urban Health Department," was published in the IEEE's Transactions on Engineering Management.

== Career ==
=== Early career ===
From 1973 to 1975, Berlin was an Assistant Professor of Management (Administrative Sciences) at Boston College's Carroll School of Management. He then served as Chief of Experimental Methods for the National Institute of Standards and Technology's, then known as the National Bureau of Standards, Experimental Technologies Incentives Program. In 1979, he became a vice president of General Communications, Inc. (GCI,) a Rockville, Maryland-based career college offering vocational training, serving in that capacity until 1991.

=== Potomac College ===
In 1991, Berlin left GCI and became president of Potomac College, now University of the Potomac, in Rockville, Maryland. The college was operated by the Potomac Education Foundation and offered working adults the opportunity to complete bachelor's degrees in management or microcomputer systems management while working full-time and completing projects on the job. In December 1994, Potomac College received accreditation. Potomac was acquired by private investors in 1995 and reorganized as a for-profit university headquartered in the District of Columbia. Prior to its accreditation, Maryland regulators had temporarily suspended college operations after alleging several violations of state standards at Potomac, including inadequate library, curriculum and faculty resources; poor recordkeeping; and admission of students who lacked the required two years of college education. The executive director of the Accrediting Council called Maryland's restrictions on Potomac "asinine," and characterized its actions as "more the result of a personal vendetta than any legitimate concerns for the institution."

=== Anteon International Corporation and Rockwell University ===
In 1996, Berlin headed the training division at Anteon International Corporation in Fairfax, Virginia, providing courses in Oracle, Java and e-commerce for technical professionals. In 2000 he persuaded Anteon executives to establish Rockwell University to offer master's degrees in e-commerce. Rockwell was approved to enroll students in November 2000, at a time when Anteon was preparing for a public offering. In June 2001, the university was acquired by Pinnacle Software Solutions, a technology training company. Berlin stayed on as president of Rockwell until December 2001.

=== University of Fairfax ===
In 2002, Berlin founded the University of Fairfax in Salem, Virginia, accredited by DEAC. which offers online instruction and issues graduate degrees (Master of Science, D.Sc. and DIA) and graduate certificates in Information Systems Security. In November 2007, Fairfax announced a collaboration with Jones International University's School of Business to offer a dual degree program leading to both a master's or doctoral degree from Fairfax and a Master of Business Administration in Information Security Management from Jones International. Berlin served as president of the university until 2010.
