= Bradford School =

Bradford School may refer to:

- Bradford School (Columbus)
- Bradford School (Pittsburgh)

== See also ==
- Bradford Grammar School, Bradford, England
