= TEFL Online =

Online teacher training certificate

TEFL Online is the online equivalent of a teacher training certificate in Teaching English as a Foreign Language (TEFL) in the field of English language learning and teaching.

Online TEFLs are usually regulated by governing bodies, such as Qualifi in the UK and AQC (from the DEAC) in the United States. There are three TEFL qualification level courses - no level, level 3 and level 5. A no level TEFL course does not give a certificate recognised by an awarding body. A level 3 course is 120 hours long and is considered the equivalent of a high school diploma. A level 5 course is 120+ hours long and is considered equivalent to a college diploma. Level 5 TEFL courses prepare the students for the best TEFL jobs across the globe so long as they obtain the required certification.

The TEFL Online certificate was designed by foreign language teachers in the Ontario Institute for Studies in Education (OISE) at the University of Toronto. The certificate is provided in partnership with Teach Away, an international teacher recruitment company.

== Course delivery format ==
The course is 100% online and both self-directed and self-paced. Students are required to complete all certificate requirements within a year of enrollment.
