= A. viridis =

A. viridis may refer to:

- Alnus viridis, the green alder, a tree species with a wide range across the cooler parts of the Northern Hemisphere
- Amaranthus viridis, the slender or green amaranth, a cosmopolitan plant species
- Aniba viridis, a plant species found in South America
- Artamella viridis, a bird species endemic to Madagascar
- Asclepias viridis, a plant species found in North America

== See also ==
- Viridis (disambiguation)
