= Westwood Online =

Westwood Online may refer to:

- Westwood College, a for-profit institution of higher learning in the United States owned by Alta Colleges Inc
- Westwood Studios, a computer and video game developer based in Las Vegas, Nevada, United States
