= PCDI =

PCDI may refer to:

- Ashworth College, formerly Professional Career Development Institute
- Communist Party of Italy (Partito Comunista d’Italia), a communist political party in Italy which existed 1921–26
- Communist Party of Italy (2014) (Partito Comunista d'Italia), a short-lived communist party in Italy 2014–16
- People's Commissariat of Defence Industry of the USSR, the central offices in the Soviet Union that oversaw production of the defense industry

== See also ==
- Democratic Party of Côte d'Ivoire – African Democratic Rally, (French: Parti Démocratique de la Côte d'Ivoire — Rassemblement Démocratique Africain, PDCI-RDA
