= Intercontinental University =

Intercontinental University may refer to:

- American InterContinental University (AIU), private for-profit university with its headquarters in Schaumburg, Illinois
- California InterContinental University (CIU) is a private for-profit online university based in Irvine, California
- Universidad Intercontinental (UIC), private Catholic University, located in Mexico City
- Intercontinental Correspondence University, private for-profit university in Washington, D.C., from 1904 to 1915
