= University of Fairfax =

Coordinates: 37°17′34″N 79°59′29″W

- Type: Private graduate-only university
- Industry: Higher Education
- Founded: 2002
- Founder: Potomac Educational Foundation
- Headquarters: Salem, Virginia,
- Number of locations: 3
- Area served: Worldwide
- Key people: President: Dr. Umesh C. Varma
- Services: Graduate degrees in Cybersecurity, Information Technology, and Business
- Owner: The University of Fairfax, Inc
- Website: ufairfax.edu

The University of Fairfax is an institution of higher education headquartered in Salem, Virginia. It offers online graduate degrees (Masters and Doctorates) in cybersecurity, cloud computing, computer science and engineering, and business as well as several graduate certificates. The entire program is provided via instructor-led conference calls and online instruction.

The Certification Training Center for Continuing Professional Education was established to support the continuing professional education needs of students and alumni. Through this center, the university provides support by co-sponsoring information security certification training and provides complimentary online tools to aid in preparing for the CISSP and CISM certification exams. Partnership with Cyber Security Forum Initiative in 2014 enabled professionals to receive graduate credit towards a Master of Science in Information Assurance or a doctoral degree in cybersecurity.

The University of Fairfax is accredited by the Distance Education Accrediting Commission (DEAC), an accrediting commission recognized by the United States Department of Education.

== History ==
The University of Fairfax was founded by the non-profit Potomac Education Foundation in 2002. The institution received approval from Virginia authorities in 2002 and started classes in 2003. Virginia regulations allow new institutions to operate for up to 10 years while seeking accreditation with an accreditor recognized by the U.S. Department of Education. Before attaining full accreditation in 2012, it had approval to operate from the State Council of Higher Education for Virginia as a non-accredited university.

Along with the Northern Virginia Technology Council and the Professional Services Council, the university cosponsored a conference on the shortage of cleared information security professionals in January 2003, highlighting the national need. This conference generated support for the university from employers including Accenture, Northrop Grumman, Ernst & Young, and SAIC.

The university enrolled its first cohort of graduate students from the Washington metropolitan area in July 2003 and initiated online instructional delivery via the eCollege platform in April 2004.

The first graduates of the University of Fairfax earned their Master of Science degrees in October 2004; the university awarded its first doctoral degrees in February 2007.

In November 2007 Fairfax announced that beginning in January 2008 it would collaborate with Jones International University's School of Business to offer a dual degree program leading to both a master's or doctoral degree from Fairfax and a Master of Business Administration in Information Security Management from Jones International.

Its first president was Dr. Victor Berlin, an educator who earlier had operated or established three other post-secondary educational institutions. The university was established to assure a supply of qualified information security personnel; consistent with that purpose, its motto is "Secure Your Future" (Latin: Munite Futurum). It operates as a non-profit entity. David Oxenhandler was elected President of the university in 2010. Frank E. Longaker became President of the University of Fairfax in 2013 and led the university alongside his presidential duties at American National University. In 2023, Dr. Umesh Varma was appointed the newest President of the University of Fairfax.

In 2010, the Distance Education Accrediting Commission (DEAC) listed the school as an applicant for accreditation and in January 2012, the DEAC approved it for full accreditation. DEAC reviewed the university in January 2021 and determined that the institution is in compliance with standards of accreditation and will remain accredited through 2025.
