= F. viridis =

F. viridis may refer to:

- Fragaria viridis, a strawberry species native to Europe and central Asia
- Frederickena viridis, the black-throated antshrike, a bird species found in Brazil, French Guiana, Guyana, Suriname and Venezuela

== See also ==
- Viridis (disambiguation)
