= James Madison High School online =

Coordinates: 33.97715°N 84.21196°W

Information
- Former name: Ashworth High School (2007–2011)
- Type: For-profit distance education private high school
- Established: 1996; 30 years ago
- CEO: Kermit Cook
- Grades: 9th – 12th
- Accreditation: Southern Association of Colleges and Schools; Distance Education Accrediting Commission
- Website: www.jmhs.com

James Madison High School (JMHS) is an English-medium online-only for-profit distance education private high school in the United States. It is regionally and nationally accredited. It provides the curriculum needed for students to complete one to four years of high school coursework online for a general or college prep high school diploma.

== History ==
The previous parent company of JMHS, Professional Career Development Institute (PCDI), was founded in 1987. The school was established in 1996 to aid students who need an alternative approach to a high school education. In 2007, all schools under PCDI merged under the Ashworth College umbrella and the name was changed to Ashworth High School. The name was changed back to James Madison High School in 2011.

Since then, Penn Foster Group acquired the Ashworth College portfolio, including JMHS.

== Accreditation ==
The school is regionally accredited by the Southern Association of Colleges and Schools Council on Accreditation and School Improvement (SACS CASI), an accreditation division of AdvancED. It is also accredited nationally by the Accrediting Commission of the Distance Education Accrediting Commission (DEAC). Both the DEAC and SACS are recognized by the Council for Higher Education Accreditation (CHEA).

== Academics ==
JMHS offers a General Diploma and College Prep Diploma track in 9th through 12th grades. All English and math courses are aligned to Common Core State Standards.

The United States Department of Defense (DoD) recognizes the school as a Tier I school, meaning graduates can enlist in the United States Armed Forces just as if they had graduated from a traditional brick and mortar high school.

Through the Move On When Ready (MOWR) program, in conjunction with University System of Georgia's eCore program, Georgia JMHS students in 10th through 12th grade can take college courses and earn college and high school credits simultaneously.

Diploma programs are non-synchronous; they can be started at any time. Students set their own schedule for completing coursework and a diploma program can be completed in as few as 18 months. Transfer credits may shorten completion time to as little as six months. The maximum amount of time allowed for students to finish their diploma program is six years. Students may request up to two six-month extensions within that time.

Students do not need to enroll in a complete diploma program; they can make up credits for single classes (credit recovery). They can take up to five individual courses without enrolling in a full diploma program. There is no minimum age requirement to take a single course.

The school serves five different types of students:

- Traditional students who want to earn their diplomas
- Adult learners (including refugees) who want to complete their high school education
- Homeschoolers who want to receive their diplomas online
- Athletes who wish to pursue a college degree and play sports at NCAA DI or DII schools
- Students at other high schools seeking credit recovery for individual courses
- Summer school students who need to make up classes or need more flexibility in their schedule

== Transfer credits ==
Students can transfer up to 75% of total program credits from other high schools. 25% of the courses must be completed at JMHS, or six credits must be completed to certain provisions set up by the school.

Students who were educated at home, in an environment other than a public/private school, or from a non-accredited school, can enroll upon an acceptable submission of a complete portfolio of their work and proper documentation.

== Online access ==
Students connect with their teachers and fellow students in an online student portal. Students also have access to school advisors, live orientation sessions, and educational videos, and can interact with student services online.

The student portal is broken down into three main areas:

- High School Guidance Center
- High School Library
- Writing Lab

== Admissions and financial aid and costs ==
Students must be over 14 years of age to enroll. Those under 18 must provide proof of promotion to 9th grade and be enrolled by a parent or guardian.

To be eligible for the college preparatory program track, a student's incoming GPA must be a minimum of 2.00 on a 4.00-point scale, or an overall C grade. If the transcript arrives after starting a program and the student is not eligible based on the overall GPA, then the student will be switched to the general program track.

If a homeschooled student, a student from an environment other than a public/private school or from a non-accredited school is not able to provide ample information in their portfolio, they must take a 9th grade entrance exam.

== Graduation ==
Each year, an average of 2,500 traditional-age students, adult learners, and homeschoolers graduate from JMHS.

Since 2007, the school has held a student graduation ceremony in Atlanta, Georgia. In order to graduate, students must meet requirements including completion of 23 credits, enrollment for more than six months, and all financial obligations paid in full.
