= Maestro University =

University in Utah

Coordinates: 33.37034°N 86.81486°W

- Former names: Andrew Jackson University (1994–2010); New Charter University (2010-2020); Bottega University (2020-2025)
- Type: For-profit
- Established: 1994
- Accreditation: DEAC
- Academic affiliations: ACE, ACT, CHEA, EDUCAUSE, NC-SARA
- President: Dr. Timothy Harrington
- Location: Salt Lake City, Utah
- Campus: Online
- Language: English

Maestro University, previously Bottega University, is a for-profit, accredited distance learning university headquartered in Salt Lake City, Utah, United States.

== Accreditation and institutional recognition ==
Maestro University is nationally accredited by the Distance Education Accrediting Commission (DEAC), an agency recognized by the U.S. Department of Education.

Maestro University is an institutional member of the Council for Higher Education Accreditation (CHEA), the American Council on Education (ACE), the Council for Adult & Experiential Learning (CAEL), and the American Association of Collegiate Registrars & Admissions Officers.

== History ==
In 1994, Andrew Jackson University (AJU) was launched in Birmingham, Alabama, with a focus on serving adult learners.

In 2012, the university received grant support from the Bill & Melinda Gates Foundation's Next Generation Learning Challenges and the William & Flora Hewlett Foundation to support research into alternative higher-education delivery models.

In January 2015, the university relocated to Salt Lake City, Utah, following its acquisition by Global Heritage Education and its parent organization.

In June 2020, with the approval of DEAC, Andrew Jackson University changed its name to Bottega University.

In December 2025, Bottega University changed its name again, transitioning to Maestro University.

== Academics ==
Maestro University offers associate's, bachelor's, and master's degree programs in business, communication, computer science, and technology. Specializations include entrepreneurship, finance, health care management, human resource management, marketing, and technology management.

=== Distance learning ===
From the time of its founding, the university has delivered all of its programs through distance learning, allowing students to learn remotely, without being physically present in a classroom. Its founders and subsequent leadership cited social justice factors including affordability, class mobility, and accessibility as being their primary motivators for this approach.

==== Virtual Learning Environment ====
In its earlier years, the university used a proprietary virtual learning environment (VLE) to deliver online courses, proctored assessments, and student information management.

Faculty associated with the university later published research examining challenges experienced in virtual learning environments in developing countries, highlighting factors such as limited connectivity, socioeconomic constraints, and teacher training barriers.

The university employed virtual proctoring tools developed by Donald Kassner, then president of Andrew Jackson University. After Kassner's technology was incorporated into UniversityNow and later spun out as Meazure Learning, the proctoring system was licensed to institutions such as Athabasca University, the Law School Admissions Council, McGraw-Hill Education, University of Iowa, University of Mississippi, University of Texas - Austin, and Western Governors University.

With the funding it received from the Bill and Melinda Gates Foundation and the Hewlett Foundation, UniversityNow undertook the development of its own competency-based learning management and student information systems. The LMS was featured in studies by Educause and awarded a grant by its Next Generation Learning Challenges program.

After agreeing to the acquisition of New Charter by Global Heritage and the Knod Foundation, UniversityNow sold the LMS to National University for an undisclosed sum.

=== Educational approach ===
In June 2012, the university redesigned its educational framework to incorporate competency-based learning.

During the mid-2010s, the university integrated project-based learning into parts of its curriculum in connection with programs launched through the Knod Foundation.

== Schools and affiliations ==
Maestro operates two schools, the School of Business and the School of Computer Science. The curricula of the School of Business focus on professional competency development for adult learners; Institutional Learning Outcomes are used to assess analytical abilities, business knowledge, collaboration and adaptability, critical thinking skills, communication aptitude, social responsibility, personal ethics, and quantitative acumen. The curricula in the School of Computer Science focus on technical competency in full-stack software development by emphasizing a project-based learning approach, including the delivery of capstones and the development of project portfolios.

The university maintains academic and corporate university partnerships, including articulation agreements and opportunities to transfer credits among affiliate institutions through its partnership with Sophia Learning:

- Alabama State University
- Colorado State University Global
- European School of Economics
- Istituto Marangoni
- Liberty University
- Purdue Global
- University of Arizona Global Campus
- University of Maryland Global Campus
- University of Massachusetts Global
- Upper Iowa University
- The Workshop School
- Waldorf University
- VASS University

Maestro University is recognized by United Nations Educational, Scientific and Cultural Organization (UNESCO) associate, the International Association of Universities (IAU). The IAU maintains UNESCO's World Higher Education Database (WHED), an authoritative record of accredited higher education institutions, higher education systems, and credentials in 196 countries and territories. Each institution in the WHED has a unique identifier, the Global WHED ID, which is IAU-029669 for Bottega University.

Maestro University's presence in the WHED validates its accreditation and recognition with the global higher education community.

The United Nations and the IAU lead two higher education sustainability programs, Higher Education and Research for Sustainable Development (HESD) and the Higher Education Sustainability Initiative (HESI), which focus on the critical role that higher education institutions play in achieving global sustainable development.

HESD monitors trends, develops expertise, and shares knowledge related to the UN's Sustainable Development Goals via peer-to-peer learning among higher education leaders globally, and it fosters whole-institution approaches at the leadership level to integrate sustainable development priorities.

The IAU collaborates with international and national entities, including being a key partner of the UNESCO Global Action Programme on Education for Sustainable Development.

HESI is an open partnership between several United Nations entities and the higher education community, which includes hundreds of university networks, student organizations, and higher education institutions.

The UN's stated mission for HESI is to enhance the role of higher education institutions in advancing sustainable development.

Maestro University was advanced as a recognized member of HESI because of its direct contributions to the United Nations Sustainable Development Goals.

The university's admissions, tuition, and academic models were designed for inclusive and equitable quality education and promote lifelong learning opportunities for all, which support Sustainable Development Goal 4.

Because the University is operated entirely online, requiring neither printed materials such as textbooks, nor in-person participation, which would require travel, shipments, construction, residency, and physical campus maintenance, it follows sustainable consumption and production patterns, addressing Sustainable Development Goal 12.

Maestro also advances United Nations Sustainable Development Goal 3, which focuses on ensuring healthy lives and promoting well-being for all at all ages, through its medical and scientific leadership series, the Congresses.

== Notable alumni ==
- Afaf Abdrabou Aly, MBE, Chair, Egyptian Society of Northern Ireland
- Dustin Burleson, M.D., Assistant Clinical Professor at Children's Mercy Hospital and Fellow at McLean Hospital
- J. Shane Hatcher, Chief of International Affairs, Security Cooperation & Foreign Disclosure Officer, United States Military Academy at West Point
- Jason Knapp, Chief of Staff, United States Army Joint Munitions Command
- Conrad Leigh, Chief Executive Officer, Networks, Rain Telecommunications South Africa
- Nicholas Mwendwa, President, Football Kenya Federation
- Sara Beysolow Nyanti, Foreign Minister of Liberia and Former United Nations Assistant Secretary General
- Jochen Schmidt, Deputy Chief of Party, World Vision and Chief Executive Officer, World Relief Deutschland
