= Lloyd Clayton Jr. =

American naturopath and wildlife conservationist

Lloyd E. Clayton Jr. was an American naturopath and wildlife conservationist who established three for profit educational institutions in Birmingham, Alabama. He died on January 14, 2019. The schools he founded are Clayton College of Natural Health, the American Institute of Computer Science (now part of American Sentinel University), and Chadwick University. He also owned Clayton Naturals, a business that sold herbal and homeopathic products. He was a champion of Southern Forests, who donated regularly to southern wildlife activist groups including Dogwood Alliance, Black Warrior Riverkeepers, Wildwood and the Sierra Club.

Clayton received a Doctor of Naturopathy degree in 1978. As a practitioner, his specialties were herbology and massage.

== Business history ==
In the late 1970s, Lloyd Clayton started an eco-friendly business to sell natural products for health; the business operated as Clayton Naturals. He started Clayton College of Natural Health in 1980 as the American College of Holistic Nutrition in 1980. It changed its name to Clayton College of Natural Health in 1997.

In 1988, he established the American Institute of Computer Science. In 2000, that institution was incorporated into American Sentinel University.

== Chadwick University ==
In 1989, Clayton started Chadwick University, a distance education institution offering programs in many fields. Chadwick had non-traditional educational standards, awarding academic credit for life experience. Chadwick was not accredited, but at different times it claimed accreditation from the International Association of Universities and Schools and the World Association of Universities and Colleges, neither of which are operational. Initially Chadwick also had no state license, due to a ruling that it could operate in Alabama without a license as long as it did not enroll state residents as students, but the institution obtained a state license in 1996. Chadwick's state license was renewed in 2005 and expired in January 2007. In February 2007 the Tuscaloosa News reported that the school's address was in a Birmingham building "labeled ... as the location of Magnolia Corporate Services", and "a call to a phone number listed for Chadwick went to voicemail for Magnolia Corporate Services". Chadwick ceased operation some time thereafter.

The state of Texas (among several other states) classifies this online college as an illegal supplier of educational credentials in the State of Texas and it is against state law to use Chadwick credentials. Thus degrees issued by Chadwick may not be acceptable to employers or institutions, and use of degree titles granted by Chadwick may be restricted or illegal in some jurisdictions.

== Clayton College of Natural Health ==
Clayton College of Natural Health, was also founded by Clayton (in 1980). The school was innovative in its online-approach, and awarded degrees to students of natural health care. The Clayton school refused to put a time limit cap on its online degree programs which led to accreditation controversy.

In July 2010, the college announced on its website that it was ceasing operations, blaming a number of factors but primarily the effects of the recent economic recession. In November 2010, a class action lawsuit was filed seeking recoveries on behalf of thousands of students who were enrolled in prepaid distance education programs at Clayton College. In November 2011 it was announced that as many as 14,000 former students of the defunct Clayton College of Natural Health will split up to $2.31 million in reimbursement for tuition, with part of the settlement to be paid for by Lloyd Clayton himself, with the remainder being paid for by RSUI Indemnity Co. Said funds will be placed in an escrow account for which former students can recover a portion of their lost tuition.

== See also ==
- List of unrecognized accreditation associations of higher learning
