= McKinley College =

Defunct college in the United States

- Type: Private for-profit online college
- Active: 2005; 21 years ago – 2020; 6 years ago
- Parent institution: Weston Distance Learning, Inc.
- President: Ann Rohr
- Location: Fort Collins, Colorado, United States
- Website: www.mckinleycollege.edu

McKinley College was a private for-profit online college with its headquarters in Fort Collins, Colorado. The college was founded in 2005 and was owned and operated by Weston Distance Learning, Inc. The college ceased operation on August 20, 2020.

== Accreditation ==
McKinley College was accredited by the Distance Education Accrediting Commission (DEAC).
