= TechMission =

Christian non-profit organization

- Founded: 2000
- Founder: Andrew Sears
- Tax ID no.: 68-0492427
- Location: Kansas City, Missouri, United States
- Region served: World-wide
- Method: Online Degree, Community development
- Subsidiaries: City Vision University
- Revenue: $1,529,349
- Employees: 12
- Website: www.cityvision.edu

TechMission is a Christian non-profit organization focused on online education. Its current focus is training nonprofit leaders in ministry management and addiction counseling through its accredited online college, City Vision University.

== History and former programs ==
TechMission was founded in 2000 as an extension of the ministry of the PREP Computer Center, a Dorchester-based computer center run as a partnership between Bruce Wall Ministries and two local churches. Andrew Sears, who was then executive director of PREP, and other leaders of Christian community computer centers created TechMission's AC4 program (the Association of Christian Community Computer Centers) to connect and provide resources to similar computer centers. At its peak, it served over 500 centers, including ones affiliated with the Salvation Army, Christian Community Development Association, and the Association of Gospel Rescue Missions.

TechMission became a separate non-profit entity in 2002. Over the next several years it developed the TechMission Corps internships program to provide full-time workers to serve in after-school, teen, and adult technology education programs, as well as providing the curriculum and software benefits of AC4 membership. It sent out interns to organizations in Boston, Los Angeles, Denver, Chicago, and Western Massachusetts. For several years it received AmeriCorps funding. Later, it was associated with TechMission's online university, City Vision University.

In 2005, TechMission started its Safe Families Program, which promotes online safety through providing free training and web-filtering software. The TechMission Volunteer Network (ChristianVolunteering.org) was launched the following year. In 2007, TechMission launched UrbanMinistry.org, which used Web 2.0 technologies, such as user-submitted content to further promote collaboration and resource-sharing between Christian community development ministries.

== City Vision University ==
Seal of City Vision University

City Vision University is a private online Christian university headquartered in Kansas City, Missouri, founded in 1998. Its degree programs equip urban ministry workers and nonprofit social service leaders to manage and develop their ministries.

City Vision University is now the primary program offered by TechMission, and TechMission operates under the name of City Vision University. c The university was originally founded by the Association of Gospel Rescue Missions (now called "Citygate Network") as Rescue College, with one degree in Urban Missions. It was accredited by the Distance Education Accrediting Commission in 2005. When TechMission acquired it in 2008, it was renamed it City Vision College to serve a broader audience of social service organizations. It was later renamed City Vision University when it began offering Master's programs.

Since 2005, City Vision has launched programs in Addiction Counseling, Business, and Christian Ministry, including an MBA, and begun an internship/scholarship program by partnering with North American urban ministries.

== Media coverage and case study ==
In 2013, TechMission/City Vision and its founder, Andrew Sears, were covered by a Christianity Today article titled "The Tech Poverty Fighter". TechMission was also covered in Religion Today for its involvement in responding to the Boston Marathon Bombing. TechMission was also featured in a nonprofit case study by a group of Northeastern University professors published in the Case Research Journal.

Andrew Sears was invited by the Clayton Christensen Institute to write on a standards strategy for stackable global credentials. Finally, in 2018, City Vision University was granted special recognition in the Pioneer Institute's Better Government Competition as an "affordable educational option that offers degrees in Addiction Studies, Non-profit Management, Business, and Urban Missions for low-income individuals who want to help their own impoverished communities."
