= American College of Healthcare Sciences =

Online college in Oregon, US

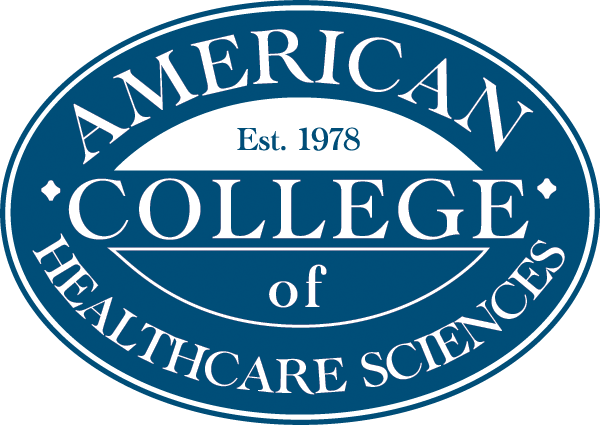
- Former names: Australasian College of Herbal Studies, Australasian College of Health Sciences
- Type: Private for-profit online college
- Established: 1978; 48 years ago
- President: Tracey Abell
- Faculty: 55
- Students: 741
- Undergraduates: 470
- Location: Portland, Oregon, United States; 45°29′13.0″N 122°40′33.4″W
- Colors: Blue and gold
- Website: www.achs.edu

The American College of Healthcare Sciences (ACHS) is a private for-profit online college headquartered in Portland, Oregon, that specializes in holistic health education. It was founded in 1978.

== History ==
ACHS began in 1976 as the extramural or distance education department of an on-campus naturopathic college in Auckland, New Zealand. In 1998, ACHS became state licensed by the Oregon Department of Education. The Oregon Department of Education noted that it was the first state-licensed college in the U.S. offering distance education programs in holistic medicine.

ACHS became accredited by the Distance Education Accrediting Commission in 2003 and changed its name from the Australasian College of Herbal Studies to the Australasian College of Health Sciences.

In May 2009, ACHS changed its name to the American College of Healthcare Sciences.

In September 2016 ACHS became a Certified B Corporation.

== Academics ==
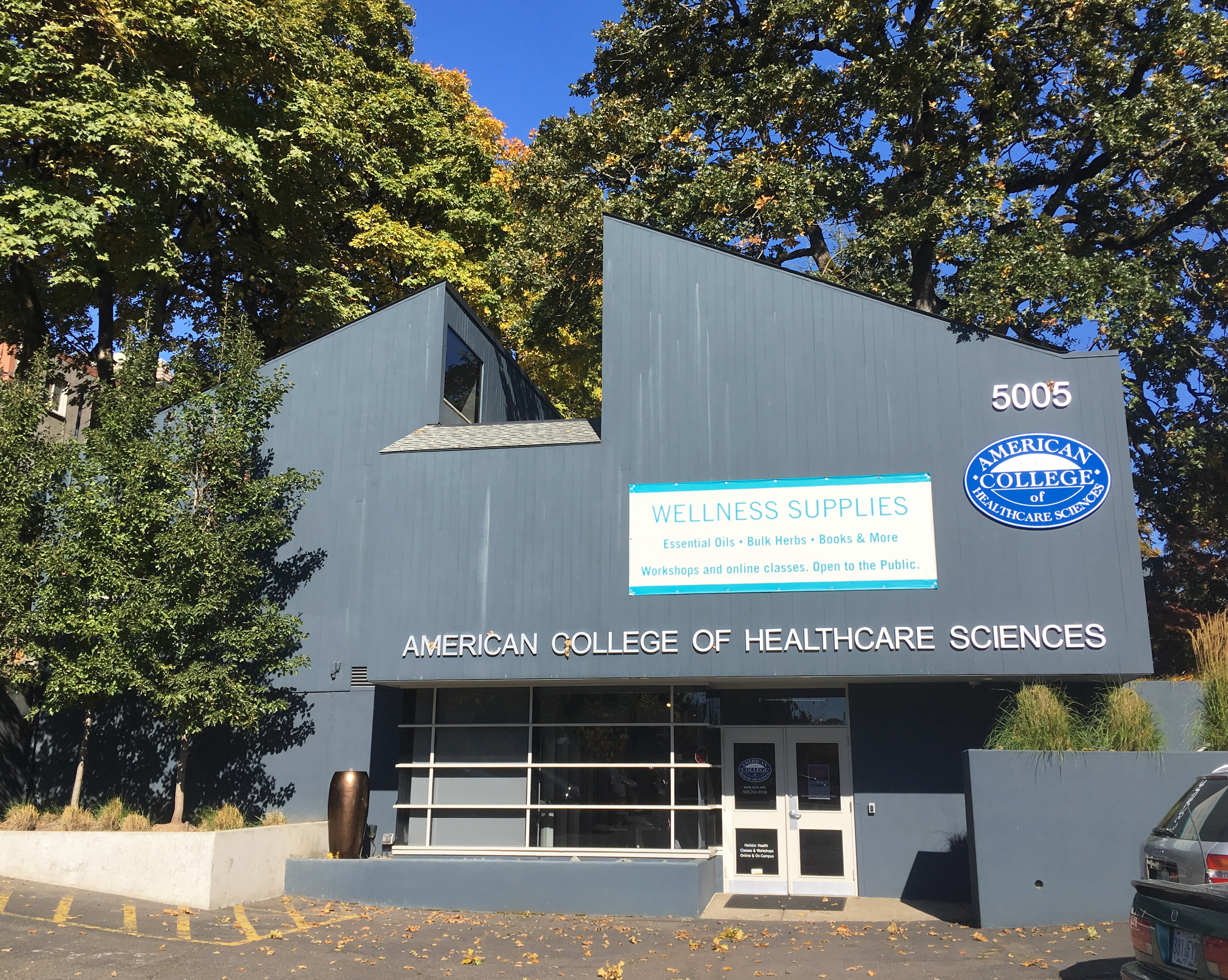
College's main campus building in Portland, Oregon

The American College of Healthcare Sciences offers certificate programs, an Associate of Applied Science degrees, Master of Science degrees, and continuing education courses, webinars, community wellness workshops, and study-abroad programs.

ACHS is accredited by the Distance Education Accrediting Commission (DEAC), which is recognized by both the U.S. Department of Education and the Council for Higher Education Accreditation (CHEA) as an accrediting body.

== Campus ==
The college only offers online courses, and Its administrative building is located in Portland, Oregon.

== Sustainability ==
Since September 2008, ACHS has participated in PGE's Save More, Matter More campaign by using renewable power from clean wind to save energy, reduce costs, and reduce the impact on the environment.

In 2009 ACHS was approved by Green America's Green Business Network. Green America

In December 2010, the ACHS Apothecary Shoppe became Oregon Tilth Certified Organic (OTCO). OTCO is the certifying agent for the National Organic Program (NOP) of the United States Department of Agriculture (USDA).

In June 2013, ACHS and the Apothecary Shoppe was re-certified as a Green America Gold Certified Business.

In June 2016, ACHS was named #6 of out of 100 Best Green Workplaces by Oregon Business magazine. It was named #2 in 2017, #5 in 2018, and #3 in 2019.
