= Southwest University (Louisiana) =

Private for-profit university

Coordinates: 30.0070°N 90.2378°W

- Type: Private, for-profit
- Established: 1982
- Accreditation: Distance Education Accrediting Commission (until 2019)
- Location: Kenner, Louisiana, United States
- Campus: Online / Distance education

Southwest University (SWU) is a private for-profit university located in Kenner, Louisiana. Founded in 1982, the university offered associate degrees, bachelor's degrees, master's degrees, and certificate programs.

== Academics ==
Southwest University offers associate degrees in business administration, criminal justice and general studies; bachelor's degrees in business administration, criminal justice, human resource management, international business, leadership and management, management, marketing, organizational management; master's degrees in business administration, criminal justice and organizational management and it has certificate programs. In the 1980s it offered additional degree programs; BA/MA/Doctor in Psychology, BA/MA/Doctor Counselling/Hypnotherapy, BA/MA/Doctor Counselling Psychology, Doctor of Philosophy in Counseling Psychology, BA/MA/Doctor of Science in Holistic Health Sciences, BS/MS/Doctor in Business Administration, BA/MA/Doctor of Arts in Hospital Administration, BA/MA/Doctor in Criminal Justice and BA/MA/Doctor in Security Administrations. Distance study (non-residential) requirements included assigned study courses, self-developed curriculum plan, research projects and a thesis/dissertation. Additional credit could be obtained by transfer credit, prior learning/experiential learning and military service courses. These degrees were first recognized by the State of Louisiana then the DEAC, CHEA and finally the US department of Education. Theses were registered with the Library of Congress. The University offered an online store for merchandise.

== History ==
Southwest University was founded in 1982.

On August 29, 2005, the offices of the university were completely crushed by Hurricane Katrina. The university facilitated understudies from substitute offices for over two years while the offices were reconstructed.

== Accreditation ==
Southwest University was first registered with Louisiana Board of Regents in 1983 and was accredited by the Distance Education Accrediting Commission and the Council for Higher Education Accreditation until March 2019. All degrees from Southwest University are recognized by the US Department of Education.
