= UEI College =

American for-profit technical career college

Coordinates: 36.988279°N 121.985295°W

United Education Institute ( UEI ) or UEI College
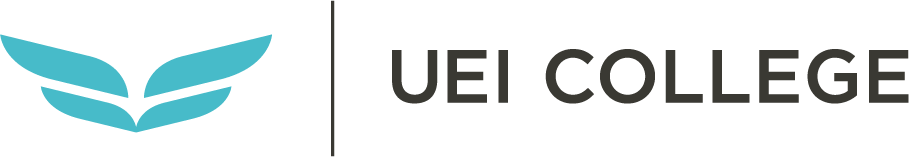
- Type: Private for-profit career college
- Established: 1982
- Location: Bakersfield, Ca; Chula Vista, Ca; Gardena, Ca; Garden Grove, Ca; Reseda, Ca; Fresno, Ca; Huntington Park, Ca; Ontario, Ca; Riverside, Ca; Sacramento, Ca; Oceanside, Ca; Stockton, Ca; West Covina, Ca; Phoenix, Az; Mesa, Az; Las Vegas, Nv; Stone Mountain, Ga; Morrow, Ga; Dallas, Tx; Houston, Tx; Albuquerque, Nm; Tacoma, Wa;, California, Arizona, Nevada, Georgia, Texas, New Mexico, Washington, United States
- Website: uei.edu

UEI College is a private for-profit career college with locations in the U.S. states of California, Washington, Arizona, Nevada, Texas, New Mexico, and Georgia. It specializes in short-term technical and vocational education to prepare students for entry-level positions in industries such as healthcare, business, and skilled trades. UEI College is owned by International Education Corporation. The school was founded in 1982 as United Education Institute and changed its name to UEI College in 2009.

== Accreditation ==
UEI Colleges in Huntington Park, Garden Grove, Chula Vista, West Covina, Reseda, Ontario, Oceanside, Stockton, Phoenix, and Morrow are accredited by Accrediting Council for Continuing Education and Training (ACCET). The Bakersfield, Gardena, Fresno, Sacramento, Riverside and Las Vegas locations are accredited by the Accrediting Commission of Career Schools and Colleges (ACCSC).
