= Alta College, Inc. =

Alta Colleges, Inc., was a Denver-based company that operated three for-profit schools: Westwood College, Westwood College Online, and Redstone College.

== History ==
The college was established in 1953 as Radio and Television Repair Institute and was renamed the Denver Institute of Technology in 1974. Kirk Riedinger and Jamie Turner acquired the institute in 1987 and subsequently expanded its technical course offerings. Its first campus outside the Denver area opened in Los Angeles in 1999.

At its largest, Westwood College operated 17 campuses across California, Colorado, Georgia, Illinois, Texas and Virginia, in addition to an online division. It offered 27 degree programs in fields including business, design, technology, industrial services, justice and health care. More than 20,000 students graduated from Westwood College. "Over 75 percent of adult Americans don't have bachelor's degrees," Alta College co-founder Kirk Riedinger told the Denver Business Journal in June 2002. "We offer career-focused education to prepare students who are launching a career, changing a career or enhancing a career. Our curriculum is constantly updated based on the industry and the feedback we receive."

== Legal issues ==
On April 20, 2009, the United States Department of Justice announced that Alta Colleges had agreed to pay the U.S. government $7 million to resolve allegations under the False Claims Act that Alta's Texas schools submitted false claims for federal student aid funds. The college admitted no wrongdoing and was not required to change any of its practices.

In January 2012 the Illinois attorney general's office announced it would sue Westwood College for misleading students. The suit was settled in 2015.
