= Clayton College of Natural Health =

Non-accredited college in Birmingham, Alabama, US (1980–2010)

- Type: Private, distance education
- Active: 1980–2010
- President: Lloyd E. Clayton Jr.
- Location: Birmingham, Alabama, United States

The Clayton College of Natural Health was a non-accredited American distance-learning college based in Birmingham, Alabama, offering classes in various forms of alternative medicine. The school was founded in 1980 by Lloyd Clayton Jr. as the American College of Holistic Nutrition. According to its website, the school at one point had more than 25,000 students and graduates. The school and some of its more notable graduates have been the subject of controversy.

== History and accreditation ==
The American College of Holistic Nutrition was founded in 1980 by Lloyd Clayton Jr. In 1997, its name was changed to Clayton College of Natural Health.

Clayton College of Natural Health never held educational accreditation from any agency recognized by the U.S. Department of Education or the Council for Higher Education Accreditation. Several state education agencies specifically list Clayton as unaccredited, among them Oregon, Texas, and Maine.

=== Closure and lawsuit ===
In July 2010, the college announced on its website that it was ceasing operations, blaming a number of factors but primarily the effects of the contemporary economic recession. In November 2010, a class action lawsuit was filed seeking recoveries on behalf of thousands of students who were enrolled in prepaid distance education programs at Clayton College. The lawsuit claims Clayton breached its fiduciary duty, was negligent, among other claims, and seeks compensation for the tuition amounts paid for programs that are no longer available. They are also seeking compensation for Plaintiffs’ "loss of time and opportunity", among other damages.

In November 2011, it was announced that as many as 14,000 former students of the defunct Clayton College of Natural Health would split up to $2.31 million in reimbursement for tuition, with part of the settlement to be paid by Lloyd Clayton Jr. and the remainder being paid for by RSUI Indemnity Co. The funds were to be placed in an escrow account for which former students could recover a portion of their lost tuition.

== Programs ==
Clayton offered five degree programs and seven certificate programs. The degree programs included Bachelors and Masters of Science in Natural Health, Bachelor and Masters of Science in Holistic Nutrition, Doctor of Education in Holistic Health and Wellness, and Doctor of Naturopathy. Certificates were offered in Iridology, Herbalism, Companion Animal Studies, Practitioner Education Studies, and Natural Wellness Studies. No clinical training was provided.

== Notable alumni ==
Well-known graduates include convicted felon Tina Peters, television nutrition personality Gillian McKeith, naturopath Hulda Regehr Clark, author Robert O. Young, philanthropist and Anaheim Ducks co-owner Susan Samueli, nutritionist and author Lyn-Genet Recitas, and author Kim Barnouin, co-author of the diet book, Skinny Bitch. McKeith's credentials from Clayton have been the focus of comment in The Guardian's "Bad Science" column, specifically the institution's unaccredited status and the institution's refusal to make McKeith's doctoral dissertation available for outside review.
