= NationsUniversity =

Private university in New Orleans, Louisiana, US

- Established: 1996
- Religious affiliation: Nondenominational Christian
- Chancellor: Mac Lynn
- President: John Baxter (CEO) Alan D. Cooper
- Administrative staff: 7
- Students: approx. 1,500
- Location: New Orleans, Louisiana, United States
- Campus: Online
- Colors: Gold and blue
- Website: nationsu.edu

NationsUniversity, also known as Nations University or NationsU, is a private, denominational Christian university in New Orleans, Louisiana. It only offers online distance education, focusing on "the development of faith and the training of Christian leaders around the world." NationsU offers certificates, bachelor's in religious studies, and a master's degree in theological studies, and a Master of Divinity (M.Div.) degree.

== History ==
NationsU was incorporated in 1996 by Richard Ady, Mac Lynn, and Darrell Frazier. Ady and Lynn had been college classmates. Ady's career had been in church work and Lynn had worked in higher education as a teacher and administrator. Ady had previously founded the World English Institute. Gathering volunteers who would travel around the globe, conducting courses and seminars in religious studies, was the plan. As time progressed, around two hundred volunteers were enlisted to provide assistance. As the group's activity strengthened, the demand for religious degree programs strengthened. Therefore, the organization became officially incorporated in Louisiana on July 19, 1996, as NationsUniversity.

== Academics ==
NationsU offers three different degree programs and three certificate programs. These programs include:

- Certificate of Biblical Studies
- Certificate in Christian Ministry
- Graduate Certificate in Biblical Studies·
- Bachelor of Religious Studies
- Master of Theological Studies
- Master of Divinity

In 2011 the student announced that it has served 5,000 student to date with its programs. As of December 1, 2019, active enrollment stood at 1482 students in 100 countries and 40 states within the U.S. Of the total enrollment, 328 were formally admitted into the Certificate in Biblical Studies, 228 to the Bachelor of Religious Studies, 80 to the Master of Theological Studies, and 47 to the Master of Divinity. The remainder were as yet not formally admitted to a specific program of study and as of December 31, 2018, 1,369 degrees have been awarded since the founding in 1996.

=== Accreditation and Affiliations ===
The institution is accredited by The Distance Education Accrediting Commission (DEAC).

Since 2019, the institution has been a member of the Evangelical Council for Financial Accountability.
