= Lyn-Genet Recitas =

American author (born 1965)

- Born: March 26, 1965 (age 61); New Haven, Connecticut, US
- Education: Clayton College of Natural Health
- Occupations: Nutritionist, author
- Years active: 1985–present
- Spouse: William Gillett
- Website: lyngenet.com

Lyn-Genet Recitas, (born March 26, 1965), also known as Lyn-Genet, is an American author and self-proclaimed nutritionist.

== Career ==
Lyn-Genet received her undergraduate and master's degrees from the non-accredited Clayton College of Natural Health.

She started her practice on the west coast of the US and has been running health centers in New York City and Westchester, New York. Lyn-Genet has staff in the US and Canada and sees clients in Hastings on Hudson, New York and Houston, Texas.

== Books ==
- Recitas, Lyn-Genet (January 1, 2013). The Plan (First ed.). New York, NY: Grand Central Publishing. p. 301. ISBN 978-1-4555-1548-6.
- Recitas, Lyn-Genet (December 30, 2014). The Plan Cookbook (First ed.). New York, NY: Grand Central Publishing. p. 213. ISBN 978-1-4555-5653-3.
