= Sophia.org =

Educational website

Sophia
- Industry: E-learning
- Founder: Don Smithmier
- Headquarters: Minnesota, Minneapolis
- Website: sophia.org

Sophia.org is a website with free educational tutorials, certification programs for teachers, and low-cost online college credit courses.

== History ==
Sophia founded by Don Smithmier, launched as a public beta in March 2011. As of 2013, the company reported that its platform was utilized by over 70,000 students and educators.

Sophia offers more than 34,000 free tutorials, created by teachers and scholars, including Bill Nye The Science Guy, and institutions such as Mayo Clinic.

In September 2012, SOPHIA introduced SOPHIA Pathways for College Credit (SPCC), a series of nine online college-level courses eligible for college credit through the American Council on Education’s College Credit Recommendation Service, with accreditation from the Distance Education Accreditation Commission (DEAC) under Approved Quality Curriculum (AQC) status.

== Educator resources ==
Sophia offers developmental resources for teachers and conducts surveys on various educational topics.
