= Anthem Education Group =

American education organization

Anthem Education Group (formerly The Chubb Institute) was a Florida-based organization that operated a chain of for-profit, technical schools in the United States, called Florida Career College. In 2018, their website listed 11 campuses, ten in Florida and one in Houston, Texas. Anthem was accredited by Accrediting Council for Independent Colleges and Schools (ACICS). International Education Corporation (IEC) now holds all Anthem Education Group liabilities

== History ==
The organization was founded in 1970 (56 years ago) as The Chubb Institute, the employee training arm of the Chubb Corporation, an insurance company. Its initial focus was on computer-related training, and training in medical fields was added later.

Facing lawsuits and financial losses, Chubb Corporation put the school for sale in 2004 and eventually sold it for $1 to a partnership of private equity firms called Great Hill Partners and the High-Tech Institute, a network of similar technical schools based in Phoenix, Arizona. Chubb Corporation recognized a $31 million loss from the sale.

The organization lost $9 million in 2005. The location in Chicago was renamed to Banner Institute in January 2006, and the location in Arlington, Virginia was renamed Banner College. However, as of 2007, The Washington Post'' reported that the chain was still struggling with lawsuits and challenges to accreditation. Banner College in Virginia closed in August 2008 after ten years of operation.

By 2010, the colleges were being operated by the Anthem Education Group, a company owned by Great Hills Partners. At that time, the group was based in Phoenix and operated 23 accredited colleges.

In 2012, the company was acquired by Education Training Corporation in Florida. The merger expanded the educational areas offered by AEG. As of November 2013, the group operated 8 brands, including Anthem College, Anthem College – Bryman School, Anthem Career College, Florida Career College, FCC Anthem College, Anthem College Online, Anthem Institute, and Morrison University.

In 2013, the company operated 34 campuses in various states and one online institution before closing most of its campuses.

In August 2014, Anthem Education Group filed for bankruptcy and closed abruptly in several states. 14 of Anthem's campuses were sold to (IEC) before the bankruptcy filing. 150 staff members were laid-off due to the closure, although plans were for IEC to re-hire many of former Anthem employees.

In 2016, Anthem's accreditor, ACICS, lost its authority, until it was temporarily restored in 2018.
