= Sessions College =

Online college based in Tempe, Arizona

Coordinates: 33.426669°N 111.940271°W

- Former names: Sessions.edu; Sessions Online Schools of Art and Design
- Type: Private for-profit online college
- Established: 1997; 29 years ago
- Accreditation: DEAC
- President: Gordon Drummond
- Students: 1,500
- Location: Tempe, Arizona, United States
- Campus: Online-only
- Colors: Blue, Black, White
- Nickname: Sessions
- Website: www.sessions.edu

Sessions College is a private for-profit online college in Tempe, Arizona. It offers bachelor degrees, associate degrees, undergraduate certificates, and vocational certificates. It is accredited by the Distance Education Accrediting Commission (DEAC) and accredited at the certificate program level by Middle States Commission on Secondary Schools.

== History ==
Sessions was originally founded as a start-up company in 1997, where it operated out of New York City before relocating in 2009 to Tempe, Arizona, when it expanded from a certificate-only institution to an accredited, associate degree-granting college. Sessions College now enrolls approximately 417 students in bachelor degree, associate degree and certificate programs in subjects including graphic design, web design, digital media, illustration, advertising design, digital photography, and fine arts. In 2017, Sessions was included on Graphic Design USA's list of Top Graphic Design Schools.

== Academics ==
The college is run by President Gordon Drummond and CEO Zane Vella. Outside of Sessions College, Drummond serves on the board of the Distance Education Accreditation Commission. Until 2015, he was also a board member of the Middle States Association Commission on Secondary Schools.

Sessions College's 2019 student-to-faculty ratio is 8:1. The faculty is composed of working professionals in the art and design industries. Faculty use an asynchronous, project-based learning model to deliver regular, online instruction, critiques, discussions, and weekly assignments. For a number of courses, students can choose between a structured, scheduled course and a self-paced option. Throughout their courses, students receive consistent individualized feedback on their work from professors, as well as feedback from peers.

== Accreditation and memberships ==
For its degree programs, Sessions College is accredited by the Distance Education Accrediting Commission. At the certificate level, it is accredited by the Middle States Commission on Secondary Schools. It is also licensed by Arizona State Board for Private Postsecondary Education.

== Admission ==
Sessions College's undergraduate and vocational certificates operate on an open admissions policy; any student with a high school diploma or a GED may enroll. To apply for a bachelor or associate degree, students must submit transcripts, work samples, a written essay, and TOEFL scores for students for whom English is a second language. Students may begin their studies at the start of any of the school's three semesters.
