= Redstone College =

Defunct for-profit educational institution

Coordinates: 39°54′53.3″N 105°7′8.8″W

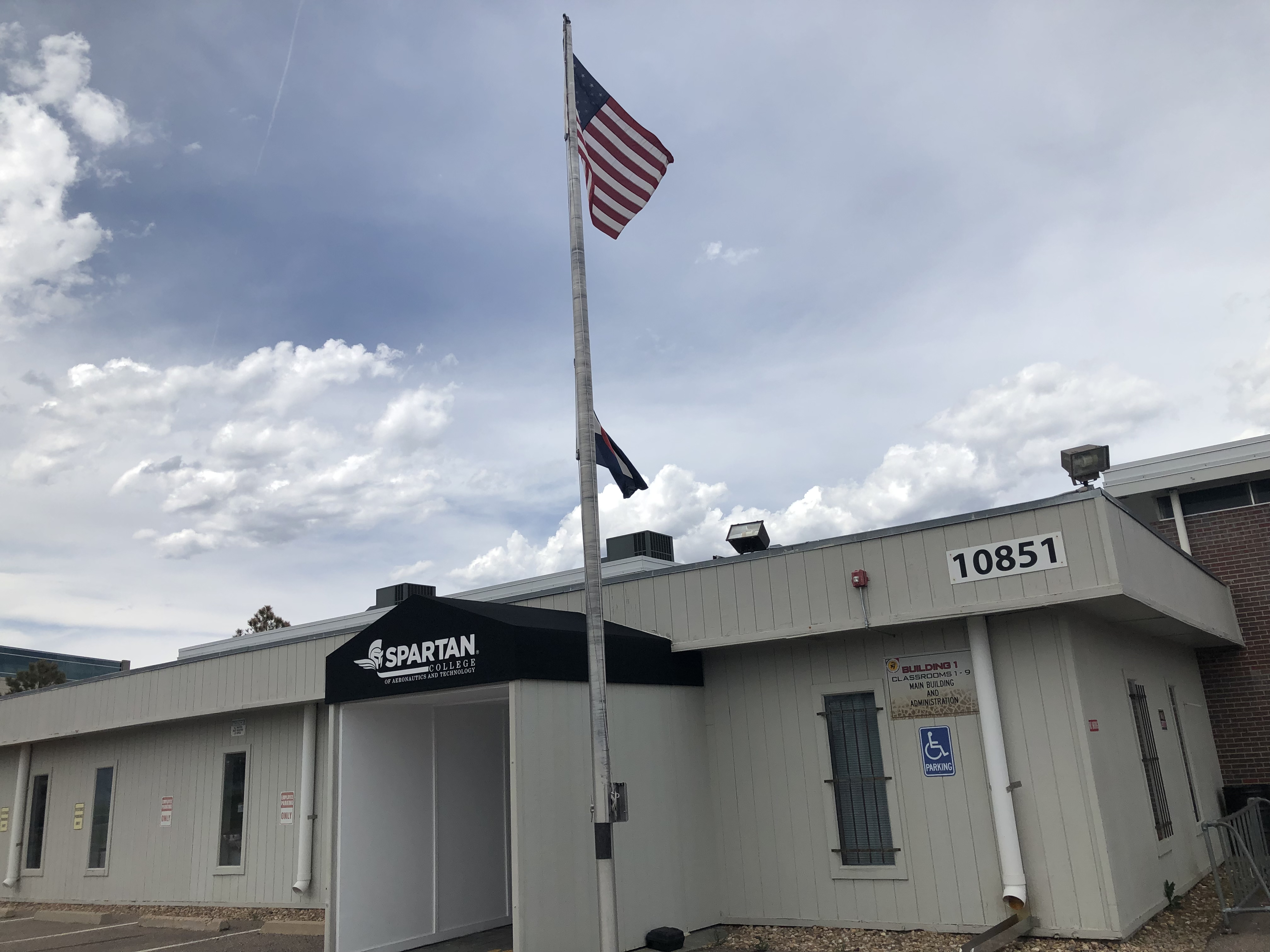
- Type: Private, For-profit
- Location: Broomfield, Westminster, Colorado, United States

Redstone College was an American for-profit institution of higher learning owned by Alta Colleges Inc. that had two campus locations in Colorado, one in Broomfield, and the other in Westminster, and a third location in Inglewood, California.

Redstone had been accredited by the Accrediting Council for Independent Colleges and Schools (ACICS). Like Westwood College, also owned by Alta Colleges, Redstone was subject to federal and state lawsuits and a class action by students. ACICS accreditation privileges were revoked by the US Department of Education in 2016 and shut down.

Spartan Education Group purchased the Broomfield campus of Redstone College in April, 2016. It is now a campus of the Spartan College of Aeronautics and Technology.
