= Aspen University =

US for-profit online university

- Type: Private for-profit online university
- Established: 1987
- Budget: $67.0 million
- President: Cheri St. Arnauld
- Students: 3,511 (fall 2024)
- Location: Phoenix, Arizona, United States
- Website: www.aspen.edu

Aspen Group, Inc.
- Traded as: Nasdaq: ASPU

Aspen University is a private for-profit online university with its headquarters in Phoenix, Arizona. It was established in 1987. Aspen University offers undergraduate and graduate degrees.

The university is owned by the Aspen Group, Inc. a publicly held, for-profit postsecondary education company headquartered in New York City. It owns two accredited universities, Aspen University and United States University. Aspen Group, Inc. is publicly traded over the counter under the symbol ASPU. In 2023, ASPU voluntarily delisted from the New York Stock Exchange.

== History ==
The university was founded during the 1960s as the International Academy. In 1987, the International Academy established the Information Institute and changed the school's name to the International School of Information Management (ISIM), focusing on emerging information technologies. In 2003, ISIM changed its name to Aspen University. Patrick Spada was the founder of Aspen University and Served as its chairman and CEO until 2011. David Lady was the school President under Spada between 2008 and 2011.

Effective March 12, 2014, Aspen University's RN to BSN Program received CCNE accreditation.

In 2021, Aspen University in Arizona had nursing exam pass rates that were below the state standards. In 2022, students filed a class action suit, claiming the school had violated Arizona's Consumer Fraud Act.

In 2022, Aspen University suspended new enrollments to its pre-licensure nursing programs in Florida, Georgia, Tennessee and Texas.

== Accreditation ==
Aspen University is accredited by the Distance Education Accrediting Commission (DEAC).

The baccalaureate and master's degree in nursing at Aspen University is accredited by the Commission on Collegiate Nursing Education (http://www.aacn.nche.edu/ccne-accreditation).

Aspen University has been reviewed and approved as a provider of project management training by the Project Management Institute (PMI).

Aspen University's Bachelor's & Master's degrees in Psychology of Addiction and Counseling are approved by the National Association for Alcoholism and Drug Abuse Counselors (NAADAC).

The Colorado Commission on Higher Education (CCHE) has authorized Aspen University to operate in Colorado as a private university under the Degree Authorization Act.

== Faculty ==
Aspen University has 34 full-time instructors and 345 part-time instructors for 9,563 students.
