= Crestmont University =

American online university

Coordinates: 33.6965°N 117.8510°W

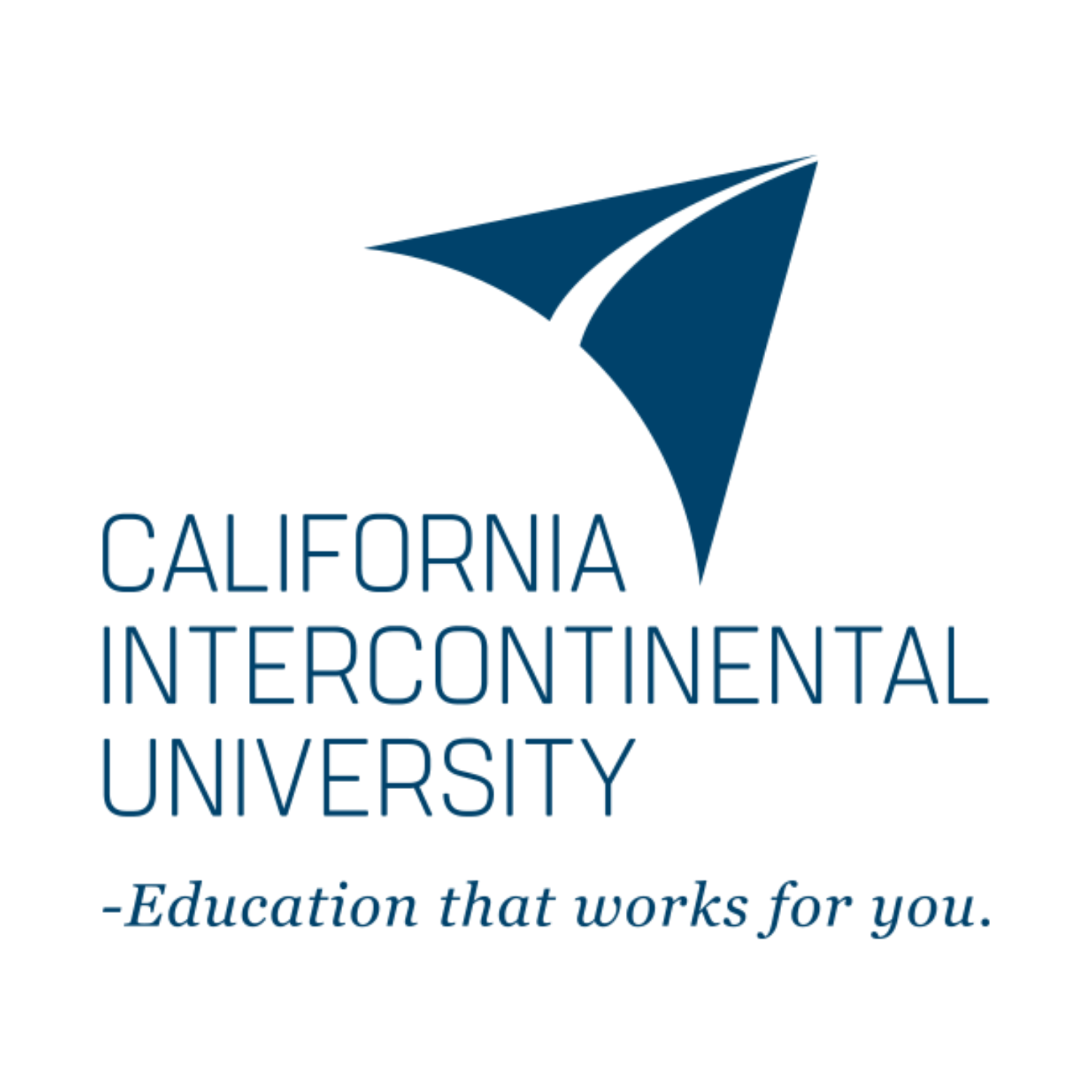
- Former names: Cal University, California InterContinental University (CIU)
- Motto: "Education that works for you."
- Type: Private for-profit online university
- Established: 1996; 30 years ago
- Founder: Shaan Kumar
- President: Richard Madrigal
- Location: Sioux Falls, South Dakota, United States
- Campus: Urban
- Colors: Gold and Blue
- Website: crestmontuniversity.edu

Crestmont University, formerly California InterContinental University, is a private for-profit online university headquartered in Sioux Falls, South Dakota, United States. Founded in 1996, the university offers online associate, bachelor's, master's, and doctoral degree programs.

== Academics ==
Crestmont University offers students associate, bachelor's, master's, and doctoral online programs in business administration, engineering information technology, science, and arts.

The university was first approved to operate as a degree-granting university in 2003 in California by the California Bureau for Private Postsecondary Education (BPPE). It became accredited by the Accrediting Commission of the Distance Education Accrediting Commission in January 2009. Additionally, Crestmont was granted programmatic accreditation by the Accreditation Council for Business Schools and Programs (ACBSP) in 2024.

== See also ==
- List of for-profit universities and colleges
- List of American online colleges
