= U.S. Career Institute =

Educational institution based in Fort Collins, Colorado

- Training adults for new careers
- Motto: Dream • Learn • Succeed
- Type: Private online college
- Established: 1981; 45 years ago
- Location: Fort Collins, Colorado, United States
- Website: www.uscareerinstitute.edu

U.S. Career Institute (USCI) is a private online college based in Fort Collins, Colorado. It offers self-paced certificate and associate degree programs. U.S. Career Institute is owned and operated by Weston Distance Learning, Inc., which was founded in 1981.

== Accreditation ==
U.S. Career Institute is nationally accredited by the Distance Education Accreditation Commission (DEAC).
