= Viridis =

Viridis may refer to:

- 8774 Viridis, a Main Belt asteroid
- Viridis Graduate Institute, a distance learning institute focusing on ecological psychology
- Viridis Visconti (1352–1414), an Italian noblewoman, a daughter of Bernabò Visconti and his wife Beatrice Regina della Scala
