= Viridis Graduate Institute =

Accredited, non-profit distance learning institute

Coordinates: 33.3915°N 111.9263°W

- Established: 2011; 15 years ago
- Founders: Dr. Lori Pye
- Accreditation: Distance Education Accrediting Commission
- Website: viridis.edu

Viridis Graduate Institute is an accredited, non-profit distance learning institute focusing on ecological psychology and the environmental humanities to change detrimental narratives, behavior, and practices affecting a shared world.

== History ==
In 2011, Dr. Lori Pye founded the Viridis Graduate Institute, along with a group of educators whose focus was on ecological psychology and environmental humanities.

== Name ==
The name "Viridis" derives from the Latin term for "green, to sprout" or the notion of "green life", symbolizing the flourishing and growth of plants and vegetation.

== Academics ==
Viridis Graduate Institute serves as a transdiscliplinary academic institution and resource for those seeking to focus on the connection between ecopsychology and ecological literacy.

John R. Ehrenfeld is a trustee of the Viridis Graduate Institute.

Thomas Moore is an Honorary Board Member.

The institute offers the following degree programs:

- Doctor of Arts in Ecological Psychology and Environmental Humanities
- Doctor of Arts in Ecological Psychology and Environmental Humanities with a Specialization in Climate Response & Resilience
- Master of Arts in Social Sciences with Emphasis in Ecological Psychology and Environmental Humanities Program
- Non-degree Professional Development Courses

== See also ==
- Distance Education Accrediting Commission
- Thomas Moore (spiritual writer)
