= Smartsheet =

Collaboration software application

- Smartsheet Logo

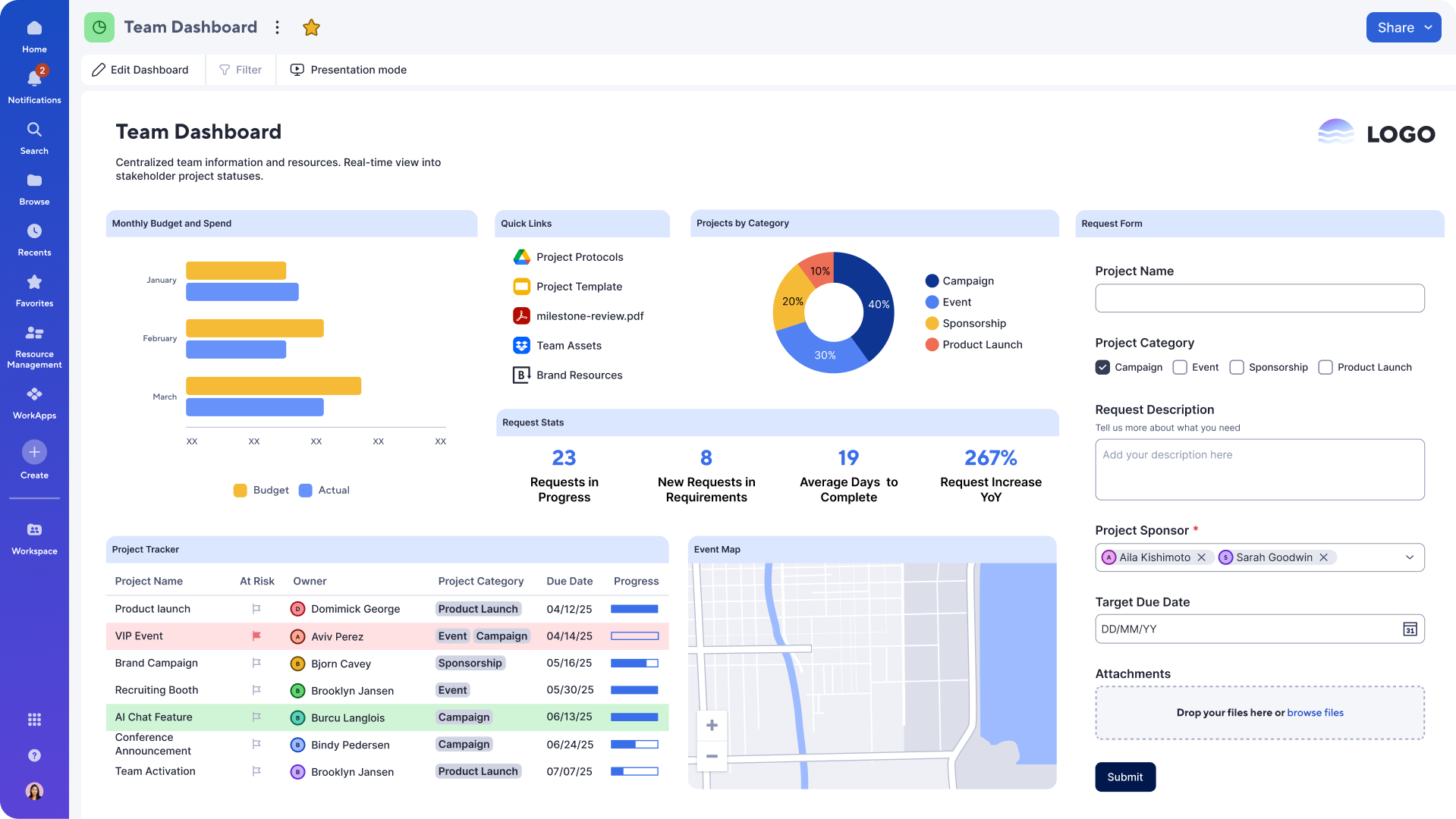
- Sample Smartsheet dashboard illustrating important links, resourcing, project status and embedded forms.
- Developer: Smartsheet Inc.
- Release: 2006
- Platform: Web platform, Android, and iOS
- Available in: English, Spanish, Portuguese, French, German, Italian, Russian and Japanese
- Type: Project management software
- Website: smartsheet.com

Smartsheet is a software as a service (SaaS) offering for collaboration and work management, developed and marketed by Smartsheet Inc. It is used to assign tasks, track project progress, manage calendars, share documents, and manage other work, using a tabular user interface.

== Features ==
Smartsheet is used to collaborate on project timelines, documents, calendars, tasks, and other works. According to IDG, it is "part office productivity, part project management, part document sharing... [it] is trying to be the central hub for how people work." Smartsheet competes with Microsoft Project. It combines some of the functionality of Microsoft Project, Excel, Access and SharePoint.

According to Forbes, Smartsheet has "a relatively simple" user interface. The interface centers on "smartsheets," which are similar to spreadsheets typically found in Microsoft Excel. Each smartsheet can have its rows expanded or collapsed to see individual tasks or large-scale project progress respectively. Tasks can be sorted by deadline, priority or the person assigned to them. If a spreadsheet contains dates, Smartsheet creates a calendar view.

Each row in a smartsheet may have files attached to it, emails stored within it, and a discussion board associated with it. When a new smartsheet is created, notifications are pushed out to staff to populate its rows and columns. As information is updated, other smartsheets tracking the same task, project or data-point are updated automatically. The service also has alerts for when a task deadline is coming up, and keeps track of document versions.

Smartsheet can import data from Microsoft Office or Google applications. It integrates with Salesforce.com, Dropbox and Amazon Web Services. There is also a Smartsheet mobile app for Android and iOS operating systems. The service is offered on a subscription basis with no free tiers.

== Company ==
Smartsheet Inc.
- Formerly: Navigo Technologies, Inc. (2005–2006); Smartsheet.com, Inc. (2006–2017)
- Type: Private
- Traded as: NYSE: SMAR (2018–2025)
- Founded: 2005; 21 years ago
- Founders: Maria Colacurcio; Brent Frei; Eric Brown
- Headquarters: Bellevue, Washington, U.S.
- Key people: Michael Gregoire (chairman); Mark Mader (CEO)
- Products: Smartsheet
- Revenue: ▲US$958 million (2024)
- Operating income: ▲US$−120 million (2024)
- Net income: ▲US$−105 million (2024)
- Total assets: ▲US$1.34 billion (2024)
- Total equity: ▲US$606 million (2024)
- Owners: Blackstone Inc.; Vista Equity Partners
- Number of employees: 3,330 (2024)
- Website: smartsheet.com
- Footnotes; Financials as of January 31, 2024.

Smartsheet Inc. is an American privately held company that develops and markets the Smartsheet application. As of 2023, it had over 3,000 employees, and is headquartered in Bellevue, Washington. The company was founded in the summer of 2005, shortly after co-founder Brent Frei sold his prior company, Onyx Software.

=== Executive Team ===
- Rajeev Singh - CEO

=== Corporate history ===
Smartsheet Inc. was funded mostly by Frei. About a year after its founding, Smartsheet had raised $4 million in funding and had just nine employees. By early 2012 it had raised $8.2 million in funding over three rounds and hired its first salesperson. The company went public in 2018 via an initial public offering and in 2025 was taken private again by private equity firms Blackstone Inc. and Vista Equity Partners. After the Smartsheet software was redesigned in 2010, the company's revenues grew by more than 100 percent each year, for four consecutive years. It raised $26 million in funding in December 2012 and another $35 million in May 2014. In 2017, the company raised an additional $52.1 million in funding. In 2018, it was announced that Smartsheet acquired Converse.AI, a Scotland-based company that develops software for creating business automation bots.

The company began trading on the New York Stock Exchange on April 27, 2018. In May 2019, Smartsheet announced it had acquired 10,000 ft, a SaaS platform that provides real-time resource and capacity planning.

In September 2024, Vista Equity Partners and Blackstone announced their intent to buy Smartsheet for $8.4 billion in cash, at $56.50 per share. The acquisition was completed in January 2025.

== Product history ==
Smartsheet's original user interface in 2006

Smartsheet was developed by Smartsheet Inc, in 2005 and introduced to the public in 2006. According to the company's co-founder, Brent Frei, initial adoption was slow because the offering was too difficult to use. At the end of its first year, it had 10,000 users. The company began making changes to the SmartSheet in 2008, eventually cutting 60 percent of its features for the purpose of making it more user-friendly. Following the 2010 launch of the redesign, the adoption grew to 1 million users at 20,000 organizations by 2012.

Integration with Office 365 and Microsoft Azure were added in 2014. In August of that year, version 2.0 of the Smartsheet iOS app was introduced. The spreadsheet-like user interface, which was part of the web service, was introduced to the iOS app in this version; the developers had not been able to build this feature in the mobile version before. In October 2014, the Account Map tool was introduced, which uses an algorithm to visualize the flow of work across groups of employees.

In 2015, Smartsheet started introducing closer integrations with Microsoft Office products, following the changes Microsoft had made in its products to work better with third-party software. In January 2015, Smartsheet added support for Azure Active Directory, Microsoft's cloud-based directory service that allowed users to log into products like Excel and Smartsheet with the same login. This allowed users to make changes to smartsheets directly from Microsoft Outlook. In 2016, Smartsheet introduced Sights, a configurable dashboard that shows metrics such as how a team is performing against key performance indicators.

In November 2021, McLaren announced a partnership deal with Smartsheet as the team's official technology partner at the 2021 São Paulo Grand Prix.

In 2022, Miro introduced an integration with Smartsheet.

In 2023, Smartsheet was named to Fast Company’s Annual List of "Brands That Matter"
