= International Education Corporation =

Profit universities and colleges in the United States

- Predecessor: United Electronics Institute
- Founded: 1982; 44 years ago in Los Angeles, California, US
- Headquarters: Irvine, California, US
- Areas served: California, Arizona, Georgia, Florida, and Texas
- Key people: Shoukry Tiab
- Subsidiaries: UEI College, United Education Institute, U.S. Colleges, Sage Truck Driving Schools
- Website: ieccolleges.com

International Education Corporation (IEC) is a for-profit higher education company in the United States. It is the parent company of UEI College, United Education Institute, U.S. Colleges, Sage Truck Driving Schools, and, formerly, Florida Career College. The institutions are for-profit career colleges.

== Accreditation ==
The Accrediting Council for Continuing Education and Training (ACCET) accredits UEI College in Huntington Park, Anaheim, Chula Vista, West Covina, Encino, Ontario, San Marcos, Stockton, Phoenix, and Morrow campuses. The Accrediting Commission of Career Schools and Colleges (ACCSC) accredits the Bakersfield, Gardena, Fresno, Sacramento, Las Vegas, and Riverside locations.

== History ==
IEC was originally founded in 1982 in Los Angeles, California, with the name United Electronics Institute. In 1998, IEC acquired Advanced Career Training (ACT), and ACT became United Education Institute (UEI) in January 2010. In 2009, the eight Southern California United Education Institute campuses became UEI College. As of April 2022, IEC operates 37 campuses nationwide in seven states.

In May 2022, IEC acquired the Sage Corporation, which operates Sage Truck Driving Schools. Sage operates 22 campuses in 12 states, including Colorado, Florida, Idaho, Indiana, Montana, North Carolina, New York (state), Pennsylvania, South Carolina, Texas, Utah and Wyoming.

Nearly one year later, in April 2023, the U.S. Department of Education began to deny Florida Career College access to federal financial aid. The department alleged that the college "improperly allowed students without a high school diploma or equivalent credential to test into eligibility for federal aid." The following year, administrators announced that the college would close by February 15, 2024. The college remained open so that students could finish their programs.

In 2024, in a deal with the US Department of Education, IEC CEO Fardad Fateri and CFO Sanjay Sardana agreed to "never again be employed by an IEC-related entity that receives Title IV federal student aid."
