= Ulrik Wisløff =

Norwegian physiologist (born 1968)

- Born: 12 July 1968 (age 58); Inderøy Municipality, Norway

Ulrik Wisløf (born 12 July 1968) is a Norwegian researcher, a professor and an entrepreneur in the field of exercise physiology, and the Head of the Cardiac Exercise Research Group (CERG) at the Norwegian University of Science and Technology.

== Publications ==
- List of publications by Ulrik Wisløff in BIBSYS (Norway)
- Ulrik Wisløff
