= Pai (fish trap) =

Pai in Audio format.

Pai (पाई) or sometimes called Pahi (पाही) is a fish trap fabricated by using Thakal daantha (थाकलकॊ डाॅठ) and Beshram (बेश्रम)/byaye (व्याय)/ajambari (अजम्बरी) thoroughly knitting with rope to make large rectangular sheets suitable for the filtration of water and it is mainly famous in Tharu, Kumal and Majhi communities of western Nepal. The knitted sheets of their desired length and width are fixed in the river of sharp current with the help of solid and large wooden nails (Kila). This fish trap was a very efficient and logical tool for the ancient indigenous peoples, making them successful in fishing. This fish trap looks like the Greek symbol pi (Π). Indigenous people from near villages of Banghushree are still adopting this technique for fishing in West Rapti River.

== Methods ==
The method used for this fish trap is filtration, in which fish are treated as suspended solids; a rectangular knitted sheet works as a filter, and large wooden nails serve as rigid support for the entire system. This fishing method applies only to rivers free of floating debris and other suspended objects.

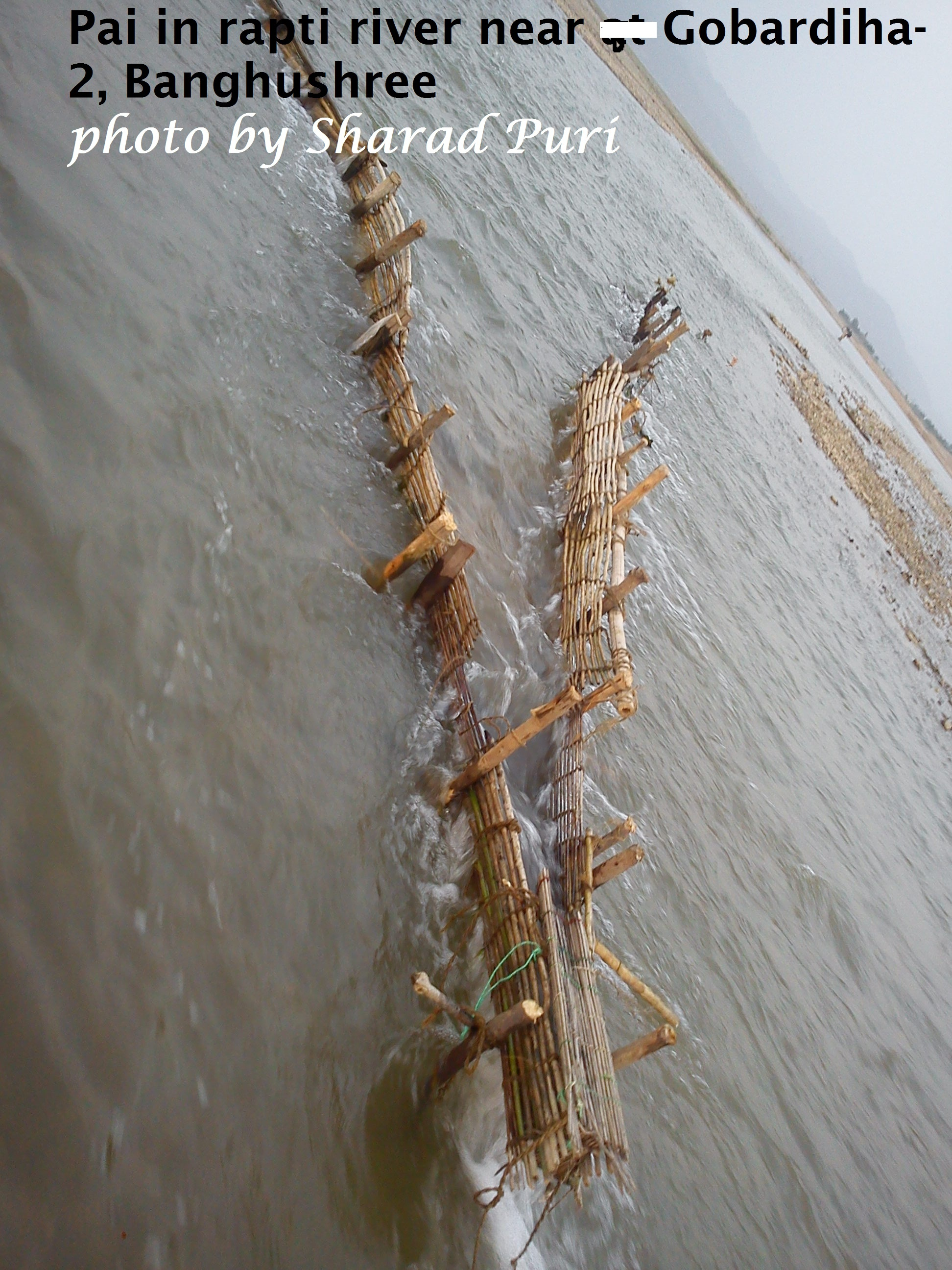
Pai.

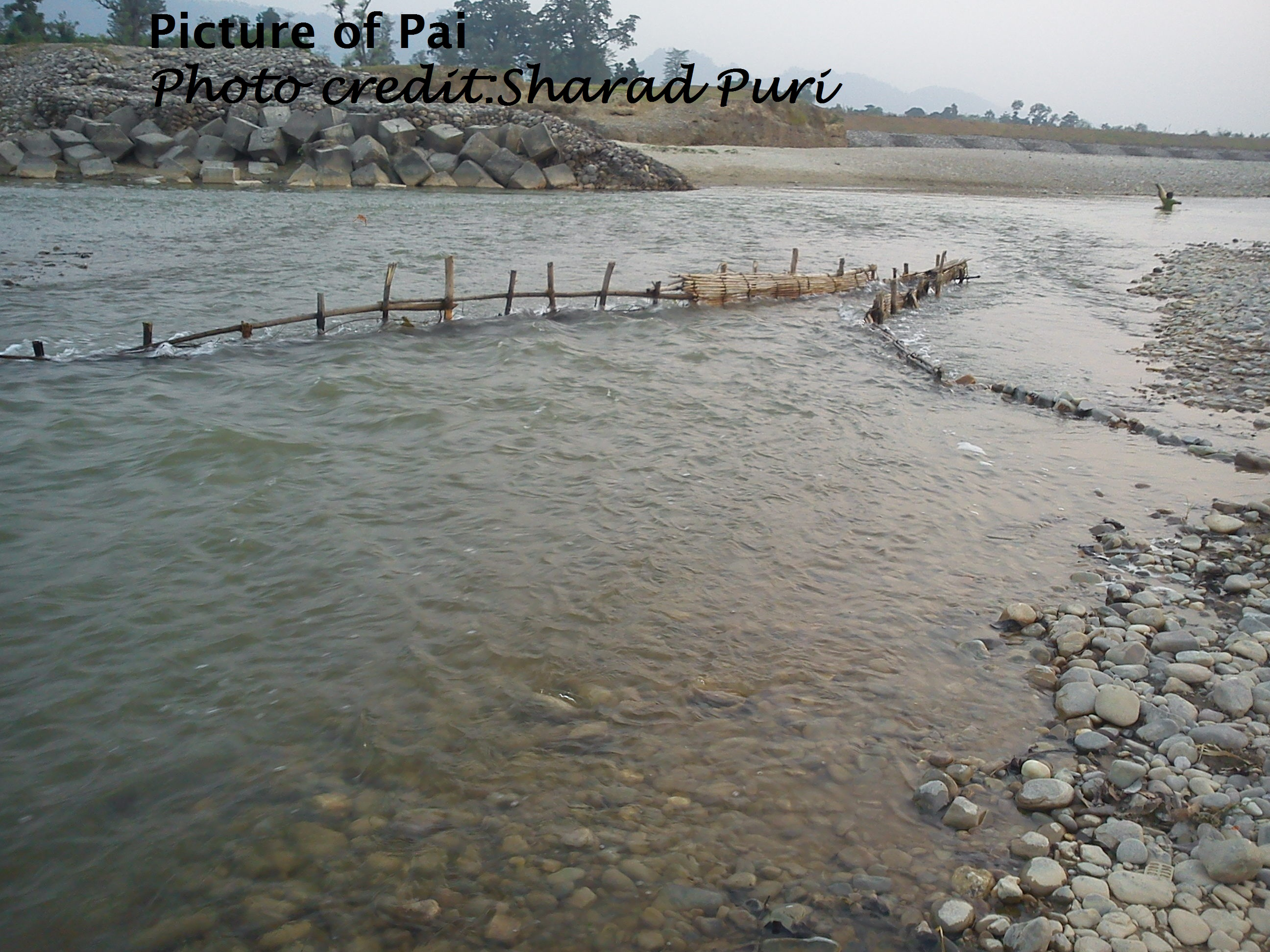
A Pai-fabricated by Bishnu Chaudhary and installed in Rapti river near Gadhawa RM -1, Banghushree, Dang
