= American Business and Technology University =

Former online university based out of Missouri, U.S.

- Former name: American College of Technology
- Type: Private for-profit online university
- Established: 2001
- Founder: Sam Atieh
- Vice-president: Lute Atieh
- Location: St. Joseph, Missouri, United States; 39.7791°N 94.8198°W
- Campus: Online
- Website: abtilearning.com

American Business and Technology University is a private for-profit online university with its headquarters in St. Joseph, Missouri. It was founded in 2001 by Sam Atieh as the American College of Technology.

== History ==
The school was founded in Missouri in 2001 by Dr. Sam Atieh, who authored two books focusing on online education for adult learners. It became the American College of Technology in 2001. In 2002, the school became Missouri's first solely online school when it received the Coordinating Board for Higher Education's approval and started to offer degree programs. The college was later approved to accept G.I. Bill funding.

The institution purchased the Wyeth Mansion in St. Joseph in December 2013 to house physical classes, replacing the school's previous physical space on North Belt Highway in St. Joseph. At that time, the institution had 1,700 students across 30 states and five countries with 50 employees.

On September 29, 2022, ABTU voluntarily withdrew their accreditation from the Distance Education Accrediting Commission. The ABTU website subsequently went offline.

== Academics ==
ABT University offers Certificates and degree programs in Business, IT Technology, including the Master of Business Administration (MBA). The college originally offered retraining services, but expanded to include technical diplomas and bachelor's degrees in global economy, health information technology, Computer Networking and computer programming. Lectures are streamed and recorded from the university's physical headquarters and delivered through the website with enrollment held eight times in a year. A master's of business administration program was launched in 2013. The school, primarily based online, also has some programs that use hands-on training.

In February 2014, the American College was approved for university status by the Missouri Department of Higher Education and accredited by the Distance Education Accrediting Commission. The school name officially changed to American Business & Technology University in April 2014.
