= Accrediting Council for Continuing Education and Training =

American education accreditation organization

The Accrediting Council for Continuing Education and Training (ACCET) is a private, non-profit organization in the United States that provides national accreditation to private, post-secondary educational institutions offering non-collegiate vocational, avocational and English-language training which may be approved to award validated CEUs, certificates and/or an Occupational Associates Degree. The organization's headquarters are located in Washington, DC.

ACCET has been recognized by the United States Department of Education as an independent accrediting agency since 1978.
