= Ashworth College =

Online college based in Georgia, United States

Coordinates: 33°57′36″N 84°14′14″W

- Former names: Professional Career Development Institute (1987–2000)
- Motto: Dito Cum Scientia (Latin)
- Motto in English: "To Enrich with Knowledge"
- Type: Private for-profit online college
- Established: 1987; 39 years ago
- Accreditation: DEAC
- CEO: Kermit Cook
- Location: United States
- Colors: Maroon and white
- Website: www.ashworthcollege.edu

Ashworth College is a private for-profit online college. The college is accredited by the Distance Education Accrediting Commission and recognized by the U.S. Department of Education.

Penn Foster Group, a subsidiary of Bain Capital, owns Ashworth College and its subsidiaries.

== History ==
Since its founding in 1987, Professional Career Development Institute (PCDI) developed distance-learning programs for its high school, career, and degree programs.

James Madison High School (JMHS) was established in 1996 to aid students who need an alternative approach to a high school education. JMHS provides the curriculum needed for students to complete one to four years of high school coursework that will lead to a high school diploma.

In 2000, PCDI established Ashworth College to offer associate degree programs to students who need an alternative approach to a college education. Ashworth College started offering master's degree programs in 2004 and bachelor's degree programs in 2007.

In 2007, all schools under PCDI merged under the Ashworth College umbrella.

In May 2015, the Federal Trade Commission and Ashworth College entered a settlement in which the college agreed to alter its advertising claims. The commission had charged in its complaint that the college had deceptively marketed its online college degree and career-training programs. It stated that some Ashworth programs failed to meet the basic educational requirements set by state licensing boards for careers or jobs such as real estate appraisers, home inspectors, elementary school educators, and massage practitioners. The commission also claimed that the college's credits were represented as fully transferable, although it lacked supporting data that other colleges and universities would accept their credits.

In 2019, Penn Foster, a subsidiary of Bain Capital, acquired Ashworth.

In 2021, the college was no longer accepting new students for its graduate programs.

== Academics ==
Ashworth offers programs for career certificates, career diplomas, undergraduate certificates, associate degrees, and bachelor's degrees but no longer offers graduate programs.

=== Accreditation and licensing ===
Ashworth College is accredited by the Distance Education Accrediting Commission. The associate degree in veterinary technician program is accredited by the American Veterinary Medical Association (AVMA) Committee on Veterinary Technician Education and Activities (CVTEA). Ashworth College is also authorized by the Georgia Nonpublic Postsecondary Education Commission to offer instruction in career programs, undergraduate certificates, associate degree, bachelor's degree, and master's degree programs.

=== Rankings ===
Ashworth College is ranked 52 out of 200 online colleges by Newsweek's list of "America's Top Online Colleges 2024".

== Admissions and financial aid ==
To be accepted to Ashworth College, students must be at least 16 years old or have an enrollment form filled out by a parent or guardian. College degrees require a high school diploma or a GED to enroll.

Ashworth College does not accept or offer federal or financial aid or provide student loans, claiming that this is due to its mission to make tuition affordable to all.
