= Bradford School (Columbus) =

Former for-profit college in Columbus, Ohio

Coordinates: 40.024°N 82.912°W

- Motto: Finish First
- Type: Private for-profit two-year college
- President: Mr. Dennis Bartels
- Location: Columbus, Ohio, United States
- Website: www.bradfordschoolcolumbus.edu

Bradford School was a small, private, for-profit career college in Columbus, Ohio. It originally was founded in 1911 and moved to its current suburban campus location in 2003. It had on-campus housing for students but more than half of students lived in the Columbus area and commute.

It no longer accepted new students as of June 3, 2019. The school remained open for current students to complete their programs through April 2020 and then closed.

== Academics ==
Bradford School provided career-focused courses to high school graduates. Students could graduate in 10–12 months by earning a diploma. Associate of Applied Science degree programs could be completed in 16–20 months. Bradford awarded both diplomas and applied science associate degrees. The school grouped its three major areas of study into three main categories: Accounting, Culinary Arts, Veterinary Technology, and Physical Therapy. The school also offered Graphic Design courses in their past, though dropped this program after the class of 2017's graduation.

== Veterinary Technology ==
One of seven Vet Tech Institute (VTI) campuses, Bradford School offered students hands-on learning in an 18-month Associate of Applied Science degree program. The facility contained an on-site kennel, well equipped laboratory and animal science classrooms, and X-ray and surgical suites. Students worked with many different kinds of animals and were supervised by on-staff veterinarians and registered veterinary technicians. Completion of the school's American Veterinary Medical Association accredited program qualified an individual to take the national licensing exam to become a registered veterinary technician. During the last semester, students completed an off-site externship, coordinated by the institute.

== Culinary arts ==
The Columbus Culinary Institute (CCI) was a division of the Bradford School, and was located on their campus. Bradford's dormitories were available for students, but more than half of the students lived in the Columbus area and commute. The program had an undergraduate population of 150. A high school diploma was a prerequisite, and 54% of applicants were accepted to the program. Nearly all graduates were placed in jobs. CCI awards associate degrees to graduates.

The culinary arts associate degree program required 18-months to complete. The culinary arts diploma program required 12-months to complete. Much of the curriculum involved hands-on instruction in five new kitchens modeled after professional facilities. Academic courses focused on culinary arts knowledge. During the last semester of the associate degree program, students completed an off-site externship, coordinated by the institute.
