= American Sentinel College of Nursing and Health Sciences =

American for-profit online university

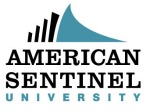
- Former name: American Sentinel University
- Motto: Today's Education for Tomorrow's Healthcare
- Type: Private for-profit online university
- Established: 1988; 38 years ago
- President: John L. Hopkins
- Dean: Kimberly Nerud
- Location: 800 Country Club Road, Waterbury, Connecticut, 06723, United States
- Acquired by: Post University in March 2021; 5 years ago
- Website: post.edu

American Sentinel College of Nursing and Health Sciences at Post University, formerly American Sentinel University, is a private for-profit online university focused on nursing education, with its headquarters located in Denver, Colorado. In March 2021, the university was acquired by Post University and subsequently rebranded as the American Sentinel College of Nursing and Health Sciences at Post University. Prior to the acquisition, American Sentinel University held programmatic accreditation from the Commission on Collegiate Nursing Education (CCNE) for its Registered Nurse to Bachelor of Science (RN-to-BSN) and Master of Science in Nursing (MSN) programs, and from the Accreditation Commission for Education in Nursing (ACEN) for its Doctor of Nursing Practice (DNP) program; these accreditations were maintained following the acquisition. The university was also nationally accredited by the Distance Education Accrediting Commission.

== History ==
American Sentinel University was originally established through the integration of three separate schools: the American College of Computer & Information Sciences, Sentinel University, and American Graduate School of Management. The combined institution offered the technology programs of the American College of Computer & Information Sciences and the business programs of the American Graduate School of Management. Sentinel University was founded in 2004, while the American Graduate School of Management was established in 2000. The American College of Computer & Information Sciences was founded in 1988 by Lloyd E. Clayton Jr. as the American Institute of Computer Science.

In March 2021, it merged with Post University, becoming the American Sentinel College of Nursing & Health Sciences.
