= American National University =

University in the United States

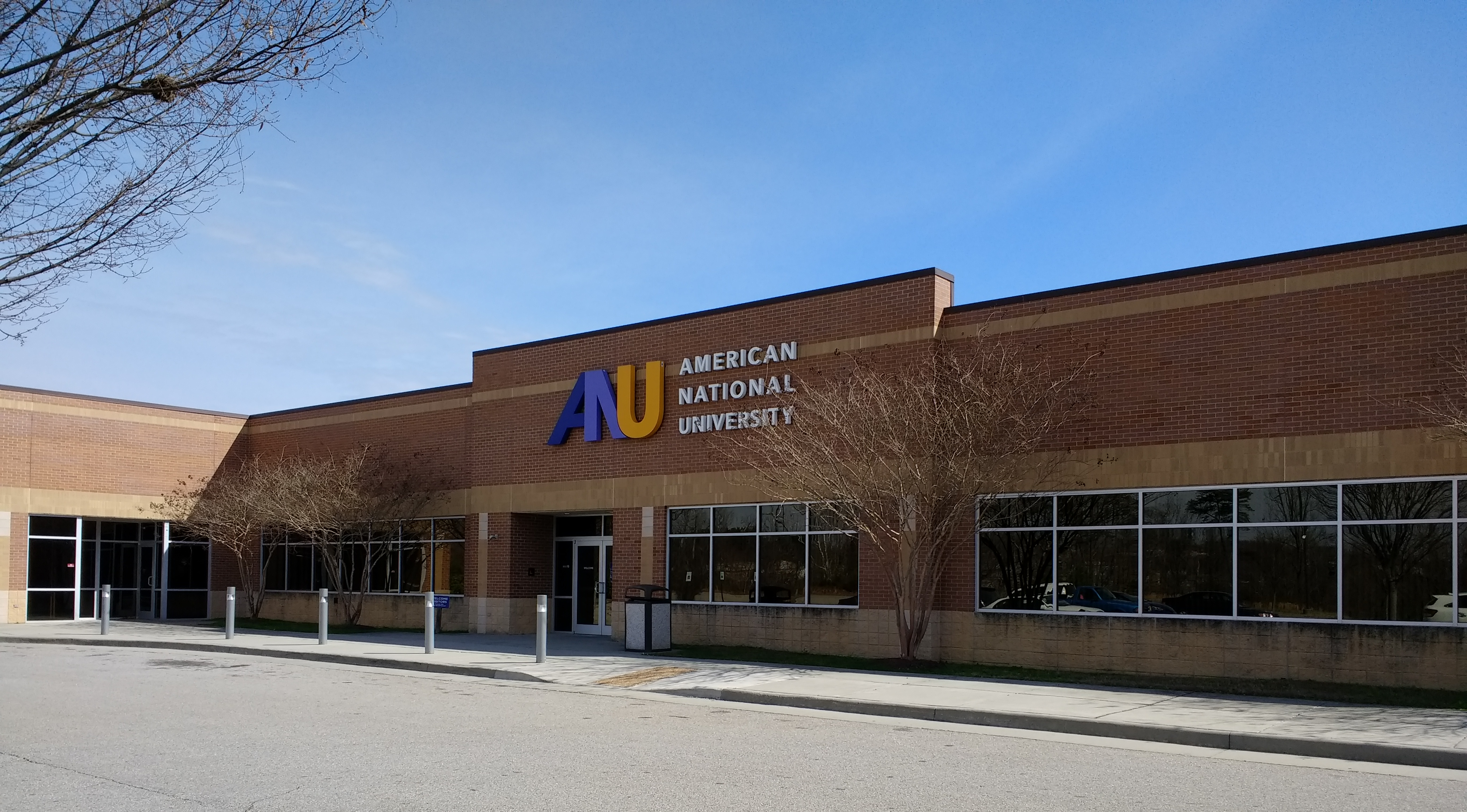
- American National University campus
- Other names: National College, National Business College
- Former names: National Business College, National College
- Motto: We Bring Our University To You
- Type: Private for-profit university
- Established: 1886
- President: Dr. Frank Longaker (since 1975)
- Location: Multiple campuses and distance education, Tennessee, Virginia and Kentucky, United States
- Colors: Purple and gold
- Mascot: Eddie the Eagle
- Website: www.an.edu and kentucky.an.edu

American National University, formerly National Business College, is a private for-profit university with multiple campuses in the United States, including Tennessee, Virginia, and Kentucky. The American National University brand is made up of two institutions. The Virginia institution is the original with history dating back to 1886, when the Kentucky institution joined in 1999. Each institution holds their own accreditation from different accrediting bodies. They both share the same mission: to provide opportunities for individuals who are seeking to achieve their career goals by offering credential and degree programs through distance education and blended learning.

== History ==
National Business College was founded in 1886 as a business school in Roanoke, Virginia. It later expanded to a national business school and developed multiple campuses, rebranding to American National University in 2013. Offers Degrees in Cybersecurity, Business, and Health Sciences. National Business College of Kentucky merged in 1999 and was later rebranded to American National University of Kentucky in 2013.

== Academics ==
The university offers master's degrees, bachelor's degrees, associate degrees, diploma programs, certificate programs and professional training and certifications. No ACT/SAT scores are required to be accepted into American National University.

== Campuses ==
American National University has campuses in Tennessee, Virginia and Kentucky. American National University of Virginia The Virginia institution has one campus located in Salem, Virginia and one campus located in Nashville, Tennessee. They offer many of their programs in an online format with hybrid courses for international residency requirements. Both campuses are accredited by the Distance Education Accrediting Commission (DEAC). American National University of Kentucky The Kentucky institution has two campuses within the state, one in Pikeville and one in Louisville. They offer many of their programs in an online format with hybrid courses for international residency requirements, and the Pikeville campus location hosts hybrid courses for the associate of nursing degree program. These campuses are accredited by the Accrediting Bureau of Health Education Schools (ABHES).

== Accreditation and Memberships ==
Both institutions of American National University are members of the National Council of State Authorization Reciprocity Agreements (NC-SARA) and is authorized to deliver distance education to students in other states and territories which participate in NC-SARA. Additionally, both institutions are authorized under federal law to enroll non-immigrant alien students through Students and Exchange Visitor Program (SEVP) approvals.

American National University of Virginia is institutionally accredited by the Distance Education Accrediting Commission (DEAC).

American National University of Kentucky is accredited by the Accrediting Bureau of Health Education Schools (ABHES). Additionally, there are several programmatic accreditation and approvals for the institution. The Accrediting Bureau of Health Education School (ABHES) accredits the medical assisting program of Kentucky.

== Honors Societies ==
American National University has a charter of the Delta Epsilon Tau Honor Society (DETHS), the national honor society for accredited distance learning institutions. Additionally, ANU was inducted into the Lambda Epsilon Chi (LEX) honor society by the American Association for Paralegal Education.

== Recognitions and Awards ==
In 2012, American National University president Frank Longaker received Imagine America Foundation’s Lifetime Achievement Award in honor of his forty years of service to the school. In 2020, Medical Assistant Advice ranked American National University as 3# best Medical Assisting Programs in Virginia and #11 in Kentucky. In 2024, Research.com recognized American National University’s business degree programs as the Best Business Degrees in America. In 2024, American National University professor, Dr. Telicia Ward-Thomas was awarded the 2024 Student Champion of the Year Golden Goggles by Science Interactive.

== Fraud allegations ==
American National University was one of 153 institutions included in a program of student-loan cancellation resulting from alleged fraud. The class-action suit was brought by a group of more than 200,000 student borrowers assisted by the Project on Predatory Student Lending, part of the Legal Services Center of Harvard Law School. A settlement was approved in August 2022, stating "substantial misconduct by the listed schools, whether credibly alleged or in some instances proven." American National University challenged the settlement. The Supreme Court rejected the challenge in April 2023.
