= World Relief Germany =

Germany-based humanitarian organization

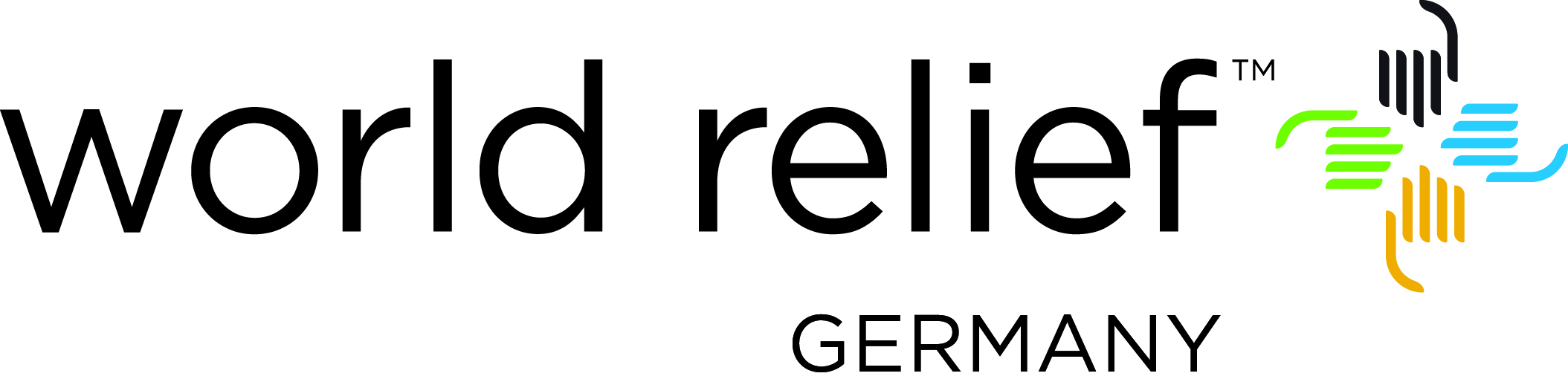
- Founded: 1998 as PartnerAid
- Type: Nonprofit organization
- Purpose: Encouraging and empowering local communities to provide support and help to the most vulnerable individuals and families.
- Location(s): Neu-Anspach, Germany (administrative center), Berlin,(International Office)
- Region served: Germany and worldwide
- Method: Development cooperation and development-oriented emergency aid.
- Key people: Dr. (Unisa) Martin Knispel (Chairman), Michaela Hamm (Board), Stephan Kraemer (Board).
- Revenue: EUR 2,69 million (2016)
- Employees: 14 in Germany and 73 in project countries (Per 31. Dec. 2016, full time staff, volunteers and freelancers)
- Website: www.worldrelief.de/en

World Relief Germany (formerly PartnerAid International, PAI, current official name: World Relief Deutschland e. V.) is a German-based non-denominational Christian humanitarian organization. The International Office is located in Berlin.

The main focus of its work concentrates on 3 thematic areas: Development-oriented Emergency Aid; Health, Water & Nutrition, and Education & Livelihood.

In 2014 the organization joined the World Relief-family, based in the US. PartnerAid International changed its name to World Relief Germany, the PartnerAid sister organizations in Netherlands, Switzerland, United Kingdom, and the United States still act under the name of PartnerAid.

== Operations ==
World Relief Germany partners with people of disadvantaged communities through relief and development assistance, in the three areas as established in 2007: Development-oriented Emergency Aid; Health, Water & Nutrition; and Education & Livelihoods.

World Relief Germany is a signatory to the Code of Conduct for ICRC, The International Red Cross and Red Crescent Movement and NGOs in Disaster Relief, a set of basic professional principles which set standards for good practice in disaster relief.

== History ==
PartnerAid was first established in 1998 by a group of Christians determined to make an active contribution and provide aid and assistance on a voluntary basis, to overcome suffering and poverty in the countries of Central and South Asia. In 2014, its name changed to World Relief Germany after partnering with World Relief.

To date, World Relief Germany has implemented activities in six countries, mainly in the Middle East, and is currently operational in Iraq, Jordan, Pakistan, Somaliland, Syria and Yemen. The number of beneficiaries from activities in World Relief Germany's main project locations in 2016 totaled 130.341 in eight countries, with expenditure totaling €2,340,900.

== Organizational structure ==
World Relief Germany – World Relief Deutschland e.V. is a registered association recognized as a charity in Germany.

The organizational structure of the association is composed of the General Assembly of Members, the Executive Board and the Supervisory Board. Operational field programmes are directly responsible to the executive board but are supported by the operations department of the International Office.

The staff members of World Relief Germany are either employed staff members or work on a voluntary basis in the International Office or are directly involved in the projects.

== Affiliation ==
- Deutsch-Jemenitische Gesellschaft (German – Yemeni Society)
- Erlassjahr.de (association of German development policy organizations)
- Gemeinsam gegen Menschenhandel (Together against human trafficking)
- Micha Initiative
- WASH network

== Partners ==
=== UN Partner ===
- UNOCHA – United Nations Office for the Coordination of Humanitarian Affairs
- U.S. Department of State, DRL - Bureau of Democracy, Human Rights and Labor

=== Government partners ===
- AHC - Australian High Commission
- BMZ - German Federal Ministry for Economic Cooperation and Development
- IFA - Institut für Auslandsbeziehungen (with funding from the German Foreign Office)

=== Other organizations ===
- Carsa - Christian action for Reconciliation and Social Assistance
- Diocese of Peshawar
- Mission East
- PartnerAid USA
- Tearfund UK
- World Relief
- Yemeni Red Crescent Society
- ZOA International
