= Westwood College =

American private for-profit college

- Type: Private for-profit college
- Active: 1953–2016
- Location: Southern California, Denver, Atlanta, Chicago, Westwood College Online, California, Colorado, Georgia, Illinois, and Virginia, United States

Westwood College was a private for-profit college owned by Alta Colleges Inc. with 15 campus locations in five states and online learning options. Westwood was nationally accredited by the Accrediting Council for Independent Colleges and Schools (ACICS). Since its inception in 1986, Westwood graduated more than 37,000 students. The college closed in March 2016.

== History ==
Westwood College was founded in Denver, Colorado, in 1953. For many years, the school was known as Denver Institute of Technology, offering diploma and degree programs in a variety of technical fields. As the school expanded into other industries, the name was changed to Westwood College in 1997.

Westwood College became part of Alta Colleges Inc. (Alta), a system of for-profit higher education institutions that also included Westwood College Online and Redstone College (formerly known as Colorado Aero Tech in Denver). Prior to ceasing operations, there were 15 Westwood College campuses located in five states.

== Issues and controversies ==
=== 2009 class action suit ===
In May 2009, Westwood settled a federal lawsuit over misrepresentation of its graduation statistics for $7 million ($10.5 million in 2025), without admitting wrongdoing.

Westwood faced a class action arbitration in 2009, challenging its admissions and financial aid practices. The suit against Westwood was dismissed after the court found that it did not warrant class action status. The court ruled that the student who led the class-action suit derived "most if not all, of his knowledge of the case from his attorneys" and appeared to be little more than a bystander to the suit.

The Colorado Attorney General's office reached a settlement with the college in 2012, following a two-year investigation, in which the college did not admit any liability but agreed to pay $2 million ($2.8 million in 2025) in penalties, restitution, and attorneys fees and costs to the state. Westwood was also required to credit another $2.5 million ($3.51 million in 2025) in restitution directly to students who financed their tuition with the school's institutional financing program.

=== 2011 disqualification by Veterans administration ===
In 2011, the Veterans Administration disqualified three Westwood College Campuses from the GI Bill Program. The VA took this step after finding, "erroneous, deceptive, and misleading advertising and enrollment practices at these institutions." In late 2011, Westwood stopped enrolling students in their Texas campuses.

On January 18, 2012, Illinois Attorney General Lisa Madigan filed a lawsuit citing misleading job opportunities for Westwood's criminal justice program. Westwood settled the suit in 2015 after failing to gain dismissal of the case. Westwood agreed to pay $15 million ($20.4 million in 2025) toward the loans of their criminal justice students. Shortly thereafter the college ceased admitting new students and announced that it would close in March 2016. Westwood has acknowledged that in most cases its credits will not transfer to other colleges or universities.

== Academics ==
Westwood College Online offered 25 degree programs. Coursework was completed entirely over the Internet via audio/visual technology designed to mimic an actual classroom. The virtual classrooms were supplemented with real textbooks.

Westwood College established partnerships with several public school districts to provide technology, support and money. The partnerships include Atlanta Public Schools, "A Better Chicago" and the Crushers Club in Chicago, and the KidsTek program at Denver Public Schools.

=== Curriculum ===
Westwood College operated on a term schedule. Degree programs started five times a year, and courses were offered year-round during the day, evening, and online. Depending on the degree program in which they were enrolled, students could earn an associate degree in as little as 20 months or a bachelor's degree in three years.

Westwood College's degree programs were organized under six schools: School of Business, School of Design, School of Justice, School of Technology, School of Healthcare and Automotive Technology. Each campus had a different program focus and some programs were not available at certain locations, depending on the regional economic variables and demand.

New students were allowed to take classes for 30 days with no financial obligations. The school also offered an "Employment Pledge" to help eligible graduates financially if they were unable to find employment after graduation.

=== Accreditation ===
Westwood College's campus locations were nationally accredited by the Accrediting Council for Independent Colleges and Schools (ACICS). Each campus was also approved to operate by the appropriate state regulatory bodies.

== Locations ==
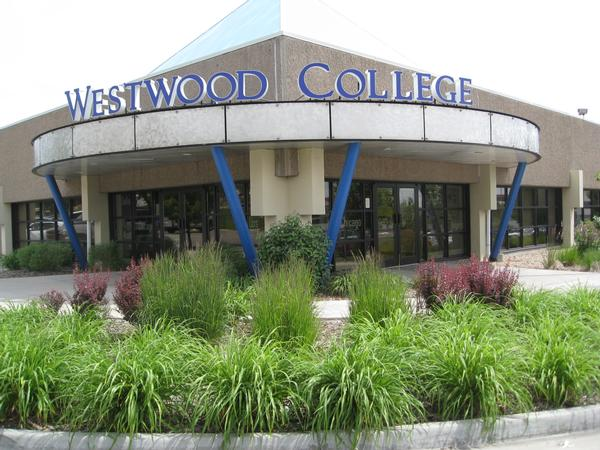
Westwood College Denver North Campus

In addition to its Westwood College Online program, Westwood College had locations in:

- California: Anaheim, Upland, Los Angeles (Mid-Wilshire), and Los Angeles (South Bay).
- Colorado: Denver North (unincorporated Adams County) and Denver South.
- Illinois: Chicago Loop, Woodridge (DuPage), Chicago O'Hare Airport, and Calumet City (River Oaks).
- Texas: Dallas, Fort Worth, Houston (Arena Place, Southwest Management District)
- Virginia: Annandale (unincorporated Fairfax County) and Arlington (unincorporated Arlington County).

== Admissions and financial aid ==
Prior to December 2015, Westwood had an open admissions policy. Applicants were eligible for both Pell grants and federal student loans. In an August 4, 2010 report from the Government Accountability Office, Westwood College was named as one of 15 institutions that "encouraged fraudulent practices" when meeting with undercover investigators posing as applicants. Fraudulent practices cited in this report included encouraging applicants to overstate financial need and hide assets. During a congressional hearing to present the report, testimony by a former Westwood admissions representative provided a descriptive account of a "boiler-room" sales atmosphere that enrolled students who "would end up with a mountain of debt and little or nothing to show for it.".

== Closure in 2016 ==
On November 12, 2015, Westwood suspended all enrollment citing poor enrollment and new government regulations. On January 25, 2016, the school sent email to current and former students advising them that Westwood College would be closing its doors in March after the conclusion of the January 2016 term. The email also informed students of their options for transferring credits to partner schools as well as student loan information. On March 29, 2016, Westwood officially acknowledged the closing of all 15 campuses, effective on March 8, 2016.

== See also ==
- Distance education
- Online education
