= University of the Potomac =

College based in Washington, D.C

Coordinates: 38°54′1.7″N 77°1′56.2″W

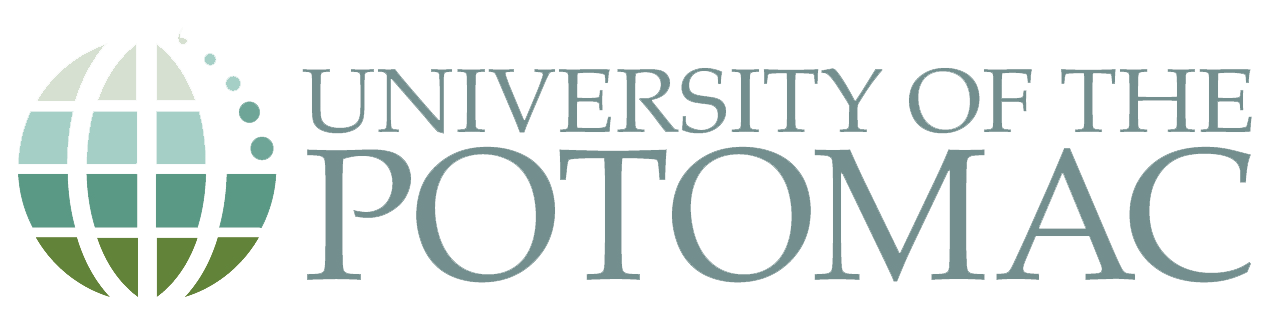
- Motto: Affordable Excellence
- Type: Private for-profit university
- Established: 1991
- Parent institution: Linden East, LLC
- President: Andrea Kemp-Curtis
- Location: Washington, D.C., Falls Church, Virginia, and Chicago, Illinois, United States
- Campus: Urban, Online
- Website: www.potomac.edu

University of the Potomac (formerly Potomac College) is a private for-profit university with campuses in Washington, DC; Falls Church, Virginia; and Chicago, Illinois. It offers Associate of Science, Bachelor of Science, Graduate, and advanced certification programs and is accredited by the Middle States Commission on Higher Education.

== History ==
The University of the Potomac Board of Trustees announced its Interim President and CEO, Andrea Kemp-Curtis effective November 2021. Dr. Gardner was previously president of the university from May 2013 to September 2017 and December 2019 to November 2021.

In 2009 the institution was warned by its then-accrediting body, ACICS. In 2010, Potomac was put on probation. In 2011 it was again warned.

Potomac is owned by Linden East, LLC.

== Academics ==
University of the Potomac’s programs are tailored to a working population. Qualified students can earn degrees in as few as 18 months and all courses are offered online. Students can also choose a hybrid program, which allows them to take both online and on-campus classes.

The university has an open admissions policy. Applicants who qualify are eligible for both Pell grants and federal student loans.

=== International program ===
University of the Potomac offers a five-year international BA/MBA Program under a partnership with University of Business and International Studies in Geneva, Switzerland. The bachelor's degree is completed in the first 3.5 years and the MBA is completed after one additional year.

== Locations ==
The university offers courses at all of its campus locations, as well as online. The locations are accessible by public transportation, and the Washington, DC location is only one block from McPherson Square. Students may choose an online program, on campus, or a hybrid featuring both online and on campus classes. International students attending University of the Potomac must complete at least 75% of their degree on campus.
