= Distance Education Accrediting Commission =

National Home Study Council

The Distance Education Accrediting Commission (DEAC; formerly the National Home Study Council and then the Distance Education and Training Council) is a private and non-profit national educational accreditation agency in the United States specializing in the accreditation of (51 percent or more of) distance education programs of study and institutions. The DEAC is recognized as a U.S. institutional accreditor by both the United States Department of Education and the Council for Higher Education Accreditation.

== History ==
The DEAC was established in 1926 as the National Home Study Council (NHSC), a trade association for correspondence schools. Its formation was in response to a Carnegie Corporation study that found a lack of standards to ensure quality in correspondence schools and protect their students and the public from fraud. Under its first director, John Noffsinger, the NHSC developed a list of minimum standards for proprietary schools.

The NHSC adopted the name Distance Education and Training Council (DETC) in 1994 and its current name in 2014.

== Accreditation ==
In 1959 the NHSC was formally recognized by the U.S. Office of Education as an accreditor of higher education institutions. Currently the DEAC is recognized by the Council for Higher Education Accreditation and the United States Department of Education as an accreditor of institutions of higher education. According to the DEAC, it is made up of over 100 distance education institutions located in 21 states and 7 countries. These institutions include non-profit institutions, trade associations, for-profit companies, colleges and universities, and military organizations.

== See also ==
- List of universities accredited by DEAC
- List of recognized accreditation associations of higher learning
- Educational accreditation
