= List of online colleges in the United States =

Below is a list of colleges or universities that only offer virtual or online education programs and are accredited by an accrediting body recognized by the US Department of Education. The Distance Education Accrediting Commission is the primary accrediting body that recognizes online schools, but not all schools on this list are accredited by that agency. During the COVID-19 pandemic, many of the colleges and universities in the United States offered classes entirely online, particularly facilitated via Zoom.

== Current ==
- Animation Mentor
- American College of Education
- American College of Healthcare Sciences
- American Public University System
- Ashworth College
- Atlantic University
- Berklee Online
- Calbright College
- California Coast University
- California InterContinental University
- Capella University
- Catholic International University
- Claremont Lincoln University
- Colorado State University Global
- Columbia Southern University
- Excelsior University
- Grace Bible College
- Harrison Middleton University
- Henley-Putnam University
- Jack Welch Management Institute
- Penn Foster College
- Purdue University Global
- Sessions College for Professional Design
- TUI University
- U.S. Career Institute
- University of Massachusetts Global
- University of the People
- Walden University
- Western Governors University
- William Howard Taft University

== Closed ==
- Allied American University
- Argosy University
- Anthem Education Group
- Altierus Career College
- Ashmead College
- Blair College
- Brown Mackie College
- Bryman College
- Bryman Institute
- Ellis University
- California Pacific University
- CDI College
- Everest College
- Everest University
- Heald College
- ICDC College
- Independence University
- International Academy of Design and Technology
- Ivy Bridge College
- Jones International University
- Kaplan University
- McKinley College
- National Institute of Technology (United States)
- Northcentral University
- Stevens-Henager College
- Reeves College
- Tampa College
- Tennessee Temple University
- University of the Rockies
- Virginia College
