= Ivy Bridge =

Ivy Bridge may refer to:

== Places ==
- Ivybridge, a town in Devon, England, a bridge there, and a painting of said bridge
  - Ivybridge railway station
  - Ivybridge Community College, a secondary school
  - Ivybridge Priory, a former monastic house
  - Ivybridge Town F.C., an amateur football club
  - Ivybridge RFC, a rugby union club
- Ivybridge (Isleworth), a locality in West London formerly called Mogden

== Other uses ==
- Ivy Bridge (microarchitecture), the codename of an Intel microarchitecture released in 2012
- Ivy Bridge College, a US-based online institution
