= Heald College =

For-profit business college in San Francisco, California

- Former names: Heald's Business College, Heald School of Engineering and Mining, Heald Colleges, Heald College of Engineering
- Motto: Get in. Get out. Get ahead.
- Type: Private for-profit business–career college
- Active: 1863–2015
- President: Eeva Deshon (last)
- Location: San Francisco, California, United States
- Campuses: 12 campuses & online
- Website: Heald College Homepage

Heald College was a private for-profit business–career college with its main campus in San Francisco, California. It offered courses in the fields of healthcare, business, legal, and technology.

Beginning in 2012, it also offered full online degrees. Heald College was owned by Corinthian Colleges, a for-profit education company that also operated Everest College and WyoTech. Heald College closed for good when Corinthian Colleges shuttered all of their campuses on April 27, 2015. At the time of its closure, the college had campuses in twelve cities, in addition to its online program.

== History ==
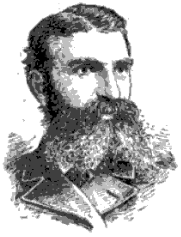
Edward Payson Heald

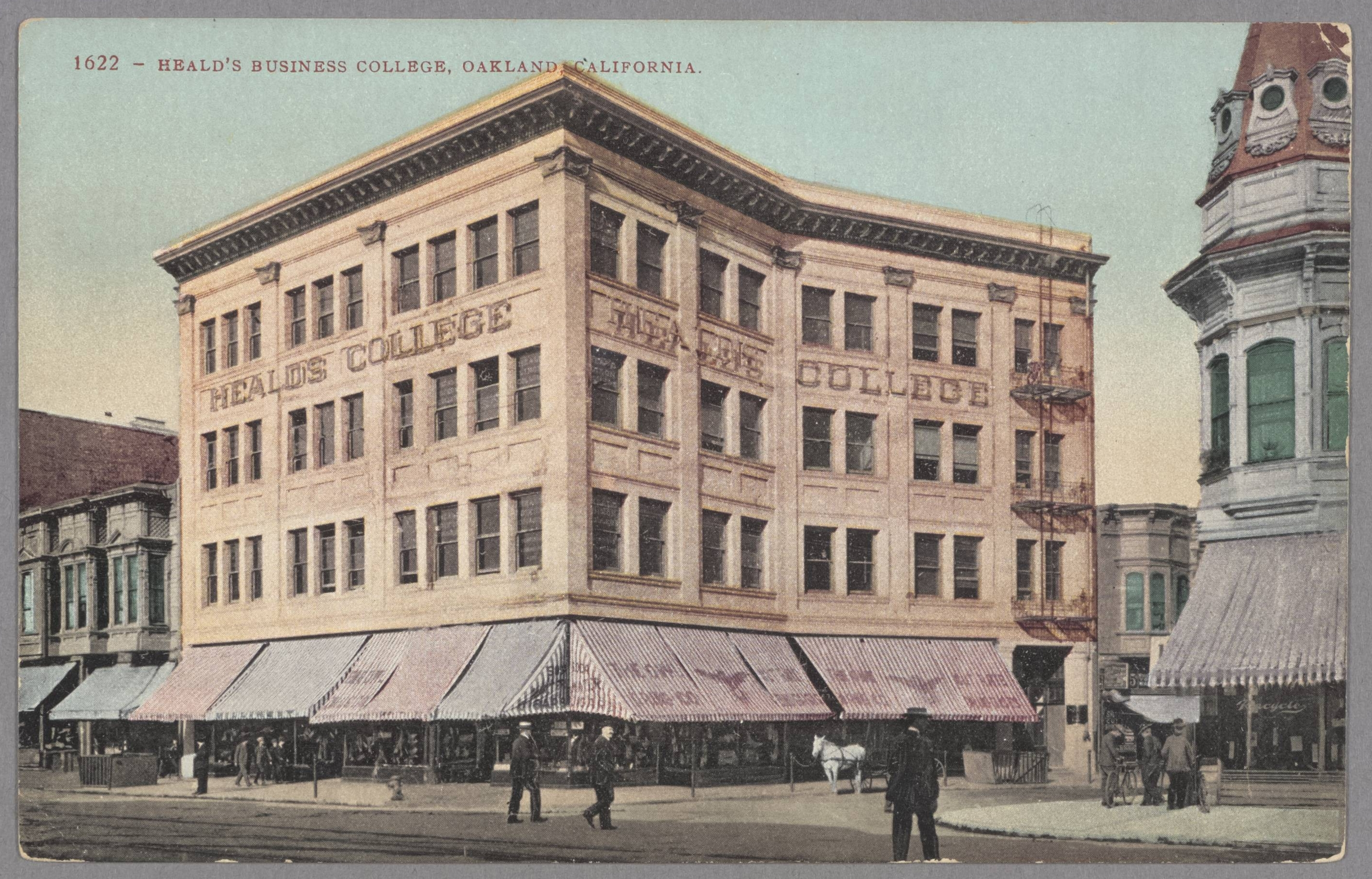
Heald College, Oakland, California (c. 1909–1911)

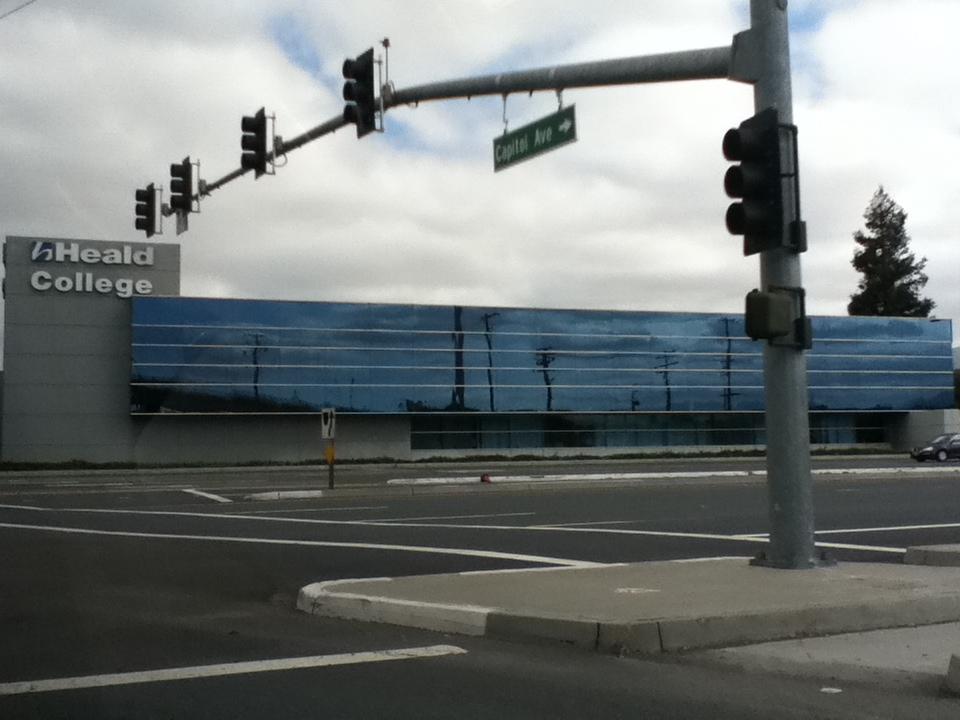
Heald College in Milpitas in 2012; the building was later used as a private school

The college was founded in San Francisco, California, by Edward Payson Heald on August 8, 1863, and known for many years as "Heald's Business College".

In 1875, due to demand for training in mining and civil engineering, Heald created "The School of Engineering and Mining" located at 425 McAllister Street. In 1913 the McAllister Street location was purchased by the City of San Francisco to become the new City Hall. At that time Heald moved the school into a new building at Van Ness and Post where it remained until August 1983, when the Engineering College Division was closed, and the Heald Technical Division was relocated to a new facility at Yerba Buena West.

In 2001, it changed its name from Heald Colleges to Heald College. In 2007, the then non-profit institution was acquired by a private investor group and turned into a for-profit college.

In November 2009, Corinthian Colleges, Inc. purchased Heald College's parent company for $395 million, simultaneously announcing plans to begin in 2011 offering online-only courses leading to degree programs based entirely on online coursework. However, Corinthian planned to retain the Heald name, as well as its faculty and staff.

In 2015, due to findings by the Department of Education of misrepresented job placement rates in certain programs at Corinthian Colleges, including Heald, after July 2010, the department made students of these programs eligible to have their debts cancelled if they submitted an attestation form. Corinthian was assessed a fine of $30 million, and shut down all its campuses, including Heald, on April 27, 2015.

Corinthian had sold some of its campuses. At the time of closure, in addition to its online program, Heald had campuses in Hawaii, Oregon, and ten locations in California:

- Concord
- Fresno
- Hayward
- Milpitas/San Jose
- Modesto/Salida
- Rancho Cordova
- Roseville
- Salinas
- San Francisco
- Stockton

== Accreditation ==
From 1983 until its closure, Heald College was accredited by the Accrediting Commission for Community and Junior Colleges of the Western Association of Schools and Colleges (WASC). Heald offered Associate in Applied Sciences degrees and Associate of Arts degrees, diplomas or certificates.

In addition, in July 2012, Heald College received accreditation from the Western Associate of Schools and Colleges accrediting commission for Senior Colleges and Universities (WASC Sr.).

== Notable alumni ==
- Amadeo Giannini (1870–1949), banker, founder of Transamerica and the Bank of Italy and co-founder/co-creator of Bank of America.
- Charles W. Childs (1844–1922), principal of the California State Normal School (now San Jose State University)
- George Christopher (1907–2000), former Mayor of San Francisco.
- Victor Jules "Trader Vic" Bergeron (1902–1984), restaurateur.
- Michael H. de Young (1849–1925), San Francisco Chronicle newspaper publisher and museum founder.
- Oliver Gagliani (1917–2002), photographer.
- William Gorham (1888–1949), businessman, engineer at Hitachi during World War II, contributing to founding of Nissan.
- Addie Viola Smith (1893–1975), attorney and trade commissioner in Shanghai
- Edward Keating Strobridge (1869–1946) California state assemblyman from 1907 to 1909, then state senator for eight years. After that, he worked for Alameda County as the “sealer of weights and measures” for 27 years.
- Fred Swanton (1862–1940) former mayor of Santa Cruz, California, and founder of Santa Cruz Beach Boardwalk.
