= Corinthian Colleges =

American for-profit post-secondary education company

Corinthian Colleges, Inc.
- Type: Public
- Traded as: Nasdaq: COCO
- Industry: Education
- Founded: February 1995
- Founders: David Moore; Paul St. Pierre; Frank McCord; Dennis Devereux; Lloyd Holland
- Defunct: April 27, 2015
- Fate: Ceased operations
- Areas served: United States, Canada
- Website: Archived April 27, 2015, at the Wayback Machine

Corinthian Colleges, Inc. (CCi) was an American for-profit post-secondary education company in North America. Its subsidiaries offered career-oriented diploma and degree programs in health care, business, criminal justice, transportation technology and maintenance, construction trades, and information technology. A remnant of the schools was owned by ECMC under the Altierus Career College brand until the last three campuses were closed in 2022.

At its peak, CCi operated over one hundred Everest, Heald and WyoTech campuses throughout the United States and Canada. The Los Angeles Times framed Corinthian Colleges as a collection of "castoff" schools that were taken over by Wall Street investors in 1999.

Corinthian closed their campuses in Canada on February 19, 2015, after the Ontario government suspended their operating license. On April 26, 2015, following a series of legal challenges by state and federal agencies, Corinthian Colleges announced that they would cease operations at all remaining United States locations. The closure affected more than sixteen thousand students and employees. Having been extensively investigated for fraudulent behavior by several jurisdictions, Corinthian Colleges, Inc. and twenty-four of its subsidiaries filed for Chapter 11 bankruptcy in the United States Bankruptcy Court for the District of Delaware on May 4, 2015. In June 2022, the U.S. Department of Education announced that it would cancel $5.8 billion in federal student loan debt for 560,000 students who attended Corinthian.

== History ==
Corinthian Colleges was founded in February 1995 by David Moore, Paul St. Pierre, Frank McCord, Dennis Devereux, and Lloyd Holland of National Education Centers, Inc., a for-profit operator of vocational schools based in Irvine, California. The company, whose business model was predicated on acquiring schools that were fundamentally sound but performing below their potential, expanded rapidly through acquisitions and organic growth.

Acquired institutes and colleges

- American Motorcycle Institute
- Ashmead College (Oregon and Washington)
- Blair College (Colorado Springs, Colorado)
- Bryman College
- Bryman Institute
- CDI College
- Duff's Business Institute (Pittsburgh, Pennsylvania)
- Eton Technical Institute (Port Orchard, Washington)
- Florida Metropolitan University
- Georgia Medical Institute
- Kee Business College
- Las Vegas College
- National Institute of Technology (NIT)
- National School of Technology (NST)
- Olympia Career Training Institute
- Olympia College
- Parks College
- Phillips Colleges
  - Rutledge College
- Rochester Business Institute
- Sequoia College
- Tampa College
- Western Business College

Corinthian Colleges faced numerous investigations and lawsuits, including a federal criminal investigation. California Attorney General Kamala Harris alleged that Corinthian Colleges targeted single parents living close to the poverty level, a demographic that its internal documents described as "composed of "isolated," 'impatient,' individuals with 'low self-esteem,' who have 'few people in their lives who care about them' and who are "stuck" and "unable to see and plan well for future," through aggressive and persistent internet and telemarketing campaigns and through television ads on daytime shows like Jerry Springer and Maury Povich."

On July 3, 2014, Corinthian Colleges agreed to execute a shutdown of twelve schools and sell off eighty-five other schools. On February 19, 2015, the government of Ontario suspended the company's operation license, resulting in the immediate closure of all Canadian campuses.

In February 2015, the nonprofit Educational Credit Management Corporation took ownership of more than half of Corinthian Colleges campuses, agreeing to forgive student debt on Corinthian College's Genesis loans.

On April 26, 2015, Corinthian Colleges announced that they would cease operations at all remaining locations effective April 27, a move affecting more than sixteen thousand students and employees.

On May 4, 2015, Corinthian filed for bankruptcy in Delaware.

== Schools ==
=== Everest ===
CCi operated Everest campuses in the United States and Canada, although all US campuses were to be sold or closed beginning on July 3, 2014, leaving only the Canadian campuses under CCi's control.

Everest Institute offered diploma programs. Everest College offered diploma and associate degree programs. Everest University offered diploma, associate, bachelor's, and master's degree programs. There were ten Everest University campuses across Florida, which were formerly known as Florida Metropolitan University.

On February 19, 2015, all 14 Everest campuses in Ontario, Canada were shut down. 2300 students and over 500 staff were affected by the closures. CCi has since filed for bankruptcy in Canada due to the closures.

=== Everest University Online ===
Everest University Online (EUO), a division of Everest University, offered online degree programs. EUO was headquartered in Tampa, Florida.

=== Everest College Phoenix ===
Everest College Phoenix offered bachelor's degree, associate degree, and diploma programs. Everest College Phoenix had campuses in Phoenix and Mesa, Arizona, as well as an online learning center.

Everest College Phoenix was regionally accredited by the Higher Learning Commission.

=== Heald College ===
Heald College was one of the nation's oldest business career colleges in the Western United States, with roots extending back to 1863. Heald offered associate degree, diploma, and certificate programs.

Heald College was regionally accredited by the Western Association of Schools and Colleges Senior College and University Commission. Heald College had campuses in California, Oregon, and Hawaii, as well as an online learning center.

In November 2009, it was announced that CCi was purchasing Heald's parent company for $395 million. In January 2010, CCi announced that it had completed the acquisition. CCi retained the Heald name, and it was reported that it also retained its faculty and staff.

=== WyoTech ===
WyoTech offered career-oriented training for mechanical and technical occupations. WyoTech had campuses in Pennsylvania, Florida, California, and Wyoming. As of November 2018, all the campuses except the Laramie, Wyoming campus were closed; the remaining Laramie campus came under new ownership, providing solely automotive-related training.

== Accreditation ==
Everest College Phoenix campuses were regionally institutionally accredited by Higher Learning Commission. Heald College campuses are regionally institutionally accredited by the Senior College and University Commission – Western Association of Schools and Colleges (WASC Senior). Everest Institute, Everest College, Everest University, and Wyotech campuses are nationally institutionally accredited by one of two national accrediting agencies: Accrediting Commission of Career Schools and Colleges (ACCSC); or Accrediting Council for Independent Colleges and Schools (ACICS).

== Leadership ==
Corinthian CEO Jack Massimino earned $3 million in 2010, and four other executives made over $1 million that year. Eeva Deshon, the president and CEO of Heald College initiated a petition on Change.org to collect positive testimonials about the college, despite the largely negative evaluations by students.

== Faculty and students ==
As of December 31, 2013, CCi's total student population was 77,584. As with the entire education sector, CCi had faced a decrease in enrollment and a corresponding depressed stock price. CCi's top mutual fund holder was Wells Fargo Advantage Small Cap Value Fund.

As of June 30, 2013, CCi had approximately 15,200 employees in North America, including 6,000 full-time and part-time faculty members. For five consecutive years, CCi had been named a Top Workplace in Orange County, California where its headquarters are located.

In 2014, a librarian at the southern California campus of Everest College quit her position when she learned a student she was assisting could only read at the third-grade level, may have a developmental disability, and was unlikely to find work in his chosen field. She stated that the student was unlikely to understand the financial burdens of the enrollment documents he signed. The librarian resigned out of principle after an unsuccessful attempt to resolve the issue with administration.

== Financial aid ==
The Higher Education Act provides that a private, for-profit institution, such as CCi's institutions, may derive no more than 90% of its revenue from the Title IV federal student aid programs. In 2010, CCi reported that it received 81.9% of revenue from Title IV federal student aid programs. Corinthian Colleges (CCI) acquired QuickStart Intelligence in summer 2012, an Irvine, California-based, privately held technology training company. As a B2B revenue stream; CCI acquired QuickStart Intelligence to leverage the 10%, non-government funding essential to back the additional student loans for CCi's core adult learning programs.

Student loan default rate

A significant requirement imposed by Congress is a limitation on participation in Title IV programs by institutions whose former students default on the repayment of federal student loans in excess of specified rates ("Cohort Default Rates"). On March 25, 2013, CCi received a draft three-year Cohort Default Rates from the U.S. Department of Education for students who entered repayment during the federal fiscal year ending September 30, 2010 (the "2010 Cohort"), measured over three federal fiscal years of borrower repayment. The weighted average of CCi's institutions was 19.0%, a 9.0 percentage point decrease from the 28.0% weighted average for the three-year cohort default rate for students who entered repayment during the prior fiscal year. For the 2010 Cohort, none of CCi's institutions exceeded the default threshold set by the U.S. Department of Education.

Loan forgiveness

On June 1, 2022, the U.S. Department of Education announced it would forgive $5.8 billion in federal student loans made to Corinthian College students between 1995 and 2015, which forgiveness would impact 560,000 borrowers and would be the single largest discharge of student loans in history according to the department.

== Legal proceedings ==
Corinthian Colleges was investigated in Canada and by federal authorities in the United States, and by several states attorneys general for deceptive advertising and other fraudulent acts.

=== California ===
In 2008, a class action suit was filed against CCI and a wholly owned subsidiary in Santa Clara Superior Court on behalf of graduates of Bryman College's medical assistant vocational programs. The lawsuit alleged that Bryman made untrue or misleading statements to students related to employment success, in order to induce them to enroll and stay enrolled in their medical training programs. This case was ultimately dismissed.

In July 2007, the California Attorney General threatened to file suit against Corinthian Colleges. Corinthian issued a statement saying: "We disagree with the Attorney General's conclusions, but we are pleased to have this matter behind us. The agreement is not evidence of wrongdoing, and the company specifically denied any wrongdoing as part of the settlement. We are fully committed to providing quality education and job placement services for students and to being in compliance with state law and regulation."

In October 2013, the State of California again sued CCi alleging "false and predatory advertising, intentional misrepresentations to students, securities fraud and unlawful use of military seals in advertisements". According to the Sacramento Bee, fourteen Everest College campuses registered three-year default rates on student loans of more than 20 percent; eight were more than 30 percent.

In November 2013, CCi issued a statement asserting that the California Attorney General's complaint was "a document built on a foundation of misquoted, deceptively excerpted and—at best—misunderstood materials." It went on to say that the California Attorney General was "wrongly accusing our schools of inflating job placement statistics for our graduates". CCi indicated that it planned to "vigorously defend the integrity of the work we do for our students and graduates".

California Attorney General Kamala Harris filed a complaint alleging that CCI had engaged in a predatory marketing campaign targeting job seekers and single parents with incomes near the federal poverty level. The Department of Justice obtained internal company documents in which CCI employees described the company's target demographic as "isolated", "impatient", individuals with "low self-esteem", who have "few people in their lives who care about them" and who are "unable to see and plan well for future". The complaint alleged that CCI had used aggressive Internet and telemarketing campaigns, as well as television ads on daytime shows like Jerry Springer and Maury Povich to reach these individuals.

=== Federal investigation in the United States ===
On October 17, 2007, U.S. Department of Education investigators seized records at Florida campuses of for-profit colleges, including CCi's former National School of Technology in Fort Lauderdale, Florida, and Florida Career College (a division of Anthem Education Group) in Lauderdale Lakes, Florida and Pembroke Pines, Florida. The school reported that it was not informed why the records were seized or why similar actions had been taken against other institutions in the area. The campus reopened the next day.

In June 2013, CCi disclosed that it was under investigation by the Securities and Exchange Commission (SEC). CCi is cooperating with the SEC in its investigation. The SEC did not file any actions against CCi in connection with this investigation.

In November 2013, the US Consumer Financial Protection Bureau reported that they were investigating CCi. In December 2013, CCi received a "Notice and Opportunity to Respond and Advise" letter from the CFPB. CCi responded by stating that it "believes that its acts and practices relating to student loans are lawful and that its lending program is essential to many students". The company also explained that the loans offered under the program are "modest in size and have reasonable interest rates", and that the loans allow many students to attend college who otherwise would not have the opportunity to do so. The average loan amount per borrower is $4,700 and the average annual interest rate is 8.5 percent and the maximum rate is 9.9 percent. Loans are only offered to students who have a gap between their educational costs and the available financial aid from all other government and personal sources. The CFPB filed a lawsuit against Corinthian in September 2014 over its loan program and debt collection practices.

In April 2015, the college was fined almost $30 million by the U.S. Department of Education. The department found the school had misled students and loan agencies about the prospects for graduates to find jobs. Within two weeks, the college shut down.

In May 2018, a federal judge ordered the U.S. Department of Education to stop collecting on student loans related to Corinthian. In October 2019 the same judge held U.S. Education Secretary Betsy DeVos in contempt of court because the Department had continued collecting on 16,000 such loans in spite of the court order.

Loan forgiveness

On June 1, 2022, the U.S. Department of Education announced that it would cancel all federal student loans owed by more than 560,000 students who attended Corinthian Colleges between 1995 and 2015. The amount forgiven would total $5.8 billion and would be the single largest discharge of student loans in history according to the department.

=== Other state investigations ===
In 2004, a former student from Florida Metropolitan University initiated an action against CCi, claiming he was misled with respect to the school's accreditation and his ability to transfer credits. The lawsuit proceeded in arbitration pursuant to the agreement between the parties. After hearing all of the evidence, the arbitrator found in favor of CCi on all counts and dismissed the lawsuit.

In April 2005, fourteen students from Bryman College's Tacoma, Washington campus filed an action against CCi in the Superior Court of the State of Washington. The students claimed they did not receive proper training for their careers in medical assisting, that they were misled about the program's accreditation status, their eligibility to take a national certification exam, the transferability of their credits, and the availability of internships. The case was moved to the United States District Court for the Western District of Washington and was ultimately dismissed.

In August 2007, the State of Florida closed an investigation into Florida Metropolitan University with no fines, penalties or findings of wrongdoing. The Florida Office of the Attorney General and Florida Metropolitan University entered into an Assurance of Voluntary Compliance acknowledging that Florida Metropolitan University participates in the Florida Statewide Course Numbering System to facilitate the transfer of eligible credits to other institutions. Florida Metropolitan University agreed to continue its efforts to help students with transfer credits and to provide students with clear disclosures.

CCi is awaiting the outcome of regulatory investigations by the SEC and state prosecutors. On January 24, 2014, the Iowa Attorney General's office notified CCi that it is leading an investigation by thirteen states into CCi's business practices. CCi stated that it intends to cooperate. No state attorney general case has been tried and no findings adverse to CCi have been made.

On February 23, 2015, fifteen former and current students of Corinthian Colleges announced they were going on "debt strike", refusing to pay loans accrued for their time at Corinthian schools. They originally called themselves the "Corinthian 15", and after growing, as of April 1, are known as the "Corinthian 100" with 107 members. They are currently pursuing "Defense to Repayment" legal action against Corinthian. Representatives were given a meeting with the Department of Education and the Consumer Financial Protection Bureau.
