= Bryman Institute =

Coordinates: 33°41′46″N 117°51′59″W

Bryman Institute is now Everest Institute, a system of for-profit colleges in the United States, with campuses in Brighton, Massachusetts, Chelsea, Massachusetts, Eagan, Minnesota, Gahanna, Ohio, and South Plainfield, New Jersey.

The schools are owned by Corinthian Colleges, Inc., which also owns the similarly named Everest College system.
