= Tampa College =

Business college in Tampa, Florida, USA

Coordinates: 27.9961°N 82.4976°W

- Type: Private
- Established: 1890
- Location: Tampa, Florida, USA
- Colors: Blue and White
- Nickname: Fightin' Dragons

Tampa College was a private business college founded as a coeducational, nonsectarian, and proprietary institution, in 1890. The school was originally located in Tampa, Florida. The final owner, Corinthian Colleges, folded the school into its Everest brand.

== History ==
The school's mission was to provide practical education in areas of business such as bookkeeping and standard shorthand. The original college building (Davis) was three stories and located in the heart of the city. The school was open all year long and was the most up to date in the South.

- College departments included Business/Bookkeeping, Stenography/Typewriting, Telegraphy, Penmanship, and English.
- Full scholarship tuition for any one department was $40.00
- Full scholarship tuition for any two departments was $60.00
- Monthly tuition was set at $8.50
- Three months of tuition for any one department was set at $25.00
- Board, room, and other facilities was $12.50 to $15.00 per month

== Accreditation, Licensure, and Recognition ==
Tampa College was chartered as a degree-granting institution in 1953 by the State of Florida. The college was licensed by means of accreditation by the Florida Commission for Independent Education.

It was also accredited by the Accrediting Council for Independent Colleges and Schools (ACICS) as a senior college of business to award Diplomas, Associate degrees, Bachelor's degrees, and master's degrees. Medical programs were accredited by the Accrediting Bureau of Health Education Schools (ABHES).

== Institutional Timeline ==
- 1890, Tampa Business College was founded as a private, coeducational, and nonsectarian institution
- 1897, L.M. Hatton appointed President, Tampa Business College
- 1904, Capital Stock, State of Florida, $10,000, 10% paid in Dec 1904
- 1917, Practical Bookkeeping published p. 47, LM Hatton and J.A. Prowinsky
- 1929, Sacred Heart High School renamed "Tampa College High School" for affiliation with Tampa Business College
- 1939, Tampa College High School renamed to "Jesuit High School"
- 1940's - 60's, Active in local high schools, US Air Force military contract to teach administration courses
- 1970, Tampa Business College renamed "Tampa College"
- 1970, Affiliation begins with Jones Business College of Jacksonville
- 1968-77, Training programs for returning veterans of Vietnam
- 1970, President, Ralph H. Hanna, opened a new campus in Pinellas County
- 1977-87, Eugene Roberts, Lakeland businessman, owned and operated the Lakeland and Brandon branches as Lakeland College of Business. Roberts served as Director of Admissions at the University of South Florida and as Assistant Director of Admissions at Florida Southern College
- 1982-88, President of Sumitt System of Colleges and Schools, Donald C. Jones
- 1987-88, Jack H. Jones of Jones Business College purchases Phillips College, Lakeland College of Business, and Tampa College. Schools become part of Summit System of Colleges and Schools
- 1989, Phillips College acquires Tampa College along with the other Summit System of Colleges and Schools
- 1995, Tampa College closed with pending lawsuits from students.
- 1995, Tampa College renamed "Florida Metropolitan University"
- 2007, Florida Metropolitan University renamed "Everest University"
- 2010, Everest University Everest University
- 2015, Everest University was purchased by a nonprofit parent company, ECMC and Zenith Education Group
- 2016, Everest University was renamed "Alterius Career College"
- 2023, Altierus Career College will begin teaching out the remainder of its courses as it not taking any new student enrollments.

== Notable Instructors/Alumni ==
- Samuel Henry Harris, Florida House of Representatives 1941, 1943, 1945, Sixth Judicial Circuit Judge, 1957
- Don Herndon, professional football player
- Dean Hamilton, Clearwater Campus, 1993-1995 (he was there before then and after that)
- Peter Nicholas "Nick" Nazaretian, Hillsborough County Court Judge and host of truTV cable network's "Pet Court," 2010
