= The Red =

The Red may refer to:

== Music ==
- The Red (album), 2015 studio album by Red Velvet
- The R.E.D. Album, 2011 album by Game
- The Red (EP), by William Control
- "The Red" (song), by Chevelle
- "The Red", song from Champion Sound by Jaylib
- The Red, EP by Kaylee Bell

== Other ==
- Sport Club Internacional (The Red, Brazilian Portuguese for Colorado), the nickname of Brazilian soccer team Sport Club Internacional
- The Red (film), a 2013 film
- The Red River Gorge, a popular climbing destination in Kentucky
- The Red Trilogy, a book series by Linda Nagata
- The Red, the agents of Discordia in Stephen King's The Dark Tower series

== See also ==
- List of people known as the Red
