= John F. Kennedy University =

Private university in Pleasant Hill, California

John F. Kennedy University was a private university with offices in San Jose, California, United States. The university was founded in 1965 to offer degrees and certificates for non-traditional higher education students, taught mostly by adjunct faculty. In April 2009, the university became an affiliate of the National University System, initially as an independent university. The institution closed in 2020 with programs transferred to other National University schools.

== Academics ==
The institution was organized as a collegiate university comprising four constituent colleges which conferred undergraduate and graduate degrees in museum studies, business, psychology, law, and medicine. The university did not own a traditional campus and instead taught either through distance education or blended learning. Physical locations of the university for blended learning programs were typically housed in leased office sites and business parks.

=== College of Undergraduate Studies ===
John F. Kennedy University College of Undergraduate Studies was accredited by the WASC Senior College and University Commission (one of the successors of the Western Association of Schools and Colleges). The college offered certificate programs, undergraduate degrees, and graduate degrees, including a JD-MBA dual degree and MBA. The college also housed the university's experimental Institute of Entrepreneurial Leadership (IEL) which offered certificate programs and low-cost office spaces. The Sanford Institute of Philanthropy was also housed at the college.

=== Museum Studies ===
The graduate program in Museum Studies at John F. Kennedy University had roots at Lone Mountain College in San Francisco; program directors included Diane Frankel; Gail Anderson; and Marjorie Schwarzer. The program offered master's degrees and certificates in museum collection management and registration, education and interpretation, and later the program developed a dual-MBA/collections and dual MBA/education program.

=== College of Psychology and Holistic Studies ===
The College of Psychology and Holistic Studies was a graduate institution which offered certificates, master's, and doctoral degrees. The college held experiential learning curriculums through three community-based clinical internship programs. The counseling psychology program housed student-operated art camps which taught self-confidence and self-expression to elementary-aged children. The Family Resiliency Project, also under the counseling psychology program, operated with Californian school districts for family counseling and childhood behavioral therapy. The Solt Evans LEAP Project in the Sports Psychology program provided disadvantaged youth life skills lessons through athletics. The college also operated three University Counseling centers in California which provided affordable, confidential access to mental health services.

=== College of Law ===
John F. Kennedy University College of Law offered a four-year, part-time program, and a three-year full-time program. The college housed a housing advocacy and legal clinic offering free legal services to elderly locals at risk of eviction. The college had an enrollment of 160 students at the time of closure. Although it conferred the Juris Doctor degree, the college was approved by the Committee of Bar Examiners of the State Bar of California rather than the professionally recognized American Bar Association. The lack of ABA accreditation limited the ability of graduates to take bar exams and practice as attorneys outside the state of California. The college had a California Bar first-attempt pass rate of 33% in October 2020.

== See also ==
- List of memorials to John F. Kennedy
- List of online colleges in the United States
- List of defunct private universities in California
