= National Education Center =

Profit post-secondary education organization in North America

National Education Center Logo

National Education Centers, Inc (NEC) was a for-profit post-secondary education organization in North America. Through more than 50 campuses and subsidiaries, it offered career-oriented diploma, Associates and bachelor's degree programs in advertising design, architectural design, health care, business, criminal justice, transportation technology, construction trades, and information technology.

== History ==
National Education Centers, a subsidiary of National Education Corporation, was incorporated in the State of California on Monday, January 20, 1964. Its primary office was located at 27 Boylston St, Chestnut Hill, MA, 02467. National Education Centers, Inc had schools and campuses across the United States. Most campuses were nationally institutionally accredited by one of two national accrediting agencies: Accrediting Commission of Career Schools and Colleges (ACCSC); or Accrediting Council for Independent Colleges and Schools (ACICS). NEC acquired the professional training firms Deltak and Resource Systems from Prentice Hall in 1986. National Education Center. NEC began running into financial trouble as early as 1989 and began selling some of its assets and continued to do so through 1997.

Corinthian Colleges, Inc. acquired 16 colleges from National Education Centers in 1995. At one time, Corinthian Colleges Inc. was one of the largest companies in the United States involved in for-profit, post-secondary education. In 2000 it maintained 45 colleges in 18 states in its system, with a total enrollment of more than 18,000 students. By early 2015, Corinthian Colleges and twenty-four of its subsidiaries ceased operations.

Sylvan Learning Systems Inc., agreed to acquire remaining assets of National Education Corporation in 1997. At the time of the acquisition, National Education was the world's largest provider of education through mail or computers. It also owns 83 percent of the Steck-Vaughn Publishing Corporation, one of the nation's largest publishers of supplemental education materials. However, Sylvan's offer was topped by Harcourt General.

Associated Organization Names

As of 1997 National Education Center was a subsidiary of Harcourt General Inc. and had several operating entities.

- National Education Centers, Inc.
- National Education Corporation
- National Education Enterprises, Inc.
- National Education International Corp.
- National Education Payroll Corp.

== Associated Schools and Campuses ==
Anthony Schools: located in California and offering real estate classes, sold in 1983 and later acquired by Kaplan, Inc.

Arizona Automotive Institute: Located in Glendale, AZ, this vocational school training prepares graduates for careers in many disciplines, including Diesel – Heavy Truck; Heating, Ventilation, Air Conditioning, and Basic Refrigeration (HVAC/BR); Combination Welding; & Automotive Service Technology.

Advertising Design Campus: Located in Glendale, AZ near sister school AAI, National Education Center's Advertising Design Program provided accredited post-secondary education in Advertising Design. Students who complete the program earn an Associates of Specialized Business Degree in Advertising Design. The program covered a range of subjects including illustration, animation, graphic design, photography, video editing, and various methods of fine arts and art history.

Bryman College: Bryman operated several campuses mostly in California. The original Bryman Schools were founded in 1960 by Mrs. Esther Bryman as the Los Angeles Colleges of Medical and Dental Assistants. The Bryman Schools were acquired by National Education Corporation in 1975. In 1983, the school names were changed to National Education Center Bryman Campus.

National Institute of Technology: National Education Center operated many campuses across the United States under the name National Institute of Technology and National Education Center College of Technology.

Sawyer Schools: secretarial schools

Spartan College of Aeronautics and Technology: (nicknamed Spartan and initially named Spartan School of Aeronautics) is a for-profit aviation institute in Tulsa, Oklahoma that offers training in aviation, aviation electronics, flight, nondestructive testing, quality control, and aircraft maintenance.

=== Other Campus Locations ===
National Education Center Wyoming, MI	National Education Center Bryman Campus East Brunswick, NJ	National Education Center Birmingham, AL	National Education Center Atlanta, GA	National Education Center Dallas, TX
National Education Center San Antonio, TX	National Education Center Ft. Worth, TX	National Education Center Phoenix, AZ	National Education Center City Of Commerce, CA	National Education Center - Bryman Campus East Brunswick, NJ
National Education Center Houston, TX	National Education Center Des Moines, IA	National Education Center Livonia, MI	National Education Center Cross Lanes, WV	
National Education Center Philadelphia, PA	National Education Center New Orleans, LA	National Education Center Sacramento, CA	National Education Center Louisville, KY	
National Education Center - College of Technology Little Rock, AR	National Education Center Maple Heights, OH	National Education Center San Jose, CA	National Education Center Ft. Lauderdale, FL	
National Education Center - National Institute of Technology Universal City, TX	National Education Center Brookline, MA	National Education Center Baltimore, MD	National Education Center Tampa Technical Institute Campus Tampa, FL	
Homewood National Education Center Homewood, AL ( K-12 )	Bryman National Education Center Torrance, CA	National Education Center - Westwood Campus Los Angeles, CA	National Education Center - Bryman Campus Oak Lawn, IL	
National Education Center - Bryman Campus Detroit, MI	National Education Center - Bryman Campus Anaheim, CA	Bryman National Education Center of Optometry Chicago, IL	National Education Center-RETS Campus, Nutley, NJ	
National Education Center - Vale Tech Blairsville, PA				
