= ICDC =

ICDC may refer to:

- ICDC College, a for-profit career college with four campuses in Southern California
- Industrial and Commercial Development Corporation, a company owned by the Kenyan government
- International Committee for Democracy in Cuba, a human rights organization
- Iraqi Civil Defense Corps
