= Mokah Jasmine Johnson =

- Born: Mokah Jasmine Johnson; Jamaica
- Citizenship: Jamaica; United States
- Education: Everest University
- Years active: 2015–present
- Known for: Co-founder of the Athens Anti-Discrimination Movement (AADM)
- Political party: Democratic
- Spouse: Knowa D. Johnson
- Children: 8

Mokah Jasmine Johnson is a Jamaican-American community activist, politician, social entrepreneur, and educator in Athens, Georgia. She is the co-founder of Athens Anti-Discrimination Movement (AADM), a civil rights organization formed in 2016 as a community effort to combat discrimination.

In 2020, Johnson ran for the Georgia House of Representatives’ House District 117 seat. She lost the general election to Republican incumbent Houston Gaines by a margin of 56% to 44%.

== Early life, education and career ==
Originally from Jamaica, Johnson migrated to the United States. She met her husband, Knowa D. Johnson, in Orlando, Florida in 2004. Together, they have built a blended family of eight children and seven grandchildren. In 2012, the pair moved to the area of Athens, Georgia, where they currently reside.

In 2012, she and her husband founded of United Group of Artists, a special events production, management, and marketing company. Through their company, they have curated multiple community events, including Athens Hip-Hop Awards, Athens MLK Day Parade and Music Fest, and the Athens in Harmony concert.

Mokah Jasmine Johnson was first called to action in activism against discrimination in 2015, when a popular Athens bar called General Beauregard’s served a drink with a racial slur in the title. Although the bar owner denied the accusation, the bar was shut down days later. Propelled into action by this incident, the Johnsons co-founded Athens Anti-Discrimination Movement in January 2016. Johnson stepped down as president of AADM to run for Georgia House District 117. She did not win this seat.

From 2013 to 2016, Mokah founded and operated the VIP Girlz Hip-Hop Dance and Leadership Program, a mentorship and dance program designed to develop the skills and confidence of girls in Athens. Mokah now serves as the Hip-Hop Director for Girls Rock, a program that works to build self-esteem, inspire confidence, and encourage creativity in girls through mentorship and dance.

Mokah has ten years of experience working as an educator, and worked for four years at Athens Technical College as an adult GED educator. She has a B.S. in Marketing Management from Everest University, and an M.S. in Education Media Design and Technology from Full Sail University.

== Politics ==
On August 14, 2019, Mokah Jasmine Johnson announced that was is exploring a run for the Georgia House of Representatives’ House District 117 seat.

On January 2, 2020, Johnson officially announced her candidacy to run for the seat. Her campaign was endorsed by former President Barack Obama, Stacey Abrams, former Attorney General Eric Holder, Georgia Association of Educators, Georgia AFL-CIO, the Georgia Working Families Party, Swing Left, Fair Fight, Democracy for America, EMILY's List, NARAL Pro-Choice America, Georgia Stonewall Democrats, and Our Revolution Georgia.

== Activism ==
Mokah Johnson claims to be a prominent activist in Athens, Georgia, organizing around issues such as discrimination, civil rights, criminal justice reform, gun violence prevention, and voting rights.

=== Anti-Discrimination Efforts ===
As president of AADM, Johnson led efforts to bring attention to the discriminatory practices of downtown bars. This work led to the creation of a local alcohol license ordinance.

In 2016, AADM launched the “United Against Discrimination” sticker campaign for businesses in downtown Athens. In 2017, AADM launched the Swadeshi Black Market and Co-op to promote local minority-owned businesses.

Johnson was pivotal to the creation of the AADM End School-to-Prison Pipeline program and a Teen Social Justice Club after school program. The End School to Prison Pipeline program also provides meaningful community service opportunities for at risk youth and adults, and partners with local businesses to provide career mentoring services.

Mokah also served on a task force created by former Athens Mayor Nancy Denson to develop a community-wide plan for promoting diversity, equity, and inclusion. Johnson also led the push for the creation of an Inclusion Office and Inclusion Officer to focus on diversity and inclusion efforts in Athens.

=== Criminal Justice Reform ===
In 2019, Mokah Johnson and AADM worked with the Georgia American Civil Liberties Union (ACLU), and local social justice organization Athens for Everyone, to lobby for cash bail reform in Athens-Clarke County. The work led to The Freedom Act of Athens-Clarke County on June 3, 2019. The Freedom Act put an end to cash bail for all violations of Athens-Clarke local ordinances, with an exception for violence and threats of violence.

=== Community Policing and Race Relations ===
Working with the local public school system, Mokah has led youth development workshops and “Know Your Rights” seminars. Furthermore, by leading forums on topics including community policing and race relations, Mokah has worked to build unity and understanding in the Athens area. She has not though, worked much with any of the law enforcement agencies in assisting their community programs such as Shop With A Cop where toys are purchased for disadvantaged youth.

=== Voting Rights ===
Johnson was featured on HBO Vice News 2018 Midterm election documentary for her “Get on the Bus and Vote” initiative. In 2018, Johnson served on the Athens-Clarke County Board of Elections as the representative for the local Democratic party. The ACC BOE later used taxpayer money to violate state voting machine law in 2020 then cost taxpayers tens of thousands of dollars in legal fees.

== Author ==
Johnson is the author of Spirit of an Activist: Stop Sitting on the Sidelines. Spirit of an Activist is a 104-page autobiography about her life story, from her early days as a Jamaican immigrant in the United States to her recent activism work in building the Athens Anti-Discrimination Movement as a response to racial injustices in her hometown and nationwide.
