= Gregory H. Adamian =

4th President of Bentley University
- In office July 1, 1970 – July 1, 1991
- Preceded by: Thomas Lincoln Morison
- Succeeded by: Joseph Marr Cronin

Personal details
- Spouse: Debbie Murdza Adamian
- Education: Harvard College (B.A), (M.S); Boston University (J.D)
- Profession: College administrator, Lawyer

Gregory Harry Adamian (September 17, 1926 – November 21, 2015) was the President Emeritus and Chancellor of Bentley College, now Bentley University. He served as president of Bentley from 1970 until 1991.

== Early life and education ==
Adamian was born in Somerville, Massachusetts to a family of Armenian descent. He was raised in Brooklyn, NY and Watertown, MA, served as an Officer in the United States Navy in World War II, serving in the Pacific, and graduated from Harvard University. He then studied law at Boston University.

== Bentley College ==
Adamian joined the Bentley College faculty in 1955 and was named chair of the Law Department in 1968. He also taught at Suffolk University.

As Bentley's president, Adamian oversaw dramatic growth. The college's endowment increased from $385,000 in 1970 to $60 million when he stepped down as president, enrollment doubled, and the faculty grew from 42 to 350.

Adamian oversaw a building boom at Bentley. After he became president in 1970, the college added 27 buildings, including residence halls, classrooms, and athletic facilities, constructing an estimated $70 million worth of infrastructure for the college.

During his tenure, Bentley reached multiple milestones and added numerous programs. Bentley began granting Bachelor of Science degrees in all business disciplines as well as a Bachelor of Arts degree in 1971 when it became Bentley College. Two years later, the Graduate School was established and offered a Master of Science in accountancy and master of science in taxation degrees. Adamian also oversaw the founding of the Center for Business Ethics in 1976, among the first in the United States. In 1990, the traditional business college began offering majors in English, history and philosophy.

Upon retirement, he was named Bentley chancellor and president emeritus.

== Awards and recognition ==
Since 1980, Bentley has awarded the Gregory Adamian Award for Teaching Excellence in his honor.

The Adamian Academic Center at Bentley University houses the Center for Business Ethics, the Cronin Office of International Education, and the Center for Languages and International Collaboration.

As chairman, vice chairman and treasurer of the Association of Independent Colleges and Universities in Massachusetts (AICUM), he was a strong advocate for increased financial aid. He was also a member of many corporate and non-profit boards, including Liberty Mutual, the Massachusetts Higher Education Assistance Corporation, West End House and Inroads.

Adamian was a leading member of the Armenian-American community and an articulate spokesman on the Armenian genocide. A founding director of the National Association for Armenian Studies and Research, he helped establish an endowed chair in Armenian studies at Harvard University. In 1990, he received the Humanity Award from Facing History and Ourselves for his work as a spokesman for the Armenian-American community. He has worked with other members of the Armenian diaspora to fund the education of students from Armenia who would otherwise not be able to attend American colleges.

Adamian served as chair of the Committee for the Resettlement of Armenians in the United States.

He was also the recipient of the Ellis Island Medal of Honor for lifetime contributions to education, business, law, and cultural and civic life in America.

He served on the boards of the International Armenian General Benevolent Union, St. Nerses Seminary and the Armenian National Science and Education Fund. In 1998, he received the medal of St. Sahag and St. Mesrob from Karekin I, Catholicos of All Armenians.

In 1991, he received an honorary Doctor of Laws degree from Boston University and an honorary degree from Bentley University.

Dr. Adamian died on Saturday, November 21, 2015 at his home in Medford, Massachusetts. He is survived by his wife, the former Debbie Murdza, and two sons, Gregory and Daniel (1961-2019).
