= Weinbaum =

Weinbaum is a Germanic surname. Notable people with the name include:

- Batya Weinbaum (born 1952), American poet, feminist, artist, editor, and professor
- Sheldon Weinbaum (born 1937), American biomedical engineer
- Stanley G. Weinbaum (1902–1935), American science fiction writer

== Other uses ==
- Weinbaum (crater), impact crater in the Mare Australe quadrangle of Mars
