= Voluntary Flexible Agreement =

The Voluntary Flexible Agreement (VFA) was created by the United States Congress in 1998 during a reauthorization of the Higher Education Act of 1965. The VFA enables Federal Family Education Loan Program (FFELP) guarantors to develop programs and techniques to help borrowers avoid student-loan default and all of its negative consequences. The VFA objective is experimentation for the purpose of finding the best practices, collecting long-term data, and sharing results in order to determine what benefits schools, students, the federal government, and the American taxpayer. [1]

== New Methods ==
The VFA allows for the development of new methods for debt management and default prevention. Previously, the guarantor financing model was more focused on default collection. Approximately 60 percent of a loan guarantor's revenue was generated from the collection of defaulted loans, with less than 10 percent coming from default prevention and zero percent coming from delinquency prevention. [1] Under the VFA, focus shifted to proactive delinquency, which means to stop repayment problems before they begin.

== "First Generation" VFAs ==
Originally, the government entered into a VFA with only four guarantors. The "first generation" VFA organizations are American Student Assistance (ASA), California Student Aid Commission/EdFund, Great Lakes Higher Education Corporation (Great Lakes) and Texas Guaranteed Student Loan Corporation (TG). Before the first VFA, the federal student loan program existed for nearly 40 years without any definitive data on what prevents delinquency and default. Since the approval of the first generation VFAs, the following has been realized:

- reductions in cohort default rates of as much as 47 percent
- an average reduction in federal default "trigger" rates (an annual federal measurement representing the percentage of borrowers in repayment who default during that fiscal year) by as much as 24%
- a conversion of defaulted loans to loans in good standing
- the creation of programs specifically focused on financial literacy and debt management education for students and their families [1]

The First Generation VFAs found that preventing delinquency is key in preventing default. Studies conducted by the First Generation VFAs found that educating students early and often about student loan repayment is an effective way to prevent late payments. Each guarantor invested in training programs to enhance its counselors' telephone skills. Counselors became more familiar with default prevention goals and learned appropriate strategies for resolving underlying causes of borrower delinquency. Best practice found that the best time to intervene is during the six-month grace period after a student graduates, withdraws, or drops below half-time attendance in school.

== Consequences of Defaulting on a Loan ==
After a loan has been in default for 270 days (meaning no payment has been made) and the loan agency is unable to collect the loan, the loan is turned over to the state's guarantor. The loan may become "accelerated," meaning the entire balance will be due in a single payment. The following steps may be taken in order to collect the loan. The United States Department of the Treasury may offset federal and/or state tax refunds. The Department may also require an employer to garnish 15% of disposable employee pay to be put toward repayment of the loan. Additional collection costs may be assessed. Legal action may be taken against the defaulted borrower. And finally, the credit bureau may be notified, resulting in a damaged credit rating. [2]

== Options for Defaulted Borrowers ==
Through the VFA proposal, borrowers who previously defaulted on their loans are able to enter a rehabilitation process and clean up their credit reports. [3] In the loan rehabilitation process, borrowers can reverse their delinquent status by making nine voluntary, on-time, consecutive payments. Borrowers can also get assistance in re-establishing eligibility for federal student aid.

== See also ==
- Surety
- American Student Assistance
- Student Loan Guarantor
- Cohort Default Rate
