= Ashmead College =

For-profit college system in the United States

Ashmead College is the former name of a system of for-profit colleges located in the Pacific Northwest region of the United States and owned by Corinthian Colleges.

== History ==
The school was founded in 1974 as the Seattle Massage School. In 1999 the school began operating under the Ashmead College name. In August 2003, Corinthian Colleges, Inc. purchased Career Choices, Inc., the owner of Ashmead College, as a wholly owned subsidiary. In February 2007, the Everett campus closed and was consolidated with the Seattle location. The remaining campuses changed their names to either Everest Institute or Everest College in December 2007.

== Campuses ==
Campuses were located in Washington in the cities of Everett, Seattle, Tacoma, and Vancouver, and in Tigard, Oregon. The schools offered career college programs in fitness training and massage therapy.
