= Payne Jennings Jr. =

Korean War veteran and United States Air Force officer (1916 – 1951)

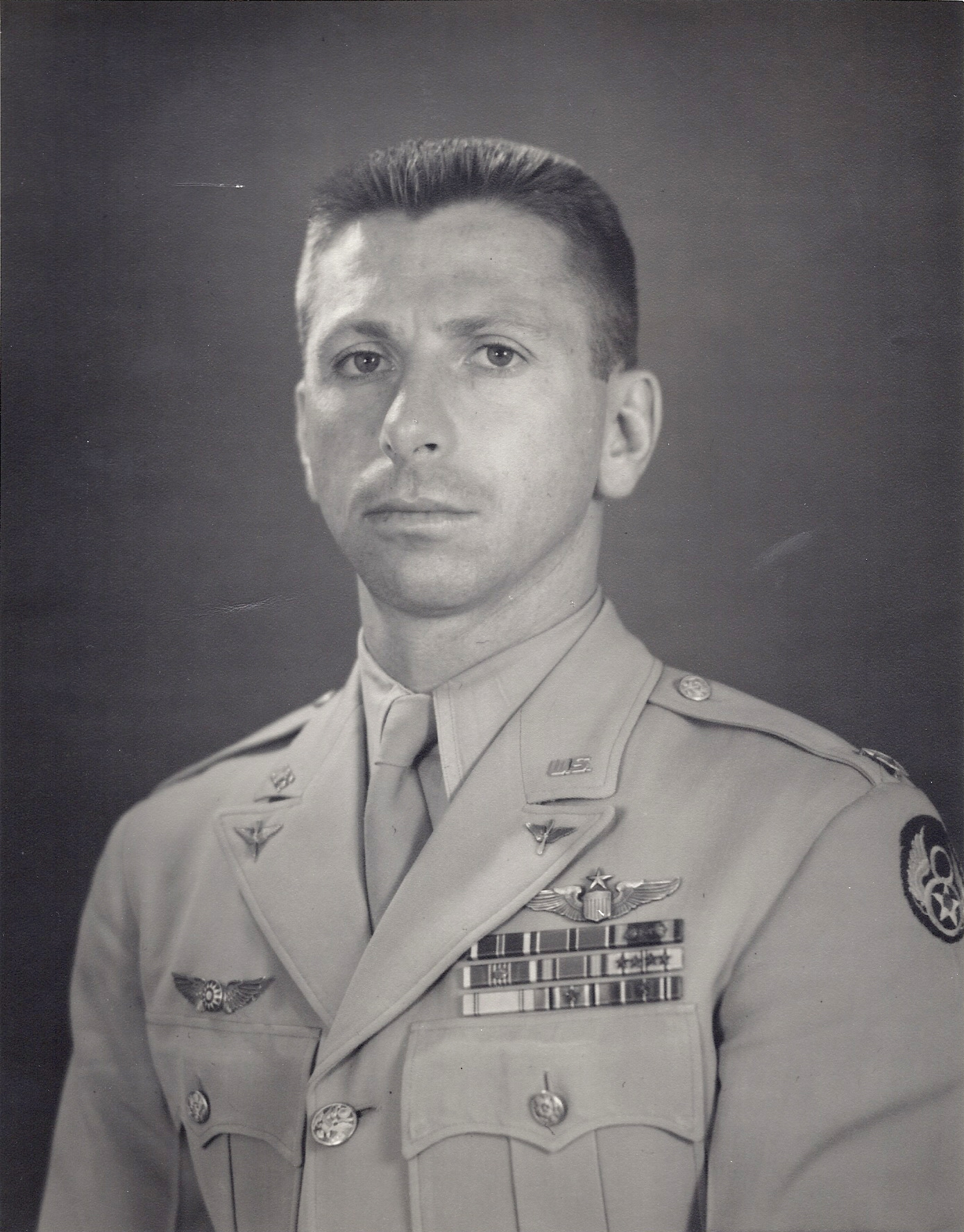
- Colonel Payne Jennings Jr.
- Born: October 26, 1916; Chicago, Illinois
- Died: March 29, 1951 (aged 34); East China Sea
- Military career
- Allegiance: United States
- Branch: United States Air Force
- Service years: 1939–1951
- Rank: Colonel
- Nickname: Pete
- Commands: 22nd Bombardment Group; 19th Bombardment Group
- Conflicts: World War II; Korean War
- Awards: Silver Star; Legion of Merit; Distinguished Flying Cross (2); Bronze Star (2); Air Medal (5); Army Commendation Medal (2); Purple Heart

Payne Jennings Jr. (October 26, 1916 – March 29, 1951), a World War II and Korean War veteran was a highly decorated United States Air Force officer.

Born in Chicago, Illinois, and received his high school education in La Jolla, California, and two years of technical training at the General Motors Institute of Technology in Flint, Michigan. His military training included: Spartan School of Aeronautics, Tulsa, Oklahoma; Basic Flying, Randolph Field, Texas; Advanced Flying Kelly Field, Texas; Bomb Commander Training, Sandia Base, New Mexico; and, Radar Bombing Indoctrination, Mather AFB, California.

After receiving his commission in 1940, Jennings was assigned as flight instructor at Randolf Field; followed by Maxwell Field, Alabama; and, then Hendricks Field, Florida. At Hendricks he served as director of flying at the Combat Crew School, and commanding officer of the Instructor's School.

== World War II ==
Between April 8 and June 5, 1943, Jennings was on detached service with Headquarters, Army Air Forces, Washington, D.C. serving as pilot of the B-17 which carried the Chief of Air Staff, Major General George E. Stratemeyer, on a secret mission into nearly all the active theaters of operations, then returning to Hendricks Field.

On July 26, 1943, he departed for duty in the India Burma Theater of Operations, where he served as chief of training and flying safety for the entire theater, and pilot to General Stratemeyer, the commanding general and chief of Operations Section (Eastern Air Command). He also supervised the air transfer of the Army Air Forces Headquarters from India to China.

== Between wars ==
In October 1945, Jennings returned to the US, where he was assigned to the 509th Composite Group stationed at the Roswell Army Air Field, New Mexico. He was assigned duty as commanding officer of the Air Transport Unit during Operation Crossroads (Bikini Atoll - Atomic Bomb Test) and served overseas from May 6 to August 19, 1945. As Commanding Officer of the Air Transport Unit, Joint Task Force One, he operated an overseas airline with terminals at Kwajelein Island, Kwajaelain Atoll, Marshall Islands and Roswell, New Mexico. His unit operated over this five-month assignment without the loss of an aircraft and without a personnel casualty. During the Able Test, then Lt. Colonel Jennings, flew in one of the B-17 mother ships that sent a radio-controlled drone through the cloud a few moments after detonation.

Following the Crossroads project, August 23, 1946, Jennings was assigned duty as deputy commanding officer of the 509th Bombardment Group with additional duties as deputy base commander. The 509th was Heavy Bomber Air Force with nuclear strike capability that became fully operational in February 1947. On July 8, 1947, Colonel William H. Blanchard, the 509th Base Commander issued an official Army Air Force press release stating that the base intelligence office had recovered a so-called "flying disk" not far from Roswell triggering the Roswell incident. Apparently, wreckage had been found the previous week by a local rancher, and once General Roger M. Ramey was informed, he ordered it be flown to Fort Worth Army Air Field. Although, then Lt. Col. Jennings, never confirmed his involvement with any such incident, he has been repeatedly identified in numerous reports and affidavits to have been personally involved, including piloting the B-29, with the recovered and questionable wreckage, to Ft. Worth Texas.

On December 5, 1947, Jennings was transferred to Headquarters Eighth Air Force at Fort Worth, Texas, with duties as chief of staff of the Air Task Group, (Operation Sandstone - Atomic Bomb Test). He served overseas during this project from February 8 to June 1, 1948, and was appointed commanding officer of the Air Task Group on February 10, 1948.

From July 7, 1948, to June 30, 1949, Jennings was assigned to the 22nd Bombardment Group as B-29 Group Commander, stationed at Smoky Hill Air Force Base, Kansas; a 3-month detachment in Lakenheath, England; and later at March Air Force Base, California. He was assigned to Headquarters Squadron, 22nd Bombardment Wing on July 1, 1949, serving as group commander and wing director of operations.

== Korean War ==
On July 5, 1950, a detachment of the 22nd Bombardment Group Medium was assigned to Headquarters Far East Forces Bomber Command Yokota AFB, Tokyo, Japan, Jennings was appointed chief of combat operations and assistant deputy for operations. Soon after arrival, Jennings got immediately involved in the action. On July 13 following the first major strike of the Korean War, Jennings, in order to obtain visual reconnaissance of the destroyed Wonsan Oil Refinery, went in alone in a B-29 under a 400 ft. ceiling in the rain at 280 mph. where a nearby airdrome (enemy air strip) was strafed, a big oil tank was blown up, the city was worked over, and almost point blank exchanges with flak batteries that were firing down from nearby hills. Jennings and his crew got the reconnaissance photos and Jennings was awarded the Distinguished Flying Cross for the mission.

On September 26, 1950, Jennings was promoted to full colonel and was assigned to Kadena AFB, Okinawa, Japan Headquarters, 19th Bombardment Group as group commander. In addition to overseeing command of the 19th's 28th, 30th, and 98th Squadrons, Jennings personally flew in over 28 bombing missions, several of which he led. During the initial three months of the war, the 19th performed at an intense and exceptional level of operations where the 19th continued to fly at the highest possible sortie rate that could be sustained on a seven-day week. The Group flew its 128th mission on Christmas Day since the advent of hostilities on June 25 and without a single replacement since the war started.

In addition to being the initial bomb group to enter the Korean War, the 19th Bombardment Group had an exclusive experimental weapon, a radio-guided bomb called the VB-13 Tarzon Bomb. This huge 12,000-pound bomb required special conditioning to the underside of three B-29s, one of which was lost carrying Colonel Jennings and his crew on March 29, 1951. Apparently his B-29, #1749, lost two engines in an attempt to salvo the Tarzon Bomb at a very low altitude over the ocean, resulting in a premature detonation that took their aircraft down. After a full-scale area search, no trace of the B-29 or those on board was found, and the search was suspended on April 7, 1951. He received the Legion of Merit for his work with the Tarzon bomb program.

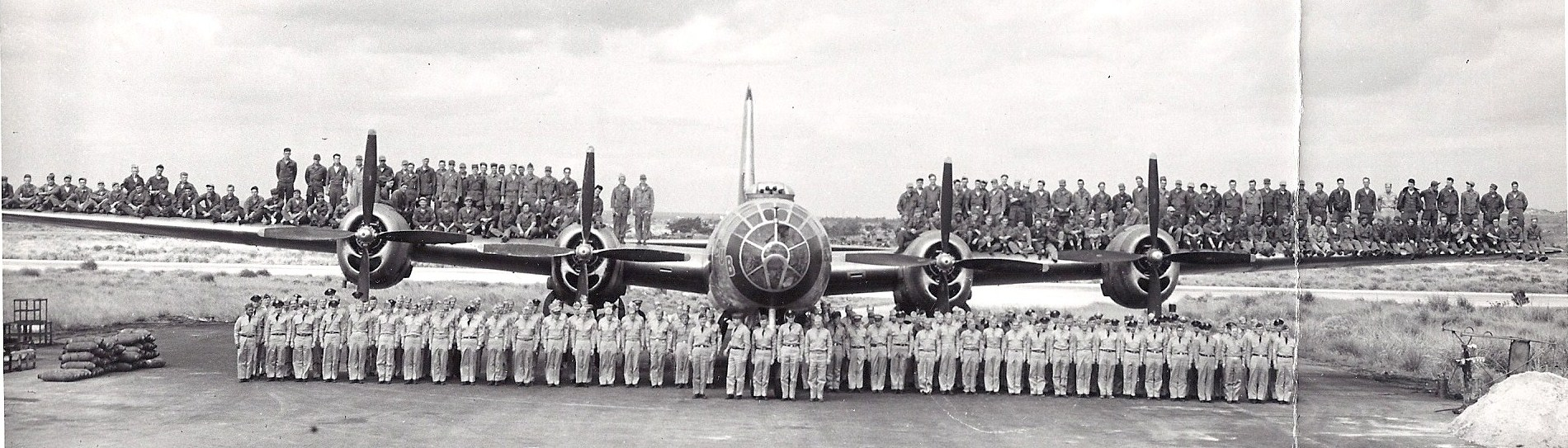
19th Bomb Group staff and crew on and in front of B-29 "BUB" in Okinawa 1950–1951. Colonel Jennings is in the center of the photo just left of the nose gear.

By the end of the Korean War in 1953, the 19th Bombardment Group had lost 91 crew members and 20 B-29s and was awarded its ninth U.S. Presidential Unit Citation and the Korean Presidential Citation. To this day the 19th has the distinction of having been the most decorated unit in the Strategic Air Command and one of the most decorated units in U.S. Military Service.

In his honor, The Payne Jennings Trophy was created and awarded to the bombardment or strategic reconnaissance wings that won the seven competitive bomber-stream missions conducted by the Strategic Air Command's Fifteenth Air Force from October 1954 through December 1955. The trophy has since been retired and, as of 1965, was on display in the foyer of the 99th Bombardment Wing's headquarters at Westover Air Force Base, Massachusetts.

== Decorations and awards ==
- Silver Star
- Legion of Merit
- Distinguished Flying Cross with one Oak Leaf Cluster
- Bronze Star with one Oak Leaf Cluster
- Air Medal with five Oak Leaf Clusters
- Army Commendation Medal with one Oak Leaf Cluster
- Purple Heart
- American Campaign Medal
- World War II Victory Medal
- European-African-Middle Eastern Campaign Medal with one Silver Service Star
- Asiatic-Pacific Campaign Medal
- National Defense Service Medal
- United Nations Service Medal
- Korean Service Medal with three Bronze Service Stars
- Republic of Korea Presidential Unit Citation
- Korean War Service Medal (50th Anniversary Citation)
- Presidential Unit Citation
- Aviation Badge "Senior Pilot" Wings
- Foreign Award - Honorary Chinese Air Force Wings
