= Phillip Chorba =

American actor

- Born: New York City, New York, U.S.
- Education: Union College
- Occupation: Actor
- Height: 6 ft 3 in (191 cm)

Phillip Chorba is an actor who has played roles in films such as Silver Linings Playbook and Concussion; television shows such as The Knick, Broad City, and Blue Bloods; and also frequently appears in television commercials. In Silver Linings Playbook, he played the role of Jennifer Lawrence's ex-boyfriend Jordie. Chorba also had a role in the psychological thriller The Red.

== Early life and education ==
Born in New York City and raised in Allendale, New Jersey, Chorba graduated from Saint Joseph Regional High School in Montvale, New Jersey before majoring in theatre at Union College, where he graduated in 2005. He initially contemplated pursuing a career in football, but turned his focus to acting after being sidelined for a season (in college) because of an injury. After college, Chorba studied for three years at the Upright Citizens Brigade Theatre, an improvisational theater and training center in Manhattan.

Chorba is of half Italian and half Hungarian descent.

== Personal life ==
Chorba married his high-school sweetheart Dawn in 2008. They reside in the Finger Lakes of NY and have a son and a daughter.
