= Spartan College of Aeronautics and Technology =

For-profit aviation institute in Tulsa, Oklahoma

Coordinates: 36°10′35″N 95°52′44″W

Spartan College of Aeronautics & Technology
- Motto: Knowledge and Skill Overcome Superstition and Luck
- Type: Private for-profit aviation college
- Established: September 27, 1928; 98 years ago
- President: Rob Polston
- Location: Tulsa, Oklahoma, United States
- Website: spartan.edu

Spartan College of Aeronautics and Technology (Spartan) is a private for-profit aviation college with its main campus in Tulsa, Oklahoma, United States. Satellite campuses are in Inglewood, California, Broomfield, Colorado, and Riverside, California. It was originally established to provide pilot and technicians for Spartan Aircraft Company but outlived its parent company and continues to train pilots and mechanics into the 21st Century. The main campus is adjacent to Tulsa International Airport, with another campus used for flight training at Tulsa Riverside Airport.

In May, 2014 Spartan acquired the Crimson Technical College located in Inglewood, California. Crimson Technical College was founded in 1930, originally called The California Flyers, Inc. and eventually became the Northrop University. On March 31, 2015, this campus took on the Spartan College of Aeronautics and Technology name and added a branch located in Riverside, CA. In April 2016, Spartan also acquired Redstone College in Broomfield, Colorado. Redstone College took the Spartan College name in March 2017.

== History ==
William G. Skelly, a Tulsa oilman and owner of Spartan Aircraft Company, founded the Spartan School in 1928. Initially, the purpose of the school was to promote sales of aircraft manufactured by the company. The school was located initially across Apache Street from Tulsa International Airport.

During the early 1930s, Skelly pledged his share of Spartan Aircraft Company as collateral for a loan from J. Paul Getty, but Skelly's finances became overextended during the Great Depression. As a result, Getty obtained control of Spartan Aircraft, including the Spartan School in 1935. In 1942, Getty personally took over management of Spartan Aircraft and its school.

The Spartan School was activated as a U. S. Army Air Corps (USAAC) facility on August 1, 1939, as an advanced civilian pilot training school to supplement the Air Corps' few flying training schools. The Air Corps supplied students with training aircraft, flying clothes, textbooks, and equipment. The Air Corps also put a detachment at each school to supervise training. Flying training was performed with Fairchild PT-19s as the primary trainer. The Air Force also supplied several PT-17 Stearmans and a few P-40 Warhawks. Spartan furnished instructors, training sites and facilities, aircraft maintenance, quarters, and mess halls.

Students from the Royal Air Force entered the school on June 7, 1941. The U. S. Army Air Forces officially designated Spartan as a British Refresher School.

In 1943, the school reorganized into a College of Aeronautical Engineering, School of Flight, School of Mechanics, School of Meteorology, School of Communications, and School of Instruments. In November 1943, the school was selected by the Department of State and the Civil Aeronautics Administration as a training facility for the Inter-American Aviation Mechanic Training program. The first class under this program included 67 students from 12 Latin American countries.

Spartan Aircraft Company reorganized after World War II, renaming itself as Spartan Aero Repair in 1946. It ceased to produce aircraft, though it continued to operate the school. For the next 15 years the parent company made Spartan Trailers instead of aircraft. It closed the Tulsa manufacturing plant in 1961 and renamed Minnehoma Insurance Company. The Spartan tradename was sold to the Spartan School. In 1967, the former Spartan interests were bought by Automation Industries, Inc., who sold them to National Education Corporation, the parent company of National Education Center, Inc. in 1972.

In 1997, National Education Corporation became a subsidiary of Harcourt General Corporation.

In 2004, Spartan School of Aeronautics changed its name to Spartan College of Aeronautics and Technology to represent its current offering of college degree programs and technology diversity.

Spartan Aviation Industries, Inc. was formed in 2005 by Spartan's management team and was purchased from Harcourt General Corporation.

In 2013, Spartan Education Industries Inc, was formed and acquired the college from Spartan Aviation Industries, Inc.

In 2014, Spartan acquired the Crimson Technical Institute, an Airframe & Powerplant focused college located in Inglewood, California. The Crimson Technical College was founded in 1930 as The California Flyers Inc. and eventually became Northrop University and then Northrop Rice Aviation Institute of Technology (NRAIT).

On March 31, 2015, Crimson Technical College became an additional campus location of Spartan College of Aeronautics and Technology. In April 2016, Spartan College acquired Redstone College in Broomfield, Colorado.

On May 2, 2025, dean of student affairs Cameisha Denise Clark was shot in an act of workplace violence at the Inglewood campus, and died from her injuries the following Monday.

== Locations ==
Spartan College of Aeronautics and Technology has a total of five locations:

- Tulsa Technology Location: Located near the Tulsa International Airport. The location focuses on Aviation Maintenance Technology, Quality Control Management, Hybrid Aviation Maintenance Technology, Aviation Electronics Technology, Nondestructive Testing Technology, as well as the Bachelor of Science in Technology Management degree completion program.
- Tulsa Flight Location: Located on the R.L. Jones Riverside Airport in south Tulsa. This location offers Spartan's Aviation Flight program as well as contract and military training programs.
- Inland Empire Location: Located on the historic Flabob Airport in Riverside, California. This campus focuses on Aviation Maintenance Technology as well as Airframe & Powerplant programs.
- Los Angeles Location: Located approximately two miles from Los Angeles International Airport. The location offers programs in Airframe & Powerplant and Aviation Maintenance Technology.
- Denver Location: Located in Broomfield, Colorado. The location offers programs in Aviation Maintenance Technology and Aviation Electronics Technology.

== Academics ==
Spartan College offers diplomas, associate of applied science degrees, associate of occupational studies degree, and Bachelor of Science degree completion program in Technology Management. It also offers aviation training, certifications, and ratings.

=== Accreditation ===
The Tulsa Campus is accredited by the Accrediting Commission of Career Schools and Colleges (ACCSC) and licensed by the Oklahoma Board of Private Vocational Schools (OBPVS).

The Denver Campus is accredited by the Accrediting Commission of Career Schools and Colleges (ACCSC) and licensed and approved to operate by Colorado Department of Higher Education Division of Private Occupational Schools (DPOS).

The Los Angeles Campus is accredited by the Council on Occupational Education and the Inland Empire Location is a branch of the Los Angeles Campus.

== Notable alumni ==
- Louis F. Burns, American Tribal Historian
- Robert Dwayne Gruss, Roman Catholic bishop
- Gail Halvorsen, Berlin Candy Bomber, United States Air Force
- John Harris (Alaska politician), Alaska Politician
- Payne Jennings, Jr., United States Air Force
- Tex Johnston, Test pilot
- Robin Olds, Triple Ace, United States Air Force
- Mary Riddle, second Native American woman to earn a pilot's license
- Leon Vance, Medal of Honor Recipient
