= Batya Weinbaum =

American feminist

- Born: Betty Susan Weinbaum; February 2, 1952; Ann Arbor, Michigan, U.S.
- Died: June 8, 2026 (aged 74)
- Education: Hampshire College; SUNY Buffalo; University of Massachusetts Amherst (PhD)

Batya Weinbaum (born Betty Susan Weinbaum, February 2, 1952 – June, 8, 2026) is an American poet, feminist, artist, editor, and professor. She founded the Femspec Journal, and has published 17 books as well as over 500 articles, essays, poems, reviews, and pieces of short fiction in various publications.

== Biography ==
Weinbaum was born February 2, 1952, in Ann Arbor, Michigan and spent her childhood in Terre Haute, Indiana. Her parents, Barbara Adele Hyman and Jack Gerald Weinbaum, were active in the civil rights movement. Died June 8, 2026

Weinbaum attended Kingswood School Cranbook where she discovered art. She then graduated from Hampshire College, achieved a Masters from SUNY Buffalo and gained her PhD from Umass Amherst. She travelled in South America as a photographer before returning to the U.S..

== Writing career ==
In the late 1970s, Weinbaum published feminist articles in political journals. These included "The Other Side of the Paycheck: Monopoly Capital and the Structure of Consumption," co-authored with Amy Bridges in Monthly Review, "Women in the Transition to Socialism: Perspectives on the Chinese Case," in Review of Radical Political Economics, 1976 and "Redefining the Question of Revolution," also in Review of Radical Political Economics, 1977.

In 1984, Weinbaum briefly stayed at a commune known as Twin Oaks. Her essay on this experience became a chapter in Rudy Rohrlich and Elaine Hoffman Baruch's book, Women in Search of Utopia: Mavericks and Mythmakers. In the early and mid-80s, she attended the Michigan Women's Music Festival and worked on the crew. She wrote the proposal that founded the alternative healing space, Oasis, with Kristi Vogel.

In 1997, Weinbaum founded a feminist journal, Femspec, an interdisciplinary journal dedicated to science fiction, fantasy, magic realism, surrealism, myth, folklore and other supernatural genres. She was the journal’s editor-in-chief.

From 2013-2020 she conducted a feminist art installation project on Isla Mujeres, Mexico.

In 2014, she bought land in Floyd, Virginia, where she developed a feminist educational retreat.

After working in Carpinteria at the Pacifica Graduate Institute she wrote a column on transformational palmistry for the Santa Barbara Independent and subsequently published two books based on this column called Opening Palms, and On the Palmist's Road.

== Academic career ==
From 1984 to 1986, Weinbaum taught courses with Dr. Liz Kennedy at SUNY Buffalo. Her association with Kennedy helped to direct her multicultural approach in academia.

From 1998 to 2003 Weinbaum taught at Cleveland State University, teaching courses in multicultural literature and other arts, including theater, poetry and performance art. From 2003 to 2007, she taught speech and debate as well as organizing literary events including Beat cafes and Victorian parlors in Cleveland Heights, Ohio.

She was also a visiting faculty and curriculum adviser at Pacifica Graduate Institute from 2006 to 2007. This led to a teaching career based on distance learning with a variety of institutions including East Carolina University, Gaia University, Ivy Bridge College of Tiffin University, State University of New York's Empire State College Center for Distance Learning and, in 2023, the American Public University.

In 2019, Weinbaum was invited to teach Women and Gender Studies at Virginia Tech.

== Critical reception ==
Choice reviewer S. A. Inness praised Islands of Women and Amazons: Representations and Realities as "especially comprehensive" and found Weinbaum's approach to be "engaging and carefully researched." Utopian Studies contributor Linda L. Kick added, "While Weinbaum admits to having explored only a portion of available literature and cultural practices, readers of her book will be amazed by, and grateful for, the breadth and promise of her interdisciplinary scholarship."

== Family ==
Weinbaum has one daughter, Ola.

== Published works ==
=== Books ===
- Curious Courtship of Women's Liberation and Socialism, South End Press, 1978, ISBN 9780896080461
- El Curioso Noviazgo Entre Feminismo y Socialismo. Madrid: Siglo XXI. 1983
- Island of Floating Women, Clothespin Fever Press, 1994, ISBN 9781878533104
- Pictures of Patriarchy, South End Press, 1999, ISBN 9780896081611
- Islands of Women and Amazons: Representations and Realities, University of Texas Press, 2000, ISBN 9780292791275
- Nightmares of Sasha Weitzwoman, Femspec Books, 2010, ISBN 9780983279303
- This Could Happen to You: Post 9-11 Memoir. Femspec Books. 2012
- Feminist Voices. Seattle: Aqueduct. 2013
- Islands of Women and Amazons: Representations and Realities. Second Edition. 2017

=== Edited journal issues ===
- 1998–present. Femspec, Vol.1.1-25.1. 25.2 is in production.

=== Edited books ===
- Mercer, Naomi, Toward Utopia: Feminist Dystopian Writing and Religious Fundamentalism in Margaret Atwood's The Handmaid's Tale, Louise Marley's The Terrorists of Irustan, and Marge Piercy's He, She and It, Femspec Books and Productions, 2015
- IX Chel Press, Issues 1-3, Isla Mujeres

=== Other writings ===
According to Gale Contemporary Authors (2009) additional books and other writings have included:

- Jerusalem Romance, East Coast Editions (Longmeadow, NY), 1993.
- Fragments of Motherhood (includes prose), Angel Fish Press (East Montpelier, VT), 1996
- Mexico in Motion: Actions and Images, Angel Fish Press, 1997
- Searching for Peace on Hostile Grounds: Interviewing Grassroots Women in Israel, 1989-1999 (2003)
- Sasha's Harlem (novel; part one of trilogy), Pyx Press 2004.

=== Poetry ===
Weinbaum has contributed poetry to various periodicals and anthologies.

== Biographical and critical sources ==
- Lambda Book Report, January–February 1994, Judith Katz, review of The Island of Floating Women, p. 36.
- Choice, July 2000, S. A. Inness, review of Islands of Women and Amazons: Representations and Realities, p. 223.
- Cleveland Plain Dealer, October 8, 2000, Zina Vishnevsky, Seeking Zena's Sisters in Legend of Amazons.
- Off Our Backs, August–September 1979, interview with Weinbaum, p. 22; October 2000, Carol Anne Douglas, review of Islands of Women and Amazons, p. 16.
- Utopian Studies Journal, Volume 11, number 2, 2000, Linda L. Kick, review of Islands of Women and Amazons, pp. 305–307.
- Journal of Research on Mothering, Spring, 2002, Gail M. Lindsay, review of Islands of Women and Amazons.
- Women and Politics, Volume 2, numbers 1-2, Annette M. Bickel, review of The Curious Courtship of Women's Liberation and Socialism, p. 145
