= Bryman College =

US for-profit college system (1960–2014)

Bryman College was a system of for-profit colleges in the United States. Bryman College became Everest College in April 2007 and returned to the Bryman name after BioHealth Colleges purchased the San Jose, Hayward, San Francisco and Los Angeles-Wilshire locations.

On July 25, 2014 (12 years ago), the school ceased operations after filing for Chapter 11 bankruptcy and officially shut down all of its campuses.

== History and locations ==
The original Bryman Schools were founded in 1960 (66 years ago) by Mrs. Esther Bryman as the Los Angeles Colleges of Medical and Dental Assistants. In 1975, The Bryman Schools were acquired by the National Education Corporation. In 1983, the school names were changed to National Education Center Bryman Campus. Corinthian Schools, Inc. acquired the schools in July 1995. In June 1996, the school name was changed to Bryman College. Corinthian Schools acquired the San Bernardino campus in 1982, the San Jose Campus in 1996, and the City of Industry, Ontario and West Los Angeles campuses in 2000.

Although the original Bryman school was opened in 1960, several of the campuses that have been acquired have founding dates that are much older, with one campus dating its founding to 1907.

=== Campuses briefs: locations and histories ===
- Alhambra, CA: The Alhambra campus originally opened in Rosemead in 1968 and moved to its current location in May 2004.
- Anaheim, CA: The Anaheim campus originally opened in 1969. In July 1994, the school moved to the city of Orange. The school moved back to Anaheim in December 1999.
- City of Industry, CA: The City of Industry campus, previously known as “Whittier College of Technology” has been in existence since 1969. It was acquired by Educorp, Inc. in 1988 and in 1990 was renamed Nova Institute of Health Technology. Corinthian Colleges, Inc. acquired the College in October 2000 and its name was changed to Bryman College. In 1994, the College was granted approval as a degree granting institution by the Bureau for Private Postsecondary and Vocational Education under California Education Code Section §94310, and moved to its current facility. This campus is a branch campus of the National Institute of Technology in Long Beach, California. The College moved to its current location in 2004.
- Everett, WA: The Everett campus was originally Eton Technical Institute. The history of Eton Technical Institute began in 1962 with Bremerton Business College when it was acquired by George C. and Lois Aloha Bates, who owned and operated the school until their retirement in 1985. In 1985, Mr. Joseph W. Edmonds acquired Bremerton Business College and took the trade name (doing business as) Eton Business College. In July 1985, Eton Business College opened a campus in Seattle. The following June 1986, Puget Sound Institute of Technology was acquired with extensions in Everett, Federal Way, and Seattle. Soon after, in 1986, the main campus of Eton moved to new facilities in Port Orchard where the school spent its first 64 years. In July 1986, Travel Central was purchased. In September 1986, the second campus opened in Federal Way. In May 1987, the third campus opened in Everett. The name of the College was later changed to Eton Technical Institute in 1987. Eton Technical Institute was then purchased by Career Choices, Inc. in late 1999, and became Eton Educational, Inc. doing business as (DBA) Eton Technical Institute. In 2000, Eton's Everett campus moved to its spacious facility in the Everett Mall Office Park. Eton Technical Institute opened its fourth campus in Tacoma in 2003.
- Gardena, CA: The Gardena campus was founded in 1968. In February 1998, the College relocated to its present location. The College is located in the Gardena Medical Plaza, which is a multi-story building with a contemporary marble lobby with an open atrium to the second floor.
- Hayward, CA: The Hayward campus originally opened in 1970 in San Jose. In 1989, a branch of this facility opened in New Orleans. The College moved to a new location in San Jose in January 1998 and moved into its current location in Hayward in September 2001. It closed in July 2014.
- L.A. Wilshire, CA: The Los Angeles campus is the original Bryman campus that opened in 1960.
- Lynnwood, WA
- Ontario, CA: The Ontario campus was founded in 1986 as American Academy for Career Education, and was renamed Nova Institute of Health Technology and was acquired in 1991 by LaLa Educorp, Inc. Corinthian Colleges acquired the Institute in October 2000 and its name was then changed to Bryman College. In January 2005 the College moved to a modern business park in Ontario near the Ontario International Airport.
- Bremerton, WA: The Port Orchard campus was originally Eton Technical Institute. The history of Eton Technical Institute began in 1962 with Bremerton Business College when it was acquired by George C. and Lois Aloha Bates, who owned and operated the school until their retirement in 1985. In 1985, Mr. Joseph W. Edmonds acquired Bremerton Business College and took the trade name (doing business as) Eton Business College. In July 1985, Eton Business College opened a campus in Seattle. The following June 1986, Puget Sound Institute of Technology was acquired with extensions in Everett, Federal Way, and Seattle.
- Renton, WA
- Reseda, CA: The campus in Canoga Park first opened in 1970. In 1988, the city of Canoga Park reorganized its postal boundaries, and the College's address became Winnetka. The College moved to its present Reseda address in August 1998.
- San Bernardino, CA: The San Bernardino campus is the oldest private business college in San Bernardino County and has been in continuous operation since 1907. The College was founded by George and Mabel Longmire and operated under the name of Longmire's Business College until 1945, when it was purchased by Jack and Mary Skadron and renamed to Skadron College of Business. National Education Corporation acquired the college in 1982. In 1983, the name of the college was changed to National Education Center - Skadron College of Business Campus. The college was acquired by Corinthian Schools, Inc. in July 1995. The college name was later changed to Bryman College. The College achieved Associates of Arts degree granting status in January 2003.
- San Francisco, CA: The San Francisco campus began offering classes in 1970. The College moved to its current location in July 1998.
- San Jose North, CA: The San Jose campus was founded in December 1970 as Andon College, a vocational postsecondary education center in the allied health field. Concorde Career Colleges, Inc. purchased the College in May 1984, at which time the name was changed to Clayton Career College. In response to continued growth the school relocated to expanded facilities in 1989. At that time, the school’s name was changed to Concorde Career Institute. Corinthian Schools, Inc. acquired the school in August 1996, and the school name was changed to Bryman College. In February 1997, the College moved to its current location. The College expanded its facilities with the acquisition of additional space in September 2001. The College is located on the west side of San Jose.
- SeaTac, WA:
- St. Louis, MO: The St Louis campus opened in early 2005 and is the first Bryman College to open its doors in the state of Missouri. The St Louis campus is a branch of the Port Orchard campus, which is located in Washington. The main campus in Port Orchard, formerly known as Eton, was founded in 1922 by W.B. Barger, and established as Bremerton Business College to serve the Bremerton and Kitsap Peninsula areas of the State of Washington. The main campus of Eton moved to new facilities in Port Orchard in 1986. In 1987 the branch campus in Everett was opened, and in 2003 the Tacoma campus was opened. In 2003 Corinthian Colleges acquired Career Choices, Inc. and its wholly owned subsidiary Eton Education, Inc.
- Tacoma, WA: The Tacoma campus was originally Eton Technical Institute. The history of Eton Technical Institute began in 1962 with Bremerton Business College when it was acquired by George C. and Lois Aloha Bates, who owned and operated the school until their retirement in 1985. In 1985, Mr. Joseph W. Edmonds acquired Bremerton Business College and took the trade name (doing business as) Eton Business College. In July 1985, Eton Business College opened a campus in Seattle. The following June 1986, Puget Sound Institute of Technology was acquired with extensions in Everett, Federal Way, and Seattle.
- Torrance, CA: Bryman College in Torrance was founded in 1994 as Harbor Medical College for the purpose of providing high-quality, entry-level training designed to help meet the needs of the medical community. The College’s first class in Electronic Medical Claims Processing began in September of that year. Corinthian Schools, Inc. purchased the College in January 2000. In July 2002, the College name was changed to Bryman College.
- West Los Angeles: The West Los Angeles campus was founded in 1987 as a branch of Educorp Career College. The school became a freestanding institution in 1990. Corinthian Colleges, Inc. acquired the Institute in October 2000, and its name was changed to Bryman College.

== Controversies ==
=== Washington ===
In April 2005 the college was sued by some of its students at the Tacoma, Washington campus who claimed they did not receive proper training for their careers in medical assistant program, that they were misled about the program’s accreditation status, their eligibility to take a national certification exam, the transferability of their credits and the availability of internships.

=== Settlement with State of California, 2007 ===
In July 2007, the California Attorney General threatened to file suit against Corinthian Colleges, corporate parent of National Institute of Technology, unless it settled allegations that it has misrepresented its placement statistics; the school had been under investigation by the state attorney general's office for over 18 months. According to a case filed in Los Angeles County Superior Court, Corinthian Colleges "engaged in a persistent pattern of unlawful conduct" by overstating the percentage of those who obtained employment from its courses, inflated information on starting salaries and made misleading or false statements about which programs it was authorized to offer and which were approved by the California Department of Education. The suit stated that Corinthian's "own records show that a substantial percentage of students do not complete the programs and, of those who complete the program, a large majority do not successfully obtain employment within six months after completing the course." In late July, Corinthian Colleges agreed to pay $6.5 million to settle a lawsuit alleging that the chain engaged in unlawful business practices by exaggerating its record of placing students in well-paying jobs; the amount included $5.8 million in restitution to students as well as $500,000 in civil damages and $200,000 in court costs.

== Financial issues ==
In July 2014, Bryman shut down its four schools in the San Francisco Bay Area.
