= The Red (film) =

- Theatrical release poster
- Starring: Amy Northup; Marisa Parry; Drew Lewis; Philip Chorba; Jean Liuzzi; Adam Byrd; Laura Peterson
- Edited by: Andrew Marcus
- Music by: Stenfert Charles
- Production companies: Borderline Films; SS+K
- Distributed by: Hollywood Branding International
- Release date: May 2, 2013
- Country: United States
- Language: English

The Red is an 8-minute psychological thriller created by Borderline Films (makers of Martha Marcy May Marlene and Simon Killer) and advertising agency SS+K on behalf of SALT, a free resource created by the non-profit American Student Assistance.

The Red is aimed towards making college students and recent graduates aware of their student loans and the inescapable anxiety and dread that it creates. The film is part of a sustained, multi-media campaign created to compel and empower young people to take control of their debt on a practical, day-to-day level.

The Red, distributed to theaters by Hollywood Branding International, premiered on May 2, 2013, in five major cities: Boston, Washington, D.C., Chicago, Seattle, and Tampa Bay. Entertainment Nation, a division of Hollywood Branding International, hosted VIP film premiere events in conjunction with the theatrical broadcast in each city. The entire film short is now streaming online at FaceTheRed.com.

== Cast ==
- Amy Northup as Kate
- Marisa Parry as Clara
- Drew Lewis as Charlie
- Phillip Chorba as Boss
- Jean Liuzzi as Teller
- Adam Byrd as ATM Man
- Laura Peterson as Waitress
- Tommy Maher as himself

== Production credits ==
Station Film Presents A Borderline Film The Red starring Amy Northup And Marisa Parry Directed By Borderline Films Edited By Andrew Marcus Music by Stenfert Charles Director Of Photography Joe Anderson Special Effects By MPC Art Directed, Written And Produced By SS+K.
