= National Institute of Technology (United States) =

System of for-profit colleges in the United States

- Other name: Everest Institute
- Type: For-profit
- Parent institution: Corinthian Colleges International, Inc
- Website: Official website

National Institute of Technology (NIT) was Everest Institute, a system of for-profit colleges offering career training across several program areas. The Long Beach, California campus was WyoTech, a for-profit college offering education within the automotive, HVAC, and plumbing industries. The schools were owned by Corinthian Colleges, Inc.

== Controversy ==
In July 2007, the California Attorney General threatened to file suit against Corinthian Colleges, corporate parent of National Institute of Technology, unless it settled allegations that it has misrepresented its placement statistics; the school had been under investigation by the state attorney general's office for over 18 months. According to a case filed in Los Angeles County Superior Court, Corinthian Colleges "engaged in a persistent pattern of unlawful conduct" by overstating the percentage of those who obtained employment from its courses, inflated information on starting salaries and made misleading or false statements about which programs it was authorized to offer and which were approved by the California Department of Education. The suit stated that Corinthian's "own records show that a substantial percentage of students do not complete the programs and, of those who complete the program, a large majority do not successfully obtain employment within six months after completing the course." In late July, Corinthian Colleges agreed to pay $6.5 million to settle a lawsuit alleging that the chain engaged in unlawful business practices by exaggerating its record of placing students in well-paying jobs; the amount included $5.8 million in restitution to students as well as $500,000 in civil damages and $200,000 in court costs.
