= Las Vegas College =

Coordinates: 36.0676°N 115.2753°W

Las Vegas College is a private career college located in Las Vegas, Nevada. It is accredited by the Accrediting Commission of Career Schools and Colleges (ACCSC) and licensed by the Nevada Commission on Postsecondary Education. The college is operated by Nevada Career Education, Inc.

== History ==
Las Vegas College was founded by Betty Krolak in 1979 in Las Vegas under the name Krolak Business Institute. Barbara A. and E.T. Paulus purchased the Institute in December 1980 and incorporated it under the name of TO-Ba Corporation.

On January 7, 1986, the Institute was licensed to offer associate degrees and changed its name to Las Vegas Business College. It was acquired by Rhodes Colleges, Inc., a division of Corinthian Colleges, Inc., on October 17, 1996, at which time the name was changed to Las Vegas College.

In 2003, the school opened a branch campus in Henderson, Nevada. In 2005, the main campus relocated to the Henderson branch. On August 10, 2009, Las Vegas College became Everest College.

In February 2015, Zenith Education Group purchased the school from Corinthian Colleges. In August 2017, Everest College changed its name to Altierus Career College.

In November 2018, Nevada Career Education, Inc. purchased the school and restored the name Las Vegas College.

== Accreditation ==
Las Vegas College is accredited by the Accrediting Commission of Career Schools and Colleges (ACCSC) and licensed by the Nevada Commission on Postsecondary Education. The Associate of Applied Science Degree in Nursing and the Practical Nurse program are accredited by the Accreditation Commission for Education in Nursing (ACEN). The college is also approved for the training of veterans and eligible persons under Title 38 of the United States Code.
