= Oliver Gagliani =

American photographer (1917–2002)

- Born: February 11, 1917; Placerville, California, U.S.
- Died: November 20, 2002 (aged 85); Burlingame, California, U.S.
- Burial place: Holy Cross Cemetery (Colma, California)
- Education: Heald College; California College of Arts and Crafts
- Spouse(s): Laura Marie Frugoli (m. 1948–1981; divorce), Gayle Augusta Mary Anderson (m. 1981–?)

Oliver Lewis Gagliani (1917 – 2002) was an American photographer, and educator. He was a master of large format photography, darkroom technique, and the Zone System. Gagliani was active photographer in the San Francisco Bay Area from 1948 until 2002. He is best known for his beautiful and haunting black-and-white photographs of ghost towns of the southwest.

== Early life ==
Born in Placerville, California on February 11, 1917. He was raised in South San Francisco, California. He intended to become a professional musician and studied the violin for ten years. Gagliani served in the United States Army during World War II, and as a result he sustained hearing loss and was no longer able to pursue music.

== Career ==
Upon seeing a retrospective on Paul Strand's photography work in 1945 at the San Francisco Museum of Art, he was convinced that photography could be considered fine art. He started working as a photographer in 1948. From 1949 until 1958, Gagliani had tuberculosis and periodically spent time in the sanitarium.

From 1951 until 1953, he attended the Heald College of Engineering, in San Francisco.

In 1954, he founded the Bay Street Photographers Gallery in San Francisco. In 1955, Gagliani began experimenting with color photography.

Gagliani earned an MFA degree in Photography from California College of Arts and Crafts in 1973. Oliver studied under and worked with some of the greatest photographers of the 20th century including, Ansel Adams, Minor White, Paul Caponigro, Cole Weston, Paul Strand, Ruth Bernhard. and many others.

He enjoyed sharing his knowledge and in his later years conducted photographic workshops, the Oliver Gagliani Zone System and Fine Print Photography Workshops, in Virginia City, Nevada.

Gagliani died in November 20, 2002 in Burlingame, California. He is buried in Holy Cross Cemetery in Colma, California.
