= Britebound =

American nonprofit organization

Britebound, formerly American Student Assistance (ASA), is a national non-profit organization headquartered in Boston, Massachusetts. It provides free online career exploration tools for middle and high school students and supports career readiness through grantmaking, impact investing, research, and advocacy. The organization adopted the Britebound name in January 2026.

== History ==
American Student Assistance was founded in 1956 under the name Massachusetts Higher Education Assistance Corporation (MHEAC). The organization began when a group of people approached Massachusetts local businesses for philanthropic donations with the idea of creating a pool of money to guarantee loans for higher education. MHEAC went on to become the nation's first student loan guarantor. Its model of a student loan program—funded by local banks and insured by a non-profit organization—was replicated across the country and by 1965, there were 14 loan guarantors in the United States.

In 1990, the United States Department of Education designated MHEAC as the guarantor for Washington, D.C. By 1992, MHEAC had begun to expand its services nationwide, so the organization adopted a trade name of American Student Assistance to reflect that its services were available to U.S. student loan borrowers everywhere.

== Voluntary Flexible Agreement ==
In 2001, ASA became one of four guarantors to enter into a Voluntary Flexible Agreement (VFA) with the US federal government, changing its focus from back-end default collections to an emphasis on delinquency and default prevention. The Voluntary Flexible Agreement enabled Federal Family Education Loan Program guarantors to develop programs and techniques to help borrowers avoid student-loan default and all of its negative consequences. ASA's Wellness program was designed to deliver debt management information to borrowers at critical points along the life of their loan in order to prevent repayment problems before they start.

Results of these Wellness activities proved that the proactive approach to giving student loan borrowers the right information at exactly the right time were effective in preventing repayment problems. According to ASA studies, graduates who received financial literacy and career information from ASA during the first two years of repayment were half as likely to default as those who did not; since 2002, ASA has beaten national Cohort Default Rates (borrowers newly entering repayment) by more than 46 percent, with 95 percent of the loans in its portfolio in good standing, on average; and ASA saved taxpayers approximately $120 million through prevented student loan defaults between fiscal years 2001 and 2008.

All student loan guarantor VFAs were canceled by the U.S. Department of Education in 2008.

== Looking forward ==
In 2010, federal legislation ended privately financed, federally guaranteed education loans under the Federal Family Education Loan Program, in favor of Direct Loans originated directly by the federal government. Therefore, ASA has guaranteed no new education loans since July 1, 2010. The organization continues to fulfill its obligations as a student loan guarantor to the U.S. Department of Education for its remaining FFELP portfolio, which stands at approximately $35 billion and 1.3 million borrowers.

Additionally, in 2012 ASA launched “SALT,” a financial education membership program that teaches students how to borrow less and more wisely for higher education; how to repay student loans successfully; and how to build better overall financial skills in life. ASA's goal with SALT is to revolutionize the way students finance and repay higher education, transforming them from passive financial aid recipients to instead proactive, financially savvy consumers who truly own their student loans and finances.

ASA is often cited as an expert reference on student loans by national and local media.

In February 2020, a $1.5 million grant from American Students Assistance was awarded to Skills for Rhode Island's Future for its PrepareRI internship program. The announcement was given by Gov. Gina Raimondo at a news conference at the Citizens Bank headquarters.

In April 2024, American Student Assistance announced its intention to invest $25 million in mission-aligned funds, companies with diverse founders, and in businesses focused on fostering innovation in career-focused education, postsecondary pathways, and workforce development.

In July 2024, American Student Assistance partnered with Jobs for the Future to create a new center to empower individuals ages 16-24 to navigate education and career pathways after high school by providing access to career resources and opportunities.

The center now operates as the Britebound Center for Career Navigation at JFF.

== Rebrand as Britebound ==
On January 12, 2026, American Student Assistance announced that it had changed its name to Britebound and introduced a new visual identity. Lammers said the former name no longer reflected the organization's work, which had shifted from student loan guarantee services to career exploration and postsecondary pathways for young people.

In February 2026, Britebound announced $13.3 million in grants to nonprofits serving middle and high school students. In March 2026, it spun out TeenVoice, a youth research and insights business developed within the organization, as an independent public benefit corporation led by Joel Idelson. In June 2026, Britebound acquired Lab4U, a Chilean educational technology company that develops smartphone-based science lab tools. Lab4U chief executive Komal Dadlani continued in that role.

== Programs ==
Britebound's free digital tools include GoZig, a career exploration and navigation platform; Futurescape, an online career interest tool; and Future Network, a video series in which professionals discuss their careers.
