= Everest College =

American system of colleges

- Type: Non-profit career school
- Established: 2007; 19 years ago
- Founders: Corinthian Colleges
- Parent institution: Zenith Education Group (Educational Credit Management Corporation)
- Location: United States
- Website: www.everest.edu

Everest College was a system of colleges in the United States, and in conjunction with Wyotech made up Zenith Education. It was until 2015 a system of for-profit colleges in the United States and the Canadian province of Ontario, owned and operated by Corinthian Colleges, Inc.. On July 19, 2017, Zenith Education announced that it would rebrand its Everest campuses as Altierus Career College.

In 2021, former Everest students were made eligible for automatic student loan debt relief through the US Department of Education after several investigations found widespread fraud or misleading statements in recruitment and advertising regarding career prospects and other factors.

== History ==
In 2010, Corinthian Colleges consolidated a number of schools under the Everest brand name. Former schools that became Everest Colleges include: Bryman College, Ashmead College, Florida Metropolitan University, Olympia College, Kee Business College, Parks College, Western Business College, Blair College and Springfield College. In December 2009, Corinthian Colleges, Inc. (CCi) re-branded their campuses as Everest College and sold the remaining campuses. Eminata Group.

In Milwaukee, Wisconsin, where a Corinthian Everest campus was financed with $11 million in city bonds, 25% of students found jobs and over half dropped out; the campus closed in 2012, two years after it opened.

The diplomas issued by Everest College were described as worthless as many graduated students found no job placement, the reputation tainted.

The Ontario government stepped in and shut down 14 Everest College of Business, Health Care and Technology campus locations owned by Corinthian Colleges on February 19, 2015. The next day, Everest College declared bankruptcy.

In February 2015, Educational Credit Management Corporation's subsidiary Zenith Education Group acquired 56 Everest College and WyoTech campuses from Corinthian. Zenith planned to transition the schools from for-profit to nonprofit status. It also planned to eliminate some programs with poor completion and job placement rates. Campuses with little to no revenue along with the 15 Everest campuses in California, which were not acquired by ECMC, closed their doors for good when Corinthian Colleges shuttered all of their remaining campuses on April 27, 2015.

In March 2016, the US Department of Education fired Everest College's monitor, Hogan Marren Babbo & Rose Ltd., implicating several conflicts of interest. The State of California was also awarded $1.1 billion from Corinthian Colleges for false advertising and predatory business practices. The judge ordered restitution of $820 million for students.

A 2016 Associated Press investigation alleged that Everest still recruits through telemarketing, has yet to make significant changes to its shoddy curriculum. Recent graduates also reported being unable to find work that would allow them to pay their student loans.

== Funding ==
Approximately 96% of Everest's funds come from the US government. In 2016, ECMC, Everest's parent company, provided an infusion of capital to keep the schools running.

== Accreditation ==
Accreditation for Everest College varies by country, state and region. Everest College campuses that are regionally accredited are Everest College Phoenix, Everest College Mesa and online courses taught through Everest College Phoenix. All other Everest College campuses are nationally accredited.

Generally, credits from nationally accredited institutions are not transferable to other colleges and universities.

In 2009 Everest College Phoenix was placed on academic probation by its accrediting body over concerns that it did not have enough autonomy and control over on-campus academics and operations from the parent company, Corinthian Colleges, Inc. In September 2010, the North Central Association of Colleges and Schools rejected a recommendation from its evaluation panel that the school's accreditation be revoked outright. In November 2010 the Higher Learning Commission voted to place the campus on a "Show-Cause" status which will require the college to demonstrate to the commission why its accreditation should not be revoked. Everest College Phoenix had until March 2011 to respond to the request and the matter was not expected to be resolved until November 2011. The college remained an accredited institution during this period.

== Locations ==
The National Center for Education Statistics lists the following Everest Colleges and their 2015–2016 enrollments and accreditation status:

- Colorado Springs (CO) – 209 (ACICS)
- Thornton (CO) – 232 (ACICS)
- Orange Park (FL) – 368 (ACICS)
- Tampa (FL) – 375 (ACICS)
- Atlanta-West (GA) – 467 (ACCSC)
- Norcross (GA) – 279 (ACCSC)
- Southfield (MI) – 555 (ACCSC)
- South Plainfield (NJ) – 374 (ACCSC)
- Columbus (OH) – 228 (ACCSC)
- Henderson (NV) – 417 (ACICS)
- Arlington (TX) – 390 (ACICS)
- Fort Worth (TX) – 437 (ACICS)
- Houston-Bissonnet (TX) – 590 (ACCSC)
- Houston-Hobby (TX) – 464 (ACCSC)
- Austin (TX) – 371 (ACCSC)
- San Antonio (TX) – 273 (ACCSC)
- Chesapeake (VA) – 321 (ACICS)
- Woodbridge (VA) – 342 (ACICS)
- Everett (WA) – 278 (ACICS)
- Tacoma (WA) – 278 (ACICS)
- Milwaukee (WI) - 414 (ACCSC)

== Political influence ==
From 2014 to 2016, Podesta Group received at least $580,000 as the major lobbying firm for ECMC Group, Everest College's parent company.

== Legal proceedings ==
=== In the United States ===
Everest was one of 15 for-profit colleges cited by the Government Accountability Office for deceptive or questionable statements that were made to undercover investigators posing as applicants. Two unnamed campuses were cited in this report. Department of Education statistics indicated that Everest College graduates had the highest default rate of any school in California for students entering repayment in 2010 and the fifth highest rate in Arizona.

In September 2010, a group of Everest College graduates sued the school for fraud, alleging deceptive recruitment practices concerning costs of attendance, the value of the degree, and whether credits earned there would transfer to other schools.

In 2012, Everest College in Hayward, California was issued a "Notice to Comply" by the California Bureau for Private Postsecondary Education for multiple violations, including engaging in "prohibited business practices".

=== In Canada ===
In 2014, Everest announced the sale of all 14 locations in Canada after a probe by the parent company over concerns of falsified job placement and grades. In February 2015, Canada's National Association of Career Colleges announced that Everest College's Ontario locations had their operating license suspended by Ministry of Training, Colleges and Universities (Ontario).

On February 19, 2015, Ontario's superintendent of private career colleges, the independent regulator that governs schools like Everest and others in the province, said it has suspended the chain's licence to operate in Ontario as a private college, effective immediately. Former students and teachers claim the college was corrupt and a scam. On February 20, 2015, Everest College Canada filed for Bankruptcy protection.

== Former campuses ==
United States campuses were formerly found in the states of Arizona (2 campuses), California (15), Colorado (2), Georgia (4), Indiana (1), Illinois (5), Missouri (2), Michigan, Nevada (1), Oregon (1), Texas (3), Utah (1), Virginia (3), Washington (5) and Wisconsin (1).

Everest College of Business, Health Care and Technology formerly operated 16 campus locations in Ontario.

Two more campuses (Pittsburgh, PA and Aurora, CO) were closed in 2016.

== Corinthian debt cancellation ==
On June 8, 2015, the Department of Education announced that it was developing a process that would allow former students of Everest (along with other Corinthian schools) to apply for debt relief, if they believed they were victims of fraud. While the department has still not created a formal process, they have provided the outlines of what borrowers should submit if they wish to pursue debt cancellation on the Federal Student Aid website.

In addition, the advocacy group the Debt Collective has created its own, unofficial "Defense to Repayment App" that allows former students of Corinthian and other schools accused of fraud to pursue debt cancellation. The applications generated through the Debt Collective's online form was cited by the Department of Education in a Federal Register notice, which said that "a need for a clearer process for potential claimants" arose due to the submission of over 1000 defense to repayment claims by "a building debt activism movement".
