= Ivybridge Priory =

St Austin's Priory
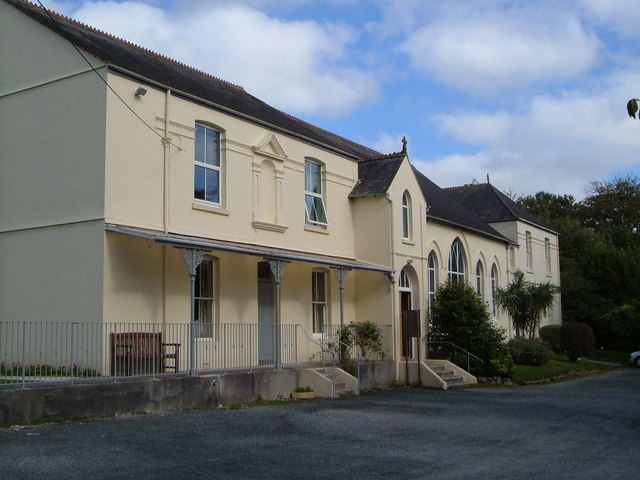
- St Austin's Priory
- 50.390029°N 3.949698°W
- OS grid reference: SX 61503 56279
- Location: Woodland Rd; Cadleigh, Ivybridge, Devon; PL21 9HW
- Country: England
- Denomination: Roman Catholic

History
- Status: Active

Architecture
- Functional status: Parish church

Ivybridge Priory or St. Austin's Priory was a monastic house in Devon, England.

From 1932 it was a priory of the Order of Augustinian Recollects. They relocated to Devon from Spain at this time due to anti-clericalism, purchasing it from the Sisters of the Sacred Hearts of Jesus and Mary, who had themselves taken it on due to earlier anti-clericalism in France, to which by 1932 they were able to return.

During the 20th century, missionaries were educated at the priory. It shrank over the decades, with several buildings being demolished in 1981, and was eventually closed as a monastic house and passed into the hands of the Diocese of Plymouth in 2016.
