= Everest University =

Former University in Florida

Coordinates: 27.9968°N 82.4975°W

Everest University was a private for-profit university based in Florida. From 2015 to 2020, the schools were operated by nonprofit Zenith Education Group, after former for-profit owner Corinthian Colleges shut down its operations. It was founded in 1940 as Fort Lauderdale College of Business and Finance and later known as the Florida Metropolitan University, a name it held until 2010. The Florida-based university offered online courses for students throughout the country. Programs focused on career orientation, offering day, night, weekend and online programs for working adults, with programs and schedules varying by campus.

== History ==
Founded as Fort Lauderdale College of Business and Finance in 1940, the College was renamed Fort Lauderdale College in 1976. Another name change created the Florida Metropolitan University. The three remaining schools are branded as Altierus Career College.

=== Operation by Corinthian Colleges ===
In 2006, an arbitration process ruled in favor of FMU/Everest and a lawsuit regarding transfer of credits dating to 2004 was dismissed.

In August 2007, an investigation of company practices was closed by the State of Florida with no fines, penalties, or finding of wrongdoing. The investigation inquired into FMU's "advertising, marketing and business practices related to the sale of educational services to Florida Residents." The resulting assurance of voluntary compliance between FMU and the Florida Office of the Attorney General indicated that FMU would pay $99,900 to the Office of the Attorney General for its investigation and in contributions to various consumer education purposes. It indicated that FMU would "modify" its pre-enrollment documents to include "Clear and Conspicuous" language regarding credit transfer, its refund policy, and its tuition costs, among other stipulations that, in part, serve to "better train" its teaching personnel to meet certain student needs. The Assurance of Voluntary Compliance found that FMU/Everest participates in the Florida Statewide Course Numbering System to facilitate the transfer of eligible credits to other institutions. Everest University's previous parent company, Corinthian Colleges, is currently being sued by the state of California for "false and predatory advertising, intentional misrepresentations to students, securities fraud and unlawful use of military seals in advertisements."

"According to (California Attorney General) Harris' complaint, CCI's predatory marketing efforts specifically target vulnerable, low-income job seekers and single parents who have annual incomes near the federal poverty line. In internal company documents obtained by the Department of Justice, CCI describes its target demographic as 'isolated,' 'impatient,' individuals with 'low self-esteem,' who have 'few people in their lives who care about them' and who are 'stuck' and 'unable to see and plan well for future.' It is alleged the schools targeted people meeting these targets through aggressive and persistent internet and telemarketing campaigns and through television ads on daytime shows like Jerry Springer and Maury Povich."

In 2012 and 2013, Everest faced site shutdowns as a result of low job placement rates.

In November 2013, Corinthian Colleges reported that they were under investigation by the Consumer Financial Protection Bureau.

=== Operation by Zenith Education ===
In February 2015, ECMC, a non-profit education firm, took ownership of more than half of Corinthian Colleges' campuses. ECMC also agreed to forgive student debt on Corinthian College's Genesis loans after a series of years.

Zenith Education Group, a newly created nonprofit provider of career school training, announced in February 2015 that it had finalized its acquisition of more than 50 Everest and WyoTech campuses from Corinthian Colleges Inc., a transaction that was first announced in November. The deal will allow nearly 30,000 students to pursue their career goals without disruption, and will give those students the opportunity to complete their education under new management that is set to implement a new plan to improve the education of its students.

Everest University was then known as Altierus Career College and Career Education. Their program offerings were limited to associate degrees and career diplomas in Health Care, Trades, Technical, and Business areas.

== Campuses ==
- Houston
- Norcross, Georgia
- Tampa
- Pompano Beach

== Accreditation and credit transfer ==
When it closed, Everest University was not accredited. The Everest University campuses in Florida were accredited by the Accrediting Council for Independent Colleges and Schools (ACICS) to award diplomas, associate, bachelor's and master's degrees. However, in 2016 the United States Secretary of Education denied ACICS's accrediting status for failing to meet 21 recognition criteria.

Everest University participated in Florida's optional credit transfer program, the Florida Statewide Course Numbering System (SCNS). SCNS was established to facilitate the transfer of students and credits between Florida's public postsecondary educational institutions and participating nonpublic educational institutions, such as Everest University. "Courses that have the same academic content and are taught by faculty with comparable credentials are given the same prefix and number, and are considered equivalent courses. Equivalent courses are guaranteed to transfer to any other institution participating in SCNS, and the credit awarded for these equivalent courses will satisfy the receiving institution's institutional requirements on the same basis as credits awarded to native students." All Florida public universities and colleges participate in SCNS as well as numerous career/technical education centers and nonpublic institutions, such as Everest University. On August 24, 2010, Everest University had 709 courses listed on SCNS.
