= Educational Credit Management Corporation =

Educational Credit Management Corporation (ECMC) is a United States nonprofit corporation based in Minnesota. Since 1994, ECMC has operated in the areas of student loan bankruptcy management and loan collection. ECMC is one of a number of guaranty agencies that oversee student loans for the United States Department of Education. As a guarantor working on behalf of the U.S. Department of Education, ECMC charges fees to debtors and earns commissions from taxpayers by collecting on defaulted student loans pursuant to the Higher Education Act. In return, the U.S. government has retrieved billions of dollars from student loan debtors. From 1994 to 2015, according to ECMC, they returned $4.3 billion to the U.S. Treasury.

According to ECMC the company works to reduce student-loan default rates and provide resources to help students repay their loans, and promotes financial literacy and student success in higher education. It provides current and future borrowers with free services, and employs an ombudsman to assist with complaints and disputes, questions, and to clarify processes. It also provides free assistance with financial aid forms to students through college access centers known as The College Place, as well as scholarships to students in the ECMC Scholars program in Oregon, Virginia and Connecticut. In addition, ECMC claims to help minority-serving institutions (MSIs) improve student success and institutional outcomes. One initiative provides aid for students dealing with unforeseen financial emergencies through its affiliate ECMC Foundation.

ECMC Group, the parent company for ECMC, also operates ECMC Education and ECMC Foundation. ECMC Education maintained three campuses under the name Altierus. Its campuses in Tampa, Florida, Atlanta, Georgia, and Houston, Texas focus on career and technical education.

ECMC Foundation, headquartered in Los Angeles, CA, is said to support organizations and institutions that provide programs and support to students from underserved backgrounds.

ECMC has been controversial for its alleged "ruthless" tactics in recovering loans and for the large bonuses it paid its collectors. In 2021, the Consumer Financial Protection Bureau was investigating, alleging that ECMC deliberately made student debtors incur additional fees when their accounts went into debt collection. In 2012, a panel of bankruptcy appeal judges criticized the company for its "waste of judicial resources," and abuse of the bankruptcy process.

== History ==
The company was founded in 1994 in Minnesota.

In March 2010, the company was the target of data theft. The personal information on 3.3 million student-loan borrowers was taken.

In March 2018, ECMC Foundation launched its Education Innovation Ventures portfolio.

In February 2018, ECMC Group moved its headquarters to Minneapolis, MN.

In June 2018, ECMC Foundation funded 10 colleges aiming to increase student persistence and graduation rates among low-income, first-generation students and students of color. In October 2018, ECMC Group invested in Meritize, an education lender for skills-based careers. In October 2018, ECMC Foundation launched the CTE Leadership Collaborative—an initiative focused on bringing together professionals and equipping postsecondary career and technical education (CTE) leaders with the tools, resources and skills needed to advance the field.

In November 2018, ECMC Foundation funded an effort by Education Design Lab focused on single mothers in college.

In December 2018, ECMC opened a college access center in Alexandria, VA.

In March 2019, the group invested in Cluster, Inc., a company focused on the industrial manufacturing workforce.

In November 2019, ECMC Foundation launched the Basic Needs Initiative, which is said to focus on providing grants for organizations focused on basic needs for students.

In January 2020, Zenith changed its name to ECMC Education.

In June 2020, the group launched a public awareness campaign called "Question The Quo" providing information to students about postsecondary education options and released the results of a survey of high school students. In June 2020, the group invested in American Prison Data Systems.

In August 2020, national refrigeration company CoolSys announced a partnership with ECMC Education that is said to be focused on employee training.

In November 2020, ECMC launched an initiative with the State Council of Higher Education for Virginia (SCHEV) aimed to encourage high school students to attend some form of postsecondary education after graduation.

In January 2021, ECMC Group invested in EmpowerU, a student counseling service. In January 2021, ECMC Foundation launched the Catalyzing Transfer Initiative, a grant program said to be focused on student transfer.

In February 2021, New Mexico State University (NMSU) launched a financial literacy platform for its students as part of ECMC's Project Success, which is a three-year project to retain and graduate students at NMSU. In February 2021, ECMC Group released the results of a new survey of high school students. In

In March 2021, ECMC worked with the Virginia College Access Network to launch a program to provide free assistance with the Free Application for Federal Student Aid (FAFSA) for students in Virginia. I > In March 2021, ECMC Foundation launched the Transformational Partnerships Fund, a fund said to be focused on education partnerships.

== Zenith Educational group ==
In 2014, US Representative Steve Cohen from Tennessee said ECMC's purchase of Everest Colleges and Wyotech "raises great questions about their purposes." The Congressman added that "there's a stench that's out there above this whole area, and the merger."

In February 2015, the company's newly created subsidiary Zenith Education Group acquired 56 Everest College and WyoTech campuses from Corinthian Colleges Inc. Zenith transitioned the schools from for-profit to nonprofit status. It also eliminated some programs with poor completion and job placement rates. The deal included the forgiveness of $480 million in loans Corinthian students took out, earning praise from federal agencies and some consumer groups. ECMC Group reported a loss of $100 million for Zenith Education Group in 2015. In 2016, Zenith maintained 24 Everest College and Wyotech campuses, having consolidated, closed or begun teaching out 32 campuses. In 2016, ECMC Group gave $250 million to Zenith to maintain the remaining schools. In September 2017, the remaining schools became Altierus Career College.

In 2016, the Associated Press reported that the remaining colleges continued to recruit students through telemarketing and advertisements on daytime TV talk shows, and had not made substantive changes to its curriculum. A new federal monitor was instituted after it was revealed that there was a conflict of interest between the monitor and ECMC. I

In 2016, ECMC Group gave $250 million to Zenith to maintain the remaining schools. In September 2017, the remaining schools became Altierus Career College. Its campuses in Tampa, Florida, Atlanta, Georgia, and Houston, Texas focus on career and technical education. In November 2018, Altierus Career College launched new programs at its Tampa, FL, location including nursing associate of science, computer information technology and dental assisting. In March 2019, Altierus Career College launched its Refrigeration Technician and Heating, Ventilation and Air Conditioning (HVAC) Technician programs. Other programs offered include, Dental Assistants, Medical Assistant, Pharmacy Technician, Surgical Technologist, Electrical, Nursing, and Medical Coding and Billing.

== Political influence ==
According to OpenSecrets, ECMC Group previously paid Podesta Group $580,000 to lobby for them. The Podesta Group, founded by Tony Podesta and John Podesta was one of the most powerful and influential lobbying firms in Washington, DC. The firm closed in November 2017.

== Controversies ==
In 2012, a panel of bankruptcy appeal judges denounced ECMC for wasting judicial resources, and said its collection activities "constituted an abuse of the bankruptcy process and defiance of the court's authority."

In 2014, Emory professor Rafael Pardo wrote a piece in the University of Florida Law Review that criticized ECMC for its "pollutive litigation" against powerless student loan debtors.

In January 2020, the United States Bankruptcy Court for the Southern District of New York ruled that a debtor with more than $200,000 in student loan debt was entitled to an undue hardship discharge pursuant to 11 U.S.C. sec. 523(a)(8). The guarantor of the student loan debt, ECMC, appealed the decision to the United States District Court for the Southern District of New York, and the appeal is currently pending.
