= Cohort default rate =

A cohort default rate (CDR) is an accountability metric for US colleges that are eligible for federal Pell Grants and student loans. It measures the percentage of a school's borrowers who enter repayment on federal student loans during a federal fiscal year (October 1 to September 30) and default in the next three years. The United States Department of Education (ED) releases official cohort default rates once per year. Schools that have a CDR above 30% for three consecutive years or above 40% for one year lose access to federal student loans and Pell Grants.

The official national three-year cohort default rate for the FY2023 cohort was 0.4%, up from 0.0% for FY2022. The FY2023 calculation covered 3,372,244 borrowers who entered repayment between October 1, 2022 and September 30, 2023, of whom 14,296 were counted as having defaulted within the three-year measurement period. The U.S. Department of Education cautioned that the result was still significantly affected by the federal student-loan payment pause, during which borrowers with Department-held loans did not enter default, so the rate may present an unusually favorable picture of repayment outcomes.

== History of the cohort default rate ==
The cohort default rate was initiated in the late 1980s as a way of drawing attention to institutions that were thought to be preying on low-income students who might have trouble re-paying their loans.

There had been a burst of trade schools in cities with large minority populations and low-income residents who tried to build enrollment by encouraging academically under-qualified students to apply for loans that they would be unlikely to be able to repay, especially if they received a substandard education.

The cohort default rate plan was that institutions with abnormally high default rates would be identified and held accountable for their actions. These institutions would lose access to federal grants and loans after having a cohort default rate that exceeded the national average by 30% for three years, or 40% in one year. The goal was that fraudulent schools would be weeded out and all institutions would be forced to look at student education debt more seriously.

== Problems with the cohort default rate ==
The idea worked at first, as hundreds of illegitimate trade schools closed. However, some college leaders argued that default rate provisions were endangering legitimate colleges that served low-income students who needed loans to pay for their education.

Other criticisms have been raised as well. The cohort default rate only tracks a portion of borrowers –- those who default within the first three years of repayment. The short monitoring period can make the measure vulnerable to manipulation by schools. In 2018, the GAO, a government watchdog, found that schools may use tactics to delay their students' default. Some schools hired third-party companies to encourage borrowers to put their loans into forbearance (which pause required payments) during the first three years of repayment. While these forbearances did not prevent defaults, they ensured many borrowers' defaulted on their loans after the three-year period monitored in the cohort default rate.

The cohort default rate has also become less effective at holding schools accountable now that many borrowers repay their loans through an income-driven repayment plan. These plans make monthly payments more affordable for low-income borrowers, which helps borrowers but makes default a less effective proxy for school outcomes. The cohort default rate became even less effective when student loan payments were paused for almost all federal borrowers because of the COVID-19 pandemic.

As a result, only a handful of schools have cohort default rates high enough to warrant sanctions each year. In 2016, only 10 schools had a CDR high enough for sanctions, out of over 4,000 schools that are subject to the CDR rules. Eight of these schools were able to successfully appeal the sanctions, so only 2 schools faced consequences. Think tanks such as Third Way and the Brookings Institution have suggested that the CDR needs to be supplemented with an accountability system that is better able to hold schools accountable for poor student outcomes.

== Changes ==
Changes have been made to address certain criticisms. In 1998, the United States Congress decided to extend the amount of time (from 180 to 270 days) before loans were considered to be in default. Additionally, it takes the government 90 days to pay the insurance claim. That means it takes roughly a full year for a loan to be considered in default, and that's not including the 6-month grace period before repayment begins.

Then, starting in 2005, Congress began advising colleges to compare the Department of Education's cohort default rates for their schools with their own records in order to ensure consistency. Schools that find inconsistencies between cohort-default-rate data and their own can challenge the Department of Education's findings.

== Default Prevention Initiatives ==
Several new initiatives have arisen to combat high student loan default rates, including an outreach effort by the Department of Education to borrowers struggling to repay their loans.

== See also ==
- Student loan default in the United States
- Voluntary Flexible Agreement
