= Business college =

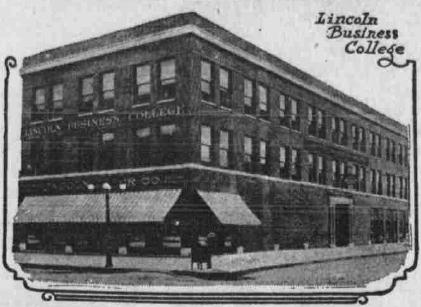
Lincoln Business College in Lincoln, Nebraska in 1915.

A business college in United States history generally refers to non-degree granting for-profit proprietary colleges to train students "for work in the emerging white collar world of industrial capitalism", emerging in the mid-19th century and growing into the 20th century.

== Overview ==
It is a school that provides education above the high school level but could not be compared to that of a traditional university or college. Unlike universities and even junior and community colleges, business colleges typically trains a student for a specific vocational aspect, usually clerical tasks such as typing, stenography or simple bookkeeping. These schools developed decades before the first "business schools" attached to a college started, such as the Wharton School in 1881.

The goal of a business college is not to provide a thorough education, as is the model of modern universities in the liberal arts fields, but rather to provide training for a very specific task, such as legal terms, marketing, strategy, planning, Human resources, management information systems, finance, or negotiation. Academic credits earned at a business college generally do not transfer to other colleges or universities and students cannot earn a bachelor's degree, though an associate degree may be offered. Business Colleges do offer degrees in business administration and management. These are typically offered through a 1-2 year program.

In recent decades the number of these institutions has been declining, see, e.g., Brown Mackie College, as business colleges have been finding more competition coming from community colleges, which provide both vocational as well as liberal arts classes and are often able to offer the classes at a lower rate of tuition, as they are usually nonprofit and subsidized by one or more levels of government assistance.

In the US, business colleges are sometimes also called proprietary colleges, especially when they grant associate degrees or higher.

== Not MBA school ==
Business colleges should not be confused with business schools which typically offer a Master of Business Administration (MBA) program after a student has completed a bachelor's degree. MBA programs typically take two academic years to complete.

== See also ==
- Bryant & Stratton College
- Brown's Business College - Chain of midwestern United States business colleges started in 1870s
- Eastman Business College
- Business and Enterprise College, a type of specialist school in England
