= WyoTech =

Technical college in Laramie, Wyoming, U.S.

Coordinates: 41°18′12.83″N 105°37′15.46″W

- Other name: Wyoming Technical Institute
- Motto: Know Your Brand. Forge Your Path.
- Type: Private for-profit technical college
- Established: 1966; 60 years ago
- Location: Laramie, Wyoming, United States
- Website: www.wyotech.edu

WyoTech, Wyoming Technical Institute, is a private for-profit technical college in Laramie, Wyoming, United States. It was founded in 1966. WyoTech provides 3 core programs and 6 specialty programs which prepare students for careers as technicians in the automotive and diesel industry.

In July 2018, WyoTech was purchased from Zenith Education Group by a team of Wyoming locals, including former WyoTech president, Jim Mathis.

As of November 2018, the Laramie campus is the only location where classes are available.

== History ==
=== Founding ===
WyoTech was founded in 1966 as an automotive-themed school, offering programs in automotive repair. The first class in Laramie had 22 students, and its classes were housed in a 9,000 square foot building.

=== Purchase and growth ===
Corinthian Colleges purchased Wyo-tech Acquisition Corporation on July 1, 2002, for $84.4 million in cash, which was 9.5 times EBITDA. At that point, there were two WyoTech campuses: One in Laramie, Wyoming, and a facility being constructed in Blairsville, Pennsylvania. The cohort default rate for WyoTech was 7.2 in 1998 and 5.0% in 1999.

By August 2004, WyoTech had seven sites, adding campuses in Boston (August 2003), Fremont, California (August 2003), Sacramento (January 2004), Oakland (March 2004), and Daytona Beach (August 2004). The Daytona campus offered programs to prepare students for jobs as motorcycle, marine, and personal watercraft technicians.

As of July 2018, the only operating WyoTech campus is located in Laramie, Wyoming. November 19, 2022, WyoTech added a 90,000 square feet expansion.

=== WyoTech downsizing and Corinthian Colleges failure ===
In 2007 and 2008, WyoTech divested from its Boston and Oakland campuses, which offered aviation maintenance. The Boston campus was sold in 2008 and the Oakland campus was expected to be sold in 2009.

In 2011, WyoTech reported that its schools had some of the highest graduation rates of any two-year schools in the United States. WyoTech Blairsville had a graduation rate of 85.1 percent, and WyoTech Laramie a graduation rate of 80.1 percent. However, WyoTech's student loan default rates had risen to 16.8% at the Blairsville campus and 17.2% at the Laramie campus. A 2011 report by California Watch found that student loan default rates in 2009 were an alarming 27.4% at Long Beach and 24.6% in Fremont.

In its 2011 investigation and 2012 report, The Senate Committee on Health, Education, Labor, and Pensions also highlighted Corinthian Colleges, WyoTech's parent company, as a predatory corporation that misled students about costs and gainful employment. In HELP documents, the committee noted that the Long Beach WyoTech had a student loan default rate of 36.6%.

From July 2011 to July 2014, Corinthian Colleges loaned students funds with its high interest in-house Genesis Loans.

In 2012, WyoTech divested from its campuses in Sacramento and Daytona Beach. It also reported that its trademarks had been impaired by regulatory uncertainties surrounding gainful employment. In 2013, WyoTech partnered with Mack Trucks and Volvo Trucks to create a curriculum for the new Diesel Advanced Technology Education for Mack Trucks and Volvo Trucks. However, WyoTech schools faced layoffs and site closings as Corinthian Colleges, its parent company, received greater government scrutiny for its questionable business and trading practices. One of the major criticisms of WyoTech and other for-profit colleges was that tuition was typically 300% to 400% more expensive than programs at community colleges, which triggered higher student loan default rates. Due to a lack of acceptable offers to buy the Daytona Beach campus, WyoTech continued operations there.

In a 2014 expose, the Center for Investigative Reporting found that three of WyoTechs' California campuses received more than $32 million in GI Bill funds during a 5-year span. WyoTech was labeled as a subprime college because its parent company, Corinthian Colleges, had used false and misleading advertising to recruit students.

=== ECMC purchase ===
In February 2015, Educational Credit Management Corporation (ECMC) bought three WyoTech campuses and the remaining Everest College campuses under the name Zenith Education Group.

On April 27, 2015, Zenith Education Group closed its three WyoTech campuses in California, leaving the campuses in Laramie, Blairsville, and Daytona Beach remaining. A report by the US Department of Education found that WyoTech's placement rates in California were 2% to 14% below what WyoTech had claimed.

=== Accreditation ===
WyoTech is accredited by the Accrediting Commission of Career Schools and Colleges.

== Legal proceedings under Corinthian Colleges ownership ==
In 2008, nine former WyoTech students who took heating and air-conditioning classes in Fremont claimed they had taken out student loans for as much as $40,000 each, but their training did not make them employable. According to the lawsuit filed on their behalf, instructors sometimes appeared to be drunk, fell asleep in class and could not answer basic questions, and equipment was outdated.

In 2013, WyoTech's parent company at the time, Corinthian Colleges, was sued by the state of California for "false and predatory advertising, intentional misrepresentations to students, securities fraud and unlawful use of military seals in advertisements."

In July 2014, Corinthian Colleges agreed they would close or sell all their schools within the next few months. The U.S. Department of Education announced former U.S. Attorney Patrick Fitzgerald, a well known corruption buster, would monitor the sale and closure of for-profit career colleges owned by the failing Corinthian Colleges.

On February 3, 2015, Corinthian sold 53 of its Everest and WyoTech campuses and online programs to the Zenith Education Group, a new subsidiary of the ECMC Group.

== Notable alumni ==
- Jessi Combs – metal fabricator, TV personality

== Debt cancellation and student debt relief ==
According to the National Center for Education Statistics, approximately 17-24% of WyoTech students have defaulted on their student loans.

On June 8, 2015, the US Department of Education announced that it was developing a process that would allow former students of Corinthian schools to apply for debt relief, if they believed they were victims of fraud. While the Department has still not created a formal process, they have provided the outlines of what borrowers should submit if they wish to pursue debt cancellation on the Federal Student Aid website. In addition, the advocacy group the Debt Collective has created its own, unofficial "Defense to Repayment App" that allows former students of Corinthian and other schools accused of fraud to pursue debt cancellation. The applications generated through the Debt Collective's online form was cited by the Department of Education in a Federal Register notice, which said that "a need for a clearer process for potential claimants" arose due to the submission of over 1000 defense to repayment claims by "a building debt activism movement."

== WyoTech Today ==
WyoTech was purchased in 2018 by Jim Mathis, and is now a family-owned company. Today, WyoTech has one campus open in Laramie, Wyoming. The school offers training in the automotive, autobody, diesel, and welding industries with 6 to 9 month courses. Classes run for 8 hours a day with some training being done in the shop doing hands-on work. The school also offers campus-managed housing and assistance with job placement after graduation through on-site career fairs and networking with employers around the country.
