= Altierus Career College =

Coordinates: 27.99685°N 82.49758°W

Altierus Career College was a postsecondary non-profit healthcare and trade school owned by ECMC Education. The school closed its campuses in Tampa, Florida; Norcross, Georgia; and Houston, Texas; in 2023. The school was nationally accredited by the Accrediting Commission of Career Schools and Colleges.

== History ==
The schools were once part of Corinthian Colleges, a now defunct large for-profit college chain that collapsed in 2015. Educational Credit Management Corporation (ECMC) took over the schools in 2015 under the name Zenith Education and rebranded them as Alterius Career Colleges. More than 20 Zenith campuses closed in 2017, leaving only three campuses in service. As of April 2022, ECMC Group announced the remaining three campuses would be closing.

== See also ==
- Corinthian Colleges
- Educational Credit Management Corporation
