= ICDC College =

American for-profit college (1995–2016)

- International Career Development Center, Inc.
- Motto: Change Your Life Today
- Type: Private for-profit college
- Active: 1995–2016
- President: Anna Berger
- Location: Culver City, California, United States
- Campus: 4 Campuses, online campus
- Colors: Burgundy and gold
- Website: icdccollege.edu

ICDC College was a private for-profit college with four campuses in southern California and an online campus. The college closed in 2016 and Trident University International agreed to continue instruction of ICDC's current academic programs.

== History ==
ICDC College was founded on November 13, 1995, as International Career Development Center, Inc., by Anna Berger, an educator and CPA.

The school specialized in providing entry-level training programs for students of all ages and career phases. Initially, ICDC College opened a Los Angeles campus that offered software and computer hardware training. To respond to job market and hiring needs, the school increased its program listings to include database design, business application implementation and design, and additional tech solutions.

Seeing that employers were wanting employees with more training in computers, the school began to offer coursework and programs in desktop publishing, accounting, computer networking and repair, tax preparation, medical computing, and database programming.

In 1999, the school earned its accreditation from the Accrediting Commission of Career Schools and Colleges (ACCSC). ICDC College also expanded its ability to reach students by opening a new campus in Van Nuys, California. Three years later, the school opened a campus in Huntington Park, CA. The following year, another campus was opened in Lawndale, CA.

In 2008, ICDC College was granted permission to offer Associate of Occupational Studies (AOS) programs. Also in 2008, ICDC College created an online branch of its main campus that would allow students anywhere in the world to access coursework, learning materials, and more. The online branch was approved to offer Certificates, Fast-Track Diplomas, and AOS degrees.

By the spring of 2011, ICDC was approved to change its main campus name from the "Los Angeles Main Campus" to the "ICDC College Hollywood Campus." Two years later, ICDC College would merge that campus with its Huntington Park location, with the latter location now being officially referred to as the ICDC College Main Campus.

Before it closed in 2016, ICDC College offered programs in alcohol and drug counseling, healthcare management, homeland security, business management and accounting, paralegal, and more.

== Accreditation ==
In 1999, ICDC was initially accredited by the Accrediting Commission of Career Schools and Colleges (ACCSC).

== Academics ==
ICDC College offered three types of programs: Associate of Occupational Studies (AOS), Fast-Track Diplomas, and Certificates. The AOS programs, which are also known as associate degrees, were two year programs. Fast-Track Diplomas and Certificates were nine and six month programs, respectively.

== Campuses ==
The Huntington Park Branch Campus became the ICDC College Main Campus. The South Bay Branch Campus and Los Angeles Main Campus (Hollywood) closed in 2013.

== Distance education (online college) ==
In August 2009, ICDC College launched its Online Campus, providing distance education. ICDC College was approved by ACCSC in February 2009 to provide online Associate of Occupational Studies Degrees. In September 2009, ICDC College Online Campus received further approvals from ACCSC to offer select diploma and certificate programs, in addition to its Associate of Occupational Studies Degrees. ICDC College's Online Campus is located in Culver City, California.

== Awards and recognitions ==
ICDC College's campuses received multiple awards. These include:

- The Van Nuys Branch Campus was recognized by ACCSC as a 2002–2003 School of Distinction
- The Huntington Park Branch Campus was recognized by ACCSC as a 2004–2005 and 2009–2010 School of Distinction
- The former South Bay Branch Campus was recognized by ACCSC as a 2006–2007 School of Distinction
- ACCSC recognized the Los Angeles Main Campus (Hollywood) as a 2009–2010 School of Distinction
- ICDC College's South Bay campus received the 2010–2011 ACCSC School of Excellence Award

== Admissions and financial aid ==
ICDC College had an open enrollment policy and was approved to receive financial aid and Military benefits for students who qualified. ICDC College's student population was just over 4,000 and the student-to-faculty ratio was around 23:1.
