= Ivy Bridge College =

American online institution

- Motto: Guided path. Brighter future.
- Type: Two-Year Online Institution
- Established: 2008
- Affiliations: North Central Association of Colleges and Schools
- Location: San Francisco, California; Toledo, Ohio, United States
- Website: Ivy Bridge College Official Website

Ivy Bridge College is a two-year online institution with operations in San Francisco, California and Toledo, Ohio. Ivy Bridge was founded in 2008 by Tiffin University and Altius Education Inc. Ivy Bridge's stated goal is provide an affordable higher education option by improving the transfer rate of two-year students to four-year institutions. On August 2, 2013, Tiffin University announced that it had been ordered by its accreditor, the Higher Learning Commission, to discontinue offering associate degree programs through Ivy Bridge College as of October 20, 2013.

== Organization and administration ==
Ivy Bridge College was developed by Tiffin University and Altius Education, Inc. Altius Education is a higher education company that specializes in online learning systems and delivery models. Operational roles of Ivy Bridge College are split along instructional and administrative lines. Altius implements the technical aspects of running the College's online program. Tiffin University carries out curriculum construction and instruction.

The College awards its graduates degrees through Tiffin University, which is accredited by the North Central Association of Colleges and Schools Commission and the Association of Collegiate Business Schools and Programs. Ivy Bridge grants students who maintain satisfactory academic standing admittance into one of the College's four-year partner institutions. As of July 2012, Ivy Bridge has entered into partnerships with 143 public and private universities.

== Student body ==
Enrollment in Ivy Bridge's degree programs reached nearly 2,000 in 2011. Altius’ CEO Paul Freedman announced that Ivy Bridge intends to increase enrollment to 5,000 students within the next 18 months, with a goal of enrolling upwards of 30,000 students by 2017.

== Recent developments ==
Altius Education Inc.’s founder and CEO Paul Freedman unveiled the Helix educational platform during Arizona State University’s 2012 Education Innovation Summit. Based on “adaptive, competency-based learning”, Helix generates a curriculum intended to accommodate a student's learning style. Helix incorporates the use of on-demand assistance, progress assessments, storytelling, and interactive classrooms.

The transition from Ivy Bridge's Moodle platform to the Helix system is scheduled to begin early in 2013.

A new tuition structure, aimed at increasing the number of students enrolled on a full-time basis, went into effect at the start of the summer 2012 semester. It decreases the cost by 14% for students attending the college full-time.

Tiffin University has been ordered by its accrediting body to stop offering associate degrees through Ivy Bridge as of October 20, 2013, calling into question the future of Ivy Bridge College.
