= Proprietary college =

For-profit colleges and universities

Proprietary colleges are for-profit colleges and universities generally operated by their owners, investors, or shareholders in a manner prioritizing shareholder primacy as opposed to education provided by non-profit institution (such as non-sectarian, religious, or governmental organization) that prioritize students as project stakeholders.

Because they are not funded by tax money, their long-term sustainability is dependent on the value they provide relative to the perceived value of a degree from a higher educational institution overall. The increased reliance on federal student aid funds by these "for-profit" schools is of growing concern. Since federal student loans are typically guaranteed by the government, for-profit colleges can reap a profit from taxpayers even if students drop out after enrolling, do not complete a degree, or the degree turns out to be nearly worthless for future employment. Students can be stuck with large and unmanageable debt loads, defaulting at a significantly higher rate than students at traditional non-profit institutions. Non-profit institutions generally depend in part on academic excellence and creating graduates that succeed in their fields, while for-profit schools are often based on attracting large numbers of students with few requirements in terms of academic qualifications for entry because federal loans are provided for good and bad students alike. Some institutions in this category are regionally accredited, while many others are not accredited by a government-recognized accreditation organization and resemble diploma mills. Sometimes a proprietary college may also overlap with the sector of non-degree granting business colleges.

Traditionally, a common argument against for-profit universities has been that the science and theory behind the learning technique is more important than the profit or specific skills gained, thus profit or financial success should not be a motivational factor in education. The argument in favor of for-profit universities has been that a student learning from a professor who has never needed to produce their product or service for profit is ill-prepared for a free-enterprise system. However, as non-profit colleges and universities increasingly utilize professionals and former professionals in their teaching faculties, this distinction has become less significant.

== History in the United States ==
While to some extent proprietary colleges have always existed, their numbers and ubiquitous nature exploded after 1992 when then-committee chairman John Boehner (R-Ohio) of the House of Representatives' Committee on Education and the Workforce killed a federal regulation known as the "90-10 rule", and by simplifying the definition of "institution of higher education" to place for-profit schools on par with nonprofit colleges regarding federal-aid eligibility. The idea behind the 90-10 rule was that if a proprietary school's offerings were truly valuable—for example, if they filled some niche that traditional state and private non-profit educational institutions did not—then surely 10% of their students would be willing to pay completely out-of-pocket, i.e., those who fell above federal guidelines for receiving taxpayer subsidies to attend college. Traditional educational institutions routinely met this bar without even paying attention.

== Classification ==
Proprietary colleges are sometimes called career colleges, business colleges, proprietary schools, institutes, or for-profit colleges. The term preferred by the New York State-based Association for Proprietary Colleges is Proprietary colleges.

Kevin Kinser, assistant professor of educational administration and policy at the University at Albany, has proposed a "Multidimensional classification" scheme of for-profit higher education. Kinser's classes of proprietary colleges are organized by these criteria:

1. Geographic scope:

- "Neighborhood" – close geographic proximity, in a single state
- "Regional" – two or more campuses in neighboring states
- "National" – including in states across the United States and virtual colleges

2. Ownership dimension:

- "Publicly traded" corporations
- Family-owned "enterprise institution(s)"
- "Venture institutions" held by private investors

3. Highest degree granted:

- Schools that give non-degree certificates
- Institutes that grant associate's degree—such as L.P.N., A.O.S., or A.A.S.
- Colleges that grant a bachelor's degree—usually a B.S. or BBA
- Universities that grant graduate degrees – a master's or doctorate.

== See also ==
- For-profit education
- List of for-profit universities and colleges
