= List of Alpha Iota chapters =

Alpha Iota is a national collegiate professional sorority for women in the field of business. Alpha Iota was established in 1925 at the American Institute of Business in Des Moines, Iowa. The sorority has collegiate and alumnae chapters. Previously, it also had professional chapters.

== Collegiate chapters ==
Following is a partial list of Alpha Iota collegiate chapters, with active chapters indicated in bold and inactive chapters and institutions indicated in italics.

Chapter	Charter date	Installation date and range	Institution	Location	Status	Ref.
Alpha	January 1, 1930	October 21, 1925 – 2016	American Institute of Business	Des Moines, Iowa	Inactive	(Note: Charter granted as a chapter of National after going National) (Note: In 2016, the AIB College of Business closed and became the University of Iowa Des Moines campus.)
Beta (see Beta Beta)	March 25, 1930	April 14, 1930	Huff School of Commerce	Kansas City, Missouri	Inactive	
Gamma (see Lambda Zeta)	March 21, 1930	March 28, 1930	Tulsa Business College	Tulsa, Oklahoma	Inactive	
Delta (see Beta Xi)	February 24, 1930	March 21, 1930	Brown's Business College (laterDraughon's Business College)	Springfield, Illinois	Inactive	
Epsilon	February 27, 1930	March 31, 1930	National Business College	Abilene, Texas	Inactive	
Zeta	March 7, 1930	April 21, 1930	California College of Commerce	Long Beach, California	Inactive	
Eta	March 17, 1930	April 25, 1930	Astoria Commercial College	Astoria, Oregon	Inactive	
Theta	March 31, 1930	April 17, 1930	Canton Actual Business College	Canton, Ohio	Inactive	
Iota	April 8, 1930	April 15, 1930	Capital City Commercial College	Topeka, Kansas	Inactive	
Kappa	April 15, 1930	May 14, 1930	Brown's Business College	Alton, Illinois	Inactive	
Lambda	April 18, 1930	May 17, 1930	Northwestern Business College (aka Kinman Business University)	Spokane, Washington	Inactive	(Note: The college merged with the Kinman Business University in 1943.)
Mu	April 19, 1930	May 9, 1930	Central Business College	Sedalia, Missouri	Inactive	
Nu	April 28, 1930	May 7, 1930	Brown's Business College	Galesburg, Illinois	Inactive	
Xi		before 1939			Inactive	
Omicron	May 8, 1930	May 20, 1930	Blair Business School	Colorado Springs, Colorado	Inactive	
Pi	May 8, 1930	May 18, 1930	Massey Business College	Birmingham, Alabama	Inactive	
Rho	May 10, 1930	June 1930	Soulé College	New Orleans, Louisiana	Inactive	
Sigma	June 2, 1930	June 28, 1930	Knapp's Business College	Tacoma, Washington	Inactive	
Tau	June 9, 1930	July 1930	San Jose Secretarial School	San Jose, California	Inactive	
Upsilon	June 16, 1930	July 26, 1930	Metropolitan Business College	Seattle, Washington	Inactive	(Note: The college closed circa 1990.)
Phi	June 16, 1930	July 1930	Portsmouth Interstate Business College	Portsmouth, Ohio	Inactive	
Chi	July 21, 1930	August 20, 1930	National Business Training School	Sioux City, Iowa	Inactive	
Psi	October 4, 1930	October 1930	Hastings Business College	Alexandria, Nebraska	Inactive	
Omega	October 4, 1930	October 1930	Meadows-Draughon Business College	Shreveport, Louisiana	Inactive	
Alpha Alpha		before 1939			Inactive	
Alpha Beta	October 6, 1930	October 17, 1930	Midstate College	Peoria, Illinois	Inactive	(Note: Chapter formed at Brown's Business College of Commerce which became Midstate College of Commerce in 1960 and Midstate College in 1970.)
Alpha Gamma	October 20, 1930	November 8, 1930	Haddock Business University	Jacksonville, Florida	Inactive	
Alpha Delta	October 22, 1930	October 22, 1930	South Bend College of Commerce	South Bend, Indiana	Inactive	
Alpha Epsilon	October 22, 1930	December 12, 1930	Draughton College of Business Administration	Montgomery, Alabama	Inactive	
Alpha Zeta	October 29, 1930	November 20, 1930	Nettleton Business College (aka Nettleton Commercial College)	Sioux Falls, South Dakota	Inactive	
Alpha Eta	October 30, 1930	November 19, 1930	Youngstown College School of Business	Youngstown, Ohio	Inactive	
Alpha Theta	November 15, 1930	January 30, 1931	LDS Business College	Salt Lake City, Utah	Inactive	
Alpha Iota		before 1939	Oklahoma School of Accountancy and Law	Tulsa, Oklahoma	Inactive	
Alpha Kappa	December 9, 1930	January 17, 1931	Smithdeal Business College	Richmond, Virginia	Inactive	(Note: Smithdeal Business College merged with Massey Business College in 1932 to form Smithdeal-Massey Business College. That institution closed in 1982.)
Alpha Lambda	December 15, 1930	January 10, 1931	Goldey College	Wilmington, Delaware	Inactive	
Alpha Mu	December 22, 1930	January 20, 1931	Stone College, Inc.	New Haven, Connecticut	Inactive	
Alpha Nu	December 23, 1930	January 23, 1931	Macon and Andrews Colleges	Memphis, Tennessee	Inactive	
Alpha Xi	January 20, 1931	January 24, 1931	Central California Commercial College	Fresno, California	Inactive	
Alpha Omicron	January 13, 1931	January 23, 1931	Twin City Business University	Minneapolis, Minnesota	Inactive	
Alpha Pi	January 15, 1931	January 28, 1931	Brown's Business College	Jacksonville, Illinois	Inactive	
Alpha Rho	January 17, 1931	February 10, 1931	Parsons Business School	Kalamazoo, Michigan	Inactive	
Alpha Sigma	January 31, 1931	March 28, 1931	Bryant & Stratton College	Baltimore, Maryland	Inactive	
Alpha Tau	January 23, 1931	February 28, 1931	Bartlesville Business College	Bartlesville, Oklahoma	Inactive	(Note: Chapter was also called Oklahoma Beta.)
Alpha Upsilon	January 30, 1931	February 21, 1931	Thompson Business College	York, Pennsylvania	Inactive	
Alpha Phi	February 9, 1931	February 28, 1931	Western School of Business	Sacramento, California	Inactive	
Alpha Chi	February 14, 1931	May 1931	Spencer Business School	Schenectady, New York	Inactive	
Alpha Psi	April 4, 1931	June 6, 1931	Eastman School of Business	Poughkeepsie, New York	Inactive	
Alpha Omega	March 8, 1931	April 5, 1931	Strayer College	Washington, D.C.	Inactive	
Beta Alpha		before 1939			Inactive	
Beta Beta	March 8, 1935	March 1934	Huff College	Kansas City, Missouri	Inactive	(Note: Both Beta and Beta Beta were at Huff)
Beta Gamma	April 31, 1931	May 11, 1931	Speedwa Business School	St. Louis, Missouri	Inactive	
Beta Delta	April 27, 1931	June 6, 1931	Woodbury's Business College	Los Angeles, California	Inactive	
Beta Epsilon	August 11, 1931	October 24, 1931	West Virginia Business College	Clarksburg, West Virginia	Inactive	
Beta Zeta (see Gamma Zeta)	August 18, 1931	October 17, 1931	Stockton College of Commerce	Stockton, California	Inactive	
Beta Eta		before 1939			Inactive	
Beta Theta	October 14, 1931	January 16, 1932	Ross Business College	Grand Junction, Colorado	Inactive	
Beta Iota	December 5, 1931	April 6, 1932	Smithsonian Business College	Ogden, Utah	Inactive	
Beta Kappa	December 14, 1931	January 30, 1932	University Secretarial Branch of Metropolitan Business College	Seattle, Washington	Inactive	
Beta Lambda	December 22, 1931	February 9, 1932	Altoona School of Commerce	Altoona, Pennsylvania	Inactive	
Beta Mu	December 31, 1932	February 18, 1932	Butler Business College	Butler, Pennsylvania	Inactive	
Beta Nu	December 31, 1931	February 12, 1932	Littleford-Nelson School of Commerce	Cincinnati, Ohio	Inactive	
Beta Xi (see Delta)	December 31, 1931	January 30, 1932	Draughon's Business University	Springfield, Illinois	Inactive	
Beta Omicron	February 17, 1932	April 9, 1932	Charleston School of Commerce	Charleston, West Virginia	Inactive	
Beta Pi	February 20, 1932	April 30, 1932	Southwestern State Teachers College	Weatherford, Oklahoma	Inactive	
Beta Rho		before 1939	,		Inactive	
Beta Sigma	March 17, 1932	April 14, 1932	Albany Business College	Albany, New York	Inactive	
Beta Tau	April 9, 1932	May 4, 1932	McCann School of Business	Reading, Pennsylvania	Inactive	
Beta Upsilon (see Zeta Upsilon and Lambda Pi)			Croft Secretarial and Accounting School	Durham, North Carolina	Inactive	
Beta Phi		before 1939			Inactive	
Beta Chi	June 21, 1932	July 7, 1932	Utica School of Commerce	Utica, New York	Inactive	
Beta Psi	April 21, 1932	May 13, 1932	College of Commerce	Burlington, Iowa	Inactive	
Beta Omega	May 25, 1932	June 6, 1932	Jackson Business University	Jackson, Michigan	Inactive	
Gamma Alpha	September 26, 1932	September 30, 1932	The Business Institute	Detroit, Michigan	Inactive	
Gamma Beta	October 7, 1932	January 14, 1933	Mountain State Business College	Parkersburg, West Virginia	Inactive	
Gamma Gamma		before 1939			Inactive	
Gamma Delta	October 21, 1932	November 5, 1932	Brantley-Draughon Business College	Fort Worth, Texas	Inactive	
Gamma Epsilon		before 1939	Bliss Business College	Columbus, Ohio	Inactive	
Gamma Zeta (See Beta Zeta)	October 9, 1934		Delta College	Stockton, California	Inactive	(Note: Marked as formerly Beta Zeta Chapter, Entire Chapter Membership Transferred)
Gamma Eta	December 5, 1932	December 17, 1932	Wichita Business College	Wichita, Kansas	Inactive	
Gamma Theta	January 7, 1933	January 28, 1933	Norfolk Business College	Norfolk, Virginia	Inactive	
Gamma Iota		before 1939			Inactive	
Gamma Kappa	January 25, 1933	February 11, 1933	Detroit Business University	Detroit, Michigan	Inactive	
Gamma Lambda	February 18, 1933	March 4, 1933	William Woods College	Fulton, Missouri	Inactive	
Gamma Mu	November 22, 1933	December 9, 1933	Northwestern School of Commerce	Portland, Oregon	Inactive	
Gamma Nu	November 22, 1933	December 9, 1933	Terre Haute Commercial College	Terre Haute, Indiana	Inactive	
Gamma Xi	January 10, 1934	January 10, 1934	Hammel-Actual Business College	Akron, Ohio	Inactive	
Gamma Omicron	April 11, 1934	April 21, 1934	Lansing Business University	Lansing, Michigan	Inactive	
Gamma Pi	June 21, 1934	February 14, 1935 –194x ?	Syracuse Secretarial School	Syracuse, New York	Inactive	(Note: The school closed during World War II.)
Gamma Rho	July 24, 1934	September 1934	Thompson College	Harrisburg, Pennsylvania	Inactive	
Gamma Sigma	September 14, 1934	December 8, 1934	Fisher Business College	Boston Massachusetts	Inactive	
Gamma Tau	November 27, 1934	December 11, 1934 (Note: LA EPR gives as Tuesday Evening when published on December 20, 1934 - December 18, 1934 is previous Tuesday evening, but source from Sorority itself says December 11, 1934)	Woodbury College	Hollywood, Los Angeles, California	Inactive	
Gamma Upsilon	December 20, 1934	February 9, 1935	Bliss College	Columbus, Ohio	Inactive	
Gamma Phi	February 14, 1935	March 1, 1935	Spencerian College	Milwaukee, Wisconsin	Inactive	
Gamma Chi	August 17, 1935	September 28, 1935	Kelsey-Jenney Commercial College	San Diego, California	Inactive	
Gamma Psi	August 17, 1935	September 28, 1935	Jamestown Business College	Jamestown, New York	Inactive	
Chi Alpha	October 7, 1935	October 26, 1935	Angus School of Commerce	Winnipeg, Manitoba, Canada	Inactive	
Gamma Omega	November 9, 1935	January 11, 1936	Wisconsin Business University	La Crosse, Wisconsin	Inactive	
Sigma Kappa	September 30, 1935	October 19, 1935	Hills Business University	Oklahoma City, Oklahoma	Inactive	
Delta Alpha	May 16, 1936	June 26, 1936	Miami Jacobs Junior College of Business	Dayton, Ohio	Inactive	
**Delta Beta**	October 29, 1936	November 14, 1936	Tiffin University	Tiffin, Ohio	Active	
Delta Gamma (see Theta Tau)	November 6, 1936	November 20, 1936	Great Falls Commercial College	Great Falls, Montana	Inactive	
Delta Delta		before 1939			Inactive	
Delta Epsilon	November 23, 1936	December 12, 1936	Amarillo College	Amarillo, Texas	Inactive	
Delta Zeta	November 27, 1936	December 11, 1936	Taylor Business School	Philadelphia, Pennsylvania	Inactive	
Delta Eta	December 17, 1936	February 5, 1937 (Note: Primary source says Feb 5, 1937, JoBE says March 13, 1937 unable to access even through Wikipedia library.)	Heald Business College	San Jose, California	Inactive	
Mu Beta	February 18, 1937	March 14, 1937	Marietta Business Institute	Marietta, Ohio	Inactive	
Delta Theta (see Theta Iota)	March 25, 1937	April 3, 1937	Platt-Gard Business University	St. Joseph, Missouri	Inactive	(Note: The school became affiliated with Northwest Missouri Community College in the late 1980s.)
Delta Iota	March 11, 1937	March 20, 1937	Glendale Secretarial School	Glendale, California	Inactive	
Delta Kappa	March 11, 1937	March 20, 1937	Tampa Business College	Tampa, Florida	Inactive	(Note: The college was also known as Hatton Tampa Business College. It was renamed Tampa College in 1970.)
Delta Lambda	May 17, 1937	June 27, 1937	Davenport Institute	Ludington, Michigan	Inactive	
Delta Mu	June 5, 1937	July 6, 1937	Heald College	San Francisco, California	Inactive	
Delta Nu		Before December 1937	American Institute of Commerce	Davenport, Iowa	Inactive	
Delta Xi					Inactive	
Delta Omicron		Before May 1938	Link School of Business (aka Link's Business College)	Boise, Idaho	Inactive	
Delta Pi					Inactive	
Delta Rho		Before May 1941		Wenatchee, Washington	Inactive	
Delta Sigma		Before 1941	Black Hills Commercial College	Rapid City, South Dakota	Inactive	
Delta Tau					Inactive	
Delta Upsilon					Inactive	
Delta Phi		April 1939	University Business College	Eugene, Oregon	Inactive	
Delta Chi	May 15, 1935	June 7, 1935	Duffs-Iron City College	Pittsburgh, Pennsylvania	Inactive	
Delta Psi		May 6, 1939	Queens College	Charlotte, North Carolina	Inactive	(Note: Chapter was formed at Queens-Chicora College, which later became Queens College.)
Delta Omega		Before January 1941	Lockyear Business College	Evansville, Indiana	Inactive	
Zeta Alpha					Inactive	
Zeta Beta					Inactive	
Zeta Gamma		October 1939	Draughon's Business College	Memphis, Tennessee	Inactive	
Zeta Delta		March 30, 1940 – 1944	East Carolina Teachers College	Greenville, North Carolina	Merged (**ΠΩΠ**)	
Zeta Epsilon					Inactive	
Zeta Zeta					Inactive	
Zeta Eta		February 22, 1941		Twin Falls, Idaho	Inactive	
Zeta Theta (see Eta Mu)		March 23, 1941	Marion Business College	Marion, Ohio	Inactive	
Zeta Iota (see Zeta)		May 26, 1941	Shurtleff College	Alton, Illinois	Inactive	
Chi Beta		Before January 1941	Success Business College	Saskatoon, Saskatchewan Canada	Inactive	
Chi Gamma		December 14, 1940	Reliance School of Commerce	Regina, Saskatchewan, Canada	Inactive	
Chi Delta		February 14, 1941	Henderson Business College	Calgary, Alberta, Canada	Inactive	
Zeta Kappa			Riverside Business College	Riverside, California	Inactive	
Zeta Lambda			Steed College of Technology	Elizabethton, Tennessee	Inactive	
Zeta Mu					Inactive	
Zeta Nu					Inactive	
Zeta Xi					Inactive	
Zeta Omicron		January 25, 1945	Everett Business College	Everett, Washington	Inactive	
Zeta Pi					Inactive	
Zeta Sigma					Inactive	
Zeta Rho			Moline Institute of Commerce	Moline, Illinois	Inactive	
Zeta Tau			Central City Business Institute	Syracuse, New York	Inactive	
Zeta Upsilon (see Beta Epsilon and Lambda Pi)		January 10, 1947	Croft Secretarial and Accounting School	Durham, North Carolina	Inactive	
Zeta Phi (see Theta Phi)		1947	Clevenger's Business College (aka Evans School of Business)	Hickory, North Carolina	Inactive	
Zeta Chi		1947	Iowa City Commercial College	Iowa City, Iowa	Inactive	
Zeta Psi					Inactive	
Zeta Omega			Grau Business College	Long Beach, California	Inactive	
Chi Epsilon		Before June 1947		New Westminster, British Columbia Canada	Inactive	
Eta Alpha					Inactive	
Eta Beta		Before May 1948	Weber College	Ogden, Utah	Inactive	
Eta Gamma			Portsmouth Interstate Business College	Portsmouth, Ohio	Inactive	
Eta Delta		Before August 1948	Browning Commercial School	Albuquerque, New Mexico	Inactive	
Eta Epsilon					Inactive	
Eta Zeta					Inactive	
Eta Eta					Inactive	
Eta Theta			Rochester Business Institute	Rochester, New York	Inactive	
Eta Iota		Before August 1950	Springfield Business College (aka Springfield Normal and Business College)	Springfield, Illinois	Inactive	
Eta Lambda		1948–19xx ?; November 1954	Phillips Commercial School	Honolulu, Hawaii	Inactive	
Eta Mu (see Zeta Theta)			Marion Business College	Marion, Ohio	Inactive	
Eta Nu					Inactive	
Eta Xi		Before December 1949	Louisiana College	Pineville, Louisiana	Inactive	
Eta Omicron		March 18, 1948	Honolulu Business College	Honolulu, Hawaii	Inactive	
Eta Pi			Heald's Business College	Oakland, California	Inactive	
Eta Rho					Inactive	
Eta Sigma					Inactive	
Eta Tau					Inactive	
Eta Upsilon		Before December 1949	Lain Business College	Indianapolis, Indiana	Inactive	
Eta Phi		Before August 1951	California College of Commerce	Long Beach, California	Inactive	
Eta Chi			Howard Business College	Shelby, North Carolina	Inactive	
Eta Psi					Inactive	
Eta Omega			Jones College	Jacksonville, Florida	Inactive	
Chi Zeta		Before September 1949	Pittman Business College	Vancouver, British Columbia Canada	Inactive	
Theta Alpha					Inactive	
Theta Beta		1951	Reno Business College	Reno, Nevada	Inactive	
Theta Gamma					Inactive	
Theta Delta					Inactive	
Theta Epsilon					Inactive	
Theta Zeta		1953	Armstrong College	Berkeley, California	Inactive	
Theta Eta			Eastern Michigan College of Commerce	Port Huron, Michigan	Inactive	
Theta Theta					Inactive	
Theta Iota (see Delta Theta)			Platt College of Commerce and Secretarial Training	St. Joseph, Missouri	Inactive	
Theta Kappa					Inactive	
Theta Lambda					Inactive	
Theta Mu					Inactive	
Theta Nu			Criss Business College	Anaheim, California	Inactive	(Note: Criss College closed in December 1988.)
Theta Pi			Kansas City Business College	Kansas City, Missouri	Inactive	
Theta Tau (see Delta Gamma)		Before June 1956	Great Falls Commercial College	Great Falls, Montana	Inactive	
Theta Phi (see Zeta Phi)			Clevenger's Business College	Hickory, North Carolina	Inactive	(Note: The college was later known as Clevenger College of Business Administration.)
Theta Chi			Barnes Business College	Denver, Colorado	Inactive	
Theta Omega			Palmer Junior College	Columbia, South Carolina	Inactive	
Kappa Alpha					Inactive	
Kappa Beta		January 1957	National Business College	Roanoke, Virginia	Inactive	
Kappa Gamma		February 1957	College of Commerce	Rock Hill, South Carolina	Inactive	
Kappa Delta		April 1957	Twin Falls Business College	Twin Falls, Idaho	Inactive	
Kappa Epsilon					Inactive	
Kappa Zeta					Inactive	
Kappa Eta					Inactive	
Kappa Theta					Inactive	
Kappa Iota		April 12, 1958	Champlain College	Burlington, Vermont	Inactive	
Kappa Kappa					Inactive	
Kappa Lambda			Norfolk College	Norfolk, Virginia	Inactive	
Kappa Mu			Maryland Medical Secretarial School	Hagerstown, Maryland	Inactive	
Kappa Nu			New Castle Business College	New Castle, Pennsylvania	Inactive	
Kappa Xi					Inactive	
Kappa Omicron					Inactive	
Kappa Pi			Madison Business College	Madison, Wisconsin	Inactive	
Kappa Rho					Inactive	
Kappa Sigma				Oklahoma City, Oklahoma	Inactive	
Kappa Tau			Steubenville Business College	Steubenville, Ohio	Inactive	
Kappa Upsilon			Butte Business College	Butte, Montana	Inactive	(Note: The college closed in 1975.)
Kappa Phi					Inactive	
Kappa Chi			Sullivan Junior Business College	Louisville, Kentucky	Inactive	
Kappa Psi		October 18, 1947	Evans Business College	Concord, North Carolina	Inactive	(Note: Biscayne Southern College absorbed Evans Business College as a branch campus in 1974. That college closed in 2004.)
Kappa Omega					Inactive	
Lambda Alpha			Williamsport School of Commerce	Williamsport, Pennsylvania	Inactive	
Lambda Beta					Inactive	
Lambda Gamma		Before December 1964	Alverson-Draughon College	Birmingham, Alabama	Inactive	
Lambda Delta		Before 1965		Saginaw, Michigan	Inactive	
Lambda Epsilon					Inactive	
Lambda Zeta (see Gamma)		Before 1966	Tulsa Business College	Tulsa, Oklahoma	Inactive	
Lambda Eta		Before December 1964	University of Palm Beach	Palm Beach, Florida	Inactive	
Lambda Theta					Inactive	
Lambda Iota					Inactive	
Lambda Kappa		Before June 1969	Jones College	Orlando, Florida	Inactive	
Lambda Lambda					Inactive	
Lambda Mu					Inactive	
Lambda Nu					Inactive	
Lambda Xi					Inactive	
Lambda Pi (see Beta Upsilon and Zeta Upsilon)		Before 1968	Croft Business College	Durham, North Carolina	Inactive	
			Baker Business College	Flint, Michigan	Inactive	
		Between 1964 and June 1967	Boise Business School	Boise, Idaho	Inactive	
		Before September 1932	College of Commerce	Burlington, Iowa	Inactive	
			Cornell University	Ithaca, New York	Inactive	
			Davis Business School	Toledo, Ohio	Inactive	
			Dayton College	Dayton, Ohio	Inactive	
			Edmondson School of Business	Chattanooga, Tennessee	Inactive	
		Before February 1948	Elizabethton College of Commerce	Elizabethton, Tennessee	Inactive	
			Hagerstown Business College	Hagerstown, Maryland	Inactive	
			Hardbarger's Business College	Raleigh, North Carolina	Inactive	(Note: The college changed its name to Hardbarger's Junior College of Business, before merging into Phillips Junior College.)
			Hughes Business College	Minnesota	Inactive	
			Lear Seigler Institute	Washington, D.C.	Inactive	
			National Legal Secretarial School	Hagerstown, Maryland	Inactive	
			Oklahoma School of Business	Tulsa, Oklahoma	Inactive	
			Palmer College	Charleston, South Carolina	Inactive	
			Port Huron Business School	Port Huron, Michigan	Inactive	
			Ross Business School	Grand Junction, Colorado	Inactive	
			Speedwriting Secretarial College	Bristol, Tennessee	Inactive	
		Before November 1932	Stone School of Business	New Haven, Connecticut	Inactive	
			University of Utah	Salt Lake City, Utah	Inactive	
				Flint, Michigan	Inactive	
				Jackson, Michigan	Inactive	
		1931		Kalamazoo, Michigan	Inactive	
				London, Ontario, Canada	Inactive	
				Mason, Michigan	Inactive	
		Before August 1938		Pasadena, California	Inactive	
		Before June 1934		San Francisco, California	Inactive	
				Toronto, Ontario Canada	Inactive	

== Professional chapters ==
Following is a list of former Alpha Iota professional chapters, with inactive chapters indicated in italics.

Chapter	Charter date	Location	Status	Ref.
Charleston Mu Gamma		Charleston, West Virginia	Inactive	
Lansing Mu Gamma		Lansing, Michigan	Inactive	
Parkersburg Mu Gamma		Parkersburg, West Virginia	Inactive	
Pasadena Mu Gamma	1951	Pasadena, California	Inactive	
Fresno Mu Gamma		Fresno, California	Inactive	
Stockton Mu Gamma		Stockton, California	Inactive	

== Alumnae chapters ==
Following is a list of Alpha Iota alumnae chapters, with active chapters indicated in bold and inactive chapters in italics.

Chapter	Charter date	Location	Status	Ref.
Galesburg Alumnae	May 28, 1930	Galesburg, Illinois	Inactive	
**Des Moines Alumnae**	1930	Des Moines, Iowa	Active	
LDS Business College Alumnae	June 25, 1931	Salt Lake City, Utah	Inactive	
**Colorado Springs Alumnae**	1932	Colorado Springs, Colorado	Active	
**New Haven Alumnae**	1932	New Haven, Connecticut	Active	
Cincinnati Alumnae	Before April 1933	Cincinnati, Ohio	Inactive	
Shreveport Alumnae	Before June 1933	Shreveport, Louisiana	Inactive	
**Spokane Alumnae**	1934	Spokane, Washington	Active	
**Wichita Alumnae**	1934	Wichita, Kansas	Active	
Detroit Alumnae	Before November 1934	Detroit, Michigan	Inactive	
Akron Alumnae	1935	Akron, Ohio	Inactive	
**Reading Alumnae**	1935	Reading, Pennsylvania	Active	
San Diego Alumnae	1935	San Diego, California	Inactive	
Los Angeles Alumnae	Before July 1935	Los Angeles, California	Inactive	
**Syracuse Alumnae**	1936	Syracuse, New York	Active	
Salt Lake City Alumnae	Before July 1937	Salt Lake City, Utah	Inactive	
Lansing Alumnae	Before February 1938	Lansing, Michigan	Inactive	
Great Falls Alumnae	Before February 1938	Great Falls, Montana	Inactive	
D.C. Alumnae	Before May 1938	Washington, D.C.	Inactive	
Washington Alumnae	Before May 1938	Washington, D.C.	Inactive	
York Alumnae	Before June 1938	York, Pennsylvania	Inactive	
**Alpha Iota of Grand Rapids**	1938	Grand Rapids, Michigan	Active	
Fresno Alumnae	1938	Fresno, California	Inactive	
San Francisco Alunmnae	1938	San Francisco, California	Inactive	
Altoona Alumnae	Before February 1939	Altoona, Pennsylvania	Inactive	
Sioux Falls Alumnae	Before May 1939	Sioux Falls, South Dakota	Inactive	
Davenport Alumnae	Before September 1939	Davenport, Iowa	Active	
Memphis Alumnae	Before October 1939	Memphis, Tennessee	Inactive	
Kansas City Alumnae	Before October 1939	Kansas City, Missouri	Inactive	
**Tiffin Alumnae**	1940	Tiffin, Ohio	Active	
Tacoma Alumnae	Before April 1940	Tacoma, Washington	Inactive	
**Winnipeg Alumnae**	1941	Winnipeg, Manitoba, Canada	Active	
South Bend Alumnae	Before February 1941	South Bend, Indiana	Inactive	
Boise Alumnae	April 21, 1941	Boise, Idaho	Inactive	
Columbus Alumnae	Before July 1942	Columbus, Ohio	Inactive	
**Harrisburg Alumnae**	1945	Harrisburg, Pennsylvania	Active	
Charlotte Alumnae	Before May 1947	Charlotte, North Carolina	Inactive	
Calgary Alumnae	1948	Calgary, Alberta, Canada	Inactive	
Ogden Alumnae	Before May 1948	Ogden, Utah	Inactive	
Oakland Alumnae	1950	Oakland, California	Inactive	
**Denver Alumnae**	1951	Denver, Colorado	Active	
Reno Alumnae	January 1952	Reno, Nevada	Active	
Fort Worth Alumnae	Before September 1953	Fort Worth, Texas	Inactive	
**Honolulu Alumnae**	1954	Honolulu, Hawaii	Active	
Evansville Alumnae	Before May 1955	Evansville, Indiana	Inactive	
Ravenna Alumnae	1956	Ravenna, Ohio	Inactive	
Albuquerque Alumnae	June 27, 1956	Albuquerque, New Mexico	Inactive	
Peoria Alumnae	1957	Peoria, Illinois	Inactive	
Durham Alumnae	1962	Durham, North Carolina	Inactive	
Rochester Alumnae	Before March 1963	Rochester, New York	Inactive	
Portland Alumnae	1964	Portland, Oregon	Inactive	
Tulsa Alumnae	Before April 1964	Tulsa, Oklahoma	Inactive	
Birmingham Alumnae	Before April 1966	Birmingham, Alabama	Inactive	
Toledo Alumnae	Before June 1966	Toledo, Ohio	Inactive	
Galesburg Alumnae	Before April 1969	Galesburg, Illinois	Inactive	
Moline Alumnae	Before April 1969	Moline, Illinois	Inactive	
Springfield Alumnae	Before April 1969	Springfield, Illinois	Inactive	
University of Palm Beach Alumnae	1968	Palm Beach, Florida	Inactive	
**Southeastern Michigan Alumnae**	1970	Dearborn, Michigan	Active	
Eta Theta Alumnae	1972	Rochester, New York	Inactive	
Marietta Alumnae	Before August 1977	Marietta, Ohio	Inactive	
Parkersburg Alumnae	Before August 1977	Parkersburg, West Virginia	Inactive	
Chi Zeta Alumnae	1978	Vancouver, British Columbia, Canada	Inactive	
Alpha Iota of Lansing	2002	Lansing, Michigan	Inactive	
New York City Alumnae		New York City, New York	Inactive	

== See also ==
- Professional fraternities and sororities
