= GreenCity Arena =

Proposed sports arena in Virginia, U.S.

- Interactive map of GreenCity Arena
- Location: 1400 Best Plaza Drive, Richmond, Virginia 23227
- Coordinates: 37°38′25″N 77°26′50″W
- Capacity: Approx. 17,000

Construction
- Built: 2026 (planned)
- Cost: US$250 million

GreenCity Arena is a proposed multi-purpose entertainment and sports arena located near Richmond, Virginia.

The GreenCity Arena is the tentative name of a planned 17,000-seat indoor arena being built in Henrico County, on the site of the former Best Products headquarters location.

== History ==
The $250 million arena will be constructed at the intersection of East Parham Road and Interstate 95. The arena construction is targeted for completion in 2026.

== See also ==
- Richmond Coliseum
- Hampton Roads Rhinos
- Virginia Beach Arena
