= Colleges and universities of Milwaukee =

Higher education in Milwaukee, Wisconsin is dominated by the University of Wisconsin–Milwaukee on the East Side and Marquette University, located near the city's center. Between no fewer than eleven higher education institutions, the city has a collective, full-time, degree seeking college student population exceeding approximately 70,000, the largest in Wisconsin. A January 2000 study from McGill University ranked Milwaukee 6th in a list of U.S. and Canadian cities with the highest number of college students per capita.

Also serving Milwaukee-area students are local campuses of Upper Iowa University and Ottawa University, which has a campus in Brookfield, Wisconsin.

== List of colleges and universities in Milwaukee ==
- Alverno College
- Cardinal Stritch University (Closed May 2023)
- Concordia University Wisconsin (Mequon Campus)
- Herzing University
- Lakeland University (West Allis/Milwaukee Campus)
- Marquette University
- Medical College of Wisconsin
- Milwaukee Area Technical College
- Milwaukee Institute of Art and Design
- Milwaukee School of Engineering
- Mount Mary University
- University of Wisconsin–Milwaukee
- Wisconsin Conservatory of Music
- Wisconsin Lutheran College
