= List of Kappa Mu Epsilon chapters =

Kappa Mu Epsilon is a collegiate honor society for mathematics. In the following list of chapters, active chapters are indicated in bold and inactive chapters are in italics.

Chapter	Charter date and range	Institution	Location	Status	Ref.
**Oklahoma Alpha**	April 18, 1931	Northeastern State University	Tahlequah, Oklahoma	Active	
**Iowa Alpha**	May 27, 1931	University of Northern Iowa	Cedar Falls, Iowa	Active	
**Kansas Alpha**	January 30, 1932	Pittsburg State University	Pittsburg, Kansas	Active	
**Missouri Alpha**	May 20, 1932	Missouri State University	Springfield, Missouri	Active	
**Mississippi Alpha**	May 30, 1932	Mississippi University for Women	Columbus, Mississippi	Active	
Mississippi Beta	December 14, 1932	Mississippi State University	Mississippi State, Mississippi	Inactive	
**Nebraska Alpha**	January 17, 1933	Wayne State College	Wayne, Nebraska	Active	
Illinois Alpha	January 26, 1933	Illinois State University	Normal, Illinois	Inactive	
**Kansas Beta**	May 12, 1934	Emporia State University	Emporia, Kansas	Active	
**Alabama Alpha**	March 5, 1935 – 1953	Athens State University	Athens, Alabama	Active	
**New Mexico Alpha**	March 28, 1935	University of New Mexico	Albuquerque, New Mexico	Active	
**Illinois Beta**	April 11, 1935	Eastern Illinois University	Charleston, Illinois	Active	
**Alabama Beta**	May 20, 1935	University of North Alabama	Florence, Alabama	Active	
Louisiana Alpha	May 9, 1936 – 1947	Louisiana State University	Baton Rouge, Louisiana	Inactive	
**Alabama Gamma**	April 24, 1937	University of Montevallo	Montevallo, Alabama	Active	
**Ohio Alpha**	April 24, 1937	Bowling Green State University	Bowling Green, Ohio	Active	
**Michigan Alpha**	May 29, 1937	Albion College	Albion, Michigan	Active	
**Missouri Beta**	June 10, 1938	University of Central Missouri	Warrensburg, Missouri	Active	
South Carolina Alpha	May 5, 1940	Coker College	Hartsville, South Carolina	Inactive	
Texas Alpha	May 10, 1940	Texas Tech University	Lubbock, Texas	Inactive	
Texas Beta	May 15, 1940	Southern Methodist University	Dallas, Texas	Inactive	
**Kansas Gamma**	May 26, 1940	Benedictine College	Atchison, Kansas	Active	
**Iowa Beta**	May 27, 1940	Drake University	Des Moines, Iowa	Active	
New Jersey Alpha	June 3, 1940	Upsala College	East Orange, New Jersey	Inactive	
Ohio Beta	April 12, 1941	College of Wooster	Wooster, Ohio	Inactive	
**Tennessee Alpha**	June 5, 1941	Tennessee Tech	Cookeville, Tennessee	Active	
New York Alpha	April 4, 1942	Hofstra University	Hempstead, New York	Inactive	
**Michigan Beta**	May 25, 1942	Central Michigan University	Mount Pleasant, Michigan	Active	
Illinois Gamma	June 19, 1942	Chicago Teachers College	Chicago, Illinois	Inactive	
**New Jersey Beta**	April 21, 1944	Montclair State University	Montclair, New Jersey	Active	
**Illinois Delta**	May 21, 1945	University of St. Francis	Joliet, Illinois	Active	
**Michigan Gamma**	May 10, 1946	Wayne State University	Detroit, Michigan	Active	
**Kansas Delta**	March 29, 1947	Washburn University	Topeka, Kansas	Active	
**Missouri Gamma**	May 7, 1947	William Jewell College	Liberty, Missouri	Active	
**Texas Gamma**	May 7, 1947	Texas Woman's University	Denton, Texas	Active	
**Wisconsin Alpha**	May 11, 1947	Mount Mary University	Milwaukee, Wisconsin	Active	
Texas Delta	May 13, 1947	Texas Christian University	Fort Worth, Texas	Inactive	
**Ohio Gamma**	June 6, 1947	Baldwin Wallace College	Berea, Ohio	Active	
Colorado Alpha	May 16, 1948	Colorado State University	Fort Collins, Colorado	Inactive	
Missouri Delta	May 26, 1948 – 1952	University of Missouri–Kansas City	Kansas City, Missouri	Inactive	
California Alpha	June 6, 1948	Pomona College	Claremont, California	Inactive	
**Missouri Epsilon**	May 18, 1949	Central Methodist University	Fayette, Missouri	Active	
**Mississippi Gamma**	May 21, 1949	University of Southern Mississippi	Hattiesburg, Mississippi	Active	
**Indiana Alpha**	May 16, 1950	Manchester University	North Manchester, Indiana	Active	
**Pennsylvania Alpha**	May 17, 1950	Westminster College	New Wilmington, Pennsylvania	Active	
North Carolina Alpha	January 12, 1951	Wake Forest University	Winston-Salem, North Carolina	Inactive	
Louisiana Beta	May 22, 1951	University of Southwestern Louisiana	Lafayette, Louisiana	Inactive	
Texas Epsilon	May 31, 1951	North Texas State University	Denton, Texas	Inactive	
**Indiana Beta**	May 16, 1952	Butler University	Indianapolis, Indiana	Active	
**Kansas Epsilon**	December 6, 1952	Fort Hays State University	Hays, Kansas	Active	
**Pennsylvania Beta**	May 19, 1953	La Salle University	Philadelphia, Pennsylvania	Active	
California Beta	May 28, 1954	Occidental College	Los Angeles, California	Inactive	
**Virginia Alpha**	January 29, 1955	Virginia State University	Petersburg, Virginia	Active	
**Indiana Gamma**	April 5, 1957	Anderson University	Anderson, Indiana	Active	
New York Beta	May 16, 1957	State University of New York at Albany	Albany, New York	Inactive	
**California Gamma**	May 23, 1958	California Polytechnic State University	San Luis Obispo, California	Active	
New York Gamma	May 21, 1959	State University of New York at Oswego	Oswego, New York	Inactive	
**Tennessee Beta**	May 22, 1959	East Tennessee State University	Johnson City, Tennessee	Active	
**Pennsylvania Gamma**	May 23, 1959	Waynesburg University	Waynesburg, Pennsylvania	Active	
**Virginia Beta**	November 12, 1959	Radford University	Radford, Virginia	Active	
**Nebraska Beta**	December 11, 1959	University of Nebraska at Kearney	Kearney, Nebraska	Active	
Ohio Delta	April 28, 1960	Wittenburg University	Springfield, Ohio	Inactive	
Florida Alpha	May 26, 1960	John B. Stetson University	DeLand, Florida	Inactive	
**Indiana Delta**	May 27, 1960	University of Evansville	Evansville, Indiana	Active	
**Ohio Epsilon**	October 29, 1960	Marietta College	Marietta, Ohio	Active	
Alabama Delta	February 10, 1961	Howard College	Birmingham, Alabama	Inactive	
New York Delta	April 13, 1961	Utica College of Syracuse University	Utica, New York	Inactive	
**Missouri Zeta**	May 19, 1961	Missouri University of Science and Technology	Rolla, Missouri	Active	
New York Epsilon	February 27, 1962	Ladycliff College	Highland Falls, New York	Inactive	
**Nebraska Gamma**	May 19, 1962	Chadron State College	Chadron, Nebraska	Active	
Illinois Epsilon	May 22, 1963	North Park University	Chicago, Illinois	Inactive	
**Maryland Alpha**	May 22, 1963	Notre Dame of Maryland University	Baltimore, Maryland	Active	
Oklahoma Beta	May 3, 1964	University of Tulsa	Tulsa, Oklahoma	Inactive	
**California Delta**	November 5, 1964	California State Polytechnic University, Pomona	Pomona, California	Active	
**Pennsylvania Delta**	November 8, 1964	Marywood University	Scranton, Pennsylvania	Active	
**Pennsylvania Epsilon**	April 3, 1965	Kutztown University of Pennsylvania	Kutztown, Pennsylvania	Active	
**Pennsylvania Zeta**	May 6, 1965	Indiana University of Pennsylvania	Indiana, Pennsylvania	Active	
**Alabama Epsilon**	May 15, 1965	Huntingdon College	Montgomery, Alabama	Active	
Arkansas Alpha	May 21, 1965	Arkansas State University	State University, Arkansas	Inactive	
**Tennessee Gamma**	May 24, 1965	Union University	Jackson, Tennessee	Active	
**Iowa Gamma**	May 25, 1965	Morningside University	Sioux City, Iowa	Active	
Wisconsin Beta	May 25, 1965	University of Wisconsin–River Falls	River Falls, Wisconsin	Inactive	
**Maryland Beta**	May 30, 1965	McDaniel College	Westminster, Maryland	Active	
New York Zeta	May 16, 1966	Colgate University	Hamilton, New York	Inactive	
**Illinois Zeta**	February 26, 1967	Dominican University	River Forest, Illinois	Active	
**South Carolina Beta**	May 6, 1967	South Carolina State University	Orangeburg, South Carolina	Active	
**Pennsylvania Eta**	May 13, 1967	Grove City College	Grove City, Pennsylvania	Active	
Texas Zeta	May 14, 1967	Tarleton State College	Stephenville, Texas	Inactive	
Connecticut Alpha	May 29, 1967	Southern Connecticut State University	New Haven, Connecticut	Inactive	
**New York Eta**	May 18, 1968	Niagara University	Lewiston, New York	Active	
**Massachusetts Alpha**	November 19, 1968	Assumption University	Worcester, Massachusetts	Active	
**Missouri Eta**	December 7, 1968	Truman State University	Kirksville, Missouri	Active	
**Ohio Zeta**	May 17, 1969	Muskingum University	New Concord, Ohio	Active	
**Illinois Eta**	May 19, 1969	Western Illinois University	Macomb, Illinois	Active	
**Pennsylvania Theta**	May 26, 1969	Susquehanna University	Selinsgrove, Pennsylvania	Active	
New York Theta	October 24, 1969	St. Francis College	Brooklyn, New York	Inactive	
**Pennsylvania Iota**	November 1, 1969	Shippensburg University of Pennsylvania	Shippensburg, Pennsylvania	Active	
Maryland Gamma	December 6, 1970	Saint Joseph College	Emmitsburg, Maryland	Inactive	
**Mississippi Delta**	December 17, 1970	William Carey University	Hattiesburg, Mississippi	Active	
**Missouri Theta**	January 12, 1971	Evangel University	Springfield, Missouri	Active	
**Pennsylvania Kappa**	January 23, 1971	Holy Family University	Philadelphia, Pennsylvania	Active	
**Colorado Beta**	March 4, 1971	Colorado School of Mines	Golden, Colorado	Active	
**Kentucky Alpha**	March 27, 1971	Eastern Kentucky University	Richmond, Kentucky	Active	
**Tennessee Delta**	May 15, 1971	Carson–Newman University	Jefferson City, Tennessee	Active	
**New York Iota**	May 19, 1971	Wagner College	Staten Island, New York	Active	
**South Carolina Gamma**	November 3, 1972	Winthrop University	Rock Hill, South Carolina	Active	
**Iowa Delta**	April 6, 1973	Wartburg College	Waverly, Iowa	Active	
**Oklahoma Gamma**	May 1, 1973	Southwestern Oklahoma State University	Weatherford, Oklahoma	Active	
**Pennsylvania Lambda**	October 17, 1973	Bloomsburg University of Pennsylvania	Bloomsburg, Pennsylvania	Active	
**New York Kappa**	April 24, 1974	Pace University	New York City, New York	Active	
**Texas Eta**	May 3, 1975	Hardin–Simmons University	Abilene, Texas	Active	
**Missouri Iota**	May 8, 1975	Missouri Southern State University	Joplin, Missouri	Active	
**Georgia Alpha**	May 21, 1975	University of West Georgia	Carrollton, Georgia	Active	
**West Virginia Alpha**	May 21, 1975	Bethany College	Bethany, West Virginia	Active	
North Carolina Beta	June 4, 1975	Western Carolina University	Cullowhee, North Carolina	Inactive	
**Florida Beta**	October 31, 1976	Florida Southern College	Lakeland, Florida	Active	
**Wisconsin Gamma**	February 4, 1978	University of Wisconsin–Eau Claire	Eau Claire, Wisconsin	Active	
**Maryland Delta**	September 17, 1978	Frostburg State University	Frostburg, Maryland	Active	
**Illinois Theta**	May 18, 1979	Benedictine University	Lisle, Illinois	Active	
**Pennsylvania Mu**	September 14, 1979	Saint Francis University	Loretto, Pennsylvania	Active	
North Carolina Gamma	May 3, 1990	Elon University	Elon, North Carolina	Inactive	
Texas Theta	April 25, 1980	Southwest Texas State University	San Marcos, Texas	Inactive	
**Alabama Zeta**	February 18, 1981	Birmingham–Southern College	Birmingham, Alabama	Active	
**Connecticut Beta**	May 2, 1981	Eastern Connecticut State University	Willimantic, Connecticut	Active	
**New York Lambda**	May 2, 1983	LIU Post	Brookville, New York	Active	
**Missouri Kappa**	November 30, 1984	Drury University	Springfield, Missouri	Active	
**Colorado Gamma**	March 29, 1985	Fort Lewis College	Durango, Colorado	Active	
**Nebraska Delta**	April 18, 1986	Nebraska Wesleyan University	Lincoln, Nebraska	Active	
**Texas Iota**	April 25, 1987	McMurry University	Abilene, Texas	Active	
**Pennsylvania Nu**	April 28, 1987	Ursinus College	Collegeville, Pennsylvania	Active	
**Virginia Gamma**	April 30, 1987	Liberty University	Lynchburg, Virginia	Active	
**New York Mu**	May 14, 1987	St. Thomas Aquinas College	Sparkill, New York	Active	
**Ohio Eta**	December 15, 1987	Ohio Northern University	Ada, Ohio	Active	
**Oklahoma Delta**	April 10, 1990	Oral Roberts University	Tulsa, Oklahoma	Active	
**Colorado Delta**	April 27, 1990	Colorado Mesa University	Grand Junction, Colorado	Active	
**Pennsylvania Xi**	October 30, 1990	Cedar Crest College	Allentown, Pennsylvania	Active	
**Missouri Lambda**	February 10, 1991	Missouri Western State University	St. Joseph, Missouri	Active	
**Texas Kappa**	February 21, 1991	University of Mary Hardin–Baylor	Belton, Texas	Active	
**South Carolina Delta**	April 28, 1991	Erskine College	Due West, South Carolina	Active	
South Dakota Alpha	May 3, 1992	Northern State University	Aberdeen, South Dakota	Inactive	
**New York Nu**	May 14, 1992	Hartwick College	Oneonta, New York	Active	
**New Hampshire Alpha**	February 16, 1993	Keene State College	Keene, New Hampshire	Active	
**Louisiana Gamma**	March 24, 1993	Northwestern State University	Natchitoches, Louisiana	Active	
**Kentucky Beta**	May 3, 1993	University of the Cumberlands	Williamsburg, Kentucky	Active	
**Mississippi Epsilon**	November 19, 1994	Delta State University	Cleveland, Mississippi	Active	
**Pennsylvania Omicron**	April 10, 1997	University of Pittsburgh at Johnstown	Johnstown, Pennsylvania	Active	
**Michigan Delta**	April 30, 1997	Hillsdale College	Hillsdale, Michigan	Active	
**Michigan Epsilon**	March 28, 1998	Kettering University	Flint, Michigan	Active	
**Kansas Zeta**	April 14, 1998	Southwestern College	Winfield, Kansas	Active	
Tennessee Epsilon	April 16, 1998	Bethel University	McKenzie, Tennessee	Inactive	
**Georgia Beta**	April 25, 1998	Georgia College & State University	Milledgeville, Georgia	Active	
**Missouri Mu**	April 25, 1998	Harris–Stowe State University	St. Louis, Missouri	Active	
**Alabama Eta**	May 4, 1998	University of West Alabama	Livingston, Alabama	Active	
**New York Xi**	May 12, 1998	Buffalo State University	Buffalo, New York	Active	
**North Carolina Delta**	March 24, 1999	High Point University	High Point, North Carolina	Active	
**Pennsylvania Pi**	April 19, 1999	Slippery Rock University	Slippery Rock, Pennsylvania	Active	
**Texas Lambda**	November 22, 1999	Trinity University	San Antonio, Texas	Active	
**Georgia Gamma**	April 7, 2000	Piedmont College	Demorest, Georgia	Active	
**Louisiana Delta**	February 11, 2001	University of Louisiana at Monroe	Monroe, Louisiana	Active	
**Georgia Delta**	April 21, 2001	Berry College	Mount Berry, Georgia	Active	
**Texas Mu**	April 28, 2001	Schreiner University	Kerrville, Texas	Active	
New Jersey Gamma	April 21, 2002	Monmouth University	West Long Branch, New Jersey	Inactive	
**California Epsilon**	April 21, 2003	California Baptist University	Riverside, California	Active	
Texas Nu	January 1, 2004	Texas A&M University–Corpus Christi	Corpus Christi, Texas	Inactive	
**Pennsylvania Rho**	February 13, 2004	Thiel College	Greenville, Pennsylvania	Active	
**Virginia Delta**	March 26, 2004	Marymount University	Arlington, Virginia	Active	
**New York Omicron**	May 1, 2004	St. Joseph's University	Patchogue, New York	Active	
**Illinois Iota**	February 26, 2005	Lewis University	Romeoville, Illinois	Active	
**West Virginia Beta**	March 11, 2005	Wheeling University	Wheeling, West Virginia	Active	
**South Carolina Epsilon**	March 18, 2005	Francis Marion University	Florence, South Carolina	Active	
**Pennsylvania Sigma**	April 1, 2005	Lycoming College	Williamsport, Pennsylvania	Active	
**Missouri Nu**	April 29, 2005	Columbia College	Columbia, Missouri	Active	
**Maryland Epsilon**	December 3, 2005	Stevenson University	Stevenson, Maryland	Active	
**New Jersey Delta**	December 1, 2006	Centenary University	Hackettstown, New Jersey	Active	
**New York Pi**	March 20, 2007	Mount Saint Mary College	Newburgh, New York	Active	
**Oklahoma Epsilon**	April 20, 2007	Oklahoma Christian University	Oklahoma City, Oklahoma	Active	
**Hawaii Alpha**	October 22, 2007	Hawaii Pacific University	Honolulu, Hawaii	Active	
**North Carolina Epsilon**	March 24, 2008	North Carolina Wesleyan University	Rocky Mount, North Carolina	Active	
California Zeta	April 4, 2009	Simpson University	Redding, California	Inactive	
**New York Rho**	April 21, 2009	Molloy University	Rockville Center, New York	Active	
**North Carolina Zeta**	September 17, 2009	Catawba College	Salisbury, North Carolina	Active	
**Rhode Island Alpha**	November 13, 2009	Roger Williams University	Bristol, Rhode Island	Active	
**New Jersey Epsilon**	February 22, 2010	New Jersey City University	Jersey City, New Jersey	Active	
**North Carolina Eta**	March 18, 2010	Johnson C. Smith University	Charlotte, North Carolina	Active	
**Alabama Theta**	March 29, 2010	Jacksonville State University	Jacksonville, Alabama	Active	
**Georgia Epsilon**	March 30, 2010	Wesleyan College	Macon, Georgia	Active	
**Florida Gamma**	March 31, 2010	Southeastern University	Lakeland, Florida	Active	
**Massachusetts Beta**	April 8, 2011	Stonehill College	North Easton, Massachusetts	Active	
**Arkansas Beta**	January 29, 2012	Henderson State University	Arkadelphia, Arkansas	Active	
**Pennsylvania Tau**	April 29, 2012	DeSales University	Center Valley, Pennsylvania	Active	
**Tennessee Zeta**	November 1, 2012	Lee University	Cleveland, Tennessee	Active	
**Rhode Island Beta**	April 3, 2013	Bryant University	Smithfield, Rhode Island	Active	
**South Dakota Beta**	September 20, 2013	Black Hills State University	Spearfish, South Dakota	Active	
**Florida Delta**	April 22, 2014	Embry–Riddle Aeronautical University, Daytona Beach	Daytona Beach, Florida	Active	
**Iowa Epsilon**	April 30, 2014	Central College	Pella, Iowa	Active	
**California Eta**	March 18, 2015	Fresno Pacific University	Fresno, California	Active	
**Ohio Theta**	April 24, 2015	Capital University	Columbus, Ohio	Active	
**Georgia Zeta**	April 28, 2015	Georgia Gwinnett College	Lawrenceville, Georgia	Active	
**Missouri Xi**	February 17, 2016	William Woods University	Fulton, Missouri	Active	
**Illinois Kappa**	May 3, 2016	Aurora University	Aurora, Illinois	Active	
**Georgia Eta**	January 1, 2017	Atlanta Metropolitan State College	Atlanta, Georgia	Active	
**Connecticut Gamma**	March 24, 2017	Central Connecticut State University	New Britain, Connecticut	Active	
**Kansas Eta**	November 30, 2017	Sterling College	Sterling, Kansas	Active	
**New York Sigma**	April 30, 2018	College of Mount Saint Vincent	The Bronx, New York	Active	
**Pennsylvania Upsilon**	May 18, 2018	Seton Hill University	Greensburg, Pennsylvania	Active	
**Kentucky Gamma**	April 23, 2019	Bellarmine University	Louisville, Kentucky	Active	
**Minnesota Alpha**	April 20, 2020	Metropolitan State University	Saint Paul, Minnesota	Active	
**Missouri Omicron**	November 13, 2020	Rockhurst University	Kansas City, Missouri	Active	
**Arkansas Gamma**	April 27, 2021	Harding University	Searcy, Arkansas	Active	
**Georgia Theta**	October 22, 2021	College of Coastal Georgia	Brunswick, Georgia	Active	
**California Theta**	October 17, 2022	Jessup University	Rocklin, California	Active	
**Arkansas Delta**	March 6, 2025	Ouachita Baptist University	Arkadelphia, Arkansas	Active	
