= George Shinn =

American former NBA team owner

- Born: May 11, 1941 (age 85); Kannapolis, North Carolina, U.S.
- Known for: Former owner of the Charlotte / New Orleans Hornets
- Spouse: Megan

George Shinn (born May 11, 1941) is an American businessman. He is the former owner of the Charlotte/New Orleans Hornets, as well as the Charlotte Knights and Gastonia Rangers minor league baseball teams, along with the Raleigh–Durham Skyhawks, of the World League of American Football. He purchased the Hornets for $32.5 million in 1987. In 1997, he lost his bid for a potential National Hockey League (NHL) expansion franchise to be called the Hampton Roads Rhinos.

== Early life and education ==
Shinn was born in Kannapolis, North Carolina and attended A. L. Brown High School.

== Career ==
Shinn worked in a textile mill, a car wash, and as a school janitor. He later attended Evans Business College in Concord, North Carolina while working with real estate and car dealerships. Upon graduating, he raised enough money to buy Evans and other small colleges that offered 18-24 month programs, consolidating them all under the umbrella company Rutledge Education Systems. He sold the schools and bought the basketball team with the proceeds.

== Sexual assault trial and departure of team to New Orleans ==
Shinn was accused of kidnapping and sexually assaulting a Charlotte woman. A jury rejected the claims at trial in December 1999, but Shinn admitted in court to having two sexual relationships outside of his marriage, which damaged his reputation. The trial was broadcast nationwide on Court TV and drew some of the cable network's highest ratings at the time.

The trial and his subsequent tarnished reputation was one of the key reasons for the move from Charlotte to New Orleans.

=== Hornets buyout ===
In April 2010, Shinn started considering selling his majority share of the Hornets to Gary Chouest, who had bought 25% of the team. The negotiations stalled due to the team's financial issues. Because Shinn was not in a financial position to continue to run the team, the NBA was expected to purchase and run the team while looking for a local owner. The NBA completed its purchase of the Hornets from George Shinn and Gary Chouest in December 2010 for an estimated $300 million.

== Personal life ==
Shinn is married to Megan Shinn and has three children from his first marriage. One of his children is Chris Shinn. He was the lead singer of the rock band Live from March 2012 until December 2016, and is more known for his work with Unified Theory and his own solo albums.

In November 2009 Shinn announced he had prostate cancer. By March 2010, after several months of treatment, he announced he was cancer-free. Shinn also survived a stroke suffered early in the Hornets' inaugural season.

Although Shinn later relinquished control of the Hornets and retired, he is still hated in Charlotte for moving the team to New Orleans. Shinn has not returned to Charlotte since the Hornets left for New Orleans in 2002. In a 2008 interview with The Charlotte Observer, Shinn admitted that the drama over his personal life was a factor in the Hornets leaving town. He also said that if he had it to do all over again, he would not have withdrawn from public view as he did after the sexual assault trial. The George Shinn Foundation was founded in 1973. Megan Shinn, George's wife, serves as the Foundation's president.

== Net worth ==
In 2010 the former New Orleans Hornets owner had an estimated net worth of $100 million.

== Awards and honors ==
- 2009 – Weiss Award (New Orleans Council for Community and Justice)
- 2009 – American Red Cross Humanitarian of the Year (New Orleans chapter)
- 1975 Horatio Alger Award. The youngest ever (at the time) at 34.

== Writings ==
Shinn is the author of half a dozen books including The Miracle of Motivation, The American Dream Still Works, and You Gotta Believe! The Story of the Charlotte Hornets.

Sporting positions
New creation	Charlotte Hornets owner 1988–2002	Succeeded by Robert L. Johnson as Charlotte Bobcats
New creation	New Orleans Hornets owner 2002–2010	Succeeded by Tom Benson
