= Virginia Beach Arena =

Proposed sports arena in Virginia, U.S.

- Interactive map of Virginia Beach Arena
- Location: Virginia Beach, Virginia
- Coordinates: 36°50′41″N 75°59′23″W
- Capacity: Approx. 18,000

Construction
- Closed: November 2016
- Cost: US$210 million (infrastructure $52 million)

Virginia Beach Arena was a proposed multi-purpose entertainment and sports arena adjacent to the Virginia Beach Convention Center on 19th Street in the oceanfront resort area, one block from Interstate-264 in Virginia Beach, Virginia.

The facility was to be privately owned and financed with an approximate size of 500,000 square feet and an 18,000 seat capacity. In late 2016, the proposed arena was cancelled by the City of Virginia Beach. This resulted in a court case between the city and the arena's planned builders, with a judge ruling that the city did not breach any contracts, saying they had "acted in good faith" when cancelling the project.

The arena was projected to host events including major concerts, ice shows, trade shows, monster truck rallies, circuses and sporting events. It was to include NCAA/NBA/NHL-ready core features to enable future support of collegiate tournaments and a professional sports franchise.

The developer contended that many major events currently bypass Hampton Roads because existing indoor venues, with lower seating capacities, are too small and lack the necessary staging capabilities for large-scale performances. The proposed Virginia Beach Arena would have been the largest in Virginia capable of staging these events.

Projected to employ hundreds of full and part-time staff, the Arena's estimated cost was $210 million. The Virginia General Assembly passed legislation that allows the City to dedicate its portion of the Arena-generated state sales tax to satisfy project-related debt. In addition, the City of Virginia Beach, under a plan yet negotiated, will return "but for" taxes generated by admissions, food & beverage, and merchandise sales, as well as 1% of the existing hotel tax.

The City of Virginia Beach was expected to contribute approximately $52 million to create the infrastructure needed to directly support the Arena. The City would finance this through its existing Tourism Investment Project (TIP) fund.

Construction was estimated to take two years after the necessary agreements and permits were put in place.

== 2025 revival ==
In 2025, a new proposal was submitted by Coleman Ferguson, owner of Virginia Beach Arena Corporation, to construct a 20,000 seat arena named Neptune's Pinnacle, with a target opening in 2028. Unlike the original plan, the updated project is entirely privately funded through a combination of institutional capital and Regulation A+ crowdfunding. The developers submitted a formal proposal to the city in July 2025, seeking only a long-term lease for city-owned land near the Convention Center. The project also aims to attract a professional sports franchise to Virginia Beach, one of the largest U.S. metro areas without a major team.

== See also ==
- Hampton Roads Rhinos
