= Richmond Coliseum =

Abandoned arena in Virginia, United States

Coordinates: 37.544705°N 77.434484°W

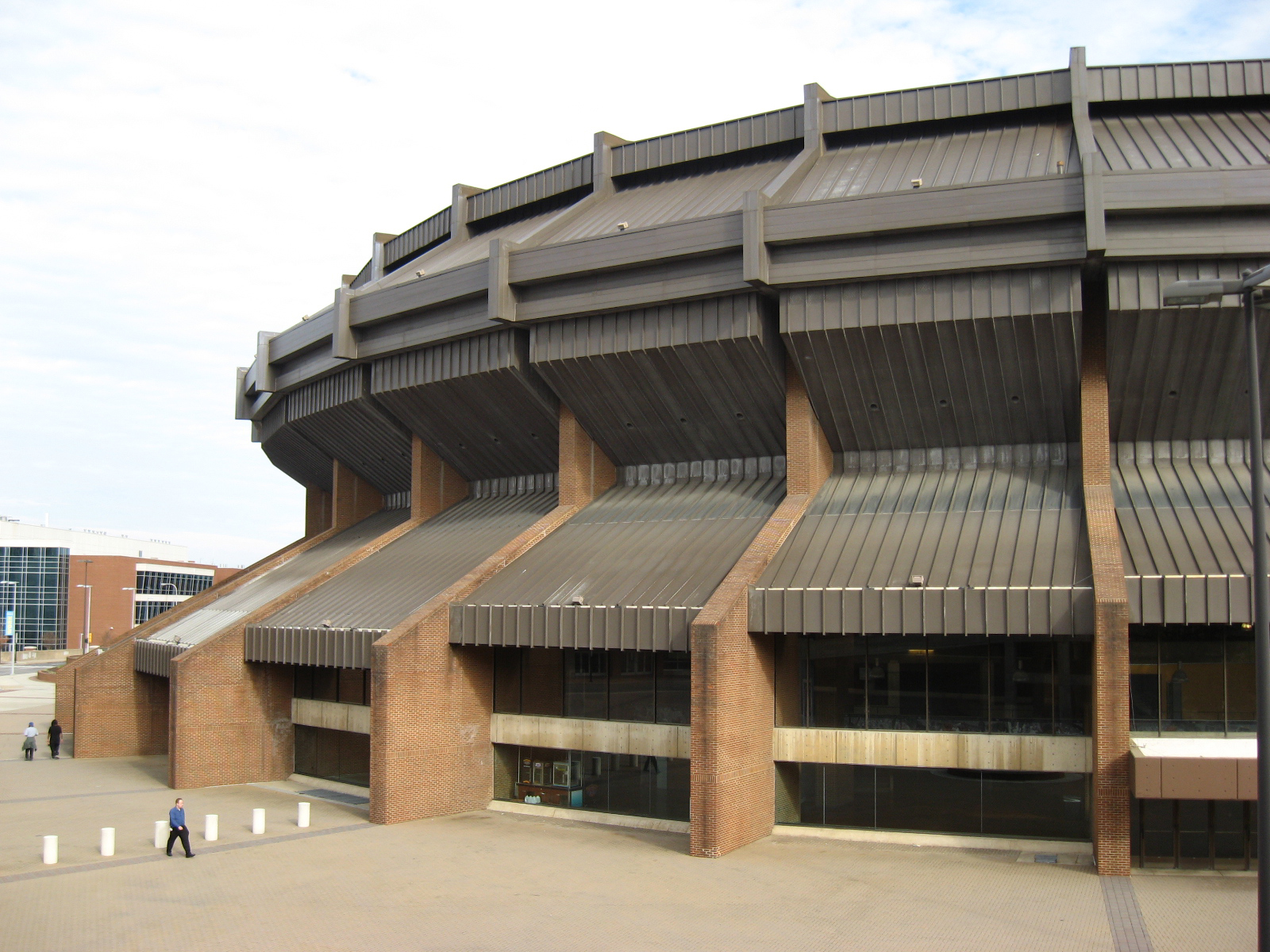
- Interactive map of Richmond Coliseum
- Location: 601 East Leigh Street; Richmond, Virginia, 23219
- Owner: City of Richmond, Virginia
- Operator: SMG
- Capacity: 13,553 (concerts); 11,992 (basketball); 11,088 (hockey)

Construction
- Groundbreaking: 1969
- Opened: August 21, 1971
- Closed: 2019
- Cost: $24 million ($211 million in 2025 dollars)
- Architect: Vincent G. Kling and Associates

Tenants
- Virginia Squires (ABA) (1971–1976) part time Richmond Robins (AHL) (1971–1976); VCU Rams (CAA) (1971–1999); Richmond Spiders (SoCon) (1971–1972); Richmond Rifles (EHL) (1979–1981); Richmond Renegades (ECHL) (1990–2003); Richmond Speed (AF2) (2000–2003); Richmond RiverDogs (UHL) (2003–2006); Richmond Bandits (AIFL) (2005–2006); Richmond Renegades (SPHL) (2006–2009); Richmond Raiders (AIFA/SIFL/PIFL) (2010–2015); Richmond Roughriders (APF/AAL) (2017–2018)

Richmond Coliseum is a defunct arena located in downtown Richmond, Virginia, with a capacity of 13,500 that was most often used for various large concerts. The arena opened in 1971 and the region is looking to replace the aging facility with a larger one. The arena was quietly shuttered in February 2019 while new proposed replacements are in development.

== History ==
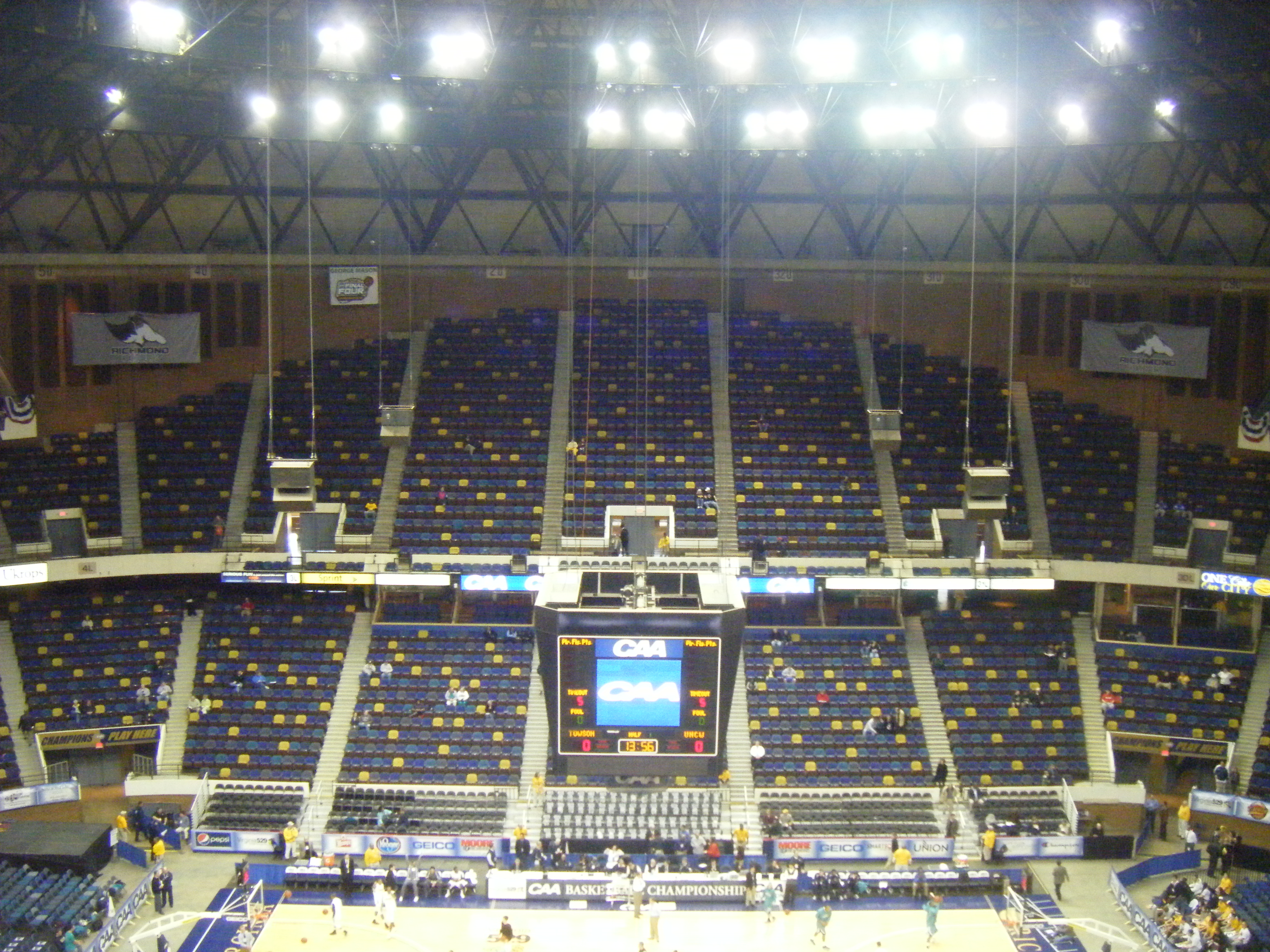
Interior of arena, 2010

Until John Paul Jones Arena opened in 2006, the Richmond Coliseum was the largest sports arena in Virginia. The Virginia Commonwealth University Rams men's basketball team played in the arena until the 7,500-seat Siegel Center opened on the VCU campus in 1999.

Elvis Presley performed a concert at the coliseum on April 10, 1972, with footage being used in the film Elvis on Tour which documented Presley's spring tour of that year.

The Richmond Coliseum was the former part-time home of the Virginia Squires of the American Basketball Association. The Squires played there in addition to Roanoke Civic Center, Norfolk Scope and Hampton Coliseum (all within the Commonwealth of Virginia) from 1970 until just before the ABA–NBA merger in 1976. The Coliseum also hosted the Southern Conference men's basketball tournaments in 1973 and 1974.

The Sun Belt Conference men's basketball tournament was held there in 1988. The Colonial Athletic Association men's (NCAA) collegiate basketball tournament has been contested at the Richmond Coliseum from 1990 to 2013. On March 1, 2006, a deal was signed to keep the tournament in Richmond until 2012. The Coliseum served as the primary home for the MEAC men's basketball tournament between 1998 and 2005, with some games played at the Arthur Ashe Athletic Center.

In 1994, the Coliseum hosted the Women's NCAA Division I Basketball Championship. Charlotte Smith of North Carolina sank a buzzer-beating three-pointer to defeat Louisiana Tech, 60–59, in the final. The Richmond Coliseum also held the men's Division I NCAA Tournament first and second rounds in 1990 and 1996.

In 1997, a transformer fire caused electrical problems and forced events to be canceled or postponed that year.

It has been a regular stop for professional wrestling promotions through the years, including the old NWA (Jim Crockett Promotions) Mid-Atlantic territory, and more recently, WWE. In recent years, it hosted the fifteenth WWF In Your House 15: A Cold Day in Hell pay-per-view in 1997, WWE Armageddon on December 17, 2006, and hosted the televised portion of the 2010 WWE Draft. It held WWE Friday Night SmackDown on November 16, 2010. It held WWE Raw on Monday, June 6, 2011, featuring WWE Hall of Famer Steve Austin to announce the winner of WWE Tough Enough. It also held Monday Night Raw again May 21, 2012, immediately following Over the Limit in which John Cena lost a match against John Laurinaitis, with Laurinaitis only winning after The Big Show intervened. It also held WWE Friday Night SmackDown on December 30, 2012, the final WWE event of the year. It hosted the December 30th, 2013, the July 14, 2014 and the May 18, 2015 editions of Raw. On September 11, 2016, it hosted the return of Backlash. On May 21, 2018, it hosted WWE Monday Night RAW. It was the last show held at the arena before its closure.

The Coliseum has also been a site for the Professional Bull Riders. From 1997 to 1999, a Bud Light Cup Series event known as the Lane Frost Memorial was held in the Coliseum; the PBR returned in 2007 to host minor-league tour stops sponsored by former bull rider Greg Potter.

On October 22, 2008, it hosted a rally for presidential candidate Barack Obama, drawing over 13,000 people. A similar crowd was drawn for the 2009 Republican Party of Virginia convention.

The arena closed in February 2019, with the last event having been a Harlem Globetrotters basketball game on December 29, 2018, but it has not been demolished while several proposed redevelopment projects to replace the Coliseum are discussed.

== Redevelopment ==
In 2016, the Virginia General Assembly passed a bill, signed by governor Terry McAuliffe, authorizing the Richmond Metropolitan Transportation Authority to build a replacement, as a way to get regional cooperation.

The Richmond Coliseum, alongside the Blues Armory and Sixth Street Marketplace, are all abandoned. All three structures are being redeveloped into a mixed-use district called Richmond City Center, which involves demolition of the Richmond Coliseum, which has been closed and abandoned since 2019. The redevelopment plan was announced in 2021.

The City of Richmond's Economic Development Authority (EDA) has been soliciting five proposals sent from developers in December 2022 to purchase and redevelop the 9.4-acre (3.8 ha) site, and it involves adaptive reuse of historic structures like the Blues Armory, new streetscapes, housing, and improved pedestrian access. The City Center redevelopment aims to create a vibrant, walkable urban area, learning from past mistakes of the failure of Sixth Street Marketplace to build a sustainable downtown destination.

In late October 2025, the Greater Richmond Convention Center Authority (GRCCA) began pursuing updated cost estimates and environmental studies to prepare for the teardown of the Coliseum. On June 1, 2026, the timeline was aggressively updated. The main priority pushed by Mayor Danny Avula was to tear down the Coliseum by "this year." A $15 million state funding package was allocated specifically to cover the city's demolition and site preparation costs. The timeline was also altered to separate it from the parallel Greater Richmond Transit Company (GRTC) plans for the Downtown Transfer Hub at the nearby former Public Safety Building site.

== Layout ==
The Richmond (RVA) Coliseum is laid out on six levels. In order from lowest to highest they are the event level, the mezzanine, the lower concourse, the upper concourse, the 300 level and the ring. The event level is where the event floor (and ice rink) was located, as well as all the support rooms for events and the building. Team locker rooms, star dressing rooms, exhibition halls, the Coliseum Club and the kitchens were located on the event level. The Clay Street tunnel, one of the innovative features of the Coliseum, is on the event level and allowed vehicles, including tractor trailers and monster trucks, to pull into the Coliseum. It is accessed at the intersection of Clay Street and Eighth Street. The tunnel provided storage for shows and parking for Coliseum personnel. The mezzanine was where the administrative offices for the Coliseum were located. The Leigh Street entrance is on this level. The lower concourse is the access for all lower-level seating and suites. The Fifth Street and Sixth Street entrances are located on this level, as well as exits to the areas above Clay Street and Leigh Street. The upper concourse is the access for all upper-level seating and the 300 level is access to the highest seats on either radius of the Coliseum. The ring is where the spotlights are operated and is the access to the catwalk.

== See also ==
- GreenCity Arena
