= Gutchess College (Connecticut) =

Defunct business college in Connecticut, US

Gutchess College was a business college in Bridgeport, Connecticut, USA. It was founded as Brown's Business College in 1896 with a focus on typing, stenography, telegraphy and bookkeeping. It was later purchased by Stephen D. Gutchess who in 1911 was operating the school with an annual enrollment of about 500. It was still operating in 1920.
