= Institute of Design and Construction =

Former technical college in New York City

Coordinates: 40°41′32.24″N 73°58′59.07″W

Institute of Design and Construction (IDC), was a non-profit technical college located in Brooklyn, New York, that was founded in 1947 and closed in 2015. Its founder was Vito P. Battista, a first generation Italian-American architect, civic leader and member of the New York State Assembly from 1969 to 1974.

IDC offered Associate degrees in Building Construction Technology and Architectural Design Technology as well as a variety of continuing and professional education courses. It was registered by the New York State Department of Education, but due to declining student enrollment and accreditation concerns by the New York State Board of Regents, IDC voluntarily ceased operations in July 2015.

== See also ==
- List of defunct colleges and universities in New York
