= List of defunct colleges and universities in New York (state) =

This page includes colleges and universities that have closed in New York state. Since 2015, at least 20 colleges have closed in the state of New York.

== Institutions ==
School	Location(s)	Affiliation	Type	Founded	Closed	Notes
Alliance Theological Seminary	New York City and Nyack	Christian and Missionary Alliance	seminary	1974	2023	
Alliance University	New York City and Nyack	Christian and Missionary Alliance	master's university	1882	2023	formerly Nyack College
Art Institute of Buffalo	Buffalo	Private non-profit	art school	1931	1956	
ASA College	New York City (Manhattan and Downtown Brooklyn)	Private for-profit	baccalaureate college	1985	2023	
Auburn Theological Seminary	Auburn	Presbyterian	seminary	1818	1939	Still exists as a non-degree granting 501(c)(3) located in the Interchurch Center in New York City.
Barleywood Female University	Rochester	Private non-profit	women's college	1852	1853	
Bennett College	Millbrook	Private non-profit	women's college	1890	1977	
Briarcliff College	Briarcliff Manor	Private non-profit	women's college	1904	1977	
Briarcliffe College	New York City (Long Island City)/Bethpage/Patchogue	Private for-profit	baccalaureate college	1966	2018	
Bramson ORT College	Forest Hills	World ORT	junior college	1979	2017	
Cathedral College of the Immaculate Conception	New York City (Brooklyn) (1914–1967); Douglaston (1967–1987)	Roman Catholic	seminary	1914	1987	
Cazenovia College	Cazenovia	Private non-profit	baccalaureate college	1824	2023	Later served as a police academy site for New York State Police from 2023 to 2025
Christie's Education	New York City	Private for-profit	graduate school	1993	2020	
College of Insurance	New York City	Private non-profit	master's university	1901	2001	Merged into St. John's University
College of New Rochelle	New Rochelle	Roman Catholic	master's university	1904	2019	Merged into Mercy University
College of Saint Rose	Albany	Roman Catholic	master's university	1920	2024	
Concordia College	Bronxville	Lutheran Church–Missouri Synod	master's university	1881	2021	
Digital Film Academy	New York City (Manhattan)	Private for-profit	art and design college	2001	2024	
Dowling College	Oakdale	Private non-profit	master's university	1968	2016	
Eastman Business College	Poughkeepsie	Private for-profit	business college	1859	1931	
Eisenhower College	Seneca Falls	Private non-profit	liberal arts college	1968	1982	Merged into Rochester Institute of Technology
Falley Seminary	Fulton, Oswego County	Presbyterian	women's seminary; later seminary	1836	1883	
Finch College	New York City	Private non-profit	women's college	1952	1976	
Genesee Wesleyan Seminary	Lima	Methodist Episcopal Church	seminary	1831	1941	closed; campus now houses Elim Bible College
Gibbs College	New York City/Melville	Private for-profit	baccalaureate college	1911	2009	
Glasgow Caledonian New York College	New York City	Private non-profit	graduate school	2013	2023	IE University took over building for a New York campus.
Globe Institute of Technology	New York City (Manhattan)	Private for-profit	baccalaureate college	1985	2016	
Harlem Hospital School of Nursing	New York City	Public	nursing school	1923	1977	
Ingham University	Le Roy	Private non-profit	women's college	1836	1892	
Institute of Design and Construction	New York City (Brooklyn)	Private non-profit	technical college	1947	2015	
Jamestown Business College	Jamestown	Private for-profit	business college	1886	2025	
The King's College	New York City	non-denominational Christian	liberal arts college	1938	2025	
Kirkland College	Clinton	Private non-profit	women's liberal arts college	1965	1978	Merged into Hamilton College
Ladycliffe College	Highland Falls	Roman Catholic	baccalaureate college	1933	1980	United States Military Academy at West Point acquired the property, and it is the location of the West Point Museum.
Lincoln School for Nurses	New York City	Private non-profit	nursing school	1898	1961	
Long Island Business Institute	New York City (Flushing)/Commack	Private for-profit	junior college	1968	2024	
Long Island College Hospital School of Nursing	New York City (Brooklyn)	Private non-profit	nursing school	1899	2011	
Maria Regina College	Syracuse	Roman Catholic	junior college	1934	1990	
Marymount College	Tarrytown	Roman Catholic	baccalaureate college	1907	2007	Merged into Fordham University in 2000; closed in 2007
Marymount Manhattan College	New York City	Private non-profit, formerly Roman Catholic	baccalaureate college	1936	2026	Merged into Northeastern University
Medaille University	Buffalo	Private non-profit	master's university	1937	2023	
New York Career Institute	New York City	Private for-profit	trade school	1941	2017	
New York Central College	McGraw	Baptist	baccalaureate college	1849	1860	
New York Hydropathic and Physiological School	New York City	Hydrotherapy	medical school	1853	1875	Moved to Florence, New Jersey in 1869
New York Conservatory for Dramatic Arts	New York City (Manhattan)	Private non-profit	drama school	1980	2025	
New York Theological Seminary	New York City (Manhattan)	Non-denominational progressive Christian	seminary	1900	2024	
Notre Dame College	Staten Island	Roman Catholic	baccalaureate college	1933	1971	merged with St. John's University in 1971. Campus closed in 2024.
Oneida Institute	Whitesboro	Presbyterian	baccalaureate college	1827	1843	
Packard Business College	New York City	Private for-profit	business college	1858	1954	Building purchased by Stern College for Women
Pentecostal Collegiate Institute	Saratoga Springs	Pentecostal	Bible college	1900	1903	
Rutgers Female College	New York City	Private non-profit	women's seminary	1839	1894	
St. Anthony-on-Hudson Seminary	Rensselaer	Roman Catholic	seminary	1912	1988	
St. Pius X Preparatory Seminary	Hempstead, then Uniondale	Roman Catholic	seminary	1961	1968	
Seminary of the Immaculate Conception	Lloyd Harbor	Roman Catholic	seminary	1926	2012	
State and National Law School	Ballston Spa (1849–1852); Poughkeepsie (1853–1865)	Private non-profit	law school	1849	1865	
Technical Career Institute College of Technology	New York City	Private for-profit	junior college	1909	2017	
Theological School of St. Lawrence University	Canton	Universalist	seminary	1856	1965	
Troy University	Troy	Methodist Episcopal Church	baccalaureate college	1858	1861	
Union Graduate College	Schenectady	Private non-profit	graduate school	2003	2016	Merged into Clarkson University
Utica School of Commerce	Utica	Private for-profit	business college	1896	2016	
Wells College	Aurora	Private non-profit	liberal arts college	1868	2024	
Wood Tobe-Coburn School	New York City	Private for-profit	career college	1937	2017	

== See also ==
- List of colleges and universities in New York
