= Rufus Cowles Crampton =

American educator

- Born: 1828
- Died: June 13, 1888 (aged 59–60)
- Occupation: Educator
- Known for: Past president of Illinois College; Founder of Jacksonville Business College

Rufus Cowles Crampton (1828 - June 13, 1888) was an American educator. He was acting president of Illinois College from 1877 to 1881 and founder of Jacksonville Business College.

== Early years ==
Crampton, son of William and Esther (Cowles) Crampton, was born in Farmington, Connecticut in 1828. He taught in his native town for a year after graduating from Yale College in 1851, and then after a brief engagement as a private tutor took charge of an academy in Montrose, Pennsylvania. In 1854 he accepted an appointment as Professor of Mathematics and Astronomy at Illinois College, at Jacksonville, Illinois, where he continued to do excellent service until overcome by illness.

== Career ==
He served during the American Civil War as Lieutenant Colonel of the 145th Illinois Volunteers, called out for 100 days in 1864. In May 1866, he founded Jacksonville Business College. In 1870 he assumed the financial management of Illinois College; and in 1877 he was made acting President, and held this position for four years. Meantime his health had given way, and though for six years longer he was able with difficulty to perform his duties as Professor, the closing year of his life was one of utter prostration. He is the namesake of Crampton Hall at Illinois College.

== Death ==
He died in Jacksonville on June 13, 1888, at the age of 60.

== Family life ==
He married, about the time of his removal to Jacksonville, Adeline Hart, daughter of Simeon Hart, who survived him with their only child, a son, who was graduated at Illinois College.
