= Maria Regina College =

Women's Catholic junior college in Syracuse

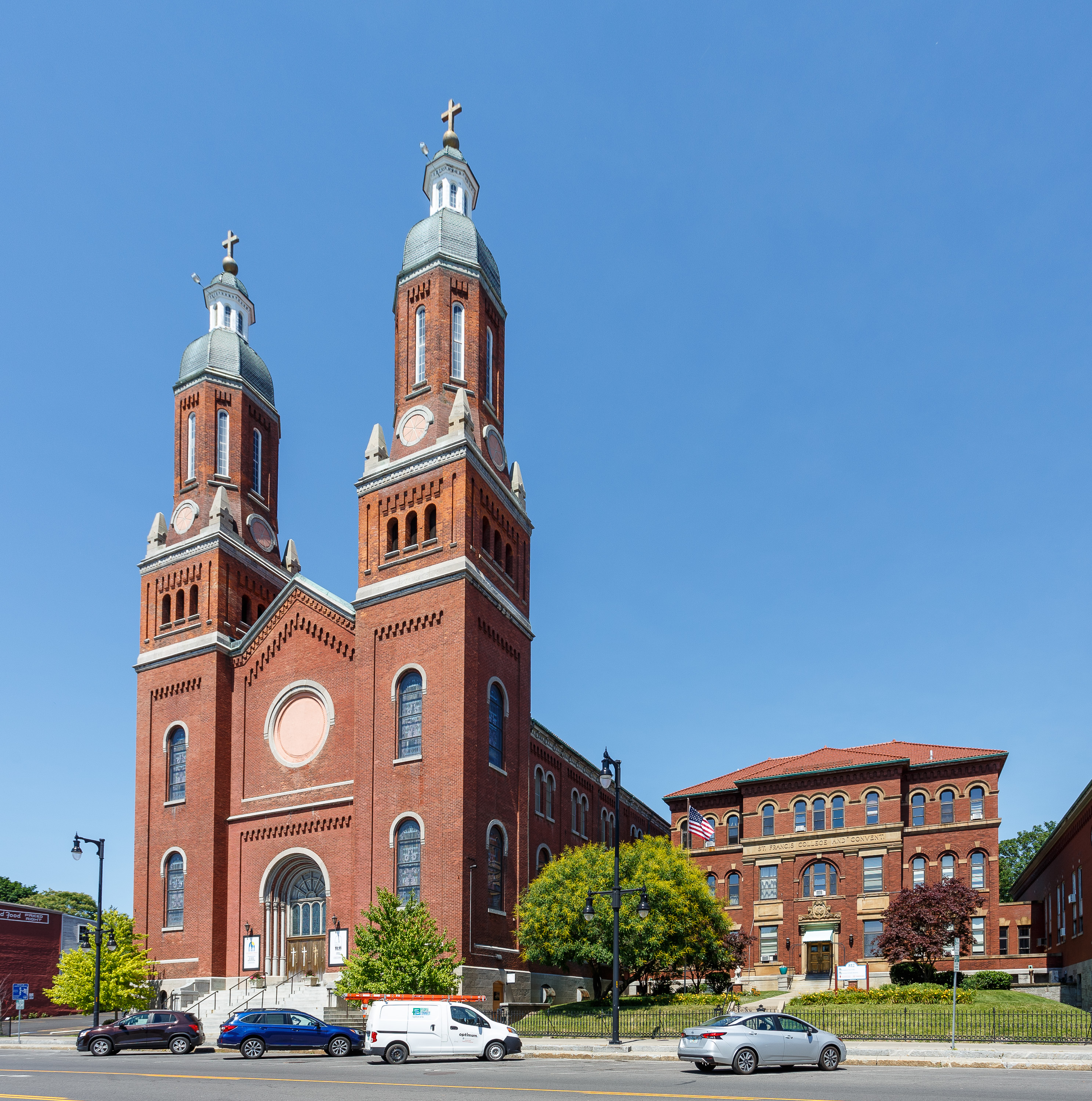
St. Francis College and Convent, former home of Maria Regina College

Maria Regina College was a Catholic junior college for women in Syracuse, New York. Founded in 1934 and associated with the Sisters of the Third Order Franciscan, MC, it closed in 1990.

== See also ==
- List of defunct colleges and universities in New York
