= Utica School of Commerce =

- Type: business college, for-profit college
- Active: 1896–2016
- Founders: Thomas J. Risinger
- Location: Utica, New York, United States
- Campus: three campuses
- Language: English
- Website: www.uscny.edu

Utica School of Commerce was a for-profit business college with three locations in upstate New York. Its main campus was in Utica, New York and it had branch campuses in Canastota, New York and Oneonta, New York. The college was founded in 1896 and closed at the end of 2016.

== History ==
The Utica School of Commerce was founded by Thomas J. Risinger in 1896 in response to an early demand for specialized training in commerce and finance. His son, William S. Risinger, joined him in 1904 and, in 1919, became the head of the school. He retained this position until his retirement on March 1, 1966, at which time a new partnership was formed by Eleanor P., granddaughter of the founder, and Roger L. Williams. On July 1, 1976, they incorporated the school under the laws of New York. Philip M. Williams and John L. Crossley, sole stockholders of the Utica School of Commerce, Inc., were two of the Trustees on the Board of Trustees of the Utica School of Commerce, Inc.

At its founding in 1896, the school was located on the third floor of the Oneida National Bank Building on the corner of Genesee and Bleecker Streets. In 1915, the school expanded its facilities and moved to the Mayro Building in which it had its facilities for 63 years. On September 11, 1978, the Utica School of Commerce moved to its final location at 201 Bleecker Street. In February 1985, the Utica School of Commerce opened its Madison County Branch at the Washington Avenue Community Center in Oneida, and in March 1986, moved to the New York State Jaycees' Building on Route 5 in Canastota. The college opened its new campus adjacent to its former location in September 1992. USC opened its Oneonta Branch in September 1985 in the Verizon Building at 17 Elm Street, Oneonta.

Enrollment peaked in the 2009-2010 school year and declined afterwards. Before its closing, the school had two-year and certificate programs for business administration, administrative specialist, health service management, non-profit agency management, and information technology. USC closed on December 23, 2016, due to low enrollment numbers. Students were given the option to transfer to Bryant and Stratton College in Syracuse or to make arrangements with local community colleges.

== See also ==
- List of defunct colleges and universities in New York
