= Herzing University =

Private university in Wisconsin, United States

Coordinates: 43.0365°N 87.9195°W

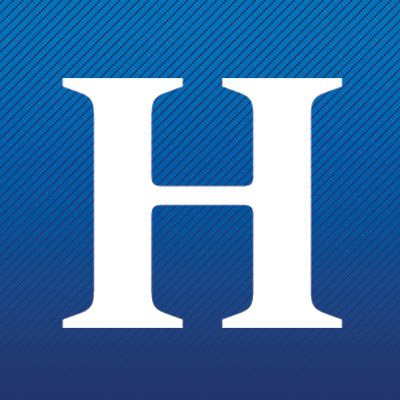
- Former names: Herzing Institute; Herzing College
- Motto: [I'm] Possible at Herzing
- Type: Private university
- Established: 1965
- President: Renée Herzing
- Location: Akron, Atlanta, Birmingham, Brookfield, Clarksville, Kenosha, Madison, Minneapolis, Nashville, New Orleans, Orlando, Tampa; corporate headquarters in Milwaukee
- Campus: Multiple campuses
- Website: www.herzing.edu

Herzing University is a private university with multiple locations throughout the United States, including an online division. The university offers associate, bachelor's, master's, and doctoral degrees in addition to certificates and diplomas. It has 13 campus locations in 9 states: Alabama, Georgia, Florida, Louisiana, Ohio, Minnesota, Texas, Tennessee, and Wisconsin. Its corporate headquarters is located in Milwaukee, Wisconsin.

== History ==
Herzing University was founded by Henry, a United States Navy veteran, and Suzanne Herzing in 1965 as a computer training institute in Milwaukee, Wisconsin.

In 1970, the school was established as Herzing Institute, and the organization started to grow through the acquisition of other schools. The name of the institution had changed again to Herzing College in 1996. In 2009, with the addition of graduate programs, the institution was renamed Herzing University.

In 2015, Herzing University became a nonprofit institution. Seven year later, in 2022, Herzing University's corporate headquarters relocated to downtown Milwaukee, Wisconsin from suburban Menomonee Falls, Wisconsin.

== Academics ==
Students have the option to attend one of the 13 ground campuses in nine U.S. states or earn their degree fully online. Students can also take some online classes while taking other classes at one of the ground campuses.

Herzing's educational programs include fields of study in nursing, healthcare, behavioral health, technology, business, legal studies and public safety. Degree options available at Herzing University include certificates, diplomas, Associate of Science degrees, Bachelor of Science degrees, Master of Science degrees, a Master of Business Administration (MBA), a Master of Social Work (MSW), and doctoral degrees, including the Doctor of Nursing Practice (DNP), the Doctor of Nursing Education (DNE), and a doctoral degree in behavioral health. Degree options vary based upon campus location.

The university expanded its online graduate nursing program offerings in June 2025, adding new specialty pathways.

In July 2025, Herzing University launched an online Bachelor of Social Work program, expanding its behavioral health offerings at the undergraduate level. Herzing also began enrolling students in Texas in July 2025 in an online Bachelor of Science in Nursing program, ahead of the opening of its Irving campus.

In the 2025 U.S. News & World Report Best Online Programs rankings, Herzing University was ranked No. 105 among Best Online Bachelor’s Programs, No. 169 among Best Online MBA Programs, and No. 85 among Best Online Graduate Nursing Programs.

The university is accredited by the Higher Learning Commission. Nursing programs at several campuses hold specialized accreditation through the Commission on Collegiate Nursing Education and the Accreditation Commission for Education in Nursing (ACEN). Business programs hold specialized accreditation through the International Accreditation Council for Business Education (IACBE).

== Campuses ==
The university has 13 locations:

- Akron, Ohio (established in 1970, formerly Akron Institute of Herzing University)
- Atlanta, Georgia (founded in 1949 as Massey Business College, became part of Herzing in 1979)
- Birmingham, Alabama (founded as Electronic Computer Programming Institute in 1965, Herzing acquired it in 1968)
- Brookfield, Wisconsin
- Clarksville, Tennessee
- Kenosha, Wisconsin
- Madison, Wisconsin (founded in 1948 as Wisconsin School of Electronics, the school merged with Herzing Institute in 1970)
- Metairie, Louisiana
- Nashville, Tennessee
- Clarksville, Tennessee, (opened November 2025 as a satellite of the Nashville campus, located near Fort Campbell).
- Irving (Dallas), Texas
- St. Louis Park, Minnesota (created by the merger of two colleges, Minneapolis Drafting School, established in 1961 and became part of Herzing University in 2000, and Lakeland Medical-Dental Academy, established in 1958, became part of Herzing in 2002)
- Tampa, Florida
- Winter Park, Florida
