= Massey Business College =

American business college chain

Massey Business College was a chain of business colleges in the southern United States in the late 19th and 20th century. Richard W. Massey established the first Massey Business College in Birmingham, Alabama in 1887. He served as president of the "Massey System" of colleges for fifty years, and died in Birmingham in 1949.

A 1900 school directory lists Massey's located in Houston, Birmingham, Montgomery (Alabama), and Columbus, Georgia. By 1914, locations had been added in Richmond, Virginia, Louisville, Kentucky, and Jacksonville, Florida. A 1973 school directory also listed locations in Lufkin, Texas and Nacogdoches, Texas.

Massey Business College maintained that name at some locations between 1953 and 1988. In 1958, the name was changed at various locations to Massey College until 1964. In 1964, the name was changed yet again at various locations to Massey Junior College.

== Locations ==
- The original Birmingham college closed in 1960.
- The Richmond location was opened in 1897. In 1932, it merged with the Smithdeal Business College (founded in 1867) to form Smithdeal-Massey Business College, which closed in 1982 after its accreditation was withdrawn.
- There were 2 Atlanta Locations: The original Atlanta location was opened in 1949 and was located at 56 Marietta Street, NW in Atlanta. It later became the Art Institute of Atlanta in 1975. A second Atlanta location, at 5299 Roswell Road in Atlanta, became part of the Herzing Institute system of colleges on 12/28/1988 but remained as Massey Business College until 1996 when the name was changed to Herzing College and then Herzing University in 2009. The current location is 50 Hurt Plaza SE, Suite 400, Atlanta, Georgia 30303.
- The Jacksonville location lasted into the 1970s.
