= Hagerstown Business College =

Former for-profit college in Hagerstown, Maryland, US

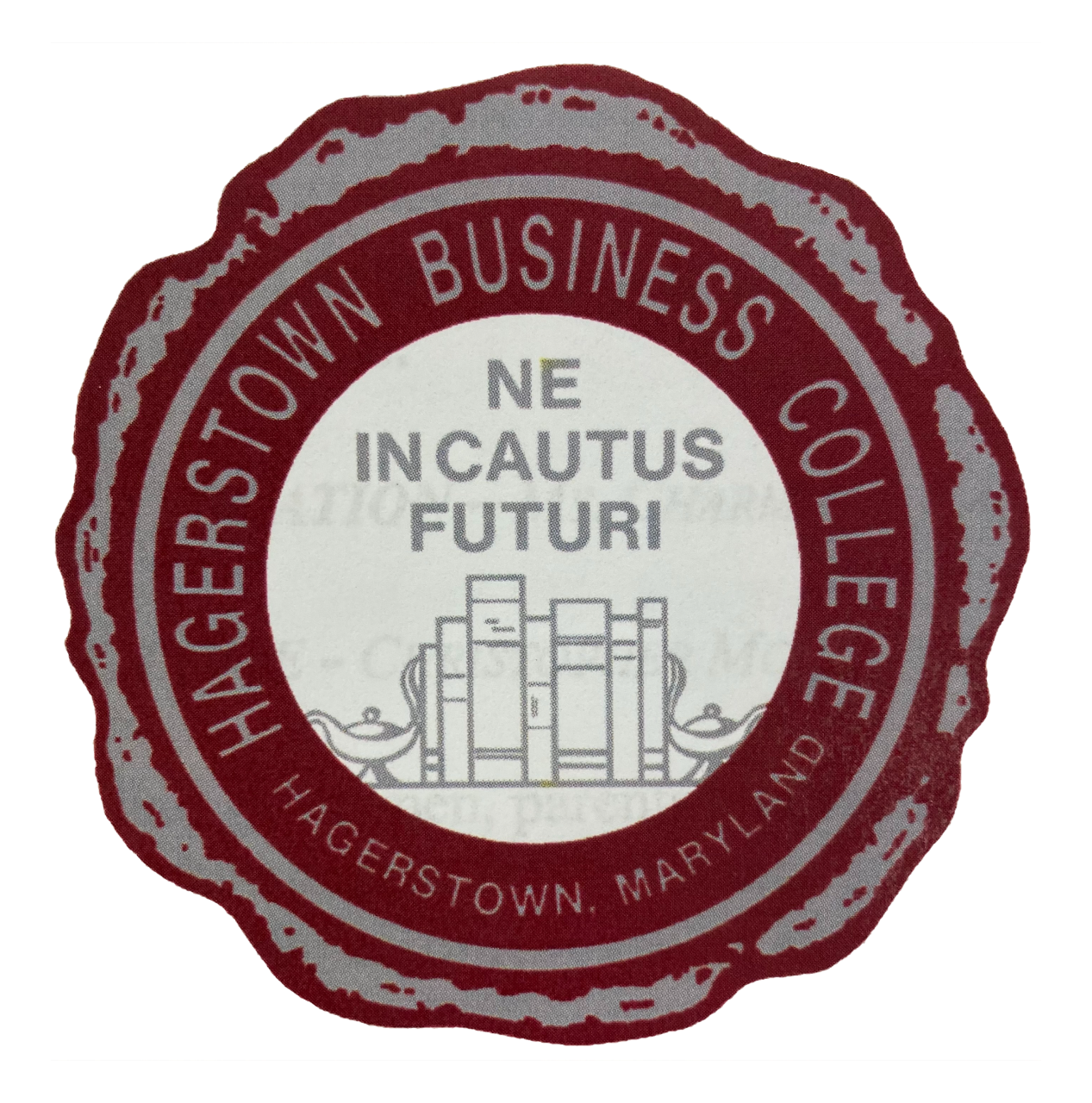
- Motto: Ne Incautus Futuri
- Type: For-profit
- Established: 1938
- Location: Hagerstown, Maryland, United States
- Campus: 7.5 acre, residential
- Colors: Burgundy & Gray
- Mascot: Folcrum Fox

Hagerstown Business College (or HBC) was a private for-profit college that operated in Hagerstown, Maryland from 1938 to 2007 when it became part of Kaplan College. Established in 1938, HBC offered associate degrees and certificates in business, secretarial studies and specialized medical and legal assisting, later adding programs in health information technology, computer technology and graphic design. Hagerstown Business College at one time included both the Maryland Medical Secretarial School and the National Legal Secretarial School.

== History ==
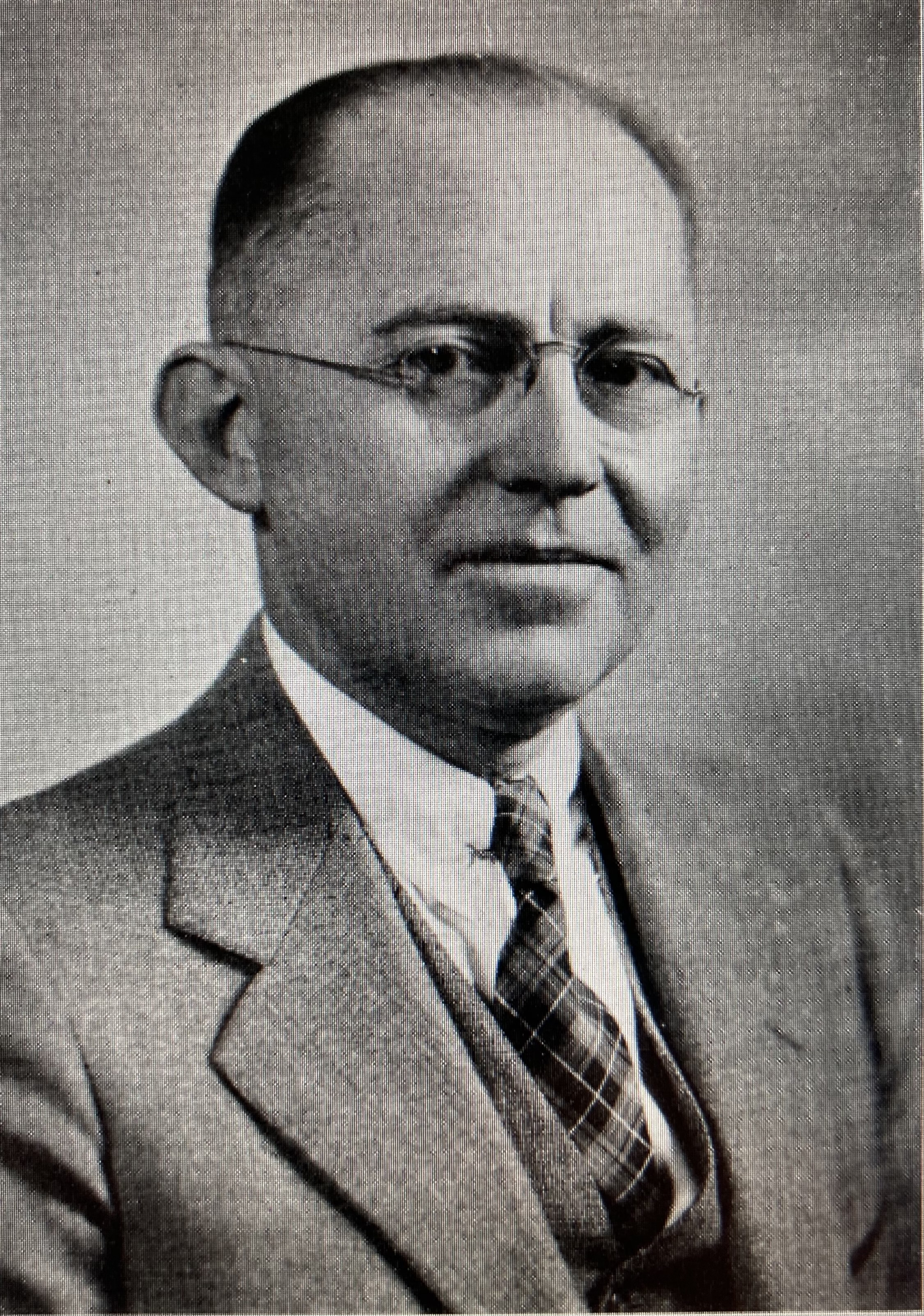
Edward J. Hajek, Founder of Hagerstown Business College

Hagerstown Business College was founded in 1938 by Edward J. Hajek. The school's original location was in the Professional Arts Building on Public Square in Hagerstown, Maryland, where it started with 12 students in the building's basement. The school moved to a larger campus on North Potomac Street in 1949. HBC initially offered programs in bookkeeping, general business and secretarial studies. In 1949, the school developed a specialized medical secretarial program ("Maryland Medical Secretarial School") becoming one of the first schools in the country to offer such a program. A specialized legal secretarial program was later added around 1961. Hagerstown Business College was approved to offer associate degrees by the Maryland State Board for Higher Education in 1973.

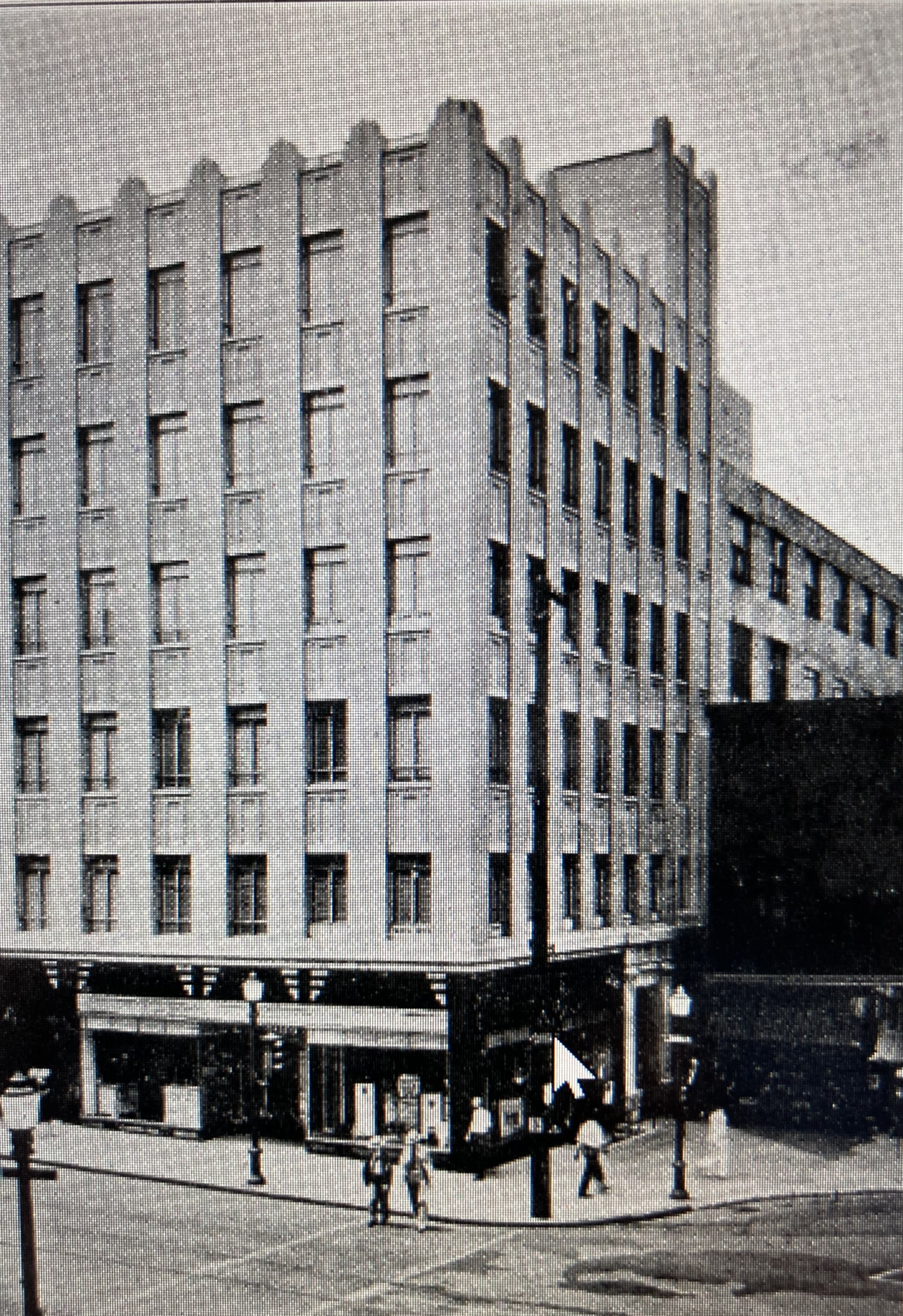
Professional Arts Building, Public Square, Hagerstown, Maryland

In 1979, HBC was purchased by National Resources, Inc. In 1983, the college became accredited by The Association of Independent Colleges and Schools. In 1984, the college was purchased by the HBC Acquisition Corporation. The school moved to a newly constructed 7.5 acre campus in the north end of Hagerstown in 1985. HBC was purchased by O/E Learning of Troy, Michigan in 1988. A fire caused by arson destroyed the campus administration building in 1991.

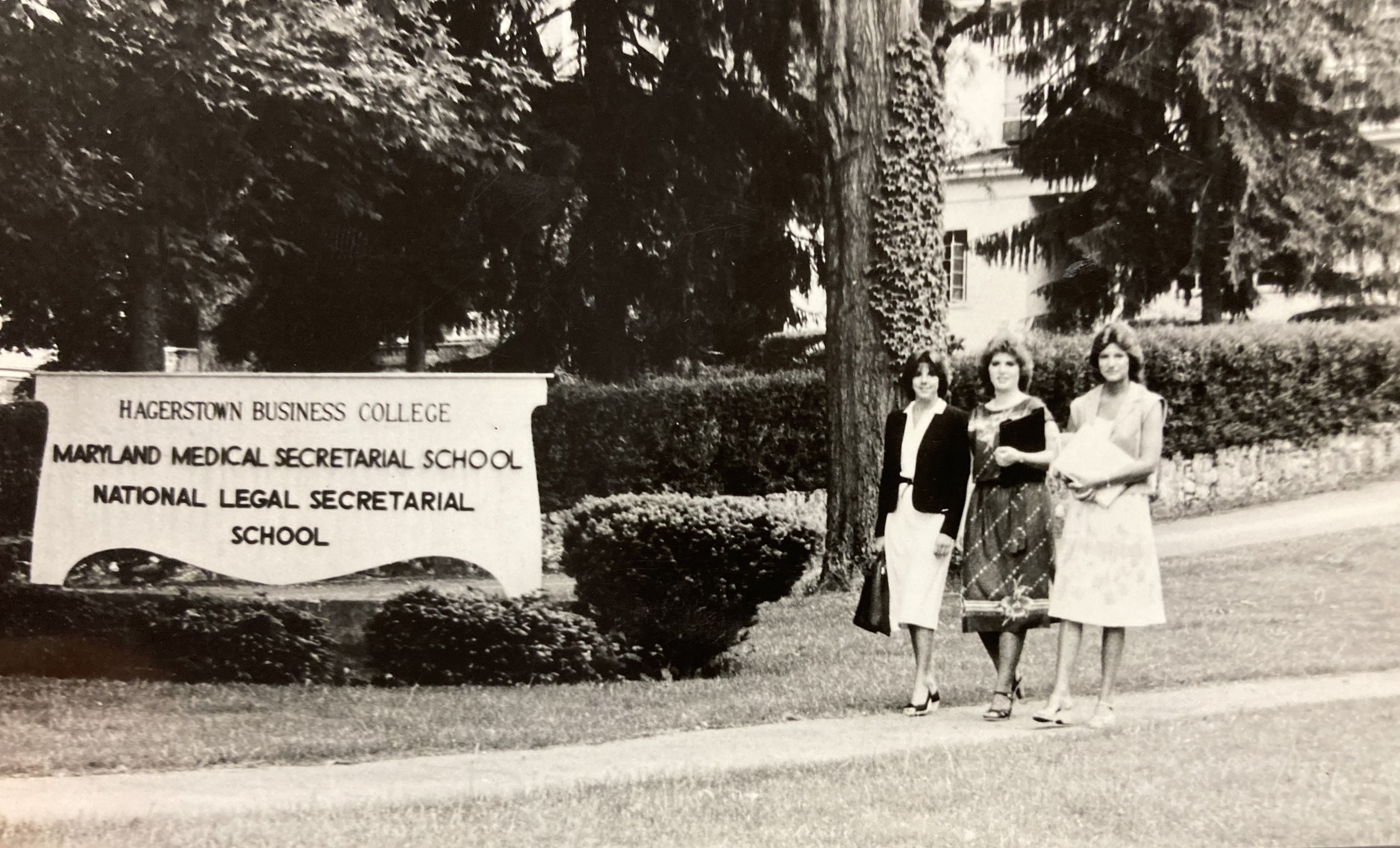
Students at Potomac Avenue Campus

In 1996, Hagerstown Business College was purchased by Educational Medical, Inc. (EMI) of Alpharetta, Georgia. EMI changed its name to Quest Education Corporation in 1998. Quest was purchased by Kaplan, Inc., a subsidiary of The Washington Post Company in 2000.

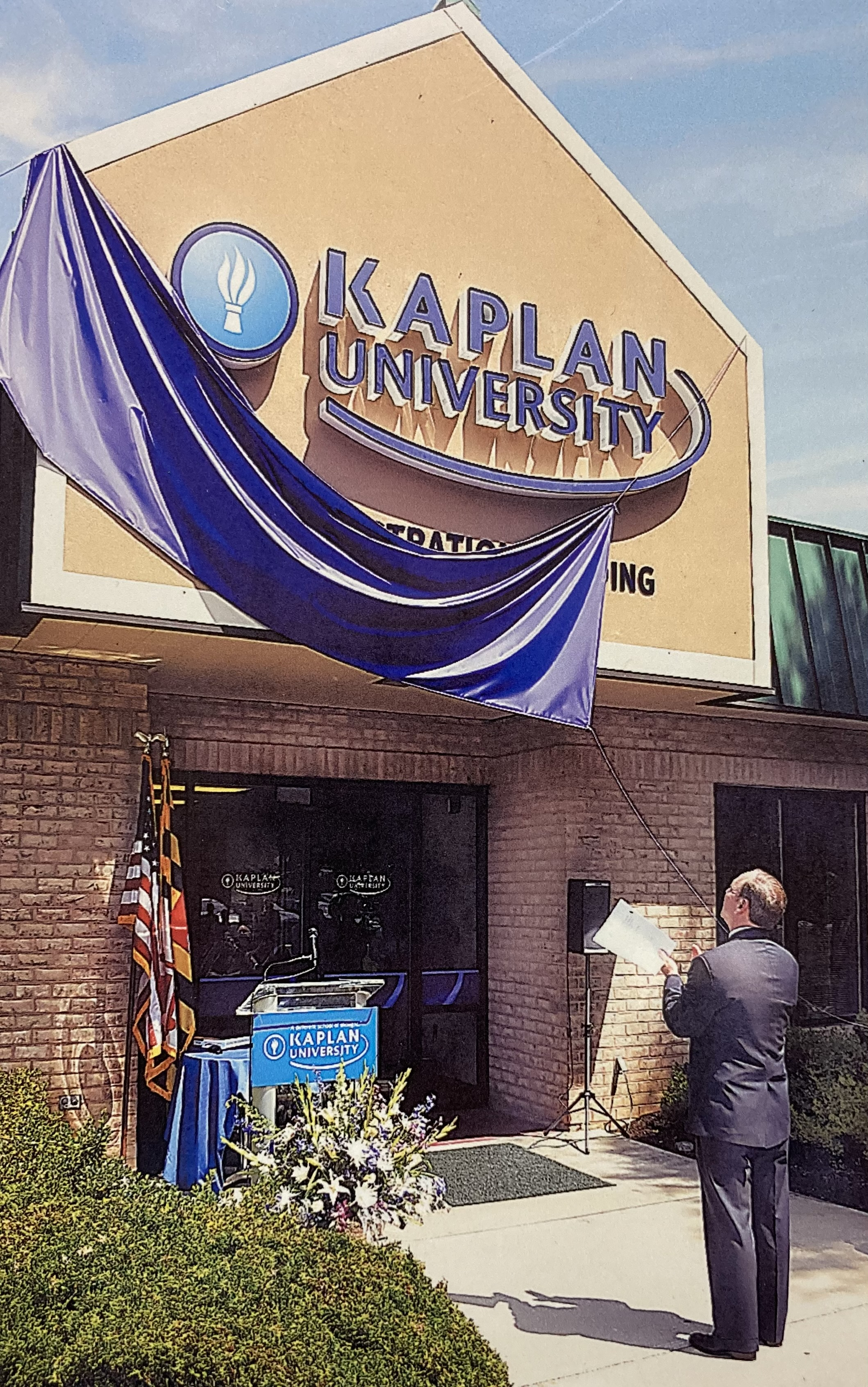
President W. Christopher Motz at Kaplan University Renaming, 2009

Hagerstown Business College was approved to grant bachelor's degrees in 2007. In 2007, Hagerstown Business College's name was changed to Kaplan College. In 2009, the school became a regionally accredited campus of Kaplan University and added online programs. In 2017, it was announced that Purdue University would purchase Kaplan University to serve working adults. In April 2018, the school became a campus of Purdue University Global. In August 2019, operations at the Hagerstown location ceased and went fully online.

== Presidents ==
- Edward J. Hajek (1938–1963)
- Richard J. Hajek (1963–1980)
- J.D. Maynard (1980–1982)
- Richard J. Hajek (1982–1983)
- Ronald W. McFadden (1983–1984)
- Dudley E. Bryant (1984–1987)
- Glenda F. Smith (1987–1989)
- Cheryl M. Hyslop (1989–1993)
- James E. Gifford (1993–1998)
- W. Christopher Motz (1998–2007)
