= Lockyear College =

- U.S. National Register of Historic Places
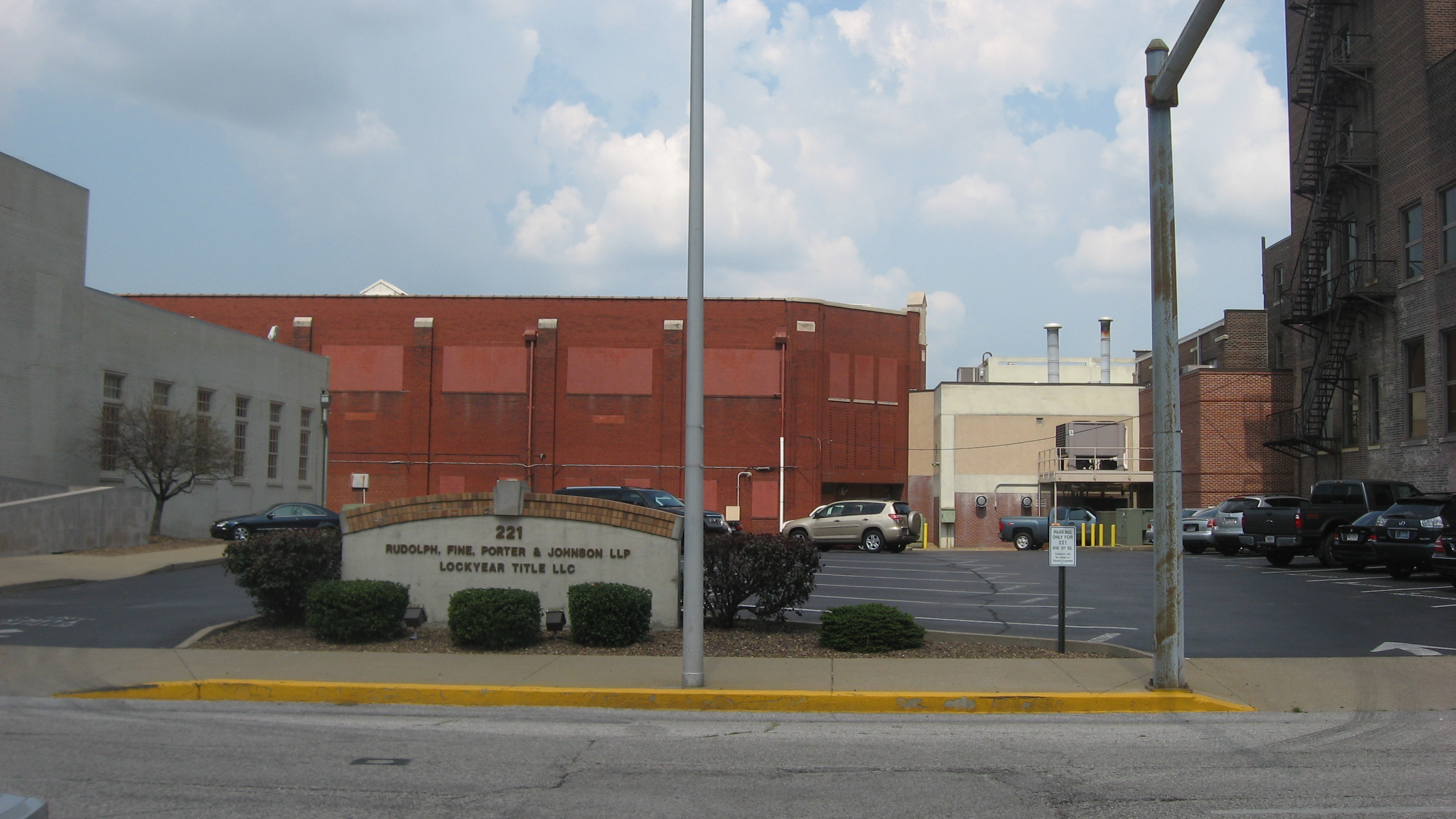
- Lockyear College site, July 2011

- Location within Indiana Location within the United States
- Location: 209 NW 5th St., Evansville, Indiana
- Coordinates: 37°58′27″N 87°34′17″W
- Area: 0.2 acres (0.081 ha)
- Built: 1911
- Architect: Gilbert, F. Mason
- Architectural style: Classical Revival
- MPS: Downtown Evansville MRA
- NRHP reference No.: 84001729
- Added to NRHP: April 6, 1984

Lockyear College, also known as Lockyear's Business College, was a historic Business college located in downtown Evansville, Indiana. Originally named Columbian Business College when it opened in 1893 at Fourth and Main streets, the institution became known as Lockyear Business College after Melvin H. Lockyear became in 1897; continuing growth led to the new building on Fifth Street, which was built in 1911, and was a Classical Revival style building.

In 1975, Lockyear opened a branch in Indianapolis, but financial problems forced Lockyear Business College to close in April 1991. The main building was later razed in 1993.

It was listed on the National Register of Historic Places in 1984.
