= Jamestown Business College =

For-profit college in Jamestown, New York

Coordinates: 42°05′44″N 79°14′59″W

- Active: 1886–2025
- Students: 287 (FA 2022)
- Location: Jamestown, New York, United States

Jamestown Business College (JBC) was a private for-profit college in Jamestown, New York, that operated from 1886 until February 2025.

== History ==
It was founded in 1886 by E.J. Coburn from Sugar Grove, Pennsylvania.

In February 2024, college officials announced that the college would no longer enroll new students and was beginning to close permanently. They cited "the college's size and the expanding government regulations" as reasons for the closure. The college officially closed in February 2025.

== Academics ==
The college offered an Associate in Applied Science (AAS) degree and a Bachelor in Business Administration (BBA) degree. It also offered a Master in Business Administration (MBA) degree in partnership with Gannon University in Erie, Pennsylvania.

It was accredited by the Middle States Commission on Higher Education from 2001 until its closure on March 31, 2025.

== See also ==
- List of defunct colleges and universities in New York
