= Ladycliff College =

Catholic college in Highland Falls, New York (1933–1980)

Coordinates: 41°22′20″N 73°57′43″W

Ladycliff College was a small Catholic college in Highland Falls, New York. Founded in 1933 as a women's college by the Franciscan Sisters of Peekskill, it remained as such until admitting 7 men in 1974.

The 1978 and 1979 graduating classes were the largest in school history with 131 graduates each. The school closed after the 1979–80 school year.

The school was located adjacent to the United States Military Academy at West Point. The academy acquired the property, and it is the location of the school's museum.

The complete history of Ladycliff College is recounted in Ladycliff Remembered: A Journey through Time, a book by Linda Buzzeo Best.

== See also ==
- List of defunct colleges and universities in New York
