= Midstate College =

For-profit college in Peoria, Illinois, US

- Former names: Brown's Business College of Commerce (1888–1960); Midstate College of Commerce (1960–1970)
- Type: for-profit university
- Active: 1888–2019
- Chairman: R. Dale Bunch
- President: Meredith N. Bunch (2010–2019)
- Students: 685 (in 2010)
- Location: Peoria, Illinois, United States; 40°45′42″N 89°35′57″W
- Campus: Urban
- Website: www.midstate.edu

Midstate College was a private for-profit college from 1888 to 2019 in Peoria, Illinois, United States. The Illinois Board of Higher Education serves as the custodian of records for the college following the its closure.

== History ==
Midstate College's origins date back to 1857, when a commercial school was started in Peoria. In 1865, a similar school opened, and the two schools combined in 1868. In 1888, the merged school was bought by George W. Brown, principal of Jacksonville Business College, and named Brown's Business College of Commerce.

In 1902, a new building was completed at 240 South (now Southwest) Jefferson Street, on the corner of Jefferson and Harrison Streets downtown, and Brown's Business College moved into the second and third floors.

Over time, Mr. Brown increased his properties to 20 institutions, including Cairo, Decatur, Jacksonville and Rockford in Illinois; Davenport and Muscatine, Iowa; and St. Louis, Missouri.

Mr. Brown continued ownership of the Peoria school until 1913, then sold it to a Mr. Reed. Reed sold the school in 1960 to A.R. Beard, Don Beard, and Arline H. Bunch, who renamed the school Midstate College of Commerce. In 1965, the Bunch family purchased the stock, and renamed the school to simply Midstate College in 1970. R. Dale Bunch became president around 1965.

In October 1997, Midstate moved from its 95-year-old downtown location to 411 West Northmoor Road, near the corner of Northmoor Road and Knoxville Avenue (Illinois Route 40). The downtown building was bought by a developer, was renovated, and became known as the Prairie Building in 1998.

In November 1999, Midstate was approved as a four-year institution and began offering a Bachelor of Business Administration degree; other bachelor's degrees were added later. The Arline H. Bunch Business Center opened in January 2002.

Bunch's daughter, Meredith N. Bunch, became college president in November 2010; R. Dale Bunch remained chairman of the board.

In 2018, Midstate College announced an upcoming Master of Business Administration program.

In July 2019, Meredith Bunch announced that Midstate would close at the end of the 2019 summer semester and put the campus up for sale, after the college went through declining enrollment and a potential partnership with another educational institution fell through, leaving the college with a lack of funding.

The Illinois Board of Higher Education serves as the custodian of records for the college following the its closure.
