= Brown's Business College =

American business college chain

Brown's Business College was a chain of business colleges located in the Midwestern United States, started in Illinois in the 1870s by George W. Brown (1845-1918) of Jacksonville, Illinois. He grew the chain to at least 29 locations during the 1910s (though perhaps not all existed simultaneously). Though most of the colleges had closed or changed names by the 1960s, at least one location continued under the same name into the early 1990s.

== History ==
Brown joined the faculty of the Jacksonville Business College in 1867, a year after it was founded by Rufus C. Crampton of Illinois College. Around 1876, Brown took over the school and renamed it. By 1889, he had acquired schools in Peoria and Decatur, and by 1894 also had locations in Ottawa, Galesburg, Bloomington, and Centralia, for a total of seven locations. A description of the schools from 1898 states that they provided instruction in "Accounting, Business and Office Practice, Writing, Expert Accounting, What is Required of Stenographers, and the Elements of Success in Business."

By 1907, there were 19 Brown's in existence. At least 29 schools were open at the chain's zenith.

Brown died in 1918, but the chain continued. Some locations continued under that name into the 1960s and 1970s, and the location in Springfield was open until 1994. Some of the colleges, through successors, still exist today, including Midstate College in Peoria and Rockford Career College in Rockford. The Sanford–Brown group of colleges or "institutes" also traces their history through a St. Louis location of Brown's.

== Locations ==
Locations of Brown's included the following non-exhaustive list:

- Alton, Illinois
- Bloomington, Illinois: Bloomington Business College was in existence by 1870, was acquired by Brown by 1894, and operated into the early 1940s.
- Cairo, Illinois
- Centralia, Illinois
- Champaign, Illinois
- Decatur, Illinois (c. 1889 – 1972): First known as Decatur Business College, renamed as Brown's after G.W. Brown purchased it, it closed in 1972.
- Danville, Illinois: Was purchased by R.M. Utterback of Utterback Business College chain c. 1926, and combined with the Utterback location in that city, to become "Utterback-Brown Business College."
- DeKalb, Illinois
- East St. Louis, Illinois
- Freeport, Illinois
- Galesburg, Illinois (1890s - 1967): Founded as the Western Business Institute, became Brown's in the 1890s, until 1967. When community college Carl Sandburg College opened for classes in September 1967, it used the Brown's building for some of its classes. The building, at 119 S. Cherry Street, is now an apartment building under the name "Brown's Business College Building"
- Jacksonville, Illinois (1866, Brown's since c. 1876 – ?): Founded as Jacksonville Business College in 1866 by Rufus C. Crampton, it was acquired by Brown in 1876.
- Kankakee, Illinois
- Marion, Illinois: Was not reopened after a fire destroyed its building in December 1963.
- Moline, Illinois (1901 - ?): Opened in 1897 by J.E. Gustus as the "Gustus School of Business", it was acquired by Brown and renamed in 1901. Guster stayed on as director of the schools in Moline, Rock Island, and Davenport.
- Peoria, Illinois (1888-1960): Acquired by Brown in 1888, known as Brown's until 1960, and is now Midstate College
- Rock Island, Illinois: Opened 1901.
- Ottawa, Illinois (1894 - ?): Founded as Toland Business College in 1888, later was named Ottawa Business University, and was acquired by Brown and renamed in 1894.
- Rockford, Illinois (1902-1942): Rockford Business College was founded in 1862, was called Becker's Business College by 1877, and was acquired by Brown in 1892 although not renamed as Brown's Business College until 1902. In 1942, it became Rockford School of Business. As of 2008, ultimate successor is Rockford Career College.
- Springfield, Illinois (1913-1994): Founded under another name in the 1860s, was open through 1994.
- Sterling, Illinois
- Streator, Illinois
- Terre Haute, Indiana: Merged with Wabash Business College in the 1930s to become the Wabash-Brown College of Commerce.
- Davenport, Iowa: Opened 1901.
- Muscatine, Iowa
- Sioux City, Iowa
- St. Louis, Missouri. A location opened in a new building at the corner of Vandeventer Ave. and Delmar Boulevard in 1905. Another location was at 8th and Pine St.
- Lincoln, Nebraska: Founded in 1904, became the Nebraska School of Business sometime prior to 1915.

== Other Brown's ==
Brown is a common surname, and there were other institutions called "Brown's Business College" that were not affiliated with George W. Brown's chain.

- Bridgeport, Connecticut: Does not appear to have any connection, was owned by an I.S. Brown. Renamed Gutchess College in 1910, acquired by Ernest M. Butler in 1917, and became a Butler Business School, which closed in December 2012.
