= Biscayne Southern College =

Private college in North Carolina (1948–2004)

Biscayne Southern College was located in North Carolina, United States, with its main campus in Concord. It operated from 1948 to 2004.

== History ==
Biscayne Southern College was founded in 1948 in Concord, North Carolina. It opened a branch in Charlotte, North Carolina. John R. Hamrick became dean of the Charlotte campus in 1973. Evans Business College, a two-year business college established in Gastonia, North Carolina in 1940, became the Biscayne Southern College in Gastonia in August 1974. There was a chapter of Alpha Iota business sorority at the Evans Business College.

In 1975, North Carolina granted the college, now with three locations (Gastonia, Concord, and Charlotte), a license to have degree-granting programs. As of 1983, the college was operating as a liberal arts college with a total enrollment of 526, and offered four-year degrees. It ceased operation in 2004.
