= Hampton Roads Rhinos =

Proposed National Hockey League expansion team

- League: National Hockey League
- Team history: Proposed expansion franchise in 1997
- Based in: Norfolk, Virginia
- Arena: Unbuilt Downtown Norfolk arena
- Colors: Teal, purple, blue
- Owner: George Shinn

The Hampton Roads Rhinos were a potential National Hockey League expansion team that was to begin play in the late-1990s in Norfolk, Virginia. The franchise would have been under the ownership of George Shinn and play in a proposed $142 million arena to be constructed in Downtown Norfolk. After making a push to sell season tickets and reaching an agreement in principle to construct the arena, the NHL rejected the Norfolk bid for an expansion franchise in February 1997. By the following May, the prospect of an NHL franchise calling Hampton Roads home ended with the relocation of the Hartford Whalers to Raleigh, North Carolina, less than 190 miles (310 km) southwest of Norfolk.

== History ==
The prospect of attracting an NHL franchise to Norfolk was initially explored in the early 1990s. An NHL franchise became the best option in attracting a professional sports team to the region based on its lower expansion fee (approximately $50 million in 1994) and the success of the Hampton Roads Admirals of the East Coast Hockey League (ECHL) during the late 1980s and early 1990s. In November 1994, the Hampton Roads Sports Authority released a report indicating the region could support an NHL franchise and that in order to attract one a 20,000-seat arena would have to be constructed as both the Norfolk Scope and Hampton Coliseum were too small to host an NHL team.

By 1996 George Shinn, owner of the then Charlotte Hornets of the National Basketball Association (NBA), indicated that he was looking to the Hampton Roads as a potential location for an NHL expansion team. Shinn met several times with local officials and indicated that he was looking at both Norfolk and Raleigh, North Carolina as potential cities to develop an expansion bid. Shinn indicated that if awarded a franchise it would be called the Rhinos with the team colors being teal, purple and blue. On November 1, 1996, Shinn officially submitted an application to the NHL for one of the four expansion franchise slots to play in Norfolk. At the time of application the Hampton Roads was the largest metropolitan area in the United States without a major professional sports franchise and was in competition with Atlanta, Houston, Nashville, Columbus, Hamilton, St. Paul, Oklahoma City and Raleigh for a franchise. At this time Shinn also indicated if an expansion franchise was not awarded to the city, he would look to relocate an existing franchise to Norfolk if an arena was constructed and season ticket sales were positive. Following the announcement of the bid, Shinn initiated a season ticket drive with the stated goal of selling 10,000 with deposits of $100 per ticket. Although season ticket sales only reached 5,160 sold of the stated goal of 10,000 by January 1997, Rhinos officials remained optimistic about their chances of securing an expansion franchise.

With an agreement in principle for the construction of an arena, Shinn and the Rhinos ownership met with Gary Bettman and other NHL officials in New York to make their official pitch for one of the expansion franchises. Leaving the meetings, once thought to be a long shot, some present for the Rhinos' presentation stated Hampton Roads had moved up as the fourth option for expansion with Columbus. Furthermore, Hartford Whalers owner Peter Karmanos, Jr. was so impressed with the presentation that he stated he would now consider moving the franchise to Norfolk if an expansion franchise was not awarded for the 1997-98 season. However, on February 19, 1997, the NHL turned down Shinn's bid to bring a franchise to Norfolk. The league stated the region's East Coast location, lack of political unity, relatively small size and location, which was near the home territory of the Washington Capitals as being the factors leading to the league rejecting the Norfolk bid. Although Shinn indicated he would move an existing franchise if not granted an expansion franchise, the Whalers relocated to Raleigh and became the Carolina Hurricanes in May 1997. The ability to attract an NHL team to Norfolk ended with this relocation as the Hurricanes would be in too close proximity to a Norfolk franchise.

== Proposed arena ==
In November 1996, Shinn announced that his preferred site for an arena would be in Downtown Norfolk between the Norfolk Scope and the MacArthur Center. The location was selected over a site adjacent to Harbor Park and one adjacent to Regent University in Virginia Beach due to its central location within the greater Hampton Roads region. The final location for the proposed arena was to be in the block bound by St. Paul's Boulevard, Monticello and Brambleton Avenues, and would require the demolition of a then Howard Johnson hotel. In January 1997, Shinn and area leaders came to an agreement as to how to finance construction of the arena.

The proposed facility would have had seating for approximately 20,000 spectators and a parking garage for 1,000 vehicles at a cost of an estimated $143 million and be under the ownership of the Hampton Roads Sports Facility Authority. Its construction costs would come from the sale of 30-year municipal bonds issued by the Hampton Roads Sports Facility Authority with an estimated annual debt payment of $8.8 million. The payments would come from a combination of taxes generated by the arena (estimated at $4.8 million), contributions from area localities ($2.3 million), rent from the Rhinos ($1 million) and arena naming rights ($700,000). The area localities contributing to the debt payment on the arena included the cities of Virginia Beach, Norfolk, Chesapeake, Portsmouth, Suffolk, Newport News, Hampton, Poquoson, Williamsburg and Franklin, and counties of Isle of Wight, York, Gloucester, Southampton and James City.

In mid-January, the Hampton Roads Sports Facility Authority announced construction of the arena would generate an annual profit of $777,000. However, by the end of the month, all of the respective mayors and county commissioners determined that votes would be delayed relevant to financing arena construction until the NHL awarded Hampton Roads an expansion franchise. By mid-February the Virginia General Assembly passed legislation allowing for some of the sales tax generated by the proposed arena to be used in debt repayment. With the league rejecting the Norfolk expansion bid, the proposed arena was not constructed.

== Bibliography ==
Notes

References

- Reilly, Robert F.; Schweihs, Robert P. (1999). Handbook of advanced business valuation (1999 ed.). McGraw-Hill Professional. ISBN 978-0-07-134769-3. - Total pages: 512
