= List of Laureate Education institutions =

In 2021, Laureate Education owns and operates schools in Mexico and Peru.

== Mexico ==
- Universidad del Valle de México (UVM)
- Universidad Tecnológica de México (UNITEC)

== Peru ==
- CIBERTEC
- Universidad Peruana de Ciencias Aplicadas (UPC)
- Universidad Privada del Norte (UPN)

== Sold or closed schools or returned operations to the state ==
- Centro Universitário do Norte – UniNorte (Brazil) (sold 2019)
- Instituto Profesional (AIEP) (Chile)
- Instituto Profesional Escuela Moderna de Música (EMM) (Chile)
- Universidad Andrés Bello (UNAB) (Chile)
- Universidad de Las Américas Chile (UDLA) (Chile)
- Universidad Viña del Mar (UVM) (Chile)
- Les Roches Jin Jiang International Hotel Management College (China) (sold 2016)
- Xi'an Jiaotong-Liverpool University XJTLU (China) (Laureate's online program partnership with the university was discontinued in 2018. The degrees were awarded by University of Liverpool.)
- European University Cyprus (EUC)
- Universidad de Las Americas—UDLA (Ecuador)
- École centrale d'électronique (France)
- ESCE International Business School (France)
- Institut Français de Gestion (France)
- BiTS—Business and Information Technology School (Germany)
- Pearl Academy (India) (in sale negotiations as of May 2019)
- University of Petroleum and Energy Studies—UPES (India) (in sale negotiations as of May 2019)
- Domus Academy (Italy)
- Nuova Accademia di Belle Arti (Italy)
- INTI (Malaysia)
- Universidad del Desarrollo Profesional—UNIDEP (Mexico)
- Université Internationale de Casablanca (Morocco)
- University of Liverpool (Laureate's online program partnership with the university was discontinued in 2018. All degrees were awarded by University of Liverpool.)
- University of Roehampton (Laureate's online program partnership with the university was discontinued in 2018. All degrees were awarded by University of Roehampton.)
- Instituto Tecnologico del Norte (Peru)
- Universidade Europeia de Lisboa (Portugal) (sold 2018)
- Instituto Português de Administração de Marketing (Portugal) (sold 2018)
- Monash University (South Africa) (sold 2019)
- Universidad Europea de Madrid (Spain) (sold 2018)
- Glion Institute of Higher Education (Switzerland and UK)
- Universidad Europea de Valencia (Spain)
- Universidad Europea de Canarias (Spain)
- Istanbul Bilgi University (Turkey) (sold 2019)
- National Hispanic University (US) (closed 2015)
- Santa Fe University of Art and Design (US) (closed 2018)
- Kendall College (US) (sold 2018)
- University of St. Augustine for Health Sciences (US) (sold 2019)
- Stamford International University (Thailand) (sold 2019)
- Royal Academy of Culinary Arts (Jordan) (sold 2016)
- Al Kharj Female College of Excellence (Saudi Arabia)
- Higher Institute for Paper and Industrial Technologies—HIPIT (Saudi Arabia)
- Higher Institute for Power and Water Technologies—HIWPT (Saudi Arabia)
- Jeddah College of Excellence (Saudi Arabia)
- Mecca Female College of Excellence (Saudi Arabia)
- Riyadh Polytechnic Institute—RPI (Saudi Arabia)
- Riyadh Tourism & Hospitality College of Excellence (Saudi Arabia)
- Al Nammas Female College of Excellence (Saudi Arabia)
- Universidad Interamericana de Panamá (UIP) (Pananma) (sold 2019)

=== Latin America ===
==== Brazil ====
- Business School São Paulo (BSP)
- CEDEPE Business School (CEDEPE)
- Centro Universitário Ritter dos Reis (UniRitter)
- Faculdade dos Guararapes (UNIFG)
- Faculdade Potiguar da Paraíba (FPB)
- Faculdade Unida da Paraíba (UniPB)
- Centro Universitário das Faculdades Metropolitanas Unidas (FMU)
- Instituto Brasileiro de Medicina de Reabilitação (Centro Universitário IBMR)
- Universidade Anhembi Morumbi (UAM)
- Universidade Potiguar (UnP)
- Universidade Salvador (UNIFACS)

==== Costa Rica ====
- Universidad Americana (Costa Rica) (UAM)
- Universidad Latina

==== Honduras ====
- Centro Universitario Tecnológico (CEUTEC)
- Universidad Tecnológica Centroamericana (UNITEC)

=== Asia Pacific ===
==== Australia ====
- Think Education, which includes, APM College of Business and Communication, Australasian College of Natural Therapies, Australian National College of Beauty, Billy Blue College of Design, CATC Design School, Jansen Newman Institute, Southern School of Natural Therapies, and William Blue College of Hospitality Management
- Torrens University Australia which includes Blue Mountains International Hotel Management School (BMIHMS)

==== New Zealand ====
- Media Design School, Auckland

=== North America ===
==== United States ====
- Walden University (acquired by Adtalem)

== Institution gallery ==
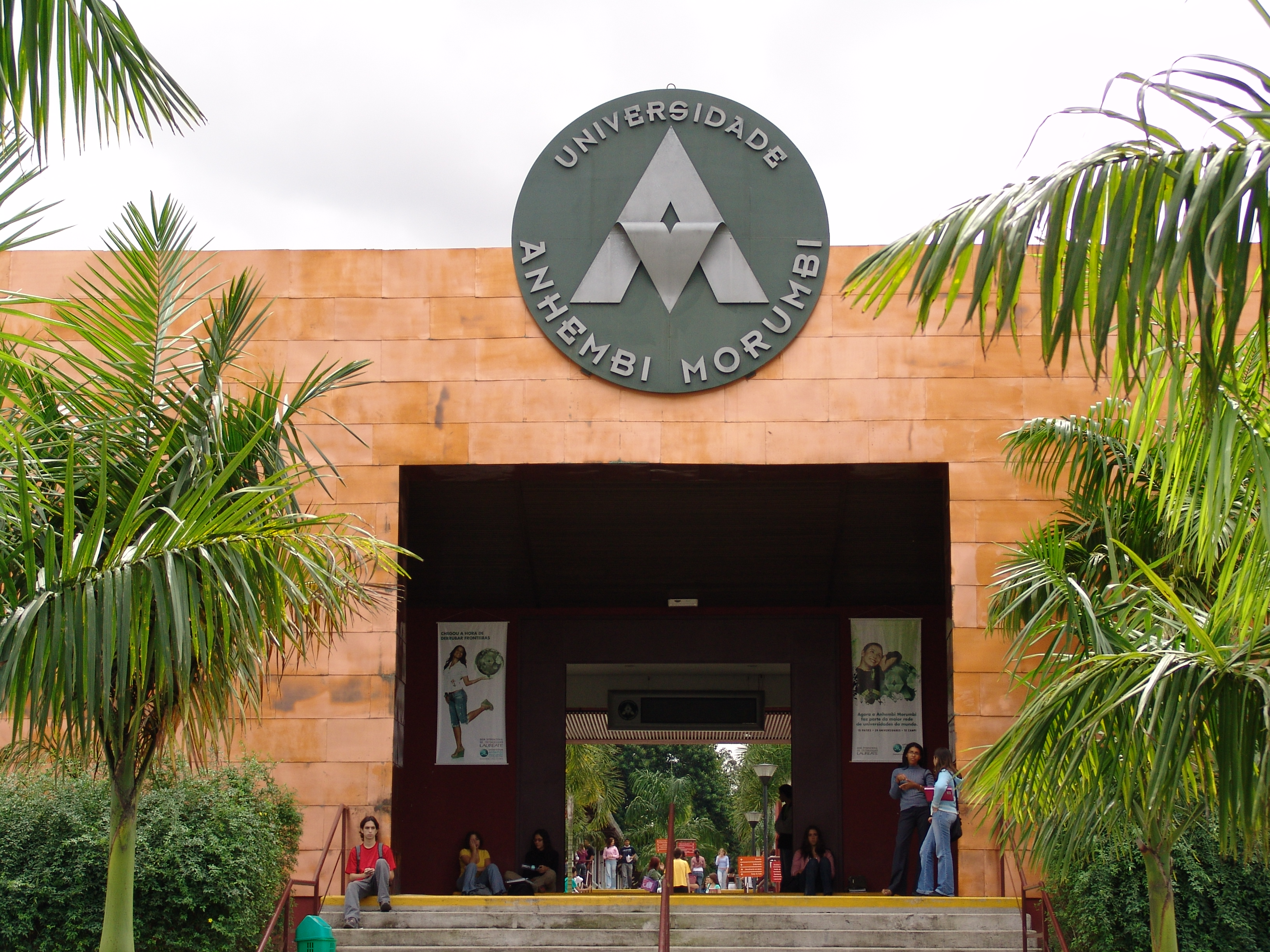
Universidade Anhembi Morumbi

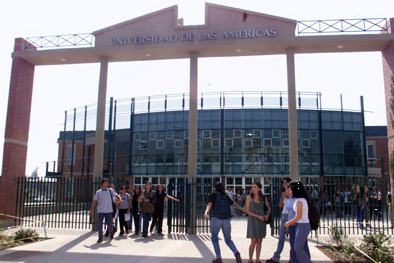
Universidad de Las Américas Chile
