= McIlwain =

McIlwain is a surname. Notable people with the surname include:

- Alfie McIlwain (born 1998), English actor
- Charles Howard McIlwain (1871–1968), American historian and political scientist
- Dallas McIlwain (born 1982), Australian rugby league player
- David McIlwain (1921–1981), English science fiction writer
- Douglas McIlwain (born 1968), English local politician Mayor of Huntingdon
- James McIlwain, American ophthalmologist
- Serena McIlwain, American government official
- Stover McIlwain (1939–1966), American baseball player
- Wally McIlwain (1903–1963), American football player
- Zach McIlwain (born 1986), American national veterans advocate
