= CATC Design School =

Private school in Australia

CATC Design School at Torrens University Australia
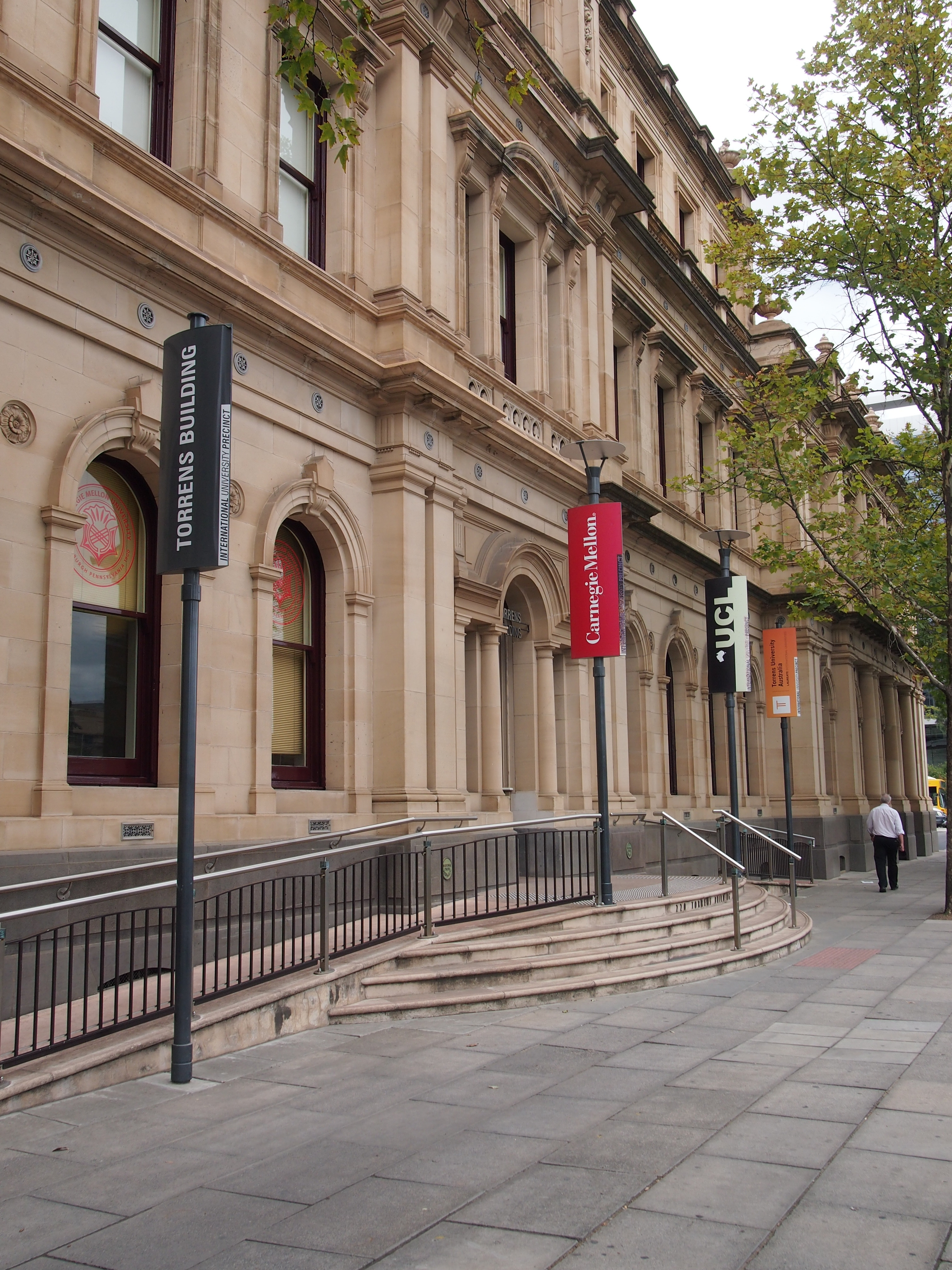
- The historic Torrens Building in Victoria Square, Adelaide
- Motto: Love what you do
- Type: Private
- Established: 1982
- Chancellor: Jim Varghese AM
- Vice-Chancellor: Justin Beilby
- Location: Sydney, Melbourne, Adelaide, Brisbane, Australia
- Campus: Urban
- Website: www.torrens.edu.au/about/our-heritage/catc
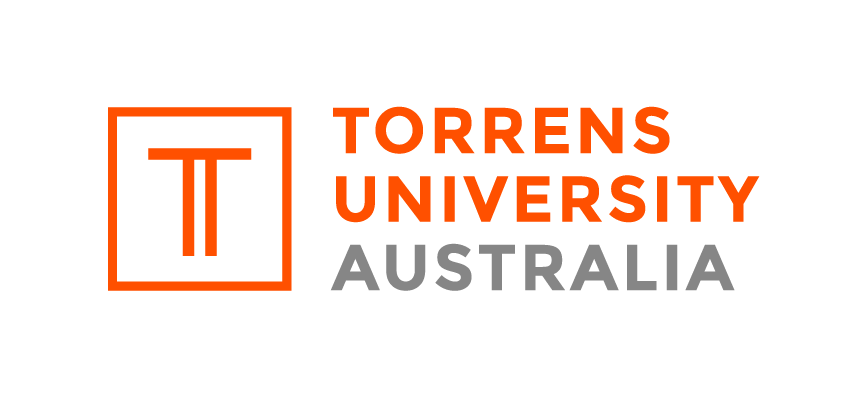

CATC Design School is an Australian private vocational education and training institution focused on graphic design, photography and interior design. The school first opened in 1982 as the Commercial Arts Training College. The college is a part of an education provider Torrens University Australia, itself part of the Strategic Education, Inc. group.

In 2013, CATC Design School staff were invited to take part in various design-related workshops on behalf of the school as part of Vivid Ideas in Sydney.

Other Torrens University colleges include: Billy Blue College of Design, APM College of Business and Communication, William Blue College of Hospitality Management, Southern School of Natural Therapies, Australian National College of Beauty, Australasian College of Natural Therapies and Jansen Newman Institute. Together these colleges have in excess of 19,000 students enrolled.

== Courses ==
The college offers vocational diplomas in Graphic Design, Photo Imaging, and Interior Design and Decoration. It also offers a short course in creative digital photography, which is not accredited.

== Campuses ==
CATC Design School has campuses in Sydney, Melbourne, Brisbane and the Gold Coast. In 2014, the college relocated two of its campuses to new sites in Brisbane (Fortitude Valley) and Sydney (Ultimo). Ultimo campus and its builder, JDV Projects, were recognised by the New South Wales Master Builders Association in December of that year by receiving an Excellence Award for ‘Best Interior Fitout’.

The Ultimo and Melbourne campuses are shared with partner college Billy Blue College of Design, while Brisbane is also shared with Billy Blue College of Design as well as several other Think Education colleges. Gold Coast campus is home to CATC Design School exclusively.
