= Chifley Business School =

Australian postgraduate school

Coordinates: 34°55′41″S 138°36′04″E

Chifley Business School is an Australian postgraduate school established in 1989. Chifley is one of the longest-running independent higher education institutions in Australia, and has the country's largest online learning MBA program.

The school is owned by Torrens University Australia and has become a part of Strategic Education, Inc. Postgraduate courses are delivered through the joint institution ‘Chifley Business School at Torrens University Australia’. The school's vocational courses were transferred to APM College of Business and Communication, another Laureate International Universities institution.

The school takes its name from Ben Chifley - 16th Prime Minister of Australia.

== History ==
Chifley Business School was born out of the Association of Professional Engineers, Scientists and Managers, Australia (APESMA). APESMA introduced a Graduate Diploma of Management postgraduate course of study aimed largely at professional engineers. The course launched in 1989 under the banner of APESMA Management Education and had 747 students enrol, which made it the largest online postgraduate management program in Australia at its commencement.

In the following years, new postgraduate courses were introduced and were offered as joint awards with Deakin University. In 1998, APESMA Management Education welcomed its 5000th graduate.

In 2002, APESMA Management Education alumni welcomed its 10,000th graduate. APESMA also establishes an agency agreement to market its postgraduate programs in India and the United Arab Emirates.

In 2004, APESMA Management Education was rebranded as Chifley Business School.

In 2008, Chifley ranked fourth in the Value for Money category at the Australian Financial Review’s Boss Magazine MBA survey.

More recognition followed in 2011 when Chifley was ranked as a Top 20 MBA provider in Australia by the Australian Financial Review's Boss Magazine MBA survey including #1 Distance Education Provider and #3 in the Value for Money category.

Chifley Business School was acquired by the Australian Graduate School of Business in October 2012.

In 2015, Torrens University Australia purchased Chifley Business School.

== Courses ==
- Master of Business Administration
- Graduate Diploma of Business Administration
- Graduate Certificate of Business Administration

Specialisations in Project Management or Technology Management are also offered.

== Recognition ==
Chifley Business School was ranked in the Top 20 MBA Providers in Australia by the Australian Financial Review's Boss Magazine in 2011, 2013 and 2014. In 2008, it was also ranked 4th for Value for Money.

== Campuses ==
While largely delivered online, Chifley Business School provides access through Torrens University Australia campuses in Sydney, Melbourne, Brisbane and Adelaide. It also offers courses through the Institute of Banking and Business Management, Papua New Guinea, and Al Tareeqah Management Studies (FZE) in the United Arab Emirates.
