= Strayer University =

For-profit university in Washington, D.C., US

- Former names: Strayer's Business College; Strayer College
- Motto: Transformation through Education
- Type: Private for-profit university
- Established: 1892; 134 years ago
- Parent institution: Strategic Education, Inc.
- Accreditation: MSCHE
- President: Antoinette Farmer-Thompson
- Students: 52,253
- Location: Washington, D.C., U.S.
- Campus: 35 U.S. campuses 1 international Online
- Website: Official website

Strayer University is a private for-profit university headquartered in Washington, D.C. It was founded in 1892 as Strayer's Business College and later became Strayer College, before being granted university status in 1998.

Strayer University operates under the publicly traded holding company Strategic Education, Inc., which was established in 1996 and rebranded in 2018 following its merger with Capella University.

Strayer enrolls more than 50,000 students through both its online learning programs and 35 campuses located throughout 14 U.S. states and Washington, D.C. with an additional location in Auckland, New Zealand. It offers in degree programs for working adults and offers undergraduate and graduate degrees in accounting, business administration, criminal justice, education, health services administration, information technology and public administration.

== History ==
=== 19th century ===
Siebert Irving Strayer founded Strayer's Business College in Baltimore in 1892. Strayer established the college to teach business skills to former farm workers, including shorthand, typing and accounting. Thomas W. Donoho joined the school in 1902.

In its first decade of operations, enrollment at the school gradually increased, attracting students from other states.

=== 20th century ===
In 1904, Strayer opened a branch of the school in Washington, D.C.

Enrollment further expanded as demand for trained accountants grew after the passage of the Revenue Act of 1913 and World War I increased the need for federal government clerks with office skills. During the 1930s, the college was authorized to grant collegiate degrees in accountancy by the Washington, D.C., board of education. The school founded Strayer Junior College in 1959, when it was given the right to confer two-year degrees. In 1969, the college received the accreditation needed to grant four-year Bachelor of Arts degrees and was renamed Strayer College.

From the 1980s to the late 1990s, Strayer College grew rapidly; enrollment increased from approximately 1,800 in 1981 and 2,000 in 1983, to around 9,000 by 1997. The college expanded the range of degree programs and courses it offered to include subjects such as data processing management and health care management. In 1987, the college was given authorization to grant Master of Science degrees.

During the 1990s, the college began to focus on offering information technology courses. According to The Washington Times, high demand for computer training due to the increased use of computers in offices and movement toward "knowledge-based" employment led to higher enrollment at Strayer. In addition, Strayer began providing training programs in computer information systems for companies including AT&T Corporation and government agencies such as the Internal Revenue Service. In 1996, the college launched Strayer Online to offer classes via the Internet.

In 1998, Strayer College was granted university status by the District of Columbia Education Licensure Commission and became Strayer University.

=== 21st century ===
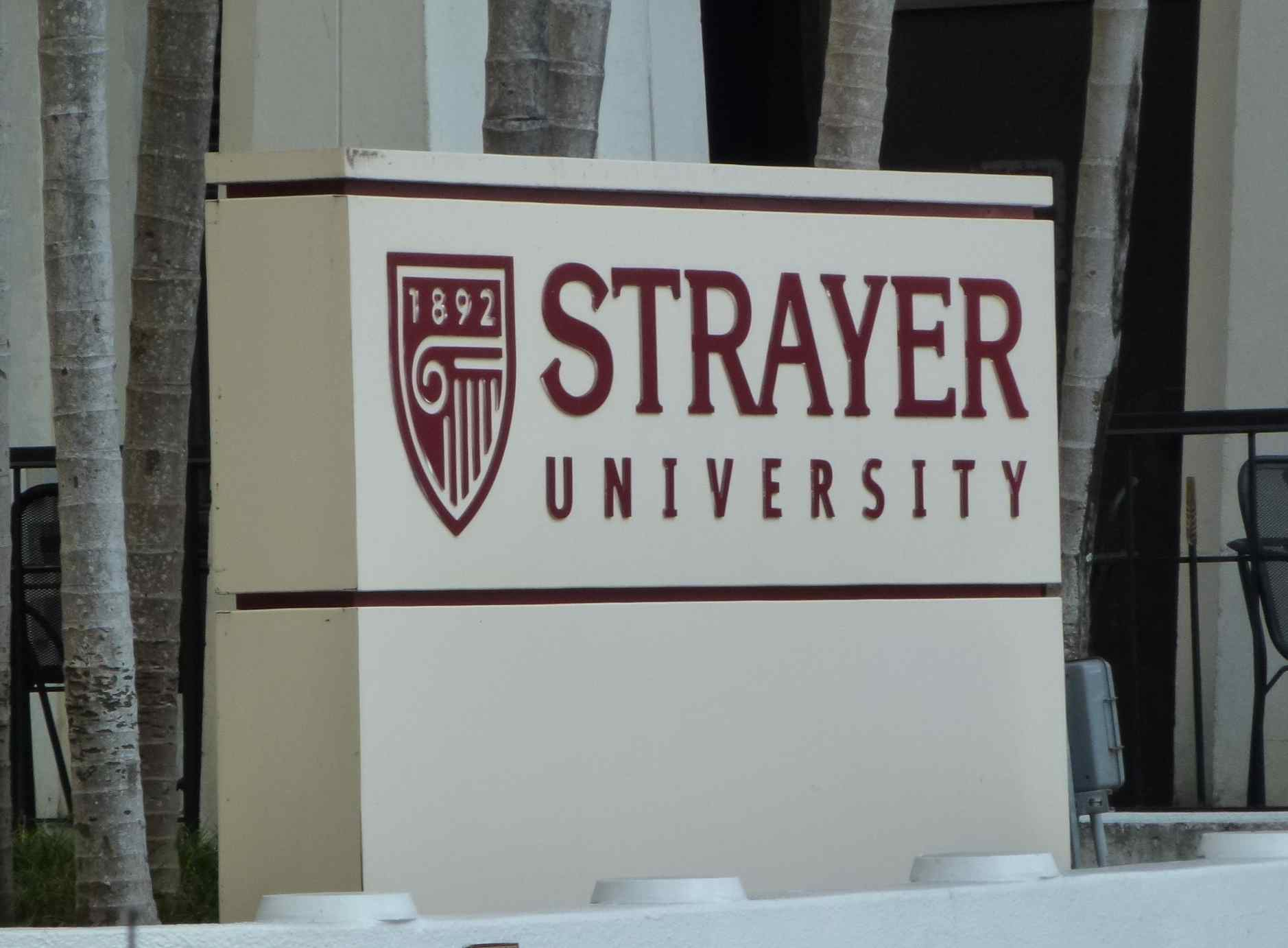
Strayer University's campus in Miami

At the beginning of the 21st century, Strayer established its first campus locations outside of the Washington metropolitan area, adding campuses in Florida, Georgia, North Carolina, Pennsylvania, South Carolina, and Tennessee. Since the early 21st century, Strayer has added additional campuses in Alabama, Arkansas, Delaware, Mississippi, New Jersey, Texas, and West Virginia, according to the university's website.

Sondra Stallard was named the thirteenth president of Strayer University in May 2007. Stallard had been dean since 1996. Stallard previously served as dean of the school of continuing and professional studies at the University of Virginia.

Strayer enrollment grew in the decade 2001–2010, from 14,009 in the fall of 2001 to 60,711 in the fall of 2010. Enrollment dropped to 42,975 by 2015. In 2010 the U.S. Department of Education, reported that the repayment rate of federal student loans at Strayer University was 25 percent. Strayer claimed its loan repayment rate to be 55 percent.

In 2011, the Washington Post claimed that Strayer had a 15 percent graduation rate, listing it among the lowest college graduation rates in the Washington, D.C., area. Strayer claimed the graduation rate for its full cohort of bachelor's students was 33 percent. In December 2011, it acquired the Jack Welch Management Institute from Chancellor University for about $7 million. The institute offers a fully online Executive MBA program, as well as certificate programs. In 2012, Michael Plater was named fourteenth president of Strayer University. Previously, he served as provost and chief academic officer.

On August 9, 2012, the syndicated comic strip Doonesbury described Strayer's unusually high executive compensation as part of a series of satirical strips on for-profit education. In addition to reporting Silberman's 2009 compensation (which it described as fifty times more than Harvard's president), the strip said that in the same year that Strayer spent $1,300 per student on instruction, it spent $2,500 per student on marketing and returned $4,500 per student in profit.

In 2013, USA Today listed Strayer University of Washington D.C. as a "red flag" institution for posting a student loan default rate that surpassed its graduation rate. In July 2013, Strayer University contacted HSI Sterling to report suspicious activity surrounding academic transcripts and coursework. It was later found that from November 2012 to October 2013, a Strayer University admissions official with two co-conspirators fraudulently created at least 58 official Strayer University transcripts. The conspirators were ordered to forfeit nearly $300,000 of proceeds from the fraud to the United States government. In October 2013, Strayer initiated a major change in its physical operations by announcing the closure of its 20 Midwest campus locations. Strayer reported total enrollments dropped 17 percent, while new enrollments dropped 23 percent. It was announced that all students currently enrolled in programs in the Midwest at the time would be able to continue their education through Strayer's online only program offerings.

In 2015, Brian Jones, who had previously been Strayer University's general counsel, was named its 15th president. Prior to joining Strayer University, Jones was a lawyer and higher education entrepreneur. He served as General Counsel of the U.S. Department of Education from 2001 until 2005.

In January 2016, Strayer Education announced that acquired the New York Code + Design Academy (NYCDA), making it a wholly owned subsidiary of Strayer Education offering web and mobile development courses. Strayer resumed expansion again in 2018 after opening a campus in Montgomery, Alabama.

In response to the COVID-19 pandemic, Strayer temporarily closed all its campuses, and began advertising heavily for people to enroll as remote students. At least 18 Strayer campuses closed permanently in 2020 as a result. Strayer University has reopened 50 campuses that had been closed during the COVID-19 pandemic, and stated that it would evaluate reopening additional campuses in 2022.

In September 2025, Media Design School, located in New Zealand, joined Strayer.

Strayer won Division II of the 2025 National Security Agency's Codebreaker Challenge.

== Partnerships ==
Comedian and game show host Steve Harvey was a spokesperson for Strayer and has appeared in several advertisements and spoke at Strayer's commencement ceremony in May 2015. Strayer partnered with Daily Mail in February 2015 to produce a new section of the Daily Mail site named Strayer Business News. As part of the deal, Daily Mail would co-produce education and business content for its new business section.

Strayer announced the launch of Strayer@Work, a new performance improvement solution for businesses in May 2015. As part of the launch, Strayer also announced a partnership with Fiat Chrysler Automobiles (FCA) to offer free college education to all participating FCA dealership employees. FCA dealers pay a monthly fee to send employees to Strayer. Strayer has educational partnerships with approximately 300 Fortune 1000 companies.

In March 2017, Strayer announced a collaboration with financial news network Cheddar to produce digital entrepreneurship specialization as a part of Strayer's MBA program.

In 2018, Queen Latifah became a spokesperson for Strayer.

DevMountain partners with Strayer University to provide web development programs. In May 2023, DevMountain announced an expansion of its in-person coding bootcamps at Strayer University facilities.

== Locations ==
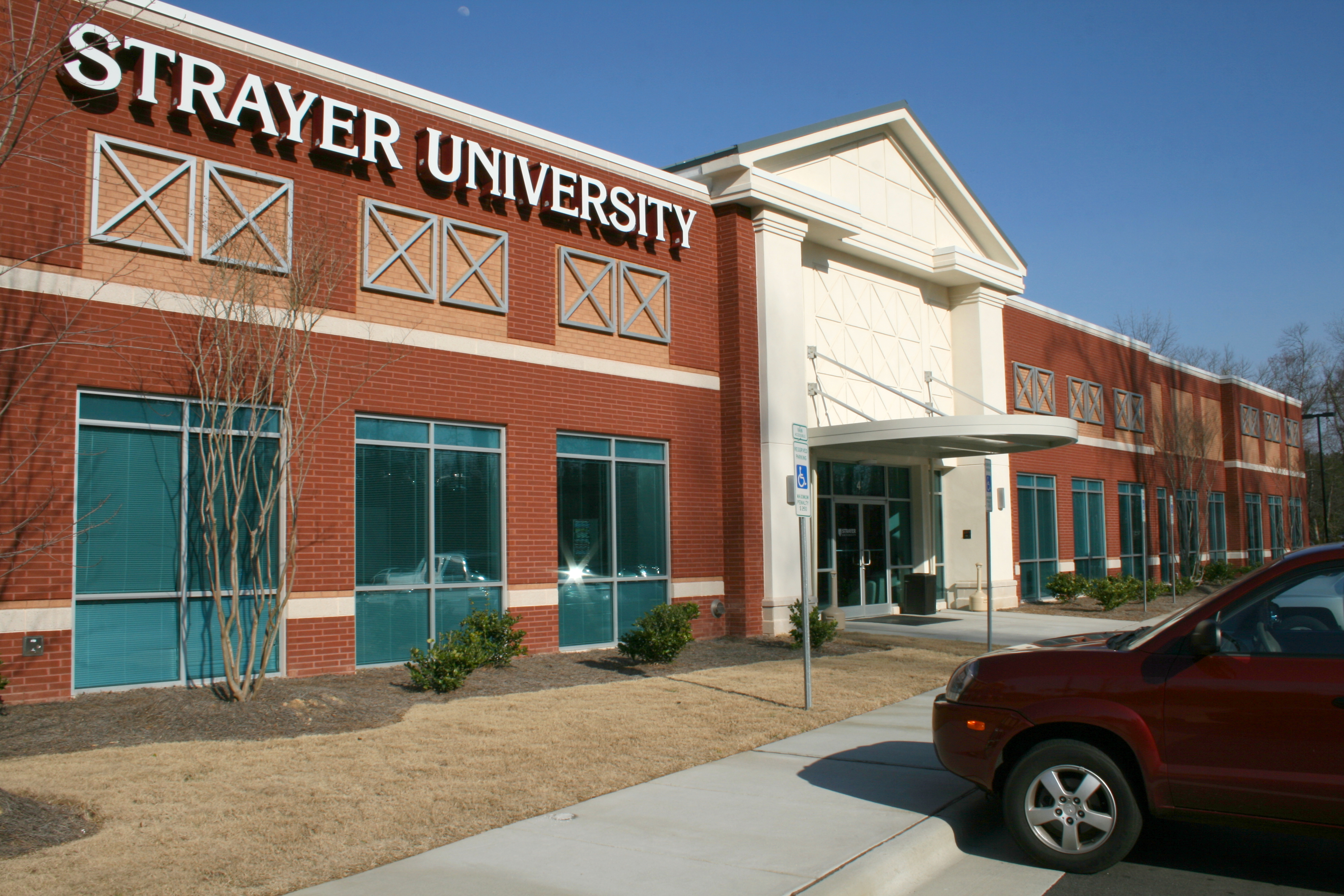
Strayer's campus in Morrisville, North Carolina

More than half of the students enrolled at Strayer University take all of their courses online, and the entire bachelor's and master's degree programs can be completed via the Internet. As of June 2019, Strayer had a total enrollment of 52,253 students.

Strayer University is headquartered in Washington, D.C., with campus locations mainly in the eastern and southern regions of the U.S. As of 2020, it has 35 campuses located in 14 U.S. states and Washington D.C. and 1 international location in Auckland, New Zealand.

== Academics ==
=== Admissions ===
The admissions requirement for undergraduate degree programs at Strayer University is a high school diploma or its equivalent. For graduate degrees (not including the Executive MBA) students must have proof of completion of a baccalaureate degree from an accredited college or university, a cumulative GPA of at least 2.50, and official transcripts from all other colleges or universities attended. Admissions requirements for the Jack Welch Executive MBA program include a minimum 3.0 undergraduate GPA, a baccalaureate degree from an accredited institution in the United States, and 5 years professional experience. An associate degree earned from a partner school can be transferred in its entirety toward a bachelor's degree.

=== Academic programs and accreditation ===
Strayer's principal aim is to provide higher education to working adult students. Strayer University's academic programs include undergraduate and graduate degree programs. The courses are business-focused, including courses in business administration and information technology. Degrees can be earned in subjects such as accounting, business administration, criminal justice, education, health services administration, human resource management, information technology and public administration.

Strayer University is accredited by the Middle States Commission on Higher Education, one of the six regional accrediting bodies recognized by the Department of Education.

The Jack Welch Management Institute, named after Jack Welch, former chief executive officer of General Electric, was acquired by Strayer University in 2011 following Welch's retirement from GE. The institute offers executive MBA degrees and executive certificates covering business-related topics. In September 2016, it was announced that the Jack Welch Management Institute was ranked on Princeton Review's list of Top 25 Online MBA Programs of 2017.

In May 2017, Strayer announced that its Registered Nurse (RN) to Bachelors of Science in Nursing (BSN) program had earned accreditation by the Commission on Collegiate Nursing Education (CCNE).

In 2020, Strayer began offering its Fellows for Justice Program Scholarship, an initiative designed to build leadership skills within students' respective communities.

== Faculty and students ==
Strayer University's total enrollment is greater than 52,000 students. The student body is predominantly women of color. Seventy-four percent of the student body is female and 76 percent are people of color. The average age is 34.

Since the early 2000s, Strayer University has had a high proportion of minority students or people of color. The college has had more women students than men since the late 1990s. According to its then-president, two thirds of its students in 2010 were women, and over half were African American or Hispanic. As of 2010 according to the National Center for Education Statistics, Strayer's student body is 56 percent black, 21 percent white, and 13 percent Hispanic. The majority work full-time.

Many students receive financial assistance from federal government financial aid programs or education assistance programs operated by the U.S. Department of Defense and U.S. Department of Veterans Affairs. As of 2010, the U.S. federal government accounted for 84.9 percent of Strayer's revenue. Approximately one-quarter of Strayer students receive tuition assistance from their employers.

=== Faculty ===
In 2012, a United States Senate committee reported that, as of 2010, 83 percent of Strayer's 2,471 faculty members were employed part-time, and not required to do research. Strayer's online segment consists of 90 full-time instructors and 847 part-time instructors.

=== Student outcomes ===
According to research from the Brookings Institution, Strayer University students hold approximately $8 billion in student loan debt, the fifth-largest among all U.S. colleges and universities. The 5-year default rate of Strayer students is 31%, and the average repayment of debt after five years is -6%. According to the College Scorecard, Strayer University's 8-year graduation rate varies from 3% (Arkansas) to 26% (Virginia), depending on the campus. Strayer is one of several for-profit schools which have been criticized for identifying as a university, since it does not offer Ph.D. programs. Most people who start their college studies at Strayer do not graduate.

== Alumni ==
Notable alumni of Strayer University include:

- Gen. Robert Magnus, retired assistant commandant of the Marine Corps
- Charles Mann, businessman and former NFL football player
- Serena McIlwain, secretary of the Maryland Department of the Environment
- M. Virginia Rosenbaum, American surveyor and newspaper editor
- Carolyn Wright, American lawyer, jurist and the chief justice of the Fifth Court of Appeals of Texas
- Marie Hirst Yochim, 35th president general of the Daughters of the American Revolution
- Gary Washington, CIO of the U.S. Department of Agriculture and acting United States secretary of agriculture from January 2025 to February 2025

== Strategic Education Inc. ==
Strategic Education Inc. is a publicly traded corporation, established as a holding company for the college and other assets in 1996. The company was created to take what was then Strayer College public and raise capital for expansion.

In August 2018, Strayer Education Inc. merged with Capella Education Company to form Strategic Education, Inc.
