= Southern School of Natural Therapies =

Southern School of Natural Therapies at Torrens University Australia
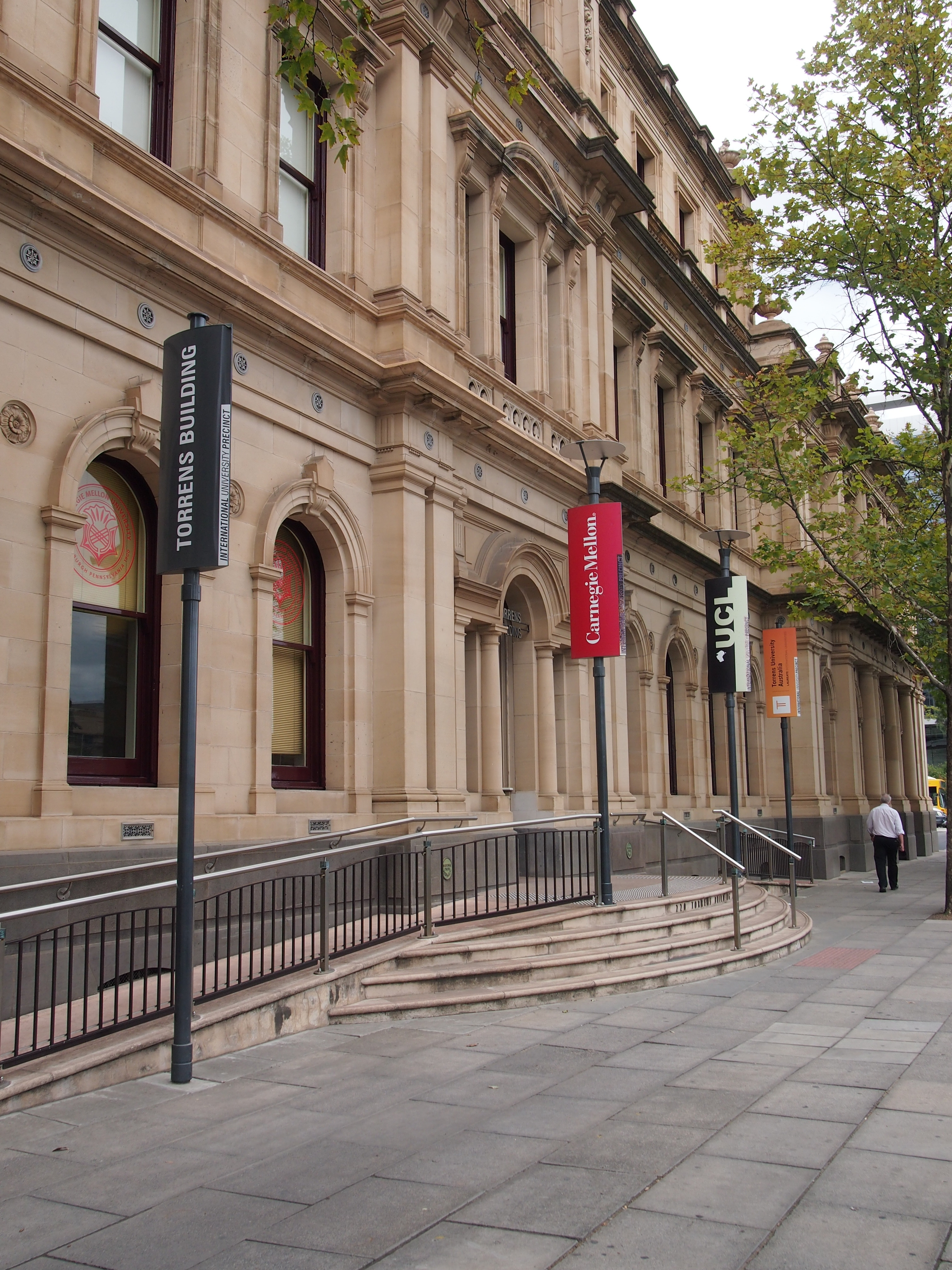
- The historic Torrens Building in Victoria Square, Adelaide
- Motto: Love what you do
- Type: Private
- Established: 1961
- Chancellor: Jim Varghese AM
- Vice-Chancellor: Justin Beilby
- Location: Sydney, Melbourne, Adelaide, Brisbane, Australia
- Campus: Urban
- Website: www.torrens.edu.au/about/our-heritage/ssnt
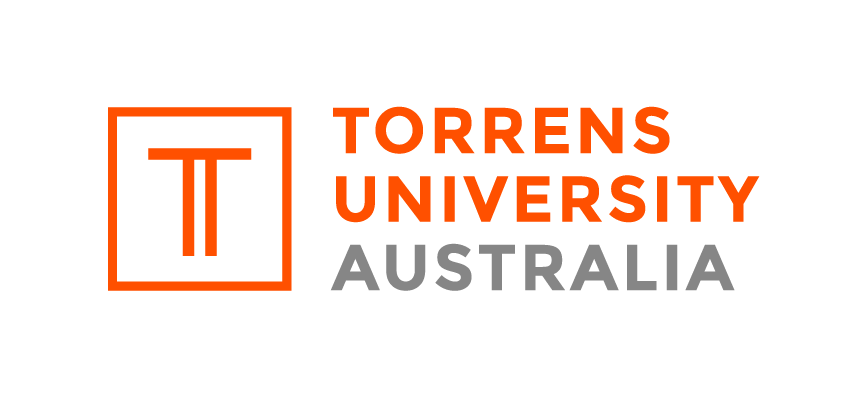

Southern School of Natural Therapies (SSNT) is the longest-standing institution in Natural Therapies that offers both tertiary education and vocational education and training. The School became a part of education provider Torrens University Australia in 2014, itself part of the Strategic Education, Inc. group.

Other Torrens University colleges include: Billy Blue College of Design, CATC Design School, APM College of Business and Communication, William Blue College of Hospitality Management, Australian National College of Beauty, Australasian College of Natural Therapies and Jansen Newman Institute. Together these colleges have more than 19,000 students enrolled.

== History ==
The school was established in 1961 by Alfred Jacka and was originally known as the Victorian Branch of the Australian National Association of Naturopaths, Osteopaths and Chiropractors. It is the first college in Victoria to gain degree accreditation for coursework in naturopathy (1997) and clinical myotherapy.

In 1981, the college was renamed the Southern School of Natural Therapies and in 1983 expanded to include separate coursework in massage. Prior to this, massage was integrated with the naturopathy coursework. In 1997, the School became the first private education provider to gain degree accreditation for naturopathy, accepting students for degree-level coursework in 1998.

In 2002, the School added degree programs for Traditional Chinese Medicine and in 2003 became the first in Australia to gain degree level accreditation for coursework in Clinical Myotherapy.

The School was acquired by Think Education (then the Think: Education Group) in 2010. After this purchase, the school business model changed and it joined Think Education’s other colleges.

SSNT became part of Torrens University Australia Health in 2014.

== Courses ==
Southern School of Natural Therapies offers bachelor's degree-level courses in Health Science specialising in Naturopathy, Nutritional Medicine, Clinical Myotherapy, Western Herbal Medicine and Chinese Medicine. Additionally, a Diploma of Health Science as well as programs in Massage for both certificate and diplomas levels are available.

== The Practice Wellbeing Centre ==
The School operates a student-run, public-facing clinic, the Practice Wellbeing Centre, where students are able to practice on paying clients as part of their coursework. Each clinic session is supervised by a qualified and experienced practitioner. Students may also arrange practical training with an external complementary health provider.

== Recognition ==
The School’s courses are recognised by the following organisations:

- Australian Natural Therapists Association (ANTA)
- Health Services Union – Professional Branch (HSU-PB)
- National Herbalists’ Association of Australia (NHAA)
- Chinese Medicine Registration Board of Victoria (CMRBV)
- The Australian Acupuncture and Chinese Medicine Association (AACMA)
- Australian Association of Massage Therapists (AAMT)
- Association of Massage Therapists (AMT)
- Massage Association of Australia (MAA).
