= Billy Blue College of Design =

Australian private design college

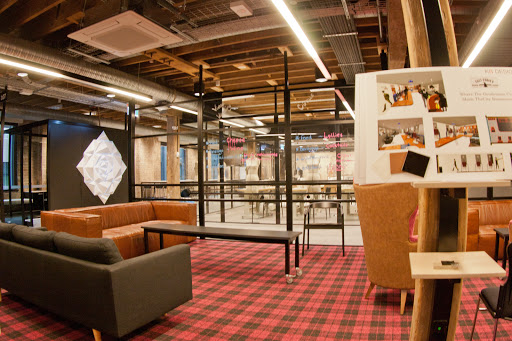
- Campus in Ultimo
- Motto: Create trouble
- Type: Private
- Established: 1987; 39 years ago
- Affiliations: Torrens University Australia
- Location: Sydney, Brisbane & Melbourne, Australia
- Campus: Urban
- Website: torrens.edu.au/billy-blue-college-of-design
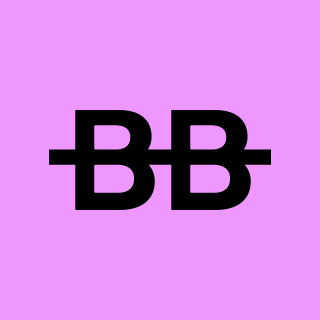

Billy Blue College of Design is an Australian private design college with campuses in Sydney, Melbourne and Brisbane. It is focused on teaching a combination of design disciplines including graphic design, digital media, branded fashion, interior design, gaming, 3D design and animation, user experience design, and communication design.

The college is named for Billy Blue, an African American figure in Australian colonial history, arriving on the First Fleet and credited as the founder of Sydney's North Shore.

The college is part of Torrens University Australia, itself part of Strategic Education, Inc. The college was previously part of Think Education which was owned by SEEK Learning.

Current and former Torrens University colleges include: APM College of Business and Communication, CATC Design School, William Blue College of Hospitality Management, Southern School of Natural Therapies, Australian National College of Beauty, Australasian College of Natural Therapies and Jansen Newman Institute. Together these colleges have in excess of 19,000 students enrolled.

== History ==
Billy Blue College of Design began in 1977 as 'Billy Blue' - a magazine publishing colloquial Australian writing. The magazine was started by Ross Renwick and Aaron Kaplan.

As time passed, various companies used the studio that produced the magazine for their own needs and in 1980, a consultancy, Billy Blue Creative, was formed and won multiple awards before it took a hiatus in 2009 and in 2017 sprang back into action. The studio's work covers all aspects of visual communications including brand creation and implementation, corporate and marketing communications, multimedia and web-based projects, signage and exhibition graphics as well as advertising and publishing.

In 1987, unimpressed with the standard of design graduates in Sydney, Renwick decided to use Billy Blue Creative to open a modest design school and train aspiring designers who would eventually come to work in the studio. A crowd of about four was expected; sixty-six students enrolled and there was a long waiting list.

== Courses ==
The college offers diploma and bachelor level courses across graphic and communication design, fashion design, fashion enterprise and marketing, interior design and architectural technology, ux and web design, 3D design and animation, gaming, and photography. A cognate and non-cognate Master of Design is offered, which covers subjects in service design, design leadership and design and business strategy. Higher degree research students also study at Billy Blue.

== Campuses ==
Billy Blue College of Design has campuses in Sydney, Melbourne and Brisbane. In 2014, the college relocated two of its campuses to new sites in Brisbane (Fortitude Valley) and Sydney (Ultimo). Ultimo campus and its builder, JDV Projects, were recognised by the New South Wales Master Builders Association in December of that year by receiving an Excellence Award for ‘Best Interior Fitout’.

In 2025, the Ultimo campus closed and the College relocated to Surry Hills.

== Awards ==
Billy Blue College of Design has produced several award-winning designers, including in the Southern Cross Packaging Awards and Staron Design Awards.

== Design industry connections ==
Part of the college's niche is strong engagement with the wider design industry, including numerous guest speaker appearances hosted at its campuses or as part of public design events. Speakers have included notable design professionals Chris Doyle, Stefan Sagmeister, and Justin Fox, among others.
