= List of pharmacy schools in Australia =

Many Australian universities offer pharmacy degrees, including entry-level degrees which are usually four-year bachelor's or bachelor's with honours degrees. The following universities do not offer pharmacy degrees: Australian Catholic University, Australian National University, Bond University, Central Queensland University, Deakin University (although it offers a bachelor's degree majoring in pharmaceutical science), Edith Cowan University, Federation University Australia, Flinders University, Macquarie University, Murdoch University (seems like it once offered a Master of Pharmacy), Southern Cross University, Swinburne University of Technology, Torrens University Australia, University of Adelaide, University of Melbourne (although a pharmacology major exists), University of Notre Dame Australia, University of Southern Queensland, University of the Sunshine Coast, University of Wollongong, Victoria University and Western Sydney University.

== Table ==
Pharmacy schools in Australia
University	Location(s)	Degree(s)
Charles Darwin University	Darwin and online	MPharm (entry level qualification).
Charles Sturt University	Orange	BPharm
Curtin University	Perth	BPharm (Hons), MPhil and PhD.
Griffith University	Gold Coast	BPharm, BPharm (Hons) and MPharm (entry level qualification).
James Cook University	Cairns, Mackay and Townsville	BPharm (Hons), MPhil (Note: Seems can only be done at Cairns and Townsville and maybe online.) and PhD.
La Trobe University	Bendigo	BPharm (Hons), MPhil and PhD.
Monash University	Melbourne	BPharm (Hons), BPharm (Hons)/MPharm, MPhil and PhD.
Queensland University of Technology	Brisbane	BPharm (Hons).
RMIT University	Melbourne	BPharm (Hons).
University of Canberra	Canberra	BPharm and MPharm.
University of New England	Armidale and online	BPharm (Hons), MPhil and PhD.
University of New South Wales	Sydney	BPharmMed/MPharm, MRes and PhD.
University of Newcastle	Newcastle	BPharm (Hons).
University of Queensland	Brisbane	BPharm (Hons), GCertClinPharm, GCertPharmPrac, MClinPharm, MPharmIndPrac, MPhil and PhD.
University of South Australia	Adelaide	BPharm (Hons), GCertPharmPrac, MClinPharm and PhD.
University of Sydney	Sydney	BPharm (Hons)/MPharmPrac, BPharmMgmt (Hons)/MPharmPrac, GCertPharmPrac, MPharm, MPhil and PhD.
University of Tasmania	Cradle Coast, Hobart and Launceston	DipPharmSt (not at Cradle Coast), BPharm (Hons). GCertClinPharm, (Note: Only offered online) GDipClinPharm, MClinPharm and PhD.
University of Technology Sydney	Sydney	GCertAdvPharmPrac and MPharm.
University of Western Australia	Perth	MPharm and PhD.
