= List of psychology schools in Australia =

In Australia, to be registered as a psychologist by the Psychology Board of Australia, one has to satisfy either of the following criteria:

- Complete five years of psychology university education, then complete a year of supervised practice and pass the National Psychology Exam (NPE).
- Complete at least six years of psychology university education.

Prior to 30 June 2022, a third pathway was available for new applicants wanting to become a registered psychologist in Australia, it was called the "4+2 pathway" and consisted of four years of university education followed by two years of supervised practice and passing the NPE.

== Table ==
Psychology schools in Australia
University	Location(s)	Degree(s) (Note: Only single degrees in psychology itself are listed, unless the psychology-related degree in the double degree is not available as a single degree. Not including counselling and psychotherapy degrees.)
Australian Catholic University	Melbourne and Sydney	BPsychSc, BPsych (Hons), MPsych, MProfPsych (only offered in Melbourne), MPhil and PhD.
Australian National University	Canberra	BSc(Psych), BPsych (Hons), MClinPsych, MProfPsych, MPhil and PhD.
Bond University	Gold Coast	BPsychSc, BPsychSc (Hons), GDipPsychSc, GDipPsych(Brid), MProfPsych and MPsych(Clin).
Central Queensland University	Adelaide, Bundaberg, Cairns, Rockhampton, Townsville and online	BPsychSc, BSc(Psych), BPsychSc (Hons), (Note: Only available online) MClinPsych (Rockhampton only) and MProfPsych.
Charles Darwin University	Darwin and online	DipPsych, BPsychSc (graduate entry one year counterpart exists), BPsychSc (Hons), MPsych(Clin) (Darwin only), MRes and PhD.
Charles Sturt University	Bathurst, Port Macquarie and online	DipPsychSt, UCertPsychSt, BSocSc(Psych), BPsych, BSocSc(Psych) (Hons), GCertIslamPsych, GDipPsych, PGDipPsych, MClinPsych, MProfPsych, MPsychPrac and PhD.
Curtin University	Perth	UCertPsych, BPsych, GCertHealthPsych, MClinPsych, MPsych, MPsych(Prof), MRes and PhD.
Deakin University	Geelong, Melbourne, Warrnambool and online	BPsychSc, BA(Psych), (Note: Not available at Warrnambool.) BPsych (Hons), GDipPsychSc, GDipPsych(Adv), MPsych(Clin), MPsych(Org), (Note: Only offered in Melbourne) MProfPsych, MPhil (only offered at Geelong), DPsych(Clin) (only offered at Melbourne) and PhD.
Edith Cowan University	Perth and online	BPsych, BPsychCouns, BPsych (Hons), GCertPsych, GDipPsych, GDipPsych(Adv), MClinPsych (only offered on campus at Perth) MProfPsych (only offered on campus in Perth).
Federation University Australia	Ballarat, Gippsland, Melbourne and online	BPsychSc, BPsychSc (Hons), MProfPsych (only offered at Ballarat), MPsych(Clin) (only offered at Ballarat), MAppSc (Note: Master's degree by research) and PhD.
Flinders University	Adelaide and online	BHealthSc(Psych), (Note: Not offered online) BPsychSc, BPsych (Hons), GDipPsych(Adv), MProfPsych, MPsych(Clin) and PhD.
Griffith University	Brisbane and Gold Coast	DipPsychSc, BPsychSc, BPsychSc (Hons), BPsych (Hons), MClinPsych, MClinPsychPrac, MProfPsych and PhD.
James Cook University	Townsville and online	BPsychSc (Townsville only), BPsychSc (Hons), GCertPsych, GDipPsych, MProfPsych, MPhil and PhD.
La Trobe University	Albury-Wodonga, Bendigo, Melbourne and online	BPsychSc, BPsychSc (Hons), BPsych (Hons), MAdvProfPsych, MClinPsych (Melbourne only), MProfPsych, MPsychSc(Res) (Melbourne only), MPhil and PhD.
Macquarie University	Sydney	BPsych, MClinNeurPsych, MClinPsych, MOrgPsych, MProfPsych and MRes.
Monash University	Malaysia and Melbourne	BPsych, and BPsych (Hons), GDipPsych, GDipPsychAdv, GDipProfPsych (only Melbourne), MProfPsych (only Melbourne), MEdDevPsych (only at Melbourne), MEdDevPsychAdv (only at Melbourne) and PhD.
Murdoch University	Perth	BA(Psych), BSc(Psych), BA(Psych) (Hons), BSc(Psych) (Hons), GDipPsych, MAppPsych(Prof), MAppPsychClinPsych, MPhil, DPsych(ClinPsych) and PhD.
Queensland University of Technology	Brisbane	BBehSc(Psych), BBehSc(Psych) (Hons), MClinPsych, MPsych(EdDev), MPhil and PhD.
RMIT University	Melbourne and online	BAppSc(Psych) (Hons), BCrimPsych (Melbourne only), BPsych, BSocSc(Psych), GDipPsych, MClinPsych, MSc(Psych) and PhD.
Southern Cross University	Coffs Harbour, Gold Coast and online	DipHealth(PsychSc), BPsychSc, BPsychSc (Hons), MProfPsych, MThes and PhD.
Swinburne University of Technology	Melbourne and online	BHealthSc(PsychForSc), BPsych (Hons), (Note: Only offered in Melbourne.) BPsychSc, BPsychSc (Hons), GDipForPsych, GDipPsych, GDipPsych(Adv), MPsych(ClinPsych), MRes and PhD (includes an integrated counterpart).
Torrens University Australia	Online	BPsychSc.
University of Adelaide	Adelaide	BPsychSc, BPsych(Adv) (Hons), BPsychSc (Hons), GDipPsych (online), GDipPsych(Adv) (online), MPhil and PhD.
University of Canberra	Canberra	BSc(Psych), BSc(Psych) (Hons), MClinPsych and PhD.
University of Melbourne	Melbourne	BA(Psych), BSc(Psych), BSc(ExtPsych), BBiomed(Psych), BA(Psych) (Hons), BSc(Psych) (Hons), BSc(ExtPsych) (Hons), BBiomed(Psych) (Hons), GDipPsych, GDipPsych(Adv), MAppPosPsych (also offered online), MAppPsych, MProfPsych, MPsych(ClinNeuroPsych), MPsych(ClinPsych), MPhil and PhD.
University of New England	Armidale and online	UCertPsychSc, AdvDipArts, BA(Psych), BPsychSc, BSocSc(Psych), BPsych (Hons) (online only), GDipPsych, MProfPsych (online only), MPsych(Clin), MPhil and PhD.
University of New South Wales	Sydney	BPsychSc, BSc(Psych), BAdvSc(Psych) (Hons), BPsychSc (Hons), BPsych (Hons), GDipPsych, MPsych(Clin), MPsych(For), MClinNeurPsych, MRes and PhD.
University of Newcastle	Newcastle, Central Coast, New South Wales and online	BA(PsychSt), (Note: Not offered in the Central Coast.) BPsychSc, BPsychSc(Adv), (Note: Only offered on campus in Newcastle.) BSocSc(PsychSt), BPsychSc (Hons), BSocSc(PsychSt) (Hons), GDipPsychSc, MBusPsych, MClinPsych, MProfPsych, MPhil and PhD.
University of Notre Dame Australia	Fremantle and Sydney	BA(Psych), BA(Psych) (Hons) and MProfPsych.
University of Queensland	Brisbane	BA(Psych), BSc(Psych), BPsychSc (Hons), MBusPsych, MClinNeuroPsychClinPsych, MClinPsych, MOrgPsych, MPsych, MPhil and PhD.
University of South Australia	Adelaide and online	BA(Psych), BPsych, BPsych (Hons), BPsychScSoc, MPsych(Clin), MRes and PhD.
University of Southern Queensland	Ipswich, Toowoomba, external and online	UCertPsychFund, BSc(Psych), (Note: No external offering, except online.) BSc(PsychExt), (Note: Not offered online nor Toowoomba.) BSc(Psych) (Hons), (Note: Not offered externally or at Toowoomba.) BPsych (Hons) MClinPsych, MClinPsychAdvEnt, MProfPsych, MRes and PhD.
University of Sydney	Sydney	BA(PsychSc), BPsych, BSc(PsychSc), BSc(Health)(PsychSc), GCertCoachPsych, GDipCoachPsych, GDipPsych, MClinPsych, MSc(CoachPsych), MPhil and PhD.
University of Tasmania	Cradle Coast, Tasmania, Hobart, Launceston and online	BPsychSc, BPsychSc (Hons), (Note: Not offered at the Cradle Coast or online) GDipProfPsychPrac, MClinPsych(AdvEnt), MProfPsych, MPsych(Clin) and PhD.
University of Technology Sydney	Sydney and online	BPsych, BPsych (Hons), BPsychSc (Hons), GCertPsych, GDipPsych and GDipPsych(Adv).
University of the Sunshine Coast	Moreton Bay and the Sunshine Coast	BBehSc(Psych), BPsych (Hons), BBehSc(Psych) (Hons), MProfPsych, MPsych(Clin), MA, and PhD.
University of Western Australia	Perth	BA(Psych), BPsych, BSc(Psych), BA(Psych) (Hons), BPsych (Hons), BSc(Psych) (Hons), MBusPsych, MIndOrgPsych, PhD, MClinNeurPsych/PhD, MClinPsych/PhD and MIndOrgPsych/PhD.
University of Wollongong	Wollongong	BA(Psych), BPsychSc, BPsychSc (Hons), BPsych (Hons), MPsych(Clin), MProfPsych, MPhil, PhD and PhDI.
Victoria University	Melbourne	UCertPsychSt, BA(Psych), BPsychSt, BPsychSt (Hons), BPsych (Hons), MAppPsych(ClinPsych), MAppPsych(CommPsych), MProfPsych, PhD and PhD(I).
Western Sydney University	Sydney	BA(Psych), BPsych (Hons), GDipPsych, MClinPsych and MProfPsych.
