= William Blue College of Hospitality Management =

Coordinates: 33°52′38″S 151°12′22″E

William Blue College of Hospitality Management at Torrens University Australia
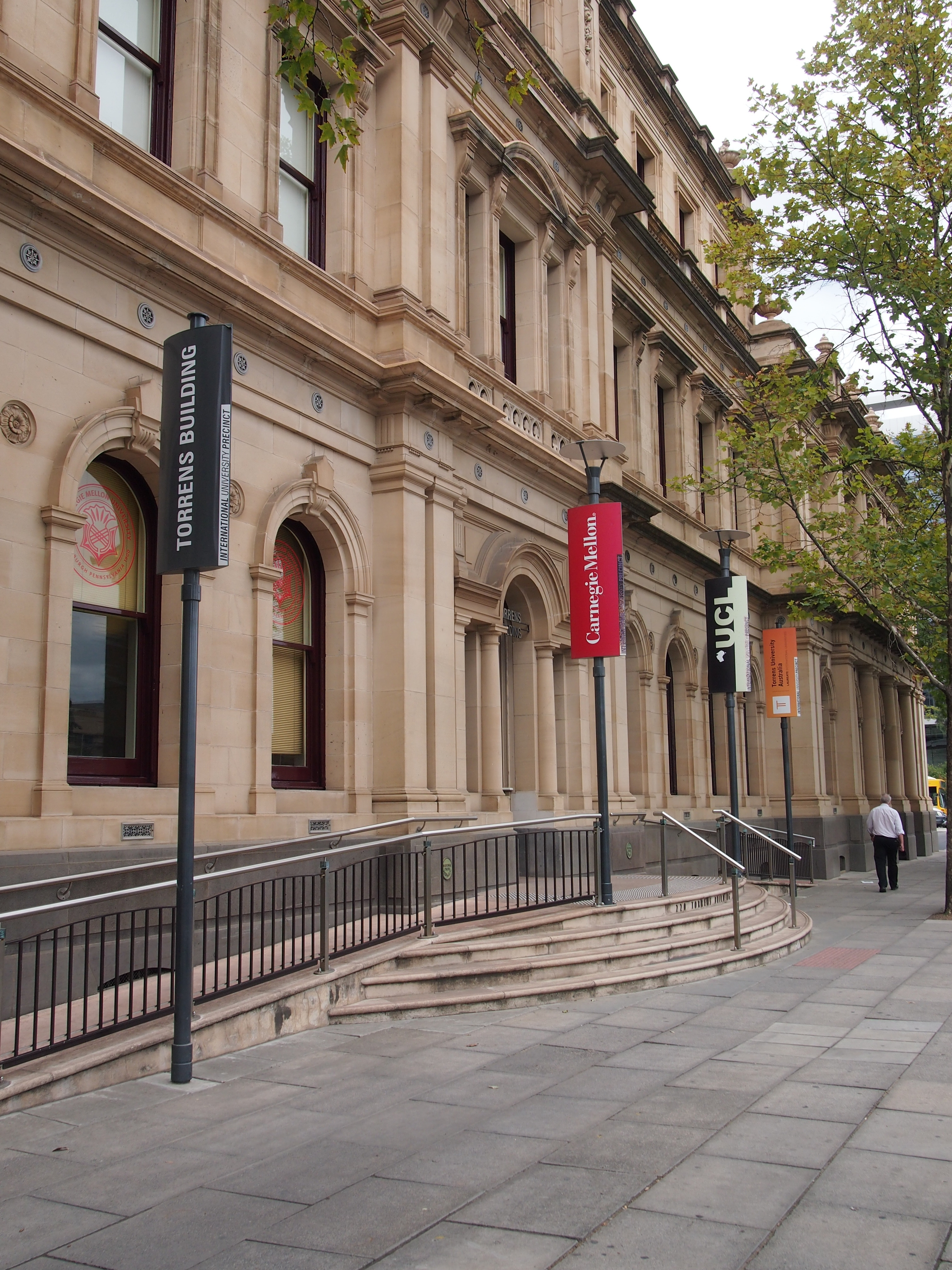
- The historic Torrens Building in Victoria Square, Adelaide
- Motto: Love what you do
- Type: Private
- Established: 1990
- Chancellor: Jim Varghese AM
- Vice-Chancellor: Justin Beilby
- Location: Sydney, Melbourne, Adelaide, Brisbane, Australia
- Campus: Urban
- Website: www.torrens.edu.au/about/our-heritage/william-blue
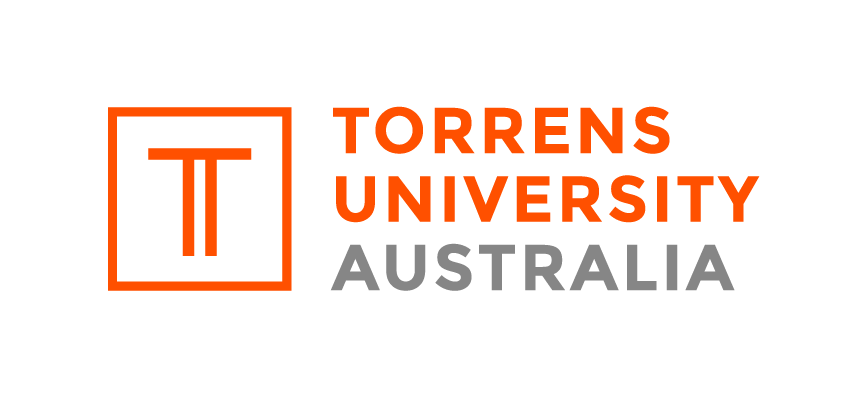

William Blue College of Hospitality Management is an Australian private hospitality college that offers both tertiary education and vocational education and training. The college is a part of Torrens University Australia, itself part of the Strategic Education, Inc. group.

Other Torrens University colleges include: Billy Blue College of Design, CATC Design School, APM College of Business and Communication, Southern School of Natural Therapies, Australian National College of Beauty, Australasian College of Natural Therapies and Jansen Newman Institute. Together these colleges have in excess of 19,000 students enrolled.

== History ==
The college first opened in 1990 as the William Blue International Hotel Management School. The college was named for Billy Blue, a figure in Australian colonial history.

After operating for many years at a campus in North Sydney, the college expanded to Brisbane in 2014 and relocated its Sydney campus to The Rocks in 2015.

William Blue became part of Torrens University Australia Hospitality in 2017.

== Courses ==
The college offers bachelor's degree and diploma courses specialising in Tourism Management, Hospitality Management, Hotel Management and Event Management. As part of their mandatory assessment, students of Commercial Cookery and Hospitality Management spend much of their time working in the college’s training restaurant, William Blue Dining.

== Hospitality Industry Connections ==
Part of the college’s niche is strong engagement with the wider hospitality industry, including connections with celebrity chefs such as Ed Halmagyi.

== Notable Graduates ==
- Gwangho “Sid” Choi - Winner of Masterchef Korea Season 3
- Eddie Leung - Owner of award-winning restaurant, 'Spago'
