= Australasian College of Natural Therapies =

Australasian College of Natural Therapies at Torrens University Australia
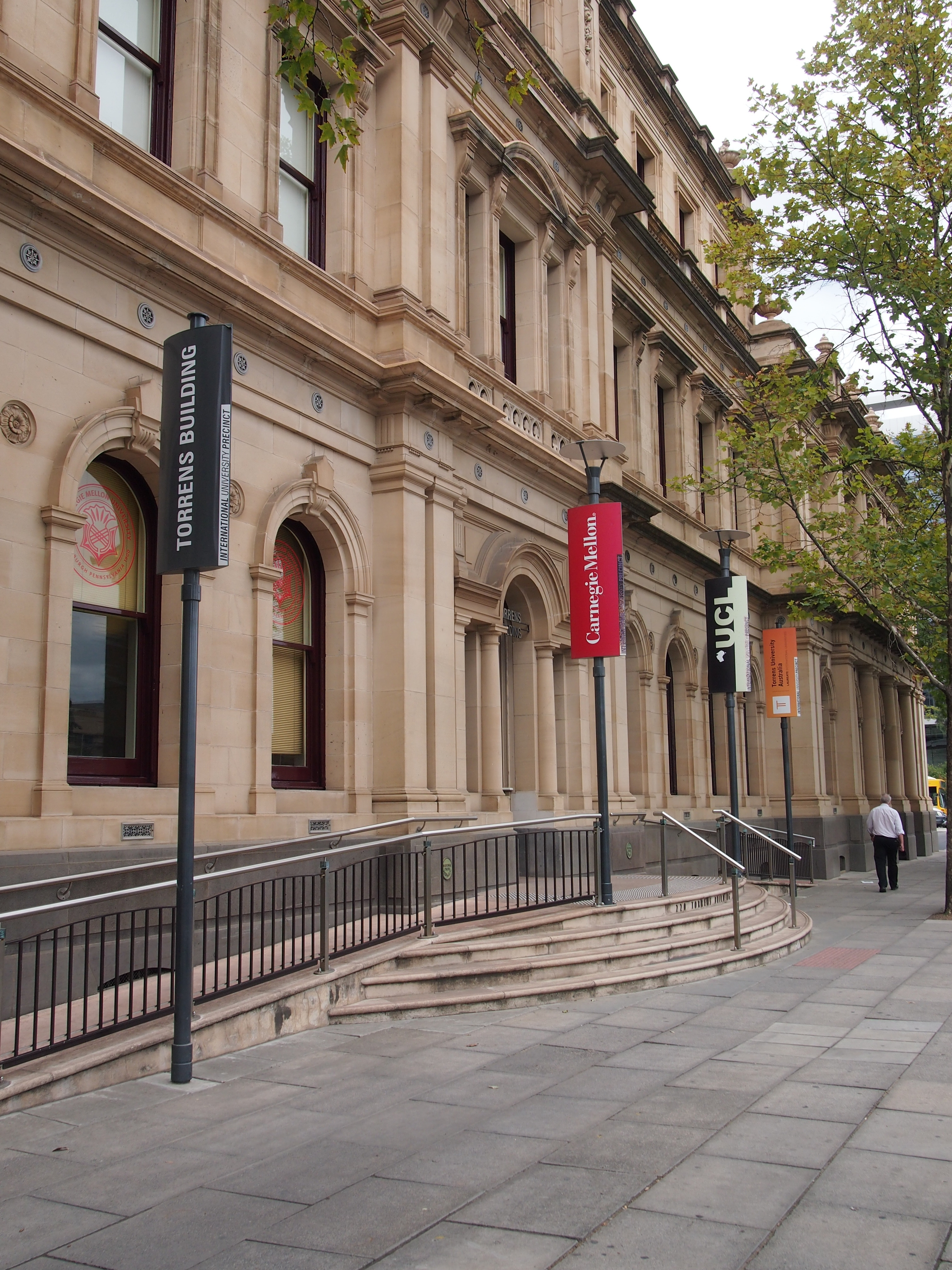
- The historic Torrens Building in Victoria Square, Adelaide
- Motto: Love what you do
- Type: Private
- Established: 1982
- Chancellor: Jim Varghese AM
- Vice-Chancellor: Justin Beilby
- Location: Sydney, Melbourne, Adelaide, Brisbane, Australia
- Campus: Urban
- Website: www.torrens.edu.au/about/our-heritage/acnt
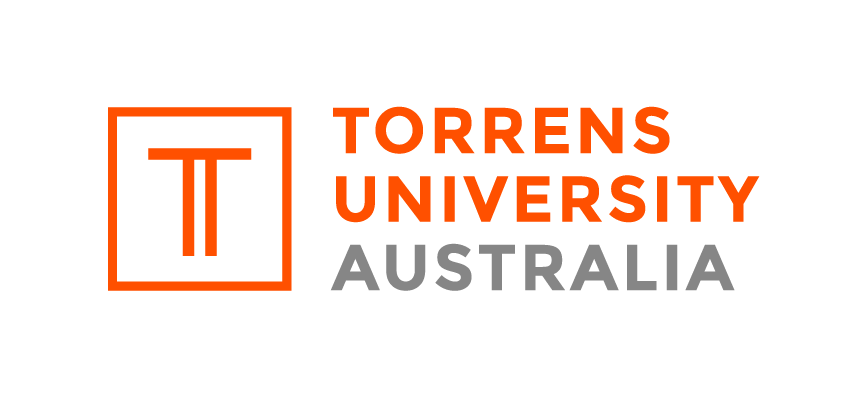

Australasian College of Natural Therapies (ACNT) is an Australian private natural health college that offers both tertiary education and vocational education and training.

The college is a part of an education provider Torrens University Australia, itself part of the Strategic Education, Inc. group.

Other Torrens University colleges include: Billy Blue College of Design, CATC Design School, APM College of Business and Communication, William Blue College of Hospitality Management, Southern School of Natural Therapies, Australian National College of Beauty and Jansen Newman Institute. Together these colleges have in excess of 19,000 students enrolled.

== History ==
Australasian College of Natural Therapies was established in 1982 by Frieda and Peter Bielik (known then as the Eastern Suburbs College of Natural Therapies).

In the 1970s Freida Bielik, Principal and co-founder of Australasian College of Natural Therapies is said to have spent many years of sleepless nights at the local hospital with her son, Danny, who battled severe asthma for many of his early childhood years. Freida and her husband Peter were at a loss as to how to treat their son's health and through word of mouth were referred to an osteopath who had been treating asthma sufferers for many years. This osteopath treated Danny throughout his childhood and the results were astounding.

Today Danny Bielik is no longer a sufferer of asthma and has himself pursued a career in tertiary education including a period as Managing Director/CEO of the college. Danny was also appointed as the Ministerial Adviser for tertiary education to the Minister for Education, The Hon Adrian Piccoli, MP.

Freida was inspired so much by this form of medicine that she went on herself to study osteopathy, chiropractic and naturopathy. Once qualified, Freida started a small practice in Bondi. In 1982, along with her husband Peter, established the Eastern Suburbs College of Natural Therapies modest premises in Bondi Junction. The college then consisted of one classroom and four treatment rooms in an office building near the Bondi Junction train station. Quickly outgrowing the premises, the college moved to Double Bay where Freida and Peter ran a range of successful massage weekend workshops.

Demand for these courses was so high that it was soon necessary to look for larger premises and so the college moved to occupy an entire floor of an office building in Ultimo. After leasing another floor in the same building, then additional space in a building across the street, it was soon time to move again. The building in Bay Street, Broadway seemed huge in comparison to the previous space, with plenty of room for a clinic, dispensary, larger classrooms, a common room and a rooftop terrace. This was soon insufficient space for the college with demand for Australasian College of Natural Therapies courses growing at an astonishing rate.

The Australasian College of Natural Therapies Student Clinic (later known as the Think Wellbeing Centre) then moved to a federation house in Glebe to alleviate the space problems. Space was continually an issue throughout this time and the College ended up moving to its current location, in Foveaux Street, Surry Hills. In 2004 the College added ‘Nourish – Australasian College of Natural Therapies Café and Bookstore' to its campus, helping to nourish the bodies and minds of students and staff.

In 2008, Australasian College of Natural Therapies was acquired by Think Education (then the Think: Education Group).

Australasian College of Natural Therapies became part of Torrens University Australia in 2014.

== Courses ==
ACNT offers bachelor's degree-level courses in Health Science specialising in Naturopathy, Nutritional Medicine and Western Herbal Medicine. Additionally, a Diploma of Health Science, a Diploma of Sport Development as well as programs in Massage for both certificate and diplomas levels are available.

== Industry Recognition ==
- Australian Traditional Medicine Society (ATMS),
- National Herbalists Association of Australia (NHAA)
- International Aromatherapy & Aromatic Medicine Association (IAAMA).

== The Practice Wellbeing Centre ==
The college operates a student-run, public-facing clinic, The Practice Wellbeing Centre, where students are able to practice on paying clients as part of their coursework. Each clinic session is supervised by a qualified and experienced practitioner.

== Campuses ==
The college has two campuses in Sydney (Pyrmont) and Brisbane (Fortitude Valley).

The campus at Pyrmont was opened in 2013 and is shared exclusively with partner college Jansen Newman Institute and the Australian National College of Beauty, while Brisbane is also shared with the Australian National College of Beauty, as well as APM College of Business and Communication, William Blue College of Hospitality Management, Billy Blue College of Design and CATC Design School.
