= List of nursing schools in Australia =

Australia has several different nursing schools. In Australia, a diploma or advanced diploma in nursing along with clinical experience is usually required to work as an enrolled nurse. A bachelor's degree in nursing is typically required to work as a registered nurse. Alternatively, a master's degree (graduate entry) can provide entry into the field as a registered nurse for people with a bachelor's degree in another field. In order to practice as a nurse practitioner, usually a master's degree in the field is required along with three years experience at the advanced nursing practice level. 33 out of 39 members of Universities Australia offer nursing qualifications; the exceptions are the Australian National University, Bond University, Macquarie University, the University of Canberra, the University of New South Wales and the University of Western Australia which do not offer nursing degrees. TAFEs can also offer diplomas and advanced diplomas in nursing.

== Table ==
University nursing schools in Australia
| University | Location(s) | Degree(s) |
|---|---|---|
| Australian Catholic University | Ballarat, Blacktown, Brisbane, Canberra, Melbourne, Sydney and online | BNurs (not online), BNurs (Hons) (not online), GCertClinNurs (online only), GDipClinNurs (online only), MClinNurs (online only), MPhil (not at Blacktown nor online) and PhD (not at Blacktown or online). |
| Central Queensland University | Bundaberg, Cairns, Mackay, Rockhampton, Townsville and online | DipNurs (not online) and BNurs (Rockhampton and online only). |
| Charles Darwin University | Darwin, Sydney and online | BNurs, BNurs (Hons), (Note: Only offered online) GCertNursSt, GDipNurs, MNurs, MNurs(NursPrac), MNursPrac (pre-registration), MRes and PhD. |
| Charles Sturt University | Albury-Wodonga, Bathurst, Dubbo, Port Macquarie, Wagga Wagga and online. | BNurs, GCertNurs, MNurs and PhD. |
| Curtin University | Albany, Kalgoorlie and Perth | BSc(Nurs), MNursPrac (Perth only), and MAdvPrac (has nursing majors). |
| Deakin University | Geelong, Melbourne, Warrnambool and online | BNurs (not online), BNurs (Hons) (not online), GCertAdvNurs, GCertCardNurs, GCertCritCareNurs, GCertEmergNurs, GCertIntCareNurs, GCertIntraNurs, GCertPerianNurs, GCertPeriopNurs, GDipAdvNurs, GDipCardNurs, GDipCritCareNurs, GDipEmergNurs, GDipIntCareNurs, GDipIntraNurs, GDipPerianNurs, GDipPeriopNurs, MAdvClinNurs, MAdvNurs, MNurs (Note: Master's degree by research) and PhD. |
| Edith Cowan University | Perth and online | BSc(Nurs) (Perth only), BSc(NursSt), (Note: Only offered online and only offered to international students) GCertChildYoungPeopleNurs, GDipMentHealthNurs, MClinNurs, MNurs, MNurs(GradEntry) (Perth only), MNurs(NursPrac), MNurs(Res) and PhD. |
| Federation University | Ballarat, Churchill, Horsham, Gippsland, Melbourne, Wonthaggi and online | DipNurs (only Ballarat and Horsham), BNurs, BNurs (Hons) (Ballarat and online only), GCertHealth(AdvNurs), GCertHealth(EmergNurs), GCertHealth(IntCareNurs), GCertHealth(PeriOpNurs), GDipHealth(ChildFamHealthNurs) (Melbourne only), GDipHealth(AdvNurs), MHealth(AdvNurs), MHealth(ChildFamHealthNurs) (Melbourne only), MHealth(MentHealthNurs), MNurs(NursPrac) (Melbourne and Gippsland only) and PhD (Ballarat, Gippsland and Melbourne). |
| Flinders University | Adelaide and online | BNurs, GCertNurs, GDipNurs, MNurs, MNursPrac (online and through placements), MScRes, MHealthClinRes and PhD. |
| Griffith University | Brisbane, Gold Coast and Logan | BNurs, BNurs (Hons), GCertAcuteCareNurs (online), GCertCritCareNurs (online), GCertEmergNurs (online), GCertPaedNurs (online), GCertProfNurs (online) and MAdvNursPrac (online). |
| James Cook University | Cairns, Mackay, Mount Isa and Townsville | DipHealth(NursPath) (only offered in Mackay and Mount Isa), BNursSc (can be done partly online), GDipNurs (online only), MNurs (online only), MPhil (Note: Offered at Cairns, Townsville and online) and PhD. |
| La Trobe University | Albury-Wodonga, Bendigo, Melbourne, Mildura, Shepparton and online | BNurs (not online), GCertRurNursPrac (only at Bendigo), GDipChildFamComNurs (Melbourne only), GDipRurNursPrac (Bendigo only), MMentHealthNurs, MNurs, MNurs(NursPrac), MNurs(Res), MPhil, DNurs and PhD. |
| Monash University | Melbourne | BNurs, BNurs (Hons), MNursPrac, MAdvNurs (online available), MAdvClinNurs, MPhil (online available) and PhD (online available). |
| Murdoch University | Mandurah, Perth and external | BNurs (not external), GCertAdvWounCare (external only), GCertGeronHealth (external only), MHealthCareMngmt(Spec) (not at Mandurah), MPhil and PhD. |
| Queensland University of Technology | Brisbane | UCert(Nurs), BNurs, GCertNurs (online/on campus available), MNursPrac (online only), MNurs (online/on campus available), MNursEntPrac, MPhil (external/on campus) and PhD. |
| RMIT University | Melbourne | DipNurs, BNurs, GDipChildFamHealthNurs, GDipMentHealthNurs and MMentHealthNurs. |
| Southern Cross University | Coffs Harbour, Gold Coast and Lismore | DipHealth(Nurs) (Gold Coast only), UCertNurs, BNurs, GCertMentHealthNurs, GDipMentHealthNurs, MMentHealthNurs, MNurs(GradEntry), MThes and PhD. |
| Swinburne University of Technology | Melbourne | DipNurs (can be studied online), BNurs, GCertForMentHealthNurs and GDipForMentHealthNurs. |
| Torrens University Australia | Adelaide, Brisbane, Melbourne and Sydney | DipNurs and BNurs. |
| University of Adelaide | Adelaide and teaching hospitals | BNurs, MClinNurs, MNursPrac (only at Adelaide), MNursSc, GCertNursSc, GDipNursSc, MClinSci, MPhil and PhD. |
| University of Melbourne | Melbourne and online | GCertCancNurs (online only), GCertCritCareNurs (mixed attendance), GCertPrimCarNurs (mixed attendance), GDipMentHealthNursPrac, MNursSc (entry level into registered nursing, mixed attendance mode), MAdvNursPrac and MAdvNursPrac(NursPrac) (mixed attendance mode). |
| University of Newcastle | Newcastle, Gosford | BNurs, BNurs (Hons), MNursPrac (online only), MNurs (online or Newcastle only) and MMentHealthNurs. |
| University of New England | Armidale and blended (online and on campus) | BNurs. |
| University of Notre Dame Australia | Broome, Fremantle and Sydney | UCertFoundNurs (Fremantle only), DipNurs, BNurs, GCertNurs, GCertClinNurs (external only), GCertContNurs (Fremantle and Sydney only), GDipNurs, GDipClinNurs (external only), GDipPeriNurs, MNurs(ClinNurs), MNurs(Cwork), MNurs(Res) (external study available too) and DNurs (Fremantle and Sydney only). |
| University of Queensland | Brisbane | BNurs, BNurs (Hons), MNursSt, MNursPrac, MPhil and PhD. |
| University of South Australia | Adelaide, Mount Gambier, Whyalla and online | BNurs, GCertNurs, GDipMentHealthNurs, MNurs, MNurs(NursPrac), MRes and PhD. |
| University of Southern Queensland | Ipswich, Toowoomba and external | BNurs, GCertNurs (external and online only), GDipNurs (external and online only), MNurs (external and online only), MRes and PhD. |
| University of Sydney | Sydney | BNurs(AdvSt), BNurs (Hons), MNurs(GradEntry), MAdvNursPrac, MCancHaemNurs, MEmergNurs, MIntCareNurs, MNurs(NursPrac), MPhil and PhD. |
| University of Tasmania | Cradle Coast, Hobart, Launceston, Sydney and online. | BNurs (not online), BNurs (Hons) (not online), GCertNurs, GDipNurs and MClinNurs. |
| University of Technology Sydney | Sydney | BNurs, BNurs (Hons), GCertAcutCareNurs (online), GCertAdvNurs (online), GCertNursEd (online), GDipAdvNurs (online), MAdvNurs (online), MNurs(Res) and PhD (distance learning available). |
| University of the Sunshine Coast | Fraser Coast, Gympie, Moreton Bay and Sunshine Coast | BNursSc, BNursSc (Hons) (not available at Gympie and can be studied online) and MNurs (Sunshine Coast and online only). |
| University of Wollongong | Bega Valley, Eurobodalla, Shoalhaven, Sydney and Wollongong | BNurs, BNurs (Hons), GCertNurs, MNursInt (only at Sydney or Wollongong), MRes, MPhil and PhDI. |
| Victoria University | Melbourne | BNurs, GCertMentHealthNurs, GDipMentHealthNurs, GCertNurs, MMentHealthNurs, MNurs, MAppRes, MRes, MResPrac, PhD and PhD (Int). |
| Western Sydney University | Sydney and online | BNurs, BNurs (Hons) (not online), GCertAcuteCritCareNurs (not online), GCertMentHealthNurs, GCertNurs, GDipMentHealthNurs, GDipNurs, MMentHealthNurs, MNurs, MNurs(ProfSt) (not online) and MNursPrac (preregistration). |
