= Media Design School at Strayer =

Tertiary institution in Auckland, New Zealand

Coordinates: 36.84249°S 174.75688°E

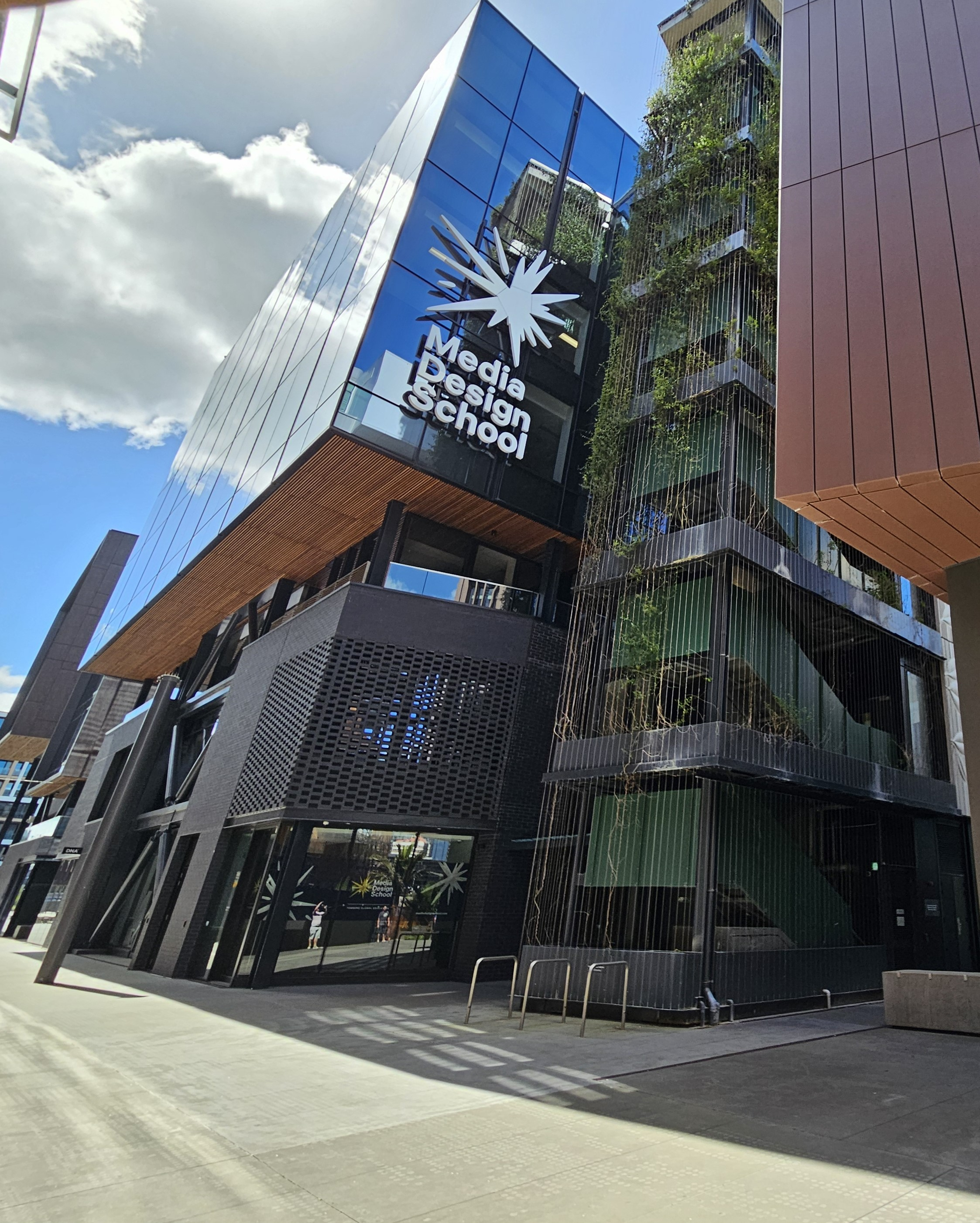
- Media Design School at Strayer campus in Wynyard Quarter, Auckland, New Zealand
- Former name: Media Design School
- Type: Private
- Established: 1998
- Affiliations: Torrens University Australia; Strayer University; Strategic Education Inc.
- Location: Auckland, New Zealand
- Campus: Urban
- Website: mediadesignschool.com

Media Design School at Strayer is a private tertiary institution that provides specialist industry training in 3D animation and visual effects, game art, game programming, graphic and motion design, digital media, artificial intelligence, and creative advertising. The campus is located in central Auckland, New Zealand, and was established in 1998. In 2025 Media Design School joined Strayer.

== History ==
Media Design School was founded in 1998. In 2011, it was sold to Laureate Education for $12.6 million. In November 2020, Laureate sold its Australian and New Zealand operations, including Media Design School, to Strategic Education for US$642.7 million. In 2025, the institute was renamed Media Design School at Strayer.

An international location opened in Atlanta, Georgia, with the first course, a Master of Fine Arts in Screen Scoring & Music Design, being offered from October 2026.
