= Think Education =

Vocational education and training provider in Australia

Think Education is a higher education and vocational education and training provider in Australia, and is the primary trading name of Think Education. It delivers education through several campuses in Sydney, Brisbane, Melbourne and Adelaide, as well as through online study. Think Education is owned by Strategic Education Inc., and was previously owned by Laureate International Universities.

Think Education now only operates in the health discipline, offering two courses: Diploma of Nursing and Bachelor of Health Science (Clinical Myotherapy).

== Accreditation ==
Think Education and its eight colleges are accredited in Australia by the Tertiary Education Quality and Standards Authority (TEQSA) and the Australian Skills Quality Authority (ASQA). Individual courses have specific accreditation from industry associations, especially among its health courses. Think Education as a provider, as well as most of its courses, also have accreditation with the Commonwealth Register of Courses for Overseas Students (CRICOS).

== Awards ==
Think Education won the Australian Council for Private Education and Training (ACPET) award for Higher Education Provider of the Year in 2012.

William Blue College of Hospitality Management training restaurant, William Blue Dining, has won three Restaurant and Catering Association Awards for Excellence.

== Notable Graduates ==
- Gwangho “Sid” Choi - Winner of Masterchef Korea Season 3
- Eddie Leung - Owner of award-winning restaurant, 'Spago'
- Katie Holgate - Winner of the 2014 Southern Cross Packaging Design Award in the Accessibility and Legibility category.
- Stephanie Nguyen - Winner of the 2014 Staron Design Award in the Concept category.
