= APM College of Business and Communication =

Australian private business college

Coordinates: 33.8356°S 151.2077°E

APM College of Business and Communication at Torrens University Australia
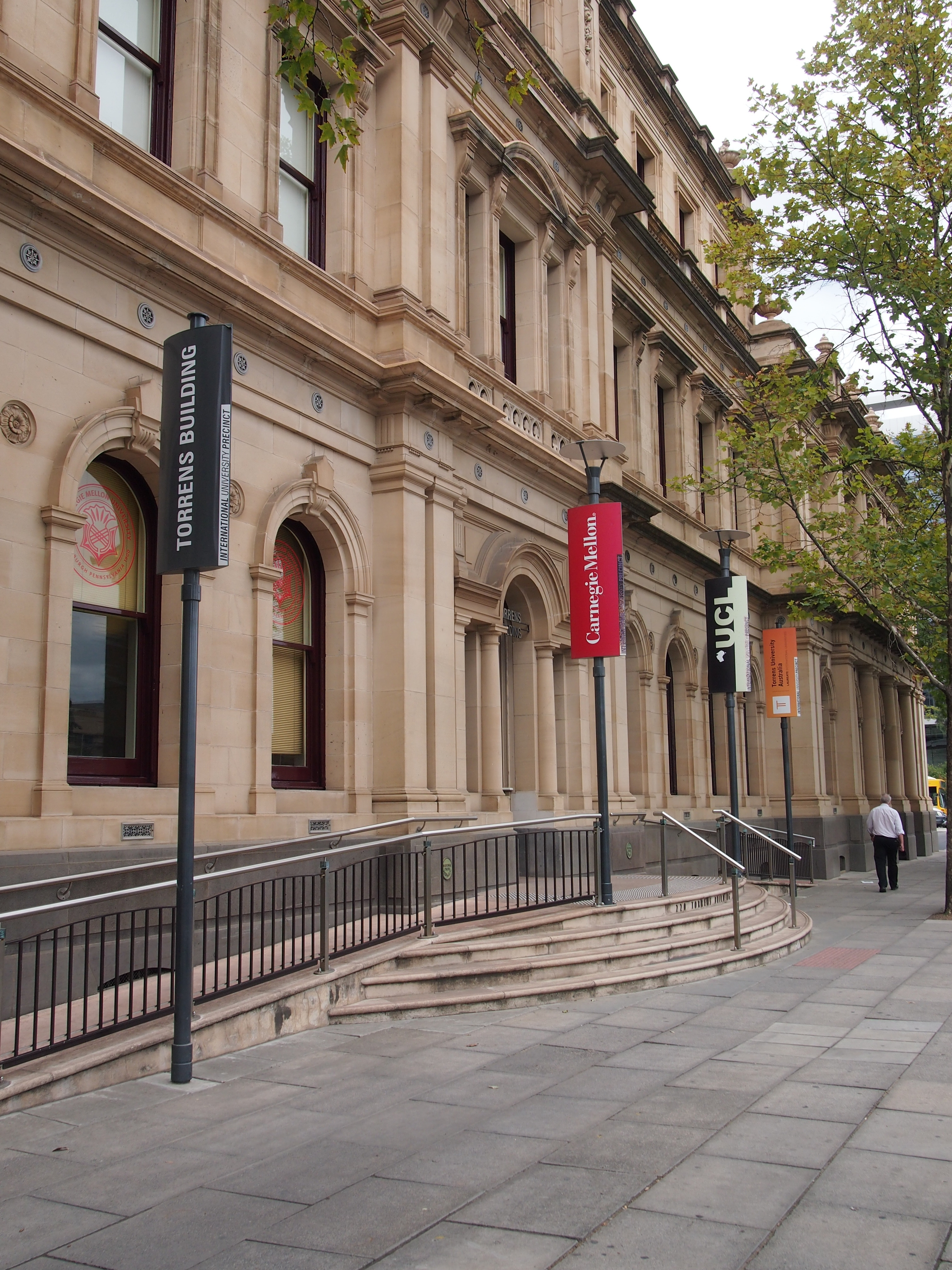
- The historic Torrens Building in Victoria Square, Adelaide
- Motto: Love what you do
- Type: Private
- Established: 1986
- Chancellor: Jim Varghese AM
- Vice-Chancellor: Justin Beilby
- Location: Sydney, Melbourne, Adelaide, Brisbane, Australia
- Campus: Urban
- Website: www.torrens.edu.au/about/our-heritage/apm
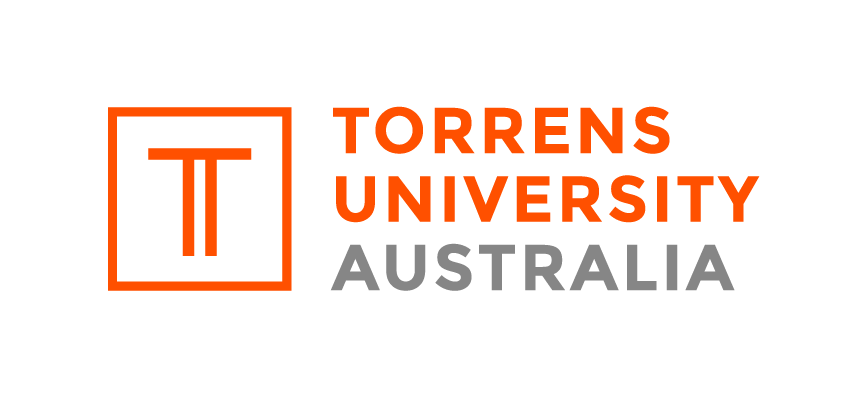

APM College of Business and Communication is an Australian private business college that offers both tertiary education and vocational education and training. The college first opened in 1986 as the APM Training Institute in St Leonards, Sydney.

The college is a part of an education provider Torrens University Australia, itself part of the Strategic Education, Inc. group.

Other Torrens University colleges include: Billy Blue College of Design, CATC Design School, William Blue College of Hospitality Management, Southern School of Natural Therapies, Australian National College of Beauty, Australasian College of Natural Therapies and Jansen Newman Institute. Together these colleges have in excess of 19,000 students enrolled.

== Courses ==
The college offers bachelor's degree and diploma courses specialising in Business Management, Public Relations, Marketing and Event Management. Course are offered on campus and online.
