= James McIlwain =

American ophthalmologist

James T. McIlwain is an American ophthalmologist currently the Sidney A. and Dorothea Doctors Fox Professor Emeritus at Brown University. He obtained his M.D. degree from Tulane University in 1961.
