= Blue Mountains International Hotel Management School =

Private school in Australia

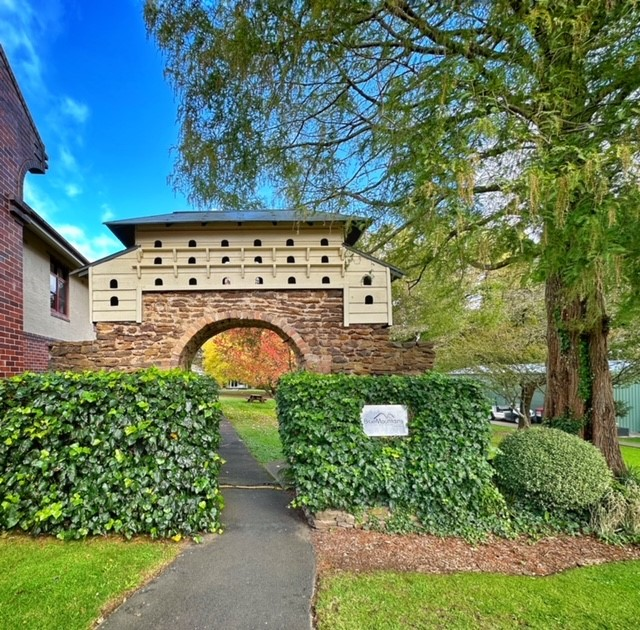
- School campus
- Type: Private, for-profit
- Established: 1991
- Affiliations: Torrens University Australia
- Location: Leura, New South Wales, Australia; 33.72048°S 150.34213°E
- Website: www.torrens.edu.au/blue-mountains-hotel-management-school
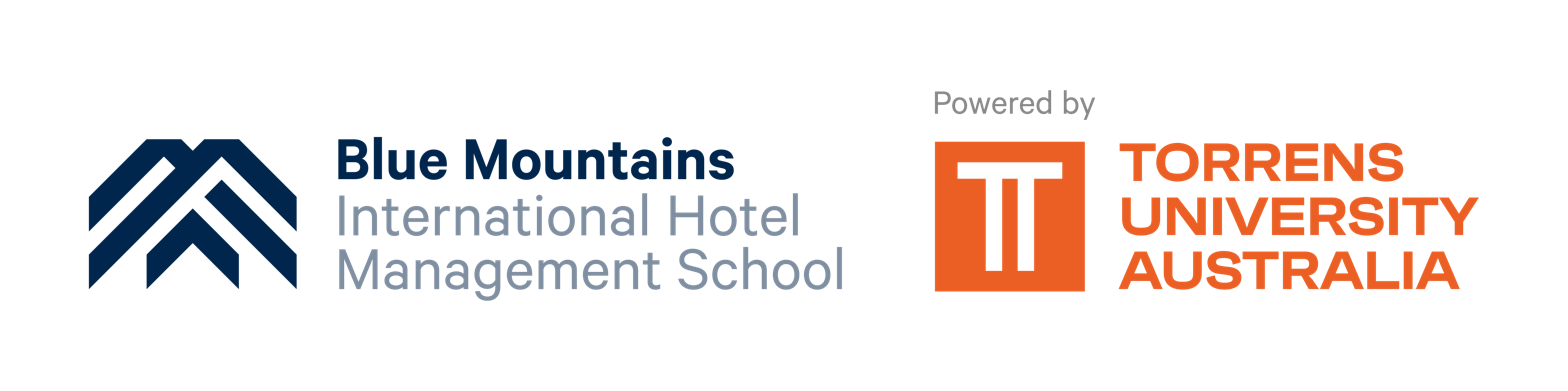

The Blue Mountains International Hotel Management School (BMIHMS) is an Australian hotel management training school affiliated with the private, for-profit Torrens University Australia. The school maintains campuses in Leura, Surry Hills (Sydney), and Melbourne of Australia.

Since 1991, the Blue Mountains International Hotel Management School has provided qualifications in hospitality, event management and tourism management to over 9,000 graduates (as of June 2026).

The school currently delivers the following courses in Hospitality and Tourism:

- Diploma of Business (Hospitality & Tourism Management)
- Associate Degree of Business (Hospitality & Tourism Management)
- Bachelor of Business (Hospitality & Tourism Management)

And the following Hotel Management courses:

- Diploma of Business (International Hotel Management)
- Bachelor of Business International Hotel Management
- Master of International Hotel Management

BMIHMS is now one of the hotel schools within Torrens University Australia.

== History ==
Officially opened by the then NSW Premier, the Hon. Nick Greiner, MP on 13 May 1991, the School was the first in Australia to promote an internationally recognised hotel management program.

Under the guidance of an International Industry Advisory Board, the School developed an educational model in which students live and study in a fully operational simulated hotel environment.

In January 2005, the School also commenced its English Language Program, delivered by specialist teachers on campus for students wishing to improve their language level for entry to the undergraduate programs.

In September 2005, the BMIHMS acquired operation of the Australian International Hotel School, a private university-level provider of hotel management education, located in Canberra, Australia's national capital.

Following a major refurbishment and extension of campus facilities in October 2006, the School announced the commencement of a new strategic partnership with the School of Tourism at The University of Queensland, the only other World Tourism Organization (WTO) accredited educator in Australia. The University of Queensland quality endorses the School's own Bachelor of Business degree that accepted its first intake in 2009.

November 2008 marked the most significant corporate change for the Blue Mountains International Hotel Management School when the privately owned school was bought by Laureate Education Inc, becoming part of a global education network.

The School won the National Award for Tourism Education and Training at the Tourism National Awards held in Hobart Tasmania on 26 February 2010.

Other finalists included Canberra Institute of Technology, Challenger TAFE, Griffith University, University of South Australia, Skycity Darwin, Holmesglen, Eco and Adventure Guide Training.

In September 2011 BMIHMS opened a new campus in downtown Sydney for final year undergraduate and postgraduate students.

The school launched a Master of International Hotel Management degree in January 2012 enhancing the range of courses available.

In 2016, the BMIHMS became a part of Torrens University Australia.

== Campuses ==
Leura: The BMIHMS Leura campus is in the Blue Mountains, 90 km west of Sydney. The Blue Mountains campus is run by students for students as simulated hotel, so students can gain experience in all aspects of hotel management.

The School's teaching facilities include lecture and seminar rooms, computer labs, commercial kitchens, training restaurants, fully operational hotel-style guest services facilities including front desk operations and housekeeping departments.

Sydney: The BMIHMS current Sydney campus is located in Surry Hills. Facilities include lecture theatres, computer labs, student lounges, and an immersive hospitality training space, including a simulated hotel room, front desk operation, and food and beverage service area.

Melbourne: This campus is situated on Flinders Street in Melbourne CBD. Students share this campus with other Torrens University Australia students who are studying business, design and health courses.

== Accreditation ==
BMIHMS holds full national and state accreditation within Australia, including:

- Australian Government Department of Education, Employment and Workplace Relations (national level)
- New South Wales Department of Education and Communities (state level)

Education offered in Australia to international students is highly regulated by the Australian Government Department of Education, Employment and Workplace Relations. BMIHMS is on the National Register of higher education providers and the accreditation process ensures that courses are equivalent to a qualification of that level in a similar field in other Australian higher education institutions, including universities.

BMIHMS is also accredited with the following:

- Institute of Hospitality

BMIHMS has attained accreditation for its programs from the Institute of Hospitality, the only internationally recognised professional management association for managers in hospitality, leisure and tourism.

- The International Centre of Excellence in Tourism & Hospitality Education

BMIHMS is a member of The International Centre of Excellence in Tourism & Hospitality Education (THE-ICE), which is an independent international accreditation body that specialises in tourism, hospitality, culinary arts and events education.

== Rankings ==
- Ranked #1 in Australia and Oceania, #21 Globally (QS World University Rankings 2026).
- 99% employed within 12 months (Kantar 2024–2025)
- 96% within 6 months (Kantar 2024–2025)
- 9 in 10 work in their field (Kantar 2024–2025)
- 50% reach management in 5 years (Kantar 2024–2025)
- Ranked #1 Hotel Management School in Australia and Asia Pacific (Kantar 2020).
- Ranked #1 in Australia by subject – Hospitality and Leisure Management (QS World University 2019).
