= Zach McIlwain =

American congressional advisor

Personal details
- Born: Zachary Paul McIlwain; June 6, 1986 Muncie, Indiana
- Died: December 9, 2024 (aged 38) Indianapolis, Indiana
- Party: Republican
- Education: Ball State University
- Awards: Army Commendation Medal (V-Device & 3 Oak Leaf Clusters); Army Achievement Medal (3 Oak Leaf Clusters); Army Good Conduct Medal (2); Iraq Campaign Medal (4 Campaign Stars); National Defense Service Medal; Armed Forces Expeditionary Medal; Army Overseas Service Ribbon (4); Combat Infantryman Badge

Military service
- Allegiance: United States
- Branch/service: United States Army
- Years of service: 2005–2013
- Rank: Staff Sergeant
- Unit: 2-1 Infantry 172nd SBCT / 1-24 Infantry 1-25 SBCT "Deuce Four"

Zachary Paul McIlwain (June 6, 1986 – December 9, 2024) was a National Veteran Advocate, Congressional Advisor, and veteran of the United States Army and the Iraq War. McIlwain made multiple appearances on national television and other national media sources as an advocate trying to raise awareness on the issues currently facing veterans. He worked with Iraq and Afghanistan Veterans of America (IAVA), members of Congress, and other veteran and military service organizations focused on military and veteran affairs.

== Life and work ==
McIlwain was born in Muncie, Indiana. He attended Delta High School in Muncie, Indiana. Following graduation in 2004, McIlwain attended Ball State University before enlisting in the United States Army in 2005.

As an infantryman, McIlwain was deployed to Iraq with the 172nd Stryker Brigade Combat Team (SBCT) in 2005–2006. McIlwain was awarded the Army Commendation Medal with Valor Device as well as the Combat Infantry Badge. McIlwain's unit's focus during that deployment was "quelling Sectarian violence in Baghdad through diplomacy, direct action, and target acquisition missions." McIlwain was deployed again to Iraq with Deuce Four in 2008–2009. McIlwain left Active Duty to pursue his education, and finished his service in 2013 as an Infantry Platoon Sergeant holding the rank of Staff Sergeant.

According to McIlwain, when he left the military, he nearly became a "casualty of the war on veteran suicide." He credited his wife, Kristin, and IAVA with his life-changing transformation. Upon seeking and receiving help, he went on to become a strong advocate for veterans in the national arena. He also completed his Bachelor of Science in Economics at Ball State University with Cum Laude Honors. McIlwain utilized his own stories and struggles as a way to reach and touch the lives of veterans.

Through his work with IAVA, McIlwain was featured on national television, news media, and news print focused on bringing awareness to issues currently facing veterans. He appeared in the Military Times and on CNN, Comedy Central, and MSNBC. As of 2022, McIlwain was a Leadership Fellow and Spokesperson for IAVA, a Sitting Member of the Indiana Military Coalition, a Congressional Advisor on military and veteran affairs, a Financial Institution Specialist for the Federal Deposit Insurance Corporation, and sat on various nonprofit boards to include an animal rescue partnered with Pets for Patriots.

=== Personal life and death ===
McIlwain married Kristin in 2012. They subsequently divorced in early 2024.

McIlwain died on December 9, 2024. On August 20, 2025, IAVA renamed their Leadership Fellowship to the Zach McIlwain Leadership Fellowship in his honor.
