= Université Internationale de Casablanca =

L'Université Internationale de Casablanca
- Established: September 2010; 15 years ago
- Location: Casablanca, Morocco
- Website: www.uic.ac.ma

Université Internationale de Casablanca (International University of Casablanca) is a licensed private university in Casablanca, Morocco, which opened in September 2010.
