= Serena McIlwain =

American government official

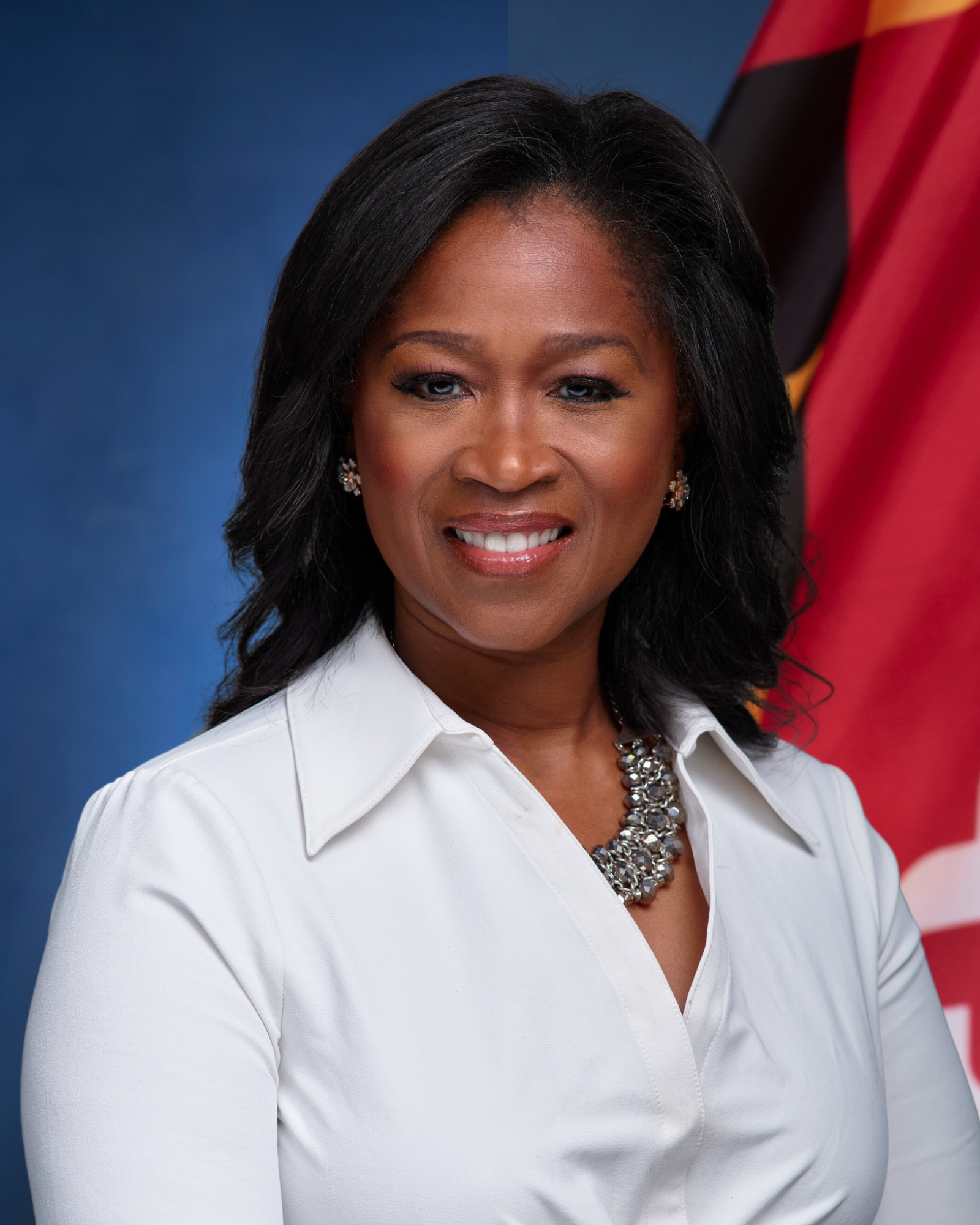
- McIlwain in 2023

Secretary of the Maryland Department of the Environment
- Incumbent
- Assumed office March 2, 2023; Acting: January 18, 2023 – March 2, 2023
- Appointed by: Wes Moore
- Preceded by: Ben Grumbles

Undersecretary of the California Environmental Protection Agency
- In office March 25, 2019 – January 2023
- Appointed by: Gavin Newsom

Personal details
- Born: 1968 or 1969 (age 57–58) Alexandria, Virginia, U.S.
- Party: Democratic
- Children: 2
- Education: Strayer University (B.A.); Central Michigan University (M.S.); George Mason University (M.P.A.)

Serena Coleman McIlwain (born 1968 or 1969) is an American government official who has served as the secretary of the Maryland Department of the Environment since March 2023. She previously served as the undersecretary of the California Environmental Protection Agency from 2019 to 2023. McIlwain is the first Black secretary of the Environment in Maryland history and the third woman confirmed to the position.

== Early life and education ==
McIlwain was born 1968 or 1969 in Alexandria, Virginia, and attended T.C. Williams High School.

McIlwain attended Strayer University from 1988 to 1994, earning a B.A. in Business Administration. She subsequently attended Central Michigan University from 1997 to 1999, where she obtained a Master of Science in Administration with a focus on human resources and international studies. From 2001 to 2003, McIlwain attended the Schar School of Policy and Government at George Mason University, earning a Master of Public Administration.

== Career ==
=== Federal government ===
McIlwain began her career in the U.S. federal government at age 19 as a program analyst at the National Institutes of Health. She originally envisioned a career in business but became interested in environmental protection after researching the impact of agricultural practices and greenhouse gases. This led her to make personal lifestyle changes, such as reducing her meat consumption, and to pursue a career at the U.S. Environmental Protection Agency (EPA).

From 2003 to 2009, she served as the director of Workforce Planning and Management at the Architect of the Capitol. In 2009, McIlwain joined the U.S. Department of Energy (DOE) as the director of the Business Partners Office, serving as the agency's Chief Human Capital Officer until June 2011. She later served as the deputy assistant secretary and chief operating officer of the Office of Fossil Energy at the DOE from 2011 to 2014.

In 2014, McIlwain moved to the EPA, where she served as the assistant regional administrator and chief operating officer for Region 9 in San Francisco until 2017. Following this role, she returned to Washington, D.C., to serve as the EPA's director of the Office of Continuous Improvement and chief performance improvement officer from October 2017 to April 2019.

=== California Environmental Protection Agency ===
On March 25, 2019, California governor Gavin Newsom appointed McIlwain as the undersecretary of the California Environmental Protection Agency (CalEPA). In this capacity, she also served as the agency's chief operations officer. The position did not require State Senate confirmation.

During her tenure at CalEPA, McIlwain focused on reforming administrative processes and combining resources across departments, stating that these efforts saved the agency several million dollars. She described her management philosophy as setting a vision while providing autonomy to senior executives rather than micromanaging. She held this role until January 2023.

=== Maryland Department of the Environment ===
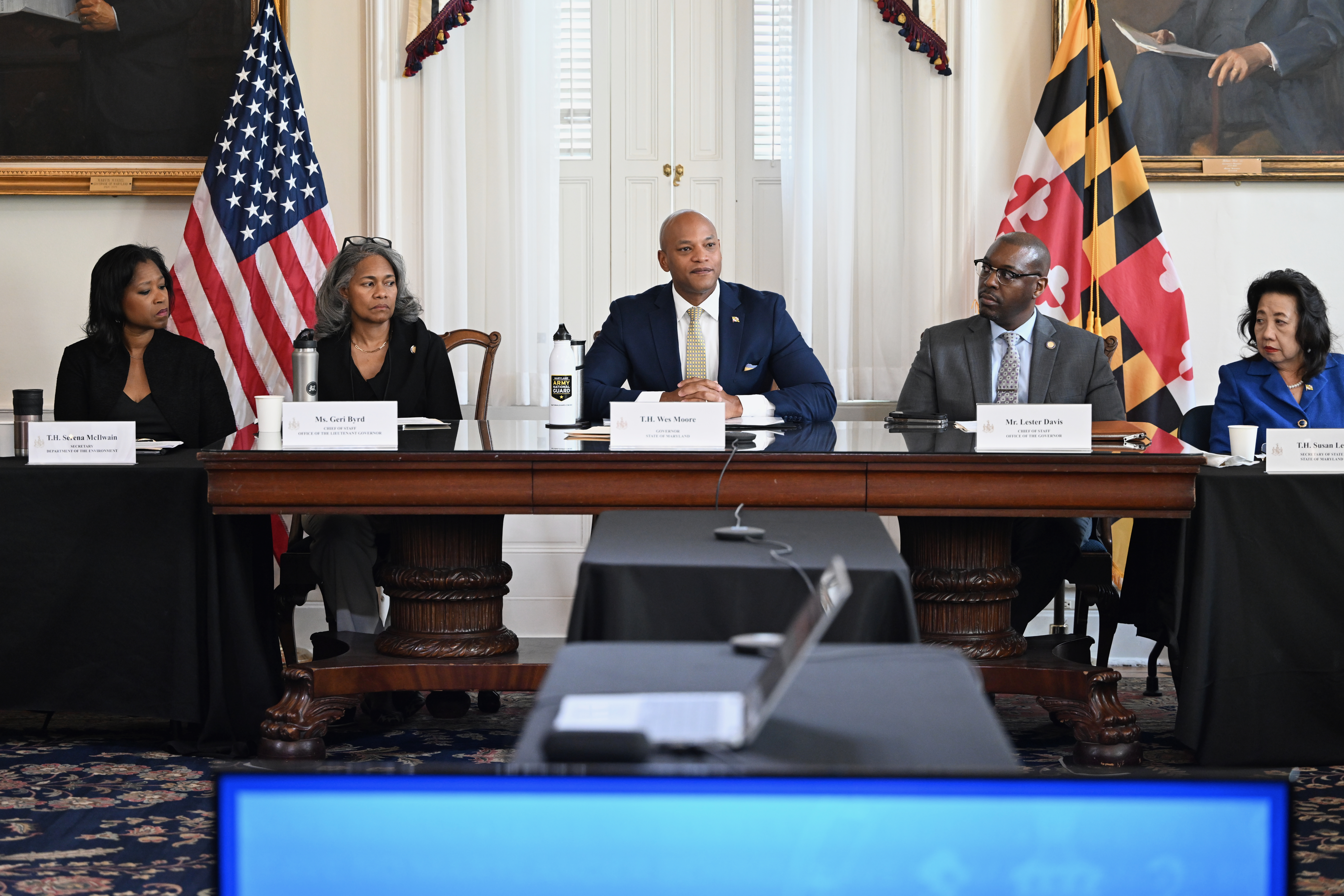
McIlwain at a meeting of Governor Wes Moore's cabinet, 2026

In January 2023, McIlwain returned to Maryland to join the administration of Governor Wes Moore. She served as acting secretary of the Maryland Department of the Environment (MDE) from January 18 to March 2, 2023. She was confirmed as the secretary of the Environment on March 2, 2023. With this appointment, McIlwain became the first Black secretary of the Environment in Maryland and the third woman to be confirmed for the role. McIlwain stated she was motivated to accept the position after realizing that the goals in Maryland's Climate Solutions Now Act were "more aggressive than California."

Upon taking office, McIlwain inherited an agency she described as "hobbled" by a shrinking workforce and legal disputes. She prioritized clearing the agency's backlog of expired stormwater discharge and septic permits, emphasizing a "five-star customer service" approach to regulation. To address environmental justice concerns, she initiated listening sessions in communities such as Curtis Bay, Baltimore, where residents expressed concerns about coal dust and industrial pollution. She oversaw the reconsideration process for the Conowingo Dam operating license following a 2022 court ruling that nullified a previous settlement.

As Secretary, McIlwain serves as a member of the governor's Executive Council and the governor's Council on the Chesapeake Bay. Since 2024, she has chaired the governor's Subcabinet on Climate. Since 2023, she has also been a member of the Public Policy Board for Veloz.

In November 2026, after Moore won re-election to a second term, McIlwain announced that she would resign as secretary of the Maryland Department of the Environment at the end of the year. Deputy secretary Adam Ortiz will succeed Moore on January 1 as the acting secretary.

== Personal life ==
McIlwain is a Democrat. She has two children. She resided in Sacramento, California, in 2019 following her appointment to CalEPA. Outside of her time in California, she has been a lifetime resident of the Washington, D.C. area. McIlwain raised her children in Prince George's County, Maryland.
