= Maryland Department of the Environment =

Government agency in the state of Maryland, U.S.

Agency overview
- Formed: 1987
- Headquarters: Baltimore, Maryland, USA
- Agency executives: Serena McIlwain, Secretary of Environment; Suzanne E. Dorsey, Deputy Secretary of Environment
- Website: https://mde.maryland.gov/Pages/index.aspx

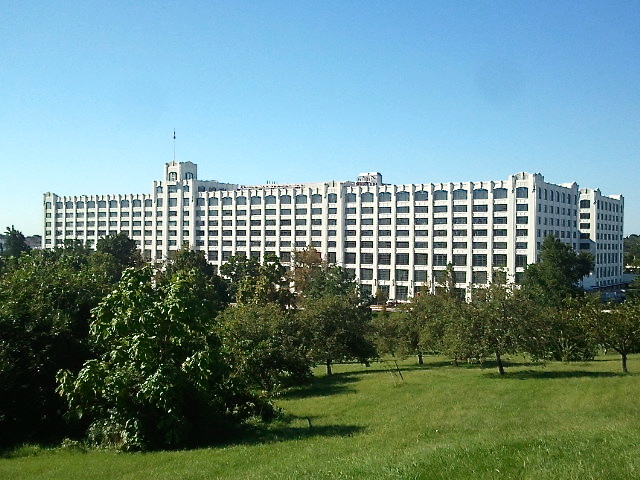
MDE offices in Baltimore

The Maryland Department of the Environment (MDE) is a government agency in the state of Maryland that implements and enforces environmental protection laws and programs. The agency's stated vision is "Healthy, vibrant and sustainable communities and ecosystems in Maryland." Its headquarters are in Baltimore, Maryland.

== Department responsibilities ==
The department's principal functions are:

- Enforcement of environmental laws and regulations, both state and federal. Its several divisions issue pollution control permits, oversee public water systems, supervise cleanup of waste sites and remediation, and provide financial assistance to communities for environmental infrastructure improvements.
- Long-term planning and research.
- Technical assistance to businesses and communities throughout the state in the areas of pollution control and prevention, urbanization and growth, and environmental emergencies.

== Organization ==
The Maryland Department of the Environment was created in 1987 by the Maryland General Assembly, which consolidated environmental regulatory and planning programs from several predecessor agencies.

Serena McIlwain was appointed Secretary of the Environment by Governor Wes Moore in 2023.

The department includes five principal divisions:

- Air and Radiation Administration
- Land and Materials Administration
- Water and Science Administration
- Office of Budget and Infrastructure Financing
- Operational Services Administration.

== See also ==
- Maryland Department of Natural Resources
