= DevMountain =

- Dallas, Texas; Lehi, Utah; Phoenix, Arizona

Information
- Type: Private
- Motto: Learn Live Build Give
- Established: 2013
- Founders: Cahlan Sharp, Tyler Richards, and Colt Henrie
- Faculty: 70+
- Classes offered: Web Development, UX/UI Design, iOS Development, Software QA Testing, Salesforce Development
- Graduates: 2000+
- Website: devmountain.com

DevMountain is a private coding bootcamp school that offers both in-person and online courses ranging from 6 to 26 weeks in a variety of subjects including web development, mobile programming, user experience design, software quality assurance, and salesforce development. The school was founded in Provo, Utah by Cahlan Sharp, Tyler Richards, and Colt Henrie in 2013.

In April 2016, DevMountain was acquired by Capella Education Company for $20 million.
