= Torrens University Australia =

Private university in Australia

Coordinates: 34°55′42″S 138°36′14″E

- Motto: Love what you do
- Type: Private university
- Established: 2013; 13 years ago
- Accreditation: TEQSA
- Chancellor: Michael Thawley
- President: Dan Cockerell
- Vice-Chancellor: Alwyn Louw
- Total staff: 1,914 (2022)
- Students: c. 19,600 (2022)
- Location: Australia, New Zealand and China
- Campus: Urban and regional with multiple sites
- Named after: Robert Richard Torrens
- Headquarters: Sydney, New South Wales, Australia
- Colours: Orange Grey
- Sporting affiliations: UniSport; EAEN
- Website: torrens.edu.au
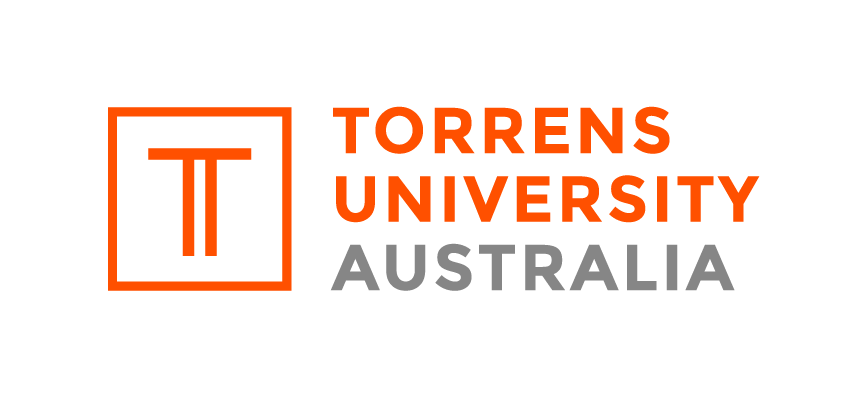

Torrens University is an Australian international private, for-profit university and vocational registered training organisation, with campuses in Sydney, Melbourne, Brisbane, Adelaide, Blue Mountains, and Auckland, New Zealand.

Torrens University Australia, along with Think Education and Media Design School, together form Torrens Global Education, which is part of Strategic Education, Inc.

== History ==
An application from Laureate Education Asia to found a private university was approved by the Government of South Australia in October 2011. Upon commission, Torrens University became the 33rd university in Australia and the first new university for 20 years.

The go-ahead for the new university was given by the South Australian Cabinet following Premier Mike Rann's negotiations in Australia and in Cancun, Mexico, with Laureate chairman Douglas Becker and Chancellor Michael Mann. Honorary Laureate Chancellor and former US President Bill Clinton publicly endorsed the Australian project.

The founding President and Vice-chancellor was Fred McDougall, former deputy vice-chancellor and vice-president of the University of Adelaide.

Torrens University Australia was accredited by the Tertiary Education Quality and Standards Agency in 2012. It was originally expected to open in 2013 but commenced teaching in 2014. In September 2019, Torrens University was reaccredited by TEQSA for 5 years until September 2024.

In 2020 Strategic Education, Inc. became the new owner of Torrens University Australia. This new alliance created a global network of over 100,000 learners around the world.

== Campuses and buildings ==
As of 2021, Torrens University has campuses in and around five cities in Australia and one in New Zealand.

=== Adelaide CBD Campus ===
Torrens University Australia campus in Adelaide, May 2026

Adelaide was the first location in the country, opening its first campus in the heritage-listed Torrens Building on Victoria Square/Tarndanyangga, in the CBD, in 2013.

On 3 August 2015, the university opened a new campus just along the road in the old Menz Biscuits factory on Wakefield Street, and as of 2019 no longer lists Torrens Building as another campus. There was another campus in Adelaide on Pulteney Street. This campus was the Blue Mountains International Hotel Management School hub in the centre of Adelaide's CBD, exclusively focused on students studying a Master of International Hotel Management. This campus closed in 2025 and all Adelaide students are now studying at the Wakefield St campus.

=== Brisbane City Campus ===
The Fortitude Valley campus is adjacent to the Story Bridge and home to a range of courses and degrees in Design and Creative Technology, Health & Education, and Business & Hospitality, along with the Torrens University Language Centre.

=== Melbourne CBD Campus ===
Melbourne plays host to a campus located on Melbourne's Flinders Street. The Practice Wellbeing Centre, once based in Fitzroy, moved in to the Flinders St campus in 2025.

=== Sydney City and Blue Mountains ===
There are two campuses in the Sydney region. These campuses include the Surry Hills and the Blue Mountains campus on the outskirts of metropolitan Sydney. The Blue Mountains campus is located in the suburb of Leura, adjacent to Katoomba. The campus is home to Torrens University's Practical Learning Centre, simulated hotel environment where students learn hotel management as part of their practical development. The Ultimo campus has merged with Surry Hills Campus, bringing the home for Design & Creative Technology students to Surry Hills. The Surry Hills Campus continues to be home to students from all other faculties, as well as the Torrens University Language Centre, located just minutes away from Sydney's Central Train Station.

=== Auckland, New Zealand ===
Media Design School offers a range of courses in design and creative technology.

== Governance and structure ==
=== Chancellor and Vice-Chancellor ===
==== Vice-chancellors ====
- Professor Aleks Subic (2026-present) – also Chief Executive Officer
- Alwyn Louw (2020–2026)
- Justin Beilby (2015–2019)
- Fred McDougall (2012–2015)

==== Chancellors ====
- Michael Thawley AO (2025–present)
- Jim Varghese AM (2022–2025)
- Michael Mann AM (2012–2021)

==== President ====
- Dan Cockerell (2025–2026)
- Linda Brown (2014–2024)

=== Constituent schools ===
- APM College of Business and Communication – APM was established over 25 years ago and offers business degrees and vocational diplomas, and the opportunity to pathway into a master's degree.
- Australasian College of Natural Therapies (ACNT) – a natural health college that offers courses in Health Science specialising in Naturopathy, Nutritional Medicine and Western Herbal Medicine.
- Australian Natural College of Beauty (ANCB) – ACNB was a natural therapy college for beauty therapy, and part of Torrens University Australia since 2009.
- Billy Blue College of Design – Billy Blue College was created by designers for designers, offering appropriate courses for aspiring design professionals. The college started off as a magazine and later moved into a design agency. It then went on to develop into a school and now finally, a university.
- Blue Mountains International Hotel Management School (or BMIHMS) – was opened in 1991 and focuses on hotel management education. It is number 1 in Oceania by subject 2019 according to QS World University Rankings Hospitality and Leisure Management, and number 1 Hotel Management School in Australia and Asia-Pacific's in 2020 according to Kantar.
- Chifley Business School – For over two decades, Chifley has provided business education across Australia and internationally through a range of postgraduate courses for those looking to pursue careers in resources, engineering, and information technology.
- Jansen Newman Institute – offers courses in counselling, psychotherapy and community services.
- Media Design School – Media Design School was founded to provide trained graduates for digital and technological companies.
- Southern School of Natural Therapies – one of the longest standing Natural Therapies schools in Australia. The college offers Naturopathy, Nutritional Medicine, Clinical Myotherapy, Western Herbal Medicine and Chinese Medicine.
- Torrens University Language Centre (TULC) – The Torrens University Language Centre has been delivering English language programs in Australia for more than 20 years. Founded in 1995, the centre offers academic and general English courses to students from around the world.
- William Blue College of Hospitality Management – private hospitality college offering bachelor's degrees, associate degrees and diploma courses that specialise in tourism and hospitality management including work placement with industry partners.

== Academic profile ==
=== Research divisions ===
- The Centre of Artificial Intelligence Research and Optimisation (AIRO) focuses on research in two areas of science: Artificial Intelligence and Optimisation.
- The Centre for Organisational Change and Agility (COCA) spans research topics from accounting, finance, global project management, global supply and value, leadership, business systems, commercial services, tourism, strategy, management and organisational behaviour.
- AXIS Research Health Institute brings together public health, clinical sciences, mechanistic discovery, health systems research and translational innovation under the one research centre.
- Public Health Information Development Unit (PHIDU) – Since its establishment with funding from the Australian Government in 1999, the PHIDU has been committed to providing information on a broad range of health and other determinants across the lifespan. Located at Torrens University Australia since November 2015, the emphasis continues to be on the publication of small area statistics. Since 2008, PHIDU has offered free online access to a range of data for researchers to reference.

=== Other initiatives ===
On 2 April 2018, Torrens University Australia launched a free online course called "the Voices of Autism" to celebrate World Autism Awareness Day.

In July 2021, Torrens University Australia launched another free online course, the Thin Ice VR short course. Co-designed by environmental scientist Tim Jarvis AM and lecturer James Calvert, it goes behind the scenes of the "Thin Ice" virtual reality production to teach about the creative technologies used to recreate Antarctic locations in realistic 3D. In 2022, Thin Ice VR won several awards, including Best Virtual Reality Short at the Cannes World Film Festival.

On 25 January 2022, Torrens University Australia launched a 9-part podcast series featuring researchers from Torrens University, who are working towards solving complex global problems and propelling innovation. The podcast was recorded across Australia and New Zealand.

=== Academic reputation ===
National publications

In the Australian Financial Review Best Universities Ranking 2025, the university was ranked #40 out of 40 Australian universities.

=== Student outcomes ===
The Australian Government's QILT (Note: Abbreviation for Quality Indicators for Learning and Teaching.) conducts national surveys documenting the student life cycle from enrolment through to employment.

In the 2023 Employer Satisfaction Survey, graduates of the university had an overall employer satisfaction rate of 80.7%.

In the 2023 Graduate Outcomes Survey, graduates of the university had a full-time employment rate of 68% for undergraduates and 81.4% for postgraduates. The initial full-time salary was A$62,600 for undergraduates and A$100,000 for postgraduates.

In the 2023 Student Experience Survey, undergraduates at the university rated the quality of their entire educational experience at 79.4% meanwhile postgraduates rated their overall education experience at 78%.

- Ranked top 10 in teaching quality and education experience in QILT's 2023 Student Experience Survey.
- Global Online MBA Rankings (CEO Magazine) Tier One status from 2021-2024.
- Recognised as one of Australia's Most Innovative Companies three years in a row (2020 and 2021) (AFR).
- BMIHMS in Suzhou named the Most Respected Hotel School of China in 2021.
- Ranked 2nd in overall employment for undergraduate international graduates in Australia.
- Ranked 4th in full time employment for undergraduate international graduates.
- Postgraduates earn a salary within the top 20% in Australia.
- Media Design School ranked No. 1 in New Zealand and No. 2 in Australasia, with Billy Blue at No. 7 in Animation Career Review's 2020 Global College Ranking.
- Media Design School ranked No. 1 Creative Tech School in the Southern Hemisphere – The Rookies 2021
- Ranked in of the Top 12 Animation School in the world – Animation Career Review 2021

==== Other awards ====
- 2022 ASCILITE Award for Innovation – virtual design studio
- Professor Seyedali Mirjalili named The Australian Research 2023 Magazine's number 1 artificial intelligence researcher in the world
- 2022 Catalyst Award in the Teaching and Learning category – virtual design studio
- Linda Brown, Torrens University CEO and President | EY Entrepreneur of the Year™ Australia 2021
- MBA ranked by CEO Magazine as a Tier 1 MBA for 4 years in a row (2022)

== Student life ==
=== Student demographics ===
There are about 20,000 enrolled students.

== Notable people ==
=== Notable alumni ===
- Golgol Mebrahtu, professional footballer
- Alex Wilkinson, professional footballer
- Jonathon Giles, professional AFL player
- Oscar McInerney, professional AFL player
- Paul Seedsman, professional AFL player
- Daniel Menzel, professional AFL player
- Mackenzie Arnold, professional soccer player
- Caitlin Foord, Arsenal soccer player
- Reilly O'Brien, professional AFL player
- Leah Kaslar, professional AFL player

=== Academics and staff ===
- Darren Peters
- Victoria Pendergast
- Craig Foster
- Stephanie Kelton
- Sedeyali Mirjalili
- Andy Blood

== See also ==
- List of universities in Australia
