= Jansen Newman Institute =

Australian private university

Jansen Newman Institute at Torrens University Australia
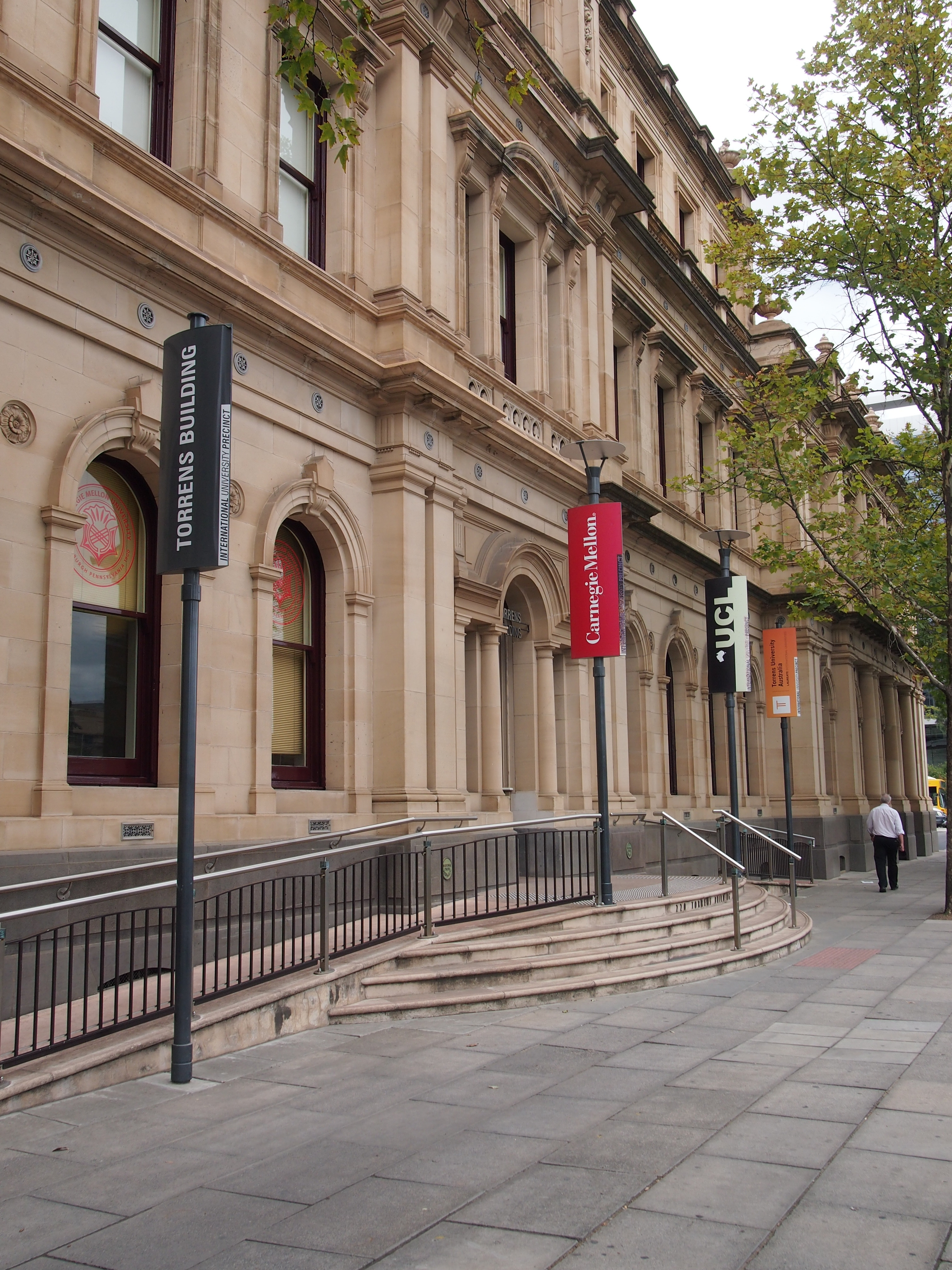
- The historic Torrens Building in Victoria Square, Adelaide
- Motto: Love what you do
- Type: Private
- Established: 1978
- Chancellor: Jim Varghese AM
- Vice-Chancellor: Justin Beilby
- Location: Sydney, Melbourne, Adelaide, Brisbane, Australia
- Campus: Urban
- Website: www.torrens.edu.au/about/our-heritage/jni
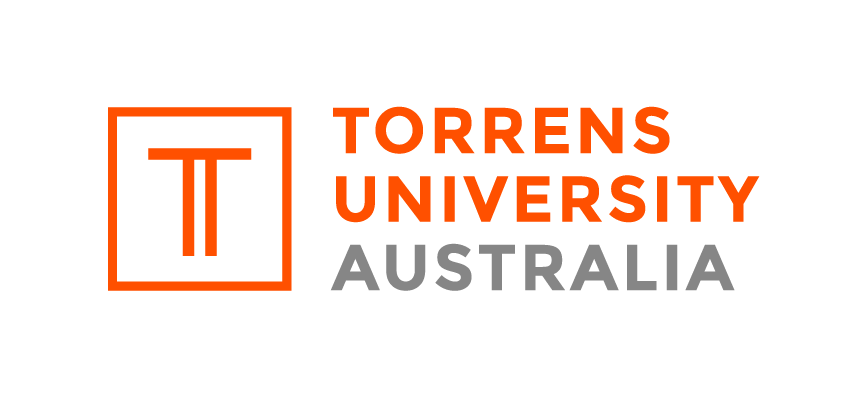

Jansen Newman Institute was an Australian private college that offered tertiary education and vocational education and training in counselling, psychotherapy and community services.

The business and the name were bought by Torrens University in 2008, an educational brand owned by Strategic Education, Inc.

== History ==
The Institute was established in 1978 by David Jansen and was originally named the "Relationship Development Centre". In 1981, psychologist Margaret Newman joined David Jansen and the name was changed to the Jansen Newman Institute. In 1994, the Institute became one of Sydney's first private higher education providers, with the accreditation of a diploma and graduate diploma. The accreditation of the Bachelor of Counselling and Human Change (BCHC) course came for the college in 2000 with the Graduate Diploma in Counselling and Psychotherapy (GDCP) course following in 2001.

In August 2006, the Institute became an approved Higher Education Provider (HEP) under the government's Higher Education Support Act 2003. Approval as a Higher Education Provider enabled eligible students to receive FEE-HELP, a government loan to assist students with payment of their tuition fees.

In 2008, the institute was purchased by what was then known as the Think: Education Group (now Think Education). This led to further growth in the college and in 2008 the Institute launched the Bachelor of Applied Social Science (BASS) course offering courses both on campus at St Leonards and also online with specialisation streams in counselling, community services and human resource management. In 2011, the Institute launched its Masters in Counselling and Applied Psychotherapy program.

In 2013, Jansen Newman Institute moved to Pyrmont, Sydney and has now been subsumed by Torrens University.

== Courses ==
The Institute offered vocational and undergraduate qualifications in Applied Social Science specialising in Counselling or Community services, as well as postgraduate qualifications including a Master of Counselling and Applied Psychotherapy with two nested graduate qualifications.

== The Practice Wellbeing Centre ==
As part of their coursework, students were required to practice in the college's on-campus wellbeing clinic with paying public customers.
