= Strategic Education, Inc. =

American education services holding company

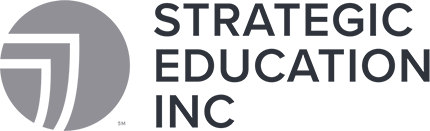
- Type: Public
- Traded as: Nasdaq: STRA; S&P 600 component
- Industry: Education
- Headquarters: Herndon, Virginia, U.S.
- Key people: Robert S. Silberman (executive chairman); Karl McDonnell (CEO); Daniel W. Jackson (CFO)
- Services: Online education
- Revenue: ▲US$ 1,027,700,000 (2020)
- Operating income: ▼US$ 94,400,000 (2020)
- Net income: ▼US$ 39,300,000 (2020)
- Number of employees: 3,076 (2019)
- Website: strategiceducation.com

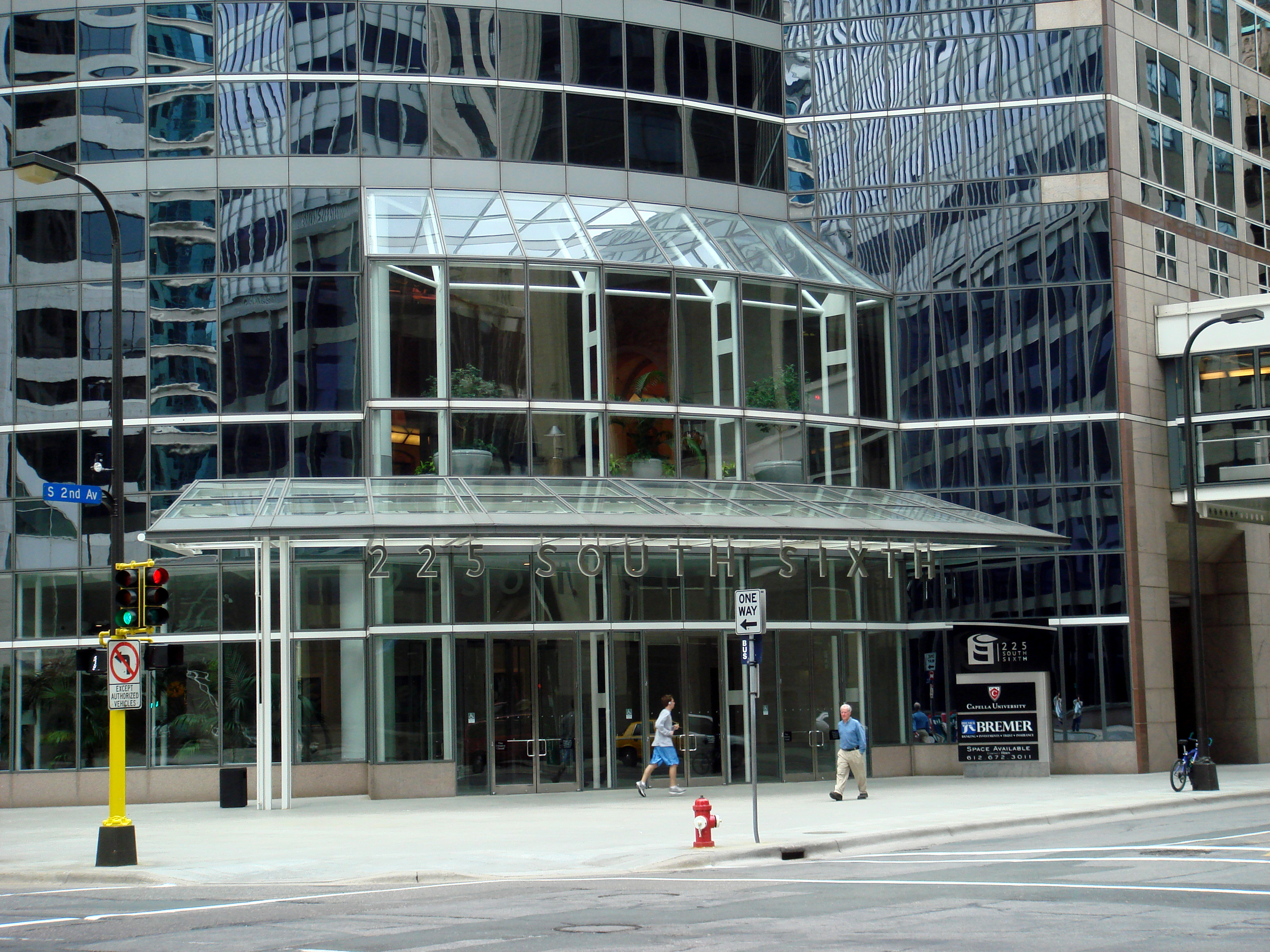
Entrance to Capella Education Corporation headquarters at 225 South Sixth in Minneapolis

Strategic Education, Inc. (SEI), formerly known as Strayer Education, Inc., is an education services holding company. The company owns for-profit, online Capella University and Strayer University, as well as non-degree programs schools such as DevMountain, Hackbright Academy, and Sophia Learning.

== History ==
In August 2018, Capella Education Company merged with Strayer Education, Inc., in a $1.9 billion deal. The two publicly traded parent companies combined corporate functions; however, the universities remain operating as separate institutions. Strayer shareholders control 52% of Strategic Education, while Capella shareholders control the other 48%.

In July 2020, Strategic Education announced a series of acquisitions: Laureate Education, Inc.'s Australia and New Zealand operations for a reported $642 million; Torrens University in Australia and Think Education and Media Design School in New Zealand for a combined $900 million.

Strayer University and Capella University collectively serve about 80,000 students.

=== Capella Education Company ===
Capella Education Company was founded in 1991 by Stephen Shank, former CEO of Tonka Corporation. In 1993, it opened The Graduate School of America (TGSA). In 1999, the company and university were renamed to Capella Education Company and University. In 2003, the company was named to Inc. magazine's Inc. 500 Hall of Fame after being named one of America's 500 Fastest-Growing Private Companies for the fifth year in a row. Prior to going public the company raised more than $67 million from private investors, including Maveron.

On January 8, 2005, Capella Education Co. said it had two new investors following deals totaling more than $60 million. The company announced its intentions to go public with an initial public offering in April 2005. It reported 2005 earnings of $10.2 million on sales of nearly $150 million. On November 9, 2006, it completed a public offering that raised $80 million.

In March 2008, Capella Education Co., longtime occupant the 225 South Sixth skyscraper in downtown Minneapolis, signed a new lease that changed the name of the building to Capella Tower. The expanded facility housed all of the company's 1,150 downtown Minneapolis employees, since Capella, as the online school does not have classrooms, the space houses administrative staff and faculty. The name change took place in March 2009.

In July 2011, Capella Education Company acquired the UK based Resource Development International Ltd to gain access to the fast-growing international higher education market. In August 2015, RDI received approval in the UK to become the newly formed Arden University in 2015. The following year Capella sold Arden University and its subsidiaries to Global University Systems.

In April 2016, Capella Education Company acquired the software engineering school for women, Hackbright Academy and coding bootcamp, DevMountain.

=== Strategic Education, Inc. ===
Strayer Education Inc. was a publicly traded corporation, established as a holding company for the college and other assets in 1996. The company was created to take what was then Strayer College public and raise capital for expansion. Its corporate headquarters are in Herndon, Virginia. Karl McDonnell has been CEO since May 2013. McDonnell joined Strayer in July 2006, and was previously president and COO. Previous CEO Robert S. Silberman, who took the position in March 2001, was named executive chairman of the board.

Between 2001 and 2005, the company's main owners were New Mountain Capital and a private equity unit of Deutsche Bank, DB Capital. In 2021, Strategic Education's top shareholders are BlackRock, T. Rowe Price, and Vanguard Group.

In 2009, Robert S. Silberman had a total compensation of $41.5 million, a large portion of which was restricted stock that does not vest until 2019. This was the highest compensation in the for-profit education industry and led in 2010 to the Washington Post naming him the most highly compensated CEO in the Washington, D.C., area. His annual compensation in 2010 was $1.5 million.

In 2010, Strayer (STRA) shares peaked at $253. but the stock dropped to $34 in 2013. By June 2020, however, STRA shares had rebounded to $170 a share. In November 2021, shares are $61, dropping 35 percent for the year.
