= Eta Sigma Delta =

American honor society for hospitality management

- ΗΣΔ
- Founded: 1978; 48 years ago University of New Hampshire
- Type: Honor
- Affiliation: Council on Hotel, Restaurant, and Institutional Education
- Status: Active
- Emphasis: Hospitality
- Scope: International
- Pillars: Excellence, Leadership, Creativity, Service, and Ethics
- Colors: Blue and White
- Symbol: Key Ring
- Publication: Journal of Hospitality & Tourism Cases
- Chapters: 90
- Headquarters: International CHRIE ESD; 2810 North Parham Road, Suite 230; Richmond, Virginia 23294; United States
- Website: www.chrie.org/eta-sigma-delta

Eta Sigma Delta International Hospitality Management Society (ΗΣΔ or ESD) is an international honor society for hospitality students. The organization was established in 1978 at the University of New Hampshire and has about ninety active chapters. The Council on Hotel, Restaurant, and Institutional Education administers Eta Sigma Delta.

== History ==
Eta Sigma Delta was founded in 1978 by a group of students in the University of New Hampshire's Whittemore School of Business and Economics. It is an international honor society that recognizes academic excellence by hospitality and tourism students.

In 1997, Its board of governors voted to combine the society with Alpha Chi Tau (AXT), a similar hospitality management society. The Council on Hotel, Restaurant, and Institutional Education (CHRIE) administers the organization, with headquarters in Richmond, Virginia.

The organization has chartered more than 90 chapters.

== Symbols ==
Eta Sigma Delta's five points of honor or pillars are excellence, leadership, creativity, service, and ethics. Its colors are blue and white. Graduating members may wear a blue and white honor cord. The society's symbol is a key ring. Its publication is the Journal of Hospitality & Tourism Cases.

== Membership ==
Membership is open to hospitality management students who have completed one year of coursework, are in the top twenty percent of their class, and have at least a 3.0 grade point average.

== Chapters ==
Chapters of Eta Sigma Delta are only located at institutions that are recognized by CHRIE. Following are the chapters of Eta Sigma Delta, with inactive institutions in italics.

Chapter	Charter date	Institution	Location	Status	Ref.
		American Military University	Charles Town, West Virginia	Inactive	
		American Public University	Charles Town, West Virginia	Inactive	
		Arkansas Tech University	Russellville, Arkansas	Active	
		Angell Akademie Freiberg	Freiberg, Baden-Württemberg, Germany	Inactive	
		The Art Institute of Raleigh–Durham	Durham, North Carolina	Inactive	(Note: This branch of the Art Institute was permanently closed on July 7, 2019.)
		Asheville–Buncombe Technical Community College	Asheville, North Carolina	Inactive	
		Auburn University	Auburn, Alabama	Active	
		Bethune–Cookman University	Daytona Beach, Florida	Active	
		Boston University	Boston, Massachusetts	Active	
		California State Polytechnic University, Pomona	Pomona, California	Active	
		California State University, Long Beach	Long Beach, California	Active	
		Cesar Ritz Colleges	Le Bouveret, Switzerland	Active	
		Cesar Ritz Colleges	Brig, Switzerland	Active	
		Cheyney University of Pennsylvania	Cheyney, Pennsylvania	Inactive	
		Chinese University of Hong Kong	New Territories, Hong Kong	Active	
		Coastal Carolina University	Conway, South Carolina	Active	
		College of Charleston	Charleston, South Carolina	Active	
		College of the Ozarks	Point Lookout, Missouri	Inactive	
		Columbus State Community College	Columbus, Ohio	Inactive	
		The Culinary Institute of America	Hyde Park, New York	Active	
		Cuyahoga Community College	Cuyahoga County, Ohio	Inactive	
		Delaware State University	Dover, Delaware	Inactive	
		DePaul University	Chicago, Illinois	Active	
		Drexel University	Philadelphia, Pennsylvania	Inactive	
		Durham Technical Community College	Durham, North Carolina	Active	
		East Carolina University	Greenville, North Carolina	Active	
	1986	East Stroudsburg University of Pennsylvania	East Stroudsburg, Pennsylvania	Active	
		Eastern Michigan University	Ypsilanti, Michigan	Inactive	
		Endicott College	Beverly, Massachusetts	Active	
		Everest University	Fort Lauderdale, Florida	Inactive	(Note: Chapter was formed at Florida Metropolitan University, called Endicott College after 2010. The university closed in 2020.)
		Fairleigh Dickinson University	Madison, New Jersey	Active	
		Ferris State University	Big Rapids, Michigan	Inactive	
		Ferris State University	Flint, Michigan	Inactive	
		Ferris State University	Grand Rapids, Michigan	Inactive	
		Florida Gulf Coast University School of Resort & Hospitality	Fort Myers, Florida	Active	
		Florida International University	University Park, Florida	Active	
		Florida State University	Tallahassee, Florida	Active	
		Fort Hays State University	Hays, Kansas	Active	
		Georgia Southern University	Statesboro, Georgia	Inactive	
		Georgia State University	Atlanta, Georgia	Active	
		Glion Institute of Higher Education	Montreux, Vaud, Switzerland	Active	
		Glion Institute of Higher Education	London, England	Active	
		Grayson College	Grayson County, Texas	Active	
		Haaga-Helia University of Applied Sciences	Pasila, Helsinki, Finland	Inactive	
		HEC Marbella	Marbella, Málaga, Spain	Inactive	
		Hong Kong Polytechnic University	Kowloon, Hong Kong	Active	
	2011	Husson University	Bangor, Maine	Active	
		IMI International Management Institute Switzerland	Lucerne, Switzerland	Inactive	
	March 26, 1990	Indiana University of Pennsylvania	Indiana, Pennsylvania	Active	
		Indiana University–Purdue University Indianapolis	Indianapolis, Indiana	Inactive	
		Iowa State University	Ames, Iowa	Active	
Omega Mu	1978	James Madison University	Harrisonburg, Virginia	Active	
		Johnson & Wales University	Providence, Rhode Island	Active	
		Johnson & Wales University, Charlotte Campus	Charlotte, North Carolina	Inactive	
		Johnson & Wales University, Denver Campus	Denver, Colorado	Inactive	(Note: The chapter closed in 2021.)
		Johnson & Wales University, North Miami, Campus	North Miami, Florida	Inactive	
		Kansas State University	Manhattan, Kansas	Active	
		Kendall College	Chicago, Illinois	Inactive	
		Kent State University	Kent, Ohio	Inactive	
		Lasell College	Newton, Massachusetts	Inactive	
		Le Cordon Bleu College of Culinary Arts in Austin	Austin, Texas	Inactive	(Note: All American Le Cordon Bleu College locations closed in 2017.)
		Le Cordon Bleu College of Culinary Arts in Orlando	Orlando, Florida	Inactive	
		Le Cordon Bleu Institute of Culinary Arts in Pittsburgh	Pittsburgh, Pennsylvania	Inactive	
	2002	Les Roches International School of Hotel Management	Valais, Switzerland	Active	
		Les Roches Marbella International School of Hotel Management	Marbella, Spain	Active	
		Lynn University	Boca Raton, Florida	Active	
		Michigan State University	East Lansing, Michigan	Active	
		Mississippi University for Women	Columbus, Mississippi	Inactive	
		Missouri State University	Springfield, Missouri	Active	
		Mount Ida College	Newton, Massachusetts	Inactive	(Note: College closed in 2018.)
		New Mexico State University	Las Cruces, New Mexico	Active	
	1990	Niagara University	Lewiston, New York	Active	
		Nicholls State University	Thibodaux, Louisiana	Active	
		North Carolina Central University	Durham, North Carolina	Active	
		Northern Arizona University	Flagstaff, Arizona	Active	
		Northampton Community College	Bethlehem, Pennsylvania	Active	
		Northampton Community College	Tannersville, Pennsylvania	Active	
		Ohio State University	Columbus, Ohio	Inactive	
		Oklahoma State University	Stillwater, Oklahoma	Active	
		Paul Smith's College	Paul Smiths, New York	Inactive	
		Penn State Berks	Spring Township, Berks County, Pennsylvania	Inactive	
		Pennsylvania State University,	University Park, Pennsylvania	Active	
		Pensacola State College	Pensacola, Florida	Inactive	
		Purdue University	West Lafayette, Indiana	Active	
		Purdue University Northwest	Hammond, Indiana	Active	
		The Restaurant School at Walnut Hill College	University City, Philadelphia, Pennsylvania	Inactive	
		Rochester Institute of Technology	Rochester, New York	Active	
		Rochester Institute of Technology Croatia	Dubrovnik, Croatia	Active	
		St. Cloud State University	St. Cloud, Minnesota	Inactive	
		St. Joseph’s College	Brooklyn, New York	Inactive	
		Salve Regina University	Newport, Rhode Island	Active	
		Schiller International University	Tampa, Florida	Inactive	
		South Dakota State University	Brookings, South Dakota	Active	
		South Seattle College	Seattle, Washington	Inactive	
		Southern Illinois University Carbondale	Carbondale, Illinois	Active	
		Southern New Hampshire University	Manchester, New Hampshire	Inactive	
		State University College at Buffalo	Buffalo, New York	Inactive	
		State University of New York at Morrisville	Morrisville, New York	Inactive	
		State University of New York at Plattsburgh	Plattsburgh, New York	Inactive	
	April 2016	Stephen F. Austin State University	Nacogdoches, Texas	Active	
		Stockton University	Galloway Township, New Jersey	Active	
		Stratford University	Alexandria, Virginia	Inactive	(Note: The university closed all three of its locations in December 2022.)
		Temple University	Philadelphia, Pennsylvania	Active	
	2024	Texas A&M University	College Station, Texas	Active	
		Texas Tech University	Lubbock, Texas	Active	
		Troy University	Troy, Alabama	Active	
		Tuskegee University	Tuskegee, Alabama	Inactive	
		Universidad San Ignacio de Loyola	Lima, Peru	Inactive	
		Universities at Shady Grove	Rockville, Maryland	Inactive	
		University of Alabama	Tuscaloosa, Alabama	Active	
		University of Arkansas	Fayetteville, Arkansas	Active	
		University of Central Florida, Rosen College of Hospitality Management	Orlando, Florida	Active	
		University of Delaware	Newark, Delaware	Active	
		University of Georgia	Athens, Georgia	Active	
	2022	University of Florida	Gainesville, Florida	Active	
		University of Hawaiʻi at Mānoa, Shidler College of Business	Manoa, Honolulu, Hawaii	Active	
		University of Hawaiʻi at West Oʻahu	Kapolei, Hawaii	Active	
		University of Houston	Houston, Texas	Active	
		University of Louisiana at Lafayette	Lafayette, Louisiana	Active	
		University of Macau	Zhuhai, Guangdong, Macau	Active	
		University of Maryland Eastern Shore	Princess Anne, Maryland	Active	
		University of Massachusetts Amherst	Amherst, Massachusetts	Active	
		University of Memphis	Memphis, Tennessee	Active	
		University of Missouri	Columbia, Missouri	Active	
		University of Nevada, Las Vegas, William F. Harrah College of Hospitality	Paradise, Nevada	Active	
	1978	University of New Hampshire	Durham, New Hampshire	Active	
		University of New Haven	West Haven, Connecticut	Inactive	
		University of New Orleans	New Orleans, Louisiana	Active	
		University of North Carolina at Greensboro	Greensboro, North Carolina	Active	
		University of North Texas	Denton, Texas	Active	
		University of the Philippines Diliman, College of Home Economics	Quezon City, Philippines	Active	
		University of Pittsburgh at Bradford	Bradford, Pennsylvania	Active	
		University of South Carolina	Columbia, South Carolina	Active	
		University of South Carolina Beaufort, Hospitality, Resort and Tourism Management	Hilton Head Island, South Carolina	Active	
	2020	University of South Florida	Tampa, Florida	Active	
	2018	University of South Alabama	Mobile, Alabama	Active	
		University of Southern Maine, Tourism and Hospitality Program	Portland, Maine	Active	
		University of Southern Mississippi	Hattiesburg, Mississippi	Active	
		Utah Valley University	Orem, Utah	Inactive	
		Virginia State University	Ettrick, Virginia	Active	
		Virginia Tech	Blacksburg, Virginia	Active	
		Virginia State University	Ettrick, Virginia	Active	
		Washington State University	Pullman, Washington	Inactive	
		West Virginia University	Morgantown, West Virginia	Active	
		Western Carolina University	Cullowhee, North Carolina	Active	
		Widener University	Chester, Pennsylvania	Active	
		Wor–Wic Community College	Salisbury, Maryland	Active	
		York College of Pennsylvania	Spring Garden Township, Pennsylvania	Active	

== See also ==
- Honor cords
- Professional fraternities and sororities
