= Timeline of Austin, Texas =

Coordinates: 30.25°N 97.75°W

The following is a timeline of the history of the city of Austin, Texas, United States.

== 19th century ==
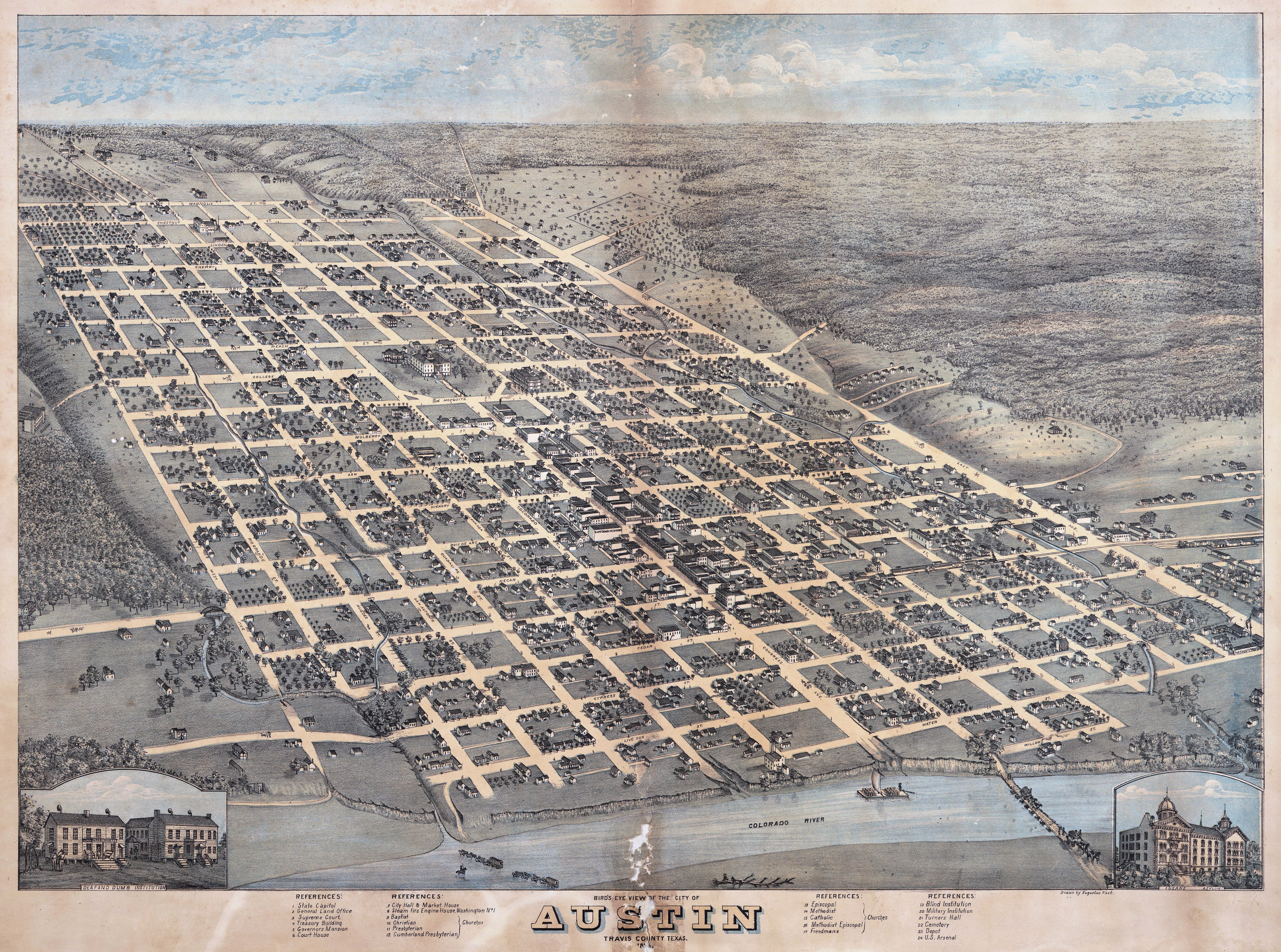
1873 map of Austin

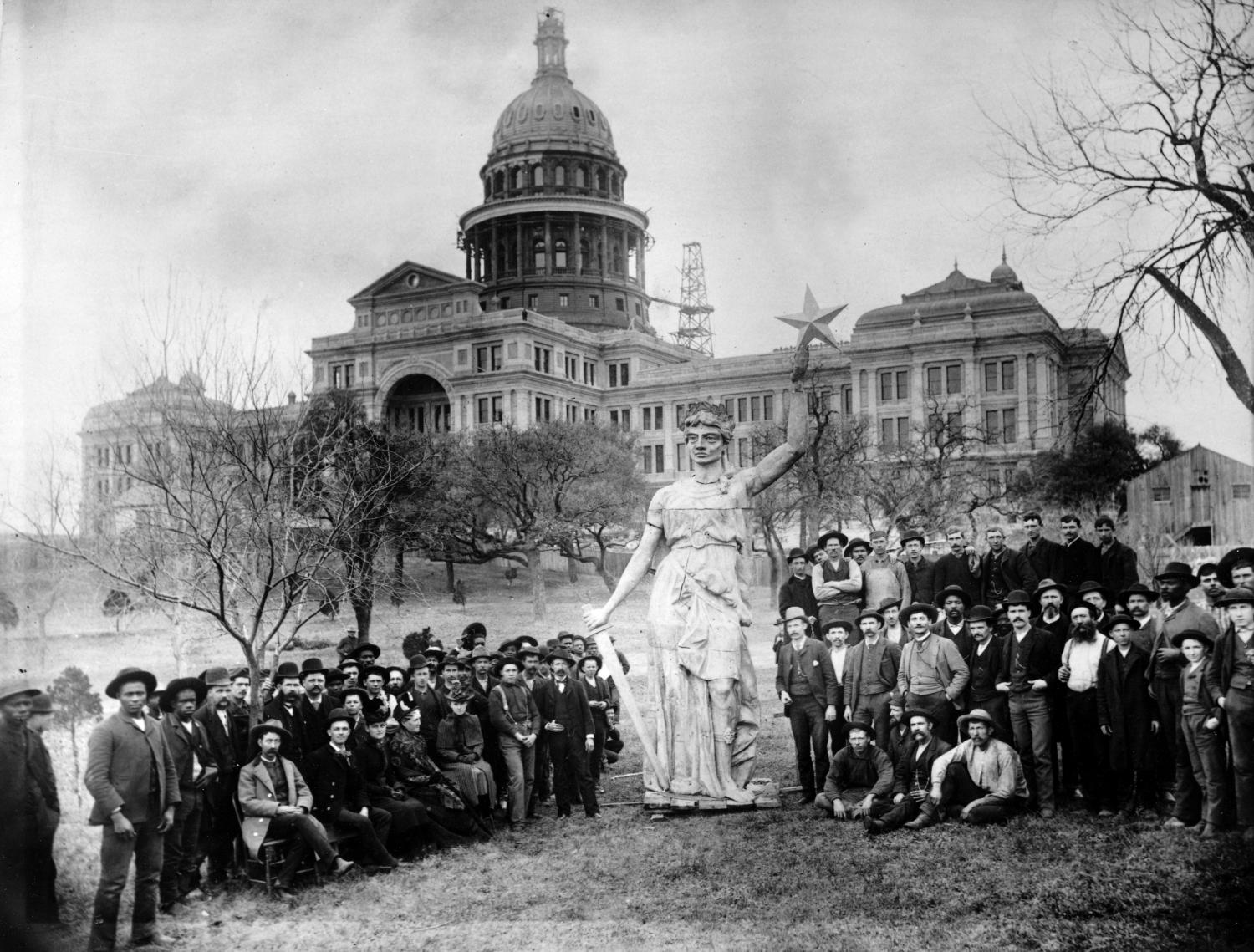
The Goddess of Liberty on the Texas State Capitol Grounds prior to installation on top of the capitol rotunda.

- 1839
  - Austin designated capital of the Republic of Texas.
  - Waller Plan is developed as Austin's first city plan.
  - December 27: Austin incorporated.
- 1840
  - Edwin Waller becomes first mayor.
- 1841
  - Houston-Austin coach begins operating.
  - Austin Lyceum active.
  - French Legation built.
- 1842 – Texas seat of government relocated from Austin to Houston.
- 1845 – Austin becomes part of the new U.S. state of Texas.
- 1846 – Texas seat of government relocated back to Austin from Houston.
- 1850 – Population: 3,841.
- 1854 – Swenson Building and Ziller Building constructed.
- 1855
  - Texas State Capitol built.
  - St. David's Episcopal Church consecrated.
- 1857 – General Land Office Building constructed.
- 1859 – Buaas's Hall (assembly room) renovated.
- 1860 – Wharton College opens.
- 1871
  - Houston and Texas Central Railroad begins operating.
  - Democratic Statesman newspaper begins publication.
- 1872
  - Connectional High School and Institute founded.
  - Penn's Circulating Library in business.
- 1873 – Austin Library Association active.
- 1874 – St. Mary's Academy founded.
- 1875 – Austin City Railroad begins operating.
- 1876 – International–Great Northern Railroad begins operating.
- 1877
  - Stuart Female Seminary founded.
  - Tillotson College chartered.
- 1878 – St. Edward's University founded.
- 1881
  - November 9: State Capitol building burns down.
  - University of Texas at Austin established.
  - Austin High School opens.
- 1884
  - Congregation Beth Israel synagogue established.
  - Servant Girl Annihilator murders begin (ending in 1885.)
- 1885 – St. Edward's College established.
- 1886
  - Driskill Hotel in business.
  - Hill City Quartet formed.
- 1887 – Negro Deaf, Dumb, and Blind Institute opens.
- 1888 – Texas State Capitol rebuilt.
- 1894 – Heart's Ease Circle of King's Daughters (women's group) founded.
- 1895 – Moonlight towers installed.
- 1900
  - April: Austin Dam failure.
  - Samuel Huston College opens.

== 20th century ==
=== 1900s–1940s ===
- 1902 – Nixon-Clay College and Austin Presbyterian Theological Seminary established.
- 1908 – Confederate Woman's Home opens.
- 1910 – Congress Avenue Bridge rebuilt.
- 1911 – Texas Fine Arts Association and International Alliance of Theatrical Stage Employees Local 205 established.
- 1917 – University of Texas' School for Military Aeronautics opens.
- 1918 – State Office Building constructed.
- 1921 – Austin Civic Theatre founded.
- 1923 – KNOW radio begins broadcasting.
- 1926
  - Council–manager form of government effected.
  - University Airport in operation.
- 1928
  - 1928 Austin city plan is delivered to City Council.
- 1929 – Howson Community Center established.
- 1930
  - Municipal Airport opens.
  - Population: 53,120.
- 1933
  - Austin Public Library building opens.
  - State Highway Building constructed.

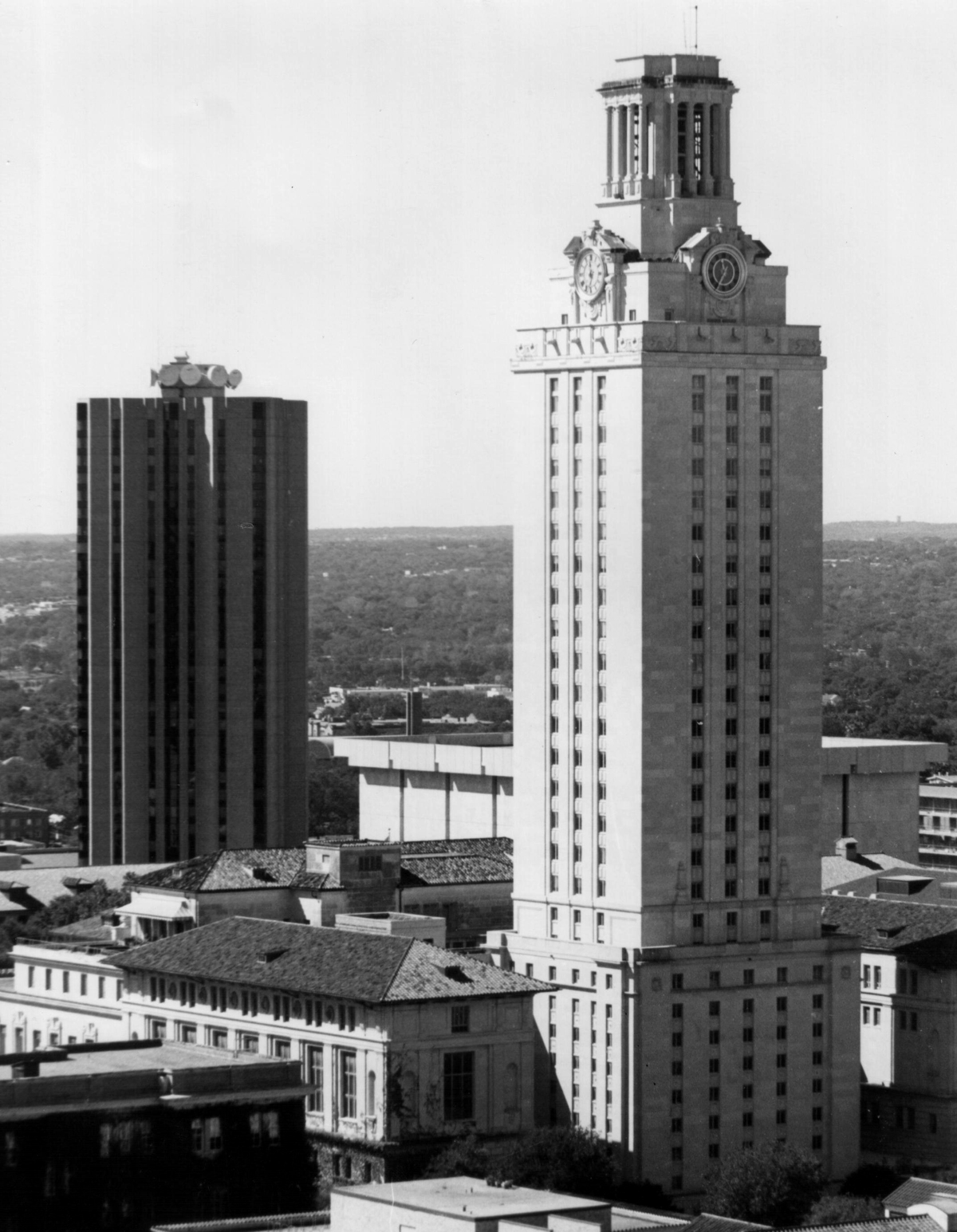
The Main Building of the University of Texas at Austin

- 1934
  - O. Henry House museum opens.
  - Junior League of Austin organized.
- 1935
  - Texas Federation of Women's Clubs Headquarters built.
  - Flood.
- 1937
  - UT Tower built.
  - KTBC radio begins broadcasting.
  - Lyndon B. Johnson becomes U.S. representative for Texas's 10th congressional district.
- 1938 – Montopolis Bridge built.
- 1941 – Austin Daily Tribune Building constructed.
- 1942
  - Bergstrom Army Air Field established.
  - Lamar Boulevard Bridge built.
- 1947 – Roman Catholic Diocese of Austin established.

=== 1950s–1990s ===
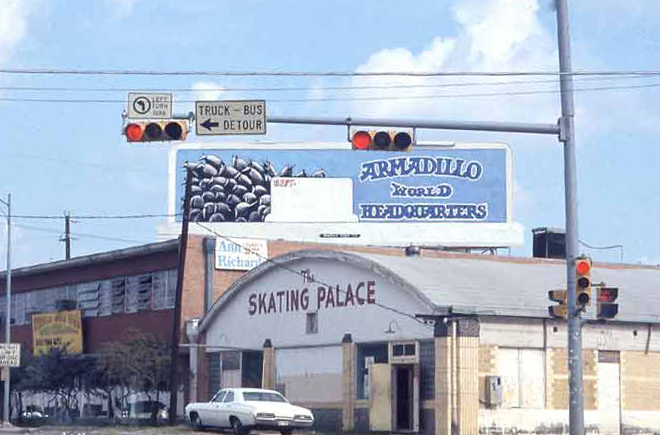
The Armadillo World Headquarters

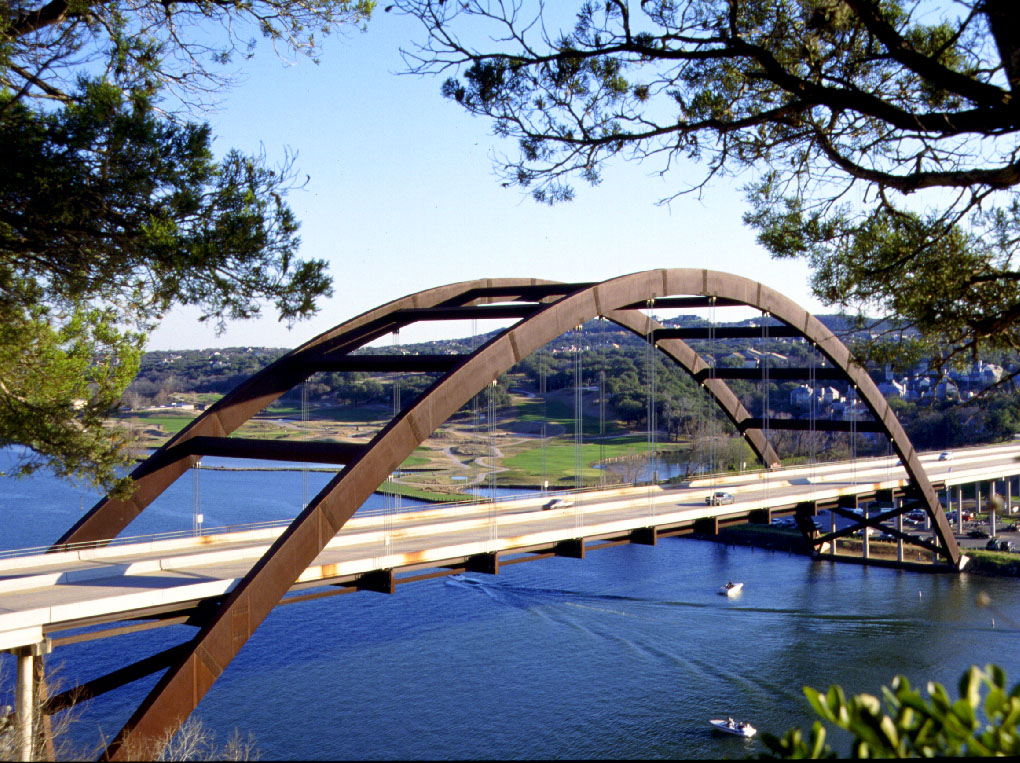
The Pennybacker Bridge

- 1949 - The Austin City Coliseum opens.
- 1950 – Population: 132,459.
- 1952
  - KTBC-TV (television) begins broadcasting.
  - Burnet Drive-In cinema opens.
- 1953
  - YMCA of Austin chartered.
  - Travis High School opens in South Austin; McCallum High School opens in North Austin.
- 1956 – Ballet Academy founded.
- 1958
  - Goodwill Industries of Central Texas established.
  - Town & Country Food Stores in business.
- 1959 - Palmer Auditorium opens.
- 1960 – Population: 186,545.
- 1961 — Lanier High School opens. Its name was changed to Juan Navarro High School in 2019.
- 1962 – Austin Aqua Festival begins.
- 1963 – Jake Pickle becomes U.S. representative for Texas's 10th congressional district.
- 1965
  - The Citizen newspaper in publication.
  - Reagan High School opens. Its name was changed to Northeast High School beginning in the 2019–2020 school year.
- 1966 – August 1: Whitman shootings.
- 1967
  - Vulcan Gas Company music venue active.
  - Fair Housing Ordinance established.
- 1968
  - Crockett High School opens.
  - Sister city relationship established with Saltillo, Mexico.
- 1970
  - Armadillo World Headquarters music venue active.
  - University of Texas' LBJ School of Public Affairs established.
  - Population: 251,808.
- 1971 – Lyndon Baines Johnson Library and Museum dedicated.
  - Highland Mall opens. Closed in 2015.
- 1973
  - Austin Community College and regional Austin Transportation Study established.
  - L.C. Anderson High School (Mesa Drive) and Aquarius cinema open.
- 1975 – Austin Community Gardens created.
  - Northcross Mall opens. Closed in 2010.
- 1976 – Austin City Limits television music program begins national broadcast.
- 1977 – The Frank Erwin Center arena, on the University of Texas campus, opens. Demolished in 2024.
- 1978 – Sister city relationship established with Maseru, Lesotho.
- 1979
  - Austin Public Library new main branch building opens.
  - Austin Shambhala Center founded.
  - ArmadilloCon held for the first time in May.
- 1980
  - Whole Foods Market in business.
  - Population: 345,496.
- 1981
  - Capital Area Food Bank of Texas and Le Chef College of Hospitality Careers established.
  - Austin Chronicle and Austin Press newspapers begin publication.
  - Sister city relationship established with Lima, Peru.
  - Barton Creek Square Mall opens.
- 1982
  - National Wildflower Research Center and La Peña arts group founded.
  - Pennybacker Bridge opens.
- 1983
  - Austin History Center active.
  - Austin Children's Museum established.
  - Sister city relationship established with Adelaide, Australia.
  - The Luedecke Arena on the grounds of the Travis County Exposition Center, opens.
- 1984 – St. Michael's Catholic Academy established.
- 1985
  - Austin Film Society organized.
  - Texas Hill Country Wine & Food Festival begins.
- 1986
  - Austin Lyric Opera founded.
  - Sister city relationship established with Taichung, Taiwan.
- 1987
  - South by Southwest music festival begins.
  - Lamar Smith becomes U.S. representative for Texas's 21st congressional district.
- 1988
  - Dell Computer Corporation in business.
  - Bowie High School established.
- 1990
  - Sister city relationship established with Ōita City, Japan.
  - Population: 465,622.
- 1991 – Sister city relationship established with Koblenz, Germany.
- 1992
  - Austin Convention Center opens.
  - Hyde Park Theatre founded.
- 1993 – Sustainable Food Center and Dharma Drum Mountain Buddhist Association chapter founded.
- 1994
  - Um-Al-Mumeneen-Sayeda-Khadija Mosque built.
  - "Goodwill Computer Museum founded". Archived from the original on May 7, 2013.
- 1995
  - Lloyd Doggett becomes U.S. representative for Texas's 10th congressional district.
  - Ordinary Mind Zen Group formed.
  - City website online.
  - Lakeline Mall opens.
- 1997 – Sister city relationship established with Xishuangbanna, China.
- 1998 – Linh-Son Buddhist Temple established.
- 1999
  - Austin–Bergstrom International Airport opens.
  - Dell Foundation and Foodways of Austin club established.
- 2000
  - Akins High School established.
  - George W. Bush presidential campaign, 2000 headquartered in Austin.
  - Area of city: 251 square miles.
  - Population: 656,562.
  - Sister city relationship established with Orlu, Nigeria.

== 21st century ==
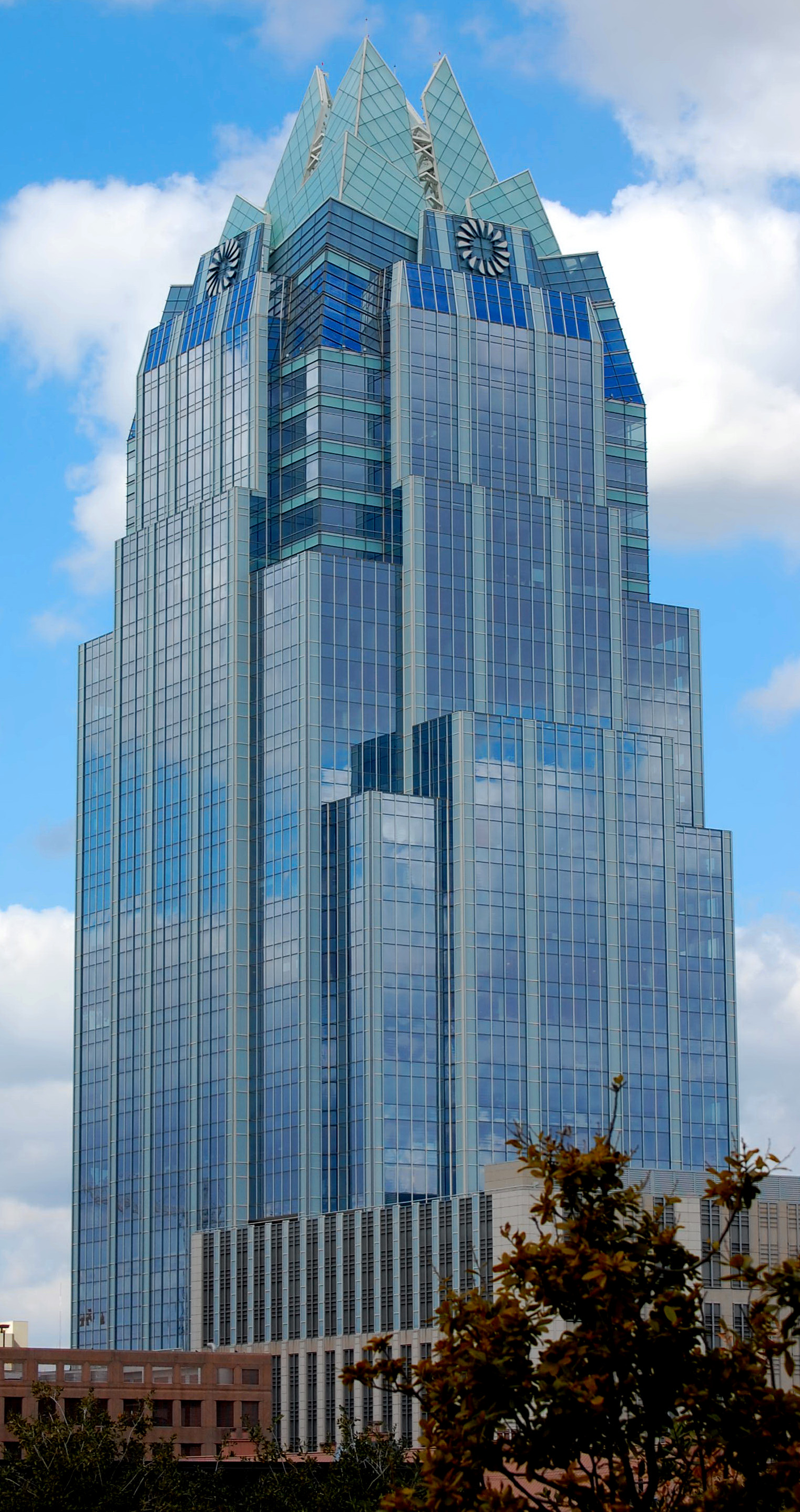
The Frost Bank Tower

- 2001 – Sister city relationship established with Gwangmyeong, South Korea.
- 2002
  - Texas Archive of the Moving Image headquartered in city.
  - The inaugural Austin City Limits Music Festival is hosted in Zilker Park.
- 2003
  - Texas Rollergirls founded.
  - Frost Bank Tower built.
- 2005 – Austin Film Critics Association founded.
- 2009
  - May: Austin mayoral election, 2009 held.
  - Texas Tribune headquartered in city.
  - Sister city relationship established with Antalya Kepez, Turkey.
- 2010
  - February 18: 2010 Austin suicide attack.
  - Capital MetroRail begins operating.
  - Austin Bulldog begins publication.
  - Area of city: 297.90 square miles.
  - Population: city 790,390; megaregion 19,728,244.
- 2011 – Sister city relationship established with Angers, France.
- 2012 – Austin Food & Wine Alliance established.
- 2013 – Population: 885,400.
- 2014
  - November 28: Larry Steven McQuilliams, 49, fired at least 100 shots at several government buildings and a police station before dying of a gunshot wound.
  - Sister city relationship established with Hackney, London.
- 2018 – In March, a series of explosions centered in Austin killed two civilians and injuring another five.
- 2020 – Population: 963,121.
- 2021 – Austin FC of Major League Soccer plays their first game at Q2 Stadium.
- 2022 – The Moody Center arena, on the University of Texas campus, opens. Replacing the Frank Erwin Center.

== See also ==
- History of Austin, Texas
- List of mayors of Austin, Texas
- National Register of Historic Places listings in Travis County, Texas
- Timeline of Texas
- Timelines of other cities in the Southeast Texas area of Texas: Beaumont, Houston, Pasadena

== Bibliography ==
=== Published in 19th c. ===
- "Austin". Texas State Gazetteer and Business Directory. St. Louis: R.L. Polk & Co. 1884 – via Internet Archive.
- Historical and descriptive review of the industries of Austin, Austin, Texas, 1885, OL 7026404M
- "Austin". Texas State Gazetteer and Business Directory. Detroit: R.L. Polk & Co. 1890 – via Internet Archive.

=== Published in 20th c. ===
- Directory of the City of Austin. Morrison & Fourmy Directory Co. 1912 – via University of North Texas Libraries.
- Pearl Cashell Jackson (1915), Austin yesterday and today, Austin, Texas: E.L. Steck, OCLC 18393216, OL 6576381M
- Federal Writers' Project (1940), "Austin", Texas: A Guide to the Lone Star State, American Guide Series, New York: Hastings House
- A.T. Jackson (1954). "Austin's Streetcar Era". Southwestern Historical Quarterly. 58 (2): 235–248. JSTOR 30237667.
- Larry Jay Gage (1960). "The City of Austin on the Eve of the Civil War". Southwestern Historical Quarterly. 63 (3): 428–438. JSTOR 30240883.
- Stuart MacCorkle, Austin's Three Forms of Government (San Antonio: Naylor, 1973).
- Burnes St. Patrick Hollyman (1977). "First Picture Shows: Austin, Texas (1894–1913)". Journal of the University Film Association. 29 (3): 3–8. JSTOR 20687375.
- Austin Human Relations Commission, Housing Patterns Study: Segregation and Discrimination in Austin, Texas (Austin, 1979).
- Ory Mazar Nergal, ed. (1980), "Austin, TX", Encyclopedia of American Cities, New York: E.P. Dutton, p. 36+, OL 4120668M
- Paul D. Lack, "Slavery and Vigilantism in Austin, Texas, 1840–1860," Southwestern Historical Quarterly 85 (July 1981).
- David C. Humphrey, Austin: An Illustrated History (Northridge, California: Windsor, 1985).
- Anthony M. Orum, Power, Money and the People: The Making of Modern Austin (Austin: Texas Monthly Press, 1987).
- David C. Humphrey, "A 'Muddy and Conflicting' View: The Civil War as Seen from Austin, Texas," Southwestern Historical Quarterly 94 (January 1991).

=== Published in 21st c. ===
- Kenneth B. Ragsdale (2004). "Barnstormers, Businessmen, and High Hopes for the Future: Austin, Texas, Enters the Modern Air Age". Southwestern Historical Quarterly. 107 (4): 534–557. JSTOR 30239461.
- David Goldfield, ed. (2007). "Austin, Texas". Encyclopedia of American Urban History. Sage. pp. 52–53. ISBN 978-1-4522-6553-7.
- Andrew M. Busch (2015). "Crossing Over: Sustainability, New Urbanism, and Gentrification in Austin, Texas". Southern Spaces. doi:10.18737/M7W90Q.
- "Austin, TX". U.S. City Open Data Census. Sunlight Foundation and Open Knowledge International. 2018. Archived from the original on November 18, 2018.
