= Laureate Education =

American corporation

Laureate Education, Inc.
- Type: Public
- Traded as: Nasdaq: LAUR (Class A); Russell 2000 component; S&P 600 component
- Industry: Higher education Benefit Corporation
- Founded: 1998; 28 years ago
- Founder: Douglas L. Becker
- Headquarters: Miami, Florida, U.S.
- Key people: Eilif Serck-Hanssen (CEO); Richard M. Buskirk (CFO)
- Revenue: US$1.086 billion (2021)
- Operating income: -US$137.5 million (2021)
- Net income: US$203.7 million (2021)
- Number of employees: 24,000 (2021)
- Website: laureate.net

Laureate Education, Inc. is a company based in Miami, Florida, United States. The firm owns and operates Laureate International Universities, with campuses in Mexico and Peru. The company is publicly traded on the Nasdaq.

== Corporate history ==
=== Beginnings: 1998–2009 ===
Laureate Education was originally created by Douglas Becker in 1998, as Sylvan International Universities, an operational division of Sylvan Learning Systems that would focus on post-secondary institutions. At the time, Sylvan was primarily focused on services for students in primary and secondary education through company owned and franchise locations.

Sylvan International Universities' first acquisition was Spain's Universidad Europea de Madrid for $51 million in 1999. By 2001, the company had expanded to include institutions including Mexico's Universidad del Valle de México (UMV), Chile's Universidad de las Américas, Switzerland's Les Roches International School of Hotel Management, and 41% ownership of the online institution Walden University.

In March 2003, the firm decided to focus exclusively on post-secondary education. It sold the K-12 business units, and the Sylvan name and trademark to Apollo Management, and in May 2004 changed its name to Laureate Education to reflect the new direction. Laureate took full control of Walden in September 2004, after purchasing remaining shares of the university for $109 million. The Baltimore Sun reported in 2004 that "Walden's enrollment grew tenfold from the time Laureate first invested in it four years ago."

In 2007, the firm became private after being acquired by an investor group led by Becker.

=== Growth: 2010–2017 ===
Laureate continued to expand and acquire new institutions after becoming privately owned. By 2010, it owned more than 50 institutions, both campus-based and online, in 21 countries across Asia, Europe, and the Americas. According to the firm, it had a total enrollment of about 550,000 students. Former United States President Bill Clinton held a role as honorary chancellor of Laureate from 2010 until early April 2015. Clinton's publicly disclosed tax returns showed he was paid just short of $16.5 million for his work with the firm. His position included attending meetings on education issues, campus openings, and commencement ceremonies.

In January 2013, the International Finance Corporation, a member of the World Bank Group, made a $150 million equity investment in the firm to expand access to higher education in emerging markets. The firm, which had been present in Brazil since 2005, also bought Brazilian for-profit university chain Centro Universitário das Faculdades Metropolitanas Unidas for $412 million in anticipation of a growing middle-class in Brazil.

The firm was among investors in Coursera, a provider of massive online open courses, citing the opportunity to license courses through Coursera.

Arizona-based Thunderbird School of Global Management announced a partnership with the firm in March 2013 to set up a joint venture that would provide capital support for Thunderbird to open multiple international instruction sites, create an undergraduate program, and expand its executive education and online programs. The partnership proved controversial. Some trustees and alumni expressed concerns that partnering with for-profit education could negatively affect Thunderbird's reputation, while supporters said working with Laureate would allow Thunderbird, which was struggling financially, to maintain its independence.

In December 2013, Laureate announced the election of three independent directors: Robert B. Zoellick, former World Bank president; Judith Rodin, president of the Rockefeller Foundation; and George Muñoz, principal of the Muñoz Investment Banking Group. In 2015, Laureate named Ernesto Zedillo, the former president of Mexico, to the post of Presidential Counselor replacing U. S. President Clinton.

Laureate reported revenue of approximately $4 billion in 2014. At the time, it owned 75 schools in 30 countries. Inside Higher Ed reported that total enrollment among the firm's institutions was 800,000, with its largest school, UVM, enrolling 120,000.

In July 2015, Moody's rated Laureate's corporate bonds as high-risk and characterized Laureate as highly leveraged.

Laureate filed for an initial public offering in October 2015. At the time, it disclosed $4.7 billion in debt, and that funds raised from the IPO would be used to reduce its debt load. At the end of 2015, the firm became a certified benefit corporation, the largest at the time. In 2016, the firm sold its two Glion Institute of Higher Education campuses, and four campuses of Les Roches to Eurazeo for $384.9 million.

The firm began trading at $14 per share on the NASDAQ on February 1, 2017. It initially offered 35 million shares, raising $490 million, and closed its first day at $13.25 per share. The IPO stated that the firm had grown to more than 1 million students and 200-plus campuses in 28 countries, and the IPO was in part a response to a global demand for more higher education among a rapidly growing middle class. It was only the third B Corporation to go public, the first two being Etsy and Rally Software.

=== Decline: 2017–2021 ===
In September 2017, Becker announced his resignation as Laureate's CEO effective January 2018. He was succeeded by Chief Financial Officer Eilif Serck-Hanssen.

In 2018, the firm began divesting in several markets. It sold schools such as Université Internationale de Casablanca in Morocco, and Kendall College, as well as others in China, Malaysia, Italy and Cyprus. Its focus at the time was on its operations in Spain, Portugal, the U.S., and South and Central America.

Laureate continued its divestiture in 2019, including ending its relationship with Istanbul Bilgi University in Istanbul, and selling University of St. Augustine for Health Sciences. In this period, it also closed or sold several schools, including Santa Fe University of Art and Design, Kendall College, Centro Universitário do Norte (UniNorte), Universidad Europea de Madrid, Universidad Europea de Valencia, Universidad Europea de Canarias, Universidade Europeia in Portugal and Instituto Português de Administração de Marketing in Portugal. Laureate also reportedly sold Université Internationale de Casablanca. Laureate also stopped enrolling new students at the University of Liverpool and the University of Roehampton.

The firm's long-term debt at the time was approximately $2.5 billion. It also provided the US Department of Education with letters of credit totaling $137 million for several schools, meant to safeguard federal student aid if the schools closed.

In May 2019, Pública, a Brazilian news outlet, published an investigative report on Laureate Education's practices in the country after 150 teachers were dismissed in December 2018. A dozen teachers accused Laureate of corruption ranging from forged documents to assigning teachers in classes outside of their area of expertise.

In 2020, the firm announced a new strategy to review its operations, including possible sales of schools in Peru, Mexico, Australia and New Zealand. It then entered into an agreement to sell its Australian and New Zealand schools to Strategic Education, Inc., and on September 11, said it would sell Walden to Adtalem for $1.48 billion. The Baltimore Business Journal reported that Laureate executives would receive $19 million in bonuses from the sale of Walden. By November, the firm had divested its universities in Australia, New Zealand and Chile,

Laureate also announced that it would sell its Brazilian operations to Ser Educacional for $724 million. However, the firm received a higher offer of $765 million from Anima Holding during a 30-day period while it was allowed to solicit other offers. 11 institutions were included in the sale of the firm's Brazilian operations. The firm also said it had stopped enrolling students in its United Kingdom programs in 2020. The sale to Anima was completed in May 2021.

In 2021, the firm focused on its continuing operations in Mexico and Peru and plans to safely return to in-class education, noting increased demand for higher-education in those markets. As of June 2021, the firm had reported $522 million in revenue for the year. The Walden sale was completed in August 2021, following which the firm announced a $1.29 billion cash distribution that would be made available to eligible stockholders in October. As of September 2021, the firm maintained operations in Peru and Mexico and said it would continue to operate as a public company.

== Selected revenue and enrollment figures ==
Year	Revenue	Total enrollment	Notes	References
2004	$648 million	130,000		
2007	$659.3 million	243,000	Revenue reported as of June 30, 2007, prior to the company being taken private.	
2013	$3.913 billion	800,000		
2017	$4.377 billion	1 million		
2020	$1.02 billion	336,500		
2021	$522 million	349,000	Revenue as of June 30, 2021	

== Laureate International Universities ==
Laureate International Universities have taught various subjects at both undergraduate and graduate level. Subjects covered by some of its remaining colleges include design, business, culinary and hospitality, and health sciences. As of June 2021, Laureate's continuing operations in Mexico and Peru have a total enrollment of 349,000 students, according to the firm.

Mexico

- Universidad del Valle de México (UVM)
- Universidad Tecnológica de México (UNITEC)

Peru

- CIBERTEC
- Universidad Peruana de Ciencias Aplicadas (UPC)
- Universidad Privada del Norte (UPN)

=== Institutions previously in the Laureate Education network ===
These schools were previously owned or managed by Laureate Education, or offered courses in partnership with the firm.

List of previous institutions in the Laureate Education Network
Country	School name	Year founded	Year Affiliation Began	Year Affiliation Ended	References
Australia	Blue Mountains International Hotel Management School	1991	2008	2020	
Australia	Torrens University Australia	2014	2014	2020	
Australia	THINK Education Group	2006	2013	2020	
Brazil	Universidade Anhembi Morumbi	1970	2005	2021	
Brazil	Universidade Potiguar	1981	2007	2021	
Brazil	Faculdade dos Guararapes	2002	2007	2021	
Brazil	Faculdade Internacional da Paraíba	2005	2007	2021	
Brazil	Business School São Paulo	1994	2008	2021	
Brazil	Faculdade de Desenvolvimento do Rio Grande do Sul	2004	2008	2021	
Brazil	Instituto Brasileiro de Medicina de Reabilitação	1974	2009	2021	
Brazil	Universidade Salvador	1972	2010	2021	
Brazil	Centro Universitário Ritter dos Reis	1971	2010	2021	
Brazil	Faculdade dos Guararapes de Recife	1990	2012	2021	
Brazil	FMU Education Group	1968	2014	2021	
Brazil	Faculdade Porto-Alegrense	2008	2014	2021	
Brazil	Centro Universitário do Norte	1994	2008	2019	
Chile	Universidad de Las Américas	1988	2000	2020	
Chile	Instituto Profesional AIEP	1960	2003	2020	
Chile	Universidad Andrés Bello	1989	2003	2020	
Chile	IEDE Escuela de Negocios	1994	2006	2020	
Chile	Instituto Profesional Escuela Moderna de Música	1940	2008	2020	
Chile	Universidad Viña del Mar	1988	2009	2020	
China	Blue Mountains International Hotel Management School—Suzhou	2004	2008	2018	
China	Hunan International Economics University	1997	2009	2018	
China	Les Roches Jin Jiang International Hotel Management College	2004	2004	2016	
Costa Rica	Universidad Americana	1998	2008	2020	
Costa Rica	Universidad Latina de Costa Rica	1989	2008	2020	
Cyprus	European University Cyprus	1961	2005	2018	
France	École Supérieure du Commerce Extérieur	1968	2001	2016	
France	Institut Français de Gestion	1956	2004	2016	
France	École Centrale d'Electronique	1919	2004	2016	
France	European Business School	1967	2013	2016	
France	Centre d'Etudes Politiques et de la Communication	1899	2013	2016	
Germany	Business and Information Technology School	2000	2007	2018	
Germany	BTK University of Applied Science	2006	2011	2018	
Germany	htk Academy of Design	1987	2011	2018	
Germany	btk Academy of Design	2000	2011	2018	
Honduras	Universidad Tecnológica Centroamericana	1987	2005	2021	
India	Pearl Academy	1993	2011	2019	
India	University of Petroleum and Energy Studies	2003	2013	2019	
India	University of Technology and Management	2011	2013	2019	
Italy	Nuova Accademia di Belle Arti Milano	1980	2009	2018	
Jordan	Royal Academy of Culinary Arts	2007	2008	2016	
Malaysia	INTI Education Group	1986	2008	2020	
Mexico	Universidad del Desarrollo Profesional	2003	2007	2013	
Morocco	Université Internationale de Casablanca	2010	2010	2018	
New Zealand	Media Design School	1998	2011	2020	
Panama	Universidad Interamericana de Panamá	1994	2003	2019	
Portugal	Universidade Europeia	1962	2011	2019	
Portugal	IADE-U—Instituto de Arte, Design e Empresa—Universitário	1969	2015	2019	
Portugal	Instituto Português de Administração de Marketing de Porto	1984	2015	2019	
Portugal	Instituto Português de Administração de Marketing de Lisboa	1987	2015	2019	
Portugal	Instituto Português de Administração de Marketing de Aveiro	1989	2015	2019	
Portugal	Ensicorporate	1986	2015	2019	
Saudi Arabia	Riyadh Polytechnic Institute	2010	2010	2019	
Saudi Arabia	The Higher Institute for Water and Power Technologies	2011	2011	2019	
Saudi Arabia	The Higher Institute for Paper and Industrial Technologies	2013	2013	2019	
Saudi Arabia	Laureate Riyadh Tourism and Hospitality College of Excellence	2013	2013	2019	
Saudi Arabia	Laureate Jeddah College of Excellence	2013	2013	2019	
Saudi Arabia	Laureate Mecca Female College of Excellence	2013	2013	2019	
Saudi Arabia	Laureate Al-Kharj Female College of Excellence	2013	2013	2019	
Saudi Arabia	Laureate Medina Tourism and Hospitality College of Excellence	2014	2014	2019	
Saudi Arabia	Laureate Al-Nammas Female College of Excellence	2015	2015	2019	
Saudi Arabia	Laureate Buraydah Female College of Excellence	2015	2015	2019	
Saudi Arabia	Laureate Wadi Al-Dawaser Female College of Excellence	2014	2014	2019	
Spain	European University of Madrid	1995	1999	2019	
Spain	Universidad Europea de Canarias	2010	2010	2019	
Spain	Universidad Europea de Valencia	2012	2012	2019	
Spain	Les Roches International School of Hotel Management Marbella	1995	2002	2016	
South Africa	Monash South Africa	2001	2013	2019	
Switzerland	Les Roches International School of Hotel Management	1954	2000	2016	
Switzerland	Glion Institute of Higher Education	1962	2002	2016	
Switzerland	Les Roches Gruyère University of Applied Sciences	2008	2008	2016	
Thailand	Stamford International University	1995	2011	2018	
Turkey	Istanbul Bilgi University	1996	2006	2019	
United Kingdom	Laureate Online Education B.V. (University of Liverpool)	1881	2004	2018	
United Kingdom	Laureate Online Education B.V. (University of Roehampton)	2004	2012	2017	
United States	Walden University	1970	2001	2021	
United States	NewSchool of Architecture and Design	1980	2008	2020	
United States	Kendall College	1934	2008	2018	
United States	Santa Fe University of Art and Design	1859	2009	2018	
United States	University of St. Augustine for Health Sciences	1979	2013	2018	
