= Le Cordon Bleu Institute of Culinary Arts – Dallas =

Culinary institute

Le Cordon Bleu College of Culinary Arts – Dallas
- Type: Private
- Active: 2007–2017
- Location: 11830 Webb Chapel Road, Dallas, Texas, United States; 32°54′40″N 96°52′14″W
- Website: Le Cordon Bleu College of Culinary Arts– Dallas

Le Cordon Bleu Institute of Culinary Arts – Dallas was founded in 2007 and is affiliated with the Le Cordon Bleu Schools in North America. Located in Dallas, Texas, LCB Dallas is a branch of Texas Culinary Academy which is owned by Career Education Corporation under a licensing agreement with Le Cordon Bleu in Paris. All US Le Cordon Bleu College locations are scheduled to close in 2017.

== History ==
Le Cordon Bleu Institute of Culinary Arts, Dallas, was founded in 1999. The school began operating in 1999, offering the Le Cordon Bleu Culinary Arts Program to students. The school is associated with the famed Le Cordon Bleu Culinary Arts, Paris, which was established in 1895.

The history of the name, Le Cordon Bleu dates back to the 16th century where King Henry III awarded members of the Order of the Holy Spirit a medallion that was suspended from a Blue Ribbon...or Le Cordon Bleu. In the 19th century a collection of recipes, “La Cuisinière Cordon Bleu”, was published and was well received. The collection's success prompted its publishers to open a culinary school with the Cordon Bleu designation. The reputation of the school spread rapidly, both in France and internationally. Since then, students throughout the world have trained in the culinary arts at Le Cordon Bleu.
