= Manuela Nogueira =

Portuguese author and poet (born 1925)

- Born: Maria Manuela Nogueira Rosa Dias; 16 November 1925 (age 100); Lisbon, Portugal
- Occupations: Author, poet, children’s writer
- Known for: Niece of the poet Fernando Pessoa

Manuela Nogueira (born 16 November 1925) is a Portuguese poet, and fiction and non-fiction writer of books for adults and children. Best known as the niece of the poet Fernando Pessoa (1888-1935), with whom she lived for much of the first ten years of her life, she has published several books about Pessoa and is frequently interviewed by the media about her uncle.

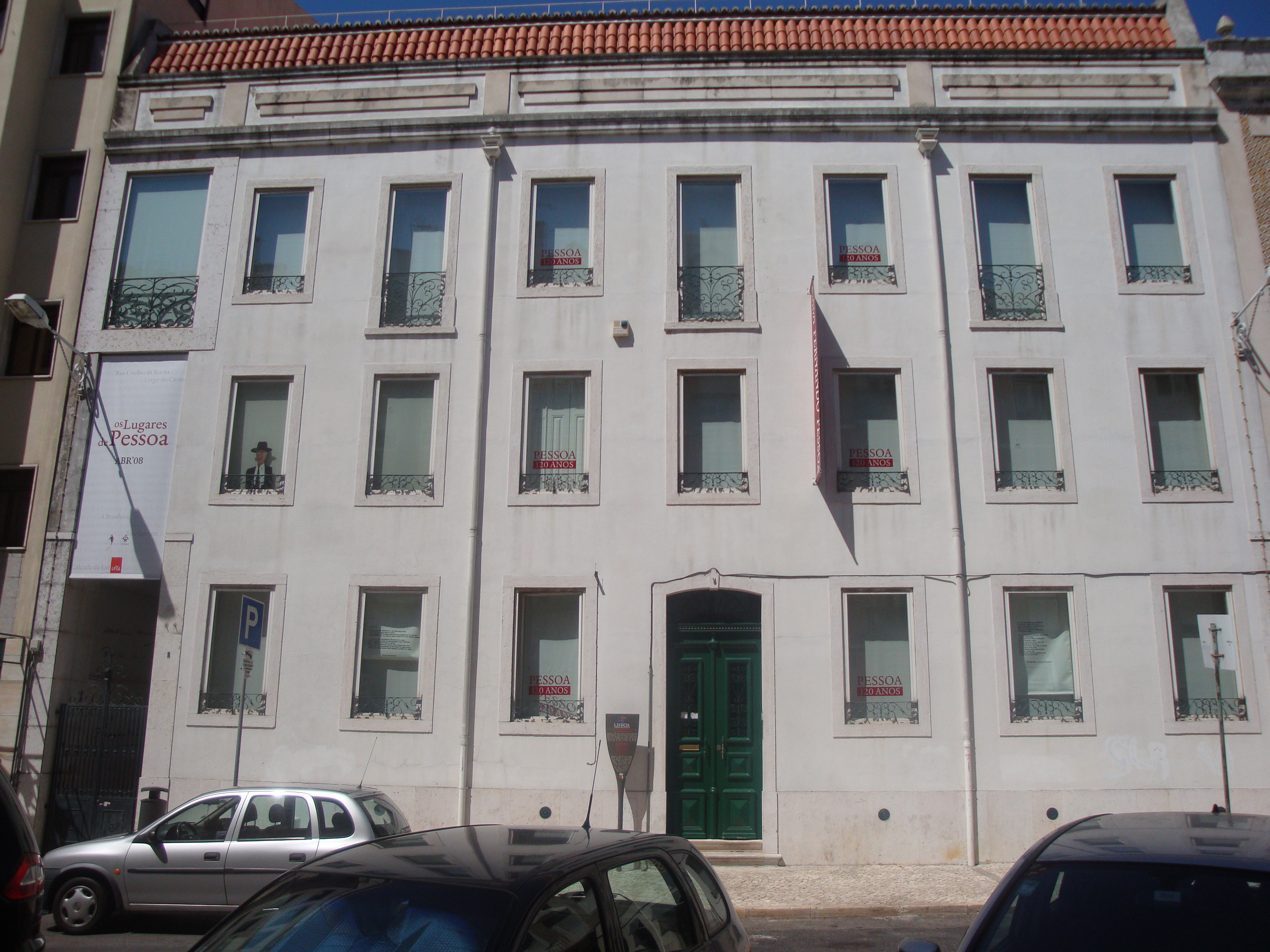
Casa Fernando Pessoa, birthplace of Nogueira

== Early life ==
Maria Manuela Nogueira Rosa Dias Murteira was born on 16 November 1925 in Lisbon on Rua Coelho da Rocha, in the parish of Campo de Ourique, in what is today known as the Casa Fernando Pessoa (Fernando Pessoa House). When she was about five her family moved to Estoril where they kept a room vacant for Pessoa should he wish to stay. They also lived for a time in Évora, where her father was posted as a member of the military.

Her grandfather, Pessoa's step-father, had been the Portuguese consul in Durban, South Africa. Her mother was born there and had attended English schools. She would often speak to Nogueira in English. Nogueira then benefitted from an education in both English and French, attending St. Julian's School a British international private school in Carcavelos to the west of Lisbon and, additionally, studying French at the Lycée féminin in Lisbon. She later studied ceramics, painting and drawing and art history at the Institute of Arts and Decoration in Lisbon.

== Career ==
Nogueira began writing at the age of 20 and published two books for adults and one for children as well as writing newspaper articles. Her first published work was O Dedo Indicador (The Index Finger), a collection of short stories published in 1962. She then worked for around twenty years for a real estate agency that sought accommodation for foreigners moving to Portugal, taking advantage of her fluency in English and French. After this she resumed her writing career and also worked to promote reading in schools, visiting over 80 schools in Portugal for this purpose. She has translated some of Pessoa's work from English and was the designer, together with her daughter, Isabel Murteira França, of the didactic game "The Curious Tourist", which was approved by the Institute of Educational Innovation. A biography, Manuela Nogueira: Desassossego sem Fronteira, was published in November 2023.

As the niece of Fernando Pessoa, with whom she lived for long periods until his death when she was ten years old, she has frequently been asked for interviews by radio, television, and the print media. She has written for Comércio do Porto, Diário Popular, Marie-Claire, and Máxima, among others. She was a founding member and vice-president of the Fernando Pessoa Association.

== Personal life ==
Nogueira was married for 71 years to Bento José Ferreira Murteira, a professor of econometrics and statistics, who died in 2018. They had four children and eight grandchildren.

== Publications ==
Nogueira's publications include:

=== Books for adults ===
- O Dedo Iindicador e Outros Contos (The Index Finger and Other Tales - Short stories). Self-published, 1962
- O Pintor Louco do Meu Tempo (The Crazy Painter of my Time - novel). Guimarães Editores, 1966
- O Melhor do Mundo são as Crianças (The Best in the World are Children - Poems by Fernando Pessoa dedicated to children). Assírio & Alvim, 1998.
- Passeio A Delfos e Outros Contos (Tour to Delphi and Other Tales). Hugin Editores, 2000.
- Dois Amores nas Torres Gémeas de Manhattan e Outros Contos (Two Loves in the Twin Towers of Manhattan and Other Tales - Short stories). Hugin Editores, 2002.
- Fernando Pessoa - Imagens de uma Vida (Fernando Pessoa – Images of a Life). Assírio & Alvim. (Collected photographs of Pessoa), 2005

=== Books for children ===
- Uma Aventura na Quinta da Furada (An Adventure in Quinta da Furada). 1st edition, Atlântida de Coimbra and 2nd Edition, Vela Branca (1970 and 1990).
- O Pilha Galinhas (The Chicken Pile). 1st edition Atlântida de Coimbra, 1972 and 2nd edition, Portugalmundo 1996
- Minha Amiga Lagartixa. Ática Editores, 1981
- O Jardim dos Mil Cheirinhos (The Garden of a Thousand Smells). 1st and 2nd editions, Vela Branca Editions. (1988 and 1993).
- O Estranho Caso do Túnel (The Strange Case of the Tunnel). Colecção à Descobrimento, Editorial Presença, 1992
- O Estranho Caso do Homem Desaparecido (The Strange Case of the Missing Man). Colecção À Descobrimento, Editorial Presença, 1993
- O Teatro na Escola (The Theatre at School). Editorial Nova Arrancada, 1998
- Como Se Faz O Pão. (How to Make Bread). Nova Presença, 1998.
- O Castelo do Rodrigo. (Rodrigo's Castle). Editorial Verbo, 2002.
- O Vasco e o Dia do Aniversário do Pai (Vasco and his Father's Birthday). K Editora, 2009.

=== Biography ===
- Desassossego sem Fronteira (Unrest without Borders). Biography by Conceição Andrade and Carla Parisi. Fundação António Quadros Edições, 2023
