= Timeline of Houston =

Timeline of historical events of Houston, Texas, United States:

== 1800-1899 ==
- 1836
  - August 26: Elizabeth and T. F. L. Parrott sell the southern half of the eastern half of the John Austin Survey to the Allen brothers.
  - August 30: Augustus Chapman Allen and John Kirby Allen place their first advertisement for the proposed "Town of Houston".
  - December 15: Congress selects Houston as the provisional capitol; President Houston signs the bill.
  - The Allen Brothers, John Kirby and Augustus Chapman, co-found Houston.
  - First cemetery is established as "City Cemetery". It stills stands today as Founders Memorial Cemetery.
- 1837
  - January 1: Twelve people live in town, and there is a single log cabin.
  - Mid January: Laura arrives, the first steamboat in Houston, sometime around January 21.
  - April 16: Thomas William Ward begins construction on the capitol building.
  - April 26: Sam Houston arrives at his namesake town. He estimates 1500 people and 100 houses were there when he arrived.
  - Late April: John James Audubon and his son John visit Houston.
  - May 1: Legislature meets in Houston.
  - June 5: The city gets a city charter from the Congress of the Republic of Texas and James Holman becomes the first mayor of Houston.
  - August 28: James Holman sworn in as mayor of Houston.
- 1839
  - The capital of the Republic moves to Austin, causing a dispute over state records.
  - The City of Houston adopts a sidewalk ordinance.
- 1848 - Houston Lyceum incorporated.
- January 1, 1853 - Paul Bremond breaks ground on the Houston and Texas Central Railway.
- 1856
  - April 7: Construction begins on the seven-mile Houston Tap Road.
  - August: Buffalo Bayou, Brazos and Colorado Railway completed from Harrisburg, Texas to the Brazos River.
  - October: The Houston Tap Road is finished to Pierce Junction.
- July, 1858 - Main Street is paved with shells.
- 1860 - The U.S. Census lists 4,845 inhabitants in the town, including 1,069 enslaved.
- September, 1863 - Houston saloon keeper Dick Dowling leads 44 Houston dockworkers to a stunning victory over 5,000 troops at the battle of Sabine Pass. Dowling becomes the city's first nationally known person.
- June 19, 1865 - Juneteenth is an American holiday that commemorates the June 19, 1865 announcement of the abolition of slavery in the U.S. state of Texas.
- 1892 - First annual road race of the Magnolia Cycling Club was held on shelled roads in the Houston Heights.
- Mid February, 1895 - Houston is slammed by its heaviest snowfall on record in mid-February. Over 20 inches buries the city and does not melt for days.

== 1900–1949 ==
- 1900s - Oil is discovered in Texas, from which a new industry will start.
- 1900
  - Population: 44,633.
  - September: Major hurricane strikes nearby Galveston, leading to development shifting north to Houston.
- 1902 - President Theodore Roosevelt approves a one-million dollar fund for the construction of the Houston Ship Channel.
- 1904 - Houston Lyceum and Carnegie Library opens, later known as Houston Public Library.
- 1910 – Population: 78,800.
- 1912
  - J.J. Pastoriza introduces his Houston Single Tax Plan.
  - September: The Rice Institute opens, later known as Rice University.
- 1914
  - April 1: The first jaywalking ordinance goes into effect.
  - November 10: President Woodrow Wilson opens the Houston Ship Channel, part of the Port of Houston.
- 1920s - The Texas oil boom causes people to move into the city, causing its first growth spurt.
- 1920 – Population: 138,276.
- 1925 - KPRC radio begins broadcasting.
- 1927 - Houston Junior College opens its doors as part of Houston Independent School District.
- 1930 – Population: 292,352.
- 1934 - Houston Junior College becomes a four-year institution and changes its name to the University of Houston.
- 1935 - A massive flood inundates Houston, killing eight people; the Harris County Flood Control District is created in the aftermath.
- 1937 - Houston Municipal Airport, which would later become William P. Hobby Airport, is opened.
- 1939 - The University of Houston moves to its permanent location, southeast of Downtown.
- 1940
  - Houston dismantles the last of its streetcar system.
  - Population: 384,514.
- September 18, 1942 - Robertson Stadium opens as Houston Public School Stadium.
- 1945 - The University of Houston separates from HISD and becomes a private university.
- 1947
  - Houston voters defeat the first-ever referendum for citywide zoning.
  - The predecessor to Texas Southern University, Texas State College for Negroes, a historically black college (HBCU) is the first state university in the Houston area. Its name was changed in 1951.
- 1948 - The Gulf Freeway, Texas' first freeway, opens as U.S. Highway 75, signalling the beginning of freeway construction in the city.

== 1950–1999 ==
- 1950 - KPRC-TV (television) begins broadcasting.
- 1958 - Zapata Petroleum in business.
- November 1, 1961 - NASA selects Houston for the location for its Manned Spacecraft Center.
- September 14, 1961 - Sharpstown Mall opens and is the first indoor air-conditioned mall in the world.
- 1962 - Houston voters defeat a referendum for zoning for a second time.
- 1963
  - The University of Houston ends its status as a private institution and becomes a state university. It enters the Texas State System of Higher Education, after a long battle with opponents from other state universities blocking the change.
  - The Manned Spacecraft Center, which would become the Lyndon B. Johnson Space Center, opens on land donated by Rice University.
  - The Humble Building is completed, then the tallest building west of the Mississippi River.
- April 9, 1965 - The Astrodome opens. At the same time, the Houston Colt .45s are rechristened as the Houston Astros.
- 1969 - Houston Intercontinental Airport, now named George Bush Intercontinental Airport, is opened to the public.
- July 20, 1969 - "Houston" becomes the first word spoken from the Moon, by astronaut Neil Armstrong of the Apollo 11 mission.
- 1970s - The Arab Oil Embargo causes demand for Texas oil to boom. People from the "Rust Belt" states such as New York and Pennsylvania migrate to Houston for jobs.
- 1972 - Leonel Castillo is elected City Comptroller. First minority to hold a position in city government.
- 1976
  - Houston Metropolitan Research Center is established.
  - May 11: A tanker truck of ammonia crashes at Interstate 610 and U.S. Highway 59 in the Galleria area, resulting in the deaths of 7 people.
- 1977
  - Houston Area Women's Center founded.
  - National Women's Conference held in city.
  - The University of Houston celebrates its 50th anniversary as the Texas Legislature establishes the University of Houston System—a state system of higher education that includes and governs four universities.
- 1978 - The headquarters of Continental Airlines moves to Houston after buying out Texas International.
- 1978-1980 - Traffic signals at major intersections were improved. Houston is the first in the nation to modernize their signage, which is still done to this present day.
- 1979 - a portion of the master-planned community of "Clear Lake City" that is in Houston's extraterritorial jurisdiction (ETJ) and an area east of Missouri City in Fort Bend County are annexed into the corporate limits of Houston.
- 1980s - The end of the Embargo causes the Houston growth bubble to burst.
- 1981 - Kathryn J. Whitmire is elected as the first woman mayor. She would appoint Lee P. Brown as the first African-American police chief.
- 1982 - Texas Commerce Bank Tower is completed in Downtown Houston, making it the tallest building west of the Mississippi until the late 1980s. It is the tallest five-sided building in the world.
- August 1983 - The University of Houston changes its name to "University of Houston–University Park" to separate its identity and rectify confusions with other universities in the University of Houston System.
- April 5, 1986 - City takes part in celebration of the Texas Sesquicentennial, 25th Anniversary of NASA, and the Houston International Festival with Rendez-vous Houston concert. At the time it is the largest outdoor concert in history and is entered into the Guinness Book of World Records.
- June 1, 1987 - The former Shamrock Hilton hotel is demolished as part of the Texas Medical Center expansion efforts despite protests from historical preservationists.
- 1989
  - Outer Belt Drive (a major thoroughfare that serves Hermann Park and Ben Taub Hospital in the Texas Medical Center) is renamed North MacGregor Way; a section of North MacGregor between Outer Belt and Holcombe Boulevard is renamed North Braeswood. In 2014, the section of Outer Belt Drive was renamed Cambridge Boulevard right after a viaduct was completed over Brays Bayou connecting the southern section of Cambridge Blvd to the Texas Medical Center.
  - Houston Press newspaper begins publication.
- 1990 - Population: 1,630,553.
- July 9–11, 1990 - Houston hosts the 16th G7 Summit.
- 1991
  - August: The University of Houston–University Park reverts to its original name "University of Houston" after controversy and resistance within the university community regarding the name change.
  - November: Elected positions within the City of Houston (the mayor, city council, and controller) were given term limits, which passed by a referendum vote. The term-limit referendum amended the current city charter.
- 1993
  - April: The Westheimer Colony Art Festival is held on a stretch of Calhoun Road (now St. Joseph Parkway) in Downtown Houston; it was the first time the art festival was not held in Montrose. After 1996, the festival was renamed the Bayou City Art Festival.
  - November: Houston voters defeated a zoning referendum for the third time in almost 50 years.
- October 1994 - Great Flood of 1994, highest waters recorded for the San Jacinto Watershed (higher levels than the later Allison storm), a 100-year flood from the remnants of Hurricane Rosa.
- 1994 - Houston Rockets win the NBA Championship, and won 58 games, setting a franchise record.
- 1995
  - Houston Rockets win the NBA Championship again, back-to-back.
  - City website online (approximate date).
- 1996 - The master-planned community of Kingwood is annexed by the city of Houston.
- November 1997 - Former Houston Police Chief Lee P. Brown is elected as Houston's first African-American mayor; at the same time, Annise Parker is the first openly gay or lesbian city council member.

== 2000-present ==
=== 2000s ===
- May 6-May 7, 2000 - After 27 years of holding the Westheimer Street Festival in Montrose, the festival was held in Eleanor Tinsley Park west of Downtown Houston. Promoters of the festival were denied a street closure permit back in January 2000 under a revised festival ordinance in which public hearings are held. Attendance figures declined.
- June 5-June 9, 2001 - Tropical Storm Allison devastates the Houston area. It floods much of the city, including the Central Business District, several cultural institutions, and major hospitals and research facilities in the Texas Medical Center. The storm is called a 500-year event.
- November 2001 - Enron is found to have accounting scandals. The company goes bankrupt.
- 2002
  - University of Houston celebrates its 75th anniversary with an enrollment of 34,443 that fall semester. At the same time, the University of Houston System celebrates its 25th anniversary with an enrollment of over 54,000.
  - Baitus Samee Mosque (Houston) built.
  - November 5 - Houston City Controller Sylvia R. Garcia (in her third term) successfully campaigns for Harris County Commissioner Precinct 2. She becomes the first Hispanic female to hold office in the Harris County Commissioners Court. After Garcia's victory, the Houston City Council appoints Judy Gray Johnson to fill her unexpired term until the November 2003 elections.
- May 2003 - For the first time, the Houston Art Car Parade is not held on the same weekend as the Houston International Festival.
- June 28-June 29, 2003 - The Westheimer Street Festival staged their homecoming on Westheimer during Gay Pride Weekend after promoters decided to move the festival back to Montrose because of declining attendance at another location.
- Fall 2003 - Halliburton's headquarters move from Dallas to Houston.
- December 6, 2003 - Annise Parker defeats fellow council member Bruce Tatro to become Houston's first openly lesbian city controller. Both Parker and Tatro are term-limited in their current seats. At the same time, Pakistani-American realtor Masur Javed "M.J." Khan is elected as a district councilmember in District F. This encompasses most of West and parts of Southwest Houston in the Sharpstown area, where incumbent Mark Ellis won his final term as an at-large member of the Houston City Council.
- January 1, 2004 - METRORail is opened to the public at 1 p.m. CST - this marks the reintroduction of rail service, the city's first since June 1940.
- July 30, 2004 - The Houston City Council unanimously votes for a change in the curbside parking ordinance where Saturday metered parking is enforced. The original proposal for paid curbside parking between 6 p.m. to 2 a.m. was not popular with Downtown-area restaurant owners. (Before the 1980s, metered parking was enforced 24 hours a day - seven days a week, including holidays.) The ordinance took effect on October 22, 2004.
- 2004
  - Houston hosts the Super Bowl as well as the MLB All-Star Game.
  - Citgo's headquarters move from Tulsa to Houston.
- January 2, 2004 - Bill White is sworn in as mayor.
- December 24, 2004 - Freak snowstorm hits, causing record Christmas snowfall in the region.
- 2005 - The Parking Management division of the City of Houston Municipal Courts Administration is incorporated into the Greater Houston Convention and Visitors Bureau.
- Spring 2005 - Friday Nights Brights filmed on Houston City.
- September 1, 2005 - Houston welcomes more than 125,000 displaced residents of Louisiana, Mississippi, and Alabama in the wake of Hurricane Katrina. The Reliant Astrodome was converted to provide food and shelter. The Governor of Texas reaffirmed his state's commitment to provide basic needs and education for victims of Katrina.
- December 10, 2005 - Sue Lovell is elected as an at-large member of the Houston City Council, replacing term-limited councilmember Gordon Quan. This marks the second time an open lesbian is elected to the Houston City Council. Houston is the only major city to have two elected officials who are openly lesbian.
- June 19, 2006 - Major flooding in Southeast Houston causes homes and roads to fill up with water. This was the most rain since Tropical Storm Allison in 2001
- September 1, 2006 - Red light cameras ten major intersections within the Houston City Limits (three of the first ten intersections are located in the Downtown/Midtown area). The red-light camera measure passed by a majority vote on the Houston City Council in December 2004. Motorists who run a red light face $75 civil fines ($150 for subsequent violations) instead of a $220 moving violation when cited by a police officer.
- Spring 2009 - Friday Nights Brights 2 filmed on Houston City.
- December 12, 2009 - Annise Parker wins the runoff election to become Houston's 61st mayor, and the first woman since Kathy Whitmire to hold the office in 1991. With this election, Houston became the largest American city with an openly gay mayor. At-large councilmember Ronald C. Green is also elected as Houston's first African American city controller alongside Aloysius Hoang, the first Vietnamese American elected to the Houston City Council.

=== 2010s ===
- 2010
  - Annise Parker is sworn in as mayor, one of the first openly LGBT mayors of a major U.S. city.
  - The 2010 United States census is released, listing Houston's population as 2,100,263; the population of the Texas Triangle is 19,728,244.
- 2015 - Ted Cruz 2016 presidential campaign headquartered in Houston.
- 2016 - Sylvester Turner is sworn in as mayor.
- 2017 - The Houston Astros win the World Series against the Los Angeles Dodgers.

=== 2020s ===
- 2020 - In the 2020 United States census, the population of Houston is listed at 2,301,572, a 9.6% increase from 2010.
- 2024 - John Whitmire is sworn in as mayor.
- 2028 - Houston is scheduled to host the 2028 Republican National Convention.

== Disasters ==
- September, 1900 - The Great Galveston Storm kills 6,000-8,000 citizens, causing widespread flooding throughout Harris County.
- 1907 - Major storm floods much of Houston.
- December, 1913 - A major Brazos River storm spread to Harris County, causing entire area to flood.
- August, 1915 - The 1915 Galveston hurricane causes major damages throughout Harris County, which experienced heavy flooding.
- April, 1929 - An enormous gulf storm lasts 14 hours over Harris County, floods nearly all of Houston.
- May, 1929 - As the area is still recovering, another major storm hits Harris County, causing major flooding. San Jacinto River reported to be 30 feet higher than usual.
- May, 1930 - A large rainstorm remains stationary over Harris County for 3 days. Rainfall amounts reach as high as 12.5 inches.
- August, 1932 - 1932 Freeport hurricane takes 40 lives and floods Harris County
- December 6–9, 1935 - A massive flood inundates Houston, killing eight people; this leads to the creation of the Harris County Flood Control District in 1937.
- November, 1940 - Heavy rains last 5 days in northeast Harris County.
- July, 1943 - 1943 Surprise Hurricane creates extensive flooding in Harris County
- August, 1945 - 1945 Texas hurricane produces more than 15 inches of rainfall in 24 hours. Flooding reported on all bayous.
- February, 1950 - A thunderstorm preceding a cold front floods Greens Bayou.
- May, 1955 - Major thunderstorm floods northern Harris County
- June, 1957 - Hurricane Audrey crosses the Louisiana/Texas coast, flooding Harris County
- October, 1959 - A thunderstorm floods more than 100 structures throughout Harris County
- June, 1960 - A thunderstorm inundates many areas throughout Harris County.
- September 11, 1961 - Hurricane Carla struck the Texas Coast to the east of Port Lavaca, Texas, bringing heavy rainfall and wind damage to the Houston area.
- February, 1969 - A thunderstorm preceding a cold front floods more than 250 structures.
- March, 1972 - A thunderstorm preceding a cold front floods most of northern Harris County
- June, 1973 - A major storm brings 10-15 inches of rain to Harris County, 10 lives are lost.
- July, 1979 - Tropical Storm Claudette causes record amounts of rainfall to the area, reaching 43 inches of rain in 24 hours in Alvin
- May, 1983 - A large thunderstorm floods several areas along bayous.
- August 18, 1983 - Hurricane Alicia hits Houston and Galveston.
- September, 1983 - Nine inches of rain flood the southern Downtown Houston
- October, 1984 - A thunderstorm in north Harris County floods over 200 structures.
- August 1–October 18, 1989 - Hurricane Chantal and Hurricane Jerry make landfall within a short time-span
- March, 1992 - A major storm floods more than 1,500 structures. Most of I-10 is flooded.
- October 15–19, 1994 - The Great Flood of '94, Hurricane Rosa (1994) leaves a stalled tropical depression over north Houston for a week. With over 30 inches of rain recorded in some places of Harris County, 20 inches in a number of hours, and maximum recorded stream flow volume at all recorded stations in the history of the San Jacinto River. The result was the highest flood levels of the San Jacinto basin to the present day, devastating the north side of Houston and killing 22 people in Texas. Petroleum lines bursting and setting aflame injured another 540 people.
- September, 1998 - Tropical Storm Frances causes extensive flooding along the White Oak Bayou, floods over 1,300 structures.
- October–November, 1998 - Two major storms flood northern Harris County
- June 5–9, 2001 - Tropical Storm Allison devastates the Houston area flooding much of the city including the Central Business District, several cultural institutions and major hospitals and research facilities in the Texas Medical Center. The storm is called a 500-year event.
- June 19, 2006 - Major flooding in Southeast Houston causes homes and roads to fill up with water. This was the most rain since Tropical Storm Allison in 2001
- September 13, 2008 - Hurricane Ike passes through city causing flooding, wind damage and widespread power failures.
- April 17–28, 2009 - Major flooding in West Houston, HCFCD Records one-hour rainfall of 6.9 inches at Clear Creek
- July 9, 2012 - Flooding in northern Harris County, flooding more than 70 structures.
- August, 2014 - Slow-moving rain causes flooding from 3.5 to 4.5 inches in Harris County
- May 13–14, 2015 - Clear Lake Area May 13, pre-Memorial Day Flood Devastating storms floods the south sector of the city. Within a nine-hour span from the night of May 13, 2015, to the morning of May 14, numerous homes in the region flooded and one man died.
- May 25–26, 2015 - Houston Memorial Day Flood Devastating storms floods most of the city. Within a nine-hour span from the night of May 25, 2015, to the morning of May 26, as much as 11 inches of rain fell on parts of the region. A local man died when his car was flooded. Numerous home flooded due to improper drainage system. https://abc13.com/flood-flooding-clear-lake-hospital-webster/720147/
- April 17–18, 2016 - The Houston Tax Day Flood took place in nine counties near the city, unleashing 12 to 16 inches of rain.
- August 2017 - Hurricane Harvey devastates the city, flooding homes and roads with over 50 inches of rain over 4 days, equivalent to 19 trillion gallons of water.
- July 4, 2018 - Heavy rain caused surface flooding on 4 July 2018, dampening Fourth of July celebrations in the city. At least 18 locations in Harris County recorded more than 7 inches of rain in 24 hours.
- September 19, 2019 - Remnants of Tropical Storm Imelda dumped over 9 inches of rain on parts of Houston, the wettest September day ever recorded in Houston.
- February 14, 2021 - The February 13–17, 2021 North American winter storm resulted in widespread power outages and water supply interruptions for several days.
- November 5, 2021 - The Astroworld Festival crowd crush kills at least eight people.

== Murders ==
- August 23, 1917 - Houston riot of 1917 occurs
- September 25, 1970 - August 8, 1973 - "Houston Mass Murders" occur. 27 boys are killed by 3 men.
- July 1978 - Race riots occur in the Moody Park section of the city (in response to the drowning of Jose Campos Torres by two Houston Police officers, and are documented by KPRC-TV, whose reporters are attacked and injured during their report.
- June 24, 1993 - Jennifer Ertman and Elizabeth Pena, two teenagers were murdered at T.C. Jester Park during a gang initiation. Their murders changed laws in Texas, as family members of the victims were now allowed to make a victim's impact statement in court. In addition, the family members of the victims could view executions of the killers.
- April 16, 1997 - Doris Angleton is murdered in her River Oaks home. Her husband, Robert, and his brother, Roger, would be suspected for the crime.
- June 4, 1999 - Noemi Dominguez is shot dead in her home by Angel Maturino Resendiz, a serial killer. Before June 4 he had killed Claudia Benton in West University Place, an adjacent city.
- June 20, 2001 - Andrea Yates drowns her five children in a bathtub. She was found to be suffering from postpartum depression.

== See also ==
- History of Houston
- Houston sister city timelines: Abu Dhabi, Baku, Istanbul, Karachi, Leipzig, Luanda, Nice
- Timelines of other cities in the Southeast Texas area of Texas: Austin, Beaumont, Pasadena
