= IADE Faculty of Design, Technology and Communication =

Higher education institution in Lisbon, Portugal

- IADE – Faculdade de Design, Tecnologia e Comunicação
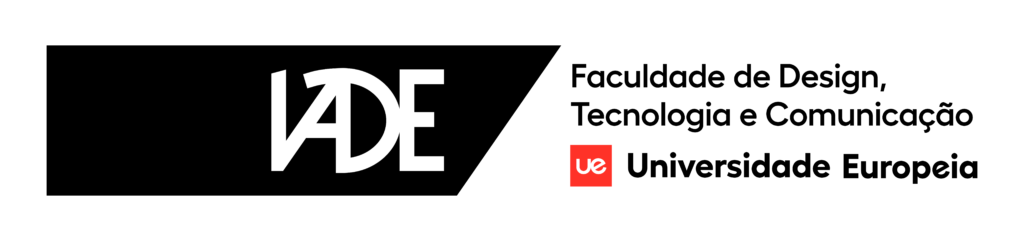
- Former names: Institute of Arts and Decoration; Institute of Visual Arts, Design and Marketing
- Type: Private, for-profit
- Established: 1969
- Affiliations: European University of Lisbon
- Dean: Carlos Rosa
- Location: Lisbon, Portugal; 38.781823°N 9.102505°W Instituto de Artes Visuais, Design e Marketing
- Colors: Black White
- Website: www.iade.europeia.pt

The IADE Faculty of Design, Technology and Communication, (Note: Portuguese: IADE Faculdade de Design, Tecnologia e Comunicação, with IADE standing for Instituto de Arte e Decoração (Institute of Arts and Decoration)) and known previously as the Institute of Visual Arts, Design and Marketing, (Note: Portuguese: Instituto de Artes Visuais, Design e Marketing) and the Institute of Arts and Decoration, (Note: Portuguese: Instituto de Arte e Decoração, IADE) is a private university in Lisbon, Portugal, that operates as part of the European University of Lisbon. Its focused on design, arts, photography, marketing, advertising, communication and creative technology, like games development and creative computing, etc. It was established by António Quadros in 1969.
