= Les Roches Jin Jiang International Hotel Management College =

Hospitality school in Shanghai, China

- 上海锦江国际理诺士酒店管理专修学院
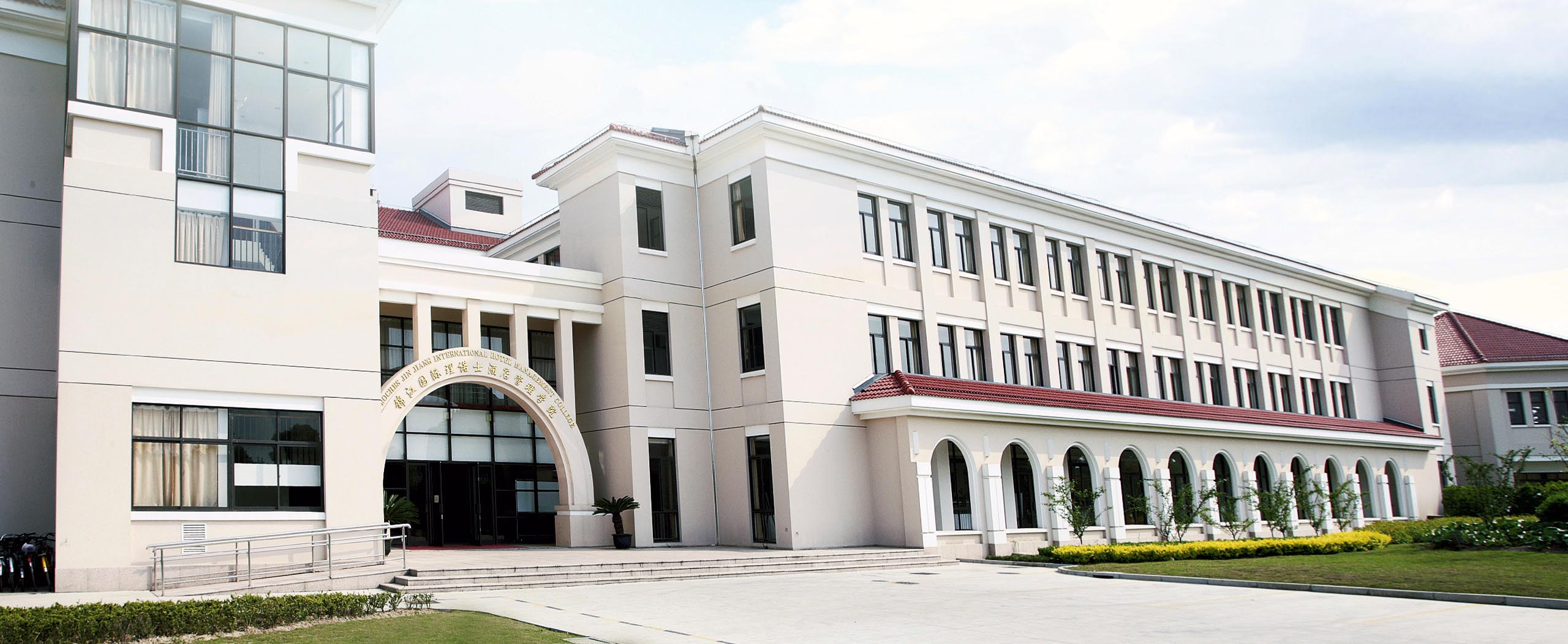
- Les Roches Jin Jiang building
- Motto: Les Roches is not just a school, it's a way of life.
- Type: Private College
- President: BingYan Yu
- Vice-president: Henry He
- Dean: Michael Bao
- Academic staff: Approximately 30
- Students: More than 300 per semester
- Location: Shanghai, China
- Website: www.lesroches.cn www.lrjj.cn

Les Roches Jin Jiang International Hotel Management College
- Simplified Chinese: 上海锦江国际理诺士酒店管理专修学院
- Traditional Chinese: 上海錦江國際理諾士酒店管理專修學院
Transcriptions
Standard Mandarin
- Hanyu Pinyin: Shànghǎi Jǐnjiāng Guójì Lǐ Nuò Shì Jiǔdiàn Guǎnlǐ Zhuānxiū Xuéyuàn

Les Roches Jin Jiang International Hotel Management College (LRJJ), founded in 2004, was a private college in Shanghai, P.R. China. LRJJ offers undergraduate and postgraduate diploma programs in international hospitality management, with more than 870 enrolled students from all over the world.

== Overview ==
Les Roches Jin Jiang International Hotel Management College is a part of Laureate Education, a hospitality management education company.

Since 2009, Les Roches Jin Jiang International Hotel Management College offers programs in international hospitality management taught in English and/or Chinese to 871 students from 47 nationalities; 66% of the student body consists of Chinese students and 34% of international students (based on 2014 data). The campus currently is home to 637 students with 234 students on an international internships.

Dr. Sacha Stöcklin is the campus director and former faculty member of Les Roches Bluche, and there are 31 academic staff from over 17 countries, representing four continents. Michael Bao is the academic dean.

The college offers undergraduate and postgraduate diploma programs in the field of international hotel management with the option to apply to transfer for degree completion at a sister school in Switzerland or Spain, or at a partner institution in the United States.

The undergraduate program hosts about 82% and the postgraduate program hosts about 18% of the student population on campus.

== Accreditation ==
Les Roches Jin Jiang is accredited through Les Roches International School of Hotel Management in Switzerland as a branch campus by the New England Association of Schools and Colleges through its Commission on Institutions of Higher Education. It is also accredited by the Shanghai Education Evaluation Association (SEEA) for Sino-Foreign Cooperative Institutions.

== History ==
In February 2004, Les Roches Jin Jiang International Hotel Management College was founded as the first and only English-teaching Swiss hotel management college in China.

In May 2006, the college moved into a purpose-built facility on the Shanghai Normal University campus in Feng Xian.

In February 2009, the college began enrolling international students.

In September 2010, Les Roches Jin Jiang International Hotel Management College ranked first among international hospitality management schools in China for an international career.

In December 2010, the Education Committee of Shanghai previously publishes the final back checking notice to Chinese-foreign cooperatively run institutions and projects in Shanghai. The college has been formally listed on Chinese-foreign cooperatively run institutions and projects, which is rechecked by the Ministry of Education.

In April 2011, the Bureau of Civil Affairs of Shanghai Municipal Government issues the official rating-list on which Les Roches Jin Jiang International Hotel Management College is rated 4A, ranking first among joint-venture education institutions. 4A is the highest ranking for such institutions.

Since 2012, Les Roches Jin Jiang International Hotel Management College has added a new food and beverage facility for instruction consisting of demo, hot, and cold kitchens including stewarding as well as changing rooms. In spring 2013, the college started to add interactive SMART boards into its classrooms."

In July 2013, Les Roches Jin Jiang was ranked the No. 1 international hospitality management school in China for an international career.

In November 2014, the former coffee shop restaurant was renovated and turned into the à la carte restaurant: Flavors.

== Ranking ==
In a survey of hospitality industry hiring managers, Les Roches Jin Jiang was ranked the No. 1 international hospitality management school in China for an international career. Taylor Nelson Sofres (TNS) conducted the broad industry survey amongst a large sample of senior managers from top international hospitality companies around the world in 2013.

== See also ==
- Les Roches International School of Hotel Management
- Shanghai Normal University
