= Timeline of Pasadena, Texas =

The following is a timeline of the history of the city of Pasadena, Texas, USA.

== 19th century ==
- 1893
  - Settlement founded by businessman John H. Burnett.
  - Schoolhouse established.
- 1895 - Town of Pasadena incorporated.
- 1898 - Pasadena Independent School District established.
- 1900 - 1900 Galveston hurricane.

== 20th century ==
- 1904 - Methodist church built.
- 1917 - Sinclair Oil refinery in business on former Allen Ranch (approximate date).
- 1922 - Harris County Public Library Pasadena branch opens.
- 1924 - Pasadena High School built.
- 1928 - City of Pasadena incorporated.
- 1930 - Population: 1,647.
- 1937 - Champion Paper Mill begins operating.
- 1939 - San Jacinto Monument erected near city.
- 1940 - Population: 3,436.
- 1947 - KIKK radio begins broadcasting.
- 1949 - Pasadena Livestock Show and Rodeo begins.
- 1950
  - Washburn Tunnel opens.
  - KLVL radio begins broadcasting.
  - Population: 22,483.
- 1953 - Red Bluff Drive-In cinema in business.
- 1960 - Population: 58,737.
- 1961 - San Jacinto Junior College established.
- 1966 - Pasadena joins the regional Houston-Galveston Area Council of government (approximate date).
- 1970 - Population: 89,957.
- 1971 - Gilley's Club (bar) in business.
- 1977 - Southmore Cinema in business.
- 1981 - Johnny Isbell becomes mayor.
- 1989 - October 23: Phillips disaster of 1989; 23 employees killed.
- 1990 - Population: 119,363.
- 1993 - Gene Green becomes U.S. representative for Texas's 29th congressional district.

== 21st century ==
- 2010 - Population: 149,043.

== See also ==
- Pasadena history
- List of mayors of Pasadena, Texas
- History of the Galveston Bay Area
- Timelines of other cities in the Southeast Texas area of Texas: Austin, Beaumont, Houston

== Bibliography ==
- Ory Mazar Nergal, ed. (1980), "Pasadena, TX", Encyclopedia of American Cities, New York: E.P. Dutton, OL 4120668M
- C. David Pomeroy, Jr. Pasadena: The Early Years (Pasadena, Texas: Pomerosa Press, 1994)
- Paul T. Hellmann (2006). "Texas: Pasadena". Historical Gazetteer of the United States. Taylor & Francis. ISBN 1-135-94859-3.
- Carol Christian, "Inside East Harris County", Houston Chronicle. 2008-
