= Government of Pasadena, Texas =

The Government of Pasadena, Texas operates under a Mayor-Council form of government with a mayor and eight council members who are responsible for enacting legislation, adopting budgets and setting policies.

Council members are elected by voters in each of six districts and two at-large. They serve two-year terms. Members are term-restricted to four consecutive two-year terms. The mayor is elected citywide. The mayor is restricted to serving no more than two consecutive four-year terms. The mayor is the city's chief administrator and executive officer.

The mayor is entitled to vote on all matters that come before the City Council and may veto ordinances and resolutions adopted by the council. The City Council can override the mayor's veto by a simple majority vote.

The citizens of Pasadena may initiate ordinances to be voted on by the City Council by submitting a petition signed by qualified voters of the city. Citizens also have the power to override legislation enacted by the City Council by submitting a petition of voters. Voters may recall council members or the mayor.

The City Council meets once a week.

== 1965 Government Corruption Investigation ==
In 1965, Houston Post reporter Gene Goltz Received the Pulitzer Prize for his exposure of government corruption in Pasadena, Texas, which resulted in widespread reforms.

== List of mayors ==
- Sam Hoover 1950-1951
- Vernon Whiteside 1951-1953
- Clyde T. Gary 1954-1955
- Clyde H. Doyal 1965-1973
- John Ray Harrison, Sr. 1973–1978, 1985-1993
- Johnny Isbell, 1981–1985, 1993–2001, 2008–2017
- John Manlove, July 2001–October 2007
- Jack Douglass, October 2007–January 2008
- Jeff Wagner, July 2017 – 2025
- Thomas Schoenbein, July 2025 – Present

== See also ==
- Elections in Pasadena, Texas
- Timeline of Pasadena, Texas
- Municipal government in Texas
