= Private University of the North =

Private university in Trujillo, Peru

Northern Private University
- Universidad Privada del Norte
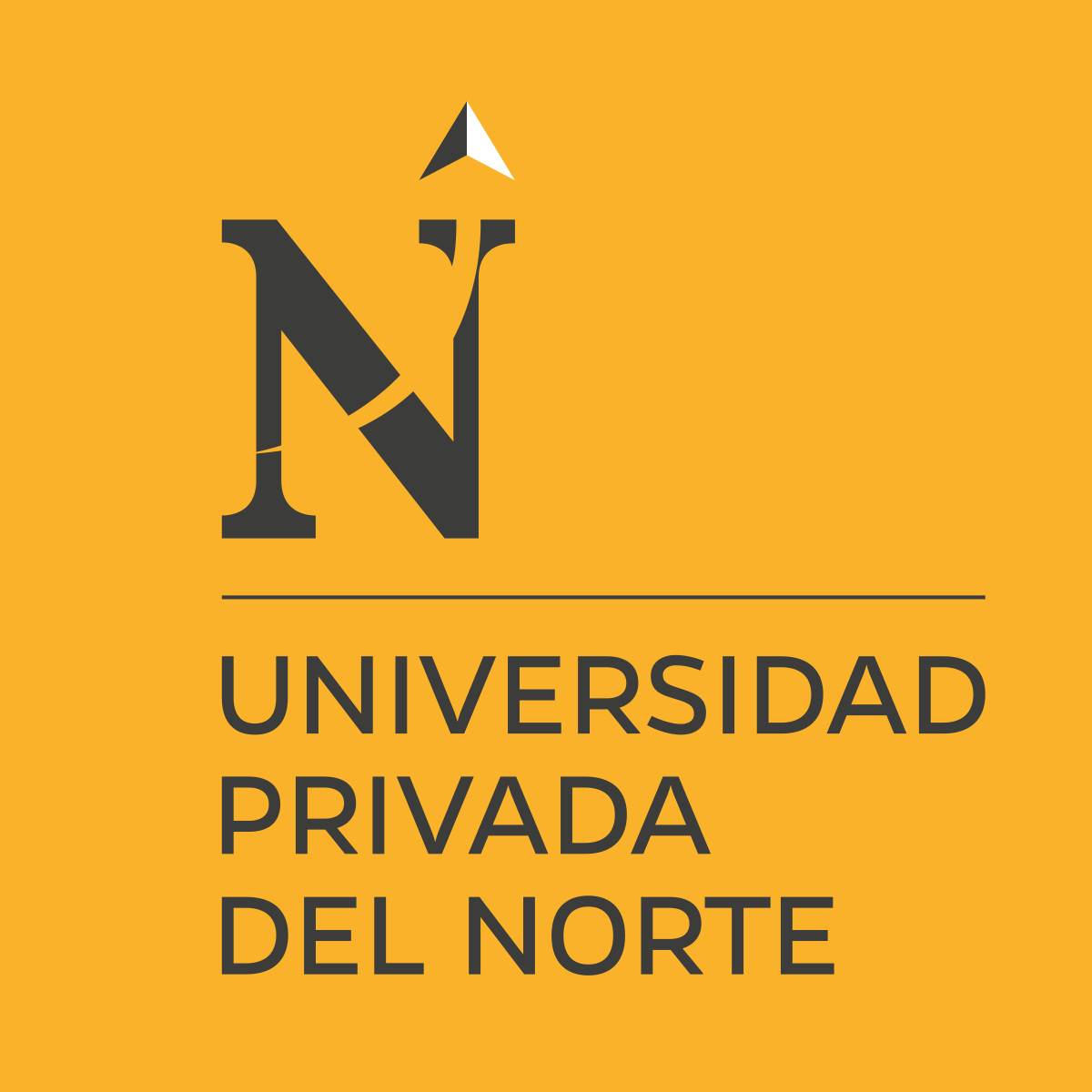
- Motto: "Formamos líderes con responsabilidad social"
- Type: Private
- Established: November 5, 1993
- Affiliations: , Consorcio de Universidades
- Rector: Andres Velarde Talleri
- Students: 10,000
- Location: Trujillo, Peru; 8°5′59″S 79°1′17″W
- Campus: Trujillo: Suburban Cajamarca: Suburban Lima: Urban
- Website: www.upn.edu.pe

Northern Private University (Spanish: Universidad Privada del Norte) is a private university located in Trujillo, Peru. It was established by the Peruvian Congress Law N° 26275, on November the 5th, 1993. The academic activities in the University began on August the 15th, 1994. The Northern Private University has four campuses in Trujillo and Cajamarca and Lima respectively. Today, the University has about 10,000 students enrolled in undergraduate study programs, along with the undergraduate programs, the Northern Private University offers postgraduate programs as well. Since September 15, 2007, it has become a member of Laureate International Universities.
