= Timeline of Beaumont, Texas =

External videos
- 1920s Beaumont by Solomon Sir Jones

The following is a timeline of the history of the city of Beaumont, Texas, USA.

== 19th century ==
- 1838 – Beaumont site designated seat of Jefferson County.
- 1845 – John Jay French house (residence) built.
- 1872 – First Baptist Church established.
- 1876 – Lumber mill in business (approximate date).
- 1880 – Beaumont Enterprise newspaper begins publication.
- 1881
  - Beaumont Fire Company #1 organized.
  - Aldermanic form of government adopted.
- 1889 – Beaumont Journal newspaper begins publication.
- 1890 – Population: 3,296.
- 1892 – Rice mill in business.
- 1900 – Population: 9,427.

== 20th century ==
- 1901
  - January 10: Oil discovered at Spindletop.
  - Texas Fuel Company (later Texaco) in business.
  - Synagogue built.
- 1903
  - Chamber of Commerce founded.
  - YMCA built.
- 1907 – Beaumont Fair (later South Texas State Fair) begins.
- 1910 – Population: 20,640.
- 1913 – Port Arthur-Beaumont Interurban Railway begins operating.
- 1916 – River channel dug.
- 1917 – National Association for the Advancement of Colored People branch organized.
- 1918 – Rio Theatre in business.
- 1919 – "City-manager and commission form of government" adopted.
- 1920 – Population: 40,422.
- 1923 – Tyrrell Public Library founded.
- 1924 – KFDM radio begins broadcasting.
- 1925
  - November: More oil discovered at Spindletop.
  - Gulf States Utilities Company in business.
- 1927
  - "30-foot ship canal" dug.
  - Jefferson Theatre in business.
- 1930
  - "32-foot channel" dug for ships.
  - Beaumont Little Theater built.
  - Population: 57,732.
- 1932 – Jefferson County Courthouse built.
- 1936 – Beauxart Gardens housing for urban poor created near Beaumont (approximate date).
- 1943 – June: Beaumont race riot of 1943.
- 1943–1944 – Beaumont served as a stand-in for Paris, France for Royal Air Force airmen cadets flying on frequent training missions from their base in Terrell, Texas.
- 1950 – Population: 94,014.
- 1955 – KFDM-TV (television) begins broadcasting.
- 1961 – KBMT-TV (television) begins broadcasting.
- 1966 – Roman Catholic Diocese of Beaumont established.
- 1967 – Beaumont Heritage Society formed.
- 1983 – McFaddin–Ward House museum established.
- 1987 – Texas Energy Museum established.
- 1991 – Southeast Texas Food Bank established.
- 1998 – City website online (approximate date).

== 21st century ==
- 2007 – Becky Ames becomes mayor.
- 2010 – Population: city 118,296; megaregion 19,728,244.
- 2013 – Randy Weber becomes U.S. representative for Texas's 14th congressional district.

== See also ==
- Beaumont history
- List of mayors of Beaumont, Texas
- National Register of Historic Places listings in Jefferson County, Texas
- Timelines of other cities in the Southeast Texas area of Texas: Austin, Houston, Pasadena

== Bibliography ==
- "Beaumont". Texas State Gazetteer and Business Directory. St. Louis: R.L. Polk & Co. 1884.
- "Beaumont". Texas State Gazetteer and Business Directory. Detroit: R.L. Polk & Co. 1890.
- Ellis A. Davis; Edwin H. Grobe, eds. (1926). "(Beaumont)". New Encyclopedia of Texas. Dallas: Texas Development Bureau. pp. 63–66. circa 1926?
- Federal Writers' Project (1939). Beaumont: A Guide to the City and Its Environs. American Guide Series. OCLC 1386509.
- Federal Writers' Project (1940), "Beaumont", Texas: A Guide to the Lone Star State, American Guide Series, New York: Hastings House, hdl:2027/mdp.39015002677667 – via HathiTrust
- James Anthony Clark and Michel T. Halbouty (1952). Spindletop. Random HOuse. OCLC 61752539.
- Paul E. Isaac. "Municipal Reform in Beaumont, Texas, 1902–1909." Southwestern Historical Quarterly 78, 1975
- W. T. Block, ed. (1980). Emerald of the Neches: The Chronicles of Beaumont from Reconstruction to Spindletop. Nederland. OCLC 7300003.
- Ory Mazar Nergal, ed. (1980), "Beaumont, TX", Encyclopedia of American Cities, New York: E.P. Dutton, OL 4120668M
- John H. Walker and Gwendolyn Wingate (1981). Beaumont, a Pictorial History. Donning Company. ISBN 089865159X.
- Judith Walker Linsley and Ellen Walker Rienstra (1982). Beaumont: A Chronicle of Promise. Windsor. ISBN 0897810538.
- William T. Faucett (2005). "Shipbuilding in Beaumont during World War II". Texas Gulf Historical and Biographical Record. 41. Texas Gulf Historical Society. ISSN 0563-2897.
- Robert L. Schaadt (2006). "Business of Beaumont Prior to 1880". Texas Gulf Historical and Biographical Record. 42.
- "Banking in Beaumont 1960–2006". Texas Gulf Historical and Biographical Record. 43. November 2007.
- Rob Blain (2014). Early Beaumont. Images of America. Arcadia. ISBN 978-1-4396-4625-0.
- David G. McComb (2015). "Spindletop and Beaumont". The City in Texas: a History. University of Texas Press. pp. 157+. ISBN 978-0-292-76746-1.
