= Harris County Flood Control District =

Government agency to mitigate flooding in Harris County, Texas, USA

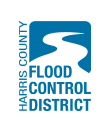

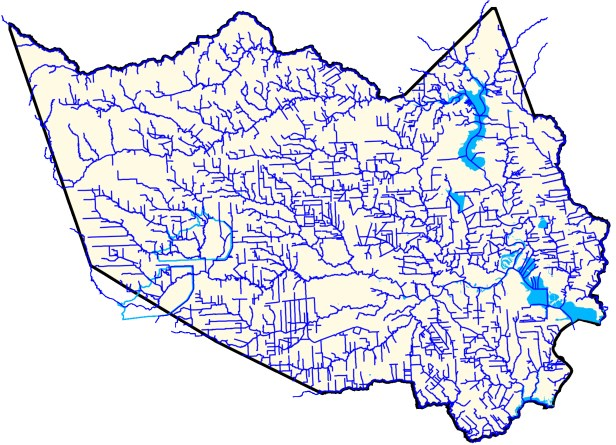
- Abbreviation: HCFCD
- Formation: 1937
- Founder: Texas Legislature
- Type: Special Purpose District
- Legal status: Active
- Purpose: Manage Flood Control in Harris County
- Headquarters: 9900 Northwest Freeway, 77092
- Location: Harris County, TX
- Region served: Southeast Texas
- Budget: $154.6M (2015)
- Revenue: Tax Rate of $0.027 per $100 Value
- Staff: 380 (2015)
- Website: www.hcfcd.org

The Harris County Flood Control District (HCFCD) is a government agency that was established to reduce the effects of flooding in Harris County, Texas, United States. The flood control district has its headquarters in Houston.

After destructive floods occurred in 1929 and 1935, residents of Harris County advocated for relief of flooding issues. The 45th Texas Legislature established the flood district on April 23, 1937, and the Harris County Commissioners Court was designated as the district's governing body.

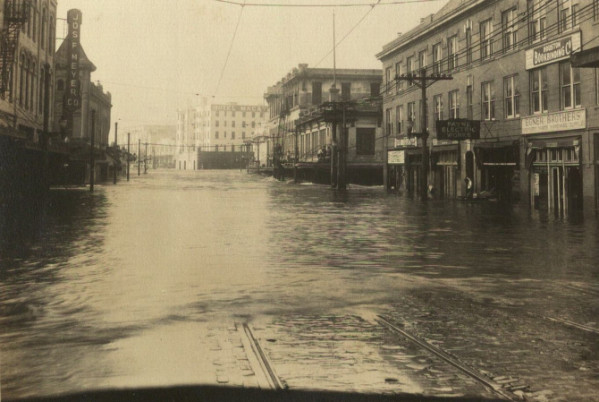
Flood on Franklin Avenue, Houston, 1935, which was a catalyst for the formation of the HCFCD

== Magnolia Bridge ==
The Magnolia Bridge was found responsible for the devastating flooding in 1935.
