= Universidad Europea de Canarias =

European University of the Canary Islands
- Universidad Europea de Canarias
- Type: Private
- Established: 2012
- Location: La Orotava, Canary Islands, Spain
- Website: Official website

The Universidad Europea de Canarias (in English: European University of the Canary Islands) also known as the UEC, is the first private higher education institution in the Canary Islands (Spain). It began its activity in October 2012, having its headquarters in the municipality of La Orotava (Tenerife).

== Teaching ==
The university started its career in 2012 offering five degrees: (Business Management and Creation, Marketing and Business Management, International Management of Tourism and Leisure Companies, Advertising Communication, and Fundamentals of Architecture) and three Masters (MBA-Master in Business Administration, Renewable Energies, and Emergencies, Emergencies and Critical Nursing).
