= European University of Lisbon =

European University at Lisbon
- Universidade Europeia em Lisboa (UEL)
- Type: Private, for-profit
- Established: 1962; 64 years ago
- Rector: Hélia Gonçalves Pereira
- Students: 2,300
- Location: Lisbon, Portugal; 38.70725°N 9.152444°W
- Campus: Lisbon - three campuses: -QT. BOM NOME | (Estrada da Correia, 53 - Carnide); -SANTOS | (Avenida Dom Carlos I, 4 - downtown) -LISPOLIS | (Rua Laura Ayres, 4 - Carnide-Lumiar)
- Colours: Black, Maroon, and White
- Website: europeia.pt
- Location in Lisbon European University of Lisbon (Portugal)

The European University (Portuguese: Universidade Europeia, abbr.: UE), also known as the European University of Lisbon and the European University at Lisbon (Portuguese: Universidade Europeia em Lisboa, abbr.: UEL) is a private university in Lisbon, Portugal.

The school was owned by Laureate Education, Inc., is now part of ENSILIS and has 2,300 students.

== History ==
Founded in 1962 as Higher Institute of Administration and Languages (ISLA), the school was purchased in 2011. In 2013, Higher Institute of Administration and Languages (ISLA) later changed its name to Universidade Europeia de Lisboa. In 2018, Universidade Europeia was acquired by PERMIRA (https://www.permira.com).

During 2010/2011 the University has adapted almost all the teachings it offers to the European Higher Education Area.

=== Rectors ===
From	To	Rector
2020	present	Hélia Gonçalves Pereira
2018	2020	António Pedro Barbas Homem
2013	2015	Tawfiq Rkibi
2015	Present	João Manuel de Frias Viegas Proença
