= Le Cordon Bleu Institute of Culinary Arts in Pittsburgh =

Cook school in Pittsburgh, Pennsylvania

Coordinates: 40.4428°N 79.9993°W

- Type: Private
- Active: 1986–2012
- President: William Hunt
- Location: Pittsburgh, Pennsylvania, USA
- Website: www.chefs.edu/pittsburgh

Le Cordon Bleu (LCB) Institute of Culinary Arts in Pittsburgh was a cooking school in Pittsburgh, Pennsylvania, operating from 1986 to 2012. The institute offered a variety of specialized culinary degrees.

== History ==
LCB Pittsburgh was originally instituted as a branch campus of The Sawyer School. The Pennsylvania Institute of Culinary Arts obtained the campus in 1990 and subsequently earned an independent accreditation by the Accrediting Commission of Career Schools and Colleges. In early 2002, Pennsylvania Culinary Institute became a partner with the Le Cordon Bleu Schools in North America in order to offer Le Cordon Bleu culinary programs.

On January 18, 2011, LCB Pittsburgh announced that it would no longer be accepting students, as the school was to close. The closure was the result of a combination of events, including the end of the school's lease and political pressure by the Obama administration and Senate Democrats on Career Education Corporation as a for-profit school. (The Department of Education's proposed "gainful employment" rule would deny federal funding to schools with graduates facing high proportions of debt related to their expected salaries.) Current students were allowed to finish their programs before the school closed its doors at the end of 2012.

== Programs ==
LCB Pittsburgh had four culinary areas of study:

- Le Cordon Bleu Culinary Arts
- Le Cordon Bleu Pâtisserie & Baking
- Le Cordon Bleu Hospitality and Restaurant Management
- Le Cordon Bleu Culinary Techniques

LCB Pittsburgh awarded Associate of Specialized Technology degrees in the first three programs and a diploma in Le Cordon Bleu Culinary Techniques.

== Campus ==
LCB Pittsburgh provided industry-style kitchens for student training. The facilities included a skill development kitchen; a stock, soup and sauce kitchen; a meat and poultry kitchen; a seafood/charcuterie kitchen; a pastry kitchen; a garde manger/classical/international cuisine kitchen; and multipurpose kitchens. The pâtisserie and baking kitchens included an American-style bakery kitchen, artisan bread kitchen, European-style pastry kitchen, cold and frozen dessert specialty kitchen, and a chocolate, candy and artistic sculpturing kitchen.
