= Les Roches Marbella International School of Hotel Management =

Hospitality school in Marbella, Spain

Les Roches Global Hospitality - Marbella, Spain
- Motto: It's not just a school—it's a way of life.
- Type: For-profit
- Established: 1995
- Parent institution: Les Roches
- Director: Jose Emmanuel Soler (campus)
- Academic staff: 20 (2022)
- Students: 1,200 (2021)
- Location: Marbella, Spain; 36°30′19.76″N 4°56′29.29″W
- Campus: Satellite
- Language: English
- Website: lesroches.edu/es/campus/marbella/

Les Roches Global Hospitality Education - Marbella, Spain is a satellite campus of the Swiss university Les Roches International School of Hotel Management and is located in the town of Marbella in Spain's Costa del Sol region. The campus, which focuses on luxury hotel management, was established in 1995 and offers a Bachelor of Business Administration, postgraduate degree, master's degree, and an executive master's degree in global/international hospitality management and a Master's in marketing and management for luxury tourism. In 2002, Les Roches became a member of the Laureate Education group and in 2004 became the first school in Spain to receive accreditation from the New England Association of Schools & Colleges. In 2016, Les Roches was acquired by Eurazeo and placed under the Sommet Education umbrella.

== Academics ==
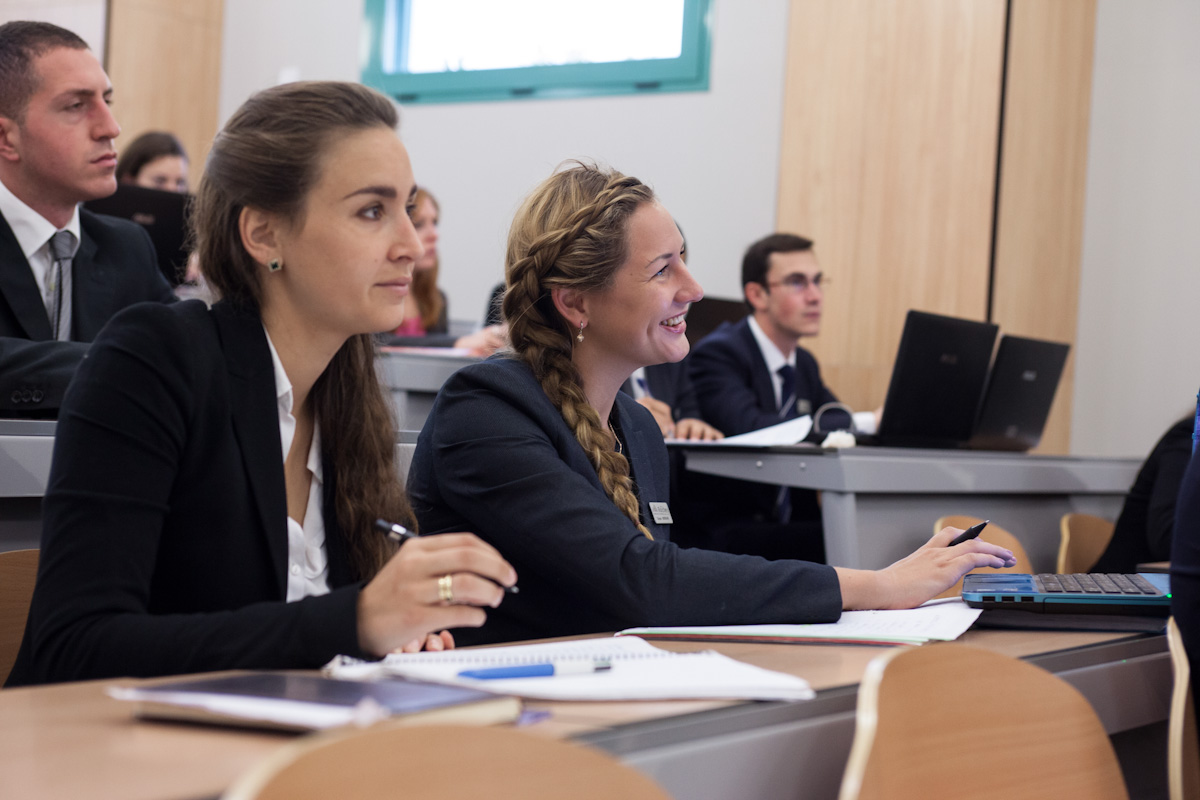
Les Roches students in Marbella

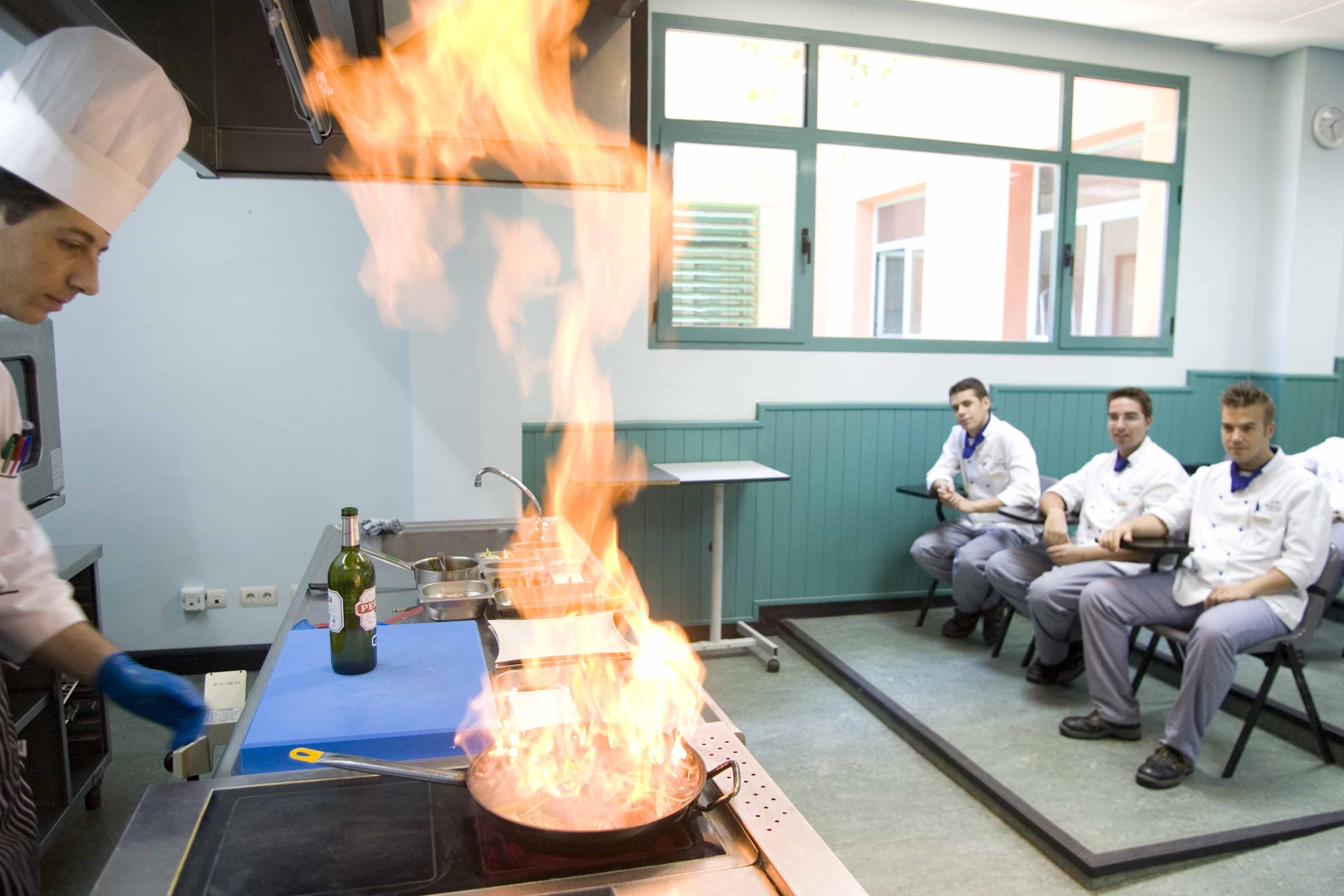
Students in a craft demonstration

Les Roches teaches that understanding the roles and responsibilities of employees helps a manager manage more effectively. As such, in additional to their hospitality management classwork, students work as "floor cleaners, cooks, waiters, [and] chefs." The Marbella campus offers undergraduate, master's, and postgraduate degrees in global/international hospitality management, as well as a master's degree in marketing and management for luxury tourism. More recently, Les Roches has introduced an executive postgraduate diploma program in international hotel management which fast-tracks students already working full-time in the industry. Specialisations available on the Marbella campus are: resort development and management, entrepreneurship, digital marketing strategies, and financial performance management. All programs are accredited by the New England Commission of Higher Education.

Undergraduates spend their first two semesters experiencing different roles while on campus. Their third semester is spent at an affiliate hotel (such as the Ritz-Carlton and the Mandarin Oriental) anywhere in the world so they can gain hands-on experience in a real-life setting. The following semester is spent in Marbella learning hotel operations before again departing for an internship. The last two semesters of the three-and-a-half-year program are spent studying business, human resources, marketing, and strategy, among other relevant subjects. The postgraduate degree, which is largely similar in structure to the undergraduate program, requires one internship semester to complete the program. Les Roches is an affiliated member of the World Tourism Organization and follows its Global Code of Ethics for Tourism framework.

The Marbella campus has a demo room with up-to-date technologies for students to study. Managers must be able to make decisions based on sustainability, durability, and availability for renovations such as a floor "made of recycled cork, which is more resistant" or a "full-body dryer that saves resources by not spending so much water, towels, soap, and energy." Students also learn to be flexible when given a very specific business model, such as a hotel that uses "only local produce... sourced from within 100km." In December 2020, the Spark Innovation Sphere was introduced to campus to increase collaborative projects and access to industry professionals; the construction also included the business incubator space where innovation can occur.

Prior to the COVID-19 pandemic, the average number of job offers a student received upon graduation was five and has since dropped to three. Post-university job placement is nearly 100%. Because the program stresses the importance of soft skills such as empathy and cultural sensitivity, Les Roches students have significant experience with customer service, which attracts employers "such as hotels, tourism companies, banks, technology or luxury companies."

== Student life ==
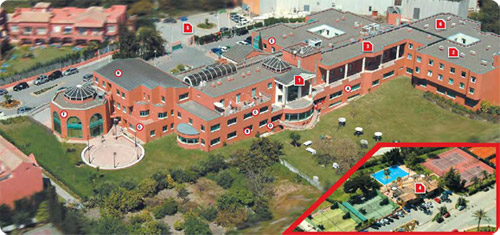
Aerial view of campus

Students are split into the red, blue, green, or purple houses that becomes their cohort and "in which the different nationalities have a balanced representation." In 2022, the Marbella campus enrolled students from more than 91 countries. Les Roches students adhere to a strict schedule and dress code, and must demonstrate sufficient housekeeping of their personal space, including ensuring the bed has been made. Students live on campus for their first year and are taught to manage stress and avoid burnout. In addition to coursework, including hands-on tutorials, students have extracurricular options including sports and gastronomic clubs.

== Campus ==
The Marbella campus opened in 1995 in a residential area of the Golden Mile District. It has undergone several expansions and renovations over the years and is currently host to one on-campus hotel, one off-campus hotel, and four restaurants of varying quality, all of which provide hands-on training for students. On campus, there is a demo kitchen, bar, and a 170-person auditorium.

== Awards and rankings ==
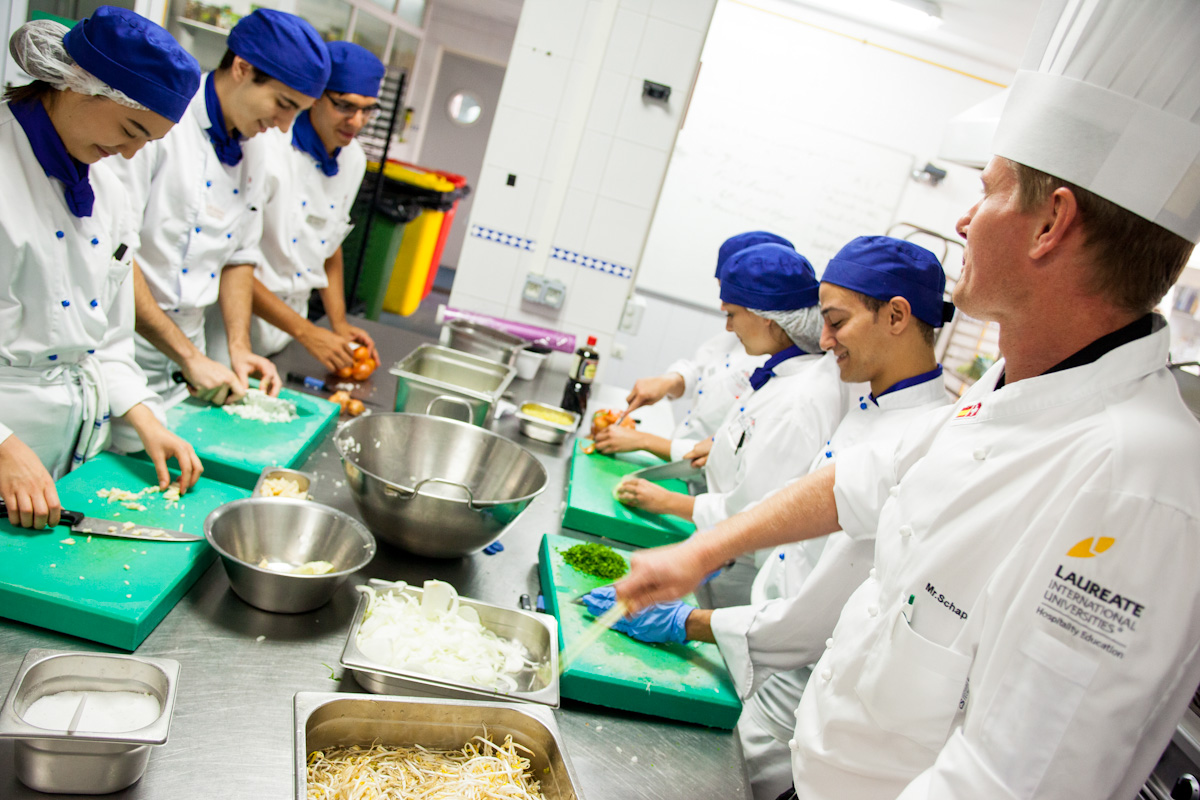
Students in the experiential learning kitchen

In 2014, Les Roches Marbella was honoured with the Excellence in Training Award from the Andalucía Excellence Awards and in 2016 received a gold star from the Institute for Professional Excellence. QS World University Rankings recognised Les Roches Marbella as the fourth best hospitality university in the world in 2017 and the second best for its reputation amongst employers. They were awarded a bronze medal by the Red Cross for their "effort and commitment to the institution" and a Gold Medal for Merit from the European Association for Economy and Competitiveness (EAEC) for its "promot[ion of] good business development within the European framework." At the first ever Educational Excellence Awards, Les Roches Marbella was given the Special Award for the Best International Hotel School and was named the best international management school, tourism school, and hotel school, in addition to the best trajectory in international tourism school, and best academic offerings in international school of tourism. The following year, the nonprofit Awakening Without Violence recognised it for its dedication to the community and to the betterment of Marbella as a whole. In 2019, the EAEC gave them the European Business Quality Award and the Hotel Technology Institute gave them its Educational Institution Award. In 2020, QS named it second in the employability category and the third best institution in management of the hospitality and leisure industry; in 2021, they were acknowledged as the top hospitality and leisure management university in Spain. They also placed in the top three best institutions in management of hospitality and leisure industry worldwide.
