= Les Roches International School of Hotel Management =

Private hospitality school in Switzerland

Les Roches Global Hospitality Education
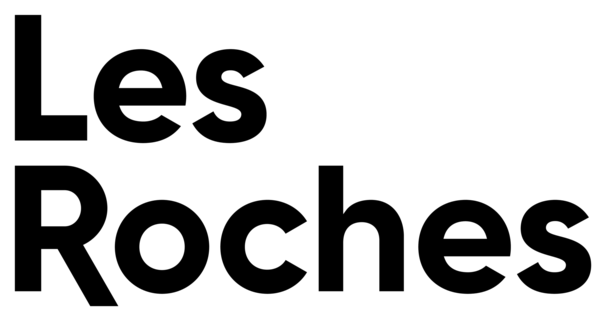
- Les Roches Crans Montana
- Former name: Les Roches International School of Hotel Management
- Motto: It's not just a school, it's a way of life
- Type: Private
- Established: 1954; 72 years ago
- CEO: Carlos Díez de la Lastra
- Students: 1984 (August 2024)
- Location: Bluche, Rte des Moulinettes 2, Crans-Montana, Sierre District, Valais, Switzerland; 46.3089°N 7.4972°E
- Campus: Les Roches, CH
- Website: www.lesroches.edu
- Location within Switzerland

Les Roches is a private hospitality school owned by Eurazeo and located in the canton of Valais, Switzerland.

== History ==
Les Roches is a hospitality school founded in 1979. Approximately 1,118 students from 68 countries attend every semester, with an additional 150 students on internship around the world at any given time.

The École des Roches, an international boarding school for young people, was founded in 1954 by two brothers; Marcel and Jean-Pierre Clivaz. In 1979, "Les Roches International School" became “Les Roches Hotel and Tourism School". It was the first hospitality school in Switzerland to offer all courses in English. In 2016 they became Les Roches Global Hospitality Education.

The main campus was destroyed by a fire in April 1985. This obliged the school to house students and facilities in three hotels. In June 1987, the school moved into its new buildings. In November 2000, Les Roches became part of the group now known as Laureate Education Inc. who also manages Glion Institute of Higher Education.

It is now part of the Eurazeo portfolio and was part of the purchase of Sommet Education in June 2016.

The school maintains close ties with the hotel and tourism industry through a panel of advisors from four major hotel chains.

== Academic programs ==
The school offers a range of undergraduate, graduate and MBA courses in the field of hospitality management. Les Roches has campuses in Switzerland and Spain.

== Accreditation ==
Les Roches Global Hospitality Education is accredited by the New England Commission of Higher Education (formerly the Commission on Institutions of Higher Education of the New England Association of Schools and Colleges, Inc.).

Les Roches Jin Jiang is also accredited by the Shanghai Education Evaluation Association (SEEA).

Les Roches Global Hospitality Education is a member of AACSB and EuroCHRIE. The institution is also an affiliate member of the UNWTO.

== Rankings ==
In 2021, education company Quacquarelli Symonds (QS) ranked Les Roches among the world's top three institutions for employer reputation in hospitality and leisure management. In the rankings, which included 50 top hospitality institutions from around the world, Les Roches was also ranked among the top three Swiss institutions and among the top five institutions globally.

== See also ==
- Les Roches Jin Jiang International Hotel Management College
- Les Roches Marbella International School of Hotel Management
- List of Hospitality Management Schools in Switzerland
