= Texas Culinary Academy =

Private school in Austin, Texas, USA

Le Cordon Bleu of Culinary Arts in Austin
- Type: Private, For Profit
- Active: 1981–2017
- President: Steve Smith
- Faculty: 49
- Students: 894
- Location: 11400 Burnett Road, Suite 2100, Austin, Texas, United States; 30.401242°N 97.721685°W
- Campus: Urban
- Website: http://www.chefs.edu/Austin

Le Cordon Bleu of Culinary Arts in Austin (LCB-Austin) was a private school located in The Domain, a 235-acre (0.95 km^{2}), multi-use park in Austin, Texas. The cooking school was affiliated with Le Cordon Bleu Schools North America.

Originally named Le Chef College of Hospitality Careers, Ronald F. Boston started the school as a chef-apprenticeship program in 1981. In 1999, the school was renamed Texas Culinary Academy. TCA was acquired by Career Education Corporation in August 2001.

LCB-Austin operated within a 52,000-square-foot (4,831.0 m^{2}) facility that contained six 2,000-square-foot (185.8 m^{2}) labs, classrooms, a student library, a computer lab, a restaurant, a cafe and a retail store. Also located within the facility was a 100-seat demonstration kitchen.

The school operated two on-campus restaurants. Ventana, a 100-seat restaurant which served classical French cuisine, opened in late 2002, and The Bleu River Grille, a casual coffee and sandwich shop.

LCB-Austin offered an Associate of Applied Science Degree in Le Cordon Bleu Culinary Arts and certificates in Le Cordon Bleu Pâtisserie & Baking and Le Cordon Bleu Culinary Arts.
