= Maurits van Rooijen =

Dutch historian

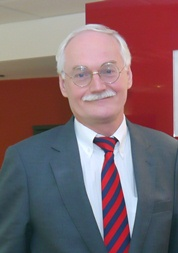
- Born: 1956 (age 69–70); Breda, Netherlands
- Education: Utrecht University
- Occupations: Social and economic historian; Academic administrator
- Employer: Global University Systems
- Title: Rector of London School of Business and Finance
- Term: 2012-

Maurits van Rooijen (born 1956) is a Dutch socio-economic historian and geographer. His research has concentrated on green urbanisation and re-interpreting garden city principles. In recent publications he has promoted the concept of the "Global Knowledge City" arguing that in "the 21st century besides the need to blend urbanisation with agriculture and manufacturing (the original garden city mission), global knowledge innovation should be at the core of sustainable urbanisation."

In 2013 he was awarded the prize for EAIE Constance Meldrum Award for Vision & Leadership. Since 2012, he has been the CEO & Rector of the London School of Business and Finance (LSBF).

== Early years ==
Born in Breda, Netherlands in 1956, Maurits van Rooijen attended the Onze-Lieve-Vrouwe lyceum (gymnasium beta) and studied at Utrecht University. In parallel to his postgraduate in Social and Economic History degree, he also did the postgraduate programme in Sociology for Built Environment. He was lecturer/researcher at his alma mater in Urban Studies and obtained his doctorate in Geography for research about the roots and prospects of green urbanisation, on which he wrote various publications. He taught by invitation for extended periods at several universities worldwide, such as University of Pennsylvania, Cambridge University, University of Hull, University College London, Bergen University Norway, Leibniz University Hannover, Vienna University of Technology, and has held professorships at Guangdong University of Foreign Studies, Beijing Union University, Victoria University, Australia, Nyenrode Business University.

== Academic positions ==
After working at the Erasmus University Rotterdam in various senior administrative roles (1987-1993), van Rooijen moved to the University of Westminster, London where worked from 1993 to 2009. At Westminster, he was the founding Director for International Education from 1993 and then, from 2003, the Executive Vice-President for International and Institutional Development, reporting directly to the Vice-Chancellor, and a member of the university executive board and academic council.

From 2009 to 2012 van Rooijen was Rector Magnificus and CEO of Nyenrode Business University.

Van Rooijen became Rector and CEO of the London School of Business and Finance (LSBF), a private for-profit business school based in London, in 2012. He was appointed to expand innovation of all schools belonging to the LSBF Group and St Patrick's College, London which like the LSBF Group, is owned by Global University Systems. Since 2013 he has been Academic CEO of Global University Systems, Acting Rector of GISMA Business School in Germany (also owned by Global University Systems) and remains the CEO and Rector of London School of Business and Finance. In addition to these roles, van Rooijen became Rector of University of Applied Sciences Europe in September 2019

== International organisations ==
From 2009-2012 he was chairman of the Euro-Mediterranean University of Slovenia, and was, from 2008 until 2016, president of the Compostela Group of Universities, He has also been co-chairman of the World Association for Cooperative Education, a Boston-based organization dedicated to promoting work-integrated and experiential learning, since 2008, and was vice-president of the European Access Network, a London-based organization encouraging access to higher education for underrepresented groups, for over 15 years. He is an associate of Global Higher Education Consultants. Since 2015, van Rooijen has been Chairman of the High Level Council of GaragErasmus, which stimulates entrepreneurship under new generations of Europe

== Publications ==
=== Sustainable urbanisation ===
- De Groene Stad(The Green City), (SDU: The Hague 1984)
- Open Space, Urban Planning and the Evolution of the Green City, in: R.Freestone,
- Garden Cities for the 21st century?(KDU: Kobe 2001) With Takahito Saiki and Robert Freestone
- The Global Knowledge Cities Concept, in: Beliefs and values (Vol. 3, No. 1, 2011) With A. de Rooij

=== Public and applied history ===
- Toegepaste Geschiedenis(SDU: The Hague 1994)

=== Innovation and internationalisation of higher education ===
- Co-operative Education in Europe (CGU 2002)
- The Multinational University With David Jones and Stephen Adam(Occasional Papers series, EAIE 2003)
- Marketing your institution internationally (Professional Development series, EAIE 2008)
- International Strategic Planning, in: EUA/ACA Handbook Internationalisation of European HigherEducation (Raabe: Berlin 2008)
- Social, Political an Industrial Drivers of Higher Education, in: Joy Higgs et al., Education for Future Practice (Sense: Rotterdam, 2010) With Ian Goulter
- Leading in Higher Education, The Oxford Handbook of Higher Education Systems and University Management (Oxford University Press, 2019)
- From International to Multinational Universities, Internationalisation of Higher Education
- Extrapreneurs: A More Sensible Form of Entrepreneurship? (European Business Review, 2017)
