= London School of Business and Finance =

Private for-profit business and finance school, London

Coordinates: 51.5085°N 0.0782°W

- Type: Private business school
- Established: 2003
- Rector: Maurits van Rooijen
- Location: Tower Hill, London, UK
- Campus: Urban
- Owner: Global University Systems
- Website: lsbf.org.uk lsbf.edu.sg

The London School of Business and Finance (informally LSBF) is a private business school in the United Kingdom, owned by the for-profit education corporate group Global University Systems. It was founded in 2003 by the entrepreneur Aaron Etingen. By 2015 it had become one of England's largest private colleges.

The school's main base is in London, with sites in Tower Hill and Holborn. It also has a branch in Singapore. It offers Master's degree programmes in management, finance and marketing; executive and corporate short courses; and training for the ACCA and AAT examinations. It does not have degree-awarding powers of its own. All degrees are awarded by external institutions.

== History ==
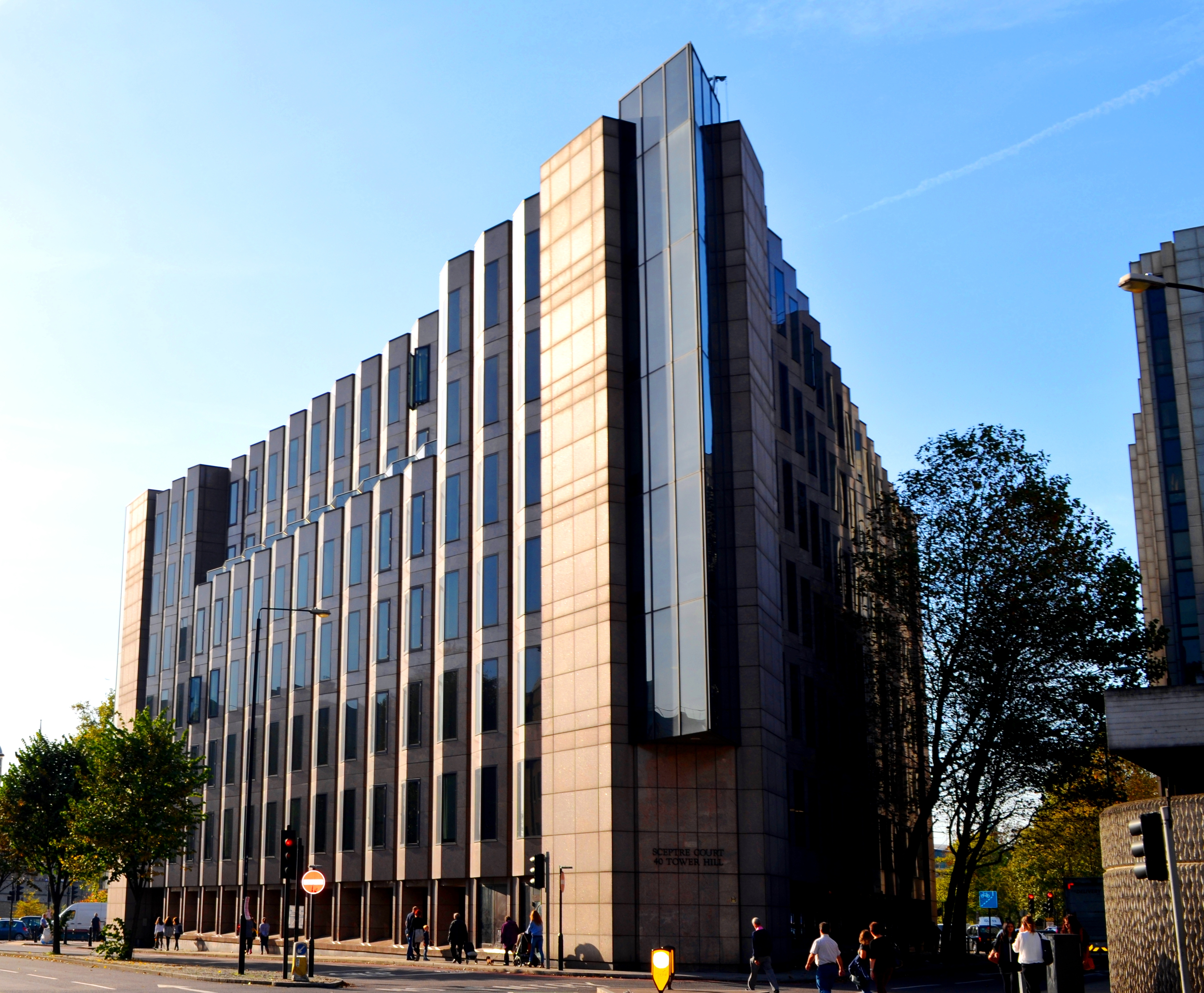
LSBF's Sceptre Court campus in Tower Hill, London

The London School of Business and Finance was founded in 2003 by the British entrepreneur, Aaron Etingen (also known as Arkady Etingen). He was born in Russia, raised in Israel, and moved to the UK at age 18 to study business and finance. According to 2010 interviews with Etingen in City A.M. and the New York Times, LSBF began in an attic on Hyde Park Corner with "two rooms and four students" taking accounting courses. The school gradually expanded its portfolio of programmes over the years. By 2010, it had established two further UK branches in Birmingham and Manchester and was offering MBAs and MScs in finance and marketing and a Masters in international business (all awarded and validated by external institutions), as well as executive and professional training with a strong emphasis on finance.

In March 2010 LSBF launched an MBA (at the time externally validated and awarded by the University of Wales) which it billed as capable of completion in as little as eight weekends via eight intensive core modules delivered on campus and online. In October of that year, LSBF also launched a "Global MBA" on Facebook, with the eight intensive modules broken down into smaller units. Students could take the modules for free, paying only if they chose to take the examinations. LSBF established further UK institutions (collectively known as the LSBF Group) in 2011 and that same year opened branches in Toronto and Singapore. The Ontario Ministry of Training, Colleges and Universities issued a restraining order against the Toronto branch in April 2013 ordering it to halt teaching and stop charging for and advertising a number of its vocational programmes, including Higher National Diplomas. A spokesman for LSBF Canada, which at the time (October 2013) was fighting the decision in the Canadian courts, described the restraining order as "unfair" and said that the institution had "always operated lawfully in Ontario". As of 2016, the former official website for the Toronto branch (lsbf.ca) carried the name "Innovative Skills Academy" and was labelled "under construction". As of 2018, the lsbf.ca domain redirects to Toronto School of Management, a career college launched in 2017 by LSBF's owners, Global University Systems.

According to The Guardian, after the market reforms of post-secondary education introduced by UK higher education minister David Willetts in 2011, LSBF and its subsidiaries experienced rapid expansion. St Patrick's College, London was also describing itself as "a member of the LSBF Group" in 2012 after it was bought by Etingen's company Interactive World Wide Limited. Together, LSBF and St Patrick's grew from 50 government-funded students in 2011 to approximately 6,000 over the next two years. In 2013 LSBF and St Patrick's collectively netted £13.5m in tuition fee payments, with their students receiving a total of £49m in government loans and grants. In April 2013, LSBF was one of 116 UK businesses to receive the Queen's Award for Enterprise for achievements in international trade.

Over the years LSBF's degrees have been awarded and validated by a number of UK and European universities. However, by 2014 it had lost all its degree-validating UK university partners, retaining only the European-based Università telematica internazionale Uninettuno and Grenoble Graduate School of Business. In May 2014, The Guardian reported LSBF lecturer's claims that the institution "is chaotically organised, lacks basic teaching resources and maintains disruptive students on its books to keep the income they generate flowing in". In June 2014, the UK Home Office suspended LSBF's Tier 4 licence to sponsor non-European Union students for study or work visas, due to "numerous, broader failings" in respect of LSBF's sponsorship duties, an allegation which the LSBF denied. The licence was reinstated on review a few months later, but suspended again in September 2015. The UK Home Office formally revoked LSBF's permission to recruit non-EU students in January 2016. As a result, 350 students were told they had to leave the UK by the end of March 2016. The college said students would be able to complete their courses either by studying a compressed course or transferring to affiliated institutions in France or Spain.

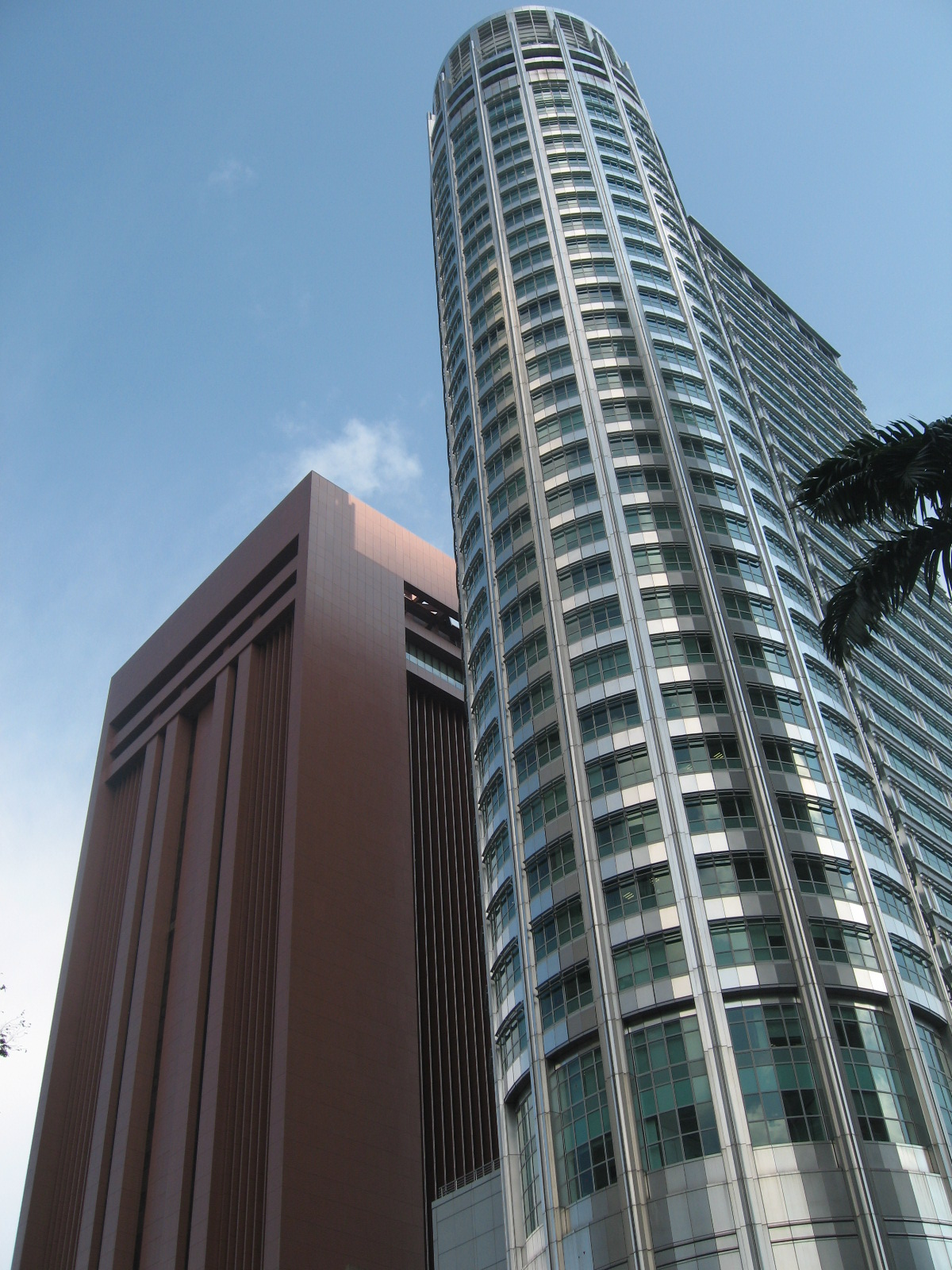
Springleaf Tower (right), site of LSBF Singapore's main campus

LSBF's parent company Global University Systems had acquired London's University of Law in June 2015 and a few months later announced plans for a two-year restructuring process of the LSBF Group set to begin in mid-2016. According to John Cox, director of organisational development at GUS, the plan involves LSBF coming under a new vocational entity offering only diploma courses, short courses and corporate training products. The vocational courses delivered by St Patrick's College and the Birmingham-based Finance Business Training (also owned by GUS) would also come under this division. The University of Law would become sole provider of academic qualifications and professional qualifications, including the master's degrees previously offered by the LSBF Group. However, as of 2019 LSBF was still offering master's degrees awarded by the International Telematic University and Geneva Business School. There were no programmes provided or validated by the University of Law.

== Campuses and locations ==
LSBF is based in central London with sites in Tower Hill and Holborn. The head office and main campus is at Sceptre Court in Tower Hill. The school also has an international branch in Singapore. The main campus and headquarters of LSBF Singapore are located in the GB Building in the central business district of Singapore, with further classrooms in nearby Cecil Street.

== Organization and administration ==
=== Ownership ===
LSBF and the institutions of the LSBF Group are owned by Global University Systems (GUS), a private limited company registered in The Netherlands. GUS also owns St Patrick's College, London, University Canada West, GISMA Business School in Germany, and London's University of Law as well as the e-learning company InterActive Pro and several other educational brands.

=== Governance ===
Maurits van Rooijen was appointed CEO and rector of LSBF in 2012. He also serves as the Chief Academic Officer of Global University Systems. In 2017 Rathakrishnan Govind was named global CEO of LSBF with Maurits van Rooijen remaining as LSBF's rector.

LSBF's patron is Prince Michael of Kent.

== Academics ==
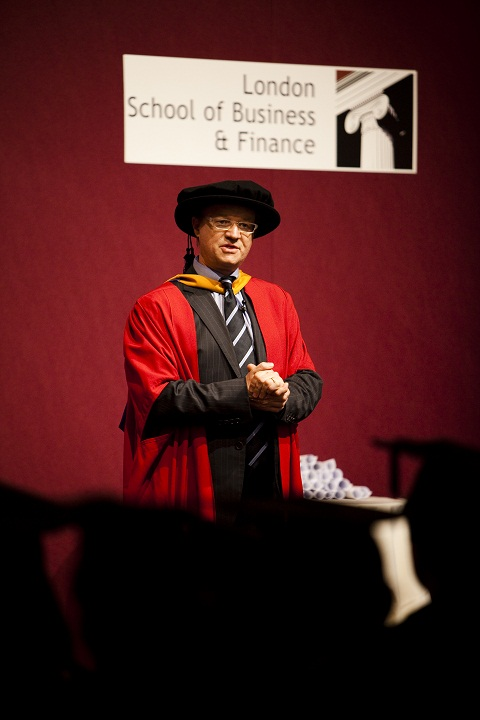
Former vice-rector James Kirkbride at the 2011 Summer graduation ceremony

=== Programmes ===
LSBF does not have degree-awarding or diploma awarding powers in the UK. All degree-level programmes offered at the London campuses are validated and awarded by external institutions. As of 2018 the school offers courses in a range of business and finance subjects, including several MBAs validated and awarded by the Università telematica internazionale UniNettuno. It also offers executive and corporate training courses and preparation for the ACCA and the AAT examinations. The courses are delivered using a range of full-time and part-time, blended and online modes. Its online programmes are delivered via an e-learning platform managed by InterActive Pro, another Global University Systems subsidiary. Since November 2016, LSBF has been accredited as a short course provider in executive education by the British Accreditation Council. Following the revocation of its visa sponsor licence by the UK government in January 2016, it cannot offer long-term courses or work placement to non-European Union students.

The Singapore branch is registered with the Singapore government's Committee for Private Education and offers its own diplomas in various areas of business and finance as well as several undergraduate and post-graduate degrees delivered and validated by external institutions which include the University of Greenwich and Concordia University Chicago. The Belt and Road Multi-Cultural Studies Centre, which opened at LSBF Singapore in 2017, offers additional undergraduate degrees in Chinese language and literature and Chinese business studies delivered and awarded by the Overseas Education College of Xiamen University. Like its London counterpart, LSBF Singapore also offers language and executive education courses and preparation for the ACCA examinations.

=== QAA assessments ===
LSBF and its associated Financial and Business Training division underwent an investigation and subsequent reviews in 2012 by the UK's Quality Assurance Agency for Higher Education (QAA) amid concerns about student recruitment and completion rates on programmes which at the time were validated by the University of Wales. The initial investigation made a number of recommendations for improvements including that LSBF draw up and submit an action plan to address the issues identified.

LSBF's last assessment by the QAA took place in March 2015 and concluded that:

- The maintenance of the academic standards of awards offered on behalf of external degree-awarding bodies and other awarding organisations met UK expectations
- The quality of student learning opportunities did not meet UK expectations for Higher National provision but met UK expectations for all other provision
- The enhancement of student learning opportunities did not meet UK expectations.
- The quality of the information about learning opportunities required improvement to meet UK expectations.

In October 2017 the QAA assessment was updated: the quality of information produced about its provision and the enhancement of student learning opportunities were both changed to ‘meets UK expectations’.

The school is no longer reviewed by the QAA because it no longer offers degrees or higher education programmes validated by UK institutions.

== External lectures ==
Former UK Home Secretary and Education Secretary David Blunkett, has conducted interviews with business and political leaders such as a Richard Branson, Deborah Meaden, Sir John Major, and Tony Blair for LSBF's "Great Minds" video series, which began in 2011. Blunkett has also been a part-time lecturer at LSBF. In December 2011, Prince Michael of Kent chaired the inaugural "LSBF HRH Prince Michael of Kent Business Lecture" organized in partnership with the Royal Society of Arts. The guest speaker was former Director-General of the CBI and former Minister of State for Trade and Investment, Lord Digby Jones.

== Notable alumni ==
- Princess Marie-Astrid of Liechtenstein
- Rahul Gupta, former Director of National Drug Control Policy for the United States.

== See also ==
- List of business schools in Europe
