= Sagi =

Sagi (Hebrew: שגיא) is an Israeli male given name, of Hebrew origin, meaning "great, elevated, sublime".

== People ==
=== Given name ===
- Sagi Muki (born 1992), Israeli judoka
- Sagi Hartov (born 1978), Israeli-British cellist
- Sagi Strauss (born 1976), retired football player

=== Surname ===
- Gideon Sagi (born 1939), former member of Knesset
- Teddy Sagi (born 1971), London-based Israeli billionaire businessman
- Tsuri Sagi (1934–2026), Israeli military officer
- Uri Sagi (born 1943), retired IDF general
- Yehoshua Sagi (1933–2021), former member of Knesset

== Places ==
- Sagi, Iran
- Sagi, Pakistan

== See also ==
- Japanese torpedo boat Sagi, two Japanese warships
- Chagi (Sagi), Indian surname
- Sagittarius (disambiguation)
