= Bhatla =

Bhatla, also spelt Bathla, is a surname used by the Hindu and Sikh Khatris of Punjab, as well as Telugu people.

This surname means "soldier" or "warrior." It is likely of Sanskrit origin.

Meaning and Origin

Linguistic Root: The surname is often derived from the Sanskrit word "Bhatta," which means a scholar, learned man, teacher, or respected priest.

Suffix: The ending "la" acts as a diminutive or affectionate suffix commonly found in various Indian regional names.

Notable people with the name include:

- Alisshaa Ohri (maiden name Alisshaa Bathla; born 1986), Indian model and artist
- Ankit Bathla (born 1988), Indian actor
- Neerja Bhatla, Indian gynecologist and obstetrician
