= LSBF Group =

British for-profit education group

The LSBF Group is a UK-based group of private for-profit educational institutions whose "hub" institution is the London School of Business and Finance (LSBF). The group also includes the London College of Contemporary Arts (LCCA) and the LSBF School of English (later rebranded as The Language Gallery). They are all owned by Global University Systems (GUS).

== Background ==
The institutions of the LSBF Group, which describe themselves as "educational partners", are owned by Global University Systems BV, a private limited company based in the Netherlands. The founder, CEO, and majority shareholder of Global University Systems is the Russian-born entrepreneur Aaron Etingen who founded the London School of Business and Finance in 2003.

LSBF Group is one of the largest private education providers in the UK. According to The Guardian, after the market reforms of post-secondary education introduced by UK higher education minister David Willetts, the group expanded rapidly. St Patrick's College, London was also describing itself as "a member of the LSBF Group" in 2012 after it was bought by Etingen's company Interactive World Wide Limited. Together, the London School of Business and Finance and St Patrick's grew from 50 government-funded students in 2011 to approximately 6000 over the next two years. In 2013 LSBF and St Patrick's College collectively netted £13.5m in tuition fee payments, with their students receiving a total of £49m in government loans and grants. None of the LSBF Group's institutions have degree-awarding powers. As of 2016, their degree programs are validated by the Italian private online university Università telematica internazionale UniNettuno or the Paris-based institution École d'Art Maryse Eloy/Mod'Art International, depending on the subject.

In September 2015 the LSBF Group had its license to recruit non-European international students suspended by the UK government. That same month Global Education Systems announced plans for a two-year restructuring process of the group set to begin in mid-2016. According to John Cox, director of organisational development at GUS, the plan involves LSBF and its LCCA division coming under a new vocational entity offering only diploma courses, short courses and corporate training products. The vocational courses delivered by St Patrick's College and the Birmingham-based Finance Business Training would also come under this division. The University of Law would become sole provider of academic qualifications and professional qualifications, including the master's degrees previously offered by the LSBF Group.

== Principal members ==
=== London School of Business and Finance (LSBF) ===
Not to be confused with London Business School or London School of Economics, the London School of Business and Finance was founded in 2003 by Aaron Etingen. It is located in central London with an international branch in Singapore. Formerly, it had additional branches in Manchester and Birmingham (branded as Finance Business Training or FBT) in the UK and in Toronto, Canada. As of 2019 it offered executive and corporate training, several undergraduate and graduate courses including an MBA validated and awarded by the Università telematica internazionale UniNettuno, and preparation for the ACCA, qualifications through its Finance Business Training division.

=== London College of Contemporary Arts (LCCA) ===
Founded in 2011 by Aaron Etingen and the Israeli cellist Sagi Hartov who serves as its dean and director, the college is located in Holborn area of London and shares its campus with the London School of Business and Finance. According to a March 2015 review by the Quality Assurance Agency for Higher Education, LCCA is a school of LSBF, not an independent college. However, the reviewers noted that LCCA's prospectuses and website did not make this clear, and many students were unaware that they were actually enrolled in LSBF which had been presented simply as an "educational partner" of the college. As of 2019, LCCA (including its School of Fashion and Design division) offered continuing professional development and vocational training in various arts-related areas as well as undergraduate and post-graduate degrees delivered and validated by a number of UK and European institutions. It also offers one-to-one sessions with people working in various sectors of the fashion industry and work placement options.

=== LSBF School of English ===
The school began in 2008 as an adjunct to the London School of Business and Finance to provide English-language training for its students. Its original home was in the Bloomsbury area of London, and it subsequently established branches in Manchester and Birmingham in the UK and in Toronto, Canada. By 2013 it was catering to a total of 3,000 students. In 2014 it was re-branded as The Language Gallery. The school offers courses in general English and English for business purposes as well as preparation classes for the IELTS, Cambridge and TOEFL exams. With the acquisition of GISMA Business School by LBSF's parent company Global University Systems in 2013, a further campus was established in Hannover, Germany which provides German-language training and preparatory courses for the TestDaF language proficiency certificates. The Language Gallery's UK branches are accredited by the British Council.
