= IBAT =

The acronym IBAT may refer to:

- Ileal bile acid transporter, a protein also known as SLC10A2;
- Institute of Business Administration and Training in India;
- The Institute of Business and Technology (IBaT) in Dublin, Ireland;
- Interscapular brown adipose tissue, also known as Hibernating gland;
- Instruction Block Address Translation registers in PowerPC microprocessors.
