= CDI College =

For-profit college in Canada

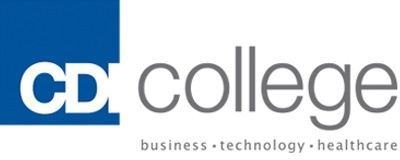
- Type: private, for-profit career college
- Location: Canada (Alberta, British Columbia, Manitoba, Ontario, Quebec)
- Campus: urban
- Owner: Eminata Group
- Website: www.cdicollege.ca

CDI College is a private, for-profit career college in Canada. It offers programs in the business, technology and health care fields. The college has 23 campus locations in five Canadian provinces: six in British Columbia, eight in Alberta, one in Manitoba, four in Ontario and five in Quebec. The school has been owned by the Eminata Group since 2007. A 2022 investigation by CBC reported that some recruiters for CDI College lied to applicants about program accreditation and the post-graduation hiring rates of its students.

== History ==
The now-defunct Corinthian Colleges, Inc. (CCi) purchased CDI Education Corporation in August 2003. CDI had a post-secondary education division of career colleges operating under the brand names of CDI College of Business and Technology and The Institute for Computer Studies. CDI's corporate training division operated under the brand name of CDI Corporation Education Services.

On November 8, 2007, Corinthian completed the sale of substantially all the assets of its corporate training division, CDI Education, for C$19 million (US$16 million) to CrossOff Incorporated. In December 2007, Corinthian re-branded its Ontario campuses as Everest College and sold the remaining campus locations across Canada to the Eminata Group.

== Controversies ==
=== The Province investigation for dubious business practices ===
In March 2012, a two-part investigative feature in the British Columbian paper The Province reported on student complaints and dubious business practices at CDI College and two other Canadian institutions owned by Eminata—University Canada West and Vancouver Career College. In December of that year seven CDI nursing students had their Practice Permits suspended by the College of Licensed Practical Nurses of Alberta. Several Edmonton-based students later filed a lawsuit, claiming that their class activities in the nursing program included wheelchair racing, watching Netflix and learning human anatomy from colouring books. CDI College terminated the LPN program in 2013. They settled the lawsuit in 2018, paying out $1.88 million.

=== UPAC investigation for questionable recruitment practices ===
In November 2020, CDI College was named one of the ten private colleges under investigation for questionable recruitment practices, mainly targeting Indian students. The government of Quebec later suspended processing CAQ applications for CDI College, which are required for foreign students to study in the province.

In December 2020, the college was under investigation by UPAC for financial irregularities.

=== CBC Marketplace investigation for misleading students ===
In December 2022, A CBC Marketplace investigation into CDI College, one of Canada's largest for-profit career colleges, has found a pattern of misleading practices being used to pressure would-be students into signing up for online programs that can cost upward of $20,000.

Marketplace has documented some CDI admissions representatives misleading journalists posing as potential online students on accreditation, salary and job rates after graduation, as well as signing up unsuitable candidates and pressuring students to enroll.
