= Gerald Lynch =

Gerald Lynch may refer to:

- Jerry Lynch (Gerald Thomas Lynch, 1930–2012), American baseball player
- Gerald W. Lynch (1937–2013), American educator of criminal justice
- Gerald J. Lynch (active since 1982), American professor of economics
