= BSBI =

BSBI may refer to:

- Berlin School of Business and Innovation, a for-profit business school in Berlin
- Botanical Society of Britain and Ireland, a scientific society with a head office in Durham
