= Victoria College of Art =

Art school in Victoria, British Columbia, Canada

Coordinates: 48.428°N 123.328°W

- Former names: Northwest Coast Institute of Arts (1974–1976); Victoria College of Art and Design (2008–2009)
- Type: private, non-profit art school
- Established: 1974
- President: Peter Such
- Academic staff: 14
- Address: 1625 Bank Street, Victoria, British Columbia, Canada
- Website: vca.ca

Victoria College of Art (VCA) is a private, non-profit art college located in Victoria, British Columbia, Canada. Founded in 1974 as the Northwest Coast Institute of Arts, the college offers Diploma programs in Fine Arts, Applied Arts Illustration, and Applied Arts Animation. It has no connection whatsoever with Visual College of Art and Design (VCAD) in Vancouver which is owned by the for-profit education company Eminata.

== History ==
Victoria College of Art began its life in 1974 as the Northwest Coast Institute of Arts founded by Bill Bartlett, an American artist who moved to Victoria in 1971. It was an artist-run school whose staff also included Jack Wise, Bill Porteous, Flemming Jorgensen, and James Gordaneer. Northwest Coast Institute of Arts shared the building on Lower Fort Street with Open Space, an exhibition gallery and performance centre founded in 1972 by Gene Miller, another American expatriate. In 1976 the art school was renamed Victoria College of Art with Joseph Kyle as its first director and moved to the former Bank Street Elementary School building where it has remained until the present day. Bill Bartlett took over running Open Space after Miller resigned.

Kyle would serve as VCA's director for the next 25 years and in 1981 led the whole school in a year-long experiment in geometric abstract painting. In the late 1970s, Joseph Kyle's son Paul, who had also been a student at the school opened Kyle's Gallery on Fort Street in Victoria which over the next 10 years showcased the work of the school's faculty. Joseph Kyle later opened the short-lived Victoria College of Art Gallery on Yates Street.

In 2006, the newly opened for-profit University Canada West (UCW) bought Victoria College of Art. The intention of the university's president David Strong was to expand UCW's program offerings and start a Bachelor of Fine Arts degree. The college was subsequently re-branded as "Victoria College of Art and Design" to reflect the proposed expansion of its curriculum. However, within two years of its acquisition, enrollment at the art college had dropped from 150 students to 12, and UCW abandoned its attempt to start the new degree. In November 2008, the Eminata Group bought the financially troubled university and with it, the art college. Eminata then opened a separate institution, Vancouver College of Art and Design, in April 2009. It shared the abbreviation VCAD with the fine arts college in Victoria, but not the curriculum. The Vancouver College of Art and Design was, and remains, a career college with courses in various aspects of fashion, graphic design, and interior design.

Five months after the Vancouver College of Art and Design opened, Peter Such and his brother Lionel bought the Victoria College of Art and Design from Eminata. Such, a professor emeritus of York University, had originally been hired by UCW to revive the art school's fortunes after the drastic drop in enrollment. He had been paying the art faculty's salaries himself since June 2009 and paid a further Can$20,000 in September for the school's assets and liabilities. At the time of the purchase, Such said that he planned to finance the school with his own funds until it was on a viable footing and then turn it over to a non-profit board and arts agency. Eminata retained ownership of the Vancouver College of Art and Design and rebranded it as the "Visual College of Art and Design".

Following its purchase by Such, the school returned to the "Victoria College of Art" name and started over again with approximately 100 students. The new start was celebrated with an exhibition of work by some of the school's past 2000 graduates. Peter Such remains the president of Victoria College of Art as of 2018 and has also served as the president of the Victoria Arts Council Board of Directors. Under his leadership, VAC added applied arts programs in digital animation and illustration.

The college holds a student art exhibition and sale each December at the college and a graduate exhibition each Spring at a local gallery as well as occasional faculty exhibitions. The Victoria Visual Arts Legacy Society was originally formed to provide bursaries and scholarships to students at Victoria College of Art. When the college was taken over by University Canada West, the society became an independent non-profit organization and expanded its mandate to include four other Greater Victoria post-secondary art institutions—Camosun College, the University of Victoria's Education and Fine Arts schools and the Vancouver Island School of Art. As of 2018, the society awards five bursaries annually to one student from VCA and to one student from each of the other four institutions.

== Academics ==
Victoria College of Art is accredited by the Private Training Institutions Branch (PTIB) of the British Columbia Ministry of Advanced Education, Skills & Training. It is also on the Ministry's registry of Education Quality Assurance (EQA) designated institutions. The college's animation program is recognized by Toon Boom Animation as a Centre of Excellence which is awarded to "exceptional academic programs for Animation and Storyboarding using Toon Boom software".

VCA offers three PTIB-approved Diploma programs: Fine Arts (three years full time), Applied Arts Illustration (two years full time), and Applied Arts Animation (two years full time). The college also offers Certificates in Fine Arts which can be studied full time or part time as well as shorter stand-alone courses and workshops.
