= London Business School (disambiguation) =

London Business School is a constituent college of the University of London.

London Business School may also refer to:

- City, University of London Business School
- London School of Business and Finance
