= Vancouver Career College =

Private college in British Columbia, Canada

Coordinates: 49.2842°N 123.1146°W

- Type: Private, for-profit career college
- Established: 1996
- Location: Vancouver (and 6 other cities), British Columbia, Canada
- Campus: Urban
- Owner: Eminata Group
- Website: career.college

Vancouver Career College is a private for-profit post-secondary career college with seven campuses in British Columbia, Canada. It specializes in training students for careers in health care, business, legal administration, education and various trades. Established in 1996, the college is owned by the Eminata Group via Vancouver Career College (Burnaby) Inc. which does business as three different career colleges: Vancouver Career College, CDI College, and Vancouver College of Art and Design.

== Campus locations ==
The college has seven locations in British Columbia:

- Abbotsford
- Burnaby
- Chilliwack
- Coquitlam
- Kelowna
- Surrey
- Vancouver

== Programs ==
Vancouver Career College is accredited by the Private Training Institutions Branch (PTIB) of the British Columbia Ministry of Advanced Education, Skills & Training. It offers over 50 PTIB-approved vocational courses, including:

- Practical Nursing
- Accounting and Payroll Administrator
- Construction Electrician Foundation
- Health Care Assistant
- International Trade
- Business Administration/E-Commerce Management
