= Eminata Group =

Education provider in Canada

- Industry: Education
- Headquarters: Vancouver, British Columbia, Canada
- Owner: Peter Chung (chairperson)

The Eminata Group is a for-profit provider of post-secondary education in Canada. The corporation, based in Vancouver, British Columbia, owns and manages a number of for-profit colleges in Canada, including Vancouver Career College, and CDI College and Campus Support parent company.

== History ==
Eminata is owned and chaired by the Korean-born businessman Peter Chung, whose family emigrated to the US when he was a boy. He built up an enterprise in California consisting of real estate ventures and for-profit schools but went bankrupt after the failure of his computer school, Wilshire Computer College, in 1993. Two years later, he founded Eminata in Vancouver. When Eminata purchased University Canada West in 2008, the Times Colonist reported that the corporation had annual revenues of approximately $50 million and owned 30 education centres across Canada. Eminata sold University Canada West, which had been dogged by student complaints and falling enrollment, to Global University Systems in 2015.

== Eminata career colleges ==
As of 2016, career colleges owned and run by Eminata Group include:

- CDI College is a for-profit career training college. According to the college, it is accredited and licensed by the Private Career Training Institutions Agency (PCTIA) in BC, Alberta Advanced Education, Manitoba Advanced Education and Literacy – Private Vocational Institutes and the Ministry of Education, Leisure and Sports in Quebec. In November 2020, it was named one of the ten private colleges under investigation for questionable recruitment practices.
- Reeves College, established in 1961 as Reeves Business College in Lloydminster, had specialized in training students for business and administrative careers. Since its acquisition by Eminata in 2003, its curriculum has expanded to include vocational training in the health care sector and the oil and gas industry. In November 2003, it opened campuses in Edmonton, Calgary, and Lethbridge.
- Vancouver College of Art and Design (VCAD) opened in 2009 in downtown Vancouver. It offers applied arts courses in Graphic Design, Fashion Design, Interior Design, 3D Modelling Animation Art & Design, Game Development and Design, Mobile Game Design and Development, and Marketing and Merchandising for Fashion.
- Vancouver Career College with six campuses in British Columbia—Vancouver, Burnaby, Surrey, Abbotsford, Coquitlam, and Kelowna—offers career training programs in business, education, health care, hospitality, trades, and art and design.
- PCU College of Holistic Medicine in the Greater Vancouver region of BC, teaches Traditional Chinese medicine and alternative health treatments. It originally offered courses in acupuncture and TCM in association with Vancouver Career College in Burnaby. In January 2004, it became a separate institution.
