= Trebas Institute =

Canadian private post-secondary college

Trebas Institute / Institut Trebas
- Type: Private, for-profit
- Established: 1979
- Parent institution: Global University Systems
- President: Mohamed Slimani
- Location: Canada
- Campus: Montreal
- Website: Official website

Trebas Institute is a for-profit private Canadian, bilingual, post-secondary college that offers music, film, business, technology and management programs, located in Montreal, Quebec.

== History ==
Trebas Institute, also known as Institut Trebas, was founded in 1979 by David P. Leonard.

In May 2020, Trebas was acquired by Netherlands-headquartered private education company Global University Systems.

Trebas was voted as one of the best institutions "where to train as an artist" at the Toronto Star 2020 Readers’ Choice Awards in October 2020.

As of January 2021, only international graduates from select programs offered at Trebas Institute’s Quebec campus in Montreal are eligible to receive a Canadian post-graduate work permit (PGWP). The institution’s programs at the Ontario campus in Toronto are not PGWP-eligible.

As of 2026, all programs offered at Trebas Institute leads to a Quebec Attestation of College Studies. Tuition ranges from $9,164 to $32,000 for both domestic and international students.

== Alumni ==
Notable Trebas alumni include Grammy Award-winning music producer, Mike Piersante; music producer, Jeremy Harding (from Sean Paul's 2009 album, Imperial Blaze); Megadeth singer and guitarist, Dave Mustaine; and singer, songwriter and producer from France, Dominique de Witte.
