= Reeves College =

Reeves College is a private for-profit post-secondary facility with five campuses in Alberta, Canada. The college specializes in training students for business, art and design, legal and health care related careers in under two years. Programs are developed in direct consultation with the business and health care communities to satisfy industry demands for certain skill sets. The college continuously accepts applications for enrolment in the next session of each certified career program.

== Campus locations ==
- Calgary City Centre
- Calgary North
- Edmonton
- Lethbridge
- Lloydminster

== History ==
Reeves College was founded in 1961 in Lloydminster, Alberta by C.J. Reeves. Reeves developed secretarial programs based on his experiences as a secretary and instructor. Programs were designed to train the whole individual. Therefore, key curriculum elements included practical skill development (typing, dictation, etc.) as well as professionalism and personal deportment. The college quickly gained a reputation for cultivating knowledgeable business office professionals as local businesses began hiring Reeves College graduates.

In 2003, the Eminata Group purchased Reeves College and introduced health care career programs. In 2004, Reeves College opened a campus in downtown Edmonton, Alberta. The Calgary campus opened in 2006. In 2008, the college opened a second campus in Calgary and a campus in Lethbridge

== Programs ==
Some of the more popular programs include:

- Legal Assistant (Paralegal)
- Graphic Design
- Addictions and Community Service Worker
- Business Administration Management
- Digital, Social Media & Web Marketing
- Health Care Administration
- Hospitality Management
- Accounting and Payroll Administrator
- Education assistant program

== Affiliations ==
Reeves College offers vocational training licensed under the Private Vocational Schools Act. Additionally, the college holds membership with the Alberta Association of Career Colleges (AACC) and the National Association of Career Colleges (NACC).
