= Pearl Academy =

Fashion school in India

- Former name: Pearl Academy of Fashion
- Type: Private
- Established: 1993
- Parent institution: Global University Systems
- President: Aditi Srivastava
- Location: India
- Campus: New Delhi, Mumbai, Jaipur, Bengaluru
- Website: Official website

Pearl Academy (formerly Pearl Academy of Fashion) is an India higher education institution. As of 2019 it has been owned by the for-profit education group Global University Systems.

== History ==
Pearl Academy of Fashion was set up in 1993 by the House of Pearl Fashion's education arm Little People Education Society. In 1995, Pearl started offering students degrees validated by the United Kingdom's Nottingham Trent University.

In July 2012, University Grants Commission (India) instructed Pearl Academy to stop awarding joint degrees with Nottingham Trent University, citing 'mounting complaints against private institutes'.

In 2015, concerns were raised about the validity of programmes delivered by the institution after an alumna reported that the Association of Indian Universities had 'refused to recognize her degree from Pearl Academy.

== Ownership ==
In 2011, Pearl became a part of the US-based education group Laureate International Universities network.

Laureate sold Pearl Academy to Netherlands-headquartered private education company Global University Systems in July 2019, as part of an INR 2,500 crore deal for Laureate's Indian business that also included the University of Petroleum and Energy Studies.

Since the acquisition, Global University Systems has partnered with Pearl Academy and UPES through a subsidiary company in India, GUS Global Services.

== Campuses ==
As of January 2021 the institution is present in four cities across India, with a campus each in Mumbai, Jaipur and Bangalore, and two in New Delhi (south and west).

== Notable alumni ==
- Alisshaa Ohri, Model
- Keerthy Suresh, Actress and Model
