= Compostela Group of Universities =

International non-profit association

- Abbreviation: CGU
- Formation: 3 September 1994; 32 years ago
- Type: Non-profit
- Purpose: Inter-university collaboration
- Headquarters: Santiago de Compostela, Spain
- President: Marek Kręglewski
- Main organ: General Assembly
- Website: web.gcompostela.org

The Compostela Group of Universities (CGU) is an international non-profit association that promotes and executes collaboration projects between institutions of higher education.

It currently has 67 full members, 2 associate members and 9 mutual membership agreements with institutions from 27 different countries.

== History ==
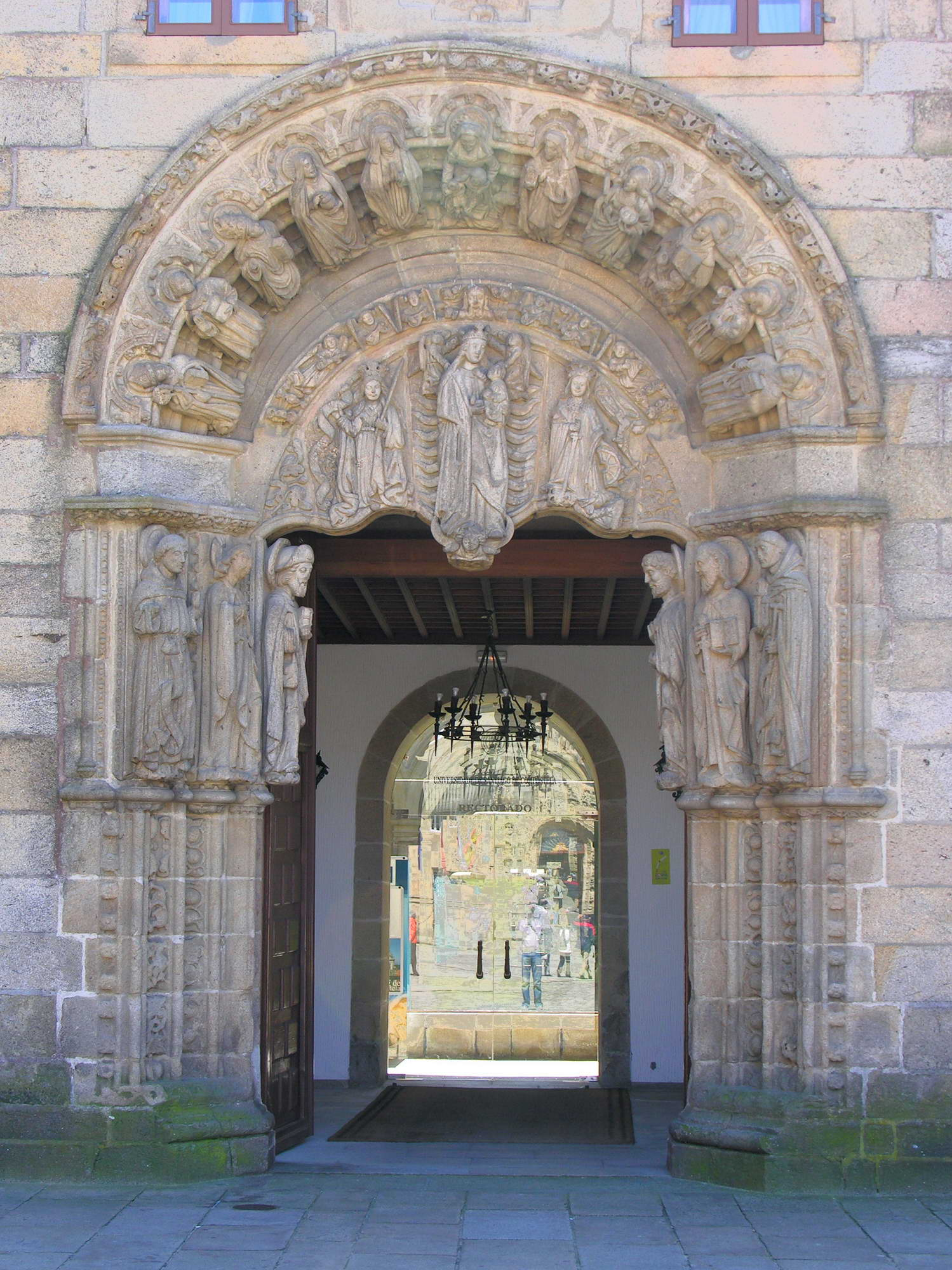
Pazo de Fonseca, part of the University of Santiago de Compostela, the founding institution of the CGU.

In 1993, the University of Santiago de Compostela began initiating contact with other institutions in higher education situated along the Way of St. James, to establish a university network for collaboration and to help helped to preserve the cultural and historical heritage that emerged along the ancient pilgrim route.

Following these initial developments, 57 European universities met in Santiago from 2–4 September 1993. They established the guidelines and objectives of the group. These included the following three, which are still the objectives of today's CGU:

- Strengthening the channels of communication between the member universities.
- Organizing events to study and discuss subjects related to Europe.
- Promoting mobility as the basis to increase the knowledge of European languages and cultures.

A commission consisting of representatives from the universities of Valladolid, Liège, Nantes, Göttingen, Minho, Jaume I and Santiago de Compostela drew up the Statutes of the Compostela Group of Universities. These were officially adopted at the first Constituent Assembly, held at the University of Santiago de Compostela from 2–3 September 1994.

== Organization ==
=== Structure ===
The Compostela Group of Universities is headquartered in Santiago de Compostela, Spain and has a regional office in Brussels, Belgium.

The organizations current president is Marek Kręglewski.

=== Activities ===
==== Compostela Prize ====
Symbol of the Way of St. James (represented on the gold medal, which is awarded to recipients of the International Prize Grupo Compostela-Xunta de Galicia)

In 1996, the CGU and the Regional Ministry of Culture, Social Communication and Tourism signed an agreement to establish the Compostela Prize (International Prize Grupo Compostela-Xunta de Galicia).

The prize is awarded annually and seeks to reward "[...] any individual or institution that have contributed to the promotion of the European dimension in education, either in teaching and research or in the cultural, social and political fields [...]." Nominations can be made by CGU member universities, members of the Xunta de Galicia and other official European institutions until the 1st of March each year.

The jury consists of the President of the Galician Government, who chairs the meetings, and the Regional Minister of Culture, the Regional Minister of Education and Universities and the Galician Director of Universities. The Compostela Group is represented by its president and three rectors of member universities, chosen annually by the General Council.

The prize is usually awarded at the end of the General Assembly of the Compostela Group of Universities, with the successful candidate receiving prize money and a commemorative gold medal in the shape of a shell (the centuries-old symbol of the pilgrimage to Santiago).

Recent recipients are:

- 2018: María Pilar Alonso Abad, Art history professor at the University of Burgos (UBU), for her academic work and unique research on the Jacobean cultural heritage.
- 2017: Marcelino Oreja Aguirre, Spanish Minister of Foreign Affairs, for his efforts in designating the Saint James Way as the Council of Europe's first cultural route.
- 2016: CIRCOM Regional, European Association of Regional Television, for the networks support in promoting European diversity and regional development.

== Members ==
The Compostela Group of Universities has the following members, as of 2021:

Belarus

- Yanka Kupala State University of Grodno

Brazil

- São Paulo State University

China

- Zhejiang Wanli University

Czech Republic

- Masaryk University

Dominican Republic

- Santo Domingo Institute of Technology

France

- University of Nantes

Georgia

- Grigol Robakidze University
- Ilia State University

Germany

- Philipps University of Marburg
- University of Regensburg

Hungary

- University of Pécs

Indonesia

- University of Surabaya

Italy

- Kore University of Enna
- Università telematica internazionale Uninettuno

Lithuania

- Kazimieras Simonavičius University

Malta

- University of Malta

Mexico

- Centro de Enseñanza Técnica y Superior
- Monterrey Institute of Technology and Higher Education
- Universidad Anáhuac Xalapa (Anahuac University Network)
- Universidad La Salle México
- University of Guadalajara
- University of Monterrey

Panama

- Columbus University

Peru

- ESAN University
- National University of San Marcos
- Federico Villarreal National University
- Peruvian University of Applied Sciences
- Pontifical Catholic University of Peru
- University of Lima
- University of Piura

Poland

- Adam Mickiewicz University in Poznań
- University of Łódź

Portugal

- University of Minho
- University of Trás-os-Montes and Alto Douro

Serbia

- University Business Academy in Novi Sad

Slovakia

- Pan-European University

Spain

- Jaume I University
- King Juan Carlos University
- Technical University of Madrid
- Universidad Politécnica de Cartagena
- University of A Coruña
- University of Almería
- University of Burgos
- University of Cádiz
- University of Extremadura
- University of La Laguna
- University of Las Palmas de Gran Canaria
- University of León
- University of Lleida
- University of Málaga
- University of Oviedo
- University of Salamanca
- University of Santiago de Compostela
- University of Seville
- University of the Basque Country
- University of Valencia
- University of Vigo
- University of Zaragoza

Sweden

- Karlstad University

Switzerland

- University of Fribourg

United Kingdom

- University of Worcester

=== Associate members ===
Greece

- Metropolitan College (AMC)

=== Collaborators ===
Brazil

- FAUBAI - Brazilian Association for International Education

Russia

- EEUA - Eastern European University Association

Slovenia

- Euro-Mediterranean University of Slovenia

Spain

- Erasmus Compostela

United Kingdom

- Quacquarelli Symonds

United States

- Consortium for North American Higher Education Collaboration
- HACU - Hispanic Association of Colleges and Universities
- Scholars at Risk

== See also ==
- National Institutes of Technology, 31 leading public engineering universities in India
