= Visual College of Art and Design =

For-profit career college in Vancouver, Canada

Coordinates: 49.2842°N 123.1146°W

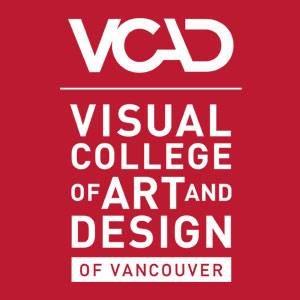
- Other names: Visual College of Art and Design; VCAD
- Type: for-profit career college
- Established: 2009
- Address: 626 Pender Street, Vancouver, British Columbia, Canada
- Owner: Eminata Group
- Website: vcad.ca

Visual College of Art and Design, or simply VCAD, is a for-profit career college in Vancouver, Canada owned by the Eminata Group. The college offers diploma programs in various aspects of fashion, graphic design, architecture design and technology, interior design, game design, and animation. It has no relation to the fine arts college Victoria College of Art, although the latter was also owned for 10 months by Eminata between November 2008 and September 2009 during which time it was branded as "Victoria College of Art and Design".

== History ==
VCAD is owned by the Eminata Group via Vancouver Career College (Burnaby) Inc. which does business as three different career colleges: Vancouver Career College, CDI College, and Visual College of Art and Design. Eminata established VCAD and began recruiting students in February 2009. It officially opened in April of that year in an office building on 1111 Melville Street in Vancouver. The college shared the building with University Canada West which at the time was also owned by Eminata. In September 2010 the VCAD campus relocated to its present site, the London Building on 626 Pender Street where it occupies several floors.

== Programs ==
VCAD is certified by the Private Training Institutions Branch (PTIB) of the British Columbia Ministry of Advanced Education, Skills & Training. It is also on the Ministry's registry of Education Quality Assurance (EQA) designated institutions. As of 2018, it offers 13 full-time PTIB-approved diploma programs in various aspects of fashion, graphic design, architecture design and technology, interior design, game design, web and app design, and animation. Three of the programs also offer work experience as part of the course: Architecture Design and Technology, Interior Design with Co-op, and Marketing and Merchandising for Fashion.
