= Berlin School of Business and Innovation =

Private business school in Berlin, Germany

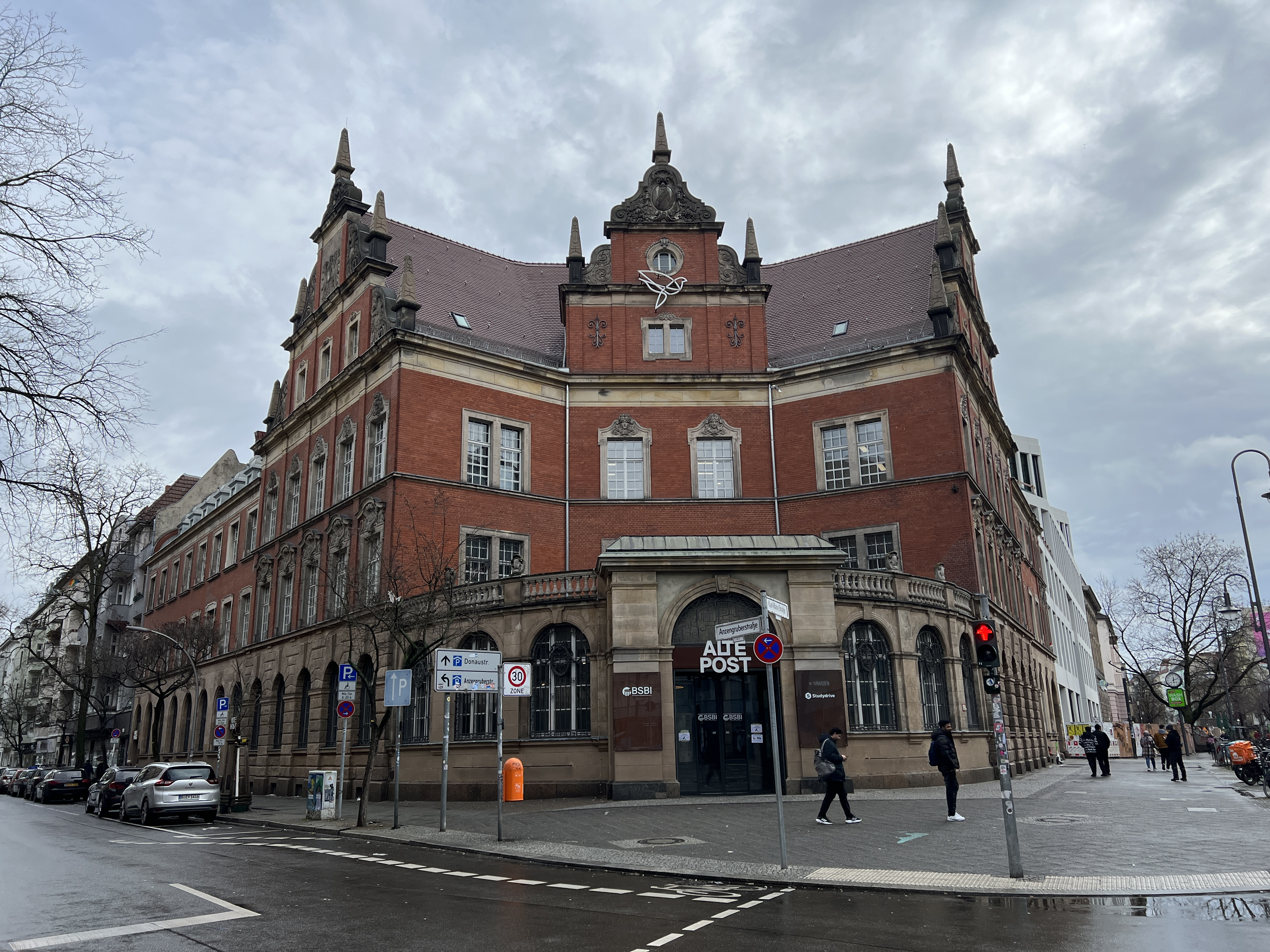
- Alte Post in Berlin-Neukölln, one of BSBI's locations
- Type: Private, for-profit
- Established: 2017; 9 years ago
- Parent institution: Global University Systems
- Key People: Sagi Hartov (Executive Chairman)
- Location: Berlin, Germany
- Website: Official website

BSBI School of Business and Innovation is a European business school run by private, for-profit education company Global University Systems in Berlin. The franchise launched in 2017 and began instructing students in 2018.

== History ==
BSBI School of Business and Innovation was founded in 2017 by Global University Systems (GUS), a for-profit education company. According to the Berlin Senate, "The Berlin School of Business and Innovation (BSBI) is a franchise institution operated by Global University Systems (GUS), which was reported in 2017 in accordance with §124a BerlHG in the state of Berlin."

In November 2019, BSBI announced that it had partnered with Concordia University Chicago to deliver programmes at its Berlin campus.

In June 2020, BSBI became an official signatory of the United Nations Principles for Responsible Management Education (UN-PRME) initiative.

In October 2022, BSBI relocated its Berlin campus to the historic Alte Post building in Neukölln. The move was covered by Der Tagesspiegel, which noted the building's heritage status as a former early 20th-century post office that had been converted into a modern educational facility.

In 2023, BSBI expanded to Barcelona, establishing a teaching campus at CETT Barcelona School of Tourism, Hospitality and Gastronomy. The expansion was reported by QS GEN as part of the institution's international growth strategy. In October 2023, BSBI organized a TEDx event named TEDxBerlinSBI at its Berlin campus.

In December 2023, BSBI partnered with the University of Roehampton London to expand its programme offerings. In July 2025, the institution announced a strategic academic partnership with the University of Chichester.

In April 2025, BSBI opened a second campus in Berlin on Donaustrasse. In May 2026, BSBI opened its first independent campus outside of Germany, located on the Paseo de la Castellana in Madrid, Spain.

== Academics ==
BSBI offers undergraduate and postgraduate business programmes, including a Global MBA, as well as creative industries programmes through its Hamburg campus.

The institution does not hold degree-awarding powers in Germany and its programmes are validated by several international partner universities, including International Telematic University UniNettuno (Italy), University for the Creative Arts (UK), Concordia University Chicago (US), University of Roehampton (UK), and University of Chichester (UK). As of 2025, BSBI operates campuses in Berlin (two locations), Hamburg, Paris, and Barcelona, with a planned campus in Madrid. The Berlin main campus is located in the historic Alte Post building at Karl-Marx-Strasse 97-99 in the Neukölln district. A second Berlin campus opened in April 2025 on Donaustrasse.

The Hamburg campus, which houses the Faculty of Creative Industries, is located at Gasstrasse 6B in the Otto von Bahrenpark area. The Paris campus operates at 5-7 Rue Dareau in partnership with PPA Business School and ESGI. The Barcelona campus is located at CETT Barcelona School of Tourism, Hospitality and Gastronomy.

In Spain, BSBI's Professional Master's programmes have been certified by CUALIFICAM, the Madrid Knowledge Foundation's quality procedure for professional masters programmes. Under this framework, BSBI awards its own CUALIFICAM-certified Professional Master's Diploma in Spain, alongside degrees from partner universities. As of 2024-2025, BSBI enrolls over 7,000 students from more than 100 nationalities across its campuses.

== Associations ==
BSBI is a member of the Business Graduates Association, the Association to Advance Collegiate Schools of Business (AACSB) Business Education Alliance, UN PRME, Asociación Española de Escuelas de Negocios (AEEN), and the European Union of Private Higher Education (EUPHE).
