= IBAT College Dublin =

Private third-level college in Dublin, Ireland

IBAT Dublin
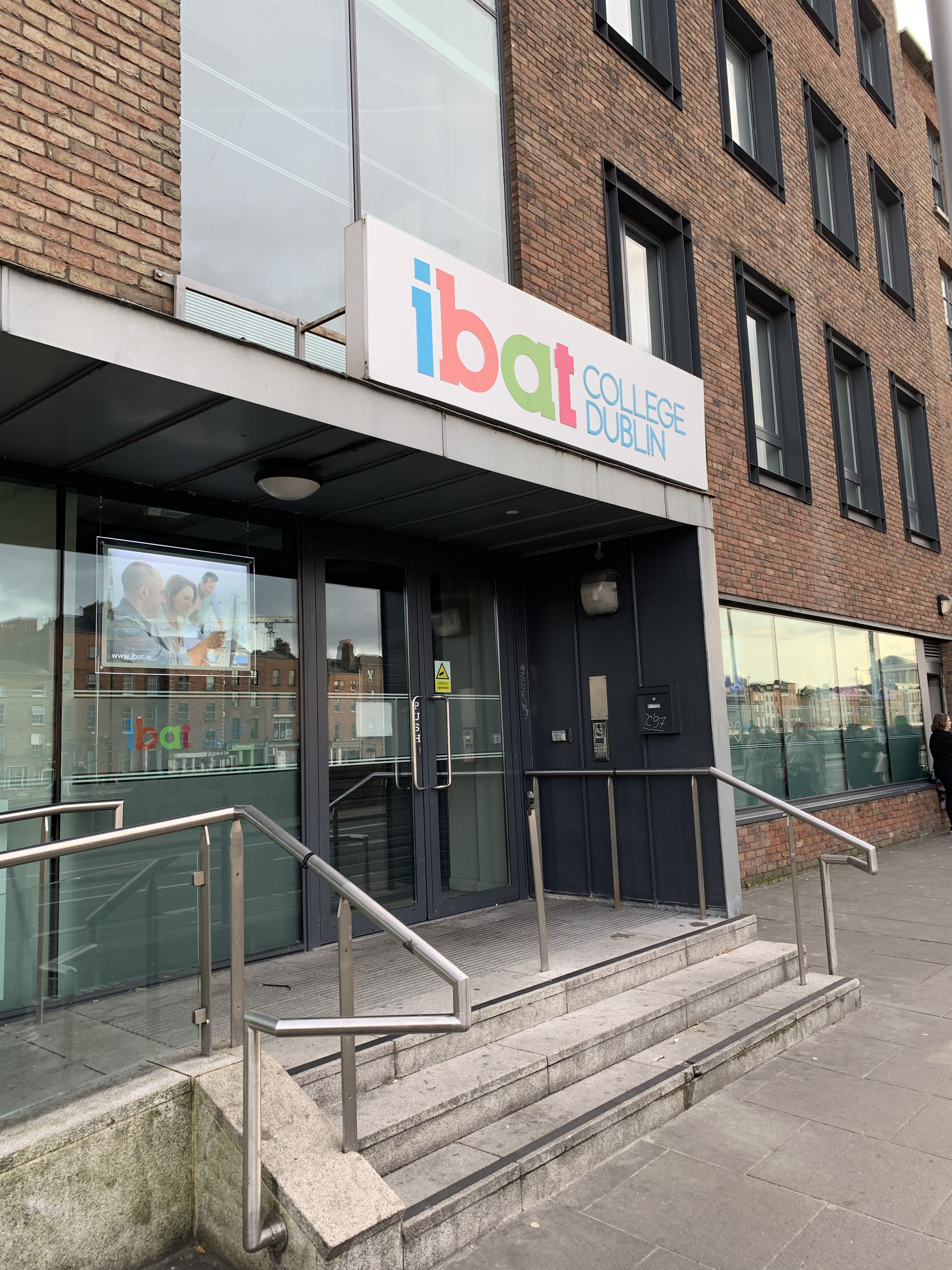
- Former names: Institute of Business and Technology; IBAT College Swords
- Type: Private for-profit higher education institution
- Established: 2004
- Founder: Shane Ormsby
- Principal: Joe Gorey
- Students: c.1500 (as of 2021)
- Location: 16–19 Wellington Quay, Dublin, Ireland; 53.345661°N 6.265461°W
- Owner: Global University Systems
- Website: ibat.ie

IBAT Dublin is a private for-profit higher education institution located in Dublin, Ireland. It was founded in 2004 as the Institute of Business and Technology. From 2009 to 2011 it was known as IBAT College Swords. As of 2019, the college offers a Bachelor of Arts (Honours) degree in business and an MBA validated by the University of Wales Trinity Saint David. It also offers English-language courses and its own short courses in various subjects related to business and technology.

== History ==
The college was founded in 2004 by Shane Ormsby who was principal shareholder and served as director. Originally called the Institute of Business and Technology, its first campus was on Forster Way in the Swords area of north Dublin. In 2006, it received programme validation from the Higher Education and Training Awards Council (HETAC). By 2011, it was offering the Certificate in Business, Higher Certificate in Business, Bachelor of Business, and Bachelor of Business (Honours). In addition to those HETAC-validated programmes, it also offered an MBA validated by the University of Wales Trinity Saint David and various accountancy, business, and technology training programmes which at the time were approved by ATI, ACCA, ICS and ICM.

The college changed its name to IBAT College Swords in July 2009. It was changed again in July 2011 to its present name, IBAT Dublin, to reflect its move to a new purpose-built main campus in the centre of Dublin at Temple Bar. In 2016 the college was acquired by the Global University Systems group, one of Europe's largest private third-level education groups, with presences across more than 60 countries. A QQI review was taking place at the time of the acquisition and following re-engagement with QQI in 2018, the college received approval to run a Bachelor of Arts (Honours) in Business in 2019.

== Academic programmes ==
As of 2019, IBAT Dublin offers a full- or part-time Bachelor of Arts (Honours) degree in business (validated by Quality and Qualifications Ireland) and a part-time MBA (validated by the University of Wales Trinity Saint David). In addition to the degree programmes, IBAT offers English-language courses and its own short courses in various subjects related to business and technology.
