= Sagi, Pakistan =

Sagi
- Country: Pakistan
- Region: Federally Administered Tribal Areas
- District: Mohmand Agency
- Tehsil: Safi

Population (2017)
  - Total: 41,384
- Time zone: UTC+5 (PST)
  - Summer (DST): UTC+6 (PDT)

Sagi is an area of Safi Tehsil, Mohmand Agency, Federally Administered Tribal Areas, Pakistan. The population is 41,384 according to the 2017 census.
