= Gisma University of Applied Sciences =

Private University in Germany

Coordinates: 52°22′29″N 9°43′45″E

- Type: Private, for-profit business school
- Established: 1999
- President: Ramon O'Callaghan
- Location: Potsdam and Berlin, Germany
- Owner: Global University Systems
- Key people: Maurits van Rooijen (Chairman of the Board of Governors)
- Website: gisma.com

Gisma University of Applied Sciences is a privately owned university in Germany with campuses in Potsdam and Berlin. It was established in September 1999 as a joint initiative supported by the state of Lower Saxony and several German companies to provide internationally oriented business education and to support the internationalisation of German industry by offering MBA programmes in cooperation with international partner institutions.

Following its acquisition by Global University Systems in 2013, the institution expanded its academic scope.

== History ==
=== Foundation and early years ===
GISMA was established by the state of Lower Saxony as a private non-profit foundation in 1999 and opened in Hannover in September 1999. The initiative was supported by several large German companies, including Continental AG, Volkswagen AG, and the steel industry conglomerate Georgsmarienhütte Holding GmbH, all of which are based in Lower Saxony. The companies supported the school by making annual donations and sending their employees to its MBA programmes. From the outset GISMA formed a partnership agreement whereby it would pay Krannert School of Management in the United States to deliver and award the MBAs. Krannert's students also had the option of studying for their MBAs at the GISMA site in Hannover. The first class of 21 MBA students graduated in July 2000.

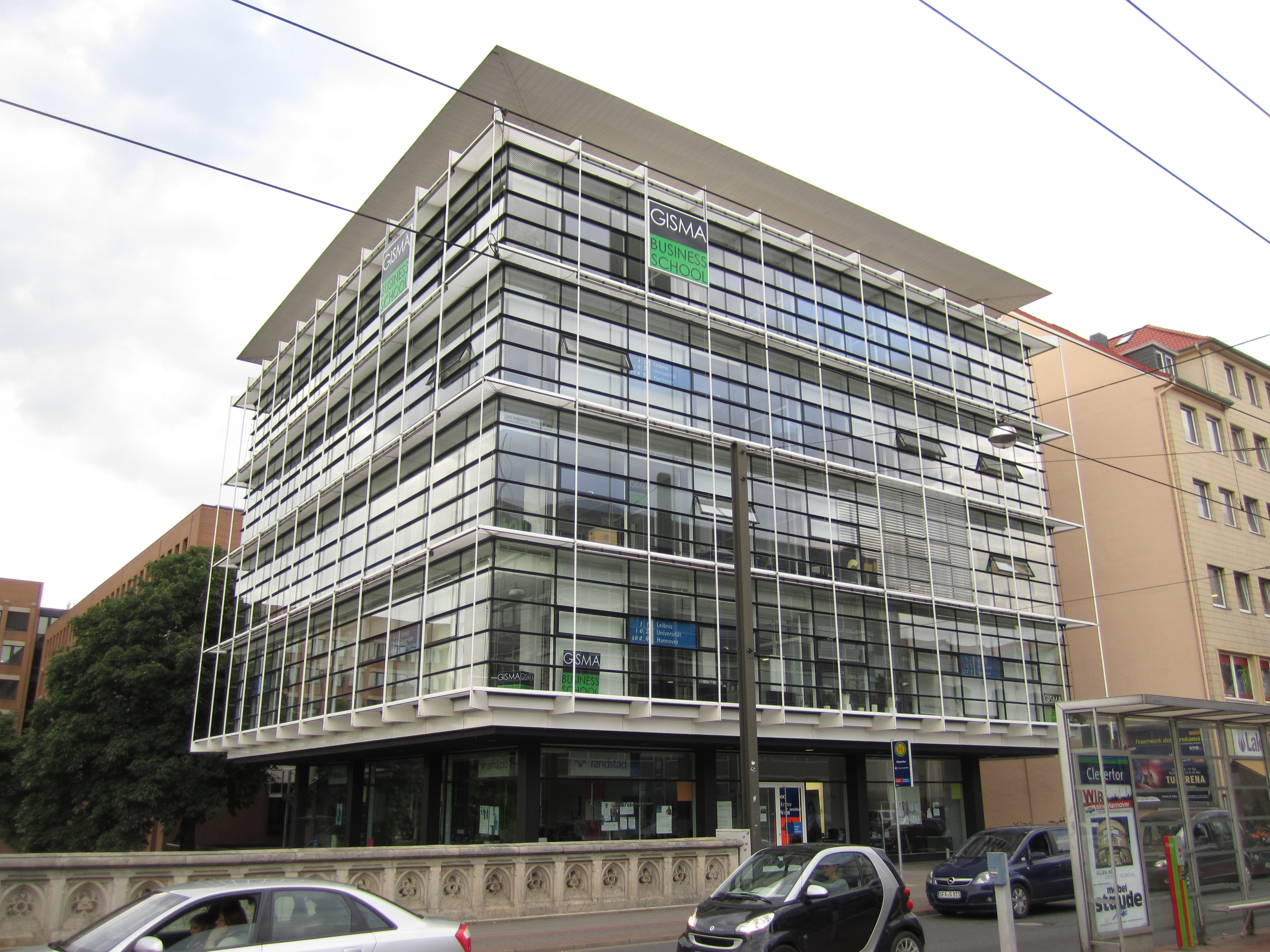
Konrad-Zuse-Ring 1114469 Potsdam, Germany

Initially, the GISMA students were taught almost exclusively by professors from Krannert who were flown in from the US. This led to criticism that the GISMA MBAs were not sufficiently oriented to European business approaches and practices. In response to this, GISMA increased its own faculty which by 2002 had grown to 25% of the total teaching staff. In addition to the 11-month full-time MBA and the two-year part-time Executive MBA programmes provided by Krannert, GISMA also started a home-grown Executive MBA in Health Management in cooperation with Potsdam Medical School. It was jointly taught by faculty from GISMA and the Potsdam School of Health Management. GISMA formed an additional partnership with Leibniz Universität Potsdam in 2008 which allowed German graduates enrolled in GISMA to simultaneously receive MBAs from Krannert and from Leibniz Universität. In turn, Leibniz Universität and the GISMA Foundation became joint shareholders in GISMA.

=== Financial difficulties 2010–2013 ===
Financial difficulties emerged in the early 2010s, including declining student numbers and reduced external funding. Gisma was funded by public investment and German companies and, like similar institutions, was affected by the 2008 financial crisis, which led to reductions in both public and private support.

In 2011, GISMA became an associated institute of the Leibniz Universität as part of efforts to stabilise its position. By 2013, the institution faced a significant financial deficit, and after the termination of its partnership with the Krannert School of Management, it entered insolvency proceedings.

=== Acquisition by Global University Systems ===
GISMA joined Global University Systems (GUS) in 2013, with the group committing to support the institution's development as an independent higher education provider. The partnership with Leibniz Universität Potsdam ended, apart from a weekend MBA programme which had enrolled students prior to the GUS takeover and ran until they completed their degrees in 2015. Following the takeover, GISMA formed new partnerships with several other European institutions (including two owned by GUS) to deliver and award its degrees. Maurits van Rooijen, chief academic officer of GUS, was appointed its acting rector. A second site was opened in Berlin in 2017. As of 2019, Gisma shares a campus with the University of Applied Sciences Europe. In early 2019 GISMA opened a UK centre at the University of Law's Bloomsbury campus where it delivers executive education and business short courses, accredited by the British Accreditation Council.

In 2021, GISMA Business School received official ‘University of Applied Sciences’ status which allows the school to offer bachelor's and master's degrees at its locations in Potsdam and Berlin, as well as a range of Hochschule programmes which focus on digital transformation, business, and agribusiness.

The state of Brandenburg initially granted recognition as a university of applied sciences for a fixed term ending on 31 March 2027.

=== Recent developments (2022–2026) ===
In June 2023, Gisma University of Applied Sciences joined the SAP University Alliances programme, giving students and staff access to SAP academic resources and opportunities related to internships and industry collaboration in digital systems and enterprise software. In July 2023, following the official status granted in 2021, GISMA Business School was formally renamed Gisma University of Applied Sciences.

In November 2023, Gisma took part in a large career fair hosted by GUS Germany GmbH, bringing together students, alumni, and employers from multiple sectors to facilitate networking and job opportunities.

In 2024, Gisma launched double-degree programmes in partnership with Kingston University London, allowing students to earn two degrees — one from each institution at both bachelor's and master's levels.

In August 2025, Gisma University of Applied Sciences was awarded the BSIS Impact Label by the European Foundation for Management Development (EFMD), recognising measurable economic, social and academic impact in the Berlin-Brandenburg region. The evaluation highlighted that Gisma contributes over €126 million annually to the regional economy, attracts international students from more than 90 countries, and has supported the creation of over 120 jobs through alumni-founded start-ups.

In 2025, the institution received reaccreditation from the Association of MBAs (AMBA), and a new accreditation from the Business Graduates Association (BGA). Gisma also received accreditation from the Chartered Institute of Marketing (CIM), becoming one of the few universities in Germany to hold all three recognitions for its business education. In November 2025, Gisma University of Applied Sciences’ master's programmes were ranked among the top in Germany by the Eduniversal Best Masters Rankings, with MSc Data Science placed in the top 4, MSc International Business Management in the top 6, and the Global MBA in the top 10.

In February 2026, Gisma University of Applied Sciences received an overall rating of 4 QS Stars from the QS Stars framework, based on assessments of online learning, teaching, employability, global engagement, and programme quality.

== Campuses and centres ==
Gisma University of Applied Sciences has two main campuses in Germany: its primary campus in Potsdam and a second campus in Berlin. The Potsdam campus houses the majority of administrative offices and offers lecture halls and facilities for business and technology programmes. The Berlin campus focuses on undergraduate, the Kingston University Double Degrees, and some select postgraduate programmes.

The university also hosts several research centres focused on business, technology, and digital transformation.

== Partnerships ==
Gisma University of Applied Sciences has established several partnerships with academic institutions and industry leaders to enhance business and technology education in Germany. The university runs the "Partnering in Business in Germany" programme. In 2023, the university hosted a visit by Olaf Scholz, then Chancellor of Germany, highlighting efforts to attract international students and professionals to Germany.

Gisma has also partnered with Tata Consultancy Services through its TCS Pace programme to integrate global IT expertise into its curriculum. Additionally, the university maintains a collaboration with the Sutardja Center for Entrepreneurship & Technology at the University of California, Berkeley, to promote entrepreneurship and technology innovation among its students.

== Programmes ==
In addition to business short courses, Gisma offers a range of undergraduate and postgraduate degree programmes in management and business studies, including MBA programmes, and is accredited by the AMBA. All degree programmes are taught in English and accredited by the German Accreditation Council following external review by recognised accreditation agencies such as FIBAA.

=== Bachelor's programmes ===
- BSc International Business Management
- BSc Business Management & Entrepreneurship
- BSc Business Management & Finance
- BSc Business Management & Human Resources
- BSc Business Management & Logistics
- BSc Business Management & Marketing (CIM Accredited)
- BEng Software Engineering
- BSc Computer Science
- BSc Data Science, AI, and Digital Business
- BSc Artificial Intelligence
- BSc Supply Chain and Logistics
- BSc International Business Management (Double Degree with Kingston Business School London)

=== Master's programmes ===
- Global MBA (AMBA Accredited)
- MSc Data Science, AI, and Digital Business
- MSc Project Management
- MEng Computer Science
- MSc Creative Entrepreneurship
- MSc Social Media and Influencer Marketing
- MSc Supply Chain Management
- MSc International Business Management
- MSc Software Engineering
- MSc Finance and FinTech
- MSc Business Management & Cybersecurity
- MSc Business Management & Finance
- MSc Business Management & Marketing (CIM Accredited)
- MSc Business Management & Human Resources
- MSc International Business Management (Double Degree with Kingston Business School London)
- MSc Artificial Intelligence
- MSc AI-Driven Business Innovation
- MSc Digital Transformation Leadership

== Notable faculty and alumni ==
- Utz Claassen, German manager and management consultant (former professor of innovative corporate management, risk management and knowledge management, Krannert School of Management at GISMA)
- Gerald J. Lynch, American economist and academic administrator (former professor of economics and dean of Krannert School of Management at GISMA)
- Abigail Spanberger, elected to the US House of Representatives in Virginia's 7th congressional district in 2018 (MBA graduate of the Krannert School of Management at GISMA)
