= Gerald J. Lynch =

Dean of the Krannert School of Management at Purdue University
- Incumbent
- Assumed office July 1, 2010
- Preceded by: Richard A. Cosier

Personal details
- Education: University of Kentucky; Bellarmine College
- Website: www.krannert.purdue.edu

Jerry Lynch is a Professor of Economics at Purdue University. Lynch earned his Bachelor of Arts degree in business administration from Bellarmine College and his Master's and Ph.D. in economics from the University of Kentucky in 1971 and 1975 respectively.

Lynch joined the Krannert faculty as a visitor in 1982 and became a member of the full-time faculty in 1984. He served as associate dean of the German International Graduate School of Management and Administration (GISMA), Krannert's international outreach MBA program in Hannover, Germany, from 1999 to 2001. He was associate dean for programs and student services from 2001 to 2006 before becoming academic director of master's and executive education programs in 2006. In the spring of 2006, he was a visiting researcher at the World Bank in Washington, D.C.

Lynch was voted by master's students as the recipient of the Salgo-Noren Award as outstanding instructor five times. He is a Fellow of the Teaching Academy at Purdue, and was listed in 1994 by BusinessWeek as one of the 12 best teachers nationally in schools of business.

Lynch specializes in monetary theory and policy, macroeconomics, and international trade and finance. He has been published in numerous journals, including the American Economic Review, Journal of Regional Science, Journal of Economics and Business, Review of Financial Economics, and Journal of Economic Education. He co-authored three economics textbooks and another book geared toward high school economics teachers. Lynch has also worked as an economic consultant for companies including Sears, Caterpillar, B.F. Goodrich, TRW, Wabash National, and BankOne.
