= Alisshaa Ohri =

Indian model and Artist

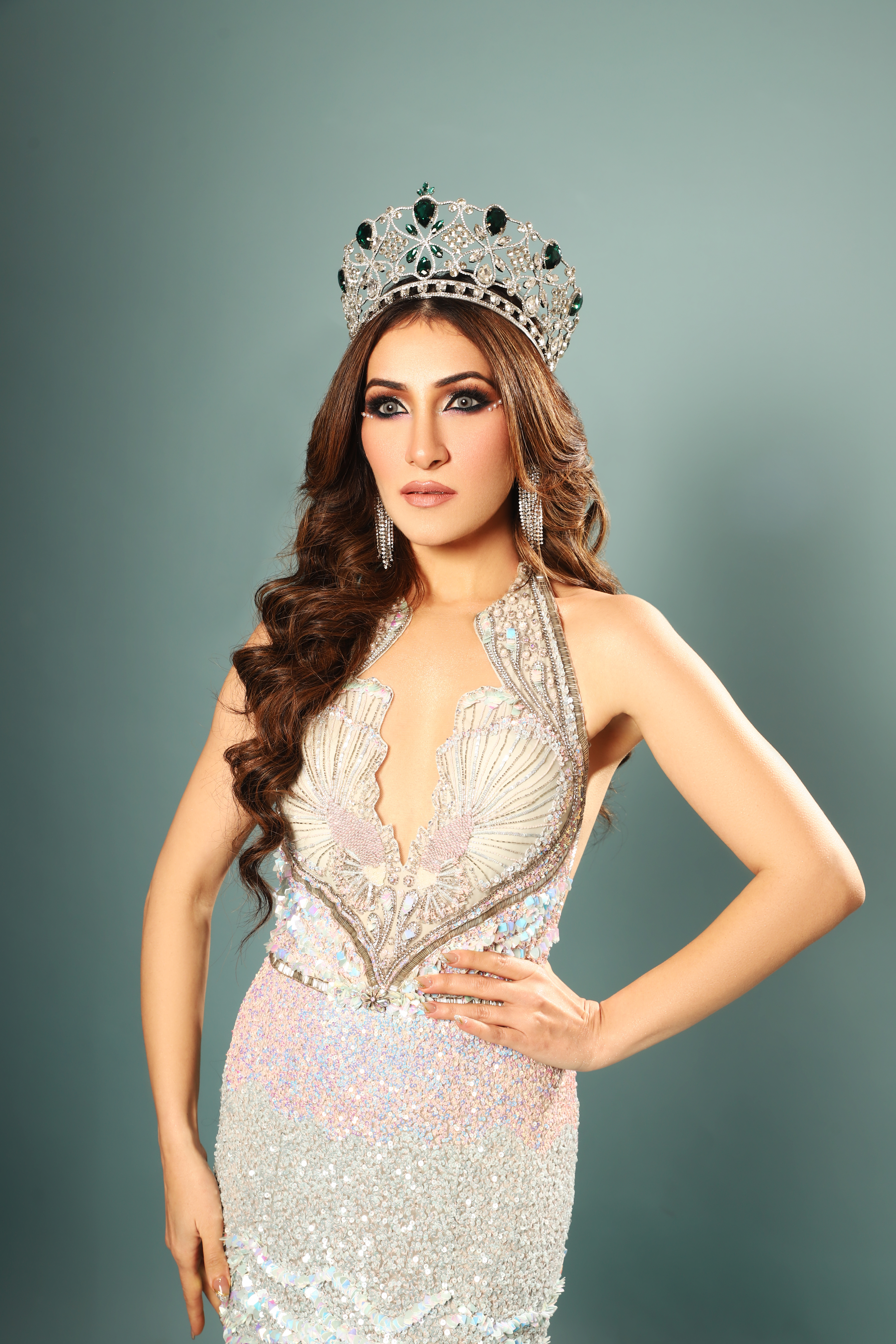
- Alissha in 2022
- Born: 11 June 1986 (age 40)
- Other name: Alisha Ohri
- Education: Pearl Academy
- Occupations: Model; Artist
- Years active: 2021–present
- Title: Mrs. Universe Popularity 2022; Mrs. India Legacy 2021
- Spouse: Dhruvv Ohri
- Children: Ammira Ohri, Hrehaan Ohri
- Parent(s): Madan Gopal Bathla and Late Mrs Jyoti Bathla

Alisshaa Ohri (born June 11, 1986) is an Indian model working as an entrepreneur and makeup artist by profession, who won the title of Mrs. India Legacy at the Diadem Mrs. India Legacy pageant in 2021. Alisshaa also represented India at Mrs. Universe 2022 pageant in Bulgaria, where she won the title of Mrs. Popular 2022.

== Early life and education ==
Alisshaa Ohri was born on 11 June 1986 to Madan Gopal Bathla and Mrs Jyoti Bathla. She completed her graduation in Philosophy Honors from Miranda House Delhi, and a Diploma in Fashion and Media Makeup from Pearl Academy of Fashion, Delhi. She married businessman Dhruvv Ohri. After her marriage, she chose and found her passion to compete in a beauty pageant.

== Pageantry ==
=== Mrs. India Legacy 2021 ===
Mrs. India Legacy is a beauty pageant in India exclusively for married women over 30. Alisshaa Ohri began her pageantry career in 2021 and bagged the title of Diadem Mrs. India Legacy 2021-22.

=== Mrs Universe 2022 ===
Alisshaa Ohri represented India in 45th Mrs. Universe 2022 in the year 2023 held in Sofia, Bulgaria. Alissha won the title of Mrs. Popular 2022 at the 45th Mrs. Universe 2022.
