= St Patrick's College, London =

Educational institution in England

Coordinates: 51.5423°N 0.00256°W

St Patrick's College
- Other name: St Patrick's International College
- Type: For-profit private higher education college
- Established: 1999
- Principal: Deborah Hayes
- Location: Tower Hill, London, UK
- Campus: Urban
- Owner: Global University Systems
- Website: st-patricks.ac.uk

St Patrick's College (also known as St Patrick's International College) is a for-profit private higher education college based in the United Kingdom with its main campus located at Tower Hill in London. The college offers Higher National Diploma programmes in business and health care. Although its roots trace back to a Catholic primary school founded in Soho in 1803, the college was established in its present form in 1999. Since 2013 it has been a wholly owned subsidiary of the corporate group Global University Systems.

== History ==
=== Establishment ===
St Patrick's College traces its roots to St. Patrick's School, part of a group of schools established in 1803 by St Patrick's Church for the education of poor children in the Soho area of London. The school operated at 24 Great Chapel St until 1967. After its closure, the Catholic Church ran St Patrick's as a language school teaching English. In 1998, the language school was bought by Girish Chandra and incorporated as St. Patrick's International College Limited in 1999. Under Chandra's ownership, the college began adding externally awarded diplomas at both undergraduate and postgraduate level in law, business, tourism and hospitality, computing and health and social care. In 2012 Chandra sold the college to the entrepreneur Aaron Etingen (also known as Arkady Etingen) through Etingen's company Interactive World Wide Limited. Etingen is the founder of the London School of Business and Finance and several associated for-profit colleges known collectively as the LSBF Group. After the purchase, St Patrick's College was describing itself as "a member of the LSBF Group". In a subsequent reorganisation of his companies begun in late 2012, Etingen established Global University Systems which is registered in The Netherlands as a besloten vennootschap (BV), a type of private limited liability company. Global University Systems BV then became the owner of St Patrick's College and the institutions of the LSBF Group through Dutch BV holding companies.

=== Expansion ===
St Patrick's College and the LSBF Group expanded rapidly after the 2011 market reforms of post-secondary education introduced by UK higher education minister David Willetts. The reforms opened up access to government-funded maintenance grants and loans for students in private colleges. Together, the London School of Business and Finance and St Patrick's grew from 50 government-funded students in 2011 to approximately 6,000 over the next two years. LSBF and St Patrick's collectively netted £13.5m in tuition fee payments, with their students receiving a total of £49m in government grants and loans. An £80 million overspend on student loans at private providers led the government temporarily to suspend St Patrick's designation for receiving student loan funding, along with that of LSBF and 21 other private colleges. The designation was restored for the 2014–2015-year, and by the end of that year, St Patrick's had 6,668 students claiming £25.3 million in tuition loans from the Student Loans Company. It had become the biggest private higher education provider in England in terms of the number of students claiming SLC loans. To accommodate the increased student numbers, the college moved its main teaching site from Soho, first to Carey Street near Covent Garden and then to Billiter Street in the City of London which it shared with other colleges in the LSBF Group, and finally to High Street in the Stratford area in 2015.

The college's rapid expansion also generated a number of student and staff complaints, described in The Guardian in 2014 and in the BBC Radio programme Face the Facts broadcast on 26 February 2015. The BBC programme aired allegations that between 2012 and 2014 the college offered a poor learning environment with large classes and over-crowding and some student work rejected as sub-standard by its external examining body after having been initially passed with high marks by the college. The students' complaints also led to an investigation by the UK's Quality Assurance Agency for Higher Education (QAA) in March 2015. According to the QAA, the concerns related primarily to admissions procedures, programme approval, the learning environment, student retention and attendance, teaching quality, and record keeping. The QAA report found that practice was "broadly acceptable in four out of six areas examined. The "significant exceptions" were admissions procedures and student retention and attendance, where the QAA said the "concerns raised are justified." The QAA found dropout rates of more than 30 per cent and evidence "indicative of recruitment errors and a failure to ensure that academic staff are equipped to cope with periodic disciplinary problems". According to an article in Times Higher Education published on 7 May 2015, the UK government nevertheless allowed the college to resume access to public money after it had been suspended earlier in the year. Daniel Khan, the college's principal at the time, was quoted in the article as saying that the college "takes particular satisfaction from QAA's finding that the majority of the concerns raised cannot be upheld and its recognition that students speak positively about the helpfulness of teaching staff, person[al] tutors, and unit leaders".

=== Post-2015 ===
According to a UK Home Office spokesman quoted in Times Higher Education, St Patrick's College had its Tier 2 and Tier 4 visa sponsor licenses suspended on 19 February 2015 "due to concerns about a number of compliance issues." The college was given 20 working days to submit representations to a review. As of January 2019 the college is not on the Home Office registers of Tier 2 and Tier 4 sponsors and thus cannot recruit non-European Union students or offer them work placements.

In September 2015 St Patrick's parent company Global University Systems (GUS) announced plans for a two-year restructuring process of the corporation's UK holdings set to begin in mid-2016. According to John Cox, at the time director of organisational development at GUS, the plan would involve the London School of Business and Finance coming under a new vocational entity offering only diploma courses, short courses and corporate training products. The vocational courses delivered by St Patrick's College would also come under this division.

By the April 2016 Academic Management Review by Pearson Education (who validate the college's Higher National Diploma and other professional and postgraduate diplomas), the student enrollment on the HND courses was down to about 2000 from a previous high of 4000. The HND recruitment was predominantly domestic. The review singled out two areas of "exemplary practice":

1. "A robust system for obtaining student feedback on teaching and learning" was in place.
2. "Plagiarism panels which highlight the importance of proper referencing by students" were "utilised to maximum effect."

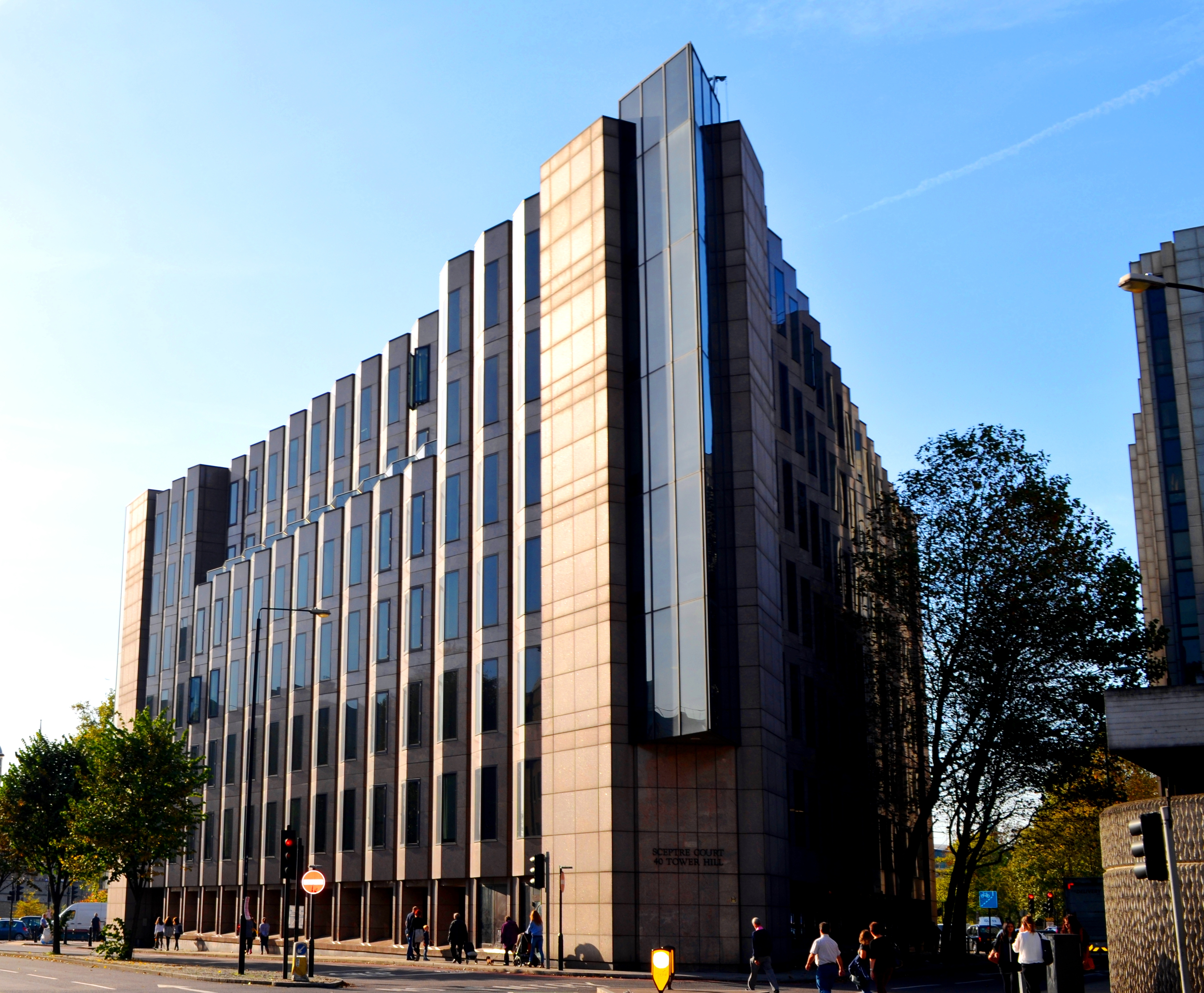
St Patrick's College Tower Hill campus

== Courses ==
As of 2019, the college has two schools: Business Plus and Health Plus. Within these schools, various programmes are offered for Higher National Diplomas accredited by Pearson Edexcel. In the past, the college also had schools of Technology, Tourism and Hospitality, Art and Design, and Law and offered several post-graduate diplomas and degrees awarded by a variety of external providers.

== Campus ==
The campus of St Patrick's is located at Sceptre Court in London's Tower Hill which it shares with the London School of Business and Finance. Previous campuses were at Duncan House in the Stratford area of London with a further site in the Holborn area.
