= Global University Systems =

Private education company based in the Netherlands

Global University Systems B.V.
- Type: Private (B.V.)
- Industry: Higher education
- Founded: 2013
- Founder: Aaron Etingen
- Headquarters: Tower H 5th Floor WTC Amsterdam; Zuidplein 36; 1077 XV, Amsterdam, The Netherlands
- Area served: Worldwide
- Key people: Aaron Etingen (CEO); Maurits van Rooijen (Chief Academic Officer)
- Website: globaluniversitysystems.com

Global University Systems B.V. (GUS) is a Netherlands-based corporate group that owns and operates private not-for-profit and for-profit colleges and universities in Europe, North America, Asia, and the Middle East. The company also owns and operates other brands and companies in the education sector.

== History ==
The London School of Business and Finance (LSBF), the forerunner of GUS, was founded in 2003 by British entrepreneur Aaron "Arkady" Etingen. This was expanded to several UK for-profit educational institutions known collectively as the LSBF Group, and including the London College of Contemporary Arts (LCCA) and the Language Gallery (formerly the LSBF School of English). After the market reforms of post-secondary education introduced by UK higher education minister David Willetts in 2011, the LSBF group rapidly expanded its student numbers. Etingen added St Patrick's College, London to his portfolio when his company Interactive World Wide Limited purchased the college in 2012. In 2013, LSBF won the Queen's Award for Enterprise for its contribution to UK trade.

Etingen established Global University Systems in 2013. Its UK business model relied on access to state-funded loans for student tuition fees, which since 2010 was a model for privatizing English higher education. GUS was incorporated in the Netherlands as a Besloten vennootschap (or BV) and in turn became the owner of the LSBF Group institutions and St Patrick's College through Dutch holding companies. While BVs are required to produce financial statements and file them with the Dutch KvK, the Netherlands has a favourable tax regime compared to the UK.

This led to further calls in 2017 for scrutiny of Dutch-incorporated private colleges and universities in the UK. GUS's expansion continued over the next three years with the acquisition of the German business school GISMA (now Gisma University of Applied Sciences) in 2013, University Canada West in 2014, and The University of Law in the UK, in 2015. All three were in financial difficulty at the time of their acquisition.

Concerns about the standards at both St Patrick's College and LSBF led to the UK government suspending their Tier 4 licences in 2015. Following the suspensions, Global University Systems announced plans for a two-year restructuring process of the group's UK holdings to begin in mid-2016. According to John Cox, former director of organisational development at GUS, the plan involved LSBF and its LCCA division coming under a new vocational entity offering only diploma courses, short courses and corporate training products. The vocational courses delivered by St Patrick's College and the Birmingham-based Finance Business Training would also come under this division. The University of Law was to become the sole provider of academic qualifications and professional qualifications, including the master's degrees previously offered by the LSBF Group. However, as of 2019 LSBF was still offering master's degrees awarded by the International Telematic University and Geneva Business School. There were no programmes provided or validated by the University of Law.

Between 2016 and 2018 GUS acquired further for-profit education institutions and companies, including the UK-based Arden University from Capella Education; IBAT College Dublin; the Israeli test-preparation company HighQ; Israeli college INT college; Laureate Germany with its subsidiary institutions University of Applied Sciences Europe and Laureate Academies GmbH; and R3 Education, a Devens, Massachusetts-headquartered operator of medical schools in the Caribbean.

In July 2019, Global University Systems bought Pearl Academy and University of Petroleum and Energy Studies in India from Laureate International Universities.

Global University Systems was awarded the title of 'Private Education Group of the Year' by Education Investor Awards 2019.

In May 2020, GUS expanded its portfolio by acquiring Trebas Institute, a provider of music, film, business, technology, and management programmes with campuses in Toronto and Montreal, Canada.

== Business ==
As of 2026, the company states that it has a recruiting network of "over 6,000 recruitment partners" with over "11,000 employees" for its colleges and universities, from more than 175 countries. According to Moody's Investors Service, the company was deriving approximately 27% of its revenues in 2018 "from leveraging its agent network and marketing capabilities predominantly to source students for third-party institutions."

== Institutions and network ==
=== Canada ===
- Canadian College of Technology and Business (career college, established 2021)
- Fleming College Toronto (Partnership with Fleming College and GUS owned Trebas Institute)
- Toronto School of Management (career college, established 2009)
- Trebas Institute (acquired 2020)
- University Canada West (acquired 2014)
- University of Niagara Falls Canada (established in 2024)

=== Caribbean ===
- Saba University School of Medicine
- Medical University of the Americas
- St. Matthew's University

=== Germany ===
- Berlin School of Business and Innovation (BSBI, offers degrees validated by International Telematic University, established 2017)
- Gisma University of Applied Sciences (formerly GISMA Business School) (acquired 2013)
- HTK Academy of Design (acquired 2018)
- University of Europe for Applied Sciences (acquired 2018)

=== India ===
- Pearl Academy (acquired 2019)
- UPES (University of Petroleum and Energy Studies, acquired 2019)

=== Ireland ===
- IBAT College Dublin (acquired 2016)

=== Israel ===
- HighQ (test preparation company preparing Israeli students for language, matriculation, and university entrance psychometric examinations, acquired 2017)
- Institute of Technology and Innovation (also known as INT college), training college specialising in the high-tech industry, acquired 2018)

=== Malaysia ===
- London School of Business and Finance Malaysia (established 2024)

=== Singapore ===
- London School of Business and Finance

=== United Arab Emirates ===
- University of Europe for Applied Sciences Dubai (UE Dubai), established 2024

=== United Kingdom ===
- Arden University (acquired 2016)
- FutureLearn (acquired 2022)
- InterActive Pro Ltd. (provider of online education services, established 2008)
- London Academy of Trading (provider of financial trading education, majority shareholding acquired in 2014)
- London College of Contemporary Arts (LCCA, established 2011)
  - London College of Contemporary Music (formerly London College of Creative Media) (LCCM, acquired 2018)
- London School of Business and Finance (LSBF, established 2003)
- St Patrick's College, London (acquired 2012)
- The Language Gallery (trading name of Accent Language Ltd., formerly the LSBF School of English, established 2008)
- The University of Law (acquired 2015)
