= Grenoble Graduate School of Business =

Grenoble Graduate School of Business (GGSB) is an educational institution within Grenoble Ecole de Management; it is internationally focused, and is the English language division of the business school. It is situated in the Europole area, next to the World Trade Center of Grenoble. Grenoble Ecole de Management is one of the few business schools (1% of schools worldwide) to possess the three accreditations that distinguish the leading international business schools: European Quality Improvement System (EQUIS), The Association to Advance Collegiate Schools of Business (AACSB) and The Association of MBAs (AMBA).

Its international programs in particular have been well ranked by the international business press. It garners its international reputation mainly from the prestigious Master of International Business (MIB) program which has been ranked 38th Best Master in Management in the world by the Financial Times (FT) in 2020 and the Master of Science in Finance which has been ranked 16th worldwide in the Financial Times 2020 Masters in Finance pre-experience ranking.
