= Neerja Bhatla =

Indian gynecologist and obstetrician

Dr. Neerja Bhatla
- Born: India
- Citizenship: Indian
- Education: All India Institute of Medical Sciences
- Known for: Cervical cancer prevention, FIGO staging revision
- Awards: Padma Shri (2025); Dr. S.K. Ghai Bhandari Award; ISCCP Excellence Award; Women’s Leadership Conclave Award
- Scientific career
- Fields: Gynecology, Obstetrics, Gynaecologic oncology
- Workplaces: All India Institute of Medical Sciences, New Delhi; National Cancer Institute, Jhajjar

Neerja Bhatla is an Indian gynecologist and obstetrician. She was conferred the Padma Shri in 2025, one of India’s highest civilian honours, in recognition of her contributions to women's healthcare.

She became the first Indian to serve as president of the International Federation of Gynaecology and Obstetrics (FIGO) and led the 2018 revision of FIGO’s staging guidelines for cervical cancer.

== Career ==
Bhatla has worked extensively for over three decades in the field of cervical cancer prevention, particularly focusing on low-resource settings. After completing her MBBS and post-graduation in Obstetrics and Gynaecology, she joined the faculty at the Department of Obstetrics and Gynaecology, All India Institute of Medical Sciences, New Delhi. She also served as the Head of Gynaecologic Oncology at the National Cancer Institute in Jhajjar under AIIMS.

Her scholarly work includes significant contributions to peer-reviewed journals, particularly in gynecologic oncology and public health. She was a lead author in research on cervical cancer prevention strategies in India.

== Awards and recognition ==
She has received multiple recognitions for her clinical and academic contributions, including:

- Dr. S.K. Ghai Bhandari Award from the All India Coordination Committee of the Royal College of Obstetrics and Gynaecology
- ISCCP Excellence Award from the Indian Society of Colposcopy and Cervical Pathology
- Women’s Leadership Conclave Award
