= Japanese torpedo boat Sagi =

Two Japanese warships have borne the name Sagi:

- Japanese torpedo boat Sagi (1903), a Hayabusa-class torpedo boat launched in 1903 and stricken in 1923
- Japanese torpedo boat Sagi (1937), an Ōtori-class torpedo boat launched in 1937 and sunk in 1944
