= University of Europe for Applied Sciences =

Private, for-profit university in Germany

- Former name: University of Applied Sciences Europe (2017–2020)
- Established: 2017
- Rector: Maurits van Rooijen
- Location: Iserlohn, Berlin, Potsdam, Hamburg and Dubai
- Owner: GUS Germany GmbH
- Website: www.ue-germany.com

The University of Europe for Applied Sciences, shortened as UE, is a private university of applied sciences in Germany with its main campus and administrative headquarters in Iserlohn and further campuses in Berlin, Potsdam, Hamburg and Dubai.

It was formed in 2017 as the University of Applied Sciences Europe by a merger of the Business and Information Technology School and the Berliner Technische Kunsthochschule. The university was previously owned by the American company Laureate Education and was acquired by Global University Systems in 2018. In October 2020, the university changed its name to University of Europe for Applied Sciences.

== Merged and affiliated institutions ==
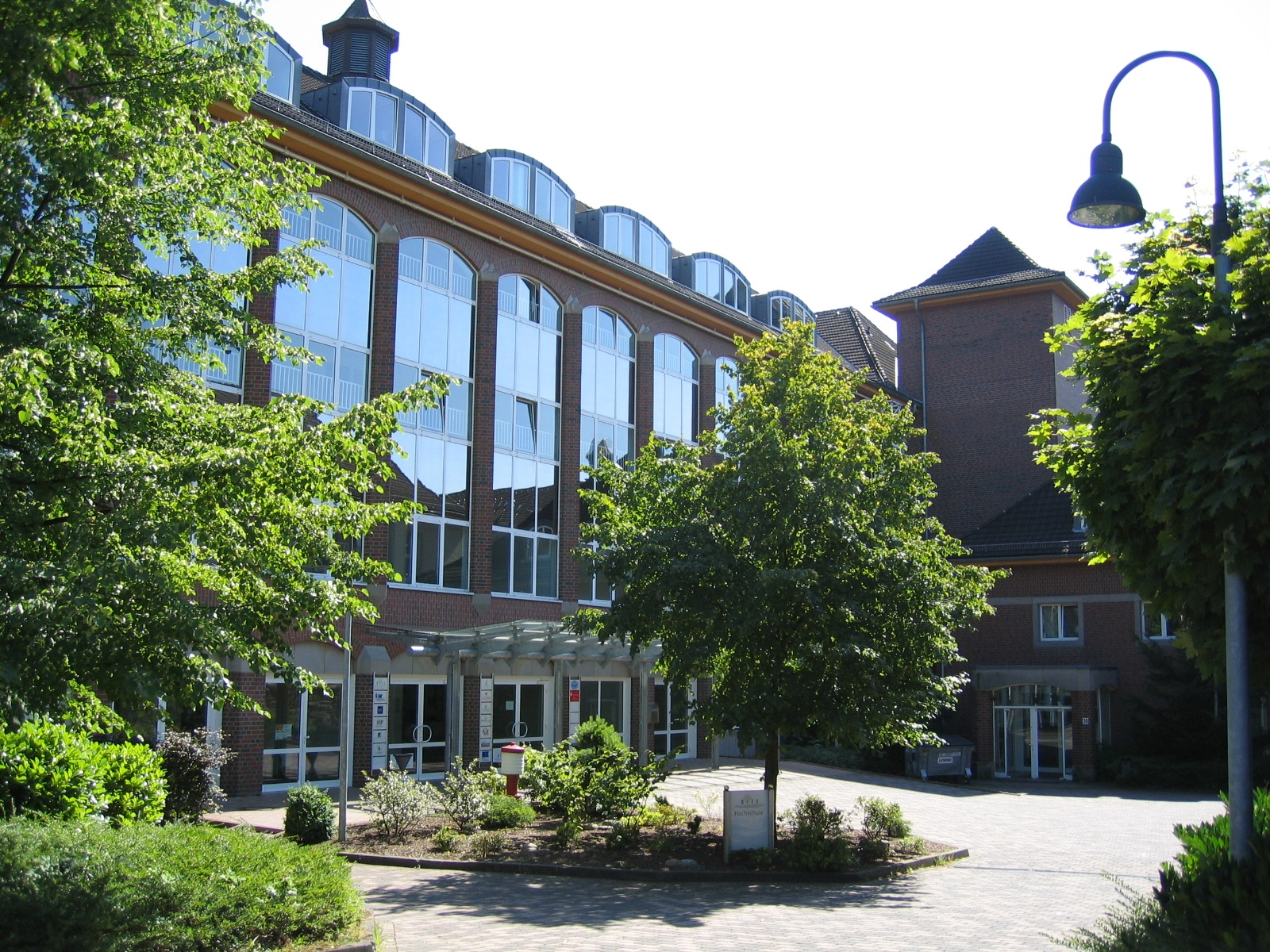
UE's Iserlohn campus

=== Business and Information Technology School ===
Before its merger into what is now the University of Europe for Applied Sciences, the Business and Information Technology School (known informally as BiTS) was a state-approved, private higher education college (Hochschule). It was founded in 2000 by the German entrepreneur and author Dietrich Walther. The college's first and main campus was in a former British military hospital in Iserlohn. Initially, it taught business administration with a special emphasis on entrepreneurship, but over the years more and more subjects were added and the number of students grew steadily. In 2008, BiTS was bought by Laureate Education and established branches in Berlin in 2012 and Hamburg in 2013. In 2013 it had a total enrollment of approximately 1800 students, but by 2016 its numbers had begun to fall. It was at this point that Laureate Education initiated its merger with another Laureate-owned college, Berliner Technische Kunsthochschule, into the University of Applied Sciences Europe. Laureate then began looking for a buyer for the newly formed institution. Alumni of the Business and Information Technology School include the German politician Paul Ziemiak.

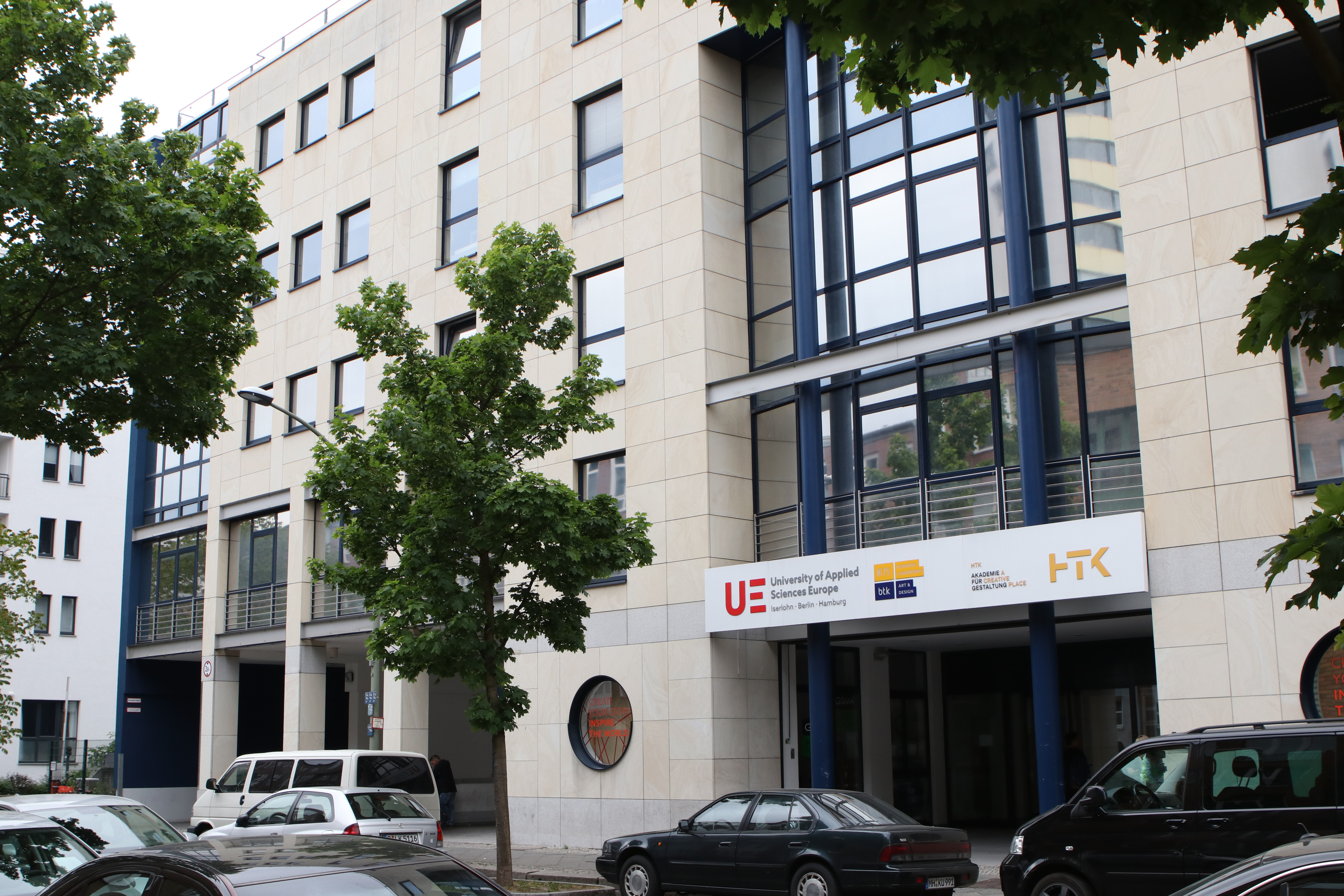
UE's Berlin campus

=== Berliner Technische Kunsthochschule ===
Also known as BTK, the Berliner Technische Kunsthochschule was a private, state-approved university for training designers located on Bernburger Straße in Berlin. It specialised in the interface of design, art, and new media. BTK was founded in 2006 by four individuals and received its initial accreditation in 2009. It was bought by Laureate Education in 2011. Following the acquisition, two further branches were established in Iserlohn in 2012 and Hamburg in 2013. In the 2013–14 academic year it had an enrollment of 502 students, 479 on its five bachelor's programmes and 23 on its master's programme. By the time of its merger into the University of Applied Sciences in 2017, BTK had added a bachelor's degree in video game design and a master's degree in photography. Several of its programmes had both German and English-language versions.

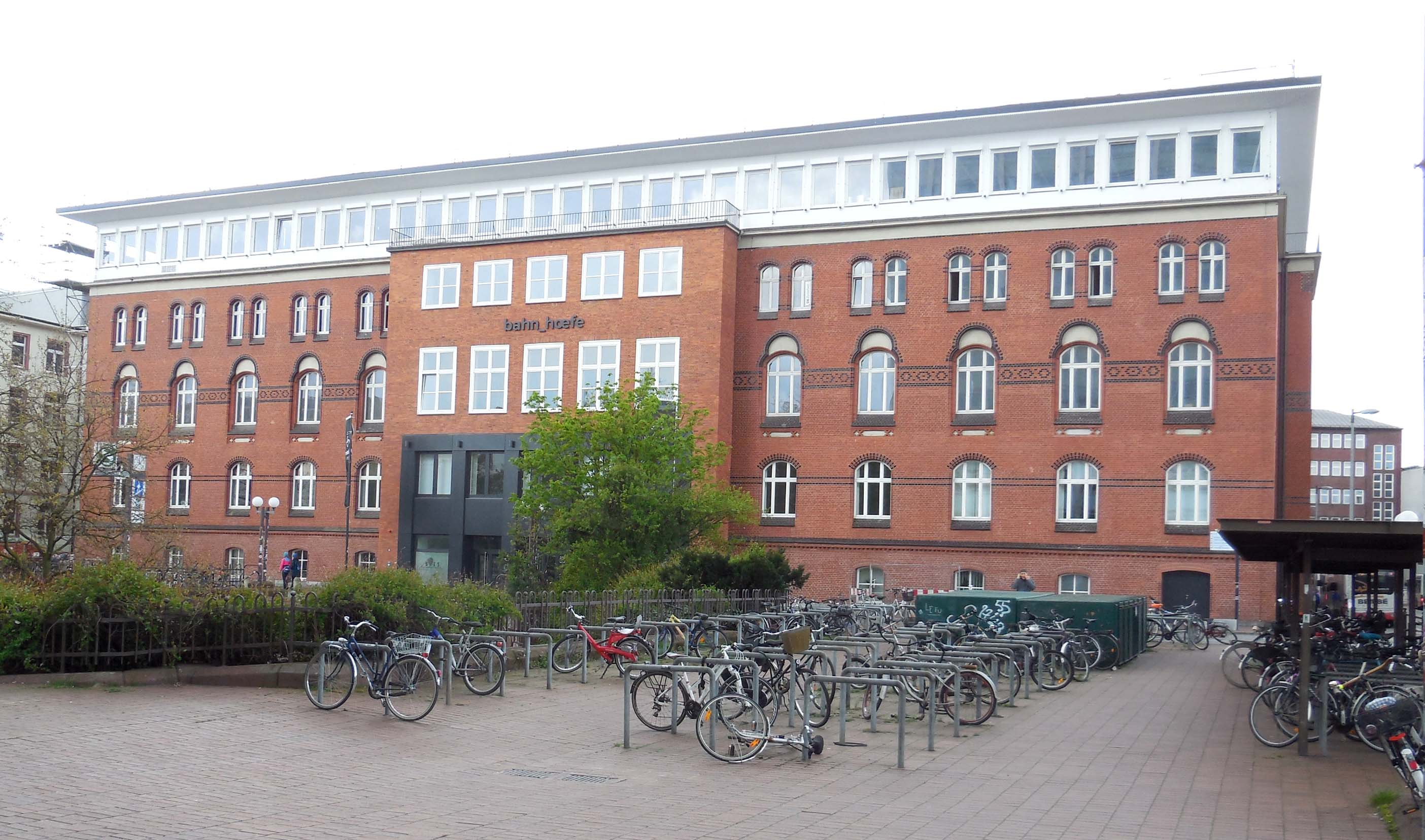
UE's Hamburg campus

=== htk academy ===
htk academy is a private, state-approved vocational school that specialises in training across a variety of creative fields, including Game Creation, Communication Design, Illustration Design, 3D Animation, and, most recently, Social Media Design. It was founded in Hamburg in 1987 as the Hamburger Technische Kunstschule. It is closely affiliated to the University of Europe for Applied Sciences, a relationship that has continued from its affiliation with the Berliner Technische Kunsthochschule (BTK) which began in 2016. htk academy's main campus is located on Paul Dessau Straße, which is in an up-and-coming area of Hamburg, Bahrenfeld. Like BTK, HTK was bought by Laureate Education in 2011. It was subsequently acquired by Global University Systems in 2018 at the same time the company purchased the University of Applied Sciences Europe.

== Programmes ==
The university has three faculties:

- Business and Psychology, originally taught at the Business and Information Technology School
- Sport, Media, and Event Management, originally taught at the Business and Information Technology School
- Art and Design, originally taught at the Berliner Technische Kunsthochschule

Together, they offer a number of undergraduate and post-graduate degrees, some of which are taught in English. The degree programmes are accredited by FIBAA and ZEvA.

== Campuses ==
- Iserlohn, located at Reiterweg 26B near the shores of Lake Seilersee, the original campus of the Business and Information Technology School (BiTS), and the administrative headquarters of UE
- Berlin, located at Dessauer Straße 3–5 in the Kreuzberg district near the original campus of the Berliner Technische Kunsthochschule (BTK)
- Hamburg, opened in 2014 and located at Museumstraße 39 in the Altona district near the Altona train station and the River Elbe
- Innovation HUB Potsdam, The campus offers technology focused programmes in a modern and state-of-the-art building. Located at Konrad-Zuse-Ring 11 Potsdam.
- Dubai, the most recent campus

== See also ==
- Fachhochschule (the German term for universities of applied sciences in general)
