= Sagi Hartov =

Israeli musician (born 1978)

- שגיא הרטוב
- Born: Israel
- Occupations: classical cellist; academic administrator

Sagi Hartov (Hebrew: שגיא הרטוב) is a cellist born in Israel with dual British and Israeli citizenship. He is the founder of the Ernest Bloch classical competition.

Hartov has been a member of the London Mozart Trio. He also serves as principal of creative arts for Global University Systems. He is executive dean and managing director at London College of Contemporary Arts, and managing director of Berlin School of Business and Innovation, both subsidiaries of Global University Systems.

== Career ==
Sagi Hartov started studying the cello when he was 10 years old. He studied at the Rubin Conservatorium in Haifa, and at the age of 15 performed with the Haifa Symphony Orchestra.

Between 1995 and 1999, Hartov studied under Uzi Wiesel, initially at Tel Aviv University and then at the Sydney Conservatorium of Music. He was also taught by Aldo Parisot, János Starker and Mats Lidström.

In September 2000, Hartov moved to the UK to study at the Royal Academy of Music, and became an LRAM.

Hartov has taught Master's degrees and masterclasses at the Birmingham Conservatoire, the Yehudi Menuhin School, and the Cambridge Performance Masterclass program. He has also taught at the North London Colourstrings Centre.

== Awards and performances ==
Sagi Hartov has performed in over 12 countries. He played a solo recital with Benjamin Frith at the Wigmore Hall and a concert with Argentinian pianist Alberto Portugheis at the Regent Hall.

Hartov has taken part in festivals such as the Broomhill Festival and the Gentse Feesten in Belgium. In 2001 he participated in the first round the Rostropovich International Cello Competition in Paris. He represented the String Department in the Finals of the RAM Club Prize, where he opened the new David Josefowitz Recital Hall.

Hartov has recorded advertisement soundtracks. He has also recorded for the BBC's Channel 1, and Radios 3 and 4, as well as the Universal Records.

In 2007 and 2008, Hartov established the Israeli Music and the Ernest Bloch competitions. In 2010, the Israeli Music Competition had 140 competitors from 48 different countries.

For a time Hartov played with the London Mozart Trio and appears on their 2011 recording of Rachmaninov's Trios élégiaques.
