= University Canada West =

University in Canada

University Canada West (UCW)
- Type: Private, for-profit
- Established: 2005; 21 years ago
- Chair: Cyndi McLeod
- President: Bashir Makhoul
- Faculty: 412
- Students: 7,000
- Location: Vancouver (2 campuses), British Columbia
- Campus: Urban
- Owner: Global University Systems
- Colors: Red and white
- Website: www.ucanwest.ca

University Canada West (UCW) is a private, for-profit university in British Columbia, Canada. It was founded in 2005 by David F. Strong, the former president of the University of Victoria. UCW was purchased in 2008 by the Eminata Group and in 2014 sold to Global University Systems, its present owners. Based in downtown Vancouver, the university offers undergraduate and graduate programs in business and management.

As of 2023, with nearly 14,000 international study permits, it is second only to Conestoga College for the number of permits for post-secondary institutions in Canada; foreign students account for over 96% of its enrolled students. In April 2026, it laid off approximately 30% of its workforce, citing a steep decline in enrolment of international students.

== History ==
=== Initial years (2005 – 2008) ===
University Canada West was founded as a for-profit university by David Strong, the former president of the University of Victoria, and a group of investors. It was intended to cater to British Columbian students who had been turned away from the province's public universities as well as the Asian Pacific market and had projected an eventual enrolment of 3000 students. The establishment of the university marked the first time in British Columbia that a for-profit institution had been authorized to use the designation "university," the result of the province's recently enacted, controversial Degree Authorization Act. UCW was approved in 2004 and opened its doors in 2005 in the former Blanshard Elementary School in Victoria, British Columbia. It initially offered undergraduate degrees in commerce, communications, geography, tourism, and economics and a master's degree in business. However, the geography, tourism, and economics programs were later dropped.

In an effort to expand its program offerings, UCW bought Victoria College of Art in 2006. The intention was to start a Bachelor in Fine Arts degree. However, after the takeover, enrolment at the art college dropped drastically from 150 students to 12. The university subsequently withdrew its request to the British Columbia Degree Quality Assessment Board for approval for the new degree. UCW opened a second campus in Vancouver in 2008.

=== Eminata Group ownership (2008 – 2014) ===
In 2008, the university was sold to the Eminata Group. At the time of the sale, it was reported that UCW was teetering on the edge of bankruptcy and struggling to attract students. Faced with declining enrolment at its Victoria campus, the university closed the site in February 2011. At the time of its closure the Victoria campus had only 24 students enrolled in academic degree programs. The announcement of the imminent closure was made one day after the deadline for a tuition refund had passed. The students were given the option of transferring to another college or to UCW's Vancouver campus. However, some students interviewed on CBC News said their preferred college was unwilling to transfer their UCW course credits, and they could not afford moving to Vancouver.

In March 2012, a two-part investigative feature in the British Columbian paper The Province reported on student complaints at UCW and two other Canadian colleges owned by Eminata. In October of that year, the Hindustan Times published an article reporting on interviews with over 30 students, graduates, faculty and former teachers and employees of UCW who "alleged that it [was] a university only in name, and that many of them were duped." The article noted that the university "vehemently" denied the allegations that the students were misled about the value of UCW degrees saying that it had many students who secured positions in industry and government, both in Canada and abroad. At the time of the article's publication, approximately 90% of UCW's students were from India. Earlier that year, when student complaints about UCW had begun to surface, India's Jawaharlal Nehru Technological University pulled out of a Memorandum of Understanding with UCW to jointly run an MBA exchange programme.

UCW's founder David Strong had been replaced as the university's president in December 2009. He was succeeded by Verna Magee-Shepherd, a former acting president of British Columbia Institute of Technology. Magee-Shepherd resigned in March 2012, and four months later Arthur Coren was named UCW's new president and vice-chancellor. Coren was previously the dean of Kwantlen Polytechnic University's business school.

=== Global University Systems ownership (2014 – present) ===
Eminata sold University Canada West to the Netherlands-based company Global University Systems in November 2014 at which time it had approximately 400 students enrolled in its in-person and online programs. According to a 2017 interview with Coren in The PIE News (an industry publication for the international education sector), the university's enrolment had increased since 2014 with 80% of its students coming from outside Canada. UCW had 52 graduates in the class of 2018. Of these, 14 came from India, 4 from the Middle East, 9 from the Far East, 10 from Canada, 7 from Africa, 4 from the Middle East, 4 from Europe, and 4 from Central and South America. The majority of the graduates were on the MBA program. Since then, the university has grown exponentially, with over 7,000 students from over 100 countries as of September 2025.

In 2019, Brock Dykeman was named new president of the university. In October 2023, Bashir Makhoul, President and Vice-Chancellor at the University for the Creative Arts (UCA) in the United Kingdom was named the university's new president and Vice-Chancellor, replacing Sheldon Levy.

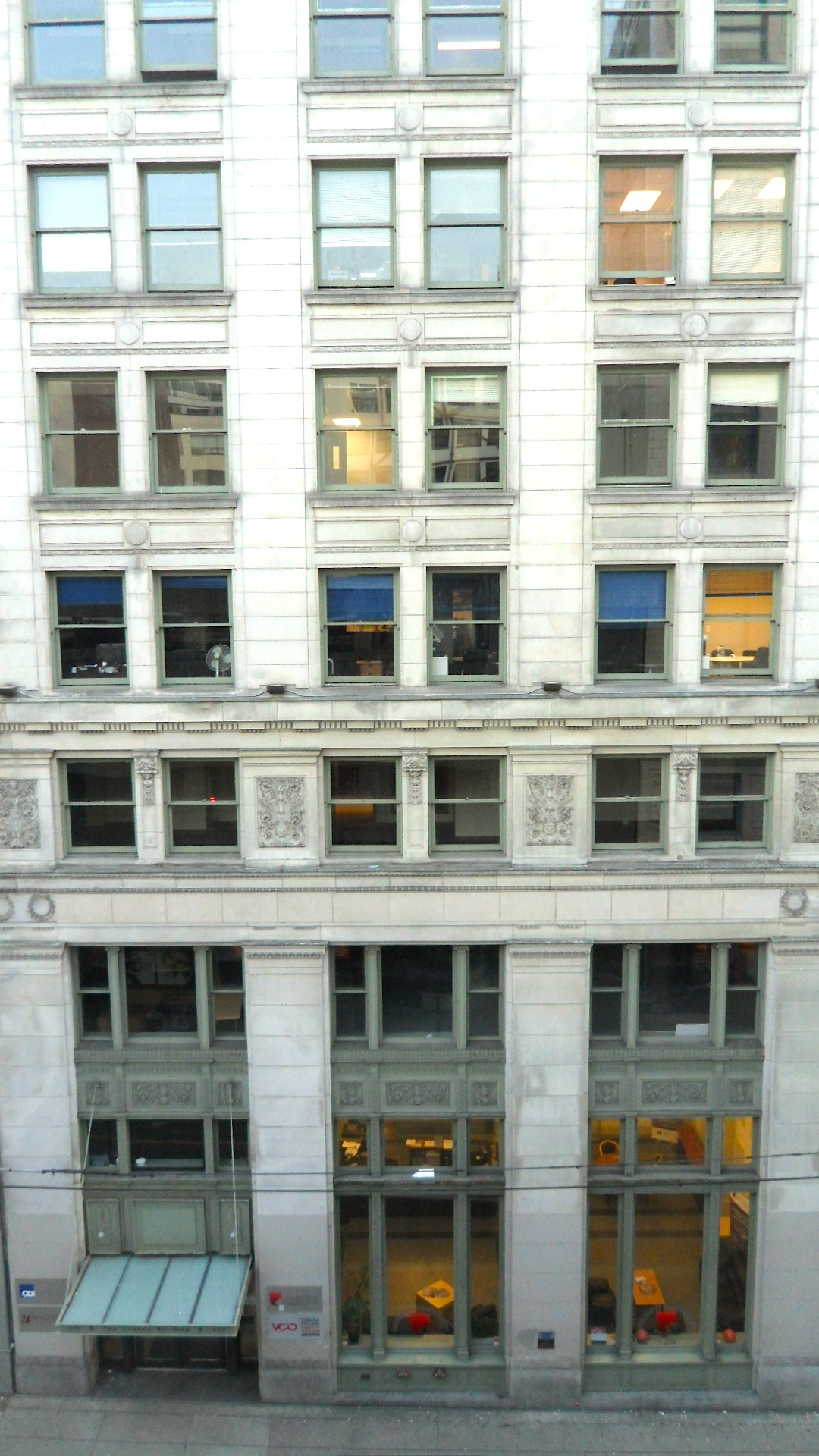
The London Building, site of the UCW West Pender campus

In 2023, University Canada West accounted for 13,913 international study permits, more than any other post-secondary institution in British Columbia, and more than any other institution in Canada other than Conestoga College. This means, of their 14485 students, only 572 (4% of the total student body) were not on international study permits.

In April 2026, UCW abruptly laid off 240 staff and faculty (approximately 30% of all employees), stating that "the government’s decision to reduce the number of international study permits has significantly impacted student enrolment at University Canada West, posing substantial challenges to our university operations." A laid-off professor reported being immediately locked out of access to school systems for an ongoing course, "despite having a full roster of students enrolled for the spring term," while the university claimed to have "ensured that these layoffs do not impact our academic programs and the student experience."

== Campus ==
Earlier sited on two floors of an office building on Melville Street in downtown Vancouver, the university relocated in 2014 to the nearby London Building. The 10-storey London Building is located at 626 West Pender Street and was originally built in 1912 for the London and British North American Company.

University Canada West opened a new second campus, Vancouver House, in October 2020, which can accommodate up to 3,400 students. The Vancouver House campus is part of Vancouver House development, which was named by CNN in 2019 as one of the most anticipated buildings set to shape the world in 2020.

== Ranking ==
In 2021, University Canada West received a 5-star QS Stars rating, an opt-in evaluation service that require the institution to pay a fee to be rated. University Canada West is not on the list of QS World University Rankings, as it is outside the top 1,500.

== Governance ==
In line with the bicameral system at many other Canadian universities, the governance structure of UCW is composed of an Academic Council and a Board of Governors. The Board of Governors oversees the strategic direction of the university including its fiduciary, legal and financial responsibilities. It is composed of two members nominated by Global University Systems (the university's owner), the university's president, and a minimum of four members external to both the university and its owner. As of 2018, the Board of Governors was chaired by Alfred Morris. He also serves on the board of directors at two other institutions owned by Global University Systems, Arden University and University of Law. The Academic Council oversees the university's academic programs and policies. It is composed of representatives from the university's staff, faculty, students and alumni.

== Academics ==
The university is accredited by the British Columbia Ministry of Post-Secondary Education and Future Skills, and carries the Education Quality Assurance (EQA) accreditation under the 2003 Degree Authorization Act. The university is also a member of the British Columbia Council on Admission & Transfer. In 2017 the university's bachelors and post-graduate business degrees received accreditation by the Accreditation Council for Business Schools and Programs (ACBSP).

As of 2019 UCW offers a Bachelor of Commerce, a Bachelor of Arts in Business Communication, and an MBA. The mode of study for these degrees is either full-time on campus or part-time online. It also offers an Associate of Arts degree.
