= Università telematica internazionale Uninettuno =

University in Rome, Italy

Coordinates: 41.8962°N 12.4775°E

UniNettuno University
- Università telematica internazionale UniNettuno
- Motto: In the future, since ever.
- Type: Private, distance-learning
- Established: 2005
- President: Prof. Maria Amata Garito
- Rector: Prof. Maria Amata Garito
- Location: Rome, Italy
- Website: www.uninettunouniversity.net

The UniNettuno University (Italian: Università telematica internazionale UniNettuno), often simply abbreviated as "UniNettuno" is a private university based in Rome, Italy, which provides e-learning courses via a consortium of 43 universities, companies, and public bodies. It was founded in 2005 with the approval of the Italian government.

Its overall world rank according to SCImago Institutions Rankings is 32nd, while compared to other universities, and based on a percentile assessment. There are international agreements by UniNettuno with other universities and ministries in the world, including Poland, China, Greece, Colombia, Romania, Morocco, Algeria, Singapore and Dubai among others. There are students enrolled in UniNettuno from more than 160 countries across the world.

== Metaverse University ==
There is a metaverse based form of the university in use by UniNettuno. The president of UniNettuno has said, "We are already using and expanding the University of the Metaverse, a 3D space called the Island of Knowledge. Our students, who come from 167 different countries around the world, connect on the platform via their avatars... No more the classic one-way teaching method will be in use... Another wonderful aspect of our Island of Knowledge is that we can reproduce any location. We have given numerous lessons, for example, in the great classroom of the Sorbonne in Paris that we have reconstructed into virtual reality." She considers UniNettuno's Island of Knowledge to be "the future" of the university.

== Notable courses ==
=== Master of Science in Health Management ===
International Telematic University Uninettuno introduced Master of Science in Health Management program to be able to deliver the knowledge and skills to people who are interested in health sector. The focus is on health management in a global and local environment and the program attracts on a growing body of knowledge and proof to enable evaluations throughout various countries.

In 2015 International Telematic University Uninettuno signed the agreement with James Lind Institute. This agreement is part of global collaboration supporting the Master in Health Management and an option of Advanced PG Diplomas, alongside the progression of shared academic paths. James Lind Institute is a Singapore based institute offering various online programs in clinical research and Healthcare area and it has students from more than 40 nations.

== See also ==
- List of Italian universities
- Distance education
