= List of business schools in Australia =

The following is a list of business schools in Australia organised by state and territory.

== Australian Capital Territory ==
- AIM Business School - Australian Institute of Management Education and Training
- ANU College of Business and Economics - Australian National University
- National Graduate School of Management - Australian National University (postgraduate)
- University of Canberra Faculty of Business and Government - University of Canberra
- University of Canberra School of Business and Government - University of Canberra (postgraduate)

== New South Wales ==
- Australian Catholic University Faculty of Arts and Sciences (Schools of Business) - Australian Catholic University
- AIM Business School - Australian Institute of Management Education and Training
- Australian Graduate School of Management - University of New South Wales (postgraduate)
- UNSW Business School - University of New South Wales
- Charles Sturt University Faculty of Business - Charles Sturt University
- International College of Management, Sydney
- Le Cordon Bleu, Sydney
- Kaplan Business School, Sydney
- Macleay College, Sydney
- Macquarie Graduate School of Management - Macquarie University (postgraduate)
- Macquarie University Faculty of Business and Economics - Macquarie University
- Newcastle Graduate School of Business - University of Newcastle (postgraduate)
- S P Jain School of Global Management, Sydney
- Southern Cross Business School - Southern Cross University
- Sydney Business School - University of Wollongong (postgraduate)
- Sydney International School of Technology and Commerce
- UNE Business School - University of New England
- University of Newcastle Faculty of Business and Law - University of Newcastle
- University of Sydney Business School - University of Sydney
- UTS Business School - University of Technology, Sydney
- Sydney Graduate School of Management - Western Sydney University (postgraduate)
- Western Sydney University School of Business - Western Sydney University
- University of Wollongong Faculty of Commerce - University of Wollongong

== Northern Territory ==
- AIM Business School - Australian Institute of Management Education and Training
- Charles Darwin University Faculty of Law, Business and Arts - Charles Darwin University
- Charles Darwin University School of Law and Business - Charles Darwin University (postgraduate)

== Queensland ==
- AIM Business School - Australian Institute of Management Education and Training
- Australian Catholic University Faculty of Arts & Sciences (Schools of Business) - Australian Catholic University
- Bond University Faculty of Business, Technology and Sustainable Development - Bond University
- Bond University School of Business - Bond University (postgraduate)
- Brisbane Graduate School of Business - Queensland University of Technology (postgraduate)
- Central Queensland University Faculty of Business and Informatics - Central Queensland University
- Griffith Business School - Griffith University (postgraduate)
- Griffith University Faculty of Business - Griffith University
- James Cook University Faculty of Law, Business and the Creative Arts - James Cook University
- James Cook University School of Business - James Cook University (postgraduate)
- Kaplan Business School, Brisbane
- Le Cordon Bleu, Brisbane
- Queensland University of Technology Faculty of Business - Queensland University of Technology
- Rhodes Business School (Australia) - Rhodes Business School (Australia)
- Southern Cross University Business School - Southern Cross University
- University of Queensland Faculty of Business, Economics & Law - University of Queensland
- University of Southern Queensland Faculty of Business - University of Southern Queensland
- University of the Sunshine Coast Faculty of Business - University of the Sunshine Coast
- University of the Sunshine Coast School of Management - University of the Sunshine Coast (postgraduate)
- UQ Business School - University of Queensland (postgraduate)
- USQ Australian Graduate School of Business - University of Southern Queensland (postgraduate)

== South Australia ==
- AIB Business School - Australian Institute of Business
- AIM Business School - Australian Institute of Management Education and Training
- Flinders Business - Flinders University (postgraduate)
- Flinders University College of Business, Government and Law - Flinders University
- International Graduate School of Business - University of South Australia (postgraduate)
- International Institute of Business and Information Technology , Federation University Australia
- Kaplan Business School, Adelaide
- Le Cordon Bleu at Regency Park, Adelaide
- University of Adelaide Business School - University of Adelaide (postgraduate)
- University of Adelaide Faculty of the Professions - University of Adelaide
- University of South Australia Division of Business - University of South Australia

== Tasmania ==
- AIM Business School - Australian Institute of Management Education and Training
- Tasmanian School of Business and Economics - University of Tasmania
- University of Tasmania Graduate School of Management - University of Tasmania (postgraduate)

== Victoria ==
- AIM Business School - Australian Institute of Management Education and Training
- Australian Catholic University Faculty of Arts & Sciences (Schools of Business) - Australian Catholic University
- Australian Graduate School of Entrepreneurship - Swinburne University (postgraduate)
- Charles Sturt University Study Centres - Charles Sturt University (undergraduate and postgraduate)
- Chifley Business School - Chifley Business School (postgraduate)
- Deakin Business School - Deakin University (postgraduate)
- Deakin University Faculty of Business and Law - Deakin University
- Kaplan Business School, Melbourne
- La Trobe University Faculty of Law and Management (School of Business) - La Trobe University
- Le Cordon Bleu, Melbourne
- Macleay College, Melbourne
- Melbourne Business School - University of Melbourne (postgraduate)
- Monash Faculty of Business and Economics - Monash University
- Monash Graduate School of Business - Monash University (postgraduate)
- RMIT University College of Business - RMIT University
- Swinburne Business School - Swinburne University
- University of Ballarat School of Business - University of Ballarat
- Victoria Graduate School of Business - Victoria University (postgraduate)
- Victoria University Faculty of Business and Law - Victoria University

== Western Australia ==
- AIM Business School - Australian Institute of Management Education and Training
- Curtin Business School - Curtin University of Technology
- Edith Cowan University Faculty of Business and Law - Edith Cowan University
- Murdoch Business School - Murdoch University (postgraduate)
- Murdoch University Faculty of Law and Business - Murdoch University
- Perth Graduate School of Business- Edith Cowan University (postgraduate)
- University of Notre Dame Business School - University of Notre Dame
- UWA Business School - University of Western Australia

== See also ==
Lists of business school, other continents

- List of business schools in Africa
- List of business schools in Asia
- List of business schools in Europe
- List of business schools in the United States
