= Kaplan (surname) =

Family name

Kaplan is a surname that is of ultimately Latin origins. There is a Turkish surname of different origin.

== Etymology ==
In European languages, the word originates from the Latin term, capellanus or cappellanus, an office given to persons appointed to watch over the sacred cloak (cappa or capella) of St Martin of Tours. Its derivations were then found in many other European languages, including Yiddish, German, English, French, Czech, Polish, Norwegian, Croatian, and Hungarian.

The French form derived from the old Norman French word "caplain", which gave the old French and medieval English word "chapelain", both meaning "charity priest", who was a priest who was endowed to sing Mass daily on behalf of the souls of the dead. Hence the name is an occupational name for a clergyman or perhaps a servant of one. From there the word and name spread. Modern variations on Kaplan include Caplan, Chaplain, Chapling, Caplen, Copland, Kapelan, and Kaplin.

The name is popular in Turkey, where the meaning of Kaplan is tiger.

In German the term Kaplan means chaplain or curate. The word is extant in other languages as well, for example in Polish where the term kapłan translates as priest, in Hungarian 'káplán' means a priest of the royal court or that of an aristocrat; in Norwegian where it also has the meaning of priest while retaining the original, elongated form.

Kaplan or Caplan is also a surname common among Ashkenazi Jews, usually indicating descent from the priestly lineage (the kohanim), similar to the etymological origin of the common Hebrew surname Cohen. Not all Jews bearing this name belong to the priestly caste; at one time in the Russian Empire male Jews other than priests were required to join the Russian army for 25 years, and a number changed their surnames to Kaplan in the hope of gaining exemption from military service.

== Notable people ==
- Abraham Kaplan, American philosopher
- Ahmet Kaplan (born 2002), Turkish wheelchair tennis player
- Ahmetcan Kaplan, Turkish footballer
- Abraham Kohen Kaplan, Russian writer
- Alice Kaplan, American literary critic, translator, historian, and educator
- Anatoly Kaplan, Russian artist and painter
- Andreas Kaplan, German professor of marketing
- Anna Kaplan (born 1975), American politician
- Arie Kaplan, American writer
- Artie Kaplan, American recording artist, songwriter and a session musician
- Aryeh Kaplan, American rabbi
- Avriel Kaplan, American singer in Pentatonix
- Avrohom Eliyahu Kaplan, Lithuanian rabbi
- Benjamin Kaplan (1911–2010), American copyright and procedure scholar and jurist
- Benjamin Kaplan (1929-2012), English pianist
- Benjamin J. Kaplan (born 1960), historian
- Benjamin R. Kaplan (born 1977), economist
- Bob Kaplan, Canadian politician
- Bruce Eric Kaplan, American cartoonist and satirist
- Cary Kaplan, sports marketer
- David Kaplan, multiple people
- Deborah Kaplan, American screenwriter and film director
- Deborah Kaplan (disability activist), American lawyer
- Dena Kaplan, South African-born Australian actress, singer, dancer, and DJ
- Devin Kaplan (born 2004), American NHL ice hockey player
- Dovid Kaplan, lecturer, author and speaker
- Edgar Kaplan (1925–1997), American bridge player
- Edith Kaplan, American lead creator of a neuropsychological test battery
- Elaine D. Kaplan, American judge
- Eliezer Kaplan, Israeli politician
- Fanny Kaplan, Russian revolutionary and attempted assassin of Lenin
- Felix Kaplan (1897–1989), American businessman and politician
- Fred Kaplan (biographer), American professor
- Fred Kaplan (journalist), American author and journalist
- Gabe Kaplan, American actor, comedian, poker player
- Gilbert Kaplan (1941–2016), American businessman, journalist and conductor
- Gilbert B. Kaplan, American attorney and government official
- Gisela Kaplan, Australian sociologist and author
- Gregory Kaplan, American historian
- Hamit Kaplan (1934–1976), Turkish Olympic wrestler
- Harold Irwin Kaplan, American psychiatrist
- Harold S. Kaplan, Canadian architect
- Howard Kaplan, American singer better known as Howard Kaylan
- Ira Kaplan, American musician
- Irit Kaplan, Israeli actress
- Irving Kaplan (chemist), American chemist
- James Kaplan, American novelist, journalist, and biographer
- Jeff Kaplan (born 1972), American video game designer
- Jeffrey Kaplan (historian) (1954–2025), American academic and author
- JJ Kaplan (born 1997), American-Israeli basketball player
- Jon Kaplan, multiple people
- Jonathan Kaplan, American film producer
- Jonathan Kaplan (born 1966), South African rugby referee
- Jozef Kapláň (born 1986), Slovak football player
- Juliette Kaplan (1939–2019), British actress
- Julio Kaplan (born 1950), Puerto Rican chess player
- Justin Daniel "Joe" Kaplan (1925–2014), American writer and editor
- Karel Kaplan, Czech historian
- Kivie Kaplan, American businessman and philanthropist
- Kyle Kaplan, American actor
- Lance Kaplan, American engineer
- Lewis A. Kaplan, American lawyer and jurist
- Louis "Kid" Kaplan (1901–1970), Russian-born US boxer, world featherweight champion.
- Martin M. Kaplan (1915–2004), American virologist and public health official
- Marty Kaplan, American professor
- Mehmet Kaplan, Turkish-born Swedish politician
- Melissa Kaplan, musician/singer with Splashdown and Universal Hall Pass
- Melvin Kaplan, American oboist and founder of the Vermont Mozart Festival
- Metin Kaplan, leader of the Islamic extremist movement Kalifatsstaat ("Caliphate State")
- Michael Kaplan, American biologist
- Michael Kaplan, American costume designer
- Michel Kaplan, French Byzantinist
- Mordecai Kaplan, American rabbi, founder of Reconstructionist branch of Judaism
- Morton Kaplan, American political scientist
- Murat Kaplan
- Nachum Kaplan, Lithuanian preacher and philanthropist
- Nathan Kaplan (disambiguation), multiple persons
- Neil Kaplan, American voice actor, audiobook narrator, entertainer and comedian
- Nelly Kaplan, Argentine-born French writer and film maker
- Nomi Kaplan (born 1933), Lithuanian-Canadian photographer and artist
- Ori Kaplan, Israeli jazz saxophonist and music producer
- Perrin Kaplan
- Philip J. Kaplan, American entrepreneur and computer programmer
- Randall Kaplan, American businessman and investor
- Robert D. Kaplan, American journalist
- Robert S. Kaplan, American business school professor
- Ron Kaplan (born 1970), Israeli Olympic gymnast
- Sam Kaplan, author of The Pedagogical State
- Sam Kaplan (American football) (1898–1931), American NFL football player
- Samuel L. Kaplan (born 1936), American diplomat
- Şeydanur Kaplan (born 2000), Turkish paralympian goalball player
- Stanley Kaplan, American businessman
- Steve Kaplan
- Sybil Kaplan (1938-2023), American journalist and author
- Thomas Kaplan (born 1962), American investor and philanthropist
- Tomáš Kaplan (born 1978), Czech footballer
- Tomasz Kapłan (born 1984), Polish pool player
- Valery Kaplan (born 1943), Soviet speed skater
- Viktor Kaplan, Austrian inventor of the Kaplan turbine
- Vivian Jeanette Kaplan, Canadian author
- Yıldız Kaplan, Turkish model and pop singer
- Yisrael Mendel Kaplan, American Orthodox Jewish rabbi and author

== Fictional characters ==
- Billy Kaplan, superhero from Marvel Comics
- Ferdinand Kaplan, protagonist in U nás v Kocourkově, a 1934 Czechoslovak comedy film
- Hyman Kaplan, fictional character created by Leo Rosten
- William "Billy" Kaplan-Altman, known as "Wiccan," fictional comic book character
- Melissa Kaplan, one of the survivors of the fictional WHS Yellowjackets 1996 plane crash.

== See also ==
- Caplan
- Kaplan (disambiguation)
