= Caplen =

Caplen may refer to:

- Caplen, Texas, United States

== People with the surname ==
- Dan Caplen (born 1992), British R&B singer, songwriter and musician
- Natasha J. Caplen, British-American geneticist
- Tom Caplen (1879–1945), English cricketer

== See also ==
- Caplan (disambiguation)
- Kaplan (disambiguation)
