= Sydney Business School =

Sydney Business School may refer to:

- University of Sydney Business School, Sydney, Australia
- University of Wollongong Sydney Business School, Sydney, Australia
