= Kaplan =

Kaplan may refer to:

== Places ==
- Kapłań, Poland
- Kaplan, Louisiana, U.S.
- Kaplan Medical Center, a hospital in Rehovot, Israel
- Kaplan Street, in Tel Aviv, Israel
  - Kaplan Interchange, intersection well-known for protests
- Mount Kaplan, Antarctica
- Kaplan Arena, at the College of William & Mary in Williamsburg, Virginia

== Other uses ==
- Kaplan (surname), including a list of people with the name
- Kaplan College, now Brightwood College, a system of for-profit colleges in the United States
- Kaplan Centre, an institute located in Cape Town, South Africa dedicated to Jewish studies
- Kaplan Educational Foundation, a non-profit educational support entity
- Kaplan Foundation, dedicated to the music of Gustav Mahler
- Kaplan, Inc., a for-profit education company
  - Kaplan Business School, a subsidiary of Kaplan located in Australia
  - Kaplan Financial Education, a division of Kaplan, Inc.
  - Kaplan International Languages, a division of Kaplan, Inc.
  - Kaplan University, a former subsidiary of Kaplan, Inc., now known as Purdue University Global
- Kaplan turbine, a propeller-type water turbine

== See also ==
- Caplan (disambiguation)
- Caplen (disambiguation)
