= Caplan (disambiguation) =

Caplan is a surname.

Caplan may also refer to:

- Caplan, Quebec, Canada
  - Caplan station, a former train station
- Caplan's, a former department store in Ottawa, Ontario, Canada
- Caplan's syndrome, rheumatoid pneumoconiosis

== See also ==
- Caplen (disambiguation)
- Kaplan (disambiguation)
