= Caplan =

Caplan is a surname. Notable people with the surname include:

- Arthur Caplan, American bioethicist
- Ben Caplan, Canadian folk musician
- Bryan Caplan (born 1971), American economist
- David Caplan (born 1964–2019), Canadian politician
- Elinor Caplan (born 1944), Canadian politician
- Frank Caplan (1911–1988), American toymaker
- Fred H. Caplan (1914–2004), American judge from West Virginia
- Gerald Caplan (born 1938), Canadian political academic
- Irwin Caplan (1919–2007), American cartoonist
- Jane Caplan (born 1945), British academic historian of the Third Reich
- Lizzy Caplan (born 1982), American actress
- Melvyn Caplan, British politician
- Philip Caplan, Lord Caplan (1929–2008), Scottish lawyer and judge
- Ralph Caplan (1925–2020), American design consultant
- Twink Caplan, American actress

== Fictional characters ==
- Amanita Caplan, Sense8 character
- Logan Caplan, from the BBC Scotland soap opera River City
- Lou Caplan, from the BBC Scotland soap opera River City
- Sonny Caplan, from the BBC Scotland soap opera River City

== See also ==
- Kaplan (disambiguation)
- Kaplan (surname)
