= David Smiedt =

David Michael Smiedt is a South Africa-born, Sydney-based journalist, author, and comedian. He has written seven books, including From Russia With Lunch: A Lithuanian Odyssey, Are We There Yet: Chasing a Childhood Through South Africa and Boom Boom: 100 Years of Australian Comedy.

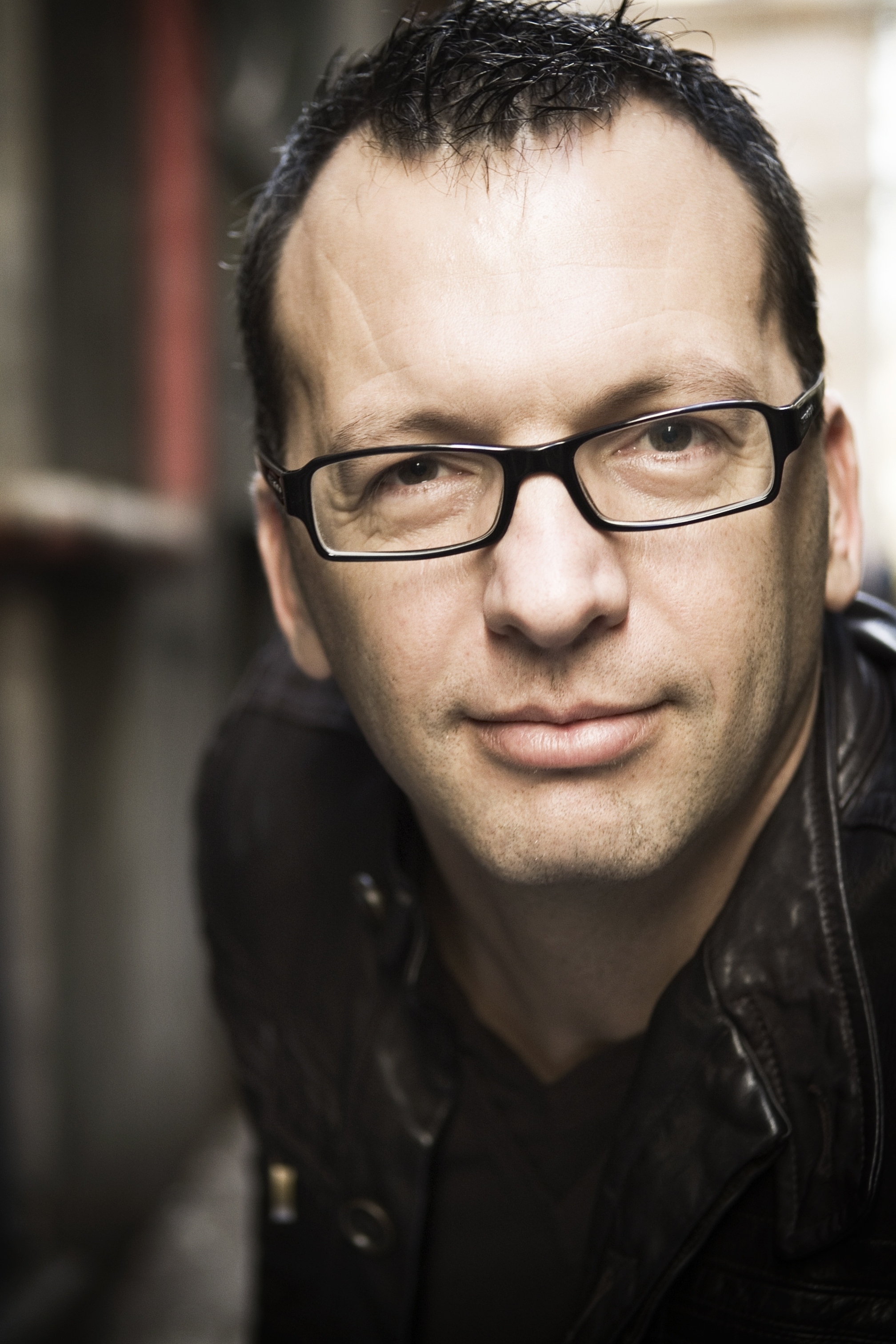
David Smiedt

== Early life and education ==
David Michael Smiedt was born in Johannesburg, South Africa, and grew up in the suburbs of Parkwood and Saxonwold. His family emigrated from South Africa to Australia in 1986.

Having completed high school in Johannesburg, Smiedt received a Bachelor of Arts (Communication) at Sydney's Macquarie University before undertaking a Diploma in Journalism at Macleay College.

== Career ==
=== Early career and journalism ===
Smiedt began his journalism career at Penthouse magazine and has since worked across a number of lifestyle titles, including Cleo, Cosmopolitan, Madison, Men’s Health, GQ, Sunday Life, Elle, Home Beautiful, Voyeur and The Rake.

=== Comedy ===
Smiedt started his stand-up comedy career at the Local in St Kilda in 2006, and went on to perform at the Comedy Store in Sydney, the Harold Park Hotel, the Roxbury, the Friend in Hand, the Melbourne International Comedy Festival and the Comic Strip in New York City.

== Selected publications ==
- Boom Boom: 100 Years of Australian Comedy (Hodder Headline, 1999)
- Delivering The Male (Penguin, 2000)
- Girls' Night In: Gentlemen By Invitation (anthology) (Penguin, 2001)
- Girls' Night in 2: Big Night Out (anthology) (Penguin, 2002)
- Prince Charming: Spot The Stayers From The Players (Landsdowne Press, 2003)
- Are We There Yet? Chasing A Childhood Through South Africa (UQP/Penguin, 2004 and Random House UK 2006)
- From Russia With Lunch: A Lithuanian Odyssey (UQP, 2008)
