= Jeni Mawter =

Australian children's author

- Born: 1959 (age 66–67); Sydney, New South Wales, Australia
- Education: Bachelor of Applied Science (Speech Pathology); Diploma of Book Editing; Master of Arts (Children's Literature)
- Occupations: Children's author; Writer; Editor; Educator
- Known for: So series; children's and young adult literature
- Notable work: So Gross!; So Festy!; So Feral!; Unleashed!; Freewheelers series
- Spouse: David Mawter
- Children: 3
- Website: www.jenimawter.com

Jeni (J.A.) Mawter (born 1959) is an Australian children's author who has published over twenty books, including the best-selling series, the So series. She has published fiction and non-fiction, poetry and verse narrative for children and young adults. Her books have ranged from picture books, to chapter books, short story collections to young adult novels.

== Biography ==
Mawter was born in Sydney to parents, Nola and Garry Braude. She has a sister, Debbi and a brother, Michael. Mawter attended Willoughby Infants', Willoughby Primary and Willoughby Girls' High School where she was School Captain in 1977. She completed a Bachelor of Applied Science in Speech Pathology at Cumberland College (now Sydney University), graduating in 1980 and winning the Private Speech Pathology Association Prize. Mawter worked as a speech pathologist for many years at the Royal Prince Alfred, Royal North Shore and Eversleigh Hospitals, working with neurology, neurosurgery, and head and neck patients. For two years she ran the Speech Pathology Student Unit at Royal North Shore Hospital (1987–88) then worked for several years as a Case Manager for the Commonwealth Rehabilitation Service (1993-1996).

Mawter completed a Diploma of Book Editing from Macleay College (1997) and a Master of Arts in Children's Literature from Macquarie University (1998). Since then, she has taught creative writing at Macquarie University, the NSW Writer's Centre and is a frequent speaker at schools and literary festivals throughout Australia. Mawter has run creative writing workshops for students from 5 years to 91 years.

Mawter is married to David Mawter and they have three children: Hugh, Shevaughn and Tullia.

== Published works ==
=== Freewheelers series ===
- Extreme! (2008)
- Launched! (2007)
- Unleashed! (2006)

=== Critical Thinking, Humour and Text ===
- Critical Thinking: Humour and Text Ages 5 - 8 (2007)
- Critical Thinking: Humour and Text Ages 8 – 10 (2007)
- Critical Thinking: Humour and Text Ages 10+ (2007)

=== Junior fiction ===
- Team Dream (2005)
- Turkey Pox (2005)
- There's a Sun Fairy in Our Garden (2001)
- Go, the Mobile! (2001)
- The Most Unusual Pet (2001)
- Maisie's Race (2000)

== Other published works ==
=== Audio ===
- So Sick! (2006)
- So Feral! (2005)
- So Festy! (2005)
- So Gross! (2004)

=== Classroom focus ===
- Human Body (2008)
- The Changing face of Xmas in Australia (2004)
- The Snowy Mountains Scheme (2003)
- Food (2002)
- Feelings (2002)
- Homes and Families (2002)
- Special Days (2001)
- Natural Disasters (2001)

=== Anthologies ===
- "Excuse Me" in Short, Black Dog Books (2008)
- "Getting into the nitty gritty" in Writing {better} stories, Primary English Teaching Association (2006)
- "Pear Legs, Hello" in Alive and Winking, John Wiley & Sons Publishers (2006)
- "Slow Swimming" and The Kiss published in Alive and Kicking, John Wiley & Sons Publishers (2005)

=== Multimedia ===
- Along with Sue Murray, co-wrote the scripts for the interactive display The Magic Garden: MBF Foundation Healthy Kids Unit for The Powerhouse Museum, Sydney. (2008)

=== Articles ===
- Humour, Literacy and Literature, Teacher & Librarian, ASLA NSW (March 2006)
- Thinking Skills, Humorous Texts and Literacy, ACCESS, ASLA National (2006)
- Mentorship Newswrite, NSW Writer's Centre (2005)
- Writing Humour: Why Gross Works for Kids, Paper given at the Sydney Writers' Festival (2005)
- Tell Me a Story, Classroom Magazine, Scholastic Australia, Issue 5 (2000)
- The Brain-Injured Child in the Classroom, Classroom Magazine, Scholastic Australia, Issue 6 (1999)

== Awards ==
Unleashed! shortlisted for the West Australian Young Readers' Book Awards in 2009
