= MacLennan-Hookham suspension =

Dr Gary MacLennan and Dr John Hookham are senior lecturers at Queensland University of Technology (QUT) who were suspended for six months in 2007 after publicly criticising a PhD thesis-in-progress by film-maker and sessional lecturer Michael Noonan entitled Laughing at the Disabled.

In April 2007 MacLennan and Hookham published an attack on the thesis in the Higher Education section of the national daily newspaper The Australian. In their article ("Philistines of relativism at the gates") they said they could "no longer put up with the misanthropic and amoral trash produced under the rubric of postmodernist, post-structuralist thought", and the "last straw" was the Noonan thesis presentation. MacLennan and Hookham took offence at a film exhibited as part of the thesis, showing two intellectually disabled young men performing interviewing tasks where they became figures of fun, both for those they were interviewing and for the audience of academics and students at the screening. MacLennan and Hookham wrote: "For us, it was a moment of great shame and a burning testimony to the power of post-structuralist thought to corrupt." MacLennan angrily confronted Noonan after the screening, saying "I have a handicapped child and I pray to God that my child never comes into contact with someone like you."

QUT suspended the lecturers for six months without pay on misconduct charges following complaints from a student and an academic, a decision which has provoked debate on various blog sites. QUT defended its decision, asserting that MacLennan and Hookham had breached the university's code of conduct. Subsequently, interviews with critics and participants filmed by postgraduate student Adrian Strong were posted on YouTube.

MacLennan and Hookham have initiated legal action against QUT, with a trial scheduled for October 2007. In the interim they have had their pay reinstated. The pair have also taken their case to the Human Rights and Equal Opportunity Commission, which has accepted a complaint of "discrimination on the basis of political opinion". The legal affairs writer of the Australian newspaper, Bernard Lane, has suggested that the issue could turn into a "postmodern test case".

Professor Stuart Cunningham, Director of the ARC Centre for Excellence in Creative Industries, wrote a piece in defense of QUT and Noonan in the Courier Mail called "Taking Arts into the Digital Era".

Michael Noonan posted an extended response in The Australian on 5 September 2007, entitled "I am the one who has been humiliated". The article counters many of the claims made by Hookham and Maclennan.

Noonan wrote,

Hookham and MacLennan have claimed that their concerns about my work were ignored by me and the internal channels within the university. This is untrue. Their outburst at my confirmation was unsettling and abusive, but I sought to address their concerns...On the night following my confirmation seminar, I emailed Hookham and MacLennan to discuss their concerns: "I'd really appreciate talking more to you both about your thoughts about my PhD project". I was met with condescension and rejection. MacLennan's email finished with the line: "When you start trying to offend the rich and the powerful I might be interested in a conversation"...Hookham and MacLennan's behaviour since my confirmation has not been a spontaneous overreaction; it has been a deliberate and premeditated assault on my PhD candidacy and my career. Based on their false description of my footage, Hookham and MacLennan emailed undergraduate students, inciting them to rally against me, to condemn my work and all those associated with me. These attacks have continued to this day.
