= David Kaplan =

David Kaplan or Dave Kaplan may refer to:

== Academics ==
- David B. Kaplan (born 1958), theoretical particle physicist, professor at the University of Washington
- David E. Kaplan (physicist), theoretical particle physicist, professor at the Johns Hopkins University
- David L. Kaplan (composer) (1923–2015), Canadian music professor and conductor
- David L. Kaplan (engineer) (born 1953), American biomedical engineer, professor at Tufts University
- David Kaplan (philosopher) (born 1933), American philosopher and professor at the University of California, Los Angeles
- Dovid Kaplan, senior lecturer at Ohr Somayach, Jerusalem, author and speaker

== Writers ==
- David A. Kaplan (born 1956), American writer and journalist
- David E. Kaplan (journalist) (born 1955), American investigative journalist and author

== Others ==
- David Kaplan (filmmaker), American film director
- Dave Kaplan (fighter) (born 1979), American mixed martial artist
- Dave Kaplan (music executive), American music executive
- David Kaplan (pianist) (born 1983), American classical pianist and chamber musician
- David Kaplan (producer) (c. 1947–1992), ABC television news producer killed in Yugoslavia
- David Kaplan (radio) (born 1960), American radio host

== See also ==
- David Caplan (1964–2019), Canadian politician
