= University of Wollongong Faculty of Business =

Faculty of Business
- Type: Faculty
- Affiliations: University of Wollongong
- Dean: Professor Charles Areni
- Location: Wollongong, Sydney, New South Wales, Australia
- Website: business.uow.edu.au

The Faculty of Business is a constituent body of the University of Wollongong, Australia. The Faculty offers undergraduate, postgraduate coursework degrees and postgraduate research degrees. The Faculty also offers graduate programs through the University of Wollongong Sydney Business School which is ranked 22nd in the Asia-Pacific region by QS World University Rankings in the 2014/2015.

== Organisation ==
The Faculty comprises three schools and two entities:

- Sydney Business School
- The School of Accounting, Economics and Finance
- The School of Management, Operations and Marketing
- Australian Health Services Research Institute
- SMART Infrastructure Facility

The Faculty also comprises three areas of research:

- Centre for Contemporary Australasian Business and Economics Studies
- Centre for Human & Social Capital Research
- Centre for Responsible Organisations & Practices

== Affiliations ==
The Faculty of Business is affiliated with a range of professional associations representing management education institutions, these include:

- The Association to Advance Collegiate Schools of Business (AACSB)
- The European Foundation for Management Development (EFMD)
- Principles for Responsible Management Education (PRME)
- The Association of Asia-Pacific Business Schools (AAPBS)
