= QUT Business School =

Faculty of the Queensland University of Technology

Coordinates: 27°28′37″S 153°01′41″E

- Established: 1989
- Dean: Vacant (Exec. Dean)
- Location: Brisbane, Australia
- Website: www.qut.edu.au/business

The QUT Business School is one of six faculties at the Queensland University of Technology. It is home to the QUT Graduate School of Business, as well as four-discipline focused schools; the School of Accountancy, the School of Advertising, Marketing and Public Relations, the School of Economics and Finance, and the School of Management. In 2015, the QUT Business School had enrolled a total of 8,971 students across the faculty, including 2,962 international students.

== Location ==
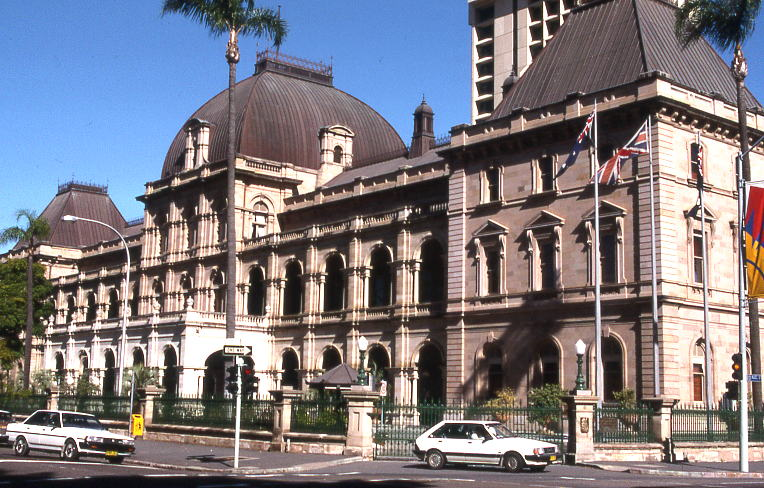
Parliament House in Brisbane, Queensland

The school is located at the Gardens Point campus in the central business district of Brisbane, in the state of Queensland, Australia. Gardens Point is situated next to Queensland Parliament and the Brisbane City Botanic Gardens. The School offers courses which are available on or off campus, or through a combination of both.

== Accreditation and Rankings ==
QUT Business School is accredited by AACSB, AMBA and EQUIS, making it one of three triple-accredited schools in Australia and one of only 100 in the world. On account of its 'Triple Crown Accreditation', QUT Business School is placed among the top 1% of Business Schools globally.

The Business School was ranked 29th in 2013 and 30th in 2014, in the entire Asia-Pacific region by the QS World University Rankings as per the report published by the QS Global 200 Business Schools 2014-15 under the Top Business Schools by Region, Asia-Pacific category.

In 2013, the QUT Business School was the first in Queensland to be included in the Financial Times Top 100 Global MBA programs and was ranked 1st in Australia and 40th worldwide in the Master of Business (Applied Finance) pre-experience programme. In 2016, the Business School was ranked again by the Business school rankings from the Financial Times as 1st in Australia and 44th globally in the same Master of Business (Applied Finance) pre-experience programme.

As of 2015, the Business School was ranked 3rd in Australia and 63rd internationally by the Financial Times in the Business school rankings from the Financial Times under the category 'Executive Education - Customised'. In 2016, it was ranked again by the Financial Times as 2nd in Australia and 71st worldwide in the Business school rankings from the Financial Times under the same 'Executive Education - Customised' category.

In 2017, the Business School was ranked 11th in the whole of Asia-Pacific and 4th in Australia by the QS World University Rankings according to the report published by the QS Global EMBA Rankings 2017 under the QS Global 100 EMBA Rankings by Region 2017, Asia-Pacific category. The QUT Graduate School of Business was ranked 1st in Australia in 2017 in the Executive MBA (EMBA) category by the BOSS Executive MBA Schools Rankings.

In 2018, QUT Business School was ranked in the top 125 universities of the world at 101-125th position and 7th in Australia in the subject areas of Business and Economics by the Times Higher Education World University Rankings by Subject 2018.

== QUT Graduate School of Business ==
Courses offered through the QUT Graduate School of Business include a Bachelor of Business, Master of Business Administration, Executive MBA (EMBA), Graduate Diploma in Business, Graduate Certificate in Business, Graduate Certificate in Business Administration, the discipline-based Master of Business, Master of Business - Executive under the 'Executive Education - Customised' category, Professional doctorates, Doctor of Philosophy (PhD) in Business, and a Public sector management and leadership course for the enhancement of management and/or leadership skills.

Its MBA program can be completed in one and a half years full-time or in three years part-time. Each unit of an MBA program is delivered in seven week modules with six weeks of teaching periods followed by a final assessment in the last week. Students get to study a broad range of core units and can concentrate on particular areas by way of choosing electives. The Graduate Certificate of Business Administration can be completed in two teaching periods full-time or four teaching periods part-time. Students who complete the GCBA can articulate into the MBA.

The Business School's professional doctorate programs consist of units from its MBA course followed by units in research methodology and several research projects. The professional doctorates differ from the traditional Doctor of Philosophy (PhD) by way of incorporating a practical approach, business focus and real-world learning into both research and coursework components.

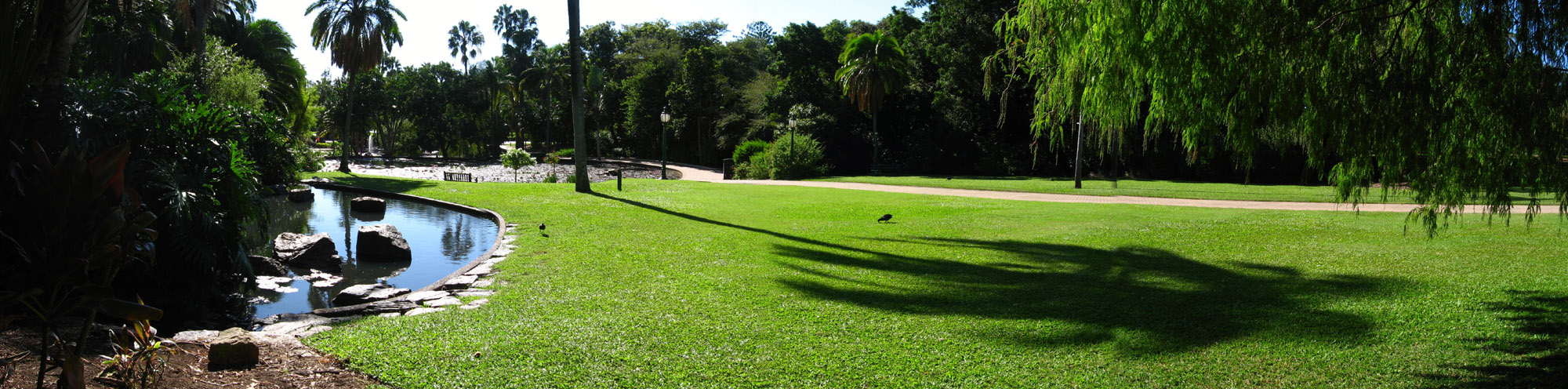
Panorama of the Brisbane City Botanic Gardens

Its Master of Business program offered in multiple disciplines is delivered on a semester basis in 13 weeks, divided into 3 study periods (13 teaching weeks per semester) and can be completed in 18 months. The Master of Business course is designed particularly for students who prefer to specialise in specific disciplinary areas such as Professional Accounting, Strategic Advertising, or Applied Finance. From 2009 onwards, a more flexible approach to learning took place by the combined offering of internal contact hours, online studies and internal intensive study for certain units.

Students may articulate from the Graduate Certificate in Business, which takes one semester full-time to complete, to the Master of Business program. Students may also articulate to the two-year Master of Business (Advanced) course, which takes one more semester full-time equivalent study to complete in addition to the Master of Business program.

== Articulation ==
Students who enter either the MBA or Master of Business programs may exit with a Graduate Certificate after approximately one semester full-time equivalent (FTE) study. Students may also articulate from the Graduate Certificate program to the Masters and then the advanced Masters or MBA (Major) with full advanced standing (credit).
