= Charles Sturt University Study Centres =

Coordinates: 33°52′42.97″S 151°12′49.70″E

- Established: 2001
- Chancellor: Lawrie Willet
- Vice-Chancellor: Professor Ian Goulter
- Location: Sydney, Melbourne and Brisbane, Australia
- Campus: Urban
- Website: http://www.csustudycentres.edu.au

Charles Sturt University (CSU) Study Centres are operated by Charles Sturt University in conjunction with Study Group Australia.

== About Charles Sturt University Study Centres ==
The first Charles Sturt University Study Centre opened in Sydney in 2001, the second in Melbourne in 2007 and the third in Brisbane in 2016. Also known as the "CSU Study Centres", they operated in conjunction with Study Group Australia. (CSU) is a public university and a member of the Association of Commonwealth Universities. The name of the university honours Charles Sturt (1795–1869), the 19th Century public servant and explorer who was among the first Europeans to travel the territory that this multi-campus institution now serves. In addition to the Study Centres in Sydney, Melbourne and Brisbane. CSU has a network of campuses in Albury-Wodonga, Bathurst, Dubbo, Orange, Port Macquarie and Wagga Wagga, with specialist campuses in Canberra, Goulburn, Manly and Parramatta.

Charles Sturt University and Study Group signed the agreement to open the Charles Sturt University Study Centres in March 2001 and work together to provide CSU undergraduate and postgraduate degree programs at these Study Centre locations. The establishment of the CSU Study Centres in the three major metropolitan cities in Australia extending the diversity of its student intake to include rural, urban and international students.

CSU Study Centre students access my.csu, a central point of information and official communication with the University, and CSU Interact, CSU's online scholarly environment for additional learning materials. Most CSU library resources, services and databases are available online, expanding access to the CSU resources. CSU Study Centre students also have access to accommodation and student services at each location.

Concerns about academic integrity at the CSU Study Centres operated by Study Group were raised by the national regulator in 2019 and led to an adjustment of the registration period of the whole University from the previous seven year cycle to a four year cycle. The regulator (TEQSA) required clearer supervision from Charles Sturt of the activities of the Study Centres.

In September 2021 it was announced that the centres would be closed at the end of 2022, and that the agreement between the University and Study Group would not be extended.

== Campus locations ==
CSU Study Centres are located in Sydney, Melbourne, and Brisbane.

== Courses ==
The following undergraduate and postgraduate courses are offered at CSU Study Centres in Sydney and Melbourne:

=== Undergraduate courses ===
- Bachelor of Business – Accounting
- Bachelor of Business – Management
- Bachelor of Business – Marketing
- Bachelor of Business Studies
- Bachelor of Information Technology
- Associate Degree in Business Studies
- Diploma of Business

=== Graduate Diploma courses ===
- Graduate Diploma of Professional Accounting
- Graduate Diploma of Business
- Graduate Diploma of Information Technology

=== Postgraduate Master's degree courses ===
- Master of Professional Accounting
- Master of Business Administration (MBA with specialisations)
- Master of Business Administration (MBA extended version)
- Master of Business (with specialisations)
- Master of Business (double specialisations)
- Master of Information Technology
