= Nathan Kaplan (disambiguation) =

Nathan Kaplan was an American gangster.

Nathan Kaplan may also refer to:

- Nathan Kaplan, birth name of Nat Ganley, American journalist and union organizer
- Nathan J. Kaplan, American jurist and politician
- Nathan O. Kaplan, American biochemist
