= Nomi Kaplan =

Canadian artist

- Born: December 7, 1933 (age 92); Memel, Lithuania
- Education: Wayne State University; University of British Columbia; Vancouver School of Art
- Occupations: Photographer, artist
- Website: www.nomikaplanart.com

Nomi Kaplan (born December 7, 1933) is a Lithuanian-Canadian photographer and artist.

She was the daughter of Bernard and Ndia Kaplan, she was born at Memel in Lithuania and then moved to Ontario with her family in 1940. Kaplan settled in Vancouver in 1955. She acquired her education from Wayne State University, at the University of British Columbia and the Vancouver School of Art. She has taken post-graduate courses in art, photography, film and video production. Kaplan taught photography at the Emily Carr Institute of Art and Design from 1991 to 1994.

In 1972, she helped organize the first Women's Film Festival in Vancouver. She was a co-founder of the ReelFeelings collective which produced the film So Where's My Prince Already?, which screened at the 1973 New York Women's Film Festival.

Her work is included in private and public collections, including the Brooklyn Museum, the Canada Council Art Bank, the Canadian Museum of Contemporary Photography, the Art Gallery of Alberta and the Winnipeg Art Gallery.
