= Tom Caplen =

English cricketer

Personal information
- Born: 23 November 1879; Rusthall, Kent
- Died: 17 April 1945 (aged 65); Hove, Sussex
- Batting: Right-handed
- Bowling: Right-arm fast
- Role: Bowler

Domestic team information
- Years: Team
- 1897: Kent
- 1898–1901: Cornwall
- Only FC: 20 May 1897 Kent v Marylebone Cricket Club (MCC)
- Source: CricketArchive, 17 March 2025

Tom Caplen (Note: Caplen's surname is sometimes spelled Caplin in mining records.) (23 November 1879 – 17 April 1945) was an English mining engineer and mine manager who worked extensively in British India and Egypt during the early 20th century. He was also a cricketer who played for Kent and Cornwall County Cricket Clubs as a right-arm fast bowler in the 1890s.

== Early life ==
Caplen was born at Rusthall near Tunbridge Wells in Kent in 1879, the son of Walter and Sarah (née Tribe) Caplen. His father was a school teacher, and Caplen was educated privately at Scotsford House school. From 1895 he played cricket for Kent's Second XI, making his debut aged 15 against Middlesex Second XI at Tonbridge. The following season, aged 16, he took 13 wickets in the same fixture, eight for 39 in Middlesex's first innings and five for 67 in their second.

After leaving school in 1896, Caplen was apprenticed with the mining engineering company, Holman Brothers at Camborne in Cornwall. He played his only first-class cricket match the following summer, appearing for Kent against Marylebone Cricket Club (MCC) at Lord's in May 1897. Playing as an amateur, and described as "a right-handed medium paced bowler of Tunbridge Wells", he took two wickets and, batting last in both of Kent's innings, made scores of five not out and one. The Daily News reported that he "did not meet with much success" but that he had "a good, easy delivery" and was "given a fair trial" bowling.

In Cornwall, Caplen, who was described some years later as "very well-known on the cricket field", played club cricket for Camborne. He was regarded as one of the best fast bowlers in the county, and made one Minor Counties Championship appearance for Cornwall in 1898, taking three wickets against Glamorgan at Swansea. (Note: Cornwall did not play in the Minor Counties Championship until 1904. In both 1897 and 1898 the county team played two matches against Glamorgan, all four of which were counted in Glamorgan's Championship points tally.) Following his three-year apprenticeship, he enrolled at the Camborne School of Mines. He played other cricket matches for Cornwall during his time in the county, and made one further appearance for Kent Second XI, taking five wickets against Sussex Second XI in an 1899 match at Tunbridge Wells. During the same summer he took ten wickets in an innings for Tunbridge Wells Cricket Club in a club match, and in 1900 was Cornwall's leading wicket-taker, with 44 wickets. His club performances in 1900 included six wickets for four runs against St Ives, including four wickets taken in successive balls, ten wickets across two innings for a total of four runs, including another hat trick, against Leedstown District, seven wickets against Falmouth, including a hat trick in the first over of the innings, and five wickets for 14 runs against Truro College.

After he graduated in 1900, Caplen left the county, The Cornishman considering that he would be "greatly missed", having done "yeoman service" for Camborne. He spent some time as an assayer in London and played some cricket for Tunbridge Wells, taking 12 wickets in a match against Hastings in 1901, before taking up a position as an assistant manager at the Vizianagram Mining Company in India.

== Professional life ==
In India Caplen was initially responsible for assaying manganese ore, working in the Vizagapatam district of the Madras Presidency. Later in 1902 he played a cricket match for the Madras Presidency team against the touring Oxford University Authentics team, (Note: The Oxford University Authentics team toured India in 1902–03. They played a series of matches across India, three of which are considered to be first-class. The match Caplen played in is not one of these.) although the demand of his job soon led to him being unable to continue to play much cricket in India.

Caplen was soon promoted to acting manager of the company, and in 1904 became its general manager, a post he held until 1915. He was elected as an Associate of the Institution of Mining and Metallurgy in 1906, managing a series of three mines. He returned to the United Kingdom in 1915, and during World War I worked at the Air Ministry as an inspector. He resigned from the ministry in 1920, and later the same year was employed as Director of Work by the British government in Egypt, involved in oil exploration in the country based at the Department of Mines at Port Tewfik. Following the Unilateral Declaration of Egyptian Independence in February 1922, Caplen left Egypt. In 1923 he toured India, working as a consultant for Holman Brothers, before spending time working in Turkey and West Africa in 1926 and 1927.

In 1927, Caplen rejoined the Vizianagram Mining Company. He worked as the company's general manager for another ten years before returning to England. He remained a director of the company.

== Personal life ==
Caplen married Irene O'Donoghue at Vizianagram in 1906, and in 1910 the couple had a son. The family lived at Coonoor. Caplen died suddenly at Hove in Sussex in 1945 aged 65.

== Bibliography ==
- Carlaw, Derek (2020). Kent County Cricketers, A to Z: Part One (1806–1914) (PDF). Cardiff: ACS.
