= Gregory Kaplan =

American historian of Spanish Studies

Gregory Kaplan is an American historian of Spanish Studies, currently a Distinguished Lindsay Young Professor at the University of Tennessee.
