= Macquarie University Faculty of Business and Economics =

Faculty of Business and Economics
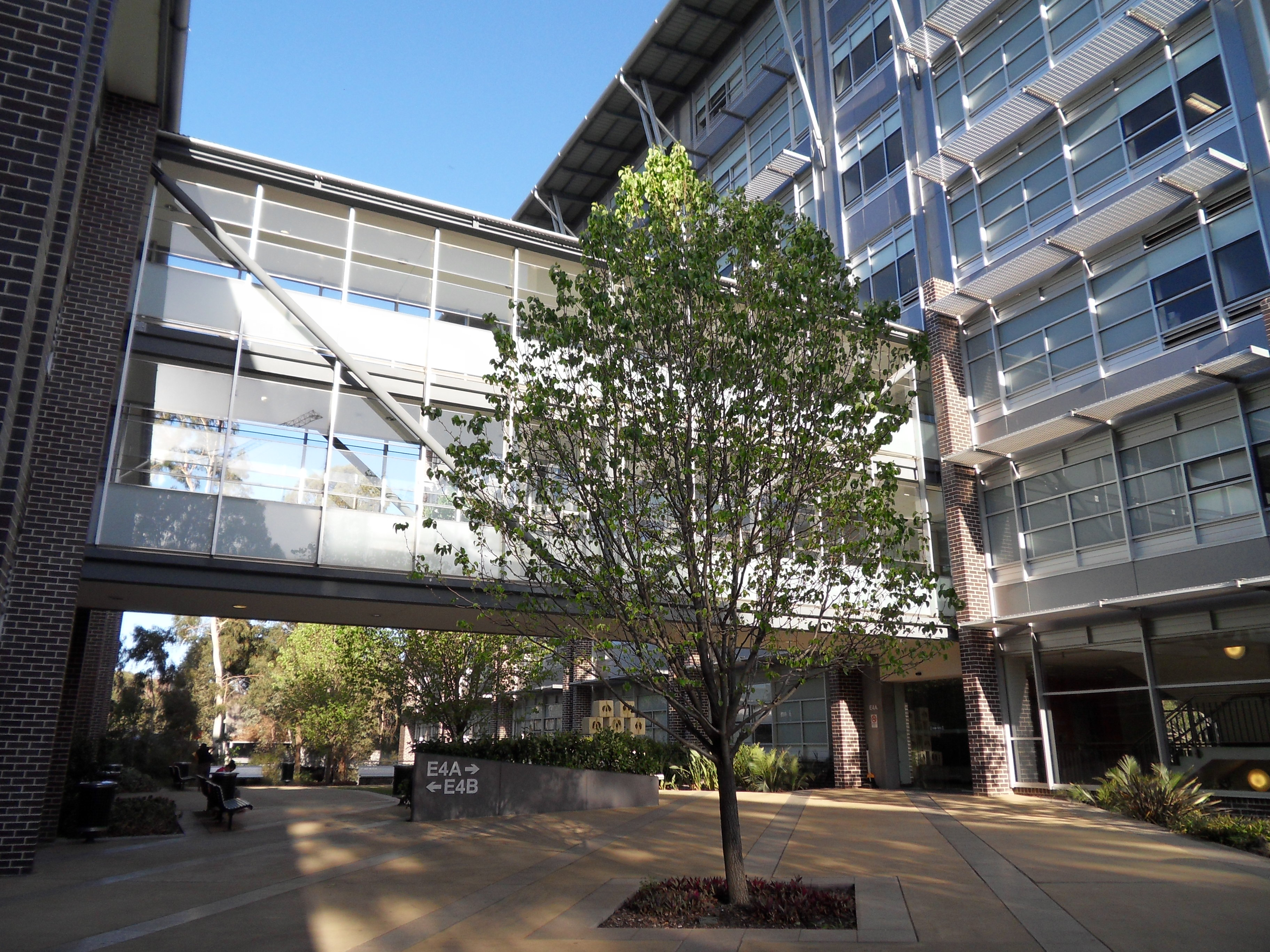
- Type: Public
- Established: 1964
- Affiliations: Macquarie University
- Dean: Professor Stephen Brammer
- Students: 15,064
- Location: Balaclava Rd, Macquarie University, Sydney NSW 2109; 33°46′18.59″S 151°6′57.1″E
- Campus: Urban
- Website: www.businessandeconomics.mq.edu.au

The Faculty of Business and Economics is a constituent body of Macquarie University. The Faculty offers both undergraduate and postgraduate coursework degrees as well as research degrees. The Faculty encompasses five departments, one school and one centre. Their flagship course, the Bachelor of Commerce, received a 5 out 5 stars rating in The Good Universities Guide when it comes to above average incomes for graduates in first-time, full employment, particularly in business. The Faculty of Business and Economics of Macquarie University is accredited by AACSB International.

== Undergraduate Study ==
Students studying within the Faculty of Business and Economics have the opportunity to participate in business internships, go on exchange and complete electives from a wide range of programs.

== Postgraduate Study ==
The Faculty offers Masters programs across a wide range of disciplines. The Faculty also offers online courses for international students or local students who have other commitments.

Areas of postgraduate study include:

- Financial Risk
- Working Futures
- Ethics
- Governance
- Applied Finance
- Business Excellence
- Asian Economies
- Economics Research

Research Groups within the Faculty of Business and Economics provide research and analysis services to a variety of corporations and government bodies.

== Faculty Departments, Centres and Schools ==
The Faculty of Business and Economics comprises one centre, four departments and one school:

- Applied Finance Centre
- Department of Accounting and Corporate Governance
- Department of Applied Finance and Actuarial Studies
- Department of Economics
- Department of Marketing and Management
- Macquarie Graduate School of Management (MGSM)
