= James Cook University School of Business =

Coordinates: 19°19′39.6″S 146°45′30.9″E

James Cook University
- Type: Public university
- Established: 2000
- Head: Professor David Low
- Location: Townsville Cairns, Qld, Australia

The James Cook University School of Business is a constituent of James Cook University which is responsible for Accounting, Economics, Business, Tourism, Marketing, Management, Development and Information Technology disciplines offered by James Cook University. The School of Business is located between the University's Cairns Campus and Douglas Campus. The head of the school is Professor David Low.

== Business ==
The James Cook University School of Business administrates a number of undergraduate and postgraduate courses in business. The school offers a number of majors to undergraduate students that focus on fields including tourism, management, economics, hospitality management and human resources management. The school also offers a wide range of postgraduate courses in similar disciplines. All School of Business undergraduate courses are CPA and ICAA accredited. The school of business resides in the Law, Business and Creative Arts building at the Townsville, Douglas campus and building A1 at the Cairns campus. The school also teaches through James Cook University's Brisbane and Singapore campuses.

== Information on the technology ==
As well as of business-related studies, the School of Business also encompasses information technology disciplines. Based in both the Townsville and Cairns campuses, the School of Business offers Australian Computer Society accredited Undergraduate and Postgraduate courses in Information Technology. The Discipline of Information Technology is also a member of the Microsoft Developer Network Academic Alliance and undergraduate students cover appropriate curriculum to complete Cisco Certified Network Associate and Microsoft Certified Professional certifications. The discipline of Information Technology is currently housed in the building 17 in Townsville, Douglas campus and building A2 at James Cook University's Cairns campus. The discipline of information technology also offers limited offerings at the Singapore and Brisbane campuses and also offers some subjects through the Beijing University of Technology.

=== History ===
The School of Information Technology (later to become the School of Maths, Physics and Information Technology) was founded in January 2000 at James Cook University to continue the disciplines in computer sciences previously taught by the University. First offered by the University in 1986 at the Townsville campus, computer science disciplines were also offered in the Cairns campus following the formation of the campus in 1996. The foundation of a formal school for these disciplines in 2000 also established a larger range of courses and subjects at both Campuses. Facilities for the school were housed in the Tropical Environmental Sciences and Geography (TESAG) building until the merger with the School Maths and Physical Sciences in 2006 when the school was entirely moved to the nearby building 17. In January 2009 the former School of Information Technology was detached from The School of Maths and Physical Sciences and merged with the School of Business as part of a large restructuring of James Cook University.

== eResearch Center ==
James Cook University's eResearch Center, forming part of the School of Business, provides specialist facilities for research into the "application of information management and communications technologies to carry out better and more efficient research and collaborative practices". The current Director of the facility is Associate Professor Ian Atkinson. The facility based in the Maths, Physics and Information Technology building at James Cook University's Townsville campus.
