= Natasha J. Caplen =

British-American geneticist

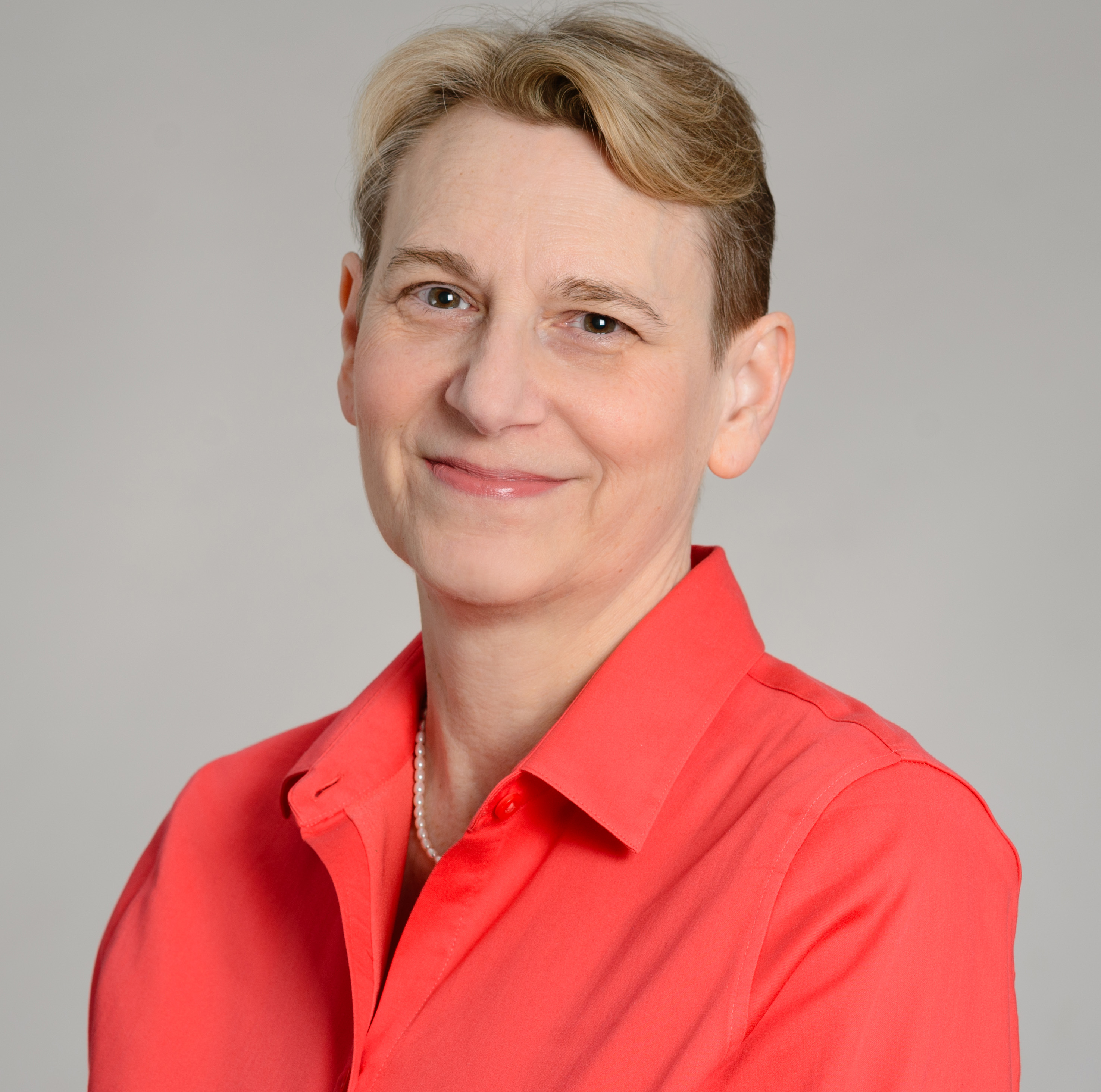
- Education: King's College Hospital Medical School (PhD)
- Scientific career
- Fields: Genetics, cancer biology
- Workplaces: National Human Genome Research Institute; National Cancer Institute
- Thesis: A Study of the Genetics of Insulin-Dependent Diabetes Mellitus and its Microvascular Complications (1991)

Natasha Jane Caplen is a British-American geneticist who discovered RNA interference (RNAi) in mammalian cells. She is a senior investigator and head of the functional genetics section at the National Cancer Institute.

== Education ==
Caplen completed a Ph.D. from the King's College Hospital Medical School where she studied the genetics of type I diabetes and its complications. Her dissertation in 1991 was titled, A Study of the Genetics of Insulin-Dependent Diabetes Mellitus and its Microvascular Complications. Caplen's postdoctoral training began at St Mary's Hospital Medical School where she focused on the development of gene therapy approaches for cystic fibrosis (CF) during which she was involved in some of the first pre-clinical and clinical studies of cationic lipid mediated gene therapy for CF.

== Career and research ==
In 1996, Caplen came to the National Human Genome Research Institute (NHGRI) at NIH as a visiting fellow, where she initially conducted studies investigating hybrid viral vector systems. It was while at NHGRI that Caplen developed a research interest in the newly identified gene silencing mechanism, RNA interference (RNAi) leading to her studies that establish the presence of RNAi in mammalian cells. Caplen joined the Center for Cancer Research (CCR) at the National Cancer Institute (NC) in 2004 as a Senior Scientist, where she pioneered approaches for exploiting RNAi to investigate cancer biology and treatment and helped establish a trans-NIH facility for genome-wide RNAi screening. Caplen was appointed a tenure-track investigator in CCR's Genetics Branch in January 2016. She is head of the functional genetics section. Her research focuses on using functional genetic methods to interrogate specific aspects of the genetic, transcriptional, and signaling alterations observed in cancers driven by fusion oncogenes.
