= Australian Institute of Management Education and Training =

Australian registered higher education provider

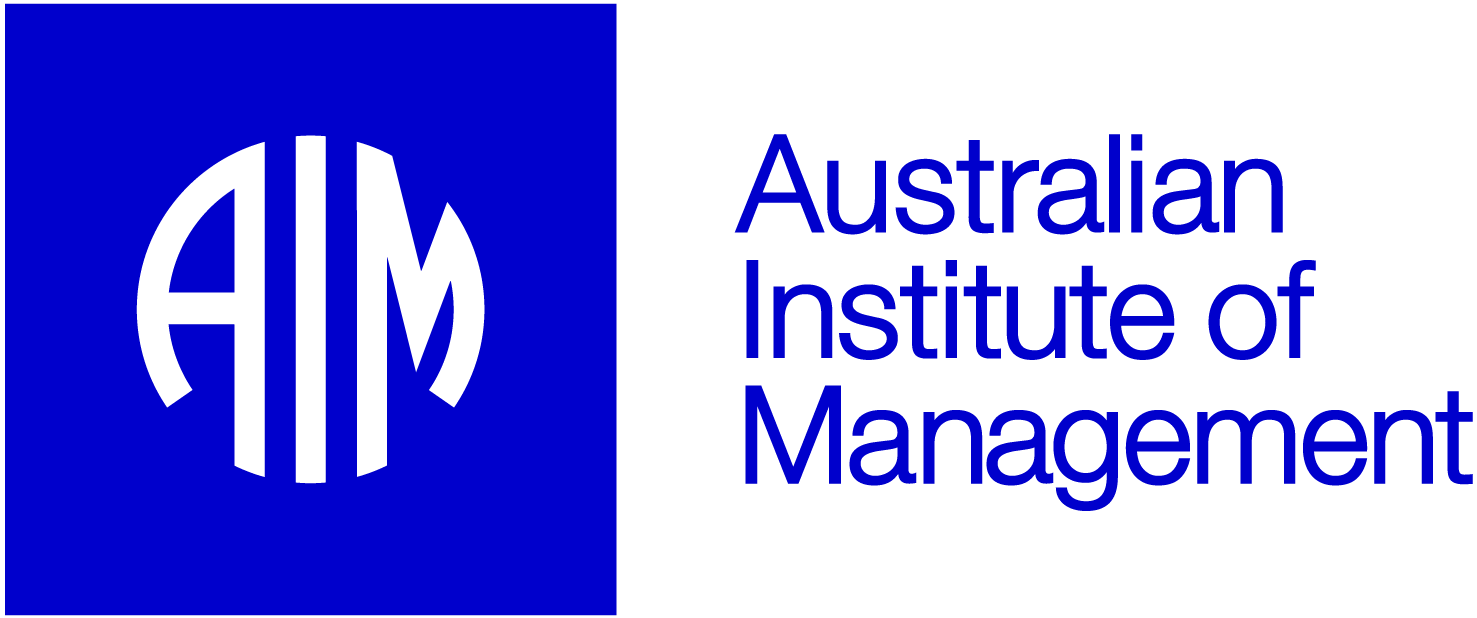
- AIM
- Motto in English: Seize the Future
- Type: Private
- Established: 1941
- Affiliations: Scentia, ACHW, Centre for Public Management, Accredited Courses Australia
- Administrative staff: 150
- Students: 20,000 / Year
- Location: NSW, QLD, ACT, SA, VIC
- Website: aim.com.au

The Australian Institute of Management Education and Training Pty Ltd, commonly known as AIM or AIMET, is an Australian education provider. Its courses include business, management and leadership. AIM offers short courses, nationally accredited qualifications, post-graduate higher education and corporate solutions. Campuses and offices are located in New South Wales, Australian Capital Territory, Queensland, South Australia and Victoria.

AIM is an approved Higher Education provider (Provider ID PRV12071), listed on the Tertiary Education Quality and Standards Agency’s (TEQSA) national register. AIMET is an approved FEE-HELP provider.

In addition, AIM is a Registered Training Organisation (RTO No.0049), listed on the National Register of VET.

In October 2015, AIMET became part of Scentia Australia Pty Ltd.

== Courses ==
AIM has over 80 short courses, including:

- Management and Leadership
- Project Management
- Human Resources
- Sales and Marketing
- Professional Development

AIM offers a range of Certificates, Diplomas and Advanced Diplomas.

AIM Business School offers accredited postgraduate programs. Management experience counts towards eligibility for these courses.

AIM Business School offers the Graduate Certificate in Management, Graduate Diploma in Management, and Master of Business Administration.

Centre of Public Management is a division of AIMET that provides training to public sector departments in Canberra.
