= Felix Kaplan =

American politician and businessman (1897–1989)

Felix C. "F.C." Kaplan (May 17, 1897 in Owatonna, Minnesota – July 5, 1989) was an American politician and businessman. He was the son of Josef Karel Kaplan, an early Minnesota pioneer.

Kaplan attended Owatonna High School, then went to the University of Minnesota and received his bachelor's degree in agricultural education and chemistry. He joined the Aitkin High School faculty and taught agriculture and general science, and was named "Teacher of the Year" in 1963.

He married Hazel Oerke in 1930. She was a graduate of St. Olaf College and was an English teacher and the principal of Hinckley, Minnesota, High School.

Kaplan was in the Minnesota House of Representatives from 1949 to 1954 and lived in Aitkin County, Minnesota.
