= David L. Kaplan (engineer) =

American biomedical engineer (born 1953)

David L. Kaplan (born 18 March 1953) is an American biomedical engineer.

Kaplan completed a bachelor's of science from SUNY Albany in 1975, and earned his doctorate at Syracuse University and SUNY Syracuse in 1978. He holds the Stern Family Professorship in Engineering at Tufts University, and is chief editor of the American Chemical Society's scientific journal Biomaterials Science and Engineering.

Kaplan was elected a fellow of the American Institute for Medical and Biological Engineering in 2003, and is a 2021 member of the United States National Academy of Engineering.
