= Queensland University of Technology =

Public research university in Brisbane, Australia

- Former names: Queensland Institute of Technology (1965–1988)
- Motto: The university for the real world
- Type: Public research university
- Established: 1849 (antecedent); 1989 (current state)
- Accreditation: TEQSA
- Budget: A$1.21 billion (2023)
- Chancellor: Ann Sherry
- Vice-Chancellor: Margaret Sheil
- Faculty: 2,140 (FTE, 2023)
- Administrative staff: 2,369 (FTE, 2023)
- Total staff: 4,509 (FTE, 2023)
- Students: 52,073 (2023)
- Undergraduates: 37,487 (2023)
- Postgraduates: 11,453 coursework 2,339 research (2023)
- Other students: 794 (2023)
- Location: Brisbane, Queensland, Australia; 27°28′37″S 153°01′41″E
- Campus: Urban and parkland with multiple sites
- Colours: Blue
- Sporting affiliations: UniSport; EAEN
- Mascot: Tank the Tiger
- Website: qut.edu.au

The Queensland University of Technology (QUT) is a public research university located in the city of Brisbane in Queensland, Australia. It has two major campuses, a city campus in Gardens Point and a campus in Kelvin Grove. The university offers courses in fields including architecture, engineering, information technology, healthcare, teaching, law, arts and design, science and mathematics.

QUT operated as the Queensland Institute of Technology (QIT) established in 1965 receiving university status by act of Parliament of Queensland in 1988. Queensland University of Technology commenced operations the following year in January 1989. The Brisbane College of Advanced Education, an amalgamation of tertiary colleges dating back to 1849, merged with QUT expanding to its Kelvin Grove site in 1990.

In 2022, QUT enrolled 50,216 students, including 37,860 undergraduate and 11,760 postgraduate students and employed 4,675 regular staff members. It also had a total income of A$1.004 billion, a total expenditure of A$1.135 billion and held A$1.849 billion in accumulated assets. It is eighth largest university in Australia by enrolment and the second-largest in Queensland.

QUT was formerly a member of the Australian Technology Network of universities, but withdrew participation on 28 September 2018. The QUT Business School is one of three Triple Crown business schools in Australia and possesses accreditation by Association to Advance Collegiate Schools of Business, Association of MBAs and EQUIS.

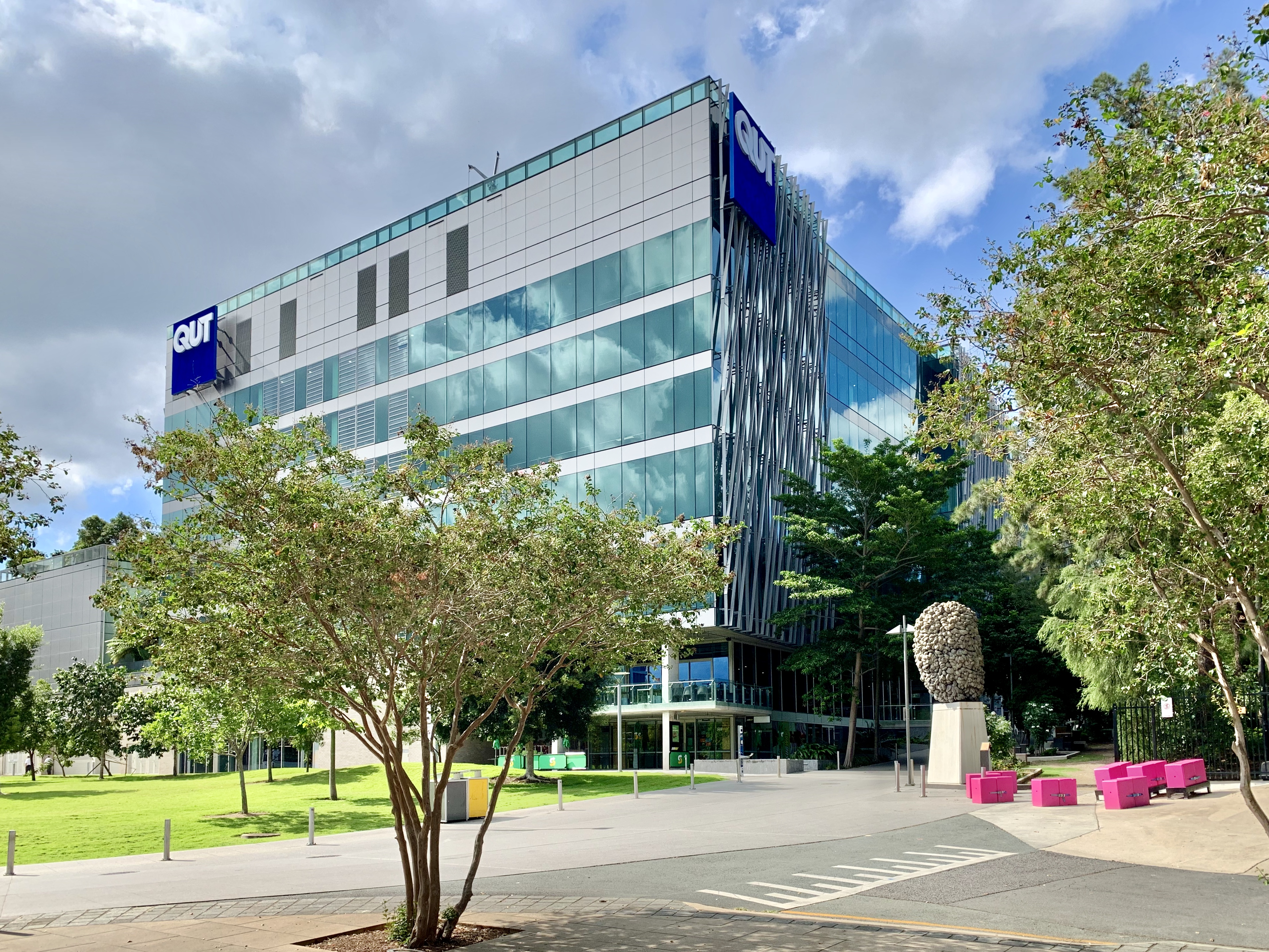
P Block, part of the Science and Engineering Precinct, at the Gardens Point campus, in the Brisbane CBD

== History ==
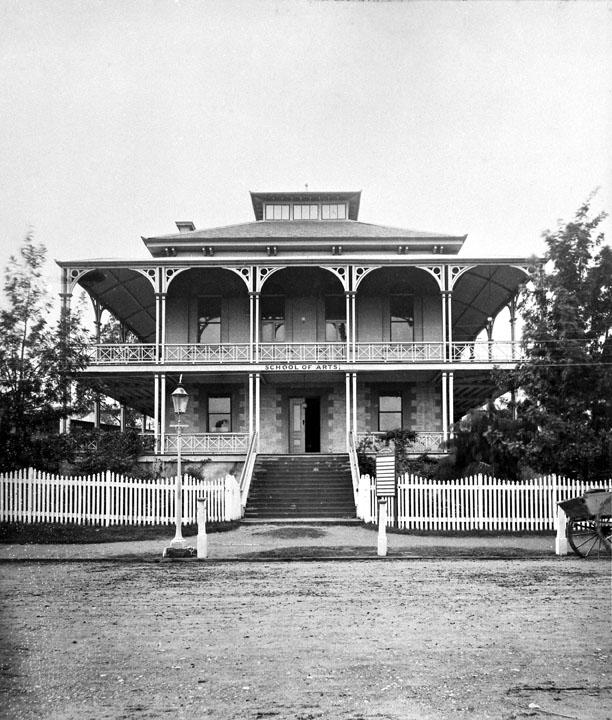
Brisbane School of Arts, opened 1849, the earliest antecedent institution

Queensland University of Technology (QUT) has a history that dates to 1849 when the Brisbane School of Arts was established. Queensland Institute of Technology (QIT) succeeded the Central Technical College and was formed in 1965. The current QUT was established as a university in 1989 after having been several predecessor institutions listed below:

- Brisbane School of Arts (1849–1881)
- Brisbane Technical College (1882–1907)
- Central Technical College (1908–1964)
- Queensland Institute of Technology (1965–1988)

Brisbane College of Advanced Education was formed in 1982, which itself is a combination of multiple predecessor institutions shown in the list below:

- Brisbane Kindergarten Training College (1911)
- Brisbane Kindergarten Teachers College (1965)
- Queensland Teachers' Training College (1914)
- Kelvin Grove Teachers College (1961)
- Kelvin Grove College of Advanced Education (1976)
- Kedron Park Teachers College (1961)
- North Brisbane College of Advanced Education (1974)

In 1988, the Queensland University of Technology Act was passed for the grant of university status to Queensland Institute of Technology (QIT). As a result, QIT was granted university status and was operational as Queensland University of Technology (QUT) beginning in January 1989. The Brisbane College of Advanced Education joined with QUT in 1990.

The Gardens Point campus was once entirely housed in the 19th-century former Government House of Queensland. In 1909, during the relocation of the governor's residence, the Old Government House and the surrounding five hectares were set aside for both a university and a technical college. The first university on the site was the University of Queensland which was moved to St Lucia in 1945, where it remains today.

== Campuses and buildings ==
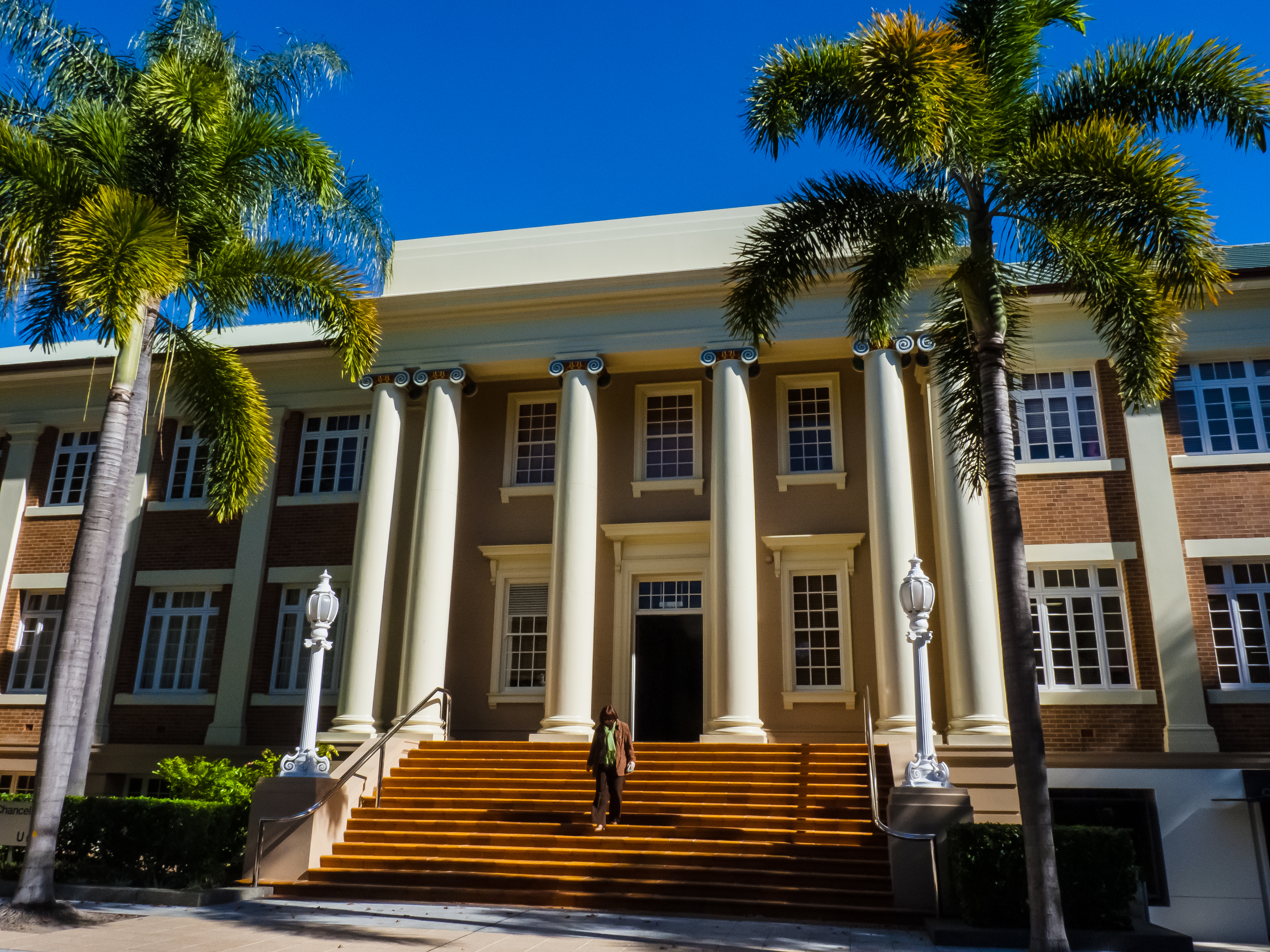
The Chancellery building on the Gardens Point campus

=== Gardens Point ===
Gardens Point campus is located in Brisbane's city centre, beside the Brisbane River and adjacent to the City Botanic Gardens and Queensland Parliament House. At the centre of the campus is the Old Government House which was built in 1862 and re-opened in 2009. The faculties of Business, Law, and Science and Engineering are based at this campus, along with facilities such as basketball courts and general parks.

==== Gardens Cultural Precinct ====
Gardens Point campus hosts the Gardens Cultural Precinct, comprising the Gardens Theatre and QUT Art Museum, which offer a full theatre and exhibition program.

- The QUT Art Museum houses the university's art collection, which focuses on contemporary Australian art, including painting, sculpture, decorative art and works on paper. The museum opened in 2000 and attracted about 350,000 people in its first decade of operations. The building is a 1930s neo-classical revivalist building designed by Peddle Thorpe Architects, Brisbane.
- The Gardens Theatre features professional theatre, children's theatre, and student showcases. The Gardens Theatre is a medium-sized venue, formerly known as the Basil Jones Theatre, and was renovated with assistance from the Queensland Government. It was reopened as the Gardens Theatre in 1999 by then-Premier Peter Beattie. It provides space for QUT productions and visiting performers, and is the only theatre complex in Brisbane's central business district.

==== Science and Engineering Precinct ====
The Science and Engineering Precinct was completed in November 2012. It brings together teaching and research in science, technology, engineering, and mathematics disciplines. The A$200 million required for the precinct came from QUT (A$65 million), the Australian Government (A$75 million), the Queensland Government (A$35 million), and Atlantic Philanthropies (A$25 million).

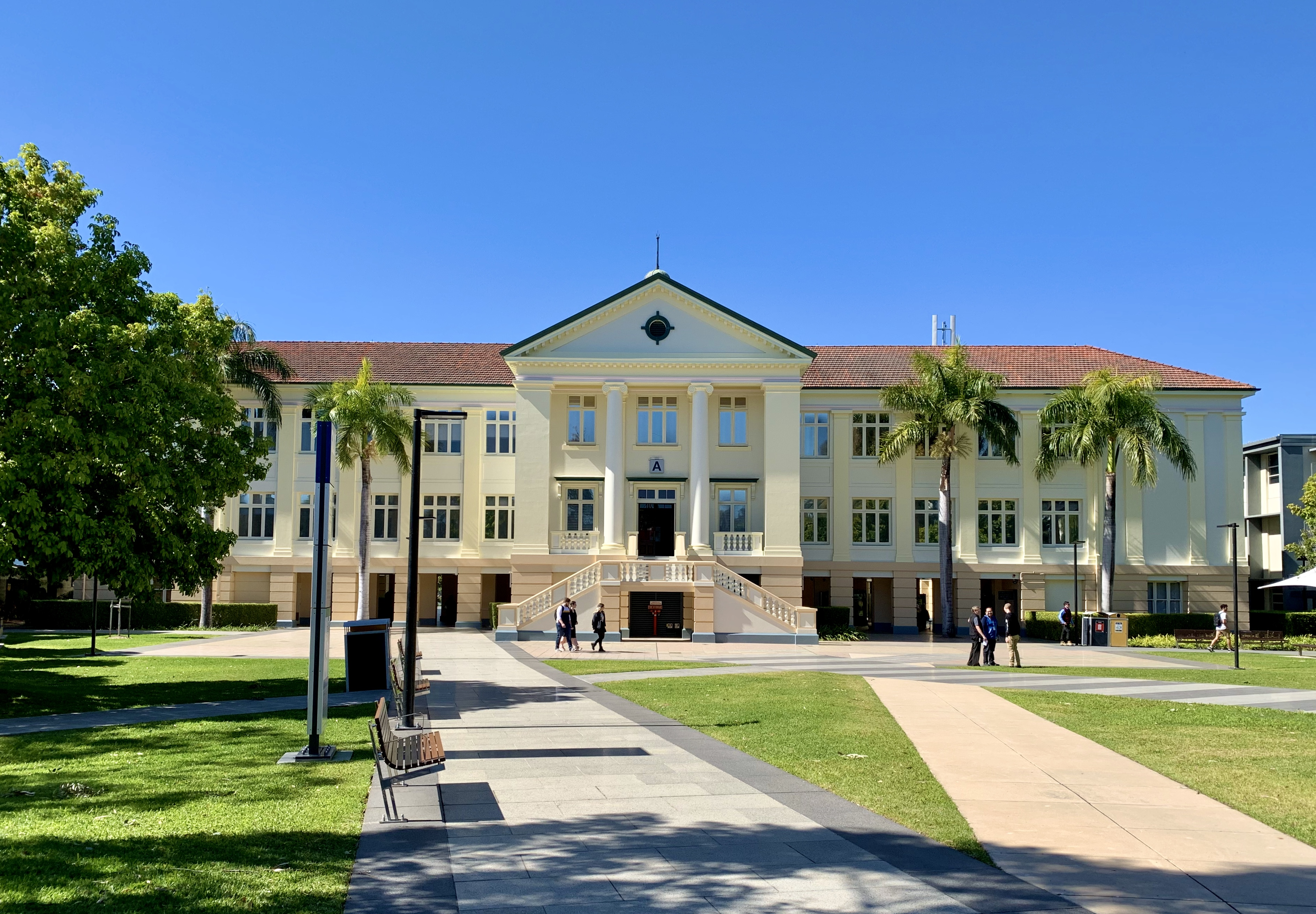
Main building on the Kelvin Grove campus, built in the early 1930s

=== Kelvin Grove ===
The Kelvin Grove campus hosts the faculties of Creative Industries, Education, and Health as well as the QUT International College and the Institute of Health and Biomedical Innovation.

QUT Kelvin Grove Health Clinics offer services for free or low-cost services to staff, students, and the general public.

QUT operates the QUT Medical Centre, which provides primary healthcare services to QUT students, staff, and the general public. The service operates across two clinics located at the Kelvin Grove and Gardens Point campuses and is staffed by a multidisciplinary team of general practitioners, registered nurses, mental health nurses, psychologists, dietitians, and administrative staff. The Medical Centre offers a range of healthcare services, including general practice, travel medicine, immunisations, mental health support, sexual health, skin cancer checks, lifestyle and wellbeing services, and minor procedures.

In 2026, QUT was selected to host the Medicare Inner Brisbane Urgent Care Clinic, located at the Kelvin Grove campus.

The Creative Industries Precinct architecturally designed in joint venture by KIRK (Richard Kirk Architect) + Hassell, located at Kelvin Grove campus, includes many arts and exhibition spaces open to the public:

- the Roundhouse Theatre, a large theatre venue and home of the La Boite Theatre Company.
- interactive exhibition spaces.
- an experimental black-box theatre.
- multimedia performance spaces.
- public artwork exhibition spaces.

The Precinct was built at a cost of around $60 million on the site of the Gona Barracks, an Australian Army barracks, which was decommissioned in 1998.

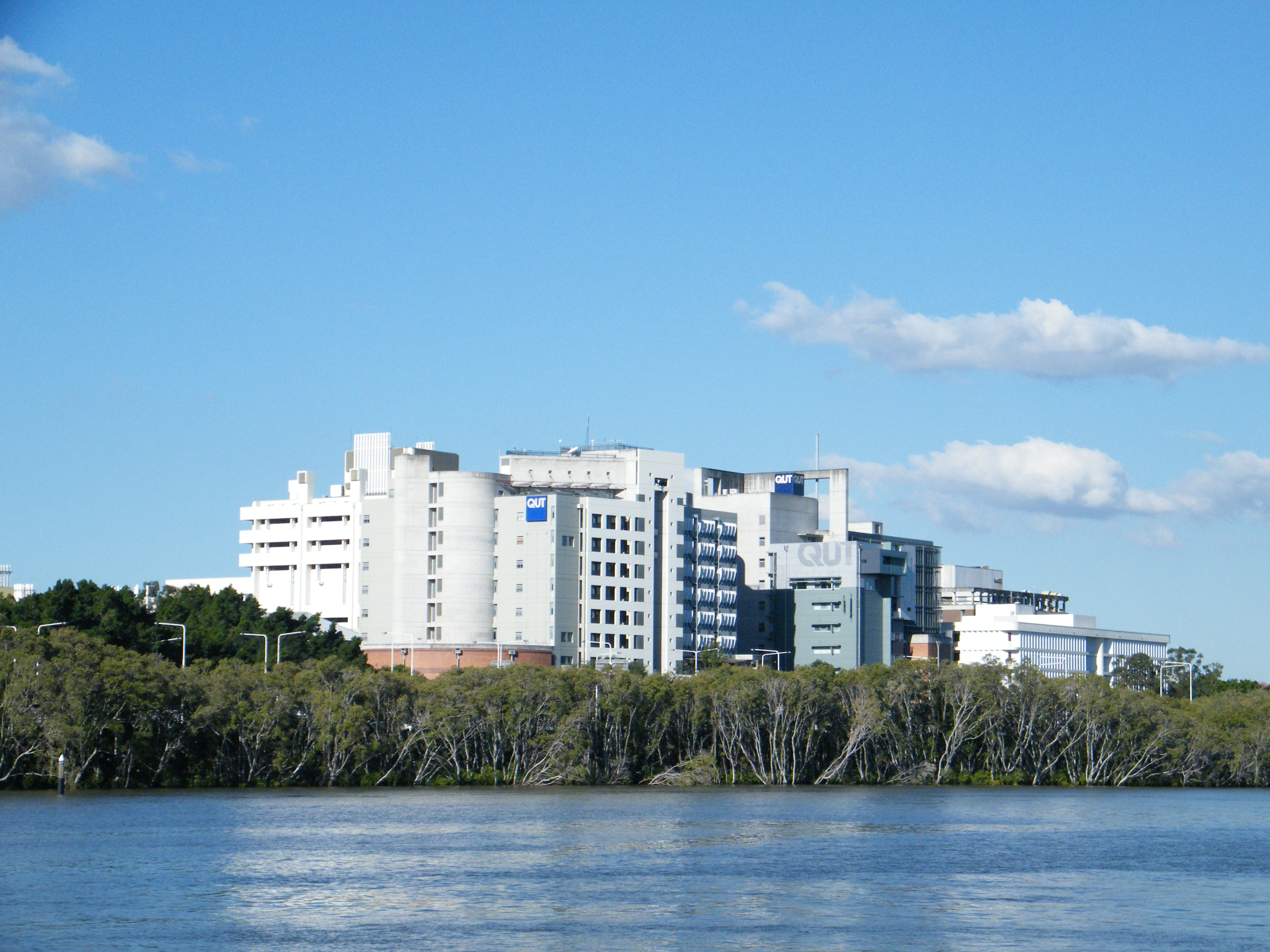
QUT Gardens Point campus as seen from South Bank Parklands.

=== Canberra Executive Education Centre ===
QUT hosts a small campus in the suburb of Deakin in Canberra, called the Canberra Executive Education Centre (CEEC). The CEEC provides in-person classes for QUT's Executive Master of Business Administration, which is jointly taught with an academic mission from the MIT Sloan School of Management. The Centre also provides professional training and development short courses through the QUTeX brand and is an in-person hub for the QUT Public Sector Management Program (QUT PSMP).

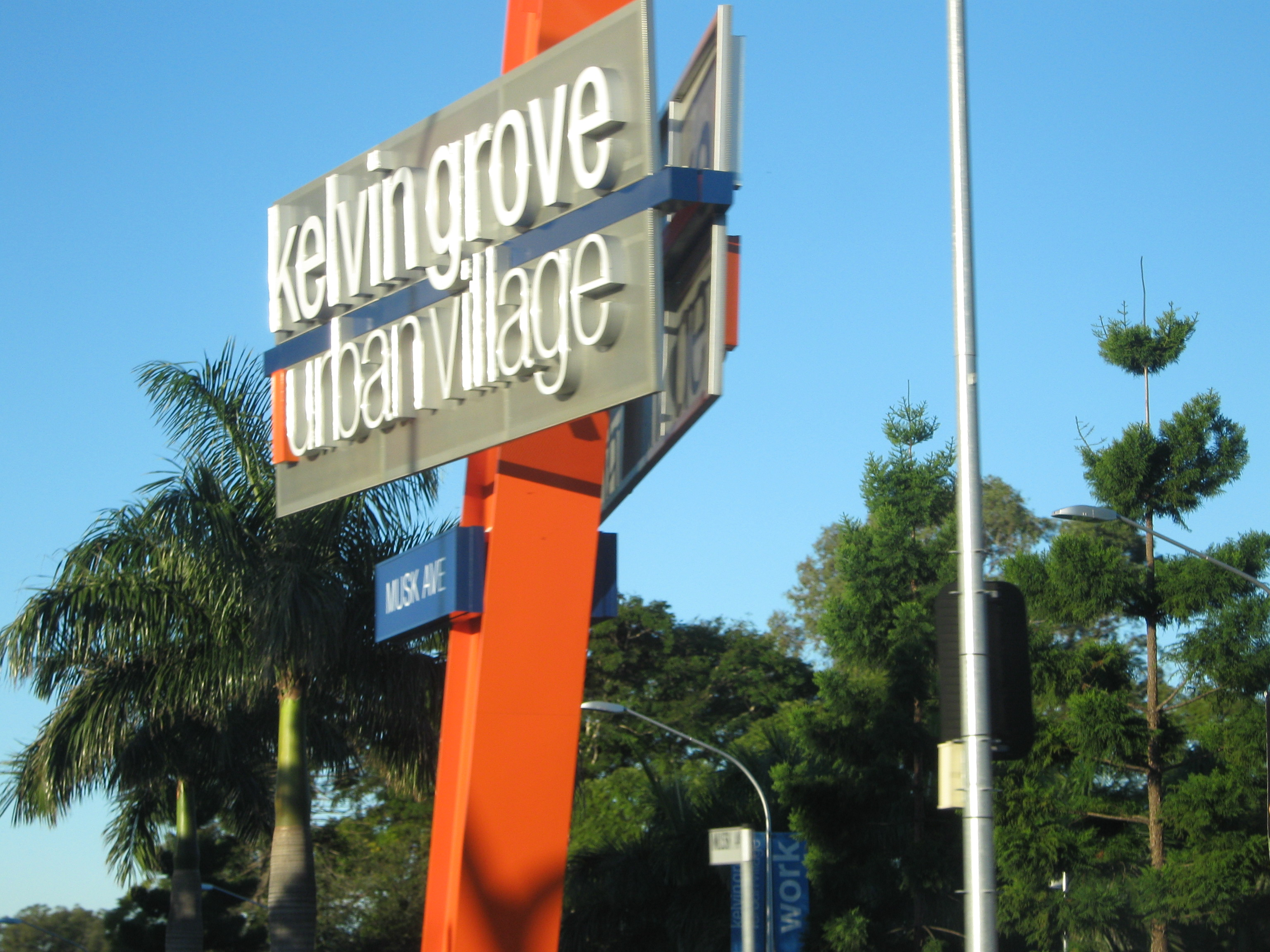
The Kelvin Grove campus is situated in the Kelvin Grove Urban Village

=== Former campuses ===
==== Caboolture ====
The Caboolture campus, located 45 kilometres (28 mi) north of Brisbane, was co-occupied by TAFE Queensland. The campus offered undergraduate degrees in business, education, and nursing, and first-year studies in creative industries before the campus was transferred to the University of the Sunshine Coast on 8 January 2018.

==== Carseldine ====
In November 2008, Carseldine teaching, research, and support activities were relocated to Kelvin Grove and Gardens Point campuses. This included the School of Psychology and Counselling and the School of public health and social work, as well as some business, science, and information technology subjects. The campus has since been closed and was subsequently renovated by the Queensland Government. Following QUT's decision to vacate the campus and the lack of a suitable education provider to take over the site, the State Government announced plans to decentralise government services and move around 1000 employees to the remodeled former QUT buildings, which occurred post-2012.

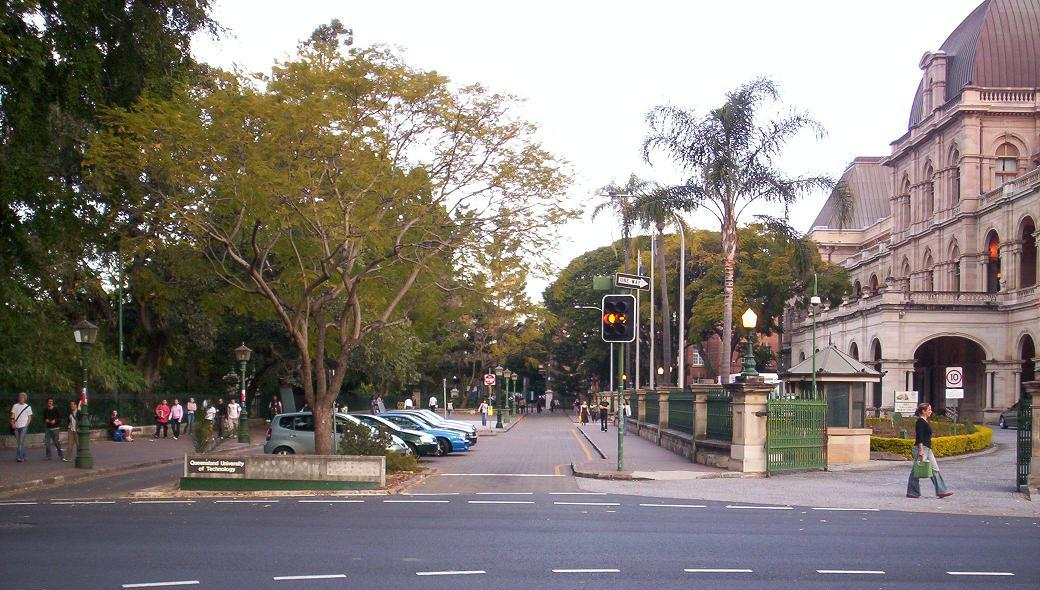
Entrance to the Gardens Point campus with Parliament House on the right

==== Kedron Park ====
Kedron Park Teachers College was established in 1961, amalgamated into the North Brisbane College of Advanced Education in 1975, Brisbane College of Advanced Education in 1982 and finally joined QUT's Faculty of Education in 1990. The Faculty of Education programmes were later relocated to the Kelvin Grove campus. The site remained in use by the Faculty of Business until 1995 when its functions were transferred to other campuses and the site put up for sale. The site was later acquired by the Queensland State Emergency Services, who redeveloped the site.

== Academic profile ==
QUT offers undergraduate and postgraduate coursework, graduate diplomas and certificates, and higher degree research courses (Masters and PhDs) including, but not limited to the fields listed below:

- Architecture
- Business
- Communication
- Creative Industries
- Design
- Education
- Health and Community
- Information Technology
- Law and Justice
- Mathematics
- Science and Engineering

The QUT Business School has triple accreditation (AMBA, EQUIS, and AACSB). It is placed within the top 1% of Business Schools worldwide.

=== Queensland Business Leaders Hall of Fame ===
In 2009, State Library of Queensland, the Queensland Library Foundation, and QUT Business School collaborated to establish the Queensland Business Leaders Hall of Fame (QBLHOF) initiative. The QBLHOF recognises outstanding contributions made by organisations, companies and individuals to develop the Queensland economy and society, both contemporary and historical. A governing committee determines a list of inductees based on a set of criteria including:

- Sustained leadership
- Major financial contribution
- Pioneering
- Outstanding contribution
- Achievement of iconic status

The inductees are announced at a gala event each year in July. Since 2014, the QBLHOF has also awarded an annual Fellowship, to recipients working on a research project that utilises the resources of the John Oxley Library to produce new interpretations of Queensland's business history.

=== Research divisions ===
QUT establishes collaborative research partnerships between academia, industry, government and community actors. The university is a key member of the Brisbane Diamantina Health Partners, Queensland's first academic health science system. QUT attracts national grants and industry funding and has a number of research centres, including:

- Research Council Centre of Excellence for the Digital Child
- Centre for Agriculture and the Bioeconomy
- Centre for Biomedical Technologies
- Centre for Data Science
- Centre for Future Enterprise
- Centre for Genomics and Personalised Health
- Centre for Healthcare Transformation
- Centre for Justice
- Centre for Materials Science
- Centre for Robotics
- Digital Media Research Centre
- Australian Cobotics Centre
- Australian Centre for Entrepreneurship Research
- Australian Centre for Health Law Research
- Australian Centre for Health Services Innovation
- Australian Centre for Philanthropy and Nonprofit Studies
- Australia-China Centre for Tissue Engineering and Regenerative Medicine
- Cancer and Palliative Care Outcomes Centre
- Centre for a Waste-Free World
- Centre for Accident Research and Road Safety
- Centre for Behavioural Economics, Society and Technology
- Centre for Clean Energy Technologies and Practices
- Centre for Decent Work and Industry
- Centre for the Digital Economy
- Centre for Future Mobility
- Centre for Immunology and Infection Control
- Centre for Inclusive Education
- Centre for the Environment
- Centre for Vision and Eye Research
- Design Lab

==== Indigenous Research Centres ====
- Carumba Institute
- National Indigenous Research and Knowledges Network

==== Former research institutes ====
- Institute of Health and Biomedical Innovation
- Institute for Future Environments

=== Research facilities ===
- Biorefining Research Facility
- Central Analytical Research Facility
- Design and Fabrication Facility
- Digital Observatory
- eResearch
- Medical Engineering Research Facility
- Samford Ecological Research Facility
- Research Engineering Facility
- Visualisation and Interactive Solutions for Engagement and Research

=== Libraries and databases ===
The QUT Library provides learning and research support to students and staff. There are three library branches at QUT: Gardens Point library, Law library, and Kelvin Grove library. In addition to borrowing and information access services, the QUT library also offers specialised support for coursework students, academic staff and researchers.

The QUT library has a resource budget of approximately $13 million to buy subscription to academic journals and other materials. QUT Library provides the 3rd largest collection of ebooks and online video of any Australian or New Zealand university library.

The QUT library hosts a number of institutional repositories. In 2003, it became the first university in the world to adopt an institution-wide Open Access policy, mandating the deposit of research papers in its institutional repository, QUT ePrints. QUT Digital Collections, managed by QUT Library, brings together digitised and born digital collections for dissemination to and reuse by the global community. When possible, items will be made open access and available via a Creative Commons license. Please see individual resources for specific copyright, license and access information. QUT Digital Collections is built on EPrints repository software.

=== Academic reputation ===
University rankings

Global – Overall
- ARWU World: 301–400 (2025)
- CWTS World: 300 (Note: The CWTS Leiden Ranking is based on P (top 10%).) (2024)
- QS World: 226 (2026)
- QS Employability: 111–120 (2022)
- THE World: 201–250 (2026)
- THE Reputation: 201–300 (2025)
- USNWR Global: =182 (25/26)

National – Overall
- ARWU National: 14–20 (2025)
- CWTS National: 15 (2024)
- ERA National: 9 (2018)
- QS National: 15 (2026)
- THE National: 11–13 (2026)
- USNWR National: 13 (25/26)
- AFR National: =26 (2025)

In the 2024 Aggregate Ranking of Top Universities, which measures aggregate performance across the QS, THE and ARWU rankings, the university attained a position of #201 (15th nationally).

National publications

In the Australian Financial Review Best Universities Ranking 2025, the university was tied #26 amongst Australian universities.

Global publications

In the 2026 Quacquarelli Symonds World University Rankings (published 2025), the university attained a position of #226 (15th nationally).

In the Times Higher Education World University Rankings 2026 (published 2025), the university attained a position of #201–250 (tied 11–13th nationally).

In the 2025 Academic Ranking of World Universities, the university attained a position of #301–400 (tied 14–20th nationally).

In the 2025–2026 U.S. News & World Report Best Global Universities, the university attained a tied position of #182 (13th nationally).

In the CWTS Leiden Ranking 2024, the university attained a position of #300 (15th nationally).

=== Student outcomes ===
The Australian Government's QILT (Note: Abbreviation for Quality Indicators for Learning and Teaching.) conducts national surveys documenting the student life cycle from enrolment through to employment. These surveys place more emphasis on criteria such as student experience, graduate outcomes and employer satisfaction than perceived reputation, research output and citation counts.

In the 2023 Employer Satisfaction Survey, graduates of the university had an overall employer satisfaction rate of 83.2%.

In the 2023 Graduate Outcomes Survey, graduates of the university had a full-time employment rate of 81.3% for undergraduates and 92.5% for postgraduates. The initial full-time salary was A$70,400 for undergraduates and A$105,000 for postgraduates.

In the 2023 Student Experience Survey, undergraduates at the university rated the quality of their entire educational experience at 74.9% meanwhile postgraduates rated their overall education experience at 77.1%.

== Controversies ==
QUT has come under renewed criticism around its workplace culture, allegations of bullying and misrepresentation of job losses in 2020–21. Many academic and professional staff have expressed living in fear of this workplace, in the most significant publicity the university has received in several years. Initial steps towards change in response to these claims have been made, although this has been met with scepticism by staff, citing issues with the concept of "leadership training" for executive managers, and the lack of urgency in implementing a safe method of complaint.

The current vice-chancellor Margaret Sheil has been criticised for excessively lavish renovations for a private bathroom with "marble finishes" in her personal office.

== See also ==
- List of universities in Australia
- MacLennan-Hookham suspension
