= Kaplan Financial Education =

Financial educational school

Kaplan Financial Education (U.S.)
- Company type: Private
- Industry: Financial Education
- Founded: 1970
- Headquarters: La Crosse, WI
- Products: Insurance Licensing, Insurance Continuing Education, Securities Licensing, CFP(R) Exam Prep, Professional Development and Certificate Programs
- Parent: Kaplan, Inc.
- Website: http://www.kaplanfinancial.com

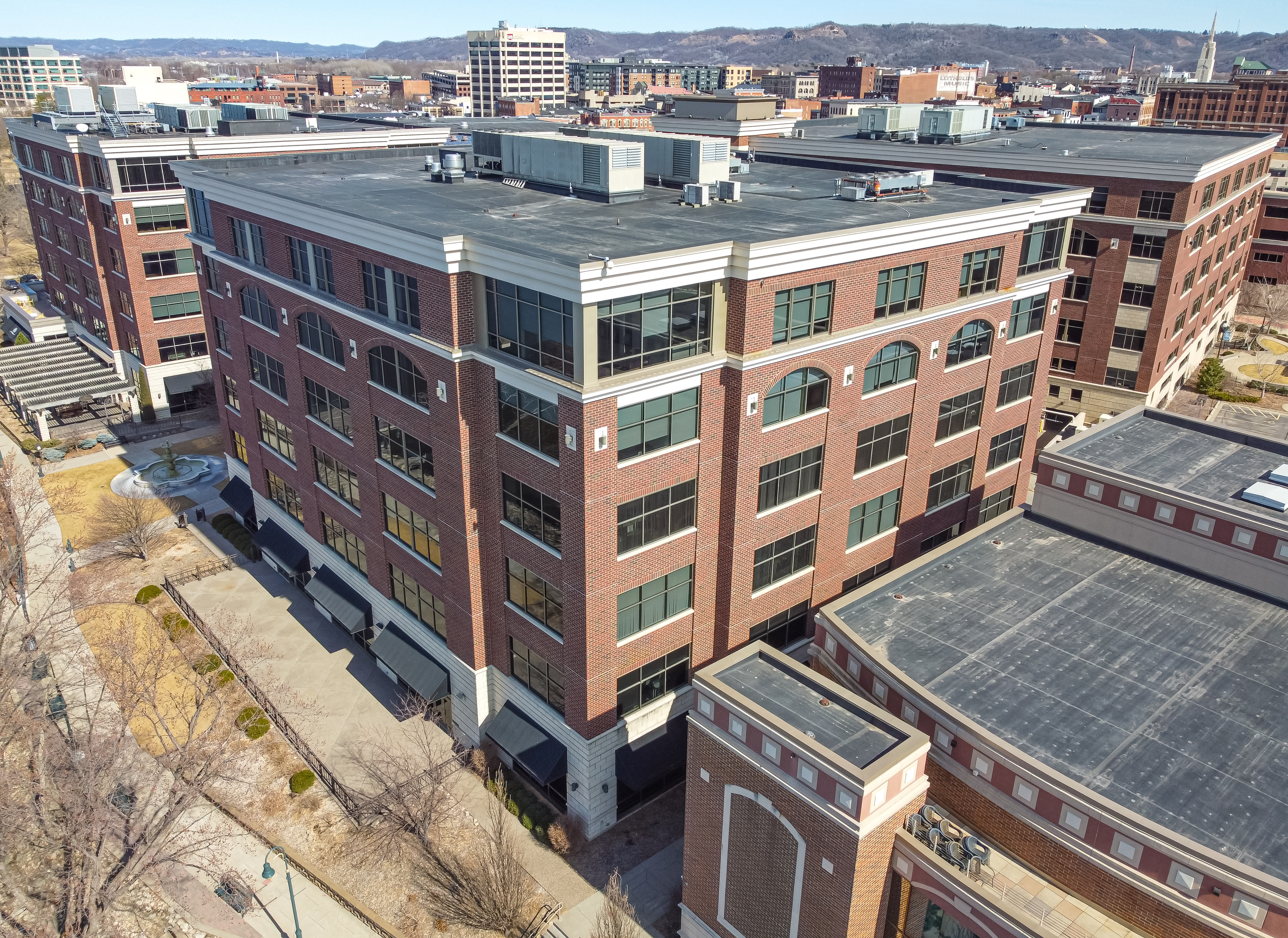
Kaplan Financial Education headquarters on the 5th floor. The buildings are owned by UnitedHealth Group and mostly occupied by OptumHealth, a subsidiary of UnitedHealth Group.

Kaplan Financial Education is part of Kaplan University School of Professional and Continuing Education, based in La Crosse, Wisconsin. Kaplan Financial Education is a consortium of numerous financial services training and publishing companies providing insurance and securities licensing exam preparation, along with continuing education. It is a subsidiary of Graham Holdings Company.

== History ==
=== Precursors ===
The origin lies in three companies founded in the early 1970s:

- Blitz Schools, a training company established in 1970 by Dennis Blitz in Dearborn, Michigan, focused primarily on the Financial Industry Regulatory Authority (FINRA) (then NASD) Series 6 classroom training for large insurance companies. Blitz secured national contracts for Series 6 training with Prudential Insurance, New York Life, and John Hancock.
- Security Schools, established by Tom Keyes, was headquartered in Minneapolis, Minnesota and had offices in Milwaukee, Chicago and Miami. Security Schools provided insurance, securities and real estate licensing classroom training.
- DSC Publishing, located in Chicago, Illinois, was a real estate licensing training company founded by Bob Kyle. Kyle published the textbooks used in his classes and sold the materials to other schools for use in their classrooms.

=== 1980s ===
In 1984, Bob Kyle pitched the idea of a national financial training and publishing business to Longman, Inc., a multibillion-dollar British publishing company owned by Pearson PLC. Pearson owned a mixture of well-known brands at that time including The Times of London, Penguin Books, Madame Tussauds Wax Museum, and Lazard Frères Investment Bank, among other companies.

Longman acquired Blitz Schools, Security Schools, and DSC Publishing and merged them together to create Longman Financial Services, Inc (LFSI). Prior to these acquisitions, Longman had only minor operations in the United States, and planned on using the firm as its U.S. entry.

In 1985, Longman purchased R&R Newkirk, an Indianapolis-based company that developed print products for insurance licensing and continuing education. The firm dated back to 1914 as Research and Review Service of America, a provider of insurance sales and product training. In 1960, the company acquired Newkirk and Associates, a planned giving publisher, and changed the name to R&R Newkirk and Company.

=== Growth ===
Over the next four years, Longman acquired more than a dozen small training organizations, merging them into LFSI. These acquisitions were made to add new geographical market and/or new product lines. Among the more notable acquisitions during this time were Fleur, Inc. and Golle & Holmes, Inc., both of which are described below:

- Fleur, a securities exam prep provider, was a large acquisition that brought classroom markets in New York, California and Colorado. The owner's son, Ed Fleur, later departed the firm and formed his own organization, PassPerfect, which is a competitor of Kaplan's today.
- The financial services business of Golle & Holmes, a Minneapolis-based custom writing group, brought a new securities licensing product line, Passtrak, into Longman and a specific product (Broker in a Box) that was a print-based self study program targeted toward large institutional firms and the NYSE 60-day training requirement.

Problems arose because of the multiple locations, multiple systems, overlapping target markets, and differing philosophies, ultimately impacting profit margins and resulting in Longman looking for a way to exit the business. In 1992, Longman acquired a publisher in Boston, Addison Wesley, and sold Longman Financial Services to Bob Kyle and Dennis Blitz, who they had retained during the initial acquisitions to manage the company. Kyle and Blitz split their new company into three distinct business units: Real Estate Schools, Real Estate Publishing, and Financial Services Training. Financial Services was consolidated from four locations into one office in Chicago, Illinois, previously acquired insurance schools in Wisconsin and Arizona were sold, and several other small schools were closed. The name of the company was changed to Dearborn Financial Publishing, which was the street address of the company's Chicago office at that time and the name of the Detroit suburb where Blitz founded Blitz Schools.

=== Further growth ===
Blitz and Kyle made changes to the firm's product lines over the next few years, discontinuing Broker-in-a-Box and revamping Passtrak, which eventually came to represent the firm's streamlined, exam-focused product for the industry. In 1996, they started looking at compliance tracking and created DCT (an acronym for Dearborn Compliance Tracking, an internet-based system that tracked compliance hours and course approvals, as well as individual student and company programs. All financial services continued to operate under one name, Dearborn Financial Publishing, while each real estate school operated under its pre-acquisition name, each dominant within a single state.

=== Kaplan ===
In 1998, Dearborn was acquired by Kaplan, Inc. Over the next few years, Kaplan made a series of strategic acquisitions.

- In early 2000, Kaplan acquired Schweser, a highly profitable organization in La Crosse, Wisconsin focused on training for the Chartered Financial Analyst designation, from Dr. Carl Schweser and Dr. Andy Temte. Schweser was the global leader in CFA exam preparation.
- The firm also acquired Prosource, a Minneapolis-based classroom business that was the dominant provider in real estate and insurance licensing in Minnesota as well as a large provider in insurance CE and securities exam prep.
- Insurance Systems of Tennessee, headquartered in Nashville, was acquired in 2004 to make Dearborn the dominant provider of insurance and securities classroom business in the state of Tennessee.
- Three schools were acquired in Texas, including Leonard-Hawes, which made Dearborn the largest insurance and real estate trainer in the state.
- Insurance Achievement, located in Baton Rouge, Louisiana, was also purchased in 2004 to make Dearborn the largest provider of insurance professional designations exam prep products in the country. IA was founded in 1964 by Bob Rackley and provided exam prep for nearly a dozen popular insurance designations, including Chartered Life Underwriter (CLU), Chartered Financial Consultant (ChFC), and Certified Property-Casualty Underwriter (CPCU).
- Saenger and Associates was purchased from its founder, Bruce Saenger, in 2004 to strengthen Dearborn's securities and insurance classroom market share in New York and surrounding states.

In April 2005, Kaplan purchased BISYS Education Services, Dearborn's largest head-to-head competitor for financial services training and a large provider of licensing and compliance services to the insurance and securities industry. The education products and services were merged with Dearborn to become Kaplan Financial, while the compliance group became a separate operating entity, Kaplan Compliance Solutions.

In 2006, Kaplan purchased eMind, headquartered in Los Angeles, California, who provided online securities firm element training and tracking, online insurance CE, and a suite of online compliance tools.

=== Later developments ===
In early 2008, Kaplan Financial was relocated from Chicago to La Crosse, Wisconsin, the home office of Kaplan Schweser. The company was placed into the hands of Kaplan Schweser's management team, and the name was changed to Kaplan Financial Education. Kaplan Real Estate Education was also relocated to La Crosse in 2008 and these three business units were collectively managed under the name Kaplan Professional Education in 2009.

In the spring of 2010, the Kaplan Compliance Solutions unit was folded back into the business, and Kaplan Professional Education became Kaplan Professional. In January 2011, the Kaplan Professional business was placed within the Kaplan University family and is now known as the Kaplan University School of Professional and Continuing Education, although Kaplan Financial Education continues to operate as its own brand within this business. Kaplan Compliance Solutions was sold in October 2011 to Vertafore, a provider of insurance software to agents, managing general agents, and carriers.
