= Macleay College =

Australian accredited higher education provider

- Location: Sydney, NSW, Australia; 33.8839°S 151.2101°E
- Campus: urban
- Language: English
- Website: www.macleay.edu.au

Macleay College is an Australian accredited higher education provider located in Sydney and Melbourne. Established in 1988, the college offers two-year bachelor's degrees in advertising and media, digital media, journalism and business; and one-year diploma courses in journalism, advertising and media, digital media, marketing and business management

== History ==
Macleay College was established in 1988.

In 2015, Macleay opened a Melbourne campus located at Swanston Street in the Melbourne CBD.

Since its founding Macleay College has been a family-owned business, transferring ownership to Sarah Stavrow in 2021.

== Locations ==
As of March 2025 the Sydney campus is located at 28 Foveaux St, Surry Hills, and the Melbourne campus at 250 Collins Street.

== Academics and accreditation ==
Teaching staff include Tracey Holmes.

Macleay College is a registered Higher Education Provider under Commonwealth legislation, regulated by the Tertiary Education Quality and Standards Agency (TEQSA) and listed on the National Register of Higher Education Providers.

Approved for FEE-HELP and a member of the Australian Council for Private Education and Training (ACPET) which includes the Australian Student Tuition Assurance Scheme (ASTAS), the largest Australian private sector scheme ensuring full protection for Macleay College students.

Approved education provider for international students (CRICOS provider 00899G).

Registered training organisation (RTO No 7096) under Commonwealth legislation, regulated by the Australian Skills Quality Authority (ASQA) and its qualifications listed on Training.gov.au, the official National Register of information on Training Packages, Qualifications, Courses, Units of Competency and Registered Training Organisations.

== Website ==
The college publishes a website covering a range of topics called Hatch.

== Notable alumni ==
- Yalda Hakim, broadcast journalist
- Raffaele Marcellino, music composer
- Jeni Mawter, children's author
- Andrew Orsatti, sports journalist
- Catriona Rowntree, television presenter
- Tara Rushton, sports presenter and journalist
- David Smiedt, journalist, author and comedian
