= Sybil Kaplan =

American journalist and cookbook author (1938–2023)

- Born: Sybil Ruth Kaufman; 1938; Kansas City, Missouri, U.S.
- Died: September 2023 (aged 84–85); Israel
- Occupations: journalist; author
- Spouses: Michel Zimmerman (divorced); Barry Kaplan (m. 1991)
- Children: 2
- Writing career
- Genres: food; children's literature

Sybil Kaplan (née , Kaufman; after first marriage, Zimmerman; after second marriage, Kaplan; 1938–2023) was an American journalist and author. She wrote ten kosher cookbooks, and five children's books.

== Early life ==
Sybil Ruth Kaufman was born in Kansas City, Missouri, in 1938. She grew up in Overland Park, Kansas. In 1957, at the age of nineteen, Kaplan made her first trip to Israel.

== Career ==
In the 1960s, Kaplan was employed by Doubleday Publishing in Manhattan.

Ten years later, she moved to Israel.

She was a book reviewer for The Jerusalem Post, before becoming a columnist. Her column, "From My Jerusalem Kitchen", ran from 1976 until she returned to the U.S. in 1980, living in Chicago where her two daughters attended school. The articles were based on her shopping trips to the Mahane Yehuda Market and the subsequent recipes that she created.

Subsequently, she returned to Overland Park, and then in 2008, she moved back to Israel. From 2009 to 2020, she conducted English language walking tours in Machane Yehuda.

Kaplan served as a synagogue librarian, board member of Hadassah, public relations director for the Encyclopedia Judaica. food columnist for the National Jewish Post and Opinion, and foreign correspondent for the Kansas City Jewish Chronicle.

She owned more than 300 cookbooks, of which at least 150 were on kosher cooking. Some of these came from Curaçao, Hungary, Italy, Poland, and Spain.

== Personal life ==
Her first husband was Michel Zimmerman; they divorced. In 1991, she married Barry Kaplan,.

Sybil Kaplan spent her later life in Jerusalem. She died in September 2023, age 84.

== Selected works ==
=== Cookbooks ===
- The Wonders of a Wonder Pot: Cooking in Israel without an Oven, 1973 ASIN B000RJ46QS
- Israeli Cooking on a Budget, 1978 ASIN B000RY1U6W
- From My Jerusalem Kitchen, 1980
- Kosher Kettle: International Adventures in Kosher Cooking, 1997 ASIN B007NBNDK8
- What’s Cooking at Hadassah College, 2006
- What’s Cooking at Moreshet Avraham, 2009
- The Shuk Lady Cooks (unpublished)

=== Autobiography ===
- Witness to History – Ten Years as a Woman Foreign Correspondent

=== Articles ===
- "Frying high: Keeping known, lesser-known culinary traditions", (Jewish Telegraphic Agency, December 12, 2011)
- "Soups are super for the sukkah" (Jewish Telegraphic Agency, October 11, 2011)
- "Going around the world to break the fast" (Jewish Telegraphic Agency, September 28, 2011)
- "Sweet season: Apples and honey for Rosh Hashanah" (Jewish Telegraphic Agency, September 19, 2011)
- "A Summer Favorite: Tomatoes" (Jewish Link)
- "Healthy Salmon Dishes" (Jewish Link)
- "Cheese Is Pleasing" (Jewish Link)
- "Sabich: For Yom Ha’Atzmaut or Anytime" (Jewish Link)
- "Passover Sweets: Cookies and Candies" (Jewish Link)
- "Potato Soup for Winter" (Jewish Link)
- "Don’t Get Into a Stew! Make One for Dinner" (Jewish Link)
- "Warm Winter Drinks" (Jewish Link)
- "Crepes—A Fancy, Fun Dessert" (Jewish Link)
- "Chili for Winter" (Jewish Link)
