= Abraham Kohen Kaplan =

Russian Hebrew writer and translator

Abraham Kaplan
- Born: 25 July 1839; Wilke, Kovno Governorate, Russian Empire
- Died: 2 February 1897 (aged 57); Vienna, Austria-Hungary
- Writing career
- Literary movement: Haskalah

Abraham Kohen Kaplan (Yiddish: אברהם כהן קאַפלאַן; 25 July 1839 – 2 February 1897) was a Russian Hebrew writer, poet, and translator.

== Biography ==
Abraham Kaplan was born into a Jewish family in the town of Wilke, Kovno Governorate. Having acquired a reputation as a good Hebrew writer at home, he moved to Vienna, where he followed the profession of a publicist until his death.

Kaplan was the author of the following works: Mistere ha-Yehudim (Warsaw, 1865), a Hebrew translation of the first volume of the historical novel Die Geheimnisse der Juden of Hermann Reckendorf; Ḥayye Abraham Mapu (Vienna, 1870), a biography of the Hebrew writer Abraham Mapu, with two appendices containing Moshe 'immanu, a poem in praise of Moses Montefiore, and Se'u zimrah, a hymn in honour of the choral society Kol Zimrah of Krakow; Tzarah ve-neḥamah (Vienna, 1872), a Hebrew adaptation from the German novel Die falsche Beschuldigung by Leopold Weisel (Vienna, 1872); Divre yeme ha-Yehudim (Vienna, 1875), a Hebrew translation of the third volume of Heinrich Grätz's Geschichte der Juden (Vienna, 1875); Kelimah ve-belimah (Vienna, 1882), two satirical poems; Moshe Moshe (Vienna, 1884), poem on the celebration of the centenary of Moses Montefiore; and Ha-shemesh (Krakow, 1889), reflections on the sun, its nature and substance.

Kaplan frequently contributed to the Hebrew periodicals, and was involved in press polemics on the merit of the works of Smolenskin, which he defended against their critics. Kaplan's defense provoked the publication of the pamphlet Kohen lelo-Elohim (Warsaw, 1878), in which Kaplan was violently attacked.

== Selected publications ==
- Mistere ha-Yehudim. Vol. 1. Warsaw: Defus shel R. Yoel Lebenzohn. 1865. hdl:2027/nnc1.cu58930370.
- Ḥayye Abraham Mapu. Vienna. 1870. hdl:2027/osu.32435017391905.
- Tzarah ve-neḥamah. Vienna. 1872.
- Divre yeme ha-Yehudim. Vienna: Verlag von Brüder Winter. 1875. hdl:2027/hvd.hwn6uk.
- Kelimah ve-belimah. Vienna: Defus Moritz Knopplmakher. 1882.
- Moshe Moshe. Vienna. 1884.
- Ha-shemesh. Krakow: Druck von Josef Fischer. 1889. hdl:2027/hvd.hwpw5u.
