= Kaplan Business School =

Australian independent higher education institution

Coordinates: 33.8646°S 151.2044°E

- Company type: Private
- Industry: Education, Business
- Headquarters: Sydney, Australia
- Area served: Australia
- Key people: Robert Regan (Managing Director) Steve Knussen (Executive Director) Dr James Adonopoulos (Academic Dean)
- Parent: Kaplan, Inc.
- Website: https://www.kbs.edu.au

Kaplan Business School is a higher education institution in Australia. The school began offering degrees in 2008, in Adelaide, before expanding to other major cities across Australia.

It is part of Kaplan International, headquartered in London, which is a division of Kaplan Inc., a wholly owned subsidiary of Graham Holdings Company.

== History ==
Kaplan Business School, as of 2020, has been re-registered by the Australian Government (Tertiary Education Quality and Standards Agency, or TEQSA) for seven years with no conditions. Its postgraduate courses were re-accredited in 2019, also for seven years (the maximum permitted under TEQSA regulations).

Kaplan Business School operates from seven campuses in Adelaide, Brisbane, Melbourne, Perth and Sydney. It offers postgraduate programs in business, accounting, and business analytics, as well as undergraduate courses in business-related academic disciplines including accounting, management, marketing, and hospitality and tourism management.

In 2020, Kaplan Business School expanded into a fifth state, Western Australia.

== Accolades ==
Kaplan Business School has received recognition for its student support and welfare services, winning the Student Support category of the 2021 PIEonner Awards for its COVID-19 Student Welfare Plan, being a finalist in the Student Support category of the 2019 Awards. In addition, it was recognized by the NSW Government, through being a finalist in its NSW International Student Awards in 2020 and 2021, and was shortlisted in the 2020 Australian Financial Review Higher Education Awards.

Student satisfaction is above the national sector average, particularly in the areas of teaching quality and student support services, according to the Department of Education's Quality Indicators for Learning and Teaching (QILT) Student Experience Survey. Recent graduate satisfaction is also above the national average, and the QILT Graduate Outcomes Survey reported that graduates from Kaplan Business School postgraduate programs had higher graduate employment rates and median salaries than the higher education sector average.
