= University of Wollongong Sydney Business School =

Sydney Business School, University of Wollongong
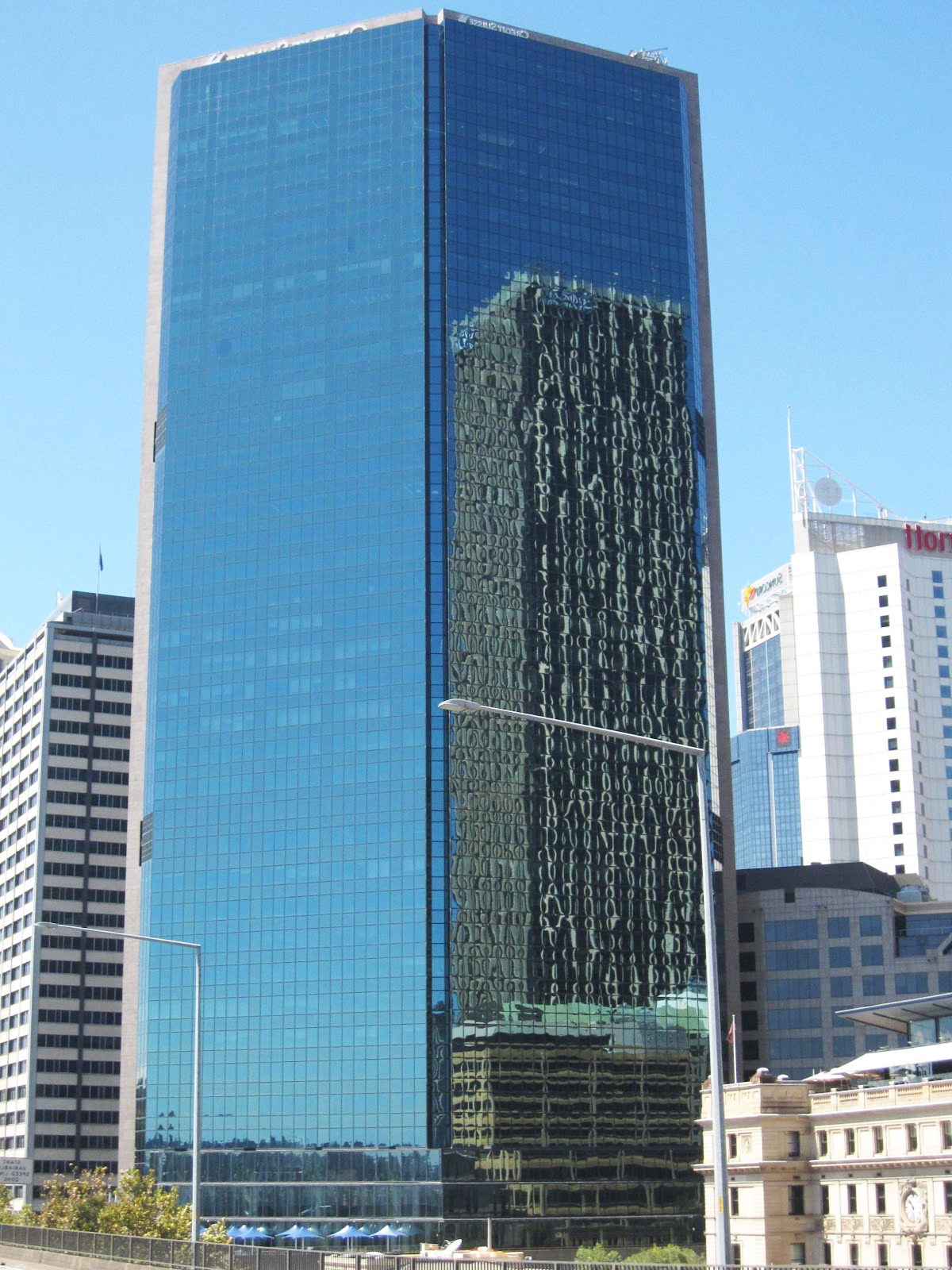
- The Sydney Business School’s Circular Quay Campus
- Established: 1997
- Parent institution: University of Wollongong
- Dean: Associate Professor Grace McCarthy
- Postgraduates: 1,200+ full-time and part-time
- Location: Sydney and Wollongong, Australia
- Website: sydneybusinessschool.edu.au

The Sydney Business School, University of Wollongong (UOW), was established in 1997. It is the graduate school of the Faculty of Business and offers postgraduate business programs at UOW's Sydney CBD Campus and Wollongong Campus.

== Campuses and Facilities ==
=== Sydney CBD Campus ===
The Sydney CBD Campus of the Sydney Business School is located in Darling Harbour in the Sydney CBD. The campus features classrooms, a library, a student lounge, and meeting rooms. It is one of three University of Wollongong campuses located in Sydney.

=== Wollongong Campus ===
The Wollongong Campus is located at Northfields Avenue, Wollongong, and is the University of Wollongong's main campus. This campus features teaching spaces, a library, cafes and restaurants, sports fields, a gymnasium, and on campus student accommodations. The campus has a population of over 25,000 UOW students.

== Programs ==
The Sydney Business School at the University of Wollongong offers a range of postgraduate business courses delivered in person from Wollongong and Sydney, and online, including graduate certificates, graduate diplomas, and master's degrees.

In 2025, the school's offerings included:

- Graduate Certificate in Applied Finance
- Graduate Certificate in Business
- Graduate Certificate in Business Administration
- Graduate Certificate in Business Analytics
- Graduate Certificate in Financial Technology
- Graduate Certificate in Human Resource Management
- Graduate Certificate in Marketing
- Graduate Certificate in Professional Accounting
- Graduate Certificate in Project Leadership and Management
- Graduate Certificate in Sustainable Supply Chain Management
- Graduate Diploma in Business Administration
- Master of Applied Finance
- Master of Business
- Master of Business Administration
- Master of Business Analytics
- Master of Financial Management
- Master of Financial Technology
- Master of Human Resource Management
- Master of Innovation and Entrepreneurship
- Master of International Business
- Master of Management
- Master of Marketing
- Master of Professional Accounting
- Master of Project Management
- Master of Supply Chain Management

== Affiliations ==
The UOW Sydney Business School is affiliated with a range of professional associations representing management education institutions, these include:

- The Association to Advance Collegiate Schools of Business (AACSB)
- The European Foundation for Management Development (EFMD)
- Principles for Responsible Management Education (PRME)
- The Association of Asia-Pacific Business Schools (AAPBS)

== Notable alumni ==
- Brendan Lyon - Chief Executive of Infrastructure Partnerships Australia
- Dr. Stephen Martin - CEO, CEDA
- Russell Packer - National Rugby League
