= Phulchand Prithvi Raj =

- Born: September 13, 1931; Bagri Sajjanpur, Princely state of Jaipur of British India now (Rajasthan, India)
- Died: February 27, 2016 (aged 84)
- Citizenship: US
- Education: Mysore Medical College
- Spouse: Susan Martin Raj (1963-2016)
- Children: 3
- Medical career
- Profession: professor; anesthesiologist; interventional pain management physician
- Field: anesthesiology; interventional pain management
- Institutions: Texas Tech University Health Science Center; Professor Emeritus Department of Anesthesiology and Pain; Interventional pain management
- Research: interventional pain management
- Awards: 1990 The Gaston Labat Award, ASRA; 1995 Nils Lofgren Award - Astra Pharmaceuticals For Outstanding Contributions to the Field of Regional Anesthesia; 1995 Distinguished Academician - Academy of Medicine, Singapore; 2000 Carl Koller Award – ESRA; 2003 Lifetime Achievement Award - Foundations of Interventional Pain Management, San Diego, California; 2005 Distinguished Service Award - ASRA, Toronto, Canada

Phulchand Prithvi Raj (September 13, 1931 – February 27, 2016) was an Indian American physician and anesthesiologist specializing in interventional pain management. His name is associated with regional anesthesia and interventional pain management, including development of multiple training programs, training of thousands of individual physicians, numerous publications, and organization of interventional pain management as a distinct specialty. Some felt his death created a void in interventional pain management across the globe. Some of his major contributions during his career involved the development and implementation of regional anesthesia and interventional pain management.

== Personal background ==
Phulchand Prithvi Raj Borundia was born September 13, 1931, in Bagri Sajjanpur, a small village approximately 100 miles west of Jaipur, Jaipur State, princely state of British India from 1128 to 1948, now the state of Rajasthan, India. His parents were Badani Bai (mother) and Phool Chandji Borundia (father).

During the pursuit of orthopedic surgery training, he met and married his Susan Martin, who was training as a nurse, in Darlington in 1963. She also became his working partner professionally. They had 3 children together named Mark, Maya, and Sarah. He had 7 grandchildren named Saijal, Cameron, Devi, Christopher, Brevin, Colin, and Enzo. After retirement in 2003, he and his wife lived in Cincinnati, Ohio.

== Education ==
P. Prithvi Raj completed high school at St. Joseph's Boys' High School, Bangalore, Karnataka, India. Raj graduated from Mysore Medical College. He did his residency in orthopedics.

Dr. Raj entered a rotating internship in orthopedics at St. Mary’s Hospital, Waterbury, Connecticut. He started his residency in anesthesia in 1963 at Parkland Memorial Hospital in Dallas, Texas. He completed his third year of residency in Norway.

== Professional background ==
Raj was on the faculty at a number of universities in England, Norway, and throughout the United States. He was also one of the founders of the American Society of Regional Anesthesia (ASRA), the Texas Pain Society, and World Institute of Pain, along with fellowship examination in interventional pain management offered across the globe. He also founded or cofounded multiple journals including Pain Practice and Pain Digest He was a prolific writer and historian.

Dr Raj started as a house officer in 1958 in Ashton-under-Lyne, Manchester, and became registrar in 1962. After achieving his residency in orthopedics, Raj decided to take his career to the United States. Raj entered a rotating internship at St. Mary’s Hospital, Waterbury, Connecticut.

Dr. Raj started his anesthesiology residency under chairman, Dr. Pepper Jenkins, in 1963 at Parkland Memorial Hospital in Dallas, Texas. He completed his third year of residency in Norway.

Dr. Raj was not only innovative and pioneering in scientific aspects, but also in promoting the specialty of regional anesthesia and interventional pain management. He was one of the 5 founders of ASRA in 1975. The history of the refounding of the ASRA, now known as the American Society of Regional Anesthesia and Pain Medicine (ASRA-PM), dates back to late 1973 when 5 dreamers met, now called the founding fathers of the ASRA, to form a society devoted to teach regional anesthesia. These 5 pioneers of regional anesthesia were Alon Winnie, Donald Bridenbaugh, Harold Carron, Prithvi Raj, and Jordan Katz.

== Selected works ==
During a 5-year career in Dallas, Raj has researched many areas and is published in many forms. Among them are:

- Acute epiglottis in children: a respiratory emergency
- Oxidation drug metabolism in human liver microsomes
- Techniques for fiberoptic laryngoscope in anesthesia
- The site of action of intravenous regional anesthesia
- The use of the nerve stimulator with standard unsheathed needles in nerve blockage
- Infraclavicular brachial plexus - a new approach
- A new single-position supine approach to sciatic-femoral nerve block
- Physiology and pharmacokinetics of continuous infusions
- Experience with volumetric infusion pumps for continuous epidural analgesia
