= Arizona Summit Law School =

Defunct law school in Phoenix, Arizona

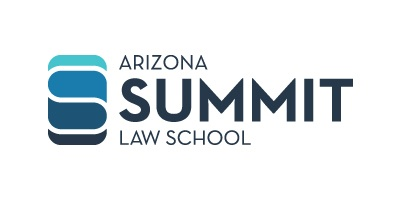
- Parent school: InfiLaw System
- Established: 2005; Closed 2018
- School type: For profit law school
- Dean: Penny Willrich
- Location: Phoenix, Arizona, US; 33.448563°N 112.073199°W
- Bar pass rate: 20.1% (July 2017)
- ABA profile: accreditation withdrawn

The Arizona Summit Law School was a for-profit law school in Phoenix, Arizona, that operated from 2005 to 2018. The law school was known until 2013 as the Phoenix School of Law, and was a part of the InfiLaw System of independent, for-profit law schools, which includes Florida Coastal School of Law and Charlotte School of Law, owned by Sterling Partners.

Although the school was accredited by the American Bar Association (ABA) in 2010, it was controversial for its poor bar exam pass rates and unemployability of its students. The school created controversy in 2015, when the dean reportedly paid underprepared students not to take the bar exam. In 2016, nearly 95 percent of its students failed to pass the bar exam. The ABA withdrew the school's accreditation effective July 9, 2018, and the school began closing in the fall of that year.

== Employment ==
According to Arizona Summit's official 2018 ABA-required disclosures, 34.4% of the Class of 2017 obtained full-time, long-term, JD-required employment nine months after graduation, excluding solo practitioners.

ABA Employment Summary for 2015 Graduates
1. Employed - Bar Passage Required 54 (35.8%)
2. Employed - J.D. Advantage 29 (19.2%)
3. Employed - Professional Position 28 (18.5%)
4. Employed - Non-Professional Position 4 (2.65%)
5. Pursuing Graduate Degree Full Time 6 (3.97%)
6. Unemployed - Not Seeking 7 (4.64%)
7. Unemployed - Seeking 23 (15.2%)
Employment status of 151 graduates in total

In July 2017, the school had the lowest bar passage rate in Arizona, with 25.7% of first time test takers passing compared to 76.1% for Arizona State University and 74.3% for University of Arizona. The state's total passage rate was 69.4% for first time test takers and 56.6% overall.

== Costs ==
The total cost of attendance (indicating the cost of tuition, fees, and living expenses) at Arizona Summit for the 2014-2015 academic year was $64,856. The Law School Transparency estimated debt-financed cost of attendance for three years is $243,864. The median amount of debt for program graduates was $178,263. The school offered controversial conditional scholarships to students that can be reduced or eliminated based on overall grade point average, rather than academic standing. During the 2015-2016 academic year, 73 students had their conditional scholarship reduced or eliminated.

== Campus ==
The school had been located in the Phelps Dodge Tower, a 20-story building in downtown Phoenix, until August 2018, when it was evicted for failure to pay rent.

== Academics ==
Critics contend that Arizona Summit's admissions process was close to a fully open unselective enrollment system. Arizona Summit's Fall 2016 entering class had a median GPA of 2.96 and a median LSAT score of 143 (20th percentile of test takers). The 25th percentile of admitted students had a GPA of 2.55 and an LSAT score of 140 (13th percentile of test takers). The school admitted 64.1% of applicants. Last year, the school lost 99 first year students (33% of the class). Forty-one students failed out of the program, 35 transferred, and 23 left for other reasons.

The school says its mission is based upon three pillars: (1) a student-centered educational experience; (2) supporting programs that allow for professionally prepared graduates; and (3) commitment to underserved communities.

- Clinical Programs: SummitLaw houses a Mediation Clinic and other clinical programs designed to develop and enhance practice skills. Courses are offered in trial and appellate practice, mediation and alternative methods of dispute resolution. Clinical methods are used in various courses throughout the curriculum.
- Externships: SummitLaw offers qualified, upper-level students in good academic standing opportunities to participate in a for-credit externship program. Students attend a classroom component that provides a link between the placement setting and the learning process.
- Mentoring Programs: Each student is assigned a faculty member as their mentor. The faculty member helps to guide the student through their law school experience and form a professional relationship that will carry into their future career.

Nevertheless, legal scholars dispute the for-profit school's mission. Many legal academics contend that Arizona Summit admits students who have little chance of passing the bar or obtaining employment after graduation, in order to receive hundreds of millions of dollars in student loans.

U.S. News & World Report did not report the rank of Arizona Summit in 2016. US News only ranks the top three-fourths of law schools.

In May 2017, the Arizona State Board for Private Postsecondary Education, the state's licensing authority governing for-profit educational institutions, voted to require the law school to post a $1.5 million surety bond, to be potentially paid out to students in the event the school closes down.

== Reputation ==
- Students admitted for the Fall of 2014 to Arizona Summit Law School had a median GPA of 2.94 and a median LSAT Score of 144.
- The July 2015 bar passage rate for first time bar takers from Arizona Summit Law School was 30.6%. Out of 144 first time takers, only 44 achieved a passing score on the bar. With those retaking the bar included, the passage rate sinks to 26.4%.
- The February 2016 bar passage rate for first time bar takers from Arizona Summit Law School was 38.1%. Out of 97 first time takers, only 37 achieved a passing score on the bar. With those retaking the bar included, the passage rate sinks to 28.4%.
- Arizona Summit's July 2016 Arizona bar passage rate for first time writers was 24.6%. Out of 73 first time test writers, only 18 achieved a passing score. The school's total July 2016 Arizona bar passage rate was 19.7%.
- Arizona Summit's July 2017 Arizona Bar passage rate for first time writers was 25.7%. Out of 35 first time test writers, only 9 achieved a passing score. The school's total July 2017 Arizona bar passage rate was 20.1%.

Previously, the Chairman of the Board was Dennis Archer, a former Mayor of Detroit, Michigan Supreme Court justice and the first African-American president of the American Bar Association.

A 2012 report showed that 18% of first-year students at Arizona Summit had transferred to other law schools. This led to a policy in which transfer students were required to meet with an adviser before their transcripts would be released.

Recording of oral arguments during appeal to the Ninth Circuit.

In 2013, two professors filed a lawsuit against the school, alleging that they had been fired for objecting to a new policy related to student transfers, among other policy changes. The complaint was subsequently dismissed by District Court. The plaintiffs appealed to the US Court of Appeals for the Ninth Circuit. The United States Court of Appeals for the Ninth Circuit affirmed on May 22, 2017.

The school created controversy in 2015, when the dean reportedly paid underprepared students not to take the bar exam.

== Accreditation withdrawal and shutdown ==
On March 27, 2017, Arizona Summit was notified by the ABA that the school had been placed on probation. Arizona Summit became the second InfiLaw school to be placed on probation by the ABA. Charlotte School of Law was placed on probation in November 2016.

In January 2018, the ABA issued a letter stating that the school's financial strength was insufficient to carry out legal education that met the ABA's standards and gave the school until February 1, 2018, to submit a report on its efforts to improve its financial position.

The ABA withdrew approval in June 2018. The ABA approved the school's "teach-out plan" in November 2018 as the school ceased operations.

== See also ==
- List of defunct law schools in the United States
