= Willrich =

Willrich is a surname. Notable people with the surname include:

- Chris Willrich (born 1967), American science fiction and fantasy writer
- Jean Willrich (born 1953), German-American soccer player
- Mason Willrich (born 1933), American law professor, arms control, and energy expert
- Michael Willrich, American historian
- Penny Willrich, American lawyer, academic administrator, and judge
- Wolfgang Willrich (1897–1948), German artist
