= Michael A. Ramos =

American attorney

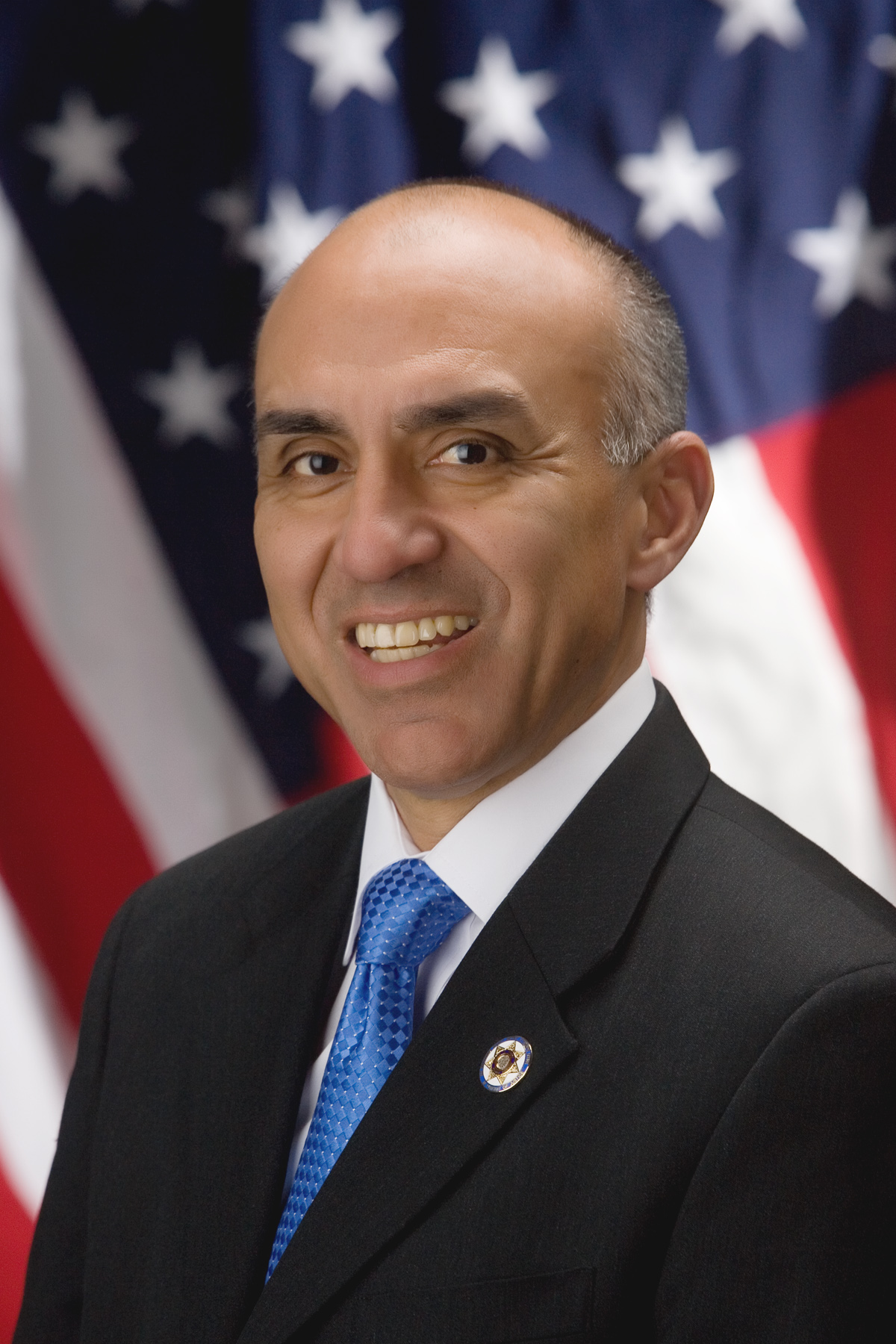

35th San Bernardino County District Attorney
- In office January 4, 2002 – January 3, 2019
- Succeeded by: Jason Anderson

Personal details
- Born: Michael Anthony Ramos; August 5, 1957 (age 69) Redlands, California, U.S.
- Party: Republican
- Education: University of California, Riverside; Citrus Belt Law School
- Website: Government website

Michael Anthony "Mike" Ramos (born August 5, 1957) is an American attorney. He was the 35th district attorney of San Bernardino County, California. He was first elected in 2002 and is the first Hispanic district attorney elected in San Bernardino County. He was defeated June 2018 by Jason Anderson, a former prosecutor and Ontario, California council member.

== Early life and education ==
The eldest of three children, Ramos was born at Redlands Community Hospital in Redlands, California, in 1957. Ramos attended Redlands High School. After graduating in 1976, Ramos earned his bachelor's degree in sociology from the University of California, Riverside, in 1980 and a Doctorate of Jurisprudence from Citrus Belt Law School in Riverside in 1988. Notably, this law school was unaccredited in the state of California, and has since closed its doors. He was admitted to the California bar in 1989. Ramos' government service began in 1980, when he started as a group counselor with the Probation Department and then later became a probation officer. He started his career with the District Attorney's Office in June 1989, as a deputy district attorney in the Major Crimes Unit.

== San Bernardino County District Attorney ==
Ramos was elected in 2002 and reelected in 2006, 2010 and 2014. He served as president of the California District Attorneys Association and as chair of the Corrections and Reentry Committee for the National District Attorneys Association.

== Family ==
Ramos has been married to his wife Gretchen for 30 years. He has two children. His grandparents came to the U.S. from Mexico, and his father served in the United States Marine Corps.

== Issues ==
=== Death penalty ===
Ramos is in favor of capital punishment. In November 2012, Ramos campaigned heavily against Proposition 34, also known as the SAFE California Act. Proposition 34 sought to replace California's death penalty with a life sentence with no chance of parole as the maximum punishment for murder. The initiative to repeal the death penalty failed by a narrow margin of 52.8% to 47.2%. In 2016, Ramos co-chaired the Death Penalty Reform Initiative Committee for Proposition 66 which sought to keep the death penalty in California. On Nov. 9, 2016, the initiative passed with 51.13% of the vote.

=== Victims' rights ===
Ramos was appointed by Governor Arnold Schwarzenegger to serve on the Governor's Victim Compensation and Government Claims Board on January 23, 2004. After being elected to his first term, one of the first actions that Ramos took was placing the supervisor in charge of victim services on his executive staff, elevating the position to the role of a chief, and creating the Bureau of Victim Services Unit. In 2013, during Crime Victims' Rights Week, Ramos announced that his office had contracted with One Call, an automated phone system, in an effort to reach crime victims and give them information about their rights and possible compensation. Crime victims who provide law enforcement with a land line phone number will get the recorded message that tells them they have rights under the state's 2008 Victims' Bill of Rights Act, passed by voters as Proposition 9. It is most often referred to as Marsy's Law.

=== Public corruption ===
In a stunning rebuke of Ramos, a high-profile criminal case against four men collapsed in September 2017, with one newspaper later calling the prosecution a “boondoggle.”

Ramos and then-Attorney General Jerry Brown had announced in 2011 a corruption prosecution against Paul Biane, a former 2nd District supervisor; Jim Erwin, former chief of staff for 3rd District Supervisor Neil Derry; Mark Kirk, former chief of staff for 4th District Supervisor Gary Ovitt; and Jeff Burum, general partner with Colonies Partners LP.

A jury acquitted three of the defendants, Jeff Burum, Paul Biane and Mark Kirk, and charges against the fourth defendant, Jim Erwin, were dropped after a separate jury deadlocked. Several jurors said they believed key prosecution witnesses had lied and questioned why the case was ever brought in the first place. By early 2018, all of the defendants had filed separate claims against the county and the state of California, citing malicious prosecution and seeking in total more than $100 million for damages.

=== Human trafficking ===
In 2009, Ramos created the county's Coalition Against Sexual Exploitation (C.A.S.E.). C.A.S.E. brought together a partnership of county departments including the District Attorney's Office, Sheriff's Department, Probation Department, County Superintendent of Schools, Department of Children and Family Services, Public Defender, and Department of Behavioral Health, to raise awareness and to provide enhanced county and community resources to victims. He campaigned heavily in favor of Proposition 35 which voters overwhelmingly passed in 2012 and which created a Human Trafficking Prosecution Unit. In an effort to reduce the demand for victims of human trafficking, Ramos started the Stop the John Project in 2013 and began releasing the names and photographs of those defendants convicted of solicitation in San Bernardino County. In September 2014 Ramos made a blog post mistaking the popular BDSM web page "The Slave Registry" for a human trafficking / prostitution front.

=== Prevention and intervention ===
Through the Juvenile Justice Crime Prevention Act (JJCPA), the DA office implemented the "Let's End Truancy" (L.E.T.) Project, which works to improve school attendance for previously truant students, discourage future truancy and helps to make education a priority for at-risk youth. One step that Ramos took to address the problem of truancy was arresting parents for failure to address the issue.

Ramos also has various other programs such as Camp Good Grief and the Gang Resistance Intervention Partnership (GRIP). Camp Good Grief is a three-day grief camp for children and teens whose lives have been shattered due to an act of murder or suicide. The San Bernardino County District Attorney's Office, in partnership with Loma Linda University Children's Hospital, offer the camp.

=== Animal cruelty ===
In 2011, in conjunction with the Humane Society of the United States and Fontana Animal Services, Ramos released a short film to increase awareness about the dangers of cockfighting. To better focus on animal abuse, in 2012 Ramos created the San Bernardino County Illegal Animal Fighting and Abuse Task Force, a multi-disciplinary collaboration designed to promote community awareness, education and prosecution of animal fighting and abuse in San Bernardino County.
