= Martins Ihezuo =

Nigerian politician

Member House of Representatives
- Incumbent
- Assumed office 2023

Personal details
- Education: University of Lagos, University of Northern Carolina; John F Kennedy School of Law

Ikenna Martins Ihezuo is a Nigerian politician who is currently serving as a member of the state assembly of Imo State.

== Early life and education ==
Martins hails from Eziachi in Orlu LGA and he is the son of Chief Lolo John Ihezuo. He obtained his West African School Certificate from Government secondary school, Owerri and later attended Federal school of Arts and science, Ondo and University of Lagos for post secondary school education. He later bagged masters and doctorate degrees from John F Kennedy School of Law in Walnut Creek and the University of Northern California. After returning to Nigeria, he completed the Nigerian Law School in 2009 and was duly called to the Nigerian Bar.

== Legal career ==
Ikenna Ihezuo is the Principal Partner of I.I. Martins & Associates, a legal firm with offices in Abuja and Owerri. He is also an active member of the Nigeria Bar Association, Orlu branch.

== Political career ==
In 2019, he was a candidate of Action Alliance and contested for Orlu,Orsu and Oru East Federal House of Representatives. After the election, he deflected to All progressive Congress and in 2023 he was elected as a member of the state of assembly representing Orlu. His election was a notable achievement for the Eziachi community, making him the second person from the area to be elected to the state legislature, eight years after the first. Within the Assembly, he chairs the House Services Committee and also serves as Vice Chairman of the Health Committee. He is a member of the Judiciary & Information Committee, as well as the Mines & Solid Minerals Committee.

== Legislative Activities & Public Service ==
- In March 2024, he sponsored a motion advocating for the rehabilitation of a critical section of the Old Owerri–Orlu Road, which received co-sponsorship from eleven fellow lawmakers.
- In September 2024, serving as Chairman of the House Judiciary and Information Committee, he commended the Imo State First Lady and women across the state during the annual Women's August Meeting, recognizing their contributions to community development.
- In June 2024 he responded publicly to allegations of misappropriation of palliative rice, calling for a summons to defend his integrity before the assembly.

== Personal life ==
Ikenna Ihezuo is married and has children. He is addressed with the traditional title “Ikemba” and is known for fostering unity and community development in Orlu.
