= Hubbard House (Jacksonville) =

Domestic violence shelter in Florida

- Founded: 1976 organization started, first shelter opened
- Founder: Rita DeYoung
- Type: Non-profit Anti-abuse
- Purpose: To prevent and end domestic violence
- Location: Jacksonville, Florida
- Origins: Jacksonville Women’s Movement (JWM)
- Region served: Duval and Baker Counties
- Method: Use of shelter, counseling,
- Key people: Beth Brokelman, President; Ellen Siler, CEO; Carol Ginzig, CFO
- Revenue: $4.5 million annual budget
- Endowment: $6.5 million
- Website: http://www.hubbardhouse.org/

Hubbard House is a not-for-profit 501(c)3 entity, established in 1976, that was the first domestic violence shelter based in Florida. Hubbard House is a certified, comprehensive domestic violence center and is a nationally recognized leader in domestic violence intervention. It provides programs and services to more than 5,000 women, children, and men annually in Duval and Baker counties. Hubbard House also provided a victim advocate in Nassau County beginning in 2000. The county later established Micah's Place.

== History ==
The Jacksonville Woman's Movement purchased the first house to be used for a shelter in 1976. It was located on Hubbard Street; the name stuck and was passed on to successive facilities. A children's program that included therapeutic child care was introduced in 1979. The First Step Program was launched in July, 1981. According to the organization's website, it was "one of the first intervention programs in the...[United States] for batterers." The organization's first thrift store was opened in 1985.

== Services ==
Hubbard House is best known for its emergency shelter, but the agency also provides adult & youth outreach services, school-based education, therapeutic childcare, batterers’ intervention programs, court advocacy and volunteer/community education opportunities.

=== Emergency shelter ===
Victims of domestic violence may access Hubbard House directly through its around-the-clock hotline or through referral from law enforcement organizations, other support agencies and outreach programs. Hubbard House offers victims of domestic violence and their children food and shelter as well as counseling and other services. Length of time at Hubbard House varies, but usually does not extend beyond six weeks.

- Safety: Hubbard House coordinates with the police and court systems to ensure physical safety of domestic violence victims. If victims do not have their own cell phones, the center will provide them phones that can be used to call 911 in an emergency. Hubbard House accepts old cell phones, chargers & batteries and reprograms them for emergency use.
- Legal: Hubbard House hosts monthly legal clinics with attorneys from Jacksonville Area Legal Aid (JALA) to allow victims to learn their rights and the processes necessary to obtaining them through the law.
- Education: Job training is provided if the victim lacks marketable skills to support herself and her children. For children, access is provided to the shelter's fully accredited school.
- Housing: When the family leaves Hubbard House, the program helps provide adequate housing.

== Facilities ==
Formerly located in an old, overcrowded house downtown, the Hubbard House opened in a new location in April, 1997, a $3.2 million facility that also included offices and daycare. The location of the center is only disclosed to those who have a need to know. The center is a physically secure facility (including parking) to protect victims from their abusers.

The Hubbard House Outreach Center and Thrift Store opened November 17, 2008. The $750,000 outreach center offers services that include adult and youth counseling, case management services, crisis intervention, advocacy, support groups for victims, and Helping At Risk Kids (HARK), a therapeutic intervention and prevention program designed to empower children from abusive homes. The outreach center should serve approximately 3,000 people each year.

== Revenue and budget ==
The center operates on a $4.5 million annual budget, more than 90 percent of that coming from government sources. Federal, State and Local funding levels are not guaranteed, and payments can be delayed for many reasons. Other sources of income include United Way, revenue from the center's Thrift store, donations from corporations & individuals, and fund-raising events sponsored by the center (such as their annual tennis tournament) or by other groups on their behalf.

=== Foundation ===
The Hubbard House Foundation was established to raise endowed funds after CSX Transportation CEO Michael Ward and his wife, Terry, donated $2.5 million to Hubbard House in February, 2006. At the time of the Ward donation, the organization had an endowment of about $100,000 and often had less than a month's operating expenses in the bank. The center added $1 million of the donation to their endowment, funded construction of the $750,000 outreach center, and used the remainder of the gift to expand the staff.

=== $1 million challenge ===
In February, 2008, the Wards challenged the First Coast to fight domestic violence by matching their 2007 $1 million donation to Hubbard House.

== Other facilities ==
- Quigley House - Clay County, Florida
- Betty Griffin House - St. Johns County, Florida
- Micah's Place - Nassau County, Florida
