= Alben W. Barkley School of Law =

Defunct private, for-profit law school in Paducah, Kentucky

- Type: Private
- Active: 2004–2008
- Dean: Larry O. Putt
- Location: Paducah, Kentucky, US
- Campus: Urban

The Alben W. Barkley School of Law (formerly the American Justice School of Law) was a private for-profit law school founded in 2004 in Paducah, Kentucky and closed on December 31, 2008.

== History ==
The school's founding dean was Paul M. Hendrick, formerly assistant dean, acting dean, and faculty member of Florida Coastal School of Law. The first class entered in the fall of 2005, consisting of 61 students from 27 states.

=== Lawsuit ===
In November 2007, Thomas L. Osborne, the chairman of AJSL's board and attorney for AJSL, resigned. To enhance connectivity with the regional community, AJSL formed a new board of trustees.

On November 17, 2007, Osborne filed a federal lawsuit on behalf of a minority of the student body and himself as a shareholder of the school. None of these claims was ever proved in court. All claims were withdrawn and dismissed in the settlement in which the new owners supported by Osborne agreed to assume the school's existing debts. These claims were vigorously denied by all of the law school board members, and all of these claims were withdrawn in a settlement agreement agreed to by all parties before any hearings were held in the Federal Court. Judge Russell incorporated the settlement agreement in his order dismissing the case.

According to Dean Hendrick's statement to the Paducah Sun, the lawsuit boiled down to an attempted hostile takeover of the law school. The new owners assumed the debts of the school.

Thirty of a total 185 students chose to join the suit against Hendrick, Turner, and Shelton. All claims in the complaint were withdrawn in the settlement agreement and the suit was dismissed by the Court. The majority of law school shares were transferred in the settlement to a local physician, Dr. Laxmaiah Manchikanti.

=== Closure ===
Hendrick and Associate Dean Jerrod Turner resigned their positions in February 2008. John Daughaday was appointed the acting Dean and Robert Collins was appointed acting Associate Dean of the law school. The new owners assumed the debts of American Justice School of Law in the settlement agreement approved by the court.

In March 2008, Daughaday and Collins resigned. That same month, it was renamed the Alben W. Barkley School of Law.

On Wednesday, October 22, 2008, the owner of the Barkley School of Law, Laxmaiah Manchikanti, released a written statement announcing that the school would close as of December 31, 2008. The new owners had filed for bankruptcy in September 2008.

== Accreditation ==
The Alben W. Barkley School of Law was not accredited by the American Bar Association (ABA) although it had sought accreditation. In August 2007, the ABA denied the Barkley School of Law's provisional accreditation on its first application.

== Campus ==
The Alben W. Barkley School of Law was located in the Paducah Information Age Park Resource Center. As of late December 2007, the physical facilities consisted of approximately 68,000 square feet (6,300 m^{2}).

== See also ==
- List of defunct law schools in the United States
