= Laxmaiah =

Laxmaiah can be a masculine given name or a surname. Notable people with the name include:

- Laxmaiah Manchikanti, Indian-American physician
- Mallepally Laxmaiah, Indian journalist
