= Schleimer =

Schleimer is a German language occupational surname for a maker of glue or bird lime and may refer to:

- Catherine Schleimer-Kill (1884–1973), Luxembourg suffragist and women's rights activist
- Irving Schleimer (1921–2005), Law school dean
- Joe Schleimer (1909–1988), Canadian freestyle sport wrestler
- Lukas Schleimer (1999), German professional footballer
