= John Prunskis =

American physician, diplomat, and businessman

John V. Prunskis
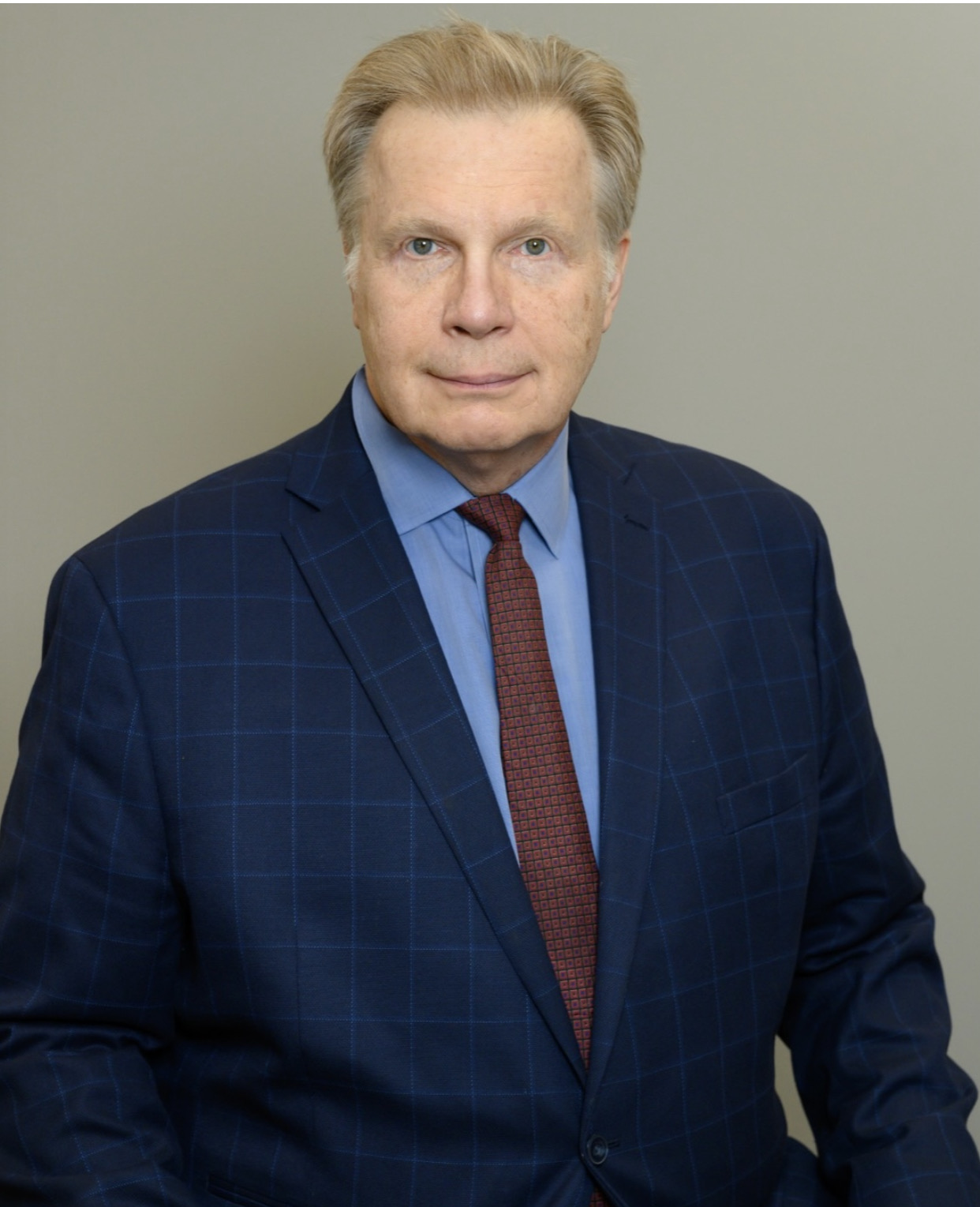
- Born: John Prunskis; Chicago, IL
- Known for: Interventional pain physician Hon. Consul of Lithuania to the United States (Colorado)
- Medical career
- Profession: Physician
- Field: Interventional pain management, adult stem-cell therapy
- Awards: Knight of the Order of Merit, Lithuania; Castle Connolly Top Doctor; U.S. News & World Report Top Doctor

John Prunskis is an American physician, diplomat, business leader, and professor. From 2017 to 2020, he served as a White House Presidential Appointee. During that tenure, he co-authored the U.S. Department of Health and Human Services' Best Practices Pain Task Force Final Report, which remains a current guideline on how painful conditions should be diagnosed and treated in the United States. Prunskis received the Knight of the Order of Merit from the President of Lithuania for his professional and philanthropic contributions. Prunskis is the cofounder of Illinois Pain Institute and The Regenerative Stem Cell Institute and also serves as a clinical professor at Chicago Medical School and Chief Medical Officer of DxTx Pain and Spine. He was elected to three consecutive terms as a representative of Lithuanians living in the USA to the Lithuanian Parliament / World Lithuanian Community Commission. He is a Fellow in Interventional Pain Practice (FIPP)(#78) and was an examiner for the fellow in interventional pain practice examination. Prunskis, board certified in Anesthesiology with Added Qualification in Pain Management. He served as the Hon. Consul of Lithuania in Aspen, Colorado from 2013 to 2023 and is currently the Hon. Consul of Lithuania in South Florida.

== Early life and education ==
Prunskis was born in Chicago, Illinois, to Lithuanian immigrant parents. He attended University of Chicago Lab School and Brother Rice High School. He then earned an undergraduate degree from the University of Chicago and a medical degree from the Rush Medical College in Chicago. Prunskis completed his internship in general surgery at University of Illinois and thereafter completed his residency in anesthesiology and fellowship at the Univ. Chicago hospitals. During his fellowship, he was a co-investigator and part of the team of researchers responsible for bringing propofol through FDA approval prior to introduction to the US medical market.

== Career ==
Prunskis was one of the initial clinical investigators in 1987 in the United States on the anesthetic/sedative drug Propofol.

Prunskis co-founded Illinois Pain Institute in 1992 with his wife, Terri Dallas-Prunskis, MD. Later he was named clinical professor at Chicago Medical School, where he still currently presides. He has written several academic papers and editorials on pain management including, Algorithms for Interventional Techniques in Chronic Pain. In 2012, he co-founded and was appointed as the CEO and medical director of Barrington Pain & Spine Institute, and he also serves as CEO and medical director of The Regenerative Stem Cell Institute where he was a co-investigator in the largest adult autologous stem cell research study in the United States. He currently serves as Chief Medical Officer of DxTx Pain and Spine.

In January 2010, Prunskis was elected Member of Lithuanian Parliament / World Lithuanian Community Commission, serving as chairman from 2013 to 2017. As of 2018–2021, he is serving his third term.

In 2012, the Lithuanian Ambassador to the United States nominated Prunskis as the Hon. Consul of Lithuania. He was confirmed to the position by the US State Department. In June 2012, during the World Federation of Consuls (FICAC) Congress in Monte Carlo, he was elected Dean of the Aspen Consular Corps.

In 2018, Prunskis was confirmed as one of twenty public members on the Pain Management Best Practices Inter-Agency Task Force Members. Prunskis was presidentially appointed, in part, due to over thirty years of expertise, to improve how pain is perceived, assessed, and treated at a national scale in the wake of the Opioid epidemic.

=== Honors ===
In 2024, Prunskis was recognized by his peers as a 25 year recipient of the Castle Connolly Top Doc award in Interventional Pain Management. In 2024, Prunskis was recognized by the Lithuanian Basketball Federation president Vydas Gedvilas and received the Gold Medal Award for "Significant input into the growth of awareness of Lithuanian Basketball in the United States.

== Awards ==
- Knight of the Order of Merit, Lithuania
- Sixteen-time winner of Castle Connolly Top Pain Doctor Award from 1999 to 2024
- Castle Connolly Top Doctor for 25 Years Interventional Pain management
- U.S. News & World Report Top Doctor
- American Board of Medical Specialists – Board Certified
- Inducted into the Lithuanian-American Hall of Fame May 20, 2023

== Selected publications ==
- Prunskis, J. (July 2001). "Algorithms for interventional techniques in chronic pain". Pain Physician. 4 (3): 286, author reply 286–291. ISSN 1533-3159. PMID 16900258.
- Lim, R.; Troy, S. S.; Turriff, D. E.; Prunskis, J. V. (1982). "Enucleation blocks the morphological response of glioblasts to glia maturation factor". Developmental Neuroscience. 5 (4): 308–313. doi:10.1159/000112690. ISSN 0378-5866. PMID 6291892.
- Korttila, K.; Ostman, P.; Faure, E.; Apfelbaum, J. L.; Prunskis, J.; Ekdawi, M.; Roizen, M. F. (July 1990). "Randomized comparison of recovery after propofol-nitrous oxide versus thiopentone-isoflurane-nitrous oxide anaesthesia in patients undergoing ambulatory surgery". Acta Anaesthesiologica Scandinavica. 34 (5): 400–403. doi:10.1111/j.1399-6576.1990.tb03111.x. ISSN 0001-5172. PMID 2202190. S2CID 36428319.
- Prunskis, John V.; Dallas-Prunskis, Terri (2019). "Trial SCS Leads Should Be Removed under Fluoroscopy". Neuromodulation: Technology at the Neural Interface. 22 (6): 760. doi:10.1111/ner.13028. ISSN 1525-1403. PMID 31359546. S2CID 198982186.
- "Pain Management Best Practices Inter-Agency Task Force (May 2019). "Pain Management Best Practices Inter-agency Task Force Report - Updates, Gaps, Inconsistencies, and Recommendations (Final Report)" Department of Health and Human Services, USA" (PDF).
