= Stephen G. Larson =

American judge (born 1964)

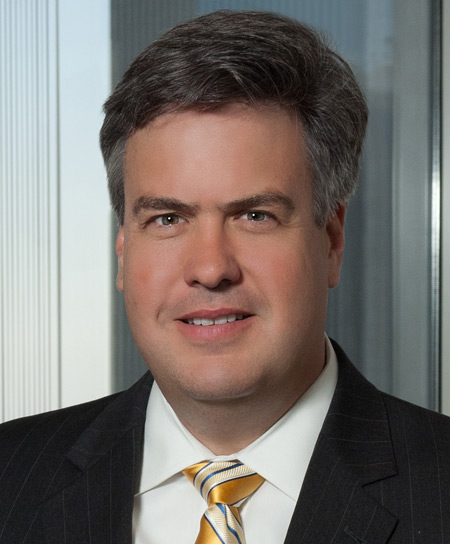

Judge of the United States District Court for the Central District of California
- In office March 20, 2006 – November 2, 2009
- Appointed by: George W. Bush
- Preceded by: Robert Timlin
- Succeeded by: Jesus Bernal

Magistrate Judge of the United States District Court for the Central District of California
- In office 2000–2006

Personal details
- Born: Stephen Gerard Larson; October 26, 1964 (age 61) Fontana, California, U.S.
- Spouse: Dena J. Nordman
- Education: Georgetown University (BSFS); University of Southern California (JD)

Stephen Gerard Larson (born October 26, 1964) is a former United States district judge of the United States District Court for the Central District of California and a partner in the Los Angeles law firm of Larson LLP, which he co-founded in 2016 as Larson O'Brien LLP. He consistently ranks among the top litigators in the U.S., having been recognized by The Best Lawyers in America© for his work in Commercial Litigation and Criminal Defense: White-Collar since 2015.

As a judge and an attorney, Larson is known for high-profile cases, including his role from 2011 to 2018 as lead defense counsel in People v. Biane et al., the case which former California Attorney General (and former governor) Jerry Brown once touted as "the biggest corruption scandal in San Bernardino County, if not the state's, history. Larson won full acquittal for developer Jeff Burum in 2017 and then represented Burum and his company, Colonies Partners, in two civil rights suits against San Bernardino County and its former District Attorney alleging malicious prosecution, among other charges. On November 24, 2020, the parties jointly announced a settlement agreement of $65 million to resolve the litigation.

Larson represents former USC water polo coach Jovan Vavic in the highly publicized “Varsity Blues” college admissions case against racketeering, conspiracy, and fraud charges. He also represents tax agent Ramin Salari charged alongside former Los Angeles County Assessor John Noguez in a public corruption case. On May 22, 2020, Larson obtained the dismissal before the California Court of Appeal of two separate cases charging Mr. Salari with numerous counts of bribery, embezzlement, and tax fraud—charges which were recently re-filed in a pair of new complaints. The case, dating back to 2012, became highly publicized after then-Los Angeles County District Attorney Steve Cooley stated that it was one of the county's most significant public corruption cases in decades. In addition to trial practice, Larson frequently advocates before court of appeals across the country. He sat by designation as a United States Court of Appeals for the Ninth Circuit judge on seven occasions during his tenure as a U.S. District Judge, since 2015 Larson has appeared before both the California Supreme Court and the Supreme Court of the United States.

Larson and United States National Security Advisor Robert C. O'Brien co-founded Larson O'Brien LLP in January 2016. Before co-founding the firm, Larson was practice leader of Arent Fox's Complex Litigation group. In addition to his trial and appellate work, Larson is a member of FedArb and is frequently engaged as an arbitrator and mediator in complex commercial disputes.

== Biography ==
=== Early life and education ===
Larson was born in Fontana, California. He received a Bachelor of Science in Foreign Service degree from Georgetown University School of Foreign Service in 1986 where he was a member of the Philodemic Society, and a Juris Doctor from the USC Gould School of Law in 1989. He was admitted to the State Bar of California in 1989.

=== Prosecutor and federal judge ===
After two years in private practice at O’Melveny & Myers, Larson began working for the United States Attorney's Office for the Central District of California. From 1991 to 2000, he led 24 criminal trials, was responsible for handling 49 appeals before the United States Court of Appeals for the Ninth Circuit, and received the U.S. Department of Justice Director's Award for Superior Performance from Attorney General Janet Reno. As chief of the office's organized crime section, Larson conducted joint training exercises and investigations with foreign law enforcement agencies in Russia, Kazakhstan, Estonia, Latvia, Poland, Ukraine, and South Korea.

Larson's work as a U.S. Attorney led him to the bench, first as a United States magistrate judge in September 2000. In December 2005, he was nominated by President George W. Bush to a seat on the United States District Court for the Central District of California vacated by Robert J. Timlin. Larson was confirmed by the United States Senate on March 16, 2006. Important cases he presided over included United States v. Nazario, involving a former Marine sergeant ultimately acquitted of manslaughter for his role in four fatal shootings during the Battle of Fallujah in Iraq; Mattel v. MGA Entertainment, the so-called "Bratz doll" case involving copyrights and trade secrets; and United States v. Duro, in which Larson blocked the U.S. Bureau of Indian Affairs' decade-long effort to close down a major migrant worker camp on the Torres Martinez Indian Reservation in the Coachella Valley.

He resigned his position September 17, 2009, and entered private practice.

=== Private practice ===
Larson joined Arent Fox in Los Angeles as a partner in 2011, became the practice leader of the Complex Litigation group in 2013, and earned a string of dismissals in high-profile white-collar and commercial litigation cases. In 2012, Larson secured dismissals of money laundering and conspiracy charges for Angela Aguilar in U.S. v. Noriega, one of the few Foreign Corrupt Practices Act cases to go to trial. Larson's push to suppress intercepted communications helped lead to the court's finding of broad government misconduct and, ultimately, a dismissal of charges against his client. In 2012, Larson successfully defended Taco Bell against a lawsuit seeking $51 million in damages over alleged unwanted telephone marketing calls. On October 25, 2012, Larson received the Jennifer Brooks Lawyer of the Year Award from the Western San Bernardino County Bar Association.

In December 2015, Larson argued before the U.S. Supreme Court on behalf of Arizona voters challenging the constitutionality of unequally populated voting districts created by a state commission. In their case, Harris v. Arizona Independent Redistricting Commission, Larson and co-counsel argued that the five-member Commission violated the Supreme Court's one-person, one-vote principle under the 14th Amendment.

Upon co-founding his firm in January 2016, Larson was quickly tapped that February to file a legal brief supporting the U.S. government's efforts to force Apple Inc. to unlock the encrypted iPhone belonging to one of the shooters in the 2015 San Bernardino attack. Soon after, he was hired to serve as interim general counsel for the Ontario International Airport Authority during the time that it was finalizing its separation from Los Angeles World Airports. Larson was also appointed by the Orange County District Attorney and the Orange County Board of Supervisors to monitor the District Attorney's compliance with a Blue Ribbon commission's recommendations related to jail informants.

Larson's 2017 defense of Mr. Burum at trial in People v. Biane et al. led to a full acquittal and a formal apology from the FBI regarding misstatements by agents following a search and seizure. In 2018, Larson received the Daily Journal's California Lawyer Attorneys of the Year (CLAY) Award for his trial advocacy in People v. Biane et al.

Also in 2017, Larson successfully represented the states of Arizona and Oklahoma in connection with their efforts to seek recovery following the Volkswagen AG emissions “Diesel Dupe” scandal, obtaining settlements totaling more than $40 million. He also obtained a $10 million jury verdict and judgment against the Rose Bowl Aquatic Center and in favor of a minor child abused at the defendant's facilities. In 2019, Larson served as trial counsel in the trial of lawsuit spanning 17 years regarding claims that the federal government mismanaged tribal assets, which resulted in settlements of $82 million and $137 million for the Quapaw Nation and tribe members.

Larson is continuously recognized by the Daily Journal as one of the “Top 100 Lawyers in California,” and by the Los Angeles Business Journal as one of the “LA500: Most Influential People in L.A." and “Leaders of Influence: Litigators & Trial Lawyers.”

=== Teaching career ===
During law school, Larson was an instructor at Daniel Murphy High School in Los Angeles from 1988 to 1989. From 1995 to 1999, he was a lecturer at California State University, Long Beach. From 1997 to 2001 he was an adjunct assistant professor at the Glendale University College of Law, and from 2001 to 2005 he was an instructor at the California Southern Law School. He was later an adjunct professor at the University of La Verne College of Law.

=== Additional work ===
On October 21, 2020, the General Assembly of the Office of American States (OAS) elected Larson to the Inter-American Juridical Committee for a four-year term beginning on January 1, 2021. He is a founding member with the U.S. Department of State in its Public-Private Partnership for Justice Reform in Afghanistan. He was also a member of the Pacific Council on International Policy and is a frequent lecturer on law and international affairs. Larson was the Distinguished Jurist in Residence and a member of the Board of Visitors at the University of La Verne College of Law and was appointed by founding Dean Erwin Chemerinsky to serve on the Dean's Advisory Council for the newly chartered law school at the University of California at Irvine. He previously served as chair of the Los Angeles County Blue Ribbon Commission on Public Safety.

In 2011, Larson, a Catholic, was awarded the Amar Es Entregarse Award from Diocese of San Bernardino.

Legal offices
Preceded by Robert Timlin	Judge of the United States District Court for the Central District of California; 2006–2009	Succeeded by Jesus Bernal
