= Raj Bothra =

American surgeon

Rajendra Bothra
- Born: India
- Occupation: Surgeon
- Known for: Interventional pain management
- Spouse: Pammy Bothra
- Children: Sonia Bothra
- Awards: Padma Shri

Rajendra Bothra is an American surgeon, humanitarian and politician of Indian origin. He is a former Chief of Surgery at the Holy Cross Hospital, Detroit and practices interventional pain management at the Pain Centre USA, Warren. He is a Fellow of the American Board of Interventional Pain Physicians (ABIPP) and is associated with Indian health organizations in conducting lectures to raise awareness of HIV/AIDS and substance abuse. He is politically aligned with the Republican Party and was appointed by George H. W. Bush as the co-chairman of the Asian-American Coalition for the 1988 United States presidential election. He was awarded the fourth highest civilian award of the Padma Shri, by the Government of India, in 1999.

On December 6, 2018, Bothra and five other physicians at The Pain Center USA were indicted for healthcare fraud and released on bond pending trial. In 2019, Bothra was taken into federal custody for misrepresenting information about his relatives, trips abroad, and assets, and he remained in custody pending trial due to flight risk. Bothra has filed eight motions to revoke his detention and appealed the denials six times. He was accused of fueling the nation's opioid epidemic, cheating Medicare, and subjecting patients to needless and painful back injections. He was acquitted on all criminal charges on June 29, 2022. On August 24, 2023, the US Department of Justice announced that Dr. Bothra had agreed to pay $6.8 million to settle two separate civil suits alleging that he had violated the False Claims Act, the first filed in 2017 and the second filed in 2019. Those qui tam (whistleblower) lawsuits were identified by the Department of Justice as "United States ex rel. Ronald Kufner et al. vs. The Pain Center USA PLLC, et al., No. 2:17-cv-11644 (E.D. Mich.) and United States ex rel. Hersh Patel vs. Interventional Pain Center, et al, No. 2:18-cv-12728 (E.D. Mich.)".

Raj Bothra co-authored a book to tell his story "USA v Raj" and a film of this is in production, due to be released in 2026.

== See also ==
- Interventional pain management
- 1988 United States presidential election
