= Steven D. Waldman =

American physician

Steven D. Waldman, M.D., J.D
- Education: University of Missouri–Kansas City, University of Kansas
- Known for: Interventional Pain Management
- Scientific career
- Fields: Pain Management; Medical Humanities and Bioethics; Medical Education
- Workplaces: Kansas City University, University of Missouri-Kansas City

Steven D. Waldman is the Chief Executive Officer of Luna, the nation’s leading provider of in-home outpatient physical therapy. Waldman is a pain management specialist, author and a pioneer in the specialty of interventional pain management. He previously held an academic appointment as Professor of Anesthesiology at Kansas City University where he served as Senior Vice Provost of Strategic Initiatives.

== Background ==
Waldman holds a Bachelor of Science degree in Geosciences from the University of Missouri–Kansas City, and was one of the first 100 students to be admitted in 1973 to its new medical school, the University of Missouri–Kansas City School of Medicine. He was elected a member of the Alpha Omega Alpha honor society and earned his MD in 1977. He completed his internship at Mayo Clinic in 1978 and did his residency in anesthesiology at the Mayo Graduate School of Medicine in Rochester, Minnesota where he also served as President of the Mayo Clinic Fellows Association.

Waldman received Masters in Business Administration In Healthcare Administration from City University in 1993 and his Juris Doctor from the University of Kansas School of Law in 1996.

== Career ==
Waldman was one of the first pain management specialists in the region, founding pain clinics at numerous Kansas City area hospitals. Waldman is credited with coining the term interventional pain management to describe this new subspecialty of pain management that was focused on the use of interventional procedures to treat pain.

He holds joint academic appointments as Clinical Professor of Anesthesiology and Professor of Medical Humanities and Bioethics at the University of Missouri–Kansas City School of Medicine. He serves as the Inaugural Chairman of the Department of Medical Humanities and Bioethics and a member of the Humanities Advisory Committee in the School of Medicine. He is a founding member of the Sirridge Office of Medical Humanities and Bioethics, helping raise the initial funding for the William Sirridge lectureship, and he is on the advisory board of the Sirridge Office.

Waldman currently serves as Professor of Anesthesiology and Senior Vice Provost of Strategic Initiatives at Kansas City University.

== Publications ==
He is the author of more than fifty-three textbooks on topics ranging from interventional pain management, ultrasound, case-based learning, and medical imaging as well as numerous scholarly publications on interventional pain management., opioids, practice management, instructional technology, and medical bioethics and humanities

=== Select bibliography ===
- Waldman, Steven D. (c. 2025). Atlas of Interventional Pain Management (6th ed.). Philadelphia: Elsevier. ISBN 9780323244282
- Waldman, Steven D. (c. 2024). Common Pain Syndromes (5th ed.). Philadelphia: Elsevier ISBN 9780443111051
- Waldman, Steven D. (c. 2024). Physical Diagnosis of Pain (5th ed.) Philadelphia: Elsevier ISBN 978-0443118036
- Waldman, Steven D. (c. 2023). Atlas of Pain Management Injection Techniques (5th ed.). Elsevier. ISBN 978-0323828260
- Waldman, Steven D. (c. 2023). Pain Medicine: A Case-Based Learning Series. Headache and Facial Pain Philadelphia: Elsevier ISBN 978-0323834568
- Waldman, Steven D. (c. 2023). Pain Medicine: A Case-Based Learning Series. The Shoulder and Elbow Philadelphia: Elsevier ISBN 978-0323758772
- Waldman, Steven D. (c. 2023). Pain Medicine: A Case-Based Learning Series. The Knee Philadelphia: Elsevier ISBN 978-0323762588
- Waldman, Steven D. (c. 2019). Optimizing Medical Education With Instructional Technology (5th ed.). Amsterdam: IGI Global Academic Press. ISBN 9781522562894.
- Waldman, Steven D. (c. 2019). Atlas of Interventional Pain Management (5th ed.). Philadelphia: Elsevier. ISBN 9780323244282.
- Waldman, Steven D. (c. 2019). Comprehensive Atlas of Ultrasound Guided Pain Management Techniques (2nd ed.). Philadelphia: Lippincott. ISBN 9781451186703.
- Waldman, Steven D. (c. 2018). Uncommon Pain Syndromes (4th ed.). Philadelphia: Elsevier.
- Waldman, Steven D. (c. 2018). Common Pain Syndromes (4th ed.). Philadelphia: Elsevier.
- Waldman, Steven D. (c. 2016). Comprehensive Atlas of Diagnostic Ultrasound of Painful Conditions. Philadelphia: Lippincott Williams Wilkins. ISBN 9781496302892.
- Waldman, Steven D. (c. 2016). Comprehensive Atlas of Diagnostic Ultrasound of Painful Foot and Ankle Conditions. Philadelphia: Lippincott Williams Wilkins. ISBN 9781496345462.
- Waldman, Steven D. (c. 2016). Pain Review (2nd ed.). Elsevier. ISBN 9780323448895.
- Waldman, Steven D. (c. 2016). Atlas of Pain Management Injection Techniques (4th ed.). Elsevier. ISBN 9780323414159.

He contributed the "Pain practice management" subsection to the book Operating room leadership and management. Waldman's Atlas of Common Pain Syndromes has been translated into Spanish, Italian and Polish.

== Awards and recognition ==
Waldman was Mayo Clinic Fellows Association President and has been the recipient of several accolades and awards:

- Alpha Omega Alpha Honor Society
- UMKC Alumni Achievement Award for service to the University and School of Medicine.
- UMKC Medical Humanities Award in recognition of his role in helping found the Sirridge Office of Medical Humanities and Bioethics at the UMKC School of Medicine and his teaching efforts in this area.
- UMKC Legacy Award (as a member of the Waldman family)
- UMKC School of Medicine Humanities Award
- UMKC Alumni Achievement Award
- Society For Pain Practice Management Distinguished Service Award
