= Julia Marvin =

American politician

Member of the Colorado House of Representatives from the 31st district
- In office January 23, 2024 – January 8, 2025
- Preceded by: Said Sharbini
- Succeeded by: Jacqueline Phillips

Personal details
- Party: Democratic

Julia Marvin is an American politician who served as member of the Colorado House of Representatives for the 31st district from 2024 to 2025.

== Political offices ==
A Democrat, Marvin served four years on the Thornton, Colorado city council for ward two. In 2023, she resigned to run for mayor, losing to Republican incumbent Jan Kulmann. On January 18, 2024, Marvin was selected by the Democratic vacancy committee to represent the 31st district following Said Sharbini's resignation. She defeated city councillor Jacque Phillips in a nine to seven vote. She is a member of the agriculture, water, and natural resources committee.

In the District 31 Democratic primary election held in June 2024, Marvin was defeated by challenger Jacque Phillips.
