= InfiLaw System =

Consortium of for-profit law schools

The InfiLaw System
- Type: Private
- Industry: Educational services
- Founded: July 28, 2006, Wilmington, Delaware
- Headquarters: Naples, Florida, United States
- Area served: United States
- Website: www.infilaw.com

The InfiLaw System was a for-profit consortium of three independent law schools in the United States. It was owned by Sterling Partners, a Chicago-based private equity firm, and was headquartered in Naples, Florida. Charlotte School of Law in Charlotte, North Carolina and Arizona Summit Law School in Phoenix closed, the latter after losing ABA accreditation. InfiLaw relinquished its ownership of Florida Coastal School of Law in Jacksonville, Florida in April 2021, with that entity closing its doors after its Summer, 2021 term.

== History ==
=== Founding and initial growth ===
Sterling Partners purchased Florida Coastal School of Law in 2004 and founded the InfiLaw System in concurrence with the purchase. InfiLaw then established the Phoenix School of Law later in 2004 and the Charlotte School of Law in 2006. In November 2013, the Phoenix School of Law officially changed its name to "Arizona Summit School of Law." InfiLaw believed in inclusion in education and sought to reach the underserved. However, the Charlotte Law School Alumni Association condemned the consortium as "motivated first by profit and not the best interests of its students, faculty, and alumni." Both Arizona Summit Law School and Charlotte School of Law were awarded full ABA accreditation at the earliest time permitted by the ABA; Arizona Summit Law School in June, 2010, and Charlotte School of Law in June, 2011.

Enrollment at each of the three schools increased dramatically in the early years of InfiLaw ownership. For instance, Florida Coastal School of Law (the only previously established school in the InfiLaw System), increased from 904 students in 2004 to 1,741 students in 2010. The Arizona Summit School of Law had 336 students in 2008, which increased to around 700 by 2010 and necessitated a new, larger downtown Phoenix campus. Also, campus moves to downtown locations of both Arizona Summit Law School (Phoenix) and Charlotte School of Law (Charlotte) allowed students to be closer to the courts, the legal community and the government centers. The Charlotte School of Law's first class in 2007 received 1,010 applicants, of which around 420 were accepted. The initial 1L class size at the Charlotte school was only around 85 students. By 2009, the number for all three classes had grown to 481, and, in 2011, it increased again to 1,151.

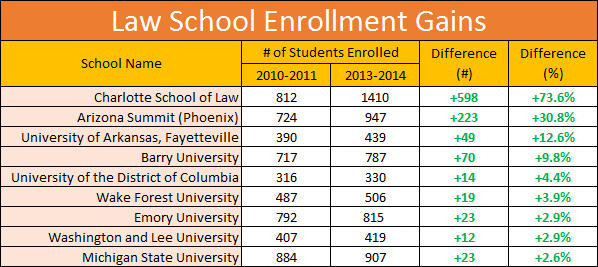
Despite a decrease in applicants, Charlotte and Florida Coastal increased enrollment between 2010 and 2013

As part of the law school reform movement that occurred in and around 2010 and 2011, the American Bar Association began amending its Section of Legal Education and Admissions to increase transparency at ABA-accredited schools. Among these reforms was the requirement that law schools provide more detailed and complete information about employment outcomes for graduates. This reform, along with an overall economic downturn during the same period, led to a decline in law school applications that also affected the schools in the InfiLaw System. From 2010 to 2014, law school applications dropped from 88,000 to 55,000 across ABA-accredited schools. InfiLaw's schools saw a similar decline in that time period from 12,754 applications in 2010 to 8,066 applications in 2013.

=== Attempted purchase of Charleston School of Law ===
In August 2013, two of the three owners of the for-profit Charleston School of Law announced they were selling the school to InfiLaw. Faculty, students, and alumni voiced objections to the sale citing concerns that InfiLaw would lower admissions standards to boost enrollment, resulting in lower bar passage and employment rates, which would, in turn, damage the school's reputation. Despite the opposition, others have pointed out that InfiLaw's schools have produced statistics similar to the Charleston School of Law in regard to tuition, loan default rates, employment outcomes, salaries, and passage of the bar. Two Charleston alumni wrote an op-ed in support of the sale of the school to InfiLaw, stating that InfiLaw gave the school a better chance to "thrive" and avoid struggles. In May 2014, however, a committee of the South Carolina Commission on Higher Education recommended in a 3-to-1 vote that the state's higher education regulator reject the sale.

In May 2015, InfiLaw spokeswoman, Kathy Heldman, said the company had no plans to refile an application for a license to operate in South Carolina with the state's Commission on Higher Education.

== Operation and statistics ==
=== Admissions selectivity ===
From the outset, InfiLaw has had a social mission of adding diversity to occupations that have an under representation of diverse professionals. The legal profession is one of the least diverse in America, with the American Bar Association (ABA) estimating that just over 12 percent of all lawyers are lawyers of color, in a nation that is 38 percent racially diverse.

In 2007, Florida Coastal School of Law was the only law school in the nation in which students from a minority group outperformed students in non-minority groups on the bar exam. InfiLaw also attracts individuals who do not have high enough LSAT scores and GPAs to be admitted into higher-tier law schools. InfiLaw officials and others have stated that the LSAT "is not the best determinant of success as a lawyer and clearly has racial bias." Each of the InfiLaw schools had been able to exceed enrollment of diverse students as confirmed by 2015 data. Diversity enrollment for Fall, 2015 was: Florida Coastal School of Law 52,4%; Charlotte School of Law 58.5% and Arizona Summit Law School 49.7%.

In 2015, PreLaw Magazine named Arizona Summit Law School to its Most Diverse Law School list. The magazine honored Summit Law with an A+ rating, and the school was named one of the top ten law schools for diversity nationwide among accredited law schools.

For students with lower LSAT scores, the InfiLaw schools offer students the ability to participate in a 7-week program called AAMPLE, (Alternative Admissions Model Program for Legal Education), that includes two actual law such/content courses and is designed to evaluate the student's ability to handle the rigors of the law school curriculum and achieve success in law school. This program has provided those students who typically have had difficulty with standardized testing the opportunity to prove themselves and to attend law school and earn a law degree. InfiLaw schools are said to provide more "hands-on learning" for individuals who score lower marks on their LSATs, offering around 400 hours of on-the-job training.

Florida Coastal School of Law was named a best law school for providing its students practical training by National Jurist Magazine. Coastal Law was listed in the top 20 law schools providing practical training and received a grade of A+, up from an A− in 2014.

InfiLaw has received criticism for their admissions standards (sometimes described as "lax"), with suggestions that these admissions standards could lead to fewer students passing the bar exam. By 2015, the predictions came true when only 30.6% of first time bar takers from Arizona Summit passed the July 2015 bar exam.

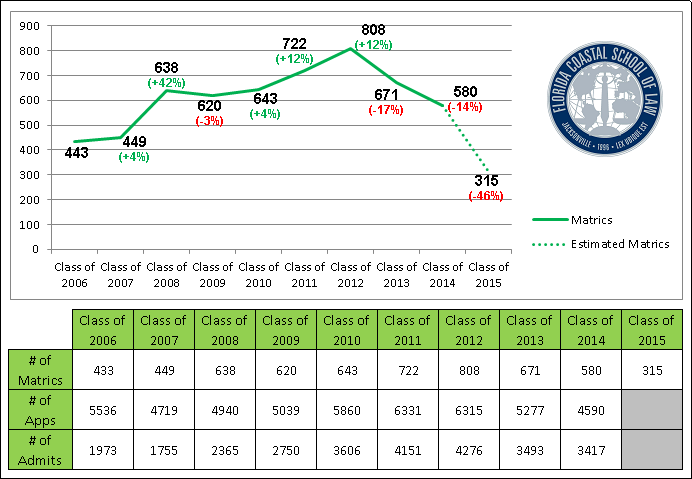
Florida Coastal has been criticized for lower selectivity since being acquired by InfiLaw

In 2010, the average LSAT score for all three InfiLaw schools was either 149 or 150, a mark generally considered average. By 2013, the median LSAT score at InfiLaw schools had dropped to 144 (23rd percentile), with 25% of its students achieving marks at or below 141. The median GPA for the class of 2016 at Florida Coastal School of Law is 2.97 and is 2.88 for Arizona Summit. At Charlotte, the median GPA is 2.91.

A 2012 report showed that 18% of first-year students at Arizona Summit had transferred to other law schools. This led to a policy in which transfer students were required to meet with an adviser before their transcripts would be released. In 2013, two professors filed a lawsuit against the school, alleging that they had been fired for objecting to a new policy related to student transfers, among other policy changes. InfiLaw disputes that claim, instead noting that the professors simply failed to execute letters of appointment proffered by the school for succeeding academic terms, before the expiration of their last term of employment. United States federal judge, Susan Bolton, dismissed the original complaint, but allowed the complaint to be amended in 2014. The amended complaint was subsequently dismissed by District Court, this time with prejudice. The District Court also ordered plaintiffs to pay most of the defendants' costs incurred to date in connection with the case. The plaintiffs appealed both the granting of the Motion to Dismiss and the Order to pay costs/fees to the US Court of Appeals for the Ninth Circuit.

=== Bar-passage rates ===
In the summer of 2013, each of the three schools in the InfiLaw system posted bar-passage rates of 58% or above. Charlotte achieved a 58% passage rate while Florida Coastal earned a 67.4% passage rate. A student from Arizona Summit posted the highest score on the Arizona bar exam in 2013. However, in 2015, Arizona Summit's bar passage rate fell to just 31% and its July 2016 Arizona bar passage rate for first time takers was an abysmal 24.6%. The school's total July 2016 Arizona bar passage rate was only 19.7%.

When InfiLaw first took over Florida Coastal, they improved their bar-passage rate from 58.2% to 76.4%. In February 2014, 73% of Florida Coastal students passed the bar but fewer students take the February bar. For graduates who took the exam in July, only 58% of Florida Coastal students passed, compared to a statewide average of 72%. For February, 2015 bar pass, Florida Coastal School of Law ranked third in the state among all state law schools at a passing rate of 74.5%, compared to 64.3% for all Florida law schools. However, in 2016, Coastal Law's bar passage rate fell to just 32.7%.

=== Employment outcomes ===
In 2012, a group of former Florida Coastal students filed a lawsuit against the law school, alleging that the school had inflated their post-graduate employment numbers in promotional material. The suit alleged that the school advertised an 80 to 95% employment rate for graduates in the first 9 months after receiving their diplomas. This case was part of a series of class action lawsuits filed by law school students and applicants across the country, a number of which have been dismissed. Casey et al. v. Florida Coastal, Judge Brian J. Davis of the United States District Court for the Middle District of Florida, Jacksonville Division, dismissed the entire case with prejudice, accepting United States Magistrate Judge Patricia D. Barksdale's recommendation of dismissal issued on August 15, 2015 . In a decision supplementing the reasoning of Magistrate Judge Barksdale, Judge Davis concluded that plaintiffs' allegations failed to state a claim and that the defendant's alleged conduct failed to rise to the level of deceptive or unfair trade practices, stating that claim of deceptive trade practice "requires proof that defendant's act would likely mislead the [objective] consumer acting reasonably in the circumstances."'

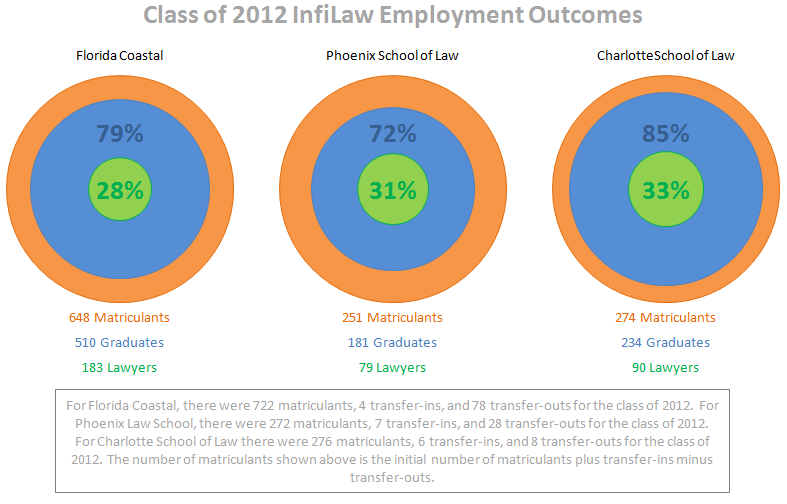
Outcomes for 2012 graduates of InfiLaw schools

Like all ABA-accredited law schools, Florida Coastal School of Law is required to survey members of its most recent graduating class to ascertain their employment status. In March of each year, law schools report this employment data to the American Bar Association and NALP, a non-profit education association for law schools and legal employers that also conducts an annual employment survey. The data collected reflect the employment status of each law school's graduates as of February 15. Florida Coastal School of Law was able to confirm the employment status of 98.4% (553 of 562) of its program completers who graduated September 1, 2012 through August 31, 2013. The job placement rate for these graduates was 62.1%. This figure was calculated using the NALP formula for calculating job placement rate. Therefore, the 62.1% job placement rate was calculated by adding together all of the employed graduates (349) and then dividing by the total number of graduates (562).

Tuition and costs at Charlotte School of Law initially started out at around $27,000 per student in 2007 with similar rates at the other two InfiLaw schools. By 2014, median tuition costs for all three InfiLaw schools were generally around $40,000. According to Harvard Law School, 97% of Arizona Summit's graduates have debt that averages around $162,000. 92% of Florida Coastal graduates incurred an average of $143,000 in debt, while 90% of Charlotte graduates incurred an average of $115,000 in debt.

== Closures ==
=== Charlotte School of Law ===
In November 2016, the ABA placed Charlotte School of Law on probation for violating ABA admissions standards. The next month, the Department of Education terminated it from the Federal Student Loan program. Charlotte graduates take on a median debt of $162,000. However, only 45.2% of graduates passed the North Carolina bar in July 2016. And only 26% of graduates from the class of 2015 obtained full-time, long term, bar passage required employment. The Charlotte School of Law announced their closing and ended their business operations in August 2017. More than 150 students and former students have filed lawsuits against Charlotte School of Law alleging fraud, violations of the North Carolina Deceptive Trade Practices Act, and other claims. The students claim that "money ruled, not education. And they left a lot of poor folks holding the bag." Faculty recently laid off by the school are also considering wrongful termination lawsuits.

=== Arizona Summit Law School ===
On March 27, 2016, the ABA notified Arizona Summit that the school was on probation for violating ABA academic and admission standards. The ABA's decision came after the school's bar passage rate dropped to 24.6%. Arizona Summit has announced plans to shut down as of Oct 26th, 2018. Plans to maintain its ABA accreditation till May 2020 when the last 22 students graduate and take the Bar Exam, after which, it will officially shutter its doors.

=== Florida Coastal School of Law ===
On May 15, 2020, the council of the American Bar Association's Section of Legal Education and Admissions to the Bar met remotely and determined Florida Coastal and nine other schools had significant noncompliance with Standard 316. This Standard was revised in 2019 to provide that at least 75% of an accredited law school's graduates who took a bar exam must pass one within two years of graduation. But in August 2020, Florida Coastal was able to demonstrate compliance, asserting that 75% of its 2018 graduates had passed a bar exam, and the 2019 cohort was on track for similarly qualifying results.

However, a new problem arose in Spring 2021 when the U.S. Department of Education terminated the school's access to federal student financial aid, and the school was directed to file a teach-out plan with the ABA's Section of Legal Education and Admissions to the Bar. The plan submitted in April was rejected by an executive committee of that ABA section as lacking several required items and not providing sufficient detail as to other items. A revised plan was to be considered in May, but no acceptable plan had been submitted by mid-May.

The school resubmitted its DOE application for Title IV eligibility. The U.S. Department of Education on May 13, 2021, rejected the request. Richard Cordray, the DOE's federal student aid chief operating officer, said in the press release that the school was acting recklessly and irresponsibly, putting its students at risk. The release also said regarding InfiLaw, “Last month, the private equity firm that had owned 98.6% of the institution relinquished its ownership. This move demonstrated its unwillingness to assume any potential liabilities related to noncompliance rather than using its resources to support the school’s continued participation in the federal student financial aid programs.” As a result, Florida Coastal said it was looking at its options.

A teach-out plan was finally approved in June, 2021, with the school to offer no further classes after the end of the Summer, 2021 term. Some students will transfer to other law schools, while others will attend classes elsewhere but graduate with Florida Coastal degrees. The school's accreditation will be continued until July 1, 2023, for the limited purpose of allowing currently-enrolled students to receive course credits at other accredited law schools.

== See also ==
- List of defunct law schools in the United States
