= Jesus Bernal =

American judge (born 1963)

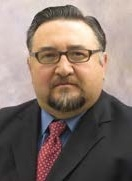

Judge of the United States District Court for the Central District of California
- Incumbent
- Assumed office December 12, 2012
- Appointed by: Barack Obama
- Preceded by: Stephen G. Larson

Personal details
- Born: Jesus Gilberto Bernal; November 1963 (age 62) Culiacán, Mexico
- Education: Yale University (BA); Stanford University (JD)

Jesus Gilberto Bernal (born November 1963) is a United States district judge of the United States District Court for the Central District of California.

== Biography ==
Bernal received his Bachelor of Arts degree, cum laude, from Yale University in 1986. He received his Juris Doctor from Stanford Law School in 1989. He served as a law clerk to Judge David Vreeland Kenyon of the United States District Court for the Central District of California from 1989 to 1991. He worked as a litigation associate at the law firm of Heller, Ehrman, White & McAuliffe LLP in Los Angeles from 1991 to 1996, where he focused on complex civil litigation. From 1996 to 2012, he was a deputy federal public defender in the Central District of California, serving at the Los Angeles office from 1996 to 2006 and serving as a directing attorney at the Riverside office from 2006 to 2012.

=== Federal judicial service ===
On April 25, 2012, President Barack Obama nominated Bernal to be a United States district judge for the United States District Court for the Central District of California, to the seat vacated by Judge Stephen G. Larson. The Senate Judiciary Committee held a hearing on his nomination on June 6, 2012, and reported his nomination to the floor on July 12, 2012. The Senate confirmed Bernal in a voice vote on December 11, 2012. He received his judicial commission on December 12, 2012.

== See also ==
- List of Hispanic and Latino American jurists

Legal offices
Preceded by Stephen G. Larson	Judge of the United States District Court for the Central District of California; 2012–present	Incumbent
