= Robert Timlin =

American judge

Robert James Timlin
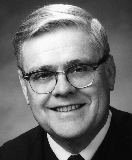

Senior Judge of the United States District Court for the Central District of California
- In office February 1, 2005 – January 17, 2017

Judge of the United States District Court for the Central District of California
- In office September 15, 1994 – February 1, 2005
- Appointed by: Bill Clinton
- Preceded by: Seat established by 104 Stat. 5089
- Succeeded by: Stephen G. Larson

Magistrate Judge of the United States District Court for the Central District of California
- In office 1971–1975

Personal details
- Born: Robert James Timlin; July 26, 1932 Buffalo, New York, U.S.
- Died: January 17, 2017 (aged 84) Santa Barbara, California, U.S.
- Education: Georgetown University (AB, JD, LLM)

Robert James Timlin (July 26, 1932 – January 17, 2017) was a United States district judge of the United States District Court for the Central District of California.

== Education ==
Timlin earned his Artium Baccalaureus degree from Georgetown University in 1954, his Juris Doctor from Georgetown University Law Center in 1959, and his Master of Laws from Georgetown University Law Center in 1964.

== Career ==
Timlin was in the United States Army as a Private, First Class from 1955 to 1957. He was later a law clerk and attorney for the Pennsylvania Railroad Company from 1959 to 1960 and entered private practive from 1960 to 1961. Timlin then became a Trial Attorney at the Criminal Division of the United States Department of Justice from 1961 to 1964.

From 1964 to 1966, Timlin served as Assistant United States Attorney of the Central District of California. On leaving that role, he was in private practice for one year until he became the City Attorney of Corona, California, a position he held from 1967 to 1970.

In 1970, Timlin was a teacher at Chaffey Union Jr. College in California. He reentered private practice in California from 1971 to 1976. Timlin then served as a judge in the Municipal Court, Corona Judicial District from 1976 to 1980. From 1980 to 1990 He was a judge in the Riverside County Superior Court. He was then appointed as an Associate Justice of the 4th District Court of Appeal in California by Governor George Deukmejian, a role he served in from 1990 to 1994.

== Federal judicial service ==
Timlin was nominated by President of the United States Bill Clinton on April 26, 1994, to a new seat created by 104 Stat. 5089. He was confirmed by the United States Senate on September 14, 1994, and received his commission on September 15, 1994. Timlin assumed senior status on February 1, 2005, and remained in that status until his death on January 17, 2017.

== Published works ==
- "Pitchess Motions Revisited", California Judicial Education and Research Journal, Spring, 1981
- Water Softeners Discharge, National Institute of Municipal Law Officers, January, 1973

== Notable cases ==
- Buono v. Norton, 212 F. Supp. 2d 1202 (C.D. Cal. 2002), aff'd 371 F.3d 543 (9th Cir. 2004), on remand 364 F. Supp. 2d 1175 (C.D. Cal. 2005), aff'd sub nom. Buono v. Kempthorne, 527 F.3d 758 (9th Cir. 2008), cert. granted sub nom. Salazar v. Buono, 129 S. Ct. 1313 (U.S. 2009)

Legal offices
Preceded by Seat established by 104 Stat. 5089	Judge of the United States District Court for the Central District of California; 1994–2005	Succeeded by Stephen G. Larson
