= Colorado's 31st House of Representatives district =

American legislative district

Colorado's 31st State House of Representatives district
Representative
Jacqueline Phillips; D–Thornton
- Demographics: 40% White; 2% Black; 49% Hispanic; 4% Asian; 0% Native American; 4% Multiracial
- Population (2024): 85,934

Colorado's 31st House of Representatives district is one of 65 districts in the Colorado House of Representatives. It has been represented by Jacqueline Phillips since 2025.

== Members ==
- Julia Marvin
- Jacqueline Phillips
- Gabriel Cervantes
