= Jacqueline Phillips =

American lawyer and politician

Member of the Colorado House of Representatives from the 31st district
- Incumbent
- Assumed office January 8, 2025
- Preceded by: Julia Marvin
- Succeeded by: Gabriel Cervantes (elect)

Personal details
- Party: Democratic
- Education: Aims Community College; University of Northern Colorado; University of Denver

Jacqueline Phillips is an American lawyer and politician. She is a Democratic member of the Colorado House of Representatives, representing District 31 since 2025. Phillips previously served on the Thornton City Council and has focused her career on issues such as affordable housing, education, and healthcare access.

== Education ==
Phillips earned an associate degree from Aims Community College, followed by a doctorate from the University of Northern Colorado. She earned a J.D. from the University of Denver's Sturm College of Law.

== Career ==
Phillips is a lawyer who has worked on housing affordability, healthcare access, and economic policy issues. She previously served as a member of the Thornton City Council. In 2024, Phillips defeated incumbent representative Julia Marvin in the Democratic primary for Colorado House District 31 with 55% of the vote. District 31 includes western Adams County and a portion of Thornton.

During her campaign, Phillips prioritized affordable housing, particularly for seniors, and proposed pathways to homeownership. She also focused on education policies, including promoting apprenticeships and vocational training, and environmental issues like water contamination and carbon reduction strategies.

Phillips ran against Republican Heidi Pitchforth in the 2024 Colorado House of Representatives election. By January 2025, she was serving as the representative for District 31 in the Colorado House of Representatives. She was assigned to the Education Committee and the Transportation, Housing & Local Government Committee during the 2025 legislative session.

Phillips has sponsored bills such as HB25-1075, addressing the regulation of speech–language pathology assistants, and HB25-1028, concerning modifications to the address confidentiality program.

=== 2026 election ===
Phillips ran for re-election in 2026. However, in the Democratic primary election held on June 30, 2026, she was defeated by community organizer Gabriel Cervantes.

== Personal life ==
Phillips resides in Thornton, Colorado.

Colorado House of Representatives
Preceded by Julia Marvin	Member of the Colorado House of Representatives from the 31st district 2025–present	Incumbent
