= Gabriel Cervantes =

American politician

Member-elect of the Colorado House of Representatives from the 31st district
- Assuming office January 2027
- Succeeding: Jacqueline Phillips

Personal details
- Party: Democratic
- Website: www.gabrielforcolorado.com

Gabriel Cervantes is an American politician. A member of the Democratic Party, he is the member-elect for the 31st district of the Colorado House of Representatives. He was endorsed by Senator Bernie Sanders. He supports term limits.
