= American Heritage University of Southern California =

For-profit college based in Southern California

- Motto: Knowledge Is Power
- Established: 2003
- School type: Unaccredited for-profit college
- Dean: Tony B. E. Ogiamien (President)
- Location: Ontario, CA, US; 34°04′14″N 117°36′50″W
- Enrollment: 330
- Faculty: 23 (full time and adjunct)
- Bar pass rate: 33% (1/3) (July 2013 1st time takers)
- Website: American Heritage University

American Heritage University of Southern California (AHUSC) is an unaccredited for-profit college based in Southern California.

American Heritage University states that it was founded in 2003 and is incorporated in the State of California under the name Heritage University.

== Degree Programs ==
The university is structured into two schools: the School of Business Management and the School of Law. The following degree programs are offered:

The School of Business Management has two (2) programs:

- Bachelor of Business Administration (BBA).
- Master of Business Administration (MBA)

The School of Law has two (2) programs:

- Bachelor of Science in Law (BSL).
- Juris Doctor (JD)

Its student pool consists largely of working adults. The school is located in Ontario, California, where local students may attend classes on weekends at the school campus for in-class sessions. They also have online live interactive lectures and archived recorded lectures.

AHUSC has an open enrollment admission policy. It confers degrees, certificates, and diplomas in a range of courses in business management and law. Though the school requires a minimum of 60 credit units to be admitted to its programs, it provides degree applicants with the opportunity for advanced placement through Experiential Learning Assessment. It is approved by the California Bureau for Private Postsecondary Education to offer bachelor's degrees in film studies, business administration, and law; master's degrees in public policy and business administration; law degrees (J.D.); and a doctor of business administration degree. This is not the same as accreditation, as the Bureau is not an accrediting organization.

=== Law Program ===
American Heritage law school graduates are eligible to receive a Juris Doctor (J.D.) law degree. The distance-learning law program of American Heritage is not approved by the American Bar Association or accredited by the California Committee of Bar Examiners. American Heritage is registered with the State Bar of California Committee of Bar Examiners (CBE) as a distance-learning law school. Accordingly, after their first year of law studies, law students from American Heritage are required to pass the California First-Year Law Students Examination ("baby bar") in order to proceed to the more advanced law courses. Upon passing the baby bar and graduation from the JD program, American Heritage University students are eligible to take the California General Bar Examination and, upon passing, can practice law in California.

In August 2022, the Committee of Bar Examiners advised American Heritage University School of Law that it intended to place the law school on probation or withdraw its accreditation because it was not in compliance or not likely to be in compliance with the rules and guidelines for unaccredited law schools. The law school requested a hearing regarding this finding, which will take place before the full Committee on December 3, 2022. In February 2023, the law school withdrew its registration.

==== FYLSE (baby bar) general passage rates ====
Between June 2011 and October 2015, 45 American Heritage University law students had taken the California First-Year Law Students' Examination (FYLSE) ("baby bar"), with 10 students passing — a passage rate of 22.22 percent.

From February 2013 through the October 2015 FYLSE, after passing the baby bar, 22 American Heritage University law students had taken the California General Bar Examination, with nine students passing — a passage rate of 41 percent.

== See also ==
- List of colleges and universities in California
- List of defunct law schools in the United States
