= Said Sharbini =

American politician

Member of the Colorado House of Representatives from the 31st district
- In office January 9, 2023 – December 31, 2023
- Preceded by: Yadira Caraveo
- Succeeded by: Julia Marvin

Personal details
- Party: Democratic
- Education: Associate of Arts, Bachelor of Arts in criminology, Juris Doctor
- Alma mater: Florida Coastal School of Law, Gulf Coast State College, Florida State University
- Profession: Lawyer

Said Sharbini is an American attorney and politician who served as a member of the Colorado House of Representatives for the 31st district. A Democrat, he took office in January 2023 and resigned effective December 31, 2023.

== Colorado House of Representatives ==
He was elected on November 8, 2022, in the 2022 Colorado House of Representatives election against Republican opponent Heidi Pitchforth. He assumed office on January 9, 2023.

2022 Colorado House of Representatives election, District 31
Party	Candidate	Votes	%
Democratic	Said Sharbini	13,461	58.6
Republican	Heidi Pitchforth	9,517	41.4
Total		22,978	100.0

In 2023, Sharbini, alongside other legislators, signed a letter calling for a ceasefire in the Gaza war.

On December 18, 2023, Sharbini announced he would resign as a state representative effective December 31, 2023. He said his resignation was motivated by the position's low pay, long hours, and the polarized and contentious climate in the state house.

== Biography ==
Sharbini earned an Associate of Arts from Gulf Coast State College in 2006, a Bachelor of Arts in criminology from Florida State University in 2008, and a Juris Doctor from Florida Coastal School of Law in 2012. Sharbini’s father is Palestinian and hails from Nazareth, where many of his family still live.

Colorado House of Representatives
Preceded by Yadira Caraveo	Member of the Colorado House of Representatives from the 31st district 2023–2023	Succeeded by Julia Marvin
