= List of defunct law schools in the United States =

This page includes law schools in the United States that have closed. Nearly half of the for-profit law schools in the United States operating in 2013 have since closed.

== Defunct law schools in the United States ==
State (city)	School	Year founded	Year closed
Arizona (Phoenix)	Arizona Summit Law School, InfiLaw System	2005	2019
California (Anaheim)	American College of Law	1971	2012/13
California (Bakersfield)	California Pacific University School of Law	1986	2002
California (Carlsbad)	California Midland School of Law	2006	2012/13
California (Cerritos)	Irvine College of Law	1993	2024
California (Costa Mesa)	Whittier Law School	1966	2019
California (Glendale)	Glendale University College of Law	1967	2024
California (Inglewood)	Northrop University	1942 (parent university)	2001
California (Irvine)	California Southern University (correspondence)	1978	2022
California (Long Beach)	Pacific Coast University School of Law	1927	2026
California (Los Angeles)	MD Kirk School of Law (correspondence)	2005	2012/13
California (Los Angeles)	People's College of Law	1974	2024
California (Orange)	Pacific West College of Law	1993	2024
California (Riverside)	California Southern Law School	1971	2020
California (San Bernardino)	American Heritage University School of Law (distance-learning)	2003	2024
California (San Diego)	National University School of Law	1971 (parent university)	2001
California (San Diego)	Western Sierra Law School	1979	2025
California (San Francisco)	New College of California School of Law	1971	2008
California (San Luis Obispo)	University of San Luis Obispo School of Law	1993	2015
California (Sacramento)	Lorenzo Patiño School of Law, University of Northern California	1983	2013
California (Santa Rosa)	Empire College School of Law	1972	2024
California (Upland)	Inland Valley University College of Law	2003	2012/13
Connecticut (Hartford)	Hartford College of Law	1921	1948
Connecticut (Litchfield)	Litchfield Law School	1784	1833
District of Columbia (Washington, D.C.)	Antioch School of Law	1972	1986
District of Columbia (Washington, D.C.)	Robert H. Terrell Law School	1931	1950
Florida (Jacksonville)	Florida Coastal School of Law, InfiLaw System	1996	2021
Georgia (Atlanta)	Atlanta Law School	1890	1994
Georgia (Atlanta)	Woodrow Wilson College of Law	1929	1987
Georgia (Augusta)	Augusta Law School	1833	1854
Georgia (Augusta)	Augusta Law School	1947	1980s
Georgia (Savannah)	Savannah Law School	2011	2021
Illinois (Chicago)	La Salle Extension University	1909	1980
Illinois (Springfield)	Lincoln College of Law	1911	1953
Illinois (Bloomington)	Illinois Wesleyan University Law School	1874	1927
Idaho (Boise)	Concordia University School of Law	2012	2020
Indiana (Fort Wayne)	Indiana Tech Law School	2012	2017
Indiana (Valparaiso)	Valparaiso University School of Law	1879	2020
Kentucky (Paducah)	Alben W. Barkley School of Law	2005	2008
Massachusetts (Dartmouth)	Southern New England School of Law	1981	2010
Massachusetts (Northampton)	Northampton Law School	1823	1829
Minnesota (St. Paul)	Hamline University School of Law	1972	2015
Minnesota (St. Paul)	William Mitchell College of Law	1956	2015
Missouri (St. Louis)	Lincoln University School of Law	1939	1955
New Jersey (Princeton)	Princeton Law School	1847	1852
New York (Ballston Spa)	State and National Law School	1849	1865
New York (Clinton)	Maynard-Knox Law School, Hamilton College	1857	1887
North Carolina (Buncombe County)	Bailey Law School	1859	1877
North Carolina (Charlotte)	Charlotte School of Law InfiLaw System	2006	2017
North Carolina (Greensboro)	Greensboro Law School	1878	1893
North Carolina (Richmond Hill)	Richmond Hill Law School	1848	1878
Ohio (Cleveland)	Lake Erie Law School	1915	1933
Oklahoma (Tulsa)	O. W. Coburn School of Law	1979	1985
Pennsylvania (Easton)	Union Law School	1846	
Puerto Rico (Mayagüez)	Eugenio María de Hostos School of Law, Universidad de Puerto Rico	1995	2013
Tennessee (Chattanooga)	Chattanooga College of Law	1898	1960
Tennessee (Davidson County)	unnamed law school founded by John Haywood	1802	1826
Texas (Dallas)	Jefferson Law School	1919	1937
Virginia (Staunton)	Staunton Law School	1831	1849
Virginia (Winchester)	Winchester Law School	1824	1831
Wisconsin (Milwaukee)	Milwaukee Law School	1892	1908

== See also ==
- List of law schools in the United States
