= Western Sierra Law School =

Law school in Oceanside, California, United States

Coordinates: 32°48′36″N 117°08′36″W

- Established: 1979 (closed 2025)
- School type: Private
- Location: Oceanside, California, CA, US
- Bar pass rate: 50% (October 2020 1st time takers) and 33% (October 2020 repeat takers)

Western Sierra Law School (WSLS) was a private law school in Oceanside, California. The school was founded in 1979 and closed in 2025. It offered an affordable and accessible option to those looking to study the law, earn a Juris Doctor (J.D.) degree and qualify to sit for the California Bar Exam.

Western Sierra Law School offered a part-time, evening, 4 year J.D. program that was designed to accommodate working professionals. Students attended classes 2-3 nights per week, 3–4 hours per night, typically beginning at 6:30pm. The first year consisted of a comprehensive study of Contracts, Torts, and Criminal Law, after which the student was qualified to sit for the First-Year Law Students' Exam (FYLSE) also known as the Baby Bar administered by the State Bar of California. Students had pass the FYLSE within three administrations, or otherwise be exempt, to receive credit for all law study completed to date. While concurrently working to pass the FYLSE, and after passing, students continued their study in years 2, 3, and 4 of all subjects tested on the CA Bar Exam and electives/clinical education to explore areas of interest. Western Sierra Law School had small class sizes averaging 10 students to 1 faculty member.

== Admissions ==
Western Sierra Law School had an open admissions policy, meaning that any applicant who satisfied the pre-legal education requirements of two years of college, appeared to have a good moral character, and had a passion to study the law could be admitted to the JD program.

== State Bar of California Registration ==
Western Sierra Law School was registered with the State Bar of California, Committee of Bar Examiners as an unaccredited fixed-facility law school and was authorized by the CBE to confer a Juris Doctor degree on all graduates of its JD Program.

Upon passing the California Bar Exam and meeting all the admission requirements of the State Bar of California, the successful student may become licensed to practice law in California.

=== First-Year Law Students' Examination (Baby Bar) ===
Students who were enrolled in Western Sierra Law School's J.D. Program had to pass the First-Year Law Students' Examination (FYLSE) also known as the Baby Bar as part of the State Bar of California's requirements to qualify to take the California Bar Exam, unless exempt as a transfer student from an accredited law school. Students qualify to take the FYLSE after successfully completing their 1L year consisting of Contracts, Torts, Criminal Law.

== See also ==
- List of defunct law schools in the United States
