= Irving Schleimer =

American lawyer

Irving Schleimer (1921 – November 21, 2005) was Dean of Pacific Coast University School of Law in Long Beach, Los Angeles County, California, from 1981 to 1999.

He was a strong proponent of diversity in legal education.

Schleimer was raised in New York City, New York, the son of poor Jewish immigrants. Forced by economic necessity to drop out of school at an early age and go to work to support his family, he completed his General Educational Development (GED) in the United States Army Air Forces and served as a U.S. Army meteorologist during World War II, in the Aleutian Islands war zone. He later founded an orthodontic appliance business while attending Long Beach Community College at night, followed by night law school at Pacific Coast University School of Law ("PCU"), then practiced law in Long Beach. After retiring from practicing law, he was hired as an instructor at PCU, leading to his deanship. Schleimer did not draw a salary from the non-profit law school for several years before his retirement in 1999 because he wanted to keep the school's tuition the lowest in the United States.

He died on November 21, 2005, in Encinitas, California, after a long illness.
