= Laxmaiah Manchikanti =

Indian anesthesiologist

- Born: 10 July 1947 (age 79); Bodangparthy, Princely state of Hyderabad of British India now (Telangana, India)
- Spouse: Chandrakala Manchikanti
- Children: 3
- Medical career
- Profession: Physician
- Field: Anesthesiology, Interventional Pain Management, Pain Management Centers of America, Paducah, KY
- Institutions: University of Louisville School of Medicine

Laxmaiah Manchikanti (born 10 July 1947) is an Indian American physician and anesthesiologist specializing in interventional pain management, professor, philanthropist, and author. He is the founder of the American Society of Interventional Pain Physicians (ASIPP), the Society of Interventional Pain Management Surgery Centers (SIPMS) and the Pain Physician, a newspaper owned by his organization, Manchikanti has served as clinical professor of Anesthesiology and Perioperative Medicine at the University of Louisville School of Medicine. He has served as chairman of the board and chief executive officer of ASIPP since 1998. He has been medical director of the Pain Management Centers of Paducah, Kentucky and Marion, Illinois and the Ambulatory Surgery Center in Paducah, Kentucky since 1992. He co-founded a multistate national company, Pain Management Centers of America (PMCOA), in 2019 with Mahendra Sanapati, MD.

Dr, Manchikani was the owner of the private Alben W. Barkley School of Law when it closed in 2008.
