= Pain Practice =

- Discipline: Pain management
- Language: English
- Edited by: Christopher J. Gilligan

Publication details
- History: 2001-present
- Publisher: John Wiley & Sons on behalf of the World Institute of Pain
- Frequency: 8/year
- Impact factor: 2.183 (2013)

Standard abbreviations
- ISO 4: Pain Pract.

Indexing
- ISSN: 1530-7085 (print); 1533-2500 (web)
- LCCN: 00214928
- OCLC no.: 890297366

Links
- Journal homepage; Online access; Online archive

Pain Practice is a peer-reviewed medical journal published by John Wiley & Sons on behalf of the World Institute of Pain. According to the Journal Citation Reports, the journal has a 2013 impact factor of 2.183.
