= Penny Willrich =

U.S. lawyer, academic administrator, and judge

Dean of the Arizona Summit Law School
- Interim
- In office 2017–2018
- Preceded by: Shirley Mays

Judge of the Arizona Superior Court
- In office 1999–2005
- Appointed by: Jane Dee Hull

Personal details
- Born: Grand Prairie, Texas, U.S.
- Education: University of Texas at Arlington; Antioch School of Law; Capella University

Penny Ladell Willrich is an American lawyer, academic administrator, and judge who served as the interim dean of the Arizona Summit Law School from 2017 to 2018. In 1999, she became the first Black woman to serve as a judge on the Arizona Superior Court.

== Life ==
Willrich is from Grand Prairie, Texas. She is the daughter of civil rights advocates. Her father was a preacher. Willrich volunteered for local political campaigns during her youth and intended to become a teacher. Influenced by her activism, she decided to study law. Willrich earned a B.A. (1974) and M.A. (1977) in political science, B.A. (1976) in history, and a teaching certificate at the University of Texas at Arlington. She was its first female Black student body president. Willrich attended Texas Tech University School of Law from 1977 to 1979 before transferring to Antioch School of Law where she completed a J.D. in 1982.

From 1982 to 1987, Willrich worked for West Texas Community Legal Services in Fort Worth and practiced family law including divorce, custody, consumer action, and landlord and tenant disputes. In June 1987, she became the managing attorney and director of domestic violence of Community Legal Services in Phoenix, Arizona. From 1992 to 1994, Willrich was the assistant director of the administration of children, youth, and families division in the Arizona Department of Economic Security. She supported legislation for technological improvements which provided computers to child protective services social workers. From 1994 to 1995, she worked in private practice.

For five years, Willrich was a volunteer pro tem judge before serving as a commissioner. From 1995 to 1999, she was a commissioner in the juvenile and criminal division of the Arizona Superior Court in Maricopa County. In this role, she was appointed by the Arizona Supreme Court to develop the draft of the re-drafted juvenile court rules. Willrich served as a trial court judge in the juvenile, criminal, and family division from 1999 to 2005. She was the first Black woman judge on the Arizona Superior Court.

Willrich was an associate professor of law at the Phoenix School of Law. In April 2007, she was awarded the Maricopa County NAACP Roy Wilkins Award for service. In 2008, Willrich was elected to the board of Community Legal Services as its vice president. Later that same year, she completed a Ph.D., summa cum laude, in criminal justice, criminology, and public safety at Capella University and was inducted into Alpha Phi Sigma. On July 1, 2011, she was appointed as its associate dean of academic affairs, succeeding Shandrea Solomon. On January 1, 2017, Willrich became the interim dean of the Arizona Summit Law School, succeeding Shirley Mays.

== See also ==
- List of African-American jurists
