= Jacksonville Area Legal Aid =

- Headquarters: 126 W. Adams St. Jacksonville, Florida
- No. of attorneys: More than 30
- Major practice areas: Civil Defense for indigent clients.
- Key people: Jim Kowalski
- Date founded: Organized in the 1930s and legally named in 1973
- Company type: 501(c)(3)
- Website: www.jaxlegalaid.org

The Jacksonville Area Legal Aid, JALA, developed during the Great Depression and the recession of 1937 out of a group of attorneys who organized to provide pro bono legal services to those who could not afford the services. The Jacksonville Area Legal Aid was officially named in 1973, and received 501(c)(3) tax status in 1976. JALA is a mid-size law firm with over 50 lawyers and support staff who offer free legal services to low income clients in civil legal matters which include public benefits, employment/unemployment law, family law, landlord-tenant disputes, fair housing, guardianship, refugee and asylee immigration, foreclosure defense, and consumer law. JALA works with Florida Coastal School of Law and has supported accredited externships with the Florida State University.

== Funding and budget ==
JALA receives funding from the Florida Bar Foundation, which collects interest on lawyer trust accounts. Saint Johns County and Jacksonville also donate to JALA, although the Jacksonville City Council did not fund JALA "in 2013 or 2014, aside from dedicated grants for specific programs like veterans and homeless representation." In 2008 and 2009, JALA received $1.2 million from the bar foundation; however, due to a drop in interest rates JALA's budget was impacted in 2014 and only expected to receive $252,798 during the 2015 and 2016 fiscal years. The result of the 2014 budget reduction required JALA to lay off employees, cut its services to low-income clients, and close the office on some days.

== Pro bono assistance ==
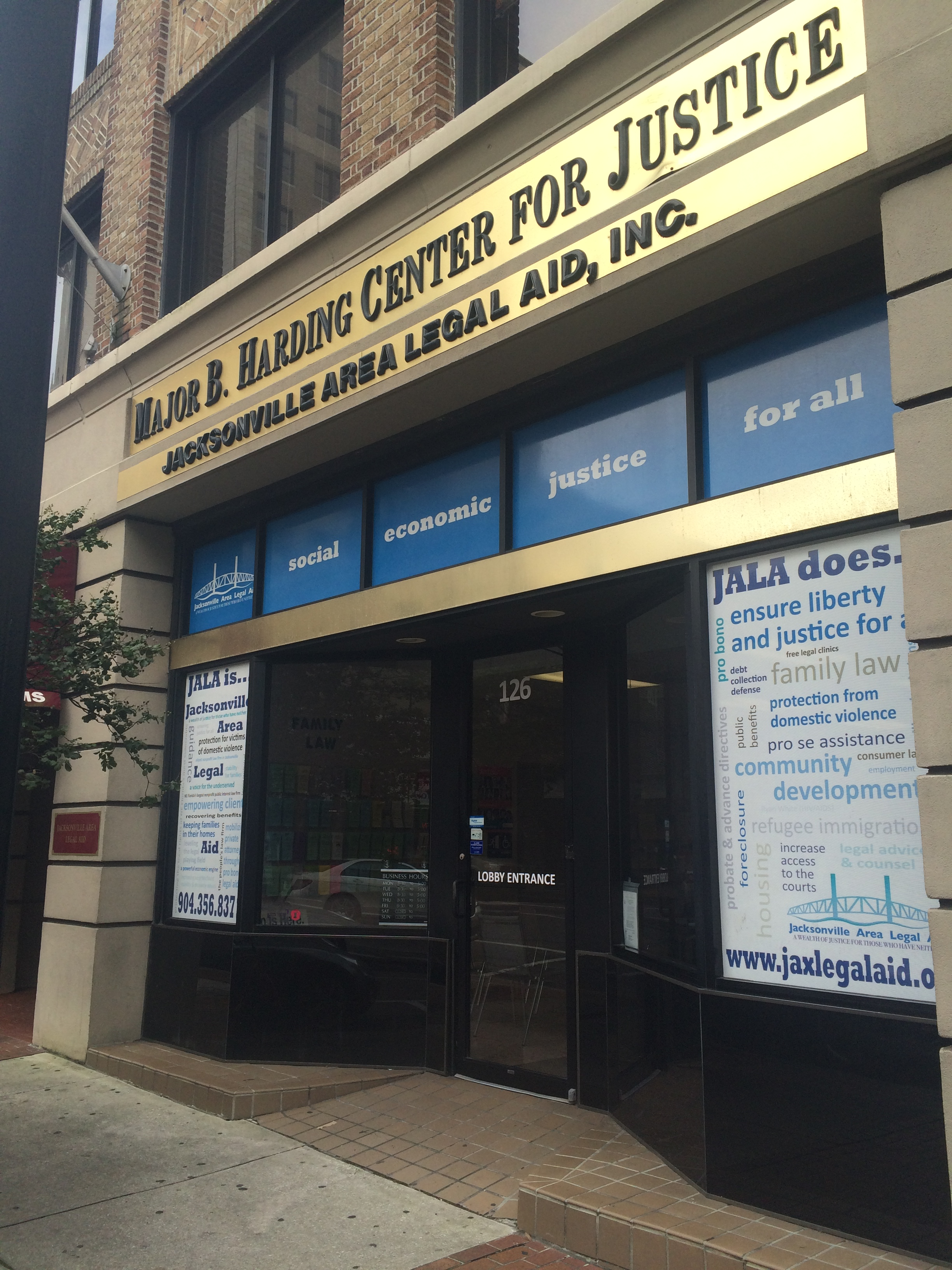
The Jacksonville Area Legal Aid

JALA offers free legal seminars and assistance to the public.

=== Civil rights ===
JALA is the Fair Housing Act enforcement agency for Northeast Florida.

=== Family law ===
Monthly family law seminars are given to assist families in dissolution of marriage, paternity/timeshare custody, and child support modification

=== Foreclosure and bankruptcy ===
JALA offers assistance to clients affected by foreclosure, and assist the City of Jacksonville in developing strategies related to foreclosed homes affected by the subprime mortgage crisis Additionally, JALA gives bankruptcy assistance by holding free legal seminars and offering pro bono defense to individuals in bankruptcy.

=== Immigration ===
JALA operates the Refugee Immigration Project, a legal project designed to give immigration assistance to asylum seekers, refugees, and victims of human trafficking

=== Mental health ===
JALA operates the Mental Health Advocacy Project, a program developed to help the mentally ill with the greatest financial needs gain access to treatment.

=== Northeast Florida Medical Legal Partnership ===
The Northeast Florida Medical Legal Partnership (NFMLP) is pro bono project of JALA that combines the knowledge of medical and legal professional to improve the health of low income and vulnerable patients.

== Three Rivers Legal Services ==
The Three Rivers Legal Services (Three Rivers) is a pro bono legal aid law firm headquartered in Gainesville, Florida and established in 1977. JALA collaborates with Three Rivers to offer legal services in the Northeast Florida region. JALA and Three Rivers work together in clinics to restore civil rights, expunge criminal records, and assist in bankruptcy cases.
