= California Southern Law School =

Private law school in Riverside, California

- Motto: A Great Value in Legal Education
- Established: 1971; Closed May 2020
- School type: Private law school
- Dean: Judge Elwood M. Rich (1920–2015; Dean, 1971–2014)
- Location: Riverside, California, US; 33°57′33″N 117°23′29″W
- USNWR ranking: No USNWR Ranking
- Website: Official website
- ABA profile: Non-ABA School

California Southern Law School (CSLS) was a private part-time evening law school in Riverside, California. It admitted its last entering class in Fall 2016 and closed after the Spring 2020 semester. It is registered with the California State Bar Committee of Bar Examiners (CBE), but is not approved by the CBE or accredited by the American Bar Association. As a registered law school, CSLS graduates may take the California Bar Examination and upon passing the Bar, they are authorized to practice law in California.

== History ==
California Southern Law School was founded in 1971 as Citrus Belt Law School (Note: California Southern Law School is the DBA for Citrus Belt Law School, a corporation registered with the California Secretary of State, number C0629839, filed July 23, 1971. It has filed a FBN with the County of Riverside, County Clerk, file number R-201104190, exp. 4/12/2016. It is licensed by the City of Riverside Finance Department, Account No. BL00007353. The Better Business Bureau (BBB) has given CSLS an A+ Reliability Rating as an Accredited Business since March 10, 1976.) by California Superior Court Judge Elwood M. Rich to serve students in the Inland Empire of Southern California. (Note: Judge Rich opened Citrus Belt Law School shortly after the private vocational Riverside University, which had a law program, was closed by state and federal regulators."Riverside University May Have To Close". The Press-Courier. Oxnard, California. June 10, 1971. p. 4.) It took its original name from the Citrus Belt League of the Inland Empire, but changed the name in 1990 to California Southern Law School.

=== California State Bar CBE registration ===
California Southern Law School is registered with the Committee of Bar Examiners of The State Bar of California (CBE), which authorizes CSLS to operate and to grant the Juris Doctor (J.D.) law degree. CSLS is not accredited by the American Bar Association or approved by the CBE. As a registered "unaccredited" law school, CSLS students must take and pass the First-Year Law Students' Examination (commonly referred to as the "Baby Bar") administered by the CBE. Upon successful passing of the "Baby Bar" those students may continue with their law studies to obtain their J.D. degree.

== Facilities ==
California Southern Law School maintained its facilities in stand-alone buildings in the Magnolia Center Neighborhood of Riverside, California. Facilities included offices, classrooms and a trial practice courtroom. Legal research and Writing classes are held at the Victor Miceli Riverside County Law Library in Downtown Riverside.

== Academics ==
=== Pre-legal education requirements ===
CSLS admitted students meeting the pre-legal education requirements set forth by the Committee of Bar Examiners and does not require the Law School Admission Test (LSAT). The CBE requires prospective law students to complete a minimum of two years of approved college work or its equivalent before entering law school. This requirement is generally met by receiving an Associate of Arts (AA) degree, Associate of Science (AS) degree or by having completed at least 60 semester (90 quarter) units of college work applicable to a Bachelor's degree at a regionally accredited or approved school recognized by the CBE, with an average grade at least equal to that required for graduation. As allowed by the CBE, prospective CSLS students could satisfy this requirement by taking certain College Level Examination Program (CLEP) tests. (Note: Students meet can CBE Pre-Legal Education requirements by obtaining a score of 50 in the following CLEP tests, offered by the College Board: Either the College Composition or the College Composition Modular examination; plus, Two/four other examinations (12 credits total) in: Composition and Literature (Humanities examination only); Foreign Languages; History and Social Science; Science and Mathematics; Business)

=== Law study ===
As required by the Committee of Bar Examiners, California Southern Law School offered a four-year law curriculum. The CSLS program covered all bar examination subjects likely to be tested by the CBE. All classes were held on weekday evenings which allowed students to pursue a legal education and maintain full-time employment.

== Notable alumnipeople ==
Notable alumni of California Southern Law School include:

- Michael A. Ramos (1988) – District attorney, County of San Bernardino (2002–2019) and Member, California Victim Compensation and Government Claims Board

== See also ==
- List of defunct law schools in the United States
