= Pacific Coast University =

Law school in Long Beach, California

Coordinates: 33°47′10″N 118°08′28″W

Pacific Coast University School of Law
- Established: 1927
- School type: Unaccredited private law school
- Location: Long Beach, California, United States
- Faculty: 11
- Bar pass rate: 14% (July 2019 1st time takers)
- Website: PCU Law School

Pacific Coast University School of Law (Pacific Coast University or PCU School of Law) was an unaccredited private law school in Long Beach, California.

It closed in June 2026.

== Accreditation ==
The PCU School of Law was accredited by the Committee of Bar Examiners of the State Bar of California from 2010 until its termination on August 20, 2020, due to non-compliance with the minimum California Bar pass rate.

As a result, although PCU graduates were able to sit for the California Bar Exam during accreditation (and now if they first pass the First-Year Law Students' Examination), they are generally ineligible to practice law in other states.

== See also ==
- List of defunct law schools in the United States
