= University of Northern California, Lorenzo Patiño School of Law =

Private law school in Sacramento, California

University of Northern California Lorenzo Patiño School of Law
- Motto: Excellence and Affordability in Legal Education
- Established: 1983
- School type: Private law school
- Location: Sacramento, CA, US; 38°34′47″N 121°29′34″W
- Bar pass rate: 0% (0/3) (July 2011 1st time takers)

The University of Northern California, Lorenzo Patiño School of Law (UNC) was a private law school located in Sacramento, California. UNC offered a part-time, four-year law program as well as a paralegal program. Law school registration was terminated during the June 28–29, 2013 meeting of the State Bar. As of June 30, 2013, UNC was no longer listed as a law school by the State Bar of California Committee of Bar Examiners and the University of Northern California's website removed the listing of the Juris Doctor as one of its academic programs.

== History ==
The law school was founded in 1983 as the University of Northern California. After the untimely death of Lorenzo Patiño, it was renamed in his honor. The school held its first classes in the spring of 1983. One hundred and eighty seven students enrolled the first year.

== Authorization to operate ==
The law school did not have professional accreditation from either the American Bar Association Office of the Consultant on Legal Education or the State Bar of California Committee of Bar Examiners.

As an unaccredited educational institution, the UNC had to be authorized to operate by the California Bureau for Private Postsecondary Education. It was approved to confer the Juris Doctor degree and a certificate in paralegal studies. It was registered as an unaccredited law school with the State Bar of California Committee of Bar Examiners.

Because it was not accredited, UNC law students had to take and pass the First-year Law Students' Examination, informally called the "Baby Bar", at the end of their first year to receive credit for their legal study and as one of the qualifications to sit the California Bar Examination after taking the degree.

At its June 2013 meeting, the State Bar of California terminated the school's registration as an unaccredited, fixed-facility and degree granting authority, effective as of June 30, 2013.

== Bar pass rates ==
From 1997 through February 2011, 134 Lorenzo Patiño graduates took the California Bar Examination as first-time takers; of that number, 12 passed the examination for a 9% pass rate.

== See also ==
- List of defunct law schools in the United States
