= Proposition 34 =

Proposition 34 may refer to:

- 2012 California Proposition 34
- 2024 California Proposition 34
