= Charlotte School of Law =

For-profit law school in North Carolina, US

Coordinates: 35.2249°N 80.8433°W

- Type: For-profit law school
- Active: 2006–2017
- Location: Charlotte, North Carolina, US
- Campus: Urban
- Website: www.charlottelaw.edu

Charlotte School of Law (Charlotte Law) was a private for-profit law school in Charlotte, North Carolina, established in 2006. It was provisionally accredited by the American Bar Association (ABA) in 2008, and fully accredited in 2011. However, the ABA placed the school on probation in 2016, resulting in the school's closure the following year. Charlotte Law was owned by the InfiLaw System.

== History ==
Charlotte Law was established in 2006 and initially accredited two years later.

=== Compliance issues ===
In November 2016, Charlotte School of Law was placed on probation by the ABA, which cited compliance issues tied to the school's admission policies and practices, including admitting applicants "who do not appear capable of satisfactorily completing its educational program and being admitted to the bar". On December 19, 2016, Charlotte School of Law lost its authority from the U.S. Department of Education to participate in the Federal Student Loan program.

In January 2017, the school offered students emergency $1,000 loans.

On February 7, 2017, the Charlotte School of Law Alumni Association wrote to Dean Jay Conison and President Chidi Ogene demanding their resignations. The Alumni Association noted the falling admission standards, decreasing bar passage rates, and dismal employment prospects for graduates under Conison and Ogene's leadership. In addition, the Alumni Association decried what they deemed the misrepresentations and mismanagement of the administration "motivated first by profit and not the best interests of its students, faculty, and alumni."

In January 2017, more than 150 students and former students filed lawsuits against Charlotte School of Law alleging fraud, violations of the North Carolina Deceptive Trade Practices Act, and other claims.

=== Closure ===
Beginning on June 21, 2017, the school operated on a restricted license. The required contingencies were not met, and the school's license expired on August 10, 2017. On August 15, 2017, the New York Times reported that the North Carolina attorney general had confirmed that Charlotte School of Law had closed. Students and alumni were first notified of the closure by the President of the Alumni Association rather than the school's administration.

Since its closure, the school and the circumstances surrounding its operation and loss of accreditation have been the subject of extensive litigation. A class action was instituted against the school by former students, resulting in a controversial $2.65 million settlement for as many as 2,500 former students. More than 70 students objected to the settlement amount. A second suit has been instituted in Illinois against Sterling Partners, the Hedge Fund that owns InfiLaw. In turn, the school has filed suit against the ABA, arguing that the ABA's decision to revoke its accreditation was made improperly and violated its right to Due Process.

== Campus ==
Charlotte School of Law was located at 201 South College Street in Uptown Charlotte. The building contained classrooms, the school's law library, an appellate courtroom, offices, and the school bookstore.

== Academics ==
Charlotte Law School admitted 64% of applicants during the 2015–2016 application cycle. The Fall 2016 entering class had a median GPA of 2.80 and a median LSAT score of 144 (22nd percentile of LSAT takers). During the 2015–2016 academic year, 130 first year students (36% of the class) failed out of Charlotte Law School.

Charlotte School of Law offered conditional scholarships to certain incoming students. The scholarships required students to maintain a specific GPA rather than remain in good standing. Courses at Charlotte were graded on a curve with a low median GPA. Because conditional scholarship students were placed together in courses with strict grade curves, there was a risk that a large percentage of students would fail to maintain the required GPA to keep their scholarships. As a result, scholarship students lost their scholarships and were required to pay tuition to the school in subsequent semesters to continue their studies, allowing the school to increase revenues. During the 2015–2016 academic year, 155 out of 264 (59%) Charlotte School of Law scholarship students had their conditional scholarships reduced or eliminated.

In January 2017, the school laid off numerous faculty and staff because the federal government had terminated the school's participation in the federal student loan program.

== Bar examination passage ==
While 84.3% of Charlotte School of Law graduates passed the bar exam in 2010, which was the second highest rate out of the seven law schools in North Carolina at the time, only 45.2% of those taking the bar exam for the first time passed the July 2016 North Carolina bar exam. Charlotte graduates performed 20% worse than the North Carolina state average. Since 2010, Charlotte Law School's July bar passage rate decreased every year. The declining bar passage rate coincided with the school's drop in admission standards to maintain enrollment. In an attempt to bolster the bar passage rate and protect the school's accreditation, the school began paying students in 2014 to delay taking the bar exam.

On January 24, 2017, a secret recording was released of a Charlotte School of Law faculty meeting. Assistant Dean Odessa Alm pushed faculty present at the meeting to advise students to forgo taking the bar exam in exchange for payments of $11,200 from the school. Dean Alm told the faculty, "[y]ou know if we didn't have the extended program last time...our pass rate would have been 20-something percent....didn't you feel so f***ing bad when we had 42 percent pass the bar."

== Charlotte Law Review ==
The Charlotte Law Review, a student-edited scholarly legal journal, published two issues yearly, a Spring and a Fall Journal, with plans of publishing its first Symposium Edition. The Law Review accepted manuscripts for consideration from sources both within and outside the Charlotte Law School community.

== Employment ==
According to Charlotte's official 2015 ABA-required disclosures, 26% of the Class of 2015 obtained full-time, long-term, bar passage required employment nine months after graduation. 24% of graduates were unemployed 9 months after graduation. 2% of graduates worked in non-professional jobs. 34% of graduates were employed in short term or part-time jobs. Charlotte's Law School Transparency under-employment score was 37.7%, indicating the percentage of the Class of 2013 unemployed, pursuing an additional degree, or working in a non-professional, short-term, or part-time job nine months after graduation.

ABA Employment Summary for 2015 Graduates
Employment Status	Percentage
Employed - Bar Passage Required (Full-Time, Long-Term)	26.52%
Employed - Bar Passage Required (Part-Time and/or Short-Term)	4.82%
Employed - J.D. Advantage	26.75%
Employed - Professional Position	11.84%
Employed - Non-Professional Position	2.19%
Employed - Law School/University Funded	1.54%
Employed - Undeterminable	0.0%
Pursuing Graduate Degree Full Time	1.54%
Unemployed - Start Date Deferred	0.44%
Unemployed - Not Seeking	1.54%
Unemployed - Seeking	22.37%
Employment Status Unknown	0.65%
Total of 456 Graduates

== Costs ==
The total cost of attendance (indicating the cost of tuition, fees, and living expenses) at Charlotte for the 2013–2014 academic year was $41,000. The Law School Transparency estimated debt-financed cost of attendance for three years was $194,000.

== See also ==
- List of defunct law schools in the United States
