= Interventional pain management =

Medical subspecialty for treating pain

Interventional pain management or interventional pain medicine is a medical subspecialty defined by the National Uniforms Claims Committee (NUCC) as " invasive interventions such as the discipline of medicine devoted to the diagnosis and treatment of pain related disorders principally with the application of interventional techniques in managing sub acute, chronic, persistent, and intractable pain, independently or in conjunction with other modalities of treatment". Medicare Payment Advisory Commission (MedPAC) defined interventional techniques as "minimally invasive procedures including, percutaneous precision needle placement, with placement of drugs in targeted areas or ablation of targeted nerves; and some surgical techniques such as laser or endoscopic diskectomy, intrathecal infusion pumps and spinal cord stimulators, for the diagnosis and management of chronic, persistent or intractable pain". Minimally invasive interventions, such as facet joint injections, nerve blocks (interrupting the flow of pain signals along specific nerve pathways), neuroaugmentation (including spinal cord stimulation and peripheral nerve stimulation), vertebroplasty, kyphoplasty, nucleoplasty, endoscopic discectomy, and implantable drug delivery systems are utilized in managing subacute or chronic pain.

== History ==
Early efforts at interventional pain management date back to the origins of regional analgesia and nerve blocks, and gradually evolved into a distinct specialty. Tuffer described the first therapeutic nerve block for pain management in 1899. Von Gaza developed diagnostic blockade in pain management, using procaine for determining the pain's pathways. Modern-day contributors include Bonica, Winnie, Raj, Racz, Bogduk, and others. The term "interventional pain management" was first used by pain management specialist Steven D. Waldman in 1996 to define the emerging specialty. The subspecialty of interventional pain management has received a specific specialty designation by the United States National Uniform Billing Committee to allow its practitioners to bill federal healthcare programs, including Medicare and Medicaid. Physicians who practice interventional pain management are represented by a variety of pain management organizations, including the American Society of Interventional Pain Physicians (ASIPP), founded by Laxmaiah Manchikanti in 1998, which solely represents interventional pain management professionals.

== Nerve blocks ==
Nerve blocks involve the injection of local anesthetics, corticosteroids, or neurolytic agents near specific nerves or nerve bundles to disrupt pain signal transmission. Commonly performed nerve blocks include celiac plexus block for visceral and cancer pain, stellate ganglion block for sympathetically mediated upper extremity pain, medial branch block for facet joint pain, and greater occipital nerve block for cervicogenic headaches and occipital neuralgia. Procedures may be performed under fluoroscopic or ultrasound guidance to improve precision and reduce risk. When used diagnostically, nerve blocks help identify the source of pain; as a therapeutic modality, repeated blocks may provide cumulative long-term relief.

== Radiofrequency ablation ==
Radiofrequency ablation (RFA) uses radiofrequency waves to generate heat and selectively destroy nerve tissue responsible for transmitting pain signals. A needle-electrode is positioned near the target nerve under fluoroscopic or ultrasound guidance; application of radiofrequency energy thermally ablates the nerve, with pain relief typically lasting from several months to years. RFA is widely employed for facet joint–mediated axial back pain, sacroiliac joint pain, chronic knee pain, and trigeminal neuralgia. Pulsed radiofrequency (PRF), a variant that uses intermittent rather than continuous current, modulates nerve function without thermal destruction and is applied for neuropathic conditions such as radiculopathy and postherpetic neuralgia.

== Platelet-rich plasma ==
Platelet-rich plasma (PRP) therapy concentrates growth factors from a patient's own blood and injects them into injured or degenerated musculoskeletal structures. The alpha granules of platelets contain platelet-derived growth factor (PDGF), transforming growth factor-beta (TGF-β), and vascular endothelial growth factor (VEGF), which are believed to promote tissue regeneration and modulate chronic inflammation. PRP injections are used in interventional pain management for knee osteoarthritis, chronic rotator cuff tendinopathy, lateral epicondylitis, and discogenic back pain.

== Radiation ==
Radiotherapy is used when drug treatment is failing to control the pain of a growing tumor, such as in bone metastasis (most commonly), penetration of soft tissue, or compression of sensory nerves. Often, low doses are adequate to produce analgesia, thought to be due to a reduction in pressure or, possibly, interference with the tumor's production of pain-promoting chemicals. Radiopharmaceuticals that target specific tumors have been used to treat the pain of metastatic illnesses. Relief may occur within a week of treatment and may last from two to four months.

== Neurolytic block ==
Cross section of the spinal cord showing the subarachnoid cavity, and spinal nerve roots including the dorsal root ganglion

A neurolytic block is the deliberate injury of a nerve by the application of chemicals (in which case the procedure is called "neurolysis") or physical agents such as freezing or heating ("neurotomy"). These interventions cause degeneration of the nerve's fibers and temporary interference with the transmission of pain signals. In these procedures, the thin protective layer around the nerve fiber, the basal lamina, is preserved so that, as a damaged fiber regrows, it travels within its basal lamina tube and connects with the correct loose end, and function may be restored. Surgically cutting a nerve severs these basal lamina tubes, and without them to channel the regrowing fibers to their lost connections, a painful neuroma or deafferentation pain may develop. This is why the neurolytic is preferred over the surgical block.

== Cutting or destruction of nervous tissue ==
Cross-section of the spinal cord showing the dorsal column and the anterolateral spinothalamic tracts

Surgical cutting or destruction of peripheral or central nervous tissue is now rarely used in the treatment of pain. Procedures include neurectomy, cordotomy, dorsal root entry zone lesioning, and cingulotomy.

Neurectomy involves cutting a nerve, and is (rarely) used in patients with short life expectancy who are unsuitable for drug therapy due to ineffectiveness or intolerance. The dorsal root or dorsal root ganglion (that carry mostly sensory signals) may be usefully targeted (called rhizotomy); with the dorsal root ganglion possibly the more effective target because some sensory fibers enter the spinal cord from the dorsal root ganglion via the ventral (motor) root, and these would not be interrupted by dorsal root neurectomy. Because nerves often carry both sensory and motor fibers, motor impairment is a possible side effect of neurectomy. A common result of this procedure is "deafferentation pain", wherein, 6–9 months after surgery, pain returns at greater intensity.

Cordotomy involves cutting into the spinothalamic tracts, which run up the front/side (anterolateral) quadrant of the spinal cord, carrying heat and pain signals to the brain.

Pancoast tumor pain has been effectively treated with dorsal root entry zone (DREZ) lesioning—damaging a region of the spinal cord where peripheral pain signals cross to spinal cord fibers. This is major surgery, carrying the risk of significant neurological side effects.

Cingulotomy involves cutting the fibers that carry signals directly from the cingulate gyrus to the entorhinal cortex in the brain. It reduces the unpleasantness of pain (without affecting its intensity), but may have cognitive side effects.

== Intrathecal infusion ==
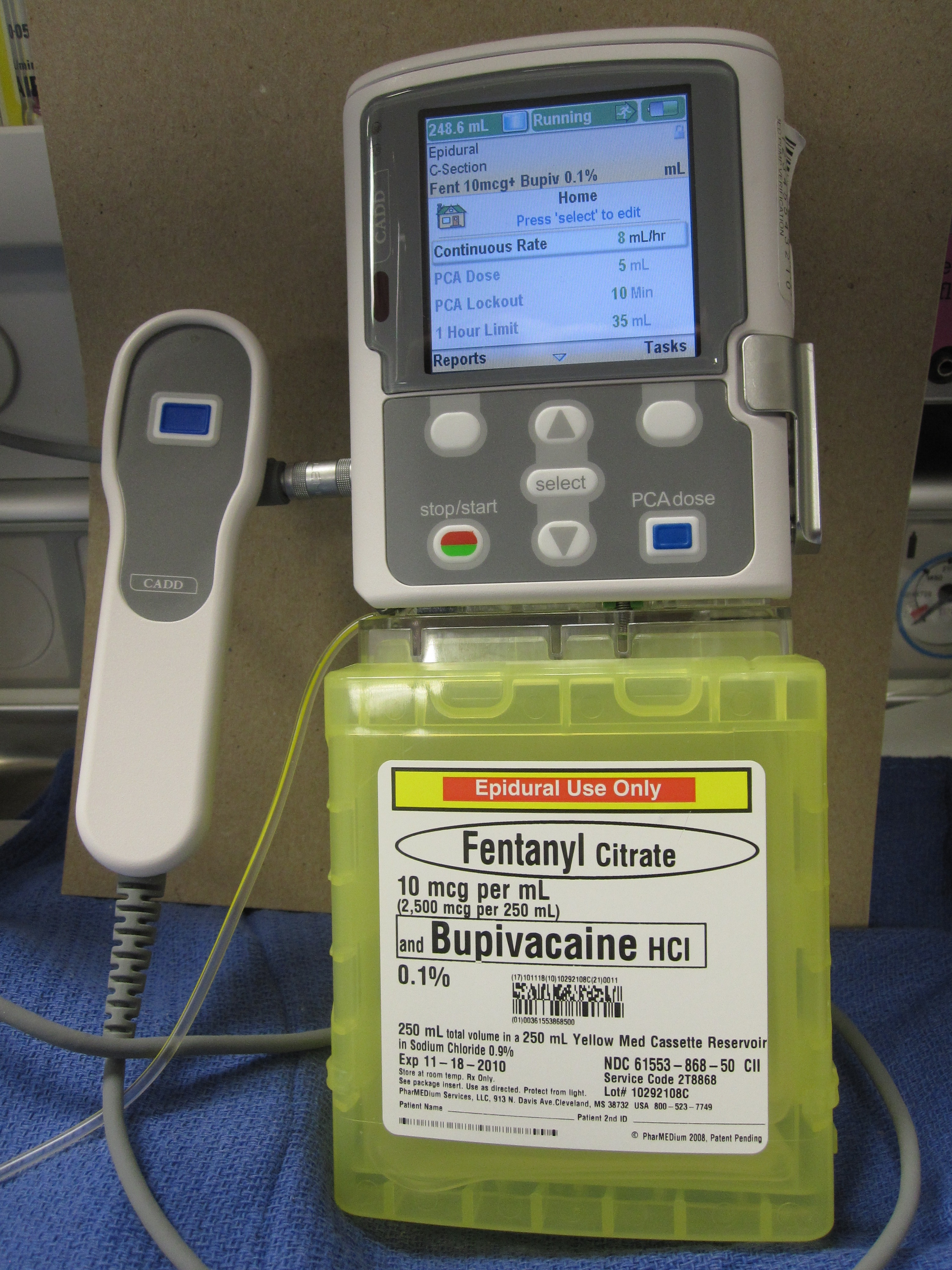
A patient-controlled analgesia infusion pump, configured for epidural administration of fentanyl and bupivacaine

Delivery of an opioid such as morphine, hydromorphone, fentanyl, sufentanyl or meperidine directly into the subarachnoid cavity (the space between the spinal cord's inner, waterproof sheath and its outer protective sheaths) provides enhanced analgesia with reduced systemic side effects, and has reduced the level of pain in otherwise intractable cases. The anxiolytic clonidine, or the nonopioid analgesic ziconotide, and local anesthetics such as bupivacaine, ropivacaine or tetracaine may also be infused along with the opioid.

== Epidural infusion ==
The outermost, protective sheath surrounding the spinal cord is called the dura mater. Between this and the surrounding vertebrae is the epidural space, filled with connective tissue, fat and blood vessels, and crossed by the spinal nerve roots. A catheter may be inserted into this space for three to six months, to deliver anesthetics or analgesics. The line carrying the drug may be threaded under the skin to emerge at the front of the patient, a process called tunneling. This is recommended with long term use so as to reduce the chance of any infection at the exit site reaching the epidural space.

== Spinal cord stimulation ==
Electrical stimulation of the dorsal columns of the spinal cord can produce analgesia. First, the leads are implanted, guided by the patient's report and fluoroscopy, and the generator is worn externally for several days to assess efficacy. If pain is reduced by more than half, the therapy is deemed to be suitable. A small pocket is cut into the tissue beneath the skin of the upper buttocks, chest wall or abdomen and the leads are threaded under the skin from the stimulation site to the pocket, where they are attached to the snugly-fitting generator. It seems to be more helpful with neuropathic and ischemic pain than nociceptive pain, and is not often used in the treatment of cancer pain.

== Deep brain stimulation ==
Ongoing electrical stimulation of structures deep within the brain – the periaqueductal gray and periventricular gray for nociceptive pain, and the internal capsule, ventral posterolateral nucleus and ventral posteromedial nucleus for neuropathic pain – has produced impressive results with some patients but results vary and appropriate patient selection is important. One study of seventeen patients with intractable cancer pain found that thirteen were virtually painless and only four required opioid analgesics on release from hospital after the intervention. Most ultimately did resort to opioids, usually in the last few weeks of life.

== Hypophysectomy ==
Hypophysectomy is the destruction of the pituitary gland, and has been used successfully on metastatic breast and prostate cancer pain.
