= World Institute of Pain =

The World Institute of Pain (WIP) is an international non-profit medical society for physicians practicing interventional pain medicine.

The official scientific journal of the WIP is Pain Practice, established in 2001, which publishes information for pain management.
