= Florida Coastal School of Law =

For-profit law school in Jacksonville, Florida

Coordinates: 30°13′58″N 81°34′49″W

- Motto: Lex Ubique Est (law is everywhere)
- Established: 1996; Closed 2021
- School type: Private for-profit law school
- Dean: Peter Goplerud
- Location: Jacksonville, Florida, US
- USNWR ranking: 147th-193rd (bottom 25%)
- Bar pass rate: 31% (Florida bar exam, July 2022)
- Website: fcsl.edu
- ABA profile: accreditation withdrawn

Florida Coastal School of Law was a private for-profit law school in Jacksonville, Florida. It was established in 1996 and was the last operating of three for-profit law schools of the InfiLaw System owned by Sterling Partners. Because of funding and accreditation issues, the school closed its doors in 2021. U.S. News & World Report ranks Coastal Law 147-193, its lowest law school ranking. In July 2022, the school had the lowest Florida bar passage rate of all Florida law schools, at 31%.

== Accreditation and closure ==
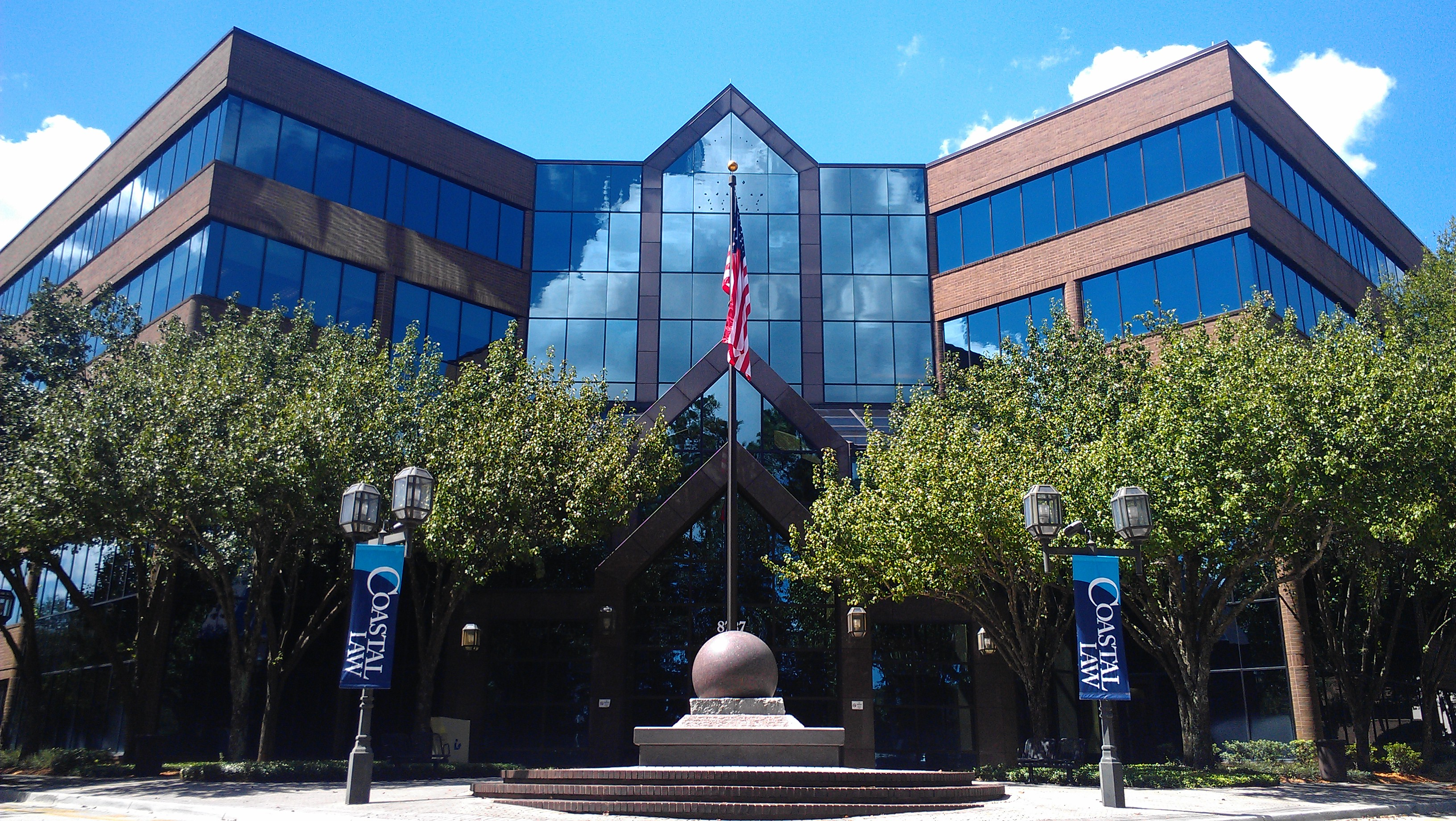
The entrance to FCSL on Baypine Road

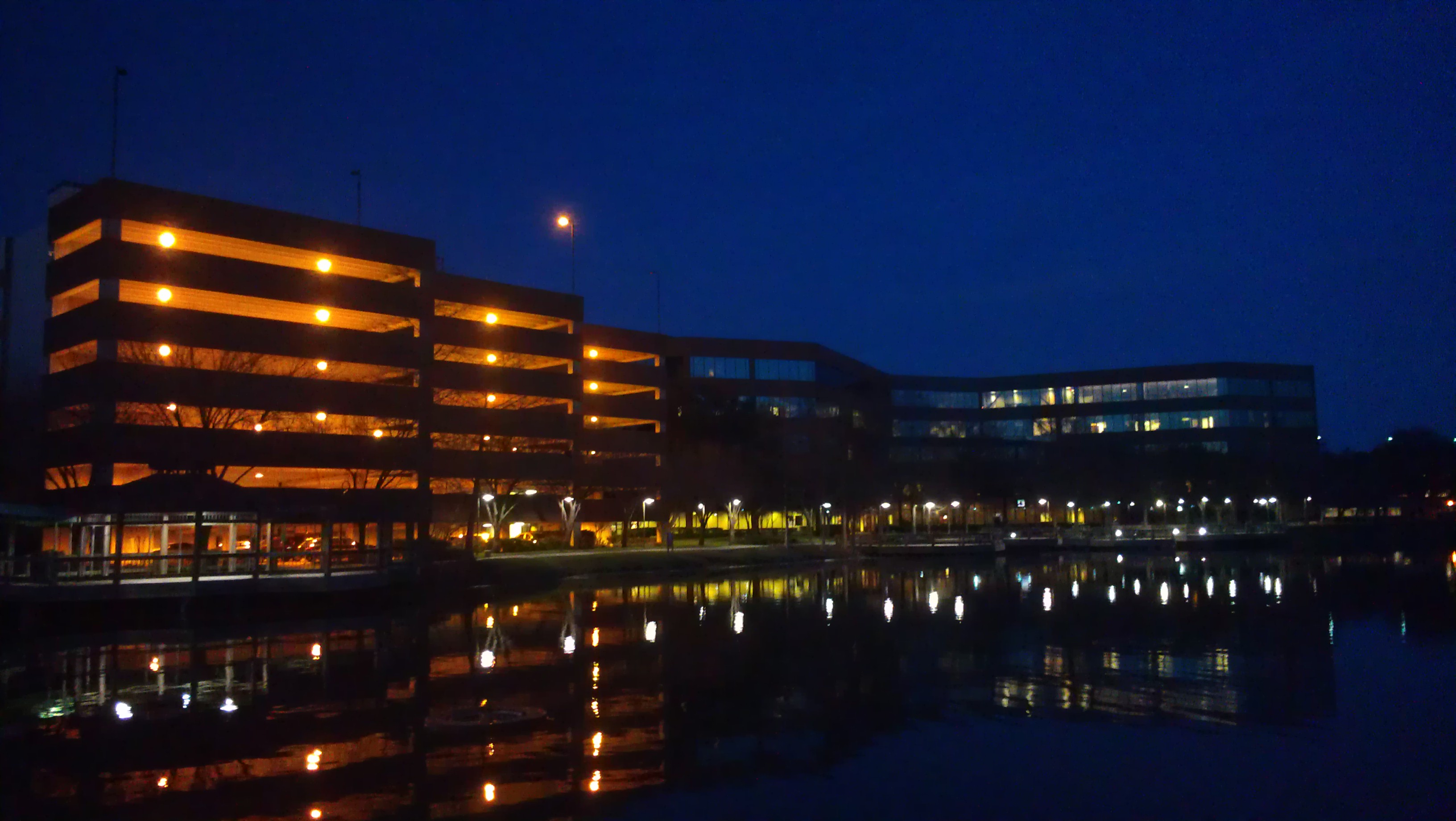
The lakeside of FCSL at night

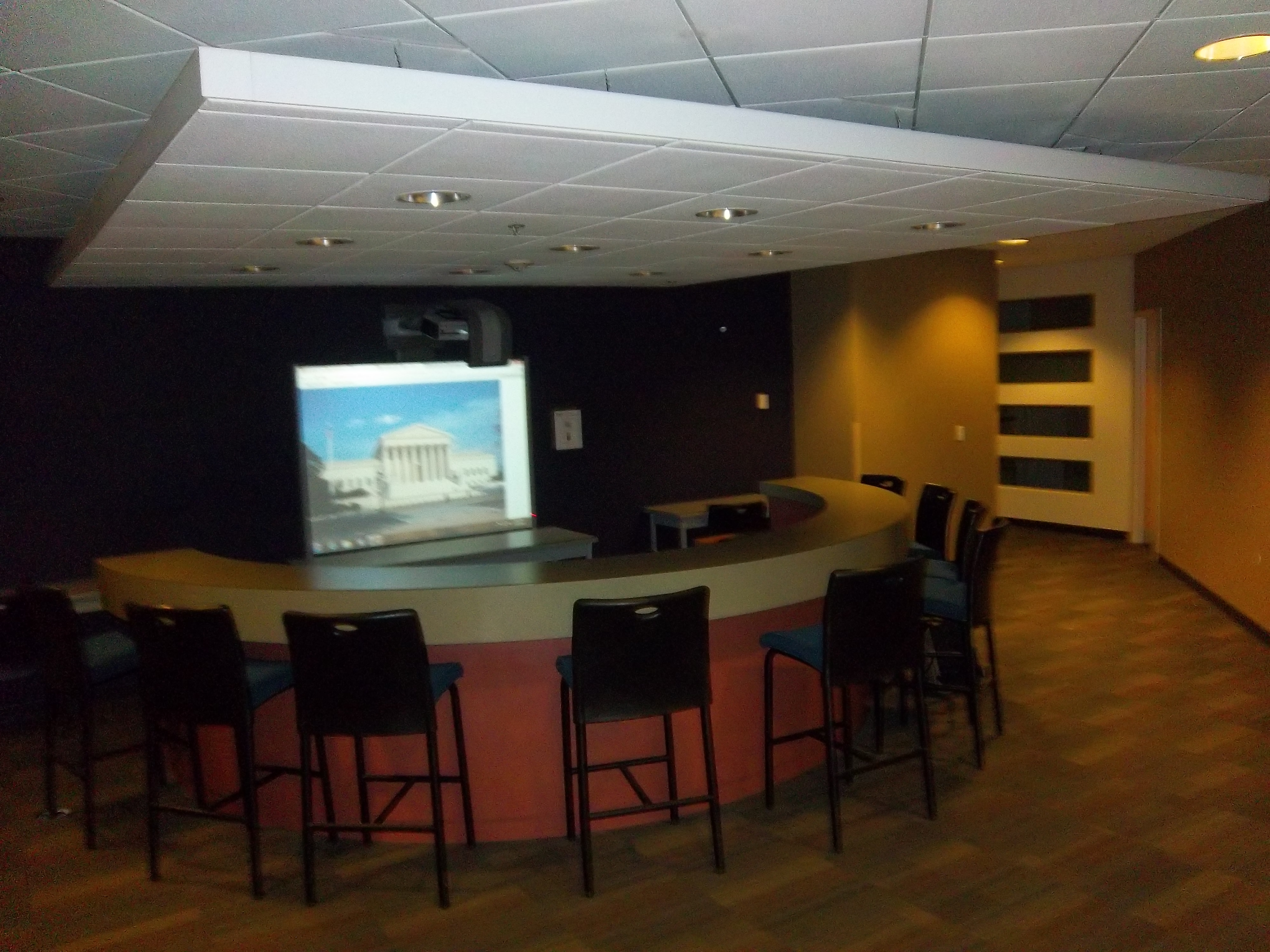
Four knowledge bars served students by providing a forum for students and professors to continue conversations outside of the classroom.

The school was originally accredited by the American Bar Association (ABA) in 2002. In October 2017, the school received a letter from the ABA stating that Florida Coastal was not in compliance with several ABA academic standards, and requiring the school to submit a report by November 1, 2017, regarding the school's efforts to return to compliance, in advance of an appearance before the ABA Accreditation Committee in March 2018. The school's dean sent a letter to the student body, responding to the ABA letter, seeking to dispel what he said were "misconceptions" about the ABA's letter. At its May 2019 meeting, the ABA found Florida Coastal fully in compliance with the ABA standards. Florida Coastal remained a fully ABA accredited law school.

On May 15, 2020, the council of the American Bar Association's Section of Legal Education and Admissions to the Bar met remotely and determined this school and nine others had significant noncompliance with Standard 316. This standard was revised in 2019 to provide that at least 75% of an accredited law school's graduates who took a bar exam must pass one within two years of graduation. The school was asked to submit a report by February 1, 2021; and, if the council did not find the report demonstrated compliance, the school would be asked to appear before the council at its May 2021 meeting. By August 2020, Florida Coastal School of Law was able to demonstrate compliance, asserting that 75% of its 2018 graduates had passed a bar exam, and the 2019 cohort was on track for similarly qualifying results.

However, a new problem arose in Spring 2021 when the U.S. Department of Education terminated the school's access to federal student financial aid and directed the school to file a teach-out plan with the ABA. The plan submitted in April was rejected by an executive committee of that ABA section, as lacking several required items and not providing sufficient detail as to other items. A revised plan was considered in May, but that plan was also rejected.

The school resubmitted its application for Title IV eligibility, but the U.S. Department of Education turned down its request. Richard Cordray, the department's federal student aid chief operating officer, said in a press release, "Florida Coastal School of Law operated recklessly and irresponsibly, putting its students at financial risk rather than providing the opportunities they were seeking. Our commitment is to stand up for all students and ensure their institutions are held to the standards our students and communities expect and deserve." The press release also said that school owner InfiLaw had relinquished its ownership, and audited financial statements for the school raised substantial doubt that it could continue operating.

A teach-out plan was finally approved in June 2021, with the school to offer no further classes after the end of the Summer 2021 term. Some students would transfer to other law schools, while others would attend classes elsewhere but graduate with Florida Coastal degrees. The school's accreditation was to be continued until July 1, 2023, for the limited purpose of allowing currently-enrolled students to receive course credits at other accredited law schools.

Notwithstanding that the school acknowledged that it was bound by the teach-out plan, Florida Coastal in July 2021 filed a lawsuit against the U.S. Department of Education alleging the agency acted arbitrarily and capriciously by terminating the school's participation in the loan program.

== Academics ==
The median GPA of students at Coastal Law was 2.92 in 2017 and 3.14 in 2020, and the median LSAT was 145 in 2017 and 150 in 2020.

In addition to its curriculum for a juris doctor, Coastal Law offered an environmental law certificate, sports law certificate, international comparative law certificate, family law certificate, and an advanced legal research and writing certificate. Additionally, Coastal Law offered accelerated dual degree programs, with Jacksonville University, that allowed students to complete a juris doctor and a M.B.A. or a M.P.P. in four years.

=== Awards ===
- In 2010, Coastal Law was the recipient of the American Bar Association E. Smythe Gambrell Professionalism Award.
- In 2011, the Jacksonville Area Legal Aid (JALA) awarded Coastal Law the Robert J. Beckham Equal Justice Award for its partnership with JALA and its commitment to pro bono legal aid to the Jacksonville community.
- In 2013, the National Jurist ranked Coastal Law among the top innovative law schools.
- In 2014, Coastal Law made the American Bar Association's "Top Ten List" of law schools teaching the technology of legal practice.
- In 2015, the National Jurist gave Coastal Law an "A+ or A" for being one of the twenty best law schools for practical training.

== Bar passage rate ==
The Florida Bar passage rate of Coastal Law graduates, compared to the average passing rate of all Florida law schools, is set forth below. In July 2022, the school had the lowest Florida bar passage rate of all Florida law schools, at 31%.

Exam	Coastal Law	State average
Feb 2014	72.9%	72.9%
July 2014	58	71.8
Feb 2015	74.5	64.3
July 2015	59.3	68.9
Feb 2016	32.7	58.4
July 2016	51.9	68.2
Feb 2017	25.0	57.7
July 2017	47.7	71.3
Feb 2018	62.1	57.9
July 2019	71.0	73.9
Oct 2020	57.6	71.7
Feb 2021	68.4	62.4
July 2022	31%	51%

== Ranking ==
U.S. News & World Report ranked Coastal Law 147-193, its lowest law school ranking, the bottom quartile of all law schools in the United States.

== Post-graduation employment and debt ==
=== Student debt ===
The average indebtedness of 2017 graduates who incurred law school debt was $160,942 (not including undergraduate debt), and 93.5% of 2017 graduates took on debt.

=== Employment outcomes ===
Coastal Law's Law School Transparency score was 48.4%, indicating the percentage of the Class of 2018 who obtained full-time long-term jobs practicing law within nine months of graduation, excluding solo practitioners.

ABA Employment Summary for 2018 Graduates	Percentage
Employed - Bar Passage Required	52.1%
Employed - J.D. Advantage	14.0%
Employed - Professional Position	8.0%
Employed - Non-Professional Position	8.0%
Pursuing Graduate Degree Full Time	2.2%
Unemployed - Not Seeking	2.2%
Unemployed - Seeking	18.8%
Employment Status Unknown	1.1%
Total of 186 Graduates

Of those graduates who did obtain employment, in 2017 the median starting salary in the public sector was $42,250, and in the private sector it was $45,000.

== Tuition and cost ==
The total cost of attendance (indicating the cost of tuition, fees, and living expenses) at Coastal Law for the 2019–20 academic year was $63,022. The Law School Transparency estimated debt-financed cost of attendance for three years was $217,870.

== Extracurricular activities ==
=== Moot court ===
Each year, the University of Houston Law Center's Blakely Advocacy Institute ranks the top moot court programs in the United States by assessing the quality of the competition a school participated in, the size of the competitions, and the school's performance in those competitions. Florida Coastal in those rankings:

Academic Year	Rank
2018-2019	2
2017-2018	9
2016-2017	20
2015-2016	15
2014-2015	1
2013-2014	1
2012-2013	2
2011-2012	5

=== Mock trial ===
Coastal Law's mock trial team competed with law students across the state of Florida and the United States. The team members presented their case before a judge and jury. Acceptance into the team was based upon a competitive meritocratic process that judged the student's ability. Students were only eligible to try out for the mock trial team during their first year in law school.

=== Law review ===
The Florida Coastal Law Review was a legal journal edited by second and third year law students under the guidance of law professors. The journals are retrievable through the legal databases LexisNexis and Westlaw. The journal was published three times a year. Students could join by being in the top 5% of their class or by submitting a high quality writing piece to law review.

== Notable alumni ==
- Renatha Francis
- Michele Rayner
- Said Sharbini (fl. 2022), American politician
- Matthew Shirk
- Inna Vernikov

== See also ==
- List of defunct law schools in the United States
