= Lincoln Business College =

Defunct business college in Lincoln, Nebraska

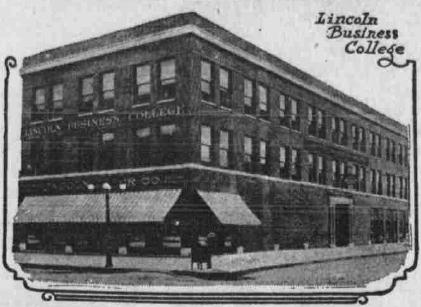
Lincoln Business College in 1915 at Fourteenth and P Streets

Lincoln Business College was a business college located in Lincoln, Nebraska, United States. It was founded in 1884, and by 1925 had merged with the Nebraska School of Business to become the Lincoln School of Commerce. It later became Hamilton College, Kaplan University, and its ultimate successor was the Lincoln branch of Purdue University Global, which shuttered the college in 2021.

== History ==
The school was founded in 1884 by F.F. Roose. Its original location was in an office building at the corner of Eleventh and O Streets. It subsequently moved to the Oliver Building at Thirteenth and P streets, where it remained for 16 years. In 1914, it moved to a new building on the northwest corner of Fourteenth and P Streets. E.C. Bigger was president of the college in the 1910s.

By 1925, the Lincoln Business College and Nebraska School of Business (a former location of Brown's Business College) were merged and became the Lincoln School of Commerce. The school's former building on 14th Street was still standing as of 2025 and was occupied by restaurants and nonprofit collaborate working space.

== Later history ==
In April 1997, many years after the school relocated to K Street in the 1960s, the Lincoln School of Commerce was acquired by Educational Medical, Inc. Educational Medical (renamed as Quest Education Corporation) was acquired by Kaplan, Inc., in 2000, and in 2004 the school was renamed the Lincoln campus of Iowa-based Hamilton College. In October 2007, all of the Hamilton campuses were merged into Kaplan University.

== Athletics ==
The Lincoln School of Commerce competed in college athletics as part of the National Junior College Athletic Association. Following the name change to Hamilton College, the school's teams were known as the Hamilton Aliens.

== Notable alumni ==
- Samuel Roy McKelvie (1901), Governor of Nebraska (1919–1923)
- Theodore C. Diers, Wyoming state representative and senator
- Mari Sandoz (1921), historian and novelist
