= Kaplan Teachers Union =

Teachers union in New York City

Kaplan Teachers Union is a collective bargaining unit of English as a second language teachers at Kaplan International Colleges in New York City. It was voted into effect on June 7, 2012 and certified by the National Labor Relations Board. The members are represented by The Newspaper Guild of New York, Local 31003 CWA.

Unionization was unprecedented in the for-profit ESL industry, making the Kaplan Teachers Union the first recognized bargaining unit for teachers in the for-profit language industry in the United States. In the US for-profit education industry, it is just one of three such units, the other two being Art Institute schools in New York and Philadelphia. The first Kaplan school to organize internationally was the Auckland, New Zealand campus, in May 2008. Bradford College teachers in Adelaide, Australia, immediately joined the Independent Education Union when Kaplan bought the college in 2007. Other Kaplan ESL schools to have organized include Chicago, Vancouver, Toronto, and Liverpool.

Kaplan International Colleges is a branch of Kaplan, Inc., which is a subsidiary of The Washington Post Company. Kaplan, Inc. was founded in New York by the teacher and tutor Stanley Kaplan and provides higher education, test preparation, professional training courses and language instruction. Kaplan International Colleges teaches English in forty language schools in seven countries around the world. Kaplan, Inc. earned a revenue of US$2.9 billion in 2010 and has since acquired language schools in Singapore, Japan, Australia and Spain.

The Kaplan Teachers Union's grievances include low pay, no sick days nor affordable health care. Pay is as low as $16 per hour for teaching, and minimum wage for preparation work and grading.
