= StudentAdvisor =

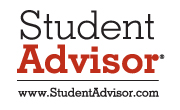
StudentAdvisor.com Logo

StudentAdvisor was a US-based college discovery site owned by The Washington Post Company. On this site students could research colleges with free match and compare tools and browse college reviews written by students and alumni. StudentAdvisor was a member of the National Association for College Admission Counseling (NACAC) and was headquartered in Cambridge, Massachusetts.

== History ==
StudentAdvisor along with CourseAdvisor.com, was founded in 2004 by a group of entrepreneurs and alumni from MIT and the University of Massachusetts/Amherst. In 2007, CourseAdvisor and StudentAdvisor were acquired by the Washington Post Company, becoming a wholly owned subsidiary of the Company. In 2009, Avenue100 Media Solutions was formed to serve as a holding company for the sites that the team managed. Avenue100 is headquartered just outside Boston in Woburn, Massachusetts.

In September 2010 StudentAdvisor was relaunched in partnership with Newsweek Education, the education vertical published by Newsweek Magazine. At that time Newsweek was also a Washington Post Company, however in November 2010 Newsweek merged with the news and opinion website The Daily Beast and is no longer affiliated with StudentAdvisor.

In April 2011 StudentAdvisor launched a $24,000 scholarship contest in which they awarded 24 $1,000 scholarships in 24 hours to college students for reviewing their schools on the site.

Top 100 Social Media Colleges

In March 2011, StudentAdvisor released its "Top 100 Social Media Colleges". These rankings aimed to demonstrate the best uses of social media among colleges in the United States. In October 2011, this project was named a finalist in the Massachusetts Innovation and Technology Exchange’s (MITX) 16th Annual Interactive Awards.

In August 2011 StudentAdvisor moved to new headquarters in Cambridge, Massachusetts.

July 2011, The Washington Post Company sold its interest in digital marketing company Avenue100 Media Solutions to a management group but retained ownership of StudentAdvisor.com.

As of 2019, the StudentAdvisor.com website redirects to Purdue University Global.
