= Kaplan IT Training =

Kaplan IT Training, formerly Transcender, provides IT certification practice exams, practice labs, and online learning courses. Kaplan IT Training offers test preparation solutions that are used by IT professionals to improve their technical skills and prepare for industry certification exams.

== Purpose ==
Kaplan IT Training helps improve and prepare the skills of professionals in the following companies:

- Microsoft
- Cisco
- CompTIA
- Oracle
- ITIL
- ISC2
- PMI
- EC-Council
- Adobe
- Axelos
- GIAC
- ISACA
- Logical Operations
- LPI
- VMware
- Juniper Networks
- Amazon Web Services

Kaplan IT Trainings's products are used by certified training and education centers, college and university students, and IT staff members at many large corporations.

== Company ==
Transcender was established in 1992, shortly after Microsoft Corporation introduced its certification program. In December 2003, Transcender joined Kaplan IT Learning and became a division of Kaplan, Inc. Kaplan is a wholly owned subsidiary of Graham Holdings Company (NYSE: GHC), formerly known as The Washington Post Company, and is a provider of online higher education, K-12 services, and professional training programs. Kaplan was founded by Stanley H. Kaplan, an American businessman who is recognized as a pioneer of scholastic test preparation. In 2017, Transcender became known as Transcender, powered by Kaplan IT Training.

== Certification preparation products ==
Kaplan IT Training's IT certification preparation solutions reinforce learning objectives and validate knowledge to help students prepare for their certification exams. Some of their products include:

- Exam simulations
- Flashcards
- Skillsoft eLearning
- Practice Labs
- GMetrix exam preparation

The Kaplan IT Training team comprises IT-certified subject matter experts, technical writers, and technical editors to create and edit its practice exam items, explanations, and references.

== Awards ==
Kaplan IT Training, formerly Transcender, has received several industry awards. The latest awards include:

- Windows IT Pro: Editor's Best Training, 2008
- Redmond Magazine: Best Exam Preparation Product or Service, 2007, 2006, 2005
- Windows IT Pro: Best Computer-Based Training, 2006 (Reader's Choice)
- CertCities.com: Best Practice Exams, 2005, 2004, 2003, 2002
- asp.netPRO: Best Training, 2004 (Reader's Choice)
- Windows Server System Magazine: Best Product for Training and Certification, 2004
- Microsoft Certified Professional Magazine: Best Exam Preparation Product, 2004
