= Oracle Certification Program =

Professional certification

The Oracle Certification Program certifies candidates on skills and knowledge related to Oracle products and technologies.

Credentials are granted based on a combination of passing exams, training and performance-based assignments, depending on the level of certification. Oracle certifications are tangible benchmarks of experience and expertise that Oracle claims to help a participant stand out in a crowd among employers.

There are 6 levels of Oracle Certification credentials: Oracle Certified Junior Associate (OCJA), Oracle Certified Associate (OCA), Oracle Certified Professional (OCP), Oracle Certified Master (OCM), Oracle Certified Expert (OCE) and Oracle Certified Specialist (OCS). These credentials are spread across 9 technology pillars and further broken down into product family and product groupings. Certifications are also defined by job role on the Oracle Certification website.

1. The Oracle Certified Junior Associate (OJA) credential is a novice-level certification focused on students in secondary schools, two-year colleges and four year colleges and universities and faculty members who teach foundational Java and computer science classes.
2. The Oracle Certified Associate (OCA) credential is the first step toward achieving an Oracle Certified Professional certification. The OCA credential ensures a candidate is equipped with fundamental skills, providing a strong foundation for supporting Oracle products.
3. The Oracle Certified Professional (OCP) credential builds upon the fundamental skills demonstrated by the OCA. The Oracle Certified Professional has a command of a specific area of Oracle technology and demonstrates a high level of knowledge and skills. IT managers often use the OCP credential to evaluate the qualifications of employees and job candidates.
4. The Oracle Certified Master (OCM) credential recognizes the highest level of demonstrated skills, knowledge and proven abilities. OCMs are equipped to answer the most difficult questions and solve the most complex problems. The Oracle Certified Master certification validates a candidate's abilities through passing rigorous performance-based exams. The certification typically builds upon the fundamental skills of the OCA and the more advanced skills of the OCP.
5. The Oracle Certified Expert (OCE) credentials recognize competency in specific, niche oriented technologies, architectures or domains. Credentials are independent of the traditional OCA, OCP, OCM hierarchy, but often build upon skills proven as an OCA or OCP. Competencies falling under the umbrella of the Expert program range from foundational skills to mastery of advanced technologies.
6. The Oracle Certified Specialist (OCS) credentials are typically implementation-oriented certifications targeting employees of current Oracle partners, though the certifications are available to all candidates, partner or not. These certifications are built on very focused products or skillsets and provide a solid measure of a candidate's level of expertise in a particular area.

== Java Certification list ==
The following list of Java exams are currently available in Oracle certification and path.

Certification Name	Exam Number	Exam Name
Oracle Certified Associate, Java SE 8 Programmer	1Z0-808	Java SE 8 Programmer I
Oracle Certified Professional, Java SE 8 Programmer	1Z0-809	Java SE 8 Programmer II
Oracle Certified Professional, Java SE 11 Developer	1Z0-817	Upgrade OCP Java 6, 7 & 8 to Java SE 11 Developer
Oracle Certified Professional, Java SE 11 Developer	1Z0-819	Java SE 11 Programmer
Oracle Certified Professional, Java EE 7 Application Developer	1Z0-900	Java EE 7 Application Developer
Oracle Certified Master, Java EE 6 Enterprise Architect	1Z0-807	Java EE 6 Enterprise Architect Certified Master
Oracle Certified Master, Java EE 6 Enterprise Architect	1Z0-865	Java (EE) Enterprise Architect Certified Master Assignment
Oracle Certified Master, Java EE 6 Enterprise Architect	1Z0-866	Java (EE) Enterprise Architect Certified Master Essay

== Requirements ==
Oracle University offers different certifications for different Oracle products and services. A candidate chooses a certain certification that he/she wishes to earn and then follow the requirements for that particular certification. Requirements may include passing an exam offered by Pearson VUE, earning a prerequisite certification, completing training, or submitting a course verification form.

Prior to taking an Oracle Certification exam, a candidate must register for a VUE account and authenticate their CertView account as well. An exam voucher can be purchased from Oracle University or the candidate can register for and pay for the exam directly on the Pearson VUE website without a voucher. Vouchers can also be purchase from an authorized Oracle Partner. The candidate should bring two valid forms of identification; both must contain your signature, one should contain a photo, one should be government-issued.

A purchased exam voucher should be used within 6 months or it will be forfeited without any refund.

A candidate can prepare for the exam by attending training and prep seminars, offered by Oracle University and practice tests from Kaplan and Transcender. These are optional and not required to have a certification.

If the candidate failed the exam, a 5-day waiting period should pass before retaking the exam. The 2nd exam attempt must be paid in full. If the candidate fails to show up on the scheduled testing time and date, the exam will be voided and no refund shall be given. There are restrictions for candidates who are coming from Cuba, Iran, North Korea, Sudan, and Syria. A candidate who is minor should have a consent from his/her parent or guardian.

Typically, one exam is associated with a certification. However, some certifications require two. Aside from a passed exam, some certifications requires the candidate to attend training at Oracle University. For Java EE Master certification, the exams are not multiple choice, instead an assignment which should be finished and an essay exam as well. Both the Assignment and the Essay must be completed within 6 months of purchasing the Assignment. Failed Assignments must be resubmitted within 30 days.

Some certification levels build on each other; for example, an Associate certification is required for Professional, while a Professional certification is required for Master. The Expert and Specialist certification does not have any prerequisite certification like Associate. Oracle has recently introduced Junior Associate certifications (e.g., "Java Foundations Junior Associate 1Z0-811" exam) that targets school and college students.

== Oracle Certified Associate Java SE Programmer I (formerly the Sun Certified Java Programmer) ==
The Oracle Certified Associate Java SE 8 Programmer tests the candidate's knowledge of the Java programming language and is a prerequisite to being an Oracle Certified Programmer.

While most advanced certifications focus on the candidate's knowledge of the API, this entry-level exam focuses on variables, class and interface definitions, arrays, exception handling, encapsulation, polymorphism, and flow control. The candidate must also demonstrate how to use strings and array lists. The version 8 of the test was made available as a final release since December 2014. It tested the candidate's knowledge of lambdas, boxing (auto-wrapping), and the new date and time API.

There will no longer be an OCA credential awarded for Java SE 11.

== Oracle Certified Professional Java SE Programmer (also formerly the Sun Certified Java Programmer) ==
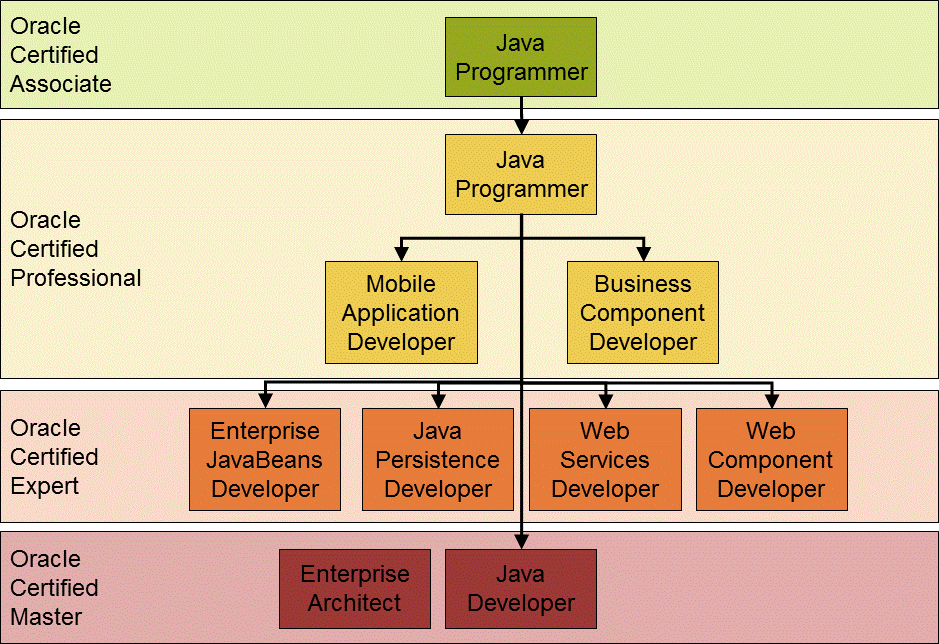
Java Certification Path

Oracle's Certified Professional Java SE Programmer (OCPJP) exam is the fundamental exam required to demonstrate solid understanding of Java and some of its SE APIs and is a prerequisite to a number of the other Java certificates.

It is designed as a fairly detailed test of knowledge of the core features and constructs of the Java programming language. It tests a wide range of Java's APIs and core features, starting from basics such as looping constructs and variables, to more complex topics such as Threads, Collections and Generics. It does not cover specific technology domains such as GUI creation, Web or network programming, though it does cover part of the APIs included in the standard library. The exam tests how well a programmer has understood the language constructs and mechanisms. However it's not a goal of the exam to test the programmer's ability to produce purposeful or efficient programs. It does not test the programmer's ability to write efficient algorithms, for example, though it does test knowledge of which collections should be selected in order to implement efficient algorithms without re-inventing the wheel.

It is assessed through an automatically administered multiple-choice test system and consists of 60 questions which the candidate has 150 minutes to answer. At least 37 questions are needed to be correct to pass (around 61%). To take the test a candidate must buy a voucher from Oracle (approximately US$300 in the US, £150 (excluding VAT) in the UK, AUD 316 plus tax in Australia, Rs. 8000 plus taxes in India) and book the test at least a week in advance. The test consists of multiple choice questions. In June 2011, Oracle moved from Prometric to Pearson VUE as their test provider.
