= Open graph =

Open graph may refer to:

- A confused version of the Closed graph property
- The Open Graph Protocol
