= Positively Languages =

International language education group

- Formerly: Kaplan Languages Group
- Type: Private
- Industry: Language education
- Key people: William Wellesley (executive chair); Caroline Maas (chief operating officer); Zach Holmes (chief financial officer)
- Services: Language courses; Exam preparation; Business language courses; Summer camps
- Owner: Inspirit Capital (since 2026)
- Website: positivelylanguages.com

Positively Languages is an international group of language schools offering English, French and German courses, as well as summer programmes. Formerly part of Kaplan, Inc., it comprises the former Kaplan Languages Group business, Alpadia Language Schools and Azurlingua. ESL Education, a language travel agency within the group, operates under its own name.

In May 2026, Kaplan Languages Group was sold to investment firm Inspirit Capital. Plans to rebrand Kaplan International Languages as Positively Languages were announced in July 2026.

== History ==
=== Development under Kaplan ===
Kaplan expanded its English-language education business in 2006 through the acquisition of Aspect Education, which operated language schools in the United Kingdom, Ireland, Canada, Australia, New Zealand and the United States.

In July 2008, Kaplan acquired Pro Linguis, a Swiss provider of language study programmes.

In September 2019, Kaplan International English was renamed Kaplan International Languages following the acquisition of Alpadia Language Schools, which added French and German courses to its existing English-language programmes. During the COVID-19 pandemic, Kaplan closed some of its language schools amid international travel restrictions.

In June 2024, Kaplan Languages Group acquired Azurlingua, a French-language school based in Nice, France. Established in 1990, Azurlingua continued operating under its own name after the acquisition.

=== Sale and rebranding ===
In February 2026, Kaplan entered into an agreement to sell Kaplan Languages Group, comprising Kaplan International Languages, Alpadia Language Schools, Azurlingua and ESL Education. The transaction was publicly reported in April, with Inspirit Capital identified as the buyer. At the time, the group operated more than 20 language schools in eight countries. The purchase price was not disclosed. The sale was completed on 1 May 2026.

In July 2026, Kaplan International Languages announced plans to adopt the name Positively Languages. Positively Languages officially launched on 28 October 2026. Kaplan International Languages schools began transitioning to the new name, while Alpadia and Azurlingua retained their existing brands. ESL Education also continued operating under its own name. William Wellesley was identified as executive chairman of Positively Languages, while Caroline Maas served as chief operating officer of Kaplan Languages Group during the transition.

== Operations ==
Alpadia Language Schools offers language programmes for adults and young adults in France, Germany and Switzerland, as well as summer camps for children and teenagers in several European countries, including the United Kingdom. Azurlingua provides French-language courses in Nice. ESL Education operates as a language travel agency arranging study programmes through partner language schools. At the time of the sale to Inspirit Capital, its network included more than 200 partner destinations offering courses in 17 languages.

In October 2026, Positively Languages opened an English-language school in St. Julian's, Malta, in premises formerly occupied by EC English. The Malta ELT Council confirmed that the school's licensing application was in the final stages of processing.
