= Andrew S. Rosen =

American businessman

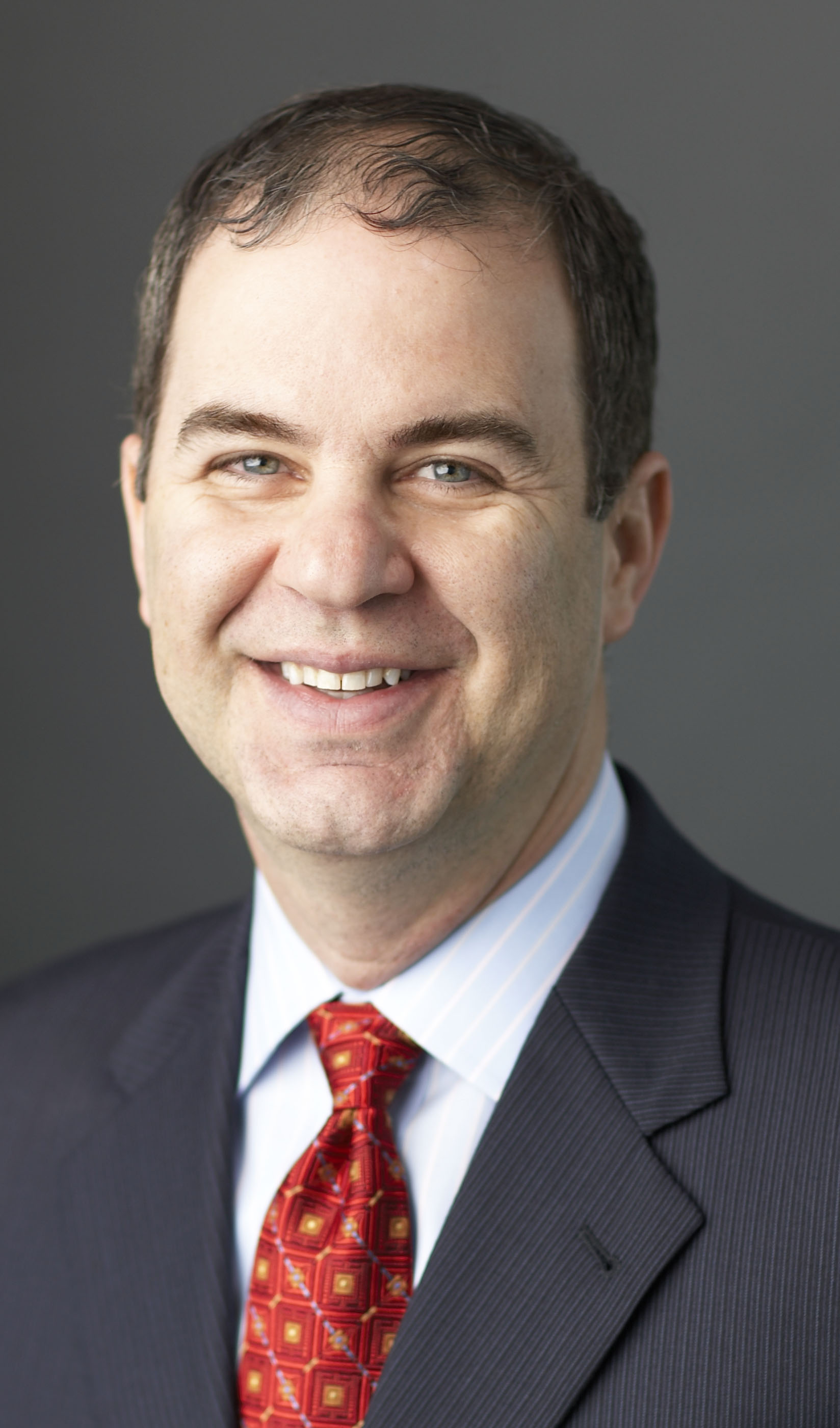
- Occupations: Chairman and CEO of Kaplan, Inc.

Andrew S. Rosen is current chairman and CEO of Kaplan, Inc., a global education company that began as a test prep provider in 1938. It was purchased in 1984 by The Washington Post Company, now Graham Holdings Company.

Rosen worked as a staff attorney for The Washington Post beginning in 1986. He joined Kaplan in 1992 and was named Chairman and CEO in November 2008, following the resignation of long-time Chairman and CEO Jonathan Grayer.

== Education and career ==
Rosen holds an A.B. degree from Duke University and a J.D. from Yale Law School. After law school, Rosen served as law clerk to the Hon. Levin H. Campbell, Chief Judge for the U.S. Court of Appeals for the First Circuit, in Boston.

Rosen joined The Washington Post Company in 1986 as a staff attorney for The Washington Post newspaper; he moved to Newsweek as Assistant Counsel in 1988. When he moved to Kaplan, he served as Center Administrator, Regional Director, and Vice President for Field Management prior to assuming the role of Chief Operating Officer in 1997. He was named President of Kaplan, Inc. in 2002.

He later took over responsibility for all of Kaplan’s higher education operations, including Kaplan University, Concord Law School, and Kaplan Virtual Education. Under his leadership, Kaplan Higher Education has grown to account for half of Kaplan’s $2 billion revenue.

In October 2011, Rosen published his first book, Change.edu: Rebooting for the New Talent Economy. He explores his belief that the American higher education system has strayed from the goals of access, quality, affordability, and accountability and offers ideas on how to restore those traits to America's institutions. Change.edu was listed on Bill Gates's "Reading List" in Foreign Policy magazine's December 2011 "The Foreign Policy Top 100 Global Thinkers" feature. Gates described the book as "truly important for the debate on what needs to be done to improve the success of post-secondary education in America". In a review on Amazon.com, former New York City Schools Chancellor Joel Klein wrote, "this is a must-read book for those who care about fixing our nation’s higher education problems".

== Other roles ==
Rosen serves on the boards of Enterprise Florida, the Broward Workshop, Pine Crest School, the Broward Alliance, and the Council for Educational Change.
