= Kaplan University =

Former for-profit college acquired by Purdue University

Coordinates: 26°8′N 80°12′W

- Type: Private online for-profit university subsidiary
- Active: 1937; 89 years ago – 2018; 8 years ago
- Parent institution: Kaplan Higher Education Corporation, Graham Holdings Company
- President: Betty Vandenbosch
- Faculty: Nearly 3,600
- Students: 30,000 online and campus-based students
- Location: Davenport, Iowa, United States (with main administrative building in Fort Lauderdale, Florida)
- Campus: 14 campuses in Indiana, Iowa, Maine, Maryland, Missouri, and Wisconsin and 1 Kaplan University Learning Center in Maryland
- Website: KaplanUniversity.edu

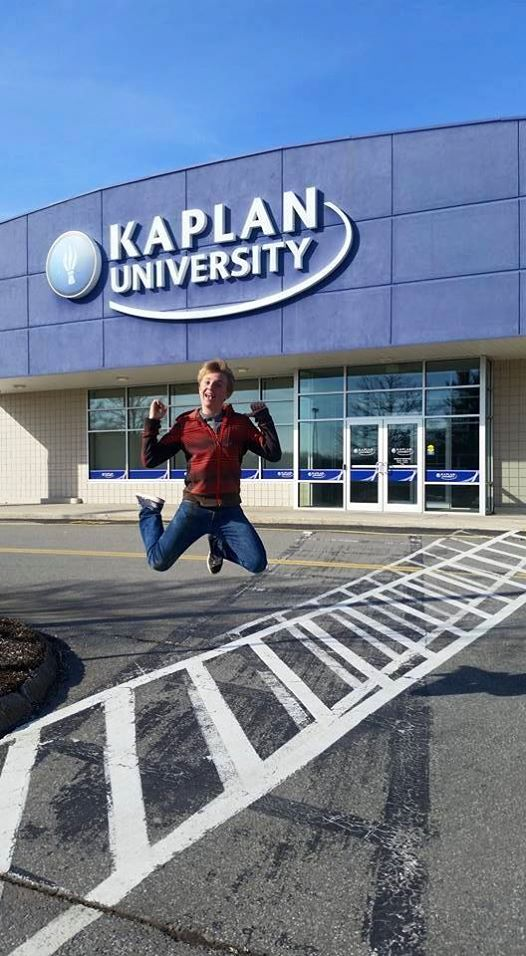
A Kaplan University campus in Maine

Kaplan University (KU) was a private online for-profit university owned by Kaplan, Inc., a subsidiary of Graham Holdings Company. It was predominantly a distance learning institution, maintaining 14 ground locations across the United States. The university was named in honor of Stanley H. Kaplan, who founded Kaplan Test Prep. It was regionally accredited by the Higher Learning Commission, one of seven major accrediting bodies in the U.S., but some programs did not have the field-specific accreditation needed for graduates to obtain certification.

In 2017, Graham sold Kaplan University to Purdue University, with the aim of changing it into a nonprofit online institution now known as Purdue University Global. The acquisition, announced in April 2017, was completed in March 2018.

== History ==
The American Institute of Commerce (AIC) was established in 1937 in Davenport, Iowa as a workforce preparatory school. In 1999, after six decades of growth in Iowa, the U.S. Department of Education selected the school as 1 of 15 to receive a grant that would enable it to offer courses online. Around this time, AIC and four other Iowa colleges were acquired by Quest College and renamed to Quest Education Corporation. In November 2000, Kaplan, Inc. purchased the college, and changed its name to Kaplan College. Beginning in September 2004, Kaplan, Inc. divided its programs into two different offerings: Kaplan University which specialized in online bachelor's and graduate degrees, and Kaplan College, which offered classroom-based instruction and was largely vocational in nature and focused on associate degrees and certificates. In 2015 Kaplan, Inc. sold all 38 Kaplan College campuses to Education Corporation of America. Kaplan College is now known as Brightwood College.

In October 2007, all seven Iowa and Nebraska-based Hamilton College campuses merged with and began operating under the Kaplan University brand.

Concord Law School merged with Kaplan University in October 2007, changing its name to Concord Law School of Kaplan University. The school, established in 1998, was the first fully online law school in the United States. The American Bar Association (ABA) does not accredit online programs but students with non-ABA-accredited law degrees are allowed to take California's bar examination and practice law once admitted to the bar.

=== 2017 purchase by Purdue University ===
Following several years of significant enrollment decline, Graham Holdings sold Kaplan University to the Purdue University system for one dollar in March 2018, who rebranded the institution as Purdue University Global. In exchange, Purdue agreed to employ Kaplan, Inc. as the exclusive provider of nonacademic functions for thirty years, with a six year buyout option, and Kaplan, Inc. agreed to assume responsibility for liabilities resulting before the transaction. According to the contract terms, Kaplan receives 12.5 percent of the university's revenue, as long as funds are available after all operating expenses and guaranteed payments to Purdue have been covered.

== Offerings and admissions ==
The university, which had its main campus in Davenport, Iowa and its headquarters in Chicago, Illinois, was accredited by the Higher Learning Commission. At the time of its acquisition by Purdue, it served approximately 33,000 students: roughly 75% female, 60% over age 30, and 25% who are military affiliated. More than 50% are the first generation in their family to go to college.

Kaplan University had an open admissions policy. Applicants were eligible for both Pell grants and federal student loans. The university offered members of the military discounted tuition rates as well as college credit for some of the military education they may have received while in the service.

== Academics ==
Kaplan University was academically organized into eight schools:

- Business and Information Technology
- Concord Law School
- Education
- Health Sciences
- Nursing
- Open College
- Professional and Continuing Education
- Social and Behavioral Sciences

According to Kaplan's annual academic report, the University awarded more than 12,000 degrees and certificates a year. More than 40 percent of its faculty have a Ph.D.

Many of its offerings relied on competency based education to offer credits to students who can demonstrate they have mastered certain learning outcomes through professional and military training.

The university's school of nursing was awarded a national professional accreditation for its Bachelor of Science in Nursing degree in April 2006 from the Commission on Collegiate Nursing Education (CCNE). The School of Nursing was granted additional programmatic accreditations from the Commission on Collegiate Nursing Education (CCNE) in June 2016, including for its doctoral and master's programs. In addition, its other schools earned programmatic accreditation. For example, Kaplan University's School of Business was granted accreditation by the Accreditation Council for Business Schools and Programs (ACBSP) in 2013.

== Criticisms ==
=== False Claims Act lawsuit ===
On August 17, 2011, the U.S. District Court for the Southern District of Florida issued a series of rulings in three related cases based on the federal False Claims Act. The cases included three separate complaints by three former Kaplan University employees, Messrs. Wilcox, Gillespie, and Diaz. The court dismissed the claims brought by Wilcox in their entirety. (Diaz v. Kaplan Univ., No. 09–20756–civ, 2011 WL 3627285, (S.D.Fla. Aug. 17, 2011)). Wilcox was later, and separately, convicted for making threats against Kaplan employees. (U.S. v. Wilcox, 1:08-cr-00256, U.S. District Court, Northern Division of Illinois (Chicago)). The court also dismissed in part Gillespie's complaint, and, on July 16, 2013, the court entered summary judgment in favor of the company on all remaining claims in the Gillespie complaint. (Diaz v. Kaplan Univ., No. 09–20756–civ, 2011 WL 3627285, (S.D.Fla. July 16, 2013)). Gillespie appealed to the U.S. Court of Appeals for the Eleventh Judicial Circuit and, on March 11, 2015, the appellate court issued a decision affirming the lower court’s dismissal of all of Gillespie's claims. (Urquilla-Diaz v. Kaplan University, No. 13-13672 (11th Cir. 2015)).

On Diaz's compliant, the court dismissed the entire False Claims Act claim and on October 31, 2012, the court entered summary judgment in favor of Kaplan as to the sole remaining employment claim in the Diaz complaint. Kaplan also received a judgment for costs against Diaz based on his frivolous employment claims. (Urquilla-Diaz v. Kaplan University (1:11-cv-23394)). However, Diaz appealed and, on March 11, 2015, the Appellate Court affirmed the dismissal of three of the four Diaz claims, but reversed and remanded on the claim that incentive compensation for admissions representatives was improperly based on enrollment counts. (Urquilla-Diaz v. Kaplan University, No. 13-13672 (11th Cir. 2015)). Kaplan filed an answer to Diaz's amended complaint, and a summary judgment briefing schedule has been set.

On July 7, 2011, the U.S. District Court for the District of Nevada dismissed another False Claims Act case brought by another former employee of a Kaplan nationally accredited campus, Charles Jajdelski, in its entirety and entered a final judgment in favor of Kaplan. The claim found that Jajdelski had failed to present evidence the company received student aid funds for "phantom students". (Jajdelski v. Kaplan, Inc., 834 F. Supp. 2d 1182 (D. Nev. 2011)). Like the other cases, the federal government has repeatedly declined to intervene. On February 13, 2013, the U.S. Circuit Court for the Ninth Judicial Circuit affirmed the dismissal in part and reversed the dismissal on one allegation under the False Claims Act relating to eligibility for Title IV funding based on claims of false attendance. (Charles Jajdelski v. Kaplan. Inc., No. 11-16651 (9th Cir. 2013). The surviving claim was remanded to the District Court, where Kaplan was again granted summary judgment on March 9, 2015. (U.S. ex rel. Jajdelski v. Kaplan, Inc.) The plaintiff appealed, and on March 22, 2017, a Ninth Circuit panel upheld a lower court's ruling in favor of Kaplan.

=== Degree credibility and debt load ===
In 2010 Kaplan and other for-profit education companies came under scrutiny from the U.S. Congress due to concerns that the industry leaves too many students with heavy debts, and with credentials that are of little help in finding jobs. Much of the report focused on Kaplan College programs, which are no longer a part of Kaplan University. Although the report was critical of Kaplan Inc., Senator Tom Harkin, then chair of the investigating committee noted "Kaplan stands alone among the large, for-profit education companies for having taken what are, in my opinion, real and significant steps to reduce high withdrawal rates and high default rates by implementing the Kaplan Commitment program."
