= Scott Belsky =

American entrepreneur

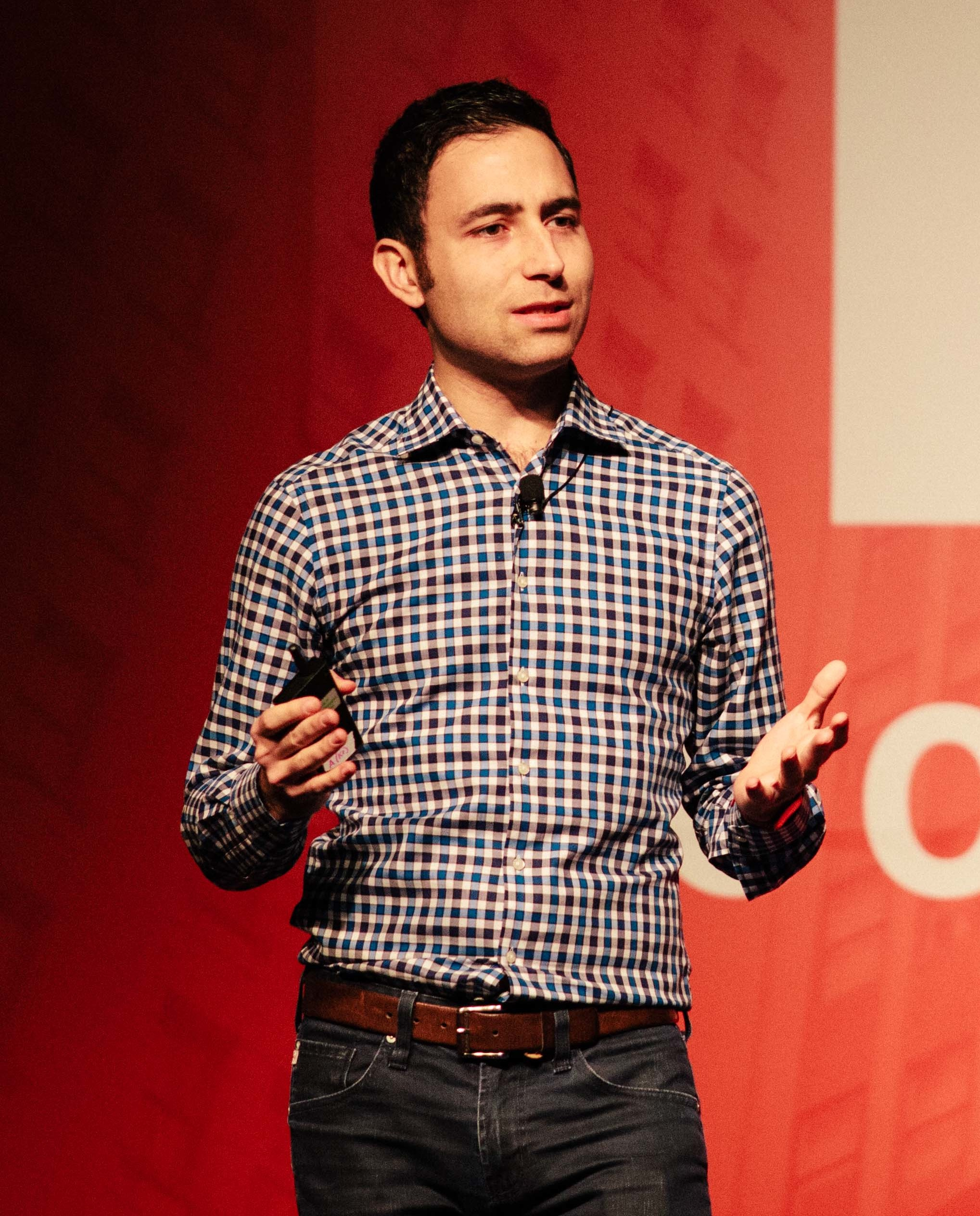
- Belsky in 2014
- Born: 18 April 1980 (age 46)
- Education: Cornell University; Harvard Business School
- Occupations: Entrepreneur, author, investor
- Employer: A24 Films
- Known for: Behance
- Notable work: Making Ideas Happen; The Messy Middle
- Board member of: Cornell University's Entrepreneurship Program; Museum of Modern Art; Coop Careers
- Relatives: Stanley Kaplan
- Website: www.scottbelsky.com

Scott Belsky (born April 18, 1980) is an American entrepreneur, author and early-stage investor. He is best known for making seed investments in companies such as Uber and Pinterest as well as co-creating the design website Behance. His books Making Ideas Happen and The Messy Middle are both national bestselling books.

Belsky currently works as a Partner at A24, overseeing the studio's technology and innovation initiatives, and founded A24 Labs.

== Career ==
In 2010, Belsky was included in Fast Company's "100 Most Creative People in Business" list.

In December 2012, Behance was acquired by Adobe where Belsky became VP of Products, Mobile and Community at Adobe. In February 2016, Belsky left Adobe and joined Benchmark as the firm's sixth general partner. Prior to joining Benchmark, Belsky had been an early-stage investor and active advisor to companies including Uber, Warby Parker, Pinterest, Periscope and Sweetgreen. In 2017, Belsky returned to Adobe as the Chief Product Officer, Executive Vice President for Adobe Creative Cloud. Scott Belsky also serves on the Board of the Atlassian Corporation (NASDAQ: TEAM)

In January 2025, Belsky joined A24's leadership team as a partner, overseeing the studio's technology and innovation initiatives, A24 Films.

=== Notable investments ===
Belsky’s notable seed investments include: Airtable, Meter, Pinterest, Ramp, Sweetgreen, Uber and Warby Parker. In 2025, Belsky was listed on Business Insider’s “Best Early-Stage Investors” list and was included as one of the industry’s top angel investors.

== Personal life and education ==
Belsky graduated from Cornell University. He received his MBA from Harvard Business School. Belsky serves on the advisory board of Cornell University's Entrepreneurship Program, and is a board member at the Museum of Modern Art and Coop Careers. Belsky is the grandson of Stanley Kaplan.

== Books ==
- Making Ideas Happen, Penguin Group, 2010 ISBN 978-1591844112
- The Messy Middle: Finding Your Way Through the Hardest and Most Crucial Part of Any Bold Venture, Penguin Group, 2018 ISBN 978-0735218079

Making Ideas Happen and The Messy Middle are both national bestselling books. Belsky also has a chapter giving advice in Tim Ferriss' book Tools of Titans.
