= The Ring of McAllister =

2003 mystery novel and SAT preparatory book

- Author: Robert Marantz
- Publication date: 2003
- ISBN: 0-7432-3520-7

The Ring of McAllister: A Score-Raising Mystery Featuring 1,046 Must-Know SAT Vocabulary Words is a mystery novel and SAT preparatory book written by Robert Marantz and published by Kaplan, Inc.

== Plot ==
Will Lassiter is a seventeen-year-old who lives in the town of Red Fork. When his neighbor, Dr. Octavio Perez, vanishes from the mysterious Stone Manor, Lassiter becomes enveloped in a mystery that involves the late Algernon McAllister, a well-known patron of the town. The protagonist locates Perez, rescues his daughter, and discovers the secret of the abandoned mansion.

== Author ==
The author, Robert Marantz, graduated from Cornell University with a Bachelors of Arts in English. He previously worked at Kaplan as a software developer, but left the company to work as a screenwriter. He intended for the book, which was published jointly by Kaplan and Simon & Schuster, to be "a light entertainment" and "[s]omething that [wasn’t] a chore to read".

== SAT preparation ==
The 329-page novel contains 1,046 vocabulary words that test-takers are likely to encounter on the SAT, the most frequently used college admissions exam in the United States. Each word is boldfaced in the text and defined in a glossary at the end of the book. The novel is intended to teach students the meanings of the words in context in a way that engages readers, thereby improving students' performance on the SAT's verbal section. The Ring of McAllister followed several other fictional test-prep books, including Harcourt's Tooth and Nail (1994) and Barron's Simon's Saga (2002).

== Critical response ==
Readers' reactions to The Ring of McAllister varied: one praised it as "a brilliant way to learn SAT vocabulary", while another quipped that "after about 50 pages, you might actually find a word you didn't know". The Chicago Tribune called the book "a decent read", commenting that although its boldfaced words were "a bit jarring", reading the novel was a more enjoyable way to study for the SAT than "nodding off over a boring vocab list". A reviewer in the Spokesman-Review gave the book a grade of D, deriding its "plot and writing style" as "juvenile" and opining that "your time is valuable and better spent the old-fashioned way—memorizing flashcards".
