= Andrew Rosen =

Andrew Rosen may refer to:

- Andrew S. Rosen, American chairman of Kaplan, Inc.
- Andrew Rosen (retail executive), American C.E.O. of Theory, Inc.
