= Senator Diers =

Senator Diers may refer to:

- Theodore C. Diers (1880–1942), Wyoming State Senate
- William H. Diers (1890–1982), Nebraska State Senate
