= Social Reader =

Social news reading applications

"Social Reader" may refer to the Washington Post Social Reader (formerly available at socialreader.com), or may be used to describe a more general category of social news reading applications.

== List of popular Social Readers ==
=== Google Reader ===
While not advertised as a "social reader," Google Reader was an RSS reader with social features, including sharing of articles with friends with personal commentary.

=== Washington Post Social Reader ===
The Washington Post's WaPo Labs team launched Washington Post Social Reader for Facebook on September 22, 2011. On January 22, 2014 Social Reader was rebranded as Trove and launched a new app for iPhone and iPad.

=== Guardian Social Reader ===
The Guardian was the next major news publishing portal that joined the race. Guardian Social Reader was announced on Friday 23 September 2011. As the ground was already set by Washington Post Social Reader, it took The Guardian a very small time to reach its audience on Facebook. Within the six months of the launch of application, the monthly active users for Guardian Social Reader have reached a figure of 5.9 million, with more than 2.9 million joining in the first two months of 2012. The Guardian has also launched the same reader application for smartphones, including Android, iPhone and iPad.

== Falling popularity ==
In May 2012, it was observed that the popularity of Social Reader apps had fallen considerably since they were introduced. The Washington Post Social Reader, having once had 17 million monthly users, had fallen below 10 million, and The Guardian, having once had almost 600,000 users a day, had fallen below 100,000. This is thought to have been caused by a change in how Facebook displayed social reader information. "The initial drop was largely the result of a change in the way Facebook displayed social reader stories, which collapsed stories into a smaller, cycling module (the first social readers spit long lists of stories onto users' walls, which was both clumsy and widely reviled)."
