= Hamilton College (Iowa) =

Coordinates: 41°56′58.30″N 91°42′48.76″W

Iowa College Acquisition Corporation (dba Hamilton College)
- Type: For-Profit
- Location: Cedar Rapids, Iowa, U.S.
- Campus: Office building
- Colors: Blue and white
- Nickname: Huskies
- Mascots: Shammy, the Husky
- Website: www.hamiltonia.edu

Hamilton College was the DBA name of the Iowa College Acquisition Corporation, a company that owns and operates independent for-profit colleges. Hamilton College had seven campuses in Iowa and Nebraska. Iowa College Acquisition Corporation is owned and operated by Kaplan Higher Education, a subsidiary of the Washington Post Company. This is not to be confused with Hamilton Technical College that was founded by Maryanne Hamilton and operates in Davenport, Iowa.

Hamilton College was originally established by Ward Hamilton in Mason City, Iowa, in 1900 as a business school. This makes it the oldest continuously operating college in the state of Iowa specializing in business education. In 1980, Hamilton opened a campus in Cedar Rapids. A third campus was established in Des Moines in 1988.

In 1998, Hamilton College was purchased by Quest Education Corporation, which was acquired in 2000 by Kaplan, Inc. and renamed Kaplan Higher Education Corporation. Shortly thereafter the Nebraska College of Business and the Lincoln School of Commerce, also owned by Quest, were renamed Hamilton College-Omaha and Hamilton College-Lincoln respectively. Hamilton College continued to expand, adding campuses in Cedar Falls in 2000 and Council Bluffs in 2004.

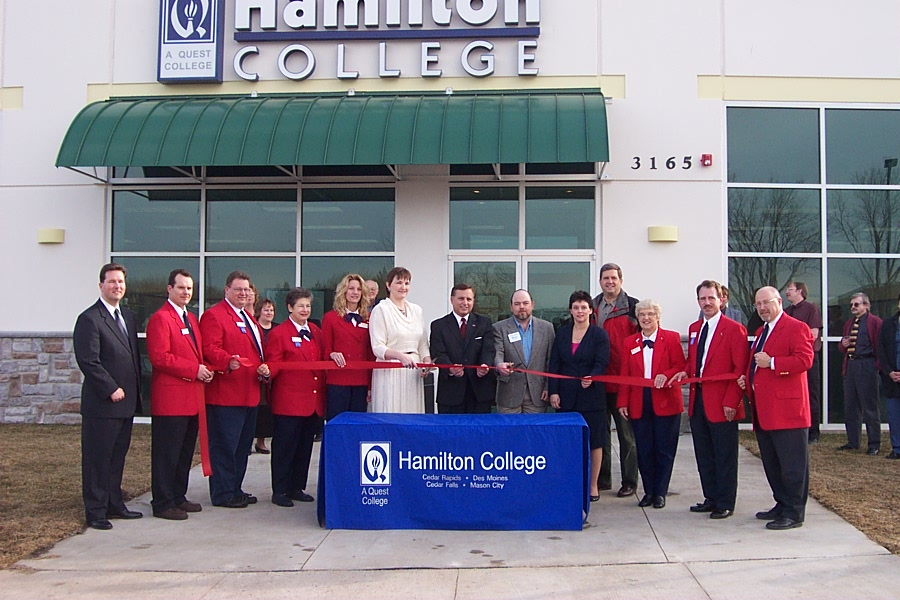
Ribbon-Cutting Ceremony at Cedar Rapids campus - March 12, 2002

In November 2007, Hamilton College officially changed its name to Kaplan University.

== Athletics ==
Hamilton students occasionally participated in recreational (bar-league) softball and volleyball. At the Lincoln campus, formerly the Lincoln Business College, there was a basketball team named the Hamilton Aliens.

== Notable alumni ==
- Louis Boisot, Jr. (1856–1933), lawyer
- Leo Elthon (1898–1967), Governor of Iowa 1954–1955
