= Behance =

Design website

- Available in: English
- Owner: Adobe Inc.
- Founders: Matias Corea and Scott Belsky
- Key people: Scott Belsky; Will Allen; Zach McCullough
- Website: www.behance.net
- IPv6 support: No
- Commercial: Yes
- Registration: Optional (Note: Registration is required for certain tasks.)
- Users: 56,000,000+
- Launched: November 6, 2005; 21 years ago

Behance, stylized as Bēhance, is a creative networking site. Owned by Adobe since 2012, its main focus is to showcase and discover creative work.

Behance was founded by Matias Corea and Scott Belsky in November 2005. It was acquired by Adobe in December 2012. As of December 2024, Behance had over 56 million members.

== History ==
Behance was conceived as a way for creative professionals to showcase their work and connect with potential employers and clients. Co-founder Scott Belsky said the idea grew in part from observing companies recruit creative employees using conventional résumés, which he considered poorly suited to demonstrating creative ability. Belsky and graphic designer Matias Corea developed the service as an online professional network centered on portfolios and creative work. The platform began with a small invitation-only community of about 200 designers before expanding more broadly.

The company initially relied on revenue generated by selling banner ads, job postings and 99U conference tickets. In May 2012, its first round of outside funding received $6.5 million from investors, including Dave McClure and Jeff Bezos's personal investment firm, Bezos Expeditions.

The company was acquired by Adobe Systems for $150 million in December 2012.

In 2021, Behance added a subscription feature for users to sell their tutorials and other services. It also added crypto wallet integration.

== Corporate affairs ==
=== Products ===
Users can sign up to Behance and build profiles consisting of projects. Both registered and unregistered users can view any particular project, as well as comment on them. Members of Behance can follow other users' profiles. Co-founder Belsky compared the first version of Behance's online portfolios with "project" structures as providing an organised art showcase, in comparison to DeviantArt and Saatchi's digital community.

==== Adobe Portfolio ====
Adobe Portfolio (formerly ProSite) is Behance's DIY web design application, similar to popular tools such as Weebly and Joomla. It is a personal portfolio site creation tool on the web and it syncs with a user's Behance project. Adobe Portfolio can only be accessed by buying an Adobe Creative Cloud subscription.

==== Served sites ====
Content from the Behance Network gets fed into a network of sites called the Served sites, which display work in specific categories such as fashion, industrial design, and typography. In September 2010, more were added, including branding, digital art and toy design. In April 2012, advertising, art, architecture and more were added as categories.

==== Action Method ====
Action Method is a productivity methodology targeting creative professionals. It includes a line of paper products (since 2014 sold by The Ghostly Store rather than Behance itself) and an online application called Action Method Online (although this was discontinued 1 June 2014). Its purpose is to connect every event with a set of specific tasks which the user can perform, called action steps.

==== 99U ====
99U is a consulting service and annual conference in New York City that focuses on marketing, but it also covers subjects including leadership, teamwork, and productivity. The conference was a initially hosted by Behance before Adobe acquired it. Attendees are known as "fellows," and the name "99U" comes from the Thomas Edison quote that, "Genius is 1% inspiration, 99% perspiration".

In 2011, 99U won a Webby Award for "Best Cultural Blog." In 2019, Adobe presented 99U as its 11th annual gathering on May 2019 with 1,000 registration tickets.

== Awards ==
- 2009 Webby Award Finalist (The Behance Network) – Self-Promotion/Portfolio Category
- 2009 Silicon Alley Insider Award Finalist – Most Loved Product or Service
- 2011 Webby Award Winner (The 99%) – Best Cultural Blog
- 2017 Webby Award Winner (Behance) – Community

== Criticism ==
Adobe's acquisition of Behance in 2012 prompted concerns that the company would start monitoring the activity of its users, which may limit users' trust in the site.

Studies on Behance user demographics show that male users on Behance outnumber female users by more than two to one. This contrasts with the gender demographics of Pinterest, where female users are the dominant majority, making up 90% of the user numbers. While male and female Behance users created about the same number of projects, men tended to have a greater number of followers and receive more likes for their projects.

== See also ==
- Creative Cloud controversy
- Adobe Systems
- Adweek
- AIGA
- Core77
- D&AD
