= Trove (app) =

Former social news mobile application

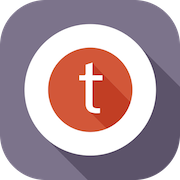
- Website type: social network news aggregator
- Headquarters: Washington, D.C.
- Key people: Vijay Ravindran (CEO)
- Website: trove.com (archived)
- Launched: January 2014; 12 years ago

Trove was a social news aggregation web and mobile application, with apps available on iOS, Android, and Fire Phone. Trove is also the name of the company behind the application, which was owned by Graham Holdings.

Trove was shut down in December 2015.

== Usage and features ==
Trove was a free social news discovery and sharing platform where users connect with others through shared topical interests. Users can curate personalized newsfeeds based on their interests, called troves. Users then "pick" the best stories to share with their followers both on Trove and other social media sites. Users could follow a trove to see those picks on their home page.

Smartpick

In January 2015, Trove added a "Smartpick" capability. When enabled, any relevant articles posted to a user's Twitter account will be categorized and picked on Trove automatically.

Conversations

In October 2015, Trove launched "conversations", which enables curators to engage their following in a discussion about a particular pick.

== History ==
In 2009, Washington Post Labs (WaPo Labs) was created as the digital innovation and technology team of The Washington Post Company. In 2010, The Washington Post Company acquired iCurrent, a personalized news and information service that became the basis for the company's news application. In August 2013, after Amazon CEO Jeff Bezos bought The Washington Post Company's newspaper division, WaPo Labs was formally renamed Trove. Trove remained part of the parent company, which was renamed Graham Holdings Company.

Graham Holdings Chief Digital Officer Vijay Ravindran is Trove's CEO. Headquarters are in Washington, D.C., with a second office in San Francisco.

In December 2015, Trove was shut down after being integrated with SocialCode.

== Product evolution ==
Trove's First Launch
In April 2011, the first iteration of Trove was launched as a personalized news web application.

Washington Post Social Reader
In September 2011, the WaPo Labs team optimized the web application for Facebook and launched Washington Post Social Reader, one of the first social news applications to leverage Facebook's Open Graph technology. Social Reader had 17 million monthly users at its peak. iCurrent powered the personalization technology behind Social Reader.

Trove's Relaunch and Platform Releases
In January 2014, Trove relaunched as an iOS and web application. The New York Times called Trove, "a treasure for news junkies." CNBC called Trove, "a Pinterest board for news." USA Today and The Today Show have also given positive reviews.

Trove launched on the Android platform in July 2014.

Trove also offered integration with Amazon's Fire Phone,Apple Watch, and Amazon Echo.
