= Cable One =

American cable company

Cable One, Inc.
- Type: Public
- Traded as: NYSE: CABO
- Industry: Cable TV, broadband phone, Internet, Fiber Services
- Founded: 1986; 40 years ago (as Post-Newsweek Cable); 1997; 29 years ago (Cable One)
- Headquarters: Phoenix, Arizona, U.S.
- Key people: Jim Holanda (CEO, chairperson, president); Kenneth Johnson (COO); Todd Koetje (CFO)
- Products: Cable television; Internet; broadband phone; Fiber Services
- Revenue: ▲US$1.706 billion (2022)
- Operating income: ▲US$538.989 million (2022)
- Net income: ▼US$234.118 million (2022)
- Total assets: ▼US$6.914 billion (2022)
- Total equity: ▼US$1.758 billion (2022)
- Owner: Graham family - 12%
- Number of employees: ▼3,132 (December, 2022)
- Website: cableone.biz

Sparklight logo

Cable One, Inc. is an American broadband communications provider. Under the Sparklight brand, it provides cable television, internet, and phone services to 24 U.S. states and 1.1 million residential and business customers. It also owns the Fidelity Communications brand, which provides the same services in Arkansas, Louisiana, Missouri, Oklahoma, and Texas. Fidelity was founded in 1940. It is headquartered in Phoenix, Arizona, though it does not serve that metro area.

== History ==
Originally established in 1986 as a subsidiary of the Washington Post Company (now Graham Holdings Company) known as Post-Newsweek Cable, its name was changed to Cable One in 1997.

In June 2015, Graham Holdings Company distributed 100% of Cable One’s common stock to GHC shareholders in a tax-free transaction. Cable One became an independent publicly traded company as Cable One, Inc. and began trading on the New York Stock Exchange under the ticker symbol CABO.

In summer 2019, Cable One rebranded its residential services division as Sparklight, seeking to promote its internet services more than cable TV offerings. Equipment with Cable One branding is still used by existing customers, with new customers receiving equipment with Sparklight branding. Cable One's original URL, cableone.net, redirects to sparklight.com.

Sparklight provides broadband service via cable (DOCSIS) through most of its footprint, and fiber-to-the-home in limited areas.

Sparklight provides phone service plans such as Economy Phone, Standard Phone, and Elite Package with Starter Plan Plus.

Sparklight offers three cable TV plans: Economy Cable TV, Standard Cable TV, and Elite 100 Plus. Cable TV can also be accessed on Apple iPhone, Android, Windows, Roku, Xbox One, Xbox 360, and Nook through Sparklight's TV Everywhere service. Sparklight offers a Digital Value Pack which includes channels such as Red Zone, HBO, and Showtime as add-ons. Cable channels owned by Paramount Global that were owned by Viacom before the merger with CBS Corporation that formed Paramount are notably absent from Cable One's lineup after 2014 due to disagreements between Viacom and Cable One.

In 2020, Cable One announced a new IPTV-based service, Sparklight TV, which was made available to many areas throughout 2021. Existing cable customers are not yet required to transfer to Sparklight TV, but cable through a cable box is no longer offered to new customers.

In 2026, Cable One agreed to acquire the remaining 55% stake in Mega Broadband Investment Holdings, LLC it did not own. On October 9, 2026, CoBank, ACB was granted a temporary restraining order prohibiting Cable One from completing the acquisition.
