= Quest Education Corporation =

American for-profit educational company

Quest Education Corporation was a for-profit educational company in the United States, based in Georgia, which was acquired by Kaplan, Inc. in 2000 to become the "Kaplan Higher Education" division of that company.

== History ==
Quest was founded by Gary D. Kerber in 1988 as Educational Medical, Inc., and started up by acquiring seven schools in 1988 and 1989 focused on health care education. Over time Quest began acquiring schools in different fields and in other U.S. states. In September 1998, the company changed its name to Quest Education Corporation.

In 1998, it acquired five Iowa colleges, including three branches of Hamilton College in Iowa, and American Institute of Commerce schools in Cedar Falls, Iowa and Davenport, Iowa

At the time it was acquired by Kaplan in July 2000, Quest had 30 schools in 11 U.S. states.

In October 2007, Kaplan renamed a number of former Quest assets under the Kaplan University name. In 2017, Kaplan University was sold to Purdue University, with the aim of changing it into a nonprofit online institution now known as Purdue University Global.
