= Jonathan Grayer =

American businessman (born 1964)

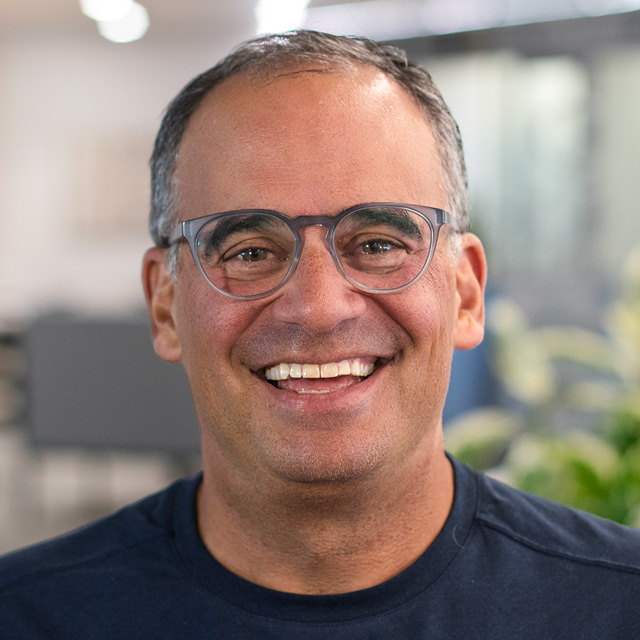
- Born: December 17, 1964 (age 61); Brooklyn, New York, U.S.
- Occupations: CEO of Imagine Learning. Former Chairman and CEO of Kaplan, Inc.
- Known for: Global expansion and diversification of Kaplan, Inc. from 1994-2008

Jonathan Grayer is the founder and CEO of Imagine Learning, an education company that provides curriculum and learning solutions to more than 18 million students annually in over half of U.S. school districts. Under Grayer’s leadership, the company has grown into one of the nation’s largest providers of curriculum, assessment, intervention, courseware, and instructional services for pre-K–12 schools. Grayer founded the company in January 2010 as a partnership with Kohlberg Kravis Roberts (KKR). In January 2018, the company announced a new strategic partnership with Silver Lake Partners. Grayer previously served as the chairman and CEO of Kaplan, Inc., a global education company and test prep provider that has been owned by Graham Holdings Company (formerly the Washington Post Company) since 1984. Grayer, named CEO in 1994, grew Kaplan's revenues from $80 million to $2.3 billion by the time he retired from the company in 2008.

== Early Life ==
Jonathan was born on December 17, 1964 in Brooklyn, NY. He is the eldest son of Fern and David Grayer. His father, a gastroenterologist, was a medical intern at the time. His mother went on to become a therapist and college administrator. Jonathan grew up in Westport, CT where he attended Staples High School, playing basketball and tennis there. He went on to Harvard where he graduated magna cum laude with an A.B. in History from Harvard College in 1986 and earned an M.B.A. from Harvard Business School.

== Kaplan ==
In the summer after his first year at HBS, he interned in corporate development at The Washington Post Company. After completing business school in 1990, he joined Newsweek, where he later became director of marketing. That same year, Grayer joined Kaplan as regional operations director and held several leadership roles before becoming president and CEO in 1994. He was named chairman and CEO in 2002.(The Washingtonian, June 2005)

When Grayer first became CEO of Kaplan in 1994, the company was an $80 million test preparation business. Through a series of strategic acquisitions that brought Kaplan into the higher education and professional training markets, he was able to diversify Kaplan into a company that provides lifelong learning and had more than $2 billion in revenue in 2007.

In 2004, BusinessWeek named Grayer one of the best managers of the year for his leadership in establishing Kaplan as The Washington Post Company’s "financial crown jewel". The company’s growth under his leadership has been reported on by other national and international media, including Fortune, Forbes, The Wall Street Journal, and the Financial Times. On November 19, 2008, Grayer announced his resignation from Kaplan, stating that he plans to pursue "entrepreneurial activity, investment and philanthropy".

== Weld North ==
Grayer founded Weld North in 2010 in partnership with KKR to invest in education, health and wellness, media, marketing, and consumer services companies. Since its founding, Weld North has made over 50 investments in growth-stage companies.

=== Imagine Learning ===
In the K-12 industry segment, Weld North operates its platform Imagine Learning:

- Edgenuity, an Arizona-based 6th–12th grade educational technology and curriculum company, which was acquired in July 2011;
  - Compass Learning, a Texas-based digital curriculum company, acquired in July 2016;
  - Glynlyon, an Arizona-based provider of digital curriculum, acquired in March 2019;
  - LearnZillion, a Washington, D.C.–based provider of digital core curriculum, acquired in December 2019;
  - Purpose Prep, a Michigan-based provider of Social Emotional Learning curriculum, acquired in June 2020;
- Imagine Learning, a Utah-based English language learning company, which was acquired in April 2014;
  - Assessment Technology, Inc., an Arizona-based educational measurement market leader in K-12 online assessment;
- BookheadEd Learning, a California-based developer of engaging and effective digital-first curriculum, including the award-winning StudySync, a comprehensive English Language Arts (ELA) program for grades 6-12, acquired in December 2020;
- Twig Education, a UK-based provider of high-quality science curriculum products designed to improve science literacy globally, acquired in July 2021. Twig’s flagship product, Twig Science Next Gen, is a highly engaging, multimedia-rich, digital-first science program, grounded in the Next Generation Science Standards (NGSS);
- Robotify, an Ireland-based provider of engaging coding and virtual robotics curriculum, acquired in November 2021.;
- Wayside Publishing, a leading provider of world language curriculum and language-learning solutions, acquired in July 2026.;

In January 2018, Weld North announced it had sold KKR's stake in Weld North Education to Silver Lake Partners. In February 2021, Onex agreed to make a significant investment in Weld North Education.

=== Other investments ===
- In February 2018, Weld North sold its investment in Performance Matters, a Utah-based K-12 data analytics company, to PeopleAdmin, a Vista Equity Partners portfolio company.
- In November 2018, Weld North sold The Learning House, a Kentucky-based service provider to over 100 higher education institutions, to John Wiley & Sons.
- In January 2016, Weld North acquired a controlling interest in Boston-based learning analytics company Intellify Learning.

Grayer is a frequent speaker on education reform, investing, and innovation. Grayer was named EdTech GOAT by GSV in 2025.

== Other roles ==
Grayer serves on the board of Memorial Sloan-Kettering Cancer Center. In September 2005, he was named by U.S. Secretary of Education Margaret Spellings to the Commission on the Future of Higher Education.

In June 2016, The Kaplan Educational Foundation honored Grayer with the 2016 Leadership Award in recognition of his role as founder of the foundation when he was CEO of Kaplan, Inc. The Kaplan Educational Foundation, founded in 2006, helps disadvantaged Black and Latino community college students complete their associate degrees and transfer to top U.S. colleges and universities.

=== Grayer Family Foundation ===
In 2019, Grayer launched The Grayer Family Foundation to target three areas of need: to provide financial support for cancer care and research, to increase access to higher education for under-resourced students, and to create more nutritional options for underprivileged kids before and after school.

=== Imagine Learning Foundation ===
In 2021, Grayer launched the Imagine Learning Foundation, created with one principal goal: to foster the well-being of learners and the people who support them at home and in their communities. Imagine Learning Foundation funds a variety of grants to mission-aligned national nonprofit organizations that support initiatives to foster the well-being of youth, families, and educators with an emphasis on accelerating student achievement.

== Personal life ==
Jonathan is a resident of Hillsboro Beach, FL, where his partner, Dawn Baker Miller, is the mayor. He has four children — two daughters and two sons. Dawn has a daughter and son.
