= Meter (company) =

American network as a service company

- Industry: Networking hardware, Information technology
- Founded: 2015
- Founders: Sunil and Anil Varanasi
- Headquarters: San Francisco, California
- Website: www.meter.com

Meter is an American technology company that provides internet infrastructure for businesses. Headquartered in San Francisco, it was founded by Sunil and Anil Varanasi in 2015 to build secure enterprise-grade networks.

The computer networking company provides “all-in-one” services for networking hardware, software, and support that can be maintained remotely. The company makes its own enterprise networking hardware, which includes firewalls, network switches, and access points.

Meter launched its AI tool, "Command", in August 2024. The following year, it announced a partnership with Lumen Technologies to develop Meter's core enterprise networking offering, adding WAN and LAN circuit ordering and management to its platform. As of 2025, Meter is valued at over $1 billion.
