= Theodore C. Diers =

American actor, politician, and writer (1880–1942)

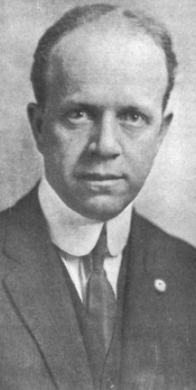

Member of the Wyoming Senate
- In office 1915–1919
- Preceded by: John B. Kendrick

Member of the Wyoming House of Representatives
- In office 1913–1915

Personal details
- Born: Theodore Carl Diers; December 4, 1880 Seward, Nebraska, U.S.
- Died: December 11, 1942 (aged 62) Lincoln, Nebraska, U.S.
- Resting place: Exeter Cemetery, Exeter, Nebraska, U.S.
- Party: Democratic
- Spouse: Sylvia Jeanette Cole (m. 1929; died 1942)
- Education: Lincoln Business College; Chicago Musical College; University of Nebraska

Theodore Carl Diers (December 4, 1880 – December 11, 1942) was an American actor, politician, and writer who served in the Wyoming House of Representatives and Wyoming Senate as a member of the Democratic Party.

== Early life ==
Theodore Carl Diers was born in Seward, Nebraska, to Herman Diers and Anna Schulte on December 4, 1880, and was educated in Seward public schools. In 1897, he graduated from the Lincoln Business College and became a bookkeeper at the First National Bank of Seward. In 1902, he went to New York to become an actor and attended the Chicago Musical College and while in Chicago he studied vocals under Oscar Saenger and piano under Rudolph Ganz. In 1909, he moved to Clearmont, Wyoming and became a cashier at the Clearmont State Bank until 1910, when he became a cashier at the Citizens' State Bank of Sheridan. In 1911, he became the president of the Clearmont State Bank. In 1931, he received a BFA degree from the University of Nebraska.

== Career ==
=== Politics ===
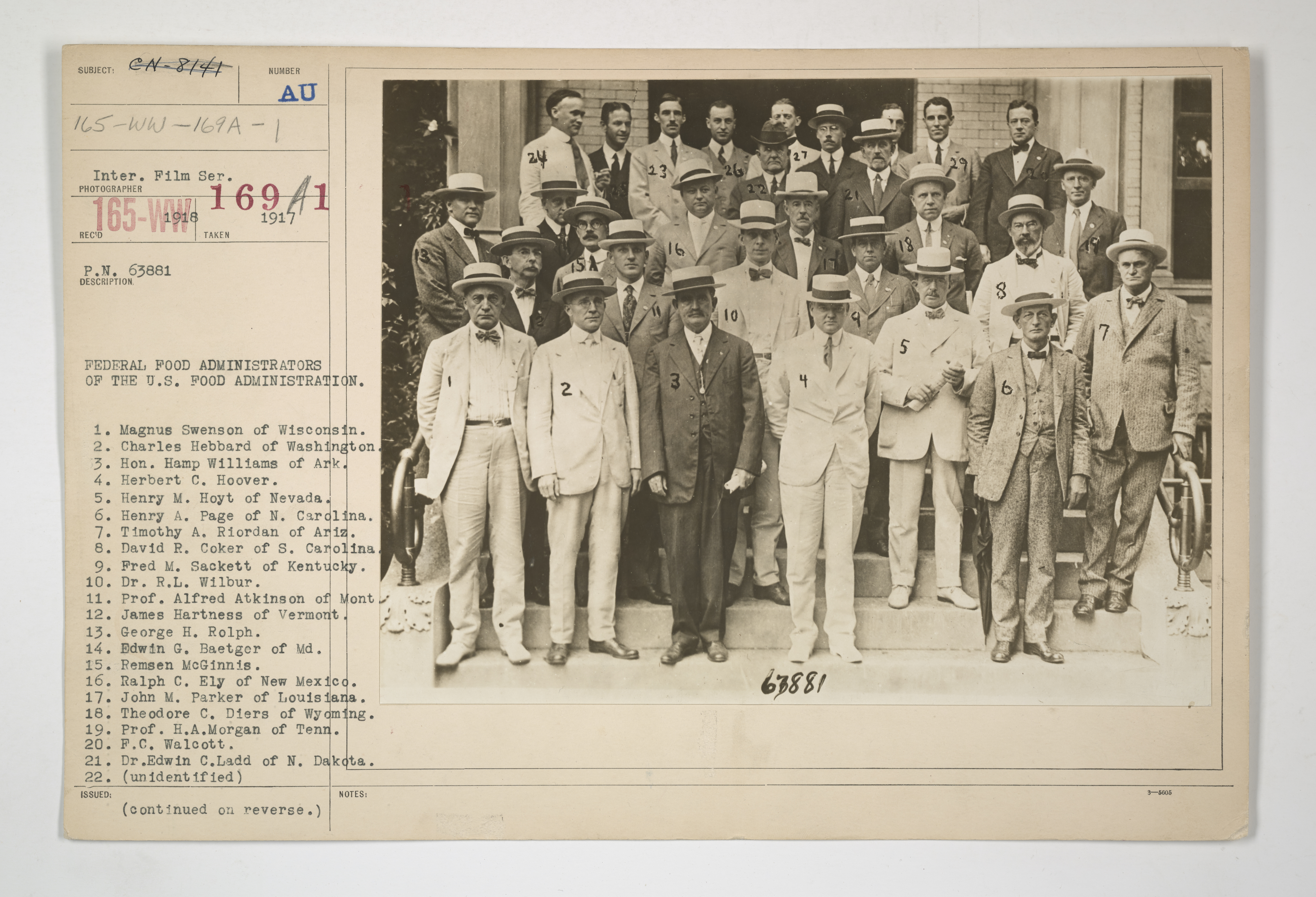
Theodore Carl Diers with other Federal Food Administrators and Director of the United States Food Administration Herbert Hoover

During World War I he served as the Federal Food Administrator for Wyoming. From 1913 to 1915, he served in the Wyoming House of Representatives. Diers then served in the Wyoming Senate from 1915 to 1919, to succeed John B. Kendrick, who was elected as governor, and was a member of the Mines and Mineral Products, Sanitary and Medical Affairs, Railroads and Transpiration, and Judiciary committees. In 1920, he served as the chairman of the Wyoming Democratic Party's state convention and was a member of the resolutions committee at the 1920 Democratic National Convention.

=== Music ===
In 1924, he joined the staff of Transylvania University. In 1925, he became the radio director for the University of Nebraska and in 1932, became the supervisor of the university's music division and served in both positions until November 30, 1940, when he resigned to become the Nebraska Federal Music Project music supervisor. In 1929, he became the secretary of the Nebraska Writers Guild and served until 1940.

== Death ==
On December 11, 1942, he died at his home in Lincoln, Nebraska from a heart attack and following his death "A Prayer for Peace", one of his unpublished songs, was sung by Carl Schaefer at his funeral.
