= Purdue Global Law School =

Public online law school in Los Angeles, California

- Parent school: Purdue University Global; Purdue University system
- Established: 1998; 28 years ago previously Concord Law School; Concord University School of Law
- School type: Public online law school.
- Dean: Martin Pritikin
- Location: Los Angeles, California, US; West Lafayette, Indiana, US
- Enrollment: 830 (2023)
- Faculty: 8 (FT), 52 (PT)
- USNWR ranking: Unranked
- Bar pass rate: 62% (February 2023 first-time takers)
- Website: www.purduegloballawschool.edu

Purdue Global Law School (formerly Concord Law School and Concord University School of Law), is an online law school based in Los Angeles, California. It is one of several schools within Purdue University Global. Established in 1998, Purdue Global Law is a fully online law school. The school is accredited by the State Bar of California. It is not accredited by the American Bar Association, providing limitations in taking the bar exam in most states other than California, Connecticut, and Indiana.

== History ==
Purdue Global Law School began as Concord Law School which, in October 1998, enrolled 33 students began the online program. Concord hired Barry Currier from 2004 to 2010 as Dean of the law school. The merger of Concord into Kaplan University in late 2007 made Concord the first online law school to be part of a regionally accredited university. As a fully online law school, the concept of Concord initially drew criticism from the legal establishment, including U.S. Supreme Court Justice Ruth Bader Ginsburg. In June 2016, Harvard Law School graduate and Whittier Law School professor Martin Pritikin joined Concord Law as its dean. In March 2018, Purdue University bought Kaplan University to make a nonprofit institution and a new online university called Purdue University Global. The for-profit Kaplan Higher Education still has a 30-year contract to serve Purdue Global. After an initial enrollment decline at Purdue Global Law by approximately 65 percent between 2014 and 2020, the school's enrollment has grown after earning California Bar Accreditation in 2020.

It officially adopted its current name in November 2023.

== Admissions ==
Applicants must submit an LSAT, GRE, or JD-NEXT score. For the 2022–23 report, approximately 58% of test takers were disqualified from applying for failure to meet the required minimum test score. For the period ending September 15, 2024, there were 422 applicants of which 406 were admitted (a 96.21% admissions rate) with 394 enrolling. The median undergraduate GPA of enrollees was 3.06. Their 25th/75th percentile GPAs were 2.67/3.49.

== Student body ==
As of September 2023, Purdue Law had approximately 830 students. In 2020, ~65% of students were in the JD bar-qualifying program and ~35% of students were in the non-qualifying Executive JD program.

According to the California Committee of Bar Examiners, Purdue Law has "'significant attrition with voluntary withdrawals of up to 45% and involuntary dismissals of up to 35% in the first semester." For the period of 2021 through September 15, 2024, 778 students did not remain enrolled, either voluntarily, involuntarily, or due to transfer.

== Accreditation status ==
In August 2020, Purdue Global Law received approval by the Committee of Bar Examiners of the State Bar of California, allowing JD graduates to immediately take the California and Connecticut bar exams and, if there is an approval of a petition for a waiver, the Indiana bar exam. Graduates of Purdue Global Law are eligible to take the bar examination in two states (Wisconsin and North Carolina) immediately upon receiving their law license in California. For 19 other U.S jurisdictions, Purdue Global Law graduates are eligible for practice after a certain number of years of licensed practice has been reached. In 31 other jurisdictions a Purdue Global Law graduate is not typically eligible for licensure. Some states (Georgia, Iowa, Maryland, Michigan, and Texas) will allow a Purdue Global Law graduate to be licensed under limited circumstances. Purdue University Global is accredited by Higher Learning Commission.

== Bar pass rate ==
Purdue Global Law graduates' bar pass rate for the February 2023 California bar exam was 62% for first-time takers and 25% for those repeating the exam. Purdue Global Law graduates' first-time takers exceeded both California's all first-time bar exam takers (45%) and American Bar Association (ABA) accredited law school graduates' (49%) bar passage rates. All five Purdue Global Law School graduates taking the Indiana bar exam in February 2025 passed, achieving a 100% first-time taker pass rate compared to Indiana’s 63% overall pass rate for first-time takers. This was the first Indiana bar exam that Purdue Global Law graduates could sit for.

== Rankings ==
Purdue Global Law is listed as one of 29 best online J.D. Programs according to the Princeton Review. Purdue Global Law is not ranked by the U.S. News & World Report.

== Employment ==
Of the 160 schools that reported their gainful employment numbers, Purdue Global Law was too small to have its gainful employment rate (GEE) published by the Texas Public Policy Foundation. However, in 2024, according to Purdue Global Law's own survey (that had a 50% response rate), 42% of responding graduates (12 responding) had obtained employment where a Juris Doctor degree was required. Salaries and positions were not reported.

== Faculty ==
As of August 18, 2026, Purdue Global Law lists 95 faculty, including five deans and eleven professors, the remainder being adjunct professors.

== Degrees offered and cost ==
Purdue Global Law offers two degrees, the law degree, Juris Doctor (JD), and the Executive Juris Doctor (EJD) degree that does not qualify for admission to practice law. Recipients of the JD degree who pass the California Bar Examination and otherwise meet the California State Bar requirements are admitted to the bar and can practice law in California. California bar licensees may practice in most federal courts outside of California and may work as in-house counsel in out-of-state corporations, among other roles.

The JD program is a 92-unit, four-year program, which has a total estimated cost of $56,440. Students are required to complete at least 22-24 units of coursework between 48 and 52 consecutive weeks each year. Graduates of this program meet the legal education requirement of the Committee of Bar Examiners of the State Bar of California and may apply for admission to the State Bar of California.

The EJD is a 72-unit, three-year program. Recipients of this degree are not eligible to take the bar examination. The EJD degree is intended for professionals who want to gain legal skills for careers in arbitration, contracts, policy, governance, privacy, and regulatory areas without becoming an attorney. The degree stirred controversy, with Buzzfeed News reporting that students were misled into thinking the degree would allow them to practice as attorneys. Higher education experts raised concerns about the value of the degree, saying it was misleading for students.

== Massachusetts bar case ==
In November 2008, Ross Mitchell, a 2004 Purdue Global Law JD graduate who had been admitted to the California bar, won a lawsuit to take the Massachusetts bar exam, which is normally only open to graduates of ABA-accredited law schools. The court ruled on equitable grounds, noting that under the ABA standards it would have been impossible for Purdue Global Law to have received accreditation, regardless of the quality of its educational offerings, because of its entirely online instruction.
