= Purdue University Global =

Online U.S. public university, part of Purdue University system

- Logo since 2023
- Type: Public online university
- Established: April 2, 2018; 8 years ago
- Parent institution: Purdue University system
- Accreditation: HLC
- Faculty: c. 3,600
- Students: 45,125 (fall 2022)
- Undergraduates: 33,192
- Postgraduates: 10,735
- Website: www.purdueglobal.edu

Purdue University Global, Inc. (Purdue Global) is a public online university that is a separately accredited part of the Purdue University system. Its primary focus is educating working adults.

Purdue Global was created in 2018 by Purdue University's acquisition and rebranding of for-profit Kaplan University. Kaplan Higher Education, a division of Graham Holdings Company (GHC), provides non-academic support services such as recruitment, admissions, human resources, marketing, and technology support. As such, GHC maintains an ongoing financial interest in the success of Purdue Global.

The university specializes in educating working adults who have life experience and often some college credits. Its programs focus on career-oriented fields of study at the certificate, associate, bachelor's, master's, and doctoral levels. Purdue Global serves about 10,000 military-affiliated students consisting of uniformed personnel, veterans, and eligible dependents.

Purdue Global is led by an emeritus Purdue faculty member and administrator, and is overseen by the Purdue system's leadership, specifically the university president and five members of the system's board of trustees. Its main campus (for accreditation purposes) is in West Lafayette, Indiana, and its online law school is based out of California.

== History ==
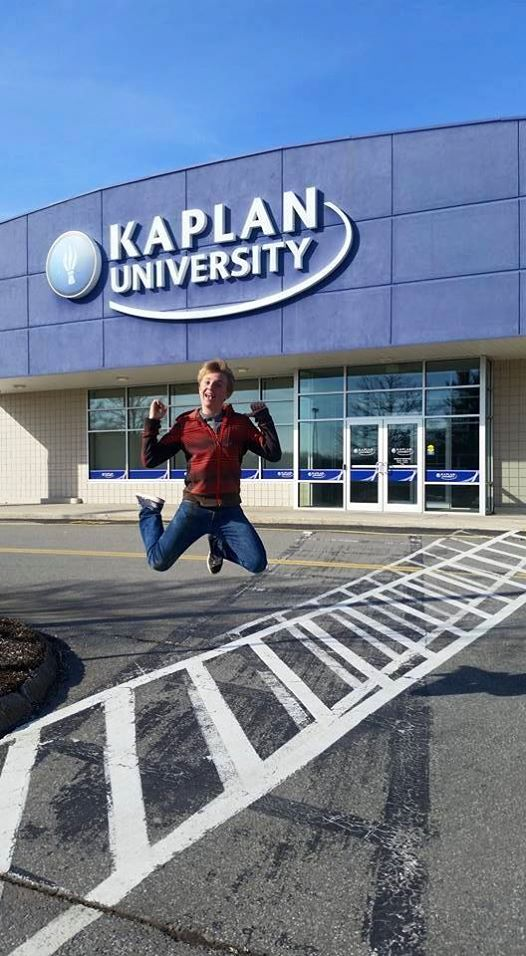
Kaplan University campus in Maine, 2017. The campus became part of Purdue University Global.

=== Founding ===
Prior to Purdue's acquisition, Kaplan University had undergone enrollment decline from 39,800 students in 2015 to just 32,000 students enrolled in April 2017. By the time Kaplan University became Purdue University Global in April 2018, enrollment was "approximately 30,000".

Following several years of government scrutiny, media criticism, and significant enrollment decline, Graham Holdings Company sold Kaplan University to the Purdue University system for one dollar in March 2018. Purdue rebranded the institution as Purdue University Global and agreed to employ Kaplan, Inc., a subsidiary of GHC, as the exclusive provider of nonacademic functions. Kaplan, Inc. agreed to assume responsibility for liabilities resulting before the transaction. According to the contract terms, Kaplan would receive 12.5-13 percent of the university's revenue, in addition to reimbursement for its costs of providing support to the school, as long as funds are available after all operating expenses and guaranteed payments to Purdue have been covered.

Purdue University president Mitch Daniels announced the intent to acquire Kaplan University in April 2017. From 2017 to January 2018, the school's temporary placeholder name was NewU. Purdue University Global's lineage is rooted in a series of for-profit colleges: American Institute of Commerce (1937–1999), Quest College (1999–2000), and Kaplan College (2000–2004), later renamed Kaplan University (2004–2017). In the years prior to its sale to Purdue University, Kaplan University's parent company, Kaplan Inc., closed or sold several schools, including Kaplan College (a primarily brick and mortar vocational school, not to be confused with the online university that became Kaplan University in 2004), and Kaplan Career Institute, which were purchased by Education Corporation of America in 2015. Kaplan University was the last accredited higher education institution owned by Kaplan, Inc.

In 2017, Daniels stated that the Purdue University deal with Kaplan incurred "virtually no financial risk", and had a "strong upside potential". Critics and analysts disagreed with Daniels' assessment, and in order to obtain regulatory approval, the U.S. Department of Education required Purdue to assume responsibility for Kaplan University's debt and liability "whether they are known or unknown, and whether they accrue prior to, or after the closing of the transaction" noting the debts and liabilities backed by Purdue "constitute an instrumentality of the state of Indiana for the purpose of the department's regulations". In the acquisition agreement Kaplan agreed to assume responsibility for liabilities resulting before the transaction, however the U.S. Department of Education "ultimately holds Purdue and the state of Indiana responsible for liabilities resulting from the operation of Kaplan University". Through the acquisition, Kaplan guaranteed Purdue priority payments of $10 million a year for the first five years following the transaction, of which $20 million was paid upon closing.

Daniels also said in 2017 that the contrast between the typical Purdue West Lafayette student and the targeted Purdue Global student was "stark". According to Purdue Global, 60 percent of Kaplan's students were over age 30, and the mean student income at enrollment was $22,323. For 55 percent of the students, neither parent had attended college.

According to Purdue University, Purdue Global had an $18 million loss in FY 2018, its first year of operation. Purdue University Treasurer Bill Sullivan said in regards to the 2018 finances, "losses are likely to continue another year, maybe two" and this was "a deliberate strategic choice and was, importantly, prefunded by Kaplan Higher Education (KHE) through the assets it brought to Purdue at acquisition" valued at more than $66 million in cash. Sullivan also stated that he expected "elevated startup costs to continue into 2019 and more modestly in 2020".

As predicted, following a $130 million marketing spend, in 2020 the university reversed the enrollment decline, growing 5 percent or 1,422 students to a total of 31,042 enrolled with 11 percent growth for bachelor's and graduate students, along with a 17 percent decline in certificate students, and a 5 percent decline in associate degree students. By fiscal year 2021, the impact of the enrollment growth put the university in a financially positive position for the first time with a reported gain of $5.25 million and $10 million in fiscal 2022.

=== Early leaders ===
In March 2020, Frank Dooley replaced Betty Vandenbosch as chancellor of Purdue University Global. In May 2020, Jon Harbor took over as provost of Purdue Global and Marilyn Wideman, dean of the School of Nursing, announced her retirement. In January 2025, Jon Harbor assumed the role of interim chancellor of Purdue University Global, following the retirement of former chancellor Frank Dooley.

In February 2020, Purdue University announced that Purdue Global would be holding a virtual reality component to its Los Angeles graduation ceremony.

== Campus and learning site locations ==
Purdue University Global operates primarily online. The university's main office is located in West Lafayette, Indiana. Residents of Indiana are offered discounted tuition and Purdue employees and their families are offered free tuition.

== Organization and Administration ==
=== Academic relationship to the Purdue University System ===
Purdue Global operates as a separately accredited institution within the Purdue University system, is the only institution in the system operating as a public-benefit corporation, and the only in which 12.5-13 percent of operating revenue are redirected to its prior for-profit owner Graham Holdings Company.

Each campus of the Purdue University system has its own accreditation, leadership, faculty, programs, and admissions policies. As a result, transfers between the campuses are highly limited. Purdue Global is classified by the U.S. Department of Education as a four-year public university but it does not receive state tax dollars due to its public benefit corporation status, and it is exempt from some of the public records disclosure requirements of public universities in Indiana. According to the 2017 law that enabled Purdue or any other Indiana university to create an affiliated education institution, it still must report financial, academic and student success data to Indiana regulators, and any decisions made by the traditional side of Purdue or emails received by Purdue's administration remain eligible to the open records law, even if they pertain to Purdue Global.

With the exception of Purdue Global, all degrees from all Purdue University campuses and Purdue degree programs offered through Indiana University – Purdue University Indianapolis (now named Purdue University in Indianapolis) and Purdue Polytechnic Institute share a similar diploma bearing the name of the institution granting the degree and the city in which it is given. Purdue Global graduates receive a diploma that uses the name "Purdue University Global" instead of the system name, and bears the Purdue Global logo in place of the Purdue University seal. Purdue University and Purdue University Global share the same alumni association.

In July 2019, Purdue Polytechnic Institute announced it had received a $12 million grant from the US Department of Labor to enable 5,000 students to go through a cybersecurity apprenticeship program over the next four years. The Polytechnic Institute will partner with Purdue Global to offer online instruction nationwide for "nontraditional students" seeking work in the cybersecurity industry.

=== Relationship to Graham Holdings and Kaplan Higher Education ===
As a requirement of the purchase of Kaplan University from Graham Holdings, Purdue University Global is required to employ Kaplan Higher Education, Inc., for 30 years as the exclusive provider of "marketing and advertising, front-end student advising, admissions support, financial aid and student finance, international student recruitment, test preparation, business office, technology support, human resources, finance and accounting functions". The Purdue trustees retain management control and responsibility over these areas.

According to the contract terms, Kaplan would receive 12.5-13 percent of the university's revenue, and reimbursement for its costs of providing support to the school as long as funds were available after all operating expenses and guaranteed payments to Purdue have been covered. Kaplan guaranteed Purdue $10 million every year for the first five years. Kaplan would make up the difference if PG revenues were insufficient. At the time of purchase, Kaplan's owners paid $20 million to Purdue, pursuant to that agreement. The agreement also stipulated that if Purdue altered the university's operations in a way that significantly reduces the school's revenues, Kaplan could seek reimbursement for 12.5 percent of the lost revenue. An independent financial analyst would be tasked to adjudicate the issue. Since the acquisition, Purdue's leadership made several changes including closing several physical locations where Kaplan University had operated.

If Purdue Global were to incur $25 million in cash operating losses for three consecutive years, or total cash operating losses of more than $75 million at any point, either Purdue or Kaplan Higher Education could terminate the contract.

According to Graham Holdings Company, "After the sixth year, Purdue Global has the right to terminate the agreement upon payment of an early termination fee equal to 125% of Purdue Global's total revenue earned during the preceding 12-month period..."

Upon termination, Purdue University Global would retain the assets that Kaplan contributed, but would also assume responsibility for any liability arising from the operation of the institution.

Kaplan Higher Education is also an online program manager (OPM) of the Purdue University system.

== Finances ==
Global receives revenues from student tuition, tuition from corporate partners, grant or scholarship aid, Title IV funds, GI Bill funds, and Department of Defense Tuition Assistance. Title IV funds include Pell Grants and federal student loans.

As of 2025, Graham Holdings reported the potential for $104 million in reimbursements and fees that Purdue Global owed to Kaplan Higher Education. However, due to the nature of the contract between Purdue and Kaplan, much of this money can only be paid to Kaplan if Purdue Global has abundant cash. As described by Graham Holdings CEO Timothy O'Shaughnessy:

"Our arrangement with Purdue has a waterfall, or prioritization, that describes how cash that comes into the institution, primarily in the form of tuition payments, gets distributed. First to be reimbursed are the expenses that Purdue Global incurs. Second is a priority payment we make to Purdue for the first five years, which will be reimbursed to us in later years. Third are expenses incurred by Kaplan. Fourth – and only to the extent the institution has available cash – is Kaplan's compensation, which is a combination of the Kaplan fee and a deferred purchase price, currently totaling 12.5% of revenue. All revenue after payment of Kaplan's compensation belongs to Purdue. This waterfall ensures that Purdue is protected from losses..."

== Offerings, enrollment, and student body ==
Purdue Global is academically organized into seven schools:

- School of Aviation
- School of Business and Information Technology
- School of Health Sciences
- School of Multidisciplinary and Professional Studies
- School of Nursing
- College of Social and Behavioral Sciences
- Purdue Global Law School

=== Student body ===
Approximately 17 percent of Purdue Global's student body are full-time students. The demographics of the student population are 60 percent female, 53 percent white, 18 percent black, 16 percent Hispanic, 3 percent Asian, and 1 percent Native American. While the socio-economic diversity of Purdue University is 14 percent, the federal government reports 49 percent socio-economic diversity at Purdue Global. According to Purdue Global's website, 28 percent of the student body is affiliated with the military, 49 percent are the first in their family to pursue higher education degree, 83 percent are working while enrolled, and 78 percent are caregivers.

==== Military servicemembers and veterans ====
In 2019, Purdue Global ranked seventh in Department of Defense Tuition Assistance funding, with 6825 servicemembers using the benefits. Total DOD funding was $14,875,918. Purdue Global's student body in 2020 included about 7000 servicemembers and 5000 veterans. Members of the US Armed Forces, National Guard, Reserves, and veterans can obtain an AAS degree in small group management in as few as five courses and a BS in Professional Studies with 13 additional courses. In 2020, the National Center of Academic Excellence in Cyber Defense Education designated Purdue Global as a member school. In 2023, Purdue Global opened an extension at Vandenberg Space Force Base. Purdue Global was No. 8 overall nationally among primarily online universities in the Military Times' 2023 Best for Vets rankings.

=== Corporate partnerships ===
In February 2019, Papa John's Pizza announced that all its employees would receive free tuition at Purdue Global. In June 2019, Walmart announced that Purdue Global would be one of six schools in their Live Better U education benefit program. The program is being marketed with the "chance to get a degree for the cost of a dollar a day." In June 2019, security services firm Securitas announced an arrangement to cover at least 90% of the tuition costs toward four custom certificate programs developed in partnership with Purdue Global. In October 2019, ManTech began offering its employees tuition-free access to Purdue Global's Bachelor of Science in analytics degree. Other organizations that have announced partnerships with Purdue Global to offer their employees a tuition-free or reduced-tuition college degree include New Balance. In September 2020, Purdue Global announced an agreement with Gallup "to develop and deliver an academic program to support Gallup's Straight to Business initiative...an undergraduate microcredential, aligned with and stackable into bachelor's degree opportunities in analytics, business administration, communication, and industrial/organizational psychology."

==== Guild Education ====
In January 2020, Disney Aspire added Purdue University Global to its Network of Educational Providers. The program is managed by Guild Education. Guild Education also provides student workers from Walmart, Discover, Chipotle, and other Fortune 1000 companies. In 2024, Purdue Global became the preferred online university and degree provider of the Guild & Team USA Learning Network.

== Academics ==
Purdue University Global is an open admissions school that offers both traditional programs and standardized competency-based learning. This allows Purdue Global to offer college credit to students who can demonstrate they have mastered certain learning outcomes through professional and military training.

=== Accreditation ===
Like Purdue's other campuses, Purdue Global is accredited by the Higher Learning Commission. Specific degree programs are accredited by the ACBSP, ABET, CCNE, AHIMA, NALA, and others. Its Master of Science degree in finance is also registered with the Certified Financial Planner board and qualifies graduates to sit the CFP examination. Purdue Global's law school, Purdue Global Law School, is the only fully online law school in the country. Given that the American Bar Association does not accredit online universities, the school is unaccredited by the ABA, but is accredited by the State Bar of California, allowing students to sit for the bar exam in that state. Purdue Global Law School students may also pursue an executive JD, designed for executives and others who seek graduate level training in law, but do not wish to become attorneys.

=== Faculty and learning systems ===
Following the acquisition, all Kaplan faculty became Purdue Global faculty which now include approximately 287 full-time faculty and 2,022 part-time faculty. Purdue University faculty were expected to become increasingly involved in launching programs and courses in the Purdue Global online system. To date, three new programs have been approved to be created in collaboration with Purdue's West Lafayette faculty including programs in pharmacy, and aviation.

Several Purdue University Global programs offer ExcelTrack, a competency-based education option which can cut costs and speed up student progress. ExcelTrack students can complete as many courses as possible at the same flat rate per term.

=== Student outcomes ===
According to the College Scorecard, Purdue University Global has a 33 percent graduation rate. Median salary after attending ranges from $21,000 (AA, teacher education) to $74,000 (BSN, nursing). Two years into student loan repayment, with Purdue Global students 32 percent were in forbearance, 29 percent were not making progress, 12 percent were in deferment, 11 percent defaulted, 6 percent were making progress, 6 percent were delinquent, 2 percent had their loans discharged, and 1 percent had paid in full.

College Navigator reports an overall graduation rate of 20 percent.

== Rankings ==
U.S. News & World Report ranks Purdue Global 395th-435th among national universities.

In January 2023, Purdue Global ranked 176th out of 442 schools in the Washington Monthly list of national universities, with a social mobility ranking of 95th out of 442 schools.

== Leadership and administration ==
Mitch Daniels currently serves as the interim president of Purdue University and Purdue Global. He reports to Purdue Global's board of trustees, which is appointed by the Purdue University board of trustees. Five of Purdue's University's trustees also serve on the Purdue Global board.

Eva Nodine was appointed as CEO of Purdue Global in February 2026. Nodine had previously served as Purdue Global's chief financial officer and chief operating officer.

== Praise and criticism of acquisition ==
In May 2017, the Purdue University Senate passed a resolution condemning the deal between Kaplan Higher Education and Purdue University. In September 2017, Senators Dick Durbin (D-IL) and Sherrod Brown (D-OH) warned that Purdue's acquisition of Kaplan University posed major risks for Purdue University's students and reputation. They added that Kaplan has a "shameful record" as a "predatory" school. Mitch Daniels, president of Purdue University, stated that the two senators were "misinformed". Regarding criticisms of Kaplan's for-profit days, Daniels quotes former Democratic senator Tom Harkin who led a massive 2011 investigation into the for-profit education sector but praised Kaplan for standing "alone among the large, for-profit education companies for having taken what are, in my opinion, real and significant steps to reduce high withdrawal rates and high default rates by implementing the Kaplan Commitment program."

In January 2018, the former Under Secretary of Education under Barack Obama, Ted Mitchell, praised the university that would become Purdue Global for its massive investments "in a learning platform that is, in my estimation, among the best in the country ... It is a 'lab' whose continued work promises insights not only for [Purdue Global] but for [Purdue University] and the wider field..." and that "Kaplan has been a pioneer in creating protections for students." Mitchell, the force behind Obama's Gainful Employment rules, also praised Kaplan for strong results and for taking action when they came up short, saying "Kaplan's results have been strong, and where they haven't, as in the failure of a number of their programs to meet the Gainful Employment thresholds, they have taken action to either remediate or close the programs...That's how we want institutions to react to troubling outcomes." Arne Duncan, the former U.S. Secretary of Education under Obama who, with Mitchell, led a crackdown on the for-profit sector, praised the potential behind Purdue's acquisition of Kaplan University, saying "...I'm excited by this opportunity for a world-class university to expand its reach and help educate adult learners by acquiring a strong for-profit college. This is a first, and if successful, could help create a new model for what it means to be a land-grant institution." Harvard researcher Todd Rogers praised the launch of Purdue Global for its potential to generate "more learning and greater scaled implementation of interventions that help students succeed" and that the university had "...a genuine commitment to using learning and motivational sciences to improve student outcomes, and to conducting high quality research to become a leader in contributing to those sciences".

On January 16, 2018, the Purdue Exponent editorial board stated that the Purdue University Global name was "downright deceitful" for using the Purdue name and not including the Kaplan name. In August 2018, former deputy undersecretary of education Bob Shireman called Purdue University Global "a for-profit college masquerading as a public university." Daniels pointed out that Shireman has been accused of misrepresenting facts in his criticisms and had been forced to leave the U.S. Department of Education under a cloud of accusations that he had colluded with short-sellers attempting to reduce stock values in the for-profit sector. PG initially required students to waive most rights to sue the school and submit disputes to arbitration. The American Association of University Professors called this policy "the stuff of predatory for-profit colleges, not a leading public research institution". The AAUP petitioned the Higher Learning Commission, the school's accrediting body, on this issue. In September 2018, Senators Durbin and Brown called for Purdue to get rid of that policy, which came from the Kaplan rulebook. The policy was eliminated within the first year of the acquisition.

=== Continued objections from Purdue faculty and stakeholders ===
In January 2019, the Purdue Exponent stated that faculty were not consulted on the deliberations for the Purdue Global acquisition. Biologist David Sanders, a Purdue professor, university senate member, and local Democratic politician, hypothesized that the deal was enacted to help pay for the tuition freeze at the West Lafayette campus or that "'certain people see this as the future. I refer to it as the Walmart-ization of higher education....It's cheap, it's fast, but in two years, it'll be broken. The same thing is true with this sort of education.'" Sanders added he was concerned about Purdue University Global's $100 million marketing budget.

That same month, professors at Purdue University complained that Purdue Global was enrolling traditional students, which was in opposition to what Global had originally promised. The PG chancellor responded while there was no formal policy that prevented a full-time, traditional student from enrolling in a course as a non-degree seeking student, it was not the university's intent to enroll such students, and that only five of PG's 29,000 students enrolled in a single course in 2018. In May 2019, three professors claimed that Purdue University Global was draining Purdue University's branch campuses, and the deal with Kaplan Higher Education was "online folly. Purdue University CFO Bill Sullivan responded that the degree to which the piece "misread Purdue's financial statements and distorted both the financial state and mission of Purdue Global is truly disappointing and unfortunate." Sullivan added that "In negotiating the acquisition of Kaplan University, we crafted an agreement that provided a nearly impenetrable defense of Purdue's finances.

In January 2020, the Chronicle of Higher Education published a report on Purdue Global titled "Purdue Global Has Had a Rocky Start. Is It Growing Pains or a Sign of Trouble?". In September 2020, the Century Foundation "raised questions about the documents Purdue University Global presented to the Internal Revenue Service when it applied for tax-exempt status in August 2019." Purdue University denied the claims.

In the February issue of Emergency Medical News, two doctors questioned the vetting process of Purdue Global's nursing master's degree programs, which admitted all 500 applicants in Fall, 2019.
