= Stanley Kaplan =

American businessman and scholastic test preparation pioneer

Stanley H. Kaplan
- Born: Stanley Kaplan; May 24, 1919; New York City, U.S.
- Died: August 23, 2009 (aged 90); New York City, U.S.
- Other name: Cram King
- Education: City College of New York
- Occupations: Test preparation tutor and entrepreneur
- Known for: Founder of Kaplan, Inc.
- Spouse: Rita Gwirtzman Kaplan
- Relatives: Scott Belsky

Stanley Henry Kaplan (May 24, 1919 – August 23, 2009) was an American teacher who founded Kaplan, Inc., in 1938.

== Early life and education ==
Kaplan was born in New York City, to Jewish immigrant parents from the present-day countries of Latvia and Belarus. He grew up in the Flatbush section of Brooklyn. He was the son of a plumbing contractor. His grandson is Scott Belsky.

He entered City College of New York at the age of 16 and graduated Phi Beta Kappa and second in his class in 1939. He received his M.S.E. (Master of Science in Education) from City College in 1941.

== Career ==
An aspiring physician, Kaplan hoped to enter medicine, but said he was rejected from all five New York City area medical schools because ethnic quotas for Jewish students had already been filled. In his autobiography, he asserted that this experience led him to favor standardized testing, which he believed would have allowed him to demonstrate his merit to medical schools.

In 1938, Kaplan founded the Stanley H. Kaplan Co. as a tutoring service based in the basement of his parents' home in Brooklyn, New York. At first, he tutored high school students to take the New York State Regents Examinations, but in 1946, in response to a student's request, Kaplan expanded his business to include preparation for what was then called the Scholastic Aptitude Test (SAT). This coincided with a large increase in college enrollment following World War II, when the United States government passed the GI Bill.

Kaplan marketed his for-profit company's products on the notion that its tutorials and test preparation materials could increase a student's SAT scores. In 1979, the Federal Trade Commission (FTC) launched an investigation into claims that the test prep industry was advertising its services too aggressively. Kaplan had claimed that his company could increase a student's SAT score by 100 points, though he never paid for advertising this claim. The Federal Trade Commission concluded that Kaplan may indeed raise a student's math and verbal SAT scores, but only by an average of 25 points, not the 100 points that Stanley Kaplan had believed.

The conclusion by the FTC that Kaplan could raise scores, even by as little as 25 points, rapidly expanded the company's business and attracted thousands of new customers. Leading figures within education, especially higher education, continued to scoff at Kaplan's company, saying that no student could effectively study for the SATs. Educators claimed that the SATs measured a person's "innate ability to learn", not their "actual learning."

A turning point in relations between Stanley Kaplan and the educational establishment came in 1983, when the College Board, which administers the SATs, asked Kaplan to speak at its annual conference. In an article in 2009, The Washington Post wrote that Kaplan viewed the invitation by the College Board as one of the high points of his life. Kaplan opened his speech to the conference attendees by telling them that, "Never, in my wildest dreams did I ever think I'd be speaking to you here today."

In 1984, Stanley Kaplan sold his company to The Washington Post Company for US$45 million. The acquisition enabled the Washington Post Company, whose operations had previously focused on newspapers, to become a larger media and education entity. At the time of Stanley Kaplan's death in 2009, the Kaplan Co. brought in two-thirds of its annual revenue from other educational services besides SAT prep, such as pre-kindergarten and even accredited law programs. In 2008, Kaplan Co.'s revenue was US$2.3 billion, from an estimated one million students who enrolled in its courses that year. In a single quarter of 2009, Kaplan, Inc., accounted for approximately 58% of The Washington Post Company's total revenue.

== Death ==
Weeks after the folding of Kaplan subsidiary SCORE! Educational Centers, Stanley Kaplan died of a heart ailment on August 23, 2009, at his home in New York City at the age of 90.

== Selected works ==
- Kaplan, Stanley H. (with Anne Farris), Stanley H. Kaplan, test pilot : how I broke testing barriers for millions of students and caused a sonic boom in the business of education, New York : Simon & Schuster, 2001. ISBN 074320168X
