= Open Graph protocol =

Web page protocol for real-time updates

The Open Graph Protocol
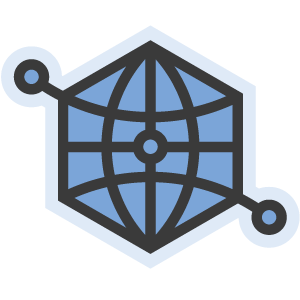
- Open Graph Logo The official Open Graph logo.

Protocol Overview
Original Author	Facebook (Meta Platforms)
Initial Release	2010
Type	Metadata standard
Format	HTML `<meta>` tags
XML Namespace	http://ogp.me

Required Core Tags
- og:title — Title of the object; og:type — Type of object (e.g., video); og:image — Preview image URL; og:url — Canonical URL ID

Official Links
Website	ogp.me

The Open Graph Protocol is a specialized web page protocol used between client devices (computers, mobile phones, tablets, etc.). The protocol was initially designed for Facebook to enable developers to integrate their pages into Facebook's global mapping/tracking tool Social Graph. These pages gain the functionality of other graph objects including profile links and stream updates for connected users.

In recent years the protocol gained wide spread use and also was integrated into functionality in major messaging apps. The protocol utilized in messaging apps such as iMessage adds the functionality whereby if a user shares a URL, the corresponding Open Graph metadata of the URL will allow for the display of the thumbnail or assigned image as part of the link.

== History ==
The protocol was initially published in 2010 as part of Facebook. Starting in 2016 it became integrated with iMessage in a functionality Apple initially called Rich Link. Later on it was also integrated with Whatsapp messaging.

== External ==
- Open Graph & Social Link Card Validator
