= Graham Holdings =

American diversified company

Graham Holdings Company
- Formerly: The Washington Post Company (1947–2013)
- Type: Public
- Traded as: NYSE: GHC (Class B); S&P 400 component
- Industry: Conglomerate
- Incorporated: Delaware
- Founded: August 4, 1947; 79 years ago in Washington, D.C., U.S.
- Headquarters: Arlington County, Virginia, United States
- Key people: Donald E. Graham (chairman emeritus); Tim O'Shaughnessy (president and CEO)
- Products: Magazines; Educational Services; Television; Cable television Electronic media
- Revenue: ▲US$3.924 Billion (Fiscal Year Ended December 31, 2022)
- Operating income: ▼US$83.898 Million (Fiscal Year Ended December 31, 2022)
- Net income: ▼US$67.08 Million (Fiscal Year Ended December 31, 2022)
- Total assets: ▲US$6.582 Billion (Fiscal Year Ended December 31, 2022)
- Total equity: ▲US$3.752 Billion (Fiscal Year Ended December 31, 2022)
- Number of employees: 11,500 (2015)
- Website: www.ghco.com

Graham Holdings Company (formerly the Washington Post Company) is a diversified American conglomerate holding company. Headquartered in Arlington County, Virginia, and incorporated in Delaware, it was formerly the owner of The Washington Post newspaper and Newsweek magazine.

Its current holdings include:

- the digital marketing company Code3 (formerly SocialCode)
- online and print media entities including Slate Magazine, Foreign Policy through the FP Group, which includes Foreign Policy magazine and ForeignPolicy.com),
- local news podcasting and media company City Cast
- Graham Media Group (formerly Post-Newsweek Stations), a group of seven television stations
- education company Kaplan
- manufacturing operations including Hoover Treated Wood Products, Dekko, Joyce/Dayton Corp, Forney Corporation;
- Graham Healthcare Group, which provides home health, hospice and palliative care services through joint ventures with health systems and physicians groups as well as other services
- Graham Automotive, which includes eight automotive dealerships around the Washington, D.C. region
- content and marketplace company World of Good Brands (formerly Leaf Group)

Graham Holdings Company also owned cable television and internet service provider Cable One until it was spun off in 2015 and the now-defunct Trove (formerly WaPo Labs)—the developers of a news reader app.

== Corporate history ==
The history of Graham Holdings Company dates back to 1877, when The Washington Post was first published. The Washington Post Company was incorporated in the District of Columbia in 1889, and remained a District of Columbia corporation until it changed its place of incorporation to Delaware in 2003. It is a public company and its Class B common stock trades on the New York Stock Exchange under the ticker symbol GHC; it went public in 1971.

Descendants of the late Eugene Meyer (including Chairman Donald E. Graham, the heirs of his sister Lally Weymouth, and the beneficiaries of various family trusts) collectively control the company through their ownership of the unlisted Class A common stock that selects 70% of the company's board of directors. As of 2014, it forms more than 90% of the family's assets. Prior to 2014, Berkshire Hathaway was a substantial holder of the public Class B common stock that selects 30% of the company's board of directors, but exchanged most of that stock for WPLG-TV, one of Graham Holdings' television stations, and other assets, in 2014.

Since 1950, the company had been based in the Washington Post building in Washington, D.C., which was sold off separately in 2014. Its new headquarters are at 1300 North 17th Street in Arlington, Virginia, with the choice of state motivated (according to Don Graham) by the proximity to Congress and the fact that two of the holding's activity areas, education and health care, are subject to federal regulation.

In 1984, the company purchased Stanley H. Kaplan Education Centers, Ltd., a Brooklyn-based tutoring company which in subsequent decades would grow its footprint and expand its offerings beyond test prep to become Kaplan, Inc.

On August 5, 2013, it was announced that the Washington Post Company would sell the flagship newspaper for $250 million to Jeff Bezos, founder and chief executive of Amazon.com. The Washington Post Company agreed to adopt a new corporate name once the sale was finalized. It adopted Graham Holdings Company as the new name effective November 29, 2013. Amazon.com was not involved in the sale. Nash Holdings LLC, a company owned by Bezos, closed the purchase of the newspaper and affiliated publications on October 1, 2013. Graham Holdings Company retained ownership of WaPo Labs, its technology innovation group, since rebranded as Trove.

In 2014, Tim O'Shaughnessy, founder of LivingSocial and a son-in-law of CEO Don Graham, joined GHC as president. O'Shaughnessy became CEO in November 2015. In July 2015, Graham Holdings spun off Cable One as a separate, publicly traded company.

In March 2018, Graham sold Kaplan University, Kaplan's online higher education operation, to the Purdue University system, which subsequently rebranded it as Purdue University Global. In 2019, children's podcasting company Pinna spun out of the Slate Group as a separate Graham Holdings subsidiary. In June 2021, Graham Holdings completed their acquisition of Leaf Group at a valuation of approximately $323 million. In 2023 Anne M. Mulcahy succeeded Donald Graham as Chairman of the Board while Graham became Chairman Emeritus and continued to chair the Executive Committee.

== Holdings ==
=== Broadcasting ===
Through its Graham Media Group subsidiary (formerly Post-Newsweek Stations), Graham Holdings owns a group of seven television stations. Led by chief executive officer Catherine Badalamente, the company is based in Detroit, co-located with its local NBC affiliate WDIV-TV.

Stations are arranged in alphabetical order by state and city of license.

City of license / market	Station	Channel TV (RF)	Owned since	Primary affiliation
Jacksonville	WJXT	4 (42)	1953	Independent
Jacksonville	WCWJ	17 (34)	2017	The CW
Orlando - Daytona Beach - Melbourne	WKMG-TV	6 (26)	1997	CBS
Detroit	WDIV	4 (45)	1978	NBC
Houston	KPRC-TV	2 (35)	1994	NBC
San Antonio	KSAT-TV	12 (12)	1994	ABC
Roanoke	WSLS-TV	10 (30)	2017	NBC

Graham Holdings Company also owns several companies active in various capacities on the World Wide Web. These include The Slate Group, which publishes Slate, Slate V, ForeignPolicy.com and World of Good Brands (formerly the Leaf Group). The Root, an online magazine focusing on African American culture, was owned by The Slate Group until Graham Holdings sold it to Univision Communications in 2015. Graham Holdings Company also owns SocialCode, an advertising agency specializing in social media/ID-based marketing, and is an investor in Pinna, a children's podcast company.

In November 2014, Graham Holdings Company acquired Social News Desk, a social media management platform for newsrooms, through its subsidiary, Graham Media Group.

In June 2021, Graham Holdings acquired Leaf Group, a consumer internet company that runs both online consumer-orientated brands and marketplace brands. In 2023, the Leaf Group was restructured to become World of Good Brands, separating Leaf's lifestyle publishing websites – Well+Good, Livestrong, Hunker and OnlyInYourState — from its marketplace businesses, Saatchi Art and Society6. In 2024, Hunker was sold to Static Media. In 2025, Graham sold off Well+Good and Livestrong to Ziff Davis and Only In Your State to Launch Potato. After the sales, the World of Good Brands ceased and all staff in the division were laid off.

=== Health care ===
In October 2012, the firm purchased Celtic Healthcare Inc. for an undisclosed sum. Celtic Healthcare, based in Pennsylvania, provides home health care in western, central, and northeastern Pennsylvania as well as Montgomery and Baltimore County, Maryland. It also provides home hospice services in the same areas, as well as owns a 10-bed inpatient hospice in Dunmore, Pennsylvania. In 2014, it had around 558 full-time and 45 part-time employees.

In 2014, Graham Holdings bought a majority stake in Troy, Michigan-based Residential Healthcare Group, the parent company of Residential Home Health and Residential Hospice, which provides at-home and on-site health care and hospice services in Michigan and Illinois.

Graham Healthcare Group provides home health, hospice and palliative care services through joint ventures with health systems and physicians groups. The subsidiary designs business and technology solutions aimed at streamlining hospice and home health operations and improving quality of care. Graham Healthcare Group includes Residential Healthcare Group, Allegheny Health Network-Healthcare @ Home, Mary Free Bed at Home, Clarus and InTeliCare.

Graham Healthcare Group also operates a nationwide specialty pharmacy licensed in 38 states that serves patients suffering from chronic illness through its Clinical Specialty Infusions, LLC (CSI Pharmacy) business located in Texarkana, Texas. Through its Clarus Care, LLC (Clarus) business in Nashville, Tennessee, GHG provides call management solutions to physician groups and hospitals.

=== Manufacturing ===
In July 2013, Graham Holdings purchased Forney Corp. for an undisclosed sum. The company, which is based in Addison, Texas, manufactures equipment that monitors and controls the combustion of coal, natural gas, and other materials. This equipment is sold to electric utilities for use in power generation plants. In June 2014, Graham Holdings acquired Joyce/Dayton Corp., a Dayton, Ohio-based manufacturer of screw jacks and other linear-motion systems.

In November 2015, Graham Holdings acquired Group Dekko, a Garrett, Indiana-based electrical manufacturer. In 2017, Graham acquired Hoover Treated Wood Products, Inc, a supplier of lumber and plywood products for fire retardant and preservative applications. In May 2020, Graham Holdings announced that it had acquired Framebridge.

=== Restaurants ===
In July 2019, Graham Holdings acquired Clyde's Restaurant Group, the owner and operator of several restaurants in the Washington metropolitan area, including Old Ebbitt Grill.

=== Automotive ===
In January 2019, Graham Holdings acquired 90% of two automobile dealerships from Sonic Automotive. The company's latest acquisition — its fourth auto dealership to date — is located at 8820 Centreville Road in Manassas. Christopher J. Ourisman of Ourisman Automotive will operate and manage the dealership, which the Arlington holding company purchased from the Battlefield Automotive Group. Terms of the deal were not disclosed.

=== Education ===
In 1984, Graham Holdings (then The Washington Post Company), acquired Stanley H. Kaplan Educational Centers. In the 1990s, the company expanded abroad and grew beyond test preparation, expanding its training and publishing businesses, diversifying into English language training, higher education, pathways programs, online learning and other services. It launched the first online law school, Concord Law School, in 1998. Over the years, it has purchased several other educational companies and schools worldwide, expanding its operations and delivery of courses and programs in key markets beyond North America including the UK, Ireland, Singapore, Australia, and New Zealand.

Kaplan today offers a variety of test preparation, professional training, career development, language training, university and student support services. Kaplan has over 10,000 employees in 27 countries, and partners include more than 12,000 businesses and 4000 educational institutions.
