= Kaplan, Inc. =

International educational services company

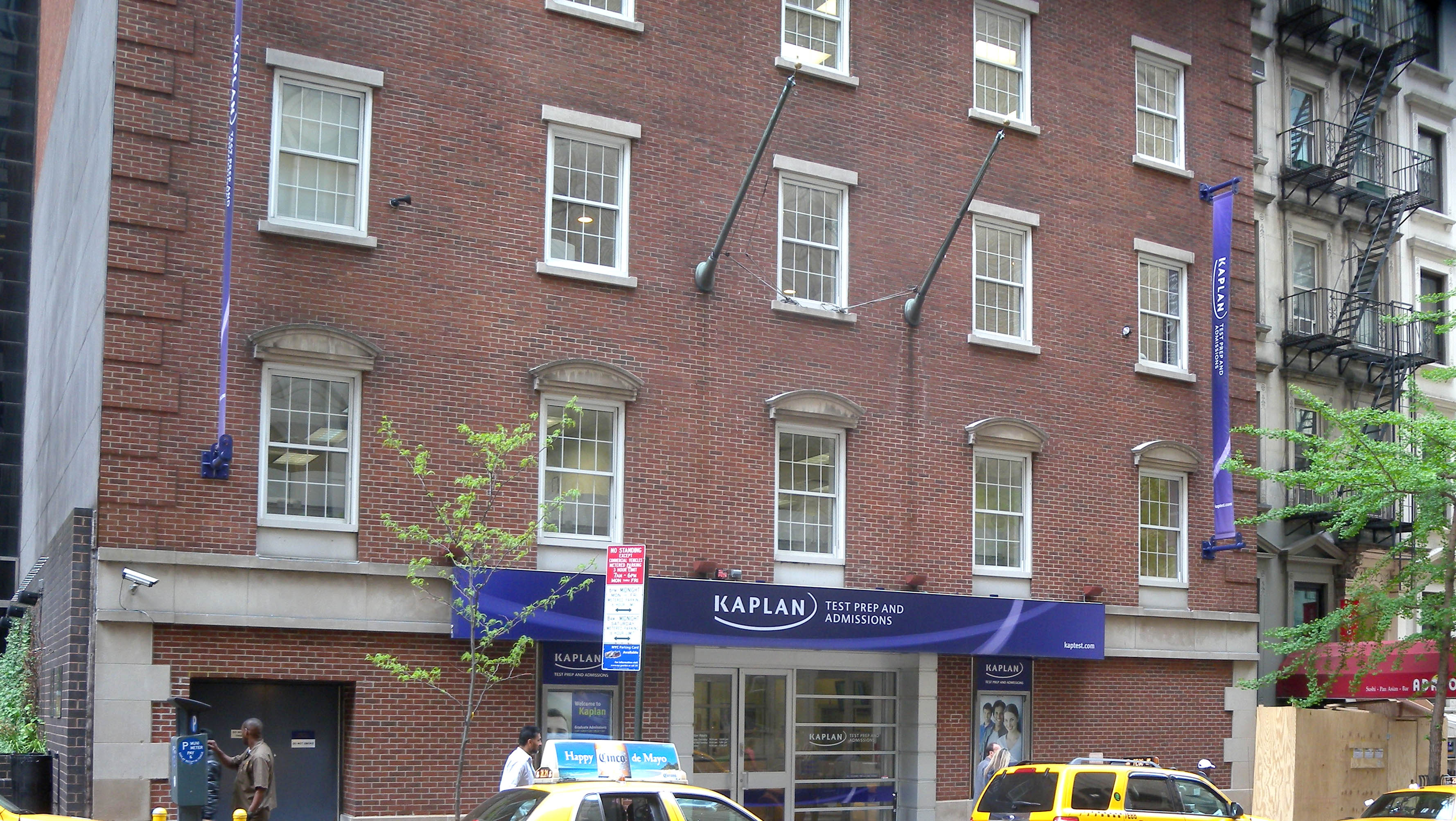
- Kaplan in Midtown Manhattan
- Type: Subsidiary
- Industry: Education
- Founded: 1938; 88 years ago
- Founder: Stanley Kaplan
- Headquarters: Fort Lauderdale, Florida, U.S.
- Key people: Andrew Rosen (chairman and CEO)
- Products: Test Preparation, Educational Training
- Revenue: US$1.3 billion (2020)
- Owner: Graham Holdings Company
- Number of employees: 12,000
- Parent: Graham Holdings Company
- Divisions: Kaplan North America, Kaplan International
- Website: Kaplan.com

Kaplan, Inc. is an international educational services company that provides educational and training services to colleges, universities, businesses and individuals around the world. Founded in 1938 by Stanley Kaplan, the company offers a variety of test preparation, certifications, and student support services. The company is headquartered in Fort Lauderdale, Florida, and is a wholly owned subsidiary of Graham Holdings Company.

== History ==
Kaplan, Inc. was founded in 1938 by Stanley H. Kaplan, a first-generation son of immigrants who began tutoring his classmates at age 14, operating from the basement of his parents' Brooklyn home. He originally aspired to be a doctor, but was rejected from all medical schools he applied to, despite his exceptional academic record, because of anti-Semitic admissions policies at the time. When a student introduced him to the SAT, he wrote in his autobiography, Test Pilot, that he fell in love with the test, as it tested skills he knew how to teach. His business grew as many students sought help in preparing for college admission tests, particularly after World War II when U.S. government passed the G.I. Bill giving education to returning veterans. He later expanded it across the U.S. and abroad.

In 1984, Kaplan sold the company, then named Stanley H. Kaplan Educational Centers, to The Washington Post Company, now the Graham Holdings Company.

=== 1990s–present ===
In 1990s, the company expanded abroad and grew beyond test preparation, expanding its training and publishing businesses, diversifying into English language training, higher education, pathways programs, online learning and other services. It launched the first online law school, Concord Law School, in 1998. Over the years, it has purchased several other educational companies and schools worldwide, expanding its operations and delivery of courses and programs in markets beyond North America including the UK, Ireland, Singapore, Australia, and New Zealand. The company's leader during this expansion period was Jonathan Grayer.

In 2000, Kaplan acquired Quest Education Corporation, which served 30 schools in 11 states. Quest Education Corporation was renamed Kaplan Higher Education in 2002.

In April 2004, Kaplan Higher Education owned 64 campuses, including Hesser College in New Hampshire, and CEI College in California.

In 2003, Kaplan acquired the Financial Training Company, an established provider of financial services training in the UK, with operations in Hong Kong, Shanghai and Singapore. Later that year, the company's acquisition of Dublin Business School in Ireland launched its entry into Europe's private college market.

Kaplan expanded its private education offerings and global reach in 2005 with the acquisition of Asia Pacific Management Institute, a Singapore-based business school (later renamed to Kaplan Singapore). In 2005 Kaplan also expanded into international student pathways programs, partnering with Nottingham Trent University to set up Nottingham Trent International College, created to prepare students for university enrollment through English language training and academic preparation for A-level standards.

In 2006, Kaplan expanded its English language business with the acquisition of Aspect Education, a global languages school with schools in the UK, Ireland, Canada, Australia, New Zealand and the US.

In 2016, Kaplan partnered with ACT, the ACT college admissions test maker, to make low-cost, online test prep free for low-income students.

In 2017, Purdue University announced the acquisition of Kaplan University, and the sale was completed in 2018. The new institution became Purdue University Global, providing students with accredited distance learning worldwide.

In 2018, as part of an effort to overhaul UK legal education and create a common standard for professional qualification, the Solicitors Regulation Authority (SRA) selected Kaplan to develop and deliver the Solicitors Qualifying Exam (SQE). Introduced in September 2021, the exam is the qualifying assessment for professionals seeking to become solicitors in England or Wales.

During the pandemic in 2020, Kaplan partnered with Hexco Academic to host its first national online spelling bee. The winner of the Kaplan Online Spelling Bee, Zaila Avant-garde, went on to become the first African American to win the Scripps National Spelling Bee in 2021.

In 2021, Kaplan launched Career Core, a shared career services model, in partnership with Wake Forest University, Adelphi University, Florida International University, Point Loma Nazarene University, University of Arizona, University of Montana, Alpha Tau Omega, and Kappa Alpha Order.

In 2022, Amazon announced a partnership with Kaplan to make academic and career coaching services available to its 750,000 hourly employees in the U.S. as part of its Career Choice upskilling program.

In February 2025, Kaplan announced a partnership with the state of Illinois to provide free test preparation to over 200,000 students at public universities and selected community colleges throughout the state which is considered the first state sponsored workforce development program of its kind in the U.S. and allows students throughout the state access to more than 40 test prep courses at no cost. Illinois Student Assistance Commission's representative announced that the program is an important measure to help remove some of the financial barriers students face in advancing their education and careers.

== Products and services ==
Kaplan offers a variety of educational and training products and services, including tutoring, on-site classes, live programs, print books, online products, and more, to individuals, universities, and businesses.

=== For businesses ===
For businesses, Kaplan operates the following.

- Professional training and certification for financial advisory professionals, as well as training to qualify for professional certification in securities, accounting, insurance, real estate, engineering, architecture and other sectors
- Education-as-benefit programs brokered with university partners, including customized degree and certificate programs
- Apprenticeship programs, in collaboration with the UK government and employers
- Career coaching and college advising for employees

=== Kaplan Law School ===
Kaplan Law School was a for-profit educational institution offering post-graduate legal training in London for those wishing to become a solicitor in England and Wales. It was situated on Borough High Street. In April 2016, it announced the closure of all programmes to new applicants, effectively ending the school's activities. Kaplan Law School was opened by the British arm of Kaplan in September 2007. It operated in partnership with Nottingham Law School by providing Nottingham's professional legal courses in Central London. The school had been operating at a loss, losing £683,000 in 2012 and £268,000 in 2013.

== Corporate overview ==
Kaplan has over 10,000 employees in 27 countries, and partners include more than 12,000 businesses and 4000 educational institutions. The company's chairman and CEO is Andrew S. Rosen, and its 2020 revenue was $1.3 billion.

=== Kaplan International (KI) ===
Kaplan International is based in London and operates educational businesses in North America, Europe, Asia Pacific, and the Middle East.

KI operates English language training schools and university pathways programs in North America.

==== Europe ====
In Europe, KI operates:

- Kaplan Professional UK includes Kaplan Financial, which provides training and test preparation services for professionals in accounting, financial services, securities trading, insurance and other financial services. Kaplan UK also provides apprenticeship training in banking and financial services, accountancy and tax, and data and technology industries. Additionally, it operates Kaplan Assessments, the assessment provider for the Solicitors Qualifying Examination for all candidates seeking to become a solicitor in England and Wales
- KI Pathways offers academic preparation programs especially designed for international students who wish to study for degrees from universities in English-speaking countries
- KI Languages Group provides English-language training, academic preparation programs and test preparation for English proficiency exams, principally for students wishing to study and travel in English-speaking countries. It also offers instruction in Spanish, French and German
- Mander Portman Woodward, a U.K. independent sixth-form college that prepares domestic and international students for A-level examinations that are required for admission to U.K. universities
- Dublin Business School, a private college in Ireland that provides a range of full-time and part-time undergraduate and postgraduate programmes, with courses in subject areas such as business, law, accounting, event management, IT, arts, media studies and psychology
- Kaplan Open Learning, an online learning institution offering accredited online higher education degree programs through the University of Essex and University of Liverpool
- BridgeU, an adaptive guidance platform that connects universities with international secondary schools

In the Middle East, Kaplan operates a financial training business in Dubai, United Arab Emirates and Saudi Arabia.

==== Asia and Oceania ====
In Asia and Oceania, Kaplan operates primarily in Singapore, Australia, and Hong Kong.

=== Controversies ===
In 2007, a class-action lawsuit was settled for $30 million by Kaplan and BarBri, a company offering bar exam preparation. Among the allegations was a federal antitrust violation claiming that Kaplan had agreed not to compete in the bar review business while BarBri agreed it would not compete in the LSAT business. Both West Publishing Company (parent of BarBri) and Kaplan denied the allegations and the matter was resolved without any findings of wrongdoing.

Between the late 1990s-2015, Kaplan acquired and owned several for-profit colleges. A 2010 investigation by the Government Accountability Office (GAO) found deceptive practices at 15 for-profit college campuses, including two owned by Kaplan. After the GAO released its report, Kaplan halted recruiting at the campus, offered full tuition rebates, and brought in outside accountants to audit internal practices, including training manuals.

Several ex-employees alleged that Kaplan had broken the law and breached its agreement with the U.S. Department of Education including two former instructors who sued Kaplan in November 2006 for allegedly submitting false claims to the government and not adhering to the Higher Education Act's requirements for payment. The plaintiffs, who were previously employed at Kaplan's Pittsburgh-based campus, claimed that Kaplan had breached the 70 Percent Rule, which requires eligible schools to have a minimum graduation rate and job placement rate of 70%. Furthermore, they argued that Kaplan Career Institute had advertised job-placement rates without providing prospective students with job-placement statistics or state licensing requirements. In 2011, a federal judge in Miami refused to dismiss the lawsuits filed by former employees of Kaplan University and Kaplan Higher Education Corp, who allege that the companies have violated the Higher Education Act in order to gain federal funding and profits. Judge Patricia A. Seitz has denied the accusations related to Kaplan's manipulation of students' academic records and job-placement statistics, or their incentive payments based on student enrollment numbers. However, she has allowed the whistleblowers to continue to pursue claims of retaliation and other violations. Seitz found as well that the plaintiffs had failed to adequately provide prospective students with the data underlying job placement advertisements or to prove the falsity of the documents that were made available. Additionally, the plaintiffs failed to establish that Kaplan had not provided licensing information to prospective students. While she has dismissed that argument as "bare conclusions, she ruled that Kaplan's policy, which required minimum enrollment numbers for continued employment, did not violate the Higher Education Act."

In 2010, the Florida Attorney General started an investigation into whether five for-profit colleges, including Kaplan, violated Florida's Deceptive and Unfair Trade Practices Act by making misleading statements, misrepresentations, and omitting or failed to disclose material information related to market their programs and schools.

In 2012, the North Carolina Attorney General determined that Kaplan had lied to students about the credentials they would earn in the Dental Assistant program. Following the investigation Kaplan College Charlotte campus surrendered its license to operate a school. Kaplan refunded students the cost of tuition, books, and fees, and agreed to pay the program's graduates $9,000 stipends. Students claimed they were told the school would soon obtain ADA accreditation. The program had never been accredited by the American Dental Association, and had never been scheduled for the initial site visit required for accreditation.

In 2014, Kaplan agreed to voluntarily comply with the attorney general and made several required changes as part of the settlement. Kaplan agreed to "clearly and conspicuously disclose true and accurate information relating to the school's accreditation, program costs, financial aid, and the scope and nature of employment services they provide." During the course of the investigation, Kaplan waived $6 million in tuition and fees for more than 2,400 Florida students, and reimbursed the Florida Attorney General's office for attorney costs, while impacted students were offered retraining or a separate arbitration process. The office of Florida's attorney general, Pam Bondi, announced in June 2014 that an investigation, which focused on other for-profit institutions as well, found no violations by Kaplan.

In 2015, Kaplan paid $1.375 million to the Massachusetts Attorney General's office to resolve complaints that Kaplan engaged in "unfair or deceptive practices designed to induce enrollment of students" including "harassing sales tactics and false and misleading representations" in the operation of the Kaplan Career Institute campus in Boston, Massachusetts with $1 million going toward tuition refunds to 289 students, Acting U.S. Attorney Richard L. Durbin Jr. stated that the settlement was not an admission of liability by Kaplan or its affiliates, and that the company had fully cooperated with the government's investigation and negotiated the settlement in good faith. The settlement did not involve a finding of wrongdoing, and Kaplan stated that it resolved the legal challenge "due to the high cost of protracted litigation." In the same year, the United States Department of Justice began investigating Kaplan following a Qui tam suit filed by a whistleblower under the False Claims Act. The whistleblower alleged Kaplan employed unqualified instructors to teach Medical Assistant courses at its San Antonio campuses and knowingly requested, received, and retained federal funds for courses taught by individuals who did not meet the minimum requirements established by Texas law.

== Kaplan Educational Foundation (KEF) ==
The Kaplan Educational Foundation (KEF) is an independent 501(c)(3) charity that offers undergraduate and graduate educational scholarship opportunities and other assistance to community college students in the New York City area who are traditionally overlooked, underserved and underrepresented, including African American, Latino, and Native American students. KEF's Kaplan Leadership Program helps high-potential, low-income community college students from underrepresented communities complete their associate degrees and successfully transfer to the nation's most highly selective schools. Kaplan scholars receive a comprehensive array of financial and academic support, transfer admissions advising, and leadership skills development. The foundation partners with dozens of higher educational institutions around the United States.

The foundation's executive director, Nolvia Delgado, is a former Kaplan Leadership Program scholar, Borough of Manhattan Community College graduate and alumna of Smith College.

== Awards, rankings and honors ==
Kaplan has been received numerous awards and recognition for its businesses, products and services, including:

- Singapore's best employers 2022
- Fast Company's Best Workplaces for Innovators 2022: 10 Large Company Standouts
- PQ Magazine 2022 Shortlists: Study Resource of the Year, Innovation in Accountancy, Best Use of Social Media, Graduate/Apprentice Training Programme
- 1EdTech Learning Impact 2022 Honorable Mention, Kaplans MCAT Live Online course
- 2022 Digital Health Silver Awards, Health Resources Mobile Apps (Projects in Knowledge)
- Newsweek's 100 Most Loved Workplaces 2022
- Newsweek's 100 Most Loved Workplaces 2021
- Sun-Sentinel's South Florida Top Workplaces 2022
- Sun-Sentinel's South Florida Top Workplaces 2021
- Chicago Tribune's Best SAT Test Prep Book for 2021 and 2020
- PQ Magazine's Private Sector Accountancy College of the Year, 2021
- Learning Technologies 2021, Gold Award, Best Learning Game, Kaplan UK
- PQ Magazine Editor's Special Awards 2020, Kaplan Financial
- Learning Technologies 2020, Bronze Award, Best UK digital transformation of a training programme in response to COVID-19
- Chicago Tribune's Best MCAT Test Prep Book 2019
- Fast Company's Most Innovative Education Company 2014

== See also ==
- For-profit higher education in the United States
