= List of Phi Alpha Delta chapters =

Phi Alpha Delta is a North American professional fraternity for law that was established in 1902 in Chicago, Illinois. It absorbed the Phi Delta Delta women's law fraternity on August 12, 1972. Phi Alpha Delta has three types of chapters: law school, pre-law (undergraduate), and alumni (law school graduates and professionals).

== Law school chapters ==
The fraternity names its law school chapters for distinguished jurists and lawyers. Following is a list of Phi Alpha Delta's law school chapters, with inactive chapters and institutions in italics.

Chapter	Charter date and range	Institution	Location	Status	Ref.
William Blackstone	November 15, 1902	Chicago-Kent College of Law	Chicago, Illinois	Active	(Note: This chapter was originally a chapter of Lambda Epsilon, a local law fraternity established in 1897.)
Joseph Story	November 15, 1902	DePaul University College of Law	Chicago, Illinois	Active	
Daniel Webster	November 15, 1902	Loyola University Chicago School of Law	Chicago, Illinois	Active	
Melville W. Fuller	November 15, 1902	Pritzker School of Law	Chicago, Illinois	Active	(Note: Chapter formed at Northwestern University School of Law, now Northwestern University Pritzker School of Law.)
John Marshall	December 3, 1902	University of Chicago Law School	Chicago, Illinois	Active	
Benjamin D. Magruder	March 11, 1904	University of Illinois College of Law	Champaign, Illinois	Active	
Edward G. Ryan	March 11, 1904	University of Wisconsin Law School	Madison, Wisconsin	Active	
James V. Campbell	March 11, 1905	University of Michigan Law School	Ann Arbor, Michigan	Active	(Note: Absorbed the Alpha Sigma chapter of Phi Delta Delta in 1972.)
Augustus Hill Garland	April 28, 1906 – 1919; xxxx ?	University of Arkansas School of Law	Fayetteville, Arkansas	Active	
John Milton Hay	June 16, 1906	Case Western Reserve University Law School	Cleveland, Ohio	Active	(Note: Chapter formed at Western Reserve University School of Law, which became Case Western Reserve University Law School in 1967. It absorbed the Pi chapter of Phi Delta Delta in 1972.)
Thomas Hart Benton	July 6, 1907	University of Missouri–Kansas City School of Law	Kansas City, Missouri	Active	(Note: Absorbed the Psi chapter of Phi Delta Delta in 1972.)
Matthew Ignatius Sullivan	March 21, 1908 – 1927	Illinois Wesleyan University Law School	Bloomington, Illinois	Inactive; Reassigned	(Note: The chapter was originally called Charles L. Capen. The chapter closed when the university's law school went defunct in 1927. The chapter's name was reassigned to the University of San Francisco on February 19, 1938, but was eventually changed to Matt Sullivan on May 23, 1946.)
Salmon P. Chase	April 11, 1908	University of Cincinnati College of Law	Cincinnati, Ohio	Active	(Note: Absorbed the Alpha Beta chapter of Phi Delta Delta in 1972.)
George H. Williams	November 28, 1908 – 1919; >August 12, 1972 ?	University of Oregon School of Law	Eugene, Oregon	Active	(Note: Chapter closed due to anti-fraternity policies.) (Note: Chapter was revived by a merged with the Delta chapter of Phi Delta Delta, established in 1914.)
William G. Hammond	December 5, 1908	University of Iowa College of Law	Iowa City, Iowa	Active	
John D. Lawson	January 9, 1909 – before 1930; August 12, 1972 ?	University of Missouri School of Law	Columbia, Missouri	Active	(Note: Chapter's charter was withdrawn when the law school decreased its size. It was reformed in 1972 by absorbing the Mu chapter of Phi Delta Delta, originally established on January 21, 1922.)
Charles A. Rapallo	February 20, 1909 – before 1930; August 12, 1972 ? – xxxx ?	New York University School of Law	Manhattan, New York City, New York	Active	(Note: Chapter absorbed the Alpha Gamma chapter of Phi Delta Delta in 1972. The chapter's charter was withdrawn when the law school's standards were lowered.)
William Howard Taft	March 27, 1909	Georgetown University Law Center	Washington, D.C.	Active	(Note: Absorbed the Beta Lambda chapter of Phi Delta Delta in 1972.)
John C. Calhoun	March 30, 1909	Yale Law School	New Haven, Connecticut	Active	(Note: Absorbed the Alpha Tau chapter of Phi Delta Delta in 1972.)
James Woods Green	April 17, 1909	University of Kansas School of Law	Lawrence, Kansas	Active	(Note: Absorbed the Theta chapter of Phi Delta Delta in 1972.)
Thomas Jefferson	March 26, 1910	University of Virginia School of Law	Charlottesville, Virginia	Active	
Julius Gunter	April 29, 1910	University of Colorado Law School	Boulder, Colorado	Active	
Hannibal E. Hamlin	May 27, 1910 – 1919	University of Maine School of Law	Portland, Maine	Inactive, Reestablished	
Guy C. Corliss	February 25, 1911	University of North Dakota School of Law	Grand Forks, North Dakota	Active	
Erskine M. Ross	March 11, 1911	USC Gould School of Law	Los Angeles, California	Active	(Note: Chapter formed at the University of Southern California Law, which became USC Gould School of Law in the 1960s.) (Note: Absorbed the Alpha chapter of Phi Delta Delta in 1972.)
Stephen J. Field	May 13, 1911	UC Berkeley School of Law	Berkeley, California	Active	(Note: Absorbed the Beta Beta chapter of Phi Delta Delta in 1972.)
Jackson Temple	May 13, 1911	University of California College of the Law, San Francisco	San Francisco, California	Active	(Note: Chapter formed at the University of California, Hastings College of Law, which became the University of California College of the Law, San Francisco in 2024.)
Oliver Wendell Holmes	May 13, 1911	Stanford Law School	Stanford, California	Active	(Note: Absorbed the Beta Delta chapter of Phi Delta Delta in 1972.)
Waller R. Staples	January 13, 1912	Washington and Lee University School of Law	Lexington, Virginia	Active	
Charles J. Hughes, Jr.	May 24, 1913	Sturm College of Law	Denver, Colorado	Active	(Note: Chapter formed at the University of Denver College of Law, which became the Sturm College of Law in 2003.)
Henry Clay	May 14, 1914	University of Kentucky College of Law	Lexington, Kentucky	Active	
William E. Borah	May 26, 1914	University of Idaho College of Law	Moscow. Idaho	Active	(Note: This chapter was previously called James Kent.)
Ralph O. Dunbar	May 25, 1914	University of Washington School of Law	Seattle, Washington	Active	(Note: Absorbed the Epsilon chapter of Phi Delta Delta in 1972.)
Manoah B. Reese	March 12, 1915	University of Nebraska College of Law	Lincoln, Nebraska	Active	
David J. Brewer	April 3, 1915	Stetson University College of Law	Gulfport, Florida	Active	(Note: Absorbed the Rho chapter of Phi Delta Delta in 1972.)
Edward T. Sanford	May 25, 1916	University of Tennessee College of Law	Knoxville, Tennessee	Active	(Note: Chapter was formed as the James Clark McReynolds and was changed to Edward T. Sanford in January 2016. It absorbed the Beta Rho chapter of Phi Delta Delta in 1972.)
John Marshall Harlan	May 20, 1916	University of Oklahoma College of Law	Norman, Oklahoma	Active	
Robert Livingston	May 31, 1916	Columbia Law School	New York City, New York	Active	(Note: Absorbed the Alpha Mu chapter of Phi Delta Delta in 1972.)
Bertha R. MacLean	January 24, 1920	New England Law Boston	Boston, Massachusetts	Active	(Note: Chapter viewed by Phi Delta Delta as rechartering of Eta chapter of Phi Alpha Delta chartered in 1920, which had gone inactive before the merger. Bertha R. MacLean chapter of Phi Delta chapter rechartered on March 11, 1974. Chapter formed at the New England School of Law, which became the New England Law Boston in 2008)
John Jay	June 5, 1920	George Washington University Law School	Washington, D.C.	Active	(Note: Absorbed the Zeta chapter of Phi Delta Delta in 1972.)
Alfred W. Benson	February 26, 1921	Washburn University School of Law	Topeka, Kansas	Active	(Note: Absorbed the Kappa chapter of Phi Delta Delta in 1972.)
Chester C. Cole	April 23, 1921	Drake University Law School	Des Moines, Iowa	Active	
William McKinley	April 23, 1921	Ohio State University Moritz College of Law	Columbus, Ohio	Active	
Thomas Ruffin	April 30, 1921	University of North Carolina School of Law	Chapel Hill, North Carolina	Active	
Horace H. Lurton	May 14, 1921	Vanderbilt University Law School	Nashville, Tennessee	Active	(Note: Absorbed the Iota chapter of Phi Delta Delta in 1972.)
Champ Clark	May 6, 1922	Washington University School of Law	St. Louis, Missouri	Active	
William Mitchell	June 10, 1922	University of Minnesota Law School	Minneapolis, Minnesota	Active	
Philander C. Knox	May 20, 1923	James E. Rogers College of Law	Tucson, Arizona	Active	(Note: Chapter formed at the University of Arizona College of Law, which became the James E. Rogers College of Law in 1999.)
Duncan U. Fletcher	January 12, 1924	University of Florida Levin College of Law	Gainesville, Florida	Active	(Note: Absorbed the Beta Zeta chapter of Phi Delta Delta in 1972.)
Francis Xavier Martin	December 13, 1924	Tulane University School of Law	New Orleans, Louisiana	Active	
William P. Willey	February 14, 1925	West Virginia University College of Law	Morgantown, West Virginia	Active	
David T. Watson	May 9, 1925	University of Pittsburgh School of Law	Pittsburgh, Pennsylvania	Active	(Note: Absorbed the Lambda chapter of Phi Delta Delta in 1972.)
Woodrow Wilson	October 17, 1925	Cornell Law School	Ithaca, New York	Active	
George Sutherland	February 20, 1926	S.J. Quinney College of Law	Salt Lake City, Utah	Active	(Note: Chapter formed at University of Utah Law School, which became the S.J. Quinney College of Law on November 2, 2001. It absorbed the Alpha Pi chapter of Phi Delta Delta in 1972.)
William Albert Keener	May 7, 1927	Emory University School of Law	Atlanta, Georgia	Active	
William Hansel Fish	March 3, 1928	Mercer University School of Law	Macon, Georgia	Active	
Joshua M. Morse III	June 1, 1929	University of Mississippi School of Law	University, Mississippi	Active	(Note: Chapter was originally named Lucius Quintus Cincinnatus Lamar but was changed to Joshua M. Morse III on February 25, 2021. It absorbed the Beta Gamma chapter of Phi Delta Delta in 1972.)
Roger Brooke Taney	May 28, 1932	Dedman School of Law	Dallas, Texas	Active	(Note: Chapter formed at Southern Methodist University School of Law, which became the Dedman School of Law in February 2001.)
Fred M. Vinson	May 1, 1935	University of Louisville School of Law	Louisville, Kentucky	Active	(Note: Absorbed the Alpha Iota chapter of Phi Delta Delta in 1972.)
William Joseph Ford	September 13, 1937	Loyola Law School	Los Angeles, California	Active	
Matthew Sullivan	February 19, 1938	University of San Francisco School of Law	San Francisco, California	Active	
Owen W. Roberts	June 15, 1939	Temple University Beasley School of Law	Philadelphia, Pennsylvania	Active	(Note: Absorbed the Tau chapter of Phi Delta Delta in 1972.)
Wiley Blount Rutledge	October 2, 1946	Duke University School of Law	Durham, North Carolina	Active	
Richard A. Rasco	November 23, 1946	University of Miami School of Law	Coral Gables, Florida	Active	(Note: Absorbed the Alpha Phi chapter of Phi Delta Delta in 1972.)
Alexander H. Stephens	August 5, 1947	University of Georgia School of Law	Athens, Georgia	Active	(Note: Absorbed the Beta Eta chapter of Phi Delta Delta in 1972.)
Tom C. Clark	August 8, 1947	University of Texas School of Law	Austin, Texas	Active	
Edgar W. Timberlake	October 17, 1947	Wake Forest University School of Law	Winston-Salem, North Carolina	Active	
Charles A. Halleck	December 14, 1947 – 2020	Valparaiso University School of Law	Valparaiso, Indiana	Inactive	(Note: Valparaiso University School of Law closed after the class of 2020 graduated.)
Ralph Hamill	May 8, 1948	Indiana University Robert H. McKinney School of Law	Indianapolis, Indiana	Active	(Note: Chapter formed at Indiana University School of Law – Indianapolis, which became the Indiana University Robert H. McKinney School of Law in May 2001. It absorbed the Alpha Xi chapter of Phi Delta Delta in 1972.)
Patrick Henry	October 29, 1948	University of Richmond, School of Law	Richmond, Virginia	Active	(Note: Absorbed the Beta Iota chapter of Phi Delta Delta in 1972.)
John L. Sullivan	May 14, 1949	Saint Louis University School of Law	St. Louis, Missouri	Active	(Note: Chapter was originally called Charles L. Capen. It absorbed the Alpha Upsilon chapter of Phi Delta Delta in 1972.)
Cordell Hull	July 29, 1949	Cumberland School of Law	Birmingham, Alabama	Active	(Note: Absorbed the Beta Phi chapter of Phi Delta Delta in 1972.)
R. E. B. Baylor	August 2, 1949	Baylor Law School	Waco, Texas	Active	
Charles Cotesworth Pinckney	November 30, 1949	University of South Carolina	Columbia, South Carolina	Active	
Thomas More	March 30, 1950	Creighton University School of Law	Omaha, Nebraska	Inactive	
Theodore Brantly	April 21, 1950	Alexander Blewett III School of Law	Missoula, Montana	Active	(Note: Chapter formed at the University of Montana Law School, which became the Alexander Blewett III School of Law in 2015.)
Joseph McKenna	May 15, 1951	UCLA School of Law	Los Angeles, California	Active	(Note: Absorbed the Beta Theta chapter of Phi Delta Delta in 1972.)
Abraham Lincoln	April 12, 1953	University of Illinois Chicago School of Law	Chicago, Illinois	Active	(Note: Chapter formed at the John Marshall Law School, which merged with the University of Illinois at Chicago in 2019 and became the University of Illinois Chicago School of Law on July 1, 2021.)
George Wythe	May 23, 1953	William & Mary Law School	Williamsburg, Virginia	Active	
Summers Hardy	January 30, 1954	University of Tulsa College of Law	Tulsa, Oklahoma	Active	(Note: Absorbed the Alpha Omicron chapter in Phi Delta Delta in 1972.)
John Doyle Carmody	October 29, 1954	Syracuse University College of Law	Syracuse, New York	Active	
Fredrick L. Hoffman	May 6, 1955	Salmon P. Chase College of Law	Highland Heights, Kentucky	Active	(Note: Absorbed the Beta Kappa chapter of Phi Delta Delta in 1972.)
Robert H. Jackson	May 18, 1955	Rutgers Law School, Newark	Newark, New York	Active	
Henry deBracton	June 8, 1957	St. John's University School of Law	Jamaica, Queens, New York City, New York	Active	(Note: Absorbed the Alpha Rho chapter in Phi Delta Delta in 1972.)
Clarence Darrow	May 29, 1958	University of Maryland Francis King Carey School of Law	Baltimore, Maryland	Active	(Note: Absorbed the Alpha Delta chapter of Phi Delta Delta in 1972.)
Thomas M. Cooley	May 16, 1959	Wayne State University Law School	Detroit, Michigan	Active	(Note: Absorbed the Alpha Kappa chapter of Phi Delta Delta in 1972.)
Samuel Houston	May 30, 1959	South Texas College of Law Houston	Houston, Texas	Active	
Edward Coke	March 5, 1960	University of Toledo College of Law	Toledo, Ohio	Active	
Frank B. Willis	June 4, 1960	Claude W. Pettit College of Law	Ada, Ohio	Active	
Edgar S. Vaught	December 3, 1960	Oklahoma City University School of Law	Oklahoma City, Oklahoma	Active	
Louis Dembitz Brandeis	December 17, 1960	American University Washington College of Law	Washington, D.C.	Active	(Note: Absorbed the Beta chapter of Phi Delta Delta in 1972.)
Paul J. McCormick	May 12, 1961	University of San Diego School of Law	San Diego, California	Active	(Note: Absorbed the Beta Omicron chapter of Phi Delta Delta in 1972.)
Charles R. Grant	February 27, 1962	University of Akron School of Law	Akron, Ohio	Active	(Note: Absorbed the Beta Xi chapter of Phi Delta Delta in 1972.)
Campbell E. Beaumont	April 13, 1962	California Western School of Law	San Diego, California	Active	(Note: Absorbed the Beta Nu chapter of Phi Delta Delta in 1972.)
David C. Meck	April 29, 1962	Cleveland State University College of Law	Cleveland, Ohio	Active	(Note: Absorbed the Alpha Nu chapter of Phi Delta Delta in 1972.)
Pierce Butler	May 12, 1962 – December 2015	William Mitchell College of Law	Saint Paul, Minnesota	Merged	(Note: Hamline University School of Law merged into William Mitchell College of Law on December 9, 2015, and became the Mitchell Hamline School of Law. As a result, the James Monroe chapter merged with the Pierce Butler chapter to form the Wahl chapter.) (Note: Absorbed the Alpha Epsilon Psi chapter of Phi Delta Delta in 1972.)
Benjamin Nathan Cardozo	June 8, 1962	Catholic University of America Columbus School of Law	Washington, D.C.	Active	(Note: Absorbed the Beta Epsilon chapter of Phi Delta Delta in 1972.)
John P. Egan	March 21, 1963 – 19xx ?; April 29, 1995	Thomas R. Kline School of Law of Duquesne University	Pittsburgh, Pennsylvania	Active	(Note: Chapter formed at Duquesne University School of Law, which became the Thomas R. Kline School of Law of Duquesne University on September 7, 2022. It absorbed the Chi chapter of Phi Delta Delta in 1972.)
Edward Douglass White	May 5, 1963	Paul M. Hebert Law Center	Baton Rouge, Louisiana	Active	(Note: Chapter formed at Louisiana State University Law Center, which became the Paul M. Hebert Law Center in 1979. It absorbed the Alpha Omega chapter of Phi Delta Delta in 1972.)
John Edward Hickman	May 11, 1963	University of Houston Law Center	Houston, Texas	Active	
I. Maurice Wormser	April 21, 1964	Fordham University School of Law	Manhattan, New York City, New York	Active	(Note: Absorbed the Alpha Alpha chapter of Phi Delta Delta in 1972.)
William Paterson	May 7, 1964	Seton Hall University School of Law	Newark, New Jersey	Active	
Harold Hitz Burton	May 8, 1965	Boston University School of Law	Boston, Massachusetts	Active	
Felix Frankfurter	May 8, 1965	Suffolk University Law School	Boston, Massachusetts	Active	
Charles A. O'Niell	December 4, 1965	Loyola University School of Law	New Orleans, Louisiana	Active	(Note: Absorbed the Alpha Zeta chapter of Phi Delta Delta in 1972.)
John Adams	February 26, 1966	Indiana University Maurer School of Law	Bloomington, Indiana	Active	(Note: Chapter formed at the Indiana University School of Law-Bloomington, which became Indiana University Maurer School of Law in 2008.)
Theodore Frelinghuysen	March 22, 1966	Rutgers Law School, Camden	Camden, New Jersey	Active	
Douglas L. Edmonds	April 16, 1966	Santa Clara University School of Law	Santa Clara, California	Active	
Robert Marion La Follette	May 15, 1966 – 200x ?; November 6, 2006	Marquette University Law School	Milwaukee, Wisconsin	Active	
Kenneth Douglas McKellar	May 28, 1966	Cecil C. Humphreys School of Law	Memphis, Tennessee	Active	(Note: Chapter formed at Memphis State University College of Law, now called the Cecil C. Humphreys School of Law. It absorbed the Alpha Chi chapter of Phi Delta Delta in 1972.)
John Mercer Langston	November 19, 1966	Howard University School of Law	Washington, D.C.	Active	
Joseph Taylor Robinson	November 4, 1967	William H. Bowen School of Law	Little Rock, Arkansas	Active	
Edward M. Connelly	January 27, 1968	Gonzaga University School of Law	Spokane, Washington	Active	
Frank Murphy	May 17, 1968	University of Detroit Mercy School of Law	Detroit, Michigan	Active	(Note: Chapter formed at the Detroit Law School, which changed its name when the University of Detroit merged with Mercy College of Detroit in 1990.)
William Glenn Terrell	May 18, 1968	Florida State University College of Law	Tallahassee, Florida	Active	
Carlos C. Alden	December 7, 1968	University at Buffalo Law School	Amherst, New York	Active	(Note: Chapter formed at the State University of New York at Buffalo Law School, now called the University at Buffalo Law School. It absorbed the Sigma chapter of Phi Delta Delta in 1972.)
Rutherford B. Hayes	February 22, 1969	Capital University Law School	Columbus, Ohio	Active	
John A. Macdonald	March 14, 1969	University of Windsor Faculty of Law	Windsor, Ontario, Canada	Active	
José de Diego	April 25, 1969	Pontifical Catholic University of Puerto Rico School of Law	Ponce, Puerto Rico	Active	
Clair Engle	May 9, 1969	McGeorge School of Law	Sacramento, California	Active	
Sam Taliaferro Rayburn	September 6, 1969	Texas Tech University School of Law	Lubbock, Texas	Active	
Barbara C. Jordan	December 6, 1969	Texas Southern University	Houston, Texas	Active	(Note: Originally chartered as Richard Theodore Greener chapter)
John Nance Garner	November 8, 1970	St. Mary's University School of Law	San Antonio, Texas	Active	
Arthur Sammis	December 5, 1970	Southwestern Law School	Los Angeles, California	Active	(Note: Absorbed the Beta Alpha chapter of Phi Delta Delta in 1972.)
Raymond Watkins	April 24, 1971	North Carolina Central University School of Law	Durham, North Carolina	Active	
Hugo L. Black	February 11, 1972	Sandra Day O'Connor College of Law	Tempe, Arizona	Active	(Note: Chapter formed at the Arizona State University College of Law, which became the Sandra Day O'Connor College of Law in 2006.)
Everett Dirksen	February 25, 1972	Golden Gate University School of Law	San Francisco, California	Active	
Benito Juarez	February 26, 1972	University of California, Davis School of Law	Davis, California	Active	
John Tyler Morgan	April 28, 1972	University of Alabama School of Law	Tuscaloosa, Alabama	Active	(Note: Absorbed the Beta Mu chapter of Phi Delta Delta in 1972.)
Karl N. Llewellyn	April 29, 1972	Lewis & Clark Law School	Portland, Oregon	Active	(Note: Chapter was originally chartered as James F. Byrnes chapter. It absorbed the Xi chapter of Phi Delta Delta in 1972.)
Harold Shepherd	November 17, 1972	Pepperdine University School of Law	Malibu, California	Active	
J. Harry LaBrum	January 19, 1973	University of Baltimore	Baltimore, Maryland	Active	
William F. Starr	April 29, 1973	University of Connecticut School of Law	Hartford, Connecticut	Active	
Matthew Baillie Begbie	February 10, 1974	Peter A. Allard School of Law	Vancouver, British Columbia, Canada	Active	(Note: Chapter formed at the University of British Columbia Faculty of Law, which became the Peter A. Allard School of Law in 2015. It was the re-establishment of the Omega chapter of Phi Delta Delta, originally chartered on January 30, 1926, but inactive at the time of the merger of the two fraternities.)
Harry S Truman	March 2, 1974	Seattle University School of Law	Seattle, Washington	Active	
Matthew Cowley	April 13, 1974	J. Reuben Clark Law School	Provo, Utah	Active	
William J. Kenealy	April 26, 1974	Boston College Law School	Newton, Massachusetts	Active	
Arthur Middleton	April 28, 1974	Western New England University School of Law	Springfield, Massachusetts	Active	
Stephen A. Douglas	May 2, 1974	Southern Illinois University School of Law	Carbondale, Illinois	Active	
Frank R. Kenison	May 17, 1974	Franklin Pierce School of Law	Concord, New Hampshire	Active	(Note: Chapter formed at the Franklin Pierce Law Center, which became the Franklin Pierce School of Law when it affiliated with the University of New Hampshire in 2010.)
Mary Vashti Burr	March 7, 1975	Penn State Dickinson Law	Carlisle, Pennsylvania	Active	(Note: They re-established the Omicron chapter of Phi Delta Delta, which was established on May 18, 1923, but had gone inactive before the merger of the two fraternities.) (Note: Chapter formed at the Dickinson School of Law which merged with Penn State in 2000, forming Penn State's Dickinson School of Law. That split into two law schools in 2014, with the former Dickinson campus in Carlisle becoming Penn State Dickinson Law and the University Park campus becoming Penn State Law.)
James Monroe	May 24, 1975 – December 2015	Hamline University School of Law	Saint Paul, Minnesota	Merged	
Chester A. Arthur	May 30, 1975	Vermont Law and Graduate School	South Royalton, Vermont	Active	
Isaac P. Christiancy	September 21, 1975	Thomas M. Cooley Law School -Lansing Campus	Lansing, Michigan	Active	
Morrison Waite	November 14, 1975	University of Dayton School of Law	Dayton, Ohio	Active	
George Read	November 15, 1975	Widener University Delaware Law School	Wilmington, Delaware	Active	(Note: Chapter formed at the Delaware Law School, which became Widener University School of Law in 1985 and Widener University Delaware Law School in 2015.)
Thomas F. Fleming	November 22, 1975	Shepard Broad College of Law	Fort Lauderdale, Florida	Active	(Note: Chapter formed at Nova Southeastern University College of Law, which became Shepard Broad College of Law in 1989.)
Luis Muñoz Morales	April 17, 1976	Interamerican University of Puerto Rico School of Law	San Juan, Puerto Rico	Active	
John F. Kennedy	November 6, 1976	Maurice A. Deane School of Law	Hempstead, New York	Active	(Note: Chapter formed at Hofstra University School of Law, which became the Maurice A. Deane School of Law in September 2011.)
Samuel Jones Tilden	November 20, 1976	New York Law School	Manhattan, New York City, New York	Active	(Note: This was the re-establishment of the Beta Sigma chapter of Phi Delta Delta, originally chartered on May 1, 1968, but inactive at the time of the merger of the two fraternities in 1972.)
Fiorello Henry LaGuardia	January 30, 1977	Brooklyn Law School	Brooklyn, New York	Active	(Note: This was a re-establishment of the Nu chapter of Phi Delta Delta, originally chartered on May 7, 1922, but inactive when the two fraternities merged in 1972.)
William J. Hoynes	May 14, 1977	Notre Dame Law School	Notre Dame, Indiana	Active	
James A. Dooley	April 1, 1978	Northern Illinois University College of Law	DeKalb, Illinois	Active	(Note: Chapter was formed in Glen Ellyn, Illinois at the Lewis University College of Law, which became part of Northern Illinois University in August 1979. It moved to the DeKalb campus in 1982.)
Hubert Humphrey (First)	May 18, 1978 – 1997	Detroit College of Law	Detroit, Michigan	Moved	(Note: The Detroit College of Law affiliated with Michigan State University in 1995 and moved to East Lansing in 1997.)
Hubert Humphrey (Second)	1997	Michigan State University College of Law	East Lansing, Michigan	Active	
Albert Lee Stephens Sr.	February 25, 1979 – 2017	Whittier Law School	Los Angeles, California	Inactive	(Note: chapter originally named Charles Evans Whittaker Chapter, changed to Albert Lee Stevens in 1982. Whittier Law School closed in 2017.)
Nelson A. Rockefeller	March 25, 1979	Albany Law School	Albany, New York	Active	
Adolf Homburger	April 6, 1979	Pace University School of Law	White Plains, New York	Active	
James M. Doyle	April 7, 1979	University of South Dakota School of Law	Vermillion, South Dakota	Active	(Note: This was the re-establishment of the Alpha Eta chapter of Phi Delta Delta, originally chartered on October 29, 1927, and the Beta Upsilon chapter, established on May 16, 1969. Both chapters were inactive at the time of the merger of the two fraternities in 1972.)
James Iredell	May 18, 1979	Norman Adrian Wiggins School of Law	Raleigh, North Carolina	Active	(Note: Chapter formed at the Campbell University School of Law in Buies Creek, North Carolina, now the Norman Adrian Wiggins School of Law. It moved to Raleigh in September 2009.)
Ignacio L. Vallarta	October 5, 1979	Universidad Regiomontana	Monterrey, Nuevo León, Mexico	Active	
Alexander P. Tureaud	February 29, 1980	Southern University Law Center	Baton Rouge, Louisiana	Active	
William O. Douglas (First)	April 12, 1980 – 1992	University of Bridgeport Law School	Bridgeport, Connecticut	Moved	(Note: The Law School seceded from the University of Bridgeport in 1992, becoming the Quinnipiac University School of Law.) (Note: Originally chartered as Benjamin Curtiss chapter)
William O. Douglas (Second)	1992	Quinnipiac University School of Law	North Haven, Connecticut	Active	(Note: The School of Law's physical address is in North Haven, Connecticut, while its mailing address is Hamden, Connecticut.)
Allard Lowenstein	May 6, 1980	Benjamin N. Cardozo School of Law	New York City, New York	Active	
Virgil A. Griffith	October 11, 1980	Mississippi College School of Law	Jackson, Mississippi	Active	
Hall S. Lusk	March 29, 1981	Willamette University College of Law	Salem, Oregon	Active	(Note: Chapter re-established the Upsilon chapter of Phi Delta Delta, originally established on May 29, 1924, but inactive when the two fraternities merged in 1972.)
George Lewis Ruffin	November 14, 1981	Harvard Law School	Cambridge, Massachusetts	Active	
Judah Touro	November 27, 1983	Touro College Jacob D. Fuchsberg Law Center	Huntington, New York	Active	
Fred H. Blume	April 11, 1984	University of Wyoming College of Law	Laramie, Wyoming	Active	
Ernesto Ramos-Antonini	April 27, 1984	University of Puerto Rico School of Law	Rio Piedras, San Juan, Puerto Rico	Active	
Richard B. Russell	May 5, 1984	Georgia State University College of Law	Atlanta, Georgia	Active	
Pauli Murray	May 19, 1987	City University of New York School of Law	Long Island City, New York City, New York	Active	
John B. McManus Jr.	November 6, 1987	University of New Mexico School of Law	Albuquerque, New Mexico	Active	
Soia Mentschikoff	May 5, 1988	Benjamin L. Crump College of Law	Miami Gardens, Florida	Active	(Note: Chapter formed at the Saint Thomas University School of Law, now the Benjamin L. Crump College of Law.)
Claude Pepper	April 27, 1990	Widener University Commonwealth Law School	Harrisburg, Pennsylvania	Active	
George Mason	October 14, 1992	Antonin Scalia Law School	Arlington, Virginia	Active	(Note: Chapter formed at the George Mason University School of Law, which became the Antonin Scalia Law School in 2016.)
Harry Glassman	April 27, 1994	University of Maine School of Law	Portland, Maine	Active	
Francisco H. Ruiz	May 16, 1994	University of Guadalajara	Guadalajara, Jalisco, Mexico	Active	
Venustiano Carranza	May 24, 1994	Autonomous University of Nuevo León School of Law	San Nicolás de los Garza, Nuevo León, Mexico	Active	
Benjamin Franklin	April 12, 1997	Thomas Jefferson School of Law	San Diego, California	Active	
James Madison	March 28, 1998	Roger Williams University School of Law	Bristol, Rhode Island	Active	
Martin Luther King Jr.	February 11, 1999	Villanova University School of Law	Villanova, Pennsylvania	Active	
K. M. Van Zandt	April 27, 2000	Texas A&M University School of Law	Fort Worth, Texas	Active	(Note: Chapter formed at the Texas Wesleyan University School of Law, which was acquired by Texas A&M University on August 12, 2013. It is now called the Texas A&M University School of Law.)
Louis Wiener Jr.	April 14, 2001	William S. Boyd School of Law	Las Vegas, Nevada	Active	
Warren E. Burger	May 19, 2001	Western State College of Law, Fullerton Campus	Fullerton, California	Active	
L. Anthony Sutin	March 16, 2002	Appalachian School of Law	Grundy, Virginia	Active	
Jean Cahn	October 18, 2002	David A. Clarke School of Law	Washington, D.C.	Active	
Myra C. Bradwell	November 2, 2002	Dwayne O. Andreas School of Law	Orlando, Florida	Active	
Robert P. Casey	November 8, 2003	Ave Maria School of Law	Naples, Florida	Active	(Note: school originally located in Ann Arbor Michigan and moved to Naples, Florida in 2009)
John Innes Clark Hare	February 24, 2004	University of Pennsylvania Law School	Philadelphia, Pennsylvania	Active	
Charles E. Whittaker	March 20, 2004	Chapman University Dale E. Fowler School of Law	Orange, California	Active	
Gwendolyn Sawyer Cherry	January 13, 2005	Florida A&M University College of Law	Orlando, Florida	Active	
Donald Lee Hollowell	March 31, 2005	Atlanta's John Marshall Law School	Atlanta, Georgia	Active	
Frank B. Kellogg	April 27, 2005	University of St. Thomas School of Law	Minneapolis, Minnesota	Active	
Charlotte E. Ray	March 24, 2006	Northeastern University School of Law	Boston, Massachusetts	Active	
John W. Holland	June 17, 2006	Florida International University College of Law	Miami, Florida	Active	
Albert Patterson	November 10, 2006	Thomas Goode Jones School of Law	Montgomery, Alabama	Active	
Clement Furman Haynsworth Jr.	February 26, 2007	Charleston School of Law	Charleston, South Carolina	Active	
George Washington	February 22, 2008	Regent University School of Law	Virginia Beach, Virginia	Active	
Barry Goldwater Sr.	March 28, 2008 – 2018	Arizona Summit Law School	Phoenix, Arizona	Inactive	(Note: Chapter formed at the Phoenix School of Law, which became the Arizona Summit Law School in 2013. The law school closed in 2018.)
Thomas Mifflin	October 7, 2008	Thomas R. Kline School of Law	Philadelphia, Pennsylvania	Active	
William Penn	January 30, 2009	Penn State Law	University Park, Pennsylvania	Active	
Abraham Alexander	February 20, 2009 – August 10, 2017 ?	Charlotte School of Law	Charlotte, North Carolina	Inactive	
William Hooper	March 13, 2009	Elon University School of Law	Elon, North Carolina	Active	
Harold S. Sawyer	April 27, 2009	Thomas M. Cooley Law School - Grand Rapids Campus	Grand Rapids, Michigan	Inactive	
Eunice Kennedy Shriver	October 17, 2009	University of La Verne College of Law	Ontario, California	Active	
Howard Soifer	June 17, 2010	Thomas M. Cooley Law School - Auburn Hills Campus	Grand Rapids, Michigan	Inactive	
Sarah Kilgore Wertman	March 19, 2011	Thomas M. Cooley Law School - Ann Arbor Campus	Ann Arbor, Michigan	Inactive	
Thomas Telfair	October 24, 2014	Savannah Law School	Savannah, Georgia	Inactive	
Robert H. Watson Jr.	October 23, 2015	Duncan School of Law at Lincoln Memorial University	Knoxville, Tennessee	Active	
Rosalie E. Wahl	May 31, 2016	Mitchell Hamline School of Law	Saint Paul, Minnesota	Active	
Janet Reno	May 26, 2017	Thomas M. Cooley Law School -	Riverview, Florida	Active	
Frank G. Clement	November 9, 2023	Belmont University College of Law	Nashville, Tennessee	Active	
Rose E. Bird	November 18, 2023	National University JFK School of Law	San Diego, California	Active	
Elbert P. Tuttle	July 7, 2024	Purdue Global Law School	Los Angeles, California	Active	

== Pre-law chapters ==
Following are the pre-law chapters of Phi Alpha Delta, with active chapters indicated in bold and inactive chapters and institutions in italics.

Chapter	Charter date and range	Institution	Location	Status	Ref.
	April 30, 1999	Adelphi University	Garden City, New York	Active	
		Alabama State University	Montgomery, Alabama	Active	
		Albion College	Albion, Michigan	Active	
		Allegheny College	Meadville, Pennsylvania	Active	
		American Public University System	Virtual	Active	
	December 9, 1999	American University	Washington, D.C.	Active	
	2007	Appalachian State University	Boone, North Carolina	Active	
	November 7, 1984	Arizona State University	Tempe, Arizona	Active	
	November 1, 1990	Barry University	Miami Shores, Florida	Active	
	October 28, 1997	Baylor University	Waco, Texas	Active	
	April 9, 2025	Belmont University	Nashville, Tennessee	Active	
		Bethune–Cookman University	Daytona Beach, Florida	Active	
	December 6, 1990	Binghamton University	Vestal, New York	Active	
		Birmingham–Southern College	Birmingham, Alabama	Inactive	
		Boston University	Boston, Massachusetts	Active	
	March 3, 1984	Bowling Green State University	Bowling Green, Ohio	Active	
	October 20, 1994	Bradley University	Peoria, Illinois	Active	
	April 21, 1994	Briarcliffe College	Long Island, New York	Inactive	
		California Polytechnic State University, San Luis Obispo	San Luis Obispo, California	Active	
	May 18, 1984	California State University, Dominguez Hills	Carson, California	Active	
		California State University, East Bay	Hayward, California	Active	
		California State University, Fresno	Fresno, California	Active	
		California State University, Long Beach	Long Beach, California	Active	
	November 14, 1998	California State University, Los Angeles	Los Angeles, California	Active	
		California State University, Northridge	Los Angeles, California	Active	
	December 4, 1984	California State University, Sacramento	Sacramento, California	Active	
		Campbell University	Buies Creek, North Carolina	Active	
	November 18, 1983	Canisius University	Buffalo, New York	Active	
	May 1, 1983	Capital University	Bexley, Ohio	Active	
	April 28, 1996	Carthage College	Kenosha, Wisconsin	Active	
		Case Western Reserve University	Cleveland, Ohio	Active	
	April 18, 1984	Catholic University of America	Washington, D.C.	Active	
	February 19, 1991	Central Methodist University	Fayette, Missouri	Active	
	February 2, 1987	Central Michigan University	Mount Pleasant, Michigan	Active	
		Chapman University	Orange, California	Active	
	September 13, 1996	Charleston Southern University	North Charleston, South Carolina	Active	
	April 30, 1999	Christopher Newport University	Newport News, Virginia	Active	
		Claflin University	Orangeburg, South Carolina	Active	
		Clark Atlanta University	Atlanta, Georgia	Active	
	April 26, 1990	Clemson University	Clemson, South Carolina	Active	
		Cleveland State University	Cleveland, Ohio	Active	
	April 22, 1986	Coastal Carolina University	Conway, South Carolina	Active	
		Coe College	Cedar Rapids, Iowa	Active	
		College of Saint Rose	Albany, New York	Active	
	January 24, 1998	College of William & Mary	Williamsburg, Virginia	Active	
	April 5, 2000	Columbia College	Columbia, Missouri	Active	
		Columbus State University	Columbus, Georgia	Active	
	March 31, 2001	Concord University	Athens, West Virginia	Active	
		Cornell College	Mount Vernon, Iowa	Active	
		Cornell University	Ithaca, New York	Active	
		Denison University	Granville, Ohio	Active	
	April 7, 1984	DePaul University	Chicago, Illinois	Active	
		Dominican University of California	San Rafael, California	Active	
	May 5, 1982	Drury University	Springfield, Missouri	Active	
		Duke University	Durham, North Carolina	Active	
		East Carolina University	Greenville, North Carolina	Active	
		Eastern Illinois University	Charleston, Illinois	Active	
		Eastern New Mexico University	Portales, New Mexico	Active	
	November 10, 1988	Elgin Community College	Elgin, Illinois	Active	
		Elon University	Elon, North Carolina	Active	
	October 9, 1992	Fairleigh Dickinson University	Madison, New Jersey	Active	
	March 24, 1992	Ferris State University	Big Rapids, Michigan	Active	
	November 17, 1998	Flagler College	St. Augustine, Florida	Active	
	December 1, 2001	Florida A&M University	Tallahassee, Florida	Active	
		Florida Atlantic University	Boca Raton, Florida	Active	
	August 5, 1999	Florida Atlantic University, Davie Campus	Davie, Florida	Active	
	2008	Florida Gulf Coast University	Fort Myers, Florida	Active	
	April 10, 1999	Florida International University	Westchester, Florida	Active	
		Florida Southern College	Lakeland, Florida	Active	
	April 8, 1995	Florida State University	Tallahassee, Florida	Active	
		Fort Valley State University	Fort Valley, Georgia	Active	
	February 3, 1998	Gannon University	Erie, Pennsylvania	Active	
	October 4, 1992	George Mason University	Fairfax County, Virginia	Active	
	April 18, 1984	George Washington University	Washington, D.C.	Active	
	November 9, 2001	Georgetown University	Washington, D.C.	Active	
		Georgia College & State University	Milledgeville, Georgia	Inactive	
	November 20, 2000	Georgia Tech	Atlanta, Georgia	Active	
		Georgia Southern University	Statesboro, Georgia	Active	
		Georgia Southern University–Armstrong Campus	Savannah, Georgia	Active	
	October 25, 1998	Georgia State University	Atlanta, Georgia	Active	
	August 15, 1986	Golden Gate University	San Francisco, California	Active	
	January 22, 2000	Hamline University	Saint Paul, Minnesota	Active	
		Hampden–Sydney College	Hampden Sydney, Virginia	Active	
		Hampton University	Hampton, Virginia	Active	
	March 5, 1992	Hardin–Simmons University	Abilene, Texas	Active	
		High Point University	High Point, North Carolina	Active	
	October 25, 1996	Hillsdale College	Hillsdale, Michigan	Active	
	December 7, 1989	Hofstra University	Hempstead, New York	Active	
		Hood College	Frederick, Maryland	Active	
	March 2, 2001	Houston Christian University	Houston, Texas	Active	
		Howard University	Washington, D.C.	Active	
	February 20, 1996	Illinois College	Jacksonville, Illinois	Active	
	January 28, 1990	Illinois State University	Normal, Illinois	Active	
	April 11, 1984	Indiana University Bloomington	Bloomington, Indiana	Active	
		Indiana University of Pennsylvania	Indiana, Pennsylvania	Active	
	November 13, 1998	Indiana University–Purdue University Indianapolis	Indianapolis, Indiana	Inactive	
	December 2, 1988	Interamerican University of Puerto Rico	San Germán, Puerto Rico	Active	
	March 8, 1986	Interamerican University of Puerto Rico, Metropolitan Campus	Cupey, San Juan, Puerto Rico	Active	
		Iowa State University	Ames, Iowa	Active	
		Jackson State University	Jackson, Mississippi	Active	
		Jacksonville University	Jacksonville, Florida	Active	
		James Madison University	Harrisonburg, Virginia	Active	
	February 25, 1994	John Carroll University	University Heights, Ohio	Active	
		Kennesaw State University	Cobb County, Georgia	Active	
	April 28, 1982	Kent State University	Kent, Ohio	Active	
	November 3, 1994	La Salle University	Philadelphia, Pennsylvania	Active	
		Lamar University	Beaumont, Texas	Active	
		Lehigh University	Bethlehem, Pennsylvania	Active	
		Lewis & Clark College	Portland, Oregon	Active	
	May 16, 1985	Lipscomb University	Nashville, Tennessee	Active	
		Louisiana State University	Baton Rouge, Louisiana	Active	
		Louisiana Tech University	Ruston, Louisiana	Active	
		Loyola Marymount University	Los Angeles, California	Active	
	March 21, 1996	Loyola University Chicago	Chicago, Illinois	Active	
	January 8, 1988	Loyola University New Orleans	New Orleans, Louisiana	Active	
	November 22, 1985	Marquette University	Milwaukee, Wisconsin	Active	
	December 11, 1982	Marshall University	Huntington, West Virginia	Active	
	November 9, 1991	McDaniel College	Westminster, Maryland	Active	(Note: Chapter formed at Western Maryland College, now called McDaniel College.)
	April 12, 1985	Mercer University	Macon, Georgia	Active	
	May 5, 2002	Methodist University	Fayetteville, North Carolina	Active	
	May 2, 2001	Miami University	Oxford, Ohio	Active	
	May 18, 1990	Michigan State University	East Lansing, Michigan	Active	
		Middle Tennessee State University	Murfreesboro, Tennessee	Active	
		Mills College	Oakland, California	Inactive	
		Millsaps College	Jackson, Mississippi	Active	
	April 26, 1984	Mississippi College	Clinton, Mississippi	Active	
	April 24, 1981	Missouri State University	Springfield, Missouri	Active	(Note: Chapter formed at Southwest Missouri State University, now Missouri State University.)
	April 19, 1990	Monmouth University	West Long Branch, New Jersey	Active	
	February 25, 1987	Montclair State University	Montclair, New Jersey	Active	
		Moravian University	Bethlehem, Pennsylvania	Active	
	October 19, 1982	Morehead State University	Morehead, Kentucky	Active	
		Morehouse College	Atlanta, Georgia	Active	
	August 8, 1995	Mount Saint Mary's University, Los Angeles	Los Angeles, California	Active	
		National University	Virtual	Active	
		New York University	New York City, New York	Active	
	January 30, 1984	Niagara University	Lewiston, New York	Active	
		Norfolk State University	Norfolk, Virginia	Active	
		North Carolina A&T State University	Greensboro, North Carolina	Active	
		North Carolina Central University	Durham, North Carolina	Active	
		North Central College	Naperville, Illinois	Active	
	April 6, 1999	Northeastern State University	Tahlequah, Oklahoma	Active	
**Frank Palmer Speare**		Northeastern University	Boston, Massachusetts	Active	
	March 2, 1983	Northern Arizona University	Flagstaff, Arizona	Active	
	April 5, 1984	Northern Illinois University	DeKalb, Illinois	Active	
		Northern Kentucky University	Highland Heights, Kentucky	Active	
		Northwestern State University	Natchitoches, Louisiana	Active	
	May 28, 1998	Northwestern University	Evanston, Illinois	Active	
		Notre Dame de Namur University	Belmont, California	Active	
	April 30, 1986	Nova Southeastern University	Davie, Florida	Active	
		Oakland University	Rochester Hills, Michigan	Active	
		Oakwood University	Huntsville, Alabama	Active	
		Occidental College	Los Angeles, California	Active	
		Ohio Northern University	Ada, Ohio	Active	
	February 20, 1983	Ohio State University	Columbus, Ohio	Active	
	May 4, 1982	Ohio University	Athens, Ohio	Active	
	April 16, 1999	Oklahoma Baptist University	Shawnee, Oklahoma	Active	
	May 2, 1985	Oklahoma City University	Oklahoma City, Oklahoma	Active	
	February 15, 1985	Oklahoma State University	Stillwater, Oklahoma	Active	
	October 28, 1992	Oral Roberts University	Tulsa, Oklahoma	Active	
	November 9, 1994	Pacific Lutheran University	Parkland, Washington	Active	
	March 12, 1993	Pasadena City College	Pasadena, California	Active	
		Pennsylvania State University	University Park, Pennsylvania	Active	
	April 3, 1986	Pepperdine University	Malibu, California	Active	
		Thomas Jefferson University	Philadelphia, Pennsylvania	Active	(Note: Chapter formed at the Philadelphia, now called the Thomas Jefferson University.)
	October 21, 1983	Pontifical Catholic University of Puerto Rico	Ponce, Puerto Rico	Active	
		Providence College	Providence, Rhode Island	Active	
	October 24, 1984	Radford University	Radford, Virginia	Active	
	April 26, 1990	Ramapo College	Mahwah, New Jersey	Active	
		Regent University	Virginia Beach, Virginia	Active	
	September 29, 2001	Regis University	Denver, Colorado	Active	
		Rhodes College	Memphis, Tennessee	Active	
		Rochester Institute of Technology	Rochester, New York	Active	
		Rockhurst University	Kansas City, Missouri	Active	
		Roger Williams University	Bristol, Rhode Island	Active	
	October 23, 1993	Rollins College	Winter Park, Florida	Active	
		Rose–Hulman Institute of Technology	Terre Haute, Indiana	Active	
		Rutgers University–New Brunswick	New Brunswick, New Jersey	Active	
	April 19, 1985	Saint Louis University	St. Louis, Missouri	Active	
	March 21, 1993	Salisbury University	Salisbury, Maryland	Active	
**Robert A. Gammage**	October 12, 1994	Sam Houston State University	Huntsville, Texas	Active	
		San Diego State University	San Diego, California	Active	
		San Jose State University	San Jose, California	Active	
	May 31, 1997	Savannah State University	Savannah, Georgia	Active	
	May 23, 1995	Seattle University	Seattle, Washington	Active	
	February 20, 1986	Seton Hall University	South Orange, New Jersey	Active	
		Siena University	Loudonville, New York	Active	
	April 5, 2002	South Carolina State University	Orangeburg, South Carolina	Active	
	April 29, 1987	Southern Arkansas University	Magnolia, Arkansas	Active	
	November 1, 1990	Southern Illinois University Edwardsville	Edwardsville, Illinois	Active	
		Southern Illinois University Carbondale	Carbondale, Illinois	Active	
	February 26, 1991	Southern Methodist University	Dallas, Texas	Active	
	October 20, 1983	Southwest Baptist University	Bolivar, Missouri	Active	
		Spelman College	Atlanta, Georgia	Active	
		St. Ambrose University	Davenport, Iowa	Active	
	September 21, 1990	St. Edward's University	Austin, Texas	Active	
	April 27, 2001	St. John Fisher University	Pittsford, New York	Active	
		St. John's University	New York City, New York	Active	
		St. Joseph's University	Brooklyn, New York	Active	
	December 5, 1999	St. Mary's University, Texas	San Antonio, Texas	Active	
	April 2, 1997	State University of New York at Geneseo	Geneseo, New York	Active	
		Stephen F. Austin State University	Nacogdoches, Texas	Active	
	April 20, 1995	Stephens College	Columbia, Missouri	Active	
	October 8, 1985	Stetson University	DeLand, Florida	Active	
	May 26, 1987	Stony Brook University	Stony Brook, New York	Active	
	April 20, 1995	Sweet Briar College	Amherst County, Virginia	Active	
	January 19, 1992	Syracuse University	Syracuse, New York	Active	
	December 4, 2000	Tarleton State University	Stephenville, Texas	Active	
	July 20, 1996	Temple University	Philadelphia, Pennsylvania	Active	
		Tennessee State University	Nashville, Tennessee	Active	
		Texas A&M International University	Laredo, Texas	Active	
	April 23, 1991	Texas A&M University	Commerce, Texas	Active	
		Texas A&M University–Corpus Christi	Corpus Christi, Texas	Active	
	May 2, 1987	Texas State University	San Marcos, Texas	Active	(Note: Chapter formed at Southwest Texas State University, now Texas State University.)
	March 11, 1992	Texas Tech University	Lubbock, Texas	Active	
	December 5, 1989	Texas Wesleyan University	Fort Worth, Texas	Active	
	March 22, 1989	Texas Woman's University	Denton, Texas	Active	
	November 19, 1989	Thomas More University	Crestview Hills, Kentucky	Active	
		Tougaloo College	Jackson, Mississippi	Active	
		Towson University	Towson, Maryland	Active	
		Transylvania University	Lexington, Kentucky	Active	
	November 9, 1991	Trinity University	San Antonio, Texas	Active	
		Troy University	Troy, Alabama	Active	
		Tulane University	New Orleans, Louisiana	Active	
		Union College	Schenectady, New York	Active	
	May 2, 1991	University at Albany, SUNY	Albany, New York	Active	
		University at Buffalo	Buffalo, New York	Active	
	November 2, 1985	University of Akron	Akron, Ohio	Active	
	November 16, 1983	University of Alabama	Tuscaloosa, Alabama	Active	
	February 1, 1986	University of Arizona	Tucson, Arizona	Active	
	April 17, 1985	University of Arkansas	Fayetteville, Arkansas	Active	
	April 29, 1985	University of Arkansas at Monticello	Monticello, Arkansas	Active	
		University of Baltimore	Baltimore, Maryland	Active	
	March 1, 2002	University of California, Berkeley	Berkeley, California	Active	
	October 22, 1988	University of California, Davis	Davis, California	Active	
	November 22, 1985	University of California, Irvine	Irvine, California	Active	
		University of California, Los Angeles	Los Angeles, California	Active	
	April 2013	University of California, Merced	Merced, California	Active	
		University of California, Riverside	Riverside, California	Active	
	June 7, 1991	University of California, San Diego	San Diego, California	Active	
		University of California, Santa Barbara	Santa Barbara, California	Active	
		University of California, Santa Cruz	Santa Cruz, California	Active	
	December 4, 1986	University of Central Arkansas	Conway, Arkansas	Active	
	October 1, 1992	University of Central Florida	Orlando, Florida	Active	
	March 9, 1984	University of Cincinnati	Cincinnati, Ohio	Active	
	March 12, 1988	University of Colorado Colorado Springs	Colorado Springs, Colorado	Active	
	September 18, 1993	University of Colorado Boulder	Boulder, Colorado	Active	
	April 20, 1985	University of Dayton	Dayton, Ohio	Active	
		University of Delaware	Newark, Delaware	Active	
	November 22, 1985	University of Detroit Mercy	Detroit, Michigan	Active	
	March 14, 1984	University of Evansville	Evansville, Indiana	Active	
	April 14, 1986	University of Florida	Gainesville, Florida	Active	
	June 3, 1984	University of Georgia	Athens, Georgia	Active	
	April 10, 1997	University of Houston	Houston, Texas	Active	
	November 2, 1997	University of Houston–Clear Lake	Houston, Texas	Active	
	April 5, 1994	University of Illinois Urbana-Champaign	Urbana, Illinois	Active	
	May 12, 1984	University of Illinois Chicago	Chicago, Illinois	Active	
		University of Illinois Springfield	Springfield, Illinois	Active	
	November 23, 1997	University of Iowa	Iowa City, Iowa	Active	
	September 25, 1994	University of Kansas	Lawrence, Kansas	Active	
	December 5, 1999	University of Kentucky	Lexington, Kentucky	Active	
	September 23, 1982	University of Louisville	Louisville, Kentucky	Active	
	March 5, 1999	University of Maryland, College Park	College Park, Maryland	Active	
		University of Maryland Eastern Shore	Princess Anne, Maryland	Active	
	April 14, 1997	University of Memphis	Memphis, Tennessee	Active	
	October 24, 1996	University of Miami	Coral Gables, Florida	Active	
	February 17, 1989	University of Michigan	Ann Arbor, Michigan	Inactive	
	April 4, 1990	University of Michigan–Dearborn	Dearborn, Michigan	Active	
		University of Mississippi	Oxford, Mississippi	Active	
	February 16, 1984	University of Missouri	Columbia, Missouri	Active	
	March 20, 1997	University of Missouri–Kansas City	Kansas City, Missouri	Active	
	January 11, 2001	University of Missouri–St. Louis	St. Louis, Missouri	Active	
		University of Mount Union	Alliance, Ohio	Inactive	
	May 4, 1997	University of Nebraska–Lincoln	Lincoln, Nebraska	Active	
		University of Nebraska Omaha	Omaha, Nebraska	Active	
	October 24, 1985	University of Nevada, Las Vegas	Paradise, Nevada	Active	
	April 23, 1998	University of Nevada, Reno	Reno, Nevada	Active	
	May 14, 2001	University of New Mexico	Albuquerque, New Mexico	Active	
	November 22, 1998	University of New Orleans	New Orleans, Louisiana	Active	
	April 11, 1985	University of North Carolina at Asheville	Asheville, North Carolina	Active	
	October 10, 1994	University of North Carolina at Chapel Hill	Chapel Hill, North Carolina	Active	
		University of North Carolina Wilmington	Wilmington, North Carolina	Active	
		University of North Florida	Jacksonville, Florida	Active	
	March 8, 1989	University of North Texas	Denton, Texas	Active	
	April 26, 1984	University of Oklahoma	Norman, Oklahoma	Active	
	February 28, 1993	University of Pennsylvania	Philadelphia, Pennsylvania	Active	
		University of Pikeville	Pikeville, Kentucky	Active	
		University of Pittsburgh	Pittsburgh, Pennsylvania	Active	
		University of Portland	Portland, Oregon	Active	
	February 23, 1989	University of Puerto Rico at Mayagüez	Mayagüez, Puerto Rico	Active	
	May 7, 1992	University of Puget Sound	Tacoma, Washington	Active	
		University of Rhode Island	Kingston, Rhode Island	Active	
	April 29, 1983	University of Richmond	Richmond, Virginia	Active	
	April 25, 1982	University of San Diego	San Diego, California	Active	
		University of San Francisco	San Francisco, California	Active	
	April 28, 1984	University of South Alabama	Mobile, Alabama	Active	
	December 6, 1991	University of South Carolina	Columbia, South Carolina	Active	
	April 18, 1985	University of South Dakota	Vermillion, South Dakota	Active	
	19xx ?–19xx ?; Fall 2020	University of South Florida	Tampa, Florida	Active	
	April 24, 1983	University of Southern California	Los Angeles, California	Active	
		University of Tampa	Tampa, Florida	Active	
	October 7, 1992	University of Tennessee	Knoxville, Tennessee	Active	
	May 21, 1984	University of Tennessee at Martin	Martin, Tennessee	Active	
	December 4, 2000	University of Texas at Arlington	Arlington, Texas	Active	
	January 31, 1987	University of Texas at Austin	Austin, Texas	Active	
	April 20, 1989	University of Texas at Dallas	Richardson, Texas	Active	
		University of Texas at El Paso	El Paso, Texas	Active	
	April 23, 1991	University of Texas at San Antonio	San Antonio, Texas	Active	
	December 5, 1999	University of the Incarnate Word	San Antonio, Texas	Active	
	December 8, 1992	University of the Pacific	Stockton, California	Active	
	March 11, 1992	University of Toledo	Toledo, Ohio	Active	
	January 14, 1987	University of Tulsa	Tulsa, Oklahoma	Active	
	November 16, 1995	University of Utah	Salt Lake City, Utah	Active	
	February 24, 1991	University of Virginia	Charlottesville, Virginia	Active	
	April 9, 1985	University of Washington	Seattle, Washington	Active	
	August 2, 1998	University of West Florida	Pensacola, Florida	Active	
		University of Wisconsin–Madison	Madison, Wisconsin	Active	
	May 11, 1984	University of Wisconsin–Oshkosh	Oshkosh, Wisconsin	Active	
	April 2, 1996	University of Wyoming	Laramie, Wyoming	Active	
	November 8, 1991	Valdosta State University	Valdosta, Georgia	Active	
	December 9, 1992	Vanderbilt University	Nashville, Tennessee	Active	
		Vanguard University	Costa Mesa, California	Active	
		Virginia State University	Ettrick, Virginia	Active	
	October 9, 1986	Virginia Tech	Blacksburg, Virginia	Active	
	2019	Wake Forest University	Winston-Salem, North Carolina	Active	
	November 23, 1981	Walsh College	Troy, Michigan	Active	
	September 12, 1986	Washington University in St. Louis	St. Louis, Missouri	Active	
	March 25, 1994	Wayne State University	Detroit, Michigan	Active	
	May 18, 1985	Weber State University	Ogden, Utah	Active	
		West Chester University	West Chester, Pennsylvania	Active	
	May 1, 1985	West Texas A&M University	Canyon, Texas	Active	
	April 18, 1984	Western Carolina University	Cullowhee, North Carolina	Active	
		Western Illinois University	Macomb, Illinois	Active	
		Western Kentucky University	Bowling Green, Kentucky	Active	
		Western Oregon University	Monmouth, Oregon	Active	
	February 3, 2000	Westminster College	Fulton, Missouri	Active	
	April 10, 1986	Willamette University	Salem, Oregon	Active	
	April 4, 1997	William Jewell College	Liberty, Missouri	Active	
	May 2017	William Peace University	Raleigh, North Carolina	Active	
	November 10, 1998	William Woods University	Fulton, Missouri	Active	
		Wingate University	Wingate, North Carolina	Inactive	
		Winthrop University	Rock Hill, South Carolina	Active	
	February 15, 1989	Wofford College	Spartanburg, South Carolina	Active	
	June 8, 1990	Wright State University	Fairborn, Ohio	Active	
		Xavier University	Cincinnati, Ohio	Active	
	May 1, 1986	Xavier University of Louisiana	New Orleans, Louisiana	Active	
	May 20, 1988	Youngstown State University	Youngstown, Ohio	Active	

== Alumni chapters ==
Following are the alumni chapters of Phi Alpha Delta, with active chapters indicated in bold and inactive chapters in italics.

Chapter	Charter date and range	Location	Status	Ref.
Chicago	February 2, 1911	Chicago, Illinois	Active	
Portland	February 6, 1911	Portland, Oregon	Active	
Hon. Justice Ruth Bader Ginsburg NYC	March 28, 1911	New York City, New York	Active	
Robert E. Redding	June 5, 1911	Washington, D.C.	Active	
Kansas City	April 1, 1912	Kansas City, Missouri	Active	
Sandy Rae L.A.	June 20, 1912	Los Angeles, California	Active	
Cincinnati	September 12, 1912	Cincinnati, Ohio	Active	
Grand Forks	April 19, 1913	Grand Forks, North Dakota	Active	
Cleveland	April 19, 1913	Cleveland, Ohio	Active	
San Francisco	May 25, 1914	San Francisco, California	Active	
Indianapolis	May 9, 1919	Indianapolis, Indiana	Active	
Seattle	December 4, 1919	Seattle, Washington	Active	
Bloomington	December 19, 1919	Bloomington, Indiana	Active	
St. Louis	February 14, 1921	St. Louis, Missouri	Active	
Hotchkiss	February 4, 1922	Topeka, Kansas	Active	
Detroit	March 31, 1923	Detroit, Michigan	Active	
Buffalo	September 2, 1927	Buffalo, New York	Active	
Virginia State	September 2, 1927	Virginia	Active	
Pittsburgh	March 18, 1931	Pittsburgh, Pennsylvania	Active	
Twin City	March 1, 1932	Minneapolis and Saint Paul, Minnesota	Active	
Dallas	May 28, 1932	Dallas, Texas	Active	
Jacksonville	April 3, 1935	Jacksonville, Florida	Active	
East Bay	February 6, 1936	Oakland, California	Active	
Charleston	February 22, 1936	Charleston, West Virginia	Active	
Daytona Beach	February 22, 1937	Daytona Beach, Florida	Active	
Shenandoah Valley	March 19, 1937	Shenandoah Valley, Virginia	Active	
Miami	July 1, 1938	Miami, Florida	Active	
Wichita	October 10, 1947	Wichita, Kansas	Active	
Tall Corn	October 22, 1949	Des Moines, Iowa	Active	
Rocky Mountain	April 11, 1950	Denver, Colorado	Active	
Atlanta	June 3, 1950	Atlanta, Georgia	Active	
Milwaukee	September 1, 1950	Milwaukee, Wisconsin	Active	
Louisville	March 1, 1951	Louisville, Kentucky	Active	
Omaha	August 23, 1952	Omaha, Nebraska	Active	
Knoxville	September 21, 1953	Knoxville, Tennessee	Active	
Arkansas	October 3, 1953	Little Rock, Arkansas	Active	
Magaw	December 9, 1953	Philadelphia, Pennsylvania	Active	
Alabama	April 30, 1954	Alabama	Active	
Santa Barbara-Ventura	April 7, 1956	Santa Barbara, California	Active	
Salt Lake City	June 5, 1956	Salt Lake City, Utah	Active	
Syracuse	March 15, 1957	Syracuse, New York	Active	
Barton	May 1, 1958	St. Petersburg, Florida	Active	
Baltimore	May 29, 1958	Baltimore, Maryland	Active	
San Diego	August 21, 1958	San Diego, California	Active	
Piedmont	November 15, 1958	Winston-Salem, North Carolina	Active	
Hawkeye	December 13, 1958	Iowa City, Iowa	Active	
Houston	October 21, 1959	Houston, Texas	Active	
Tallahassee	March 26, 1960	Tallahassee, Florida	Active	
Toledo	April 8, 1961	Toledo, Ohio	Active	
Orange Coast	July 13, 1961	Santa Ana, California	Active	
Chattanooga	November 22, 1961	Chattanooga, Tennessee	Active	
Palmetto	May 4, 1962	Columbia, South Carolina	Active	
Valley of the Sun	December 13, 1962	Phoenix, Arizona	Active	
Akron	November 12, 1963	Akron, Ohio	Active	
Central Ohio	November 21, 1964	Columbus, Ohio	Active	
Boston	May 8, 1965	Boston, Massachusetts	Active	
New Orleans	June 25, 1965	New Orleans, Louisiana	Active	
Memphis	May 28, 1966	Memphis, Tennessee	Active	
Gainesville	October 30, 1966	Gainesville, Florida	Active	
Tulsa	March 18, 1967	Tulsa, Oklahoma	Active	
Lubbock	September 6, 1969	Lubbock, Texas	Active	
Birmingham	April 25, 1970	Birmingham, Alabama	Active	
Tri-State	February 8, 1971	Kentucky, Ohio, and West Virginia	Active	
Nashville	November 4, 1971	Nashville, Tennessee	Active	
New Jersey	April 7, 1972	New Jersey	Active	
Toronto	January 26, 1973	Toronto, Ontario, Canada	Active	
Vancouver	February 10, 1973	Vancouver, British Columbia, Canada	Active	
San Antonio	April 26, 1973	San Antonio, Texas	Active	
Lincoln	June 27, 1974	Lincoln, Nebraska	Active	
Aloha	July 28, 1975	Honolulu, Hawaii	Active	
Puerto Rico	October 4, 1975	Puerto Rico	Active	
Austin	December 16, 1976	Austin, Texas	Active	
Nevada	May 20, 1977	Las Vegas, Nevada	Active	
Miami Valley	September 28, 1977	Dayton, Ohio	Active	
Madison	March 28, 1980	Madison, Wisconsin	Active	
Tisdale	June 11, 1980	Bismarck, North Dakota	Active	
Northern Illinois	February 19, 1982	Barrington, Illinois	Active	
South Dade	May 19, 1982	Homestead, Florida	Active	
Sacramento	June 8, 1982	Sacramento, California	Active	
San Juan	July 1, 1982	San Juan, Puerto Rico	Active	
Ft. Lauderdale-Broward Co.	September 9, 1983	Ft. Lauderdale and Broward County, Florida	Active	
Greater Albuquerque	October 27, 1983	Albuquerque, New Mexico	Active	
Long Island	January 6, 1984	Long Island, New York	Active	
Old Pueblo	February 22, 1984	Tucson, Arizona	Active	
South Bay	March 22, 1985	San Jose, California	Active	
Brooklyn-Queens	February 26, 1986	Brooklyn and Queens, New York	Active	
Springfield	June 26, 1988	Springfield, Massachusetts	Active	
Southwest Missouri	November 17, 1988	Springfield, Missouri	Active	
San Fernando Valley	December 8, 1988	Los Angeles, California	Active	
New Hampshire Statewide	March 16, 1989	New Hampshire	Active	
Palm Beach	May 15, 1992	Palm Beach, Florida	Active	
Aleman	November 4, 1992	Monterrey, Mexico	Active	
Hudson Valley	August 6, 1994	Rockland, County and Westchester County, New York	Active	
Central Connecticut	December 19, 1999	Hartford, Connecticut	Active	
Niagara Frontier	November 8, 2001	Lockport, New York	Active	
West Suburban	August 17, 2006	Burr Ridge, Illinois	Active	
New Mexico Statewide	December 14, 2009	New Mexico	Active	
Las Vegas	March 17, 2010	Las Vegas, Nevada	Active	
Illinois Statewide	November 20, 2013	Illinois	Active	
Minnesota Statewide	January 3, 2014	Minnesota	Active	
Triangle Area	January 11, 2014	Raleigh, Durham, and Chapel Hill, North Carolina	Active	
Charlotte	April 1, 2014	Charlotte, North Carolina	Active	
Arizona Statewide	June 23, 2016	Arizona	Active	
Brooklyn	October 20, 2016	Brooklyn, New York	Active	
Orlando	November 2, 2017	Orlando, Florida	Active	
Kentucky Statewide	March 12, 2018	Lexington, Kentucky	Active	
Low Country	September 17, 2018	Charleston, South Carolina	Active	
South Sound	January 25, 2019	Olympia, Washington	Active	
Capital Region	February 28, 2019	Albany, New York	Active	
Alaska Statewide	January 17, 2020	Alaska	Active	
Tidewater	October 8, 2021	Virginia Beach, Virginia	Active	
Central Alabama		Montgomery, Alabama	Active	
Central Oklahoma		Oklahoma City, Oklahoma	Active	
