= Post Oak (disambiguation) =

Post Oak (Quercus stellata) is a North American species of oak in the white oak section.

Post Oak may also refer to:

- Post Oak, Missouri, an unincorporated community in Johnson County
- Post Oak, Virginia, an unincorporated community in Spotsylvania County
- Post Oak Mall, a shopping mall in College Station, Texas
- Post Oak Tree or Tree That Owns Itself, a tree in Alabama
- The Post Oak, a mixed-use skyscraper in Houston, Texas
