= Willis A. Hawkins =

American judge (died 1886)

Willis Alston Hawkins (died November 28, 1886) was a justice of the Supreme Court of Georgia in 1880.

Hawkins was born in Madison County, Georgia.

On September 10, 1880, Governor Alfred H. Colquitt "made the temporary appointment of Col. Willis A. Hawkins, of Sumter County, as Associate Justice of the Supreme Court of Georgia for the two months between this and the assembling of the Legislature in November".

Political offices
Preceded by James Jackson	Justice of the Supreme Court of Georgia; 1880–1880	Succeeded by Alexander M. Speer
