= Judge Speer =

Judge Speer may refer to:

- Alexander M. Speer, justice of the Supreme Court of Georgia
- Emory Speer (1848–1918), judge of the United States District Court for the Southern District of Georgia
- Jack Speer (1920–2008), judge of the Bernalillo County, New Mexico, Small Claims Court

== See also ==
- Albert Spear (1852–1929), judge and politician in Maine
