= Justice Fish =

Justice Fish may refer to:

- Frank L. Fish (1863–1927), associate justice of the Vermont Supreme Court
- Morris Fish (1938–present), former puisne justice of the Supreme Court of Canada
- William H. Fish (1849–1926), associate justice and chief justice of the Supreme Court of Georgia
