= Tree That Owns Itself =

Tree in Georgia, USA

The Tree That Owns Itself
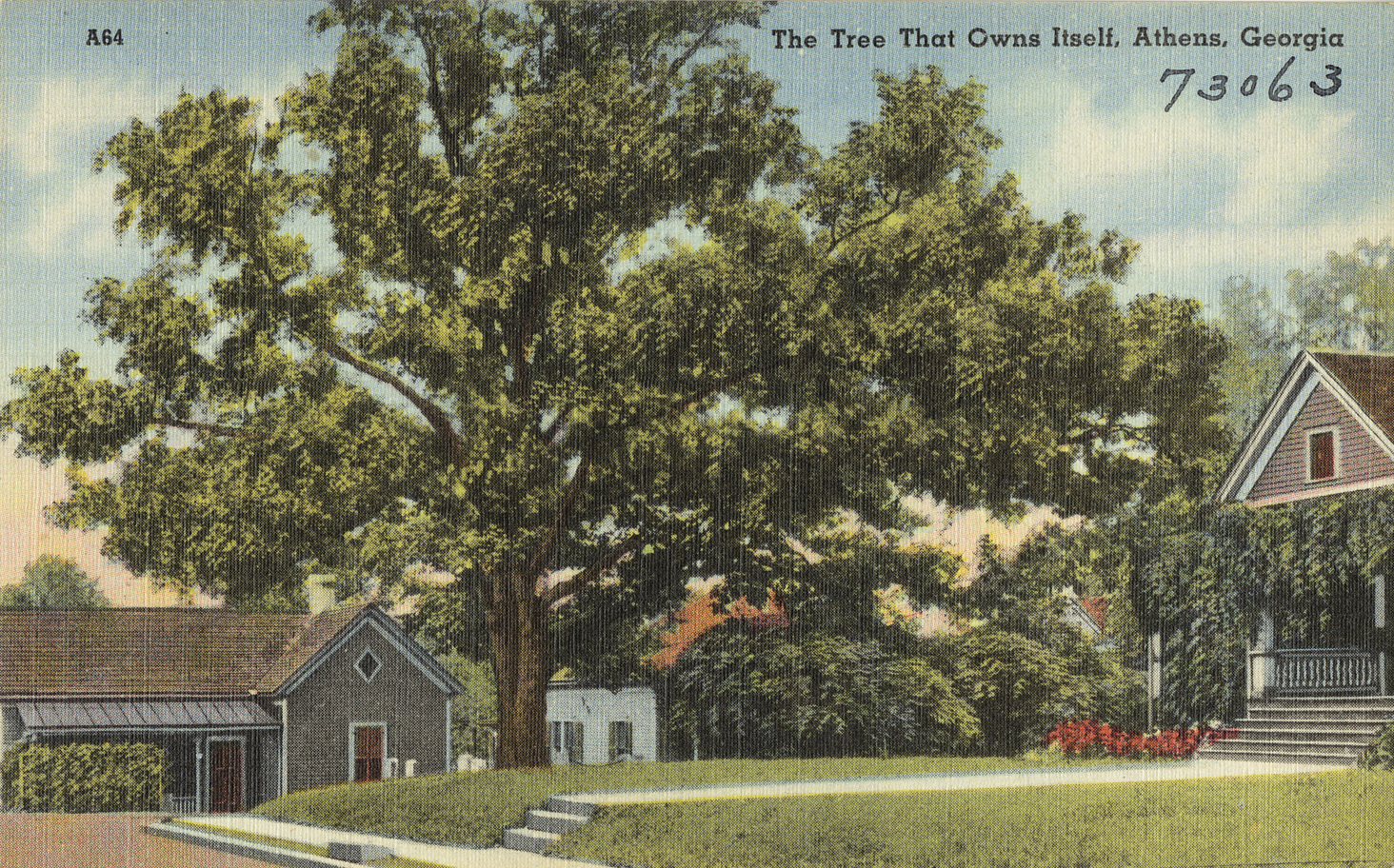
- Postcard of the tree from the 1930s or 1940s

- Location within Georgia
- Species: White oak (Quercus alba)
- Coordinates: 33.954779°N 83.382325°W
- Date seeded: mid 1500s - late 1700s (replaced in 1942)
- Date felled: 1942 (replaced – grown from one of its acorns)
- Custodian: Itself & Athens, Georgia

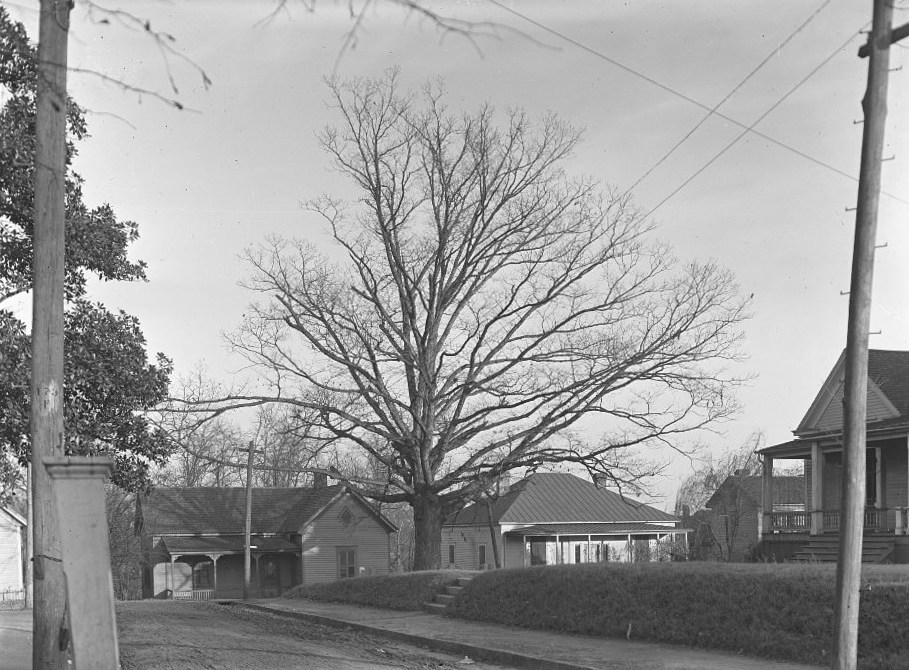
The original Tree That Owns Itself in 1910

The Tree That Owns Itself is a white oak tree that, according to legend, has legal ownership of itself and of all land within eight feet (2.4 m) of its base. Also known as the Jackson Oak, the tree is at the corner of South Finley and Dearing Streets in Athens, Georgia, US. The original tree, thought to have started life between the mid-16th and late 18th century, fell in 1942, but a new tree was grown from one of its acorns and planted in the same location. The current tree is sometimes referred to as the Son of the Tree That Owns Itself. Both trees have appeared in numerous national publications, and the site is a local landmark.

== Legend ==
The earliest-known telling of the tree's story comes from "Deeded to Itself", a front-page article in the Athens Weekly Banner on August 12, 1890. The article explains that the tree had been located on the property of Colonel William Henry Jackson. William Jackson was the son of James Jackson, a soldier in the American Revolution as well as a Congressman, US Senator, and Governor of Georgia, and the father of another James Jackson, a Congressman and Chief Justice of the Supreme Court of Georgia. He was the brother of Jabez Young Jackson, also a Congressman.

William Jackson was reportedly a professor at the University of Georgia and is sometimes mentioned with the title of Doctor. The nature of his military service and the source of the title Colonel are unknown. Jackson supposedly cherished childhood memories of the tree, and, desiring to protect it, deeded to it the ownership of itself and its surrounding land. By various accounts, this transaction took place between 1820 and 1832. (Note: The date "1832" is given on a brass plaque affixed to the tree's retaining wall.) According to the newspaper article, the deed read:

I, W. H. Jackson, of the county of Clarke, of the one part, and the oak tree ... of the county of Clarke, of the other part: Witnesseth, That the said W. H. Jackson for and in consideration of the great affection which he bears said tree, and his great desire to see it protected has conveyed, and by these presents do convey unto the said oak tree entire possession of itself and of all land within eight feet [2.4 m] of it on all sides.

It is unclear whether the story of the Tree That Owns Itself began with the Weekly Banner article, or if it had been an element of local folklore prior to that time. The article's author writes that, in 1890, there were few people still living who knew the story.

The story of the Tree That Owns Itself is widely known and is almost always presented as fact. Only one person—the anonymous author of "Deeded to Itself"—has ever claimed to have seen Jackson's deed to the tree. Most writers acknowledge that the deed is lost or no longer exists—if in fact it ever did exist. Such a deed would have no legal effect. Under common law, the recipient of a piece of property must have the legal capacity to receive it, and the property must be delivered to—and accepted by—the recipient. Both are impossible for a tree to do, as it isn't a legal person.

William H. Jackson owned the property on the opposite side of Dearing Street from the tree. That plot included the present-day 226 Dearing Street. In the early 19th century it was simply designated Lot #14. The tree is located on a portion of what had been Lot #15. Jackson and his wife Mildred, along with a J. A. Cobb, sold their property to a Dr. Malthus Ward in 1832, the same year cited on a plaque as being the date of the tree's deed. The Clarke County real estate indices contain no indication of when or from whom Jackson originally purchased the property, although much of the land in that area is reported to have belonged to a Major James Meriwether.

Athens-Clarke County confirms that the tree is in the right-of-way, and is "accepted for care" by municipal authorities. According to city-county officials, local government and the owners of the adjacent property jointly serve as "stewards" for the care of the tree. Athens' Junior Ladies' Garden Club serves as its "primary advocate". Regarding Jackson's deed, one writer noted at the beginning of the 20th century, "However defective this title may be in law, the public recognized it." In that spirit, it is the stated position of the Athens-Clarke County Unified Government that the tree, in spite of the law, does indeed own itself. It is the policy of the city of Athens to maintain it as a public street tree.

== History ==
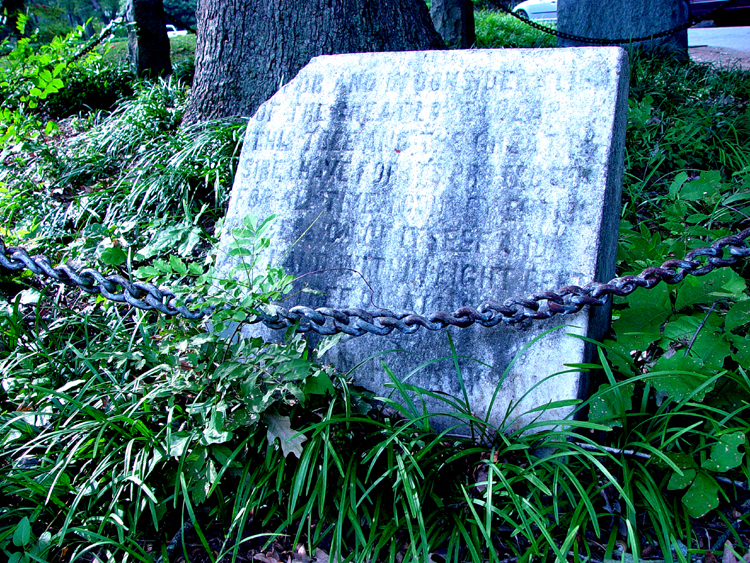
Plaque at the site, weathered by exposure. The stone faintly details a passage from William H. Jackson's deed to the tree.

The original Tree That Owns Itself is estimated to have started life at some time between the mid-16th and late 18th centuries. The tree was considered by some to be both the biggest tree in Athens and the most famous tree in the United States. The tree predated the transformation of the area into a residential neighborhood beginning in the mid-19th century. The residence adjacent to the tree, known as Dominie House, was built at the corner of Milledge Avenue and Waddell Street in 1883, and was moved to its present location about twenty years later.

By 1906, erosion had become apparent at the base of the tree. George Foster Peabody paid to have new soil, a commemorative tablet, and a chain barricade supported by eight granite posts installed around the tree. Despite these efforts, the tree reportedly suffered heavy damage during an ice storm in 1907. Although attempts were made at preservation, rot had already set in, and the tree was permanently weakened.

The original oak fell on the evening of October 9, 1942, following a long period of decline. Its poor condition had been known for years, and within days of its collapse, a move was underway to replace the fallen tree with a "son" grown from one of its acorns. One account suggests that the tree had actually died several years before its collapse, the victim of root rot. The tree was over 100 feet (30 m) tall, and was estimated to be between 150 and 400 years old when it fell. It has been reported elsewhere that the tree fell on December 1, 1942, succumbing not to old age and disease but rather to a violent windstorm that ravaged much of north Georgia that evening, causing widespread damage and killing several people.

While it is possible that some portion of the tree had remained standing for several weeks, meeting a dramatic end at the hands of a killer storm, only the earlier date is supported by newspaper accounts. It is not known why the tree was not dated by counting its rings, unless the tree’s core was rotten out, fairly likely given its age and the way its death has often been described, thereby destroying many if not all of its rings before it ever fell.

== Son of The Tree That Owns Itself ==
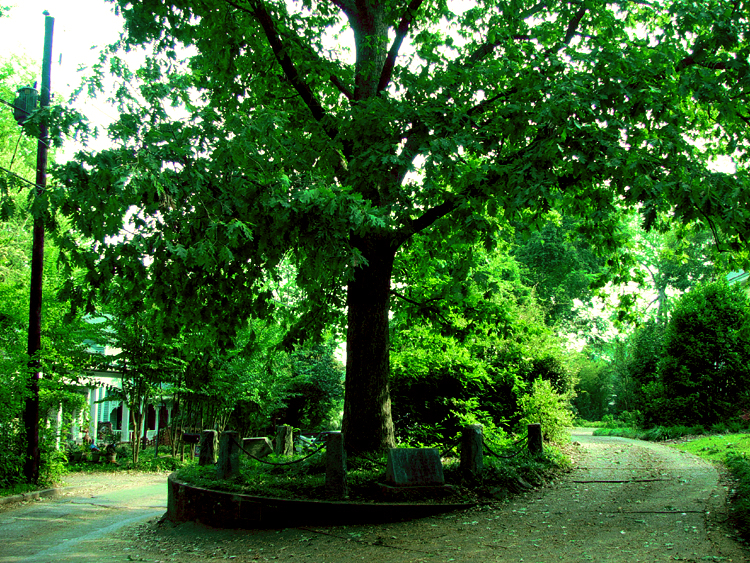
Son of The Tree That Owns Itself, 2005

After the original tree's demise, its small plot sat vacant for four years. Dan Magill, the young son of Athens' Junior Ladies Garden Club member Elizabeth Magill, suggested that his mother's club find a replacement for the tree. Several Athenians had cultivated seedlings from the acorns of the original tree. One growing in the yard of Capt. Jack Watson, at five feet (1.5 m) in height, was deemed the best candidate for transplantation. The operation was directed by Roy Bowden of the College of Agriculture at the University of Georgia, assisted by students in the Department of Horticulture.

The new tree was officially dedicated in a formal ceremony on December 4, 1946. Athens Mayor Robert L. McWhorter presided and Dr. E.L. Hill, the pastor of the First Presbyterian Church, offered a short prayer. Also in attendance were Capt. and Mrs. Watson and representatives of the Garden Club. Club President Patsy Dudley announced that her group would henceforth take responsibility for maintenance of the tree's plot, which had fallen into disrepair during the vacancy.

The new tree, trimmed back to 3 feet (0.91 m) for transplantation, thrived in its new location. This tree is considered, popularly if not legally, to be the full heir of the original tree. As such, it is sometimes referred to as the Son of The Tree That Owns Itself, although it is generally known by the same title as its progenitor. The tree was over 50 feet (15 m) tall as of 2006.

On December 4, 1996, the Garden Club staged a celebration to mark the fiftieth anniversary of the planting of the new tree. Dan Magill, who as a boy, had inspired the replanting effort, served as master of ceremonies.

The tree sits near the crest of a hill, at the southwest corner of the intersection of Dearing and Finley Streets, in a quiet residential neighborhood near downtown Athens and UGA's North Campus. The portion of Finley Street leading up the hill to the tree is Athens' only remaining cobblestone street. The tree's lot is separated from the larger portion of the adjacent property by a private driveway. Its enclosure juts several feet into Finley Street. Thus the tree may appear to occupy a small but separate tract of land. The appearance of separation is accentuated by the retaining wall and ornamental chain barrier that surround the tree. Although alongside private homes in a residential neighborhood, the Tree That Owns Itself is "open" to the public, and regularly attracts visitors.

Although the story of the Tree That Owns Itself is more legend than history, the tree has become, along with the University Arch and the Double-Barreled Cannon, one of the most recognized and well-loved symbols of Athens. It is routinely featured in travel guides and other visitor information and has even garnered international recognition through such publications as Ripley's Believe It or Not!, where it has been featured on several occasions.

== Tablets ==
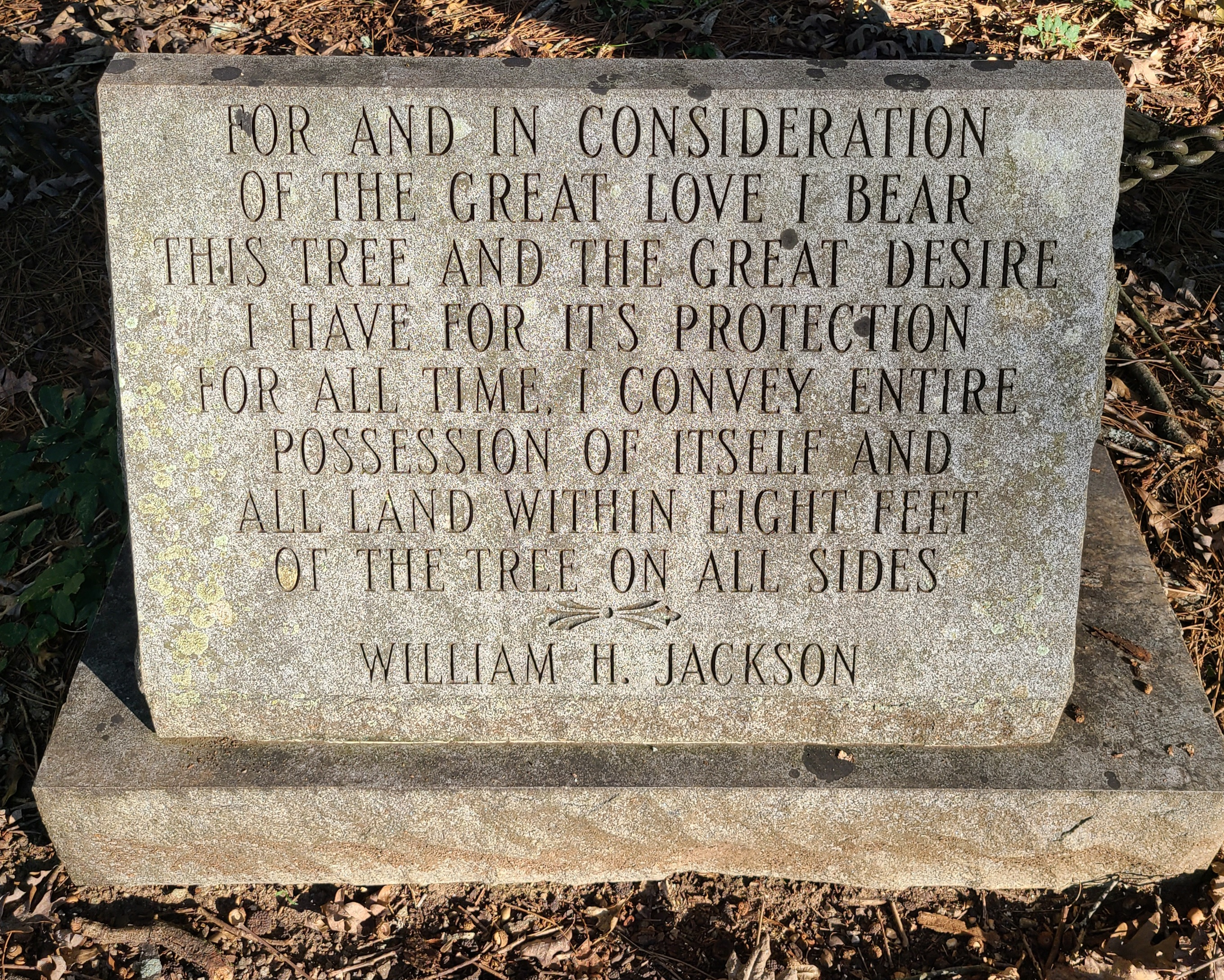
Plaque quoting William H. Jackson

The site of the tree contains two stone tablets. The first is heavily weathered and has suffered the loss of one corner, while the second appears to be considerably newer. Both tablets paraphrase the same portion of William H. Jackson's supposed deed to the tree, with slight alterations made to transform the legalistic language into a first-person declaration of affection:

For and in consideration of the great love I bear this tree and the great desire I have for its protection for all time, I convey entire possession of itself and all land within eight feet of the tree on all sides

— William H. Jackson

A small brass plaque, about the size of a playing card, is attached to the lower-left corner of the face of the more weathered of the two tablets. It reads:

A
Descendant of the
Tree
That Owns Itself
Planted by the
Junior
Ladies Garden Club
1946

In addition to the stone tablets, a larger brass plaque is affixed to the concrete retaining wall that surrounds the tree. The plaque reads:

The Tree That Owns Itself
Quercus alba
Deeded to itself by Col. William H. Jackson
circa 1832
This scion of the original tree was planted by
the Junior Ladies Garden Club in 1946

National Register of Historic Places 1975
Athens Historical Landmark 1988

The entire Dearing Street Historic District (of which the tree is a "resident") was added to the National Register in 1975. The District incorporates an area very roughly bounded by Broad, Finley, Waddell, and Church Streets, and was recognized for its architectural significance. The tree was locally designated a historic landmark on February 2, 1988.

== Similar trees ==
There is another tree with almost identical legal rights in Eufaula, Alabama, United States. In a similar story, this oak tree was bestowed legal ownership to itself on April 9, 1936, with the inscription "Only God can make a tree" (the closing statement of Joyce Kilmer's 1913 poem "Trees"). Similarly, the tree fell in a storm on April 9, 1961, and it was replaced with another tree in its place ten days later.

== See also ==
- Tree That Owns Itself (Alabama)
- List of individual trees
- Plant rights
