= Thomas J. Simmons =

American judge (1837–1905)

Thomas Jefferson Simmons
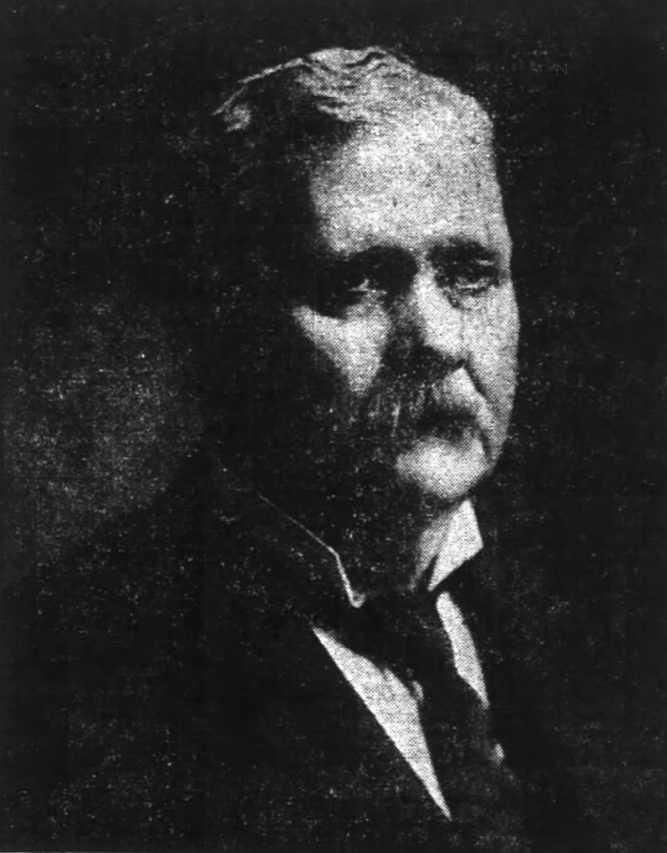
- Chief Justice Thomas J. Simmons

Justice of the Supreme Court of Georgia
- In office 1887–1894
- Preceded by: Samuel A. Hall
- Succeeded by: Spencer Roane Atkinson

Chief Justice of the Supreme Court of Georgia
- In office 1894–1905
- Preceded by: Logan Edwin Bleckley
- Succeeded by: William Hansell Fish

Personal details
- Born: June 25, 1837 Crawford County, near Knoxville, Georgia, United States
- Died: September 12, 1905 (aged 68)
- Military career
- Allegiance: Confederate States of America
- Branch: Confederate States Army
- Service years: 1861-1865
- Rank: Lieutenant Colonel
- Conflicts: American Civil War; Battle of Big Bethel

Thomas Jefferson Simmons (June 25, 1837 – September 12, 1905) was a justice of the Supreme Court of Georgia from 1887 to 1894, and chief justice from 1894 to 1905.

== Early life, education, and military service ==
Born in Crawford County, near Knoxville, Georgia, where he was raised on a farm, he began his formal education of his own accord at age 18. He read law and opened an office in Knoxville, which quickly became a large and lucrative practice. At the outset of the American Civil War, he enlisted in the Confederate States Army in Crawford's Grays, the first company to leave the county in 1861. His company with assigned to the Sixth Georgia regiment, commanded by Alfred H. Colquitt. Entering service as a private, he was soon promoted to Lieutenant. On the organization of the 45th regiment in March 1862, he was elected Lieutenant Colonel, under colonel Thomas Hardeman. When Hardeman resigned, Simmons was made Colonel. He fought in the Battle of Big Bethel below Yorktown, and in every campaign of the Confederate Army of the Potomac.

== Political career ==
After the war, he served in the Georgia Constitutional Convention of 1865, and later that year was elected to the Georgia State Senate for the 23rd District of Georgia. He served in the state senate for six years, including four years as chairman of the joint finance committee. He served again in the state's Constitutional Convention of 1877. He was twice elected by the legislature to serve as Circuit Judge of the Macon Circuit.

In September 1887, Simmons was elected associate Justice of the Supreme Court of Georgia. In October 1894, he became Chief Justice, which office he held until his death.

Political offices
Preceded by Samuel A. Hall	Justice of the Supreme Court of Georgia; 1887–1894	Succeeded by Spencer Roane Atkinson
Preceded by Logan Edwin Bleckley	Chief Justice of the Supreme Court of Georgia; 1894–1905	Succeeded by William Hansell Fish
