= Samuel A. Hall =

American judge (died 1887)

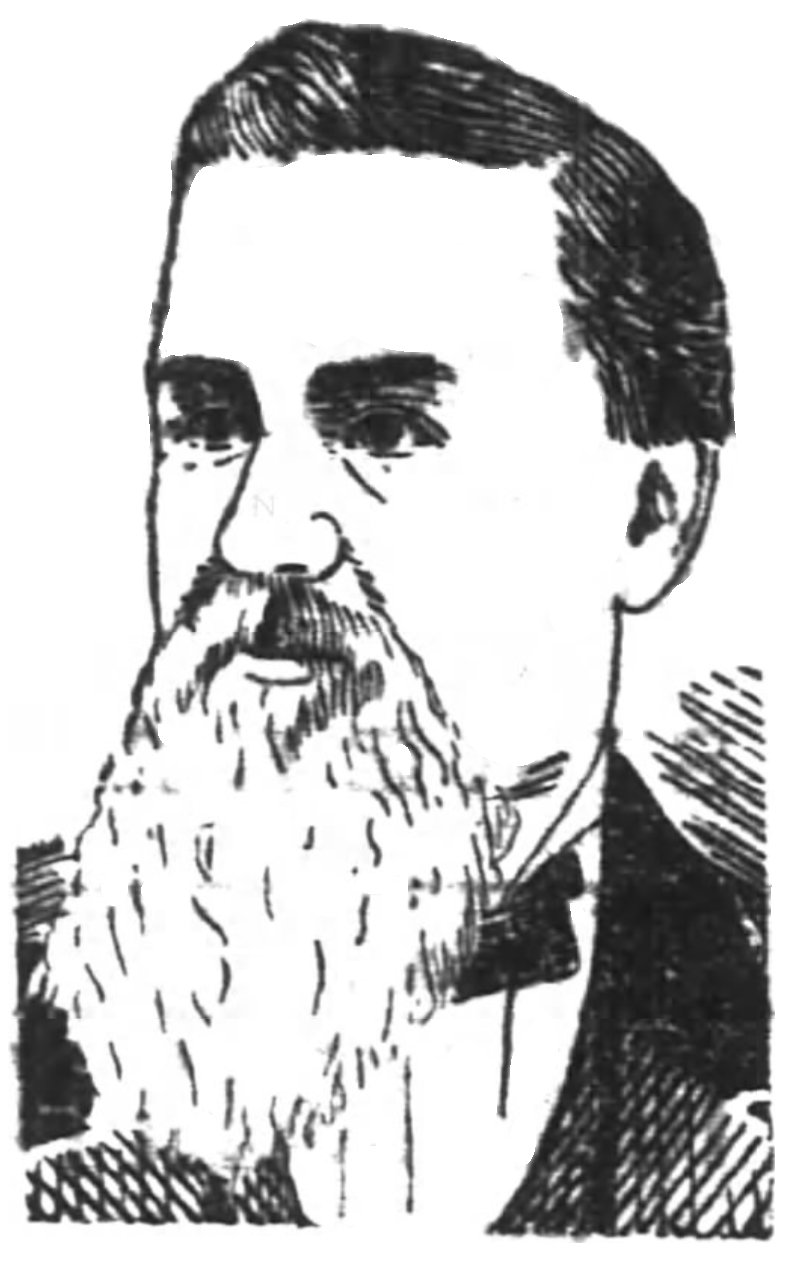
Samuel A. Hall as depicted in The Atlanta Constitution shortly before his death.

Samuel A. Hall (died August 27, 1887) was a justice of the Supreme Court of Georgia from 1882 to 1887.

Born in North Carolina, where his father was an eminent physician, Hall was brought Knoxville, Georgia, in his youth. He graduated from the University of Georgia in 1841, and practiced law in Knoxville and Oglethorpe, moving to Macon, Georgia, in 1850.

In 1882, he was elected by the Georgia General Assembly to the state supreme court, defeating incumbent Alex M. Speer. Hall served in that capacity from November 20, 1882, until his death.

Political offices
Preceded by Alexander M. Speer	Justice of the Supreme Court of Georgia; 1882–1887	Succeeded by Thomas J. Simmons
