= Alexander M. Speer =

American judge (1820–1897)

Alexander Middleton Speer
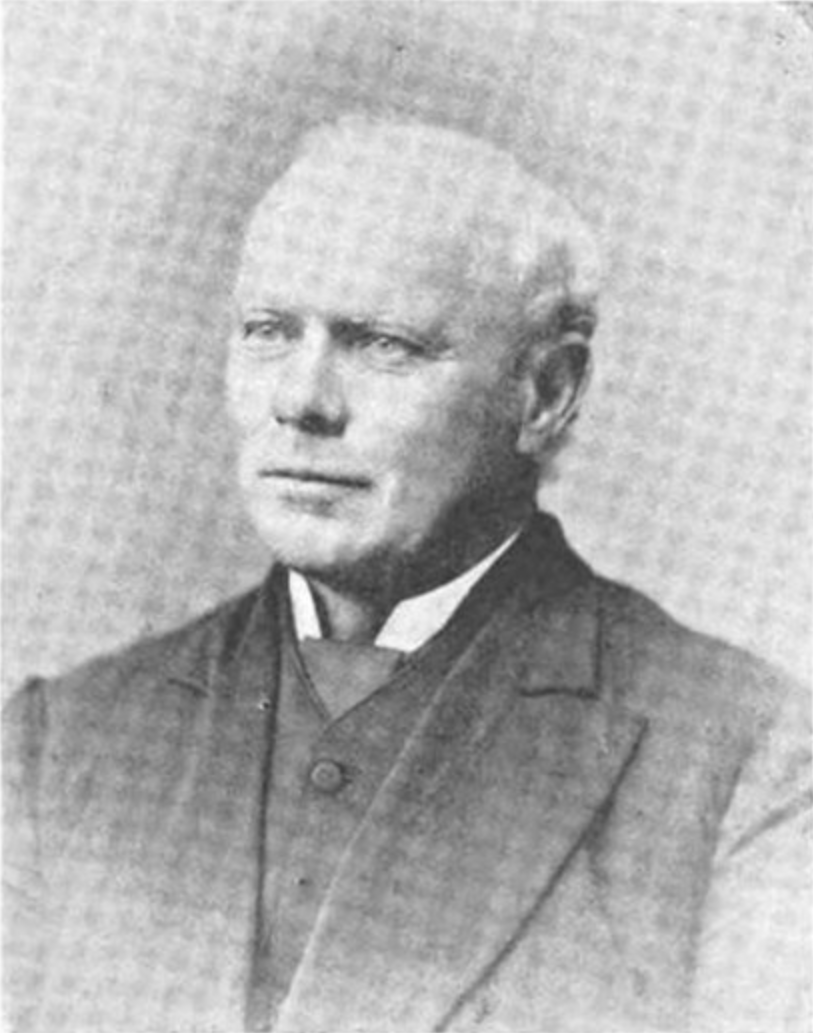

Justice of the Supreme Court of Georgia
- In office 1880–1882
- Preceded by: Willis A. Hawkins
- Succeeded by: Samuel A. Hall

Personal details
- Born: 1820
- Died: March 28, 1897 (aged 77) Madison, Georgia, U.S.
- Spouse(s): Mary Battle (m. 1841; died 1878), Celesta Broughton Sanders (m. 1880)
- Relations: Emory Speer (nephew), Algernon S. Speer (brother), Eustace Willoughby Speer (brother)
- Education: University of Georgia
- Occupation: Lawyer, Judge

Alexander Middleton Speer (1820 – March 28, 1897) was a justice of the Supreme Court of Georgia from 1880 to 1882.

== Early life, education, and career ==
Born in South Carolina, Speer's father, Alexander Speer was "prominent in state affairs". The family moved to Georgia in 1833, and Speer entered the University of Georgia in 1836, graduating in 1839. He read law in the office of Jones & Burnett in Columbus, Georgia, gaining admission to the bar in Georgia in 1840, and practicing in Forsyth, Georgia, and then in Macon, Georgia. In 1853, he became clerk of the Georgia House of Representatives, remaining in that office until 1856.

== Military, political, and judicial service ==
Speer served in the Confederate States Army during the American Civil War, enlisting in the Macon volunteer organization on April 20, 1861, where he was "the eldest member" of the regiment. In 1862, he was elected major of the 46th Georgia Regiment, and then promoted to the rank of lieutenant colonel. He left the military in 1863 and returned to Georgia, where he served in the Georgia State Senate. In 1865, he was appointed judge of the Flint circuit, where he remained until 1868, when he was removed by Governor Rufus Bullock. He then returned to private practice and served in the Georgia House of Representatives for two years before being returned to judicial office. In 1879, he was elected to a seat on the state supreme court vacated by the resignation of Willis Alston Hawkins. Speer remained on the court until 1882.

== Personal life and death ==
Speers had several notable siblings; his older brother Algernon S. Speer became a Florida planter and politician, and his younger brother Eustace Willoughby Speer was a popular minister in the state. Federal judge Emory Speer was his nephew. Speer married Mary Battle in 1841, with whom he had at least four children. Mary died in 1878, and in 1880 Speer married Celesta Broughton Sanders, a widow. Speers died in Madison, Georgia, at the age of 77, following an illness of several months.

Political offices
Preceded by Willis A. Hawkins	Justice of the Supreme Court of Georgia; 1880–1882	Succeeded by Samuel A. Hall
