= Plant soul =

Religious philosophical concept

A plant soul is the religious philosophical concept that plants contain souls. Religions that recognize the existence of plant souls include Jainism and Manichaeism.

== In Jainism ==
Jains believe that plants have souls (jīva) that experience only one sense, which is touch.

The Ācārāṅga Sūtra states that "plants ... and the rest of creation (experience) individually pleasure or displeasure, pain, great terror, and unhappiness" (1.1.6). In another excerpt from the Ācārāṅga Sūtra (1.1.5),

As the nature of men is to be born and to grow old, so is the nature of plants to be born and to grow old;
as men have reason, so plants have reason;
as men fall sick when cut, so plants fall sick when cut;
as men need food, so plants need food;
as men will decay, so plants will decay;
as men are not eternal, so plants are not eternal;
as men take increment, so plants take increment;
as men are changing, so plants are changing.
He who injures plants does not comprehend and renounce the sinful acts;
he who does not injure plants, comprehends and renounces the sinful acts.
Knowing them, a wise man should not act sinfully towards plants, nor cause others to act so, nor allow others to act so.
He who knows these causes of sin relating to plants, is called a reward-knowing sage.

(Note that the pronouns "this" and "that" in Hermann Jacobi's original 1884 translation have been substituted with "men" and "plants".)

== In Manichaeism ==
The Cologne Mani Codex contains stories showing that Manichaeans believed in the existence of sentient plant souls.

In Augustine of Hippo's Confessions (4.10), Augustine wrote that while he was a Manichaean, he believed that "a fig-tree wept when it was plucked, and the tree, its mother, shed milky tears".

=== Influence of Jainism on Manichaeism ===
Fynes (1996) argues that Jain ideas about the existence of plant souls were transmitted from Western Kshatrapa territories to Mesopotamia and then integrated into Manichaean beliefs.

== See also ==
- Plant perception (physiology)
- Plant perception (paranormal)
- Plant rights
- Vegetative soul
