= Logan Edwin Bleckley =

American judge (1827-1907)

Chief Justice of the Supreme Court of Georgia
- In office 1887–1894
- Preceded by: James Jackson
- Succeeded by: Thomas J. Simmons

Personal details
- Born: July 3, 1827 Rabun County, Georgia
- Died: March 6, 1907 (aged 79) Clarkesville, Georgia
- Occupation: Lawyer, jurist

Logan Edwin Bleckley (July 3, 1827 – March 6, 1907) was an American lawyer and jurist.

Born in 1827 on Screamer Mountain in Rabun County, Georgia, Bleckley became a self-taught lawyer. At age eleven, he started working in his father's office (Clerk of the Court in Clayton). He was admitted to the bar in 1846 at age nineteen. During this period of his life, he authored a state bill that outlawed the imprisonment of women for debt and worked with state legislators to have it passed into law.

Two years later, he became a bookkeeper for the State Railroad Office in Atlanta, Georgia. In 1851, he was appointed as a secretary to the governor of Georgia, George W. Towns in Milledgeville (the capital of Georgia at that time), but he left later that year when the new governor, Howell Cobb took office. Bleckley opened his own practice in Atlanta in 1852 at the age of twenty-four.

Bleckley partnered with Basil H. Overby in 1854 to form the firm of Bleckley and Overby. The following year, they added John Brown Gordon, but he left in 1856 to pursue other interests. An interesting note is that all three gentlemen married daughters of General Hugh A. Haralson, a former major general in the state militia, a state congressional representative and a U.S. representative for the state of Georgia. Bleckley married Clara Caroline Haralson, the General's third daughter. Their son, Haralson Bleckley, became an architect and designed the University of Georgia Library Building built in 1904.

In 1857, Bleckley was elected to the office of Solicitor General in his judicial circuit covering eight counties and served in that capacity for the next four years while still maintaining his practice.

In 1861, Bleckley briefly joined the Confederate Army but was discharged for health reasons and returned to his law practice in Atlanta. He was appointed to office of Supreme Court of Georgia Reporter in 1864. He resigned that position in 1867 and returned to his private practice.

In 1875, he was appointed an Associate Justice of the Supreme Court of Georgia by his former law partner, John Brown Gordon, the governor of Georgia at the time. He resigned in 1880. When presiding Chief Justice James Jackson died, Bleckley was appointed as the chief justice of the court in 1887 and presided until his resignation in 1894.

Bleckley died in Clarkesville, Georgia, on March 6, 1907, and is buried at Oakland Cemetery in Atlanta. Bleckley County is named in his honor.

His son, Logan Bleckley Jr., was later appointed the first Clerk of Court to the Georgia Court of Appeals.
