= Plant rights =

Notion of rights to which plants may be entitled

Plant rights are rights to which certain plants may be entitled. Such issues are often raised in connection with discussions about human rights, animal rights, biocentrism, or sentientism.

== Philosophy ==
Samuel Butler's Erewhon contains a chapter, "The Views of an Erewhonian Philosopher Concerning the Rights of Vegetables".

On the question of whether animal rights can be extended to plants, animal rights philosopher Tom Regan argues that animals acquire rights due to being aware, what he calls "subjects-of-a-life". He argues that this does not apply to plants, and that even if plants did have rights, abstaining from eating meat would still be moral due to the use of plants to rear animals.

According to philosopher Michael Marder, the idea that plants should have rights derives from "plant subjectivity", which is distinct from human personhood. Paul W. Taylor holds that all life has inherent worth and argues for respect for plants, but does not assign them rights. Christopher D. Stone, the son of investigative journalist I. F. Stone, proposed in a 1972 paper titled "Should Trees Have Standing?" that, if corporations are assigned rights, so should natural objects such as trees. Citing the broadening of rights of blacks, Jews, women, and fetuses as examples, Stone explains that, throughout history, societies have been conferring rights to new "entities" which, at the time, people thought to be "unthinkable".

Whilst not appealing directly to "rights", Matthew Hall has argued that plants should be included within the realm of human moral consideration. His Plants as Persons: A Philosophical Botany discusses the moral background of plants in western philosophy and contrasts this with other traditions, including indigenous cultures, which recognise plants as persons—active, intelligent beings that are appropriate recipients of respect and care. Hall backs up his call for the ethical consideration of plants with arguments based on plant neurobiology, which says that plants are autonomous, perceptive organisms capable of complex, adaptive behaviours, including recognizing self/non-self.

== Scientific perspective ==
In the study of plant physiology, plants are understood to have mechanisms by which they recognize environmental changes. This definition of plant perception differs from the notion that plants are capable of feeling emotions, an idea also called plant perception. The latter concept, along with plant intelligence, can be traced to 1848, when Gustav Theodor Fechner, a German experimental psychologist, suggested that plants are capable of emotions, and that one could promote healthy growth with talk, attention, and affection.

While plants, as living beings, can perceive and communicate physical stimuli and damage, they are widely regarded as incapable of feeling pain due to the absence of pain receptors, nerves, and a brain, and, by extension, consciousness. Many plants are known to perceive and respond to mechanical stimuli at a cellular level, and some plants such as the venus flytrap or touch-me-not, are known for their "obvious sensory abilities". Despite the scientific uncertainty about what causes consciousness, notably highlighted by the hard problem of consciousness, it is generally considered that none of the members of the plant kingdom can feel pain since they lack any nervous system, notwithstanding their ability to respond to sunlight, gravity, wind, and any external stimuli such as insect bites.

The Swiss Federal Ethics Committee on Non-Human Biotechnology analyzed scientific data on plants, and concluded in 2009 that plants are entitled to a certain amount of "dignity", but "dignity of plants is not an absolute value."

The single-issue Party for Plants entered candidates in the 2010 parliamentary election in the Netherlands. It focuses on topics such as climate, biodiversity and sustainability in general. Such concerns have been criticized as evidence that modern culture is "causing us to lose the ability to think critically and distinguish serious from frivolous ethical concerns".

== Legal arguments ==
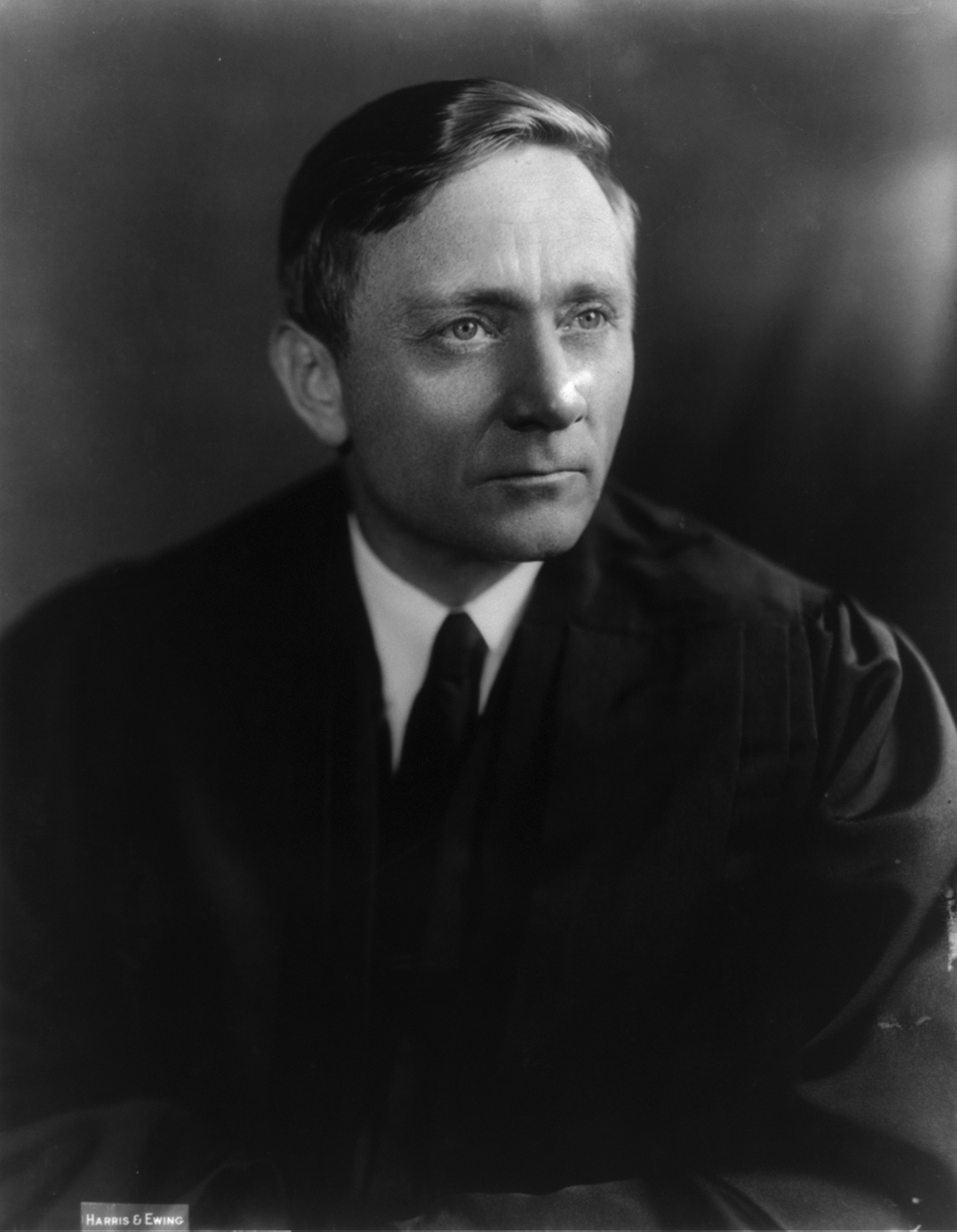
Justice William O. Douglas, author of a noted dissent about the legal standing of plants

In his dissent to the 1972 Sierra Club v. Morton decision by the United States Supreme Court, Justice William O. Douglas wrote about whether plants might have legal standing:

Inanimate objects are sometimes parties in litigation. A ship has a legal personality, a fiction found useful for maritime purposes... So it should be as respects valleys, alpine meadows, rivers, lakes, estuaries, beaches, ridges, groves of trees, swampland, or even air that feels the destructive pressures of modern technology and modern life... The voice of the inanimate object, therefore, should not be stilled.

The Swiss Constitution contains a provision requiring "account to be taken of the dignity of creation when handling animals, plants and other organisms", and the Swiss government has conducted ethical studies pertaining to how the dignity of plants is to be protected.

In 2012, a river in New Zealand, including the plants and other organisms contained within its boundaries, was legally declared a person with standing (via guardians) to bring legal actions to protect its interests.

== See also ==
- Ahimsa-non-human life
- Moral circle expansion
- Moral patienthood
- Plant perception (paranormal)
- Plant soul
- Tree That Owns Itself

== Notes ==
a. Quote: "The absence of a neocortex does not appear to preclude an organism from experiencing affective states. Convergent evidence indicates that non-human animals have the neuroanatomical, neurochemical, and neurophysiological substrates of conscious states along with the capacity to exhibit intentional behaviors. Consequently, the weight of evidence indicates that humans are not unique in possessing the neurological substrates that generate consciousness. Non-human animals, including all mammals and birds, and many other creatures, including octopuses, also possess these neurological substrates."
