= Tree That Owns Itself (Alabama) =

Tree in Alabama

The Tree That Owns Itself
- Location within Alabama
- Species: Post oak (Quercus stellata)
- Location: Eufaula, Alabama
- Coordinates: 31°53′54″N 85°08′46″W
- Date felled: April 9, 1961 (since replaced)
- Custodian: Itself

The Tree That Owns Itself is an oak tree in Eufaula, Alabama. A tree in the same location was given its freedom by E. H. Graves, the mayor of Eufaula, in 1935. Confederate soldier Captain John A. Walker previously owned the land that the tree is on, so the original tree was known as the Walker Oak. The deed also named the tree as the Post Oak Tree. The original Walker Oak was destroyed in 1961 after it was hit by a tornado, and a new tree was planted by the International Paper Company to replace it. An iron sign was affixed to the railings surrounding the new tree; at some point after 1961, the word "Post" was removed from the sign and it was then known only as Oak Tree. The new tree was subsequently replaced again, but each replacement tree has been given the deed to the land.

== Deed ==
In 1935, former mayor of Eufaula, E. H. Graves, recorded a deed giving the tree ownership of itself, including its roots, branches, and trunk. It reads:

I, E. H. Graves, as Mayor of the City of Eufaula, do hereby grant, bargain, sell and convey unto the ‘Post Oak Tree,” not as an individual, partnership nor corporation, but as a creation and gift of the Almighty, standing in our midst—to itself—to have and to hold itself, its branches, limbs, trunk and roots so long as it shall live.

— E. H. Graves

All replacement trees have also been given the deed to their land.

== Plaque ==
There is a large plaque on the fence surrounding the tree. It reads:

THE TREE THAT OWNS ITSELF
Planted and dedicated
April 19, 1961
Replacing the Walker Oak
Felled by wind April 9, 1961
Original deed granted by
CITY OF EUFAULA
To the
[POST] OAK TREE
April 8, 1936
"ONLY GOD CAN MAKE A TREE"
Replacement by International Paper Company

== See also ==
- List of individual trees
- Plant rights
- Individual trees in the United States
