= Duncan School of Law at Lincoln Memorial University =

Private school in Knoxville, Tennessee, US

Coordinates: 35.9655°N 83.9231°W

Lincoln Memorial University Duncan School of Law
- Established: 2009
- School type: Private law school
- Dean: Martin L. Ellin
- Location: Knoxville, Tennessee, U.S.
- USNWR ranking: 175-194 (2026)
- Website: www.lmunet.edu/duncan-school-of-law/

The Duncan School of Law at Lincoln Memorial University is a law school located in Knoxville, Tennessee, affiliated with Lincoln Memorial University. It was founded in 2009 and accredited by the American Bar Association in 2019.

== Duncan School of Law ==
In the spring of 2008, Lincoln Memorial University (LMU) announced plans to seek approval to offer legal education leading to the Juris Doctor degree. The law school, named in honor of Tennessee Congressman John James Duncan, Jr., is located in downtown Knoxville, Tennessee in the building commonly referred to as "Old City Hall." The entering class of the Fall 2011 full-time program had an average LSAT score of 147 while the part-time program had an average LSAT score of 145. These scores represent 33rd and 26th percentile of all LSAT test takers. The average GPA for the entering class of 2011 is 3.01 for the full-time program and 2.99 for the part-time program.

In February 2009, the law school received approval from the Tennessee Board of Law Examiners, which allows Duncan School of Law graduates to apply to take the Tennessee Bar Examination. LMU's law school has 231 students. In December 2011, the American Bar Association (ABA) refused the school's application for provisional accreditation. In reaction, the Duncan School sued the ABA, alleging that the ABA was using accreditation to limit the production of new lawyers, thus violating federal antitrust laws. In January 2012, after a judge denied the school's requests for an injunction and temporary restraining order against the ABA, the school filed an appeal with the ABA. As a result of the ABA's denial of provisional accreditation, numerous students withdrew or sought to transfer from Duncan School of Law.

In February 2012, Duncan School of Law was sued by a former student for "negligent enrollment." The case was dismissed in 2013. LMU-DSOL received provisional accreditation in 2014.

LMU-DSOL was granted full accreditation on March 1, 2019.

LMU-DSOL's 2021 first-time bar passage rate was 50.67%. Of the 2020 graduating class, 62.7% secured full-time long-term bar passage required or JD-advantage employment within 10 months of graduation.
