= James Jackson (congressman) =

American judge (1819–1887)

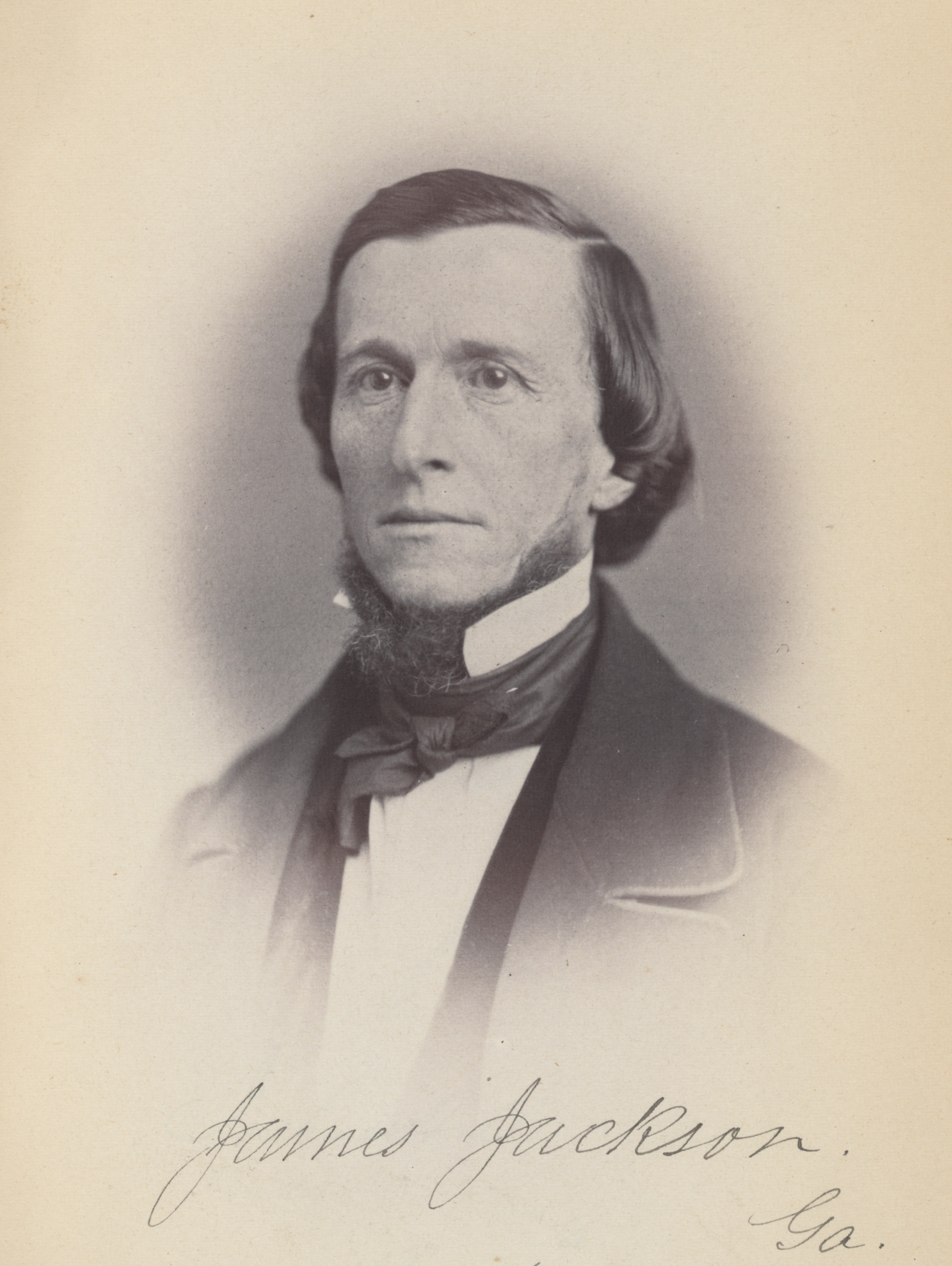

Member of the U.S. House of Representatives from Georgia's 6th district
- In office March 4, 1857 – January 23, 1861
- Preceded by: Howell Cobb
- Succeeded by: American Civil War

Member of the Georgia House of Representatives
- In office 1845–1849

Chief Justice of the Supreme Court of Georgia
- In office 1880–1887
- Preceded by: Hiram B. Warner
- Succeeded by: Logan Edwin Bleckley

Personal details
- Born: October 18, 1819 Jefferson County, Georgia, US
- Died: January 13, 1887 (aged 67)

James Jackson (October 18, 1819 – January 13, 1887) was a United States representative from Georgia, a judge advocate in the American Civil War, and a chief justice of the Supreme Court of Georgia. Jackson was also a trustee of the University of Georgia. He was the son of William Henry Jackson (see Tree That Owns Itself), the grandson of Georgia governor James Jackson, the nephew of Congressman Jabez Young Jackson and first cousin of Howell Cobb.

Jackson was born in Jefferson County, Georgia and named for his famous grandfather. He attended the University of Georgia and graduated in 1837. After passing the bar examination in 1839, he began to practice law in Athens, Georgia. He was elected to the Georgia House of Representatives and served from 1845 to 1849. He concurrently served as judge of the superior court from 1846 to 1859. In 1857, was elected as a Democrat to the Thirty-fifth and Thirty-sixth United States Congresses and served from March 4, 1857, until January 23, 1861. With the secession of Georgia from the Union, he resigned from Congress.

Jackson served as judge advocate on the staff of General Stonewall Jackson. After the war he moved to Macon, Georgia to practice law again. In 1875, he was appointed associate justice of the Supreme Court of Georgia and moved to Atlanta, Georgia. He was named as chief justice of the State supreme court in 1880 and served in this position until his death.

U.S. House of Representatives
| Preceded by Howell Cobb | Member of the U.S. House of Representatives from Georgia's 6th congressional district March 4, 1857 – January 23, 1861 | Succeeded by American Civil War |
Legal offices
| Preceded by Hiram B. Warner | Chief Justices of the Supreme Court of Georgia; 1880–1887 | Succeeded by Logan E. Bleckley |
