= Algernon S. Speer =

American politician

Algernon Sidney Speer

Dr. Algernon Sidney Speer (1818–1857) was a Florida settler and politician, serving as House of Representative for Orange County, Florida in the Florida State Legislature from 1854-1855. Before his political career, he was also a lawyer, horticulturist, farmer. Speer's Landing is named for him.
