= William H. Fish =

American judge (1849–1926)

William Hansell Fish
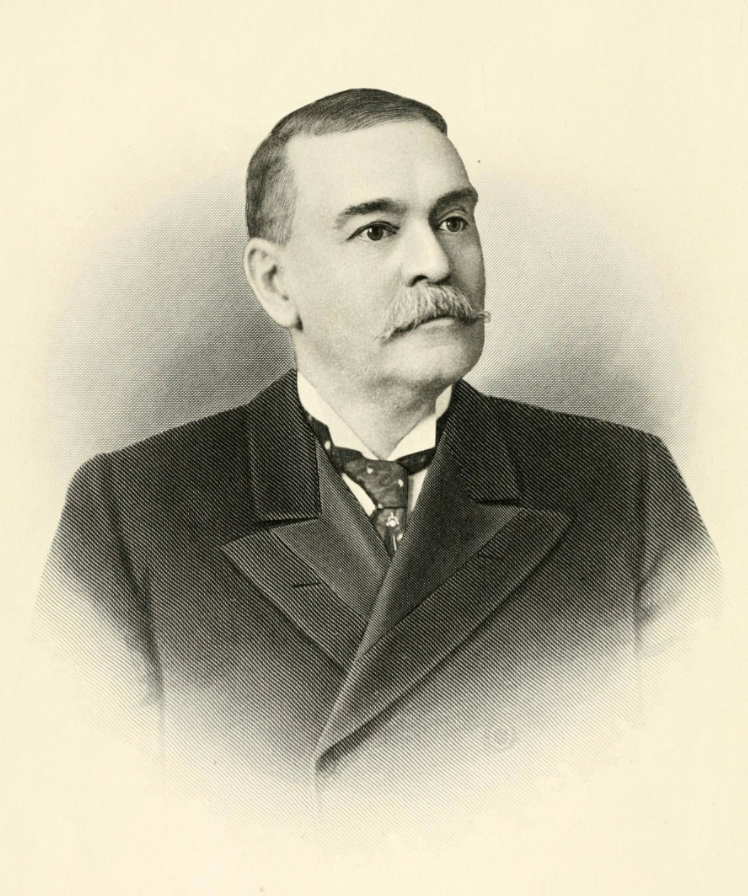
- Justice William H. Fish

Justice of the Supreme Court of Georgia
- In office 1897–1905
- Preceded by: Newly configured court
- Succeeded by: Joseph Henry Lumpkin II

Chief Justice of the Supreme Court of Georgia
- In office 1905–1923
- Preceded by: Thomas J. Simmons
- Succeeded by: Richard Russell Sr.

Personal details
- Born: May 12, 1849 Macon, Georgia, United States
- Died: December 8, 1926 (aged 77)
- Cause of death: Pneumonia
- Spouse: Mary P. Hines (m. 1876)
- Children: 1
- Education: University of Georgia at Athens; University of Virginia School of Law

William Hansell Fish (May 12, 1849 – December 8, 1926) was a justice of the Supreme Court of Georgia from 1897 to 1905; and chief justice from 1905 to 1923.

== Biography ==
Born in Macon, Georgia, to politician and judge George Washington Fish and Martha E. Hansell, Fish attended the schools of Oglethorpe, Georgia, and received his A.B. from the University of Georgia at Athens in 1869. Thereafter he attended the University of Virginia School of Law until 1871, when the death of his father compelled his return to Georgia.

He read law to gain admission to the bar, and in 1877 was appointed to a seat on the County Court of Macon County, Georgia. He remained there until 1891, when he was elevated to a seat on the Georgia Western Circuit. In November 1896, he was elected to one of three new seats created on the state supreme court by an amendment to the state constitution passed the previous month. Fish was elected to the court as a Democrat, along with Samuel Lumpkin, Andrew J. Cobb, and William A. Little, all elected "practically without opposition". In 1903, Fish was made Presiding Justice of the second division of the Supreme Court, and following the death of Chief Justice Simmons in 1905, Governor Joseph M. Terrell appointed Fish to the position of chief justice. Fish was then reelected to that office without opposition. Following his retirement from the court in 1923, Fish served as dean emeritus of the Mercer University School of Law until his death.

On January 11, 1876, Fish married Mary P. Hines, with whom he had one daughter. Fish was stricken with pneumonia while teaching at Mercer, and died at the age of 77.

Political offices
Preceded by Newly reconfigured court	Justice of the Supreme Court of Georgia; 1897–1905	Succeeded by Joseph Henry Lumpkin II
Preceded by Thomas J. Simmons	Chief Justice of the Supreme Court of Georgia; 1905–1923	Succeeded by Richard Russell Sr.
