= List of law schools in the United States =

Law schools in this list are categorized by whether they are currently active or closed; within each section they are listed in alphabetical order by state, then name. All of them grant the Juris Doctor (J.D.) degree, which is the professional degree in law in the United States. Alaska is currently the only state without a law school.

== ABA accredited law schools ==
Law schools are nationally accredited by the American Bar Association (ABA), and graduates of these schools may generally sit for the bar exam in any state. In 2026, there are 198 ABA accredited law schools. The ABA occasionally revokes accreditation, as was done mostly recently with the Thomas Jefferson School of Law in 2019.

=== ABA accredited non-profit schools ===
State (city)	School	Type	Founded	Accredited	Campus
Alabama (Birmingham)	Cumberland School of Law, Samford University	Private	1847	1949	Urban
Alabama (Montgomery)	Thomas Goode Jones School of Law, Faulkner University	Private	1928	2006	Urban
Alabama (Tuscaloosa)	University of Alabama School of Law	Public	1872	1926	Urban (small city)
Arizona (Phoenix)	Sandra Day O'Connor College of Law, Arizona State University	Public	1964	1969	Urban
Arizona (Tucson)	James E. Rogers College of Law, University of Arizona	Public	1915	1930	Urban
Arkansas (Fayetteville)	University of Arkansas School of Law	Public	1924	1926	College town
Arkansas (Little Rock)	William H. Bowen School of Law, University of Arkansas at Little Rock	Public	1975	1969	Urban
California (San Diego)	California Western School of Law	Private	1924	1962	Urban
California (Orange)	Chapman University School of Law	Private	1995	1998	Suburban
California (Los Angeles)	Loyola Law School, Loyola Marymount University	Private	1920	1935	Urban
California (Sacramento)	McGeorge School of Law, University of the Pacific	Private	1924	1969	Urban
California (Malibu)	Pepperdine University School of Law	Private	1971	1972	Suburban
California (Santa Clara)	Santa Clara University School of Law	Private	1912	1937	Suburban
California (Los Angeles)	Southwestern Law School	Private	1911	1970	Urban
California (Stanford)	Stanford Law School	Private	1893	1923	Suburban
California (Berkeley)	University of California, Berkeley School of Law	Public	1894	1923	Urban
California (Davis)	University of California, Davis School of Law (King Hall)	Public	1965	1968	Suburban
California (San Francisco)	University of California College of the Law, San Francisco	Public	1878	1939	Urban
California (San Francisco)	Golden Gate University School of Law, Golden Gate University	Private	1901	1971	Urban
California (Irvine)	University of California, Irvine School of Law	Public	2009	2011	Suburban
California (Los Angeles)	University of California, Los Angeles School of Law	Public	1949	1950	Urban
California (San Diego)	University of San Diego School of Law	Private	1954	1961	Urban
California (San Francisco)	University of San Francisco School of Law	Private	1912	1935	Urban
California (Los Angeles)	Gould School of Law, University of Southern California	Private	1896	1924	Urban
Colorado (Boulder)	University of Colorado Law School	Public	1892	1923	Urban
Colorado (Denver)	Sturm College of Law, University of Denver	Private	1892	1923	Urban
Connecticut (Hamden)	Quinnipiac University School of Law	Private	1977	1992	Suburban
Connecticut (Hartford)	University of Connecticut School of Law	Public	1921	1933	Urban
Connecticut (New Haven)	Yale Law School	Private	1843	1923	Urban
Delaware (Wilmington)	Widener University Delaware Law School	Private	1971	1975	Urban
Delaware (Wilmington)	Wilmington University Farnan School of Law	Private	2023	2025	Urban
District of Columbia	Columbus School of Law, The Catholic University of America	Private	1897	1925	Urban
District of Columbia	David A. Clarke School of Law, University of the District of Columbia	Public	1972	1991	Urban
District of Columbia	George Washington University Law School	Private	1865	1923	Urban
District of Columbia	Georgetown University Law Center	Private	1870	1924	Urban
District of Columbia	Howard University School of Law	Private	1869	1931	Urban
District of Columbia	American University Washington College of Law, American University	Private	1896	1940	Urban
Florida (Orlando)	Barry University, Dwayne O. Andreas School of Law	Private	1999	2002	Suburban
Florida (Orlando)	Florida A&M University College of Law	Public	2000	2004	Urban
Florida (Miami)	Florida International University College of Law	Public	2000	2004	Urban
Florida (Tallahassee)	Florida State University College of Law	Public	1966	1968	Urban
Florida (Gainesville)	University of Florida Levin College of Law	Public	1909	1925	Suburban
Florida (Davie)	Shepard Broad College of Law, Nova Southeastern University	Private	1974	1975	Suburban
Florida (Miami Gardens)	Benjamin L. Crump College of Law, St. Thomas University	Private	1984	1988	Urban
Florida (Gulfport)	Stetson University College of Law	Private	1900	1930	Suburban
Florida (Coral Gables)	University of Miami School of Law	Private	1926	1941	Suburban
Florida (Naples)	Ave Maria School of Law	Private	2000	2002	Suburban
Florida (Jacksonville)	Jacksonville University College of Law	Private	2022	2024	Urban
Georgia (Atlanta)	Atlanta's John Marshall Law School	Private	1933	2005	Urban
Georgia (Atlanta)	Emory University School of Law	Private	1916	1923	Suburban
Georgia (Atlanta)	Georgia State University College of Law	Public	1982	1984	Urban
Georgia (Athens)	University of Georgia School of Law	Public	1859	1930	College town
Georgia (Macon)	Mercer University School of Law, Mercer University	Private	1873	1925	Urban
Hawaii (Honolulu)	William S. Richardson School of Law, University of Hawaiʻi	Public	1968	1974	Urban
Idaho (Moscow), (Boise)	University of Idaho College of Law	Public	1909	1925	Rural
Illinois (Chicago)	Chicago-Kent College of Law, Illinois Institute of Technology	Private	1888	1936	Urban
Illinois (Chicago)	DePaul University College of Law	Private	1897	1925	Urban
Illinois (Champaign)	University of Illinois College of Law	Public	1897	1923	Urban
Illinois (Chicago)	University of Illinois Chicago School of Law	Public	1899	1951	Urban
Illinois (Chicago)	Loyola University Chicago School of Law	Private	1909	1925	Urban
Illinois (DeKalb)	Northern Illinois University College of Law	Public	1975	1978	College town (suburban)
Illinois (Chicago)	Northwestern University School of Law	Private	1859	1923	Urban
Illinois (Carbondale)	Southern Illinois University School of Law	Public	1973	1974	College town
Illinois (Chicago)	University of Chicago Law School	Private	1902	1923	Urban
Indiana (Bloomington)	Maurer School of Law, Indiana University Bloomington	Public	1842	1923	Small city
Indiana (Indianapolis)	Indiana University Robert H. McKinney School of Law	Public	1895	1944	Urban
Indiana (Notre Dame)	Notre Dame Law School	Private	1869	1925	Suburban
Iowa (Des Moines)	Drake University Law School	Private	1865	1923	Urban
Iowa (Iowa City)	University of Iowa College of Law	Public	1865	1923	Urban
Kansas (Lawrence)	University of Kansas School of Law	Public	1893	1923	College town, urban
Kansas (Topeka)	Washburn University School of Law	Public	1903	1923	Urban
Kentucky (Highland Heights)	Salmon P. Chase College of Law, Northern Kentucky University	Public	1893	1954	Suburban
Kentucky (Louisville)	Louis D. Brandeis School of Law, University of Louisville	Public	1846	1931	Urban
Kentucky (Lexington)	University of Kentucky J. David Rosenberg College of Law	Public	1908	1925	Urban
Louisiana (Baton Rouge)	Paul M. Hebert Law Center, Louisiana State University	Public	1906	1926	Urban
Louisiana (New Orleans)	Loyola University New Orleans College of Law	Private	1914	1931	Urban
Louisiana (Baton Rouge)	Southern University Law Center	Public	1946	1953	Urban
Louisiana (New Orleans)	Tulane University Law School	Private	1847	1925	Urban
Maine (Portland)	University of Maine School of Law	Public	1961	1962	Urban
Maryland (Baltimore)	University of Baltimore School of Law	Public	1925	1972	Urban
Maryland (Baltimore)	University of Maryland Francis King Carey School of Law	Public	1823	1930	Urban
Massachusetts (Newton)	Boston College Law School	Private	1929	1932	Suburban
Massachusetts (Boston)	Boston University School of Law	Private	1872	1925	Urban
Massachusetts (Cambridge)	Harvard Law School	Private	1817	1923	Urban
Massachusetts (Boston)	New England Law Boston	Private	1908	1969	Urban
Massachusetts (Boston)	Northeastern University School of Law	Private	1898	1969	Urban
Massachusetts (Boston)	Suffolk University Law School	Private	1906	1953	Urban
Massachusetts (Dartmouth)	University of Massachusetts School of Law	Public	1982	2012	Suburban
Massachusetts (Springfield)	Western New England University School of Law	Private	1919	1974	Suburban
Michigan (East Lansing)	Michigan State University College of Law	Public	1891	1941	Suburban
Michigan (Lansing) Florida (Temple Terrace)	Cooley Law School	Private	1972	1975	Urban
Michigan (Detroit)	University of Detroit Mercy School of Law	Private	1912	1933	Urban
Michigan (Ann Arbor)	University of Michigan Law School	Public	1859	1923	Urban
Michigan (Detroit)	Wayne State University Law School	Public	1927	1937	Urban
Minnesota (Minneapolis)	University of Minnesota Law School	Public	1888	1923	Urban
Minnesota (Minneapolis)	University of St. Thomas School of Law	Private	1999	2003	Urban
Minnesota (Saint Paul)	Mitchell Hamline School of Law	Private	1900	2015	Urban
Mississippi (Jackson)	Mississippi College School of Law	Private	1930	1980	Urban
Mississippi (Oxford)	University of Mississippi School of Law	Public	1854	1930	Rural (small college town)
Missouri (St. Louis)	Saint Louis University School of Law	Private	1843	1924	Urban
Missouri (Columbia)	University of Missouri School of Law	Public	1872	1923	Urban, college town
Missouri (Kansas City)	University of Missouri–Kansas City School of Law	Public	1895	1936	Urban
Missouri (St. Louis)	Washington University School of Law	Private	1867	1923	Urban
Montana (Missoula)	Alexander Blewett III School of Law, University of Montana	Public	1911	1923	College town
Nebraska (Omaha)	Creighton University School of Law	Private	1904	1924	Urban
Nebraska (Lincoln)	University of Nebraska College of Law	Public	1888	1923	Urban
Nevada (Las Vegas)	William S. Boyd School of Law, University of Nevada, Las Vegas	Public	1998	2000	Urban
New Hampshire (Concord)	University of New Hampshire School of Law	Public	1973	1974	Urban
New Jersey (Camden and Newark)	Rutgers Law School	Public	1908	1941	Urban
New Jersey (Newark)	Seton Hall University School of Law	Private	1951	1951	Urban
New Mexico (Albuquerque)	University of New Mexico School of Law	Public	1947	1948	Urban
New York (Albany)	Albany Law School, Union University	Private	1851	1930	Urban
New York (New York City)	Benjamin N. Cardozo School of Law, Yeshiva University	Private	1976	1978	Urban
New York (New York City)	Brooklyn Law School	Private	1901	1937	Urban
New York (Buffalo)	University at Buffalo Law School, SUNY	Public	1887	1936	Urban
New York (New York City)	Columbia Law School	Private	1858	1923	Urban
New York (Ithaca)	Cornell Law School	Private	1887	1923	Rural (small city)
New York (New York City)	City University of New York School of Law	Public	1983	1985	Urban
New York (New York City)	Fordham University School of Law	Private	1905	1936	Urban
New York (Hempstead)	Maurice A. Deane School of Law at Hofstra University	Private	1970	1971	Suburban
New York (Central Islip)	Touro College Jacob D. Fuchsberg Law Center	Private	1980	1983	Suburban
New York (New York City)	New York Law School	Private	1891	1954	Urban
New York (New York City)	New York University School of Law	Private	1835	1930	Urban
New York (White Plains)	Elisabeth Haub School of Law at Pace University	Private	1976	1978	Suburban
New York (New York City)	St. John's University School of Law	Private	1925	1937	Urban
New York (Syracuse)	Syracuse University College of Law	Private	1895	1923	Urban
North Carolina (Durham)	Duke University School of Law	Private	1904	1931	Urban
North Carolina (Greensboro)	Elon University School of Law	Private	2006	2008	Urban
North Carolina (Durham)	North Carolina Central University School of Law	Public	1940	1950	Urban
North Carolina (Raleigh)	Norman Adrian Wiggins School of Law, Campbell University	Private	1976	1979	Urban
North Carolina (Chapel Hill)	University of North Carolina School of Law	Public	1845	1923	College town
North Carolina (Winston-Salem)	Wake Forest University School of Law	Private	1894	1936	Urban
North Carolina (High Point)	High Point University Kenneth F. Kahn School of Law	Private	2022	2026	Suburban
North Dakota (Grand Forks)	University of North Dakota School of Law	Public	1899	1923	Urban
Ohio (Cleveland)	Cleveland State University College of Law	Public	1897	1957	Urban
Ohio (Columbus)	Ohio State University Moritz College of Law, Ohio State University	Public	1891	1923	Urban
Ohio (Cincinnati)	University of Cincinnati College of Law	Public	1833	1923	Urban
Ohio (Cleveland)	Case Western Reserve University School of Law	Private	1892	1923	Urban
Ohio (Columbus)	Capital University Law School	Private	1903	1950	Urban
Ohio (Dayton)	University of Dayton School of Law	Private	1974	1975	Urban
Ohio (Toledo)	University of Toledo College of Law	Public	1906	1939	Urban
Ohio (Ada)	Claude W. Pettit College of Law, Ohio Northern University	Private	1885	1948	Rural
Ohio (Akron)	University of Akron School of Law	Public	1921	1961	Urban
Oklahoma (Oklahoma City)	Oklahoma City University School of Law	Private	1907	1960	Urban
Oklahoma (Norman)	University of Oklahoma College of Law	Public	1909	1923	Suburban
Oklahoma (Tulsa)	University of Tulsa College of Law	Private	1923	1950	Urban
Oregon (Eugene), (Portland)	University of Oregon School of Law	Public	1884	1923	Urban
Oregon (Salem)	Willamette University College of Law	Private	1883	1938	Urban
Oregon (Portland)	Lewis & Clark Law School	Private	1915	1970	Urban
Pennsylvania (Philadelphia)	Drexel University Thomas R. Kline School of Law	Private	2006	2008	Urban
Pennsylvania (Pittsburgh)	Thomas R. Kline School of Law of Duquesne University	Private	1911	1960	Urban
Pennsylvania (Philadelphia)	Temple University Beasley School of Law	Public	1895	1933	Urban
Pennsylvania (Carlisle and University Park)	Penn State Dickinson Law	Public	1834	1931	Rural
Pennsylvania (Philadelphia)	University of Pennsylvania Law School	Private	1850	1923	Urban
Pennsylvania (Pittsburgh)	University of Pittsburgh School of Law	Public	1895	1923	Urban
Pennsylvania (Radnor)	Villanova University School of Law	Private	1953	1954	Suburban
Pennsylvania (Harrisburg)	Widener University Commonwealth Law School	Private	1989	1988	Urban
Puerto Rico (San Juan)	Interamerican University of Puerto Rico School of Law	Private	1961	1969	Urban
Puerto Rico (Ponce)	Pontifical Catholic University of Puerto Rico School of Law	Private	1948	1967	Small city
Puerto Rico (San Juan)	University of Puerto Rico School of Law	Public	1913	1945	Urban
Rhode Island (Bristol)	Roger Williams University School of Law	Private	1992	1995	Suburban
South Carolina (Charleston)	Charleston School of Law	Private	2003	2006	Urban
South Carolina (Columbia)	Joseph F. Rice School of Law, University of South Carolina	Public	1867	1925	Urban
South Dakota (Vermillion)	University of South Dakota School of Law	Public	1901	1923	Urban
Tennessee (Nashville)	Belmont University College of Law	Private	2011	2013	Urban
Tennessee (Memphis)	Cecil C. Humphreys School of Law, University of Memphis	Public	1962	1965	Urban
Tennessee (Knoxville)	Duncan School of Law, Lincoln Memorial University	Private	2009	2014	Urban
Tennessee (Knoxville)	University of Tennessee College of Law	Public	1890	1925	Urban
Tennessee (Nashville)	Vanderbilt University Law School	Private	1874	1925	Urban
Texas (Waco)	Baylor Law School, Baylor University	Private	1845	1931	Urban (college town)
Texas (Dallas)	Dedman School of Law, Southern Methodist University	Private	1911	1927	Urban
Texas (Dallas)	University of North Texas at Dallas College of Law	Public	2014	2022	Urban
Texas (Houston)	Thurgood Marshall School of Law, Texas Southern University	Public	1947	1949	Urban
Texas (Houston)	University of Houston Law Center	Public	1947	1950	Urban
Texas (Houston)	South Texas College of Law Houston	Private	1923	1959	Urban
Texas (Lubbock)	Texas Tech University School of Law	Public	1967	1969	Urban
Texas (Austin)	University of Texas School of Law	Public	1883	1923	Urban
Texas (Fort Worth)	Texas A&M University School of Law	Public	1992	1994	Urban
Texas (San Antonio)	St. Mary's University School of Law	Private	1927	1948	Urban
Utah (Provo)	J. Reuben Clark Law School, Brigham Young University	Private	1973	1974	Suburban
Utah (Salt Lake City)	S.J. Quinney College of Law, University of Utah	Public	1913	1927	Urban
Vermont (South Royalton)	Vermont Law and Graduate School	Private	1972	1975	Rural
Virginia (Grundy)	Appalachian School of Law	Private	1994	2001	Rural
Virginia (Arlington)	Antonin Scalia Law School, George Mason University	Public	1972	1980	Urban/suburban
Virginia (Lynchburg)	Liberty University School of Law	Private	2004	2006	Suburban
Virginia (Virginia Beach)	Regent University School of Law	Private	1986	1989	Suburban
Virginia (Lexington)	Washington and Lee University School of Law	Private	1849	1923	Rural
Virginia (Williamsburg)	William & Mary Law School	Public	1779	1932	Rural / suburban
Virginia (Richmond)	University of Richmond School of Law	Private	1870	1928	Urban
Virginia (Charlottesville)	University of Virginia School of Law	Public	1826	1923	Small city (rural / suburban)
Washington (Spokane)	Gonzaga University School of Law	Private	1912	1951	Urban
Washington (Seattle)	Seattle University School of Law	Private	1972	1994	Urban
Washington (Seattle)	University of Washington School of Law	Public	1889	1924	Urban
West Virginia (Morgantown)	West Virginia University College of Law	Public	1878	1923	Urban
Wisconsin (Milwaukee)	Marquette University Law School	Private	1892	1925	Urban
Wisconsin (Madison)	University of Wisconsin Law School	Public	1868	1923	Urban
Wyoming (Laramie)	University of Wyoming College of Law	Public	1920	1923	Small city

=== ABA accredited for-profit schools ===
State (city)	School	Founded	Accredited
California (Irvine)	Western State College of Law at Westcliff University	1966	2005

== State approved law schools ==
In addition, individual state legislatures or bar examiners, like the State Bar of California, may maintain a separate approval system which is open to non-ABA accredited schools. As of 2026, 21 law schools are approved by the State Bar of California.

Also, the CBE allows registered unaccredited schools to operate and students of those schools are eligible to take the California Bar Examination upon graduation. 9 other law schools, primarily correspondence and online law schools, although not accredited, are registered by the Committee of Bar Examiners of the State Bar of California. This means that the graduates of these law schools can sit for the California Bar Examination and, under varying circumstances, the bar exams in other states.

In California in 2022, 75% of ABA-accredited law school graduates passed the bar, 36% of State Bar of California approved law school graduates and 13% of unaccredited law school graduates.

The other states that have non-ABA accredited law schools are Alabama, Massachusetts, and Tennessee.

State	City	School	Type	Founded	accredited	Bar passage rate	Campus
Alabama	Birmingham	Birmingham School of Law	For–profit	1915	Yes	12.5% (2023)	urban
Alabama	Birmingham	Miles Law School	Non–profit	1974	Yes	7.1% (2019)	suburban
California	Chico	Cal Northern School of Law	For–profit	1992	1983	74.4% (2024)	small/medium city
California	Clovis	San Joaquin College of Law	Non–profit	1969	Yes	62% (2025)	medium city
California	Fresno	Oak Brook College of Law and Government Policy	Non–profit	1994	No (registered)	52.9% (2000–2025)	correspondence
California	Indio	California Desert Trial Academy College of Law	For–profit	2012	No (registered)		small city
California	Inglewood, Chatsworth	University of West Los Angeles School of Law	For–profit	1966	1978	45.3% (2024)	suburban
California	Los Angeles	Abraham Lincoln University School of Law	For–profit	1996	No (registered)	8% (2022)	online
California	Los Angeles	Purdue Global Law School, Purdue University Global	Public	1998	2020	74.3% (2024)	online
California	online	JFK School of Law, National University	Non–profit	1965	Yes	60% (2019–2024)	online
California	Ontario	University of La Verne College of Law	Non–profit	1970	2020	61.5% (2025)	suburban
California	Menlo Park	St. Francis School of Law	Non–profit	2011	Yes	53.8% (2016–2022)	online
California	Sacramento	Lincoln Law School of Sacramento	For–profit	1969	Yes	46% (2025)	urban
California	Sacramento	Northwestern California University School of Law	For–profit	1982	2020	50% (2025)	online
California	San Diego	Thomas Jefferson School of Law	Non–profit	1969	2020	4% (2023)	urban
California	San Francisco	San Francisco Law School, Alliant International University	For–profit	1909	No (unregistered)	7% (2022)	urban
California	San Jose	Lincoln Law School of San Jose	Non–profit	1919	1993	53.1% (2019–2024)	urban
California	Santa Ana	Taft Law School at William Howard Taft University	For–profit	1984	No (registered)	9% (2023)	online
California	Santa Ana	Trinity Law School, Trinity International University	Non–profit	1980	Yes	18% (2023)	suburban
California	Santa Barbara	California School of Law	For–profit	2007	No (registered)	81% (2020–2025)	distance-learning
California	Seaside	Monterey College of Law	Non–profit	1972	1981	61.2% (2025)	small city
California	Stockton	Laurence Drivon School of Law, Humphreys University	Non–profit	1951	Yes	13% (2015)	suburban
California	Torrance	American Institute of Law	For–profit	2010	No (registered)		correspondence
California	Ventura	Colleges of Law	Non–profit	1969	Yes	47% (2023)	suburban
California	Ventura, Santa Barbara	Southern California Institute of Law	For–profit	1986	No (registered)	14.3% (2024)	online
Massachusetts	Andover	Massachusetts School of Law	Non–profit	1988	1997 (can also take bar exam in Connecticut)	73% (2024)	suburban
Tennessee	Nashville	Nashville School of Law	Non–profit	1911	2001	68.5% (2019)	suburban

== Defunct ==
See List of defunct law schools in the United States for law schools that once operated but have sinced closed.

== See also ==
- History of the American legal profession
- Law school in the United States
- Law school rankings in the United States
- Legal education in the United States
- List of defunct law schools in the United States
- List of law school GPA curves
- List of law schools attended by United States Supreme Court justices
- Lists of law schools
- Online law school
- Reading law
- Catholic University of America School of Canon Law
