= Correspondence law school =

A correspondence law school is a school that offers legal education by distance education, either by correspondence or online by use of the internet, or a combination thereof.

== Germany ==
Distance legal education in Germany is available through the University of Hagen, a public university similar to the Open University in the United Kingdom. The graduates receive LLB or LLM degrees. Specialized LLB degrees in business law are available through five universities of applied sciences: Hamburger Fernhochschule, Nordhausen University of Applied Sciences, Europäische Fernhochschule Hamburg,South Westphalia University of Applied Sciences, and the Niederrhein University of Applied Sciences.

== South Africa ==
Distance legal education is a permissible method to become a lawyer in South Africa, and has been available through the University of South Africa (UNISA) since 2018.

== United Kingdom ==
Distance legal education in the United Kingdom is accepted by the Law Society of England and Wales as a qualifying law degree and one of the possible ways to become a solicitor or a barrister. Several institutions offer basic legal education leading to the LLB degree, the oldest of which is the University of London External System. Numerous universities in the UK offer LLB degrees through distance education today, including the Open University.

In other countries influenced by the British legal heritage, legal education can be obtained through distance education, including Australia.

== United States ==
=== History ===
Law school study by correspondence has existed in the United States since 1889 when Sprague Correspondence School of Law was established by William C. Sprague in Detroit, Michigan. It eventually merged with Blackstone Institute, and later was known as Blackstone School of Law. Among the school’s early graduates was Antoinette D. Leach, who in 1893 became the first woman admitted by the Indiana Supreme Court to practice law in Indiana.

In 1908, La Salle Extension University was founded in Chicago by Jesse Grant Chapline. LSEU was involved in several lawsuits and counter-suits by the Federal Trade Commission over the law degree it advertised. In 1973, La Salle Extension University was charged by FTC (D. 5907) for "involving misrepresentations about obtaining law degrees through a correspondence course." FTC ordered that the university be required to include a disclaimer in advertisements for its law distance program that read: "No state accepts any law home study course, including La Salle's, as sufficient education to qualify for admission to practice law." La Salle Extension University closed its law school program in 1980 following the litigation involving the FTC.

Among the La Salle Extension University graduates who practiced as attorneys were governors Harold J. Arthur and Eurith D. Rivers, U.S. Representatives John S. Gibson and Civil Rights activist and Gertrude Rush.

Other correspondence law schools included the American Correspondence School of Law of Chicago, Columbian Correspondence College of Law in Washington D.C., and New York Correspondence School of Law in New York. They were innovative for the time in providing many poor, working-class, women, and ethnic minorities educational opportunities.

In 1994, the St. Petersburg Times in Florida published information about a Rev. James Kirk who opened a diploma mill calling it LaSalle University in Slidell, Louisiana, which, while being investigated by Louisiana authorities, "contend[ed] it [was] exempt from licensing because even though it offers degrees in engineering and law, it is a religious institution."

=== 21st century ===
In 2002, the ABA said it had no plans to accredit a fully-online law school.

In 2015, Mitchell Hamline School of Law was the first "ABA-approved law school to receive an ABA variance to offer a half on-campus/half online JD program." In 2018, Syracuse University College of Law was given approval by the ABA to conduct a JD program that was mostly online.

Before the COVID-19 pandemic, online law schools were uncommon outside of California. As of 2026, 22 ABA accredited law schools have JD programs with at least a 50 percent online component, with 9 of those programs listed as fully online. The others have residencies ranging from a few days a year to in-person sessions on weekends.

=== ABA law schools with fully online programs ===
- Arizona State University Sandra Day O’Connor College of Law
- Case Western Reserve University School of Law
- Mitchell Hamline School of Law
- Ohio Northern University Claude W. Pettit College of Law
- St. Mary’s University School of Law
- Southwestern Law School
- Suffolk University Law School
- University of Detroit Mercy School of Law
- University of Hawai’i, William S. Richardson School of Law

== Correspondence and online legal education in California ==
=== Overview ===
In California, students can attend unaccredited law schools for 4 years through either a correspondence or online law school. Once a law student has successfully completed their first year of law school, Business and Professions Code section 6060 requires the student to take and pass the First Year Law Student Examination (FYLSE), commonly known as the "baby bar", within the first three attempts of becoming eligible. If student fails to do so, all law school education beyond year one will be ignored by the state, the student must pass this exam before becoming a lawyer if they have obtained their entire degree online, or by correspondence law school. In the United States, non-ABA approved law schools and online/correspondence schools, which primarily exist in California, have lower bar passage rates than ABA-approved and traditional brick and mortar law schools.

In 2007, the California State Legislature passed legislation transferring oversight authority of unaccredited law schools from the Bureau for Private Postsecondary and Vocational Education (which oversees non-law education), to the State Bar in response to the historically low bar passage rate of students graduating from unaccredited law schools, including correspondence/online schools.

Beginning in 2019, the State Bar of California allowed online law schools to become accredited by the State Bar of California, effectively creating three tiers of law schools in California, namely:

1. Those with ABA accreditation
2. Those with State Bar of California accreditation and
3. Unaccredited but registered law schools.

In order to achieve State Bar of California accreditation, law schools must have a "a 5-year cumulative bar pass rate of 40%."

Those who pass the California bar exam and meet the other requirements of California may practice law in California, as well as practice federal law (such as immigration law, etc.) in all states.

=== History ===
In 1996, Abraham Lincoln University began a hybrid in-class and correspondence approach to law school, designed to offer scheduling flexibility to students, before adding an online component in 2004.

The first law school to offer a degree program completely online was Concord Law School, then owned by Kaplan, Inc. It later would become the law school of Purdue University Global, the online division for Purdue University, which also began its life as Kaplan University in 1998. At the time of its opening, it was critcized by Supreme Court Justice Ruth Bader Ginsberg.

Concord graduated its first class in November 2002. In 2006, Concord was the largest of the seven distance learning law schools operating at the time.

Northwestern California University School of Law is the oldest existing correspondence law school in the United States. It was founded in 1982 and began presenting its correspondence program entirely online in 2002.

=== California Bar passage rates ===
Statistics for the California Bar Examination and First-Year Law Students' Examination ("Baby Bar"), including those for correspondence law schools and distance learning law schools, are provided by the California State Bar. In California in 2022, 75% of ABA-accredited law school graduates passed the bar, 36% of State Bar of California approved law school graduates and 13% of unaccredited law school graduates.

=== Accreditation and acceptance of credentials ===
The other states have varying rules for graduates of correspondence and distance learning law schools registered with the California State Bar: (a) a few states allow such graduates to immediately sit for the bar exams after graduation; (b) some states allow such graduates to sit for the bar exam immediately after passing the California Bar Exam; (c) several states allow graduates of correspondence and distance learning law schools to sit for the bar exams after passing the California Bar Exam and then gaining experience as an attorney: and (d) some states do not allow such graduates to ever sit for their bar exams.

Graduates of California online schools have commenced legal actions in order to sit for the bar exam in their home states. Mel Thompson, a 2005 graduate of the West Coast School of Law, sued the ABA and the Connecticut Bar Examining Committee, alleging that Connecticut's refusal to let him sit for the bar exam violated due process, equal protection, and served as an "arbitrary" and unlawful restraint on trade. Thompson's grievance did not succeed and in 2007 his suit was dismissed. In 2007 Ross Mitchell, a 2004 graduate of Concord Law School, filed suit against the Massachusetts Board of Bar Examiners. Mitchell's suit was successful. In 2008 the state’s Supreme Judicial Court granted Mitchell permission to take the Massachusetts bar exam. In 2009 Mitchell passed the bar and became the first online law school graduate sworn into the state bar of Massachusetts.

Proponents of such exclusions argue that without ABA accreditation, there is no effective way to check that a law school meets minimum academic standards and that its graduates are prepared to become attorneys.

Concord Law School Dean Barry Currier maintains optimism regarding the acceptance of non-ABA online law school degrees, saying that "once people see what we do over time, the degrees will be accepted." William Hunt, Dean of The California School of Law has noted that online schools have the ability to utilize the Socratic Method pedagogy as it is used at traditional law schools. Law professor Michael Froomkin made a similar point, "The losers in the new era of legal education will be second- and third-tier institutions that lack name recognition and its concomitant prestige, and their faculties ... They will either have to become discount law schools, or go online themselves."

=== California State Bar accredited law schools with online JD programs ===
- Monterey College of Law (Monterey)
- Northwestern California University School of Law (Sacramento)
- Purdue Global Law School (Los Angeles)
- St. Francis School of Law (Newport Beach)

=== Unaccredited correspondence law schools ===
- American Institute of Law (Torrance)
- Oak Brook College of Law and Government Policy (Fresno)
- Taft Law School (Santa Ana)

=== Unaccredited distance learning law schools ===
- Abraham Lincoln University School of Law (Glendale)
- California School of Law (Santa Barbara)
- San Francisco Law School (Emeryville)
- Southern California Institute of Law (Ventura)

== Teaching Methods ==
=== Socratic Method in traditional law schools ===
Traditional law schools in the United States teach by the question and answer Socratic or casebook method. Law schools using online technology are able to teach by this method through use of the Internet in live audio sessions. In this teaching method, students are assigned case opinions and statutes to read and brief before each class session. This pre-class preparation is followed by in-class (and on-line) presentations by the students. Law schools use the Socratic Method to teach students how to analyze and make legal arguments, how to properly read and brief cases and how to prepare for the pressures and rigors of a legal practice.

It is generally accepted that a crucial part of the Socratic Method process involves students being questioned by the professors, with follow-up questions. It is believed that such pedagogy helps prepare the students for the rigors of law practice, as well as teaching them how to engage in the type of analysis necessary to perform well on state bar attorney licensing exams.

=== Synchronous learning ===
Utilization of the Socratic Method pedagogy by online law schools in the traditional "interactive" direct question and answer format occurs through audio broadcast over the Internet of live sessions with professors calling on students and receiving immediate responses. There are two types of available technologies for online legal education, synchronous and asynchronous.

"Synchronous technology" is a mode of online delivery where all participants are "present" and engaging simultaneously with each other at the same time. Web conferencing tools like Zoom and Microsoft Teams are examples of synchronous technology. This method of instruction has the advantage for online law schools that there is immediate "give and take" interaction in the questioning, answering, discussions and debates by and between the students and professors. As early as 2006, it was argued that synchronous learning should be the primary mode of online legal education.

=== Asynchronous learning ===
"Asynchronous technology" is a mode of online delivery in which the professors and students are not together at the same time and in which students receive course materials and access recorded lectures on their own schedule. Message board forums, e-mail exchanges, text messaging and recorded video are examples of asynchronous technology. This method of instruction has the advantage that the students need not be committed to be present for classes at set days and hours.

At one online law school using asynchronous technology, students may pose questions to the professors by text messaging or email, which the professors usually answer by text messaging or email within 48 hours. Also at this school, during their lectures professors may pose questions to the students, which the students answer by text messaging or emails.

== See also ==
- Lists of law schools – Worldwide listing
- Reading law
