= MacCrate =

MacCrate is a surname. Notable people with the surname include:

- John MacCrate (1885–1976), American lawyer and politician
- Robert MacCrate (1921–2016), American lawyer, son of John
