= Legal education in the United States =

Legal education in the United States generally refers to a graduate degree, the completion of which makes a graduate eligible to sit for an examination for a license to practice as a lawyer. Around 60 percent of those who complete a Juris Doctor degree typically practice law, with the remainder primarily working in business (especially finance, insurance, real estate, and consulting) or government or policy roles, where their degrees also confer advantages.

== History ==
=== The first law schools in Europe ===
The foundations of the first universities in Europe were the glossators of the 11th century, which were schools of law. The first European university, that of Bologna, was founded as a school of law by four famous legal scholars in the 12th century who were students of the glossator school in that city. The first academic title of doctor applied to scholars of law. The University of Bologna served as the model for other law schools of the medieval age. Although it was common for students of law to visit and study at schools in other countries, such was not the case with England because of the English rejection of Roman Law. Although Oxford did teach canonical law, its importance was always superior to civil law in that institution.

=== Early legal education in England ===
In England in 1292, when Edward I first requested that lawyers be trained, law students merely sat in the courts and observed. Over time, the students would hire professionals to lecture them in their residences. This practice led to the institution of the Inns of Court system. The original method of education at the Inns of Court was a mix of moot court-like practice and lecture, and observation of court proceedings. By the 17th century, the Inns obtained a status as a kind of university akin to Oxford and Cambridge, though very specialized in purpose. With the frequent absence of parties to suits during the Crusades, the importance of the lawyer's role grew tremendously, and the demand for lawyers grew. The apprenticeship program for solicitors emerged, structured and governed by the same rules as the apprenticeship programs for the trades Oxford and Cambridge did not see common law as worthy of study, and included coursework in law only in the context of canon and civil law, and for the purpose of the study of philosophy or history only. These universities, therefore, did not train lawyers. Professional training in England was unlike that of continental Europe, where the law was viewed as an academic discipline. Legal educators in England stressed practical training.

The training of solicitors by apprenticeship was formally established by an act of parliament in 1729. William Blackstone became the first lecturer of law at Oxford in 1753. The university did not establish the program for the purpose of professional study, and the lectures were very philosophical and theoretical in nature. Blackstone insisted that the study of law should be university based, where concentration on foundational principles can be had, instead of concentration on detail and procedure obtained through apprenticeship and the Inns of Court.

The Inns of Court continued but became less effective. No significant educational activity or examination was required for bar admission. In 1846, the Parliament examined the education and training of prospective barristers and found the system to be inferior to the legal education provided in Europe and the United States. Therefore, formal schools of law were called for, but not finally established until later in the century. Even then, the bar did not consider a university degree in admission decisions.

=== Legal education in the North American colonies and the United States ===
Initially there was much resistance to lawyers in colonial North America because of the role they played in hierarchical England. Slowly the colonial governments started using the services of professionals trained in the Inns of Court, and by the end of the Revolution there was a functional bar in each state. As institutions for training developed in the colonies, because of the distrust of a profession only open to the elite in England, the institutions which developed in what would become the United States would be much different from those in England.

Initially in the United States, the legal professionals were trained and imported from England. A formal apprenticeship or clerkship program was established first in New York in 1730—at that time a seven-year clerkship was required, and in 1756 a four-year college degree was required in addition to five years of clerking and an examination. Later the requirements were reduced to require only two years of college education. A system like the Inns did not develop, however, and a college education was not required in England until the 19th century, so the American system was unique.

The clerkship program required much individual study. The mentoring lawyer was expected to carefully select materials for study and to guide the clerk in his study of the law to ensure that the material was being absorbed. The student was supposed to compile his notes of his reading of the law into a "commonplace book", which he would endeavor to memorize. Although those were the ideals, in reality the clerks were often overworked and rarely were able to study the law individually as expected. They were often employed to tedious tasks, such as making handwritten copies of documents. Finding sufficient legal texts was also a seriously debilitating issue, and there was no standardization in the books assigned to the clerk trainees because they were assigned by their mentor, whose opinion of the law may have differed greatly from his peers. One famous attorney in the United States, William Livingston, stated in 1745 in a New York newspaper that the clerkship program was severely flawed, and that most mentors "have no manner of concern for their clerk's future welfare… [T]is a monstrous absurdity to suppose, that the law is to be learnt by a perpetual copying of precedents." There were some few mentors that were dedicated to the service, and because of their rarity, they became so sought after that the first law schools evolved from the offices of some of these attorneys who took on many clerks and began to spend more time training than practicing law.

It was seen over the years that the apprenticeship program was not adequate for producing lawyers capable of serving their clients. The apprenticeship programs often employed the trainee with menial tasks, and while they were well trained in the day-to-day operations of a law office, they were generally unprepared practitioners or legal reasoners. The establishment of formal faculties of law in U.S. universities did not occur until the latter part of the 18th century. The first law degree granted by a U.S. university was a Bachelor of Law in 1793 by the College of William & Mary, which was abbreviated L.B.; Harvard University was the first university to use the LL.B. abbreviation in the United States.

The first university law programs in the United States included much theoretical and philosophical study, including works such as the Bible, Cicero, Seneca, Aristotle, Adam Smith, Montesquieu and Grotius. It has been said that the early university law schools of the early 19th century seemed to be preparing students for careers as statesmen rather than as lawyers. At the LL.B. programs in the early 1900s at Stanford University and Yale continued to include "cultural study," which consisted of courses in languages, mathematics and economics.

In the 1850s there were many proprietary schools which originated from a practitioner taking on multiple apprentices and establishing a school and which provided a practical legal education, as opposed to the one offered in the universities which offered an education in the theory, history and philosophy of law. The universities assumed that the acquisition of skills would happen in practice, while the proprietary schools concentrated on the practical skills during education.

In part to compete with the small professional law schools, there began a great change in U.S. university legal education. For a short time beginning in 1826 Yale began to offer a complete "practitioners' course" which lasted two years and included practical courses, such as pleading drafting. U.S. Supreme Court justice Joseph Story started the spirit of change in legal education at Harvard when, as a lecturer there in the early 19th century, he advocated a more "scientific study" of the law. Therefore, at Harvard the education was much of a trade school type of approach to legal education, contrary to the more liberal arts education advocated by Blackstone at Oxford and Jefferson at William and Mary. Nonetheless there continued to be debate among educators over whether legal education should be more vocational, as at the private law schools, or through a rigorous scientific method, such as that developed by Story and Langdell. In the words of Dorsey Ellis, "Langdell viewed law as a science and the law library as the laboratory, with the cases providing the basis for learning those 'principles or doctrines' of which 'law, considered as a science, consists.'" Judge James Kent, Francis Hilliard, son of Boston publisher William Hilliard, and Silas Jones, author of An Introduction to Legal Science attempted to emphasize a scientific approach. Nonetheless, into the year 1900 most states did not require a university education (although an apprenticeship was often required) and most practitioners had not attended any law school or college.

Therefore, the modern legal education system in the U.S. is a combination of teaching law as a science and a practical skill, implementing elements such as clinical training, which has become an essential part of legal education in the U.S. and in the J.D. program of study. Whereas in the 18th and 19th century, few U.S. lawyers trained in an apprenticeship "achieved a level of competence necessary to adequately serve their clients," today as a result of the development of the U.S. legal education system, "law graduates perceive themselves to be prepared upon graduation" for the practice of law.

== Faculty ==
=== AALS Faculty Recruitment Conference ===
About half of the faculty hired by law schools in the United States result from interviews conducted at the Association of American Law Schools's annual AALS Faculty Recruitment Conference in Washington, D.C.

== Academic degrees ==
Legal education is typically received through a law school program. The professional degree granted by U.S. law schools is the Juris Doctor (J.D.). Prospective lawyers who have been awarded the J.D. (or other appropriate credential), must fulfill additional, state-specific requirements in order to gain admission to the bar in the United States.

The Juris Doctor (J.D.), like the Doctor of Medicine (M.D.), is a professional doctorate. The American Bar Association issued a Council Statement that the JD is equivalent to the PhD for educational employment purposes. The Doctor of Juridical Science (S.J.D.) ("Scientiae Juridicae Doctor" in Latin), and Doctor of Comparative Law (D.C.L.), are research and academic-based doctorate level degrees. In the U.S., the Legum Doctor is only awarded as an honorary degree.

As of July 2012, Yale Law School offers a Ph.D. in Law designed for students who have already earned a J.D. and who wish to pursue extended legal scholarship.

Academic degrees for non-lawyers are available at the baccalaureate and master's level. A common baccalaureate level degree is a Bachelor of Science in Legal Studies (B.S.). Academic master's degrees in legal studies are available, such as the Master of Studies (M.S.), and the Master of Professional Studies (M.P.S.).

Foreign lawyers seeking to practice in the U.S., who do not have a Juris Doctor (J.D.), often seek to obtain a Juris Master (J.M.), Master of Laws (LL.M.), Master of Comparative Law (M.C.L.), or a Master of Jurisprudence (M.J.).

== Admission to the bar ==
Please see Admission to the bar in the United States. Depending upon their state, attorneys must also satisfy Continuing Legal Education (CLE) credit requirements.

== Lawyer credentials, prestige, and career path ==
American law firms are often very credential-oriented. Apart from the minimum requirements of a J.D. and admission to the state bar, there are certain credentials recognized within the profession to distinguish lawyers from one another; those credentials are almost always mentioned in lawyer profiles and biographies, which are used to communicate to both fellow attorneys and prospective clients. Chief among them are such honors as being a member of their law school's law review, moot court, or mock trial programs. Judicial clerkships after graduation or law clerk positions at prestigious law firms while in school are also distinguishing marks.

This credential-based system is sown in law school, where high grades are frequently rewarded with law review membership and much sought after summer clerkships (called "summer associateships" in some areas) with large private law firms. These programs are designed to give a firm's summer associates an idea of what the everyday practice of law is like at that particular firm by allowing them to work with the firm's partners and associates on real projects involving real clients. In larger cities, such as New York or Chicago, summer associates at large firms can make as much as $3,000 per week.

Competition to receive a summer offer from a firm is intense, and credentials (a student's GPA and class rank, law review or moot court membership, publications, etc.) play a decisive role in determining who is selected. Most offers are received after a three-step interview process. First, during the early fall of their 2L (second year), students at each law school first submit their resumes to a central paper file or online database (such as CRIS or LexisNexis Martindale-Hubbell), from which interviewers selected candidates they wish to interview, based almost entirely on their 1L GPA and class rank. Second, selected students are notified, usually via email, and then schedule a screening interview, either at the law school or at a local hotel; this interview is usually conducted by one or more attorneys from that firm and is part of most schools' On Campus Interview ("OCI") program, in which firms send recruiters to schools across the country. Finally, students selected from the screening interviews are invited for a final "callback" interview, commonly held at the firm's offices. If the selected student attends school in a place far from the city in which the firm is located, it is not unusual for the firm to fly the student in and pay for accommodations while they are in town. After the callback, a selected candidate will receive a phone call (usually within 48 hours) informing them that they have been extended an offer. After the summer, early into their 3L (third) years, the vast majority of summer associates receive formal offers to join the firm after graduating school and sitting for the bar exam.

=== Law school rankings ===
U.S. News & World Report publishes the most well-known annual ranking of American programs, where Yale Law School has held the #1 spot every year since the inception of the ranking reports until 2026. A number of alternative rankings exist, such as the Leiter Reports Law School Rankings. These rankings divide law schools into "tiers" based on the overall quality of each program. A number of factors and statistics are compiled to produce these rankings each year, including academic reputation, the quality of the faculty (usually measured by the quality of its publications), the quality of the student body (usually measured by average Law School Admission Test, or LSAT, score and undergraduate grade point average), the number of volumes in the library, the earnings potential of graduates, bar passage rates, and job placement rates. Most of these measurements are acquired by voluntary self-reporting from each law program; others are compiled through a formal process of polling judges, legal professionals, recent graduates, law professors, and school administrators. The issuance of press releases that dismiss the rankings has become a yearly ritual for many law programs, but all but a handful cooperate in gathering and reporting statistics to the various ranking publications.

==== First tier ====
There are approximately 200 ABA approved law schools in the United States. There is no universally accepted ranking system, but many have attempted to divide law schools into "tiers" consisting of quartiles (50 law schools each) or perhaps eighths (25 law schools each), or have separated out the top 10 or top 20 law schools by U.S. News rank or median LSAT score. After the JD, a large study of law graduates who passed the bar examination (but were not necessarily practicing law), found that graduates of the top 10 law schools by median LSAT score of incoming classes typically earned incomes exceeding $170,000 within 12 years after graduation. Graduates of the next 10 law schools earned around $158,000, and graduates of schools ranked 21-50 typically earned more than $130,000. Another peer reviewed study found that Law graduates at the 75th percentile of earnings ability typically earned around $80,000 more every year than they would have earned with only a bachelor's degree. Law graduate earnings typically continue to grow and do not peak until their mid 50s; thus graduates of top tier law schools can likely peak at incomes exceeding $250,000 per year.

Though the specific rankings change from year to year, the overall composition of the top schools has remained fairly constant. Most legal professionals (judges, practitioners, or professors) rank the University of Chicago, Columbia, Harvard, NYU, Stanford, and Yale in the top echelon of American law schools, with Yale Law School, Harvard Law School, and Stanford Law School being considered the most prestigious and the most selective schools to gain admission as measured by reputation scores from U.S. News surveys and admissions rate. In recent years, many people have used the concept of the T14 (the top 14) to define the top tier of law schools. These schools have consistently ranked in the top 14 in the annual US News ranking of law schools. The T14 is composed of the schools listed above and also Berkeley (Boalt Hall), Cornell, Duke, Georgetown, Michigan, Northwestern, University of Pennsylvania, and Virginia. The most prestigious and sought-after law jobs in the country—U.S. Supreme Court Clerks, legal faculty, Bristow Fellows, Office of Legal Counsel Lawyers, Assistant U.S. Attorneys in cities like New York and Chicago—are more likely to be awarded to students and graduates in one of these programs. Recruiters from elite law firms visit top-tier law schools each fall to recruit new associates for the following summer. In contrast, small and mid-market law firms — which make up the bulk of law firms in the U.S. — cannot predict their labor needs that far in advance, and most new law school graduates who do not graduate from top tier law schools therefore must seek out jobs at law firms during their third year or even after graduation.

==== Lower tiers ====
The majority of law school students do not end up at an elite university, but many can, and often do, find well-paying jobs in law firms, government, or business positions. After the JD, a large study of law graduates who passed the bar examination (but were not necessarily practicing law), found that even graduates of lower ranked law schools were typically making six figure ($100,000+) incomes within 12 years after graduation., although graduates of higher ranking schools typically earned more. The Economic Value of a Law Degree, a peer reviewed study which included law graduates who do not pass the bar exam, found that law graduates at the 25th percentile of earnings ability typically earned around $20,000 more every year than they would have earned with only a bachelor's degree, compared to around $80,000 more per year for those at the 75th percentile.

=== Regional tiers ===
Most law schools outside the top tier are more regional in scope and often have very strong regional connections to these post-graduation opportunities. For example, a student graduating from a lower-tier law school may find opportunities in that school's "home market": the legal market containing many of that school's alumni, where most of the school's networking and career development energies are focused. In contrast, an upper-tier law school may be limited in terms of employment opportunities to the broad geographic region that the law school feeds.

=== State accredited schools ===
Some schools are accredited by state governments. They are located in Alabama, California, Massachusetts, and Tennessee. Some state authorized law schools are maintained to offer a non-ABA option eliminating costly ABA requirements seen as unnecessary by many of these states.

==== Unaccredited schools ====
Many schools are not accredited by a state or the American Bar Association. Most are located in California. While graduates of these schools may apply for admission to the California State Bar, they may not necessarily be allowed to apply for admission in other states.

=== Law school activities and honors ===
Within each U.S. law school, students may receive additional credentials. These include:

- Law review/Law journal membership or editorial position (based either on grades or write-on competition or both). This is important for at least three reasons. First, because membership is determined by either grades or writing ability, it is an indicator of strong academic performance. This leads to the second reason: potential employers sometimes use law review membership in their hiring criteria. Third, work on law review exposes a student to legal scholarship and editing, and often allows the student to publish a significant piece of legal scholarship on his or her own. Most law schools have a "flagship" journal usually called "School name Law Review" (e.g., the Harvard Law Review) or "School name Law Journal" (e.g., the Yale Law Journal) that publishes articles on all areas of law, and one or more other specialty law journals that publish articles concerning only a particular area of the law (for example, the Harvard Journal of Law & Technology).
- Moot court membership or award (based on oral and written argument). Success in moot court can distinguish one as an outstanding oral advocate or appellate brief writer and can provide a degree of practical legal training often absent from law review membership. Membership in moot court and related activities, such as Dispute Resolution, may appeal especially to employers hiring for specialized litigation positions.
- Mock trial/trial advocacy membership or award, based on oral advocacy in mock trial competitions. Mock trial honors often have special appeal to litigation-oriented offices, such as a district attorney's office, attorney general's office, public defender's office, or private firms that specializes in trial litigation. Mock trial is especially useful at assisting students with public speaking, allowing them to master the rules of evidence, and gain experience in writing opening statements, direct examination, cross examinations, and closing statements.
- Order of the Coif membership (based on grade point average). This is often coupled with Latin honors (summa and magna cum laude, though often not cum laude). A slight majority of law schools in the United States do not have Order of the Coif chapters.

==== Court clerkships ====
On the basis of these credentials, as well as favorable faculty recommendations and other connections, some students become law clerks with judges after graduation, signing on for one or two-year clerkships. Clerkships may be with state or federal judges. There is a generally recognized hierarchy with regard to clerkships (federal clerkships are considered more prestigious than state court clerkships, and appellate court clerkships are considered more prestigious than trial court clerkships, with United States Supreme Court clerkships considered the most prestigious).

Lawyers benefit from clerkships by gaining experience working for a judge. Often, clerks engage in significant legal research and writing for the judge, writing memos to assist a judge in coming to a legal conclusion in some cases, and writing drafts of opinions based on the judge's decisions. Appellate court clerkships, although generally more prestigious, do not necessarily offer a great deal of practical experience in the day-to-day life of a lawyer in private practice. The average litigator might gain more relevant experience out of a clerkship at the trial court level, where they will be learning about motions practices, dealing with lawyers, and generally learning how a trial court works on the inside.

By and large, though, clerkships provide other valuable assets to a new lawyer. Judges often become mentors to their clerks, providing the attorney with someone whom they can go for advice. Fellow clerks can also become professional connections.

Hierarchies aside, clerkships are considered to be a knowledgeable experience for the new lawyers, and law schools encourage graduates to engage in a clerkship to broaden their professional experiences.

==== United States Supreme Court clerkships ====
Each justice on the Supreme Court will typically hire 4 clerks per year. Almost without exception, these clerks are graduates of elite law schools (with Harvard, Yale, and the University of Chicago being the most highly represented schools) who have already clerked for at least one year with highly selective federal circuit court judges.

== Criticism ==
Law school normally consists of only a classroom setting, unlike training in other professions. (For example, medical school in the United States is traditionally two years of class environment and two years of "rotations", or an apprenticeship-type hands-on experience.) Although some countries such as Germany and France require apprenticeship with a practicing attorney, this is not required in any United States jurisdiction. Because of this, many law students graduate with a grasp of the legal doctrines necessary to pass the bar exam, but with no actual hands-on experience or knowledge of the day-to-day practice of law. The American Bar Association called for American law schools to move towards a practice-based approach in the MacCrate Report.

Many law schools have started to supplement classroom education with practical experience. Externship programs allow students to receive academic credit for unpaid work with a judge, government agency, or community legal services office. Several law schools also have law clinic programs in which students counsel actual clients under the supervision of a professor, such as University of Massachusetts School of Law and Cardozo School of Law. City University of New York School of Law and Florida Coastal School of Law are some of the few law schools that require student participation in law clinic courses. Similarly, Northeastern University School of Law uses cooperative education to give its students law office work experience prior to graduation, as did the now-defunct Savannah Law School. Washington and Lee University School of Law has completely re-vamped its curriculum to require students to take practicum courses, externships, and clinics in the final year of law school to provide experience in preparation for practice.

=== Other issues ===
Large scale representative studies find that the overwhelming majority of lawyers are satisfied with their careers and their decisions to attend law school. Based on anecdotal evidence, some have claimed that high level of stress, a "culture of hours" and ethical issues common in the legal profession lead to a lower level of job satisfaction relative to many other careers. See, for example, "Money and Ethics: The Young Lawyer's Conundrum", by Patrick J. Schiltz, January 2000 Washington State Bar News

== See also ==
- Law school
- Correspondence law school
- Law school in the United States
- Law school rankings in the United States
- Law School Admission Test
- Civic education in the United States
- Legal awareness
- Paralegal § Education, training, and certification
- Reading law
