= Max Hardberger =

American lawyer, adventurer, and author (born 1948)

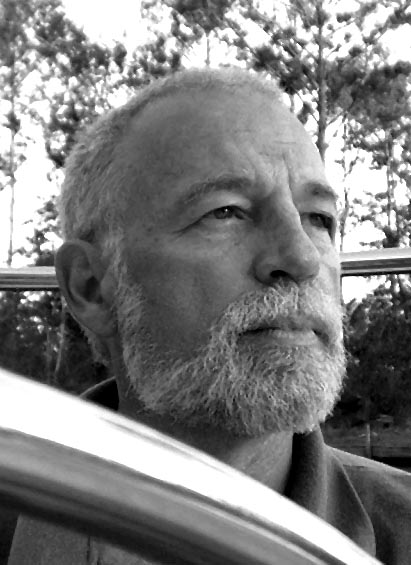
- Max Hardberger
- Born: Florian Max Hardberger; November 19, 1948 (age 77); Baton Rouge, Louisiana, US
- Education: Nicholls State University; University of New Orleans (BA); University of Iowa (MFA); Northwestern California University School of Law (JD)
- Occupations: Novelist; ship captain; ship recovery specialist; maritime lawyer
- Writing career
- Genres: Sea stories; adventure; hardboiled; crime fiction
- Website: maxhardberger.com

Florian Max Hardberger (born November 19, 1948) is an American adventurer, ship captain, aviator, ship recovery specialist, admiralty lawyer, and author of maritime fiction and nonfiction adventures.

== Education ==
Hardberger received his high school degree in 1966 from the Castle Heights Military Academy in Lebanon, Tennessee. He became a licensed aircraft pilot at the age of 16 while at Castle Heights. Hardberger attended college at Nicholls State University in Thibodaux, Louisiana, then transferred to the University of New Orleans for another two years of study. In 1969, he graduated early with a BA in English. During college, Hardberger became a scuba diver, sailor, and navigator. After college, he took creative writing at the University of Iowa (commonly known as the "Iowa Writers' Workshop"), where in 1972, he received an MFA in Fiction and Poetry. In 1998, Hardberger earned a Juris Doctor degree from Northwestern California University School of Law in Sacramento, California, and was admitted to the State Bar of California.

== Professional career ==
=== Teaching English and playing music: 1969–1976 ===
After college, Hardberger started his professional career with a short stint teaching English at Mandeville High School in Louisiana. He then worked as a newspaper reporter for the Houma Daily Guide in Houma, Louisiana. He left the newspaper to explore Mexico in an old school bus before returning to the United States to attend graduate school. After he received his MFA degree in 1972, Hardberger taught English at All Saints Episcopal School in Vicksburg, Mississippi. He left teaching to work as a drummer in various blues bands on the Chitlin Circuit.

=== Oilfield worker and pilot: 1977–1985 ===
In 1977, Hardberger returned to Louisiana to work as a deckhand and then as a mate on the oilfield supply vessel Magcobar Mercury, in the Gulf of Mexico. After he earned a captain's license, Hardberger's employer sent him to the Dresser-Magcobar Drilling Fluids School in Houston to learn how to become a drilling fluids engineer. Hardberger initially worked in oilfields off the Louisiana and Mississippi Gulf Coast and then worked as a drilling fluids consultant in Guatemala during the civil war. Between oilfield hitches, Hardberger continued his flying lessons, earning commercial and flight instructor licenses, and took a wide variety of flying jobs, including towing banners, dusting crops, doing nightly check runs for banks, and transporting dead bodies for mortuaries.

Hardberger returned to the classroom for the 1984–85 school year, when he taught English and world history at Pope John Paul II High School (Slidell, Louisiana). He briefly returned to the oilfields of Guatemala in 1985, then began crop dusting on a full-time basis in Breaux Bridge, Louisiana. At the end of the 1986 crop dusting season, Hardberger traveled to Miami to search for new work.

=== Ship captain: 1986–1990 ===
When Jean-Claude "Baby Doc" Duvalier was overthrown as the ruler of Haiti in 1986, trade opened up between the Caribbean nation and the United States. After Hardberger left crop dusting, he found work on the Miami River as the captain of a small freighter. Among his commands was the Erika, a small freighter that transported cargo throughout the Caribbean. Hardberger's voyages on the Erika were the basis of his 1998 semi-autobiographical novel, Freighter Captain.

=== Recovering vessels: 1990–present ===
Hardberger left the Erika to work for a Miami-based ship owner, MorganPrice & Co., as port captain responsible for overseeing port calls by the company's ships. During this period, a MorganPrice freighter, the Patric M, was seized by a shipper in Puerto Cabello, Venezuela. This required Hardberger to sail the vessel out of port under the cover of night and without clearance, in violation of Venezuelan law. The operation was Hardberger's first vessel "extraction" and is detailed in his autobiography, Seized.

Hardberger left MorganPrice in 1990 to form his own marine consultancy business in Louisiana. He was periodically retained by shipowners to extract their vessels from lawless ports without clearance from local authorities. In 1998, following his admission to the California Bar, Hardberger began to practice maritime law alongside his marine consultancy and vessel extraction business. In 2002, he formed the ship repossession company Vessel Extractions, LLC ("VessEx") to extract vessels illegitimately detained or seized in foreign countries. In 2004, Hardberger was featured in the Learning Channel series Repo Men: Stealing for a Living, in a segment titled "Repo Adventurer", documenting his extraction of a 10,000-ton freighter from Haiti during the 2004 rebellion and his delivery of the vessel to her mortgagee in the Bahamas.

== Writing ==
Hardberger's first book was Deadweight: Owning the Ocean Freighter (1994), a textbook on ship ownership. He followed Deadweight with his first novel, Freighter Captain (1998), a semi-autobiographical account of his adventures as a ship captain in the Caribbean. Hardberger then moved from maritime subjects to a murder mystery with his 1999 novel, The Jumping-Off Place, which was a tribute to the hardboiled detective novels of Raymond Chandler and Dashiell Hammett. On April 6, 2010, Hardberger's autobiography about his ship recovery adventures, titled Seized! A Sea Captain's Adventures Battling Scoundrels and Pirates While Recovering Stolen Ships in the World's Most Troubled Waters, was published by the Broadway Books imprint of Random House.
