= Kathleen Martinez (TikToker) =

American lawyer and TikToker

- Born: Oregon, U.S.
- Education: Mount Saint Mary's University; Thomas Jefferson School of Law (JD)
- Occupations: Attorney; TikToker
- Political party: Democratic
- Spouse: Alejandro Martinez
- Children: 2

TikTok information
- Page: attorneymartinez
- Followers: 2.4 M
- Last updated: August 23, 2026
- Website: martinezimmigration.net

Kathleen Martinez is an American lawyer and social media personality. She is the founder and managing attorney at the immigration law firm Martinez Immigration.

== Early life and education ==
Martinez was born in Oregon. She briefly attended Oregon State University before transferring to Mount Saint Mary's University in Los Angeles, where she was a pre-law student. She earned a Juris Doctor degree from Thomas Jefferson School of Law in San Diego.

== Career ==
Martinez makes legal and political content on TikTok. In 2022, she went viral across social media platforms for opening up about her "all-pink" law firm, Martinez Immigration, after being fired by her male employer at another firm. Buzzfeed compared Martinez to the character Elle Woods from the film Legally Blonde. She is known for her pink-colored outfits. She has also been compared to in Barbie in the press.

Martinez is licensed to practice law in the state of Texas. She founded her firm in 2022. She has clients in Texas, California, Arizona, Colorado, Florida, Maryland, Georgia, Michigan, New York, and Oregon.

== Personal life ==
She is married to Alejandro Martinez, a Mexican immigrant to the US who is the CEO of Martinez Immigration. They have two children.
