= Thomas Jefferson School of Law =

Law school in San Diego, California, US

- Established: 1969
- School type: Private law school
- Dean: Dawn Dekle
- Location: San Diego, California, United States
- Enrollment: 264 (2022)
- Faculty: 68 (12 Full-time and 56 Part-time)
- Bar pass rate: 4% (July 2023 first-time bar takers)
- Website: www.tjsl.edu

The Thomas Jefferson School of Law (TJSL) is a private law school in San Diego, California. It offers a Juris Doctor and two Master of Laws programs.

The school is not accredited by the American Bar Association (ABA), following the ABA's withdrawal of approval in December 2019. However, it is approved by the California State Bar's Committee of Bar Examiners.

== History ==
The Thomas Jefferson School of Law was founded in 1969 as the San Diego campus of the Western State University College of Law and operated as such until 1995, when it became independent. It joined the Association of American Law Schools in 2008. In January 2011, TJSL moved to a new, 305,000-square-foot (28,300 m^{2}) building located in the East Village district of downtown San Diego. In 2018, the school announced it would vacate its building as a cost-cutting measure, moving into an office building in downtown San Diego.

== Accreditation ==
TJSL received accreditation from the American Bar Association (ABA) in 1996. The ABA revoked the school's accreditation on June 10, 2019. This followed a public censure by the ABA in 2018 and a 2017 decision to place the school on probation for being out of compliance with the ABA requirement that schools admit only students who appear capable of earning a J.D. degree and passing the bar examination. In October 2018, TJSL became a California state approved school, allowing its students to take the California Bar Exam.

== Academics ==
The program offers two Master of Laws (LL.M.) and a JSD "Doctor of Laws or Juridical Science" degree. The J.D. program is offered in person as well as online. Certificate Programs in International Financial Centers, United States Taxation, E-commerce, Anti-Money Laundering & Compliance, and Trusts and Estate Planning are available. Faculty for the program are generally part-time and populated with industry professionals. Students begin classes in August, attend the three-year, full-time program or the four-year, part-time program, and can accelerate graduation one semester by taking additional classes during the summer. Day and evening classes are offered.

== Bar pass rate ==
The October 2020 California Bar pass rate for TJSL graduates was 47% for first time takers and 44% for repeat takers, vs. statewide averages of 74% and 43%, respectively. The July 2021 California Bar pass rate for TJSL graduates was 52% for first time takers and 18% for repeat takers, vs. statewide averages of 71% and 19%, respectively. For the July 2023 California Bar, the pass rate for TJSL graduates was 4% for first-time takers and 20% for repeat takers versus statewide averages of 64% and 24%, respectively.

== Costs and student debt ==
The total cost of attendance (indicating the cost of tuition, fees, and living expenses) at the Thomas Jefferson School of Law for the 2018–2019 academic year is $77,660. Law School Transparency estimated debt-financed cost of attendance for three years at $297,652.

According to U.S. News & World Report, the average indebtedness of 2018 graduates who incurred law school debt was $196,607 (not including undergraduate debt), and 92% of 2018 graduates took on debt. The average indebtedness of graduates who incurred law school debt is second-highest among US law schools. The school's Associate Dean for Student Affairs has attributed the average debt level to the school's admittance of immigrants and those who are the first in their family to attend law school—people who are statistically more likely to lack individual or family resources.

== Post-graduation employment ==
ABA Employment Summary for 2018 Graduates
Employment Status	Percentage
Employed—Bar Passage Required (Full-Time, Long-Term)	19.4%
Employed—Bar Passage Required (Part-Time and/or Short-Term)	3.5%
Employed—J.D. Advantage	16.7%
Employed—Professional Position	11.1%
Pursuing Graduate Degree Full Time	2.8%
Unemployed—Not Seeking	4.9%
Unemployed—Seeking	21.5%
Employment Status Unknown	20.1%
Total of 144 Graduates

According to Thomas Jefferson School of Law's official 2018 ABA-required disclosures, 19% of the Class of 2018 obtained full-time, long-term, JD-required employment nine months after graduation.

In 2013, The National Law Journal reported TJSL had the highest unemployment rate after graduation (31.5%) amongst all law schools in the US.

In January 2011, a New York Times article about the inability of many recent law school graduates to get jobs discussed Thomas Jefferson's claim that 92% of the class of 2009 was employed within nine months of graduation. The school's claim was based on a survey of the class of 2009. (Under ABA rules, 25% of graduates who do not participate in employment surveys are counted as employed.) The Wall Street Journal also ran a story in June 2012 listing TJSL as one of the 'bottom five' schools for 2011 graduate employment.

In May 2011, Anna Alaburda filed a class-action lawsuit against TJSL, alleging that the school had committed fraud by publishing deceptive post-graduation employment statistics and salary data in order to bait new students into enrolling. Alaburda, a 2008 honors graduate, claimed that despite graduating at the top of her class and passing the California bar exam, she was unable to find suitable legal employment, and had incurred more than $150,000 in student loan debt. This is the first time a law school would stand trial for allegedly inflating its employment statistics. The jury found in favor of TJSL with a 9–3 verdict.

== Center for Solo Practitioners ==
Since autumn 2012, TJSL has operated Center for Solo Practitioners, a lawyer incubator program that provides space and support for selected alumni who are going into solo practice. It is also intended to help serve under-represented communities.

At the 2013 annual meeting of the American Bar Association, the Center for Solo Practitioners was honored with an ABA award in recognition of "successful implementation of a project or program specifically targeted to solo and small-firm lawyers."

== Additional programs offered ==
=== Intellectual property ===
In 2009, TJSL initiated an Intellectual Property Fellowship Program for students with undergraduate or advanced degrees in the hard sciences or engineering. The TJSL Center for Law and Intellectual Property has course offerings in copyright, patent, trademark and unfair competition law as well as cyberspace law, biotechnology law and bioethics, telecommunications and media law, and sports and entertainment law.

=== International law ===
The Center for Global Legal Studies offers a specialized program in international law.

=== Social Justice Center ===
The Center for Law and Social Justice is a research and teaching program in areas of public policy and law in its field.

== Notable people ==
=== Alumni ===
- Roger Benitez (1978), federal judge of the U.S. District Court of the Southern District of California
- Bonnie Dumanis (1976), first openly gay or lesbian district attorney in the US and the first Jewish woman DA in San Diego
- Michael Dvorak (1975), former Indiana State Representative and St. Joseph County, Indiana prosecutor
- Duncan Hunter (1976), Republican member of the House of Representatives from California's 52nd, 45th and 42nd districts from 1981 to 2009 and 2008 Presidential candidate
- Jessica King (2001), Wisconsin professor and former Wisconsin state senator
- Leslie Alexander, former stock trader and former owner of the National Basketball Association (NBA) team Houston Rockets
- Kathleen Martinez, immigration lawyer and social media personality
- Tim Purpura (1992), former general manager of the Houston Astros baseball team
- Sherrexcia "Rexy" Rolle (2014), Bahamian attorney, singer and VP of Operations & General Counsel of Western Air

=== Faculty ===
- Marjorie Cohn, former president of the National Lawyers Guild and author

== See also ==
- Law school rankings in the United States
- List of law school GPA curves
