= Civic education in the United States =

Civic education is a subject taught in schools in the United States.

== Rationale ==
The promotion of a republic and its values has been an important concern for policy-makers – to impact people's political perceptions, to encourage political participation, and to foster the principles enshrined in the Constitution (e.g. liberty, freedom of speech, civil rights). The subject of "Civics" has been integrated into the Curriculum and Content Standards, to enhance the comprehension of democratic values in the educational system. Civic literature has found that "engaging young children in civic activities from an early age is a positive predictor of their participation in later civic life".

As an academic subject, Civics has the instructional objective to promote knowledge that is aligned with self-governance and participation in matters of public concern. These objectives advocate for an instruction that encourages active student participation in democratic decision-making environments, such as voting to elect a course representative for a school government, or deciding on actions that will affect the school environment or community. Thus the intersection of individual and collective decision making activities, are critical to shape "individual's moral development". To reach those goals, civic instructors must promote the adoption of certain skills and attitudes such as "respectful argumentation, debate, information literacy", to support "the development of morally responsible individuals who will shape a morally responsible and civically minded society". In the 21st century, young people are less interested in direct political participation (i.e. being in a political party or even voting), but are motivated to use digital media (e.g. Twitter, Facebook). Digital media enable young people to share and exchange ideas rapidly, enabling the coordination of local communities that promote volunteerism and political activism, in topics principally related to human rights and environmental subjects.

Young people are constructing and supporting their political identities in the 21st century by using social media, and digital tools (e.g. text messaging, hashtags, videos) to share, post, reply an opinion or attitude about a political/social topic and to promote social mobilization and support through online mechanism to a wide and diverse audience. Therefore, civics' end-goal in the 21st century must be oriented to "empower the learners to find issues in their immediate communities that seem important to the people with whom they live and associate", once "learners have identified with a personal issue and participated in constructing a collective framing for common issues".

== Current state ==
According to the No Child Left Behind Act of 2001, one of the purposes of Civic Education is to "foster civic competence and responsibility" which is promoted through the Center for Civic Education’s We the People and Project Citizen initiatives. However, there is a lack of consensus for how this mission should be pursued. The Center for Information & Research on Civic Learning & Engagement (CIRCLE) reviewed state civic education requirements in the United States for 2012. The findings include:

- All 50 states have social studies standards which include civics and government.
- 39 states require at least one course in government/civics. (Note: The CIRCLE Fact Sheet excludes Illinois in this total since it "requires students to take US History or US History & Civics".)
- 21 states require a state-mandated social studies test which is a decrease from 2001 (34 states).
- 8 states require students to take a state-mandated government/civics test.
- 9 states require a social studies test as a requirement for high school graduation.

The lack of state-mandated student accountability relating to civics may be a result of a shift in emphasis towards reading and mathematics in response to the 2001 No Child Left Behind Act. There is a movement to require that states utilize the citizenship test as a graduation requirement, but this is seen as a controversial solution to some educators.

Students are also demonstrating that their civic knowledge leaves much to be desired. A National Center for Education Statistics NAEP report card for civics (2010) stated that "levels of civic knowledge in U.S. have remained unchanged or even declined over the past century". Specifically, only 24 percent of 4th, 8th, and 12th graders were at or above the proficient level on the National Assessment of Educational Progress in civics. Traditionally, civic education has emphasized the facts of government processes detached from participatory experience. In an effort to combat the existing approach, the National Council for the Social Studies developed the College, Career, and Civic Life (C3) Framework for Social Studies State Standards. The C3 Framework emphasizes "new and active approaches" including the "discussion of controversial issues and current events, deliberation of public issues, service-learning, action civics, participation in simulation and role play, and the use of digital technologies".

== In the 21st century ==
According to a 2007 study conducted by the Pew Research Center, among teens 12–17 years old, 95% have access to the Internet, 70% go online daily, 80% use social networking sites, and 77% have cell phones. As a result, participatory culture has become a staple for today’s youth, affecting their conceptualization of civic participation. They use Web 2.0 tools (i.e. blogs, podcasts, wikis, social media) to: circulate information (blogs and podcasts); collaborate with peers (wikis); produce and exchange media; and connect with people around the world via social media and online communities. The pervasiveness of participatory digital tools has led to a shift in the way adolescents today perceive civic action and participation. Whereas 20th century civic education embraced the belief of "dutiful citizenship" and civic engagement as a "matter of duty or obligation;" 21st century civic education has shifted to reflect youths' "personally expressive politics" and "peer-to-peer relationships" that promote civic engagement.

This shift in students' perceptions has led to classroom civic education experiences that reflect the digital world in which 21st century youth now live, in order to make the content both relevant and meaningful. Civics education classrooms in the 21st century now seek to provide genuine opportunities to actively engage in the consumption, circulation, discussion, and production of civic and political content via Web 2.0 technologies such as blogging, wikis, and social media. Although these tools offer new ways for engagement, interaction, and dialogue, educators have also recognized the need to teach youth how to interact both respectfully and productively with their peers and members of online communities. As a result, many school districts have also begun adopting Media Literacy Frameworks for Engaged Citizenship as a pedagogical approach to prepare students for active participatory citizenship in today’s digital age. This model includes critical analysis of digital media as well as a deep understanding of media literacy as a "collaborative and participatory movement that aims to empower individuals to have a voice and to use it."

== See also ==
- Citizenship education (subject)
- Civics
- Legal education in the United States
