= Marjorie Cohn =

American lawyer

- Born: November 1, 1948 (age 77)

Academic background
- Education: Stanford University (BA); Santa Clara University (JD)

Academic work
- Discipline: Law
- Sub-discipline: Criminal law · criminal procedure · international human rights law
- Institutions: Thomas Jefferson School of Law

Marjorie Cohn (born November 1, 1948) is an American legal scholar working as a professor of law at the Thomas Jefferson School of Law in San Diego. She is also a former president of the National Lawyers Guild.

== Education ==
Cohn earned a Bachelor of Arts degree from Stanford University and a Juris Doctor from the Santa Clara University School of Law.

== Career ==
In 1978, Cohn received a job in the International Association of Democratic Lawyers. She also "participated in delegations to Cuba, China, Russia, and Yugoslavia" and served as staff counsel for the California Agricultural Labor Relations Board.

Cohn strongly opposed the "U.S.-engineered deportation" of Serbian leader Slobodan Milošević to the International Criminal Tribunal for the former Yugoslavia for crimes against humanity committed in Yugoslavia. She accused the West of targeting Serbian civilians and stated the deportation to the Tribunal was "a crime against the people of Yugoslavia".

Cohn has contributed online commentary criticizing the former Bush administration to web sites such as MWC News, AlterNet, CounterPunch, Common Dreams, After Downing Street, ZNetwork, and Truthdig. She also states that she has been a commentator for the BBC, CNN, MSNBC, Fox News, NPR, and Pacifica Radio.

In mid-2008, Cohn testified before the United States House Committee on the Judiciary's Subcommittee on the Constitution, Civil Rights and Civil Liberties concerning enhanced interrogation techniques and their legal status.

== Awards ==
Cohn has received the following awards:

- 2005: Service to Legal Education Award by the San Diego County Bar Association.
- 2007: Bernard E. Witkin, Esq. Award for Excellence in the Teaching of Law by the San Diego Law Library Justice Foundation.

== Bibliography ==
Cohn has authored or co-authored books, including:

- Cohn, Marjorie (2007). Cowboy Republic: Six Ways the Bush Gang Has Defied the Law. Polipoint Press. ISBN 978-0-9778253-3-2.
- Cohn, Marjorie; Gilberd, Kathleen (2009). Rules of Disengagement: The Politics and Honor of Military Dissent. Polipoint Press. ISBN 978-0-9815769-2-3.
