= Humphreys University =

- Type: Private
- Established: 1896
- President: Robert G. Humphreys, Jr.
- Faculty: 100
- Administrative staff: 60
- Undergraduates: 900
- Location: Stockton (main campus) and Modesto, California, California, USA; 38°00′41″N 121°19′00″W
- Colors: Gold and purple
- Website: www.humphreys.edu

Humphreys University, previously known as Humphreys College, is an independent, non-profit university with two campuses in California, one in Modesto and the other in Stockton. It has been in continuous service to the central San Joaquin Valley since 1896, giving it the distinction of being the first institution of higher education in the area. It awards certificates, and associate's, bachelor's, and master's degrees. Its Humphreys College Laurence Drivon School of Law awards the juris doctor degree. The college is accredited by the Western Association of Schools and Colleges and the Accrediting Commission for Senior Colleges and Universities, and the law school is approved by the California State Bar Committee of Bar Examiners.

== History ==
Although records show the existence of the school in Stockton going as far back as 1875, Humphreys College dates its founding to 1896 when John R. Humphreys, Sr. took over the administration of the Stockton Business College, Normal School, and Telegraphic Institute. When Humphreys died in 1937, his son, John R. Humphreys, Jr. took over the operation of the school.

The name of the school changed several times, at one point known as the "Gas City Business College" before being taken over in 1901 by the "Western School of Commerce", which merged with "Heald's Business College" in 1920 to become the "Stockton College of Commerce"; however, in 1947, the school incorporated as a non-profit institution of higher learning with the state of California, and took the name that it is known by today.

Humphreys' main campus in Stockton is located in the North Stockton neighborhood of Sherwood adjacent to Stockton's Lincoln Center shopping area, moving from a downtown location after construction of the facility completed in 1967. In 1987 a new campus was established in Modesto in conjunction with and on the Modesto Junior College campus, later becoming a separate campus at its current location.

A Sacramento-area campus opened in 1990, assuming the operation (but not the business) of two closing court reporting colleges, Unilex College and Careercom College of Business; however, under economic pressure of the early 2000s recession and dwindling enrollment this campus closed in 2001.

A partnership with the Stockton Unified School District in 2005 produced the Institute of Business Management and Law, a charter high school located in the west campus building complex, graduating its final class in 2011 followed by the subsequent dissolution of the partnership. Also, in 2005, the main campus in Stockton was re-dedicated to the community and underwent a remodel along with a 22,000 sq ft (2,000 m^{2}) campus expansion, which included new undergraduate and law libraries, faculty and administrative offices, law school building and the Carcione Courtroom, dedicated to the late Joseph Carcione, Sr. by his son, local Stockton attorney Joseph W. Carcione, Jr.

In January 2009, after receiving a substantive change approval from the Western Association of Schools and Colleges, the college began offering a new graduate program, the Master of Arts in Education with emphases in Early Childhood Education and Educational Administration. In late 2009, with continued increases in enrollment, the college created plans to demolish the former student housing and childcare buildings and expand another 14,000 sq ft (1,300 m^{2}), spreading the campus south to Quincy Street with additional parking, classrooms and community space; construction began in March 2010 and was completed in February 2011. The Modesto campus also doubled in capacity during 2010, using adjoining facilities vacated by the departure of the University of Phoenix as enrollment tripled from an all-time low from the 2007 academic year.

With the Stockton Unified School District partnership dissolution, a new charter high school was proposed using the existing facilities of the former Institute of Business Management and Law, with an expected September 2011 opening date. The proposal was unanimously rejected by the Lincoln Unified School District in a public board meeting, then subsequently accepted by New Jerusalem School District under its Delta Charter, thus enabling the Academy of Business, Law and Education to open as planned.

In September 2013, the college lost eligibility to participate in California state financial aid due to its student loan default rate exceeding the federal standard.

Following several quarters of declining enrollment, an exodus of transfer students, and the prior loss of state financial aid, by 2014, the college embarked on a cost-reduction course of action, reducing 25% of employees via attrition, pay-cuts, layoffs and retirement offers – including the serving president, who agreed to step down by the end of the next academic year with his heir accepting the familial role with the uncontested and unanimous approval of the board of trustees.

== Presidents ==
- John R. Humphreys, Sr. 1896–1937
- John R. Humphreys, Jr. 1937–1980
- Robert G. Humphreys, Sr. 1980–2014
- Robert G. Humphreys, Jr. 2014–present

== See also ==
- List of colleges and universities in California
