= California Desert Trial Academy College of Law =

Coordinates: 33.7195°N 116.2166°W

California Desert Trial Academy College of Law is an unaccredited law school located in Indio, California. It is the only law school located in the Coachella Valley.

== History ==
The school was founded in 2012. Originally, classes were held in local libraries, the Indio Performing Arts Center and a casino conference room.

Its current campus was created in 2016, and used to be a vacant furniture store. That year there were 37 students and 11 graduates.

== Leadership ==
The founder and president of the California Desert Trial Academy College of Law is John Patrick Dolan. There are 11 faculty members.

== Accreditation ==
California Desert Trial Academy College of Law is not accredited by the American Bar Association. It is registered with, though is unaccredited by the State Bar of California.
