= List of law school GPA curves =

Many, or perhaps most, law schools in the United States grade on a norm-referenced grading curve. The process generally works within each class, where the instructor grades each exam, and then ranks the exams against each other, adding to and subtracting from the initial grades so that the overall grade distribution matches the school's specified curve (usually a bell curve). "The curve" is the permitted range of each letter grade that can be awarded, for example, 0–3% A+, 3–7% A, etc. Curves vary between different law schools, as do the rules for when the curve is mandatory versus suggestive. It is common for the curve to be mandatory for first-year ("1L") courses, and for classes above a certain size.

Grading on a curve contributes to the competitive atmosphere within law schools. "The main source of this competition is the mandatory curve you will likely encounter once you enter law school. The curve affects the class rank, affects the chances of making law review, affects the chances of scoring that big job/externship." Some law schools set their curve lower to retain scholarship funding; others set their curve higher to make their students more competitive in the job market.

The following list shows where law schools set the 50% mark (also known as 50th percentile, or more colloquially: the median) for an individual class subject to the curve. Because not all classes are curved and because professors still have discretion within the curve's ranges, where a law school sets its curve is not necessarily revealing of that school's average student GPA (whether after 1L or upon graduation).

== The list ==
| Law school | GPA curve |
|---|---|
| University of Akron School of Law | 2.7 |
| University of Alabama School of Law | 3.20 |
| Albany Law School | 3.0 |
| American University Washington College of Law | No mandatory curve; 3.1 to 3.3 mean for 1L courses, except First-Year Rhetoric. 3.25 to 3.45 mean for most upper-level courses. |
| Appalachian School of Law | 2.50–2.67 |
| Atlanta's John Marshall Law School | 2.00–2.34 (1L) |
| University of Arizona, James E. Rogers College of Law | 3.33 |
| Arizona State University, Sandra Day O'Connor College of Law | 3.30 |
| University of Arkansas School of Law | 2.67 (most 1L course) 2.67 or 3.0 (in most other courses) |
| University of Arkansas at Little Rock, William H. Bowen School of Law | 2.9–3.1 |
| Ave Maria School of Law | 2.67 |
| University of Baltimore School of Law | 2.67–3.0 (1L courses), 3.0–3.5 (upper-level courses) |
| Barry University, Dwayne O. Andreas School of Law | 2.5 |
| Belmont University College of Law | 2.9-3.1 (1L), 3.0-3.2 (upper-level courses) |
| Benjamin N. Cardozo School of Law | 3.10 and 3.20 (all first-year courses) |
| Boston College Law School | 3.2 |
| Boston University School of Law | Not reported (top-third: 3.51) |
| Brigham Young University J. Reuben Clark Law School | 3.30 |
| Brooklyn Law School | 3.25 |
| Capital University Law School | 2.6 to 2.75 (first-year classes) |
| Case Western Reserve University School of Law | 3.0 (3.1 median) for 1Ls, varies from (3.2–3.67) for 2L/3Ls |
| UCI School of Law | 3.2 |
| UCLA School of Law | Maximum median 3.3 |
| UC Davis School of Law | 3.25–3.35 |
| Chapman University School of Law | 2.8 (first-year courses) 3.0 (all other courses) |
| Charleston School of Law | 2.3 to 2.7 (first-year courses) |
| Chicago-Kent College of Law | 3.0 (mandatory for all required courses except legal writing; recommended for most other courses) |
| University of Cincinnati Donald P. Klekamp College of Law | 3.0 in first-year courses; 3.3 median in most upper-division courses |
| Columbus School of Law | 3.00–3.30 (4.33 scale) |
| University of Connecticut School of Law | 3.0 median |
| Cornell Law School | 3.35 |
| University of Dayton School of Law | Beginning in the Fall of 2024, first-year courses on Grading Option A, other than Legal Profession I and II, shall be subject to the following grade distribution: 5-25% of the class shall receive A+, A, A−, or B+ grades; 35-65% of the class shall receive B, B-, C+, or C grades; 15-40% of the class shall receive C-, D+, D, or F grades. The mean GPA for the class shall not exceed 2.85. |
| University of Denver Sturm College of Law | 3.00 (median); 2.85–3.15 (mean) |
| DePaul University | 2.95–3.15 (mean for upper level classes with over 50 students and all 1L classes). For classes graded on this curve, the faculty suggests that 12%–17% of the grades be A, 20%–30% of the grades be A− and/or B+, 20%–30% of the grades be B, 20%–30% of the grades be B− and/or C+, and 10%–15% of the grades be C or below. |
| University of Detroit Mercy School of Law | University of Detroit Mercy School of Law does not have a grading curve and instead utilizes criterion referenced assessment for all courses. |
| Drexel University Drexel University Thomas R. Kline School of Law | 3.–3.10 |
| Duke University School of Law | 3.30 for 1L classes and all others with 50 or more people, 3.50 for all classes with between 10 and 49 people, and no median for classes with fewer than 10 |
| Thomas R. Kline School of Law of Duquesne University | For first-year courses: Tier 1 (A+, A, A−) between 14% and 22% of all grades, with a target of 18%; Tier 2 (B+, B, B−) between 36% and 54% of all grades, with a target of 45%; Tier 3 (C+, C, C−) between 24% and 36% of all grades, with a target of 30%; Tier 4 (D+, D, F) between 0% and 10% of all grades, with a target of 7%. Upper-level courses with 30 or more students have a slightly modified distribution. Upper-level courses with fewer than 30 students are not bound by any distribution. |
| Elon University School of Law | 2.67 or 3.00 (based on a scale where 2.8 was equivalent to C and 4.3 was highest A) |
| Emory University School of Law | 3.30 |
| Florida Coastal School of Law | 2.50 (1L mean); 2.70 (2L/3L mean) |
| University of Florida Levin College of Law | 3.25–3.35 |
| Fordham University School of Law | 3.15–3.50 |
| George Mason University School of Law | 3.00–3.20 |
| The George Washington University Law School | 3.25–3.35 (1L) 3.15–3.45 (2L–3L) |
| Georgetown University Law Center | 3.33 |
| University of Georgia School of Law | 2.90–3.20 |
| Georgia State University College of Law | 2.9–3.1 (4.3 scale) |
| Gonzaga University School of Law | 2.80–3.10 |
| Thomas Jefferson School of Law | 2.7 |
| University of Houston Law Center | 3.20–3.40 |
| University of Idaho College of Law | 2.70 |
| University of Illinois College of Law | No mandatory curve, recommend curve for 1L courses 3.2 |
| University of Kansas School of Law | 2.80–3.00 (1L mean), 2.9–3.1 (2L/3L required courses mean), 2.8–3.4 (all other mean) |
| University of Kentucky College of Law | 2.9–3.1 |
| Lewis & Clark Law School | 3.3 (1L and classes with more than 20 students); 3.5 expected maximum (all other courses) |
| Lincoln Memorial University – Duncan School of Law | 2.3–2.7 (1L) 2.6–3.0 (2L) |
| Louisiana State University, Paul M. Hebert Law Center | 3.0 median, ±.1 (1L and all classes with more than 50 students); 3.0 median and mean, ±.2 (2L/3L Classes with less than 50 but more than 20 students) |
| Loyola University New Orleans College of Law | 3.017 |
| University of Maine School of Law | 3.00–3.10 for 1L classes; 3.15–3.25 for 2L/3L classes with 16 or more students |
| University of Massachusetts School of Law | 1.9–2.3 |
| Massachusetts School of Law | 2.0 |
| University of Memphis – Cecil C. Humphreys School of Law | 2.67 |
| University of Miami School of Law | 3.2 |
| University of Michigan Law School | 3.25–3.4 |
| University of Minnesota Law School | 3.20–3.33 |
| University of Missouri-Kansas City School of Law | 2.942 (median grade – grading guidelines vary by year in school and type of course) |
| Mississippi College School of Law | 2.50–2.79(1L) |
| University of Montana Alexander Blewett III School of Law | 2.70–3.30 |
| University of Nevada, Las Vegas William S. Boyd School of Law | 3.0 |
| University of New Hampshire School of Law | 3.0 |
| University of New Mexico School of Law | None currently listed. |
| North Carolina Central University School of Law | 1.67–2.33 |
| Northwestern University School of Law | 3.45 for required 1L courses, 3.55 for elective 1L courses and upper-level doctrinal courses with enrollment over 13 students, no curve for other upper-level courses. |
| Nova Southeastern University – Shepard Broad College of Law | 2.9–3.1 |
| Ohio Northern University, Pettit College of Law | 2.33 (L1) – 2.66 (L2/L3) |
| Ohio State University Moritz College of Law | 3.30 |
| Oklahoma City University School of Law | 2.5-2.835 for "fixed required courses" other than Legal Research and Writing. Between 10% and 35% of students must receive a C or lower in fixed required courses other than LRW. "Fixed required courses" includes all 1L doctrinal courses, as well as Evidence, Legal Profession, and Constitutional Law I and II. |
| University of Oklahoma College of Law | Mandatory mean between 8.1–8.5 on a 12 point scale (1L only) (between B and B+); no mandatory curve for 2L and 3L |
| University of Oregon School of Law | 2.67–2.75 |
| Pace University School of Law | 2.3–2.5 1L; 2.3–2.7 2/3L |
| Pennsylvania State University – Dickinson School of Law | 2.90–3.10 |
| Pepperdine University Rick J. Caruso School of Law | 3.0 (1L); 3.33 (upper-level) |
| University of Pittsburgh School of Law | 3.00 |
| Quinnipiac University School of Law | 3.02 |
| University of Richmond School of Law | 3.20–3.40 |
| Roger Williams University School of Law | 2.65–2.85 1L; 2.80–3.1 2L |
| Rutgers School of Law | 2.95–3.1 (mean) 1L; 3.1–3.4 (mean) upperclass courses |
| St. John's University School of Law | 3.2–3.3 (mean) |
| Saint Louis University School of Law | 1L: 2.7–2.9; 2/3L: 2.75–3.25 (large class); 2.65–3.4 (small class) |
| University of St. Thomas School of Law | 2.70–3.10 |
| University of San Diego School of Law | 2.95–3.05 |
| University of San Francisco School of Law | 2.73–2.99 |
| Seattle University School of Law | 3.1–3.2 |
| Seton Hall University School of Law | 3.0 |
| University of La Verne College of Law | 2.50 |
| University of South Carolina School of Law | 2.9–3.1 |
| University of Southern California School of Law | 3.30 |
| South Texas College of Law Houston | 2.85–3.15 |
| Southern Illinois University School of Law | 2.55–2.80 |
| Southern Methodist University Dedman School of Law | 3.093 1L/2E; 3.090 2L/3E; 3.198 3L/4E (graduating) |
| Southwestern Law School | 2.80 (1L mean); 3.00 (2L/3L mean) |
| St. Mary's University School of Law | B- median (1L); B or B+ median depending on the course (2L or 3L). Between 10% and 25% of grades must be C− or lower. Between 10% and 15% of grades must be B+ or higher. |
| Suffolk University Law School | 3.02 (1L); 3.16 (2L/3L) |
| Syracuse University College of Law | ~3.0 (1L) |
| Temple University Beasley School of Law | 3.15 |
| University of Tennessee College of Law | 3.1 |
| University of Texas School of Law | 3.25–3.35. Various exceptions exist. 30-40% of grades in most 1L classes must be A− or higher, with 15% B− or lower. |
| Texas A&M University School of Law | 3.20 |
| Thomas M. Cooley Law School | 2.00–2.40 |
| Tulane University Law School | 3.20–3.30 |
| University of Tulsa College of Law | 2.50–2.67 |
| University of Utah, S.J. Quinney College of Law | 3.38 |
| Valparaiso University School of Law | 2.50–2.70 |
| Vanderbilt University Law School | 3.30 |
| Vermont Law School | 2.70–3.00 |
| Villanova University School of Law | 3.1 |
| Washington and Lee University School of Law | 3.330 |
| Washington University School of Law | 3.6 (1L); based on mean GPA of all students in the course (upper level) |
| University of Washington School of Law | 3.40 |
| Wake Forest University School of Law | 3.33 mandatory grading curve; 3.50 for legal writing courses |
| West Virginia University College of Law | 2.95–3.05 first-year doctrinal courses, 3.15–3.25 upper-level courses |
| Whittier Law School | 2.50–2.75 (1L); 2.50–2.88 (2L/3L) |
| Widener University School of Law | 2.30–2.75 (1L), 2.50–2.85 (upper level required), 2.50–3.10 (upper level elective, >20 students), 2.50–3.40 (upper level elective, ≤20 students) |
| William Mitchell College of Law | 1L classes-2.9 upper level (non-1L) classes, mean between 2.7 and 3.3 |
| University of Wisconsin Law School | 3.2–3.4 on the 4.3 scale |
| University of Wyoming College of Law | 2.60–3.00 |

== Class rank and GPA not reported ==
- American University Washington College of Law – No curve. Estimated class rankings are published after each semester. Estimates of numerical rankings are only reported after graduation.
- University at Buffalo Law School – no curve, but benchmarks for top 5%, 10%, 15%, 20% and 25% for each class are released after each semester
- Columbia Law School – 25-30% of 1L class grades are A−'s or higher; 55-65% B+ or higher; 35-45% B or below. GPA not reported. Upper year courses have an easier curve. GPA calculated based on 4.33 scale.
- New York University School of Law – not reported, but likely around 3.3 after 1L. Only 31% of 1L class grades are A−'s or higher.
- University of Michigan Law School – class rank is not established until after graduation
- University of New Mexico School of Law – class rank is not provided but a bar graph is provided showing GPA distribution
- University of Notre Dame Law School – 1L courses (except for 1L elective, which is graded as an upper‐level course, and Legal Writing (I & II)) mean must be between 3.25 and 3.30 with a mandatory distribution. 1L Legal Writing (I & II) Mean: 3.15 to 3.45. Large upper-level courses for 2L and 3L (>25 students) must have a mean between 3.25 and 3.35 with a mandatory distribution. Paper-Based Small Upper-Level Courses (10 to 24 students) Mean: 3.15 to 3.60. Small upper-level courses (10 to 24 students) must have a mean between 3.15 and 3.45 with no mandatory distribution. Small courses (9 or fewer students) do not have a required curve.
- University of Pennsylvania Law School – In typical circumstances moderate- to large-sized classes will approximate the following distribution (± 5%): the top 10% in the A category (including the grade of A+, if any), the next 15% in the A− category, followed by the next 25% in the B+ category, followed by the next 25% in the B category (followed by B− and C). This curve is mandatory for all 1L courses, including electives. The 1L LPS course (Legal Writing) is graded on an Honors/Pass/Fail basis. The school does not report that information or permit students to include it on resumes.
- Rutgers School of Law–Camden – class rank was eliminated in 1972; each semester, the law school identifies Dean's Scholars as the top 5% and Dean's List as the next 20%; at graduation, highest honors and high honors are determined by the faculty and honors is given to the top 15%
- Rutgers School of Law–Newark – class rank is not published; however, upon graduation, rank is used to determine graduation honors with top 20% awarded cum laude; top 10% awarded Order of the Coif and magna cum laude; and top 3% awarded summa cum laude.
- University of Texas School of Law – "It is the policy of The University of Texas School of Law not to rank its students on the basis of academic standing." Therefore, students may not estimate class standing or indicate a percentile ranking on their resumes, cover letters or application materials. UT Law does, however, release interim cutoffs to continuing students for top 25% and top 50% at the end of the school year. Additionally, the school bestows honors on the top 1%, 5%, 10%, and 35% of graduating students. The top sixteen students in the class at the end of the second year are also recognized as Chancellors, with the top four students being identified in order as Grand Chancellor, Vice-Chancellor, Clerk, and Keeper of the Peregrinus.

== Irregular grading systems ==
The following law schools have adopted a grading system which does not allow for the calculation of a comparable median GPA on a 4.0 scale, if any GPA is recorded at all:

- Berkeley Law, University of California, Berkeley School of Law – pass/no pass system with 10% of first-years receiving pass with high honors and 30% of first-year students receiving pass with honors in each class; for upper division classes (2L and 3L years) up to 15% of in a class may receive high honors and up to 45% may receive either honors or high honors. Additionally, the top student in a course may be awarded the American Jurisprudence Award. The second-highest performing student in a course may be awarded the Prosser Prize.
- Campbell Law School – mandatory median (82, or a C)
- Harvard Law School – The current grading system of dean's scholar, honors, pass, low pass, and fail had at one time a recommended curve of 37% honors, 55% pass, and 8% low pass in classes with over 30 JD and LLM students. Between 1970 and 2008 Harvard established a GPA cut-off required in order to obtain the summa cum laude distinction. During that time, only five students obtained the summa cum laude distinction, namely Lewis Sargentich (1970), Isaac Pachulski (1974), Peter Huber (1982), Lisa Ann Grow/Sun (1997) and Julian Poon (1999). In all other years during that time period, the top student only managed to obtain the magna cum laude distinction. Since 2008, to address the difficulty of obtaining the summa cum laude distinction, in a year where no student manages to meet the GPA cut-off, Harvard will now award summa cum laude to the top student of the year.
- Howard University School of Law – uses a scale of 72–100; the mandatory mean range for first-year courses is 82–85. Below are the class rankings:
- Northeastern University School of Law – written evaluations given for each course with honorifics (High Honors and Honors) awarded "for strong academic performance."
- Northwestern Pritzker School of Law – Class rank is not computed for any students
- Stanford Law School – pass/no pass system with honors and distinctions, with a hard limit of 30% honors in lecture classes and 40% in seminars
- University of Chicago Law School – uses unusual numeric grade with median of 177
- Wake Forest University School of Law – curved at 85 (ended with the Class of 2017). Beginning with the Class of 2018: curved at 88. *Update – Beginning with the Class of 2019: A+ 4.00; A 4.00; A− 3.67; B+ 3.33; B 3.00; B− 2.67; C+ 2.33; C 2.00; C− 1.67; D+ 1.33; D 1.00; D− 0.67; F 0.00; H Honors; P Pass; LP Low Pass; F Fail.
- Yale Law School – honors/pass/fail system with no fixed curve
- University of Wisconsin Law School – GPA calculated based on a 4.3 scale
