= Humphreys College Laurence Drivon School of Law =

Californian nonprofit law school

- Parent school: Humphreys University
- Established: 1951
- School type: Private Law School
- Dean: Matthew Reynolds
- Location: Stockton, California, US; 38°00′40″N 121°18′59″W
- Enrollment: 150
- Faculty: 30
- Bar pass rate: July 2015: 13% (1st time takers), 0% (repeaters)
- Website: Laurence Drivon School of Law

The Humphreys University Laurence Drivon School of Law is an independent, nonprofit law school located in Stockton, California. The School of Law is approved by the Committee of Bar Examiners of the State Bar of California and the Western Association of Schools and Colleges but neither has nor seeks accreditation by the American Bar Association.

== History ==
The School of Law was founded in 1951 as a part of Humphreys College; a second law school was later founded in Fresno, but it no longer exists. Originally called Humphreys College School of Law, it was renamed Humphreys College Laurence Drivon School of Law to honor the passing of long-time supporter, Laurence Drivon. This coincided with the school's move from shared facilities to its own building in 2004.

The building was dedicated in a ceremony by then-Mayor Edward Chavez in 2005 after construction had completed on its courtroom—dedicated as the "Carcione Courtroom"—after Joseph Carcione (of KCBS fame) by his son, attorney Joseph William Carcione, Jr.

=== Presidents ===
- John R. Humphreys, Jr., 1951–1980
- Robert G. Humphreys, 1980–present

== Community service ==
The School of Law hosts a local chapter of The Judge Consuelo M. Callahan American Inn of Court. A small claims clinic is provided as a service to the community on a monthly basis utilizing students as advisers under the direction of professors and instructors, most of whom remain active and practicing attorneys. Since 2007, the School of Law has hosted the Court-provided education seminars for Grand Jury appointees. The Law School Admission Test (LSAT) is hosted quarterly by the School of Law on behalf of the Law School Admission Council (LSAC).

Additionally, from October 2007 to March 2008, the School of Law courtroom served as a temporary branch of the San Joaquin County Superior Court while new county courtrooms were being built.
