= Robert MacCrate =

American lawyer

Robert MacCrate (July 18, 1921 – April 6, 2016) was an American lawyer who served as counsel to New York Governor Nelson D. Rockefeller and as Special Counsel to the Department of the Army for its investigation of the My Lai Massacre. In the late 1980s, MacCrate served as president of both the New York State Bar Association and the American Bar Association ("ABA"). MacCrate later chaired the ABA Task Force on Law Schools and the Profession. The Task Force's Report, widely known as the MacCrate Report, was issued in July 1992. MacCrate was a partner and vice chairman of Sullivan & Cromwell LLP. Although retired from active practice, MacCrate continued to serve on many boards and was active as a Senior Counsel of Sullivan & Cromwell until his death in 2016.

Robert MacCrate's father, John MacCrate, served in the U.S. House of Representatives before serving as a justice of the Supreme Court of the State of New York.

== The MacCrate Report ==
With the backing of the ABA Task Force on Law Schools and the Profession, the MacCrate Report criticized the state of American legal education and called for a practice-oriented, rather than theory-oriented, approach to legal education. Specifically, the MacCrate Report suggested mandatory externships with government agencies, judges, and pro bono legal assistance clinics. It also encouraged state Bar associations to alter Bar examinations to focus more on practice-oriented skills rather than rhetoric and legal maxims, "to ensure that applicants are ready to assume their responsibilities in practice." While the MacCrate Report is widely viewed as the template for modern legal education in the United States, many traditional and high-ranking law schools have yet to adopt many of its recommendations. Because of this resistance to practice-oriented legal education, many have called into question the existing law school ranking system, generated entirely by U.S. News & World Report, and criticized it as being outdated and reflecting American upper class paradigms rather than an ability to produce competent attorneys. This resistance has only added to the continually increasing criticism and mistrust of the law school ranking system.

== Education ==
MacCrate was a 1939 graduate of Brooklyn Friends School, a 1943 graduate of Haverford College, and a 1948 graduate of the Harvard Law School. He received honorary doctorates from Union College in 1986, Haverford College in 1987, Dickinson College in 1987, William Mitchell in 1994, Quinnipiac Law School in 1995, CUNY School of Law, and University of South Carolina in 2004.

== Death ==
MacCrate died aged 94 on 6 April 2016 at his home in Plandome, New York.
