= Northwestern California University School of Law =

Online-only law school in California, USA

Coordinates: 38°36′21″N 121°30′44″W

- Motto: "Liberty with responsibility"
- Established: 1982; 44 years ago
- School type: Private online law school
- Dean: Michael P. Clancey
- Location: Sacramento, California, US
- Enrollment: 889 (613 1st year, 173 2nd year, 72 3rd year, 31 4th year)
- Faculty: 3 (FT), 17 (PT)
- Bar pass rate: 50% (July 2025, first-time takers); 82% cumulative five-year California bar passage rate for the August 1, 2019–July 31, 2024 reporting period
- Website: nwculaw.edu

The Northwestern California University School of Law is an online law school registered in Sacramento, California, founded in 1982. It is approved and accredited by the Committee of Bar Examiners of the State Bar of California, and is authorized to award the Juris Doctor degree upon completion and graduation from the program. However, it is not accredited by the American Bar Association (ABA).

== Academics ==
NWCU offers the Juris Doctor (JD) degree. Graduates receive the JD degree after the successful completion of their four-year part-time program, which must be completed continuously.

The NWCU Law program is regulated according to the standards set by the State Bar of California, requiring 3,600 hours of verified academic engagement and study in total. Foundational classes are taught in 12-month blocks.

The school delivers courses entirely through a distance education format. The main teaching medium is the internet by means of virtual classrooms, discussion boards, live online audio and video lectures, online study groups, and the use of videoconferencing. NWCU Law offers its courses through eJuris, an online law school platform developed by the school. All students are also provided with access to LexisNexis and to CALI.

== Accreditation ==
The Northwestern California University School of Law is approved and accredited by the Committee of Bar Examiners of the State Bar of California. Students to whom the school awards the JD degree are eligible to take the California Bar Examination and become licensed in the State of California. The school is not accredited by the American Bar Association (ABA). As a result, students are generally not permitted to take the bar exam outside of California immediately after graduation. Currently 23 states allow graduates to take their respective bar exams and be admitted to practice law after passing the bar in California and practicing for a set number of years.

== Admissions ==
For the class entering in 2025, the school accepted 1235 out of 1697 applicants (72.8%), with 613 of those accepted enrolling, a 49.6% yield rate. The school does not require submission of LSAT scores. The median undergraduate GPA was 3.16. Its 25th and 75th percentile GPAs were 2.77 and 3.56.

== Employment ==
By 2025, 21% of the 2022 graduates who had passed the bar exam and responded to the school's survey request were employed in positions requiring bar passage (i.e. as attorneys) and a further 36% were employed in JD advantage positions.

== Tuition ==
The total tuition and fees for the four-year program is $20,975, not inclusive of books or other expenses.

== Notable alumni ==
- Max Hardberger (1998), adventurer, ship captain, aviator, ship recovery specialist, and author.
- Mark Whitacre, president of Archer Daniels Midland's bioproducts division, who became a whistleblower under U.S. federal whistleblower statutes. The movie The Informant! starring Matt Damon was based on Whitacre's role in the ADM price-fixing case.
