= Abraham Lincoln University =

Private, for-profit online university based in Glendale, California

Abraham Lincoln University (ALU) is a private, for-profit online university based in Glendale, California.

== History ==
ALU was founded in 1996 by Hyung J. Park, a tax attorney and graduate of Loyola Law School. Classes initially were held in a conference room in his office. Park named his school after Abraham Lincoln partly because Lincoln had taught himself law.

Park established ALU with the philosophy of "flexibility and affordability" for working professionals to maintain current employment while studying law at an accredited institution under California law. In addition to its core law school curriculum, ALU programs have expanded to include diplomas and certificates and undergraduate, graduate, and doctoral degrees in business administration, criminal justice, general studies, law, and legal studies.

== Academics ==
Abraham Lincoln University offers online associate, bachelor's, master's, and doctorate degrees, plus diplomas and certificates.

ALU is a 100% online institution, offering alternative venues to engage students via online, live-engagement sessions and recorded lectures. Classes are archived online for review during each class. Students have full-time access to lectures. Students and professors also participate in online discussion boards.

== Accreditation, memberships, and registrations ==
Abraham Lincoln University is accredited by the Distance Education Accrediting Commission (DEAC). Its School of Law is registered with the Committee of Bar Examiners of the State Bar of California in the unaccredited distance learning school category, but is not accredited by the American Bar Association. As such, its graduates are eligible to sit for the bar exam only in California, not in any other states. Also, the graduates are required to pass the First-Year Law Students' Examination (FYLSX) to qualify to sit for the California bar exam.

ALU's academic programs, with the exception of the Juris Doctor degree program, have been licensed by the California Bureau for Private Postsecondary Education (BPPE) by institutional license through accreditation. ALU's Juris Doctor distance learning degree is exempt from BPPE oversight and is instead under the authority of the Committee of Bar Examiners of the State Bar of California.

== Community involvement ==
Abraham Lincoln University offers free law clinics to women in need of legal advice at the Downtown Women's Center, a homeless shelter in Los Angeles. These include a forthcoming divorce clinic and an ongoing expungement clinic to help reduce recidivism rates. Law students are encouraged to volunteer.

== Bar pass rate ==
The most recent data from the California Bar Examination show that no ALU students attempted to pass the bar for the first time in July 2022. Of the 38 examinees who attempted the bar for at least the second time, 3 (8%) passed.

In 2015, the university confirmed that it actively recruits students without the LSAT exam.
