= St. Francis School of Law =

Online law school in California, US

- Parent school: Baker College
- Established: Fall 2011
- School type: Private online law school
- Dean: Steven Hoffman
- Location: Newport Beach, CA, US
- Bar pass rate: 53.8% (total first-time takers, 2016-2022)
- Website: www.stfrancislaw.com

The St. Francis School of Law is an online law school based in Newport Beach, California, founded in 2011. Upon completion of the four year part-time program, students earn a Juris Doctor degree (J.D.). The program utilizes live online classes taught by professors with legal practice experience. It is registered as a distance learning law school with the State Bar of California. The school was purchased by Baker College in 2013.

== Degrees offered ==
A Juris Doctor (J.D.) law degree is currently the only degree offered. The online J.D. program is a four-year program in which students must complete 48 to 52 weeks of instruction each year. Students who complete St. Francis' online J.D. program will have met the legal education requirement of the State Bar of California and may apply for admission to the State Bar of California to practice law.

== Accreditation ==
St. Francis is approved by the Committee of Bar Examiners of the State Bar of California, thus allowing graduating students to take the California Bar Exam. It is not accredited by the American Bar Association; as a result, graduates are generally not qualified to take the bar exam and practice outside of California.

== Bar passage ==
As of 2022, 67% of St. Francis students who had graduated in the past five years had passed the California bar exam. This exceeds the 40% minimum rate for California accredited law schools, but is below the 75% require for ABA approved law schools. Due to the small number of St. Francis graduates taking the bar exam, statistics on St. Francis graduates' performance on individual exams are not published by the California state bar. According to statistics published by St. Francis itself, the first-time pass rate for St. Francis graduates who took the bar exam between July 2016 and July 2022 was 53.8% (21 of 39 takers).

== Faculty ==
St. Francis' faculty members are practicing attorneys with professional and teaching experience.

== Student population ==
As quoted in a U.S. News & World Report article about online law schools, former dean Peter Young said St. Francis focuses on "entrepreneurs, working professionals and those considering a career change." Since 2014, St. Francis has expanded the original mission of focusing on working professionals by updating curriculum, course content, and the classroom structure to cater to those that do want to practice law.

== Tuition ==
St. Francis' tuition is $13,000, not inclusive of books and other expenses. The total for tuition and books for the four-year program is approximately $57,000.
