= Southern California Institute of Law =

Private unaccredited law school in California, U.S.

- Established: 1986
- School type: Private unaccredited
- Dean: Stanislaus Pulle
- Location: Ventura, CA, US; 34°16′01″N 119°12′47″W
- Faculty: 34
- Bar pass rate: 14.3% (2024)
- Website: www.lawdegree.com

Southern California Institute of Law (SCIL) is a private California registered but unaccredited law school located in Ventura, California.

== History ==
Southern California Institute of Law was founded in 1986 as a fixed facility law school accredited by the State Bar of California for twenty-five years, with campuses in both Ventura and Santa Barbara, California, until June 1, 2020. Originally a part-time evening only law school, it catered to working adults.

=== Lawsuits ===
In 2013, SCIL sued the State Bar of California over a requirement that California accredited law schools must maintain a 40% percent bar passage rate over a rolling five-year period, arguing that the State Bar had violated the SCIL's First Amendment rights, that the 40% benchmark was arbitrary and capricious, and that it violated the state's separation of powers. The lawsuit was dismissed by the court with prejudice. The court ruled that the State Bar had exercised its rulemaking authority under the inherent authority of the Supreme Court of California over law school accreditation. The court ruled that the State Bar does not function as an executive agency of the legislature, whereby it would be subject to the substantial evidence rule of the California Administrative Procedure Act. Rather, the court held that the rational basis test applied.

SCIL also filed suit in federal court and filed an appeal in the Ninth Circuit Court of Appeals, which, in 2015, affirmed the original U.S. District Court's decision to toss the lawsuit. In 2016, after SCIL filed an action in state court, the case was dismissed on grounds of issue preclusion and was later affirmed by a state appeals court.

=== Registered but unaccredited school ===
Since 2020, it operates as an unaccredited distance learning law school with a Juris Doctor degree program. SCIL is not approved by the American Bar Association. SCIL is however registered with State Bar of California Committee of Bar Examiners. Its graduates are not automatically qualified to take the bar exam in California without meeting unaccredited school requirements and are not qualified to take a bar exam or practice law outside of California.

Students are required to engage in the "study of law diligently and in good faith for at least four years" with each of the four years consisting of at "least 864 hours of preparation and study over no fewer than forty-eight and no more than fifty-two consecutive weeks...evidenced by a transcript that indicates the date each course began and ended." In addition, they must pass the First-Year Law Students' Examination (FYLSE, popularly known as the "baby bar") before receiving credit for their law study.

== Tuition ==
As of 2025, tuition for the 4-year JD degree was $13,300.
