= Law school rankings in the United States =

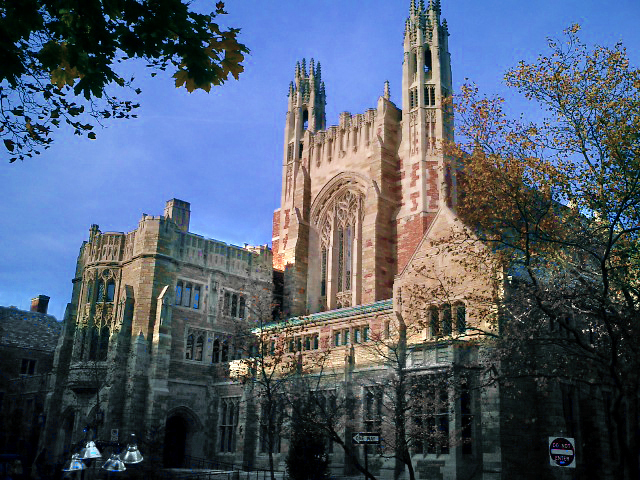
Yale Law School

Law school rankings are a specific subset of college and university rankings dealing specifically with law schools. Like college and university rankings, law school rankings can be based on empirical data, subjectively-perceived qualitative data (often survey research of educators, law professors, lawyers, students, or others), or some combination of these. Such rankings are often consulted by prospective students as they choose which schools they will apply to or which school they will attend. There are several different law school rankings, each of which has a different emphasis and methodology.

== U.S. News & World Report rankings ==
U.S. News & World Report (U.S. News), then a widely read news magazine, first ranked law schools in 1987. U.S. News currently lists all American Bar Association-accredited law schools, with the bottom 10% of schools grouped and listed alphabetically. U.S. News also publishes rankings for 13 types of specialty programs. U.S. News law school rankings tend to fluctuate annually.

The magazine has continuously published updated rankings on an annual basis since 1990. There has been some degree of consistency at the top of the U.S. News rankings since their inception, with Yale Law School ranking first in every edition of the rankings until 2026, when Stanford Law School took the spot with Yale tied with UChicago in 2nd.

=== Top 14 law schools ===
"T14" law schools, historically (public schools in blue)

There exists an informal and unofficial category known as the "Top Fourteen", "Top 14", or "T14", which has historically referred to the institutions that most frequently claim the top 14 spots in the yearly U.S. News & World Report ranking of American law schools, with T14 schools remaining the only ones to have ever placed within the top ten spots in these rankings. Although "T14" is not a designation used by U.S. News itself, the term is "widely known in the legal community".

The schools that most frequently have appeared at the top of the U.S. News & World Report ranking of American law schools, commonly known as the "Top 14" or "T14" are, in alphabetical order:

- Columbia Law School
- Cornell Law School
- Duke University School of Law
- Georgetown University Law Center
- Harvard Law School
- New York University School of Law
- Northwestern University School of Law
- Stanford Law School
- UC Berkeley School of Law
- University of Chicago Law School
- University of Michigan Law School
- University of Pennsylvania Law School
- University of Virginia School of Law
- Yale Law School

== Academic Ranking of World Universities ==
In 2017, the Academic Ranking of World Universities (ARWU) released its rankings of world universities in the subject of law by taking into account only the academic strength of the institution. In 2021, ARWU ranked all T14 US Law Schools within the world's top 20 law schools.

== National Law Journal's Go-To Law School Rankings ==
Several ranking systems are explicitly designed to focus on employment outcomes at or shortly after graduation, including rankings by the National Law Journal and Law.com.

The National Law Journal ranks the top 50 law schools by the percentage of juris doctor graduates who took jobs at NLJ 250 firms, the nation's largest by headcount as identified by The National Law Journal's annual survey. It provides an alternative comparison of its own employment-based rankings to the U.S. News rankings.

== QS World University Rankings ==
The 2020 QS World University Rankings for Law ranked 14 U.S. institutions in the top 50 worldwide. The U.S. institutions in the top 10 were Harvard Law School, which ranked first, with Yale Law School ranked fourth, Stanford Law School ranked fifth, NYU School of Law ranked sixth, UC Berkeley School of Law ranked seventh, and Columbia Law School ranked tenth. Every other law school in U.S. News & World Report's T14 rankings except University of Virginia School of Law made the QS Top 50.

== Social Science Research Network ==
Social Science Research Network—a repository for draft and completed scholarship in law and the social sciences—publishes monthly rankings of law schools based on the number of times faculty members' scholarship was downloaded. Rankings are available by total number of downloads, total number of downloads within the last 12 months, and downloads per faculty member to adjust for the size of different institutions. SSRN also provides rankings of individual law school faculty members on these metrics.

== Criticisms of rankings ==
Among the criticisms of law school rankings is that they are arbitrary in the characteristics they measure and the value given to each one. Another complaint is that a prospective law student should take into account the "fit" and appropriateness of each school, and that there is not a "one size fits all" ranking. Others complain that common rankings shortchange schools due to geographical or demographic reasons.

An article by Espeland and Sauder (2007), published in the American Journal of Sociology, discusses the increasing use of public measures for evaluating the performance of individuals and organizations, highlighting their significant social impact on accountability and governance. Using media rankings of law schools as a case study, it emphasizes the concept of reactivity—how people change their behavior in response to being evaluated. The authors demonstrate that these measures have numerous unintended consequences and identify mechanisms like self-fulfilling prophecy and commensuration that drive reactivity. They outline effects such as redistribution of resources, redefinition of work, and proliferation of gaming strategies. The article suggests that the growing influence of these measures necessitates more systematic scholarly investigation due to their profound negative impact on institutions and the potential to perpetuate inequalities. Lastly, it raises ethical concerns about the implications of these measures, noting their influence on the redistribution of resources and the reinforcement of inequalities.

The American Bar Association, which has consistently refused to support or participate in law school rankings, has issued disclaimers on law school rating systems, and encourages prospective law students to consider a variety of factors in making their choice among schools. Further, the Association of American Law Schools has also voiced criticisms of U.S. News's ranking system. Carl Monk, its former executive director, once went so far as to say "these rankings are a misleading and deceptive, profit-generating commercial enterprise that compromises U.S. News & World Report's journalistic integrity."

As a response to the prevalence of law school rankings, the ABA and the LSAC publish an annual law school guide. This guide, which does not seek to rank or sort law schools by any criteria, instead seeks to provide the reader with a set of standard, important data on which to judge law schools. It contains information on all 200 ABA-Approved Law Schools. This reference, called The Official Guide to ABA-Approved Law Schools is provided free online and also in print for a small cost. A similar guide for Canadian Law Schools is also published by the Law School Admission Council and is called Official Guide to Canadian Law Schools. These guides seek to serve as an alternative to the U.S. News Rankings and law school rankings in general.

Additionally, the American Bar Association issued the MacCrate Report in 1992, which outlined many fundamental problems with modern legal education and called for reform in American law schools. While the report was hailed as a "template for modern legal education", its practice-oriented tenets have met resistance by law schools."

Ranking systems, most prominently that of U.S. News, has not allowed these criticisms to go unanswered. They regularly outline and justify their methodology alongside the rankings, and have even published defenses of their value. Additionally, law professors William Henderson and Andrew Morriss have come out with a study criticizing law schools' (and the ABA's) refusal to adopt any better objective comparison method for the continued widespread reliance on U.S. News. Henderson and Morriss allege that law schools' attempts to "game" their U.S. News ranking by manipulating postgraduation employment statistics or applicant selectivity have led U.S. News to adjust its methodology accordingly, resulting in a counter-productive cycle. They go on to suggest that the ABA should use its accreditation power to mandate greater transparency in law schools' statistical reporting.

In March 2011, Loyola Law School Dean Victor Gold in Los Angeles penned an op-ed in the Huffington Post, accusing U.S. News & World Report of "refus[ing] to consider diversity as a factor in its ranking system." Gold asserted that "[t]here is a broad consensus among law school deans and professors that diversity enriches law school education." Loyola, which has a large Asian student body, claims 37% of its students are "minorities", but it does not provide any specifics.

Between November and December 2022, 12 of the 14 "T14" law Schools announced that they would no longer participate in the U.S. News rankings by declining to submit admissions data, with University of Chicago Law School and Cornell Law School continuing to do so. One of their criticisms was that the rankings don't give enough credit to programs that train lawyers interested in public service. In response, U.S. News pledged to modify its law school rankings to capture the individual nuances of each school. Additionally, the magazine said that it will continue ranking all fully accredited law schools, regardless of whether schools agree to submit their data.

== Impact of rankings ==
Despite these criticisms, law school rankings in general and those by U.S. News in particular play a role in the world of legal education. This pressure has also resulted in various schools "gaming the rankings". In a March 2003 article in Student Lawyer, Jane Easter Bahls stated that, in order to appear more selective, some law schools reject applicants whose high LSAT scores indicate that they probably would go somewhere else. Other schools, in an attempt to increase the amount of money spent per student, increase tuition and return it to the students as financial aid.
