= For-profit colleges and universities in the United States =

Colleges that rely on investors to survive

For-profit colleges and universities, also known as proprietary colleges, are post-secondary schools that rely on investors, and survive by making a profit. They include for-profit vocational and technical schools, career colleges, and universities (many of which have predominantly online instruction). For-profit colleges and universities have frequently offered career-oriented curricula including culinary arts, business and technology (including coding bootcamps), and health care. These institutions have a long history in the United States, and grew rapidly from 1972 to 2009. The growth of for-profit education has been fueled by government funding as well as corporate investment, including private equity.

== History ==
=== Origins ===
For-profit colleges in the U.S. have their origins in the Colonial Era. According to AJ Angulo, 19th century for-profit colleges offering practical skills expanded across the United States, meeting a demand for practical job training. In the 1830s and 1840s, proprietary business schools in Boston, Brooklyn, and Philadelphia offered penmanship and accounting classes. The expansion continued in the 1850s and 1860s, to Chicago, New Orleans, Memphis, and San Jose. Angulo estimated that there were 2,000 for-profit colleges with more than 240,000 students during the period, if fly-by-night schools were included. The Bryant & Stratton Chain School grew to about 50 schools by 1864. As early as 1892, the University of Chicago operated a correspondence school, a money-making strategy emulated by many other universities. The decline of proprietary colleges was aided by the Smith-Hughes Act of 1917. Also known as the National Vocational Education Act, this legislation funded public vocational education.

=== Growth: (1940s to 2010) ===
In the 1940s, "fly-by-night commercial vocational 'schools' sprang up to collect veterans' tuition grants" due to the newly created GI Bill's lax requirements and limited oversight to prevent such abuses. For-profit colleges grew significantly from 1972 to 1976, after the Higher Education Act of 1965, part of President Lyndon Johnson's "Great Society" of progressive reforms, was amended so that for-profit colleges could receive U.S. government funds, to include Pell Grants and federal student loans. From 1974 to 1986, for-profit colleges share of Pell Grants rose from 7 percent to 21 percent, even though for-profit colleges only enrolled 5 percent of all higher education students. In the 1980s, public higher education was also becoming increasingly privatized. In the late 1980s, Secretary of Education William Bennett hired Pelavin and Associates to investigate the problems with for-profit higher education. The investigators found widespread abuses across the industry.

From the late 1980s to the mid-1990s, Senator Sam Nunn led for more scrutiny of for-profit colleges. The General Accounting Office (GAO) also found that 135 for-profit colleges contributed to 54% of all student loan defaults. According to the U.S. Department of Education, the number of for-profit colleges rose from about 200 in 1986 to nearly 1,000 in 2007. From 1990 to 2009, for-profit colleges grew to 11.8 percent of all undergraduates. For-profit college enrollment expanded even more after the 1998 reauthorization of the Higher Education Act resulted in more deregulation. Secretary of Education Richard W. Riley appointed former Career College's Association President Stephen J. Blair as the Liaison for Proprietary Institutions. The industry also grew in the wake of state budget cuts, stagnation, and austerity in higher education funding that grew more visible in the 1980s and 1990s. With deregulation and the growth of for-profit colleges, initial public offerings of Devry, ITT Educational Services, Apollo Education Group, Corinthian Colleges, and Career Education Corporation occurred between 1991 and 1998. For-profit colleges became "the darlings of Wall Street". Also the advent of the Internet in the 1990s helped increase enrollment as many of the for-profit colleges were pioneers in online education. The George W. Bush Administration further deregulated the industry as many posts at the Department of Education (ED) were filled with for-profit administrators. In 2005, Department of Education Inspector General John B. Higgins reported that 74% of all institutional fraud investigations were for-profit colleges. The Los Angeles Times briefly described the role of Wall Street money in the growth of for-profit colleges. Increased capitalization of for-profit colleges occurred after banks such as Goldman Sachs and Wells Fargo and investment firms and hedge funds such as Blum Capital Partners and Warburg Pincus became large institutional investors in this industry. Private equity in for-profit education was associated with higher costs to students and declining outcomes: less spent on education, more student loan debt and lower student loan repayment rates, lower graduation rates, and lower earnings for graduates.

In the 2009–2010 academic year, for-profit higher education corporations received $32 billion in Title IV funding—more than 20% of all federal aid. As America's largest university, University of Phoenix, had an enrollment of 470,000 students and annual revenues approaching $5 billion. Research by Treasury Department economist Nicholas Turner and the Tratchtenberg School of Public Policy and Public Administration's Professor Stephanie Riegg Cellini found that students who attended for-profit colleges would have been better off not going to college at all, or attending a community college (which are non-profit); put differently, the for-profit colleges left students worse off than they were when they started. A 2010 report by the GAO documented misleading sales and marketing tactics used by for-profits. Critics also pointed out that more than half of for-profits' revenues were spent on marketing or extracted as profits, with less than half spent on instruction. A 2011 study by the National Bureau of Economic Research reported that students who attended for-profit education institutions were more likely to be unemployed, earn less, have higher debt levels, and were more likely to default on their student loans than similar students at non-profit educational institutions. Although for-profits typically serve students who are poorer or more likely to be minorities, these differences did not explain the differences in employment, income, debt levels, and student loan defaults. The GAO also found that graduates of for-profits were less likely to pass licensing exams, and that poor student performance could not be explained by different student demographics. The same year, The New York Times noted that for-profit higher education institutions often had much higher default rates than non-profits. Compared to community colleges, some for-profits may have higher completion rates for certificates and associate degree programs, but higher drop out rates for four-year bachelor's degrees. However, one- and two-year programs often may not provide much economic benefit to students because the boost to wages is offset by increased debt.

A two-year congressional investigation report—from a committee chaired by Senator Tom Harkin, D-Iowa—examined enrollment numbers in selected for-profit higher education institutions. The committee found that $32 billion in federal funds were spent in 2009–2010 on for-profit colleges. The majority of students left without a degree and carried post-schooling debt. The report said 54% of students in bachelor's degree programs dropped out before degree completion and 63% of students in associate degree programs dropped out. Additionally, recruitment training manuals at some schools targeted low-income students and attempted to elicit 'pain' and 'fear.' Recruitment manuals even included groups to target, including: "welfare mom w/kids", "pregnant ladies", and "experienced a recent death."

=== Decline of for-profit colleges and the rise of Online Program Managers (OPMs) (2011 to 2021) ===
Approximately 40 percent of all for-profit college campuses have closed since 2010. For-profit colleges received less government scrutiny by the Republican-controlled Senate after 2014, but were recognized as a problem by the U.S. House Subcommittee on Labor, Health and Human Services, Education and Related Agencies in 2019. Significant business failures and closings from 2015 to 2019 include Corinthian Colleges, ITT Technical Institute, Education Management Corporation, and Education Corporation of America. The Dream Center's collapse in 2018–2019 also included schools that had historically been for-profit institutions. Since 2015, student loan debt groups, including the Debt Collective and I Am Ai, have provided advocacy and support for students and former students of failing schools. Students who attended for-profit colleges make up a disproportionate percent of defaulted borrowers; accounting for approximately 11% of student borrowers and approximately 39% of defaults in 2011. In 2018, the National Center for Education Statistics reported that the 12-year student loan default rate for-profit colleges was 52 percent. The 12-year student loan default rate for African Americans going to for-profit colleges was reported to be 65.7 percent.

Decline in enrollment, revenues, and employees (2010 and 2017)

Fall/Year	Enrollment	Revenues	Employees
2010	2,430,657	29,603,059,000	295,476
2017	1,345,633	19,446,382,000	176,441

Under the Obama administration (2009–2017), for-profit colleges received greater scrutiny and negative attention from the U.S. government. State Attorneys General, the media, and scholars also investigated these schools. For-profit school enrollment reached its peak in 2009 and showed major declines by 2011. Corinthian Colleges (which included Heald College, Everest College, and Wyotech) and Education Management Corporation (which included the Art Institutes, Argosy University, and South University) faced enrollment declines and major financial trouble in 2014 and 2015; The 2012 Harkin Report stated that students at for-profit colleges made up "13 percent of the nation's college enrollment, but accounted for 47 percent of the defaults on loans. About 96 percent of students at for-profit schools took out loans, compared with 13 percent at community colleges and 48 percent at four-year public universities." A 2014 report by The Institute for College Access and Success showed that the likelihood of a student defaulting was three times more likely at a for-profit college than a 4-year public or non-profit college and almost four times more likely than a community college. In 2015, Corinthian Colleges filed for bankruptcy and all of its Heald College campuses were closed. More than 180 for-profit college campuses had closed between 2014 and 2016 and enrollment at the University of Phoenix chain fell 70% from its peak. In June 2016, Education Management (EDMC) announced that it would close all Brown Mackie College campuses. In September 2016, ITT Technical Institute closed all of its campuses, and the US Department of Education stripped ACICS of its accreditation powers. In 2017, the advocacy group the Debt Collective created its own, unofficial "Defense to Repayment App" that allowed former students of schools accused of fraud to pursue debt cancellation.

From 2017 to 2020, the Donald Trump administration and Secretary of Education Betsy DeVos accused the government of regulatory overreach and loosened regulations. In 2017 and 2018, Strayer University and Capella University agreed to merge as Strategic Education, and all Le Cordon Bleu schools were closing. At least 19 Art Institutes were also expected to close. EDMC sold its remaining schools to the non-profit Dream Foundation and Purdue University purchased Kaplan University. Atalem sold its declining DeVry University and the Keller School of Management to Cogswell Education. In 2018, the documentary Fail State chronicled the boom and bust of for-profit colleges, highlighting the abuses that led to their downfall. On August 10, 2018, U.S. Education Secretary Betsy Devos scrapped a rule issued by ED in 2010 which would have forced for-profit colleges to prove that the students they enroll are able to attain "gainful employment." By the end of 2018, Education Corporation of America announced that they would be closing all of its campuses, which included its Virginia College campuses. In November 2018, ED restored ACICS as a higher education accreditor. From December 2018 to March 2019, Dream Center Education Holdings began closing and selling off schools. DCEH was the parent company of the Art Institutes, Argosy University, and South University. The National Student Clearinghouse reported that their for-profit college enrollment numbers for Fall 2018 had declined 15.1 percent from Fall 2017. In 2019, Argosy University closed all of its campuses. USA Today articles in March 2019 portrayed the collapse of the school as part of a trend, highlighting the losses of other for-profit colleges, including Brightwood College (2018), Vatterott College (2018), and Virginia College (2018). In a 2019 Brookings Institution report, students taking online courses at for-profit colleges were attracted to the programs for their ease of enrollment and help obtaining financial aid, but "disappointed with the poor quality of education. On April 12, 2019, Betsy DeVos was criticized for allowing five failing for-profit colleges to avoid posting a letter of credit. On April 14, 2019, NBC News Investigates reported on for-profit colleges that target veterans. The online version mentioned Full Sail University, Ashford University, Colorado Technical University, and University of Phoenix. In 2019, Accreditor WASC approved Ashford University's conversion to a non-profit. Its parent company, Zovio, however, continued to be a publicly traded for-profit college company. In December 2020, Congress passed a bill that improved safeguards for veterans exploited by predatory colleges.

In October 2021, Vista College, a Texas-based school with approximately 3000 students closed abruptly.

== List of for-profit schools and their brands ==
According to the National Center for Education Statistics, there were approximately 3,200 for-profit institutions in the U.S. in 2015. Many for-profit institutions are subsidiaries of larger companies.

== For-profit marketing, enrollment and lead generators ==
For-profit colleges use lead generation companies to target potential students and to take their personal information. However, as competition has heated up in U.S. higher education, traditional schools have also employed them. Lead generators use multiple strategies to find and enroll students. There are hundreds of sites on the internet that gather information for schools. The most notable lead generator is Education Dynamics. In September 2020, Education Dynamics purchased QuinStreet's higher education vertical.

== Structure of for-profit education ==
=== Sources of capital and cash flow ===
The main sources of initial capital for public for-profit colleges are institutional investors: international banks, hedge funds, institutional retirement funds, and state retirement funds. Wells Fargo was a major funder of Corinthian Colleges and Goldman Sachs provided a significant amount of capital to Education Management Corporation. More recently, special-purpose acquisition companies have invested in Edtech startups.

==== Title IV funds ====
The main source of cash flow consists of U.S. Department of Education Higher Education Act Title IV funds. Title IV funds include Federal Family Education Loans (FFEL), direct loans, Federal Perkins Loans, Federal Pell Grants, Academic Competitiveness Grants (ACG), National SMART Grants, Federal Supplemental Educational Opportunity Grants (FSEOG), and Federal Work-Study (FWS). In the 1990s, Congress began requiring that for-profit schools receive at least 10% of their revenues from non-federal student aid sources, which include the GI Bill.

==== GI Bill funds, Department of Defense Tuition Assistance and MyCAA ====
The for-profit education industry also receives billions of dollars through VA benefits also known as the GI Bill. In the 2010–2011 school year, more than $1 billion went to eight for-profit schools. In the 2012–2013 academic year, 31 percent of GI Bill funds went to for-profit colleges. Veteran participation in these schools, in effect, transferred $1.7 billion in post-9/11 GI Bill funds to these schools. According to a CBS News report in 2017, 40 percent of all GI Bill funds went to for-profit colleges. For-profit colleges receive money for servicemembers and their spouses attending college while still in the military. In fiscal year 2018, for-profit colleges received $181 million or 38 percent of all DOD TA funds. For-profit schools also receive money from DOD for education of military spouses. The program is known as MyCAA.

==== Other sources ====
These corporations also obtain cash flow through student private loans, corporate loans, and the selling of assets. Problems with high-interest private loans to students at Corinthian Colleges (Genesis loans) and ITT Tech (PEAKS and CUSO loans) have gained scrutiny from the Consumer Financial Protection Bureau and the Securities and Exchange Commission.

== Arguments for and against for-profit colleges ==
Although supporters of for-profit higher education have argued that the profit motive encourages efficiency, the for-profit educational industry has received severe negative criticism because of its sales techniques, high costs, and poor student outcomes. In some cases operators of for-profit colleges have faced criminal charges or other legal sanctions.

=== Benefits ===
Historically, for-profit education has offered open admissions to non-traditional students, convenience of schedule and location, instructors with workplace knowledge, and real world vocational training rather than traditional training. Critics of Wall Street–backed for-profit educators, however, have questioned these perceived benefits. For-profit schools like University of Phoenix have been more inclusive, recruiting and graduating more African Americans than public higher education. In 2012, The Journal of Blacks in Higher Education called University of Phoenix "a pillar of African American higher education." Through the Thurgood Marshall fund, students at 47 publicly supported historically Black colleges and universities, may supplement their on-campus course loads with course programs using the University of Phoenix online platform. For-profit colleges have also been seen as a second chance for students who have performed poorly in the past. It may be argued that for-profit colleges also created innovations that would force public higher education to be more responsive to student needs. For-profit colleges have been compared favorably to community colleges in regards to graduation rates, but these comparisons may be offering misleading statistical comparisons

=== Drawbacks ===
For decades, the U.S. Department of Education (ED) had not established gainful employment regulations. As concerns about the quality of programs at for-profit institutions arose, concerns about student debt grew as well. Such issues led to new initiatives outlining the gainful employment rules. The 2011 Senate HELP committee released data showing one in every four students who enrolled at a for-profit school defaulted on their loans within three years of leaving, with for-profit students accounting for almost half of all loan defaults. Most for-profit colleges charge enrollees much higher tuition rates than analogous programs at community colleges and state public universities despite credits being likely not eligible to be transferred to other institutions. In fact, 96% of students attending for-profit college applied for federal student loans compared to 13% at community colleges. During the 2009–2010 school years, for-profit colleges received almost $32 billion in grants and loans provided to students under federal student aid programs. This meant that nearly all students at for-profit institutions acquired student loan debt, even when they did not earn a degree or accumulate increased earning power through their studies.

Federal regulatory actions by ED attempted to address these issues in the Title IV of the Higher Education Act of 1965, as amended, implementing regulations specifying requirements for gainful employment. These rules outlined in a report by Congressional Research Service (CRS), aimed to hold for-profits accountable by creating standards, which would create more opportunity for gainful employment amongst enrollees. On June 30, 2012, the U.S. District Court for the District of Columbia decided to vacate most of the regulations. The court sustained that ED had the authority to regulate gainful employment, yet it cited ED had not provided rationale metrics or measures in the debt measures. Presently, only the disclosure requirements for prospective students are with placements rates, on time graduation rates and other similar information remain. On March 19, 2013, the judge ruled again in response to the ED's motion to reinstate the reporting requirements in order that it could implement the disclosure requirements of Gainful Employment. The judged denied the motion of the ED on the basis that the reporting requirements would violate the federal ban on the student unit record system. It is strongly debatable that the court's ruling negates the small amount of transparency and accountability mandated by the disclosure requirements, leaving the policy issue of for-profits being accountable for gainful employment unattended. Some former students claim that for-profit colleges make them feel like they went to the flea market and bought themselves a degree.

Some critics have called for-profit education "subprime education", in an analogy with the subprime mortgages bubble at the heart of the Great Recession – finding uninformed borrowers and loading them with debt they cannot afford, then securitizing and passing the loan onto third-party investors. Activist short seller Steve Eisman described the accreditation situation regarding for-profits like ITT as follows: "The scandal here is exactly akin to the rating agency role in subprime securitizations." Two documentaries by Frontline focused on alleged abuses in for profit higher education. Holly Petraeus, a high-ranking official at the Consumer Financial Protection Bureau, has accused for-profits of preying on vulnerable military personnel. Petraeus wrote:"This gives for-profit colleges an incentive to see service members as nothing more than dollar signs in uniform, and to use aggressive marketing to draw them in and take out private loans...One of the most egregious reports of questionable marketing involved a college recruiter who visited a Marine barracks at Camp Lejeune, North Carolina. As the PBS program Frontline reported, the recruiter signed up Marines with serious brain injuries. The fact that some of them couldn't remember what courses they were taking was immaterial, as long as they signed on the dotted line." Opponents say that the fundamental purpose of an educational institution should be to educate, not to turn a profit.

In 2019, ED reported median student debt from for-profit colleges and found that among people pursuing a bachelor's degree, those who graduated from for-profits borrowed $43,600, compared to $27,900 for public college graduates and $32,500 for private nonprofit college graduates.

A report by the Student Borrower Protection Center found that for-profit colleges were more likely to cluster around communities of color.

== Accreditation and transfer-of-credits ==
Many for-profit institutions of higher education have national accreditation rather than regional accreditation. Regionally accredited schools are predominantly academically oriented, non-profit institutions. Nationally accredited schools are predominantly for-profit and offer vocational, career, or technical programs. Most regionally accredited schools will not accept transfer credits earned at a nationally accredited school because, except for some specialized areas such as nursing; the standards for regional accreditation are higher than those for national accreditation.

In the 2005 congressional discussions concerning reauthorization of the Higher Education Act and in the U.S. Secretary of Education's Commission on the Future of Higher Education, there were proposals, ultimately unsuccessful, to mandate that regional accrediting agencies bar the schools they accredit from basing decisions on whether or not to accept credits for transfer solely on the accreditation of the "sending" school. They could still reject the credits, but they would have to have additional reasons. The American Commission of Career Schools and Colleges (ACCSC), a nonprofit accreditor for-profit schools, supported the proposed rule. The ACCSC claims regionally accredited schools will not accept nationally accredited schools credits for purely arbitrary, prejudicial and/or anti-competitive reasons. It further stated that, since ED recognizes both national and regional accreditation, there is no reason for regionals to differentiate between the two and to do so amounts to an unwarranted denial of access. The position of the American Association of Collegiate Registrars and Admissions Officers (AACRAO) was that national accrediting standards were not as rigorous and, though they might be well-suited for vocational and career education, were ill-suited for academic institutions. AACRAO alleged that this proposed rule was unnecessary and unjustified, could threaten the autonomy and potentially lower the standards of regionally accredited schools, and drive up their costs. Furthermore, it stated the proposed rule was an attempt by the for-profits' "well-funded lobbyists" to obscure the difference between for-profits' "lax academic criteria for accreditation" and non-profits' higher standards.

Some for-profit schools have received regional accreditation, including American InterContinental University, American Public University System, Capella University, DeVry University, Kaplan University, National American University, Post University, San Joaquin Valley College, Strayer University, University of Phoenix, Universal Technical Institute, and Walden University.

Accrediting agencies have gained some scrutiny and criticism for conflicts of interest. Because these agencies receive their funding from the institutions themselves, they may have a vested interest in not aggressively supervising these for-profit colleges. According to Chris Kirkham and Kevin Short: "Two accrediting bodies...collectively monitor nearly 60 percent of all American for-profit colleges. They preside over almost half of those schools with the nation's worst student loan default rates....Ten of the 15 board members supervising the ACICS are drawn from the industry, including executives from Corinthian, Education Corporation of America and ITT Technical Institute. On the ACCSC board, industry executives fill eight of the 13 slots, representing publicly traded companies such as Universal Technical Institute and Kaplan Higher Education."

In 2016, 12 Attorneys General asked the US Department of Education to stop the renewal of ACICS, the Accrediting Council for Independent Colleges and Schools. ED deliberated on the fate of ACICS and its power to accredit schools for Title IV government funds. On June 23, 2016, The National Advisory Committee on Institutional Quality and Integrity (NACIQI), voted to revoke ACICS's power to accredit schools.

== Business failures ==
Notable failures include Corinthian Colleges (2015), ITT Technical Institute (2016), Education Management Corporation (2017), Education Corporation of America (2018) and Vatterott College (2018). In 2010, Trump University was closed by the State of New York for operating without a license. In 2014, FastTrain college closed after being raided by the FBI. In 2016, all campuses of Westwood College closed. In 2016, ED stripped ACICS, the accreditor of ITT Tech and many more colleges, of its accrediting power. ACICS was given the power back under Secretary of Education Betsy DeVos. In 2018 and 2019, Dream Center Education Holdings faced a financial crisis with colleges with Art Institutes, Argosy University, and South University brands, which were converted from for-profit to non-profit.

== Government scrutiny, criminal and civil investigations ==
According to A.J. Angulo, for-profit higher education in the U.S. has been the subject of government scrutiny from the mid-1980s to the 2010s.

In August 2010, the GAO reported on an investigation that randomly sampled student-recruiting practices of several for-profit institutions. Investigators posing as prospective students documented deceptive recruiting practices, including misleading information about costs and potential future earnings. They also reported that some recruiters urged them to provide false information on applications for financial aid. Out of the fifteen sampled, all had engaged in deceptive practices, improperly promising unrealistically high pay for graduating students, and four engaged in outright fraud, per a GAO report released at a hearing of the Health, Education, Labor and Pensions Committee on August 4, 2010.

In 2014, a criminal investigation of Corinthian Colleges was initiated. Until 2015, The U.S. Attorney General and at least eleven states maintained an $11 billion lawsuit against Education Management Corporation. The same year, the U.S. Consumer Financial Protection Bureau (CFPB) also filed a suit against ITT Educational Services, parent company of ITT Tech; in 2019, ITT settled for $60 million.

In 2016, Alejandro Amor, the founder of a college called FastTrain in Florida, was sentenced to eight years in federal prison for fraud.

== Attempts to regulate and deregulate the industry ==
The US Department of Education (DoED) has proposed rules, "gainful employment regulations", that would provide more transparency and accountability to institutions that offer professional and technical training. According to DoED, this regulation is an attempt to "protect borrowers and taxpayers." In his 2015 budget proposal, President Obama recommended greater regulation of for-profit education, including a closure of the loophole that exempted GI Bill money from being used in the 90-10 formula. In 2017, ED held public hearings were held in order to determine whether the government had overstepped regulation efforts, particularly with gainful employment and defense to repayment rules. In August 2017, Secretary of Education Betsy DeVos instituted policies to loosen regulations on for-profit colleges. In September 2017, the Trump Administration proposed to remove conflict of interest rules between VA officials and for-profit colleges. In March 2018, the House Subcommittee on Labor, Health and Human Services, Education and Related Agencies began reviewing problems related to for-profit colleges and student loan debt. Lobbyists for the for-profit higher education industry have taken several steps to stop regulation and to fight against transparency and accountability. They have also supported at least two lawsuits to squash gainful employment regulations.

== Student debt groups ==
Several student debt groups have been created since 2014, after the Debt Collective paid off student loans for 3,700 Everest College students. The groups include "I Am Ai," a group that offers support and advocacy for student debtors who attended the Art Institutes.

== For-profit colleges transitioning to non-profit colleges ==
Johnson and Wales University became a non-profit in 1963, after being a proprietary business school. Southern New Hampshire University transitioned from a for-profit school to a non-profit in 1968. More recently, several universities have transitioned to nonprofit status, including Keiser University, Remington College, Herzing University., Stevens-Henager College, Independence University, CollegeAmerica, Purdue University Global, and University of Arizona Global Campus. Journalists argue that these transitions are strategies to reduce state and federal regulations and to obtain more Title IV funds, as well as to improve reputations as for-profit education now has a stigma to the public.

In 2014, Grand Canyon University considered a transition to nonprofit status. In 2016, Grand Canyon's regional accreditation body, The Higher Learning Commission, formally rejected the university's petition for conversion to non-profit status. The commission's board of directors stated that the school did not meet all five criteria for "such a conversion". In 2018, Grand Canyon University petitioned for non-profit status. In 2018, Grand Canyon University attempted to regain its non-profit status but the U.S. Department of Education denied that change in 2019, and continues to classify the university as for-profit. In January 2021, Grand Canyon University sued the U.S. government for failure to recognize Grand Canyon University's transition to non-profit as legitimate. In November 2024, the United States Court of Appeals for the Ninth Circuit held in a unanimous 3-0 decision that the U.S. Department of Education applied the wrong legal standards in evaluating Grand Canyon University's application. The Ninth Circuit Court reversed the judgment of the district court, and remanded with instructions to set aside the U.S. government's denial.

In 2017, Kaplan University was sold to Purdue University and became Purdue University Global in 2018. Kaplan, however, became the servicer for the institution and the Higher Learning Commission continued to accredit the school.

In 2018, Ashford University petitioned for non-profit status. In 2019, the Internal Revenue Service granted Ashford University tax-exempt status. Ashford University was the major source of revenue for Bridgepoint Education, now known as Zovio. In 2020, University of Arizona announced an agreement to purchase Ashford University and rename it University of Arizona Global Campus.

In December 2020, Bryant & Stratton College announced that they would be donating the school to their non-profit family foundation.

== See also ==
- For-profit higher education in the United States
