= Illinois Institute of Art – Chicago =

Former for-profit art school as part of The Art Institutes

The Illinois Institute of Art – Chicago
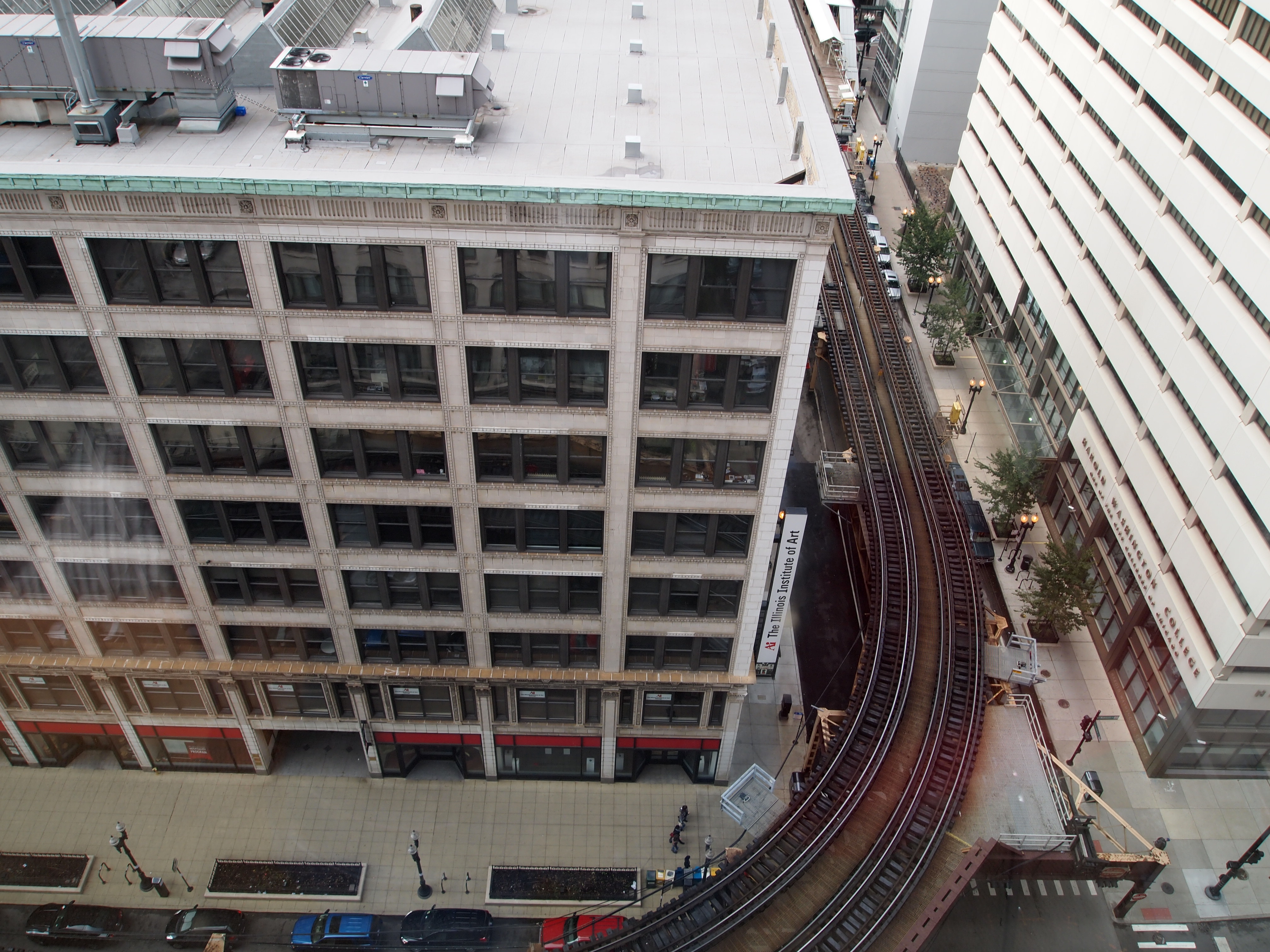
- Illinois Institute of Art building
- Motto: The College for Creative Minds
- Active: 1916–2018
- Affiliations: Dream Center Education Holdings (DCEH), LLC
- President: Jennifer Raney
- Location: Chicago, Illinois, United States
- Campus: Urban
- Colors: Black and Red
- Nickname: ILIA
- Website: www.artinstitutes.edu/chicago

Illinois Institute of Art – Chicago was a for-profit art and culinary school in Chicago, Illinois. It briefly operated as a non-profit institution before it closed in 2018. The school was one of a number of Art Institutes, a franchise of for-profit art colleges with many branches in North America, owned and operated by Education Management Corporation. EDMC owned the college from 1995 until 2017, when, facing significant financial problems and declining enrollment, the company sold the Illinois Institute of Art – Chicago, along with 30 other Art Institute schools, to Dream Center Education, a Los Angeles–based Pentecostal organization.

Dream Center permanently closed 18 Art Institute schools, including the Illinois Institute of Art – Chicago, at the end of 2018.

== History ==
The Illinois Institute of Art – Chicago was founded in 1916 as The Commercial Art School, which was one of the first applied art and design colleges in the United States. Three years later, William F. Ray became president and incorporated the school under the name of Ray School.

During the 1920s and 1930s, the school's enrollment increased substantially as professional art, design photography, and fashion programs were added to the curriculum. In the 1930s, the name "Vogue School" was used during an advertising campaign for fashion courses offered by the school; thus, the school became widely known as Ray–Vogue School. When Ruth Wade Ray assumed the presidency in 1945, Ray-Vogue had become recognized throughout the country as a leader in professional art and fashion education. The college was renamed Ray College of Design in 1981 and was granted the authority to award associate degrees in all of its programs.

In 1985, the president of the college, Wade Ray, opened a branch campus near Woodfield Mall in Schaumburg, which later became The Illinois Institute of Art—Schaumburg. One year later, the college was granted authority to award Bachelor of Arts degrees by the Illinois Board of Higher Education. Ray College of Design joined The Art Institutes system in 1995 as The Illinois Institute of Art.

As part of The Art Institutes, The Illinois Institute of Art – Chicago refocused its bachelor's degree programs and mission to serve four basic creative industries (fashion, interior design, culinary and the media arts, which includes digital film-making, game art design, graphic design, and advertising) as a skill-centered and market-driven career college.

Since 1995, The Illinois Institute of Art – Chicago has grown by programs and floor space for its growing student body. The Illinois Institute of Art – Chicago took advantage of the expansion and renovation of the first floor of the West Mart Center (350 N. Orleans) of the Merchandise Mart Center and Apparel Center complex. Most of the new floor space was shared and occupied by the Illinois Institute of Art and by Argosy University.

In 2007, new class space opened on a newly acquired fifth floor at the Loop campus. By the end of the 2007 school year, the college successfully expanded its floor space at both the Mart Center campus and the Loop campus, and discontinued its use of temporary spaces.

In late 2007, The Art Institute of Michigan serving the Detroit metropolitan area became a branch location of The Illinois Institute of Art – Chicago. Also, progression was made to include officially The Art Institute locations at Schaumburg and Cincinnati as branch locations under the umbrella of The Illinois Institute of Art – Chicago.

The Illinois Institute of Art – Chicago achieved regional re-accreditation by The Higher Learning Commission for the North Central Association of Colleges and Schools for ten years in 2008. The interior design program was re-certified by the Council of Interior Design Accreditation a few months earlier. Also, in June, 2008, Argosy University moved out of the spaces at the Mart Center Campus allowing The Illinois Institute of Art – Chicago to grow its programs that serve the fashion and the interior design industries further there.

Full-time enrollment fell from 2,250 students in 2009 to 970 in 2016. The school closed two years later.

== Accreditation ==
Although the Illinois Institute of Art – Chicago was a candidate for accreditation by the Higher Learning Commission (HLC), in 2015 HLC placed the institute "On Notice." The Interior Design BFA program was accredited by the Council for Interior Design Accreditation (CIDA). The Culinary Arts AAS program was accredited by the Accrediting Commission of the American Culinary Federation. In 2018, The Illinois Institute of Art – Chicago lost their HLC accreditation by going from "Accredited" to "Candidate" following the Education Management Corporations sale to the Dream Center Foundation through Dream Center Education Holdings.

The Illinois Institute of Art – Chicago was authorized by the Illinois Board of Higher Education to award the following: the Bachelor of Fine Arts Degrees: Digital Media Production, Fashion Design, Game Art & Design, Interior Design, Media Arts & Animation, Interactive Media Design, Digital Photography, Visual Communications and Visual Effects & Motion Graphics; the Bachelor of Arts Degrees: Fashion Marketing & iManagement; Advertising; and the Bachelor of Applied Science Degree in Culinary Management; Associate of Applied Science Degrees: Culinary Arts, Fashion Merchandising, Interactive Media Production and Graphic Design.
