= Art Institute of Las Vegas =

Former for-profit art school as part of The Art Institutes

The Art Institute of Las Vegas
- Type: For-profit college
- Active: 1983–2019
- Location: Henderson, Nevada, United States; 36.024578°N 115.090305°W
- Website: artinstitutes.edu/las-vegas

The Art Institute of Las Vegas was a for-profit college in Henderson, Nevada. It was founded in 1983 as The Interior Design Institute and was later known as The Design Institute. It was renamed The Art Institute of Las Vegas in 2001 when it was purchased by Education Management Corporation, which was headquartered in Pittsburgh, Pennsylvania. Ai-Las Vegas was part of a system of Art Institutes schools. It was one of the colleges acquired from EDMC by Dream Center Education Holdings (DCEH), LLC, in 2017. It closed in December 2019.

== Academics ==
Although The Art Institute of Las Vegas was accredited by the Accrediting Council for Independent Colleges and Schools (ACICS) to award certificates, associate degrees, and bachelor's degrees. In January 2019, ACICS sent a letter to Ai Las Vegas asking the school to show cause for why it should not take away its accreditation. The institution was also under heightened cash monitoring by the US Department of Education.

According to the National Center for Education Statistics, the Art Institute of Las Vegas had an 18% graduation rate and an 18% default rate.

== Sale and closure ==
On March 7, 2019, the Art Institute of Las Vegas was sold, allowing it to stay open unlike the other Art Institute colleges that are closing, and is taking transfers from other Art Institute schools. The International Culinary School at The Art Institute of Las Vegas (formerly the Culinary Institute of Las Vegas) was a division of The Art Institute of Las Vegas.

The school's accreditation was threatened in January 2019. The Nevada Department of Employment, Training and Rehabilitation moved to suspend the school's license to operate in July but gave the school permission to continue operating if it could address its deficiencies by February 2020 on the condition that the school (a) stop admitting new students and (b) notify students of its troubles. In October, the department learned that the school had continued to admit new students and the department suspended the school's license. Although some faculty were working to save the institution, it closed in December 2019.
