= Art Institute of Jacksonville =

Former for-profit art school as part of The Art Institutes

Coordinates: 30.2316°N 81.5794°W

The Art Institute of Jacksonville
- Type: Private, for-profit
- Active: 2007–2015
- Affiliations: The Art Institutes; EDMC; ACF; ACICS
- Location: Jacksonville, Florida, U.S.
- Colors: Red and Black
- Website: www.artinstitutes.edu/jacksonville/

The Art Institute of Jacksonville was a for-profit institution of higher education in Jacksonville, Florida, and one of The Art Institutes, a corporate system of over 40 educational institutions throughout North America, providing education in design, media arts, fashion and culinary arts. The school opened in 2007 as a branch of the Miami International University of Art & Design.

The Art Institute of Jacksonville is accredited by the Commission on Colleges of the Southern Association of Colleges and Schools. The school started offering culinary programs in July 2007.

The Art Institutes system is a subsidiary of Education Management Corporation a for-profit college organization. Beginning in August 2011, Education Management Corporation was one of several for-profit college companies to be investigated and sued by federal and state agencies for illegal recruitment practices and fraudulent receipt of federal financial aid money.

In 2015, the Art Institute of Jacksonville announced it would close along with 14 other Art Institutes branches in the aftermath of the federal investigations. The school ceased admitting new students and closed when its enrolled students had graduated.
