= Illinois Institute of Art – Schaumburg =

Former for-profit art school as part of The Art Institutes

The Illinois Institute of Art – Schaumburg
- Type: For-profit art school
- Active: 1983–2018
- Location: Schaumburg, Illinois, United States; 42.0482°N 88.0440°W
- Website: www.artinstitutes.edu/schaumburg

Illinois Institute of Art – Schaumburg was a for-profit art school in Schaumburg, Illinois. The school was one of a number of Art Institutes, a franchise of for-profit art colleges with many branches in North America, owned and operated by Education Management Corporation. EDMC owned the college from 1999 until 2017, when, facing significant financial problems and declining enrollment, the company sold the Illinois Institute of Art – Schaumburg, along with 30 other Art Institute schools, to Dream Center Education, a Los Angeles-based Pentecostal organization. Dream Center permanently closed the Schaumburg campus location at the end of 2018.

== History ==
Founded in 1916 as The Commercial Art School, the college became widely known in the 1930s as Ray-Vogue School and was renamed Ray College of Design in 1981. The school grew to include the Schaumburg location in 1983 and in 1995, the college joined The Art Institutes system of schools, taking a different name in order to respect the trademarks of the School of the Art Institute of Chicago.
