= The Art Institutes =

Collection of for-profit art schools

- The Art Institutes logo
- Motto: The hardest thing you'll ever love.
- Type: Private for-profit system of art schools
- Active: 1969–2023
- Parent institution: Education Principle Foundation
- Location: Atlanta, Georgia, United States
- Website: www.artinstitutes.edu

The Art Institutes (AI) were a private for-profit system of art schools in the United States.

The Art Institutes offered programs at the certificate, associate's, bachelors, and master's levels. Areas of study included graphic design, media arts and animation, culinary arts, photography, digital filmmaking, interior design, audio production, fashion design, and game art and design. By 2012, there were 50 campuses with roughly 80,000 enrolled students. Long owned by Education Management Corporation (EDMC), the Art Institutes were sold in 2017 to the Dream Center Foundation, a Los Angeles–based Pentecostal organization. From 2019 to 2023, the Art Institutes were owned by the Education Principle Foundation (formerly known as Colbeck Foundation), a non-profit that also owned South University. In 2022, South University separated from the Education Principle Foundation and, by extension, the Art Institutes.

The Art Institutes faced accreditation and legal issues, and student loan debtors have appealed to the US Department of Education for debt cancellation through defense to repayment claims. These efforts are premised on allegations they were defrauded. The student debt group "I Am Ai" has acted as a support group for students and former students of the Art Institutes, offering advice about debt cancellation.

All remaining Art Institute schools closed on September 30, 2023. The announcement was made less than a week prior to the closure, providing little warning to the Art Institutes' 1,700 remaining students.

== History ==
=== Origins and growth (1969–2010) ===
The Art Institutes system was created in 1969 when Education Management Corporation (EDMC) acquired The Art Institute of Pittsburgh, which was founded in 1921. Starting in 2000, The Art Institutes launched its distance education program, Art Institute Online, to allow students to work towards bachelor's degrees in graphic design and certificates in digital web design online. At that time, on-site bachelor's degrees were offered at 17 or 21 Institutes of which 30% of the students were enrolled. The Art Institutes expanded through the acquisition of existing art colleges and the establishment of new Art Institutes. In 2001, there were around 20 campuses of The Art Institutes; this grew to approximately 30 locations in 2006 when the school's parent company was acquired by Goldman Sachs, Providence Equity Partners, and Leeds Equity Partners. In 2009, EDMC became a publicly traded corporation, reaching 50 Art Institutes by 2012.

=== Scandal, decline, and closure (2011–2023) ===
In 2011, Frontline released a documentary titled Educating Sergeant Pantzke. In the documentary, Iraq war veteran Chris Pantzke discussed the lack of disability services at the school. According to Pantzke, "Being a soldier, you don't want to quit, you don't want to give up or fail." After doing his own research, Pantzke concluded that the degree he was pursuing wasn't "worth much more than the paper is worth," and felt he was "throwing away taxpayer money" by using GI Bill funds.

In 2012, The Art Institute schools began to experience a decrease in the number of new students enrolling, seeing enrollment numbers drop by approximately 20 percent between the second quarter of the 2012 fiscal year and the start of 2013. EDMC attributed the drop in enrollment to limited access to Parent Loan for Undergraduate Students and the economic recession. In February 2013, EDMC announced plans for a three-year-old tuition freeze at The Art Institutes. Under this plan, the company pledged to maintain the current cost of tuition through 2015.

In June 2013, EDMC announced that its President John Mazzoni would resign effective July 14, 2013, after 27 years at the organization. Charles Restivo, Group Vice President, became the Interim President of The Art Institutes. In 2014, the US Department of Education reported that ten EDMC campuses, including several Art Institutes, were placed under heightened cash monitoring. The Art Institute of Pittsburgh was one of the schools listed.

In 2014, an investigation by the City Attorney of San Francisco's office led to a $4.4 million settlement. The city claimed AI used deceptive marketing tactics resulting in underestimated program costs for students and inflated job placement figures for graduates.

In May 2015, EDMC announced that it was closing 15 of the Art Institute locations, affecting over 5,400 students." Campuses slated to close included those in Atlanta, New York City, Ohio, Texas and Pennsylvania. In January 2016, EDMC announced that additional Art Institutes were ceasing enrollments. These campuses are The Art Institute of California – Los Angeles, The Art Institute of St. Louis, and the Art Institute of Tucson. At least 200 additional employees were laid off in May 2016. In June 2016, EDMC announced that the Art Institutes International Minnesota were ceasing enrollments, bringing the total of campuses scheduled to close to 19.

In June 2016, Tim Moscato, chief operating officer at the Art Institutes, resigned amid more downsizing. The same month, the US Department of Education voted to end Accrediting Council for Independent Colleges and Schools (ACICS) power to accredit. ACICS was stripped of its power to accredit in September. As of June 1, 2016, twelve Art Institute campuses were under heightened cash monitoring (or HCM1) by the US Department of Education because colleges are required to hold a certain amount of money to meet obligations in case the school closes prematurely. Campuses affected were Pittsburgh, Portland, Philadelphia, Atlanta, Fort Lauderdale, Minnesota, Colorado, Houston, Seattle, New York City, York, and Phoenix. In December 2016, nine additional Art Institutes (The Art Institute of Atlanta, The Art Institute of Houston, Miami International University of Art and Design) and their branch campuses in Charleston, Nashville, Arlington, Virginia Beach, Austin and San Antonio were placed on probation by their accreditor, Southern Association of Colleges and Schools (SACS).

In January 2018, Art Institutes locations in Novi, Michigan and Denver and the Illinois Institute of Art locations in Chicago and Schaumburg lost their accreditation with the Higher Learning Commission. They did not inform students about the loss of accreditation until June despite being required to disclose this at the time of the loss. In 2018, Dream Center Education Holdings reported that more AI campuses were closing. In December 2018, 23 Art Institutes were closed.

In January 2019, The Washington Student Achievement Council suspended AI-Seattle's license to operate, which blocks enrollment of new students. The council said it would reinstate the license when Dream Center Education Holdings showed that it had "regained financial solvency or completed a viable reorganization." AI Las Vegas also received a show cause notice from ACICS requesting that the school provide information showing why it should not lose its accreditation.

In 2019, reports from DCEH's monitor, Marc Dottore, indicated that $9–13 million of federal funds, meant for students stipends, was missing. According to the Pittsburgh Post-Gazette, the monitor is "nearly out of cash to manage the entities he's tasked to oversee." Dottore has written to the Department of Education that Studio Enterprise, a company designated to service former and current DCEH schools, is taking service fees from the deal without providing any services, draining badly needed cash from the operation. Information about the Education Principle Foundation is limited, but it appears to be formerly known as the Colbeck Foundation. According to the Republic Report, the Colbeck Foundation has ties to Studio Enterprise.

In February 2019, a federal court-appointed receiver halted Dream Center Education Holdings' plans to close the Art Institute of Pittsburgh on March 31, 2019.

In March 2019, teachers and other staff had not been paid their final pay checks. As many as 13 Art Institute campuses remained open in 2019, with the remaining schools facing financial struggles.

In 2022, the Art Institute was one of 153 institutions included in student loan cancellation due to alleged fraud. The class action was brought by a group of more than 200,000 student borrowers, assisted by the Project on Predatory Student Lending, part of the Legal Services Center of Harvard Law School. A settlement was approved in August 2022, stating that the schools on the list were included "substantial misconduct by the listed schools, whether credibly alleged or in some instances proven." In April 2023, the Supreme Court rejected a challenge to the settlement and allowed to proceed the debt cancellation due to alleged fraud.

In September 2023, the institution's website was updated to say that all Art Institute schools would close on September 30, 2023.

On May 1, 2024, President Joe Biden canceled $6.1 billion in federal student debt owed by 317,000 former Art Institutes students. The U.S. Department of Education said it would notify eligible borrowers and refund previous payments on the affected student loans.

== Ownership changes ==
The Art Institutes' former parent company, Education Management Corporation (EDMC), was headquartered in Pittsburgh, Pennsylvania.

EDMC's initial public offering (IPO) was in 2009. Todd S. Nelson, who was previously the CEO of Apollo Education Group, became an EDMC board member in 2007 and the chairman of the board of directors in 2012.

In November 2014, EDMC was delisted from the NASDAQ amid financial difficulties, lawsuits, and investigations and its stock was valued at less than one cent per share.

In 2017, Education Management Corporation reported that it had sold the existing Art Institutes to The Dream Center Foundation, a Los Angeles–based Pentecostal organization. The sale was complete in October 2017. In July 2017, an accrediting agency, Middle States Association, rejected the sale of the Pittsburgh and Philadelphia Art Institutes to the Dream Center Foundation.

In January 2019, DCEH chairman Randall Barton stated that the Art Institutes, excluding the Art Institute of Pittsburgh, Art Institute of Las Vegas and Argosy University campuses, have been transferred to the Education Principle Foundation. Also in January 2019, Dream Center Education Holdings announced that AI schools, excluding AI Pittsburgh, AI Las Vegas, and Argosy campuses, had been transferred to the Education Principle Foundation with help from the US Department of Education. Inside Higher Ed described Education Principle Foundation as "a Delaware nonprofit with no annual budget and almost no internet presence", and linked it to private equity firm Colbeck Capital Management. Studio Enterprise, a Los Angeles company tied to Colbeck Capital Management, was also involved in the ownership transfer.

Art Institute students from closed schools were directed to DCEH's partner institutions and other for-profit colleges: DeVry University, Walden University, and Trident University.

According to the Republic Report, the court appointed receiver, Studio Enterprise & South University had until April 11, 2019, to negotiate to separate both South University schools and the remaining Art Institute schools from the Dream Center Education IT Platform by September 11, 2019. "Should they fail to agree, the plan of reorganization will likely fail, thereby dooming South University and the Art Institutes".

== Locations that closed on September 30, 2023 ==
- Art Institute of Atlanta (586 students)
  - Art Institute of Virginia Beach (122 students)
- Art Institute of Houston (386 students)
  - Art Institute of Austin (130 students)
  - Art Institute of San Antonio (249 students)
- Miami International University of Art & Design (934 students)
  - Art Institute of Dallas (331 students)
  - Art Institute of Tampa (211 students)

== Closed or sold campuses ==
- The Art Institute of Atlanta – Decatur
- The Art Institute of Austin
- The Art Institute of Austin - Bastrop
- The Art Institute of California – Hollywood
- The Art Institute of California – Inland Empire
- The Art Institute of California – Los Angeles
- The Art Institute of California – Orange County
- The Art Institute of California – San Diego
- The Art Institute of California – San Francisco
- The Art Institute of California – Sacramento
- The Art Institute of California – Silicon Valley
- The Art Institute of Charlotte
- The Art Institute of Charleston - South Carolina
- The Art Institute of Colorado
- The Art Institute of Fort Lauderdale
- The Art Institute of Indianapolis
- The Art Institutes International Minnesota
- The Art Institute of Las Vegas
- The Art Institute of Michigan
- The Art Institute of Philadelphia
- The Art Institute of Phoenix
- The Art Institute of Pittsburgh
- The Art Institute of Pittsburgh – Online Division
- The Art Institute of Portland
- The Art Institute of Raleigh–Durham
- The Art Institute of San Antonio
- The Art Institute of St. Louis
- The Art Institute of Seattle
- The Art Institute of Salt Lake City
- The Art Institute of Tennessee – Nashville
- The Art Institute of Toronto
- The Art Institute of Tucson
- The Art Institutes of Wisconsin
- The Art Institute of Fort Worth
- The Art Institute of Houston—North
- The Art Institutes International – Kansas City
- The Art Institute of Jacksonville
- The Art Institute of Michigan – Troy
- The Art Institute of New York City
- The Art Institute of Ohio – Cincinnati
- The Art Institute of Vancouver
- The Art Institute of Washington – Dulles
- The Art Institute of Washington
- The Art Institute of York – Pennsylvania
- Illinois Institute of Art – Chicago
- Illinois Institute of Art – Schaumburg
- Illinois Institute of Art – Tinley Park
- New England Institute of Art

== Litigation ==
Between 2000 and 2018, the Art Institutes parent company EDMC was subject to numerous lawsuits from former students, former faculty, and government agencies. Thousands of former students of the Art Institutes claim they have been deceived and misled by the schools and their recruiters and have filed claims with the US Department of Education. Art Institute students are able to file defense to repayment claims with the US Department of Education.

In October 2000, EDMC announced the settlement of a lawsuit brought by a group of approximately 350 former students of The Art Institute of Houston.

From 2011 to 2015, EDMC was involved in a United States Department of Justice investigation and lawsuit alleging both illegal recruitment practices by EDMC schools, including The Art Institutes, and fraudulent receipt of $11 billion in federal and state financial aid money. A 2011 US DOJ report claimed EDMC "created a 'boiler room' style sales culture and has made recruiting and enrolling new students the sole focus of its compensation system."

In May 2013, a federal judge in Pennsylvania rejected a bid to dismiss a lawsuit against EDMC by a former EDMC employee. The lawsuit alleges that the corporation and its affiliates engaged in a scheme to maximize profits from financial aid programs administered by the U.S. Department of Education. The complainant in the case, Jason Sobek, who worked as an admissions director for EDMC in Pittsburgh from June 2008 through November 2010, alleges that the firm falsified information given to the Department of Education that indicated they were in compliance with the loan programs' eligibility requirements. In testimony that provided the basis for the lower court's decision last October, Sobek alleged that EDMC operated a "carefully crafted and widespread for-profit education scheme [in which] defendants have defrauded the United States and its taxpayers out of millions of dollars in the form of federally backed student loans and grants."

In November 2015, EDMC agreed to pay $95.5 million to settle claims of illegal recruiting, and consumer fraud.

In April 2016, two former AI teachers filed suit in Alameda City Superior Court claiming EDMC did not pay them a minimum wage or provide adequate rest periods, in order "to reduce compensation and increase its own profits." On September 8, 2016, Art Institutes students known as "I Am Ai" presented a notice to the Director of New England Institute of Art (NEIA) about a lawsuit that would be coming in 30 days. The lawsuit is being written by the Legal Services Center of Harvard Law School. On September 24, 2016, the Attorney General of Massachusetts expressed concern that the teaching duties at NEIA were being taken over by an unlicensed Indian company with no background in teaching US art students. The AG's Office stated that if a proper education for NEIA students could not be ensured, that NEIA should shut down at the end of the 2016. In December 2016, nine additional Art Institutes were placed on probation by their accreditor, Southern Association of Colleges and Schools (SACS).

On July 6, 2017, two former Art Institute students filed a lawsuit against Secretary of Education Betsy DeVos for illegally delaying rules intended to protect borrowers' rights. They were represented by the Project on Predatory Student Lending and Public Citizen in two lawsuits. This lawsuit helped clear the way for 2016 Borrower Defense Rule to take effect.

In 2018, Dream Center Education Holdings took control of the remaining 31 Art Institutes schools. In December 2018, Art Institute students filed a lawsuit in the Circuit Court of Cook County, claiming that Dream Center Educational Holdings failed to notify students it had lost institutional accreditation at four Illinois AI campuses.

== Student outcomes ==
According to the College Scorecard, the Art Institute of Atlanta had a 20 percent graduation rate, a median student loan debt ranging from $16,500 (Culinary Arts) to $42,549 (AV Communication Technologies), and a median salary after attending of $19,000 (BFA) to $35,000 (BS in Computer Software). Two years after entering repayment, 9 percent were making progress in their student loans.

== Notable alumni ==
The Art Institute of California – San Francisco

- Simone Fattal, artist

The Art Institute of Fort Lauderdale

- Serena Williams, former professional tennis player

The Art Institute of Houston

- Scott Cawthon, creator of the Five Nights at Freddy's media franchise

The Art Institute of Philadelphia

- Zerina Akers, fashion stylist and costume designer
- Kyle A. Carrozza, animator
- Jessica Delfino, comedian, writer, and musician
- Dave Hoover (1955–2011), comics artist and animator
- Isis King, model, actress and fashion designer
- Jacob Kulick, recording artist
- Stephen Powers, muralist

The Art Institute of Phoenix

- Bill Hader, actor and comedian
- Brother Luck, chef
- Vertexguy, artist and video game composer

Multiple Art Institutes schools

- Ernesto Padilla, graphic designer and cigar maker
