= Art Institute of York – Pennsylvania =

Former for-profit art school as part of The Art Institutes

Coordinates: 39.9923°N 76.6636°W

The Art Institute of York – Pennsylvania
- Former names: York Academy of Arts; Bradley Academy for the Visual Arts
- Type: for-profit college
- Active: 1952–2017
- President: Tim Howard
- Students: 293 (May 2015)
- Location: Springettsbury Township, Pennsylvania, U.S.
- Website: www.artinstitutes.edu/york

The Art Institute of York – Pennsylvania was a for-profit college, part of The Art Institutes, a system of over 35 education institutions throughout North America, providing education in design, media arts, fashion and culinary arts. Founded in 1952 as the York Academy of Arts, it was located in Springettsbury Township and closed in 2017.

== History ==
Founded in 1952 as the York Academy of Arts and renamed in 1988 as the Bradley Academy for the Visual Arts, the school joined the Art Institutes system in 2003 and became The Art Institute of York – Pennsylvania on October 29, 2007. In August 2009, the Art Institute of York started its bachelor's degree programs after becoming an accredited college. Associate of Science programs were also available.

Located since 1988 in Springettsbury Township, just east of York, Pennsylvania, The Art Institute of York – Pennsylvania was accredited by the Accrediting Council for Independent Colleges and Schools.

== Operations and closure ==
The Art Institutes system is a subsidiary of Education Management Corporation (EDMC), which is headquartered in Pittsburgh. EDMC has been the subject of several lawsuits and investigations alleging that the company made misleading claims in its efforts to recruit students; the company agreed to pay nearly $96 million, and change its student recruitment methods, to settle the civil claims. Its CEO resigned in August 2015.

In May 2015, EDMC announced plans to close 15 of its Art Institutes campuses over the following two or three years, including the one in York with approximately 300 students, saying they would no longer accept new enrollments. The school's 2015–2016 student handbook and catalog included a statement that read, "Effective May 6, 2015, The Art Institute of York—Pennsylvania is no longer enrolling new students." Ten of the school's 90 employees, most of them assigned to the admissions office, were released in May 2015.

The Art Institute of York closed after holding its last day of instruction on September 23, 2017.
