= Art Institute of Atlanta =

Defunct private art school in Georgia, US

Coordinates: 33°56′9″N 84°21′20″W

The Art Institute of Atlanta
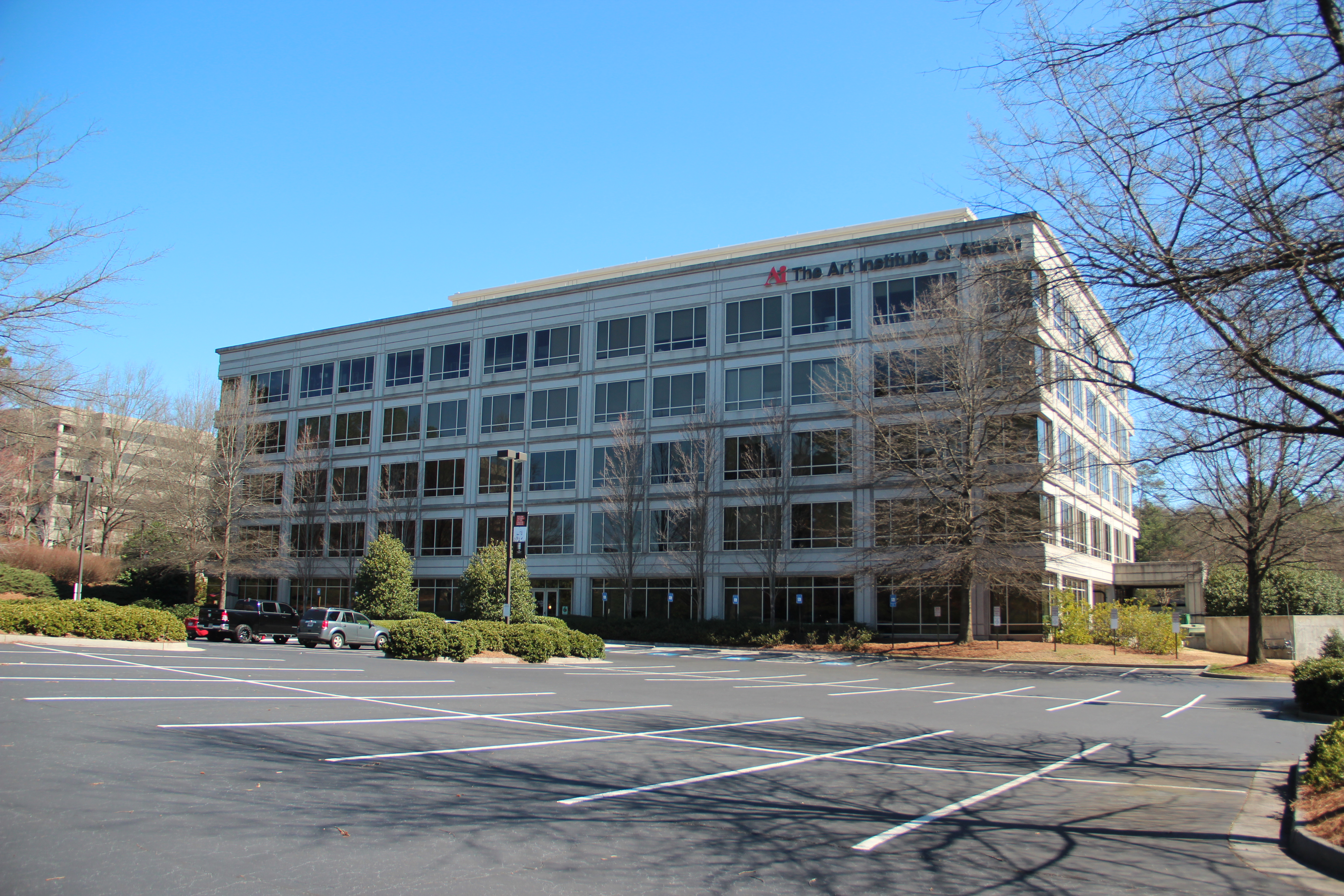
- Type: Private for-profit art school
- Established: 1949
- Location: Atlanta, Georgia, United States
- Website: www.artinstitutes.edu/atlanta/

The Art Institute of Atlanta was a private for-profit art school in Atlanta, Georgia. It was owned by the Education Principle Foundation. The school was part of the Art Institutes chain of art schools. It awarded associate and bachelor's degrees, including Bachelor of Fine Arts (BFA) degrees, Bachelor of Arts (BA) degrees, and Bachelor of Science (BS) degrees, and also offered diploma and non-degree programs. The school closed along with all Art Institute schools in September 2023.

== History ==
The Art Institute of Atlanta was founded in 1949 as Massey Business College, with diploma programs in basic business and secretarial skills. The school added liberal arts, fashion, and interior design during the next two decades.

In 1975, the school was acquired by Education Management Corporation (EDMC) and was renamed The Art Institute of Atlanta. The college also shifted its focus to a creative applied arts curriculum. Located at 6600 Peachtree Dunwoody Road N.E., 100 Embassy Row, Atlanta, GA 30328 (the 5-story building was torn down around 2004.) Accreditation by the Commission on Colleges of the Southern Association of Colleges and Schools soon followed in 1986.

In 1999, the college moved to its current location; a 5-story building in Sandy Springs and later expanded to a second building across the street. In 2004, the school added Audio Production to their growing list of programs. The newest program, Fashion & Retail Management, was added in January 2007. Student enrollment peaked by 2012.

In 2017, EDMC, struggling financially, sold the Art Institute of Atlanta and 30 other Art Institute schools to Dream Center Education, a Los Angeles-based Pentecostal organization. By 2019–2020, Ai-Atlanta's enrollment had declined to 814.

View source data.

On September 25, 2023, the Art Institutes network publicly announced the closure of its Atlanta campus along with seven other campuses throughout the United States.

== Branches (closed) ==
Several Art Institutes schools were branches of the Art Institute of Atlanta. These branches are now closed.

- The Art Institute of Tennessee – Nashville
- The Art Institute of Washington
- The Art Institute of Charleston
