= Art Institute of Dallas =

For-profit art school of Miami International University of Art & Design

Coordinates: 32.8710°N 96.7678°W

The Art Institute of Dallas
- Type: Private for-profit art school
- Established: 1964
- President: Lindsey Oliger
- Students: 850
- Location: Dallas, Texas, United States
- Campus: Urban
- Colors: Red, Black and White
- Website: Official website

The Art Institute of Dallas in Dallas, Texas, United States, was a private for-profit art school owned and operated by Miami International University of Art & Design. The Art Institute of Dallas offered associate degree and bachelor's degree programs for fashion design, fashion marketing management, interior design, graphic design, media arts & animation, advertising design, baking & pastry, photography, web design & interactive media, digital filmmaking & video production, audio production, and culinary arts. All Art Institute schools closed permanently on September 30, 2023.

== History ==
The Art Institute of Dallas was established in 1964 as the Dallas Fashion Merchandising College. It was later renamed in 1978 to the Fashion and Art Institute of Dallas. A year later, the Institute was approved to grant an Associate of Applied Arts Degree. In 1984, the Institute was acquired by the Education Management Corporation (EDMC) to join The Art Institutes, and now bears its current name The Art Institute of Dallas. EDMC expanded The Art Institutes by investing in facilities and equipment, adding personnel to faculty and student services, and establishing a national marketing presence. In 1988, The Art Institute of Dallas left its European Crossroads campus and moved to a new North Dallas campus at Park Lane and Central Expressway where it remained until it closed in September of 2023.

On October 18, 2017 EDMC announced it completed the sale of 31 Art Institute Schools, including The Art Institute of Dallas, to the Dream Center Foundation. Subsequently, ownership passed to Miami International University of Art & Design. The school closed on September 30, 2023.
