= Art Institute of New York City =

Former for-profit art school as part of The Art Institutes

Coordinates: 40°43′13.75″N 74°0′21.9″W

The Art Institute of New York City
- Type: For-profit college
- Active: 1980–2017
- President: Jennifer Ramey
- Faculty: 100+
- Students: 1,000+ Undergraduate
- Location: New York, New York, United States
- Website: www.artinstitutes.edu/newyork

The Art Institute of New York City was a for-profit college in New York City. The school was one of a number of Art Institutes, a franchise of for-profit art colleges with many branches in North America, owned and operated by Education Management Corporation. Founded in 1980 as The New York Restaurant School, and renamed in 2001, it was accredited by the Accrediting Council for Independent Colleges and Schools.

The Art Institute of New York City officially closed in 2017.
