= List of Delta Lambda Phi chapters =

Delta Lambda Phi is a social fraternity for gay, bisexual, transgender, and progressive men. Delta Lambda Phi has three types of chapters: campus-based, multi-campus based, and community-based. Its chapters are assigned a sequential Greek letter designation according to the order in which they were chartered.

In the following list of chapters, active chapters are indicated in bold and inactive chapters are in italics.

| Chapter | Charter date and range | Institution or area served | Location | Status | Ref. |
|---|---|---|---|---|---|
| Alpha (Prime) | April 10, 1987 – xxxx ? | Washington, D.C. metropolitan area | Washington, D.C. | Active | |
| Beta | April 1988– xxxx ?; 2007– 2020 | University of California, Los Angeles | Los Angeles, California | Inactive | (Note: After going dormant, Beta was re-established as a colony in 2007.) |
| Gamma | 1988– xxxx ?; 2007–20xx ? | University of California, San Diego | San Diego, California | Inactive | |
| Delta | September 1988–xxxx ?; April 29, 2012 – 2019 | University of Minnesota | Minneapolis, Minnesota | Inactive | |
| Epsilon | 198x ?–199x ? | University of Maryland, College Park | College Park, Maryland | Inactive | |
| Zeta | 198x ?–1998, 2001-20xx ? | San Francisco Metropolitan Area | San Francisco, California | Inactive | |
| **Eta** | 1989–xxxx ? | University of Houston | Houston, Texas | Colony | |
| Theta | | | | Inactive | |
| **Iota** | 1989–19xx ?; 2014 | California State University, Sacramento | Sacramento, California | Active | |
| Kappa | 1989–xxxx ? | Florida State University | Tallahassee, Florida | Inactive | |
| Lambda | 1990–199x ? | University of California, Berkeley | Berkeley, California | Inactive | (Note: Chapter closed after gay protesters accused the fraternity of "selling out to heterosexism", noting that fraternity system is inherently gay.) |
| Mu (First) | February 13, 1990 – 19xx ? | Las Vegas area | Las Vegas, Nevada | Inactive | |
| Mu (Second) | 19xx ?–xxxx ? | University of Nevada, Las Vegas | Paradise, Nevada | Inactive | |
| Nu | 199x ?–1992 | San Francisco State University | San Francisco, California | Inactive | (Note: Reformed as a colony in 2015.) |
| Xi | April 1, 1990 – xxxx ?; 2008–20xx ?; 2013–20xx ? | University of California, Davis | Davis, California | Inactive | |
| Omicron | 199x ?–xxxx ? | San Jose State University | San Jose, California | Inactive | (Note: Reformed as a colony in 2005.) |
| Rho | February 1991–20xx ? | California State University, Long Beach | Long Beach, California | Inactive | |
| Sigma | | | | Inactive | |
| Tau | | | | Inactive | |
| Upsilon | | | | Inactive | |
| Phi | | | | Inactive | |
| Phi ? | May 1991–xxxx ?; 2007–20xx ? | University of Wisconsin–Madison | Madison, Wisconsin | Inactive | (Note: Chapter was reformed as a colony in 2007.) |
| Chi | September 1991–20xx ?, 2013–2021 | Michigan State University | East Lansing, Michigan | Inactive | |
| **Psi** | 199x ?–199x ?; 1999 | University of Washington | Seattle, Washington | Active | |
| **Omega** | December 1991–xxxx ?; September 2, 2006 | University of Arizona | Tucson, Arizona | Active | (Note: After going dormant, the chapter reformed from Sigma Phi Beta (local), established in 2005.) |
| Alpha Alpha | 1992–xxxx ?, Fall 2006–20xx ? | Arizona State University | Tempe, Arizona | Inactive | |
| Alpha Beta | 1991–199x ?, 1998–xxxx ? | Purdue University | West Lafayette, Indiana | Inactive | |
| Alpha Gamma | 1992–xxxx ? | Boise State University | Boise, Idaho | Inactive | |
| Alpha Delta | 1992–2020 | San Diego area | San Diego, California | Inactive | (Note: Chapter formed at San Diego State University. In 1999, it became a multi-campus chapter for the San Diego area, including the Art Institute of California – San Diego, Grossmont College, Mesa College, San Diego City College, San Diego State University, Southwestern College, the University of California, San Diego, and the University of San Diego.) |
| Alpha Epsilon | 19xx ?–19xx?, 1997–xxxx ? | Baltimore metropolitan area | Baltimore, Maryland | Inactive | |
| Alpha Zeta | September 1993–xxxx ? | Ball State University | Muncie, Indiana | Inactive | |
| Alpha Eta | 1995–xxxx ? | Cornell University | Ithaca, New York | Inactive | (Note: Chapter reformed as a colony around 2008.) |
| Alpha Theta | 1995–xxxx ? | Middle Tennessee State University | Murfreesboro, Tennessee | Inactive | |
| Alpha Iota | 1995–199x ? | Portland State University | Portland, Oregon | Inactive | |
| Alpha Kappa | 1995–20xx ? | Southern Methodist University | Dallas, Texas | Inactive | |
| Alpha Lambda | 1996–xxxx ? | University of Illinois Urbana-Champaign | Urbana, Illinois | Inactive | |
| Alpha Mu | 1996–xxxx ? | Eastern Michigan University | Ypsilanti, Michigan | Inactive | (Note: Chapter was chartered as the Ann Arbor and Ypsilanti Area chapter but became a multi-campus chapter sometime between 1999 and 2002.) |
| Alpha Mu | 1996–xxxx ? | University of Michigan | Ann Arbor, Michigan | Inactive | (Note: Chapter was chartered as the Ann Arbor and Ypsilanti Area chapter but became a multi-campus chapter sometime between 1999 and 2002.) |
| Alpha Mu | 1996–xxxx ? | Washtenaw Community College | Ann Arbor Charter Township, Michigan | Inactive | (Note: Chapter was chartered as the Ann Arbor and Ypsilanti Area chapter but became a multi-campus chapter sometime between 1999 and 2002.) |
| Alpha Nu | 1996–xxxx ? | Richmond metropolitan area | Richmond, Virginia | Inactive | |
| Alpha Xi | 1996–xxxx ? | University of Oregon | Eugene, Oregon | Inactive | |
| Alpha Omicron (First) | 1996 – July 22, 2005 | California State University, Northridge | Los Angeles, California | Inactive | (Note: Chapter separated from the university and became a community-based chapter in 2005.) |
| Alpha Pi | 199x ?–xxxx ? | Phoenix metropolitan area | Phoenix, Arizona | Inactive | |
| Alpha Rho | April 1998–December 2002; March 2011 | Pennsylvania State University | State College, Pennsylvania | Inactive | (Note: Chapter formed as a colony in March 1997. It initially included both Penn State and Loch Haven, Pennsylvania.) |
| Alpha Sigma | 1998–20xx ? | Ohio University | Athens, Ohio | Inactive | |
| Alpha Tau | 1998–20xx ? | University of North Texas | Denton, Texas | Inactive | |
| Alpha Upsilon | November 1998 | Western Michigan University | Kalamazoo, Michigan | Inactive | |
| Alpha Phi | xxxx ?–20xx ? | Old Dominion University | Norfolk, Virginia | Inactive | (Note: This eventually became a multi-campus chapter, serving Hampton University, Johnson & Whales, Norfolk State University, Old Dominion University, Tidewater Community College, and Virginia Wesleyan University.) |
| Alpha Chi (First) | 2001–2007 | Boston Area | Boston, Massachusetts | Inactive | (Note: Formed as a citywide colony in 1998 that included students from Boston University, the Massachusetts College of Art and Design, the New England Conservatory of Music, and Tufts University. When chartered in 2001, it also included Northeastern University, the Massachusetts Institute of Technology, and the University of Massachusetts Boston.) |
| Alpha Psi | 2001–20xx ? | Kent State University | Kent, Ohio | Inactive | |
| Alpha Omega | | | | Memorial | |
| Iota (Second) | c. 2001–20xx ? | Sacramento metropolitan area | Sacramento, California | Inactive | |
| Beta Alpha | 2001–20xx ? | North Carolina State University | Raleigh, North Carolina | Inactive | (Note: Chapter formed as a colony in 1998.) |
| **Beta Beta** | October 2000–Fall 2005 | University of South Alabama | Mobile, Alabama | Colony | (Note: Formed as a USA chapter but became a Mobile citywide chapter in 2002.) |
| Beta Gamma | 200x ?–20xx ? | Cincinnati metropolitan area | Cincinnati, Ohio | Inactive | (Note: Chapter formed as the University of Cincinnati colony in 1999.) |
| **Beta Delta** | 2003–20xx ? | Florida International University | Miami, Florida | Colony | (Note: Chapter formed in January 2003 as Gamma Lambda Mu (local) with the intent of becoming a chapter of Delta Lambda Phi. After going inactive, it reformed as an interest group (colony).) |
| Beta Epsilon | 2003–2005 | Ohio State University | Columbus, Ohio | Inactive | |
| Beta Zeta | 2004–20xx ? | Southern Illinois University Edwardsville | Edwardsville, Illinois | Inactive | (Note: Chapter formed as a colony in October 2003.) |
| Alpha Omicron (Second) | July 22, 2005 – 20xx ? | San Fernando Valley | San Fernando, California | Inactive | (Note: In 2005, the California State University, Northridge chapter separated from the university and became part of this citywide chapter.) |
| Beta Eta | 2005–20xx ? | University of Colorado Boulder | Boulder, Colorado | Inactive | |
| Beta Theta | 2005–20xx ? | University of Pennsylvania | Philadelphia, Pennsylvania | Inactive | |
| Beta Iota | October 2005–20xx ? | Syracuse University | Syracuse, New York | Inactive | (Note: Chapter formed as a colony in November 2003, serving Syracuse University and State University of New York College of Environmental Science and Forestry.) |
| Beta Kappa | December 3, 2005 – 20xx ? | University of San Francisco | San Francisco, California | Inactive | |
| Beta Lambda | April 2, 2006 – 20xx ? | Iowa State University | Ames, Iowa | Inactive | (Note: Chapter formed as a colony in December 2004.) |
| Beta Mu | May 6, 2006 – 20xx ? | Kansas State University | Manhattan, Kansas | Inactive | (Note: Chapter formed as a colony in February 2005.) |
| Beta Nu | 2007–20xx ? | Missouri University of Science and Technology | Rolla, Missouri | Inactive | |
| **Beta Xi** | 2007 | New York University | New York City, New York | Active | |
| **Beta Omicron** | 2007–20xx ? | Bowling Green State University | Bowling Green, Ohio | Colony | (Note: Chapter originally included both the University of Toledo and Bowling Green State University. After going dormant, it was re-established as a colony.) |
| Beta Pi | February 21, 2009 – 20xx ? | California Polytechnic State University, San Luis Obispo | San Luis Obispo, California | Inactive | |
| Beta Rho | 2010–20xx ? | University of Texas at Austin | Austin, Texas | Inactive | (Note: Chapter started as a colony in the summer of 2008.) |
| Beta Sigma | 2010–2021 | Rutgers University–New Brunswick | New Brunswick, New Jersey | Inactive | |
| Beta Tau | 2011–20xx ? | University of Texas at El Paso | El Paso, Texas | Inactive | |
| Beta Upsilon | February 26, 2011 – 20xx ? | University of California, Irvine | Irvine, California | Inactive | |
| Beta Phi | 201x ?–20xx ? | Nashville metropolitan area | Nashville, Tennessee | Inactive | |
| Beta Chi | 201x ?–20xx ? | University of Kansas | Lawrence, Kansas | Inactive | |
| Beta Psi | January 21, 2012 – 20xx ? | University of Central Florida | Orlando, Florida | Inactive | (Note: Started as an Orlando citywide colony in 2008 but became a UCF campus colony by 2010.) |
| Beta Omega | February 4, 2012 – 20xx ? | McGill University | Montreal, Quebec, Canada | Inactive | (Note: Chapter formed as a colony in 2009.) |
| Gamma Alpha | April 28, 2012 – 20xx ? | University of Miami | Coral Gables, Florida | Inactive | |
| Alpha Chi (Second) | October 6, 2012 – 20xx ? | Boston University | Boston, Massachusetts | Inactive | |
| Gamma Beta | 2014–20xx ? | The College of New Jersey | Ewing Township, New Jersey | Inactive | (Note: Chapter formed as a colony on February 25, 2012.) |
| **Gamma Gamma** | January 2015–2024 | University of Iowa | Iowa City, Iowa | Active | |
| Gamma Delta | June 10, 2017 – 20xx ? | Ontario Tech University | Oshawa, Ontario, Canada | Inactive | |
| Gamma Epsilon | April 29, 2017 – 20xx ? | Georgia State University | Atlanta, Georgia | Inactive | |
| Gamma Zeta | 201x ?–20xx ? | University of Missouri–Kansas City | Kansas City, Missouri | Inactive | (Note: Chapter formed as a colony in 2015.) |
| **Alpha (Second)** | 2018 | George Washington University | Washington, D.C. | Active | |
| **Gamma Eta** | 2018 | University of Louisiana at Lafayette | Lafayette, Louisiana | Active | (Note: Colony was established on February 17, 2018.) |
| **Virginia Tech colony** | | Virginia Tech | Blacksburg, Virginia | Colony | |
