= Art Institute of California – San Diego =

Former for-profit art school in San Diego, California

The Art Institute of California – San Diego
- The Art Institute of California - San Diego
- Type: For-profit
- Active: 1981–2019
- Location: San Diego, California, United States; 32.778°N 117.155°W
- Website: https://www.artinstitutes.edu/san-diego

The Art Institute of California – San Diego was a for-profit art school in San Diego, California. It was briefly operated as a non-profit institution before it closed in 2019. The school was one of a number of Art Institutes, a franchise of for-profit art colleges with many branches in North America, owned and operated by Education Management Corporation. EDMC owned the college from 2000 until 2017, when, facing significant financial problems and declining enrollment, the company sold the Art Institute of California – San Diego, along with 30 other Art Institute schools, to Dream Center Education, a Los Angeles–based Pentecostal organization. Dream Center permanently closed the San Diego campus location on March 8, 2019.
