= Glenn Johannesen =

Canadian ice hockey player (born 1962)

- Born: February 15, 1962 (age 63) North Battleford, Saskatchewan, Canada
- Height: 6 ft 2 in (188 cm)
- Weight: 220 lb (100 kg; 15 st 10 lb)
- Position: Left wing
- Shot: Right
- Played for: New York Islanders
- NHL draft: 206th overall, 1980; New York Islanders
- Playing career: 1984–1989

Glenn Johannesen (born February 15, 1962, in La Ronge, Saskatchewan, and raised in North Battleford, Saskatchewan) is a retired professional ice hockey left winger. He was a 1980 10th-round (206th overall) NHL Draft pick of the New York Islanders as a defenceman, switched to left wing, and later played in two NHL games for them in 1985. He played in college at Western Michigan University, and continued to play minor league hockey until 1989. He was known to longtime Springfield Indians fans as "Moose".

== Post-playing career ==
After his hockey career ended, Johannesen began working within proprietary education, first with ITT Technical Institutes and later art education (The Art Institutes International), and was elected the first president of The Art Institutes International Minnesota, The Art Institutes Canada and finally The Art Institute of Tampa in 2003 after having previously worked for Art Institutes International and The Art Institute of Fort Lauderdale.

Johannesen resigned his position with the Art Institute of Tampa in October 2009 to accept the position of President at Potomac College, a business and technology college, located in northwest Washington, D.C., in November 2009. Potomac College was placed on probation by The Middle States Commission on Higher Education while shortly after Johannesen joined Potomac College as a result of reports and practices within Potomac prior to Johannesen joining the organization. Johannesen left Potomac College, as did four board members, following disagreements with ownership over the business practices that had led to accreditation problems prior to Johannesen joining Potomac College and their unwillingness to substantively address those matters.

Johannesen joined Prism College in Cherry Hill, New Jersey, in the capacity of COO, and eventually President-COO while successfully taking the college out of show cause with ACCET and gaining renewed accreditation for the nursing programs at both the Cherry Hill and Philadelphia campuses, prior to leaving to entertain a consulting opportunity.

Johannesen later took up a role as President of Lincoln College of Technology in Columbia, Maryland.

== Career statistics ==
=== Regular season and playoffs ===
			Regular season					Playoffs
Season	Team	League	GP	G	A	Pts	PIM	GP	G	A	Pts	PIM
1978–79	Billings Bighorns	WHL	2	0	0	0	5	—	—	—	—	—
1979–80	Red Deer Rustlers	AJHL	—	0	23	23	83	7	2	3	5	2
1980–81	Western Michigan University	CCHA	35	2	18	20	65	—	—	—	—	—
1981–82	Western Michigan University	CCHA	33	3	10	13	37	—	—	—	—	—
1982–83	Western Michigan University	CCHA	32	1	9	10	36	—	—	—	—	—
1983–84	Western Michigan University	CCHA	41	4	16	20	80	—	—	—	—	—
1983–84	Kalamazoo Wings	IHL	3	0	0	0	0	—	—	—	—	—
1984–85	Indianapolis Checkers	IHL	51	10	19	29	130	—	—	—	—	—
1984–85	Springfield Indians	AHL	21	1	3	4	59	—	—	—	—	—
1985–86	Springfield Indians	AHL	78	8	21	29	187	—	—	—	—	—
1985–86	New York Islanders	NHL	2	0	0	0	0	—	—	—	—	—
1986–87	Springfield Indians	AHL	54	10	6	16	156	—	—	—	—	—
1987–88	Springfield Indians	AHL	1	0	0	0	0	—	—	—	—	—
1987–88	Peoria Rivermen	IHL	73	24	29	53	172	7	4	3	7	32
1988–89	Springfield Indians	AHL	5	1	1	2	20	—	—	—	—	—
1988–89	Indianapolis Ice	IHL	76	18	23	41	235	—	—	—	—	—
AHL totals			159	20	31	51	422	—	—	—	—	—
IHL totals			203	52	71	123	537	7	4	3	7	32
NHL totals			2	0	0	0	0	—	—	—	—	—
