= Art Institute of Tampa =

For-profit art school as part of The Art Institutes

Coordinates: 27°58′56″N 82°29′59″W

The Art Institute of Tampa
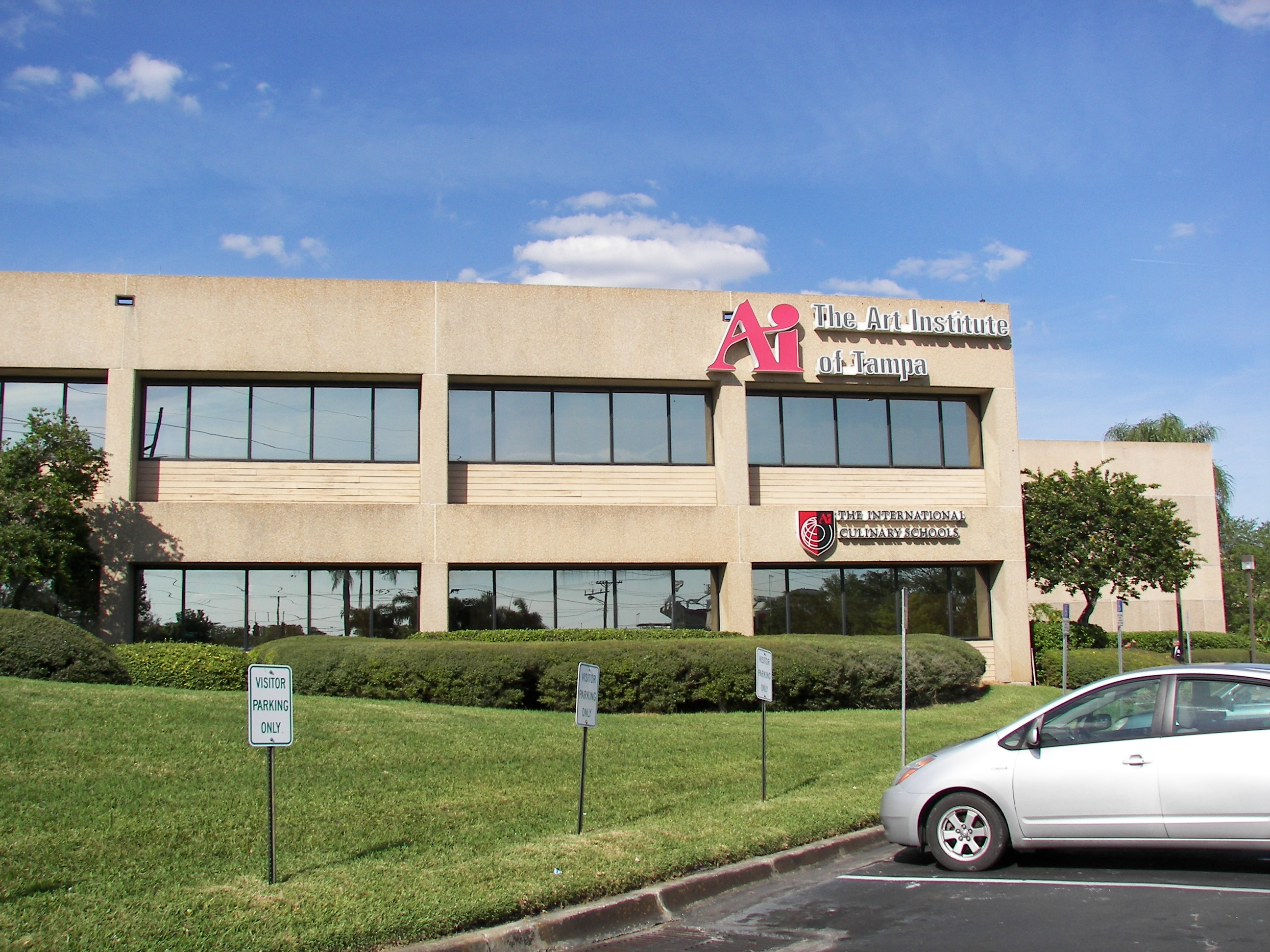
- Type: Private for-profit art school
- Active: 2004–September 30, 2023
- President: Joe Ginatassio
- Location: Tampa, Florida, United States
- Website: www.artinstitutes.edu/tampa

The Art Institute of Tampa was a private for-profit art school in Tampa, Florida. It opened in 2004 as the 30th location within The Art Institutes system of schools. All Art Institute schools closed on September 30, 2023.

The Art Institute of Tampa was a branch of Miami International University of Art & Design, which was accredited by the Commission on Colleges of the Southern Association of Colleges and Schools (SACS).

== Culinary program ==
The Art Institute of Tampa's culinary program garnered much attention. In 2006, its culinary students and staff volunteered to create the menu, make a budget, and prepare and serve the food for a Pinellas County Habitat for Humanity charity event called Building Dreams. In 2007, articles in the St. Petersburg Times indicated that the school had been a sponsor of the Best Teen Chef competition.

== Student outcomes ==
According to the College Navigator, the school had an overall graduation rate of 22 percent.
