= New England Institute of Art =

Former for-profit art school as part of The Art Institutes

Coordinates: 42°19′54.38″N 71°07′00.24″W

The New England Institute of Art
- Former names: Norm Prescott School of Broadcasting; The Northeast Broadcasting School; The Northeast College of Communications; Massachusetts Communications College; The New England Institute of Art & Communications
- Type: Private for-profit art school
- Active: 1952–2017
- Parent institution: The Art Institutes, EDMC
- President: Tad Hadley
- Academic staff: 191
- Students: 450
- Location: Brookline, Massachusetts, United States of America
- Website: www.artinstitutes.edu/boston

The New England Institute of Art (NEiA) was a private for-profit art school in Brookline, Massachusetts. The school was founded in 1952 as the Norm Prescott School of Broadcasting and was one of the 45 Art Institutes in North America. The school offered ten majors in art fields taught by professionals of those industries. Most recently, the institution offered nine Bachelor of Science degrees and three Associate in Science. It was accredited by the New England Association of Schools and Colleges. It ceased enrolling new students in 2015 and closed in 2017.

== History ==
Founded in 1952, the New England Institute of Art was originally called the Norm Prescott School of Broadcasting. In 1962, the school was sold to Victor Best and renamed The Northeast Broadcasting School. Northeast Company Inc. bought the school in 1988; at that time the curriculum was only a diploma in Radio and Television Broadcasting. Not until July 1991 did the school offer a second diploma in Recording Arts. By this time the name had been changed to Northeast College of Communications.

By September 1995 the school was granted the authority to offer Associates of Science degrees in Broadcasting and Recording Arts. 1997 brought yet another change of the name to Massachusetts Communications College. During 1998 three more associate degrees became available: Communications Studies, Multimedia Communications, and Internet Communications.

An associate degree in Graphic Design became available in June 2000, and in 2001 the school changed its name once again to The New England Institute of Art and Communications. In December 2001, the school started awarding Bachelor of Science degrees. The Center of Professional Development opened during 2002, allowing the school to award certificates. The board of trustees approved one more name change in May 2003: The New England Institute of Art. This name is chosen for it is felt this name better fits with the degrees offered. As of 2009, the school was accredited by the New England Association of Schools and Colleges through the Commission on Institutions of Higher Education.

== Notable faculty ==
- Hugo Burnham - General Education Faculty
