= Bristol University (California) =

University in Anaheim, California, United States

- Former names: Kensington College
- Type: Private university
- Active: 1991–2017
- Accreditation: ACICS
- Location: Anaheim, California; 33°47′44″N 117°52′58″W
- Nickname: Bears
- Sporting affiliations: USCAA
- Website: bristoluniversity.edu (archived)

Bristol University was a private university in Anaheim, California. It was established in 1991 as Kensington College. It became a university in 2011 and was renamed Bristol University. It closed in 2017 after several years of financial challenges.

== History ==
Bristol was founded in Santa Ana as Kensington College in 1991. In 2009, the school initiated an MBA program. In 2011, the school moved to Anaheim and was renamed Bristol University. The first graduating class of Bristol was in 2014.

In November 2014 Bristol University was sued by its recruitment firm. In April 2017, Bristol University lost its lawsuit as a result of two of its representatives, Gene A. Raltz and Lourdes Cruz, admitting to lying under penalties of perjury, leaving Bristol University with a guilty verdict and ordered to pay a significant sum which lead them to file for bankruptcy in 2017.

In April 2015, the US Department of Education placed Bristol on a program called Heightened Cash Monitoring Level 2, which delays cash payments to universities because they were out of compliance with distance learning regulations. In September 2015, the Department of Education informed Bristol they were no longer eligible to participate in federal financial aid programs, because the school disclosed a material change in ownership twenty five days late.

The Accrediting Council for Independent Colleges and Schools denied the institution accreditation on December 22, 2015. As this prevented the school from accepting new students, Bristol filed a suit in federal court and was granted relief, reinstating their accreditation in 2016. Bristol's position that the accrediting agency engaged in negligence by failing to follow the proper procedures in removing their accreditation. However, the judgment was later overruled Bristol filed for bankruptcy in 2017, closing its doors the same year.

== Tuition ==
The school reported the average cost to earn a bachelor's degree from 2014 to 2017 was approximately $47,400, and took an average of 31 months to complete.

== Athletics ==
The school at one time supported sixteen sports teams, competing in the United States Collegiate Athletic Association as the Bears. Despite the school's small size, both the men's and women's basketball teams played several games against much larger NCAA Division I teams, including 5 games in the 2015 season alone. Men's sports include baseball, basketball, cross country, golf, soccer, tennis, track and volleyball. Women's sports include basketball, cross country, golf, soccer, softball, tennis, track and volleyball.

== Notable people ==
- Jeron Roberts, professional basketball for the Israeli National basketball team served as athletic director.
