= Cynthia Baum =

American psychologist and academic administrator

Chancellor of Argosy University
- In office 2015–2019

9th President of Walden University
- In office 2012–2014
- Preceded by: Jonathan A. Kaplan
- Succeeded by: Jonathan A. Kaplan

Personal details
- Education: Denison University (BS); University of Georgia (MS, PhD)
- Occupation: Psychologist, academic administrator

Cynthia Gail Baum is an American clinical psychologist and academic administrator serving as provost and vice president for academic affairs at Thomas Edison State University. She was the president of Walden University and the chancellor of Argosy University.

== Education ==
Baum earned a bachelor of science in psychology at Denison University. She has a master of science and doctor of philosophy in clinical psychology from the University of Georgia. Her 1982 dissertation was titled "Psychological and social factors associated with adolescent obesity.

== Career ==
Baum is a clinical psychologist. She was a full-time faculty member of Virginia Tech and Catholic University of America. Baum is a former assistant executive director for education of the American Psychological Association. Baum served as the executive vice president of Walden University. In 2012, she was appointed as the 9th president, replacing Jonathan A. Kaplan. In 2015, Baum became the chancellor of Argosy University. She is provost and vice president for academic affairs at Thomas Edison State University.
