= Jeron Roberts =

American-Israeli basketball player

Jeron Roberts ג'רון רוברטס
Personal information
- Born: October 11, 1976 (age 50) Covina, California
- Listed height: 6 ft 6 in (1.98 m)
- Listed weight: 210 lb (95 kg)

Career information
- High school: Charter Oak (Covina, California)
- College: Wyoming (1994–1998)
- NBA draft: 1998: undrafted
- Playing career: 1998–2012
- Position: Guard

Career history
- 1998–1999: Pınar Karşıyaka
- 1999: Atlanta Trojans
- 2000: Maccabi Kiryat Motzkin
- 2001–2002: Hapoel Lev Hasharon
- 2002–2003: West Petrom Arad
- 2004: Elitzur Ramle
- 2005: Maccabi Ashdod
- 2005–2006: Hapoel Tel Aviv
- 2006–2007: AEL Limassol
- 2007–2008: ABC Amsterdam
- 2008–2009: Ironi Ashkelon
- 2009: APOEL
- 2010–2012: Ironi Nahariya

Career highlights
- FIBA EuroCup All-Star Day (2007)

Jeron Roberts (Hebrew: ג'רון רוברטס; born November 10, 1976) is a retired American-Israeli professional basketball player. He played college basketball at the University of Wyoming. He was called up by Israel national basketball team manager Zvi ("Zvika") Sherf to represent Israel at the European Championships 2007 in Spain.

== Biography ==
He obtained Israeli citizenship in 2006. He was a starter for the Israel national basketball team during the 2007 European Championships.

After coaching at Pacific University, he is currently athletic director at Bristol University in Anaheim, California
