= Heightened cash monitoring =

Regulatory process to monitor universities

Heightened cash monitoring is a regulatory process used by the United States Department of Education to monitor certain universities that receive student financial aid disbursements from the government and may be in financial difficulty.

== History ==
=== 2010s ===
The Department of Education first began releasing Heightened Cash Monitoring records in 2015 following media investigations by Inside Higher Ed. These reports suggested that the government was intentionally withholding the identities of institutions whose financial or administrative instability had already triggered restricted access to federal aid.

In that earliest March 2015 list, of 560 institutions subject to heightened cash monitoring, 487 were at level HCM1, the lower level of monitoring, and 69 were on the stricter level 2 (HCM2).

=== 2020s ===
Of the colleges that utilize federal funding, nearly 10% fell under level one status (HCM1) in 2023. Specifically, the Department of Education designated 493 institutions as HCM1 and another 78 as HCM2, comprising about 10% of participating institutions at the time.

== Levels ==
There are three levels of monitoring that can apply to an institution. Level 1 (HCM1) is the least severe.

=== Level 1 ===
Institutions assigned to level one, known as "HCM1", have to provide funds to students out of their own reserves, and then draw the funds afterward from the Federal Student Aid (FSA) program.

While heightened cash monitoring designations are invariably for institutions with serious financial problems requiring closer attention by the Department of Education, Harvard University was placed on Heightened Cash Monitoring level 1 in September 2025. Jon Fansmith, of the American Council on Education described the move by the United States Department of Education as "harassment."

Harvard has a $53 billion endowment. Prior to assigning it to HCM1 status, the administration had restricted research funding and pressured Harvard to pay a $500 million fine but it did not submit to these and other demands.

=== Level 2 ===
HCM2 institutions provide funds to students out of their own reserves, and then seek reimbursement afterward from the FSA program of the Department of Education. Notable institutions on Heightened Cash Monitoring 2 by the United States Department of Education as of June 2026 include:

- California College of Music, Pasadena, California
- Centro de Enseñanza Técnica y Superior in Mexicali, Mexico
- Hobe Sound Bible College in Hobe Sound, Florida
- Saint Augustine's University in Raleigh, North Carolina
- Shorter College in North Little Rock, Arkansas
- Sotheby's Institute of Art in London, England and New York City, New York
- University of Buckingham in Buckingham, England
- Urshan University in Wentzville, Missouri
- Yeshiva of Nitra in Brooklyn, Chester and Mount Kisco, New York

Notable institutions formerly on Heightened Cash Monitoring 2 include:

- Paul Smith's College in Paul Smiths, New York

=== Reimbursement level ===
A stronger version of level two, in which the FSA reviews every payment reimbursement request by the educational institution before acting on it.

== Former institutions ==
Institutions that were on Heightened Cash Monitoring and subsequently closed include:

=== Level 1 ===
- Art Institute of Las Vegas (2019)
- The Art Institutes (2023)

=== Level 2 ===
- ITT Technical Institute, closed in 2016
- St. Catharine College, closed in 2016
- Bristol University, in 2015; closed 2017
- Vatterott College, closed in 2018
- Independence University, in 2021; closed that same year
- Eastern Gateway Community College, in 2022; closed in 2024
- Florida Career College, in 2022; closed in 2024
- Northwestern College, in 2022; closed in 2024
- Union Institute and University, in 2023; closed 2024
- Oakland City University in Oakland City, Indiana, closed in 2026
