= South University =

U.S. for-profit university system

Coordinates: 31.999°N 81.105°W

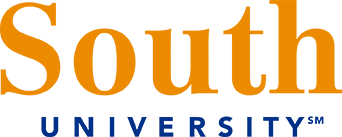
- Former names: Draughon's Practical Business College, South College
- Type: Private for-profit university
- Established: 1899
- Chancellor: Benjamin J. DeGweck
- Students: 9,930
- Location: Savannah (Main Campus), Georgia, United States
- Website: southuniversity.edu

South University is a private for-profit university with its main campus and online operations in Savannah, Georgia, United States. Founded in 1899, South University consists of its School of Pharmacy, College of Nursing and Public Health, College of Health Professions, College of Business, College of Theology, and College of Arts and Sciences. The university is accredited by the Southern Association of Colleges and Schools Commission on Colleges.

== History ==
South University was founded in Savannah, Georgia, in 1899 as Draughan's Practical Business College. The private school taught accounting, banking, typewriting, bookkeeping, and shorthand.

The South family acquired the institution in 1974 and changed its name to Draughan's Junior College. In 1986, that name was changed to South College. In 2001, the Southern Association of Colleges and Schools accredited South College at the master's level and the school was renamed South University. This name change resulted in a 2002 legal dispute with Sewanee: The University of the South, which had registered the name "The University of the South" with the U.S. Patent Office. The issue was resolved in 2003, with both schools retaining their names.

In 2003, Education Management Corporation (EDMC) acquired South University. The following year, the university expanded from its main campus in Savannah, Georgia, to eleven other locations in the United States and began offering online courses. By 2013, 52 percent of South University students were enrolled entirely online.

=== Period of multiple ownerships (2010s) ===
In 2015, EDMC, South University's former parent company, was found to have violated the False Claims Act on multiple occasions through its student recruitment practices and marketing strategies. As part of the settlement, the university was ordered by the federal court to forgive more than $100.8 million in student loan debt held by more than 80,000 former students. U.S. Attorney David J. Hickton of the Western District of Pennsylvania stated that "[c]ompanies cannot enrich their corporate coffers at the expense of students seeking a quality education, or on the backs of taxpayers who are funding our critical financial aid programs ... Today's global settlement sends an unmistakable message to all for-profit education companies: the United States will aggressively ferret out fraud and protect innocent students and taxpayer dollars from this kind of egregious abuse."

In December 2016, South University was placed on probation by the Southern Association of Colleges and Schools (SACS) due to financial concerns regarding its parent company at the time, EDMC. South University was removed from probation in December 2017 after the sale to Dream Center Education Holdings and SACS approved the university's conversion to not-for-profit status (although the U.S. Department of Education classifies the institution as for-profit.).

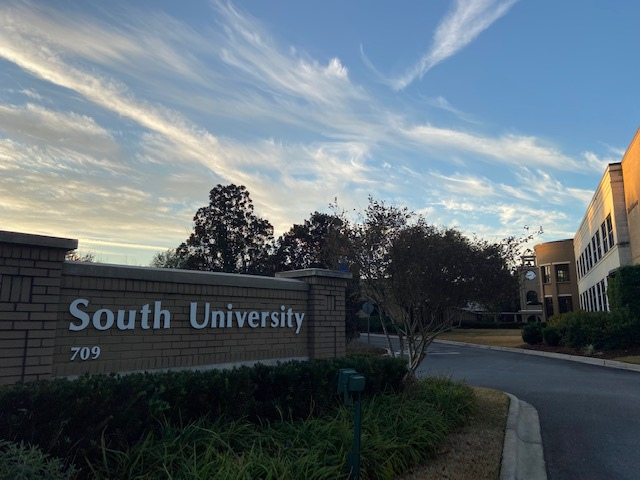
South University's Savannah campus

South University's Savannah campus (which includes its online students) celebrated its largest graduating class in the institution's history in June 2017, when more than 3,500 students received degrees. On October 17, 2017, the university's former parent company, Education Management Corporation, reported that it had sold its schools to the Los Angeles-based Dream Center Foundation, a non-profit organization.

In 2019, South University fired a large majority of its workforce including the online support staff located in Chandler, Arizona, closing the site. South University was expected to be transferred to Education Principle Foundation. In the meantime, all South campuses were operated independently. The court-appointed receiver Studio Enterprise, giving the university until April 11, 2019, to negotiate to separate South and remaining Art Institute schools from the Dream Center Education IT Platform by September 11, 2019. Writing for the Republic Report, David Halperin opined that "should they fail to agree, the plan of reorganization will likely fail, thereby dooming South University and the Art Institutes." The court-appointed receiver has also reported that "there is a 'scattered matching of revenues and expenses' among all the former EDMC schools, making it difficult to determine the true financial picture at the schools in receivership and those controlled by Education Principle Foundation."

=== Return to independence (2020s) ===
In 2020, South University received $7,726,170 in federal funding under the CARES Act. South was allocated an additional $5.1 million under HEERF II. On December 4, 2020, South University closed on a loan from Blue Ridge Bank under the Federal Reserve's Main Street Lending Program, assuming $50 million in debt, with a $35 million balloon payment in 2025.

In 2021 a class action lawsuit was filed against Education Principle Foundation and South University for making illegal robocalls.

In 2022, South University was one of 153 institutions included in student loan cancellation due to alleged fraud. The class action was brought by a group of more than 200,000 student borrowers, assisted by the Project on Predatory Student Lending, part of the Legal Services Center of Harvard Law School. A settlement was approved in August 2022, stating that the schools on the list were included "substantial misconduct by the listed schools, whether credibly alleged or in some instances proven." In April 2023, the Supreme Court rejected a challenge to the settlement and allowed to proceed the debt cancellation due to alleged fraud.

In July 2023, South University returned to being a private institution, twenty years after it was acquired by EDMC. The South University Board of Trustees and Education Principle Foundation Board unanimously voted to separate South University from the Education Principle Foundation, creating an independent institution managed by its Board of Trustees.

In June 2024, South University was publicly placed on warning by its accrediting organization for failing to meet governance criteria.

In September 2026, for-profit Perdoceo Education announced it was acquiring South University for $140 million.

== Campuses and off-campus instructional sites ==
- South University Austin, Round Rock, Texas (300 students)
- South University Atlanta, Atlanta, Georgia
- South University Columbia, Columbia, South Carolina (510 students)
- South University High Point, High Point, North Carolina
- South University Montgomery, Montgomery, Alabama (361 students)
- South University Orlando, Orlando, Florida
- South University Online, Savannah, Georgia (7,707 students)
- South University Richmond, Glen Allen, Virginia (442 students)
- South University Savannah, Savannah Georgia (787 students)
- South University Tampa, Tampa, Florida (712 students)
- South University Virginia Beach, Virginia Beach, Virginia (240 students)
- South University West Palm Beach, Royal Palm Beach, Florida (528 students)

== Academics ==
=== Faculty ===
South University relies on an unbundling of academic labor. The online campus has 41 full-time instructors and 539 part-time instructors for 7,707 students. South's largest physical campus, in Tampa, Florida, has 16 full-time instructors and 65 part-time instructors for 712 students.

=== Accreditation ===
South University is regionally accredited by the Southern Association of Colleges and Schools Commission on Colleges (SACSCOC) to award doctoral, master's, bachelor's, and associate degrees. The institution is classified by SACSCOC as a Level VI institution, meaning it offers four or more doctoral degree programs. The university also offers post-graduate certificate programs through its College of Nursing and Public Health.

=== School of Pharmacy ===
South University became the first university in the Savannah area to offer a health professions doctorate when it launched its Doctor of Pharmacy program in 2002. South University's accelerated Doctor of Pharmacy degree (Pharm.D.) program is one of only a limited number nationwide that provides four academic years of study within three calendar years. The degree program is offered at both the Savannah, Georgia and Columbia, South Carolina campuses.

The Doctor of Pharmacy program is accredited by the Accreditation Council for Pharmacy Education (ACPTE).

=== College of Health Professions ===
South University and Emory University are the only two institutions in the state of Georgia that offer a Master of Medical Science in Anesthesia Science program. South University's program is accredited by the Commission on Accreditation of Allied Health Education Programs upon the recommendation of the Accreditation Review Committee for the Anesthesiologist Assistants (ARC-AA). An Anesthesiologist assistant is qualified by virtue of their education and training at the master's degree level to deliver anesthesia as a member of an anesthesia care team led by a physician anesthesiologist.

The university launched its Master of Science in Physician Assistant program in 2002, and it is one of only five programs in the state of Georgia. A Physician Assistant is prepared to work in a medical setting with the ability to evaluate, monitor, diagnose, counsel, refer patients and prescribe medication.

The Master of Science in Physician Assistant program is offered at South University's Savannah, Tampa, West Palm Beach, and Richmond campuses and is accredited by The Accreditation Review Commission on Education for the Physician Assistant (ARC-PA).

=== College of Nursing and Public Health ===
South University's College of Nursing and Public Health prepares students to practice at all levels of the nursing profession by providing programs at the bachelor's, master's, doctorate and post-graduate certificate level. Programs include an RN to Bachelor of Science in Nursing and Doctor of Nursing Practice. The university also offers Master of Science with a Specialization in Family Nurse Practitioner.

The institution's College of Nursing and Public Health programs are accredited by the Commission on Collegiate Nursing Education (CCNE).

=== College of Business ===
The College of Business offers undergraduate degrees in areas that include business administration, healthcare administration and information technology. Graduate programs include a Master of Business Administration and Accelerated Master of Business Administration (AMBA) in Healthcare Administration.

The Bachelor of Business Administration, Bachelor of Science in Healthcare Management, Master of Business Administration, Accelerated Master of Business Administration, Master of Business Administration in Healthcare Administration and Accelerated Master of Business Administration in Healthcare Administration programs at South University, Savannah are accredited by the Accreditation Council for Business Schools and Programs (ACBSP).

=== College of Theology ===
South University's College of Theology was established in 2013, and graduated its first Doctor of Ministry (D.Min.) student in 2016.

The South University College of Theology differs from traditional seminaries, because rather than focusing on the doctrine of one faith, it prepares its students (who come from different denominations and religious backgrounds) to minister in the Christian tradition to people of various faiths and, potentially, in various times of spiritual crisis.

=== College of Arts & Sciences ===
The College of Arts & Sciences houses South University's undergraduate programs in Criminal Justice, Legal Studies and Paralegal Studies.

== Student body ==
South University's undergraduate online campus (3,481 students) is 46 percent black, 37 percent white, and 10 percent Hispanic. Eighty-five percent are eligible for low-income Pell Grants and 79 percent receive federal loans.

== Student life ==
=== Honor societies ===
South University students are eligible for membership in a number of national and international honor societies. These include the Delta Mu Delta International Honor Society in Business, Sigma Theta Tau, which recognizes outstanding academic achievement by nursing students, and Pi Gamma Mu, which is the International Honor Society in Social Sciences. South University Doctor of Pharmacy students are eligible for membership in Rho Chi, the academic honor society in Pharmacy. South University's College of Theology was granted a chapter of Theta Alpha Kappa, the National Honor Society for Religious Studies and Theology in 2017.

== Notable alumni ==
- Tapai Alailepule Benjamin Vaivao, American Samoan politician

== Finances ==
In 2022, South University had $156 million in assets and $155 million in liabilities. The schools spent $86.6 million on employee compensation ($43.6 million for instruction) and $41.8 million in advertising. South paid Studio Enterprise $47.3M in 2022.

According to the US Department of Education's College Scorecard, South University is on Heightened Cash Monitoring 2 "requiring additional oversight because of financial or federal compliance issues."

== Student outcomes ==
According to the College Scorecard, the Savannah online campus has an undergraduate graduation rate of 8 percent. Forty percent of South University's students earn more than a high school graduate after attending. Nine percent of South University's student debtors are making progress with their federal student loans two years after completion.
