= Gainful employment =

Form of employment

Broadly, gainful employment refers to an employment situation where the employee receives steady work, payment from the employer and that allows for self-sufficiency.

In psychology, the term refers to a positive psychology concept that explores the benefits of work and employment. Second only to personal relationships, work is the most important determinant of quality of life. Over 7855 articles were published on job satisfaction between the years 1976 and 2000.

Positive psychology's emphasis on gainful employment has increased the amount of recent publications on gainful employment and its impact on quality of life and illnesses like depression. Present measurements of employment emphasize decreasing the unemployment, as opposed to increasing gainful employment. Positive psychology argues that gainful employment is a necessary component of living a fulfilled life, noting its positive impact on identity, social support, purpose, and challenge.

== Components of gainful employment ==
Gainful employment is characterized by the following nine components:

1. Variety in duties performed - A lack in variability can lead to presenteeism, in which the employee physically goes to work, but becomes unproductive or discontent due to boredom with repetitive work activities. If the tasks at work are varied, satisfaction comes more easily.

2. Safe working environment - Safe working conditions must be ensured by the organization and its managers. The work setting must also be healthy and supportive, so that employees feel safe in their roles.

3. Income for family and oneself - Income is necessary to support oneself. However, data does not show that people who earn more money are more gainfully employed than those who earn less.

4. A purpose derived from providing a product or service - An individual may derive purpose in life from the work that he or she completes. Many individuals describe their work as a calling, or in other words, “a vocation to which the employee brings a passion—a commitment to the work for its own sake”.

5. Happiness and satisfaction - Enthusiasm and attitude at work. There must be a close match between an individual's activities and his or her knowledge, skills, and attitudes.

6. Positive engagement and involvement - An individual must have a sufficient amount of work to complete, have the necessary knowledge and resources in order to complete the work, and have the opportunity to perform and grow as a result of that work. Warr reported that the most gainfully employed individuals work in settings where the skills of the employee match the skills required for the assigned tasks.

7. A sense of performing well and meeting goals - An individual must believe that he or she is capable of performing well at work and exceeding the goals that he or she set. In order to perform well at work, employees should strive to set SMART (Specific, Measurable, Attainable, Reasonable, and Timely) goals.

8. Friendships at work - Positive companionship has been proven to lead to fewer accidents, more engaged customers, increased achievement, increased job satisfaction, and increased productivity.

9. An environment that respects and appreciates diversity - Racial and ethnic diversity are increasing rapidly in today's workplace. In order to increase diversity, managers may utilize “diversity management” in which they use a variety of management techniques in order to augment the positive outcomes that are linked with diversity in the workplace.

== Major theoretical approaches and applications ==
Emphasis on the relationship between work and fulfillment can be traced back to Sigmund Freud who noted that a healthy life is one in which people have the ability to love and work. Research confirms that when individuals are gainfully employed, as characterized by a safe environment, purpose derived from work, engagement, etc., their quality of and satisfaction with life increases.

Gainful employment is most often approached from a psychological standpoint with business, real world, and clinical applications. Specifically, the Strengths-Based Practice is a psychological approach to gainful employment that has business applications for the employed and people in management positions. In management in particular, managers who focus on employee strengths, communicate company goals, and give constructive feedback to employees promote gainful employment. One example of this is the Clifton Strengths Finder, from the book Now, Discover Your Strengths which employs positive psychology principles to build on the strengths that employees already have, as opposed to changing their weaknesses and deficiencies. According to a study done by Clifton and Harter, the strengths-based approach to gainful employment results in three major steps 1) the identification of talents, 2) the integration of talents into the employee's image and workplace, and 3) tactual behavior change in which the employee begins to view his or her success as a result of his or her unique talents.

Career counseling represents another psychological approach to gainful employment with business and real world applications for individuals seeking employment. Vocational counselors work with individuals who are considering new careers not only to secure employment for them, but also to ensure organizational fit and job satisfaction. For example, a vocational counselor may ask their client to complete an Assets Exercise, in which the client writes down his or her “Assets” and Debits” on a sheet of paper with two-columns—one for “Assets” and another for “Debits”. This exercise allows the client to consider his or her strengths, interests, and talents, and helps the counselor determine what types of professions will be the most beneficial for the client.

Gainful employment, when approached from a psychological perspective has been shown to have relevant clinical and real world applications. Individuals with traumatic brain injuries demonstrate greater psychological well-being and perceived quality of life if gainfully employed. In a study assessing perceived quality of life in individuals with traumatic brain injury, findings indicated that the level of engagement in work activities was significantly related to perceived quality of life, suggesting that gainful employment leads to more favorable appraisals of quality of life. Similar findings argue that gainful employment may function to provide a buffer against depression and anxiety in individuals with traumatic brain injury.

Gainful employment is also a contributing factor in the social perception of an individual by others. Gainful employment significantly reduces the social stigma shown by adults towards a fictional person coping with schizophrenia. These findings suggest that gainful employment has internal, clinical benefits for the individual as well as external, real-world benefits on how others perceive individuals

== Major empirical findings ==
Major empirical findings indicate that if people have overall positive experiences at work, their overall job satisfaction will be higher even if their overall life satisfaction may not be high. For example, a study obtained data from 479 police officers to test the spillover effects of non-work experiences and non-work satisfaction on work experiences and work satisfaction. The findings note that job satisfaction is the fourth major category leading to overall life satisfaction. The findings also indicate that non-work satisfaction does not replace or compensate for a lack of job satisfaction. Additionally, quality of life is in part defined by social utility, of which a large consideration is an individual's ability to make meaningful contributions to society through gainful employment.

Job fit and work environment appear to be key components of gainful employment. In an analysis of over 300,000 people, the phrase “I have the opportunity to do what I do best” was highly correlated with work productivity and success. This suggests that workers’ job fit and ability to perform well in an industry leads to increased job satisfaction. Additionally, studies indicate that working in low-control jobs, or jobs where workers do not have the ability to meet the job demands, is correlated with a 43% increased chance of death. Increased mortality was due to workers’ lack of job control to meet the demands of the job, which led to continuous job strain and stress. These findings argue in favor of gainful employment and provide evidence for the importance of job fit to the good life and overall health.

Gainful employment may be heavily based on an individual's outlook. A study assessed outlook based on participants’ initial happiness, perspective on employment, and ability to make meaning out of their work. The findings indicate that employees who were already happy and had a positive outlook were more likely to find greater job satisfaction and success, which suggests that happiness and job satisfaction are bidirectional. These findings provide additional support for studies that argue that gainful employment is based less on one's external work environment and more on one's perspective of employment as either a job (focus on financial rewards and necessity), a career (focus on advancement), or a calling (focus on enjoyment of fulfilling, socially useful work). Individuals who view their work as a calling experience overall increased satisfaction.

== Legal concept in the United States ==
From a legal standpoint, gainful employment is defined as work that a person can pursue and perform for money or activities intended to provide an income to a person. Recently gainful employment has also been approached from the political perspective and applied to education reform. The Gainful Employment Rule is an example of a policy regarding gainful employment that has educational applications. According to the U.S. Department of Education, the Gainful Employment Rule “requires schools to provide their students with an education adequate enough for them to pay their college loans back” so that they will be gainfully employed after they graduate from college. In October 2010, the Barack Obama administration designed a set of rules to provide aid for educational institutions. They expect this funding to protect students from inappropriate recruiting practices and increase information about the quality and effectiveness of college and training programs.

=== Gainful employment and Social Security law ===
The United States Social Security Administration uses a slightly differing definition of "Gainful Employment", when evaluating SSI and disability cases, referred to as "Substantial Gainful Activity (SGA)". SGA is defined as being able to make more than a set indexed amount of lawful wages per month, which is set higher for blind individuals than for non-blind individuals, pursuant to the Social Security Act. The amount set as of the year 2017 is $1,950 per month for legally blind individuals, and is $1,170 per month for non-blind individuals. However, the higher amount for blind individuals does not apply to SSI cases. Volunteering may be considered to be Substantial Gainful Activity (SGA).

=== Gainful employment and federal college aid ===
College eligibility for federal aid in some circumstances depends on a showing that the educational program prepares students for "gainful employment in a recognized occupation." A Gainful Employment Rule proposed by the Obama administration in 2010 sought to establish measures of student loan debt and graduates earnings that would determine ongoing eligibility for government aid. After court battles and revision, the Obama rule was rescinded by the Trump Administration.

== Conclusion ==
While unemployment rates continue to be a significant problem in terms of elevated overall percentages of the general population, positive psychologists would argue that the lack of gainfully employed individuals is also a pressing concern that deserves attention. The relationships between gainful employment and quality of life and satisfaction with life suggest that job satisfaction, as its own domain of happiness, is best achieved through gainful employment and is a necessary yet insufficient component of living a fulfilled and happy enough life.
