= Miami International University of Art & Design =

For-profit art school in Miami, Florida

Coordinates: 25°47′22.91″N 80°11′19.84″W

- Type: Private, for-profit art school
- Established: 1965
- President: Leslie Baughman
- Students: 758
- Location: Miami, Florida; Tampa, Florida; Dallas, Texas
- Website: www.artinstitutesedu.us/miami

Miami International University of Art & Design (formerly the International Fine Arts College) was a private, for-profit art school in Miami, Florida. It was owned and operated by the non-profit Education Principle Foundation (aka Colbeck Foundation). The university was accredited by the Southern Association of Colleges and Schools Commission on Colleges (SACSCOC) and a member of the Art Institutes system of schools. All Art Institute schools closed on September 30, 2023.

The university had programs in design, media and visual arts, fashion, and culinary arts. Its sister schools were the Art Institutes, a collection of schools once owned by Education Management Corporation (EDMC) and Dream Center Education Holdings (DCEH).

Established in 1965, the university provided career-focused education in the applied arts and design. It was accredited by the Southern Association of Colleges and Schools.

Miami International University of Art & Design had branch campuses in Tampa, Florida and Dallas.

== Faculty ==
AI Miami had 11 full-time instructors and 93 part-time instructors for 934 students.
