= Argosy University =

Defunct system of for-profit colleges in the US

- Type: Private for-profit university
- Established: 2001–2019
- Chancellor: Cynthia Baum
- Students: 17,600
- Location: United States
- Website: argosy.edu

Argosy University was a private for-profit university with campuses throughout the United States owned by Dream Center Education Holdings (DCEH), LLC and Education Management Corporation.

On February 27, 2019, the U.S. Department of Education stated that they were cutting off federal funding to Argosy University. All Argosy campuses were officially closed shortly thereafter.

== History ==
=== Origins ===
The origins of Argosy University trace to three separate institutions: the American School of Professional Psychology, the Medical Institute of Minnesota, and the University of Sarasota. In the late 1970s, Michael Markovitz founded the Illinois School of Professional Psychology, which later changed its name to the American School of Professional Psychology. In 1976, Markovitz became the founding chairman of Argosy Education Group, which acquired the University of Sarasota in 1992. The University of Sarasota was a business and education-focused school and was founded in 1969. Six years later Argosy Education Group acquired the health profession training school the Medical Institute of Minnesota, which was established in 1961.

=== Education Management Corporation (2001–2017) ===
In July 2001, Argosy Education Group was acquired by Education Management Corporation. Two months later, Argosy Education Group brought together the American School of Professional Psychology, the Medical Institute of Minnesota, and the University of Sarasota under the Argosy University name.

Students of the Argosy University in Dallas filed a Texas lawsuit in 2009 alleging they believed university recruiters inaccurately informed students that the school would soon receive accreditation from the American Psychological Association (APA). The school had not completed accreditation process by the time the students graduated. At the time of the lawsuit, Argosy University Dallas had not applied for APA accreditation. According to a response from Argosy University's parent company, EDMC, accreditation with the APA is not required for clinical psychology licensure in many jurisdictions, including Texas. Argosy officials rejected charges of fraud, noting that pursuit of APA accreditation for the Dallas campus was still underway. As of 2013, Argosy University in Dallas did not offer any degrees in clinical psychology, and was not listed as part of the university's College of Clinical Psychology. In December 2013, EDMC agreed to pay about $3.3 million as part of the lawsuit. The settlement did not require EDMC to admit liability.

In May 2010, the PBS program Frontline aired a program about for-profit universities called "College, Inc." which featured Argosy University among others. Later that year, Argosy University was one of 15 schools named in a Government Accountability Office report. The report stated that recruiters at the school were found to have "made deceptive or otherwise questionable statements" when speaking with undercover applicants. The GAO later revised its report, with Senator Mike Enzi (R-Wyoming) saying the changes made "undermine many of the allegations" in the original report but the head of the GAO maintained that "Nothing changed with the overall message of the report, and nothing changed with any of our findings."

In 2011, Argosy University was investigated by the Florida Attorney General following eight consumer complaints. The school cooperated in the investigation.

In 2012, the law school Western State University College of Law, which was founded in 1966 and originally acquired by Argosy in 2000, was renamed Western State College of Law at Argosy University.

In December 2013, EDMC agreed to pay $3.3 million in restitution and fines to settle charges with the Colorado Attorney General that Argosy University had engaged in deceptive marketing practices. The Colorado Attorney General alleged that Argosy University led students to believe that the school was working to get its Ed.D. in Counseling Psychology degrees accredited by the American Psychological Association and that graduates would be eligible to be licensed psychologists in Colorado, when that did not appear to be true. The settlement did not require EDMC to admit liability. Argosy University changed the Ed.D. in Counseling psychology curricula in order to meet psychology licensing standards.

In May 2015, EDMC was planning on closing in The Art Institute of California, Silicon Valley, a branch campus of Argosy University. In November 2015, Argosy's parent company agreed to forgive more than $100 million of student loan debt to settle claims it violated consumer protection laws.

In 2016, Argosy, Seattle stopped taking new students.

=== Collapse and closure (2017–2019) ===
In March 2017, Education Management Corporation reported that they intended to sell the Argosy schools to the Dream Center, a Los Angeles-based Pentecostal organization. The sale faced scrutiny by regulators. The transaction closed in November 2017; EDMC said it would remain in operation to wind down the approximately fifty schools that had stopped accepting new students.

In 2019, USA Today reported that Argosy University campuses were under receivership and their accreditation was at risk. DCEH's court-appointed receiver, Marc Dottore, wrote to the US Department of Education that Studio Enterprise, a company designated to service former and current DCEH schools, "is taking service fees from the deal without providing any services, draining badly-needed cash from the operation." The Washington Post reported that "being kicked out of the federal student-aid programs, known as Title IV, would sound the death knell for Argosy."

On February 7, 2019, Dottore asked the Department of Education for $13 million in federal student aid funds to pay stipends to students at Argosy University in Southern California.

The Arizona Republic and Inside Higher Education reported that Argosy University failed to distribute more than $9 million in financial aid to its students, and "it's unclear where the money is." The Washington Post subsequently reported that the "... U.S. Education Department cut off federal student loan and grant funds last week after learning Argosy used $13 million owed to students to cover payroll and other expenses."

By mid-February, the WASC Senior College and University Commission (WSCUC), "students should be aware of the possibility that Argosy in Hawaii could abruptly close prior to the completion of their program."

All campuses officially closed doors on March 8, 2019.

At that time of the closure, many higher education institutions scrambled to support Argosy University's students to help them complete the degree programs they had started at Argosy, including Concordia University Texas, Ashford University, Indiana Wesleyan University, DeVry University, Bethel University, Walden University, and American InterContinental University, among others.

Following campus closings, Argosy teachers and staff said that they had not received their final paychecks.

In 2022, Argosy University was one of 153 institutions included in student loan cancellation due to alleged fraud. The class action was brought by a group of more than 200,000 student borrowers, assisted by the Project on Predatory Student Lending, part of the Legal Services Center of Harvard Law School. A settlement was approved in August 2022, stating that the schools on the list were included "substantial misconduct by the listed schools, whether credibly alleged or in some instances proven." In April 2023, the Supreme Court rejected a challenge to the settlement and allowed to proceed the debt cancellation due to alleged fraud.

== Former campuses ==
- Online
- Phoenix
- Pittsburgh
- Art Institute of Hollywood
- Art Institute - Inland Empire (San Bernardino, CA)
- Art Institute - Santa Monica
- Los Angeles
- Orange County (Irvine, CA)
- Art Institute of Orange County (Santa Ana)
- Art Institute of San Diego
- San Francisco Bay Area (Alameda, CA)
- Western State College of Law at Argosy University (Irvine, CA)
- Tampa
- Atlanta
- Chicago
- New York
- Twin Cities (Eagan, MN)
- Dallas
- Salt Lake City
- Denver
- Northern Virginia (Arlington, VA)
- Seattle
- Honolulu
- Sarasota

== Accreditation ==
Argosy University was first accredited by the Higher Learning Commission in 1981 and then the WASC Senior College and University Commission in 2011 with its most recent review in 2018 at which time the school was placed on "show cause" status.

== Student outcomes ==
According to the College Scorecard in 2018, Argosy online's graduation rate was six percent.
