= Dream Center =

Network of Pentecostal community centers

Coordinates: 34°4′27.9″N 118°16′8.83″W

- Founded: 1994
- Founders: Matthew Barnett; Tommy Barnett
- Purpose: Healthcare, Development
- Location(s): 2301 Bellevue Avenue; Los Angeles, California
- Region served: 84 centers
- Key people: Matthew Barnett; Tommy Barnett
- Website: thedcnetwork.org

The Dream Center is a 501(c)(3) nonprofit Christian Pentecostal network of community centers based in Los Angeles, California, established in 1994. The president of Dream Center is Matthew Barnett.

== History ==
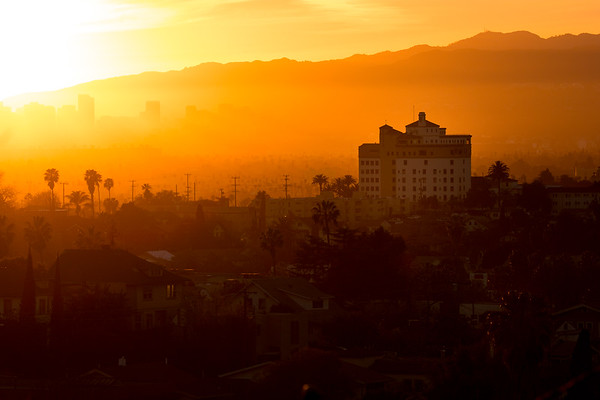
Dream Center Headquarters in Los Angeles.

The organization was founded in 1994 by Pastor Matthew Barnett and Tommy Barnett of Dream City Church as a home missions project of the Southern California District of the Assemblies of God.

In 1996, after purchasing the old Queen of Angels Hospital in Echo Park, it transformed it into a social center for the homeless, prostitutes, and members of street gangs.

In 2001, Pastor Matthew Barnett and the International Church of the Foursquare Gospel merged the Dream Center with the Angelus Temple, making Barnett the senior pastor over Angelus Temple as well as the Dream Center.

Associated Dream Centers have been established in other cities. As of 2022, the organization has established 84 centers in other cities and countries around the world.

== Programs ==
Dream Center offers a food bank, clothing and assistance programs for victims of disaster, domestic violence, drug addiction, human trafficking and prisoners.

Dream Center came to the aid of many Los Angeles fire victims in 2025 with housing, clothing, groceries, toiletries and meals.

== Controversy ==
In 2005, some Hurricane Katrina evacuees staying at the Dream Center said they had difficulty receiving donations. In response to the complaints several social activists, led by Ted Hayes, an advocate for the homeless, called a news conference demanding an investigation of the Dream Center. After visiting the Dream Center, however, and being given a tour of the facility, the activists concluded that the accusations were groundless. "There is no basis to the complaints we've heard," Hayes said, "The horror stories reported to us do not exist."

In 2017, a subsidiary of the Dream Center, in partnership with a private equity fund, purchased the Art Institutes, South University, and Argosy University systems of for-profit colleges from Education Management Corporation. The transaction received significant scrutiny, due to concerns about Dream Center's ability to successfully manage the acquired schools, and criticism that the transaction was designed to allow the schools to avoid increased regulation of for-profit colleges. The transaction was never approved by the Department of Education and in 2019, at least 30 of the art institutes and related colleges were closed, with some closures announced abruptly in the middle of the academic year. Some of the Art Institute programs were transferred to Studio Enterprise, a Los Angeles creative arts training firm funded by principals of the private equity firm Colbeck Capital Management.
