= Accrediting Council for Independent Colleges and Schools =

Former American educational accrediting body

- Formation: 1912
- Dissolved: March 2024
- Type: Former U.S. higher education accreditor
- Location: Washington, D.C.
- President: Michelle Edwards
- Website: www.acics.org

The Accrediting Council for Independent Colleges and Schools (ACICS) was a non-profit education corporation that was recognized by the United States Department of Education as an independent and autonomous higher education accrediting body until 2022. ACICS was also recognized by the Council for Higher Education Accreditation (CHEA) until 2017. ACICS shut down in March 2024.

== History ==
ACICS was established upon the request of Benjamin Franklin Williams, president of Capital City Commercial College in Des Moines, Iowa.

At one time it accredited 245 institutions of higher education offering undergraduate and graduate diplomas and degrees in both traditional formats and through distance education. ACICS was incorporated in Virginia and operated from offices in Washington, D.C. The scope of its recognition by the Department of Education and CHEA was defined as accreditation of private post-secondary educational institutions, both for-profit and non-profit, offering nondegree programs or Associate degrees, Bachelor's degrees and Master's degrees in programs "designed to train and educate persons for professional, technical, or occupational careers".

=== Government investigations and removal of accreditation authority ===
In 2010, ACICS provided information during a U.S. Congressional investigation of for-profit education. ACICS reported that the institutions it accredits are required to demonstrate a student retention rate of at least 75 percent. Retention rates are calculated within a single academic year. In 2015, ACICS fell under significant scrutiny after the collapse of Corinthian Colleges, a for-profit institution that was accredited by ACICS until its sudden demise. A subcommittee of the United States Senate requested information from ACICS in November 2015. Five months later, twelve state attorneys general requested that the U.S. Department of Education withdraw recognition from ACICS as a federally-recognized accreditor. The Consumer Financial Protection Bureau petitioned a federal court to order ACICS to make available information about "its decision to approve several controversial for-profit college chains", and the president of the organization, Al Gray, resigned.

Scrutiny continued in 2016 and intensified after another large chain of for-profit institutions accredited by ACICS, ITT Technical Institute, came under fire by state and federal agencies; the chain closed in 2016 and filed for bankruptcy. U.S. Senator Elizabeth Warren, a prominent critic of ACICS, released a report critical of the accreditor in June. Several days later, the U.S. Department of Education formally recommended that the accreditor's recognition be withdrawn.

In September 2016, A U.S. education secretary wrote in a letter to ACICS: "I am terminating the department's recognition of ACICS as a nationally recognized accrediting agency. ACICS's track record does not inspire confidence that it can address all of the problems effectively." The company immediately announced that it would appeal the decision within the 30 days allowed for appeal, to Education Secretary John King Jr. ACICS unsuccessfully appealed the decision and subsequently sued the Department of Education. Although the Secretary of Education finalized the process of revoking the U.S. Department of Education's recognition of ACICS as an accreditor in December 2016, ACICS's lawsuit resulted in a judge ordering Secretary of Education Betsy DeVos to review the decision in March 2018 as King did not take into account all of the evidence; DeVos subsequently restored the accreditor's recognition by the Department of Education.

Although the Department of Education continued to recognize the accreditor, many institutions left the organization while its status was in question. At the same time, many institutions formerly accredited by ACICS closed. This loss in membership, combined with the legal costs associated with the lawsuits and legal proceedings, placed the organization into financial difficulties including a $2.1 million deficit in 2019. Although the Department of Education restored its recognition of ACICS following its lawsuit, CHEA did not and ACICS withdrew its application to CHEA in early 2020. The scandals surrounding ACICS peaked in Spring of 2020 when USA Today revealed ACICS accredited the "Reagan National University" despite evidence of the "institution" having no students and no faculty.

Following the inauguration of Joe Biden in 2021, the Department of Education again moved to withdraw recognition of ACICS with department staff recommending withdrawal in January and the National Advisory Committee on Institutional Quality and Integrity recommending withdrawal in March.

On August 19, 2022, the Department of Education terminated the ACICS as a higher education accrediting body losing its oversight role for the federal funding aid for education. At that time, there were 27 schools accredited by ACICS with a total enrollment of 5,000 students.

== See also ==
- List of recognized accreditation associations of higher learning
- Higher education accreditation in the United States
- Colleges accredited by the Accrediting Council for Independent Colleges and Schools
