= Education Management Corporation =

Pennsylvania based post secondary institutions in US and Canada

- Type: Public
- Traded as: Nasdaq: EDMC
- Industry: For-profit education
- Founded: 1962; 64 years ago
- Defunct: 2018
- Fate: Bankrupt. Acquired by Dream Center.
- Headquarters: Pittsburgh, Pennsylvania, United States
- Number of locations: 110 campuses
- Area served: United States, Canada
- Key people: Mark A. McEachen (CEO)
- Website: www.edmc.edu

Education Management Corporation (EDMC) was a Pittsburgh, Pennsylvania-based operator of for-profit post-secondary educational institutions in the United States and Canada. The company was founded in 1962. At its peak in 2011, Education Management Corporation operated 110 schools through its higher education divisions: Argosy University, The Art Institutes, Brown Mackie College, and South University, and enrolled 158,300 students.

Facing declining enrollment, legal issues, and accreditation problems, EDMC closed or sold many of its schools between 2013 and 2017. By 2014, the company's stock had lost 99.9% of its value, and EDMC received a defaulted bond rating (to junk bond status). Moody's credit rating service in January 2015 dropped EDMC to its lowest rating, D-PD.

In June 2018, EMDC filed for Chapter 7 bankruptcy and began to liquidate its assets.

== Funding and expenses ==
Eighty percent of Education Management's funds came from US government funds, from US Department of Education Title IV programs (Pell Grants and federal student loans), the US Department of Defense, and the Veterans Administration. In 2009, EDMC allocated 21.6 percent of its revenue, or $435 million, to marketing and recruiting, and 16 percent, or $319 million, to profit. EDMC spent over $500,000 per year on lobbyists between 2010 and 2015.

== Programs ==
EDMC operated through four major groups of schools, Argosy University, The Art Institutes, Brown Mackie College, South University. It also owned a law school, Western State University College of Law.

Programs offered included doctoral, master's, bachelor's, associate and certificate level.

As of January 2013, EDMC operated 110 colleges and universities in 32 U.S. states and Canada.

=== Colleges and universities ===
Argosy University became part of EDMC in July 2001, when Education Management Corporation acquired Argosy Education Group. Argosy schools were sold along with other EDMC schools to Dream Center in 2017. All Argosy campuses were officially closed on March 8, 2019.

The Art Institutes, of which there were approximately 50 locations in the U.S. and Canada, offered programs in design, fashion, media and culinary arts. In 2017, Education Management Corporation sold the existing Art Institutes to The Dream Center Foundation, a Los Angeles-based Pentecostal organization. The sale was complete in October 2017. As of August 2019, eight locations remain open to new students, operated by the Education Principle Foundation, and no longer connected to EDMC or Dream Center. All remaining Art Institute schools will close on September 30, 2023.

Brown Mackie College offered programs in health sciences, business, legal studies, information technology and design technology at the associate and bachelor's level. The school also offers diploma and certificate programs. In 2012, there were 28 Brown Mackie College locations in the U.S. In June 2016, it was announced that 22 of 26 Brown Mackie campuses were closing. The Akron campus was closed in September 2006. The last three campuses were sold to Ross Medical Education Center in 2017.

South University was a for-profit university with its main campus in Savannah, Georgia. Additional locations are in Alabama, Florida, Georgia, South Carolina, Texas, and Virginia. Education Management Corporation acquired South University in 2003. The schools were sold along with other EDMC schools to Dream Center in 2017.

== History ==
=== Foundation and early history ===
EDMC was incorporated in Pennsylvania in 1962 and acquired its first educational institution in 1969 with the purchase of the nearly 50-year-old Art Institute of Pittsburgh.

In June 1986, Robert Knutson and Merrill Lynch Capital Partners led a recapitalization of the company in which Richard Royston, co-CEO, was bought out. At the time there were eight Art Institutes. In October 1996 the EDMC conducted an initial public offering ($92.4 million in 2025 dollars). By 1998, EDMC served 17,400 students at 15 Art Institutes and three additional schools.

=== Expansion in the 2000s ===
In July 2001, EDMC purchased Chicago-based Argosy Education Group, the operator of Argosy University campuses, for $78 million ($142 million in 2025 dollars). The acquisition allowed EDMC to offer programs in law, education and business.

In 2003 EDMC acquired the health sciences-focused South University in April and 18 schools operated by the Ohio-based American Education Centers in June, which were re-branded Brown Mackie College a year later. In September 2003, former Maine governor John McKernan became EDMC chief executive officer, serving until 2007. He oversaw continued acquisitions of existing art and design schools in the U.S. and Canada, construction of new Art Institute locations and the establishment of on-line education programs.

Goldman Sachs, Providence Equity Partners and Leeds Equity Partners acquired EDMC and its 70 schools for $3.4 billion in March 2006 ($5.43 billion in 2025 dollars). On June 1, 2006, EDMC was taken private again in the largest for-profit education sector buyout at that time. At the time of the acquisition EDMC's schools were serving around 72,000 students, 4,000 of whom were enrolled in online programs. The additional capital was used grow online enrollment to more than 40,000 students by the end of the decade, made possible in part by a 2006 Congressional revision to the "50% rule", which formerly required accredited schools to enroll more than half their students in campus-based programs in order to maintain federal loan eligibility.

Todd S. Nelson, who was previously the CEO of Apollo Education Group, became the CEO in 2007 and the chairman of the board of directors in 2012.

On September 21, 2009, EDMC became a public company once again, raising $330 million ($495 million in 2025 dollars) on the NASDAQ while Goldman Sachs retained 40% ownership.

Enrollment in EDMC's online programs ballooned from 7,900 in 2007 to 42,300 in 2012, due in large part to practices that devoted more per-student expenditures to marketing ($4,158) than on education ($3,460). The next few years saw dramatic drops in enrollment and massive layoffs in the online division.

=== Recent history ===
In 2011, EDMC and its then-subsidiary, the Art Institutes, received greater public scrutiny with the release of the Frontline documentary: Educating Sergeant Pantzke. In the documentary, Iraq war veteran Chris Pantzke discussed the lack of disability services at the school. According to Pantzke, "Being a soldier, you don't want to quit, you don't want to give up or fail." But after doing his own research, Pantzke concluded that the degree he was pursuing wasn't "worth much more than the paper is worth". And he felt he was "throwing away taxpayer money" by using GI Bill funds.

In 2012, Edward West replaced Todd Nelson as CEO, while Nelson replaced McKernan as chairman. After the growth in student numbers in the late 2000s, EDMC's enrollment declined from around 160,000 students in 2011 to approximately 130,000 students at the end of 2012. EDMC has attributed this to the economic downturn of the late 2000s and new federal restrictions on the PLUS Loan program.

The decrease in enrollment, coupled with pending changes to the U.S. Department of Education's "gainful employment" rule, prompted EDMC to hold off expansion plans in 2012, and led to several rounds of layoffs. Only one new school opening has been announced in the 2013 fiscal year. In February 2013, EDMC announced a tuition freeze through at least 2015, as part of a strategy to refocus on students. As of 2014 enrollment was 120,920 students, a decrease of nine percent.

From June 2013 to June 2014, the company eliminated about 2,600 positions, and campuses have been closed or are in the process of closing.

On May 6, 2015, EDMC announced it would begin closing 15 of its Art Institute locations, citing declining enrollment and restructuring.

The week of June 13, 2016, the corporation announced the planned closure of most of its Brown Mackie College campuses, with 22 of the 26 slated for closure.

In December 2016, the Southern Association of Colleges and Schools (SACS) announced that nine Art Institute campuses and all 15 South University campuses were placed on probation.

EDMC has faced significant financial problems, including a 99.9% drop in the value of its stock and a defaulted bond rating (to junk bond status). Under a pending agreement, shareholder stock value will be diluted an additional 96%. Moody's credit rating service in January 2015 dropped EDMC to its lowest rating, D-PD. EDMC's CEO, Edward West, resigned from the company on August 28, 2015, "to pursue other interests". The company was never profitable under his leadership. EDMC was delisted from the NASDAQ in November 2014.

EDMC has been the subject of several lawsuits and investigations alleging that the company made misleading claims in its efforts to recruit students.

On November 16, 2015, federal and state authorities announced a $95.5-million settlement resolving a whistleblower case in which former EDMC employees said the company was "illegally paying recruiters based on the number of students they enrolled".

As of 2016, EDMC announced that it was planning to close 19 of its Art Institute campuses and 22 of 26 Brown Mackie College campuses.

In 2017, EDMC sold its remaining Brown-Mackie campuses to Ross Medical Education Centers. In 2017, EDMC reported that it had sold the existing Art Institutes to The Dream Center Foundation, a Los Angeles-based Pentecostal organization. The sale was complete in October 2017.

In 2017, EDMC reported 109 locations, but more than 40 Brown Mackie Colleges and Art Institutes schools were in the process of closing at that time.

On October 18, 2017, EDMC announced it completed the sale of 31 Art Institute Schools, South University, and Argosy University to the Dream Center Foundation.

As of 30 June 2018, it was announced that EMDC filed for Chapter 7 bankruptcy and began to liquidate its assets.

In 2022, the EDMC schools Argosy University, The Art Institutes, Brown Mackie College, and South University were among 153 institutions included in student loan cancellation due to alleged fraud. The class action was brought by a group of more than 200,000 student borrowers, assisted by the Project on Predatory Student Lending, part of the Legal Services Center of Harvard Law School. A settlement was approved in August 2022, stating that the schools on the list were included "substantial misconduct by the listed schools, whether credibly alleged or in some instances proven." In April 2023, the Supreme Court rejected a challenge to the settlement and allowed to proceed the debt cancellation due to alleged fraud.

== Corporate affairs ==
EDMC's headquarters was located in Pittsburgh, Pennsylvania. The company's chairman, Mark A. McEachen, replaced Todd Nelson who was its chairman since July 2012. Until recently, its chief executive was Edward West, who resigned August 28, 2015; the company currently lists no CEO. The current board of directors has five members, all of whom have been with the company less than one year. Their Chairman, Mark McEachen, was nominated by preferred stockholders after the 2015 company-debt restructuring.

== Political activities ==
Starting in the late 2000s, EDMC engaged in lobbying and political advocacy. One such area was the Department of Education's June 2011 "gainful employment rule" which limited access to federal student loan money for students attending private-sector institutions with high post-graduation unemployment and default rates. EDMC opposed the rule's original draft, arguing that it limited minority and low-income students access to higher education.

EDMC established a PAC in 2009 to address politically important industry issues. During the 2010 elections its PAC donated more than $50,000 to organizations of both parties and to politicians including Democratic Congressman Jason Altmire, who opposed the "gainful employment rule", as well as to Republican Congressman John Kline, Democratic Senator Michael Bennet and the DCCC. An additional $850,000 was spent on 2010 lobbying efforts.

With other private-sector colleges and universities, EDMC helped form the Coalition for Educational Success in 2010. Represented by Lanny Davis, the CES lobbied for changes to the "gainful employment rule". The coalition persuaded the Department of Education to amend the rule, making vocational programs and programs with the highest debt and lowest loan repayment rates ineligible for federal loans. Private-sector providers were also given time to comply with the changes. EDMC Senior VP of Regulatory Affairs and Strategic Development, Anthony J. Guida Jr., served, by appointment, on the U.S. Department of Education's Advisory Committee on Student Financial Assistance from 2009 until September 2012. He previously served on the Board of the Association of Private Colleges and Universities, an advocacy organization, and currently serves on the organization's Federal Legislative Affairs Committee.

== Legal issues ==
=== Lawsuits regarding financial aid and recruitment practices ===
In 2007, two former EDMC recruiters filed a whistleblower complaint regarding recruitment and compensation practices at EDMC institutions. As a result of these complaints, the U.S. Department of Justice initiated a federal lawsuit in 2011 on behalf of eleven states and the District of Columbia. The civil lawsuit was filed under the False Claims Act, which allows whistleblowers to file lawsuits when they believe the federal government has been defrauded. The lawsuit seeks to recoup $11 billion, the amount of federal money EDMC institutions received in the form of federal student aid between 2003 and 2011. The Department of Justice argued that EDMC violated federal rules banning incentive-based compensation and therefore acquired the federal funds illegally. In response to the charges, EDMC stated that the compensation plan in question was in compliance with then-current federal rules and had been reviewed and approved by two education law firms. In May 2012, the charges that the compensation plan was illegal were dismissed with other charges allowed to stand. During this time EDMC settled with a former South University recruiter alleging similar practices. The details were not public.

A separate whistleblower lawsuit, filed by a former South University recruiter, was initiated in January 2010 and officially filed in March 2012. This lawsuit alleged that the company deliberately misclassified data to inflate the job-placement rates of its graduates and make the school more attractive to prospective students. Unlike the federal whistleblower lawsuit initiated in 2011, the U.S. Department of Justice has not joined the lawsuit. In October 2012, a U.S. magistrate judge dismissed allegations that the company failed to notify the U.S. government when students left their program and that the company misled prospective students about program costs. The remaining allegations were recommended for further review. In May 2013 U.S. Judge McVerry rejected EDMC's appeal to dismiss the case, and on May 11, 2014, he ordered full-blown pretrial discovery regarding the claims and defenses.

As of March 2013, both the federal whistleblower case begun in 2007 and the case initiated in 2010 are pending. EDMC has responded to the claims saying that both cases "are wholly without merit".

In December 2013, EDMC settled a civil claims suit filed by the Colorado Attorney General's Office for $3.3 million. The suit was brought following investigation by the attorney general's office, and alleged that the company's Argosy University in Denver violated the Colorado Consumer Protection Act by engaging in deceptive marketing, in particular misleading students about prospects for employment following graduation. Students had lodged complaints that the school had led them to believe it was pursuing accreditation from the American Psychological Association for its education in counseling psychology program, although it was not. Without the accreditation, students were not accepted to local internships that met the state's licensing standards. As part of the settlement, EDMC agreed to reimburse tuition fees for 66 students, end advertisement of its education in counseling psychology program in Denver as a psychology licensure-track program, and not enroll any further students to the program. As of January, 2015, the Ed.D. in Counseling Psychology was accepted for psychology licensure, and two graduates were advanced to Psychology Licensure candidacy, by the Colorado Department of Regulatory Agencies and the Colorado Psychology Board.

In November 2015, the US Justice Department announced that EDMC will pay nearly $95.5 million to settle claims the company used illegal incentives causing recruiters to use high-pressure tactics to convince students to enroll in the school. As part of the deal, the company will also forgive $102.9 million in loans students borrowed from the company to attend the school. The settlement resolves claims alleged in four whistleblower lawsuits, one of which the government intervened in. In addition, the deal covers allegations made as part of a consumer fraud investigation by the attorneys general of 39 states and the District of Columbia over claims the company misled students about job placement rates and other postgraduation outcomes while recruiting them. The loan forgiveness will affect 80,000 students and provide an average of $1,370 to each student.

=== Investigations ===
Four states initiated investigations in recent years with Florida in October 2010, New York, California and a subpoena of documents regarding Brown Mackie College from the Office of Consumer Protection of the Kentucky Attorney General in December 2010. In August 2010, EDMC and other private sector schools were investigated by the U.S. GAO, which reported that Argosy University (Chicago) recruiters misled undercover students about tuition and program quality. The GAO later revised parts of its original report from the investigation, which was the focus of testimony at a U.S. Senate HELP committee September 2010 hearing. A 2011 US DOJ report claimed that EDMC "created a 'boiler room' style sales culture and has made recruiting and enrolling new students the sole focus of its compensation system".

In January 2014, EDMC was among several for-profit schools approached by approximately a dozen attorneys general for information in an investigation of their practices.

EDMC's stock price has dropped more than 75% in the three months up to February 2014 as the company faced lower enrollments and investigations at state and federal levels, including investigations by states Attorneys General and the Securities and Exchange Commission. Information that EDMC provided to the Senate Harkin Commission indicates that of the 78,661 students who enrolled at EDMC-owned colleges in 2008–9, 62.1 percent, or 48,840 students, dropped out as of mid-2010. As of 2013, about 120,000 students attended Education Management Corporation-operated schools, a drop from its peak of 160,000.

In July 2016, a Maine Sunday Telegram expose found that former EDMC CEO John R. McKernan Jr. used a non-profit charity, the EDMC Foundation, to skirt federal 90/10 regulations. The expose was based on three-month investigation.

=== Dismissal of shareholder lawsuit ===
In 2010, several EDMC shareholders initiated a lawsuit alleging that EDMC had misled investors prior to the company's 2009 IPO, causing investors to lose money when the company's stock fell in 2010. The lawsuit was later joined by EDMC shareholders OPPRS and SEPTA. The case was dismissed by a federal judge in September 2011, as the shareholders were unable to show that the company had lied to investors.

=== Labor issues ===
In April 2016, two former teachers at the Art Institute of California sued EDMC for not giving them a minimum wage and for not offering adequate rest periods in order to 'reduce compensation and increase its own profits.'

=== Financial issues ===
In February 2014, Standard & Poor's cut EDMC's credit rating to CCC+ because of declining enrollment. Moody's credit rating service in January 2015 dropped EDMC to its lowest rating, D-PD, which it defines as "Corporate families rated D are in default on all of their long-term debt obligations." In 2014, EDMC's major creditor, KKR took control over EDMC's assets.

As of July 30, 2016, EDMC sold as an over the counter stock at approximately one cent per share.

=== Consumer fraud lawsuits ===
In 2016, former nursing students at Brown Mackie College in Tucson, Arizona sued the school, alleging that the poor training they received left them unable to be gainfully employed. The plaintiffs expected to graduate in 2015 until a state nursing board investigation found some of the school's faculty were unqualified and were using veterinary supplies to teach students how to care for human patients. The Arizona nursing board barred the Brown Mackie students from taking the practical nurses licensing exam and ordered the school to retrain the students at the company's expense.

=== Employee-ADR lawsuits ===
By the end of 2016, EDMC's legal perils had ensnared even the company's outside legal counsel at the Pittsburgh-based global law firm Reed Smith LLP. Advised by Attorney Katherine Ryan before two federal judges in discrimination lawsuits dating to August 2012, the company was defeated when the U.S. Court of Appeals for the Third Circuit issued a sweeping October 18 order invalidating an alternative dispute resolution policy superimposed retroactively on the company's employees; EDMC had tried to bar aggrieved employees from filing suit in any court for any purpose. The 3-0 panel found that the policy had been illegally superimposed without employees' assent and thereby reinstated a pair of federal cases against the Art Institute of Pittsburgh demanding more than $4 million in damages and alleging legal malpractice inside EDMC.
