= Prequel (mobile application) =

Image editing and social networking company

Prequel Inc.
- Type: Private company
- Industry: Internet
- Founded: 2018; 8 years ago
- Founders: Timur Khabirov; Serge Aliseenko
- Headquarters: New York, New York, U.S.
- Products: Photo and video editing app
- Number of employees: ≈200
- Website: www.prequel.app

Prequel, Inc. is an American technology company and mobile app developer known for developing the Prequel mobile application, which enables editing photos and videos with filters and effects generated using artificial intelligence. Prequel was founded in 2018 by Serge Aliseenko and Timur Khabirov, who currently serves as the company's CEO. It is headquartered in New York City. As of August 2022, it had been downloaded more than 100 million times.

== History ==
In 2016, entrepreneur Timur Khabirov and investor Serge Aliseenko registered a US corporation named AIAR Labs Inc, which was developing AR solutions as an outsourced contractor. Of several proprietary products, Prequel was selected for beta-testing as a product focused on editing photos and videos. In 2018, Prequel was released on the Apple App Store. The launch cost $3 million USD, financed with the founders’ personal funds. The first release included approximately 10 filters for photos and the same amount of effects that augmented images with rose petals, rain and snow, VHS and film reel simulations, glitch, grain, sun puddles, and lomography. By June 2020, the app had also been released for Android.

In 2021, Prequel founders Timur Khabirov and Serge Aliseenko launched a venture studio for startups working with artificial, computer vision, and AR-based visual art.

In December 2022, Prequel reached the number 14 slot on the global rankings for Apple App Store’s Top Charts and the number 5 slot on the App Store’s U.S. charts.

In March 2023, Prequel launched a new app called Artique, which is an AI-powered image editing app for businesses. Artique provides advertising and marketing graphic design using ready-made templates that users can customize, while giving suggestions and visual cues through artificial intelligence.

Prequel was also one of the companies participating in discussions about artificial intelligence at SXSW 2023.

== Features ==
Prequel describes its app as an "Aesthetic Pic Editor. The app uses artificial intelligence to create and edit content. Prequel can be used to touch up faces on images and videos and can also tie various decorative elements to certain points on the human body and face.

Prequel filters include the "Cartoon" filter, which converts selfies into cartoon-style pictures. Other filters include Kidcore, Dust, Grain, Fisheye, Retro Style, Miami, Disco, and VHS-style filters, as well as the ability to create Renaissance-style pictures. Prequel also gives users the ability to apply color correction tools and to make moving images with 3D effects out of 2D images.

Prequel allows users to take photos and videos directly through the app and apply filters and effects in real time. The app also comes with manual editing options for photos, such as adjusting the brightness and/or exposure and cropping photos, as well as an option to automatically apply adjustments.

The Prequel app uses the Core ML, MNN, and TFLight frameworks to work with its neural networks. Some AI solutions are launched server-side, and some on the user's mobile device. A resulting photo or video edited with the app is called "a prequel."

The app daily generates over 2 million such prequels, which are published by users in Instagram, TikTok, and other social media. As of 2022, the app has more than 800 filters and effects, along with video templates and support for GIFs and stickers.

Prequel is free-to-use, but has a premium version that gives users access to more effects, filters, and beauty tools. Since its launch in 2018, Prequel has been downloaded more than 100 million times.

== See also ==
- VSCO
- Picsart
