= Secchi =

Secchi may refer to:

== People with the surname ==
- Angelo Secchi (1818–1878), Italian astronomer
- Giuseppe Secchi (1931–2018), Italian footballer
- Luciano Secchi (born 1939), Italian comic book writer and publisher
- Luigi Secchi (1853-1921), Italian sculptor
- Marco Secchi, Italian photographer
- Serafino Secchi (died 1628), Italian clergyman

== Other uses ==
- Secchi (lunar crater)
- Secchi (Martian crater)
- Secchi depth, a measure of turbidity
- Secchi disk, an instrument used to measure turbidity
- SECCHI (Sun Earth Connection Coronal and Heliospheric Investigation), an instrument package on each of the STEREO spacecraft
