= Blame The Monkey =

Blame The Monkey was an American blog focusing on travel photography inspiration and education, particularly regarding an image editing technique used in photographic post processing that it called" Advanced Dynamic Blending." As of 2026, its website was down.

The site was voted "Best New Blog for Photographers" by Scott Kelby in his roundup of 55 best of things in 2011. The blog's author Elia Locardi was voted ninth in USA Today 10Best's "Top Travel Photography Bloggers" in a 2014 Readers' Choice Poll.

Founded in 2010 by Elia Locardi and Naomi Locardi, the blog shares stories of the photographers’ experiences being global nomads living on the road and the techniques used in the creation of the travel photography images. The blog also shares photography tutorials.
