= Artifact Uprising =

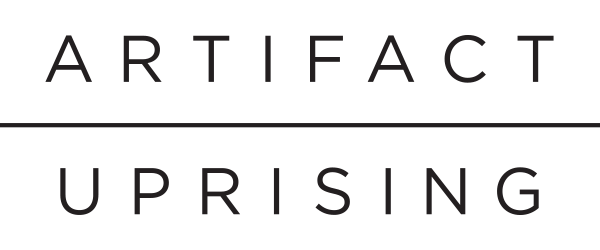
- Company type: Private
- Founded: October 2012
- Founders: Katie Thurmes; Jenna Walker; Matt Walker
- Headquarters: Denver, Colorado, U.S.
- Area served: United States
- Key people: Brad Kopitz (CEO)
- Website: artifactuprising.com

Artifact Uprising is a company that specializes in the creation of custom photo books, prints, and other photo products. It is based in Denver, Colorado.

== History ==
Artifact Uprising was founded in October 2012 by Katie Thurmes, Jenna Walker, and Matt Walker as a custom photo album printer. The company's early growth was influenced by its exposure on Pinterest. After the platform's launch, its website was pinned by a user and subsequently re-pinned by several of Pinterest's members, drawing attention to its minimalist photo books.

In 2015, Artifact Uprising was included in Oprah's Favorite Things list.

In January 2015, Artifact Uprising was acquired by VSCO. However, in 2017, company management re-acquired it from VSCO with funding from Digital Fuel Capital.

== Platform ==
Artifact Uprising's platform organizes photographs into structured layouts for photo books, prints, and wall art. The materials used include book pages made from recycled or Forest Stewardship Council-certified paper, as well as calendars crafted from beetle-kill pine.

In 2013, a mobile app was developed that allowed users to organize and select images from their mobile devices to transform into physical items such as soft and hardcover photo books, calendars, and wooden boxes crafted from beetle-kill pine.
