= Hovhannes Avoyan =

Armenian-American entrepreneur and investor

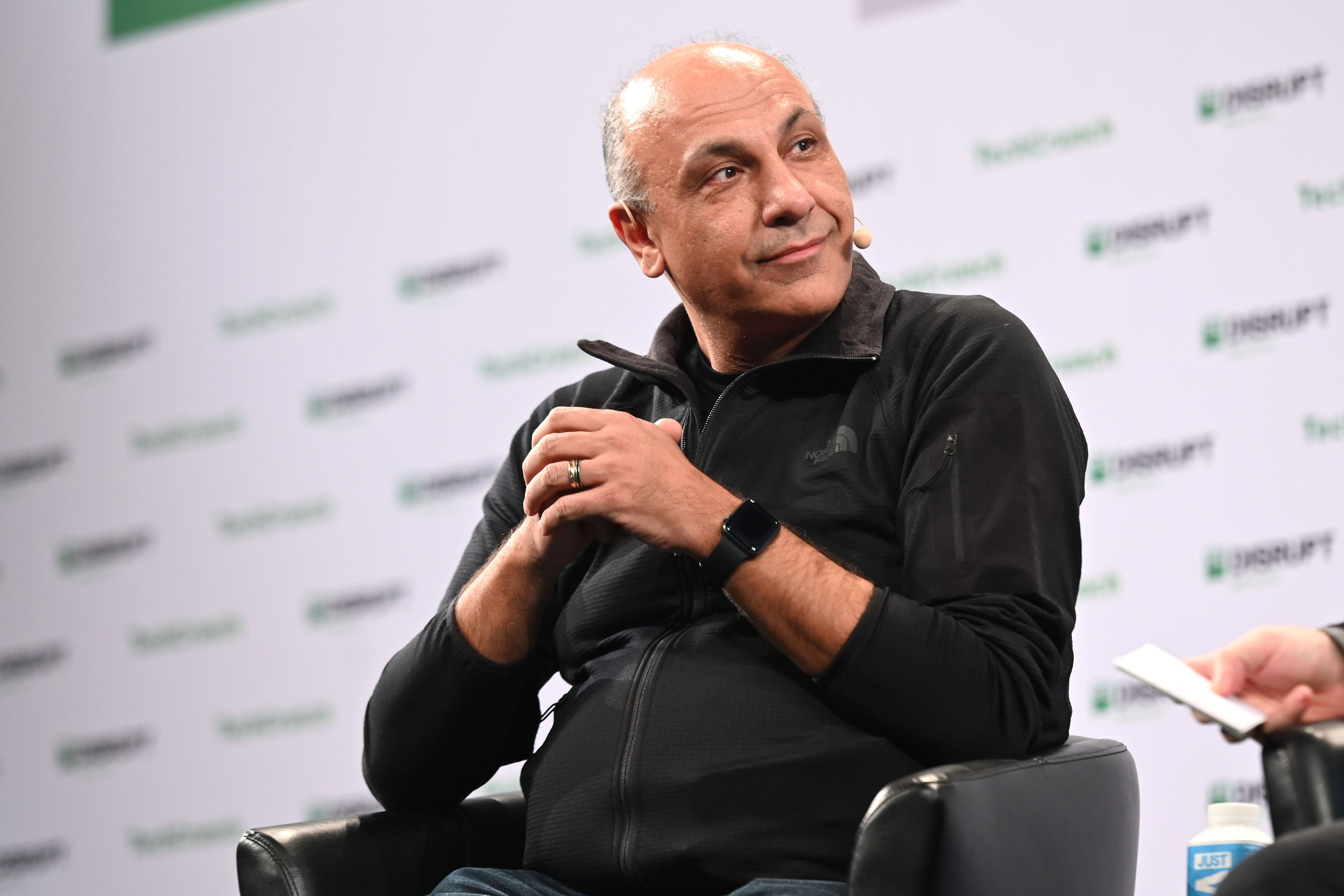
- Avoyan at TechCrunch Disrupt Berlin 2019
- Born: 23 March 1965 (age 61); Yerevan, Armenian SSR, Soviet Union
- Education: State Engineering University of Armenia (BS in Computer Science); American University of Armenia (M PSIA)
- Occupation: CEO of Picsart
- Organization: Picsart
- Known for: CEO and co-founder of Picsart

Hovha'nnes Avoyan (Hovhannes Avoyan, Armenian: Հովհաննես Ավոյան; born March 23, 1965), is an Armenian-American serial entrepreneur, investor and scholar. He is the co-founder and CEO of Picsart, a suite of online photo and video editing applications. He also served as President of the Union of Information Technology Enterprises of Armenia (UITE) from its inception in 2000 until 2015. Hovhannes Avoyan is a member of the American University of Armenia Corporation Board of Trustees.

== Early life and education ==
Hovhannes Avoyan was born in 1965 in Yerevan, Soviet Armenia. He graduated from the State Engineering University of Armenia with a B.S. degree in Computer Science in 1987 and received a Masters in Political Science and International Affairs (M PSIA) from the American University of Armenia in 1995. He is also a 2005 graduate of Harvard Business School's Bertelsmann Senior Executive's program.

== Career ==
In 1996, Avoyan founded CEDIT, a software development services company, which was acquired by mobile communications software developer Brience in 2000.

In 2005, Avoyan founded and served as CEO of Sourcio, a software development and system integration service provider acquired by software developer HelpSystems in 2016.

In 2007, Avoyan founded and served as General Manager of Monitis Inc., which was acquired by TeamViewer/GFI Software) in 2011.

In 2011, with his friend Artavazd Mehrabyan, Avoayan founded Picsart, a social photo and video editing platform, and became the company's CEO. Picsart's software reportedly has more than 150 million monthly active users, and has been downloaded 1 billion times as of September 2020.

== Accolades ==
In 2016, Avoyan received the Distinguished Alumni Award from the American University of Armenia. In 2019, The Armenian Trade Network named Avoyan as the recipient of its Global Achievement Award.

== Philanthropy ==
Avoyan supports AI development in Armenia by establishing schools and best practices in the country to help its data scientists compete globally.

== Artificial intelligence ==
Hovhannes is an author and speaker on artificial intelligence and advocates the establishment of machine learning and data science schools in Armenia.
