= Art Institute of Fort Lauderdale =

Former for-profit art school as part of The Art Institutes

The Art Institute of Fort Lauderdale
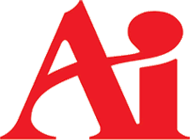
- The universal Art Institute logo
- Active: 1968–2018
- Founders: Mark. K. Wheeler, George P. Butterly
- Affiliations: The Art Institutes; ACF; ACICS
- Faculty: 113
- Administrative staff: 100+
- Students: 1,000+
- Undergraduates: 1,000+
- Location: Fort Lauderdale, Florida, United States; 26.100°N 80.122°W
- Colors: Red and Black
- Website: www.artinstitutes.edu/fort-lauderdale

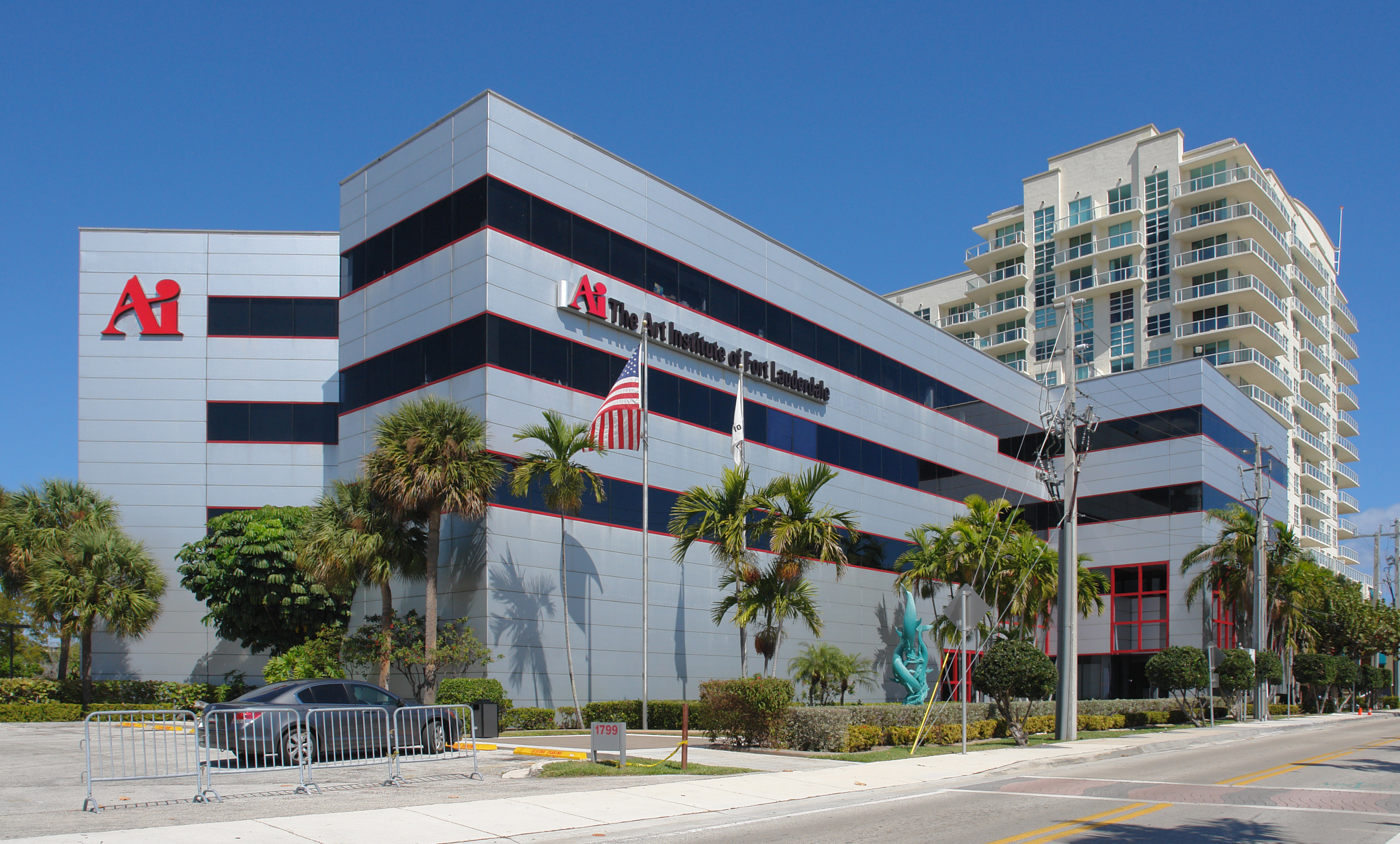
The Art Institute of Fort Lauderdale, February 2009

The Art Institute of Fort Lauderdale is a former for-profit art and culinary school in Fort Lauderdale, Florida which closed in 2018. The school was one of a number of Art Institutes, a franchise of for-profit art colleges with many branches in North America, owned and operated by Education Management Corporation (EDMC). EDMC owned the college from 1973 until 2017, when, facing declining enrollment, multiple fraud charges brought by faculty and students, and accreditation issues at some of its schools, the company sold the Art Institute of Fort Lauderdale, along with other properties, to Dream Center Education, a Los Angeles-based Pentecostal organization. Dream Center Education planned to operate the school, along with others it acquired, as a non-profit. The plan proved unsustainable, with Dream Center permanently closing 18 Art Institute schools, including Art Institute of Fort Lauderdale, at the end of 2018.

== History ==
=== Beginning ===
The Art Institute of Fort Lauderdale was envisioned and realized by George P Butterly under Mark K. Wheeler, owner and officially opened for admission in September 1968 in eastern Las Olas Boulevard, Fort Lauderdale. Butterly established location, recruited staff, provided advertisement and news stories across the country to entice students to attend the Art Institute in the Ft Lauderdale area. It would be the second Art Institute establishment following the Art Institute of Pittsburgh, founded in 1921 where Butterly initially was head of public relations and who helped build the Art Institute brand; initially only offering diplomas in Commercial Art, Interior Design, and Fashion Illustration and remaining unaccredited. This status would span a duration of 18 months until in April 1971 when the college would be granted accreditation by the Accrediting Commission for Trade and Technical Schools of the Career College Association. Two years later, in November 1973, the school was purchased from Wheeler by the Education Management Corporation (EDMC).

=== Growth ===
In February 1975, two years after its purchase by the EDMC, the school became licensed by the State Board of Independent Postsecondary Vocational, Technical, Trade, and Business Schools. It wouldn't be for another four years in 1979, however, that the State of Florida officially recognized the school and gave it authorization to award Associate of Science degrees. For the next seven years, the college did not see any significant changes, until in May 1986 when the decision was made to relocate the school from Las Olas Boulevard to 1799 SE 17th Street. The following year, the State Board of Independent Colleges and Universities granted the school authorization to award Bachelor's degrees and in 1989, the college broadened its facilities at 1650 SE 17 Street; establishing the modern campus it had until closing.

== Campus ==
The Art Institute of Fort Lauderdale campus offered programs in Design, Media Arts, Culinary and Fashion, and had a student-run restaurant named the Chef's Palette. The school's library was the Nevin C. Meinhardt Memorial Library and its gallery, which was open to the public, is named after the school's founder, Mark K. Wheeler.

== Notable alumni ==
- Farrah Abraham – semi-professional porn and reality TV star
- Chari Cuthbert – Jewelry designer
- David Diaz – children's book illustrator
- Tony DiTerlizzi – fantasy artist known for his work in the Spiderwick Chronicles
- Sam Fogarino – drummer of Interpol
- Carol Guzy – four-time Pulitzer Prize-winning photojournalist
- Elia Locardi – travel photographer
- Scott Putesky - guitarist and founding member of rock band Marilyn Manson
- Lisa Pickens Quinn – actress, author and set designer
- Roy Rossello – former member of Latin boy band Menudo, singer, actor, host and businessman
- Bruce Straley – video game director, artist, and designer
- Venus Williams – fashion designer and professional tennis player

== See also ==
- American Culinary Federation
