= Photowalking =

Communal activity of camera enthusiasts

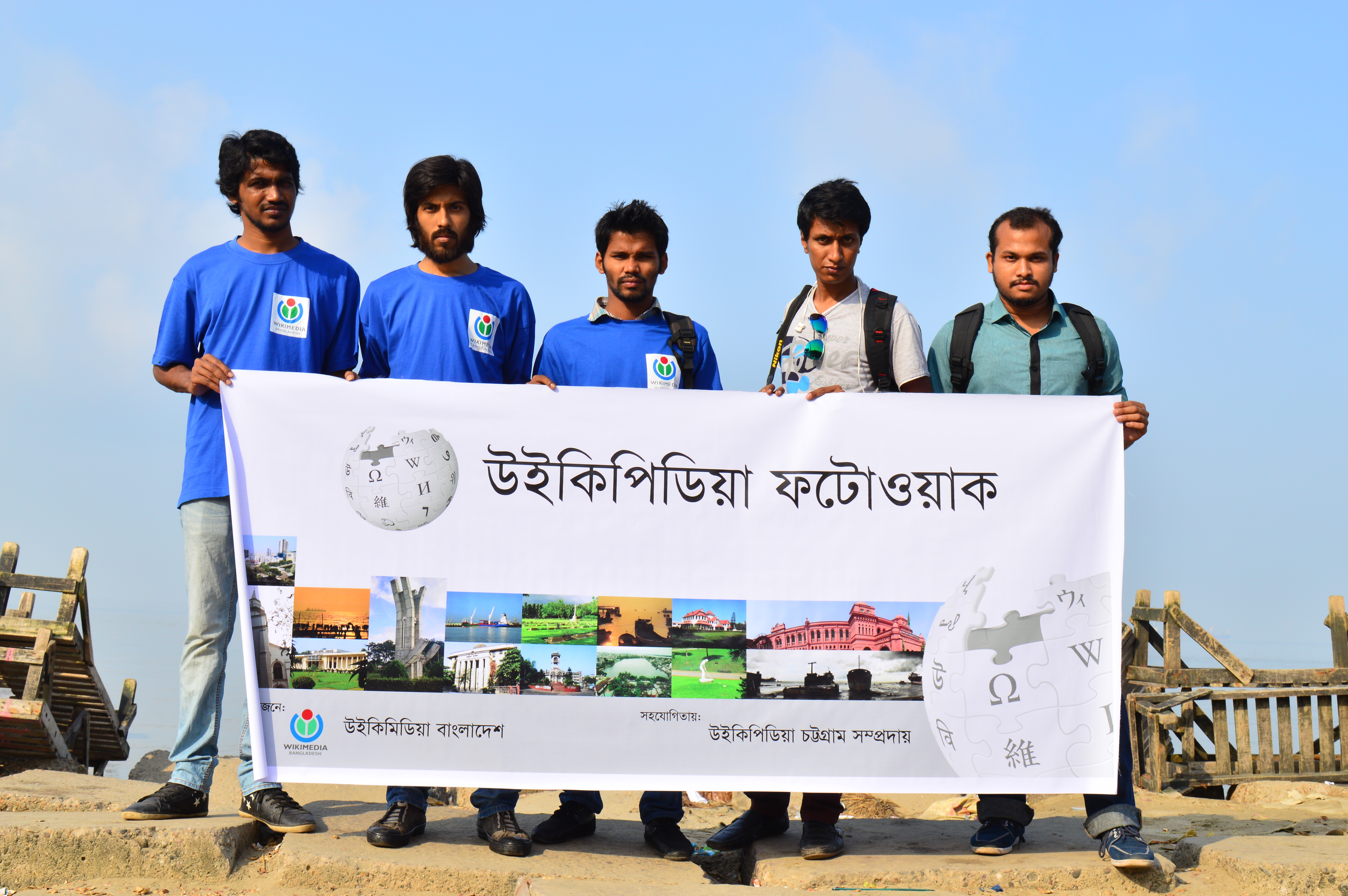
Wikimedians at Wikipedia Photowalk in Chittagong

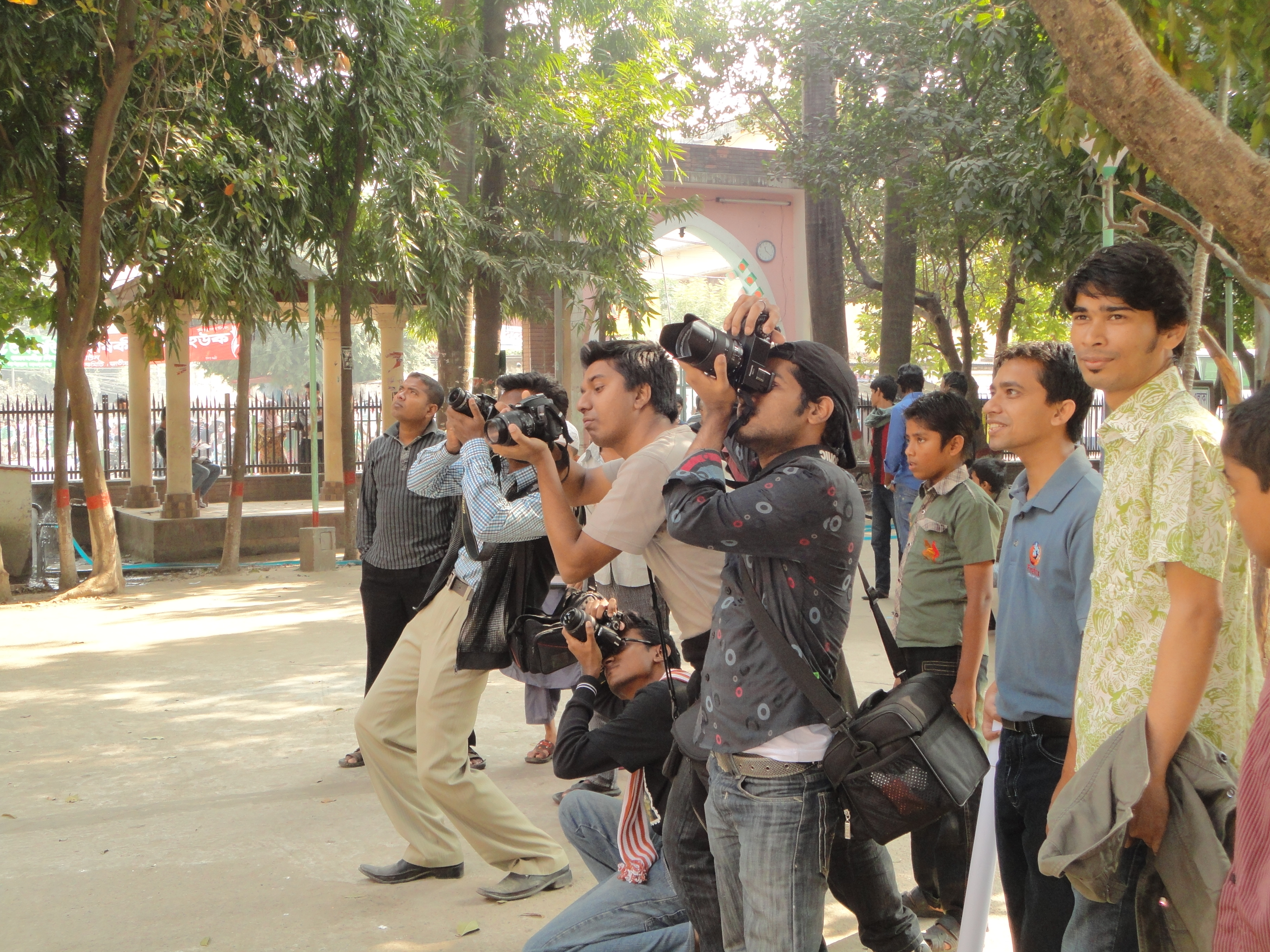
A group of photo-walkers in Dhaka, Bangladesh taking photographs for Wikimedia Commons.

Photowalking is a communal activity of camera enthusiasts who gather in a group to walk around with a camera for the main purpose of taking pictures of things that interest them. The word is sometimes used incorrectly in the marketing title of a photography class or workshop. Although the term implies the single activity of taking pictures while walking, the more modern use of the term specifically relates to a communal activity of camera enthusiasts.

The activity is typically organized by camera clubs, ad hoc gatherings from online forums such as Facebook or Twitter, usually led by experienced photographers and sometimes are sponsored by commercial organizations. When Instagram had a community development team, they encouraged global photowalks called Worldwide Instameet, and this introduced photowalks to spread even wider globally. Since the COVID-19 pandemic some photographers and bloggers also started organizing virtual photowalks within their community, sharing their personal experiences around the globe.

== Photowalks vs street photography ==
Photowalking is sometimes compared to street photography, a type of documentary photography activity. However, although a person participating in a photowalk may practice street photography, they are not limited to that scope; they may also practice Macro photography, Architectural photography, Nature photography, etc. Also, street photography is typically an activity practiced as an individual photographer rather than in a group.

== History ==
The activity of walking and photographing with a group of other photographers dates back more than 100 years. An early example of photography clubs is The Camera Club of New York, established in 1884. The Eastman Kodak Company of New York launched the Brownie camera in 1900. The camera sold for $1 and put photography in the hands of the average consumer. As photography became part of people's daily lives, photography clubs such as societies and associations, proliferated around the world to support this emerging technology.

Adding to the confusion is that "photo walk" and "photowalk" are used interchangeably. Scott Kelby, one of the most well-known photowalking event leaders, has used both forms of the word since 2007.

== Social and cultural implications ==
Because it is so tightly coupled with the social aspect of group photography, photowalking can have benefits other than just exercise and photography practice. For example, in some situations, there is safety in numbers and the photography experience can be more enjoyable in a group.

Without tight controls and good organization, events can get out of control and in some cases involve the police.

Many photowalk organizations also participate in charities. Since 2008, Scott Kelby's Worldwide Photo Walk has sponsored the Springs Of Hope Orphanage in Kenya. Other organizations donate money to the locations or museums they visit.
