= VSCO =

Photography mobile app

- Screenshot of the mobile app, VSCO
- Developer: Visual Supply Company
- Release: 2011

Stable release(s)
- Android: 417.1 / April 8, 2025; 18 months ago
- iOS: 418.0.0 / April 8, 2025; 18 months ago
- Operating system: Android 6+, iOS 15+
- Size: 66.36 MB (Android); 154.5 MB (iOS)
- License: Commercial software as a service
- Website: vsco.co

VSCO (/ˈvɪskoʊ/), formerly known as VSCO Cam, is a photography mobile app available for iOS and Android devices. The app was created by Joel Flory and Greg Lutze. The VSCO app allows users to capture photos in the app and edit them, using preset filters and editing tools.

== History ==
Visual Supply Company was founded by Joel Flory and Greg Lutze in California, in 2011. VSCO was launched in 2012. It raised $40 million from investors in May 2014. In 2017, VSCO launched a subscription model. As of 2018, Visual Supply Company has $90 million in funding from investors and over 2 million paying members. In 2019, VSCO acquired Rylo, a video editing startup founded by the original developer of Instagram’s Hyperlapse. Visual Supply Company has locations in Oakland, California, where it is headquartered, and Chicago, Illinois. In December 2020 VSCO acquired AI-powered video editing app Trash.

In April 2018, VSCO reached over 30 million users.

In September 2023, Eric Wittman was appointed as the new CEO and co-founder Joel Flory became executive chairman.

== Usage ==
Users must register an account to use the app.

Photos can be taken or imported from the camera roll, as well as short videos or animated GIFs (known in the app as DSCO; iOS only). The user can edit their photos through various preset filters, or through the "toolkit" feature which allows finer adjustments to fade, clarity, skin tone, tint, sharpness, saturation, contrast, temperature, exposure, and other properties. Users have the option of posting their photos to their profile, where they can also add captions and hashtags. Photos can also be exported back into the camera roll or shared with other social networking services. The users also have an option to edit their own videos from their camera roll with the VSCO yearly membership, but they are not able to post camera roll as VSCO Film X videos to their account on VSCO.

JPEG and raw image files can be used.

== In popular culture ==
VSCO's Oakland headquarters was a key filming location for Boots Riley's 2018 film Sorry to Bother You.

== See also ==
- Prequel
- Picsart
- VSCO girl
