= Elia Locardi =

American photographer

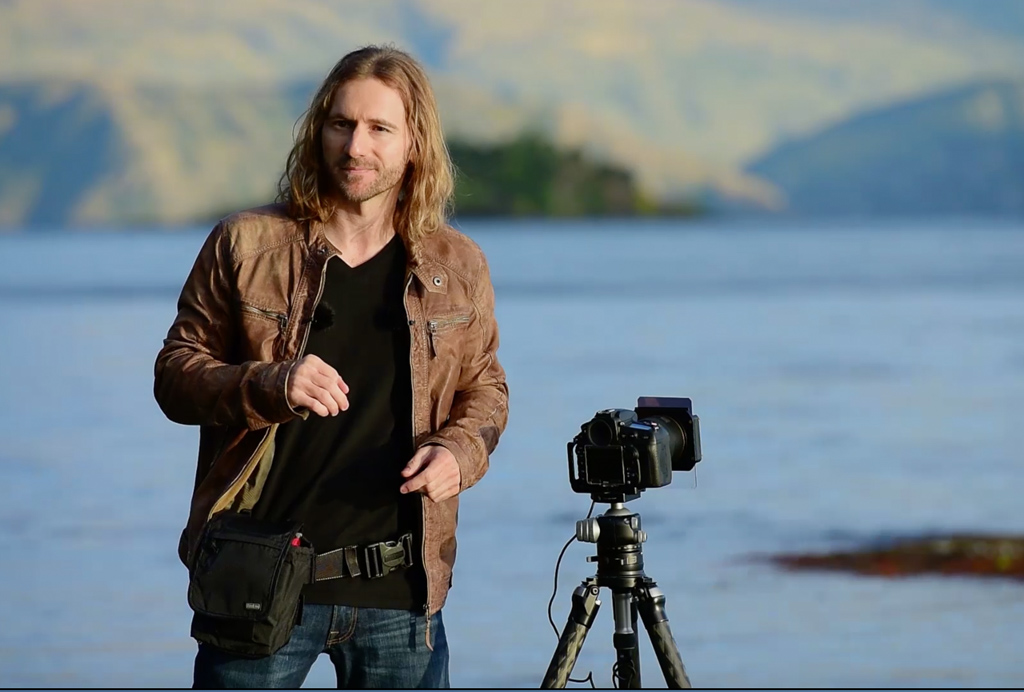
Locardi teaching in the field

Elia Locardi (born July 13, 1980) is an American photographer specialized in travel photography, landscape photography, aerial photography and videography. He is also a photography blogger, educator, speaker and entrepreneur. Locardi often works together with his wife, Naomi Locardi.

== Life and work ==
Locardi graduated in media art and animation from the Art Institute of Ft Lauderdale in 2002. After a decade working in the media arts and animation industry, and travelling, he launched a career as a location-independent digital nomad photographer.

His photographic themes have been natural landscapes, cityscapes, ancient architecture and world heritage sites. His work has been published in National Geographic, Digital Photo Magazine, Digital Camera Magazine, and Professional Photographer Magazine.

=== Aerial photography ===
Locardi was still photographer for the documentary film How I Became an Elephant (2012), and captured drone footage for a documentary film on Bhutan's annual Tour of the Dragon bicycle race (2015). His drone pictures and footage have been favourably reviewed in specialized online and book sources.

=== Teaching ===
With his wife Naomi Locardi, in 2010 he founded a photography-oriented website Blame The Monkey, an American blog focusing on travel photography. The blog shares stories of the photographers' experiences as global nomads and the techniques used in photographing and post-processing. Blame The Monkey was voted "Best New Blog for Photographers" by Scott Kelby, in his roundup of 55 best of things in 2011.

Alone or in association, Locardi has participated in the development of tutorials and other educational material on photography and postprocessing techniques as applied to travel, landscape, cityscape, desert nightscape, and astro-photography.

In 2016 Locardi was chosen by Kelby as one of five best photography workshop teachers.

=== Video series ===
Moments in Time is a serial travel show filmed in 2019 in Singapore, Malaysia, Japan, The Netherlands, Czech Republic, Italy and Spain. In addition to displaying tourist attractions, the show includes interviews with and the work of local experts and artists in the world of photography. Season two of the series was shot at the end of 2019 in the Philippines, Cambodia and Indonesia, but its continuation has been put on hold due to the COVID-19 pandemic.

Kentucky in Focus is a short-form episodic series sponsored by the Kentucky Department of Tourism, in which Locardi's team tour Kentucky’s most iconic sites in 11 episodes exploring the state’s horse country, outdoor city life, water, food and bourbon.
