= Chari Cuthbert =

Jamaican-born jewelry designer (born 1984)

- Born: 1984 (age 41–42)
- Occupation: Jewelry designer

Chari Cuthbert is a Jamaican-born, self-taught jewelry designer. Cuthbert is the founder and creative director of the jewelry company ByChari.

== Early life and education ==
Cuthbert, a West Indian woman, was born in 1984 to Jamaican parents. She graduated from The Art Institute of Fort Lauderdale with an Associate of Science Degree in Photography.

== ByChari (company) ==
Before she founded ByChari in 2012, she moved to Hawaii and later in 2016 to Los Angeles. She started her business with $100 and is its sole owner. Her jewelry was first sold by Owens & Co. in Downtown Honolulu. She started selling her jewelry exclusively on her website when she moved to L.A.

In August 2020, First Lady Michelle Obama wore a necklace designed by Cuthbert for her 2020 Democratic National Convention speech. The Vote necklace went viral during Obama's speech and, according to CNN, was a top-trending search on Google during the last hour of the convention on August 17, 2020. Cuthbert designed the Vote necklace in 2016 and then started marketing it for the 2018 midterm elections. Obama's stylist, Meredith Koop, ordered the Vote necklace for Obama.

As of 2021, she had a team of ten female employees working for her in Los Angeles.

Her designs have been worn by Michelle Obama, Kate Hudson, Jessica Alba, Rocky Barnes, Rose Huntington-Whiteley, Aimee Song and Chiara Ferragni.
