= Marco Secchi =

Italian photographer

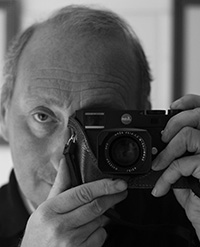
- Born: Venice, Italy
- Occupation: Photographer
- Organization: Awakening Collective
- Agent: Getty Images
- Website: marcosecchi.com

Marco Secchi is an Italian photographer and photo journalist. He works for Getty Images, worked for Corbis and specializes in political and social events, establishing himself as a significant voice in visual storytelling, capturing pivotal moments and figures across the globe. Secchi was the mind and one of the founding members of the alternative photography collective, #Awakening. He is also a teacher offering photography workshops or photowalks of locations like Venice, Milan, Scotland, Slovenia, Croatia, and Italy.

== Career ==
Secchi is a native of Venice, Italy, although he has lived most of his youth in Milan, moving later to France, Switzerland, Scotland, The Isle of Scalpay, London and now lives in Slovenia and Hungary. He began his career as a photographer in 1980 and was inspired to do so by other photographers like Tullio Farabola, Gianni Berengo Gardin and Elliott Erwitt. Over the course of his career, he has taken photographs of prominent events and people, including political figures like Pope Francis, sportspeople like LeBron James and Mike Tyson, celebrities like George Clooney, and royalty like Queen Elizabeth II. He has also covered worldwide events like the Costa Concordia disaster, the Bosnian War, and the recent Syrian refugee migration through the Balkans. He is an editorial photographer for Getty Images.

Secchi is one of the founding members of the alternative photography collective, #Awakening. The group seeks to create social change through photographic art. Secchi is also a photography teacher and offers photography workshops in a variety of places throughout Europe.

In addition to his editorial and documentary work, Secchi is recognized for his street photography, particularly in Venice, Ljubljana, Budapest and other European cities. His work emphasizes the interplay of light and shadow, composition, and human presence in urban settings. His black-and-white street photography has been featured in the press and exhibitions, including a show in Ljubljana in December 2022, and in publications such as Street Photography Gallery, which highlighted his approach and visual storytelling techniques.

He works with different camera brands including Fujifilm and Leica and held several photographic exhibitions. His photograph "Bajansenye Abandoned Checkpoint" is part of "The Absence of Paths" Exhibition for the Tunisian Pavilion at the 57th International Art Exhibition Venice Biennale. Additionally, he has compiled few books. One is a book of photographs called The Venice Carnival and the other is a French-language guide called Le grand guide de Venise and few of black and white photography. Secchi's photographs have appeared in many publications including Pope Francis: A Photographic Portrait of the People's Pope, At This Moment: The Story of Michael Buble, The Rough Guide to the Italian Lakes, Lonely Planet Venice & the Veneto, and Women Writers who Changed the World.

== Books ==
- The Venice Carnival (2011)
- Le grand guide de Venise : Sur les pas de Canaletto et des maîtres vénitiens (2012)
- Venice and the Big Ships (2016)
- Venice in Black and White (2016) (2020 II Edition. 2022 III Edition)
- Artisans of Venice (2016) (2020 II Edition. 2022 III Edition)
- Ljubljana in Monochrome (2017) (2021 II Edition)
- Poveglia: a Mysterious Island: The Haunted Island in the Venetian Lagoon (2021)
- Elizabeth: Photographs of Her Majesty Queen Elizabeth II by Marco Secchi (2022)

== Workshops ==
He runs talks, Workshops and Photowalks in Venice, Milan, Slovenia and Hungary.

== Exhibitions and awards ==
- 2017 Saint Petersburg Russia Marco Secchi Exhibition "Venice Shrouded in Fog'
- 2017 Magazzini del Sale, Venice, Italy
- 2018 Ljubljana Slovenia Mini Theatre
- 2018 Silver Chromatic Awards – International Color Photography Contest
- 2022 Ljubljana Slovenia Krizevniska "Ljubljana in Monochrome"
