= Fotor =

Photo editing software

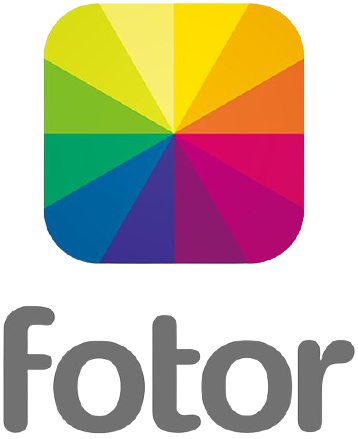
- Type: Private
- Industry: Software
- Founded: 2012
- Founder: Tony Duan
- Headquarters: Chengdu, China
- Area served: Worldwide
- Products: Fotor; Clipfly
- Owner: Chengdu Everimaging Science and Technology Co., Ltd.
- Number of employees: 100
- Website: www.fotor.com www.clipfly.ai

Fotor is an online photo editing software developed by Chengdu Everimaging Science and Technology Co., Ltd., launched in 2012. It offers a complete set of tools for both individuals and companies to effortlessly edit photos and design graphics.

The software uses a drag-and-drop interface intended to simplify the photo editing process. Fotor operates on a freemium model and has expanded its services over the years to include AI photo editing tools, AI image and video generation powered by artificial intelligence. Until now, Fotor has more 800M+ users around 200+ countries and regions.

Fotor's software is available on mobile devices, desktop computers, and online as a web app. It offers image editing tools and features for users to edit and enhance photos. Fotor One-Tap Photo Enhancer is a tool that is designed to improve image quality and fix common imaging problems. Fotor GoArt is a tool to turn photos into classical painting style artwork. Fotor AI Background Remover is a tool that allows users to remove backgrounds from their images. Fotor AI Image Generator is a tool that lets users make art with words.

== History ==
2012

Fotor was founded in Chengdu, China, by Tony Duan in 2012. He received his PhD from the University of Nottingham. His fields of research includes computer vision and digital image processing.

Founded in 2012, Fotor Photo Editor can be used online or downloaded as a mobile and computer application compatible with Windows, macOS, Android, and iOS. It is used to adjust and alter images, both photographic and non-photographic. As of 2014, the apps were supported in fourteen languages.

2013–2015

In addition to basic photo editing tools such as cropping, red eye removal, the use of stickers and overlays, photo unblurring, and aperture addition, Fotor can also be used for graphic design and collage making. Though the initial app is free, some options are only available through an in-app purchase, or via the Fotor Pro version. Fotor also has a module dedicated to making collages and smart templates with support for image layers.

2016–2021

In 2016, Fotor updated its HDR curves adjustment to its platform and launched Goart tool for transforming images into different art styles.

In late 2017, Fotor added a custom aspect ratio option to its collage function and altered its tilt-shift algorithm.

From 2017 to 2021, Fotor released a suite of graphic design tools and templates for creating posters, greeting cards, and social media content.

2022

In September 2022, Fotor launched a series of AI photo editing tools, including the AI photo enhancer, AI background remover, and AI object remover, all powered by artificial intelligence.

Fotor's AI photo enhancer makes it easy to improve image quality.

Fotor's AI background remover and background generator automatically remove the background from an image and generate new background.

Fotor's AI object remover for removing unwanted objects from images with great ease.

In December 2022, Fotor launched an AI image generator that converts text descriptions into AI-generated images, including realistic photos, logos, 3D characters, and digital illustrations.

2023–2024

In June 2023, Fotor launched an AI headshot generator that transforms selfies into realistic and professional headshots in seconds.

In February 2024, Fotor expanded its AI generation capabilities from images to videos and also enhanced its AI video editing tools.

Fotor's AI video generator for generating videos from descriptions and images.

Fotor's AI video editor, such as video enhancer, video background remover for enhancing video quality and removing background from video.

2025

In February 2025, Fotor launched a new API program for developers, allowing partners to implement Fotor's AI photo editing features on their platforms.

In early August 2025, Fotor released “Sisi”, an AI agent that also supports text to image editing, text-to-image and text-to-video generation, allowing users to describe edits rather than choose tools step by step.

2026

In May 2026, Fotor unveiled its AI Vibe Marketing Platform for Performance—introducing Product Visuals and Growth Visuals to power a complete visual workflow for real business impact.

Fotor defines Vibe Marketing as A visual-driven approach where you bring the idea, and AI scales it into on-brand, studio-quality visual content that actually sells—across every channel, instantly.

== Product ==
Fotor develops mobile apps and web browser tools for editing photos and videos. The apps are available on iOS and Android mobile devices.

Fotor AI Art Photo Editor - a photo app with basic tools and AI tools to add filters and enhance images, even videos.

GoArt - an app for applying all kinds of AI art effects to turn images into artwork.

PortraitMe - an app for beautifying portraits.

Clipfly - an app for AI video generation.
