= Radiant Photo =

Radiant Photo 2 is an AI-assisted photo-editing software designed to optimize images with a single click. The software analyzes a photo's object type and applies suitable edition settings. Once default results are produced that way, the tool allows for subsequent manual adjustments to tone, color, and other details. The software is designed to run locally, using the user's device resources, without uploading data to the cloud. Unlike generative AI tools, Radiant Photo 2 works exclusively by modifying existing pixels, without creating new ones. Made by Radiant Imaging Labs, the app can work standalone or as a plug-in for Adobe products. Its performance was recently reviewed in comparison to other photo editors in the category.
