= Picsart =

Armenian Cross-platform design, photo and video editing platform

- Type: Private
- Industry: Software; Internet; Graphic design; Artificial intelligence
- Founded: November 2011; 15 years ago in Yerevan, Armenia
- Founders: Hovhannes Avoyan; Artavazd Mehrabyan; Mikayel Vardanyan
- Headquarters: Miami, Florida, United States and Yerevan, Armenia
- Key people: Hovhannes Avoyan (CEO); Artavazd Mehrabyan (CTO); Mikayel Vardanyan (CPO)
- Products: Web editor; iOS and Android apps; templates library; generative AI tools; photo and video editors
- Total equity: $1.5 billion
- Members: 150 million monthly active users
- Number of employees: 1,374 (2024)
- Website: picsart.com

Picsart is an Armenian cross-platform design and editing platform that offers web and mobile tools for creating images and videos using templates, layer-based editors and generative AI features. Its browser-based editor (Picsart Web) and mobile apps provide template-based and freeform editing for photos and videos. As of 2024, TechCrunch reported that Picsart serves about 150 million monthly active users and partnered with Getty Images on a commercially safe AI image model. The apps have been downloaded over one billion times globally.

== Usage ==
TechCrunch and other outlets have reported that Picsart has around 150 million monthly active users and more than one billion cumulative downloads worldwide. The service is available through a web editor and native apps for iOS and Android, with integrations for exporting content to social platforms and accessing files from services such as Dropbox and Google Drive.

== Products and features ==
Picsart provides a suite of tools for creating and editing images and videos across web and mobile platforms. Its core products include a template library, generative AI features and photo and video editors.

=== Design templates ===
The platform includes a library of more than 50,000 editable templates for social media posts, marketing materials and other graphic formats. Templates can be customised with user-provided images, text, fonts and brand elements, and exported in multiple aspect ratios.

=== Generative AI and automation ===
Picsart offers integrated generative tools such as an AI image generator and AI text tools, introduced in 2022. In 2024, it announced a partnership with Getty Images to build a custom text-to-image model designed for commercial use within Picsart products. The service also includes AI-assisted functions such as background and object removal and image enhancement on both web and mobile clients.

=== Photo and video editing ===
The photo editor supports layer-based editing with effects, filters, drawing tools and collage layouts. Video tools in the apps provide basic trimming, overlays, text and effects intended for social media clips.

=== Enterprise and developer offerings ===
In addition to its consumer apps, Picsart offers APIs and software development kits under the "Picsart for Developers" and enterprise programmes. These include a Remove Background API and related image-editing endpoints, as well as an embeddable editor SDK for e-commerce, marketing and web-to-print platforms. The company also markets an AI-assisted ad creation tool, Adpilot, aimed at small businesses and marketers for generating social media ad creatives.

== Platform and community ==
Picsart combines creation tools with social features, including user profiles and interest-based communities. In 2023, the company launched "Spaces," topic-based groups that organize collaborative creation and content discovery within the app.

== Developer platform ==
In 2022 Picsart launched "Picsart for Developers", an API and SDK programme that allows third parties to embed editing and generative features into their own products on a usage-based pricing model.

== Funding ==
As of August 2021, the company had received $195 million in cumulative venture funding from Sequoia Capital, Insight Partners, and others, giving it a reported post-money valuation of roughly $1.5 billion.

== History ==
=== 2011–2014 ===
Picsart was founded in November 2011 by Armenian entrepreneur Hovhannes Avoyan with engineers Artavazd Mehrabyan and Mikayel Vardanyan; the first app launched on Android later that year. The company released an iOS version for iPhone in January 2013 and expanded to iPad in mid-2013. In 2014 Picsart added support for Windows platforms, including Windows Phone and Windows 8.1 PCs and tablets.

=== 2015–2017 ===
Picsart raised financing to expand the platform, including a US$10 million round led by Sequoia Capital (February 2015) and a US$15 million round led by Insight Venture Partners (June 2015). In April 2016, the company secured an additional US$20 million to grow its user base in Asia.

Picsart introduced community and collaboration tools during this period, including “Remix Chat” for collaborative editing (2017) and custom sticker creation features. User growth milestones reported in the press included 100 million monthly active users by October 2017.

=== 2018–2020 ===
By March 2019 Picsart reported reaching 130 million monthly active users, with strong adoption in Asia. In late 2019 and January 2020, Picsart and the American University of Armenia (AUA) announced a joint artificial intelligence lab in Yerevan to conduct research in machine learning and computer vision.

=== 2021–2022 ===
On August 26, 2021, Picsart raised US$130 million in a Series C led by SoftBank Vision Fund 2, valuing the company at over US$1 billion. In February 2022 the company moved its corporate headquarters to Miami Beach as part of a global expansion.

Picsart launched an API/SDK programme ("Picsart for Developers") in February 2022 to let partners embed editing capabilities, and introduced AI-powered enhancement features in mid-2022. Later that year, the company added a text-to-image generator and AI writing tools to its consumer apps.

=== 2023–2025 ===
In December 2022 Picsart launched “AI Avatars”, followed by a standalone app, SketchAI, in January 2023 for turning sketches into digital art with generative models. In May 2023 the company introduced Spaces, topic-based in-app communities for collaboration and discovery. In 2024, Picsart and Getty Images announced a partnership to build a custom generative AI model trained on licensed content for commercial use within Picsart tools.

=== 2026-present ===
In January 2026, Picsart introduced Flow, an AI-powered workflow canvas for organizing, tracking and collaborating on creative content, later adding a Motion Graphics node that generates rendered motion-graphics videos from a text prompt.

In March 2026, the company added an AI Copilot to Flow, released in beta on web and mobile. Also in March 2026, Picsart launched AI Playground, a unified interface providing access to more than 90 AI models from 24 providers through a single prompt, spanning image, video and audio generation with pay-per-generation pricing.

On 16 March 2026, the company opened an AI Agent Marketplace, allowing creators to "hire" specialized AI assistants—initially Flair, Resize Pro, Remix and Swap—to automate tasks such as resizing and remixing social content and editing product photos, with a Shopify integration and configurable agent autonomy levels.

In April 2026, Picsart released a GenAI CLI, a command-line and conversational interface for programmatic creative production across image, video and audio.

In August 2026, Picsart AI Playground became available as a native desktop application for macOS and Windows. The desktop version included access to more than 175+ video, image and audio models, on-device prompt-related tools and voice transcription, local video-editing functions, direct access to local files, and offline operation for some features. Product Hunt listed Picsart AI Playground for Desktop as launched on August 4, 2026.

In October 2026, Picsart introduced Marketing Studio, which combines advertising planning, creative production and testing with Google Ads campaign management. The service uses Zappi’s predictive scoring to test advertising content.

== See also ==
- Canva
- Adobe Inc.
- Fotor
- Pixlr
- CapCut
- Recraft
