= Scott Kelby =

American photographer and writer

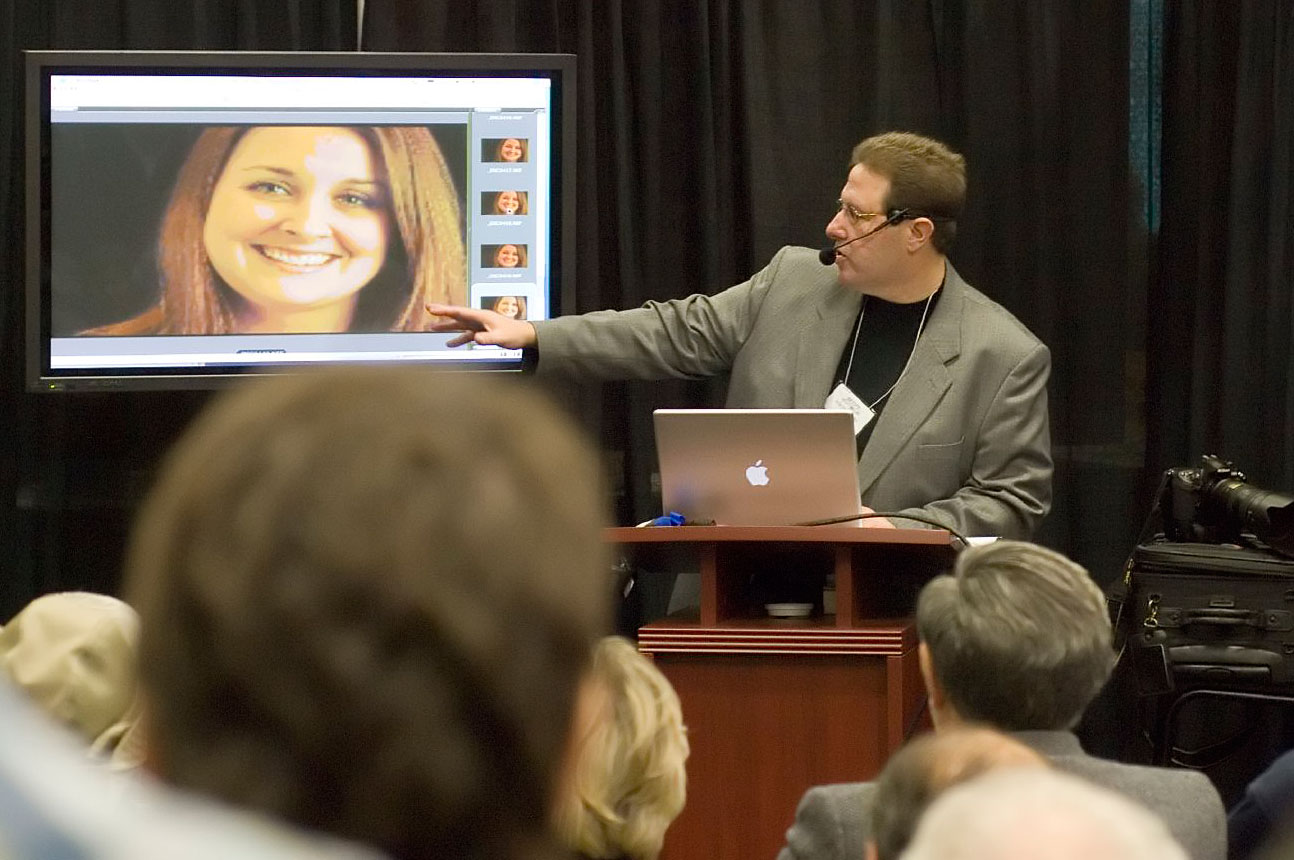
Scott Kelby

Scott Kelby (born July 7, 1960) is an American photographer and an author and publisher of periodicals dealing with photography and Adobe Photoshop software, for design professionals, photographers, and artists.

== Photography career ==
Kelby is editor and publisher of the Photoshop User Magazine, president and co-founder of the National Association of Photoshop Professionals (NAPP) and president of Kelby Media Group, an Oldsmar, Florida-based software training, education, and publishing firm.

He is a photographer, designer, and author of more than 60 books on related topics including The Digital Photography Book series. For the years 2010 through 2012 Kelby was named the top-selling author of books on photography according to research based on Nielsen BookScan data. In 2015 he won the Hamdan International Photography Award.

Kelby is the training director for the Adobe Photoshop Seminar Tour and conference technical chair for the Photoshop World Conference & Expo. He is featured in a series of online Photoshop training classes and DVDs and has been training Photoshop users since 1993. In the fall of 2007, he created Kelbytraining.com to bring his training material online.

Since the fall of 2005, Kelby has co-presented the video podcast Photoshop User TV, named after his organization's magazine. The 30 to 45 minute weekly show began life as "Photoshop TV" (and was briefly "NAPP TV"). During the show, Kelby and his NAPP friends/coworkers talk Adobe Photoshop news and tutorials in a witty, bantering style.

In 2008, he started the "Scott Kelby Worldwide Photowalk".

In March 2011, Kelby launched a weekly talk-show for photographers called "The Grid Live," with co-host RC Concepćion. Show topics include current photography and creative industry topics, and viewers are encouraged to participate by posting questions to a live feed.

== Publications ==
- 2000 Photoshop 6 Down and Dirty Tricks
- 2001 Photoshop 6 Killer Tips
- 2001 Photoshop 6 Photo-Retouching Secrets
- 2002 Mac OS X v. 10.2 Jaguar Killer Tips
- 2002 Macintosh...The Naked Truth
- 2002 Photoshop 7 Down & Dirty Tricks
- 2002 Photoshop 7 Killer Tips
- 2002 Photoshop Most Wanted: Effects and Design Tips
- 2003 Adobe Photoshop CS Down & Dirty Tricks
- 2003 Mac OS X Panther Killer Tips
- 2003 Photoshop Elements for Photographers
- 2003 The Adobe Photoshop CS Book for Digital Photographers
- 2003 The Mac OS X Conversion Kit: 9 to 10 Side by Side, Panther Edition
- 2003 The Photoshop Book for Digital Photographers
- 2003 The Photoshop Elements Book for Digital Photographers
- 2004 InDesign CS Killer Tips
- 2004 Photoshop Classic Effects: The Essential Effects Every User Needs to Know
- 2004 Photoshop CS Killer Tips
- 2004 Photoshop Elements 3 Down & Dirty Tricks
- 2004 Photoshop in Motion with Final Cut Pro
- 2004 The iTunes for Windows Book
- 2004 The Photoshop Elements 3 Book for Digital Photographers
- 2005 Digital Photography Killer Tips
- 2005 Getting Started with Your Mac and Mac OS X Tiger
- 2005 InDesign CS2 Killer Tips
- 2005 Mac OS X Tiger Killer Tips
- 2005 Photoshop CS2 Down & Dirty Tricks
- 2005 Photoshop CS2 Killer Tips
- 2005 Photoshop CS2 Power Session
- 2005 Photoshop for Wedding Photographers Personal Seminar Interactive DVD Training and Guide
- 2005 The Book for Guys Who Don't Want Kids
- 2005 The iPod Book: Doing Cool Stuff with the iPod and the iTunes Music Store
- 2005 The Photoshop CS2 Book for Digital Photographers
- 2005 The Photoshop CS2 Channels Book
- 2006 The Digital Photography Book, Volume 1 - ISBN 978-0-321-47404-9
- 2007 The iPhone Book: How to Do the Things You Want With Your iPhone
- 2007 The Photoshop CS3 Book for Digital Photographers
- 2007 The Adobe Photoshop Lightroom Book for Digital Photographers
- 2007 The Photoshop 7-point System
- 2008 The Digital Photography Book, Volume 2 - ISBN 978-0-321-52476-8
- 2008 The Adobe Photoshop Lightroom 2 Book for Digital Photographers
- 2009 The Adobe Photoshop CS4 Book for Digital Photographers
- 2009 Photoshop CS4 Down & Dirty Tricks
- 2009 The Digital Photography Book, Volume 3 - ISBN 0-321-61765-7
- 2009 Photo Recipes Live: Behind the Scenes: Your Guide to Today's Most Popular Lighting Techniques - ISBN 0-321-70175-5
- 2010 The Adobe Photoshop CS5 Book for Digital Photographers
- 2010 The Adobe Photoshop Lightroom 3 Book for Digital Photographers
- 2011 Light it, Shoot it, Retouch it - ISBN 0321786610
- 2011 Professional Portrait Retouching Techniques for Photographers Using Photoshop - ISBN 978-0321725547
- 2011 The Photoshop Elements 10 Book for Digital Photographers - ISBN 978-0321808240
- 2011 It's a Jesus Thing - ISBN 978-1937038175
- 2012 The iPhone Book: Covers iPhone 5, iPhone 4S, and iPhone 4 (6th Edition) - ISBN 978-0321908568
- 2012 The Digital Photography Book, Part 4 - ISBN 978-0321773029
- 2012 The Adobe Photoshop CS6 Book for Digital Photographers - ISBN 978-0321823748
- 2012 The Photoshop Elements 11 Book for Digital Photographers - ISBN 978-0321884831
- 2012 The Adobe Photoshop Lightroom 4 Book for Digital Photographers - ISBN 978-0321819581
- 2013 The Digital Photography Book: Part 1 (2nd Edition) - ISBN 978-0321934949
- 2013 The Adobe Photoshop Book for Digital Photographers (Covers Photoshop CS6 and Photoshop CC) - ISBN 978-0321933843
- 2013 Professional Sports Photography Workflow - ISBN 978-1937038540
- 2015 How Do I Do That In Lightroom?: The Quickest Ways to Do the Things You Want to Do, Right Now! - ISBN 978-1937538934
