= List of vocational colleges in the United States =

Vocational schools in the United States are traditionally vocational colleges which prepare students to enter the workforce after they receive an vocational degree. Students may also use courses as credit transferable to four-year universities. Programs often combine classroom lessons in theory with hands-on applications of the lessons students learned.

== Alabama ==
- Brown Mackie College
- Culinard
- Remington College

== Arizona ==
- The Art Institute of Phoenix
- Brown Mackie College
- Maricopa Skill Center

== Arkansas ==
- Pulaski Technical College
- Remington College

== California ==
- The Art Institute of California – Orange County
- Platt College (San Diego)
- UEI College
- ICOHS College

== Colorado ==
- The Art Institute of Colorado
- Colorado Technical University
- Everest College

== Connecticut ==
- Lincoln College of New England
- Porter and Chester Institute

== Florida ==
- The Art Institute of Tampa
- Culinard
- Brown Mackie College
- Amslee Institute

== Georgia ==
- Art Institute of Atlanta
- Brown Mackie College
- Miller-Motte Technical College
- UEI College

== Idaho ==
- Brown Mackie College
- College of Western Idaho
- Eastern Idaho Technical College

== Illinois ==
- The Art Institute of Chicago
- Coyne College
- Midwest Technical Institute
- Rasmussen College
- Vatterott College

== Indiana ==
- Brown Mackie College
- ITT Technical Institute
- Midwest Technical Institute

== Iowa ==
- Brown Mackie College
- Vatterott College

== Kansas ==
- Brown Mackie College
- Pinnacle Career Institute
- Rasmussen College
- Vatterott College
- WSU Tech

== Kentucky ==
- Brown Mackie College
- Kentucky Community and Technical College System
- Spencerian College

== Louisiana ==
- Culinard
- Louisiana Technical College
- Northwest Louisiana Technical College
- Remington College
- Sabine Normal and Industrial Institute (1903–1928)

== Maine ==
- Argosy University
- Empire Beauty Schools

== Maryland ==
- Empire Beauty Schools
- ITT Technical Institute

== Massachusetts ==
- National Aviation Academy
- Porter and Chester Institute
- Universal Technical Institute

== Michigan ==
- Art Institute of Michigan
- Northwestern Technological Institute

== Minnesota ==
- Penn Foster Career School
- Stratford Career Institute

== Mississippi ==
- Delta Technical College
- ITT Technical Institute

== Missouri ==
- Brown Mackie College
- Midwest Technical Institute
- Pinnacle Career Institute
- Vatterott College

== Montana ==
- ITT Technical Institute
- Montana Tech of the University of Montana
- Stratford Career Institute

== Nebraska ==
- ITT Technical Institute
- Stratford Career Institute

== Nevada ==
- The Art Institute of Las Vegas
- Everest College
- ITT Technical Institute

== New Hampshire ==
- Lakes Region Community College
- NHTI

== New Jersey ==
- Divers Academy International
- E & S Academy
- Empire Beauty Schools
- ITT Technical Institute
- Lincoln Group of Schools

== New Mexico ==
- Brown Mackie College
- ITT Technical Institute

== New York ==
- Empire Beauty Schools
- ITT Technical Institute
- Onondaga School of Therapeutic Massage

== North Carolina ==
- The Art Institute of Charlotte
- Asheville–Buncombe Technical Community College
- Culinard
- Empire Beauty Schools
- Wake Technical Community College

== North Dakota ==
- ITT Technical Institute
- Stratford Career Institute

== Ohio ==
- Brown Mackie College
- Ohio Technical College
- Vatterott College

== Oklahoma ==
- Brown Mackie College
- ITT Technical Institute
- Vatterott College

== Oregon ==
- Pioneer Pacific College
- The Art Institute of Portland

== Pennsylvania ==
- The Art Institute of Philadelphia
- Lincoln Group of Schools
- McCann School of Business & Technology

== Rhode Island ==
- New England Institute of Technology

== South Carolina ==
- The Art Institute of Charleston
- Brown Mackie College
- Culinard

== South Dakota ==
- Mitchell Technical Institute
- Western Dakota Technical Institute

== Tennessee ==
- Tennessee Colleges of Applied Technology
- Vatterott College

== Texas ==
- Brown Mackie College
- Everest College
- UEI College

== Utah ==
- Bridgerland Technical College
- Davis Technical College
- Dixie Technical College
- Mountainland Technical College
- Ogden–Weber Technical College
- Southwest Technical College
- Tooele Technical College
- Uintah Basin Technical College

== Virginia ==
- Culinard
- Everest College
- Liberty University, in connection with Virginia Technical Institute.

== Washington ==
- American Northwest College, an exempt institution by the Washington Workforce Training and Education Coordinating Board
- Bates Technical College
- Bellingham Technical College
- Clover Park Technical College
- Lake Washington Institute of Technology
- Renton Technical College
- Spokane Community College
- The Art Institute of Seattle
- Carrington College (US)
- Everest College

== Wisconsin ==
- Wisconsin Technical College System

== Wyoming ==
- Casper College

== See also ==
- Higher education in the United States
- 50 states community college systems
