= Ecotech Institute =

- Type: Private for-profit college
- Active: 2010–2018
- Owner: Educational Corporation of America
- Location: Aurora, Colorado, Colorado, United States; 39°41′29″N 104°49′37″W
- Website: http://www.ecotechinstitute.com

Ecotech Institute was a private for-profit college in Aurora, Colorado. It offered classes and certificates focused on renewable energy and energy efficiency. The first class graduated in June 2012 with 42 students with subsequent classes growing larger. The school closed in December 2018.

== History ==
Ecotech's first classes began in July, 2010 in a temporary facility. The institute opened its new facilities in January, 2011 with almost 200 students, some starting their third quarter. The first class graduated June 21, 2012, receiving two year associate degrees in wind energy technology, solar energy technology, renewable energy technology and electrical engineering technology.

== Facilities ==
Ecotech Institute's campus has Leadership in Energy and Environmental Design (LEED) gold certification from the U.S. Green Building Council. The facility features solar panels and wind turbines on its roof, as well as solar trees on the grounds, energy-saving zero-client computing technology and occupancy-sensitive lighting.

== Curriculum ==
Ecotech Institute offers coursework in renewable energy and energy efficiency. These led to diploma certifications and were intended to be completed in 9–12 months.

== Location ==
The Colorado location was selected because of the state's renewable energy resources as well as the state government's green-friendly reputation. Ecotech stated that it intended to "expand across the U.S." following the establishment of its Colorado campus.

== Accreditation ==
Ecotech Institute programs were accredited by the Accrediting Council for Independent Colleges and Schools.

== Ownership ==
The company that owned and operated the schools, Education Corporation of America, is a privately held corporation headquartered in Birmingham, Alabama. ECA also owned Virginia College Online, which offered distance education academic programs via the Internet; Golf Academy of America; New England College of Business and Finance; Culinard, the Culinary Institute of Virginia College, offering degrees in the culinary arts.

== See also ==
- Clean technology
