= MTI =

MTI may refer to:

== Government and military ==
- Mastering the Internet, a mass surveillance project led by the British intelligence agency GCHQ
- Military training instructor, the United States Air Force equivalent of a drill instructor

== Technology ==
- Message Type Indicator, in ISO 8583
- Moving target indication, a radar signal processing technique used to distinguish targets from clutter

== Organizations ==
- Magyar Távirati Iroda, a Hungarian news wire agency
- Ministry of Trade and Industry (Singapore), a ministry of the Government of Singapore
- Mitchell Technical Institute, a community college in South Dakota, US
- Music Theatre International, a musical theater licensing company
- Midwest Technical Institute, a vocational school in Springfield, Illinois, US
- MTI Home Video, a film distributor

== Other uses ==
- Master of Translation and Interpreting, a master's degree
- Mother tongue influence, a form of language interference
- Movie tie-in (book) edition of a book is often indicated by "(MTI)" after its title
- Muppet Treasure Island, a 1996 Muppet film
