= Mobile Festival Centre =

- Location: Mobile, Alabama, United States
- Coordinates: 30°40′24″N 88°08′11″W
- Address: Airport Boulevard and Montlimar Drive
- Opened: November 1986
- Manager: Veritas Realty LLC
- Owner: Mobile Festival Acquisition LLC
- Architect: Glenn Golson, Architecture Plus
- Num. of anchor tenants: 6
- Floor area: 380,619 sq ft (35,360.7 m^{2})
- Floors: 1
- Website: www.kimcorealty.com/0949B

The Mobile Festival Centre is a shopping center located in Mobile, Alabama. It was previously owned by the New York-based Kimco Realty Corporation and was sold to Mobile Festival Acquisition LLC in May 2013.

The centre contains five anchor tenants: Academy Sports + Outdoors, Bed Bath & Beyond, Guitar Center, Ross Dress For Less, and Virginia College. It is located on Montlimar Drive and has road frontage to Airport Boulevard.

== History ==
The Mobile Festival Centre was originally developed by Montgomery-based CF Halstead and Associates. It was designed by firm Architecture Plus of Monroe, Louisiana. When it debuted in November 1986, the $40 million, 500,000 sq ft (46,000 m^{2}) shopping complex was considered one of the largest examples of the nascent power center format in the Southeastern United States. Situated on 72 acres (29 ha) at the intersection of Airport Boulevard and Montlimar Drive, the Mobile Festival Centre had many national retailers new to the market anchoring its smaller in-line tenants. The first Wal-Mart Discount City department store inside the Mobile city limits was joined by Circuit City, Phar-Mor, Sugar's, Marshall's, Ross Dress For Less and one of the few locations of Kroger's unconventional supermarket warehouse format: Welcome.

A walkway featuring a blue metal canopy runs between each retailer, shielding visitors from the elements. The roughly horseshoe-shaped power center featured attributes commonly seen in enclosed shopping centers. The power center's food court had more than 400 seats in an interior and open-air setting. Adjacent to the food court, there were a couple of casual dining restaurants, including O'Charley's bar and grill. A landscaped plaza was the focal point of the food court and was designed for civic functions and other festivities. Beyond this was an entertainment anchor in the form of Cinemark's Movies 10 discount multiplex.

As nearby strip malls were developed and other regional shopping centers evolved, the Mobile Festival Centre's power center format faced increased competition. Walmart closed in favor of a nearby supercenter constructed on a portion of the site of Springdale Mall's aborted north wing expansion. Cinemark shuttered its Movies 10 complex of theaters at the Festival Centre. The Welcome supermarket was shuttered in August 1995 after being acquired by the local Delchamps supermarket chain, who then eventually developed a flagship store at nearby McGregor Square.

Many stores either closed or moved during the 1990s, but some, such as EB Games and Guitar Center opened. However, there are still many vacancies in the center.

== Current tenants ==
=== Anchors ===
- Academy Sports + Outdoors (84,464 sq ft (7,847.0 m^{2}))
- Jo-ann Fabrics(24,800 sq ft (2,300 m^{2}))
- Guitar Center (11,164 sq ft (1,037.2 m^{2}))
- VACANT (31,478 sq ft (2,924.4 m^{2}))
- VACANT (31,500 sq ft (2,930 m^{2}))
- VACANT (60,293 sq ft (5,601.4 m^{2}))

=== Others ===
- Feast Buffet
- LL Flooring
- Palm Beach Tan
- Elysian Nail Lounge
- Salons by JC
- Sport Clips
- Subway
- Alfa Insurance
- Safety Plus
- TruBridge
- ACCEL Academy
