= Cambridge University (disambiguation) =

The University of Cambridge is a collegiate research university located in Cambridge, England, founded in 1209.

Cambridge University may also refer to:

- Cambridge University (UK Parliament constituency), university constituency to the British House of Commons from 1603 to 1950

== See also ==
- Cambridge College, a private college based in Boston, Massachusetts
