= Virginia College =

Defunct for-profit college

- Type: Private for-profit college
- Active: 1983–2018
- Owner: Educational Corporation of America
- Students: 11,000
- Location: Birmingham (Main Campus), Alabama, United States

Virginia College was a private for-profit college located primarily in the southeastern United States. It offered classes, certificates, diplomas, and degrees related to specific professions such as health sciences, information technology, business, office management, and criminal justice. It also offered online degree programs.

After Virginia College failed to be accredited by the Accrediting Council for Continuing Education and Training, and an appeal being rejected, approximately one-third of its campuses were expected to close by 2020, the company announced in September 2018. In December 2018 Virginia College announced all campuses would close citing financial challenges and accreditation issues.

== History ==
The original Virginia College campus was founded in 1983 in Roanoke, Virginia. In 1989, it was acquired by Education Futures, Inc. In February 1992, it opened its first branch campus in the Birmingham, Alabama suburb of Homewood. Another branch campus was opened in April 1993 in Huntsville, Alabama.

== Ownership ==
The company that owned and operated the schools, Education Corporation of America, was a privately held corporation headquartered in Birmingham, Alabama. ECA also owned Virginia College Online, which offered distance education academic programs via the Internet; Golf Academy of America; Culinard, the Culinary Institute of Virginia College, offering degrees in the culinary arts; and Ecotech Institute, offering degrees in fields of renewable energy, sustainable design, and energy efficiency.

== Locations ==
Brick and mortar campus locations:

- Augusta, Georgia
- Birmingham, Alabama
- Bossier City, Louisiana
- Charleston, South Carolina
- Florence, South Carolina
- Greenville, South Carolina
- Jacksonville, Florida
- Knoxville, Tennessee
- Lubbock, Texas
- Pensacola, Florida
- Richmond, Virginia
- Savannah, Georgia
- Greensboro, North Carolina

Campuses scheduled to close by 2020:

- Austin, Texas
- Baton Rouge, Louisiana
- Biloxi, Mississippi
- Jackson, Mississippi
- Chattanooga, Tennessee
- Columbia, South Carolina
- Spartanburg, South Carolina
- Columbus, Georgia
- Macon, Georgia
- Fort Pierce, Florida
- Pensacola, Florida
- Tulsa, Oklahoma
- Montgomery, Alabama
- Huntsville, Alabama
- Mobile, Alabama
- Phoenix, Arizona

== Curriculum ==
Virginia College offered courses in health care, cosmetology, business, criminal justice, paralegal, and network engineering (Network engineering courses are not ABET-accredited), as well as several trades (professional training) programs such as truck driving. Online classes and degrees were also offered.

== Accreditation ==
Virginia College was accredited by the Accrediting Council for Independent Colleges and Schools (ACICS). When the U.S. Department of Education withdrew recognition from ACICS as a federally-recognized accreditor in September 2016, Virginia College sought accreditation from the Accrediting Council for Continuing Education and Training (ACCET). In March 2018, Virginia College's proposal for accreditation to ACCET was rejected, as was its subsequent appeal.

== Criticism ==
In 2012, Virginia College was sued by the Mississippi Center for Justice on behalf of seven students. The lawsuit claims that Virginia College misled students about the value of their degrees, and that it specifically targeted misleading advertising to women and minority students. The case was remanded to arbitration.

In 2022, Virginia College was one of 153 institutions included in student loan cancellation due to alleged fraud. The class action was brought by a group of more than 200,000 student borrowers, assisted by the Project on Predatory Student Lending, part of the Legal Services Center of Harvard Law School. A settlement was approved in August 2022, finding that there was "substantial misconduct by the listed schools, whether credibly alleged or in some instances proven." In April 2023, the Supreme Court rejected a challenge to the settlement and allowed the debt cancellation to proceed due to alleged fraud.

== See also ==
- Vocational school
- Online degrees
