= Career Point College =

US private career school

Coordinates: 29.484343°N 98.543388°W

Career Point College was a private 2-year for-profit career school located in San Antonio, Texas, with branch campuses in Tulsa, Oklahoma, and Austin, Texas. Its San Antonio location is at the Wonderland of the Americas mall, where it housed a cosmetology school and a nursing school with vocational and RN programs. The Career Point College LVN program was ranked 49th out of 95 Texas programs by PracticalNursing.com.

== History ==
The founding institution, Dickinson Business School, was established in 1921 by Harold R. Frazell to train typists in Kansas City, Missouri. In 1953, a secretarial program was added, a new shorthand system was developed, and by the late 1950s this system was widely accepted in the Kansas City area and became known as “Dickinson Shorthand.”

In the early 1970s, a Missouri corporation consisting of two local educators purchased Dickinson Business School and modified the schools educational programs to emphasize individualized, self-paced instruction, and in late December 1981, Lawrence D. Earle purchased an interest in the institution, broadening the financial base of the school.

By August 1982, Dickinson Business School became accredited by the Accrediting Commission of Independent Colleges and Schools (ACICS), and the San Antonio campus was approved by the Texas Education Agency on December 13, 1983. The first classes began on January 3, 1984, and in 1988, the San Antonio campus was granted “main campus status” by ACICS. Approximately six years later, on December 20, 1989, Earle acquired all outstanding stock of the school from his partner, changed the institution's name to Career Point Business School, and focused solely on the main campus in San Antonio, and a branch campus in Tulsa, Oklahoma. Over the next six years, Career Point Business School increased the sizes of both campuses, as it offered programs in the Medical, Business, Legal and Technology fields.

The school later transitioned to competency-based training and assessment, and continued to modify its program offerings, which eventually led the board of directors to change the school's name to Career Point Institute on March 27, 2001. Soon thereafter, with the introduction of various Associate degree programs, the name changed one final time to Career Point College at the end of 2007.

The college implemented a full-time vocational nursing program in 2009. In 2011, Career Point College expanded its campus on Balcones Heights mall. In 2015, the college campus at the Wonderland of the Americas expanded to make room for its new registered nursing program.

On October 16, 2016, President and CEO Larry Earle, announced the immediate closure of Career Point College. Students were notified via email. Many news outlets reported that the school's financial aid department was involved in multiple cases of monetary fraud.

== Former programs ==
After 2011, Career Point College has made significant additions to the program offerings at both campuses. The Texas Board of Nursing approved Career Point College to offer vocational and registered nursing programs at the School of Nursing and Medical Technology on the San Antonio campus, and both the Texas and Oklahoma State Boards of Cosmetology have approved cosmetology programs to be taught at the Schools of Cosmetology on both campuses.

The college offers education in a total of 28 distinct concentrations, including Associate of Applied Science degrees in Criminal Justice, Cyber Security, and Network Support Specialist, and training in Early Childhood Education, Paralegal, Medical Billing and Coding, Pharmacy Technician, and User Support Specialist.
