= Education Corporation of America =

Companies based in Birmingham, Alabama

- Type: Private company
- Industry: For-profit education
- Founded: 1999
- Defunct: December 7, 2018
- Headquarters: Birmingham, Alabama, US
- Key people: Stu Reed, President and Chief Executive Officer; Christopher Boehm, Chief Financial Officer
- Owner: Willis Stein & Partners
- Website: http://www.ecacolleges.com/

Education Corporation of America, headquartered in Birmingham, Alabama, was a privately held company that operated proprietary colleges across the United States. Included were three schools with 31 campuses, plus one online school and four affiliated businesses. The schools abruptly announced their closing before next semester, after ECA was denied accreditation on December 4, 2018. Closings began on December 7.

== Schools ==
ECA's colleges offered associate degrees, diploma/certificate courses, master's degrees and baccalaureate degrees at various campuses and online.

=== Ecotech Institute ===
Ecotech Institute Institute was a two-year career college in Aurora, Colorado that specialized in training students in the technical and business aspects of the clean energy industry. Associate degree programs offered include business administration with emphasis on sustainability, electrical engineering technology, energy efficiency, facility management technology, power utility technician, renewable energy technology, solar energy technology and wind energy technology.

=== Golf Academy of America ===
Golf Academy of America was a two-year golf college, established in 1974, offering a curriculum of golf instruction and golf business management. An associate degree in golf complex operations and management was offered plus a bachelor's degree via a partnership with Virginia College.

=== Virginia College ===
Virginia College was a system of private for-profit post-secondary institutions located primarily in the Southeastern United States. It offered classes related to specific professions; certificates, diplomas, and degrees in the areas of health and medical, information technology, business, office management, cosmetology, and criminal justice are offered. Virginia College also offered online degree programs.

Culinard was the culinary institute of Virginia College. The program operated on Virginia College campuses in Baton Rouge, Louisiana; Birmingham, Alabama; Chattanooga, Tennessee; Greensboro, North Carolina; Greenville, South Carolina; Jacksonville, Florida; Mobile, Alabama; Richmond, Virginia; and Savannah, Georgia. Culinard offered a diploma/certificate in Culinary Arts and, on some campuses, Pastry Arts. An online Culinary Arts associate degree was also available if certain criteria are met (e.g., having already had formal training in culinary skills at a post-secondary level).

== Accreditation ==
Virginia College, Golf Academy of America, and Ecotech Institute campuses were accredited by the Accrediting Council for Independent Colleges and Schools, a national accrediting body, to award certificates, diplomas, and associate degrees. Some campus locations were also accredited to offer bachelor's and master's degrees. New England College of Business and Finance is regionally accredited by the New England Association of Schools and Colleges.

=== Mississippi controversies ===
In February 2011, 14 former students of ECA's Virginia College in Jackson, Mississippi sued the school on the grounds that it had not yet received its practical nursing program accreditation from the Mississippi Community College Board (formerly State Board for Community and Junior Colleges in Mississippi). The school had been granted initial accreditation but had not yet been granted full accreditation status. The students alleged that they learned the day after graduation that, because the school not been given SBCJC program accreditation, they could not take the nursing exam required to become licensed. Lawyers for the students alleged that the school engaged in fraud by not adequately informing them that the school had not yet received the full program accreditation. School lawyers denied any intent to mislead. Potentially of significance to the case is a document that students in the program were asked to sign. The document includes a notice that Virginia College's program accreditation process was not complete and that this could jeopardize students' ability to take the licensure exam. School lawyers also said that all students upon enrollment are required to sign a waiver that defers lawsuits to third-party arbitration. A county judge upheld that provision in an October 2011 ruling, meaning that a jury would not hear the case. On April 20, 2012, members of the Mississippi Community College Board voted unanimously to move Virginia College's practical nursing program from initial accreditation to full accreditation status.

Another lawsuit was filed in October 2011, this time by students of the surgical technology program. The students alleged similar deception about the school's program accreditation status, as well as fraudulent fees for dormitory and cafeteria expenses. The school had no dormitories or cafeteria. The school denied the allegations and noted that at the time of the allegations, some graduates of the program were employed as surgical technicians, noting that graduating from a school with the program accreditation in question is not required by the state of Mississippi to gain employment in that field.

== National attention ==
In 2010, a series of federal investigations revealed abuse in the for-profit education industry. ECA schools were not investigated or implicated in the investigations. The investigations "found that recruiters would lure students—often members of minorities, veterans, the homeless and low-income people—with promises of quick degrees and post-graduation jobs but often leave them poorly prepared and burdened with staggering federal loans." In response to those investigations, in 2011, the Obama administration proposed a series of rules to crack down on rampant abuse in the industry. In response the proposals, ECA's owners were instrumental in a lobbying effort, along with other colleges, that found errors in conclusions from a Government Accountability Office investigation, leading the GAO to revise some of its statements about industry practices. During the lobbying blitz, Senator Tom Harkin, Democrat of Iowa, who led congressional hearings into the colleges, claimed he was directly threatened by Avy Stein, a partner in the private equity firm that owns ECA. Stein denied he threat and said Harkin's account was "totally incorrect," adding: "Under no circumstances would I would ever threaten a U.S. senator." In the end, Duncan and his department decided that the initial criteria for determining how effectively schools prepared students for jobs simply went too far. Justin Hamilton, an Education Department spokesman, said the original framework "would have unnecessarily eliminated many, many good schools along with the bad."

On January 6, 2020, creditors were successfully able to push Education Corporation of America into Chapter 11 bankruptcy. In 2022, the ECA schools of Brightwood College, Brightwood Career Institute, and Virginia College were part of 153 institutions included in student loan cancellation due to alleged fraud. The class action was brought by a group of more than 200,000 student borrowers, assisted by the Project on Predatory Student Lending, part of the Legal Services Center of Harvard Law School. A settlement was approved in August of 2022, stating that the schools on the list were included "substantial misconduct by the listed schools, whether credibly alleged or in some instances proven." In April of 2023, the Supreme Court rejected a challenge to the settlement and allowed to proceed the debt cancellation due to alleged fraud.
