= John Bremer =

Canadian educator (1927–2015)

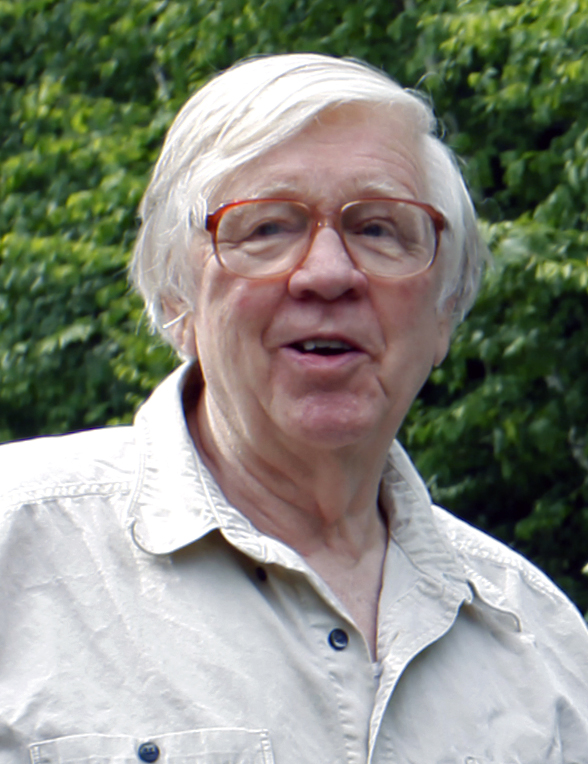
- Born: 1927; England
- Died: 2015 (aged 87–88)
- Education: Pembroke College, Cambridge; University of Leicester; St. John's College, U.S.
- Occupations: Educator and philosopher

John Bremer (1927–2015) was an educator and Socratic philosopher. In 2008, he retired as a senior scholar teaching at Cambridge College in Cambridge, Massachusetts, where he was Professor of Humanities and Director of the college's Humanities and Freedom Institute. Bremer founded Cambridge College in 1971 when it was then known as the "Institute of Open Education" at Newton College of the Sacred Heart. After retirement he lived full-time in Vermont, where he continued his research and writing. He died on November 30, 2015.

John Bremer was born in England, living in London during The Blitz, and served in the Royal Air Force during World War II building airfields in England. He held advanced degrees from the Pembroke College, Cambridge, England, the University of Leicester and St. John's College, U.S. Professor Bremer came to the US in 1951 on a Fulbright Fellowship.

In the 1960s, Bremer gained international recognition for creating the Parkway Program, in Philadelphia, the first School Without Walls as documented in a book by the same name. The school was featured in Time Magazine in its edition of March 23, 1970.

He was Killam Senior Fellow at Dalhousie University in Halifax and later Commissioner of Education for British Columbia, Canada in 1973.

In 1975, when a professor of Education at Western Washington University, he founded the Institute of Socratic Study where Professor Bremer was its director until he moved to Australia in 1980 to found the Education Supplement for The Australian newspaper.

== Bibliography ==
- The School Without Walls: Philadelphia's Parkway Program, by John Bremer and Michael von Moschzisker, Holt, New York 1971 ISBN 0-03-085317-6 (trade) Also in translations as: Das Parkway-Program in Philadelphia: Schule ohne Mauern; as A Revolucao Pedagogica: Escola Sem Muros: a Program Parkway de Filadelfia; as La Escuela sin Paredos; and in a Japanese version
- Open Education - A Beginning, by John Bremer and Anne Bremer, New York: Holt, 1972 ISBN 0-03-091921-5 (Trade) (translated as Educacion Abierta: Un Principio; as L'Ecole en Liberte: Guide du Maitre.)
- On Educational Change, National Association of Elementary School Principals, Arlington, 1973 LCCN 73--86255
- A Matrix for Modern Education, Toronto: McClelland and Stewart, 1975 ISBN 0-7710-1643-3
- On Plato's Polity, Institute of Philosophy, Houston USA and Kalamunda WA, Australia, 1984 ISBN 0-930583-00-0
- Plato and the Founding of the Academy, University Press of America, 2002 ISBN 978-0-7618-2435-0
- Plato's Ion: Philosophy as Performance, Bibal Press, Texas USA, January 2005, ISBN 978-1-930566-51-4
- Thomas Taylor the Platonist and James Mill, Utilitarian
- C.S. Lewis, Poetry, and the Great War 1914-1918 (fin press)
- Homer's ILIAD (forthcoming)
- Plato and the Founding of the Academy: Based on a Letter from Plato, newly discovered, University Press of America (November 8, 2002), ISBN 978-0-7618-2435-0
