= Brightwood College =

Defunct system of for-profit colleges in the United States

- Type: For-Profit
- Affiliations: Education Corporation of America
- Students: 20,000
- Location: United States
- Campus Locations: 10 in California; 2 in Indiana; 1 in Maryland; 1 in Nevada; 1 in North Carolina; 1 in Ohio; 1 in Tennessee; 11 in Texas
- Website: www.brightwood.edu

Brightwood College, formerly Kaplan College, was a system of for-profit colleges in the United States, owned and operated by Education Corporation of America. Main qualifications offered included health, business, criminal justice, information technology, nursing and professional training (trades) programs. On December 5, 2018, Brightwood's parent company, Education Corporation of America, announced unexpectedly via an email that all of its schools would be closing in two business days. Staff were terminated without legally required notice.

== History ==
Before being acquired by Education Corporation of America (ECA) in September 2015, Kaplan College was part of Kaplan Higher Education, a subsidiary of Kaplan, Inc.

Kaplan, Inc., purchased the American Institute of Commerce, a business training school founded in 1937, and renamed it Kaplan College in 2000, later renaming it to Kaplan University in 2004.

In 2000, Kaplan acquired Quest Education Corporation, which served 30 schools in 11 states. Quest Education Corporation was renamed Kaplan Higher Education in 2002.

In April 2004, Kaplan Higher Education owned 64 campuses, including Hesser College in New Hampshire, and CEI College in California.

California locations operated under the Maric College brand from 2004-2008, then as Kaplan College. In June 2008, Las Vegas-based Heritage College was folded into the Kaplan College brand. In 2010, the Texas schools acquired as part of the Quest purchase were renamed Kaplan College.

In October 2015, Kaplan College's Dayton, Ohio, campus was renamed Brightwood College. The remaining Kaplan College locations became Brightwood College in February–March 2016.

On December 5, 2018, it was announced that Education Corporation of America was shutting down all Brightwood College locations nationwide, due to loss of accreditation from the US Department of Education.

== Former Campuses ==
- Bakersfield, California
- Chula Vista, California
- Fresno, California
- Modesto, California
- Los Angeles (Van Nuys), California (founded in 1982 as Modern Technology College)
- Palm Springs, California (founded in 2004 as Maric College)
- Riverside, California (founded in 1990 as Computer Education Institute)
- Sacramento, California
- San Diego, California (founded in 1976 as Maric College)
- Vista, California
- Hammond, Indiana
- Indianapolis, Indiana
- Baltimore, Maryland
- Beltsville, Maryland
- Towson, Maryland
- Las Vegas, Nevada (founded in 1990 as Professional Careers, Inc., later Heritage College)
- Charlotte, North Carolina
- Dayton, Ohio
- Nashville, Tennessee
- Arlington, Texas
- Beaumont, Texas
- Brownsville, Texas
- Corpus Christi, Texas
- Dallas, Texas
- El Paso, Texas
- Fort Worth, Texas
- Friendswood, Texas
- Houston, Texas
- Laredo, Texas
- McAllen, Texas
- San Antonio, Texas (two locations)

== Accreditation ==
Brightwood College was accredited by the Accrediting Council for Independent Colleges and Schools (ACICS). On December 12, 2016, ACICS was derecognized by the U.S. Department of Education. April 2018, this action was under review, following a court ruling remanding the December 2016 decision to current Secretary of Education, Betsy DeVos. Accreditation was finally lost December 2018.

== Criticisms ==
=== Alleged improper recruiting ===
Kaplan College, while a part of Kaplan Inc, was one of 15 for-profit colleges cited by the Government Accountability Office (GAO) for deceptive or questionable statements that were made to undercover investigators posing as applicants. The Pembroke Pines, Florida and Riverside, California campuses were both cited in the GAO report. Andrew S. Rosen, President of Kaplan, Inc., described the tactics as "sickening" and promised to eliminate such conduct from Kaplan. On November 30, 2010, the GAO issued a revised report with several significant edits, altering key passages and softening several of the initial allegations. However it stood by its finding that the college had encouraged fraud and misled potential applicants. Five years later, Kaplan College was sold to Education Corp. and renamed Brightwood.

=== Alleged Fraud Regarding Student Loans ===
Brightwood College was one of 153 institutions included in student loan cancellation due to alleged fraud. The class action was brought by a group of more than 200,000 student borrowers, assisted by the Project on Predatory Student Lending, part of the Legal Services Center of Harvard Law School. A settlement was approved in August of 2022, stating that the schools on the list were included "substantial misconduct by the listed schools, whether credibly alleged or in some instances proven." In April of 2023, the Supreme Court rejected a challenge to the settlement and allowed to proceed the debt cancellation due to alleged fraud.
