= Horn Lake, Mississippi =

- City
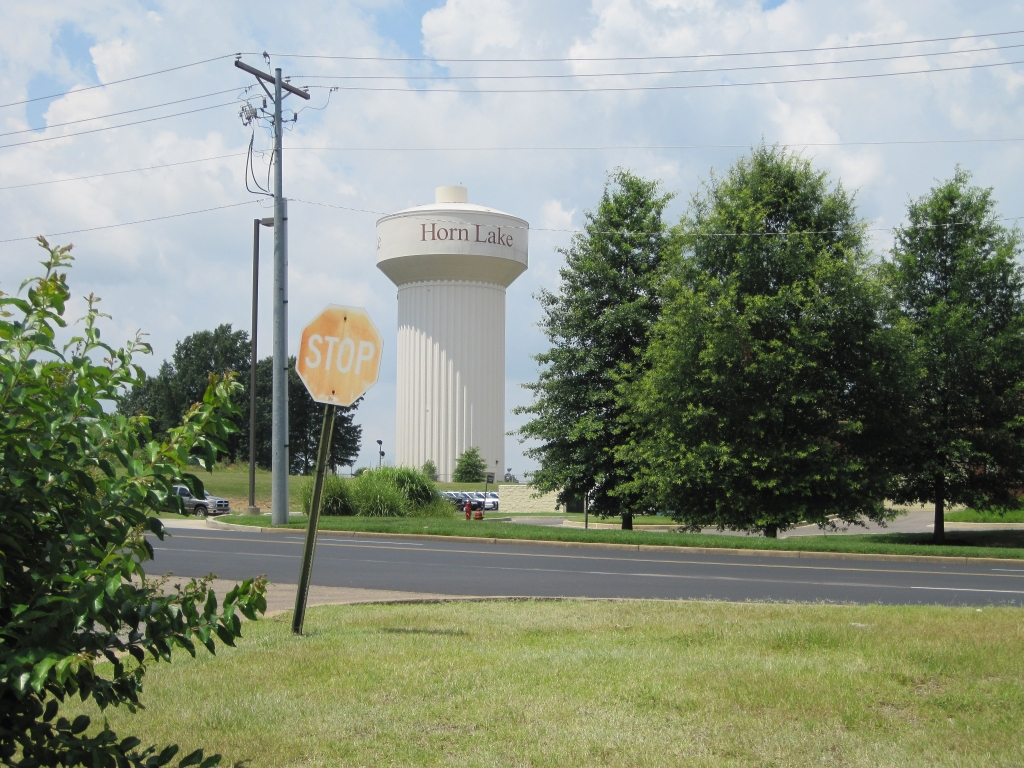
- Water tower in Horn Lake

- Flag Seal
- Motto: "Doorway To Mississippi"
- Interactive map of Horn Lake, Mississippi
- Location within Mississippi Location within the United States
- Coordinates: 34.9521°N 90.0492°W
- Country: United States
- State: Mississippi
- County: DeSoto
- Incorporated: March 3, 1973

Government
  - Type: Mayor–council
  - Mayor: Jimmy Stokes (D)

Area
  - Total: 16.321 sq mi (42.271 km^{2})
  - Land: 16.026 sq mi (41.508 km^{2})
  - Water: 0.295 sq mi (0.763 km^{2}) 1.81%
- Elevation: 305 ft (93 m)

Population (2020)
  - Total: 26,736
  - Estimate (2024): 26,574
  - Density: 1,668.3/sq mi (644.12/km^{2})
- Time zone: UTC−6 (Central (CST))
  - Summer (DST): UTC−5 (CDT)
- ZIP Code: 38637
- Area codes: 662 and 471
- FIPS code: 28-33700
- GNIS feature ID: 2404729
- Website: hornlake.org

Horn Lake is a city in DeSoto County, Mississippi, United States. It is located 1.2 mi (1.9 km) south of Memphis, Tennessee. The population was 26,736 at the 2020 census, and was estimated at 26,574 in 2024. making it the 13th most populous city in Mississippi.

== History ==
Horn Lake traces its name to an ox-bow lake, lying three miles west, which was a former riverbed of the Mississippi River. The river changed course over time in the late 18th century, leaving a stranded area that resembles a cow horn. That's how the city got its name, in old maps indicated the origin taking place between 1765 and 1796.

In historical times when the Chickasaw Indians inhabited that area as their land, Hernando de Soto and his party, the first Europeans to encounter the Chickasaws, wintered with them at the time of his discovery of the Mississippi River. The French Explorer, René-Robert Cavelier, Sieur de La Salle, solicited their help on his journey down after Mississippi to the Gulf of Mexico. The area passed through successive Spanish and English rule, finally coming under American governance after the Revolutionary War. In 1832, the Chickasaws had given up all of their claims to land east of the Mississippi River by the terms of the Treaty of Pontotoc Creek.

Settlers then moved into the area where they were clearing the wilderness and began cultivating subsistence crops. Cotton became a major cash crop, which was used in plantations in the South. The first attempt at incorporation in 1850 failed. The establishment of a post office in 1853 further solidified the community's identity and connectivity. The arrival of the Mississippi and Tennessee Railroad (later the Illinois Central) in 1856, with a depot in Horn Lake, significantly impacted the town's development, facilitating trade and travel. Another early growth milestone included the construction of the community's first school, Horn Lake Academy, in 1867. Freight marked “Horn Lake”, intended for the families who lived in the lake region, was dropped off on Goodman Road and delivered by horse and wagon. Eventually, the freight stop acquired the name “Horn Lake”, and a community grew up as residents built stores, cotton gins, a stockyard, blacksmith shops, and gristmills near the tracks. In 1871, the community's second attempt at incorporation was initially successful; however, when the 1890 census revealed a population of 99, the new city's charter was revoked.

Throughout half of the twentieth century, the community persevered as a rural community, surviving World War I, World War II and the Great Depression. By 1960, the community would begin its "rural to urban" transformation with the arrival, soon thereafter, of new industry such as Dover Elevator, Flavorite Laboratories, and J.T. Shannon Lumber Company, and the opening of Interstate 55 in 1964.

By 1970, the population had increased to 169. In that same year, First Mississippi Corporation initiated the development of some 960 acres as part of a planned neighborhood called DeSoto Village. Due largely to the rapid development of the village, the community was able to incorporate permanently on its third attempt in 1973.

== Geography ==
According to the United States Census Bureau, the city has a total area of 16.321 square miles (42.27 km^{2}), of which 16.026 square miles (41.51 km^{2}) is land and 0.295 square miles (0.76 km^{2}) (1.81%) is water.

Horn Lake is bordered to the east and southeast by the city of Southaven. U.S Route 51 forms a large portion of Horn Lake's eastern border; it leads north 15 miles (24 km) to downtown Memphis, and south 9 miles (14 km) to Hernando, the DeSoto County seat. Interstate 55 passes just east of Horn Lake, with access from Exits 287, 289, and 901.

== Demographics ==
Historical population
Census	Pop.	Note	%±
1970	2,170		—
1980	4,326		99.4%
1990	9,069		109.6%
2000	14,099		55.5%
2010	26,066		84.9%
2020	26,736		2.6%
2024 (est.)	26,574		−0.6%
U.S. Decennial Census; 2020 Census

According to realtor website Zillow, the average price of a home as of March 31, 2026, in Horn Lake is $202,373.

As of the 2024 American Community Survey, there are 10,072 estimated households in Horn Lake with an average of 2.64 persons per household. The city has a median household income of $53,311. Approximately 19.0% of the city's population lives at or below the poverty line. Horn Lake has an estimated 61.6% employment rate, with 16.5% of the population holding a bachelor's degree or higher and 86.6% holding a high school diploma. There were 10,987 housing units at an average density of 1,658.18 per square mile (640.2/km^{2}).

The top five reported languages (people were allowed to report up to two languages, thus the figures will generally add to more than 100%) were English (90.2%), Spanish (8.7%), Indo-European (0.4%), Asian and Pacific Islander (0.5%), and Other (0.2%).

The median age in the city was 33.5 years.

Horn Lake, Mississippi – racial and ethnic composition Note: the US Census treats Hispanic/Latino as an ethnic category. This table excludes Latinos from the racial categories and assigns them to a separate category. Hispanics/Latinos may be of any race.
Race / ethnicity (NH = non-Hispanic)	Pop. 1990	Pop. 2000	Pop. 2010	Pop 2020	% 1990	% 2000	% 2010	% 2020
White alone (NH)	8,691	11,463	14,664	10,098	95.83%	81.30%	56.26%	37.77%
Black or African American alone (NH)	289	1,728	8,537	13,180	3.19%	12.26%	32.75%	49.30%
Native American or Alaska Native alone (NH)	21	64	66	36	0.23%	0.45%	0.25%	0.13%
Asian alone (NH)	18	114	251	200	0.20%	0.81%	0.96%	0.75%
Native Hawaiian or Pacific Islander alone (NH)	—	6	11	18	—	0.04%	0.04%	0.07%
Other race alone (NH)	1	9	25	114	0.01%	0.06%	0.10%	0.43%
Mixed race or multiracial (NH)	—	112	419	1,015	—	0.79%	1.61%	3.80%
Hispanic or Latino (any race)	49	603	2,093	2,075	0.54%	4.28%	8.03%	7.76%
Total	9,069	14,099	26,066	26,736	100.00%	100.00%	100.00%	100.00%

=== 2020 census ===
As of the 2020 census, there were 26,736 people, 9,645 households, and 6,748 families residing in the city. The population density was 1,668.39 inhabitants per square mile (644.2/km^{2}). There were 10,283 housing units at an average density of 641.68 per square mile (247.8/km^{2}). The racial makeup of the city was 38.67% White, 49.49% African American, 0.31% Native American, 0.75% Asian, 0.07% Pacific Islander, 5.47% from some other races and 5.24% from two or more races. Hispanic or Latino people of any race were 7.76% of the population.

There were 9,645 households in Horn Lake, of which 39.2% had children under the age of 18 living in them. Of all households, 37.2% were married-couple households, 18.8% were households with a male householder and no spouse or partner present, and 35.7% were households with a female householder and no spouse or partner present. About 24.5% of all households were made up of individuals and 7.1% had someone living alone who was 65 years of age or older.

Of the residents, 27.9% of residents were under the age of 18 and 10.4% of residents were 65 years of age or older. For every 100 females there were 89.2 males, and for every 100 females age 18 and over there were 83.8 males age 18 and over. The homeowner vacancy rate was 1.2% and the rental vacancy rate was 9.3%.

=== 2010 census ===
As of the 2010 census, there were 26,066 people, 9,052 households, and 6,642 families residing in the city. The population density was 1,627.40 inhabitants per square mile (628.3/km^{2}). There were 9,705 housing units at an average density of 605.92 per square mile (233.9/km^{2}). The racial makeup of the city was 58.95% White, 32.86% African American, 0.36% Native American, 1.01% Asian, 0.05% Pacific Islander, 4.48% from some other races and 2.29% from two or more races. Hispanic or Latino people of any race were 8.03% of the population.

=== 2000 census ===
As of the 2000 census, there were 14,099 people, 4,934 households, and 3,754 families residing in the city. The population density was 1,947.50 inhabitants per square mile (751.9/km^{2}). There were 5,153 housing units at an average density of 711.79 per square mile (274.8/km^{2}). The racial makeup of the city was 83.01% White, 12.26% African American, 0.52% Native American, 0.89% Asian, 0.04% Pacific Islander, 2.20% from some other races and 1.07% from two or more races. Hispanic or Latino people of any race were 4.28% of the population.

There were 4,934 households, out of which 47.3% had children under the age of 18 living with them, 54.1% were married couples living together, 15.9% had a female householder with no husband present, and 23.9% were non-families. 18.1% of all households were made up of individuals, and 4.6% had someone living alone who was 65 years of age or older. The average household size was 2.86 and the average family size was 3.22.

In the city, the population was spread out, with 32.6% under the age of 18, 10.1% from 18 to 24, 36.5% from 25 to 44, 16.1% from 45 to 64, and 4.8% who were 65 years of age or older. The median age was 29 years. For every 100 females, there were 97.7 males. For every 100 females age 18 and over, there were 93.4 males.

The median income for a household in the city was $40,396, and the median income for a family was $43,495. Males had a median income of $32,595 versus $25,045 for females. The per capita income for the city was $17,183. About 6.1% of families and 6.7% of the population were below the poverty line, including 6.6% of those under age 18 and 17.6% of those age 65 or over.

During 2001, Horn Lake annexed several square miles and about 6,000 people to the west of the city's former borders. But, in 2011, the Mississippi Supreme Court blocked the annexation of the Town of Walls because, as the Court explained, the City of Horn Lake was experiencing economic problems, did not satisfy the requirements for annexation, and therefore did not have a need to expand.

== Economy ==
Horn Lake is the site of a plant owned by Chicago-based Newly Weds Foods, which manufactures food coatings, seasonings, and other ingredients for the food processing and service industries.

The headquarters of the American Contract Bridge League are in Horn Lake, along with a related Hall of Fame, museum, and library.

The "Elvis Ranch", a 154.5-acre (62.5 ha) ranch owned by Elvis Presley during the last decade of his life, is in Horn Lake.

GreenTech Automotive's first manufacturing facility was in Horn Lake. The company declined an Associated Press request to tour the Horn Lake manufacturing facility. GreenTech produced few cars, if any. It declared bankruptcy in February 2018.

== Arts and culture ==
=== Attractions ===
- Skate Odyssey of Horn Lake & After School Care

=== Museums ===
- American Contract Bridge League Museum

== Sports ==
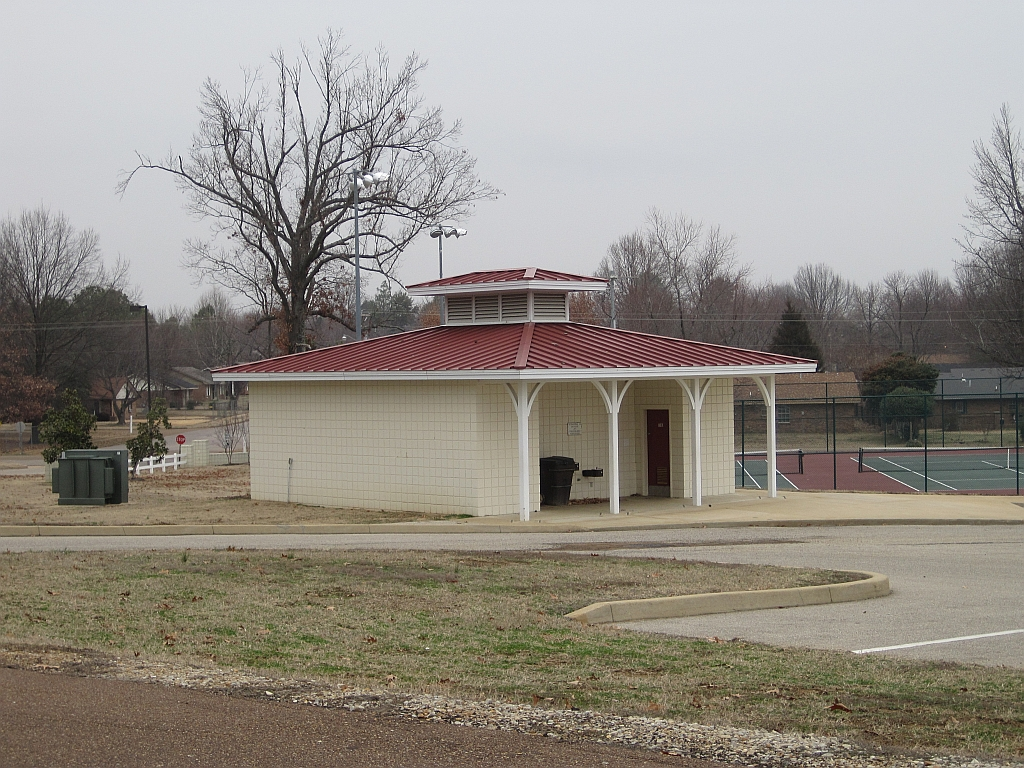
Latimer Lakes Park

=== Gym ===
- CLUB4 Fitness Horn Lake

=== Parks ===
- City of Horn Lake Ball Park
- Horn Lake Parks & Recreation
- Latimer Lakes Park
- Wooten Park

== Government ==
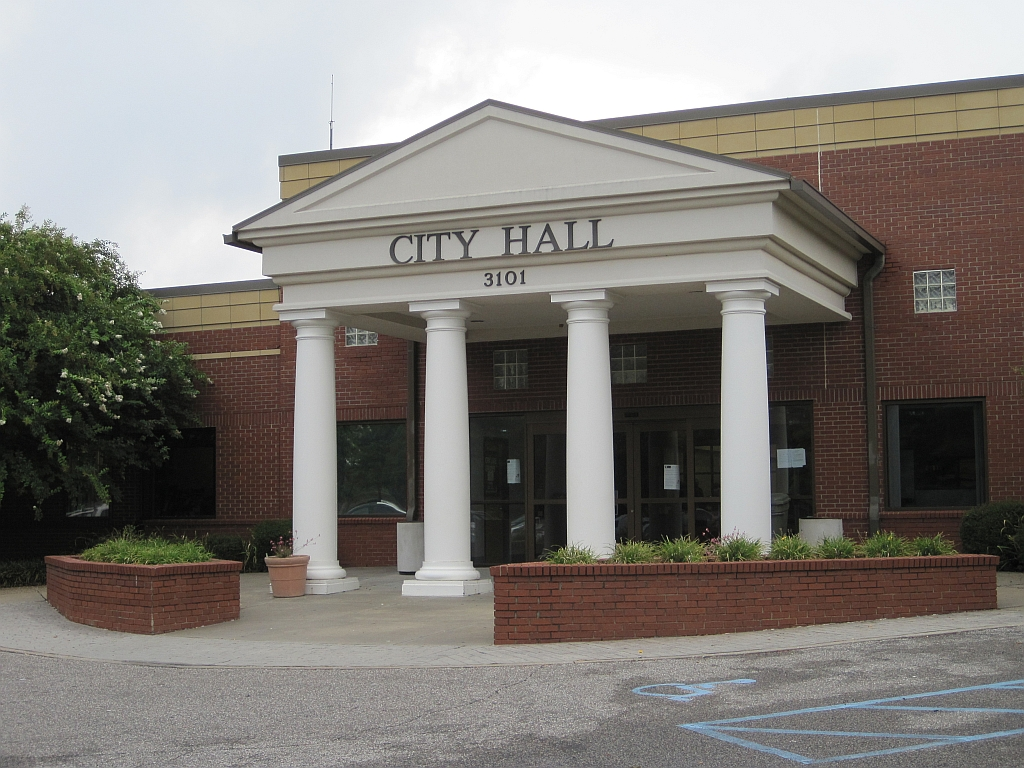
Horn Lake City Hall

Horn Lake is governed via a mayor-council system. The current mayor is Jimmy Stokes of the Democratic Party, who is elected on June 3, 2025. Stokes is the city's first African American mayor. The city council consists of seven members who are each elected from one of six wards, known as single-member districts, with one alderman being elected at large and representing the entire city. The current city council consists of the members Alderman at Large - Larry McKinney, Ward 1 - Joshua Langston, Ward 2 - Tommy Bledsoe, Ward 3 - Jackie C. Bostick, Ward 4 - Kelly Lee Smith, Ward 5 - LaShonda Johnson, and Ward 6 - Charlotte Armstrong.

== Education ==
=== Colleges and universities ===
- Delta Technical College

=== Public secondary schools ===
Horn Lake is served by the DeSoto County School District.

- Horn Lake High School
- DeSoto County Career and Technology Center West
- Horn Lake Intermediate School
- Horn Lake Middle School
- DeSoto County Alternative Center
- Magnolia School (6-12)

=== Public elementary schools ===
- Horn Lake Elementary School
- Shadow Oaks Elementary School

=== Private schools ===
- Gateway Extension Center
- Horn Lake Extension Center

== Media ==
=== FM radio ===
- WHAL 95.7 (Urban gospel)

=== Newspapers ===
- DeSoto Times-Tribune
- DeSoto County News

== Infrastructure ==
=== Transportation ===
==== Rail ====
Rail freight service is offered by one Class III railroads: Grenada Railroad to Southaven and Memphis. It interchanges with six Class I railroads: Canadian National (at Memphis, Tennessee), Norfolk Southern, Union Pacific, BNSF, CSX, Canadian Pacific Kansas City (at Jackson, Mississippi).

==== Mass transit ====
The Delta Rides region, which includes Horn Lake, provides public transit services to employment centers, medical facilities, and other destinations. They also offer a call center for connecting different systems within the region. While there is no fixed-route transit within the county or any city, Memphis Area Transit Authority, Amtrak, Greyhound Lines, Megabus and Delta Bus Lines serve nearby Memphis.

==== Air ====
The nearest airport to Horn Lake, Mississippi is Memphis International Airport. It's located approximately 7 miles northeast of Horn Lake's center.

==== Highways ====
- I-55
- I-69
- US 51
- MS 301
- MS 302

==== Major local routes ====
Major east-west roads include: Goodman Road/Mississippi Highways 301 and 302

Major north-south roads include: I-55/Memphis

== Notable people ==
- Nakobe Dean (b. 2000), professional football player for the Philadelphia Eagles
- TM Garret (b. 1975), author, producer, filmmaker, radio personality, activist
- Big Walter Horton (1921–1981), blues harmonica player
- Brandon Jackson (b. 1985), running back for the Cleveland Browns
- Van H. Manning (1861–1932), second director of the U.S. Bureau of Mines
- Gary North (1942-2022), economist; as of 2007 lived in Horn Lake
- Gary Parrish, sports columnist and television host
- Cody Reed (b. 1993), professional baseball player for the Tampa Bay Rays
- Van Chancellor, former college and professional basketball coach
