= Parkway West High School (Pennsylvania) =

- Mayer Sulzberger Junior High School
- U.S. National Register of Historic Places
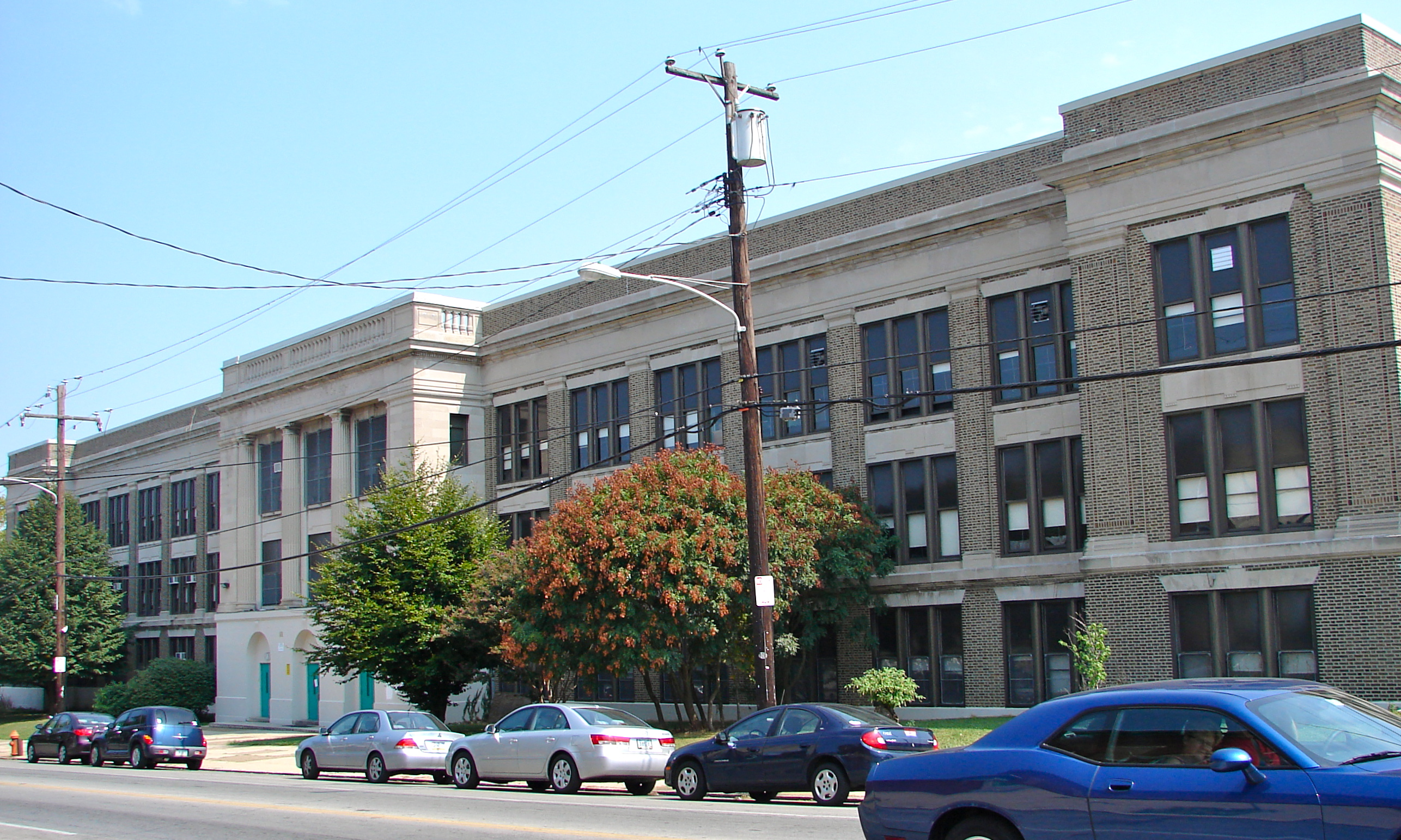
- Mayer Sulzberger Junior High School, September 2010

- Location within Philadelphia Location within Pennsylvania Location within the United States
- Location: 4725 Fairmount Ave., Philadelphia, Pennsylvania
- Coordinates: 39°57′53″N 75°12′57″W
- Area: 2.6 acres (1.1 ha)
- Built: 1923–1924
- Built by: Melody, Michael, Son, & Co.
- Architect: Irwin T. Catharine
- Architectural style: Colonial Revival
- Website: https://parkwaywest.philasd.org/
- MPS: Philadelphia Public Schools TR
- NRHP reference No.: 88002328
- Added to NRHP: November 18, 1988

Parkway West High School is an American public magnet high school that is located in the Mill Creek neighborhood of Philadelphia, Pennsylvania. It shares a site with the Middle Years Alternative School for the Humanities (MYA). Both schools are part of the School District of Philadelphia.

== History and notable features ==
The schools are located in the former Mayer Sulzberger Junior High School building, which was designed by Irwin T. Catharine and built between 1923 and 1924. This historic structure is a three-story, seventeen-bay, brick building that sits on a raised stone basement. Designed in the Colonial Revival style, it was created in the shape of a shallow "W". It features a center projecting pavilion, brick pilasters with stone caps, stone cornice, and a brick parapet. The building was added to the National Register of Historic Places in 1988.

In 2008, the school district voted to close the Sulzberger Middle School due to declining enrollment. Additionally, Parkway West and MYA were moved from an older, deteriorating building to the Sulzberger building. Both schools were moved in by 2009.

Parkway West began in 1970 as the Gamma Campus of the Parkway Program, which was a "school without walls" program. Begun in 1969 by John Bremer, the Parkway Program was a pioneering and influential public alternative school. The school sought to make use of many of the libraries and museums along Benjamin Franklin Parkway, hence the program's name. But the school drew from students located around the whole city. The Parkway Program quickly gained renown and was featured in Time Magazine in its March 23, 1970 edition. Over time there were different "units" of the school in different areas, with Alpha, Beta, and Zeta Units in Center City; the Delta Unit in the areas around Northwest Philadelphia; and the Gamma Unit in West Philadelphia. More specifically, Parkway Gamma was located at 3833 Walnut Street in the University City section of West Philadelphia.

Over time, things changed. The Parkway Program was officially shuttered in 2003, and Parkway Gamma changed its name to Parkway West. It relocated to the former West Philadelphia Catholic High School for Boys, which was located at 49th and Chestnut Streets in West Philadelphia. It had shared the facilities with MYA until relocating to its current location.
