= Vocational education in the United States =

Vocational education in the United States varies from state to state. Vocational schools or tech schools are post-secondary schools (students usually enroll after graduating from high school or obtaining their GEDs) that teach the skills necessary to help students acquire jobs in specific industries. The majority of postsecondary career education is provided by proprietary (privately-owned) career institutions. About 30 percent of all credentials in teaching are provided by two-year community colleges, which also offer courses transferable to four-year universities. Other programs are offered through military teaching or government-operated adult education centers.

Historically, vocational education was considered less financially lucrative in the long term than a bachelor's degree. There are several trade school jobs that earn a respectable income at much less cost in time and money for training. Even ten years after graduation, there are many people with a certificate or associate degree who earn more money than those with a degree.

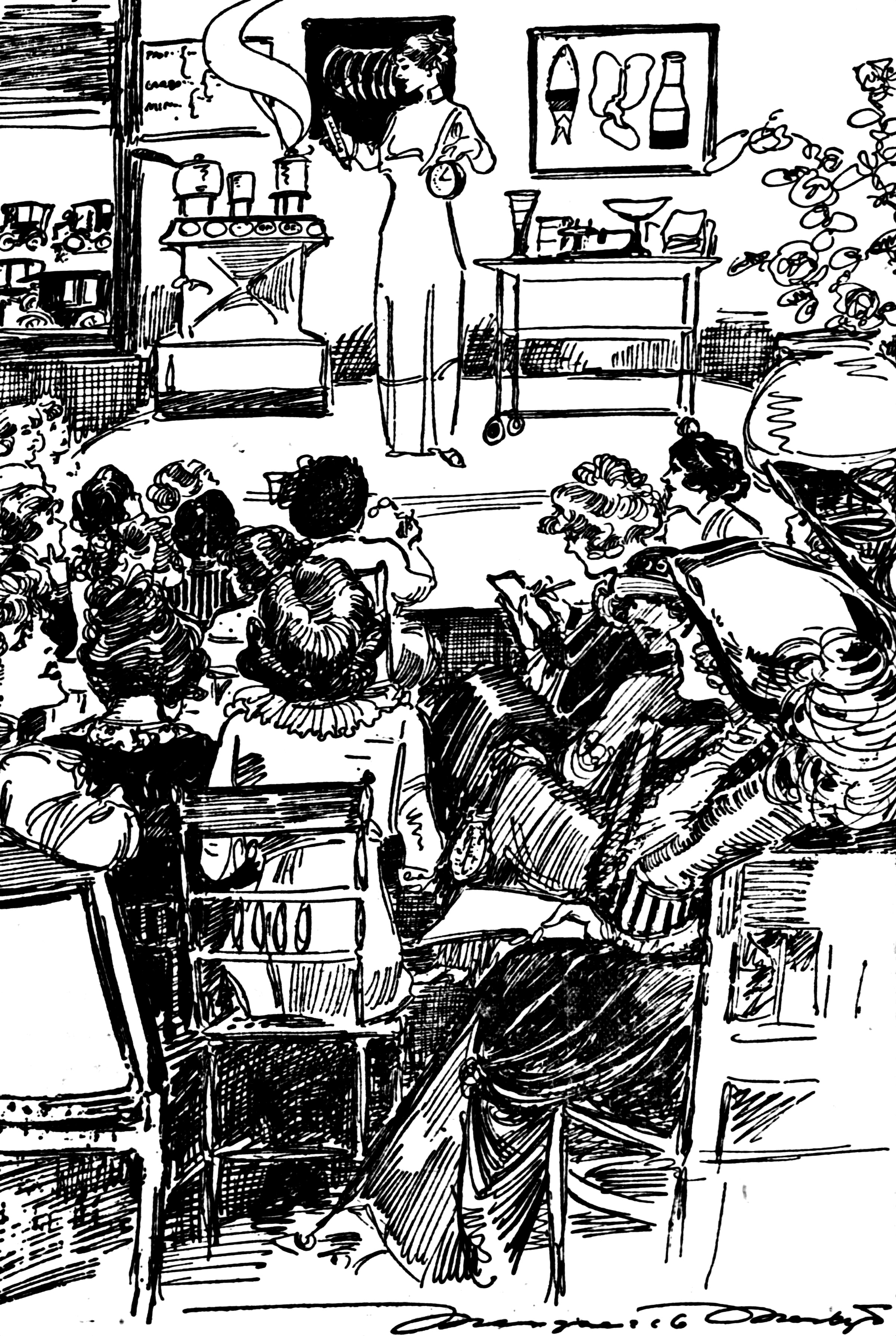
Ana Barrows teaches a cooking class for adults in 1913 St. Louis, Missouri, in this sketch by Marguerite Martyn.

Historically, high schools have offered vocational courses such as home economics, wood and metal shop, typing, business courses, drafting, construction, and auto repair. However, for a number of reasons, many schools have cut those programs. Some schools no longer have the funding to support these programs, and schools have since put more emphasis on academics for all students because of standards based education reform. School-to-Work is a series of federal and state initiatives to link academics to work, sometimes including gaining work experience on a job site without pay.

In 2023, enrollment in "vocational-focused community colleges rose 16%" compared to 2022.

== History ==
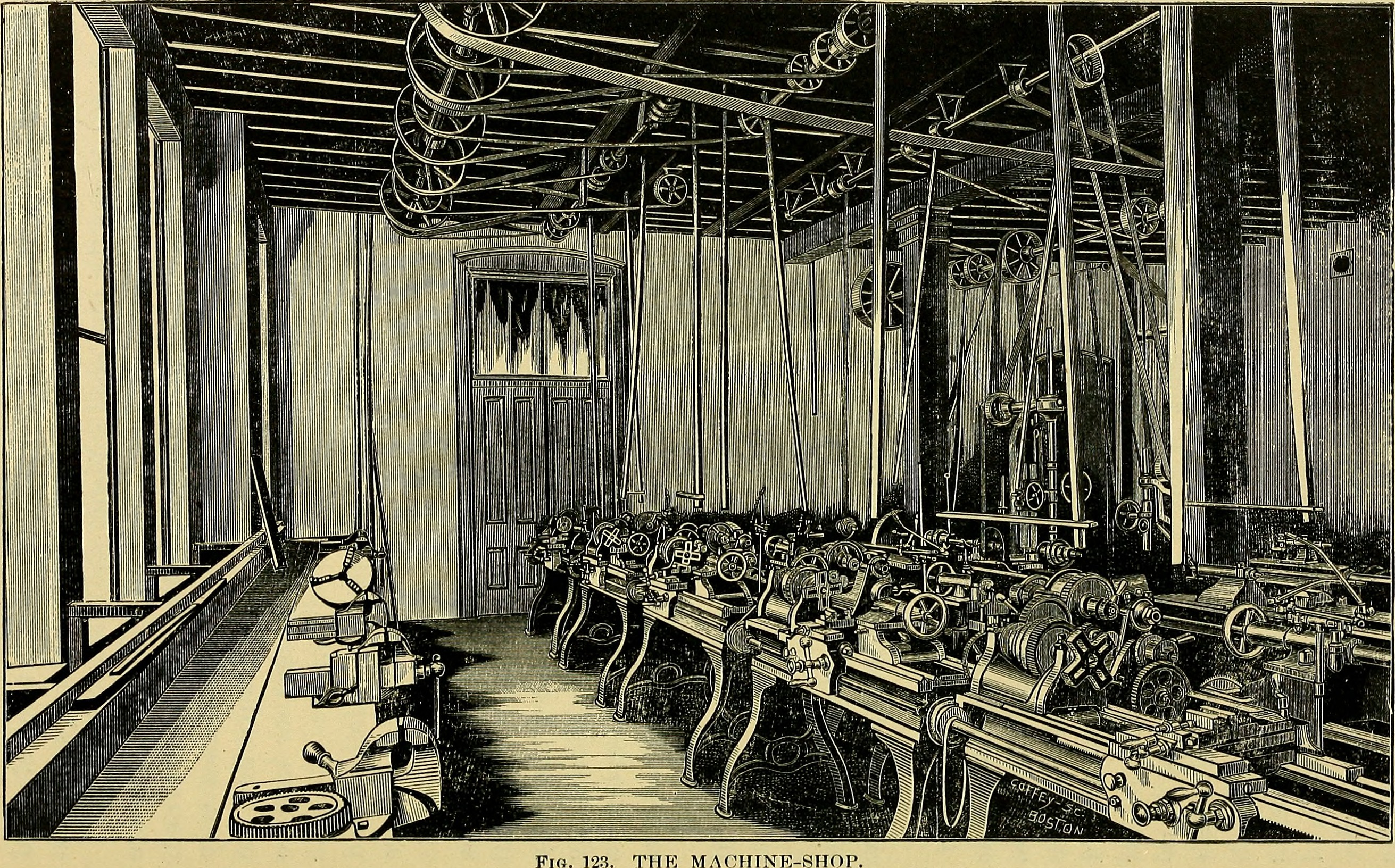
A machine shop in 1906

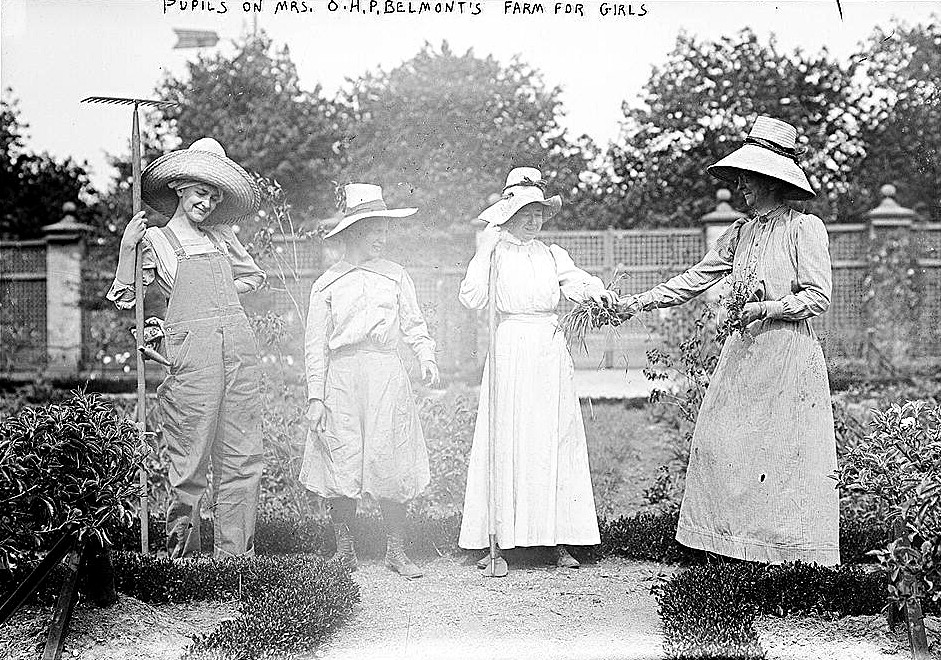
Brookholt School of Agriculture for Women, 1911

In the early 20th century, a number of efforts were made to imitate German-style industrial education in the United States. Researchers such as Holmes Beckwith described the relationship between the apprenticeship and continuation school models in Germany and suggested variants of the system that could be applied in an American context.

=== 1914 to 1960 ===
The industrial education system evolved, after large-scale growth after World War I, into modern vocational education. By the 1960s it was called "Career Technical Education" (CTE). The main steps in the evolution were:

- Vocational education was initiated with the passing of the Smith-Hughes Act in 1917, set up to reduce the reliance on foreign vocational schools, improve domestic wage earning capacity, reduce unemployment, and protect national security.
- In 1947, the George-Barden Act expanded federal support of vocational education to support vocations beyond agriculture, trade, home economics, and industrial subjects.
- The National Defense Education Act of 1958 focused on improving education in science, mathematics, foreign languages, and other critical areas, especially in national defense.

=== Carl D. Perkins Vocational and Technical Education Act ===
- In 1963, the Vocational Education Act added support for vocational education schools for work-study programs and research.
- The Vocational Education Amendments of 1968 modified the Act and created the National Advisory Council on Vocational Education.
- The Vocational Education Act was renamed the Carl D. Perkins Vocational and Technical Education Act in 1984.
- Amendments in 1990 created the Tech-Prep Program, designed to coordinate educational activities into a coherent sequence of courses.
- The Act was renamed the Carl D. Perkins Career and Technical Education Act of 2006.

== Differences between vocational education and traditional education ==
The biggest difference between vocational education and traditional education is the amount of time students need to complete their education. Most vocational institutions offer programs that students can complete in about one year and a half to two years. Students attending traditional colleges often take four to complete their education. Traditional institutions also require students to complete a liberal arts education. Students must enroll in a broad range of courses that are not necessarily related to their area of study. Vocational institutions require students to enroll only in classes that pertain to their particular trades.

By the 1930s many high schools were offering courses in "vocational guidance" designed to help students chose a job when they left school. Studies of the outcomes indicate the guidance courses had modest impact on the students job plans. However those students from poverty backgrounds were much more likely to graduate if they were in the vocational track.

== National programs ==
Federal involvement is carried out originally through the Smith Hughes Act of 1917 and later amendments. In the 21st century the federal role comes principally through the Carl D. Perkins Vocational and Technical Education Act. Accountability requirements tied to the receipt of federal funds under the act help to provide some overall leadership. The Office of Career, Technical, and Adult Education in the US Department of Education also supervises activities funded by the act, along with grants to individual states and other local programs. Persons wishing to teach vocational education may pursue a Bachelor of Vocational Education, which qualifies one to teach vocational education.

The Association for Career and Technical Education (ACTE) is the largest private association dedicated to the advancement of education that prepares youths and adults for careers. Its members include Career and Technical Education (CTE) teachers, administrators, and researchers.

== Job retraining ==
In many states, vocational education is available to workers who have been previously laid off or whose previous employer is defunct. Such teaching was expanded under the American Recovery and Reinvestment Act of 2009. Though results have been, for the most part, inconclusive, job retraining programs have been noted to retain a positive effect on employee morale. Even in cases of displacement, those who underwent job retraining programs exhibited a more positive outlook on their circumstances than those employees who did not partake in job retraining programs. Several studies have also suggested that for layoffs, employees who remain with the company exhibit positive morale and are more motivated in their work environment if the layoffs are handled effectively by the company.

Job retraining programs in the United States are often criticized for their lack of proper focus on skills that are required in existing jobs. A 2009 study by the US Department of Labor showed that the difference in earnings and the chances of being rehired, between those who had been taught and those who had not, was small.

=== Career and Technical Education ===
Career and Technical Education (CTE) programs provide opportunities for high school students to learn in-demand skills and provide a fast track to the work force. Unlike the former "vocational" programs, CTE programs can culminate in postsecondary degrees or certificates. These programs can span from culinary arts and hospitality management to fire science, computer science, and nursing. However, all offerings include a one-year certificate or two-year degree and with a high-skilled hands-on learning experience. Some jurisdictions are introducing CTE alternatives to standard high schools as a means of addressing student engagement and drop-out issues. CTE programs are shown to promote engagement for students who feel disconnected from traditional education models.

== See also ==
- History of education in the United States
- Agricultural education
- Apprenticeship in the United States
- Association for Career and Technical Education, formerly American Vocational Association.
- Carl D. Perkins Vocational and Technical Education Act
- Career and technical education
- Charles A. Prosser
- Community colleges in the United States
- Family and consumer science
- List of states community college systems
- Tech ed.
- Vocational school
- Vocational university
- List of vocational colleges in the United States
