= Porter and Chester Institute =

American for-profit technical school

Coordinates: 41°10′10.4″N 73°8′56.7″W

Porter and Chester Institute is a for-profit technical institute with nine locations and ten career programs throughout Connecticut and Massachusetts in the United States.

== Campuses ==
Porter and Chester Institute has nine campuses located throughout Connecticut and Massachusetts. The main campus is located in Stratford, Connecticut. The other Connecticut campuses are in Waterbury, Rocky Hill, and an affiliate campus in Hamden. In Massachusetts, there are locations in Chicopee, Worcester, Canton, and Brockton.

== History ==
The history of Porter and Chester Institute began in 1946 with the founding of the Porter School of Engineering Design in Hartford, Connecticut.

In 1973, the Porter School of Engineering Design and the Chester Institute for Technical Education of Stratford, Connecticut, merged into one institution. Subsequently, the name Porter and Chester Institute was adopted, and the curricula contents and operational policies of the two institutions were standardized. At the same time, the Porter School, which was located in Rocky Hill, Connecticut, became the Rocky Hill Campus of Porter and Chester Institute.

The Waterbury Campus was established in 1977. In 1979, the Enfield Campus was added. In 1986 the Waterbury Campus was expanded and moved to Watertown, and in 1987 the Rocky Hill Branch was also moved to larger quarters in Wethersfield.

The Chicopee, Massachusetts Campus was established in 1993.

In August 1995, the stockholders of Porter and Chester Institute purchased the Connecticut School of Electronics (CSE). CSE had been established in 1947 in New Haven, CT. In 1996, CSE moved from New Haven to larger quarters in Branford, Connecticut.

In 2002, a new campus was established in Westborough, Massachusetts.

In 2010 PCI further expanded its presence in Eastern Massachusetts by opening branches in Canton and Woburn. The Woburn campus will be the largest campus for Porter and Chester and will allow PCI to better serve the metropolitan areas of Boston, Quincy and Brocton as well as surrounding towns.

In 2009, Porter and Chester Institute was awarded a School of Excellence Award from Accrediting Commission of Career Schools and Colleges (ACCSC).

In October 2014, the Westborough locations closed and moved to Worcester, Massachusetts.

James Bologa is the President and Chief Executive Officer of Porter and Chester Institute.

== Programs ==
The following programs take twelve months in the day and evening.

- Automotive Technology
- Computer Aided Drafting and Design
- Computer and Network Technology
- Industrial, Commercial and Residential Electrician
- Low Voltage Technician
- Welding
- Heating, Ventilation, Air Conditioning and Refrigeration

The following programs take ten months in the day and evening.

- Dental Assisting
- Medical Assisting

The following program takes fifteen months in the day and evening.

- Practical Nursing

== Accreditation and certification ==
=== Accreditation ===
Porter and Chester Institute is accredited by the ACCSC, the Accrediting Bureau of Health Education Schools. The Chicopee Campus Medical Assisting Program is accredited by the Commission on Accreditation of Allied Health Education Programs upon the recommendation of the Curriculum Review Board of the American Association of Medical Assistants Endowment.

=== Approvals ===
Porter and Chester Institute is approved by the Connecticut, and Massachusetts, Commissioner of Higher Education. Porter and Chester Institute is certified by the State of Connecticut Department of Motor Vehicles as an official I/M240 Training Facility.
