= Onondaga School of Therapeutic Massage =

- Motto: Change lives. Start with Yours.
- Type: Private for-profit massage school
- Active: 1997–2021
- Location: Syracuse & Rochester, New York, United States

The Onondaga School of Therapeutic Massage (OSTM) was a private for-profit massage school with campuses in Syracuse and Rochester, New York. Founded by Douglas Van D’Elia and Elizabeth Goldenberg, the Onondaga School of Therapeutic Massage was approved by the New York State Department of Education in 1997. The school was named after the region where the first campus is located, the Onondaga County region of New York. A branch campus opened in Rochester, NY in 2000.

The Onondaga School of Therapeutic Massage closed its doors December 10th, 2021 at both the Syracuse and Rochester locations. A buyer was looking into buying the Rochester location and reopening, but nothing ever came of that and the website no longer exists.

OSTM provided students with a massage therapy education through the New York State Department of Education. After completion of a 1,000 hour program (over 6, 12 or 15 months), graduates were eligible to take the New York State Board examination for licensure in Massage Therapy .

Per New York State requirements, students complete 1000 hours of massage therapy education, including:

- Anatomy and physiology with Neurology
- Myology
- Pathology
- Swedish massage
- Shiatsu
- Sports massage
- Other coursework (Business, Law, Pregnancy Massage, Chair Massage, Treatment Techniques, CPR/First Aid, etc.)

== See also ==
- List of defunct colleges and universities in New York
