= Cambridge College =

Private college in Boston, Massachusetts

Coordinates: 42°22′8.0″N 71°6′39.2″W

- Type: Private college
- Established: 1971
- Endowment: $11.1 million
- President: Deborah Jackson
- Undergraduates: 1,209
- Postgraduates: 1,591
- Location: Boston, Massachusetts, United States
- Campus: Urban
- Colors: Blue & White
- Website: cambridgecollege.edu

Cambridge College is a private college based in Boston, Massachusetts, United States. It also operates a regional center in San Juan, Puerto Rico.

In July 2024, Bay Path University acquired Cambridge College, although as of 2026 the two institutions operate under separate names.

== History ==
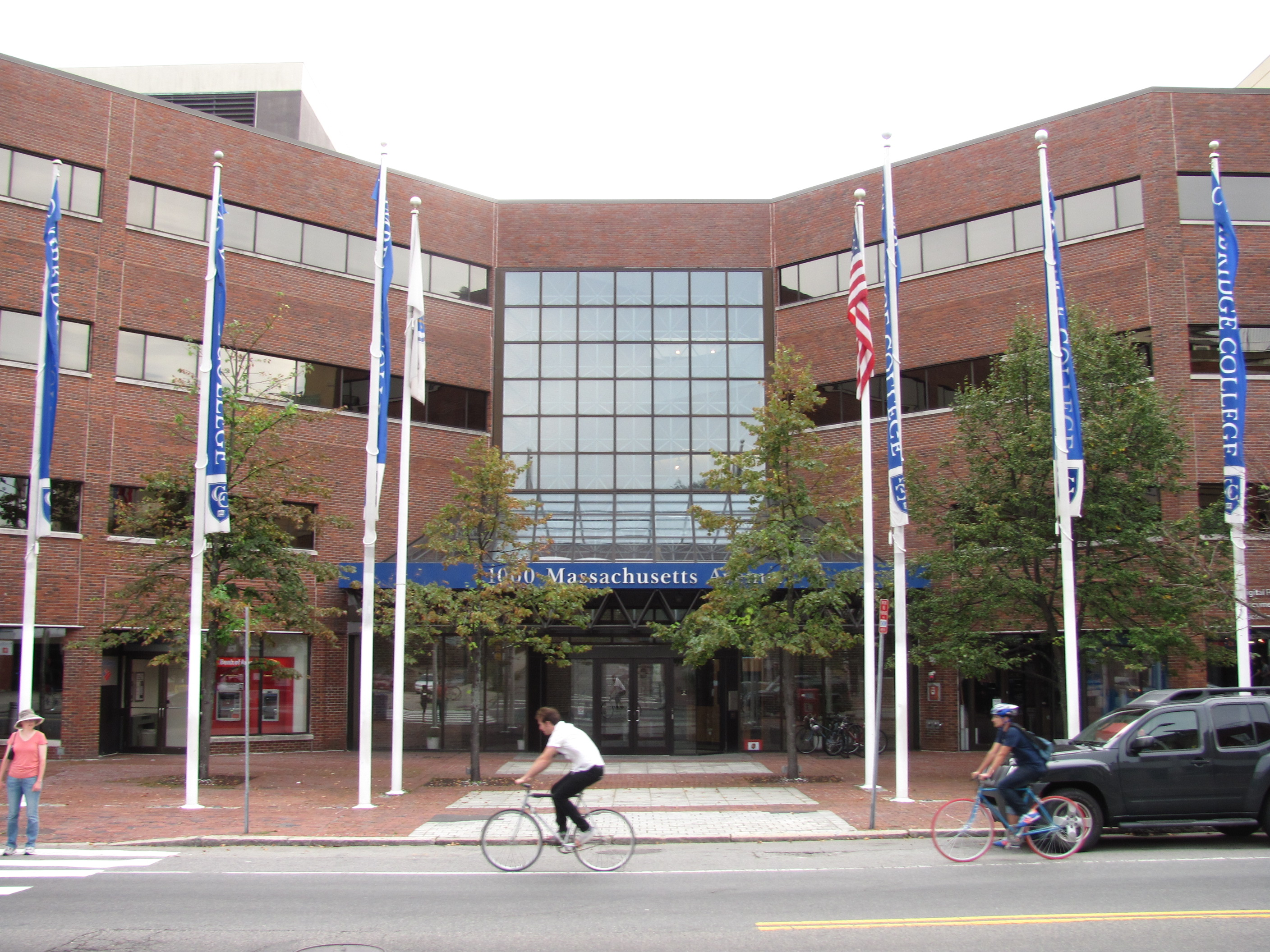
Cambridge College's former building in Cambridge

=== Founding ===
Cambridge College had its beginnings as an innovative graduate program created by Eileen Moran Brown and Joan Goldsmith in the newly created Institute of Open Education (IOE) in 1971 formed by John Bremer at Newton College of the Sacred Heart. Students in education programs were given individual attention: for example, through critiques of videotaped student performance on the job. Within two years, Brown and Goldsmith were directing the IOE, and later affiliated the IOE with Antioch College, where Brown was named Dean. In 1979, Brown began the 18-month process of elevating the graduate program to an independent, fully accredited institution that was named Cambridge College.

=== 1990s ===
A 2003 article in The Wall Street Journal reported that in 1996, the New England Association of Schools and Colleges had cited "quality control of academic achievement" as an "issue of overriding concern which is central to the academic credibility of the college" with reference to the graduate program in education. The article discussed the lack of rigorous entrance requirements and grade inflation in the program as areas of concern.

=== 2000s ===
John Bremer was invited to Cambridge College (2005–08), where he was appointed to the Elizabeth J. McCormack Chair in the Humanities. The McCormack Chair was subsequently held by Dr. Gitte Wernaa and Dr. Rebecca Heimel.

As of 2011, the college was one of 1,900 "military-friendly" institutions belonging to the Servicemembers Opportunity Colleges (SOC) consortium. The college was no longer listed as of 2017.

In 2017, Cambridge College consolidated its four locations in Cambridge into a single campus in the Hood Office Park in Charlestown, a neighborhood of Boston.

In March 2020, Cambridge College acquired the New England College of Business and Finance, renaming it the New England Institute of Business at Cambridge College. In 2021, this branch of the College was rebranded as Cambridge College Global.

In July 2024, Cambridge College was acquired by Bay Path University, but retains its separate identity.

== Academics ==
Cambridge College Global offers fully online Associate of Science, Bachelor of Science, Bachelor of Arts, Master of Science, Master of Business Administration, and Doctor of Business Administration degrees in addition to various certificates.

=== Accreditation and authorization ===
Cambridge College is accredited by the New England Commission of Higher Education. It is also authorized to operate by the California Bureau for Private Post-Secondary and Vocational Education and the Council on Higher Education of Puerto Rico.

== Notable alumni ==
- Brad Hatfield, professor at Berklee College of Music
- Joe Polisena, Rhode Island politician
