= Pinnacle Career Institute =

Private for-profit technical career school in Kansas City, Missouri

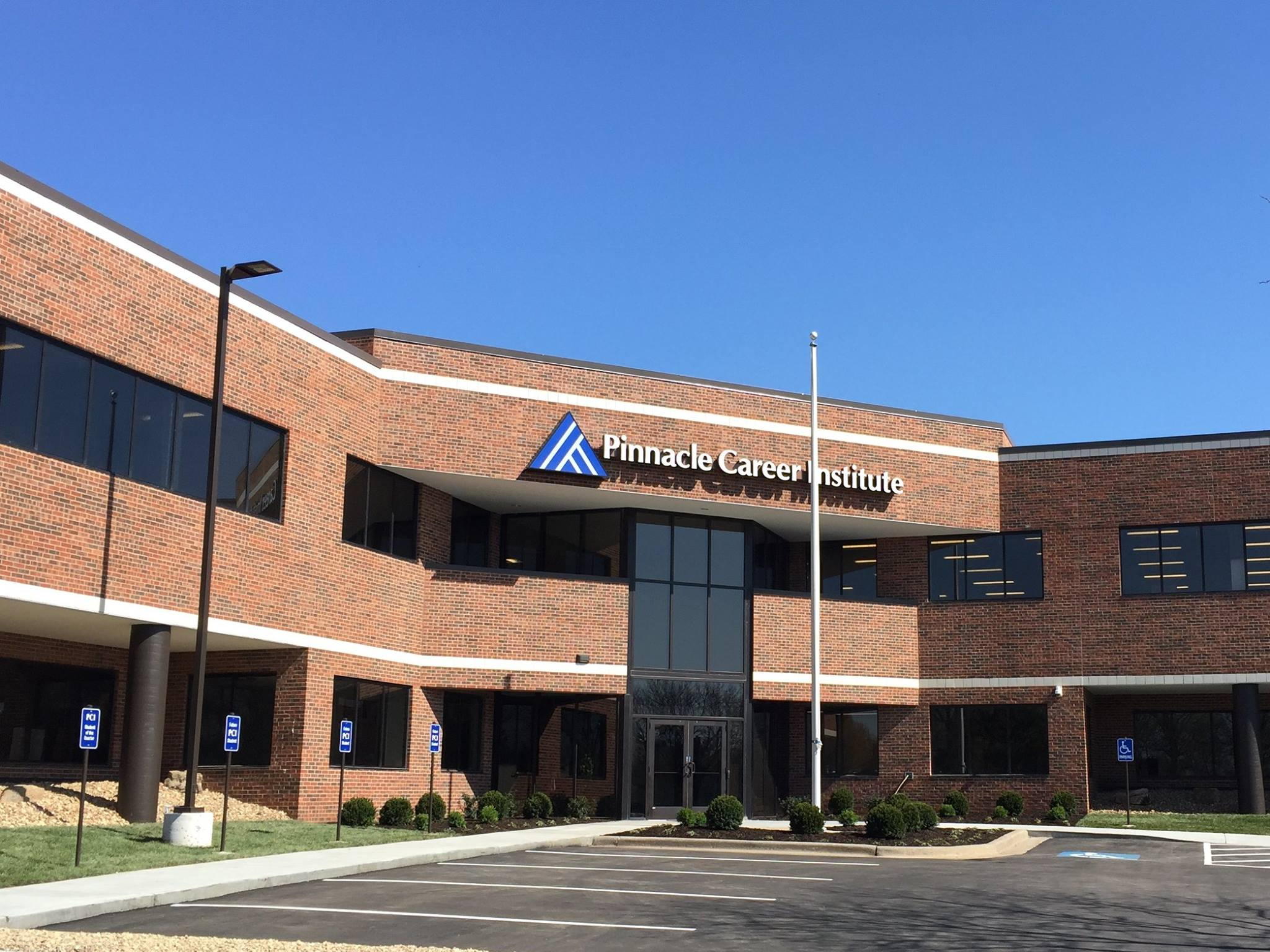
The South Campus of Pinnacle Career Institute as viewed from Hickman Mills Drive.

Pinnacle Career Institute (PCI) is a private for-profit technical career school in Kansas City, Missouri. It offers training and certifications in the wind, tower, and HVAC industries. Programs are also offered online.

== History ==
PCI was founded as the "Electronic Institute" at the south Kansas City location in 1953. In 1992, Jeffery and Scott Freeman purchased the business and began expanding its programs. The school changed its name in September 2002 to Pinnacle Career Institute. PCI's Lawrence, Kansas location was originally the Center for Training in Business and Industry. In 1998, Scott F. and Jeffrey C. Freeman acquired the school, and it soon became Lawrence Career College. On February 3, 2003, the school was changed to Pinnacle Career Institute to join its sister school in south Kansas City, Missouri. In January 2005, Pinnacle Career Institute started teaching distance education programs through a web-based Learning Management System. Online education is delivered year-round. The North Kansas City campus opened in April 2008.

== Academics ==
All of Pinnacle Career Institute's programs are in an accelerated format. Students can complete most programs in one to two years. Programs at Pinnacle Career Institute include HVAC Technician, Tower Technician, and Wind Turbine Technician. Pinnacle Career Institute maintains online education programs available year-round. The institution also maintains Flex Education programs, which are a hybrid of on-campus and online learning.

Pinnacle Career Institute is nationally accredited through the Accrediting Commission of Career Schools and Colleges and recognized by the Department of Education as a provider of career training.
