= Chef2chef =

Culinary website

Chef2Chef.net
- Type: Privately Held Company
- Industry: Culinary education and information
- Founded: Foster City, CA
- Headquarters: Foster City, CA, USA
- Key people: Seth Restaino, General manager; Alisa Stoudt; Managing Editor; Tracy Viselli, Social Media Manager
- Website: http://www.chef2chef.net

Chef2Chef.net is a culinary website with recipes, columns, food-related forums and blogs, chef interviews, and online cooking classes. The site has an index and search tool that includes culinary schools in the U.S. and around the globe with information available by city, state, and country. Chef2Chef has a restaurant and food services employment job board for job seekers and employers and a Marketplace with equipment, services, and supplies for the chef consumer and food service organizations. The site also posts information about industry scholarships and grants, food-related festivals and events, and farmers markets across the U.S. and Canada.

== Background ==
Chef2Chef was co-founded in 1999 by David and Pamela Nelson and partners, Fred and Margie Roosli. QuinStreet, Inc., an online marketing company based in Foster City, CA acquired the site in October 2006.

== Recognition ==
In 2002, PC Magazine Website Rover editors rated Chef2Chef.net the Editor's Choice of their top eight culinary websites.
