= Empire Beauty Schools =

Chain of cosmetology schools in the United States

- Trade name: Empire Beauty Schools
- Native name: Empire Education Group
- Type: Private subsidiary of Regis Corporation
- Industry: Beauty school, cosmetology, training provider
- Founded: 1934
- Headquarters: Pottsville, Pennsylvania
- Area served: United States
- Products: Beauty Education
- Services: Beauty Education
- Parent: Empire Education Group

Empire Beauty School is a chain of for-profit cosmetology schools in the United States. Headquartered in Pottsville, Pennsylvania, it is the largest system of cosmetology schools in the country. Founded in 1946, it currently has 76 schools nationwide. It trains students as cosmetologists, estheticians, electrologists, hair stylists and colorists, makeup artists, manicurists and nail technicians.

== History ==
In 2010, Empire Beauty Schools acquired the Northern Westchester School of Hairdressing and Cosmetology in Peekskill, New York, as well as the International Academy of Cosmetology School in Cincinnati, Ohio.

Empire Beauty Schools opened the company's 100th campus in Springfield, Pennsylvania, in 2010. The school was inaugurated during Empire Education Group's 100 Days of Empire event.

The newest eco-friendly schools were opened in West Palm Beach, Florida, Pineville, North Carolina, and Paramus, New Jersey. All of the cosmetology schools incorporated eco-conscious elements such as energy- and water-saving features.

Since its peak in 2010, Empire closed 1 school in 2011, 5 schools in 2014, 10 schools in 2015, 11 schools in 2016, 8 schools in 2018, 4 schools in 2019, and 8 schools in 2020.

In early 2020, Empire Education Group acquired Regis' financial stake in the company.

== Student outcomes ==
According to the College Scorecard, the median salary after attending Empire Beauty School ranges from $16,000 to $21,000. Graduation rates vary from 21 percent to 84 percent.
