= Golf Academy of America =

American sports academy

- Active: 1974–2018
- Location: United States

Golf Academy of America was a private, two-year golf college offering an associate degree in Golf Operations and Management with a curriculum of golf instruction and golf business management. A bachelor's degree was also offered via a partnership with New England College of Business.

== Accreditation ==
"Action to Withdraw Accreditation by Suspension" was initiated by ACICS on December 4, 2018. Previously, Golf Academy of America was accredited by the ACICS to award occupational associate degrees. It was further authorized to award Associate of Applied Business Degrees in California, Arizona and South Carolina and Occupational associate degrees in Florida.

== History ==
Started in 1974 in San Diego as the San Diego Golf Academy, it is the oldest golf school in the world. It was acquired by the Education Corporation of America in 2006, later renaming it to the Golf Academy of America in 2008. Prior to acquisition by ECA, SDGA briefly opened a Honolulu campus in Kaneohe, Hawaii on the island of Oahu from 2004-2007 to cater to the Pacific Rim.

=== Permanently Closed ===
The schools are owned by Birmingham, Alabama-based Education Corp. of America (ECA), which runs more than 75 campuses across the U.S. A statement on ECA's student information page announced the December 2018 closure of its campuses, including those operating as Brightwood College, Brightwood Career Institute, Ecotech Institute, Golf Academy of America and Virginia College. The move comes after the Accrediting Council for Independent Colleges and Schools suspended ECA'S accreditation on Dec. 4.

== Notable alumni ==
- Brett Melson, 2007 Recorded Longest Hole in One ever recorded at the 18th hole of the Koolau G.C. on the island of Oahu. http://www.cybergolf.com/golf_news/longest_holeinone_in_history_recorded
- Dr. Steven Lorick gained acclaim as the golf performance expert for World Golf Hall of Famer Se Ri Pak and Hall of Fame Golf Professional David Leadbetter. https://www.mytpi.com/experts/STEVENLORICK

== Notable faculty ==
- Buddy Allin, Five time winner on the PGA tour and author of the golf-instruction book Center-Line
