= Remington College =

American chain of private schools

- Motto: Real Skills for the Real World
- Type: Private non-profit
- Established: 1987
- Location: United States
- Campus: Multiple
- Website: remingtoncollege.edu

Remington College is a common name used by all 11 campuses of a group of private colleges throughout the United States. Remington College operates 11 campuses in several US states, and some of the affiliated institutions have been in operation since the 1940s.

The oldest campus is the former Spencer Business College in Lafayette, Louisiana, founded in 1940. Remington College offers degree and diploma programs that vary by campus in career fields, including business, information technology, criminal justice, electronics, graphic arts, beauty, and the health sciences.

== Campuses ==
- Online, Distance Learning
- Baton Rouge, Louisiana
- Cleveland, Ohio
- Dallas, Texas
- Fort Worth, Texas
- Houston (League City), Texas
- Lafayette, Louisiana
- Memphis, Tennessee
- Mobile, Alabama
- Nashville, Tennessee
- Shreveport, Louisiana

== Online degree programs ==
Remington College announced, in October 2009, online programs for students in over 40 states.

== Accreditation ==
Remington College has been part of the U.S. higher-education community since 1987. Each campus is accredited by the Accrediting Commission of Career Schools and Colleges (ACCSC).
