= Culinard =

American culinary school

Coordinates: 33.4708°N 86.8182°W

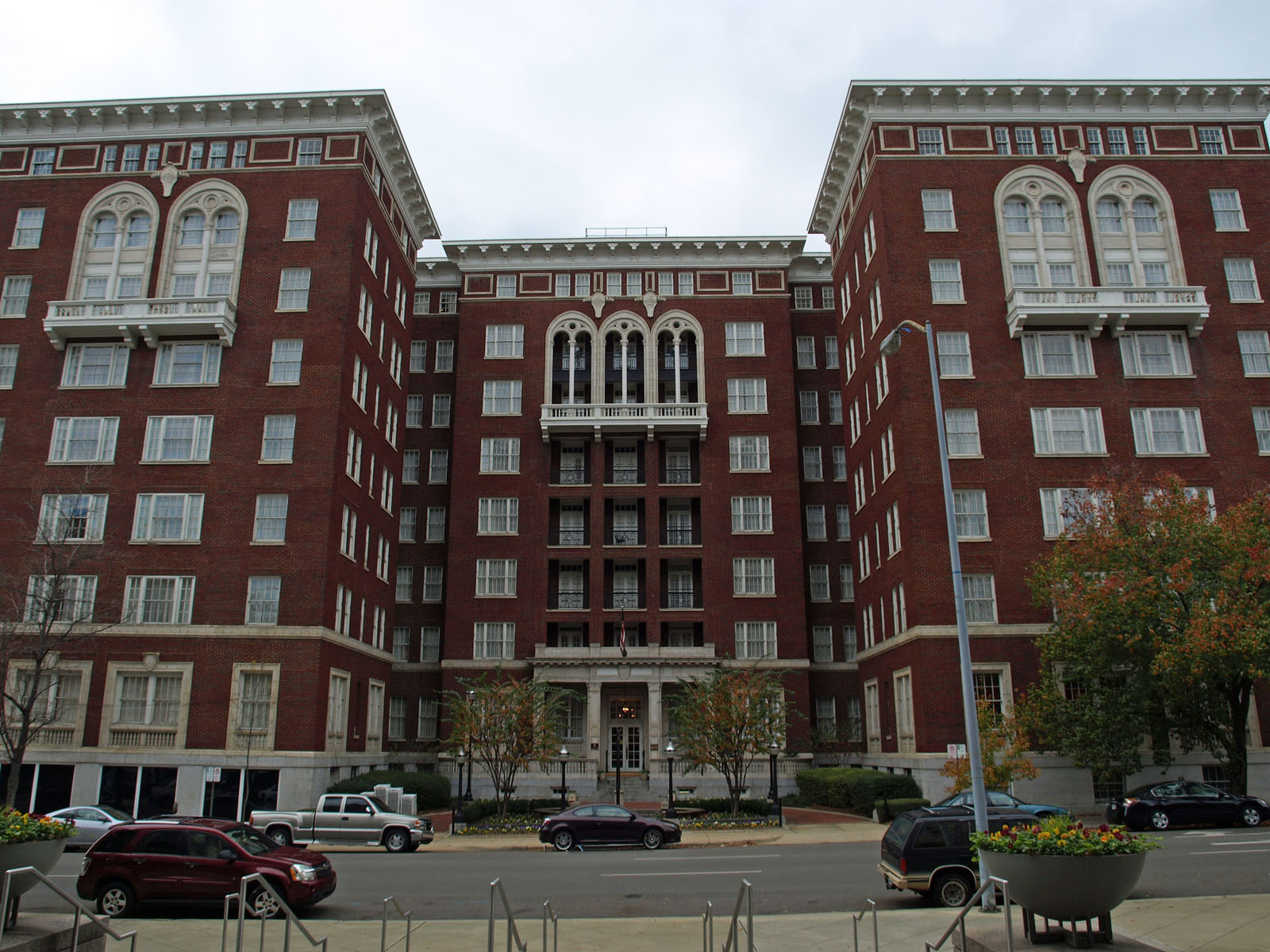
- Type: For-profit
- Active: 2000–2018
- Owner: Educational Corporation of America
- Location: Birmingham (Main Campus), Alabama, USA

Culinard was a culinary school owned by Education Corporation of America. It opened in 2000 as part of the Birmingham, Alabama branch of Virginia College. The second campus opened with the establishment of the Jacksonville, Florida branch of Virginia College in 2009. Additional Culinard campuses operated at Virginia College campuses in Mobile, Alabama; Richmond, Virginia; Chattanooga, Tennessee, and Savannah, Georgia. This school closed in December 2018 following Educational Corporation of America's shutdown.

Culinard offered two 36-week educational programs: a Culinary Arts Diploma and a Pastry Arts Diploma. An online Culinary Arts associate degree was also available if certain criteria are met (e.g., having already had formal training in culinary skills at a post-secondary level.

== Teaching faculty ==
The school's Culinary Dean was Chef Antony Osborne, a European Master Pastry Chef with educational degrees earned and experience training with culinary institutes such as Westminster College and the Ealing College of London, Slough Polytechnic University in England and Sullivan University in Kentucky. Osborne is a recipient of the Golden Lion Award, the highest culinary award in Asia, and was named one of the Top Ten Pastry Chefs in the United States in 2006.

Twenty-nine other Culinary and Pastry chef instructors at Culinard contributed a variety of international experience, cultural diversity and professional expertise to the teaching curriculum. They included recipients of local and international awards who participated in several TV episodes of Food Network’s “Unwrapped,” “Dining Around,” "Sugar Inventions Challenge” and programs on the DIY Network.

=== Awards ===
Culinard was named among the nation's best culinary programs in 2011 by Chef2chef, a culinary web portal.

=== Restaurants ===
Culinard operated four public restaurants as teaching establishments for professional chef staff, providing a learning lab environment for culinary and pastry arts students. The Café at Cahaba Grand, located in the Cahaba Grand Conference Center in Birmingham, Alabama, offered a full hot breakfast and lunch daily. The Café at Innovation Depot was a 3,700-square-foot European-style bakery open to the public that featured baked goods, gelato, and catering services. Century Restaurant and Bar was located in the Tutwiler Hotel in Birmingham, Alabama. Kitchen on George, located in the Oakleigh Historic District of Mobile, Alabama, offered fresh, contemporary American food in a casual atmosphere.

=== Accreditation ===
Culinard was accredited by the ACICS and its programs were accredited by the American Culinary Federation.
