= Delta Technical College =

- Motto: Learn Today. Earn Tomorrow.
- Type: Private for-profit trade school
- Established: 2004
- Founders: Brian K. Huff
- Location: Horn Lake, Mississippi, United States; 34.960537°N 90.003904°W
- Website: www.deltatechnicalcollege.com

Delta Technical College (Delta Tech) is a private for-profit career college in Horn Lake, Mississippi. It was founded in 2004 and is a branch school of Midwest Technical Institute based in Springfield, Illinois. Delta Technical College has campuses in Horn Lake and Ridgeland.

The college is regulated and licensed to operate by the Mississippi Commission on Proprietary School and College Registration and License #C-624.
