= Mitchell Technical College =

Technical school in Mitchell, South Dakota, U.S.

Coordinates: 43.6876372°N 98.0049928°W

- Type: Technical school
- Established: 1968; 58 years ago
- President: Mark Wilson
- Vice-president: John Heemstra
- Students: 1,187
- Location: 1800 East Spruce Street, Mitchell, South Dakota, U.S.
- Nickname: Mavericks
- Website: www.mitchelltech.edu

- Location within South Dakota Location within the United States

Mitchell Technical College (Mitchell Tech), formerly Mitchell Technical Institute, is a public technical school with its main campus in Mitchell, South Dakota. Mitchell Tech was founded in 1968. It offers 35 associate degree programs and 15 certificate programs. Since 1980, Mitchell Tech has been accredited by the Higher Learning Commission.

In October 2014, the school received a $1 million donation, the largest sum ever granted to any technical school in South Dakota.

In March 2024, the Ag Power Diesel Building opened.
