= New England College of Business and Finance =

New England College of Business
- Former names: New England College of Finance; American Banking Institute /New England College of Business and Finance
- Motto in English: "Integrity. Knowledge. Leadership"
- Type: Private
- Established: 1909
- Parent institution: Cambridge College
- President: Howard Horton
- Location: Boston, Massachusetts, United States
- Campus: Online
- Website: www.necb.edu

New England College of Business (NECB) was a private college in Boston, Massachusetts. Founded in 1909, NECB granted associate, bachelor's, and graduate degrees in business, digital marketing and international business. It is accredited by the New England Commission of Higher Education.As of 2020, the school no longer operates independently and is a subdivision of Cambridge College.

== History ==
NECB was founded as the American Banking Institute (ABI) in 1909, the institute was later incorporated by the Commonwealth of Massachusetts in 1914.

ABI received their degree-granting authority in 1979 from the Board of Regents of Higher Education in Massachusetts to offer an associate degree in business administration. In 1985, ABI received full college accreditation from the New England Association of Schools and College – the only bank sponsored educational institution in America to become accredited as a degree-granting college. In 1988, the member banks associated with ABI expanded throughout New England and later voted to change the name to the New England Banking Institute.

Following the adoption of the name The New England Banking Institute (NEBI), NEBI received official licensure from the state of Connecticut Department of Higher Education in 1990. Connecticut was the first state outside of Massachusetts to recognize Boston-based NEBI as a degree-granting college. Rhode Island approved NEBI in 1993, while New Hampshire recognized the college in 1997. In 1998, The New England Banking Institute changed names to New England College of Finance.

=== NECB Online ===
In 2002, NECF selected the Alfred P. Sloan Foundation as a partner to deliver their degree programs online. The first online degree programs were delivered through NECFOnline.

In 2004, UC Berkeley adopted NECF's finance curriculum to include in their post-baccalaureate level online certificate program for college graduates in banking and investment management sectors. The "Accelerated Program in Financial Services" was launched in April 2004. UC Berkeley credits were transferred into master's programs at prominent NECF partner colleges.

In 2008, NECF changed its name to New England College of Business and Finance and was also granted degree elevation authority. In 2009, NECB introduced its Bachelor of Science in Business Administration (BSBA), a Master of Science in finance (MSF), and the nation's first Master of Science in Business Ethics and Compliance (MBEC).

In 2010, NECB began working with Banker's Academy to develop enhanced educational opportunities and degree completion options to students. Courses taken through Banker's Academy may transfer as credit to one of NECB's online degree programs, including: Bachelor's degrees focused in marketing, management, business administration, banking and finance, or accounting.

In 2011, New England College of Business introduced its Master of Business Administration (MBA) program. Since 2011, the college has introduced two additional graduate programs: Master of Human Resource Management (MHRM) and Master of Healthcare Management (MHM). Two additional undergraduate programs have also begun during that time period: Bachelor of Science in Digital Marketing (BSDM) and Bachelor of Science in International Business (BSIB).

== Academics ==
=== Accreditation ===
New England College of Business (NECB) was accredited by the New England Commission of Higher Education and approved by the Massachusetts Department of Higher Education.

=== Undergraduate programs ===
The school offered an Associate degree in business and a Bachelor of Science degree in three different business-related programs.

=== Graduate programs ===
The school offered five master's degree programs and accepted admission applications throughout the year. All coursework was delivered via an instructional model that integrated video lectures, audio feedback and peer interaction. Students had access to professors and practitioners, as well as library resources. The NECB technology platform allowed students to work on or offline with access to all course materials.
