= Midwest Technical Institute =

- Other names: MTI
- Type: Private for-profit trade school
- Established: 1995
- Students: 2,122
- Location: Springfield, Illinois, United States; 39.840547°N 89.59439°W
- Campus: 1.15 acres (0.47 ha)
- Website: www.midwesttech.edu

Midwest Technical Institute (MTI) is a private for-profit trade school in Springfield, Illinois. The college focuses on the mechanical trades, allied health, cosmetology, and commercial driving fields.

Midwest Technical Institute has branch campuses in East Peoria, Illinois, Moline, Illinois, Springfield, Illinois, and Springfield, Missouri. Delta Technical College is a branch school of Midwest Technical Institute.

== See also ==
- University of Illinois Springfield
