= Todd S. Nelson =

American businessman

- Education: Brigham Young University, University of Nevada, Reno
- Occupations: CEO, Perdoceo Education Corporation

Todd S. Nelson is an American businessman who has been the CEO of three of America's largest for-profit college chains: Apollo Group, Education Management Corporation, and Career Education Corporation. He is currently the Executive Chairman of Perdoceo Education Corporation, the parent company of Colorado Technical University, American Intercontinental University, and Trident University International.

== Early life ==
Todd S. Nelson earned a Bachelor of Science degree in 1982 from Brigham Young University and an MBA from the University of Nevada, Reno in 1983. He was a faculty member at the University of Nevada Las Vegas from 1983 to 1984.

== Apollo Group (1987–2006) ==
Nelson started with Apollo Group in 1987 as the director of the University of Phoenix's Utah campus, and was named executive vice president of University of Phoenix in 1989, vice president of Apollo Group in 1994, president of Apollo Group in 1998, CEO of Apollo in 2001, and chairman of the board in 2004. During Nelson's tenure, the company changed its business practices from relying on corporate investments in employee education and enrolling mid-level employees at major companies to relying on government funds and open enrollment. Nelson resigned in 2006 after University of Phoenix faced allegations of illegal business practices. At the time of Nelson's resignation, Apollo Group's annual revenues were $2.2 billion with an enrollment of more than 300,000 students. Nelson's compensation package was $22.1 million in 2005, with a 5-year compensation of $61 million. His compensation package in 2006 was $41.3 million.

== Education Management Corporation (2007–2015) ==
Nelson was CEO of Education Management (EDMC) from 2007 to 2015, bringing several Apollo Group executives to the company. EDMC's schools included the Art Institutes, Argosy University, Brown Mackie College, and South University. During his time at EDMC, the company grew into the second largest US for-profit college chain and faced allegations of illegal enrolment tactics. Nelson's highest annual compensation was $13.1 million. In 2017, EDMC filed for bankruptcy.

== Career Education Corporation-Perdoceo (2015–present) ==
Nelson was the CEO of Perdoceo Education Corporation (formerly known as Career Education Corporation) from 2015 to 2022. Nelson guided the company through several school closings, including the shuttering of Le Cordon Bleu, Briarcliffe College and Sanford-Brown campuses. Perdoceo is the parent company of Colorado Technical University, American Intercontinental University, and Trident University International. In 2019, Nelson made $7.4 million in total compensation. He currently holds about $12 million in equities from the company. In January 2022, Nelson stepped down as CEO of Perdoceo but continued as Executive Chairman.

== See also ==
- Apollo Group
- Career Education Corporation
- Education Management Corporation
- For-profit colleges in the United States
- For-profit higher education in the United States
- Perdoceo Education Corporation
