= List of Pi Theta Epsilon chapters =

Pi Theta Epsilon is the scholastic honor society of the American Occupational Therapy Foundation. In the following list of chapters, active chapters are indicated in bold and inactive chapters are in italics.

Chapter	Charter date	Institution	Location	Status	Ref.
**Alpha**	1959	University of New Hampshire	Durham, New Hampshire	Active	
**Beta**	1959	Colorado State University	Fort Collins, Colorado	Active	
Gamma	1959	Western Michigan University	Kalamazoo, Michigan	Inactive	(Note: Chapter established at Kalamazoo State University, now Western Michigan University.)
**Delta Denton**	1959	Texas Woman's University	Denton, Texas	Active	
**Delta Dallas**		Texas Woman's University - Dallas	Dallas, Texas	Active	
**Delta Houston**		Texas Woman's University - Houston	Houston, Texas	Active	
**Epsilon**		Eastern Michigan University	Ypsilanti, Michigan	Active	
**Zeta**		Mount Mary University	Milwaukee, Wisconsin	Active	
**Eta**		Wayne State University	Detroit, Michigan	Active	
Theta		Tufts University	Medford, Massachusetts	Inactive	
**Iota**		Indiana University Indianapolis	Indianapolis, Indiana	Active	
**Kappa**		University of North Dakota	Grand Forks, North Dakota	Active	
**Lambda**		Ohio State University	Columbus, Ohio	Active	
**Mu**		Florida International University	Miami, Florida	Active	
**Nu**		University of Texas Medical Branch at Galveston	Galveston, Texas	Active	
**Xi**		Washington University In St. Louis	St. Louis County, Missouri	Active	
**Omicron**		Boston University	Boston, Massachusetts	Active	
**Pi**		Temple University	Philadelphia, Pennsylvania	Active	
**Rho**		University of Wisconsin–Milwaukee	Milwaukee, Wisconsin	Active	
**Sigma**		University of Texas Health Science Center at San Antonio	San Antonio, Texas	Active	
**Tau**		University of Buffalo	Buffalo, New York	Active	
**Upsilon**		Elizabethtown College	Elizabethtown, Pennsylvania	Active	
**Phi**		Virginia Commonwealth University	Richmond, Virginia	Active	
**Chi**		Quinnipiac University	Hamden, Connecticut	Active	
**Psi**		Misericordia University	Dallas, Pennsylvania	Active	
**Omega**	2023	Iona University	New Rochelle, New York	Active	
Alpha Alpha				Inactive	
**Alpha Beta**		University of Alabama at Birmingham	Birmingham, Alabama	Active	
**Alpha Gamma**		University of Kansas	Lawrence, Kansas	Active	
**Alpha Delta**		St. Catherine University	Saint Paul, Minnesota	Active	
**Alpha Epsilon**		Texas Tech University Health Sciences Center	Lubbock, Texas	Active	
**Alpha Zeta**		Eastern Kentucky University	Richmond, Kentucky	Active	
**Alpha Eta**		University of Southern California	Los Angeles, California	Active	
**Alpha Theta**		Medical University of South Carolina	Charleston, South Carolina	Active	
**Alpha Iota**		Creighton University	Omaha, Nebraska	Active	
**Alpha Kappa**		SUNY Downstate Medical Center	New York City, New York	Active	
**Alpla Lambda**	2023	University of Cincinnati	Cincinnati, Ohio	Active	
**Alpha Mu**	2023	Trinity Washington University	Washington, D.C.	Active	
**Alpha Nu**		St. Ambrose University	Davenport, Iowa	Active	
Alpha Xi		Baker College	Flint, Michigan	Inactive	
**Alpha Omicron**		University of Toledo College of Medicine and Life Sciences	Toledo, Ohio	Active	(Note: Chapter was chartered at the Medical College of Ohio, which merged with the University of Toledo to form the University of Toledo College of Medicine and Life Sciences in 2006.)
**Alpha Pi**		Touro University Nevada	Henderson, Nevada	Active	
**Alpha Pi**		Touro University Bay Shore	Bay Shore, New York	Active	
**Alpha Pi**		Touro University Manhattan	New York City, New York	Active	
**Alpha Pi**		Touro College Brooklyn	Brooklyn, New York	Inactive	
**Alpha Rho**		D'Youville College	Buffalo, New York	Active	
**Alpha Sigma**		Keuka College	Keuka Park, New York	Active	
**Alpha Tau**		University of South Dakota	Vermillion, South Dakota	Active	
Alpha Upsilon		Tuskegee University	Tuskegee, Alabama	Inactive	
**Alpha Phi**	2023	University of Nevada, Las Vegas	Paradise, Nevada	Active	
**Alpha Chi**		University of Texas at El Paso	El Paso, Texas	Active	
**Alpha Psi**		University of New England	Biddeford, Maine	Active	
**Alpha Omega**		Wingate University	Wingate, North Carolina	Active	
**Beta Alpha**		Howard University	Washington, D.C.	Active	
**Beta Beta**		Tennessee State University	Nashville, Tennessee	Active	
**Beta Gamma**		Saint Louis University	St. Louis, Missouri	Active	
**Beta Delta**		Nova Southeastern University Fort Lauderdale/Davie campus	Fort Lauderdale, Florida	Active	
**Beta Delta**		Nova Southeastern University Tampa Bay Regional Campus	Tampa, Florida	Active	
Beta Epsilon		University of Washington	Seattle, Washington	Inactive	
Beta Zeta				Inactive	
**Beta Eta**		Xavier University	Cincinnati, Ohio	Active	
**Beta Theta**		Duquesne University	Pittsburgh, Pennsylvania	Active	
**Beta Iota**	2023	University of the Pacific	Stockton, California	Active	
**Beta Kappa**		Saginaw Valley State University	University Center, Michigan	Active	
Beta Lambda		University of Southern Indiana	Evansville, Indiana	Inactive	
**Beta Mu**		Florida A&M University	Tallahassee, Florida	Active	
**Beta Nu**		Methodist University	Fayetteville, North Carolina	Active	
**Beta Xi**		Brenau University	Gainesville, Georgia	Active	
**Beta Omicron**		Louisiana State University	Baton Rouge, Louisiana	Active	
**Beta Pi**		University of Mary Billings Center	Billings, Montana	Active	
**Beta Pi**		University of Mary	Bismarck, North Dakota	Active	
**Beta Rho**		Spalding University	Louisville, Kentucky	Active	
**Beta Sigma**		North Central College	Naperville, Illinois	Active	
**Beta Tau**		University of Pittsburgh	Pittsburgh, Pennsylvania	Active	
**Beta Upsilon**		Belmont University	Nashville, Tennessee	Active	
**Beta Phi**		Ithaca College	Ithaca, New York	Active	
**Beta Chi**		Saint Francis University	Loretto, Pennsylvania	Active	
**Beta Psi**		Stony Brook University	Stony Brook, New York	Active	
**Beta Omega**		New York Institute of Technology	Old Westbury, New York	Active	
**Gamma Alpha**		Dominican University New York	Orangeburg, New York	Active	(Note: Chapter was established at the Dominican College of Blauvelt, which became Dominican University New York in 2022.)
Gamma Beta		West Virginia University	Morgantown, West Virginia	Inactive	
**Gamma Gamma**		California State University, Dominguez Hills	Carson, California	Active	
**Gamma Delta**		Gannon University Ruskin Campus	Ruskin, Florida	Active	
**Gamma Delta**		Gannon University	Erie, Pennsylvania	Active	
**Gamma Epsilon**		University of South Alabama	Mobile, Alabama	Active	
**Gamma Zeta**		University of Findlay	Findlay, Ohio	Active	
**Gamma Eta**		LIU Brooklyn	New York City, New York	Active	
**Gamma Theta**		Maryville University	St. Louis, Missouri	Active	
**Gamma Iota**		University of Central Arkansas	Conway, Arkansas	Active	
**Gamma Kappa**		Johnson & Wales University	Providence, Rhode Island	Active	
**Gamma Lambda**		University of Mississippi	University, Mississippi	Active	
**Gamma Mu**		San Jose State University	San Jose, California	Active	
**Gamma Nu**		Sacred Heart University	Fairfield, Connecticut	Active	
**Gamma Xi**		Widener University	Chester, Pennsylvania	Active	
**Gamma Omicron**		College of St. Scholastica	Duluth, Minnesota	Active	
**Gamma Pi**		Russell Sage College	Troy, New York	Active	
**Gamma Rho**		Alvernia University	Reading, Pennsylvania	Active	
Gamma Sigma				Inactive	
Gamma Tau				Inactive	
Gamma Upsilon				Inactive	
Gamma Phi				Inactive	
Gamma Chi				Inactive	
Gamma Psi				Inactive	
Gamma Omega				Inactive	
**Delta Alpha**		Dominican University of California	San Rafael, California	Active	
**Delta Beta**		East Carolina University	Greenville, North Carolina	Active	
**Delta Gamma**		College of Saint Mary	Omaha, Nebraska	Active	
Delta Delta				Inactive	
**Delta Epsilon**		Salem State University	Salem, Massachusetts	Active	
**Delta Zeta**		University of Tennessee Health Science Center	Memphis, Tennessee	Active	
**Delta Eta**		Seton Hall University	South Orange, New Jersey	Active	
**Delta Theta**		Grand Valley State University	Allendale, Michigan	Active	
**Delta Iota**		Saint Joseph's University	Philadelphia, Pennsylvania	Active	
**Delta Kappa**		University of St. Augustine for Health Sciences	St. Augustine, Florida	Active	
**Delta Kappa**		University of St. Augustine for Health Sciences Dallas Campus	Dallas, Texas	Active	
**Delta Kappa**		University of St. Augustine for Health Sciences Austin Campus	Austin, Texas	Active	
**Delta Lambda**		Towson University	Towson, Maryland	Active	
**Delta Mu**		Salus University	Elkins Park, Pennsylvania	Active	
**Delta Nu**		Concordia University Wisconsin	Mequon, Wisconsin	Active	
**Delta Xi**		Northern Arizona University	Flagstaff, Arizona	Active	
**Delta Omicron**		Rockhurst University	Kansas City, Missouri	Active	
**Delta Pi**		Adventhealth University	Orlando, Florida	Active	
**Delta Rho**		Indiana State University	Terre Haute, Indiana	Active	
**Delta Sigma**		Husson University	Bangor, Maine	Active	
**Delta Tau**		West Coast University	Los Angeles, California	Active	
**Delta Upsilon**		University of Missouri	Columbia, Missouri	Active	
**Delta Phi**		Huntington University	Huntington, Indiana	Active	
**Delta Chi**		Nazareth University	Rochester, New York	Active	
**Delta Psi**	2017	Stanbridge University	Alhambra, Irvine, and Riverside, California	Active	
**Delta Omega**		Abilene Christian University	Abilene, Texas	Active	
**Epsilon Alpha**		Florida Gulf Coast University	Fort Myers, Florida	Active	
**Epsilon Beta**		Mary Baldwin University	Staunton, Virginia	Active	
**Epsilon Gamma**		Rush University	Chicago, Illinois	Active	
**Epsilon Delta**		University of Minnesota	Minneapolis, Minnesota	Active	
Epsilon Epsilon				Inactive	
**Epsilon Zeta**		Mass General Brigham University of Health Professions	Boston, Massachusetts	Active	
**Epsilon Eta**		Nebraska Methodist College	Omaha, Nebraska	Active	
**Epsilon Theta**		Missouri State University	Springfield, Missouri	Active	
**Epsilon Iota**		Arkansas State University	Jonesboro, Arkansas	Active	
**Epsilon Kappa**	2018	Wesley College	Dover, Delaware	Active	(Note: College was purchased by Delaware State University in 2021 and is now the DSU Downtown campus.)
**Epsilon Lambda**		Drake University	Des Moines, Iowa	Active	
**Epsilon Mu**		New York University	New York City, New York	Active	
**Epsilon Nu**		Georgia State University	Atlanta, Georgia	Active	
**Epsilon Xi**		A.T. Still University	Kirksville, Missouri	Active	
**Epsilon Omicron**	2023	Slippery Rock University	Slippery Rock, Pennsylvania	Active	
**Epsilon Pi**		Clarkson University	Potsdam, New York	Active	
**Epsilon Rho**		Augusta University	Augusta, Georgia	Active	
**Epsilon Sigma**		York College, City University of New York	Jamaica, Queens, New York City, New York	Active	
**Epsilon Tau**		University of Michigan–Flint	Flint, Michigan	Active	
**Epsilon Upsilon**		Gwynedd Mercy University	Lower Gwynedd Township, Pennsylvania	Active	
**Epsilon Phi**		Thomas Jefferson University	Philadelphia, Pennsylvania	Active	
**Epsilon Chi**		University of North Dakota Casper campus	Casper, Wyoming	Active	
**Epsilon Psi**		Jacksonville University	Jacksonville, Florida	Active	
**Epsilon Omega**		Western New England University	Springfield, Massachusetts	Active	
**Zeta Alpha**		Lewis University	Romeoville, Illinois	Active	
**Zeta Beta**		Lenoir-Rhyne University	Hickory, North Carolina	Active	
**Zeta Gamma**		Pace University	Westchester, New York	Active	
**Eta Alpha**	2023	Presbyterian College	Clinton, South Carolina	Active	
**Eta Beta**	2023	Marquette University	Milwaukee, Wisconsin	Active	
		Barry University	Miami Shores, Florida	Inactive	
		California State University, Long Beach	Long Beach, California	Inactive	
		Governors State University	University Park, Illinois	Inactive	
		Loma Linda University	Loma Linda, California	Inactive	
		Mount Aloysius College	Cresson, Pennsylvania	Inactive	
		Samuel Merritt College	Oakland, California	Inactive	
		Shenandoah University	Winchester, Virginia	Inactive	
		University of Hartford	West Hartford, Connecticut	Inactive	
		University of Illinois at Chicago	Chicago, Illinois	Inactive	
		University of Indianapolis	Indianapolis, Indiana	Inactive	
		University of Puget Sound	Tacoma, Washington	Inactive	
		University of the Sciences in Philadelphia	Philadelphia, Pennsylvania	Inactive	(Note: The college merged into Saint Joseph's University on June 1, 2022.)
		Worcester State College	Worcester, Massachusetts	Inactive	
