= IADT Tampa =

Defunct for-profit college in Florida

Coordinates: 27.9922°N 82.5487°W

IADT - Tampa was a for-profit college offering both bachelor's and associate degrees in various fields of study. Former Sears executive Clem Stein founded the original International Academy of Design and Technology in Chicago in 1977. The Tampa location opened in 1984. IADT's parent company, Career Education Corporation, merged the school under the Sanford-Brown College name in March 2014 before closing the location a year later.

== Degrees ==
At IADT - Tampa, students could choose to earn either an associate or a bachelor's degree in four different areas of study: fashion design and marketing, interior design, graphic design, or digital production. Other bachelor's degrees offered included computer animation, audio production, fashion merchandising, and advertising design.

== Admissions ==
The requirements for admission to the academy included a personal interview, a high school diploma or equivalent, and the completion of an application, enrollment agreement, and financial aid forms. Financial aid is available for those who qualify.

== Campus ==
The new campus, located at 3725 Grace Street in incorporated South Tampa near suburban areas, is close to the I-275 on-ramp on Dale Mabry Highway. It has access to public transportation and is a few miles south of Raymond James Stadium and west of downtown Tampa. This campus is new for IADT, and a full list of amenities is not yet available. The Orlando Culinary Academy is a branch campus located in Orlando.

== Accreditation ==
The International Academy of Design & Technology is accredited by the Accrediting Council for Independent Colleges and Schools to award associate and bachelor's degrees. The academy's Bachelor of Fine Arts degree in interior design is accredited by the Council for Interior Design Accreditation.

== Controversy ==
The International Academy of Design & Technology is the subject of a class action lawsuit filed by its students, who are suing for deceptive and unfair practices.

== Maps ==
Map to the International Academy of Design & Technology-Tampa
