= IADT =

IADT may refer to:

- International Academy of Design and Technology – a private, for-profit media arts college, several of which are located in Canada and the United States
- Dún Laoghaire Institute of Art, Design and Technology – a specialised, public-funded college within the technological sector in Ireland, located in Dún Laoghaire, Dublin and incorporating the National Film School
