= Penn State Berks-Lehigh Valley =

Penn State Berks-Lehigh Valley may refer to:

- Penn State Berks, a commonwealth campus of Pennsylvania State University located in Berks County, PA
- Penn State Lehigh Valley, a commonwealth campus of Pennsylvania State University located in Fogelsville, PA
