= Orlando Culinary Academy =

Hospitality school in Orlando, Florida

Coordinates: 28.4404°N 81.4298°W

- Type: For-profit college
- Active: 2002–2017
- Affiliations: IADT Tampa, International Academy of Design and Technology
- Location: Orlando, Florida, USA
- Website: Orlando Culinary Academy

The Orlando Culinary Academy (OCA) was a culinary and hospitality training school and an affiliate of Le Cordon Bleu Schools North America. The Academy was established in January 2002 and was located in Orlando, Florida. OCA is a branch campus of the International Academy of Design and Technology's Tampa division. In July 2007, the Orlando Culinary Academy was named College of the Year by the Florida Association of Postsecondary Schools and Colleges Conference. All US Le Cordon Bleu College locations closed in 2017.

== Programs ==
Orlando Culinary Academy offered two degree programs for study. An Associate in Science Degree available in Le Cordon Bleu Culinary Arts, and Le Cordon Bleu Pâtisserie & Baking. All of the degree programs were designed to be fifteen to twenty-one months in length with an externship during the final three months of the programs.

== Admissions ==
The requirements for admission into OCA were a personal interview, high school diploma or equivalent and completion of an application, enrollment agreement and financial aid forms.

== Campus ==
Orlando Culinary Academy occupied 80,000 square feet (7,400 m^{2}) a freestanding facility at 8511 Commodity Circle in Orlando Central Park, an office-industrial park in south Orlando. The facilities included professional kitchens, lecture classrooms and an Academy library with the administrative office in the building.

== Accreditation ==
Orlando Culinary Academy is accredited by the Accrediting Council for Independent Colleges and Schools (ACICS) to award diplomas and associate degrees. OCA is also accredited by the American Culinary Federation Foundation, Inc. Accrediting Commission.

== Institutional Affiliations ==
Orlando Culinary Academy is affiliated with the following organizations:

- Career College Association (CCA)
- Florida Association of Post-Secondary Schools and Colleges (FAPSC)
- Florida Restaurant Association (FRA)
- Florida Restaurant and Lodging Association (FRLA)
- American Culinary Federation (ACF)

== Notable faculty ==
Chef Instructor Tyler Brassil was named one of the Top Ten Best Sous Chefs in America by Bertoli Olive Oil and Food & Wine Magazine in the first sous chef awards. In 2000, he opened the Empire restaurant and worked alongside future Food & Wine Best New Chef 2000, Loren Falsone.
