= Southern California University =

Southern California University may refer to:

- California Southern University, a correspondence school founded in 1978 as the "Southern California University for Professional Studies"
- University of Southern California, founded in 1880
