= Sussanne Khan =

Indian fashion and interior designer (born 1975)

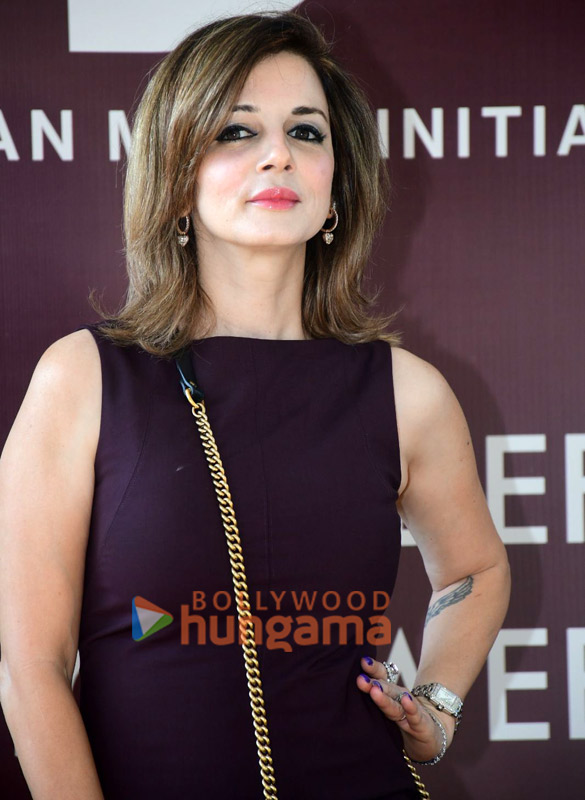
- Khan in 2025
- Born: 26 October 1975 (age 51); Bombay, Maharashtra, India
- Other names: Sussanne Roshan; Suzzy
- Education: Brooks College
- Occupations: Fashion designer; interior designer
- Spouse: Hrithik Roshan (m. 2000; div. 2014)
- Partner: Arslan Goni (2022–present)
- Children: 2
- Parents: Sanjay Khan (father); Zarine Khan (died 7 November 2025) (mother)
- Relatives: Zayed Khan (brother); Feroz Khan (uncle); Akbar Khan (uncle); Fardeen Khan (cousin)

Sussanne Khan (born 26 October 1975) is an Indian interior and fashion designer. She was previously married to actor Hrithik Roshan, with whom she has two sons.

== Early life ==
Sussanne Khan was born to Sanjay Khan and Zarine Katrak Khan on 26 October 1975, in Bombay, as the third child in their family. Her father, Sanjay, who was a prominent actor in the 1980s and her mother, Zarine Katrak was also an actress as well as an interior designer. Her father is of mixed Afghan and Iranian descent while her mother came from a Parsi family.

Her younger brother, Zayed Khan is also an actor who works in Bollywood. Her elder sister, Farah Khan Ali, is a jewelry designer and Sussanne's second sister, Simone Khan, is an interior designer.

She is the niece of actor Feroz Khan and director Akbar Khan (brothers of Sanjay Khan) and first cousin of Bollywood actor, Fardeen Khan.

== Career ==
After obtaining an Associate of Arts degree in interior designing in 1995 from Brooks College, USA, Khan started her career as an interior designer in 1996 by following the footsteps of her mother who was also a well-known interior designer during her active career.

In 2011, she partnered with fellow interior designer and a well recognised film producer, Gauri Khan, to launch and introduce The Charcoal Project foundation in Mumbai, which is the first interior fashion design store in India. The Charcoal Project is also considered as the most popular design store in India.

She worked for The Label Life, an e-commerce fashion lifestyle company established in 2012. She was employed as the first interior fashion designer for the company. In 2014, she launched the official branch of Pearl Academy campus in Mumbai and supporting the students of the academy by handling scholarships.

In March 2026, Khan partnered with producer Ekta Kapoor to launch Ekatra Jewels, joining the board of Ekatra Retail Ventures as its design director. In this role, she co-designed and launched the brand's flagship lab-grown diamond collection, named "Shristi Ratna," featuring a proprietary 108-facet diamond cut. She also designed and introduced "Oh My Gold," a lightweight, hollow-construction gold jewellery collection for the brand.

== Personal life ==
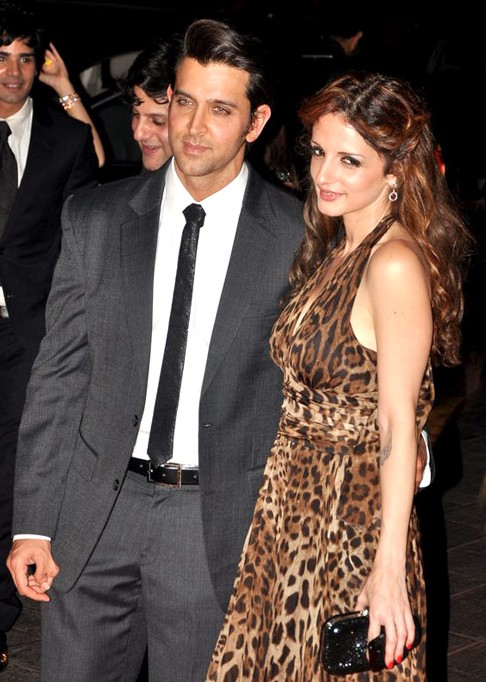
Khan with then-husband Hrithik Roshan in 2012

Khan married Hrithik Roshan in 2000 after dating for four years. The couple ended their 13-year-old relationship in 2013 and divorced a year later, after having two sons. However, they still remain close friends and spent the lockdown during 2020 together with their sons. She was involved in the Dragon fly club raid in December 2020. In May 2022, Khan shared a photo with boyfriend Arslan Goni, confirming their relationship.
