= Damian Jim =

Navajo artist

- Born: 1973 (age 52–53); Shiprock, New Mexico
- Education: Al Collins Graphic Design School
- Website: damianjim.com

Damian Jim (born 1973) is a Diné (Navajo) artist. He is known for his design work on traditional woven baskets, in addition to digital art, photography, and work with acrylic, oil, and ink.

== Early life and education ==
Damin Jim was born in 1973 in Shiprock, New Mexico on the Navajo Nation.

Jim received training in graphic design from the Al Collins Graphic Design School. He also has a bachelor's degree in Computer Information Systems.

== Art career ==
Jim is well known for his work as a basket design. He began this work by sketching symbols from Navajo oral history, editing the image with a computer, and discussing the design with weavers for their input. His first job was with the Twin Rocks Trading Post in Utah, where his designs were used by leading Navajo weavers and helped sustain Navajo basketry. His designs were also used by rug weavers and jewelers.

In addition to this work, he uses pop culture references, surrealism, and street art aesthetics, incorporating retellings of Indigenous stories, in work with acrylic, oil, and ink on canvas and paper.

He co-founded and managed 1Spot, one of the few Native Americans in the United States-led art galleries in Phoenix, Arizona.

== Publishing ==
Damian Jim helped create Ziindi: Indigenous Art Zine in 2012.

== Awards ==
- Best Artist of the Year, Flagstaff, AZ (1992)
- People's Choice, Sedona Fine Arts Festival (1992)
- First Place, Edge of the Cedars State Park Museum Exhibition (1998)
- First Place, 2D/Prints and Honorable Mention, 2D/Mixed Medium, Heard Museum Guild Indian Fair & Market (2021)
