= Penn State Lehigh Valley =

Public college in Center Valley, Pennsylvania, U.S.

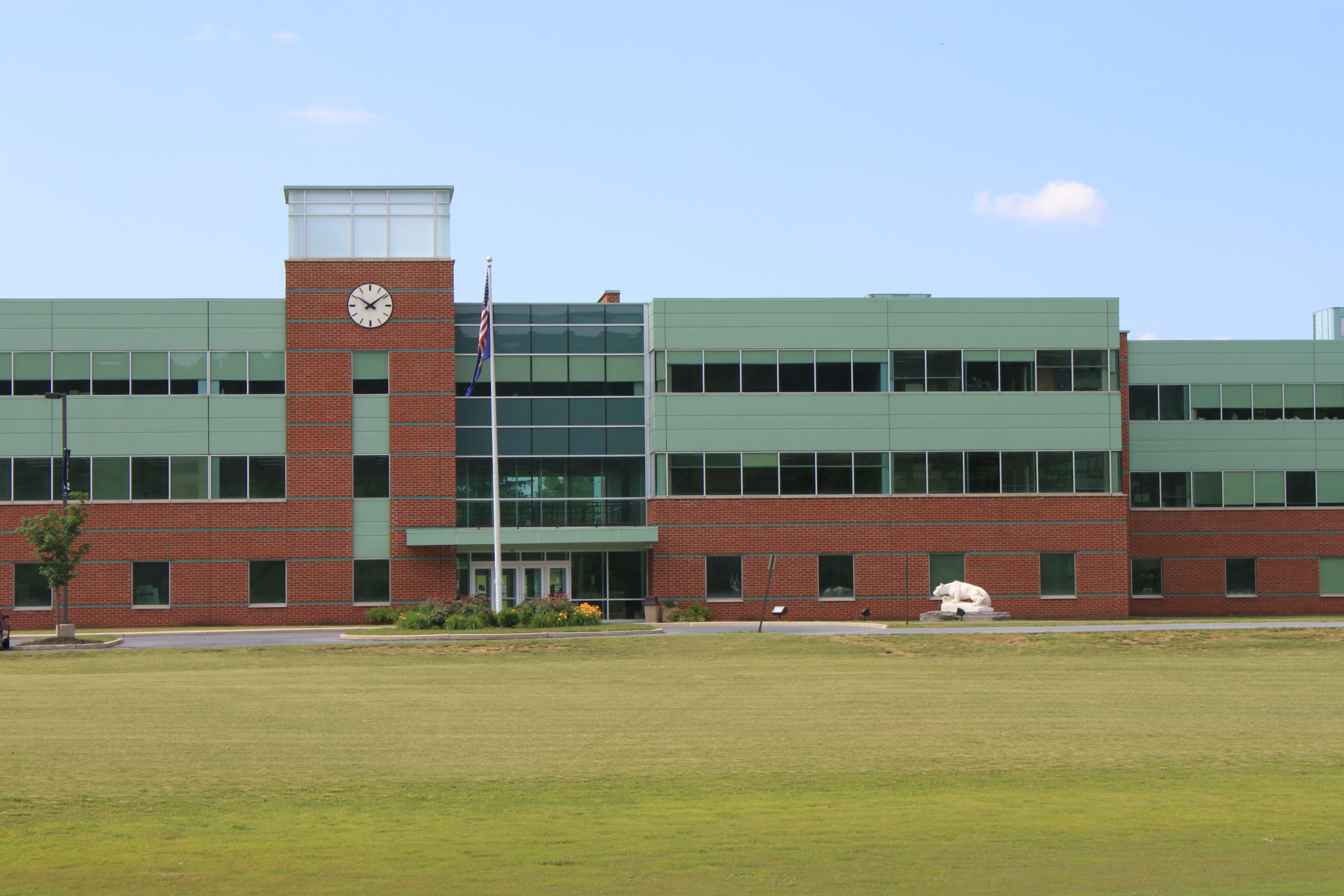
- Penn State Lehigh Valley campus in Center Valley, Pennsylvania in June 2010
- Type: Public satellite campus
- Established: 1912
- Parent institution: Pennsylvania State University
- Affiliations: PSUAC (USCAA)
- Chancellor: Dr. Tina Richardson
- President: Neeli Bendapudi
- Students: 899 (Fall 2025)
- Undergraduates: 898 (Fall 2025)
- Postgraduates: 1 (Fall 2025)
- Location: Center Valley, Pennsylvania, U.S. 40°33′32″N 75°24′09″W
- Campus: Suburban 40 acres
- Colors: Dark Blue and White
- Nickname: Nittany Lions
- Website: lehighvalley.psu.edu/

Penn State Lehigh Valley is a commonwealth campus of Pennsylvania State University located in Center Valley, outside of Allentown in the Lehigh Valley region of Pennsylvania.

== History ==
In 1912, Penn State opened its first permanent branch school in the attic of an elementary school in Allentown, Pennsylvania. Designed to provide professional training to employees, the Allentown Branch School offered evening courses in engineering. Over the next few decades additional programs were added, including three-year evening programs in engineering, technology, and business administration, as well as continuation school offered one day a week for workers in silk mills and other local factories. Eventually the evening programs were compressed into a one-year daytime program designed to meet the needs of returning World War II veterans.

By 1951, the curriculum had expanded to include associate degrees in electrical engineering and mechanical engineering technology, business programs, and graduate credit classes for teachers. The university purchased a converted factory building at 725 Ridge Avenue in Allentown to house its Allentown Center.

In the 1970s, the Allentown Campus grew rapidly and moved first to larger quarters in the Fogelsville School Building, and then, in 1977, to its campus in Fogelsville, which was built on a 40-acre (160,000 m^{2}) tract of land donated by Mohr Orchards. Along with the new facilities came a new mission to provide the first two-year Penn State baccalaureate degrees and expanded continuing education programs.

The 1990s brought considerable change and subsequent growth to the campus. Changing its name to Penn State Lehigh Valley to better reflect the community it serves, the campus became part of a college within the university composed of Penn State Lehigh Valley and Penn State Berks. The two campus college was designated Penn State Berks-Lehigh Valley College. Together the campuses shared faculty and developed four-year baccalaureate degree programs in several disciplines.

With the addition of four-year baccalaureate degree programs, enrollment increased. In 2003, Penn State Lehigh Valley opened a second site, the Corporate Learning Center, located at 100 Brodhead Road in Bethlehem. The Bethlehem site currently houses continuing education programs and elementary education degree program classes. In 2005, the university restructured across the state and discontinued the Berks-Lehigh Valley College partnership.

Currently, approximately 900 undergraduate students attend Penn State Lehigh Valley. An additional 3,000 students participate each year in its continuing education programs.

On March 20, 2009, the Penn State University board approved the purchase of the facility owned by Lehigh Valley College in Center Valley. Classes moved to Center Valley in September 2009. Penn State shared the facility with Lehigh Valley College until that school closed in December 2009. The new facility more than doubled the size of the building on the old campus. With the increased space at the Center Valley campus, programs at the Corporate Learning Center were moved to Center Valley and the Corporate Learning programs were closed at the end of 2010.

== Athletics ==
Undergraduate demographics as of Fall 2023
Race and ethnicity	Total
White	51%
Hispanic	22%
Asian	12%
Black	8%
Two or more races	4%
Unknown	2%
International student	1%
Economic diversity
Low-income (Note: The percentage of students who received an income-based federal Pell grant intended for low-income students.)	37%
Affluent (Note: The percentage of students who are a part of the American middle class at the bare minimum.)	63%

Penn State–Lehigh Valley teams participate in the United States Collegiate Athletic Association (USCAA). The Nittany Lions are a member of the Pennsylvania State University Athletic Conference (PSUAC). Men's sports include basketball, cross country, golf, and soccer. Women's sports include basketball, cross country, soccer, and volleyball.
