= Missouri College =

Defunct for-profit college

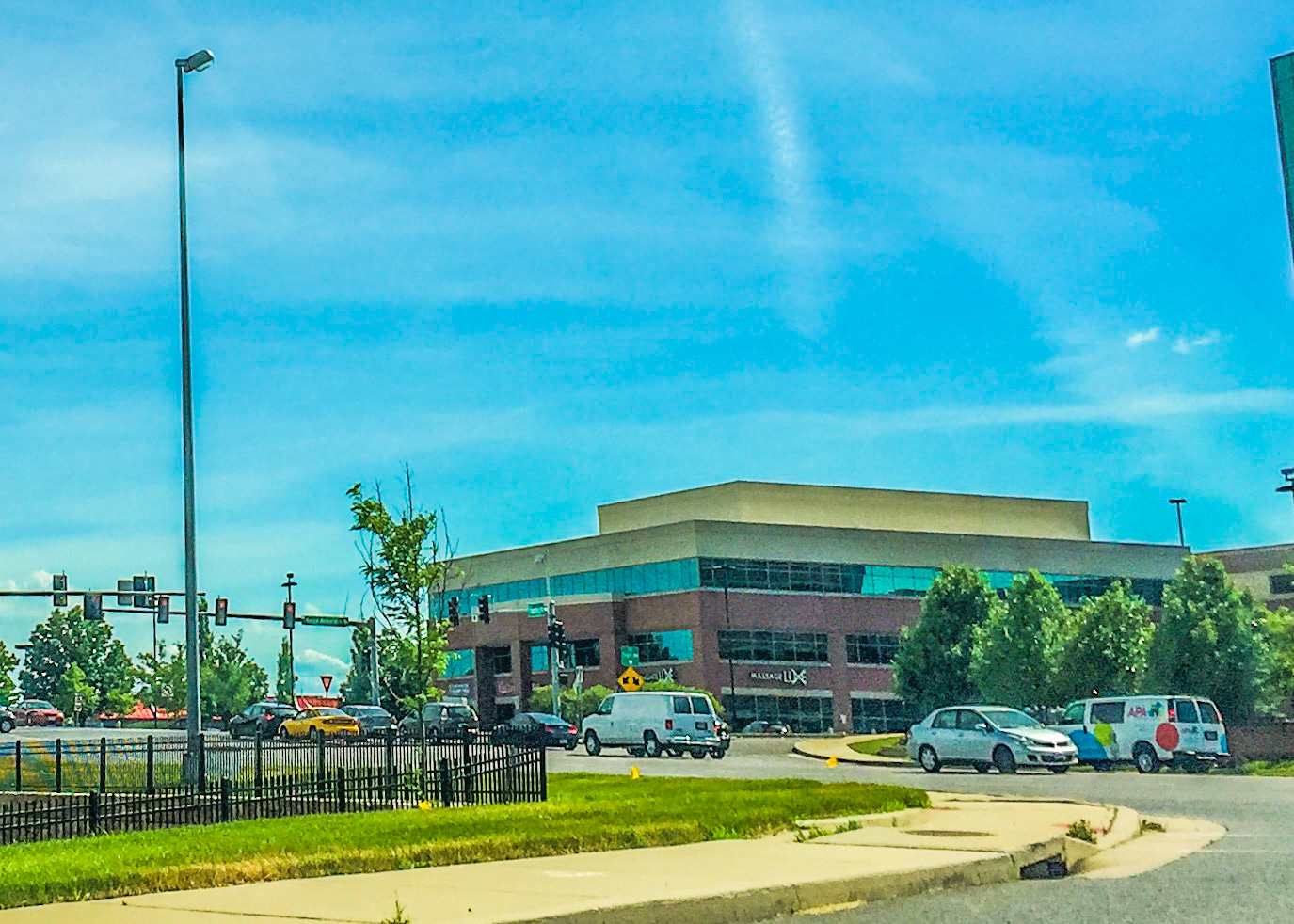
- Former Missouri College building, 1405 S Hanley Rd, Brentwood, MO in June 2018
- Type: For-profit college
- Active: 1963–2016
- Location: Brentwood, Missouri, United States; 38°37′38″N 90°20′08″W
- Website: Missouri College

Missouri College was a for-profit college in St. Louis County, Missouri. Founded in 1963, the school was accredited by the Accrediting Council for Independent Colleges and Schools. Missouri College offered bachelor's degrees in Healthcare Management and specialized associate degrees in Business Administration, Dental Hygiene, Allied Health, and Occupational Therapy Assisting. Massage Therapy was one of the several diploma programs offered in the college catalog.

Missouri College was a subsidiary of Weston Educational Inc.

== History ==
Missouri College was founded by Dr. S.L. Gilberg, D.D.S., in 1963. It was originally named the Missouri School for Doctors' Assistants in Clayton, Missouri. Gilberg was the executive director until 1966. The school introduced a Dental Assistant program in 1969. A year later, the college was accredited by the Accrediting Commission of Career Schools and Colleges of Technology. In 1989, Missouri School added a Computer Office Assistant program to its new business division. The school moved to Manchester Road in 1991.

In 1993, the school was approved for degree-granting status by the Accrediting Commission of Career Colleges and Colleges to offer Associate of Occupational Studies degree programs in both health and business career fields. This expansion into business courses prompted the school to change its name from Missouri School for Doctors' Assistants to Missouri College in July 1995.

The college expanded its curriculum in 1999 when it added a Massage Therapy Program and again in 2000 with the introduction of an Information Technology Program.

In September 2002, Career Education Corporation acquired Missouri College. Shortly after this purchase, Missouri College became approved as a bachelor's degree-granting institution. In 2008, Missouri College began offering online classes developed through the Missouri College Flexible Learning Model. In January 2009, Missouri College moved into a new facility on South Hanley Road, Brentwood, Missouri.

In September 2015, Career Education Corporation transferred ownership of Missouri College to Weston Educational Inc. (WEI). This transition allows the college to join a group of colleges focused on Health Career Programs. It was closed on November 1, 2016, due to financial difficulties.

== Academics ==
Missouri College offered diploma, associate and bachelor's degree programs, with an emphasis on current healthcare technology and business practices in the greater St. Louis area.

=== Accreditation ===
Missouri College was accredited by the Accrediting Council for Independent Colleges and Schools to award certificates and associate and bachelor's degrees. The college's Dental Hygiene and Dental Assistant programs were accredited by the Commission on Dental Accreditation of the American Dental Association (CODA) and was granted the accreditation status of approval without reporting. Missouri College was certified to operate by the Missouri Department of Higher Education.

== Campus ==
The campus of Missouri College in Brentwood, Missouri, consisted of one building on the side of a parking garage. The campus was located near the Brentwood Metro Station off of Hanley Rd. Missouri College started its beginnings in a different part of town, but with its expanding growth it moved to its current location.
