= Collins College (Arizona) =

Former for-profit college in Phoenix, Arizona

- Former name: Al Collins Graphic Design School (1978-2001)
- Type: For-profit
- Active: 1978; 48 years ago – 2012; 14 years ago
- Parent institution: Career Education Corporation
- Location: Phoenix (2009-2012), Arizona, United States
- Website: www.collinscollege.edu

Collins College was a for-profit college with an emphasis in the fields of visual arts and design. Owned by Career Education Corporation, Collins College had two campuses. The main campus was located in Tempe, before moving to southeast Phoenix in 2009. A smaller branch campus was located in west Phoenix from 2003 until circa 2012.

The school announced in December 2012 that it was shutting down and began a teach-out policy for existing students.

== History ==
=== Al Collins Graphic Design School ===
Al and Florence Collins founded Al Collins Graphic Design School in 1978.

The school opened to a small group of students. Starting with a small evening program, in the early 1980s day classes were later added and larger facilities were obtained. In 1982, the school became accredited by the National Association of Trade and Technical Schools (NATTS). In 1985 the school moved to a larger campus in Tempe due to continued growth in its student population. The following year, a Computer Graphics program was added.

In 1987 the Arizona State Board for Private Post-secondary Education and NATTS granted the school the approval to offer an Associate of Arts (AA) degree in Graphic Design and in 1991, the Bachelor of Arts degree in Graphic Design. In 1997, programs in Multimedia Production and Digital Video Production were included, in addition to the Computer Graphics program. In 1998, the Associate of Occupational Studies degree in Animation was added.

Al Collins sold the school shortly after moving to the Tempe location. The name was changed to Collins College during the Spring semester, 2001.

==== Department of Education scrutiny ====
The United States Department of Education conducted a 2003 Program Review of Collins College and found several serious problems with the school's administration of federal financial aid programs including: "many students failed to meet the attendance threshold...[and that the College's] practice of not considering failed courses as part of the [cumulative GPA] at the time that students fail the course...may...be falsely permitting those students to remain eligible for Title IV disbursements" and "Collins College had used "a coordinated subterfuge to under-report the effect" of federal financial aid dollars disbursed in order to show compliance with the so-called 90/10 Rule."

The issues with Collins College were a major contributing factor to the Department of Education's 2005 decision to prohibit its parent company, Career Education Corporation from expanding, a prohibition that was lifted in 2007.

=== Decline, move and closing ===
Between 2008 and 2009 the school dropped many degree programs and classes. The discontinued programs include the Associate of Science in Personal Computing/Network Technology, and the certificate programs of Interior Design, and Animation.

In January 2009 the majority of the main campus in Tempe was moved to a new location nearby in southeast Phoenix in the Cotton Center.

On December 3, 2012, Collins College closed down student applications and initiated a teach-out closing policy.

=== Alumni ===
Notable alumni include Navajo artist Damian Jim.

=== Lawsuit ===
Collins College was one of 153 schools detailed in the Sweet v. Cardona Settlement.

On June 22, 2022, the U.S. Department of Education (ED) and the plaintiffs reached a settlement in the case titled Sweet v. Cardona (formerly Sweet v DeVos). The court granted final approval to the settlement as fair, adequate, and reasonable on Nov. 16, 2022. The agreement affects the processing of borrower defense applications filed on or before Nov. 15, 2022. Borrowers whose applications for borrower defense discharges were pending as of June 22, 2022, are “Class Members,” while those whose applications were submitted in the period from June 23 to Nov. 15, 2022, are “Post-Class Applicants.”
