= University of St. Augustine for Health Sciences =

Education organization in the United States

Coordinates: 29°51′49″N 81°18′53″W

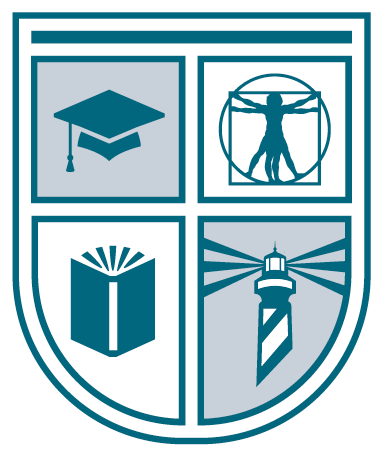
- Type: Private for-profit health sciences university
- Established: 1979
- Founders: Stanley V. Paris
- Chancellor: Vivian A. Sanchez
- Vice-Chancellor: Melanie Storms
- Students: 3,780
- Location: San Marcos, California(HQ), Miami, Florida, St. Augustine, Florida, Austin, Texas, and Dallas, Texas, United States
- Website: www.usa.edu
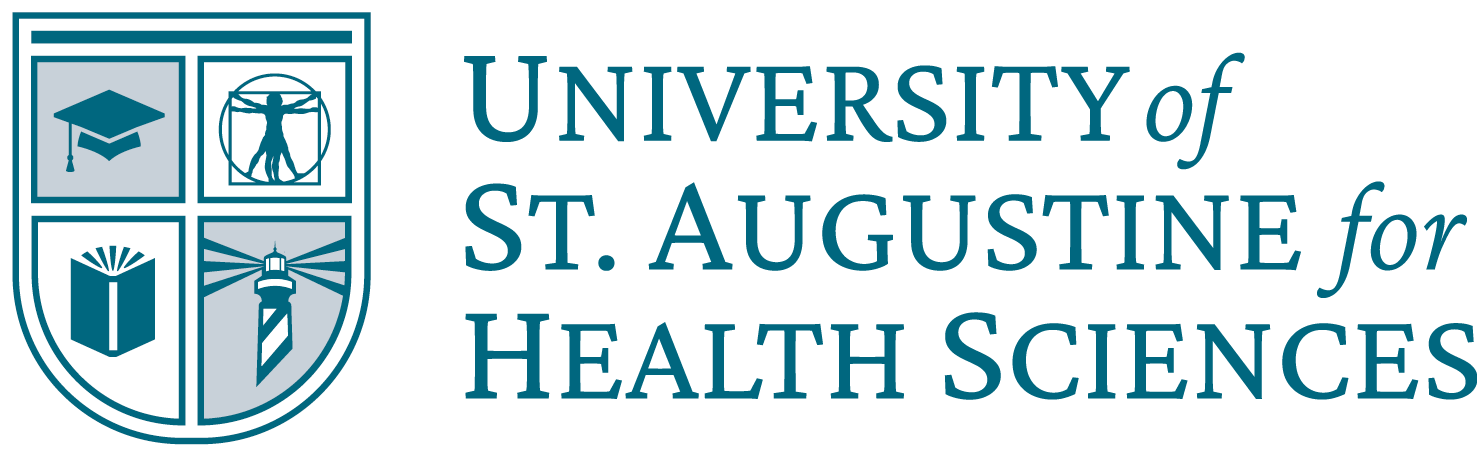

The University of St. Augustine for Health Sciences (USAHS) is a private for-profit health sciences university headquartered in San Marcos, California, United States. It was founded in 1979 as the Institute of Physical Therapy. It has campuses in San Marcos, California and in St. Augustine, Florida; Miami, Florida; Austin, Texas; and Dallas, Texas. The university is now owned by Perdoceo Education Corporation.

== History ==
The school that ultimately became the University of St. Augustine for Health Sciences was founded in Atlanta, Georgia, in 1979 by Stanley V. Paris as the Institute of Physical Therapy. Paris retired from USAHS in 2007.

In 1997, the school officially became "The University of St. Augustine for Health Sciences." It purchased a small private hospital and an adjoining 26 acres of land at the Flagler Health Park Campus in St. Augustine, creating its current St. Augustine campus.

In 2007, USAHS expanded to California, opening a campus in San Diego. The university also completed work on a 98,000-square-foot academic and clinic building at the St. Augustine campus. Two years later, the San Diego campus moved to San Marcos, California.

In 2012, the university opened its third campus, a new location in Austin, Texas. The following year, Laureate International Universities acquired a majority interest in USAHS. Three years later, it opened a campus in Miami, Florida.

Altas Partners, a Canadian long-term private equity firm, purchased USAHS from Laureate in 2019. Shortly thereafter, USAHS opened its fifth location in Dallas, Texas.

On December 2, 2024, Perdoceo Education Corporation paid a cash consideration of approximately $138M (net of cash acquired) at closing to acquire 100% ownership of the University of St. Augustine for Health Sciences.

== Academics ==
USAHS is accredited by the WASC Senior College and University Commission.

== Notable alumni ==
- Sarah Levy (born 1995), Olympic bronze medalist, rugby union and rugby sevens player
