= Lehigh Valley College =

Former for-profit college in Center Valley, Pennsylvania

Coordinates: 40.5592°N 75.4027°W

- Active: 1869–2009
- Founder: Career Education Corporation
- Location: Center Valley, Pennsylvania, U.S.

Lehigh Valley College was a college owned by Career Education Corporation, a for-profit educational company. The college was located near Allentown, Pennsylvania, in Center Valley and offered associate degree programs in a variety of vocational areas, including criminal justice, graphic design and accounting.

== History ==
Lehigh Valley College, formerly known as Allentown Business School, was founded in 1869 as primarily a secretarial school. Since opening, it expanded and moved four times to accommodate a larger student body and greater selection of programs. The school operated under at least five owners. Career Education Corporation bought it in 1995 and added programs, doubled enrollment and raised tuition.

In July 2003 it moved to a 30-acre (120,000 m^{2}) campus in Center Valley, Pennsylvania with 97,000 square feet (9,000 m^{2}) of facility space which included 40 classrooms, 2 art studios, a photo/video studio, 4 Mac labs, 5 PC labs, library, and wireless internet.

In November 2006, Career Education Corporation announced plans to sell several of its schools including Lehigh Valley College.

On March 20, 2009, the Board of Trustees of Penn State University approved the purchase of the property for $12 million. The purchase did not affect a state attorney general probe into the Lehigh Valley College school.

== Programs ==
Similar to other CEC owned institutions, Lehigh Valley College offered associate degree programs in Criminal Justice; Fashion Merchandising; Graphic Design; Health Information Technology; Internet Technologies; Management/Marketing; Massage Therapy; Medical Assisting; Network Support; and Visual Communications. No new students were accepted after February, 2008, although students enrolled at that time were allowed to complete their programs.

== Controversy ==
The Pennsylvania Attorney General's Office demanded records from the school covering its financial aid policies, recruitment practices and student complaints in July 2005 in connection with a probe of the school by its consumer protection division.

In August 2005, the Allentown Morning Call newspaper published the results of its investigation of Lehigh Valley College, which cited several alleged issues with the school including misleading and aggressive admission tactics, comparably high tuition costs, minimal transferability of credits, deceptive job placement statistics, inadequate job placement assistance, and weak quality of instruction.

In 2008, Lehigh Valley College reached a settlement with then-Pennsylvania Attorney General Tom Corbett for $200,000. This followed a 2-year investigation into the school's practices and communications related to student loans, job placement and the ability to transfer credits.
