= Colorado Technical University =

For-profit university in Colorado Springs, Colorado, US

- Former name: Colorado Technical College (1965–1995)
- Motto: Integrity At CTU
- Type: Private for-profit university
- Established: 1965; 61 years ago
- Founder: Robert Turkisher
- Accreditation: Higher Learning Commission
- President: Elise Baskel
- Provost: Kathleen Schnier
- Academic staff: 52 Full-time, 1,095 Part-time
- Students: 28,852 (fall 2023)
- Undergraduates: 26,114 (fall 2023)
- Postgraduates: 2,738 (fall 2023)
- Location: Colorado Springs, Colorado, United States; 38°53′37.9″N 104°50′2.7″W
- Campus: Urban, Online
- Colors: Red and white
- Mascot: The Golden Eagle
- Website: www.coloradotech.edu

Colorado Technical University (Colorado Tech or CTU) is a private, for-profit university with its main campus in Colorado Springs, Colorado, United States. Founded in 1965, CTU offers undergraduate, graduate, and doctoral degrees, primarily in business, management, and technology. About 92% of Colorado Tech's students are fully online. According to Colorado Tech, the university has conferred more than 158,000 degrees worldwide. Colorado Tech has no public or official affiliation with the state of Colorado and is owned by the for-profit company Perdoceo Education Corporation, publicly traded on the Nasdaq under PRDO and formerly known as Career Education Corporation.

== History ==
The school was established as Colorado Technical College in 1965, focusing on training former military personnel in technical and vocational subjects. Air Force Lieutenant Colonel Robert (Bob) Turkisher, a flight engineer, founded the institution and served as its first president. To support his efforts, Turkisher brought in Air Force Colonel Richard Davis to be the Human Resources Director at CTU. Davis had experience in the Human Resources field after serving as a pilot, which allowed Turkisher to focus on developing the school’s programs and securing accreditation. In 1995, the institution gained university status and changed its name to Colorado Technical University (CTU).

In 2008, CTU teamed up with the nonprofit Yellow Ribbon Fund to create the annual CTU Patriot Scholarship (formerly the Wounded Warrior Scholarship), which awards 25 wounded service members and veterans, as well as 25 spouses of wounded service members, with scholarships. The scholarship covers the full cost of tuition toward any CTU degree, including course materials, fees, and a new laptop computer. As of 2023, CTU has awarded 900 scholarships totaling over $23 million.

in 2018, CTU was recognized as a Purple Heart University by the Military Order of the Purple Heart.

=== Lawsuits, investigations, and financial problems ===
In 2017, Colorado Tech was under heightened cash monitoring by the US Department of Education to provide additional oversight of cash management.

On March 9, 2020, the Department of Veterans Affairs suspended G.I. Bill reimbursement eligibility for Colorado Technical University and several other for-profit schools due to what the V.A. said were "erroneous, deceptive, or misleading enrollment and advertising practices", giving the schools 60 days to take "corrective action". The VA withdrew its threat of sanctions in July 2020.

== Funding ==
In 2017, the Center for Investigative Reporting reported that CTU received approximately 95% of all of its funds from the US government, including about $3 million from the Department of Defense and $33 million from GI Bill funds.

== Campuses ==
The university maintains Colorado campuses in Colorado Springs (main campus). Additionally, a number of its degree programs can be completed entirely or largely online. CTU previously had campuses in Aurora, Kansas City, Pueblo, and Sioux Falls, all of which have permanently closed down.

== Academics ==
Colorado Tech's President is Elise Baskel, who was an executive with Perdoceo Education for 13 years. Colorado Technical University offers accredited degree programs in business, engineering, and applied scientific disciplines, including Accounting, Business Administration, Computer Science, Criminal Justice, Engineering, Nursing, Finance, Health Sciences, Information Systems and Technology, Management, and Public Administration.

=== Faculty ===
As of 2021, Colorado Tech employed 52 full-time and 1095 part-time instructors.

=== Schools and colleges ===
CTU has the following areas of study:

- College of Business & Management
- College of Engineering & Computer Science
- College of Health Sciences
- College of Information Systems & Technology
- College of Security Studies
- College of Project Management
- College of Nursing

=== Rankings ===
In 2026, CTU was ranked among the Best Online Bachelor’s Programs (for the 12th consecutive year) and Best Online Bachelor’s Programs for Veterans (for the 12th consecutive year) by U.S. News & World Report. U.S. News & World Report also named CTU among the Best Online Master's in Criminal Justice Programs (12th consecutive year), Best Online Master's in Computer Information Technology Programs (12th consecutive year), Best Online MBA Programs (11th consecutive year), Best Online Master's in Business Programs (11th consecutive year), Best Online Master's in Nursing Programs (8th consecutive year), and Best Online Bachelor's in Business Programs (6th consecutive year).

In 2025, CTU was ranked among the Best for Vets: Colleges by Military Times, marking the 8th year Colorado Tech appeared on this list.

In 2025, CEO Magazine ranked CTU’s MBA Program #57 across its Global MBA Programs Rankings list, marking the 5th time CTU appeared on this list.

In 2019, Colorado Technical University was ranked 476th out of 500 Masters schools by Washington Monthly. In 2023, CTU was also tied for 160th on the U.S. News & World Report lists for Best Online Programs. US News ranked CTU tied for 90th for online bachelor's programs for veterans in 2022.

== Accreditation, associations, and affiliations ==
The university is accredited by the Higher Learning Commission. The Bachelor of Science in Computer Engineering and the Bachelor of Science in Electrical Engineering at the Colorado Springs campus are accredited by the Engineering Accreditation Commission of ABET. The business degree programs offered by Colorado Technical University are ACBSP accredited.

The nursing degrees and certificate programs are accredited by Commission on Collegiate Nursing Education (CCNE). The following degree programs at CTU are accredited by the PMI Global Accreditation Center for Project Management Education Programs (GAC):

- Bachelor of Science in Business Administration with a concentration in Project Management
- Bachelor of Science in Project Management
- Master of Business Administration with a concentration in Project Management
- Master of Science in Management with a concentration in Information Systems Security
- Master of Science in Management with a concentration in Information Technology/Project Management
- Master of Science in Management with a concentration in Project Management

The university is a subsidiary of Perdoceo, formerly Career Education Corporation. The National Security Agency and the Department of Homeland Security recognized CTU as a Center of Academic Excellence in Information Assurance Education.

=== Student outcomes ===
According to the National Center for Education Statistics, Colorado Tech's online graduation rate is 23%.

According to the College Scorecard, Colorado Tech has a 25 percent graduation rate. Salary after completing ranged from $24,012 (AA in Health and Medical Administrative Services) to $74,576 (Bachelor's in Computer/IT). For student debtors in repayment, 32 percent were in forbearance, 25 percent were not making progress, 18 percent defaulted, 10 percent were in deferment, 7 percent were delinquent, 5 percent were making progress, 2 percent were discharged, and 1 percent were paid in full.

== Corporate partnerships ==
CTU has been an educational provider for McDonald's since 2014.

== Notable alumni ==
- Jason Gray, government official; former acting administrator of the United States Agency for International Development (January 20, 2025 – February 3, 2025)
