= American InterContinental University =

For-profit university based in Schaumburg, Illinois, US

- Motto: The Serious U
- Type: Private for-profit university
- Established: 1970
- Accreditation: HLC
- President: Sunitha Araamudhu
- Faculty: 74 full-time, 716 part-time
- Students: 11,277 (fall 2024)
- Undergraduates: 7,186 (fall 2024)
- Postgraduates: 4,091 (fall 2024)
- Location: 2200 East Germann Road, Suite 100, Chandler, Arizona, 85286, United States
- Website: www.aius.education

American InterContinental University (AIU) is a private for-profit university with its headquarters in Chandler, Arizona. It employs open admissions. American InterContinental University is a member of the American InterContinental University System. The System is accredited by the Higher Learning Commission. The university awards associate, bachelor's, and master's degrees. The System is owned by the for-profit company Perdoceo Education Corporation, publicly traded on the NASDAQ under PRDO and formerly known as Career Education Corporation (CEC).

== History ==
American InterContinental University (AIU) was founded in 1970 in Lucerne, Switzerland, by American couple Jack and Helen Barnette of Atlanta, and was first known as the American Fashion College of Switzerland. The school was recognized as an American degree awarding institution in 1971, initially offering associate and bachelor's degrees starting in 1974. In 1976, the Switzerland-based school opened a campus in Atlanta (the American College for the Applied Arts) and, in 1978, the Lucerne campus moved to London and changed its name to the American College in London.

By 1978, the school had approximately 300 students, and began to expand its course offering beyond fashion to areas such as commercial art, interior design, and business. The school opened several other campuses in subsequent years. Steve Bostic bought the school in 1996 and changed its name to American InterContinental University. In 2001, AIU was acquired by its current owner, Career Education Corporation, which is a publicly traded operator of for-profit schools.

Branch campuses were founded as follows:

- Atlanta – Buckhead, Georgia campus (1976)
- London, United Kingdom campus (1978)
- Los Angeles, California campus (1982)
- Dubai campus (1995, founded as the American University in Dubai)
- Atlanta – Dunwoody campus (1998)
- South Florida campus (1998)
- Online campus (2002)
- Houston, Texas campus (2003)

In 2009, AIU had over 15,000 students and offers a wide range of undergraduate and graduate degrees in programs such as business, IT, criminal justice, healthcare management, education, and media production. More than 80 percent of AIU students attend AIU Online, an internet-based online campus that delivers degree programs 100 percent online. Also in 2009, the school has 54 full-time instructors and 594 part-time instructors.

In March 2019, Career Education Corporation acquired Trident University International, an online for-profit college with approximately 4,000 students, and planned to merge this acquisition into American InterContinental University.

In March 2020, Capitol Forum reported that the U.S. Department of Education allowed AIU to defer $39 million in Title IV money to avoid violating the 90-10 rule.

=== Investigations and controversies ===
AIU's parent company, Career Education Corporation (now named Perdoceo Education Corporation) has been investigated by the U.S. Departments of Justice and Education and the Securities and Exchange Commission. Allegations specific to AIU include reports that the Los Angeles campus misrepresented its programs and classes, made a practice of admitting students who had not graduated from high school, and included in its enrollment numbers students who had never attended class. A CEC representative stated in July 2007 that the issues at AIU's Los Angeles campus "have been addressed and most have long been resolved."

One of the most outspoken critics of AIU and CEC has been AIU's founder Steve Bostic, who alleged in 2005 that "CECO's Board has allowed management to lose sight of the Company's primary mission of providing quality education services; under these directors, CECO management has sacrificed the quality of student programs, resulting in the severe escalation of student attrition – all for the sake of a 'top-line growth strategy' that cannot be sustained."

On June 21, 2005, the U.S. Department of Education put a freeze on approving CEC's new applications for additional campuses or acquisitions while it examined the company's financial records and compliance with federal student aid regulations. This restriction was lifted in January 2007.

In 2009, AIU whistleblowers alleged that AIU enrolled students who were illiterate and did not possess high school degrees. In Diallo versus American Intercontinental University, students filed a class action lawsuit claiming that the school had defrauded them. The Georgia Appellate Court denied the class action, stating that each student must file a separate claim.

As of 2017, American Intercontinental University was under heightened cash monitoring by the US Department of Education "to provide additional oversight of cash management."

On March 9, 2020, the Department of Veterans Affairs suspended G.I. Bill reimbursement eligibility for American InterContinental University and several other for-profit schools due to what the V.A. said were "erroneous, deceptive, or misleading enrollment and advertising practices", giving the schools 60 days to take "corrective action". The VA withdrew its threat of sanctions in July 2020.

== Funding ==
AIU receives approximately 96% of all funds from the US government, including about $29 million from G.I. Bill funds. It has been sued for defrauding the federal government by taking federal funding while providing substandard education.

== Campuses ==
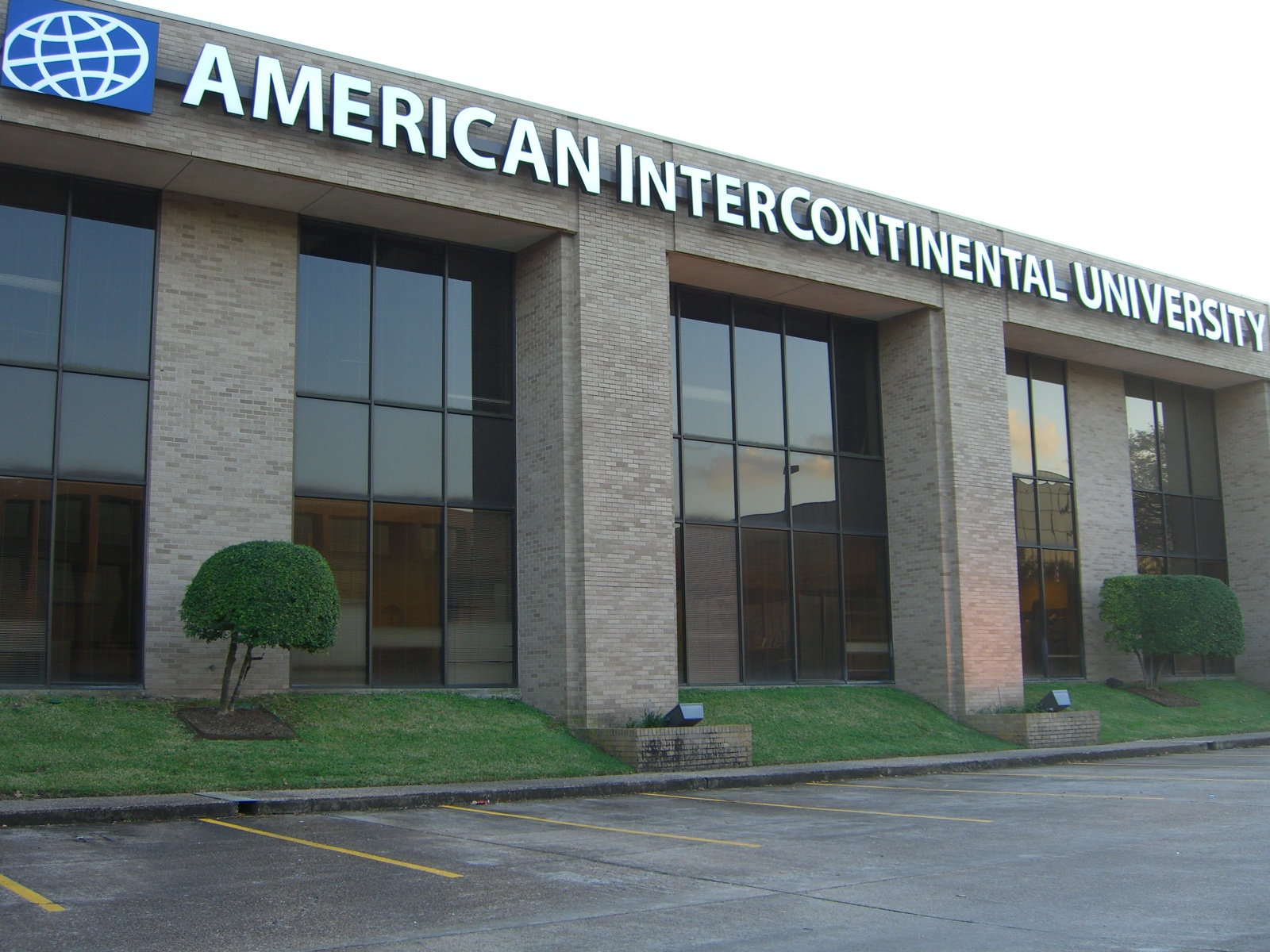
An American InterContinental University facility in Westchase, Houston, Texas, United States

AIU currently has two campuses in the United States, one in Atlanta and one in Houston. Following the June 2009 consolidation of the AIU Buckhead and AIU Dunwoody campuses into AIU Atlanta, the new campus underwent a significant renovation. AIU Atlanta's campus now features an industry-current forensics lab; a virtual firearms training simulator (FATS) lab; drawing studio; dedicated math, science and writing labs; and newly redesigned studios for fashion design, media production, visual communications and interior design.

The AIU Houston building was severely damaged by Hurricane Ike in September 2008. It was remodeled, and a grand re-opening celebration occurred in February 2009.

=== Online campus ===
The online program began in 2001, but was recognized as a separate campus in 2002. Sunitha Araamudhu currently serves as president of AIU Online, which is now considered the main campus for AIU. The online campus offices are located in Schaumburg, Illinois, a northwest suburb of Chicago.

Trident University International has been a member of the American InterContinental University System since 2020 and offers undergraduate, graduate, and doctoral level degrees in a 100% online environment. Founded in 1998, Trident has nearly 27,000 alumni, of which more than 22,000 have a military affiliation. Sunitha Araamudhu currently serves as president of Trident at AIU.

In 2022, California Southern University was acquired by the American InterContinental University System and joined into the overall AIUS community.

=== Former campuses ===
- London, England (located at 110 Marylebone High St.). AIU London became part of Regent's University London in April 2013.
- Los Angeles, California (formerly located at 12655 W. Jefferson Blvd.)
- Dubai, United Arab Emirates (known as American University in Dubai since 1995)

On February 18, 2008, American InterContinental University announced plans to gradually close down its Los Angeles campus. George Miller, president of American InterContinental University, cited low student enrollment at the Los Angeles campus as the reason for this decision.

== Academics ==
AIU offers associate's, bachelor's and master's degrees in a variety of fields. Many instructors are professionals in their field and draw from their real-world experience to enrich classroom instruction and career training. AIU offers classroom instruction in person at the ground campuses and online via the Virtual Campus, or a hybrid of both. The AIU Virtual Campus gives online students access to course materials as well as nearly all the amenities of a traditional campus, such as a library, career services, student clubs and financial aid information. The Virtual Campus was named "Best of the Best" by the Computerworld Honors Program in 2009.

In 2009, My Unique Student Experience (M.U.S.E.) was introduced to a number of courses to supplement learning outside the classroom. M.U.S.E. is a web-based tool that provides access to additional, interactive learning options that help students comprehend course material in a way that appeals to them. The Association of Private Sector Colleges and Universities (APSCU), formerly the Career College Association, recognized AIU's parent company, Career Education Corporation ("CEC"), for M.U.S.E. with its 2010 CCA Innovation Award.

In 2013, AIU launched a proprietary adaptive learning technology called intellipath™ to deliver data-driven personalized learning. The platform assesses students' current understanding of a topic and then tailors the type and order of the lessons presented to meet their individual needs.

In April 2014, AIU introduced intellipath into its MBA in Management, making AIU's program the first MBA in the U.S. driven by adaptive learning technology.

=== Accreditation ===
The institution first received accreditation from the Southern Association of Colleges and Schools (SACS) in 1987. SACS placed the university on probation in December 2005 and renewed AIU's probation in 2006 for failure to comply with various Principles of Accreditation. On December 11, 2007, CEC announced that SACS had removed AIU's probation and that the university's accreditation was once again in good standing.

In 2009, AIU successfully sought to switch accreditation from SACS to the Higher Learning Commission (HLC) of the North Central Association of Colleges and Schools (NCA). School officials felt this was best since the majority of its students were served through its Internet-based campus which was based in the HLC geographic region. SACS and HLC were among the six regional accrediting organizations recognized by the U.S. Department of Education.

The U.S. Department of Education, Office of Inspector General questioned the Higher Learning Commission's decision to approve accreditation of AIU based on the examination of the commission's standards for measuring credit hours and program length. An assistant inspector general stated in the report, "This action by HLC is not in the best interest of students, and calls into question whether the accrediting decisions made by HLC should be relied upon by the Department of Education when assisting students to obtain quality education through the Title IV programs." NCA-HLC president Sylvia Manning responded that this accusation was "flimsy" because it focused on a single accreditation issue involving a single school. SACS president Belle Wheelan sided with NCA-HLC, calling the OIG report "scary" and emphasizing that American InterContinental University's accreditation under SACS had been in "good standing".

In addition to HLC, the university's business programs earned accreditation from the Accreditation Council for Business Schools and Programs in 2011.

In 2013, AIU's Master of Education (M.Ed.) program became one of the first fully online programs to be granted initial two-year accreditation by the Teacher Education Accreditation Council (TEAC).

The AIU London was accredited by the British Accreditation Council for Independent Further and Higher Education until it was absorbed by Regent's College London in April 2013. In June 2008, The Quality Assurance Agency closed an audit published in May 2005 based on an examination of the London Campus in 2004. This report had noted that at the date of the Agency's review in 2004, there were "fundamental concerns regarding the academic standards being achieved." Following successful efforts on the London campus to remedy deficiencies, the QAA noted that, "Since the audit QAA has been provided with information that indicates that appropriate action has been taken by the American InterContinental University in response to the findings of this report. As a result, the audit was signed off in June 2008."

=== Student outcomes ===
According to the National Center for Education Statistics, As of 2024 AIU has a 6-year bachelor's degree graduation rate of 8% and only a 20% retention rate for first time students pursuing bachelor's degrees. Average salary after attending is $36,578.

=== Rankings ===
American InterContinental University was ranked No. 8 on the internal Department of Education analysis obtained by The Center for Investigative Reporting that shows 133 for-profit colleges are so dependent on taxpayer money that they would be violating a law designed to prevent profiteering without a loophole that excludes GI Bill assistance to active duty military, with over 96% of revenue coming from these taxpayer funded programs.

=== Enrollment policies ===
AIU has an open-enrollment policy and, in the past, critics have scrutinized the university's student recruiting practices. One anonymous professor told The Chronicle of Higher Education: "If you can breathe and walk, you can get into the school." In July 2008, former employees filed a lawsuit alleging that the school's admissions practices defrauded federal grant and loan programs. The lawsuits against enrollment practices were dismissed in 2012.

AIU does not accept applications from residents of Massachusetts and New York.

== Notable people ==
- Teni Apata, Nigerian musician
- Zee Avi, Malaysian musician
- Ronald Brise, Haitian-born U.S. politician; member of the Florida House of Representatives
- Halima Dangote, Nigerian businesswoman
- Tatiana Santo Domingo, U.S.-born Colombian-Brazilian socialite
- Eddie Gaven, American soccer player
- Mohd Nazifuddin Najib, son of Najib Razak, former Prime Minister of Malaysia
- Georg von Opel (born 1966), German billionaire
- Christian Siriano, American fashion designer, became known on Project Runway.
- Porsha Williams, American reality-TV star and singer

== See also ==
- List of colleges and universities in metropolitan Atlanta
