= Brooks College =

For-profit college in California, US

Brooks College was a for-profit college in Long Beach and Sunnyvale, California. Brooks College closed in 2008 after 35 years.

== History ==
Brooks College had two campuses owned by Career Education Corporation: in Long Beach, California, and in Sunnyvale, California.

Brooks College was founded in 1964 as Collegiate Inn to provide student housing to California State University, Long Beach. It reorganized as Brooks College for Women in 1971. In 1974, the name changed to simply Brooks College.

In 2007, Career Education Corporation announced that it would close Brooks College, and began attempting to sell Brooks College because of accreditation problems and "scrutiny by the U.S. Department of Education".

The Sunnyvale operation closed in June 2008; the Long Beach campus closed in December 2008. A 2009 exposé by CBS News reporter Steve Croft said Brooks College was "facing allegations that it deceived investors, the federal government, and students, who say they've been taught a very expensive lesson".

The property in Long Beach that was leased by Brooks College was sold to the California State University, Long Beach Foundation for use as CSULB student housing.

== See also ==
- Diploma mill
