= Pi Theta Epsilon =

American occupational therapy honor society

- ΠΘΕ
- Founded: 1959; 67 years ago University of New Hampshire
- Type: Honor
- Affiliation: ACHS
- Status: Active
- Emphasis: Occupational therapy
- Scope: National
- Colors: Navy and Gold
- Publication: PTE Scroll & Pen
- Chapters: 155
- Headquarters: c/o AOTF; 12300 Twinbrook Parkway, Suite 520; Rockville, Maryland 20852; United States
- Website: www.aotf.org/pithetaepsilon

Pi Theta Epsilon (ΠΘΕ) is the scholastic honor society of the American Occupational Therapy Foundation that recognizes academic achievement among students in the field of occupational therapy.

== History ==
Pi Theta Epsilon was founded at the University of New Hampshire in 1959 as a scholastic honor society to recognize academic achievement among students in the field of occupational therapy. Professor Anne Henderson, now professor emerita at Boston University, helped established the society. Its three founding members were Faith Barnett, Mickey Lane Leavey, and Nancy Anne Morehouse.

The society became a national organization with the establishment of the Beta chapter at Colorado State University. This was followed by Gamma chapter at Kalamazoo State University (now Western Michigan University) and Delta chapter at Texas Woman's University. The University of New Hampshire became the Alpha chapter and was the Pi Theta Epsilon national headquarters from 1959 and 1970. The national headquarters moved to the University of North Dakota in 1983.

It is now associated with the American Occupational Therapy Foundation. Its headquarters is located in Rockville, Maryland. It was admitted to the Association of College Honor Societies in 1996. By 2011, it had 89 active chapters and 950 active members.

== Symbols ==
The initials of the society's name, ΠΘΕ, were selected to represent Greek words related to occupational therapy.

- Pi is from the first letter of the Greek word for advancement.
- Theta comes from the first letter of the Greek word for therapeutic.
- Epsilon was chosen because it is the first letter of the Greek word for occupation.

The society's colors are navy and gold. The Pi Theta Epsilon pin was trademarked as its official service mark in November 1993.

Its publication is The Scroll & Pen.

== Membership ==
Pi Theta Epsilon has several types of members: student, alumni, sustaining, retroactive, and honorary.

== Chapters ==
Pi Theta Epsilon has 155 chapters across the United States.

== See also ==
- Honor society
