= American Occupational Therapy Foundation =

U.S. nonprofit organization

The American Occupational Therapy Foundation (AOTF) is a charitable, scientific and educational nonprofit organization founded in 1965.

== Mission ==
The purpose of AOTF is to advance the science of occupational therapy to support people's full participation in meaningful life activities.

== Governance ==
The foundation is governed by a board of trustees and awards grants for scientific research and scholarships. Alice C. Jantzen was the AOTF's first president, serving from 1965 to 1966.

== Publication ==
The American Occupational Therapy Foundation publishes a scientific journal, OTJR, Occupation, Participation and Health, indexed by the National Library of Medicine and others.

== Sponsorship ==
AOTF sponsors the honor society Pi Theta Epsilon. It is based in Rockville, Maryland.
