= Perdoceo =

American for-profit postsecondary higher education provider

Perdoceo Education Corporation
- Type: Public
- Traded as: Nasdaq: PRDO; S&P 600 component
- Industry: Higher education and training services
- Headquarters: Schaumburg, Illinois, U.S.
- Number of locations: United States; fewer than 10 campuses, including online
- Key people: Todd S. Nelson (president and CEO)
- Revenue: $688.4 Million (2021)
- Operating income: $141.8 Million (2021)
- Net income: $104.4 Million (2021)
- Total assets: $899.2 Million (2021)
- Number of employees: 4,300 (2021)
- Website: perdoceoed.com

Perdoceo Education Corporation (PRDO) is a public company that owns five for-profit universities in the United States: American Intercontinental University, Colorado Technical University, California Southern University, Trident University International, and University of St. Augustine for Health Sciences. The company was previously known as Career Education Corporation.

== History ==
Career Education was founded in 1994 by John M. Larson who served as the company's president, CEO and was a member of the board of directors until 2006. Under his leadership, Career Education grew to include over 24 U.S. campuses. On July 1, 2003, Career Education Corporation merged with competitor Whitman Education Group, Inc., gaining control over the latter's Sanford-Brown Colleges, Ultrasound Diagnostic Schools (later known as the Sanford-Brown Institute), and Colorado Technical University. They also obtained the former Western School of Health and Business. In the same year, CEC was sued for inflating financial results and issuing misleading statements, violating the Securities Exchange Act.

In March 2007, Gary McCullough joined the company and served as CEO until November 2011, when Steven H. Lesnik assumed the role of interim president and CEO. Lesnik was the former chairman of the Illinois State Board of Education. In 2009, Career Education purchased the right to operate Le Cordon Bleu schools in the United States and Canada. In April 2013, Scott Steffey, a veteran of Strayer Education Inc. and former vice chancellor of the State University of New York (SUNY) system, was named as Lesnik's permanent replacement.

According to a 2014 US Senate Health, Education, Labor, and Pensions report, 48% of Career Education's programs would have failed or been at risk of failing the US Department of Education's new "gainful employment" standards. Until 2015, California Regent Richard Blum (Senator Dianne Feinstein's husband) was a significant shareholder of Career Education stock despite allegations of conflict of interest.

Todd S. Nelson was named CEO of Career Education Corporation in 2015. Nelson was previously the CEO of Apollo Group (parent company of University of Phoenix) and Education Management Corporation (the parent company of the Art Institutes, Argosy University, Brown Mackie College, and South University). The organization closed most of its 50 campuses in the United States as the corporation downsized to two primarily online brands: American InterContinental University and Colorado Technical University. In 2016, Career Education Corporation had about 43,000 students. However, approximately 9,400 students came from schools that were shutting down.

In March 2017, Secretary of Education Betsy DeVos appointed Robert Eitel, a former Career Education vice president, as an advisor. In March 2019, Career Education Corporation entered into an agreement with Trident University International, an online for-profit college with approximately 4,000 students, for $35–$44 million, and merged this acquisition into American InterContinental University. In September 2019, The Capitol Forum reported that CECO schools "enjoyed an uptick in growth but have declined in quality metrics—spending on instruction, number of dropouts and bad debt all worsened, sometimes dramatically so."

On January 1, 2020, Career Education Corporation officially changed its name to Perdoceo. In March 2020, The Capitol Forum reported that the US Department of Education allowed Perdoceo and its subsidiary AIU to defer $39 million in Title IV money to avoid violating the 90/10 rule.

In 2021, Perdoceo acquired DigitalCrafts for $18.4 million and Hippo Education for $43.3 million. In 2022 Andrew Hurst replaced Todd Nelson as CEO. The same year, the corporation acquired California Southern University for $40 million.

On July 16, 2024, Perdoceo Education Corporation announced that its expects to pay approximately $142 million to $144 million in cash at closing to acquire 100% ownership of the University of St. Augustine for Health Sciences. The Company expects to complete the acquisition in December 2024.

=== Lawsuits, investigations, and controversies ===
Career Education was investigated by the United States Securities and Exchange Commission for issues of non-compliance in 2005. On February 15, 2005, the company announced an adjustment related to an increase in the estimate for its allowance for doubtful accounts and a restatement for a change in revenue recognition method for its culinary and healthcare externships. In January 2008, CEC reported that the SEC has closed its investigation and will take no action against the company. A Department of Justice investigation began in 2004 and was terminated in April 2007, with the DOJ declining prosecution.

In June 2005, the U.S. Department of Education prohibited CECO from expanding until it had resolved issues with financial statements and program reviews connected with its Collins College and Brooks College. In January 2007, the U.S. Department of Education lifted its restrictions on the company opening new schools or acquiring existing ones. Career Education's American InterContinental University was placed on probation in December 2005 with its accrediting agency, SACS. The probation status was reviewed after one year, in December 2006, and extended an additional 12 months. On December 11, 2007, CEC announced that SACS has removed AIU's probation and that the university's accreditation remains in good standing.

Brooks College, a Career Education owned school, was the subject of an unfavorable examination of for-profit trade schools in the CBS news magazine 60 Minutes which focused on alleged misrepresentations by admission representatives to prospective students. A CBS producer with a hidden camera visited several Career Education schools in the New York area, including the Katharine Gibbs School. In January 2007, the New York State Education Department reported deficiencies at the Katharine Gibbs School's New York campus. The problems related to faculty qualifications and remedial course offerings. Career Education has since closed Katharine Gibbs School's New York campus. In June of the same year, Career Education announced its plan to close both campuses of Brooks College.

California Culinary Academy, which was purchased by Career Education in 1999, was the subject of an unfavorable article in the San Francisco Weekly focusing on alleged misrepresentations and omissions made to prospective students to enroll them in the school. According to the Chronicle of Higher Education, a lawsuit was filed over the matter, which resulted in Career Education Corp. paying $10 million in settlement fees.

On November 1, 2011, Career Education's chief executive officer resigned as corporate profits significantly fell and allegations were made involving inflated student placement statistics at its career-oriented schools in New York. Over the year the stock value dropped about 48%. Steve Lesnik was appointed by the board of directors to serve as the new CEO. Lesnik was a visiting lecturer at Northwestern University and a director of the Illinois Math & Science Academy Foundation. Several lawsuits were filed by investors who claimed they were defrauded. CEO Gary McCullough was paid nearly $9.8 million in 2011.

In 2013, Career Education Corporation paid $10.25 million to settle the state of New York's claim that the company systematically deceived students by advertising bogus job placement rates. In 2014, Career Education Corporation was under investigation by more than a dozen states Attorneys General, although no charges have been filed by them. The company said it was cooperating fully with the request for information. The New York Times also reported that if the Obama administration's "gainful employment" proposals were to go into effect, 39% of Career Education's programs would fail student loan debt-to-earnings measurements, making them ineligible for federal funds. In 2015, the US Department of Education reported that Career Education Corporation schools were under heightened cash monitoring because of concerns about their finances or compliance with federal requirements. In 2016, The Securities and Exchange Commission requested documents information regarding Career Education's fourth quarter 2014 classification of its Le Cordon Bleu campuses. The New Jersey Supreme Court also ruled that Sanford–Brown students could sue Career Education Corporation despite an arbitration clause in their contracts. The students claimed that they were misled and deceived.

In 2019, Career Education Corp. agreed to forgive $493 million in student debt in a settlement with attorneys general from 48 states and the District of Columbia, closing out a 5-year investigation. The company denied wrongdoing. In September 2019, Perdoceo reached a $30 million settlement with the Federal Trade Commission over its fraudulent use of lead generation websites to lure students. In June 2020, an internal employee whistleblower exposed the potentially unethical interference in their job by Diane Auer Jones, currently principal deputy undersecretary at the Education Department. Jones was “vice president of regulatory and external affairs for Career Education Corporation, where she was responsible for companywide regulatory operations, licensure and accreditation, government affairs, among other things, and oversaw the organization's political action committee.” Also in 2020, the Department of Veterans Affairs threatened to cut off funding to Colorado Technical Institute and American Intercontinental University. The Trump Administration, however, sided with the for-profit schools.

=== Downsizing ===
In June 2007 Career Education announced that it would close the Brooks College campuses in Sunnyvale and Long Beach, California, and the Pittsburgh branch of the International Academy of Design and Technology. No new enrollments would be accepted, and the final graduation dates would be September 2008 at the Sunnyvale campus, December 2008 in Pittsburgh, and March 2009 in Long Beach. In February 2008 Career Education Corporation announced that it would phase out operations of nine money-losing colleges, including several Gibbs College campuses, Lehigh Valley College, and McIntosh College in New Hampshire and to seek permission to convert two Gibbs college locations to Sanford-Brown College campuses. On February 18, 2008, CECO's American InterContinental University announced plans to gradually close down its Los Angeles campus. Current students would have the opportunity to complete their programs, but no new students would be enrolled. Dr. George Miller, CEO of American InterContinental University, said "the impact of a two-year probation, coupled with the current market for AIU's programs in Los Angeles, is such that the student population at the campus has decreased significantly, and likely will not reach the sustainable level necessary to support the addition of new programs and necessary resources."

In January 2011, the company announced it would be laying off 600 people. Due to continued declining enrollment, additional plans to lay off as much as 7% of CEC's workforce (900 jobs) and close 23 schools were announced on November 8, 2012. The corporation made the announcement as it reported a $33.1 million net loss for the third quarter of 2012, as well a 23 percent decline in enrollment from a year ago. The Chicago Sun Times explained that "a U.S. Senate committee report last summer criticized for-profit schools for focusing on their own profits above their students’ job-readiness and for burdening students with loan debt at taxpayers’ expense. The scrutiny has hurt for-profit college enrollment." 25% of the current faculty at the California Culinary Academy were notified of their termination in mid November, effective December 31, 2012.Year over year, student enrollment dropped 16% from 2012 to 2013.

In 2015, Harrington College of Design in Chicago announced a planned closure. Purchased by Career Education Corporation in 1999, the school experienced declining enrollment and closed permanently in August 2018. On May 7, 2015, CECO announced the closure of its 14 remaining Sanford-Brown Colleges. Teach-outs of the remaining students were expected to take at least 18 months, depending on their programs. On December 16, 2015, CECO announced that it would close all 16 Le Cordon Bleu campuses in the United States. CECO had previously placed the brand up for sale.

== Funding ==
In the 2011 fiscal year, over 95% of Career Education Corporation's funds came from enrolling students whose tuition was paid for by programs sponsored by the US federal government, with about $67 million annually coming from the US Department of Defense and Veterans Administration.

== Schools ==
=== Open ===
- American InterContinental University (AIU)
- Colorado Technical University (CTU)
- California Southern University (acquired in 2022)
- Trident University International (acquired by Career Education Corporation in 2019)
- University of St. Augustine for Health Sciences (acquired in 2024)
- Hippo Education (acquired 2021)

=== Closed ===
- Briarcliffe College (closed 2018)
- Brooks College, Long Beach and Sunnyvale, California (closed, campuses sold in 2007)
- Brooks Institute (sold in 2015, closed in 2016)
- Collins College Art and Technical colleges (closed December 2012)
- DigitalCrafts (acquired 2021)
- Gibbs College School (closed 2008)
- Harrington College of Design (closed 2018)
- Le Cordon Bleu (closed 2017)
- Missouri College (sold in 2015, closed in 2016)
- Sanford-Brown Colleges and Institutes (closed 2017)
