= International Academy of Design and Technology =

For-profit media arts college in the US

Coordinates: 42°2′0″N 88°1′57″W

The International Academy of Design and Technology (IADT) was a private for-profit media arts college in the United States with over ten branches. It was owned by Career Education Corporation. The institution was briefly merged with Sanford-Brown in 2014 before being closed in 2015.

== History ==
In 1977, Clem Stein Jr. founded the International Academy of Merchandising and Design, Ltd in Chicago. The first branch opened in Tampa, Florida in 1984. Other Branches were opened in other major U.S. cities, early on including a Toronto, Canada location. The college changed its name in 1999 and 2000 to reflect expanded design and technology programs.

In early 2004, institutional leaders announced that the Fairmont, West Virginia campus would soon close. Four years later, the Pittsburgh campus was closed. IADT Toronto closed in 2009.

The Toronto location had grown very large from its small beginnings in the mid-1980s, and included programs in Fashion Design, Interior Design, and by the mid-1990s programs in video editing, 3D Animation and design, and later Film production. IADT Toronto owners petitioned the provincial Ontario Ministry of Education and Training to allow it provide university degrees for its programs like that provided to similar branches and other companies similar to IADT in the United States. This was rejected by the Ontario Government as post secondary education, especially university level education is highly guarded by provincial governments in Canada. The owners quickly sold off the IADT Toronto programs to RCC Institute of Technology by the end of 2008. It was rebranded as The Academy of Design, using similar graphic branding.

In April 2010, CEC faced a large civil suit from previous students from IADT Pittsburgh, IADT WV, and IADT Toronto citing registration fraud, improper credit transfers, and false pretense. The previous students won the civil suit with an undisclosed amount offered.

In 2011, CEC settled a class action lawsuit claiming violations of the Telephone Consumer Protection Act. IADT had sent out approximately 100,000 unsolicited text message advertisements in 2008. A $20 million settlement fund was established.

In 2014, CEC announced that it would merge IADT all its other educational divisions under the Sanford-Brown name. The merged institution closed in 2015.

== Academics ==
IADT was accredited by the Accrediting Council for Independent Colleges and Schools (ACICS).

== Notable alumni ==
- Ashley A. Woods, comic artist
