= Sanford–Brown =

For profit education company in the United States

Sanford-Brown
- Type: For-profit
- Active: 1920–2017
- Campus: 18 locations in the United States
- Website: www.sanfordbrown.edu

Sanford–Brown (also known as the Sanford–Brown College or Sanford–Brown Institute) was a division of the Career Education Corporation, a proprietary, for-profit higher education organization.

The school traced its history back to the 1860s as a successor to a St. Louis location of Brown's Business College owned by George W. Brown (1845-1918). There were 18 private colleges and schools bearing the name Sanford–Brown across the United States. Sanford–Brown provided post-secondary educational opportunities to students as well as student services and career assistance.

Sanford–Brown's career training programs included paths in Healthcare, Dental, Design, Media Arts, Nursing, Technology and Business. The school also offered online courses and fully online programs.

The closure of all Sanford–Brown schools was announced in May 2015 by the Career Education Corporation.

== History ==
George W. Brown developed a chain of business schools in the early 1900s. The chain included 29 locations by 1911. In 1920, W.S. Sanford purchased a St. Louis location from Brown's network and renamed it the Sanford- Brown Business College. In 1972, the College moved from St. Louis to St. Ann, Missouri. The 'business' part of the name was dropped in 1992. The college was purchased by Whitman Education Group, Inc. in 1994, then Career Education Corporation in 2003.

In March 2014, Sanford–Brown united the International Academy of Design and Technology (IADT) in Chicago, Las Vegas, Orlando, Seattle, San Antonio and Tampa with Brown College (Minnesota) in Mendota Heights and Brooklyn Center under the Sanford–Brown name.

On May 7, 2015, Career Education Corporation announced the closure of the remaining 14 schools. They will no longer accept new applicants and currently enrolled students will be given at least 18 months to complete their programs.

== Social responsibility ==
As part of its commitment to local communities and the healthcare profession, Sanford–Brown supported Ronald McDonald House Charities. The partnership included gifts of volunteer time and fundraisers by the school on behalf of the families supported by the charity.

== Accreditation ==
Sanford–Brown schools were nationally accredited by either the Accrediting Council for Independent Colleges and Schools (ACICS) or the Accrediting Commission of Career Schools and Colleges (ACCSC). Additionally, over 60 academic programs at Sanford–Brown were individually accredited.

== Controversy ==
In 2007, twelve former students filed a lawsuit against Sanford–Brown College and its parent company, Career Education Corporation, alleging that Sanford–Brown engaged in aggressive and misleading recruiting tactics and misled them about the transferability of Sanford–Brown's credits and the nature of its curriculum, training, and faculty. One year later, four nursing students filed a class action lawsuit alleging that the college "fraudulently induced them and the class to join a medical assistant program through a number of deceptive acts." In late 2010, this lawsuit was granted class action status.

In 2011, Career Education Corporation hired an outside legal firm to audit its career placement office. Auditors found widespread problems, which led to the resignation of the company's Chief Executive and the firing of 15 career services employees. Also in 2011, because of his professional leadership and trusted role in education, CEC Board of Directors appointed Steve Lesnik as its interim President and Chief Executive Officer until in 2013, Scott Steffey, former vice chancellor of State University of New York (SUNY) system, took over that role permanently. Also in 2013, a settlement agreement was reached with the New York Attorney General and CEC agreed to establish a $9.25 million restitution fund for students who were misled from the 2009 through 2012 school years.

== Campuses closed in 2011 ==
After taking into account enrollment levels and financial viability, and as part of an internal reorganization, Career Education Corporation announced in December 2012, that they would begin a gradual "teach-out" of numerous Sanford–Brown campuses throughout the United States. Campuses that teach-out will no longer accept applications and, ultimately, discontinue operations after all the current students have graduated.

- Sanford–Brown College – Phoenix, Arizona
- Sanford–Brown College – Farmington, Connecticut
- Sanford–Brown Institute – Orlando, Florida
- Sanford–Brown College – Tinley Park, Illinois
- Sanford–Brown College – Skokie, Illinois
- Sanford–Brown College – Hillside, Illinois
- Sanford–Brown College – Indianapolis, Indiana
- Sanford–Brown Institute – Landover, Maryland
- Sanford–Brown College – Boston, Massachusetts
- Sanford–Brown College – Grand Rapids, Michigan
- Sanford–Brown College – Dearborn, Michigan closed 2014
- Sanford–Brown College – Fenton, Missouri
- Sanford–Brown College – St. Peters, Missouri
- Sanford–Brown Institute – White Plains, New York
- Sanford–Brown College – Cleveland, Ohio
- Sanford–Brown College – Portland, Oregon
- Sanford–Brown Institute – Monroeville, Pennsylvania
- Sanford–Brown Institute – Pittsburgh, Pennsylvania
- Sanford–Brown Institute – Trevose, Pennsylvania
- Sanford–Brown Institute – Wilkens Township, Pennsylvania
- Sanford–Brown Institute – Cranston, Rhode Island
- Sanford–Brown College – Austin, Texas
- Sanford–Brown College – North Loop, Texas
- Sanford–Brown College – Tysons Corner, Virginia
- Sanford–Brown College – Milwaukee, Wisconsin
- Sanford–Brown Institute - Manhattan, New York city

== Campuses closed in 2015 or no longer enrolling students as of 2015 ==
=== Sanford–Brown College ===
- Sanford–Brown College – Jacksonville, Florida
- Sanford–Brown College – Ft. Lauderdale, Florida
- Sanford–Brown College – Tampa, Florida
- Sanford–Brown College – Atlanta, Georgia
- Sanford–Brown College – Mendota Heights, Minnesota (closed 2017)
- Sanford–Brown College – Brooklyn Center, Minnesota (closed 2017)
- Sanford–Brown College – Dallas, Texas
- Sanford–Brown College – Houston, Texas
- Sanford–Brown College – San Antonio, Texas
- Sanford–Brown College – Tukwila, Washington
- Sanford–Brown College – Las Vegas, Nevada

=== Sanford–Brown Institute ===
- Sanford–Brown Institute – Iselin, New Jersey
- Sanford–Brown Institute – Garden City|Sanford–Brown Institute – Garden City, New York
- Sanford–Brown Institute Trevose
- Sanford–Brown Institute Northloop
- Sanford–Brown Institute – Tampa
- Sanford–Brown Institute – Jacksonville
- Sanford–Brown Institute - Cranston, Rhode Island

=== Sanford–Brown affiliates ===
- SBI Campus – Melville, Long Island, New York

=== Sanford–Brown Online ===
- Tampa, Florida
