= George Gollin =

American physics professor

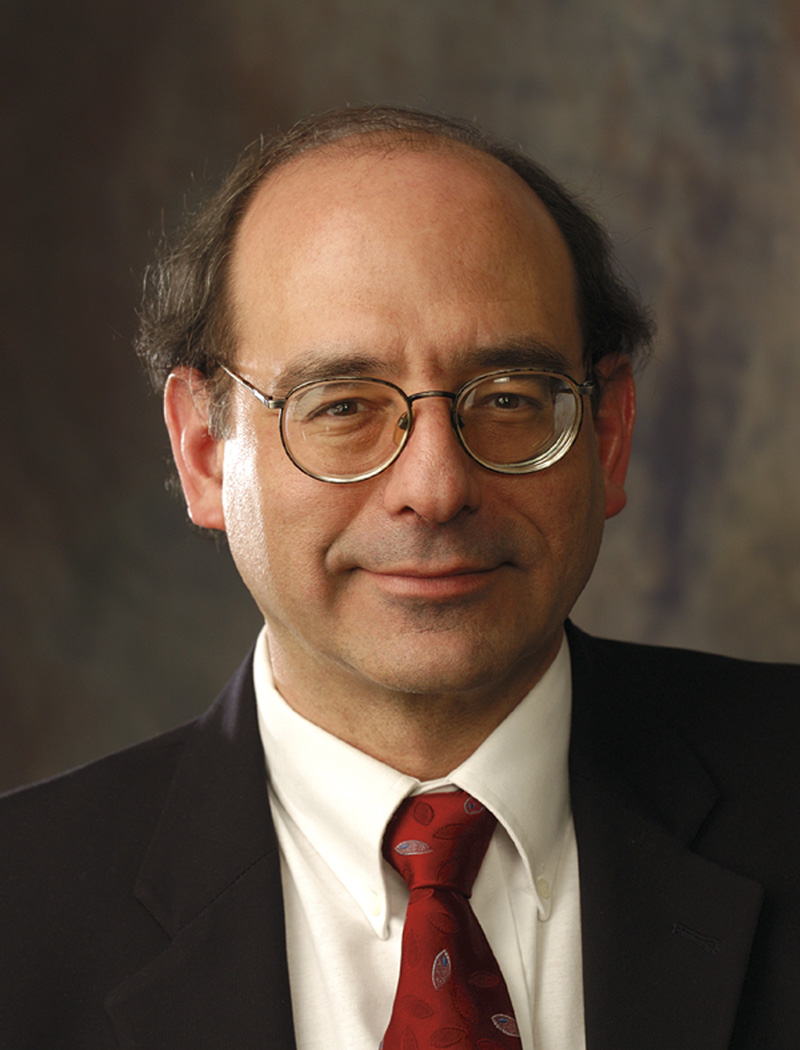
- Born: May 6, 1953 (age 73); New York
- Political party: Democratic

George D. Gollin (born May 6, 1953) is an American physics professor at the University of Illinois at Urbana-Champaign. Besides his work on particle physics and the International Linear Collider, he has since 2003 made numerous efforts in fighting institutions which are considered to be diploma mills, which has caused him to receive significant public attention. Gollin placed second in the 2014 Democratic primary for Illinois's 13th congressional district.

== Areas of research and teaching ==
Gollin has worked on particle physics experiments studying muon scattering (1975–1981, intended to test the ideas of "Quantum Chromodynamics"), neutral K meson decay parameters (1980–1993, measuring things relating to "CP violation"), and electron-positron annihilation (1993–2005, measuring production and decay properties of heavy quarks). His current research focuses on technical issues associated with the design and construction of the "International Linear Collider", a very large electron-positron colliding beams facility intended to shed light on the origins of the masses of the fundamental particles.

His teaching has spanned the entire physics curriculum, from elementary algebra-based courses for students in the life sciences to classical electrodynamics at the graduate level.

== Other public service ==
The University of Illinois is a public university and "land grant school"; as such, Gollin's responsibilities include faculty public service in addition to his teaching and research obligations. Since 2003, Gollin has been documenting the practices of alleged diploma mills, which are believed to sell meaningless academic degrees without providing education or assessment to/of their customers. In this capacity, he has worked with a number of state and federal agencies, including the State of Washington Office of the Attorney General, the U.S. Dept. of Education, the U.S. Secret Service, and the Swedish National Agency for Higher Education. It was reported in The Chronicle of Higher Education that "Alan Contreras, administrator for the Oregon Office of Degree Authorization, called the professor's work 'superb'." He has, for example, assisted with the federal investigation of the operation of an alleged diploma mill, Saint Regis University. This investigation resulted in closing down the large operation and the conviction on federal criminal charges of eight individuals who were involved.

In 2006 he was elected to the board of directors of the Council for Higher Education Accreditation for a three-year term. He was reelected to a second term in 2009. Also in 2009 Gollin was named a Guggenheim Fellow by the John Simon Guggenheim Memorial Foundation. George Gollin said of the fellowship, "I will use the term of the Fellowship to write a book about the nine-year trajectory and spectacular immolation of St. Regis, and the resulting increase in international attention to the problem of diploma mills."

== 2014 U.S. House campaign ==
Gollin announced in July 2013 his intention to run for the Illinois 13th Congressional District. He faced Ann Callis and David Green in the Democratic Party primary on March 18, 2014. Gollin was endorsed by the News-Gazette, Chicago Tribune, and the State Journal-Register. According to The Hill, Gollin "isn't seen by Washington Democrats as a strong candidate."

== See also ==
- Accreditation mill
- List of recognized higher education accreditation organizations
- List of unaccredited institutions of higher education
- List of unrecognized higher education accreditation organizations
- Unaccredited institutions of higher education
