= Concordia College and University =

Diploma mill

Concordia College and University is a diploma mill and unaccredited institution of higher education with a primary mailing address in Delaware. It represents itself as a real life institution that awards associate, bachelor's, master's and doctoral degrees based solely on the purchaser's work and life experience, with some credits transferred in. Although the name is similar, Concordia College and University is not in any way affiliated with any of the regionally accredited institutions within the six-member Concordia University System.

== Locations ==
Concordia College and University has used multiple addresses. For most of its existence it has stated that it is incorporated in Dominica, but it also has listed addresses in locations including the U.S. Virgin Islands, Spain, and Liberia. As of February 2011, one of the multiple Internet domains used by this entity lists its name as "Concordia College & University Delaware," founded in Roseau, British West Indies (Dominica) in 1999, with a location in Wilmington, Delaware.

== Accreditation ==
Concordia College and University is not accredited by any higher education accrediting body recognized in the United States or most other countries where its degrees are advertised. It is not recognized by UNESCO. It is accredited by the National Academy of Higher Education, an entity that is not recognized as a prior learning and life education accreditor by the United States Department of Education or the Council on Higher Education Accreditation and that several educational organizations identify as an unrecognized accreditation organization or accreditation mill. In 2003, Concordia College and University was reported to be claiming accreditation by the Distance Graduation Accrediting Association, which is not recognized as an accreditor by the U.S. Department of Education . In 2009, Concordia College and University was listed as a diploma mill by the American Association of Collegiate Registrars and Admissions Officers. According to John Bear, it has an address in Sioux Falls, South Dakota, and gives degrees based on "life experience". Concordia College and University is not affiliated with any of the accredited schools within the U.S.-based Concordia University System. Schools within the Concordia System are regionally accredited and are branded as Concordia University, Concordia College, or Concordia University School of Law.

In September 2004, The East Carolinian, the student newspaper of East Carolina University in Greenville, North Carolina reported that "There are at least a half-dozen legitimate Concordia colleges and Concordia universities around the country. But Concordia College and University is a diploma mill that offers degrees in as little turnaround time as 12 hours." The article noted, "The fake Concordia College and University admonishes Web surfers to 'be safe and purchase a government approved degree.' The government, it turns out, is war-torn Liberia. The school's offices are in Dominica, and its U.S. mailing address is in Saint John, U.S. Virgin Islands. Its website domain is in Pakistan."

A Special Report from Matthew Kauffman in the Hartford Courant says "[l]ike other schools, Concordia touts its accreditation, so I went in search of the U.S. National Academic Higher Education Agency — which inexplicably goes by the acronym NAHED. I found the agency's website at accreditation.ga, meaning that a group whose name begins with "U.S." has a website registered in the central African country of Gabon" and that "[c]ritics say that operators of diploma mills intentionally choose names that are similar or identical to recognized schools", noting that "at least a dozen legitimate institutions throughout the country named Concordia..."

== Concerns by U.S. state regulators ==
The Oregon Office of Degree Authorization lists a "Concordia College and University" in its list of unaccredited degree suppliers, and notes that it is a Class B misdemeanor in Oregon to use an unlawful degree.

Concordia College and University also appears on a State of Michigan list of non-accredited colleges and universities.

In 2003 the North Dakota Legislative Assembly moved forward a bill "that would punish anyone trying to use a degree from a diploma mill as a legitimate credential." In a 2003 article discussing the legislation, The Chronicle of Higher Education stated that "state officials are concerned that illegitimate institutions are mimicking the names of legitimate ones," citing as an example "an entity called Concordia College & University" whose name is similar to that of Concordia College in Moorhead, Minnesota, an accredited school attended by many North Dakota students. The article further noted that for Concordia College & University "No classes or exams are required. Associate and bachelor's degrees cost $599, master's degrees $699, and doctorates $1,099, including shipping and handling, the site says, noting that degree recipients get a certified diploma and two transcripts, complete with watermarks."

In September 2009, Mississippi Secretary of State Delbert Hosemann warned residents about Concordia College and University. Hosemann said Concordia College and University LLC has been using the secretary of state's Web site to misrepresent the organization as a licensed educational institution. Hosemann said Concordia College is a registered limited liability corporation, but it is not accredited as an educational institution in Mississippi. Hosemann said a cease and desist letter had been sent to Concordia demanding that it remove the false and misleading claims from the company Web site.

== Individual cases ==
=== Seneca County, Ohio ===
In October 2006 a Seneca County, Ohio grand jury indicted John McGuire, the new police chief of Fostoria, Ohio on two felony counts of tampering with records and two misdemeanor charges of falsification involving his qualifications. The Toledo Blade noted he "obtained a criminal-justice degree from Concordia College and University, an online degree program in the Virgin Islands."

In February 2007, the paper reported that documents filed in a drug case showed that Rocko, a police dog in the Fostoria police department, had also received a bachelor of science degree in criminal justice from Concordia in 2006. The dog's degree was planned to be used as evidence in the court trial, but the prosecutor noted "I don't think it's necessary to bring the actual dog." A few weeks later it was revealed that the degree had been purchased by Greg Peiffer, general manager and president of Fostoria radio station WFOB, who said it was obtained with minimal effort.

The trial of McGuire was originally scheduled for March 2007 but was delayed. In May, McGuire testified that the degree was based on a combination of life experience and transferred credits from courses he took at the U.S. Air Force Community College. The judge in the case ruled that McGuire "earned his degree", noting evidence that McGuire had helped search for bodies at the World Trade Center site after the September 2001 terrorist attacks, had attended the FBI Academy, had assisted in the search for Olympic Park bomber Eric Robert Rudolph, and had served in Operation Desert Storm. With regard to the diploma awarded to the dog, the judge said that "This court finds no similarity between those two degrees."

=== Louise Wightman ===
In May 2007 Louise Wightman of Norwell, Massachusetts, was convicted of fraud and larceny for misrepresenting herself as a licensed psychologist and for falsely advertising that she held a doctorate in psychology. Part of her crime was claiming to have a Ph.D. based on having received a degree from Concordia. She holds a valid master's degree and devoted five years of study to a Ph.D. program which she did not complete. She is therefore legally qualified to use the term "psychotherapist" but not "psychologist" according to state licensing requirements.

She told the jury that she felt she had earned a Ph.D., so she paid about $1,300 to obtain her degree (Ph.D. with a major in psychology) over the Internet from Concordia College and University. This credential ultimately proved to be worthless.

=== Joe Galloway ===
In 2010, IT services firm EDS lost a court case brought by broadcaster BSkyB after the British High Court ruled that the company had misled BSkyB about its expertise. Part of EDS' case hinged on the testimony of Joe Galloway, a former Managing Director for CRM Solutions, who provided implementation timeframes to BSkyB that later turned out to be unrealistic. Galloway's credibility as a witness was severely undermined by his defence of a mail-order degree from Concordia. Although he "gave detailed evidence on how he took plane journeys between the islands and attended a college there", a member of the opposing legal team managed to obtain the same degree for his dog "Lulu". The blow to the witness' credibility was reported as pivotal to the success of the case.

=== Smith County, Texas ===
In 2013, a whistle-blower at the Smith County Sheriffs department alleged that she was retaliated against after not complying with a deputy attempting to gain a pay increase based on a diploma from Concordia College and University in Wilmington, Delaware; the whistle-blower objected to the degree submission because she considered the institution a "diploma mill". After an investigation by the Texas Rangers into the degree, the deputy who had tried to use the Concordia College and University, Delaware degree subsequently resigned, surrendered his Peace Officer license permanently, and paid back his extra earnings and thereby did not face prosecution. The department settled with the whistle-blower.

== See also ==
- List of unaccredited institutions of higher learning
