= International Accreditation Agency for Online Universities =

The International Accreditation Agency for Online Universities (IAAOU) is a self-styled "accreditation" board based in the United States. It has no status with the United States Department of Education (USDE) or the Council for Higher Education Accreditation (CHEA). Without USDE and CHEA recognition, its "accreditations" are essentially meaningless.

The Texas Higher Education Coordinating Board has indicated that Rochville University and Belford University, and the agencies from which they claim accreditation, "appear to be operated by the same people".

== Schools claiming IAAOU accreditation ==
- Ashwood University
- Belford University (not to be confused with the University of Bedford which is linked to University Degree Program, another diploma mill)
- Belford High School

The International Accreditation Agency for Online Universities (IAAOU) is a self-styled "accreditation" board based in the United States. It has no status with the United States Department of Education (USDE) or the Council for Higher Education Accreditation (CHEA).[1] Without USDE and CHEA recognition, its "accreditations" are essentially meaningless.[2]

The Texas Higher Education Coordinating Board has indicated that Rochville University and Belford University, and the agencies from which they claim accreditation, "appear to be operated by the same people"

== See also ==
- Accreditation mill
- Diploma mill
- List of unaccredited institutions of higher learning
- List of unrecognized accreditation associations of higher learning
