= National Academy of Higher Education =

US unrecognized college accreditation agency

National Academy of Higher Education (NAHE) identifies itself as an organization specializing in the evaluation of people's educational credentials. Some United States educational authorities identify it as an unrecognized accreditation organization or accreditation mill. NAHE charges fees for a service described as an evaluation of the educational credentials of clients who have studied in other countries or attained degrees through alternative methods.

== Association of Distance Learning Programs ==
The NAHE subsidiary Association of Distance Learning Programs (ADLP) offers "accreditation" for all types of educational programs worldwide, including schools, colleges, distance learning programs, evaluation of experiential learning, and other non-traditional education programs. ADLP is not, however, recognized by either the United States Department of Education (USDE) or Council for Higher Education Accreditation (CHEA) as a nationally recognized accrediting agency.

=== Accreditation of diploma mills ===
Some organizations, including Concordia College and University, Lacrosse University, and American University of London, that have been identified as diploma mills claim to be "recognized" by NAHE or "accredited" by ADLP. Credential Watch lists both NAHE and ADLP as unrecognized educational accreditation agencies. The California Postsecondary Education Commission lists NAHE as an unrecognized accreditation agency. Accreditation by unrecognized organizations has no known academic value. Organizations that claim accreditation or approval by ADLP and NAHE sometimes acknowledge in their promotional materials that these organizations are unrecognized, but suggest that it is not important for accrediting bodies to have government recognition. For example, the Lacrosse University website states:

ADLP is a private accrediting association not listed with any government agency or the U.S. Department of Education, and is not designed to meet the needs of students intending to utilize federal funds. Students are encouraged to determine, before enrollment, that their degree program or studies meet admission or transfer requirements of other educational institutions, if they seek to continue their education. The University makes no representations, promises, or guarantees of acceptability of transfer credit to any other public or private educational institution. The National Academy of Higher Education (NAHE) evaluates the educational credentials of clients who have studied in other countries or attained degrees through alternative methods or distance learning to determine if they meet equivalency standards of the United States. NAHE is an International Credential Evaluation Service, founded in 1974 to help graduates gain the recognition they need to pursue their career and educational goals.

People who obtain "degrees" from diploma mills that make these types of statements are likely to find that the credentials they bought are not accepted by academic institutions, governments, or employers.

=== Website ===
The website of National Academy of Higher Education as of 2007 is www.nahighered.co.cc, a free URL redirection address; co.cc is an ordinary second-level Cocos (Keeling) Islands domain like any other. The co.cc redirector bills itself as "your free domain for blog" and the nahighered page itself consists of an archived Wayback Machine page from 2005 as nahighered.org, a domain registered using a Canadian whois-privacy service and pointing to a Boston server that is not currently functional.

== National Academy of Higher Education, Pakistan ==
There is a legitimate organization with the name "National Academy of Higher Education" in Pakistan. The organization in Pakistan was not intended to be an educational accreditation body and is not connected to the "National Academy of Higher Education" accreditation mill. Its purpose is solely as a resource for professional development of educators at existing educational institutions. According to the Higher Education Commission, "National Academy of Higher Education is a new initiative of Higher Education Commission for faculty development in the higher education institutions. The objective is to enhance basic competencies in academic practice in higher education."

== See also ==
- List of unrecognized accreditation associations of higher learning
- Accreditation mill
- Education in the United States
