= List of animals awarded human credentials =

List of animals granted human academic credentials to expose diploma mills

This list of animals awarded human credentials includes nonhuman animals who have been submitted as applicants to suspected diploma mills, and have been awarded a diploma. On occasion, they have been admitted and granted a degree, as reported in reliable sources. Animals are often used as a device to clearly demonstrate the lax standards or fraudulent activities of the awarding institutions. In at least one case, a cat's degree helped lead to a successful fraud prosecution against the institution that had issued it.

On occasion, accredited institutions award mock degrees to animals for humorous purposes, e.g. UNSW awarded a "dogtorate" (not doctorate) to a dog; such cases are not included below.

== Cats ==
=== Colby Nolan (MBA) ===
Colby Nolan was a house cat who was awarded an MBA in 2004 by Trinity Southern University, a Dallas-based diploma mill, sparking a fraud lawsuit by the Pennsylvania attorney general's office.

Colby Nolan lived with a deputy attorney general. In looking to expose Trinity Southern University for fraud, undercover agents had the then-six-year-old feline obtain a bachelor's degree in business administration for $299. On the animal's application, the agents claimed that the cat had previously taken courses at a community college, worked at a fast-food restaurant, babysat, and maintained a newspaper route. In response, the institution informed Colby that, due to the job experience listed on his application, he was eligible for an executive MBA which he could obtain for an additional $100. The transcript submitted by the agents claimed that Colby had a GPA of 3.5.

Upon learning that the cat received the degree, Pennsylvania attorney general Jerry Pappert filed a lawsuit against Trinity Southern University. In the lawsuit, Pappert directed the diploma mill, which had used email spam to sell degrees, to provide restitution to anyone who had ordered a degree from them.

In December 2004, the Texas attorney general obtained a temporary restraining order under the Texas Deceptive Trade Practices Act against Trinity Southern and its owners, Craig B. and Alton S. Poe. The court also ordered the school's assets frozen. In March 2005, the Poes were assessed penalties of over $100,000 by the court and were ordered not to market or promote fraudulent, substandard degree programs or to represent their university as being accredited or affiliated with legitimate universities. It was reported that the Poes were also associated with Wesleyan International University and Prixo Southern University. Trinity Southern University's website has been offline since 2005.

=== George (registration for practice as a hypnotherapist) ===
In 2009, George, a cat owned by Chris Jackson (presenter of the BBC show Inside Out North East & Cumbria), was registered as a hypnotherapist after his owner created a fake certificate from a non-existing institution and used it to register with three professional organizations: the British Board of Neuro Linguistic Programming, the United Fellowship of Hypnotherapists, and the Professional Hypnotherapy Practitioner Association.

=== Henrietta (Hettie, certified member of the American Association of Nutritional Consultants) ===
In 2007, the cat Henrietta, despite having been dead for around a year, was successfully registered as a certified member of the American Association of Nutritional Consultants by her owner Ben Goldacre, doctor and author of the Bad Science column in the Guardian newspaper and subsequent book. Goldacre registered Henrietta with AANC to showcase the complete lack of any verification for membership, beyond payment of $60, after TV nutritionist Gillian McKeith promoted her AANC membership among other unverified qualifications.

=== Kitty O'Malley (high school diploma) ===
In 1973, the Lakeland, Florida newspaper The Ledger obtained a high school diploma from "Washington High Academy" for Kitty O'Malley, a cat also known as Spanky. While the diploma was deemed insufficient to gain Kitty admission to local colleges, the state attorney general's office planned to investigate the institution.

=== Oliver Greenhalgh (fellowship of estate valuation professional society) ===
On December 10, 1967, The Times reported that Oliver Greenhalgh had been accepted as a fellow of the English Association of Estate Agents and Valuers, after a payment of eleven guineas (his two references were not verified). Oliver was a cat belonging to Michael Greenhalgh, a cameraman with Television Wales and the West, who was pursuing an investigation of bogus professional associations.

=== Oreo Collins (high school diploma) ===
Oreo C. Collins (born around 2007) is a tuxedo cat who gained notoriety when she received a diploma from Jefferson High School Online in 2009, although her age was misrepresented in order to qualify. The sting was an investigative operation by the Better Business Bureau of Central Georgia headed by Kelvin Collins, Oreo's owner.

=== Zoe D. Katze (psychotherapist and hypnotherapy certifications) ===
Zoe D. Katze ("Zoe the Cat" in German) was a house cat owned by psychologist Steve K. D. Eichel. Around 2001, Eichel obtained a psychotherapy certification for his cat from the American Psychotherapy Association and several hypnotherapy credentials from other organizations. The certification of Zoe has been cited in several books and articles on credentialing scams, and has appeared in psychology and forensic curricula. Eichel also served as the consultant to the BBC investigation that led to the certification of George the cat by several UK hypnosis associations.

== Dogs ==
=== Chester Ludlow (MBA) ===
In 2009, Chester Ludlow, a pug from Vermont, was awarded an MBA by Rochville University. His owner submitted an application and US$499 and received a "diploma, two sets of transcripts, a certificate of distinction in finance, and a certificate of membership in the student council".

=== Lulu (college diploma) ===
In 2010, Mark Howard, a member of the legal team for the claimants (BSkyB) in BSkyB Ltd & Anor v HP Enterprise Services UK Ltd & Anor [2010] obtained a degree for his dog Lulu from Concordia College in the US Virgin Islands. Lulu "graduated" with higher marks than the defendant's key witness, who, the judge found, had lied that he had attended classes for his Concordia MBA. In the legal community, the story of the witness' MBA is described as "infamous", and a supervisory management cautionary tale.

=== Maxwell Sniffingwell (theriogenology/animal reproduction degree) ===
In 2009, Dr. Ben Mays, a veterinarian in Clinton, Arkansas, obtained a degree in "theriogenology/animal reproduction" from Belford University on behalf of an English bulldog named Maxwell Sniffingwell. The application included his work as a reproductive specialist, noting his "natural ability in theriogenology" and "experimental work with felines" and his understanding of the merits of specialization despite a desire to "'do them all'". He obtained a diploma, transcript and letter of recommendation upon receipt of a payment of $549 to the university, but declined an offer to be made an honors graduate for an additional $75.

=== Molly (high school diploma) ===
In February 2012, in a story on local diploma mills by Houston television station KHOU, the reporters got a high school diploma and official transcript from Lincoln Academy for their photographer's basset hound Molly for $300 after filling out a "laughable", "easy take-home test". According to a homeschooling advocate, Lincoln Academy and other schools were improperly taking advantage of a Texas law that prohibits discrimination by public colleges and universities against homeschooled students.

=== Ollie (associate editorship of medical journals) ===
In 2017, Professor Mike Daube, a public health expert in Western Australia, reinvented his dog Ollie as Dr. Olivia Doll. He made up credentials including "past associate of the Shenton Park Institute for Canine Refuge Studies" (where she was a rescue dog) and submitted her application for posts on the editorial boards of some predatory medical journals. Several accepted her application, and the Global Journal of Addiction and Rehabilitation Medicine named her associate editor.

=== Pete (MBA) ===
A diploma mill known as the American University of London offered Pete, a four-year-old male short-haired Lurcher in Battersea Dogs and Cats Home, London, an MBA for £4,500 without requiring any course work. The BBC current affairs programme Newsnight reported in 2013 that the dog, named "Peter Smith" on the faked CV for a management consultant, was offered an MBA by the university's Accreditation of Previous Experiential Learning board based on his "made-up work experience and a fictitious undergraduate degree" just four days after applying for the course.

=== Phoebe (professional certifications) ===
Between 2024 and 2026, a nine-year-old pug from Alberta, Canada, named Phoebe obtained more than 250 online professional and workplace certifications as part of a demonstration conducted by the Calgary-based firm Cognisense. Her certifications included workplace safety credentials, transportation of dangerous goods, defensive driving, boating, food handling, and Alberta’s ProServe Liquor Staff Training certificate. Media reports stated that several of the online courses required only basic registration and lacked identity verification or participation monitoring.

=== Sonny (medical degree) ===
The May 30, 2007 episode of the Australian Broadcasting Corporation comedy show The Chaser's War on Everything documented host Chas Licciardello applying online and obtaining a medical degree for his dog Sonny from the diploma mill Ashwood University. Sonny's "work experience" included "significant proctology experience sniffing other dogs' bums". Ashwood University has since been listed as a Non Accredited Degree Supplier in the states of Michigan, Oregon, and Texas.

=== Wally (associate's degrees) ===
In 2004, the Albany, New York television station WRGB ran a report in which reporter Peter Brancato applied to and received an associate degree from Almeda University on behalf of his dog, Wally. On the application, Brancato listed, "Plays with the kids every day ... teaches them to interact better with each other ... Teaches them responsibilities like feeding the dog." Almeda University granted Wally a "life experience" associate degree in "Childhood Development". After the report aired, Almeda University protested that Brancato perjured himself by creating a false identity using a fabricated name and date of birth. In a public statement, an Almeda University representative wrote, "He completed an application that included a background of the following: Eight-years tutoring pre-K children, curriculum design and development, teaching coping skills, and volunteer coaching". In March 2008, Wally was featured in a Lake Geneva, Wisconsin mayoral campaign political cartoon, with a dialogue bubble reading, "I graduated with Bill Chesen", referring to candidate Chesen's Almeda University bachelor's degree.

== Other ==
=== Algernon (goldfish) ===
In 2021, environmentalist George Monbiot registered his deceased childhood goldfish as a registered waste disposer in the UK.

== See also ==
- F.D.C. Willard, a cat in whose name scientific papers were published
- Myrtle the Parachick, a chicken and member of the British 1st Airborne Division during World War II
- List of animals in political office
- List of scholarly publishing stings
- List of unaccredited institutions of higher education
- Non-human electoral candidates
- Who's Who scam
- "Basic Crisis Room Decorum", an episode of the sitcom Community involving a dog purported to have been awarded a college degree
