= Breyer State University =

Unaccredited distance education institution

Breyer State Theology University
- Type: Unaccredited
- Established: 2001
- President: Thomas H. Schear
- Location: Panama
- Website: www.breyerstate.com

Breyer State Theology University, also called Breyer State University-Alabama, is an unaccredited distance education, for profit, private university that formerly operated in the U.S. states of Idaho and Alabama and now reports a location in Panama. It has been described by The New Republic magazine as a diploma mill that "claimed official-sounding accreditation to attract hundreds of people to obtain degrees". Breyer State University disputes this categorization.

== History ==
Breyer State originally incorporated in Kamiah, Idaho in 2001, but later incorporated in Alabama in 2004, as Breyer State University-Alabama.

In 2003, Breyer was described as a "conjoined twin" of James Monroe University. Breyer State's former president, Dominick L. Flarey, was also identified as president of James Monroe University.

In 2007, Breyer State reported that it had more than 120 contracted faculty. In 2008 the Alabama Community College System reported the finding that "many" of the faculty members' degrees "did not come from accredited institutions."

A July 2008 news release by the Alabama Community College System that announced an initiative to rid the state of fraudulent institutions stated that some of the closed institutions, "notably Columbus University and Breyer State University – were operating apparent diploma mills and taking shameful advantage of hundreds of unsuspecting students."

In March 2008 Breyer State's license to operate in Alabama expired. The Alabama Department of Postsecondary Education denied Breyer State's request for renewal of its license in June 2008 and then reported that the school had moved to Idaho. As of September 2010, its website displayed an address in Los Angeles, California at the bottom of each page. As of August 2012, the website lists an address in Panama.

== Programs ==
On its website, Breyer State describes its offerings as including bachelor, masters, doctoral, and associate degree programs in diverse fields, including business, psychology and various counseling specialties, education, law, and health care fields.

== Accreditation status ==
Breyer State is not accredited by any accreditation institution recognized by the United States Department of Education, The Oregon Office of Degree Authorization lists Breyer State University as one of the "unaccredited degree suppliers" whose degrees do not meet the state's requirements for use as credentials. The State of Michigan lists Breyer as unaccredited, nor is it a state institution. It is on the list of "Institutions Whose Degrees are Illegal to Use in Texas". It is also on the lists of unaccredited institutions maintained by Oregon, Maine, and Michigan.

In July 2008, the Asbury Park Press reported that the superintendent and two other administrators of the Freehold Regional High School District in central New Jersey had received tuition reimbursement for enrolling at Breyer State and had been given salary increases based on doctoral degrees issued by Breyer State University, described by the newspaper as "an unaccredited institution deemed an 'apparent diploma mill' by education officials in its home state of Alabama." This was stated to be a violation of a New Jersey law against the professional use of titles and degrees earned from unaccredited institutions. The superintendent stated that he did not intend to seek an accredited doctoral degree, but he planned to continue using the title "Dr." The superintendent had to be ordered to stop using the title "Doctor". The Education Commissioner then sent letters to the districts reminding educators that use of unaccredited degrees was illegal. It was reported in September 2009 that H. James Wasser would resign at the end of the school year. The episode led the New Jersey state legislature to enact a law preventing state tuition assistance from being used at non-accredited institutions.

== See also ==
- List of unaccredited institutions of higher learning
- List of unrecognized accreditation associations of higher learning
- Educational accreditation
