= World Online Education Accrediting Commission =

Educational accrediting organization

The World Online Education Accrediting Commission (WOEAC) is an entity with no identified geographic location that represents itself as an accrediting organization for online degree providers. It is not recognized as a higher education accreditor by either the United States Department of Education (USDE) or the Council for Higher Education Accreditation (CHEA).

WOEAC's website lists Ashwood University as an institution accredited by WOEAC. Ashwood has been identified as a diploma mill.

Council for Higher Education Accreditation has warned that “Accreditation” from an accreditation mill can mislead students and the public about the quality of an institution. In the presence of diploma mills and accreditation mills, students may spend a good deal of money and receive neither an education nor a useable [sic] credential.

== See also ==
- List of recognized accreditation associations of higher learning
- List of unrecognized accreditation associations of higher learning
- List of unaccredited institutions of higher learning
