= Ashwood University =

Diploma mill in Pakistan

Ashwood University is a diploma mill in Pakistan. It claims to award academic degrees based on "life experience." Ashwood University is not accredited by any recognised accreditation body. As such, its degrees may not be acceptable to employers or other institutions, and use of degree titles may be restricted or illegal in some jurisdictions.

== Recognition and accreditation status ==
The website "onlinelearning101" lists Ashwood University among examples of degree mills, and suggests that the name was selected because it "sounds like the very reputable Ashford University." Degree mills have been dubbed by John Bear, an ex-FBI consultant, as a "huge crime wave...and almost no one has noticed."

The Oregon State Office of Degree Authorization states that Oregon "has no evidence that this is an accredited or otherwise acceptable provider of postsecondary education meeting Oregon standards." The location of the organization's offices is not known with certainty; no address is given on the website or the whois record; a 2003 Usenet posting indicated that the company is based in a California strip mall, but all diplomas are mailed from Pakistan or Dubai, United Arab Emirates. It has been listed as a diploma mill by the American Association of Collegiate Registrars and Admissions Officers.

== Incidents of fraudulent degrees ==
In a 2008 article in the Chicago Tribune, a reporter described his experience obtaining a series of "bogus academic credentials" from Ashwood, including a "Doctorate Degree in Medicine & Surgery." He wrote: "All I have to do is persuade my editors to pay $699 'tuition,' including a $75 surcharge guaranteeing me a 4.0 grade-point average."

Several journalists and entertainers have publicized their experiences when they applied for and received bogus credentials from Ashwood in order to investigate its practices.

Television producer Tom Kenny won an Ohio Valley Regional Emmy Award (Service News Story - Consumer/Financial) in 2005 for his documentary on online diploma mills entitled, "Degrees of Deception." During his research for the documentary, Kenny bought a degree from Ashwood University; he chose a degree in aerospace engineering, a field he knew nothing about. The diploma he received had been sent from Pakistan.

In 2008, news media reported that the recipient of a doctorate degree from Ashwood University had resigned from her position with the Tacoma, Washington, school district amid an investigation into her use of that degree to obtain a promotion. School district officials said she had resigned due to personal issues. In 2010, the principal of Sir J. J. College of Architecture, Rajan Lakule resigned from his position as it was discovered that he had a doctorate degree from Ashwood University.

An Australian satirical TV program, The Chaser's War on Everything, reported receiving a medical diploma from Ashwood University in the name of a dog named Sonny. The diploma, displayed on the program, was issued one week after they paid 450 dollars. The presenters claim that in the "life experience" part of the application for the diploma, they listed "has eaten out of hospital rubbish bin for 5 years (35 dog years) ... has significant proctology experience sniffing other dog's bums." The academic transcript, reportedly given together with the diploma and shown on TV, listed that the dog received grades of A in "Immunology," "Zoo Preceptorship," and "Medical Bacteriology" and an A− grade in "Oral Communication and Presentation Skills."

In 2012, the Serbian magazine Novi magazin reported the discovery that the dean of the Faculty of Medicine of the University of Niš claimed a degree in medicine from Ashwood University, whose degrees it described as "worthless".

== Connections ==
Affordable Degrees (affordabledegrees.com), Belford University, Rochville University, and Speedy Degrees (speedydegrees.com), are operated by the same people. Other sources link speedydegrees.com to Ashwood University.

The World Online Education Accrediting Commission (WOEAC), which lists this particular university as accredited, is itself not recognized or accredited by the United States Department of Education or the Council for Higher Education Accreditation.

== See also ==
- List of unaccredited institutions of higher learning
