= Accrediting Commission International =

American accreditation mill

- Formation: 1989
- Type: Unrecognized higher education accreditor
- Location: Beebe, AR
- President: John F. Scheel
- Website: www.accreditnow.com

Accrediting Commission International (ACI), also known as Accrediting Commission International for Schools, Colleges, and Theological Seminaries, possibly associated with International Accrediting Commission (IAC), also known as International Accrediting Commission for Schools, Colleges and Theological Seminaries, is an unrecognized educational accreditation corporation in the United States. It primarily accredits religious schools, including seminaries and Bible colleges, and also offers accreditation to non-U.S. schools that offer business education programs. It is on a 2009 list of accreditation mills in College and University, the journal of the American Association of Collegiate Registrars and Admissions Officers.

== History ==
In 1982, International Accrediting Commission for Schools, Colleges, and Theological Seminaries (IAC) was established in Missouri. In October 1988, Missouri's Attorney General created a sting operation in which it set up the "Eastern Missouri Business College" with deliberately substandard faculty and curriculum for less than a week. An accreditation visit from the IAC resulted in civil fraud charges. IAC was ordered to pay the state of Missouri $15,0000 and cease operation in the state of Missouri in the fall of 1989.

ACI was established in 1989 in Beebe, Arkansas. It offered immediate acceptance to IAC members.

== Recognition ==
ACI is not recognized by the United States Department of Education, the institution responsible for recognizing educational accrediting institutions in the United States, or the Council for Higher Education Accreditation (CHEA). ACI says that credits from member schools may not be accepted by industry or non-member schools.

The Oregon Office of Degree Authorization includes ACI in its list of unrecognized accreditation agencies stating that, "any so-called 'accreditation' by these bodies is meaningless in Oregon and in some other states." In 2007, the St. Petersburg Times quoted Alan Contreras, the leader of Oregon's Office of Degree Authorization (an organization that follows questionable accrediting agencies) as saying, "Anything accredited by ACI in Beebe, Ark., is either fake or substandard, as far as I know."

In 2017, a spokesman for the South Carolina Department of Education said that a diploma issued by Georgia-based, ACI-accredited Cornerstone Christian Correspondence School did not appear to meet South Carolina's diploma-issuing criteria.

In 2019, Ashley Moody, Florida Attorney General began proceedings against ACI-accredited Ellenwood Academy after multiple complaints of diplomas not being accepted by employers or the State University System of Florida. The organization employed no faculty and offered an "accredited online high school diploma"; it charged $195 and used an online multiple choice test which could be taken until a passing grade was achieved.

== See also ==
- List of unaccredited institutions of higher education
- List of unrecognized higher education accreditation organizations
