= University Degree Program =

1990s diploma mill consortium

University Degree Program (UDP) is or was an unaccredited consortium of diploma mills run by Americans Jason and Caroline Abraham (of Brooklyn, New York; also known by their Hebrew names Yaakov and Chaya Rochel) beginning in the 1990s. In 2004, The Chronicle of Higher Education called UDP the "granddaddy" of diploma mill operations.

== Operations ==
The Chronicle of Higher Education reported that the University Degree Program recruited "students" over the telephone from call centers in Romania (where the call center also sold fake international driver's licenses) and Israel. Telephone salespeople, who were paid on commission and received performance-based bonuses, could offer degrees in any field requested. The Abrahams created websites for a diverse variety of bogus institutions whose names were printed on diplomas. Customers were not told which of these "universities" would issue their degrees. According to the Chronicle, UDP sent a letter to customers stating: "The policy of not disclosing the name of the University protects you against unscrupulous individuals who do not approve of self-study and lifestyle improvement." The letter also said that this was done to avoid "bad publicity".

The operation was estimated to have sold more than 30,000 "degrees" and received proceeds totaling $50 million to $100 million or more.

Early in 2003 the United States Federal Trade Commission (FTC) and British government authorities took action against UDP and related businesses, including the illegal sale of fake international driver's licenses. The FTC filed a preliminary injunction in January 2003 and amended complaints in February and May 2003. In May the FTC and Israeli government authorities shut down the call center operation in the Mea Shearim section of Jerusalem. The FTC complaint cited "deceptive acts or practices in or affecting commerce". The Abrahams "turned over $100,000 in profits" and promised to stop selling degrees.

In 2004, however, the Chronicle reported that email advertising "remarkably similar" to UDP's and phone solicitations using a "nearly identical" script had continued after that agreement, leading observers to think that the UDP or the Abrahams were still operating diploma mills. The Oregon Office of Degree Authorization observed that some websites that appeared to be University Degree Program "products (or clones)" remained in operation.

In 2009, it was listed as a diploma mill by the American Association of Collegiate Registrars and Admissions Officers.

== Entities associated with UDP ==
=== Institutions ===
The following are institutions connected to UDP.

- Ashford University (London) (not to be confused with Ashford University of Iowa)
- Brentwick University
- Glencullen University
- Harrington University
- Hartford University not to be confused with the University of Hartford in Connecticut. As of 2012, the Oregon Office of Degree Authorization stated that organizations using the "Hartford University" name were operating from the South Pacific island of Vanuatu and Washington, D.C.
- Hartley University
- Kingsfield University
- Landford University
- Northfield University
- Oaklands University
- Parkhurst University
- Parkwood University
- Shaftesbury University
- Shelbourne University
- Shepperton University
- Stafford University
- Summerset University
- Thornewood University
- University of Bedford
- University of Devonshire
- University of Dorchester
- University of Dunham
- University of Hampshire
- University of Palmers Green
- University of San Moritz
- University of Wexford
- Westbourne University
- Westhampton University

=== Accreditors ===
The following are unrecognized accreditation associations of higher learning connected to UDP.

- Distance Learning Council of Europe (DLCE: accrediting)
- European Council for Distance & Open Learning (ECDOL: accrediting)
- European Committee for Home and Online Education (ECHOE: accrediting))

=== Websites shut down by the FTC ===
The following are websites used by the UDP that were closed by the Federal Trade Commission.

- www.ashforduniversity.org (domain for Ashford University)
- www.brentwickuniversity.org (domain for Brentwick University)
- www.henryheston.com.cnchost.com (domain containing sites for the University of Devonshire, Glencullen University, Harrington University, and Shelbourne University)
- www.kingsfielduniversity.org (domain for Kingsfield University)
- www.landforduniversity.org (domain for Landford University)
- www.parkwooduniversity.org (domain for Parkwood University)
- www.thornewooduniversity.org (domain for Thornewood University)
- www.universityofwexford.org (domain for the University of Wexford)
- www.westbourneuniversity.org (domain for Westbourne University)

== People with UDP degrees ==
- Perry Beale, who was convicted of defrauding hospitals in Virginia by representing himself as a medical physicist, claimed to hold graduate degrees from the University of San Moritz
- Leonard Ingram (AKA "Bhagwan Ra Afrika"), a self-proclaimed anger management specialist, claims a PhD in philosophy from Glencullen University. Ingram has written several books and appeared on season five of Penn & Teller: Bullshit! in the episode entitled "Anger Management".
- Kostas S. Margaritis (Κώστας Σ. Μαργαρίτης), Greek politician, member of New Democracy (Greece) lists a degree from Shelbourne University.
- In 2005 a Pennsylvania children's mental health counselor, Leon Shal, was charged with several counts of fraud in connection with his use of a Shaftesbury University bachelor's degree to obtain employment. A state investigation reported that the institution was neither recognized nor accredited in the United Kingdom or the United States and that Shal's university diploma contained two misspellings. Shal avoided trial, but was placed in a pretrial diversion program.
- George Weah, President of Liberia and a retired Liberian football player, lists a degree from Parkwood University.
- Antoine Zahra, member of Lebanon's parliament affiliated with the Lebanese Forces and a candidate in the 2009 elections, claims a Diploma in Business Studies from the University of Harrington.
- Jim Mann, appointed by Governor of Kansas Sam Brownback as the Chief Information Technology Officer of the State of Kansas on October 31, 2011, claims a degree in Business Administration from the University of Devonshire. Mann subsequently resigned the post on November 7, 2011, after questions about his credentials were published.

== See also ==
- Accreditation mill
- Diploma mill
- Educational accreditation
- List of unaccredited institutions of higher learning
- List of unrecognized accreditation associations of higher learning
- Operation Dipscam
