= Suffield University =

American forprofit Internet school

- Type: Unaccredited distance education
- Website: suffield-university.com

The subject of this article should not be confused with Sheffield University (formally the University of Sheffield) or Suffolk University

Suffield University (sometimes referred to as Suffield College and University) is an unaccredited internet school specializing in what it calls Life Experience Degrees, issued upon payment, with life experience assessment based on the word of the applicant. Suffield is not accredited by any accreditation body recognized by its country. According to the US Department of Education, unaccredited degrees and credits might not be acceptable to employers or other institutions, and use of degree titles may be restricted or illegal in some jurisdictions.

Offering degrees for a fixed fee based on life experience is generally considered to be indicative of the institution being a diploma mill, and Suffield has been identified as such. In 2003, an article in The New Republic noted that in 2002 a fire department training commander had been "caught" with a degree in fire science from Suffield. The magazine described the university as a diploma mill "accredited" by "the bogus National Distance Learning Accreditation Council". In 2004 an Indiana state board denied a firefighter's request to use a Suffield degree as a job qualification, stating that the institution "apparently ... is not a college" but rather a body that provides a transcript in exchange for a fee. In 2004, one candidate's Suffield degree became an issue in the election campaign for mayor of South Milwaukee, Wisconsin, when the incumbent told voters that his opponent's master's degree came from an unaccredited school offering life experience degrees for $500.

In 2004 the Hartford Courant reported that state authorities in Connecticut had ordered Suffield to cease operations. The states of Oregon, Texas, and Maine have listed Suffield University as "operating illegally in Connecticut". As of January 2014, an institution calling itself Suffield University is using the website domain suffield-university.com, which does not identify a geographic location.

The person behind Suffield is also responsible for other unaccredited universities such as Redding University, Glendale University, Greenwood University and Bryson University.

== See also ==
- Accreditation mill
- List of unaccredited institutions of higher learning
- List of unrecognized accreditation associations of higher learning
