= Predatory educator =

A predatory educator is an organization that exploits people by selling them education that cannot live up to the promises made.

In many cases predatory educators are most expert at helping students access various forms of financial aid – helping them complete paperwork that will free up financial assistance that will allow the student to purchase more education. In the US it is common for such schools to get as much as 90% of their revenue from federal student aid programs.

== Comparison with diploma mills ==
Predatory educators are different from what are commonly known as diploma mills. Strictly speaking the term diploma mill is most commonly used to describe an entity that issues counterfeit diplomas bearing the names of real universities.

== Comparison with degree mills ==
A degree mill issues diplomas from unaccredited institutions which may be legal in some states but are generally illegitimate. This is not the case with predatory educators who generally are accredited and typically rely on that accreditation to access government funding.

== Legislation ==
Predatory educators are often enabled by government programs designed to provide students with access to paid education. In the US for example the 1998 $3.1 billion Workforce Investment Act provides students with vouchers worth $3,000 to $5,000 to help them acquire training. Although it is a federal program state and local officials decide what schools and programs are eligible to receive the funds, and have been criticized for not providing adequate oversight.

The Obama administration attempted protecting students by forcing colleges to disclose the information required to help students make good decisions, and enforcing performance by limiting access to government funds:

=== Certification requirements ===
Institutions must certify that each of their gainful employment programs meets applicable institutional or program-level accreditation requirements and state or federal licensure standards.

=== Accountability metrics ===
To maintain Title IV eligibility, gainful employment programs will be required to meet minimum standards measured by two metrics: debt-to-earnings and program cohort default rate. A program becomes ineligible to provide Title IV aid for 3 years if it fails in any 2 out of 3 consecutive years

OR

It is in the zone (or a combination of being in the zone and failing) for 4 consecutive years. A program becomes ineligible to provide Title IV aid for 3 years if it fails for 3 consecutive years.

=== Disclosures ===
Institutions will be required to make public disclosures regarding the performance and outcomes of their gainful employment programs. The disclosures include information on costs, earnings, debt, default rates, and completion rates.

=== American Bar Association ===
The American Bar Association requires accredited American law schools to disclose the "employment outcomes" of graduates.
