= Lafayette University =

Lafayette University may mean:

- Lafayette College, a private liberal arts college in Easton, Pennsylvania, USA
- University of Louisiana at Lafayette
- Lafayette University, also known as Notre Dame de Lafayette University, a degree mill identified in Operation Dipscam
