= Doctor of Metaphysics =

Unaccredited academic degree

- Acronym: DMETA
- Type: Postgraduate education; Unaccredited degree

A Doctor of Metaphysics, also called a Metaphysical Science Doctorate, is a purported academic degree. While mainstream universities teach metaphysics as a branch of philosophy, the Doctor of Metaphysics degree is offered by a number of unaccredited universities and degree mills as a religious-based degree. It is not recognized by the United States Department of Education as a legitimate degree, and is not offered by any accredited institution.

In the United States, Doctor of Metaphysics degrees are offered by purported religious institutions of learning, as well as unrecognised churches and colleges of metaphysics. In 1938 the United States Department of the Interior published a book listing the "Doctor of Metaphysics" degree in a section written by Walton C. John, titled "Counterfeit Degrees".

A 1960 American Psychologist article titled, "Mail-order training in psychotherapy," warned against unaccredited schools purporting to offer "training in a variety of psychological and metapsychological methods" and awarding a Doctor of Metaphysics degree.

In the field of social work there are counselors who claim the title "Doctor of Metaphysics". In 2019, the Journal of Social Work Education published "Predatory Doctoral Programs: Warnings for Social Workers". The article warned that the majority of doctoral programs in metaphysics are little more than diploma mills which have few requirements other than payments.

== See also ==
- Degrees offered by unaccredited institutions of higher education
- History of higher education in the United States
- List of fields of doctoral studies in the United States
- List of unaccredited institutions of higher education
