= Antoine Moussa Zahra =

Lebanese politician (born 1956)

Antoine Zahra (Arabic: أنطوان زهرا, also أنطوان زهرة, born 1956) is a Lebanese Maronite politician and a member of the executive committee of the Lebanese Forces party. He has been an MP in the Lebanese Parliament as a representative of Batroun district since the 2005 legislative elections. He got re-elected in the 2009 legislative elections. He is married to Dima Younan and they have one daughter.

== Early life and career ==
Antoine Moussa Zahra was born in 1956 to a Lebanese Maronite family in Kfifan, Batroun. He attended Batroun High School and the National Institute in Chekka. He was the head of Youth Union in Kfifane in the early 70's. He claims to have a Diploma in Business Studies from the University of Harrington, although this institution is an unaccredited diploma mill. In 1992, he moved to the United Arab Emirates to preside over "Zahra Company for Marketing and Advertising". He currently serves as executive director of Solo Gulf in Dubai and Solo Congo in Kinshasa. He was the president of the Lebanese Youth Sports Federation in the UAE in 2001.

== Political background ==
Zahra started his political career in the Kataeb Party as a student member. He was appointed by the LF party in Paris as the coordinator of the Lebanese Diaspora affairs in Western Europe from 1986 to 1988. He was the head of Kataeb office in his hometown Kfifane from 1988 to 1991. In 1991, he served as a member on the board of the LF party in Batroun. He was elected on June 19, 2005, as an MP for Batroun. Zahra is a member of the Lebanese Parliament Committees on Foreign Relations and Displaced Populations. He is also a member of the Lebanese Maronite League and the MPs committee of the March 14 Alliance.

Antoine Zahra remains the only Lebanese MP to have ever made a public evaluation of his first year in the parliament. He held a press conference on June 25, 2006, in which he listed the achievements of his election promise.

== See also ==
- Lebanese Forces
- List of Lebanese Forces Deputies in the Lebanese Parliament
