= Belford University =

Fraudulent higher education provider

Belford University was an organization that offered online unaccredited degrees for "life experience". The organization maintained a post office box in Humble, Texas, but its certificates were mailed from the United Arab Emirates. Along with many similar websites, it was owned by the Karachi-based company Axact, the main business of which, according to an investigation by The New York Times, is "to take the centuries-old scam of selling fake academic degrees and turn it into an Internet-era scheme on a global scale". In July 2018, Shoaib Ahmed Sheikh, the CEO of Axact was arrested and sentenced to prison for 20 years for his role in perpetuating this scam.

On August 31, 2012, Belford University was shut down and its alleged founder, Salem Kureshi, "ordered to pay $22.7 million in damages". "The judgment established the truth of allegations that Belford High School and Belford University are fake schools that do not actually exist." Court documents from McClusley v. Belford University revealed that Belford University was run by 30-year-old Salem Kureshi from his apartment in Karachi, Pakistan. The court found that Kureshi "operates a sophisticated internet ripoff scheme through various websites, which falsely represent the existence of an accredited and legitimate high school, whose diplomas will be widely accepted by employers, professional associations, other schools, colleges and universities". Kureshi has admitted that he created 44 online universities and more than 100 promotional websites. "With an inkjet printer, a Microsoft Word template, and a few cheap websites, Kureshi allegedly became an overnight millionaire."

== Accreditation status ==
The school was not accredited by any accrediting agency recognized by the United States Department of Education (USDE) or the Council on Higher Education Accreditation (CHEA). Neither of the organizations from which Belford claimed accreditation, the International Accreditation Agency for Online Universities (IAAOU) and the Universal Council for Online Education Accreditation (UCOEA), are recognized accreditation associations of higher learning. Without recognized accreditation, Belford's degrees and credits might not be acceptable to employers or other academic institutions, and use of degree titles may be restricted or illegal in some jurisdictions. Jurisdictions that have restricted or prohibited the use of credentials from unaccredited schools include South Korea and the US states of Oregon, Michigan, Maine, North Dakota, New Jersey, Washington, Nevada, Illinois, Indiana and Texas. Many other states are also considering restrictions on the use of degrees from unaccredited institutions. It has been listed as a diploma mill by the American Association of Collegiate Registrars and Admissions Officers.

== Controversy and criticism ==
A 2005 investigative report on WHEC-TV in Rochester, New York, characterized Belford as "just one of hundreds of diploma mills easily accessible online".

According to David Linkletter of the Texas Higher Education Coordinating Board, Belford "is not a legitimate institute of higher education. No legitimate university offers a complete degree on the basis of one's life experience. I particularly like the 'order now' button on their Web site, which is another clue... To the extent that Belford University is in Texas, it is operating in violation of the Texas Education Code." Furthermore, the Texas Higher Education Coordinating Board has indicated that Belford, Rochville University, as well as the agencies from which they claim accreditation, "appear to be operated by the same people".

In a 2007 article, a Yale Daily News journalist reported that he had applied for a doctorate with what he described as a brief paltry life experience justification, and was approved for his requested degree 12 hours later. He said that the basic price for a doctorate was $549 and entitled the recipient to a transcript showing a 3.0 grade point average. Latin honors could be obtained for an additional fee of $25 and Belford offered to back-date a degree for an additional $75 fee.

Several people with "degrees" from Belford have been severely penalized for attempting to use them to qualify for jobs or promotions. A fire chief was dismissed from his job for his Belford degree in 2006. Similarly, a faculty member at Pensacola State College was dismissed in January 2011 for "present[ing] college administrators with an unaccredited master's degree from an online diploma mill that he obtained while on a paid sabbatical". In 2008, a candidate for sheriff in Mahoning County, Ohio, was removed from the ballot after the Supreme Court of Ohio determined that his associate's degree from Belford could not be used to satisfy the state's requirement that a sheriff have at least two years of post-secondary education.

Dr. Ben Mays, a veterinarian in Clinton, Arkansas, successfully received a diploma accrediting his dog as Dr. Maxwell Sniffingwell, partially in criticism of Arkansas politician John Rhoda, who himself had received a diploma from the university.

Ahmad Tavakoli, a member of Iran's parliament, has made allegations that the vice president of Iran, Mohammad Reza Rahimi, holds a fraudulent Ph.D. degree from Belford University. Tavakoli has published documents on his website purporting to show fraudulent documents created by Rahimi.

Salem Kureshi, the owner of Belford University and Belford High School, agreed to a default judgment against him and his companies in a 2011 class-action lawsuit filed in a U.S. federal court; on June 19, 2012, the court held him in contempt for failing to comply with the terms of the judgment, including a $22.7 million payment.

== Belford High School ==
Belford High School was another one of Salem Kureshi's "websites, which falsely represented the existence of an accredited and legitimate high school". It was shut down, along with Belford University, on August 31, 2012.

== See also ==
- Accreditation mill
- List of unaccredited institutions of higher learning
- List of unrecognized higher education accreditation organizations
