= Louise Wightman =

American bodybuilder and erotic dancer

Louise Fitzgerald Wightman (née Johnson), also known as Lucy Wightman (born June 18, 1959) is an American former exotic dancer who performed in Boston and Providence during the 1970s and 1980s, using the stage name Princess Cheyenne. The juxtaposition of her education and class background with her career attracted media attention. In the spring of 2007, she again attracted public interest, this time for being convicted of being a practicing psychologist without a license in two South Shore Massachusetts communities. Since then she has worked as a writer, photographer, and blogger.

== Dance career ==
Wightman's dancing career began at age 17, when she was known as Lucy Johnson, and peaked when she was a headliner at the now defunct Naked i Cabaret in Boston's Combat Zone. "Princess Cheyenne" was a local legend in Boston. The Boston Herald would later call her "perhaps the most famous exotic dancer ever in this town." Sports columnist Bill Reynolds called her a "cult figure." Journalist Howard Altman, reminiscing about her in the Philadelphia City Paper, called her "Boston's favorite stripper." Although she is not named, Wightman is described in Lauri Lewin's Combat Zone memoir, Naked is the Best Disguise: My Life as a Stripper.

Using her celebrity from the exotic dancing circuit, Wightman later hosted a sex advice radio talk show called "Ask Princess Cheyenne" on Boston rock station WBCN, and posed for Playboy magazine (as Lucy Johnson) in March 1986. She competed in women's bodybuilding contests, winning the 1993 National Physique Committee Massachusetts championship and later being featured in the May–June 1996 issue of Women's Physique World.

=== "The thinking man's stripper" ===
As an articulate woman from a well-to-do family, Wightman did not conform to the popular stereotype of an exotic dancer, and gained a reputation as "the thinking man's stripper." A Boston Globe reporter, writing in 1979, called her "the valedictorian of strippers." The president of the Harvard Lampoon invited her to perform at a banquet in 1982, calling her "a nice and educated girl"; a few years later, a writer in Harvard Magazine noted with interest that Wightman, "one of the premier strippers" in the Combat Zone, was working her way through college. (The Naked i Cabaret, where Wightman performed, proudly advertised its "Totally Nude College Girls Revue.") In Women's Physique World she was described as "Lucy Wightman: 138 I.Q., 285 Bench!"

== Psychotherapy career ==
In 1985, Wightman received a Bachelor of Arts degree from Emerson College, and subsequently earned a master's degree in counseling psychology from Lesley University. She then enrolled at the Massachusetts School of Professional Psychology for five years, from 1996 to 2001. Wightman then withdrew from MSPP and submitted her credits and hours to an online degree program to which she paid $1,299 to receive a doctorate in psychology from Concordia College and University, an online institution based in Dominica that is not recognized for licensure by the Commonwealth of Massachusetts. During this same period, Wightman founded South Shore Psychology Associates, and began treating patients with psychotherapy in her Norwell office.

== Legal problems ==
In October 2005, Wightman was indicted in Boston, Massachusetts for practicing psychology without a license, filing false health care claims, and engaging in insurance fraud after local FOX affiliate WFXT did an undercover investigation into her therapy practice. Under unusual provisions of Massachusetts law, Wightman had been allowed to practice as a psychotherapist, not as a psychologist. In the indictment, the Commonwealth charged that she never applied for or received a license to practice as a psychologist in Massachusetts, which requires a doctoral degree in psychology from a state-approved program. Wightman was found guilty of 19 of 26 counts and sentenced to six months in jail and five years probation. The six-month sentence was suspended, sparing her prison time. Under the terms of her probation, she was sentenced to one year of home confinement, and was barred from practicing as a psychotherapist for her entire probationary period.

== Personal life ==
In 1979, Wightman was engaged to the singer Cat Stevens, but the couple broke up due to her career commitments and his conversion to Islam.

After the breakup with Stevens, Wightman married and divorced twice; she had a daughter named Victoria (Torri) with her second husband Donald Wightman, a Boston police detective and head of security for the rock band Aerosmith. On May 16, 2006, 16-year-old Torri died as result of injuries sustained in an automobile accident in Plympton, Massachusetts.

Wightman is the author of the 2025 memoir Princess Cheyenne.

== See also ==
- List of unaccredited institutions of higher learning
- Diploma mill
