= List of unrecognized higher education accreditation organizations =

This is a list of unrecognized higher education accreditation organizations, as identified by the organizations themselves, government authorities in their respective countries, or other independent authorities. This article includes entities that are engaged in higher education accreditation or have been identified as being accreditors, but which lack appropriate recognition or authorization.

Prerequisites and rules for higher education accreditation vary from country to country. In most countries, the function of quality assurance for higher education institutions is conducted by a government ministry of education. However in the United States, educational accreditation is performed primarily by private nonprofit membership associations, the legitimacy of which is validated through recognition by the United States Department of Education (USDE), the Council for Higher Education Accreditation (CHEA), or both. USDE and CHEA recognize many of the independent accrediting organizations, but not all. Accreditors seek USDE or CHEA recognition for different reasons; for example, USDE recognition is required for accreditors whose institutions or programs seek eligibility for federal student aid funds. CHEA recognition confers an academic legitimacy on accrediting organizations, helping to solidify the place of these organizations and their institutions and programs in the national higher education community.

Often, a school relying on accreditation from an unrecognized accrediting body will not be viewed as legitimate in the academic community. Institutional accreditation is usually required by US institutions to receive federal government funds. Also, students who attend institutions of higher education that are accredited through organizations not recognized by the USDE or CHEA do not qualify for US government financial aid. Similarly, employers or graduate programs cannot be confident that graduates of an unaccredited institution or program will be appropriately prepared.

To assist education consumers, several national and international bodies publish lists of recognized accreditation bodies and accredited educational institutions, as well as lists of other accreditors that are known to lack the necessary legal authority or recognition, and higher education providers known to lack accreditation. The United States organization CHEA maintains an international directory of education ministries and other recognized higher education quality assurance bodies worldwide. The 2007 version of that directory lists 467 recognized bodies in 175 countries.

Some, but not all, of the entities in the list below are considered to be fraudulent accreditation mills that were set up to help diploma mills lure students and whose "accreditation" has no legal or academic value. Some diploma and degree mills have played a role in creating these accrediting bodies as well. These diploma and degree mills may further confuse matters by claiming to consider work history, professional education, or previous learning, and may even require the submission of a purported dissertation or thesis, in order to give an added appearance of legitimacy. Some other listed entities are religious accreditation bodies, whose accreditation may have doctrinal significance but lacks recognized academic value.

Also included are some organizations that do not offer educational accreditation but have been falsely identified as accrediting bodies by organizations that claim to have been accredited by them. A notable example of this last type is UNESCO, which does not have authority to recognize or accredit higher education institutions or agencies. Nonetheless, because diploma mills have claimed false UNESCO accreditation, UNESCO itself has published warnings against education organizations that claim UNESCO recognition or affiliation.

== A ==
- Academy for Contemporary Research
- Academy for the Promotion of International Culture and Scientific Exchange (APICS) or Akademie für Internationale Kultur und Wissenschaftförderung, Switzerland, Hawaii; accreditor of Monticello University, also associated with La Jolla University and Irish International University
- Accelerated Degree Programs
- Accreditation Agency for European Non-Traditional Universities, Ireland, New York; accreditor of Ballmore Irish University
- Accreditation Association of Ametrican [sic] College [sic] and Universities; accredited the American University of Hawaii
- Accreditation Association of Christian Colleges and Seminaries, Morgantown, Kentucky
- Accreditation Council for Distance Education
- Accreditation Council for International Education
- Accreditation Council for Online Academia
- Accrediting Council for Independent Colleges and Schools
- Accreditation Council on Medical Denturity
- Accreditation Distance Education Council
- Accreditation Governing Commission of the United States of America
- Accreditation Panel for Online Colleges and Universities
- Accredited Universities of Sovereign Nations from their own website: "We are not affiliated with any government, any industry, any sovereign nation, nor any political or religious ideology — our seal of accreditation is one of independence and international excellence." (affiliated with American University of Sovereign Nations)
- Accrediting Association of Christian Colleges and Seminaries, Sarasota, Florida
- Accrediting Commission for Specialized Colleges, Gas City, Indiana
- Accrediting Commission International (ACI) (formerly in Beebe, Arkansas, now in Sarasota, Florida) (aka International Accrediting Commission)
- Accrediting Commission International for Schools, Colleges, and Theological Seminaries (ACI) (in Beebe, Arkansas) (aka Accrediting Commission International)
- Accrediting Commission of Independent Colleges and Schools, Bald Knob, Kentucky
- Accrediting Commission of International Colleges and Universities (ACICU)
- Accrediting Council for Colleges and Schools (ACCS)
- Adult Higher Education Alliance (AHEA)
- Advanced Online Business Education Society
- Agency of International Education
- AF Sep, accreditor claimed by Beta International University
- Alternative Institution Accrediting Association (AIAA), Washington, DC
- American Accrediting Association of Theological Institutions (AATI) (in Rocky Mount, North Carolina)
- American Association for Adult and Continuing Education (AAACE)
- American Association for Higher Education and Accreditation (AAHEA) Based in Ocala, Florida, but uses the name and Washington, DC telephone number of another organization that was defunct in 2009.
- American Association of Accredited Private Schools (AAPS)
- American Association of Drugless Practitioners Commission on Accreditation (AADPCA); also known as American Alternative Medical Association
- American Association of Independent Collegiate Schools of Business
- American Association of International Medical Graduates (AAIMG)
- American Association of Non-traditional Colleges and Universities (AANCU)
- American Association of Non-Traditional Private Postsecondary Education
- American Association of Schools (AAS)
- American Association of Universities and Colleges (AAUC)
- American Board of Higher Education Commission (ABHEC)
- American Bureau of Higher Education (ABHE)
- American Communication Association (ACA)
- American Council of Private Colleges and Universities (ACPCU) (connected to the operator of Hamilton University, now called Richardson University)
- American Council on Private School Accreditation (ACPSA)
- American Education Association for the Accreditation of Schools, Colleges & Universities
- American Federation of Colleges and Schools (AFCS)
- American Federation of Colleges and Seminaries(AmFed)(AFCS) or American Federation of Christian Colleges and Schools (in Lakeland, Florida)
- American Naturopathic Certification Board (ANCB)
- American Naturopathic Medical Accreditation Board (ANMAB)
- American Naturopathic Medical Certification and Accreditation Board (ANMCAB or ANMAB)
- American Naturopathic Medicine Association (ANMA)
- American Psychotherapy Association
- American Universities Admission Program
- American University Accreditation Council (connected to the operator of the University of Northern Virginia)
- Arizona Commission of Non-Traditional Private Postsecondary Education
- Asia Theological Association (ATA)
- Association of Accredited Schools of Business International Link to the accreditation mill
- Association for Comprehensive Energy Psychology (ACEP)
- Association for Distance Learning Programs (ADLP)(aka National Academy of Higher Education and Association of Distance Learning Programs)
- Association for Innovation in Distance Education
- Association for Online Academic Excellence (AOAE) (may be based in Wales)
- Association for the Education and Guardianship of International Students (AEGIS)
- Association of Accredited Bible Schools
- Association of Accredited Private Schools
- Association of Career Training Schools
- Association of Christian Colleges and Theological Schools (in Louisiana or Virginia)
- Association of Distance Learning Programs (ADLP) (aka Association for Distance Learning and National Academy of Higher Education)
- Association of Independent Christian Colleges & Seminaries
- Association of International Education Assessors (includes Council for Distance Education Accreditation)
- Association to Advance Collegiate Schools of Business (AACSB)

== B ==
- Board of Online Universities Accreditation (BOUA)
- British Learning Association (BLA)
- British Public University System, claims authorization from British Honduras (which became Belize in 1981)

== C ==
- Central Orthodox Synod, claimed accreditor of International Reform University
- Central States Consortium of Colleges & Schools (CSCCS), Warren, Ohio
- Centre of Academic Excellence UK (CAEUK)
- Central States Council on Distance Education (CSCDE), (Washington, DC); alternatively named Central States Association Council on Distance Education
- Christ For The Nations Association of Bible Schools (CFNABS)
- Christian Accrediting Association (CAA)
- College for Professional Assessment
- Council for the Accreditation of Correspondence Schools
- Commission for the Accreditation of European Non-Traditional Universities
- Commission on Medical Denturitry Accreditation (COMDA)
- Commission on Online Higher Learning
- Confederation of International Accreditation Commission (CIAC) CIAC is registered in Delaware, USA as a private company, however, solely operates out of India and has no functional presence in the USA as it claims. Their Registered Office Address noted on the company's website is of the address of their company registration Agent. Therefore, evident that it is another fake degree accreditation agencies misleading public and regulators in India portraying it as an International organisation.
- Council for Distance Education Accreditation (CDEA), (connected to Association of International Education Assessors)
- Council for International Education Accreditation (CIEA)
- Council on Postsecondary Alternative Education
- Council on Postsecondary Christian Education – According to John Bear's list of unrecognized accreditors, this organization was established by the operators of LaSalle University (Louisiana) and Kent College (Louisiana).
- Council on Medical Denturitry Education (COMDE)

== D ==
- Distance Education Council (regis) (DEC) (connected to the operator of Saint Regis University) (not to be confused with the legitimate Distance Education Council recognized by the Indian Department of Education)
- Distance Education Council of America
- Distance Education and Training Council (UK, Cyprus) (detc.org.uk not to be confused with the legitimate detc.org)
- Distance Graduation Accrediting Association
- Distance Learning Council of Europe (DLCE) (connected to University Degree Program)

== E ==
- Education Accrediting Association (in Idaho)
- Educational Accreditation Association (in Idaho)
- Education Commission for Integrative Health (ECIH)
- Education International (Idaho), Post Falls, Idaho. Not to be confused with Education International, a global federation of unions.
- Education Quality Assurance Commission (EQAC)
- European Accreditation Board of Higher Education Schools](in France, Belgium, and UK)
- European Committee for Home and Online Education (ECHOE) (connected to University Degree Program)
- European Council for Distance and Open Learning (ECDOE) (connected to University Degree Program)
- Examining Board of Natural Medicine Practitioners (EBNMP)
- Expressive Psychology Association

== G ==
- Global Accreditation Board for Distance Learning
- Global Accreditation Commission (GAC)
- Government Accreditation Association of Delaware

== H ==
- Higher Education Accreditation Commission (HEAC)
- Higher Education Services Association (HESA) (connected to University Consulting Inc. and University Degree Program)
- Hygienic Doctors Association (HDA)

== I ==
- International Accreditation Council for Business Studies (IACBS) - IACBS since 1991, does not exist
- Innovation University of Silicon Valley recently founded (2015), office located in California
- Integra Accreditation Association (IAA)
- Inter-Collegiate Joint Committee on Academic Standards (ICJCAS)
- Interfaith Education Ministries (IEM)
- International Academic Accrediting Commission (IAAC)
- International Accreditation Agency for Online Universities (IAAOU) (connected to operators of Ashwood University, Belford University, and Rochville University)
- International Accreditation for Universities, Colleges and Institutes (IAUCI)
- International Accreditation and Recognition Council (IARC)
- International Accrediting Association for Colleges and Universities (IAACU)
- International Accrediting Commission (IAC) (Kenosha, Wisconsin) (aka Accrediting Commission International)
- International Accrediting Commission for Schools, Colleges, and Theological Seminaries (IAC) (aka International Accrediting Commission)
- International Accrediting Commission for Postsecondary Institutions (IACPI)
- International Accrediting Commission for Postsecondary Education Institutions
- International Association for Distance Learning (IADL) - IADL states that it does not accredit institutions unless they "are licensed or approved by national or regional government or are already accredited by a nationally or internationally recognised organisation or body" and that it has no government affiliation, but IADL has been claimed as an accreditor by institutions lacking standard licensing, approval or accreditation.
- International Accreditation Organisation
- International Association of Bible Colleges and Seminaries (IABCS) a proposed name for Southern Accrediting Association of Bible Colleges, Institutes and Seminaries. Southern Accrediting Association of Bible Colleges, Institutes and Seminaries (which is also named Southern Accrediting Association of Bible Colleges and Seminaries and Southern Accrediting Association of Bible Colleges) did not also become accredited.
- International Association for Theological Accreditation (IATA)
- International Association of Educators for World Peace
- International Association of Universities and Schools (IAUS) (not to be confused with the International Association of Universities (IAU))
- International Association for Biblical Education (IABE)
- International Commission for Higher Education (ICHE)
- International Commission of Open Post Secondary Education (ICOPSE)
- International Commission on Distance Learning,
- International Distance Education and Learning Council (IDETC) (not to be confused with the US-recognized Distance Education and Training Council (DETC))
- International Distance Learning Accrediting Association (IDLAA)
- International Education Ministry of Accreditation Association
- International Interfaith Accreditation Association (IIAA) (Closing down operations at the end of May 2007)
- International Parliament for Safety and Peace (IPSP), operating from Italy
- International University Accrediting Association (IUAA) (in California)

== K ==
- Kingdom Fellowship of Christian Schools and Colleges

== M ==
- Middle States Accrediting Board (MSAB)
- Mid States Accrediting Agency
- Midwestern States Accreditation Agency (MSAA)

== N ==
- National Academy of Higher Education (NAHE)
- National Academy of Higher Learning
- National Accreditation Association (NAA)
- National Accrediting Agency of Private Theological Institutions (NAAPTI). Grimesland, North Carolina.
- National Association for Private Post-Secondary Education (NAPSE)
- National Association for the Legal Support of Alternative Schools (NALSAS)
- Nations Association for Theological Accreditation (NATA)
- National Association of Alternative Schools and Colleges (NAASC)
- National Association of Open Campus Colleges (NAOCC)
- National Association of Private Nontraditional Schools and Colleges (NAPNSC), (Grand Junction, Colorado)
- National Board of Education of Liberia
- National Commission on Higher Education (NCHE)
- National Council of Schools and Colleges (NCSC)
- National Distance Learning Accreditation Council (NDLAC) (Glendale University and Suffield University claim NDLAC accreditation)
- National Learning Online Council (NLOC)
- Naturopathic National Council (NNC)
- North American Distance Learning Association (NADLA)
- Northwest Regional Accrediting Agency

== P ==
- Pacific Association of Schools and Colleges (PASC)
- Private World Association of Universities and Colleges
- Professional Board of Education, West Lebanon, New Hampshire

== Q ==
- Quality Assurance Commission UK (QAC-UK); not to be confused with Quality Assurance Agency for Higher Education (QAA)

== R ==
- Regional Education Accreditation Commission (REDAC)
- Revans University (also known as the University of Action Learning)

== S ==
- Society of Academic Recognition
- Southern Accrediting Association of Bible Colleges and Seminaries
- Southern Accrediting Association of Bible Institutes and Colleges (SAABIC)
- Southern Accrediting Association of Christian Schools, Colleges, and Seminaries, Milton, Florida
- Southern Association of Accredited Colleges and Universities
- Southern Cross International Association of Colleges and Schools
- Southwestern Association of Christian Colleges

== T ==
- The Association for Online Distance Learning (TAODL)
- Transworld Accrediting Commission International (TWACI), Riverside, California, USA

== U ==
- UNESCO (UNESCO states that they do not have the power to accredit any higher education institutions or agencies; as a consequence, institutions or agencies claiming to be recognized by UNESCO should be looked upon with suspicion)
- United Congress of Colleges (UCC) (Ireland, UK)
- University of Action Learning (UAL) (Port Vila, Vanuatu)
- US-DETC—Nevada (not to be confused with the legitimate Distance Education and Training Council (DETC), based in Washington DC)
- United States Distance Learning Association (USDLA); posted on the Michigan list, but website does not claim to provide accreditation
- Universal Council for Online Education Accreditation (UCOEA)

== V ==
- Verity College (Illinois, Michigan)
- Virtual University Accrediting Association (VUAA)
- Virtual University Accrediting Association (in California) (VUAA)
- Virtuous Universal Accreditation Commission

== W ==
- West European Accrediting Society (WEAS)
- Western Accrediting Agency
- Western Association of Private Alternative Schools (WAPAS)
- Western Council on Non-Traditional Private Post Secondary Education (WCNPPSE)
- World Association for Online Education (WAOE)
- World Association of Universities and Colleges (WAUC) (in Nevada; operated by Maxine Asher)
- World Conference of Associations of Theological Institutions
- World Council For Excellence in Higher Education (WCEHE)
- World Online Education Accrediting Commission (WOEAC)
- World-wide Accreditation Commission of Christian Educational Institutions (WACCEI)
- Worldwide Accrediting Commission

== See also ==
- List of recognized higher education accreditation organizations
- List of unaccredited institutions of higher learning
