= Unaccredited institutions of higher education =

Educational institutions without formal accreditation

Unaccredited institutions of higher education are colleges, trade schools, seminaries, and universities which do not have formal educational accreditation.

Educational institutions may not be legally required to obtain independent accreditation, depending on local laws. Academic degrees or other qualifications from such unaccredited institutions may or may not be accepted by civil service or other employers, depending on the local laws, the institution's reputation, and the industry standards.

An institution may not obtain or maintain accreditation for one of several reasons. As accreditation processes often require several years' work, a new institution may not yet have completed the initial accreditation process. A long-established institution may have lost accreditation due to financial difficulties or other factors. Other institutions (for example, some longstanding Bible colleges and seminaries) choose not to participate in the accreditation process because they view it as a government infringement of their religious, academic, or political freedom.

In some countries, unaccredited institutions are not allowed to exist legally. Therefore any such schools will fall under the label of fraudulent diploma or accreditation mills.

== Australia ==
In Australia, it is a criminal offence to use the term "university" or to purport to offer university degrees (Bachelors, Masters, Doctors) without government authorization. For government universities and some private institutions, this authorization is generally given in the form of an Act of a State or Federal Parliament, specifically referring to that institution. (Each state will recognize the institutions authorized under the law of the other states.)

Private institutions may apply to TEQSA for authorisation to offer recognised higher education diplomas and degrees.

Separate to this, there is also authorisation under the Higher Education Funding Act to receive federal government funds for students; this is a separate process from authorisation to grant degrees, so some institutions are entitled to grant degrees but not to receive government funds to do so.

There is also registration under CRICOS (the ESOS Act) - a student visa can only be issued to a student if they are studying at an institution with a valid CRICOS registration.

== India ==
According to the Indian Ministry of Education, regarding institutions without accreditation or an Act of Parliament, "It is emphasized that these fake institutions have no legal entity to call themselves as Universities (Hindi: विश्वविद्यालय) and to award ‘degrees’ which are not treated as valid for academic/employment purposes."

== Ireland ==
Legitimate higher education qualifications in Ireland are placed on, or formally aligned with, the National Framework of Qualifications. This framework was established by the National Qualifications Authority of Ireland in accordance with the Qualifications (Education and Training) Act (1999). It is illegal under the Universities Act (1997) for anybody offering higher education services to use the term "university" without the permission of the Minister for Education and Science. It is likewise illegal under the Institutes of Technologies Acts (1992–2006) to use the term "institute of technology" or "regional technical college" without permission.

== The Netherlands ==
Dutch academic titles are legally protected and can only be used by graduates from accredited Dutch institutions of higher education. Illegal use is considered a misdemeanor and subject to legal prosecution. Holders of foreign degrees need special permission before being able to use a recognised Dutch title, but they are free to use their own foreign title (untranslated).

== New Zealand ==
The New Zealand Education Act prohibits the use of the terms "degree" and "university" by institutions other than the country's eight accredited universities. In 2004 authorities announced their intention to take action against unaccredited schools using the words "degree" and "university," including the University of Newlands, an unaccredited distance-learning provider based in the Wellington suburb of Newlands. Other unaccredited New Zealand institutions reported to be using the word "university" included the New Zealand University of Golf in Auckland, the online Tawa-Linden and Tauranga Universities of the Third Age, and the Southern University of New Zealand. Newlands owner Rochelle M. Forrester said she would consider removing the word "university" from the name of her institution in order to comply with the law.

After the University of Newlands was listed as a "wannabe" or "degree mill" by The Australian newspaper, the institution was given permission by the New Zealand High Court to proceed to trial in its suit against the paper's publisher for defamation. The presiding judge noted that such degrees may be illegal and that purporting to offer such degrees could be deemed dishonest or unethical conduct. He also ruled that defamation occurs in the country where the material is downloaded from the Internet. In December 2005, the Court of Appeal said the defamation case could not go ahead. Newlands and Forrester had not shown it had a good arguable case that an act had been done in New Zealand for which damages could be claimed from a party outside New Zealand. Without their showing a good arguable case, New Zealand courts would not assume jurisdiction.

== South Korea ==
In March 2006, prosecutors in Seoul had "broken up a crime ring selling bogus music diplomas from Russia, which helped many land university jobs and seats in orchestras." People who used these degrees were criminally charged.

== Sri Lanka ==
According to Sri Lankan law, it is a criminal offense to use the term "university" or to purport to offer university degrees (Bachelors, Masters, Doctors) without government authorization in Sri Lanka.

== Switzerland ==
Switzerland does not require prior authorisation to offer higher education courses, organise examinations or issue degrees. Federal or cantonal authorities may supervise private institutions and/or authorise them to offer courses and issue degrees. This supervision means that private institutions are required to accept a certain amount of state control. They must undergo quality inspections if they wish to issue valid degrees that will be recognised as such. Non protected titles from private institutions are nevertheless common. The education offered by federal and cantonal universities is of higher quality than in private institutions, with rare exceptions. The names University and University of Applied Sciences are protected by law and may only be used by publicly accredited institutions.

== United Kingdom ==
In the United Kingdom, only institutions with degree-awarding powers awarded by royal charter or by or under an act of parliament can grant degrees, and courses leading to UK degrees can only be offered by these institutions or institutions validated by an institution with degree awarding powers (with the exception of a small number of "recognised awards" that are specifically designated by the Secretary of State). However, it is not an offence for overseas bodies to offer their own qualifications in Britain as long as it is made clear that these are not UK degrees. A list of "recognised bodies" that have degree awarding powers, "listed bodies" that offer courses leading to degrees from recognised bodies, and "recognised awards" is maintained by the British government. The government also maintains a list of educational institutions that are entitled to sponsor students for visas, although lack of inclusion on this list does not necessarily imply that an institution is 'bogus,' merely that they are not licensed to sponsor students for visas.

== United States ==
Unlike in some countries, the term "college" or "university" is not legally protected in the United States on a national level; however, such terms are restricted by some states. The federal government does not accredit any institutions or programs, either inside or outside of the United States. Instead, it maintains a list of valid, reliable, independent accrediting agencies, including private organizations and, for vocational schools, state accrediting agencies. The agency maintains a complete list of accredited institutions and programs online.

Most states require degree-issuing higher education institutions to obtain a basic business license—the same simple paperwork required of any business, such as a day care center or a grocery store—and to register with the state or to have other formal authorization in order to enroll students or issue degrees; however, these legal authorizations are not the same as educational accreditation. Some U.S. state laws allow authorities to shut down illegal operations of unaccredited schools or diploma mills. In others, particularly, Idaho, Hawaii, Montana, and California, the state permits anyone to claim to operate a college and issue degrees with essentially no oversight. Additionally, in 21 jurisdictions, unaccredited religious degree-granting schools are exempted from government oversight.

Students studying at an unaccredited institution are never eligible for financial aid, including student loans, through any federal government agency. It is legal for the school itself or other private entities to offer financial assistance to students.

Some unaccredited institutions and programs provide significant, legitimate academic work. In others, the "college" is little more than a mailbox to which money is sent.

Any degrees issued may or may not be valid for obtaining professional licenses or employment. Generally speaking, within academic and government circles, such degrees are rejected, but within the business world, they may be acceptable for certain purposes. Using a diploma from an unrecognized institution to obtain employment or for any other purpose is illegal in some states. Criminal penalties may apply should such a degree be fraudulently presented in lieu of one from an accredited school.

=== Degrees offered ===
Unaccredited institutions of higher education may include legitimate religious institutions offering ordination or doctoral degrees based on religious training, but many other unaccredited institutions are diploma mills offering counterfeit degrees for a price.

==== Degrees offered by unaccredited religious institutions ====
Some unaccredited religious institutions may award degrees that are accepted by civil service or other employers, though employment qualifications vary from state to state in the United States. Some seminaries and bible colleges see accreditation issues as a government intrusion on religious freedom. Unaccredited bible colleges may offer associate's degrees, diplomas, or certificates. Seminary degree titles offered may be Doctor of Divinity (D.D. or D.Div.).

==== Historical perspectives: diploma mill degrees ====
The Council for Higher Education Accreditation (CHEA) has reported,

During the latter part of the 19th century, the value of the degree increased substantially, as evidenced by the passage of the Morrill Land Grant Act and the founding of many new colleges. This created a market for degrees, and fraudulent providers moved into the market to meet the demand. The first documented reference to degree mills was in 1876 when John Eaton, a United States Commissioner of Education, called them a disgrace to American education.

Walter C. John wrote in School Life in 1937 that he first learned of "counterfeit degrees" in 1903. John listed examples of counterfeit degrees offered: "Business psychologist, practitioner of truth, doctor of psychology, doctor of metaphysics, doctor of divinity".

Describing "$100 doctors" in 1940, Joseph Burton Vaschen listed the degree offerings of five degree mills: Doctor of Psychology (Ps.D.), Doctor of Metaphysics (Ms.D.), Doctor of Divinity (D.D.), Doctor of Psychology (Ps.D.), Doctor of Mental Science (D.M.S.), Doctor of Universal Truth (U.T.D.), Degree of Master of Education (M.Ed), or Doctor of Philosophy (Ph.D.) in Education, and Doctor of Education (Ed.D.).

A review of Morris Fishbein's 1949 article, "Beware the Mind-Meddler" in Woman's Home Companion, highlighted the need for legislative action "to restrain those charlatans who prey on the goodwill and the wallets of emotionally disturbed people". Fishbein had written, "...there is not one state in the union with adequate legal standards stipulating who may and who may not dispense psychologic advice." He identified "Doctor of Psychology" and "Doctor of Metaphysics" as "quack degrees".

A 1960 study of doctorates unaccredited institutions offered for psychotherapists included a table with the following degrees:

- Doctor of Psychology
- Doctor of Metaphysics
- Doctor of Science
- Doctor of Psychotherapy
- Doctor of BioPsychology (BPD)
- Doctor of Philosophy in Metaphysics (PhDM)
- Doctor of Divinity in Metaphysics (DDM)
- Doctor of Divinity
- Doctor of Naturatics (NaD)
- Master of Psychology and Scientific Truth (ScTM)
- Master of Psychic Science (MPsSc)
- Licentiate in Hypnotherapy (LHy)
- Psychic Reader
- Metaphysical Counselor
- Master Metaphysician
- Ordination

In 2019, Bruce Thayer described "legitimate approaches to earning the social work doctorate on a parttime or nonresidential basis" and then identified "predatory social work" programs offering degrees in sex therapy, clinical hypnotherapy, metaphysical hypnosis, natural health, transpersonal psychology, and transpersonal counseling.

According to CHEA, "...there is more and more pressure on individuals to earn degrees, not only bachelor's degrees, but master's and doctoral degrees as well. Jobs and promotions increasingly go to individuals with the greatest educational qualifications, even when individuals' work experience may be more relevant to the job than is a degree. This creates pressures on individuals to obtain degrees, tempting some to take the easy route to a degree – the degree mill."

== See also ==
- Accreditation mill
- List of unaccredited institutions of higher education
- List of unrecognized higher education accreditation organizations
