= Operation Dipscam =

Operation Dipscam was a series of separate investigations conducted by the Federal Bureau of Investigation (FBI), the General Accountability Office, the Committee on Education and the Workforce, and other United States agencies from 1980 to 1991. It led to more than 20 convictions and the closing of 39 diploma mills.

Dipscam began from an initial 1980 investigation by the Charlotte Field Office of the FBI into Southeastern University of Greenville, SC and evolved into multiple investigations of diploma mills throughout the United States and abroad. During Dipscam, 40 diplomas with transcripts were purchased, 16 federal search warrants were executed, 19 Federal grand jury indictments were returned, 40 schools were dismantled, and over 20 convictions were obtained. The FBI identified over 12,500 "graduates" of these institutions from school records, including federal, state, and county employees. Seized school records indicated that many "graduates" were employed in business, education, law enforcement, and medicine.

Some investigations were one-person operations, while others had numerous employees. For several investigations, the FBI joined forces with the U.S. Postal Inspection Service and the Internal Revenue Service to handle postal and tax-related aspects of the case. Information from each investigation was shared with appropriate federal authorities and was the subject of several Congressional hearings.

For the hearing by the Subcommittee on Housing and Consumer Interests of the Select Committee on Aging, a prior Dipscam defendant was brought to testify from federal prison by the U.S. Marshals. The witness had earned over $2,000,000 in gross income while operating Southwestern University. Before these hearings, committee investigators purchased a Ph.D. diploma from a California school on behalf of Representative Claude Pepper, who then jokingly called himself "Dr. Pepper," apparently referring to the beverage of the same name.

Both the House and Senate Committees on Government Affairs, as well as the Subcommittee on 21st Century Competitiveness of the Committee on Education and the Workforce, later held other hearings on the subject. The Government Accountability Office (GAO) investigated several schools for the Committees on Government Affairs, even purchasing several diplomas from Lexington University for Senator Susan Collins. In at least one instance, a committee investigator registered as a student at one of these schools; several of her recorded telephone conversations were played during these hearings.

== See also ==
- Accreditation mill
- University Degree Program
- List of unaccredited institutions of higher learning
