= Seminaries of the Lutheran Church – Missouri Synod =

The Lutheran Church – Missouri Synod (LCMS) operates two seminaries for the formation of its pastors: Concordia Seminary in St. Louis, Missouri, and Concordia Theological Seminary in Fort Wayne, Indiana. Both seminaries grant the Master of Divinity degree which is ordinarily required to be ordained in the LCMS. They also offer a "colloquy" program for pastors who were ordained in other church bodies and want to join the LCMS. Advanced degrees such as Doctor of Philosophy and Master of Sacred Theology are also offered.

The seminaries operate independently of the Concordia University System, which comprises six undergraduate institutions of the LCMS.

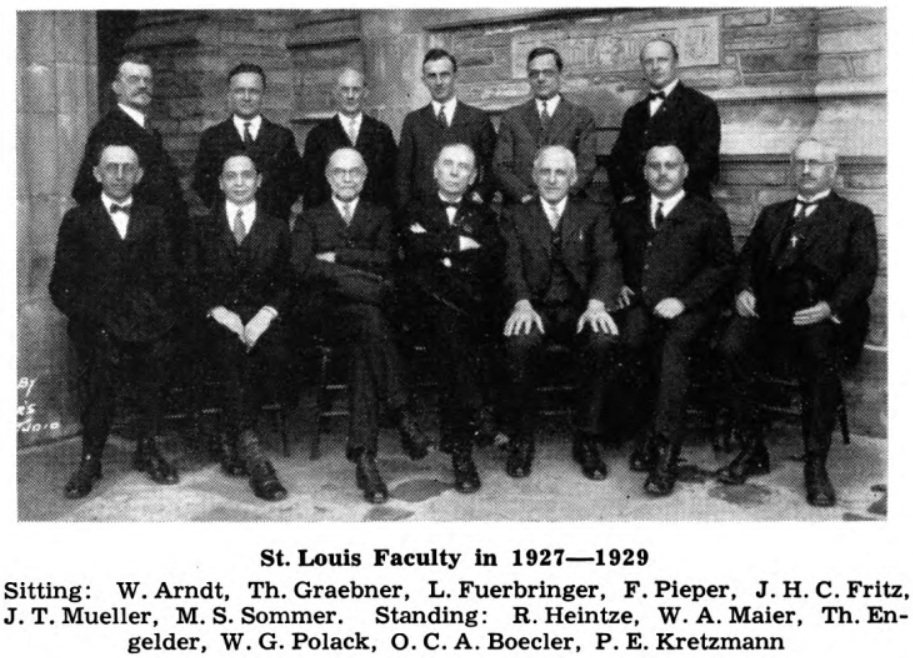
The faculty of the St. Louis seminary in 1927–1929.
