= American University of London =

Online diploma mill

- Type: For-profit, unaccredited
- Established: 1984 (as American College of Science & Technology)
- Location: London, United Kingdom
- Campus: None (online only)
- Affiliations: American Association for Higher Education and Accreditation (not recognized)
- Website: www.auol.edu.au

The American University of London (AUOL) is an online diploma mill. The company disputes the label and instead describes itself as a for-profit unaccredited educational institution offering undergraduate and graduate degrees solely by distance learning. It is a different organization from the American University in London.

The institution has no campus. Its website says it was established in 1984 as the American College of Science & Technology and was incorporated as an independent distance learning institution in 1999 in St. Kitts and Nevis. The website lists mailing addresses in London and Beverly Hills, California. Bears' Guide and several U.S. state education agencies indicate that the institution is associated with the Anacrusis Institute, an unaccredited institution based in Greece and the United Kingdom.

== Accreditation status ==
The university's website and associated prospectus states that it is accredited in the United States by agencies specializing primarily in distance learning.

The Oregon Office of Degree Authorization (ODA) identifies two possibly unrelated entities operating under the name "American University of London", one in St. Kitts and Nevis, the United Kingdom and Sri Lanka, and the other in Saudi Arabia. According to ODA, the Saudi Arabian institution does not have degree-granting authority in Saudi Arabia and neither institution has legal authority to enroll Oregon students and their credentials may not be used in the state. American University of London also appears on lists of unaccredited colleges and universities maintained by the U.S. states of Maine and Texas.

According to the AUOL prospectus, the university has "not applied for accreditation with any American nor British official accreditor". The same prospectus adds that its degrees are validated due to their "agreement with a renowned USA agency" who are able to issue Equivalency Certificates to AUOL graduates. This agency is not named. AUOL is also a member of the American Association for Higher Education and Accreditation, which is not a recognized accreditor. AUOL is not a valid UK degree awarding body.
