= Concordia University System =

University network of the Lutheran Church–Missouri Synod

- Abbreviation: CUS
- Formation: 1992; 34 years ago
- Purpose: Lutheran higher education
- Headquarters: St. Louis, Missouri, United States
- Region served: United States
- President: Jamison Hardy
- Vice President: Douglas H. Spittel
- Parent organization: Lutheran Church–Missouri Synod
- Website: cus.edu

The Concordia University System (CUS) is an organization of five colleges and universities and one satellite campus in the United States that are operated by the Lutheran Church – Missouri Synod (LCMS). All of the institutions are named "Concordia"—a reference to the Latin title of The Book of Concord, the collection of Lutheran confessions—and all include professional church work programs as part of their curricula. The CUS was formed in 1992. In 2011, 28,421 students attended Concordia University System institutions. In 2021, the official website for the system claimed an enrollment of over 35,000 students.

Each Concordia except the one in Ann Arbor, Michigan, is independent and has its own president, faculty, and board of regents; Concordia University Ann Arbor is now a satellite campus of Concordia University Wisconsin. At the same time, the schools interact with one another and share some resources and services. One service offered by the CUS, the Simultaneous Enrollment Program, allows any student enrolled at one Concordia to attend another CUS college for up to a year as a "visiting student". During that time, visiting students are considered to be enrolled at both CUS institutions simultaneously.

The 2019 convention of the LCMS passed Resolution 7-03 to create a new governance model for the schools. In February 2021, a committee appointed by the synod's board of directors tentatively proposed a new model under which each school's board of regents and administration would be responsible for its own property and business matters, while the CUS would be replaced with a Commission on University Education which would govern the "ecclesiastical functions and connections of the schools" and would establish "ecclesiastical accreditation process". The plan is not complete and the committee is receiving comments from interested parties in the LCMS.

== Campuses ==
The six campuses in the Concordia University System are:

- Concordia University Ann Arbor in Ann Arbor, Michigan - A branch campus of Concordia University Wisconsin since 2013
- Concordia University Chicago in River Forest, Illinois
- Concordia University Irvine in Irvine, California
- Concordia University, Saint Paul in Saint Paul, Minnesota
- Concordia University, Nebraska in Seward, Nebraska
- Concordia University Wisconsin in Mequon, Wisconsin

Several former members of CUS have closed since 2018: Concordia College Alabama, in Selma, Alabama, closed in 2018; Concordia University in Portland, Oregon, closed in 2020; and Concordia College–New York in Bronxville, New York, closed in 2021. Concordia University Texas in Austin, Texas was formerly part of the system, but filed for a governance independent of CUS and the LCMS and declined to seat regents elected at the 2023 LCMS convention. As of 2025, the university is in a legal dispute with the LCMS over ownership and accountability of the institution and is not considered to be a CUS or LCMS school while the court case is unsettled.

== Non-member institutions ==
There are several educational institutions named "Concordia" that are not part of the Concordia University System. For example, neither of the LCMS seminaries (Concordia Seminary and Concordia Theological Seminary) are part of CUS. The non-accredited Concordia College and University is in no way affiliated with the Concordia University System or its seven campuses.

The educational institutions of the Lutheran Church–Canada are not part of the CUS even though that church body was originally part of the LCMS and remains associated with it. Those institutions are Concordia Lutheran Seminary in Edmonton, and Concordia Lutheran Theological Seminary in St. Catharines. Concordia University of Edmonton was founded as a Lutheran institution, but has since secularized.

Other schools of higher education named Concordia that are affiliated with neither the CUS nor the LCMS include Concordia College in Moorhead, Minnesota, and Concordia University in Montreal.

== See also ==
- California Concordia College in Oakland, which closed in 1973
- Concordia College (Indiana) in Fort Wayne, which closed in 1957
- Concordia College (North Carolina) in Conover, which closed in 1935
- Concordia Senior College in Fort Wayne, Indiana, which closed in 1977
- St. John's College (Kansas) in Winfield, Kansas, which closed in 1986
- List of Lutheran colleges and universities
