= Oregon Office of Student Access and Completion =

The Oregon Office of Student Access and Completion (OSAC), formerly known as the Oregon Student Access Commission and established by the Oregon Legislature in 1959 as the Oregon Student Assistance Commission, is primarily charged with administering student financial aid programs, and through its Office of Degree Authorization, authorizing and regulating the granting of degrees by private educational institutions within the U.S. state of Oregon.

On January 1, 2012, the Oregon Student Assistance Commission became the Oregon Student Access Commission. Under state legislation enacted in 2011, governance of the Office of Degree Authorization moved to the new Oregon Higher Education Coordinating Commission on July 1, 2012. By July 1, 2014, OSAC had been renamed the Oregon "Office of Student Access and Completion".
