= Novi magazin =

Novi magazin (Serbian Cyrillic: Нови магазин, English: New Magazine) is a Serbian-language weekly print news magazine headquartered in Belgrade. It features original articles on social, economic, and political topics, with the editorial policy described as "moderately critical [of the Serbian government] and pro-European". The magazine was founded in 2011.

The chairman and editor-in-chief is Nadežda Gaće, a journalist who served as the president of Independent Journalist Association of Serbia (Nezavisno udruženje novinara Srbije – NUNS). Deputy editor-in-chief is Mijat Lakićević.

The magazine was established with financial help from Miroslav Bogićević, a businessman who owns an array of Serbian companies, most notably Farmakom. Before establishing Novi magazin, Bogićević unsuccessfully tried to purchase the major political magazine NIN. Nadežda Gaće is registered as the sole owner in the Serbian Business Registers Agency.

News desk of the magazine includes Marija Kolaković, Đurađ Šimić and Miša Brkić. Regular columnists are Dimitrije Boarov, Vladimir Gligorov and Momčilo Pantelić. A novelist Marija Sajkas is a regular contributor from the U.S.

== Awards ==
- In 2011, the Erste Bank EU Office in cooperation with the Office of the EU Delegation to Serbia and the European Integration Office of the Government of the Republic of Serbia awarded the prize for the best newspaper report on the European integration process in Serbia to Danica Čigoja of Novi magazin.
