= John Bear (educator) =

American businessman

John Bjorn Bear is an American businessman in the distance education industry. He is also a writer of creative reference works.

== Early life and education ==
Bear attended Reed College in Oregon (class of 1959), and holds bachelor's and master's degrees from University of California, Berkeley (1959 and 1960, respectively) and a doctorate from Michigan State University (1966).

== Career ==
He is the author of Bears' Guide to Earning Degrees by Distance Learning, whose 16th edition was published in 2006. He is also co-author of the first two editions (of five total) of the book now called Walston's Guide to Christian Distance Learning. He has been engaged by the FBI in its investigations of diploma mills for some twenty years.

In the past, Bear was involved with several unaccredited start-up distance learning institutions, including Columbia Pacific University, Fairfax University, and Greenwich University. He describes the nature of these affiliations in Bears' Guide to Earning Degrees by Distance Learning and on his website. Bear is widely acknowledged to be a leading authority on distance learning and diploma mills. In 2004, he was interviewed by CBS's 60 Minutes for an investigation involving Hamilton University. He has appeared as a degree mill expert on TV shows including Good Morning America, Inside Edition and American Journal.

Bear has written or co-authored 35 books on education, cooking, consumerism, humor, computers, and the world of publishing.

== Personal life ==
Bear lives in Portland, Oregon with his wife Marina. They have three daughters and five grandchildren.

== Books ==
=== Education related ===
- Bear, John; Mariah Bear (2003-01-01). Bears' Guide to Earning Degrees by Distance Learning. Ten Speed Press. ISBN 1-58008-431-1.
- Degree Mills: the billion dollar industry that has sold more than a million fake degrees (with Allen Ezell; Prometheus Books, January 2005) ISBN 978-1-59102-238-1
- Get Your IT Degree and Get Ahead (with Mariah Bear and Tom Head; Osborne McGraw-Hill, 1999) ISBN 978-0-07-212605-1
- Bears' Guide to the Best MBAs by Distance Learning (with Mariah Bear, Ten Speed Press, January 2000), ISBN 978-1-58008-220-4
- Bears' Guide to the Best Computer Degrees by Distance Learning (with Mariah Bear and Larry McQueary, Ten Speed Press, March 2001), ISBN 978-1-58008-221-1
- Bears' Guide to the Best Education Degrees by Distance Learning (with Mariah Bear, Thomas Nixon, and Tom Head, Ten Speed Press), March 1, 2004, ISBN 978-1-58008-333-1
- Bears' Guide to Finding Money for College (with Mariah Bear; Ten Speed Press, November 1997) ISBN 0-89815-933-4
- Guide to Nontraditional Higher Education (Grosset & Dunlap)
- Fifteen monographs on the higher education systems of the United States, Germany, Cuba, Mexico, and other countries (NOOSR, the Australian National Office on Overseas Skills Recognition, published by the Australian National Publishing Office, 1990–1994).

=== Miscellaneous ===
- Morning Food from Cafe Beaujolais (with Margaret Fox, Ten Speed Press; 1985; completely revised edition, 2006) ISBN 978-0-89815-309-5
- The Something-Went-Wrong, What-Do-I-Do-Now Cookbook (with Marina Bear; Harcourt Brace Jovanovich, 1970), ISBN 978-0-15-183735-9
- Signals and Messages (British Publishing Company, London)
- The Blackmail Diet: lose weight or else (Ten Speed Press, January 1, 1982)
- Not Your Mother's Cookbook (with Marina Bear; SLG Books, 2004) ISBN 978-0-943389-37-0
- Send This Jerk the Bedbug Letter: how corporations, politicians, and the media deal with consumer complaints (Ten Speed Press, May 1, 1996) ISBN 978-0-89815-811-3
- The #1 New York Times Bestseller (a book about the phenomenon of bestsellers; Ten Speed Press, January 1, 1992)
- Complaint Letters for Busy People (with Mariah Bear, Career Press, July 1999), ISBN 978-1-56414-403-4
- How to Repair Food (with Marina Bear and Tanya Zeryck, Ten Speed Press, revised edition, March 2004) ISBN 978-0-89815-555-6
- Computer Wimp: 166 things I wish I knew before I bought my first computer, Ten Speed Press, 1983. ISBN 978-0-89815-102-2
- Computer Wimp No More: the intelligent beginner's guide to computers (with David Pozerycki), Ten Speed Press, revised edition 1991. ISBN 978-0-89815-432-0
- Mailing from Mexico (Wightman Publishing)
- The Unusual Guide to Unusual Shopping in San Francisco (with Jay Conrad Levinson and Pat Levinson, Price/Stern/Sloan, January 1, 1972)
- The Prince and the Frog and the Princess and the Mole and the Prince and the Frog and (children's book, Tricycle Press, October 1, 1994), ISBN 978-1-883672-07-2
- The World's Worst Proverbs (Price/Stern/Sloan, 1976), ISBN 978-0-8431-0407-3
- So You're In Your Twenties (Price/Stern/Sloan)
- So You're in Your Thirties
- So You're in Your Forties
- So You're in Your Fifties
- So You're in Your Sixties
