= Oregon Office of Degree Authorization =

The Oregon Office of Degree Authorization (ODA) is a unit of the Office of Student Access and Completion, with responsibilities related to maintaining high standards in private higher education institutions in Oregon. ODA administers laws and provides oversight of private colleges and universities offering degree programs in the state, validates individual claims of degrees, enforces the closure of substandard or fraudulent higher education programs in the state, and enforces policy for publicly funded postsecondary programs and locations. It was formerly a unit of the Oregon Student Access Commission (OSAC), which became Oregon Student Assistance Commission prior to January 1, 2012. Its functions moved to the Oregon Higher Education Coordinating Commission as part of the Office of Student Access and Completion in July 2012.

== Statutory functions ==
ODA has two main functions under statute (Oregon Revised Statutes 348.603 to 348.615):

1. Authorization of institutions offering academic degrees in Oregon or to Oregon students from outside the state. Any school that is not a part of the public postsecondary system of Oregon must be approved or determined "exempt" by ODA before offering courses leading to a degree in Oregon. ODA evaluates college degree programs, authorizes each degree program for a fixed term, and provides oversight of the programs during the authorization period.
2. Validation of degrees (for individuals, employers, and licensing boards) and investigation of fraudulent higher education programs. ODA collaborates with higher education agencies in other states and countries to determine equivalency of degrees, to enforce closure of illegal diploma mills and degree mills in Oregon, and to share information and assist with enforcement around the world.

ODA collaborates with the Office of University Coordination, Office of Community Colleges and Workforce Development, Oregon Independent Colleges Association, and the Office of Private Postsecondary Education. ODA is responsible for 26 private colleges and universities offering Associate, Bachelor's, Master's, and PhD degree programs, as well as for more than 100 institutions outside of Oregon that offer full or partial degree programs to Oregon residents via online or distance learning. ODA also determines exemption of colleges and universities that meet specific criteria, and currently has approved five colleges under a special religious exemption to offer limited-title degrees in theology and religious occupations.

== History ==
The functions were at one time assigned to the Oregon Education Coordinating Council, which in 1975 was reconfigured and renamed the Oregon Educational Coordinating Commission. In 1987 it became the Office of Educational Policy and Planning. ODA became a component of the Oregon Student Assistance Commission (OSAC) in 1997 when the Office of Educational Policy and Planning was dismantled.

Alan Contreras was head of ODA from 1999 until his retirement in March 2011. Under his direction, Oregon's ODA came to be regarded as being "at the forefront of efforts to address fake degree problems" and "a model" for other states instituting similar programs. Jennifer Diallo succeeded Contreras, first as interim administrator. She became administrator on a permanent basis in January 2012; as of October 2013, the ODA website reported that Diallo was "no longer with ODA."

State legislation enacted in 2011 establishes a new Oregon Higher Education Coordinating Commission, effective July 1, 2012, and provides for ODA and its functions to move into the new organization upon its formation.

== Website ==
ODA maintains a website on which it provides information about higher education in Oregon, the state's approval and authorization processes, educational accreditation, alleged diploma mills, unaccredited schools approved to offer degrees in Oregon, and degrees that are not valid in the state. Agencies with similar responsibilities in other jurisdictions recommend the ODA website as an information resource. For example, New Jersey Higher Education describes it as "excellent and extensive", the Missouri Department of Higher Education recommends it for "deal[ing] with the subject of diploma mills in great detail", and the U.S. Federal Trade Commission advises employers that "there is no comprehensive list of diploma mills on the Web because new phony credentialing sources arise all the time", but recommends the ODA list as a resource.

== GAO investigation ==
In 2001, when the United States federal government's General Accounting Office (GAO) began an investigation of diploma mills and the use of fraudulent degrees to obtain financial benefit, it used the ODA list of diploma mills and unaccredited institutions as a starting point. The GAO compared a list of 43 institutions on the ODA list with the degrees claimed in résumés posted on a government-sponsored website and found 1,200 résumés that listed degrees from 14 of the 43 institutions on the list.

== See also ==
- Oregon Department of Education
