= Accreditation mill =

Fraudulent organization, not recognized for educational accreditation

An accreditation mill is an organization that purports to award educational accreditation to higher education institutions without requiring government authority or recognition from mainstream academia to operate as an accreditor. Implicit in the terminology is the assumption that the "mill" has low standards (or no standards) for such accreditation. Accreditation mills are much like diploma mills, and in many cases are closely associated with diploma mills. The "accreditation" they supply has no legal or academic value but is used in diploma mill marketing to help attract students.

Some institutions obtain accreditation from an independent group with low standards. In other cases, the institution sets up its own seemingly independent accreditation board and then accredits itself. This gives the appearance that an outside group has approved the education that is offered at the school.

In many countries, accreditation is a government function. In the United States, governments normally do not accredit academic institutions, but federal education authorities recognize about 18 private accrediting organizations for institutional accreditation of higher education institutions and more than 60 other private organizations for accreditation of specific educational programs. While standards vary from organization to organization, without recognition from the Council for Higher Education Accreditation (CHEA) (a non-governmental organization) or the United States Department of Education, the claims made by independent groups hold no value in the academic community.

== Characteristics ==
CHEA has published a list of attributes of accreditation mills to help consumers identify them. According to CHEA, an accreditation operation might be a "mill" if it:

- Allows accreditation to be purchased
- Allows institutions to attain accredited status in a very short period of time
- Does not conduct site visits or interviews of key personnel as part of its accreditation process, instead of reviewing institutions solely on the basis of submitted documents
- Grants "permanent" accreditation, with no requirement for later periodic review
- Claims recognition from an authority such as CHEA without appearing on lists of accreditors recognized by that authority
- Has a name that is very similar to the name of a recognized accrediting organization
- Publishes a list of institutions or programs that it has accredited without the knowledge of the listed institutions and programs
- Publishes few or no standards for quality
- Publishes claims for which there is no evidence.

Verifile's Accredibase notes that some accreditation mills do not reveal their locations, which makes it difficult to determine whether they are legitimate. Some other mills have been found to use the same addresses as the education providers that claim accreditation from them.

== Consumer information resources ==
To help consumers avoid diploma mills and accreditation mills, several national and international bodies publish lists of recognized accreditors and accredited educational institutions, as well as accreditors that are known to lack the necessary legal authority or recognition, and higher education providers known to lack accreditation. The United States organization CHEA maintains an international directory of education ministries and other recognized higher education quality assurance bodies worldwide. The 2007 version of that directory lists 467 recognized bodies in 175 countries.

== Proposed U.S. legal definition ==
A proposal for legislation that was announced in the U.S. House of Representatives in January 2010 would have inserted a definition of "accreditation mill" into U.S. law. The proposal, sponsored by Congressmen Timothy Bishop of New York and Michael Castle of Delaware, would have defined the term to mean "an education or corporate organization that offers a form of educational recognition or accreditation, for a fee or free of charge, that extend[s] a permanent recognition or accreditation status to an institution with few or no requirements for subsequent periodic reviews; (B) publish[es] a list of institutions and programs recognized or accredited by such organization that includes institutions and programs that did not apply for or otherwise request such recognition or accreditation by the organization; or (C) lack[s] national recognition by the Secretary of Education or the Council for Higher Education Accreditation."

== See also ==
- Unaccredited institutions of higher education
- List of unrecognized higher education accreditation organizations
- List of unaccredited institutions of higher learning
