= Council for Higher Education Accreditation =

University accreditation organization in the USA

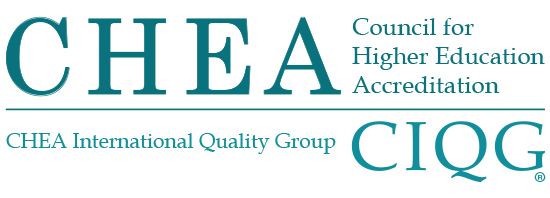
- Abbreviation: CHEA
- Established: 1996
- Headquarters: One Dupont Circle NW, Suite 510, Washington, D.C., U.S.
- President: Cynthia Jackson Hammond
- Key people: Dottie King, Board Chair
- Website: chea.org

The Council for Higher Education Accreditation (CHEA) is an American organization of degree-granting colleges and universities based in Washington D.C.

It advocates for the quality of higher education accrediting organizations, including regional, faith-based, private, career, and programmatic accrediting organizations.

CHEA's members include accredited colleges and universities, and currently recognizes approximately 64 accrediting organizations. It is a member of the International Network for Quality Assurance Agencies in Higher Education.

== History ==
Established in 1996, CHEA is the successor to several earlier national nongovernmental associations formed to coordinate the U.S. accreditation process for higher education.

In 1974, the Federation of Regional Accrediting Commissions of Higher Education and the National Commission on Accrediting merged to form the Council on Postsecondary Accreditation (COPA). In 1993, COPA was dissolved because of internal tensions caused by the increasing problems for higher education in the 1980s and 1990s. Problems with tuition increases, scandals, and doubts about the value of postsecondary higher education plagued all parts of the higher education sector. In particular, Congressional investigations of increasing student loan defaults and student aid abuses were highly critical of accreditation and accreditation processes.

Consequently, the 1992 amendments to the Higher Education Act of 1965 included Program Integrity provisions designed to strengthen the gatekeeping triad for student loan guarantees and financial aid (i.e., state licensing bodies, accreditation associations, and Federal government). State Postsecondary Review Entities (SPREs) were also established, giving federal bodies accrediting powers under special conditions, something which had never been done before.

Early in 1993, the regional accreditors voted to leave COPA, indicating their dissatisfaction with COPA's political representation in the U.S. Congress which was widely viewed as ineffective, particularly regarding the establishment of the SPREs. In April 1993, COPA voted to disband itself by the end of the year.

Work by the National Policy Board on Higher Education Institutional Accreditation and other groups laid the groundwork for a national successor to COPA. Among their concerns were establishing a more grassroots membership, billing and fees, and advisory roles for the accrediting associations, improving the public image of accrediting, and improving the ability to lobby the Federal government.

CHEA's immediate predecessor was the Council for Recognition of Postsecondary Accreditation, which was formed following the dissolution of COPA. CHEA grandfathered in those accrediting associations recognized by COPA, provided that more than half the institutions that they accredited granted degrees.

== Information resources ==
Each accreditor recognized by CHEA is independent, meaning that accreditation requirements vary from group to group. CHEA maintains a website that contains a searchable database to check the accreditation status of recognized accreditation agencies, accredited schools, or schools currently in the process of getting accreditation.

In 2012, CHEA launched the CHEA International Quality Group (CIQG), which provides a database of recognized accreditation agencies globally.

== Board of directors ==
CHEA is led by a board of directors consisting of 20 members, including presidents of colleges and universities, other institutional representatives, and members of the public. As of 2025, Dottie King, President of Independent Colleges of Indiana, is the chair of the CHEA Board of Directors.

The staff president of CHEA is Cynthia Jackson Hammond.

== Viewpoints ==
CHEA has voiced opposition to various accreditation reform efforts by the U.S. Department of Education.

The organization faces challenges in helping the public to better understand accreditation in the U.S., and to distinguish between the recognition of accrediting agencies conducted by the U.S. secretary of education and those recognized by private nongovernmental associations, such as CHEA.

== Relationship to government ==
CHEA recognition of accreditors differs from the recognition by the U.S. Secretary of Education required for Title IV (HEA) student financial aid eligibility and loan guarantees.

For the purpose of state government oversight of higher education, the state of Oregon authorizes accreditation organizations recognized by both the U.S. Department of Education and CHEA to operate in the state. However, organizations that are recognized by CHEA but not also the Department of Education may operate only with oversight from the Oregon Student Assistance Commission.

== See also ==
- Higher education accreditation in the United States
- List of recognized higher education accreditation organizations
- National Association of Credential Evaluation Services
