= Diploma mill =

Issuer of fraudulent diplomas

A diploma mill or degree mill is a business that sells illegitimate diplomas or academic degrees. The term diploma mill is also used pejoratively to describe any educational institution with low standards for admission and graduation, low career placement rate, or low average starting salaries of its graduates.

The degrees can be fabricated, falsified, or misrepresented. These businesses may claim to give credit for relevant life experience but without actual prior learning assessment programs. They may also claim to evaluate work history or require submission of a thesis or dissertation for evaluation to give an appearance of authenticity. Diploma mills are frequently supported by accreditation mills set up for the purpose of providing an appearance of authenticity. Diploma mills are considered a global threat to academic integrity.

== Terminology ==
The term "diploma mill" originally denotes an institution providing diplomas on an intensive and profit-making basis, like a factory. More broadly, it describes any institution that offers qualifications which are not accredited nor based on proper academic assessment. While the terms "degree mill" and "diploma mill" are commonly used interchangeably, within the academic community a distinction is sometimes drawn. A "degree mill" issues diplomas from unaccredited institutions which may be legal in some states but are generally illegitimate, while a "diploma mill" issues counterfeit diplomas bearing the names of real universities.

Academic diplomas may be legitimately awarded without any study as a recognition of authority or experience. When given extraordinarily, such degrees are called honorary degrees or honoris causa degrees. Also, in some universities, holders of a lower degree (such as a bachelor's degree) may be routinely awarded honorary higher degrees (such as a master's degree) without study.

The term "diploma mill" may also be used pejoratively to describe a legitimate institution with low academic admission standards and a low job placement rate, such as some for-profit schools.

== Characteristics ==
Diploma mills share a number of features that differentiate them from respected institutions, although some legitimate institutions may exhibit some of the same characteristics.

=== Accreditation and authenticity ===
The most notable feature of diploma mills is that they lack accreditation by a nationally recognized accrediting agency. (Note, however, that not all unaccredited institutions of higher learning are diploma mills.) Diploma mills therefore employ various tactics in an attempt to appear more legitimate to potential students. Background-screening firms commonly report that the awarding institution cannot verify the qualification, since no assessment or enrolment records exist.

Some diploma mills claim accreditation by an accreditation mill while referring to themselves as being "fully accredited". Accreditation mills based in the United States may model their websites after real accrediting agencies overseen by the Council for Higher Education Accreditation (CHEA). Another typical ploy is for mills to claim to be internationally recognized by organizations such as UNESCO. UNESCO has no authority to recognize or accredit higher education institutions or agencies, and has published warnings against education organizations that claim UNESCO recognition or affiliation.

Some diploma and degree mills have played a role in creating unrecognized accrediting bodies as well. These diploma and degree mills may further confuse matters by claiming to consider work history, professional education, and previous learning, and may even require the submission of a dissertation or thesis in order to give an added appearance of legitimacy.

As diploma mills are typically licensed to do business, it is common practice within the industry to misrepresent their business license as indicating government approval of the institution. Promotional materials may use words denoting a legal status such as "licensed", "state authorized", or "state-approved" to suggest an equivalence to accreditation.

Some advertise other indicators of authenticity that are not relevant to academic credentials. For example, the University of Northern Washington advertises that its degrees are "attested and sealed for authenticity by a government appointed notary". In reality notarization only certifies that the document was signed by the person named.

Diploma mills are frequently named to sound confusingly similar to those of prestigious accredited academic institutions. Despite the fact that trademark law is intended to prevent this situation, diploma mills continue to employ various methods to avoid legal recourse. Several diploma mills have adopted British-sounding names, similar but not identical to the names of legitimate universities, apparently to take advantage of the United Kingdom's reputation for educational quality in other parts of the world. Some examples of British-sounding names used by diploma mills are "Shaftesbury University", "University of Dunham", "Redding University", and "Suffield University".

The school's website may well not have an .edu domain, or other country-specific equivalent, since registration of such names is typically restricted. However, enforcement has sometimes been less restrictive, and an .edu domain cannot be taken as verification of school quality or reputation. Some diploma mills use an .ac top-level domain name, which resembles genuine second-level academic domain names like ac.uk but is in fact the ccTLD for Ascension Island. To prevent misuse of their names in this way, some legitimate academic institutions have registered .ac domains.

=== Teaching ===
Compared to legitimate institutions, diploma mills tend to have drastically lowered academic requirements, if any at all. Depending on the institution, students may be required to purchase textbooks, take tests, and submit homework, but degrees are commonly conferred after little or no study.

Instead of "hard sciences", where competence is easier to verify, the subjects offered by a diploma mill are often esoteric and may be based on a pseudoscience like astrology or naturopathy. Such subjects are only vaguely defined, making external verification of educational standards difficult.

Degree mills typically offer little or no interaction with professors. Even if comments and corrections to coursework are given, they may have no bearing on the degree which is awarded. In other cases professors may serve only to write compliments to the student that can be given as references.

=== Facilities ===
Since diploma mills provide little in the way of teaching, there is usually no need for teaching facilities. The school tends to have no library, publications or research, and no more personnel than necessary for operating the mill. Little that is tangible can be found about the institution. If teaching is offered, the professors may themselves hold advanced degrees from the diploma mill itself or from other unaccredited institutions. They may also sport legitimate qualifications that are unrelated to the subject they teach.

Doctoral theses and dissertations from the institution will not be available from University Microfilms International, a national repository, or even the institution's own library, if it has one. The address given by a diploma mill is often a postal box, mail forwarding service or suite number. There are legitimate distance learning institutions with limited facilities, however, but legitimate universities make their authority clear. For academics, publications in peer-reviewed scientific journals are important for establishing scientific credentials. However, in diploma mills, the research is either absent, fake or purely self-published without any external review. This may be hard to spot, since fake journals also exist. Faculty pages with bios and research may even be stolen from legitimate universities.

=== Promotion and fees ===
Buyers often use the diplomas to claim academic credentials for use in securing employment. For example, a schoolteacher might buy a degree from a diploma mill in order to advance to superintendent. Degrees from a diploma mill can be obtained within a few days, weeks or months from the time of enrollment, and back-dating is possible. Academic credit may be offered for "life experience," a point often featured heavily in the selling points of the institution. This should not be confused with legitimate programs offering recognition of prior learning, which allow students to gain academic credit based on past training, experience or independent study. This will usually require a test that the student can fail; in most cases, a diploma mill will grant the degree regardless of results.

Tuition and fees are charged on a per-degree basis rather than by term or by course. Diploma mills are often advertised using e-mail spam or other questionable methods. Legitimate institutions use traditional advertising and high school recruitment. Prospective students are encouraged to "enroll now" before tuition or fees are increased. They may be told that they qualify for a fellowship, scholarship or grant, or offered deals to sign up for multiple degrees at the same time. Promotional literature might contain grammatical and spelling errors, words in Latin, extravagant or pretentious language, and sample diplomas. Some schools' websites may look amateurish or unprofessional, although other diploma mills use appealing websites.

== Legal considerations ==
Degrees and diplomas issued by diploma mills have been used to obtain employment, raises, or clients. Even if issuing or receiving a diploma mill qualification is legal, passing it off as an accredited one for personal gain is a crime in many jurisdictions. In some cases the diploma mill may itself be guilty of an offense, if it knew or ought to have known that the qualifications it issues are used for fraudulent purposes. Diploma mills could also be guilty of fraud if they mislead customers into believing that the qualifications they issue are accredited or recognized, or make false claims that they will lead to career advancement, and accept money on the basis of these claims.

Similar to tax havens, diploma mills frequently employ jurisdiction shopping, operating in another country or legal jurisdiction where running diploma mills is legal, standards are lax or prosecution is unlikely. Splitting the business across jurisdictions can be a way to avoid authorities. A school might operate in one jurisdiction but use a mailing address in a different jurisdiction, for example.

Author John Bear, a distance learning and diploma mills expert, has written that fake degrees are risky for buyers and consumers:

It is like putting a time bomb in your résumé. It could go off at any time, with dire consequences. The people who sell fake degrees will probably never suffer at all, but the people who buy them often suffer mightily. And – particularly if their "degree" is health-related – their clients may be seriously harmed.

=== Australia ===
In Australia, it is a criminal offence to call an institution a university, or issue university degrees, without authorisation through an act of federal or state parliaments.

Under the Higher Education Support Act 2003, corporations wishing to use the term "university" require approval from the relevant government minister, the Minister for Education (as of May 2010).

The corporate regulator Australian Securities & Investments Commission (ASIC) places strict controls on corporations wishing to use the term "university" and if the applicant does not intend to provide education services the name must not imply a connection with an existing university.

The Corporations Regulations 2001 lists the 39 academic organisations permitted to use the title "university".

The use of higher education terms (such as "degree") is protected in state legislation, the e.g. Higher Education (Qld) Act 2003.

=== Brazil ===
In Brazil, the terms "university," "university center," and "college" are regulated by the Ministry of Education (MEC). For an undergraduate or postgraduate degree to be valid nationwide, both the educational institution and the specific course must be recognized by the MEC. Without recognition, the degree has no legal validity.

=== Bosnia and Herzegovina ===
According to the laws on higher education in Bosnia and Herzegovina the terms "university", "faculty", "academy" and "university of applied sciences" can be used only by accredited educational institutions. Accreditation is independently assessed by the Agency for Development of Higher Education and Quality Assurance and formally conferred by the Ministry of Education and Science for each canton, entity or district. Only these institutions are allowed to award academic degrees and diplomas.

Illegal use of academic titles or academic degrees and "non-accredited diplomas" may lead to prosecution, conviction, fines or even imprisonment. Nevertheless, diploma mills remain present in the country (particularly in the Republika Srpska entity as well as the Central Bosnian Canton and West Herzegovina Canton, which have the highest number of such institutions registered).

=== Canada ===
In Canada education, including higher education, falls under the jurisdiction of provincial and territorial governments. Many of the public universities are established by provincial legislation which also confers degree granting authority upon the institution. However, private postsecondary institutions are also required to comply with applicable legislation in order to confer degrees and diplomas.

Provincial or regional quality assurance bodies oversee education at a regional level, and there is no federal oversight. For example, in Ontario the Post-secondary Education Choice and Excellence Act, 2000 regulates degree-granting authority. Any institution that wishes to offer a degree or use the term "university" must be authorized to do so under an Act of the Legislature or by the Minister of Training, Colleges and Universities. A list of recognized Canadian higher education institutions is available on the Canadian Information Centre for International Credentials website.

The topic of diploma mills in Canada has been covered by the popular media since the 1970s, including in-depth investigations by the Canadian Broadcasting Corporation (CBC), news coverage by the Canadian Press and other mainstream media.

=== China ===
Most, but not all, universities and colleges in the People's Republic of China are public institutions. The Ministry of Education, which has legal authority to regulate college enrollment and degree awarding, publishes a yearly list of qualified higher-education institutions. Institutions not on the list cannot admit students or award degrees.

Also, no institution may call itself a "university" or "college" without approval by a provincial-level education department. Any institution, public or private, which wishes to name itself after a geographic region larger than a province (e.g. "South China ... University") must go through the Ministry of Education. A new regulation forbids any new university or college from being named "national", "of China" or similar names.

As of May 2015, China has 210 diploma mills.

=== Denmark ===
Most universities and colleges are public institutions; universities are self-governing, but financed by the state. However, some schools, like Det Nødvendige Seminarium in Tvind provide a degree program that is accredited by the Ministry of Education in Mozambique and the Southern African Development Community.

=== Finland ===
All universities and colleges are public institutions; universities are public institutions or foundations, and vocational universities are municipal organs. There are no private higher educational institutions and no legal mechanism to found or accredit any. Universities are explicitly defined in the Universities Act. Other than universities proper, technical universities (known in Finland as AMK, ammattikorkeakoulu), officially called "Universities of Applied Sciences" in English, can be established with permission from the cabinet. The degrees are protected by law. The list of AMKs can be viewed from the Ministry of Education website.

For purposes of professional qualification, the use of foreign degree qualifications is regulated: if the name of a degree can be confused with a Finnish degree that requires more academic credit, the confusion must be eliminated. Several diploma mills have operated in Finland, and countermeasures in university admissions have become necessary. There are no laws against conferring unaccredited degrees or degrees accredited abroad, as long as a Finnish degree or equivalent is not claimed. Also, English terms like "Bachelor" or "Doctor" are not protected.

=== Germany ===
In Germany, it is a criminal offense to call an institution a Universität (university) or Fachhochschule, or to issue academic degrees, without authorization through an act of the respective state's Ministry of Education. It is also a misdemeanor to falsely claim a degree in Germany if it is not accredited, see de:Missbrauch von Titeln, Berufsbezeichnungen und Abzeichen.

Some corporate training programs in Germany use the English term "corporate university". Such use of the term is tolerated since it is widely understood that such programs are not actual universities. Similarly, Fachhochschulen frequently use the English term "university of applied science". Neither are permitted to use the German word Universität.

=== Greece ===
Institutions of higher Tertiary education Ανώτατα Εκπαιδευτικά Ιδρύματα (ΑΕΙ) (universities and technical universities) and Ανώτατα Τεχνολογικά Εκπαιδευτικά Ιδρύματα (ΑΤΕΙ) (technological educational institutes / universities of applied sciences) in Greece are fully self-managed public entities and are the only institutions that can issue university diplomas. Diplomas issued by foreign educational institutions are validated and assessed by the Hellenic National Academic Recognition and Information Center (Hellenic NARIC).

=== Hong Kong ===
It is illegal under Hong Kong laws chapter 320 Post Secondary Colleges Ordinance section 8 to call an organisation a "university" without approval from the Chief Executive in Council.

Under Hong Kong laws chapter 200 Crimes Ordinance section 73, anyone who knowingly uses false documents with the intention of inducing somebody to accept them as genuine is liable to 14 years' imprisonment. Section 76 assigns the same penalty for anyone who makes or possesses machines that create such false documents.

=== India ===
The University Grants Commission (UGC) states, in section 22 of the University Grants Commission Act of 1956:

The right of conferring or granting degrees shall be exercised only by a University established or incorporated by or under a Central Act, a Provincial Act or a State Act or an institution deemed to be a University under section 3 or an institution specially empowered by an Act of Parliament to confer or grant degrees.

UGC has published a warning dated July 2012 against Indian Institute of Planning and Management (IIPM) about the unrecognized status of IIPM.

=== Ireland ===
Legitimate higher education qualifications in Ireland are placed on, or formally aligned, with the National Framework of Qualifications. This framework was established by the National Qualifications Authority of Ireland in accordance with the Qualifications (Education and Training) Act (1999). It is illegal under the Universities Act (1997) for any body offering higher education services to use the term "university" without the permission of the Minister for Education and Science. It is likewise illegal under the Institutes of Technologies Acts (1992–2006) to use the term "institute of technology" or "regional technology college" without permission.

=== Italy ===
All public and private universities and higher education institutions must be established, or specifically recognized, by decree of the Italian Minister of Education, University and Research; any other institution or organization is therefore not recognized and unaccredited.

=== Japan ===
Under Article 135 of the School Education Act, all universities and post-secondary education institutes in Japan require a government-issued licence from the Ministry of Education, Culture, Sports, Science and Technology (MEXT). Operating such an institute without a licence from MEXT can result in a fine of ¥100,000 for each offence committed. In addition, the National Institution for Academic Degrees and Quality Enhancement of Higher Education (NIAD-QE) has the sole authority to accredit all university and post-secondary qualifications in Japan, as per Article 104 of the School Education Act.

The "Patent University" (ja:特許大学) was an example of a Japanese diploma mill which operated from 1964 until it was shut down in 1980, and which sold fraudulent doctorates for sums ranging between ¥300,000 and ¥5 million. In 2007, MEXT revealed that it had discovered 48 people with suspected falsified qualifications who were successfully hired to teach in 43 universities and post-secondary education institutes throughout Japan between 2004 and 2006.

=== Malaysia ===
In Malaysia, the Education Act 1996 protects the status of the terms "university", "university college" and "branch campus". Only institutions with this status may award academic degrees.

The Private Higher Education Institutions act also places restrictions on the creation and operation of any private higher education institution that conducts any course of study or training programme for which a certificate, diploma or degree is awarded.

Furthermore, all legitimate higher education qualifications are placed on or formally affiliated with the Malaysian Qualifications Framework under the provisions of the Malaysian Qualifications Agency Act 2007. Limited exemptions are however granted to organizations and institutions "where the teaching is confined exclusively to the teaching of any religion" or "any place declared by the Minister by notification in the Gazette not to be an educational institution" under the Education Act 1996.

=== Mexico ===
In Mexico, Under the Education Act the official recognition of studies (RVOE) educational programs offered by private institutions may be granted by the federal education authority, by state education authorities or by both. There are also public institutions of higher education, which are mandated to incorporate programs of these institutions according to its own rules. As of July 10, 2000, the Ministry applied for the granting of RVOE the guidelines established in the "Secretarial Agreement No. 279 establishing the processes and procedures related to the recognition of official validity of studies The Secretariat of Public Education (SEP) lists several institutions that are unaccredited in Mexico.

In August 2010, the Secretariat said 22 federal health officials were arrested after their medical and psychology licenses turned out to be fakes from a diploma mill according to the newspaper El Universal. They included the technical director of the National Center for Blood Transfusions and the chief medical officer of the National Commission for Medical Arbitration, which rules on cases of malpractice.

=== Netherlands ===
In the Netherlands it is illegal for non-accredited, non-recognized institutes to bestow any legally protected academic title. The Accreditation Organisation of the Netherlands and Flanders (NVAO) is the only agency allowed to accredit courses. Since the implementation of the Bologna process, Dutch universities have started to bestow the English titles MSc and PhD instead of their Dutch equivalents. These English versions of the title are not protected under Dutch law. A diploma mill may thus bestow someone with a PhD title without violating Dutch law, but the recipient will not be allowed to use the protected titles "doctor" or "dr."

Partnerships with foreign educational institutions are possible. This is called the "U-bocht (U-turn) construction". In this case, the curricula are neither accredited by NVAO nor recognized by the Dutch Department of Education. Graduates receive a foreign diploma issued by the educational institution which has a partnership with a Dutch educational institution. The status of such a diploma depends upon the laws and accreditation system of the country where the diploma is granted.

Diplomas from accredited universities are accepted in the Netherlands since the Bologna protocol. Diplomas from non EU institutions must be screened and validated first before they are accepted for appointments requiring a validated starting level (e.g. entering a health profession).

=== New Zealand ===
The New Zealand Education Act prohibits use of the terms "degree" and "university" by institutions other than the country's eight accredited universities. In 2004 authorities announced their intention to take action against unaccredited schools using the words "degree" and "university," including the University of Newlands, an unaccredited distance-learning provider based in the Wellington suburb of Newlands. Other unaccredited New Zealand institutions reported to be using the word "university" included the New Zealand University of Golf in Auckland, the online Tawa-Linden and Tauranga Universities of the Third Age, and the Southern University of New Zealand. Newlands owner Rochelle M. Forrester said she would consider removing the word "university" from the name of her institution in order to comply with the law.

=== Nigeria ===
The National University Commission (NUC) was formed in 1999 to clamp down on diploma mill activity in the country. A concentrated effort by the NUC has resulted in a significant drop in diploma mill activity in Nigeria. An International Higher Education article states, "Attainment of the Nigerian vision of being one of the top 20 economies by 2020 will be compromised by the injection of such poor-quality graduates into the economy. Herein lies the distaste for and the raison d'être for the government's clampdown on degree mills."

In Nigeria, online degrees from unaccredited institutions are banned and should not be accepted by employers.

=== Norway ===
Accreditation of universities and other institutions of higher education ("Universitet", "Høyskole(Høgskole)"), is governed by the state institution NOKUT, Norwegian Agency for Quality Assurance in Education. There have been cases where people submitting diplomas from a "Diploma Mill" to this agency for convalidation, have been prosecuted for fraud.

=== Pakistan ===
The government-established Higher Education Commission (HEC) is responsible for all matters related to the accreditation of universities in Pakistan. All recognized universities in Pakistan are listed on the HEC website. However, the Axact company, based in Karachi, was the subject of a 2015 investigation by the New York Times, which found it was committing fraud in other countries, by granting fake degrees and diplomas.

=== Philippines ===
Title IV (Crimes Against Public Interest), section V articles 174 and 175 of the Revised Penal Code of the Philippines criminalize the falsification of medical certificates, certificates of merit or service and the like. Article 174 imposes a penalty on anyone who produces such certificates and article 175 on anyone who knowingly procures and uses such a certificate. Despite this, news and magazine articles appear from time to time reporting businesses operating along Claro M. Recto Avenue in Manila which offer fake documents for sale.

=== Portugal ===
In Portugal according to Base Law of Educative System from 1973 Lei n.º 5/73 (Lei de Bases do Sistema Educativo) the formal establishment of a diploma mill is impossible. To award higher studies degrees, all higher studies institutions require a governmental issued licence provided by the Ministry of Science, Technology and Higher Education and published in the Government Journal (Diário da República) and communicate to the High Studies General Board (Direção Geral do Ensino Superior - DGES) all record of grades and degree awarded by students. Acting otherwise is punishable by law. Previously to 2007, in the process of opening a new institution or new curriculum to be lectured, it was required to provide the degree content by science branch and the list of PhD, MSc and BSc professors that lecture that specific course, thus getting a licence without expiration date, mandatory professors or contents revision date. This created a series of controversial scandals and severe lack of educational quality and academic integrity in some private and public institutions as evidentiated by the 2007 state run inspection at the hands of A3ES, resulting in their compulsory closure and transfer of students to other institutions. Created by governmental rule to ensure the quality in higher studies along the Bologna Process implementation, this entity has a specific and rigorous agenda to control all public and private institutions of higher studies and its content. Its job is to perform inspections every 1, 2, 3 or 5 years about the academic staff's scientific quality in every eligible educational institution, current and new curriculum in all degrees, assure that these are up to date, and control the BSc, MSc and PhD available degrees in Portugal, by closure or approval of new courses as the Bologna Process demands.

=== Romania ===
The Romanian newspaper Gândul has reported that the Dimitrie Cantemir Christian University from Bucharest started 34 Master's degree curricula which have no legal ground. According to the rector of the university, Corina Dumitrescu, the law has a loophole, since it uses a continuous present for institutional evaluation, which is uncharacteristic of the Romanian language. She says that in her opinion institutional evaluation (required by law) may also happen after the curricula have been taught. The actual wording in Romanian is "universitate acreditată supusă periodic evaluării instituționale", and Dumitrescu argues that "care se supun" means that an accredited institution can be evaluated "today, tomorrow or the day after tomorrow" (and presumably, any time), not that it needs to have been evaluated in the past. For the study year 2010-2011, 16 Master's curricula from nine of its faculties are listed as accredited in Order no. 4630/2010 of the Department of Education.

=== Russia ===
Apart from the graduate level diploma mills, in Russia a significant number of leading institutions have "degree mills" within their departments (typically humanities and economics). According to the civic initiative Dissernet such institutions are providing the Russian elite (heads of universities, members of parliament and government officials) with degrees based on plagiarised and falsified Candidate of Sciences (Ph.D) and Doctor of Sciences (habilitation) theses.

=== South Korea ===
It is illegal to falsely claim a degree in South Korea if it is not accredited. In March 2006 prosecutors in Seoul were reported to have broken up a crime ring selling bogus music diplomas from Russia, which helped many land university jobs and seats in orchestras. People who falsely used these degrees were criminally charged.

In early 2007, Shin Jeong-ah (신정아) was criminally charged for forging and misusing a degree from Yale University. The case had a far-reaching impact as she was a professor at Dongguk University and also held a position at an art gallery known to have ties with economical and political figures.

=== Spain ===
In Spain, universities and syllabi must be accredited by the National Agency for Quality Assessment and Accreditation (ANECA). Furthermore, in order to apply for an academic rank, a professor must have their curriculum accredited for said rank by this agency.

=== Sri Lanka ===
Until 1999 only state universities could grant degrees, but amendments to the Universities Act now allow private institutions to be granted degree-awarding status by the University Grants Commission. Universities can also be established by an act of parliament.

=== Sweden ===
In June 2007, the Swedish Minister for Employment, Sven-Otto Littorin, was discovered to have an MBA degree from Fairfax University. Though aware that claiming an MBA from this diploma mill would be illegal in many states in the US, Littorin tried to convince the Swedish media and people of the legitimacy of his qualification. He was eventually forced to remove the reference from his official CV, but he remained in office.

=== Switzerland ===
Qualifications, diplomas and titles earned from Swiss Federal Institutes of Technology (ETH Zurich, EPFL), from cantonal (state-run) universities, from private universities recognized by state authorities, and from Fachhochschule-institutions (Universities of Applied Sciences run or recognized by official authorities, federal and cantonal) are protected. Accreditation is conferred by the Conference of University Rectors of Switzerland (CRUS) and the Swiss Center of Accreditation and Quality Assurance in Higher Education (OAQ). Under Swiss law, it is a criminal offense, under unfair competition legislation, to profit by any unfounded academic or occupational qualifications. The private use of such a title, however, is legal. Thus, one can call oneself an LL.M., but one must not use the title when competing for clients.

=== United Kingdom ===
In the United Kingdom, degrees may only be awarded by institutions that have degree-awarding powers recognised by the UK authorities (the UK parliament, the Scottish parliament, the National Assembly for Wales or the Northern Ireland Assembly). Some institutions do not have degree-awarding powers but provide complete courses leading to recognised UK degrees that are validated by institutions which have degree-awarding powers. The UK authorities recognise those institutions which have been granted degree-awarding powers by either a royal charter, an Act of Parliament or the Privy Council. These degree-awarding institutions are known as "recognised bodies." All UK universities and some higher education colleges are "recognised bodies." If an institution is not a "recognised body" or makes degree awards not validated by such a body, it is likely to be a degree mill. It is an offence against section 214 of the Education Reform Act 1988 for any organisation to offer a degree qualification which could be taken to be that of a UK institution unless it is a "recognised body." The UK Border Agency maintains a list of institutions licensed to sponsor migrant students so that overseas students can check that they are attending an appropriate institution, and the Higher Education Funding Council for England (HEFCE) maintain a directory of higher education providers regulated in England.

Higher Education Degree Datacheck (HEDD) is an initiative sponsored by HEFCE which aims to prevent higher education fraud in the UK by maintaining a list of UK degree-awarding bodies, including name changes, mergers and antecedents since 1990.

=== United States ===
In the United States, diploma mills were very common before 1920. The country does not have a federal law that would unambiguously prohibit diploma mills, and the term "university" is not legally protected on a national level. The United States Department of Education lacks direct plenary authority to regulate schools and, consequently, the quality of an institution's degree. However, the Federal Trade Commission works to prevent fraudulent, deceptive and unfair business practices including those in the field of education and alerts United States' consumers about diploma mills by delineating some tell-tale signs in its official web page. Under the terms of the Higher Education Act of 1965, as amended, the U.S. Secretary of Education is required by law to publish a list of nationally recognized accrediting agencies that the Secretary determines to be reliable authorities on the quality of education or training provided by the institutions of higher education that they accredit. Some degree mills have taken advantage of the Establishment Clause and Free Exercise Clause of the First Amendment by representing themselves as seminaries, since in many jurisdictions religious institutions can legally offer degrees in religious subjects without government regulation.

Medical diploma mills have operated and have been blacklisted in the United States.

Although the DipScam operation in the 1980s led to a decline in diploma mill activity across the United States, the lack of further action by law enforcement, uneven state laws, and the rise of the Internet have combined to reverse many of the gains made in previous years. In 2005, the US Department of Education launched its Database of Accredited Postsecondary Institutions and Programs website to combat the spread of fraudulent degrees. A number of states have passed bills restricting the ability of organizations to award degrees without accreditation. Jurisdictions that have restricted or made illegal the use of credentials from unaccredited schools include Oregon, Michigan, Maine, North Dakota, New Jersey, Washington, Nevada, Illinois, Indiana, and Texas. Many other states are also considering restrictions on the use of degrees from unaccredited institutions.

== Research on diploma mills ==
Research into diploma mills remains limited. This is due, in part, to the clandestine nature of diploma mills and the companies that operate them. One of the most prominent investigators and educators on diploma mills and fake degrees is Allan Ezell, a now-retired FBI Special Agent who spent much of his career tracking down and prosecuting diploma mill operations in the United States. Ezell's co-authored book Degree Mills, is one of the best-known books on the topic.

There are limited amount of academic scholars researching on the topic of diploma mills. Some notable researchers include Alan Contreras, George Gollin, Sarah Elaine Eaton and Jamie Carmichael.

Research into the topic of diploma mills has showed that higher education professionals, such as university registrars and admissions staff, are often poorly trained to identify fraudulent documents by diploma mills in admissions applications. Diploma mills have also been linked to frauds in admissions, English language proficiency testing, and varsity athletics in the United States.

== See also ==
- Accepted (film)
- Author mill
- Educational inflation
- Essay mill
- Grade inflation
- Job fraud
- List of animals with fraudulent diplomas
- List of unaccredited institutions of higher education
- List of unrecognized higher education accreditation organizations
- Mickey Mouse degrees
- Ordination mill
- Predatory publishing
- Underwater basket weaving
- Vanity award
- Visa fraud
- Who's Who scam
