= List of unaccredited institutions of higher education =

This is a list of colleges, seminaries, and universities that do not have educational accreditation. In many countries, accreditation is defined as a governmental designation.

Degrees or other qualifications from unaccredited institutions may not be accepted by civil service or other employers. Some unaccredited institutions have formal legal authorization to enroll students or issue degrees, but in some jurisdictions (notably including the United States) legal authorization to operate is not the same as educational accreditation.

Institutions that appear on this list are those that are notable by Wikipedia standards and have granted post-secondary academic degrees or advertised the granting of such degrees but which are listed as unaccredited by a reliable source. There are several reasons for an institution not maintaining accreditation. A new institution may not yet have attained accreditation, while a long-established institution may have lost accreditation because of financial difficulties or other factors. Some unaccredited institutions are fraudulent diploma mills. Other institutions (for example, a number of Bible colleges and seminaries) choose not to participate in the accreditation process because they view it as an infringement of their religious, academic, or political freedom. Some government jurisdictions exempt religious institutions from accreditation or other forms of government oversight. Still other institutions are not required to have accreditation.

Some of the institutions on this list are no longer in operation. Several unaccredited universities have names that are similar to those of accredited institutions, and thus some persons may be misled into thinking that an entity is an accredited university. Accreditation is date-related: in the United States, colleges and universities are typically not fully accredited until several years after they open. Also in the United States, many colleges and universities existed prior to the development of the modern accreditation system.

There are many organizations which give their own accreditation, not generally recognised as valid by governments and others, to educational institutions. Many of these are listed in the article List of unrecognized higher education accreditation organizations. Some of the educational institutions listed here claim accreditation from such organizations.

- Adam Smith University, Liberia and Saipan
- Adams College, South Africa
- Alliance International University, Zambia
- All Saints American University, Liberia
- Almeda University, Idaho (also known as Almeda College or Almeda International University)
- American Central University, Wyoming
- American City University
- American InterContinental University)
- American Pacwest International University, Hawaii
- American State University (also known as Hamilton University and Richardson University), Hawaii and Wyoming and the Caribbean
- American University in London, England; closed in 2007
- American University of London, California
- American World University, Mississippi
- Ashwood University, Florida and Pakistan and Texas
- Atlantic International University, Hawaii (not to be confused with Atlantic University, Virginia)
- Barber-Scotia College, North Carolina (lost accreditation in 2004)
- Barrington University, Alabama
- Bay Ridge Christian College (also known as Bay Ridge College), Texas
- Belford University (not to be confused with the similarly unaccredited University of Bedford, or the legitimate University of Bedfordshire)
- Berean Bible College, California; claims approval from the unaccredited Accrediting Commission International
- Bienville University, Mississippi; reported closed as of 2007
- Breyer State University, Panama
- Bronte International University, Dakota
- Buxton University, United Kingdom; unofficially ceased operations in 2011 (not to be confused with the University of Derby's Buxton campus)
- Calvary Chapel Bible College, California
- Cambridge State University, Mississippi
- Canadian School of Management (also known as Revans University), Vanuatu
- Canterbury University, Seychelles
- Carolina University of Theology, Virginia; website states that school is accredited by Accrediting Commission International
- Chadwick University, Alabama
- Charis Bible College, Colorado; overseen by the unaccredited Transworld Accrediting Commission International
- Christ For The Nations Institute, Texas
- Christian Bible College, North Carolina
- Clarksville School of Theology, Tennessee; shut down in 1982
- Clayton College of Natural Health, Alabama
- Columbia Pacific University
- Columbia State University
- Columbus University, Mississippi; closed by state action
- Concordia College and University, Dominica
- Concordia Theologica Institute For Biblical Studies, South Carolina; closed at some point between 2017 and 2023
- Cranmer Theological House, Louisiana and Texas
- Crown College, Washington; lost accreditation in 2007
- Delta International University of New Orleans, Louisiana
- Dnyaneshwar Vidyapeeth, India
- Donsbach University, Oregon
- Dublin Metropolitan University, Cyprus
- Darul Ihsan University, Bangladesh
- Edison University, Oregon
- Emmaus Baptist College, Florida
- Fairfax University; Louisiana; closed in 2004
- Frederick Taylor International University, Hawaii and California
- Free Gospel Bible Institute, Pennsylvania
- George Wythe University, Utah
- Glencullen University, Ireland
- Golden State Baptist College, California
- Golden State University (also known as Honolulu University of the Arts, Sciences and Humanities), Hawaii (originally located in California)
- Greenwich University, London; closed in 2002 (not to be confused with the legitimate University of Greenwich)
- Hamilton University, Wyoming (also known as American State University and Richardson University); closed in 2008
- Headway University, Pakistan
- Heartland Baptist Bible College (formerly known as the Pacific Coast Baptist Bible College), Oklahoma
- Hill University, Pakistan
- Honolulu University (also known as Honolulu University of the Arts, Sciences, and Humanities and Golden State University)
- Hyles-Anderson College and Hyles-Anderson College Seminary, Indiana
- Indian Institute of Planning and Management, India
- Indiana Bible College, Indiana
- Indiana Christian University, Indiana
- Institute for Creation Research Graduate School and School of Biblical Apologetics, Texas
- Intercultural Open University Foundation, Delaware and Spain (formerly located in Nicaragua)
- International Management Centres Association (IMCA or IMC Association), Buckingham
- International University Vienna, Vienna
- IOND University, Hawaii
- Isles International University, Ireland (formerly known as the Irish International University and/or the European Business School)
- ISSEA SA, Switzerland
- James Monroe University (also called James Monroe International University)
- Kensington University, California and Hawaii; closed in 2003 by state action
- Kepler College, Washington
- Kingston College, Canada (not to be confused with the legitimate Kingston College); closed in 2006
- Klingon Language Institute, Kentucky (formerly Pennsylvania); does not seek accreditation
- Knightsbridge University, Denmark and Scotland
- Knoxville College, Tennessee; lost accreditation status in 1996
- Lambuth University, Tennessee; lost accreditation status in 2010
- LaSalle University, Louisiana
- Louisiana Baptist University (formerly Baptist Christian University)
- Madison University, Mississippi
- Management Institute of Canada
- McFord University, Pakistan
- Midtown University, Florida or Panama
- Monticello University, Hawaii and Kansas; closed in 2000
- New Testament Christian Seminary, Washington
- Oval Bible College, Louisiana; claims accreditation from the unaccredited American Accrediting Association of Theological Institutions
- Ozark Bible Institute, Missouri; loosely connected with the Assemblies of God
- Pacific International University, Missouri; originally was located in Australia
- Panworld University, probably Pakistan
- Patriot Bible University, Colorado (formerly known as Patriot University); claims accreditation by the accreditation mill American Accrediting Association of Theological Institutions
- Politecnico degli Studi Internazionali, Switzerland; closed in 2022
- Portland Bible College, Oregon
- Preston University (also known as Fairmount International University)
- Redding University
- Revans University, Vanuatu (also known as the University of Action Learning)
- Rochville University, Texas; closed in 2012 (not to be confused with the legitimate University of La Rochelle)
- Rushmore University, Cayman Islands and South Dakota
- Rutherford University (previously known as Senior University and Stratford International University)
- St. Christopher Iba Mar Diop College of Medicine, England; closed in 2011
- St. Clements University, Somalia
- St. John's University School of Medicine, Oregon
- St. John's University, Louisiana (also known as St. John's University of Practical Theology)
- St. Regis University; closed by court order in 2005 (not to be confused with the legitimate Regis University)
- Saint Theresa's Medical University, Caribbean
- Sequoia University, Los Angeles and Oklahoma; closed by court order in 1984
- Si Tanka University, South Dakota
- Silicon Valley University, California
- Suffield University, Connecticut
- Summit Theological Seminary, Indiana
- Southern University, Bangladesh
- Tennessee Bible College, Tennessee
- Thomas Jefferson Education Foundation, South Dakota
- Thompson University, Pakistan
- Thornewood University, Great Britain
- Tri-Valley University, California
- Trinity College of the Bible and Theological Seminary, Indiana
- Trinity College and University
- Trinity Southern University
- Trinity Southwest University, New Mexico
- Trump University, New York
- Tyndale Theological Seminary, Texas
- Università Popolare degli Studi di Milano, Italy (also known as Università Popolare di Milano (not to be confused with the well-known Università degli Studi di Milano)
- University Degree Program
- University of Action Learning, United Kingdom
- University of Beverly Hills, California
- University of Bums on Seats, United Kingdom (formerly known as Peckham Polytechnic University)
- University of the Holy Land, Israel
- University of the Nations (formerly known as Pacific & Asia Christian University)
- University of Northern Virginia, Virginia; closed in 2013 and unlisted in 2014
- University of NorthWest, New York
- Vision International University, California
- Warnborough College, United Kingdom
- Warren National University, Wyoming (formerly known as Kennedy-Western University); closed in 2009
- Washington International University, Pennsylvania
- Washington University of Barbados School of Medicine, Barbados; closed in 2018
- West Coast University Panama, Bangladesh
- Western Advanced Central University, Pakistan (also known as Western Central College)
- Whitefield Theological Seminary, Florida
- Woodfield University, South Carolina
- Yorker International University, South Dakota and New York (formerly known as New Yorker University)

== See also ==
- Accreditation mill
- American Biographical Institute
- Bogus colleges in the United Kingdom
- Council for Higher Education Accreditation
- Diploma mill
- Distance education
- Educational accreditation
- List of recognized accreditation associations of higher learning
- List of unrecognized higher education accreditation organizations
- List of unaccredited higher education institutions in Switzerland
- List of fictional British and Irish universities
- Nationally recognized accrediting agencies in the United States
