= Name It and Frame It? =

Book by Steve Levicoff

- Author: Steve Levicoff
- Genre: Non-fiction
- Publisher: Institute on Religion and Law
- Publication date: 1992, 1993
- Media type: Paperback
- OCLC: 27784264

Name It and Frame It? is a 1993 book by Steve Levicoff about unaccredited Christian colleges and universities, exploring the accreditation process and the nature of legitimate and illegitimate unaccredited institutions of higher education.

== Summary ==
Levicoff surveys various unaccredited Christian schools as well as providing an explanation about various forms of accreditation. Although in the past Levicoff has criticized the Transnational Association of Christian Colleges and Schools, he notes that TRACS has since "responded positively" to his earlier critiques.

Levicoff argues that a non-accredited school is not necessarily a degree mill. He devotes a chapter to "legitimate unaccredited Christian programs", some notable examples of which include (in the United States): Bob Jones University, Luther Rice University, Messenger College, (all three accredited by TRACS since publication) and (in Canada) Regent College.

Levicoff also surveys "ordination mills", of which one of the more prominent is the Universal Life Church.

The "Institute on Religion and Law", Levicoff's publisher, is a business name used for his personal consulting firm.

The fourth edition contains updated information and responses from some of the surveyed schools.

Levicoff also identifies several notable schools as suspected degree mills (page numbers identified are from the third edition); accompanying the school is an analysis of the educational programs.

- Adam Smith University
- Baptist Christian University (author notes it is "affiliated with Louisiana Baptist Theological Seminary") (page 113)
- Christian Bible College (Rocky Mount, North Carolina)
- Clarksville School of Theology (author used it as an example of a bad institution, as the author noted it was closed by decision of the Tennessee Supreme Court)
- Columbia Pacific University
- Columbia State University (Metairie, Louisiana)
- Fairfax University (New Orleans, Louisiana)
- Greenwich University (Hilo, Hawaii)
- LaSalle University (Mandeville, Louisiana)
- Summit Theological Seminary (Fort Wayne, Indiana)
- Vision Christian University (Ramona, California) ("is the successor institution to the Logos Bible College") (page 146)

== Influence ==
The Council for Higher Education Accreditation, the National Center for Science Education, the Palm Beach Post, the Seattle Times, and the New York Post have mentioned the book as a resource. The book has also been cited by numerous authors, including Julie Anne Duncan, Douglas Flather, John Bear and Allen Ezell.

== See also ==
- List of unaccredited institutions of higher education

== Bibliography ==
- Levicoff, Steve. Name it & Frame It?: New Opportunities in Adult Education and how to Avoid Being Ripped Off by" Christian" Degree Mills. Institute on Religion and Law, 1993.
