= Association of Christian Colleges and Theological Schools =

Association of Christian Colleges and Theological Schools, ACCTS, is a Christian theological "approval" board that is not recognized as an educational accreditor by the United States Department of Education (USDE). It is located in the state of Louisiana. Gary Wilson is the current president.

ACCTS holds no government license or official recognition. In the United States, recognition by the USDE or the Council for Higher Education Accreditation (CHEA) confers an academic legitimacy on accrediting organizations. A higher education institution must be accredited by an agency recognized by either the USDE or CHEA in order for the institution and its students to be eligible for government grants and student financial assistance.

In 2004, a correspondent or associate level membership could be obtained in six weeks for $100 and $200 respectively. The group charged an annual fee of $300 for "full institutional approval", which it says included a site visit and approval by an evaluation team.

== History ==
The ACCTS website says that it was founded as an approval agency for those schools which for various reasons may choose not to affiliate with a regional or other professional accrediting agency because the qualifications and standards of "such accrediting agencies may run counter to the convictions and purposes of Christian schools" and because the "external interference with internal policies by organizations or agencies with different goals and purposes than the Christian university, college or seminary may prove to be non-productive".

In 2005, Tyndale Theological Seminary (which was at that time an ACCTS member institution) was fined $173,000 for issuing degrees without meeting state standards and calling itself a "seminary" without having accreditation. Charges were dismissed in 2007 when the Texas Supreme Court ruled that the state government lacked legal jurisdiction over religious education or training.

== Requirements ==
The requirements for approval by ACCTS are: proof of the solicitation of new students, the transfer of credits, "admission policies and procedures," a "financial policy," "learning experience," a "limitation" on life credit, a library, student records, "staff," and "facilities."

== Schools approved by ACCTS ==
- California Pacific School of Theology (a.k.a. Pacific School of Theology)
- Louisiana Baptist University
- Pacific International University (a.k.a. Pacific College Incorporated and Pacific College of Graduate Studies)
- Pacific National University
- Tyndale Theological Seminary

== See also ==
- Educational accreditation
- List of unaccredited institutions of higher learning
- List of unrecognized accreditation associations of higher learning
