= Yorker International University =

U.S.-based international university

The Yorker International University is a for-profit unaccredited institution. It was formerly known as New Yorker University or The New Yorker (TNYU) (which had nothing to do with The New Yorker magazine).

== Supposed services ==
=== Supposed locations ===
It claims to have a "head office" in Rapid City, South Dakota, and a "world wide representative office" in New York City. The school has published a list of other branches, namely Buenos Aires, Argentina, Sioux Falls, South Dakota, Henderson, Nevada, Miami, Florida, Ajman, UAE, Abidjan, Ivory Coast, Accra, Ghana, Shanghai, China, Milan, Italy, Perignano di Casciana Terme Lari, Italy, Florence, Italy, Bologna, Italy. According to Italian authorities, it is unclear if those addresses are real. The organization chiefly uses two websites: www.yorker.com.ar and www.nyuniversity.info — after www.nyuniversity.net was abandoned.

=== Supposed education and degrees ===
The institution has no professors and, on the basis of life experiences, issues Master's degrees and even PhDs in several fields.

The Yorker International University also claimed to be able to issue French degrees through an alleged branch in the Ivory Coast, called "Université Internationale le Bon Samaritain" (The Good Samaritan international university). The African website www.unilebs.org is no longer active but its mirror site web.tiscali.it/unilebs/ is still reachable.

The Yorker International University also used to issue degrees in Italy through Paulo Freire University, a private university located in Nicaragua that was going to be accredited in 2002. Since the Nicaraguan university had (and still has) no authorization to issue degrees in Italy, those degrees are not valid.

=== Supposed accreditation ===
The school says its accreditation has been issued by the "Government Accreditation Association of Delaware". The Delaware Department of Education denied that this organization had ever received authorization to operate in its territory. The address of the "Government Accreditation Association of Delaware" was later moved to Washington, D.C., despite keeping the name "Delaware".

The Yorker International University is also a member of the "International University Accrediting Association" (IUAA), an accreditation mill based in California and included in the list of non-recognized accreditation agencies of Michigan. One of the school's addresses in South Dakota was also used by "Albert University" — not to be confused with Alfred University or Albert College — allegedly headquartered in Delaware and unaccredited according to the Oregon Office of Degree Authorization. The director is Marco Grappeggia, who founded other unaccredited universities such as the Università Popolare degli Studi di Milano (University of the People of Milan) and claims to be a member of the aforementioned Government Accreditation Association of Delaware.

== Regulatory opposition ==
Being on the Oregon Office of Degree Authorization's list of "unauthorized schools and invalid degrees", Italian authorities stated that the school was not recognized or accredited as an affiliation of a foreign institution, thus considering the qualifications awarded as not eligible for recognition in Italy where the school claims to have four branches.

The Italian Competition Authority convicted the Yorker International University, previously known as New Yorker University, for deceptive advertising. It also convicted a person who claimed to be a doctor through a degree from the New Yorker University, for having an invalid degree.

== See also ==
- Educational accreditation
- List of unaccredited institutions of higher learning
- List of unrecognized higher education accreditation organizations
