= Maxine Asher =

Atlantis researcher

- Born: Maxine Klein Asher; August 15, 1930; Chicago, Illinois, U.S.
- Died: March 19, 2015 (aged 84); Calabasas, California, U.S.
- Education: University of California, Los Angeles, California State University, Northridge, Walden University, University of Granada
- Occupation: Atlantis researcher
- Known for: Founder of American World University
- Spouse: married
- Children: 3

Maxine Klein Asher (August 15, 1930 – March 19, 2015) was an Atlantis researcher who founded and operated American World University, an institution which sold academic degrees, and the World Association of Universities and Colleges, an institution which "accredited" American World University, as well as other universities selling mail-order degrees which paid for accreditation by that body. Neither institution is accredited by any accrediting body recognized by the United States Department of Education.

== Personal life ==
Raised in California, Asher earned a bachelor's degree in psychology from the University of California, Los Angeles, and after graduation, worked as a public school teacher. She later returned to school and earned a master's degree in ancient history from California State University, Northridge, a doctorate in education from Walden University, and a doctorate in linguistics from the University of Granada. She was married with three children and suffered from fibromyalgia.

== Atlantis research ==
In 1973, Asher organized an expedition, sponsored by Pepperdine University, to search for the mythical continent of Atlantis off the coast of Cadiz, Spain. Consisting of 70 teachers, students, and other interested parties, the members of the expedition planned to skin dive along the coast of Spain and Morocco, seeking evidence of the lost island. Employed at the time by Pepperdine as an audiovisual instruction expert, Asher expressed confidence from the onset that the trip would be successful.

The group subsequently claimed to have discovered and photographed Atlantean artifacts. However, it was forced to seek refuge in Ireland after running afoul of the Spanish government, which believed that they were spies. Asher claimed that there were murder attempts and that at one point she was forced to jump from a moving car to evade kidnappers. She wrote an unproduced screenplay about her Spanish experiences. After arriving in Ireland, her group explored inland sites around Galway Bay, Craughwell, and the Dingle Peninsula, and conducted dives in the area of Galway Bay near the coast of the Aran Islands. These Irish investigations were conducted on the belief that ancient Irish megaliths are really the work of the Atlantean people.

Asher continued her studies of Atlantis-related topics. She was the director of the Ancient Mediterranean Research Association, an organization she co-founded with Julian Nava, and she wrote or co-wrote several books on Atlantis. Her car's vanity license plate was "ATLANTS".

Asher claimed to have psychic abilities, which she credited for helping her find Atlantis, as "the highly civilized people of Atlantis also were very psychic". According to her, Atlanteans used these psychic energies as a power source, characterizing them as being as strong as nuclear energy. She believed that the lost continent was enormous in scope, spanning the gap between Bimini and the Canary Islands, and stretching from Ireland to Newfoundland. Asher attributed its sinking to seismic upheavals, but also felt that these upheavals were the result of a cosmically ordained "Divine Retribution", a result of "negative forces" generated by its "evil" inhabitants.

She also claimed that her discoveries had been suppressed by "the Jews and the Catholics" because the discovery of Atlantis would contradict the teachings of the Bible. According to her, the cataclysm that destroyed Atlantis was the same as the Great Flood described in the Bible. She also believed that there were actually twelve Noahs who survived the flood, and not just one, with each surviving Noah going on to found one of the Twelve Tribes of Israel.

== Higher education ==
Asher is the founder of American World University, a postsecondary distance learning institution which is commonly considered to be a diploma mill. The school, which was founded in 1990, awards course credits for life experiences and does not require fluency in English. Foreign students comprise more than 90% of the "student body", which consists of approximately 7,000 people. Tuition costs vary by country, and international students are attracted through local representatives, who handle regional advertising and in return receive half of the money they generated as a finder's fee.

AWU does not have a physical campus. It was based in Iowa City, Iowa, until forced to move by the passage of new state legislation governing post-secondary institutions in 2000. AWU relocated to Rapid City, South Dakota, but was forced to move again by the creation of a similar law. It was later based in Pascagoula, Mississippi, with some operations such as the grading of papers also taking place at Asher's home in Westwood, Los Angeles, California. The school also had a branch in Brazil, where Brazilian government officials estimate that it generated revenues in excess of four million dollars over its first two years in that country.

AWU is accredited only by the World Association of Universities and Colleges, an accrediting body founded by Asher which is not recognized by the United States Department of Education. Founded in 1993, the WAUC offered accreditation to several institutions which have been classified as diploma mills by the federal government or state governments, including Lacrosse University, Columbus University, and Madison University. Neither AWU nor the WAUC are officially recognized by either the US Department of Education or the Council on Higher Education Accreditation.

Asher granted Ph.D. diplomas to several people who later enthusiastically recommended the diploma mill in its literature. For example, Dr. Adrian Waller (part-time tutor, Nihon University) wrote, "It is little wonder ... that I should speak so highly of AWU—and of Dr. Asher—for integrity, a commitment to the highest standards of post-secondary education, and to unswerving plans to remain a leader in distance learning by continuing to upgrade the concept in the years to come."

A degree-fraud expert who has worked with the FBI has described AWU as "dreadful, useless, and terrible", while a former temporary employee describes the operation as a "total fraud", stating that Asher told her to write comments on students' papers "so that students would feel like they were being read". University of California, Berkeley professor John Bear, an expert on diploma mills, has described AWU as a "mail drop".

Asher defended the academic rigor of AWU's curriculum, stating, "We're not Harvard, we're not Princeton, but I think we do a very credible job educating people." She claimed that AWU was modeled on a fusion of American and European approaches to higher education.

In 2004, Asher was forced to close down the World University of Iowa, a Hawaii-based institution similar to AWU. As part of a summary judgement, she was ordered to cease operations, refund tuition money to all students, and pay $240,000 in damages. The action was part of a statewide crackdown on unaccredited schools, as many had relocated there after 1999 in an effort to evade regulation in the mainland United States. During court proceedings, Asher refused to provide school documentation such as a list of students. Asher characterized the actions against WUI and other Hawaii-based schools accredited by the WAUC as pure harassment.

== Bibliography ==
- Discovering Atlantis. Ancient Mediterranean Research Association (unknown binding). 1974. 114 pages
- Ancient Energy: Key to the Universe. Harper & Row (unknown binding). 1979. 181 pages. ISBN 978-0060603083
- Tapping Into the Force (with Ann Miller). Hampton Roads Pub. Co. Inc. (hardcover). 1990. 194 pages. ISBN 0-9624375-2-2
- The Atlantis Conspiracy. Selene Books (paperback). 1991. 110 pages. ISBN 0-933601-20-4
- The Waves of Atlantis. Bookhenge (paperback). 1997. 136 pages. ISBN 0-7734-8525-2
