= Kole (disambiguation) =

Kole is a superhero from the DC Universe.

Kole may also refer to:

- Kole (name)
- Kolë, an Albanian masculine given name
- Kole, Democratic Republic of the Congo
- Kole District, a district in Northern Uganda
- Kole, Uganda, the principal municipality in Kole District
- Bakole language of Cameroon
- Bakole people of Cameroon
- Fr Eugene Kole OFM Conv served as Quincy University's 20th president
- KOLE, a radio station
- Kole, an early ring name of American professional wrestler Booker Huffman, better known as Booker T
