= World Association of Universities and Colleges =

Educational accreditation body

- Type: Unrecognized higher education accreditor
- President: Maxine Asher (former)

The World Association of Universities and Colleges (WAUC) is an institutional educational accreditation body not recognized by the United States Department of Education. It was run by Maxine Asher, director of the American World University, an unaccredited school. WAUC's website claims that "laws in the U.S.A. prohibit the recognition of global accreditation associations".

== History ==
According to Maxine Asher's American World University, World Association of Universities and Colleges was started in 1992.

In March 2001, WAUC was reported to be using an executive suite in Henderson, Nevada as its address.

In 2004, Asher was forced to close down the World University of Iowa, a Hawaii-based institution similar to American World University and accredited by World Association of Universities and Colleges. As part of a summary judgement, she was ordered to cease operations, refund tuition money to all students, and pay $240,000 in damages. The action came as part of a statewide crackdown on unaccredited schools, as many had relocated there after 1999 in an effort to evade regulation in the mainland United States. During court proceedings, Asher refused to provide school documentation such as a list of students.

In June 2007, the organization's website listed an address in Beverly Hills, California and WAUC listed 57 accredited schools and 28 nonaccredited "members only" schools. In 2010, it offered accreditation for limited time offer at $500.

As of September 2011, WAUC's website was offline.

In 2012, the World Association of Universities and Colleges claims "a membership of forty universities, with dozens of other worthy institutions in the process of application.".

== Schools listed as "accredited" by WAUC ==
As of 2008, WAUC listed the following as accredited members:

- Abbot Institute of Modern Sciences (United Kingdom)
- Alhuraa University (Netherlands; operated by Iraqi academics living outside of Iraq)
- American Global University School of Medicine
- American International University of Learning
- American International University of Management and Technology
- American Middle East University
- American Northeastate University
- American University of London
- American World University
- Arab Open Academy in Denmark
- Atlantic National University
- Barron University
- Bolton International University
- Buckingham College (United Kingdom)
- California University of Management Science
- Cambridge International University (Spain)
- Cambridge State University
- Central School of Professional Studies
- City School of Commerce and Technology (United Kingdom)
- City University (located in Pacific time zone; not to confused with the City University of Hong Kong, London, New York, or Seattle)
- College of Applied Sciences (United Kingdom)
- College of Management and Technology (United Kingdom)
- Columbus University
- European Business School (California; not to be confused with other schools of the same name)
- European University of Lefke
- Foundation University (Netherlands; not to be confused with Foundation University of Philippines)
- Freie Und Private Universitaet Sersi (Switzerland)
- Hegel International University
- Huntington Pacific University
- International School of Management (ISM)
- International University of America/Management Education Resource Centre (MERC Education Group)
- Keller International University
- Laureate University (United States and United Kingdom)
- Lincoln College of London (United Kingdom)
- London College of Technology and Research (United Kingdom) (accreditation in-process)
- Madison University (not to be confused with University of Wisconsin–Madison or James Madison University)
- Medical University of the Americas Belize
- Medical University of the Americas UK
- Mist University
- Royal Netherlands Academy of Arts and Sciences
- St. John's College (London)
- TEC Institute of Management
- Thompson International University
- Universal Church of the Master
- Universal Studies Academy (Gaza, Palestine, Israel)
- Universidad Central
- Universidad de los Pueblos de Europa (Spain)
- Universidad Internacional De Las Américas
- Universidad Ortodoxa de las Americas Inc. (Puerto Rico)
- Universidad y Seminano Apostilico de las Americas Inc (Puerto Rico)
- University of Central Europe (California)
- University of Global Religious Studies
- University of Health Science
- University of James
- Van Holland University (The Netherlands)
- Virtual American International University
- Washington InterContinental University
- Wisdom University
- York University (Mobile, Alabama) (not to be confused with York University of Toronto or with the University of York)

== See also ==
- Accreditation mill
- Diploma mill
- List of unaccredited institutions of higher learning
- List of unrecognized accreditation associations of higher learning
