= Berne University =

Berne University may refer to:

- University of Berne, Switzerland
- Berne University, Pennsylvania, Virginia, St. Kitts an unaccredited institution of higher education
