= North Tennessee Bible Institute =

Coordinates: 36.52973°N 87.35931°W

North Tennessee Bible Institute and Seminary is an unaccredited private Christian college originally based in Clarksville, Tennessee. It was founded in 1970-71 by Dr. William Corley, Dr. Roy Neeley and Mary McCraw. Corley was president until he died in 2008. Under Corley's leadership the interdenominational Institute offered 2- and 4-year programs leading to a "ministry license," and preparing students for Christian ministry and missionary work.

The Institute was active in sponsoring tent meeting revivals and interdenominational crusades for Christ.

In 2012 the Institute's property on Martin Luther King Boulevard in Clarksville was rezoned in order to enable it to be sold.

== Academics ==
TFBIS offers undergraduate, graduate, and doctoral programs.

== Notable alumni and faculty ==
- Mal Couch: author and founder/president of the Tyndale Theological Seminary
