= PBU =

PBU may refer to:

- Patriot Bible University, a fundamentalist Christian correspondence school located in Del Norte, Colorado
- Primitive Baptist Universalist, Christian Universalist church based primarily in the central Appalachian region of the United States
- Philadelphia Biblical University, an institution of higher learning located in Langhorne, Pennsylvania, now called Cairn University
- Pass break up, a gridiron football statistic for passes that are tipped or batted incomplete by the defense without an interception
