= Mal Couch =

American educator and Christian author (1938–2013)

Malcom Ollie "Mal" Couch Jr. (July 12, 1938, Dallas, Texas, USA – February 12, 2013) was the founder and first president of the Tyndale Theological Seminary. He was a pastor, an author of many books, and writer of 40 documentaries on Bible prophecies and biblical issues. While president of Tyndale Theological Seminary Couch recruited some very well known scholars and Bible teachers to teach the student body. Dr. Norman Geisler, Dr. Paige Patterson, Dr. Robert Lightner, Dr. Arnold G. Fruchtenbaum, and Paul Enns were used in the educational endeavors at Tyndale Seminary. After Dr. Couch retired from Tyndale Seminary he became a Vice President of the Scofield Graduate School and Seminary located in Modesto, California.

Couch was part of the Pre-Trib Study Research Group that was founded by Tim LaHaye and Thomas Ice. He was also a member of Tyndale Seminary's Conservative Theological Society.

== Education ==
Couch earned his Bachelor of Arts from John Brown University. Then he earned a Master of Arts from Wheaton College. From there he earned his Masters of Theology degree from Dallas Theological Seminary. While there Couch studied under some of the famous Dallas Dispensationalists like John Walvoord, Charles C. Ryrie, and J.D. Pentecost. He also earned a Doctor of Theology degree from Louisiana Baptist University. He also earned two additional degrees beyond his Th.D. with a D.D. and Philosophy Doctorate from Arkansas Biblical Graduate School.

As a teacher, he taught at various colleges and seminaries throughout his career. He taught at Philadelphia College of the Bible (Now CAIRN University), Moody Bible Institute, and Dallas Theological Seminary. He founded Tyndale Theological Seminary and led as its president until his retirement. He then served as Vice President of Scofield Theological Seminary as he worked with various students he mentored through various academic degrees.

== Theology ==
Couch believed the Bible to be absolute and errorless.

== John F. Kennedy reporting ==
As a young man, Couch worked in television news. While at the Dallas Theological Seminary, Couch filmed stories for WFAA-TV in Dallas. It was there he was assigned to cover President Kennedy's fateful 1963 visit. Couch was in a media car that was part of the presidential motorcade. He and other reporters heard three shots fired as they proceeded along Houston Street toward the Texas School Book Depository. They looked up in time to see the barrel of a rifle being drawn back into a window in the Depository.

== Listing of Degrees ==
- B.A., John Brown University
- M.A., Wheaton College Graduate School
- Th.M., Dallas Theological Seminary
- Th.D., Louisiana Baptist University
- D.D., North Tennessee Bible Institute
- D.R.S., Scofield Graduate School & Theological Seminary
- Ph.D., Arkansas Biblical Graduate School

== Books ==
- The Gospel Of Luke: Christ, The Son Of Man. AMG Publishers ISBN 0-89957-822-5 (2006)
- Theology: The God Of The Bible Kregel Publications (2005) ISBN 0-8254-2361-9
- Inspiration and Inerrancy: God Has Spoken AMG Publishers ISBN 0-89957-360-6 (2003)
- Blessed Hope: The Autobiography of John Walvoord, (co-author John F. Walvoord) AMG Publishers ISBN 0-89957-361-4 (2001)
- The Hope of Christ's Return: Premillennial Commentary on 1 and 2 Thessalonians AMG Publishers ISBN 0-89957-362-2 (2001)
- An Introduction to Classical Hemeneutics: A Guide to the History and Practice of Biblical Interpretation, (co-author Russell Penney) Kregel Publications ISBN 0-8254-2367-8 (2000)
- Dictionary of Premillennial Theology, Kregel Publications, 1997
- So That's How We Got the Bible, with Bob Friedman Tyndale House Publishers ISBN 0-8423-6090-5 (1973)
