= Umesh Gautam =

Indian politician

Mayor of Bareilly
- Incumbent
- Assumed office 1 December 2017

Personal details
- Born: 30 June 1970 (age 56) Uttar Pradesh, India
- Party: Bharatiya Janata Party
- Parent: K K Gautam
- Education: Università Popolare di Milano
- Profession: Mayor of Bareilly

Umesh Gautam (born 30 June 1970) is an Indian politician of the Bharatiya Janata Party (BJP). He is the Mayor of Bareilly and Chancellor of Invertis University.

== Early life and education ==
Umesh Gautam was born on 30 June 1970 in the family of K K Gautam in Uttar Pradesh, India. He has a B. Com from Hindu College, Moradabad and a PhD from the Università Popolare degli Studi di Milano, Italy.
