= Elizabeth Quat =

Hong Kong politician (born 1966)

The Honourable Elizabeth Quat BBS, JP
- 葛珮帆
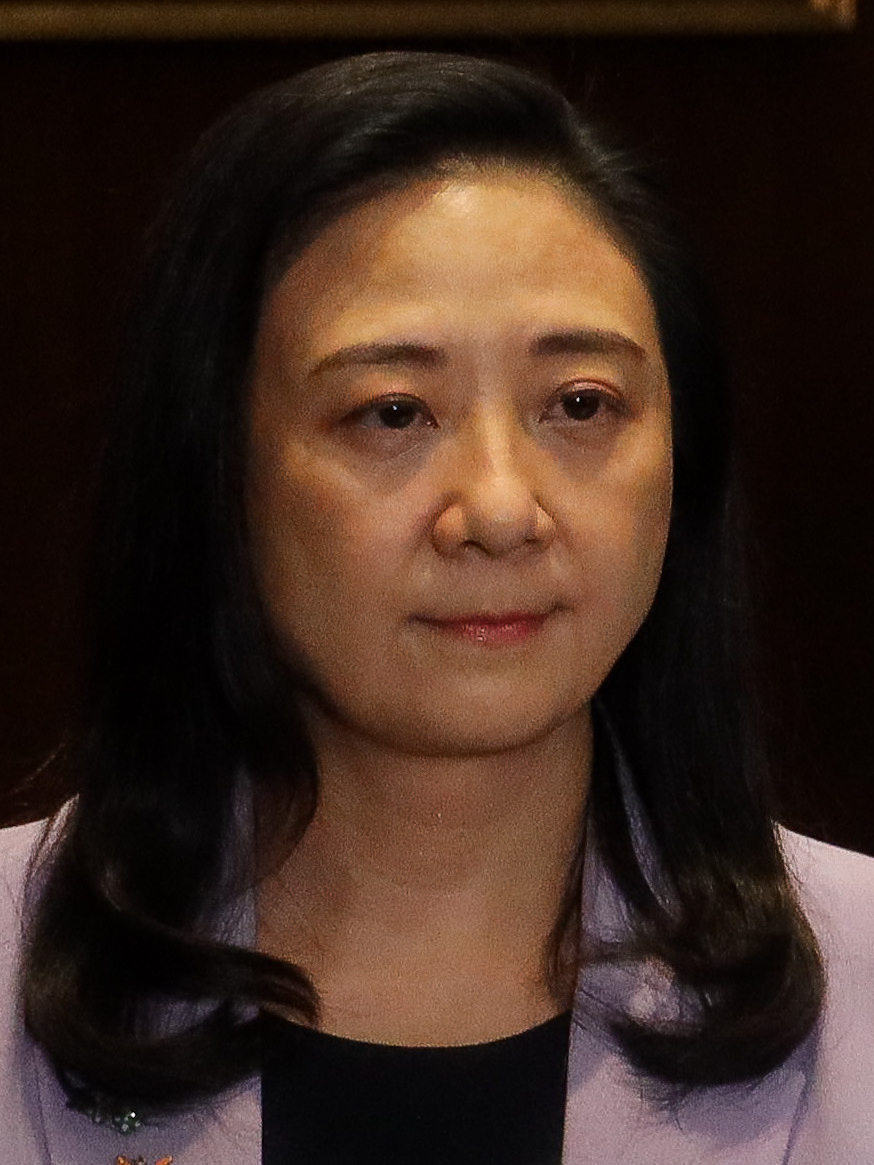
- Quat in 2023

Member of the Legislative Council
- Incumbent
- Assumed office 1 January 2022
- Preceded by: New constituency
- Constituency: Election Committee
- In office 1 October 2012 – 31 December 2021
- Preceded by: Lau Kong-wah
- Succeeded by: Constituency abolished
- Constituency: New Territories East

Personal details
- Born: 23 December 1966 (age 59) Hong Kong
- Party: DAB
- Education: Greenwich University, Hawaii (BBA, MBA, PhD)

Elizabeth Quat
- Traditional Chinese: 葛珮帆
- Simplified Chinese: 葛佩帆
Transcriptions
Standard Mandarin
- Hanyu Pinyin: Gě Pèifān
Yue: Cantonese
- Jyutping: got3 pui3 faan4

Elizabeth Quat, BBS, JP (Chinese: 葛珮帆, born 23 December 1966) is a Hong Kong politician from the pro-Beijing Democratic Alliance for the Betterment and Progress of Hong Kong. She is a co-founder of the Internet Professional Association (iProA), a director of the World Summit Award and chief executive officer of CB Strategic Investment. Quat graduated from Greenwich University, Hawaii, a defunct diploma mill.

Quat was elected in 2012 through New Territories East constituency in the Hong Kong Legislative Council. She was re-elected in 2016 through the same constituency. She was re-elected in 2021 to represent Election Committee constituency with 1,322 votes. She has also served as an elected member of the Sha Tin District Council from 2008 to 2015.

In December 2025, she was re-elected again through Election Committee constituency with 1,321 votes.

== Background ==
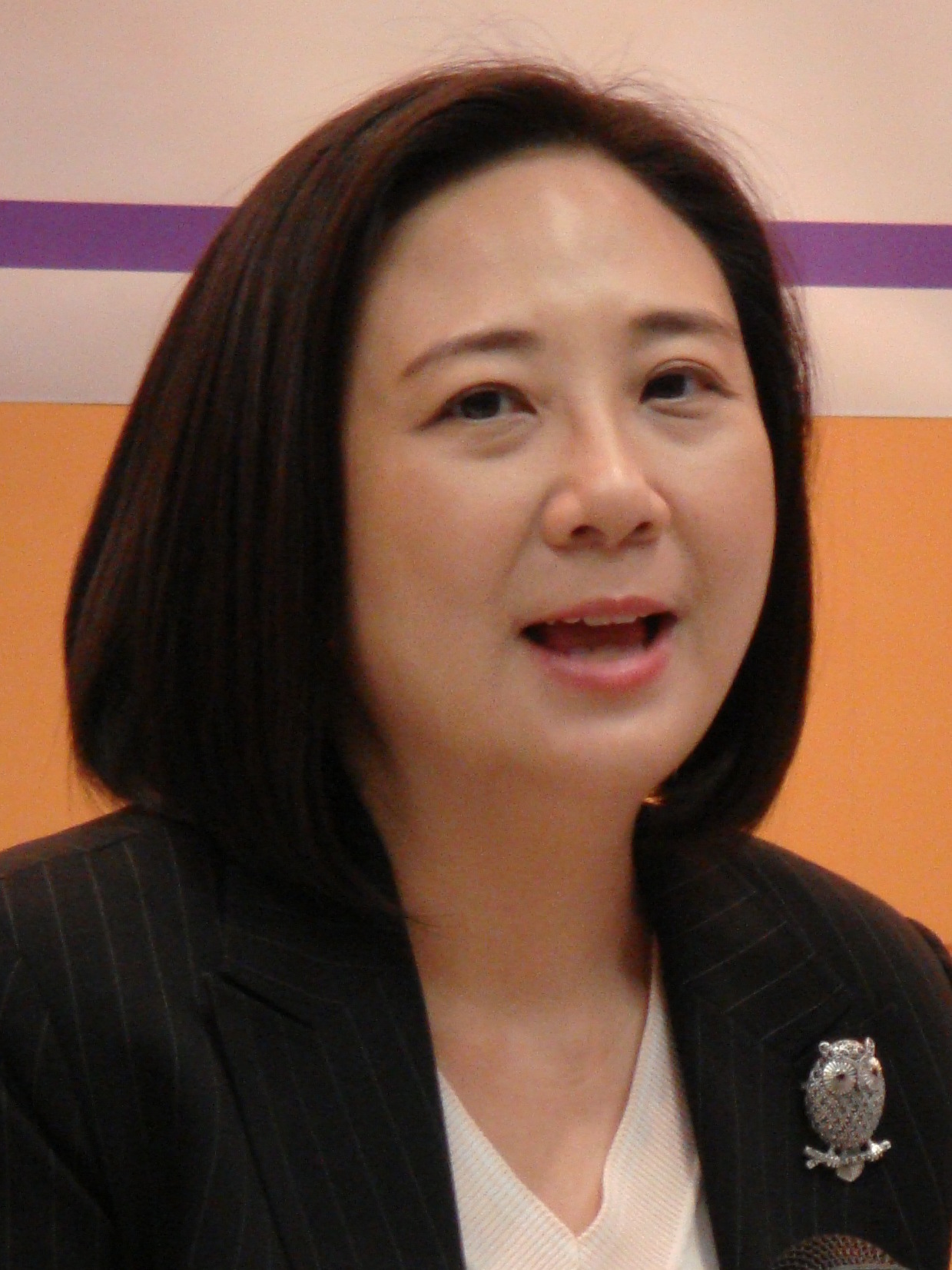
Quat in 2012

Quat received her Bachelor of Business Administration, Master of Business Administration, and Doctor of Philosophy in Management from Greenwich University, Hawaii, an unaccredited institution. In 2008, she was certified as a scuba diving instructor and is supporting photographer in a research group within the Ocean Geographic Society.

In 2000, Quat founded the Internet Professional Association and was president of the group until 2006. She became the director of World Summit Award in 2003. Quat founded the company CB Strategic Investment in 2004 and has been the CEO since then. In 2005, she help founded eHealth Consortium. She was appointed as director for Hong Kong Education City in 2006. In 2007, she found and became the president for the Energy Saving & Environment Concern Alliance. Quat also founded Green ICT Consortium in 2009 and is the chairman of the organisation.

== Career in the Legislative Council ==
In November 2020, Quat said that a face mask manufacturer was challenging the Hong Kong national security law by producing yellow-coloured masks.

In December 2020, Quat asked the government to consider a "lockdown order" for foreign domestic helpers on their day off, claiming that social distancing violations were "getting out of control" by them. In response, the Secretary for Labour and Welfare, Law Chi-kwong, dismissed Quat's idea and said that her suggestion would be inappropriate and discriminatory.

In January 2021, the Hong Kong judiciary dismissed Quat's idea, in which she suggested that a council should be used to determine criminal sentencing due to a perceived lack of consistency in penalties. The judiciary responded that current appeals and reviews were effective. In February 2021, it was reported that Quat again criticized the judiciary, claiming that the Department of Justice was not making progress in prosecuting those arrested under the National Security Law.

In February 2021, Quat said that BBC produced "fake news" that discredited mainland China's government, and that BBC deserved to have their programming dropped by RTHK. Later, Quat said that RTHK had issues and was "left unsupervised" under its former Director of Broadcasting, Leung Ka-wing. In contrast, the RTHK's Programme Staff Union stated that they had serious doubts about the new director, Patrick Li, and that the government had made moves to strip editorial independence from RTHK.

In April 2021, Quat stated that the COVID-19 situation in India was out of control, and that flights from there to Hong Kong should be restricted, despite a mandatory 21-day hotel quarantine for inbound passengers.

In December 2021, it was reported that Quat was eligible to vote four times in the 2021 Hong Kong legislative election, yielding 0.0475578% of the total voting value (elected seats), which is 9569 times more than the value of an average voter's total voting value.

On 5 January 2022, Carrie Lam announced new warnings and restrictions against social gathering due to potential COVID-19 outbreaks. One day later, it was discovered that Quat attended a birthday party hosted by Witman Hung Wai-man, with 222 guests. At least one guest tested positive with COVID-19, causing all guests to be quarantined.

In July 2022, Quat proposed legislation to prohibit insulting people, stating "There are views pointing out that a number of incidents involving insulting other persons have happened in Hong Kong in recent years. Such acts not only trample on other persons' dignity and damage their reputation, but also encourage the trend of bullying in the community. Moreover, it is learnt that quite a number of public officers, while discharging duties, have experienced they themselves and their family members being insulted."

In February 2023, when talking about foreign domestic helpers, Quat said she heard complaints and that "If it's not about job-hopping, it's that they don’t match their product descriptions. Let’s not say 'product,' but they come to Hong Kong and they don't know how to do any of the things they said they could do. Domestic workers' contracts, and domestic worker policies, only help the domestic worker. They don’t help the employers."

In July 2023, after the government lost at an attempt to ban the song Glory to Hong Kong, Quat said that the government should keep trying to ban the song.

== Honours ==
Quat received Ten Outstanding Young Persons and Ten Outstanding Young Digi Persons awards in 2001, and named The Most Successful Women 2002. She was awarded the Bronze Bauhinia Star by the Hong Kong SAR Government in 2017.

Political offices
Preceded by Stephen Fong	Member of the Sha Tin District Council; Representative for Chung On; 2008–2015	Succeeded by Yip Wing
Legislative Council of Hong Kong
Preceded by Lau Kong-wah	Member of Legislative Council; Representative for New Territories East; 2012–2021	Constituency abolished
New constituency	Member of Legislative Council; Representative for Election Committee; 2022–present	Incumbent
Order of precedence
Preceded by Ip Kin-yuen; Member of the Legislative Council	Hong Kong order of precedence Member of the Legislative Council	Succeeded by Poon Siu-ping; Member of the Legislative Council
