= Greenwich University (disambiguation) =

Greenwich University is an informal name for the University of Greenwich, United Kingdom, a historic university in London.

It may also refer to:

- University of Greenwich
- Greenwich University, Karachi, a recognized degree-awarding university in Karachi, Pakistan
- Greenwich University (Norfolk Island), a controversial distance learning institution founded in Missouri which later moved to Hawaii, then to Norfolk Island
