= CIMEA =

CIMEA is an acronym that may refer to:

- Information Centre on Academic Mobility and Equivalence,
- International Committee of Children's and Adolescents' Movements
