= UniPoliSi =

- Other name: PoliSI
- Former name: IPUS
- Type: Unaccredited
- Active: 2012–2018
- Location: Switzerland
- Language: Italian
- Website: www.unipolisi.eu (inactive)

The UniPoliSI, formerly known as IPUS and Politecnico degli Studi Internazionali PoliSI (Polytechnic University of International Studies), was an unaccredited distance learning, proprietary, for-profit university previously located in Chiasso (Ticino), Switzerland, and later in Disentis (Switzerland).

The institution had no campus and issued degrees mostly based on "life experiences", though supplementary examinations may be required. The school issued Bachelor's, Master's, and even PhDs in several fields (engineering, economics, law, computer science, physical therapy, nursing school), but most students were Italians working in construction surveying (geometri) who wanted a faster degree in civil engineering without attending Italian institutions. In Italy, the same kind of unaccredited university would be illegal.

Following the closure of IPUS in Chiasso and the confirmation of its bankruptcy by the Federal Supreme Court of Switzerland in 2017, its management rebranded and relocated operations to Disentis in the canton of Grisons under the name UniPoliSI. Prosecutors in Ticino subsequently launched a criminal investigation into the management of both entities. In November 2018, the Criminal Court of Lugano found director Vincenzo Amore and his former partner guilty of aggravated fraud and criminal mismanagement for defrauding students and misappropriating institutional funds, sentencing Amore to 26 months in prison. Vincenzo Amore, director of UniPoliSi, was arrested in February 2018 for running the fake universities IPUS and UniPoliSi with his wife. He was later sentenced to three years.

== See also ==
- List of unaccredited institutions of higher learning
- Educational accreditation
