= Kole (name) =

Kole is both a given name and a surname. Notable people with the name include:

== Given name ==
- Kole Ayi (born 1978), American football player
- Kole Calhoun (born 1987), American baseball player
- Kole Čašule (1921–2009), Macedonian writer
- Kole Heckendorf (born 1985), American football player
- Kole Nedelkovski (1912–1941), Macedonian revolutionary
- Kole Omotoso (1943–2023), Nigerian writer
- Kole Rašić (1839–1898), Serb revolutionary

== Surname ==
- Amber Kole (born 1986), American pair skater
- André Kole (1936–2022), American magician
- Emmanuel Mate Kole (1860–1939), Ghanaian politician
- Eugene Kole, American official
- Hilary Kole, American jazz singer
- Nicholas Kole (born 1983), American pair skater
- Warren Kole (born 1977), American actor

== See also ==
- Kolë
- Cole (name)
- Kohl (surname)
