= Alliance International University =

De-registered university

The Alliance International University (AIU) is an unaccredited university in the Caribbean, which formerly operated from Lusaka, Zambia. It has been described as "an online scam" by Undark Magazine. It has no physical campus and all its activities take place online.

It was de-registered by the Higher Education Authority (HEA) in April 2018 for offering substandard education.
