= St. John's University School of Medicine =

Unaccredited online medical school

St John's University School of Medicine was a medical school operated by Daniel and Barbara Harrington and their company Interactive Technology Group, Inc. (ITG) of Eugene, Oregon, which was supposedly based in Montserrat, West Indies. It offered online distance education courses such as Neuro Anatomy, Lung Pathology, Cat Lab and Lab Animal Science trainer for a monthly subscription fee, as well as some classes which were taught in Klamath Falls, and Eugene, Oregon. The school is not accredited by any recognized accreditation body. As such, its degrees may not be acceptable to employers or other institutions, and use of degree titles may be restricted or illegal in some jurisdictions.

In July 2000, the State of Oregon Department of Justice issued a restraining order and filed a lawsuit to close down the school The lawsuit alleged that school's legal status and medical curriculum had been misrepresented to students and prospective students. Though it claimed to be accredited through St Christopher's College of Medicine of Dakar, Senegal, and Luton, England, according to Oregon authorities, the school was not accredited in Montserrat nor was it accredited through St Christopher's College of Medicine, and it did not offer a curriculum that would qualify students to meet requirements for U.S. medical licensure. The state sought civil penalties, restitution to students, attorneys' fees and investigative costs, and to permanently prohibit the Harringtons from conducting business in Oregon.
