= Patriot Bible University =

Unaccredited Independent Baptist correspondence school in Del Norte, Colorado

Coordinates: 37°40′16.3″N 106°20′49″W

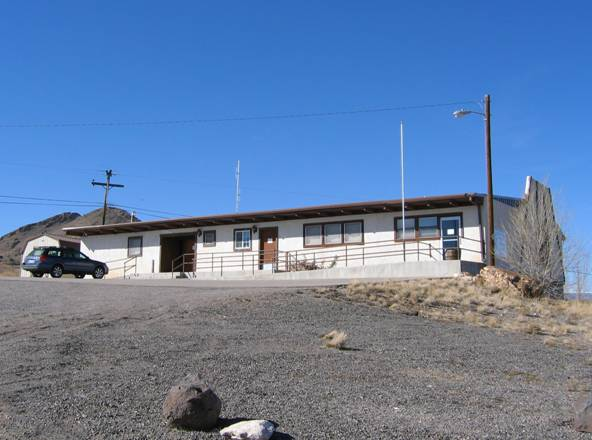
- Former names: Patriot University
- Type: Diploma mill, unaccredited distance education
- Established: 1979
- Affiliations: Independent Baptist
- Chancellor: Bill Knight
- President: Wayne Knight
- Executive Director: Lonnie Skinner
- Location: 1135 French St., Del Norte, Colorado, United States
- Registrar: Toni Skinner
- Website: www.patriotuniversity.com and www.patriotuniversity.org

Patriot Bible University (PBU), formerly known as Patriot University, is an unaccredited Independent Baptist correspondence school located in Del Norte, Colorado, which issues religious degrees only. According to the State of Colorado, Patriot's "degrees or diplomas have no state recognition". PBU is not accredited by any agency recognized by the Department of Education. It has been called a diploma mill, lacking sufficient academic standards to award degrees.

== History ==
In 1979, Patriot University was established at the Dallas, Texas home of school founder Lonnie Skinner. Then in 1985 it became affiliated with the now defunct Hilltop Baptist Church in Colorado Springs and became "an external studies mission of Hilltop Baptist Church". Beginning in March 1988, the State of Colorado Higher Education Commission gave Patriot "Religious Authorization", which they define as "[a] bona fide religious postsecondary educational institution which is exempt from property taxation under the laws of this state and whose degrees or diplomas have no state recognition". In 1993, its address was listed as 6915 Palmer Park Blvd in Colorado Springs, with Wayne Knight as President and Director. This is the address of Hilltop Baptist Church, which was founded in the late 1970s by Bill Knight; the current pastor is his son Franklin “Wayne” Knight. The current PBU president is Wayne Knight and Bill Knight is PBU chancellor. In 1993, admission requirements included that applicants must be "Bible believing Christians".

In 1997, Patriot's street address was also listed as the residential address of Lonnie Skinner. In 2004, Skinner, previously a student at the unaccredited Baptist Christian College, "announced his early retirement (at age 56) as pastor of College Heights Baptist Church" after nine years. In July 2004, the school changed its name to Patriot Bible University and moved out of College Heights Baptist Church and into a building in Del Norte, Colorado, a small town of 1,700 people. According to property records, Hilltop Baptist Church bought the Patriot building, which was valued at $232,495; it currently has tax exempt status.

In 2006, Patriot wrote that "Hilltop Baptist Church of Colorado Springs is our sponsoring organization." Also in 2006, it said it had about 400 active, distance learning based students, and issued approximately 50 to 100 Christian religious degrees (Bachelor's, Master's and Doctorates) per year. In 2007, it had a total of four employees.

In November 2011, PBU's President and Hilltop Baptist pastor Wayne Knight was arrested on four counts alleging that he knew about his niece molesting a child at Hilltop Baptist School, but "failed to comply with a state law requiring them to report it to law enforcement". According to court affidavits, Knight "displayed a consistent pattern to manipulate and control the situation—not only among the faculty at Hilltop Baptist School—but also among parent [sic?], church members and students" and "[t]he pastor also allegedly lied about having conducted a lie detector test." Also in November 2011, Hilltop Baptist Church was sued by parents and teachers who reported cases of sex abuse to Knight, who told the employees he had "previous knowledge about the matter and promised to investigate," but instead fired the employees a month later. In February 2012, Knight took a plea deal where he "pleaded guilty to being an accessory to a crime and failure to report suspected child abuse," and planned to move to Texas. In 2010, Hilltop Baptist School closed after enrollment dropped. In 2012, Hilltop Baptist Church was closed. In 2013, the teacher pleaded guilty to sexual assault.

== Accreditation ==
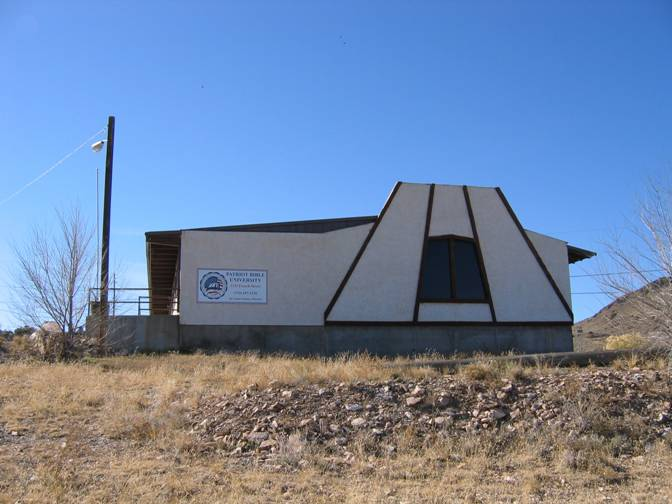
Profile view of Patriot Bible University taken on November 22, 2006.

In Name It and Frame It? New Opportunities in Adult Education and How to Avoid Being Ripped Off by 'Christian' Degree Mills, Steve Levicoff labeled Patriot Bible University a degree mill.

The university is not accredited by any recognized accreditation associations of higher learning. As of 2007, it was recognized by the American Accrediting Association of Theological Institutions (AAATI), which itself has no recognition from the United States Department of Education or any other government educational organization. The AAATI is itself considered an accreditation mill, and provides approval to schools for a $100 charge. In October 2008, it was accredited by Accrediting Commission International. The ACI is again not recognized by the US Department of Education.

== Tuition, requirements, and criticism ==
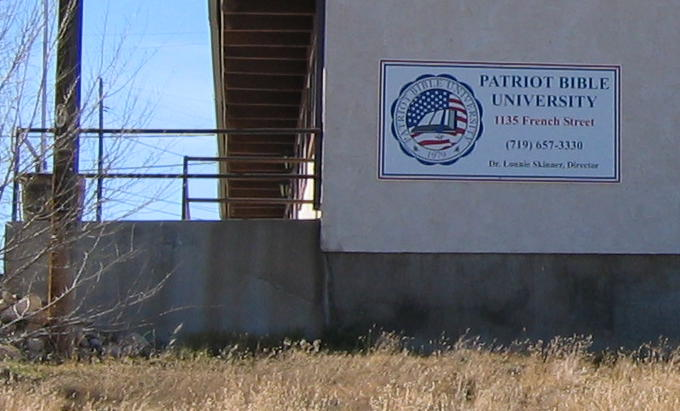
Close up profile view of Patriot Bible University taken on November 22, 2006.

Critics have charged that Patriot Bible University is a diploma mill as it has unreasonably low graduation requirements, lack of sufficient faculty or educational standards, and a suspicious tuition scheme, among other issues. The college itself has claimed that it simply does not "choose" to be accredited by standard associations. The school's current policies allow students with previous college credits to attain bachelor's degrees, master's degrees and even "Doctor of Ministry" degrees in months, rather than years, for as little as $38 per month plus books. The university offers a monthly fee, unlike most universities, which only charge per-credit fees. Patriot allows students to "prepay" for degrees (such as, D.Min. fully pre-paid, $1,899) and for those who already have a degree they "are required to complete only 12 courses for the Bachelor of Arts level". It has offered buyer discounts, such as "when you place an order for four courses at one time, one of them will be free!" The school's catalog contains course descriptions but no listing of the school's faculty or their credentials. The school teaches Young Earth creationism.

Patriot Bible University is divided into three schools—College of Ministerial Studies, College of Christian Education, and Patriot School of the Bible. The College of Ministerial Studies and College of Christian Education offer Christian Bible degrees at the undergraduate and graduate degree levels. Patriot School of the Bible offers Bible diplomas, certifications, ministry and leadership training, and continuing education.

=== Kent Hovind ===
Much of the criticism of Patriot is leveled at the controversial creationist evangelist Kent Hovind, who received M.A. and Ph.D. degrees at Patriot in 1989 and 1991, both in Christian education. Hovind's use of the title Doctor in particular has provoked interest and subsequently, scrutiny of his education credentials as well as his dissertation.

Doctoral dissertations from reputable institutions are published by the awarding institution and generally lodged with university libraries, as well as being made available to other scholars conducting research in similar areas. However, Patriot will not supply copies of Hovind's doctoral dissertation except with his permission. Karen Bartelt, an organic chemistry professor who debated Hovind, wrote that she viewed a copy on file at the National Center for Science Education (NCSE), but the organization cannot distribute it due to copyright restrictions. The NCSE's copy was received from Skip Evans who obtained Hovind's dissertation from Patriot with Hovind's permission in March 1999.

Critics have described Hovind's dissertation as incomplete, of low academic quality, poorly written, poor in spelling, and of ungrammatical style. The lack of quality was ascribed, in part, to the fact that "the pages are not numbered; there is no title; of sixteen or so chapters in the index only the first four are finished; misspellings are rampant (immerged for emerged, epic for epoch, and tentable for testable are three examples); and the single illustration was apparently cut out of a science book with scissors and fastened to the thesis with glue or tape." Hovind's dissertation was approved by one person, Wayne Knight, who was and remains president of Patriot.

Patriot has posted Hovind's religious testimony on its website and posted a defense of him. In Patriot's school catalog, Hovind is quoted as saying "It was the study for my dissertation that opened so many doors of opportunity for me to preach." In 2010, Patriot responded to WikiLeaks' posting of Hovind's dissertation. Patriot wrote the posting was not the "finished" product, but because they do not "retain ownership to student thesis' [sic] or dissertations, as is commonly practiced by many schools," they "cannot release student work to the public".

== See also ==
- List of unaccredited institutions of higher learning
- List of unrecognized accreditation associations of higher learning
