= Golden State Baptist College =

College in Santa Clara, California

Coordinates: 37.3872°N 121.9448°W

- Golden State Baptist College
- Type: Private Bible college
- Established: 1996
- President: Dr. Jack Trieber
- Administrative staff: 38
- Undergraduates: 372
- Location: Santa Clara, California, US
- Mascot: Bear
- Website: www.gsbc.edu

Golden State Baptist College (GSBC) is an unaccredited independent Baptist Bible college in Santa Clara, California, offering bachelor's degrees and master's degree programs in fields related to Christian ministry.

== Programs ==
Programs offered are intended to lead students into the work of the ministry as pastors, assistants, missionaries, teachers, musicians, and the financial side of the Christian ministry. Unaccredited bachelor's degrees are offered in pastoral theology, pastoral assistant, missions, Christian ministries, music education, Christian education (elementary and secondary), and secretarial science. Unaccredited master's degree programs are also offered.

== Accreditation status ==
Golden State Baptist College, like most Independent Fundamental Baptist Bible colleges, has chosen to maintain its independence from secular authorities by deliberately refraining from seeking or accepting accreditation. Thus, it is not accredited by any recognized accreditation body. As such, its degrees and credits earned are not recognized as valid to most potential employers or other educational institutions.

== Rules ==
GSBC's Institutional Distinctives can be found on their website. The school promises to deny admission to applicants who are from "charismatic, 'Bible' church, 'Christian' church, non-denominational, or inter-denominational" churches. Another rule states that "The King James Version is the only English-language Bible that will be permitted on campus." The administration "stand[s] against the destructiveness of para-church organizations", a reference to Christian ministries not operating under the authority of a local church.

The General Information section highlights more rules for students. It states that "the activities on campus, the dormitory life, and the entire program of the college require the full participation and cooperation of every student." Students must attend North Valley Baptist Church, unless an active member of another "local, fundamental Baptist church" before applying to the school. Even then, the student "must first obtain special administrative approval in order to attend his home church while enrolled at GSBC." Attendance at the daily chapel service is required. "Golden State Baptist College students are expected to go soul winning for a minimum of three hours per week." Christian service of all students (such as teaching Sunday school classes, working on bus routes, or participating in the music ministry) "is required by the administration."

Dating is limited to "church dates" as well as planned activities on or off campus with chaperones. The campus is equipped with a "dating parlor" with arranged chairs and tables for activities and seating. Physical contact is prohibited, and intercourse is grounds for expulsion, and things such as kissing are also grounds for severe punishment.

Students must have their music choices approved by staff members. Any "secular music" is prohibited. If any is found, prompt removal will be requested by staff. A computer lab is provided on campus for students to utilize during assigned hours of operation, however students are also allowed to use the college's provided wifi within the rules that are given in the rule book (no video streaming, games, pornography, etc.)

Curfew for students is 10:30pm. Floor leaders perform routine "lights out" checks at 11:00 PM, however if a student is out at work they are allowed to be out as late as 1 AM.

== North Valley Publications ==
North Valley Publications (NVP) is based at Golden State Baptist College, and is affiliated with North Valley Baptist Church. North Valley Publications is a small publisher that specializes in books on Christian living and Church leadership. Many of the books published by NVP are written by the college's chancellor, Dr. Jack Trieber.

== See also ==
- List of unaccredited institutions of higher learning
- Educational accreditation
