= ISSEA =

Unaccredited institution of higher education

- Other names: many
- Former names: Politecnico di Studi Aziendali and others
- Type: Unaccredited
- Established: 1987
- Parent institution: I.S.S.E.A. SA
- Officer in charge: Massimo Silvestri
- Rector: None (previously: Fausto Cardano, Gregory Overton Smith)
- Director: Massimo Silvestri
- Location: Zug, Geneva (previously: Lugano, Agno, Roveredo), Switzerland; 47.1774159°N 8.5160639°E
- Campus: None
- Language: Italian
- Website: www.ateneosupdi.ch and many others

ISSEA is a group of unaccredited for-profit diploma mills owned by Massimo Silvestri, which use many invented names and originated from the now defunct Politecnico di studi aziendali di Lugano Unipsa (Polytechnic University of Business Studies). The goal of the organization is to sell unaccredited Italian online degrees; however, since unaccredited degrees are illegal in Italy, the sole trader usually operates from bordering Italian-speaking areas of Switzerland.

Due to court orders, some of ISSEA's websites may now be offline, permanently or temporarily.

== Parent company: I.S.S.E.A. SA ==
I.S.S.E.A. SA, "Istituto superiore di scienze economiche e aziendali" (Higher institute of economics and management), is a sole proprietorship owned by Massimo Silvestri, which claims to operate on the basis of the economic freedom and scientific freedom guaranteed in Title 2 of the Swiss Federal Constitution (art. 27 and art. 20), but it is not accredited by the Rectors' Conference of the Swiss Universities (CRUS). It was established in 1987, offering unaccredited degrees through its Politecnico di studi aziendali Unipsa (Polytechnic University of Business Studies, Unipsa) in Lugano and Agno.

Despite being based in Switzerland, with an alleged branch in San Marino, the organization has Italian landlines and the owner only speaks Italian because the degrees are offered to Italians from Switzerland, as unaccredited universities are illegal in Italy.

Although the director/founder/owner Massimo Silvestri (also going by Massimo Maria Pietro) is not a current member of the Swiss Bar or Italian Bar, he introduces himself as an attorney, using the Italian "avv." title.

== Degrees ==
The organization has no campus, no professors and no staff, and issues degrees based on life experiences and optional online learning courses, namely Bachelor's, Master's, and even Doctoral degrees.

== Legal disputes ==
=== Politecnico di studi aziendali ===
ISSEA and the Politecnico di studi aziendali of Lugano were also not accredited by the Department of Education, Culture and Sports of Ticino. ISSEA SA has been denied accreditation by the Federal Administrative Court of Switzerland, too. The same federal court permanently banned ISSEA and its Politecnico di studi aziendali from the European Erasmus Programme because of their unaccredited status. Since January 1, 2015, the usage of the words "polytechnic" and/or "university" by unaccredited institutions has been declared illegal by the Canton of Ticino, which is why the Politecnico di Studi Aziendali and ISSEA had to leave Ticino and moved to Roveredo.

In 1993, the Italian Ministry of Education included the Politecnico di studi aziendali in a list of private institutions which are not allowed to issue valid academic qualifications.

In 2007, the Italian Competition Authority convicted ISSEA and Massimo Silvestri in absentia of deceptive advertising.

ISSEA used to be a member of the general assembly of EMUNI University so it could receive European public funds, such as €50,000 in 2012 through INPDAP, although Switzerland is not in the European Union.

In 2016, the Canton of Grisons' parliament asked to stop the company from operating even in the new location of Roveredo. A few months later, the unaccredited school moved to the Canton of Zug. During this period, the organization created a website called SUPDI, which claimed to be a university, very similar to the name SUPSI of a real Swiss university located in Ticino.

In the same year, in the tribunal of the Canton of Ticino, the company was convicted of unauthorized use of protected names ("university", "polytechnic" etc.).

In 2018, a final ruling of the Italian Council of State held that ISSEA SA and all its alleged universities are not recognized in Italy or in Switzerland and their degrees have no value. ISSEA had taken a legal action against the Ministry for University Instruction and Research and against the Ministry of the Interior, which would not let ISSEA create an Italian branch — called "ISSEA Campus Italia" — of the alleged Swiss university. The court stated that ISSEA is not allowed to purport to be an academic institution.

In 2021, a Neapolitan court found out that a student who was going to receive a master's degree from the University of Naples Federico II had a bachelor's degree issued by one of ISSEA's institutions: since the bachelor's degree was invalid, the court revoked his graduate and undergraduate careers and stopped him from defending his thesis.

In 2026, Politecnico di studi aziendali claims to have reopened in Cham, Switzerland and to be authorized to issue degrees originating from Colombia and Ecuador.

== Other names ==
After the Swiss authorities declared the name "Politecnico di studi aziendali" illegal, the institution's ads started to use different names as well, such as Polotecnico di studi aziendali (only one vowel was changed) or Polo Tecnico di studi aziendali (literally: Technical research center of business studies) www.unipsa.net/www.uni-psa.ch, Unipsa, I.S.S.E.A. sa Scuola Universitaria Privata a Distanza, C.I.S.M.A.D. (Centro Italiano Studi Multidisciplinari a Distanza) www.cismad.it, unisupdi.ch/unipfh.ch or SUPDI—not to be confused with SUPSI, an accredited Swiss university (only one letter has been changed).

An old website called "Private University Consortium" (www.umc-puc.edu), created in 1999 and deactivated in 2006, also sold degrees from Gibraltar under the name of "Università Mons Calpe", from Colorado under the name of "American Business School LLC", and from Panama under the name of "University Europanamense". The consortium was supposed to be headquartered in the same office as the Politecnico di studi aziendali in Ticino. All the institutions were unaccredited and all the offices no longer exist.

=== Ateneo SUPDI ===
SUPDI, also known as Ateneo Supdi (literally: Supdi Athenaeum), was created by Massimo Silvestri in 2018 cloning the website of a real Swiss university named SUPSI. It has an alleged registered office in Baarerstrasse 82 6300 Zug, which is actually a PO box shared with other diploma mills owned by Silvestri. Starting in 2025, it also claims to have a registered office in Geneva. The first websites supdi.ch and unisupdi.ch were later shut down by a court ruling; however, the website is now online again using the new domains unisupdi.education and ateneosupdi.ch. SUPDI also claims to have a branch in San Marino — although the University of the Republic of San Marino is the only recognized institution — and another branch in Milan, Italy in the form of an unaccredited folk high school, according to the websites unigui.it and uni-issea.ch (the latter is now inactive).

=== Univolta Università Telematica Privata Alessandro Volta and others ===
As of 2017, the institution is also being advertised as Univolta Università Telematica Privata Alessandro Volta (Online Private University Alessandro Volta) www.univolta.ch, using the same address and/or P.O. box in Zug and the same domain name as the Politecnico di Studi Aziendali www.unipsa.ch—whose name has been declared illegal by Swiss authorities—as well as Atena Unitelematica scuola universitaria www.uniatena.ch (Telematic university Athena), Hochschule Nikola Tesla (Nikola Tesla University) www.unitesla.ch/www.uniteslaweb.net, Unitelematica Leonardo da Vinci (Telematic university Leonardo da Vinci) unitelematicadavinci.ch, Unitelematica Ginevra Institut D'études Académiques HEPG www.unihepg.ch. The website www.unipsa.net, which was used by the aforementioned "Polo Tecnico di studi aziendali", was also used by SUPDI.

== See also ==
- Educational accreditation
- List of unaccredited institutions of higher learning
- List of universities in Switzerland
