= Institute of Technological Studies =

Private degree awarding institution

The Institute of Technological Studies (ITS) is a private degree awarding institution situated in Colombo, Sri Lanka. 7 Kirimandala Mawatha, Colombo - 5. It offers degree programs for undergraduates, especially transfer programs such as 2+2 or 3+1 for undergraduates who want to transfer to the United States, Canada or other countries.

As the government universities of Sri Lanka only accept 5-10% of the students who sit for the local G.C.E. Advance level examination, there was a question mark for the rest of students’ higher educations. After the political issues the Institute of Technological Studies was approved under the Section 25 A of the Amended University Act No. 16 of 1978 on 15 December 1988.

The Institute of Technological Studies was established in 1984 (41 years ago) as a private university on a 4.5-acre (18,000 m^{2}) plot of land in the heart of Colombo, founded by Dr. Edirisinghe, the president of ITS. In June 1985, ITS started to offer B.S degree in Computer science in affiliation with the University of Houston–Clear Lake. It became the first institute in Sri Lanka to offer business degrees in 1987 by creating a business administration faculty.

Since 1991, the institute has expanded its activities by offering the first three years of the majority of the bachelor's degrees offered in US universities.

The Troy University in Troy, Alabama has joined with The ITS by offering the entire Computer Science and Business Administration degree to the Sri Lankan students. The degree obtained in ITS will be exactly the same as one gained at University.

The ITS campus facilities include a canteen, recreation facilities and landscaped grounds and benches that allow for socialization between classes.

ITS established OASIS Hospital in the year 2000 with intention of setting up a medical school affiliated to the ITS. OASIS Hospital is located in the healthcare hub of the Colombo City and very close in proximity to Apollo Hospital Colombo. It is a modern multi-storey complex sprawled over 4.5 acres (18,000 m^{2}) wooded land in the Colombo.

In May 2009, ITS announced that it had formed a partnership to open a branch campus of St. Theresa's Medical University (St. Kitts) in Colombo, Sri Lanka beginning in June 2009, with approximately 75 students, for which STMU claimed to have government approval. These plans ended when STMU closed in August 2009."Health Education Associates Unlimited, Inc.", the investment firm promoted by STM Founder and Chancellor M. Thomas Uhrin and STMU President and CEO Jeffrey T. Irwin to finance the Sri Lanka and Italy expansions, folded in 2009, leaving investors unpaid. A former US Attorney who examined the firm's agreements characterized it as fitting the characteristics of a Ponzi scheme; in December 2009, Uhrin denied that it was a plan to defraud investors.
