= Cambridge State University =

Unaccredited university in the United States

Cambridge State University was a diploma mill, formerly operated in Shreveport, Louisiana, and Hawaii, then relocated to Mississippi, which offered university-level degrees via distance education. It is not a state school but a proprietary private university.

In 1998, the Attorney General of Louisiana won court orders to close down Cambridge State University and Columbia State University, both as illegal diploma mills.

In February 1999, the State of Hawaii obtained a court judgment against Cambridge State University requiring that it cease advertising itself as being accredited or as being accredited by the World Association of Universities and Colleges or any other agency not recognized by the U.S. Department of Education, refund tuition money paid by students who had been misled to think it was an accredited educational institution, and pay a fine to the state.

As of June 2007, the Mississippi Commission on College Accreditation listed Cambridge State as a "non-approved entity" located in Jackson, Mississippi.

In 2004, a school district in Michigan took action against two teachers who planned to undertake doctoral course work through Cambridge State University in order to increase their salaries. The district superintendent had initially approved their plans, but became suspicious when Cambridge State accepted another teacher into the doctoral program within 48 hours after the teacher had applied for admission. After investigation, school district officials discovered that Cambridge State was a diploma mill with an extensive criminal history. The teachers apparently thought the program was legitimate, but the state's arbitrator in the case said they should have realized the situation was "too good to be true" when their doctoral degrees were awarded after just six and 11 months of work.
