= Università Popolare degli Studi di Milano =

Unaccredited institution of higher education

- Università Popolare degli Studi di Milano
- Type: Unaccredited
- Established: 2006 (claims 1901)
- Officer in charge: Marco Grappeggia
- President: Marco Grappeggia
- Rector: Giovanni/Gianni Neri (previously: Nicola Crozzoletti, Marco Grappeggia, Giuseppe Catapano)
- Director: Marco Grappeggia
- Administrative staff: None
- Students: Undisclosed
- Location: Milan, Italy; 45.4832041°N 9.2073259°E
- Campus: None
- Language: Italian
- Website: www.unimilano.net (one of many)

The Università Popolare degli Studi di Milano (University of the People of Milan) is an unaccredited diploma mill using the word university in its name, (Note: In Italy, the word "università" (without elaboration) is not protected and may be used of any public or private institution of further education. The term that best matches the English word 'university' is "Università degli Studi". That the UPdSdM includes the phrase degli studi in its name makes clear its pretensions to be a legitimate institution of higher education. Foreign institutions may operate in Italy without restriction on name but must not claim Italian accreditation without basis.) located in Milan, Italy.

== Ambiguity of the name ==
The "Università Popolare degli Studi di Milano" is not to be confused with the Università degli Studi di Milano, which is one of the most important accredited Italian universities, nor with the Università Popolare di Milano (without "degli Studi"), a historical folk high school established in Milan in 1901, which is no longer active. The UPdSdM claims to be connected with the Università Popolare di Milano. In both cases, the name differs by just one word. Furthermore, the UPdSdM sometimes uses the name "Università Popolare di Milano", even in legal proceedings.

The "university" also claims to own an unaccredited "Academy of fine arts of Milan" ("Accademia di belle arti di Milano"), not to be confused with the historical and accredited Accademia di Belle Arti di Brera, Milan's academy of fine arts.

The Italian word università may mean any institute providing further education or higher education; for the international sense of the word university, the term università degli studi is used.

== Degrees ==
Università Popolare degli Studi di Milano was created in 2006 by Marco Grappeggia, also known as Marco Edgardo Grappeggia. The organization has no campus or staff, and issues Bachelor's degrees, Master's degrees and even PhDs, based on life experiences. Not being accredited by the Italian Ministry of Education, it is not on the official list of accredited Italian universities.

The issued degrees are orthomolecular and naturopathic medicine, holistic science, political science, sociology, psychology, criminology and criminal investigation, cultural property, international law, sports science, communication science, journalism, economics, marketing and finance, environmental engineering and civil engineering, management engineering, fashion and luxury goods, and others upon request.

Moreover, Università Popolare degli Studi di Milano says that former president of the European Commission and former Italian Prime Minister Romano Prodi received a degree from Università Popolare degli Studi di Milano, represented by Marco Grappeggia, in Vatican City. The date of the alleged commencement is undisclosed. However, Prodi doesn't mention Università Popolare degli Studi di Milano in his official biography, and the video is blurred, which makes it difficult to tell if the person is Prodi or someone else.

Università Popolare degli Studi di Milano's "degrees" also used to be sold by SDL Centrostudi (SDL Study center), a multi-level marketing company that organized bogus class-action lawsuits — against banks that it accused of usury — for which its founders have been indicted for fraud.

== Legal status ==
According to the "disclamer" [sic] (Note: After several years, and after the publication on Wikipedia, the "disclamer" has been corrected.) in its website and the attached papers, the Università Popolare degli Studi di Milano claims to be an "international university" governed by international law but not Italian law; it could therefore issue degrees in Italy, valid in Italy, without having Italian accreditation. The "disclamer" explains that its degrees are valid because Università Popolare degli Studi di Milano is affiliated with the University of United Popular Nations (UUPN), a limited liability company created by Grappeggia and his wife in Ouagadougou, Burkina Faso in 2012 and allegedly operating in the Ivory Coast as well. UUPN used to have two websites, www.uupn-edu.net and www.uupn.org, which are both inactive and seem to be superseded by www.uupn-edubf.org (in French) and www.unidep-edu.org (in Italian). The "disclamer" also explains that the African alleged university/corporation can issue degrees in the EU pursuant to the Lisbon Recognition Convention – although neither Burkina Faso nor the Ivory Coast belongs to the group of countries that ratified the Lisbon Convention.

In 2011, an Italian former politician, Sen. Guido Viceconte, stated that the degrees issued by the Università Popolare degli Studi di Milano must be recognized in Italy (and the EU); as a consequence, Università Popolare degli Studi di Milano gained popularity after operating under the radar for several years.

Since 2012, Università Popolare degli Studi di Milano has received several cease-and-desist orders from the Italian Ministry of Education, and has been convicted by a final judgment, but most of its websites still advertise the services and the degrees, which are chiefly sold online.

In 2016, the Italian Competition Authority sentenced Università Popolare degli Studi di Milano for false advertising on the web. The Italian Ministry of Education sent cease and desist letters in 2014 and 2016; in retaliation, Università Popolare degli Studi di Milano sued the Ministry of Education and the CIMEA (Information Centre on Academic Mobility and Equivalence), claiming they were "slanderers". In January 2020, the Ministry of Education, together with the Council of agricultural technicians at the Italian Ministry of Justice, issued an official statement saying the Università Popolare degli Studi di Milano's degrees are invalid in Italy (nota MIUR 13 January 2020, prot. n. 646) and the organization is not allowed to offer degrees.

In 2019, Università Popolare degli Studi di Milano took a legal action against the Ministry for University Instruction and Research and against the accredited Niccolò Cusano University, requesting that its award of Masters Degrees should be accepted on the grounds that the Ministry had ignored a certified email and therefore tacit consent should be assumed. In its ruling, the court affirmed that Università Popolare degli Studi di Milano is not a university in Italian law, and that its degrees are not legally valid there. It dismissed the appeal, requiring the appellant to defray the Ministry's costs in defending the action.

== Addresses and websites ==
Università Popolare degli Studi di Milano has repeatedly changed its address and/or website. It has declared itself as having branches in Milan, Ostia (Rome), Turin, Cuneo and Loreto, but the addresses are unknown. Università Popolare degli Studi di Milano has also stated, using the name Università Popolare di Milano as a "brand" [sic], that it has a journalism school in New York state, though it is unclear where it is precisely located.

== Yorker International University ==
The president of the institution, Marco Grappeggia, is also founder and president of the Yorker International University, which is supposed to be based in South Dakota, New York City, Florida and Argentina, but actually operates in Milan, Italy, using the same address as the Università Popolare degli Studi di Milano and even the same email address. The Oregon Office of Degree Authorization and the New York State Education Department made it known that Yorker International University was never accredited. However, Yorker International University used to issue degrees in Italy through Paulo Freire University, a private university located in Nicaragua that was going to be accredited in 2002. Since the Nicaraguan university had (and still has) no authorization to issue degrees in Italy, those degrees are invalid.

== Rectors of the Università Popolare degli Studi di Milano ==
=== Giuseppe Catapano ===
According to the Italian Chamber of Deputies, the first rector Giuseppe Catapano has been arrested for fraud and conspiracy.

=== Marco Grappeggia ===
The founder, current president/director, and former rector Marco Grappeggia (also known as Marco Edgardo Grappeggia) claims to hold a PhD from Columbia Business School in New York City although Columbia University stated he never graduated or received a certificate; he uses the Italian title of "prof." even though he is not a University professor according to the Italian Ministry of Education, (Note: The Italian word professore means teacher, not professor in the sense used in Anglophone countries.) and claims to be a member of the American Psychological Association, the American Marketing Association, and the Government Accreditation Association of Delaware, an accreditation mill. He also claims to have received awards and/or commendations from Jimmy Carter, George W. Bush, Daniel Ortega and US military veterans.

=== Gianni Neri ===
As of May 2022, the current rector is Giovanni or Gianni Neri. In his personal website, he declares himself to be a university professor "as stated in the CINECA MIUR search engine", that is to say the database of the Italian Ministry of Education. Although it is true that the Ministry's database contains a "Giovanni Neri", the entry refers to another Giovanni Neri who actually teaches chemistry at the University of Messina. "Il Magnifico Rettore Prof. Giovanni Neri" [sic] (The magnificent rector) declares his area of expertise as criminology, criminal justice, criminal law, comparative law, international law and business law, and that he is "authorized to practice as a lawyer before the Italian supreme courts" (plural). He also declares himself to be a member of an (otherwise unknown) "American Association of Professional Criminologists" in Washington, DC. In Italy, Giovanni Neri is mostly known as the former host of an amateur TV show about hard rock and heavy metal music in the Rome area, together with guitarist Richard Benson.

== See also ==
- Educational accreditation
- List of unaccredited institutions of higher learning
- List of universities in Italy
