= American World University =

American distance learning institution

- Established: 1990
- President: Maxine Asher
- Location: Pascagoula, Mississippi (no physical campus)
- Website: awuedu.org (archive)

American World University (AWU) is an institution offering post-secondary education programs by distance learning. It has no physical campus. It awards academic degrees. In January 2000 American World University offered "all degrees" for $1,000 as a "New Years Special".

== History ==
In 1990, Maxine Asher founded AWU, which operated out of a Rapid City, South Dakota, office until 2000, when an increase in Iowa standards for post-secondary institutions led it to relocate to Pascagoula, Mississippi. Asher herself was based in California and died in 2015.

As of 2017, its current office address is 400 South Beverly Drive, Suite 214 in Beverly Hills, California.

== Criticism and controversy ==
American World University is not accredited by any institutional accrediting body recognized by the United States Department of Education. However, it is listed as "accredited" by the World Association of Universities and Colleges, an organization that is also run by Maxine Asher.

As part of its services, AWU claims to offer people the opportunity to earn college credits based life experience and work, and to take courses at home through distance education. However, some dispute AWU's claim to provide legitimate academic services. John Bear, the author of Bears' Guide to Earning Degrees through Distance Learning, said of AWU, "Academically, there's nothing there."

In January, 2004, the State of Hawaii's Office of Consumer Protection won a lawsuit against AWU; the judgment enjoined AWU from "Providing any post-secondary instructional programs or courses leading to a degree" or "Acting as or holding themselves out as a 'college', 'academy', 'institute', 'institution', 'university' or anything similar thereto."

The Daily Iowan describes AWU in depth in an article entitled "Stealth U. in Iowa City duped many, experts say." According to the article, Michael Lambert, the executive director of the Washington, D.C.–based Distance Education and Training Council said Asher applied for accreditation for AWU to his organization in 1996. He said she complained about the requirements and the paperwork and challenged him to visit her in person. He recalls flying to Iowa City and meeting her in a few empty rooms that were the headquarters of AWU. After a 30-minute meeting, Asher withdrew the application for accreditation.

The same article related the experiences of a student named John Shaw, who he says he received specific assurances from Asher that the master's degree he was seeking would be acknowledged in Saudi Arabia. When he applied for a job in that country, he was told that neither the degree nor the school were considered legitimate: "In fact, they told me that I was wasting my time and money studying with that school."

In March 2004 The Washington Post reported that a public official was criticized for possessing a doctorate from American World University. The article quoted John Bear as saying "Academically, there's nothing there," said Bear who noted "I don't call it a school, I call it a business."

As of 2006, the Los Angeles-area Better Business Bureau's report on AWU gave it a D rating, apparently based on one complaint, which the BBB says AWU "refuse[d] to adjust, relying on terms of agreement." The Mississippi Better Business Bureau, however, called AWU's record "satisfactory," again mentioning just a single complaint (presumably a different one) which, they judged, AWU had "made every reasonable effort to resolve."

AWU granted Ph.D. diplomas to several people who later supported the university in its literature, including Dr. Adrian Waller (a former lecturer at Nihon University in Tokyo and Mishima, Japan,) and Dr. Bruce Rosen (former Asst. Professor, Computer Science, University of Texas–San Antonio). Hamzah Haz, Vice President of Indonesia, was reported to have obtained an internet PhD from AWU.

== See also ==
- List of unaccredited institutions of higher education
