= Buxton University =

Defunct diploma mill

Buxton University is an unaccredited vendor of distance education that operates as a business in the United Kingdom.

== Charter and accreditation status ==
The institution does not hold a royal charter, which is required for an institution in the United Kingdom to call itself a "university", per the Further and Higher Education Act 1992. However, the institution does not advertise itself as a university in the UK.

It has previously claimed accreditation by the World Online Education Accrediting Commission, as well as the Board of Online Universities Accreditation (BOUA), but neither agency was recognized as a higher education accreditor by the United States Department of Education or the Council on Higher Education Accreditation.

Buxton University is on the Texas Higher Education Coordinating Board list of "Institutions Whose Degrees are Illegal to Use in Texas."

== History ==
On its website, Buxton University states that it was established in 1978 and that "in 2010 the reliance on a single national jurisdiction for legal existence was changed in favour of a consortium arrangement of international Trusts and Agreements to accentuate the international nature of Buxton University."

In August 2004, a San Antonio, Texas, television station investigating bogus academic credentials had an employee order a degree from the InstantDegrees.com website. The station reported that the employee received a Buxton University master's degree, summa cum laude, by mail within a few days after submitting an order. In November of that year, a Knoxville, Tennessee, television station reported a similar experience in which an employee ordered a Ph.D. from InstantDegrees.com and received a back-dated Buxton University diploma by mail just five days after paying $160. Both stations reported that the university was identified as being in London, but the mail had come from Portugal.

Also in 2004, The Washington Post reported that a hypnotist, William R. Runnells Jr., had called himself "Doctor" and that his degree was from the American Institute of Hypnotherapy and Buxton University. In that article, the Post wrote, "...repeated Web searches and several calls to overseas operators did not turn up a listing for a Buxton University."

On November 29, 2006, the web version of NBC 4 in Columbus, Ohio, posted a transcript of a Target 4 Investigates program in which Kyle Anderson stated that "Five days after placing that order, I received this in the mail - global priority mail from Portugal. Inside, two signed and sealed diplomas from Buxton University in London, England. So for a few hundred bucks, I've got a Ph.D. in counseling, a master's of divinity in religion, some pretty official-looking letters from Buxton University, and their prospectus, which looks like it's printed on an ink-jet printer."

In 2013, a Tasmanian court discover that a woman who claimed she had several degrees, including a PhD, has obtained all of them "by mail order from the defunct "Buxton University", which issued fake degrees to anyone applying over the internet"

Although there were reports that Buxton University has ceased trading it has, as of 2025, a website and appears to be still offering a range of 'qualifications'. On its website it states "Buxton University is not and has no intention to be accredited by any higher education accreditation organization recognized by the United States Department of Education or the Council for Higher Education in the United States" and "Buxton University is not a British degree granting institution"

According to the Higher Education Degree Datacheck website, Buxton University is not a valid UK degree awarding body.

== See also ==
- Diploma mill
- List of unaccredited institutions of higher learning
