= Management Institute of Canada =

Coordinates: 45.4998°N 73.5763°W

The Management Institute of Canada or Institut Canadien de Management (MIC) is a Canadian professional school based in Montreal, authorized by the government of Quebec. MIC is an unaccredited non-degree business school in Quebec, offering online programs in business administration.

== Programs ==
MIC offers the following non-degree programs:

1. Corporate program
2. Executive leadership program
3. General program

== MIC, degrees and DIU ==
The Management Institute of Canada/Institut Canadien de Management is a school registered in Quebec, Canada.

MIC is not a degree granting institution and does not deliver MBA or BBA University degrees. For degree programs. Students interested in University degree programs can address to the unaccredited Delta International University of New Orleans, based in Louisiana.

MIC is not operating in the US and does not deliver University degree programs. MIC is a Canadian Institute offering professional courses. However, the use of unaccredited University degree titles outside of Canada is legally restricted or illegal in some jurisdictions in the USA. Jurisdictions that have restricted or made illegal the use of credentials from unaccredited schools include Oregon, Michigan, Maine, North Dakota, New Jersey, Washington, Nevada, Illinois, Indiana and Texas. Many other states are also considering restrictions on unaccredited degrees in order to help prevent fraud.
