= Internet Professional Association =

The Internet Professional Association (iProA; Chinese: 互聯網專業協會) is a Hong Kong pro-Beijing trade association representing Internet-related professional services, founded in 1999. In 2011, it was accused of political interference in the awarding of a government contract for an e-learning scheme.
