= Louisiana Baptist University =

Christian university located in Shreveport, Louisiana

Coordinates: 32.4494°N 93.8703°W

- Type: Private
- Established: 1973
- Affiliations: Baptist Bible Fellowship International
- President: Greg Lyons
- Faculty: 39
- Students: 650 (in 2010)
- Location: Shreveport, Louisiana, United States
- Website: http://www.lbu.edu/

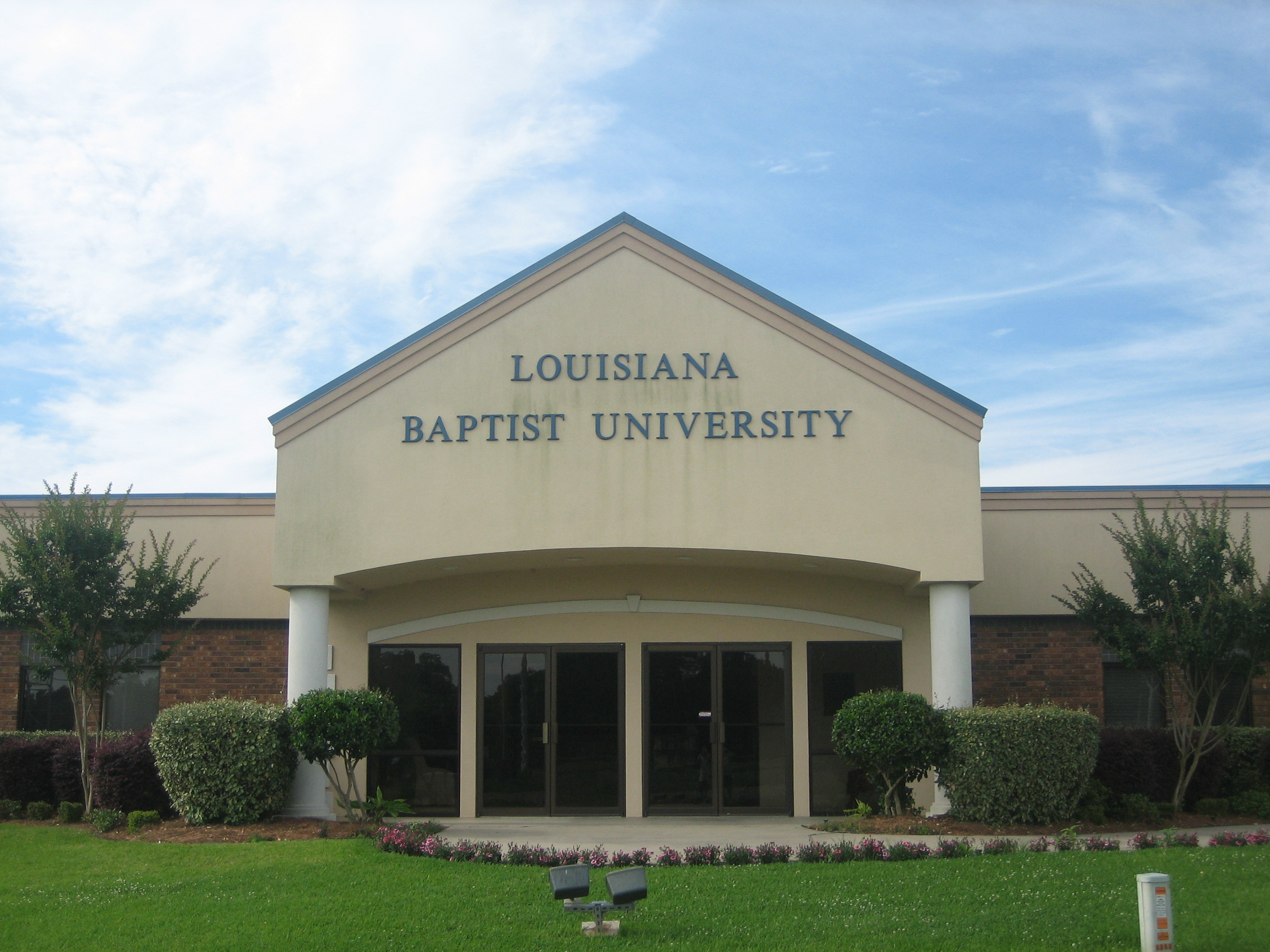
Louisiana Baptist University is located off Interstate 20 in Shreveport.

Louisiana Baptist University (LBU) is an independent Baptist Christian university located in Shreveport, Louisiana.

LBU has both an on-campus program and a distance education program which teaches subjects pertaining to the Bible and Baptist theology. The school houses five departments: School of Biblical Studies, School of Communications (Leadership), School of Christian Counseling, School of Christian Education, and Theological Seminary.

== History ==
In 1973, Baptist Christian University was founded by Jimmy G. Tharpe (1930–2008) as part of the Baptist Tabernacle, offering distance education for full-time ministers to complete degrees without leaving their pastorates. In February 1993, the trustees restructured the school's charter and changed the name to Louisiana Baptist University.

Kathleen Blanco, then governor of Louisiana, declared the month of April 2005 as "Louisiana Baptist University Month".

In its beginning, LBU was housed in the Centrum Building on Hollywood Avenue. It later relocated to a 12,500-square-foot (1,160 m^{2}) facility off Interstate 20 at 6301 Westport Avenue in the center of West Shreveport, where the campus remains today.

In May 2013, the university expanded their campus with the completion of the Neal Weaver Conference Center. The center is equipped with the latest audio/video equipment which enables the university to host webinars in addition to their conferences.

== Accreditation ==
LBU is accredited by the Accreditation Service for International Colleges (ASIC).

== Academics and staff ==
The school employs around forty faculty and staff. The current President of LBU is Greg Lyons.

== Alumni ==
Seminary

- Carl Baugh – author and founder of Pacific International University.
- Mal Couch – author and founder of Tyndale Theological Seminary.
- Rick Scarborough – author, activist, and founder of Vision America.

University

- Larry Bagley – member of the Louisiana House of Representatives for District 7
- Bob Cornuke – author and director of the Bible Archaeology Search and Exploration Institute (BASE).
- Bill Gothard – former president of the Institute in Basic Life Principles
- Grant Jeffrey – author and teacher
- Roland S. Martin – American journalist, syndicated columnist, and author.
- Chuck Missler - author and founder/operator of Koinonia Institute
- Robert Morey – author and founder of the unaccredited California Biblical University and Seminary.
- Mark Tronson – businessman
- Adrienne Southworth - member of the Kentucky Senate for District 7

== See also ==
- Higher education accreditation in the United States
