= Medical University of the Americas – Belize =

Medical University of the Americas - Belize
- Type: Private
- Active: 2001–2007
- Location: San Pedro Town, Belize

Medical University of the Americas – Belize (MUA-B) was a medical school located in San Pedro Town, Belize from 2001 to 2007. As of January 25, 2010, MUA-B is no longer a recognized institution in Belize.
