= James Kirk diploma mills =

Education fraud case

Thomas James Kirk II (also known as Thomas McPherson) operated several fraudulent higher education organizations (diploma mills), including LaSalle University in Mandeville, Louisiana (not associated with the Lasallian educational institutions nor with La Salle Extension University), the University of San Gabriel Valley, and Bienville University. Kirk's "LaSalle University" was shut down in 1996 following a raid by the FBI. Kirk was indicted for tax fraud in 1996 and, after a plea agreement, was sentenced to five years in U.S. federal prison. Kirk later died in January 2008.

== History ==
The University of San Gabriel Valley was a correspondence law school based in California. At the time, California's regulations allowed for authorization of a degree program if the prospective operator provided a list of faculty and courses and demonstrated $50,000 in assets, and Southland met California's requirements. In 1984 Time reported that a former Southland registrar said that the school had granted a bachelor's degree in engineering based on the student's short résumé and had awarded a law degree to a real estate agent on the basis of an exam designed to test legal assistants. Time quoted Kirk, who claimed he no longer operated Southland, as saying he "had no interest as an educator," but the school "was a good way to make money."

Having renamed it LaSalle University, Kirk later moved it to Mandeville, Louisiana. According to John Bear, a renowned authority on diploma mills who consulted for the FBI, Kirk set up "World Christian Church" in Louisiana, placed the university in the ownership of the "church" to claim religious exemption from state education laws, and claimed to have taken a vow of poverty.

In the mid-1990s, LaSalle provoked the attention of authorities because of evidence that government workers had been awarded promotions and salary increases based on fraudulent advanced degrees. According to a prosecutor with the Attorney General's office, more than a dozen known diploma mills had been set up in Louisiana, where the laws were particularly lenient. Federal investigators estimated that LaSalle, alone, had issued in excess of 40,000 fake diplomas, the bulk of them to government employees. In fact, LaSalle's sales and marketing materials highlighted the fact that many of its graduates occupied high positions in government.

The school was shut down after a July 1996 raid by the FBI, U.S. postal inspectors, and the Internal Revenue Service. According to John Bear, the U.S. Attorney wrote to every person in the LaSalle files, officially informing them that LaSalle was nothing more than a diploma mill. All were advised that funds were available for refunds, providing they turned in their diploma(s). Many didn't, presumably so they could continue to parlay their degrees for more money in the marketplace, with impunity (they could always claim ignorance, later). The FBI report stated that LaSalle had only one faculty member serving 15,000 students (and her only degree was a Bachelor's from LaSalle). Furthermore, the back of the student application forms contained a disclaimer advising students that their signatures simply made them Ministers of Kirk's World Christian Church, and that any degrees they might get would merely be religious degrees, regardless of the subject.

Kirk was charged with 18 criminal counts, including mail fraud, tax violations, and other crimes. At the time of his arrest, the operation was discovered to have more than $35 million in bank deposits, current cash deposits of $10 million, and other assets. Ultimately Kirk entered a plea agreement in which he was sentenced to five years in federal prison and was ordered not to operate any more schools. Kirk did, in fact, serve five years for all charges relating to these diploma mills. After he went to prison his wife, Natalie Handy, opened Edison University, an unaccredited distance education institution operated from a rented mail box at a Mail Boxes Etc. in Honolulu. Edison later used the name Acton University.

In 1997, World Christian Church sued Kirk and Handy for one million dollars.

Handy later operated Novus University School of Law (registered in Marshall Islands) from Palmdale, California. The school is not accredited by the American Bar Association and its degrees are invalid in California and Oregon.

== LaSalle University after Kirk's imprisonment ==
According to John Bear, in 1997 LaSalle University was sold to new owners who operated it as a legitimate operation until January 1999 (however, during this period some students were still doing work for the old LaSalle programs). It continued to operate under the LaSalle name from January 1999 until October 2000, during which time all academic work was intended to meet accepted academic standards.

Beginning in October 2000 and continuing until its final closure in the summer of 2002 it used the name Orion College. Pat Brister, a leader of the national and Louisiana Republican Party, was chief executive officer and chairman of the trustees of Orion College.

== Notable incidents involving LaSalle University credentials ==
In 2000, in Texas, it was reported that a nutritionist advising U.S. Olympic swimmers Dara Torres and Jenny Thompson on the use of dietary supplements had received a doctoral degree in nutrition counseling from LaSalle University.

In 2001, the Coquille Valley Sentinel profiled a hospital administrator who had asserted both a master's degree and a Ph.D. in Business Administration, from LaSalle University in Philadelphia. The real La Salle does not have a Ph.D. program in Business (only in Clinical Psychology and Nursing). Richard Cormier had been newly selected for the head administrator role with Coquille Valley Hospital, when it was discovered that he had been lying about his education. When questioned, Cormier presented copies of his diplomas, both of which were awarded in October 1994 by Kirk's outfit in Louisiana. Shortly thereafter, Cormier recanted his acceptance of the position.

In 2002, Stephen J. Furtado, a Massachusetts school superintendent, was criticized over a "phony doctorate" from LaSalle University in Louisiana, but was able to retain his job, which did not require a doctorate. However, he lists himself as having a Ph.D. degree.

In 2002, Eugene Kole resigned as president of Quincy University after it was discovered his Master of Arts degree in psychology and counseling was from LaSalle University in Louisiana and not from the accredited La Salle University in Pennsylvania.

According to a 2004 Government Accountability Office report on diploma mills, which discussed the widespread purchase of fake degrees by high-ranking government officials, one manager in the National Nuclear Safety Administration paid $5,000 for a master's degree from LaSalle in 1996. He was a lieutenant colonel in the Air Force at the time, when he felt pressured to purchase the degree in order to be promotable to colonel. He did not attend classes or take any tests, and he called his degree a "joke."

In 2006 a Texas police officer was charged with several violations related to use of false credentials, including claiming a college degree in criminal justice management based on credentials from the unaccredited LaSalle University in Mandeville, Louisiana. That same year, a Texas school superintendent was reported to have received a Ph.D. from LaSalle University in Louisiana. The superintendent told reporters he "had no idea" that the university was fraudulent. A Texas Higher Education Coordinating Board official described LaSalle as a "fraudulent or sub-standard institution" and noted that Texas law made it a misdemeanor to use "a fraudulent or sub-standard degree to promote a business to seek employment or ask extra compensation."

In 2006 TV hypnotist Paul McKenna won a libel action in the United Kingdom and was awarded "relatively modest" damages against the Daily Mirror over a statement by the newspaper that Paul McKenna was dishonest when using his LaSalle degree. The court stated, "Mr McKenna was not, in my judgment, dishonest and, for that matter, whatever one may think of the academic quality of his work, or of the La Salle degree, it would not be accurate to describe it as 'bogus'." "Desmond Browne, QC, for McKenna, said that 'any perceived lack of academic rigour at La Salle' did not prove that his client was dishonest."

In 2007, the Joplin Globe (Missouri) reported on the controversy of Cherokee County Sheriff Steve Norman's bachelor's degree being from a "diploma mill" LaSalle University.

In 2007, the Post Star (Glens Falls, NY) reported on the controversy of candidate Nathan York running for Warren County Sheriff when he included a bachelor's degree from LaSalle University on his campaign literature.

In 2008, the Ethics Review Committee of the Georgia Professional Standards Commission (PSC) suspended the Georgia Educator certificate of one of its teachers. According to the published minutes, a high school science teacher in the Savannah-Chatham County School System had cited a Ph.D. from LaSalle University on his 2005 application for certification. Because the dates of enrollment conflicted with those shown on his employment application, the degree was called into question. The teacher could not explain the credits on his transcript, and he acknowledged that he never actually completed a written dissertation. Ultimately, he admitted that the degree from LaSalle was illegitimate, although he had been receiving a higher salary because of it. Consequently, the Commission sanctioned the teacher for misrepresenting his qualifications, stating that "the school system cannot have confidence in a teacher who would cheat the system by buying their doctorate degree online."

In 2008, the Chicago Tribune reported that Vice Admiral Donald Arthur, who had retired as Navy surgeon general, had a Juris Doctor degree from LaSalle. His PhD and JD have since been removed from his official biography but remain in his service record. Arthur said, "I could say I was naive, but I was 40 years old. And I didn't understand completely what was going on."

In 2008, in Ohio, a complaint was filed with the Columbiana county Board of Elections challenging the qualifications of Austin French, a candidate for county sheriff. French said that he was unaware that the FBI had shut down LaSalle University or that its founder had been sent to prison."

In early 2009, it was reported that Jeffrey Camarda, a Florida financial planner who had been promoting himself as holding a finance Ph.D. from a "LaSalle University", had obtained his degree from Kirk's operation in Louisiana. Camarda received an inquiry into his background by the CFA Institute, after which he voluntarily stopped using the PhD as a credential. Camarda became involved in civil litigation with a former colleague, who asserted that Camarda had committed fraud when he represented his diploma mill credential as a valid Ph.D.

A 2009 Independent Weekly story reported on the controversy surrounding the newly elected vice chairman of the North Carolina Republican Party, Tim Johnson. Johnson claimed to have a Ph.D. in Total Quality Management; however, he would not discuss his alma mater, which he had previously cited as LaSalle University, 2000. In an email signed "Timothy F. Johnson, Ph.D.", Johnson replied to a direct inquiry merely by saying that he would not answer questions about his background. Johnson still claims the designation on his own website, but his educational background is not divulged.

In 2010, a Republican candidate for the Michigan House of Representatives, Mark Ouimet, was criticized for claiming a master's degree in business administration from "LaSalle University", implying that his degree was from the accredited La Salle University in Philadelphia when it was obtained from the unaccredited school in Louisiana. Ouimet's degree was awarded in 1999, after Kirk's operation had been shut down. Ouimet won the election.

In February 2015, Mohau N. Pheko, South Africa's ambassador to Japan and former ambassador to Canada, said she regretted having fraudulently claimed on her résumé to have earned a PhD from LaSalle University in 2000, claiming instead to have done the work but been thwarted by the university's sudden closure.

In March 2020, the State of Florida's ethics commission recommended that Mel Jurado, the mayor of Temple Terrace, be sanctioned after finding she claimed a PhD from the University of Illinois, when she had actually received it from LaSalle University in Mandeville, Louisiana.

== See also ==
- List of unaccredited institutions of higher learning
- List of unrecognized accreditation associations of higher learning
- TJ Kirk, son of Thomas James Kirk II
