= St. Theresa's Medical University (St. Kitts) =

Medical school in Basseterre, Saint Kitts

Coordinates: 17.2954°N 62.7514°W

- Motto: Studium discendi voluntate quae cogi non potest constat
- Motto in English: Study depends on the good will of the student, a quality which cannot be secured by compulsion
- Type: Private
- Active: 2005–2009
- Affiliations: Warnborough College; Institute of Technological Studies
- Chancellor: Thomas M. Uhrin
- President: Jeffrey T. Irwin
- Dean: Thomas M. Uhrin
- Location: Basseterre, St. Kitts
- Website: www.stmu.org

St. Theresa's Medical University was a medical school located in Basseterre, Saint Kitts prior to its closure in 2009.

== History ==
St. Theresa's Medical University was opened in August 2005 and closed in August 2009.

The medical school was founded by its chancellor and executive dean, Thomas M. Uhrin, of Latrobe, Pennsylvania, where it also had offices. In St. Kitts Uhrin represented himself as holding an M.D. degree, but he had been terminated in 2004 by the International University of the Health Sciences in St. Kitts for misrepresenting his academic credentials. In 1999 he had resigned as Medical Director of a clinic in Greensburg, Pennsylvania, after admitting that he had not completed medical training and was not licensed as a medical doctor. Uhrin's credentials became the subject of investigations by government ministries.

Of the initial class of 17 students, 15 withdrew amid allegations of verbal abuse, unsafe learning conditions, and improper treatment of cadavers. As of the fall term ending December 2006, STMU had approximately one dozen students. In early 2007, the school claimed to have approximately 30 students enrolled. At the time of its closure, it had eight or ten students.

== Academic partnerships ==
STMU was in an academic partnership with Warnborough College for automatic admission of holders of Warnborough College (UK) Pre-Medical diplomas and issuance of dual degrees with Warnborough College (IE). The Oregon Office of Degree Authorization states that Warnborough and STMU were operated jointly.

In May 2009, the Institute of Technological Studies announced that it had formed a partnership to open a branch campus of STMU in Colombo, Sri Lanka, beginning in June 2009, with approximately 75 students, for which STMU claimed to have government approval. The closure of STMU ended these plans and other plans for expansion into Italy. "Health Education Associates Unlimited, Inc.", the investment firm promoted by Uhrin and STMU President and CEO Jeffrey T. Irwin to finance the Sri Lanka and Italy expansions, folded in 2009, leaving investors unpaid. A former US Attorney who examined the firm's agreements characterized it as fitting the characteristics of a Ponzi scheme; in December 2009, Uhrin denied that it was a plan to defraud investors. Both Uhrin and Irwin later pleaded guilty in Federal Court to willful failure to file US tax returns, not reporting income from the operations of STMU and Health Education Associates.

== Accreditation issues ==
The school was accredited in 2005 by the Federation of St. Kitts and Nevis to grant Bachelor of Science, Master of Medicine, Doctor of Medicine, Doctor of Pharmacology and Doctor of Philosophy degrees. In 2006, the Ministry of Education's Accreditation Board commenced an investigation of STMU in light of unspecified complaints about STMU. The Ministry of Health commenced a separate investigation about the extent of Mr. Uhrin's medical training, the validity of his professional credentials and possible fraud in the accreditation application process. Yet another investigation by the Ministry of Health concerned the importation and handling of cadavers by the school. The ministries did not disclose the results of their investigations, but stated that the school had lost its accreditation prior to it closing.

=== Status in US and UK ===
The US Department of Education's National Committee on Foreign Medical Education and Accreditation (NCFMEA) does not recognize the accreditation standards used by the government of St. Kitts and Nevis as being comparable to those used to accredit medical schools in the United States. Accordingly, STMU students were ineligible to participate in the Federal Family Educational Loan (FFEL) program.

STMU graduates are eligible to apply for certification by the Educational Commission for Foreign Medical Graduates (ECFMG)for entry into residency or fellowship programs in the US. This does not assure that certification will be granted, or that once granted, a STMU graduate will be eligible for a residency or fellowship program or for medical licensing in a particular state.

- Arkansas The Arkansas State Medical Board banned STMU graduates from medical licensing in that state, and STMU graduates are ineligible for residency or fellowships at the University of Arkansas College of Medicine.
- California STMU graduates are not eligible for licensure in the State of California, because it is not listed as a recognized medical school by the Medical Board of California.
- Florida A former STMU student was advised in November 2009 by the National Association of Boards of Pharmacy that he was ineligible to be certified as a foreign pharmacy school graduate and could not sit for the Florida licensing examination due to STMU's lack of accreditation and other issues.
- Maine The State of Maine lists STMU as non-accredited, which precludes use of a STMU degree to obtain employment, promotion or higher compensation, admission to an institution of higher education, or in connection with any business, trade, profession or occupation.
- Michigan The State of Michigan lists STMU as unaccredited, precluding use of a STMU degree to satisfy educational requirements of the Michigan Civil Service Commission.
- Oregon The State of Oregon Office of Degree Authorization lists STMU as unaccredited.

STMU graduates are considered on a case-by-case basis for eligibility to register with the General Medical Council to practice medicine in the UK.
