= Kolë =

- Gender: Male
- Language: Albanian

Origin
- Region of origin: Albania, Kosovo

Kolë is an Albanian masculine given name. People bearing the name Kolë include:

- Kolë Berisha (1947–2021), Kosovan politician
- Kolë Idromeno (1860–1939), Albanian painter
- Kolë Laca (1972–), co-founder and member of the musical group Shkodra Elektronike
- Kolë Tromara (1882–1945), Albanian nationalist and political figure
- Kolë Xhumari (1912–2006), Albanian academic

== See also ==
- Kole (name)
