= Fairfax University =

Unaccredited school in Louisiana (1986–2004)

Fairfax University was an unaccredited distance-learning institution established in Louisiana in 1986 and discontinued in 2004. Prior to losing its state of Louisiana license in 2001, it held graduation ceremonies in the US. Its president was the British academic Alan M. Jones, PhD. In 2005 the University was relaunched as Fairfax University Institute with Alan Jones still as its President. In June 2007 several news media sources reported that it had relocated to the Cayman Islands where it was operating under its new name.

U.S. state education agencies report that Fairfax operated in the past from the U.S. states of Louisiana (the university had an administration office in Baton Rouge until 2004), Montana, and South Dakota and from the United Kingdom.

According to HEDD, the UK Higher Education’s official system for candidate verification and university authentication, which deals with degree fraud and in line with other national accreditation agencies in other countries, degrees from Fairfax University are not recognised as having any academic validity in the United Kingdom.

== Alumni ==
- Samuel Kobia, General Secretary of the World Council of Churches. The World Council of Churches removed the degree of PhD from his curriculum vitae (CV) after a controversy about Fairfax.
- Sven Otto Littorin, former Swedish Minister for Employment. Littorin removed the degree of MBA from his CV after a controversy about Fairfax.

== See also ==
- Diploma mill
- Name It and Frame It?
