= Adam Smith University =

Private distance learning university

- Type: Private, distance learning
- Established: 1991
- President: Donald Grunewald
- Location: Garapan, Saipan, CNMI (U.S. commonwealth); 15.2066°N 145.7206°E
- Website: http://www.adamsmith.edu

Adam Smith University is a private distance learning university founded in 1991 by Donald Grunewald, who is still its president. Grunewald was president of Mercy College between 1972 and 1984.

== History ==
Adam Smith's current American mailing address is a private mailbox in Garapan on Saipan in the Northern Mariana Islands, a U.S. commonwealth. Adam Smith University asserts the establishment of a French unit called École Supérieure Universitaire Adam Smith, which offers academic degrees for work experience.

== Accreditation ==
Adam Smith University was accredited by the Liberian Ministry of Education since 1995, well before the most recent conflicts, and was accredited as a result of an act of the Liberian legislature. The Texas Higher Education Coordinating Board identifies the institution as operating from Liberia and Saipan, but states that it has "no degree-granting authority from Liberia or Saipan."

== Criticism ==
Steve Levicoff referred to Adam Smith University as a degree mill, and he noted that it operated in Louisiana due to the absence of laws regulating the granting of degrees. Adam Smith University and Columbia State University have the same address, which is "likely a mail forwarding address".

Other critics have described Adam Smith University as a "diploma mill". Alan Contreras from the Oregon State Office of Degree Authorization (ODA), an agency of that state's government, called Adam Smith "a diploma mill with a long and unattractive history" in an article written in a personal capacity.
