= Madison University =

Distance learning college in Gulfport, Mississippi, U.S.

- Type: Unaccredited
- Location: Gulfport, Mississippi, United States
- Website: www.madisonu.org

Madison University is a non-accredited distance learning college located in Gulfport, Mississippi. The state of Mississippi considers Madison an "unapproved" college. Madison is also listed as an unaccredited and/or substandard institution by four other U.S. states. According to The Chronicle of Higher Education, Madison University has been referred to as a diploma mill by the state of Oregon.

Tuition is charged per degree, not per course, credit, or academic term. The school offers discounts for multiple degrees or for referring other enrollees. A 2004 newspaper article stated, "During legislative debate in Mississippi last year, Madison University, a school of particular concern to state officials and one identified as a diploma mill by the state of Oregon, said it enrolled 39,000 students from around the world."

== Recognition ==
Madison University states that it is fully accredited by the World Association of Universities and Colleges. This organization is, however, an unrecognized "accreditation" board that is not recognized or approved by either the United States Department of Education or Council for Higher Education Accreditation. Since the school is not accredited by an accreditation body recognized by its country, its degrees and credits might not be acceptable to employers or other institutions, and use of degree titles may be restricted or illegal in some jurisdictions.

In 2006 the Virgin Islands Daily News reported that Virgin Islands Senator Adlah Donastorg, a candidate for territorial governor, listed on his resume a bachelor's degree in business administration from Madison University. An Investigation by the newspaper revealed that Madison was not accredited by any recognized agency and was listed on the "Non-Approved Entities" list of the Mississippi Commission on College Accreditation. Madison provided names of several "accreditors" that the newspaper found are either not engaged in accreditation or are not recognized accreditors in the United States, including the World Association of Universities and Colleges, National Academy of Higher Education, and the Association of Distance Learning Programs. After publication of this information, Donastorg's attorney notified the newspaper that he would sue over the article. Donastorg told the newspaper that his online classes through Madison University "were among some of the most challenging of his academic career" and he was not aware that Madison's accreditation was unrecognized.

In 2009, Mississippi based newspaper The Clarion-Ledger reported the school "sought information from the commission on gaining approval several months ago but did not complete the process, even though it has continued operating in this state." The article also reported "the cost for a bachelor's degree is a flat $4,870, which can be paid in monthly installments".

The Sacramento Bee reported that firefighters that had purchased degrees from diploma mills to get raises were having their raises revoked. Madison University was listed as one of the institutions that had provided degrees.

== See also ==
- Educational accreditation
- Degree mill
- List of unaccredited institutions of higher learning
