= Bienville University =

Unaccredited university in Baton Rouge, Louisiana

- Founder: Thomas James Kirk II
- Location: Baton Rouge, Louisiana, United States

Bienville University was an unaccredited institution that was based in Baton Rouge, Louisiana. It was run by Thomas J. Kirk. Bienville University was referred to as a diploma mill or degree mill in a 2003 article by KVBC News 3. It was never recognised or approved by any accreditation agency and was not approved by the US Department of Education nor the Council for Higher Education Accreditation and has been closed by the State of Louisiana.

It then moved to Woodville, Mississippi. The Texas Higher Education Coordinating Board has put Bienville University on the list of Institutions Whose Degrees are Illegal to Use in Texas. Without recognized accreditation, Bienville's degrees and credits might not be acceptable to employers or other academic institutions, and use of degree titles may be restricted or illegal in some jurisdictions.

Jurisdictions that have restricted or made illegal the use of credentials from unaccredited schools include Oregon, Michigan, Maine, North Dakota, New Jersey, Washington, Nevada, Illinois, Indiana, and Texas. Many other states are also considering restrictions on the use of degrees from unaccredited institutions.

A Las Vegas police chief was told in 2002 that his diploma from Bienville would not earn him more pay because the institution does not meet the standards of accreditation required.
