= Warnborough College =

Colleges in England and Ireland

Warnborough College (UK) Warnborough College (IE)
- Type: Private, for-profit
- Established: 1973, 1997, 2006
- Chairman: John Allen
- President: Brenden D. Tempest-Mogg
- Vice-president: Julian Ng
- Location: Canterbury, Kent, UK; Dublin, Ireland

Warnborough College (also known as Warnborough University) is an unaccredited institution of higher education with offices in the United Kingdom and Ireland.

Warnborough College was founded in Oxford, England, in 1973. Despite being unaffiliated with the University of Oxford, the College was accused by a number of its students to have misrepresented itself as an accredited institution with an association with Oxford University. In the 1990s, a number of legal actions were taken out against the College, resulting in a $300,000 judgment for restitution, a $40,000 fine by the United States Department of Education, and the revocation of Warnborough's ability to take part in United States federal financial assistance programmes.

In 1996, Warnborough had gone into liquidation, and the founders moved to Australia, later opening Warnborough University and successive Warnborough College branches, all of which are unaccredited.

== History ==
=== 1973–1996: Oxford ===
Warnborough College was founded in Oxford, England, in 1973, offering study abroad programmes and catering largely to American students spending a semester or year abroad as part of their academic programme. The college, which is not affiliated with the University of Oxford, was founded by Brenden Tempest-Mogg, an Australian who had attended Hertford College of Oxford University in 1970. Mogg's other offerings also included summer school programmes and a venue for summer conferences. It was founded on Warnborough Road in North Oxford; in 1976, it moved to Boars Hill, about four miles south from the city of Oxford.

In 1985, Warnborough College began the Warnborough Australian Studies Programmes for studies in Sydney and Brisbane, Australia. The nine American students who enrolled for the initial semester characterized the program as an "egregious academic dodge" in which they were misled as to their access to facilities at the University of Sydney and University of Queensland, and in which their lecturers were misled that the students were from Oxford University instead of American colleges.

In the 1980s, Warnborough College began offering postgraduate programs. In 1987, BBC Radio broadcast a 25-minute long expose, revealing that Warnborough had no authority to issue degrees, and characterized Warnborough as a "nightmare" of low academic standards, inadequate teaching, high cost, and poor facilities and living conditions. In the aftermath of the BBC report, enrollment declined drastically, creating a financial crisis because Warnborough had taken out a $2 million high-interest loan, which could only be paid off by recruiting more students. In 1995, Warnborough decided to recruit graduating high-school students, holding itself out as a four-year college.

When the first class of American, Russian and Japanese 4-year students arrived in 1995, several American students alleged that Warnborough misled them into believing it was affiliated with Oxford University. When students discovered that Warnborough had no connection with Oxford University roughly half the new enrolment immediately withdrew from the college, with some intending to sue for refunds. The college denied that it had claimed any association with Oxford University. Those students who remained discovered that, because Warnborough was not accredited, the credits for their classes were not transferable. The Financial Times stated that all the students were "victims of an elaborate scam".

Oxford University threatened Warnborough College with a lawsuit over these alleged misrepresentations, and the Washington State Higher Education Coordinating Board sued Warnborough. The lawsuit resulted in a judgement against Warnborough College by the Superior Court of King County, Washington of nearly $300,000. Warnborough never paid the restitution ordered by the Court.

On 4 October 1995, the United States Department of Education took emergency action against and then, in 1996, terminated the eligibility of Warnborough College to participate in the federal student financial assistance programmes under Title IV of the Higher Education Act of 1965 on the basis that it was not a degree-granting foreign institution; its credits were not freely transferable to eligible US universities; and it had no eligible one-year vocational programmes. It also fined the college $40,000 for failing to make refunds to students in accord with Title IV and for misrepresentations to students.

By the following year, Warnborough College Oxford had closed and liquidated. Hertford College was reported to be pursuing legal action against Warnborough College to recover a property rental debt of 6,000 pounds. Other creditors hired a private detective to track down the principals after they returned to Australia. The Boars Hill properties were repossessed by creditors and its corporate owner was wound up in a petition by the Inland Revenue. In 1996, Warnborough relocated temporarily to offices rented from the New Road Baptist Church in central Oxford. The Tempest-Moggs returned to Australia in July 1996 and the New Road office closed in August 1996. In October 1996, Warnborough went into liquidation.

=== 1997–2005: London and Canterbury ===
In 1997 Warnborough University was registered as a limited company in Ireland, directed by Brenden Tempest-Mogg and Kee Guan Ng, a Malaysian national with a registered branch office in the United Kingdom. It initially operated an office in London and later moved to Canterbury in 2001. It offered graduate and undergraduate residential and non-residential degrees in liberal arts, scientific and professional studies.

In November 2005 Ireland's Department of Education and Science said that Warnborough University in Ireland was in breach of the Universities Act 1997 by calling itself a university and requested that they not use the word "university". Earlier in 2005, the inclusion of Warnborough and other unauthorized degree providers on a UK Department for Education and Skills (DFES) list of "genuine" education providers was described as an "embarrassment" to DFES.

Warnborough College UK is located in Canterbury, Kent. When it was inspected in May 2012 by the Independent Schools Inspectorate (ISI) for Private Further Education, it was reported to have 59 students, of which the vast majority were foreign students on Tier 4 visas, principally from Asia, of which only four had English as their first language.

== Accreditation ==
Warnborough represented to the US Department of Education during its termination hearings in 1996 that, at the time, its degrees were actually issued by the unaccredited Greenwich University (Norfolk Island), with which it had a contractual arrangement to do so. Warnborough was represented in the DOE hearings by John Walsh of Brannagh, Chancellor of Greenwich.

Warnborough was formerly in an academic partnership with Saint Theresa's Medical University for automatic admission to the university of holders of Warnborough College (UK) Pre-Medical diplomas and for issuance of dual degrees by STMU with Warnborough College (IE). The Oregon Office of Degree Authorization characterized STMU as being jointly operated with Warnborough.

In the early 2000s Warnborough University generated controversy in Australia because neither Warnborough nor any of its consortium partners through which it was offering graduate and undergraduate degrees were accredited to do so. The Australian state of New South Wales included Warnborough on a list of five "unrecognized universities".

Warnborough College UK is designated by the Accreditation Service for International Colleges as an "ASIC Premier College", which permits its students to obtain short-term study visas in the UK, but such accreditation is not recognized for any other purpose.

Warnborough College Ireland has an office in Dublin. It is not accredited by any known organization. Warnborough College Ireland courses are not recognised by Ireland's Department of Education, the Higher Education and Training Awards Council (HETAC) or the National Qualifications Authority of Ireland (NQAI). In February 2008, Sean O'Foghlu, chief executive of NQAI told the Irish Independent that because Warnborough College is not a recognised higher education institution or awarding body the qualifications are "effectively worthless".

In July 2008, HETAC denied the college's application for accreditation. Warnborough sought leave to take judicial review of the denial but withdrew its appeal in November 2008 after HETAC agreed to permit Warnborough to submit a new accreditation application.

The Oregon Office of Degree Authorization named Warnborough in its former list of unaccredited universities, with its then administrator, Alan Contreras, characterising Warnborough College as "a diploma mill that has managed to move back and forth between Britain and Ireland for decades without either government's being able to put an end to it."

== Buildings and sites ==
From 1976 to 1996, Warnborough College Oxford, was located at the former facilities of Plater College (which had relocated to Headington), the Bishop's palace of the Diocese of Oxford, and Yatscombe Hall, on Boar's Hill. The Boars Hill facilities were used for teaching, administration and accommodations, and were characterized by the Financial Times as "a grotty campus on the outskirts of town".

After the college was liquidated and the property repossessed, the site was occupied by squatters. The site was subject to planning disputes for over a decade thereafter. Yatscombe Hall was destroyed by fire in December 2003 and all the buildings on the site were demolished. A retirement village was planned for the site, but eventually a development of a four large country homes was built instead by Millgate Homes.

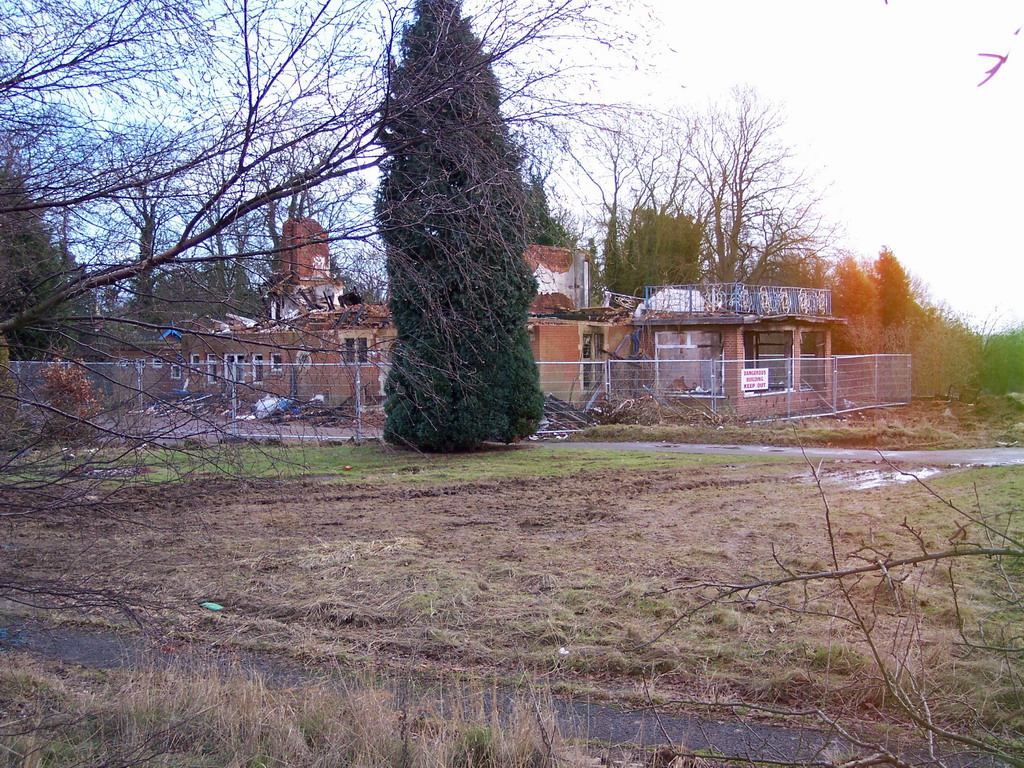
Remains of Yatscombe Hall in January 2004

From 2006 to 2008, Warnborough College Ireland rented offices from the former All Hallows College in Drumcondra but All Hallows said it would not renew Warnborough's lease after August 2008. In February 2008, the Irish Independent reported that All Hallows officials were concerned about the college's presence on All Hallows' grounds. At All Hallows' request, Warnborough removed photographs of All Hallows from its website.

== See also ==
- British Council
- Educational accreditation
- Independent Schools Inspectorate
- UK Visas and Immigration
- Accreditation Service for International Colleges
