= Eugene Kole =

Fr. Eugene Kole, OFM Conv, served as Quincy University's 20th president from 1997–2002. During his tenure the school embarked on an $8.6 million fitness center renovation, remodeling of St. Francis Hall and the addition of new academic programs.

== Resignation ==
Kole resigned from Quincy University on October 22, 2002, after the school's board of trustees discovered several inconsistencies in Kole's resume. Specifically, Kole lied about receiving a master of science degree in counseling from Canisius College and a master of arts degree in psychology and counseling from La Salle University. He did have a degree from the similarly named unaccredited LaSalle University which was later closed down due to its being a diploma mill. According to Canisius College, Kole took classes in the summers of 1972 and 1973 under the name Eugene Kolodiezj.

Kole was succeeded by Fr. Mario DiCicco, O.F.M., who served as intern president for one year.

Kole later served as a chaplain at Pope Air Force Base and Langley Air Force Base.

== Death ==
Kole died suddenly on March 3, 2016. He was posthumously awarded a medal for meritorious civilian service by the Air Force.
