= American Accrediting Association of Theological Institutions =

- Formation: 1983
- Type: Unrecognized higher education accreditor
- Location: Rocky Mount, North Carolina

American Accrediting Association of Theological Institutions (AAATI) is a Christian nonprofit organization based in Rocky Mount, North Carolina. It was founded by Cecil Johnson, president of Christian Bible College, a distance education Bible college based in Rocky Mount North Carolina.

Many institutions hold accreditation through various accrediting associations to appeal to a broader set of students. While seeking to provide a semblance of accountability for religious training institutions, AAATI is not recognized as an accreditor by either the United States Department of Education or the Council for Higher Education Accreditation.

== History ==
AAATI was started in 1983. It is operated by Cecil Johnson, president of Christian Bible College, a distance education Bible college based in Rocky Mount that Steve Levicoff identifies as a diploma mill. In 1993, Levicoff wrote that AAATI gave accreditation for a $100 fee with no educational requirements (a $75.00 a renewal fee each year), and described it as a meaningless accreditation because it was not recognized by the Federal Government.

== Accreditation program ==
Therapon University, one of the schools with AAATI accreditation, describes accreditation by AAATI as "religious accreditation, rather than secular". Therapon states that AAATI "monitors educational and religious standards for Bible colleges", providing accreditation that is "accepted by many religious organizations" but may not be accepted by employers or other educational institutions because AAATI lacks U.S. Department of Education recognition.

== Christian Bible College ==
Like many secular schools are now offering, some of the AAATI accredited schools offer a limited amount of "life experience" credit toward degrees.

Alumni of Christian Bible College, one of the AAATI accredited schools include Chuck Baldwin, founder and former pastor of Crossroad Baptist Church in Pensacola, Florida, and the Constitution Party's nominee for president in 2008 and vice president in 2004.

== Affiliated institutions ==
Institutions that have claimed membership in, or accreditation from, the AAATI include:

- Alpha Omega Bible College & Seminary Inc., Elkton, South Dakota
- Christian Bible College, Rocky Mount, North Carolina
- International Institute of Church Management Inc., based in Plymouth, Pennsylvania, USA, and Chennai, India
- Liberty Bible College and Seminary
- National Chaplains Institute's Biblical Life College and Seminary
- Pacific International University
- Patriot Bible University, Del Norte, Colorado
- Slidell Baptist Seminary
- Shalom Bible College & Seminary, West Des Moines, Iowa
- Therapon University, St. Thomas, U.S. Virgin Islands
- White Horse School of Ministry, West Lafayette, Indiana
- Zion Ministerial Institute

== See also ==
- List of unaccredited institutions of higher learning
- List of unrecognized accreditation associations of higher learning
