= Oval Bible College =

Christian college operating out of Lake Charles, Louisiana

- Motto: It's all about the word
- Type: Private religious college
- Established: June 2000
- Location: Lake Charles, Louisiana, United States; 33.94°N 83.96°W
- Campus: none
- Website: www.ovalbiblecollege.com

Oval Bible College (OBC) is an independent religious institution founded by Dr. Timmy Tezeno in June 2000 in Lake Charles, Louisiana, United States. The College, which provides theological education, is now located in Lake Charles, Louisiana.

Oval Bible College operates in 38 states and several countries, including Greece, China, West Indies, Nigeria, South Africa, Mauritius, Singapore, Canada, Australia, Mexico, United Kingdom, Puerto Rico, Kenya, Philippines, Virgin Islands, Norway, Germany, India, Italy, Antigua and Barbuda, Haiti, and Ghana.
