= IOND University =

Japanese distance education institution

- Motto: We care about what you know, not where you learned it.
- Type: Unaccredited / Distance education / Non-profit
- Established: April 12, 1999
- Location: Hawaii (registered) / Japan (operations), United States / Japan

IOND University is an unaccredited supplier of distance education based in Japan and registered as a domestic nonprofit corporation in Hawaii. It is considered to be a diploma mill operation by experts in Japan.

The university dates its beginnings to April 12, 1999. Its name is an acronym for International Organization for Nontraditional Distance Learning.

IOND's programs include studies in Japanese traditional culture for students who are United States citizens. Other areas of study offered include liberal arts, hypnosis, international relations (including defense, religion, and political economy), art, music, management, sciences, engineering, English, Japanese sword, Budō, unknown phenomena research (including UFOlogy, ESP, and paranormal phenomena), environmental sciences, and marine sciences. Bachelor's, Master's and Ph.D. degrees are offered.

The university states that its "first motto" is "We care about what you know, not where you learned it." This motto refers to the university's practice of awarding academic credit for life experience. According to IOND's website, "We assess and evaluate the student's personal experience and convert it into university credits... The professor scientifically assesses and evaluates the student's personal experience and achievements. The professor then provides the technical and methodological learning direction so as to change the student's personal experience into knowledge. We issue degrees to students according to their level of achievement of their learning paradigm."

IOND's website states that the institution has academic partnerships with Mindanao State University and "Univaersidad De Manila" (possibly referring to Universidad de Manila) in the Philippines and with the University of Łódź in Poland, but the Oregon State Office of Degree Authorization (ODA) states that there is "no evidence of legal authority to issue degrees valid in Philippines" and that the University of Łódź denies being affiliated with IOND. The Texas Higher Education Coordinating Board states that IOND has claimed to be approved by the Philippines, but "that appears to consist of a claim of affiliation with some Philippine universities, which does not constitute approval to operate".

The State of Hawaii filed an official complaint against IOND University charging violation of state consumer protection laws. Trial was conducted in October 2008 and the judge issued an oral summary decision on October 17, 2008.
