= Pacific International University =

Distance learning university in Missouri, US

Coordinates: 37.209086°N 93.290246°W

Pacific International University

Pacific International University was an unaccredited evangelical, Christian college located in Springfield, Missouri. Carl Baugh, a 1989 alumnus, was the university's president.

== Background ==
The school was founded in 1980 as Pacific College of Graduate Studies by Clifford Wilson, PhD, and incorporated in 1987 as Pacific International University in Missouri. It was also sometimes known as Pacific College Incorporated. In 1993, while operating in Australia, the school was accredited by the Higher Education Division of Victoria, and allowed to offer both Masters and Doctoral programs. However, this accreditation was only in place for a short time.

The school offered distance learning courses in biblical theology, ministry, cults, and many related subjects. It is unknown what credentials the professors had in these fields. The school offered B.Min., B.D., B.Th., M.B.S. (Master of Biblical Studies), M.Div., M.Th., and five religious doctoral degrees (Doctor of Ministry, Doctor of Biblical Studies, Doctor of Christian Education, Doctor of Theology and Doctor of Theological Studies.)

== Criticism and controversy ==
The university had an administrative office but no campus, so did not offer physical classes on site. It offered correspondence education and franchised some of its degree programs to other colleges in Australia.

There were no minimum educational requirements to apply for certificate courses other than two references, one academic and one church related. Undergraduate degrees required high school graduation for admission, although exceptions could be made for advanced experience. The admission requirements for junior master's degrees was a bachelor's degree, and admission to senior master's degrees required a junior master's degree. Most doctoral degrees required a master's degree for admission. The tuition and fees ranged up to 2,500-3,000 USD per semester for a Doctor of Theological Studies degree.

The university had no recognized accreditation. The university noted it "is in good standing with the American Accrediting Association of Theological Institutions, Inc. (North Carolina) and is also a member of the Association of Christian Colleges and Theological Schools (Louisiana)," but for legal reasons made it known that "these memberships do NOT constitute accreditation by the U.S. Office of Education." These accreditations were not recognized by government or accredited institutions because these accreditation agencies were not recognized by the United States Department of Education or the Council for Higher Education Accreditation.

== Alumni ==
- Carl Baugh (1989) - School president
- Jack Van Impe - Televangelist
- Hal Lindsey - Televangelist
- Charles Stanley - Televangelist
- Jack Hayford - King's University Founder
- Jerry Falwell (1999) - Liberty University Founder
- Pat Robertson (2000) - Regent University Founder
- Pat Boone (2000) - Singer
- Ange Felix Patasse (2000) - President Of Central African Republic
- John Blanchard (2001) - Author
- Dae Yun Kim (2001) - Pastor
- Patrick Heron (2004) - Author

== See also ==
- List of unaccredited institutions of higher learning
- List of unrecognized accreditation associations of higher learning
- School accreditation
