= Paulo Freire University =

- Universidad Paulo Freire (UPF)
- Motto: Educación para la vida
- Motto in English: Education for life
- Type: Private
- Established: 2002
- Rector: Adrian Meza Sosa
- Location: Managua, Nicaragua
- Nickname: UPF
- Website: www.upf.edu.ni

The Universidad Paulo Freire (UPF) is a university in Managua, Nicaragua, with branches in Managua, San Marcos, Carazo, San Carlos, Río San Juan. It is named after Brazilian educator Paulo Freire.

The UPF was established in 1998 as the Paulo Freire University Institute (IPF) and has operated as an accredited university since 2002.
