= Information Centre on Academic Mobility and Equivalence =

The Information Centre on Academic Mobility and Equivalence (CIMEA) is the Italian centre in the National Academic Recognition Information Centre (NARIC) network. It was established in 1984 and since 1986 has operated through an agreement with Italy's Ministry of Education, Universities and Research.
