= Delta International University of New Orleans =

Post-secondary business school in Baton Rouge, LA

Delta International University of New Orleans or DIU is a post-secondary business school in Baton Rouge, Louisiana, offering online programs in business administration.

== Programs ==
Program offered is the MBA (Master in Business Administration).

== Licensing and accreditation status ==
On May 28, 2009, the Louisiana Board of Regents conditionally approved Delta to operate a postsecondary academic degree granting institution for a three-year period. Conditions of the approval were that Delta must seek accreditation from the Accrediting Council for Independent Colleges and Schools (ACICS), must report annually to the Board of Regents on its progress, and must show evidence of successful ACICS candidacy status within one year of making formal application for candidacy for accreditation.

The school was accredited by the UK Accreditation Service for International Colleges (ASIC) on February 11, 2013.
