= Columbus University (Louisiana) =

U.S. unaccredited distance education institution

Columbus University is an unaccredited distance education institution that has been based at different times in Louisiana and Mississippi.

The institution initially operated in Louisiana under a provision of state law that exempted tax-exempt nonprofit entities from licensing requirements. In November 1998, The Irish Times discussed Columbus in an article, "A dirty dozen - 12 famous diploma mills". After state legislation was revised to require licensing, Columbus University was issued a state license in September 2000, conditioned on seeking accreditation. When Columbus failed to apply for accreditation, its license was revoked and the school was closed down by the state of Louisiana as an illegal diploma mill

Subsequently, Columbus relocated to Mississippi. It is listed by Mississippi authorities as a "non-approved" entity. In 2008 it was reported that the Alabama Department of Postsecondary Education had revoked a license previously granted to Columbus University. In May 2010, WWL-TV in New Orleans reported that the FBI was investigating Columbus University as a diploma mill, and had recently raided the Columbus operations located in a duplex in New Orleans.

Columbus has been accredited by the World Association of Universities and Colleges (WAUC), although this body is not recognized by the United States Department of Education.

In 2003 and 2004, U.S. news media reported that Charles Abell, an Assistant Secretary in the U.S. Department of Defense, listed a master's degree from Columbus University in his official biography and his Senate confirmation statement. Media reports identified Columbus as a diploma mill. The Office of the Secretary of Defense was quoted as defending Abell with the following statement:

In 1998, while working on the Senate Armed Services Committee, Abell chose to pursue higher education to expand his knowledge of human resource management. His goal was to find a program that allowed him to study while working, and the Columbus University program met his objective. He did ask the university about its accreditation and was told they were accredited. Abell has always been forthcoming about his credentials and has clearly demonstrated his commitment and ability to serve in federal government. The Defense Department stands by his service.

Although Abell's case was cited in connection with a General Accounting Office investigation of federal employees with degrees from diploma mills Abell remained in his position. Abell continued in his Defense Department job until August 2005, when he joined the staff of the Senate Committee on Armed Services, where he remained until 2007.

In testimony before the House Oversight Committee relating to the Mitchell Report and Roger Clemens, personal trainer Brian McNamee confirmed that his Ph.D. in behavioral sciences was from Columbus University. He said that he took courses "electronically" and submitted a written dissertation. Representative Tom Davis asked him if Columbus University was a diploma mill, and McNamee responded, "As I found out later on, it appears it is."

Columbus University is on the Texas Higher Education Coordinating Board's list of institutions whose degrees are illegal to use in Texas, because degrees from such institutions have been found to be "fraudulent or substandard".
