= Clarksville School of Theology =

Seminary in Clayton, North Carolina, US

Clarksville School of Theology is a seminary in Clayton, North Carolina. It was founded in Clarksville, Tennessee, and was shut down in 1982 by legal action after it was determined that its curriculum did not meet state standards for granting an academic degree. In the case, Tennessee ex rel. McLemore v. Clarksville School of Theology, the Tennessee Supreme Court upheld broad state regulation of a theological school that trained only ministers, offered no secular courses, and granted only theological degrees.
