= St Christopher Iba Mar Diop College of Medicine =

Previous educational institution in Luton, England

Coordinates: 51.874294°N 0.413606°W

- Type: Private
- Active: 2000–2011
- Founder: Ibrahima Diop Mar
- Parent institution: University El Hadji Ibrahima Niasse; Dakar, Senegal
- Location: Luton, England
- Website: www.stchris.edu

St Christopher Iba Mar Diop College of Medicine was a medical training establishment in Luton, England, as a college within the University El Hadji Ibrahima Niasse of Dakar, Senegal. The Luton, England campus was closed in 2011.

Degrees from this establishment have been listed as unacceptable by the General Medical Council in the United Kingdom and some state governments in the United States.

The medical college is listed in the International Medical Education Directory (IMED). According to the IMED listing, the college was formerly named St. Christopher's College of Medicine, and diplomas prior to 2006 were awarded under that name rather than by the university.

== Accreditation, registration and licensing ==
=== United Kingdom ===
SCIMD was the subject of BBC coverage which highlighted the school as an example of a loophole allowing essentially unregulated medical schools to operate in the UK. This led to an investigation by the General Medical Council, resulting in the withdrawal of registration of at least one doctor, and the publication of a list of schools deemed unacceptable for registration, including St. Christopher. The GMC website was subsequently amended to include a list of schools deemed unacceptable for registration, including St Christopher. SCIMD College of Medicine is now accredited by the UK-based Accreditation Service for International Colleges, which allows foreign students to enter the UK to study.

=== United States ===
- Alabama's Board of Medical Examiners includes the school on its list of disapproved international medical schools whose graduates are unable to receive a license or be accepted as residents or fellows after August 1, 2008.
- Arkansas listed the school on their list of disapproved international medical schools and graduates were unable to receive a license or be accepted as residents or fellows after August 1, 2008.
- California does not list the school as "recognized" medical school. Per the Medical Board of California, "The education and training received at an unrecognized or disapproved medical school is not acceptable for licensure in California."
- Indiana uses California's list of recognized medical schools for the purpose of licensure, thereby making graduates similarly unlicenseable.
- Maine lists the school on their list of "Unaccredited Post-Secondary Educational Institutions".
- Oregon Office of Degree Authorization lists the school on their list of "degree suppliers that do not meet the requirements of ORS 348.609(1)."
- Texas lists the school on their list of "Institutions Whose Degrees are Illegal to Use in Texas" as defined by Texas Code 61.302(11).
