= Columbia State University =

Defunct university in California, US

Columbia State University was a California-based diploma mill that operated from the mid-1980s until its court-ordered closure in 1998.

Although its name implied that Columbia State was a state-supported educational institution, it was not associated with a state government. Rather, it was a private operation owned by Ronald Pellar, a professional hypnotist also known as Ronald Dante who performed on stage under the name Dr. Dante, and who had for a brief time in the late 1960s and early '70s been married to the well-known actress Lana Turner.

In U.S. Senate hearings in 2004, a former employee testified that Columbia State had "no faculty, [...] no curriculum, no classes, no courses, no tests, no one to grade tests, no educational facilities, no library and no academic accreditation." However, she testified that the school's promotional materials claimed that it was accredited, displaying a fake accreditation certificate in the university catalog. Also, the school logo and stationery falsely stated that Columbia State had been established in 1953. The stationery also listed a ten-member "Board of Advisors" that consisted of made-up names and titles. In her testimony, the former employee estimated that the operation had gross income of about $20 million between 1996 and 1998.

Columbia State offered bachelor's, master's, and doctoral degree programs in a variety of fields. Its marketing targeted people who had not finished college or graduate school, advertising that they could qualify for a degree from Columbia State University in as little as 27 days based on their life, work, and academic experience.

According to Senate testimony, at one time Columbia State's letterhead stationery listed Jonas Salk, inventor of the polio vaccine, as a recipient of an honorary Ph.D. degree from Columbia State, but Salk's name was removed after he protested to Ron Pellar.

In 1997, Pellar was convicted of criminal contempt for violating an earlier injunction against making false representations, issued in connection with a "permanent makeup" business and a paralegal training academy, and in 1998 he was sentenced to 67 months in prison for the contempt conviction. In 2004, while still serving that sentence, he pled guilty to nine counts of mail fraud associated with the Columbia State operation. For that guilty plea he received a sentence of eight months in prison and was ordered to pay restitution of $45,835 and forfeit a $1.5 million yacht.

In 2010, Massachusetts attorney and candidate for Congress Jeff Perry disclosed that he had paid Columbia State University "several thousand dollars," studied for alleged courses, and wrote papers under the impression that it was an accredited institution. He later earned legitimate degrees from Curry College and New England School of Law.

== See also ==
- List of unaccredited institutions of higher learning
