= Tyndale Theological Seminary =

- Type: Private seminary
- Affiliations: Christian
- President: Christopher Cone, Patrick Belvill (current)
- Location: Hurst, Texas, United States; 32.823414°N 97.184216°W
- Website: tyndale.edu

Tyndale Theological Seminary is an American private Christian seminary with its campus in Hurst, Texas. It has chosen not to seek state accreditation for religious reasons.

== Accreditation and lawsuit ==
Tyndale's 2007-2008 Academic Catalog states that "Tyndale Theological Seminary and Biblical Institute is not accredited, and has no plans to pursue any type of accreditation for several particular reasons..."

In 1998, Tyndale Theological Seminary was fined $173,000 for issuing degrees as a seminary without a license. The case led to public criticism of the seminary. On August 31, 2007, an 8 to 0 decision by the Supreme Court of Texas returned the $173,000 to Tyndale.
