= List of currencies in Europe =

Eurozone member states ERM II member state with an opt-out ERM II member states Other EU member states States using the euro with a bilateral agreement States which have unilaterally adopted the euro

There are 26 currencies currently used in the 50 countries of Europe. All de facto present currencies in Europe, and an incomplete list of the preceding currency, are listed here.

In Europe, the most commonly used currency is the euro (used by 27 countries); any country entering the European Union (EU) is expected to join the eurozone when they meet the five convergence criteria. Denmark is the only EU member state which has been granted an exemption from using the euro. Czechia, Hungary, Poland, Romania and Sweden have not adopted the Euro either, although unlike Denmark, they have not formally opted out; instead, they fail to meet the ERM II (Exchange Rate Mechanism) which results in the non-use of the Euro. For countries which hope to join the eurozone, there are five guidelines that need to be followed, grouped in the Maastricht criteria.

The United Kingdom's currency, sterling, is rated fourth on Investopedia's list of the top 8 most tradable currencies, and that it is a "little bit more volatile than the euro". It was ranked just ahead of the Swiss franc, ranked fifth, which is used in Switzerland and Liechtenstein, saying that the set up of the Swiss banking "emphasizes the economic and financial stability policies dictated by the governing board of the SNB". Both are in the top 8 major currencies on Bloomberg. Several countries use currencies which translate as "crown": the Czech koruna, the Norwegian krone, the Danish krone, the Icelandic króna, and the Swedish krona.

At present, the euro is legal tender in 21 out of 27 European Union member states, in addition to 6 countries not part of the EU (Monaco, San Marino, Vatican City, Andorra, Kosovo and Montenegro).

== Currencies in Europe ==
In Europe, the euro is used in 27 countries (including Kosovo), while the Swiss franc is used in two countries. All 23 other widely recognized states each have their own national currency. Among the states with limited recognition, Transnistria uses the Transnistrian ruble and Abkhazia uses the Abkhazian apsar. Northern Cyprus does not have its own currency and has adopted the Turkish lira. Similarly, South Ossetia uses the Russian ruble.

Therefore, 26 currencies are used in Europe:

1. Albanian lek
2. Armenian dram
3. Azerbaijani manat
4. Belarusian ruble
5. Bosnia and Herzegovina convertible mark
6. Czech koruna
7. Danish krone
8. Euro
9. Georgian lari
10. Hungarian forint
11. Icelandic króna
12. Kazakhstani tenge
13. Macedonian denar
14. Moldovan leu
15. Norwegian krone
16. Polish złoty
17. Pound sterling
18. Romanian leu
19. Russian ruble
20. Serbian dinar
21. Swedish krona
22. Swiss franc
23. Turkish lira
24. Ukrainian hryvnia
25. Abkhazian apsar (unrecognized)
26. Transnistrian ruble (unrecognized)

== Currencies of states in Europe ==
=== Currencies of widely recognized states in Europe ===
List of all European currencies
Country	Present currency	Currency sign	ISO 4217 code	Fractional unit	Previous currency
Albania	lek	L	ALL	qindarke	none
Andorra	euro	€	EUR	euro cent	none official
Armenia	dram	֏	AMD	luma	ruble
Austria	euro	€	EUR	euro cent	schilling
Azerbaijan	manat	₼	AZN	gapik	ruble
Belarus	ruble	Rbl	BYN	kopeck	old ruble
Belgium	euro	€	EUR	euro cent	franc
Bosnia and Herzegovina	mark	KM	BAM	fening	dinar
Bulgaria	euro	€	EUR	euro cent	lev
Croatia	euro	€	EUR	euro cent	kuna
Cyprus	euro	€	EUR	euro cent	pound
Czech Republic	koruna	Kč	CZK	heller	Czechoslovak koruna
Denmark	krone	kr.	DKK	øre	rigsdaler
Estonia	euro	€	EUR	euro cent	kroon
Finland	euro	€	EUR	euro cent	markka
France	euro	€	EUR	euro cent	franc
Georgia	lari	₾	GEL	tetri	kuponi
Germany	euro	€	EUR	euro cent	mark
Greece	euro	€	EUR	euro cent	drachma
Hungary	forint	Ft.	HUF	fillér	pengő
Iceland	króna	kr.	ISK	aurar	old króna
Ireland	euro	€	EUR	euro cent	punt
Italy	euro	€	EUR	euro cent	lira
Latvia	euro	€	EUR	euro cent	lats
Liechtenstein	franc	Fr	CHF	rappen, also called centime, centesimo, and rap	krone
Lithuania	euro	€	EUR	euro cent	litas
Luxembourg	euro	€	EUR	euro cent	franc
Malta	euro	€	EUR	euro cent	lira
Moldova	leu	L	MDL	bani	cupon
Monaco	euro	€	EUR	euro cent	franc
Montenegro	euro	€	EUR	euro cent	dinar
Netherlands	euro	€	EUR	euro cent	guilder
North Macedonia	denar	DEN	MKD	deni	old denar
Norway	krone	kr.	NOK	øre	speciedaler
Poland	złoty	zł	PLN	grosz	old złoty
Portugal	euro	€	EUR	euro cent	escudo
Romania	leu	lei	RON	bani	old leu
Russia	ruble	₽	RUB	kopeck	Soviet ruble
San Marino	euro	€	EUR	euro cent	lira
Serbia	dinar	DIN	RSD	para	Yugoslav dinar
Slovakia	euro	€	EUR	euro cent	koruna
Slovenia	euro	€	EUR	euro cent	tolar
Spain	euro	€	EUR	euro cent	peseta
Sweden	krona	kr.	SEK	öre	riksdaler
Switzerland	franc	Fr	CHF	rappen, also called centime, centesimo, and rap	none
Turkey	lira	₺	TRY	kuruş	old lira
Ukraine	hryvnia	₴	UAH	kopeck (копійка)	karbovanets
United Kingdom	sterling	£	GBP	penny (pl. pence)	pre-decimal sterling
Vatican City	euro	€	EUR	euro cent	lira

=== Currencies of partially recognized states in Europe ===
List of all unrecognized European currencies
Unrecognized country	De jure country	Present currency	Currency sign	ISO 4217 (or unofficial) code	Fractional unit	Previous currency
Abkhazia	Georgia	apsar Russian ruble (both official)	the apsar has no currency sign ₽	ABK (unofficial) RUB	the apsar has no fractional unit kopeck	Soviet ruble
Kosovo	Serbia	euro Serbian dinar (unofficial, only in Serb majority areas); Albanian lek (unofficial)	€ DIN; L	EUR RSD; ALL	cent Para; Qindarkë	Yugoslav dinar
North Cyprus	Cyprus	Turkish lira euro (unofficial) sterling (unofficial)	₺ € £	TRY EUR; GBP	kuruş cent penny	Cypriot pound
South Ossetia	Georgia	Russian ruble	₽	RUB	kopeck	Soviet ruble
Transnistria	Moldova	Transnistrian ruble	руб	PRB (unofficial)	kopeck	Soviet ruble

== See also ==
- Central banks and currencies of Europe
- Currencies of the European Union
- List of currencies
- List of circulating currencies
- Capital Markets Union
- Banking Union
