= Abbasi (currency) =

Persian silver coin

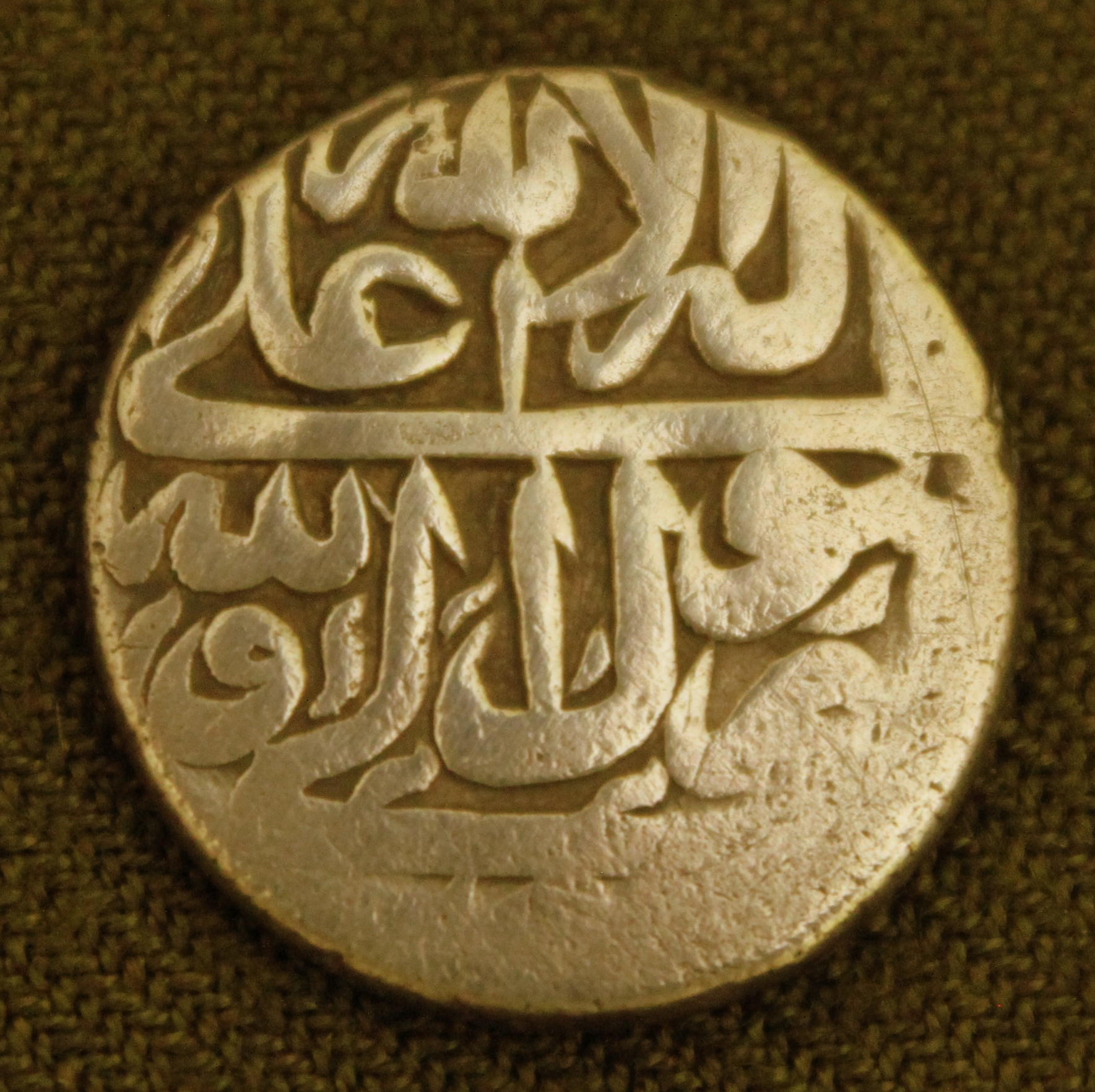

ʿAbbāsī (Persian: عباسی) was a name applied to gold and silver coins in Iran first issued by the Safavid Shah Abbas I (r. 1588–1629). It was in use until the early 20th century. These coins bore no face values and were passed by weight.

While the Iranian abbasi was also widespread in eastern Georgia, which was under the Iranian sway, the coin soon after also came to be minted at the mint in Tiflis (Tbilisi), where they were colloquially known as abazi.

After the Russian annexation of eastern Georgia in 1801, abbasi denominations (one-half abbasi--Muhammad; one quarter abbasi--shahi; one-tenth abbasi--bisti; 1/200th abbasi--dinar) influenced production of the new currency, the Georgian silver (kartuli tetri).

== See also ==
- Georgian abazi

== Sources ==
- Mikaberidze, Alexander (2015). Historical Dictionary of Georgia (2 ed.). Rowman & Littlefield. ISBN 9781442241466.
