= Lasi (letter) =

12th letter of the three Georgian scripts

- Ⴊ ⴊ ლ Ლ

Usage
- Writing system: Georgian script
- Type: Alphabetic
- Language of origin: Georgian language
- Sound values: [ɫ] (before back vowels) [l] (before front vowels)
- In Unicode: U+10AA, U+2D0A, U+10DA, U+1C9A
- Alphabetical position: 12

History
- Time period: c. 430 to present
- Transliterations: L

Other
- Associated numbers: 30
- Writing direction: Left-to-right

Lasi, or Las (Asomtavruli: Ⴊ; Nuskhuri: ⴊ; Mkhedruli: ლ or ჺ; Mtavruli: Ლ Georgian: ლასი, ლას) is the 12th letter of the three Georgian scripts.

In the system of Georgian numerals, it has a value of 30. Lasi commonly represents the voiced velarized alveolar approximant /ɫ/ before back vowels, like the pronunciation of ⟨l⟩ in "feel", and the alveolar lateral approximant /l/ before front vowels, like the pronunciation of ⟨l⟩ in "lord". It is typically romanized with the letter L.

The mkhedruli form has become popular as an emoticon in the Western world due to its resemblance to a paw, hand or fist and as part of an emoticon, is often rendered as: ლ(╹◡╹ლ).

== Letter ==
asomtavruli	nuskhuri	mkhedruli		mtavruli
asomtavruli	nuskhuri	standard	alternative	mtavruli

=== Three-dimensional ===
asomtavruli

nuskhuri

mkhedruli

=== Stroke order ===
asomtavruli

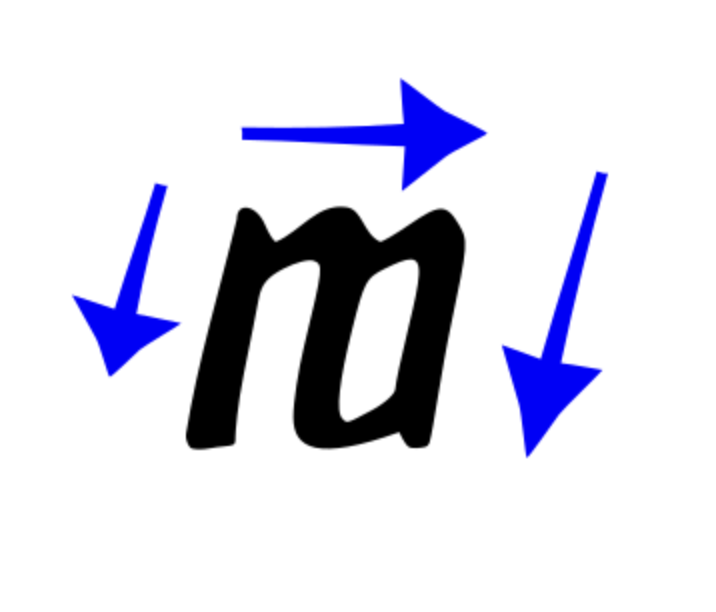
nuskhuri

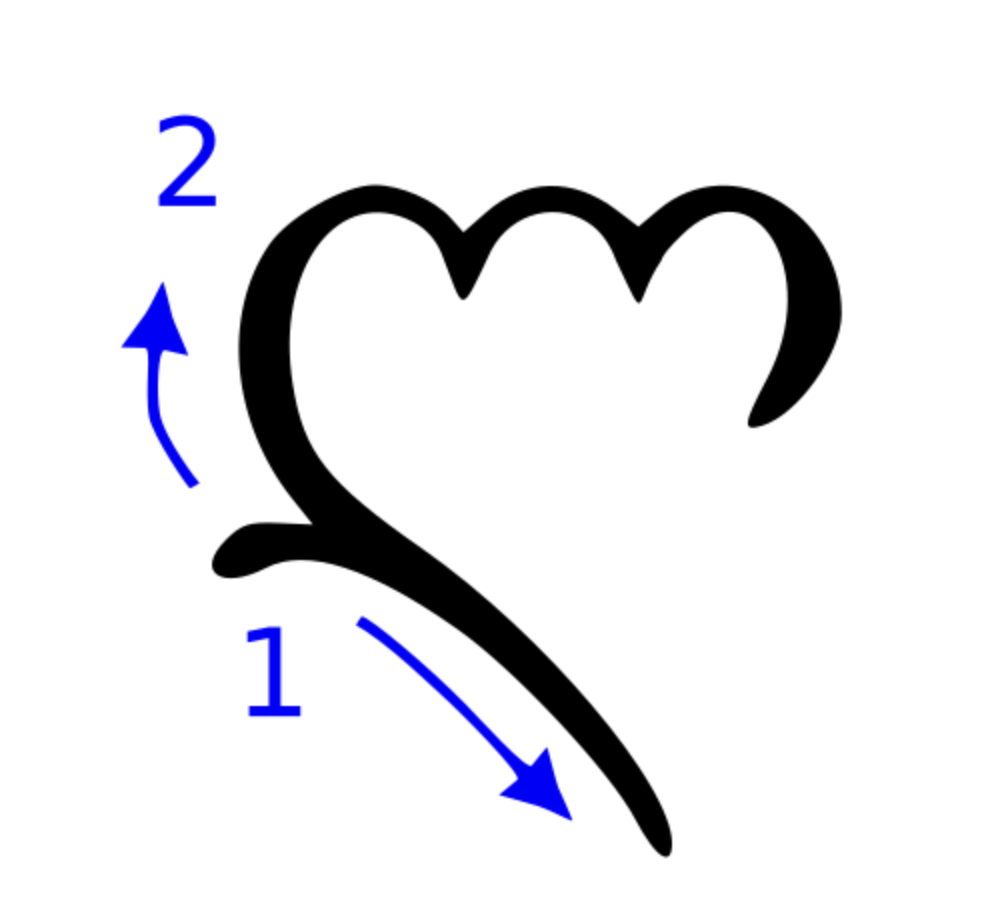
mkhedruli

== Computer encodings ==
Character information
Preview	Ⴊ		ⴊ		ლ		Ლ	
Unicode name	GEORGIAN CAPITAL LETTER LAS		GEORGIAN SMALL LETTER LAS		GEORGIAN LETTER LAS		GEORGIAN MTAVRULI CAPITAL LETTER LAS	
Encodings	decimal	hex	dec	hex	dec	hex	dec	hex
Unicode	4266	U+10AA	11530	U+2D0A	4314	U+10DA	7322	U+1C9A
UTF-8	225 130 170	E1 82 AA	226 180 138	E2 B4 8A	225 131 154	E1 83 9A	225 178 154	E1 B2 9A
Numeric character reference	&#4266;	&#x10AA;	&#11530;	&#x2D0A;	&#4314;	&#x10DA;	&#7322;	&#x1C9A;

== Braille ==
mkhedruli

== Use ==
- Mkhedruli ლ is a currency symbol for Georgian lari. Sometimes, the ₾ sign is used.

== See also ==
- Latin letter L
- Cyrillic letter El
- Lari sign

== Bibliography ==
- Mchedlidze, T. (1) The restored Georgian alphabet, Fulda, Germany, 2013
- Mchedlidze, T. (2) The Georgian script; Dictionary and guide, Fulda, Germany, 2013
- Machavariani, E. Georgian manuscripts, Tbilisi, 2011
- The Unicode Standard, Version 6.3, (1) Georgian, 1991-2013
- The Unicode Standard, Version 6.3, (2) Georgian Supplement, 1991-2013
