= Larization =

Foreign exchange market

Larization is the de-dollarization of Georgian currency – the Lari. The term may have two meanings:

1. Larization - the percentage share of Lari in all currency usage. For example: loan (deposits) larization - the percentage share of loans (deposits) disbursed (received) in Lari, in the total amount of loans (deposits) disbursed (received) by commercial banks. Larization of the economy - percentage share of Lari in the total money supply of the Georgian economy.
2. Larization - a process when the percentage of Lari in the economy is increasing. This process may be triggered by Economic agents in the country who prefer national currency to foreign currency for transactions, prefer to keep (of their own free will) their savings in national currency instead of foreign currency and also take loans (of their own free will) in national currency instead of foreign currency. They set prices on goods (including durable consumption goods: flat, car, etc.) in national currency instead of foreign currency.

As a consequence of increased larization, since 2016 Georgia has witnessed an increase in inflation, due to having an unnaturally high level of monetary supply.
