= Member state of the European Union =

Sovereign countries that are bound by EU laws, rights, and obligations

- Map (clickable)
- Category: Member state
- Location: European Union
- Created: 1952; 74 years ago 1958; 68 years ago 1993; 33 years ago (Note: The first states first formed the European Coal and Steel Community in 1952 and then created the parallel European Economic Community in 1958. Although the latter was later, it is more often considered the immediate predecessor to the EU. The former has always shared the same membership and has since been absorbed by the EU, which was formally established in 1993.)
- Number: 27 (as of 2026)
- Possible types: Republics (21); Monarchies (6)
- Populations: Smallest: Malta, 542,051; Largest: Germany, 84,358,845
- Areas: Smallest: Malta, 316 km^{2} (122 sq mi); Largest: France, 638,475 km^{2} (246,517 sq mi)
- Government: Parliamentary representative democracy (21); Semi-presidential representative democracy (5); Presidential representative democracy (1)

The European Union (EU) is a supranational union of 27 member states that are party to the EU's founding treaties, and thereby subject to the privileges and obligations of membership. They have agreed by the treaties to share their own sovereignty through the institutions of the European Union in certain aspects of government. State governments must agree unanimously in the Council for the union to adopt some policies; for others, collective decisions are made by qualified majority voting. These obligations and sharing of sovereignty (also known by some as "pooling of sovereignty") within the EU make it unique among international organisations, as it has established its own legal order which by the provisions of the founding treaties is both legally binding and supreme on all the member states (after a landmark ruling of the ECJ in 1964). A founding principle of the union is subsidiarity, meaning that decisions are taken collectively if and only if they cannot realistically be taken individually.

Each member country appoints to the European Commission a European commissioner. The commissioners do not represent their member state, but instead work collectively in the interests of all the member states within the EU.

In the 1950s, six core states founded the EU's predecessor European Communities (Belgium, France, Italy, Luxembourg, the Netherlands, and West Germany). The remaining states have acceded in subsequent enlargements. To accede, a state must fulfil the economic and political requirements known as the Copenhagen criteria, which require a candidate to have a democratic government and free-market economy together with the corresponding freedoms and institutions, and respect for the rule of law. Enlargement of the Union is also contingent upon the consent of all existing members and the candidate's adoption of the existing body of EU law, known as the acquis communautaire.

The United Kingdom, which had acceded to the EU's predecessor in 1973, ceased to be an EU member state on 31 January 2020, in a political process known as Brexit. No other member state has withdrawn from the EU and none has been suspended, although some dependent territories or semi-autonomous areas have left.

== List ==
Member state	ISO	Accession	Population	Area (km^{2})	Largest city	GDP (US$ M)	GDP (PPP) per cap.	Currency	Gini	HDI	MEPs	Official languages
Austria	AT	1 January 1995	8,926,000	83,855	Vienna	535,804	73,050	euro	29.1	0.930	20	German
Belgium	BE	Founder	11,566,041	30,528	Brussels	662,183	73,221	euro	33.0	0.951	22	Dutch; French; German
Bulgaria	BG	1 January 2007	6,916,548	110,994	Sofia	66,250	39,185	euro	29.2	0.845	17	Bulgarian
Croatia	HR	1 July 2013	4,036,355	56,594	Zagreb	89,665	48,811	euro	29	0.878	12	Croatian
Cyprus (Note: De facto (though not de jure) excludes the disputed territory of Northern Cyprus and the UN Buffer Zone. See: Cyprus problem.)	CY	1 May 2004	896,000	9,251	Nicosia	23,380	59,858	euro	31.2	0.913	6	Greek; Turkish (Note: The Turkish language is not an official language of the European Union.)
Czechia	CZ	1 May 2004	10,574,153	78,866	Prague	246,953	56,686	koruna	25.8	0.915	21	Czech (Note: Officially recognised minority languages: Slovak; German; Polish; Belarusian; Bulgarian; Croatian; Greek; Hungarian; Romani; Russian; Rusyn; Serbian; Ukrainian; Vietnamese)
Denmark (Note: Excludes the autonomous regions of Greenland, which left the then-EEC in 1985, and the Faroe Islands.)	DK	1 January 1973	5,833,883	43,075	Copenhagen	347,176	83,454	krone	24.7	0.962	15	Danish
Estonia	EE	1 May 2004	1,330,068	45,227	Tallinn	43,044	48,008	euro	36.0	0.905	7	Estonian
Finland (Note: Includes Åland, an autonomous region of Finland.)	FI	1 January 1995	5,527,493	338,424	Helsinki	306,083	64,657	euro	26.9	0.948	15	Finnish; Swedish
France (Note: Includes the 101 departments (Metropolitan France + all Overseas Departments: Guadeloupe, French Guiana, Martinique, Mayotte and La Réunion) and the overseas collectivity of Saint Martin, which are part of the European Union. Excludes the other overseas collectivities and French Austral and Antarctic Lands which are not part of the European Union.)	FR	Founder	67,439,614	632,786	Paris	2,707,074	65,940	euro	32.7	0.920	81	French
Germany	DE	Founder (Note: On 3 October 1990, the territory of the former German Democratic Republic (also called East Germany) acceded to the Federal Republic of Germany to form present-day Germany, automatically becoming part of the EU.)	83,120,520	357,386	Berlin	4,710,032	70,930	euro	31.9	0.959	96	German
Greece	GR	1 January 1981	10,380,000	131,990	Athens	304,084	46,800	euro	34.3	0.908	21	Greek
Hungary	HU	1 May 2004	9,730,772	93,030	Budapest	170,407	46,807	forint	30.0	0.870	21	Hungarian
Ireland	IE	1 January 1973	5,006,324	70,273	Dublin	384,940	127,750	euro	34.3	0.949	14	English; Irish
Italy	IT	Founder	58,968,501	301,338	Rome	1,988,636	60,993	euro	36.0	0.915	76	Italian
Latvia	LV	1 May 2004	1,862,700	64,589	Riga	35,045	43,527	euro	35.7	0.889	9	Latvian
Lithuania	LT	1 May 2004	2,795,680	65,200	Vilnius	53,641	53,624	euro	35.8	0.895	11	Lithuanian
Luxembourg	LU	Founder	633,347	2,586.4	Luxembourg	69,453	151,146	euro	30.8	0.922	6	Luxembourgish (Note: While Luxembourgish is the national language, it is not an official language of the European Union.); French; German
Malta	MT	1 May 2004	516,100	316	Valletta	14,859	72,942	euro	25.8	0.924	6	Maltese; English
Netherlands (Note: Excludes the three special municipalities of the Netherlands (Bonaire, Sint Eustatius, and Saba). Also excludes the three other constituent countries of the Kingdom of the Netherlands (Aruba, Curaçao and Sint Maarten).)	NL	Founder	17,614,840	41,543	Amsterdam	902,355	81,495	euro	30.9	0.955	31	Dutch
Poland	PL	1 May 2004	37,840,001	312,685	Warsaw	565,854	51,629	złoty	34.9	0.906	53	Polish
Portugal (Note: Includes the autonomous regions of the Azores and Madeira.)	PT	1 January 1986	10,749,635	156,597 (Note: The territory of Portugal includes its land, internal waters, and territorial waters.)	Lisbon	364,527	51,853	euro	30.9	0.890	21	Portuguese (Note: Mirandese is an officially recognized minority language within Portugal, awarded an official right-of-use. It is not an official language of the European Union.)
Romania	RO	1 January 2007	19,186,201	238,391	Bucharest	243,698	47,204	leu	31.5	0.845	33	Romanian
Slovakia	SK	1 May 2004	5,422,194	49,035	Bratislava	106,552	45,632	euro	25.8	0.880	15	Slovak
Slovenia	SI	1 May 2004	2,108,977	20,273	Ljubljana	54,154	55,684	euro	31.2	0.931	9	Slovene
Spain (Note: Includes the autonomous community of the Canary Islands; the autonomous cities of Ceuta and Melilla; and the territories comprising the plazas de soberanía.)	ES	1 January 1986	48,946,035	504,030	Madrid	1,647,114	55,089	euro	32.0	0.918	61	Spanish (Note: Basque, Catalan, and Galician are co-official languages with Spanish in their respective territories, allowing their use in EU institutions under limited circumstances.)
Sweden	SE	1 January 1995	10,370,000	449,964	Stockholm	528,929	71,731	krona	25.0	0.959	21	Swedish

=== Former member state ===
List of European Union member states
Country	ISO	Accession	Withdrawal	Population	Area (km^{2})	Largest city	GDP (US$ M)	GDP (PPP) per cap.	Currency	Gini	HDI	Official languages
United Kingdom	GB	1 January 1973	31 January 2020	67,791,400	242,495	London	3,158,938	62,574	sterling	36.6	0.946	English

== Outermost regions ==
There are a number of overseas member state territories which are legally part of the EU, but have certain exemptions based on their remoteness; see Overseas Countries and Territories Association. These "outermost regions" have partial application of EU law and in some cases are outside of Schengen or the EU VAT area—however they are legally within the EU. They all use the euro as their currency.

Territory	Member state	Location	Area km^{2}	Population	GDP per capita (EU=100)	EU VAT Area	Schengen Area
Azores	Portugal	Atlantic Ocean	2,333	236,440	66.7	Yes	Yes
Canary Islands	Spain	Atlantic Ocean	7,447	2,202,048	93.7	No	Yes
French Guiana	France	South America	84,000	295,385	50.5	No	No
Guadeloupe	France	Caribbean Sea	1,710	378,561	50.5	No	No
Madeira	Portugal	Atlantic Ocean	795	250,769	94.9	Yes	Yes
Martinique	France	Caribbean Sea	1,080	349,925	75.6	No	No
Mayotte	France	Indian Ocean	374	320,901		No	No
Réunion	France	Indian Ocean	2,512	885,700	61.6	No	No
Saint Martin	France	Caribbean Sea	52	31,477	61.9	No	No

== Abbreviations ==
Abbreviations have been used as a shorthand way of grouping countries by their date of accession.

- EU15 includes the fifteen countries in the European Union from 1 January 1995 to 30 April 2004. The EU15 comprised Austria, Belgium, Denmark, Finland, France, Germany, Greece, Ireland, Italy, Luxembourg, Netherlands, Portugal, Spain, Sweden, and United Kingdom. Eurostat still uses this expression.
- EU19 includes the countries in the EU15 as well as the Central European member countries of the OECD: Czech Republic, Hungary, Poland, and Slovak Republic.
- EU11 is used to refer to the Central, Southeastern Europe and Baltic European member states that joined in 2004, 2007 and 2013: in 2004 the Czech Republic, Estonia, Hungary, Latvia, Lithuania, Poland, the Slovak Republic, and Slovenia; in 2007 Bulgaria, Romania; and in 2013 Croatia.
- EU27 means all the member states. It was originally used in this sense from 2007 until Croatia's accession in 2013, and during the Brexit negotiations from 2017 until the United Kingdom's withdrawal on 31 January 2020 it came to mean all members except the UK.
- EU28 meant all the member states from the accession of Croatia in 2013 to the withdrawal of the United Kingdom in 2020.

Additionally, other abbreviations have been used to refer to countries which had limited access to the EU labour market.

- A8 is eight of the ten countries that joined the EU in 2004, Czech Republic, Estonia, Hungary, Latvia, Lithuania, Poland, the Slovak Republic, and Slovenia.
- A2 is the countries that joined the EU in 2007, Bulgaria and Romania.

== Changes in membership ==
=== Enlargement ===
Member states of the European Union (dark blue) (1993–present). Pre-1993, the EU was known as the European Communities (sky blue). Animated in order of accession and secession.

According to the Copenhagen criteria, membership of the European Union is open to any European country that is a stable, free-market liberal democracy that respects the rule of law and human rights. Furthermore, it has to be willing to accept all the obligations of membership, such as adopting all previously agreed law (the 170,000 pages of acquis communautaire) and switching to the euro. For a state to join the European Union, the prior approval of all current member states is required. In addition to enlargement by adding new countries, the EU can also expand by having territories of member states, which are outside the EU, integrate more closely (for example in respect to the dissolution of the Netherlands Antilles) or by a territory of a member state which had previously seceded and then rejoined (see withdrawal below).

=== Suspension ===
There is no provision to expel a member state, but TEU Article 7 provides for the suspension of certain rights. Introduced in the Treaty of Amsterdam, Article 7 outlines that if a member persistently breaches the EU's founding principles (liberty, democracy, human rights and so forth, outlined in TEU Article 2) then the European Council can vote to suspend any rights of membership, such as voting and representation. Identifying the breach requires unanimity (excluding the state concerned), but sanctions require only a qualified majority.

The state in question would still be bound by the obligations treaties and the Council acting by majority may alter or lift such sanctions. The Treaty of Nice included a preventive mechanism whereby the council, acting by majority, may identify a potential breach and make recommendations to the state to rectify it before action is taken against it as outlined above. However, the treaties do not provide any mechanism to expel a member state outright.

=== Withdrawal ===
Prior to the Lisbon Treaty, there was no provision or procedure within any of the Treaties of the European Union for a member state to withdraw from the European Union or its predecessor organisations. The Lisbon Treaty changed this and included the first provision and procedure of a member state to leave the bloc. The procedure for a state to leave is outlined in TEU Article 50 which also makes clear that "Any Member State may decide to withdraw from the Union in accordance with its own constitutional requirements". Although it calls for a negotiated withdrawal between the seceding state and the rest of the EU, if no agreement is reached two years after the seceding state notifying of its intention to leave, it would cease to be subject to the treaties anyway (thus ensuring a right to unilateral withdrawal). There is no formal limit to how much time a member state can take between adopting a policy of withdrawal, and actually triggering Article 50.

In a referendum in June 2016, the United Kingdom voted to withdraw from the EU. The UK government triggered Article 50 on 29 March 2017. After an extended period of negotiation and internal political debate the UK eventually withdrew from the EU on 31 January 2020.

Prior to 2016, no member state had voted to withdraw. However, French Algeria, Greenland and Saint-Barthélemy did cease being part of the EU (or its predecessor) in 1962, 1985, and 2012, respectively, due to status changes. The situation of Greenland being outside the EU while still subject to an EU member state had been discussed as a template for the pro-EU regions of the UK remaining within the EU or its single market.

Beyond the formal withdrawal of a member state, there are a number of independence movements such as Catalonia or Flanders which could result in a situation similar to Greenland's. Were a territory of a member state to secede but wish to remain in the EU, some scholars claim it would need to reapply to join as if it were a new country applying from scratch. However, other studies claim internal enlargement is legally viable if, in case of a member state dissolution or secession, the resulting states are all considered successor states. There is also a European Citizens' Initiative that aims at guaranteeing the continuity of rights and obligations of the European citizens belonging to a new state arising from the democratic secession of a European Union member state.

== Representation ==
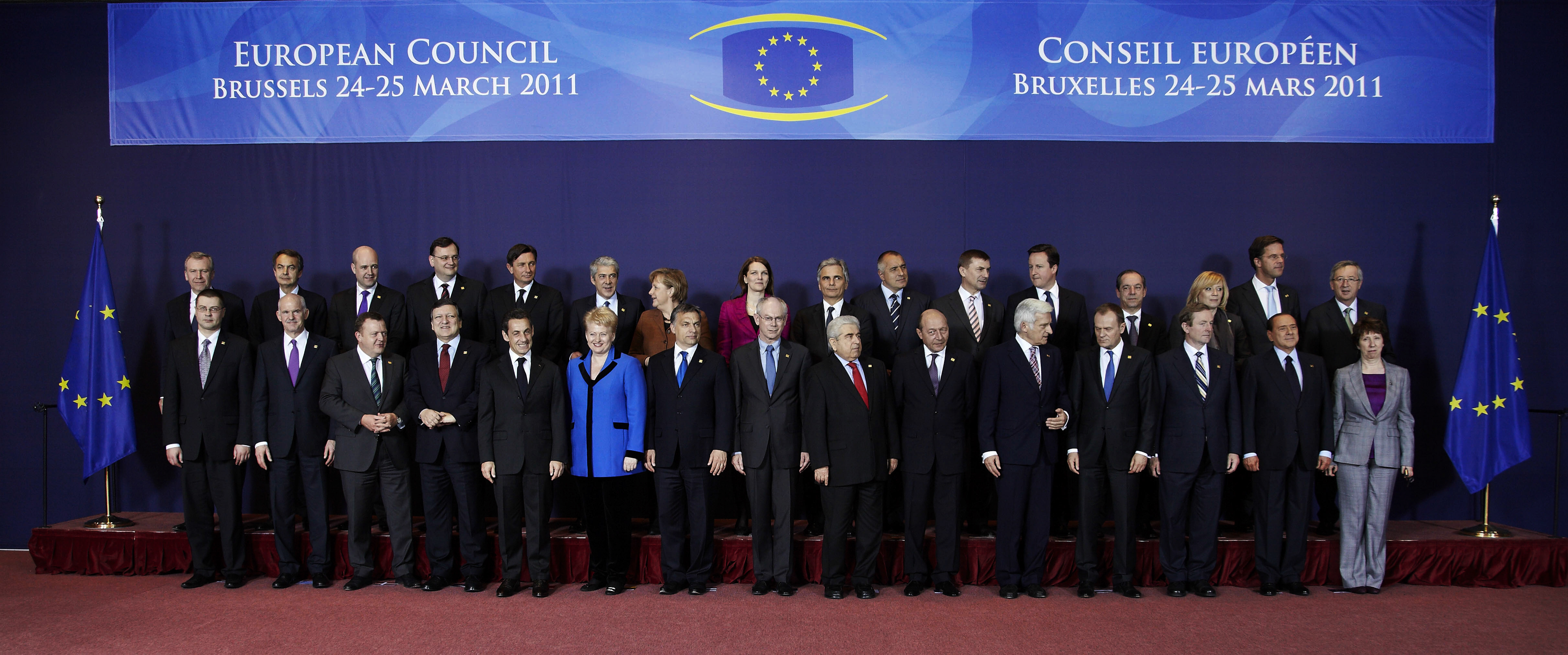
A 2011 'family photo' of the European Council, which comprises the heads of state or government of the member states, along with President of the European Council and the President of the European Commission

Each state has representation in the institutions of the European Union. Full membership gives the government of a member state a seat in the Council of the European Union and European Council. When decisions are not being taken by consensus, qualified majority voting (which requires majorities both of the number of states and of the population they represent, but a sufficient blocking minority can veto the proposal). The Presidency of the Council of the European Union rotates among each of the member states, allowing each state six months to help direct the agenda of the EU.

Similarly, each state is assigned seats in Parliament according to their population (smaller countries receiving more seats per inhabitant than the larger ones). The members of the European Parliament have been elected by universal suffrage since 1979 (before that, they were seconded from national parliaments).

The national governments appoint one member each to the European Commission, the European Court of Justice and the European Court of Auditors. Prospective Commissioners must be confirmed both by the President of the Commission and by the European Parliament; prospective justices must be confirmed by the existing members. Historically, larger member states were granted an extra Commissioner. However, as the body grew, this right has been removed and each state is represented equally. The six largest states are also granted an Advocates General in the Court of Justice. Finally, the Governing Council of the European Central Bank includes the governors of the national central banks (who may or may not be government appointed) of each euro area country.

The larger states traditionally carry more weight in negotiations, however smaller states can be effective impartial mediators and citizens of smaller states are often appointed to sensitive top posts to avoid competition between the larger states. This, together with the disproportionate representation of the smaller states in terms of votes and seats in parliament, gives the smaller EU states a greater power of influence than is normally attributed to a state of their size. However most negotiations are still dominated by the larger states. This has traditionally been largely through the "Franco-German motor" but Franco-German influence has diminished slightly following the influx of new members in 2004 (see G6).

== Sovereignty ==
Article 4

1. In accordance with Article 5, competences not conferred upon the Union in the Treaties remain with the member states.
2. The Union shall respect the equality of member states before the Treaties as well as their national identities, inherent in their fundamental structures, political and constitutional, inclusive of regional and local self-government. It shall respect their essential State functions, including ensuring the territorial integrity of the State, maintaining law and order and safeguarding national security. In particular, national security remains the sole responsibility of each member state.
3. Pursuant to the principle of sincere cooperation, the Union and the member states shall, in full mutual respect, assist each other in carrying out tasks which flow from the Treaties. The member states shall take any appropriate measure, general or particular, to ensure fulfilment of the obligations arising out of the Treaties or resulting from the acts of the institutions of the Union. The member states shall facilitate the achievement of the Union's tasks and refrain from any measure which could jeopardise the attainment of the Union's objectives.

— Article 4 of the Treaty on European Union

While the member states are sovereign, the union partially follows a supranational system for those functions agreed by treaty to be shared. ("Competences not conferred upon the Union in the Treaties remain with the member states"). Previously limited to European Community matters, the practice, known as the 'community method', is currently used in many areas of policy. Combined sovereignty is delegated by each member to the institutions in return for representation within those institutions. This practice is often referred to as 'pooling of sovereignty'. Those institutions are then empowered to make laws and execute them at a European level.

In contrast to some international organisations, the EU's style of integration as a union of states does not "emphasise sovereignty or the separation of domestic and foreign affairs [and it] has become a highly developed system for mutual interference in each other's domestic affairs, right down to beer and sausages.". However, on defence and foreign policy issues (and, pre-Lisbon Treaty, police and judicial matters) less sovereignty is transferred, with issues being dealt with by unanimity and co-operation. Very early on in the history of the EU, the unique state of its establishment and pooling of sovereignty was emphasised by the Court of Justice:

By creating a Community of unlimited duration, having its own institutions, its own personality, its own legal capacity and capacity of representation on the international plane and, more particularly, real powers stemming from a limitation of sovereignty or a transfer of powers from the States to Community, the Member States have limited their sovereign rights and have thus created a body of law which binds both their nationals and themselves...The transfer by the States from their domestic legal system to the Community legal system of the rights and obligations arising under the Treaty carries with it a permanent limitation of their sovereign rights.

— European Court of Justice 1964, in reference to case of Costa v ENEL

The question of whether Union law is superior to State law is subject to some debate. The treaties do not give a judgement on the matter but court judgements have established EU's law superiority over national law and it is affirmed in a declaration attached to the Treaty of Lisbon (the proposed European Constitution would have fully enshrined this). The legal systems of some states also explicitly accept the Court of Justice's interpretation, such as France and Italy, however in Poland it does not override the state's constitution, which it does in Germany. The exact areas where the member states have given legislative competence to the Union are as follows. Every area not mentioned remains with member states.

=== Competences ===
In EU terminology, the term 'competence' means 'authority or responsibility to act'. The table below shows which aspects of governance are exclusively for collective action (through the commission) and which are shared to a greater or lesser extent. If an aspect is not listed in the table below, then it remains the exclusive competence of the member state. Perhaps the best known example is taxation, which remains a matter of state sovereignty.

Competences of the European Union in relation to those of its member states

Exclusive competence

Shared competence

Supporting competence

The Union has exclusive competence to make directives and conclude international agreements when provided for in a Union legislative act as to …
- the customs union
- the establishing of the competition rules necessary for the functioning of the internal market
- monetary policy for the Member States whose currency is the euro
- the conservation of marine biological resources under the common fisheries policy
- Common Commercial Policy
- conclusion of certain international agreements

Member States cannot exercise competence in areas where the Union has done so, that is …
- the internal market
- social policy, for the aspects defined in TFEU
- economic, social and territorial cohesion
- agriculture and fisheries, excluding the conservation of marine biological resources
- environment
- consumer protection
- transport
- trans-European networks
- energy
- the area of freedom, security and justice
- common safety concerns in public health matters, for the aspects defined in TFEU

Union exercise of competence shall not result in Member States being prevented from exercising theirs in …
- research, technological development and (outer) space
- development cooperation, humanitarian aid

The Union coordinates Member States policies or implements supplemental to their common policies not covered elsewhere in …
- the coordination of economic, employment and social policies
- common foreign, security and defence policies

The Union can carry out actions to support, coordinate or supplement Member States' actions in …
- the protection and improvement of human health
- industry
- culture
- tourism
- education, youth, sport and vocational training
- civil protection (disaster prevention)
- administrative cooperation

=== Conditional mutual support ===
Due to the Euro area crisis, some eurozone states were given a bailout from their fellow members via the European Financial Stability Facility and European Financial Stability Mechanism (replaced by the European Stability Mechanism from 2013), but this came with conditions. As a result of the Greek government-debt crisis, Greece accepted a large austerity plan including privatisations and a sell off of state assets in exchange for their bailout. To ensure that Greece complied with the conditions set by the European troika (ECB, IMF, Commission), a 'large-scale technical assistance' from the European Commission and other member states was deployed to Greek government ministries. Some, including the President of the Euro Group Jean-Claude Juncker, stated that "the sovereignty of Greece will be massively limited." The situation of the bailed out countries (Greece, Portugal and Ireland) has been described as being a ward or protectorate of the EU with some such as the Netherlands calling for a formalisation of the situation.

== Multi-speed integration ==
EU integration is not always symmetrical, with some states proceeding with integration ahead of hold-outs. There are several different forms of closer integration both within and outside the EU's normal framework. One mechanism is enhanced cooperation where nine or more states can use EU structures to progress in a field that not all states are willing to partake in. Some states have gained an opt-out in the founding treaties from participating in certain policy areas.

== Political systems ==
Presidential republic Semi-presidential republic Parliamentary republic Constitutional monarchy

The admission of a new state the Union is limited to liberal democracies and Freedom House ranks all EU states as being totally free electoral democracies. All but 4 are ranked at the top 1.0 rating. However, the exact political system of a state is not limited, with each state having its own system based on its historical evolution.

More than half of member states—16 out of 27—are parliamentary republics, while six states are constitutional monarchies, meaning they have a monarch although political powers are exercised by elected politicians. Most republics and all the monarchies operate a parliamentary system whereby the head of state (president or monarch) has a largely ceremonial role with reserve powers. That means most power is in the hands of what is called in most of those countries the prime minister, who is accountable to the national parliament. Of the remaining republics, four operate a semi-presidential system, where competences are shared between the president and prime minister, while one republic operates a presidential system, where the president is head of both state and government.

Parliamentary structure in member states varies: there are 15 unicameral national parliaments and 12 bicameral parliaments. The prime minister and government are usually directly accountable to the directly elected lower house and require its support to stay in office—the exception being Cyprus with its presidential system. Upper houses are composed differently in different member states: it can be directly elected like the Polish senate; indirectly elected, for example, by regional legislatures like the Federal Council of Austria; or unelected, but representing certain interest groups like the National Council of Slovenia. All elections in member states use some form of proportional representation. The most common type of proportional representation is the party-list system.

There are also differences in the level of self-governance for the sub-regions of a member state. Most states, especially the smaller ones, are unitary states; meaning all major political power is concentrated at the national level. 9 states allocate power to more local levels of government. Austria, Belgium and Germany are full federations, meaning their regions have constitutional autonomies. Denmark, Finland, France and the Netherlands are federacies, meaning some regions have autonomy but most do not. Spain and Italy have systems of devolution where regions have autonomy, but the national government retains the legal right to revoke it.

States such as France have a number of overseas territories, retained from their former empires.

== See also ==
- Currencies of the European Union
- Economy of the European Union
- Enlargement of the European Union (1973–2013)
- European Economic Area (integration with the EFTA States)
- History of the European Union
- Microstates and the European Union
- Potential enlargement of the European Union
- Special member state territories and the European Union
- United Kingdom membership of the European Union
- Withdrawal from the European Union
- Member states of NATO
