= Lari sign =

Currency sign of the Georgian lari

₾

Lari sign
- In Unicode: U+20BE ₾ LARI SIGN

Currency
- Currency: Georgian lari

The lari sign (₾) is the currency sign used for the Georgian lari, the official currency of Georgia. The design was presented to the public by the National Bank of Georgia on 8 July 2014. It consists of a stylized Mkhedruli letter lasi, crossed by two lines. Depending on convention in each nation, the symbol can either precede or follow the value, e.g., ₾10 or 10 ₾, with an intervening space.

== History ==
On 27 December 2013, the National Bank of Georgia (NBG) announced a competition for the design of the Georgian lari currency symbol. A temporary commission was established to oversee the process, comprising representatives of the NBG, the Budget and Finance Committee of the Parliament of Georgia, the State Council of Heraldry, the Ministry of Culture and Monument Protection of Georgia, and the Ministry of Education and Science of Georgia. The competition rules were subsequently published, and submissions were accepted until 27 January 2014.

Following the submission period, the commission reviewed the proposed designs, giving priority to concepts based on the Georgian Mkhedruli script. The evaluation criteria included the overall concept and design, conformity with the Georgian alphabet, the presence of elements identifying the currency, ease of reproduction, and compliance with the competition’s rules and guidelines. Prior to selecting the final design, a three-week public online poll was conducted in an advisory capacity to gather broader societal input.

On 8 July 2014, the NBG officially introduced the lari currency sign at a presentation held at its headquarters. The winning design was created by the artist Malkhaz Shvelidze and was presented to the public by NBG Governor Giorgi Kadagidze. The introduction of the sign aimed to promote the national currency domestically and internationally, improve its recognisability, and strengthen public confidence.

== Design ==
The lari sign is based on the Georgian Mkhedruli letter lasi. Its design features a single-arched form intersected by two parallel lines, a characteristic element of many currency symbols in which added strokes distinguish a letter as a monetary sign. In this case, the parallel lines are structurally integrated into the letterform itself. A horizontal stroke forming the lower “leg” provides visual balance to the otherwise curved upper section, contributing to a stable and recognisable shape.

The letter was deliberately stylised and simplified to ensure clarity, ease of writing, and adaptability across different media, supporting its use in both written and digital contexts. While its exact appearance varies depending on the typeface, the National Bank of Georgia specified during its submission to Unicode that the two parallel lines must remain distinct and not merge into a single stroke, as occurs in some other currency symbols.

The winning design was created by Malkhaz Shvelidze. The Lari Sign Temporary Commission also recognised a group of co-authors who contributed to the concept: David Birman, Alexander Sukiasov, Avtandil Sharvadze, Akaki Razmadze, Giorgi Kurtanidze, Zurab Giorgadze, David Virabian, Giorgi Bokhua, Giorgi Qoqrashvili, Kakhaber Kobidze, Lasha Danelia, Ivane Mgaloblishvili, Gocha Chogovadze, David Beitrishvili, Tengiz Gogolashvili, Ilia Martashvili, and Anatoli Giorgadze.
