= Georgian lari =

Currency of Georgia

ქართული ლარი (Georgian)
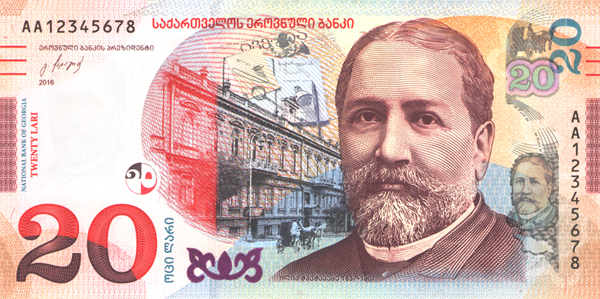

ISO 4217
- Code: GEL (numeric: 981)
- Subunit: 0.01

Units of account
- Base unit: lari
- Plural: The language(s) of this currency do(es) not have a morphological plural distinction.
- Symbol: ₾, ლ, (GEL)
- Subunit
- 1/100: tetri

Denominations
- Banknotes
- Freq. used: ₾5, ₾10, ₾20, ₾50, ₾100
- Rarely used: ₾1, ₾2, ₾200
- Coins: 5, 10, 20, 50 tetri, ₾1, ₾2

Demographics
- Date of introduction: 1995
- Replaced: Georgian kuponi (კუპონი)
- User(s): Georgia

Issuance
- Central bank: National Bank of Georgia
- Website: www.nbg.gov.ge
- Printer: Oberthur Fiduciaire
- Website: www.oberthur-fiduciaire.com

Valuation
- Inflation: 4.0% (December 2025)
- Source: National Bank of Georgia

The lari (Georgian: ლარი, pronounced [ˈɫaɾi]; ISO 4217: GEL, sign: ₾) is the currency of Georgia. It is divided into 100 tetri (თეთრი). The name lari is an old Georgian word denoting a hoard, property, while tetri is an old Georgian monetary term (meaning 'white') used in ancient Colchis from the 6th century BC. Earlier Georgian currencies include the maneti (Georgian: მანეთი), abazi (აბაზი), and kuponi (კუპონი).

== Kuponi ==
Georgia replaced the Soviet ruble on 5 April 1993, with the kuponi (Georgian: კუპონი) at par. This currency consisted only of banknotes, had no subdivisions and suffered from hyperinflation. Notes were issued in denominations between 1 and 1 million kuponi, including the somewhat unusual 3,000, 30,000 and 150,000 kuponi.

Highest denominations of each series of the Georgian kuponi

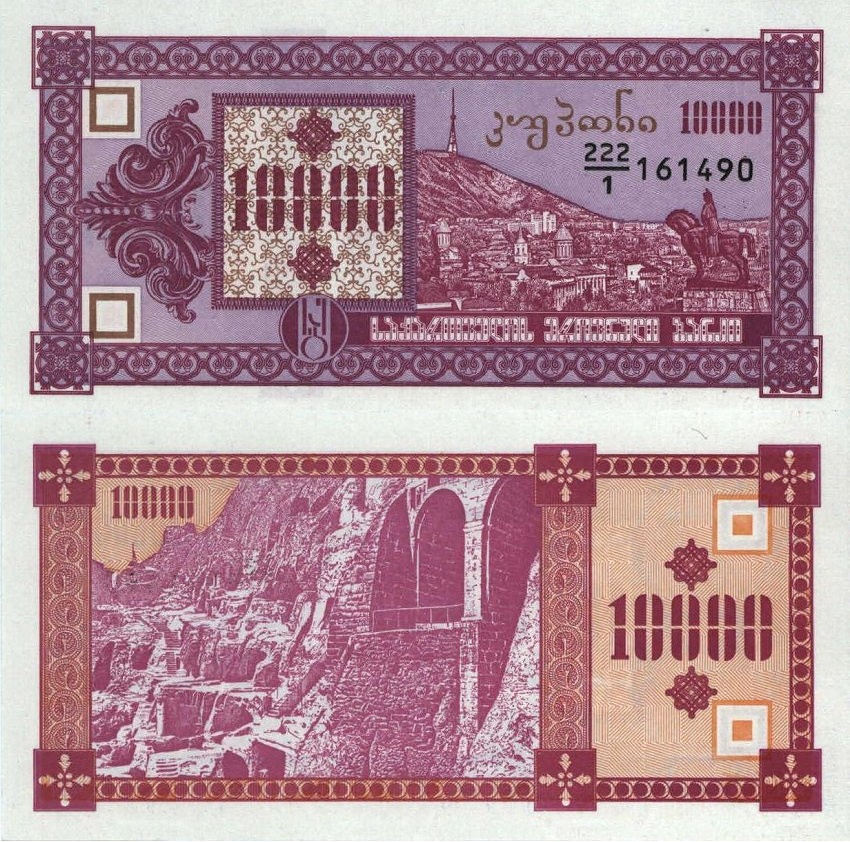
10 000 kuponi, 1993 (1st issue)

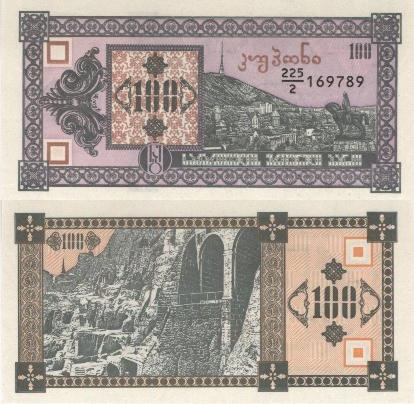
100 kuponi, 1993 (2nd issue)

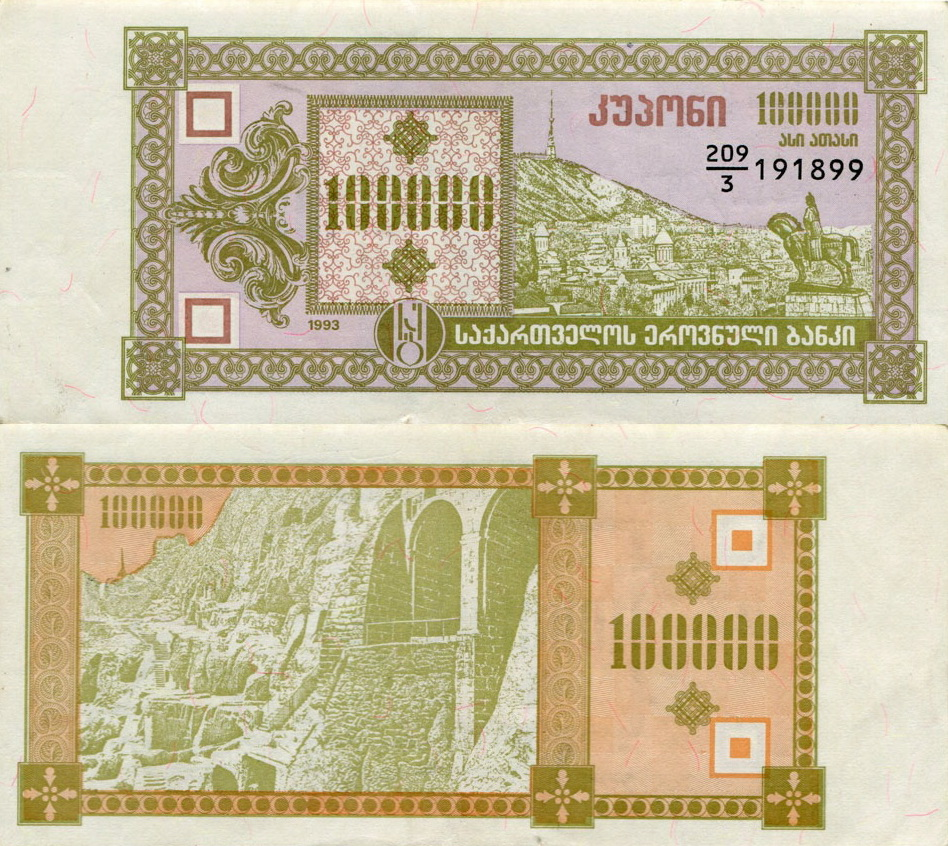
100 000 kuponi, 1993 (3rd issue)

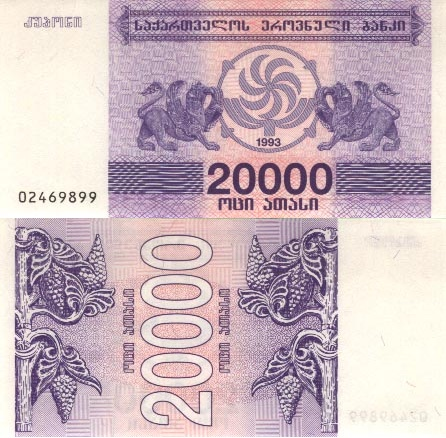
20 000 kuponi, 1993 (4th issue)

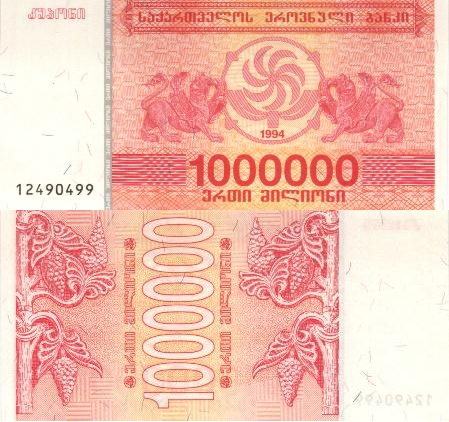
1 000 000 kuponi, 1994

== Lari ==
On 2 October 1995, the government of Eduard Shevardnadze replaced the provisional coupon currency with the lari, at a rate of one million to one. It has remained fairly stable since then.

=== Lari sign ===
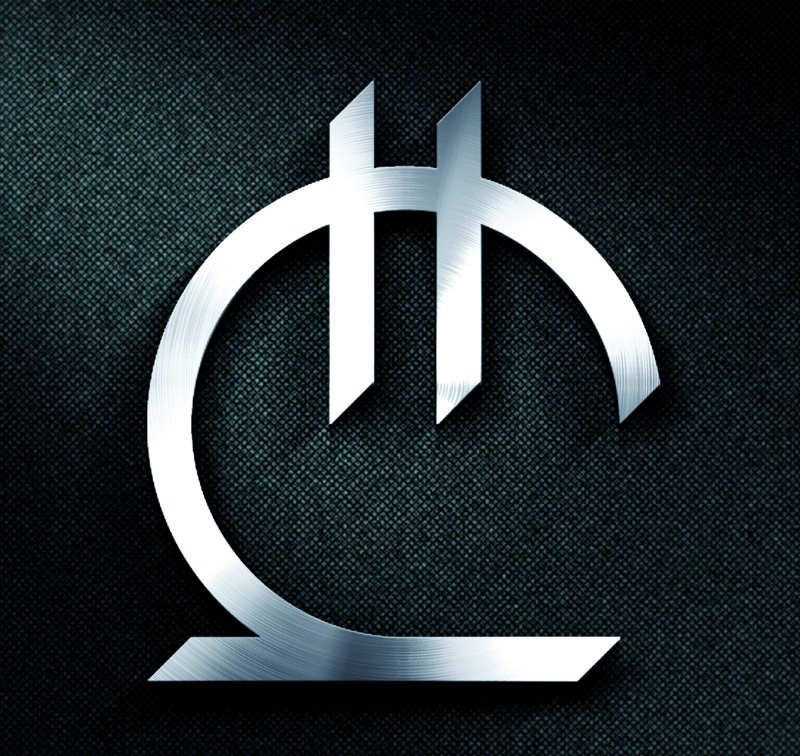
The Georgian lari currency sign, introduced on 8 July 2014.

The NBG announced the lari sign competition in December 2013. The temporary commission consisted of representatives of NBG, the Budget and Finance Committee of the Parliament of Georgia, the State Council of Heraldry, the Ministry of Culture and Monument Protection of Georgia and the Ministry of Education and Science of Georgia.

On 8 July 2014, Giorgi Kadagidze, Governor of the National Bank of Georgia (NBG), unveiled the winning proposal for the sign of the national currency to the public. The author of the winning sign was professional artist-ceramist, Malkhaz Shvelidze.

In choosing the winning sign, the commission gave priority to the samples based on the Georgian Mkhedruli character and made a point of the following criteria: conception, design, accordance with Georgian alphabet, existence of elements marking the currency, ease of construction, and observance of requests and recommendations determined by competition rules.

The lari sign is based on an arched letter ლ (Lasi) of the Georgian script. It is common international practice for a currency sign to consist of a letter, crossed by one or two parallel lines. Two parallel lines crossing the letter Lasi are the basic components of the lari sign. The so-called “leg” of the letter, represented by a horizontal line, is a necessary attribute of the sign, adding monumental stability to the upper dynamic arc. The form of the letter is transformed in order to simplify its perception and implementation as a lari sign.

On 18 July 2014, Giorgi Melashvili, executive director of the National Bank of Georgia, sent a request letter to the Unicode Consortium to register the symbol in the Currency Symbols block of the Unicode Standard as

₾ U+20BE GEORGIAN LARI SIGN

On 17 June 2015, the Unicode Consortium released Unicode V8.0, which includes the lari sign as

U+20BE ₾ LARI SIGN

=== Coins ===
Coins are issued in denominations of 5, 10, 20 and 50 tetri, as well as 1 and 2 lari.

The National Bank of Georgia announced on 5 October 2018 that it would discontinue circulation of 1 and 2 tetri coins as of 1 January 2021, and that these coins would lose their legal tender status. 1 and 2 tetri coins could be exchanged at the National Bank of Georgia and commercial banks in Georgia within one year from 1 January 2021, and can only be exchanged at the National Bank of Georgia from 1 January 2022. According to the new regulations on cash payments introduced by the National Bank of Georgia on 1 January 2019, 1 and 2 tetri are rounded to 0, and 3, 4, 6 and 7 tetri are rounded to 5.

The National Bank of Georgia announced on 12 November 2015 that, effective 1 January 2018, the old 50 tetri coin, issued since 1995, would be withdrawn from circulation and the coins would lose their legal tender status. The old 50 tetri coin were exchangeable at the National Bank of Georgia and commercial banks of Georgia within one year from 1 January 2018, and from 1 January 2019 only at the National Bank of Georgia.

Image		Value	Technical parameters			Description			Issued from	Withdrawn
Obverse	Reverse	Value	Diameter (mm)	Mass (g)	Composition	Edge	Obverse	Reverse	Issued from	Withdrawn
First series (1993)
		1 tetri	15.00	1.38	Stainless steel	Smooth	Vine tendril; value	Borjgali over a tree of life; year of issue; lettering: საქართველოს რესპუბლიკა; Republic of Georgia	1996	2021
		2 tetri	17.50	1.90	Stainless steel	Smooth	Peacock; value	Borjgali over a tree of life; year of issue; lettering: საქართველოს რესპუბლიკა; Republic of Georgia	1996	2021
		5 tetri	20.00	2.50	Stainless steel	Smooth	Golden lion from Alazani valley; value	Borjgali over a tree of life; year of issue; lettering: საქართველოს რესპუბლიკა; Republic of Georgia	1996	Current
		10 tetri	22.00	3.00	Stainless steel	Smooth	Saint Mammes riding a lion from Gelati; Monastery; value	Borjgali over a tree of life; year of issue; lettering: საქართველოს რესპუბლიკა; Republic of Georgia	1996	Current
		20 tetri	25.00	5.00	Stainless steel	Smooth	Stag by Niko; Pirosmani; value	Borjgali over a tree of life; year of issue; lettering: საქართველოს რესპუბლიკა; Republic of Georgia	1996	Current
		50 tetri	19.00	2.50	Brass	Smooth	Griffin from Samtavisi; Cathedral; value	Borjgali over a tree of life; year of issue; lettering: საქართველოს რესპუბლიკა; Republic of Georgia	1996	2018
Second series (2006)
		50 tetri	24.00	6.52	Cupronickel	Reeded lettering: საქართველო ★ GEORGIA ★ საქართველო ★ GEORGIA ★	Value	Coat of arms; sun beams; year of issue; lettering: საქართველო	2006	Current
		₾1	26.20	7.85	Cupronickel	Reeded lettering: საქართველო ★ GEORGIA ★ საქართველო ★ GEORGIA ★	Half-milled; value	Coat of arms; year of issue; lettering: საქართველო	2006	Current
		₾2	27.00	8.00	Outer: Cupronickel	Reeded lettering: საქართველო ★ GEORGIA ★ საქართველო ★ GEORGIA ★	Sun rays; value	Coat of arms; year of issue; lettering: საქართველო	2006	Current
		₾2	27.00	8.00	Inner: Cu-Al-Ni	Reeded lettering: საქართველო ★ GEORGIA ★ საქართველო ★ GEORGIA ★	Sun rays; value	Coat of arms; year of issue; lettering: საქართველო	2006	Current
For table standards, see the coin specification table.

=== Banknotes ===
==== Current series ====
Between November 2016 and October 2019 the National Bank of Georgia released five banknotes (in denominations of ₾5, ₾10, ₾20, ₾50, and ₾100), composing a new complete set. The 2016–2019 series lari notes were produced in collaboration with Oberthur Technologies, Giesecke+Devrient and De La Rue.

Upgraded series (2016–2019)
Image		Value	Dimensions (mm)	Main colour	Description		Issued from	First issued
Obverse	Reverse	Value	Dimensions (mm)	Main colour	Obverse	Reverse	Issued from	First issued
		₾5	122 × 62	Brown	Ivane Javakhishvili; Tbilisi State University	Threshing & Fisherman in a Red Shirt (Niko Pirosmani)	2017	1 Sep 2017
		₾10	127 × 64	Blue	Akaki Tsereteli; Tsereteli's poem Spring	Imereti - My Mother (David Kakabadze)	2019	1 Oct 2019
		₾20	132 × 66	Red	Ilia Chavchavadze; Iveria & Sakartvelos Moambe newspaper	Vakhtang Gorgasali statue; Panorama and map of Tbilisi (Vakhushti)	2016	1 Feb 2016
		₾50	137 × 68	Green	Queen Tamar; Vardzia monastery	Sagittarius miniature; 12th-century manuscript	2016	1 Feb 2016
		₾100	142 × 70	Purple	Shota Rustaveli; The; Knight in the Panther's Skin	Georgian National Opera; Theater; Tavisupleba score	2016	1 Nov 2016
For table standards, see the banknote specification table.

==== Earlier issues ====
The National Bank of Georgia announced that banknotes of 1, 2, 5, 10, 20, 50 and 100 lari issued between 1995 and 1999 will no longer be legal tender on 1 January 2022. These currencies can only be exchanged at the National Bank of Georgia from 1 January 2022.

Image		Value	Dimensions (mm)	Main colour	Description		Issued from	First issued	Withdrawn
Obverse	Reverse	Value	Dimensions (mm)	Main colour	Obverse	Reverse	Issued from	First issued	Withdrawn
		₾1	115 × 61	Teal	Niko Pirosmanashvili	Tbilisi panorama; Stag by Pirosmani	2002–2007	5 Aug 2002	1 January 2022
		₾2	115 × 61	Peach	Zacharia Paliashvili; Abesalom da Eteri	National Opera Theater	2002	5 Aug 2002	1 January 2022
		₾5	115 × 61	Brown	Ivane Javakhishvili	Tbilisi State University	2002–2013	5 Aug 2002	1 January 2022
		₾10	125 × 63	Blue	Akaki Tsereteli; Swallow; branches	Imereti - My Mother (David Kakabadze)	2002–2013	5 Aug 2002	1 January 2022
		₾20	131 × 65	Maroon	Ilia Chavchavadze; Iveria & Sakartvelos; Moambe newspaper	Vakhtang Gorgasali statue; Panorama and map of Tbilisi (Vakhushti)	2002–2013	5 Aug 2002	1 January 2022
		₾50	135 × 66	Olive	Queen Tamar; Griffin	Sagittarius miniature; 12th-century manuscript	2004–2013	29 Nov 2004	1 January 2022
		₾100	140 × 67	Green	Shota Rustaveli; Angels with cross	Daniel in the den of lions from Martvili monastery	2004–2014	29 Nov 2004	1 January 2022
		₾200	146 × 72	Yellow	Kakutsa Cholokashvili; Relief images	Sokhumi; iconostasis from Tsebelda	2006	15 Apr 2007	Current
		₾500	143 × 66	Blue green	David IV	Early Georgian inscriptions; cross	1995	Unissued	
For table standards, see the banknote specification table.

Current GEL exchange rates
From Google Finance:	AUD CAD CHF CNY EUR GBP HKD JPY USD RUB TRY
From Yahoo! Finance:	AUD CAD CHF CNY EUR GBP HKD JPY USD RUB TRY
From XE.com:	AUD CAD CHF CNY EUR GBP HKD JPY USD RUB TRY
From OANDA:	AUD CAD CHF CNY EUR GBP HKD JPY USD RUB TRY

Georgian kupon lari
Preceded by: Georgian kupon lari Reason: Replacement of the Soviet and Russian ruble with a transitional currency	Currency of Georgia; April 5, 1993 – October 2, 1995	Succeeded by: Georgian lari Reason: Hyperinflation; Ratio: 1 Georgian lari = 1,000,000 Georgian kuponi

Georgian lari
Preceded by: Georgian kuponi lari Reason: Hyperinflation; Ratio: 1 Georgian lari = 1,000,000 Georgian kuponi lari	Currency of Georgia; October 2, 1995 –	Succeeded by: Current

== See also ==
- Economy of Georgia (country)
- Larization
