= Currencies of the European Union =

Map of currencies used within the EU and dates of Euro adoption States which used the euro from 1999 (currency entered circulation 2002) States which subsequently adopted the euro States using other currencies

There are seven currencies of the European Union as of 2026 used officially by member states. The euro is used by a majority of EU member states, with the remaining states operating independent monetary policies. Those European Union member states that have adopted it are known as the eurozone, and share the European Central Bank (ECB). The ECB and the national central banks of all EU countries, including those who operate an independent currency, are part of the European System of Central Banks.

== Euro ==
The euro is the result of the European Union's project for economic and monetary union that came fully into being on 1 January 2002 and it is now the currency used by the majority of the European Union's member states, with all but Denmark (which has an opt-out in the EU treaties) bound to adopt it. It is the currency used by the institutions of the European Union and in the failed treaty on a European Constitution it was to be included with the symbols of Europe as the formal currency of the European Union. The euro is also widely used by other states outside the EU.

Except for Denmark, all current and future members of the EU are obliged to adopt the Euro as their currency, thus replacing their current ones. The relationship between euro and non-euro states has been on debate both during the United Kingdom's membership (as a large opt-out state) and in light of withdrawal from the EU and how that impacts the balance of power between the countries inside and those outside the eurozone, avoiding a eurozone caucus out-voting non-euro states. Former member United Kingdom had called for the EU treaties to recognise the EU as a "multicurrency union", which sparked concerns about undermining euro adoption in remaining countries.

== Current currencies ==
Map of currencies used within the EU and dates of Euro adoption States which used the euro from 1999 (currency entered circulation 2002) States which subsequently adopted the euro States using other currencies

EU GDP by currency area (2023)
1. Eurozone (84.9%)
2. Poland (4.40%)
3. Sweden (3.10%)
4. Others (7.60%)

The following are official currencies used within the borders of the 27 EU member states:

Currency	Region	Symbol	ISO	Peg	Notes
Euro	(European Union) Eurozone: Austria; Belgium; Bulgaria; Croatia; Cyprus; Estonia; Finland; France; Germany; Greece; Ireland; Italy; Latvia; Lithuania; Luxembourg; Malta; Netherlands; Portugal; Slovakia; Slovenia; Spain	€	EUR	Floating	Also used by EU institutions.
Czech koruna	Czech Republic	Kč	CZK	Floating	
Danish krone	Denmark	kr	DKK	ERM II	Opt-out from adopting the euro.
Hungarian forint	Hungary	Ft	HUF	Floating	
Polish złoty	Poland	zł	PLN	Floating	
Romanian leu	Romania	Leu	RON	Floating	
Swedish krona	Sweden	kr	SEK	Floating	

Note that there are other currencies used in overseas territories of member states. Those territories however are not part of the European Union proper (legally subject to all its law) so are not listed here.

== Historical currencies ==
Currency	State	Symbol	ISO	Yielded on	Rate to euro	Notes
Austrian schilling	Austria	S or öS	(ATS)	1999/2002	13.7603	
Belgian franc	Belgium	fr.	(BEF)	1999/2002	40.3399	(Note: Interchangeable with Luxembourgian franc (BLEU).)
Bulgarian lev	Bulgaria	лв	(BGN)	2026	1.95583	(Note: Traded under a currency board since 1997, with a fixed exchange rate against the euro and previously the Deutsche Mark.)
Croatian kuna	Croatia	kn	(HRK)	2023	7.5345	
Cypriot pound	Cyprus	£	(CYP)	2008	0.585274	
Dutch guilder	Netherlands	ƒ or fl.	(NLG)	1999/2002	2.20371	
Estonian kroon	Estonia	Kr	(EEK)	2011	15.6466	
Finnish markka	Finland	mk	(FIM)	1999/2002	5.94573	
French franc	France	₣, F or FF	(FRF)	1999/2002	6.55957	(Note: Linked to Monegasque franc, (Note: Replaced alongside French franc with euro) both valid in France, Andorra and Monaco.)
German mark	Germany	DM	(DEM)	1999/2002	1.95583	
Greek drachma	Greece	Δρχ., Δρ. or ₯	(GRD)	2001/2002	340.75	
Irish pound	Ireland	£	(IEP)	1999/2002	0.787564	(Note: Was interchangeable with pound sterling until 1979.)
Italian lira	Italy	₤, L. or LIT	(ITL)	1999/2002	1,936.27	(Note: Linked to Sammarinese & Vatican lira, (Note: Replaced alongside Italian lira with euro) all valid in Italy, San Marino and the Vatican City.)
Latvian lats	Latvia	Ls	(LVL)	2014	0.702804	
Lithuanian litas	Lithuania	Lt	(LTL)	2015	3.4528	
Luxembourgian franc	Luxembourg	fr. or F	(LUF)	1999/2002	40.3399	(Note: Interchangeable with Belgian franc (BLEU).)
Maltese lira	Malta	₤ or Lm	(MTL)	2008	0.4293	
Pound sterling	United Kingdom	£	GBP	was part of EU until Brexit		(Note: Was interchangeable with Irish pound until 1979.)
Portuguese escudo	Portugal	$	(PTE)	1999/2002	200.482	
Slovak koruna	Slovakia	Sk	(SKK)	2009	30.126	
Slovenian tolar	Slovenia	T	(SIT)	2007	239.64	
Spanish peseta	Spain	₧	(ESP)	1999/2002	166.386	
European Currency Unit	Accounting only	₠, ECU or XEU	(XEU)	1999/2002	1	(Note: Accounting currency alongside national currencies until the euro introduction.)

== See also ==
- Economy of the European Union
- List of currencies in Europe
- List of circulating currencies
