= Georgian abazi =

Silver coin

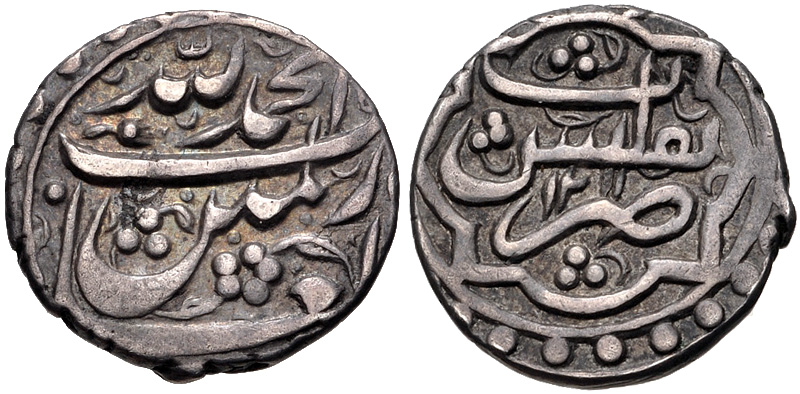
Sirma abazi of Heraclius II as King of Kartli-Kakheti, minted in Tiflis (Tbilisi), dated 1796/7. Obv: religious invocation. Rev: Mint formula and AH date.

Abazi (Georgian: აბაზი) was a Georgian silver coin, deriving its name and existence from the Iranian abbasi, which was in use from the early 17th century into the early 19th.

The name abazi derives from the Iranian abbasi, a silver coin first issued by the Safavid shah Abbas I (1581–1629), who was responsible for consolidating the Iranian influence over Georgia. It was subdivided into 200 dinar. Other denominations were the puli ("copper") of 5 dinar and the bisti of 20 dinar.

Though the Iranian abbasi was widespread in eastern Georgia, it was initially minted in mainland Iran (i.e. Tabriz). When the abbasi came to be minted at the royal mint in Tiflis (Tbilisi), they became colloquially known as abazi. These abazi coins at first weighed 7.8 grams but by the end of the 18th century their weight reportedly declined to just 3 grams.

Coins featured, except the Islamic profession of faith (shahada) and/or the names of the Shiite Imams on the front, the name of the Iranian shah and the date on the reverse.

After the absorption of Georgia into the Russian Empire in 1801, the currency was not immediately replaced by the Russian ruble. Instead, a final issue of coins was made between 1804 and 1833 in denominations of 5, 10 and 20 dinar in copper and 100, 200 and 400 dinar in silver. These were related to the Russian currency at a rate of 10 dinar to the kopeck. The Russian ruble was introduced in 1833 at a rate of 5 abazi = 1 ruble. However, the Georgian coins continued to circulate into the 1860s.

== See also ==
- Safavid Georgia
- Georgia–Persia relations

== Bibliography ==
- Mikaberidze, Alexander (2015). Historical Dictionary of Georgia (2 ed.). Rowman & Littlefield. ISBN 9781442241466.
