= Georgian kuponi =

Former currency of Georgia, used 1993-1995

ქართული კუპონი (Georgian)
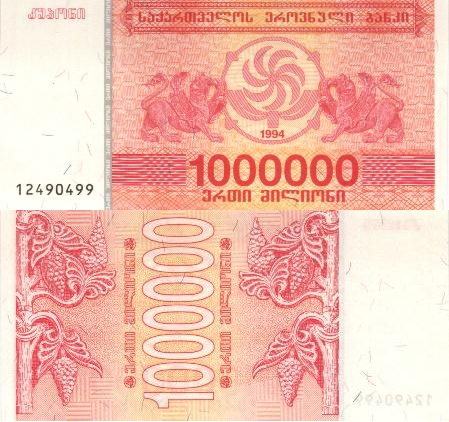
- 1 million kuponi (1 lari; 1994)

ISO 4217
- Code: GEK
- Plural: The language(s) of this currency do(es) not have a morphological plural distinction.

Denominations
- Banknotes: 1, 3, 5, 10, 50, 100, 250, 500, 1,000, 2,000, 3,000, 5,000, 10,000, 20,000, 25,000, 30,000, 50,000, 100,000, 150,000, 250,000, 500,000, 1,000,000 kuponi

Demographics
- Date of introduction: 5 April 1993
- Replaced: Russian rouble (1 RUR = 1 GEK)
- Date of withdrawal: 2 October 1995
- Replaced by: Georgian lari (1 GEL = 1,000,000 GEK)
- User(s): Georgia (except Abkhazia and South Ossetia)

Issuance
- Central bank: National Bank of Georgia
- Website: www.nbg.gov.ge

Valuation
- Inflation: Unknown; at least 50%
- This infobox shows the latest status before this currency was rendered obsolete.

The kuponi (Georgian: კუპონი k’up’oni, "coupon"; ISO 4217: GEK) was the currency of Georgia. It was introduced on 5 April 1993, replacing the Russian ruble at par. This currency was temporary, with no coins nor subdivisions. It also suffered from hyperinflation.

== Banknotes ==
Kuponi banknotes were issued in five series: four in 1993 and one in 1994. Each denomination was introduced in no more than two series.

=== First 1993 series ===
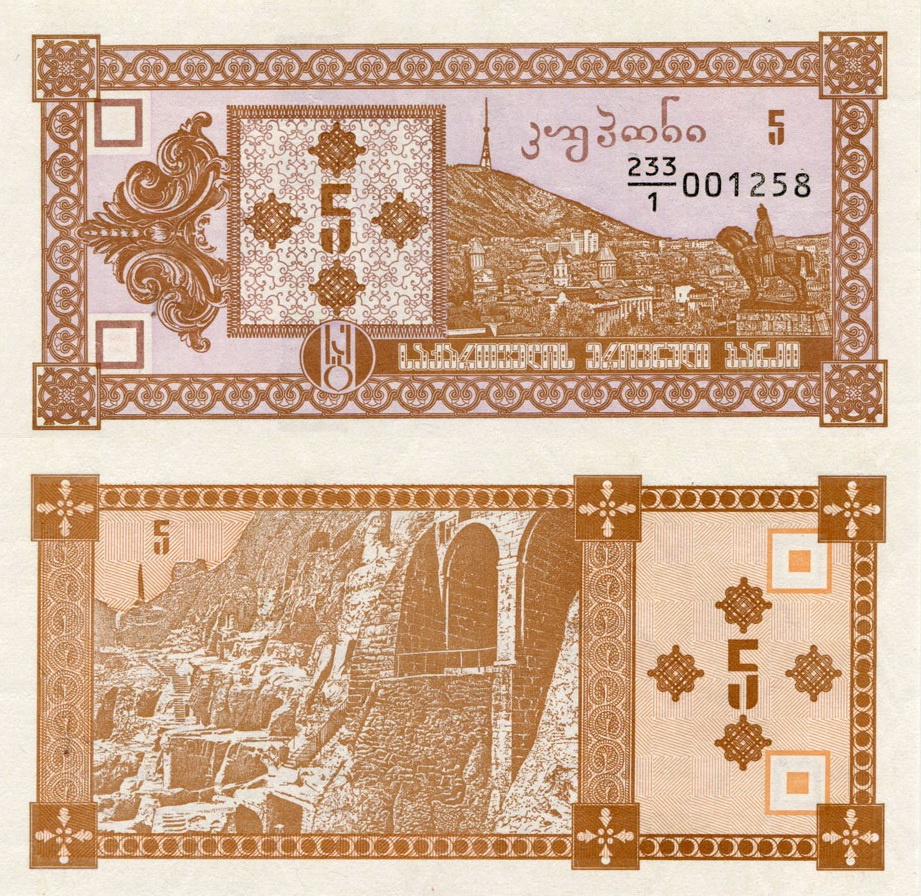
5 kuponi

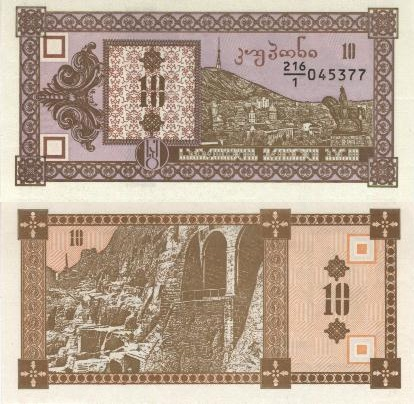
10 kuponi

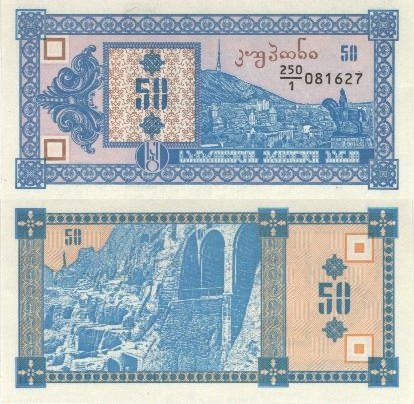
50 kuponi

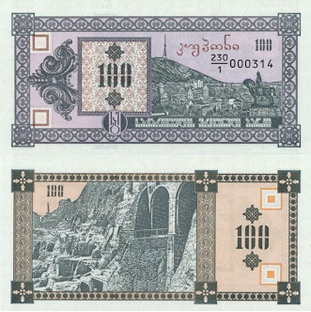
100 kuponi

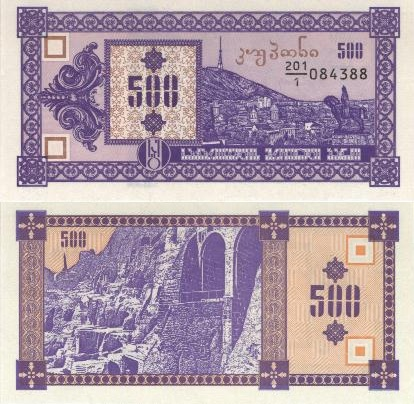
500 kuponi

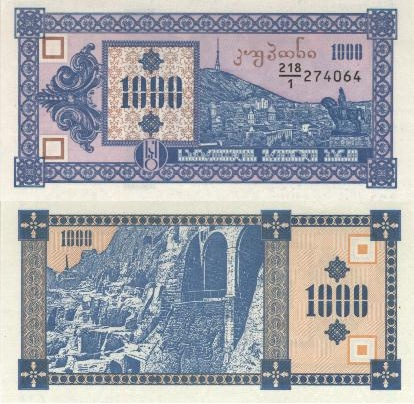
1,000 kuponi

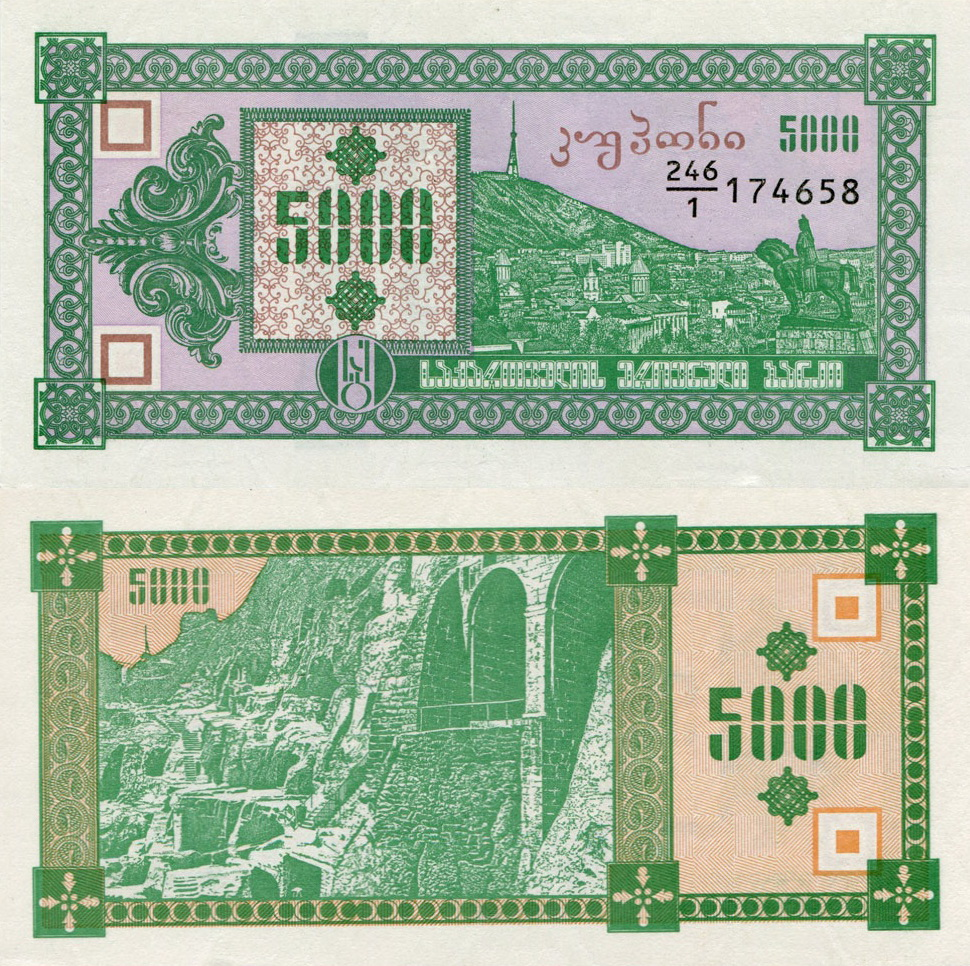
5,000 kuponi

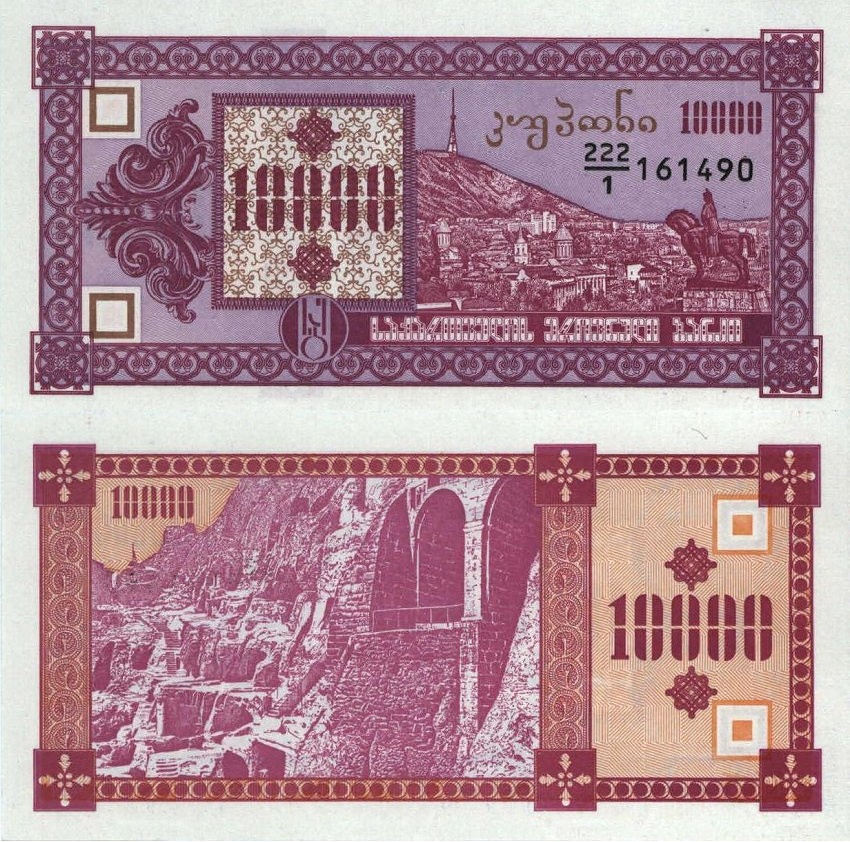
10,000 kuponi

=== Second 1993 series ===
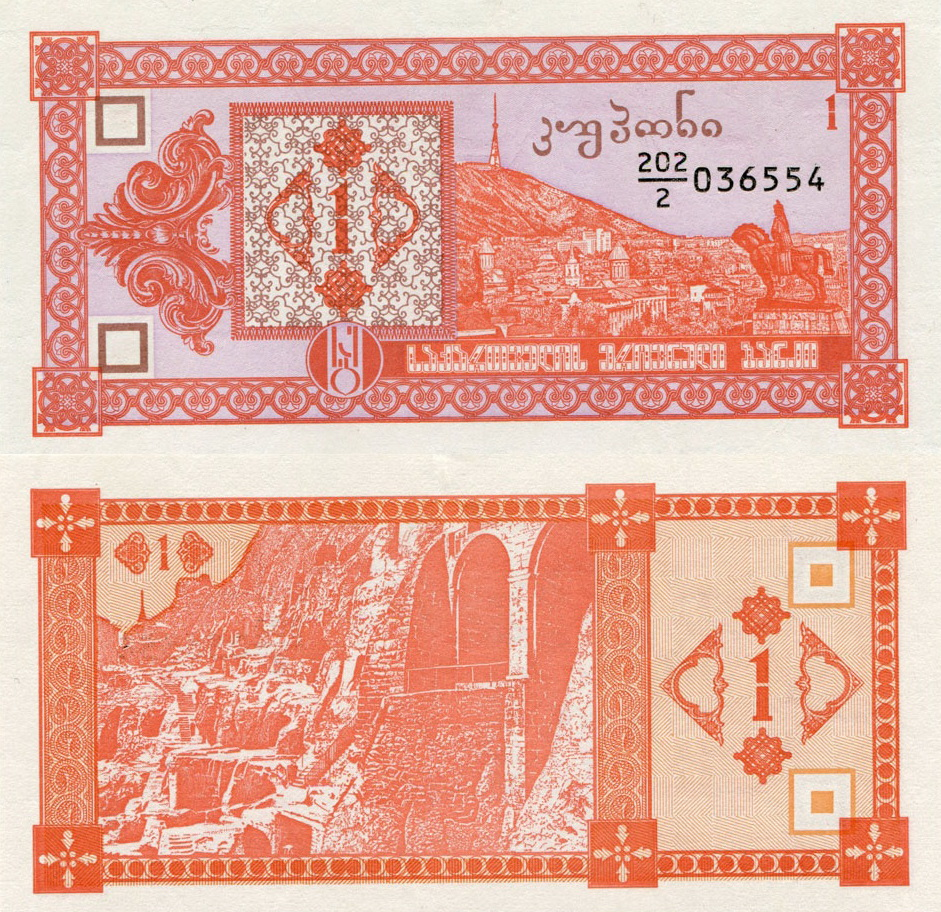
1 kuponi

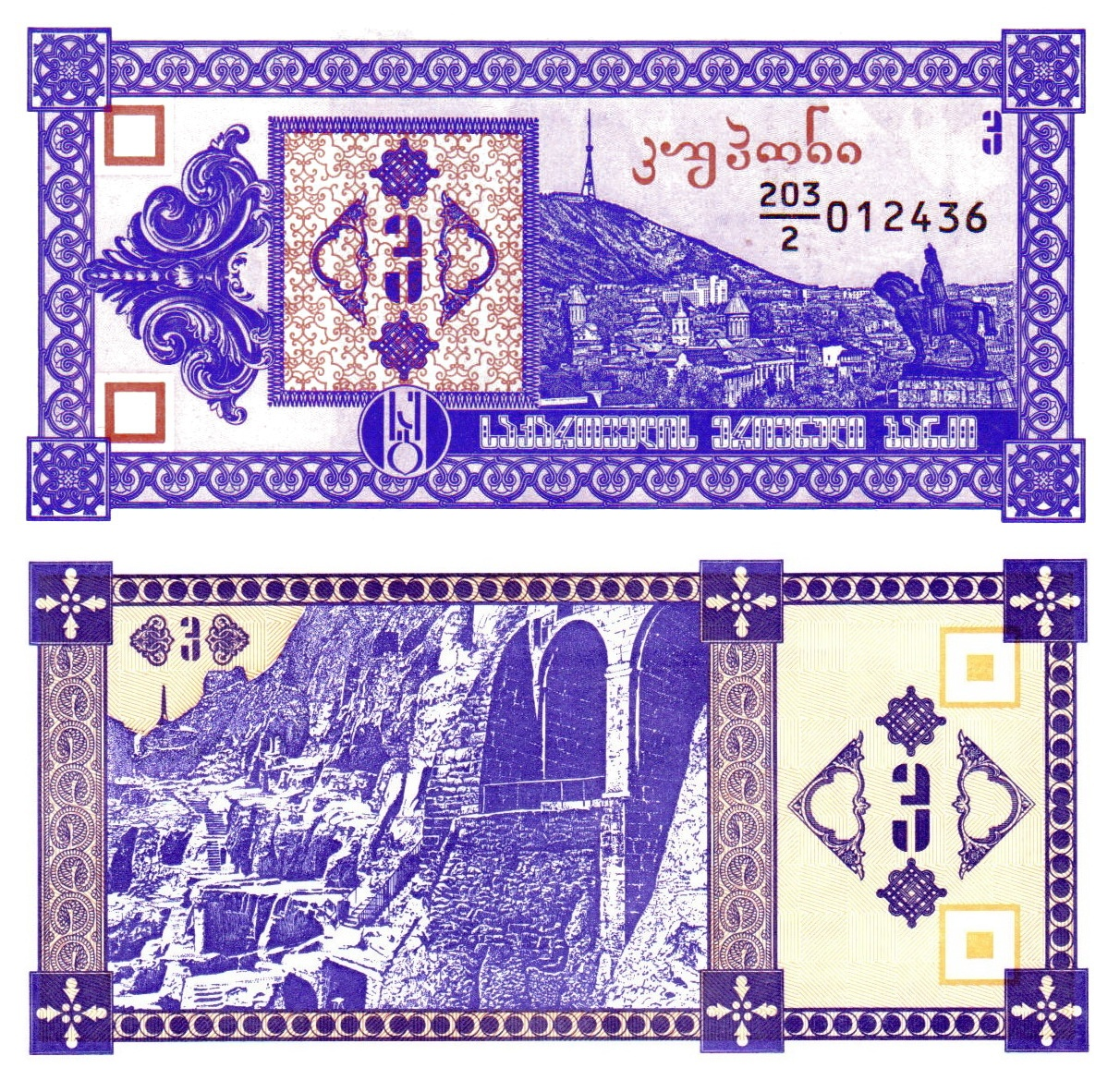
3 kuponi

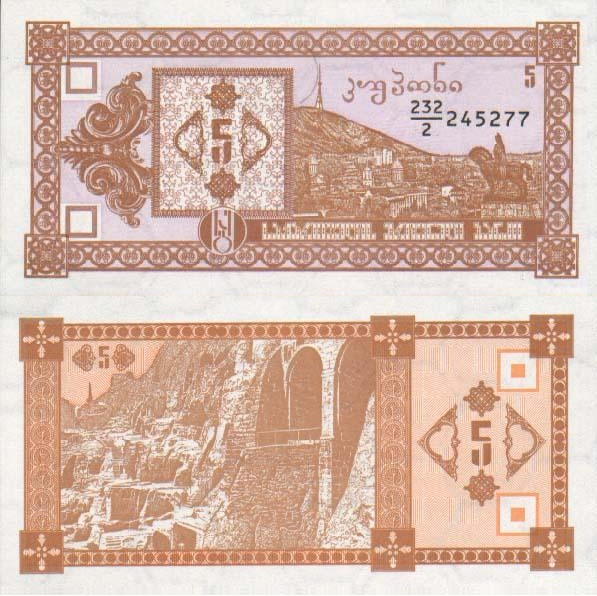
5 kuponi

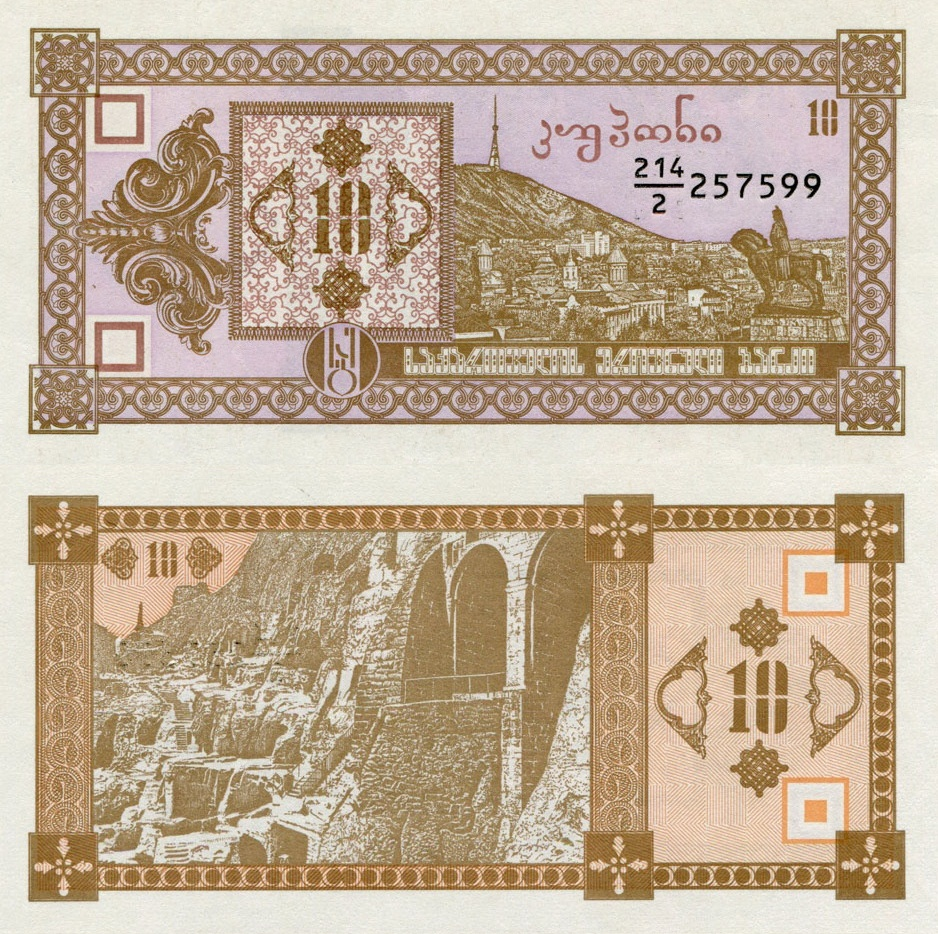
10 kuponi

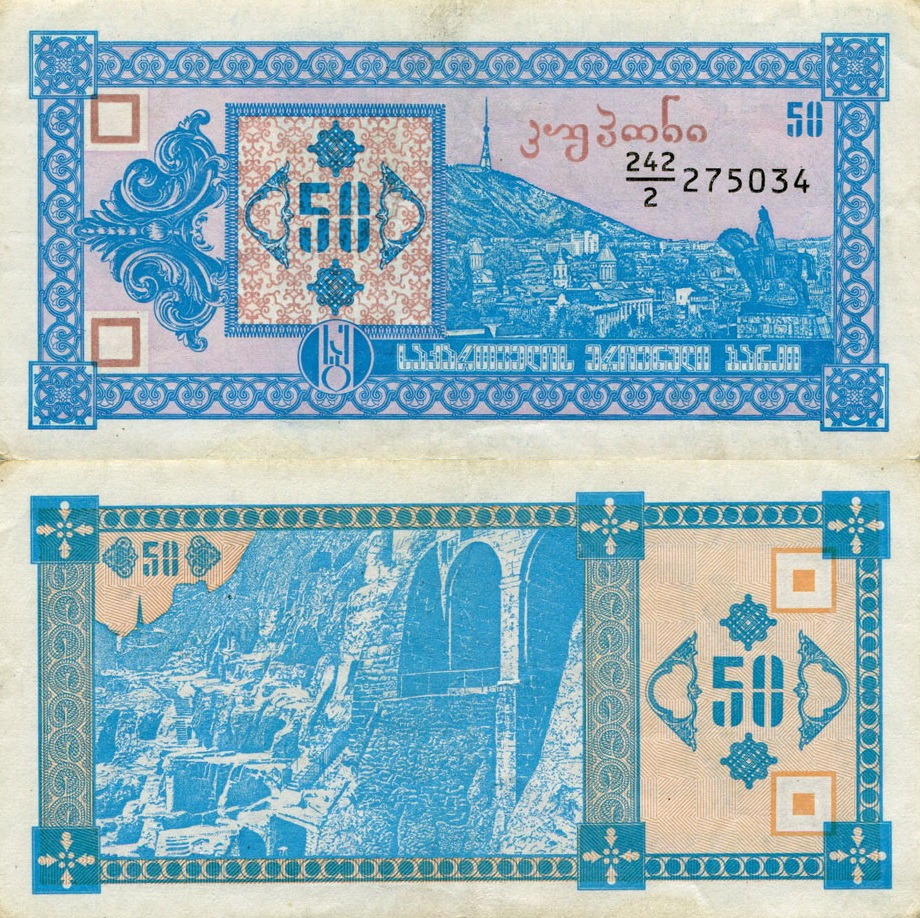
50 kuponi

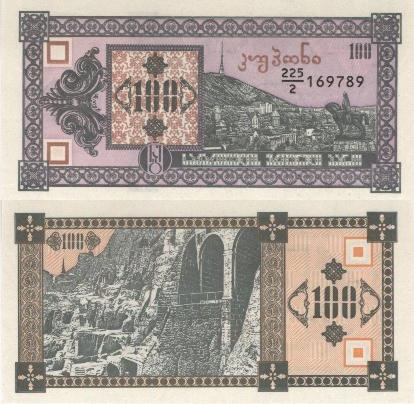
100 kuponi

=== Third 1993 series ===
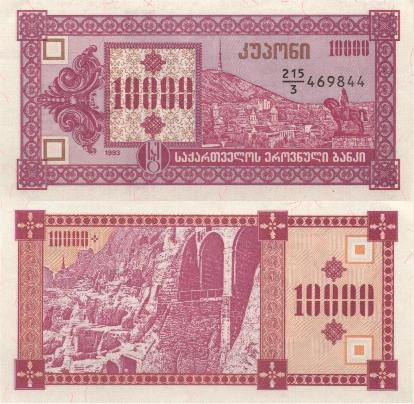
10,000 kuponi

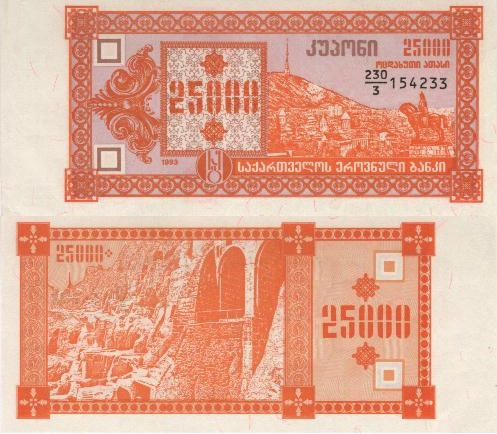
25,000 kuponi

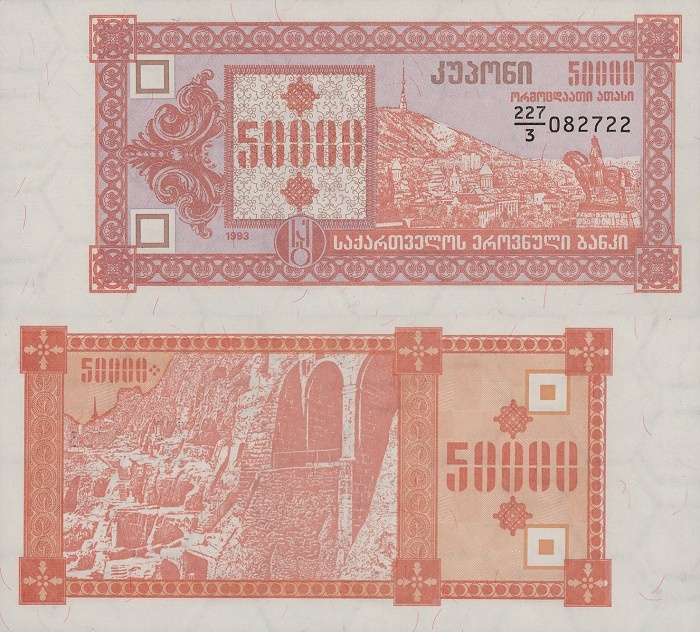
50,000 kuponi

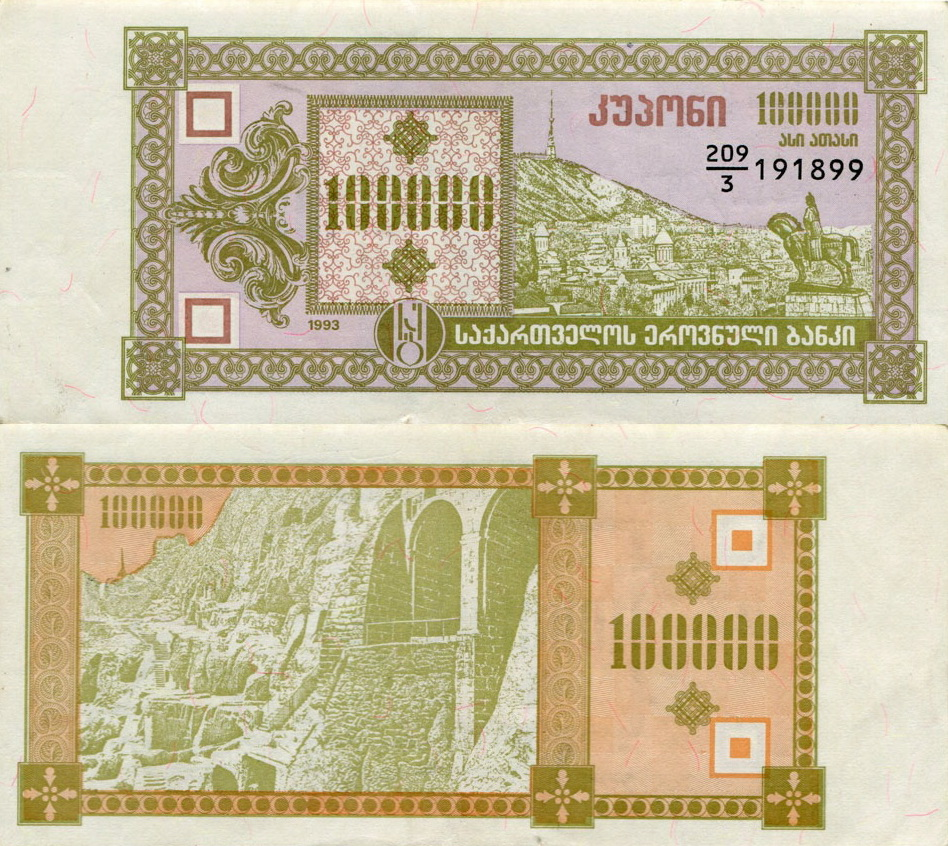
100,000 kuponi

=== Fourth 1993 series ===
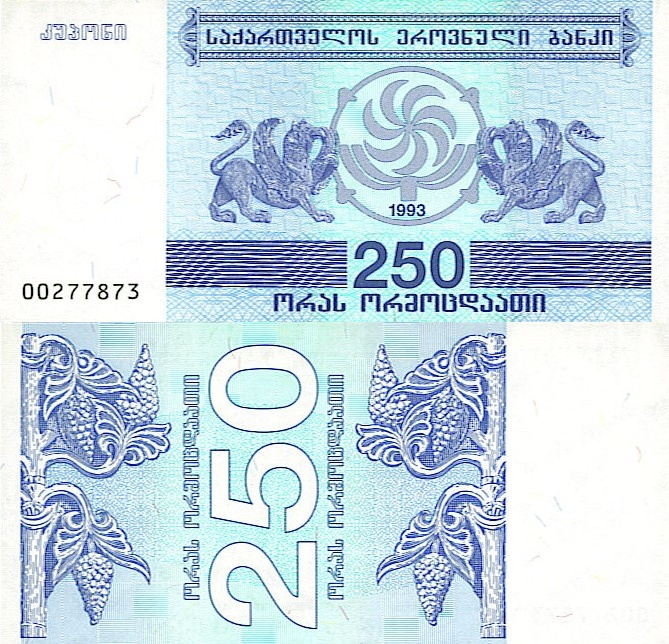
250 kuponi

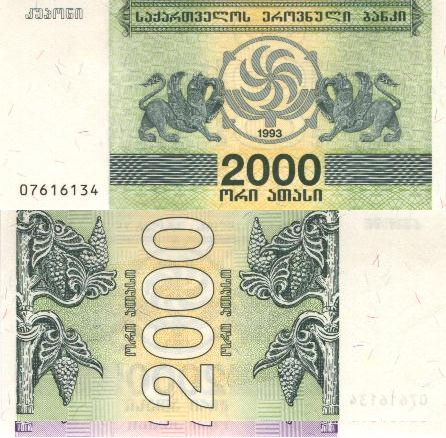
2,000 kuponi

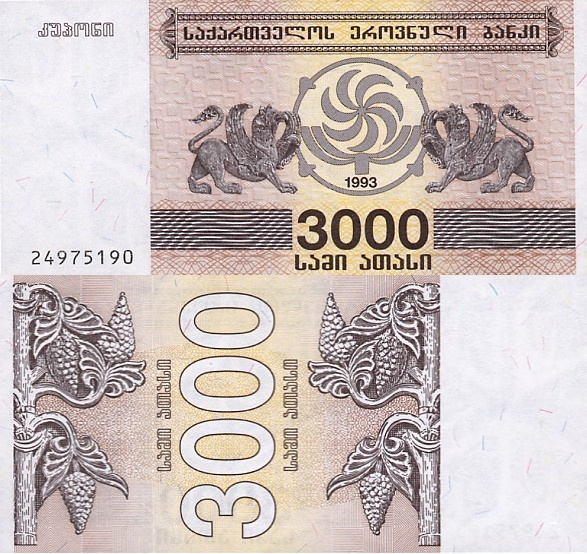
3,000 kuponi

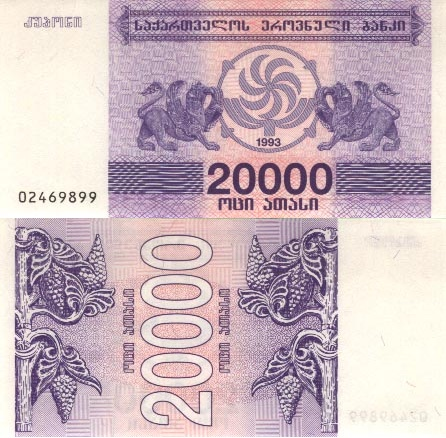
20,000 kuponi

=== 1994 series ===
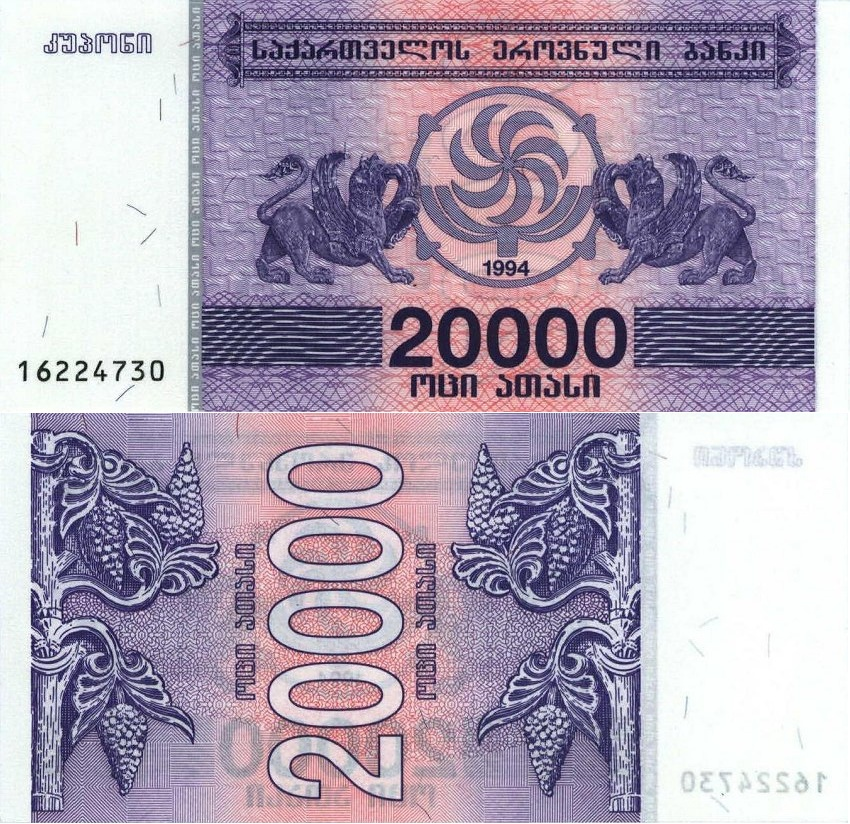
20,000 kuponi

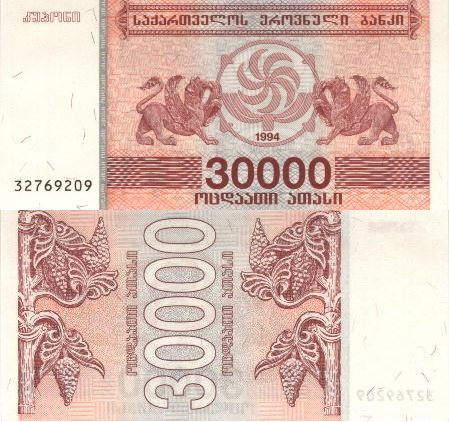
30,000 kuponi

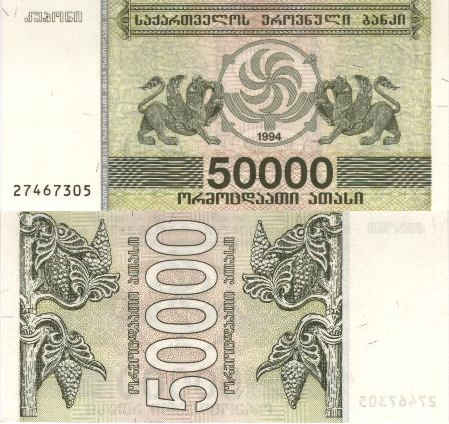
50,000 kuponi

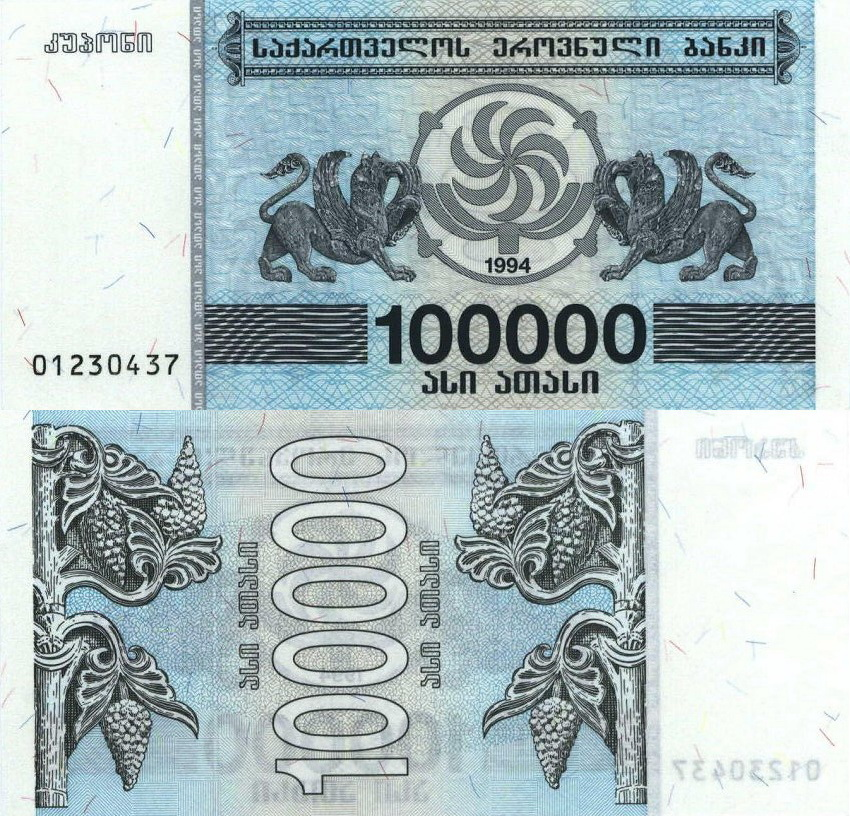
100,000 kuponi

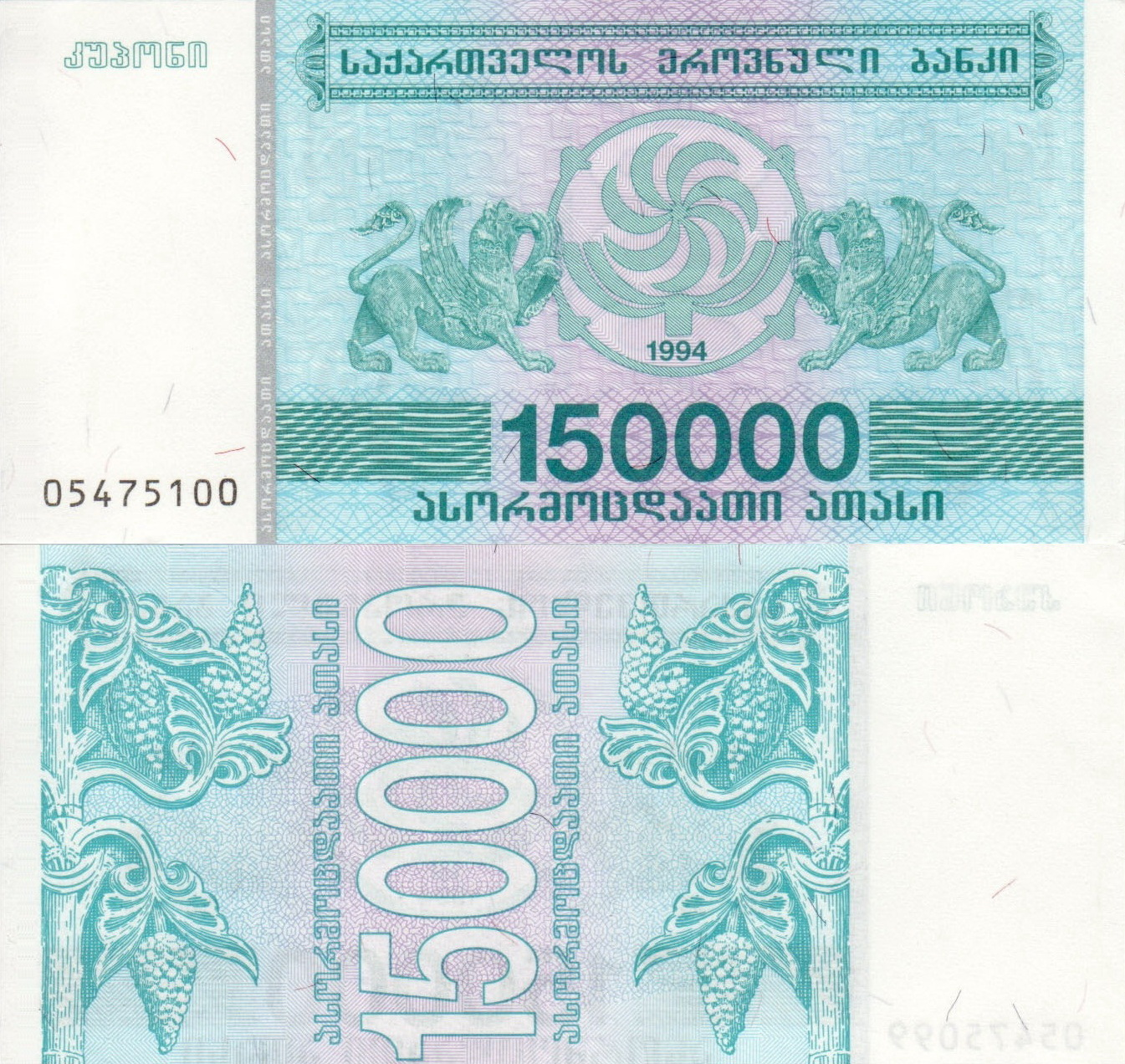
150,000 kuponi

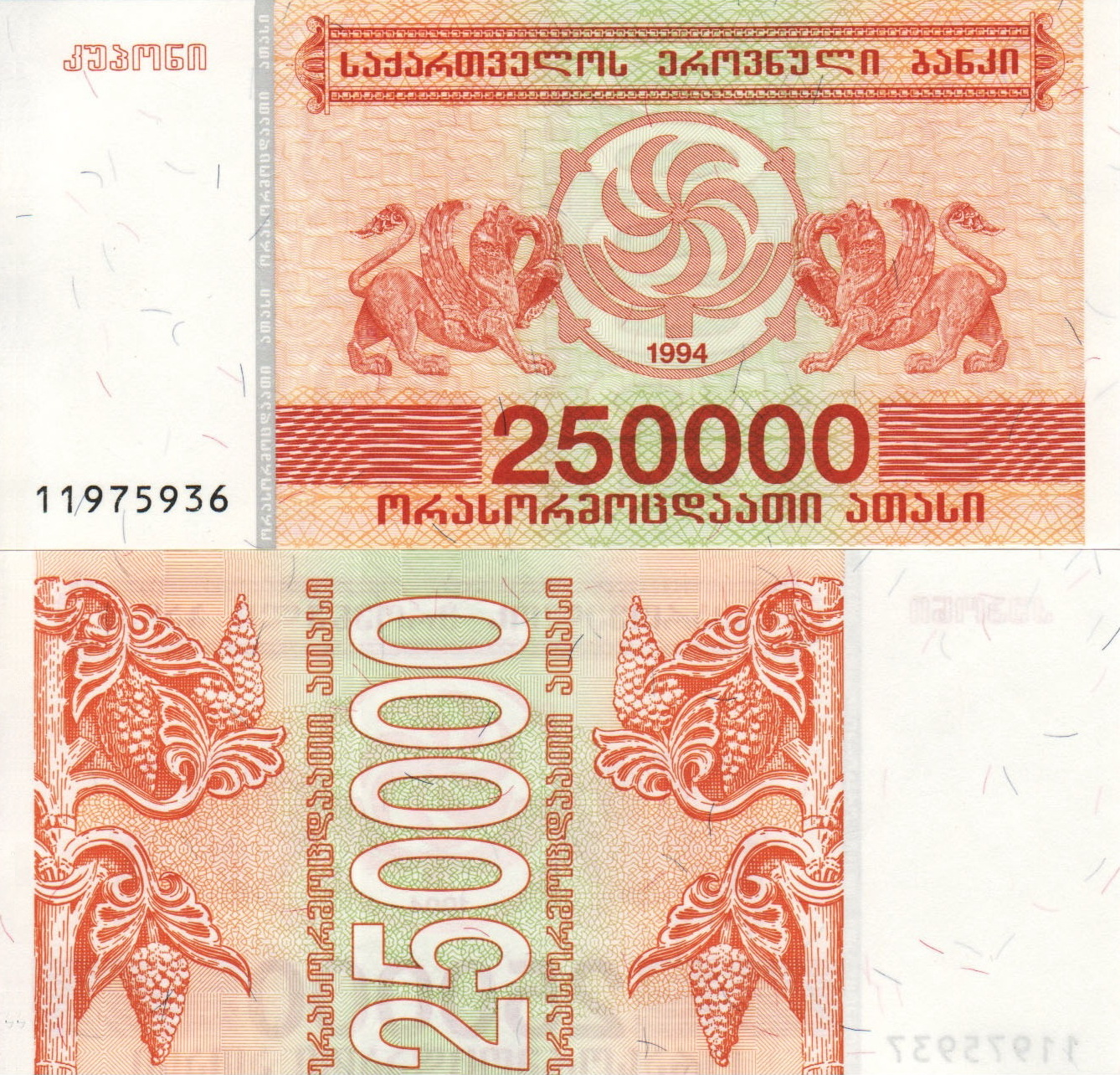
250,000 kuponi

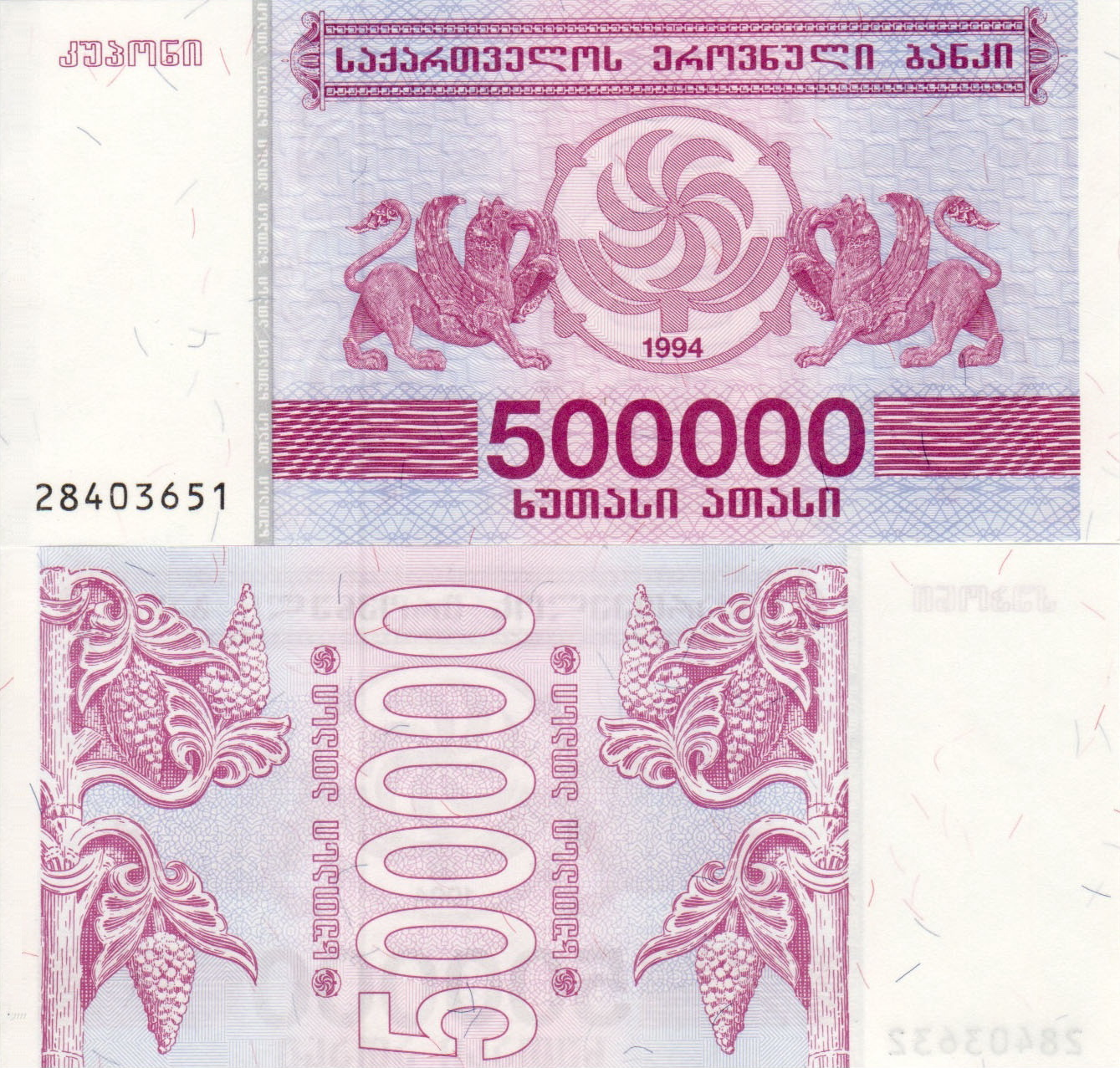
500,000 kuponi

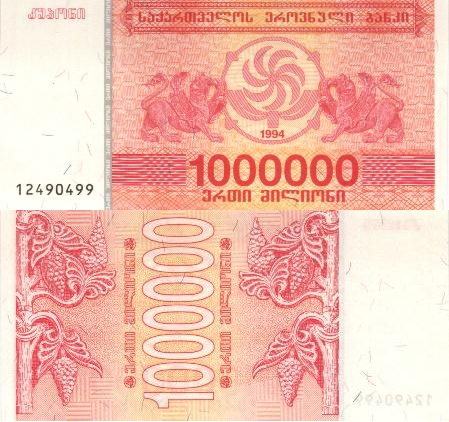
1,000,000 kuponi

== Abandonment ==
On 2 October 1995, the government of Eduard Shevardnadze replaced the provisional coupon currency with the lari, at a rate of one million to one. It has remained fairly stable since then.

Georgian kuponi
Preceded by: Russian rouble Reason: introduction of temporary currency Ratio: 1 kuponi = 1 rouble	Currency of Georgia; 5 April 1993 – 2 October 1995	Succeeded by: Georgian lari Reason: hyperinflation Ratio: 1 lari = 1,000,000 kuponi
