= American City University =

American City University (ACU) is a private unaccredited distance education university headquartered in Pasadena, California. The school currently offers an online MBA program.

ACU is affiliated with a corporation called International Management Association, headquartered in Hong Kong. Honolulu University is another affiliate of the International Management Association, which also formerly identified an affiliation with the American Central University, which was based in Laramie, Wyoming.

ACU in Los Angeles was incorporated in 2008 in Huntsville, Alabama, and relocated to California in 2009. It is licensed by the State of California but is not accredited by any recognized accreditation body.

== History ==
Formerly, American City University was the name of an institution that operated in Wyoming, where it was one of a dozen unaccredited offerors of higher education by distance learning that operated under a permissive state higher education law and were suspected of being diploma mills. In 2005, ACU was reported to be operating out of office space in the Tivoli Building, a Victorian building in downtown Cheyenne, Wyoming. ACU operated in 14 other locations worldwide, including sites in London; Limerick and Cork, Ireland; Kyiv; Macedonia; Dubai; Beirut; Athens; Sri Lanka; Taiwan; the Philippines; and Malaysia. ACU reported in 2005 that 300 students were enrolled worldwide. The school is alleged to have marketed an MBA program in Vietnam that did not deliver the promised value to the students it enrolled. After Wyoming enacted a law requiring higher education institutions in the state to be accredited or in the process of obtaining accreditation by July 1, 2006, several unaccredited schools closed down or left the state. ACU sought accreditation from the Distance Education and Training Council. As of June 2009, however, the Wyoming Department of Education listed ACU as "no longer licensed or registered ... to operate as [a] private post-secondary degree granting education institution."

== Memberships ==
ACU became a member of the California Association of Private Postsecondary Schools (CAPPS) in May 2009. CAPPS is a California association representing private postsecondary schools in California. It is a professional organization, rather than an accreditation association.

== Academic programs ==
ACU offers an MBA degree (Masters in Business Administration).

== See also ==
- Newport International University
- Preston University (United States)
- Rutherford University
- Warren National University
- List of unaccredited institutions of higher learning
