= American Central University =

For-profit distance learning university

American Central University (ACU) was an unaccredited distance learning private, for-profit university licensed by the state of Wyoming in 2004. The Oregon Office of Degree Authorization stated that the institution may be run from Malaysia.

== Controversy ==
According to the Associated Press, "For not having even one qualified instructor in Wyoming, the (Wyoming Board of Education) prepared last fall [2004] to pull the school's license—only to have the process bog down while state attorneys deliberate how to do that."

American Central University was investigated for offering students false degrees from state universities through their online courses.

The Associated Press noted, "Wyoming licensed a Laramie-based online school last year even as its owner helped direct a Hawaii online school that was offering illegal medical degrees and was later shut down by a judge." The article further explained, "The owner of American Central University, Adalat Khan, was the Malaysian regional director for American University of Hawaii, a fact that Wyoming education officials concede they overlooked in the documents Khan provided on his background."

In July 2006 Wyoming passed a law requiring all schools to either have accreditation or be a candidate for it. ACU applied for accreditation one day prior to the deadline, July 1, 2006, after which the law gives schools five years to get the accreditation.

== Affiliations ==
American Central University claimed to be affiliated with the Mina Resource/Mina Management Institute in Malaysia. Adalat Khan was the director/president of the Mina Management Institute.

It has been reported that "Khan runs a school in Perak, Malaysia, called the Mina Management Institute. For a time, American Central and American University of Hawaii were listed next to each other on the Mina Management Institute Web site as "distinguished partners" of the institute." Adalat Khan's doctorate was bestowed in 1999 by the now defunct American University of Hawaii.

The Oregon Office of Degree Authorization at one time said that "A web site called International DETC that recently emerged as part of an unaccredited entity called American Central University, is a fraudulent attempt to hijack the genuine DETC name and school list in order to advance the goals of a diploma mill. The diploma mill is probably operating out of Wyoming and/or Malaysia."

== Accreditation status ==
ACU was not accredited by any organization recognized by the Council for Higher Education Accreditation or the United States Department of Education. The use of unaccredited degree titles may be legally restricted or illegal in some jurisdictions. Jurisdictions that have restricted or made illegal the use of credentials from unaccredited schools include Oregon, Michigan, Maine, North Dakota, New Jersey, Washington, Nevada, Illinois, Indiana, Texas and Korea. Many other states are also considering restrictions on the use of degrees from unaccredited institutions.

== See also ==
- American City University
- Newport International University
- Preston University (United States)
- Rutherford University
- Warren National University
- List of unaccredited institutions of higher education
