= Galt & Taggart =

Investment bank and asset management firm in Georgia

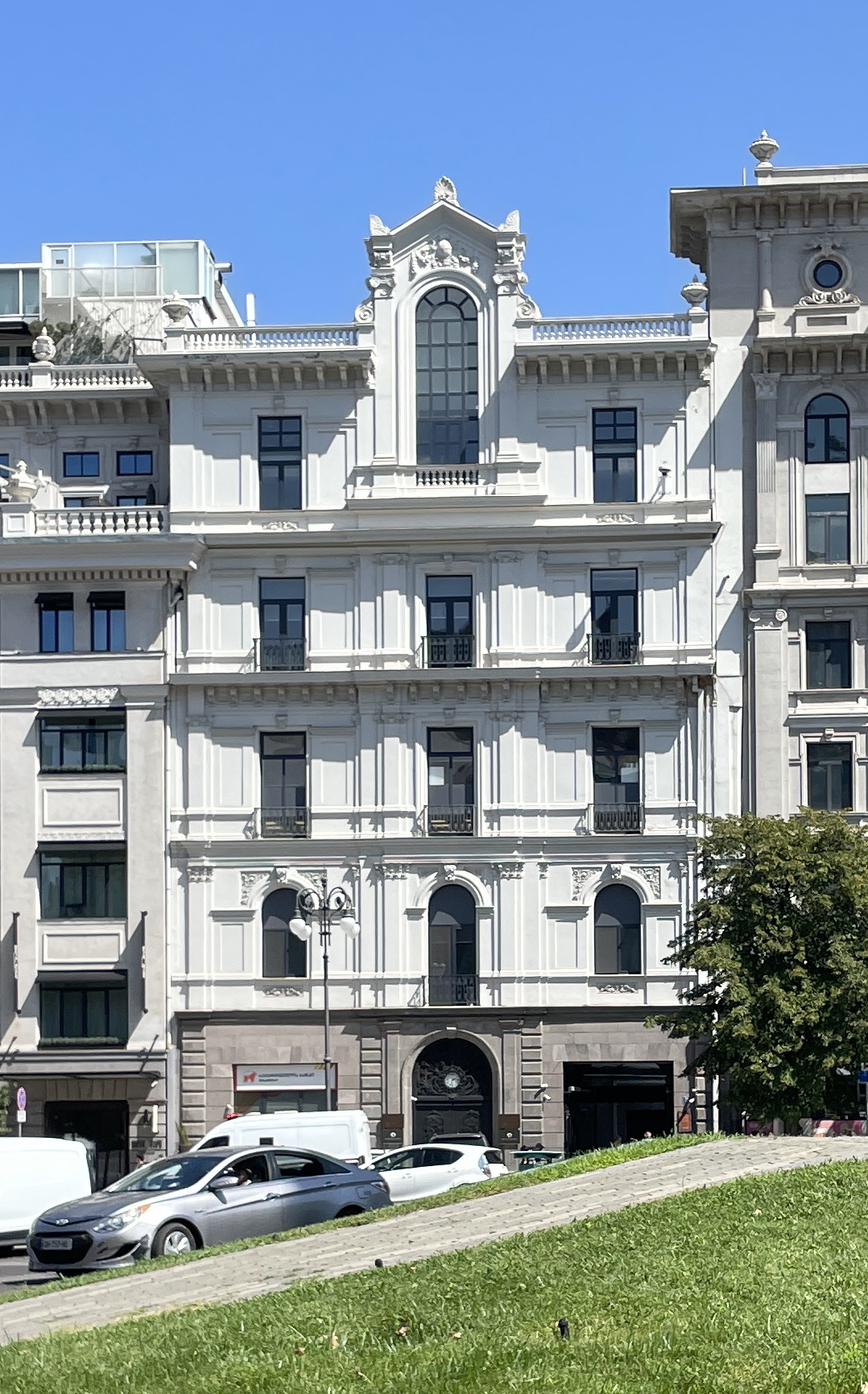
- Galt & Taggart and Bank of Georgia Wealth Management HQ. Freedom Square, Tbilisi
- Native name: გალტ ენდ თაგარტი
- Formerly: BG Capital (2009-2014); Galt & Taggart Securities (2000-2009)
- Type: Wholly owned Joint-stock company
- Industry: Banking, Financial services, Research
- Founded: 1995
- Headquarters: Tbilisi, Georgia
- Key people: Giorgi Kuprashvili, Director general
- Products: Brokerage; Financial Advisory; Capital Markets
- Parent: Bank of Georgia Group (through several companies)
- Website: galtandtaggart.com/en

Galt & Taggart (Note: From 2000 to 2009 the company was known as Galt & Taggart Securities and from 2009 to 2014 the name of the company was BG Capital) is an investment banking arm of Lion Finance Group, a financial services holding company listed on the London Stock Exchange (LSE: BGEO). The company offers investment banking services, including brokerage, financial advisory, capital markets and in-house research.

Over its 25 years of operations, Galt & Taggart has been recognized as Georgia’s leading investment bank, including most recently named by Euromoney as Best Investment Bank in Georgia in 2024 and Best Securities House in Georgia in 2024.

Galt & Taggart is a subsidiary of the Lion Finance Group plc, a UK incorporated Georgian financial services holding company, which is listed on the London Stock Exchange and is a constituent of the FTSE 100 Index.

== History ==
Galt & Taggart was founded on 12 December 1995 under the name of LLC Invest Expert. The company's primary activities included securities trading and financial consultancy services. In January 1999, it registered as a securities brokerage firm and obtained a brokerage license from the National Bank of Georgia.

In December 2000, the company was restructured and the name was changed to LLC Galt & Taggart Securities, after the names of the characters from Ayn Rand's novel Atlas Shrugged — John Galt and Dagny Taggart.

From 2000 to 2005, the company's shareholders included several investment banking and finance professionals with international experience in the relevant field. At the end of 2003, Bank of Georgia Group acquired a 35% stake in the company, while it became its 100% shareholder in September 2005.

Between 2006 and 2007, Galt & Taggart established regional representative offices. However, both regional offices were closed in 2008 due to the 2008 financial crisis.

In September 2009, Galt & Taggart changed its name to JSC BG Capital. In August 2014, the company underwent a rebranding and returned to its original name of JSC Galt & Taggart.

In February 2012, Galt & Taggart participated in the restructuring of Bank of Georgia Group, which included exchange of Bank of Georgia’s GDRs and Georgian locally listed common shares into London Stock Exchange common shares (Ticker: BGEO).

In November 2015, Galt & Taggart introduced first online trading platform in Georgia, “G&T Trader”, via white-label partnership with Saxo Bank.

In December 2021, in collaboration with DriveWealth and Bank of Georgia, Galt & Taggart introduced BOG Investments – Bank of Georgia’s mobile application based trading platform focused on mass retail and affluent clients.

== Business Areas ==
=== Investment Banking ===
Galt & Taggart’s investment banking division offers Financial Advisory and Capital Markets services, assisting individuals and companies in raising capital and providing financial consultancy.

Financial Advisory

Galt & Taggart’s Financial Advisory direction specializes in providing tailored financial and strategic consulting services to support businesses in achieving their financial goals, and focuses on three main service areas: Merger & Acquisition (M&A) Advisory, Company Valuation and Strategic Advisory. The Company closely collaborates with international financial institutions and donors on various development projects and has an extensive track record of working with EBRD, World Bank, USAID and EU.

Capital Markets

In 2014, Galt & Taggart placed an inaugural bond placement on the Georgian market. Since then, the Company has placed transactions in a total amount of over GEL 12.8 billion (USD 4.7 billion equivalent). Galt & Taggart has established itself as a market leader, participating in over 67% of all public local market placements and in 78% of all public foreign currency denominated local market placements in Georgia.

In 2023, Galt & Taggart collaborated with the National Bank of Georgia to develop Multi-Currency Bond Program. The Company has been the pioneer in introducing ESG labelled securities on the local market – arranging the first ever Green, Sustainability-Linked, Gender and Sustainability bonds in Georgia since 2023.

=== Brokerage ===
Galt & Taggart Brokerage is the leading brokerage house in Georgia. It provides brokerage services to clients for local, regional and international capital markets and serves resident, non-resident, individual and legal entity clients, offering them variety of investment products based on their preferences.

In 2015, in partnership with Saxo bank, Galt & Taggart was the first brokerage house in Georgia which offered multi-asset trading platform and in 2021, in partnership with DriveWealth, it was the first brokerage house in Georgia which offered mass retail Investment platform in local language, embedded in Bank of Georgia mobile application and named as BoG Investments.

=== Research ===
Galt & Taggart Research helps investors better understand the issues and trends that affect companies, industries, and markets, while providing fundamental insights and analysis in these areas.

Galt & Taggart Research offers the two main services: Public Research and Custom Research. The Company publishes weekly, monthly and quarterly insights and analyses on global and local macroeconomic developments, and sector-specific reports. Its research products are available on major proprietary platforms, such as: Bloomberg, Thomson Reuters, S&P Capital IQ, FactSet, and Tellimer.

=== Awards and recognition ===
Galt & Taggart has received numerous awards. Multiple organizations have repeatedly recognized it as the best investment bank in Georgia.
