= Giorgi Kadagidze =

Georgian banker

Governor of the National Bank of Georgia
- In office February 26, 2009 – February 2016
- Preceded by: David Amaglobeli
- Succeeded by: Koba Gvenetadze

Personal details
- Born: 10 April 1980 (age 46)
- Children: 2
- Education: Preston University

Giorgi Kadagidze (Georgian: გიორგი ქადაგიძე) (born 10 April 1980) is a Georgian banker.

In 2001 he graduated from the Tbilisi-located European School of Management (ESM). He also received a BA at Preston University. In 2005 he earned MA from the Georgian Institute of Public Affairs. From February 2009 to February 2016 Kadagidze was the chairman and governor of the board of the National Bank of Georgia.
