= Didube =

Didube may refer to:

- Didube Pantheon, a cemetery in Tbilisi, Georgia
- Didube (Tbilisi Metro), a metro station in Tbilisi, Georgia
- Didube-Chugureti District, an administrative district (raioni) in Tbilisi, Georgia
