= Lion Finance Group =

UK incorporated Georgian Financial services holding company

Lion Finance Group PLC

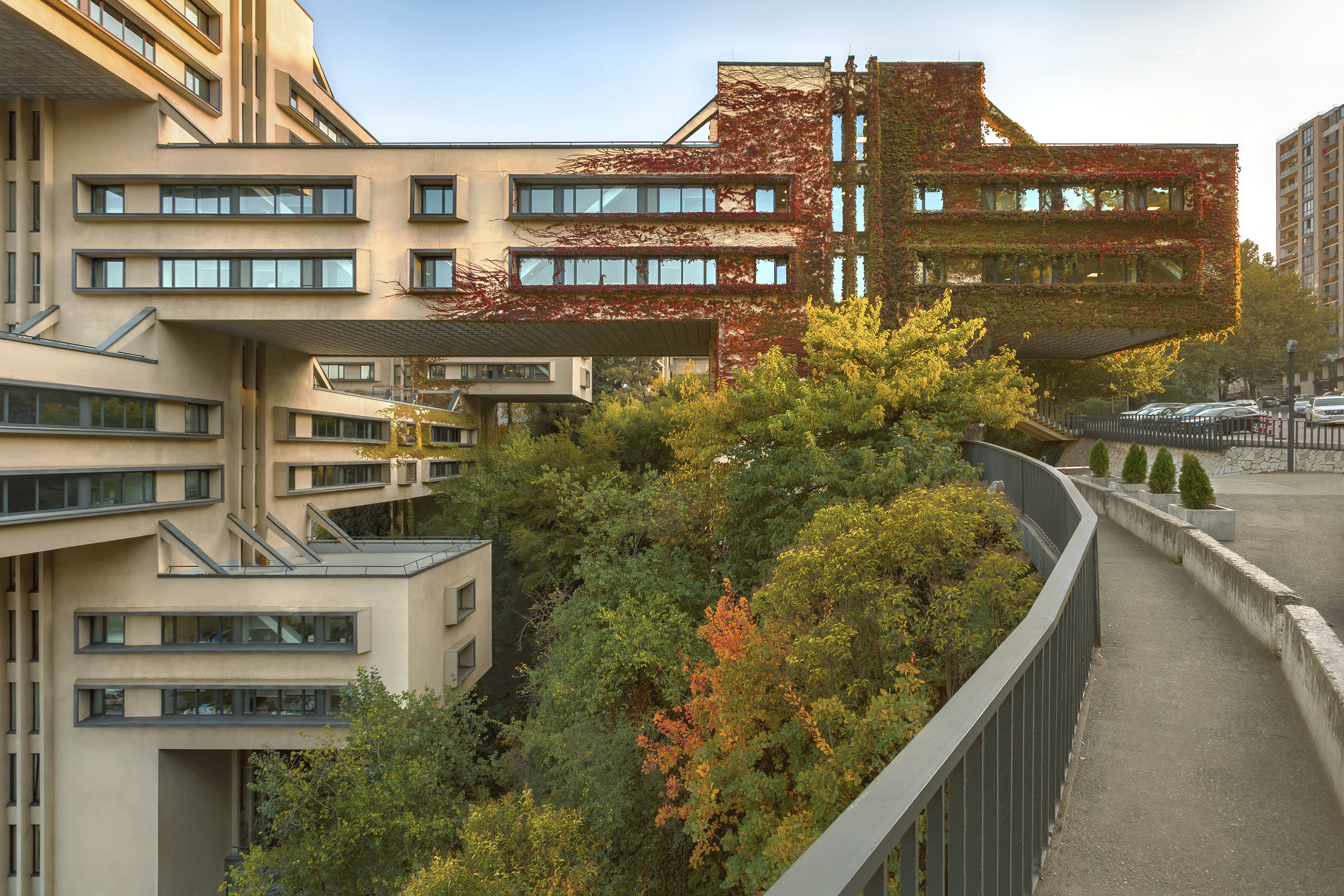
- Head office of Bank of Georgia in Tbilisi, Georgia.
- Company type: Public limited company
- Traded as: LSE: BGEO; FTSE 100 component
- Industry: Banking; Financial services
- Headquarters: Tbilisi, Georgia
- Area served: Georgia; Armenia
- Key people: Mel Carvill (Non-Executive Chairman); Archil Gachechiladze (CEO)
- Products: Retail banking Corporate Banking; Trade Finance; Wealth Management investment management SME finance
- Revenue: ▲GEL4,303.3 million (2025)
- Operating income: ▼GEL2,580.5 million (2025)
- Net income: ▼GEL2,163.2 million (2025)
- Total assets: ▲GEL60,869.9 million (2025)
- Total equity: ▲GEL8,422.2 million (2025)
- Subsidiaries: Bank of Georgia; Belarusky Narodny Bank: Ameriabank; Galt and Taggart
- Website: lionfinancegroup.uk

Lion Finance Group PLC (Note: formerly Bank of Georgia Group) (LSE: BGEO) is a UK incorporated, financial services holding company with its registered office in London, England, and its corporate headquarters in Tbilisi, Georgia.

Lion Finance Group's main subsidiaries provide banking and financial services through leading, customer-centric, universal banks – Bank of Georgia in Georgia and Ameriabank in Armenia. The group's subsidiaries also include investment bank Galt & Taggart, Belarusian bank Belarusky Narodny Bank and other small companies in banking, payment and non-banking sectors.

Lion Finance Group is listed on the premium segment of the main market of the London Stock Exchange and is a constituent of the FTSE 100 Index.

== History ==
On October 14, 2011, Bank of Georgia Holdings PLC was incorporated in the UK to allow Bank of Georgia and its related companies to secure a listing on the London Stock Exchange. On February 28, 2012, this went ahead and Bank of Georgia Holdings's shares were duly admitted to the London Stock Exchange.

In August 2015, the business underwent a restructuring to separate the banking and investment businesses under a new holding company. On November 20, 2015, Bank of Georgia Holdings changed its name to BGEO Group.

In August 2018, it was decided to separate the banking and investment businesses. Two separate companies, Bank of Georgia plc and Georgia Capital plc were incorporated in the UK. Each BGEO Group Shareholder received one Georgia Capital Share and one Bank of Georgia Group share. The investment business was transferred to Georgia Capital plc, which was demerged and listed on the London Stock Exchange on May 28, 2018.

In February 2024, Bank of Georgia Group announced the proposed acquisition of 100% of a leading bank in Armenia, Ameriabank, for approximately $303.6 million. The acquisition completed on May 24, 2024.

On February 6, 2025 Bank of Georgia Group plc changed its name to Lion Finance Group plc.

== Shareholders ==
As at 31 March 2022, the Group's top ten shareholders were JSC Georgia Capital (19.90%), Harding Loevner LP (4.30%), Fidelity Investments (3.70%), Van Eck Associates Corporation (3.50%), M&G Investment Management Ltd (3.40%), Dimensional Fund Advisors (DFA) LP (3.40%), Vanguard Group Inc (2.50%), GLG Partners LP (2.40%), Tiger Management LLC (2.10%), Standard Life Investments (2.10%).
