= Mohammad Reza Hafezi =

Iranian physician and philanthropist

- محمدرضا حافظی
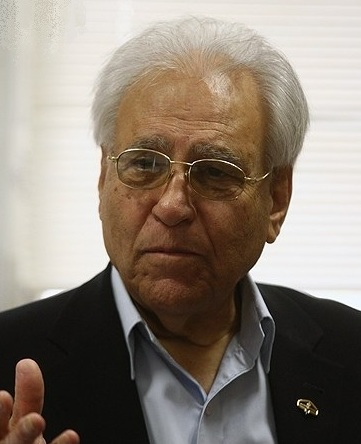
- Born: 30 May 1928; Borujerd
- Died: 11 June 2019 (aged 91); Tehran
- Education: Newport International University
- Occupation: Iranian architect And philanthropist
- Known for: The father of Iranian school building
- Notable work: chairman of the Iranian School Building Association

Mohammad Reza Hafezi (born 30 May 1928 – died 11 June 2019) was a philanthropist and the founder and chairman of the Iranian School Building Association. he built more than 14 schools in Iran.

== Life ==
Mohammad Reza Hafezi was born on May 30, 1928 in Borujerd. His father, Mostafa Hafezi, was one of the founders of the electricity industry and flour factory in Borujerd. He received his doctorate in management from Newport International University. he was elected chairman of the Iranian School Building Association and the father of school building in the country in 1998, and served in this position for about 20 years.

== Memorial Ceremony ==
On Monday, June 10, 2019, the day before Hafezi's death, the Ministry of Education held a memorial ceremony for him, attended by a group of officials and school-building benefactors.

== Death ==
He died on Tuesday, June 11, 2019. The Leader of the Islamic Republic of Iran, Seyyed Ali Khamenei, sent a message of condolences to Hafezi's family. he is remembered as a philanthropist and the father of school building and the founder of the Iranian School Building Association.
