= Preston University =

University of Preston or Preston University can refer to the following institutions:

- Preston University (Pakistan), a private university in Pakistan
- Preston University (United States), a defunct unaccredited private university in the United States
- University of Lancashire, a public university based in Preston, England
