= Irakli Mekvabishvili =

Irakli Mekvabishvili ირაკლი მექვაბიშვილი

Auditor General of Georgia
- Incumbent
- Assumed office September 24, 2017

Personal details
- Born: 11 May 1973 (age 53) Tbilisi
- Education: Tbilisi State University

Irakli Mekvabishvili (Georgian: ირაკლი მექვაბიშვილი; born May 11, 1973) is a Georgian banker and economist, who has served as Auditor General of Georgia from September 2017 to September 2022.

== Working Experience ==
Worked at the European Bank for Reconstruction and Development at various positions:

- 2015–2017 — Associated Director, Senior Banker, Business Leader in Georgia and Azerbaijan, Department of Financial Institutions, North Africa and the Caucasus Region;
- 2007–2015 — Senior Banker, Department of Financial Institutions in the Caucasus, Central Asian and Mongolian Regions, Business Coordinator in Georgia;

2008–2014 was Member of Supervisory Board — TBC Leasing, Georgia;

2005–2007 was Deputy Director General and Director General at VTB Bank Georgia; 1998-2003 worked JSC United Georgian Bank at various positions, including Director General; 1996–1998 was Senior Economist at Banking’ Supervision Department at the National Bank of Georgia; In 1997 was Bank Auditor at the Banking Supervision Department of the Federal Reserve Bank of Minneapolis (Minnesota, USA); 1996-1996 was Chief Economist at the Commercial Bank "Krtsanisi" Treasury Operations Department.

== Education ==
1991–1996 — Tbilisi State University, Faculty of Economy, Banking. (2006) Degree of Doctor of Economics (Subject: Ways to Improve Banking Supervision System on Modern Stages).

Besides native Georgian, speaks English and Russian languages.
