= Chakhava =

Chakhava is a surname. Notable people with the surname include:

- George Chakhava (1923–2007), Georgian architect
- Medea Chakhava (1921–2009), Georgian actress
