= Roman Gotsiridze =

Georgian economist and politician

Member of the Parliament of Georgia
- In office 18 November 2016 – 25 November 2024
- In office 22 April 2004 – 22 March 2005
- In office 4 November 1992 – 3 December 1992
- In office 14 November 1990 – 2 January 1992
- Constituency: Didube

Chairman of the UNM Faction in Parliament
- In office 20 January 2017 – 11 December 2020
- Preceded by: Nika Melia
- Succeeded by: Khatia Dekanoidze

President of the National Bank of Georgia
- In office 22 March 2005 – 30 September 2007
- President: Mikheil Saakashvili
- Preceded by: Irakli Managadze
- Succeeded by: David Amaglobeli

Deputy Prime Minister
- In office 3 December 1992 – 6 August 1993
- Prime Minister: Tengiz Sigua

Personal details
- Born: December 16, 1955 (age 70) Gali, Abkhaz ASSR, Soviet Union
- Party: Independent (2023-); United National Movement (2005-2023); Republican Party (2004-2005); People's Front (1990-1993)
- Education: Tbilisi State University
- Occupation: Economist

Roman Gotsiridze (Georgian: რომან გოცირიძე; born on December 16, 1955) is a Georgian economist and politician. He served as a member of Parliament in 1990–1992, 1992, 2004–2005, and 2016–2024, as well as Deputy Prime Minister in 1992–1993 and President of the National Bank of Georgia in 2005–2007.

One of Georgia's longest-standing politicians, Roman Gotsiridze first joined the country's Supreme Council during the first post-Soviet elections of 1990, being elected as Representative of the Didube District as a member of People's Front, and was a signatory of the April 1991 declaration of independence. After the government's overthrow in 1992, he was appointed Deputy Prime Minister in the cabinet of Tengiz Sigua and was put in charge of the government's economic portfolio. His term was marked by an economic collapse caused by the fall of the USSR and the Georgian Civil War and Gotsiridze secured Georgia's first international loans and rolled out the kuponi, the first national currency.

In opposition to the presidency of Eduard Shevardnadze, he joined the Republican Party and was elected to Parliament in 2004 after the Rose Revolution. A year later, he was appointed as President of the National Bank of Georgia, focusing his term on increasing foreign currency reserves, increasing international banking presence in Georgia, fighting off the growing Russian financial presence in Abkhazia, and curtailing inflation. His failure to keep the inflation rate below 10% has been attributed as a reason behind his resignation in 2005.

In 2016, Roman Gotsiridze returned to the political scene by being elected to the Parliament as a member of the United National Movement. When the party split following the creation of European Georgia, he became the leader of UNM's parliamentary faction, making him the highest-ranking opposition leader in the legislature. He oversaw his party's struggle against the Georgian Dream-led government, including in its response to the adoption of a new constitution in 2018, the 2019-2020 political crisis, and the COVID-19 pandemic. He was reelected to Parliament in 2020 but refused to accept his seat and boycotted the legislature until May 2021.

In February 2023, he left UNM and has since remained as an independent MP.

== Biography ==
=== Early life and education ===
Roman Gotsiridze was born on December 16, 1955, in Gali, a town in the then-Abkhaz ASSR. He was enrolled in 1974 for his compulsory military service in the Soviet Army and became an Industry Planning student at Tbilisi State University, from which he graduated in 1982. After graduating, he worked in the staff of TSU, before becoming a docent in the university's Department of Industry and Agricultural Economy in 1989. He is a Doctor of Economic Sciences.

Though joining the political sphere in 1990, Gotsiridze remained closely tied with the academic field and continued teaching at TSU until 1995. Since 2014, he has been a professor of economics at the International Black Sea University. He also briefly served as President of the Economic Freedom and Private Property League of Georgia, a free market NGO, as well as chairman of the Supervisory Board of the investment hedge fund Georgian Capital in 1995-1996.

=== Early political career ===
During the 1990 legislative election, Georgia's first multiparty and free election since 1919, Roman Gotsiridze co-founded the Democratic Center, an anti-Communist political organization. He ran for the Didube Majoritarian District, defeating the Communist Party nominee. A member of the Supreme Council, he was one of the signatories of the Act of Restoration of Independence of April 9, 1991, and sat in independent Georgia's first Parliament. During his term, he often found himself opposed to other MPs because of his free market positions, including supporting privatizations, while the nationalist government of Gamsakhurdia supported a more centralized, state-run economy. On January 2, 1992, the Supreme Council was abolished during the 1991-92 Georgian coup d'état by the Military Council of the Republic of Georgia, which overthrew Gamsakhurdia. Gotsiridze was a member of the State Council of the Republic of Georgia which governed Georgia for several months after Gamsakhurdia's overthrow.

In the October 1992 parliamentary election organized by the new government of Eduard Shevardnadze, Roman Gotsiridze was once again elected through the electoral list of the October 11 Bloc, an opposition coalition led by Nodar Natadze. At that time, he aligned himself with Shevardnadze as the latter was facing the rising influence of Tengiz Kitovani and Jaba Ioseliani, two warlords responsible for the 1991-92 coup. On December 3, he was appointed as deputy prime minister in the cabinet of Tengiz Sigua, in charge of the country's struggling economic portfolio. As such, he faced a difficult situation with Georgia in the midst of a civil war and a chaotic socio-economic situation following the collapse of the Soviet Union. Gotsiridze was notably in charge of overseeing the transfer of Soviet-era state-owned economic facilities to the Georgian government. He was a strong proponent of the price liberalization and privatizations and was regularly opposed by Avtandil Margiani, an influential fellow deputy prime minister in charge of supervising agricultural policy.

As Deputy Prime Minister, Roman Gotsiridze oversaw the creation of the kuponi, a temporary currency meant to replace the Russian ruble. Though the state had no existing foreign currency reserve, he secured a loan from the Dutch government to make the country's initial deposits for membership in the World Bank and the International Monetary Fund. He was also involved in negotiations with Russia over a settlement of the war in Abkhazia.

=== Head of the Parliamentary Budget Office ===
In 1998, Roman Gotsiridze was appointed Head of the Budget Office in Parliament by Speaker Zurab Zhvania. As such, he took a large role in writing the annual budget and his office served as a watchdog over the Ministry of Finance. He regularly criticized what he thought to be government waste, including the large budgets given to regulatory agencies. He was also opposed to the idea of creating a free trade zone in Adjara and regularly raised concerns about the Adjarian Autonomous Republic's lack of financial transfers to the central government. Often disagreeing with the government's own financial figures, he accused the Shevardnadze government of closing its eyes on a large network of tobacco smuggling that cost the Georgian state a large share of revenues.

Wary of Georgia's energy dependence on Russia, he was also reluctant to give credit to the Shevardnadze government for the South Caucasus Pipeline. He was critical of a 2002 bill that would have allowed the President to reschedule the debts of state-owned enterprises and called for drastic expenditure cuts to avoid IMF sanctions. He was also against a proposal by the government to audit civil society organizations and warned that American financial aid would be tied with democratic reforms.

Gotsiridze joined the National Movement upon the creation of the party by former Justice Minister Mikheil Saakashvili in 2001.

=== Chair of the Finance Committee ===
Ahead of the 2003 parliamentary election, Roman Gotsiridze joined the Republican Party, a liberal political organization aligned with the National Movement (UNM), and was placed in 6th position on the opposition coalition's electoral list. Despite winning a seat in Parliament, massive voter fraud led to the Rose Revolution and the cancellation of the electoral results, while the National Movement gained power when Mikheil Saakashvili was elected president. In the repeat 2004 parliamentary polls, Gotsiridze was once again placed in the electoral list of UNM and won a seat in Parliament.

Known as a leading economic expert, the new government considered him to chair the Chamber of Control. In June 2004, when the Republican Party left the ruling coalition, Gotsiridze left the party and remained with the National Movement. Despite that, he was a critique of his fellow MPs for using their ties with the President to avoid public debates. In Parliament, he was Chairman of the Finance and Budget Committee and worked extensively on adopting a balanced budget in 2004. He backed the government's proposal to drastically reduce taxes. However, he remained critical of some aspects of the new tax code, opposing the creation of a strong enforcement system and advocating for the abolition of the property tax. Though he was a supporter of privatizations, he found himself opposed to Economy Minister Kakha Bendukidze over the latter's plan of mass privatizations, including television towers and landing strips. In a list of privatization targets he drafted on behalf of the Finance Committee, he proposed the sale of the Batumi Seaport, the Poti Sea Port, the Chiatura mine and Rustavi Steel, along with 24 other targets.

Roman Gotsiridze was the sponsor of a 2005 financial amnesty bill that pardoned individuals accused of tax evasion during the Shevardnadze government. He called on the authorities to adopt a softer economic stance towards the separatist South Ossetia, opposing the permanent closure of the Ergneti Market in the conflict zone. On January 18, 2005, Gotsiridze was appointed by President Saakashvili as a member of his new nine-person Economic Council.

=== President of the NBG ===
Roman Gotsiridze was appointed by President Saakashvili on March 18, 2005, as President of the National Bank of Georgia for a seven-year term, replacing the Shevardnadze-era Irakli Managadze. In charge of the country's monetary system, he sought to increase the National Bank's standing at the international level and cooperated closely with European institutions, including Germany's Deutsche Bundesbank, with which he negotiated a training program for NBG employees. His term was marked with the arrival on the Georgian market of several foreign banks, including Ukraine's PrivatBank, Azerbaijan's PASHABank, Switzerland's HSBC, and the Allied Irish Bank. He was more cautious than Bendukidze in supporting tax cuts, being advised by the IMF of promoting balanced budgets over tax cuts. During his term, the foreign currency reserves grew from 200 million USD to 1.4 billion USD.

Roman Gotsiridze actively worked to counteract Russia's growing financial influence over the separatist republic of Abkhazia, where close to 50 banks were allegedly involved in financial activities despite an international sanctions regime, along with Kyrgyz banks. In a speech in Moscow, he made a public appeal to his Russian counterpart Sergey Ignatyev to ask him to close down Russian monetary movement in Abkhazia and threatened him with appealing to the Financial Action Task Force on Money Laundering. Though it was reported that Russia had curbed down its activities in Abkhazia following Gotsiridze's campaign, new reports revealed that Russian state and commercial banks had resumed their operations by 2007, although Kyrgyzstan had not. He also proposed a settlement where Russian banks would operate in Abkhazia through the NBG's regulatory control and also proposed the introduction of international banks into Abkhazia through the NBG's mediation, though these measures were rejected. When Russia's VTB Bank opened an ATM in Sokhumi to distribute Russian pensions, the NBG threatened the bank with the revocation of its license across Georgia.

Roman Gotsiridze's main priority was tackling inflation, pledging to prevent the rate from reaching 10%. By the end of 2005, the inflation rate had dropped to 6.2%, the lowest since 2003. However, the Russia-Georgia diplomatic crisis, which included a stiff increase in energy prices for Georgia and a Russian embargo on Georgian products led to a new rise in inflation, which reached 14.5% in August 2006. Kakha Bendukidze criticized him at the time for failing to reduce the risks posed by the large inflow of foreign investments, while the IMF warned Georgia to tighten its monetary policy. In May 2007, a parliamentary hearing accused him of delaying measures against inflation. Vladimer Papava, an economist and UNM MP, argued that the real inflation rate was higher in 2007 than the official figures, although laying the blame on the Russian embargo instead of the NBG.

In 2007, criticism of Roman Gotsiridze's presidency grew within the ranks of the ruling coalition. Some observers accused him of artificially strengthening the exchange rate of the Georgian lari. On July 11, 2007, Parliament refused to approve his annual report and instead passed a series of recommendations, including a stronger forecast of inflation, a focus on the negative consequences of the lari's appraciation, increased supervision over commercial banks, and a reduction in the NBG's administrative expenses. He presented his letter of resignation on August 30. Gotsiridze claimed that the parliamentary backlash against him had political connotations, with Speaker Nino Burjanadze eyeing the NBG presidency for her ally Irakli Kovzanadze. While President Saakashvili nominated Finance Minister Lexo Alexishvili to replace Gotsiridze, Burjanadze originally refused to confirm Gotsiridze's resignation, which led to a vacancy that was filled in interim by Gotsiridze's Vice-President David Amaglobeli.

=== Secretary of the President's Economic Council ===
Following his resignation, Roman Gotsiridze was appointed as Secretary of the President's Economic Council. He served in that position until the end of President Saakashvili's term in 2013 and his mandate coincided with the economic fallout of the 2008 Russo-Georgia War and the global recession. He remained an independent voice in government, criticizing corruption in the free distribution of public lands to private owners and siding against the move of Parliament from Tbilisi to Kutaisi.

=== In the opposition ===
==== 2016-2020 term in Parliament ====
In the 2016 parliamentary election, Roman Gotsiridze was placed in fourth position on the electoral list of UNM, winning him a seat in Parliament. He originally joined the "UNM for the Progress of Georgia" parliamentary faction led by MP Elene Khoshtaria. When the party split in early 2017 by a group of leaders that opposed the continued leadership in absentia of Mikheil Saakashvili and formed the European Georgia party, he was one of six elected MPs to choose to remain in UNM. Originally skeptical of the party's chances of surviving the split, he was chosen to chair the remaining UNM parliamentary faction on January 23, 2017, replacing Nika Melia, after a brief meeting with Saakashvili in Kyiv. He was also elected to the new Political Council of the party chosen following the split.

Roman Gotsiridze served as Deputy Chairman of the Finance and Budget Committee in 2016-2020 and routinely criticized the National Bank for its loose monetary policy. He voted in favor of only one nominee of the ruling Georgian Dream party, banker Irakli Mekvabishvili as head of the state audit agency. In 2019, he spearheaded the opposition's campaign against the nomination by President Salome Zourabichvili of Davit Narmania as head of the National Energy and Water Supply Regulatory Commission. A vocal critique of the government, he called for the resignation of Prime Minister Giorgi Kvirikashvili when the latter called the separation of Church and State a "misplaced idea", called for the creation of an investigative committee to study the killing of Tamaz Machalikashvili during an anti-terrorism raid in the Pankisi Valley, while refusing to take part in a similar investigative committee meant to study the murder of two teenagers during a street fight in downtown Tbilisi in 2017.

As Chairman of the UNM Faction in Parliament, he's been credited with keeping the party's legislative work alive despite a large "brain drain" following the European Georgia split. He has been critical of alleged ties of the Georgian government with Russia, filing a lawsuit against a classified 2017 deal between Tbilisi and Gazprom Export. Following visits to Moscow by MPs from the Alliance of Patriots party, he claimed that the "Kremlin had infiltrated Parliament". During international negotiations, his faction called on Western powers to impose sanctions on Russia over the borderization of the South Ossetian administrative boundary line.

Roman Gotsiridze refused to participate in the 2017 Constitutional Commission that revised the country's constitution and created a parliamentary republic and his faction later boycotted the vote adopting the new document, arguing that the new Constitution would centralize power in the hands of Georgian Dream.

Gotsiridze chaired the UNM Faction during the large-scale 2019-2020 protests that started as anti-Russian demonstrations and continued as protests against police violence and for democratic reforms. His party at the time called for the resignation of the government, the appointment of early parliamentary elections, and speeding up the transition to a fully proportional electoral system. During a negotiation meeting with Prime Minister Giorgi Gakharia on September 7, 2019, he and the rest of his faction walked out of the meeting. He filed a lawsuit at the Constitutional Court over the MP mandate termination of Nika Melia, who was accused by the authorities of attempting to overthrow the government. Following the failure by Georgian Dream to pass a compromise constitutional amendment on the transition to a fully proportional electoral system, he announced his faction's boycott of the legislature and notably place a bike lock on the doors of the Parliament's main hall. The failure to find a compromise aggravated the political crisis, while Gotsiridze backed calls for a blockade of Parliament through protests. In December 2019, he was involved in a brawl with GD MP Dachi Beraia, who was recorded kicking him.

Following the March 8, 2020, agreement between Georgian Dream and the opposition, Roman Gotsiridze announced an end to his boycott so that his faction could vote in a proposed electoral reform that reduced the number of majoritarian districts. He remained strongly critical of the authorities, however, and accused President Zourabichvili of reneging on the agreement after her refusal to pardon UNM activist Giorgi Rurua.

During the COVID-19 pandemic, Roman Gotsiridze and his faction voted in favor of a declaration of a state of emergency in April 2020. However, he refused to vote for the state of emergency's extension one month later after arguing that the government had enforced regulations irregularly, thus causing economic disbalance. He was also critical of the poor financial aid provided to families during the economic crisis and accused the government of violating checks and balances for failing to have its anti-crisis plan approved in Parliament. Roman Gotsiridze was one of the first public figures to be vaccinated with the Oxford–AstraZeneca COVID-19 vaccine.

==== Since 2020 ====
During the 2020 parliamentary election, Roman Gotsiridze was once again included in UNM's electoral list, although the party ran under the Strength Is in Unity coalition. Though he would win reelection, he was one of 49 MPs to declare a boycott after refusing to recognize the results of the election following allegations of massive voter fraud. He entered Parliament in May 2021 after the release from prison of UNM Chairman Nika Melia following a short-lived EU-facilitated agreement between Georgian Dream and the opposition. Though no longer chairman of the UNM Faction, he remains Deputy Chair of the Finance and Budget Committee.

He has been a supporter of Mikheil Saakashvili's controversial return to Georgia in October 2021. He has visited the former president in prison since his detention, in particular to take part in writing an economic program for UNM. However, he refused to boycott Parliament in December 2022 after calls to do so by UNM activists in December 2022 over the postponement of Saakashvili's trial. He has also criticized President Zourabichvili for her refusal to pardon Nika Gvaramia.

During the ongoing debates over reforms to satisfy the European Commission's recommendations for Georgia to obtain EU candidacy status, he supports the creation of a neutral parliamentary commission that would draft a list of oligarchs to be sanctioned by the government.

On February 17, 2023, Roman Gotsiridze announced via a Facebook post his departure from the United National Movement. He remains an independent MP, caucusing with the parliamentary opposition. His departure from the party has been associated with the change in leadership that took place a month prior.

== Political views ==
=== Economic policy ===
Roman Gotsiridze is a supporter of free markets and his economic views are identified as libertarian. He chairs to free market NGOs, the Economic Development Center of Georgia and the Economic Research Center at the International Black Sea University. Throughout his political career, he has sided against higher taxes, calling for an abolition of the property tax and the adoption of a flat tax. During the major 2004 tax reform that drastically reduced tax rates across the board, he successfully fought against the implementation of a tax audit system, arguing that individuals should not have to declare their expenses to the state. He also opposes excise taxes on goods like cigarettes, calling them "taxes on the poor". In February 2019, he sponsored a bill introducing tax benefits for small businesses, including increasing the VAT exemption on small businesses from 100,000 GEL to 160,000 GEL of income, though the bill failed in committee.

Gotsiridze is also opposed to increased economic regulations, which he has called "the main economic problem of the country". Notably, following a 2017 fire in a Batumi hotel that killed 12 people, he opposed new fire regulations, instead arguing in favor of a stronger private insurance system. When a mine shaft accident in 2018 killed four workers at the Mindeli mine in Tkibuli, he warned against the closure of the mine. Roman Gotsiridze has been opposed to increasing welfare programs and subsidies to the wine industry, while supporting decreasing funding to the Georgian Public Broadcaster. Himself a former President of the National Bank of Georgia, he remains opposed to strong government oversight of the bank, including over privacy concerns. He has repeatedly raised concern over increased levels of public debt.

Gotsiridze is a supporter of free trade and has voted against protectionist programs promoted by the Georgian government, including a moratorium on the sale of agricultural lands to foreigners and a state-funded Produce in Georgia campaign that includes grants for Georgian manufacturers. While a supporter of privatizations, he has supported restrictions on the sale of state property to Russian companies. During a controversial 2018 raid of a nightclub by law enforcement over reports of prostitution, he stated that the raid was a violation of property rights and that the solution to prostitution was "the creation of a stronger economy". However, he voted for a 2017 bill that banned smoking in buildings.

=== Government and politics ===
Roman Gotsiridze supports a fully proportional electoral system to select the country's Parliament and was against delaying the country's electoral transition from 2020 to 2024. He has, however, opposed the abolition of electoral thresholds. He has come out against gender-based quotas in Parliament, but voted nonetheless for a 2018 bill establishing them.

Gotsiridze supports direct presidential elections, while the current Constitution sets out elections through an Electoral College starting in 2024. He has publicly opposed the idea supported by the Georgian Orthodox Church of restoring the monarchy in Georgia. In addition, he's been critical of the influence of the Church on the judicial branch, criticizing judges for quoting Catholicos-Patriarch Ilia II in judicial opinions favoring abortion restrictions. He also criticized the Church for its refusal to cooperate with regulations during the COVID-19 pandemic.

A supporter of limited governments, he's called for the abolition of several ministries.
