= Honolulu University =

University in Hawaii, United States

Honolulu University of the Arts, Sciences, and Humanities, or just Honolulu University, is an unaccredited institution of nontraditional higher education (distance learning).

== History ==
The institution was founded by Warren Walker as Golden State University in California, United States, and later moved to Hawaii, where it was incorporated as a non-profit corporation in February 1987.

== Accreditation and affiliation ==
The institution is affiliated with the International Management Association of Hong Kong, which also identifies American City University as an affiliate.

It has been alleged that until 2005 Honolulu University was a full institutional member of the International Council for Open and Distance Education (ICDE), which is not an accreditation body. In its advertising Honolulu University at one time claimed accreditation by "Akademie für Internationale Kultur- und Wissenschaftsförderung", which was not a generally recognized accrediting body in Europe and apparently also is defunct or dormant, although still registered as a non-profit association with the district court of Duisburg, Germany, under the number 51324.

== Events ==
The institution received media attention because of lawsuits resulting from irregularities related to school agents in Asia who failed to properly disclose the unaccredited status of the school to prospective students. The school lost in court and the Hawaii Office of Consumer Protection was at one time processing requests for tuition refunds. Honolulu University in turn sued their Singaporean agent, who in the meantime had died.

== See also ==
- List of unaccredited institutions of higher learning
