= Tivoli Building (Cheyenne, Wyoming) =

Coordinates: 41°07′56″N 104°48′59″W

Tivoli Building, 2015

The Tivoli Building is a historic building at 301 West Lincolnway (301 West 16th Street) in downtown Cheyenne, Wyoming, and a part of the Downtown Cheyenne Historic District.

The three-story Victorian building was built in 1892. Its design incorporates several elements typical of Queen Anne style architecture, including an oriel window, an octagonal ornamented turret, and use of foliated stone, as well as some Chateauesque and Romanesque Revival architectural elements. The hipped roof of the building and the roof of the turret were both covered with pressed metal sheets. In October 1892 a local newspaper described the new building as "palatial", with interior fixtures "as fine as can be seen in any city west of Chicago".

The Tivoli Building was designed for use as an eating and drinking establishment; it included a cold storage facility that also supported wholesaling of Pabst beer. For many years, it housed a saloon (during Prohibition, a speakeasy) on its main floor and a brothel in its second story. The committee that planned the first Cheyenne Frontier Days in 1897 met in one of the Tivoli Building's upstairs rooms.

The building deteriorated in the 20th century. Its last drinking establishment moved out in the 1960s. It stood vacant for some time before being acquired by the Cheyenne Chamber of Commerce, which completed an interior and exterior renovation in 1981. In 1978, the Tivoli Building was added to the National Register of Historic Places as one of ten contributing buildings deemed to be of "exceptional architectural significance" to the Downtown Cheyenne Historic District.

The Tivoli Building was purchased in 2006 by Matt Mead, who was at the time a U.S. Attorney, and his wife Carol. The Meads completed a partial renovation in 2010. That same year, Matt Mead used the building as his campaign headquarters in his successful effort to be elected governor of Wyoming. In May 2012, Governor Mead and his wife received an award from the city's historic preservation board in recognition of their work to restore the building's interior to match its original design.

Before the Meads purchased the building in 2006, the first floor had housed the Tivoli coffee shop. American City University, an unaccredited distance education institution, earlier had its offices on the second floor. As of 2012, the first floor is the home of a brewpub operated by Freedom's Edge Brewing Company.
