= Natela Turnava =

Governor of the National Bank of Georgia

Natia Turnava
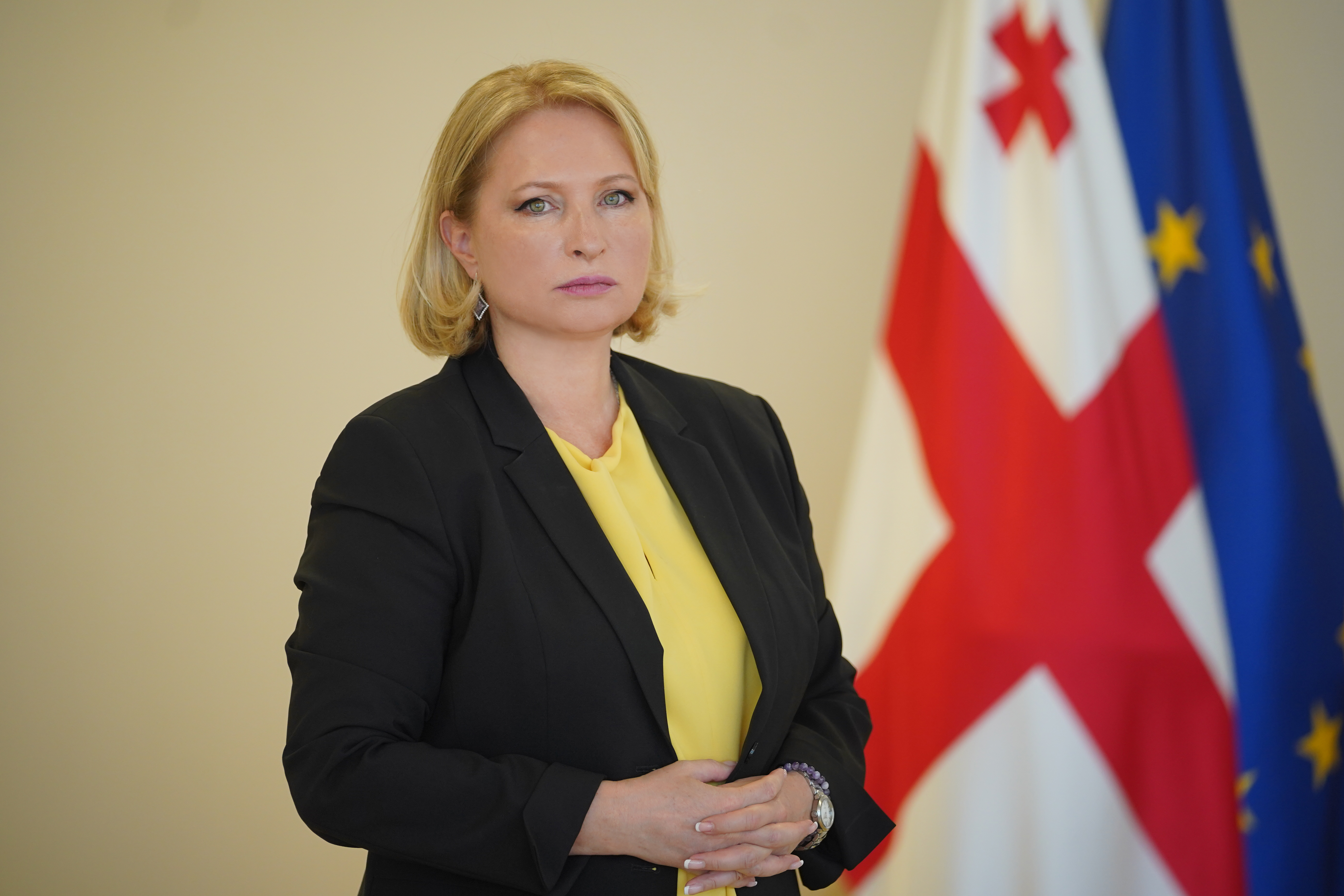
- Natela Turnava in 2020

President of the National Bank of Georgia
- Incumbent
- Assumed office 7 February 2025
- Preceded by: Koba Gvenetadze

Minister of Economy and Sustainable Development
- In office 18 April 2019 – 9 February 2022
- Prime Minister: Mamuka Bakhtadze; Giorgi Gakharia; Irakli Garibashvili
- Preceded by: Giorgi Kobulia
- Succeeded by: Levan Davitashvili

Vice President and Acting President of the National Bank of Georgia
- In office June 2022 – 7 October 2025

Personal details
- Born: 19 October 1968 (age 57) Moscow, Russian SSR, USSR (now Russia)
- Party: Georgian Dream
- Education: Tbilisi State University
- Website: Government of Georgia

Natela Turnava (Georgian: ნათელა თურნავა) (born 19 October 1968), usually referred to as Natia Turnava, is a Georgian politician. She was minister of Economy and Sustainable Development of Georgia from 18 April 2019 to 9 February 2022. As of October 2025, she is the President of the National Bank of Georgia.

== Biography ==
Turnava was born in 1968 in Moscow, the capital city of the then Russian SSR (now Russia). She studied in No. 56 Public School of Tbilisi and in 1990, she graduated from Tbilisi State University as an economist. She defended her dissertation and was awarded the degree of Doctor of Economic Sciences in 1994. In 1994–1996, she was a scientist at the Institute of Democracy and Politics of Georgia. From 2000 to 2005, she was the first Deputy Minister of Economy and Sustainable Development of Georgia. She returned to that position in 2018–2019. From 2005 to 2013, she then became First Deputy Minister of the Economy, before for the next five years becoming Deputy Executive Director of the Partnership Fund and a member of the governing board of the Georgian Industrial Group.

From April 2019 until February 2022, she served as the Minister of Economy and Sustainable Development. In this period, she oversaw the implementation of many programs to support businesses during the COVID-19 pandemic. During her time as minister, she terminated the government contract with the Ankalia Deep Sea Port project, which ended up in a lawsuit. She also terminated contracts with Turkish construction company Enka after months of protest against the company. In June 2023, Turnava was appointed acting Governor of the National Bank of Georgia. It took until February 2025 for her to be appointed permanent governor due to political opposition.

Turnava speaks Georgian, Russian, and English.
