= Bank of Georgia =

Bank headquartered in Tbilisi, Georgia

Bank of Georgia JSC Georgian: საქართველოს ბანკი

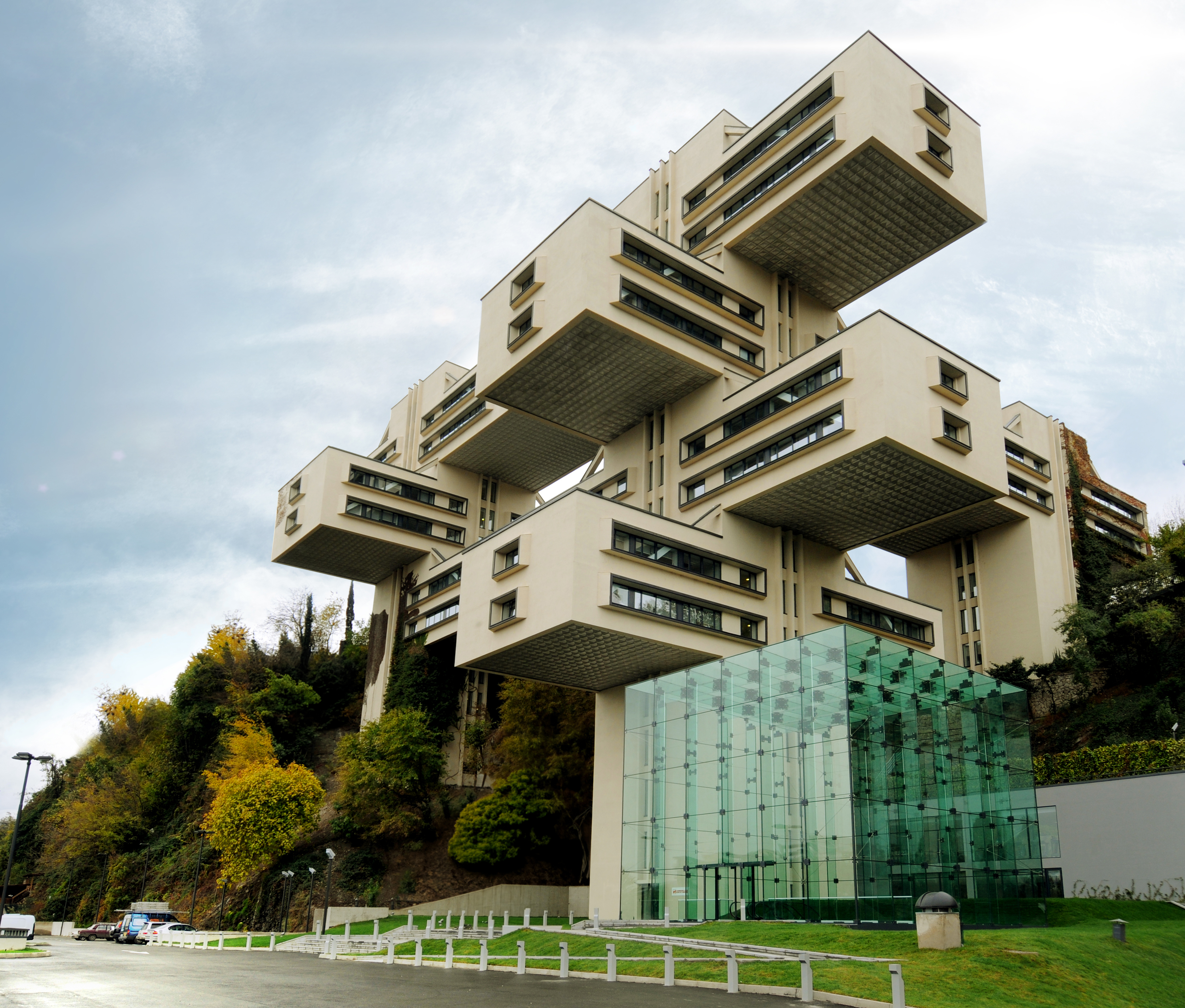
- Head office of Bank of Georgia in Tbilisi, Georgia.
- Type: Joint Stock Company
- Traded as: GeSE: GEB
- Industry: Banking; Financial services
- Founded: 21 October 1994; 32 years ago
- Headquarters: Tbilisi, Georgia
- Area served: Georgia
- Key people: Mel Carvill (Independent Chairman); Archil Gachechiladze (CEO)
- Products: Retail Banking; Commercial Banking; Investment Banking; Corporate banking; Private Banking; Investment banking; Wealth and investment management; Deposits and lending; Payment and money-transfer services; Foreign-exchange services; Trade Finance; SME finance
- Owner: Lion Finance Group 99.56%; Other 0.44%
- Website: bankofgeorgia.ge

Bank of Georgia JSC (Georgian: საქართველოს ბანკი, romanized: sakartvelos bank'i) is a Georgian universal bank and financial services, company founded in 1994, with its headquarters in Tbilisi, Georgia. It received its banking licence from the National Bank of Georgia on 15 December 1994.

Bank of Georgia is Georgia's second largest bank by total assets after TBC Bank. It is considered to be a systemically important bank by the National Bank of Georgia. For 2026, the bank is subject to a systemic importance buffer of 3.0%.

Bank of Georgia is a subsidiary of the Lion Finance Group plc, a United Kingdom-incorporated financial-services holding company listed on the London Stock Exchange and included in the FTSE 100 Index starting from 2026.

== History ==
Bank of Georgia traces its origins to 1903. The bank was later nationalised during the Soviet period and became the state-owned Binsotsbank Following Georgia’s transition to a market economy, Binsotsbank was privatised in 1994 and renamed Bank of Georgia. The present legal entity, JSC Bank of Georgia, was established on 21 October 1994 and received its banking licence from the National Bank of Georgia on 15 December 1994. In the late 20th century, it was owned by the European Bank for Reconstruction and Development, the German Investment Corporation and the Georgian physicist, Vitaly Gelarani.

Bank of Georgia was first listed on the Georgian Stock Exchange in 2000. In 2004, it acquired TbilUniversalBank and Georgian Card, a card-processing platform, as part of a period of expansion and infrastructure development.

Starting from 2004, Bank of Georgia completed a number of strategic acquisitions, introduced a series of packaged retail products and initiated major infrastructure upgrades. In 2009, the bank introduced the premium banking service brand SOLO.

This is when the Bank launched its private banking, placed debut corporate bonds on the Georgian Stock Exchange.

In 2006, Bank of Georgia listed its shares on the London Stock Exchange in the form of global depositary receipts, the first international IPO from Georgia. The period following the listing was marked by the issuance of the first Eurobond, further acquisitions, and new international partnerships, including with American Express.

A new holding company Bank of Georgia Holdings (now Lion Finance Group) was established in October 2011 and secured a listing on the main market of the London Stock Exchange in April 2012.

In 2012, the group moved to the premium segment of the London Stock Exchange and entered the FTSE 250 Index. In May 2018, BGEO Group split into two completely separate, independently listed, and independently managed companies: the financial and banking business fully separated from the investment business, resulting in two independent entities - Bank of Georgia Group PLC, which directly manages banking operations, and Georgia Capital PLC, which manages the investment side.

In 2014, Bank of Georgia acquired Tao Private Bank, the 9th largest bank in Georgia at the time of acquisition.

In 2020, the European Investment Bank signed a €50 million loan deal with the Bank of Georgia for small and medium enterprises (SMEs) and mid-caps. The Bank of Georgia typically lends the funds to local businesses, such as the Swiss Agricultural School Caucasus.

In February 2024, Bank of Georgia Group announced the proposed acquisition of 100% of a leading bank in Armenia, Ameriabank, for approximately $303.6 million. The acquisition was completed in March 2024.

On 6 February 2025, Bank of Georgia Group PLC changed its name to Lion Finance Group PLC to reflect the group’s operations in both Georgia and Armenia. Bank of Georgia and Ameriabank continued to operate as separate banks under their existing brands. On 25 March 2025, JSC BGEO Group acquired the remaining 0.44% minority interest in Bank of Georgia, increasing its ownership to 100%.

Global Finance magazine named Bank of Georgia the World's Best Digital Bank in 2024, 2025, and 2026. It was also named the World’s Best Bank for AI in Finance in 2026.

Bank of Georgia’s shares were delisted from the Georgian Stock Exchange on 27 June 2025. The bank itself is therefore no longer publicly listed, although its ultimate parent company, Lion Finance Group PLC, remains listed on the London Stock Exchange.

Lion Finance Group joined the FTSE 100 Index on 23 March 2026 following the March 2026 quarterly review.

== Products and operations ==
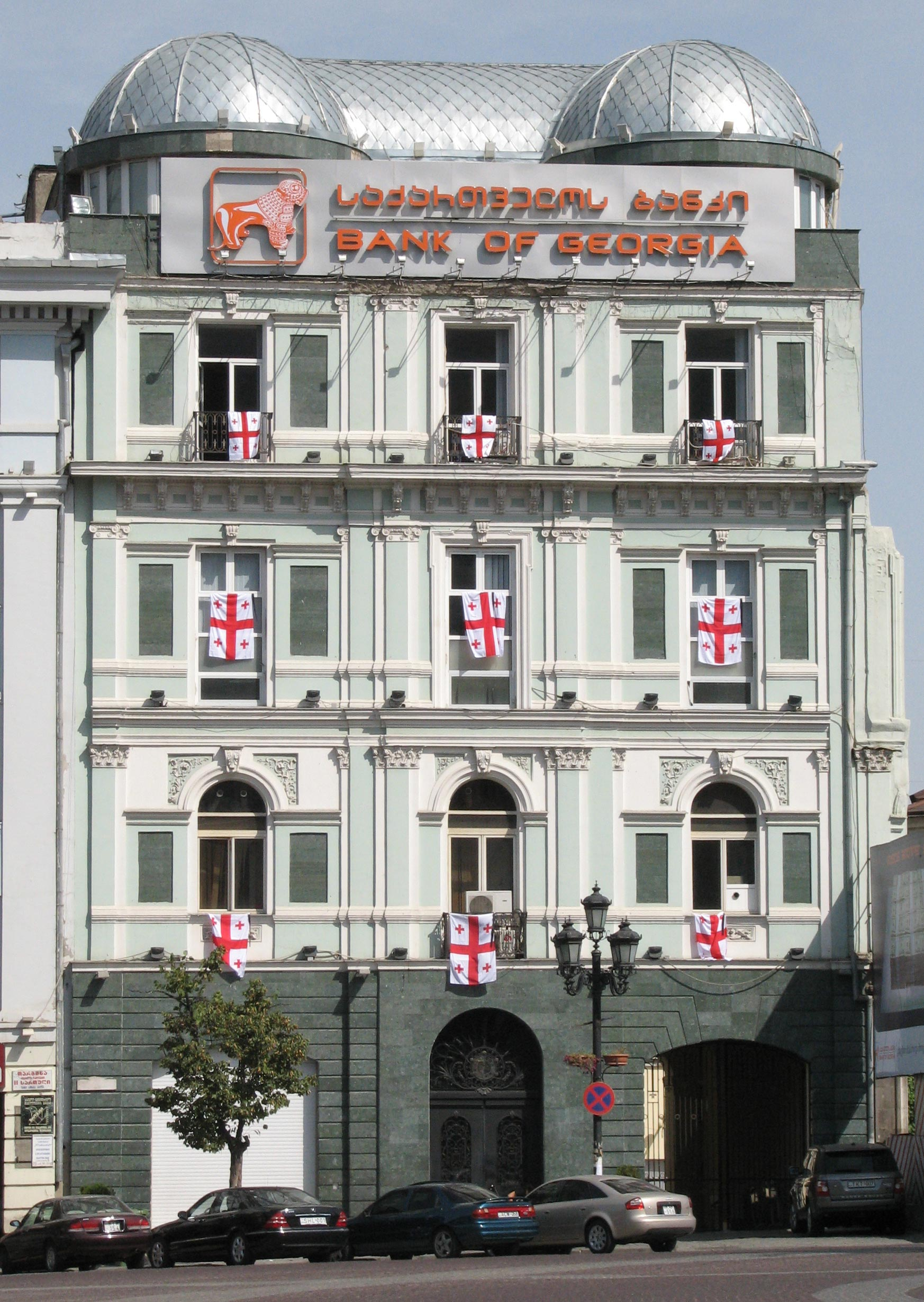
Former building of the Bank of Georgia on Freedom Square, Tbilisi

As of December 2025, Bank of Georgia has one of the largest distribution networks in Georgia, comprising 200 branches (104 full-service and 96 transactional branches) and a call center.

Bank of Georgia business consists of three key business segments: Retail Banking (RB) operations in Georgia, comprising subsegments that serve mass retail (Mass Retail), and mass affluent and high-net-worth clients (Premium Banking); SME Banking (SME) operations in Georgia, serving small and medium-sized businesses; and Corporate Banking (CB) operations in Georgia, serving corporate and institutional customers.

Bank of Georgia is one of the largest financial institutions in the country, accounting for approximately 40% of the total banking sector assets in Georgia.

Retail banking

Retail Banking (RB) is divided into two sub-segments that serve mass retail (Mass Retail), and mass affluent and high-net-worth clients (Premium Banking). The Retail Banking products include consumer loans, mortgage loans, overdrafts, credit cards and other credit facilities, funds transfers and settlement services, and handling of customers’ deposits.

Small and medium-sized enterprises

SME Banking serves small and medium-sized businesses providing financial and value-added services including business loans, payments processing, and financial advisory. The Bank was awarded Best SME Banking in Central and Eastern Europe by Global Finance in 2022.

Corporate Banking

Bank of Georgia’s Corporate Banking segment serves large businesses in Georgia. It mainly provides loans and other credit facilities, funds transfers and settlement services, trade finance services, documentary operations support and handles saving and term deposits for corporate and institutional customers.

In the field of education, Bank of Georgia sponsors students through various scholarship programs, including international ones such as the Fulbright Graduate Student Programme, the Chevening Scholarship Programme and Miami ad School of Europe scholarship program.

Bank of Georgia is the general sponsor of the Georgian National Olympic and Paralympic Committees, Georgian Football Federation and the main sponsor of the Georgian Basketball Federation.

== See also ==
- TBC Bank
- National Bank of Georgia
