= David Amaglobeli =

Georgian economist

David Amaglobeli დავით ამაღლობელი

Governor of the National Bank of Georgia
- In office October 2007 – February 2009
- Preceded by: Roman Gotsiridze
- Succeeded by: Giorgi Kadagidze

Personal details
- Born: 8 August 1976 (age 49) Tbilisi, Georgia)

David Amaglobeli (georg. დავით ამაღლობელი) is a Georgian economist who was acting president of the National Bank of Georgia (NBG) between October 2007 and February 2009.

== Biography ==
Amaglobeli was born on August 8, 1976, in Tbilisi, Georgia. In 1998 he graduated with a diploma in economics from Tbilisi State University and in 2001 he received the degree of Master of Science in Economics from Oregon State University.

In 1998-1999 David Amaglobeli worked as an economist at the committee of economic policy and reforms at the Parliament of Georgia and in 1999-2001, in parallel to his graduate studies, he worked as a research/teaching assistant.

In 2001-02 David Amaglobeli worked as the department head at the ministry of tax revenues of Georgia and in 2002-03 as a consultant to the government of Georgia on fiscal and monetary policy issues for the state commission responsible for the development of poverty reduction and growth program.

From January 2004 David Amaglobeli worked as a fiscal economist at the International Monetary Fund local office in Tbilisi and the same year he was appointed as a deputy minister of finance. From March 2005 till October 2009 David Amaglobeli served as a deputy governor and from October 2007 till February 2009 as acting governor of the NBG.

In his capacity of the governor of the NBG, David Amaglobeli initiated various legislative and institutional reforms. In particular, inflation targeting was adopted as the monetary policy regime, monetary policy committee and main policy interest rate were introduced, a transparent foreign currency auction system was adopted as the main instrument for market interventions. As a result of institutional reforms the size of staff was significantly reduced, and payment systems (cash and cash free) and reserve management reform projects were initiated.

During David Amaglobeli’s tenure at the NBG, the country experienced severe exogenous shocks. Despite the severe consequences from war with Russia in August 2008 and from the 2008 financial crisis, the country maintained macroeconomic and banking sector stability.
