= Koba Gvenetadze =

Georgian economist

Governor of the National Bank of Georgia
- In office March 2016 – 7 February 2025
- Preceded by: Giorgi Kadagidze
- Succeeded by: Natia Turnava

Personal details
- Born: 26 December 1971 (age 54)
- Education: Tbilisi State University; American University

Koba Gvenetadze (born 26 December 1971) has been Governor of the National Bank of Georgia since March 2016.

== Education and career ==
Gvenetadze was educated at Tbilisi State University and graduated with a masters in economics from the American University in Washington, D.C. He was formerly Deputy Minister of Finance and a Deputy State Minister, before serving as a Senior Economist at the International Monetary Fund between 2002 and 2015.

== Other activities ==
- International Monetary Fund (IMF), Ex-Officio Member of the Board of Governors (since 2016)

== Awards and honors ==
- Gvenetadze was ranked among the Best Central Bankers by "Global Finance" five times (2018, 2019, 2020, 2021, 2022).
