= Ameriabank =

Bank of Armenia

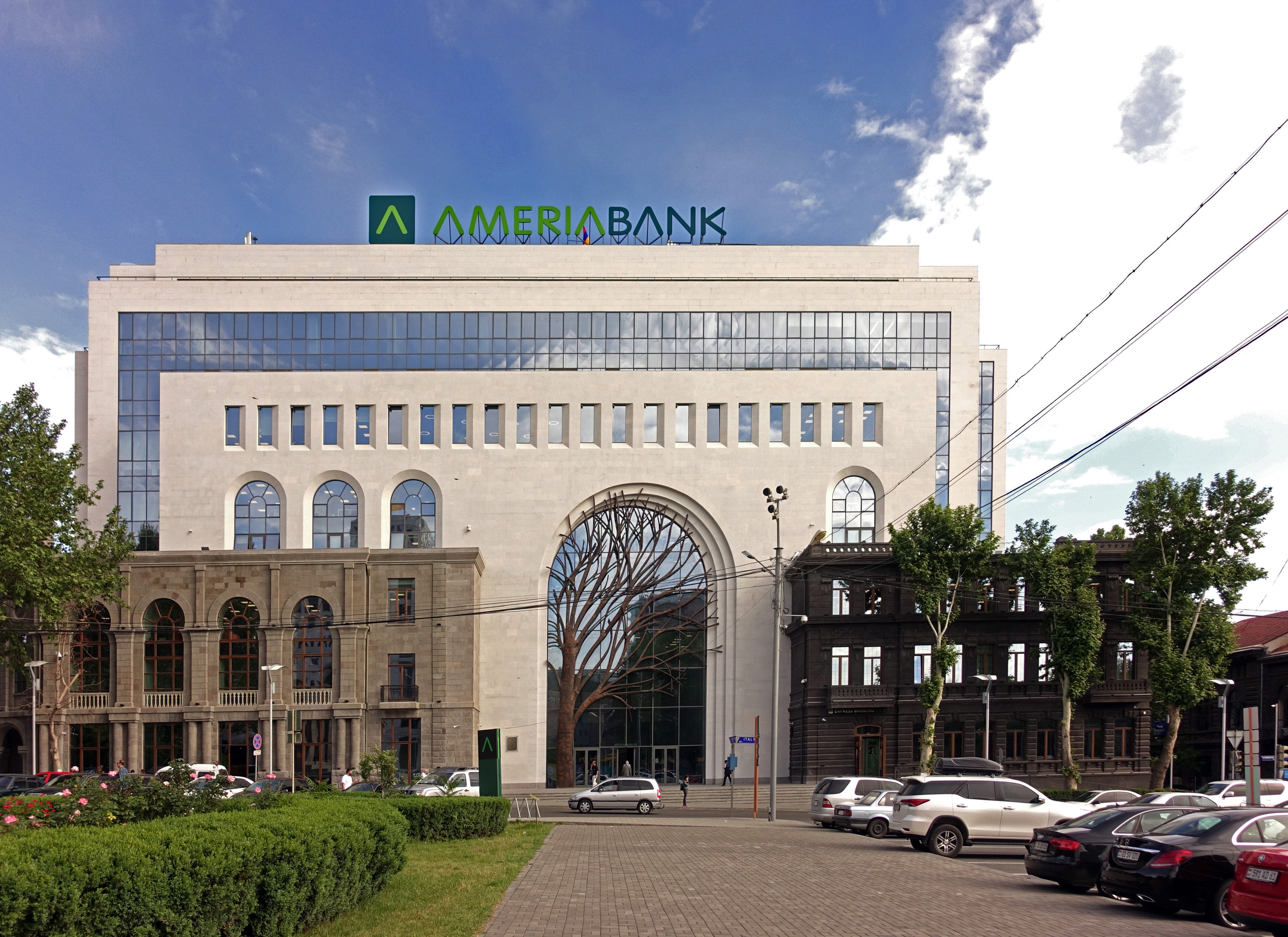
- Ameriabank's headquarters in Yerevan
- Company type: CJSC
- Industry: Banking, Financial services
- Founded: 1910; 116 years ago
- Headquarters: Yerevan, Armenia
- Products: Corporate, credit cards, consumer banking, corporate banking, investment banking, mortgage loans, private banking, wealth management
- Total assets: ▲AMD 1,252 billion (Dec 2022)
- Owner: Bank of Georgia Group Plc - 90%; Directly - 60% Through Bank of Georgia Jsc - 30%: European Bank for Reconstruction and Development - 10%
- Number of employees: 1426 (Dec 2022)
- Website: www.ameriabank.am

Ameriabank CJSC (Armenian: Ամերիաբանկ ՓԲԸ) is an Armenian universal bank offering corporate, investment and retail banking services headquartered in Yerevan, Armenia.

== History ==
Ameriabank was established in 1910 as a branch of Caucasian Trade Bank, which during the Soviet era was transformed into the Armenian branch of the Foreign Trade Bank of the USSR. It became a standalone bank again in 1992 after it obtained a banking license from the Central Bank of Armenia. By 2014, it had won the Euromoney award for best bank in Armenia three times.

In 2014, the bank introduced AmeriaToken, a one-time password generator.

In December 2015, the European Bank for Reconstruction and Development (EBRD) acquired a stake in Ameriabank's statutory capital. The bank's statutory capital increased by AMD 6,639,680,000.

In February 2018, the Asian Development Bank (ADB) acquired a stake in the bank's statutory capital. The bank's statutory capital increased by AMD 5,213,120,000.

In February 2024, management of Ameriabank signed an agreement about its acquisition by the Bank of Georgia. That has to be agreed to by the respective shareholder meetings and financial oversight authorities.

Currently, the statutory fund of the bank is AMD 54,414,765,000 Armenian drams which consists of 117,021 ordinary nominal shares with par value of AMD 465,000 each.

== Gallery ==
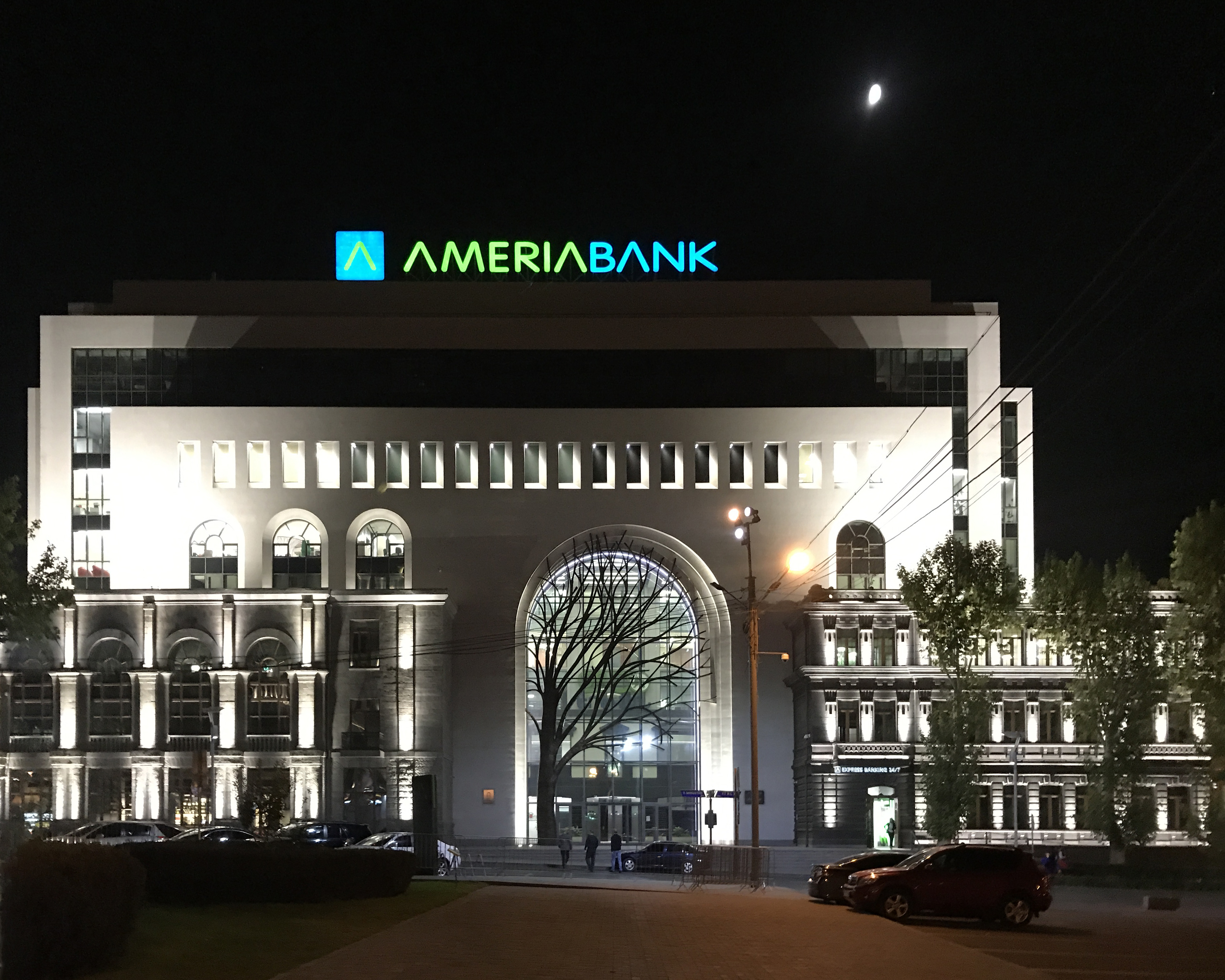
The bank's headquarters in Yerevan at night

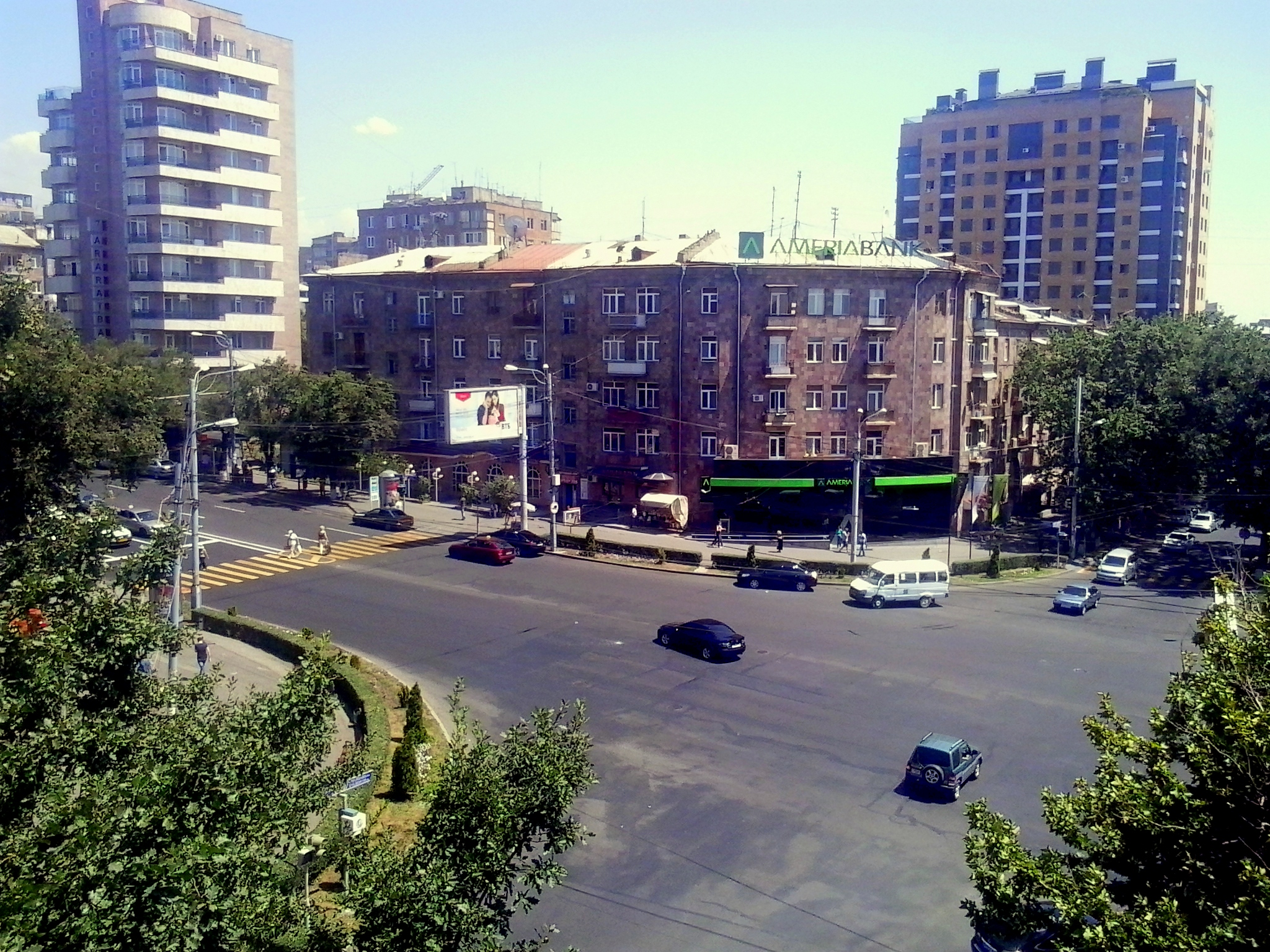
Ameriabank's Komitas branch, Yerevan

Former logo used until 2023

== See also ==
- List of banks
- List of banks in Armenia
