= Cafe Fantasy =

Café Fantasy
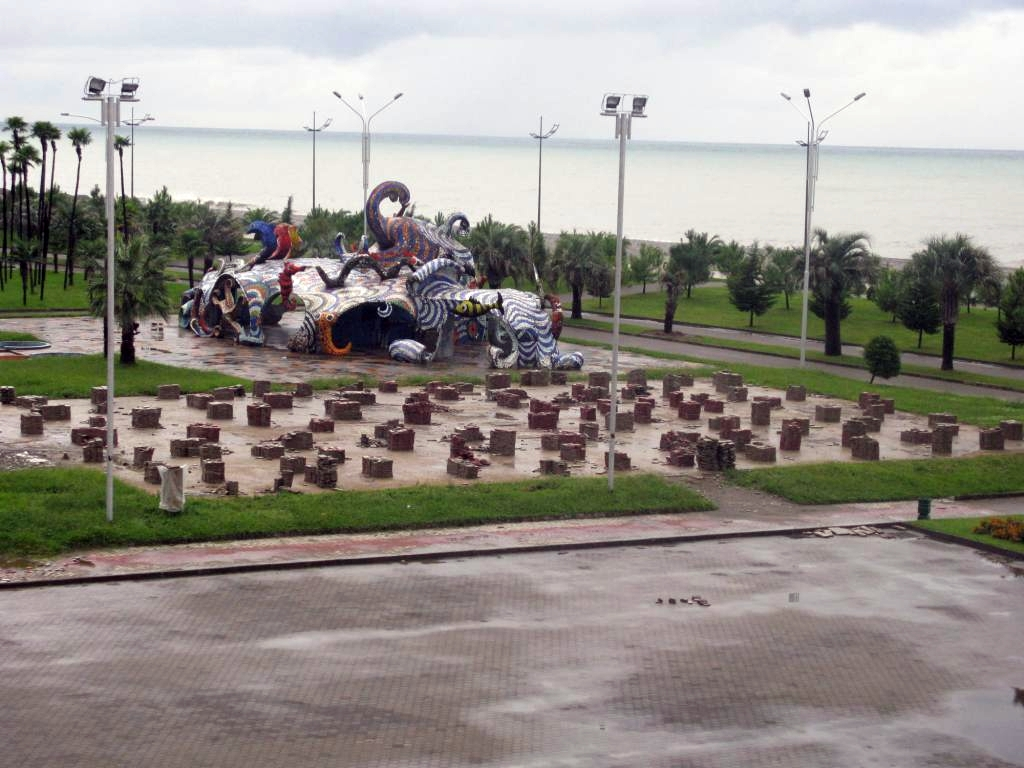
- Interactive map of Café Fantasy

Restaurant information
- Established: 1975
- Closed: 2000
- Location: Batumi, Adjara, Georgia
- Coordinates: 41.650074°N 41.625361°E

Café Fantasy (Georgian: კაფე ფანტაზია k'ape pant'azia) or the Octopus (რვაფეხა rvapekha) was a coffeehouse situated in the town of Batumi (the autonomous Republic of Adjara, Georgia), on the boulevard by the Black Sea, beside Shota Rustaveli State University. It used to face the old holiday house “Batumi”, recently replaced by Hilton Batumi.

== History ==
The monument, which also functioned as a café, was designed by the Georgian architect George Chakhava and by Zurab Kapanadze, Professor at the Tbilisi State Academy of Arts. The group of professionals working on the building included architect Zurab Jalaghonia and Nodar Malazonia, Honoured Artist of Georgia, chief illustrator of the satirical magazine Niangi (Crocodile). The technical plan was prepared by the road engineer Paata Doborjginidze. Construction work took 8 months.

In 1975 the building was completed and Fantasy Café was opened, immediately becoming a popular meeting point for both Batumi residents and its numerous guests. It was especially favored by young people. Cafe Fantasy also known as Batumi Octopus.

During the Soviet period visitors to the Octopus could buy freshly brewed coffee, ice-cream and soft drinks. Due to the café's location near the strict border between the USSR and NATO member Turkey, it was closed at 10 pm every night.

On August 14, 2019, this unique building reopened.

== Architectural and artistic value ==
The Octopus represents a construction resting upon eight ‘Octopus’ arms with eight arched openings between them. It is an iron structure, pulled together and welded on the spot according to a special plan. In architecture it is known as double shell or gridshell structure. The structure is coated with iron netting, plastered and faced with colored mosaic pieces, or so-called tesserae, which was made by a special technology and patented in Leningrad (now St Petersburg). The building is actually a light construction as it is hollow in the inside. Consequently, it is quite delicate. However, its unique firmness can be accounted for by the structural features created by its designers. These are curved forms united under the same covering “whose uniqueness lies in the fact that their thickness is insignificant compared to other dimensions of the construction, which makes it possible for such a complex building to look amazingly elegant and slender. Actually the presence of such constructions in Georgia proves that living behind the Iron Curtain, our country witnessed the same processes as those going on in the rest of the world at that time.”

About the location and coating of the building architect Giorgi Chakhava said that "The main inspiration of my creativity - is the unique nature of my country with its individuality and beauty of each region in harmony with mountain villages".

=== Mosaics ===
The Octopus, whose surface reflects the iridescent sea, is decorated with different sea animals including dolphins that are considered to be a symbol of Batumi, seahorses, starfish, and fish of different colours.

The construction stands on a tiled platform. A paved path with low steps and a cascade of fountains leads from the hotel to the Octopus. The platform is tiled with terracotta red spots scattered against a light-coloured background. This is made complete by a reflection of sea and sky on the smooth surface of the mosaic.

=== The Octopus in relation to western art ===
Construction methods similar to those applied by the designers of Octopus were employed by renowned architects throughout the world. The buildings created according to those methods include Shukhov Tower (hyperbolic steel gridshell), the Philips Pavilion (1958) designed by Iannis Xenakis and Le Corbusier, the buildings constructed by Félix Candela using hyperbolic paraboloid structure, John F. Kennedy (JFK) Airport designed by Eero Saarinen, Geodesic Domes by R. Buckminster Fuller, Sydney Opera House by Jørn Utzon, striking constructions by the Swiss engineer Heinz Isler, the bus terminal by Eladio Dieste, seaside pavilions by the East German engineer Ulrich Muther and many other well-known buildings.

The mosaics and themes of Fantasy Café bear a close resemblance to Antoni Gaudí’s mosaics in Park Güell, Barcelona, especially to his multicoloured mosaic salamander, "el drac". The spots scattered over the surface around the phantasmagorical and surrealistic construction of the Octopus, and their application as artistic and expressive means can be associated with the name of the contemporary artist Yayoi Kusama. Her spots, which are identical to the spots of the platform where Octopus stands, made a revolution and won wide recognition long after their introduction and became an integral part of modern art.

The Batumi Octopus can be attributed to Hippie Art rather than Soviet Art as this polychromic, cheerful, individual and unaggressive creation stands out from the Soviet art of that period. Although Fantasy Café was constructed during the Soviet period, due to the advanced construction technology and unconventional surrealistic forms employed by its creators it is not only different from the then mainstream architecture, but can be regarded as an example of counterculture art.

=== Octopus in Art ===
Fantasy Café has been used as a background for numerous Georgian music videos; a large number of postcards with its picture both in summer and in snow have been printed; and many tourists as well as professional photographers have taken photos of this building.

=== Memorabilia ===
Broken glass pieces of tesserae were collected by Batumi citizens and its visitors as memorabilia. It was used to embellish a silver pendant in 2015.

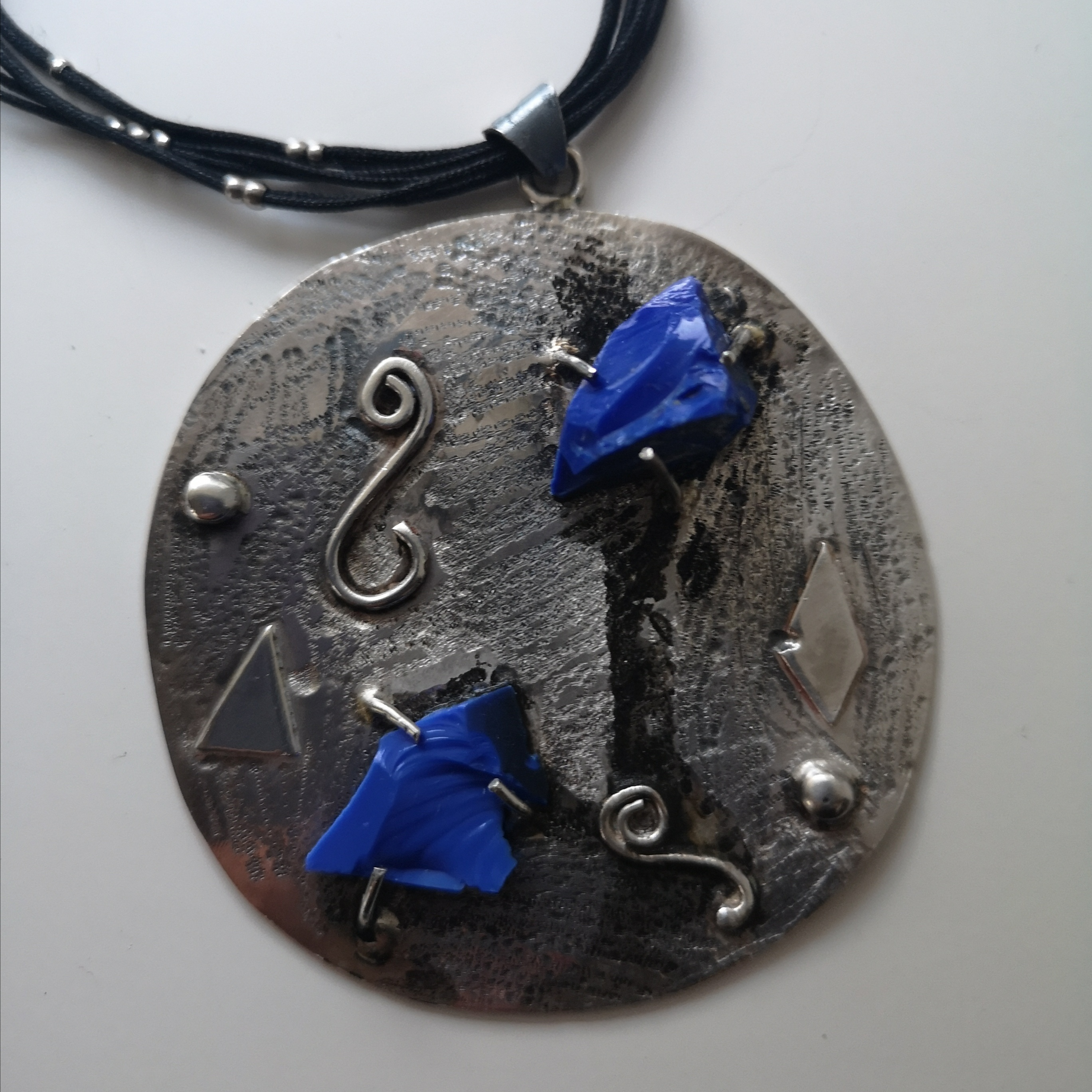
Silver pendant embellished with "Octopus" tesserae

== Demolition controversy ==
In 2000 the café ceased functioning and since then it has been abandoned. Consequently, its surface was damaged and its premises have been suffering from the lack of sanitation. In addition, the building has not yet been placed on the list of immovable cultural heritage monuments. Based on the information spread through the media, builders of new hotel want to invest in the adaptation of the adjacent territory. So it is expected that the Octopus may fall victim to the development of the area, which implies building of new cafés, swimming pools and planting lawns and trees. The investing company is not giving any information regarding the future of the old cafe. But the government of the region is arguing in favor of investment, rather than monument. The assumption was made that the damages suffered by the Octopus are too grave to be restored. On the other hand, many think that the construction has not been seriously damaged. The possibility of moving the building has also been examined. However, considering its construction system, this would be impracticable as the curved forms are the result of bending and pulling together the iron structure, so any damage of this type would demolish the whole structure.

Residents of Batumi, architects and representatives of the public have voiced a protest against launching construction works in the area. Signatures are being collected and a special page has been created on Facebook for open discussion of the matter. Experts advised the representatives of the Hilton Hotels and Resorts to see the Octopus in proper perspective and integrate it into the development of the area. They remarked that the hotel façades decorated with stained glass are in complete harmony with the colourful mosaics of Fantasy Café.

Moreover, the December 6, 2014 joint statement of Tourinvest Ltd and Hilton Batumi reads: “It has never been our intention to demolish Fantasy Café.” The government of Batumi, on the other hand, maintains that the structure is not a Cultural Heritage monument, only a symbol of the city.

An application was submitted to the Cultural Heritage Preservation Agency to grant the site status as an immovable monument. Decision is to be made by the council of experts.

From 2018, the Cafe was under intensive restoration due to its unique architecture. On August 14, 2019, the Octopus reopened.

=== Cultural Heritage Status ===
On July 27, 2020, Cultural Heritage Preservation Agency of Adjara granted the "Octopus" status of an immovable cultural heritage monument.
