= International Parliament for Safety and Peace =

Italy-based intergovernmental organization

The International Parliament (of States) for Safety and Peace (IPSP; Parlamento Mondiale (degli Stati) per la Sicurezza e la Pace), also referred to as the World Organization of the States (WOS), is an intergovernmental organization (IGO) headquartered in Italy. The organization maintains diplomatic representation offices in Portugal, Tunisia, Hong Kong (HKSAR), the Republic of the Congo, the United States, Peru, France, Sri Lanka, Russia, Hungary (1998- dr.Tibor Hidvégi) and Spain. Its stated purpose is the promotion of security and peace.

Its founder and president was Palermo-native Vittorio Maria Busa (1941–2013), self-styled as Viktor Ivan Busà, who also claimed the titles of metropolitan and archbishop of Białystok, president of the Republic of Danzig and the Democratic Republic of Belarus, and Grand Khan of Tartary and Mongolia.

Since the death of Busa in 2013, the organization's original websites were closed and its headquarters moved from Palermo to Rome. For a while, the organization operated under the name World Organization of the States (WOS; L'Organizzazione Mondiale degli Stati), along with International Parliament for (Cooperation) Safety and Peace (IPSP).

There have been disputes concerning the control of the organization. The current president is Eugenio Lai, and the Secretary-General is Alfredo Maiolese, also president of the European Muslims League.

At the beginning of 2025, the IPSP presented its new logo alongside newly appointed representatives from African and Asian countries during a press conference led by its existing leadership.

In the second half of 2025, two additional offices were opened: one in Hong Kong (HKSAR) and one in New York City.

== Interactions with other organizations ==
The International Parliament for Safety and Peace claimed recognition under the Vienna Convention on Diplomatic Relations (1961) and the Vienna Convention on Consular Relations (1963). It had an observer in attendance at the 13th meeting of the Technical Preparatory Committee of the Whole of the United Nations Economic Commission for Africa in Addis Abeba in 1992.

IPSP as an intergovernmental organization (IGO), IPSP issues its own diplomatic passports for official representatives worldwide, as well as service passports for personnel engaged in international missions. These documents are recognized in countries where IPSP operates active development programs or maintains open channels of communication with government institutions and humanitarian agencies.

On 23 July 2014, IPSP registered under a new name, World Organization of the States, as a lobby organization in the EU Transparency Register. In 2015, Atef Tarawneh, the Speaker of Jordan's Lower House received representatives of the Parliament for Safety and Peace for a meeting and signed an agreement. These IPSP people also met Omran al-Zoubi, then Syrian Minister of Information, and a group of businesspeople in the United Arab Emirates.

== Personal associations and trophies ==
IPSP claimed association with many dignitaries in senator, deputy, and executive positions in its global, regional or local chapters. Columnist Steve Blow of The Dallas Morning News has referred to such positions as bodacious credentials. Columnist Bernard Levin of The Times wrote in 1994 that one could join the Parliament for just $140. IPSP reportedly awarded titles of nobility and handed out medals for artistic merit and the pursuit of peace. Among the "senators for life" were president of the Gambia Yahya Jammeh, African-American entrepreneur Charles Steele, Jr., and Kochin-Indian vocalist K. J. Yesudas. President of Gabon Omar Bongo was a "senator for life" and "Grand Chancellor" of the organization. The President of Equatorial Guinea since 1979, Obiang Nguema, received a "Gold Medal for the Liberties of Peoples" from the IPSP in 2003. Nguema was also listed as the organization's vice-president.

Over the years, the following persons were identified as recipients of an IPSP Peace Trophy: Mikhail Gorbachev (1989), Nelson Mandela and Carlos Menem (1995), Lansana Conte (2002), Teodoro Obiang and Hugo Chavez (2004), and Omar Bongo (2006). In 2010 IPSP drew media attention after it secured Kentucky Colonel (2008) and Nebraska Admiral (2010) awards for Yahya Jammeh. IPSP representatives gave Jammeh two additional awards and a letter from Barack Obama that were later described as inauthentic or non-existent. Jammeh further received "Russian" and "German" honorary degrees from members of the IPSP.

== Accreditation of unrecognized schools ==
Several unaccredited institutions of higher education operating inside and outside the United States state that they are accredited or recognized by the International Parliament for Safety and Peace. The IPSP is not recognized as an accreditor by the United States Department of Education (USDE) or the Council for Higher Education Accreditation (CHEA). Without recognition of the "accreditation agency" by USDE and CHEA or an entity in the country where the accreditor is located, such accreditations are "bogus" to the academic community.

The following institutions claimed accreditation or other recognition from IPSP: Alternative Medicines Research Institute, Akamai University, European-American University, Institute of Energy Wellness Studies, International University of Fundamental Studies, Newport University CED, Rutherford University, West Coast University, Weston Reserve University, World Information Distributed University, and the World Organization of Natural Medicine.

Several of the IPSP accredited institutions were identified as diploma mills. The Oman government warns that a student who "receives a degree from a fake educational institution, these certificates will be referred to the Public Prosecution for investigation on charges of forgery". IPSP accredited organizations it identifies as fake schools are Akamai University, West Coast University, Weston Reserve University, and World Information Distributed University. Rutherford University was officially identified as a degree mill by the Oregon Office of Degree Authorization.

The late IPSP leader, Viktor Busà, was listed as the recipient of a 2007 PhD degree in political science and a 2008 "Diploma Grand Doctor of Philosophy in International Diplomacy in Defence of Peace", both from the International University of Fundamental Studies, and was listed as a "Full Professor" for this organization. He was also listed, holding a PhD degree, as a special advisor to Rutherford University México.
