= Bank of Georgia headquarters =

Coordinates: 41°44′8.37″N 44°46′16.36″E

Headquarters of Bank of Georgia
- საქართველოს ბანკის სათავო ოფისი
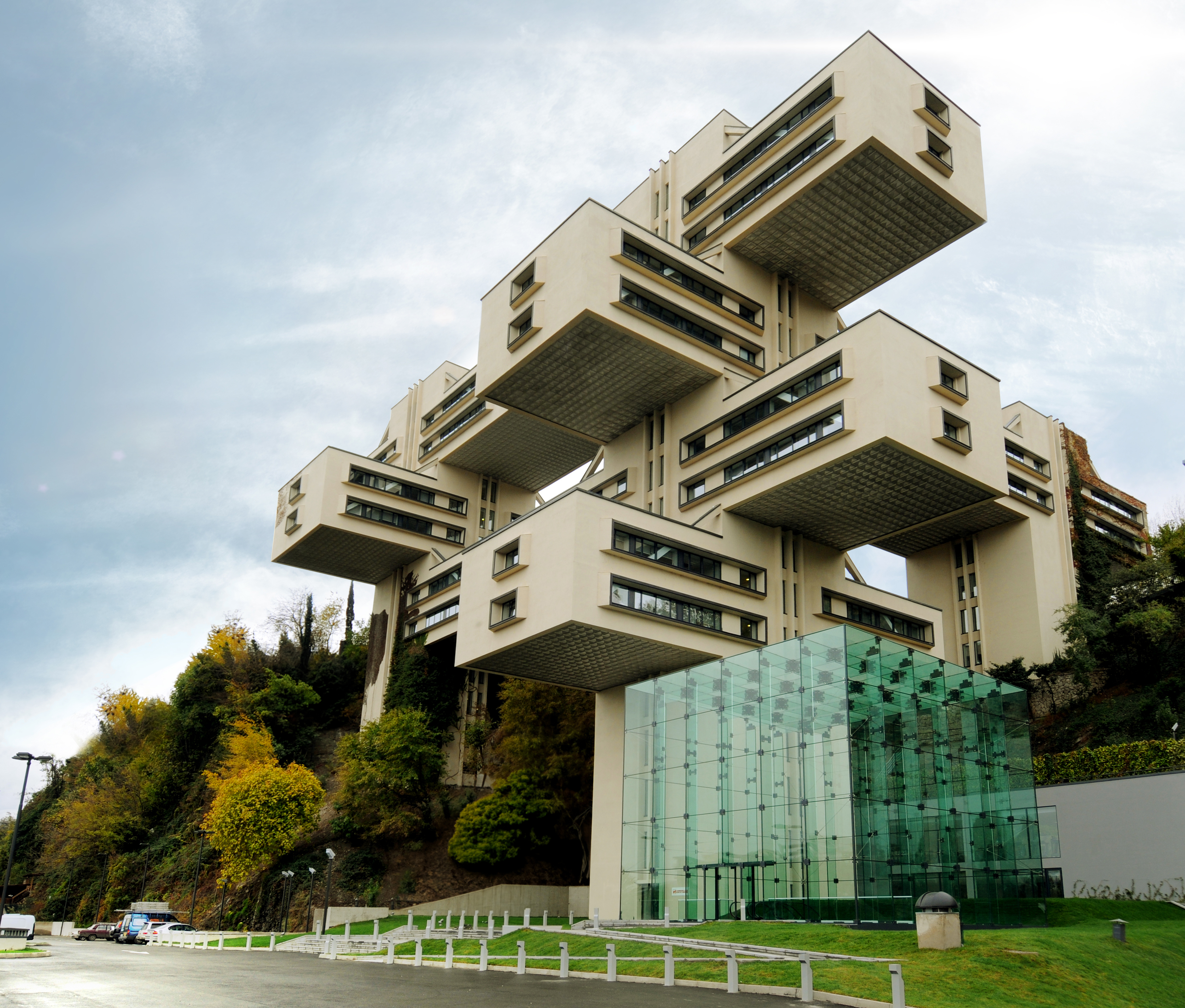
- Interactive map of the Headquarters of Bank of Georgia area
- Former names: Building of the Ministry of highway construction of Georgia

General information
- Status: Completed
- Type: Office building
- Architectural style: Brutalist architecture
- Location: 29a Gagarini Street, Tbilisi, Georgia
- Year built: 1972-1975
- Renovated: 2010-2011
- Cost: RUB 6 million
- Owner: Bank of Georgia

Technical details
- Floor count: 18
- Floor area: 16,000 m^{2} (172,200 sq ft)
- Grounds: 450 m^{2} (4,800 sq ft)

Design and construction
- Architects: George Chakhava, Zurab Jalaghania
- Engineer: Teimuraz Skhilava

Cultural Heritage Monument of Georgia
- Official name: Building of the Ministry of Highways of Georgia
- Designated: October 1, 2007; 18 years ago
- Reference no.: 4013
- Item Number in Cultural Heritage Portal: 4944
- Date of entry in the registry: October 11, 2007; 18 years ago

The Bank of Georgia headquarters (Georgian: საქართველოს ბანკის სათავო ოფისი) is a building in Tbilisi, Georgia. It was designed by architects George Chakhava and Zurab Jalaghania for the Ministry of Highway Construction of the Georgian SSR and finished in 1975. The engineer was Temur Tkhilava. This 18-story building was acquired by the Bank of Georgia in 2007.

== History ==
George Chakhava was Georgia's Deputy Minister of Highway Construction in the 1970s. Therefore, he was both the client and the lead architect of this project. He could choose the site location best suited for the design himself. The building costs were 6 million roubles. It was completed in 1975.

In 2007 the building was acquired by the Bank of Georgia. In the same year it was also conferred an Immovable Monument status under the National Monuments Acts. In 2009 a renovation and extension to 15,600 m^{2} was planned but not implemented.

In July 2010 the building was the site of a contemporary art exhibition, "Frozen Moments: Architecture Speaks Back". Frozen Moments was a project organized by the Other Space Foundation and the Laura Palmer Foundation. The building was turned over to a week of cross-platform installations, performances, talks and activities that address the building and a constellation of political, economic, aesthetic and architectural associations. The project was financed by the Polish Ministry of Culture, the City of Warsaw and the Culture Program of the EC.

From 2010 to 2011, a new main entrance and underground lobby were constructed, and its interior was completely renovated. It now has a total area of 13,500 m^{2}.

The building was briefly featured in the 2021 film Fast and Furious 9.

=== Architect ===
George Chakhava (გიორგი ჩახავა) studied architecture at the State Polytechnical University in Tbilisi and graduated in 1949. Since then he has worked as an architect with his own studio and realized projects in Georgia as well as in Ukraine, Uzbekistan, Tajikistan, Afghanistan and Latvia. The inspiration for his architecture was "the unique nature of my country with its individuality and beauty of each region in harmony with mountain villages", the design is also greatly influenced by El Lissitzky and Suprematism.

Chakhava received several honors and awards. In 1983 he received the State Prize of the USSR Council of Ministers. The Georgian Union of Architects also awarded him with the Special Honor in Architecture. In 1991, he became an Honored Member of the International Academy of the Architecture of the Oriental Countries. Chakhava died on 25 August 2007.

== Design ==
The wooded site lies in the outskirts of Tbilisi at the river Kura River. It has a steep slope, declining from west to east. Big parts of the building are lifted off the ground, the landscape runs through beneath. The structure is visible from far, three major roads leading from Tbilisi to the north pass the site. The building can be entered from both sites, at the higher and lower end.

The structure consists of a monumental grid of interlocking concrete forms. Five horizontal parts with two stories each seem to be stapled on top of each other. Three parts are oriented at an east–west axis, at a right angle to the slope, two are north–south oriented, along the slope. The structure rests on and hangs from three cores. They contain the vertical circulation elements like stairs and elevators. The highest core has 18 stories. The building has a floor area of 13,500 m^{2}.

=== Architecture ===
The design is based on a concept named Space City method (Georgian patent certificate #1538). The idea is to use and cover less ground and give the space below the building back to nature. The architect's reference was a forest: the cores are like the trunk, the horizontal parts the crowns. Between the earth and crowns there is a lot of free space for other living beings, which create one harmonious world with the forest. The Space City method is based on the same principle. This is meant to create an experience of well-being and comfort.

The concept that the landscape or nature "flows" through under the building was used by other architects, too. Le Corbusier worked theoretically on the "house on pilotis" and realized this idea for example from 1947 on in the Unité d'Habitation. Frank Lloyd Wright used a similar idea at Fallingwater in 1935. Glenn Murcutt used the proverb "touch this earth lightly" literally in some of his designs. A current example is the Musée du quai Branly by Jean Nouvel in Paris, where a garden lies beneath a building.

The design goes back to ideas of the Russian constructivists from the 1920s. The architect El Lissitzky designed with his horizontal skyscrapers (Wolkenbügel) 1924 a structure that looks very similar. He also divided the cores and office areas in vertical and horizontal elements as an antithesis to the American concept of the skyscraper.

The style can be called "post-constructivist" and it is one of the best examples of this architectural concept in the city. Based on the use of fairfaced concrete and the sharp, geometrical volumes, the building can also be considered as part of the Brutalism movement. The concept of the space city has strong connections to Structuralism. Between Brutalism and Structuralism similar buildings were also built in other countries, for example the Yamanashi Communication Centre in Kofu by Kenzo Tange or Habitat 67 by Moshe Safdie, both finished in 1967.

German author Udo Kultermann also sees a formal connection to the user of the building. The structure represents in his opinion the internal use by the formal reference to streets and bridges. Describing the building, The New York Times architecture critic Nikolai Ouroussoff said, "Rising on an incline between two highways, the building’s heavy cantilevered forms reflect the Soviet-era penchant for heroic scale. Yet they also relate sensitively to their context, celebrating the natural landscape that flows directly underneath the building. The composition of interlocking forms, conceived as a series of bridges, brings to mind the work of the Japanese Metabolists of the late ’60s and early ’70s, proof that Soviet architects weren’t working in an intellectual vacuum."

=== Design controversy ===
The design is alleged to be stolen from a building that was planned but not built in the Prague district of Košíře, by Czech architect Karel Prager, who also designed the former Federal Assembly building in Prague. There is a version of some of the structural ideas of this project in the "Tree of Life" (Árbol de la vida) building in Lecherias, Venezuela, by Venezuelan architect Fruto Vivas.

== See also ==
- List of Brutalist structures
