= Warren National University =

American unaccredited private distance learning university (1984–2009)

- Former name: Kennedy-Western University
- Type: Unaccredited private distance learning university
- Active: 1984–2009
- Faculty: 120
- Students: 30,000 total from 1984 to 2005
- Location: Cheyenne, Wyoming, United States
- Website: www.wnuedu.com (index) at the Internet Archive

Warren National University, previously known as Kennedy-Western University, was an unaccredited private distance learning university that claimed to offer undergraduate and graduate degrees in the United States from 1984 to 2009. It has been described by federal investigators, Congressional testimony, and news sources as a diploma mill Its administrative offices were located in Agoura Hills, California.

== History ==
Warren National University was established as Kennedy-Western University in California in 1984. Its founder was Paul Saltman. The name was officially changed to Warren National University on January 1, 2007. According to the institution, the new name was selected in honor of the first governor of Wyoming, Francis E. Warren, and reflects the university's strong ties to the state of Wyoming. In 2003 the Encyclopedia of Distributed Learning cited Kennedy-Western University as an example of an unaccredited, profit-making online university that had "achieved reported economic success."

Over the university's history, it had offices in Hawaii, Idaho, and finally to Wyoming, while keeping headquarters in California until December 2007. As of December 14, 2007, WNU closed its administrative offices in Agoura Hills, California, centralizing its operations in Wyoming.

In 2002 The Chronicle of Higher Education reported that KWU was licensed in California up to 1991, "But Kennedy-Western chose not to renew its license after California enacted the Private Postsecondary and Vocational Education Reform Act, a 1989 law that aimed to rid the state of diploma mills." In the same article the Chronicle quoted the school's director of admissions as saying the new California regulations would not have permitted KWU "to offer college credit for work experience and a more flexible self-paced model."

WNU submitted an initial application for accreditation by the Higher Learning Commission in 2008. The following year, however, WNU released an announcement that "Warren National's plans to earn affiliated status with the HLC were adversely impacted by the limitations of a tightening credit market and made more difficult by the increased costs of daily operation. ...Warren National University is therefore required by Wyoming law to cease operation." As a result, WNU was not accredited.

In August 2008, WNU announced that it was suspending new student admissions and reactivation of students in order to focus resources on current students. On January 30, 2009, WNU announced that its attempt to achieve accreditation had failed. Therefore, in compliance with Wyoming state law it would cease operations on March 31, 2009. It was also mentioned that future university registrar services would be provided by Preston University.

On June 5, 2009, a civil suit was filed by 67 former students from 27 states alleging that WNU had misrepresented itself to the students.

After the school closed, former students who took out loans to pay Warren National University learned that their degree was not accepted by some government or state employment that required licenses.

== Licensing and accreditation status ==
Warren National University was registered with the Wyoming Department of Education under W.S. 21-2-401 through 21-2-407. This registration allowed the university to legally conduct business in the state. However, WNU was never accredited by any higher education accreditation body recognized in the United States.

The Chronicle of Higher Education stated in 2002, "Kennedy-Western University has a history of flirting with accreditation but failing to earn it." In 2001 Warren National announced it was considering applying to the Distance Education and Training Council (DETC) for accreditation. However, while DETC's approval from the U.S. Department of Education authorized it to accredit institutions that award doctorates, WNU did not pursue DETC accreditation.

As a condition of registration in Wyoming, the institution had to meet standards contained in "Article 4: Private School Licensing." One such requirement, which took effect in July 2006, was that a school must either be accredited or be in the process of becoming accredited by a higher education accrediting organization recognized by the U.S. Department of Education. To continue operating in Wyoming, Warren National University applied for accreditation from the North Central Association of Colleges and Schools, the regional accreditation agency serving the state. The accreditation process was expected to take several years. According to WNU, the school achieved "eligibility status" for accreditation in December 2007.

The Higher Learning Commission of the North Central Commission scheduled an "initial candidacy" visit by an evaluation team on October 13–15, 2008, another required step toward accreditation. As of January 27, 2009, WNU was no longer listed by the Higher Learning Commission as "Applying" for accreditation, but instead as "No Status." On January 30, 2009, the WNU website explained that the evaluation visit did not go well and the recommendation was that the accreditation process should be terminated. Therefore, WNU withdrew their accreditation application. On January 30, 2009, Warren National University announced that their attempt to achieve accreditation had failed and that they would cease operating on March 31, 2009.

== Academics ==
Warren National University offered unaccredited bachelor's and master's degrees in business administration, computer science, humanities, management information systems, and health administration, as well as a Doctor of Business Administration degree.

In 2004, Kennedy-Western said, "By leveraging the power of the internet, Kennedy-Western has refined the academic process and opened up countless opportunities to adult learners. And they used Jones e-Global Library."

Kennedy-Western instructors said their students often used the same textbooks and took exams as rigorous as those offered in traditional classes.

=== Faculty ===
In 2007 a Warren National official said the institution had between 135 and 150 faculty members. According to WNU spokesmen and the school's website, 80% of the academic faculty hold doctoral degrees from accredited institutions and the remainder hold master's degrees from accredited institutions. In 2002 WNU declined to tell The Chronicle of Higher Education the number of faculty, the method of compensation, the proportion of faculty that is full-time or the ownership of the institution. At least 22 WNU instructors were full-time faculty at other state and private academic institutions, primarily associate and assistant professors in business, computer science, or engineering at state universities. These part-time WNU faculty were paid on a piecework basis, receiving $25 to grade a paper, $200 to develop a course, and $40 per hour to answer students' questions. Some of these faculty members declined to discuss their WNU work with The Chronicle of Higher Education with the about their work for WNU due to concern that their regular employers or their colleagues would disapprove of it.

== Controversy ==
=== GAO investigation ===
An investigation was conducted in 2003–2004 by the U.S. General Accounting Office (GAO) to determine whether the federal government had paid for degrees from diploma mills and other unaccredited postsecondary schools. Investigators determined that the federal government employed 463 individuals with degrees from unaccredited institutions including Kennedy-Western University. Senator Collins presented the GAO report to the Committee on Governmental Affairs, of which she was the Chair and ranking Republican.

Witness testimony was provided during the same hearing by Coast Guard Lieutenant Commander Claudia Gelzer, who was assigned as a staff aide to the committee and enrolled at Kennedy-Western as part of the committee's investigation of diploma mills. Gelzer testified that she enrolled at Kennedy-Western undercover Kennedy-Western gave her life experience credit towards a master's in environmental engineering. Kennedy-Western waived 43% of the course credit required for the degree based only on her application and descriptions of prior coursework and military training. She testified that Kennedy-Western didn't check any of her claimed work experience. With 16 hours of effort she was able to earn 40% of the total remaining coursework required for her master's. "As for my first-hand experience with Kennedy-Western courses and passing the tests, I found that basic familiarity with the textbook was all I needed. I was able to find exam answers without having read a single chapter of the text. ... As for what I learned, the answer is very little."

The university's Director of Corporate Communications, David Gering, stated to The Oregonian, "We clearly believe that we are not a diploma mill and have an academically rigorous program." Lewis M. Phelps, a spokesman for Kennedy-Western University, said the online university was unfairly tarnished in the report. "The basic equation GAO seems to have come up with is 'no accreditation, no good,' " Phelps said. "We don't think that's valid."

=== Oregon lawsuit ===
In July 2004, Warren National University filed a lawsuit on behalf of three former students, challenging an Oregon law that made it illegal for résumés used in connection with employment (including job applications) in the state to list degrees from institutions that are not accredited or recognized by the state as legitimate. In the suit, WNU asserted that the Oregon law violated its graduates' constitutional rights. In December 2004, Warren National and Oregon reached an out-of-court settlement in the case. Under the terms of the settlement, Oregon agreed to revise its law, allowing graduates of unaccredited schools to list an unaccredited degree on a résumé. The statutory revision was enacted in 2005. In the settlement, the Oregon State Office of Degree Authorization (ODA) also agreed to refrain from referring to the school as a "diploma mill" and the state attorney general's office agreed to provide ODA personnel with a training session on law related to defamation. However, Oregon still does not allow WNU degrees to be used for governmental employment or for professional licenses, because the ODA determined that the institution does not meet standard academic requirements as specified by Oregon statute ORS 348.609(1).

== Notable alumni ==
- Michelle Kidani, vice chair of the Hawaii State Senate Higher Education Committee

== See also ==
- Electronic learning
- List of unaccredited institutions of higher learning
- Virtual university
