= George Chakhava =

Georgian architect

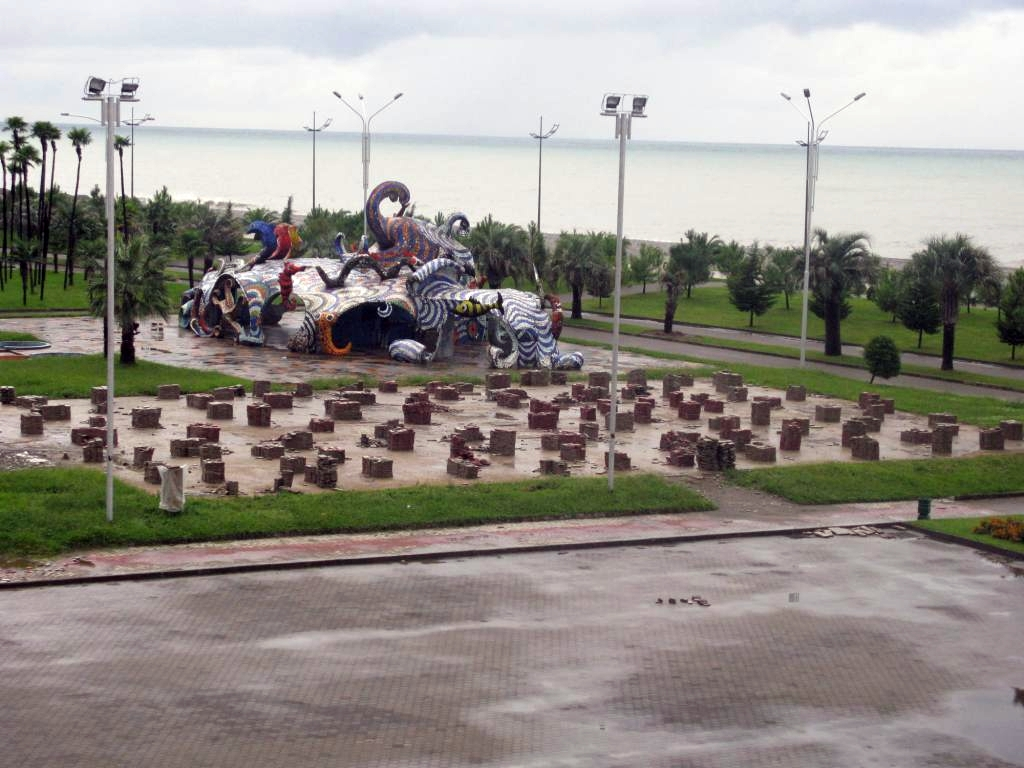
Cafe Fantasy, Batumi

Bank of Georgia headquarters (2015)

George Chakhava (Georgian: გიორგი ჩახავა, 1923–2007) was an architect from Georgia, best known for co-designing the Bank of Georgia headquarters in Tbilisi.

Chakhava was born in Tbilisi in 1923 and earned a bachelor's degree in architecture from the Georgian Technical University in 1949.

The Bank of Georgia headquarters in Tbilisi was originally built for the Ministry of Highway Construction of the Georgian SSR and finished in 1975, at a time when Chakhava was Georgia's Deputy Minister of Highway Construction. It became the headquarters of the Bank of Georgia in 2007.

Chakhava co-designed Cafe Fantasy in Batumi, which opened in 1975 but has been closed since 2000. The Octopus has since been restored and is back in use as a café.

In 1983, Chakhava received the USSR State Prize.
