= Didube-Chugureti District =

Administrative district in Georgia

- Tbilisi district
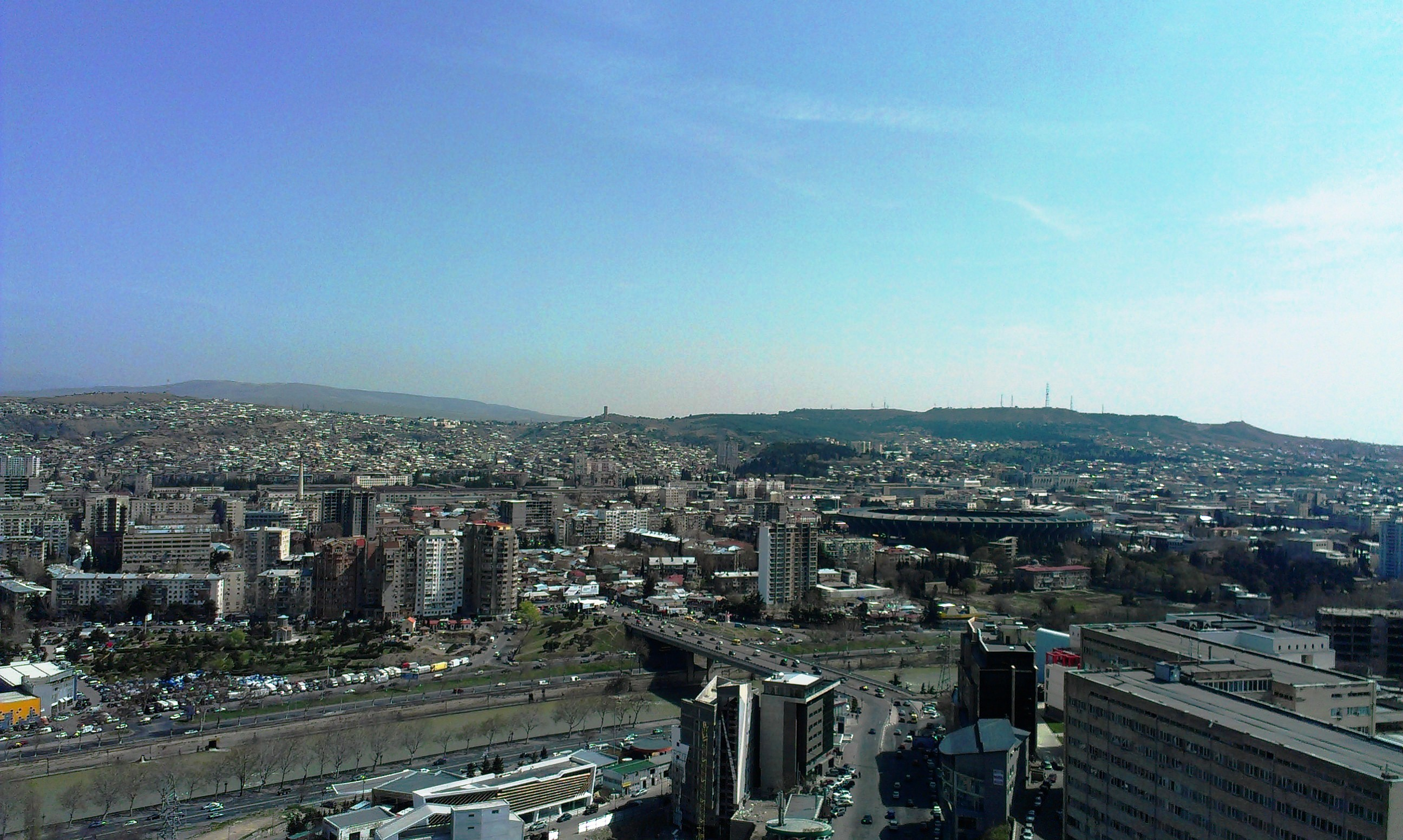
- Interactive map of Didube-Chugureti District
- Location within Tbilisi
- Coordinates: 41°42′40″N 44°48′00″E

Government
  - Body: Tbilisi Sakrebulo
- Time zone: UTC+4 (Georgian Time)
- Website: www.tbilisi.gov.ge

Didube-Chugureti is an administrative district (raioni) in Tbilisi, capital of Georgia.
