= Rutherford University =

Online private institution

- Motto: Longevity, Advancement, Wisdom
- Type: unaccredited private university identified as a degree mill
- Active: 1993–2009
- Chancellor: Abdul Hassam
- President: William Weston
- Dean: Abdul Hassam
- VP/Registrar: Nasrat/Nusri Hassam/Kassam
- Location: 28-29 Dzeliwe Street, Mbabane, Eswatini; British Columbia, Canada; Hong Kong, China; Mexico; South Africa; Evanston, Wyoming
- Website: rutherford.edu

Rutherford University, previously doing business as Senior University International and Stratford International University, was an unaccredited private institution that offered degrees online. It operated from 1993 through 2009.

The Oregon Office of Degree Authorization had labeled Rutherford University a degree mill.

== Recognition ==
On its website Rutherford claimed to be accredited by the International States Parliament, an organization based in Palermo, Sicily. Rutherford also claimed to be recognized by the government of the African nation of Swaziland, but this was denied by the nation's minister of education and other education officials in early 2008. Subsequently, the claim of recognition by Swaziland was removed from the university website and returned.

The Oregon Office of Degree Authorization stated that Rutherford University had "no authority to issue degrees." The British Columbia government believed that the school was operating unlawfully from British Columbia.

== History ==
Rutherford was established in 1993 as Senior University International in Evanston, Wyoming. Its owner or co-owner was Lester Carr, who was also a co-owner of Columbia Pacific University and had served as president of Columbia Commonwealth University in Rock Springs, Wyoming. Senior University International was not allowed to continue its operations from Wyoming after it did not meet the requirements of the Wyoming government.

Subsequently, the school officially operated from British Columbia. According to Hoovers it had annual sales of 600,000 dollars with seven employees in Vancouver, but other reports stated that it operated from Richmond. Richmond was the place of residence of Rutherford senior Abdul Sultan Hassam, Vancouver was the residence of Leslie Carr. In March 2006 Rutherford was instructed to stop enrolling students from British Columbia.

In 2003, a "Rutherford University" was identified as planning to develop a new campus in New South Wales, Australia.

In 2005 the Dutch foundation "Counselling Netherlands" in Heteren started a Bachelor of Arts in Multidisciplinary Counselling program for 10.000 euro over four years through Rutherford University. However, in 2008 it was discovered that the school was not accredited as Counselling Netherlands had claimed.

In 2007 the university claimed to have its headquarters in Mbabane, Swaziland, However, its corporate headquarters remained in Evanston, Wyoming. As of mid-2008, only an address in Swaziland was provided by the institution. A telephone number in Swaziland was removed from the website after the operator had stated not to know Rutherford University. The Oregon Office of Degree Authorization reports listed Wyoming, British Columbia, Swaziland, South Africa, and China as geographic locations with which Rutherford University has been associated.

In June 2009, all the information on the sub-pages was no longer available from the organization's website. The website of "Rutherford University Mexico" was accessible after being temporarily unavailable, but by September 2009 the domain was no longer connected.

== See also ==
- Diploma mill
- Accreditation mill
