= National Bank of Georgia =

Central Bank of Georgia

National Bank of Georgia საქართველოს ეროვნული ბანკი

- National Bank of Georgia
- Central bank of: Georgia
- Headquarters: 1, Zviad Gamsakhurdia Named Right Bank, Tbilisi, Georgia
- Established: December 31, 1919; 106 years ago (as State Bank of the DRG); 1991; 35 years ago (as National Bank of Georgia)
- Ownership: 100% state ownership
- Governing body: Board of the Bank
- Governor: Natia Turnava
- Currency: Georgian lari GEL (ISO 4217)
- Reserves: 4 116 million USD
- Bank rate: 7.5%
- Website: www.nbg.gov.ge

The National Bank of Georgia (Georgian: საქართველოს ეროვნული ბანკი, Sakartvelos Erovnuli Bank’i) is the central bank of Georgia. Its status is defined by the Constitution of Georgia. According to the Constitution of Georgia, it is independent of state control, and is tasked with ensuring price stability. The supreme body of the National Bank is its council, composed of seven members. The chairman of the council is the President of the National Bank. The council, in addition to the chairman, is composed of two Vice Presidents and other members. Members of the NBG Council are elected for the seven-year term by the Parliament of Georgia, by the majority of the total number of its members, upon the nomination of the President of Georgia.

== History ==
The National Bank of Georgia was established on the basis of the Georgian Republican Bank of the State Bank of the USSR in 1991.

Georgia's first central bank was established in 1919. Its first manager was Yason Lordkipanidze, who headed the bank from 1919 to 1924. In 1991, after the collapse of the Soviet Union, the regulator began to function as an independent institution. Then, by decision of the Supreme Council of Georgia, the National Bank of Georgia was established on the basis of the Soviet financial and credit structure.

== Presidents ==
- Jason Lordkipanidze – Governor of the State Bank of Georgia, July 1920 – February 1921
- Gia Topuria, October 1991 – January 1992
- Vazha Djindjikhadze, January 1992 – March 1992
- Nodar Kakulia, April 1992 – November 1992
- Demur Dvalishvili, November 1992 – October 1993
- Nodar Javakhishvili, October 1993 – March 1998
- Irakli Managadze, March 1998 – March 2005
- Roman Gotsiridze, March 2005 – October 2007
- David Amaglobeli, October 2007 – February 2009
- Giorgi Kadagidze, February 2009 – February 2016
- Koba Gvenetadze, March 2016 – March 2023
- Natia Turnava, June 2023 – Present

== Constitution of Georgia ==
=== Article 95 ===
1. The National Bank of Georgia shall ensure the functioning of the monetary system of Georgia to provide the price stability and supports the financial sector's efficient functioning
2. The National Bank is the bank of all banks, and the banker and fiscal agent of the Georgian Government.
3. The National Bank shall be independent in its activities. Its rights and obligations, procedures of activities, as well as guarantee of its independence shall be determined under the Organic law.
4. The name and unit of money shall be determined by law. The National Bank shall have the sole right to issue money.

=== Article 96 ===
1. The highest body of the National Bank of Georgia is the Council of the National Bank, whose members shall be approved by the Parliament, by the majority of the total number of deputies upon the nomination of the President, for the period of seven years. The members of the Council may be dismissed only upon the decision of the Parliament, in accord with Article 64 of this Constitution.
2. The President of the National Bank shall be appointed from the Council members, and relieved of his/her duties by the President of Georgia, upon the nomination of the Council of the National Bank.
3. The National Bank shall be accountable to the Parliament and submit a report on its activities on the annual basis.

== Monetary policy rate and committee decisions ==
Monetary Policy Committee's monetary policy decisions and underlying reasons are published on the website of the National Bank of Georgia after the end of each monetary policy committee meeting.

Monetary Policy Rate
Date	Change (Percentage Points)	New Rate (%)
May 22, 2024	-0.25	8
March 13, 2024	-0.75	8.25
January 31, 2024	-0.5	9
December 20, 2023	-0.5	9.5
October 25, 2023	0	10

== See also ==
- List of central banks
- List of financial supervisory authorities by country
