= Newport International University =

Unaccredited college in the United States

Coordinates: 34.1780°N 118.6054°W

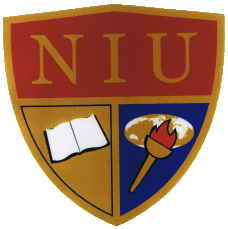
- Motto in English: Dedicated to Global Education
- Type: For-profit
- Established: 2005
- President: Jay Askari
- Faculty: 35
- Location: West Hills, California, United States
- Campus: Urban
- Colors: Blue, Burgundy, Gold
- Nickname: NIU
- Website: niu-college.com
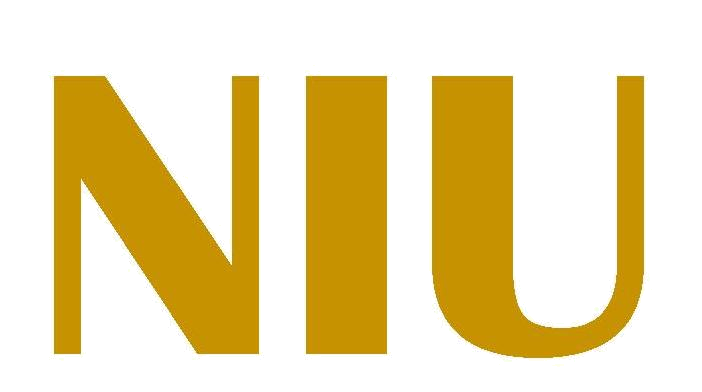

Newport International University, doing business as NIU College, is an unaccredited for-profit college in West Hills, California. Founded in 2005 in Lancaster, California, it moved to Los Angeles in July 2012 and changed its name from TechExcel to NIU College.

== History ==
NIU College was founded in 1976 by Ted Dalton in Newport Beach, California. In 2002, the school was relocated to Wyoming under new management to operate under a permissive state higher education law, where it operated in accordance with the laws of the state of Wyoming and under the rules and regulations of the Wyoming Department of Education. In April 2009 a meeting of the NIU Board of Governors was held in the NIU Headquarters building in Laramie, Wyoming and decisions were made to move the facilities to Hayward, California. To accomplish this move, it was further decided that Newport International University would end its operations in Wyoming and would voluntarily return its license to the Wyoming Department of Education. In October 2009, new legislation was passed requiring all private postsecondary schools, new or current, to be properly registered/renewed and approved by the state of California. Under new management in 2011, Newport International University began the process for approval by the Bureau for Private Postsecondary Education (BPPE). In 2014, Newport International University received BPPE approval to operate and educate in the state of California in the fields of business and psychology.

NIU was incorporated in Wyoming in 2002 and formerly operated there under a permissive state higher education law. After the state enacted a new law in 2006 requiring higher education institutions to be accredited or seek accreditation in order to remain in the state, NIU filed a lawsuit challenging the constitutionality of the new state law. The Wyoming Supreme Court upheld the law in a June 2008 ruling, and in April 2009 NIU relinquished its Wyoming registration and announced plans to merge with Newport University in California.

== University maturation ==
In 2003, Newport International University was split into two sectors. The first would become Newport University, the sector of the university designated for local students. The second would become Newport International University for the international sector of the university. The schools were acquired as separate entities. All Newport International University logos, trademarks, licenses, publications, and website became the sole property of Newport International University.

== University campus ==
The campus is located at 6700 Fallbrook Avenue, West Hills, CA 91307, near one of the busiest intersections in the San Fernando Valley. The campus is a short distance to highways 101, 118, and 405.

While based in Wyoming, NIU operated educational programs in about 14 countries around the world.
