= Preston University (United States) =

University closed its operations in the United States

Preston University was an unaccredited private university in the United States based in Los Angeles, California.

About 30 affiliated campuses throughout the world were listed by Preston in 2009. Degree programs from associate to Ph.D. were offered. As of August 2012, the Oregon Office of Degree Authorization reported that the university was operated from Pakistan, had formerly operated in Wyoming and Alabama in the United States, had been active in Nepal in 2009, also had a presence in Dubai, in the United Arab Emirates and used several different institutional names in several world regions.

== History ==
Preston University states that it was established in 1984 and that its first United States campus was established in 1994. As of 1998, the school was based in Cheyenne, Wyoming, and operated additional campuses in Africa and Asia, including four campuses in Karachi and two in other parts of Pakistan. At that time there were 30 full-time faculty and 30 part-time instructors working in Cheyenne, but most of Preston's revenue came from the campuses in Pakistan.

Preston faced challenges in 1998 when the U.S. government imposed trade embargoes on Pakistan in 1998 after that nation tested nuclear weapons, but by 2001, Preston's chancellor, Jerry Haenisch, told the Chronicle of Higher Education that Preston had 30 "affiliated" campuses in 19 countries and about 8,000 students, mostly in Pakistan. Preston offered classroom instruction in Cheyenne as well as distance education. As of 2001, about 18 students were reported to be taking classes at what was then Preston's official main campus in Cheyenne.

In 2001, The Chronicle of Higher Education reported that it had randomly selected two of Preston University's listed faculty members and inquired about their relationship with the university. They both said that they were not associated with Preston University and did not know that they were on the school's faculty list. A Preston official acknowledged that only 15 out of 49 listed faculty actually worked for the university. Haenisch explained that over half of the faculty on their list had applied for jobs at Preston but had never actually been employed. They were listed in case a student was interested in the discipline the professor specialized in. Haenisch admitted that the practice was misleading and would be discontinued.

In 2005, Haenisch said he was hoping the Wyoming legislature would pass laws that would allow the setting up an international accrediting agency to allow for expansion of Preston's as well as other schools online enrollment and bring more students to Wyoming; State Superintendent Jim McBride said he was opposed to any such law. Haenisch had also voiced his concern about the potential for illegitimate or degree mill-type schools being licensed in the state of Wyoming.

=== Move to Alabama ===
In 2007, the state of Wyoming started requiring that higher education institutions operating in the state must be accredited. Because Preston remained unaccredited it moved its operations to Alabama.

In February 2008 the Preston University website listed at least 30 affiliated campuses.

In August 2008, The Straits Times reported that Preston University was a degree mill from which some leading businessmen in Singapore held PhD degrees. The Straits Times' assertions about Preston were strongly disputed by Jerry Haenisch, Preston's chancellor, who confirmed that the university had no accreditation from any US Department of Education approved body but said that the school was "absolutely not" a "degree mill". Haenisch said that careless inclusion of Preston University in the sensational reporting about degree mills is inexcusable and demanded that the newspaper apologize for publishing articles based on superficial research and for repeating erroneous assumptions and untrue innuendo from other writers. He said that the university was "legally licensed and authorized to operate by the state of Alabama". Finally he took issue with The Straits Times' statement that the move from Wyoming to Alabama was a sign of disrepute. He said the move was made because Alabama is more populated than Wyoming and has much greater support resources. He also pointed out that the US Department of Education and the Council for Higher Education Accreditation both had accreditation was given until December 2008.

Preston University's license to operate legally in Alabama expired on December 1, 2008. The rules set by the Alabama Chancellor of Education, effective on October 1, 2008, require all private schools to become accredited. Section IV, B, 3, a, 4. states: “All privately licensed degree granting, post-secondary educational institutions must be accredited by an accrediting agency recognized by the United States Department of Education (USDE), the Council for Higher Education Accreditation (CHEA), be a candidate for accreditation or in process of application for accreditation as determined and monitored by the Department. This requirement becomes effective beginning October 1, 2008. Preston University was listed as Accredited till December 2008 as it satisfied all the necessary requirements.

Until December 2016, Preston University's website stated that it no longer offered enrollment in academic programs in its distance education division and that the university had ceased operations in the USA. However, past students and graduates who required copies of diplomas, official transcripts, and certifications could contact the Registrar's Office.

== Fairmount International University ==
After Preston moved from Wyoming to Alabama in 2007, Preston chancellor Jerry Haenisch announced that a new distance education school, Fairmount International University, would offer an online business program from Preston's former Cheyenne offices. Preston and Fairmount were both to be owned by Abdul Basit, who served as president of both institutions, and Jerry Haenisch would serve as chancellor of both. However, Fairmount International University was not established and does not operate in Wyoming.

== See also ==
- Preston University, Pakistan
