= List of business schools in Switzerland =

List of business schools in Switzerland. Public schools on the list are all accredited higher education institution (AAQ), part of Universities in Switzerland. Private business schools are not accredited higher education institutions, but they are able to legitimately execute their functions in Switzerland by virtue of the principle of economic freedom. They may also use a name that is not subject to an accreditation requirement. However, this does not mean that the Swiss authorities recognise the studies offered, nor the examinations passed nor the qualifications issued.

== Public business schools ==
| Canton | School International Business Academy of Switzerland | City |
|---|---|---|
| Basel | Faculty of Business and Economics, University of Basel | Basel |
| Bern | Faculty of Business, Economics and Social Sciences, University of Bern | Bern |
| Geneva | Faculty Geneva School of Economics and Management (GSEM), University of Geneva | Geneva |
| Grisons | Swiss School of Tourism and Hospitality | Chur |
| Lucerne | Business School and Management, Lucerne University of Applied Sciences and Arts | Lucerne and Rotkreuz |
| Lucerne | SHL Schweizerische Hotelfachschule Luzern | Lucerne |
| St. Gallen | University of St. Gallen | St. Gallen |
| Ticino | Faculty of Economics, Università della Svizzera italiana | Lugano |
| Vaud | HEC Lausanne | Lausanne |
| Vaud | École hôtelière de Lausanne | Lausanne |
| Zürich | Zurich University of Applied Sciences in Business Administration | Zürich |
| Zürich | School of Management and Law, Zurich University of Applied Sciences/ZHAW | Winterthur |

== Private business schools ==
| Canton | School | City |
|---|---|---|
| Basel-City | Basel School of Business | Basel |
| Geneva | Geneva Business School | Geneva |
| Geneva | EU Business School | Geneva |
| Geneva | Geneva School of Business and Economics | Geneva |
| Geneva | Institut de Finance et Management | Geneva |
| Geneva | International University in Geneva | Geneva |
| Geneva | Rushford Business School | Geneva |
| Geneva | Swiss School of Business and Management | Geneva |
| Geneva | UBIS University | Geneva |
| Lucerne | Business and Hotel Management School – Switzerland | Lucerne |
| Lucerne | HTMi | Sörenberg |
| Lucerne | IMI International Management Institute Switzerland | Kastanienbaum |
| Lucerne | International School of Business Management | Lucerne and Weggis |
| Lucerne | School of Business and Trade | Lucerne |
| Lucerne | Swiss Institute for Management and Hospitality | Weggis |
| Valais | Cesar Ritz Colleges | Brig |
| Valais | Culinary Arts Academy Switzerland | Le Bouveret |
| Valais | Les Roches International School of Hotel Management | Crans-Montana |
| Vaud | Swiss School of Applied Sciences for Economics and Management (Swiss-SASEM) | Lausanne |
| Vaud | American Institute of Applied Sciences in Switzerland | La Tour-de-Peilz |
| Vaud | Glion Institute of Higher Education | Glion |
| Vaud | Helvetic Business School | Vevey |
| Vaud | HIM Business School | Montreux |
| Vaud | International Institute for Management Development | Lausanne |
| Vaud | Sustainability Management School | Gland |
| Vaud | Swiss Hotel Management School | Caux and Leysin |
| Vaud | Montreux Institute of Business Development | Montreux |
| Vaud | Swiss Montreux Business School | Montreux |
| Vaud | Swiss School of Higher Education (SSHE) | Montreux |
| Zug | Monarch Business School Switzerland | Zug |
| Zug | European Institute of Management and Technology | Zug |
| Zug | Swiss Management Center | Zug |
| Zürich | GSBA Zurich | Zürich |
| Zürich | SBS Swiss Business School | Zürich |
| Zürich | Swiss School of Business Research | Zürich |
| Zürich | International Business Academy of Switzerland | Zürich |
| Zürich | Swiss School of Management | Zürich |
| Zürich | Zurich Elite Business School (ZEBS) | Zürich |
| Zürich | Boston Business School | Zürich |
| Zürich | Klubschule Migros | Zurich |

== See also ==
- Diploma mills
- Accreditation mill
- Educational accreditation
- List of hospitality management schools in Switzerland
- List of unaccredited institutions of higher learning
- List of unrecognized accreditation associations of higher learning
- Unaccredited institutions of higher learning
- Résumé fraud
