= List of institutions not listed as Accredited Swiss Higher Education Institutions according to HEdA =

Private business enterprises set up as higher education institutions claiming a form of accreditation with no official ties to local governments ministry fall under the category of unaccredited institutions of higher education (uHEI). Said institutions can award private degrees in accordance with the Swiss government under the HEdA. Such degrees do not confer entitlement upon the holder for which the Swiss authorities will recognize the studies offered, examinations passed, or the qualifications issued by said type of institutions.

== Institutional (academic) accreditation ==
Institutional accreditation in Switzerland is granted by the Swiss Accreditation Council after a review by the Swiss Agency of Accreditation and Quality Assurance (AAQ). Such Confederation-accreditation grants the institution in Switzerland the right to call (use) itself a University as well receiving state grants. (Student visa rights, accommodation) Government-established Universities are institutionally accredited through the accreditation council or Ministry of Education. Some programs, especially medical fields like pharmacy and medicine, must be programmatically accredited through the accreditation council.

== Private and programmatic accreditation ==
Business schools can go to private programmatic Institutions to improve the level of their programs and quality offered to students. The so-called triple accreditation is often seen as the highest quality certification for business schools. The most well-regarded accreditation agencies are AACSB in the United States, AMBA in the United Kingdom, and EQUIS in the European Union, albeit they all accredit schools in other world regions. Many other accreditation agencies exist, but their accreditation is less well-regarded and may sometimes approach being an accreditation mill. In the accreditation guide, membership and accreditation from private accrediting agencies (IACBE, ACBSP, AACSB) do not fall under the same level of recognition. Private programmatic accreditation does not guarantee any acceptance for the degrees, titles, or qualifications awarded by uHEI; those still fall to the respected MoE the uHEI are registered.

Some private uHEI grant dual degree programs with a partnered university. The degrees from such partnerships are properly recognized if the referenced University is recognized from the respective Ministry of Education.

== Scholarship and visa ==
The Swiss Government does not provide any official support for scholarship programs and granting visas for uHEI. Some schools do offer those on their own, and they can provide students with it if they have enlisted in uHEI private programs and achieve it through these means. These scholarships are not granted by the Swiss Ministry of Education and are in no part of their own educational systems, visa included.

== Non-regulated professions ==
Private degrees from unaccredited institutions are considered to be usable only in non-regulated professions (such as a manager or journalist). In regards to employment, the valuation of these degrees falls to the employers. For certain non-regulated occupations, some employers require that applicants be registered or certified by the relevant professional association as a condition for employment.

== List of institutes and companies ==
This table is based on data from Swiss official sites Swissuniversities and Akkreditierungsrat, as well as whether the German government recognizes the institution's degrees as equivalent to German university degrees. This information may not be complete.

School	City, Canton	Awarding University degrees	Programmatic accreditations	Memberships	German recognition status	Notes
Albert Schweitzer International University	Genève, GE					Swiss entity in liquidation.
Academy of Business Management - The Open University of Switzerland	Zurich, ZH	Joint/Dual Programs with University of Dąbrowa Górnicza (WSB) - Poland, Taras Shevchenko National University (KNU) - Ukraine, Central University of Nicaragua (UCN) - Nicaragua	ASIC	AACSB		"Royal Academy of Economics and Technology in Switzerland", ous.edu.eu, registered as A.B.M.S. GmbH.
AEB Schweiz - Akademie für Erwachsenenbildung	Lucerne and Zurich	Adult further-education institution, not a Swiss university			Non-university institution	"Academy for Adult Education", offers diplomas, CAS, DAS, Masters, etc.. aeb.ch
Benjamin Franklin College	Baar	liquidated	liquidated	liquidated		Name change, liquidated, still listed in Anabin repository.
Baptistische Theologische Hochschule	Rüschlikon				Non-university institution	Private theological school, does not possess AAQ .
Business and Hotel Management School	Lucerne, LU	Delivers a university degree in partnership with Robert Gordon University for Bachelors & Masters, and with York St John University for MBAs.	ACBSP	EURHODIP, I-CHRIE, American Hotel & Lodging Association		Has business, hotel and culinary programs and degrees.
Basel School of Business	Basel, BS		IACBE		Non-university institution	TheBaselSchool.ch
BSL Business School Lausanne	Lausanne, VD		ACBSP	AACSB, AMBA-BGA, EFMD		BSL-Lausanne.ch
Cesar Ritz Colleges	Lucerne, LU		The International Centre of Excellence in Tourism and Hospitality Education (THE-ICE),	AACSB	Non-university institution	Hotel & business school, not a Swiss university Cesarritzcolleges.edu
Center for Urban & Real Estate Management	Zurich		AACSB, EQUIS, RICS			Part of University Zurich but not recognized as University by Anabin, curem.uzh.ch
Das Institut für Gemeindebau und Weltmission (IGW) (see German wiki)	Zurich			AEM, ECTE, FreiKirchen, SEA,	Non-university institution	Private theological school, not a Swiss university Bachelor and Master studies
EU Business School	Geneva, GE	[Titulo propio] through academic partnerships by Universidad Católica San Antonio de Murcia (UCAM), State-recognized University of Derby, London Metropolitan University, and Dublin Business School	ACBSP / IACBE	EFMD, AACSB, ABIS, IAUP, ECBE		Euruni.edu
EuroSwiss Universität	Neuhausen, SH				Non-university institution	Not a University in Swiss, does not possess AAQ EuroSwissUniversitaet.ch
Europäische Universität für Interdisziplinäre Studien EUFIS	Leuk					
Educatis AG (see German Wiki)	Kastanienbaum, LU	-	None			Private business school, not Swiss university Educatis.org
ESM - Ecole de Management et Communication	Geneva					ESM.ch
Fern-University of Zurich	Cham					
Freie Universität Lugano für Human- und technologische Wissenschaften	Lugano					Private business school (science/tech focus), not a Swiss university
Geneva Business School	Geneva, GE		IACBE	AACSB ACBSP		Private business school, not a Swiss university GBSGE.com
Geneva School of Business and Economics	Geneva, GE	-	None	None		Not a Swiss university, No longer registered in Switzerland as a business under Zefix
Geneva School of Diplomacy	Geneva, GE	-	None	None		Not a Swiss university, Geneva School of Diplomacy
Gesthotel SA Hotel Management School	Bluche, Crans-Montana					Private hotel management school, not a Swiss university
Glion Institute of Higher Education	Montreux & Bulle		Memberships AACSB (member); International Center for Academic Integrity (member); Institute of Hospitality (Academic Partner)			Swiss higher education institution; institutionally accredited under HEdA as a university of applied sciences institute (Swiss Accreditation Council decision 20 June 2025; appears on swissuniversities accredited list).
GSBA Zurich	Zurich, Zurich	-				Not a Swiss university, GSB.UZH.ch No longer operational, under a different name
HTMi, Hotel and Tourism Management Institute Switzerland	Sörenberg, LU					Private hotel & tourism school, not a Swiss university HTMI.ch
IFM Business School	Geneva, GE		ACBSP IACBE			Private business school, not a university IFM.ch
IMI International Management Institute Switzerland	Kastanienbaum, LU	Dual degrees with Manchester Metropolitan University.				Private business school, not a university IMI-Luzern.com
Institut Technique Supérieur	Fribourg					Not a Swiss university
International Hotel and Tourism Training Institute	Neuchâtel, NE					Not a Swiss university IHTTI.com
International Management School Geneva	Geneva, GE			AACSB		Private business school, not a Swiss university IMSGeneva.ch
International University in Geneva	Geneva, GE		ACBSP, IACBE	-		IUN.ch
Montreux Institute of Business Development	Montreux, VD					Not in list / Not a Swiss university MIBD.ch
Monarch Business School Switzerland	Zug, ZG	None	None	ACBSP		Not a Swiss university UMonarch.ch
Rochat School of Business	Montreux, VD	No	None			Private business school, not a Swiss university Rochatsb.ch, registered as 'Sacré Coeur (Switzerland).
Rushford Business School	Geneva, GE					Private business school, not a Swiss university RushFord.ch. IACBE member, no IACBE accreditation
Sustainability Management School	Gland, VD		ACBSP			Private institution, not Swiss university Sumas.ch
Swiss Montreux Business School (SMBS)	Montreux, Vaud			-		Private business school, not a Swiss university SMBS-Montreux.ch
Swiss School of Business and Management (SSBM)	Geneva, GE		ACBSP	AACSB		Private business school, not a Swiss university SSBM.ch
Swiss Hotel Management School	Caux					Private business & hotel school, not a Swiss university
Swiss International School of Business	Montreux Monthey, VD+VS	-	None			Private business school, not a Swiss university SISB.ch
Swiss Management Center (formerly SMC University)	Zug, ZG	Dual Degrees with Universidad Central de Nicaragua - UCN (?)	-			Private business school, not a Swiss university SMC.com
Swiss School of Business Research (SSBR)	Zurich, ZU		-			Private business school, not a Swiss university SSBR-Edu.ch
Swiss School of Higher Education	Montreux, VD	-	None			Private business school, not a Swiss university SSHE.ch
Swiss School of Tourism and Hospitality	Chur					Private business & hotel school, not a Swiss university
Swiss School of Management	Bellinzona	No	IACBE			Private business school, not a Swiss university
University of Business & Finance Switzerland	Wettingen					Private business school, not a Swiss university
United International Business School	Zurich, ZH		ACBSP	AACSB		Private business school, not a Swiss university UIBS.org
UBIS University	Geneva, GE		IACBE	EFMD		Private business school, not a Swiss university Ubis-Geneva.ch
Vatel Martigny, Switzerland - Hotel & Tourism Business School	Martigny, VS					Private business & hotel school, not a Swiss university Vatel.ch
Victoria University	Neuchâtel					Private business school, not a Swiss university Specialized in Hotel and Management
WES'SUP	Geneva	-	None			Private business school, not a university WES-SUP.ch
Wesford Genève	Aïre – Geneva	-	None			Not a Swiss university FcWesford.ch
Zurich Elite Business School	Zurich, ZH	-	ASIC			Private business school, not a Swiss university Zebs.ch

== See also ==
- Accreditation mill
- For-profit education
- Educational accreditation
- List of unaccredited institutions of higher education
- List of unrecognized higher education accreditation organizations
- Unaccredited institutions of higher education
