= Geneva School of Diplomacy and International Relations =

For-profit school in Switzerland

Geneva School of Diplomacy
- Type: Private, for-profit
- Established: 2003
- Location: Le Grand-Saconne, Switzerland
- Campus: Le Grand-Saconnex, Geneva canton
- Language: English
- Website: https://genevadiplomacy.ch/

The Geneva School of Diplomacy (GSD) is a for-profit school located in Le Grand-Saconnex, Switzerland that offers educational programs in international relations and diplomacy.

== History ==
GSD is owned and was established in 2003 by Colum de Sales Murphy, a former United Nations employee. It aims at offering training in diplomacy and international relations. It is located near Geneva's diplomatic quarter, close to the United Nations Office at Geneva and other international organisations. GSD is incorporated as an S.A. (corporation) (In French: Société Anonyme) in Switzerland.

== Accreditation ==
GSD is not accredited as a university in Switzerland. It is, however, certified by EduQua, a Swiss quality label for continuing education institutions that does not certify nor accredit institutions. In 2026, several of its academic programmes received conditional accreditation to teach business and accounting programs from the U.S.-based Accreditation Council for Business Schools and Programs.

== Criticism ==
The school has been the subject of reports in mainstream Swiss news media about the quality of its services, amid a lack of educational accreditation, even as it ran its programs, and complaints from students. In 2022, the independent media outlet The Geneva Observer reported that the Geneva School of Diplomacy (GSD) was among unregistered schools in Geneva characterized by "unrecognized diplomas, poor management and shady business practices." In another report, it reported that students and alumni who were unsatisfied with the quality of education provided by the school had felt "cheated" (in French: "trompés") by enrolling in the school and later realizing that it was unaccredited. Also in 2022, Swissinfo and Radio Télévision Suisse (RTS) included GSD in a list of private academic institutions in Geneva with high costs per semester and no accreditation. RTS said the schools in the list offered "expensive courses not recognized by Swiss academic authorities."

== Faculty ==
Notable faculty include Alfred-Maurice de Zayas.

== See also ==
- List of institutions not listed as Accredited Swiss Higher Education Institutions according to HEdA
- Swissuniversities, the Swiss government's umbrella organization of accredited universities and colleges in Switzerland.
