= Swiss Education Group =

Hospitality school network in Switzerland

- Type: Private
- Industry: Hospitality, Education, Culinary Arts, Business
- Headquarters: Montreux, Switzerland
- Key people: Leo Wang (CEO)
- Owner: Summer Capital
- Website: swisseducation.com

Swiss Education Group (SEG) AG is a network of business, hospitality and culinary schools that includes 4 schools—Culinary Arts Academy Switzerland, HIM Business School, Swiss Hotel Management School, and César Ritz Colleges Switzerland. Its schools operate across 5 campuses all based in Switzerland, with a student base of more than 6,000 enrolled students from around the world. Its schools have more than 45,000 alumni representing 110 nationalities.

Chief Executive Officer Leo Wang joined Swiss Education Group in 2022.

== History ==
Swiss Education Group was founded in 1986 and was originally called the Swiss Language Club (SLC) before being renamed to Swiss Education Academy. At the time, they hosted summer camps for young people ages 7-18 years old from around the world.

In 1992, Swiss Hotel Management School was established as the first school under the umbrella of Swiss Education Group.

HIM (founded in 1985) was acquired by Swiss Education Group in 2002 and International Hotel and Tourism Training Institute (IHTTI) (founded in 1984) also joined Swiss Education Group in 2004. That same year, Swiss Hotel Management School opened their Leysin campus after acquiring the Mont Blanc and Belvédère hotels.

César Ritz Colleges Switzerland (founded in 1982) and Culinary Arts Academy Switzerland (formerly known as DCT European Culinary Arts) joined the education group in 2011.

In 2017, Swiss Education Group launched their SEGPro program designed to offer professional courses in hospitality, culinary arts, and leadership.

Swiss Education Group’s holding company—Swiss Education Group Holding AG—sold the education network to the Hong Kong-based investment management company, Summer Capital, in 2018.

In 2021, IHTTI merged with Swiss Hotel Management School.

== Schools ==
Swiss Education Group consists of 4 business, culinary and hospitality schools across 5 campuses in the French-speaking regions of Switzerland. Programs are presented in English and attract students from more than 110 countries. As of 2026, all 4 schools that belong to the Swiss Education Group portfolio have been ranked amongst the top 10 in the world by the QS World University Rankings.

=== César Ritz Colleges Switzerland ===
César Ritz Colleges Switzerland is a hospitality school with campus in Brig, Switzerland. It is inspired by Swiss hotelier and hospitality leader César Ritz—founder of the Hôtel Ritz in Paris and the Ritz and Carlton Hotels in London and ranked in the top five worldwide for the QS World University Rankings for Hospitality & Leisure Management.

==== Programs ====
César Ritz Colleges Switzerland offers bachelor's and master's degree programs, as well as a Certificate in Wine Business Management. The degree programs are accredited by the Swiss Federal Council.

==== Campus ====
The school is located in Brig, and also shares campus with Culinary Arts Academy Switzerland in Le Bouveret.

=== Culinary Arts Academy Switzerland ===
Culinary Arts Academy Switzerland was founded in 2006. It shares campuses in Le Bouveret and Brig with César Ritz Colleges Switzerland, and is the top-ranked culinary school in Switzerland. Since 2025, CAAS is accredited by the American Culinary Federation (ACF), North America's leading chef association.

==== Programs ====
Culinary Arts Academy offers bachelor's and master's degrees programs and specialized diploma programs in Culinary Arts, and Pastry, Bakery & Chocolate arts. Programs are accredited in partnership with the University of Derby (UK).

==== Campuses ====
The school is situated across two campuses, Le Bouveret and shared with César Ritz Colleges Switzerland in Brig. The campus in Le Bouveret is home to the Apicius Culinary Training Center.

=== HIM Business School ===
HIM is a private business school located on the shores of Lake Geneva in Montreux, Switzerland. The school offers a 3-year Bachelor of Business Administration (BBA) degree with 1.5 year internships, with 4 majors: Marketing, Finance, Management, Hospitality. As of 2025, it is ranked sixth in the world by the QS World University Rankings for Employer Reputation and Academic Reputation in Hospitality & Leisure Management.

==== Programs ====
HIM offers 2 degrees:

- Bachelor’s in Business Administration with 4 majors (with 2 versions in Chinese or French to help students during Year 1 & 2)
- Master in Applied AI in Customer Experience

==== Campus ====
The school is housed in 4 buildings on the shores of Lake Geneva in Montreux, Switzerland—Hotel Europe, Leman Residence, Miramonte Hotel, and The Freddie Mercury and provides accommodation and learning facilities.

=== Swiss Hotel Management School ===
Swiss Hotel Management School (SHMS) specializes in the study of hospitality management. It was established in 1992 and is situated across 2 campuses in Caux and Leysin, Switzerland. As of 2026, it is the 4th ranked school in the world by the QS World University Rankings for Hospitality & Leisure Management.

==== Programs ====
The school offers a variety of bachelor’s and master’s degree programs, postgraduate studies, and online degrees covering a range of specialties including: Hospitality Management, Design, Events, Luxury Brands, and Business Analytics. Programs are accredited in partnership with the University of Derby (UK).

==== Campuses ====
SHMS is situated across 2 campuses in Caux and Leysin, Switzerland. Nicknamed "the Sleeping Beauty Castle", SHMS's Caux Palace campus is a converted palace luxury hotel situated above Montreux, Switzerland. SHMS's Leysin campus is based in 2 former Belle Epoque hotels in the ski resort town of Leysin, Switzerland.

== Accreditations & partnerships ==
Partnerships include Dorchester Collection, Kempinski, and UBS Bank.

== See Also ==
- César Ritz Colleges Switzerland
- Culinary Arts Academy Switzerland
- HIM Business School
- SHMS Swiss Hotel Management School
- International Hotel and Tourism Training Institute
