= International Hotel and Tourism Training Institute =

IHTTI School Of Hotel and Design Management
- Established: 1986-2021
- Location: Switzerland
- Website: www.ihtti.com
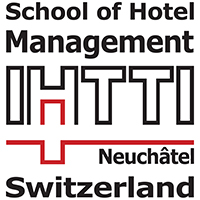

IHTTI School Of Hotel and Design Management was a hospitality management school in Neuchâtel, Switzerland. IHTTI opened in 1986 as one of Switzerland's first English speaking hotel management schools and was officially registered in the canton of Neuchâtel as a private school.

IHTTI was owned by Swiss Education Group (SEG), one of six investment holdings in the Invision IV portfolio of companies, and was a member of the Swiss Hotel Schools Association Swiss Hotel Schools Association (ASEH).

In 2021, IHTTI ranked tenth in the world among hospitality and leisure schools, according to the QS World University Rankings.

== History ==
1984 Officially registered under the name IHTTI, International Hotel and Tourism Training Institute

1986 Opens in a small village in the Canton of Lucerne

1988 Moves to new and larger facilities in the city centre of Lucerne

1990 Moves to Neuchâtel in the former Eurotel hotel

2001 Validation of IHTTI Higher Diploma by the Canton of Neuchâtel

2004 Becomes a member of Swiss Education Group

2005 Becomes a member of ASEH, Swiss Hotel Schools Association (ASEH)

2008 Completes of the renovation of school facilities

2012 New partner university for the bachelor's (Hons) degree, University of Derby, United Kingdom

2019 Campus moves to Caux and Leysin, shared campuses with Swiss Hotel Management School

2021 IHTTI merges its programs with Swiss Hotel Management School

== See also ==
- HIM Business School
- Swiss Hotel Management School
- César Ritz Colleges Switzerland
- Culinary Arts Academy Switzerland
- Swiss Education Group
