= List of hospitality management schools in Switzerland =

This is a list of institutions of higher education in Switzerland that offer programs in hospitality management studies that are Certified by the Swiss national quality label for further education institutions (EduQua) and other accreditations including: EFMD, ISO ASIC, ECBE and IACBE.

== Private hospitality schools in Switzerland ==
- American Institute of Applied Sciences in Switzerland
- Business and Hotel Management School - Switzerland- BHMS
- César Ritz Colleges
- Culinary Arts Academy Switzerland- CAA
- École hôtelière de Genève- EHG
- EU Business School (Geneva campus)
- Glion Institute of Higher Education- GLION
- HIM Business School- HIM
- HTMi, Hotel and Tourism Management Institute Switzerland- HTMi
- International School of Business Management- ISBM
- International Management Institute Switzerland- IMI
- Les Roches International School of Hotel Management- Les Roches
- Swiss Hotel Management School- SHMS
- Swiss Institute for Management and Hospitality- SWISS IM&H

== Public Universities offering Hospitality programs ==
- Lucerne University of Applied Sciences and Arts - SHL Schweizerische Hotelfachschule Luzern
- University of Applied Sciences Western Switzerland - École hôtelière de Lausanne- EHL (Affiliated to the University of Applied Sciences Western Switzerland HES-SO)
  - Swiss School of Tourism and Hospitality- SSTH - Member school of École hôtelière de Lausanne

== Defunct Hospitality Schools ==
- DCT University Center Hospitality Leadership & European Culinary Arts (Become later Culinary Arts Academy Switzerland- CAA)
- LRG University of Applied Sciences
- International Hotel and Tourism Training Institute- IHTTI (Merged with Swiss Hotel Management School- SHMS)

== See also ==
- Swiss national quality label for further education institutions (EduQua)
- List of business schools in Switzerland

== Notes and references ==
- Official website of Business and Hotel Management School - Switzerland - BHMS
- Official website of Swiss Hotel Management School - SHMS
- Official website of César Ritz Colleges
- Official website of Culinary Arts Academy Switzerland
- Official website of HIM Business School
- Official website of École hôtelière de Lausanne
- Official website of HTMi, Hotel and Tourism Management Institute Switzerland
- Official website of IMI International Management Institute Switzerland
- Official website of École hôtelière de Genève
- Official website of EU Business School
- Official website of Glion Institute of Higher Education
- Official website of Les Roches International School of Hotel Management
- Official website of Swiss School of Tourism and Hospitality
