= Ernst Faseth =

Austrian chef

Ernst Faseth (born January 14, 1917, in Vienna; † April 22, 2008 in Baden near Vienna) was an Austrian chef who was best known for a cooking show on Austrian television.

== Biography ==
Ernst Faseth studied in the Südbahnhotel on the Semmering Pass until 1934. One of his instructors there was Robert Dorré, former personal cook of Archduke Franz Ferdinand of Austria. After completing his training, Faseth worked in the Salzburg Casino Mirabell and as the personal cook of Princess Stephanie von Hohenlohe in England. During the World War II, Faseth was injured in Russia in 1942 and he was no longer fit for military service. He then worked at the Vienna Hotel Management School until his retirement in 1985.

Between 1962 and 1978 he worked as a television chef at ORF and designed around 150 programs. Until 1985 he looked after colleagues who succeeded him in this position. In 1964, as head teacher in the kitchen at the hotel management school, Faseth won a gold medal at the 11th International Culinary Art Exhibition in Frankfurt and the Gold Grand Prize and the Prize of Honor of the IKA. His biscuit dessert, the Vöslauer grape-wine cream roulade, became well known. Ernst Faseth had been married since 1953, had a son and two grandchildren. He died in Baden in 2008. He was buried in his home town Bad Vöslau. The funeral speech was held by his colleague Franz Zodl.

== Awards ==
In December 1977, the Viennese state government gave Ernst Fasth, Hans Hofer and Helmuth Misak the Golden earnings sign of the country Vienna. However, they were not honoured for their celebrity as a television chef, but for their role as senior officials of the Association of the chefs of Austria and the associated further improvement of the international reputation of cuisine in Vienna. According to a report of the Arbeiter-Zeitung of 19 February 1978, he received the silver order as an ambassador of Viennese cuisine.

== Membership ==
- President of the Chefs' Association of Austria
- Secretary-General of the World Association of Chefs' Societies (1956-1960)
- President of the World Association of Chefs' Societies (1968-1972)
- Conseiller Culinaire the Austria-Bailiaga of the Confrérie de la Chaîne des Rôtisseurs
- Honorary President of the Vöslauer Tourism Association
