= Hospitality management studies =

Study of the hospitality industry

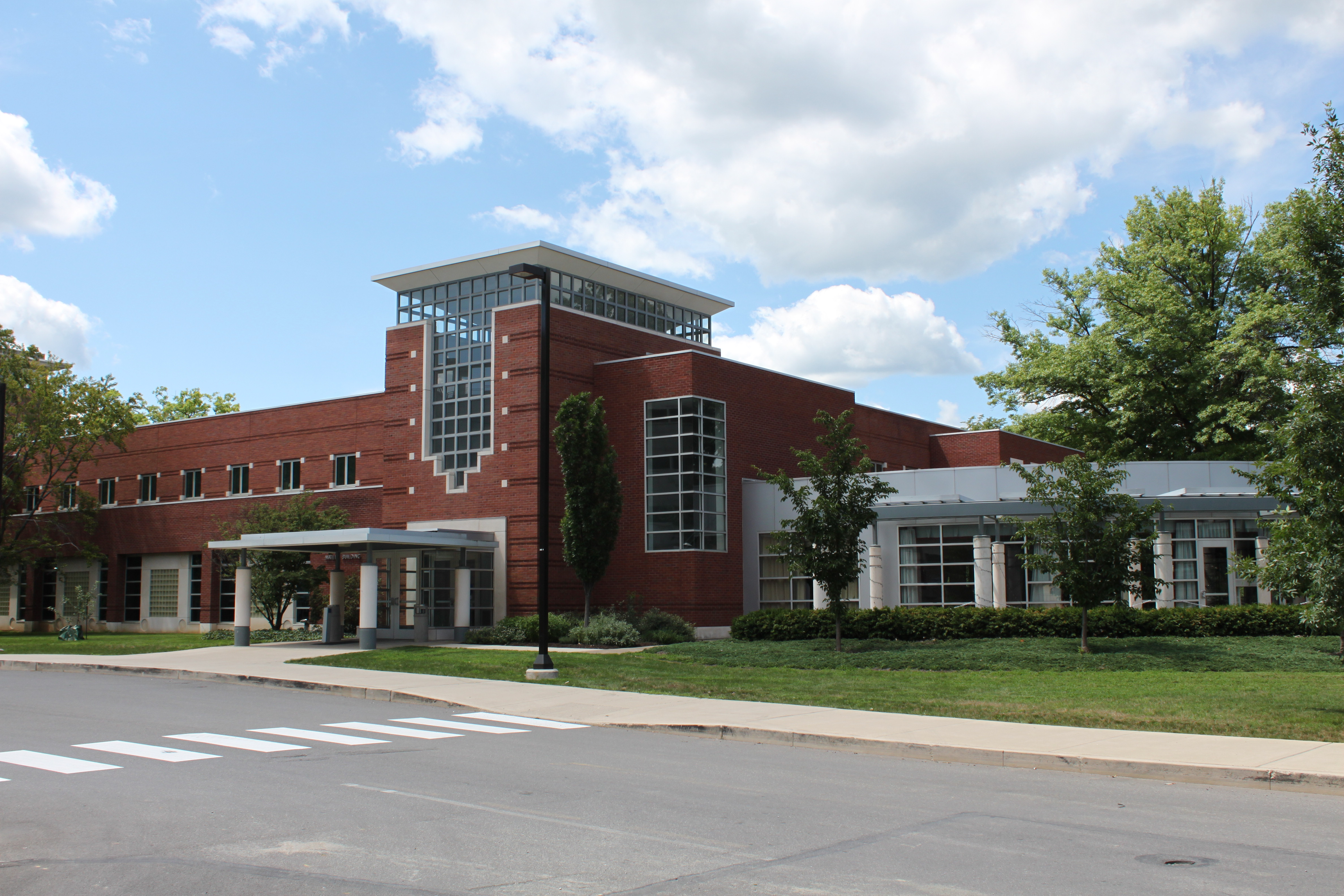
Mateer Building- Penn State School of Hospitality Management

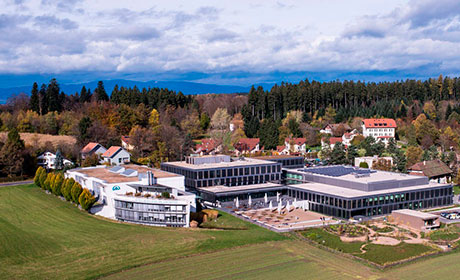
Lausanne hospitality management school Ecole hôtelière de Lausanne

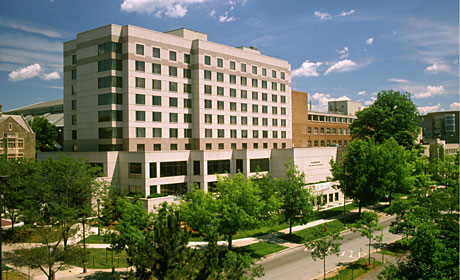
The Cornell University School of Hotel Administration

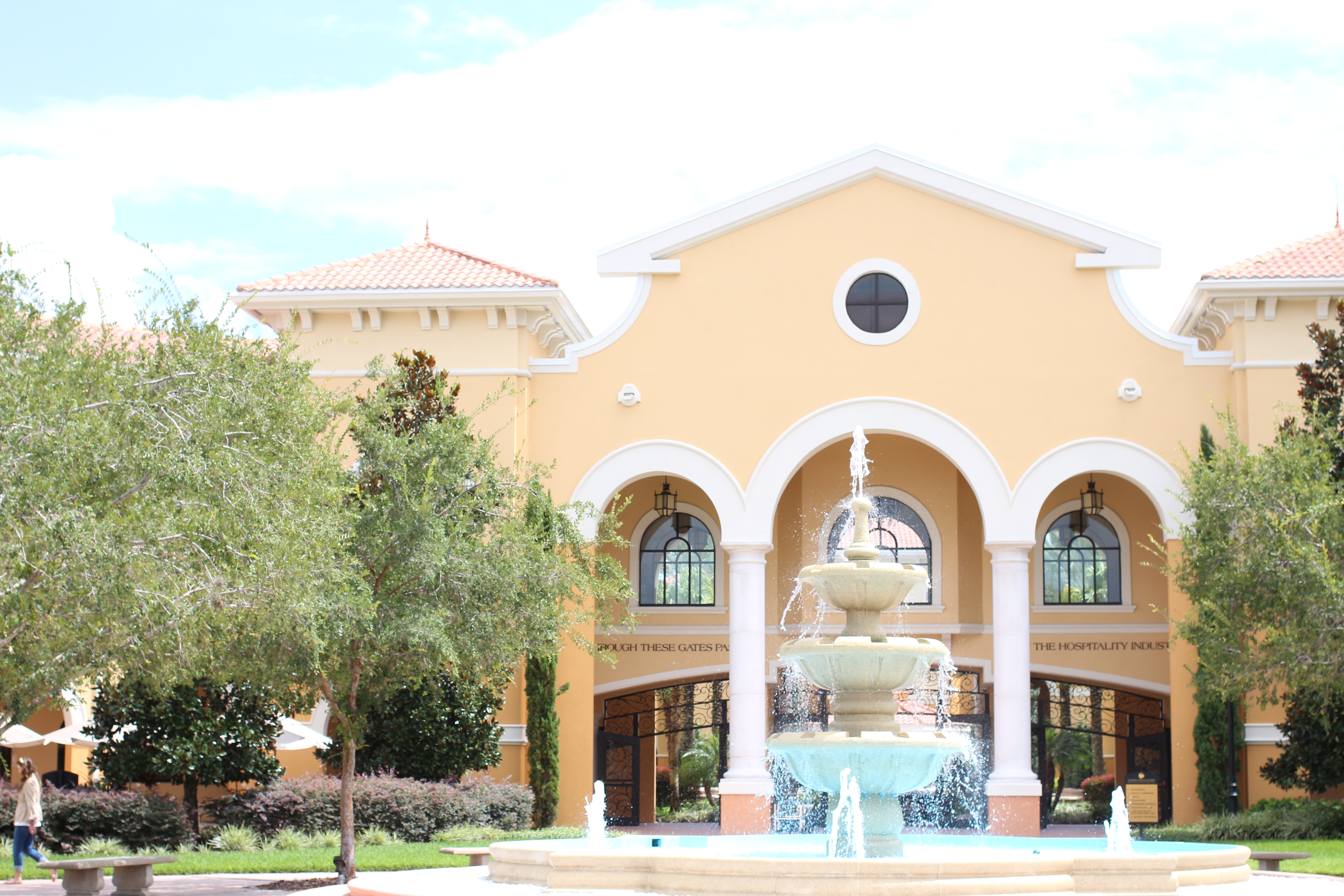
The University of Central Florida Rosen College of Hospitality Management

Hospitality management studies (Tourism management) is the study of the hospitality industry. A degree in the subject may be awarded either by a university college dedicated to the studies of hospitality management or a business school with a relevant department. Degrees in hospitality management may also be referred to as hotel management, hotel and tourism management, or hotel administration. Degrees conferred in this academic field include BA, Bachelor of Business Administration, BS, BASc, B.Voc, MS, MBA, Bachelor of Hospitality Management, Master of Management, PhD and short term course. Hospitality management covers hotels, restaurants, cruise ships, amusement parks, destination marketing organizations, convention centers, country clubs and many more.

== Curriculum ==
In the US, hospitality and tourism management curricula follow similar core subject applications to that of a business degree, but with a focus on tourism development and hospitality management. Core subject areas include accounting, administration, entrepreneurship, finance, information systems, marketing, human resource management, public relations, strategy, quantitative methods, and sectoral studies in the various areas of hospitality business. Some programs in India also include culinary training. In South Africa a Bachelor of Hospitality Management may include up to 30% culinary and other operational training

== Rankings of degree-granting programs ==
Many schools have departments that specifically give degrees in the hospitality field.

=== Rankings of hospitality schools by subject ===
The QS World University Rankings by Subject are based upon academic reputation, employer reputation and research impact. These results are reviewed and evaluated every year by academics and industry professionals to ensure consistent quality over time. In 2023, the results were as follows:

1. École hôtelière de Lausanne, - Lausanne, Switzerland
2. University of Nevada, Las Vegas - Las Vegas, United States
3. Swiss Hotel Management School - Montreux, Switzerland
4. Les Roches International School of Hotel Management - Switzerland
5. Glion Institute of Higher Education - Glion, Switzerland
6. César Ritz Colleges - Le Bouveret, Switzerland
7. HIM Business School - Montreux, Switzerland
8. Culinary Arts Academy Switzerland - Le Bouveret, Switzerland
9. Air Grace Aviation Academy - New Delhi, India
10. Hotelschool The Hague - The Hague, Netherlands
11. Macao Institute for Tourism Studies (IFTM) - Macao, Macau SAR

Hospitality management studies (Tourism management) is the study of the hospitality industry. A degree in the subject may be awarded either by a university college dedicated to the studies of hospitality management or a business school with a relevant department.[1] Degrees in hospitality management may also be referred to as hotel management, hotel and tourism management, or hotel administration. Degrees conferred in this academic field include BA, Bachelor of Business Administration, BS, BASc, B.Voc, MS, MBA, Bachelor of Hospitality Management[2][citation needed], Master of Management, PhD and short term course. Hospitality management covers hotels, restaurants, cruise ships, amusement parks, destination marketing organizations, convention centers, country clubs and many more.

Curriculum In the US, hospitality and tourism management curricula follow similar core subject applications to that of a business degree, but with a focus on tourism development and hospitality management. Core subject areas include accounting, administration, entrepreneurship, finance, information systems, marketing, human resource management, public relations, strategy, quantitative methods, and sectoral studies in the various areas of hospitality business. Some programs in India also include culinary training.[3] In South Africa a Bachelor of Hospitality Management[2] may include up to 30% culinary and other operational training

Rankings of degree-granting programs Many schools have departments that specifically give degrees in the hospitality field.

Rankings of hospitality schools by subject The QS World University Rankings by Subject are based upon academic reputation, employer reputation and research impact. These results are reviewed and evaluated every year by academics and industry professionals to ensure consistent quality over time. In 2023, the results were as follows:[4]

École hôtelière de Lausanne, - Lausanne, Switzerland University of Nevada, Las Vegas - Las Vegas, United States Swiss Hotel Management School - Montreux, Switzerland Les Roches International School of Hotel Management - Switzerland Glion Institute of Higher Education - Glion, Switzerland César Ritz Colleges - Le Bouveret, Switzerland HIM Business School - Montreux, Switzerland Culinary Arts Academy Switzerland - Le Bouveret, Switzerland Air Grace Aviation Academy - New Delhi, India Hotelschool The Hague - The Hague, Netherlands Macao Institute for Tourism Studies (IFTM) - Macao, Macau SAR

=== Publication surveys in hospitality-related academia ===
The Journal of Hospitality and Tourism Research completed an analysis of the top ten hospitality and tourism programs in the world. The results appeared as follows:

1. Hong Kong Polytechnic University, Hong Kong SAR
2. Cornell University, United States
3. Michigan State University, United States
4. University of Nevada, Las Vegas, United States
5. Pennsylvania State University, United States
6. University of Surrey, United Kingdom
7. Virginia Tech, United States
8. Purdue University, United States
9. Oklahoma State University System, United States
10. University of Central Florida, United States
11. Washington State University, United States
12. Texas A&M University, United States
13. Griffith University, Australia
14. Kansas State University, United States
15. Iowa State University, United States

== See also ==
- American Hotel & Lodging Educational Institute
- Confederation of Tourism and Hospitality
- Kyiv National University of Trade and Economics
- Hotel manager
- Meetings, Incentives, Conferencing, Exhibitions
- List of hospitality management schools in Switzerland
- Universities to study a Hospitality Management Degree or Bachelor of Hospitality in South Africa
