= 2015 Valais Youth Cup =

Valais Football Summer Cup

Tournament details
- Host country: Switzerland
- Dates: 7 – 9 August
- Teams: 4 (from 1 confederation)
- Venue: 1 (in 1 host city)

Final positions
- Champions: (Portugal) Porto (1st title)
- Runners-up: (France) Monaco
- Third place: (Spain) Atlético Madrid
- Fourth place: (Switzerland) Sion

Tournament statistics
- Matches played: 4
- Goals scored: 21 (5.25 per match)

The 2015 Valais Youth Cup was an international football tournament that featured four youth teams. It was played at the Complexe Sportif du Bout du Lac in Le Bouveret, Switzerland.

== Participants ==
The competition featured four youth clubs:

- (Switzerland) Sion
- (France) Monaco
- (Portugal) Porto
- (Spain) Atlético Madrid

== Bracket ==
Semi-finals; 7 August
17:00 CEST - Le Bouveret
(Spain) Atlético Madrid	1
(France) Monaco	5
19:30 CEST - Le Bouveret
(Portugal) Porto	3
(Switzerland) Sion	1

Final; 9 August
18:30 CEST - Le Bouveret
(France) Monaco	3
(Portugal) Porto	4
Third place
16:00 CEST - Le Bouveret
(Switzerland) Sion	0
(Spain) Atlético Madrid	4

== Matches ==
=== Semi-finals ===
7 August 2015
17:00 CEST

Atlético Madrid (Spain)	1–5	(France) Monaco

Complexe Sportif du Bout du Lac, Le Bouveret

7 August 2015
19:30 CEST

Porto (Portugal)	3–1	(Switzerland) Sion

Complexe Sportif du Bout du Lac, Le Bouveret

=== Third place play-off ===
9 August 2015
16:00 CEST

Sion (Switzerland)	0–4	(Spain) Atlético Madrid

Complexe Sportif du Bout du Lac, Le Bouveret

=== Final ===
9 August 2015
18:30 CEST

Monaco (France)	3–4	(Portugal) Porto

Complexe Sportif du Bout du Lac, Le Bouveret
