= BHMS =

BHMS is a four letter acronym that can stand for:

== Alternative medicine ==
- Bachelor of Homeopathic Medicine and Surgery, a degree awarded by the National Commission for Homoeopathy in India

== Schools ==
- Business and Hotel Management School - Switzerland
- Bret Harte Middle School (San Jose, California)
- Bret Harte Middle School (Oakland, California)
- Brandywine Heights Middle School (Topton, Pennsylvania)
- Black Hawk Middle School, in Eagan, Minnesota
- Broomfield Hills Middle School, part of the Bloomfield Hills School District in Broomfield Hills Michigan
