= Carson College of Business =

Business school of Washington State University

Coordinates: 46.7298549°N 117.1636931°W

- Type: Public; Business school
- Established: 1963
- Parent institution: Washington State University
- Dean: Debbie Compeau (Interim)
- Location: Pullman, Washington, U.S.
- Website: www.business.wsu.edu

The Carson College of Business is the business school of Washington State University in Pullman, Washington. Established in 1963, it is one of the largest of the ten colleges in WSU.

== History ==
The College of Business first offered economics courses since Washington State University started operating in 1892. The Department of Economic Science and History was created in 1917 as part of the College of Sciences and Arts, and in 1926, it became the Department of Business Administration. The department started offering programs in Secretarial Science, apart from the normal offering of economics courses, which is at that time composed of only five faculty members.

In 1928, the Department of Business Administration was elevated to school status and the faculty grew to fifteen members. However, it was incorporated with the College of Sciences and Arts until it received independent status in 1940. In 1948, the Economics department from the College of Sciences and Arts and the School of Business Administration merged, becoming the School of Economics and Business with the help of Dr. M. W. Lee.

In 1963, the school was granted college status and became the College of Business and Economics. The first functioning dean was Dr. Eugene Clark. The college first offered business courses with the establishment of three branch campuses of Washington State University in Tri-Cities, Spokane and Vancouver in 1989. The School of Economics Sciences is now part of College of Agricultural, Human, and Natural Resource Sciences which offers courses in economics.

In 2006, the Washington State University Regents voted to change the college's name to the College of Business.

== Departments ==
WSU College of Business is divided into various units:

- Department of Accounting
- Department of Management, Information Systems, and Entrepreneurship
- Department of Marketing and International Business
- Department of Finance and Management Science
- Graduate Programs
- International Business Institute
- School of Hospitality Business Management

== Academics ==
Business school rankings

U.S. MBA Rankings
- Bloomberg (2025): NR
- U.S. News & World Report (2026): NR

The College of Business offers undergraduate and graduate programs at three Washington State University campuses in Pullman, Tri-Cities and Vancouver.The college is accredited by the Association to Advance Collegiate Schools of Business (AACSB).

== International programs ==
In addition, the College of Business provides degree programs, internships, study abroad and faculty-led programs in Australia, China, Greece, Italy, Korea, Spain, Turkey, Tanzania, Switzerland, and Thailand.

=== Partnership with Cesar Ritz Colleges Switzerland ===
The WSU College of Business and the Cesar Ritz Colleges Switzerland have a partnership that confer two degrees from both institutions, a bachelor's degree in Hospitality Business Management from WSU College of Business and a bachelor's degree in International Business from Cesar Ritz Colleges. The three-year program allows students to earn two degrees with an extensive global business position and two six-month internships in Switzerland. Nearly 1,000 students have earned a Washington State University degree through César Ritz Colleges since its inception in 1984.

=== International Business Institute ===
WSU offers more than 1,200 education abroad opportunities. To date, the College of Business offers the following study abroad programs:

==== Faculty-led Programs ====
===== Semester Programs at International Centers =====
- Business in Switzerland, César Ritz Colleges
- Business in China, Southwestern University of Finance and Economics (SWUFE)

===== Summer Programs =====
- Business in Australia, CAPA Sydney Program
- Business in Greece, University of Crete
- Business in Korea, Korea University
- Business in Northern Thailand, Chiang Mai University
- Business in Spain, Universitat Politècnica de València
- Business in Tanzania, The Nelson Mandela African Institute of Science and Technology
- Food and Wine of Italy, Apicius International School of Hospitality
- Hospitality Experience in Phuket, Thailand, The Tropical Garden Resort

== Facilities ==
Facilities include:

- Atrium Cafe
- College of Business Copy Center
- E-Commerce Computer Classroom
- Finance and Management Science Classroom
- Financial Markets Trading Room
- Graduate Suite
- College of Business Atrium Display Gallery
- Technology Classroom
- Wine Business Management Classroom

== Centers and institutes ==
WSU College of Business hosts numerous centers and institutes for research activities. Centers and institutes include:

- Center for Behavioral Business Research
- Center for Entrepreneurial Studies
- Innovation Assessment Center
- J Willard and Alice S. Marriott Foundation Hospitality Teaching Center
- Carson Center for Student Success
- WSU Economic Development Administration University Center
- Howard D. and B. Phyllis Hoops Institute of Taxation Research and Policy
- International Business Institute
- Granger Cobb Institute for Senior Living
