= Culinary Arts Academy Switzerland =

School in Switzerland, devoted to culinary studies

Coordinates: 47.0108°N 8.4834°E

- Motto: Passion for Food, Career for Life
- Type: Private Culinary school
- Established: 2006
- Parent institution: Swiss Education Group
- Accreditation: American Culinary Federation ACF, University of Derby, UN Tourism TedQual, World Association of Chefs' Societies, Federation of Swiss Private Schools, COBIS Council of British International Schools
- Dean: Alain Müller
- Students: 347
- Location: Le Bouveret, 1897, Switzerland
- Campus: Le Bouveret & Brig
- Colors: Red, black and white
- Website: www.swisseducation.com/en/culinary-arts-academy-switzerland/

Culinary Arts Academy Switzerland (CAAS) is a culinary school located in Le Bouveret (Switzerland) and a sister school of César Ritz Colleges Switzerland. Its campus also houses the Mosimann Collection, an extensive collection of culinary memorabilia provided by Chef Anton Mosimann, OBE.

As of 2026, the school is ranked 9th in the world in the hospitality and leisure category by QS World University Rankings, and remains Switzerland's #1 culinary school. CAAS is the only Swiss culinary school with an accreditation from the American Culinary Federation (ACF), North America's leading chefs' association.

== Education ==
For the first 2 years of their studies, Bachelor's students are based at the Le Bouveret campus on the shores of Lake Geneva. In their final year students transfer to the campus in Brig, also in the canton of Valais.

For Undergraduate students, a dual bachelor's degree in Culinary Arts is offered in partnership with University of Derby, U.K. Students can choose between 2 pathways allowing them to focus on Pastry, Bakery & Chocolate or Culinary Arts. The Bachelor's program also includes 2 internships, allowing students to gain a year's professional work experience during their studies.

Postgraduate students can undertake a dual Master's degree in Culinary Management, also offered in partnership with University of Derby, U.K.

Shorter professional programs are also available, including a 15-month Swiss Grand Diploma and 2-year Swiss Higher Diploma programs.

== History ==
Culinary Arts Academy Switzerland was established in 2006 and forms part of the Swiss Education Group. It developed from the same institution originally founded in 1991 as a hospitality management school in Lucerne.

The school’s lineage dates back to 1991, when a hospitality management college known as Domino Carlton Tivoli International Hotel Management Career Centre first welcomed students to its campus in Lucerne, located in the Carlton-Tivoli Hotel overlooking Lake Lucerne. During its early years, the institution developed academic partnerships with universities including Johnson & Wales University and Lynn University, and introduced its first specialized culinary courses.

In 1996, the institution was restructured and became DCT International Hotel & Business Management School following a change in ownership. Under this new structure, DCT expanded its academic portfolio to include programmes in European Gourmet Cuisine, Pastry, and Chocolate, alongside its existing hospitality management diplomas. It also established partnerships with Florida International University and the University of Massachusetts - Amherst.. Its European Culinary Management programme became the first outside the United States to receive full accreditation from the American Culinary Federation. .

In 2003, DCT relocated from Lucerne to Vitznau, where it continued to expand its academic offerings, including the introduction of an MBA in Hospitality Management and a Master Gourmet Culinary Arts programme. During this period, its culinary programme was recognized by the American Culinary Federation as an “Exemplary Program,” becoming the only such designation outside North America at the time.

In 2011, Swiss Education Group acquired DCT University Center. The following year, the institution was renamed Culinary Arts Academy Switzerland, marking the formal establishment of the current academy and its repositioning as a specialized culinary school. Operations were expanded to Le Bouveret, where the school shared a campus with César Ritz Colleges Switzerland.

In 2012, the Lucerne campus was relocated within the city centre, then closed in 2022. Academic programmes were subsequently consolidated across the academy’s two campuses in Le Bouveret and Brig, in the canton of Valais.

In 2025, César Ritz Colleges Switzerland consolidated its operations in Brig, and Culinary Arts Academy Switzerland assumed full use of the Le Bouveret campus.

== Accreditations & Certifications ==
- American Culinary Federation (ACF), North America’s leading professional association for chefs, awarded to CAAS in 2026. Recognized by the Council for Higher Education Accreditation (CHEA), this award reflects CAAS's commitment to world-class culinary education
- eduQua
- UN Tourism TedQual
- World Association of Chefs Societies
- Federation of Swiss Private Schools
- COBIS - Council of British International Schools

== Rankings ==
Quacquarelli Symonds / QS World University Rankings -

Hospitality and Leisure category
	2020	2021	2022	2023	2024	2025	2026
Position	21	8	8	8	7	8	9

Since 2021, Culinary Arts Switzerland ranks as #1 Culinary School in Switzerland

== See also ==
- César Ritz Colleges
- HIM Business School
- Swiss Hotel Management School
- Swiss Education Group
- List of Hospitality Management Schools in Switzerland
