= Anton Mosimann =

Swiss chef and restaurateur

Anton Mosimann OBE, DL
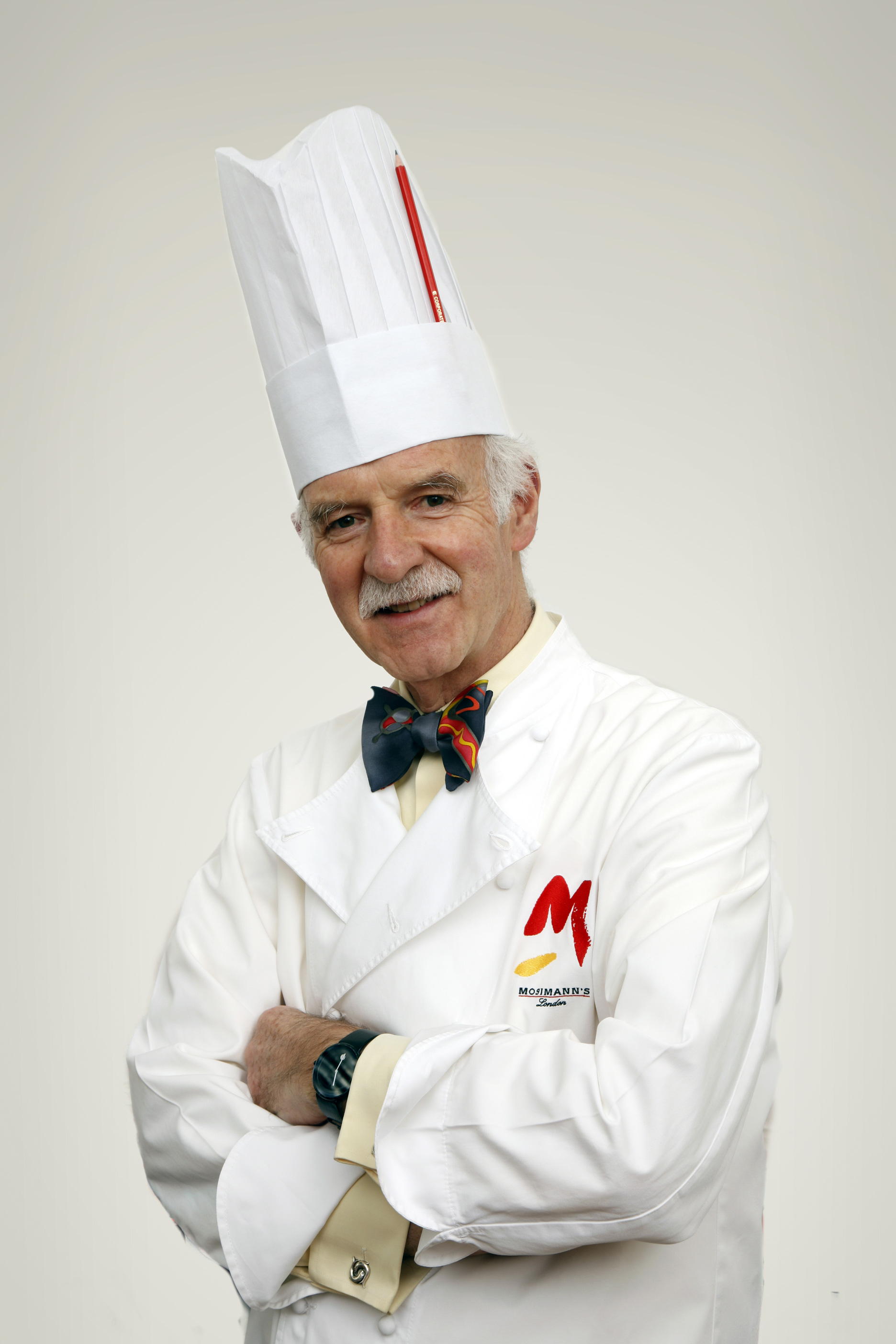
- Mosimann in 2010
- Born: Anton Mosimann; 23 February 1947 (age 79); Solothurn, Kanton Solothurn
- Children: Philipp; Mark
- Culinary career
- Cooking style: cuisine naturelle
- Television shows
- Anton Goes to Sheffield (1985); Cooking with Mosimann (1990); Anton Mosimann – Naturally (1991–1992)
- Website: www.mosimann.com

Anton Mosimann OBE DL (born 23 February 1947) is a Swiss chef and restaurateur who was Maitre Chef des Cuisines at the Dorchester Hotel for thirteen years, during which time its restaurant achieved a rating of two stars in the Michelin Guide. After leaving The Dorchester Mosimann took over a private dining club called The Belfrey and created Mosimann's, a cookery school, and other enterprises in the hospitality industry. He has also presented television programmes in the UK and Switzerland. In 2016 a museum dedicated to his life and culinary arts was opened in the campus of Culinary Arts Academy Switzerland, located on the shores of Lake Geneva (lac Léman), in the town of Le Bouveret.

Mosimann terms his culinary style cuisine naturelle as it emphasises healthy and natural ingredients, avoiding additions of fat and alcohol.

== Early life and career ==
Mosimann was born on 23 February 1947 in Solothurn, in the foothills of the Swiss Jura, to Otto and Helga Mosimann. From his childhood he assisted in a restaurant that his parents ran in Nidau. He was an only child.

When he was 15 he began an apprenticeship at a local hotel - Hotel Bären Twann, and he received his diploma as a chef de cuisine at the age of 25.

During his twenties he worked at hotels in Rome, Montreal, Japan and Belgium. During Expo '70 in Japan Mosimann was Head Chef at the Swiss Pavilion.

== The Dorchester ==
Mosimann was appointed Maitre Chef de Cuisines at London's Dorchester Hotel in 1975, when he was only 28 years old. His predecessor, Eugène Käufeler, had asked for advice on the appointment from Adelrich Furrer, a Swiss expert on gastronomy. Mosimann had come to Furrer's attention when he won a gold medal for his cooking, at a competition in Lucerne. When the Dorchester's restaurant achieved a two star rating in the Michelin Guide it was the first hotel restaurant outside France to do so.

== Cuisine naturelle ==
Mosimann has said "I created what I call cuisine naturelle. Its main characteristic is that it does without such ingredients as butter, cream, and alcohol. The focus is concentrated even more on the flavour of the individual ingredients. The dishes are only lightly cooked. In nouvelle cuisine and also cuisine naturelle, enormous emphasis is put on the presentation of the dishes." His book, Cuisine Naturelle, was published in 1985.

== Later career ==
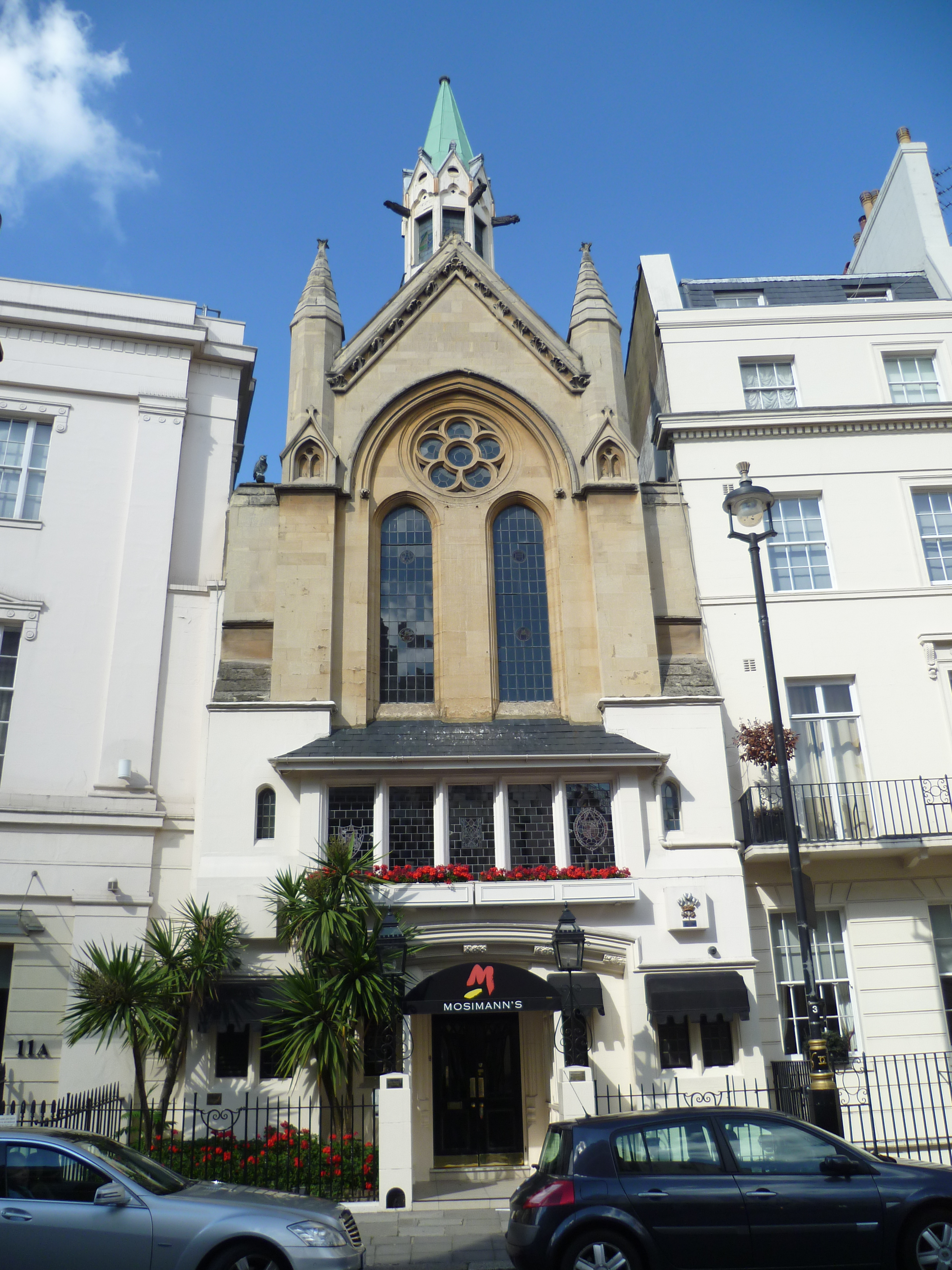
Mosimann's private dining club in Belgravia, London

After leaving the Dorchester Mosimann opened a private dining club in a converted Scottish Presbyterian church in Belgravia in 1988. His business interests also include Mosimann's Academy and Mosimann's Party Service. In 2000, he received the Royal Warrant of Appointment to HRH The Prince of Wales for catering.

His English television work includes the Food and Drink special Anton Goes to Sheffield in 1985, which won a Glenfiddich Award in 1986, Cooking with Mosimann in 1990, and Anton Mosimann – Naturally from 1991 to 1992.

Mosimann has cooked for five British prime ministers at No. 10 Downing Street for visiting heads of state, he has cooked for four presidents of the United States of America and four generations of the British royal family. In 2011, he was chosen to cook for the 300 guests at the evening reception of the wedding of Prince William, Duke of Cambridge, and Catherine Middleton in Buckingham Palace. In 2016 The Culinary Arts Academy of Switzerland opened a three-storey wing in Le Bouveret, on the shores of Lake Geneva, with a permanent display of The Mosimann Collection of Culinary Heritage. His extensive library of cookery books is displayed alongside over fifty gold medals he won at various international competitions and an array of memorabilia reflecting his long and illustrious career. As he quipped at the launch: "What a privilege to be alive when a museum dedicated to you is opened!" It was fitting that it should open the same year that he was awarded the Lifetime Achievement Award Hotelympia.

Mosimann visited the V. M. Salgaocar Institute of International Hospitality Education in Goa, India, on 7 January 2023 as a special guest and demonstrated some dishes to the students.

== Honours ==
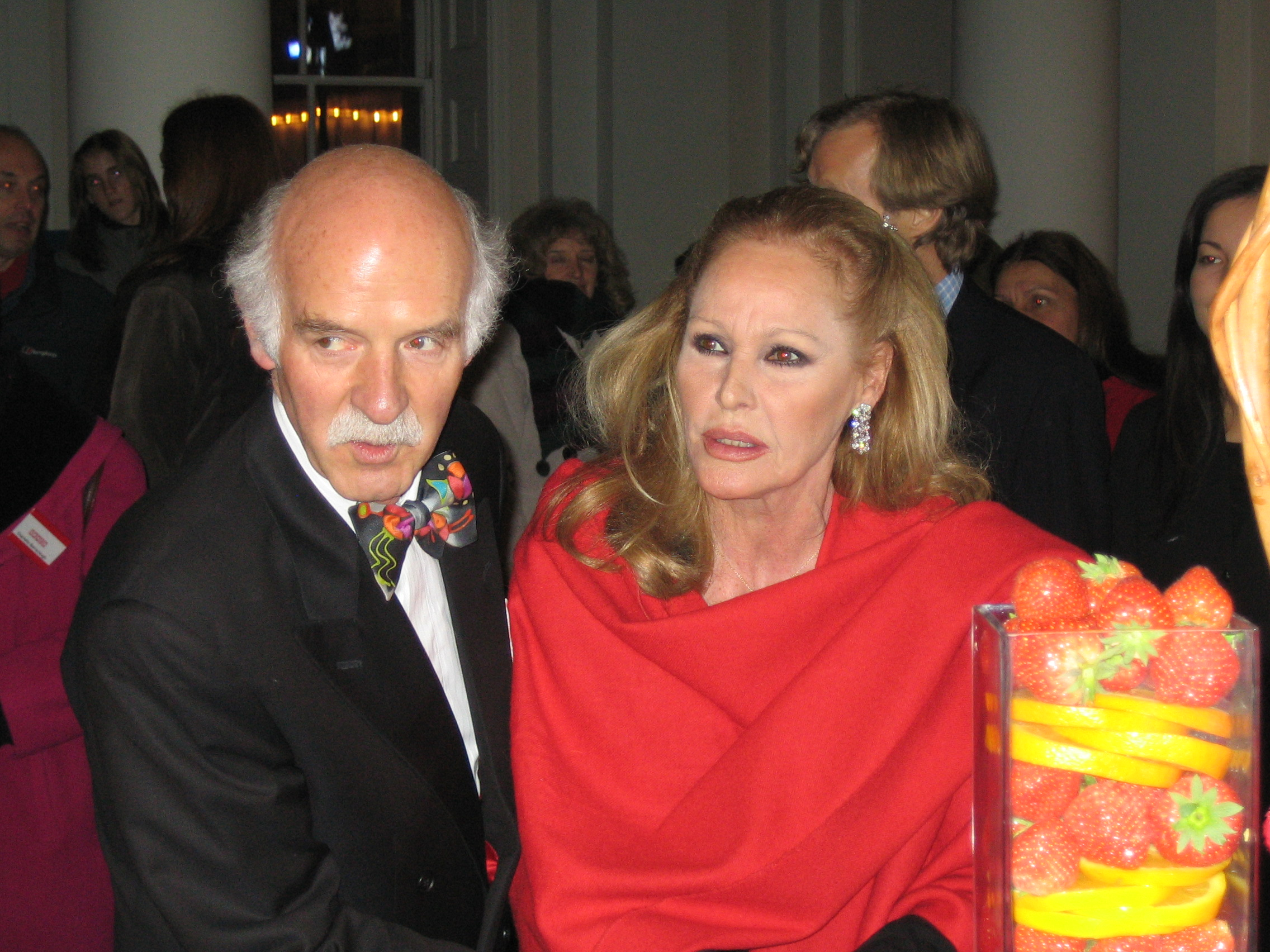
Mosimann with Ursula Andress at Somerset House (2004)

In 2004 Mosimann was created an Officer of the Order of the British Empire (OBE), "For services to the Tourist and Food Industries". and the Catering Industry's Lifetime Achievement Award. ITV's This Morning included Mosimann as one of the UK's six iconic chefs in 2007. He is also a chevalier of the French Ordre National du Mérite Agricole. and was appointed a Deputy Lieutenant of Greater London in 2011. In 2011 he received the Carl-Freidrich von Rumohr Lifetime achievement award from the Gastronomic Academy Deutschlands eV and was awarded Médaille du Mérite, Société Suisses des Cuisiniers 2012 and the Gastronomische Akademie Deutschlands Rumohr Ring, 2013.

== Selected publications ==
- Cuisine à la Carte, 1981
- A New Style of Cooking, 1983
- Cuisine Naturelle, 1985
- Anton Mosimann's Fish Cuisine, 1988
- The Art of Mosimann, 1989
- Cooking with Mosimann, 1989
- Anton Mosimann – Naturally, 1991
- The Essential Mosimann, 1993
- Mosimann's World, 1996
- Natürlich, leichtes Kochen mit Anton Mosimann, 1996
- Mosimann's Kulinarische Schweiz, 1998
- Mosimann's Vegetarische Küche, 1999
- Mosimann's Natürliche Küche, 2001
- Mosimann's Fresh, 2006
- 25 Years Mosimann, 2013
- Life is a circus, autobiography 2017, Anton Mosimann/Willi Näf

== See also ==
- Swiss cuisine
