= Hotel & Gastro Union =

Swiss trade union

The Hotel & Gastro Union (HGU) is a trade union representing workers in the hospitality industry in Switzerland.

The union was founded in 1886 in Lucerne, as the Winkelried Association. The following year, it became the Union Helvetia. The largest Swiss hospitality union, it had 1,364 members by 1898, and was strongest among waiters, cooks and hotel staff. It represented only Swiss nationals, and set up overseas branches for those working abroad. In 1909, it set the SHL Schweizerische Hotelfachschule Luzern hotel management school.

In 1918, the union was a founding affiliate of the Confederation of Swiss Employees' Associations (VSA). Its membership grew, reaching 9,047 in 1950, and 17,728 in 1997. In 2000, it renamed itself as the "Hotel & Gastro Union".

In 2002, the VSA merged into Travail.Suisse, of which the HGU was a founding affiliate. In 2009, it absorbed the Swiss Association of Bakery and Confectionery Staff. By 2019, it had 18,372 members.
