= Basel School of Business =

School in Basel, Switzerland

Coordinates: 47.548485°N 7.589777°E

BSB - The Basel School of Business
- Other name: BSB
- Motto: An Innovative Approach to Business Education™
- Type: Private
- Established: 2012
- Academic affiliations: IACBE, UNPRME, eduqua
- Dean: Philip Weinberg
- Academic staff: 18
- Location: Basel, Switzerland
- Colors: Black and Red
- Mascot: Appenzeller
- Website: www.thebaselschool.ch

The Basel School of Business (also known as BSB) is a private business school in Basel, Switzerland. Founded in 2012, it offers a range of undergraduate and postgraduate programs in Business Administration. BSB is known for its focus on Practical Experiential Learning™ (PEL), an approach that combines theoretical education with hands-on experience to bridge academia and industry.

== History ==
2012 BSB receives a license as a private school on May 22, 2012, by the Canton of Basel City.

2012 Launch of the Master of Business Administration (MBA) programs.

2013 Moved from the original Gartenstrasse location to the Centralbahnplatz in Basel.

2015 Launch of the Bachelor of Science in International Business program.

2015 The first MBA cohort graduated.

2015 The Basel School of Business receives institution-wide certification from Swiss quality label for further education institutions.

2016 The Bachelor of Science in International Business program is added.

2018 The Basel School of Business is accredited by the International Accreditation Council for Business Education (IACBE) and the Council for Higher Education Accreditation (CHEA).

2018 The Basel School of Business receives continued institution-wide certification from Swiss quality label for further education institutions.

2018 Undergraduate students from the Basel School of Business in collaboration with Ballet Theater Basel and Loop Tanz produce "Dance for MS," a fundraising performance to spread awareness for Multiple Sclerosis.

2020 The Basel School of Business creates a Grocery Shopping Assistance program for vulnerable populations during the COVID-19 lockdown.

2022 Within 2 weeks of the start of the Ukrainian Invasion, BSB students and faculty establish Switzerland's largest collection station and delivered over 40 tons of relief supplies to Ukraine.

2022 The school creates and operates "PhilMart" to provide food, clothing, and other basic necessities to Ukrainian refugees.

2022 The Basel School of Business receives continued institution-wide certification from Swiss quality label for further education institutions.

== Academic programs ==
BSB offers a Bachelor of Science in Business Administration on-campus degree, a Bachelor of Business Administration (Top-Up) degree completion program, a flexible Master of Business Administration (MBA) degree, and a cohort based management Executive Master of Business Administration degree.

The Bachelor of Science in Business Administration (BSBA) program is a three-year full-time on-campus program. The BSBA combines a liberal-arts based core curriculum with specializations in various business disciplines including: Accounting & Finance, Human Resource Management, Global Marketing, International Business, and International Hospitality Management. The Bachelor of Business Administration (Top-Up) program allows students with an accredited higher national diploma to earn a bachelor's degree by completing a 27-credit upper-level undergraduate sequence of courses. The BBA can be taken online or on-campus, full-time or part-time.

The Basel School of Business offers a 36-credit Master of Business Administration (MBA) program. The MBA curriculum consists of three components, a business core, an area of specialization and a capstone. The areas of specialization include: International Business, Pharmaceutical Management, Healthcare Management, International Hospitality Management, Organizational Systems and Change, and Transformational Marketing.

== Philosophy ==
BSB's approach to education is guided by the principle of Practical Experiential Learning (PEL). This philosophy promotes active engagement and real-world problem solving, blending practical work experiences with traditional academic instruction.

== Accreditations ==
BSB programs are accredited by the International Assembly for Collegiate Business Education (IACBE) and the Council for Higher Education Accreditation (CHEA). BSB is certified by Swiss quality label for further education institutions (EduQua).

== Affiliations ==
The Basel School of Business is a signatory to the United Nations' PRME - Principles for Responsible Management Education initiative.
