= HTMi =

Private educational institute in Sörenberg, Switzerland

HTMi Switzerland
- Hotel and Tourism Management Institute Switzerland
- Motto: Come as a Student, Become a Manager
- Type: Private
- Established: 1999
- Affiliations: University of Ulster; Edinburgh Napier University
- President: Ian R. J. Larmour
- Academic staff: 20
- Administrative staff: 11
- Students: 375
- Undergraduates: 320
- Postgraduates: 55
- Location: (Switzerland); Sörenberg in UNESCO Entlebuch Biosphere, Switzerland; 46.823°N 8.033°E
- Colors: Red, blue, white
- Website: www.htmi.ch

HTMi, Hotel and Tourism Management Institute Switzerland is a private educational institute that offers undergraduate and postgraduate academic degrees. The institute provides hospitality management development courses and has its campus in Sörenberg, Switzerland. Each semester the institute has approximately 200 students from more than 35 nationalities, of which a similar number of additional students concurrently undertake work placements. The institute is organised into six centres:

- The School of International Hotel and Tourism Management
- The Centre for Career Management
- The International Hospitality Research Centre Switzerland
- The Centre for Culinary Management
- The Centre for Events Management Training
- The Student Service Centre

The school has two main buildings in Sörenberg which provide classrooms, training restaurants, accommodation and offices. These are Hotel Campus Mariental and Hotel Campus Panorama.

== History ==
HTMi was established as a private hotel school in late 1990 in the UK where it began with a few students and moved from Scotland to Bournemouth. In 1999, it was decided that the school could not compete in the UK against the big Swiss hotel schools. In 1999, the management team planned a relocation strategy. Robert Larmour launched HTMi in Sörenberg, Switzerland. HTMi started with 16 students from two nationalities; now it has approximately 420 students in Switzerland from 35 nationalities.

The Institute enhanced its range of qualifications offered with the introduction of a BA degree from the University of Ulster, in 2004. This program ran until 2007, when it was replaced with BSc (Hons) International Hotel and Tourism Management, also validated and awarded by the University of Ulster. HTMi added a Masters level qualification to its portfolio in 2006 with the introduction of the MBA Hospitality, awarded by Queen Margaret University, Edinburgh. This was replaced in 2012 by the Master of Science in International Hospitality and Tourism Management, validated and awarded by Edinburgh Napier University.

== Courses and programmes ==
The educational institute offers a number of courses, all taught in English, as follows:

=== Certificate courses ===
- Certificate in International Hotel and Tourism Operations
- Diploma in International Hotel and Tourism Management
- Higher Diploma in International Hotel and Tourism Management
- Diploma in Training for Trainers in Hotel Management - Specialisation Course

=== Undergraduate programmes ===
- BSc (Hons) International Hotel and Tourism Management (awarded by University of Ulster)

=== Postgraduate programmes ===
- Advanced Diploma / PgD in European Baking and Pastry Arts - Specialisation Course
- Postgraduate Diploma in International Hotel and Tourism Management
- Postgraduate Diploma in Events Management
- MA Hotel Business Management and MA Postgraduate Diploma in Hotel Business Management (Double Award)
- MBA in Hospitality Management and MBA Postgraduate Diploma in Hospitality Management (Double Award)
- Master's Dissertation Course
- Joint Degree: MSc International Hospitality and Tourism Management (awarded by Edinburgh Napier University) & MBA in Hospitality Management and MBA Postgraduate Diploma in Hospitality Management (awarded by HTMi) (Triple Award)
- Executive MBA in Hotel Management, includes Exec. MBA Postgraduate Certificate in Hotel Management, Exec. MBA Postgraduate Diploma in Hotel Management (Triple Award)

== Research conference ==
The International Hospitality Research Centre Switzerland, based at HTMi, organises the International Hospitality & Tourism Research Conference Switzerland - IHTRCS, twice per year at HTMi in Sörenberg and in Luzern. Papers are presented by students and staff on contemporary issues in hospitality and tourism.

== Recognition ==
The external quality control of the courses offered at HTMi is exercised through Swiss, UK and International bodies. For example, in Switzerland this is carried out by the EDUQUA certification. In the UK, The Institute of Hospitality - IOH, formerly known as the HCIMA, requires a quinquennial resubmission of all the Degree and Sub-degree courses. This is subject to a panel-based review by specialists in the field. In addition, the British Accreditation Council also conducts a quinquennial review of the schools provision, via an onsite inspection. HTMi is, however, not accredited within Switzerland.

== See also ==
- List of Hospitality Management Schools in Switzerland
