= Swiss Institute for Management and Hospitality =

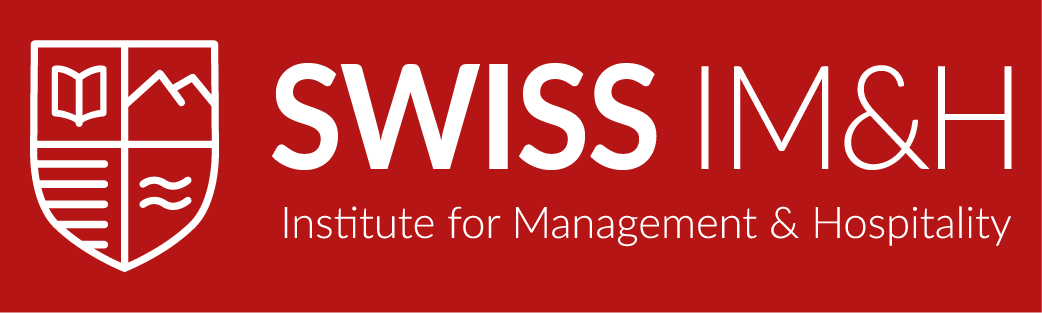

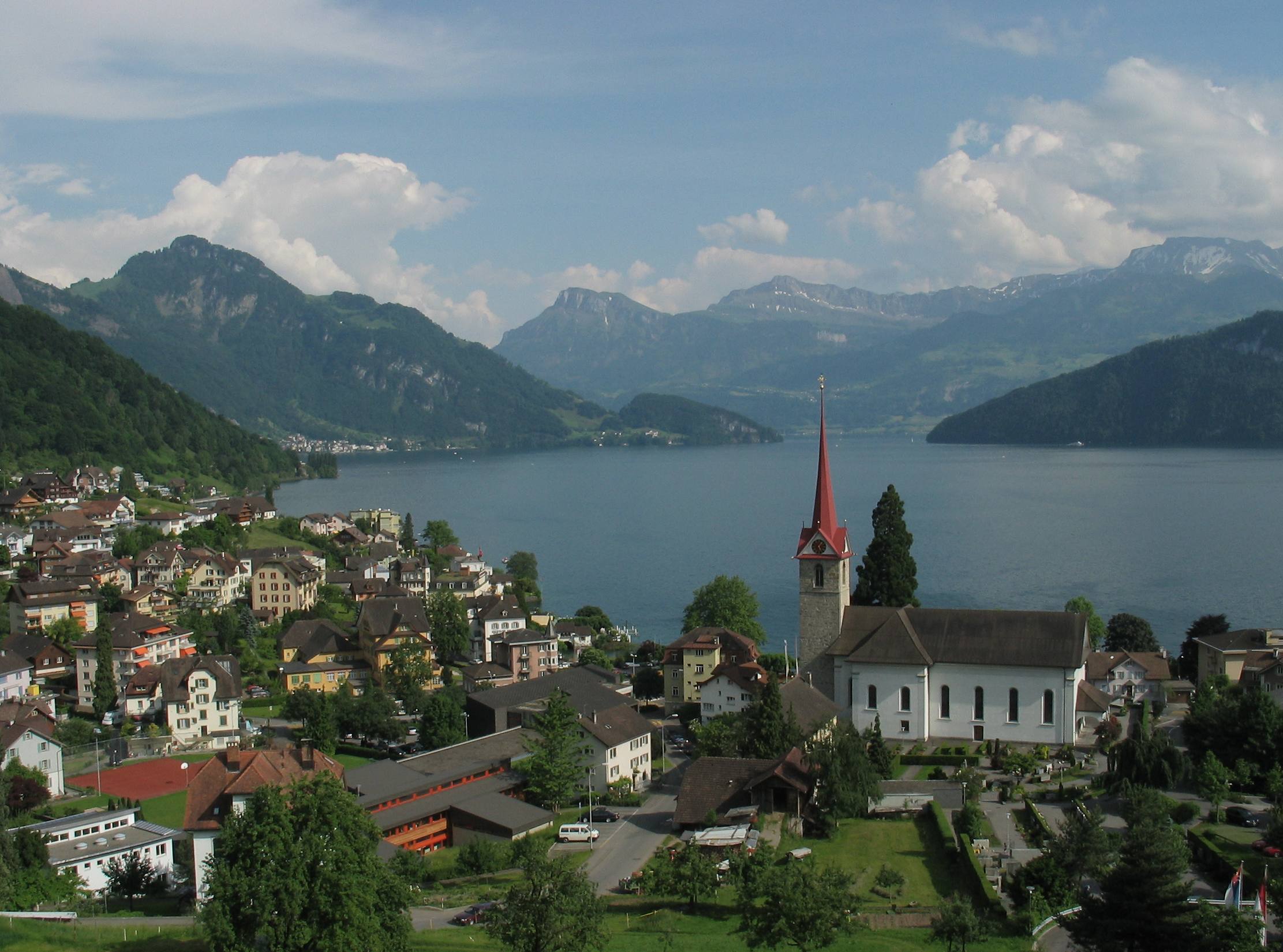
- A view from SWISS IM&H

Location
- Switzerland; 47°01′28.7″N 8°27′38.2″E

Information
- Other name: SWISS IM&H
- Type: Private Institution
- Language: English
- Website: www.swissimh.ch www.swisseducationalcollege.ch

The Swiss Institute for Management and Hospitality (SWISS IM&H) is an English-medium culinary and hospitality management school in Switzerland. The Swiss Institute for Management and Hospitality is located in the city of Weggis, a municipality in the district of Lucerne in the canton of Lucerne. The school offers Culinary Management Courses and a bachelor's degree (BBA) & Masters' Degree (MBA) in Hospitality Management.

== Campus & Facilities ==
In January 2012, SWISS IM&H expanded its space and facilities at Kantonstrasse 85, 6353 Weggis, occupying the entire fourth level of the building located by the shore of Lake Lucerne. Following each semester, students have the opportunity to engage in 4–6 months of work experience within the hospitality industry. SWISS IM&H provides diploma programs up to an MBA level for students starting from the age of 18.

== Partnerships ==
British Hospitality Association (BHA), American Hotel & Lodging Educational Institute (AH&LA), International and Euro CHRIE, West Coast University (WCU), International University of Business Agriculture and Technology (IUBAT) have signed agreements of collaboration with SWISS IM&H in 2012.

== Academic programs ==
It offers Undergraduate Programs in Culinary Management and Hospitality Management, and Postgraduate programs in Hospitality Management.

== See also ==
- List of Hospitality Management Schools in Switzerland
