= IMI International Management Institute Switzerland =

Business school in Kastanienbaum-Luzern, Switzerland

Coordinates: 47.0069°N 8.3372°E

- IMI Switzerland
- Motto: Aiming For Excellence in International Hospitality Management.
- Type: Hospitality and Business school
- Established: August, 1991
- Affiliations: Manchester Metropolitan University, United Kingdom, Confederation of Tourism and Hospitality, BAC, eduQua, QQQ
- President: Heinz Buerki
- Faculty: 30
- Students: 400 per year, In-house: 200, in internship: 200
- Undergraduates: 360
- Postgraduates: 40 MSc, PgD
- Location: Kastanienbaum-Luzern, Switzerland
- Campus: Kastanienbaum, Luzern
- Website: http://www.imi-luzern.com

IMI International Management Institute, Switzerland is a private hospitality school offering programmes from Foundation level to Master of Science.

It offers students the opportunity to undertake paid, practical internships as part of their programme either in Switzerland or internationally. It is one of Switzerland's smaller private hotel schools (with a maximum of 200 students per semester) and aims to offer students a highly personalised educational experience.

The school has over 30 years of offering Swiss hospitality education and was named in the top 20 providers of hospitality management education in the 2025 QS World University Rankings.

== Programs ==
- Certificate in Hotel & Tourism Management
- BA (Hons) International Hospitality Business Management
- BA (Hons) International Culinary Management
- BA (Hons) International Business Management
- MSc in International Hospitality Business Management
- Graduate Diploma in International Hospitality Management
- Graduate Diploma in International Culinary Arts

== History ==
In August 1991 the International Management Institute was founded at the Hotel Waldstaetten in Weggis with 55 students. By 1995 180 students per semester were being taught at IMI. In 1997 the current campus was launched in Kastanienbaum 12 bus minutes away from Lucerne. Today, around 200 students are studying each academic semester at IMI.

== Campuses ==
=== IMI Campus ===
IMI Kastanienbaum campus is overlooked by Pilatus (mountain) and is situated on the banks of Lake Lucerne.

== Notable alumni ==
- Princess Bendara of Yogyakarta

== See also ==
- List of Hospitality Management Schools in Switzerland
