= Sustainability Management School =

Swiss business school

Sustainability Management School (SUMAS)
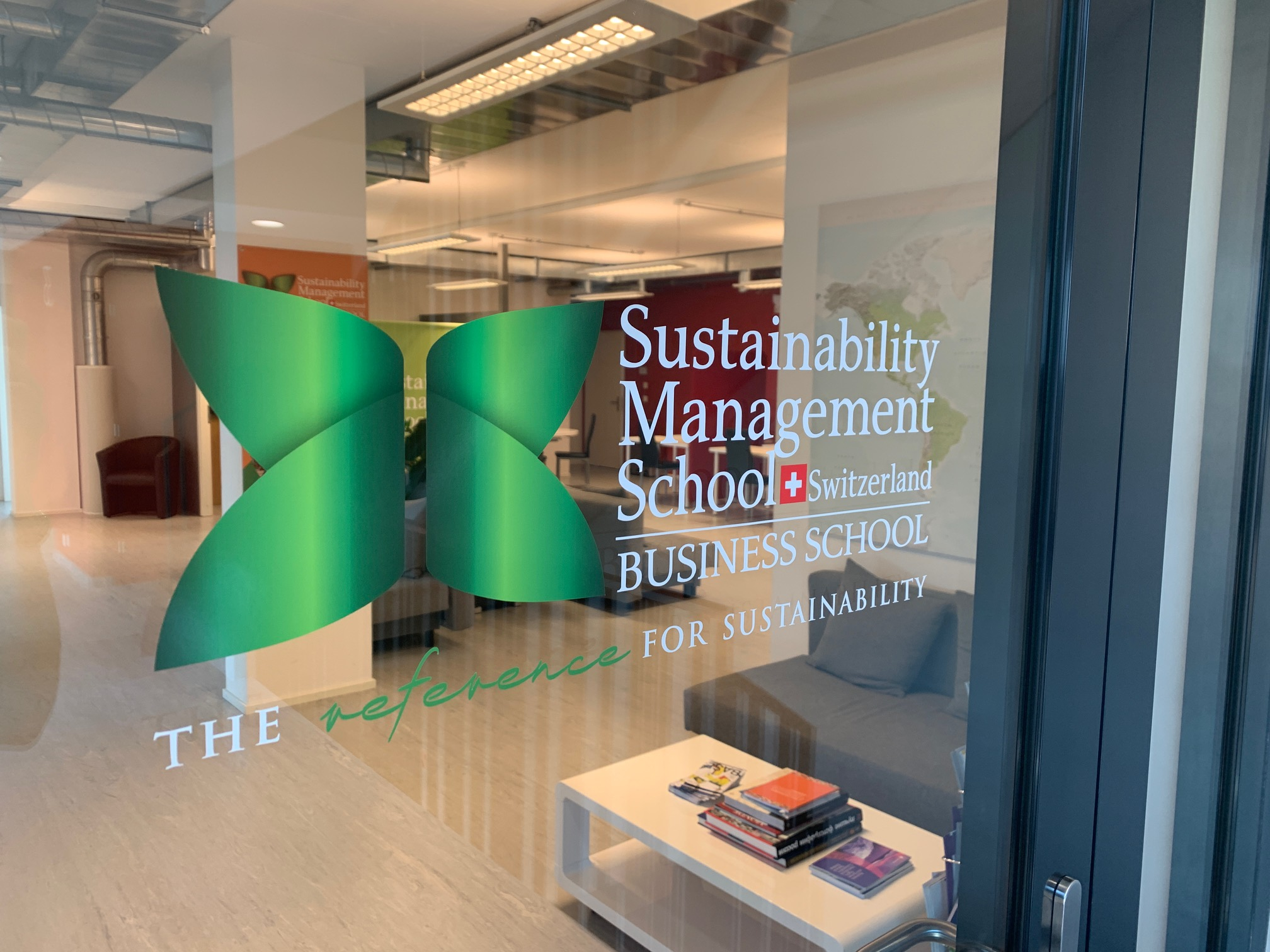
- SUMAS Logo
- Motto: Inspiring Innovative Leaders
- Type: Private business school
- Established: 2012
- Academic affiliations: Accreditation Council for Business Schools and Programs, Swiss Private School Register
- President: Ivana Modena
- Academic staff: +40
- Administrative staff: +22
- Doctoral students: +10
- Location: Gland, Switzerland; 46.41558500457018°N 6.278518206306375°E
- Campus: Gland & Milan
- Language: English
- Colors: Green
- Website: www.sumas.ch

Sustainability Management School (SUMAS) is a private business school focused on sustainability and a responsible management education (UN Sustainable Development Knowledge Program, Voluntary Initiative). This training center was founded in 2012 by Ivana Modena with the mission of Inspiring Innovative Leaders.

SUMAS's main campus is located just across from the center hosting International Union for Conservation of Nature (IUCN) and World Wide Fund for Nature (WWF), in Gland in the French-speaking part of Switzerland. Moreover, the school has recently opened its second campus in Milan, Italy, in which students can attend all bachelor programs as well as graduate programs specializing in Sustainability Management and Sustainable Fashion Management.

== Programs ==
SUMAS offers private degree programs for different educational programs to all students coming of different ages, and up to IBCP and Bachelors, Masters, MBA, and Doctoral Degrees.

=== Undergraduate programs ===
- Bachelor of Business Administration (BBA) in Sustainability Management.
- Bachelor of Business Administration (BBA) in Sustainable Finance and AI Innovations.
- Bachelor of Business Administration (BBA) in Sustainable Hospitality and Tourism Management.
- Bachelor of Business Administration (BBA) in Sustainable Fashion Management.

=== Graduate programs ===
==== Master's programs ====
All Master's programs are offered both on-campus and online.

- Master in Sustainability Management (MAM)
- Master in Sustainable Fashion Management (MAM)
- Master in Sustainable Hospitality and Tourism Management (MAM)

==== MBA programs ====
All MBA programs are offered both on-campus and online.

- Master of Business Administration (MBA) in Sustainability Management
- Master of Business Administration (MBA) in Sustainable Fashion Management
- Master of Business Administration (MBA) in Sustainable Finance and AI Innovations
- Master of Business Administration (MBA) in Sustainable Hospitality and Tourism Management

==== Doctorate programs ====
- Doctorate of Business Administration (DBA) in Sustainability Management

==== Other programs ====
- Certificate of Advance Studies (CAS).
- International Baccalaureate Career-related Programme (IBCP) in Business & Sustainability.

== Accreditation, memberships, and achievements ==
=== Accreditation ===
Sustainability Management School holds the Programmatic private accreditation granted by the Accreditation Council for Business Schools and Programs (ACBSP) in 2016 in Gland, Switzerland and in 2023 in Milan, Italy.

=== Affiliations and memberships ===
- R20 Regions of Climate Action (R20)
- Principles for Responsible Management Education (PRME)
- The United Nations Global Compact (UNGC) initiative, both Swiss and Russian networks.
- Member of Swiss Private School Register. 3 ^{search display}

=== Ranking ===
The school's Online MBA in Sustainability Management was named 18th among The 23 Best Online MBA Programs in Sustainability for 2017–2018. Moreover, Sustainability Management School achieved 4 out of 5 QS Quacarelli Simonds Stars in 2017.

== Campuses ==
=== Switzerland ===
SUMAS is headquartered in the city of Gland, between Geneva and Lausanne. Its Swiss campus is located just across from the center hosting WWF, the IUCN and Ramsar

=== Italy ===
SUMAS opened in February 2020 its brand new campus in Milan, Italy. Located in the heart of Milan’s fashion, art, and design district, students can attend Sustainability Management and Sustainable Fashion Management programs in this campus.
