= UBIS University =

Private university in Washington, D.C.

University of Business, Innovation, and Sustainability
- Former names: University of Business and International Studies (2006–2022)
- Type: Private
- Established: 2006 (as University of Business and International Studies)
- Location: Washington, D.C., United States
- Campus: Online-only
- Accreditations: International Accreditation Council for Business Education (IACBE); Higher Education Licensure Commission (HELC)
- Website: ubisglobal.com

The University of Business, Innovation, and Sustainability (UBIS), formerly known as the University of Business and International Studies, is a private higher education institution based in Washington, D.C., United States. Originally established in Geneva, Switzerland, in 2006, the institution relocated its headquarters to Washington, D.C., and changed its name in 2022. UBIS specializes in online undergraduate, graduate, and doctoral-level programs in business administration and international relations.

== History ==
UBIS was initially founded in Geneva, Switzerland, in 2006. In December 2022, UBIS officially relocated its headquarters and primary campus to Washington, D.C., United States. This transition included a name change to the University of Business, Innovation, and Sustainability. UBIS is part of the Linden Education Group, a consortium of universities based in the United States.

== Academics ==
UBIS offers online programs at the bachelor’s, master’s, and doctoral levels. Fields of study include business administration and international relations. Degree offerings are accredited by the IACBE and include:

- Bachelor in Business Administration (BBA)
- Bachelor in International Relations (BAIR)
- Master in Business Administration (MBA)
- Master in International Relations (MAIR)
- Doctor of Business Administration (DBA)

== Accreditation and recognition ==
UBIS holds accreditation from the International Accreditation Council for Business Education (IACBE) for several of its academic programs, which it has held since 2013. IACBE is recognized by the Council for Higher Education Accreditation (CHEA).

The institution is licensed to operate in Washington, D.C., by the Higher Education Licensure Commission (HELC).

In 2024, UBIS announced a partnership with Woolf University, through which Woolf degrees offered by UBIS are recognized in 49 European Higher Education Area (EHEA) countries.

== See also ==
- List of institutions not listed as Accredited Swiss Higher Education Institutions according to HEdA
