= Swiss Hotel Management School =

Hospitality school in Caux and Leysin, Switzerland

- Type: Hospitality school
- Established: 1992
- Parent institution: Swiss Education Group
- Accreditation: University of Derby, Apple Inc. Distinguished School, COBIS Council of British International Schools, Chartered Society of Designers, EduQua Swiss quality label for further education institutions, Federation of Swiss Private Schools
- Dean: Patrick Taffin d'Heursel
- Students: 2020
- Undergraduates: 1234
- Postgraduates: 485
- Location: Rue du Panorama 2, Caux, 1824
- Campus: Caux & Leysin
- Colors: Green, Gold and White
- Website: www.shms.com/en/

Swiss Hotel Management School (SHMS) is a private hospitality management school in Caux and Leysin, Switzerland. As a traditional hospitality school, it educates and trains students in hotel management and in the hospitality and tourism industries. The school offers one bachelor's program, two master's programs, a postgraduate diploma, and an online Executive Master of Hospitality Management.

SHMS was ranked in top 4 worldwide for hospitality and leisure management in the 2026 QS World University Rankings, making it the highest-ranked conventional hotel management school in the world.

== History ==
SHMS is based in Caux Palace, a historic Belle Époque palace hotel. Built on the Caux Mount by Swiss architect Eugène Jost, it was inaugurated on 7th July 1902.

Celebrities such as Prince Ibn Saud, Rudyard Kipling, John Paul Meagher, and the Maharajah of Baroda, visited and stayed there up until the Second World War. Afterwards, Caux-Palace played an instrumental role in worldwide peacebuilding and reconciliation efforts. Caux Palace became home to SHMS in 1994.

SHMS has a second campus in Leysin, which consists of the Mont-Blanc Palace and the Bélvedere hotels, connected by a private Skytrain. The Leysin campus was formerly the Club Med Hotel in Leysin, and was the first winter Club Med in the world.

== Education ==
SHMS has academic programs which combine practical elements from all aspects of the hospitality industry with management skills. It prepares students for senior international positions in the field through its different programs (Bachelor's, Master's, and Postgraduate Diploma).

=== Undergraduate programs ===
3 years: Swiss BA (Hons) Degree from Swiss Hotel Management School and British BA (Hons) Degree from the University of Derby in

- Hospitality Management
- Hospitality and Event Management
- Design Management

The first two years of the Bachelor program share the same modules, with the third year varying depending on the chosen pathway. All students following the undergraduate program complete the first two years of their studies on the Caux campus and move to the Leysin campus for their third year. Students on all pathways have the opportunity to share certain classes, work on group projects, and organize VIP banquets together. The three-year curriculum is awarded with a Bachelor’s degree accredited by the University of Derby, UK.

=== Postgraduate programs ===
The Postgraduate Diploma program has been designed in such a way that, upon successful completion, students may progress directly to the SHMS Master’s Programs.

=== Master's programs ===
MSc - Masters of Science in International Hospitality Management (in Partnership with University of Derby)

MA - Master of Arts in International Hotel Business Management

All Master’s programs are one year in length and provide students with the managerial and leadership skills required by the hospitality industry.

== Timeline ==
1992 The Swiss Hotel Management School (SHMS) was founded as a private hotel management school in Les Paccots.

1995 Move into the Caux Palace located in Montreux.

1998 Partnership established with the University of Derby (UK) for the awards of the Bachelor of Arts (Hons) degree and Master of Arts.

2001 The Swiss Hotel School Association (ASEH) recognized the programs offered at the Swiss Hotel Management School and granted full accreditation.

2004 Acquisition of the Mont-Blanc Palace and Belvédère hotels in Leysin and opening of the Leysin campus.

2006 Revalidation of the programs run in partnership with the University of Derby. The programs are the Bachelor of Arts (Hons) and Master of Arts.

2011 Launch of the Master of International Business in Resort and Spa Management programs. Opening of a student-managed spa with a public section in Leysin.

2012 Swiss EduQua qualification awarded; The ʻBuffet de la Gare’ in Caux, a student-run restaurant, opens to the public.

2013 Launch of the Master of Science in International Hospitality Management, building on the success of the Master of Arts in International Hospitality Management.

2017 SHMS earns recognition as an Apple Distinguished School for the first time.

2026

- SHMS's Master of Arts strengthened with a more focused Hospitality Operations Management direction, while it also introduces a new Luxury Brand Management direction to reflect a growing demand within the high-end sector.
- Strategic partnership with Cheng Chung Design (CCD) for SHMS Hospitality Design specialization, bringing students a direct exposure to real-industry insights and career opportunities

== Rankings ==
Quacquarelli Symonds / QS World University Rankings -

Hospitality and Leisure category
| | 2020 | 2021 | 2022 | 2023 | 2024 | 2025 | 2026 |
|---|---|---|---|---|---|---|---|
| Position | 5 | 4 | 3 | 3 | 2 | 3 | 4 |

== See also ==
- HIM Business School
- César Ritz Colleges
- Culinary Arts Academy Switzerland
- Swiss Education Group
- International Hotel and Tourism Training Institute
- List of Hospitality Management Schools in Switzerland
