= Journal of Hospitality & Tourism Research =

- Discipline: Hospitality, tourism studies
- Language: English
- Edited by: Jean-Pierre van der Rest, Peter Kim, and Li Miao

Publication details
- Former name: Hospitality Research Journal
- History: 1976–present
- Publisher: Sage Publishing on behalf of the International Council on Hotel, Restaurant, and Institutional Education
- Frequency: 8/year
- Impact factor: 4.4 (2023)

Standard abbreviations
- ISO 4: J. Hosp. Tour. Res.

Indexing
- ISSN: 1096-3480 (print); 1557-7554 (web)
- LCCN: 97641552
- OCLC no.: 649627375

Links
- Journal homepage; Online access; Online archive

The Journal of Hospitality & Tourism Research (JHTR) is a peer-reviewed academic journal that covers research in the field of hospitality and tourism. Its editors-in-chief are Jean-Pierre van der Rest, Peter Kim, and Li Miao. It was established in 1976 as the Hospitality Research Journal, obtaining its current title in 1998, and is published by Sage Publishing on behalf of the International Council on Hotel, Restaurant, and Institutional Education.

== Editors ==
The following persons are or have been editors-in-chief:

- Tom Powers – Founding editor, 1976–1979
- Leo Renaghan, 1980–1982
- Abraham Pizam, 1983–1989
- Bob Bosselman and Jeff Fernsten (interim) 1989–1990
- Carolyn Lambert and Carl Riegel, 1990–1995
- Kaye Chon, 1996–2008
- Anna Mattila, 2009–2015
- Chris Roberts and Linda Shea, 2016–2020
- Jean-Pierre van der Rest, Peter Kim, and Li Miao, 2021–2025

== Abstracting and indexing ==
The journal is abstracted and indexed in Scopus and the Social Sciences Citation Index. According to the Journal Citation Reports, its 2023 impact factor is 4.4.
