= American Hotel and Lodging Association =

Trade group representing the U.S. hospitality industry

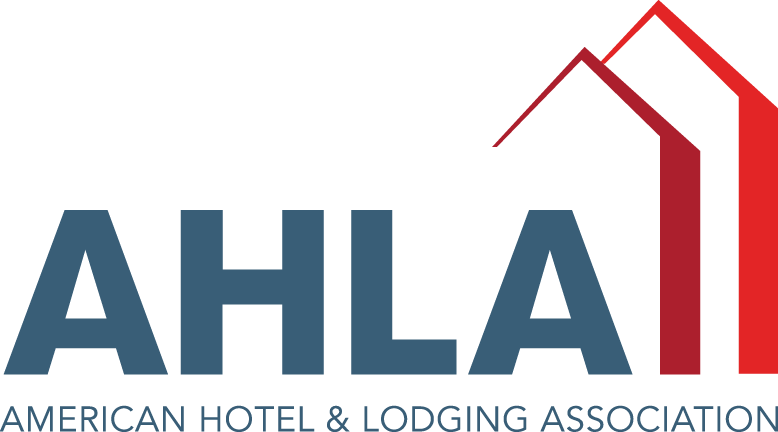
- Abbreviation: AHLA
- Predecessor: American Hotel Protective Association, 1910; American Hotel Association, 1917; American Hotel and Motel Association, 1962
- Formation: January 1, 1953 (73 years ago)
- Type: NGO
- Legal status: Trade association
- Purpose: Hospitality industry resource
- Headquarters: Washington, D.C., U.S.
- Location: 1250 Eye Street, NW. Suite 1100, 20005
- Coordinates: 38.901023°N 77.028464°W
- Official language: English
- Website: AH&LA

The American Hotel and Lodging Association (AHLA; formerly the American Hotel and Motel Association, and before that American Hotel Association) is an industry trade group that represents the U.S. hospitality industry. Its members include hotel brands, owners, management companies, Real Estate Investment Trusts (REITs), independent hotels, bed and breakfasts, state hotel associations and industry partners and suppliers.

AHLA's mission includes the publication of hotel directories, market research, support of standardization efforts, public and political advocacy for the interests of hotel owners, and the establishment or promotion of training programs and facilities for hotel personnel. The organization is actively engaged in lobbying efforts, notably opposition to short-term home sharing rental companies, such as Airbnb.

== History ==
The American Hotel Protective Association, founded in 1910 as a regional trade association in Chicago, became the American Hotel Association in 1917. The AHA's first president, Frank Dudley, identified rapid expansion of the US hotel industry as vulnerable to a shortage of trained personnel which could not be filled by the then-common practice of recruiting European hotel workers. With the backing of Ellsworth Milton Statler and of the Federal Board of Vocational Training, the group promoted college-level training in hotel management and the creation of the Cornell Hotel School at Cornell University under dean Howard Meek.

Hôteliers thrived during the Roaring Twenties; in 1928, the AHA Red Book listed 25,900 hotels with 1,525,000 rooms distributed widely across the US, with fewer hotels in the ex-Confederate South because racial segregation excluded many travellers, including African Americans. (These segregated travellers used the Negro Motorist Green Book to find accommodations.) Properties were forced to adapt to the newfound popularity of the motorcar, adding parking and establishing locations on main highways; the number of rooms in each newly constructed hotel was increasing. Prohibition hurt the hotel trade by cutting into revenue from food and beverage operations, but the Great Depression would prove disastrous for business. Overexpansion during the 1920s left excess inventory in the Depression era. The 1933 National Industrial Recovery Act, which sought to employ nationwide trade organisations to regulate wages and prices to halt a deflationary spiral, drew strong opposition from hotel owners (who saw it as a prelude to unionisation) and from the association. Fewer people were travelling overall and hotels were losing market share to less expensive "tourist courts", a new pattern of small clusters of hastily constructed cabins which were the predecessors of the early roadside motels. Two out of three US hotels went into receivership.

Initial attempts to include "tourist courts" in AHA's scope were doomed as the interests of the motel owners were in direct conflict with the existing hotels whose rates were being undercut by the new entrants. Various motel-specific groups, such as the American Motor Hotel Association, filled this gap. The motels were ultimately included in 1962 with AHA becoming AHMA, the American Hotel and Motel Association.

The American Hotel and Lodging Association now is significantly involved in lobbying on behalf of the hotel industry's goals.

== Agenda ==
In 1952, the AHA approached Mississippi State University to operate an extension training curriculum, the American Hotel Institute.

The association also proposed that members standardize various tasks within each hotel operation, from accounting to training and customer service, as a means to improve operational efficiency. As early as 1928, it worked with supplier groups to advocate standardization for tableware and porcelain china throughout the hotel.

The group's stance on tipping in hotels has varied from careful neutrality in the pre-World War I era (when unions were protesting that owners should pay their staff a fair wage instead of shifting the burden to the client) to advocating clients provide generous gratuities to a long list of personnel in its 2013 Gratuity Guide.

In response to complaints of overcharging for calls from in-room telephones, the association has supported the FCC's protection of a travellers' right to select which carrier provides operator services.

AHLA provides best practices and information about bed bugs. The organization has also supported market research to gauge user demand for specific amenities, such as fitness centres, in tourist hotels.

The organization hosts various committees, conventions and workshops. The American Hotel Association Directory Corporation, a subsidiary, published Lodging magazine and the Directory of Hotel and Motel Companies.

The American Hotel and Lodging Association has been one of the leading advocates of resort fees. Resort fees are extra mandatory fees that are not included in the advertised hotel price. A Federal Trade Commission (FTC) report from January 2017 said that resort fees are likely to harm consumers.

In addition to advocating for resort fees, the AHLA has entered the advocacy work against short-term home sharing. The AHLA has been doubled their political action committee (PAC) budget over two years (from 2014 to 2016). Many of the politicians who have received significant contributions from the American Hotel and Lodging Association PAC advocate for resort fees and against home sharing.

== American Hotel & Lodging Educational Institute ==
The American Hotel & Lodging Educational Institute (AHLEI) is a nonprofit member benefit of the AHLA. Established in 1953, it provides hospitality education, training and professional certification that serves the needs of hospitality schools and industries worldwide.

The AHLEI provides materials for all levels of hospitality personnel via: online learning, distance learning courses, videos, seminars, textbooks, and study guides. It certifies the competencies in conjunction with academia and industry experts for more than 20 positions in the hospitality industry, with designations ranging from the specialty to executive levels.

The AHELI has more than 90 licensed affiliates in 54 countries. It has offices in Lansing, Michigan, Orlando, Florida and India, and holds exclusive Hospitality Education Program (HEP) license agreements in 45 countries throughout Europe, Asia, the Middle East, Africa, and Latin America.

Most certifications, especially Certified Hotel Administrators (CHAs), can earn undergraduate or graduate credit for their certification when they enroll in certain American Public University programs of study. The American Council on Education (ACE) determined the CHA certification is worth six semester credits at an upper-division baccalaureate degree level and three semester credits at a graduate degree level.
