= Benedict International Education Group =

Bénédict-School
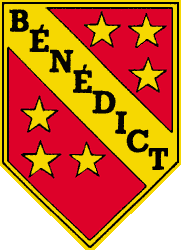
- Switzerland

Information
- Type: Foundation Business school Language school
- Motto: Learn Today, Apply Tomorrow
- Established: 1928
- Founder: Dr. Gaston Bénédict
- Specialist: Languages
- President: Pierre Bénédict
- Staff: 15000 worldwide
- Gender: Mixed
- Age: 11 to 60
- Enrolment: 50000 worldwide
- Website: https://benedict-international.ch/en/

Benedict International Education Group (Bénédict) is a Swiss group with 80 schools worldwide.

== History ==
Benedict International Education Group was formed in 1928 by Dr. Gaston Bénédict, a linguist and former Professor at the University of Southern California. He established his first school in Lausanne, Switzerland. His father, Simon Bénédict (1873–1933), a French-Alsacian, opened at the end of the nineteenth century a school in Egypt. Later, Simon Bénédict would open a series of schools in Switzerland. Gaston took over in 1928 and launched the Benedict school movement in Lausanne, providing business and language tuition. Under his son, Jean Bénédict (1928-2025), the schools further flourished internationally.
