= American Culinary Federation =

Professional chefs' organization in North America

The American Culinary Federation (ACF) is a professional chef's organization established in 1929 in New York City. It was formed as a merge of three chefs' associations in New York City, the Société Culinaire Philanthropique, the Vatel Club and the Chefs de Cuisine Association of America.

ACF, now based in Jacksonville, Florida, comprises more than 14,000 members in over 170 chapters in the United States. An ACF-led initiative resulted in the upgrade of the definition of chef from domestic to professional in 1976. The ACF is a member of the World Association of Chefs Societies.

== Education ==
Through the American Culinary Federation Educational Foundation (ACFEF), ACF offers accreditation of secondary and post-secondary culinary education programs. ACF-accredited culinary programs are offered in the United States, Guam, Puerto Rico, Bermuda, Philippines, Bulgaria, Italy, Peru, Russia, and Switzerland.

ACF also oversees apprenticeship programs that combine on-the-job training and classroom instruction for future chefs. ACF assists establishments in setting up their own apprenticeship programs for students and has created a set of national apprenticeship guidelines and standards that are registered with the U.S. Department of Labor. In 2012, the ACF apprenticeship program received the 21st Century Registered Trailblazers and Innovators Award by the U.S. Department of Labor for its partnership with the U.S. Army.

== Certification ==
ACF offers 13 professional certifications for chefs and culinary educators. Certification levels are based on a chef's educational and work experience. Culinary students may earn a basic level of certification through an ACF-accredited educational program or apprenticeship. Higher levels of certification are achieved by passing written and practical exams and certification is maintained through earning continuing education hours. Continuing education hours are offered at ACF events such as local chapter meetings, regional conferences, the annual National Convention, or through the ACF Online Learning Center.

The highest level of certification offered is Certified Master Chef (CMC).

== Scholarships ==
The American Culinary Federation Education Foundation (ACFEF) provides scholarships for culinary students participating in apprenticeship programs, certificate programs, and post-secondary degree programs. Additionally, professional development grants are awarded on a competitive basis to exemplary working culinary professionals who wish to update their skills through continuing education.

== Works cited ==
- American Culinary Federation, (2015) "ACF Culinary Competitions ...The Ultimate Challenge" Retrieved on April 6, 2007
- American Culinary Federation, (2015) "American Culinary Chef & Child Foundation" Retrieved on May 27, 2015
- American Culinary Federation, (2015) "Office of the President" Retrieved on May 27, 2015
- Leonard, Edward G., American Culinary Federation’s Guide to Culinary Competitions. New York: Wiley, 2005
- Michael Baskette and Brad Barnes., The American Culinary Federation's Guide to Culinary Certification. New York: Wiley, 2005
