= SHL Schweizerische Hotelfachschule Luzern =

Coordinates: 47°03′22″N 8°19′11″E

Founded in 1909, SHL Schweizerische Hotelfachschule Luzern is a Swiss hospitality management institute in Lucerne, Switzerland.

SHL is one of the original Swiss hotel management schools and offers one of the two Bachelor of Science in Hospitality Management degrees in Switzerland accredited by the Swiss federal government and in compliance with the Bologna Declaration.

== History ==
The founding organisation of SHL Schweizerische Hotelfachschule Luzern, Union Helvetia – today Hotel & Gastro Union - was founded 1886 with a strong focus on the professional development of hotel employees. With the boom of hotel construction in Switzerland, which was specifically aimed at tourists (between 1890 and 1914), the demand for talented and trained hotel employees also increased. To meet this demand, Union Helvetia opened the SHL Schweizerische Hotelfachschule Luzern in 1909.

== Education ==
SHL offers two main programmes:

- The Bachelor of Science in Business Administration with major in Hospitality Management (4-year full-time programme, taught in English), which is offered in cooperation with the HSLU Lucerne University of Applied Sciences and Arts, combines and intermeshes hotel management and business administration.
- Dipl. Hoteliere-Gastronomin / Hotelier-Gastronom HF, consisting of four practice-oriented semesters, two five-month industry internships and a six-month employment in a management position.

== See also ==
- List of Hospitality Management Schools in Switzerland
