= HIM Business School =

Private hotel school in Switzerland

Coordinates: 46.4327°N 6.9111°E

- Motto: Be World Ready
- Type: Private
- Established: 1985
- Parent institution: Swiss Education Group
- Accreditation: Northwood University, ACBSP, EduQua Swiss quality label for further education institutions, Federation of Swiss Private Schools, Swisstainable, Ministry of Higher Education accreditations (Kingdom of Saudi Arabia, Jordan)
- Affiliations: EFMD
- Dean: Claire Jollain
- Students: 1324
- Location: Avenue des Alpes 15, 1820 Montreux, Switzerland, Montreux, Switzerland
- Campus: Montreux
- Colors: Dark Blue, Light Blue, White, Electric Blue, Red and Black
- Website: www.him-business-school.com/en/

HIM Business School (formerly Hotel Institute Montreux) is a private business school located in Montreux, in the French-speaking region of Switzerland. Established in 1985, the school is part of Swiss Education Group. The school offers a 3-years Bachelor of Business Administration (BBA) degree, with various majors allowing students to tailor their degree to a specific focus in global industries. The campus spans 4 central Montreux buildings—Hotel Europe, Leman Residence, Hotel Miramonte, and the Freddie Mercury hotel.

== History ==
Originally founded in 1985 as École Hôtelière de Montreux, the institution began as a traditional hospitality management school. In 2002, it was acquired by the Swiss Education Group (SEG), a prominent network of hospitality, culinary and business schools in Switzerland. In 2018, SEG became part of Summer Capital, a Hong Kong-based investment management firm, marking a new chapter in the school's international development and growth.

In recent years, the school transitioned from a hospitality-focused curriculum to a broader business education model, reflecting a shift in academic orientation and global market demands. As part of this evolution, it was rebranded as HIM Business School.

== Programs ==
HIM Business School offers bachelor & master degrees:

- a Bachelor of Business Administration degree in partnership with Northwood University (USA). The program offers a choice of 4 majors:
  - Hospitality
  - Finance
  - Marketing
  - Management
- a Master in Applied AI in Customer Experience, with global immersion as the program is taught between Switzerland and Macao, one of Asia’s fastest-moving innovation regions

== Educational Approach ==
There are 2 differentiating elements in the educational approach of HIM compared to other business schools:

The business curriculum at HIM Business School includes elements traditionally associated with Swiss hospitality education, such as service orientation, intercultural communication, and soft skills. This approach emphasizes:

- Soft skills development, including cultural awareness, empathy, active listening and communication
- Customer-centric business perspectives drawn from hospitality traditions and service-based training

These elements enhance students’ professional adaptability and interpersonal competencies across various sectors.

=== Vocational Training ===
The other differentiating factor is the inclusion of internships as a requirement for program completion. The Swiss education system follows a dual education model that combines practical and vocational education with academics and theory, and HIM Business School follows the same structure. To support students in this aspect of their studies, the school offers:

- Personalized career coaching
- Masterclasses and events with participating partners offering insights and connections into the industry
- Access to international recruitment fairs for professional networking and job placement

The inclusion of practical education prepares students for the professional world and speeds up their process of finding a job upon graduation.

== Industry Collaboration ==
HIM has formed strategic partnerships with key corporations that support and contribute to the curriculum in line with its mission to bridge academia and the professional world and be always industry-relevant.

At the date of this most recent update, the partners endorsing and contributing to the curriculum are:

- Michael Page International: supporting of the Talent Management Specialization
- Banque Privée Edmond de Rothschild: supporting the Financial Analysis and Wealth Management specialization
- Swissquote: supporting the Financial Analysis and Wealth Management specialization
- Swiss Sustainable Finance: endorsing the Financial Analysis and Wealth Management specialization
- Tourbillon Boutique: endorsing the Luxury Brand Management specialization
- AccorInvest Group: supporting the Hospitality Management pathway

Through this collaboration, students benefit from:

- Expert-led workshops
- Current industry-relevant curriculum
- Real industry projects and case studies

== Rankings ==
Quacquarelli Symonds / QS World University Rankings -

Hospitality and Leisure category
	2020	2021	2022	2023	2024	2025	2026
Position	24	6	7	7	6	7	8

In the 2025 ranking of the British higher education consultant Quacquarelli Symonds (QS World University Rankings), the institute was designated as number six for employer reputation and academic reputation in the world in its subject category.

== See also ==
- Swiss Hotel Management School
- César Ritz Colleges
- Culinary Arts Academy Switzerland
- Swiss Education Group
- List of Hospitality Management Schools in Switzerland
