= Business and Hotel Management School, Lucerne =

School for business and hotel management

BHMS Business & Hotel Management School
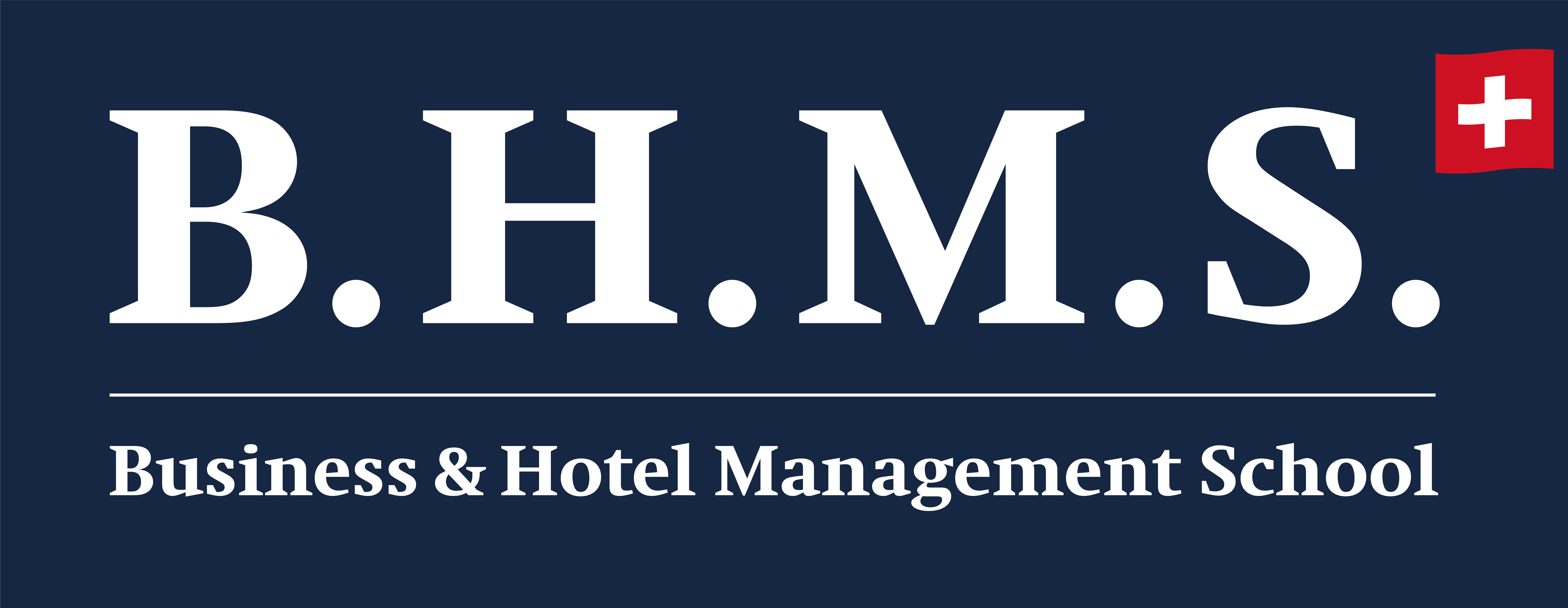
- Motto: Preparing Global Leaders
- Type: Private institution of higher education
- Established: 1998
- Affiliations: Benedict Education Group
- President: H. Meister
- Principal: Ronan Fitzgerald
- Dean: Andrea Stropkova
- Faculty: 100
- Students: 700 per year
- Location: Lucerne, Zurich, Switzerland
- Campus: Urban
- Colours: Blue, red, and gold
- Website: www.bhms.ch

BHMS Business & Hotel Management School is a private business & hospitality school in the cities of Lucerne and Zurich, Switzerland established in 1998.

Founded as a branch of the Bénédict Schools, this education group has 8 campuses in Switzerland (in St. Gallen, Zurich, Lucerne and Bern) and over 15,000 students and professionals studying at its premises every year.

BHMS provides undergraduate and postgraduate programmes in the fields of global business, hospitality management, and culinary arts.

== History ==
- 1998 - BHMS was founded as a branch of Bénédict School, in Switzerland. Opening of BHMS Baselstrasse Campus.
- 2003 - Recognition of awards from Brighton University.
- 2007 - Collaborative agreement developed with Robert Gordon University.
- 2008 - First validation event to offer a Robert Gordon University programme at BHMS. Introduction of the first bachelor's degree in Hotel & Hospitality Management. Opening of BHMS Lakefront Centre Campus. BHMS receives the full accreditation by the ACFF (American Culinary Federation Foundation).
- 2009-2019 2-year MBA programme offered in partnership with CityU of Seattle in 2 specialisation areas: Hospitality Management and Global Management.
- 2010 - Appointment of Heather Robinson as Academic Dean.
- 2011/2012 - Opening of BHMS St. Karli Quai Campus. Opening of BHMS Sentipark Campus.
- 2015 - Inauguration of a new BHMS Culinary Lab in Lucerne. Introduction of the new MSc in International Hospitality Business Management (RGU).
- 2015 - Validation of the Graduate Certificate in International Hospitality Business Management.
- 2016 - Validation of the Bachelor of Arts in Culinary Arts and first cohort of culinary students.
- 2016 - Introduction of the summer/winter camps. Introduction of the HF- Dipl. Hotelier Restaurateur program in German. Opening of the BHMS City Campus' in Lucerne.
- 2018 - Appointment of BHMS Director Beat Wicki.
- 2018 - Introduction of the new BHMS MBA Degrees in 3 specializations.
- 2018 - Introduction of the new MSc in Global Business Management (RGU).
- 2019-2024 - 1-year MBA programme offered in partnership with York St John University in 3 specialisation areas: International Hospitality Management, Innovation and Entrepreneurship, and Global Marketing.
- 2021 - Appointment of Michael G. Wagenthaler as BHMS Director.
- 2022 - Inauguration of new Lakeside Campus (former Union Hotel).
- 2023 - Introduction of the Pastry, Chocolate, and Bakery track in the culinary programmes.
- 2024 - Appointment of Mark Urech as Academic Dean.
- 2024 - Appointment of Judith Schädler Wurster and Sarah Loiseau as Associate Deans.
- 2024 - Addition of new specialisations to the MBA programme: Digital Transformation in Tourism Management, Luxury Brand Management, AI and Digital Innovation, Innovative Start-Up Business Strategies, Cybersecurity and Big Data Management, Global Marketing and Sales
- 2025 - Opening of BHMS campus in Zurich, summer 2025.
- 2025 - Appointment of Ronan Fitzgerald as BHMS Director.
- 2025 - Appointment of Andrea Stropkova as Academic Dean, Lucerne.
- 2025 - Appointment of Heather Robinson as Principal, BHMS Zurich.

== Accreditation & memberships ==
- Member of EURHODIP - The Leading Hotel Schools in Europe;
- Member of the International Council on Hotel, Restaurant and Institutional Education (I-CHRIE);
- Member of the American Hotel & Lodging Association;
- Its culinary programme is accredited by the Accrediting Commission of the American Culinary Federation Foundation.

== Rankings ==
In 2023, B.H.M.S. was rated a Five-Star Institute by QS World University Rankings.

In 2026, B.H.M.S. ranked 12th globally in the QS World University Rankings by Subject (Hospitality & Leisure Management), an improvement of 20 positions compared to the previous year, and holds a five-star rating from QS Stars.

== Campuses ==
BHMS has 4 campuses located in the center of Lucerne city within a 5–15 minute walking distance from each other.

== See also ==
- List of Hospitality Management Schools in Switzerland
