= World Association of Chefs' Societies =

The World Association of Chefs' Societies (Worldchefs) is a global network of chefs associations first founded in October 1928 at the Sorbonne in Paris. At that first Worldchefs Congress there were 65 delegates from 17 countries, representing 36 national and international associations, and the venerable August Escoffier was named the first Honorary President of Worldchefs. Today, this global body has 98 official chefs associations as members. The biennial congress is a hallmark tradition of Worldchefs and has been organized in over 40 cities across the world throughout its 98-year history, Worldchefs is managed by an elected presidential body consisting of the Worldchefs president, vice president, treasurer, secretary general and ambassador honorary president, as well as a board of continental directors that look after the regions of Asia, Europe, Middle East & Africa, the Pacific-Rim and the Americas. A separate committee manages all culinary competition-related affairs.

== History ==
Notable events
Date	Details
End of 19th Century	Contact between various chef associations established
1919	International labour office opens in Geneva, Switzerland
1920	Swiss cook federation introduces the idea of an international chef association in May
1928	Worldchefs was established in Sorbonne, Paris. August Escoffier appointed as the first honorary president
1930	Congress held in Paris, France
1936	Congress held in Nice, France
1939-1945	Contact between WACS members suspended due to Second World War
1949	SKV secretary W. Salzmann and the Swiss cook federation reinstate WACS
1951	Congress held in Frankfurt, Germany. Switzerland assumes WACS presidency
1954	Congress held in Berne, Switzerland
1956	Congress held in Frankfurt, Germany. Austria assumes WACS presidency
1958	Congress held in Brussels, Belgium
1960	Congress held in Vienna, Austria. Germany assumes WACS presidency
1962	Congress held in Stockholm, Sweden
1964	Congress held in Frankfurt, Germany. Switzerland assumes Worldchefs presidency
1966	Congress held in Tel Aviv, Israel
1968	WACS celebrates its 40th anniversary
1968	Congress held in Geneva, Switzerland. Austria assumes WACS presidency
1970	Congress held in Budapest, Hungary
1972	Congress held in Frankfurt, Germany. German cook federation takes over presidency
1974	Congress held in Banff, Canada. Landmark meeting between members from different continents. Emile Perrin is selected to honorary president
1976	Congress held in Frankfurt, Germany. France assumes WACS presidency
1978	Congress held in Paris, France
1980	Congress held in Rome, Italy. Canada assumes WACS presidency
1982	Congress held in Vienna, Austria and Budapest, Hungary
1984	Congress held in Orlando, USA. Canada retains WACS presidency
1986	Congress held in Ljubljana, Slovenia
1988	WACS celebrates its 60th anniversary
1988	Congress held in Johannesburg, South Africa. Germany assumes WACS presidency
1990	Congress held in Singapore
1992	Congress held in Frankfurt, Germany. USA assumes WACS presidency
1994	Congress held in Stavanger, Norway
1996	Congress held in Jerusalem, Israel. South Africa assumes WACS presidency
1998	WACS celebrates its 70th anniversary
1998	Congress held in Melbourne, Australia
2000	Congress in Maastricht, Netherlands. Germany assumes WACS presidency
2002	Congress held in Kyoto, Japan
2004	Congress held in Dublin, Ireland. USA assumes WACS presidency
2006	Congress held in Auckland, New Zealand
2008	Congress held in Dubai, UAE. Iceland assumes WACS presidency
2010	Congress held in Santiago, Chile
2012	Congress held in Daejeon, South Korea
2014	Congress held in Stavanger, Norway
2016	Congress held in Thessaloniki, Greece
2017	Historical Committee Established by WACS President Thomas Gugler
2018	Congress held in Kuala Lumpur, Malaysia
2020	Congress held in St. Petersburg, Russia (Canceled)
2022	Congress held in Abu Dhabi, UAE
2024	Congress held in Singapore
2024	New WACS President elected: Mr Andy Cuthbert
2026	Congress held in Wales, UK

== See also ==
- Culinary Arts
- Bocuse d'Or
- International Exhibition of Culinary Art
