= César Ritz Colleges =

Hospitality college in Switzerland

Coordinates: 46.3867°N 6.850°E

César Ritz Colleges Switzerland
- César Ritz Colleges Switzerland
- Motto: Learn to Lead, Lead to Succeed
- Type: Private
- Established: 1982; 44 years ago
- Founder: Dr. Wolfgang D. Petri
- Parent institution: Swiss Education Group
- Accreditation: Swiss Accreditation Council, THE-ICE, EduQua Swiss quality label for further education institutions, Green Globe, UN Tourism TedQual
- Affiliations: Washington State University (USA), AACSB, EuroCHRIE, Federation of Swiss Private Schools, COBIS Council of British International Schools, Council of International Schools
- Dean: Dr Antonina Santalova
- Location: English-Gruss-Strasse 43, Brig, Valais, 3902, Switzerland
- Campus: Brig
- Colors: Honey orange, Ruby Red, Clay Grey, Soft White, JetBlack
- Website: www.cesarritzcolleges.edu/en/

César Ritz Colleges Switzerland is an educational institution located in Brig, Switzerland. named in honour of César Ritz. The college specializes in entrepreneurship and business management education with emphasis on the hospitality sector. The school offers bachelor's and master's degree programs.

In the 2025 QS World University Rankings, César Ritz Colleges Switzerland was ranked in the top five globally among hospitality and leisure management schools.

== History ==
In 1982, Dr. Wolfgang D. Petri established the first college, Schulhotel Alpina, in Brig as part of the Hotelconsult Management Company. A year later, a second institute, Schulhotel Zillwald, was opened in Lax, Valais. In 1985, the school introduced Switzerland’s first Bachelor of Arts program in Hotel Management in partnership with Washington State University (USA).

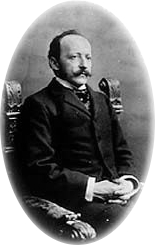
César Ritz (1897)

César Ritz, the school's namesake, was a renowned hotelier, best known for his work at the Hôtel Ritz in Paris and the Ritz and Carlton Hotels in London. In 1986, Monique Ritz, Ritz’s daughter-in-law, along with the César Ritz Foundation, granted the institution the right to rename itself in his honour. Consequently, the Institut Hôtelier César Ritz was established in Le Bouveret, and in 1997, the Brig campus was renamed University Centre César Ritz.

The Culinary Arts Academy Switzerland, originally founded in Lucerne in 1998, became part of César Ritz Colleges Switzerland in 2011, relocating to the former Hotel Union building in Lucerne.

In 2005, the school underwent ownership changes when Martin Kisseleff and Bernhard Schwestermann acquired the institution, with the former owner, Dr. W. D. Petri, being named Honorary President.

In 2011, the César Ritz Colleges Group was acquired by Invision Private Equity AG.

In 2018, the Swiss Education Group, to which César Ritz Colleges Switzerland belongs, was acquired by the Hong Kong-based investment management company Summer Capital.

=== Milestones ===
- 1982: The Hotelconsult Management Company was established, and the first college, Schulhotel Alpina, was opened in Brig, Valais, by Dr. Wolfgang D. Petri.
- 1983: The second institute, Schulhotel Zillwald, was opened in Lax, Valais.
- 1985: Transfer agreements were signed with several state universities in the United States, Europe, and Australia. The first Bachelor of Arts program in hotel management in Switzerland was launched in collaboration with Washington State University (WSU).
- 1986: The César Ritz Foundation in the Valais Region, along with Monique Ritz, daughter-in-law of César Ritz, granted the institution the right to use the name César Ritz for its colleges. The Institut Hôtelier César Ritz was opened in Le Bouveret.
- 1991: The first postgraduate diploma program in hotel management in Switzerland was introduced.
- 1992: First US bachelor's degree in hotel management in Switzerland in collaboration with the University of Massachusetts Amherst. The ICHA Foundation was established, and the International College of Hospitality Administration was opened in Brig. Additionally, the International College of Hospitality Management César Ritz was opened in Washington, Connecticut, USA.
- 1996: The International College of Management in Sydney (ICMS), Australia, was established, offering the César Ritz program.
- 1997: The U.S. bachelor's degree was awarded in partnership with Washington State University. The Brig campus was renamed "University Centre César Ritz" following approval by Swiss Government authorities to use the name "University".
- 2000: The first Master of Science in International Hospitality Management program in Switzerland was launched at University Centre César Ritz in collaboration with Manchester Metropolitan University, UK.
- 2002: César Ritz Colleges Switzerland enrolled its 10,000^{th} student.
- 2003:
  - The Canton of Valais, Switzerland, recognized the Bachelor of International Business Degree and the Master of Business Administration in Hotel and Tourism Management offered at University Centre César Ritz.
  - The International College of Hospitality Management César Ritz opened in Suffield, Connecticut, USA, becoming the first and only Swiss hotel school in the United States.
- 2005: César Ritz Colleges became the first Swiss hotel management school to receive accreditation from EduQua, the accrediting body of the World Tourism Organization. A management buy-out was arranged by Martin Kisseleff and Bernhard Schwestermann, with Dr. Wolfgang . D. Petri being named Honorary President.
- 2006:
  - The first "double degree" agreement was signed with the University La Sabana, Bogotá, Colombia.
  - The Leadership Program was introduced at the undergraduate level.
- 2007: Partner school agreements were established in New Zealand, India, the United Arab Emirates, Iceland, and Peru.
- 2008: The "Themis & Xenius" student accommodation, comprising 225 single rooms, was opened in Brig.
- 2010: The annual European conference of the United Nations World Tourism Organization was hosted at the University Centre César Ritz in Brig.
- 2011: Invision Private Equity AG acquired the César Ritz Colleges Group, which joined the network of the Swiss Education Group.
- 2012: DCT joined César Ritz Colleges, and the Lucerne Campus was opened in the renovated Hotel Union building. César Ritz Colleges introduced iPads as an interactive learning tool for all students.
- 2013: The University of Derby (UK) was announced as the academic partner for all master's degree programs.
- 2021: The Le Bouveret campus of César Ritz Colleges Switzerland received Green Globe certification.
- 2023: César Ritz Colleges Switzerland was federally accredited by the Swiss Accreditation Council.
- 2025:
  - César Ritz Colleges consolidated all classes and operations to its campus in Brig, granting full use of the Le Bouveret campus to Culinary Arts Academy Switzerland.
  - The Macao University of Tourism (UTM) and the Swiss Education Group (SEG) held a MOU signing ceremony on Cooperation in the Guangdong-Macao In-Depth Cooperation Zone in Hengqin, establishing the Macao University of Tourism - César Ritz Colleges Switzerland Centre for Innovative Talent Development (abbreviated as “UTM-CRCS Centre for Innovative Talent Development”)

== Education ==
César Ritz Colleges Switzerland offers a four-year BSc degree in Hotel and Tourism Management and a 2-year MSc degree in Leadership.

The curriculum integrates principles of American entrepreneurship with Swiss hospitality practices. Experiential learning is a significant aspect of the programs, with students engaging in practical activities alongside traditional lectures.

César Ritz Colleges Switzerland has partnerships with various industry entities, including Ritz Paris, Evian Resort, Comité Champagne and Switzerland Tourism.

== Campuses ==
César Ritz Colleges Switzerland is located in Brig, Switzerland.

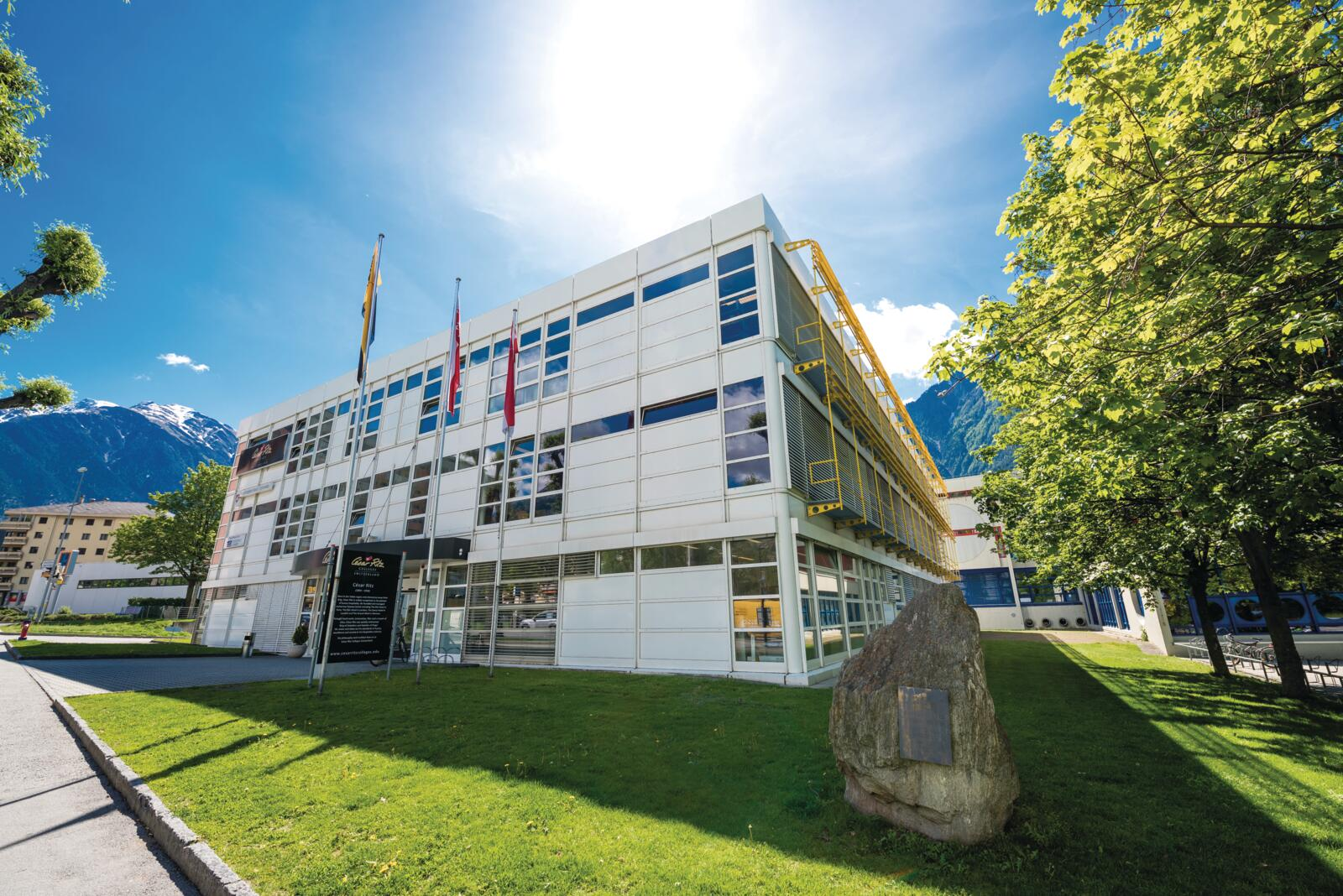
Brig campus

=== Brig campus ===
Situated in Brig-Glis, the largest German-speaking town in the canton of Valais, the Brig campus is split between 2 buildings in the town center. Brig also is home to the training restaurant Alpina, which is open to the public and run by final year students from César Ritz Colleges and Culinary Arts Academy Switzerland.

== Rankings ==
Quacquarelli Symonds / QS World University Rankings -

Hospitality and Leisure category
	2020	2021	2022	2023	2024	2025	2026
Position	13	7	6	6	3	5	5

== See also ==
- Swiss Hotel Management School
- HIM Business School
- Culinary Arts Academy Switzerland
- Swiss Education Group
- List of Hospitality Management Schools in Switzerland
