= Accreditation Council for Business Schools and Programs =

Educational accreditation organization

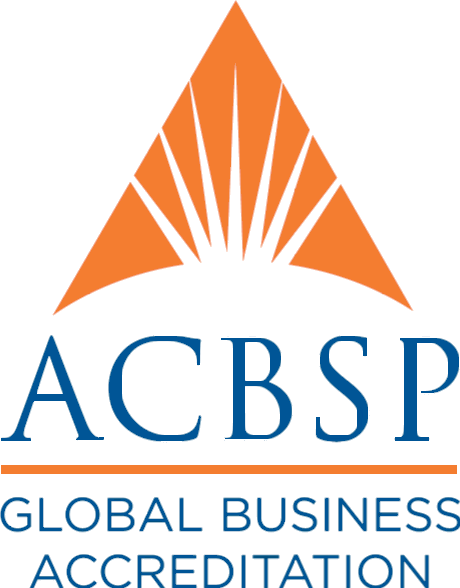
- Abbreviation: ACBSP
- Formation: 1989; 37 years ago
- Type: Non-governmental organization (NGO)
- Legal status: Active
- Purpose: Educational accreditation
- Location: Kansas City, United States
- Region served: United States
- Chairman: Dewayne Thompson
- Website: acbsp.org
- Formerly called: Association of Collegiate Business Schools and Programs

The Accreditation Council for Business Schools and Programs (ACBSP) is a United States–based organization offering educational accreditation services to business programs focused on teaching and learning.

Based in Overland Park, Kansas (a suburb of Kansas City), the ACBSP was created to fulfill a need for specialized accreditation by colleges and universities with business schools and programs.

== History ==
The ACBSP was founded in 1989 as the Association of Collegiate Business Schools and Programs to accredit business schools with an emphasis on teaching and learning. At the time, only 260 out of 2,400 schools of business had specialized professional accreditation, all from the Association to Advance Collegiate Schools of Business (AACSB). Most or all of the AACSB-accredited schools had an emphasis on research, while most other schools had an emphasis on teaching. On April 28, 1988, 150 of the non-accredited schools met in Kansas City, Missouri, to consider alternatives to AACSB accreditation for teaching-oriented schools.

On May 12, 1989, a study group completed a feasibility study and submitted recommendations for standards for accreditation by the ACBSP. In August 1992, the ACBSP was recognized by the U.S. Department of Education as a specialized accreditation agency for business education. In June 1994, a U.S. Department of Education Advisory Committee recommended withdrawal of recognition for the ACBSP due to a determination that ACBSP accreditation would not be a "required element" in making an institution eligible to participate in U.S. federal government programs under the Higher Education Act or other authorities. However, at its meeting on January 22, 2001, the Council for Higher Education Accreditation (CHEA) Board of Directors granted recognition to the ACBSP. On September 19, 2011, the CHEA renewed its recognition of the ACBSP for a further 10 years.

In June 2010, the ACBSP changed its name from Association of Collegiate Business Schools and Programs to Accreditation Council for Business Schools and Programs. The ACBSP mostly accredits business schools with traditional campus locations, but also accredits online business programs.

== Membership ==
As of August 2010, the ACBSP reported having over 8,000 individual members and 828 member educational institutions, of which 529 had ACBSP accreditation and 220 had candidacy status. All but 134 member institutions were in the United States. In April 2013, the ACBSP reported 1,171 member campuses, 183 of which were located outside the U.S. Of those campuses, 586 had achieved accreditation and more than 500 were in candidacy for accreditation. Individual members on these campuses exceeded 10,000.

== Affiliations ==
The ACBSP holds membership and/or recognition in the following networks:

- Universidad Argentina de la Empresa – UADE
- Council for Higher Education Accreditation – CHEA
- European Association for Quality Assurance in Higher Education (Affiliate Status) – ENQA
- International Network for Quality Assurance Agencies in Higher Education – INQAAHE
- Association of African Business Schools – AABS
- Principles for Responsible Management Education – PRME
- Consejo Latinoamericano de Escuelas de Administración – CLADEA
- Russian Association of Business Education – RABE
- Association of Indian Management Schools – AIMS
- Global Management Challenge, USA
- Enactus
- Federation of Swiss Private Schools/Swiss Private School Register
- The ACBSP has recognized certification program standards which allow for certifications to be awarded to top ACBSP students who meet the exam and GPA requirements.
- The International Board of Standards (IBS), a U.S.-based certifying body that operates in around 40 countries and owns the Global Academy of Finance and Management, has had an agreement with the ACBSP since 2004 to offer certifications to those who have completed ACBSP-accredited business school courses, standards exams, and programs.

== Honor societies ==
Through an agreement made in January 1992 between Delta Mu Delta and the ACBSP, establishment of Delta Mu Delta chapters is now exclusively at colleges and universities with business programs which are accredited by the ACBSP at the baccalaureate or graduate levels. Delta Mu Delta was founded in 1913 by five professors from Yale University and New York University to recognize students in accredited business schools for their high academic achievement in baccalaureate, master's, and doctoral programs. The ACBSP also recognizes the Kappa Beta Delta business honor society and the Sigma Beta Delta business honor society. Membership in the honor societies is also available to online students who are attending ACBSP-accredited programs.

== Employer recognition ==
In 2006, Intel announced that it would no longer provide tuition reimbursement for employees to attend business schools with accreditation from the ACBSP, which accredited several for-profit universities. Instead, it would reimburse only AACSB-accredited courses. At the same time, the company imposed a similar restriction on reimbursements for engineering programs. The company explained that the policy change was intended to make the program more cost-effective for the company, noting that employees had been receiving reimbursement for programs "that were not of the highest value to the company" or had left Intel after finishing programs that did not advance their careers there.
