= Le Bouveret =

Swiss village

Coordinates: 46.383°N 6.858°E

Le Bouveret (French pronunciation: [lə buvʁɛ]) is a village in the commune of Port-Valais in the Swiss canton of Valais. Situated at the southernmost end of Lake Geneva and close to the French border, Le Bouveret is very much tourism-oriented with several amusement attractions, including the Swiss Vapeur Parc and the waterpark Aquaparc. Le Bouveret is also the seat of Culinary Arts Academy Switzerland, the #1 Culinary and Pastry Arts School in Switzerland.

Aerial view (1968)

== Access ==
- By bus, from the Aigle train station.
- By train, from the Saint-Maurice station.
- From Motorway A9 (Brigue - Lausanne - Vallorbe), exit 16 (Villeneuve) or 17 (Aigle)
- By boat from Lake Geneva.
