= Swiss quality label for further education institutions =

EDUQUA Swiss quality label for further education institutions
- Abbreviation: EduQua
- Legal status: Non-profit organisation
- Purpose: Quality label for adult education
- Location: Zürich
- Region served: CH
- Parent organization: Swiss Federation for Adult Learning
- Website: EduQua

Swiss quality label for further education institutions (eduQua) (in German: Schweizerisches Qualitätszertifikat für Weiterbildungsinstitutionen "eduQua" ) is a Swiss quality label for continuing and adult education. eduQua was founded by the Swiss departments of economy as well as professional education and the Swiss Federation for Adult Learning (SVEB). It is now owned and operated by the Swiss Federation for Adult Learning (SVEB). The eduQua label certifies that an adult education institution follows the minimum prescribed quality standard eduQua:2021 (previously eduQua:2012). EduQua does neither certify nor accredit any institution.

== Certification ==
The eduQua certification is open to all institutions in the field of continuing education and adult education meeting the prescribed basic quality assurance standard. It is intended to promote transparency, comparability, and quality of continuing education offerings.

More than 1,100 schools, institutes and academies in all of Switzerland are eduQua certified.

== Accreditation ==
Neither eduQua, nor its governing body the Swiss Federation for Adult Learning (SVEB), nor the independent certification bodies are accrediting higher education institutions such as universities. Academic accreditation is, by federal law (Art. 21 HEdA), exclusively done by the Swiss Accreditation Council. In this sense, eduQua certification is not a stand-in for higher education accreditation.

== Validity ==
The eduQua certificate is valid for three years. The responsible certification body undertakes annual interim audits, which may - in extreme cases - lead to the early withdrawal of the eduQua certificate. The certificate in that case may be reacquired after three years.
