= Stephen B. Young =

American lawyer

- Born: November 2, 1945. Washington DC.
- Education: Harvard University (BA, JD)
- Occupations: Lawyer, author
- Notable work: Kissinger's Betrayal: How America Lost the Vietnam War
- Spouse: Hoa Pham Young

Stephen B. Young is an American lawyer and author. He served with the Civil Operations and Rural Development Support program in South Vietnam from 1967 to 1971, and was later involved in efforts to resettle Vietnamese, Laotian, and Cambodian refugees following the fall of Saigon in 1975. Young co-founded the Journal of Law and Religion in 1983 while serving as dean of the Hamline University School of Law, and in 1995 sought the Republican nomination for the United States Senate seat from Minnesota. He has served as Global Executive Director of the Caux Round Table for Moral Capitalism since 2000. Young is the author of Kissinger's Betrayal: How America Lost the Vietnam War (2024), and has been identified as one of the founders of the modern corporate social responsibility movement.

== Early life ==
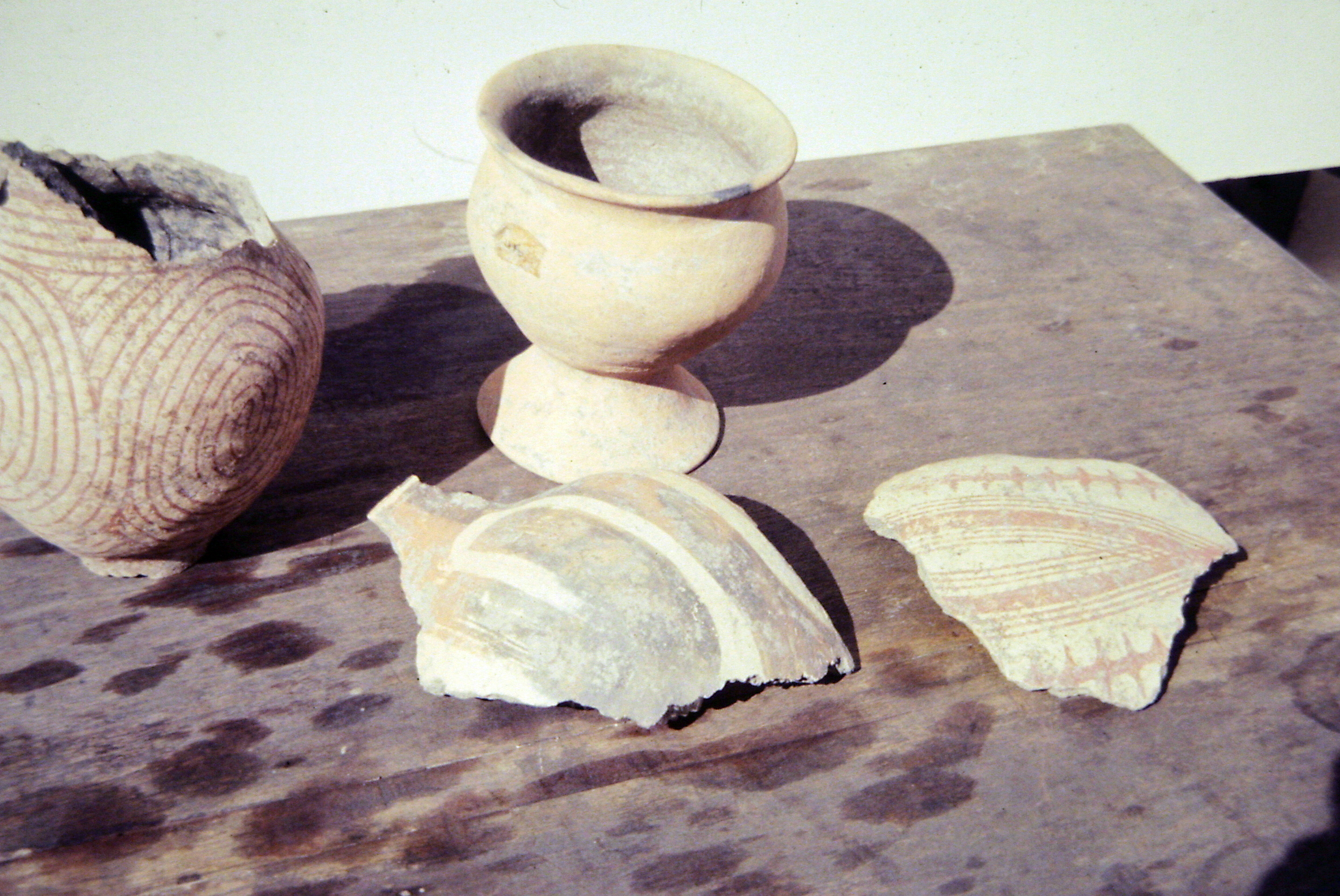
Pottery sherds discovered at Ban Chiang, Thailand, by Stephen B. Young in 1966

Stephen B. Young is the son of Kenneth Todd Young, a United States State Department official who served as Ambassador to Thailand during the Vietnam War era. While a sociology student, Young came across an ancient shard near Ban Chiang village in Udon Thani Province in 1966, leading him to uncover what was later recognized as a significant archaeological site. The site's findings were later assessed as contemporaneous with or predating Bronze Age developments in the Middle East. Ban Chiang was designated a UNESCO World Heritage Site in 1992. The discovery was also described in a 1980 Reader's Digest feature on the origins of the Ban Chiang culture.

The year before, in 1965, Young had conducted a study of the political structure of the Tzotzil community of Zinacantán in Chiapas, Mexico, as part of a Harvard research project. Anthropologist Evon Vogt credited Young's fieldwork in his 1969 book on the community.

== Career ==
=== Vietnam War service ===
Young served with the Civil Operations and Rural Development Support (CORDS) program in South Vietnam from 1967 to 1971. According to William Colby, who later served as Director of Central Intelligence and who arranged Young's transfer to Saigon headquarters, Young was known during his district-level service for his fluency in Vietnamese and his close engagement with village communities. Young's recollections of his work in Vietnamese village during this period were included in journalist Al Santoli's oral history collection To Bear Any Burden (1985).

Young's assistance was later acknowledged by President Richard Nixon in Nixon's 1985 book No More Vietnams, in which Nixon thanks a number of individuals, including Young, for research assistance and counsel. Young was also interviewed by the BBC Vietnamese Service regarding his recollections of Saigon during the war.

=== Journal of Law and Religion ===
While dean at Hamline, Young co-founded the Journal of Law and Religion in 1983. According to Thomas Porter, a founding board member of the journal's sponsoring organization, Young initiated conversations with Harvard Law School professor Harold Berman in 1981 and arranged Berman's visit to Hamline, leading to a formal collaboration between Hamline and the Council on Religion and Law that produced the journal.

=== Caux Round Table ===
Young has served as Global Executive Director of the Caux Round Table for Moral Capitalism since 2000.

Young serves as editor of and contributor to Pegasus, the Caux Round Table's monthly newsletter on the ethics of capitalism and public governance.

=== Fondazione Centesimus Annus Pro Pontifice ===
Young has served on the Advisory Council of the Fondazione Centesimus Annus Pro Pontifice, a lay foundation established to promote Catholic social teaching in business and finance.

== Civic service ==
=== Refugee resettlement ===
Following the fall of South Vietnam in April 1975, Young became involved in efforts to resettle refugees fleeing the communist takeover of Vietnam, Laos, and Cambodia. He was a member of the Citizens Commission for Indochina Refugees chaired by Leo Cherne of the International Rescue Committee. Young later wrote about his experience with the resettlement effort in a 1985 op-ed, describing the difficulty of assisting Vietnamese allies as South Vietnam fell.

=== 1996 U.S. Senate campaign ===
In 1995, Young announced his candidacy for the Republican nomination for the United States Senate seat from Minnesota. During the campaign, columnist D.J. Tice wrote that Young "deserves attention for his willingness to discuss tough issues."

=== Impeachment scholarship ===
While a law student, Young co-authored, with E. Mabry Rogers, "Public Office as a Public Trust: A Suggestion That Impeachment for High Crimes and Misdemeanors Implies a Fiduciary Standard," published in the Georgetown Law Journal in 1975, arguing that the constitutional standard for impeachment should be understood as a breach of fiduciary duty. In a 2018 essay for the Federalist Society Review, constitutional scholar Robert G. Natelson cited Rogers and Young's conclusion, writing that he believed it to be "precisely correct," and used it as the foundation for further analysis of the constitutional impeachment standard.

=== Deep ecology litigation ===
Young represented the Associated Contract Loggers in a lawsuit against the U.S. Forest Service, arguing that restrictions on logging on federal land in northern Minnesota, advocated by environmental groups under the banner of "Deep ecology", amounted to an unconstitutional imposition of religious belief rather than a decision grounded in secular or scientific justification. The federal district court rejected this argument.

== Notable works ==
=== Kissinger's Betrayal: How America Lost the Vietnam War (2024) ===
In this book, Young argues that the collapse of South Vietnam in 1975 resulted from concessions made by Henry Kissinger during peace negotiations with North Vietnam, rather than from South Vietnamese military or political weakness. The book was reviewed for H-Diplo by historian Athanasios Antonopoulos, who situated the work within the revisionist school of Vietnam War historiography alongside scholars such as Mark Moyar and Lewis Sorley. The review credited the book's extensive use of declassified records and primary source material, while also noting that it engages in limited fashion with existing historiography and does not fully address counterarguments found in Kissinger's own memoirs.

=== Recognition in corporate social responsibility scholarship ===
In her 2008 book The Difference Makers: How Social and Institutional Entrepreneurs Created the Corporate Responsibility Movement, professor Sandra Waddock identifies Young as one of twenty-three individuals credited with helping found the corporate social responsibility movement. Waddock specifically cites Young's book Moral Capitalism: Reconciling Private Interest with the Public Good (2003), which was also reviewed by Foreword Reviews, whose reviewer called it "a most important book."

=== The Zenith (2012) ===
Young and his wife, Hoa Pham Young, translated Vietnamese novelist Doung Thu Huong's The Zenith into English, published by Viking in 2012. The novel, which imagines the final months of Ho Chi Minh's life, was reviewed by The Boston Globe, which described the translation as "rich and lyrical," and by Kirkus Reviews.

=== Adam Smith and Modern Economics: Reclaiming the Moral High Ground (2026) ===
Young edited Adam Smith and Modern Economics: Reclaiming the Moral High Ground, published by De Gruyter, which examines the relationship between Adam Smith's moral philosophy and his economic theory. The book was discussed on the New Books Network by Alfred Marcus, professor at the University of Minnesota's Carlson School of Management.

=== The Tradition of Human Rights in China and Vietnam (2022) ===
Young co-authored The Tradition of Human Rights in China and Vietnam with Nguyen Ngoc Huy, with an introduction by Jerome Cohen . The book traces the history of Chinese and Vietnamese jurisprudence over roughly 5,000 years, arguing that both legal traditions historically subordinated individual rights to the authority of rulers. Reviewing the book for Asia Times, Duyen Nguyen described it as archiving "the history, culture and the jurisprudent systems of the two prominent countries" and called it "a must-read for anyone interested in understanding the government and politics in China and Vietnam."
