= Iofc =

IOFC or IofC may refer to:

- Initiatives of Change, international goodwill organization, and its related entities.
- International Offshore Financial Centre
