= Clarita von Trott =

German medical doctor and psychotherapist

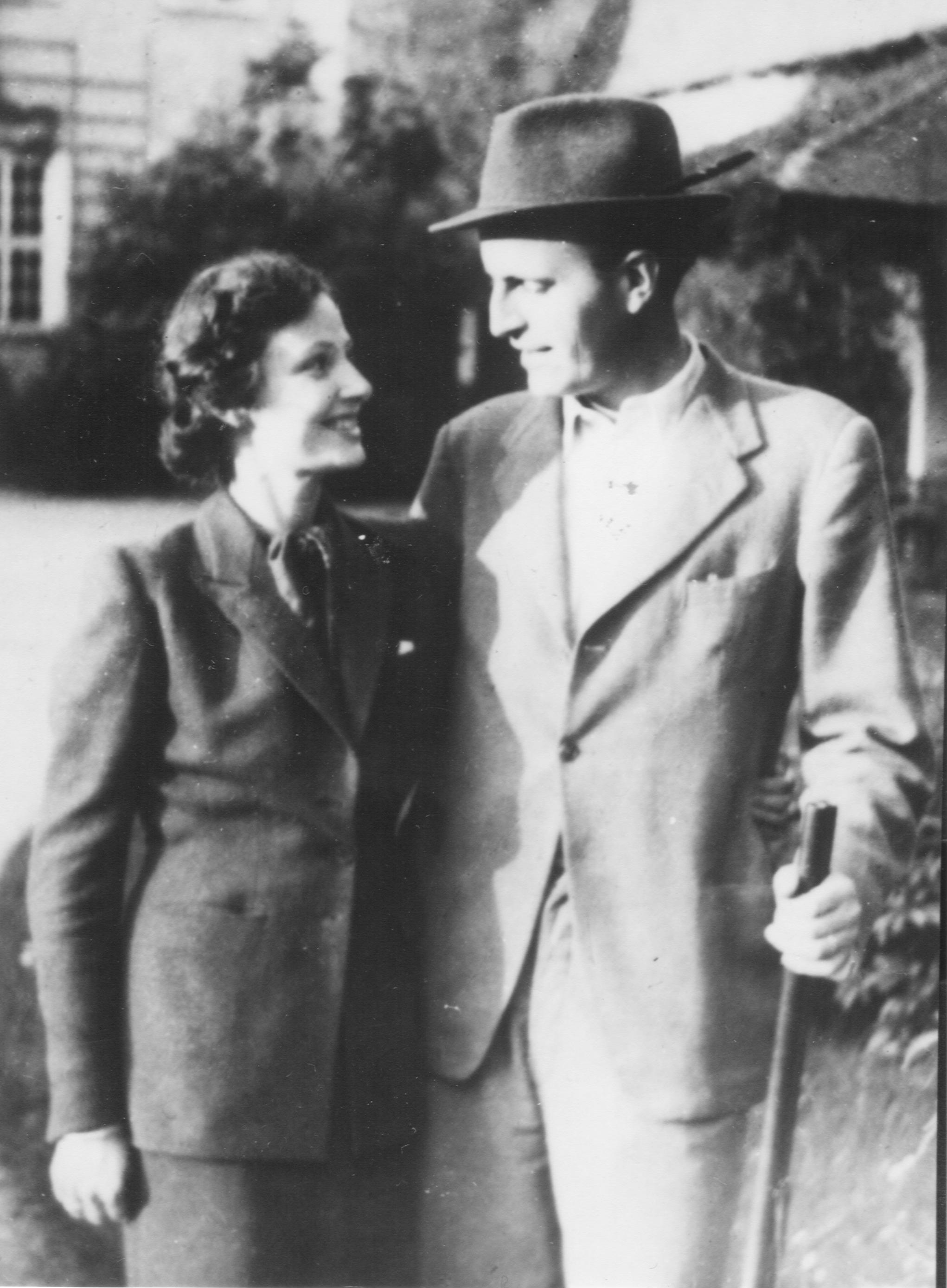
Clarita and Adam von Trott zu Solz in 1944

Clarita von Trott zu Solz, née Tiefenbacher (born on 19 September 1917 in Hamburg; died on 28 March 2013 in Berlin), was a German medical doctor and psychotherapist and the widow of Adam von Trott zu Solz, one of the figureheads of German resistance to Nazism and one of the protagonists of the 20 July Plot, who was executed after the failure of the assassination attempt on Hitler.

== Biography ==
Clarita Tiefenbacher was the daughter of a prominent Hamburg lawyer. She became acquainted with Adam von Trott zu Solz in 1935, happened to travel with him to China and married him in June 1940. Living in Berlin, the young couple had two daughters, Verena, born in 1942, and Clarita, born in 1943. With the increasing bombings, she took refuge with her two daughters at her family in-law's in Imshausen, part of the city of Bebra, in Hesse. There, the Gestapo came to arrest them on 20 July 1944. Under the Sippenhaft law, which put criminal liability of the next of kin to a person who was considered a criminal, she was placed in custody in the Moabit Prison, in Berlin, while her two daughters, aged respectively two years and nine months, were interned under false names in the SS-run Children's Home in Borntal, in Bad Sachsa.

In 1947, Clarita von Trott was one of the first Germans allowed out of Germany after the end of the war. She took part in Caux Conferences to participate in the reconstruction of Europe. She was invited by the Swiss diplomat Philippe Mottu, who had been in contact with the conspirators of the plot against Hitler during the war. Her personal testimony transformed the French Socialist MP and former French Resistance fighter Irène Laure, who became an activist for Franco-German reconciliation.

In 1950, Clarita von Trott began studying medicine and in 1965 wrote her thesis on "the influence of the usual fixers of ultraviolet absorption by serum protein bodies". She then obtained qualifications as a psychotherapist and psychoanalyst and practised in Hamburg and Berlin. At the same time, she led the fight to defend the memory of 20 July Plot participants and the memory and message of her husband. (Until the 1950s, the widows of the conspirators against Hitler received no state pension, their husbands being listed as "traitors".)

She teamed up with Freya von Moltke and Rosemarie Reichwein to initiate the International Meeting of Youth Kreisau/Krzyżowa.

Clarita von Trott kept expressing her message, especially to young people, until the end. She was honorary president of the Adam von Trott Foundation. The Wilhelm Leuschner medal was awarded to her by the State of Hesse in 1998.

== Family ==
On 1 March 1942, Verena, the first daughter of Adam and Clarita von Trott, was born in Berlin. Their second daughter, Clarita, born on 9 November 1943, would become a famous sociologist and marry the fellow sociologist Urs Müller-Plantenberg.

In 1987, she wrote, "My life has been exceptionally rich as the mother to my daughters and their families, and as a therapist, through the friendships and the medical treatment of people in a state of mental distress, but in the centre of my existence, Adam's place, has remained empty". She added in another statement, "My four years of marriage - although they were war years - were in spite of all my most happy years".

== Publications ==
Adam von Trott zu Solz. Eine Lebensbeschreibung. Mit einer Einführung von Peter Steinbach. Durch neue Dokumente ergänzte Ausgabe, Lukas Verlag, Berlin 2009, (ISBN 9783867320634).

== Sources ==
- (de) Dorothee von Meding : Mit dem Mut des Herzens. Die Frauen des 20. Juli. Berlin 1992
- (de) Benigna von Krusenstjern : »daß es Sinn hat zu sterben - gelebt zu haben« Adam von Trott zu Solz 1909–1944. Biographie. Wallstein, Göttingen, 2009. 608 pages. ISBN 9783835305069.
