= Atlantic Institute =

The Atlantic Institute (full name, Atlantic Institute for International Affairs) was an independent, non-governmental institute that promoted economic, political, and cultural relations among NATO alliance members and the international community in general. Based in a mansion at 120, rue de Longchamp in Paris, France, it was founded in 1961 and closed in 1988.

The institute was approved by the NATO Parliamentarians Conference in June 1959 and opened formally on January 1, 1961. Former Belgian Prime Minister Paul van Zeeland was the first Chairman of the institute, while Henry Cabot Lodge became Director-General later that year. Headquarters initially were at the Hôtel de Crillon, site of the 1919 Paris Peace Conference. Funding of $250,000 over five years was supplied by the Ford Foundation, with a further $800,000 given between 1969 and 1973.

In 1978, talks were held to consider a merger between the Atlantic Institute and the Trilateral Commission, a similar private institution promoting American, European, and Japanese cooperation, but no merger proceeded.

On July 12, 1984, the offices of the Institute were bombed by the left-wing guerrilla group Action directe, who described the institute as an "imperialist" organization working for NATO.

== Notable members ==
- George Catlin, draftsman of constitution
- John J. McCloy, Honorary Chairman 1966-1968
- Theodore Achilles, Governor 1969-1973
- Martin J. Hillenbrand, Director General 1977 - 1982
- George Baring, 3rd Earl of Cromer, Governor
- Kasım Gülek, Governor
- Olivier Giscard d'Estaing, Governor
