= Cornelio Sommaruga =

Swiss humanitarian, lawyer, and diplomat (1932–2024)

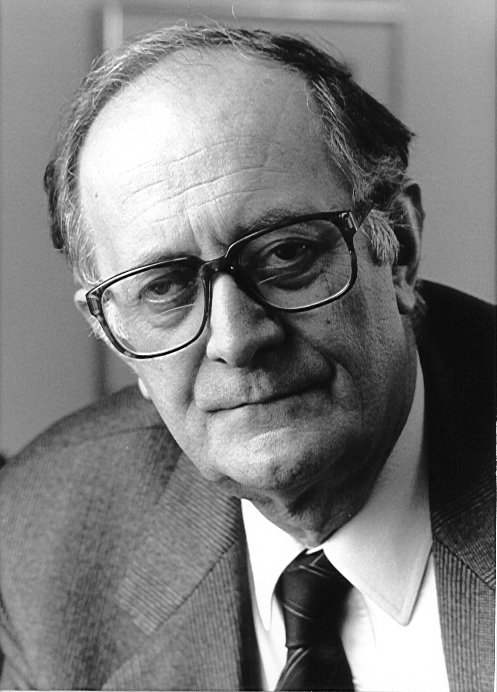
- Born: 29 December 1932; Rome, Kingdom of Italy
- Died: 18 February 2024 (aged 91); Geneva, Switzerland
- Occupations: Humanitarian; lawyer; diplomat

Cornelio Sommaruga (29 December 1932 – 18 February 2024) was a Swiss humanitarian, lawyer and diplomat who is best known for having been President of the International Committee of the Red Cross (ICRC) from 1987 to 1999. He chaired the Geneva International Centre for Humanitarian Demining (GICHD) in Geneva. He was also active on a number of boards, such as the International Union Against Cancer. He was Chair of the Board of Directors of the Foundation For the Future, an organization dedicated to promoting human rights in the Middle East and North Africa, and the honorary President of Initiatives of Change International, a global organization dedicated to "building trust across the world's divides" of culture, nationality, belief, and background.

== Background ==
=== Early years and education ===
Cornelio Sommaruga was born in Rome, Italy, where his father had a professional activity as a commercial lawyer and was stationed during World War II at the Swiss embassy responsible for foreign interests. In fact, he spoke Italian long before he learned German. He was brought up by Catholic parents and remained a devout Christian throughout his life. He was profoundly influenced by his early years in Rome. The period in which his father represented Liberia at the Vatican probably inspired him the most in terms of his long diplomatic and humanitarian career. Despite his connection to Rome, he had close ties with Ticino, his family's canton of origin.

Sommaruga went to grammar and high school in Italy and attended university in Zürich, Switzerland, where he obtained a doctorate in law in 1957. It was only during this period that he learned German, one of the four national languages of Switzerland. He later attended the Graduate Institute of International Studies in Geneva from which he received a diploma in 1961.

=== Professional career ===
Cornelio Sommaruga entered the Swiss diplomatic corps after working two years in the banking sector from 1957 to 1959. He served as a diplomat in The Hague, Rome, Geneva and Bern. From 1968 to 1973, he was the deputy of the Swiss delegation to the European Free Trade Association (EFTA) and the senior representative to the United Nations Conference on Trade and Development, the General Agreement on Tariffs and Trade (GATT) and the United Nations Economic Commission for Europe (UN/ECE), where he further developed his diplomatic and negotiating skills. From 1973 to 1975, he served as the deputy to the Secretary General of EFTA in Geneva. From there, he returned to Bern where he held senior posts at the Office of Foreign Affairs of the Swiss government, among others, as Ambassador, Delegate for Trade Agreements. From 1984 to 1987, he was Undersecretary of State at the Office of Foreign Economic Affairs, a job he left when he was nominated to the International Committee of the Red Cross (ICRC) in 1986.

Cornelio Sommaruga served as President of the ICRC from 1987 to 1999, succeeding Alexandre Hay. During his tenure, the budget and the international activities of the Committee increased considerably. He maintained the neutrality of the ICRC while keeping close ties to all governments of States signatories of the Geneva conventions. One of his initiatives was to propose in 1992 the introduction of an additional symbol representing the Red Cross movement, alongside the Red Cross and Red Crescent, which would be "devoid of any national, religious or political connotation [and] would be available to States and National Societies unable to adopt either of the existing emblems". After 15 years of negotiations this emblem was finally made official as the Red Crystal at the 29th International Conference of the Red Cross and Red Crescent in Geneva on 20 and 21 June 2006."

Sommaruga was the founding President of Initiatives of Change International in April 2002, a voluntary association of independent national legal bodies of Initiatives of Change (IofC). As head of this international movement working to build bridges of trust across the world's divides, he was able to support peace and reconciliation initiatives in Africa's Great Lakes region and in Sierra Leone. He continued to serve on a number of charitable and corporate boards until his death.

=== Controversy ===
Israel refused to cooperate with a team appointed by United Nations Secretary-General Kofi Annan in 2002 to investigate allegations of a massacre in Jenin, partly because Cornelio Sommaruga was personally unacceptable to the Israeli government, due to allegations that he had made a remark comparing the possibility of ICRC official recognition of the Red Star of David emblem (Magen David Adom, see Emblems of the International Red Cross and Red Crescent Movement) to recognition of a "Red Swastika".

=== Personal life and death ===
The grave in May 2025. The inscription on the tombstone reads: "HOMME DE DIALOGUE ET DE PAIX" (Man of Dialogue and Peace)

Cornelio Sommaruga married Ornella Marzorati in 1957 and they had six children. His son is the politician Carlo Sommaruga.

Cornelio Sommaruga died in Geneva on 18 February 2024, at the age of 91. He found his final resting place at the Cimetière des Rois, which is considered the Genevan Panthéon.

== Awards ==
- Personalité suisse la plus populaire auprès des journalistes étrangers, Association de la Presse Etrangère en Suisse, 2003
- Prix de la Fondation Dr. J.E. Brandenberger, 2003
- North-South Prize, Council of Europe, 2001
- Culture, Canton of Basel-land, 1998
- International Society for Human Rights, Swiss section, 1996
- Josef Krainer, Graz, 1996
- Century Foundation, BSI, 1995
- Dr. Jean Mayer Award for Global Citizenship, Tufts University
- Fondazione Cesare e Iside Lavezzari, 1998

+ seven Honorary Doctorates
