= Olivier Giscard d'Estaing =

French politician (1927–2021)

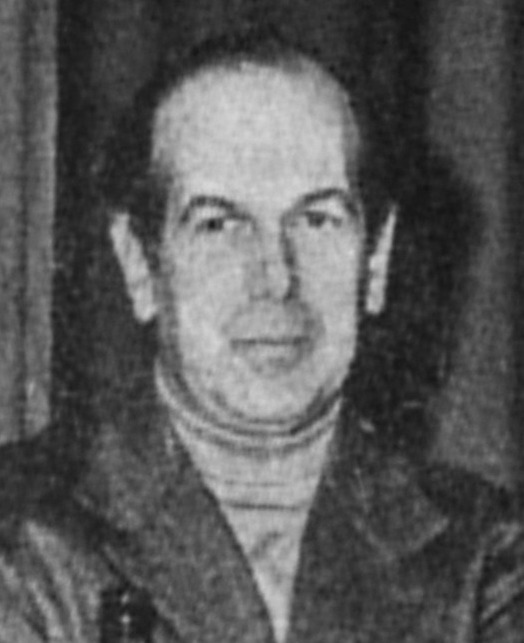
- Giscard d'Estaing in 1975

Member of the National Assembly
- In office 11 July 1968 – 1 April 1973
- Preceded by: Bernard Cornut-Gentille
- Succeeded by: Bernard Cornut-Gentille
- Constituency: 5th constituency of Alpes Maritimes

Personal details
- Born: 30 December 1927 Paris, France
- Died: 13 September 2021 (aged 93) Vierzon, France
- Party: Independent Republicans
- Relations: Valéry Giscard d'Estaing (brother)

Olivier Giscard d'Estaing (30 December 1927 – 13 September 2021) was chairman of the Committee for a World Parliament. The brother of French president Valéry Giscard d'Estaing (1926–2020), he was the founding dean and director general of the INSEAD business school and Governor of the Atlantic Institute.

He served as a member of the French Parliament (from 1968 to 1973), vice-chairman of the European Movement (from 1978 to 1992), and a member of the Conseil Économique et Social de France (from 1994 to 1999). He was also chair of the Business Association for the World Social Summit.

Co-founder of the Caux Round Table, Giscard d'Estaing was the author of six books and widely published in journals such as the Revue Politique Parlementaire and the Revue des Deux Mondes. He frequently lectured on business policy in Europe, the United States, Japan, and the Middle East, and taught business policy at various schools.

For many years a member of the board of several international corporations and an advisor of CEOs of French industrial corporations, Giscard d'Estaing also served as mayor of Estaing (Aveyron).

He was a councillor of the World Future Council.

He graduated from Harvard Business School (HBS) in 1951.
