= Caux, Switzerland =

Village in Vaud, Switzerland

Coordinates: 46°25′58″N 6°56′12″E

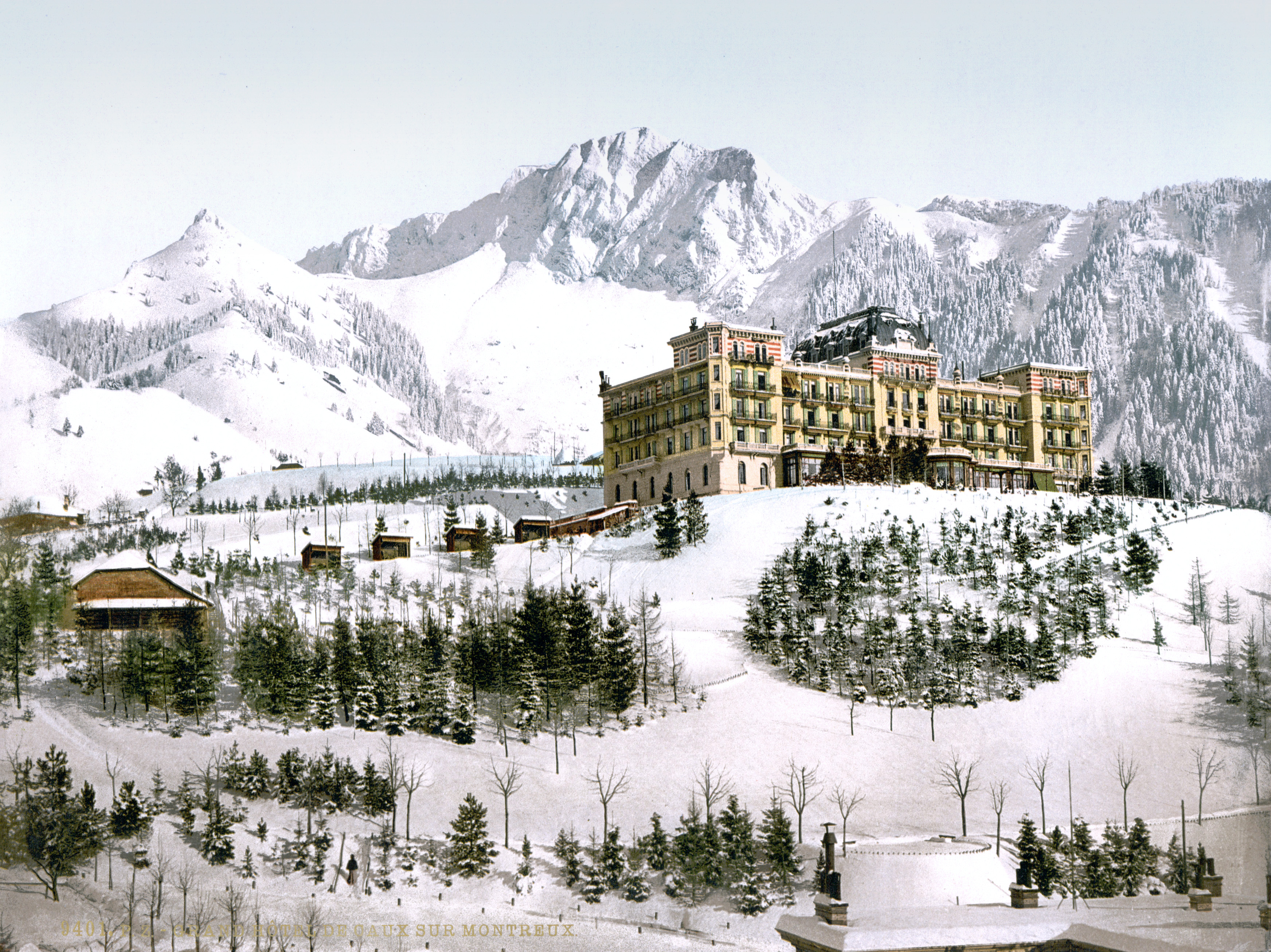
Grand Hotel in Caux

Aerial view (1948)

Caux (Montreux) is a small village in the Canton of Vaud, Switzerland which is part of the Montreux municipality. It looks out over Lake Geneva from an altitude of 1000 meters.

Overlooked by the Rochers de Naye summit (2000 meters), the Caux area was traditionally used only by cattle farmers. Late in the 19th century, local riviera hotels owners from Montreux and Territet became aware of the touristic potential of the Caux Mount. Simple inns came first, then the massive Caux Grand-Hôtel (1893), and finally, the spectacular Caux Palace Hotel (1902), masterpiece of Swiss architect Eugène Jost, gave Caux an international status, attracting the wealthiest and most famous guests including Empress Sissi of Austria-Hungary, Lord Robert Baden-Powell, Sacha Guitry, Edgar Wallace, prince Ibn Saud, future king of Saudi Arabia, John D. Rockefeller and the maharajah of Baroda.

World War I prematurely killed the Caux luxury hotels. In spite of the efforts of the hotel's owners, the golden years of the Belle Epoque would never return and the 1929 economic crisis and World War II brought all the hotels to bankruptcy for the last time.

During World War II, the hotels fell into disrepair and were used to house civilian refugees and interned escaped Allied prisoners of war. Finally some 1,600 Jews from the Kasztner train from Budapest found refuge there.

In 1946 the former Caux Palace Hotel was purchased and renovated by the Moral Re-Armament organization (MRA), for use as an international conference centre to work on the reconciliation of European peoples. They held many workshops and brought together people at many levels of government and society. The historians Douglas Johnston and Cynthia Sampson describe the MRA work as "important contribution to one of the greatest achievements in the entire record of modern statecraft: the astonishingly rapid Franco-German reconciliation after 1945.". The former Caux-Palace Hotel is still today the home of Initiatives of Change's conference centre, which can accommodate up to 450 people. The building is operated as a hotel school for much of the year, the Swiss Hotel Management School, though it still houses the Initiatives of Change annual conferences each summer.

The Caux Palace Hotel building can be seen from Montreux and the surrounding area. There is a small historical exhibition that is open to the public.

Caux also has two churches, both built in the early 20th century:

- The Protestant chapel, originally Anglican (1906), features an audacious timber frame, English style stained-glass windows (representing the deeds of the angels in the Bible), and a series of carved woods : angels on the side and foremost a singular boxwood altarpiece, representing a crucifixion in three dimensions, originating from Bruges.
- The Catholic chapel (1907).

Caux also offers a wide range of winter-related activities: the first bobsleigh world championship was organised in Caux in 1930. Alpine and cross-country skiing are easily practiced around the village, which also hosts an outdoor ice rink.

The village of Caux can be reached by train from Montreux, en route to the Rochers de Naye, or the Jaman Pass and peak. The area is popular with birdwatchers, as it lies along a major migration flyway for birds heading south in the autumn.
