= Caux Palace Hotel =

Former palace hotel in Caux, Switzerland

Coordinates: 46.4322°N 6.9375°E

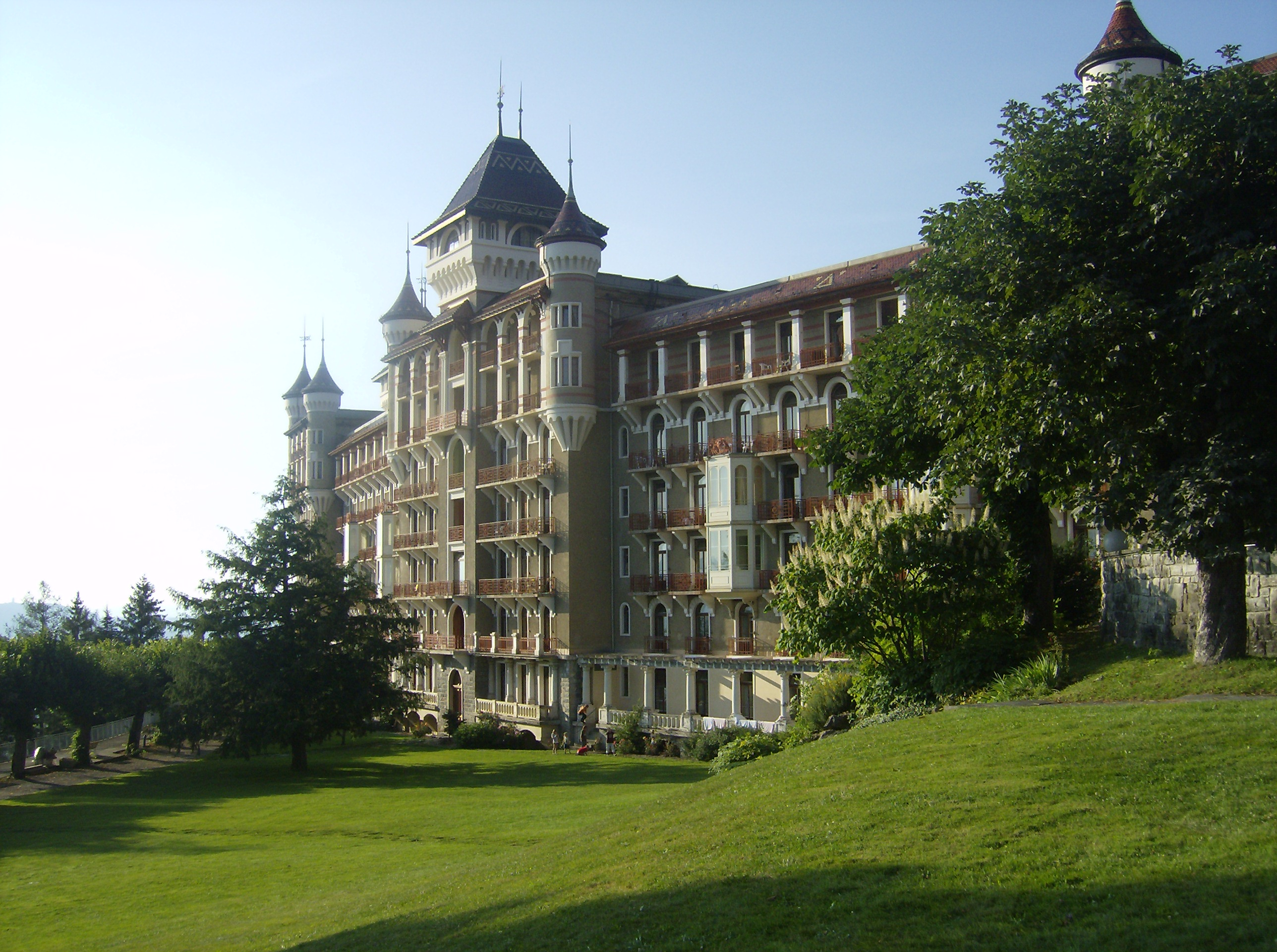

General information
- Architectural style: eclectic
- Location: Montreux, Vaud, Switzerland
- Completed: 7 July 1902
- Client: Ami Chessex

Design and construction
- Architect: Eugène Jost

The Caux Palace Hotel (French: Palace-Hôtel) is a former palace hotel located in the village of Caux, in the city of Montreux in the Vaud canton, in Switzerland.

Built on the Caux Mount by the Swiss architect Eugène Jost, it was inaugurated on 7 July 1902. The building rests on a 400-meter long terrace and is decorated with an abundance of towers and turrets with coloured tiles, which make it a remarkable feature of the Montreux landscape, visible from the whole Montreux Riviera region. It soon became an international venue first in the early 20th century as a luxury hotel, then from 1946 on as an international conference centre dedicated to the rebuilding of Europe under the leadership of the Swiss Initiatives of Change team. It is now also the seat of the Swiss Hotel Management School (SHMS) which uses the premises during the school semesters while Initiatives of Change keeps organising summer conferences there each year. The Caux-Palace Hotel is listed as a cultural property of national significance in Switzerland.

== History ==
=== Caux before the palace hotel ===
Until 1875, the area around Caux was only sparsely populated. The "Caux mountains" had always been used as a pasture for local farmers while the road to the Jaman pass was the shortest route towards the Sarine and Simmental valleys. In 1875 taking into account the rapid development of tourism on the lakeside where the first hotels had opened in 1837 in Montreux and in 1841 in Territet, Emile Monnier decided to transform his chalet on the Caux Mountain into an inn with a view to welcome the ramblers who started to explore the mountainside. This development had first affected the village of Glion, halfway between Montreux and Caux: a road to Glion was opened in 1850 and a cable-car service was opened between Territet and Glion in 1883.

About the same time local entrepreneurs became aware of the potential of Caux, almost 1000 meters above Glion. Philippe Faucherre, born in 1844 and his wife Louise Vauthier, both from hotel management background, were among them. In 1890 Faucherre bought a stone quarry in the area and built the Caux Grand Hotel in three years, all the needed material being brought to the construction site by mules for lack of other means of transportation.

The railway from Glion to Caux and to the Rochers-de-Naye summit was built at the same time and inaugurated in 1892 after only 15 months of works, a technical tour-de-force realized under the famous railway engineer Laubi. The extension of this railway between Montreux and Glion would wait 27 more years. The road to Caux was also opened at the same time by public works contractor Pierre Botelli.

The immediate success of the Grand Hotel, which attracted many prominent people to Caux, led other entrepreneurs to conceive the Caux Palace Hotel.

=== The construction of the Caux palace hotel ===
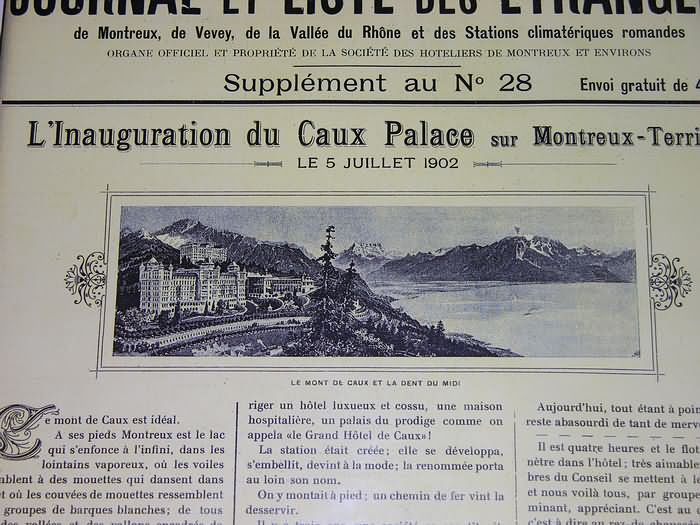
Newspaper announcing the inauguration of the Caux Place Hotel in 1902.

Five years after the Grand Hotel opening, Ami Chessex, who was the owner of the lakeside Territet Grand Hotel, decided to build a new hotel on a piece of land he owned at Caux, just under the Caux Grand Hotel – although the area was rather slopy. Early in 1899 a joint venture company was founded by Chessex and Faucherre with a capital of 2.5 million Swiss Francs. At the start of 1900 this company issued 3 million worth of bonds (and issued 500,000 francs more in 1903).

The first round of works consisted of an additional floor on top of the Hotel, the new floor added the capacity of 80 beds to the full site. Then in 1900, the construction works of the Caux Palace started. The main requirement was to make it the most advanced, most luxurious and biggest hotel ever built in Switzerland. As imagined by chief architect Eugène Jost, the construction started by a 400-meter long supporting wall along the hotel's site, allowing for the creation of a garden at the foot of the future hotel and for a promenade along this belvedere from which future Caux Palace Hotel customers would have a unique sight on the grand landscape of Lake Geneva and of the Alps.

Alfred Daulte, one of Jost's deputies, was to lead the works on site. It was difficult job given that there were up to 800 workers on site and that the progress of the construction was under close personal scrutiny from Ami Chessex, who used to walk up from Territet twice a week and did not hesitate to issue orders contradicting Daulte's. Nevertheless, the building and decoration works were completed in a little over two years, and on 7 July 1902, the Caux Palace Hotel was officially inaugurated in presence of the president of the Canton's executive, Mr Cossy, and of the whole Vaud government. The books of the Société immobilière de Caux showed a total cost of construction of 2,555,949 Swiss francs.

=== The Belle Epoque ===
Like its predecessor, the Caux Grand Hotel, the Caux Palace Hotel was immediately successful. Its visitors included figures such as Sacha Guitry, Paul Morand, Romain Rolland, Edgar Wallace, prince Ibn Saud, future king of Saudi Arabia, John D. Rockefeller and the maharajah of Baroda. The Maharaja stayed frequently at Caux, occupying most of the fourth floor. His personal room at the south-west corner of the building had a view and was furnished with lemon-tree wood furniture designed especially for him. This furniture and the room's original decoration have been preserved.

Two to three weeks of waiting time were sometimes necessary before the privilege of staying at the Caux Palace Hotel could be granted to the customers. Several smaller hotels were therefore built in Caux in the wake of the opening of the Caux Palace Hotel, such as the “Pavillon des Fougères” (later “Hotel Alpina”) or the “Hotel Maria”. A school was opened in Caux in 1905, an Anglican chapel was built in 1906 and a Catholic one in 1907. Many private chalets were also built around the same years. Winter sport facilities included ski and sledge slopes, three ice rinks for skating and a bobsleigh track. The World Bobsleigh Federation and the World Ice Hhockey Federation were created in Caux.

=== The dark years ===
1 August 1914 spelt the end of the golden years of luxury tourism in Switzerland. In a matter of a few days most of the customers had left the hotels, which would remain empty for the next five years. On 10 August, the few remaining Grand Hotel customers were transferred to the Caux Place Hotel and the Grand Hotel was then closed down. In 1917, Ami Chessex died after having struggled for three years to keep the company afloat. The cumulated loss at the end of the war would be of 1 million Swiss francs.

In 1919, war had at last stopped and everything could have returned to normal, but exchange rates were high for the Swiss Francs and the Caux hotels did not completely correspond with the new expectations of the customers. Therefore, in spite of a financial restructuration of the company in 1919, business remained disappointing. In 1925, the Grand Hotel was renovated and renamed Hotel Regina, in memory of Empress Sissi of Austria-Hungary who had resided there in 1898 just before being assassinated in Geneva.

The years 1927 and 1928 brought at last sizeable improvement for the Caux hotels. A second financial restructuration took place in 1929 in order to raise 1 million francs to renovate the Caux Palace Hotel. The bobsleigh world cup was organised in Caux in 1930. Unfortunately, the years 1930 to 1935 were most difficult as a result of the worldwide financial crisis. The value of the individual share of the Société immobilière de Caux had sunk from around 200 francs in 1900 to 1 francs in 1936. A fourth financial restructuration was insufficient to mend the situation and the board put the hotels up for sale as the losses piled up.

In 1938 the railway was converted from steam to electricity and the ski fashion reignited interest for Caux. The Caux Palace Hotel was renamed Hotel Esplanade and now targeted a less exclusive audience. However, in 1939 it had to stop all activities for good.

=== World War II ===
After the Caux Palace Hotel, most other hotels also had to gradually close down. In 1941, Hotel Regina was declared bankrupt and sold twice in a row. The Caux Palace Hotel reopened in May 1944 as a detention centre for English and American Air Force pilots escaped from Italian prisoner camps. Then from November 1944 to July 1945 they were replaced by Italian civilian refugees and from December 1944 by Jewish Hungarian refugees. This last group consisted of 1670 people who were on the Kasztner train. An oak tree was planted on the Caux terrace in memory of this convoy and a plaque was inaugurated there in 1999. It reads: “In memory of the Jewish refugees accommodated here during WWII, and in memory of those who were driven back by the Swiss borders. We shall not forget them.”

These various visitors of Caux degraded the buildings a lot. Everything that could have a market value like door knobs, locks, taps, etc. was dismantled and sold. This completed the ruin of the creators of the Caux Palace Hotel. Apart from the ground and of the building's shell, nothing was left of the 9 to 10 million Swiss Francs which had been invested there since 1890. It later turned out, however, that the caretaker of the Caux Palace Hotel, Robert Auberson, had been able to hide and store a lot of valuable pieces of furniture, as well as crockery and cutlery.

=== The salvage of the Caux Palace Hotel ===
In 1946, the derelict Caux Palace Hotel as well as the former Grand Hotel and other smaller hotel buildings in Caux looked like near their end. The bankrupt Société Immobilière de Caux had fallen into the hands of its main banker, Banque populaire de Montreux, who were looking for a quick way out and had put the whole lot on the market at a very low price. The most likely outcome was the demolition of the building in order to reuse its material.

But in an unexpected move, Geneva-born diplomat Philippe Mottu bid for the building with a small group of Swiss people. A graduate in theology and political science from Geneva university, Philippe Mottu had been associated with Frank Buchman and the Oxford Group since the mid-1930s and in 1943 he had had the recurring thought: "If Switzerland is spared by war, our task will be to put at the disposal of Frank Buchman a place where Europeans, torn apart by hatred, suffering and resentment, will be able to meet each other. Caux is the place."

The bankers as well as the city of Montreux mayor understood full well the positives of having an international conference centre in the area of Montreux and offered a "discount" price of 1.050.000 Swiss francs, giving Moral Rearmament a priority over other bidders. The Caux Foundation, which would administer the Caux Palace Hotel in the coming decades, being not yet in place, the sale contract was signed on 25 May 1946 by Philippe Mottu and Robert Hahnloser in their own name. It would take 95 individual Swiss donors to be able to reach the 450,000 Francs amount requested as first down payment on 1 July 1946. In-kind donations such as furniture, carpets also converged from all over Switzerland to help refurbish the former palace.

During six weeks, a team of international volunteers toiled day and night under the guidance of Swiss engineer Robert Hahnloser and his deputy, Dutch architect Jap de Boer, in order to repair the inside of the house. On 9 July 1946 the first meal cooked in the just enabled new kitchen was served to 150 guests. During that 1946 summer, 3000 people visited the new Caux conference centre. Dormitories were installed and some of the participants had to be allocated in nearby hotels. In 1946 and 1947 a series of needed transformations were performed in order to adapt the building to its new destiny: conversation of the ball room into a theater, new, larger entrance hall, etc. Lacking the adequate number of beds, the Caux Foundation bought the Grand Hotel and the Maria Hotel in 1947 and the Alpina Hotel in 1949, plus various smaller buildings.

=== The Caux Conference Centre ===
In the course of the next 50 years, the Caux Palace Hotel did not undergo any other significant modifications. Its history is marked by a long string of meetings organised by MRA, which in certain cases had political repercussions.

- 1946–1950: numerous meetings associating French and German participants, among whom the future protagonists of the Coal and Steel Community agreements, who found a mutual trust relationship through Caux. French MP Irène Laure led groups from Caux through Germany to ask for forgiveness and engage in dialogue.
- 1950: visit by a 60-people strong delegation of Japanese political and union leaders among whom several future cabinet members. They brought as a gift a small wooden cross made from the wood of a tree trunk found in the midst of the devastated city of Hiroshima.
- 1950: visit by a group of Ruhr miners, all Communist Party of Germany members or leaders, who wanted to add respect for moral values and personal change to the body of thought of the Party, and were expelled from it, remaining strongly rooted in Moral Rearmament.
- 1950–1956: launched from Caux, an action against corruption in Brazilian harbours was led by an international MRA team. This action spread to Rio de Janeiro favelas.
- 1950–1953: numerous visits by workers, managers and employers delegations, particularly from France, who created in Caux the necessary conditions for successful collective bargaining, resulting in the signing on 1 February 1951 of the first collective agreement in France.
- 1953–1960: Caux became a platform for contacts between leaders from African and other colonised nations and the representatives of colonial powers. It achieved dialogue for peaceful decolonisation in Tunisia and Morocco, and reconciliation in Kenya after the Mau Mau Rebellion.
- 1961: death of Frank Buchman. The transition years which followed impaired the progress of MRA activities, including in Caux, but the Caux Foundation succeeded in maintaining the Caux conferences.
- 1964: international agreement on jute rates’ stabilisation, reached thanks to the active, principles-based lobbying of French industrialist Robert Carmichael, a member of the Council of the Caux Foundation.
- 1967: opening of the MRA centre in Panchgani (India), which widened the outreach of MRA towards Asia.
- 1968–1969: visit of seven delegations from South Tyrol / Alto Adigio, which enabled a peaceful resolution of the hardened conflict there between the German-speaking and the Italian-speaking communities.
- 1977–1980: in close link with Caux, action for peaceful independence of former Rhodesia (currently Zimbabwe).
- 1986: launching of the Caux Round Table, a joint initiative of executives from presidents of European, Japanese and American companies, among whom Ryuzaburo Kaku (Canon) and Frits Philips (Philips).
- 1986–1995: interpersonal meetings between representatives of opposing groups enhanced reconciliation efforts in Lebanon, Cambodia, Somaliland, South Africa as well as among ethnic communities of large cities in OECD countries.
- 1993: launch of the "Foundations For Freedom" programme: thanks to their contacts in Eastern Europe, the West-European MRA teams launched a series of trainings to the ethical preconditions for a sound democracy. This programme evolved into a Ukraine-based organisation some years later.
- 1994: launching of an international ethical code of conduct for companies called "Caux principles for Business" by the Caux Round Table, followed by the development of a self-evaluation method for company ethics.
- 2000–2010: actions for peace and reconciliation in Burundi and in the African Great Lakes region, in partnership with the FDFA (Swiss foreign ministry). Meetings between government officials and rebellion leaders took place alternatively in Caux and on the ground.
- 2002: a federation of about 30 national sister associations, the Initiatives of Change International Association was founded, with its seat set in Caux.
- 2008–2012: at the initiative of Mohamed Sahnoun, the Caux Forums for Human Security brought together diplomats, politicians and NGOs around the great human security issues: conflicts, natural resources management, unsustainable economic policies, etc.
- 2013–2015: the Children as Actors of Transformation in Society (CATS) conferences gathered in Caux specialists of Children's rights, educators and delegations of children and teenagers from around the world.

== Architecture and Style ==
The Caux-Palace Hotel building surprises the observer both by its size and by its eclectic style.

=== General style ===
The building's style is often considered as neo-medieval and has earned the Caux Palace Hotel the nickname of "Sleeping Beauty Castle", whereas

"in reality it is by no means an archeological reconstruction. Architect Eugène Jost used only some elements with a medieval resemblance – possibly inspired by nearby Chillon Castle, a castle which Jost knew well, having restored it: bartizans, machicolations and the two towers supported by corbels which punctuate the apartments building … Their style is barely medieval: granted, it includes a few hood moulds and a few ogee arches, but also Florentine neo-Renaissance semi-circular arches with keystones, dual colours in French Louis XIII style, adding to that pieces of carved wood and coloured glazed tiles which belong as much to seaside resort style as to Victorian 'Heimatstil' … Therefore, you could say that the Caux Palace Hotel is not neo-medieval but 'post-neomedieval'. Its architect quoted freely Middle Ages models (castles) which he couldn’t really imitate because they were too distant from his own typology. He reused a few details only, bringing to life a whole medieval or even neomedieval imagery."

=== Enlivenment of the façade ===
Studying the façades of all hotels built by Eugène Jost, Professor Dave Lüthi from the University of Lausanne observed that, in order to avoid the hotel to look like barracks as could result from long rows of aligned hotel rooms windows, Jost contrived to counterbalance the horizontal deployment of the façades by an almost brutal articulation of vertical volumes and by the use of a few ornate bays which create a dynamic in the various sections of the façades (accentuation of dormers and roofs, contrasting with angles left free of any decoration).

In the case of the Caux Palace Hotel, which can probably be regarded as Jost's masterpiece, the South façade, which contains 271 windows, is ingeniously split in five parts and patterned by numerous protruding elements such as balconies, bow windows or a corbeling gallery on the last floor. In contrast to this part of the building, the common areas rooms is equipped with very large bay windows which somewhat blur the visitor's perception of the building from the gardens: these brutal scale changes are typical of eclectic architecture; they indicate the function of each part of the building and by bringing them together, oppose them, so as to warn the visitor about his own subjectivity: big or small are relative values.

Seen close by, the Caux Palace Hotel is an imposing sight because of its monumental size (which may be its main similarity with its so-called medieval models), yet it nevers "crushes" the observer; seen from afar only its cornice, roof and turrets can be seen: the Caux Palace Hotel, like a diadem set on top of the Caux Mount, becomes the giant advertisement for the site. The Caux Palace Hotel is therefore quite representative of the new trend launched by Eugène Jost:

"Playing with various loose elements such as balconies, loggias, carved decors, the architect assembles them in a composition which breaks with the academic approach of classic styles. Giving up gradually classic structures built around fascia, cornices and pilasters which characterise most of the production at the time, Jost gave this hotel a façade which in 1900 belonged only to this type of architecture."

=== Functionality ===
In the case of the Caux Palace Hotel as in his other hotel projects, Eugène Jost foremost concentrated on the general layout and on the façades. He unfolded his monumental buildings beyond the point where dimension became detrimental to usage.

"The customer must then cope with a long walk between the hotel’s entrance and his room (in difference with traditional hotels) but he is led to many discoveries on the way. The dimensions of the spaces he walks across, the diversity of the light sources, the luxury of the decors are as many surprises. Although room distribution may not be 'rational' in the sense which a Viollet-le-Duc or a Guadet would have had it, it is thought through as an architectural stroll around which the parallel world of services and servants revolves."

== Renovations ==
The Caux Foundation made several renovations in the course of the years, the most spectacular being in the course of the 1980s the complete renovation of the roofs; appropriate coloured glazed tiles could only be found in the region of Dijon (France) and they were bought with the financial assistance of the French Initiatives of Change association. The dining room had been redone in 1959 and a fresco by Finnish painter Lennart Segerstråle was then added.

The arrival of the Swiss Hotel Management School (SHMS) in 1995 as a tenant outside the conference season has allowed the Caux Foundation to do more to maintain and improve the ageing building and its surroundings. In some cases it was a matter of compliance with more demanding new regulations: there was a revamping of the kitchen in line with the most advanced professional norms, the installation of required fire detector systems and fireproof doors at strategic locations, the installation of separate collection and evacuation systems for wastewater and rainwater, etc. Another key work is the gradual renovation of over 200 bathrooms which had more or less remained early 20th century bathrooms. In other instances, there was a need to adapt to the requirements of the teaching activity of SHMS: creation of classrooms and of a new amphitheater, addition of an internet café. Some structures, such as the ground floor pergola, also received needed renovations.

However, from the cultural heritage viewpoint, the most interesting piece of work was the renovation of the great hall and of some historic rooms in 2007 and 2008 with support from Foundation Pro Patria, Loterie Romande and JP Morgan Chase. The challenge was to clean up and to restore the wall and ceiling frescoes of the great hall which had been created by Bernese painter Otto Haberer in 1902. The ceiling was particularly important as one of the largest ever painted in Switzerland and as the only one still in its original state. It is also unique by its decoration in Swiss Art deco style and by its cupola shape. The restoration works of the frescoes allowed reducing the visual impact of the various alterations they endured in time, to keep in place as much as possible the initial decorations’ substance and to bring to light two additional frescoes adorning the great Hall's decorative fireplace mantels.

These renovation works were led by specialists Olivier Guyot et Julian James and supervised by the “Monuments and Sites” section of the Vaud state, as well as by Swiss architect Eric Jaeger for the Caux Foundation.

At the end of 2015, the CAUX-Initiatives of Change Foundation had the heating system replaced, moving from oil to (local) wood heating. Fossil fuel CO_{2} emissions were lowered by 590 tons per year as a result. The fuel oil boilers and tanks had been installed in the early 1960s to replace the original 1902 six coal firing boilers.

== Fictional references ==
Caux, "where the thousand windows of a hotel burned in the late sun", is one of the locations featured in F. Scott Fitzgerald's novel Tender Is the Night (1934).

== Notes and references ==
This page is translated from the French Wikipedia page. Main sources are:

- Philippe Mottu: Caux, de la Belle Époque au Réarmement moral, publié en 1969 à la Baconnière, Neuchâtel, Suisse.
- Dave Lüthi : Eugène Jost, architecte du passé retrouvé, Presses polytechniques et universitaires romandes, Lausanne, 2001, pp. 52–54, ISBN 2880744563.
