= Initiatives of Change =

Organization

- Predecessor: Moral Re-Armament
- Founded: 2001; 25 years ago
- Type: Non-profit, interest group
- Headquarters: Geneva, Switzerland
- Location: Global
- Services: Conferences, campaigns
- Fields: Building trust
- Key people: Gerald Pillay, President, International Association, elected in 2021; Rajmohan Gandhi, Mohamed Sahnoun, former Presidents, International Association; Cornelio Sommaruga, Inaugural President
- Website: www.iofc.org

Initiatives of Change (IofC) is a global organisation dedicated to "building trust across the world's divides" of culture, nationality, belief, and background. Initiatives of Change was known as Moral Re-Armament (MRA) from 1938 to 2001, and the Oxford Group starting in 1929.

== Principles ==
These principles are taken from those of the organization's predecessor, Moral Re-Armament (MRA), founded in 1938 by Frank Buchman. Initiatives of Change has spiritual roots but no religious affiliation, and invites "those with a faith...both to explore the roots of their own tradition, and to discover and respect the beliefs of others." The name "Initiatives of Change" was adopted in 2001, expressing the emphasis of the organization in effecting social change beginning with personal change.

== Programs ==
Initiatives of Change has programs in over 60 countries. In the United States, Hope in the Cities promotes "honest conversations" on race, reconciliation and responsibility. Their approach was integrated in the One America Dialogue Guide published by the White House at the initiative of U.S. President Bill Clinton in 1998. The programme Trust and Integrity in the Global Economy holds events in a number of Western countries, focusing on overcoming corruption and building cooperation. In Switzerland, the Caux Forum for Human Security, brings together people working for peace and human security. In India, the IC Centre for Governance works with development experts, policy makers, social activists and others to strengthen the role of citizens in governance. Foundations for Freedom aims to support the development of democratic societies in Central and Eastern Europe. In Sierra Leone, Hope Sierra Leone is active in reconciling and rebuilding the country ravaged by civil war. In France Education à la paix (Education for Peace) is teaching students about civic responsibility, including the skills of conflict resolution.

Since 1991, when it was launched at the Initiatives of Change conference centre in Caux, Switzerland, the Creators of Peace (CoP) global peacemakers network has been active in many countries, particularly in Africa.

== Initiatives of Change International ==
Initiatives of Change International, a non-governmental organization based in Caux, Switzerland, is the legal and administrative entity that coordinates the national bodies of Initiatives of Change; It holds Special Consultative Status with the United Nations Economic and Social Council, and Participatory Status at the Council of Europe. Its first president was Cornelio Sommaruga, formerly President of the International Committee of the Red Cross. He was succeeded by Mohamed Sahnoun, formerly Senior Advisor to UN Secretary-General Kofi Annan. In 2009 Prof. Rajmohan Gandhi, historian and biographer of his grandfather Mahatma Gandhi, was elected president. In 2012 Dr Omnia Marzouk, a paediatrician originally from Egypt and now based in UK, was elected president. In 2014 Initiatives of Change was awarded the Ousseimi Prize for Tolerance. In 2019 Suresh Vazirani, founder of one of India's largest medical diagnostic companies, was elected president. Gerald Pillay, Vice Chancellor and Rector of Liverpool Hope University in England, took over from Suresh Vazirani in January 2022.

== Conference centres ==
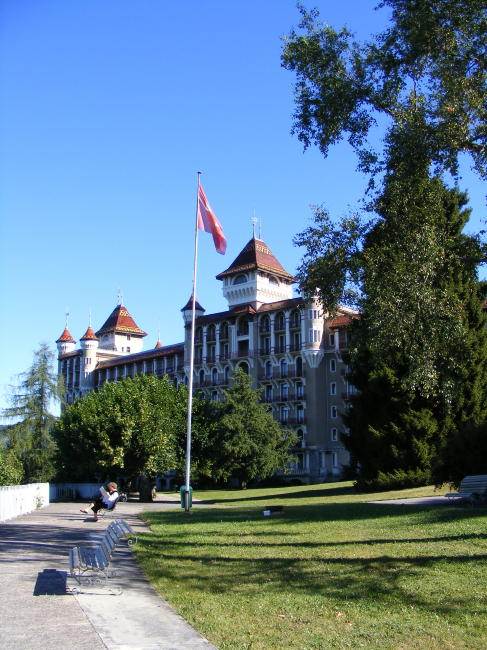
Mountain House, the Initiatives of Change conference centre

Initiatives of Change has centres in numerous countries. The largest conference centres are Mountain House, formerly the Caux Palace Hotel in Caux, near Montreux, and Asia Plateau, in Panchgani in India.

Mountain House was a derelict hotel in 1946, when it was bought by 100 Swiss families, and restored as a place where the warring nations of Europe could meet. In the following years thousands came there, including German Chancellor Adenauer and French Foreign Minister Robert Schuman. At Caux many found reconciliation with former enemies, notably the French socialist leader Irène Laure who had been active in the French Resistance and who, thereafter, devoted herself to building Franco-German understanding. Edward Luttwak described the work of Caux as an "important contribution to one of the greatest achievements in the entire record of modern statecraft: the astonishingly rapid Franco-German reconciliation after 1945."

In the following decades Caux welcomed people from African and Asian countries moving towards independence from colonial rule. In 1956, soon after Morocco became independent, King Mohammed V of Morocco sent a message to Frank Buchman: "I thank you for all you have done for Morocco in the course of these last testing years." In 1960 Archbishop Makarios and Dr Kucuk, President and vice-president of Cyprus, jointly sent the first flag of independent Cyprus to Caux in recognition of the center's help. More recently, groups of opposing factions in the Great Lakes area of Africa, Sierra Leone and other areas of conflict, have met there.

Also prominent in the center's programs have been meetings between management and unions. The Caux Round Table was launched there in 1986, and continues to meet there. It developed a program of Principles for Business which are now used widely in business and industry.

Each summer the centre holds a series of conferences dealing with specific subjects, attended by both teenagers and adults. In 2008 the first Caux Forum for Human Security, initiated by Mohamed Sahnoun, brought together 300 people working for peace and human security. and this has developed into an annual conference on 'Just Governance for Human Security'. 'Land, Lives, Peace' brings together people from many countries working to restore degraded land to productive use. 'Children as Actors for Transforming Society' deals with children's rights and children's participation in partnership with a coalition of civil society organisation such as the Child-to-Child Trust and Learning for Well-being or the International Janusz Korczak Association.

Asia Plateau in India holds conferences throughout most of the year, dealing with ethical governance, cooperation for development and conflict resolution. These bring together workers and managers from many industries, NGO leaders, public servants, and others. It also holds international conferences such as 'Making democracy real' and 'Dialogue on Just Governance', which bring together participants from over 40 countries.
