= Caux Round Table =

International business social organization

- Founded: 1986
- Founder: Frits Philips and Olivier Giscard d'Estaing
- Purpose: to promote ethical and sustainable business practices and facilitate fair international trade
- Location(s): Caux, Switzerland, and Minnesota, United States
- Region served: World
- Website: http://www.cauxroundtable.org/

The Caux Round Table (CRT) is an international organization of senior business executives formed to promote ethical business practices. It was founded in 1986 by Frits Philips, President of Philips, Olivier Giscard d'Estaing, and Ryuzaburo Kaku, President of Canon. The current Global Executive Director is lawyer and business author Stephen B. Young.

Frits Philips founded CRT to build trust between international executives and to implement Corporate Social Responsibility practices, in the face of concerns that Japanese exports would flood the Western market and cause a trade war. The CRT’s Principles for Business were published in 1994, incorporating Western and Japanese concepts (such as 'kyosei', the working together for the common good). It was presented at the 1994 UN Social Summit in Copenhagen.

The CRT holds an annual meeting and produces guides for different types of organizations. Every three years, the annual meeting is held at Caux, Switzerland, where the original initiative took place in 1986.
