= Henry Kissinger and the Vietnam War =

Overview of Henry Kissinger's role in the Vietnam War

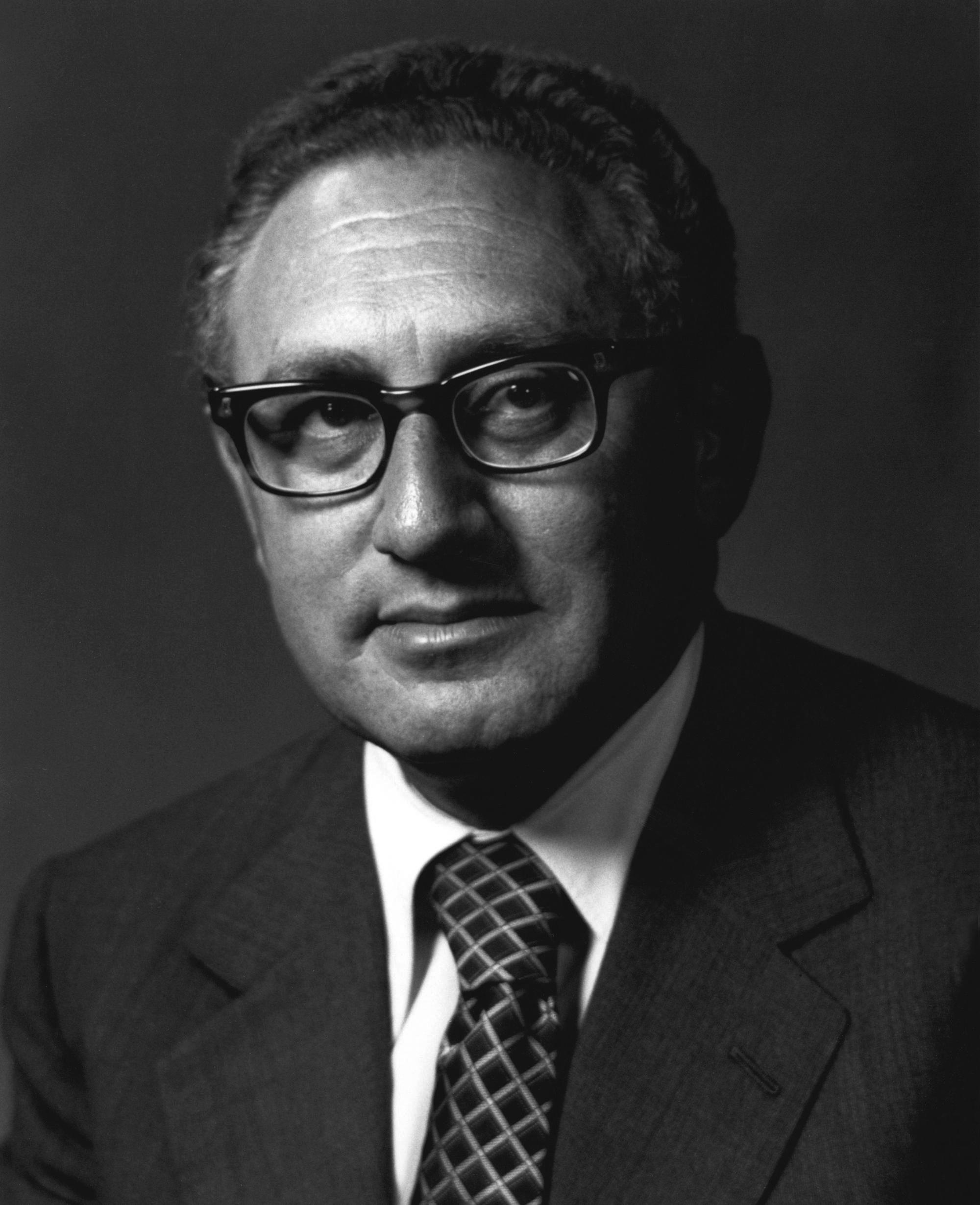
Official portrait of Henry Kissinger (1923–2023) in c. 1973

American diplomat Henry Kissinger (1923–2023) played an important and controversial role in the Vietnam War. Starting out as a supporter, Kissinger came to see it as a drag on American power. In 1968, Kissinger leaked information about the status of the peace talks in Paris to the Nixon campaign and was rewarded with being appointed National Security Advisor under Richard Nixon. As National Security Advisor, Kissinger sought initially to find a way to end the war on American terms. During his tenure, Kissinger came to differ with Nixon as Kissinger was more in favor of seeking an end to war as expeditiously as possible with minimum damage to American prestige. In October 1972, Kissinger reached a draft agreement that Nixon at first rejected, leading to the Christmas bombings of December 1972. The agreement that Kissinger signed in January 1973—which led to the American withdrawal from Vietnam in March of that year—was very similar to the draft agreement rejected the previous year. As National Security Advisor and Secretary of State, Kissinger favored continued American support for South Vietnam right until the collapse of that state in April 1975, which Kissinger blamed on Congress.

== Academic amateur diplomat ==
As an instructor at Harvard, Kissinger published his 1957 book Nuclear Weapons and Foreign Policy, whose popularity established his reputation as one of America's leading thinkers on foreign policy. Kissinger's involvement in Indochina started prior to his appointment as National Security Advisor to Nixon. While still at Harvard, he had worked as a consultant on foreign policy to both the White House and State Department. Kissinger says that "In August 1965 ... [Henry Cabot Lodge Jr.], an old friend serving as Ambassador to Saigon, had asked me to visit Vietnam as his consultant. I toured Vietnam first for two weeks in October and November 1965, again for about ten days in July 1966, and a third time for a few days in October 1966 ... Lodge gave me a free hand to look into any subject of my choice". He became convinced of the meaninglessness of military victories in Vietnam, "... unless they brought about a political reality that could survive our ultimate withdrawal". Lodge allowed Kissinger to go anywhere he wanted, and to meet the ruling duumvirate of Air Marshal Nguyễn Cao Kỳ and General Nguyễn Văn Thiệu. In a gaffe, Kissinger spoke frankly to an American reporter, Jack Foisie, who had arrived late to the press conference and was not aware that the press conference was "off-the-record". Kissinger called both Air Marshal Kỳ and General Thiệu immature men of low intelligence, remarks that Foise published and which drew the ire of President Lyndon B. Johnson. In November 1965, when asked to comment by Time after the number of Americans killed in Vietnam passed 1,000, Kissinger praised Johnson for having to make "difficult and lonely decisions". Kissinger compared Johnson to the sheriff played by Gary Cooper in the 1952 film High Noon, depicting Johnson as a heroic figure making necessary, but unpopular decisions.

In a 1967 peace initiative, he would mediate between Washington and Hanoi. In June 1967, at an academic conference in Paris, Kissinger met a French biologist, Herbert Marcovitch, who mentioned that one of his friends was Raymond Aubrac, a Communist hero of the French resistance, who in turn was one of the few Westerners who were friends with Ho Chi Minh. Ho had something of an aversion to Westerners and tried to avoid meeting them as much as possible, and Aubrac was unique in being allowed to correspond with Ho. Wanting to play a role in diplomacy, Kissinger contacted the State Department with a plan for Marovitch and Aubrac to go to Hanoi with a peace offer. The Secretary of State, Dean Rusk, was opposed to Kissinger's plan. However, W. Averell Harriman of the "peace shop" was interested and got President Johnson to approve the approach, which was code-named Operation Pennsylvania. In July 1967, Aubrac and Marcovitch went to Hanoi to see Ho, who told him that he was willing to open peace talks with the United States, provided that the Americans "unconditionally" stopped bombing North Vietnam. Before Ho had insisted that the United States had to "unconditionally and finally" stop the bombing, and this slight change in phrasing was seen as a hopeful sign. Harriman sent his deputy, Chester Cooper, to join Kissinger in the unofficial peace talks in Paris, which seemed promising. However, Aubrac stated that Ho had wanted the United States to cease bombing North Vietnam for a short period of time as a sign of good faith, but the National Security Advisor, W.W. Rostow, persuaded Johnson to increase the bombing of North Vietnam at the same time. On 22 August 1967, Aubrac and Marcovitch were refused visas to visit North Vietnam as the inability of Kissinger to achieve the promised bombing pause had disillusioned Ho.

In August 1968, Kissinger wrote to Harriman, who was leading the American delegation at the Paris peace talks: "My dear Averell...I am through with Republican politics. The party is hopeless and unfit to govern". On 17 September 1968, Kissinger arrived in Paris and served as an unofficial consultant to the American delegation. At the time, Kissinger spoke of his disgust with the Republican candidate, Richard Nixon, saying: "Three days of the week I think I'll vote for Hubert. The other days I think I won't vote at all". But at the same time, Kissinger was in contact with the Nixon campaign and began to share information about the progress of the peace talks. Kissinger began to call Richard Allen, Nixon's foreign policy adviser, from a public telephone booth, offering information in exchange for which he wanted a senior position if Nixon won the election. On 12 October 1968, Kissinger told Allen that Harriman persuaded Johnson to order a bombing halt of North Vietnam. Allen called John Mitchell, Nixon's campaign manager, who agreed that this was most important information. As a reward, Mitchell told Allen that Kissinger would receive the senior post he craved, with Allen saying the office of National Security Advisor would suit Kissinger the best. At the same time, Kissinger was in contact with the Democratic candidate, Vice President Hubert Humphrey, lobbying for a senior post if Humphrey won the election.

Kissinger had served as the foreign policy adviser to the Republican governor of New York, Nelson Rockefeller, during his failed bids to win the Republican nomination in the elections of 1960, 1964 and 1968. He had a low opinion of Nixon during this time, speaking of his "shallowness" and of his "dangerous misunderstanding" of foreign policy. Many were surprised when Kissinger accepted Nixon's offer to serve as his National Security Advisor. Nixon said of Kissinger: "I don't trust Henry, but I can use him".

== Involvement in Vietnam War decision making (1969) ==
=== Arrival in Washington ===
Nixon had been elected in 1968 on the promise of achieving "peace with honor" and ending the Vietnam War. By promising to continue the peace talks which Johnson began in May 1968 in Paris, Nixon admitted that he had ruled out "a military victory" in Vietnam. Nixon wanted a diplomatic settlement similar to the armistice of Panmunjom that ended the Korean War and frequently stated in private he had no intention of being "the first president of the United States to lose a war". To force the North Vietnamese to sign an armistice, Nixon favored a two-pronged approach of the "madman theory" of seeking to act rashly to intimidate the North Vietnamese while at the same time trying using the strategy of "linkage" to improve relations with the Soviet Union and China in order to persuade both these nations to stop sending arms to North Vietnam. In office, Nixon implemented a policy of Vietnamization that aimed to gradually withdraw U.S. troops while expanding the combat role of the South Vietnamese Army so that it would be capable of independently defending its government against the National Front for the Liberation of South Vietnam, a Communist guerrilla organization, and the North Vietnamese army (Vietnam People's Army or PAVN). Kissinger was opposed to Vietnamization.

In an article published in Foreign Affairs in January 1969, Kissinger criticized General William Westmoreland's attrition strategy because the Vietnamese Communists were willing to accept far higher losses on the battlefield than the United States and could therefore "win" as long as they did not "lose" by merely keeping the war going. In the same article, he argued that losses endured by the Vietnamese Communists in the Tet Offensive were meaningless as the Tet Offensive had turned American public opinion against the war, ruling out the possibility of a military solution, and the best that could be done now was to negotiate the most favorable peace settlement at the Paris peace talks. Kissinger, when he came into office in 1969 favored a negotiating strategy under which the United States and North Vietnam would sign an armistice and agreed to pull their troops out of South Vietnam while the South Vietnamese government and the Viet Cong were to agree to a coalition government. Kissinger had doubts about Nixon's theory of "linkage", believing that this would give the Soviet Union leverage over the United States and, unlike Nixon, was less concerned about the ultimate fate of South Vietnam. One of Kissinger's first acts as National Security Advisor in early 1969 was to seek opinions of the Vietnam experts within the CIA, the military and the State Department. The lengthy volume that emerged contained a diverse collection of opinions, with some stating the South Vietnamese were making "rapid strides," while others doubted that the government in Saigon would "ever constitute an effective political or military counter to the Vietcong". The "bulls" estimated that American troops would need to fight on in Vietnam for 8.3 years before the South Vietnamese would be able to fight on their own while the "bears" estimated it would take 13.4 years of American troops fighting in Vietnam before the South Vietnamese would be able to fight on their own. Kissinger passed the volume on to Nixon with the comment that there was no consensus within the expert community with the implied conclusion that he should be free to act on his own without consulting the experts.

=== Nixon's key decision maker ===
On 17 February 1969, Nixon then told the Soviet ambassador Anatoly Dobrynin that all matters of substance were to go through Kissinger rather than the Secretary of State William Rogers. Shortly afterwards, Kissinger met with Dobrynin to tell him that Nixon would not accept any settlement that looked like a defeat nor did he want any change in the regime in Saigon, though "evolution" of the Saigon regime was acceptable. Dobrynin, who served in Washington for many years, had a favorable impression of Kissinger, who was not dogmatic and rigid like his predecessor W.W. Rostow nor dull and unimaginative like Dean Rusk. Kissinger then set about undermining Henry Cabot Lodge Jr., the head of the American peace delegation in Paris, as he asked Dobrynin to set up a secret meeting in Paris between him and Le Duc Tho, the most important member of the North Vietnamese delegation in Paris.

On 22 February 1969, the Viet Cong launched an offensive in South Vietnam, which Kissinger called "an act of extraordinary cynicism". Nixon, on a trip to Europe, took the offensive as a personal insult and wanted to bomb Cambodia in retaliation. Kissinger persuaded Nixon to wait until his European trip was over.

As part of the "linkage" concept, Kissinger in March 1969 sent Cyrus Vance to Moscow with the message that if the Soviet Union pressured North Vietnam into a diplomatic settlement favorable to the United States, the reward would be concessions on the talks on limiting the nuclear arms race. At the same time, Kissinger met with Dobrynin to warn him that Nixon was a dangerous man who wanted to escalate the Vietnam war. In April 1969, North Korea shot down a U.S. Navy plane on a spy mission, killing 31 airmen. Kissinger wanted to bomb a North Korean air base in retaliation, being opposed by the Defense Secretary Melvin Laird, the Secretary of State William Rogers and General Earle Wheeler, the chairman of the joint chiefs of staff, who all warned that to bomb North Korea might start a second war in Asia. Kissinger argued that bombing North Korea would help end the Vietnam war, saying: "Hanoi might say, 'This guy [Nixon] is becoming irrational'-and we'd better settle with him". Unable to gain support at the National Security Council, Kissinger appealed to Nixon's Domestic Affairs Adviser, John Ehrlichman, saying that, though striking in North Korea might cause a second Korean war, it might also help with the Vietnam war. When Ehrlichman asked Kissinger how far things might escalate if the U.S. bombed North Korea, he was told: "Well, it could go nuclear". Ehrlichman came away convinced that Kissinger with his thick German accent, academic titles, advocacy of a ruthless foreign policy and a role as a senior presidential adviser seemed too much like the eponymous character of the 1964 black comedy Dr. Strangelove and advised Nixon not to strike North Korea, advice that was accepted. Starting in April 1969, Kissinger pressed for a plan code-named Operation Duck Hook, which would see the United States return to bombing North Vietnam and possibly use nuclear weapons.

Nixon and Kissinger played a "good cop-bad cop" routine with Dobrynin, with Nixon acting the part of the petulant president at the end of his patience with North Vietnam, while Kissinger acted as the reasonable diplomat anxious to improve relations with the Soviet Union, saying to Dobrynin in May 1969 that Nixon would "escalate the war" if the Soviet Union "didn't produce a settlement" in Vietnam. At another meeting in 1969, Kissinger warned Dobrynin that "the train has just left the station and is now headed down the track", saying the Soviet Union better start pressuring North Vietnam now before Nixon did something truly reckless and dangerous. The attempt at "linkage" failed as the Soviet Union did not pressure North Vietnam and instead Dobrynin told Kissinger that the Soviets wanted better relations with the United States regardless of the Vietnam War. After the failure of the "linkage" attempt, Nixon became more open to the alternative strategy suggested by the Defense Secretary Melvin Laird who argued that the burden of the war should be shifted to the South Vietnamese, which was initially called "de-Americanization" and which Laird renamed Vietnamization because it sounded better.

=== Bombing of Cambodia ===
In early 1969, Kissinger was opposed to the plans for Operation Menu, the bombing of Cambodia, but on 16 March 1969 Nixon at a meeting at the White House attended by Kissinger announced the bombing would start the next day. As Congress was unlikely to grant approval to bomb Cambodia, Nixon decided to go ahead without Congressional approval and kept the bombings secret, a decision that several constitutional law experts later argued was illegal. On 17 March 1969, B-52 bombers started to bomb the supposed location of the COSVN in an operation code-named Breakfast; Kissinger stated later that he found the name Operation Breakfast be in bad taste. Though Kissinger had initially opposed Operation Menu, he started to champion the bombing. In May 1969, the Operation Menu bombing of Cambodia was leaked to journalist William M. Beecher of the New York Times who published an article about it, which infuriated Kissinger. As a result, the phones of 13 members of Kissinger's staff were tapped by the FBI without a warrant to find the leaker. Nixon considered Kissinger to be "obsessive and paranoid" and was annoyed with his endless in-fighting with Laird and Rogers. Kissinger accused Laird of leaking Operation Menu.

=== Secret peace discussions, opposition to troop withdrawals ===
In June 1969, the former Defense Secretary Clark Clifford published an article in Foreign Affairs calling for the withdraw of 100,000 U.S. troops from Vietnam by the end of 1969 and all by the end of 1970. Influenced by Laird, Nixon announced the immediate withdraw of 25,000 U.S. troops from Vietnam, saying: "I would hope that we could beat Mr. Clifford's timetable". Kissinger was opposed to the withdrawal, which he predicted would mean the immediate collapse of South Vietnam.

On 4 August 1969, Kissinger met secretly with Xuân Thủy at the Paris apartment of Jean Sainteny to discuss peace. Sainteny was a former French colonial official sympathetic to Vietnamese nationalism who had offered to serve as an honest broker. Kissinger had been hoping to see Tho rather than Thuy. Kissinger repeated the American offer of "mutual withdrawal" of U.S. and North Vietnamese forces from South Vietnam, which Thủy rejected, while Thủy demanded a new government in Saigon, which Kissinger rejected. Kissinger had a low opinion of North Vietnam, saying "I can't believe that a fourth-rate power like North Vietnam doesn't have a breaking point". Kissinger was opposed to the strategy of Vietnamization, expressing some doubt about the ability of the ARVN (Army of the Republic of Vietnam-i.e. the South Vietnamese Army) to hold the field, causing much tension with Defense Secretary Laird who was deeply committed to Vietnamization. In September 1969, Kissinger, in a memo, advised Nixon against "de-escalation", saying that keeping U.S. troops fighting in Vietnam "remains one of our few bargaining weapons". In the same memo, Kissinger stated he was "deeply disturbed" that Nixon had started pulling out U.S. troops, saying that withdrawing the troops was like "salted peanuts" to the American people ("The more U.S troops come home, the more will be demanded"), giving the advantage to the enemy who merely had to "wait us out". Instead, he recommenced that the United States resume bombing North Vietnam and mine the coast. Later in September 1969, Kissinger proposed a plan for what he called a "savage, punishing" blow against North Vietnam code-named Duck Hook to Nixon, arguing that this was the best way to force North Vietnam to agree to peace on American terms. Laird was strongly opposed to Duck Hook, warning Nixon that the use of nuclear weapons to kill a massive number of North Vietnamese civilians would alienate American public opinion from the administration and persuaded Nixon to reject it. Reflecting his background as a Harvard professor of political science who belonged to the Primat der Aussenpolitik school, which saw foreign policy as belonging only to a small elite, Kissinger was less sensitive to public opinion than Laird, a former Republican congressman who constantly advised Nixon to keep American public opinion in mind. Laird used the National Moratorium protests of 15 November 1969 to persuade Nixon to cancel Duck Hook, arguing that if the war as it was had caused the largest demonstrations ever in American history, then Kissinger's plans for Duck Hook would alienate the public even more.

== Cambodian controversy (1970) ==
The Paris peace talks had become stalemated by late 1969, owing to the obstructionism of the South Vietnamese delegation who wanted the talks to fail. The South Vietnamese President Nguyễn Văn Thiệu did not want the United States to withdraw from Vietnam, and out of frustration with him, Kissinger decided to begin secret peace talks in Paris parallel to the official talks that the South Vietnamese were unaware of. On 21 February 1970, in a modest house in a Paris suburb, Kissinger secretly met Lê Đức Thọ, the North Vietnamese diplomat who was to become his most tenacious adversary. In 1981, Kissinger told the journalist Stanley Karnow: "I don't look back on our meetings with any great joy, yet he was a person of substance and discipline who defended the position he represented with dedication". Not until February 1971 were Rogers and Laird first informed of the parallel peace talks in Paris. Kissinger was to meet Tho three times between February–April 1970, and the North Vietnamese first sensed a softening of the American position during these talks as Kissinger slightly altered the "mutual withdrawal formula" that the Americans had previously held to. Nixon was gravely disappointed that the secret talks in Paris did not have the prompt results he wanted. Kissinger wrote in his memoirs that "historians rarely do justice to the psychological stress on a policy-maker", noting that by early 1970 Nixon was feeling very much besieged and inclined to lash out against a world he was believed was plotting his downfall. Nixon had been humiliated by having two successive nominees to the Supreme Court rejected by the Senate, his failure to end the Vietnam war in 1969 as he had promised had embittered him and in early 1970 his approval ratings in the polls were declining. Nixon had become obsessed with the film Patton, seeing how the film presented Patton as a solitary and misunderstood genius whom the world did not appreciate a parallel to himself and kept watching the film over and over again.

=== Bombing of Laos ===
In February 1970, several senators led by J. William Fulbright and Stu Symington first learned that the United States had been bombing Laos since December 1964, which led to complaints in Congress about the "secret war" in Laos. Nixon reluctantly decided to admit to the "secret war", and directed Kissinger to issue the necessary statement to the media. Kissinger's statement admitted to the bombing of Laos, but also claimed: "No American stationed in Laos has ever been killed in ground combat operations". Two days later, it emerged that a U.S. Army captain had been killed while fighting in Laos and subsequently the Pentagon admitted that in the period February 1969-February 1970 a total of 27 Americans had been killed in Laos. Kissinger claimed that he had not lied, maintaining that all Americans killed in Laos were in "hot pursuit" when chasing the enemy from South Vietnam into Laos, but this argument made no impression. Nixon stated: "No one cares about B-52 strikes in Laos, but people worry about our boys out there". Nixon refused to see Kissinger for the next week, saying that his statement about Laos had caused him to drop 11 points in the public opinion polls.

=== Coup in Cambodia ===
In the spring of 1970 Kissinger was under immense strain as several of his aides were planning to resign to protest the upcoming U.S invasion of Cambodia, and his liberal friends from Harvard were pressuring him to resign as well while Nixon was all for more belligerence. Much of Kissinger's staff were deeply opposed to the invasion of Cambodia. Kissinger asked one of his aides, William Watts, to be in charge of National Security Council staffing for the coming invasion. Watts refused, saying he was opposed to the invasion on moral grounds, causing Kissinger to shout: "Your views represent the cowardice of the Eastern Establishment!" Watts resigned on the spot. As Watts was writing his resignation letter, Kissinger's deputy, Alexander Haig, appeared to tell him on behalf of Kissinger: "You've just had an order from your commander in chief. You can't quit". Watts replied: "Fuck you Al! I just did".

Kissinger received a phone call from Nixon and his best friend, Charles "Bebe" Rebozo, who both sounded very drunk; Nixon began the call and then handed the phone to Rebozo who said: "The President wants you to know if this doesn't work, Henry, it's your ass". On 30 April 1970, the United States invaded Cambodia, which Nixon announced in a television address that Kissinger contemptuously called "vintage Nixon" because of his overblown rhetoric. At the time, Nixon was seen as recklessly escalating the war, and in early May 1970, the largest protests ever against the Vietnam War took place. Four of Kissinger's aides resigned in protest, while the Cambodian "incursion" ended several of Kissinger's friendships with colleagues from Harvard when he chose not to resign. Two of Kissinger's senior aides, Anthony Lake and Roger Morris, in a joint resignation letter, stated they could not in good conscience continue to serve the administration. Nixon, in his memoirs, claimed that Kissinger "took a particularly hard line" with regards to the "Cambodian incursion". Morris recalled that Kissinger was frightened by the huge antiwar demonstrations, comparing the antiwar movement to the Nazis. Kissinger was afraid to go home to his apartment, and instead lived in his office at the White House basement during the protests against the "Cambodian incursion". Kissinger was haunted by memories of his youth in Germany and had a deep distrust of mass movements of either the left or the right, favoring the Primat der Aussenpolitik school of foreign policy-making by an elite with the masses excluded. In his interview with Karnow, Kissinger maintained he felt torn about where he stood and blamed Nixon for his failure to find "the language of respect and compassion that might have created a bridge at least to the more reasonable elements of the antiwar movement". When several Harvard professors called on Kissinger to resign, he claimed: "If you only knew what I am staving off the right", claiming he was opposed to the invasion. After the resignations of Kissinger's aides, Nixon took away the authority to tap phones, which he had given Kissinger in May 1969, and gave it to the attorney general, John Mitchell. Unknown to Kissinger, Mitchell had been illegally tapping his phone since the fall of 1969.

Adding to the tension, on 2 May 1970, U.S. aircraft bombed North Vietnam for the first time since 1968, causing Senator Fulbright to say, "Good God", when he heard the news. Senate Majority Leader Mike Mansfield said he had trouble believing that Nixon and Kissinger were so reckless. To Nixon, Kissinger accused Laird and/or Rogers of leaking the news of the bombing raid on North Vietnam and asked for the FBI to tap their phones. Without informing Nixon, on 4 May 1970, Laird announced the end of the bombing raids on North Vietnam. On the night of 8 May 1970, Nixon, who had been rattled by the protests, stayed up all night, drinking heavily and randomly phoning people he knew. Between 11:00 pm–2:00 am, Nixon made forty calls, with Kissinger receiving eight of the calls. The Cambodian "incursion" saw American and South Vietnamese troops take the areas of eastern Cambodia that American commanders called the Fish Hook and Parrot's Beak and capture an impressive haul of arms originating from China and the Soviet Union. However, the majority of Vietnamese Communist forces had withdrawn deeper into Cambodia before the invasion, with only a small number left behind to wage a fighting retreat to avoid charges of cowardice. Kissinger suggested another meeting with Tho in Paris, only to receive a note reading: "The U.S. words of peace are just empty ones". Kissinger's deputy, Haig, went to Phnom Penh to meet Lon Nol, who complained the invasion had not helped as it had only pushed the North Vietnamese and the Viet Cong deeper into Cambodia. In June 1970, the Americans pulled out of Cambodia, and the Vietnamese Communists returned, though the loss of weapons greatly hindered their operations in the Saigon area for the rest of 1970. Having committed itself to supporting Lon Nol, the United States now had two allies instead of one to support in Southeast Asia.

The bombing campaign in Cambodia contributed to the chaos of the Cambodian Civil War, which saw the forces of leader Lon Nol unable to retain foreign support to combat the growing Khmer Rouge insurgency that would overthrow him in 1975. Documents uncovered from the Soviet archives after 1991 reveal that the North Vietnamese invasion of Cambodia in 1970 was launched at the explicit request of the Khmer Rouge and negotiated by Pol Pot's then second in command, Nuon Chea. The American bombing of Cambodia resulted in 40,000–150,000 deaths from 1969 to 1973, including at least 5,000 civilians. Pol Pot biographer David P. Chandler argues that the bombing "had the effect the Americans wanted—it broke the Communist encirclement of Phnom Penh". However, Ben Kiernan and Taylor Owen suggest that "the bombs drove ordinary Cambodians into the arms of the Khmer Rouge, a group that seemed initially to have slim prospects of revolutionary success." Kissinger himself defers to others on the subject of casualty estimates: "...since I am in no position to make an accurate estimate of my own, I consulted the OSD Historian, who gave me an estimate of 50,000 based on the tonnage of bombs delivered over the period of four and a half years."

A number of Republican politicians complained to Nixon that his stance on Vietnam was hurting their chances for congressional elections in November 1970, leading the president to say to Kissinger it was natural that liberals like Senator George McGovern and Senator Mark Hatfield wanted to "bug out...But when the Right starts wanting to get out, for whatever reason, that's our problem". In an attempt to change Nixon's image, Kissinger and Nixon devised the notion of a "standstill cease-fire," where both sides would occupy whatever areas of South Vietnam they were holding at the time of the ceasefire, an offer that Nixon publicly made in a television address on 7 October 1970. In his speech, Nixon apparently moved away from the "mutual withdrawal formula" the North Vietnamese kept rejecting by not mentioning it, winning much acclaim, even from his opponents like McGovern and Hatfield (though he also said the withdrawal of U.S. forces would be "based on principles" he had "previously" discussed, i.e. the "mutual withdrawal formula"). Kissinger and Nixon both disliked the idea of a "standstill ceasefire," as they felt it would weaken South Vietnam, but fearing the possibility of Nixon not being reelected in 1972 if he were to continue on his present course, the offer was seen as worth the risk, especially since the North Vietnamese rejected it. In private, Kissinger called the "standstill ceasefire" offer as the means that "at a minimum...would give us from temporary relief from public pressures". Subsequently, Kissinger has maintained that Nixon's offer of 7 October was sincere and that the North Vietnamese made a major error in rejecting it.

== Diplomatic maneuvers (1971–1972) ==
In late 1970, Nixon and Kissinger became concerned that the North Vietnamese would launch a major offensive in 1972 to coincide with presidential election, making it imperative to cut the Ho Chi Minh Trail in 1971 to prevent the Communists from building up their forces. As the Cooper–Church Amendment had forbidden U.S. troops from fighting in Laos, the plans that were conceived called for South Vietnamese troops with American air support to invade Laos to sever the Ho Chi Minh Trail in an operation code-named Lam Son 719. Kissinger wrote about Lam Son: "The operation, conceived in doubt and assailed by skepticism, proceeded in confusion". In the first major test of Vietnamization, the ARVN failed miserably. The ARVN invaded Laos on 8 February 1971 and were stopped decisively by the North Vietnamese. The majority of the ARVN officers were men who began their careers fighting for the French and retained the mentalité de colonisé, automatically deferring to any white man present be he French or American. Without the American advisers to tell them what to do, the ARVN officers tended to freeze up with fear and paralysis as had happened during Lam Son 719. By contrast, the officers of the PAVN had begun their careers fighting against the French, and were accustomed to think for themselves, which gave them the edge over the ARVN. Additionally, the U.S. Army had estimated that cutting the Ho Chi Minh Trail in Laos would require 4 U.S. Army divisions, while the ARVN, in the invasion of Laos, had only assigned 2 divisions Under the cover of air strikes flown by the U.S. Air Force and the U.S. Navy, the ARVN advanced 20 miles into Laos and finally took the ruins of the town of Tchepone, which had been heavily bombed by the Americans, but were then pinned down by intense PAVN artillery fire from the hills above, making any further advance impossible. In March, Kissinger sent his deputy Haig to inspect the situation personally, leading him to report that the ARVN officers lacked courage and did not want to fight, making retreat the only option. The retreat, when it began, turned into a rout. Kissinger wrote that Lam Son had fallen "far short of our expectations", which he blamed on bad American planning, poor South Vietnamese tactics and Nixon's leadership style, leading Karnow to write that he blamed "everyone, characteristically, except himself".

In late May 1971, Kissinger returned to Paris to fruitlessly meet again with Tho. The North Vietnamese demand that Thiệu step down proved to the main obstacle. Kissinger did not want a repeat of the prolonged bout of political instability that characterized South Vietnam from 1963 to 1967 and believed Thiệu was a force for order. Tho suggested to Kissinger that Americans "stop supporting" Thiệu who was running for reelection in a ballot scheduled for 3 October 1971. Tho claimed that Thiệu's opponents, Air Marshal Nguyễn Cao Kỳ and General Dương Văn Minh, aka "Big Minh", were both open to a coalition government with the Viet Cong, and if either man were elected president, the war would be over by late 1971. Thiệu used a legal technicality to disqualify Kỳ, while Minh dropped out when it was clear the election was rigged. In the 1971 election, the CIA donated money for Thiệu's reelection campaign, while the Americans did not pressure Thiệu to stop rigging the election. Though Kissinger did not regard South Vietnam as important in its own right, he believed it was necessary to support South Vietnam to maintain the United States as a global power, believing that none of America's allies would trust the United States if South Vietnam were abandoned too quickly. Kissinger also believed that if South Vietnam were to collapse, it would "leave deep scars on our society, feeling impulses for recrimination". As a Jew who had grown up in Nazi Germany, Kissinger was haunted by how the Dolchstoßlegende had been used by the German right to delegitimatize the Weimar Republic, and believed that something similar would happen in the United States should it lose the Vietnam War, fueling the rise of right-wing extremism.

In June 1971, Kissinger supported Nixon's effort to ban the Pentagon Papers, saying the "hemorrhage of state secrets" to the media was making diplomacy impossible. Kissinger told Nixon about the leak: "No foreign country will ever trust us again. We might just as well turn it all over to the Soviets and get it over with". Knowing Nixon's fears, Kissinger told him that if he did nothing, "it shows that you're weak, Mr. President. The fact that some idiot can publish all the diplomatic secrets of this country on his own is damaging to your image as far as the Soviets are concerned and it could destroy our ability to conduct foreign policy". Daniel Ellsberg, the man who leaked the Pentagon Papers to the New York Times, had been consulted by Kissinger for ideas about Vietnam in late 1968–early 1969, but when he leaked the papers, Kissinger told Nixon that he was a left-wing "fanatic" and a "drug abuser". Kissinger depicted Ellsberg to Nixon as a drug-crazed, sexually perverted degenerate of questionable mental stability out to ruin his administration. Reflecting his increasing frustration with the war, Nixon often talked to Kissinger in a bloodthirsty manner about a "fantasy holocaust" in which he would have U.S. forces kill every living thing in North Vietnam and then pull out, leading the latter appalled by his own account.

By early 1972, Nixon boasted that he had pulled out 400,000 U.S. soldiers from Vietnam since July 1969, and battle deaths had fallen from an average of 200 per week in 1969 down to an average of 10 per week in 1972. The policy of Vietnamization had, as Laird predicted, tamed the antiwar movement as most Americans objected not to the war in Vietnam per se, only to Americans dying in it. With the antiwar movement in decline by 1972, Nixon believed his chances of reelection were good, but Kissinger kept complaining that he was losing "negotiating assets" in his talks with Tho every time a withdrawal of American forces was announced. Likewise, Kissinger noted that the major reason why Congress, despite the antiwar feelings of many of its members, kept voting to fund the war was because of the argument that it was patriotic to support "our boys in the field"; as more Americans were pulled out, Congress was less inclined to vote to fund keeping South Vietnamese "boys in the field". However, the imperatives of being re-elected were far more important to Nixon than giving Kissinger "negotiating assets". In early 1972, Nixon publicly revealed that Kissinger had secretly been negotiating with Tho since 1970 to prove that he was really committed to peace in Vietnam, despite what the antiwar movement had been saying about him for the last three years. Reflecting Kissinger's weakening hand in his talks with Tho, by 1971–72, Nixon had increasingly come to believe that the "linkage" concept of improving relations with the Soviet Union and China in exchange for those nations cutting off the supply of weapons to North Vietnam offered his best chance of a favorable peace deal. On 6 April 1972, Tho requested Kissinger to meet him in Paris, a request that Kissinger rejected as "insolent".

== 1972 Easter Offensive ==
Kissinger, who accompanied Nixon to China, spent much time talking to the suave Chinese Premier Zhou Enlai about Vietnam, pressing him to end the supply of arms to North Vietnam. The talks went nowhere as Zhou told Kissinger that the North Vietnamese played off China against the Soviet Union, and to cut off North Vietnam would allow it to fall into the Soviet sphere of influence. As the Chinese People's Liberation Army had been badly bloodied by the Red Army in a border war in 1969, Zhou stated that to face a two-front war with Chinese forces facing North Vietnam in the south and the Soviet Union in the north was not acceptable to his government. Zhou offered Kissinger only the vague message that China supported efforts to find peace in Vietnam while refusing to make any promises, though Kissinger also noted that Zhou declined to endorse North Vietnam's demands. Despite Nixon's coming visit, in late 1971, the Chinese drastically increased their military aid to North Vietnam and continued to send a massive amount of weapons south even as Nixon and Kissinger exchanged pleasantries with Mao and Zhou in Beijing. As usual, when the Chinese increased their supply of arms to North Vietnam, the Soviet Union did likewise, as both Communist states competed with one another for influence in Hanoi by trying to be the biggest supplier of weapons. On 30 March 1972, the PAVN launched the Easter Offensive that overran several provinces in South Vietnam while pushing the ARVN to the brink of collapse. By 1 April 1972, the 3rd ARVN division was retreating south with their families. Kissinger summoned Dobrynin to the White House to accuse the Soviet Union of responsibility for the Easter Offensive, saying the North Vietnamese were fighting with Soviet-made weapons, and asked the Soviets to pressure the North Vietnamese to end the offensive.

== Nixon's visit to Moscow ==
At the time of the Easter Offensive, Kissinger was deeply involved in planning for Nixon's visit to Moscow in May 1972. The offensive brought to the fore the differences between Nixon and Kissinger. Nixon threatened to cancel his summit with Leonid Brezhnev in Moscow if the Soviet Union did not force North Vietnam to end the Easter Offensive at once, saying: "Whatever else happens, we cannot lose this war. The summit isn't worth a damn if the price for it is losing in Vietnam". Nixon, in his instructions to Kissinger, stated that he viewed the relations with the Soviet Union through the prism of the Vietnam War, and if the Soviets were not prepared to help, Kissinger "should just pack up and come home". Kissinger, for his part, believed that Nixon was massively exaggerating Soviet influence in North Vietnam and no longer believed, if he ever did, in Nixon's "linkage" concept. Kissinger feared that Nixon was obsessed with Vietnam, and damaging relations with the Soviet Union over Vietnam would destabilize the international power balance by increasing American-Soviet tensions. On 20 April 1972, Kissinger arrived in Moscow without informing the U.S. ambassador Jacob D. Beam, and then went to have tea with Brezhnev in the Kremlin. Nixon, as usual when under stress, departed for a marathon drinking session with Rebozo at Camp David, and via Haig kept sending messages to Kissinger urging him to be tough with Brezhnev. As no American president had ever visited Moscow before, Kissinger got the impression that Brezhnev wanted the planned summit to happen "at almost any cost".

Despite Nixon's orders, Kissinger was rather emollient with Brezhnev, and though Nixon's instructions stated that he was only to discuss Vietnam, he began to talk about arms control instead. Kissinger informed Brezhnev that the United States wanted all of the PAVN divisions taking part in the present offensive to return to North Vietnam at once, a "demand" that many historians argue was, in fact, a disguised concession, as Kissinger only mentioned the divisions sent south for the Easter Offensive, presumably meaning that the PAVN divisions who had arrived before the Easter Offensive could stay, thus abandoning the "mutual withdrawal formula" that Tho had rejected out of hand so many times. Kissinger, in his memoirs, called this claim "pure nonsense", but Tho, at the time, interpreted Kissinger's statement to Brezhnev in those terms. Kissinger reportedly considered his demand that the three PAVN divisions engaged in the Easter Offensive to be a "throwaway" as he did not expect North Vietnam to pull any troops out of South Vietnam.

Upon his return to Washington, Kissinger reported that Brezhnev would not cancel the summit and was keen to sign the SALT I Treaty. Kissinger went to Paris on 3 May to meet Tho with orders from Nixon that North Vietnam must "settle or else!" Nixon complained that Kissinger was "obsessed" with the need for a peace treaty while he charged that he now wished he followed his instincts to bomb North Vietnam in 1970, saying if he had done so, the war would have been over by now. On 2 May 1972, the PAVN had captured Quang Tri, an important provincial city in South Vietnam, and as a result of this victory, Tho was in no mood for a compromise. Though Kissinger in general shared Nixon's determination to be tough, he was afraid that the president would overreact and destroy the budding détente with the Soviet Union and China by striking too hard at North Vietnam. Moreover, after the rupture caused by the Cambodian incursion, Kissinger was trying hard to rebuild his relations with the liberal American intelligentsia, saying he did want to become "this administration's Walt Rostow". Kissinger's predecessor, Rostow, was once a professor at Harvard, Oxford, MIT and Cambridge, but by serving as the National Security Advisor, he had been shunned by the Ivy League universities and ended up at the lowly University of Texas, a fate that Kissinger was determined to avoid. On 5 May 1972, Nixon ordered the U.S. Air Force to start bombing Hanoi and Haiphong and on 8 May ordered the U.S. Navy to mine the coast of North Vietnam. As the bombings and mining of North Vietnam were being carried out, Nixon, and even more so Kissinger, waited anxiously for the Soviet reaction and, much to their relief, received only the standard statement decrying the American action and a diplomatic note complaining that American aircraft had bombed a Soviet freighter in Haiphong harbor. The Moscow summit was not cancelled.

== Preparation of the 1972 Paris Peace Accords ==
=== Kissinger's May 1972 Paris meeting with Tho ===
On 6 May 1972, Kissinger returned to Paris to face Tho again. Nixon had ordered Kissinger to be severe, saying, "No nonsense. No niceness. No accommodations". As a result, Kissinger was unusually unfriendly, and snapped when Tho mentioned that Senator J. William Fulbright was criticizing the Vietnam War: "Our domestic discussions are no concerns of yours". Tho told Kissinger: "I'm giving an example to prove that Americans share our views", and then stated that the United States had never followed the Geneva Accords. Tho charged that the American terms calling for a withdrawal from Vietnam months after a peace agreement was signed was unacceptable. Kissinger promised that once a peace agreement was signed, a general election would be called to elect a new South Vietnamese president, Thieu would resign, and that the Communists could take in the election. When Kissinger asked when Thieu should resign, Thuy told him, "Tomorrow is best". Kissinger replied: "All other members, except Thieu can remain in the administration, can't they?" Thuy stated that they could, but there had to be release of political prisoners and freedom of the press, leading Kissinger to ask: "Can anybody publish a newspaper in North Vietnam? I ask for my own education". On 19 July 1972, Kissinger again met Tho in Paris. Kissinger tried to persuade Thọ that he had nothing to fear from the United States in the long term, and asked: "when we can live with governments that are not pro-American in the largest Asian nations, why should we insist on a government that is pro-American in Saigon?" Tho charged that Kissinger was bringing nothing new.

=== Congress calls for total withdrawal ===
On 24 July 1972, Congress passed an act calling for the total withdrawal of all American forces from Vietnam once all of the American POWs in North Vietnam were released, causing Kissinger to say that the North Vietnamese only had to wait until "Congress voted us out of the war". However, the sight of Nixon and Kissinger posing for photographs with Brezhnev and Mao deeply worried the North Vietnamese, who were afraid of being "sold out" by either China or the Soviet Union, causing some flexibility in their negotiating tactics. The Eastern Offensive had not caused the collapse of the South Vietnamese government, but it increased the amount of territory under Communist control. The North Vietnamese were moving towards taking up the "standstill ceasefire" offer and ordered the Viet Cong to seize as much territory as possible in preparation for a "leopard's spot" ceasefire (so called because the patchwork of territories controlled by the Viet Cong and the Saigon government resembled the spots on a leopard's fur). On 1 August 1972, Kissinger met Tho again in Paris, and for the first time, he seemed willing to compromise, saying that the political and military terms of an armistice could be treated separately and hinted that his government was no longer willing to make the overthrow of Thiệu a precondition. Kissinger, for his part, seemed keen to make a deal before the elections, saying that if an agreement was signed by 1 September, all American forces would be out of Vietnam by the end of 1972. Tho demanded $8 billion in reparations for war damages, a demand that Kissinger rejected.

=== Nixon begins spying on Kissinger ===
By this time, Kissinger's deputy, Alexander Haig, was spying on him on behalf of Nixon. While Kissinger remained optimistic about peace in Vietnam, Haig was pessimistic. Nixon wrote on the margin of a note from Haig: "Al-it is obvious that no progress has been made and that none can be expected". On 23 August 1972, Kissinger flew to Saigon to meet Thieu and oversee the withdrawal of the last U.S. combat troops from South Vietnam. Thieu was distrustful of Kissinger and pressed him to maintain the "mutual withdrawal formula". Kissinger did not tell him that he was on the verge of disregarding it. On 15 September 1972, Kissinger at another meeting in Paris told Tho: "We wish to end before October 15—if sooner, all the better". Haig visited Saigon to 4 October 1972 to see Thieu, who spent four hours ranting against Kissinger, accusing him of wanting to betray South Vietnam. Haig sent the transcript of the conversation straight to Nixon. Nixon's chief of staff, H.R. Haldeman, wrote in his diary that Kissinger and Haig were making completely opposite conclusions, but went on to note: "Unlike '68 when Thieu screwed Johnson, he had Nixon as an alterative. Now he has McGovern as an alternative, which would be a disaster for him, even worse than the worse possible thing that Nixon could do to him". In early October, Nixon demanded that Haig had to be present at all of Kissinger's meetings with Tho, as he no longer trusted him.

=== Breakthrough in talks ===
On the evening of 8 October 1972, at a secret meeting of Kissinger and Tho in a house in the Paris suburb of Gif-sur-Yvette once owned by the painter Fernand Léger, the decisive breakthrough in the talks came. Tho believed that Kissinger was, as he later put it, "in a rush" for a peace deal before the presidential election, and began with what he called "a very realistic and very simple proposal" for a ceasefire that would see the Americans pull all their forces out of Vietnam in exchange for the release of all the POWs in North Vietnam. As for the ultimate fate of South Vietnam, Tho proposed the creation of a "council of national reconciliation" that would govern the nation, but in the meantime, Thiệu could stay in power until the council was formed, while a "leopard's spot" ceasefire would come into effect with the Viet Cong and the Saigon government controlling whatever territories they were had at the time of the ceasefire. The "mutual withdrawal formula" was to be disregarded, with PAVN forces to stay in South Vietnam, with Tho giving Kissinger a vague promise that no more supplies would be sent down the Ho Chi Minh Trail. Kissinger accepted Tho's offer as the best deal possible, saying that the "mutual withdrawal formula" had to be abandoned, as it had been "unobtainable through ten years of war...We could not make it a condition for a final settlement. We had long passed that threshold". Several of Kissinger's own staff, most notably John Negroponte, were strongly opposed to him accepting this offer, saying Kissinger had given away more than he had obtained. In response to Negronponte's objections, Kissinger exploded in rage, accusing him of "nit-picking" and screamed at the top of his voice: "You don't understand. I want to meet their terms. I want to reach an agreement. I want to end this war before the election. It can be done and it will be done. What do you want us to do? Stay there forever?" Kissinger told Tho that he would go to Washington and Saigon to get the approval of Nixon and Thieu, and he expected the agreement to be signed on either 25 October or 26 October. On 12 October, Kissinger told Nixon: "Well, you've got three for three, Mr. President"—meaning trips to China and the Soviet Union plus a peace agreement for Vietnam. Even the fact that under the peace agreement, the United States was to pay reparations to North Vietnam in the form of economic aid was seen as a benefit by Nixon, who commented that this would be a way of forcing the Vietnamese Communists to admit to the economic failures of their system.

=== Failure of talks ===
Reflecting the "leopard's spot" ceasefire, Kissinger sent Thiệu a message saying he should "seize as much territory as possible" before the ceasefire came into effect, while the United States launched Operation Enhance Plus to give South Vietnam as many weapons as possible. Over the course of six weeks in the fall of 1972, South Vietnam ended up with the world's fourth largest air force, as the Americans provided as many war planes as they possibly could. However, neither Kissinger nor Nixon appreciated that for Thiệu, who saw the draft peace agreement that Kissinger signed in Paris on 18 October 1972 as a betrayal, any sort of peace deal calling for withdrawal of American forces was unacceptable. Kissinger had kept the South Vietnamese in the dark about the peace deal, but the North Vietnamese had shared everything with the Viet Cong. Kissinger had sent Thieu an earlier version of the peace agreement that was less accommodating to him, hoping that when he saw the final agreement, he would approve. However, the ARVN had captured a 10-page summary of the peace agreement from a Viet Cong command post, and Thieu knew what the actual agreement was.

On 21 October, Kissinger, together with the American ambassador Ellsworth Bunker, arrived at the Gia Long Palace in Saigon to show Thiệu the peace agreement. The meeting went extremely badly, with Thiệu enraged that Kissinger did not take the time to translate the draft peace treaty into Vietnamese, bringing with him only an English language copy. The meeting went from bad to worse, with Thiệu having a meltdown as he broke down in tears and hysterically accused Kissinger of plotting with the Soviet Union and China to betray him, saying he could never accept this peace agreement. Kissinger's statement that "Had we wanted to see you out, there would have been many easier ways by which we could have accomplished this" did not improve the mood. Thiệu later stated that he wanted to punch Kissinger in the face at that meeting. Thiệu refused to sign the peace agreement and demanded very extensive amendments that, as Kissinger reported to Nixon, "verge on insanity". Nixon ordered Kissinger to "push Thiệu as far as possible", but Thiệu refused to sign the peace agreement. Thiệu refused to see Kissinger the next day. Kissinger told one of Thieu's aides, Hoang Duc Nha, on the phone: "I am the special envoy of the President of the United States of America. You know I cannot be treated as an errand boy". Nha replied: "We never considered you an errand boy, but if that's what you think you are, there's nothing I can do about it". As Kissinger returned to Washington, one of his aides recalled: "In twenty-four hours, the bottom fell out".

Though Nixon had initially supported Kissinger against Thiệu, two of his most influential advisers, namely his chief of staff, H.R. Haldeman and the Domestic Affairs Adviser John Ehrlichman, urged him to reconsider, arguing that Kissinger had given away too much and that Thiệu's objections had merit. As Thiệu sensed Nixon's changing mood, on 24 October 1972, he called a press conference to denounce the draft agreement as a betrayal and stated that the Viet Cong "must be wiped out quickly and mercilessly". On 25 October 1972, Kissinger held a meeting with the journalist Max Frankel of the New York Times to predict that a peace agreement would occur in the next few days unless either North Vietnam or South Vietnam committed "a supreme act of folly". On October 26, North Vietnam published the draft agreement and accused the United States of trying to "sabotage" it by backing Thiệu. On the same day, Kissinger, who until then had never spoken to the media as National Security Advisor, called a press conference at the White House to say: "We believe peace is at hand. We believe an agreement is within sight". Kissinger later admitted that this statement was a major mistake, as it inflated hopes for peace while enraging Nixon who saw it as weakness. Nixon came very close to disavowing Kissinger, as he declared the draft peace agreement had "differences that must be resolved". Taking up Thiệu's cause as his own, Nixon wanted 69 amendments to the draft peace agreement to be included in the final treaty and ordered Kissinger back to Paris to force Tho to accept them. Kissinger regarded Nixon's 69 amendments as "preposterous," as he knew Tho would never accept them. By this point, Kissinger's relations with Nixon were tense, while Nixon's "German shepherds" Haldeman and Ehrlichman intrigued against him.

== Christmas Bombings and Paris Peace Accords (1972–1973) ==
=== November 1972 meeting with Tho ===
On 20 November 1972, Kissinger met Tho again in Paris. Kissinger no longer aimed at secrecy and was followed by paparazzi as he went to a house owned by the French Communist Party, where Tho was waiting for him. Kissinger announced that the Americans wanted major changes to the peace agreement made in October to accommodate Thieu, which led Tho to accuse him of negotiating in bad faith. Tho stated: "We have been deceived by the French, the Japanese and the Americans. But the deception has never been so flagrant as of now". Kissinger insisted the changes he wanted were only minor, but in effect, he wanted to renegotiate almost the entire agreement. Kissinger wanted to eliminate all of the powers assigned to the National Reconciliation Council and for the National Liberation Front's Provisional Revolutionary Government to be prevented from signing the peace accords. Tho rejected Kissinger's terms, saying he would abide by the terms agreed to on 8 October. Putting more pressure on him, Nixon told Kissinger to break off the talks if Tho would not agree to the changes he wanted. Being re-elected for a second term meant that Nixon was no longer concerned about public opinion as before, and in November 1972, he seriously considered firing Kissinger. Though Nixon decided that Thieu's 69 amendments were unrealistic, he also wanted a demonstration of force to prove that he was still willing to stand by South Vietnam. Kissinger told Nixon: "While we have a moral case for bombing North Vietnam when it does not accept our terms, it seems to be really stretching the point to bomb North Vietnam when it has accepted our terms and when South Vietnam has not".

As expected, Tho refused to consider any of the 69 amendments, and on 13 December 1972, he left Paris for Hanoi after accusing the Americans of negotiating in bad faith. Kissinger, by this stage, was worked up into a state of fury after Tho walked out of the Paris talks and told Nixon: "They're just a bunch of shits. Tawdry, filthy shits. They make the Russians look good, compared to the way the Russians make the Chinese look good when it comes to negotiating in a responsible and decent way". The National Security Advisor now advised Nixon to bomb North Vietnam to make them "talk seriously".

=== Christmas bombings ===
On 14 December 1972, Nixon sent an ultimatum demanding that Tho return to Paris to "negotiate seriously" within 72 hours or else he would bomb North Vietnam without limit. Knowing that Nixon was considering sacking him, Kissinger approved of his decision to resume bombing North Vietnam. Kissinger told the media that while the peace agreement was "99 percent completed…we will not be blackmailed into an agreement. We will not be stampeded into an agreement and, if I may say so, we will not be charmed into an agreement until its conditions are right". At the same time, Nixon ordered Admiral Thomas Hinman Moorer, the Chairman of the Joint Chiefs of Staff: "I don't want any more of this crap about the fact that we couldn't hit this target or that one. This is your chance to use military power to win this war, and if you don't, I'll hold you responsible". Following the rejection of Nixon's ultimatum, on 18 December, Operation Linebacker II was launched, the so-called Christmas Bombings that lasted until 29 December 1972. During these 11 days of bombing that were the heaviest bombing of the entire war, B-52 bombers flew 3,000 sorties and dropped 40,000 tons of bombs on Hanoi and Haiphong. About 1,261 people were killed in Hanoi and another 305 in Haiphong, as the North Vietnamese authorities had pulled out most people from the two cities beforehand to escape the expected bombings.

=== Final meeting with Tho ===
At the time of the Christmas bombings, a columnist for the New York Times, Scotty Reston, stated that, based on unnamed sources, Kissinger was opposed to the Christmas bombings and was planning to write a book that "would probably be highly embarrassing to Mr. Nixon" if he were fired. Nixon accused Kissinger of talking to Reston, which he denied, until he was caught out when the White House phone log showed that he called Reston several times just before his column ran. On 26 December 1972, in a press statement, Hanoi indicated a willingness to resume the Paris peace talks, provided that the bombing stop. On 8 January 1973, Kissinger and Tho met again in Paris and reached an agreement the next day, which, in its main points, was essentially the same as the one Nixon had rejected in October with only cosmetic concessions to the Americans. At his meeting with Tho on 8 January 1973 in a house in the French town of Gif-sur-Yvette, Kissinger arrived to find nobody at the door to greet him. When Kissinger entered the conference room, nobody spoke to him. Sensing the hostile mood, Kissinger, speaking in French, said: "It was not my fault about the bombing". Before Kissinger could say anymore, Tho exploded in rage, saying in French: "Under the pretext of interrupted negotiations, you resumed the bombing of North Vietnam, just at the moment when I reached home. You have 'greeted' my arrival in a very courteous manner! Your action, I can say, is flagrant and gross! You and no one else strained the honor of the United States". Tho shouted at Kissinger for over an hour, and despite Kissinger's requests not to speak so loudly because the reporters outside the room could hear what he was saying, he did not relent. Tho concluded: "For more than ten years, America has used violence to beat down the Vietnamese people-napalm, B-52s. But you don't draw any lessons from your failures. You continue the same policy. Ngu xuan! Ngu xuan! Ngu xuan!". When Kissinger asked what ngu xuan meant in Vietnamese, the translator refused to translate, as ngu xuan roughly meant that a person is grossly stupid.

When Kissinger was finally able to speak, he argued that it was Tho who, by being unreasonable, had forced Nixon to order the Christmas bombings, a claim that led Tho to snap in fury: "You've spent billions of dollars and many tons of bombs when we had a text ready to sign". Kissinger replied: "I have heard many adjectives in your comments. I propose that you should not use them". Tho answered: "I have used those adjectives with a great deal of restraint already. World opinion, the U.S. press and U.S. political personalities have used harsher words". After the tirade, negotiations proceeded well. Kissinger inserted a vaguely written paragraph calling for the withdrawal of all foreign forces from South Vietnam, which Tho accepted while at the same time saying the PAVN forces were not foreign. On the night of 9 January 1973, Kissinger phoned Nixon in Washington to say that a peace agreement would be signed very soon. On 10 January 1973, negotiations broke down when Kissinger demanded the release of all American POWs in North Vietnam once a peace agreement was signed, but offered no guarantees about Viet Cong prisoners being held in South Vietnam. Tho stated: "I cannot accept your proposal. I completely reject it". Tho wanted the release of all prisoners once a peace agreement was signed, which led Kissinger to say this was an unreasonable demand. Tho, who had been tortured as a young man by the French colonial police for advocating Vietnamese independence, shouted: "You have never been a prisoner. You don't understand suffering. It's unfair". Kissinger finally offered the concession that the United States would use "maximum influence" to pressure the South Vietnamese government to release all Viet Cong prisoners within sixty days of a peace agreement being signed.

Thiệu once again rejected the peace agreement, only to receive an ultimatum from Nixon: "You must decide now whether you desire to continue our alliance or whether you want me to seek a settlement with the enemy which serves U.S. interests alone". Nixon told Kissinger: "Brutality is nothing. You have never seen it if this son-of-a-bitch doesn't go along, believe me". Nixon's threat served its purpose, and Thiệu reluctantly accepted the peace agreement. On 23 January 1973, at 12:45 pm, Kissinger and Tho signed a peace agreement in Paris that called for the complete withdrawal of all U.S. forces from Vietnam by March in exchange for North Vietnam freeing all the U.S. POWs. During the three years spanning from 1969 to 1972, a total of 20,533 Americans had been killed in Vietnam, together with about 107,000 ARVN soldiers, and, as the American historian A.J. Langguth noted: "...perhaps five time that number of North Vietnamese and Vietcong troops. Civilian casualties were impossible to estimate. They may have run to a million men, women and children".

=== Spring 1973 strategic situation ===
In February 1973, as the Khmer Rouge continued to win victories against the Lon Nol regime, American bombing of Cambodia was increased. On 15 March 1973, Nixon had implied during a speech that the United States might go back into Vietnam should the Communists violate the ceasefire, and, as a result, Congress began debating a bill to limit American funding for military operations in Southeast Asia. On 29 March 1973, the withdrawal of the Americans from Vietnam was complete, and on 1 April 1973, the last American POWs were freed. The peace agreement put into effect the "leopard's spot" ceasefire, with the Viet Cong being allowed to rule whatever parts of South Vietnam they held at the time of the ceasefire and all of the North Vietnamese troops in South Vietnam being allowed to stay, putting the Communists in a strong position to eventually take over South Vietnam. Public opinion polls in 1973 showed that 52% of Americans were opposed to military aid to South Vietnam if North Vietnam should violate the Paris peace accords and 71% were against the return of American troops to Vietnam.

In April 1973, the CIA estimated the total number of PAVN troops in South Vietnam at 150,000 (about the same as in 1972), whereas Kissinger accused North Vietnam of moving more troops down the Ho Chi Minh Trail. That month, Kissinger met with Tho in Paris to reaffirm their commitment to the Paris peace agreement and to pressure him to stop the Khmer Rouge from overrunning Cambodia. Tho told Kissinger that the Khmer Rouge's leader, Pol Pot, was a Vietnamphobe and that North Vietnam had very limited influence over him. At the same time, Kissinger reported to Nixon that "only a miracle" could save South Vietnam now, as Thiệu showed no signs of making the necessary reforms to allow the ARVN to fight. His assessment of Cambodia was even bleaker, as the Lon Nol regime had lost control of much of the countryside by the spring of 1973, and only American air strikes prevented the Khmer Rouge from taking Phnom Penh. Between March–May 1973, American bombers dropped 95,000 tons of bombs on Cambodia, while American fighters dropped another 15,000 tons of bombs. On 4 June 1973, the Senate passed a bill that already cleared the House of Representatives to block funding for any American military operations in Indochina, and Kissinger spent much of the summer of 1973 lobbying Congress to extend the deadline to 15 August in order to keep bombing Cambodia. The Lon Nol regime was saved in 1973 due to heavy American bombing, but the cutoff in funding ended the possibility of an American return to Southeast Asia.

The PAVN had taken heavy losses in the Easter Offensive, but the North Vietnamese were rebuilding their strength for a new offensive. By the spring of 1973, Nixon was caught up in the Watergate scandal and was losing interest in foreign affairs. Kissinger was angry that the Secretary of State, William Rogers, had not resigned so he take could over the State Department, shouting: "And now's he's hanging on just as I said he would. Piece by piece. Bit by bit. He stays on and on and on! He will be with me forever-because he has this President wrapped around his little finger". Not until August 1973 did Nixon inform Kissinger that he was sacking Rogers and appointing him as his successor. Thiệu's government was still receiving massive amounts of military aid, and his regime controlled 75% of South Vietnam's territory and 85% of the population at the time of the ceasefire but Thiệu's unwillingness to crackdown on corruption and end the system under which ARVN officers were promoted for political loyalty instead of military merit were structural weaknesses that spelled long-term problems for his regime. South Vietnam's economy had been heavily dependent upon the hundreds of millions of dollars brought in by the U.S. military, and the withdrawal of American forces threw the economy into recession. Even more damaging was the Arab oil shock of 1973–74, which destabilized South Vietnam's economy, and by the summer of 1974, 90% of the ARVN's soldiers were not receiving enough pay to support themselves and their families.

== End of South Vietnam (1973–1975) ==
Along with North Vietnamese Politburo Member Le Duc Tho, Kissinger was awarded the Nobel Peace Prize on 10 December 1973 for their work in negotiating the ceasefires contained in the Paris Peace Accords on "Ending the War and Restoring Peace in Vietnam", which were signed the previous January. According to Irwin Abrams, this prize was the most controversial to date. For the first time in the history of the Peace Prize, two members resigned from the Nobel Committee in protest. Tho rejected the award, telling Kissinger that peace had not been restored in South Vietnam. Kissinger wrote to the Nobel Committee that he accepted the award "with humility", and "donated the entire proceeds to the children of American servicemembers killed or missing in action in Indochina". After the Fall of Saigon in 1975, Kissinger attempted to return the award.

== Final days of the Vietnam War ==
=== Nixon's resignation ===
On 9 August 1974, Nixon resigned in the wake of the Watergate scandal. Vice President Gerald Ford assumed the presidency. Ford kept Kissinger on as both National Security Advisor and Secretary of State. Around the same time, the South Vietnamese economy, under the weight of inflation caused by the Arab oil shock and rampant corruption, collapsed. By the summer of 1974, the U.S. embassy reported that morale in the ARVN had fallen to dangerously low levels and it was uncertain how much longer South Vietnam would last. The South Vietnamese regime had lost popular support, with widespread protests against corruption breaking out; protestors accused Thiệu and his family of corruption. In August 1974, Congress passed a bill limiting American aid to South Vietnam to $700 million annually. By November 1974, fearing the worst for South Vietnam as the ARVN continued to retreat, Kissinger, during the Vladivostok Summit, lobbied Brezhnev to end Soviet military aid to North Vietnam. The same month, during a visit to Beijing, he lobbied Mao and Zhou to do the same.

=== Final offensives, Kissinger's appeals to congress ===
On 1 March 1975, the PAVN launched a major offensive that saw them quickly overrunning the Central Highlands; by 25 March, Hue had fallen. Thiệu was slow to withdraw his divisions, and by 30 March, when Da Nang fell, the ARVN's best divisions were lost, leaving the road to Saigon wide open. It was imperative for the North Vietnamese to take Saigon before the monsoons began in May, leading to a rapid march on the city. Kissinger resisted pressure from the Joint Chiefs of Staff and the Defense Secretary, James Schlesinger, to immediately withdraw American civilians from South Vietnam, arguing it would damage South Vietnamese morale. Despite this position, Kissinger advised President Ford not to have the U.S.A.F. bomb the advancing PAVN forces, saying, "If you do that, the American people will take to the streets again". He expressed little sympathy with South Vietnam, saying: "Why don't those people die faster? The worse thing that could happen would be for them to linger on".

On 15 April 1975, with the PAVN rapidly advancing, Kissinger testified before the Senate Appropriations Committee, urging Congress to increase military aid to South Vietnam by another $700 million, which was refused. Kissinger maintained at the time, and continued to maintain until his death, that if Congress had approved this request, South Vietnam would have been saved. In opposition, Karnow argued that by this point, South Vietnam was too far gone, the ARVN's morale had collapsed and it was very doubtful that anything short of sending U.S. troops back in could have saved South Vietnam. On 17 April 1975, the Lon Nol regime collapsed, and the Khmer Rouge took Phnom Penh. On 20 April, Kissinger instructed Graham Martin, U.S. ambassador in Saigon, to start preparing to evacuate all Americans from the country. Kissinger further instructed Martin that no South Vietnamese were to be included in the pull out. Martin complained to Kissinger that the "only ass which isn't covered is mine", Kissinger assured him: "When this thing is finally over, I'll be hanging several yards higher than you". On 29 April, Option IV, the largest helicopter evacuation in history, began as 70 Marine helicopters flew 8,000 people from the American embassy to the fleet offshore. Later in the day, Kissinger ordered Martin to blow up the satellite terminal at the embassy, saying, "I want you heroes home". At 7:53 am, the last Marine helicopter departed from the embassy in Saigon, marking the end of the American presence in Vietnam. On 30 April 1975, Saigon fell to the PAVN, and the war in Vietnam finally ended.
