= Eugène Jost =

Swiss architect

Eugène Jost (18 September 1865 – 24 January 1946) was a Swiss architect of the Belle Époque.

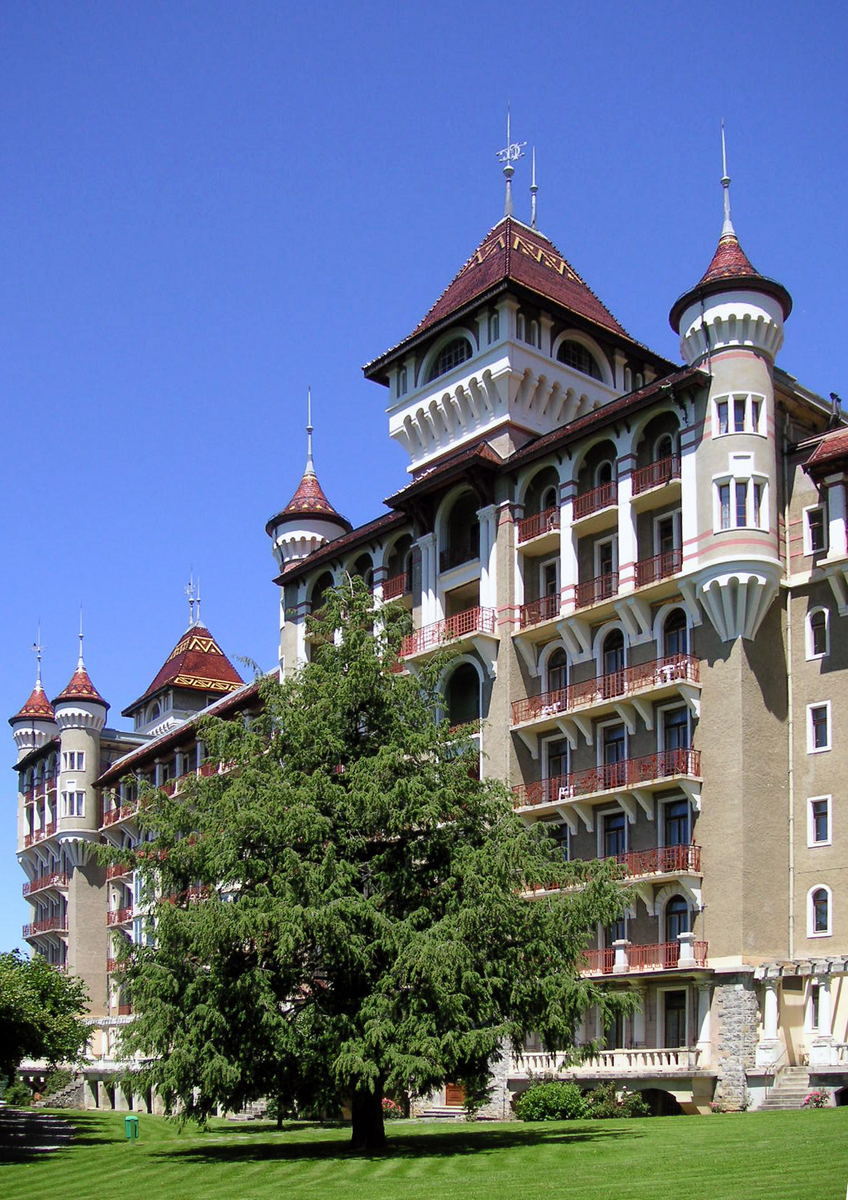
Façade of the Caux-Palace (1900-1902)

== Life ==
Eugène Jost was born on 18 September 1865 in Corsier-sur-Vevey. He initially studied at the industrial school in Corsier before moving to Paris, where he studied architecture at the école nationale supérieure des beaux-arts between 1884 and 1891 under Louis-Jules André then Victor Laloux. He won several prizes, medals and internal competitions and then returned to Switzerland, specializing in hotels.

He set up his practice in Montreux, a wealthy tourist spot. In twenty years he built nearly fifty buildings, mostly long-lasting and large. In 1904 he moved to Lausanne in the wake of several projects (hôtel des Postes on Saint-François, restoration of château Saint-Maire and design for a room at the Grand Conseil vaudois). He won first prize in the national competition for the Hôtel des Postes in Bern and second prize for that in Zürich and also created commemorative monuments to William Tell, Alexandre Vinet and Major Davel. His pace of work was slowed by the First World War and he retired for good in 1931.

He died on 24 January 1946 in Lausanne.

== Bibliography ==
- Isabelle Rucki, Dorothee Huber, Architektenlexikon der Schweiz 19./20. Jahrhundert, Bâle, Boston, Berlin 1998, pp. 300–301.
- (in French) Dave Lüthi (ed), Eugène Jost : architecte du passé retrouvé, Lausanne Presses polytechniques et universitaires romandes (Les archives de la construction moderne No. 8), 2001.
- (in French) Dave Lüthi, Pour une Cité pittoresque : quatre projets de l'architecte Eugène Jost (1894-1899), in Mémoire vive, pages d'histoire lausannoises, No. 10, p. 18-23, 2001.
- (in German) Roland Flückiger-Seiler, Hotelträume : zwischen Gletschern und Palmen, Schweizer Tourismus und Hotelbau, 1830-1920, Baden : Hier + Jetzt Verlag für Kultur und Geschichte, 2005.

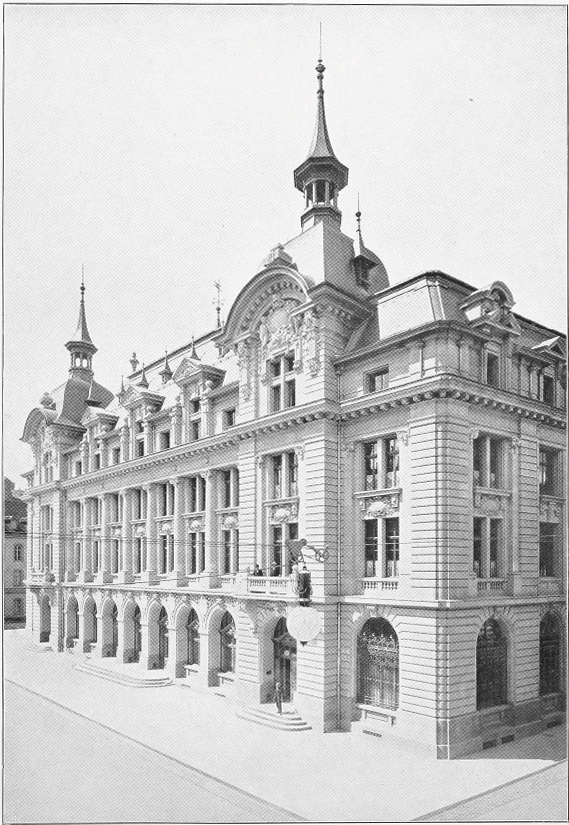
Bern, hôtel des postes by Jost and Baumgart

- (in French) Eugène Jost, architecte: 1865-1946 in: A suivre (Bulletin de la Section vaudoise de Patrimoine suisse) n° 56 et 57 (janvier-mai 2012).

== Sources ==
- (in French) Patrie suisse, 1906, no 340, p. 326.
- (in French) "Eugène Jost, architecte", in Bulletin technique de la Suisse romande, 1946, p. 108
- « Eugène Jost », sur base de données du centenaire du palais de Rumine de la Bibliothèque cantonale et universitaire de Lausanne.
- Dagmar Böcker, « Eugène Jost » dans le Dictionnaire historique de la Suisse en ligne..
- (in German) Rucki-Huber, Architektenlexikon, pp. 300–301.
- (in French) Eugène Jost, architecte du passé retrouvé, cat. expo. Lausanne, 2001 Le Temps 26 juin 2001 p. 40.
- (in French) Dave Lüthi, Matthieu Jaccard Eugène Jost 1865-1946, travels in Lausanne and Montreux, Lausanne, 2001.
- Château Saint-Maire : Le projet Jost
