= French Switzerland Championships =

French Switzerland Championships Championnats de Suisse romande

Defunct tennis tournament
- Tour: ILTF Circuit (1913-46)
- Founded: 1905; 120 years ago
- Abolished: 1946; 79 years ago
- Location: Montreux, Switzerland
- Venue: Le Montreux Palace Lawn Tennis Club; Montreux Lawn Tennis Club
- Surface: Clay (outdoors)

The French Switzerland Championships or Championnats de Suisse romande was a men's and women's open international clay court tennis tournament founded in 1905. It was first staged at the Le Montreux Palace Lawn Tennis Club, Le Montreux Palace Hotel, Montreux, Switzerland. The championships ran until 1946.

== History ==
The French Switzerland Championships were established in September 1905 and first played at the Tennis Club du Montreux Palace. In 1908 the event was moved to the Tennis Club de Montreux. During World War I the tournament was only held two times, then resuming fully in 1920. During World War II it was not held from 1939 to 1941, but resumed thereafter. Hosting of this event was shared between both venues, but the majority of time was played at the Montreux Lawn Tennis Club. The championships were discontinued in 1948.

Former winners of the men's singles title included; Robert Wallet, Roy Allen, Max Decugis, Anthony Wilding, Norman Brookes, Uberto De Morpurgo, Otto Froitzheim, Henry Mayes, Giorgio de Stefani, Hector Fisher, Gottfried von Cramm, Boris Maneff, Pierre Pellizza and Gianni Cucelli. Previous winners of the women's singles championship included; Aurea Farrington Edgington, Germaine Régnier Golding, Cilly Aussem, Ilse Friedleben, Lolette Payot, Hilde Krahwinkel, Alice Weiwers and Annelies Ullstein Bossi.

== Tournament names ==
The tournament sometimes carried the title of the Montreux Palace Hotel Autumn Championships or Montreux Autumn Meeting.

== Venues ==
The event was first held at the Le Montreux Palace Hotel in 1907 the following year in 1908 it was held at the Montreux Lawn Tennis Club founded in 1890, in the grounds of the Hôtel des Alpes-Grand Hôtel, Territet both venues held the event at various times.

== Past finals ==
=== Men's singles ===
Year	Champion	Runner-up	Score
1905	(France) Robert Wallet	(Switzerland) Pierre Gautier	6-2, 6-1, 6-3
1907	(United Kingdom) Roy Allen	(United States) R. Norris Williams	6-2, 6-0, 6-1
1908	(Austria-Hungary) Curt von Wessely	(United States) R. Norris Williams	6-4, 9-7, 6-1
1909	(France) Robert Wallet	(United States) R. Norris Williams	4-6, 6-1, 1-6, 7-5, 7-5
1910	(West Germany) Heinrich Kleinschroth	(United States) R. Norris Williams	9-7, 7-5, 6-8, 6-8, 6-1
1911	(United States) R. Norris Williams	(Austria) Ludwig von Salm-Hoogstraeten	8-6, 11-9 rtd.
1912	(France) Max Decugis	(France) André Chancerei	6-4, 6-2, 6-1
1913	(New Zealand) Anthony Wilding	(West Germany) Robert Kleinschroth	6-1, 6-4, 6-2
1914	(Australia) Norman Brookes	(West Germany) Ferdinand Uhi	6-1, 6-2, 6-4
1915	(United Kingdom) Mr. Marcel	(Switzerland) E. Lombroso	6-4, 6-0, 6-2
1916	(Republic of Ireland) Charles Henry Martin	(Switzerland) Louis Ammann	6-0, 6-3, 6-4
1917-21	No competition		
1922	(France) Jean Couiteas de Faucamberge	(Greece) Augustos Zerlendis	6-2, 3-6, 8-6, 6-4
1924	(Italy) Uberto de Morpurgo	(Socialist Federal Republic of Yugoslavia) Đorđe Dunđerski	6-0, 6-4, 6-3
1925	(West Germany) Otto Froitzheim	(West Germany) Oscar Kreuzer	6-3, 6-3, 3-0 rtd.
1927	(Canada) Henry Mayes	(Italy) Uberto de Morpurgo	4-6, 3-6, 10-8, 7-5, 6-2
1928	(Denmark) Axel Petersen	(Japan) Tamino Abe	6-2, 6-3, 3-6, 4-6, 6-2
1929	(Italy) Giorgio de Stefani	(Switzerland) Hector Fisher	6-3, 6-2, 6-1
1930	(France) Emmanuel du Plaix	(Switzerland) Charles Aeschlimann	6-2, 6-1, 6-0
1932	(Switzerland) Hector Fisher	(West Germany) Daniel Prenn	6-1, 6-2, 4-6, 6-2
1933	(Germany) Gottfried von Cramm	(Italy) Giorgio de Stefani	6-4, 6-3, 0-6, 6-3
1934	(Austria) Herbert Kinzl	(Switzerland) Boris Maneff	6-1, 10-8, 3-6, 6-3
1935	(Switzerland) Boris Maneff	(Switzerland) Max Ellmer	1-6, 6-1, 6-1, 6-4
1936	(Italy) Giorgio de Stefani	(Switzerland) Boris Maneff	6-4, 4-6, 6-2, 6-8, 6-1
1937	(Switzerland) Boris Maneff	(Poland) Ernest Wittman	9-7, 6-1
1938	(France) André Merlin	(France) Jacques Sanglier	8-10, 6-4, 6-2
1940-41	No competition		
1942	(Switzerland) Jost Spitzer	(France) André Jacquemet	6-3, 6-4, 6-4
1943	(Switzerland) Jost Spitzer	(Switzerland) René Buser	6-3, 6-2, 6-1
1944	(Switzerland) Boris Maneff	(Switzerland) Paul Blondel	6-1, 6-0, 6-1
1945	(France) Pierre Pellizza	(Switzerland) René Buser	6-3, 6-1, 4-6, 7-5
1946	(Italy) Giovanni Cucelli	(Italy) Marcello del Bello	6-2, 9-7, 6-4

== See also ==
- Category:National and multi-national tennis tournaments
