= Chollet =

Chollet or de Chollet is a French-language surname. Notable people with the name include:

- Aidan Chollet (born 2004), French snowboarder
- Derek Chollet (born 1970), American diplomat
- François Chollet (born 1989), French software engineer and artificial intelligence researcher
- Jean Chollet (1936–2026), French scenographer and journalist
- Jean-Baptiste Chollet (1798–1892), French musician and singer
- Jonas Chollet (born 2008), French snowboarder
- Leroy Chollet (1924–1998), American basketball player
- Marcel de Chollet (1855–1924), French-Swiss painter
- Maribel Chollet (born 1971), Mexican politician
