= Maribel =

Maribel is a Spanish language name, formed as a contraction of María Isabel. Alternately, it is an English compound name, a combined version of Mary and Belle. Spelling variants include Maribell, Maribelle, Marybel, Marybell, Mary Belle, and Marybelle.

== People with the name ==
People with the name Maribel or Maribelle include:

=== Maribel ===
- Maribel Aber (born 1973), American journalist
- Maribel Alva Olvera (born 1963), Mexican politician
- Maribel Aguirre (born 1999), Argentine racing cyclist
- Maribel Arana (born 1985), Guatemalan actress, model and beauty pageant titleholder
- Maribel Arrieta (born María Isabel Arrieta Gálvez; 1934-1989), Salvadoran television host, model and beauty pageant titleholder
- Maribel Blanco (born 1969), Spanish triathlete
- Maribel Caicedo (born 1998), Ecuadorian track and field athlete
- Maribel Díaz Cabello (born 1970), Peruvian educator, teacher, academic administrator, and former First Lady of Peru
- Maribel Chollet (born 1971), American politician
- Maribel Domínguez (born 1978), Mexican footballer
- Maribel Durruty (born 1964), Cuban long-distance runner
- Maribel Espinoza (born 1959), Honduran lawyer and politician
- Maribel Fernández (born 1953), Mexican television and film actress
- Maribel Flores (born 2005), American born Mexican soccer player
- Maribel Gonçalves (born 1978), Portuguese Olympic racewalker
- Maribel Guardia, actress born in Costa Rica and living in Mexico
- Maribel Martín de la Iglesia (born 1971), Spanish ski mountaineer
- Maribel Martín (born María Isabel Martín Martínez in 1954), Spanish actress
- Maribel Owen (1940-1961), American Olympic pairs skater, daughter of Maribel Vinson
- Maribel Parra de Mestre (born 1965), Venezuelan naval officer and oil company executive
- Maribel Perez Wadsworth, American newspaper publisher
- Maribel Pineda, Venezuelan Olympic sport shooter
- Maribel Riera (born 1980), Venezuelan softball player
- Maribel Rios, Puerto Rican neuroscientist
- Maribel Rodríguez, Puerto Rican politician
- Maribel Romero (born 1967), Spanish academic
- Maribel Solis, Dominican Olympic synchronized swimmer
- Maribel Verdú (born María Isabel Verdú Rollán in 1970), Spanish actress
- Maribel Vinson (1911-1961), American Olympic figure skater and coach and mother of skating champions Maribel Owen and Laurence Owen
- Maribel Zurita (born 1979), American boxer
- Mother Maribel of Wantage (1887-1970), Anglican nun and artist

=== Maribelle ===
- Maribelle (Marie Kwakman, born 1960), Dutch singer
- Maribelle Cormack (1902–1984), American museum director, planetarium director, and author

== Fictional characters ==
- Maribel, a fictional character from the video game Dragon Warrior VII
- Maribel Hearn, a character from the Touhou Project series
