= De Mestre =

de Mestre may refer to:

In people:

- Etienne L. de Mestre (1832–1916), Australian racehorse trainer
- John de Mestre Hutchison, CMG, CVO (1862–1932), British officer of the Royal Navy
- Maribel Parra de Mestre (born 1965), Venezuelan naval officer and oil company executive
- Prosper de Mestre (1789–1844), prominent Sydney businessman

== See also ==
- Mestre (disambiguation)
