= Mestre (disambiguation) =

Mestre is the center and the most populated urban area of the mainland of Venice, part of the territory of the Metropolitan City of Venice, in Veneto, northern Italy.

Mestre may also refer to:

== People ==
=== Surname ===
- Alberto Mestre (swimmer, born 1964) (born 1964), former competition swimmer
- Alexis Arias Mestre (born 1969), Cuban rower
- Audrey Mestre (1974-2002), French world record-setting freediver
- Dayaris Mestre Álvarez (born 1986), Cuban judoka
- Daniel José Pereira Mestre (born 1986), Portuguese professional cyclist
- Diego Mestre (born 1978), Argentine politician
- Felipe del Mestre (born 1993), Argentine rugby union player
- Francina Díaz Mestre, French-born catwalk and photographic model
- Gabriel Antonio Mestre (born 1968), Argentine priest
- Goar Mestre (1912-1994), Cuban-born Argentine businessman
- Gloria Mestre Rodríguez (1928-2012), Mexican dancer, choreographer and actress
- Indira Mestre (born 1979), retired Cuban female volleyball player
- Jordi Mestre (born 1981), Spanish actor and model
- Josep Fontserè i Mestre (1829-1897), Spanish Catalan architect
- Laura Mestre Hevia (1887–1944), Cuban translator, humanist and writer
- Nito Mestre (born 1952), Argentine musician
- Philippe Mestre (1927-2017), French politician
- Ramón Mestre (1927-2003), Argentine politician, former Governor of Córdoba
- Ramón Javier Mestre (born 1987), Argentine lawyer and politician
- Ricardo Mestre (born 1983), Portuguese professional road bicycle racer
- Sergio Mestre (high jumper) (born 1991), Cuban male track and field athlete
- Sergio Mestre (footballer) (born 2005), Spanish footballer
- Soledad Mestre (1948-2012), Spanish jurist and politician, member of the Assembly of Madrid
- Sylvana Mestre (born 1956), Spanish former Chairperson of the International Paralympic Committee Alpine Skiing Sport Technical Committee
- Ted Mestre, American football coach
- Víctor Torres Mestre (born 1970), Spanish retired footballer
- Yagnelis Mestre (born 1983), Cuban judoka

=== Title ===
- Mestre (title)

== See also ==
- De Mestre
