= Marcel de Chollet =

French painter

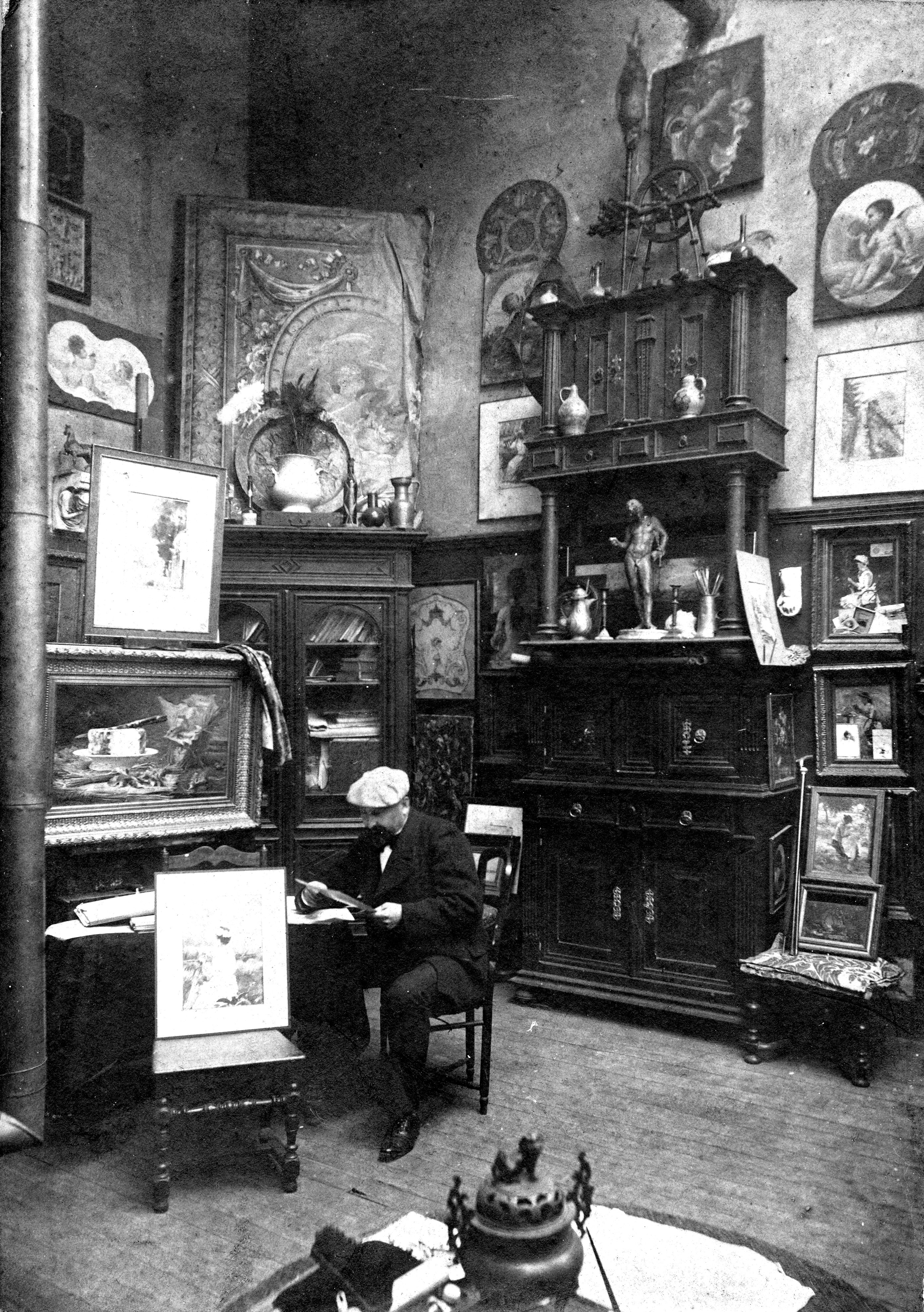
Marcel Chollet in his studio at 17 rue Victor-Massé

Marcel de Chollet or Marcel Chollet (26 October 1855, Geneva – 30 July 1924, Geneva) was a French speaking Swiss painter of the Belle Époque. He is mainly known for his ceiling places in public buildings, hotels and casinos in Switzerland and Paris, which can be assigned to both naturalism and impressionism.

== Life ==
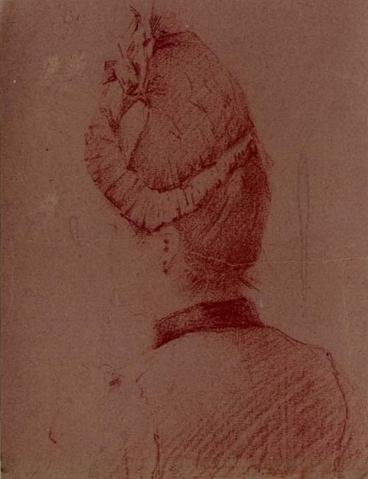
Woman, red chalk drawing by de Chollet

The son of the architect Charles Joseph de Chollet, little is known of de Chollet's youth. He left Switzerland in 1880 to study at the academy in Paris. He worked in the studios of Borchgrave and Bidan, where he graduated in decorative painting. He then joined Pierre-Victor Galland's decorative painting course at the École nationale supérieure des Beaux-Arts and settled in Paris for good at a studio at 17 rue Victor-Massé in Montmartre.

He successfully exhibited still lifes and drawings in Swiss salons between 1883 and 1898 – these works are now in the Musée d’art et d’histoire (Fribourg), Musée d'Art et d'Histoire (Geneva) and the Musée Rath among others. In Paris his work was exhibited at the Salon des artistes français. In 1903 Marcel de Chollet was honoured with a mention at the Paris Salon. He moved away from naturalism in his still lifes, influenced by the portraits of women then being produced in Paris by Claude Monet and Édouard Manet.

His first interior commission was in 1885 for the audience hall of the Federal Supreme Court of Switzerland in Lausanne. In 1895 he painted the main hall at the renowned Hôtel des Alpes-Grand Hôtel in Territet. Further orders followed, though his real breakthrough work was an allegorical scheme for the presidential offices in the Federal Palace of Switzerland in Bern. In 1905 he painted the reading room at the Palais de Rumine in Lausanne and a year later that in the Montreux Palace hotel in Montreux. In 1908 he produced the scheme in the 'Salle del Castillo' at Casino du Rivage in Vevey. However, his work on the 'Grands Magasins du Louvre' was destroyed in 1974.

== Gallery ==
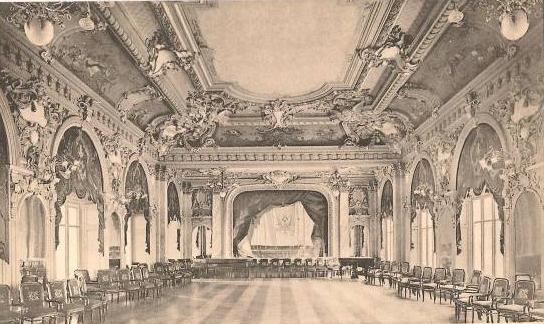
Main hall of the Hôtel des Alpes-Grand Hôtel in Territet, 1895

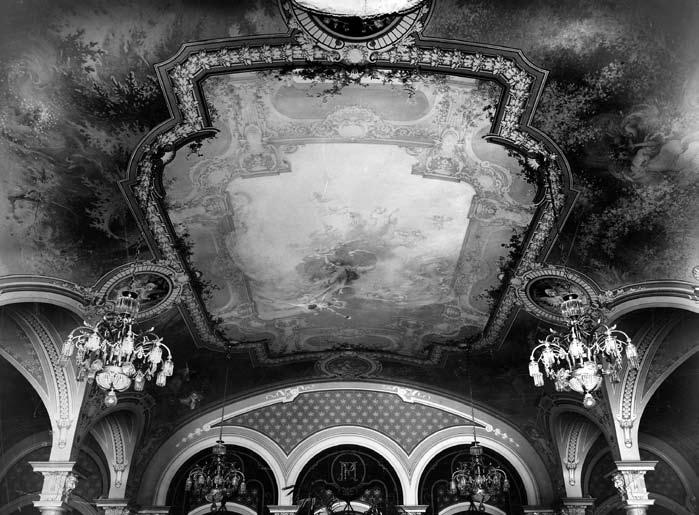
Montreux Palace in Montreux, 1906

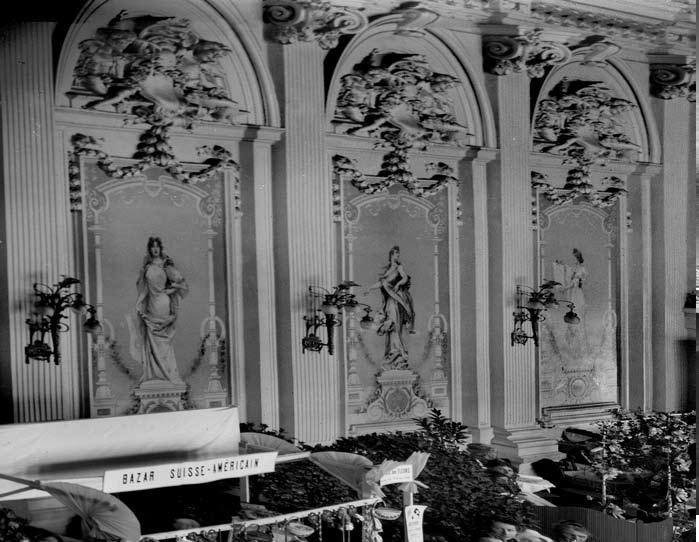
Salle del Castillo in the Casino du Rivage in Vevey, 1908

== Bibliography ==
- (in French) Tamara Robbiani: Marcel Chollet (1855–1924). Un artiste méconnu. In: monuments vaudois, Nr. 2, 2011, S. 19–25.
