= Horst Tappe =

German photographer

Horst Tappe (13 May 1938 in Gütersloh, Germany – 21 August 2005 Vevey, Switzerland) was a German photographer who lived in Switzerland since 1963. Tappe was famous for his portraits of creative artists, writers, philosophers, scientists from around the world.

== Life ==
Horst Tappe was born in 1938 (not 1941 as sometimes published) in Gütersloh. After basic training in a traditional photo studio and an internship at the Hamburg School of Photography, he attended the courses of Marta Hoepffner at the School of Experimental Photography in Hofheim am Taunus near Frankfurt am Main. At the School of Photography in Vevey, Switzerland, he graduated with Oswald Ruppen.

From 1965 until his death, and he lived and worked in Territet-Veytaux (Montreux) on Lake Geneva. He regularly traveled to the big cities of Europe, where he photographed personalities from the visual art, literature, music and politics. Tappe's portrait photographs appeared worldwide for decades in newspapers and magazines and have also been presented in numerous solo exhibitions to the public.

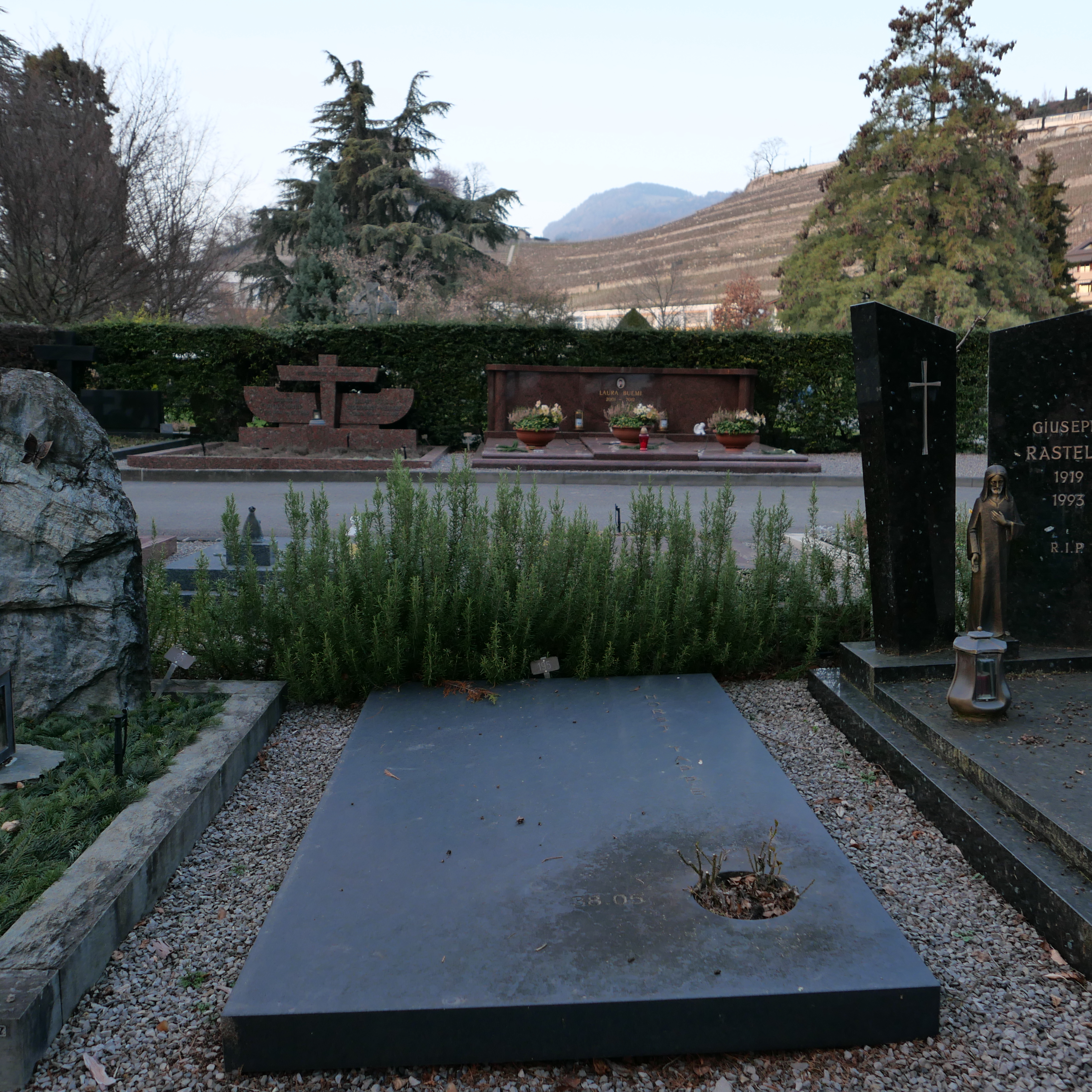
Tappe's grave at the cemetery of Clarens, where Nabokov and Kokoschka are buried as well.

Tappe for many years used to photograph the Russian-American novelist Vladimir Nabokov (1899–1977, author of Lolita) and the painter and graphic artist Oskar Kokoschka (1886–1980, who also was the founder of the Salzburg School of Seeing) friends. Both lived like Tappe on Lake Geneva, the photographer immortalized both in innumerable portraits; a selection of these photos—supplemented by citations of those portrayed—has been published in the form of two books.

Only a few months after the publication of his illustrated book on Kokoschka, Horst Tappe died at the age of 67 years after a short illness at the Hôpital du Samaritain in Vevey.

== Work ==
Portrait photographs of 5,000 writers, visual artists, musicians, politicians and celebrities—among them Konrad Adenauer, Isabel Allende, Willy Brandt, Elias Canetti, Charlie Chaplin, Noël Coward, Salvador Dalí, Ian Fleming, Patricia Highsmith, Ernst Jünger, Oskar Kokoschka, Gabriel García Márquez, Vladimir Nabokov, Pablo Picasso, Ezra Pound, Salman Rushdie, Georges Simenon, Susan Sontag, Wole Soyinka, Igor Stravinsky and Peter Ustinov.

== Exhibitions ==
1999: Montreux, Cognac; 2000: St. Malo; 2002: Bern, Sankt Petersburg, Basel, Chiasso; 2003: Frankfurt am Main, Hamburg, Moscow; 2004: Stuttgart, Paris; 2005: Leipzig, New York, Washington

== Literature ==
- Ezra Pound, Alan Levy, Horst Tappe: "The Voice of Silence", Permanent Press (NY) 1983, ISBN 093296625X
- Ralf Sonnenberg, Dietrich Wasser, Lorenzo Ravagli, Günter Röschert, Michael Muschalle, Earl J Ogletree, Horst Tappe: "Edition thrithemius. Bd 7. 1999", Novalis Media AG 1999, ISBN 3907260066
- Horst Tappe, Tilo Richter (Hrsg.): "Nabokov", Gva Basel 2001, ISBN 3-85616-152-X
- Horst Tappe, Tilo Richter (Hrsg.): "Kokoschka", Gva Basel 2005, ISBN 3-85616-235-6
