= Maribel Rios =

Puerto Rican neuroscientist

- Born: San Juan, Puerto Rico
- Education: BA Neuroscience Boston University (1988) PhD Cell, Molecular, and Developmental Biology Tufts University (1997) Post-doctoral training MIT (1997-2002)
- Occupation: Assistant Professor Tufts University School of Medicine (2002-2010) Associate Professor with Tenure Tufts University (2010-2021) Professor of Neuroscience Tufts University (2021-)

Maribel Rios is a neuroscientist originally from San Juan, Puerto Rico. She received a Bachelor of Arts in neuroscience from Boston University, followed by a Doctor of Philosophy in Cell, Molecular, and Developmental Biology from the Sackler School at Tufts University. Rios continued her studies by attending the Whitehead Institute at the Massachusetts Institute of Technology, where she completed her post-doctoral training in genetics. Following her education, she returned to Tufts where she serves as a professor of neuroscience.

== Early life and education ==
Maribel Rios grew up in San Juan, Puerto Rico and lived there until she was 18 years old. Her father was the first one in his immediate family to go to college. He was able to do this through the G.I. Bill because of his service in the Korean War.

From kindergarten to high school, she attended Academia Santa Monica in Santurce, Puerto Rico. Rios moved from Puerto Rico to Boston where she attended Boston University as a psychology pre-med major. The summer after her junior year of undergrad, she worked in a hematology lab at Harvard University. From 1991 to 1997, she attended graduate school at Tufts University and earned her PhD in Cell, Molecular, and Developmental Biology. From 1997 to 2002, she completed her postdoctoral training at the Whitehead Institute of Massachusetts Institute of Technology.

== Research ==
Rios works on the brain-derived neurotrophic factor (BDNF), which is a member of the neurotrophin family that signals through the TrkB receptor. Rios' lab studies how the depletion of BDNF in the brain affects weight, more specifically how this depletion leads to severe obesity in mice. Rios' lab demonstrated that BDNF is a satiety signal. Rios' lab also discovered the role of estrogen in glucose metabolism that may explain the increased risk for diabetes in post-menopausal women. Rios' lab recently uncovered the potential mechanism behind gabapentin-mediated appetite increase.

Rios currently serves as the director of the Tufts Postbaccalaureate Research Ed Program (PREP), an NIH-funded program geared towards increasing diversity in the biomedical sciences .
