= Jean Chollet =

French scenographer and journalist (1936–2026)

- Born: 23 March 1936
- Died: 14 January 2026 (aged 89)
- Occupations: Scenographer, journalist

Jean Chollet (French: [ʒɑ̃ ʃɔlɛ]; 23 March 1936 – 14 January 2026) was a French scenographer and journalist.

Chollet notably served as publishing director of Actualité de la scénographie from 1983 to 2005 and was editor-in-chief of Jours nouveaux from 2000 to 2003. He was also a permanent collaborator on the Encyclopædia Universalis from 2002 to 2022.

Chollet died on 14 January 2026, at the age of 89.

== Distinctions ==
- Knight of the Ordre des Arts et des Lettres (2020)

== Publications ==
- Les lieux scéniques en France, 1980-1995 (1996)
- Le théâtre de la cité à Toulouse (1997)
- La Comédie-Française, Trois théâtres dans la ville (1997)
- Théâtres en ville, théâtres en vie. Conversations sur la mise en jeu des théâtres à l'italienne (2000)
- Fabre et Perrottet, architectes de théâtre (2005)
- André Acquart, architecte de l'éphémère. Scénographies, décors et costumes de 1950 à 2006 (2006)
- Scénographes en France 1975 - 2012 (2013)
- Scénographes en France 1975-2015 (2015)
