= Fairmont Le Montreux Palace =

Luxury hotel on Lake Geneva, Switzerland

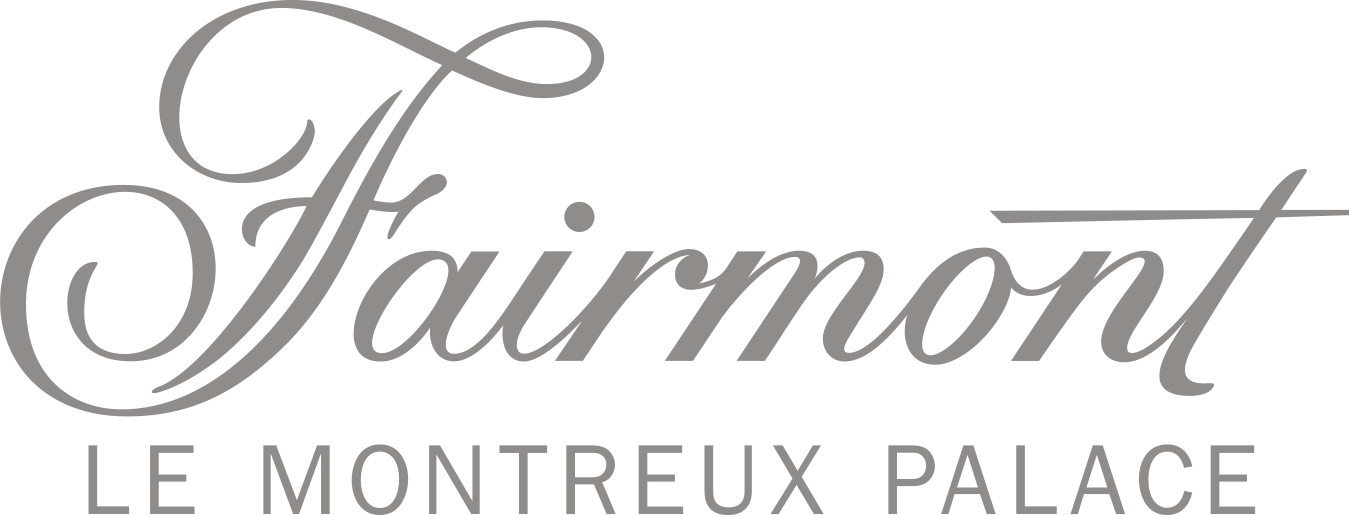

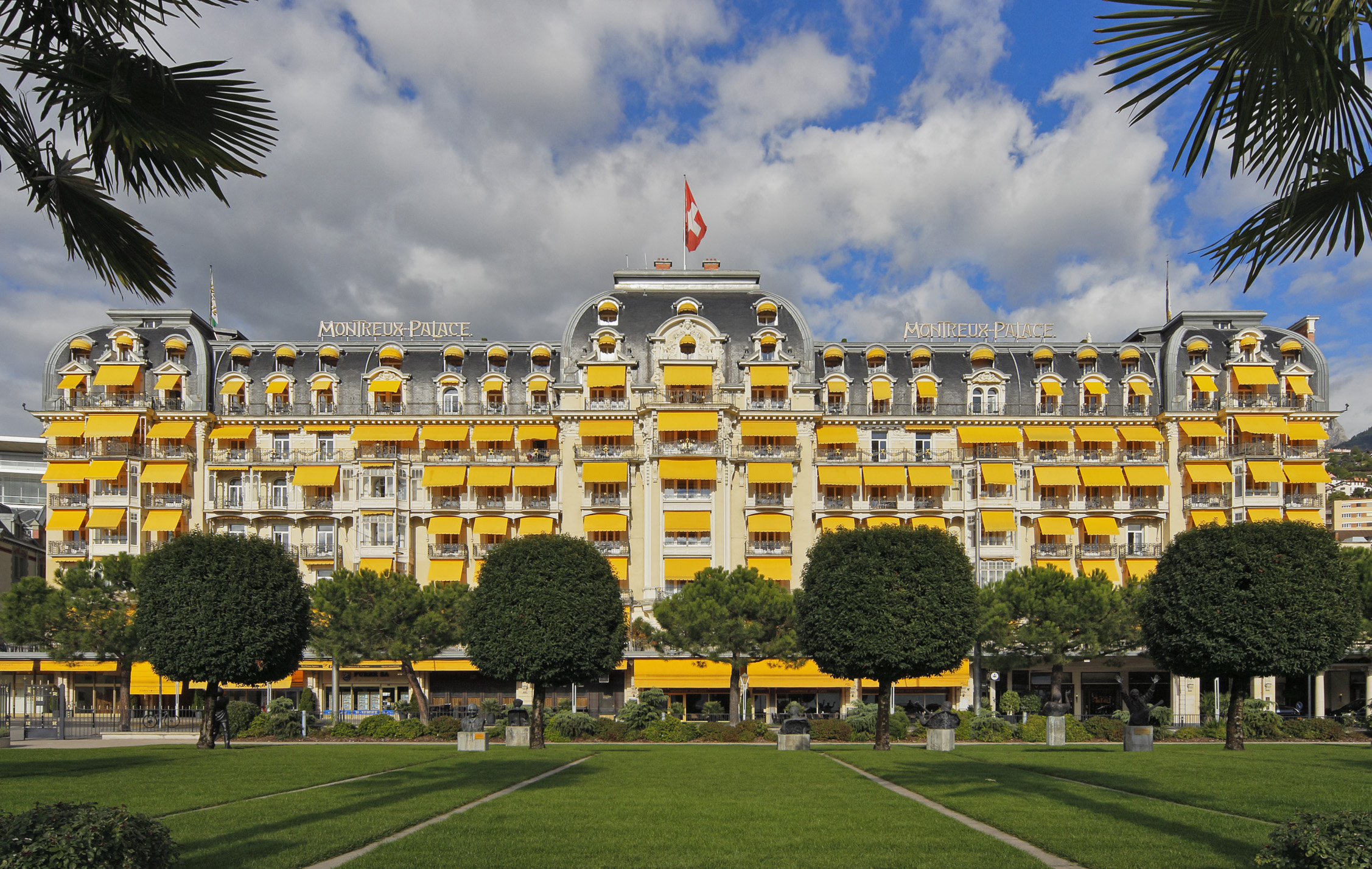
- Interactive map of the Fairmont Le Montreux Palace area
- Hotel chain: Fairmont Hotels and Resorts

General information
- Location: Switzerland, avenue Claude Nobs 2 Montreux, Switzerland
- Coordinates: 46.4387°N 6.9067°E
- Opening: Main: 1906; 120 years ago
- Operator: Fairmont Hotels & Resorts

Technical details
- Floor count: 7

Design and construction
- Architects: Eugène Jost, decor Marcel de Chollet

Other information
- Number of rooms: 236
- Number of restaurants: La Palmeraie; The Montreux Jazz Café; The Lounge Bar; The MP'S Bar & Grill; La Terrasse; Pureaty Café

Website
- fairmont.com/montreux

Fairmont Le Montreux Palace is a luxury hotel located on the shores of Lake Geneva at Avenue Claude Nobs 2, in the city of Montreux in the canton of Vaud in Switzerland, and managed by Michael Smithuis. Built in 1906, the hotel is a member of the Swiss Deluxe Hotels, The Leading Hotels of the World, and Historic Hotels Worldwide. The hotel is part of Fairmont Hotels and Resorts. The Fairmont chain has been part of the AccorHotels group since 2016.

== History ==
Tourism took off in the 1850s, and by the end of the 19th century, in 1881, two Swiss pioneers from Montreux Alexandre Emery and Ami Chessex bought the Hotel du Cygne (built in 1837). In 1895 they founded the company Le Montreux Palace & Cygne.

Swiss architect Eugène Jost built the Palace in a record time of 18 months and the hotel opened on March 19, 1906. The new hotel connected to the original Hotel du Cygne comprises a Salon de Musique, a Grand Hall and richly decorated ballrooms.

The new Palace offering heating, electricity and private bathrooms with hot and cold running water was considered a modern hotel; Distinguished guests from all over the world including European aristocrats, Russian princes, New York bankers, and maharajahs came to the Palace. Entertainment was offered in the afternoon and evening in the theater, ballrooms and music salon.

A sports hall was built in 1911 to entertain guests during the day: The Pavillon, housed a tea room, a skating rink and a shooting range, tennis tournaments took place on the lawn.

World War I: the hotel was used as a hospital to shelter wounded French and British Allied soldiers. After the war, in the 1920s, Montreux regained its former glory with the return of the rich and famous. In 1928, the Montreux Palace took part in the foundation of The Luxury Hotels of Europe and Egypt association.

On 20 July 1936, the important Montreux Convention Regarding the Regime of the Straits treaty (a peace pact between Greece, Turkey, England, France and Russia), was signed at the Montreux Palace in the Salle des Fêtes. Five hundred diplomats invited by the Turkish Republic arrived at the Palace on 23 June 1936. The pact signed on 20 July at 10pm is recalled by a plaque in one of the salons.

During World War II, tourism receded and the hotel was used as a hospital again.

Since then, the palace has been listed as a cultural property of national importance in Switzerland so as to be preserved.

== Guests ==
Since its opening, the hotel has welcomed celebrities; exiled Richard Strauss composed his Four Last Songs at the Palace, Vera Nabokov and her husband Vladimir Nabokov lived in the hotel for the last seventeen years of Vladimir's life and she continued to reside in the hotel after her husband's death. Since the first season of the Montreux Jazz Festival in 1966, many renowned musicians have stayed at the Montreux Palace.

The hotel's Belle Époque decor was selected for some film sequences by Peter Ustinov (Lady L - 1964), The BBC and Luc Besson productions (Kiss of the Dragon - 2001).

The hotel continues to be the venue for conferences, in May 2019, the Fairmont Le Montreux Palace hosted the Bilderberg Meeting.

== The hotel ==
Modernized and redecorated over the years, the hotel, with views over the lake and the Alps, offers:

- 236 rooms and suites (some named after preferred guests like the Quincy Jones suite),
- 15 meeting rooms and ballrooms,
- 2000 m^{2} Spa with indoor pool, outdoor pool, treatment rooms, hammam, sauna, Jacuzzi, beauty salon, fitness,
- Shops, laundry service, valet, hairdresser.

The hotel offers 6 venues – plus 24-hour in-room dining:

- La Palmeraie where breakfast is served every day as well as the Sunday brunch,
- The Montreux Jazz Café inspired by the atmosphere of the Montreux Jazz Festival,
- The Lounge Bar where snacks, hot drinks and refreshments are served,
- The MP'S Bar & Grill offering pieces of meat, fish and seafood,
- La Terrace offering a view of Lake Geneva with Italian and Mediterranean specialties, open in summer only,
- The Funky Claude's Bar offers cocktails accompanied by a simple restoration and live concerts,
- The Pureaty Café is part of the Fairmont Spa and serves healthy food all year round.
