= Hôtel des Alpes-Grand Hôtel =

Former palace buildings in Territet, Switzerland

Coordinates: 46.4256°N 6.9237°E

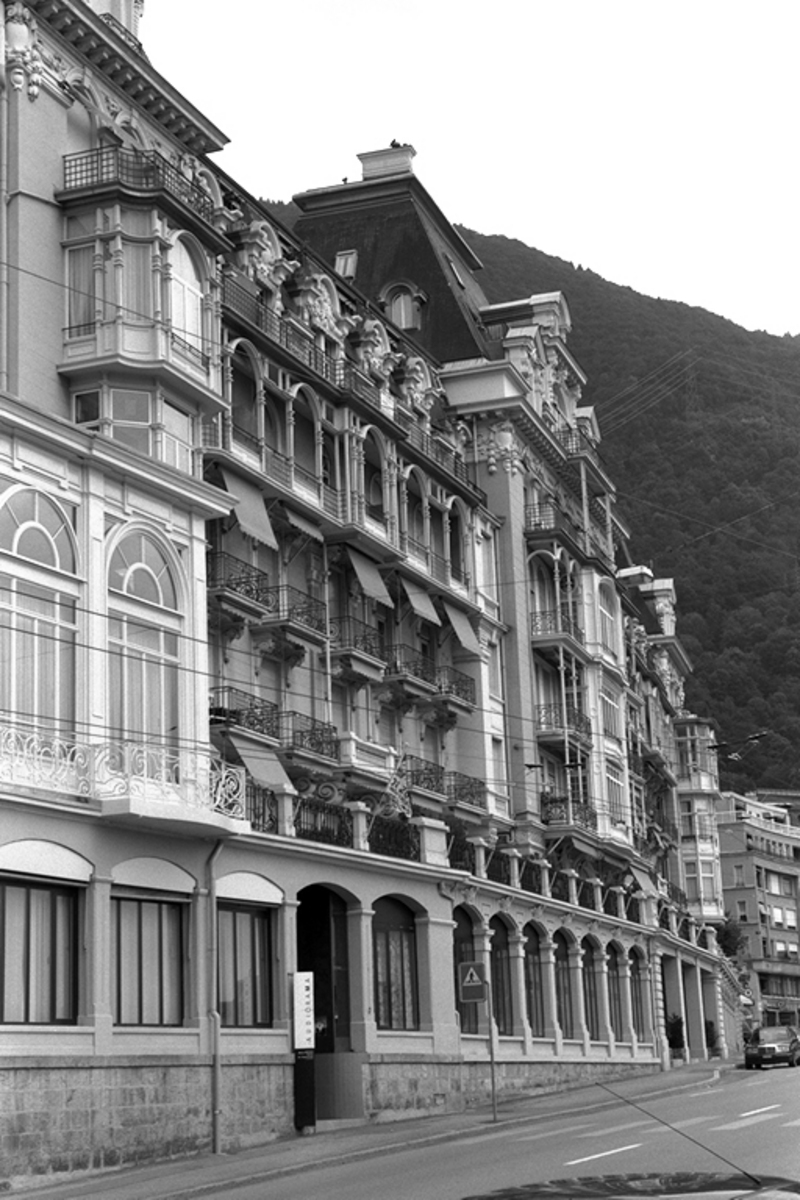
Hôtel des Alpes-Grand Hôtel façade

The Hôtel des Alpes-Grand Hôtel or Résidence des Alpes is an assemblage of former palace buildings in the village of Territet, which is a part of Montreux in Switzerland.

== History ==
In March 1840, the town of Territet bought a parcel of land on which to build a hostel entitled Chasseur des Alpes. Over the following years this hostel was enlarged three times to become - in 1855 - the Hôtel des Alpes. The main building was designed by Henri Chessex, son of the owner and brother of Ami Chessex. The opening of the Hôtel led to a tourist boom and in 1861 a railway line was opened between Montreux and Villeneuve, calling at Territet.

In 1875 a dining hall was added to the building and two years later Ami Chessex chose the architect Louis Maillard (later joined by Eugène Jost) to build the Grand Hôtel beside the Hôtel des Alpes. The decor was by Marcel de Chollet. The two buildings were linked by a corridor and soon formed a single structure. It is classed as a cultural monument.

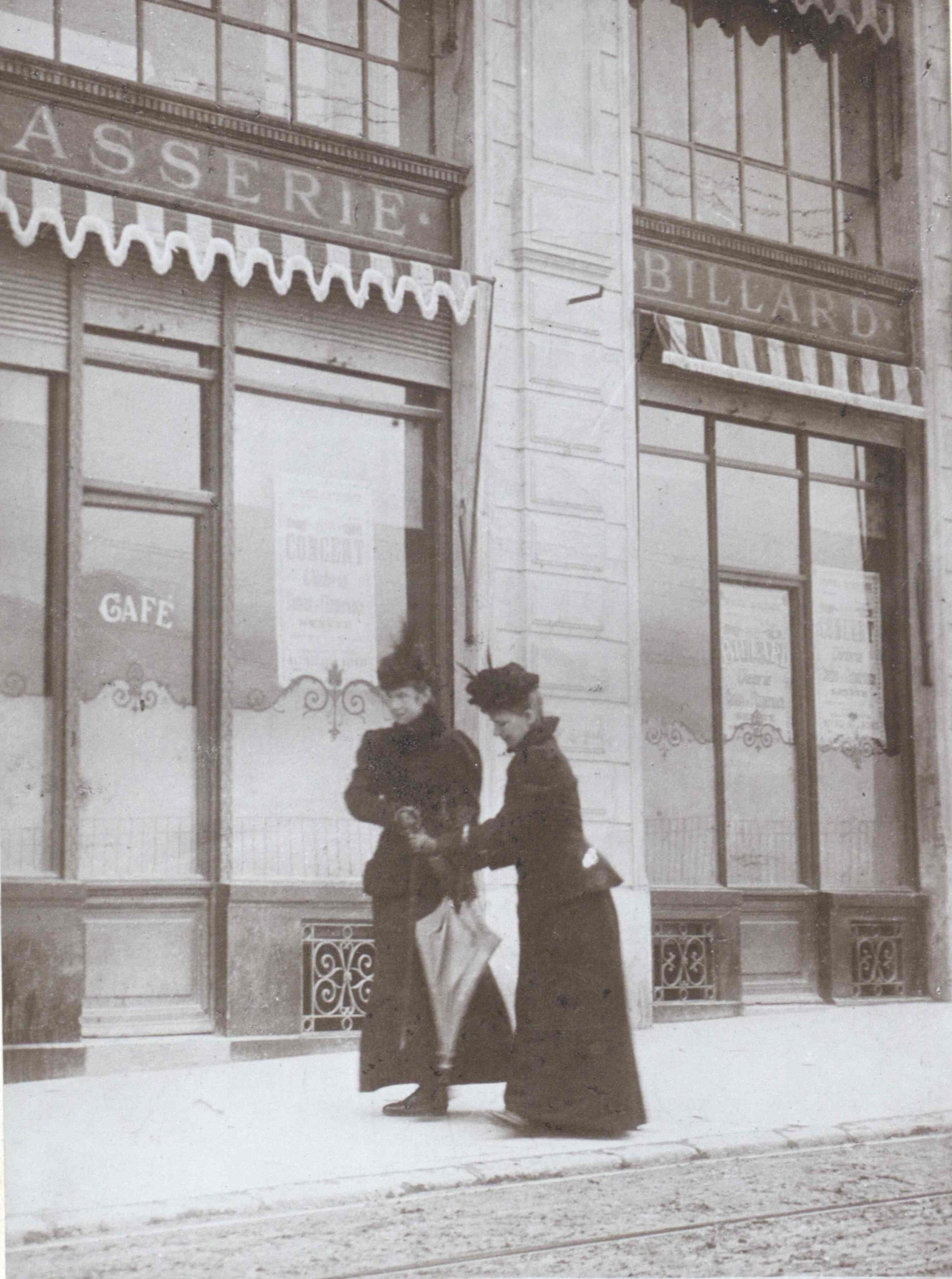
Empress Elisabeth of Austria at the Hotel on 3 September 1898, one week before her death in Geneva.

Among the Hôtel's many notable guests were Elisabeth of Bavaria, who visited four times, and Francis Joseph I of Austria in 1893. The Hôtel built on this success, housing the first telephone in Switzerland. 1888 Roman Mayer opened the first jewelry store Roman Mayer Joaillier in the arcades of the Hotel.

In 1971, Deep Purple temporarily converted one of its corridors to a live room in order to record Machine Head after a flare gun incident set their intended venue, Montreux Casino, on fire, an incident that inspired their signature song, "Smoke on the Water", recorded for Machine Head.

In 1975 it closed and its main hall and dining hall were turned into a theatre, whilst the Grand Hôtel's bedrooms became the National Swiss Audiovisual Museum, though this closed in 2008 and left the premises in 2012 to allow for their renovation.

The hotel suffered fires on 29 January 1984 and 28 September 2012.

== Bibliography (in French) ==
- Grand Hôtel et Hôtel des Alpes Territet. Suisse, 1900
- Gilbert de Montmollin, Le Grand-Hôtel et Hôtel des Alpes de Territet, Audiorama Musée suisse de l'audio-visuel, 1994
- Dave Lüthi, Le Grand Hôtel et Hôtel des Alpes, Territet: rapport historique et architectural, Service des monuments historiques, 1996
- Dave Lüthi, Le Grand-Hôtel et Hôtel des Alpes à Territet (1840-1975): Reflet du développement de Montreux au XIXe siècle : Historique et description, Musée du Vieux-Montreux, 1998
