= Maribel Chollet =

Mexican politician

Maribel Chollet Morán
- Born: 19 January 1971 (age 55); Mazatlán, Sinaloa, Mexico
- Occupation: Politician
- Political party: PRI

Maribel Chollet Morán (born 19 January 1971) is a Mexican politician from the Institutional Revolutionary Party. From 2010 to 2012 she served as Deputy of the LXI Legislature of the Mexican Congress representing Sinaloa.
