= Montreux =

- Municipality
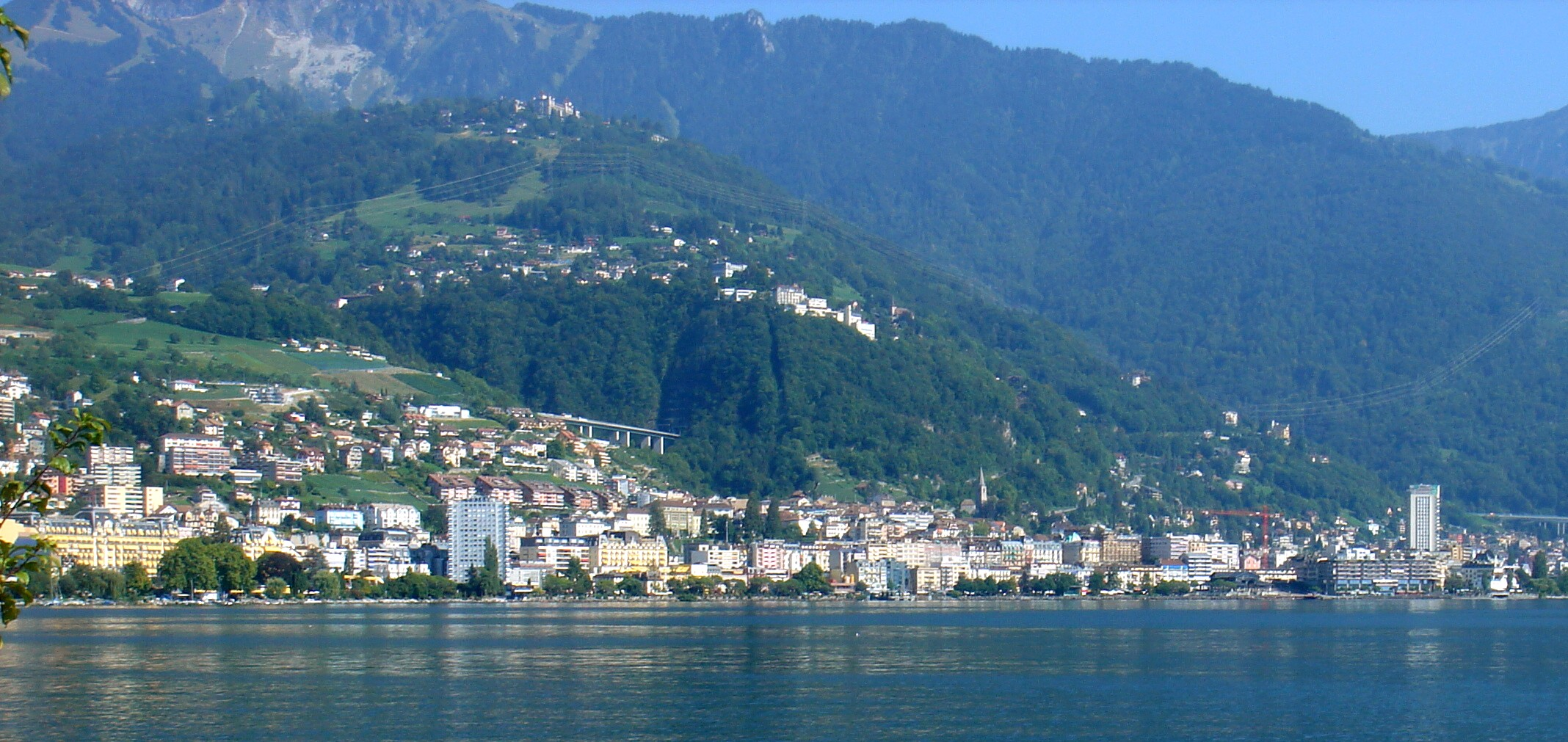
- A view of Montreux

- Flag Coat of arms
- Location of Montreux
- Location within Switzerland Location within Canton of Vaud
- Coordinates: 46°26′06″N 06°54′45″E
- Country: Switzerland
- Canton: Vaud
- District: Riviera-Pays-d'Enhaut

Government
  - Executive: Municipalité with 7 members
  - Mayor: Syndic (list); Olivier Gfeller SPS/PSS
  - Parliament: Conseil communal with 100 members

Area
  - Total: 33.41 km^{2} (12.90 sq mi)
- Elevation (railway station): 396 m (1,299 ft)
- Highest elevation (Naye): 2,021 m (6,631 ft)
- Lowest elevation (Lake Geneva): 374 m (1,227 ft)

Population (2024-12-31)
  - Total: 26,955 (31.12.24)
  - Density: 806.8/km^{2} (2,090/sq mi)
- Time zone: UTC+01:00 (CET)
  - Summer (DST): UTC+02:00 (CEST)
- Postal codes: 1815 Clarens, 1816 Chailly-Montreux, 1817 Brent, 1820 Montreux, 1820 Territet, 1822 Chernex, 1823 Glion, 1824 Caux, 1832 Chamby, 1832 Villard-sur-Chamby, 1833 Les Avants
- SFOS number: 5886
- ISO 3166 code: CH-VD
- Localities: Baugy, Brent, Caux, Chailly-sur-Montreux, Chamby, Chaulin, Chêne, Chernex, Clarens, Collonge, Cornaux, Crin, Fontanivent, Glion, Jor, Le Châtelard, Les Avants, Les Planches, Mont-Fleuri, Pallens, Pertit, Planchamp, Sonzier, Tavel, Territet, Vernex, Villard-sur-Chamby, Vuarennes
- Surrounded by: Villeneuve, Blonay, Haut-Intyamon, La Tour-de-Peilz, Noville, Veytaux
- Twin towns: Wiesbaden (Germany), Menton (France), Chiba City (Japan)
- Website: https://www.montreux.ch Profile (in French),

Montreux (UK: /mɒ̃ˈtrɜː/, US: /mɒ̃ˈtroʊ/; French: [mɔ̃tʁø]; Arpitan: Montrolx) is a Swiss municipality and town on the shoreline of Lake Geneva at the foot of the Alps. It belongs to the Riviera-Pays-d'Enhaut district in the canton of Vaud, having a population of nearly 27,000 with about 85,000 in the Vevey-Montreux agglomeration as of 2019.

Located in the centre of a region named the Vaud or Swiss Riviera (French: Riviera vaudoise), Montreux has been an important tourist destination since the 19th century due to its mild climate. The region includes numerous Belle Époque palaces and hotels near the shores of Lake Geneva. Montreux railway station is a stop on the Simplon Railway and is a mountain railway hub.

== History ==
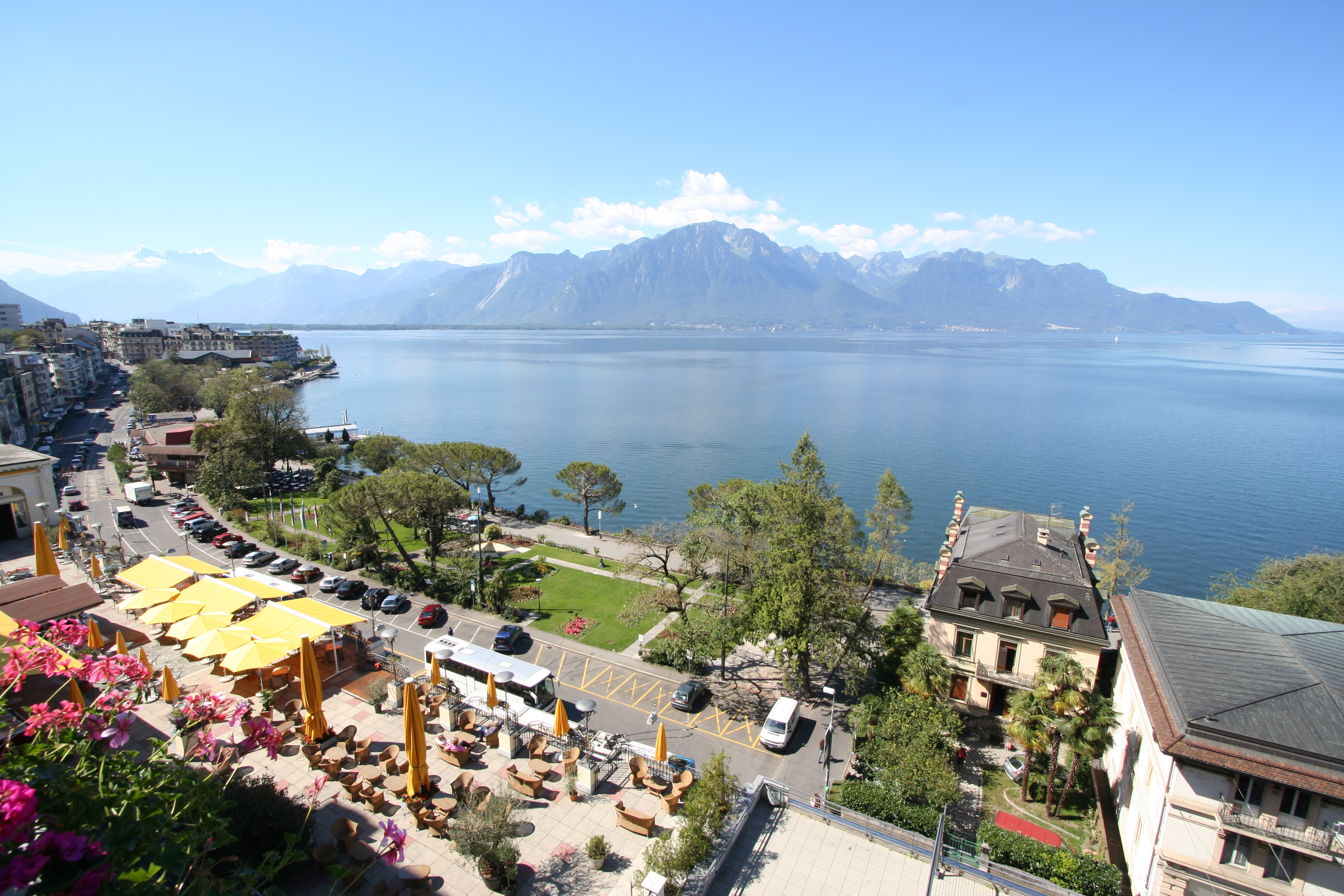
Lake Geneva from Montreux

The earliest settlement was a Late Bronze Age village at Baugy. Montreux lies on the north east shore of Lake Geneva at the fork in the Roman road from Italy over the Simplon Pass, where the roads to the Roman capital of Aventicum and the road into Gaul through Besançon separated. This made it an important settlement in the Roman era. A Roman villa from the 2nd-4th centuries and a 6th–7th century cemetery have been discovered.

The name derives from a small monastery (Latin: monasteriolum) on the site by the 11th century, which subsequently developed as Mustruel, Muchtern (1215), Muistruum (1228), Monstruacum, Mustruz, and Moutru. Viniculture was introduced in the 12th century, and the sunny slopes of the lake from Lavaux to Montreux became an important winegrowing region. In 1295, the Bishop of Sion sold the parish of Montreux to Girard of Oron. In 1317, it was split between the Lords of Oron (Le Châtelard) and the Counts of Savoy (Les Planches). A Brotherhood of the Holy Spirit administered estates and a hospital in Montreux starting in about 1309.

The region was subject to various princes, most notably the princes of Savoy from the south side of the lake. They unified the territory which comprises the present canton of Vaud and were generally popular sovereigns.

After the Burgundian Wars in the 15th century, the Swiss in Bern occupied the region without resistance, an indication of the weakness of the princes of Savoy. Under Bernese rule (1536–1798) it belonged to the Bailiwick of Chillon (renamed in 1735 into the Bailiwick of Vevey).

The Reformation made the region around Montreux and Vevey an attractive haven for Huguenots from Italy, who brought their artisanal skills and set up workshops and businesses.

The abbey of Les Echarpes blanches was founded in 1626.

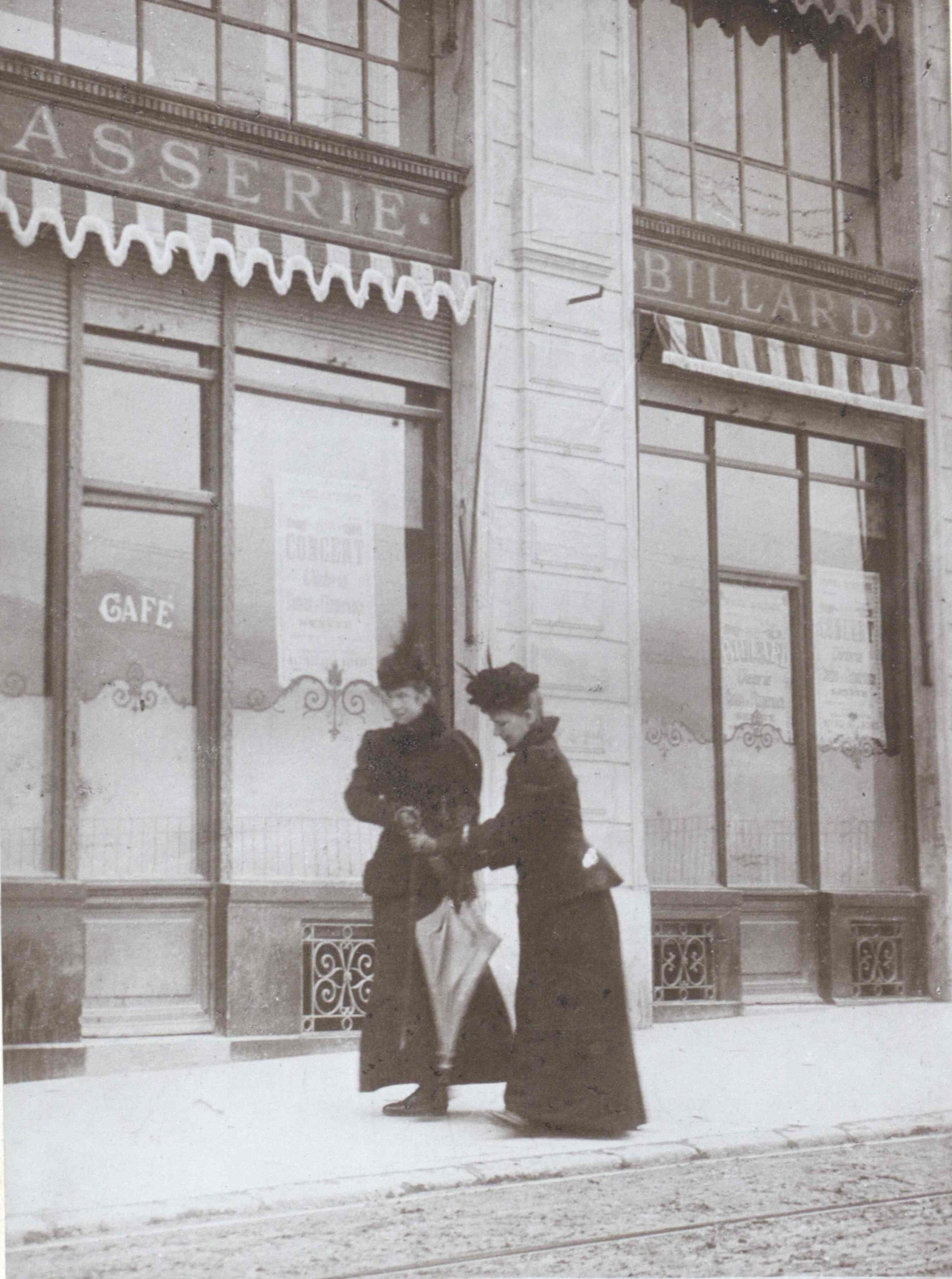
Empress Elisabeth of Austria at the Hôtel des Alpes-Grand Hôtel in Territet on 3 September 1898 (one week before dying).

In 1798, the French captured the region from the Bernese. In the 19th century, the tourist industry became a major commercial outlet, with the grand hotels of Montreux attracting the rich and cultured from Europe and America.

Starting in the 19th century there were three independent municipalities that shared a central authority. This county council was made up of four deputies from Le Châtelard, two from Les Planches and one from Veytaux. The church, the market hall of La Rouvenaz, the secondary school (the building was from 1872 and 1897) and the slaughter-house (1912) were all owned by the county council. Each municipality had its own taxes and a mayor. In 1962, the municipalities of Le Châtelard and Les Planches merged, while Veytaux remained independent.

== Geography ==
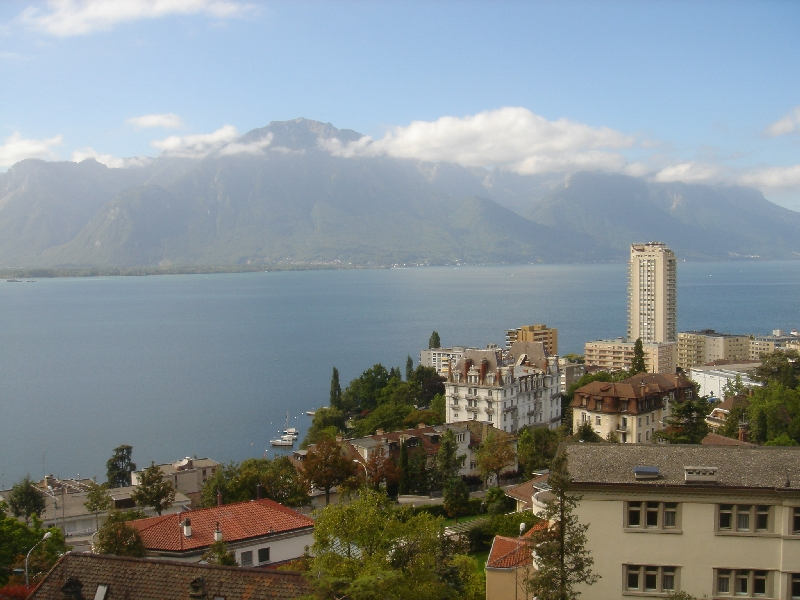
Montreux and Lake Geneva

Aerial view (1949)

Montreux has an area, as of 2009, of 33.41 km^{2} (12.90 mi^{2}). Of this area, 8.34 km^{2} (3.22 mi^{2}) or 25.0% is used for agricultural purposes, while 16.80 km^{2} (6.49 mi^{2}) or 50.3% is forested. Of the rest of the land, 6.68 km^{2} (2.58 mi^{2}) or 20.0% is settled (buildings or roads), 0.09 km^{2} (22 acres) or 0.3% is either rivers or lakes and 1.55 km^{2} (0.60 mi^{2}) or 4.6% is unproductive land.

Of the built up area, housing and buildings make up 11.8% and transportation infrastructure made up 6.4%. Out of the forested land, 46.8% of the total land area is heavily forested and 2.9% is covered with orchards or small clusters of trees. Of the agricultural land, 1.5% is used for growing crops and 9.9% is pastures, while 1.2% is used for orchards or vine crops and 13.7% is used for alpine pastures. All the water in the municipality is flowing water.

The municipality was part of the Vevey District until it was dissolved on 31 August 2006, and Montreux became part of the new district of Riviera-Pays-d'Enhaut.

The municipality stretches from Lake Geneva to the foothills of the Swiss Alps (Rochers-de-Naye). It includes the former municipalities of Montreux-Les Planches (until 1952 Les Planches) and Montreux-Le Châtelard (until 1952 Le Châtelard). It was formed in 1962 with the merger of the two former municipalities.

== Climate ==
The Köppen Climate Classification subtype for Montreux's climate is "Cfb" (Marine West Coast Climate/Oceanic climate).

Climate data for Montreux-Clarens (1961–1990)
Month	Jan	Feb	Mar	Apr	May	Jun	Jul	Aug	Sep	Oct	Nov	Dec	Year
Mean daily maximum °C (°F)	4.5 (40.1)	6.2 (43.2)	9.6 (49.3)	13.9 (57.0)	18.2 (64.8)	21.8 (71.2)	24.9 (76.8)	23.9 (75.0)	20.5 (68.9)	15.2 (59.4)	9.3 (48.7)	5.5 (41.9)	14.5 (58.1)
Daily mean °C (°F)	1.5 (34.7)	2.8 (37.0)	5.4 (41.7)	9.1 (48.4)	13.3 (55.9)	16.7 (62.1)	19.3 (66.7)	18.6 (65.5)	15.5 (59.9)	10.9 (51.6)	5.8 (42.4)	2.4 (36.3)	10.1 (50.2)
Mean daily minimum °C (°F)	−0.8 (30.6)	0.3 (32.5)	2.4 (36.3)	5.5 (41.9)	9.5 (49.1)	12.8 (55.0)	15.1 (59.2)	14.7 (58.5)	12.0 (53.6)	8.0 (46.4)	3.3 (37.9)	0.0 (32.0)	6.9 (44.4)
Average precipitation mm (inches)	90 (3.5)	86 (3.4)	104 (4.1)	109 (4.3)	119 (4.7)	157 (6.2)	130 (5.1)	158 (6.2)	117 (4.6)	104 (4.1)	114 (4.5)	91 (3.6)	1,379 (54.3)
Average snowfall cm (inches)	10 (3.9)	8 (3.1)	4 (1.6)	1 (0.4)	0 (0)	0 (0)	0 (0)	0 (0)	0 (0)	0 (0)	3 (1.2)	8 (3.1)	34 (13)
Average precipitation days (≥ 1.0 mm)	11.6	10.6	12.4	11.9	13.8	13.1	10.3	12	9.5	8.9	11	11.3	136.4
Average snowy days (≥ 1.0 cm)	2.7	1.9	0.9	0.3	0.0	0.0	0.0	0.0	0.0	0.0	0.8	2.0	8.6
Average relative humidity (%)	81	77	73	70	71	71	69	72	76	81	80	81	75
Source: MeteoSwiss

== Demographics ==
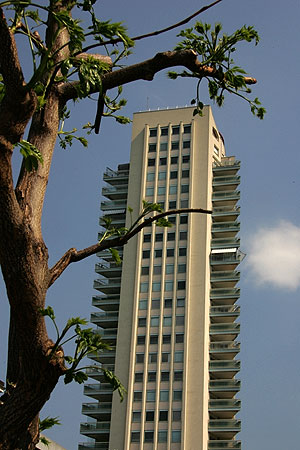
High rise in Montreux

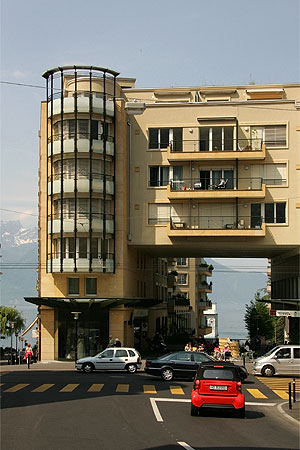
Apartment building in Montreux

Montreux has a population (as of December 2020) of 26,090. As of 2008, 44.2% of the population are resident foreign nationals. Over the last 10 years (1999–2009) the population has changed at a rate of 14.7%. It has changed at a rate of 22.3% due to migration and at a rate of -0.8% due to births and deaths.

Most of the population (as of 2000) speaks French (16,695 or 74.4%) as their first language, with German being second most common (1,398 or 6.2%) and Italian being third (897 or 4.0%). There are 9 people who speak Romansh.

The age distribution, as of 2009, in Montreux is; 2,050 children or 8.3% of the population are between 0 and 9 years old and 3,021 teenagers or 12.2% are between 10 and 19. Of the adult population, 4,216 people or 17.0% of the population are between 20 and 29 years old. 3,016 people or 12.2% are between 30 and 39, 3,552 people or 14.4% are between 40 and 49, and 3,048 people or 12.3% are between 50 and 59. The senior population distribution is 2,565 people or 10.4% of the population are between 60 and 69 years old, 1,795 people or 7.3% are between 70 and 79, there are 1,206 people or 4.9% who are between 80 and 89, and there are 263 people or 1.1% who are 90 and older.

As of 2000, there were 9,380 people who were single and never married in the municipality. There were 9,758 married individuals, 1,631 widows or widowers and 1,685 individuals who are divorced.

As of 2000, there were 9,823 private households in the municipality, and an average of 2 persons per household. There were 4,198 households that consist of only one person and 402 households with five or more people. Out of a total of 10,236 households that answered this question, 41.0% were households made up of just one person and there were 53 adults who lived with their parents. Of the rest of the households, there are 2,563 married couples without children, 2,245 married couples with children. There were 605 single parents with a child or children. There were 159 households that were made up of unrelated people and 413 households that were made up of some sort of institution or another collective housing.

In 2000 there were 1,375 single family homes (or 43.2% of the total) out of a total of 3,183 inhabited buildings. There were 1,024 multi-family buildings (32.2%), along with 530 multi-purpose buildings that were mostly used for housing (16.7%) and 254 other use buildings (commercial or industrial) that also had some housing (8.0%).

In 2000, a total of 9,553 apartments (70.7% of the total) were permanently occupied, while 3,043 apartments (22.5%) were seasonally occupied and 916 apartments (6.8%) were empty. As of 2009, the construction rate of new housing units was 1.6 new units per 1000 residents.

As of 2003 the average price to rent an average apartment in Montreux was 1067.93 Swiss francs (CHF) per month (US$850, £480, €680 approx. exchange rate from 2003). The average rate for a one-room apartment was 567.76 CHF (US$450, £260, €360), a two-room apartment was about 787.77 CHF (US$630, £350, €500), a three-room apartment was about 1014.16 CHF (US$810, £460, €650) and a six or more room apartment cost an average of 1817.64 CHF (US$1450, £820, €1160). The average apartment price in Montreux was 95.7% of the national average of 1116 CHF. The vacancy rate for the municipality, in 2010, was 0.55%.

The historical population is given in the following chart:

== Heritage sites of national significance ==
The Swiss heritage site of national significance in Montreux includes: The Audiorama (also known as the Swiss National Audiovisual Museum), Crêtes Castle, Châtelard Castle, the Train Station, the Hôtel Montreux Palace, the Caux Palace Hotel, the Île and Villa Salagnon, the Marché couvert, the Grand-Hôtel/the Hôtel des Alpes (which served as the recording studio for Deep Purple's Machine Head album), and the Villa Karma.

The entire urban village of Territet / Veytaux as well as the Caux, Montreux and Villas Dubochet areas are all part of the Inventory of Swiss Heritage Sites.

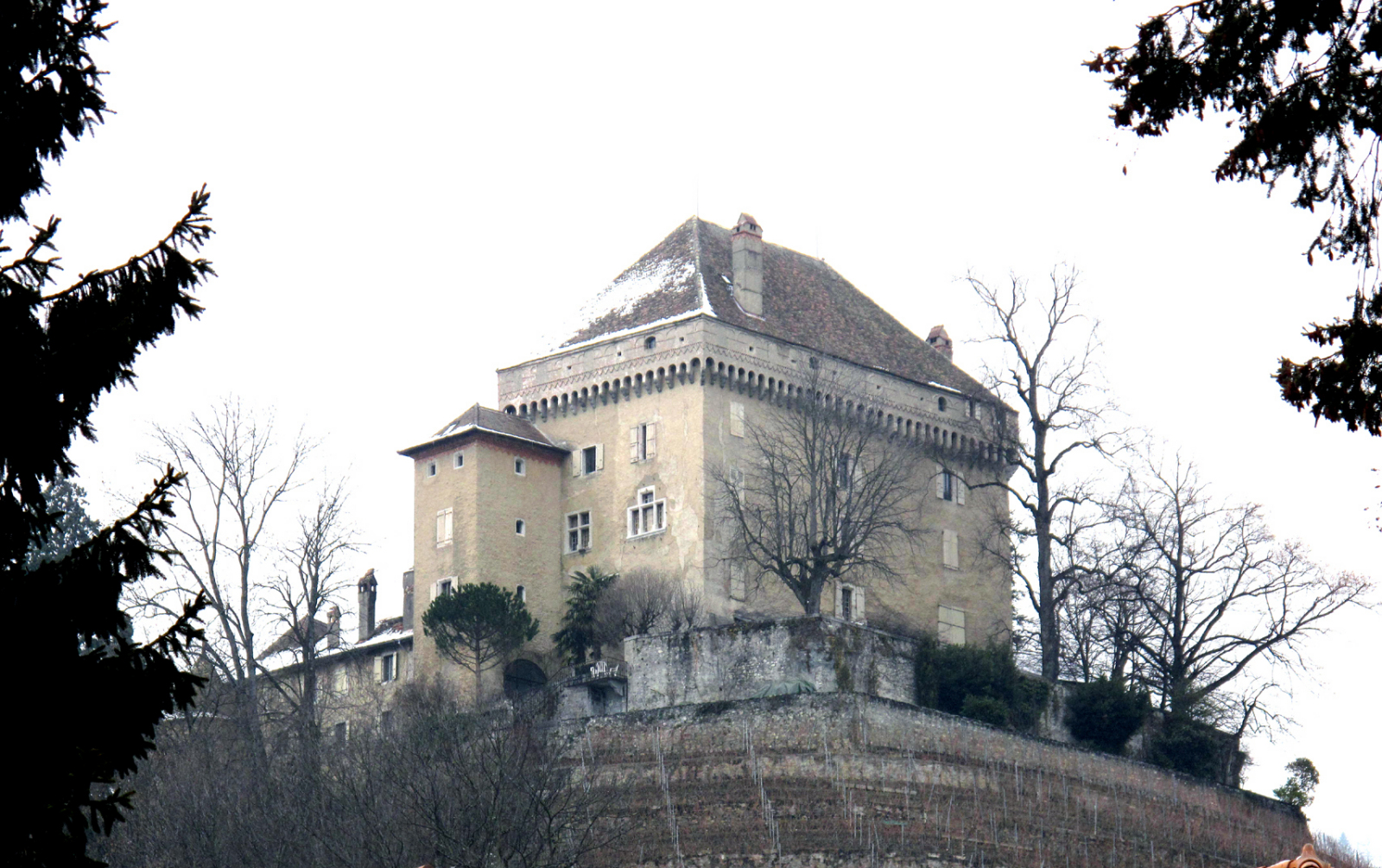
Châtelard Castle

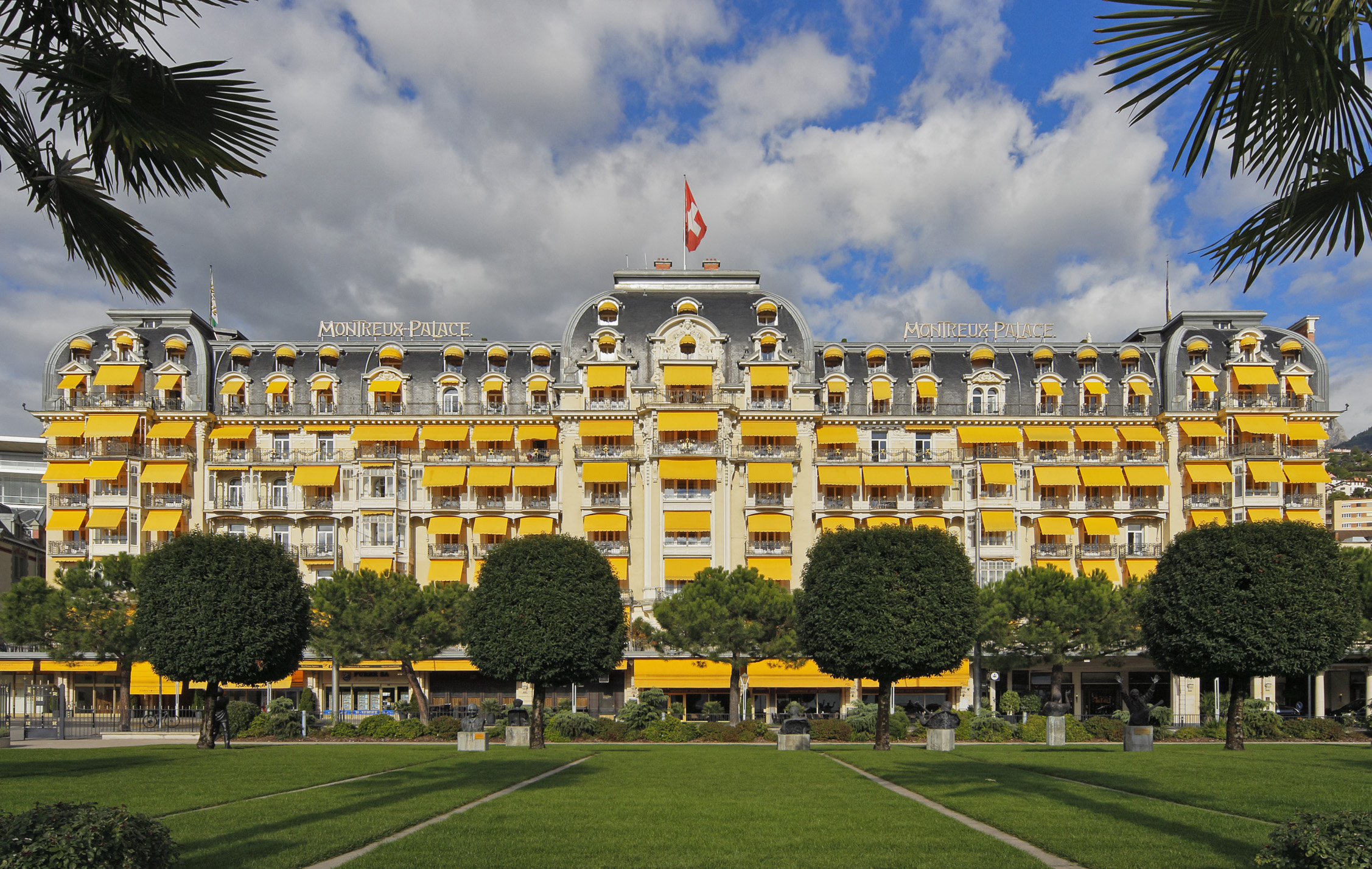
Hôtel Montreux Palace

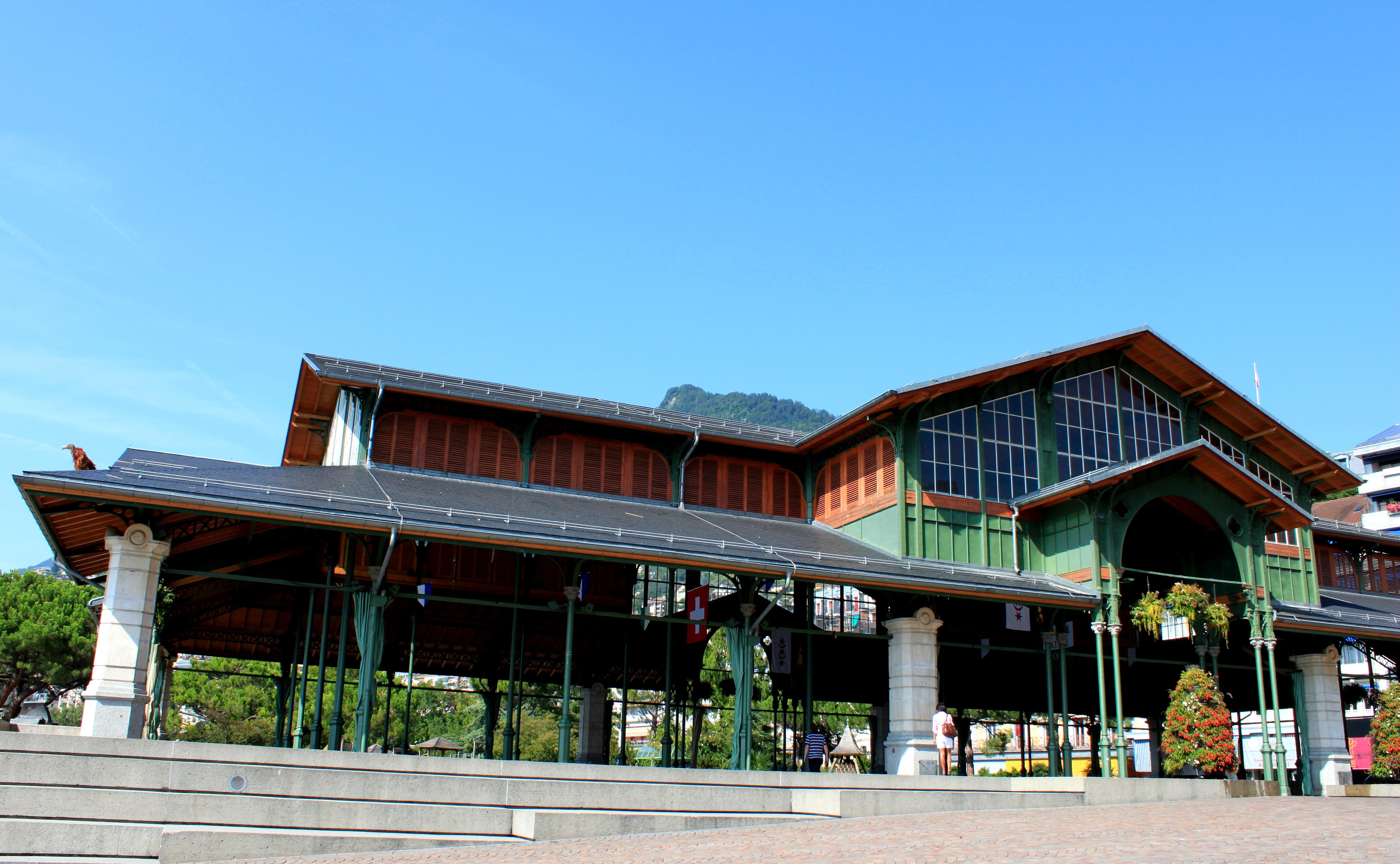
Marché couvert

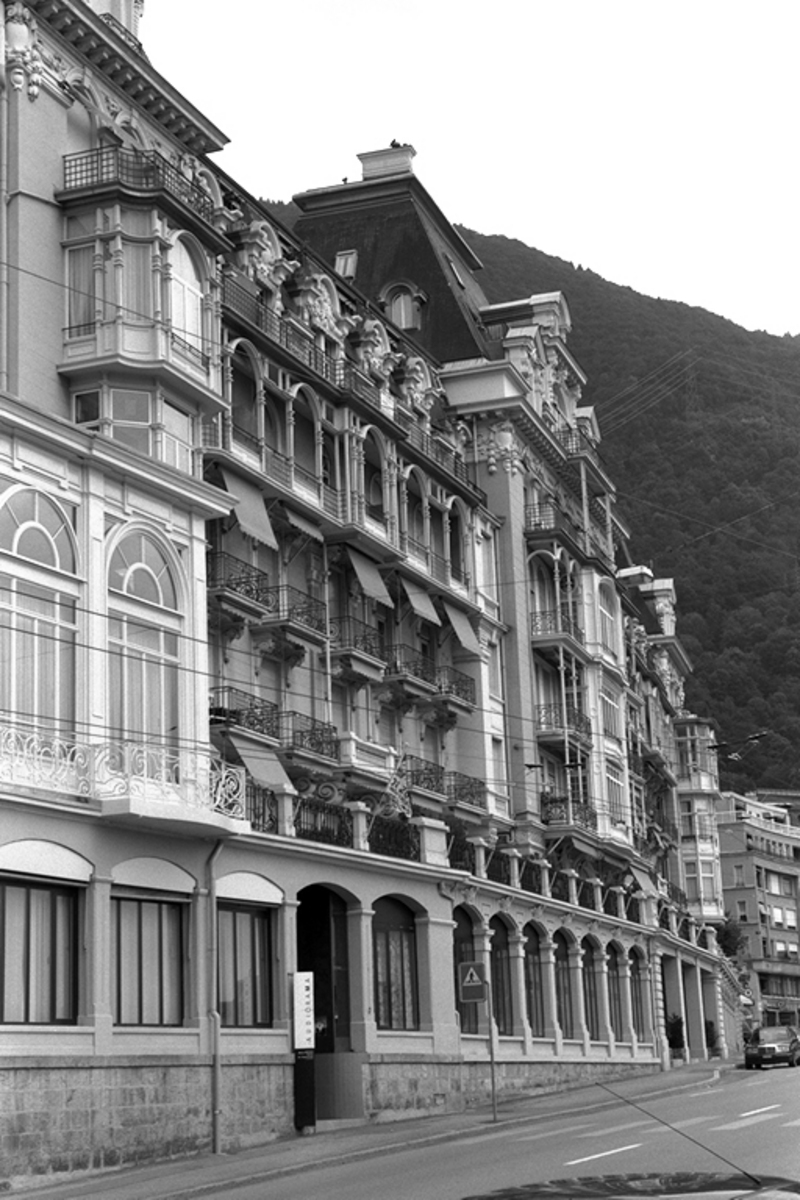
The Grand Hôtel de Territet, formerly Hôtel des Alpes

== Twin towns ==
Montreux is twinned with the towns of

- Menton, France
- Wiesbaden, Germany
- Chiba, Japan

== Politics ==
In the 2007 federal election the most popular party was the SP which received 22.11% of the vote. The next three most popular parties were the SVP (21.97%), the FDP (16.06%) and the Green Party (13.49%). In the federal election, a total of 4,473 votes were cast, and the voter turnout was 39.7%.

== Economy ==
As of 2010, Montreux had an unemployment rate of 6.9%. As of 2008, there were 70 people employed in the primary economic sector and about 27 businesses involved in this sector. 1,165 people were employed in the secondary sector and there were 174 businesses in this sector. 9,290 people were employed in the tertiary sector, with 999 businesses in this sector. There were 10,202 residents of the municipality who were employed in some capacity, of which females made up 46.1% of the workforce.

In 2008 the total number of full-time equivalent jobs was 8,991. The number of jobs in the primary sector was 55, of which 31 were in agriculture, 17 were in forestry or lumber production and 6 were in fishing or fisheries. The number of jobs in the secondary sector was 1,118 of which 403 or (36.0%) were in manufacturing and 708 (63.3%) were in construction. The number of jobs in the tertiary sector was 7,818. In the tertiary sector; 1,296 or 16.6% were in wholesale or retail sales or the repair of motor vehicles, 439 or 5.6% were in the movement and storage of goods, 1,311 or 16.8% were in a hotel or restaurant, 70 or 0.9% were in the information industry, 564 or 7.2% were the insurance or financial industry, 458 or 5.9% were technical professionals or scientists, 943 or 12.1% were in education and 1,591 or 20.4% were in health care.

In 2000, there were 4,949 workers who commuted into the municipality and 4,964 workers who commuted away. The municipality is a net exporter of workers, with about 1.0 workers leaving the municipality for every one entering. About 2.3% of the workforce coming into Montreux are coming from outside Switzerland, while 0.0% of the locals commute out of Switzerland for work. Of the working population, 22.5% used public transportation to get to work, and 50.9% used a private car.

== Religion ==
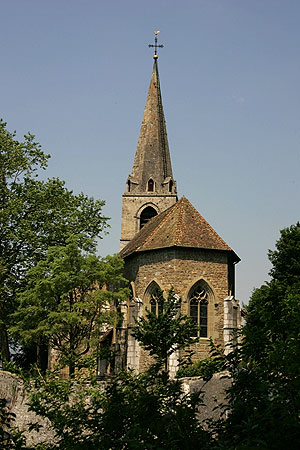
St. Vincent church in Montreux

From the 2000 census, 8,557 or 38.1% were Roman Catholic, while 6,438 or 28.7% belonged to the Swiss Reformed Church. Of the rest of the population, there were 745 members of an Orthodox church (or about 3.32% of the population), there were 18 individuals (or about 0.08% of the population) who belonged to the Christian Catholic Church, and there were 925 individuals (or about 4.12% of the population) who belonged to another Christian church. There were 73 individuals (or about 0.33% of the population) who were Jewish, and 1,031 (or about 4.59% of the population) who were Muslim. There were 80 individuals who were Buddhist, 171 individuals who were Hindu and 90 individuals who belonged to another church. 2,796 (or about 12.45% of the population) belonged to no church, are agnostic or atheist, and 1,941 individuals (or about 8.64% of the population) did not answer the question.

== Education ==
In Montreux about 7,464 (33.2%) of the population have completed non-mandatory upper secondary education, and 3,171 or (14.1%) have completed additional higher education (either university or a Fachhochschule). Of the 3,171 who completed tertiary schooling, 39.8% were Swiss men, 25.3% were Swiss women, 19.8% were non-Swiss men and 15.1% were non-Swiss women.

In the 2009/2010 school year there were a total of 2,106 students in the Montreux school district. In the Vaud cantonal school system, two years of non-obligatory pre-school are provided by the political districts. During the school year, the political district provided pre-school care for a total of 817 children of which 456 children (55.8%) received subsidized pre-school care. The canton's primary school program requires students to attend for four years. There were 1,056 students in the municipal primary school program. The obligatory lower secondary school program lasts for six years and there were 931 students in those schools. There were also 119 students who were home schooled or attended another non-traditional school.

As of 2000, there were 490 students in Montreux who came from another municipality, while 790 residents attended schools outside the municipality.

=== Public libraries ===
Montreux is home to the Bibliothèque municipale de Montreux et Veytaux library. The library has (as of 2008) 48,948 books or other media, and loaned out 99,490 items in the same year. It was open a total of 274 days with average of 28 hours per week during that year.

=== Private schools ===
The Riviera School or École Riviera, an international school, is in Montreux.

Other local schools include Surval Montreux (an international all girls boarding school) and St George's School in Switzerland (British International School, in Clarens).

Institut Monte Rosa, an international co-educational boarding school, is in Territet.

Private hospitality schools in the area include Swiss Hotel Management School (in Caux), HIM Business School (Montreux), and Glion Institute of Higher Education (Glion).

== Transportation ==
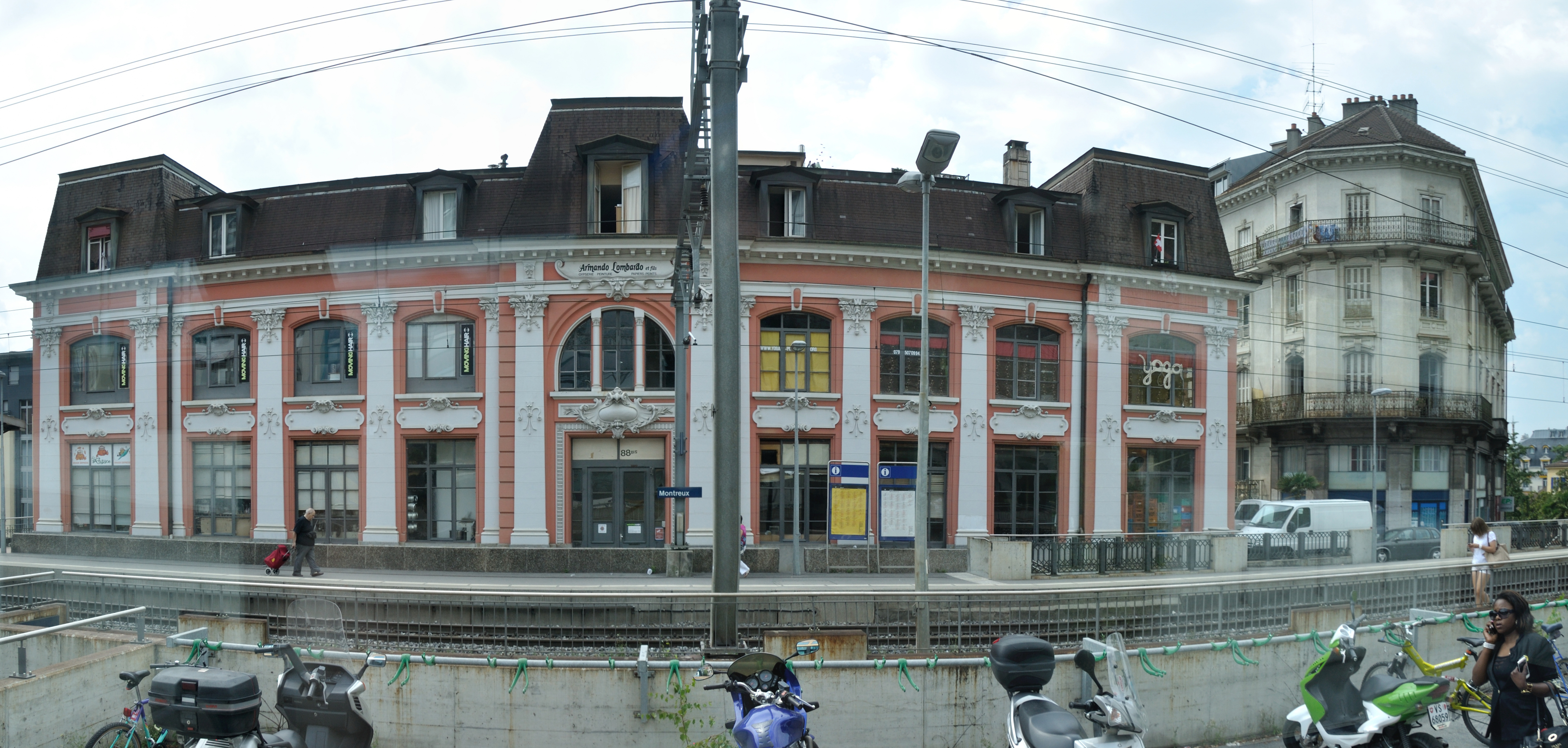
The Montreux station building in 2012

Montreux has three railway stations on the Simplon line, Clarens, Territet, and Montreux. The latter is also the western terminus of the Montreux–Glion–Rochers-de-Naye and Montreux–Lenk im Simmental lines, both of which climb into the hills away from Lake Geneva and have several dozen stations within Montreux.

== Culture ==
Montreux was a haven for Catherine Barkley and Lt. Frederic Henry in Ernest Hemingway's classic novel A Farewell to Arms.

Montreux hosts several festivals:

- The Septembre musical de Montreux, founded in 1946 and held every year since then.
- Freddie Celebration Days — Montreux Celebration is organising this major and entirely free event in Montreux around September 5, the birthday of Freddie Mercury, late singer of the band Queen.
- The Montreux Jazz Festival, held annually in July since 1967. It is held at the Montreux Convention Centre, built in 1973, and has become a global phenomenon.
- The Golden Rose Festival, annually in spring (1961–2003), which awarded the Golden Rose of Montreux, an international award for television.
- The Golden Award of Montreux, annually in April, is traditionally, since 1989, the first international advertising and multimedia Competition in Europe – starting the global season for awarding creative excellence.

Montreux has a walking trail along the lake, stretching from Villeneuve to Vevey. The main square of the town, Place du Marché, features a statue of Freddie Mercury facing Lake Geneva. Some of the numerous small cities around Montreux include La Tour-de-Peilz, and Villeneuve. The Château of Chillon has views over Lake of Geneva and can be accessed via bus, train, walk or boat.

Deep Purple traveled to Montreux in December 1971 to record Machine Head. The band's song "Smoke on the Water" tells of the events of December 1971, when a Frank Zappa fan with a flare gun set the Montreux Casino on fire, destroying the casino where they had originally planned to record the album. Thanks to Claude Nobs, who eventually arranged alternate locations, the Grand Hôtel de Territet was where almost the entirety of the album was created and recorded, except for "Smoke on the Water" which had already been partly recorded at the "Le Petit Palais", formerly called "Le Pavilion". Deep Purple again returned in 1973 to record Burn. The Montreux Casino was reopened in 1975, and later a monument commemorating Deep Purple and their song "Smoke on the Water" was built along the lake shore, with the band's name, the song title, and the riff in musical notes. However, the only other memorial dedicated to the band's song that can be found nowadays in Montreux, is a small plaque placed outside the back entrance of the former Grand Hôtel de Territet.

The Dubliners's song "Montreux Monto" on their album Live at Montreux was recorded live at the Montreux Jazz Festival in 1976.

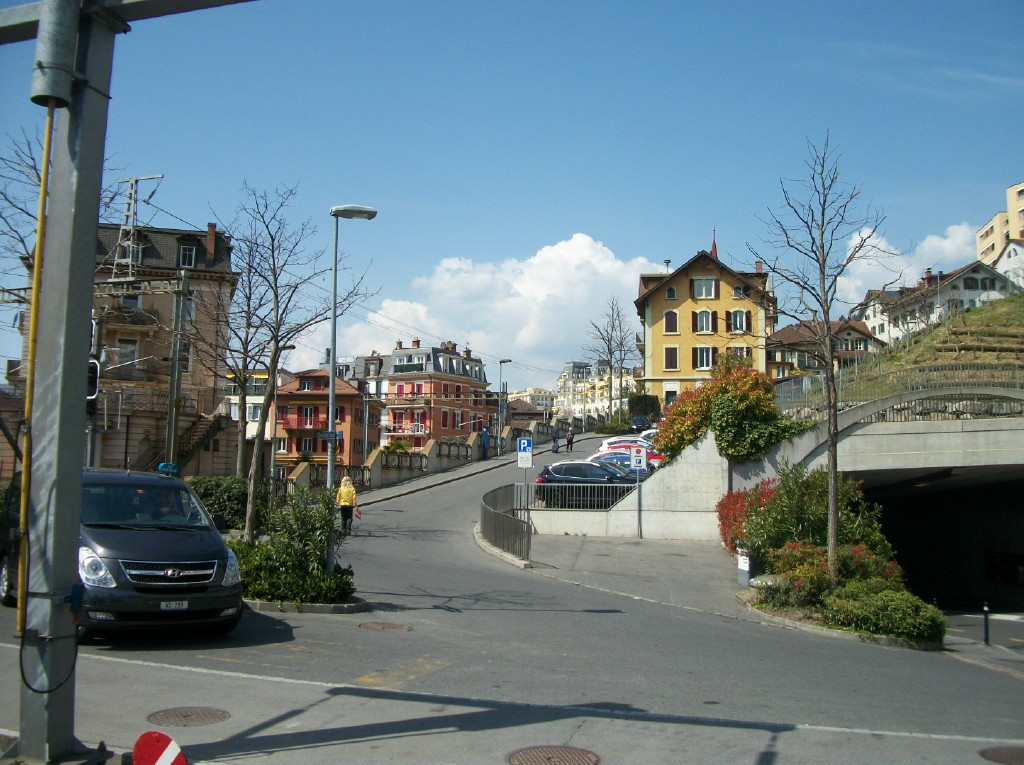
View of Montreux town from Montreux railway station

Montreux is the home of Mountain Studios, the recording studio used by several artists. "Bonzo's Montreux" by Led Zeppelin is named after the city where the drums session of John Bonham was recorded in 1976. In 1978, the band Queen bought the studio. It was then sold to Queen producer David Richards. In 2002, the Mountain Studios was converted into a bar as part of a complete renovation of the studio. David Richards has left Montreux to settle down somewhere else. Queen also appeared in 1984 and in 1986 at the Golden Rose Festival and Queen guitarist Brian May appeared in 2001 at the Jazz Festival. Montreux was also the subject of the 1995 Queen single "A Winter's Tale" on the album Made in Heaven, one of Freddie's last songs before his death on 24 November 1991. The album cover features the statue of Mercury beside the lake.

In 1990, the Wakker Prize for the development and preservation of its architectural heritage was awarded to Montreux.

The Fédération Internationale de Roller Sports was founded in Montreux in 1924. Montreux HC, the oldest roller hockey club in Switzerland (founded in 1911) is based in Montreux.

The symphonic metal band Ad Infinitum was founded in Montreux.

== Notable residents ==
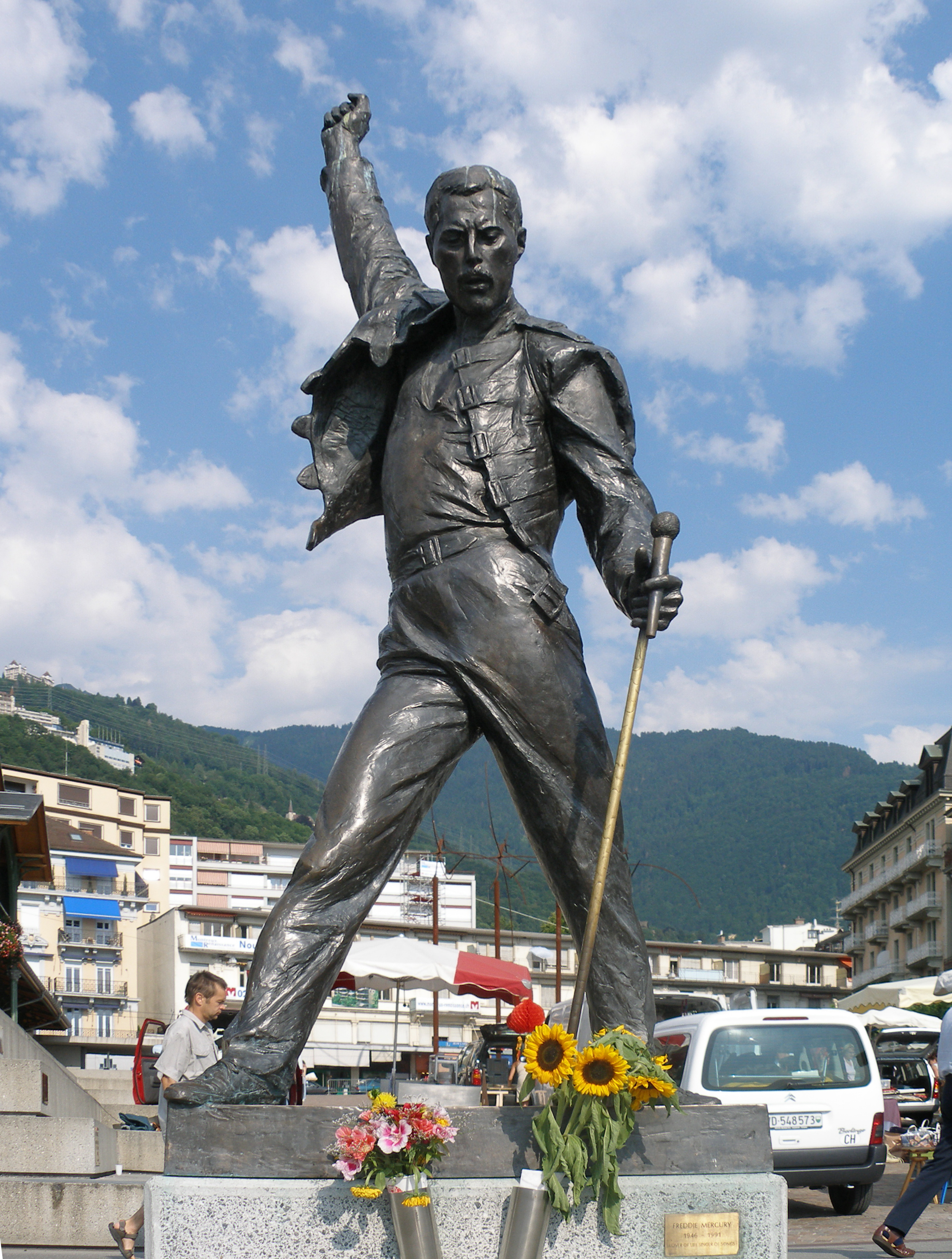
Freddie Mercury statue

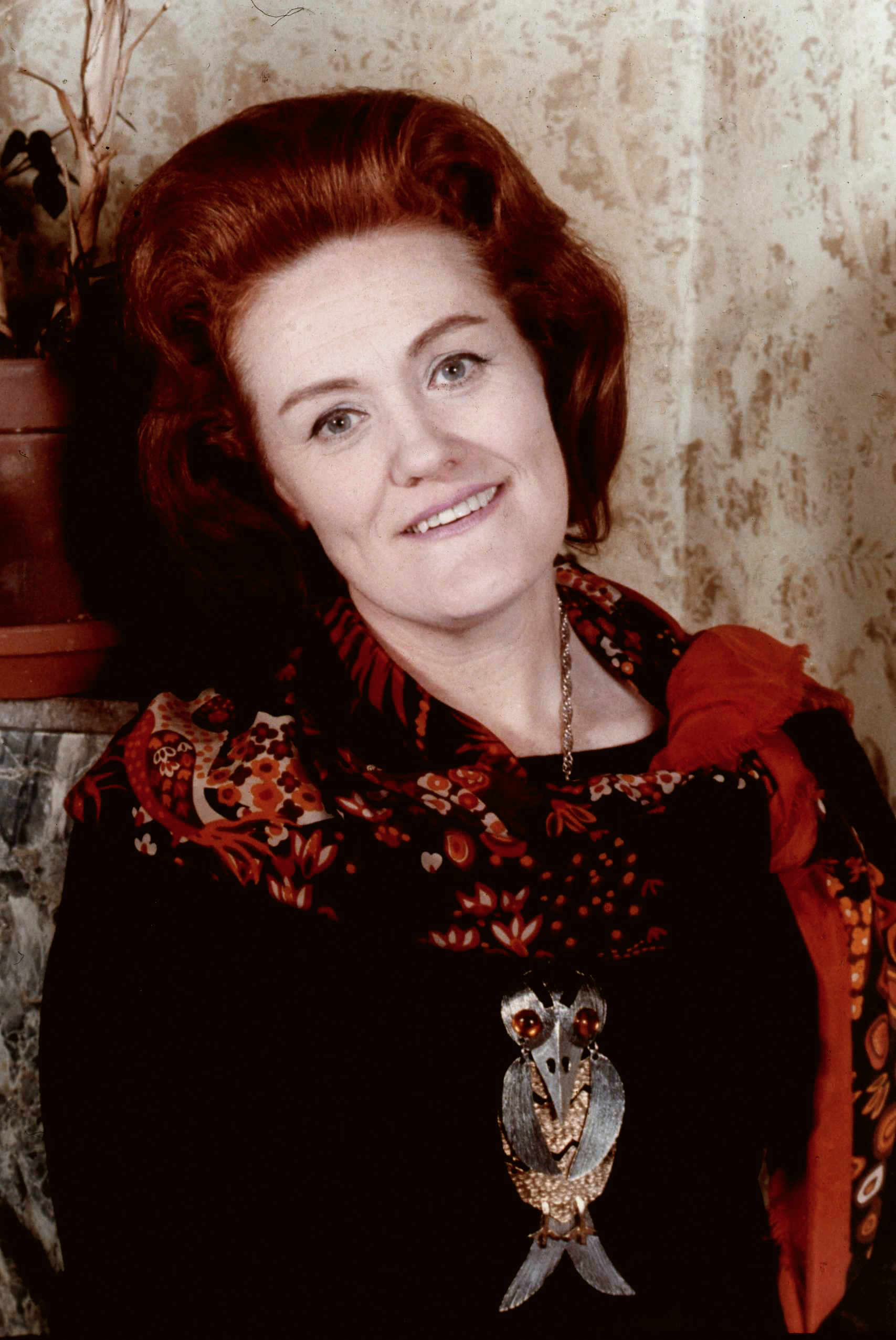
Dame Joan Sutherland, 1975

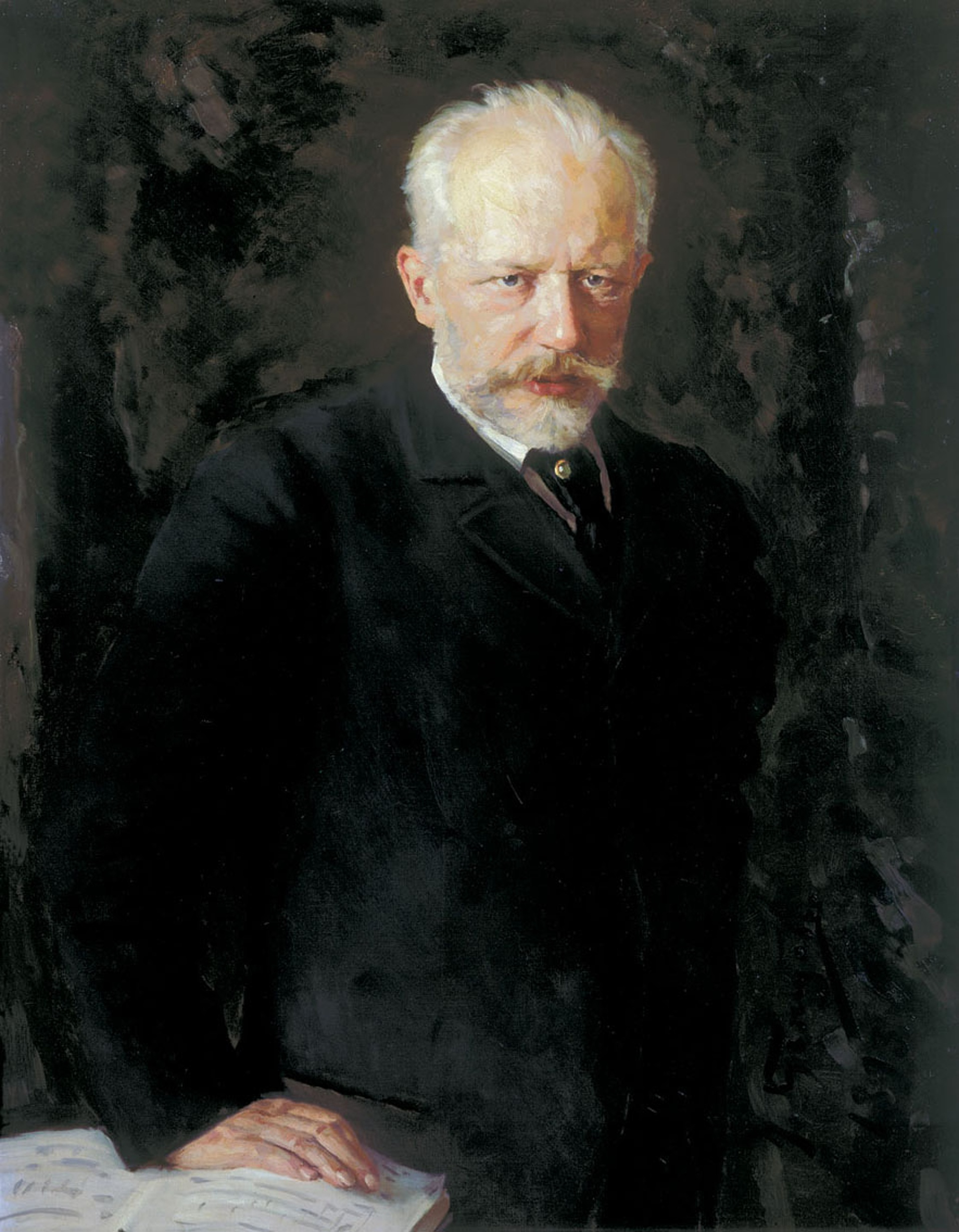
Pyotr Iliych Tchaikovsky

- Claude Abravanel (1924–2012), a pianist and composer of classical music
- Ian Anderson (born 1947), Scottish musician, frontman of Jethro Tull
- Jim Beach (born 1942), the manager of the British rock band Queen
- Alain Bernheim (born 1931), former musician now Masonic researcher
- David Bowie (1947–2016), British musician
- Sergei Aleksandrovich Buturlin (1872–1938), Russian ornithologist
- Noël Coward (1899–1973), English playwright, composer, director, actor and singer
- A. J. Cronin (1896–1981), Scottish novelist and physician
- Laurent Dufaux (born 1969), Swiss cyclist
- Zelda Fitzgerald (1900–1948), wife of American author F. Scott Fitzgerald
- Jens Peter Jacobsen (1847-1885), Danish author
- Douglas Jardine (1900–1958), cricketer, 22 Test matches for England, captain 15 times.
- Patrick Juvet (1950–2021), a model turned singer-songwriter
- Oskar Kokoschka (1886–1980), an Austrian poet, playwright and expressionistic artist
- Baron Carl Gustaf Emil Mannerheim (1867–1951), Finnish statesman
- Georg Baron von Manteuffel-Szoege (1889–1962) a German politician
- Freddie Mercury (1946–1991), British musician, lead singer of Queen
- Vladimir Nabokov (1899–1977), a Russian-born novelist, poet, translator and entomologist
- Claude Nobs (1939–2013), Swiss founder of Montreux Jazz Festival
- Clément Novalak (born 2000), French-Swiss racing driver
- Luc Plamondon (born 1942), French-Canadian lyricist
- Bezalel Rakow (1927–2003) an orthodox rabbi of Gateshead’s Jewish community
- Uri Rosenthal (born 1945), Dutch politician, Minister of Foreign Affairs 2010–2012
- Dame Joan Sutherland, OM, AC, DBE (1926–2010), Australian opera singer
- Horst Tappe (1938–2005), German photographer of creative artists, writers and philosophers
- Pyotr Iliych Tchaikovsky (1840–1893), Russian composer
- Joannes Benedictus van Heutsz (1851–1924), Governor General of Dutch East Indies
- Jean Villard (1895–1982), a chansonnier, poet, comedian, actor and cabaretist.
- Rick Wakeman (born 1949), English keyboardist (Yes)
- Franz Weber (1927-2019), an environmentalist and animal welfare activist
- Yechiel Yaakov Weinberg (1884–1966), a Lithuanian Orthodox rabbi, posek, and rosh yeshiva
- Weltin Wolfinger (1926–2010), a Liechtenstein bobsledder, competed in the 1956 Winter Olympics
- Ardeshir Zahedi (1928–2021), former Iranian foreign minister and son-in-law of Shah of Iran
- Fazlollah Zahedi (1892–1963), former Iranian Prime Minister of Iran

== Gallery ==
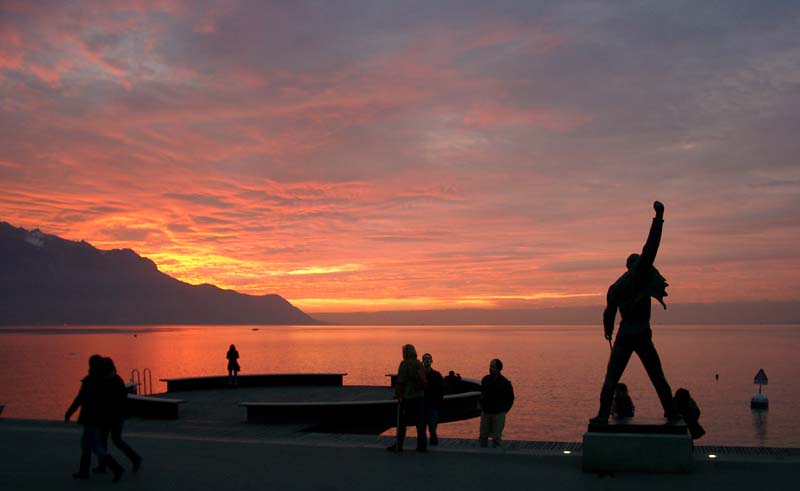
Freddie Mercury statue at sunset in Montreux.

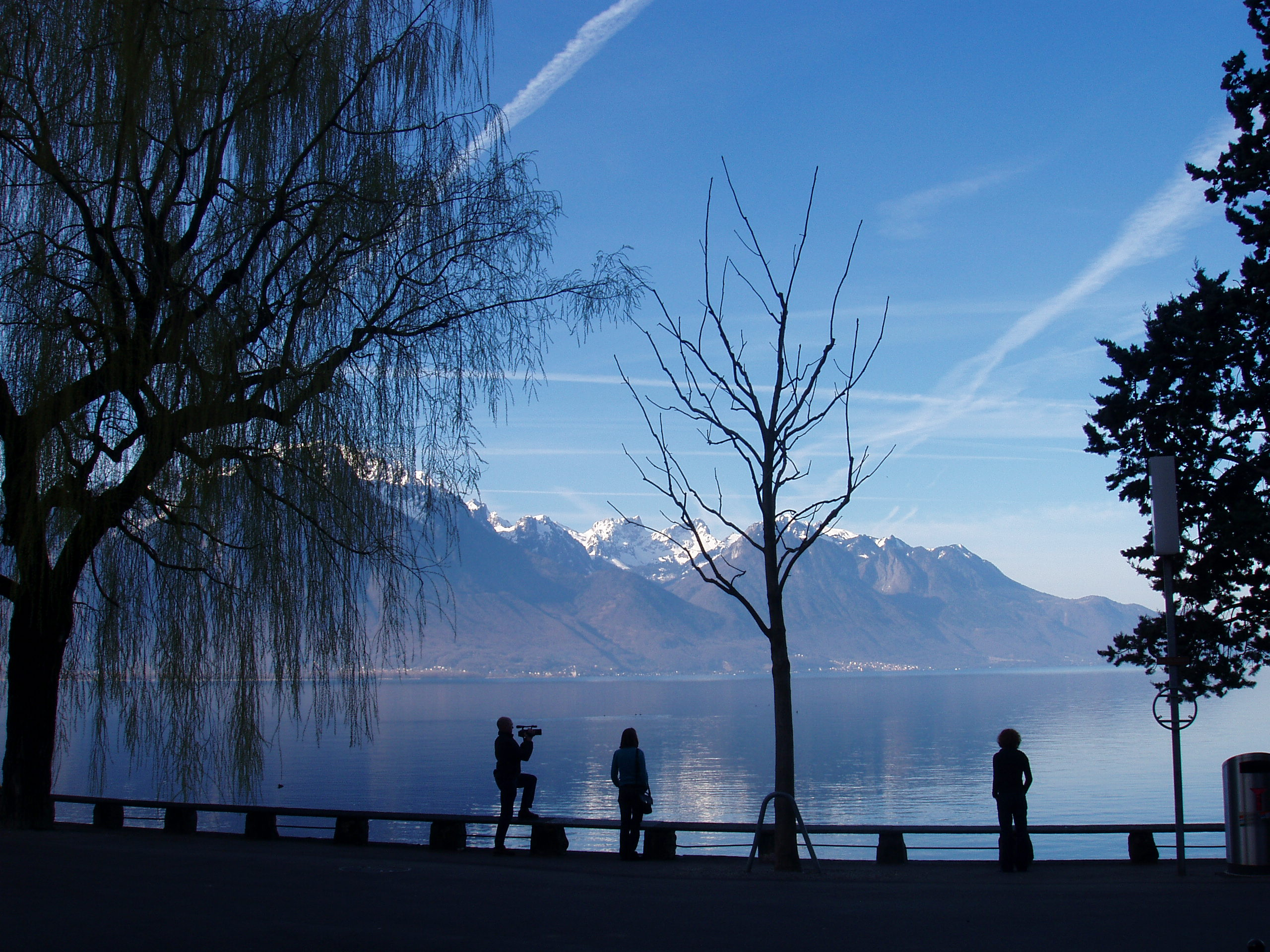
Southwest view over the Lake Geneva from Montreux.

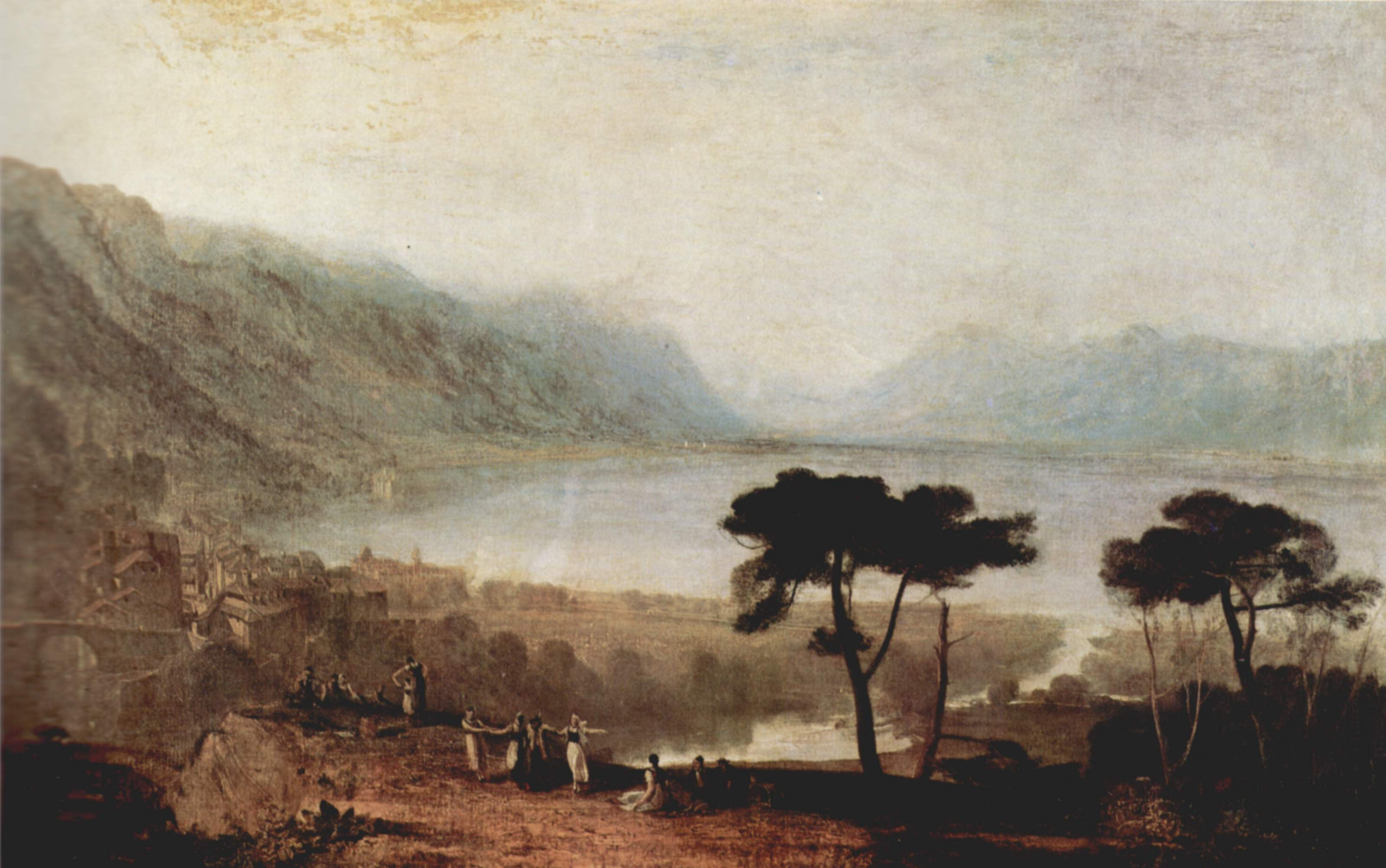
Lake Geneva as seen from Montreux, Joseph Mallord William Turner, 1810

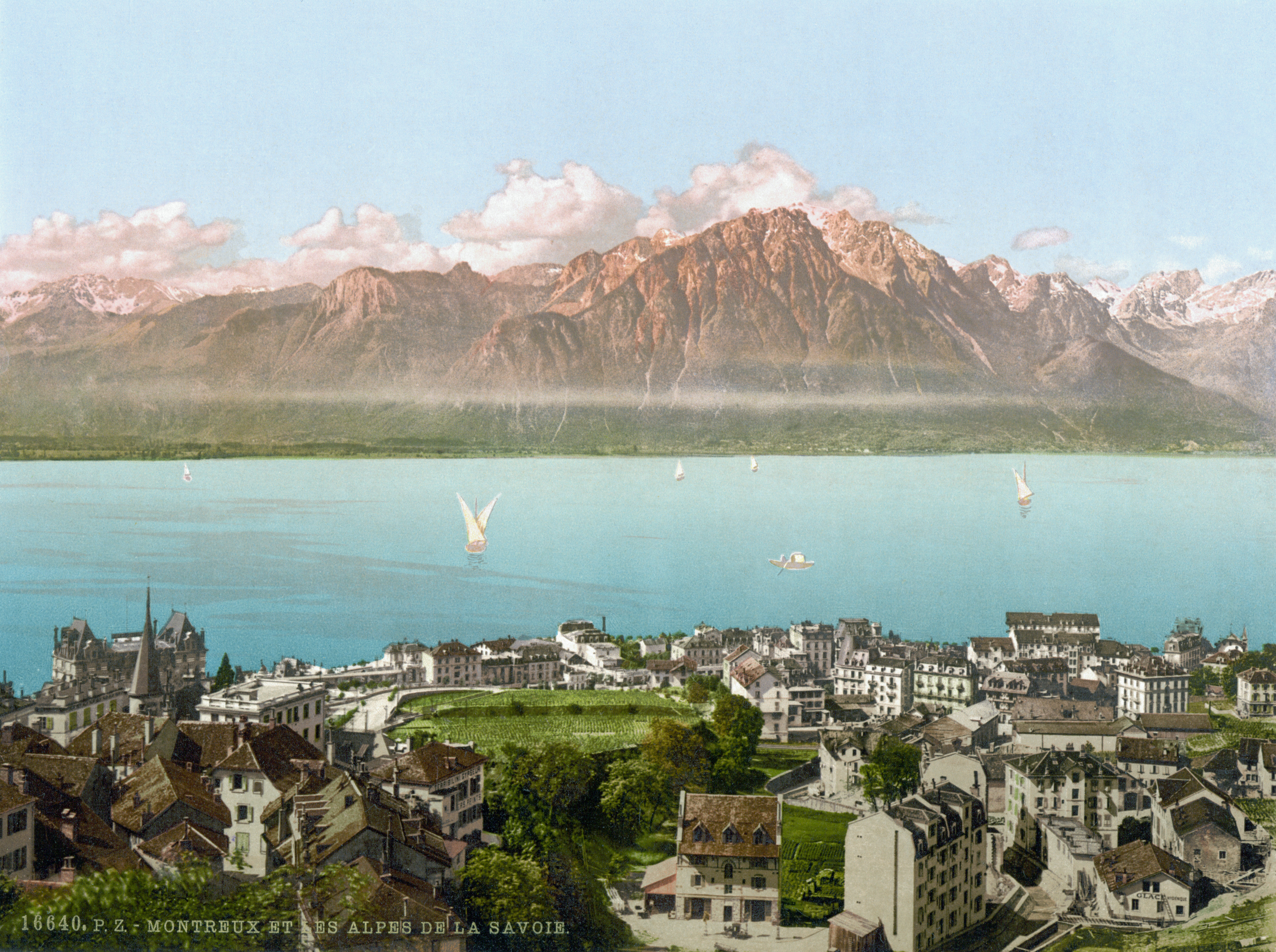
Montreux 1900

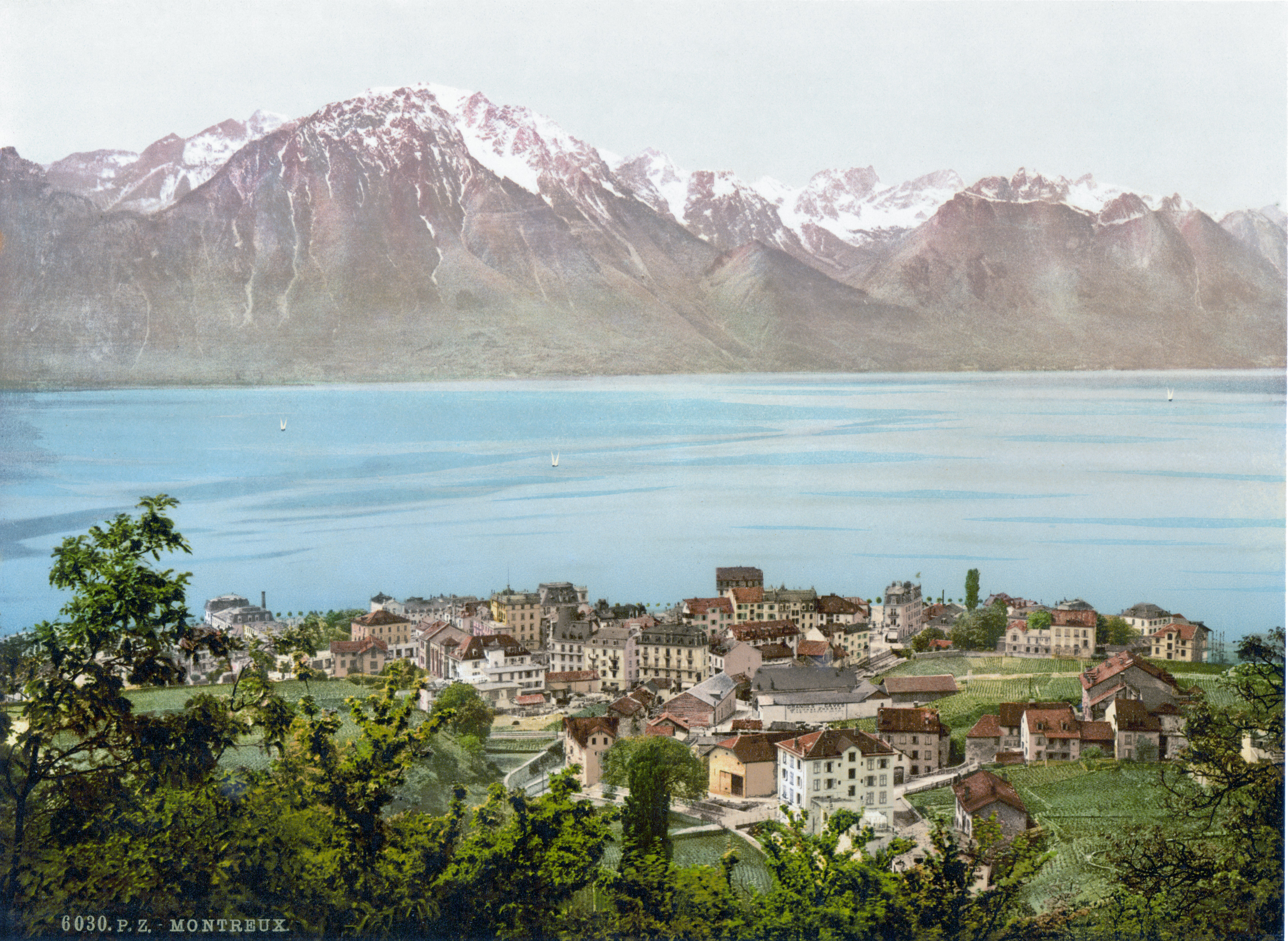
Another angle of Montreux 1900

== See also ==
- 1934 Montreux Fascist conference
- Montreux Convention Regarding the Regime of the Straits
