= Maribel Parra de Mestre =

Venezuelan naval officer (born 1965)

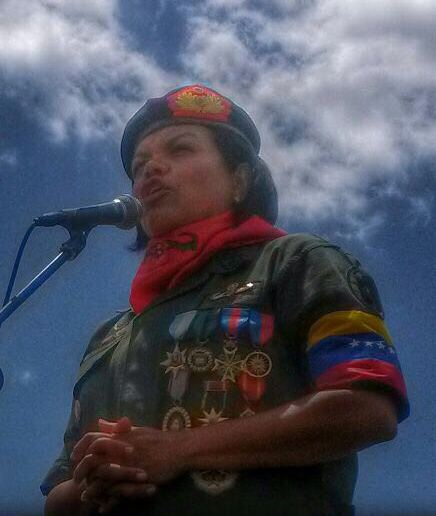
- Parra de Mestre in 2017
- Born: 24 August 1965 (age 61); Maracaibo, Zulia
- Spouse: Amilcar Mestre
- Children: Two daughters: Amibel and Maribel
- Military career
- Allegiance: Venezuela
- Branch: Bolivarian Navy of Venezuela
- Service years: 1982-
- Rank: Vice admiral
- Other work: Vice-president of PDVSA

Maribel del Carmen Parra de Mestre (born 24 August 1965) is a Venezuelan naval officer and oil company executive. She graduated 11th in her class from the Military Academy of the Bolivarian Navy and her naval career included experience in the field of logistics, as an aide to the First Lady of Venezuela and deputy commander of cadets at the navy academy. In 2011 she became the first woman from Zulia to reach the rank of rear admiral and in 2014 was the first Venezuelan woman to be promoted to the rank of vice admiral. A supporter of former president Hugo Chávez, she was appointed by Chavez's successor Nicolás Maduro as executive vice president of the country's state-owned oil company PDVSA in 2017. This was interpreted by some as a takeover of the oil sector by the military.

== Early life and career ==
Maribel Parra de Mestre was born on 24 August 1965 to Guillermo Parra and Ledia Perozo at the Central Hospital in Maracaibo in Zulia. She completed primary and pre-school education at the Simon Rodriguez School and secondary education at the José Ramón Yépez Institute in Zulia. After graduating from high school in June 1982 she chose to enter the Military Academy of the Bolivarian Navy rather than the University of Zulia. She graduated on 5 July 1986, 11th in her class of several hundred.

Parra de Mestre was commissioned as an alférez de navío (approximately equivalent to a sub-lieutenant or lieutenant junior grade) with a specialism in electronics. She completed the marine training course in 1988 and afterwards graduated from the National Experimental University of the Armed Forces with a master's degree and was promoted to the rank of frigate lieutenant. After promotion to the rank of lieutenant she served as an aide to the First Lady of Venezuela. Parra de Mestre was subsequently promoted to frigate captain and travelled to the United States for one year to study at the Western Hemisphere Institute for Security Cooperation. After her return to Venezuela she became deputy commander of the navy academy cadet battalion and, after promotion to the rank of captain, became director of the Navy's supply and commissariat department. She later became head of logistics for the Vargas Infantry Division.

== Admiral ==
Parra de Mestre was promoted to the rank of rear admiral on 5 July 2011, becoming the first woman from Zulia to attain this rank. On 4 July 2014 she became the first Venezuelan woman to achieve the rank of vice admiral when President Nicolás Maduro promoted her to this rank. The next day she became the first woman to lead the combined civil and military parade held annually on the anniversary of the signing of the Venezuelan Declaration of Independence. In 2014 she was appointed president of the heavy transport company of the armed forces.

== Oil company director ==
On 29 January 2017 Parra de Mestre was appointed executive vice president of PDVSA, the Venezuelan state-owned oil company by President Maduro. The move was part of a whole-scale replacement of the company's board of directors an attempt to reduce corruption and strengthen the management of the company as part of Maduro's "Plan Guayana Socialista". The move was seen as part of a takeover of the oil sector in the country by the military. In October 2017 she was assigned by Maduro to develop a security plan for the protection of the oil industry from attacks and its personnel from murder and kidnapping.

== Personal life ==
Parra de Mestre is married to Amilcar Mestre and has two daughters Amibel and Maribel. She was a supporter of former president Hugo Chávez.
