= Karen Akunowicz =

American chef (born 1978)

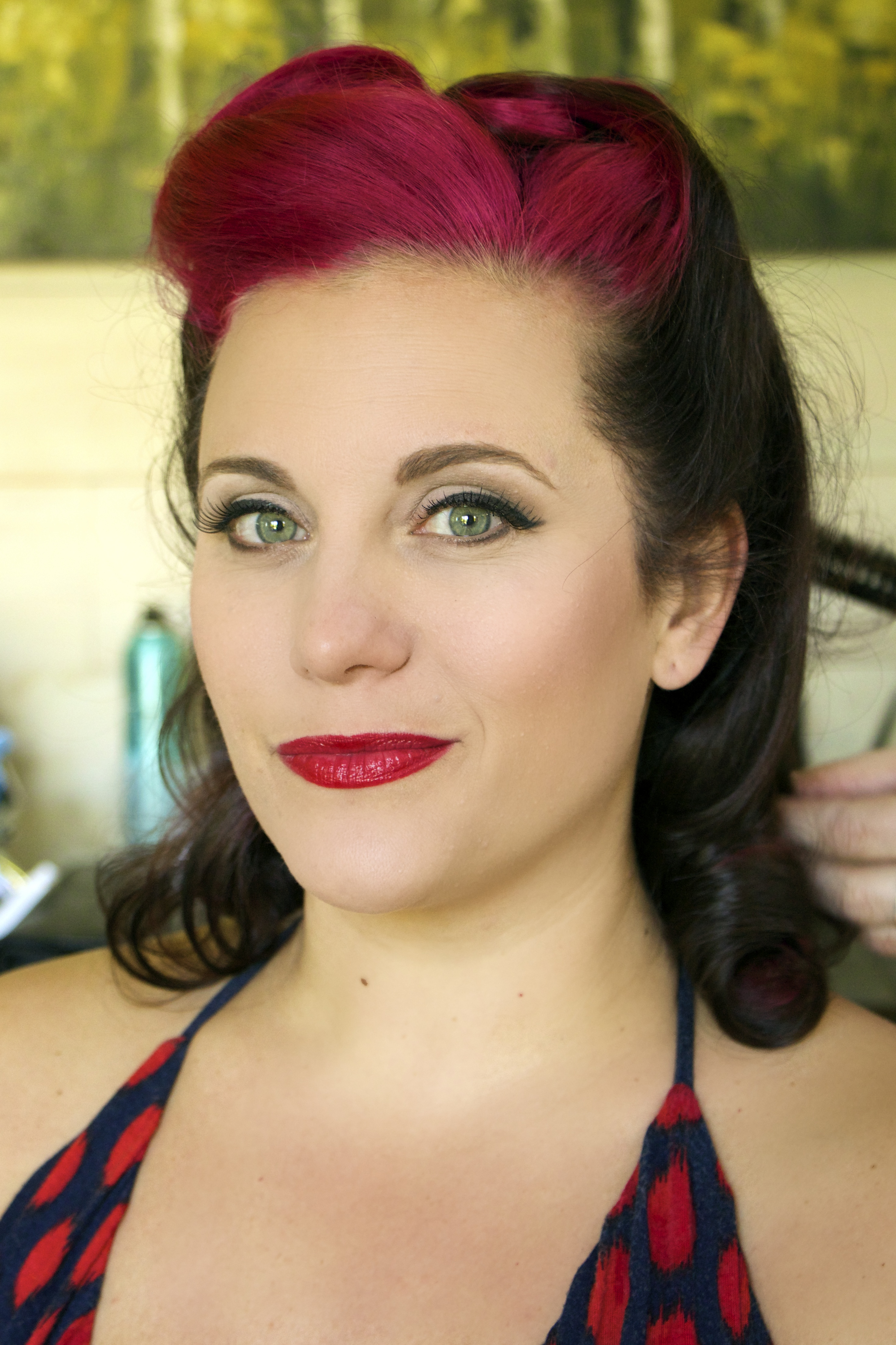
- Born: September 17, 1978 (age 47); Kearny, New Jersey, U.S.
- Education: University of Massachusetts Amherst, Cambridge School of Culinary Arts
- Spouse: LJ Johnson (m. 2014)
- Children: 1
- Culinary career
- Current restaurant(s): Fox & the Knife Boston (2019–present) Bar Volpe, Boston (2021–present) Fox & Flight, Boston (2024–present)
- Previous restaurant: Myers + Chang
- Television show(s): Top Chef: California Top Chef: All-Stars L.A.
- Award(s) won: 2018 James Beard Award, Best Chef: Northeast

Karen Akunowicz (born September 17, 1978) is an American chef in Boston, Massachusetts.

Akunowicz is the chef and proprietor of Fox & the Knife enoteca in Boston, which has been named to several best new restaurants lists. She received a 2018 James Beard Foundation Award for Best Chef: Northeast.

== Early life and education ==
Akunowicz was born and raised in Kearny, New Jersey. She graduated from Kearny High School in 1996.

After graduating from the University of Massachusetts Amherst, she moved to Boston. While waiting tables, Akunowicz considered applying to graduate school for social work, but she decided to go to culinary school instead, attending the Cambridge School of Culinary Arts.

== Career ==
Akunowicz worked at L'Avian Blu in Modena, Italy and at Boston restaurants Via Matta and Oleana before becoming the executive chef and a partner at Joanne Chang's Myers+Chang. She was nominated for a James Beard Award in 2015, and she won the title of Best Chef: Northeast in 2018.

Akunowicz co-authored a cookbook published in 2017, Myers+Chang at Home: Recipes from the Beloved Boston Eatery.

In 2019, Akunowicz opened her own restaurant, Fox & the Knife, an Italian restaurant in South Boston. In 2019, it was named Best New Restaurant in America by Food and Wine Magazine and Eater International and in 2020 by USA Today. Fox & the Knife was also nominated for the James Beard Award for Best New Restaurant in America in 2019 and 2020.

In November 2021, Akunowicz opened her second restaurant, Bar Volpe, in South Boston. It focuses on Southern Italian cuisine.

In March 2024, Akunowicz opened an offshoot of Fox & the Knife, named Fox & Flight, in Boston's Logan International Airport.

== Television appearances ==
In 2014, Akunowicz competed on Beat Bobby Flay (season 1, episode 4), losing to Flay with Chicken & Waffles. In 2015, Akunowicz was a contestant on season 13 of Top Chef. She was a guest judge on Season 6 of Top Chef Canada in 2019. In 2020, Akunowicz competed on Top Chef: All-Stars L.A. In 2022 she competed in Season 3 of Tournament of Champions.

== Personal life ==
Akunowicz identifies as a queer femme. In 2014, she married her partner, LJ Johnson. In late July 2022, Akunowicz announced she was pregnant with her first child. Her daughter was born in September 2022.

== Bibliography ==
- (with Joanne Chang) Myers+Chang At Home: Recipes from the Beloved Boston Eatery (Harvest, 2017) ISBN 9780544836471
- Crave: Bold Recipes That Make You Want Seconds (Countryman Press, 2023) ISBN 9781682687055
