= Fox & the Knife =

Italian restaurant in Boston, Massachusetts, United States

- Interactive map of Fox & the Knife

Restaurant information
- Established: February 4, 2019 (7 years ago)
- Owner: Karen Akunowicz
- Head chef: Karen Akunowicz
- Food type: Italian cuisine
- Rating: Bib Gourmand (2025)
- Location: 28 West Broadway, South Boston, Boston, Massachusetts, United States
- Coordinates: 42°20′33.9871″N 71°3′23.2150″W
- Seating capacity: 80
- Website: www.foxandtheknife.com

Fox & the Knife is a restaurant specializing in Italian cuisine and enoteca, founded on February 4, 2019, by chef Karen Akunowicz, located in the South Boston neighborhood of Boston, the capital of Massachusetts, in the United States.

== History ==
Prior to opening Fox & the Knife, Karen Akunowicz served as executive chef at Myers + Chang alongside Joanne Chang.. The restaurant was influenced by her time in Modena, Italy, where she worked for a year and trained in pasta-making.

Located in the South Boston neighborhood of Boston, Fox & the Knife opened in February 2019 in South Boston, in a space previously occupied by the restaurant Maiden, a restaurant specializing in cheese, charcuterie, and oysters, which closed in 2018.

The name of the restaurant derives from the Italian word “volpe” (meaning “fox”), combined with a reference suggested by Akunowicz’s wife, LJ Johnson.

The restaurant focuses on Italian cuisine, particularly handmade pasta, and operates as an enoteca, offering a wine list with a selection primarily from Italy as well as the United States.

== Reception ==
In 2019, it was named one of the best new restaurants in America by Food & Wine magazine and the food website Eater.

In 2020, it was nominated for the James Beard Foundation Award for Best New Restaurant.

In 2025, the restaurant received the Bib Gourmand award from the Michelin Guide, which recognizes establishments offering good quality and excellent value for money.
