= Chamber of Commerce Building (Baltimore) =

Historic building in Maryland, United States

- U.S. National Register of Historic Places
- Baltimore City Landmark
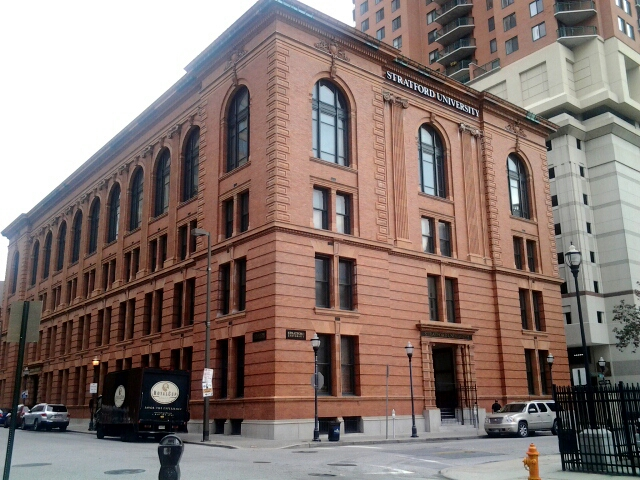
- Chamber of Commerce Building, September 2012
- Interactive map of Chamber of Commerce Building
- Location: 17 Commerce Street, (bounded on east by Custom House Avenue and on the south by Water Street), Baltimore, Maryland
- Coordinates: 39°17′20″N 76°36′36″W
- Area: less than one acre
- Built: 1904
- Architect: Cassell, Charles E. / (John Rudolph Niernsee)
- Architectural style: Renaissance Revival
- NRHP reference No.: 83002929

Significant dates
- Added to NRHP: February 2, 1983
- Designated BCL: 1986

The Chamber of Commerce Building is a historic office building located in Baltimore, Maryland, United States. It is a Renaissance Revival–style of architecture with a brown glazed brick building five floors in height, eleven bays long on the west/east sides, facing Commerce Street on the west and Custom House Avenue to the east. Three bays wide (north/south) on the Water Street side, and rebuilt 1904–1905, using still standing walls/facades. It was built during the rebuilding of the old financial district in Downtown Baltimore following the Great Baltimore Fire of Sunday/Monday, February 7–8, 1904 (third worst conflagration to ever hit an American city), and features many terra cotta decorative elements. The rebuilt structure was designed by Baltimore architect Charles E. Cassell. The original pre-fire building was designed by locally famous and prominent architect John Rudolph Niernsee in 1880 and was used by the old Corn and Flour Exchange, which maintained a trading floor on the fifth level.

It was later occupied during the 1990s by the Baltimore International Culinary College (later renamed the Baltimore International College) as one of their utilized buildings on an urban campus of nearby city blocks and later taken over by Stratford University, a for-profit educational institution. Currently it has been renovated to function as a Staybridge Suites - Baltimore Inner Harbor Hotel.

Chamber of Commerce Building was listed in 1983 on the National Register of Historic Places, maintained by the National Park Service of the U.S. Department of the Interior.
