= Stafford Hotel =

Stafford Hotel may refer to:

- The Stafford Apartments, formerly the Stafford Hotel, a historic building in Baltimore, Maryland, United States
- The Stafford, a hotel in St James's, London, England
