= Cooking school =

Organization that teaches food preparation

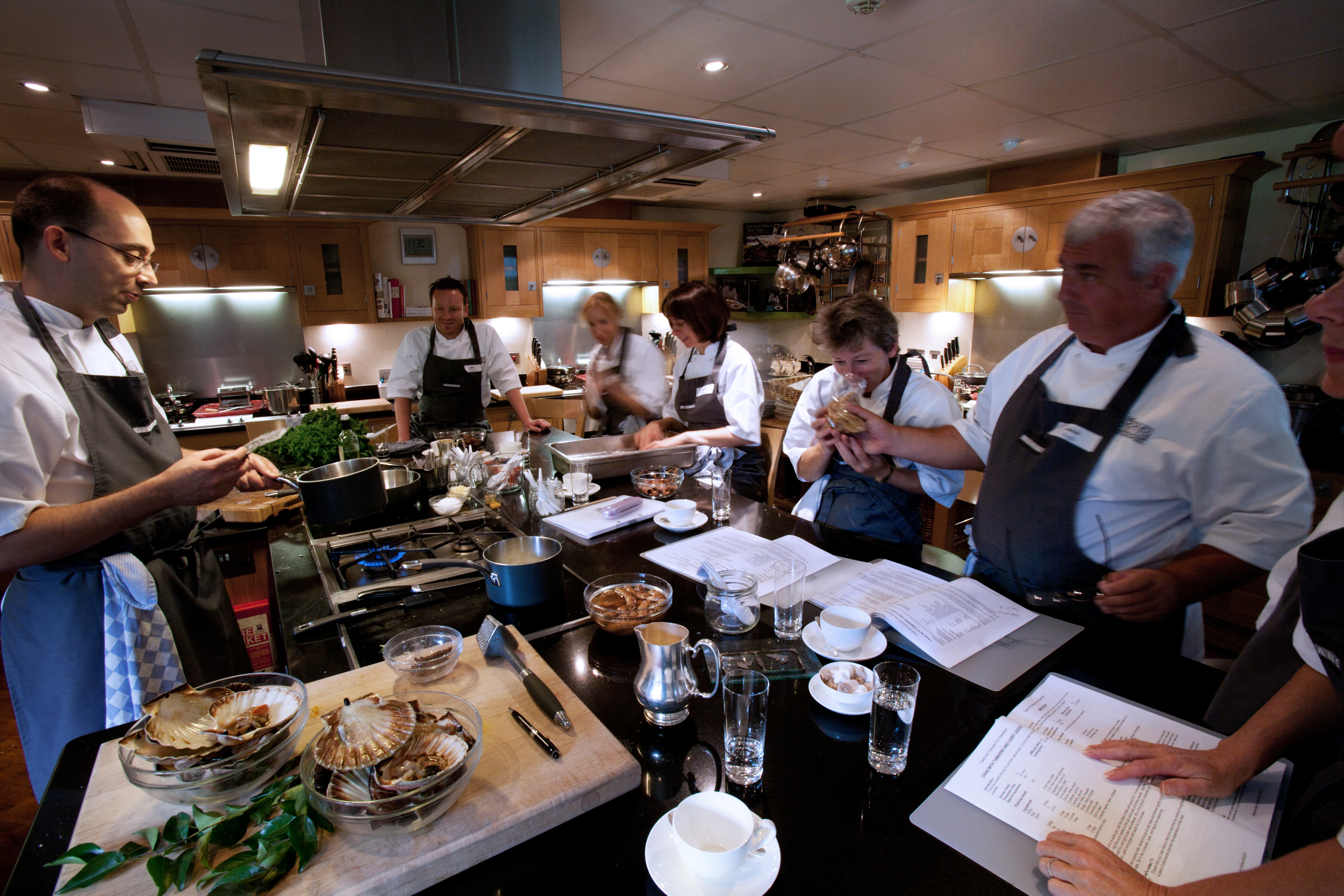
A class at the Raymond Blanc cooking school in Oxford, England

A cooking school (Note: Often referred to as a cookery school, culinary school/college, or catering college.) is an institution devoted to education in the art and science of cooking and food preparation. There are many different types of cooking schools around the world, some devoted to training professional chefs, others aimed at amateur enthusiasts, with some being a mixture of the two. Amateur cooking schools are often intertwined with culinary tourism in many countries. Programs can vary from half a day to several years. Some programs lead to an academic degree or a recognized vocational qualification, while others do not. Many programs include practical experience in the kitchen of a restaurant attached to the school or a period of work experience in a privately owned restaurant.

== History ==
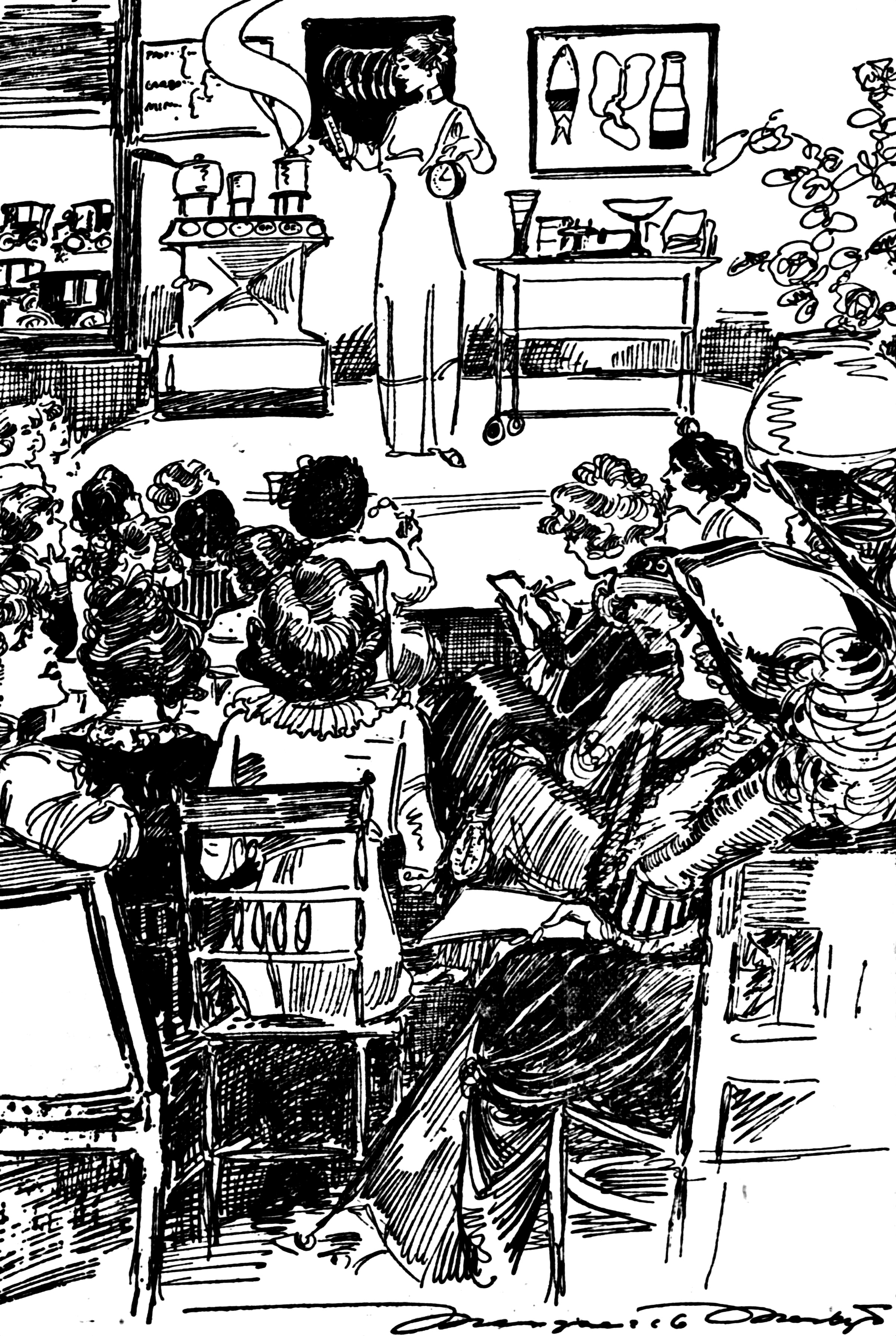
Ana Barrows teaches a cooking class for adults in 1913 St. Louis, Missouri, in this sketch by Marguerite Martyn.

Culinary education in the United States is a fairly new concept in relation to culinary education in Europe. Charles Ranhoffer, chef of the early fine dining restaurant Delmonico's, published a national magazine named "Chef" in 1898 which included one of the first calls to establish a training school for cooks in the United States. Until this point, Ranhoffer had been looking to Europe to solve his staffing problems, however, it began to be too expensive and too much work. In 1911, the United States promoted a system similar to the European one, in which apprentices would have to complete a 6,000-hour work commitment in order to become certified as a chef.

The first significant private cooking school in America was the Boston Cooking School, which was established in 1878, however, one of the most notable was the creation of The Culinary Institute of America in 1946. The Culinary Institute of America brought about a new way to better educate culinary professionals, by teaching students the theory behind their future work and also requiring them to complete an 18-week paid internship at an approved restaurant, requiring them to create at least 51 percent of their product from scratch. The school uses mainly hands-on teaching styles, ensuring that students learn through experience.

360° view of the kitchen from the training restaurant at the Kehtna Vocational Education Center in Kehtna (Estonia).

== Curricula ==
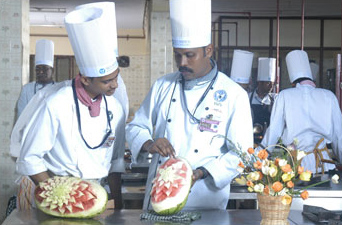
Culinary work at the School of Hotel Management at Vels University in Chennai, India

Some schools, such as Le Cordon Bleu, offer programs through which a chef may demonstrate his or her knowledge and skills and be given certification. Others, such as Baltimore International College, Stratford University, Johnson and Wales University, and the Culinary Institute of America offer programs whereby students gain either an Associate's or Bachelor's degree. There are also a few, such as Ivy Tech Community College of Indiana, Manchester Community College in Connecticut, Los Angeles Trade Technical College in California, or where students receive upon graduation not only an Associate's degree but also certification by the American Culinary Federation, the largest professional chefs' organization in North America.

== Notable culinary colleges ==
- Art Institutes School of Culinary Arts
- Auguste Escoffier School of Culinary Arts
- Baltimore International College
- Cambridge School of Culinary Arts
- Cooking and Hospitality Institute of Chicago
- Culinard, The Culinary Institute of Virginia College
- Culinary Institute Lenôtre
- DCT University Center - Switzerland
- Dusit Thani College, Bangkok
- École Grégoire-Ferrandi
- Institute of Culinary Education
- International Culinary Center
- Johnson & Wales University
- Kendall College - School of Culinary Arts
- Le Cordon Bleu
- Los Angeles Trade Technical College
- New England Culinary Institute
- Niagara Falls Culinary Institute
- Paul Smith's College
- Schoolcraft College
- Stratford University
- Sullivan University
- The Culinary Institute of America
- Western Culinary Institute

== See also ==
- Culinary tourism
- Vocational education
- Vocational school
