= Vino Versum Poysdorf =

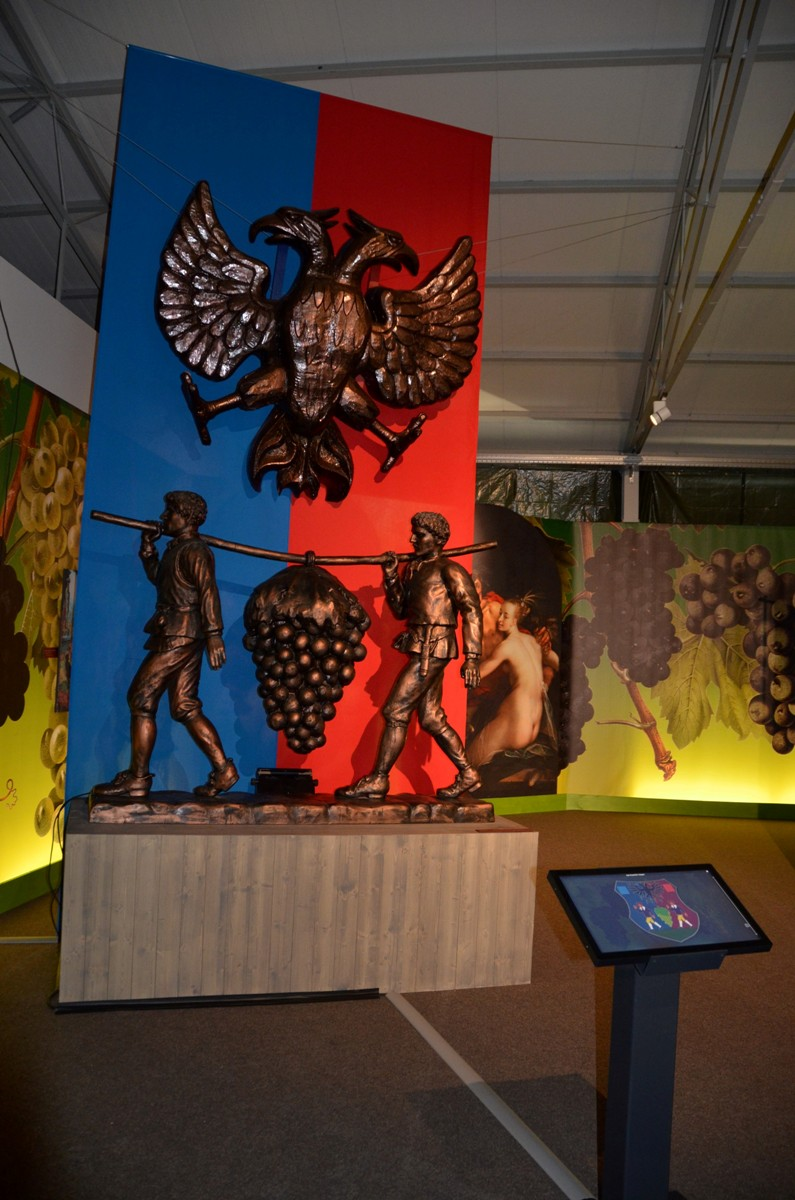
- Statues of the messengers, symbols of Poysdorf. Interactive coat of arms in the Hall of Grapes.
- Established: 2014
- Location: Poysdorf, Lower Austria, Austria
- Coordinates: 48.67124°N 16.62911°E
- Website: Official website

The Vino Versum Poysdorf is a municipal museum dedicated to the wine and culture history of Poysdorf and the Weinviertel ("wine quarter").

== History ==
Poysdorf is a center of wine growing in Austria with 500 Hectare vineyards. The wine growing tradition goes back to the Middle Ages and was first mentioned in 1338. 1582 the then village received a market right and developed huge wealth through growing and trading wine. 1910 a first municipal museum was established, 1978 it was reopened in the city's old almshouse. 2013 the Lower Austria Provincial Exhibition took place in Poysdorf, 4 million Euros were invested in the enlargement and renovation of the museums area. In April 2014 a new designed permanent exhibition was reopened with the name Vino Versum Poysdorf.

== Buildings ==
The main building is a former almshouse, built in 1653. 1664 a baroque chapel, dedicated to St. Barbara, was added. The building is surrounded by an open-air area with vineyards, press houses with cellars and a barn with an exhibition about the development of wine presses. A historic wine cellar, passing under a highway, connects the old almshouse and open air area with a plaza, surrounded by a contemporary exhibition building, the Hall of Grapes, and an adapted vintner´s house with a vinothek, souvenir shop and visitor center.

== Gallery ==
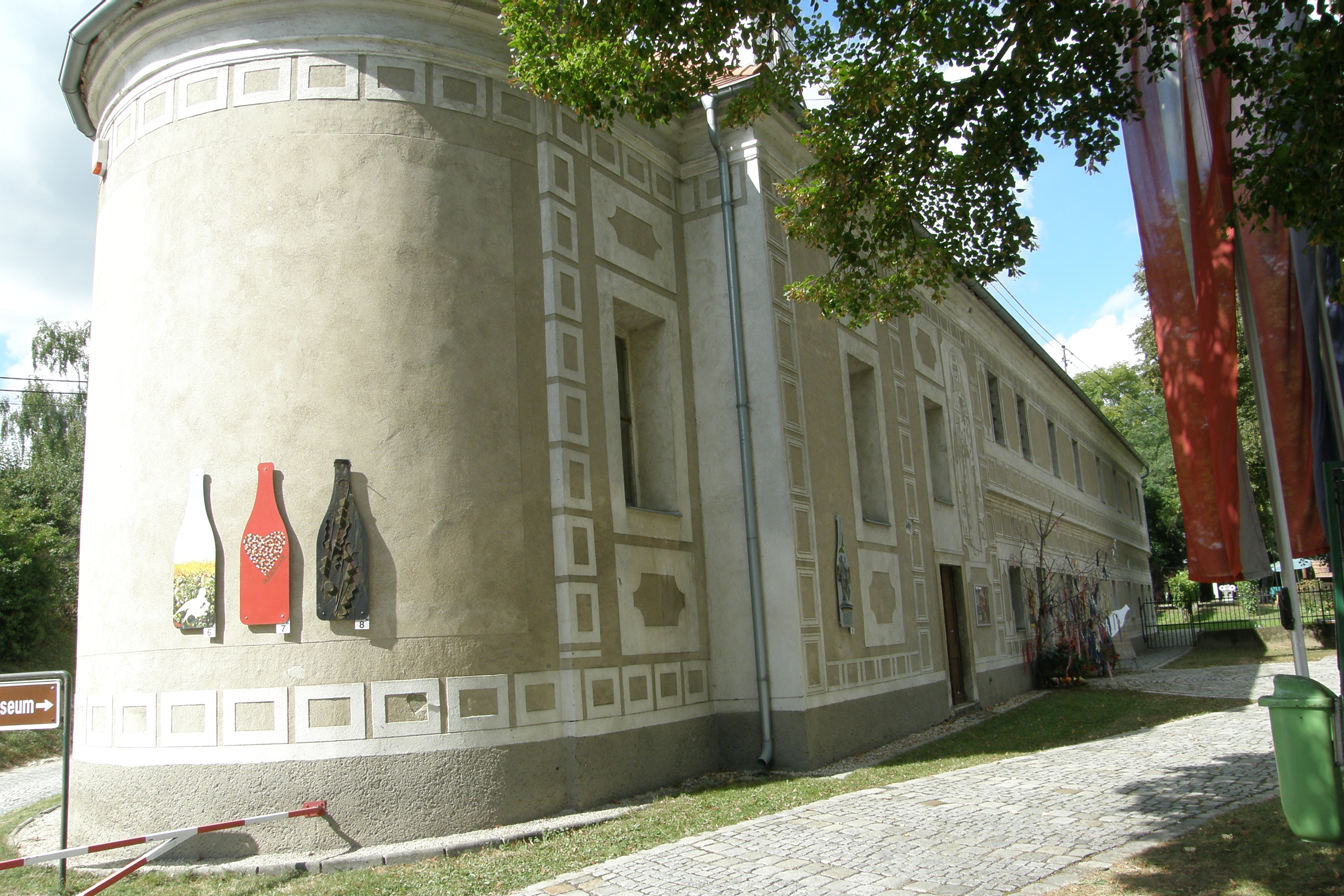
Facade of the 17th century almshouse, now part of the Vino Versum.

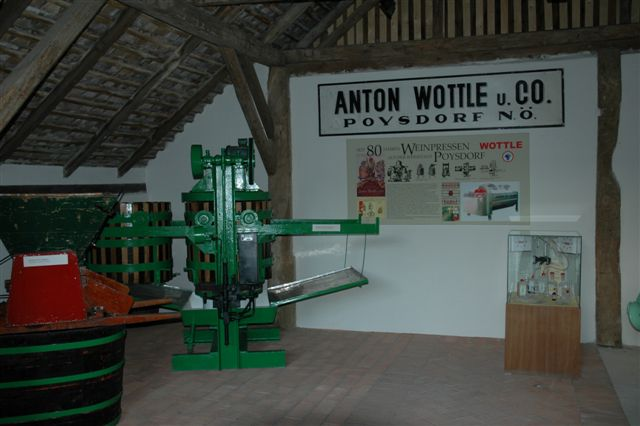
Exhibition of historic wine presses.

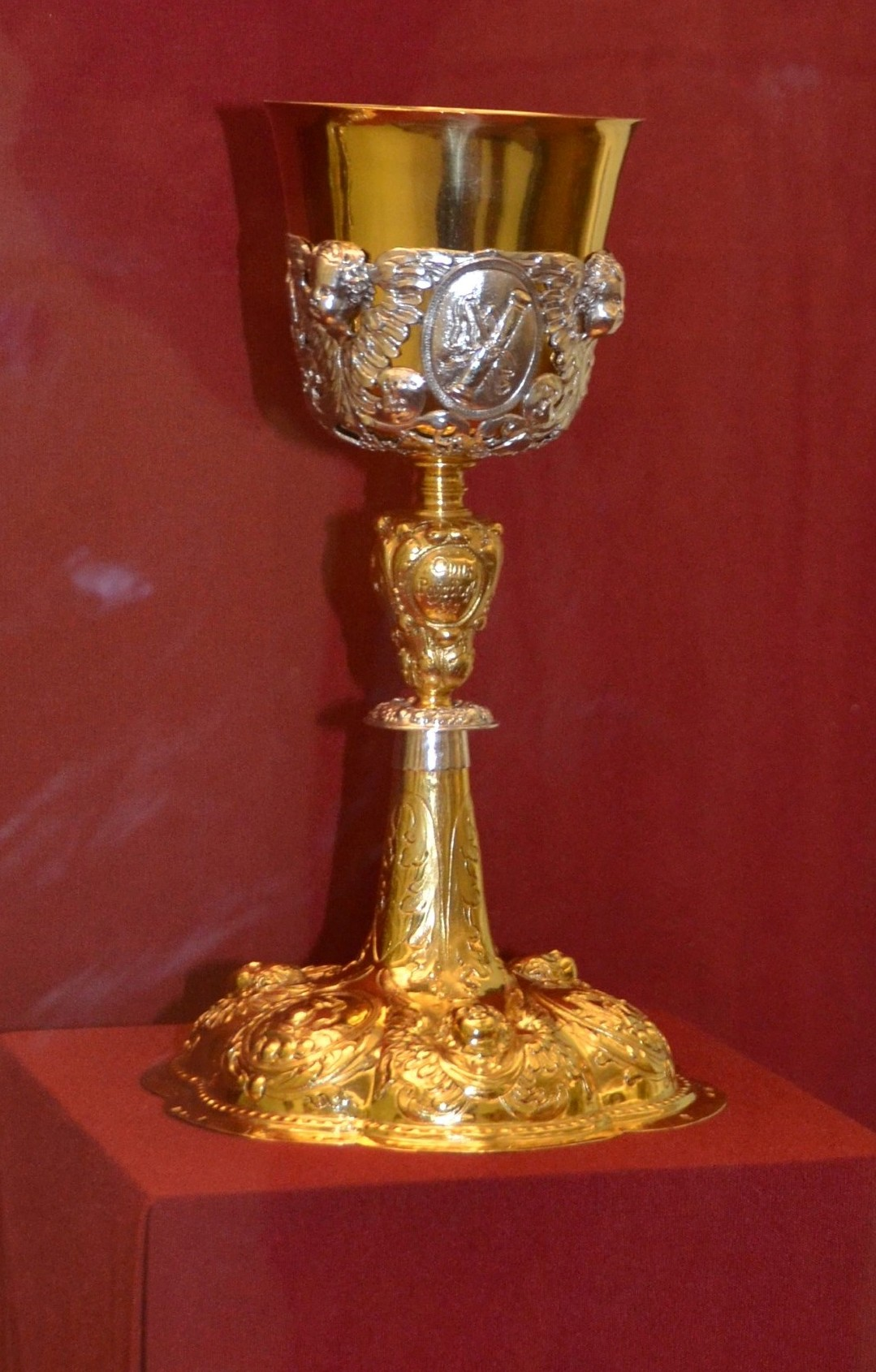
Gilded silver chalice, Augsburg 1696.

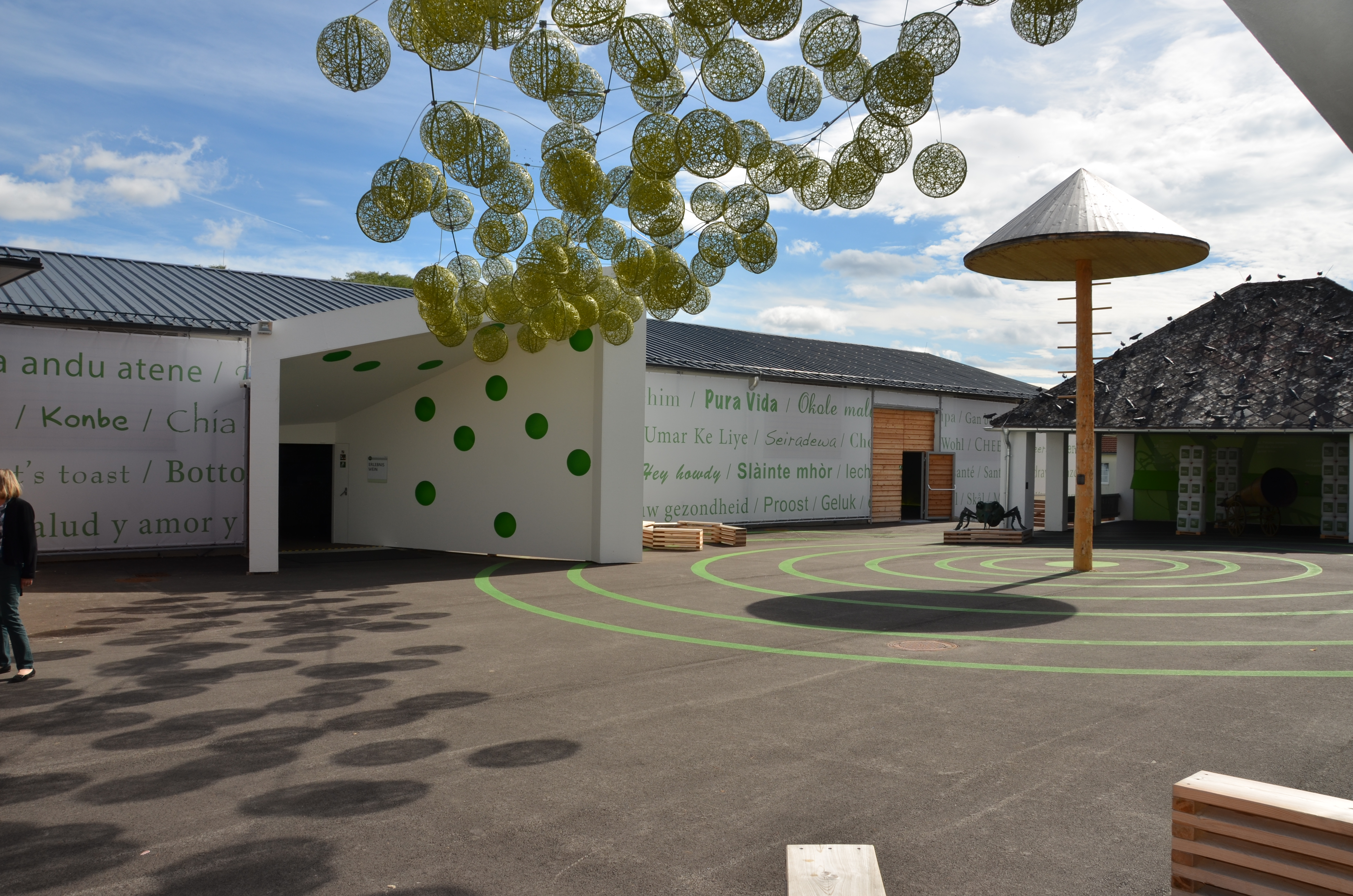
Plaza with Hall of Grapes.

== See also ==
- List of food and beverage museums
