= Wellness in the Schools =

American nonprofit organization

Wellness in the Schools is a nonprofit organization that promotes healthy eating, environmental awareness and fitness for children in American public schools. It is led by volunteer chef Bill Telepan, a Manhattan restaurateur.

== History ==
In 2005, Nancy Easton and Bill Telepan founded Wellness in the Schools as a 501(c)(3) Public Charity. The organization launched its first official program in 2007 across three public New York City schools. Their programming began national expansions in 2011. As of 2025, the organization works with schools in seven different states.

== Programs ==
The organization runs three programs: Cook for Kids, which recruits culinary school graduates to work with cafeteria workers to provide fresh meals for children; Green for Kids, which promotes the use of environmentally safe cleaning products in schools; and Coach for Kids, which trains coaches to encourage children to participate in physical activities and reduce playground bullying.

In 2019 Wellness in the Schools collaborated with Life Time Foundation to found Scratchworks, an organization focused culinary mentorship programs and school lunch advocacy in the United States.
