= The Stafford Apartments =

- Stafford Hotel
- U.S. National Historic Landmark District – Contributing property
- Location within Baltimore
- Location: 716 N. Washington Pl; Baltimore, Maryland 21201
- Coordinates: 39.298420°N 76.616041°W
- Built: 1894
- Architect: Charles E. Cassell
- Architectural style: Richardsonian Romanesque
- Part of: Mount Vernon Place Historic District (ID71001037)
- Designated NHLDCP: November 11, 1971

The Stafford Hotel, now The Stafford Apartments, is a historic building in Baltimore, Maryland which was constructed in 1894. The Stafford Hotel building was the tallest building on Mount Vernon Place at the time of its inception. It was designed by architect Charles E. Cassell (1838–1916), who was a founding member of the AIA Baltimore chapter, and also designed the Christian Science Temple, Chamber of Commerce building, and Stewart's Department Store in Baltimore. The building itself is clad in brown Roman brick, and features arched windows and balustrade balconies – all of which is done in the Richardsonian/Romanesque architectural style.

The building is located on the north face of Mount Vernon Place, a cross-shaped park composed of 4 landscaped squares, featuring the Washington Monument at its center. The park itself is located in the heart of Baltimore's historic district, and many of the most historically and architecturally significant structures in Baltimore line its sides. Mount Vernon Place represents Baltimore's history and development during the 19th and 20th centuries, and can be seen as the finest surviving example of Maryland's 19th century urban planning efforts.

The hotel opened on November 5, 1894, and was considered the grandest hotel in all of Baltimore. The hotel opened with highly decorated halls, foyer, dining rooms, a bar, a café, a ladies reception, a drawing room, smoking rooms, lounges, a barber, a coatroom, a newsstand, offices, a writing room, private dining rooms, reception rooms, 140 bedrooms, 30 private parlors in suites (with 80 baths among the suites on the upper floors), a basement finished in marble, and a central rotunda featuring an open curved stair illuminated by a large rooftop skylight. It was preferred by the famous and wealthy while visiting Baltimore. F. Scott Fitzgerald is even known to have resided in the hotel from 1935-1936.

Throughout the years the hotel received numerous renovations, and in 1968 the building was sold at auction. At the time of sale, it had 117 guest rooms.

It is a contributing building in the Mount Vernon Place Historic District, a U.S. National Historic Landmark District designated in 1971.

Today, The Stafford is a 96-unit apartment building; housing primarily students from the nearby Johns Hopkins University's Peabody Institute. While it is owned by the university, it is managed and leased by LandMark Property Management, Inc. In 2016, Stafford Capital Partners, LLC, an investment group led by Luis A. Cozza purchased the leasehold interest in The Stafford from Apartment Investment and Management Company (AIMCO). The community consists of studios, 1-bedroom, and 2-bedroom apartments, that range from 390 sq ft (36 m^{2}) to 696 sq ft (64.7 m^{2}). Community amenities include a fitness center, laundry facility, and common room. While the interior has been recently renovated, the historic exterior is very much intact and in good condition.

== Gallery ==
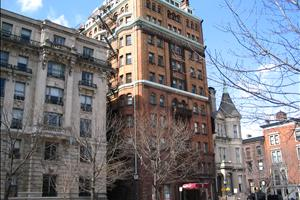
The Stafford facade

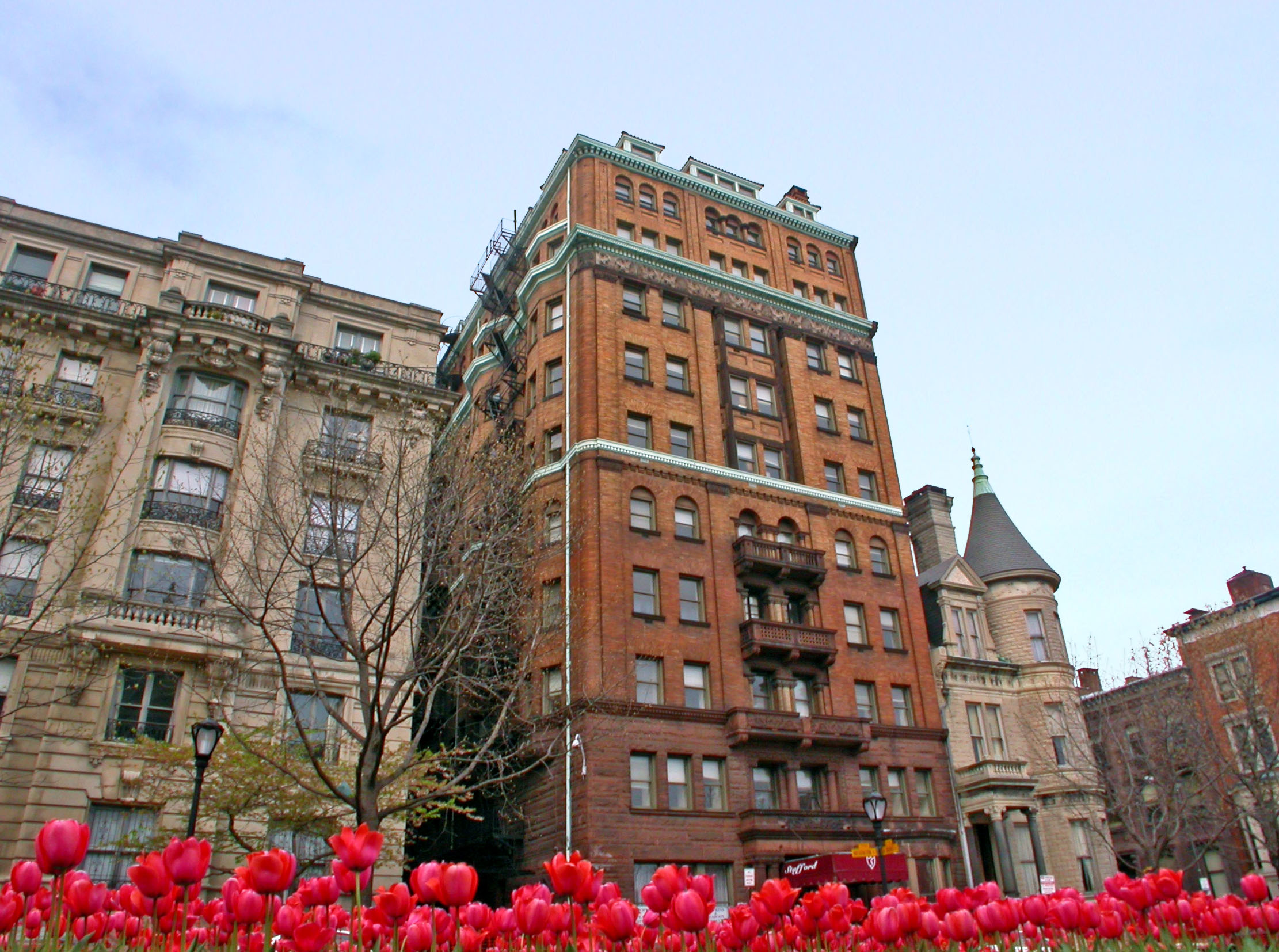
The facade of the historic Stafford apartment building
