= Auguste Escoffier School of Culinary Arts =

Culinary school in the United States

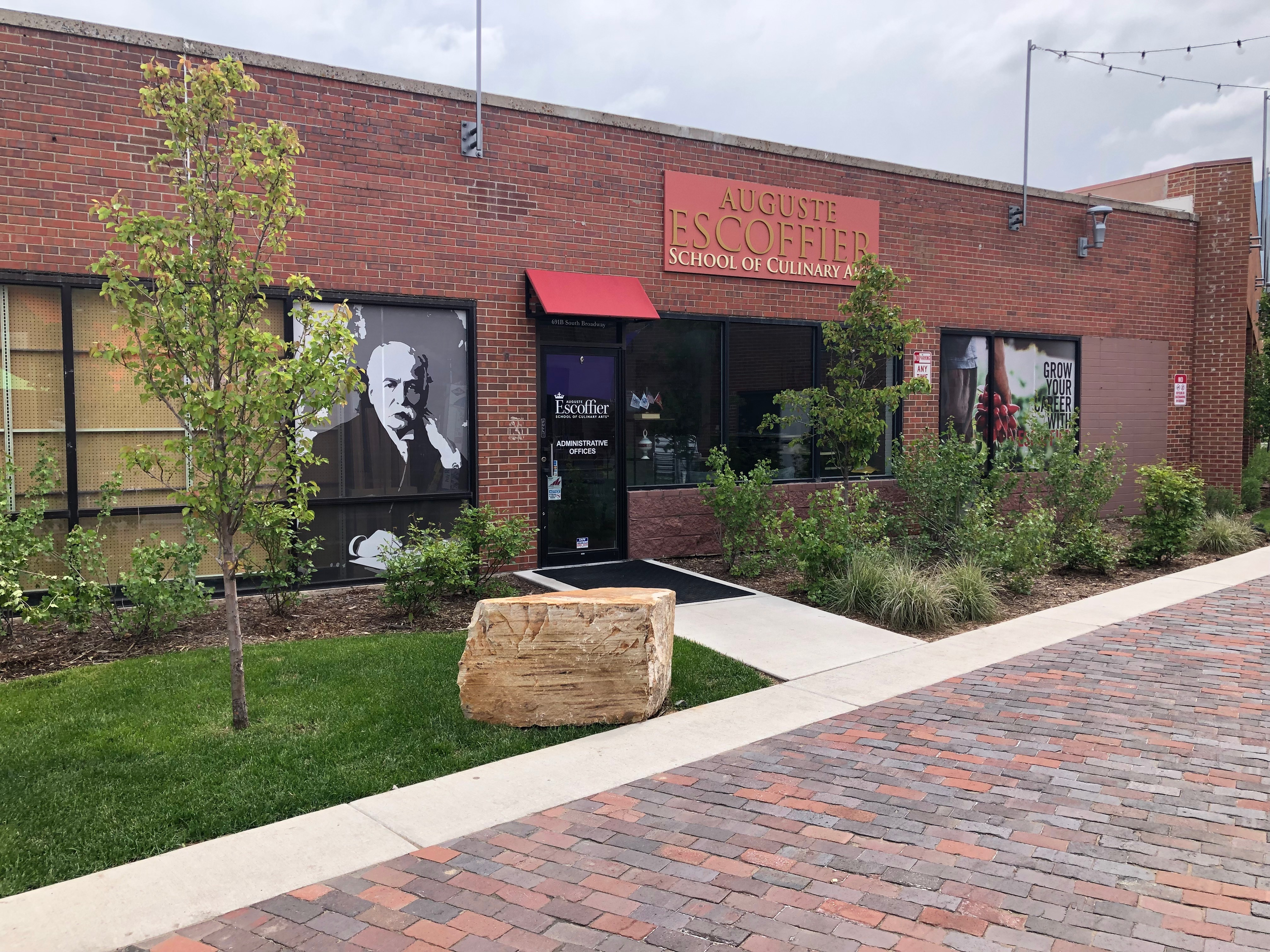
- Former names: Culinary School of the Rockies (1991–2010), Culinary Academy of Austin (1999–2010)
- Type: Private culinary school
- Established: 2010
- Parent institution: Triumph Higher Education Group LLC
- Accreditation: COE (Austin), ACFEFAC (both campuses)
- President: John M. Larson
- Provost: Kirk T. Bachmann
- Academic staff: 108
- Students: 8,943
- Location: Boulder, Colorado and Austin, Texas, United States
- Campus: Urban
- Website: www.escoffier.edu

Auguste Escoffier School of Culinary Arts is a private culinary school with campuses in Boulder, Colorado, Austin, Texas, and online. The school offers culinary arts, pastry arts, hospitality, food entrepreneurship, holistic nutrition and wellness, and plant-based programs. It is named after Auguste Escoffier, a French chef who the Tampa Bay Times calls "the father of modern haute cuisine", and owned by Triumph Higher Education group.

== History ==
Auguste Escoffier School of Culinary Arts was established in 2010 by Triumph Higher Education Group in partnership with the Auguste Escoffier Foundation. To launch the school, Triumph acquired two existing institutions: the Culinary Academy of Austin in Texas (founded in 1999) and the Culinary School of the Rockies (CSR) in Boulder, Colorado (founded as Cooking School of the Rockies by Joan Brett in 1991). These campuses were merged and rebranded under the Escoffier name in honor of French chef Georges Auguste Escoffier (1846–1935), who has been described as "the father of modern haute cuisine" and is known for creating the kitchen brigade system and codifying the French mother sauces, among other contributions to the culinary arts.

The school's official launch took place in October 2010 at a reception in Chicago, featuring Michel Escoffier (Auguste's great-grandson and president of the Auguste Escoffier Foundation) delivering remarks. By mid-2011, the transformation of the Boulder campus was complete: the facility received an updated façade and new professional kitchens, and the program was revamped around Escoffier's methods and standards.

== Campuses ==
The school operates two physical campuses, one in Boulder, Colorado, and one in Austin, Texas. The school also has online programs offered through the Boulder campus.

=== Boulder Campus ===
The Boulder campus is located at 637 South Broadway in Boulder. This campus originated as the Cooking School of the Rockies (CSR) in 1991, becoming part of the Auguste Escoffier School of Culinary Arts in 2010. The original CSR curriculum featured a focus on fresh, locally produced ingredients, which remains a focus of the Escoffier Farm to Table curriculum. The Boulder campus advertises programs in study areas such as culinary, baking & pastry, and plant-based culinary arts.

=== Austin Campus ===
The Austin campus is located at 6020 Dillard Circle in Austin, Texas. Formerly known as the Culinary Academy of Austin (established in 2001), it became an Escoffier campus in 2010 as part of Triumph's expansion. The Austin campus advertises diploma and associate degree programs in culinary and pastry arts.

=== Online Programs ===
Administered through the Boulder campus, the school advertises diploma and associate degree programs in culinary arts, pastry arts, and other specializations.

== Organization and administration ==
The school is a private, for-profit institution owned by Triumph Higher Education Group LLC. According to the school, John M. Larson, the company's founder, serves as its president and CEO. Kirk T. Bachmann is president of the Boulder campus and serves as provost. Marcus McMellon is president of the Austin campus.

As of fall 2023, the Boulder Campus (including online programs) reported 101 full-time and 12 part-time faculty members and the Austin Campus reported 12 full-time and 7 part-time faculty members.

== Academics ==
Auguste Escoffier School of Culinary Arts advertises programs in culinary arts, pastry arts, plant-based culinary arts, food entrepreneurship, holistic nutrition and wellness, and hospitality and restaurant operations management.

=== Accreditation ===
Escoffier's Boulder Campus (including online programs) is accredited by the Accrediting Council for Continuing Education and Training (ACCET). The campus and online programs are also approved and regulated by the Colorado Department of Higher Education (CDHE), Division of Private Occupational Schools. The campus' residential Diploma in Pastry Arts, Diploma in Culinary Arts, and Associate Degree in Culinary Arts programs are accredited by the American Culinary Federation Educational Foundation Accrediting Commission.

Escoffier's Austin Campus is accredited by the Council on Occupational Education (COE).

=== Associations and affiliations ===
Auguste Escoffier School of Culinary Arts Boulder Leadership is a member of the International Association of Culinary Professionals (IACP). The school is also a member of the World Association of Chefs Societies (WACS) and the National Restaurant Association (NRA).

The school is also affiliated with the Auguste Escoffier Foundation and Le Musée Escoffier de l'Art Culinaire in France, and, as of May 2023, offers a study-abroad program in France via an academic partnership with École Ducasse, a culinary school named for Michelin-starred chef Alain Ducasse.

=== Enrollment and admissions ===
As of 2023, the Boulder campus (including online) enrolled 8,571 students. The Austin campus enrolled 372 students.
