= Poysdorf =

- Municipality
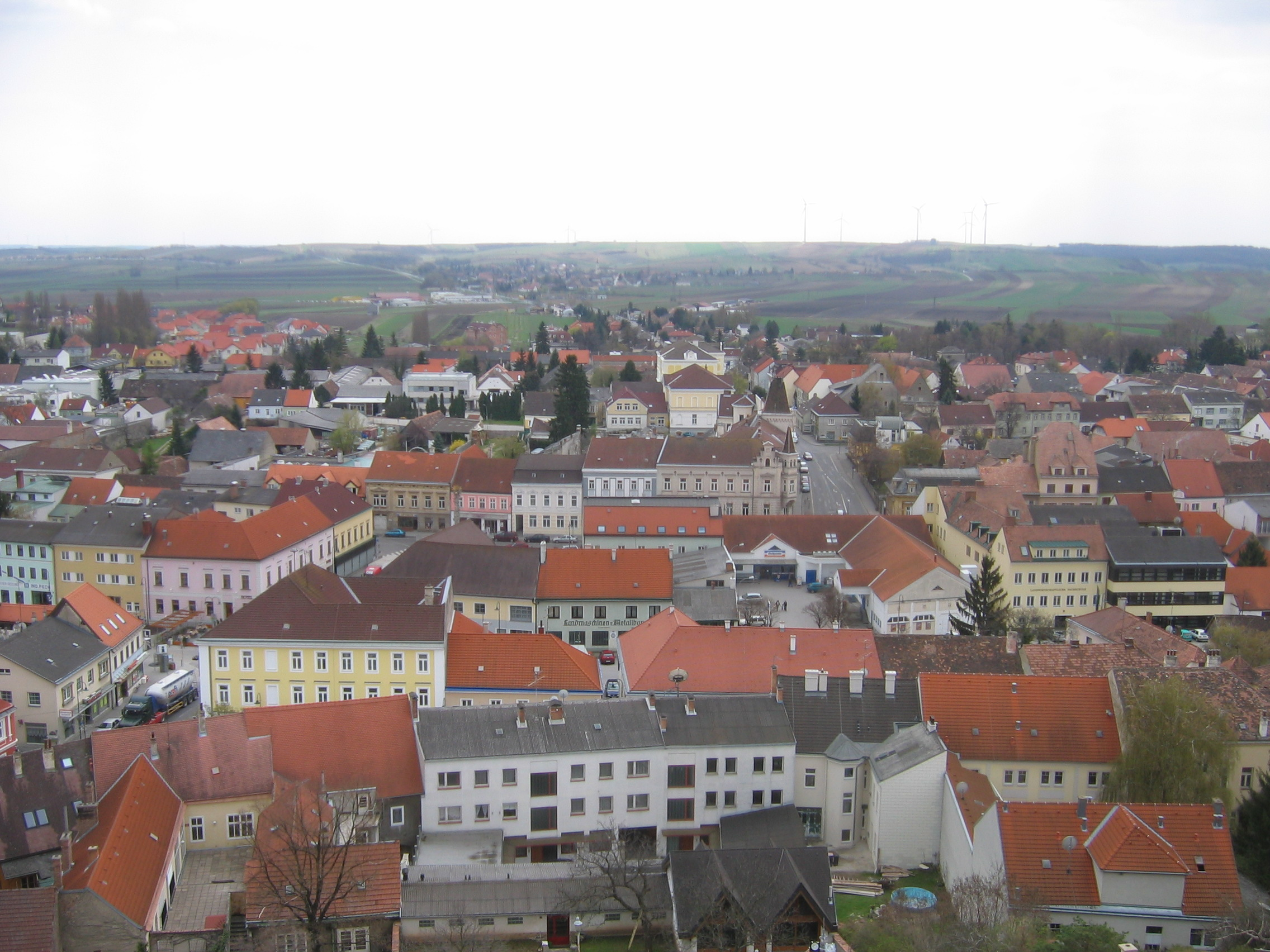
- Panorama of Poysdorf

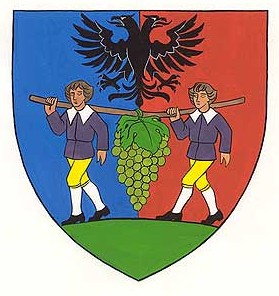
- Coat of arms

- Location within Austria
- Coordinates: 48°40′N 16°36′E
- Country: Austria
- State: Lower Austria
- District: Mistelbach

Government
  - Mayor: Gudrun Sperner-Habitzl (ÖVP)

Area
  - Total: 97.26 km^{2} (37.55 sq mi)
- Elevation: 225 m (738 ft)

Population (2018-01-01)
  - Total: 5,527
  - Density: 56.83/km^{2} (147.2/sq mi)
- Time zone: UTC+1 (CET)
  - Summer (DST): UTC+2 (CEST)
- Postal code: 2170
- Area code: 02552
- Website: www.poysdorf.at

Poysdorf is a town in the district of Mistelbach in the Austrian state of Lower Austria.

== Population ==
Historical population
Year	Pop.	±%
1869	7,071	—
1880	7,524	+6.4%
1890	7,836	+4.1%
1900	8,006	+2.2%
1910	8,238	+2.9%
1923	7,744	−6.0%
1934	8,074	+4.3%
1939	8,257	+2.3%
1951	7,715	−6.6%
1961	6,785	−12.1%
1971	6,159	−9.2%
1981	5,641	−8.4%
1991	5,447	−3.4%
2001	5,606	+2.9%
2011	5,498	−1.9%

== Sights ==
- Vino Versum Poysdorf, a museum about wine and the history of Poysdorf as one of the leading wine towns in Austria.

== Climate ==
Climate data for Poysdorf 1981-2010
Month	Jan	Feb	Mar	Apr	May	Jun	Jul	Aug	Sep	Oct	Nov	Dec	Year
Record high °C (°F)	17.7 (63.9)	18.4 (65.1)	24.2 (75.6)	27.3 (81.1)	33.2 (91.8)	37.1 (98.8)	37.1 (98.8)	38.4 (101.1)	31.5 (88.7)	27.5 (81.5)	20.4 (68.7)	15.2 (59.4)	38.4 (101.1)
Mean daily maximum °C (°F)	2.1 (35.8)	4.4 (39.9)	9.6 (49.3)	15.9 (60.6)	21 (70)	24 (75)	26.7 (80.1)	26.3 (79.3)	20.8 (69.4)	14.6 (58.3)	7.5 (45.5)	2.7 (36.9)	14.6 (58.3)
Daily mean °C (°F)	−1.2 (29.8)	0.2 (32.4)	4.5 (40.1)	9.9 (49.8)	15.1 (59.2)	18.1 (64.6)	20.3 (68.5)	19.6 (67.3)	14.6 (58.3)	9.2 (48.6)	4 (39)	−0.1 (31.8)	9.5 (49.1)
Mean daily minimum °C (°F)	−3.9 (25.0)	−2.8 (27.0)	0.7 (33.3)	4.6 (40.3)	9.3 (48.7)	12.3 (54.1)	14.1 (57.4)	13.9 (57.0)	10.1 (50.2)	5.6 (42.1)	1.4 (34.5)	−2.5 (27.5)	5.2 (41.4)
Record low °C (°F)	−27.4 (−17.3)	−23.8 (−10.8)	−17 (1)	−6.4 (20.5)	−1 (30)	0.7 (33.3)	1.5 (34.7)	5 (41)	0.5 (32.9)	−7.4 (18.7)	−14.4 (6.1)	−23 (−9)	−27.4 (−17.3)
Average precipitation mm (inches)	30 (1.2)	30 (1.2)	42 (1.7)	37 (1.5)	64 (2.5)	65 (2.6)	67 (2.6)	58 (2.3)	58 (2.3)	32 (1.3)	41 (1.6)	39 (1.5)	562 (22.1)
Average snowfall cm (inches)	12 (4.7)	10 (3.9)	5 (2.0)	0 (0)	0 (0)	0 (0)	0 (0)	0 (0)	0 (0)	0 (0)	3 (1.2)	10 (3.9)	41 (16)
Average relative humidity (%) (at 14:00)	75.9	66.8	59	50.6	52.3	53	49.9	48.7	55	61.6	73.5	79.1	60.4
Mean monthly sunshine hours	61	95	139	199	239	235	256	248	179	132	63	46	1,893
Source: Central Institute for Meteorology and Geodynamics
