= Steve DiFillippo =

American Restaurateur

- Born: 1961 (age 64–65); Springfield, MA
- Occupations: Restaurateur and owner of Davio's restaurant group
- Spouse: Pamela DiFillippo
- Website: Davio's Northern Italian Steakhouse

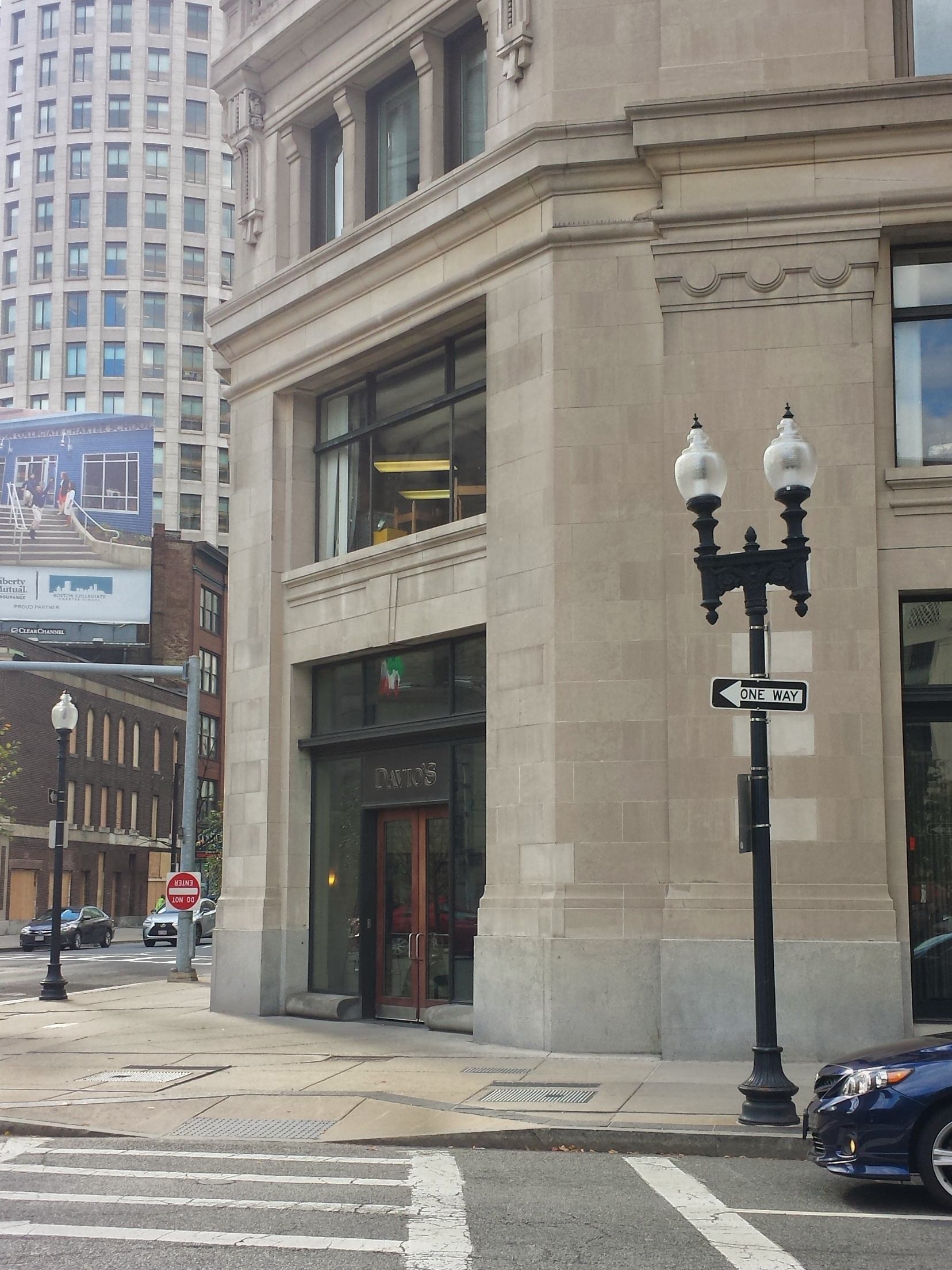
Davio's in Boston, Massachusetts

Steve DiFillippo is a restaurateur and owner of the Davio’s restaurant group located in Atlanta, Boston, Philadelphia, Foxborough and the Avila’s restaurant in Boston. He is also the creator of a retail product line of spring rolls under the Davio’s brand.

== Education ==
Steve DiFillippo graduated from Boston University in 1982 and attended The Cambridge School of Culinary Arts. During his college years, DiFillippo filled multiple roles at the SeaSide restaurant in Boston and finally assumed the executive chef position once he graduated from culinary school.

== Restaurants and business ventures ==
In 1985, DiFillippo purchased an existing restaurant named Davio’s. The original Davio’s was opened in 1977 as a family-owned Italian restaurant. DiFillippo retooled the menu, the space, and the wine list to better suit his own culinary heritage.

DiFillippo opened Davio’s Philadelphia in 1999. At this location, he introduced an open kitchen concept and added an in-house bakery which produces all of Davio’s breads, desserts and homemade ice cream.

In 2006, DiFillipo opened a restaurant under the separate brand Avila’s, focusing on pan-Mediterranean cuisine.

DiFillippo launched the “Philly Cheese Steak Spring Roll” in 2007 as a retail product sold nationally within the US, ultimately expanding into a variety of flavor options.

In 2008, DiFillipo opened Davio’s Patriot Place, which is located in the Patriot Place complex in order to take advantage of the demand for pre- and post-game entertainment.

In the fall of 2008 DiFillippo was inducted into the Massachusetts Restaurant Hall of Fame.

DiFillippo opened Davio’s Atlanta in August 2010 at Phipps Plaza in the Buckhead district of Atlanta, Georgia. His next venture is the opening of Davio’s New York across from Grand Central Station as well as another Davio’s location in his hometown of Lynnfield, Massachusetts, scheduled for the summer of 2013.

On November 5, 2020 Davio's opened in The Colony as part of the Grandscape Development, one of the largest and most unique mixed-use real estate developments in the country upon completion. Located in the Dallas, Texas, metropolitan area and being developed by Nebraska Furniture Mart, a Berkshire Hathaway company, the project will stretch across more than 400 acres, and feature more than 3.9 million square feet of retail, entertainment, residential, dining and attractions.

== Personal life ==
DiFillippo is actively involved in groups and boards including: Taste of the NFL, Rodman Ride for Kids, The Cambridge School of Culinary Arts, Raising-a-Reader of Massachusetts, The Ron Burton Training Village, and The Boston Dining Alliance. He is a contributing Vice Chair of the Board of Overseers of the Anti-Defamation League, New England Region. He also contributes business and restaurant related articles to The Huffington Post.

DiFillippo lives in Wenham, Massachusetts with his wife Pamela and their four children.
