= Joe Yonan =

American journalist

- Born: Joe Yonan; Albany, Georgia
- Education: University of Texas at Austin; Cambridge School of Culinary Arts
- Occupations: Vegetarian and plant-based food writer and cookbook author
- Writing career
- Subjects: Journalism; Cookbooks
- Notable works: Mastering the Art of Plant-Based Cooking: Vegan Recipes, Tips, and Techniques.(2024); Cool Beans: The Ultimate Guide to the World's Most Versatile Plant-Based Protein, with 125 Recipes. (2020)
- Notable awards: James Beard Awards Recipient
- Website: www.joeyonan.com

Joe Yonan is an American vegetarian/plant based food writer and cookbook author. He is the former Food and Dining Editor for The Washington Post, where he wrote the Weeknight Vegetarian column from 2013 to 2025. Yonan's 2024 cookbook Mastering the Art of Plant-Based Cooking won the 2025 James Beard Award.

== Early life and education ==
Yonan was born in Albany, Georgia, and is the grandson of Assyrian refugees. He grew up in San Angelo, Texas, the youngest of eight children. He graduated from the University of Texas at Austin with a BA in journalism in 1989, and from the Cambridge School of Culinary Arts in 2000.

== Career ==
Yonan initially worked as a reporter for Boston media outlets. After many years in "hard news," however, and not receiving a promotion from The Boston Globe, Yonan explored a career change. He read What Color Is Your Parachute? and realized that he wanted to focus on food writing. He recalls that, “I knew I didn’t want to become a chef... I just wanted to combine my biggest passions and that was writing, journalism and food.” Realizing that he needed a culinary background, Yonan joined the Cambridge School of Culinary Arts in 1999, and graduated in 2000. In 2006, he joined The Washington Post as food editor and food writer, where he wrote the "Cooking for One" column for five years. He then wrote the Weeknight Vegetarian column from 2013 until 2025, when he took a voluntary separation package and left the newspaper.

=== Plant-based cooking ===
Although Yonan grew up on a diet of "T-bones" and "the first thing he remembers learning to make as a kid was chicken-fried steak," he publicly "came out" in 2013 as a vegetarian via a column in The Washington Post. He was living on his sister's and brother-in-law's homestead in Maine in 2012 when he became a vegetarian. The homestead grows vegetables, mushrooms, beans, walnuts, rye, wheat, and fruit. He states that he made the switch for health and environmental reasons, and credits growing up in San Angelo as vital towards his interest in beans, due to his constant consumption of Tex-Mex. Some of his favorite vegetarian cookbooks are Ten Talents (1968), Moosewood Cookbook (1977), and Vegetarian Cooking for Everyone (1997).

Yonan has said he is "90% vegan," and primarily writes about plant-based food.

== Honors and awards ==
Winner

- 2020: International Association of Culinary Professionals
- 2018: International Association of Culinary Professionals
- 2018: Association of Food Journalists

=== James Beard awards and nominations ===
Winner

- 2009: Best Newspaper Food Section
- 2010: Best Newspaper Food Section
- 2025: Mastering the Art of Plant-Based Cooking - James Beard Award (Media: Vegetable-Focused Cooking)

Nominee

- 2022: Cool Beans: The Ultimate Guide to Cooking with the World's Most Versatile Plant-Based Protein, with 125 (Single Subject)
- 2017: Food Coverage in a General-Interest Publication (Washington Post Food)
- 2011: Food Section of a General Interest Publication (The Washington Post)

== Cookbooks ==
Yonan's first book, Serve Yourself: Nightly Adventures in Cooking for One (2011), was born out of his monthly column for The Washington Post, Cooking for One, to help "single folks to realize that they don’t have to resort to takeout all the time, or processed food." Later, when describing his 2013 book, Eat Your Vegetables: Bold Recipes for the Single Cook, written as he was transitioning to a vegetarian diet, Publishers Weekly, argued that the "greatly appealing dishes in this collection open up a whole new culinary world for veggie lovers." Tasting Table included Cool Beans: The Ultimate Guide to the World's Most Versatile Plant-Based Protein, with 125 Recipes (2020) in its list of “The 14 Best Vegetarian Cookbooks That Even Meat Eaters Will Love," and Food & Wine listed it as one of their "Favorite Vegetarian Cookbooks."

=== Mastering the Art of Plant-Based Cooking (2024) ===
Yonan's 2024 cookbook Mastering the Art of Plant-Based Cooking won the 2025 James Beard Award (Media: Vegetable-Focused Cooking). VegNews included it in its list of "The Best Vegan Cookbooks of 2024," Food & Wine lists it as one of "The Best Cookbooks of 2024, According to Food & Wine Editors," columnist Avery Yale Kamila lists it among "The year’s best vegan cookbooks" in the Portland Press Herald, T. Susan Chang of NPR lists it on "Cooks We Love: 11 cookbooks from 2024 recommended by NPR critics and staff," Chowhound lists it as one of the "15 Best Vegetarian Cookbooks Of 2024," The New York Times lists it among "The 16 Best Cookbooks of 2024," and Laura Brehaut of The National Post featured the book in her Cook This column.

== Bibliography ==
=== Books ===
- Mastering the Art of Plant-Based Cooking: Vegan Recipes, Tips, and Techniques. Ten Speed Press, 2024. ISBN 978-1984860644.
- Cool Beans: The Ultimate Guide to the World's Most Versatile Plant-Based Protein, with 125 Recipes. Ten Speed Press 2020.ISBN 978-0399581489.
- (Editor) America The Great Cookbook. Weldon Owen, 2017. ISBN 978-1681882826.
- Eat Your Vegetables: Bold Recipes for the Single Cook. Ten Speed Press, 2013. ISBN 978-1607744429.
- Serve Yourself: Nightly Adventures in Cooking for One Ten Speed Press, 2011.ISBN 978-1580085137.

=== Foreword ===
- Schinner, Miyoko (2025). The Vegan Creamery: Plant-Based Cheese, Milk, Ice Cream, and More. New York: Ten Speed Press. ISBN 978-0593836071.

== Personal life ==
Yonan lives with his husband and their son in Washington D.C.

== See also ==
- List of American print journalists
- List of vegan and plant-based media
