= Charles E. Cassell =

American architect (1838–1916)

- Born: Charles Emmett Cassell; April 26, 1838; Portsmouth, Virginia, U.S.
- Died: August 29, 1916 (aged 78)
- Resting place: Cedar Grove Cemetery, Portsmouth, Virginia, US
- Education: University of Virginia
- Occupation: Architect
- Children: 1

Charles Emmett Cassell (April 26, 1838 – August 29, 1916) was a Baltimore, Maryland-based architect.

== Biography ==
He was born in Portsmouth, Virginia and trained as a naval architect. He received a degree in engineering from the University of Virginia at age 15. During the Civil War he served as a captain in the engineers corps, under General George Pickett of the Confederate States Army. After the war, he traveled to South America and served in the Chilean Navy. He returned to the United States and practiced architecture in St. Louis, Missouri before coming to Baltimore about 1868. He was a founding member of the Baltimore Chapter of the American Institute of Architects in 1870. He was known for his Romanesque Revival architecture style. He became an AIA fellow in 1905. In 1905, he had established Charles E. Cassell & Son in Baltimore, Maryland. His son John Cassell, died in 1909 from influenza. Following this, he occasionally associated with his nephew in Norfolk, Virginia under the office name of Cassell & Cassell. He is buried in his family’s lot at Cedar Grove Cemetery in Portsmouth, Virginia.

== Selected works ==
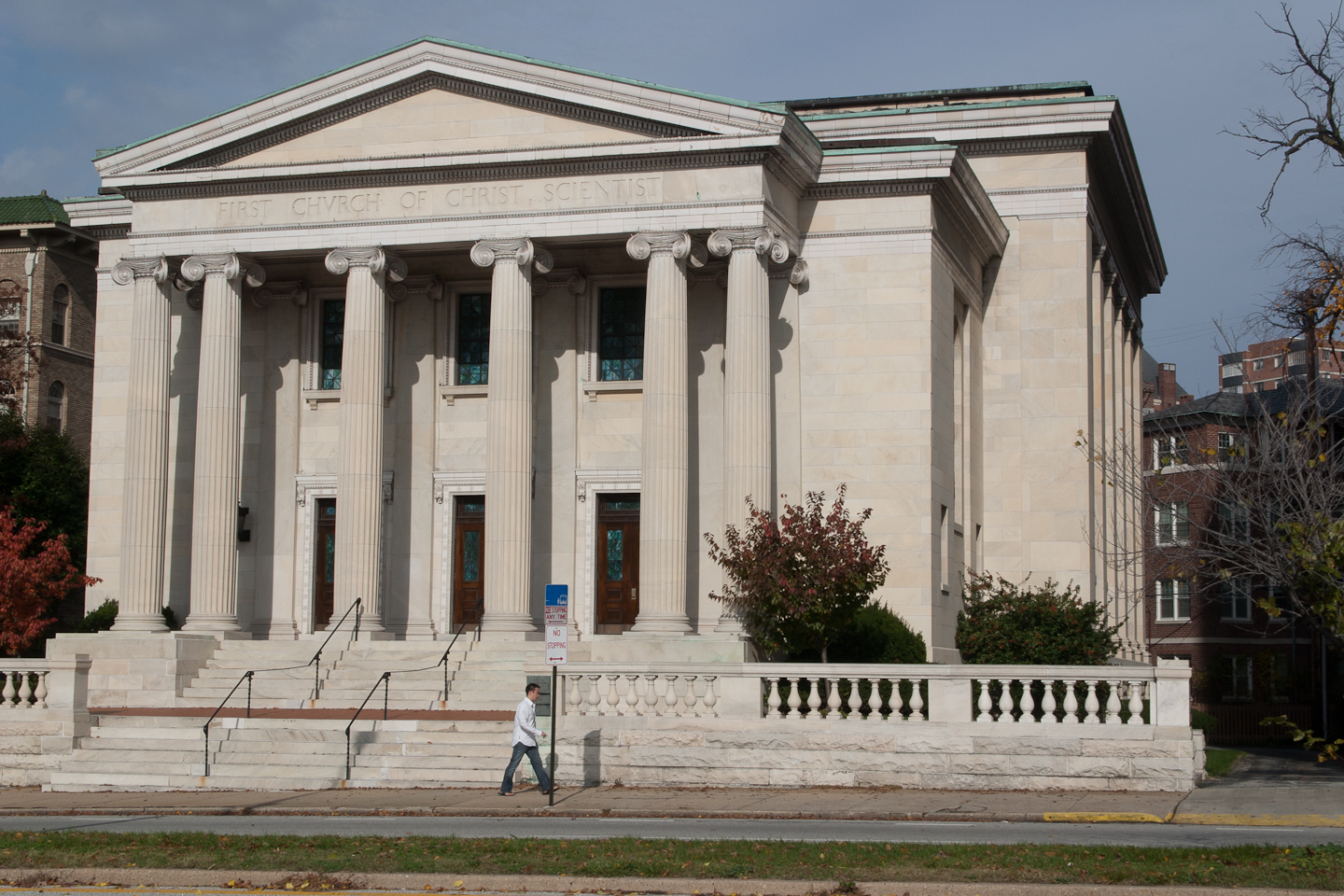
First Church of Christ, Scientist in Baltimore

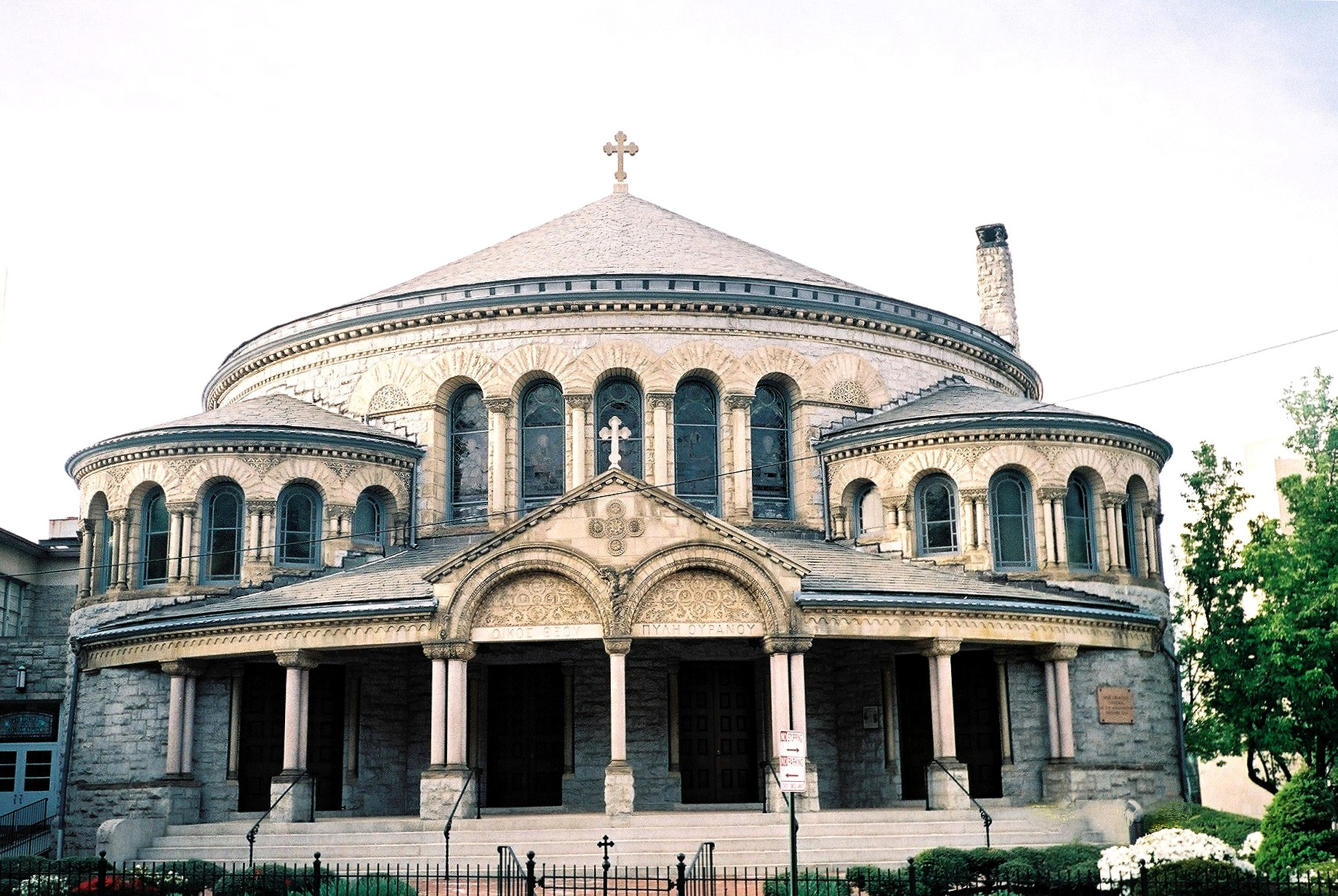
Greek Orthodox Cathedral of the Annunciation in Baltimore

- The naval waterworks at Old Point Comfort, Virginia
- Country house for Albert Hutzler
- Holy Trinity Episcopal Church, listed on the National Register of Historic Places in 1992, as a contributing building in the Onancock Historic District, Onancock, Virginia.
- 1881: Immanuel Chapel, Virginia Theological Seminary
- 1883: Christ Episcopal Church and Cemetery (Cambridge, Maryland), listed on the National Register of Historic Places in 1984.
- 1885: The Chapel, University of Virginia
- 1894: Davis Memorial Presbyterian Church, Elkins, West Virginia, listed on the National Register of Historic Places in 1984.
- 1894: The Stafford Hotel in Baltimore
- 1899: Stewart's Department Store, Baltimore, Maryland, listed on the National Register of Historic Places in 1999.
- 1904: Chamber of Commerce Building (Baltimore, Maryland), listed on the National Register of Historic Places in 1983.
- 1911: First Church of Christ, Scientist (Baltimore, Maryland), listed on the National Register of Historic Places in 1982.
