= Cambridge School of Culinary Arts =

Culinary School in Cambridge, Massachusetts

Coordinates: 42.3907°N 71.1217°W

- Type: Culinary school
- Established: 1974
- Students: 650
- Location: Cambridge, Massachusetts, United States
- Campus: Urban
- Website: www.cambridgeculinary.com

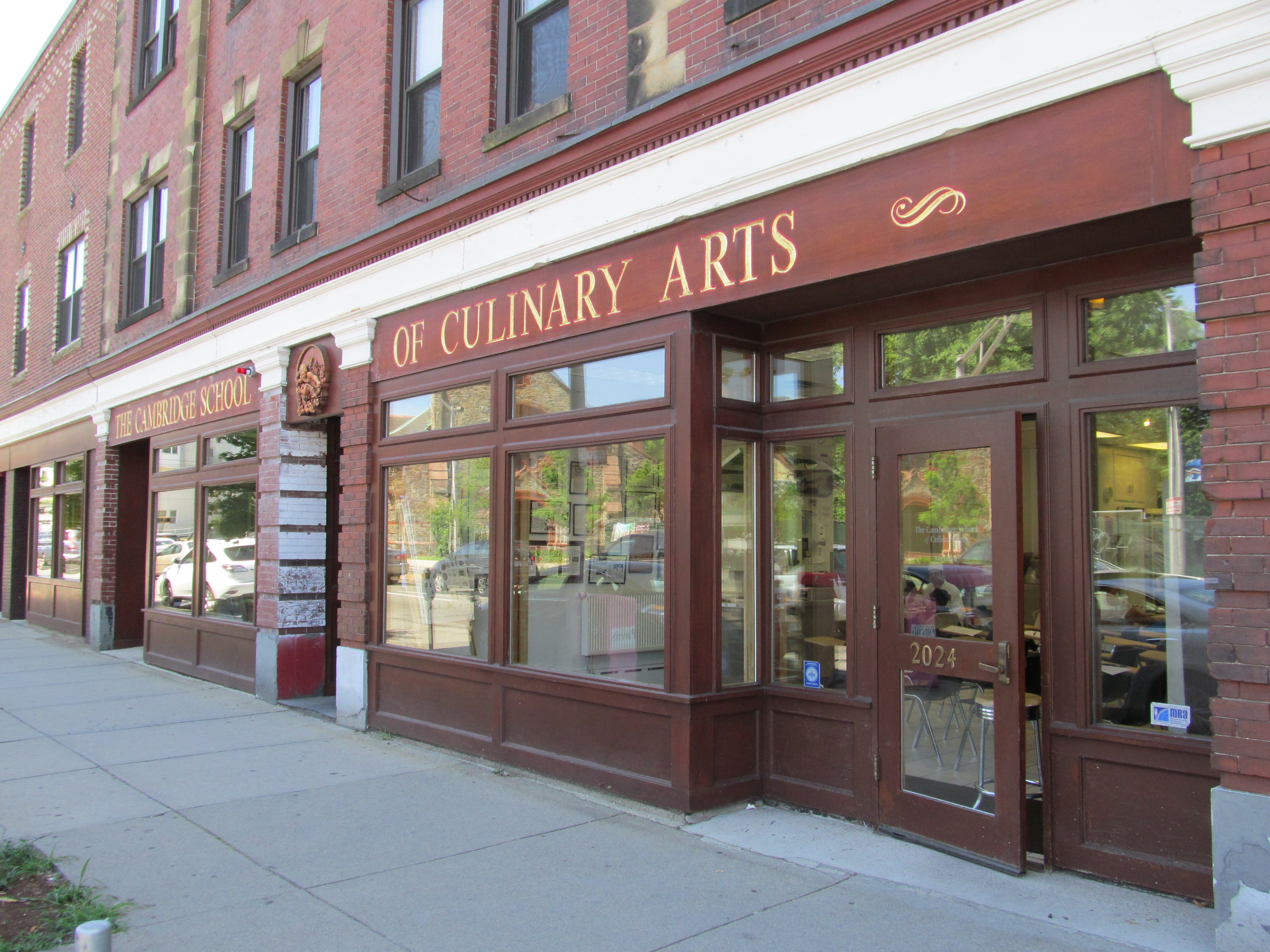
Cambridge School of Culinary Arts

Cambridge School of Culinary Arts (CSCA) is a professional school located in Cambridge, Massachusetts, United States. It offers several certificate and professional programs, including a culinary studies and pastry specialization. It also offers a variety of open-enrollment, one-day classes to the general public.

== History ==
Cambridge School of Culinary Arts was founded in 1974 by Roberta L. Dowling, CCP with classes in classical European cookery from her home. With the expansion of the program, Dowling moved the program to its current location at 2020 Massachusetts Avenue in Cambridge, Massachusetts. The program grew to over 400 students by the 1980s when Dowling decided to apply for accreditation for the school. The school was accredited in 1981 by the Commonwealth of Massachusetts, Department of Education and then by NATTS (National Association of Trade and Technical Schools) in 1989.

== Programs offered ==
The Cambridge School of Culinary Arts offers a diverse set of programs, including the following.

=== Professional programs ===
- Professional Chefs Program – 37 weeks in length with 20 hours of instruction per week
- Professional Pastry Program – 37 weeks in length with 20 hours of instruction per week headed by French Master Pastry Chef Delphin Gomes
- Culinary Certificate Program – 16 weeks in length with 19 hours of instruction per week
- Certificate Pastry Program – 16 weeks in length with 19 hours of instruction per week headed by French Master Pastry Chef Delphin Gomes

=== Recreational programs ===
The school offers a diverse blend of recreational classes for amateur cooks and professionals. These include classes on preparing classical sauces, gluten free cooking, multi-day basic cooking classes, ethnic cookery, knife skills, pastry, and other frequently arising topics of interest.

=== Culinary excursions ===
The school has offered culinary trips for both amateurs and professional chefs. Past trips have included Umbria, Italy and San Marino, Italy, Beijing, Xi'an, Suzhou, Shanghai, and Hong Kong.

== Accreditations ==
The Cambridge School of Culinary Arts is accredited by:

- Massachusetts Department of Education
- The National Association of Trade and Technical Schools (NATTS). The school replaced its NATTS accreditation with ACCSCT.
- The Accrediting Commission of Career Schools and Colleges of Technology (ACCSCT). The school voluntarily relinquished its ACCSC (formerly ACCSCT) accreditation in June 2015.
- It is also endorsed by the International Association of Culinary Professionals (IACP).

== Notable alumni ==
Chefs

- Karen Akunowicz '05, Fox & the Knife
- Tiffani Faison ‘03, Sweet Cheeks, Tiger Mama, Fool's Errand, Orfano

Food production-related businesses

- Steve DiFillippo '84, Davio's Restaurant, with locations in MA & PA

Writers

- Joe Yonan '00, food writer and cookbook author
