= First Church of Christ, Scientist (Baltimore) =

Historic church in Maryland, United States

- First Church of Christ, Scientist; Baltimore, Maryland
- U.S. National Register of Historic Places
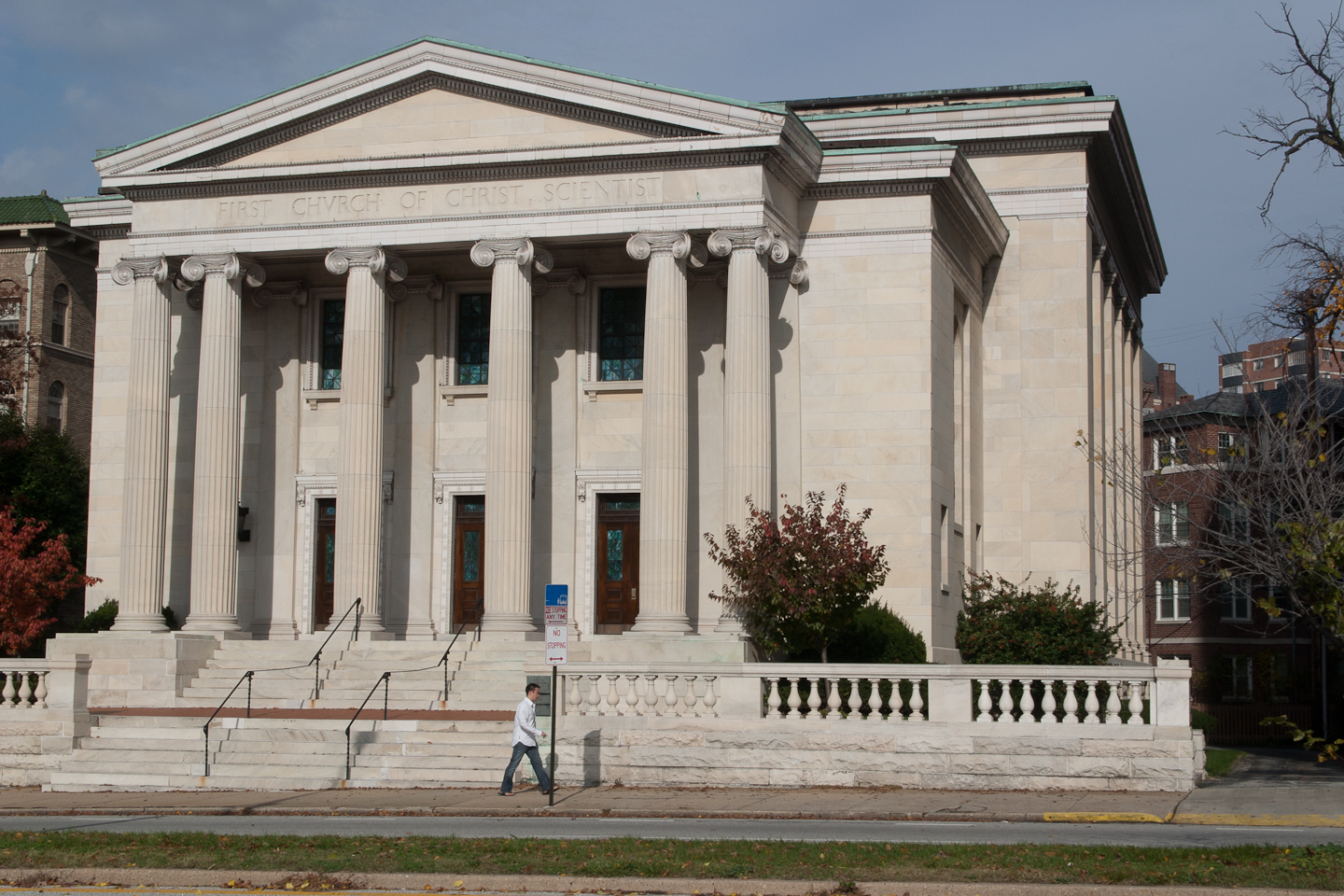
- First Church of Christ, Scientist, November 2008

- Location within Baltimore Location within Maryland Location within the United States
- Location: 102 West University Parkway; Baltimore, Maryland
- Coordinates: 39°20′6.06″N 76°37′16.09″W
- Area: 0.4 acres (0.16 ha)
- Built: 1911
- Architect: Cassell, Charles E.
- Architectural style: Classical Revival
- NRHP reference No.: 82001584
- Added to NRHP: December 27, 1982

First Church of Christ, Scientist, located at 102 West University Parkway, across from the campus of Johns Hopkins University, in the Tuscany-Canterbury neighborhood of Baltimore, Maryland, in the United States is an historic structure that on December 27, 1982, was added to the National Register of Historic Places.

== History ==
First Church of Christ, Scientist was built in 1911 by noted Baltimore architect, Charles E. Cassell, who designed the Chapel at the University of Virginia.

== Current use ==
First Church of Christ, Scientist is still an active Christian Science church.

== See also ==
- List of Registered Historic Places in Maryland
- First Church of Christ, Scientist (disambiguation)
