= Baltimore International College =

Private, non-profit college located in Baltimore, Maryland, US

- Type: Private
- Active: 1972–2011
- Students: 800
- Location: Baltimore, Maryland, U.S. 39°17′17″N 76°36′0″W
- Campus: 2 locations (Baltimore, Maryland, Virginia, Ireland)
- Website: http://www.bic.edu/

The Baltimore International College (BIC), founded in 1972, was a private, non-profit college located in Baltimore, Maryland. It offered specialized degree programs in Culinary Arts and Hospitality Management. The college was taken over by Stratford University in January 2012. Stratford University finally closed operations due to bankruptcy in February 2023.

== History ==
BIC was accredited by the American Culinary Federation. It lost its accreditation from the Middle States Association of Colleges and Schools on August 31, 2011, due to unaddressed issues from its 2007 review. BIC was acquired by Stratford University in January 2012, and the former campuses are now Stratford campuses, a university that finally closed down in 2023.

== Campus & facilities ==
The college's main campus is located in downtown Baltimore near the Inner Harbor. The college owns two full-service hotels downtown Baltimore—the Mount Vernon Hotel and Hopkins Inn. Further, BIC owns and operates the Bay Atlantic Club, which offers delivery breakfast and lunch, dine-in lunch, and as banquet hall with reservations. In addition, the college operates the Park Hotel on its 100-acre (400,000 m^{2}) Virginia Park satellite campus in Virginia, County Cavan, Ireland.

== Students ==
The college offers student housing in Dublin Hall, which is location in the Mount Vernon Hotel. Slightly more than half (52 percent) of its 800 or so students are male.
