= Stratford University =

Defunct American and Indian university

Coordinates: 38°54′26.53″N 77°12′52.13″W

- Motto: Scientia est potentia
- Motto in English: Knowledge is power
- Type: Private university
- Active: 1976; 50 years ago–December 18, 2022
- President: Richard R. Shurtz II.
- Total staff: 56 full-time, 140 part-time
- Undergraduates: 1,240
- Postgraduates: 137
- Location: US: Alexandria, Virginia, Woodbridge, Virginia, Baltimore, Maryland; India: New Delhi, India
- Campus: Urban campuses
- Colors: Blue & silver
- Mascot: Cardinal
- Website: www.stratford.edu

- Location within Northern Virginia Location within Virginia Location within the United States

Stratford University was a for-profit private university based in Virginia. Founded in 1976, Stratford delivered online, classroom, and blended online/classroom programs. It closed at the end of the fall 2022 semester after losing its accreditation.

Stratford University had two campuses in Virginia (Alexandria and Woodbridge), a campus in Baltimore, Maryland, and a learning site in New Delhi, India. The majority of the student body was non-traditional and worked full-time while attending school. Stratford's international student body represented over thirty countries. Approximately 20 percent of the student body was international and 20 percent was military.

The Stratford campus in India was a joint venture with the Modi Group, created to offer residential American degrees in India. The legal name of the Indian joint venture is Modi Stratford Education Management (MSEM), Pvt. Ltd. The Modi Stratford Foundation, a wholly owned non-profit subsidiary of MSEM, delivered the academic programs in India as an overseas campus of Stratford University.

== History ==
Stratford University signed a letter of intent for an affiliation with Baltimore International College (BIC) on August 12, 2011. The university received approval from the Maryland Higher Education Commission and Baltimore officially became an additional location of Stratford University on December 1, 2011.

Stratford University signed a memorandum of understanding with Sojourner-Douglass College (SDC) on April 2, 2015. The memorandum outlined which SDC programs would transition to Stratford after June 30, 2015, the date that SDC would lose its accreditation. This location was renamed the Sojourner-Douglass Center at Stratford University.

Stratford University received the Virginia V3 Perseverando Award for both 2015 and 2016. The awards were presented to Stratford by Virginia Governor Terry McAuliffe of at the Annual Chamber of Commerce Workforce Conference in Richmond.

In 2016, U.S. Secretary of Commerce Penny Pritzker presented Stratford University with the President’s "E" Award for Exports. It is the highest recognition any U.S. entity can receive for making a significant contribution to the expansion of U.S. exports. The 'E' Awards noted Stratford University's dedication to providing quality education to students around the world, particularly its investment in language training programs.

In 2019, Stratford announced that it would be closing three of its campuses in Virginia, including campuses in Newport News and Virginia Beach. Noting Stratford's problems with its accreditor, The Center for Immigration Studies labeled the school as a "marginal university."

In 2020, Stratford's accreditor, the Accrediting Council for Independent Colleges and Schools, was investigating the school for allegedly operating an unapproved program in Irbil, Iraq.

In 2022, the United States Department of Education decertified Stratford's accreditor, causing the university to announce that it would cease operations following the end of the Fall 2022 term. The following year, Stratford University filed for Chapter 7 bankruptcy.

Two years after its closure, in 2024, USA Today reported that a mysterious online presence for Stratford University was created, likely indicating that someone was using its name to perpetuate a scam.

== Academics ==
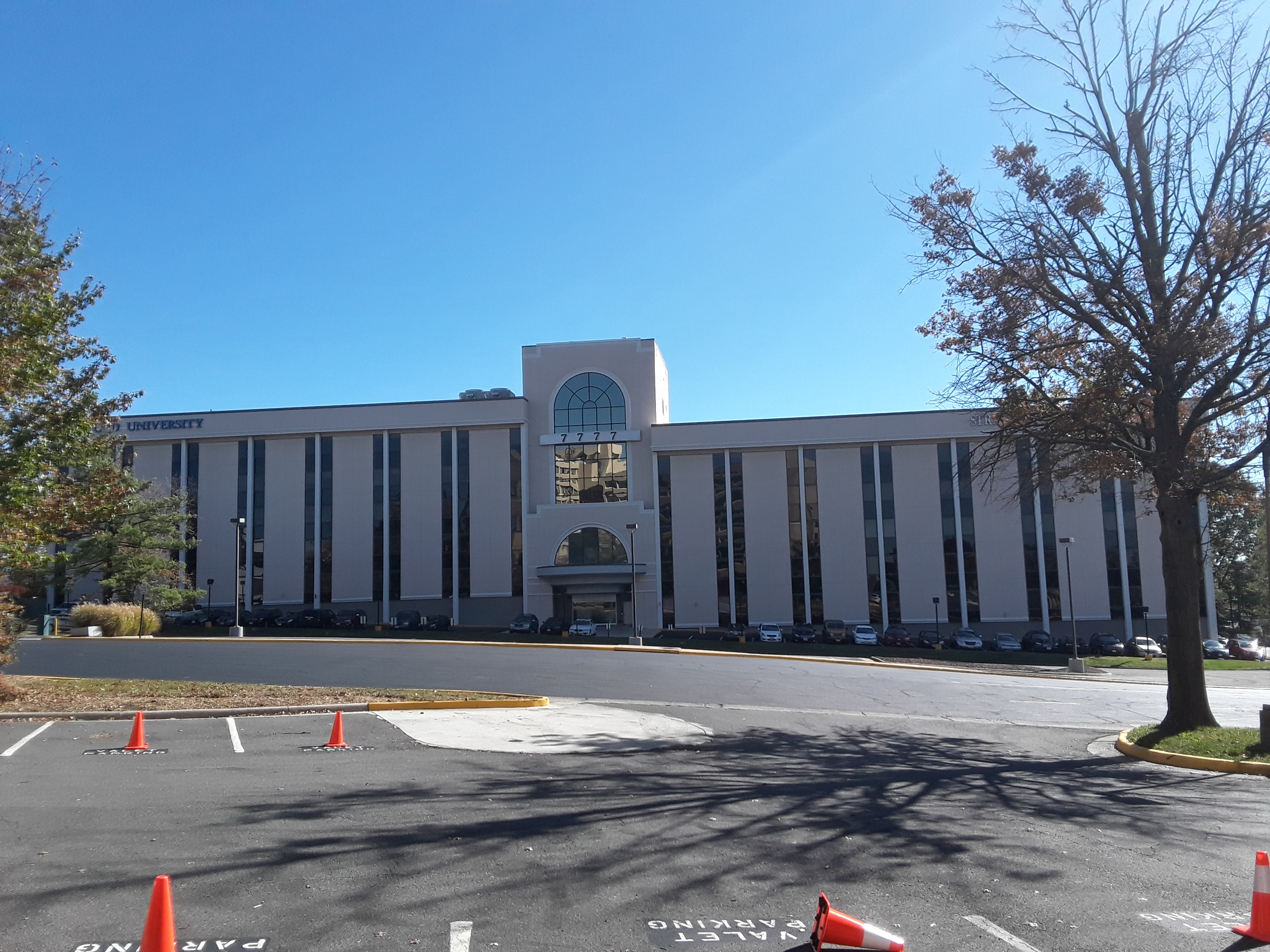
Stratford University building in Falls Church, Virginia

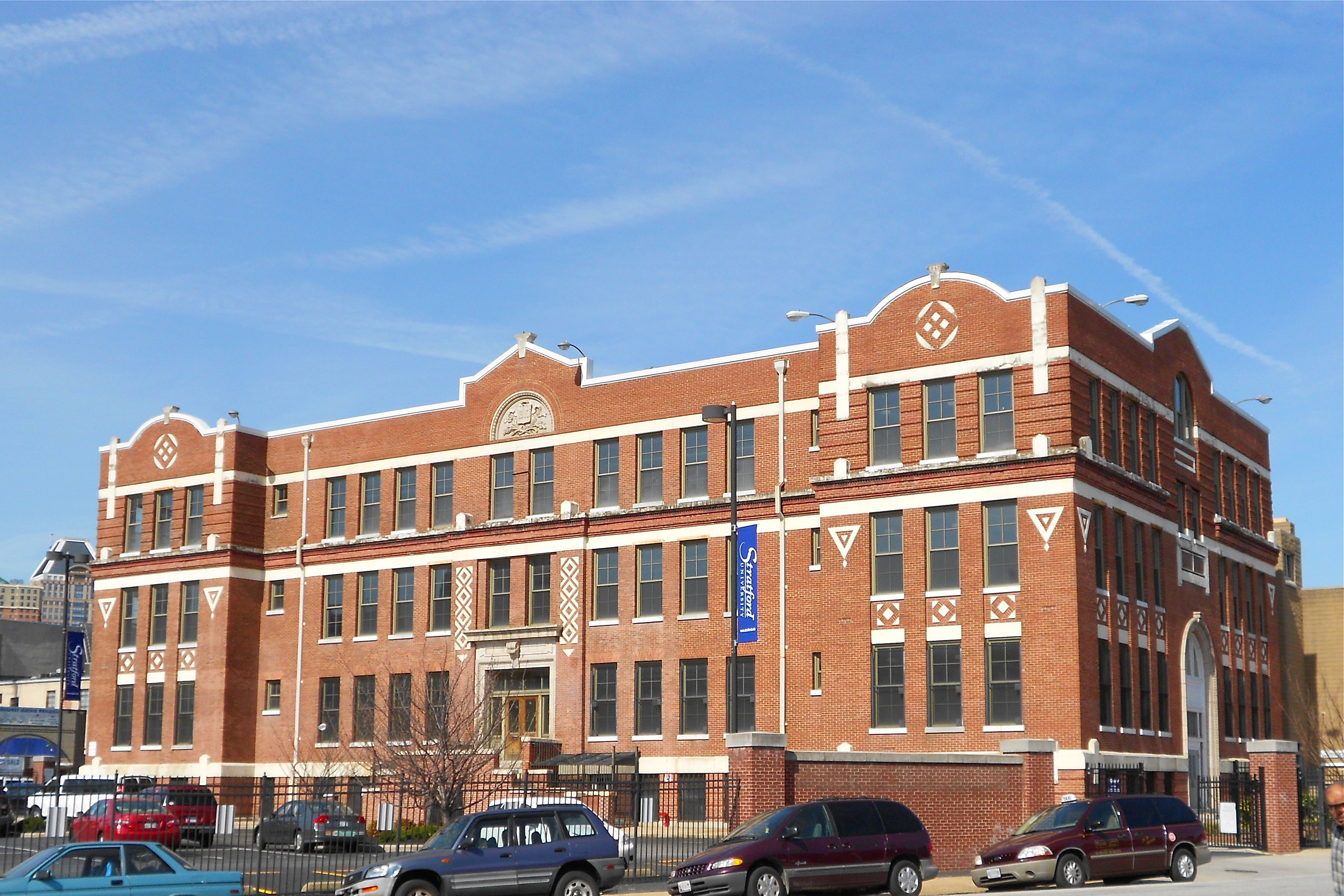
A Stratford University building in Baltimore, seen in 2012

Stratford awarded graduate and undergraduate degrees. Online, residential, and blended programs were available. All online and blended courses used the Stratford online Moodle platform hosted in Stratford's data center.

Stratford had established programs to help US military and former-US military personnel complete their education and was recognized by the Veterans Administration as a member of the Yellow Ribbon Program. Stratford offered non-credit continuing education and professional development courses like Event Management Certificate Program, Culinary Workshops and Certification Courses including Oracle, MSCE, .Net Framework, Cisco, Linux, and computer security-related topics for students and IT professionals.

Stratford's Language Institute offered an academic English as Second Language (ESL) program to help international students enter a degree program.

== Rankings ==
Washington Monthly's 2020 rankings placed Stratford number 605 out of 614 masters-level universities in social mobility.

== Accreditation and affiliations ==
Stratford University was accredited by the Accrediting Council for Independent Colleges and Schools (ACICS) to award degrees through the master's level. It was exempt from requirements of oversight to grant Associate, Bachelor's, Master's, and Doctorate degrees by State Council of Higher Education for Virginia (SCHEV).

Stratford's nursing program was approved by the Virginia Board of Nursing and accredited by the Commission on Collegiate Nursing Education. The university's medical assisting program was accredited by the Accrediting Bureau of Health Education Schools and its Language Institute was accredited by the Commission on English Language Program Accreditation.

Stratford's culinary programs were accredited by the American Culinary Federation (ACF). Stratford was a member of the International Association of Culinary Professionals.
