= Enoteca =

Italian word for a wine respository, or special types of wine

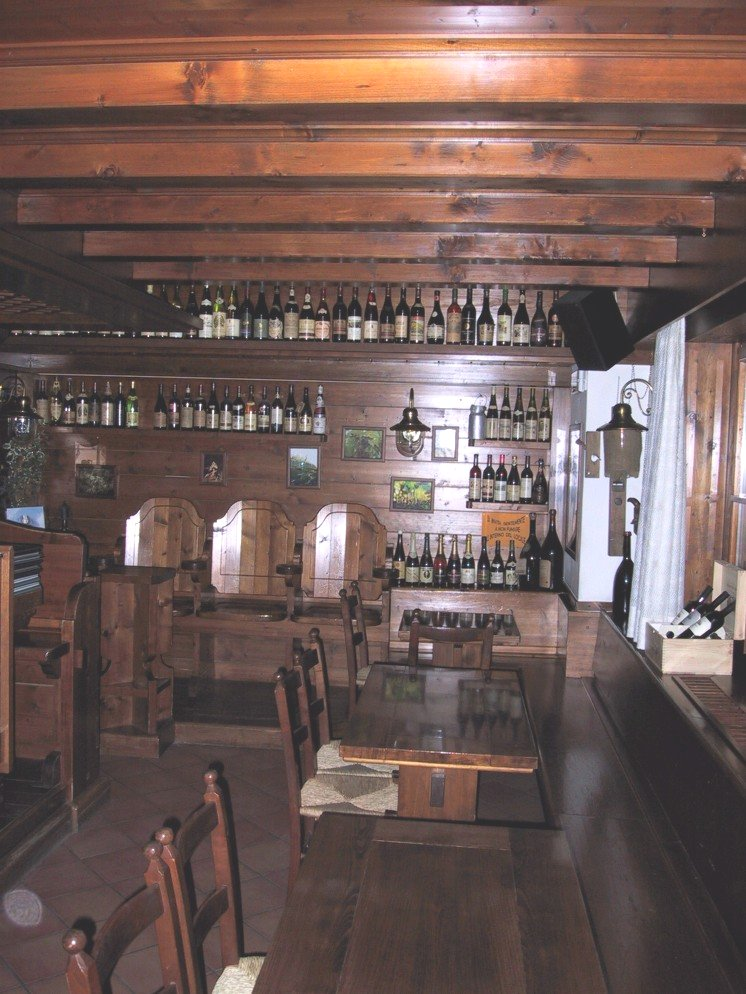
Interior view of an enoteca in Tambre, Veneto, Italy

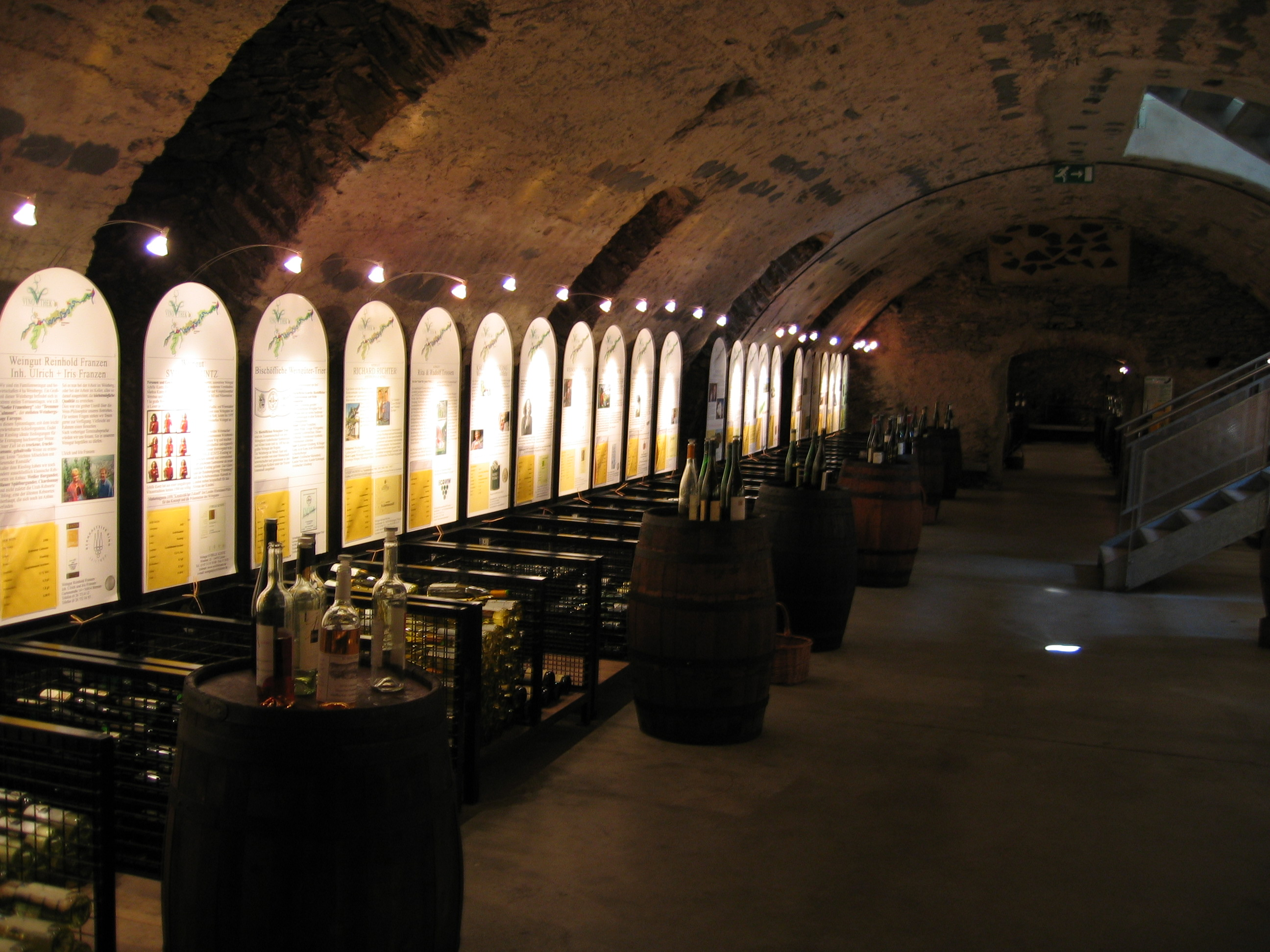
Cellars of the Vinothek in Bernkastel-Kues in the Mosel wine region of Germany

Enoteca is an Italian word that is derived from the Greek word Οινοθήκη, which literally means 'wine repository' (from Oeno/Eno-, Οινός, 'wine', and teca, Θήκη, 'receptacle, case, box'), but it is used to describe a special type of local or regional wine shop that originated in Italy. The concept of an enoteca has also spread to some other countries.

A genuine enoteca is primarily directed at giving visitors or tourists the possibility to taste these wines at a reasonable price and possibly to buy them. An enoteca is often run in collaboration with growers or growers' or tourism organisations in the village or region. The reason such establishments were named to connote "wine libraries" was that they were intended as a hands-on source of information on local wines rather than as regular outlets for larger quantities of each wine, or primarily intended for established customers. Often, an enoteca stocks rather small amounts of each wine, and customers who wish to purchase large quantities after tasting are referred directly to the producers. In some cases, an enoteca will also sell other local foodstuff and/or serve small snacks to go with the wines.

A long-standing tradition that precedes the new coinage, is the wine shop in Palazzo Antinori, in Florence, where Antinori wines have been available by the glass for more than a century.

Enoteche have spread north of the Alps, to Austria, under the German name Vinothek, and from Austria to Germany.

Being associated with an enoteca is probably more beneficial to smaller, not too well-known producers than to large or well-established ones. Casual visitors will have an easier time discovering an enoteca, and the producer will not have to keep an outlet open in his winery just in case someone passes by to purchase a few bottles. On the other hand, having many wines available side-by-side for tasting, comparison and competition, will be better for well-performing wineries.

== Other uses of the term ==
=== Wine shops and restaurants ===
Because of the popularity of the enoteca concept in some locations, "regular high-end" wine shops sometimes also call themselves enoteca or Vinothek, without focusing on local wines or catering to visitor's information need. A quality wine shop is most often called enoteca in Italian now. In the past bottiglieria was commonly used, but is now falling into disuse and doesn't have the same connotation of quality.

Since some enoteche serve snacks with the wine, enoteca has also been used as the name of some wine bars or restaurants, especially bistro-style restaurants with Italian food.

=== Wine libraries ===
Enoteca, Vinothek or œnothèque (the corresponding French term) may also be used to denote "wine libraries" in two additional meanings of the word:

- An information repository about wine.
- A storage facility for actual wines. As an example, champagne producer Moët & Chandon produces a late-disgorged version of their prestige cuvée Dom Pérignon, called "Dom Perignon Œnothèque", which spends a number of extra years in Moët & Chandon's cellar before being released.

== See also ==
- Trattoria

== Sources ==
- This article also includes information from two articles in German Wikipedia: Enoteca, version from September 22, 2007 and Vinothek, version from January 11, 2008.
