= California Pacific University =

Private non-profit business school

Coordinates: 33°7′34″N 117°4′4″W

- Motto: Tradition With An Independent Spirit
- Type: Private university
- Active: 1976–2016
- CEO: Roel C. Fernandez
- Location: Pinole, California, U.S.
- Campus: Escondido, Pinole, California & Bakersfield, California

California Pacific University (or Cal Pacific University) was a private university originally founded in Escondido, California. Its law school was originally located in Bakersfield, California. The business school was aimed towards working professionals in business management, and the law school was aimed at working professionals seeking to become attorneys or work in the legal profession.

== History ==
CPU was founded in 1976. It was founded by:

- N. Charles Dalton, (Principal)
- H. Ronald Domnitz, a retired San Diego Superior Court Judge, current attorney and family law mediator.
- Norm Deimling, MBA president of the Joshua Foundation
- Mark Dalton, MBA
- Jane Dalton

The university was located in Escondido, California, 30 miles northeast of downtown San Diego. California Pacific later moved to the city of Pinole in northern California. California Pacific University provided educational bachelors, masters, and doctoral degrees on and off campus. It has been reported to have had a staff of 7. California Pacific University once had an affiliation with Alabama A&M University, in a partnership to host its evening MBA program in San Diego California.

The university was approved under the qualitative standards mandated by the State of California Educational Reform Act of 1977. Moreover, it was approved by the State of California to offer academic degree programs by distance study without residency requirements. In June 1986, the California Postsecondary Education Commission in cooperation with the Student Aid Commission listed California Pacific University as an eligible and approved university to participate in the California Cal Grant student aid program on the recommendation of The California State Superintendent of Public Instruction and Education.

In a 1989 report protecting the integrity of California degrees to the Governor and to the California Legislature, the California Postsecondary Education Commission described California Pacific University's programs as follows:

California Pacific University … was established in 1976 to train professional managers who are capable of exercising leadership in a variety of settings – public as well as private, who are skilled in the theoretical, analytical, and human resources areas of management, and who respect the dignity and worth of the individuals with whom they work. It offers bachelor's, master's and doctor's degrees only in its particular area of expertise – business and management-- rather than trying to cover a wide variety of fields, as do some other universities.

The university received an honorable mention from widely known Author John Bear in his 1989 book "Bear's Guide to Earning Non-Traditional College Degrees" and further mentioned in his 1995 book "College Degrees by Mail" as one of the nations top 100 good schools that offer, Bachelor's, Master's, Doctorates and Law Degrees by Home Study.

Founder of California Pacific University, Charles Dalton was instrumental in helping to get the Assembly Bill 1993 amended. On June 21, 1990, he appeared and gave a public testimony on behalf of California Pacific University alongside representatives of many other California postsecondary colleges and universities expressing concerns as to multiple articles of the (Assembly Bill 1993) and new regulations for California state oversight of private colleges, universities, and vocational schools. After review of all oral testimonies, a public preliminary draft of regulations to implement the "Private Postsecondary and Vocational Education Reform Act of 1989" was issued by the California Postsecondary Education Commission in October 1990. This was in response to the Assembly Bill 1993 (Chapter 1324, Statutes of 1989). In 1991, the California Postsecondary Education Commission found that the state's standards relating to institutional stability, institutional integrity, and consumer protection, were more stringent than those required by the accrediting agencies. The commission, therefore, advised against the state's relying directly on regional and national accrediting agency processes in lieu of the State's licensure processes. Dalton died on April 11, 2011, of natural causes in Escondido, California.

== California Pacific School Of Law ==
California Pacific School of Law was located in the Civic Center of Bakersfield, California. The university's school of law hosted evening classes which provided full-time working adults an opportunity to earn a Juris Doctor degree while working and meeting other family obligations.

California Pacific University School of Law was accredited by the Committee of Bar Examiners of the State Bar of California. The schools Law studies met the educational requirements of the State Bar of California, therefore its graduates had the opportunity to sit for the California General Bar Exam. CPSL was mentioned in David Hollander's 1997 edition of "The Best Law Schools" as one of many good law schools in the USA.

In addition, CPSL operated with the approval of the California State Department of Education, California Bureau for Private Postsecondary and Vocational Education, now the California Bureau for Private Postsecondary Education as a law school, which was authorized to grant the Juris Doctor (JD) degree. Bar review courses were also offered for local law school graduates and California Pacific students in preparation of the California bar examination The school operated for 17 years until its closure in the early 2000s

== California Pacific School of Business Academics ==
The university observed the quarter system. Credits were earned in 5 quarter units and covered courses in Business Administration and Management, Operations, General, Health and Medical Administration.

The university offered the following degrees:

- Bachelor of Business Administration
- Bachelor of Computer Science
- Master of Business Administration
- Master of Arts in Healthcare Administration
- MBA with Emphasis in Healthcare Administration
- Doctor of Business Administration
- Doctor of Philosophy

Upon completion of an MA in Healthcare Administration or MA in Management and Human Behavior, degree holders were eligible to sit for Licensure as a California Nursing Home Administrator

=== Approval and accreditation ===
The university gained approval by the California Department of Education in the mid-1980s. In 1986, the California Postsecondary Education Commission in cooperation with the Student Aid Commission listed California Pacific University as an eligible and approved university to participate in the California Cal Grant student aid program on the recommendation of The California State Superintendent of Public Instruction and Education. The university was accredited by Accrediting Council for Independent Colleges and Schools. Later, CPU received approval through the California Bureau for Private Postsecondary and Vocational Education (BPPVE). However, the California Bureau for Private Postsecondary and Vocational Education ceased operation on July 1, 2007. In 2009, CPU was a listed applicant to gain accreditation in a report issued by the Distance Education Accrediting Commission, an accreditor recognized by the Council for Higher Education Accreditation and the United States Department of Education. In 2010, the California Bureau for Private Postsecondary Education (BPPE), a new agency contracted by the California Department of Consumer Affairs was established to replace the California Bureau for Private Postsecondary and Vocational Education to continue regulating private postsecondary educational institutions operating in the state. Under the new agency regulations, California Pacific maintained its approval (California School Code #3701571) to grant BBAs, MBAs, MAs, DBAs and PhDs in Management, Business, Health Care, and Human Behavior.

=== 2016 closure ===
On July 22, 2016, the California Bureau for Private Postsecondary Education denied California Pacific's annual application to renew its approval to operate due to non-compliance of an annual report required by the California Bureau for Private Postsecondary Education. Under the California Bureau for Private Postsecondary Education California Education Code Section 94888, an institution that is denied renewal of an approval to operate may file an appeal. However, the university waived its right to appeal and closed its doors. The California Bureau for Private Postsecondary Education recognized California Pacific University as an approved institution until September 12, 2016. The university officially closed on September 18, 2016.

Student records are maintained by the custodian of record as required under the California Department of Education and the California Bureau for Private Postsecondary Education's local law Article 3. Maintenance of Records 71930. Student records are referred to the "closed school" unit of the California Bureau for Private Postsecondary Education.
