= California Pacific =

California Pacific may refer to:

- California Pacific Airlines, a former airline
- California Pacific Computer Company, a defunct computer game publisher
- California Pacific Medical Center, a large campus of four hospitals in Northern California
- California Pacific Railroad, a 19th-century railroad company
- California Pacific University, a former distance learning university
- CalPac (airline), a former division of Mesa Airlines
