= Aerodynamics Inc. =

American charter airline

Aerodynamics Inc. (ADI)
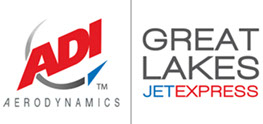
IATA	ICAO	Call sign
4A	DYN	AERODYNAMICS
- Founded: 1959; 67 years ago
- Ceased operations: March 26, 2018; 8 years ago (acquired by California Pacific Airlines)
- Hubs: Denver International Airport
- Fleet size: 4
- Destinations: 3
- Headquarters: Kennesaw, Georgia, U.S.
- Key people: John and Janet Beardsley (owners)
- Website: http://www.flyadi.com/ (redirects to CP Air)

Aerodynamics Inc., also known as ADI, was an American charter airline that began offering scheduled services subsidized by the Essential Air Service program in 2016 under a codeshare agreement with Great Lakes Airlines. It was purchased in 2018 by California Pacific Airlines, when the airline officially shut down.

== Corporate history ==
The airline was based in Kennesaw, Georgia and the airline's website claims it was founded in 1959.

The airline filed for Chapter 11 bankruptcy re-organization in August 2013. The company had also owned a large contract maintenance operation at Oakland County International Airport which was shut down in 2012.

Business Aircraft Group, Inc.'s CEO M.L. (Mike) Hoyle provided the DIP financing along with establishing a new company who performed the "stalking horse" duties to bring ADI out of bankruptcy. Hoyle held the position of Chairman for 12 months following ADI's emergence from bankruptcy before divesting his interest in ADI.

In 2015 the airline was purchased from its former owner Scott Beale by John and Janet Beardsley. The Beardsleys also owned SeaPort Airlines which filed for bankruptcy in February 2016. Seaport was later shut down and liquidated that September.

At the end of 2017 Aerodynamics was purchased by California Pacific Airlines, a startup regional carrier based in Carlsbad, California in North San Diego County. The purchase included Aerodynamics' fleet of four planes and its contract serving Pierre and Watertown.

== Scheduled air service ==
The airline first applied and was selected to operate subsidized Essential Air Service flights to Kearney, Nebraska; Scottsbluff, Nebraska; and Pierre, South Dakota in 2015. Later the United States Department of Transportation blocked its authority to operate those flights because of concerns over owner-operator Scott Beale's fitness to operate the airline and his history of defrauding suppliers. This ultimately triggered the purchase of the company by the Beardsleys and the DOT later restored the airline's operating authority.

The airline operated its first scheduled flight between Youngstown–Warren Regional Airport in Youngstown, Ohio and O'Hare International Airport in Chicago on July 1, 2016. The flights were operated under a codeshare with Great Lakes Airlines as Great Lakes Jet Express, with ADI expecting that this arrangement would allow them to take advantage of Great Lakes' interline agreement with United Airlines for connections in Chicago. However, United refused to honor that agreement as Great Lakes did not at that time offer any flights of their own to Chicago. The service ceased abruptly on August 17 of the same year, less than two months after it started.

The airline began Essential Air Service flights from Denver International Airport to Pierre Regional Airport with onward continuing service to Watertown Regional Airport (in Watertown, South Dakota) on August 15, 2016. These flights were also operated under the Great Lakes Jet Express branding, but in this case the interline agreement was honored by United, as the flights were handled like regular Great Lakes flights in Denver as it was Great Lakes' largest hub.

In 2017 the airline bid for EAS flying under the name "SkyValue Airlines."

On March 26, 2018, Great Lakes Airlines announced that operations would be suspended effective at midnight. However, certain segments of the company continued to operate, including Great Lakes Jet Express flights to Pierre and Watertown in South Dakota. Ground employees handling ADI's flights became employees of ADI, although Great Lakes continued handling ADI's ticketing for a time.

On May 29, 2018, ADI was purchased by California Pacific Airlines. For a few months it did business as California Pacific on the Pierre/Watertown route, as well as California Pacific's intended markets out of McClellan–Palomar Airport. However, in December 2018 CPA suspended its West Coast operations, and in January 2019 its EAS operations were abruptly shut down as well, leaving Pierre (the capital of South Dakota) and Watertown without any scheduled commercial air service.

== Fleet ==
Aerodynamics, Inc. operated a fleet of Embraer ERJ-145 regional jet aircraft with 50 seats.

Elite Airways fleet
Aircraft	In service	Orders	Notes
Embraer ERJ-145	4	−	Configured to seat 50 passengers
Total	4	−	

== Destinations ==
ADI operated scheduled flights to the following destinations :

Operating base
Focus city
Future destination
Terminated destination

Country (state/province)	City	Airport	Begin	End	Notes
United States (Colorado)	Denver	Denver International Airport	2016	2019	
United States (South Dakota)	Pierre	Pierre Regional Airport	2016	2019	Essential Air Service
United States (South Dakota)	Watertown	Watertown Regional Airport	2016	2019	Essential Air Service
United States (Illinois)	Chicago	O'Hare International Airport	2016	2016	
United States (Ohio)	Youngstown	Youngstown–Warren Regional Airport	2016	2016	

== See also ==
- List of defunct airlines of the United States
