= CalPac =

CalPac may refer to:

- CalPac (airline), a former division of Mesa Airlines
- California Pacific Conference, a U.S. collegiate sports conference located in California, affiliated with the National Association of Intercollegiate Athletics (NAIA)

== See also ==
- California Pacific (disambiguation)
- Kalpak, a high-crowned cap
