= Piedmont University (California) =

Christian university in Los Angeles, California, U.S.

Coordinates: 33.9372°N 118.2911°W

- Type: Unaccredited
- Established: 2000
- President: J. William Stinde
- Location: Los Angeles, California, United States
- Website: piedmontuniversity.ac

Piedmont University is an unaccredited non-profit Christian institution in Los Angeles. It emphasizes preparation for the evangelical ministry, along with education in traditional Asian medicine. It offers the degree programs of Bachelor of Arts in Theology (B.A. Th.), Master of Arts in Missiology (M.A. Miss.), Master of Arts in Church Music (M.A.C.M), Master of Science in Oriental Medicine (M.S.O.M), and Doctor of Ministry (D.Min.).

== History ==
In 2000, Piedmont University was started as a religious school.

In 2011, Piedmont University started a school of business and management, primarily using distant education, offering a Master's of Business Management (MBA) with concentration of studies in both traditional business subjects but also that of Church Management. Also the University plans to open a program in American Business Culture and English in a traditional classroom format.

The school is not accredited, but its programs were listed in the State of California's Bureau for Private Postsecondary and Vocational Education. The president is J. William Stinde, Ph.D. and the chancellor and CEO is Rev. Dr. Sooueng Gan, Th.D., D.D.

== See also ==
- List of unaccredited institutions of higher learning
- Higher education accreditation
