= Aerodynamic (disambiguation) =

Aerodynamics is the science of the motion of air.

Aerodynamic may also refer to:

- "Aerodynamic" (instrumental), a 2001 instrumental by Daft Punk
- "Aerodynamic", a 2025 song by King Gizzard & the Lizard Wizard from Phantom Island
- Aerodynamic center
- Aerodynamics Inc., an American charter airline
- Aerodynamics Research Institute

== See also ==
- Aerobraking
- Automotive aerodynamics
