= Pierre Regional Airport =

Airport in South Dakota, United States

Pierre Regional Airport Pierre Army Airfield

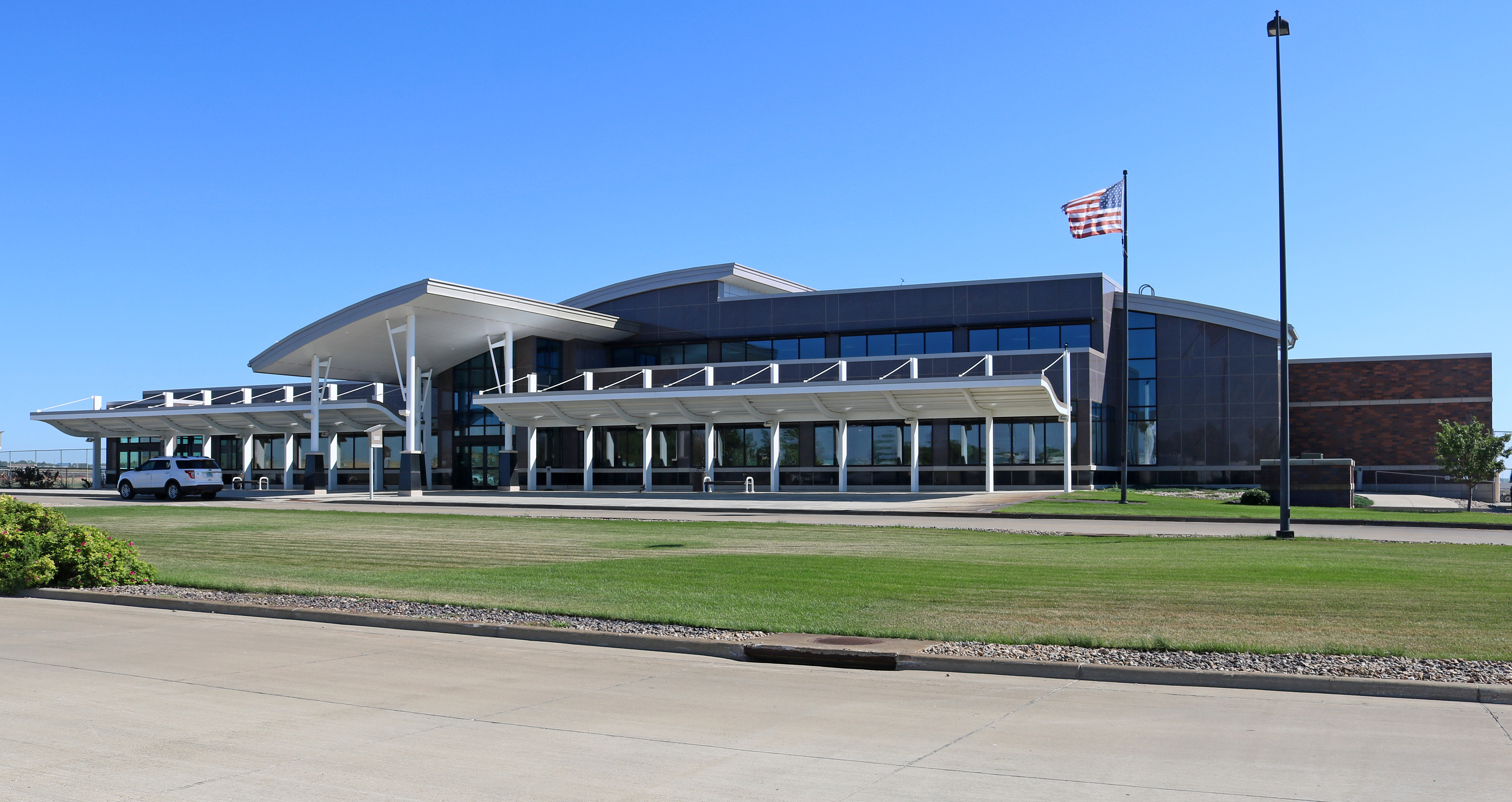
- Terminal building
- IATA: PIR; ICAO: KPIR; FAA LID: PIR

Summary
- Airport type: Public
- Owner: City of Pierre
- Serves: Pierre, South Dakota
- Elevation AMSL: 1,744 ft (532 m)
- Coordinates: 44°22′58″N 100°17′10″W
- Website: PierreAirport.com

Maps
- FAA airport diagram
- Interactive map of Pierre Regional Airport

Runways
Direction	Length		Surface
Direction	ft	m	Surface
7/25	6,880	2,097	Asphalt
13/31	6,900	2,103	Asphalt

Statistics (2019)
- Aircraft operations (year ending 9/13/2019): 31,960
- Based aircraft: 63
- Source: Federal Aviation Administration

Pierre Regional Airport (IATA: PIR, ICAO: KPIR, FAA LID: PIR) is a public airport three miles east of Pierre, in Hughes County, South Dakota.

Federal Aviation Administration records say the airport had 15,983 passenger boardings (enplanements) in calendar year 2008, 13,692 in 2009 and 14,686 in 2010. The National Plan of Integrated Airport Systems for 2011–2015 categorized it as a primary commercial service airport (more than 10,000 enplanements per year).

== Facilities ==
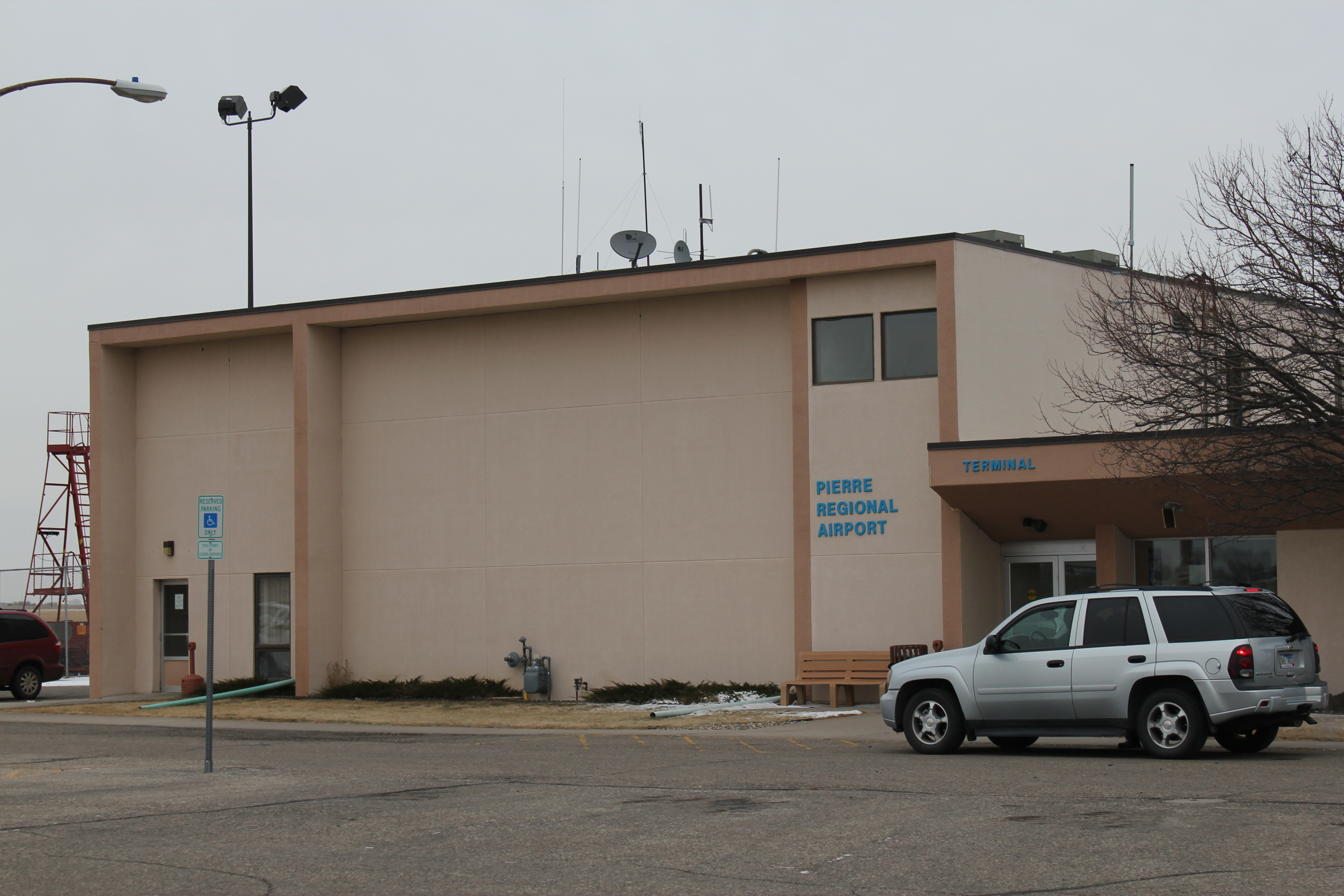
Old terminal building, demolished September 2013

Pierre Regional Airport covers 1,834 acres (742 ha) at an elevation of 1,744 feet (532 m). It has two asphalt runways: 7/25 is 6,880 by 150 feet (2,097 x 46 m) and 13/31 is 6,900 by 100 feet (2,103 x 30 m).

In the year ending September 13, 2019, the airport had 31,960 aircraft operations, average 88 per day: 70% general aviation, 5% airline, 23% air taxi and 2% military. 63 aircraft were then based at the airport: 47 single-engine, 14 multi-engine, 1 jet, and 1 helicopter.

== New terminal building ==
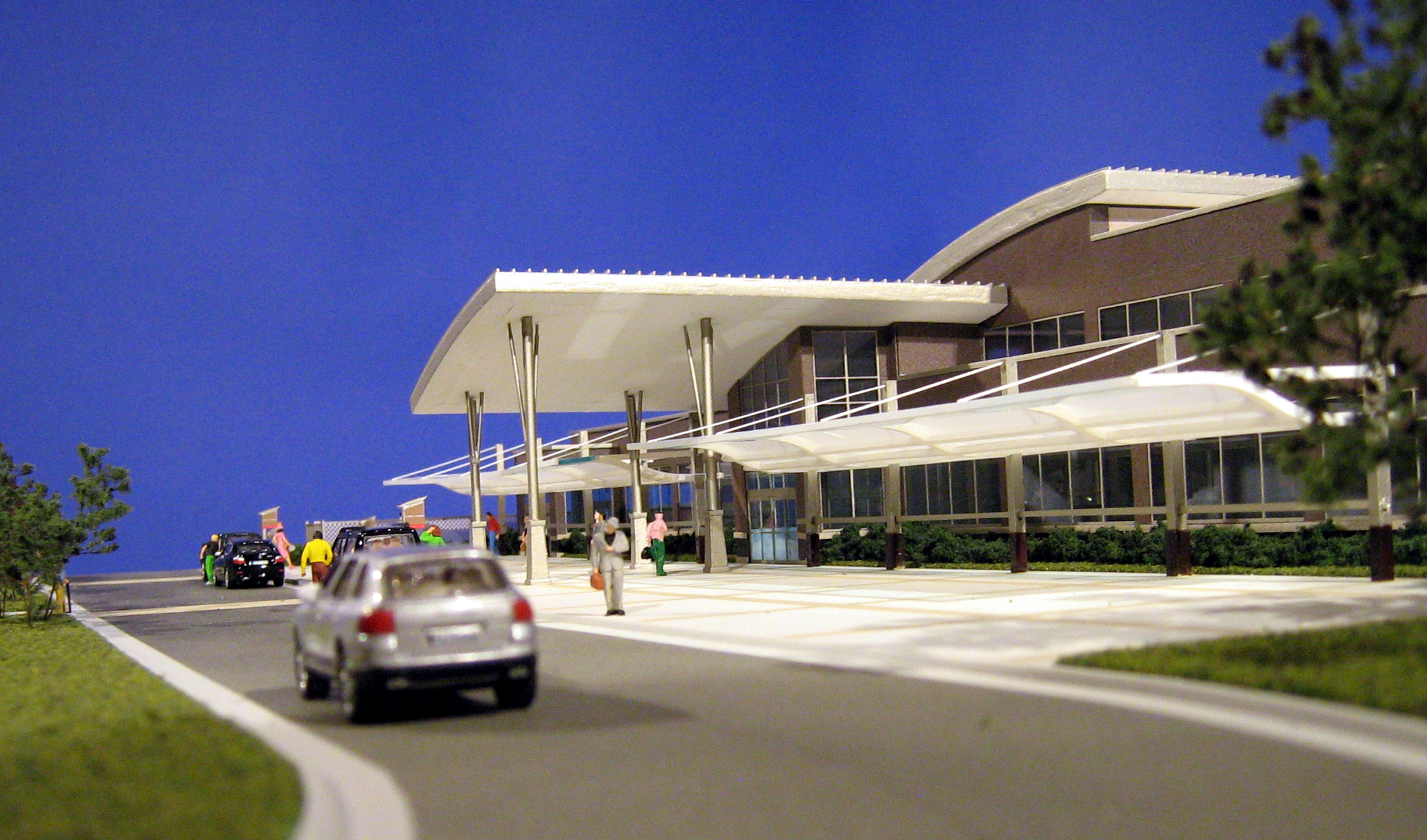
The current airport terminal building opened on September 12, 2012, a 21,000 square foot facility built by Dean Kurtz Construction.

A new terminal had been needed for many years, as the old terminal building was plagued by a number of problems, primarily space constraints. Construction on the new terminal began in late spring of 2011 and was completed in September 2012. Denver-based Coover-Clark & Associates, Inc. designed the building, and Kadrmas Lee & Jackson's Rapid City office handled the construction administration. Initially, a jet bridge was to be installed at the terminal, but airport officials decided to wait until a scheduled commercial airline could use the jet bridge, as Great Lakes Airlines aircraft serving the airport at the time were not jet bridge capable. Officials also waited because Pierre had been without scheduled passenger jet service operated with mainline aircraft for over 30 years. The new terminal building was designed with the space set aside for a loading bridge, so it required very little effort to install one when the time came.

With the introduction of jet service by Aerodynamics, Inc., in 2016, the city began considering a jet bridge for the airport. In August 2017, the Pierre city commission awarded the job of making and installing a new jet-boarding bridge to Sharpe of Pierre for its bid of $716,500. The new jet bridge was installed at the airport on April 23, 2018. A federal grant covered nearly all of the costs, with the state kicking in 5% and the city 5%, or about $45,000.

== Military use ==
During World War II, the airfield was used by the United States Army Air Forces' Air Technical Service Command as a maintenance and supply depot. It was also used by Sioux Falls Army Air Field as an auxiliary airfield for Second Air Force B-17 Flying Fortress bomber training.

== Historical airline service ==
Pierre's first airline flights were around 1935, on Watertown Airways; this was at the old airport north of town at 44.414°N 100.345°W. Inland Airlines and successor Western Airlines served the present airport from about 1938 until 1984; in the 1950s Pierre was one of six stops on a Minneapolis-Los Angeles Convair 240 flight.

North Central Airlines Douglas DC-3s arrived in 1959, flying Minneapolis/Saint Paul - Watertown, SD - Aberdeen, SD - Pierre - Rapid City - Spearfish, SD. Convair 340s, Convair 440s and Convair 580s followed.

The first jets were North Central McDonnell Douglas DC-9-30s in 1968. During the 1970s Western Boeing 737-200s flew nonstop to Rapid City and Sioux Falls with direct, no change of plane service to Denver, Salt Lake City and Los Angeles while North Central DC-9s flew nonstop to Aberdeen and Rapid City with direct service to Minneapolis/St. Paul while North Central was also still operating Convair 580 turboprops to Pierre as well.

In 1979 North Central merged with Southern Airways to form Republic Airlines which had four departures a day at Pierre flown with McDonnell Douglas DC-9-50s and Convair 580s. Republic pulled out of Pierre in 1981, and mainline jet service ended when Western left in 1984.

In 1981 Northern Airlines turboprops flew to Minneapolis/St. Paul, Rapid City, Sioux Falls and other cities. In 1984 Mesaba Airlines turboprops flew Minneapolis/Saint Paul - Sioux Falls - Pierre - Rapid City. By late 1988, two regional air carriers were serving Pierre: Continental Express operated by Rocky Mountain Airways flying ATR-42 and Beechcraft 1900 turboprops from Denver, and Northwest Airlink operated by Mesaba Airlines flying Fokker F27 turboprops from Minneapolis/St. Paul and Sioux Falls. In the fall of 1994 three commuter airlines were serving the airport: Great Lakes Airlines (operating as United Express), Mesaba Airlines (operating as Northwest Airlink) and AirVantage Airlines, an independent air carrier. Great Lakes Beechcraft 1900s flew nonstop to Denver and direct to Minneapolis/Saint Paul, and Mesaba Fairchild Swearingen Metroliner flew nonstop to Minneapolis/Saint Paul, and AirVantage Metroliners flew nonstop to Bismarck, ND, Rapid City and Sioux Falls. In summer 1999 Great Lakes Airlines (United Express) Beech 1900s flew to Denver and other cities. In 2002 Great Lakes lost its designation as a United Express carrier but continued to serve Pierre.

Until June 30, 2006 Great Lakes Airlines flights to Denver were subsidized by the Essential Air Service (EAS) program. The U.S. Department of Transportation selected Big Sky Airlines to provide service beginning July 1, 2006, but that order was suspended when Great Lakes decided to continue service without the EAS subsidy.

In 2007 Mesaba Airlines (Northwest Airlink) Saab 340s flew direct to Minneapolis/Saint Paul via Watertown, and Great Lakes flew Beechcraft 1900s nonstop to Denver as an independent airline. Following the merger of Northwest Airlines and Delta Air Lines in 2010, Delta Connection Saab 340s flew between Minneapolis/Saint Paul and Pierre. When Delta Connection ceased its Saab 340 service in December 2011, flights from Minneapolis were operated with Delta Connection Canadair Regional Jet 200 aircraft until Delta Connection pulled out of Pierre on January 31, 2012.

From 2012 to 2015, Great Lakes Airlines 19-seat Beechcraft 1900Ds (later reduced to only 9 seats) to Minneapolis/St. Paul and Denver were the only airline flights serving Pierre. Great Lakes Airlines flew via interline agreements with Delta Air Lines, Frontier Airlines and United Airlines before ceasing all service to the airport in late 2015.

On August 15, 2016, Aerodynamics, Inc. (later California Pacific Airlines) began flying to Watertown with daily service to Denver, via Pierre, using Embraer ERJ-145 regional jet aircraft. However, the airline suspended all operations nationwide and ended flights to Pierre and Watertown on January 17, 2019.

== Airlines and destinations ==
Air service to Pierre resumed on April 3, 2019, with daily flights to Denver and continuing service to Watertown. The service to Watertown eventually ended in late 2019. Service was provided by SkyWest Airlines, operating via the United Express brand on behalf of United Airlines using a 50-seat Canadair Regional Jet 200. This service is subsidized with annual funding of $3.64 million (or $49.84 per seat) from the Essential Air Service program. In April, 2021 Denver Air Connection was awarded the EAS contract against city preference, since the subsidy amount was significantly less than the SkyWest proposal. While the community, SkyWest, and United has petitioned for reconsideration, no official decision was made and SkyWest announced intention to remain in both the Pierre and Watertown markets providing 'at-risk' service. Denver Air Connection began their service to Denver on July 1, 2021, using Embraer ERJ-145 regional jets. The airline has an interline agreement with United Airlines but does not fly under the United Express brand like SkyWest. A decision was made in October 2021 that Denver Air would keep the EAS award and SkyWest ultimately ended all service to both Pierre and Watertown on January 3, 2022. Beginning in November 2023, Denver Air Connection introduced direct flights to Minneapolis, the first eastbound flights to the Twin Cities since Great Lakes Airlines ended service to Pierre in 2015. Due to low demand, the airline ended service to Minneapolis on June 9, 2024.

Denver Air Connection returned but stopped flights on May 31, 2025, with United Express returning the next day to substitute them.

Fed Ex Feeder serves the airport with cargo flights.

Airlines	Destinations
United Express	Denver

=== Cargo ===
Airlines	Destinations	Refs
FedEx Feeder operated by CSA Air	Sioux Falls	

== Statistics ==
=== Top destinations ===
Busiest domestic routes from PIR (May 2024 – April 2025)
Rank	Airport	Passengers	Airline
1	Denver, CO	14,710	Denver Air Connection

== See also ==
- South Dakota World War II Army Airfields
- List of airports in South Dakota

== Other sources ==
- Essential Air Service documents (Docket OST-2001-10128) from the U.S. Department of Transportation:
  - Notice (July 12, 2001) of Great Lakes Aviation, Ltd. to terminate scheduled air service at Pierre, South Dakota, effective October 9, 2001.
  - Order 2002-3-32 (March 29, 2002): establishes a subsidy rate for Great Lakes Aviation, Ltd., d/b/a United Express, to provide essential air service in the Pierre-Denver market at annual subsidy rates of $677,495 for the period October 10, 2001, through April 30, 2002, and $318,861 for the period May 1, 2002, through October 31, 2003.
  - Order 2004-7-5 (July 6, 2004): selects Great Lakes Aviation, Ltd. to continue subsidized essential air service at Pierre, and Air Midwest to provide subsidized essential air service at Brookings and Huron, for a two-year period. Great Lakes' service at Pierre is to be 12 weekly nonstop round trips to Denver with 19-seat Beech 1900-Ds, at an annual subsidy of $449,912. Air Midwest's service at Brookings and Huron is to be 12 weekly flights routed Huron-Brookings-Omaha-Brookings-Huron, with 19-seat Beech 1900-Ds, at an annual subsidy of $2,078,727.
  - Order 2006-5-7 (May 10, 2006): selecting Big Sky Transportation Co., d/b/a Big Sky Airlines, to provide essential air service (EAS) at Pierre, South Dakota, for the two-year period beginning July 1, 2006, at an annual subsidy rate of $379,616.
  - Order 2006-5-17 (May 19, 2006): terminating the subsidy being paid to Great Lakes Aviation, Inc. to serve Pierre, South Dakota, effective July 1, 2006 (suspends selection of Big Sky in Order 2006-5-7 since Great Lakes will continue to provide service without EAS subsidy).
