= California Mathematics Project =

K–16 network in California, United States

- The project logo features the nautilus.
- Formation: 1982
- Headquarters: California, United States
- Host Institution: University of California, Los Angeles
- Website: www.cmpso.org

The California Mathematics Project (CMP) is a network of projects held across California intended to improve teachers' and educators' understanding of mathematics and ability to teach the subject. The program currently provides support at 19 regional sites across California.

== History ==
The roots of the CMP can be traced to the Bay Area Writing Project (BAWP), a professional development project for teachers or writing. The BAWP was established in 1974 by James Grey at the University of California, Berkeley.

The CMP was created in 1982 by legislative act SB 424 (Carpenter) to "seek to solve the mathematics skills problem of students in California through cooperatively planned and funded efforts."

At that time nine sites were funded throughout the state. The University of California was vested with authority to manage and control the projects. The California Postsecondary Education Commission (CPEC) was to evaluate the projects. Judy Kysh was hired in 1984 as a part-time statewide coordinator. In 1986, it was decided that there needed to be a full-time statewide Executive Director to oversee the CMP. In 1987, CPEC commissioned a policy study to analyze the effectiveness of professional development.

Following this report, in 1989 the California legislature created a professional development program expanding the structure of the California Writing Project (CWP) and CMP to embrace nine subject areas called the California Subject Matter Projects (CSMP).

=== Past coordinators and directors ===
Statewide Coordinator	
Judy Kysh	1984–1986

Executive Directors	Statewide Office Host Institution	
Phil Daro	UC Office of the President	1986–1992
Nicholas Branca	San Diego State University	1992–1999
Susie W. Håkansson	University of California, Los Angeles	1999–present

== Current sites ==
Sites "create a professional home for teachers that is based upon a culture of inquiry, experimentation, and reflections."
