= California Bureau for Private Postsecondary Education =

Unit of the California Department of Consumer Affairs

Bureau for Private Postsecondary Education
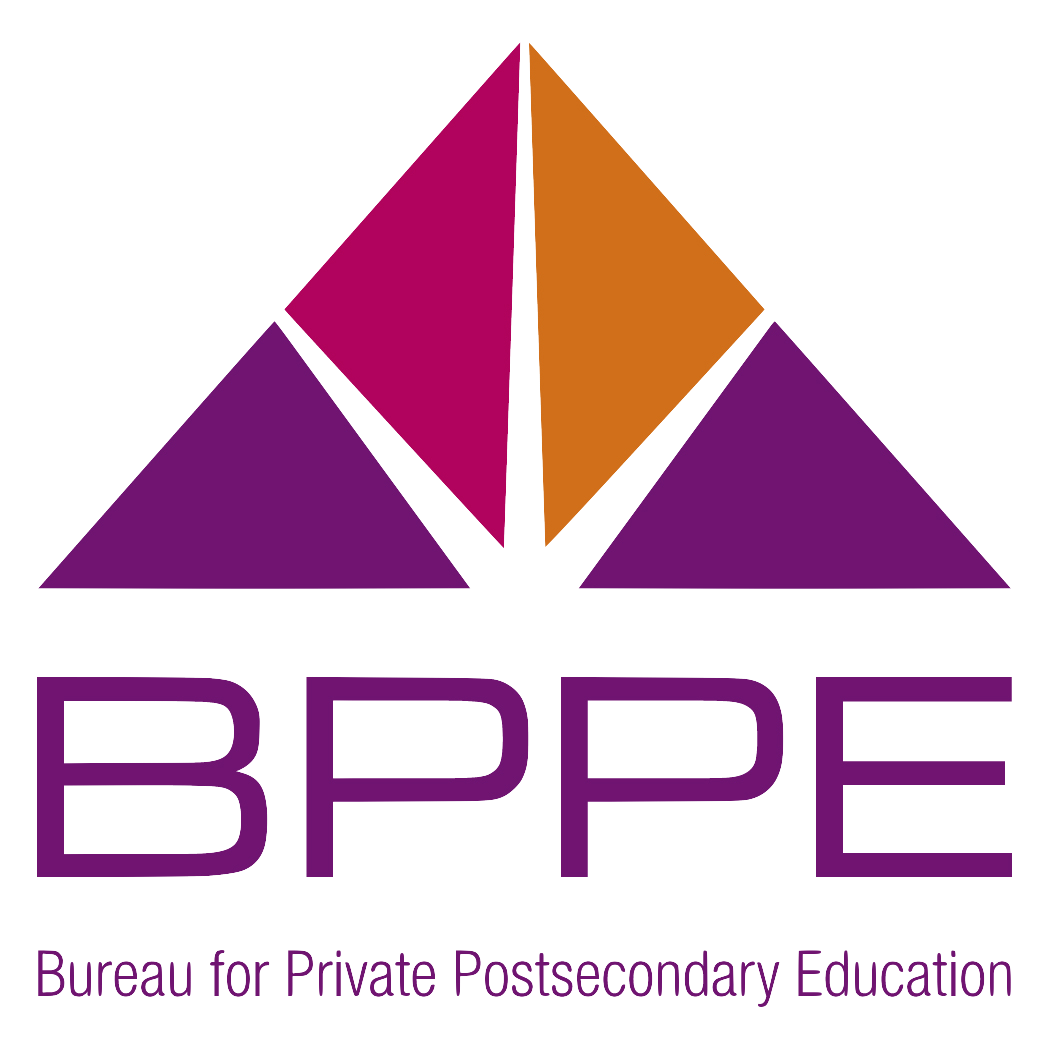

Bureau overview
- Formed: 2010
- Jurisdiction: Government of California
- Headquarters: Sacramento, California
- Bureau executive: Deborah Cochrane, Bureau Chief
- Parent department: California Department of Consumer Affairs
- Website: bppe.ca.gov

The California Bureau for Private Postsecondary Education (BPPE) is a unit of the California Department of Consumer Affairs charged with regulation of private postsecondary educational institutions operating in the state of California.

The BPPE is a regulatory agency, not an accrediting agency. Its primary purpose is to prevent fraudulent diploma mills. BPPE is an authorization for state approval and not an accreditation approval. Institutions that are approved to operate in California by the Bureau still need to separately obtain educational accreditation from national or regional accrediting body recognized by the United States Department of Education for its students to qualify for federal financial aid, such as Pell Grants.

== Purpose ==
The California Bureau of Private Postsecondary Education (BPPE) is not an accreditor, but rather approves postsecondary schools to operate in the state that meet "minimum standards established by the Bureau for integrity, financial stability, and educational quality".

The Bureau provides "oversight of California's private postsecondary educational institutions by conducting qualitative reviews of educational programs and operating standards, proactively combating unlicensed activity, impartially resolving student and consumer complaints, and conducting outreach". The Bureau conducts announced and unannounced compliance inspections, and investigates complaints about fraud.

The BPPE website includes lists of Denied Schools, Compliance Inspection Results, Disciplinary Actions etc allowing potential students and their funders to check the status of individual institutions. For example Coding House Institute has been on the Denied Schools list since 2 March 2018. The Disciplinary Actions page provides all of the formal documentation that explains the background to the denial and the legal steps taken.

== Exemptions ==
Certain institutions are exempt from BPPE oversight under the California Private Postsecondary Education Act of 2009. These exemptions include:

- Non-profit religious institutions
- Public institutions
- Certain accredited institutions

These exemptions are further outlined in California Education Code § 94874.

== History ==
Private colleges were previously regulated by the California Department of Education. Reforms, including the Maxine Waters School Reform and Student Protection Act were implemented during the late 1980s and 1990s. These laws created the California Bureau for Private Postsecondary and Vocational Education (BPPVE). The laws authorizing these reforms expired without immediate replacement, and from the start of 2007 until the end of 2009, California did not have any agency regulating private schools.

The Private Postsecondary Education Act of 2009, which was signed into law on October 11, 2009, created the BPPE as part of the Department of Consumer Affairs to regulate private postsecondary educational institutions operating in California. The BPPE began operation on January 1, 2010.

== See also ==
- California Postsecondary Education Commission
