= Susie W. Håkansson =

Mathematics educator

Susie Wong Håkansson
- Born: July 15, 1940 (age 86); Los Angeles, California
- Education: University of California, Santa Barbara
- Scientific career
- Fields: Mathematics education
- Workplaces: University of California, Los Angeles
- Doctoral advisor: Noreen Webb

Susie Wong Håkansson (born July 15, 1940) is an American educator known for her work in mathematics education, teacher preparation and professional development. Since 1999, she has been Executive Director of the California Mathematics Project.

== Life ==
Susie (Susan) Wong Håkansson is a native Southern Californian born and raised in Los Angeles. Her parents are first generation Chinese immigrants who owned a small business in the Larchmont area.

After gaining her master's degree, Håkansson taught for several years at Huntington Park High School in Los Angeles Unified School District and was involved in several projects to improve the teaching and learning of mathematics. She served as a head track and field coach and official specializing in pole vault and had the opportunity of working at the 1984 Olympics at Los Angeles. In 1984, she joined Center X in the UCLA Graduate School of Education and Information Studies and served as the site director of the UCLA Mathematics Project. She took on the position as the statewide Executive Director for the California Mathematics Project in 1999.

=== Education ===
After completing her primary schooling at Los Angeles High School, went on to receiving her bachelor's and master's degrees in mathematics, and a teaching credential from University of California, Santa Barbara, and her doctorate in education from University of California, Los Angeles. Her graduate advisor was Dr. Noreen Webb and her thesis was titled The effects of daily problem solving on problem-solving performance, attitudes towards mathematics, and mathematics achievement.

== Awards ==
- Robert Sorgenfrey Distinguished Teaching Award, UCLA, 2009
- Walter Denham Memorial Award (Advocacy for Mathematics Education), California Mathematics Council, 2009
