= California Bureau of Real Estate Appraisers =

CA Department of Consumer Affairs division

Bureau of Real Estate Appraisers
Bureau overview
- Jurisdiction: California
- Bureau executive: Jim Martin, Bureau Chief
- Parent bureau: California Department of Consumer Affairs
- Website: www.brea.ca.gov

The California Bureau of Real Estate Appraisers (BREA) is a division of the California Department of Consumer Affairs responsible for real estate appraiser licensing and certification in California.

== Activities ==
The California Real Estate Act has two core components: licensing and enforcement. Both licensing and enforcement functions are required by the Appraisal Subcommittee (ASC), the federal government organization which oversees all state real estate appraiser licensing agencies.

=== Enforcement ===
The enforcement unit, operates under a federal mandate, and ensures adherence to the federally required Uniform Standards of Professional Appraisal Practice (USPAP), California law and regulations.

=== Licensing ===
In order to be issued an appraisal license, BREA requires applicants to meet all the criteria established by the Appraisal Qualifications Board (AQB) of the Appraisal Foundation.

Regulations require the application for a real estate appraiser license to include their social security number. Pursuant to SB 237, the licensing Unit also performs background checks on appraisal management companies in order to register them as required.

=== Accreditation ===
BREA is responsible for the accreditation of educational courses and providers for real estate appraisers and has reviewed and approved over 1,800 pre-licensing and continuing education courses. In addition to the real estate appraisal related courses offered by the community college, University of California, and California State University systems, over 90 proprietary schools provide appraiser education.

== Laws and regulations ==
In response to Title XI of the Financial Institutions Reform, Recovery, and Enforcement Act of 1989 (FIRREA), the California Legislature enacted the Real Estate Appraisers Licensing and Certification Law in 1990 as an amendment to the Real Estate Law. State regulations are codified at Chapter 6.5, Title 10 of the California Code of Regulations (10 CCR §§ 3500 et seq.), and federal regulations are included in Regulation Y (12 CFR 225) and Regulation Z (12 CFR 226).

A new Regulation Z (12 CFR 226) of the Truth in Lending Act was adopted in 2008 (73 FR 44522) to help prevent the improper influence of appraisers and to reduce the chances that appraisers would be pressured to "hit" certain target property values or return pre-determined, unsupported valuations when appraising real property.

== See also ==
- California Bureau of Real Estate
