= Coding House =

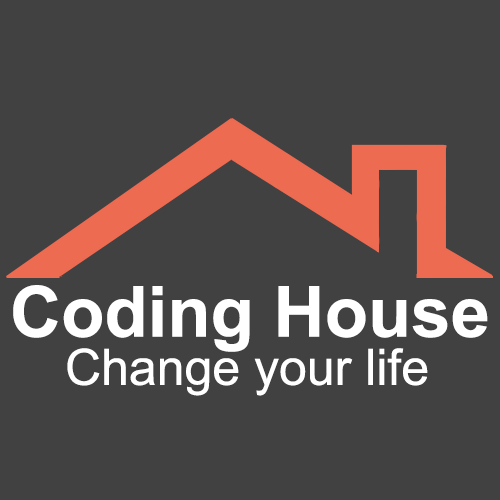
- Silicon Valley, California; United States

Information
- Type: Private
- Motto: Change your life
- Established: 2014
- Founders: Nicholas James
- Closed: 2016
- Campus: Urban
- Accreditation: None
- Website: codinghouse.co

Coding House was a coding bootcamp in Silicon Valley, California. The 14-week-long bootcamp taught students JavaScript and other technologies. Founded in 2014 by Nicholas James, it was ordered shut down in November 2016 by the regulatory agency California Bureau for Private Postsecondary Education (BPPE) for violating California law many times. BPPE denied Coding House's licensing application three times and found that Coding House had engaged in false advertising.

== History ==
=== Foundation ===
Coding House was founded in 2014 by Nicholas James. Based in Silicon Valley, California, the bootcamp operated in two places in Fremont, California and then in a place in Pleasanton, California. Coding House held 14-week-long bootcamps in which students would live on campus while learning the curriculum. The bootcamp cost $6,000 for the live-in costs and 18% of the graduate's initial year of salary. It focused on teaching students JavaScript and other technologies. In 2014, online lending marketplace Upstart offered loans for students attending bootcamps like Coding House.

In September 2016, Coding House mandated that students sign non-disparagement contracts disallowing them from either publicly or privately criticizing the school. If Coding House determined that students had originated damaging information about it, Coding House vowed to take action against the students.

=== Shutdown ===
The California Bureau for Private Postsecondary Education (BPPE), which is tasked with regulating California coding schools, declined to add Coding House to its list of approved programs. It first warned Coding House in a cease and desist in January 2014 that it was unlicensed to operate as a coding bootcamp. BPPE rejected Coding House's applications in November 2015, in June 2016, and on November 4, 2016. On November 7, 2016, the BPPE levied a $50,000 fine on Coding House founder Nicholas James and mandated that James close the school. BPPE further decreed that Coding House reimburse every single student who had enrolled in the school. Coding House filed an appeal but discontinued classes in the meantime.

Coding House Institute is on the Denied Schools list section of the BPPE website. The Disciplinary Actions page of the BPPE website provides all of the formal documentation that explains the background to the denial and the legal steps taken.

BPPE shut the school down because it found Coding House had committed many contraventions of California law. BPPE determined that Coding House had engaged in false advertising. Coding House said on its website that 95% of its alumni received employment by two months after completing the curriculum and that their average starting salary was $91,000. However, BPPE found that just 57 of Coding House's 70 graduates had provided details about their jobs and salaries. The school had 21 companies in a "Where Our Graduates Work Now" part of its website. However, BPPE determined from an analysis of Coding House's records that just two alumni had been hired by any of the 21 companies. BPPE ruled that Coding House contravened home-occupation permit rules by functioning in residential neighborhoods. BPPE additionally found that at Coding House a male student had sexually assaulted a female student while people were drinking alcohol.
