= California Board of Accountancy =

American government agency

- Official logo

Board overview
- Formed: 1901
- Jurisdiction: California
- Headquarters: Sacramento, California
- Employees: 105
- Annual budget: $19.9 million (2024)
- Board executives: Joseph Rosenbaum, CPA, President; Dominic Franzella, Executive Officer
- Parent board: California Department of Consumer Affairs
- Website: www.dca.ca.gov/cba/

The California Board of Accountancy (CBA), created by statute in 1901, is a semi-autonomous State of California agency under the California Department of Consumer Affairs whose purpose is to protect consumers by ensuring only qualified licensees practice public accountancy in accordance with established professional standards in California.

The CBA currently regulates over 5,000 firms and nearly 81,000 Certified Public Accountant (CPA) licensees, the largest group of licensed accounting professionals in the nation. The agency is unique in California in its authority to license and discipline not only individuals but also firms including partnerships and corporations. Its mandate is to regulate the accounting profession for the protection of the public by establishing and maintaining standards of qualification and conduct within the profession. It fulfills this mandate primarily through its authority to license.

== History ==
The California Board of Accountancy (CBA) was established in 1901 in San Francisco. All the records were destroyed in the 1906 San Francisco earthquake and fire, including all the documents of the first 65 licensees. The secretary-treasurer of the CBA was able to reconstruct the records by corresponding with each of the licensees.

In 1929, the CBA became part of the Department of Professional and Vocational Standards. In 1971 it was moved to the California Department of Consumer Affairs and subsequently moved to Sacramento.

== Functions ==
The CBA protects California consumers by performing several functions. First, it ensures candidates are qualified to take the Uniform Certified Public Accountant Examination (CPA Exam). Once a candidate has passed the CPA Exam, completed any additional educational requirements, and fulfilled certain experience requirements, the CBA will issue a CPA license. The CBA renews that license every two years provided the licensee has met specified continuing education requirements. The CBA also registers CPA partnerships and corporations. The CBA ensures licensee compliance with the law through its Enforcement Division. It receives and investigates complaints and takes enforcement action against licensees for violation of CBA statutes and regulations.

The above functions are carried out by various units and divisions within the CBA.

- The Examination Unit ensures that only candidates who meet certain qualifications are able to take the Uniform CPA Examination.
- The Initial Licensing Unit ensures that only those who have passed the Uniform CPA Examination and meet the appropriate education and experience requirements are issued licenses to practice public accountancy in California.
- The Renewal and Continuing Competency Unit ensures that only licensees who have met specific continuing education requirements are allowed to continue practicing public accountancy in California.
- The Practice Privilege Unit ensures that the CBA is aware of out-of-state firms that are performing attest work in California.
- The Enforcement Division ensures that practicing licensees in California are held to the highest standards, both professional and ethical.

== Peer review ==
On January 1, 2010, a new law, AB 138 (Chapter 312 of 2009), took effect in California requiring all accounting firms providing accounting and auditing services to undergo a mandatory peer review. A peer review is a study of a firm's accounting and auditing work, performed by an unaffiliated CPA following professional standards. Tax practice is not required to be monitored by peer review. The CBA's peer review program is designed to equip firms to deliver high quality accounting and auditing services to consumers and assist in designing quality control systems to ensure that work products meet professional standards; provide firms an opportunity to learn new or better ways to improve services; and give consumers an extra measure of assurance by knowing the CPA firm they hire has successfully completed a peer review and meets the profession's standards. Firms that fail their peer review are required to report that fact to the CBA.

== Board ==
The 15-member board is composed of seven CPA licensees and eight public members. The Governor appoints four of the public members and all seven of the licensees. The Senate Rules Committee and the Speaker of the Assembly each appoint two public members. In appointing the seven licensees, the Governor must appoint at least two licensee members who represent small accounting firms. Each member of the CBA is appointed to a four-year term and may only serve two consecutive terms.

The CBA is currently made up of the following membership:

- Joseph Rosenbaum, CPA
- Yen Tu, President
- Kristian Latta, CPA, Vice President
- Doug Aguilera, CPA, Secretary/Treasurer
- Patricia Batchelor, CPA
- Nancy J. Corrigan, CPA
- Nancy Duong
- Karriann Farrell Hinds, Esq.
- Yanira Guzmán
- Tony Lin
- Bruce Raful
- Theresa N. Thompson, CPA
- Evangeline Ward

The CBA board currently has two vacancies.

The CBA appointed Dominic Franzella as its Executive Officer in August 2023.
