= California Contractors State License Board =

Licensing board in the United States

Contractors State License Board
Board overview
- Formed: 1929; 97 years ago
- Jurisdiction: California
- Headquarters: Sacramento, California
- Board executives: David R. Fogt, Registrar of Contractors; David De La Torre, Chair; Susan Granzella, Vice Chair
- Parent department: California Department of Consumer Affairs
- Website: www.cslb.ca.gov

The California Contractors State License Board (CSLB) was established in 1929 as the Contractors License Bureau under the Department of Professional and Vocational Standards. Today it is part of the California Department of Consumer Affairs (DCA).

The CSLB licenses and regulates contractors in 44 classifications that constitute the construction industry.

As of December 31, 2020, there were 229,909 "Active" licenses registered under the 44 different classifications of the CSLB licensing system. The CSLB also registers Home Improvement Salespersons (HIS). As of December 31, 2020, there were 22,020 active HIS.

The top 10 licensing classifications, in order of licenses issued by CSLB on December 31, 2020, are:

Rank	Classification	Active licenses	Inactive licenses	Total
1	B-General Building	103,223	29,675	132,898
2	C-10 Electrical	25,875	6,339	32,214
3	C-36 Plumbing	15,859	3,230	19,089
4	A-General Engineering	14,780	4,300	19,080
5	C-33 Painting and Decorating	15,766	2,393	18,159
6	C-20 Warm Air Heating, Ventilating, and Air Conditioning	12,294	2,312	14,606
7	C-27 Landscaping	11,749	2,120	13,869
8	C-15 Flooring and Floor Covering	7,222	963	8,185
9	C-8 Concrete	6,329	1,355	7,684
10	C-54 Ceramic and Mosaic Tile	6,580	848	7,428

A 15-member board appoints CSLB's executive officer, or registrar of contractors, and directs administrative policy for the agency's operations. This Board includes five contractors, one member of a labor organization representing building trades, one active local building official, and eight public members, one who must be from a statewide senior citizen organization. Appointments to the board are made by the Governor of California and the California State Legislature.

The registrar oversees approximately 400 employees, who are distributed among the headquarters office in Sacramento and field offices throughout the state.

CSLB's headquarters office receives and processes applications for new licenses, additional classifications, changes of license records, and license renewals. Headquarters staff reviews and maintains records of disciplinary actions initiated by the regional offices and provides other support services. This office also provides the verified certificates of licensure used in court or other actions. The status of licensure is also made available. Headquarters directs the activities of its field offices and initiates all disciplinary actions resulting from their investigations. Field office staff investigates consumer complaints against licensed and unlicensed contractors. In fiscal year 2019–20, CSLB obtained more than $58 million in ordered restitution for consumers.

CSLB's Statewide Investigative Fraud Team (SWIFT) focuses on the underground economy and on unlicensed contractors. This unit conducts sting operations and sweeps to help reduce illegal contracting by citing those who are not licensed or insured for workers' compensation. SWIFT averages one undercover sting or sweep operation per week somewhere in California.

CSLB holds regularly scheduled, quarterly public meetings throughout the state. These meetings provide the public an opportunity to testify on agenda items and other issues.

== Mission statement ==
The Contractors State License Board protects consumers by regulating the construction industry through policies that promote the health, safety, and general welfare of the public in matters relating to construction.

The Contractors State License Board will accomplish this by:

- Ensuring that construction is performed in a safe, competent, and professional manner;
- Licensing contractors and enforcing licensing laws;
- Requiring that any person practicing or offering to practice construction contracting be licensed;
- Enforcing the laws, regulations, and standards governing construction contracting in a fair and uniform manner;
- Providing resolution to disputes that arise from construction activities; and
- Educating consumers so that they make informed choices.

== History ==
The California Contractors State License Board (CSLB) and its investigator, Amanda Martinez, are involved in ongoing litigation in both federal and California state courts.

Federal Court: Minor et al. v. Flores et al., U.S. District Court, Eastern District of California, Case No. 2:25-cv-02592-TLN-CKD (PS).

State Court: Minor et al. v. Contractors State License Board et al., Sacramento County Superior Court, Case No. 25CV021164.

Both cases involve allegations concerning investigative conduct, evidence handling, and preservation of records.

The Contractors State License Board (CSLB) follows a long history of consumer protection and licensing in California. Consumer protection began in 1876 when California passed the Medical Practice Act which would use licensing to combat completely unregulated medical practice. It was within the interests of practiced and professional doctors to separate themselves from medical fraud or "irregular" doctors.

In 1929, this and other sprouting, independent licensing agencies would be absorbed into the Department of Vocational and Professional Standards along with a newly established Contractor's License Board. These boards were largely created by their regulated industries and members were composed of licensees until the 1960s. To promote oversight, the Consumer Affairs Act of 1970 created the Department of Consumer Affairs (DCA) but lacked an adequate budget to do so. State boards were created to protect the interests of professionals and respectively protect consumers by setting industry standards. The DCA, with its objectives to educate consumers, protect them from deception in the marketplace, foster competition, and promote their interest in all levels of government, would inevitably butt heads against the different state boards it would oversee. For example, lobbying groups have successfully maintained the strength of many bureaus and boards that would have otherwise been eliminated or combined under the DCA.

== Roles and Tasks ==
The CSLB website home page claims, "The Contractors State License Board (CSLB) protects California consumers by licensing and regulating the state's construction industry… and today licenses about 290,000 contractors in 44 different classifications." To complete this objective, the CSLB requires anyone charging over $500 to be licensed and bonded. The agency licenses individuals who are 18 years or older and can show verifiable proof of 4 years of experience at the journey level or as a foreman, supervisor, or contractor for the sought classification within 10 years of the application. The individual may run their own contractor business or work as a qualifying individual (QI) to qualify another company for license. To be licensed, they must have:

- Completed examination application and $330 fee
- California business license and Tax ID (if LLC or Corporation)
- Fingerprinting Live Scan
- Completion of "Law and Business" exam
- Completion of secondary trade-related exam
- Completion of the asbestos open-book examination
- Initial licensing fee of $200
- Contractor bond or cash deposit of $15,000
- Bond of QI (if applicable) of $12,500
- Certificate of Workers’ Compensation Insurance or Certification of Self-Insurance of Workers’ Compensation from the Department of Industrial Relations
- LLC Employee/Worker Bond (if applicable)
- LLC liability insurance (if applicable)

Bonds may be provided by a surety company which is licensed by the California Department of Insurance and can cost a premium of $250-$2,250 depending on calculated risk for the required $15,000 bond. The CLSB's contractor license classifications are broken down into four categories: A-General Engineering, B-General Building, C-Specialty Classifications, C-61 / D-Limited Specialty Classifications.
