= California Bureau of Automotive Repair =

Bureau of Automotive Repair
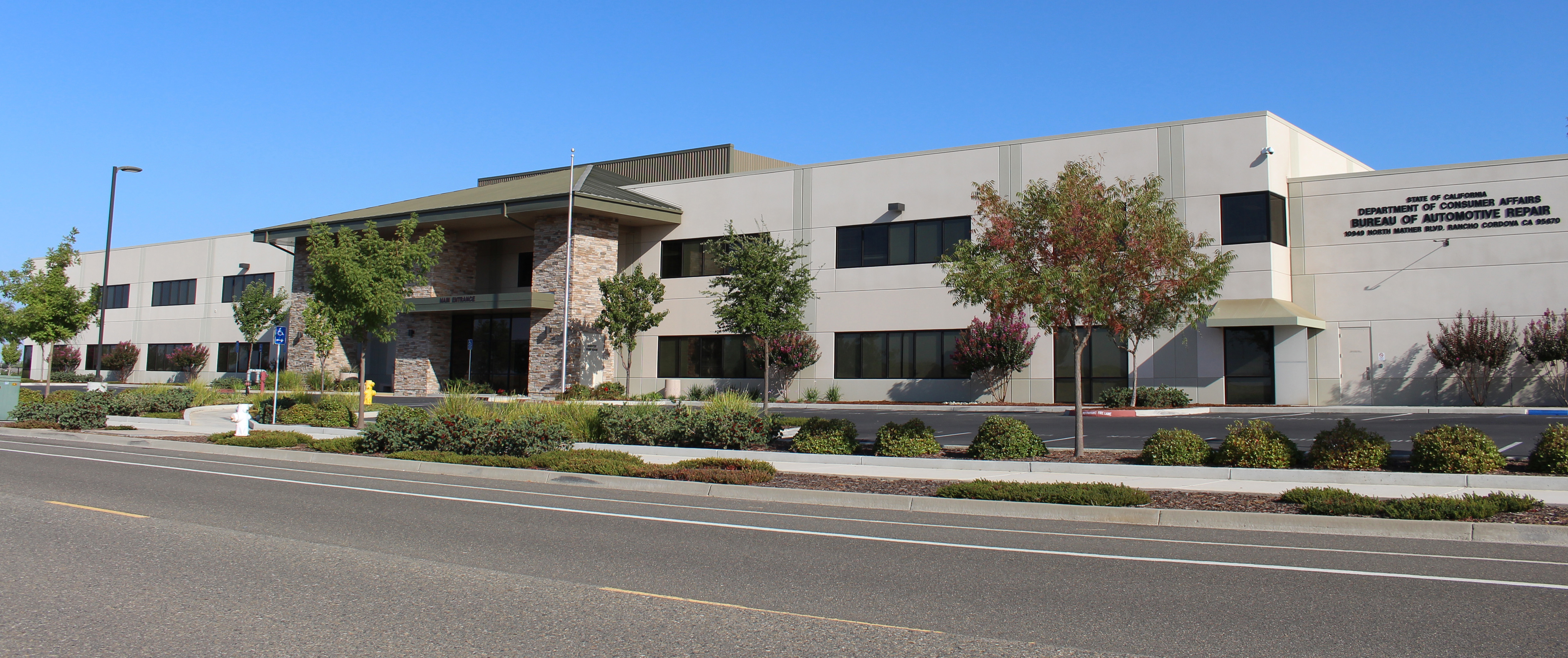
- BAR headquarters in Rancho Cordova

Bureau overview
- Formed: 1972
- Jurisdiction: California
- Headquarters: Rancho Cordova, California
- Bureau executive: Patrick Dorais; Bureau Chief
- Parent department: California Department of Consumer Affairs
- Website: www.bar.ca.gov

The Bureau of Automotive Repair (BAR) is part of the California Department of Consumer Affairs (DCA), whose mission is to promote and protect the interests of California consumers. BAR provides a wide range of consumer protection services, including:

- Registers and regulates approximately 36,000 California automotive repair dealers.
- Licenses Smog Check stations, technicians, and inspectors.
- Licenses brake and lamp stations and adjusters.
- Mediates automotive repair complaints, saving California consumers millions of dollars each year in the form of direct refunds, rework, and bill adjustments.
- Investigates and takes disciplinary action against licensees who violate the law.
- Administers and enforces the Smog Check Program.
- Helps to keep California’s air clean by reducing air pollution produced by motor vehicles.

== History ==
BAR was established within DCA in 1972 following enactment of the Automotive Repair Act (Act) of 1971. In response to consumer and industry concerns about fraud and incompetence in the automotive repair industry, the Act established BAR as the licensing and regulating authority over automotive repair dealers. The Act also gave BAR authority to license and regulate stations and individuals that perform services in the areas of lamp and brake inspection and repair. In 1982, California became the 20th state in the nation to adopt a vehicle inspection and maintenance (Smog Check) program. BAR became the administrator of the California Smog Check Program in 1984.

== Consumer Programs ==
- Consumer Assistance Program (CAP) offers repair assistance and retirement options to consumers whose vehicles fail a Smog Check.
- STAR Program certifies stations that meet higher performance standards for inspecting high-emitting vehicles in the Smog Check Program.
- Referee Program assists consumers with Smog Check inspection disputes, inspections of unusual vehicles, and locating hard-to-find emissions parts.
- Auto Body Inspection Program offers no-cost inspections to consumers to verify that collision-related repairs were performed correctly.
