= California Pacific Airlines =

American regional airline

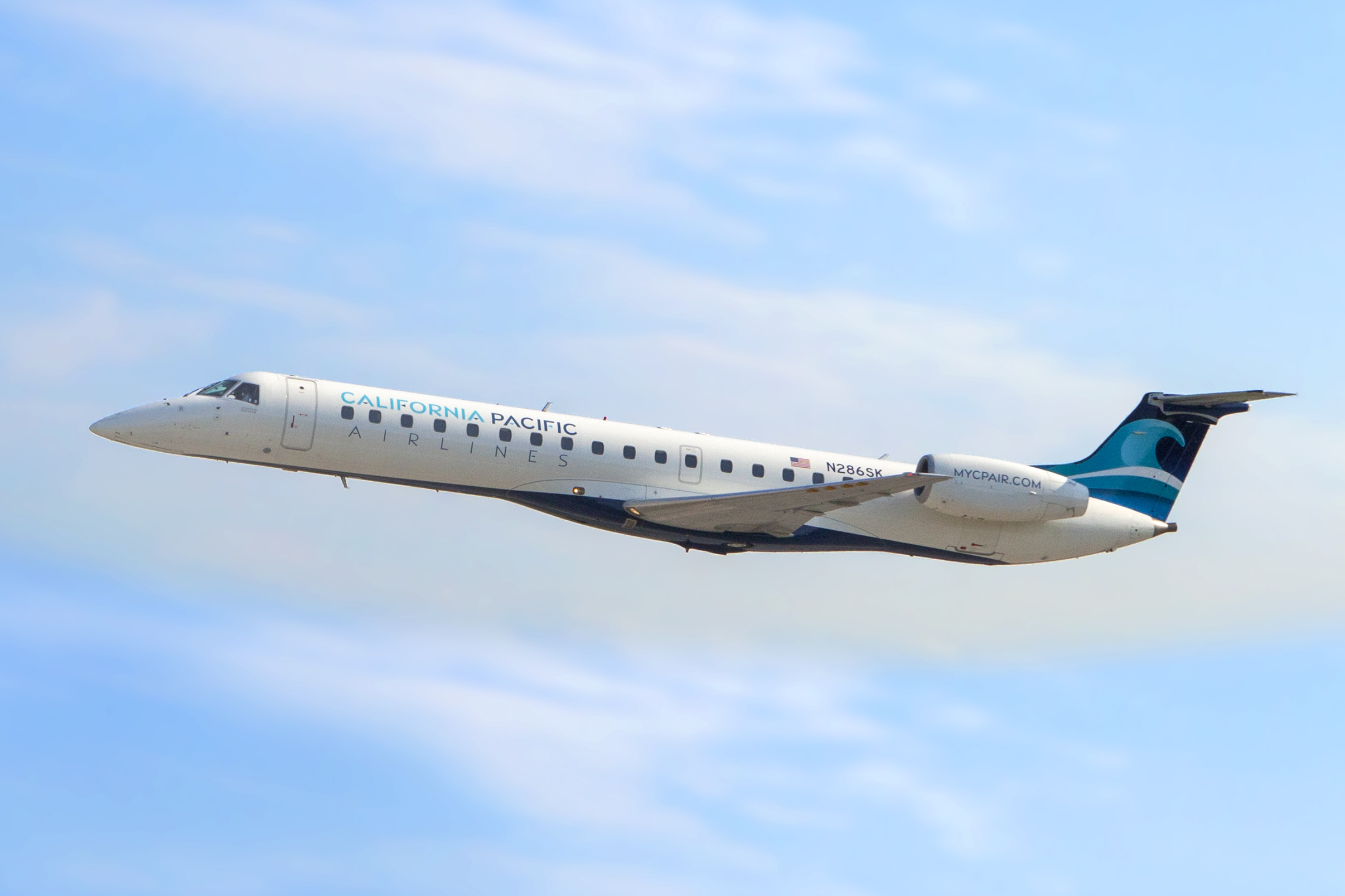
IATA	ICAO	Call sign
4A	DYN	AERODYNAMICS
- Founded: April 1, 2009; 17 years ago
- Commenced operations: November 1, 2018; 7 years ago
- Ceased operations: January 17, 2019; 7 years ago
- AOC #: BUEA634C
- Operating bases: McClellan-Palomar Airport
- Fleet size: 4
- Destinations: 8 (suspended)
- Headquarters: McClellan-Palomar Airport; Carlsbad, California, U.S.
- Key people: Ted Vallas (Founder) & (Chairman)

California Pacific Airlines (a.k.a. CP Air) was an American regional airline that was headquartered on the grounds of McClellan-Palomar Airport in Carlsbad, California. On December 28, 2018, CP Air announced it was suspending operations in California. In January 2019 the airline ceased all operations. After several failed attempts at restructuring, the airline's air operating certificate was terminated in October 2020. Owner Ted Vallas died the following month in November.

== History ==
=== Foundation and operations ===
The airline was founded in 2009 by Ted Vallas, a San Diego County businessperson from the North County area. Vallas had previously operated Air Resorts Airlines and wanted to create a San Diego County-based airline. He picked Palomar Airport as a hub, since it had moderate demand but infrequent scheduled service. Vallas invested about $14 million in seed money, with plans to raise up to $32 million more from private investment.

From 2009 to 2017, the airline struggled to achieve certification from the FAA as well as attempts to secure a fleet and routes. By February 6, 2012, California Pacific had passed Phase I of the FAA's formal Part 121 certification process, but their progress slowed due to a lack of available aircraft to lease or buy. A breakthrough eventually came at the end of 2017, when the airline acquired Aerodynamics Inc. (ADI), a small Essential Air Service (EAS) carrier. This purchase gave them full FAA certification, a fleet of four Embraer ERJ 145 regional jets, and a nearly-expired EAS contract between Denver International Airport and Pierre and Watertown, South Dakota.

During 2018, the company renewed their EAS contract, gained permission from San Diego County to operate commercial services, and scheduled their first routes. The airline formally began its first commercial service in November 2018, with nonstop flights between McCllelan-Palomar Airport in Carlsbad, California, and several destinations in the southwestern United States. However, there were numerous cancellations in November and December, giving the airline a bad reputation among passengers. The airline blamed the cancellations on a pilot shortage. The airline also gained a bad reputation for numerous cancellations and delays due to mechanical issues.

=== Closure and attempted restart ===
In December 2018, California Pacific Airlines announced that it was temporarily suspending its West Coast flight operations. The carrier's EAS operations were not affected. In January 2019, the EAS operations were shut down as well, leaving South Dakota cities Pierre (the capital) and Watertown without any commercial air service. Eventually, these routes were ceded to SkyWest Airlines operating for United Express, definitively ending the former ADI routes. Employees were all put on indefinite furlough January 18; anonymous employees said that they were not paid for the last half of December or for January, and that their health insurance premiums had not been paid for three months.

On February 28, 2019, Vallas stated that he had secured private investment to restart the airline in some capacity, and that operations could resume "within 90-120 days," with plans to abandon EAS flying altogether and take on additional second-hand Embraer ERJ regional jets to help mitigate the risk of mechanical issues which plagued the airline during its initial operation. On May 9, talks began to sell a majority stake in the airline to Paragon Partners, an investment firm led by former Virgin America executive Robert Nisi. On January 3, 2020, the airline filed paperwork to formally restart service, with flights to be operated using an all-Embraer regional jet fleet. The exact date operations would start under the new certificate remained undetermined. As of June 2020, a Federal District Court in Oregon ruled after trial that Vallas failed to pay ADI's former owner for the airline. In October 2020, the U.S. Department of Transportation issued an order permanently revoking the airline's air operating certificate after denying their request for a third consecutive waiver of dormancy. Owner Ted Vallas died of heart failure on November 13 of that year.

== Destinations ==
Commercial Destinations (Suspended)
City	State	IATA	ICAO	Airport
Phoenix	Arizona	AZA	KIWA	Phoenix–Mesa Gateway Airport
Carlsbad	California	CLD	KCRQ	McClellan–Palomar Airport (hub)
San Jose	California	SJC	KSJC	San Jose International Airport
Las Vegas	Nevada	LAS	KLAS	McCarran International Airport
Reno	Nevada	RNO	KRNO	Reno–Tahoe International Airport

Essential Air Service Destinations (Terminated)
City	State	IATA	ICAO	Airport
Denver	Colorado	DEN	KDEN	Denver International Airport (hub)
Pierre	South Dakota	PIR	KPIR	Pierre Regional Airport
Watertown	South Dakota	ATY	KATY	Watertown Regional Airport

== Fleet ==
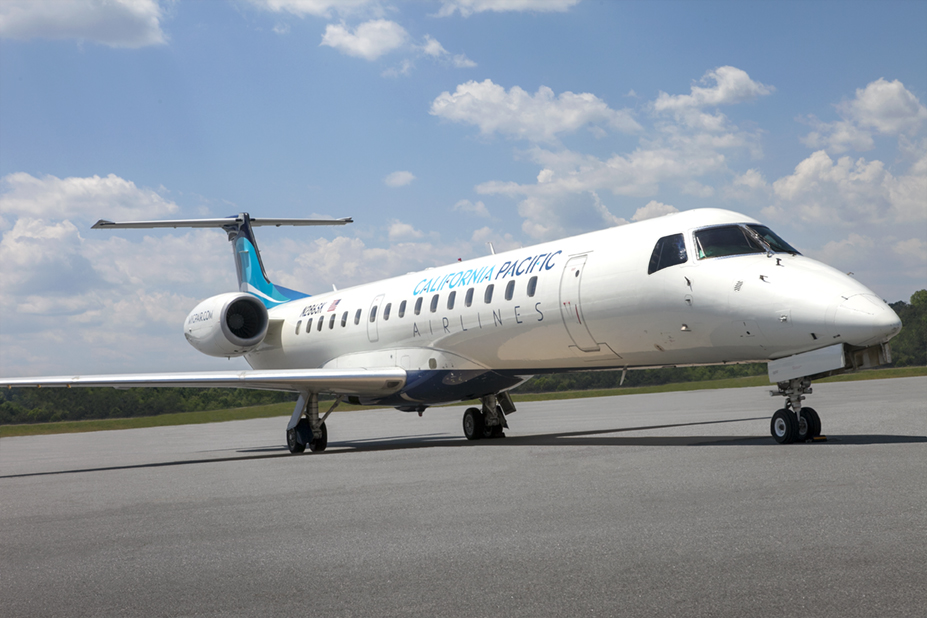
California Pacific Airlines 2018 livery on the Embraer ERJ 145

Former
Aircraft	In service	Orders	Passengers	Notes
Embraer ERJ-135	0	1	30	Delivery was expected by Q3 2019
Embraer ERJ-145	4	2	50	4 inherited from ADI
Embraer ERJ-170	1	0	72	Subleased from 2012 to 2013, didn't fly commercially

== See also ==
- List of defunct airlines of the United States
- Air transportation in the United States
