= Watertown Regional Airport =

Airport in South Dakota, United States of America

Watertown Regional Airport (former Watertown Army Airfield)

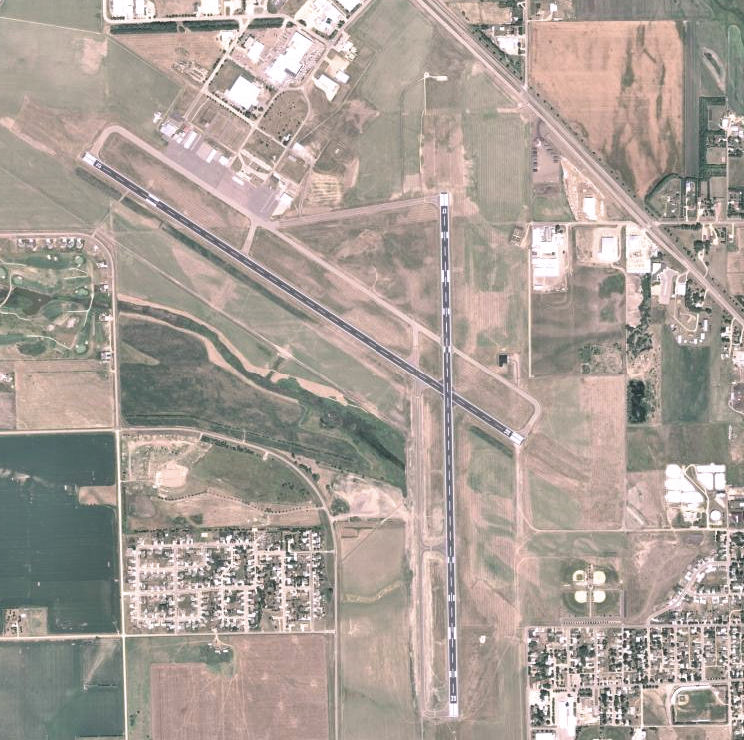
- 2006 orthophoto of the airport
- IATA: ATY; ICAO: KATY; FAA LID: ATY

Summary
- Airport type: Public
- Owner: City of Watertown
- Serves: Watertown, South Dakota, U.S.
- Elevation AMSL: 1,749 ft / 533 m
- Coordinates: 44°54′50″N 097°09′17″W
- Website: www.watertownsd.us/171/Airport

Maps
- 2025 FAA diagram

Runways
Direction	Length		Surface
Direction	ft	m	Surface
12/30	6,898	2,103	Concrete
17/35	6,893	2,101	Concrete

Statistics (2022)
- Aircraft operations: 12,276
- Based aircraft: 52
- Source: Federal Aviation Administration

Watertown Regional Airport (IATA: ATY, ICAO: KATY, FAA LID: ATY), formerly Watertown Municipal Airport, is two miles northwest of Watertown in Codington County, South Dakota, United States.

The National Plan of Integrated Airport Systems for 2015–2019 categorized it as a non-primary commercial service facility. Federal Aviation Administration data says it had 4,348 passenger boardings (enplanements) in calendar year 2013, a decrease of 30.5% from 6,254 enplanements in 2012.

== History ==
During World War II, the airfield was used by the United States Army Air Forces as a Second Air Force cold weather bomber training base as an auxiliary to Sioux Falls Army Air Field, and by Air Proving Ground Command.

B-17 Flying Fortress and B-24 Liberator units underwent advanced training before going overseas. One unit that trained here was the 702d Bombardment Squadron of the 445th Bombardment Group.

== Facilities ==
The airport covers 919 acres (372 ha) at an elevation of 1,749 feet (533 m). It has two runways: 12/30 is 6,898 by 100 feet (2,103 x 30 m) concrete and 17/35 is 6,893 by 100 feet (2,101 x 30 m) concrete.

In the year ending December 31, 2022 the airport had 12,276 aircraft operations, average 34 per day: 89% general aviation, 6% airline, and 5% air taxi. 52 aircraft were then based at the airport; 43 single-engine, 4 multi-engine, 3 jet, and 2 glider.

From 2012 to 2018, runways 17/35 and 12/30 were overhauled using concrete, replacing worn out asphalt on both runways.

The airport opened its new, state-of-the-art passenger terminal August 10, 2022. The new terminal has two levels, two gates and a movable jet bridge.

The airport has free parking.

== Notable visitors ==
President Barack Obama landed at the airport twice, first in 2008 during his presidential campaign, and on May 8, 2015, to address the graduating class of 2015 from Lake Area Technical Institute. Both times, President Obama arrived on a Boeing 757, during his campaign, on a chartered North American Airlines 757, and as president, using a smaller version of Air Force One (the Boeing C-32).

== Airlines and destinations ==
As of August 2025, daily air service to Watertown is provided by SkyWest Airlines operating as both Delta Connection and United Express, with Delta flying to Minneapolis using a CRJ-550 and United flying to Denver using a CRJ-200.

Airlines	Destinations
Delta Connection	Minneapolis/St. Paul
United Express	Denver

=== Historical airline service ===
Airline flights at Watertown started about 1935, with a local company, Watertown Airways, operating scheduled service between Minneapolis–St. Paul International Airport and Watertown. This route continued through South Dakota with additional stops in Huron, Pierre, Phillip, Rapid City, and Spearfish. By 1938, Mid-Continent Airlines was operating a route from Minneapolis-St. Paul to Omaha, Nebraska, with Watertown as one of the intermediate stops. Upon the 1952 acquisition of Mid-Continent by Braniff International, Braniff took over the operation of this route until 1959. North Central Airlines arrived in 1957, replacing Braniff International. North Central merged to become Republic Airlines in 1979 and left Watertown in 1985. The first jet flights were North Central DC-9s in 1968 flying a Minneapolis-Watertown-Aberdeen-Pierre-Rapid City route. By the late 1970's, North Central was operating the larger DC-9-50 version.

Mesaba Airlines, operating as Northwest Airlink, and later, Delta Connection, served Watertown for years, with daily Saab 340s to Minneapolis/St. Paul. When Delta quit using the Saab 340 in December 2011, and announced the end of air service to Watertown, flights from Minneapolis temporarily used Delta's Canadair Regional Jet 200, until Great Lakes Airlines took over 4 months later.

Great Lakes Airlines offered daily non-stop 19-seat (later 9-seat) Beechcraft 1900Ds to Minneapolis/St. Paul, until city officials voted to end the service, citing unreliability of the airline. Great Lakes ended service to the airport on September 30, 2015.

On August 15, 2016, Aerodynamics, Inc. (later California Pacific Airlines) began flying to Watertown with daily service to Denver, via Pierre, using Embraer 145 jet aircraft. However, the airline suspended all operations nationwide and ended flights to Pierre and Watertown on January 17, 2019.

Air service to Watertown resumed on April 3, 2019, with SkyWest Airlines operating as United Express, using 50-seat Canadair Regional Jet 200s. $3.24 million (or $44.44 per seat) of annual funding from the Essential Air Service program for flights to Denver ended on June 30, 2021. Denver Air Connection was selected for a new contract starting July 1, 2021; at that time, SkyWest also announced their intentions to remain in the Pierre and Watertown markets. SkyWest ended service to Watertown in January 2022 and returned in August 2025.

From July 2021 to August 2025, air service was provided by Denver Air Connection using 50-seat Embraer ERJ-145ERs, with daily flights to Chicago and Denver.

Sun Country Airlines flew several seasonal charter Boeing 737-800s to Laughlin/Bullhead City International Airport in Arizona, known as "casino or gamblers' flights," in coordination with travel agencies in Watertown. These trips ended in 2015.

== Statistics ==
Top domestic destinations from ATY (July 2024 – June 2025)
Rank	Airport	Passengers	Airline
1	Denver, CO	7,810	Denver Air Connection
2	Chicago–O'Hare, IL	5,100	Denver Air Connection

Passenger boardings (enplanements) by year, as per the FAA
Year	2005	2006	2007	2008	2009	2010	2011	2012	2013
Enplanements	9,161	6,212	5,158	4,975	5,824	7,814	8,984	6,254	4,348
Change	+4.79%	-32.19%	-16.97%	-3.55%	+17.07%	+34.17%	+14.97%	-30.39%	-30.48%

== See also ==
- List of airports in South Dakota
- South Dakota World War II Army Airfields

== Other sources ==
- This article incorporates public domain material from the Air Force Historical Research Agency
- Essential Air Service documents (Docket OST-2001-10644) from the U.S. Department of Transportation:
  - Order 2003-7-4 (July 8, 2003): selects Mesaba Aviation, Inc. d/b/a Northwest Airlink, an affiliate of Northwest Airlines, to provide subsidized essential air service (EAS) for a two-year period at Watertown, South Dakota, at an annual rate of $1,871,825.
  - Order 2005-9-9 (September 14, 2005): re-selecting Mesaba Aviation, Inc. d/b/a Northwest Airlink, to provide subsidized essential air service (EAS) for the two-year period beginning August 1, 2005, at Watertown, South Dakota, at an annual rate of $1,211,589.
  - Order 2007-8-19 (August 20, 2007): re-selecting Mesaba Aviation, Inc., d/b/a Northwest Airlink, to continue to provide subsidized essential air service (EAS) at Watertown, South Dakota, for the two-year period beginning August 1, 2007. Service will consist of 14 nonstop round trips per week at an annual subsidy rate of $1,189,606, with flights originating and terminating at Pierre and operated with 34-seat Saab 340 aircraft as Northwest Airlink.
  - Order 2009-7-15 (July 16, 2009): re-selecting Mesaba Aviation, Inc. d/b/a Delta Connection, to continue providing subsidized essential air service (EAS) at Watertown, SD, for the two-year period beginning August 1, 2009, at the annual subsidy rate of $1,338,321.
  - Order 2011-6-6 (June 7, 2011): re-selecting Mesaba Aviation, Inc., operating as Delta Connection, to provide essential air service (EAS) at Watertown, South Dakota. Mesaba will provide two daily nonstop round trips (14 a week) to Minneapolis/St. Paul International Airport (Minneapolis) using 34-seat Saab 340 aircraft for a short-term contract period beginning August 1, 2011, through October 31, 2011, for an annual subsidy of $1,769,019, pro-rated at $450,736 for the contract period.
  - Order 2011-9-5 (September 13, 2011): prohibiting suspension of service and requesting proposals.
  - Order 2011-11-30 (November 23, 2011): selecting Great Lakes Aviation, Ltd., to provide essential air service (EAS) at six communities at the following annual subsidy rates: Brainerd, Minnesota, $959,865; Fort Dodge, $1,798,693; Iron Mountain, $1,707,841; Mason City, $1,174,468; Thief River Falls, Minnesota, $1,881,815; and Watertown, $1,710,324, for the two-year period beginning when Great Lakes inaugurates full EAS at all six communities
  - Order 2014-4-17 (April 18, 2014): reselecting Great Lakes to provide EAS at Watertown, South Dakota using 19 (reconfigured to 9) passenger Beech 1900D aircraft with non-stop service to Minneapolis for 2 round trips each weekday and weekend and one-stop service to Denver for one daily round trip, for a total of 19 per week, for the two-year term from June 1, 2014, through May 31, 2016, for an annual subsidy of $2,847,284.
