= Great Lakes Airlines =

Airline in the United States

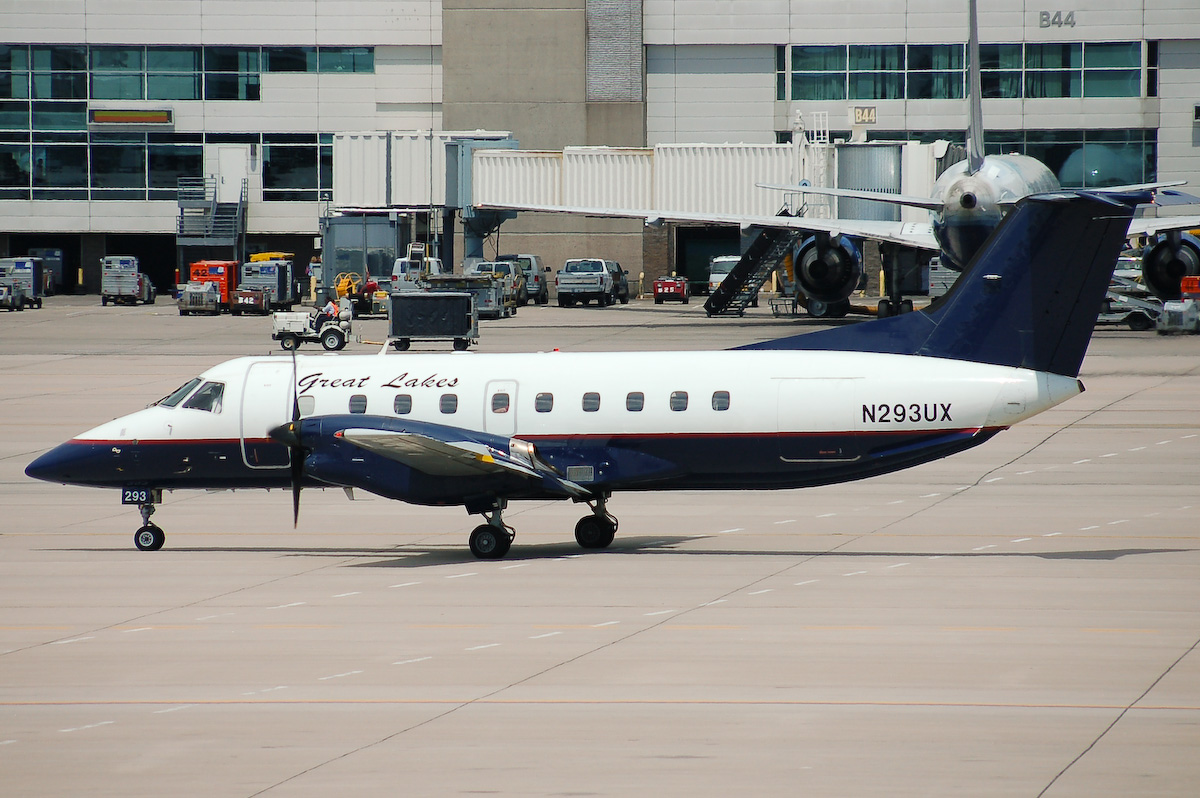
IATA	ICAO	Call sign
ZK	GLA	LAKES AIR
- Founded: 1977; 49 years ago
- Ceased operations: March 26, 2018; 8 years ago
- AOC #: GLBA031A
- Hubs: Denver; Los Angeles; Phoenix–Sky Harbor
- Fleet size: 28
- Destinations: 10
- Parent company: Great Lakes Aviation, Ltd.
- Traded as: Expert Market: GLUX
- Headquarters: Cheyenne, Wyoming, United States
- Founders: Doug Voss; Ivan Simpson

The former logo of the company

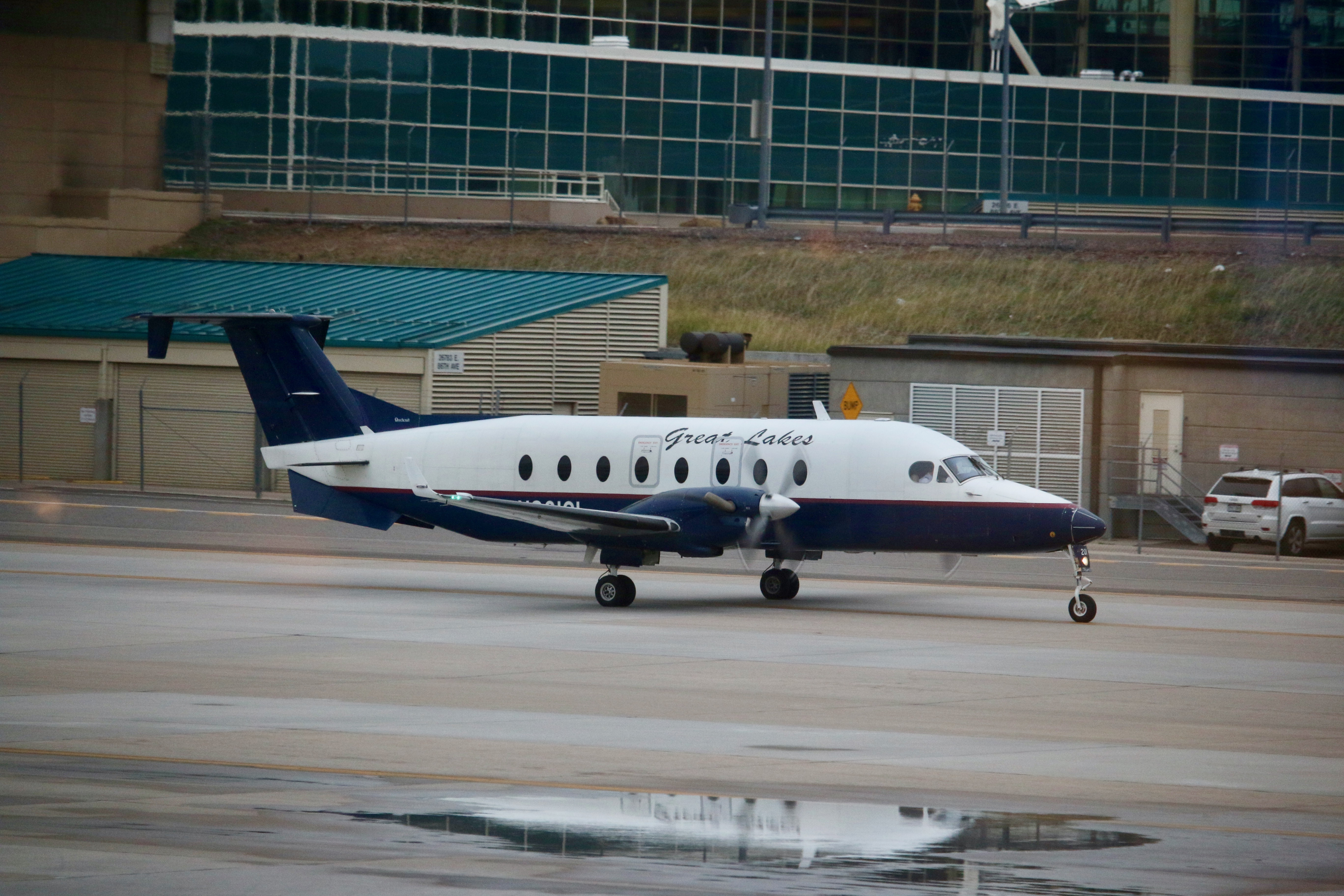
A Great Lakes Beechcraft 1900D taxiing at Denver International Airport

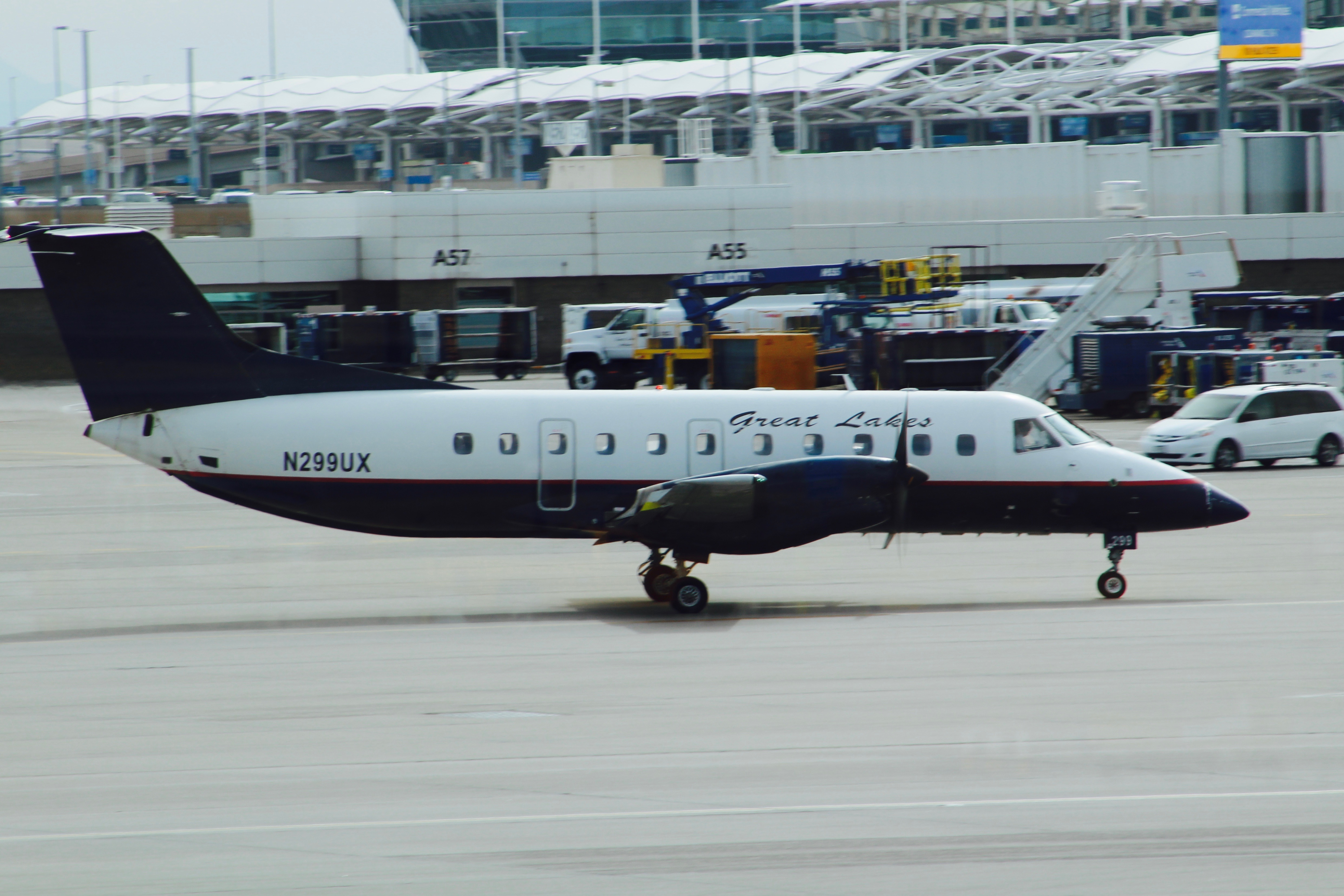
A Great Lakes EMB 120 at Denver International Airport

Great Lakes Airlines was an American regional airline operating domestic scheduled and charter services. Corporate headquarters were in Cheyenne, Wyoming, with a hub at Denver International Airport.

As of November 2013, Great Lakes Airlines received $58,299,575 in annual federal subsidies for Essential Air Services that they provided to rural airports in the U.S.

Great Lakes Airlines was a large United Express feeder carrier from 1992 to 2002 operating to over 100 cities.

On March 26, 2018, the airline stopped scheduled passenger flights, but continued to support Aerodynamics Inc. flights through September 1, 2018.

== History ==
The airline was established by Doug Voss and Ivan Simpson and started operations on April 5, 1977 as Spirit Lake Airways. It was reorganised and began scheduled services on October 12, 1981, as Great Lakes Airlines with flights between Spencer and Des Moines, Iowa. In February 1988, Great Lakes acquired Alliance Airlines.

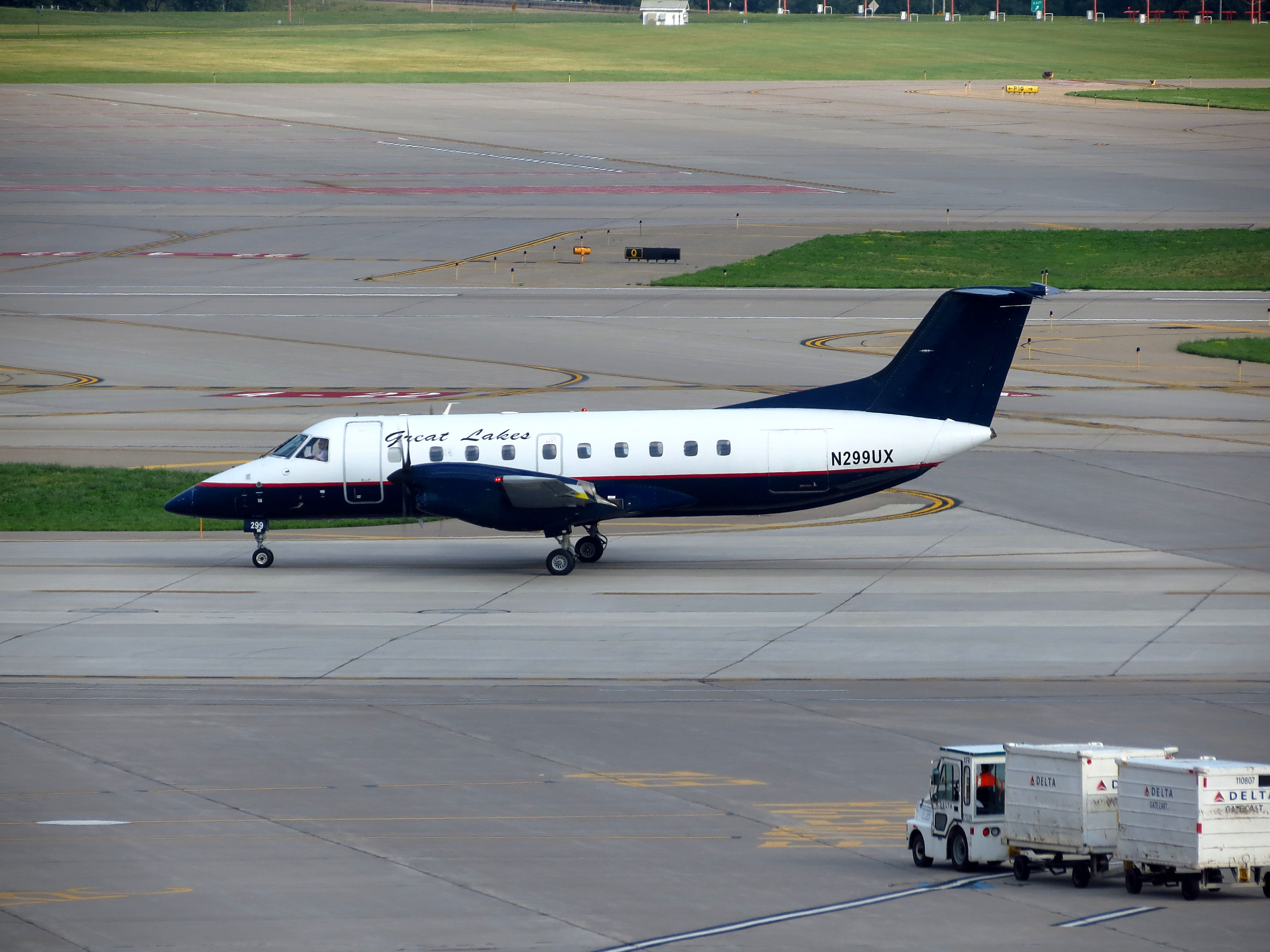
Great Lakes EMB-120 at Minneapolis-St. Paul International Airport

In February 1992 Great Lakes signed a codeshare agreement with United Airlines becoming a United Express feeder carrier. From 1992 through 2002 Great Lakes operated extensive United Express operations with hubs at Chicago O'Hare and Denver and also at Minneapolis where United Airlines did not have a hub operation. Other United Express operations were also flown between Phoenix and Page, Arizona; Detroit to Alpena and Sault Ste. Marie, Michigan; and a shuttle operation between Springfield, Illinois and Chicago's Meigs Field. All flights were operated with 19-seat Beechcraft 1900D and 30-seat Embraer 120 Brasilia aircraft. On June 1, 1998 the airline greatly expanded its Denver hub by adding the United Express routes formerly operated by Mesa Airlines.

Prior to the relocation of the headquarters to Cheyenne, Great Lakes was headquartered in Summit Township, Clay County, Iowa, by Spencer Municipal Airport and near the city of Spencer.

By early 1995, Great Lakes acquired Northern Star Airlines dba Midway Connection on behalf of Midway Airlines (1993-2003). Many routes from Chicago Midway International Airport were obtained that Great Lakes switched to operate from Chicago O'hare International Airport under the United Express banner. Northern Star/Midway Connection had previously obtained the assets of commuter airline Direct Air in mid-1993.

In late 1995, Great Lakes acquired the assets of Arizona Airways obtaining routes from a hub at Tucson International Airport to Phoenix and Page, Arizona, as well as to Albuquerque, NM, and to several points in northern Mexico. Service was also added from Phoenix to Show Low, Arizona. This operation ended on May 16, 1997.

Great Lakes' status as United Express was downgraded in early 2002 when it became an independent carrier but still maintained an indirect codeshare agreement with United Airlines as well as establishing a new code share with Frontier Airlines. Since then Great Lakes saw a steady decline in traffic and service to many cities was dropped including the entire hub operation at Chicago O'Hare. The Minneapolis hub was also closed however a small operation there was reinstated on March 17, 2012 when Essential Air Service (EAS) routes formerly flown by Northwest Airlink carriers were obtained. The Minneapolis hub closed again by 2016. The Denver hub then became the main focus for Great Lakes however routes from that hub were vanishing as well. Many cities the carrier once served as United Express no longer have any airline service.

New flights from Albuquerque to Clovis and Silver City, NM were added on April 3, 2005 after obtaining the EAS contracts for these cities formerly held by Mesa Airlines. These flights operated until November 30, 2012. EAS subsidized flights also operated from small hubs at Phoenix, Los Angeles, Milwaukee, Kansas City, St. Louis, and Billings during 2002 through 2018.

A hub operation at Ontario International Airport was established on April 7, 2009, with routes to Merced and Visalia, California; and to Kingman and Prescott, Arizona; both continuing onto Farmington, New Mexico. The operation was switched from Ontario to Los Angeles, California on May 15, 2011. The airline added service to a new hub serving Las Vegas, Nevada, on April 7, 2010, with routes to Ely, Nevada; Page, Arizona; Farmington, NM; and Merced and Visalia, California. The Las Vegas hub was closed in April 2013. During the years of the hub operations at Phoenix, Las Vegas, Los Angeles, and Ontario, Great Lakes would operate flights by way of Farmington to connect these hubs with the main hub in Denver. A maintenance base was also established at Farmington.

In 2013, a new government ruling requiring first officers to have a minimum of 1500 flight hours and restrictions on crew rest and duty times created a severe hardship for Great Lakes as well as many other commuter airlines. The airline was then forced to pull ten seats out of most of its 19-seat Beech 1900D aircraft. Many flights had to be cancelled as well as all service to several cities including Mason City Municipal Airport. On April 1, 2015, service to Sheridan, Wyoming was dropped leaving the remote city with no air service. Sheridan had been served since the early days of aviation by many airlines, some with jets including Boeing 737s by Western Airlines. Most routes Great Lakes has served are subsidized through Essential Air Service. Through its history the airline is known to have served at least 162 cities and 164 airports (three at Chicago) but was down to only seven cities as of March 22, 2018.

Great Lakes had a rather unusual theme where many of their Beech 1900D aircraft had their tails painted advertising cities that they flew to as well as National Parks in their territory. Some of the tails advertised the cities of Laramie, Wyoming; Alamosa and Telluride, Colorado; Scottsbluff, Nebraska; Ponca City, Oklahoma; Garden City, Kansas, Dodge City, Kansas and Liberal, Kansas; Sierra Vista, Arizona; Pierre, South Dakota; Miles City, Montana, as well as the White Mountains of Arizona, the Teton Range and Devils Tower in Wyoming.

On June 2, 2016, Great Lakes Airlines, Silver Airways and Frontier Airlines announced a partnership for recruiting pilots.

On March 26, 2018, Great Lakes Airlines announced that operations would be suspended effective at midnight. Despite ceasing operations, the company didn't file for bankruptcy and certain segments of the company continued to operate. Flights to Pierre, South Dakota and Watertown, South Dakota continued to operate through Great Lakes Jet Express.

== Destinations ==
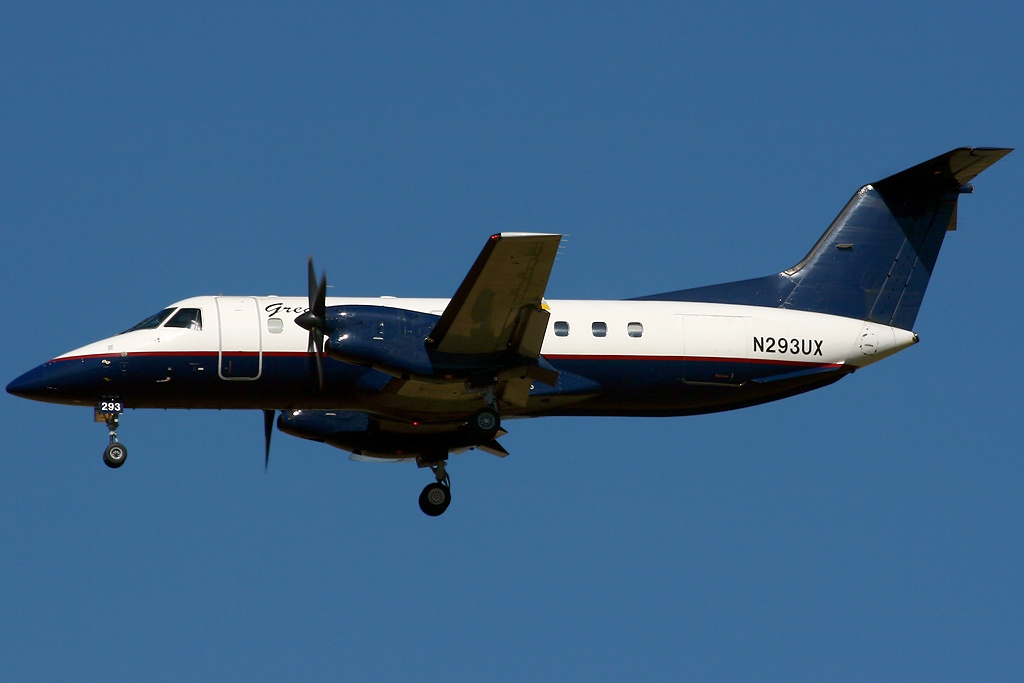
Great Lakes Embraer EMB-120

Great Lakes Airlines was the largest Essential Air Service provider in the United States for many years but served only two of its seven destinations through the Essential Air Service program prior to ceasing operations.

=== Great Lakes Jet Express ===
In 2016, Great Lakes entered into a codeshare agreement named Great Lakes Jet Express where they would sell tickets: for Elite Airways to and from Denver and Houston to Branson Airport; for Aerodynamics Inc. on a route from Chicago O'Hare to Youngstown, and later an EAS route from Denver to Pierre with onward continuing service to Watertown, South Dakota. This controversial practice allows the codesharing carriers to take advantage of Great Lakes' existing distribution and interline agreements with global distribution systems and other airlines. The Chicago to Youngstown route was cancelled less than two months after it began because United Airlines refused to honor its interline agreement with Great Lakes in Chicago, stating that only connections in Denver were covered under the agreement. The service on Elite Airways from Denver and Houston to Branson, Missouri was also cancelled shortly after it began.

== Fleet ==
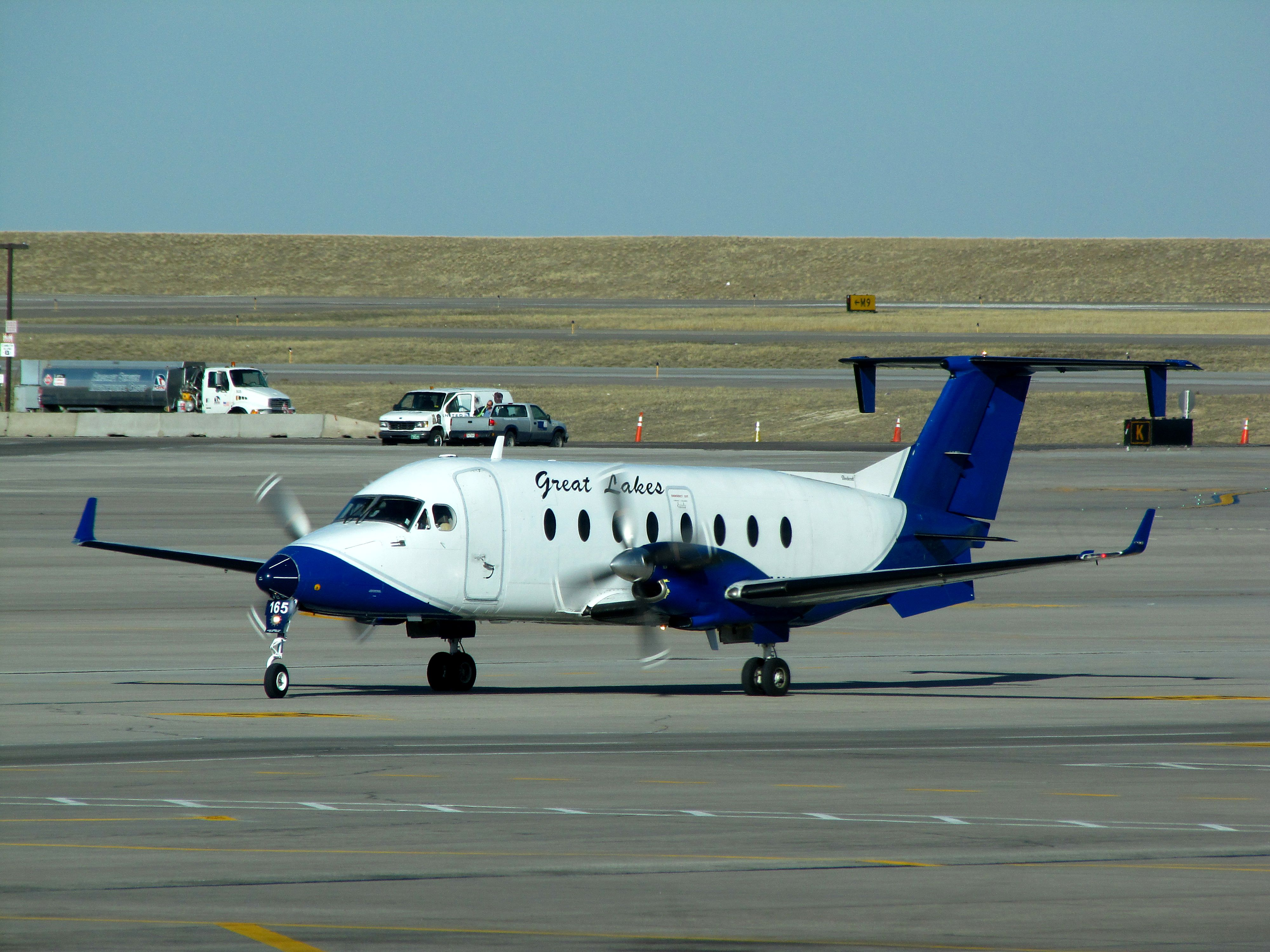
A Beech 1900D at Denver International Airport

During the 1980s Great Lakes operated Beechcraft C99 and Beechcraft 1900C commuter turboprop aircraft. The carrier operated two types of turboprop aircraft, being the Beechcraft 1900D and the Embraer EMB 120 Brasilia. Great Lakes was at one time the world's largest operator of the Beechcraft 1900.

As of September 2017, the Great Lakes Airlines fleet included the following aircraft:

Great Lakes Airlines fleet
Aircraft	Total	Passengers
Embraer EMB 120 Brasilia	6 (as of August 2016)	30
Beechcraft 1900D	24	19 or 9

== Accidents and incidents ==
- On November 19, 1996, United Express Flight 5925 operated by Great Lakes Airlines, a Beechcraft 1900, collided with a King Air during landing at Quincy Regional Airport. The ten passengers and two crew members on board were killed. The pilots of the King Air were blamed for failing to effectively monitor both the common frequency and to scan for traffic.
- On August 19, 1998, United Express Flight 1605 operated by Great Lakes Airlines, a Beechcraft 1900, was substantially damaged. Shortly after the airplane took off, the crew heard a loud noise and felt a slight vibration from the left propeller. They returned and landed. It was discovered that the propeller erosion shield had debonded and a portion had penetrated the passenger cabin just aft of the airstair door, knocked ajar Seat 1A Passenger Service Unit, ricocheted off the ceiling, and penetrated the inner window pane at Seat 2C. One passenger was injured.

== See also ==
- List of defunct airlines of the United States
