= California Department of Consumer Affairs =

Government agency in California

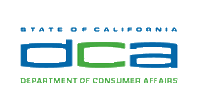

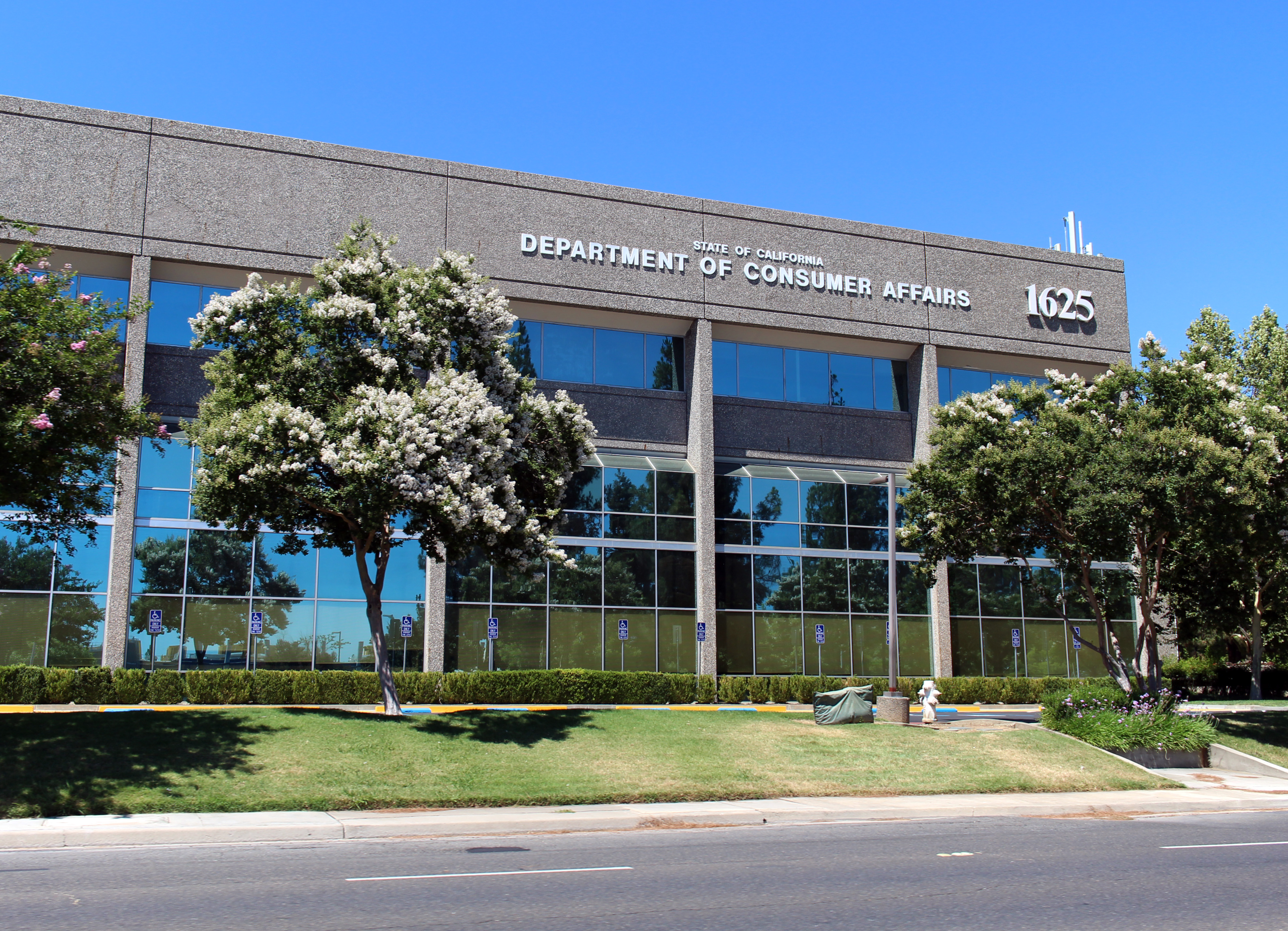
- Headquarters in Sacramento

Department overview
- Jurisdiction: California
- Headquarters: 1625 North Market Blvd., Sacramento, CA 95834; 38°38′50.56″N 121°29′58.42″W
- Employees: 1521 (2010)
- Annual budget: $274 million (2010–2011)
- Department executive: Kimberly Kirchmeyer, Director
- Parent department: Business, Consumer Services and Housing Agency
- Website: dca.ca.gov

The California Department of Consumer Affairs (DCA) is a department within the California Business, Consumer Services, and Housing Agency. DCA's stated mission is to serve the interests of California's consumers by ensuring a standard of professionalism in key industries and promoting informed consumer practices. DCA provides the public with information on safe consumer practices, in an effort to protect the public from unscrupulous or unqualified people who promote deceptive products or services.

There are currently over 3.4 million practitioners licensed by DCA, holding over 280 different license types. The department consists of 36 bureaus, boards, committees, commission, and other entities that license and regulate practitioners. Regulatory duties include investigating complaints against licensees and disciplining violators. Boards, committees, and commissions operate independently but rely on DCA for administrative support. Fees paid by these licensees fund DCA operations almost exclusively. Bureaus, programs, divisions, and offices are under the full control of DCA.

== List of bureaus, boards, and commissions ==
- California Board of Chiropractic Examiners
- California Board of Accountancy
- California Board of Acupuncture
- California Architects Board
- California Board for Professional Engineers, Land Surveyors, and Geologists
- California Board of Barbering and Cosmetology
- California Board of Behavioral Sciences
- California Bureau of Electronic and Appliance Repair, Home Furnishings and Thermal Insulation
- California Board of Guide Dogs for the Blind
- California Board of Optometry
- California Board of Psychology
- California Board of Pharmacy
- California Board of Vocational Nursing and Psychiatric Technicians
- California Bureau of Automotive Repair
- California Bureau of Marijuana Control, formerly the Bureau of Medical Marijuana Regulation
- California Bureau of Naturopathic Medicine
- California Bureau for Private Postsecondary Education
- California Bureau of Real Estate (now an independent department)
- California Bureau of Real Estate Appraisers
- California Bureau of Security and Investigative Services
- California Cemetery and Funeral Bureau
- California Complaint Resolution Program
- California Contractors State License Board
- California Court Reporters Board
- California Dental Board
- California Dental Hygiene Committee
- California Hearing Aid Dispensers Bureau
- California Landscape Architects Technical Committee
- California State Athletic Commission
- California Veterinary Medical Board
- Medical Board of California
- Osteopathic Medical Board of California

== Consumer support ==
DCA provides the public with live telephone assistance in more than 170 languages for consumer-related questions and concerns. The department publishes a number of publications on consumer-related issues, the most popular being the California Tenants Guide. Publications are free to the public and are made available on the department's website.

DCA's enforcement staff works with the Office of the Attorney General of California and local district attorneys to investigate fraudulent activity in the marketplace. Many investigations are initiated as a result of complaints from consumers.

DCA has a Complaint Resolution Program to help resolve disputes between consumers and businesses.

== History ==
Consumer protection in California began with the passage of the Medical Practice Act of 1876. The Act was designed to regulate the State's medical professionals, who up to that point had operated virtually unchecked.

On April 3, 1876, the California State Legislature approved a new law to take effect immediately, which directed each medical society already in existence as of March 10, 1876 to annually appoint a Board of Examiners consisting of seven members. In 1878, such boards were constrained to three designated medical societies and no others, then in 1901 they were replaced by a single Board of Medical Examiners whose nine members would be elected annually by specific medical societies. In 1907, this board was increased to eleven members and the term of office was extended to two years, and a 1911 amendment specified that members would be elected from certain schools or systems of medicine instead of medical societies.

Meanwhile, as explained below, the Legislature had gradually settled into the pattern of authorizing the Governor to appoint members of many other types of professional regulatory boards, rather than allow professionals to elect their own regulators. A 1913 act restructured the medical board to follow this pattern. The existing board was abolished and replaced with a new Board of Medical Examiners, with ten members to be appointed by the Governor to four-year terms.

Over the five decades after its first attempt to regulate medicine in 1876, the Legislature enacted laws to create separate boards to regulate dentists (1885), pharmacists (1891), barbers (1901-1903 and again in 1927), cosmetologists (1927), funeral directors and embalmers (1915), optometrists (1903), veterinarians (1893), accountants (1901), architects (1901), surveyors (1893), and civil engineers (1929, which absorbed the powers of the earlier board for surveyors).

On May 14, 1929, the Legislature enacted a law which created the Department of Vocational and Professional Standards when it went into effect on August 14, 1929. The new department was to "coordinate the administrative and financial affairs" of all the foregoing boards, but the Legislature declined "to set up entirely new administrative machinery" (in the sense of abolishing all the existing boards and creating a new board with plenary authority over the professions). Instead, each board "continued to exist as a separate unit" under the supervision of the new department.

In 1931, the Legislature began to regulate construction contractors by creating a registrar with the power to issue contractor licenses. In 1935, the contractors got their own regulatory board, which was placed under the jurisdiction of the existing department.

The Consumer Affairs Act was passed in 1970, giving the department its current name.

== Administration ==
DCA's boards, bureaus, and other entities are supported by a dedicated and highly skilled staff of legal, technical, and administrative professionals. These professionals provide a wide range of support services including human resources, information technology, investigations, professional examinations, training, strategic planning, budgeting, and more.

The Office of Administrative Services provides accounting, business, personnel, and budget services. It consists of Business Services, Human Resources, and Fiscal Operations. Business Services ensures that DCA entities promote sound business decisions and practices in contracting and purchasing goods and services. It also manages DCA's many facilities, vehicle fleet, emergency response, and its mailroom, copying, and imaging services. Human Resources provides human resources support for DCA employees. Fiscal Operations provides budget, accounting, and central cashiering services.

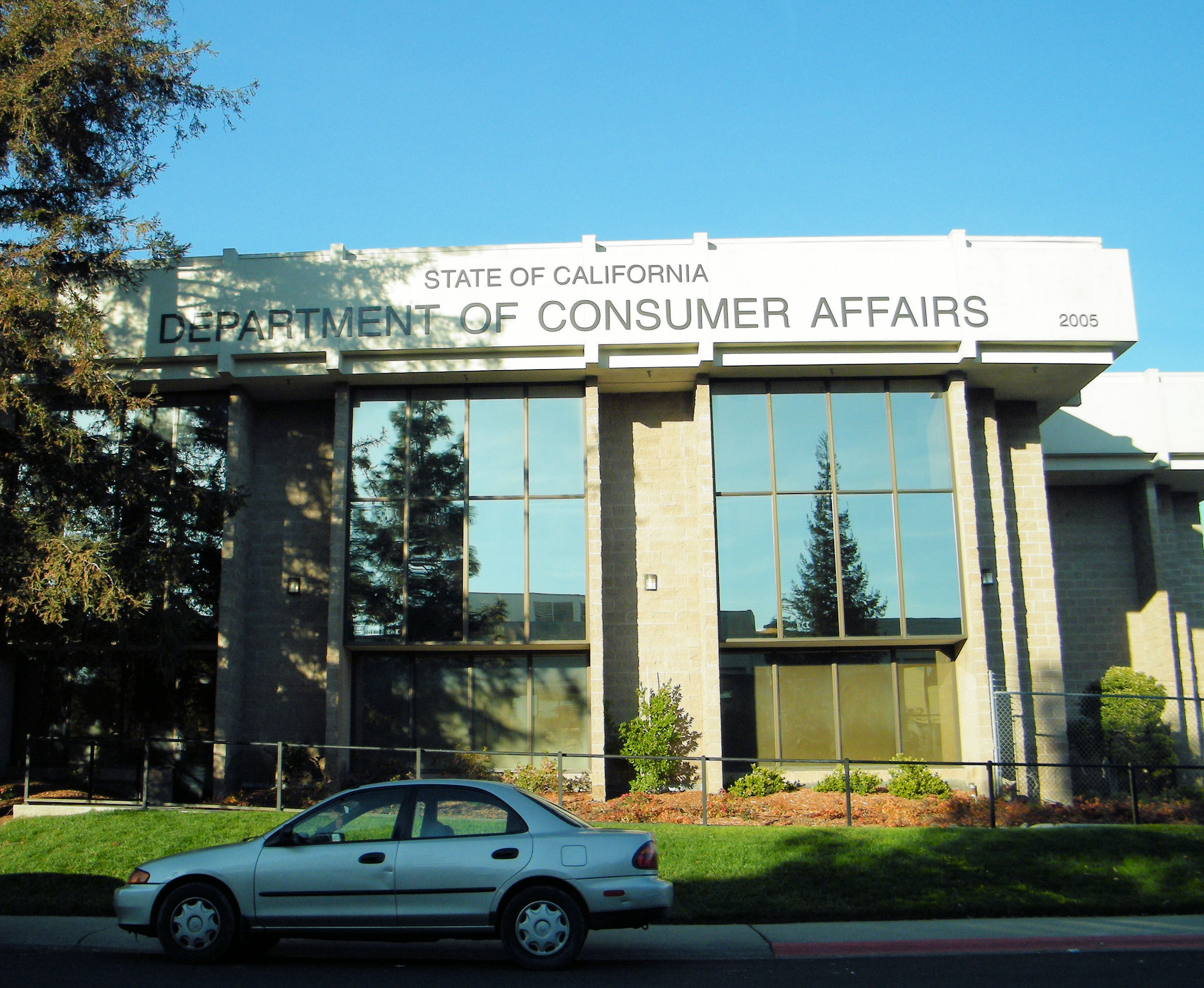
DCA office building in Sacramento housing many subordinate entities, including the state medical and dental boards

The Office of Information Services directs and manages information technology for all of DCA. It consists of Applications Services, Enterprise Technology Services, Infrastructure Services, Client Services, Enterprise Project Services, and the Information Security Office. Application Services maintains the Consumer Affairs System and the Applicant Tracking System databases that form the core of DCA's business processes. Enterprise Technology maintains and supports DCA's UNIX/Wide Area Network as well as the Internet and intranet sites, and maintains the enterprise architecture. Infrastructure Services maintains the desktop and network services, and phone services. Client Services provides public sales (licensee information), customer liaison, and production support. It includes the Family Support Unit, which maintains systems that involve processing limited license hold issues related to child support systems, and the Service Desk. Enterprise Project Services provides project management assistance, control agency liaison services, oversees the OIS change management and release process, manages the BreEZe project that will replace the DCA legacy systems, and is implementing IT Governance. The Information Security Office establishes the IT security and data privacy policies, maintains the business continuity planning process, investigates IT security breaches, and acts as liaison to the State Information Technology Agency in matters related to the IT security of DCA.

The Complaint Resolution Program helps resolve complaints that consumers have filed after experiencing difficulty or disappointment in the California marketplace.

The Consumer information Center is DCA's information resource center for consumers and licensees. Through its Call Center and Correspondence Unit, CIC provides consumers and licensees with user-friendly information and identifies for them the government agency or community organization that can best address their needs. CIC phone agents answer calls from consumers to DCA's toll-free number. Correspondence Unit staff respond to e-mails and letters sent to the department.

The Equal Employment Opportunity Office promotes equal employment opportunity at DCA. The EEO Office also promotes affirmative action for people with disabilities and works to prevent and eliminate discriminatory practices through policy implementation, training, education, and outreach.

The Division of Investigation is the law enforcement and investigative branch of DCA. It is the only entity within DCA that employs investigators who are designated peace officers, per California Penal Code 830.3 (a). DOI staff work to provide timely, objective, and cost-effective investigations regarding allegations of misconduct by licensees of client agencies, and to developing information for filing criminal, administrative, and civil actions on behalf of these agencies. DOI field investigations frequently involve allegations of the illegal use and theft of drugs, sexual misconduct, quality-of-care issues, and unlicensed activity. Within the DOI is the Special Operations Unit which is responsible for workplace security and employee safety at DCA.

The Legal Division includes the Legal Office, the Legal Services Unit, and the Administrative Unit. These units provide legal services to the Department's Executive staff and to all DCA entities. The Legal Office serves as in-house counsel for the director as well as the boards, bureaus, programs, and other entities of DCA. Legal Office lawyers provide legal analysis and opinions on laws, issues, proposed legislation, government contracts, employer-employee matters, the Open Meetings Act, the Public Records Act, and the Information Practices Act. The Legal Services Unit counsels the director in carrying out the consumer mandates of the Consumer Affairs Act. This unit created and maintains several consumer handbooks and guides, including California Tenants: A Guide to Residential Tenants’ and Landlords’ Rights and Responsibilities; The Small Claims Court: A Guide to Its Practical Use; and more than 30 consumer-oriented legal guides. The Administrative Unit provides in-house counsel to the department's administrative divisions and Division of Investigation and represents DCA before the State Personnel Board and the Department of Personnel Administration.

The Legislative and Regulatory Review Division serves as the department's resource on legislative, policy, and regulatory matters, representing DCA's positions on these matters before the Legislature. The Division monitors and analyzes legislative bills on consumer issues, reviews proposed regulation packages, and provides substantive policy consultation and review on myriad issues throughout DCA and its entities. Division staff also advise the director on public policy affecting consumers, as well as on any proposed regulations that impact the health, safety, and welfare of Californians. Division staff attend all board and bureau meetings to identify, analyze, and monitor policy issues, as well as other matters of interest.

The Office of Professional Examination Services provides psychometric consulting services for the management of occupational licensure examination programs. OPES’ services include occupational analysis, item writing, examination development, standard setting, program evaluation, and statistical analysis of examination performance. OPES follows the highest technical and professional standards in the industry to ensure that licensing examinations are valid, job-related, and legally defensible. In addition to servicing 30—40 interagency contracts with DCA boards, bureaus, and committees, OPES also oversees the master contract for examination administration at computer-based testing centers throughout the State. In June 2013, OPES implemented a new master contract with PSI Services LLC, resulting in cost savings of 10 percent for its clients that use the contract.

The Office of Public Affairs creates and executes strategic media and communications plans for DCA, proactively provides news media with information of interest to consumers, and responds to media inquiries. OPA alerts media to unlicensed activity sweeps.

The Office of Publications, Design & Editing designs, edits, updates, and distributes more than 200 consumer publications, newsletters, and reports produced by DCA's various entities and by its Executive Office. PDE supports DCA's licensees by producing and publishing online newsletters for many of its boards and bureaus, and supports DCA staff by producing Did You Know?, the monthly online newsletter for employees. PDE staff also write, edit, design, and distribute DCA's quarterly consumer magazine, Consumer Connection.

Solid Training Solutions supports the development of all DCA employees through the design, delivery, evaluation, and administration of training and education programs.
