= California Postsecondary Education Commission =

Defunct government organization in California

Agency overview
- Formed: 1974
- Dissolved: June 30, 2011
- Jurisdiction: Government of California
- Website: cpec.ca.gov (archived)

The California Postsecondary Education Commission (CPEC) was the higher education planning and coordinating agency from 1974 to 2011 under the government of California.

== History ==
The 1960 California Master Plan for Higher Education recognized that critical to the success of California's tripartite system of public higher education was a central body responsible for coordination and planning for higher education. The California Postsecondary Education Commission was established in 1974 as the State planning and coordinating body for higher education.

The Commission serves a unique role in integrating policy, fiscal, and programmatic analyses about California's entire system of postsecondary education; "to assure the effective utilization of public postsecondary education resources, thereby eliminating waste and unnecessary duplication, and to promote diversity, innovation, and responsiveness to student and societal needs through planning and coordination."

=== Closure ===
The California Postsecondary Education Commission's entire General Fund allocation ($1,927,000) for 2011–2012 was eliminated by governor Jerry Brown in a line item veto upon signing the State Budget on June 30, 2011.

== Composition ==
The Commission consisted of 16 members, nine of whom represent the general public, five who represent the major systems of California education (the California Community Colleges, the California State University, the University of California, the independent colleges and universities, and the State Board of Education), and two student representatives.

The Commission appointed its executive director who coordinates the agency's staff to carry out the day-to-day work of the Commission. Its external affairs staff interacted on a daily basis with legislators and their staff, administrative offices, governmental officials, and media representatives. Its research staff prepares analyses, briefs, and numerous reports approved and published by the Commission. They also engaged in various continuing activities such as reviewing proposed academic programs, new campuses or centers, conducting data analysis of student flow, and responding to requests of the Legislature and Governor.

== Purpose ==
While there are many tasks and responsibilities which the Commission and its staff fulfill, the primary statutory purposes of the California Postsecondary Education Commission are:

- Develop an ongoing statewide plan for the operation of an educationally and economically sound, vigorous, innovative and coordinated system of postsecondary education;
- Identify and recommend policies to meet the educational, research and public service needs of the State of California; and
- Advise the Governor and Legislature on policy and budget priorities that best preserve broad access to high quality postsecondary education opportunities.

In carrying out its responsibilities, the Commission reflects a deep commitment to serving the State as a whole, consistent with the underlying philosophy of California's Master Plan for Higher Education. The Commission is committed to an educational environment that exemplifies equality and educational opportunity, as well as a focus on student and institutional achievement and accountability.

== Responsibilities ==
Among the duties and responsibilities of the Commission were the following:

- Provide independent, comprehensive, and timely information about student enrollment, educational outcomes and other educational policy issues;
- Conduct long-range planning of the needs for new college or university campuses in light of projected enrollment demand;
- Review proposals from public colleges and universities for new degree programs;
- Serve as the State's primary information clearinghouse for postsecondary education;
- Evaluate budget requests of State-supported colleges and universities;
- Develop policy recommendations regarding financial aid programs for California students;
- Seek strategies for greater efficiency and cost containment in postsecondary education;
- Administer federal programs that improve teacher training by facilitating collaboration between K-12 and higher education faculties;
- Recommend to the Legislature and the Governor legislation the Commission deems necessary or appropriate to improve postsecondary education in California;
- Encourage greater cooperation and collaboration between and among California educational systems.

== See also ==
- California Commission on Teacher Credentialing
- California Bureau for Private Postsecondary and Vocational Education
- "Fixing California’s big education data gap," K-12 Daily, May 6, 2019.
