= California Bureau for Private Postsecondary and Vocational Education =

Unit of the California Department of Consumer Affairs

The California Bureau for Private Postsecondary and Vocational Education (BPPVE) was a unit of the California Department of Consumer Affairs whose purpose was to protect students by establishing academic standards for private institutions of higher education in California. BPPVE approval or exemption was required by the State of California to ensure consumer safety from fraudulent or substandard education providers. The agency ceased operation on July 1, 2007, when the legislative authority for its creation expired. A new agency, the California Bureau for Private Postsecondary Education, took its place on January 1, 2010.

The agency was not a recognized accreditor, nor did its approval serve as a substitute for educational accreditation. State Approval did mean that the Bureau had determined and certified that each approved institution had met minimum standards as established in state law for integrity, financial stability, and educational quality.

== Purpose and functions ==
The Private Postsecondary and Vocational Reform Act of 1989 created the Council for Private Postsecondary and Vocational Education as the overseer and regulator of private post-secondary educational institutions in the State of California, transferring this authority from a Division of the state's Department of Education. A 1997 amendment to the legislation replaced the Council with the Bureau for Private Postsecondary and Vocational Education (BPPVE). The bureau "regulated approximately 1,800 schools serving an estimated 400,000 students", and administered statutory exemptions from the regulations for schools that teach religion.

The BPPVE was not a recognized accreditor, nor did its approval serve as a substitute for educational accreditation. State Approval meant that the Bureau had determined and certified that each approved institution had met minimum standards as established in state law for integrity, financial stability, and educational quality. To qualify for approval, an institution had to meet standards with regard to course objectives, and content of courses; physical space; equipment and instructional materials. Other approval criteria included the education, experience and qualifications of instructors and administrators; maintenance of student records; compliance with health and safety codes; and policies for refunding unused tuition and fees. State approval was also a prerequisite in order for a private institution to become accredited. BPPVE informational materials stated "Approval is not the same as accreditation." Institutions already holding regional or national accreditation were not required to seek California state approval.

The bureau accepted and acted on student complaints and oversaw a fund to reimburse tuition money if a school closed unexpectedly. It also maintained a directory of schools with information regarding operation and academics.

The agency acquired a reputation for being ineffectual.

== Cessation of operations ==
Because of a sunset provision in the law, the Private Postsecondary and Vocational Education Reform Act expired on July 1, 2007, and the BPPVE was required to cease operations on that date. Legislation to extend the statute was passed by the State Legislature but was vetoed by Governor Schwarzenegger. In his veto message, the governor called for comprehensive reform, saying that an extension of the statute would "[allow] problems that have been well documented to continue to exist and merely [allow] mediocrity for California’s students." On July 12, 2007, Schwarzenegger signed into law a bill to extend student protections at private postsecondary vocational education institutions through January 31, 2008. This statute allowed the state Department of Consumer Affairs to enter into voluntary compliance agreements with for-profit institutions while more permanent arrangements were considered by the legislature and state administration.

During the period between the termination of BPPVE and the start of operations by the successor organization in January 2010, diploma mill operations increased in California.

== See also ==
- Diploma mill
- List of unaccredited institutions of higher learning
- List of unrecognized accreditation associations of higher learning
- List of recognized accreditation associations of higher learning
- Oregon State Office of Degree Authorization
