= Diploma mills in the United States =

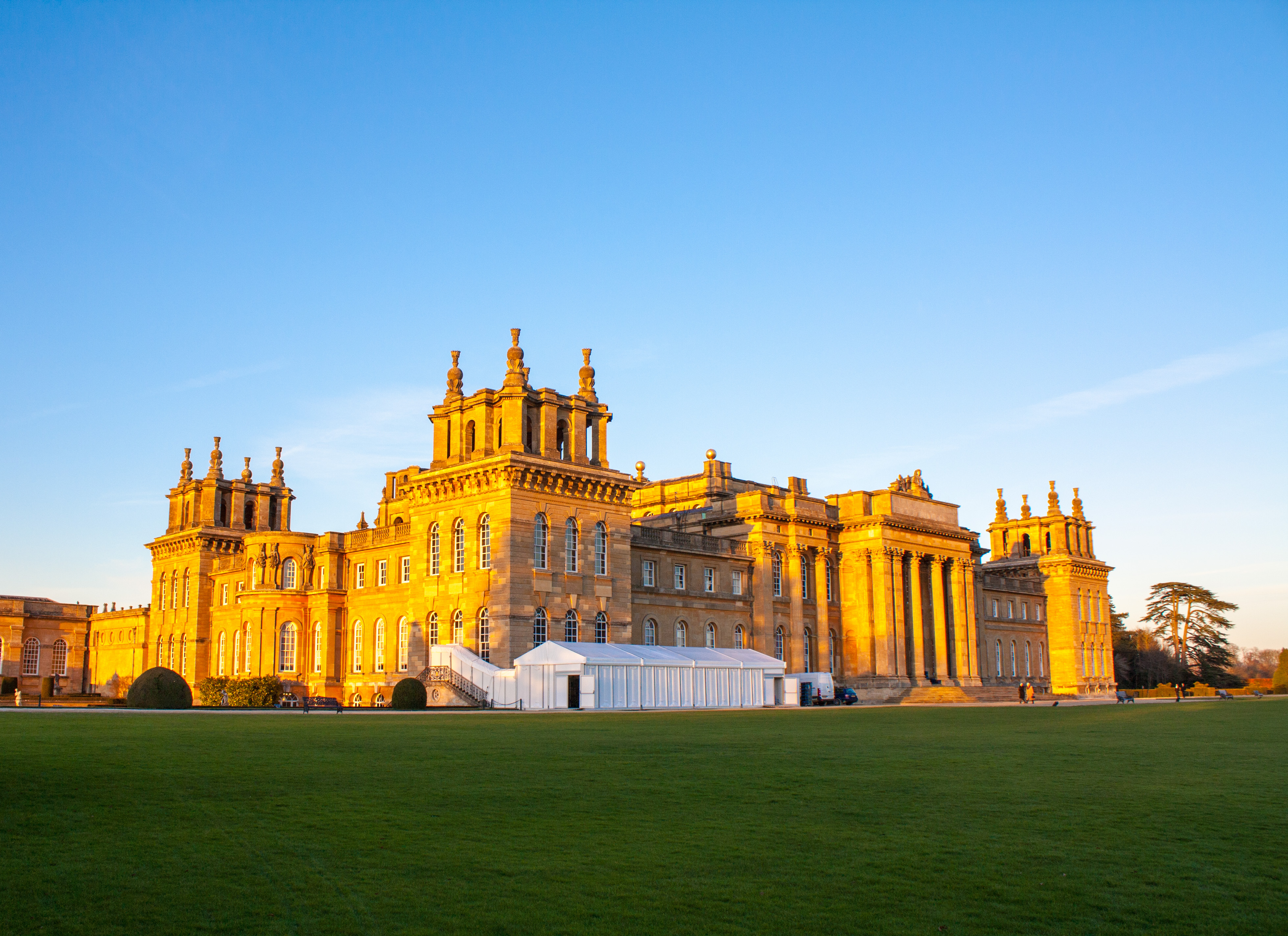
Blenheim Palace, birthplace of Winston Churchill. While not part of a university, its image was featured as part of the campus of the fictional Robertstown University, a diploma mill.

Diploma mills in the United States (also known as a degree mill) are organizations that award academic degrees and diplomas with substandard or no academic study and without academic approval by officially recognized educational accrediting bodies or qualified government agencies. The purchaser can then claim to hold an academic degree, and the organization is motivated by making a profit. These degrees are often awarded based on vaguely construed life experience. Some organizations claim accreditation by non-recognized/unapproved accrediting bodies set up for the purposes of providing a veneer of authenticity.

Various schemes have been implemented to curb the proliferation of diploma mills, and a number of states have passed bills that make it illegal for an organization to confer degrees without accreditation.

In recent years unaccredited for-profit higher education institutions have specialized in enrolling foreign students and have been called sham schools.

== Legal status ==
The United States does not have a federal law that would unambiguously prohibit diploma mills, and the term "university" is not legally protected. The United States Department of Education lacks direct plenary authority to regulate schools and, consequently, the quality of an institution's degree. Under the terms of the Higher Education Act of 1965, as amended, the U.S. Secretary of Education is required by law to publish a list of nationally recognized accrediting agencies that the Secretary determines to be reliable authorities on the quality of education or training provided by the institutions of higher education that they accredit.

Diploma mills are mainly found in the U.S. jurisdictions which have not adopted tough laws to prohibit them. Also, some degree mills have taken advantage of the U.S. Constitution's protection of religion by representing themselves as Bible colleges, since in many jurisdictions religious institutions can legally offer degrees in religious subjects without government regulation. Nevertheless, some religious colleges and seminaries have been fined for issuing degrees without meeting educational requirements.

Although the DipScam operation in the 1980s led to a decline in diploma mill activity across the United States, the lack of further action by law enforcement, uneven state laws, and the rise of the Internet have combined to reverse many of the gains made in previous years.

A 2002 Seattle Times article noted that some believed Wyoming had "become a haven for diploma mills." Conversely, "Oregon, New Jersey, and North Dakota have adopted tough laws that include fines and jail time for using fake degrees to gain employment." However, Wyoming passed stricter laws in 2006 requiring universities and colleges to either be accredited or be candidates for accreditation to operate in the state.

In 2004, a housecat named Colby Nolan was awarded an "Executive MBA" by Texas-based Trinity Southern University. The cat belonged to a deputy attorney general looking into allegations of fraud by the school. The cat's application was originally for a Bachelor of Business Administration, but due to the cat's "qualifications" (including work experience in fast-food and as a paperboy) the school offered to upgrade the degree to an Executive MBA for an additional $100. As a result of this incident, the Pennsylvania attorney general filed suit against the school. The operators were fined over $100,000.

In February 2005, the US Department of Education launched "The Database of Accredited Postsecondary Institutions and Programs" to combat the spread of fraudulent degrees.

The state of Washington passed a bill in March 2006 "prohibiting false or misleading college degrees." The law was approved and introduced penalties of five years in prison and a $10,000 fine for knowingly granting or promoting an unaccredited award. In Tennessee, a law that took effect in July 2004 made diploma mill degrees illegal, but the state does not have an agency or authority to investigate. Florida enacted a state law making it a criminal offense to claim a degree from an unaccredited college, but in 2003 it was reported that Hillsborough County, Florida, authorities had been advised that the statute was unconstitutional. Wyoming passed a law requiring a post-secondary institution granting degrees to Wyoming citizens to be accredited, or to be a candidate for accreditation. (There is an exemption for religious schools.)

The State of Michigan Civil Service publishes a list of unaccredited schools based on the Council for Higher Education Accreditation. Michigan also has a system of publicly chartered colleges and universities (such as the University of Michigan, Wayne State University, Michigan State University, et al.) Private colleges and universities are regulated by the Michigan State Board of Education.

U.S. jurisdictions where the use of higher education credentials from diploma mills and unaccredited schools is explicitly illegal or legally restricted include Illinois, Indiana, Maine, Michigan, Missouri, Nevada, New Jersey, North Dakota, Oregon, South Dakota, Texas, Virginia, and Washington. Many other states are also considering restrictions on unaccredited degree use in order to help prevent fraud. In 2006, Mississippi passed laws to restrict diploma mills and more legislation was planned for 2009 to further restrict institutions operating without approval". According to George Gollin, a University of Illinois professor and board member of the Council for Higher Education Accreditation, California is the only state in the country without rules governing postsecondary education institutions. This is because Governor Schwarzenegger vetoed renewing the Private Postsecondary and Vocational Education Reform Act. The military also restricts the use of unaccredited degrees; a notable case involved Vice Admiral Donald Arthur of the U.S. Navy.

Wyoming-based Kennedy-Western University sued the state of Oregon in 2004, challenging a state law that made it illegal for résumés used in connection with employment (including job applications) in the state to list degrees from institutions that are not accredited or recognized by the state as legitimate., Kennedy-Western claimed that its degree-holders had a First Amendment right to say they were degree-holders. The case never got to trial because the parties reached an out-of-court settlement. Under the settlement, Kennedy-Western degree-holders may say that they have degrees when applying for private sector jobs in Oregon, but must also reveal that the school is unaccredited on all job applications, resumes, business cards and advertisements that mention the degree. (Public employment and licensed professions are excepted from the agreement). A statutory revision was enacted in 2005, allowing graduates of unaccredited and unapproved schools to list an unaccredited degree on a résumé as long as they note the school's unaccredited status in the résumé. In the settlement, the Oregon State Office of Degree Authorization (ODA) also agreed to refrain from referring to the school as a "diploma mill." Oregon now lists Kennedy-Western as "unaccredited", stating that its "degrees do not meet requirements for employment by State of Oregon or for work in any profession licensed by the State of Oregon for which a degree is required". The school eventually changed names and was forced to cease operations on March 31, 2009, after a failed attempt to become accredited.

In 2005 it was reported that the National Collegiate Athletic Association had been "scrutinizing the standards of nontraditional high schools to identify 'diploma mills'." Reportedly this started when The New York Times exposed University High School, a correspondence school in Miami, Florida. There were 22 schools that went under review to make sure they meet NCAA requirements in 2005.

In 2009, it was reported that a housecat named Oreo Collins had been awarded a General Education Diploma from Jefferson High School Online.

In 2010, it was revealed that Kenneth Shong ran "Carlingford University", a diploma mill, while he was incarcerated at Racine Correctional Institute in Racine, Wisconsin for several crimes, including fraud. The operation was run with addresses in London, England; Mobile, Alabama; and in Green Bay, which turned out to be empty store fronts or PO Boxes.

== Government jobs scandals and Senate Committee Hearings ==
In 2004, Laura Callahan resigned from the United States Department of Homeland Security after it was learned that she had received her doctorate from the unaccredited Hamilton University (not to be confused with the fully accredited Hamilton College in Clinton, New York). Callahan had previously been a senior director at the DHS and held supervisory positions at the United States Department of Labor and within the Bill Clinton White House. According to an article in Reason magazine, "The (Callahan) scandal raises serious doubts about the government's ability to vet the qualifications of public employees on whom the nation's security depends."

The Callahan scandal caused a public outcry. In May 2004 the U.S. Senate Committee on Governmental Affairs conducted hearings to determine whether the federal government had paid for, or governmental officials possessed, degrees from unaccredited schools. As part of those hearing the US Government Accountability Office presented the results of an eight-month examination and report released by the Government Accountability Office (GAO). This was the first major inquiry into fraudulent use of and reimbursement for non-qualifying academic degrees by government workers since Operation Dipscam. The Senate Hearings detailed a pattern of widespread and ongoing abuse by numerous federal employees, based on information provided by several unaccredited schools that cooperated with the initial probe. The institutions, California Coast University, Kennedy-Western University, and both Pacific Western University (Hawaii) and Pacific Western University (California), represented a small fraction of the dozens of unaccredited institutions and some suspected diploma mills in existence nationwide. The particular concern addressed was that the regulations allowing Federal funding of degrees mandate that the program must be accredited. California Coast University and Pacific Western University (California) were both California State Approved by the California Bureau for Private Postsecondary and Vocational Education at the time of the hearings. (California Coast has since gained accreditation from the Distance Education and Training Council and Pacific Western University (California) ceased operation in 2007 after its assets were sold to an accredited university.)

463 federal employees were discovered to have been enrolled in the three schools at the time of the inquiry. The Department of Defense had the highest number of enrollees, with 257 employees registered. The GAO also found that the government itself had paid at least $170,000 for questionable "coursework" by federal employees at California Coast and Kennedy-Western alone, and believed that even this amount had been significantly understated by the institutions involved.

The GAO report revealed that at least 28 senior-level employees had obtained their degrees from diploma mills or unaccredited universities, while cautioning that "this number is believed to be an understatement." The implicated officials included three unnamed National Nuclear Security Administration managers with emergency operations responsibility and top "Q level" security clearance allowing access to sensitive nuclear weapons information. In May 2004, NNSA spokesman Brian Wilkes told reporters that "the [managers'] conditions of employment did not rest on the education that they were claiming," and that the revelations would not affect their job status.

Many of the federal officials implicated in the scandal were never publicly named, and their status remains unclear. Charles Abell, the principal Deputy Undersecretary of Defense for Personnel and Readiness, was identified by the press as having obtained his master's degree from Columbus University of New Orleans, an unaccredited distance learning school. Daniel P. Matthews, Chief Information Officer for the Department of Transportation (which oversees the Transportation Security Administration) was reported to have received his $3,500 Bachelor of Science degree from Kent College (not to be confused with Kent State University in Kent, Ohio), a diploma mill in Mandeville, Louisiana. In spite of these revelations, both remained in their positions and continued to hold security clearances. Abell continued in his Defense Department job until August 2005, when he joined the staff of the United States Senate Committee on Armed Services, where he remained until 2007.

In 2004 CBS News discovered other high-ranking government officials who were Kensington University alumni: Rene Drouin, who sat on an advisory committee at the U.S. Department of Education, and Florida State Rep. Jennifer Carroll, who served on the National Commission on Presidential Scholars. Carroll resigned her commissioner position after the CBS investigation raised questions about her degree.

== Terrorism concerns and immigration abuse ==
On December 15, 2005, CNN aired a report on diploma mills and terrorism. The report explained that "H-1B visas can be issued to anyone who is highly skilled and can get a job in the U.S. McDevitt is concerned a phony advanced degree could be the first step for someone in a terrorist sleeper cell."

The report explained, the Secret Service "bought their own degree for a perfect terrorist candidate, although theirs was fictional." The person was Mohammed Syed with no formal education, but training in chemical engineering with the Syrian army. "The Secret Service even added to Syed's application that he needed a degree quickly, so he could find employment and obtain an H-1B visa, allowing him to stay in the US." Furthermore, "In less than a month, the imaginary Syrian army expert was notified, James Monroe University was awarding him three advanced degrees in engineering and chemistry, all for $1,277."

The U.S. Government Accountability Office investigations revealed the relative ease with which a diploma mill can be created and bogus degrees obtained. Records obtained from schools and agencies likely understate the extent to which the federal government has paid for degrees from diploma mills and other unaccredited schools. Many agencies have difficulty in providing reliable data because they do not have systems in place to properly verify academic degrees or to detect fees for degrees that are masked as fees for training courses. Agency data obtained likely do not reflect the true extent to which senior-level federal employees have diploma mill degrees. This is because the agencies do not sufficiently verify the degrees that employees claim to have or the schools that issued the degrees, which is necessary to avoid confusion caused by the similarity between the names of accredited schools and the names assumed by diploma mills. It was found that there are no uniform verification practices throughout the government whereby agencies can obtain information and conduct effective queries on schools and their accreditation status.

In March 2011, The Chronicle of Higher Education published an investigation into the practices of TVU and other American for-profit higher education institutions that are virtually unknown within the United States, lack accreditation, and specialize in enrolling foreign students.

In 2011, Tri-Valley University, an unaccredited school, was raided by the Immigration and Customs Enforcement for operating as a front for illegal immigration. On May 2, 2011, TVU's founder and owner, Susan Su, was arrested on indictments by a Federal Grand Jury on 33 counts.

On July 28, 2011 University of Northern Virginia, an unaccredited school, was raided by the Immigration and Customs Enforcement. Kapil Sibal, a minister in India's current cabinet, compared UNVA to a "sham university," stating UNVA does not have acceptable accreditation. Although media sources in India speculated that UNVA would close permanently in 2011, the university remained open at that time. The university was closed on July 16, 2013, by order of the State Council of Higher Education for Virginia, due to its failure to achieve accreditation.

On August 3, 2012 Herguan University, an unaccredited school, was served with a notice of intent to withdraw its SEVP certification. Herguan's CEO has been indicted on visa fraud charges.

== See also ==
- Accreditation mill
- Degrees offered by unaccredited institutions of higher education
- .edu
- Educational accreditation
- Essay mill
- Job fraud
- List of animals awarded human credentials
- List of unaccredited institutions of higher education
- List of unrecognized higher education accreditation organizations
- Mickey Mouse degrees
- Name It and Frame It?
- Unaccredited institutions of higher learning
- Underwater basket weaving
- Who's Who scam
