= Australia–Saudi Arabia relations =

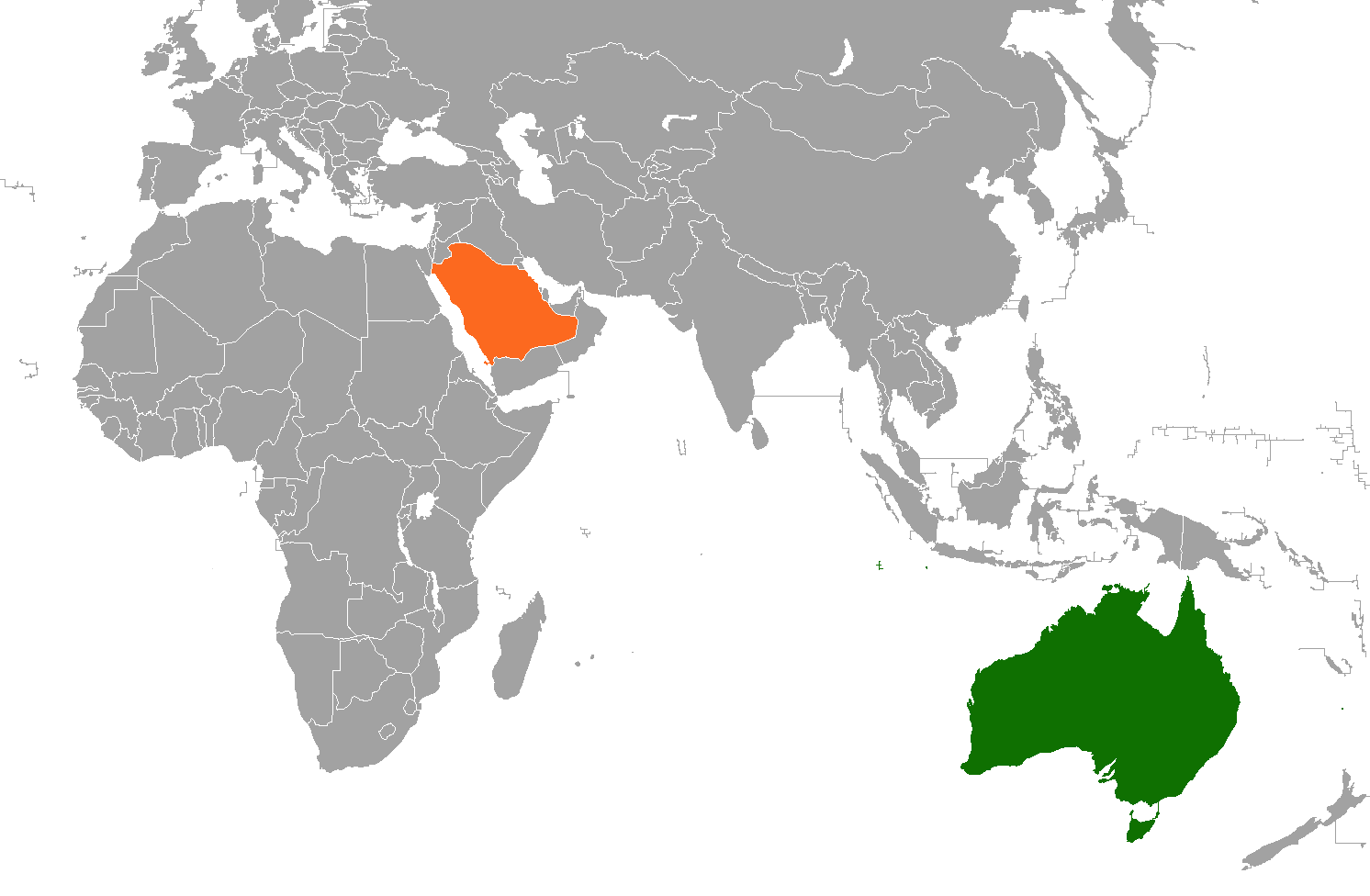

- Australia: Saudi Arabia

Bilateral relations exist between Australia and Saudi Arabia. Australia has an embassy in Riyadh and a consulate in Jeddah; and Saudi Arabia has an embassy in Canberra and a consulate in Sydney. The two countries are members of G20.

== History ==
Australia and Saudi Arabia established relations following the end of World War II. Saudi Arabia and Australia were part of the joint-alliance with the United States during the Cold War, as both were strongly anti-communist and hostile to the Soviet Union.

Australia first appointed a resident ambassador in 1974, with the embassy located in Jeddah along with those of other foreign legations. Saudi Arabia appointed its first resident ambassador in 1982, establishing an embassy in Canberra. The Australian embassy was moved to the Saudi capital Riyadh in 1984 at the request of the Saudi government.

=== 21st century ===
In 2016, it was reported that Saudi embassy staff in Canberra overspeed and do not pay their fines.

In 2018, after Jamal Khashoggi was assassinated, the Australian government condemned the Saudi authorities and stated that Australian diplomats would not be attending an international event later that year.

In 2019, when Saudi Arabia announced Saudi Vision 2030, Australia was viewed highly for its contribution to the vision development.

== Sporting relations ==
=== 2018 World Cup qualifying controversy ===
During the 2018 FIFA World Cup qualification – AFC third round, Australia faced up Saudi Arabia in an important game in Adelaide. The match happened after the deadly Manchester Arena bombing in England, which saw 23 people killed in an Islamic terror attack. The two teams were reportedly informed that a minute's silence would be held before the game, however the Saudi team did not observe the minute's silence. The Saudi officials later apologized for the misdeed and claimed to correct the mistakes.

=== 2023 FIFA Women's World Cup ===
In 2023, it was announced that the Saudi Tourism Authority would be a major sponsor of the 2023 FIFA Women's World Cup hosted by Australia and New Zealand. In response, Football Australia publicly criticised FIFA for its lack of conclusion, following concerns expressed in Australia over human rights violations. The sponsorship was ultimately not proceeded with.

== Economic relations ==
In 2021, the two-way goods and services trade totalled $2.93 billion. Saudi Arabia is a substantial market for Australian beef, sheep meat, barley, wheat, dairy products, cosmetics, pharmaceuticals, vehicle parts and accessories and vegetables.

== Education ==
A large number of Saudi tertiary students study in Australia, mostly under the King Salman Scholarship Program. In 2019, there were more than 6,200 Saudi students studying in Australian educational institutions, representing the largest cohort from the Middle East region.

== Diaspora ==
At the time of the 2016 Australian census, there were over 12,000 Saudi Arabians living in Australia.

Saudi Arabians living in Australia tend to have a higher median income compared to other migrant populations and the average Australian-born population. They are predominantly young (majority being under the age of 30).

== Opinion polls ==
In 2020, Saudi Arabia was the most negatively perceived country by Australians according to a 2020 poll by the Lowy Institute, scoring only a 32% positivity rating.

== Resident diplomatic missions ==
- Australia has an embassy in Riyadh.
- Saudi Arabia has an embassy in Canberra and a consulate-general in Sydney.

== See also ==
- Foreign relations of Australia
- Foreign relations of Saudi Arabia
- Australians in Saudi Arabia
- Saudi Australians
- List of ambassadors of Australia to Saudi Arabia
