= Visa fraud =

Crime involving immigration documents

Visa fraud has different criteria in various parts of the world but the commonly accepted points are the sale, provision, or transfer of otherwise legitimate visas, misrepresentation of reasons for traveling and forgery or alteration of a visa.

== In the United States ==
The United States reports that most cases of visa fraud are related to immigrants lying about their situation to seek refuge in the country, though smuggling and terrorism are also both key factors in the crime.

In the United States, visa fraud can be prosecuted under several statutes, including;

- 18 USC 1546 Fraud and Misuse of Visas, Permits, and Other Documents
- 18 USC 1001 False Statements or Entries Generally
- 18 USC 1028 Fraud in Connection with Identification Documents

It is a federal offense subject to harsh sentencing, though mitigating factors are often taken into account in the case of potential immigrants. The maximum penalties faced by fraudsters are recounted below.

- 10 years for a first offense not tied to terrorism or drug trafficking
- 15 years for fraud with other criminal links
- 20 years for fraud related to drug trafficking
- 25 years for fraud related to international terrorism

== Notable incidents ==
- German visa affair (2005)
- Polish cash-for-visa scandal (2023)
- United States
  - Tri-Valley University – unaccredited private university shut down in 2011 for visa fraud
  - Devyani Khobragade incident (2013)
  - University of Northern New Jersey – 2013 sting operation to investigate student visa fraud
  - University of Farmington – 2015 sting operation to investigate student visa fraud
  - Herguan University – unaccredited private university revoked of SEVP approval in 2016

== See also ==
- Diploma mill
- Human trafficking
- Illegal immigration
- People smuggling
- Sham marriage
- White collar crime
