= University of Northern New Jersey =

Fake university by the US Department of Homeland Security

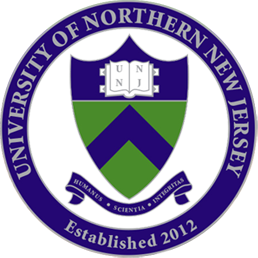
The seal of the fictitious University of Northern New Jersey

The University of Northern New Jersey (UNNJ) was a fake university created and maintained by the United States Department of Homeland Security from 2013 to 2016 to investigate student visa fraud. It claimed to be based in Cranford, New Jersey, with plans to expand to Harrison, Hoboken, and Morristown.

== Background ==
The UNNJ sting operation took place following several high-profile student visa fraud cases involving phony universities, most notably Tri-Valley University in Northern California, an institution that offered classes but did not require students to attend.

== History of the sting operation ==
The operation was created in September 2013 by Homeland Security Investigations (HSI), a directorate of U.S. Immigration and Customs Enforcement (ICE).

The fake university had an extensive internet presence, including an elaborate website (Note: The website was www.unnj.edu (Archived March 27, 2016, at the Wayback Machine). The website included this content: The University of Northern New Jersey was founded in 2012 after several years of witnessing the challenges inexperienced graduates face in a diverse and global job market. The founders of the University of Northern New Jersey sought to better educate students by focusing on real world employment knowledge and skills that parallel traditional academia at an affordable cost. By assembling a dedicated and experienced staff who are eager to share their knowledge and experience with students, UNNJ is able to better prepare students to enter the global work force as new leaders in their field by learning inside and outside the classroom. The University of Northern New Jersey is nationally accredited by the Accrediting Commission of Career Schools and Colleges and the Commission on English Language Accreditation. UNNJ is also certified by the U.S. Department of Homeland Security, Student and Exchange Visitor Program to educate international students. (Archived March 12, 2016, at the Wayback Machine (emphasis omitted).)) with a .edu domain name, a crest (bearing a remarkable similarity to that of Princeton University, itself located in New Jersey) with a Latin motto, and a Facebook presence led by the university's "president"—a "carefully crafted character" named Dr. Steven Brunetti who had a LinkedIn page. (Note: The website included a page for an "Office of the President" (Archived 2016-03-07 at the Wayback Machine).) The sting included a fictitious campus at 25 Commerce Drive, Cranford, New Jersey. (Note: According to the website, the fictitious university had two locations, a "Main Campus and Admissions" at 25 Commerce Drive, Cranford, New Jersey, and an "Administrative Office" at 20 Commerce Drive, Suite 135, Cranford, New Jersey. (Archived March 6, 2016, at the Wayback Machine.)) At the end of the operation, the rented space at 25 Commerce Drive was vacated and the website went down.

The fake university was recognized by the State of New Jersey and was accredited by the Accrediting Commission of Career Schools and Colleges (ACCSC). The director of the ACCSC stated that it had accredited the "university" to cooperate with the federal investigation.

In April 2016, Paul J. Fishman, the U.S. Attorney for the District of New Jersey, and Sarah R. Saldaña, the director of ICE, announced that the sting operation had ended with the arrests of 21 people. Federal agents posed as university officials and worked with the 21 arrested individuals, who were brokers who recruited international students, mostly from China and India, to go to UNNJ. According to federal authorities, the brokers knew that UNNJ did not offer real classes yet "charged the students in a scheme that allowed them to maintain their student visas and stay in the country" and in some cases illegally arranged for jobs and work visas. According to Saldaña, the brokers arranged student visas for 1,076 people, most of whom will have their visas revoked. The authorities described the brokers as engaging in illicit "pay to stay" visa scam.

== Effects ==
The New York Times reported that, "in interviews, more than a dozen students insisted that they were collateral damage in the sting operation, duped by both the brokers and the government." The students said that they had been deceived by the government through "in-person meetings with the university's supposed president, letters confirming they could work instead of go to class, and Twitter messages about classes canceled because of bad weather."

Rachael Merola, a senior researcher at the Observatory on Borderless Higher Education, said that the U.S. government's establishment of a fake university was a "novel strategy" in combating student visa fraud. Merola said that the strategy was highly effective but would likely not be replicated in the future, stating: "If anything, the massive amount of coverage that this got would sound an alarm and might act as a deterrent in the future to unscrupulous agents and sham universities." Ultimately, the scheme was replicated a mere two years later with the equally fictitious University of Farmington.

== Class action litigation and settlement ==
On May 3, 2022, the U.S. District Court for the District of New Jersey granted final approval to a class-action settlement for all students who enrolled in UNNJ for any length of time, plus their spouses and children. The settlement reverses many of the immigration-related harms suffered by members of the class.

The settlement follows a decision by a federal appeals court that the students had a right to judicial review of the Government's decision to terminate their student status and take other adverse immigration action against them.

== See also ==
- Reagan National University
- University of Farmington
- Entrapment
