= Bogus colleges in the United Kingdom =

Illegal higher education institutions in the UK

In the United Kingdom a bogus college is a fake college or university used as part of an immigration and visa scam, whereby people from overseas can apply for a British student visa and illegally reside in the United Kingdom. They have also been set up as a money making scam, selling fake qualifications which have no official accreditation, often at the taxpayer's expense.

To tackle the problem of bogus colleges the British Government established a register of approved education providers in 2005. The register requires potential applicants for student visas to prove that they would be attending a legitimate college or university during their stay in the United Kingdom. The Home Office appoints accreditation bodies to inspect any colleges which wish to take international students. However, the register came in for criticism in 2008 after the government admitted that since the register's establishment almost half of the institutions on the list had been struck off following inspections. The system has been revised a number of times since its establishment.

In April 2009 the UK Border Agency introduced tougher rules for international students coming to the United Kingdom. These included fingerprinting and checking potential applicants against security and immigration watchlists.

== Notable examples ==
One of the most high-profile cases of a bogus college is the East London–based Cambridge College of Learning, which sold several thousand fake postgraduate diplomas in business management and IT, charging between £2,500 and £4,000 for each qualification. Immigration officials became suspicious about the college – which is unconnected to University of Cambridge – after the Home Office received 2,542 applications for post-study visas in a period of two months. When the UK Border Agency subsequently raided the premises in December 2008 they discovered just three classrooms and eleven desks. Students registered with the college were told that their visas were invalid and that they must return home.

In another instance of bogus college activity, a 2009 Home Office investigation was launched after the British newspaper The Times presented evidence that hundreds of men from Pakistan's North West Frontier had paid at least £1,000 to a gang to be admitted into bogus colleges, while some paid £2,500 for fake diplomas, attendance records and degrees. A total of eleven colleges were established in London, Bradford and Manchester, including one which had enrolled eight terrorism suspects arrested in Manchester and Liverpool in April 2009. The college had three small classrooms and three teachers for 1,797 students.

The Home Office inquiry followed an investigation by The Times which compiled a dossier on bogus colleges that included details of another college which claimed to have 150 students, but secretly enrolled 1,178 and offered places to an extra 1,575. Two Liverpool universities admitted they had given places to four "graduates" from one of the bogus colleges, the Manchester College of Professional Studies.

== Other examples ==
Higher Education Degree Datacheck (HEDD), the UK's official service for candidate verification and university authentication, has named a number of 'bogus universities' on its blog, often with names similar to genuine UK universities. These include:

- International University Robert Gordon (not to be confused with the genuine Robert Gordon University)
- Manchester Open University (not to be confused with the genuine University of Manchester or the Open University)
- The University of McAllister
- Rutland University, Leicester (not to be confused with the genuine Leicester University)
- Bransfield University
- Wolverhamton University (not to be confused with the genuine Wolverhampton University); following an investigation by HEDD the website associated with this 'bogus university' later changed its name to Warnswick University (not to be confused with the genuine Warwick University)
- Wolverhamton University (not to be confused with the genuine Wolverhampton University)
- Cambridge Training College Britain (not to be confused with the genuine University of Cambridge)

== See also ==
- Accreditation mill
- Diploma mill
- .edu
- Educational accreditation
- Essay mill
- Ghost colleges in Australia
- Gillian McKeith
- Job fraud
- List of animals with fraudulent diplomas
- List of fictional British and Irish universities
- List of unaccredited institutions of higher education
- List of unrecognized higher education accreditation organizations
- Mickey Mouse degrees
- Name It and Frame It?
- Unaccredited institutions of higher education
- University of Farmington
- Underwater basket weaving
- Who's Who scam
