= Summit University =

Summit University may refer to:

- Summit University, Offa, Kwara State, Nigeria
- Clarks Summit University, Pennsylvania, United States
- Summit University, educational branch of The Summit Lighthouse, historically at Malibu, Montana and other locations in the United States
- Summit University, Louisiana, a diploma mill in the United States
