= Saudi Australians =

Saudi Australians سعوديون أستراليون
Total population
- Saudi; 10,518 (by birth, 2011); 3,696 (by ancestry, 2011)

Regions with significant populations
- Sydney

Languages
- Australian English, Arabic (one of the dialects of Saudi Arabia)

Religion
- Islam

Related ethnic groups
- other Arab Australians

Saudi Australians (Arabic: سُعُودِيُّونْ أُسْتْرَالِيُّونْ, romanized: suʿudiyyūn ʼustrāliyyūn) refers to Australian nationals or citizens with origins in Saudi Arabia as well the general Saudi expatriate community in Australia. There are thousands of Saudis living in Australia; they can be found in all major urban centres including Sydney, Melbourne and Brisbane and make up a substantial representation in the Arab Australian community.

The Kingdom of Saudi Arabia has undergone significant cultural and economic reform in the 21st century; with the introduction of women's voting rights in 2015 and their right to drive in 2018. In 2016, Saudi Arabia embarked on the Saudi Vision 2030 framework, aiming to expand their international reputation by reducing their economic dependence on oil. It has been said that this cultural development has improved Saudi Arabia's international standing and transformed foreign relations with Australia from strictly economically based to one grounded in mutual respect.

A significant number of Saudis are international students; each year, hundreds of Saudi students choose to study in Australian universities under the King Abdullah Scholarship Program. As of 2026, there are currently 4,319 Saudi Arabian students studying in Australia.

Some Saudi Australians came from Saudi Arabia as refugees; their families or the authorities wanted to persecute or murder them.

== Background of Saudi immigration to Australia ==
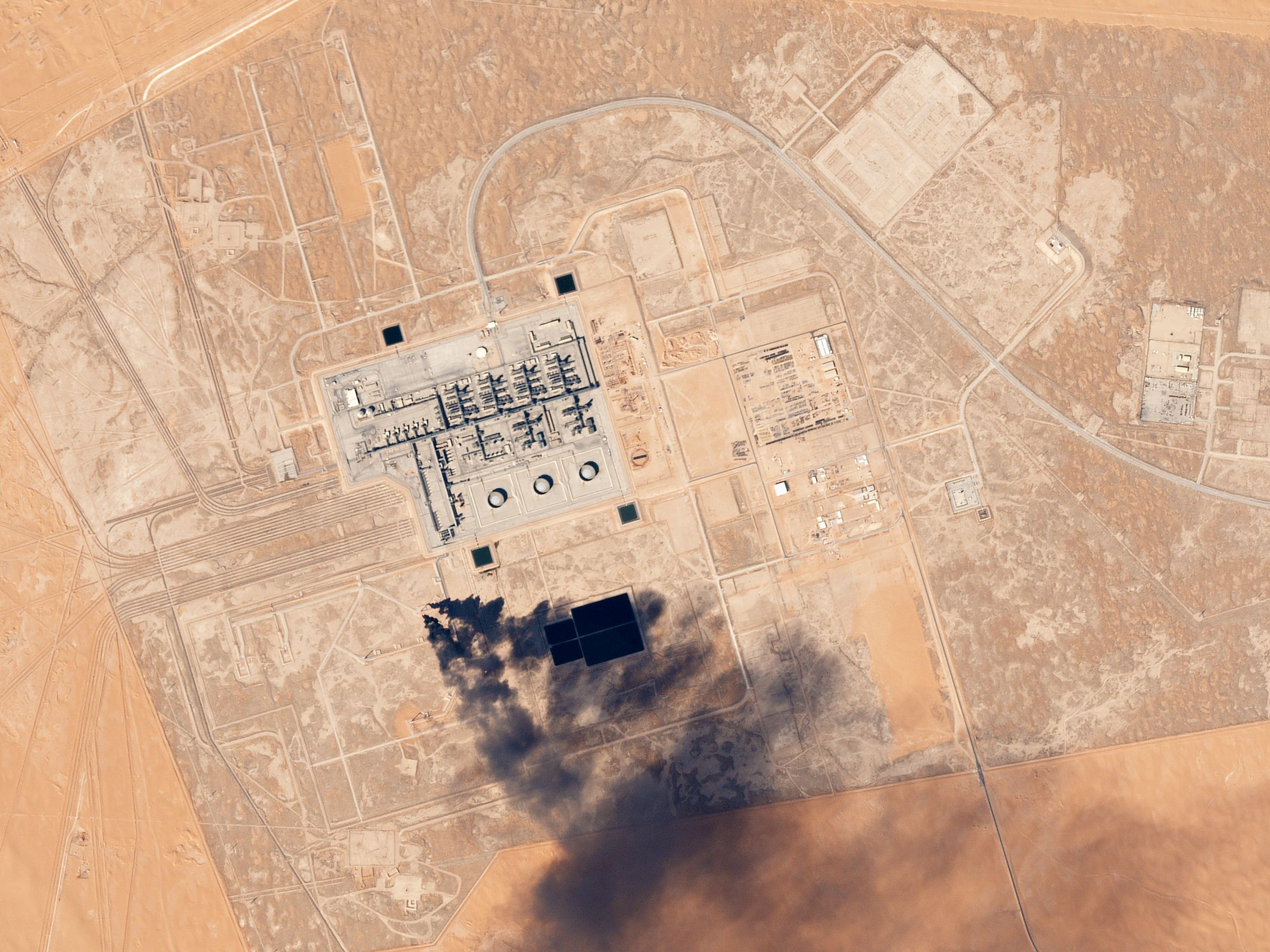
Oil Field in Saudi Arabia

Saudi Arabia and Australia uphold peaceful bilateral relations that have maintained a steady increase of Saudi immigration to Australia. The economic relationship between the two nations also cannot be overlooked. The goods and services trade between Saudi Arabia and Australia reached $1.79 billion in 2019, making it Australia's 27th largest trade partner. This relationship is strengthened through their shared membership within the G20, chaired by Saudi Arabian King Salman Bin Abdul-Aziz Al Saud, along with their mutual economic and trade dependence. A series of changes to Australia's immigration policy in the latter period of the 20th century, notably the conclusion of the White Australia policy in 1973, saw a drastic increase in overseas migration to Australia. Australia's high number of overseas born residents (26%) is second only to Saudi Arabia itself whose overseas born population makes up 32%. Saudi Arabia, however, does not provide citizenship to these people; only working visas. The number of Saudi Arabians who currently reside in Australia is estimated at 14,214: 10,519 by birth and 3,696 by ancestry. Despite Australia's immigration law changes that took place in the 1970s, Saudi Arabian immigration to Australia did not see a spike until the early 21st century. According data from the Australian census, 70% of Saudi Arabian immigration to Australia took place between 2006 and 2015. Of these migrants, a majority of them stay for a temporary period of time, usually for study or work purposes, and return to Saudi Arabia with a qualification or work experience. In 2018, there was an estimated 4,500 Saudi Arabian students that attended an education facility in Australia. The increasing number of Saudi students studying in Australia can be attributed to the King Abdullah Scholarship Program, which provides economic stimulus packages to allow and encourage Saudi students to study overseas. Due to the inclusionary nature of this program, the students often come from varying backgrounds, cultures, religions and geographical regions within Saudi Arabia, contributing to the differing experiences of students in Australia. Of these students, over three quarters of them are male and as for a woman wishing to take part in the program must have a male relative accompanying her overseas. This is representative of the overall demographics of Saudi Arabians in Australia, with the majority of immigrants being men. The male majority can be accredited to the laws and legislations surrounding travelling in and out of Saudi Arabia. Women are not permitted to travel around Saudi Arabia (or leave the Kingdom) without the supervision of a male guardian; being a husband, relative or sponsor.

== Middle Eastern immigration to Australia ==
The conclusion of the White Australia Policy saw a spike in immigration (particularly as a result of conflict or humanitarian crises) to Australia. Between the years of 1945 and 1995, 500,000 refugees migrated to Australia, 90,000 of which were from the Middle East. Saudi Arabians do not account for the majority, making up only 1.8% of Middle Eastern immigrants in Australia. Instead, 40% of Middle Eastern immigrants come from Lebanon, followed by 16.8% from Iraq and 15.7% from Turkey. Of these immigrants, over half (58.1%) reside in Sydney, generally congregating in areas where other Middle Eastern immigrants live. This results in concentration of particular ethnic groups in specific geographically urbanised areas, such as the Middle Eastern population in Auburn, Sydney. The experiences of immigrants differ greatly; with the results of a recent study finding that Middle Easterners in Australia face a much higher proportion of discrimination than their non-Middle Eastern counterparts. The same study found that Middle Eastern males in particular are the subject of this discrimination, specifically within police disputes. This however, is not representative of the experience of all Saudi Arabians.

== Saudi students in Australia ==
The vast majority of Saudi Arabian migration to Australia is temporary and for study purposes. In 2018, there was an estimated 4,500 students studying at Australian universities. This number is accredited to the aforementioned King Abdullah Scholarship Program which was launched in 2005. The program provides financial assistance to students in order to encourage overseas study. Since 2005, the King Abdullah Scholarship Program has facilitated over 130,000 students to pursue studies overseas, costing the Saudi Arabian government 9 billion Saudi riyals (approximately 3.3 billion AUD) per year. The courses of which the program funds are dependent upon what the professional sector, namely governmental organisations and ministries, require in order to boost their industry. In 2020, the available undergraduate areas of study are medicine, medical science and health science. The aim of the program is to provide Saudi Arabian students with the best opportunity to acquire qualifications that will benefit the Saudi Arabian workforce and contribute to the development of the nation. The program, which accepts people from all across Saudi Arabia, has facilitated the move of thousands of Saudi Arabians with vastly different backgrounds to Australia. It has also strengthened the diplomatic relationship between Australia and Saudi Arabia, after the signing of the Memorandum of Co-operation in Higher Education in 2010. This agreement is a bond of mutual respect between the two nations, facilitating the ease at which students from the respective states are able to study within the other.

=== Experience of Saudi Students in Australia ===
The huge difference in culture and social norms between Saudi Arabia and Australia contributes largely to the experience of Saudi Arabian students. The literature surrounding international students clearly shows that there is a difficult adjustment period that student must undertake when studying in a new country, including finding accommodation, financial burdens, language barriers and cultural shifts. As the official language of Saudi Arabia is Arabic, students not only have to face a new language, but also a new alphabetic script. It is shown that students with high proficiency in the language of their host country succeed academically at a much higher rate than those who do not. A lack of ability for students to speak in English also impacts their socio-cultural adjustment and ability to make friends. There have been reports of Saudi women, in particular, who experience social isolation or exclusion in Australia. This is often due to popular culture -driven understandings of Saudi culture, stereotyping women as oppressed. Women who report this social ostracisation generally accredit it to their choice of wearing a Hijab. It has been observed that when there is a large cultural difference between the two countries, students find cultural adjustment much more difficult. As such, the huge gulf between Saudi Arabian culture and Australian culture contributes to the elongated transition period facing Saudi students in Australia. The Saudi Ministry of Higher Education encourage Saudi students to partake in a course prior to their departure to overseas study. This course urges students to maintain their cultural identity and norms upon arrival to their host country. This has led to the formation of Saudi student clubs across Australia, allowing for Saudi students to socialise with each other. These clubs are maintained by the Saudi Arabian Cultural Mission.

=== Gender segregation ===
The cultural adjustment of Saudi students is also made difficult by the differing social norms surrounding gender relations. In Saudi Arabia, the cultural norm is a strictly defined segregation between the males and females, specifically in schools, universities and the professional workplace. In Australia, the genders function alongside one another in educational facilities, workplaces and society as a whole. As a result, it has been observed that in professional environments, Saudi Arabian students are generally more reserved around those of the opposite sex. The nature of the relationship between the sexes in Saudi Arabia also contributes to the ratio of temporary stays versus those who apply for long-term visas. There is great cultural significance surrounding the institution of marriage in Saudi Arabia. As cited by the World Bank Development Indicators, the mean age that women get married in Saudi Arabia is 26.6, while according to the Australian Bureau of Statistics, the average age in Australia is 30.4. The cultural pressure to get married at a younger age in Saudi Arabia results in many students returning straight home after completing their studies in Australia in order to get engaged. Despite this, according to the SBS Cultural Atlas, "Many Saudis enjoy their lifestyle in Australia, commenting that they gain a greater sense of self-confidence and independence."

== Saudi Arabian refugees ==
The Middle East has become a peninsula characterised by conflict in the past five decades. As a result, 40% of the world's 60 million displaced people emerge from the Arab world. This number has deemed the Middle Eastern refugee situation as a major humanitarian crisis. These statistics however, refer to the Middle East as a whole and the numbers are largely accounted for by Syrian and Palestinian refugees. The exact number of refugees emerging from Saudi Arabia are unknown. What is known is that the majority of those fleeing Saudi Arabia are women. In the past decade, there has been large cultural development in the rights of Saudi Arabian women, such as their right to access healthcare without a male guardian. Whilst there have been some developments, Saudi Arabia is still ranked 141 out of 149 on the Gender Gap Index. Restrictions are placed on women's ability to travel without a male guardian, making it difficult for them to seek refuge in other nations. Of the women who do flee, little choose to come to Australia. A recent report found that Australian border forces have been turning away Saudi Arabian women who arrive at the border without male guardianship.

== See also ==
- Australia–Saudi Arabia relations
- Australians in Saudi Arabia
