= Ghost colleges in Australia =

Type of educational institution

Ghost colleges are education providers that have students enrolled on paper, but offer little or no legitimate instruction. Students at ghost colleges may rarely or never attend classes or engage in academic activities, and are often enrolled in order to obtain a student visa and engage in paid work rather than to study. In Australia, ghost colleges are typically private vocational colleges that enroll large numbers of international students, particularly students from India and Nepal. Media investigations and government inquiries have alleged that these providers offer little genuine instruction or assessment and operate largely as “visa factories” to facilitate migration to Australia. Unlike a diploma mill, students at ghost colleges are often primarily motivated by their desire for a student visa, and may have little interest in or use for their intended qualification.

In August 2024, the Australian Government announced that it would be cracking down on ghost colleges, shutting down 150 dormant providers and issuing warning notices to another 140. This was part of a broader suite of migration reforms enacted by the Albanese government, primarily targeted at reducing international student numbers and cracking down on abuse of the migration system. As a result of these reforms, student visa refusal rates have significantly increased, particularly for vocational study by students from 'high-risk' countries.

== History ==
The term "ghost colleges" was first used in the context of Australian private vocational educational providers in around 2018. In January of that year, the Review of the National Vocational Education and Training Regulator Act 2011 (commonly known as the Braithwaite Review) found integrity issues across the vocational educational sector, finding that "seriously unscrupulous behaviour" was causing harm "not only to the sector’s reputation but [also] the wellbeing – financial and emotional – of a significant cohort of students". This followed a steep rise in institutions applying for Vocational Education and Training (VET) and Commonwealth Register of Institutions and Courses for Overseas Students (CRICOS) registration, which would allow them to offer courses to student visa holders. In response to this steep increase in applications and the concerns about quality and integrity raised in the Braithwaite Review, from 1 July 2018 the Australian Skills Quality Authority (ASQA) began applying greater scrutiny to new applications and imposing a two year initial registration period. This led to a decrease in new VET and CRICOS registrations.

In 2015, Baljit "Bobby" Singh was charged with numerous fraud offences over the running of the St Stephen Institute of Technology following an ASQA audit. Singh was found to have used fraudulent enrolments and plagiarised assignments to defraud the government of $2 million. Singh was ultimately sentenced to 6 years in prison in 2018.

A major investigation into ghost colleges was published by The Age and The Sydney Morning Herald in August 2023. The reporters visited many private colleges in Melbourne and found that, despite enrolling tens of thousands of students on paper, almost no students were in attendance at many of these colleges over a period of several months. The investigation highlighted an explosion in international student numbers and in the number of vocational colleges, and quoted many insiders as saying that most enrolees at some private vocational colleges were in Australia to work rather than to study. The owner of a vocational college described in the investigation as reputable was quoted as saying that "If you put pressure on students to attend, they switch to a college where there won’t be pressure and they can work". Following this reporting, the Australian government signalled that it would be taking steps to crack down on fraudulent practices in the sector.

A 2022 leaked government memo reported by The Age revealed that many students were exploiting a loophole that allowed for "concurrent study". Students would obtain a visa by enrolling in a university, and once they arrived in Australia they would enrol in a cheaper vocational course while discontinuing their original university course. This allowed them to more easily access a student visa from offshore through their enrolment at a more reputable institution, and then once they had transferred to a ghost college, they would be able to more easily work in Australia without the study commitments of a university degree.

The 2023 Inquiry into Australia’s tourism and international education sectors by the Parliamentary Joint Standing Committee on Foreign Affairs, Defence and Trade highlighted "predatory practices" by education agents who "poach" students from other institutions in order to take advantage of this loophole, and recommended that the government "take firm action to address persistent and deep-seated integrity issues in the private Vocational Education and Training (VET) sector". The inquiry noted that many providers had lax monitoring of attendance and that some agents and providers were facilitating visa fraud. Christine Nixon's 2023 Rapid Review into the exploitation of Australia's visa system (the Nixon Review) also found significant exploitation of the student visa system and recommended greater enforcement and monitoring of migration agents, particularly in the vocational education sector. Both inquiries also noted reports of student visas being used to facilitate criminal activity, including sex trafficking, wage theft and scams.

The number of international student enrolments in vocational education programs rose from 157,119 in 2015 to 351,704 in 2024. By 2024, there were a total of 1,018,799 international student enrolments in Australia. The number of international students from India and Nepal had risen particularly dramatically, from 32,000 in 2013 to 143,000 in 2023.

== Reforms ==
Policy changes to address these problems were first announced in October 2023. Under these measures, colleges were banned from paying commissions to education agents to poach students from other institutions. College owners would also have to pass a "fit and proper person test", and providers would be made to monitor student attendance. A 2007 rule change had previously meant that providers did not have to report attendance.

This crackdown on ghost colleges was part of a wider suite of policies announced in 2023 and 2024 to reform the international educational sector and reduce migration. These policies included a proposed cap on international student enrolments, a substantial increase in student visa application fees, and the issuance of Ministerial Direction 107, which required immigration officials to deprioritise ‘high-risk’ student visa applications. As a result of these policy changes, the rejection rate for student visas rose from 5% in January 2023 to over 30% in September 2023.

Under these changes, students were no longer allowed to transfer from a university to a vocational course in the first six months of their study. This had been identified as a common loophole used by non-genuine students intending to work rather than study in Australia. Students intending to exploit this loophole would enrol at a reputable university or other higher education institution in order to attain a student visa, and would then quickly transfer to a ghost college, allowing them to work in Australia with few, if any, study commitments. Student visa holders in Australia are only allowed to work for up to 20 hours per week, but this requirement had proven difficult to enforce, with many purported students working multiple jobs or engaging in gig work or cash-in-hand employment.

In August 2024 Minister for Skills and Training Andrew Giles issued a media release titled "Over 150 ghost colleges axed" in which he announced that the government would be shutting down 150 dormant providers and issuing warning notices to another 140. This announcement received criticism for being misleading, with the federal opposition pointing out that at least some of these 150 providers were not “ghost colleges”, and were in fact reputable providers who had simply ceased providing vocational courses.

== Debate ==
The degree to which any particular institution fits the definition of a “ghost college” is often disputed and is challenging for observers and regulators to ascertain, making it difficult to assess the prevalence of ghost colleges in Australia. Some colleges have falsified enrolment and attendance figures, making it difficult to determine the extent to which an institution is providing legitimate educational offerings. Government enquiries have found that there is a wide spectrum of compliance across the vocational education sector, from institutions that are almost entirely fraudulent, to those that offer some degree of training but with little actual student attendance, to those that are fully compliant with ASQA guidelines. It is therefore unknown how many of the 3,800 registered training organisations (RTOs) in Australia might plausibly be characterised as ghost colleges.

There has also been debate over the role of the students enrolled at ghost colleges. Some observers, such as University of Sydney Professor Salvatore Babones, have characterised ghost college enrolees as victims of unscrupulous providers. Some students of ghost colleges and other fraudulent providers have claimed that they were misled about the education they would receive and that they were taken advantage of by their institutions. But others have argued that many students of ghost colleges willingly seek student visas with no intention of legitimate study and even that they should be deported for exploiting the visa system. The international student reforms passed in 2023 and 2024 have been linked to a rise in onshore refugee visa applications, with some former student visa holders seeking to remain in Australia as refugees after the removal of their student visas.

== See also ==
- Bogus colleges in the United Kingdom
