= University of Northern Virginia =

For-profit university in Virginia, United States

Coordinates: 38°49′54.7″N 77°12′27.4″W

- Type: For-profit/Not accredited
- Active: 1998–2014
- Chancellor: Ali Dastmalchi
- Location: Annandale, Virginia, United States
- Colors: Yellow and green
- Website: www.unva.edu
- Location in Northern Virginia University of Northern Virginia (Virginia) University of Northern Virginia (the United States)

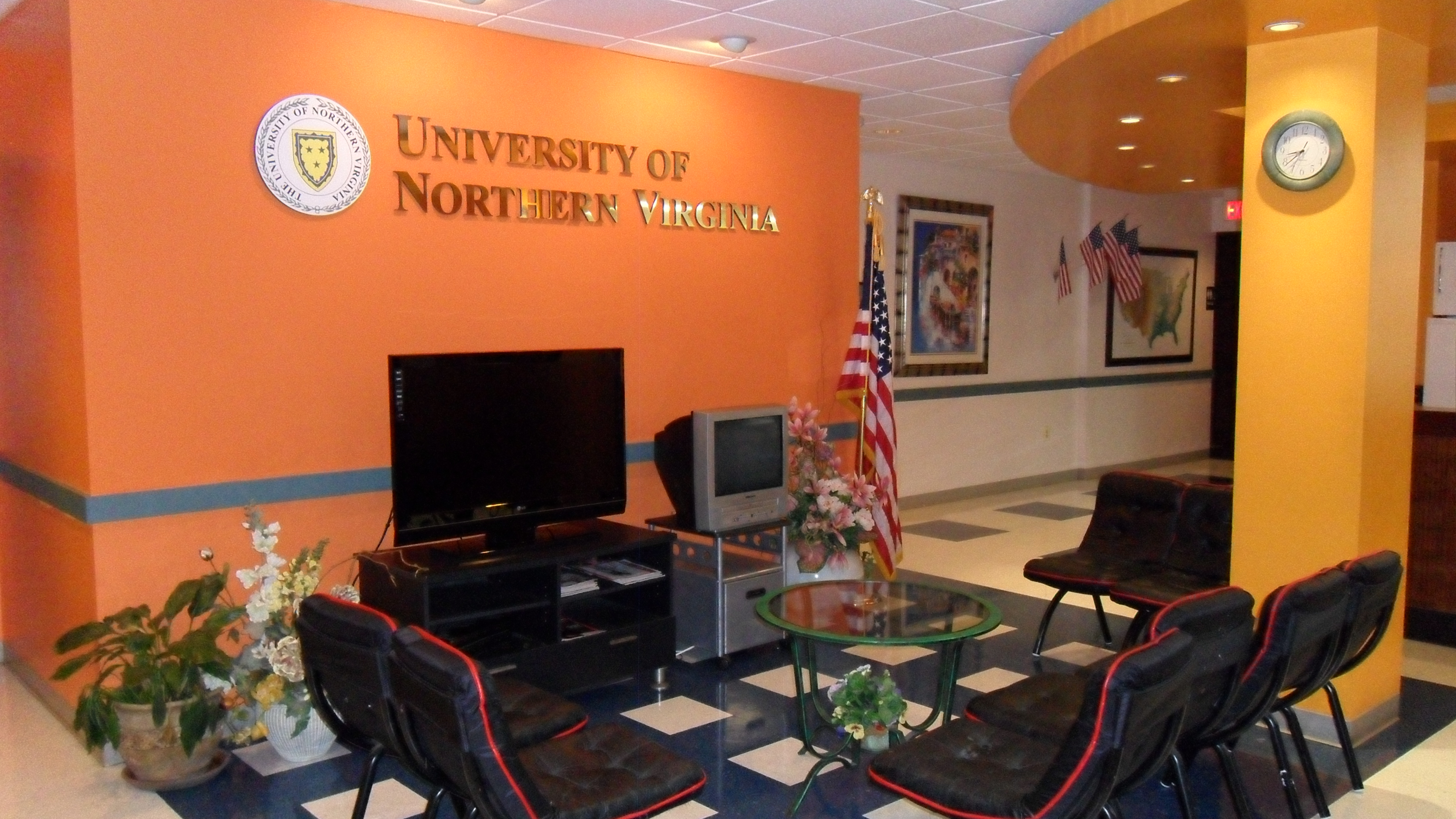
UNVA, Annandale Lobby

The University of Northern Virginia (UNVA) was an unaccredited for-profit private undergraduate and graduate university in Annandale, Virginia. The university offered bachelors, Masters and doctoral degrees. Although UNVA was not well known within the United States, it called itself the most popular American university for students from India.

UNVA has received government scrutiny and media coverage for its academic and immigration practices. U.S. Immigration and Customs Enforcement agents raided UNVA offices and informed school officials on July 28, 2011, that the government was ending UNVA's authorization to admit foreign students. Kapil Sibal, a minister in India's current cabinet, compared UNVA to a "sham university", stating UNVA does not have acceptable accreditation. Although media sources in India speculated that UNVA would close permanently in 2011, the university remained open and moved to South Dakota in 2013 when the Commonwealth of Virginia revoked its license to operate in that state. On October 1, 2013, U.S. Immigration and Customs Enforcement ended UNVA's authorization to admit foreign students.

In October 2013, UNVA announced its move to Sioux Falls, South Dakota. At its new location, UNVA is facing scrutiny as well. UNVA is investigated by the South Dakota Attorney General's office, and its office suite sits empty. As of March 6, 2014, UNVA had removed from its website the references to its new location in South Dakota.

== Ownership and governance ==
UNVA's founder and majority owner is Daniel Ho, an entrepreneur who owns Super Q Mart International Food, which operates three grocery stores in the Washington, D.C., area. It is headed by a chancellor. Chancellor David V. Lee resigned on August 19, 2011, stating that "discussions of my personal life have become a distraction for students and friends of UNVA." His resignation came after The Smoking Gun reported that Lee was involved with sadomasochistic sexual activities. Habib Khan took his place as chancellor. On August 9, 2012, Habib Khan resigned as chancellor. The new chancellor is the former academic dean of UNVA, Ali Dastmalchi. Ho is the registered agent.

== Enrollment ==
A March 2011 article in The Chronicle of Higher Education compared UNVA's enrollment practices and business model to those of Tri-Valley University, a California institution that was forced to close after facing an investigation for visa fraud. The Chronicle article states that UNVA enrolls Indian students who work full-time in "internships," without being required to attend actual classes.

UNVA was authorized by the United States government to enroll non-immigrant alien students. On July 28, 2011, when the U.S. Department of Homeland Security raided the university offices, US Immigration and Customs Enforcement suspended UNVA's SEVP approval and informed UNVA of the intent to revoke the SEVP approval. The school, however, maintained SEVP approval after the raid. Students are required to show they are attending classes and stayed in status for their visa.

== Accreditation ==
UNVA was accredited by the Accrediting Council for Independent Colleges and Schools, but this accreditation was revoked for unspecified reasons on August 6, 2008. The revocation of UNVA's accreditation led the Singaporean Ministry of Education to stop organizations in the country offering UNVA courses, affecting about 270 students. Singaporean educators and students called for more rigorous checking of academic standards. As of January 2010, the university was an applicant for Southern Association of Colleges and Schools (SACS) accreditation. As of August 2011, UNVA was not included on the SACS list of accredited, candidate, and applicant institutions. The University of Northern Virginia was certified to operate by the State Council of Higher Education for Virginia (SCHEV) as a non-accredited institution.

In the past, UNVA claimed accreditation by the American University Accreditation Council, which is not a recognized accreditation agency in the United States. The accreditor lists its address as the same as the site of a car repair shop owned by the Chairman of the university, while the listed phone number has an answering machine recorded message saying "This is D'Angelo, so get at me back." UNVA also claimed to have received full accreditation from an EU accreditation body for its Prague branch, but a closer examination of the accreditation certificate showed that the Swiss accreditation agency EduQua had only accredited the MBA program of the Prague branch of the Swiss institution Victoria University.

At one time, UNVA published a website admitting that it is not accredited.

== Affiliation ==
Four to twenty partner institutions grant UNVA degrees and allow students to enroll in UNVA courses. For example, students can enroll in UNVA business courses at Shines College in Singapore. In 2008, Shines College students were reported to be confused and unsure how they would be affected by news that UNVA had lost accreditation in the United States.

== History ==
In 2007, UNVA Properties, an investment group associated with UNVA, provided financing to Myers University (subsequently renamed Chancellor University) in Cleveland, Ohio, allowing that financially troubled non-profit school to continue operating. It was alleged that UNVA Properties wanted to acquire Myers University's regional accreditation for for-profit use.

In October 2009 it was reported that UNVA had sued Tiffin University, a private university based in Ohio, alleging that Tiffin had unlawfully attempted to "divert" students from UNVA's Prague school to Tiffin's newly established school there. Tiffin denied the claims.

One of the university's former accountants pleaded guilty, in May 2010, to stealing more than $225,000 from the university.

On July 28, 2011, The U.S. Department of Homeland Security raided the university, hauling away computers and boxes of paperwork and notifying the university that it may lose its ability to accept foreign students. UNVA, which had been authorized to issue 50 I-20 forms documenting that students were engaged in full-time study, had 2400 students on their books, 90% from India.

On July 16, 2013, the State Council of Higher Education for Virginia revoked UNVA's license to operate because the institution was not accredited by a recognized accreditor, forcing the institution to close. The university subsequently moved to Sioux Falls, South Dakota, where it reincorporated on August 23, 2013.

On October 1, 2013, U.S. Immigration and Customs Enforcement ended UNVA's authorization to admit foreign students.

On August 4, 2014, UNVA was sued by the state of South Dakota and Minnehaha county for violating a SD state law that prohibits universities from operating in SD without accreditation.

== See also ==
- Diploma mill
- List of unaccredited institutions of higher learning
- List of unrecognized accreditation associations of higher learning
