= Donald Arthur =

American admiral

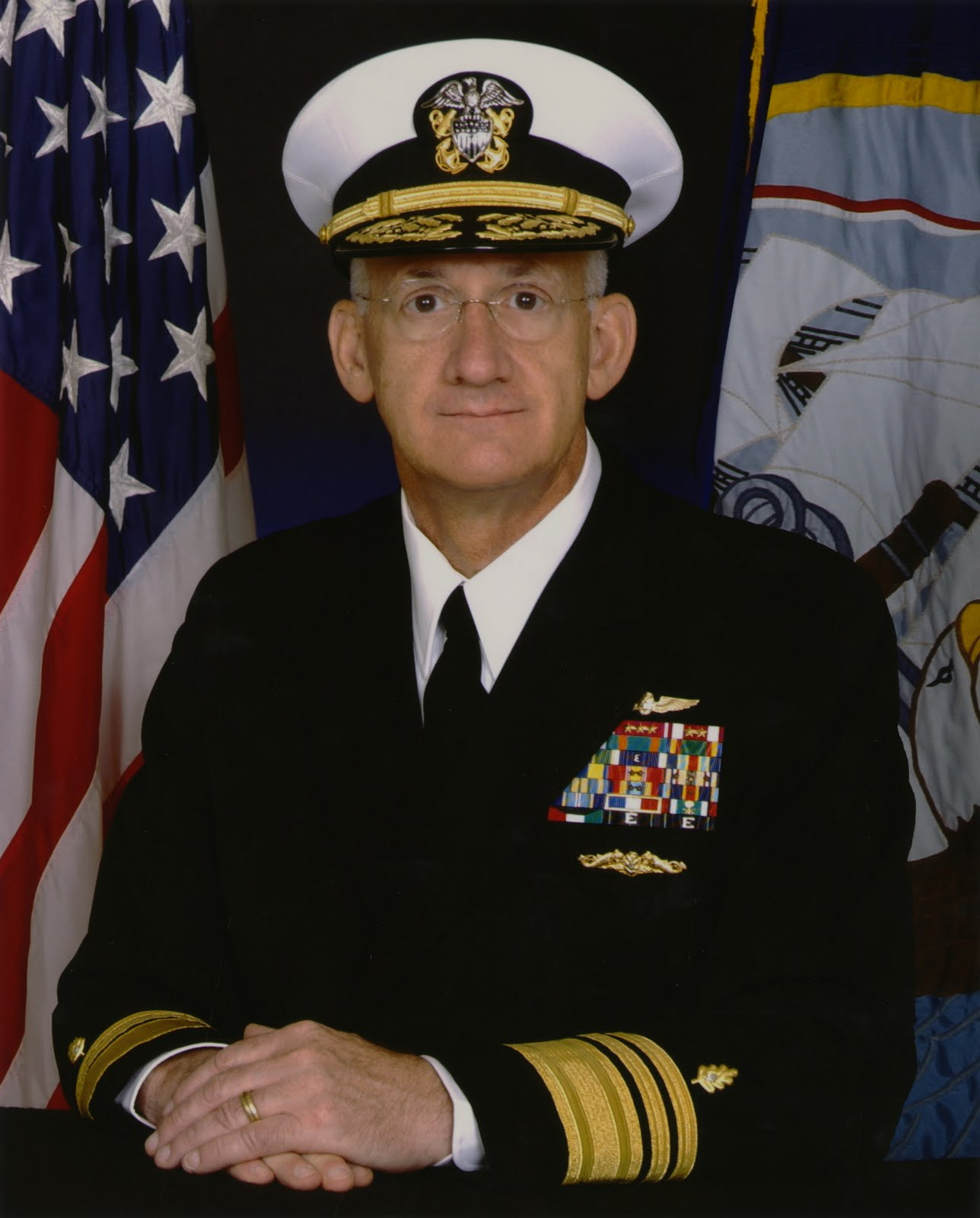

Surgeon General of the Navy
- In office 2004–2007

Personal details
- Born: January 4, 1950 (age 76) Northampton, Massachusetts

Military service
- Allegiance: United States
- Branch/service: United States Navy
- Years of service: 1974–2007
- Rank: Vice Admiral

Donald Caldwell Arthur Jr. (born January 4, 1950) is a former United States Navy medical corps vice admiral (VADM). He entered the Navy in 1974, qualified as both a naval flight surgeon and a Submarine Medical Officer, and eventually served as the 35th Surgeon General of the United States Navy from 2004 to 2007.

== Early life and education ==
Born in Northampton, Massachusetts, Arthur received a B.A. degree from Northeastern University and continued to pursue graduate studies in genetics there. He never completed his M.A. degree before joining the Navy in 1974. Arthur received his Navy sponsored medical degree from the College of Medicine and Dentistry of New Jersey in 1978 and then completed a residency in emergency medicine. He deployed with the Marine Corps Second Medical Battalion during Operation Desert Shield/Storm but never served under combat conditions.

In June 1992, Arthur received a Ph.D. in healthcare management from Century University in New Mexico. In August 1993, he received a J.D. from LaSalle University in Louisiana. The legitimacy of these two degrees was later called into question and both 'institutions' are considered to be diploma mills.

== Career ==
Arthur commanded Naval Hospital Camp Lejeune and National Naval Medical Center Bethesda. He served as director of Marine Corps Medical Programs, as assistant chief for Naval Health Care Operations and as Deputy Surgeon General.

Arthur's work on the Defense Health Board Task Force on Mental Health reflected his advocacy for PTSD in service members and combat veterans. He addressed the stigma of mental health in the military and made efforts to alleviate it. Arthur was an advocate for service members who incurred and suffered with Traumatic Brain Injury.

=== Credentials investigation ===
In 2005, author and activist B.G. Burkett urged then-Chairman of the Joint Chiefs of Staff Admiral Michael Mullen to investigate Arthur, claiming that some of his education credentials were inappropriate, because they had been obtained from unaccredited institutions, and that they had influenced his promotions within the Navy. In turn, Arthur claimed that he had been misinformed about the institution's accreditation, and that an internal investigation by the Navy had cleared him of any wrongdoing. Despite this, Arthur was quoted to have said the following about the incident at the time, "I could say I was naive, but I was 40 years old. And I didn't understand completely what was going on."

== Awards and decorations ==
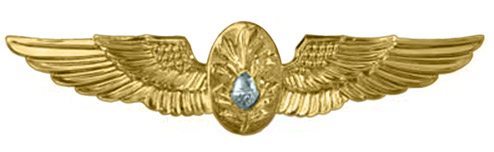

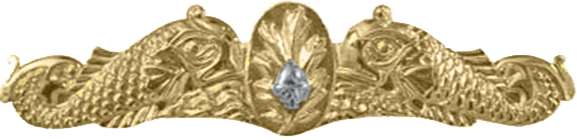

Navy Flight Surgeon Insignia
Navy Distinguished Service Medal with one gold award star
Legion of Merit with three gold award stars	Meritorious Service Medal with two award stars	Navy and Marine Corps Commendation Medal with two award stars
Navy and Marine Corps Achievement Medal	Combat Action Ribbon	Navy Unit Commendation
Navy Meritorious Unit Commendation with two bronze 3/16 service stars	Battle "E"	Fleet Marine Force Ribbon
Navy Expeditionary Medal	National Defense Service Medal with two service stars	Southwest Asia Service Medal w/ FMF Combat Operation Insignia and two service stars
Military Outstanding Volunteer Service Medal	Sea Service Deployment Ribbon with two service stars	Navy and Marine Corps Overseas Service Ribbon with service star
Special Operations Service Ribbon	Philippine Republic Presidential Unit Citation	Kuwait Liberation Medal (Saudi Arabia)
Kuwait Liberation Medal (Kuwait)	Navy Rifle Marksmanship Medal	Navy Pistol Marksmanship Medal
Submarine Medical Insignia

== Personal ==
Arthur is the son of Donald Caldwell Arthur Sr. (September 3, 1920 – September 27, 2007) and Mary Ann (Siconolfi) Arthur (March 24, 1926 – November 19, 2007). His father enlisted in the U.S. Army during World War II, serving at the Battle of the Bulge. Both born in Northampton, Massachusetts, his parents were married there on July 3, 1948. Arthur Jr. has one sister.

Arthur Jr. married Marianne Mele on August 18, 1973, in Tenafly, New Jersey. The couple had one child, but were divorced on December 18, 1980.

In the 2024 United States presidential election, Arthur endorsed Kamala Harris.
