= Higher Education Degree Datacheck =

UK degree verification service

Higher Education Degree Datacheck (Hedd) is the UK's official service for verifying academic degrees and authenticating universities. It also takes action against diploma mills purporting to be UK universities. It is funded by the UK government through the Higher Education Funding Council for England (HEFCE) and is run by Prospects.

Hedd was created by Prospects in partnership with HEFCE and the Department for Business, Innovation and Skills in response to fears about fake universities and CV fraud, and went live in 2012 after a beta launch in 2011. At the time, it was believed that there were twice as many fake universities in the UK as real ones. In 2014, it revealed that 8% of degrees submitted could not be verified, with the most common problem being claiming a first class degree when the actual award was at a lower classification. Hedd issued a warning in 2016 against posting graduation selfies with certificates shown, as this would allow fraudulent websites to see and copy the designs of degree certificates. By January 2017, Hedd had shut down more than 40 fake university websites since the UK government announced a crackdown in June 2015, and that it had had reports of over 90 bogus institutions. In December 2017 it officially partnered with the Chinese Service Centre for Scholarly Exchange to validate the degrees of UK graduates returning to or entering China.

== See also ==
- Bogus colleges in the United Kingdom
- Diploma mill
- List of unaccredited institutions of higher education
- Ofqual
- Job fraud
