= Hamilton University =

Unaccredited university in Evanston, Wyoming, United States

Hamilton University was an unaccredited institution based in Evanston, Wyoming, United States. According to the Oregon Office of Degree Authorization, it was first established in Hawaii as American State University. It has since been closed by court order in Wyoming and has relocated to the Bahamas under the name Richardson University.

== History ==
Since it had no real students and no faculty and was housed in buildings which had once been a Motel 6, Hamilton was widely thought to be a diploma mill. The school issued degrees based on "life experiences." Candidates for a degree were required to answer a few questions and write a small project of 2,000 words (about seven typed pages). The school issued Bachelor's, Master's, and even PhDs. The presence of a small church built in the parking lot had served to make the activity tax free due to federal and state laws, even though the church building had no pews; people in Evanston had never seen services there.

CBS News reported in 2004 that Hamilton was operated by Rudy Marn of Key West, Florida. Marn, an art collector and philanthropist, has a history of running diploma mills. In 2008, Marn pleaded guilty to tax fraud and was sentenced in October 2008 by Casper federal court to two years in prison and ordered to pay $620,000 in restitution to the IRS. Marn, Bureau of Prisons # 10728-091, served time in Federal Correctional Institution, Beaumont Low in the Federal Correctional Complex, Beaumont, and was released in September 2010.

The website used the .edu domain, because unaccredited institutions were allowed to use such domains before October 29, 2001.

== Academics and accreditation ==
Hamilton claimed to be accredited by the American Council of Private Colleges and Universities (ACPCU). The ACPCU, which was "set up by Hamilton, for Hamilton" has no authorization from the United States Department of Education or the Council for Higher Education Accreditation. Former FBI consultant John Bear called it a "fake accrediting agency set up by the Wyoming-based diploma mill, Hamilton University."

== Criticism and controversy ==
An investigation by the TV news program 60 Minutes revealed that some people in positions of power actually held phony degrees issued by Hamilton University, such as Cessna CEO Jack J. Pelton.

The most notable "graduate" of Hamilton University was former U.S. government official Laura Callahan, a key figure in the "Project X" email scandal involving the disappearance of thousands of White House emails that had been subpoenaed by Congress. Callahan's diplomas from HU had enabled her to get a high position in the United States Department of Homeland Security. A probe of her claims evolved into an investigation by the Government Accountability Office of Federal employees who had paid diploma mills with taxpayer funds.

When the CBS 60 Minutes video crew visited the campus, there was no evidence of any students or faculty, but three office workers were present.

== People with Hamilton degrees ==
- Laura Callahan, former senior director at the United States Department of Homeland Security
- Ben Hanlon, the father and leader of the Wild Hanlons from the NBC television show Treasure Hunters, claims a Masters and PhD from Hamilton University
- Jack J. Pelton, former CEO of Cessna Aircraft Co and current Chairman of the Experimental Aircraft Association

== Connected institutions ==
- American State University (Moved to Wyoming and renamed Hamilton University)
- Richardson University (Bahamas) (Hamilton University, renamed and relocated again after Wyoming shut the operation down)

== See also ==
- List of unaccredited institutions of higher learning
- List of unrecognized accreditation associations of higher learning
