= Australians in Saudi Arabia =

Ethnic group in Saudi Arabia

Total population
- 5,000

Regions with significant populations
- Riyadh · Jeddah

Languages
- English (Australian) · Arabic

Religion
- Islam, Roman Catholicism and Protestantism

Australians in Saudi Arabia are a sizeable community consisting mainly of expatriates. Their population is estimated to be anywhere up to 5,000 with the majority based in major commercial centres such as Riyadh and Jeddah. Most Australian citizens in Saudi Arabia tend to be occupational-oriented and are employed mainly in the health, education, construction and technology sectors. There are approximately 1,000 Australians who live in Jeddah alone, a city which serves as the country's main port and economic hub. In addition, thousands of Australian Muslims travel and stay in Saudi Arabia each year, often intending to visit the two holiest cities of Islam, Mecca and Medina. Many expatriates in Saudi Arabia are attracted to what they refer to as "the good life", including large salaries and tax-free jobs, consistent weather and a comfortable social life within their housing compounds.

With both countries being heavily invested in one another this was further reinforced with the development of the King Abdullah Scholarship program which increased educational opportunities for Saudi Arabian students as well as extended the educational opportunities for Australians in Saudi Arabia.

== History ==
To the east of Saudi Arabia along the Persian Gulf, are the country's abundant oil fields, that since the 1960s, have made Saudi Arabia synonymous with petroleum wealth. It is among this region that Australians have settled their expat communities, harnessing the need for individuals in the economic, technology and export sector and growing the population of Australians living in Saudi Arabia.

== Politics ==
=== Women in Saudi Arabia ===
Legal status for women in Saudi Arabia is extremely different to the likes of Australian politics and law. In Saudi Arabia, the legal system requires all women to have a male guardian, this guardian has authority to make a number of decisions on behalf of women, similar to that of a minor. Women were only granted the right to vote in the 2015 elections. This progressive landmark change in law created a monumental shift on the lives of Saudi Arabian women and the stigma behind being a woman in Saudi Arabia.

There was some hesitation to register to vote as there was still a lot of bureaucratic chores that accompanied the registration process with statistics from a 2020 article from news journal ‘Foreign Policy’ that women only makeup 6% of the 1.7 million people electorate.

== Living conditions ==
Most expats living in Saudi Arabia find themselves living in Western compounds, this housing is like living in a small self-contained holiday village that can have a range of amenities with anything from multiple pools to restaurants, markets and even shopping malls. Within the compounds the dress is Western, and some compounds ban any form of Saudi dressing.

Generally accommodation on western compounds in Saudi Arabia is reasonable comfortable, quite spacious and can be rather lavish living quarters compared to off compound housing. Most westerners particularly Australian Expats chose to live within these compounds due to the freedom and security, particularly having young children security is a large reason why compound living is so popular. Most expats have their accommodation costs paid directly by their employer who will also normally arrange housing, insurance, schools and even a healthcare plan.

== Economic overview ==
Saudi Arabia is one of the largest economies in the middle east; its population of around 33.4 million controls nearly 20% of the worlds conventional oil reserves. More recent years have seen attempts to diversify the economy away from petroleum.

=== "Saudization" ===
Saudization (Arabic: السعودة), officially known as Saudi nationalisation scheme, or Nitgat (Arabic: النطاقات) is the newest policy of the Kingdom of Saudi Arabia implemented by its Ministry of Labor and Social Development, whereby Saudi companies and enterprises are required to fill up their workforce with Saudi nationals up to a certain level yet still encourage a significant expat community.

=== Bilateral relations ===
As Australia's second largest market in the Middle East, Saudi Arabia is an important trading partner for Australia. Australia - Saudi Business ties have expanded with the Australian former Deputy Prime Minister Mark Vaile, former Queensland Premier, Anna Bligh and Australia Post CEO and then Chair of the Council for Australian-Arab Relations, Ahmed Fahour attending the March 2013 Joint Ministerial Commission meeting that saw the signing of a Memorandum of Understanding between the Australia-Saudi Business Council and the Council of Saudi Chambers of Commerce establishing the Saudi Australia Joint Business Council. There are over 5,000 Australian citizens employed in Saudi Arabia, mainly in health, education and other specialist areas. Saudi Arabia's needs are well suited to Australian capabilities. Saudi Arabia has a sound economy with a fast-growing and young population, a well-managed banking system, good infrastructure, and generally low import duties and barriers. Its business community is sophisticated and familiar with Western practices. Austrade is represented in both Riyadh and Jeddah.

== See also ==
- Australian diaspora
- Immigration to Saudi Arabia
- Saudi Australians
- Australians in the United Arab Emirates
