= University of Farmington =

Fake university in Michigan, US set up by ICE

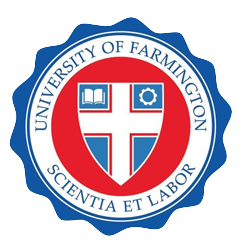
- Motto: Latin: Scientia et labor
- Type: Fake university
- Active: 2015–2019
- Location: Farmington Hills, Michigan, U.S.
- Website: universityoffarmington.edu

The University of Farmington was a fake university set up in 2015 in Michigan by the U.S. Immigration and Customs Enforcement. The sting operation, code-named "Paper Chase", was overseen by the United States Department of Homeland Security (DHS). Over 600 individuals were identified in the operation, many of whom face deportation from the United States for visa violations.

The sting was disclosed to the public on January 30, 2019, with The Detroit News reporting that the DHS and ICE HSI had arrested eight "recruiters" of Indian nationality and charged them on grounds of visa fraud and harboring aliens for profit. In total, the recruiters allegedly made more than $250,000 from the university in compensation. By early February 2019, 130 students (129 of whom were from India, and 127 of them specifically being from Andhra/Telangana states of India) from multiple cities had been arrested for violation of immigration laws, and were subject to deportation if convicted. In March 2019, ICE announced that 161 students had been arrested in total.

According to prosecutors, the students enrolled in the university solely to maintain their student-visa status and lengthen their stay in the US, despite being aware "that they would not attend any actual classes, earn credits or make academic progress towards an actual degree." However, the students' attorneys noted that the university had been listed as a legitimate school on the Department of Homeland Security website. The University of Farmington was also accredited by two school accreditation boards. The University of Farmington website made it impossible for students to know that it was fake. It offered instruction, classes, and degrees.

== University ==
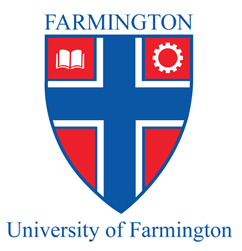
Secondary logo used by the "university"

The University of Farmington's headquarters was in the basement of the North Valley office complex located at 30500 Northwestern Highway in Farmington Hills. Its website claimed to "provide students from throughout the world a unique educational experience" and contained academic program details. It also claimed to be accredited by the Michigan Department of Licensing and Regulatory Affairs and the Accrediting Commission of Career Schools and Colleges and was also apparently authorized by the Student and Exchange Visitor Program to admit foreign students. According to The Times of India, there was hardly any way for prospective students to distinguish the institution from a real university, at least from its web presence. The university had a Twitter presence and the university's website featured program details, tuition pricing, and updates such as bad weather alerts. The yearly fee for undergraduates was $8,500, significantly lower than many other US institutions. The university did not have any instructors or actual classes.

According to Matt Friedman, who worked in the same complex, the university had no classrooms and he never saw anyone there. Other people who worked in the same building doubted the prosecutors' contention that everyone was willfully involved, claiming to have seen students arriving with backpacks and attempting to inquire about the university.

== Aftermath ==
Immediately following the disclosure of the sting, Ravi Mannam, an immigration lawyer based in Atlanta, criticized the operation as "misleading" and accused the government of utilizing "very questionable and troubling methods to get these foreign students to join the institution", since students were under the impression that their enrollment was being made in a legitimate program. Similar concerns have been echoed by various Indian news publications.

The same week, India issued a démarche asking for the immediate release of the students and requesting against any non-voluntary deportation. Some of the students were apparently released after an intervention by the Indian Consulate, which has also opened a hotline.

All of the Farmington recruiters, hired by the University of Farmington, were criminally charged and pleaded guilty. They faced jail time followed by deportation with a bar on re-entering the U.S. in the future. Of the student enrollees, immigration authorities by the end of 2019 had arrested around 250 people, followed in some cases by deportation, though others contested.

In 2020, lawyers for the University of Farmington students as a class filed suit against the U.S. government in the U.S. Court of Federal Claims for breach of their contract, seeking tuition fees of around $11,000 a year that were essentially stolen. The suit asked for the money back and punitive damages. The claims court dismissed the suit in 2022, claiming lack of jurisdiction, but in June 2024, a three-judge panel of the U.S. Court of Appeals for the Federal Circuit reinstated it. The panel ruled that the government "engaged in the sale of services", and that the students were "unaware that the University was not a university at all" and "the government did not provide the paid-for education" nor give the students their money back.

== See also ==
- Bishop Sycamore High School
- University of Northern New Jersey – another fake university by Homeland Security (2013–2016)
- Reagan National University
- Entrapment
- Diploma mills in the United States
