= René Drouin =

René A. Drouin is president and chief executive of the New Hampshire Higher Education Assistance Foundation (NHHEAF) Network, a nonprofit entity that provides higher education loans for New Hampshire students.

Drouin holds bachelor's and master's degrees in business administration, as well as a law degree received from Lasalle University in 1996. He joined the New Hampshire Higher Education Assistance Foundation Network in 1998 and was named to the position of president and CEO in 1997.

In 2004, Drouin was the focus of some criticism over his educational credentials. It was reported that his bachelor's degree was from Kensington University, an unaccredited school, and that his law degree was not from La Salle University in Philadelphia, but rather from a Louisiana diploma mill. Drouin answered the criticism by saying that he was unaware that the institutions were not legitimate and that the degrees had not aided his career.
