= Kensington University =

Defunct distance education institution from 1976 to 2003

- Type: Private, distance education
- Active: 1976–2003
- Founder: Alfred Calabro
- Location: Glendale, California (1976–1996), Oʻahu, Hawaiʻi (1996–2026)

Kensington University was an unaccredited distance education institution from 1976 to 2003 that was based at different times in Glendale, California and Oʻahu, Hawaiʻi. In 1996, the California Council for Private Postsecondary and Vocational Education found the institution having "little or no rigor or credible academic standards are necessary in order to be awarded an advanced degree." Kensington University was ordered shut down by the California authorities in 1996 and was again closed by Hawaiʻi court order in 2003.

The state of Texas criminalized the use of Kensington University degrees and considered the behavior as a misdemeanor under the Texas Penal Code.

== History ==
The school was founded in 1976 by Alfred Calabro in Glendale, California, as a "no fat, no bull" correspondence school to meet the needs of working adults. The university was housed in a Glendale office that also contained Calabro's law practice. Kensington awarded bachelor's, master's and doctoral degrees in a wide range of fields. The Hawaii branch was started in 1996.

As of 1976, Kensington University was an "authorized" independent postsecondary institution in the state of California. After the California Council for Private Postsecondary and Vocational Education was created in 1989 to regulate higher education institutions in the state, Kensington was required to obtain Council approval. In 1994, the council's first review of the institution found deficiencies. Following a protracted legal battle, Kensington University was ordered shut down by the California authorities in 1996. The California Council for Private Postsecondary and Vocational Education said that "little or no rigor or credible academic standards are necessary in order to be awarded an advanced degree at Kensington University." The school was then re-opened by Anthony Calabro in September 1996 in Oʻahu, Hawaiʻi, where it was later closed by court order in 2003.

== Notable alumni ==
In 1996, Kensington University reported having graduated 7,000 students in the previous two decades.

One of the notable people who received degrees from Kensington University is Jennifer Carroll, who served as Florida lieutenant governor and as a member of the Florida House of Representatives. She received an MBA degree from Kensington in 1995, but removed it from her personal biography in 2004 after a CBS News investigation informed her of concerns about the school's legitimacy. The news reports also led Carroll to resign from the National Commission on Presidential Scholars. René Drouin, who sat on an advisory committee at the U.S. Department of Education, also was identified by CBS News as a Kensington degree holder. Both Carroll and Drouin told reporters that they had worked hard in their Kensington degree programs and thought the academic programs were legitimate.

Martin S. Roden, an engineering professor at California State University at Los Angeles, obtained a doctorate from Kensington in 1982, by which time he already held a full professorship at Cal State. In 1996, he said Kensington was "not a fraud, but certainly no one going there would be compared to someone with a UCLA degree." He later told the Chronicle of Higher Education that he had the degree to avoid having to correct students who mistakenly addressed him as "Doctor".

The only Western degree displayed by the late North Korean head-of-state Kim Il Sung in his residence—and later his mausoleum, the Kumsusan Palace of the Sun—was from Kensington University.

Mark Whitacre, an American business executive previously served as a local division president at Archer Daniels Midland, claims on his personal website to have received a Juris Doctor, a Master of Business Administration, a PhD in psychology, and a PhD in economics from Kensington University.

== Texas Penal Law ==
According to the Texas Penal Code, it is a misdemeanor to use a degree from Kensington University "in a written or oral advertisement or other promotion of a business; or with the intent to: obtain employment; obtain a license or certificate to practice a trade, profession, or occupation; obtain a promotion, a compensation or other benefit, or an increase in compensation or other benefit, in employment or in the practice of a trade, profession, or occupation; obtain admission to an educational program in this state; or gain a position in government with authority over another person, regardless of whether the actor receives compensation for the position." The misdemeanor is punishable by a fine of up to $2,000, up to 180 days in jail, or both.
