= International students in Australia =

Australia ranked third in top study abroad destinations with a total market value of over 5 billion AUD (3.47 billion USD) generated by international students in 2018. In 2023, 786,891 international students were enrolled in educational programs in Australia, which was 27% higher than the previous year. In 2024 this is forecasted to increase again by 18%. They come to gain a high-quality education, possibly immigrate, or to experience a different life. Each year, many new international students will enroll in Australian courses and add to the already significant international student body around the country.

Australia has the highest ratio of international students per capita in the world by a large margin. In 2019, international students represented an average 26.7% of the student body population in Australian universities. International education therefore represents one of the country's largest exports and has a pronounced influence on the country's demographics, with a significant proportion of international students remaining in Australia after graduation on various skill and employment visas.

Australia has by far the highest percentage of international students in the world, relative to total population, with 1 international student per 33.6 people in 2023 (786,891 students, 26.45 million residents). If the 18% growth seen in 2024 continues, this number will increase to 1 in 28.8 (3.48% of the population).

According to data released by the Departure of Education and Training of the Australian Government in 2023, China is the most significant source of international students to Australia. India had the second largest proportion of the enrollments, followed by Nepal, Colombia and Philippines.

All international students are required to obtain a valid student visa before they arrive in Australia. When students apply for their student visa through the Department of Home Affairs of the Australian Government, they need to submit the electronic Confirmation of Enrolment (CoE) and a compulsory English language proficiency test score to lodge their visa application. Also, each student visa applicant must prove that they have enough financial ability to pay for their tuition fees, books and daily living expenses while they study in Australia.

After the Australian government published the new immigration policy, international students are encouraged to study, work and stay in regional areas in Australia, such as Adelaide, Tasmania and the Northern Territory. In order to protect the local workforce, the Australian government intends to reduce the number of accepted migrants, and in the long-term, the government aims to set the cap of skilled immigration to about 160,000.

In 2023, according to the Department of Education of the Australian Government, New South Wales, Victoria and Queensland are the states attracting the largest portion of international students.

== Definitions ==
In Australia, a student is considered an international student if they are not an Australian citizen, Australian permanent resident, New Zealand citizen, or a holder of an Australian Permanent resident humanitarian visa.

== Classification ==
=== By destinations ===
==== Popular destinations ====
The top 3 states in Australia for foreign enrolment in 2018 are listed below.

Top 3 states in Australia for foreign enrolment in 2018
Rank	Destination States	Number of Students	Per cent of Total
1	NSW / New South Wales	333,913	38.39%
2	VIC / Victoria	278,975	32.08%
3	QLD / Queensland	134,312	15.44%

==== Distribution of International Students in major cities and regional areas ====
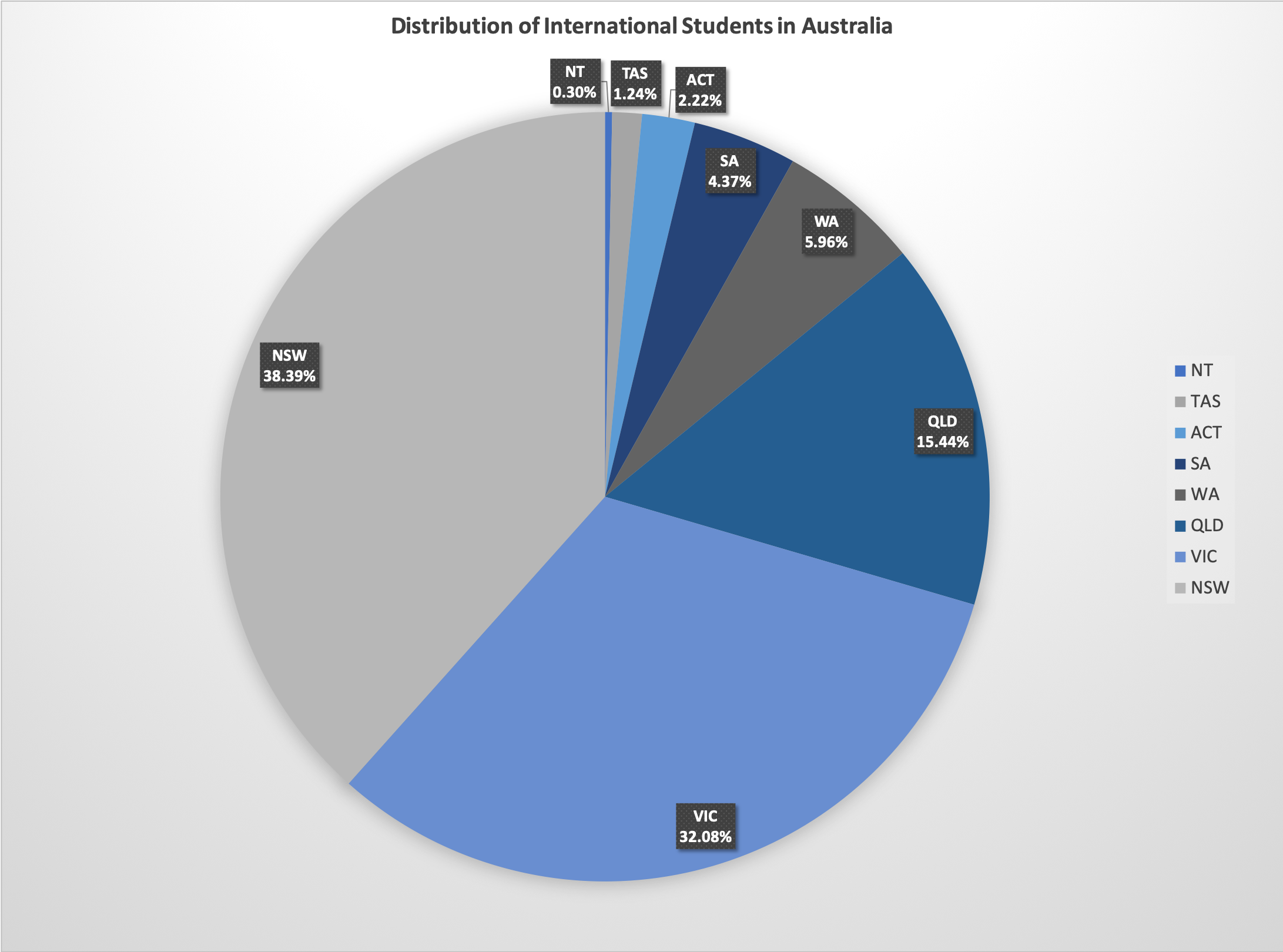
Distribution of International Students in Australia in 2018

In 2018, 3% of international students enrolled in Australia stayed in regional locations of Australia, while 97% of international students chose to settle down in major cities. All enrolments in Tasmania and the Northern Territory are considered as enrolled in regional areas.

New South Wales had the largest number of international students, up to 333,913. Queensland had the largest regional area proportion (5%), followed by New South Wales (1%) and Victoria (1%).

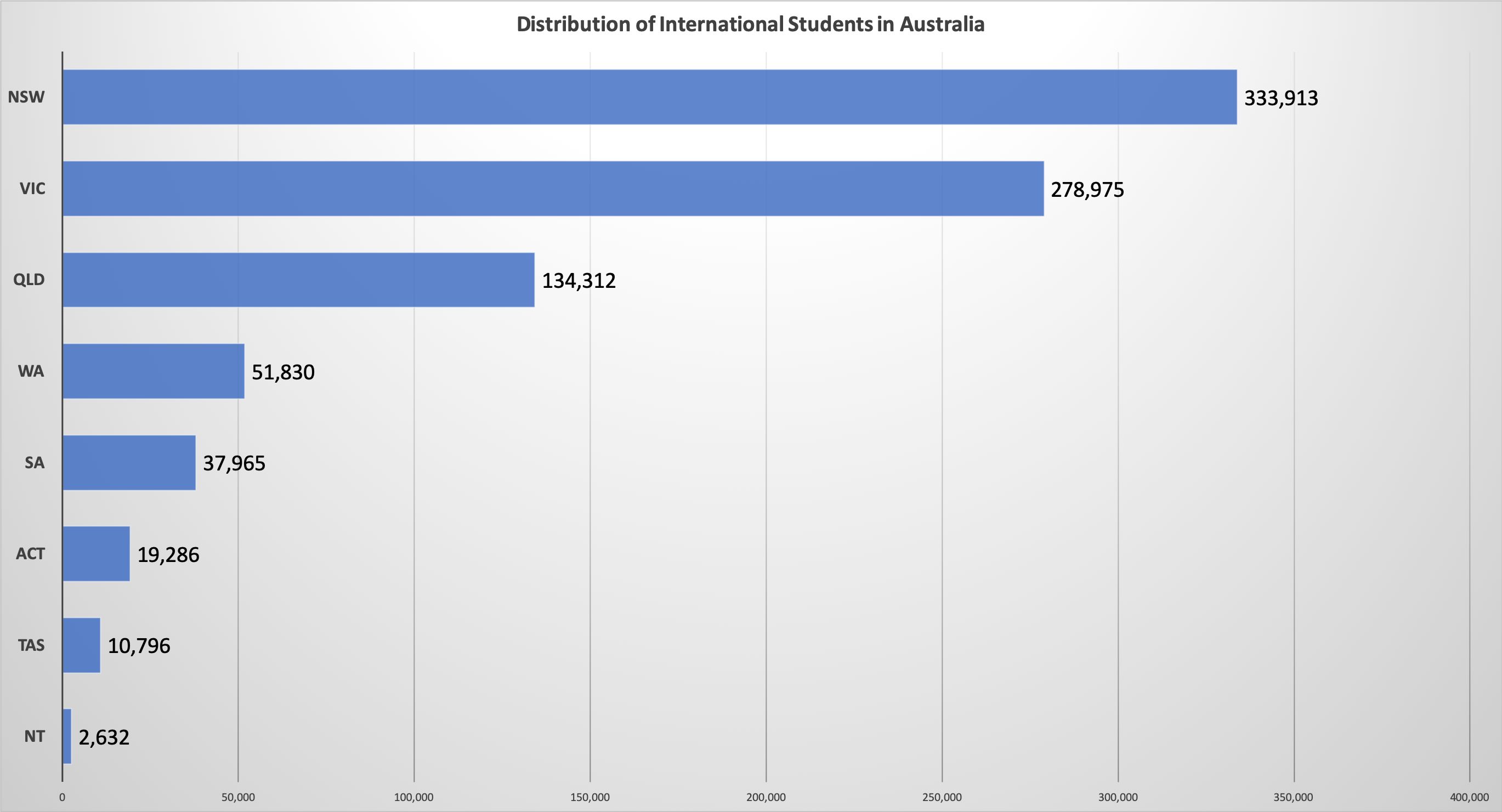
Distribution of International Students in Australia in 2018

China was the main source country for enrolments, which contributed 24% of regional area enrolments. Nepal (7%) had the second large proportion of the regional area enrolments, followed by Malaysia, South Korea and the US, all of which are contributed three per cent to total regional enrolments.

Distribution of international student enrolments in Australian capital and regional areas in 2018
State / Territory	Share		Enrolments		Total
State / Territory	Major cities	Regional area	Major cities	Regional area	Total
NSW	99%	1%	330,224	3,689	333,913
VIC	99%	1%	276,733	2,242	278,975
QLD	95%	5%	127,260	7,052	134,312
WA	100%	0%	51,597	233	51,830
SA	100%	0%	37,870	95	37,965
ACT	100%	0%	19,286	-	19,286
TAS	-	100%	-	10,796	10,796
NT	-	100%	-	2,632	2,632
Australia (Total)	97%	3%	842,970	26,739	869,709

Top 10 regional centers for international student enrolments in 2018 are listed below.

Regional centers for international student enrolments in 2018
State / Territory	Regional centres	2017	2018	Share	Growth in 2017
TAS	Hobart	6,862	9,391	35%	37%
NT	Darwin	2,462	2,625	10%	7%
QLD	Cairns	2,675	2,475	9%	-7%
QLD	Toowoomba	2,064	2,038	8%	-1%
QLD	Townsville	1,942	1,860	7%	-4%
NSW	Richmond - Tweed	1,442	1,554	6%	8%
NSW	New England and North West	1,350	1,427	5%	6%
TAS	Launceston and North East	1,381	1,389	5%	1%
VIC	Ballarat	1,001	1,199	4%	20%
VIC	Geelong	418	323	1%	-23%
Other Locations		2,612	2,458	9%	-6%
Total enrolments in regional areas		24,209	26,739	100%	10%

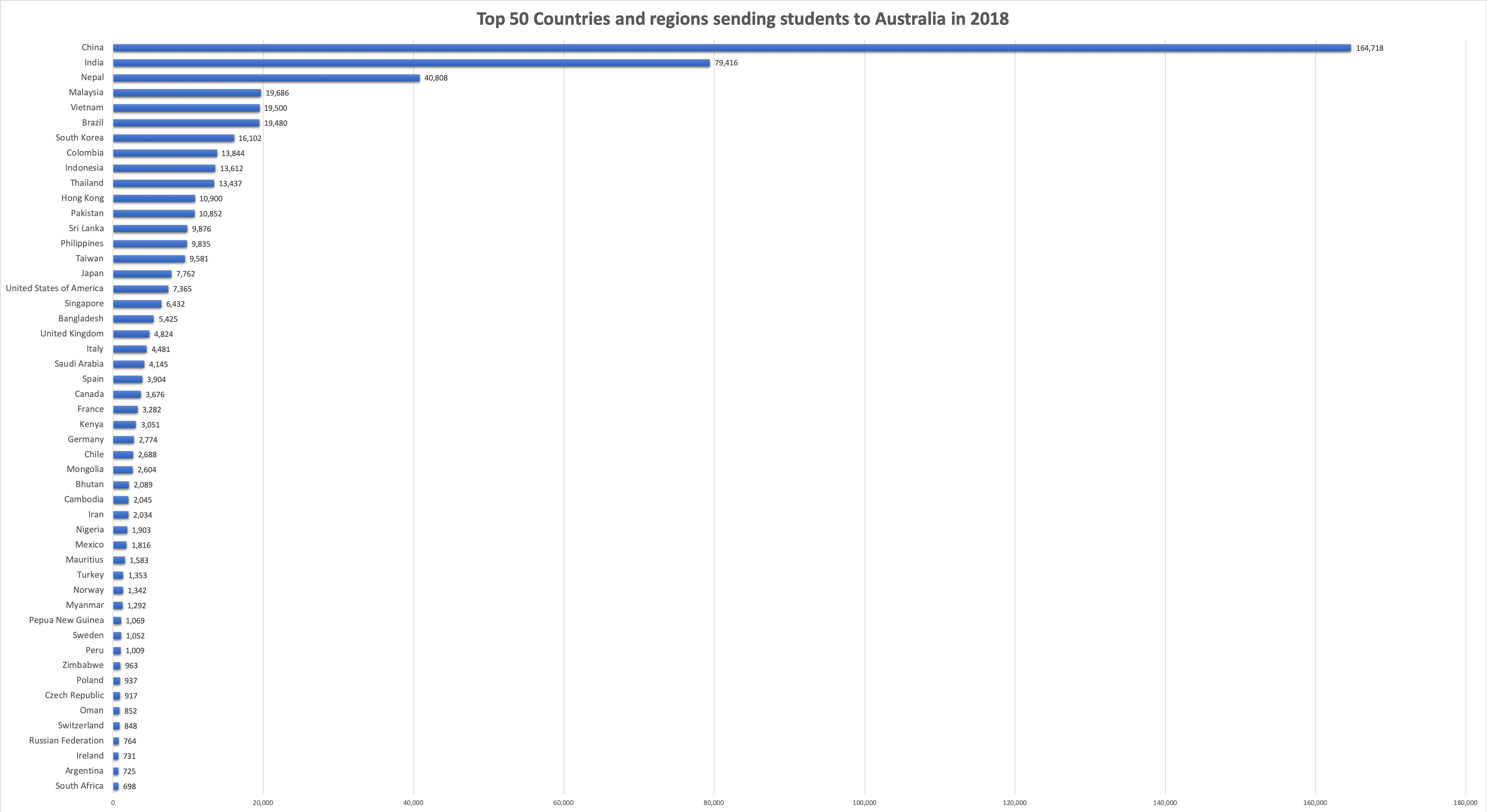
Top 50 Countries and Regions sending students to Australia in 2018

=== By sending countries and regions ===
Top 20 countries and regions sending students to Australia in 2023 are listed below.

January- July 2023
Rank	Country	Number of Students	Per cent of total
1	China	152,395	21%
2	India	118,869	17%
3	Nepal	59,147	8%
4	Colombia	33,494	5%
5	Philippines	29,916	4%
6	Vietnam	27,764	4%
7	Thailand	24,241	3%
8	Pakistan	22,054	3%
9	Brazil	21,260	3%
10	Indonesia	19,166	3%
11	Malaysia	15,707	2%
12	Sri Lanka	14,968	2%
13	Hong Kong	13,207	2%
14	South Korea	12,278	4%
15	Bangladesh	10,537	1%
16	Bhutan	9,640	1%
17	Japan	9,624	1%
18	Taiwan	8,728	1%
19	Kenya	6,866	1%
20	Singapore	6,402	
Total		616,263	86%
(Total out of 710,893 students in Australia during January to July in 2023)

== Requirements ==
=== Student visa ===
Generally, international students as citizens of other countries are required to obtain a valid student visa, which ascertains their legal status for staying in Australia. Students who have obtained the Student Visa (subclass 500) can stay in Australia for up to 5 years, depending on their enrolment. Approximately, 400,000 overseas students are granted this visa each year. In Australia, when students apply for their visa, they need to get the Confirmation of Enrolment (CoE) for each course and submit it to the Department of Home Affairs of the Australian Government. Overseas Student Health Cover (OSHC) is compulsory for all overseas students. Each student visa applicant must prove that they have enough financial ability to pay for their tuition, books and daily living expenses while they study in Australia. Overseas students enrolled in an English Language Intensive Courses for Overseas Students (ELICOS, offered by secondary schools) with a student visa are required to study full time (tourist and visitors to Australia can also participate in ELICOS study during their stay).

Australia Student Visa (Subclass 500) Fees
Category	Fee (AUD)
Applicant	2,500
Spouse (Dependent)	1,225
Child (Dependent)	400

These fees are payable when you submit your student visa application for Australia (Subclass 500). The amounts can change, so always check the Australian Government Department of Home Affairs for the latest updates.

Overseas student visa grants, 1996–97 to 2014-15
Year	Overseas students
1996-97	113,000
1997-98	108,827
1998-99	110,894
1999-00	119,806
2000-01	146,577
2001-02	151,894
2002-03	162,575
2003-04	171,616
2004-05	174,786
2005-06	190,674
2006-07	230,807
2007-08	278,715
2008-09	319,632
2009-10	270,499
2010-11	250,438
2011-12	253,046
2012-13	259,278
2013-14	292,060
2014-15	299,540

On 1 July 2016, after a new Simplified Student Visa Framework (SSVF) was implemented in Australia, the Department of Home Affairs of Australian Government introduced a new immigration risk framework to determine the amount of documents a student needs to submit with their application form, based on their country of citizenship and intended education provider.

According to the new released Simplified Student Visa Framework (SSVF), foreign students are able to provide a Confirmation of Enrolment (CoE) to meet the English language requirements for their student visa application. The Confirmation of Enrolment (CoE) is a piece of evidence to prove that the English language requirements for their course are equal to or higher than the requirements for a student visa. However, those foreign students who assessed at a higher immigration risk level will still need to attend an English language test and to provide evidence of their English language proficiency through one of the English tests accepted by Australia with an approved test score.

=== English language proficiency requirements ===
International students who apply to study in Australia will need to meet English language proficiency requirements to obtain a valid student visa. Students must have taken the English language test in the last two years before they apply for a students visa, or the validity will expire.

==== English language proficiency evidence exemptions ====
All international students will need to meet the English language proficiency requirements to gain entry into their course and receive a student visa.

Some international students are exempt from providing evidence of English language proficiency with their visa application if they satisfy one or more of the following requirements:

- Students who are a citizen and passport holder of UK, USA, Canada, New Zealand or Ireland.
- An applicant who is a Foreign Affairs or, Defence sponsored student or a Secondary Exchange Student (AASES).
- Students who have completed at least five years of study in one or more of the following countries: Australia, UK, USA, Canada, New Zealand, South Africa, or Ireland.
- In last two years of applying for a student visa, students who have completed either the Senior Secondary Certificate of Education or a course leading to a qualification from the Australian Qualifications Framework at the Certificate IV or higher level in Australia.
- Students enrolled full time in school studies as a principal course (including secondary exchange programs), a registered postgraduate research or a standalone English Language Intensive Courses for Overseas Students (ELICOS) program

All other students are required to provide evidence of English language proficiency (with a Confirmation of Enrolment(CoE) or a minimum ielts score for australia student visa).

==== Types of English Language Proficiency tests accepted in Australia ====
There are five types of English language proficiency (ELP) tests accepted for student visa applications in Australia:

- International English Language Testing System (IELTS)
- Test of English as a Foreign Language (TOEFL) *internet-based test (paper-based test is also accepted)
- Cambridge English: Advanced (CAE)
- Pearson Test of English Academic (PTE Academic)
- Occupational English Test (OET)

==== Minimum English language proficiency test score required ====
The requirements for English language proficiency tests scores will vary depending on the institution they choose, their country of citizenship and whether they are preparing to enrol in an English Language Intensive Courses for Overseas Students (ELICOS) course.

For student visa applicants, the minimum scores accepted for each test are listed in the table below.

for the international students who do not meet the English language test requirement, they are suggested to complete an English Language Intensive Courses for Overseas Students (ELICOS) to improve their English language skills.

Minimum scores to meet the Student visa English language requirement
English language test providers	Minimum score	Minimum score and at least 10 weeks ELICOS (English Language Intensive Courses for Overseas Students)	Minimum score and at least 20 weeks ELICOS
International English Language Testing System (IELTS)	5.5	5.0	4.5
Test of English as a Foreign Language (TOEFL)	46	35	32
Cambridge English: Advanced (Certificate in Advanced English /CAE)	162	154	147
Pearson Test of English Academic (PTE Academic)	42	36	30
Occupational English Test (OET)	B for each test component / Pass (A orB)	Pass (A orB)	Pass (A orB)

However, even though the government have provided the minimum English language proficiency tests scores required for student visa application, foreign students may still need to get a higher score to get enrolled into their desire institution and courses. Some specific courses, such as law, education, medical programs, are likely to have a higher requirement, while the requirements for an English Language Intensive Courses for Overseas Students (ELICOS) and Vocational Education and Training (VET) courses are usually lower.

== Impact on Australia's economy ==
According to the survey prepared by Deloitte Access Economics and the Australian government, international education was predicted to contribute about seventeen billion to Australia's GDP in a 2014-15 financial year. This value is the sum of:

- Twelve billion of direct value which is the paid tuition fee to the education providers and the learning materials and services which sold to the students
- Five billion of indirect value, which is the payment of the education providers to their suppliers, for example, printing and information technology support services.

Apart from that, international students make a substantial contribution to the development of many regional areas as there is at least five per cent of students living and studying in those communities. In 2014–15, the international student spent about 3 billion of expenditure (for purchasing goods and services) to Melbourne while 900 million indirect value flowed to regional communities and massively supported the agricultural products and other linkages. Finally, the consequence of student consumption supported approximately 12,746 jobs in regional Victoria.

Furthermore, in 2014–2015, The stocks of international students were estimated to deliver about 130,000 skilled migrants after the graduation year. This number of skilled migrants had increased 3% of Australia's current workforce with tertiary education. In the financial year of 2018, international students inject $31.9 billion into the Australian economy, directly boosting Australian jobs and wages, generating jobs, supporting wages, and lifting the living standards of Australia.

International students inject almost $32 billion into Australia's economy each year and support 130,000 Australian jobs. They also bring Australia and the world closer together, and built important diplomatic and personal ties.

According to the warning by NSW auditors, Australian universities is now suffering from a "market concentration risk" since their finance and budget rely too much on foreign student fees. As the report shows, in the New South Wales, the international students tuition fees injects $2.8 billion AUD into universities, which accounts for 28% of the total revenue. The University of Sydney and the University of New South Wales, two universities in NSW, accounted for more than 50% of their total revenue from international students' tuition fees.

== Controversies ==
In recent years, the increasing number of international students in Australia has raised several concerns. One major issue pertains to changes in Australia's international student intake policy and the discrimination based on the economic status of their home countries. Critics argue that Australia discriminates against citizens from certain countries, alleging that these citizens come from nations with lower economic opportunities compared to Australia.

Another significant concern is the rising safety issues faced by international students. Despite Australia's status as a developed country, reports indicate that many international students experience mental health challenges, and the country lacks adequate preventive and support systems to address these issues. A 2019 report revealed that rising educational and financial pressures, isolation, homesickness, and difficulties in accessing mental health support have led to an increase in suicides among international students. Scholars also express apprehension about the ability of international students to actively engage in English-based systems within Australia. For many international students, English is not their first language, and they may struggle with it. Factors such as social isolation due to language barriers, racial and cultural differences, and other challenges increasingly hinder their ability to improve their English language skills. Recent research highlights that international students who struggle to navigate the available supports in Australia, are increasingly turning to generative artificial intelligence technologies for support, which may compound their vulnerabilities. As reliance on digital technologies for managing wellbeing is unevenly shaped by privilege, financial resources, and temporal flexibility, this raises new questions about the implications of international students' digital dependence for data justice.

=== Extension of 2019–20 Hong Kong protests into universities campus ===
Since March 2019, there has been a number of protests owing to the 2019 Hong Kong extradition bill. Some students from Hong Kong would like to support the protest in Hong Kong, but some of them said that they felt being monitored by the mainland students, and were provoked by the students from mainland China even if the Hong Kong students were solely expressing their opinion peacefully. On 24 July 2019, there was a supporting protest at the Great Court of Queensland University (UQ) initiated by Drew Pavlou, a student representative to UQ's senate. The protest was echoed by some students from Hong Kong. They urged for the acceptance of the five requests in Hong Kong (Complete withdrawal of the bill, Withdrawal determining the protests as "riots", cancellation of Political prosecution on the protesters, independent investigation on the violence of the police and the implementation of real universal suffrage), urging for the closure of the Confucius Institute at the Queensland University, shutting down the Xinjiang re-education camps. Nevertheless, the protest was developed into a conflict. Some students from mainland China (The Consulate-General of PRC in Brisbane claimed that also included students from Hong Kong, but it was not proven by other media) initiated anti-separation and anti Hong Kong independence protests. Some mainland destroyed the Lennon Wall and poster established by the Hong Kong students, and openly sang the Chinese National Song. Pavlou was attacked by the Chinese student and was injured.

PRC Consul-General in Brisbane responded by confirming the patriotic act of the mainland students and condemning the "anti-Chinese" activities initiated by the Hong Kong students. In October 2019, Pavlou has sought a court order similar to a restraining order against the Chinese Consul-General in Brisbane, Xu Jie.

== Immigration policy for international students ==
Most international students who come to study in Australia wish to reside here permanently. The student-migration nexus in Australia is complex and is constantly evolving.

The current immigration policy published by Australian government encourages foreign students to work and stay in regional areas, such as Adelaide and Tasmania, by reducing the quota of skilled independent visa entrants (change from subclass 175 and subclass 885 to subclass 189), and in the meantime increasing the number of skilled regional (provisional) visa (change from subclass 457 to 489).

Regional Areas in Australia and Low population growth metropolitan areas
States	Areas	Postcode
New South Wales	Everywhere except Sydney, Newcastle, the Central Coast and Wollongong	2311 to 2312, 2328 to 2411, 2410 to 2490, 2536 to 2551, 2575 to 2594, 2618 to 2739, 2787 to 2898
Northern Territory	Everywhere in the territory	All postcodes
Queensland	Everywhere except the greater Brisbane area and the Gold Coast	4124 to 4125, 4133, 4211, 4270 to 4272, 4275, 4280, 4285, 4287, 4307 to 4499, 4515, 4517 to 4519, 4522 to 4899
South Australia	Everywhere in the state	All postcodes
Tasmania	Everywhere in the state	All postcodes
Victoria	Everywhere except the Melbourne metropolitan area	3211 to 3334, 3340 to 3424, 3430 to 3649, 3658 to 3749, 3753, 3756, 3758, 3762, 3764, 3778 to 3781, 3783, 3797, 3799, 3810 to 3909, 3921 to 3925, 3945 to 3974, 3979, 3981 to 3996
Western Australia	Everywhere except Perth and surrounding areas	6041 to 6044, 6083 to 6084, 6121 to 6126, 6200 to 6799
*For use when applying for skilled visas: Skilled Independent visa (subclass 189); Skilled Nominated visa (subclass 190); Skilled Regional (Provisional) visa (subclass 489) - State and territory nominated applicants via the Invited pathway; Skilled Regional (Residence) visa (subclass 887)

In 2017, the government accepted about 162,000 migrants, which was about 10% lower than the accepted amount in 2016. The long-term forecast of the Australian Government aims to set the cap of skilled immigrants to about 160,000.

Some educational institutions in Australia offering courses primarily to international students have been accused of being ghost colleges. These institutions primarily serve to facilitate migration, and provide little or no legitimate educational offerings.
