= Laura Callahan =

American civil servant

Laura Callahan (née Laura L. Crabtree) was a U.S. career civil servant. Callahan was a senior information technology (IT) manager at the White House before becoming deputy chief information officer (CIO) of the United States Department of Labor and senior director at the United States Department of Homeland Security. She resigned from the latter position after an investigation reported that she had obtained academic degrees from a diploma mill.

== White House IT manager ==
During an examination of alleged campaign finance irregularities of the 1996 presidential campaign during the Clinton administration, investigators discovered that a computer glitch had caused the White House's automated record management system (ARMS) to improperly scan, log, and archive incoming, external e-mails to almost 500 White House staff members. As a result, these emails were not turned over in response to a congressional subpoena. (The White House did turn over more than 7,000 emails in response to subpoenas in the inquiry). The problem was discovered in June 1998, and was initially reported to Callahan, who at the time was the Desktop System Branch Chief for the Information Systems division of the White House Office of Administration. According to the Congressional Report, Callahan allegedly told the employee who reported the problem that Mark Lindsay (the general counsel of OA) directed that, "if you or any of your staff tell anyone, especially, Steve Hawkins or Jim Wright, about the problem, you will lose your jobs, be arrested and go to jail." In October 1998 Callahan was removed from her office. No official reason was given, but in testimony to Congress, her superior cited reasons including that "Callahan went outside the chain-of-command in directing the Northrop Grumman (IT) employees", that "Callahan was exercising authority over staff members not in her charge," and that the superior "most certainly" credited as true the employee's account that they were threatened.

In March 2000, Callahan was called to testify before Congress regarding her role as White House IT manager. Three Northrop Grumman contract workers responsible for operating the system testified that the problem was technical in nature, but that White House staff members Callahan and Mark Lindsay (an assistant to the president and director of White House management and administration) instructed them "to remain quiet on the issue while the problem was diagnosed and repaired," and threatened them with jail if they disclosed the problem. The House report recommended that special counsel was needed to investigate obstruction of justice and perjury charges against people including Callahan.

The Final Report of the Independent Counsel to the Court filed in 2001, however, concluded "no witness reported that they were told to lie to investigators or felt they were prevented from reporting matters to the appropriate law enforcement officials," and the contractors did not allege that the problem "actually caused by the White House, nor did the White House tell them to destroy any e-mails." The contractors did testify that the staffers threatened them with being fired or arrested if they spoke about the problem. Callahan and Lindsay "vehemently denied" threatening the contractors, and stated that their instructions to limit "water cooler talk" while the team was in a "diagnostic mode" were standard procedure.

The Final Report of the Independent Counsel "found no substantial evidence that senior White House officials unlawfully prevented Northrop Grumman employees from providing information in any criminal investigation" and further concluded:

The allegations that witnesses were threatened to prevent disclosure to this or other investigations were unsubstantiated. Furthermore, given that there was no substantial evidence that electronic records had been intentionally withheld and that this Office's review to date of electronic records that had previously not been produced had provided no evidence that would alter any previous conclusion in any other matters, the Independent Counsel concluded that the discovery of further probative evidence was unlikely and that further investigation was, therefore, unwarranted.

== Department of Labor ==
Callahan left the White House in October 1999 and subsequently was appointed Deputy CIO of the United States Department of Labor, where she was responsible for overseeing the Department's $420 million IT budget. She was elected President of the Association for Federal Information Resources Management (AFFIRM), a professional organization representing federal information technology managers.

Some Department of Labor employees later interviewed by the media said that Callahan was difficult to work for and was known for "belittling and even firing subordinates who did not understand the technical jargon she apparently picked up while studying for her doctorate in computer information systems." A 2001 report issued by Assistant Inspector General John J. Getek cited "allegations of waste, mismanagement, fraud and abuse" against Callahan's office and faulted her management practices for fostering "low morale" among her staff of 125. Callahan was, however, promoted twice by the agency, and in 2002 became the Department's IT Director.

== Department of Homeland Security ==
In April 2003, she was named to the position of Deputy CIO of the Department of Homeland Security.

In May 2003 Callahan was reported to have obtained all three degrees on her government resume—her bachelor's, master's, and doctoral degrees—from Hamilton University, a diploma mill in Wyoming. Furthermore, she allegedly paid to have all three degrees backdated to 1993, 1995, and 2000, respectively. Callahan was placed on paid administrative leave in June 2003, but continued to draw a six-figure DHS salary until her resignation on March 26, 2004. She was never charged with a crime.
