= Herguan University =

University in California, US

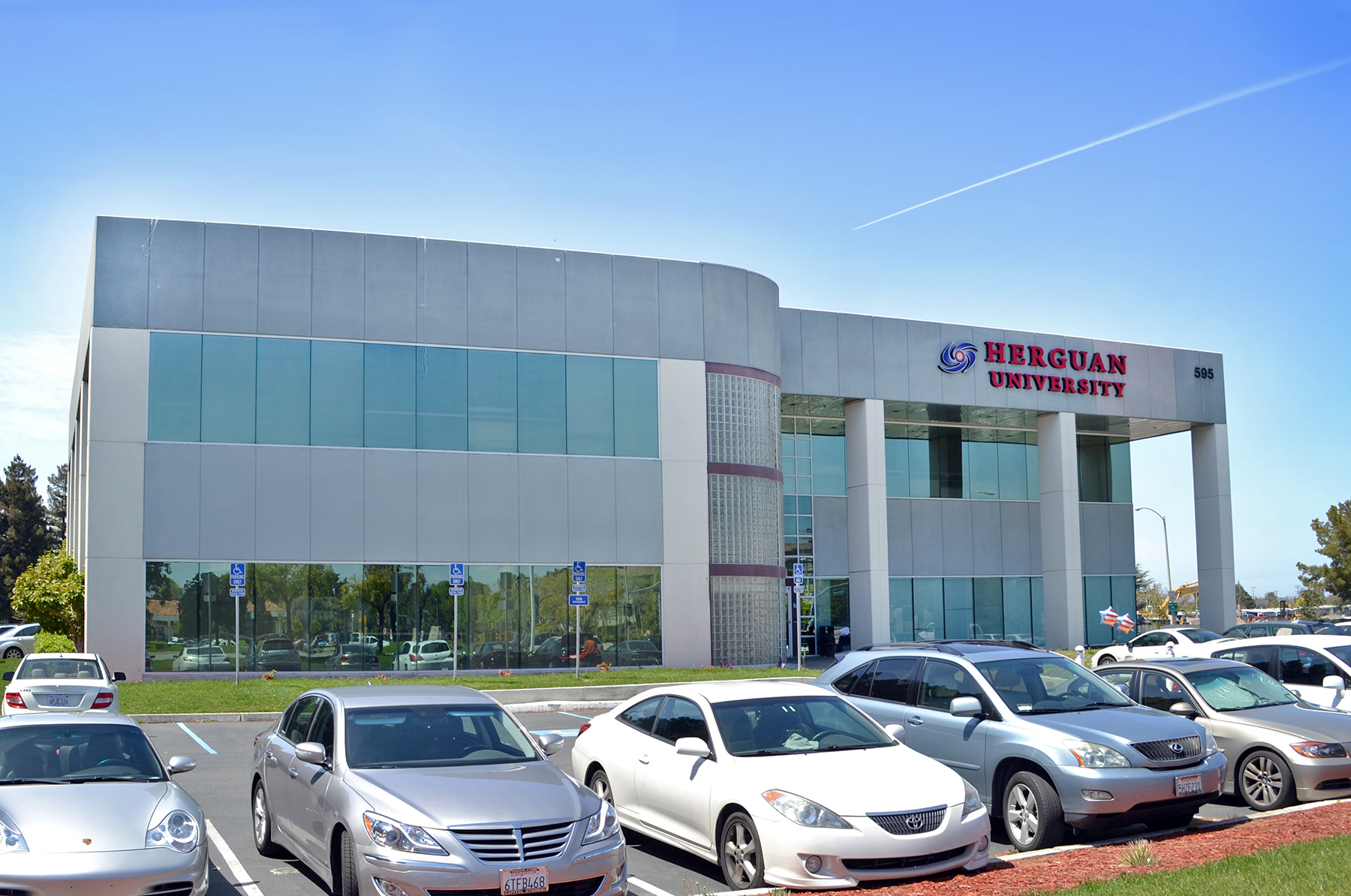
- Herguan University campus
- Type: Private/unaccredited
- Active: 2008–2019
- President: Ying Qiu Wang
- Location: Sunnyvale, California, United States; 37.38648°N 121.99691°W
- Nickname: HGU

Herguan University was a private, unaccredited, university and alleged visa mill in Sunnyvale, California operated by Ying Qiu Wang. As of 2019, its domain names herguanuniversity.edu and herguanuniversity.org appear to be abandoned.

Ying Qiu Wang also founded the University of East-West Medicine (UEWM), which according to its website was founded in 1997 and operates where Herguan University was located.

== Accreditation status ==
Herguan University is unaccredited.

Herguan University was formerly accredited by ACICS. ACICS lost its status as recognized accreditor on December 12, 2016. ACICS revoked Herguan University's accreditation on Sept. 12, 2017.

At one time, Herguan University was on the Oregon Office of Degree Authorization list of unaccredited colleges.

== Operating status ==
The University's MBA, MSCS, and MSEE programs operate with approval from the California Department of Consumer Affairs' Bureau for Private Postsecondary Education. The Bureau is not an accreditation agency and does not confer accreditation status to educational institutions.

On August 2, 2012, Immigration and Customs Enforcement (ICE) served Herguan with a notice of intent to withdraw its Student and Exchange Visitor Program (SEVP) certification. Herguan's CEO has been indicted on visa fraud charges.

On September 18, 2012, ICE revoked Herguan's SEVP approval, but rescinded that decision a day later. According to ICE, Herguan's lawyer had sent the response to a wrong email address. The San Jose Mercury News reported on evidence that Herguan officials tried to get help from local and state politicians regarding the ICE investigation.

On April 9, 2015, Herguan's former CEO, Jerry Wang, pleaded guilty to visa fraud. On April 10, 2015, ICE moved to revoke Herguan's SEVP approval.

On September 14, 2015, Herguan's former CEO, Jerry Wang, was sentenced to 12 months in prison and forfeiture of $700K for his role in a student visa fraud scheme at Herguan.

On October 6, 2016, US Immigration and Customs Enforcement (ICE) revoked Herguan's SEVP approval, terminating their ability to enroll foreign students.

== Enrollments ==
The enrollment practices of Herguan have been compared to Tri-Valley University, whose founder had previously worked as an adjunct faculty member at Herguan. The Chronicle of Higher Education claims Herguan targets international students looking for full-time or part-time internships. The enrollment as of August 2012 is around 450 people, of which 400 are from India.

== Other practices ==
Herguan obtained government approval to admit foreign students based on an application that included letters purporting to be from accredited colleges stating that they would accept credits from Herguan for transfer students. However, the letters were disclaimed by those colleges. An official at another college stated that Herguan staff offered payments in exchange for recognition. However, as recently as late 2010, most of Herguan's students were employed outside of California in full-time jobs, an apparent violation of the condition of their visas requiring them to be full-time students taking no more than one on-line class each term. This practice may have been curtailed in December 2010 when Herguan's president sent letters to all students requiring them to return to California. The president, however, backtracked later, and offered students $500 to return for classes for six days.

Several Herguan staff claimed that otherwise failing students had been able to buy passing grades by paying more money to the school. Prospective students have claimed students get paid $1200 for each student who they refer to the school. The school also maintained "educational consultants" who were paid for students they referred, most of whom were based in Hyderabad, India.
