= Tri-Valley University =

Unaccredited university in California, US

- Type: Unaccredited private university
- Active: 2008–2011
- President: Susan Xiao-Ping Su
- Location: Pleasanton, California, United States; 37.67199°N 121.86372°W
- Website: www.trivalleyuniversity.org

Tri-Valley University (TVU) was an unaccredited private university in Pleasanton, California. It was shut down after being raided by Immigration and Customs Enforcement due to possible visa fraud.

== Legal problems ==
The institution was investigated by the United States Immigration and Customs Enforcement (ICE) department for allegedly operating as a front for illegal immigration. The ICE claims the school issued F-1 visas to students who lived outside California. From May 2009 to May 2010, the school went from having 11 students with F1 visas to 939 students with F1 visas. The number went to 1555 in December 2010. 89 percent of the students were from India. Students paid up to $2,700 per semester for tuition. Furthermore, the Department of Homeland Security claims students who were enrolled were paid if they referred another student to the school. Susan Su, operator of the school specifically blamed two student workers, one of whom runs a consulting company, for operating the visa fraud scheme. The school was shut down after a raid by ICE on January 19, 2011. The US Attorney filed suit to forfeit five properties owned by Susan Su relating to the school.

Foreign students, mostly from India, were interrogated by the ICE. Some were radio-tagged to monitor their movements, a move the Indian government protested as treating the students who had been tricked by TVU's promoters like common criminals. ICE set up a web page for former TVU students, instructing them to call SEVP to discuss the students' options.

In March 2011, The Chronicle of Higher Education published an investigation into the practices of TVU and other American for-profit higher education institutions that are virtually unknown within the United States, lack accreditation, and specialize in enrolling foreign students.

On May 2, 2011, TVU's founder and owner, Susan Su, was arrested on indictments by a federal grand jury on 33 counts. Later that year, four students who worked in campus jobs offered by the TVU president were charged in relation to the same case.

On July 11, 2014, one student was sentenced to 30 days' probation, another to one day's probation, another to six months' probation and a $2,000 fine, and the fourth student to three years' probation with 200 hours of community service. About three months later, Su was sentenced to 16 years in prison, forfeiture of $5.6 million, and over $900,000 in restitution.

While the case against Su was pending, she was listed as president of a new unaccredited university called Global TV University, based in the same office complex where TVU was located. The state's attorney general denied the application for a new university at that site, citing, among other issues, the use of a proxy in the application.

On March 24, 2014, Su was found guilty on 31 counts in the federal case against her. Prosecutors said Su netted $5.9 million through mail fraud, visa fraud and money laundering, and used the money to buy luxury cars and real estate. Su's appeal to the United States Court of Appeals for the 9th Circuit was denied, as were her appeals to the US Supreme Court.

== Accreditation ==
The university started operating in 2008. It was able to operate under a religious exemption from California Bureau for Private Postsecondary and Vocational Education. However, that ended in 2010 when California Bureau for Private Postsecondary Education handled these issues. The university did file for a religious exemption but the request was denied. As a result, the school could no longer accept new students starting in January 2010. The school was certified by Department of Homeland Security to offer F1 Visas. One rule to qualify for issuing student visas is that the school's credits be accepted by three different established universities. However, a review of the affidavits' files found two of the schools did not accept credits offered by the university; this led authorities to begin inquiries. Several students were interrogated throughout the investigation.

== See also ==
- Diploma mill
- Herguan University – Raided by ICE on August 3, 2012 for similar reasons. Susan Su taught here before starting Tri-Valley.
- List of unaccredited institutions of higher education
- List of unrecognized higher education accreditation organizations
- University of Northern Virginia – Raided by ICE on July 28, 2011 for similar reasons
