= Heinz Meier (actor) =

- Born: February 17, 1930
- Died: July 21, 2013 (aged 83)
- Occupations: Actor and theatre director

Heinz Meier (February 17, 1930 - July 21, 2013) was a German actor and theatre director. He was most famous for his appearances in many sketches of popular German comedian Loriot, where he was one of the most common actors alongside Loriot himself and Evelyn Hamann. He also appeared in his two films Ödipussi and Pappa Ante Portas, but only in minor roles.

== Selected filmography ==
- Guernica – Jede Stunde verletzt und die letzte tötet (1965, TV Movie, dir. Peter Lilienthal) as Fanchou
- Seraphine oder Die wundersame Geschichte der Tante Flora (1965, TV Movie, dir. Peter Lilienthal) as Daniel
- Große Liebe (1966, TV Movie, dir. Johannes Schaaf) as Hartmut Stiehl
- Tattoo (1967, dir. Johannes Schaaf) as Siggi
- Lebeck (1968, TV Movie, dir. Johannes Schaaf) as Lebeck
- Versetzung (1968, TV Movie, dir. Tom Toelle) as Hagen
- Die Klasse (1968, TV Movie, dir. Wolfgang Staudte) as Blau, Teacher
- Heimlichkeiten (1968, dir. Wolfgang Staudte) as Lothar Kunze
- Your Caresses (1969, dir. Peter Schamoni, Herbert Vesely) as Uncle
- Die Kriminalnovelle (1970, TV Mini-Series, dir. Wolfgang Staudte) as Mr. Wellman
- The Weavers (1971, TV Movie, dir. Günter Gräwert) as Pfeifer
- Ein Fall für Herrn Schmidt (1971, TV Movie, dir. Falk Harnack) as Warnke
- Eight Hours Don't Make a Day (1972, TV Series, dir. Rainer Werner Fassbinder) as Meier
- World on a Wire (1973, TV Movie, dir. Rainer Werner Fassbinder) as Secretary of State von Weinlaub
- Zündschnüre (1974, TV Movie, dir. Reinhard Hauff) as Saremba
- By Hook or by Crook (1975, dir. Hartmut Bitomsky) as Teschau
- Der Lottogewinner (1976, TV Short, dir. Loriot) as Erwin Lindemann
- Iron Gustav (1979, TV series, dir. Wolfgang Staudte) as Herr Tümmel
- Die Jungfernfahrt der "Antje B." (1980, dir. Eberhard Pieper) as Alfred Bertoleit
- Who's Crazy, Doc? (1982, dir. Stefan Lukschy, Christian Rateuke) as Friseur
- Der Polenweiher (1986, dir. Nico Hofmann) as Polizist
- The Case of Mr. Spalt (1988, dir. René Perraudin) as Prof. Pruefspitz
- Ödipussi (1988, dir. Loriot) as Müller
- Pappa Ante Portas (1991, dir. Loriot) as Director
- Wir Enkelkinder (1992, dir. Bruno Jonas) as Vater Radunski
- Mrs. Rettich, Czerni and I (1998, dir. Markus Imboden) as Wirt Willi Burger
- Goebbels und Geduldig (2001, dir. Kai Wessel)
- Dinosaurier – Gegen uns seht ihr alt aus! (2009, dir. Leander Haußmann) as Bertram Kubitschek
- The Pasta Detectives (2014, dir. Neele Vollmar) as Old Man (final film role)
