= Unsere Besten =

German television program

Unsere Besten ("Our Best") is a television series shown on German public television (ZDF) in November 2003, similar to the BBC series 100 Greatest Britons and that program's spin-offs.

In subsequent years, a dozen similar rankings were compiled, mostly titled the "favourite (topic) of the Germans", with topics including books, places, songs, actors, comedians, sports persons (extra list for football players), inventions, and TV broadcasts (extra list for Olympic games).

== Greatest Germans ==
The intention initially was to find out "Who are the greatest Germans?" (Wer sind die größten Deutschen?), with more rankings to follow later. The German public was allowed to vote (via postcard, SMS or Internet) for the most important Germans—historical or contemporary—from a list of more than 300 people, plus additional suggestions.

This pre-determined list of candidates was created for two reasons:

1. to exclude controversial figures from certain eras of German history, like Adolf Hitler and Erich Honecker;
2. to decide beforehand who was to be considered as "German" in the first place, due to the complications of German history and its changing frontiers, which could have excluded such people as Mozart and Romy Schneider (Austria) or Albert Schweitzer (France).

However, the inclusion of Nikolaus Kopernikus, who spoke and wrote German, in the list of scientists caused controversy in Poland where he is revered as a national hero – the Polish Senate declared him an "exceptional Pole" on 12 June 2003. Similarly the inclusion of Mozart and Freud was criticized in Austria.

For the final Top Ten, an additional round was held, in which each candidate was promoted by an "ambassador" (most of them journalists) that would explain the work and importance of his or her favourite.

- Guido Knopp for Konrad Adenauer
- Margot Käßmann for Martin Luther
- Gregor Gysi for Karl Marx
- Alice Schwarzer for die Geschwister Scholl, Sophie and Hans Scholl
- Friedrich Nowottny for Willy Brandt
- Götz Alsmann for Johann Sebastian Bach
- Peter Sodann for Johann Wolfgang von Goethe
- Wolf von Lojewski for Johannes Gutenberg
- Helmut Markwort for Otto von Bismarck
- Nina Ruge for Albert Einstein

There was controversy over the televoting because of the high call charges associated with the programme.

The final list appeared as shown below (in descending order). Several rather unknown figures ranked relatively high, no doubt because of temporary popularity and organized votes from fan groups (#15), or in case of #125, just an entry by organized Internet forum members to honour one of their members.

== Top 10 ==
Rank	Personality	Notability	Nomination defended by
1	Konrad Adenauer	Chancellor, admired for making post-war West Germany a democratic nation again and a political and economical power.	Guido Knopp, journalist and author
2	Martin Luther	Priest, theologian and Protestant Reformer.	Margot Käßmann, theologian
3	Karl Marx	Writer, economist and philosopher. Founder of scientific socialism.	Gregor Gysi, politician
4	Sophie Scholl and Hans Scholl	Activists, members of the White Rose movement, an anti-Nazi resistance group during World War Two.	Alice Schwarzer, journalist
5	Willy Brandt	Chancellor, implemented the Ostpolitik and admired for his pacifist policies and official public apologies for Germany's war past. Received the Nobel Peace Prize in 1971.	Friedrich Nowottny, journalist
6	Johann Sebastian Bach	Composer. Creator of Mass in B Minor, Toccata and Fugue in D minor, BWV 565, Matthaus Passion, Johannes Passion and many other musical works which are still regarded as some of the greatest of all time.	Götz Alsmann, TV presenter and singer
7	Johann Wolfgang von Goethe	Poet, novelist and playwright, author of The Sorrows of Young Werther and Faust; widely admired as the most important and influential German-language author of all time.	Peter Sodann, actor, director and politician
8	Johannes Gutenberg	Printer. Inventor of the printing press.	Wolf von Lojewski, journalist
9	Otto von Bismarck	General and chancellor, admired for the unification of the German state.	Helmut Markwort, journalist.
10	Albert Einstein	Theoretical physicist, discovered the general theory of relativity and the law of the photoelectric effect. Hailed for his pacifist stance. Received the Nobel Prize in Physics in 1921.	Nina Ruge, journalist, TV presenter and novelist.

== 11–200 ==
11. Adolph Kolping, (1813–1865), priest and humanitarian activist. Provided social support for young workers. Beatified in 1991.
12. Ludwig van Beethoven, (1770–1827) composer (5th Symphony, 9th Symphony)
13. Helmut Kohl, (1930–2017) Chancellor (1982–1998). Played an important role in Germany's reunification in 1990.
14. Robert Bosch, (1861–1942) inventor, industrialist. Founded Robert Bosch GmbH.
15. Daniel Küblböck, (1985–2018) pop singer.
16. Konrad Zuse, (1910–1995) computer inventor. Invented the Z4, the first commercial computer.
17. Joseph Kentenich, (1885–1968) priest and theologian, founder of the Schoenstatt Movement.
18. Albert Schweitzer, (1875–1965) physician and philanthropist. Nourished the sick in Africa. Received the Nobel Peace Prize in 1952.
19. Karlheinz Böhm, (1928–2014) actor and charity activist.
20. Wolfgang Amadeus Mozart, (1756–1791) composer (Eine kleine Nachtmusik, The Magic Flute). Born in Salzburg, then Archbishopric of Salzburg, Holy Roman Empire. Today, Salzburg is located in Austria.
21. Helmut Schmidt, (1918–2015) Chancellor (1974–1982).
22. Regine Hildebrandt, (1941–2001) politician.
23. Alice Schwarzer, (1942–) feminist journalist. Founder of the journal EMMA.
24. Thomas Gottschalk, (1950–) radio and TV presenter (Wetten, dass..?)
25. Herbert Grönemeyer, (1956–) rock singer, actor and humanitarian activist.
26. Michael Schumacher, (1969–) racing driver.
27. Ludwig Erhard, (1897–1977) Chancellor (1963–1966). Led Germany's postwar economic reforms and thus mostly responsible for the Wirtschaftswunder.
28. Wilhelm Röntgen, (1845–1923) physicist. Discovered X-rays. Received the Nobel Prize in Physics in 1901.
29. Günther Jauch, (1956–) TV presenter and journalist.
30. Dieter Bohlen, (1954–) pop singer (Modern Talking), TV presenter and music producer
31. Jan Ullrich, (1973–) cyclist.
32. Steffi Graf, (1969–) tennis player.
33. Samuel Hahnemann, (1755–1843) physician. Developed homeopathy.
34. Dietrich Bonhoeffer, (1906–1945) theologian and Lutheran pastor. Co-founder of the Confessing Church. Resisted against Nazism, for which he was eventually executed.
35. Boris Becker, (1967–) tennis player.
36. Franz Beckenbauer, (1945–2024) football player, coach and organiser.
37. Oskar Schindler, (1908–1974) industrialist, saviour of 1200 Jews, subject of the novel Schindler's Ark and the film Schindler's List
38. Nena, (1960–) pop singer (99 Luftballons).
39. Hans-Dietrich Genscher, (1927–2016) politician. Vice Chancellor (1974–1982) (1982–1992). Foreign Minister (1974–1982) (1982–1992). Minister of Interior (1969–1974).
40. Heinz Rühmann, (1902–1994) film actor (Die Feuerzangenbowle).
41. Harald Schmidt, (1957–) comedian, actor and TV presenter (Die Harald Schmidt Show, Harald Schmidt)
42. Frederick II of Prussia ("Frederick the Great") (1712–1786) king.
43. Immanuel Kant, (1724–1804) philosopher (Critique of Pure Reason)
44. Patrick Lindner, (1960–) singer and TV presenter.
45. Hartmut Engler, (1960–) singer (Pur)
46. Hildegard von Bingen, (1098–1174) nun, writer, poet, philosopher and composer (Ordo Virtutum, Scivias, Liber Divinorum Operum)
47. Heino, (1938–) pop singer.
48. Richard von Weizsäcker, (1920–2015) Federal President (1984–1994).
49. Claus Graf Schenk von Stauffenberg, (1907–1944) military officer and Anti-Hitler activist
50. Marlene Dietrich, (1901–1992) film actress and singer (Der Blaue Engel).
51. Robert Koch, (1843–1910) physician. Developed Koch's postulates of germ theory and isolated anthrax, tuberculosis and cholera. Received the Nobel Prize in Physiology or Medicine in 1905.
52. Joschka Fischer, (1948–) Foreign Minister (1998–2005) and Vice Chancellor (1998–2005).
53. Karl May, (1842–1912) novelist (Winnetou).
54. Vicco von Bülow, (1923–2011) comedian, cartoonist, film director, actor and writer (Ödipussi, Pappa Ante Portas, Loriot)
55. Albertus Magnus, (c.1200–1280) philosopher and theologian. Beatified in 1622. Canonized in 1931.
56. Rudi Völler, (1960–) association football player.
57. Heinz Erhardt, (1909–1979) comedian.
58. Roy Black, (1943–1991) singer and actor.
59. Heinz-Harald Frentzen, (1967–) racing driver.
60. Wolfgang Apel, (1951–2017) animal rights activist.
61. Alexander von Humboldt, (1769–1859) botanist and explorer.
62. Peter Kraus, (1939–) singer.
63. Wernher von Braun, (1912–1977) rocket scientist. Inventor of the V-2 rocket and Saturn V rockets.
64. Dirk Nowitzki, (1978–) basketball player
65. Campino, (1962–) singer (Die Toten Hosen)
66. Franz Josef Strauß, (1915–1988) politician. Federal Minister of Defence (1956–1962). Federal Minister of Finance (1966–1969). Federal Minister for Atomic Affairs (1955–1956).
67. Sebastian Kneipp, (1821–1883) physician. Developed the Kneipp method.
68. Friedrich Schiller, (1759–1805) novelist, poet, philosopher and playwright (William Tell, Wallenstein)
69. Richard Wagner, (1813–1883) composer (Der Ring des Nibelungen)
70. Katarina Witt, (1965–) figure skater.
71. Fritz Walter, (1920–2002) footballer, captain of 1954 world championship winners
72. Nicole, (1960–) pop singer (Ein bißchen Frieden)
73. Friedrich von Bodelschwingh, (1877–1962) theologian. Founder of the Bethel Institution.
74. Otto Lilienthal, (1848–1896) aviator and inventor. Invented the glider.
75. Marion Gräfin Dönhoff, (1909–2002) journalist.
76. Thomas Mann, (1875–1955) novelist (Buddenbrooks, Death in Venice). Received the Nobel Prize in Literature in 1929.
77. Hermann Hesse, (1877–1962) novelist (Steppenwolf, Siddhartha). Received the Nobel Prize in Literature in 1946.
78. Romy Schneider, (1938–1982) film actress (Sissi). Born in Vienna, Austria, Schneider had a German-French dual citizenship.
79. Sven Hannawald, (1974–) ski jumper.
80. Empress Elisabeth of Austria, (1837–1898) better known as "Sissi". Despite being Austrian-Hungarian empress, she was born in Munich, Germany.
81. Willy Millowitsch, (1909–1999) actor and comedian.
82. Gerhard Schröder, (1944–) Chancellor (1998–2005).
83. Joseph Beuys, (1921–1986) artist (How to Explain Pictures to a Dead Hare)
84. Friedrich Nietzsche, (1844–1900) philosopher (Also sprach Zarathustra)
85. Rudi Dutschke, (1940–1979) student leader and activist.
86. Karl Lehmann, (1936–2018) priest.
87. Beate Uhse, (1919–2001) erotica entrepreneur.
88. Trümmerfrauen ("rubble women"), nickname for women who rebuild bombed buildings after World War II.
89. Carl Friedrich Gauss, (1777–1855) mathematician and physicist (Disquisitiones Arithmeticae)
90. Helmut Rahn, (1929–2003) athlete (football), scorer of winning goal in 1954.
91. Albrecht Dürer, (1471–1528) painter and engraver (Apocalypse, Knight, Death and the Devil, Melencolia I).
92. Max Schmeling, (1905–2005) boxer.
93. Karl Benz, (1844–1929) business man and inventor. Invented the Benz Patent-Motorwagen, which was the first petroleum-based automobile.
94. Frederick II, (1194–1250) emperor (1220–1250).
95. Reinhard Mey, (1942–) pop singer.
96. Heinrich Heine, (1797–1856) poet, journalist and novelist (Germany. A Winter's Tale).
97. Georg Elser, (1903–1945) worker who tried to assassinate Hitler in 1939, but failed.
98. Konrad Duden, (1829–1911) linguist. Developed the German dictionary Duden.
99. James Last, (1929–2015) composer and band leader.
100. Uwe Seeler, (1936–2022) association football player.
101. Jenny de la Torre Castro, (1954–) physician and humanitarian activist for the homeless. Born in Nazca, Peru, de la Torre Castro had a Peruvian-German dual citizenship.
102. Erich Gutenberg, (1897–1984) economist
103. Emanuel Lasker, (1868–1941) chess champion.
104. Rudolf Steiner, (1861–1925) philosopher and social reformer (The Philosophy of Freedom). Born in Murakirály, Austria (nowadays located in Croatia) and thus technically born as an Austrian.
105. Edith Stein, (1891–1942) theologian. Executed in Auschwitz for being of Jewish descent. Beatified in 1987 and canonized in 1998.
106. Farin Urlaub, (1963–) musician (Die Ärzte)
107. Xavier Naidoo, (1971–) singer.
108. Nicolaus Copernicus, (1473–1543) astronomer and mathematician. Developed heliocentrism. Born in Toruń, which is located in Poland today.
109. Adam Ries, (1492–1559) mathematician.
110. Gottlieb Daimler, (1834–1900) business man and inventor. Invented the high-speed liquid petroleum fueled engine, which lead to the creation of the automobile.
111. Erich Kästner, (1899–1974) writer (Emil and the Detectives).
112. Rosa Luxemburg, (1871–1919) politician and activist.
113. Bertolt Brecht, (1898–1956) writer and playwright (The Threepenny Opera, Mother Courage and Her Children)
114. Theodor Heuss, (1884–1963) politician. President of the Federal Republic (1949–1959).
115. Otto I the Great, (912–973) king (936–973) and emperor of the Holy Roman Empire (962–973).
116. Sigmund Freud, (1856–1939) psychoanalyst (Die Traumdeutung). Founder of modern psycho-analysis. Born in Freiberg in Mähren, which was part of Austria at the time. Nowadays the town is located in the Czech Republic.
117. Christine Licci, businesswoman. Chief of Citibank.
118. Wilhelm Busch, (1832–1908) writer, illustrator and comics artist, (Max und Moritz).
119. Hildegard Hamm-Brücher, (1921–2016) politician.
120. Udo Lindenberg, (1946–) rock musician.
121. Eugen Drewermann, (1940–) theologian
122. Ferdinand Sauerbruch, (1875–1951) physician. Inventor of the Sauerbruch chamber.
123. Peter Maffay, (1949–) pop singer (Du). Born in Brașov, Romania.
124. Josef Frings, (1887–1978) cardinal and humanitarian activist.
125. Silke Fritzen, entry pushed by a group of internet users.
126. Max Planck, (1858–1947) physicist. Developed the quantum theory. Received the Nobel Prize in Physics in 1918.
127. Johannes Rau, (1931–2006) politician, Federal President 1999–2004
128. Jacob and Wilhelm Grimm, aka the Brothers Grimm , linguists and collectors of fairy tales.
129. Hieronymus Karl Friedrich, Freiherr von Münchhausen, nobleman whose tall tales inspired Rudolf Erich Raspe's novel The Adventures of Baron von Münchhausen.
130. Wilhelm II, German emperor 1888–1918 (1859–1941).
131. Rudolf Augstein, (1923–2002) journalist and publisher. Founder of Der Spiegel.
132. Heinrich Böll, (1917–1985) novelist (The Train Was on Time, The Lost Honour of Katharina Blum)
133. Ralf Schumacher, (1975–) racing driver.
134. Anne Frank, (1929–1945) writer of The Diary of Anne Frank. Moved to the Netherlands when she was young.
135. Frederick I, Holy Roman Emperor ("Barbarossa"), (1122–1190) emperor of the Holy Roman Empire (1155–1190).
136. Sigmund Jähn, (1937–2019) cosmonaut. First German in space.
137. Franziska van Almsick, (1978–) swimmer.
138. Clemens August Graf von Galen, (1878–1946) theologian and resistance fighter against the Nazis.
139. Ludwig II, (1845–1886) "the Fairy tale King", king of Bavaria (1864–1886).
140. Carl Friedrich Zeiss, physicist and businessman (Carl Zeiss AG)
141. Hildegard Knef, (1925–2002) film and theatre actress and singer.
142. Levi Strauss, (1829–1902) entrepreneur and inventor. Invented jeans.
143. Sepp Herberger, (1897–1977) football coach of the 1954 world cup winning team.
144. Klaus Kinski, (1926–1991) theatre and film actor.
145. Werner von Siemens, (1816–1892) physicist and businessman (Siemens). Invented the electric elevator.
146. Ferdinand Porsche, (1875–1951) businessman (Porsche).
147. Peter Scholl-Latour, (1924–2014) journalist.
148. August Heinrich Hoffmann von Fallersleben, (1798–1874) poet. Wrote the lyrics of the German national anthem.
149. Siegfried & Roy, illusionists and tiger tamers.
150. Christoph Langen, (1962–) bobsledder.
151. Michelle, (1972–) singer.
152. Manfred von Ardenne, (1907–1997) physicist. Invented the scanning electron microscope.
153. Gottfried Wilhelm Leibniz, (1646–1716) philosopher and mathematician. Proved Fermat's little theorem.
154. Arthur Schopenhauer, (1788–1860) philosopher (The World as Will and Representation).
155. Kurt Tucholsky, (1890–1935) novelist and journalist.
156. Karl and Theo Albrecht, businesspeople (Aldi).
157. Joseph Ratzinger, cardinal (became Pope Benedict XVI in 2005).
158. Werner Heisenberg, (1901–1976) physicist. Developed the Uncertainty principle. Received the Nobel Prize in Physics in 1932.
159. Harald Juhnke, (1929–2005) actor.
160. Till Eulenspiegel, folkloric figure. The only fictional character on the list.
161. Götz George, (1938–2016) TV, film and theatre actor and comedian.
162. Rudolf Diesel, (1858–1913) engineer and inventor. Invented the diesel engine.
163. Stefan Raab, (1966–) TV presenter and musician.
164. Hans Albers, (1891–1960) singer and actor.
165. Nina Hagen, (1955–) punk singer.
166. Johannes Kepler, (1571–1630) astronomer and mathematician. Developed the laws of planetary motion, improved the refracting telescope.
167. Hans Rosenthal, (1925–1987) radio and TV presenter.
168. Rupert Neudeck, (1939–2016) physician, journalist and humanitarian activist (Cap Anamur)
169. Dieter Hildebrandt, (1927–2013) comedian.
170. Marie Theres Kroetz-Relin, (1927–2013) actress.
171. Kilian Saum, priest and humanitarian activist.
172. Hans Söllner, (1955–) reggae singer.
173. Gregor Gysi, (1948–) (East) German politician.
174. Arminius, der Cherusker, Germanic leader who defeated a Roman army.
175. Günter Grass, (1927-2015) novelist (The Tin Drum). Received the Nobel Prize in Literature in 1999.
176. Inge Meysel, (1910–2004) film, theatre and TV actress.
177. Hans Hartz, (1943–2002) pop singer.
178. Karl Lagerfeld, (1933–2019) fashion designer.
179. Oliver Kahn, (1969–) association football player.
180. Gerd Müller, (1945–2021) association football player.
181. Ferdinand von Zeppelin, (1838–1917) inventor of the zeppelin.
182. Nicolaus Otto, (1832–1891) engineer and inventor. Invented the internal combustion engine.
183. Grete Schickedanz, business woman Quelle mail-order entrepreneur.
184. Clara Zetkin, (1857–1933) women's rights activist.
185. Hannah Arendt, (1906-1975) journalist and philosopher.
186. Roman Herzog, (1934–2017) Federal President (1994–1999).
187. Hermann Oberth, (1894–1989) rocket physicist.
188. Karl Valentin, (1882–1948) comedian and actor.
189. Frank Schöbel, (1942–) East German pop singer.
190. Jakob Fugger, (1459–1525) businessman.
191. Henry Maske, (1964–) boxer.
192. Helmut Zacharias, (1920–2002) violinist.
193. Michael Ballack, (1976–) association football player.
194. Bernhard Grzimek, animal scientist and film director (Serengeti Shall Not Die).
195. Richard Strauss, (1864–1949) (composer (Also Sprach Zarathustra, Four Last Songs)
196. Edmund Stoiber, (1941–) politician.
197. Klaus Störtebeker, (1360–1401) pirate.
198. Peter Frankenfeld, (1913–1979) radio and TV presenter and comedian.
199. Mildred Scheel, physician and humanitarian activist. Founded the German Cancer Aid.
200. Claudia Schiffer, (1970–) photo model.
