= Hans Peter Korff =

German actor (1942–2025)

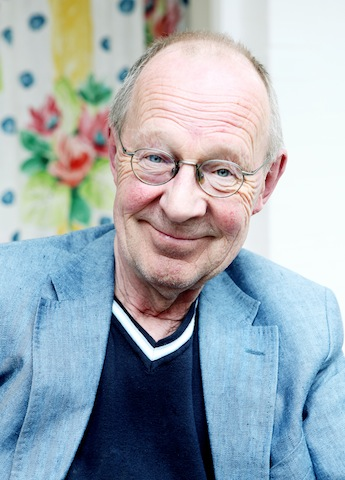
- Korff in 2008
- Born: 24 August 1942; Hamburg, Germany
- Died: 9 March 2025 (aged 82)
- Occupation: Actor
- Years active: 1964–2021
- Children: 2
- Website: leuchtmann-korff.de/m/index.html

Hans Peter Korff (24 August 1942 – 9 March 2025) was a German actor in theatre, film and television. He worked at notable German theatres and became popular in TV series such as Diese Drombuschs.

== Life and career ==
Korff was born in Hamburg on 24 August 1942. He was an apprentice to become a typesetter, like his father. At age 17, he joined a student theatre troupe led by Claus Peymann. He studied acting at the Hochschule für Musik und Theater Hamburg with Eduard Marks. He worked at different private theatres in Hamburg between 1964 and 1969, including the Ernst Deutsch Theater. He moved then to the Staatstheater Stuttgart, in 1972 to the Düsseldorfer Schauspielhaus, and in 1974 to Deutsches Schauspielhaus in Hamburg. He worked freelance from 1976, as a guest at the Münchner Kammerspiele and the Volksbühne in Berlin. He worked at the Schauspiel Bochum from 1984.

He worked as an actor in both film and television, playing in around 20 films, 60 television films and 70 television series. He became popular in television series for roles such as the postman Onkel Heini in the ZDF's Neues aus Uhlenbusch series for children (1977 to 1982) and Siegfried "Sigi" Drombusch in Diese Drombuschs (1983 to 1994). He played Uncle Hellmuth in Pappa Ante Portas, a 1991 Loriot film.

=== Personal life ===
Korff was married to the director Ina-Kathrin Korff (née Petzold) from 1964; they had a daughter, Franziska, born in 1965. His second wife was the actress Monica Bleibtreu, from the 1980s. He married his third wife, the actress Christiane Leuchtmann, in 1992. They had a son, Johannes Valentin Korff.

Korff died on 9 March 2025, at the age of 82.

== Filmography ==
=== Film ===
Films with Korff included:

- 1967: Der Eine – der Andere (short)
- 1969: Ich nicht (short)
- 1977: Die Anstalt
- 1978: Alzire oder der neue Kontinent
- 1981: Die Fälschung (Circle of Deceit)
- 1983: Peppermint Frieden
- 1989: Hab' ich nur Deine Liebe
- 1989: Wayfarers
- 1991: Pappa ante Portas
- 1992: Kinder der Landstraße
- 1992: Moebius
- 1995: Nich' mit Leo
- 1995: Halali
- 1999: Beresina oder Die letzten Tage der Schweiz
- 2003: Adam & Eva
- 2004: Wedding Daydream (short)
- 2007: GG 19
- 2010: Vater Morgana
- 2015: Sanctuary

=== Television films ===
- 1969: Gnade für Timothy Evans
- 1969: Zieh den Stecker raus, das Wasser kocht
- 1975: Die Stadt im Tal
- 1977: Unendlich tief unten
- 1979: The Great Runaway
- 1982: Drei gegen Hollywood
- 1986: Bankgeheimnisse
- 1989: Jenseits von Blau
- 1991: Unser Haus
- 1995: … nächste Woche ist Frieden
- 2001: The Publisher
- 2001: Vera Brühne
- 2002: Hannas Baby
- 2003: Mein Weg zu Dir
- 2006: Mein süßes Geheimnis
- 2007: Bezaubernde Marie
- 2010: Der Meisterdieb
- 2021: Meeresleuchten

=== Television series ===
- 1968: Polizeirevier 21
- 1969: Ein Jahr ohne Sonntag (6 episodes)
- 1974: Tatort – Nachtfrost
- 1977–1980: Neues aus Uhlenbusch (40 episodes)
- 1978: Tatort – Tatort: Sterne für den Orient
- 1979: Tatort – Tatort: Gefährliche Träume
- 1983–1985: Diese Drombuschs (13 episodes)
- 1994: Drei Mann im Bett (12 episodes)
- 1997–2000: Ein Mann steht seine Frau (4 episodes)
- 1998–1999: Dr. Stefan Frank (12 episodes)
- 1998–2007: Adelheid und ihre Mörder (26 episodes)
- 1999: Klemperer – Ein Leben in Deutschland (9 episodes)
- 2000: Tatort – Tatort: Blüten aus Werder
- 2003–2007: Der Fürst und das Mädchen (37 episodes)
- 2004: Polizeiruf 110 – Polizeiruf 110: Barbarossas Rache
- 2005: Der Bulle von Tölz – Mord im Kloster
- 2005–2007: Agathe kann's nicht lassen (5 episodes)
- 2007: Die ProSieben Märchenstunde – Prinzessin auf der Erbse
- 2008: Pfarrer Braun – Heiliger Bimbam
- 2009–2013: Tierärztin Dr. Mertens (22 episodes)
- 2009: Kommissar LaBréa – Tod an der Bastille
