= Englische Ansage =

1977 German comedy sketch by Loriot

"Englische Ansage" (German for "English Announcement") is a one-person comedy sketch written by German humorist Loriot. It shows a continuity announcer who summarizes the plot of an English crime series, but fails because of the hard-to-pronounce names. Alternative titles of the sketch are "Inhaltsangabe" (Synopsis) and "Die englische Inhaltsangabe" (The English Synopsis).

The sketch was first aired in November 1977 in the fourth episode of the TV series Loriot. The announcer was played by Evelyn Hamann. A text version of the sketch first appeared in 1981 and has since been included in several anthologies of Loriot.

== Plot ==
Overview of the roles in the crime series Die zwei Cousinen

The sketch shows a woman announcing the eighth episode of the 16-part English TV crime series Die zwei Cousinen (The Two Cousins). Before the start of the episode, the announcer wants to summarize the plot of the first seven episodes. This plot is highly absurd, contains numerous trivialities and is characterized by English names of people and places that are complicated to articulate for Germans. Examples are the two cousins Priscilla and Gwyneth Molesworth as well as Lord and Lady Hesketh-Fortescue and Lord Molesworth-Houghton. Mentioned places are Middle Fritham, Nether Addlethorpe, and North Cothelstone Hall, the country estate of the Hesketh-Fortescues. The announcer tries to pronounce the names as accurately as possible. In the course of the announcement, however, she increasingly mixes English phonemes with German words; for example, she uses th sounds to replace either an "s" ("Schlipth" instead of "Schlips"), a "ts" ("nachth" instead of "nachts"), a "z" (aufthuthuchen" instead of "aufzusuchen"), or a "t" ("triffth" instead of "trifft"). Despite these and other mistakes, the announcer continues her talk, but starts to stutter and becomes more and more desperate until she finally breaks off her announcement.

== Production and release ==
In preparation for the sketch Loriot contacted the British TV director Timothy Moores, with whom he had worked in his first TV series Cartoon and the show Loriots Telecabinet. He received a list of English names of persons and places from Moores, in which "th" and "s" are close together. Using these names, Loriot built the synopsis of the crime series. Evelyn Hamann, who played the television announcer, could read the text during the filming. She had, however, as usual for her, already memorized it.

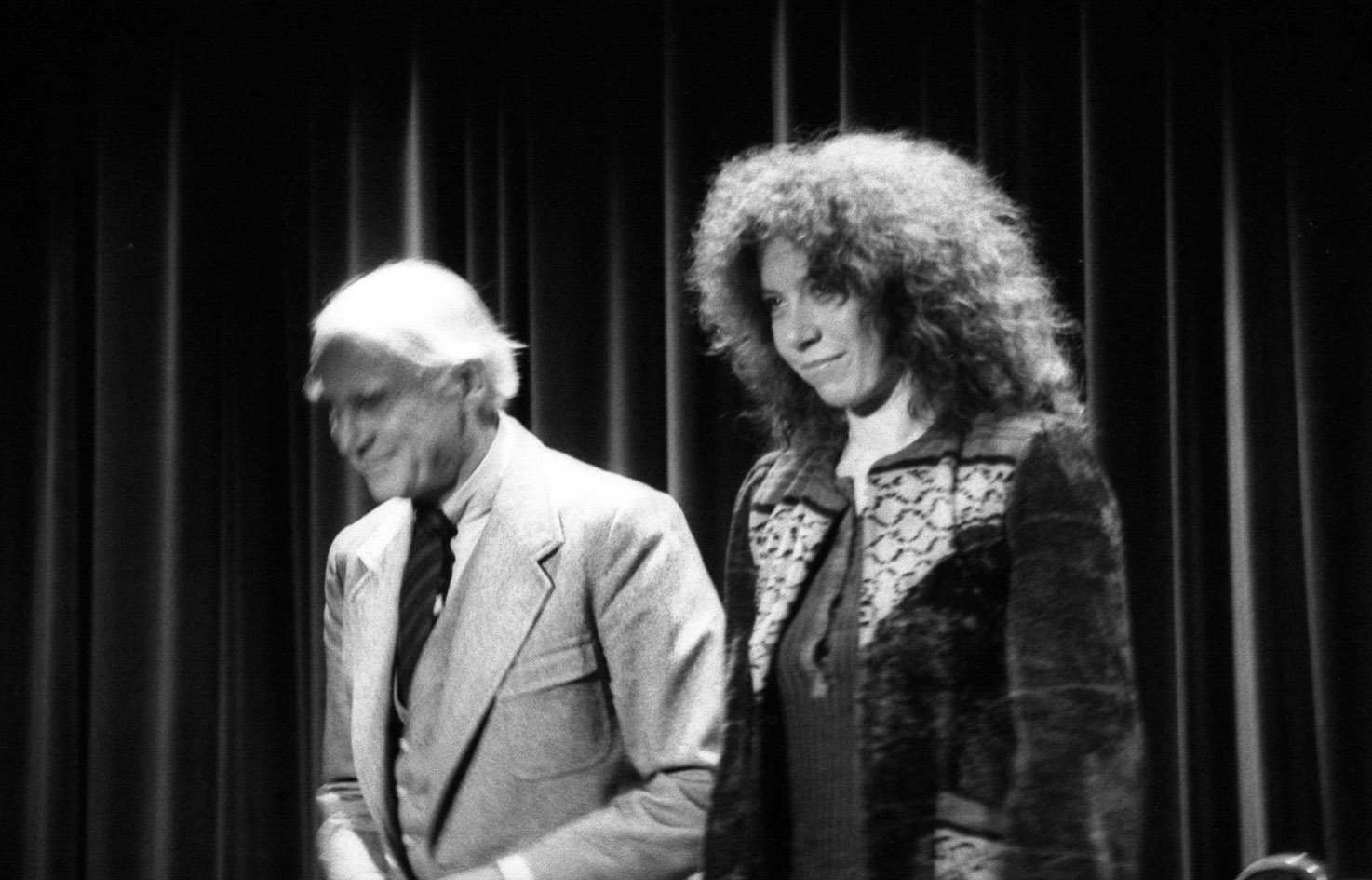
Loriot and Evelyn Hamann during a reading from Loriots Dramatische Werke, early 1980s

The sketch was shown in the fourth episode of the television series Loriot produced by Radio Bremen. The episode was first aired on Das Erste on 7 November 1977. There are four parts of the sketch in this episode. In the first part, the announcer already misspeaks in the first sentence of synopsis and breaks off. Loriot, sitting on his green sofa, then says that we will probably have to wait for the eighth episode of the crime drama. The second part of the sketch is over two minutes long. Here, black-and-white photographs are shown several times during the synopsis to illustrate the plot. After the announcer fails again, Loriot again gives a short commentary. In the third, short part, the announcer tries desperately to continue the summary at the point where she had broken it off in the second part, but fails again. The fourth and last part of the sketch can be seen after the end credits of the episode. Here, the announcer begins her contribution again from the beginning, but misses her point right at the start and then angrily bangs her fist on the table.

In the broadcast Loriots 60. Geburtstag (Loriot's 60th birthday) aired in November 1983, the sketch was shown again, but in a different version. It corresponds to the content of the second part of the version in Loriot, but deviates in details of the slips of the tongue. This version was also included in the VHS collection Loriots Vibliothek from 1984. The text of this version was published in 1981 in the anthology Loriots Dramatische Werke and is part of further publications of Loriot.

In 1997, Loriot reordered his television work and distributed the six old, 45-minute Loriot episodes to fourteen episodes with a length of 25 minutes. In this recut version, also titled Loriot, contributions from other Loriot shows such as Cartoon and Loriots Telecabinet were also included. It had become necessary because at the time German television stations no longer provided slots for comedy formats that were longer than 30 minutes. "Englische Ansage" is part of the ninth episode of this recut, titled "Ein Menü mit englischer Zunge, Kalbshaxe, Badewanne und Politik" (A menu with English tongue, veal shank, bathtub and politics). It was aired on 17 June 1997. The episode contains the original version with the four parts, but this time the last part is shown before the credits. Loriot's two comments from the original are also included in this episode.

The sketch "Englische Ansage" is contained three times in the DVD collection Loriot – Die vollständige Fernseh-Edition. In addition to the version from Loriot IV, the version from Loriots 60. Geburtstag is also included as an extra. Besides this, the sketch can be seen as a reading by Evelyn Hamann, which she gave together with Loriot in 1987 in the Palace of the Republic in East Berlin.

== Context and interpretation ==
"Englische Ansage" is interpreted as a satire on the German TV adaptations of scripts by the English writer Francis Durbridge that became blockbusters in West Germany in the 1960s. The multi-part crime movies were characterized by convoluted content, which was summarized by an announcer before the new episode was aired. The content of Die zwei Cousinen also serves the cliché of an England dominated by aristocrats.

Besides, the sketch can be understood as a parody of the pretended cosmopolitanism of some Germans who try to pronounce English words as accurately as possible. Loriot later addressed this topic again in his second movie Pappa Ante Portas, in which the protagonist Heinrich Lohse reads the English instead of the German version of a multilingual instruction manual to his wife.

The sketch has similarities with Loriot's sketch "Parkgebühren" (Parking fees). In both sketches, the protagonists played by Evelyn Hamann fail because of their linguistic inflexibility and the language used in their profession. While the television announcer from "Englische Ansage" despairs of pronouncing complicated English names, the meter maid in "Parkgebühren" fails to make herself understandable because of her officialese. Hamann's acting performance in both sketches was repeatedly highlighted as "brilliant".

== Home media ==
- Loriots Vibliothek. Band 4: Die Steinlaus und andere Katastrophen in Film und Fernsehen. Warner Home Video, Hamburg 1984, VHS No. 4 (version of Loriots 60. Geburtstag).
- Loriot – Sein großes Sketch-Archiv. Warner Home Video, Hamburg 2001, DVD No. 3 (as part of Loriot 9).
- Loriot – Die vollständige Fernseh-Edition. Warner Home Video, Hamburg 2007, DVD No. 4 (as part of Loriot IV and as extra in the version of Loriots 60. Geburtstag).
- Loriot – Die vollständige Fernseh-Edition. Warner Home Video, Hamburg 2007, DVD No. 5 (reading by Loriot and Evelyn Hamann).

== Text publications (selection) ==
- Loriots dramatische Werke. Zürich: Diogenes. 1981. pp. 300–303. ISBN 3-257-01004-4.
- Menschen, Tiere, Katastrophen. Stuttgart: Reclam. 1992. pp. 110–111. ISBN 3-15-008820-8.
- Das Frühstücksei. Zürich: Diogenes. 2003. pp. 280–281. ISBN 3-257-02081-3.
- Gesammelte Prosa. Zürich: Diogenes. 2006. pp. 356–358. ISBN 978-3-257-06481-0.

== Bibliography ==
- Neumann, Stefan (2011). Loriot und die Hochkomik. Leben, Werk und Wirken Vicco von Bülows (in German). Trier: Wissenschaftlicher Verlag Trier. ISBN 978-3-86821-298-3.
- Reuter, Felix Christian (2016). Chaos, Komik, Kooperation. Loriots Fernsehsketche. FILM – MEDIUM – DISKURS (in German). Vol. 70. Würzburg: Königshausen & Neumann. ISBN 978-3-8260-5898-1.
- Tulzer, Friedrich (2012). Loriot, der Dichter. Stuttgarter Arbeiten zur Germanistik (in German). Vol. 456. Stuttgart: Verlag Hans-Dieter Heinz. ISBN 978-3-88099-461-4.
