= Jodeldiplom =

Fictitious degree

The Jodeldiplom ("yodeling diploma") is a fictitious degree created for a sketch by German humorist Loriot. The sketch pokes fun at the numerous degrees awarded by universities and folk high schools, which grant their recipients social status without providing any meaningful qualifications for the labor market.

The term has since gained currency in German to refer to superfluous, useless, vanity-driven, or purchased academic qualifications (such as from a diploma mill), similar to the English terms underwater basket weaving or Mickey Mouse degree.

== Loriot sketch ==
The sketch "Yodeling School" was produced by Radio Bremen as part of the episode Loriot VI and first broadcast on Das Erste on 7 December 1978. The sketch takes place in the Institute for Modern Yodeling, where the adult students are practicing yodeling texts (for example: "Holleri du dödl di, diri diri dudl dö"). The yodeling instructor, Dr. Vogler, is meticulously dictating the correct pronunciation to his students, who repeat his dictation in unison. In response to an incorrect answer ("Dö dudl dö") by Mrs. Hoppenstedt (Evelyn Hamann), Dr. Vogler corrects her and says that "Dö dudl dö is future perfect tense used at sunrise."

Mrs. Hoppenstedt is interviewed after the course by a reporter Viktor Schmoller (Loriot) for the "Women's Journal of Radio Bremen". In the interview, Mrs. Hoppenstedt explains her participation in the course that as a housewife and mother, when the children are out of the house, she wants to have the feeling that she is standing on her own feet, and wants to have "something of her own", a "Jodeldiplom."

== Jodlar-Prob ==
A serious "yodeling diploma", the so-called "Jodlar-Prob" exists in the Allgäu Alps. In 1934, the Wertacher Jodlergruppe was founded as one of the first yodeling groups in the Allgäu. Every year in Wertach, the "Wertacher Jodlar-Prob" takes place to preserve and continue the tradition. The shared knowledge of yodeling is offered in a seminar.

== Yodeling degree ==
The Lucerne University of Applied Sciences and Arts in Lucerne, Switzerland announced Yodeling as a course of study beginning in the winter semester 2018. At the end of the course of study, the students will be awarded a Bachelor of Arts in music.
