= Mickey Mouse degrees =

Term for university degrees regarded as worthless

Mickey Mouse degrees (or Mickey Mouse courses) is a term used to describe university degrees or courses regarded as worthless or irrelevant. The term is a dysphemism, originating in the common usage of Mickey Mouse as a pejorative. It came to prominence in the UK after use by the country's national tabloids. The term was used in an episode of the BBC university-based comedy drama A Very Peculiar Practice in 1986 to refer to education courses, written by former academic Andrew Davies.

== Origins ==
The term was used by the Minister of State for Universities Margaret Hodge, in a public seminar on higher education expansion. Hodge defined a Mickey Mouse course as "one where the content is perhaps not as rigorous as one would expect and where the degree itself may not have huge relevance in the labour market"; and that, furthermore, "simply stacking up numbers on Mickey Mouse courses is not acceptable". Hodge herself took a Third in Economics. Many MPs in the House of Commons have read PPE. In June 2024, Kay Burley asked the Education Minister Damian Hinds if his PPE degree from Oxford was not indeed a Mickey Mouse degree. This opinion is often raised in the summer when exam results are released and new university courses revealed. The phrase took off in the late 1990s, as the Labour government created the target of having 50% of students in higher education by 2010.

== Examples ==
Comedian Jay Leno quipped that "in college, philosophy majors study if the glass is half full or if the glass is half empty. See, this prepares them for careers later as waiters."

In 2000, Staffordshire University received negative press coverage when a module on the sociological importance of football which had been designed for students taking sociology, sports science, or media studies was portrayed as a "degree in David Beckham Studies". A professor for the department stressed that the course would not focus on Beckham, and that the module examines "the rise of football from its folk origins in the 17th century, to the power it's become and the central place it occupies in British culture, and indeed world culture, today". In July 2015, UK Independence Party MEP Louise Bours referred to the module on Question Time, but as though it was a full degree course. Other degrees deemed "Mickey Mouse" include "golf management" and "surf science". Durham University designed an optional module centred around Harry Potter to examine "prejudice, citizenship and bullying in modern society" as part of a B.A. degree in Education Studies.

One thing these courses share is that they are "vocational", which are perceived to be less intellectually rigorous than the traditional academic degrees.

Defenders of these courses object that the derogatory comments made in the media rely on the low symbolic capital of new subjects and rarely discuss course contents beyond the titles. Another factor is the perception that the take up of these subjects, and the decline of more traditional academic subjects like science, engineering, or mathematics, is causing annual grade rise in the United Kingdom.

== A-level subjects and "soft options" ==
The A-level in General Studies is seen as a Mickey Mouse subject, as well as A-level Critical Thinking, with many universities not accepting it as part of the requirements for an offer.

Additionally, although not considered Mickey Mouse subjects as such, some qualifications are not preferred by top universities and are regarded as "soft options". A 2007 report stated that the sciences were more challenging than subjects such as Media Studies, which might be taken by students to get higher grades for university applications. An American example is a degree in physical education. These have been issued to members of the college's athletics teams, to make them eligible to play; otherwise they would fail to pass traditional subjects.

== See also ==
- Academic inflation
- Diploma mill
- Jodeldiplom
- List of Advanced Level subjects
- MRS Degree
- Scholarly method
- Underwater basket weaving
