= Studiointerview =

Cartoon sketch by Loriot

Studiointerview (also The interview or Plastology) is a cartoon sketch by the German humorist Loriot. Divided into four individual sections, it is part of the first episode of the television series Loriot, which was first broadcast in March 1976. The content of the sketch is a television interview with a scientist who is able to enlarge his own body parts using breathing techniques. With the television and science parody as well as the depiction of failed communication, the sketch takes up three basic motifs of Loriot's television work. It also contains a number of sexual allusions, a typical creative device for Loriot.

Studiointerview was also shown in the re-edited version of the series Loriot from 1997. The text of the sketch first appeared in 1981 and has since been included in several Loriot anthologies.

== Action ==
The sketch has a total length of around six minutes. You see two men sitting on chairs in a television studio. Both are drawn as the bulbous-nosed men typical of Loriot. The one on the left is the TV presenter Gilling, the one on the right is Professor Häubl, holder of the Chair of Pneumatic Plastology. Gilling wants to interview Häubl but has to wait for the program to start because, as he suspects, something is wrong with the technology. Gilling tries to bridge the waiting time with small talk. He talks about his star sign (Pisces) and that of his wife (Capricorn). However, Häubl only addresses this to a very limited extent by talking about his long-haired dachshunds. As they are still not on air, Gilling asks Häubl whether he knows three (generally unknown) people from Gilling's circle. Häubl denies this each time and responds with a question about Professor Duwe, who is unknown to Gilling, to make the absurdity of his questions clear to Gilling.

When the interview finally begins, Häubl initially doesn't feel like doing the interview because of the long wait. After Gilling remarks that everyone else would be happy to be allowed to broadcast his nonsense on television, he finally gives the information. Pneumatic plastology enables plastic changes to be made to one's own body through breathing techniques. He also demonstrates this when Gilling asks. He holds his breath until his head turns red and uses it to enlarge his index finger, which becomes about 30 cm long and 8 cm thick. Shortly afterwards, he also enlarges his ears tenfold. He also guides Gilling in a self-experiment in which he enlarges his nose to a length of about 20 cm and a thickness of 15 cm. In contrast to Häubl, whose body parts return to normal size after exhaling forcefully, Gilling is unable to reduce the size of his nose again. Häubl blames Gilling's clumsiness for this and advises him to come to his consultation at the end of August.

== Production and publication ==
The animated film was created in Loriot's animation studio, which he founded in the early 1970s in Percha on Lake Starnberg not far from his home Ammerland and where he employed up to five people. As is usual in Loriot's animated films, Häubling's and Gilling's mouth movements are synchronized with their spoken words. To achieve this, a large number of individually drawn phases were necessary. As with almost all of his animated films, Loriot took on the two speaking roles himself.

The cartoon was shown for the first time in the first episode of the series Loriot, entitled Loriot's Clean Screen, which was broadcast on German Television on March 8, 1976. The film is divided into four sections, which are shown throughout the entire episode. The first part is shown before the title is shown and is therefore the first segment of the entire series. Initially, it is only about Gilling's suspicion that something is wrong with the technology. The second part contains a conversation about zodiac signs and long-haired dachshunds. In the third section of the film, we see the dialog about the unknown persons. The fourth and final part of the cartoon is introduced by an announcement from Loriot sitting on a green sofa. This is the first time we learn the names of the two people portrayed. In contrast to the cartoon, the first names Gillings (Hartmut) and Häubls (Wilhelm) as well as the University of Tübingen as the seat of the Chair of Pneumatic Plastology are also mentioned here.

Loriot's Clean Screen was positively reviewed by Manfred Sack in Zeit after the broadcast. You have to laugh a lot and loudly at the mocking jokes. He rated the animated film Studiointerview as "a nice, harmless, not entirely meaningless piece of nonsense."

In 1997, Loriot reorganized his television work and divided the six old 45-minute Loriot episodes into 14 episodes with a length of 25 minutes. This recut version, also entitled Loriot, also included contributions from other Loriot programs such as Cartoon and Loriot's Telecabinet. It had become necessary because, at the time, German television stations no longer provided slots for comedy formats that were longer than 30 minutes. Studiointerview is part of the sixth episode Unusual things from the concert hall, bad luck in the studio and a living room catastrophe, which premiered on Das Erste on May 27, 1997. celebrated its premiere. In it, the sketch is divided into the same four parts as in the original version, but Loriot's announcement for the last part is missing. The film was also shown in its entirety in the show for Loriot's 70th birthday on November 12, 1993.

In the 1984 VHS collection Loriots Vibliothek, which contains many sketches by Loriot and a few by Cartoon, the Studiointerview is included in a version without interruption. The DVD collection The Complete Television Edition from 2007 also contains this version of the cartoon as part of Loriot's Clean Screen. While compiling the DVD collection, it was noticed that there were two versions of the film, differing only in the pattern of Häubl's tie. While he wore a dotted tie on the MAZ tape from Radio Bremen, it was striped in a film from Loriot's archive. Due to the better quality, Loriot and his friend and collaborator Stefan Lukschy opted for the striped version.

The text of Studiointerview first appeared in 1981 in the anthology Loriot's Dramatic Works, which contains the texts of most of the sketches from the series Loriot as well as some of Loriot's other television works. The sketch is assigned to the chapter Culture and Television. The text has since been published in other Loriot anthologies.

== Analysis ==
Gilling's character is a clear critic of television, which Loriot had already expressed in earlier sketches. At several points, Gilling demonstrates his obvious incompetence and poor preparation for the interview. For example, Häubl has to draw his attention to the red light on the camera that indicates the start of the interview. He changes the name of Häubl's chair to "plasmatic pneutology". Even after a correction by Häubl, he is unable to pronounce the correct name and instead uses his modification once again. Another word twist occurs when he says that Häubl is in a "legal public institution", a distortion of the phrase public-law. Gilling's exclamation "Sa-gen-haft!" in response to Häubl's simple statement that pneumatic plastology is based on new findings in the psychosomatic field also illustrates Gilling's only very superficial approach to the subject of the interview from the point of view of Germanist Uwe Ehlert, who dealt with the representation of misunderstandings in Loriot's work in his dissertation.

Häubl's behavior is also viewed negatively. According to Uwe Ehlert, Häubl's assertion that Gilling could apply his method himself without prior knowledge showed his overestimation of his own abilities as a scientist. After Gilling fails to change his nose back, Häubl quickly moves on to accusing Gilling of denying any responsibility for the accident and trying to make himself unassailable as a scientist. Häubl's response to Gilling's question about the usefulness of his development reminds the German scholar Stefan Neumann, who wrote his doctoral thesis on Loriot's life and work, of the clichéd answers given by real scientists to such questions. According to Häubl, scientists work altruistically in the service of humanity and science is not a question of usefulness, but of progress. However, Häubl's altruism is called into question by himself at the end when he quotes Gilling in his consultation. In addition, Uwe Ehlert points out a logical error in Häubl's argument, because research "in the service of humanity" also presupposes that the results are useful.

In addition to parodying television and science, faulty communication plays such a central role in the studio interview that the German scholar Felix Christian Reuter describes the cartoon in his dissertation on Loriot's television sketches as "a veritable treasure trove of communication errors". The first such disruption occurs at the beginning of the sketch. In response to Gilling's question as to whether there is something wrong with the technology, Häubl replies that he is not allowed to ask him that. Gilling cannot hear this answer and asks: "What do you mean?" Häubl then repeats his statement, which Gilling now relates to his second question. The two subsequently fail to clear up the misunderstanding. After a brief back-and-forth, they return to the initial problem, with Gilling again failing to understand Häubl's statement that he should not ask him about technical problems. This is the first time the sketch is interrupted in the TV version, which resolves the disruption and the two can continue their conversation undisturbed in the next part.

Gilling's attempt to bridge the waiting time can also be seen as a breakdown in communication. There are some similarities in the phrases in their conversation that suggest a supposed response to the other ("Capricorn and fish go quite well / I used to have two long-haired dachshunds, that didn't work at all"). However, both are actually conducting a monologue and are not interested in what the other has to say. According to Uwe Ehlert, this behavior, in which the interlocutor only serves as a cue, is often found in everyday communication. Felix Christian Reuter sees Gilling's questions about various people from his circle of acquaintances as a parody of the rhetorical trick of name-dropping, in which the speaker tries to enhance his own status by mentioning prominent names.

The studio interview also contains a number of sexual allusions that are typical of Loriot's work. For example, Professor Häubl's enlarged finger is strongly reminiscent of an oversized phallus. Gilling's subsequent question as to whether he could do this with any part of his body echoes the clichéd desire of many men for a larger penis. When Häubl wants to enlarge another body part, Gilling tries to prevent this, probably out of fear of obscenities on television. Häubl's tip to Gilling to think of something cold to make his nose smaller can also be understood in sexual terms.

== Classification in the overall work ==
At the beginning of his career, which began in 1950, Loriot worked as a humorous cartoonist for various magazines. From 1967, his main field of activity shifted to television. He hosted the television series Cartoon, according to the subtitle "[e]in Streifzug quer durch den gezeichneten Humor". In the beginning, the series was primarily conceived as a documentary program to present humorous drawings and cartoonists from Germany and abroad. However, Loriot also contributed his own works right from the start. These initially consisted mainly of short animated films, which can be seen as a link between Loriot's cartoon work and his later real film contributions. In the course of his television career, the cartoons were increasingly replaced by real film sketches and were later limited to the depiction of animals or abstract or absurd situations such as the "studio interview".

Compared to his animated films produced for Cartoon, Studiointerview is considerably longer at six minutes. The subdivision of the film in the television episode was an innovation which, from Stefan Neumann's point of view, enabled Loriot to avoid length and also to make the passing of time, which is important for the sketch, clear. Loriot used this stylistic device several more times in the course of Loriot, for example in Gentlemen in the Bath and Talking Dog.

With the depiction of a television program, Studiointerview takes up the most important basic motif in Loriot's television work at the time. Fictional television interviews were already frequently shown in the TV series Cartoon, initially as cartoons, such as in Family User, later also as live-action films, such as in Der Astronaut. In the one-off program Loriot's Telecabinet, which was broadcast in 1974, two years after the end of Cartoon, the parody of a television talk show formed the framework of the program. The first episode of Loriot also focused on this theme. In addition to the studio interview, most of the other contributions, including the well-known sketch The Lottery Winner, also dealt with television. In the subsequent episodes of Loriot, television parody became less important. Instead, topics relating to men and women as well as the family came to the fore, which mainly characterize the third and sixth episodes. These themes are also the main motifs of Loriot's feature films Oedipussi and Pappa ante portas.

The special form of the scientist interview has also been shown several times in Cartoon. Like Häubl's ability to enlarge his body parts using only breathing techniques, these sketches were also characterized by the depiction of the impossible. In the cartoon Kaninchen, for example, a Professor Mutzenberger talks about how he transformed women into rabbits, and in the real-life film sketch Professor E. Damholzer, the scientist of the title presents a method for reducing the size of people to less than one millimeter. In Loriot, the motif was taken up again in the fourth episode of the animated film The Talking Dog, in which the director of an animal education college claims to have taught his dog to talk. From Felix Christian Reuter's point of view, Loriot used these depictions to express his criticism of the belief in progress and his doubts about the feasibility of all things in the field of science and technology. Stefan Neumann also sees a connection between this type of sketch and the blind faith in science that prevailed at the time of their first broadcast and has persisted to this day. Another characteristic of Loriot's scientific parodies are invented technical terms that caricature the usual scientific language. "Pneumatic plastology" is an example of this. It is composed of the real adjective "pneumatic" and the invented word "plastology". The latter in turn combines the morpheme "plasto", which is reminiscent of the Greek adjective πλαστός (plastos) ("formed", "shaped", but also "invented", "lied"), with the word ending -logy, which is common in science and comes from the word λόγος (logos).

As in the studio interview, faulty or failed communication also plays an important role in Loriot's other interview situations. This theme is a central motif in Loriot's work and characterizes not only his portrayals of public television appearances, but also those of private discussions, especially between men and women. In 1988, Loriot confessed in an interview with Hellmuth Karasek in Spiegel: '[...] I am most interested in people with communication problems. Everything that I find funny arises from crumbled communication, from talking past each other, from the problems of expressing oneself, but also from understanding what is being said." Uwe Ehlert used the "almost inexhaustible pool" of examples of problematic communication in his dissertation on the "Representation of misunderstandings in Loriot's work."

== Sound carrier ==
- Loriots Vibliothek. Band 4: Die Steinlaus und andere Katastrophen in Film und Fernsehen. Warner Home Video, Hamburg 1984, VHS No. 4 (in one piece).
- Loriot – Sein großes Sketch-Archiv. Warner Home Video, Hamburg 2001, DVD No. 2 (as part of Loriot 6).
- Loriot – Die vollständige Fernseh-Edition. Warner Home Video, Hamburg 2007, DVD No. 3 (as part of Loriot's Clean Screen).
- Loriot – Die vollständige Fernseh-Edition. Warner Home Video, Hamburg 2007, DVD No. 4 (in one piece).

== Text publications (selection) ==
- Loriots dramatische Werke, Zürich: Diogenes, 1981, pp. 294–297, ISBN 3-257-01004-4
- Das Frühstücksei, Zürich: Diogenes, 2003, pp. 273–279, ISBN 3-257-02081-3
- Gesammelte Prosa, Zürich: Diogenes, 2006, pp. 348–355, ISBN 978-3-257-06481-0

== Literature ==
- Uwe Ehlert: „Das ist wohl mehr 'ne Kommunikationsstörung". The representation of misunderstandings in Loriot's work. ALDA! Der Verlag, Nottuln 2004, ISBN 3-937979-00-X, pp. 297-315 (also dissertation at the University of Münster 2003).
- Stefan Neumann (2011), Loriot und die Hochkomik. Leben, Werk und Wirken Vicco von Bülows, Trier: Wissenschaftlicher Verlag Trier, ISBN 978-3-86821-298-3
- Felix Christian Reuter: Chaos, Komik, Kooperation. Loriots Fernsehsketche (= Oliver Jahraus, Stefan Neuhaus [Hrsg.]: FILM - MEDIUM - DISCOURSE. Volume 70). Königshausen & Neumann, Würzburg 2016, ISBN 978-3-8260-5898-1 (also dissertation at the University of Trier 2015)
