= Underwater basket weaving =

Humorous academic idiom

Underwater basket weaving is an idiom referring, pejoratively, to useless or absurd college or university courses and often generally to refer to a perceived decline in educational standards.

The term also serves as an intentionally humorous generic answer to questions about an academic degree. It is also used to humorously refer to any non-academic elective course, specifically one that does not count towards any graduation requirements.

== Early use ==
The phrase in its pejorative sense has been used since at least the mid-1950s. According to a 1953 article in the Boston Globe on "Hepster Lingo", "Any snap course in school is 'underwater basket weaving.'" In a letter to the editor of the Los Angeles Times in 1956, a correspondent bemoaned an alleged decline in academic standards among college football programs and mentioned "majoring in underwater basket weaving, or the preparation and serving of smorgasbord, or, particularly at Berkeley, the combined course of anatomy and panty-raiding". The following year, an article in the National Review mentioned that "the bored students in the educationists' courses call those dreary subjects 'underwater basket-weaving courses'", and another year on a newspaper column noted that "One seaside university is bowing to the stern educational demands of the times by eliminating its popular course in underwater basket weaving". An article in the Daily Collegian at Penn State University in 1961 refers to a parody in which "a typical Miami coed majoring in underwater basket weaving was interviewed". An article from 1976 refers to football players so dumb that they had to take underwater basket weaving, and another 1976 article refers to underwater basket-weaving as "an old old family joke".

== Current use ==
In recent years, many subjects in the humanities have adopted scientific methodologies under the category of social sciences. Some of the courses offered in these subjects have drawn criticism; for instance, an op-ed expressed concern over the lack of rigor and scientific relevancy in coursework at the University of Minnesota. Such criticism has been accused of unfairly stereotyping the social sciences as underwater basket weaving subjects.

Dave Ramsey, American personal finance writer and radio host, has used the self-invented term "German Polka History" to describe university degree programs with poor career prospects outside academia, and which he advises people against pursuing. He uses the term along with an equally fictitious degree in "Left-Handed Puppetry" as an umbrella description to avoid singling any specific real-world degree for ridicule.

== Notable uses ==
Some of the boys she knew from college were trying to dodge the draft by taking graduate courses, "underwater basket weaving and things like that," as Vonda contemptuously put it.

— Rick Atkinson, The Long Gray Line

This is no surprise, as normal office job functions generally require little knowledge of underwater basket-weaving, 19th century Hungarian clog art, or other things of academic interest.

— Jacob Lund Fisker, Early Retirement Extreme: A Philosophical and Practical Guide to Financial Independence

The phrase was used during the Vietnam War era to describe the sort of major that many young men who would otherwise not have entered college undertook to escape the draft. US Senator Gordon L. Allott referred in 1968 to "the situation that we were in after World War II where we had universities setting up courses in underwater basket weaving, and all this sort of thing". Senator Robert Byrd used the phrase in 1969 when questioning the use of funds to offer professional training to Cuban refugees. The University of Portsmouth had a joke syllabus for underwater basket weaving on the Technology faculty pages, and another joke syllabus proposal was posted by a University of Central Arkansas student magazine.

US punk band NOFX referred to an underwater basket weaving course in their song "Anarchy Camp".

Moral of the story: neither writing “theoretical nuclear intergalactic business physics” nor “underwater basket weaving” will give you an edge in the admissions process, so just be honest!

— MIT

The phrase appears in the MIT application process as a humorous example suggesting students should simply state their current interests.

== Literal use ==
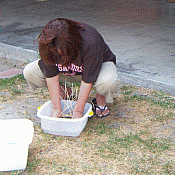
A woman soaking weaving material in water

The phrase "underwater basket weaving" is sometimes used to refer to a literal activity of weaving a basket while the materials – or, fancifully, the entire bodies of the weavers – are underwater.

In the weaving of willow baskets, a trough of water is needed in which to soak the dried willow rods. They are then left to stand until pliable and ready to be used in weaving. The weaving itself is usually not done under water, however.

An issue of The American Philatelist from 1956 refers to the village of Stebbins, Alaska where "Underwater basket weaving is the principal industry of the employables among the 94 Eskimos here. By way of explanation – the native reeds used in this form of basketry are soaked in water and the weavers create their handiwork with their hands and raw materials completely submerged in water throughout the process of manufacture".

== As a taught course ==
Since 1980, Reed College in Portland, Oregon has occasionally offered an underwater basket weaving class during Paideia, its festival of learning that offers informal, non-credit courses.

The Student Resource Center at the University of Arizona offered a submerged snorkeling basket-weaving course in spring 1998. In early 2009, a Rutgers University scuba diving instructor offered a one-off course. Underwater Basket Weaving is a trademark of the US Scuba Center Inc., which offers a specialty class designed to improve or more fully enjoy diving skills from which participants can "take home a memorable souvenir".

As an April Fools joke, Coursera offered an online course on underwater basket weaving on April 1, 2013. The class was supposed to "consist of short lecture and demonstration videos, between eight and ten minutes in length, short quizzes, and practical weaving exercises".

== See also ==
- Boondoggle
- Extreme ironing
- Grade inflation
- Jodeldiplom
- Mickey Mouse degrees
- MRS degree
- Science wars
