= Interview (disambiguation) =

An interview is a type of conversation.

Interview may also refer to:

== Film and television ==
- Interview (1971 film), an Indian Bengali-language film by Mrinal Sen
- Interview (1973 film), an Indian Malayalam-language film
- Interview (1979 film), a Canadian film by Caroline Leaf and Veronika Soul
- Intervista or Interview, a 1987 Italian film
- The Interview (1995 film)
- The Interview (1998 film), an Australian film by Craig Monahan
- Interview (2003 film), a Dutch film by Theo van Gogh
- Interview (2007 film), an American remake by Steve Buscemi of the Dutch film
- Interview (2010 film), a German film by Sebastian Marka
- The Interview, a 2014 American film by Seth Rogen and Evan Goldberg
- The Interview (2021 film), an Indian Hindi-language film by Laurence Postma, remake of the Dutch film
- Interview (TV series), a 2018 Australian chat show hosted by Andrew Denton
- "The Interview" (M*A*S*H), a television episode
- The Interview (The Morning Show), an episode of the American television series The Morning Show
- "The Interview" (Peep Show), a television episode
- "The Interviews", an episode of Chalk

== Music ==
- Interview (album), a 1976 album by Gentle Giant
- Interviews (album), a 1982 Bob Marley interview album
- Interview (band), a pop/rock band from Bath, Somerset, England
- "The Interview", an interlude by R. Kelly from the album R.

== Other ==
- Interview (magazine), a magazine founded by Andy Warhol in 1969
- Interview (research)
- Interview (journalism)
- Studiointerview (sketch comedy)
- Interview Island, one of the Andaman Islands, India

== See also ==
- Q&A (disambiguation)
