= Agathe kann's nicht lassen =

- Genre: Crime drama, Heimatfilm, comedy
- Starring: Ruth Drexel and Hans-Peter Korff
- Countries of origin: Austria; Germany
- No. of seasons: 2
- No. of episodes: 5

Production
- Running time: 90 minutes

Original release
- Release: 2005 – 2007

Agathe kann's nicht lassen was an Austrian and German detective comedy television series which ran between 2005 and 2007. It was based upon Agatha Christie's Miss Marple.

== List of Episodes ==
Season	Episode	Title	Air-Date
1	1	"Murder in the Abbey"	27 October 2005
1	2	"All or Nothing"	3 November 2005
2	1	"The Body in the Boathouse"	21 December 2006
2	2	"Murder with Handicap"	30 December 2006
2	3	"Deathtrap"	4 January 2007

== See also ==
- List of German television series
