= Ahlbeck Pier =

Pier in Ahlbeck, Germany

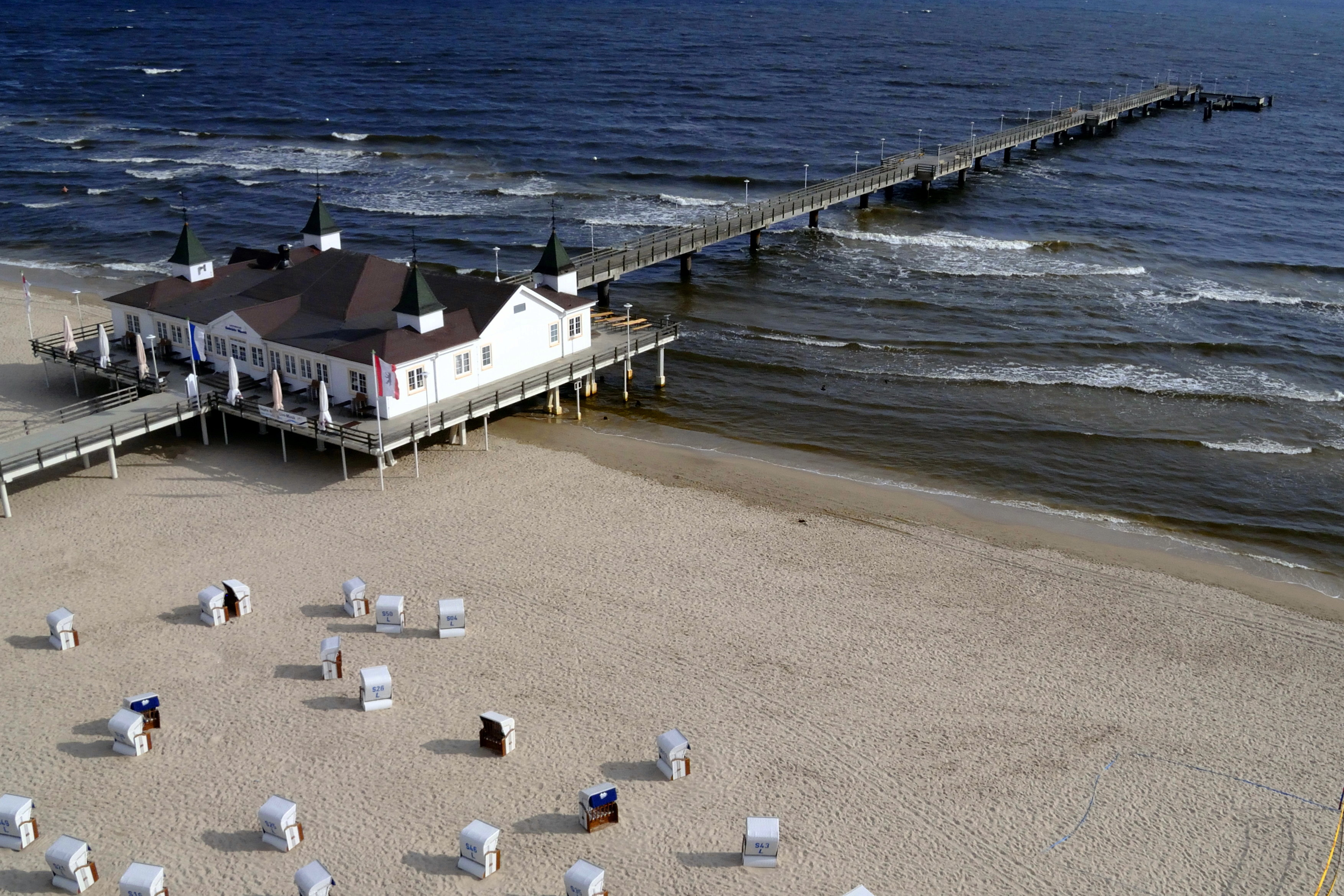
- Ahlbeck Pier
- Type: Pleasure Pier
- Coordinates: 53°56′39″N 14°11′34″E
- Official name: Seebrücke Ahlbeck

Characteristics
- Total length: 280 metres (920 ft)

History
- Opening date: 1899

Ahlbeck Pier (German: Seebrücke Ahlbeck Polish: Molo w Czerninie) - a pier located in Ahlbeck, on the island of Usedom; it is the oldest pier in Germany. The pier stretches from the Imperial Beach for 280 metres into the Baltic Sea. The pier has a restaurant and a jetty at the end, primarily used for sightseeing tours in the Bay of Pomerania.

== History ==
In 1882, a platform which extended from the promenade was built and housed a restaurant, in 1898 works began for the platform to be extended for 280 metres into the Baltic Sea. The main function of the pier was to function as a jetty for sailing ships.

In 1905, the pier was joined with the platform which housed the restaurant. In 1926, the canvas boardwalk located in the mid-section of the pier was replaced with wooden planks. Throughout the pier's existence it has undergone many renovations to replace any rotten elements. In 1970 to 1973 the pier had undergone a major reconstruction in which the wooden pillars and structure were replaced by steel girders.

== In popular culture ==
The pier is a popular filming location. Notable films in which it can be seen include Pappa Ante Portas and Die Russen kommen.
