= Neues aus Uhlenbusch =

- Country of origin: Germany
- No. of episodes: 40

Original release
- Release: 24 December 1977

Neues aus Uhlenbusch is a German television series for children related to the living in the fictive farming village Uhlenbusch.

Between 1977 and 1982, a total of 40 episodes were produced by the public broadcasting corporation ZDF. Also a movie was produced in 1980 incorporating three episodes put into one framework.

== Casts ==
- Hans Peter Korff: Uncle Heini
- Trude Breitschopf: Grandma Piepenbrink
- Hildegard Wensch: Aunt Appelboom
- Uwe Dallmeier: Farmer Brömmelkamp
- Moritz Bleibtreu: Moritz

== See also ==
- List of German television series
