= Der Lottogewinner =

Der Lottogewinner ("The lottery winner") is a comedy sketch by German humorist Loriot. It was first broadcast in 1976 in the TV show Loriot, starring Heinz Meier and Claus Dieter Clausnitzer.

== Plot ==
The central character of the sketch is 66 years old retiree Erwin Lindemann (Heinz Meier) who has won 500,000 Deutsche Mark in the lottery. Sitting in a chair in his living room, he is interviewed by a TV team for the evening news. Lindemann, visibly nervous, is only asked to give this short statement:

Ich heiße Erwin Lindemann, bin Rentner und 66 Jahre. Mit meinem Lottogewinn von 500.000 D-Mark mache ich erstmal eine Reise nach Island, dann fahre ich mit meiner Tochter nach Rom und besuche eine Papstaudienz. Und im Herbst eröffne ich dann in Wuppertal eine Herren-Boutique
My name is Erwin Lindemann, I am a retiree and 66 years old. With my lottery prize of 500,000 D-Mark I will first make a trip to Iceland, then I will go with my daughter to Rome for a papal audience. And in autumn, I will open a gentlemen's boutique in Wuppertal.

— Loriot, Der Lottogewinner

Because of various technical issues and adjustments made by the increasingly frustrated director, Lindemann is repeatedly interrupted and has to repeat his text several times, which makes him more confused after each shot. Finally, the cinematographer warns that film is running out, and the director is satisfied with Lindemann's last attempt, which is performed reasonably fluently, but has become completely jumbled:

Ich heiße ... na! ... Erwin ... ich heiße Erwin und bin Rentner. Und in 66 Jahren fahre ich nach Island ... und da mache ich einen Gewinn von 500.000 D-Mark ... und im Herbst eröffnet dann der Papst mit meiner Tochter eine Herren-Boutique in Wuppertal.
My name is... well! ... Erwin... my name is Erwin and I'm a retiree. And in 66 years I will go to Iceland... and there I will receive a prize of 500,000 D-Mark... And in autumn, the Pope will open a gentlemen's boutique in Wuppertal with my daughter.

— Loriot, Der Lottogewinner

== Broadcast and reception ==
Der Lottogewinner was the last of 15 sketches in the first episode of the six-part TV series Loriot, first broadcast on 8 March 1976 on ARD. It is considered one of the most famous sketches by Loriot and Heinz Meier's best-known role.

Loriot originally intended the character of Erwin Lindemann to speak with a slight West Low German accent. Meier, who was from near Königsberg and perfectly spoke East Prussian (High Prussian) dialect, convinced Loriot of letting speak Lindemann in a slightly East Prussian idiom.

According to Jörg Thomann in the Frankfurter Allgemeine Zeitung, with the character of the confused Erwin Lindemann, Loriot created "a moving portrayal of the modern individual who is pushed by their fellow human beings (in this case: a director) towards self-denial and, through all their ambitions (such as the gentlemen's boutique in Wuppertal), losing their bearing – until they forget their own name". Loriot, who usually starred himself in his sketches, was referring to the popularity of the character when he said to Heinz Meier: "I have made two big mistakes: I didn't build a basement for my house, and I let you play Lindemann".

== Sources ==
- Loriot: Gesammelte Prosa. Alle Dramen, Geschichten, Festreden, Liebesbriefe, Kochrezepte, der legendäre Opernführer und etwa zehn Gedichte. Zürich: Diogenes Verlag, 2006. ISBN 978-3-25706-481-0
- Stefan Lukschy: Der Glückliche schlägt keine Hunde. Ein Loriot-Porträt. Berlin: Aufbau-Verlag, 2015. ISBN 978-3-7466-3106-6
