= Münsing =

- Municipality
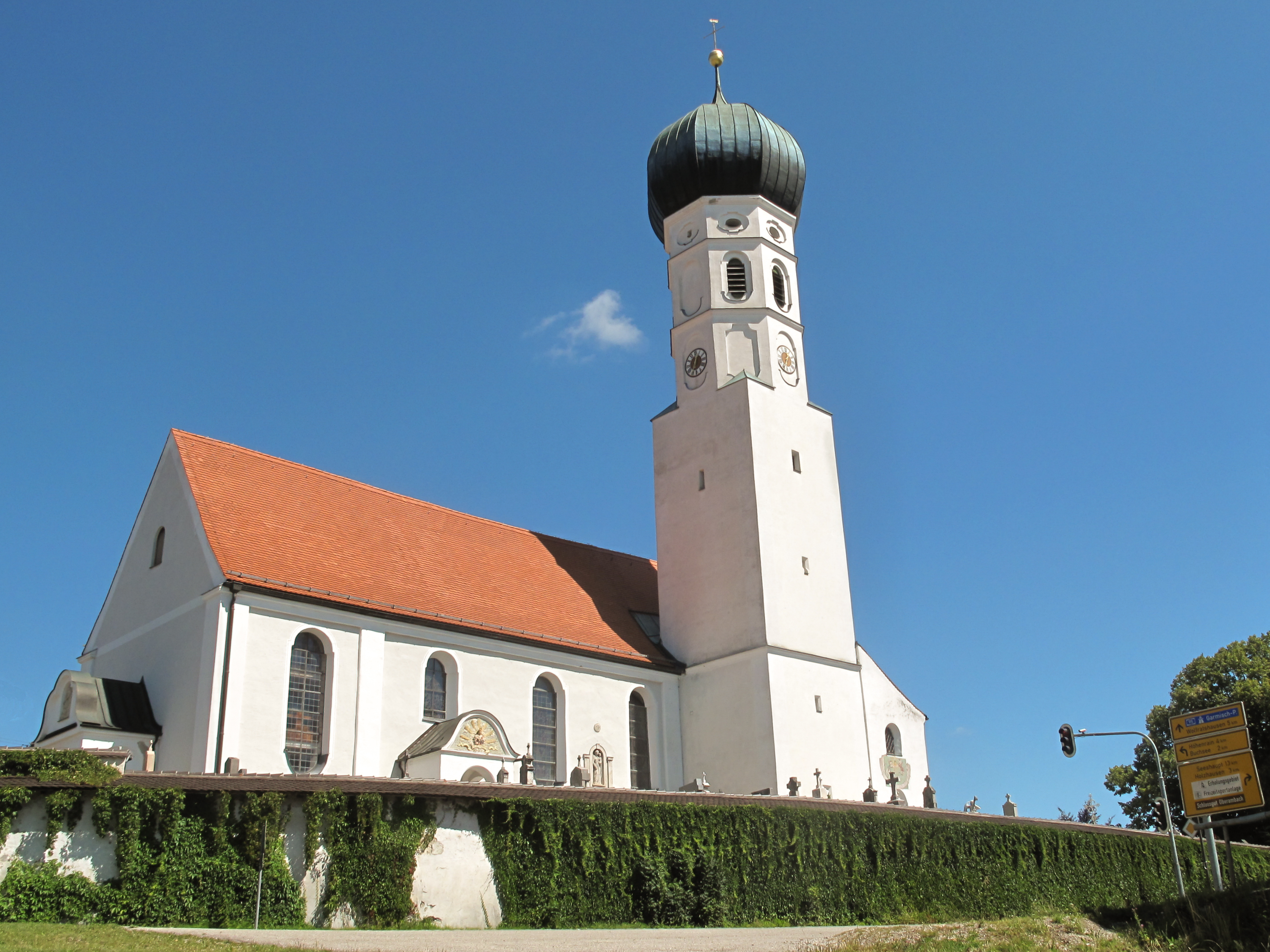
- Church of the Assumption of the Virgin Mary

- Coat of arms

- Location of Münsing within Bad Tölz-Wolfratshausen district
- Interactive map of Münsing
- Location within Germany Location within Bavaria
- Coordinates: 47°54′N 11°22′E
- Country: Germany
- State: Bavaria
- Admin. region: Oberbayern
- District: Bad Tölz-Wolfratshausen

Government
  - Mayor (2020–26): Michael Grasl (FW)

Area
  - Total: 52.20 km^{2} (20.15 sq mi)
- Elevation: 666 m (2,185 ft)

Population (2025-12-31)
  - Total: 4,457
  - Density: 85.38/km^{2} (221.1/sq mi)
- Time zone: UTC+01:00 (CET)
  - Summer (DST): UTC+02:00 (CEST)
- Postal codes: 82541
- Dialling codes: 08177
- Vehicle registration: TÖL, WOR
- Website: www.muensing.de

Münsing is a municipality in the district of Bad Tölz-Wolfratshausen in Bavaria in Germany.

Located in the Upper Bavarian district of Bad Tölz-Wolfratshausen, it borders Lake Starnberg to its west. Its municipal area extends from the shores of Lake Starnberg to the Münsinger Rücken, a ridge which rises between the lake and the Isar valley, and also includes the western Tischberg, which forms its southern crest. The eponymous village Münsing, is the seat of the municipal administration, which also contains the villages of Degerndorf, Ammerland, Ambach, Holzhausen am Starnberger See, and St. Heinrich.
