= Adelheid und ihre Mörder =

German comedy-drama television series

- Created by: Michael Baier
- Starring: Evelyn Hamann
- Country of origin: Germany
- Original language: German
- No. of seasons: 6
- No. of episodes: 65

Production
- Running time: 50 minutes
- Production company: neue deutsche Filmgesellschaft

Original release
- Network: Das Erste
- Release: January 7, 1993 – June 5, 2007

Adelheid und ihre Mörder (Adelheid and Her Murderers) was a German comedy-drama television series broadcast between 1993 and 2007 by Das Erste. 65, 50 minute episodes in six series were produced. Directors included Ulrich Stark (6 episodes, 1993-1996), Arend Agthe (6 episodes, 1998-1999), Claus-Michael Rhone (20 episodes, 1996-2001), Stephan Meyer (8 episodes, 2003-2005) and Stefan Bartmann (26 episodes, 2000-2007).

The series stars Evelyn Hamann as the titular Adelheid Möbius, a witty secretary working for the Kriminalpolizei in Hamburg. She has the habit of solving the murder case by herself while the "real" investigators are still groping in the dark. However, Adelheid commonly finds herself in great danger when she exposes the murderer, only to be rescued by her colleagues.

== See also ==
- List of German television series
