= Cartoon (TV series) =

- Presented by: Loriot
- Country of origin: Germany
- No. of episodes: 21

Original release
- Network: Deutsches Fernsehen
- Release: February 5, 1967 – December 25, 1972

Cartoon is a German television series, created by Vicco von Bülow.
