= Ödipussi =

1988 film

- Loriot as Paul Winkelmann
- Directed by: Loriot
- Written by: Vicco von Bülow
- Produced by: Horst Wendlandt; Günter Rohrbach
- Starring: Loriot; Evelyn Hamann; Katharina Brauren; Edda Seippel; Richard Lauffen
- Cinematography: Xaver Schwarzenberger
- Music by: Rolf A. Wilhelm
- Release date: 10 March 1988
- Running time: 88 minutes
- Country: West Germany
- Language: German

Ödipussi is a 1988 West German comedy film, written and directed by and also starring Loriot. It was the first of two feature films he directed, the other one being Pappa Ante Portas. The title is a pun on the Oedipus complex described by Sigmund Freud and the nickname "Pussi", the way the main protagonist is called by his mother throughout the film. Rumors that the title might also be a reference to the James Bond film Octopussy have been denied by Loriot.

== Synopsis ==
Paul Winkelmann runs the family's furniture and decoration business. Despite his age (he is 56 years old), he is still single and maintains a close relationship with his mother, who cooks for him and cannot understand that he now has his own apartment.

When he meets Margarethe Tietze, a practicing psychologist, the two attempt to join their expertise to better serve the potential furniture customers who have psychological troubles. After an afternoon of coffee and pastries and a business trip to Italy, Margarethe introduces Paul to her parents, who initially assume he is one of her patients. In the meantime, much to Paul's dislike, his jealous mother has found a lodger. Margarethe's family's return visit at Paul's mother's apartment ends with a debacle, but Paul and Margarethe nevertheless start a relationship.

== Premières in East and West Germany ==
The première of the movie was on March 10, 1988 at 16:00 in East Berlin and in the evening in the West. It was the first and only première in the divided Germany to happen in both parts of the country on the same day. In the Federal Republic the film was seen by 4,612,801 viewers.
