= Loriot =

German humorist (1923–2011)

Vicco von Bülow Loriot
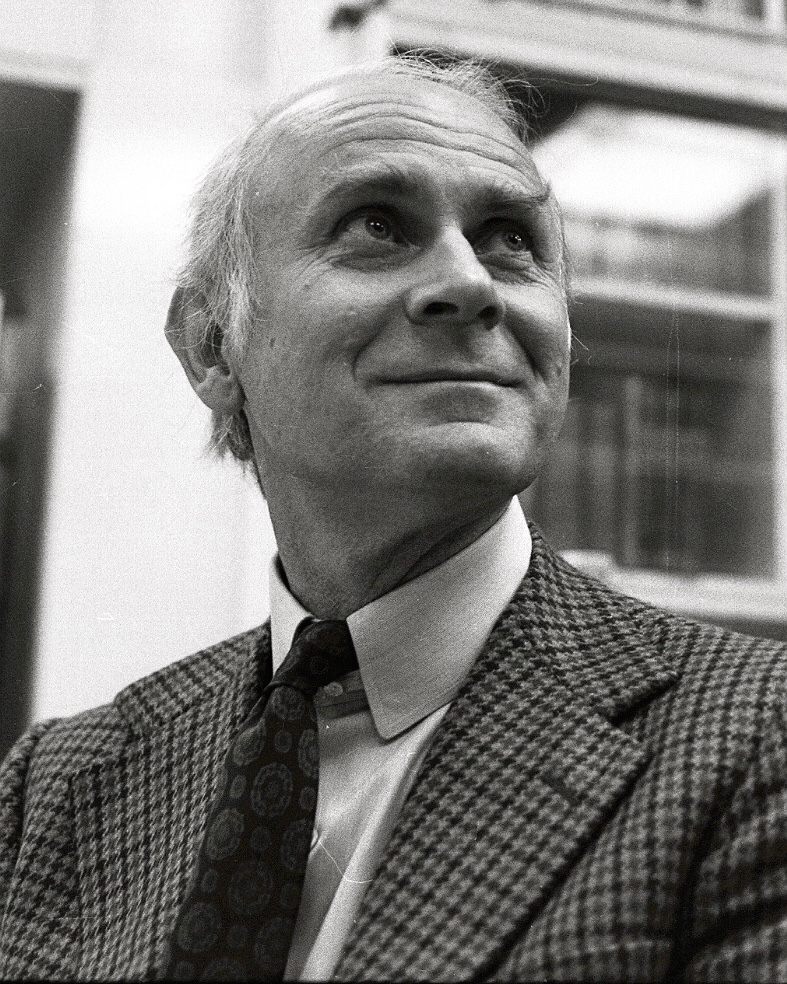
- Vicco von Bülow, 1971
- Born: Bernhard-Viktor Christoph-Carl von Bülow; 12 November 1923; Brandenburg an der Havel, Prussia, Weimar Republic
- Died: 22 August 2011 (aged 87); Ammerland at Lake Starnberg, Bavaria, Germany
- Known for: Ödipussi, Pappa Ante Portas

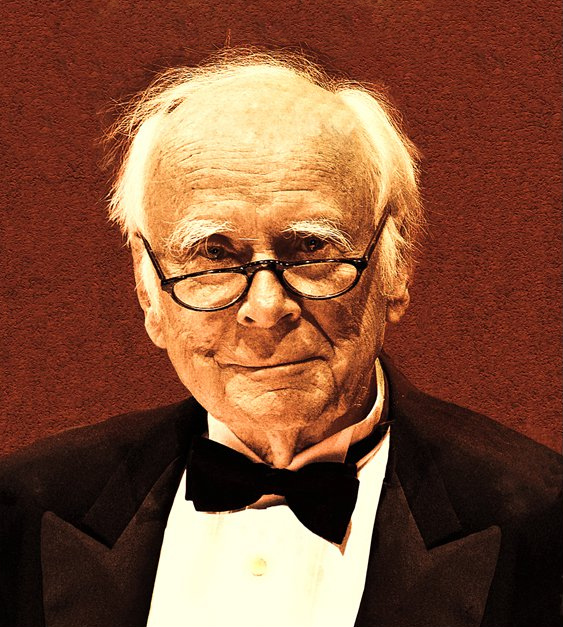
Von Bülow in 2010

Bernhard-Viktor Christoph-Carl von Bülow (12 November 1923 – 22 August 2011), known as Vicco von Bülow or Loriot (German: [loˈʁi̯oː]), was a German comedian, humorist, cartoonist, film director, actor and writer. As an artist, he was almost exclusively known under his pen name Loriot, which is the French term for the bird oriole depicted as a crest in the coat of arms of the Bülow family.

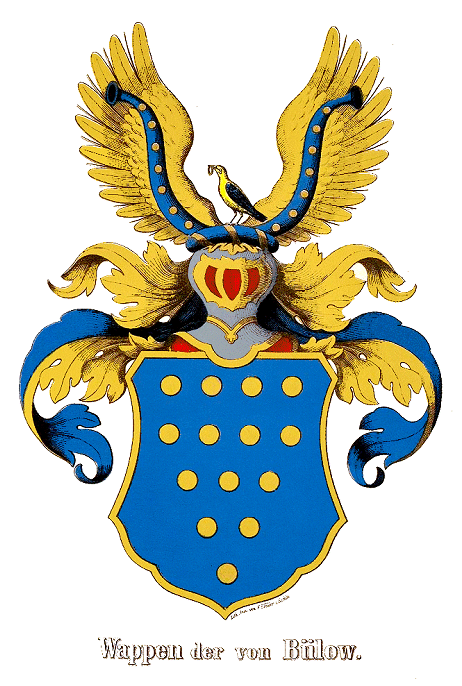
The eponymous bird

He was best known for his cartoons, the sketches from his 1976 television series Loriot, alongside Evelyn Hamann, and his two movies, Ödipussi (1988) and Pappa Ante Portas (1991).

On the television series Unsere Besten (Our Best), Loriot was ranked the 54th best German ever. In a special comedy episode of Unsere Besten, he was ranked as the most famous German comedian ever.

== Early and personal life ==
Vicco von Bülow was born in Brandenburg an der Havel in Prussia, today Brandenburg, in modern north-eastern Germany. The von Bülow family belongs to German aristocracy. His parents, Johann-Albrecht Wilhelm von Bülow (1899–1972) and Charlotte (née von Roeder, 1899–1929), separated soon after he was born, and his mother died when he was six. Von Bülow and his brother grew up in Berlin with their grandmother.

Von Bülow was still in school when World War II started. After graduating early from secondary school, he followed the family's tradition and became a military officer. He was deployed to the Eastern Front for three years, serving as Oberleutnant of Panzergrenadierregiment 3 in the 3rd Panzer Division. He was decorated with the Iron Cross 2nd class and 1st class. His younger brother, Johann-Albrecht Sigismund von Bülow, was killed on 21 March 1945, less than two months before the end of World War II. Asked during an interview later in his life if he had been a good soldier he answered: "Not good enough, otherwise I would have been part of the resistance on 20 July 1944. But for the dreadful German contribution to world history, I will be ashamed for the rest of my life."

Von Bülow completed his Abitur in 1946. In 1951 he married Romi Schlumbom (1929–2024), with whom he had two daughters.

== Artistic career ==
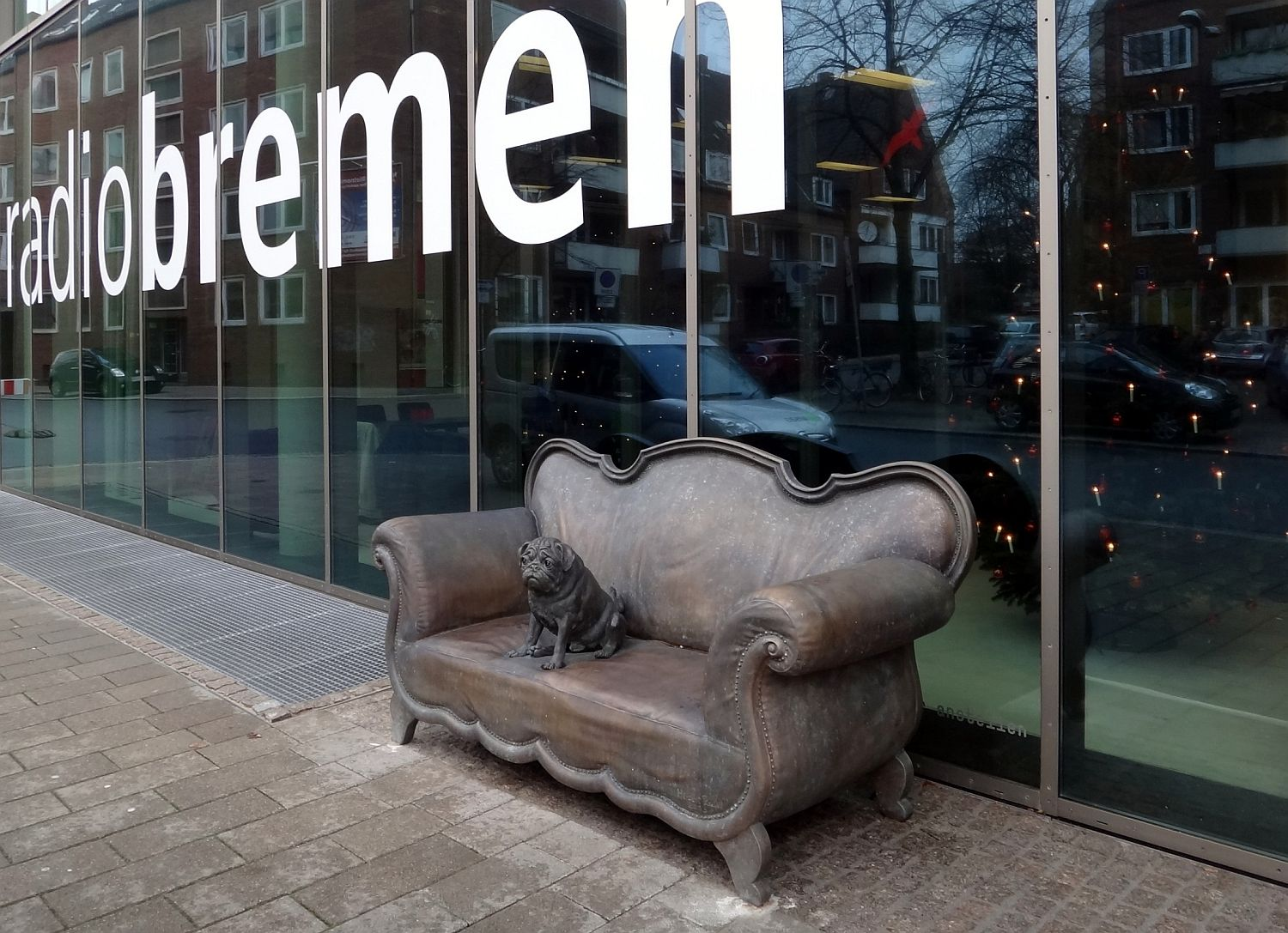
Loriot's famous sofa from Loriot, reproduced in bronze, outside the Radio Bremen headquarters

Von Bülow's talent for drawing was eminent already during his school years. After the war he studied graphic design and painting at the Landeskunstschule in Hamburg. From 1950 onwards, he published cartoons under the pseudonym "Loriot", derived from the French word for oriole, his family's heraldic animal.

In 1971, von Bülow created a cartoon dog named Wum, which he voice-acted himself. Wum became the mascot of Aktion Sorgenkind, a German humanitarian organization. During the Christmas season of 1972 Wum's song "Ich wünsch' mir 'ne kleine Miezekatze" ("I wish I had a little kittycat"), sung in sprechgesang style, became popular enough to remain in the top position of the German pop charts for nine weeks. Wum also appeared in the German show Der Große Preis (The Big Prize), where he appeared during breaks until the 1990s. Before long, Wum was accompanied by the elephant Wendelin, and later by Blauer Klaus (Blue Klaus), an alien hovering in with his flying saucer. Loriot wrote, drew and dubbed all of these skits by himself. Each cartoon ended with Loriot asking the viewers to take part in the TV lottery, which supported the "Aktion Sorgenkind". When the show was dropped, the adventures of Wum and Wendelin ended as well. Today, Wum and Wendelin appear on the last page of the TV magazine Gong.

The first episode of the German television comedy series Loriot was produced in 1976. In six episodes, Loriot presented sketches, usually being the protagonist himself, and short cartoons that he had drawn. Examples of sketches from the series include Der Lottogewinner ("The lottery winner"), Jodeldiplom ("yodeling diploma") and Englische Ansage ("English announcement").

Loriot had a love of classical music and opera. In 1982, he conducted the humorous gala concert for the 100th anniversary of the Berlin Philharmonic Orchestra. He is also related to the orchestra's history by kinship (Hans von Bülow, the first chief conductor of the orchestra, was distantly related to Loriot). His narrative version of Camille Saint-Saëns' The Carnival of the Animals was repeatedly performed by Loriot with the Scharoun Ensemble, a chamber music ensemble consisting of musicians of the Berlin Philharmonic Orchestra.

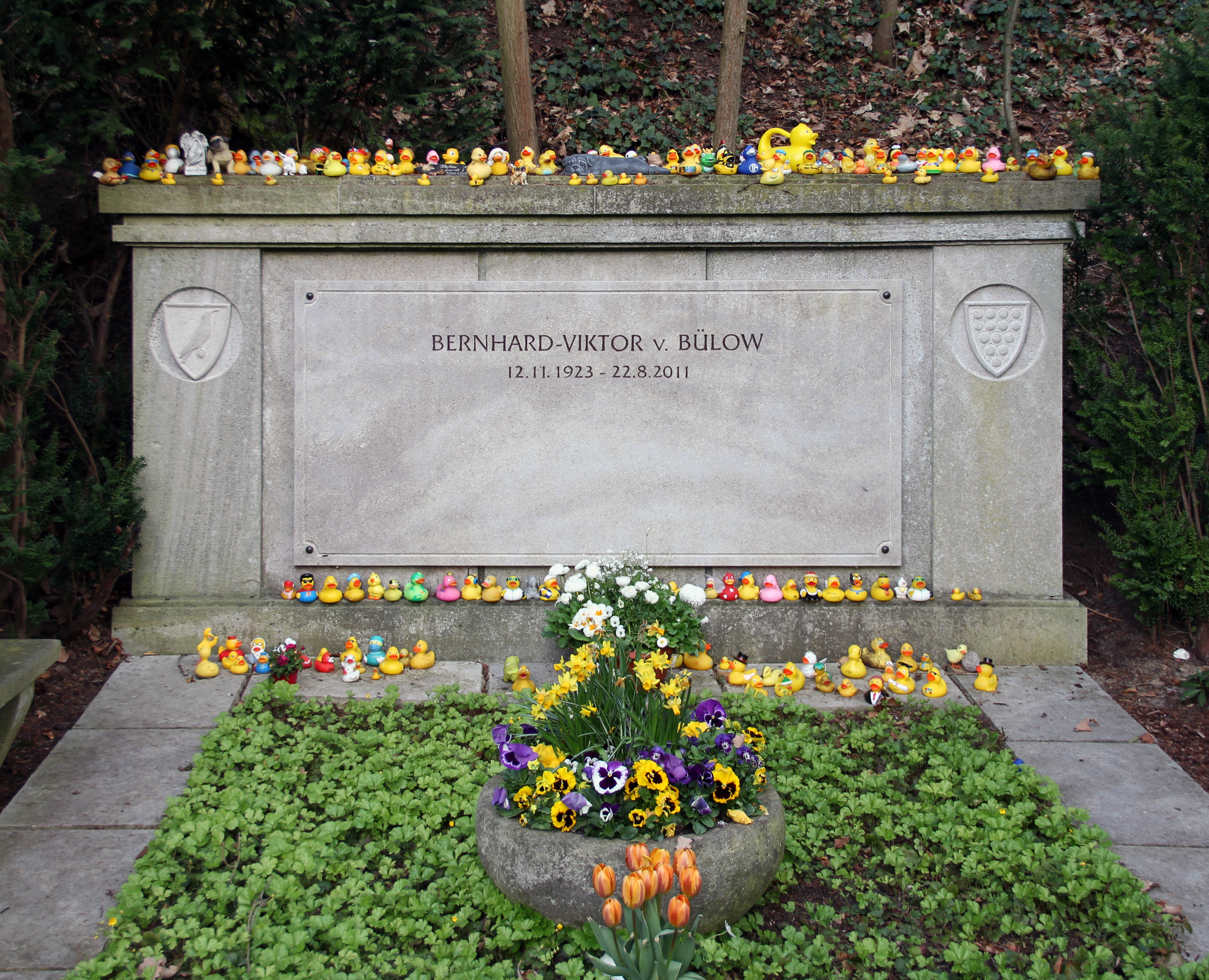
Gravestone of Loriot at Friedhof Heerstraße, Charlottenburg-Wilmersdorf, Berlin. Visitors have left rubber ducks on it in a tribute to one of Loriot's best-known sketches.

As a director, Loriot staged the operas Martha (Staatsoper Stuttgart, 1986) and Der Freischütz (Ludwigsburg, 1988). In 1983 Radio Bremen produced the broadcast "Loriot's 60th birthday" for the broadcast station ARD on the occasion of Loriot's 60th birthday. In 1988 he received the Bavarian Film Award, Special Prize, and in 1993 the Bavarian Film Award, Honorary Award.

Loriot was awarded an honorary doctorate by the University of Wuppertal in 2001. He is honorary citizen of his hometown of Brandenburg an der Havel and his chosen home of Münsing from 1993 until his death. Furthermore, Loriot was a member of the Bayerische Akademie der Schönen Künste since that same year and of the Berlin Academy of Arts since 1997. He became honorary professor of theatrical arts at the Berlin University of the Arts in June 2003. He received numerous awards for his performance in TV, movies and other disciplines. He died in Ammerland at Lake Starnberg of old age.

== Characteristics of his work ==
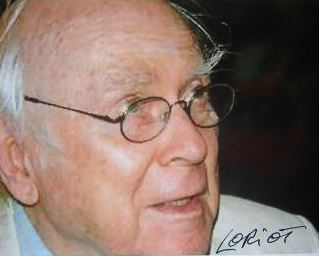
Von Bülow in 2005

His cartoons hinged on the contrast between the presented situation, the dignity displayed by his typically big nosed characters and the picture's caption. Inevitably one of these elements gets out of line, for example, when he combines the caption "We demand equal treatment of men and women, even if the suckling baby might temporarily lose weight." with the picture of a bulbous-nosed man breast-feeding a baby in a distinguished manner. The topics of his cartoons were mainly drawn from everyday life, scenes of the family and middle-class society. The same contrast between absurd situation and dignified behaviour of his characters could be seen in his various sketches and films.

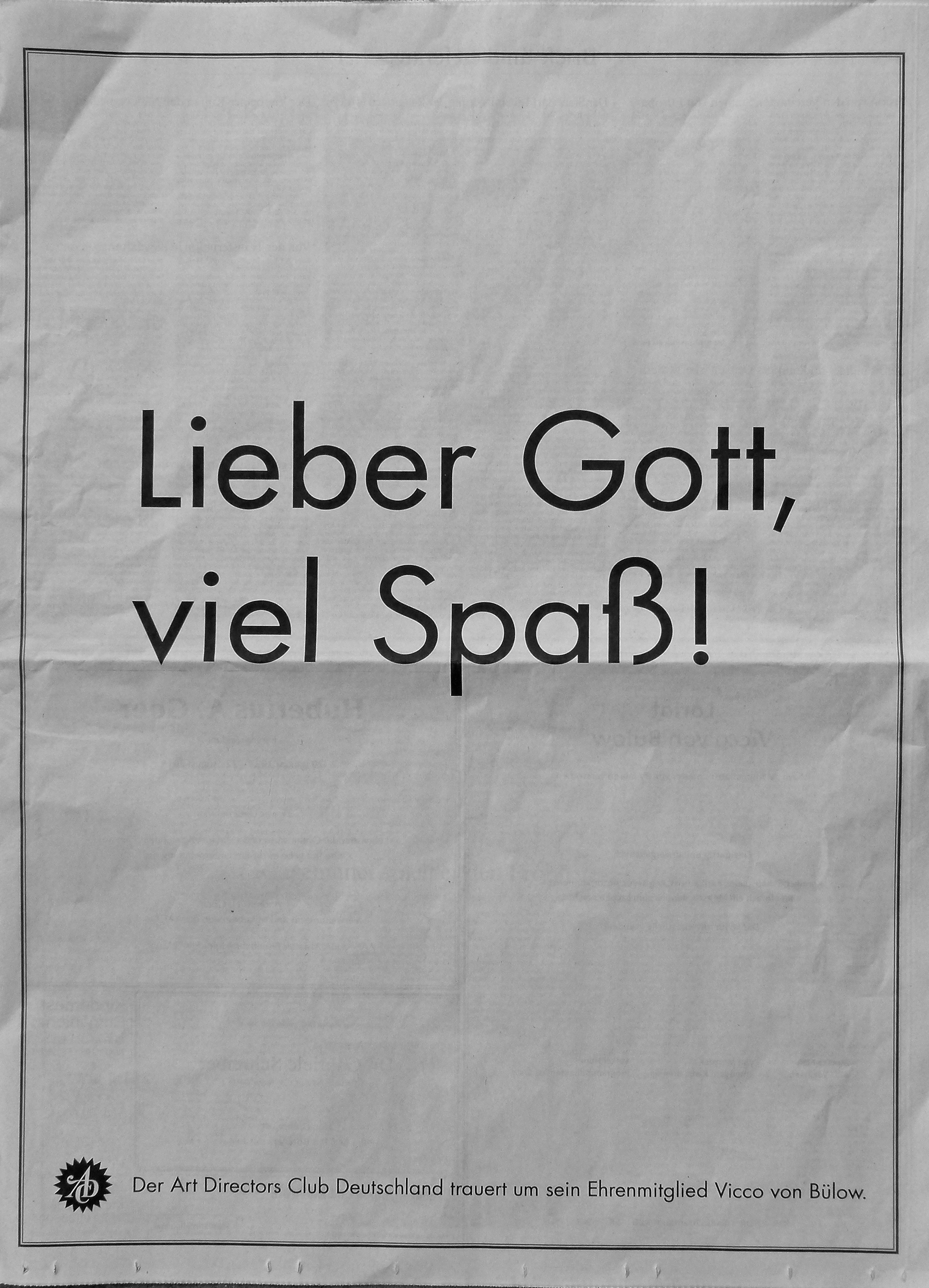
Obituary notice from the German division of the Art Directors Club, of which he was an honorary member, after his death. The German text means "Dear God, have fun!"

In the sketch "Zimmerverwüstung/Das schiefe Bild" (room destruction/the crooked painting) from the Loriot TV series of 1976, a maid offers a distinguished looking official – played by Loriot – who has just arrived on a house call a place in a finely furnished salon for a moment in order to let the house owners know. The person waiting looks at the furnishings from an armchair for a while. He then notices that a small oil painting hangs crooked. When he tries to correct this, he touches the adjacent painting which slides out of its frame. At nearly the same time, he accidentally throws something down from a table underneath the paintings. While reaching for it, he has to move a couch, the other end of which pushes a small table which tilts, and further items fall to the floor. In a slow chain reaction, every one of his attempts to bring things in order causes further and greater disorder in the room, including whole wall shelves breaking down. His relentless efforts to repair the damage cause further damage and ultimately result in the nearly complete devastation of the salon. Finally, the maid returns, and the last camera position is behind her who stands in the opened door, looking on the still intact fraction of the room. The official walks towards her and points in the direction of the painting, with an undertone of significance telling her: "The painting hangs crooked!" (German: "Das Bild hängt schief!").

What makes the above sketch typical for Loriot is not only the complete absurdity of the whole scene including the end, but that the character, while acting extremely clumsily, never loses his temper and keeps his dignity during the evolving catastrophe. The final remark is even spoken in an incidental manner, such as if the painting would indeed be the only problem in the room, baffling the viewer (while the reaction of the maid is not shown).

Loriot's enormous popularity, his accurate language, and high-brow sense of comedy led to the adoption of a large number of phrases and inventions from the series' sketches into German common knowledge and everyday speech. Among these are certainly the "yodeling diploma", a sentence like "With that," (said diploma) "you have something of your own!", "the "stone louse", but also remarks like, "Please ... don't talk right now.", "There used to be more tinsel!", "Look, a piano! A piano, a piano!" or the laconic, hardly translatable "Ach!?" ("Oh, is it?").

== Lawsuit of his daughter against the Wikimedia Foundation ==
External image
- The stamps in question

Pictures showing Loriot's signature and German semi-postal stamps with topics of Loriot's work that illustrated Loriot's entry in the German-language Wikipedia were removed by the Wikimedia Foundation on 8 November 2011. This action was prompted by an interim order forbidding Wikimedia to use these images, that had been initiated by an heiress, daughter Susanne von Bülow, at the Landgericht Berlin on 6 October 2011 after an email from the heiress requesting their removal had not been answered. Wikimedia had to pay the cost of the legal proceedings. The final court decision was announced on 27 March 2012; it upheld the interim order regarding the stamps, but overturned it for the signature. Wikimedia was ordered to pay 4/5 of the costs.

== Accolades and awards (selection) ==
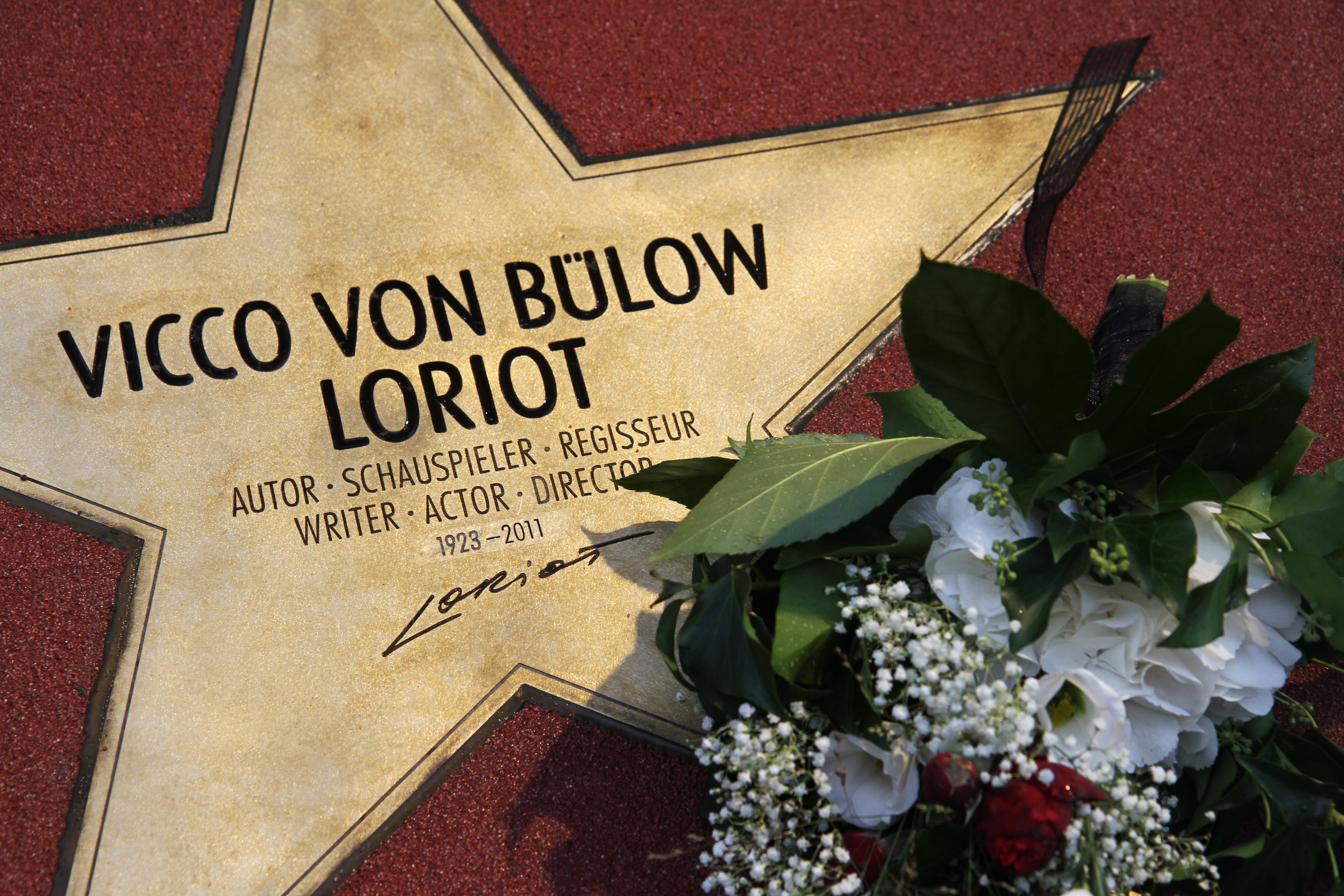
Star for Loriot on the Boulevard der Stars in Berlin, Potsdamer Platz

- 1943: Iron Cross 1st and 2nd Class
- 1968 & 1973: Adolf Grimme Award in silver
- 1973: Goldene Europa
- 1974: Great Cross of Merit of the Federal Republic of Germany
- 1974: Karl-Valentin Medal
- 1978: Goldene Kamera
- 1980: Bavarian Order of Merit
- 1985: Kassel Literary Prize
- 1988 & 1993: Bambi
- 1990: Order of Merit of Berlin
- 1993: Membership in the Bayerische Akademie der Schönen Künste
- 1993: Honorary citizenship of his native home town of Brandenburg an der Havel and his chosen home town of Münsing
- 1995: Bavarian Maximilian Order for Science and Art
- 1997: Membership in the Academy of Arts, Berlin
- 1998: Great Cross of Merit with Star of the Federal Republic of Germany
- 2001: Honorary degree from the University of Wuppertal
- 2003: Honorary professorship at the Berlin University of the Arts
- 2007: German Comedy Awards Honorary Award
- 2007: Wilhelm Busch Prize
- 2009: Honorary Award of the Deutsche Filmakademie
- 2009: Walk of Fame of Cabaret
- 2010: Honorary membership in the German Sociological Association
- 2011: Charity stamps of four well-known Loriot cartoons
- 2015: Hörzu readers' award for "greatest TV legend"

== Legacy ==
- 2023/2024 Exhibition Loriot 100, Caricatura Museum Frankfurt

== See also ==
- Studiointerview
