= MRS degree =

Pejorative slang term

An MRS Degree or M.R.S. Degree is a derogatory slang term in North American English for when a young woman attends college or university with the intention of finding a potential spouse, as opposed to pursuing academic achievement for a future career. The term derives from "Mrs.", a common honorific for married women, and its similarity to abbreviations for academic degrees, such as "M.S." for a Master of Science. It is a faux initialism, as it does not stand for anything individually even though its letters are pronounced individually when spoken aloud. The earliest use of the term was in 1860, but the term "MRS degree" was most commonly used during the mid 20th century in North America, a period of time when higher education became more accessible, yet the possibilities for women were still very limited. A similar concept exists in Spanish: taking an EMMC course (an acronym meaning "estudio mientras me caso", "I study while I get married").

== See also ==
- Sex discrimination in education
- Sexism in academia
