= Evelyn Hamann =

German actress

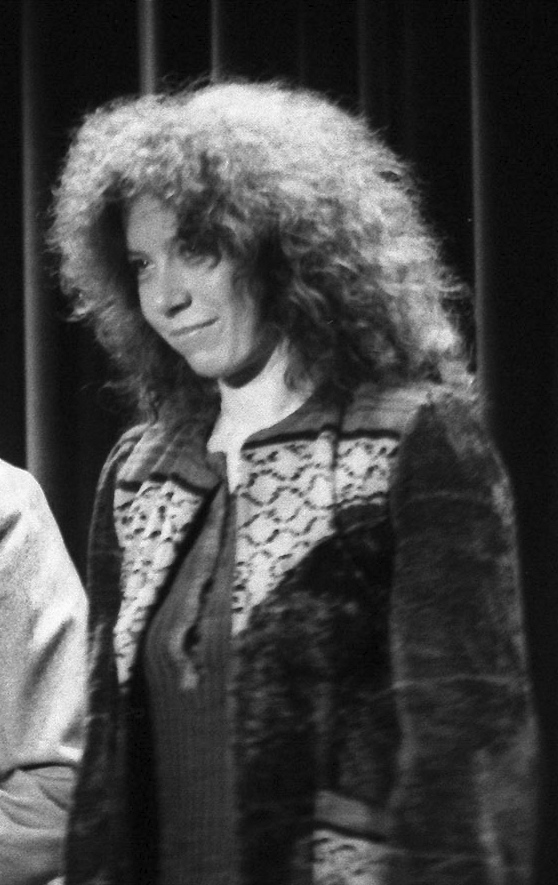
- Evelyn Hamann around 1980
- Born: 6 August 1942; Hamburg, Germany
- Died: 28 October 2007 (aged 65); Hamburg, Germany
- Occupation: Actress

Eveline Braun, (née Hamann; 6 August 1942 – 28 October 2007) commonly known as Evelyn Hamann, was a German actress best known for her work with popular German comedian Loriot as well as for her appearances in television series such as The Black Forest Clinic and Adelheid und ihre Mörder.

== Private life ==
She was born into a family of musicians in Hamburg, Germany. Her father Bernhard Hamann was a violinist, the concertmaster of the NDR symphony orchestra, and founder of the Hamann Quartet; her mother was a singer and music teacher, and her brother Gerhard was a professor of cello at the Trossingen School of Music. Evelyn Hamann liked to keep her private life out of the public eye, so little is known about her life off-camera. Between 1964 and 1976 she was married to Hans Walter Braun, whom she met while acting in Hamburg. After her divorce she lived with her partner, actor Stefan Behrens.

She died from lymphoma during the night of 28 to 29 October 2007 in Hamburg.

== Education and first work ==
After an acting course at Hamburg University of Music and the Performing Arts, where she was taught by Eduard Marks, among others, Hamann started a career on the stage. She took on small roles at the Thalia Theater, and from 1968 her stage career took her to Göttingen, Heidelberg and Bremen, where she played Marthe Schwertlein in Goethe's Urfaust.

== Acting career ==
From 1976 Evelyn Hamann featured in many comedy sketches in Loriot's television programmes, for example as TV announcer in Englische Ansage. Her comedic shtick often consisted of stiffly formal, deadpan reactions, even in the most absurd situations.

Hamann acted in Loriot's films Ödipussi (1987) and Pappa Ante Portas (1991). She also appeared in the film Piratensender Powerplay (1982) starring famous German entertainers Thomas Gottschalk and Mike Krüger.

Hamann appeared as housekeeper Karsta Michaelis in the television soap opera The Black Forest Clinic in the 1980s and later as Thea in medical drama Der Landarzt (The Country Doctor).

From 1992 to 2006 she played the title role in the ARD television series Adelheid und ihre Mörder (Adelheid and her murderers).

== Literary readings ==
Evelyn Hamann also read authors' works aloud at literary readings and narrated audiobooks, including Patricia Highsmith's crime thrillers.

== Selected filmography ==
=== Television ===
- 1976–1978: Loriot
- 1985–1989 – The Black Forest Clinic
- 1987 – Evelyn und die Männer
- 1987–1989: Der Landarzt
- 1989/1991/1992 – Der Millionenerbe
- 1989/1991/1992 – Kein pflegeleichter Fall
- 1991 – Glückliche Reise
- 1992 – Vater braucht eine Frau
- 1992–1999 – Evelyn Hamann Specials
- 1993–2005 – Evelyn Hamanns Geschichten aus dem Leben
- 1992–2006 – Adelheid und ihre Mörder
- 1995 – Das Traumschiff
- 1998 – Wut im Bauch
- 1999 – Ehe-Bruch

=== Film ===
- 1982 – Piratensender Powerplay
- 1987 – Ödipussi
- 1990 – Pappa ante Portas

== Awards ==
- 1977 – Goldene Kamera ("Best supporting role" with Loriot)
- 1987 – Goldene Kamera (3rd place for "Best Comedy" for "Evelyn und die Männer")
- 1993 – Order of Merit of the Federal Republic of Germany
- 1997 – Telestar "Best actress in a series" for "Adelheid und ihre Mörder"
- 1997 – Bayerischer Fernsehpreis "Best actress in a series" for "Adelheid und ihre Mörder"
- 1997 – Goldene Kamera
- 1998 – Honorary Superintendent of the Bavarian Police Force
- 2000 – Deutscher Videopreis (with Loriot)
- 2002 – Münchhausen Prize

== See also ==
- German television comedy
- List of German language comedians
