= Pappa Ante Portas =

1991 film

- Directed by: Loriot; Renate Westphal-Lorenz
- Written by: Loriot
- Produced by: Horst Wendlandt
- Starring: Evelyn Hamann; Loriot
- Cinematography: Gérard Vandenberg
- Edited by: Annette Dorn
- Music by: Rolf A. Wilhelm
- Distributed by: Tobis Filmkunst
- Release date: February 20, 1991
- Running time: 89 minutes
- Country: Germany
- Language: German

Pappa Ante Portas is a 1991 German comedy film directed by Loriot, who also played the leading role and wrote the script, and Renate Westphal-Lorenz. This was Loriot's second and final feature film, after 1988's Ödipussi.

== Synopsis ==
Heinrich Lohse is a manager at pipe manufacturing company "Deutsche Röhren AG" who increasingly tends to lose control. After ordering a 40-year supply of typewriting paper and erasers because of volume discount, his boss forces him to retire.

Confronted with this new situation, Lohse's family reacts in shock. It turns out Heinrich's wife Renate and his teenage son Dieter were quite comfortable with the absent husband and father and do not want to see their situation disrupted. Heinrich, however, refuses to allow his career to end and immediately begins to rearrange the Lohse household based on his questionable managerial skills. This leads to an increasingly bizarre series of conflicts with his wife, son, and friends.

At the supermarket, Heinrich orders dozens of packs of mustard (again for a bulk discount). Later, he orders the cleaning lady around like a company boss before getting drunk with her. He also becomes unwantingly the love attraction of two middle-aged sisters in the neighbourhood. Eventually, Heinrich goes on to invite a film crew to shoot a television series in the Lohse household. The more he tries to impress his wife, the worse it gets, and Renate seriously questions their marriage.

In the midst of their marital crisis, they attend the birthday party of Renate's mother. Renate's stuffy sister Hedwig and her husband Hellmuth initially present themselves as the perfect couple at the party, but then get into a heated argument. Watching this, Heinrich and Renate both accept their new situation and try to find satisfaction together again as a couple. They realise that although their marriage is not perfect, it could still be worse.

The last shot shows Heinrich and Renate playing a very amateurish recorder concert in their living room in front of their son Dieter and Mrs. Kleinert, their cleaning lady.

== Cast ==
- Loriot as Heinrich Lohse / Grandpa Hoppenstedt / Lothar Frohwein / violinist
- Evelyn Hamann as Renate Lohse
- Irm Hermann as Hedwig, Renate's sister
- Hans-Peter Korff as Hellmuth, Hedwig's husband
- Dagmar Biener as Brigitte Mielke, a neighbour
- Ortrud Beginnen as Gertrud Mielke, Brigitte's sister
- Inge Wolffberg as Mrs. Kleinert, cleaning lady
- Gerrit Schmidt-Foß as Dieter, the Lohses's son
- Hans-Helmut Müller as Ernst Drögel, chocolate manufacturer

== Background ==
The title "Pappa ante portas" alludes to Hannibal ante portas! ("Hannibal before the gates!"), an often-cited Roman call referring to Carthaginian commander Hannibal on his way to Rome to conquer it in 211 BC. Pappa is an alternative spelling of German "papa" (dad). Director Loriot said it would be a family's best-known call of fear and thus would fit perfectly with his story.

The film was shot at the Babelsberg Studios in Potsdam, with most outside scenes being shot in Berlin. The final scene in which the birthday party is held was shot at Ahlbeck Pier.

== Commercial success ==
Approximately 3.5 million people saw the film in movie theaters, making it the most successful German movie production in 1991. In the same year, due to its commercial success, the film received the 'Goldene Leinwand'.
