= Anna Abalkina =

Academic integrity researcher

- Awards: Nature's 10

Academic background
- Education: University of Perugia, Finance University under the Government of the Russian Federation

Anna Abalkina is a Russian academic, and is a research fellow at the Free University of Berlin. Abalkina researches scientific corruption and fraud, including 'paper mills' and hijacked journals. She was named by the journal Nature as one of ten people who shaped science in 2024.

== Academic career ==
Abalkina studied international economics at the Financial University in Moscow and then completed a PhD on Russian banks at the University of Perugia. Abalkina worked at LMU Munich, the World Bank and UN Trade and Development before joining the Institute for East European Studies at the Free University of Berlin as a research fellow.

Abalkina researches malpractice in academic publishing. Whilst working at the Financial University, Abalkina found two of her papers had been plagiarised by a student at another university. After she complained to the journal involved, the author was allowed to insert citations to Abalkina's work, rather than withdrawing the articles.

Since 2013, Abalkina has worked with the organisation Dissernet, which tracks plagiarism in Russian dissertations and published articles, and has identified thousands of fake degrees across hundreds of institutions.

In 2019, Abalkina identified a 'paper mill' called International Publisher LLC which sells authorships in papers, identifying more than 100 suspicious papers in 68 journals run by established publishers such as Elsevier and Wiley. More recently Abalkina has investigated hijacked journals, which is a type of impersonation cyberscam involving the setting up a site that mimics that of a genuine academic journal. Abalkina created a hijacked journal checking tool, which is hosted by Retraction Watch.

Abalkina's work has resulted in her being included on a Russian social media watchlist run by Roskomnadzor.

== Honours and awards ==
In 2023, Abalkina and co-author Dorothy Bishop received commendations from the Society for the Improvement of Psychological Science, for the article Paper mills: a novel form of publishing malpractice affecting psychology.

Abalkina was named by the journal Nature as one of ten people who shaped science in 2024.

== Selected works ==
- Bishop, Dorothy; Abalkin, Anna (2023). "Paper mills: a novel form of publishing malpractice affecting psychology". Meta-Psychology. 7. doi:10.15626/mp.2022.3422. Wikidata Q131532004.
- Abalkin, Anna (2023). "Publication and collaboration anomalies in academic papers originating from a paper mill: Evidence from a Russia-based paper mill". Learned Publishing. 36 (4). arXiv:2112.13322. doi:10.1002/leap.1574. Wikidata Q123437838.
- Abalkin, Anna; Libman, Aleksandr (2020). "The real costs of plagiarism: Russian governors, plagiarized PhD theses, and infrastructure in Russian regions". Scientometrics. 125 (3): 2793–2820. doi:10.1007/s11192-020-03716-x. Wikidata Q114263591.
- Abalkin, Anna (2021). "Detecting a network of hijacked journals by its archive". Scientometrics. 126 (8): 7123–7148. arXiv:2101.01224. doi:10.1007/s11192-021-04056-0. Wikidata Q114263270.
- Abalkina, Anna (4 February 2021). "Guest Post - Unethical Practices in Research and Publishing: Evidence from Russia". The Scholarly Kitchen.
