= Hack writer =

Writer who produces low-quality mass-appeal work

Hack writer is a pejorative term for a writer who is paid to write low-quality, rushed articles or books "to order", often with a short deadline. In fiction writing, a hack writer is paid to quickly write sensational, pulp fiction such as "true crime" novels or "bodice ripping" paperbacks. In journalism, a hack writer is deemed to operate as a "mercenary" or "pen for hire", expressing their client's political opinions in pamphlets or newspaper articles. Hack writers are usually paid by the number of words in their book or article; as a result, hack writing has a reputation for quantity taking precedence over quality.

== History ==
The term "hack writer" was first used in the 18th century, "when publishing was establishing itself as a business employing writers who could produce to order." The derivation of the term "hack" was a "shortening of hackney, which described a horse that was easy to ride and available for hire." In 1728, Alexander Pope wrote The Dunciad, which was a satire of "the Grub-street Race" of commercial writers who worked in Grub Street, a London district that was home to a bohemian counterculture of impoverished writers and poets. In the late 19th century, Anthony Trollope's novel The Way We Live Now (1875) depicts a female hack writer whose career was built on social connections rather than writing skill.

Many authors who would later become famous worked as low-paid hack writers early in their careers, or during a downturn in their fortunes. As a young man, Anton Chekhov had to support his family by writing short newspaper articles; Arthur Koestler penned a dubious Dictionary of Sexuality for the popular press; Samuel Beckett translated for the French Reader's Digest; and William Faulkner churned out Hollywood scripts.

A number of films have depicted hack writers, perhaps because the way these authors are "prostituting" their creative talents makes them an interesting character study. In the film adaptation of Carol Reed's The Third Man (1949), author Graham Greene added a hard-drinking hack writer named Holly Martins. In Jean-Luc Godard's film Contempt (1963), a hack screenwriter is paid to doctor a script. In the film Adaptation (2002), Nicolas Cage depicts an ill-educated character named Donald Kaufman who finds he has a knack for churning out cliché-filled film scripts.

== Use as a pejorative ==
In the US, the term "hack" is used as a pejorative description among writers, journalists, bloggers, and comedians. It is especially used for journalists who are perceived to take partisan sides.

The term "hack" has been used by some UK journalists as a form of humorous, self-deprecating self-description. The term was popularized in the UK by Private Eye magazine, which refers to journalists as "hacks." In earlier years, it also referred to female journalists as "hackettes."

== See also ==
- Concerto for Flute, Harp, and Orchestra (Mozart) -- the term as used by the critic Charles Rosen to describe what he perceived as a sharply inferior work by Wolfgang Amadeus Mozart
- Accreditation mill
- Author mill
- Brian Griffin
- Churnalism
- Content farm
- Essay mill, a ghostwriting service that provides university students with essays and term papers for a fee
- Ghostwriter, a writer who is paid to write books or articles that are credited to another person
- Vanity publishing
