= Research paper =

Research paper may refer to:

- Academic paper (also called scholarly paper), which is in academic journals and contains original research results or reviews existing results or shows a totally new invention
- Capstone project or synthesis project, is a hands-on project, essay, or other document submitted in support of a candidature for a degree or professional qualification, written in a professional writing format, presenting from the perspective of a professional in the field as opposed to the perspective of an academic researcher or student who typically use an academic writing format.
- Position paper, an essay that represents the author's opinion
- Term paper, is a type of research paper written by high school or college students to fulfill course requirements.
- Thesis or dissertation, a document submitted in support of a candidature for a degree or professional qualification, presenting the author's research and findings

== See also ==
- Academic publishing, the sub-field of publishing which distributes academic research and scholarship
- Academic writing, which is any writing assignment given in an academic setting
- Research paper mill
- Scientific writing, which reports original, empirical and theoretical work within a scientific field
- White paper
