= Academic mill =

In academia, a "mill" may refer to:

- Author mill
- Diploma mill
- Essay mill
- Paper mill

== See also ==
- Accreditation mill
