= Contract cheating =

Type of academic fraud

Contract cheating is a form of academic dishonesty in which students pay others to complete their coursework. The term was coined in a 2006 study by Thomas Lancaster and Robert Clarke as a more inclusive way to talk about all forms of academic work, as opposed to more outdated terms such as "term paper mill" or "essay mill", which refer to text-based academic outsourcing. In contrast, Lancaster and Clarke are computer scientists who found evidence of students systematically outsourcing coding assignments. Hence, they coined the term "contract cheating" to include all outsourced academic work, regardless of whether it is from text-based or non-text-based disciplines.

== Extent ==
The first published material detailing the extent of contract cheating was a study by Robert Clarke and Thomas Lancaster. The study presented three main findings:

1. Over 12 percent of postings on a popular website for outsourcing computer contract work were actually bid requests from students seeking contract cheating services.
2. Contract cheaters posted an average of 4–7 requests, suggesting that some students make habitual use of such services.
3. A smaller number of users have posted over 50 bid requests, including examples from multiple institutions. This suggests that these are agencies subcontracting work, not students who are directly making use of the services.

A 2007 study examined more than 900 examples of contract cheating by students studying computing subjects. The published results categorised the assignment types (e.g. programming, database, web design, etc.) and were analysed by country. One new concern identified by this study was the number of major projects (both final-year undergraduate and postgraduate) that had been posted on auction sites.

Research interest in contract cheating was significantly increased in the mid-2010s as a consequence of various scandals being reported in the media. For example, in 2014, Australian media exposed the MyMaster website, which provided custom-written assignments to hundreds of students.

In a 2017 meta-analysis of five studies, 3.5% of a total of 1,378 students reported having bought assignments to submit as their own. Of the students who reported engaging in contract cheating, more than 60% admitted to having done so more than once. A larger systematic review of 65 studies from 1978 to 2016 also found that 3.5% of students admitted to engaging in commercial contract cheating. Subsequently, a study of over 14,000 Australian students found that 5.8% of students engaged in one of five behaviours classified as contract cheating, with 2.2% submitting assessments completed by other people. However, a 2021 study argued that anonymous self-report surveys underestimate the extent of contract cheating, and using an incentivized truth-telling methods, it suggested that 7.9% of students buy and submit custom-written assignments while 11.4% submit assignments downloaded from file-sharing sites as their own.

A study was presented at the April 2012 STEM conference involving more than 600 assignments in subject areas ranging from anthropology to theology. There is debate about which subjects are most susceptible to contract cheating, but an overall consensus by several scholars, including Curtis & Clare (2017), Bretag (2017), Lancaster & Clarke (2015) and Eaton (2019), indicates that the following disciplines have the highest incidence:

1. Business
2. Engineering
3. Sciences (including pre-medicine and health sciences)
4. Humanities
5. Education

The commercial aspects of contract cheating were examined in a paper given at the 2013 Conference on Innovation and Technology in Computer Science Education. This paper analysed the monetary value of contract cheating to the various parties who play roles in the contract cheating process. The main analysis was based on a corpus consisting of 14,438 identified attempts to cheat, collected between March 2005 and July 2012.

Other prominent academic integrity scholars and experts include Tracey Bretag (Australia), Cath Ellis (Australia), and Sarah Elaine Eaton (Canada) and Irene Glendinning (UK).

In 2020, during the COVID-19 pandemic, increases in contract cheating were identified as being particularly problematic. Test and exam based assessments, which are typically conducted in invigilated halls, took place online as a social distancing measure; without the rigorous monitoring that is typically present in such assignments, opportunities for contract cheating over the Internet arose.

== Prevention ==
Assessment design strategies may help to prevent contract cheating from occurring. For example, individualized assessments have been shown to be effective against contract cheating.

In addition, some institutions have taken pro-active measures to block access to contract cheating companies websites from campus users. Since August 2022, Australia started blocking access to contract cheating sites nationally.

== Detection ==
In July 2007, Lancaster and Clarke proposed a systematic six-stage process that tutors can use to detect students who are contract cheating. Since then, additional research has been conducted with evidence now pointing to training for those who grade academic work being an important aspect of detection.

The quality of solutions to assignments sold by essay mills has been questioned, though other research claims that academic work obtained through the use of an auction site was of sufficient quality to gain satisfactory grades and thus remain undetected by educators. Contract cheating sites often boast that the use of their services is undetectable, however such claims have been refuted by empirical research that shows educators can be effectively trained to detect contract cheating in student work. There are now various resources available to educators to help train them on how to effectively identify contract cheating.

It has been proposed that existing assignment and invigilated assessment data can be systematically analyzed in order to detect patterns of students' performance that may be indicative of contract cheating. At the 2015 Plagiarism Across Europe and Beyond conference, it was demonstrated how collecting analytical data at the time of writing can help in identifying cases of contract cheating.

Although text-matching software is unlikely to detect contract cheating, such tools have shown some success in identifying the source of assignments found on auction sites.

== Policy and penalties ==
The way higher education institutions across the world address contract cheating is inconsistent. The UK and Australia have developed some of the world's most systematic approaches to addressing contract cheating through policies, quality assurance guidance, and corresponding penalties for students. Meanwhile, research and advocacy are underway in countries such as Canada, to promote better understanding of how universities and colleges can address the issue through policy measures.

Some academic institutions consider contract cheating to be among the most serious forms of academic misconduct and penalise culpable students accordingly. In 2010, the Academic Misconduct Benchmarking Research Project (AMBeR) developed a plagiarism tariff in the UK in an attempt to standardise penalties for all forms of academic misconduct. The final report noted that purchase of an assignment should be penalised with the most serious measures available, such as expulsion from the institution, and that many institutions consider contract cheating as a separate form of misconduct altogether because of the seemingly obvious intent associated with it. However, a 2015 UK research study that collected university students' opinions on appropriate penalties for academic misconduct demonstrated that students consistently recommended lenient penalties for plagiarism, and that this effect was most pronounced for contract cheating.

== Legality ==
The legal status of these services varies internationally. In 2020, it became illegal for third parties to provide academic work to students in Australia. In New Zealand it is illegal to "advertise or provide third party assistance to cheat".

In the United Kingdom, the Quality Assurance Agency published a report advocating the use of a legal approach as one way to tackle contract cheating, and suggested that existing fraud laws might be used, since the activities of such services, and their clients, could be reasonably interpreted to fit with definitions of fraud, as they involve false representation and failure to disclose information. A subsequent research project compared the UK fraud laws with the terms and conditions used by contract cheating services and concluded that such services would be unlikely to fall foul of fraud law because the disclaimers, terms and conditions the services provide generally state that any custom written products are to be used only as "study guides" or "revision aids", thereby placing responsibility and intent on the student client. In 2022, the Skills and Post-16 Education Act criminalised the provision of academic cheating services in England and Wales to students submitting work to English institutions—the unusual scope of this law relating to the devolved nature of the education competence in the United Kingdom. Ireland and Austria have also passed similar prohibitions.

Despite this, media stings have shown that companies can be complicit in the inappropriate use of these products. A similar analysis in Lithuania concluded that contract cheating services were unlikely to fall foul of existing laws, although an analysis of Australian law concluded that fraud, as well as forgery and conspiracy, might be legal avenues via which contract cheating could be targeted. All three studies called for the introduction of new legal approaches to tackle contract cheating. Contract cheating is not illegal in Canada.

A follow-up research study proposed new laws, based on the principle of strict liability, to lessen the requirement for prosecutors to demonstrate that contract cheaters intended to help students cheat, instead holding contract cheaters liable for prosecution simply for offering services that could be reasonably interpreted as being used for contract cheating. Scholars have noted that such laws have created a situation where generative AI and large language model providers may be caught within the scope of these criminal offences, particularly in England and Wales and in Australia.

More broadly, despite the apparent potential of a legal challenge to contract cheating companies, prosecutions are currently rare, largely because of the limitations of existing laws. In addition, the simple act of outlawing a service would not necessarily reduce demand for it; the aforementioned research studies all call for a holistic, multi-pronged approach to tackling contract cheating.

== See also ==
- Accreditation mill
- Author mill
- Diploma mill
- Ordination mill
- Research paper mill
