= Achal Agrawal =

Indian data scientist

- Born: India
- Education: Paris-Saclay University (Ph.D.)
- Known for: Founder of India Research Watch
- Awards: Nature's 10 (2025)
- Scientific career
- Fields: Applied mathematics, Data science, Research integrity, Scientometrics
- Workplaces: India Research Watch

Achal Agrawal is an Indian data scientist, applied mathematician, and research integrity advocate. He is the founder of India Research Watch, a volunteer-run non-profit organisation established in November 2022 to investigate and raise awareness about scientific misconduct in India. In 2025, he was named to Nature's 10, the journal Nature's annual list of people who shaped science.

== Education and Career ==
Agrawal received a Doctor of Philosophy in applied mathematics from the Paris-Saclay University in Orsay, France, in 2016. His doctoral research concerned coordination protocols and resource allocation in wireless communication networks. He returned to India in 2018 and worked as an academic in data science before founding the India Research Watch.

=== India Research Watch ===
Agrawal founded India Research Watch in November 2022 after an encounter with a student who had used paraphrasing software to repackage published work, an experience that prompted him to confront what he saw as widespread normalisation of research misconduct in Indian higher education

Utilizing public data repositories and the Retraction Watch database, Agrawal analyzed national publishing and retraction trends. His research demonstrated that India's retraction rate increased from 0.7 per 1,000 papers in 2014 to 4.8 per 1,000 in 2022. In 2024, Agrawal and collaborator Moumita Koley at the Indian Institute of Science flagged concerns that some universities may have been manipulating metrics used in the National Institutional Ranking Framework (NIRF). India Research Watch's advocacy is credited with contributing to a 2025 policy change by the NIRF to impose penalties on higher-education institutions with high numbers of retracted papers.
