= India Research Watch =

Indian academic organisation

IRW
- India Research Watch
- Abbreviation: IRW
- Formation: 2022
- Founder: Achal Agrawal
- Founded at: India
- Type: Non-profit organization
- Advisor: Sunil Mukhi
- Advisor: Subhash Chandra Lakhotia
- Advisor: Ganesh Natarajan
- Advisor: Shashi Kant Shankar
- Website: irw.co.in

India Research Watch (IRW) is a volunteer-run non-profit organization established in 2022 to combat scientific misconduct and research fraud in India. The group monitors cases of suspected research fraud, plagiarism, duplicate publication, data fabrication, and related malpractice reported anonymously.

== History ==
IRW was founded in 2022 by Achal Agrawal, a data scientist who earned a PhD in applied mathematics from Paris-Saclay University in 2016. Agrawal started IRW after observing extensive plagiarism among students and researchers. IRW describes its mission as identifying and addressing malpractices in Indian academia. In its early work, IRW analysed academic papers and launched anonymous tip lines to gather information on suspected misconduct.

As of July 2025, IRW members, comprising scientists, students, and data analysts from various institutions, investigate tips about suspect papers and flag issues publicly (mostly on PubPeer or social media) to pressure journals and universities to take disciplinary action. IRW and its founder, Achal Agrawal, were recognised by Nature's 10 in 2025.

== Activities ==
IRW published an article in The Hindu, on 17 November 2023, presenting data on a rising trend of scientific misconduct based on the Retraction Watch database.

For example, in 2023 IRW compiled data showing that 58 papers by Indian Institutes of Technology faculty had been retracted, for plagiarism or duplication, between 2006 and 2023. IRW has attributed India's rising research misconduct in part to pressure on institutions to climb university rankings such as NIRF, QS, and Times Higher Education, where output is measured largely by paper and citation counts.. In 2025, IRW's founder Achal Agrawal received a Digital Science Catalyst Grant to develop PostPub.. IRW has also highlighted how some Indian universities appear to manipulate institutional rankings by inflating publication and citation counts.

In 2024, Agrawal drew on the IRW database to criticize India's NIRF ranking methodology and its susceptibility to manipulation. Agrawal has also criticised alleged irregularities in NAAC's accreditation assessments. A 2025 Nature analysis identifying the institutions with the most retracted papers drew on IRW retraction-data work.

IRW's current work focuses on identifying AI-generated fabricated results and image manipulation in research by Indian academics.

== See also ==
- Publish or perish
- Academic careerism
- Scientific misconduct
