= MySchoolHelp =

Educational website

- Available in: English
- Founded: 2011

MySchoolHelp was a website for online collaboration between school students, created by Ben Lang. Lang was a 17-year-old high school student when he created the site.

A Forbes column on ethics in the classroom used MySchoolHelp as an example of a potentially problematic tool in the context of "the increasingly grey area of academic integrity". The Stuyvesant High School student newspaper, the Stuyvesant Spectator, raised similar questions.
