= OmniScriptum =

German publishing group

Omniscriptum Publishing
- Available in: English, German, Spanish, Russian, French
- Founded: 2002
- Headquarters: Chișinău, {{{location_country}}}
- Area served: Worldwide
- Founder: Wolfgang Philipp Müller
- Key people: Ieva Konstantinova (CEO)
- Industry: Publishing
- Employees: 200 (2018)
- Subsidiaries: Publishing houses: VDM Verlag Dr. Müller, LAP Lambert Academic Publishing, Palmarium Academic Publishing, Südwestdeutscher Verlag für Hochschulschriften, Verlag Classic Edition, EUE Editions Universitaires Européennes, Doyen Verlag, Fromm Verlag, Saarbrücker Verlag für Rechtswissenschaften
- Website: www.omniscriptum.com

Omniscriptum Publishing Group, formerly known as VDM Verlag Dr. Müller, is a German publishing group headquartered in Chișinău, Moldova. Founded in 2002 in Düsseldorf, its book production is based on print-to-order technology.

The company publishes theses, research notes, and dissertations through its e-commerce bookstores. The Norwegian Scientific Index lists both Omniscriptum (as Verlag Dr. Müller) and its subsidiary Lambert Academic Publishing are designated as failing to qualify as academic. (Note: This is seen from their Nivå ('Level') of 0, year after year. By contrast, Elsevier qualifies ("1"); Cambridge University Press qualifies with distinction ("2").) Lambert Academic Publishing has also been described as the "most dominating" among "predatory publishers that seek out authors of new theses", a vanity press which does "not apply the basic standards of academic publishing such as peer-review, editorial or proof-reading processes".

The company also offers print-to order publishing for fiction authors. It previously specialized in publishing and selling Wikipedia articles, but has stated that the practice of publishing Wikipedia content ended in 2013.

== History ==
The group's first publishing house was founded in Düsseldorf in 2002 by Wolfgang Philipp Müller and relocated to Saarbrücken in August 2005. The Mauritian office was established in April 2007 and was managed from 2008 up until May 2011 by David Benoit Novel, followed by Reezwan Ghanty.

In 2007, the group began distributing its publications through Lightning Source, Amazon, and the German company Books on Demand.

== Products and services ==
Omniscriptum specializes in German, Russian, Spanish, French, and English dissertations, theses, and research projects. Its business model involves a team of acquisitions editors who search the internet for academic authors and invite them to submit their manuscripts. The editorial team sends emails to people who have written a master's thesis or doctoral dissertation and whose college library has a web-accessible catalog.

In April 2010, Omniscriptum founded an imprint devoted to religion, spirituality, and Christian theology: Fromm Verlag. In October 2010 Dictus Publishing was launched to publish political texts related to the European Union.

=== Business practices ===
Omniscriptum's business practices have been questioned for profiting from the sale of unacclaimed works. In November 2009, an article in the newspaper Berner Zeitung faulted Omniscriptum for not disclosing that the books it was publishing were academic dissertations and for charging high prices. American writer Victoria Strauss characterized OMS as "an academic author mill", while Pagan Kennedy notes that OMS's practices are comparable to a form of kudzu weed proliferation in book publishing.

In January 2011, German professor Debora Weber-Wulff, in Copy, Shake, and Paste (a blog about plagiarism and scientific misconduct), referred to OMS as a spam publisher.

== Wikipedia content duplication ==
Branches of the company, including Alphascript Publishing (April 2009), Betascript Publishing (January 2010), Fastbook Publishing (July 2009), and Doyen Verlag, have published books consisting of compilations of Wikipedia articles. These books have been purchased or acquired by various libraries and academic institutions in Europe and Asia.

History of Ghana: a collection of Wikipedia articles published as a book

The titles were published as edited by Frederic P. Miller, Agnes F. Vandome, and John McBrewster, who are listed as authors. As of 21 December 2011, 180,818 titles were listed on the OMS bookshop. Betascript lists Lambert M. Surhone, Miriam T. Timpledon, Susan F. Marseken, Mariam T. Tennoe, and Susan F. Henssonow as editors, giving an additional 356,765 titles as of 21 December 2011.

Regarding its publishing, Alphascript asserted that: "There is hardly another platform for quick and better processing of information than Wikipedia" for customers "who want to be informed on a specific subject" in book form, though they can "have online everything free of charge".

Omniscriptum has edited 22,000 works.

According to the company, the last compilation of Wikipedia articles was published in 2013. The company stated that it stopped the practice of publishing Wikipedia content in order to focus on "original academic (and) special interest authors."

== See also ==
- Alphascript Publishing book by Miller FP, Vandome AF, McBrewster J: a scanned example
- Books LLC
- Ingram Content Group
- Philip M. Parker
- Print on demand
