= Wiley (publisher) =

American multinational publishing company

- Status: Active
- Traded as: NYSE: WLY (Class A); NYSE: WLYB (Class B); S&P 600 component (WLY)
- Founded: 1807; 219 years ago New York City, United States
- Founder: Charles Wiley
- Country of origin: United States
- Headquarters location: Hoboken, New Jersey, U.S.
- Distribution: Worldwide
- Nonfiction topics: Science; technology; medicine; professional development; higher education
- Revenue: ▼US$1.87 billion (2024)
- No. of employees: 6,400 (2024)
- Official website: www.wiley.com

John Wiley & Sons, Inc., commonly known as Wiley (/ˈwaɪli/), is an American multinational publishing company which focuses on academic publishing and instructional materials. The company was founded in 1807 and produces books, journals, and encyclopedias, in print and electronically, as well as online products and services, training materials, and educational materials for undergraduate, graduate, and continuing education students.

== History ==
The Hoboken, New Jersey, headquarters of Wiley

The company was established in 1807 when Charles Wiley opened a print shop in Manhattan. The company was the publisher of 19th-century American literary figures like James Fenimore Cooper, Washington Irving, Herman Melville, and Edgar Allan Poe, as well as of legal, religious, and other non-fiction titles. The firm took its current name in 1865. Wiley later shifted its focus to scientific, technical, and engineering subject areas, abandoning its literary interests.

Wiley's son John (born in Flatbush in Brooklyn, New York City, on October 4, 1808; died in East Orange, New Jersey, on February 21, 1891) took over the business when Charles Wiley died in 1826. The firm was successively named Wiley, Lane & Co., next Wiley & Putnam, and then John Wiley. The company acquired its present name in 1876, when John's second son William H. Wiley joined his brother Charles in the business. Through the 20th century, the company expanded its publishing activities, the sciences, and higher education.

In 1960 Wiley set up a European branch in London, which later moved to Chichester, England. In 1982, Wiley acquired the publishing operations of the British firm Heyden & Son. In 1989, Wiley acquired the life science publisher Liss. In 1996, Wiley acquired the German technical publisher VCH.

In 1997, Wiley acquired the professional publisher Van Nostrand Reinhold (the successor to the company started by David Van Nostrand) from Thomson Learning. In 1999, Wiley acquired the professional publisher Jossey-Bass from Pearson.

In 2001, Wiley acquired the publisher Hungry Minds (formerly IDG Books, including most titles formerly published by Macmillan General Reference) from International Data Group. In 2005, Wiley acquired the British medical publisher Whurr.

Wiley marked its bicentennial in 2007. In conjunction with the anniversary, the company published Knowledge for Generations: Wiley and the Global Publishing Industry, 1807–2007, depicting Wiley's role in the evolution of publishing against a social, cultural, and economic backdrop. Wiley has also created an online community called Wiley Living History, offering excerpts from Knowledge for Generations and a forum for visitors and Wiley employees to post their comments and anecdotes. In 2021, Wiley acquired Hindawi and J&J Editorial.

In 2023, Academic Partnerships acquired Wiley's online education business for $150 million.

=== Emerging markets ===
In December 2010, Wiley opened an office in Dubai. Wiley established publishing operations in India in 2006 (though it has had a sales presence since 1966), and has established a presence in North Africa through sales contracts with academic institutions in Tunisia, Libya, and Egypt. Wiley Brasil Editora LTDA in São Paulo, Brazil, was established in 2012.

=== Acquisitions ===
Wiley acquired Blackwell Publishing in February 2007 for US$1.12 billion. The combined business, named Scientific, Technical, Medical, and Scholarly (also known as Wiley-Blackwell), publishes, in print and online, 1,600 scholarly peer-reviewed journals and an extensive collection of books, reference works, databases, and laboratory manuals in the life and physical sciences, medicine and allied health, engineering, the humanities, and the social sciences.

Through a backfile initiative completed in 2007, 8.2 million pages of journal content have been made available online, a collection dating back to 1799. Wiley-Blackwell also publishes on behalf of about 700 professional and scholarly societies; among them are the American Cancer Society (ACS), for which it publishes Cancer, the flagship ACS journal; the Sigma Theta Tau International Honor Society of Nursing; and the American Anthropological Association. Other journals published include Angewandte Chemie, Advanced Materials, Hepatology, International Finance and Liver Transplantation.

Wiley Interscience was launched in 1997. It provided online access to Wiley journals, reference works, and books, including backfile content. Journals previously from Blackwell Publishing were available online from Blackwell Synergy until they were integrated into Wiley Interscience on June 30, 2008. In December 2007, Wiley also began distributing its technical titles through the Safari Books Online e-reference service. Interscience was supplanted by Wiley Online Library in 2010.

Wiley acquired Inscape Holdings Inc. in 2012, to provide DISC assessments and training for interpersonal business skills. A month later, Wiley announced its intention to divest assets in the areas of travel (including the Frommer's brand), culinary, general interest, nautical, pets, and crafts, as well as the Webster's New World and CliffsNotes brands. The planned divestiture was aligned with Wiley's "increased strategic focus on content and services for research, learning, and professional practices, and on lifelong learning through digital technology". In May 2012, the company acquired publishing company Harlan Davidson, Inc., which is a family-owned business based in Illinois. On August 13 of the same year, Wiley announced it entered into a definitive agreement to sell all of its travel assets, including all of its interests in the Frommer's brand, to Google Inc. On November 6, 2012, Houghton Mifflin Harcourt acquired Wiley's cookbooks, dictionaries and study guides. In 2013, Wiley sold its pets, crafts and general interest lines to Turner Publishing Company and its nautical line to Fernhurst Books. HarperCollins acquired parts of Wiley Canada's trade operations in 2013; the remaining Canadian trade operations were merged into Wiley U.S. In 2021, Wiley acquired eJournalPress (EJP), a company developing web-based applications for scholarly publishing.

In 2019, Wiley acquired the assets of Knewton, an adaptive learning company, for less than $17 million.

In 2021, Wiley acquired Hindawi, an open access journals publishing firm, for $298 million in cash. Wiley kept Hindawi's journals under their original brand name. In 2023, over 8000 articles from paper mills are retracted in numerous Hindawi journals. Wiley ceased using the Hindawi brand that same year, with the brand's 200 remaining journals marketed with the Wiley brand. The Wiley CEO who initiated the Hindawi acquisition stepped down thereafter. As of April 2024, Wiley's journals receive about 10,000 monthly manuscript submissions, and 10–13% of those are flagged as fictitious (e.g., from a paper mill).

== Products ==
=== Brands and partnerships ===
The old logo of Sybex, a Wiley brand of computer books

Wiley's Professional Development brands include For Dummies, Jossey-Bass, Pfeiffer, Wrox Press, J.K. Lasser, Sybex, Fisher Investments Press, and Bloomberg Press. The STMS business is also known as Wiley-Blackwell, formed following the acquisition of Blackwell Publishing in February 2007. Brands include The Cochrane Library and more than 1,500 journals.

Wiley-Blackwell offers journal publishing services for other organizations, some of them are American Cancer Society and The Physiological Society. Wiley, along with other publishers, created CourseSmart as an online retailer selling college textbooks as eBooks.

In 2016, Wiley launched a worldwide partnership with Christian H. Cooper to create a program for candidates taking the Financial Risk Manager exam offered by the Global Association of Risk Professionals. The program will be built on the existing Wiley efficient learning platform and Christian's legacy Financial Risk Manager product. The partnership is built on the view the FRM designation will rapidly grow to be one of the premier financial designations for practitioners that will track the growth of the Chartered Financial Analyst designation. The program will serve tens of thousands of FRM candidates worldwide and is based on the adaptive learning technology of Wiley's efficient learning platform and Christian's unique writing style and legacy book series.

With the integration of digital technology and the traditional print medium, Wiley has stated that in the near future its customers will be able to search across all its content regardless of original medium and assemble a custom product in the format of choice. Web resources are also enabling new types of publisher-customer interactions within the company's various businesses.

=== Open access ===
In 2016, Wiley began a collaboration with the open access publisher Hindawi to help convert nine Wiley journals to full open access. In 2018 a further announcement was made indicating that the Wiley-Hindawi collaboration would launch an additional four new fully open access journals. In 2023, over 8000 fictitious academic papers were retracted from Hindawi journals. As of April 2024, about 10% of all manuscript submissions Wiley received are flagged as fictitious.

On January 18, 2019, Wiley signed a contract with Project DEAL to begin open access to its academic journals for more than 700 academic institutions. It is the first contract between a publisher and a leading research nation (Germany) toward open access to scientific research.

=== Higher education ===
Higher Education's "WileyPLUS" is an online product that combines electronic versions of texts with media resources and tools for instructors and students. It is intended to provide a single source from which instructors can manage their courses, create presentations, and assign and grade homework and tests; students can receive hints and explanations as they work on homework, and link back to relevant sections of the text.

"Wiley Custom Select" launched in February 2009 as a custom textbook system allowing instructors to combine content from different Wiley textbooks and lab manuals and add in their own material. The company has begun to make content from its STMS business available to instructors through the system, with content from its Professional/Trade business to follow.

In September 2019, Wiley entered into a collaboration with IIM Lucknow to offer analytics courses for finance executives.

=== Online program management ===
In November 2011, Wiley Education Services announced the purchase Deltak for $220 million. Wiley later acquired The Learning House in 2018. This made Wiley one of the largest online program manager (OPM) providers at the time, with 60 university partners and more than 700 online programs.

In June 2023, Wiley announced that they would divest several business units, including Wiley University Services. Wiley's 2023 full year revenue was $208 million, an 8% reduction from the prior year. In 2020, Wiley reported $232 million in OPM revenue with organic growth of 11% compared to prior year. In November 2023, Academic Partnerships announced they would purchase Wiley's OPM business for $110 million.

=== Medicine ===
In January 2008, Wiley launched a new version of its evidence-based medicine (EBM) product, InfoPOEMs with InfoRetriever, under the name Essential Evidence Plus, providing primary-care clinicians with point-of-care access to the most extensive source of EBM information via their PDAs/handheld devices and desktop computers. Essential Evidence Plus includes the InfoPOEMs daily EBM content alerting service and two new content resources—EBM Guidelines, a collection of practice guidelines, evidence summaries, and images, and e-Essential Evidence, a reference for general practitioners, nurses, and physician assistants providing first-contact care.

=== Architecture and design ===
In October 2008, Wiley launched a new online service providing continuing education units (CEU) and professional development hour (PDH) credits to architects and designers. The initial courses are adapted from Wiley books, extending their reach into the digital space. Wiley is an accredited AIA continuing education provider.

=== Wiley Online Library ===
Wiley Online Library is a subscription-based library of John Wiley & Sons that launched on August 7, 2010, replacing Wiley Interscience. It is a collection of online resources covering life, health, and physical sciences as well as social science and the humanities. To its members, Wiley Online Library delivers access to over 4 million articles from 1,600 journals, more than 22,000 books, and hundreds of reference works, laboratory protocols, and databases from John Wiley & Sons and its imprints, including Wiley-Blackwell, Wiley-VCH, and Jossey-Bass. The online library is implemented on top of the Literatum platform, developed by Atypon which Wiley acquired in 2016.

== Corporate structure ==
=== Governance and operations ===
While the company is led by an independent management team and Board of Directors, the involvement of the Wiley family is ongoing, with sixth-generation members (and siblings) Peter Booth Wiley as the non-executive chairman of the board and Bradford Wiley II as a Director and past chairman of the board. Seventh-generation members Jesse and Nate Wiley work in the company's Professional/Trade and Scientific, Technical, Medical, and Scholarly businesses, respectively.

Wiley has been publicly owned since 1962, and listed on the New York Stock Exchange since 1995; its stock is traded under the symbols NYSE: WLY (for its Class A stock) and NYSE: WLYB (for its class B stock).

Wiley's operations are organized into three business divisions:

- Scientific, Technical, Medical, and Scholarly (STMS), also known as Wiley-Blackwell
- Professional Development
- Global Education

The company has approximately 10,000 employees worldwide, with headquarters in Hoboken, New Jersey, since 2002.

=== Corporate culture ===
In 2008, Wiley was named for the second consecutive year to Forbes magazine's annual list of the "400 Best Big Companies in America". In 2007, Book Business magazine cited Wiley as "One of the 20 Best Book Publishing Companies to Work For". For two consecutive years, 2006 and 2005, Fortune magazine named Wiley one of the "100 Best Companies to Work For". Wiley Canada was named to Canadian Business magazine's 2006 list of "Best Workplaces in Canada", and Wiley Australia has received the Australian government's "Employer of Choice for Women" citation every year since its inception in 2001. In 2004, Wiley was named to the U.S. Environmental Protection Agency's "Best Workplaces for Commuters" list. Working Mother magazine in 2003 listed Wiley as one of the "100 Best Companies for Working Mothers", and that same year, the company received the Enterprise Award from the New Jersey Business & Industry Association in recognition of its contribution to the state's economic growth. In 1998, Financial Times selected Wiley as one of the "most respected companies" with a "strong and well thought out strategy" in its global survey of CEOs.

In August 2009, the company announced a proposed reduction of Wiley-Blackwell staff in content management operations in the UK and Australia by approximately 60, in conjunction with an increase of staff in Asia. In March 2010, it announced a similar reorganization of its Wiley-Blackwell central marketing operations that would lay off approximately 40 employees. The company's position was that the primary goal of this restructuring was to increase workflow efficiency. In June 2012, it announced the proposed closing of its Edinburgh facility in June 2013 with the intention of relocating journal content management activities currently performed there to Oxford and Asia. The move would lay off approximately 50 employees.

Wiley is a signatory of the SDG Publishers Compact, and has taken steps to support the achievement of the Sustainable Development Goals (SDGs) in the publishing industry. These include becoming carbon neutral and supporting reforestation. Wiley's Natural Resources Forum was one of six out of 100 journals to receive the highest possible "Five Wheel" impact rating from an SDG Impact Intensity journal rating system analyzing data from 2016 to 2020.

=== Gender pay gap ===
Wiley reported a mean 2017 gender pay gap of 21.1% for its UK workforce, while the median was 21.5%. The gender bonus gaps are far higher, at 50.7% for the median measure and 42.3% for the mean. Wiley said: "Our mean and median bonus gaps are driven by our highest earners, who are predominantly male."

== Controversies ==
=== Forced inclusion of content in AI LLM training ===
In August 2024, it was reported that Wiley was projected to earn $44 million (£33 million) by providing artificial intelligence (AI) firms access to Wiley-published content for the purpose of training Large Language Models (LLMs) and that authors would not have the option to "opt out" of including their work in these training data sets. Groups representing authors, including the Society of Authors and the Creators' Rights Alliance, have expressed ethical concerns about these deals, citing a lack of transparency from publishers and affirmative consent from authors.

=== Journal protests ===
In 2020, the entire editorial board of the European Law Journal resigned over a dispute about contract terms and the behavior of its publisher, Wiley. The staff alleged that Wiley did not allow the editorial board members to decide editorial appointments and decisions.

A majority of the editorial board of the journal Diversity & Distributions resigned in 2018 after Wiley allegedly blocked the publication of a letter protesting the publisher's decision to make the journal entirely open access.

=== Publication practices ===
According to Retraction Watch, Wiley sometimes removes articles from their journals' websites without any explanation.

=== Manipulation of bibliometrics ===
According to Goodhart's law and concerned academics like the signatories of the San Francisco Declaration on Research Assessment, commercial academic publishers benefit from manipulation of bibliometrics and scientometrics like the journal impact factor, which is often used as proxy of prestige and can influence revenues, including public subsidies in the form of subscriptions and free work from academics.

Five Wiley journals, which exhibited unusual levels of self-citation, had their journal impact factor of 2019 suspended from Journal Citation Reports in 2020, a sanction which hit 34 journals in total.

Wiley investigated allegations of inaccurate or nonexistent references in a 2024 biodiversity book chapter and stated that appropriate corrective action would follow its review.

=== Publication of "paper mill" generated papers ===
In April 2022, the journal Science revealed that a Ukrainian company, International Publisher Ltd., run by Ksenia Badziun, operates a Russian website where academics can purchase authorships in soon-to-be-published academic papers. Over a two-year period, researchers found that at least 419 articles "appeared to match manuscripts that later appeared in dozens of different journals" and that "more than 100 of these identified papers were published in 68 journals run by established publishers, including Elsevier, Oxford University Press, Springer Nature, Taylor & Francis, Wolters Kluwer, and Wiley-Blackwell." Wiley-Blackwell claimed that they were examining the specific papers that were identified and brought to their attention.

In 2024, Wiley closed down 19 of the about 250 journals it had acquired in the Hindawi deal, after retracting "more than 11,300 'compromised' studies over the past two years"; Wiley had earlier shuttered four journals for publishing fake articles coming from paper mills.

=== Climate research and fossil fuel industry ===
Wiley is a publisher of climate change research, but also publishes a journal dedicated to fossil-fuel exploration. Climate scientists are concerned that this conflict of interest could undermine the credibility of climate science because they believe that fossil fuel extraction and climate action are incompatible.

== Copyright cases ==
=== Hindawi case ===
In 2021, Wiley purchased another Open Access company named Hindawi. Shortly after, many articles published by Hindawi were retracted and Scopus disconnected all of them from their database.

=== Photographer copyrights ===
A 2013 lawsuit brought by a stock photo agency for alleged violation of a 1997 license was dismissed for procedural reasons.

A 2014 ruling by the District Court for the Southern District of New York, later affirmed by the Second Circuit, says that Wiley infringed on the copyright of photographer Tom Bean by using his photos beyond the scope of the license it had purchased. The case was connected to a larger set of copyright infringement cases brought by photo agency DRK against various publishers.

A 2015 9th Circuit Court of Appeals opinion established that another photo agency had standing to sue Wiley for its usage of photos beyond the scope of the license acquired.

=== Used books ===
In 2018, a Southern District of New York court upheld the award of over $39 million to Wiley and other textbook publishers in a vast litigation against Book Dog Books, a re-seller of used books which was found to hold and distribute counterfeit copies. The Court found that circumstantial evidence was sufficient to establish distribution of 116 titles for which counterfeit copies had been presented and of other 5 titles. It also found that unchallenged testimony on how the publishers usually acquired licenses from authors was sufficient to establish the publishers' copyright on the books in question.

=== Kirtsaeng v. John Wiley & Sons ===
In 2008, John Wiley & Sons filed suit against Thailand native Supap Kirtsaeng over the sale of textbooks made outside of the United States and then imported into the country. In 2013, the U.S. Supreme Court held 6–3 that the first-sale doctrine applied to copies of copyrighted works made and sold abroad at lower prices, reversing the Second Circuit decision which had favored Wiley.

=== Internet Archive lawsuit ===
In June 2020, Wiley was one of a group of publishers who sued the Internet Archive, arguing that its collection of e-books was denying authors and publishers revenue and accusing the library of "willful mass copyright infringement".

== Antitrust cases ==
In September 2024, Lucina Uddin, a neuroscience professor at UCLA, sued John Wiley & Sons along with five other academic journal publishers in a proposed class-action lawsuit, alleging that the publishers violated antitrust law by agreeing not to compete against each other for manuscripts and by denying scholars payment for peer review services.
