= Group tests =

Type of exam

A Group Test consists of tests that can be administered to a large group of people at one time. This is the opposite of an Individual Test, which is administered to one person at a time, typically by someone receiving payment to administer the test. Most testing today is administered as group tests, considering the many benefits that are associated with these tests. Considering the many standardized tests that are administered each year, it is understandable that many of these are group tests. Examples of group tests include statewide testing throughout K-12 students, placement examinations into college, and placement examinations into graduate coursework.

== Group Test Criteria ==
These tests are typically characterized as paper-and-pencil examinations; however, computer group testing is increasingly becoming much more popular. The Graduate Record Examination (GRE) has the option for students to take either a computer-based examination or a paper-based examination. Group tests mostly consist of multiple choice formats but some also include sentence completion or writing an essay, as does the GRE. Most group test scores are analyzed as percentiles.

There are many advantages to group tests over individual tests. Group tests are much more time-efficient in many aspects. For example, group tests are administered to many people at once; to test each individual is unrealistic. Group tests are also much easier to score because they are predominantly multiple-choice. More time is taken to score short answer or essay-based questions, but these are still much quicker than scoring each individual's answers. Scoring is also more objective and reliable since the subjectivity of the grader is not as prevalent. These tests are also more cost-efficient since they don't require expensive materials or extensive training for administrators.

== Caution for Group Tests ==
With the many benefits that are associated with group tests, it is important to consider some of the downfalls also associated with group tests. First, while these test scores can give some predictive aspects to secondary school achievement, college success, or graduate school success, these scores need to be considered with other factors in mind. Kaplan and Saccuzzo suggested "be especially careful in using these tests for prediction, except for predicting relatively limited factors over a brief time" (p. 308). Particularly when considering undergraduate or graduate school admissions, multiple aspects need to be considered for a complete evaluation.

Another caution to consider with group tests is the fact that the administrator can have a large influence when problems occur during individual tests. For example, when a problem arises, the administrator can address the problem to allow maximum performance for the respondent. Also, a lot of information can be learned about the subject beyond the score itself with individual tests. The administrator can work with the respondent in a standardized format while still helping when help is needed.
