= Phyllis Hodgson =

English Medievalist and translator (1909–2000)

Emeritus Professor Phyllis Hodgson (1909–2000) was a Medievalist and translator of medieval texts.

== Professional career ==
Hodgson was an undergraduate at Bedford College, London and did her doctoral work at the University of Oxford, where she would soon go on to earn the title of Professor. She then spent the remainder of her professional career at Bedford College before it became Royal Holloway, University of London, teaching Old and Middle English, her extensive time working at the college resulted in her teaching medievalists, including Elizabeth Salter, Stanley Hussey and David Burnley. Hodgson continued to teach at Bedford College until her retirement in 1972.

== Literary works ==
Hodgson edited the works of The Cloud of Unknowing and the Book of Privy Counselling, originally for the Early English Text Society in 1944, extensively revising them in her retirement. She also edited the General Prologue to The Canterbury Tales and The Franklin's Tale. Hodgson continued to pursue her interests of Medieval Literature and old English Christian Mysticism, going on to publish the only modern edition of The Orchard of Syon, the fifteenth-century Middle English translation of Catherine of Siena’s Diologo that was made for the Bridgettines nuns of the Syon Monastery.

Hodgson also wrote brief reviews of medievalist texts in the journal Modern Language Review.

== Death ==
Hogdson continued to research and write as a medieval scholar long after her work at Royal Holloway was complete, and died on 3 June 2000, aged 91.

== Posthumous acknowledgements ==
After Hodgson's death, Royal Holloway introduced the ‘Phyllis Hodgson Prize’ for any BA, Masters or PHD student with an ‘Exceptional achievement’ in Hodgson’s field.

== List of literary contributions ==
- Deonise Hid Diuinite: And Other Treatises on Contemplative Prayer Related to the Cloud of Unknowing – Editor
- Chaucer: The General Prologue to the Canterbury Tales – Editor
- The Cloud of Unknowing and the Book of Privy Counselling – Editor-
- General Prologue to the Canterbury Tales – Editor
- Introduction to Geoffrey Chaucer The Franklin's Tale – Editor
- Three Fourteenth Century English Mystics (Writers & Their Works) – Writer
