= Charles Wiley (publisher) =

American publisher, printer, bookseller (1782–1826)

Charles Wiley (1782–1826) was an American bookseller, printer and the founder of the business that, under the direction of his son John Wiley, became an academic publisher, and eventually the current organization John Wiley & Sons.

== Beginnings ==
Charles opened a small printing shop alongside One Reade Street in New York City. Soon it became a meeting point for writers and authors and Charles interest turned to publishing and book selling. At the age of 18, his son John Wiley took charge of the business. By mid 19th century John was joined by his sons who made the most of the opportunities of the industrial revolution. The Wiley grandson, also called Charles Wiley, was the son referred to when the business changed its name to John Wiley & Son in 1850. It was reorganized as John Wiley & Sons, Inc. when a younger grandson of the elder Charles, William H. Wiley, joined the family business in 1872.
