= Author mill =

An author mill is a publisher that relies on producing large numbers of small-run books by different authors, as opposed to a smaller number of works published in larger numbers. The term was coined by Victoria Strauss of Writer Beware, as a parallel formation from diploma mill, an unaccredited college or university that offers degrees without regard to academic achievement, and puppy mill, a breeding operation that produces large numbers of puppies for sale with little regard for breed purity, puppy placement, health, or socialization.

Predatory open access publishing is a closely related practice. However, the aims and the business model are rather different: predatory publishers will charge the author up front for publishing in a supposed scientific journal. Since academic evaluation is largely based on publication count or other bibliometrics, even well-meaning authors may be willing to pay to bolster their career prospects.

== Definition ==
As described by Writer Beware, an author mill is:

... a company that publishes a very large number of authors in the expectation of selling a hundred books or so from each (as opposed to publishing a limited number of authors in hopes of selling thousands of books from each, as commercial publishers do). Author mills don't require authors to make any financial expenditures at all, hidden or otherwise. However, they do rely on their authors as their major source of income (through books purchased by the author for re-sale, or sold to "pocket" markets the author him/herself is responsible for identifying), and so can be defined as vanity publishers, despite the lack of upfront or other charges. Also, author mills tend to share a business model with vanity publishers: no editorial screening of submissions, no meaningful pre-publication editing, no meaningful post-publication marketing or distribution.

Victoria Strauss has used the examples of PublishAmerica and VDM Publishing to illustrate the concept of author mill. More precisely, she has characterized VDM as "an academic author mill".

== Business model ==
Typically, an author mill does the cheapest possible job of production; it sets high cover prices and prints its books "on demand". The books are listed with online booksellers such as amazon.com and bn.com, and on the publisher's website. Any marketing, promotion, or physical bookstore placement is up to the authors themselves. While authors are not "required" to buy any of their own books, authors who wish to find readers discover that they need to buy their own books for resale.

The rise of the author mill is based on the rise of the online bookselling industry and digital printing technology which makes it cheap to print books on demand. The necessary ingredients are:

- Minimal editorial gatekeeping
- Low production costs (acquiring/editing/designing the book)
- Low set-up charges for reproducing the book
- The power to set the cover price high enough to make a profit on a small number of average sales
- A relatively predictable number of sales to the author, the author's family, and the author's friends.

== See also ==
- Accreditation mill
- Atlanta Nights
- Contract cheating
- Essay mill
- Ordination mill
- Research paper mill
- Nova Publishers
- Self-publishing
- Vanity publishing
