= Tracey Bretag =

Tracey Bretag EdD (1958–2020), was an Australian academic and educator, known for her extensive work in higher education, with a particular focus on plagiarism and academic integrity. Her research and advocacy focused on promoting ethical practices in academia and addressing issues related to academic misconduct.

== Early life and education ==
Tracey Bretag completed her Bachelor of Arts (BA - English & History) at James Cook University, an Honours Degree and a Master of Arts (MA) by Research in English from the University of Adelaide. She completed a Doctor of Education (Ed.D.) by research from the University of South Australia, where her research began to concentrate on academic integrity and ethics in education.

Bretag was known for spirited debates with colleagues and others on a variety of topics relating to integrity and ethics. Her commitment to ethics extended to her personal life and she followed a strict vegetarian diet. She was once arrested in Woomera, Australia on charges of trespassing for her support of youth refugees who had gone on a hunger strike. She was later charged with failing to obey the directions of a federal officer.

Bretag died of cancer at the age of 58 on October 7, 2020. Tributes from around the world included an obituary published by Times Higher Education, another from the Committee on Publication Ethics (COPE), tributes from colleagues, as well as Campus Morning Mail in Australia.

== Career ==
Bretag spent much of her career at the University of South Australia, where she served as the director of the UniSA Business School Office for Academic Integrity. Bretag's global influence in the field of academic integrity is evidenced, in part by the founding of the European Network for Academic Integrity in 2015.

=== Research contributions ===
According to Google Scholar, Bretag is among the most highly cited scholars in the field of academic integrity. Her research has significantly influenced the discourse on academic integrity. She published numerous articles and book chapters addressing topics such as plagiarism and self-plagiarism, and contract cheating. Bretag's work has been instrumental in shaping academic integrity best practices for educators and institutions worldwide, as well as setting a global research agenda for academic integrity. Some notable research projects included:

==== Exemplary Academic Integrity Project ====
This project was the first of its kind in the world, as team members conducted in-depth policy analysis of academic integrity policies across Australia. The project led to evidence-based recommendations about how to develop and maintain academic integrity policies in higher education. This project had international influence, as the 'Five Core Elements of Exemplary Academic Integrity Policies' were later used by researchers in other countries such as New Zealand, Canada, and throughout South America as a framework for policy analysis, development and revision. Although this project began in Australia, it had a ripple effect of influencing academic integrity policy and procedure development across the world. More than a decade after the initial results of the project were published in Australia, the project continues to have an influence in that country.

==== Academic Integrity online training program ====
Bretag was the Lead Advisor for the first edition of the Academic Integrity training program for staff and students, published by Epigeum, an imprint of Oxford University Press, at the time of the first edition. This online training program included modules for teaching staff and students. It was widely regarded as one of the most comprehensive online training programs for academic integrity at the time. Epigeum was later sold to Sage Publications, who continued the project into a second edition after Bretag's death. The second edition was led by Thomas Lancaster and Sarah Elaine Eaton, who maintained a focus on quality throughout the process to continue to honour Bretag's original contributions.

==== Contract Cheating Project ====
Starting in 2011 Bretag led four large Australian Office for Learning and Teaching (OLT) funded research projects. One of these, the OLT project Contract cheating and assessment design: Exploring the connection was co-led with Rowena Harper. This project included the largest survey anywhere in the world of students and teaching staff to gather data about their attitudes towards, and experiences with contract cheating.

Bretag was a former chair of the Asia-Pacific Forum on Educational Integrity, and a past president of the executive board to the International Center for Academic Integrity in the U.S.

==== International Journal for Educational Integrity ====
Bretag co-founded the International Journal for Educational Integrity (IJEI) in 2005, together with Helen Titchener (formerly known as Helen Marsden). The inaugural issue of the journal included contributions from some of the best known scholars in the field at the time including Donald (Don) McCabe), Jude Carroll and Jon Appleton, Ursula McGowan, Sue Saltmarsh, and Celia Thompson.

From 2005 to 2015 the IJEI was hosted by the University of South Australia's Open Journal System (OJS), before being moved to Springer. The archives of the first ten years of IJEI remain publicly and freely accessible as open access articles. Bretag served as the sole editor-in-chief of the International Journal for Educational Integrity from 2005 to 2019. Upon learning of her terminal illness she invited Sarah Elaine Eaton (University of Calgary) to join her as co-editor. Eaton carried on as Editor-in-Chief after Bretag's death in 2020.

==== Handbook of Academic Integrity ====
Another of Bretag's scholarly achievements was the Handbook of Academic Integrity, published by Springer in 2016. Bretag conceptualized the first edition of the handbook and served as the Editor-in-Chief, as well as a contributing author. The handbook included more than 70 chapters from experts all over the world and is considered a foundational text on academic integrity.

=== Leadership and advocacy ===
Bretag was a fierce advocate for legislation against contract cheating in Australia and after legislation was introduced, her influence with government and policy makers was noted by the media.

==== Committee on Publication Ethics (COPE) ====
Bretag was an elected member of the Committee on Publication Ethics (COPE) Council from 2017 until her death. In this role, she contributed to global dialogue, education, and advocacy on topics related to research integrity and publication ethics. In doing so, she was one of the first people to make concrete connections between plagiarism and academic integrity in educational contexts, and scientific integrity and ethics beyond the classroom.

=== Life as a public intellectual ===
Bretag's work extended to life as a public intellectual. She wrote and spoke about topics related to ethics and corruption in higher education. She published commentaries and articles in Nature and The Conversation. She was regularly called upon by the media to provide commentary.

==== Keynote speeches ====
Bretag was an internationally recognized keynote speaker. She headlined conferences in Australia, Europe, and Canada, among other places.

== Awards and recognition ==
Bretag received numerous awards and recognitions for her contributions to education and academic integrity. Her commitment to improving academic practices has earned her recognition as a leading expert in the field. Bretag's awards included the UniSA Scholarly Teaching and Postgraduate Lecturer of the Year Awards in 2003, Supported Teacher Awards from UniSA from 2005 to 2009, an Excellence in Teaching Award from UniSA Division of Business in 2010, an ESL Educator of the Year Award by the English as a Second Language Educators (SA) Inc in 2004 and a Certificate of Commendation for Research Excellence from UniSA Business School in 2014.

In 2019, Times Higher Education named Bretag as one of the "People of the year: Who mattered in Higher Education in 2019".

== Legacy ==
Before her death, Studiosity - via Founder Jack Goodman - sought Tracey's approval and advice to launch the Tracey Bretag Prize for Academic Integrity. Following her death, two awards were named in Bretag's honour. The European Network for Academic Integrity named an annual award after her, the "Tracey Bretag ENAI Memorial Award".

Through her research, teaching, and advocacy, Bretag continues to be a vital influence in promoting integrity within academia, ensuring that educational institutions uphold the highest ethical standards.
