= The Cloud of Unknowing =

Medieval work of Christian mysticism

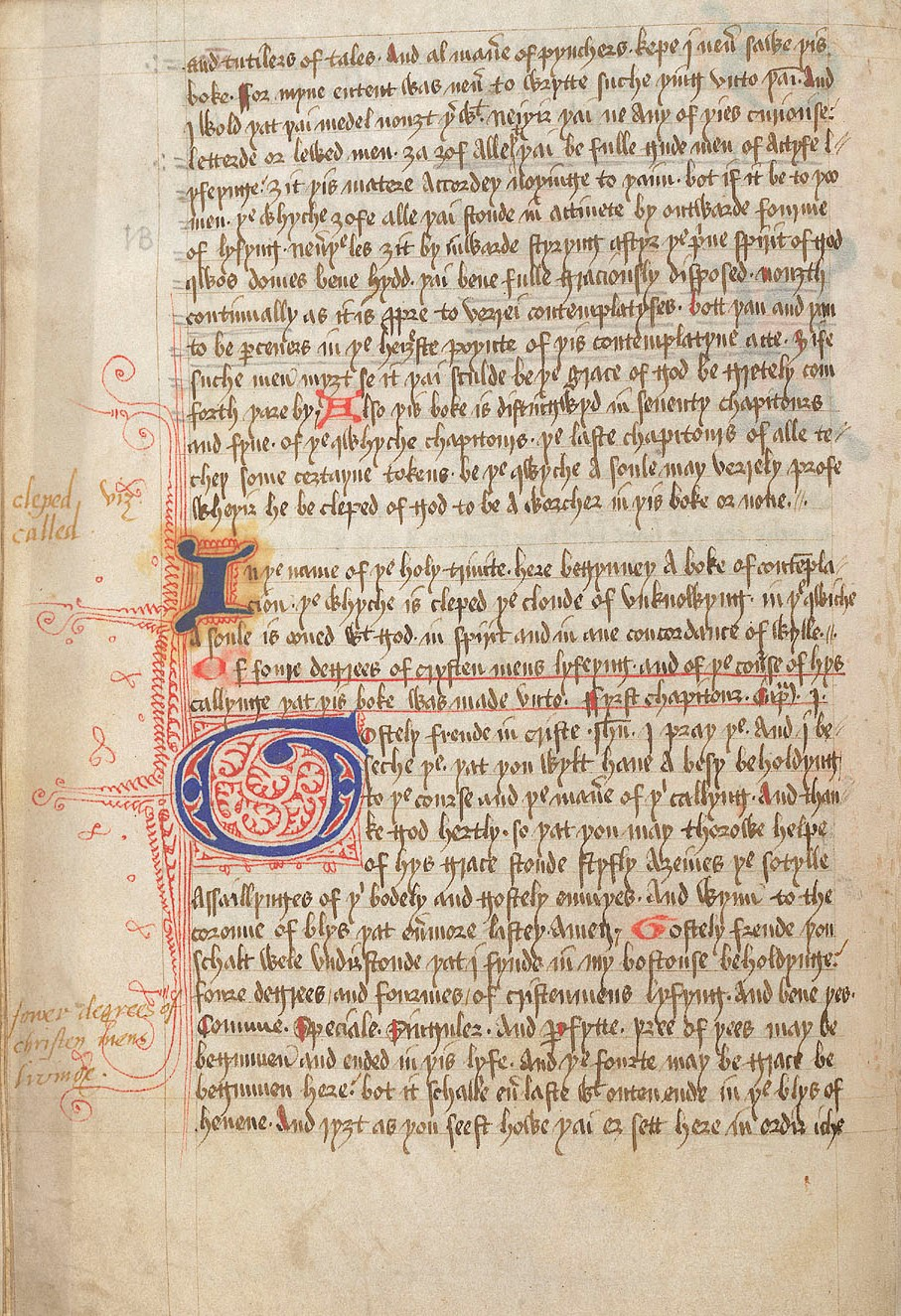
- The first page of Cloud of Unknowing in the 15th century manuscript Harley MS 2373, beginning with the Decorated initial "I" (Note: "A later owner has glossed the Middle English word 'cleped' with its modern equivalent 'called', in the left margin.")
- Author: Anonymous
- Original title: The Cloude of Unknowyng
- Language: Middle English
- Subject: Love of God, Christian mysticism
- Genre: Christian mysticism
- Publication date: Late 14th century
- Publication place: England
- Followed by: The Book of Privy Counseling

The Cloud of Unknowing (Middle English: The Cloude of Unknowyng) is an anonymous work of Christian mysticism written in Middle English in the latter half of the 14th century. The text is written as guide from a teacher to a student, with the message that God cannot be understood via reason or intellect, but only through love: “By love may He be gotten and holden, but never through thought.” To achieve this goal, the text recommends cultivation of two mental states: “The cloud of forgetting” (temporarily setting aside one’s knowledge and intellect), and “the cloud of unknowing” (God dwells beyond human understanding).

== History ==
The Cloud of Unknowing draws on the mystical tradition of Pseudo-Dionysius the Areopagite and Christian Neoplatonism, which focuses on the via negativa road to discovering God as a pure entity, beyond any capacity of mental conception and so without any definitive image or form. This tradition has reputedly inspired generations of mystics, from John Scotus Eriugena, Nicholas of Cusa, and John of the Cross. Prior to this, the theme of a passing cloud of ignorance (as opposed to the heavenly and eternal truth of God beyond the cloud) had appeared briefly in the Confessions of Saint Augustine (XIII, XV, 17–18) written around 398 AD. Concerning the placement of The Cloud of Unknowing in the trends of the Catholic Church at the approximate time of its writing, the work joins a broader medieval movement within Christianity toward a religious experience of a more individual and passionate view of relationship with God.

The author is unknown. The English Augustinian mystic Walter Hilton has at times been suggested, but this is generally doubted.

A second major work by the same author, The Book of Privy Counseling (originally titled Prive Counselling), continues the themes discussed in the Cloud. It is less than half the length of the Cloud, appears to be the author's final work, and clarifies and deepens some of its teachings. In this work, the author characterizes the practice of contemplative unknowing as worshiping God with one's "substance," coming to rest in a "naked blind feeling of being," and ultimately finding thereby that God is one's being. Experience, in keeping with the mystical tradition, is considered the ultimate means by which a Christian can and should relate to God, and the practice of contemplation in The Cloud is thus focused on the experience of God by the contemplative. This relationship between God and the contemplative takes place within continual conflict between the spirit and the physical. God is spirit in the purest sense; therefore, no matter how intense one's desire or how fervent one's love, the movement toward God by body-bound contemplatives will ever be halted by the cloud of unknowing that hides God from our understanding and prevents the fullest and truest experience of God's being. The object of the contemplative experience is to know God, as much as possible, from within this cloud of unknowing.

== Contents ==
The Cloud of Unknowing is written specifically to a student, and the author strongly commands the student in the prologue, "do not willingly and deliberately read it, copy it, speak of it, or allow it to be read, copied, or spoken of, by anyone or to anyone, except by or to a person who, in your opinion, has undertaken truly and without reservation to be a perfect follower of Christ."

The book counsels the young student to seek God, not through knowledge and intellect (faculty of the human mind), but through intense contemplation, motivated by love, and stripped of all thought other than Christ: “refuse to think of anything but Him.” (Note: An important introductory section of Thomas Aquinas' Summa Theologica states a recurring premise of the work: that "we cannot know what God is, but rather what He is not, we have no means for considering how God is, but rather how He is not." As for how to proceed: "Now it can be shown how God is not, by denying of Him whatever is opposed to the idea of Him" (Intro to Treatise on Divine Simplicity, Prima Pars, Q. 3). It's possible either that the author of the Cloud was influenced by Aquinas, or correspondingly, both the author and Aquinas were influenced by Pseudo-Dionysius. Orthodox Christian philosophy is also influenced by Pseudo-Dionysius.) Experience of a "cloud of unknowing" is introduced Chapter 3:

"For the first time you [lift your heart to God with stirrings of love], you will find only a darkness, and as it were a cloud of unknowing [...] Whatever you do, this darkness and the cloud are between you and your God, and hold you back from seeing him clearly by the light of understanding in your reason and from experiencing him in the sweetness of love in your feelings. [...] And so prepare to remain in this darkness as long as you can, always begging for him you love; for if you are ever to feel or see him...it must always be in this cloud and this darkness."

— The Cloud of Unknowing and Other Works. Translated by A. C. Spearing. London: Penguin. 2001. pp. 22. ISBN 0-14-044762-8.

This is brought about by putting all thoughts and desires under a "cloud of forgetting," and thereby piercing God's cloud of unknowing with a "dart of longing love" from the heart. This form of contemplation is not directed by the intellect, but involves spiritual union with God through the heart:

For He can well be loved, but he cannot be thought. By love he can be grasped and held, but by thought, neither grasped nor held. And therefore, though it may be good at times to think specifically of the kindness and excellence of God, and though this may be a light and a part of contemplation, all the same, in the work of contemplation itself, it must be cast down and covered with a cloud of forgetting. And you must step above it stoutly but deftly, with a devout and delightful stirring of love, and struggle to pierce that darkness above you; and beat on that thick cloud of unknowing with a sharp dart of longing love, and do not give up, whatever happens."

As one pursues the beating of the cloud of unknowing as compelled by spiritual stirrings of love in the heart, the intellect and sinful stirrings will often pull the contemplative's focus away from God and back to the things of physical world and of the self. The author thus enjoins the contemplative to "vigorously trample on [any new thoughts or sinful stirrings] with a fervent stirring of love, and tread them down beneath your feet. And try to cover them with a thick cloud of forgetting, as if they had never been done by you or anyone else on earth. [...] Push them down as often as they rise."

The author draws a strong distinction in Chapters 16-22 between the active and contemplative Christian life. He illustrates the distinction by drawing heavily from the account of Mary and Martha in the Gospel of Luke, writing that "[By] Mary all contemplatives are understood, so that they should model their way of life on hers; and similarly by Martha, all actives, with the same consequent resemblance." While the author holds Mary as the superior example in the passage as a "model for all of us [who seek to be contemplatives]," he clarifies that Martha's activity in service to God was nonetheless "good and beneficial for her salvation" but not the best thing.

Chapter 23 of The Book of Privy Counseling praises experience over knowledge:

"And so I urge you, go after experience rather than knowledge. On account of pride, knowledge may often deceive you, but this gentle, loving affection will not deceive you. Knowledge tends to breed conceit, but love builds. Knowledge is full of labor, but love, full of rest."

Chapters 39 and 40 recommend the focus on a single word as the means to invoke the fullness of God:

When we intend to pray for goodness, let all our thought and desire be contained in the one small word "God." Nothing else and no other words are needed, for God is the epitome of all goodness. Immerse yourself in the spiritual reality it speaks of yet without precise ideas of God's works whether small or great, spiritual or material. Do not consider any particular virtue which God may teach you through grace, whether it is humility, charity, patience, abstinence, hope, faith, moderation, chastity, or evangelical poverty. For to a contemplative they are, in a sense, all the same. Let this little word represent to you God in all his fullness and nothing less than the fullness of God. (Note: Ch. 39-40, other translations: * Evelyn Underhill (1922/2003): "And if we will intentively pray for getting of good, let us cry, either with word or with thought or with desire, nought else nor no more words, but this word "God". For why, in God be all good.. Fill thy spirit with the ghostly bemeaning of it without any special beholding to any of His works—whether they be good, better, or best of all—bodily or ghostly, or to any virtue that may be wrought in man’s soul by any grace; not looking after whether it be meekness or charity, patience or abstinence, hope, faith, or soberness, chastity or wilful poverty. What recks this in contemplatives?.. they covet nothing with special beholding, but only good God. Do thou.. mean God all, and all God, so that nought work in thy wit and in thy will, but only God. * Middle English original: "And yif we wil ententifly preie for getyng of goodes, lat us crie, outher with worde or with thought or with desire, nought elles, ne no mo wordes, bot this worde God. For whi in God ben alle goodes.. Fille thi spirit with the goostly bemenyng of it withoutyn any specyal beholdyng to any of His werkes whether thei be good, betir, or alther best, bodily or goostly—or to any vertewe that may be wrought in mans soule by any grace, not lokyng after whether it be meeknes or charité, pacyence or abstynence, hope, feith, or sobirnes, chastité or wilful poverté. What thar reche in contemplatyves?.. thei coveyte nothing with specyal beholdyng, bot only good God. Do thou.. mene God al, and al God, so that nought worche in thi witte and in thi wile, bot only God.)

While the author presents many methods of his own for effective contemplation of God, he often leaves the teaching of method to God himself. In Chapter 40, for example, he advises a contemplative who is struggling with sin to "[...] feel sin as a lump, you do not know what, but nothing other than yourself. And then shout continuously in spirit, 'Sin, sin, sin! out, out, out!' This spiritual shout is better learned from God by experience than from any human being by word."

While the practice of contemplation in The Cloud is focused upon the experience of spiritual reality by the soul, the author also makes some provision for the needs of the body, going so far as to say that care for the body is an important element of spiritual contemplation if only to prevent hindrance of its practice. He writes in Chapter 41:

And so, for the love of God, guard against sickness as much as you reasonably can, so that, as far as you may, you are not the cause of your own weakness. For I tell you that this work demands the greatest tranquility, and a state of health and purity in body as much as in soul. And so, for the love of God, regulate your conduct with moderation in body and in soul, and keep yourself as healthy as possible.

— The Cloud of Unknowing and Other Works. Translated by A. C. Spearing. London: Penguin Publishers. 2001. pp. 64–65. ISBN 0-14-044762-8.

== Other works by the same author ==
In addition to The Cloud of Unknowing and The Book of Privy Counseling, the Cloud author is believed to be responsible for a few other spiritual treatises and translations, including:

- Deonise Hid Divinity, a free translation of the Mystical Theology by Pseudo-Dionysius the Areopagite. A vernacular translation of the Mystical Theology was unprecedented; however, it was clearly not widely read, since only two manuscripts survive.
- A Letter of Prayer (A Pistle of Prayer), which survives in seven manuscripts. (Online);
- A Letter of Discretion of Stirrings (A Pistle of Discrecioun of Stirings). (Online, part VI of "The Cell of Self Knowledge")
- It is possible, but doubtful, that he wrote A Treatise of Discernment of Spirits (originally titled A Tretis of Discrecyon of Spirites), a free translation of Sermones di Diversis nos 23–24, by Bernard of Clairvaux, (Online).
- It is possible, but doubtful, that he wrote A Treatise of the Study of Wisdom that Men Call Benjamin (also called Pursuit of Wisdom, and, in its original, A Tretyse of the Stodye of Wysdome that Men Clepen Beniamyn), an abbreviated and free translation of the Benjamin Minor by Richard of Saint Victor (Online).

== Manuscripts ==
The Cloud of Unknowing has 17 known manuscripts. The two best known are British Library Harley MS 2373 and Cambridge University Library Kk.vi.26. These contain all seven of the works attributed to the Cloud author, the former extensively glossed in Latin. Another important manuscript is British Library Harleian 2373, which contains all but Deonise Hid Divinity.

== Later influence ==
Given its survival in only seventeen manuscripts, The Cloud of Unknowing was not popular in late medieval England, perhaps because the Cloud is addressed to solitaries and concentrates on advanced levels of the mystical path. Two Latin translations of the Cloud were made in the late 15th century. One was made by Richard Methley, a Carthusian of the Charterhouse of Mount Grace in Yorkshire, and finished in 1491. The other is anonymous. Neither enjoyed wide dissemination.

This work became known to English Catholics in the mid-17th century, when the Benedictine monk Augustine Baker (1575–1641) wrote an exposition on its doctrine based on a manuscript copy in the library of the monastery of Cambrai in Flanders. The original work itself, however, was not published until 1877. English mystic Evelyn Underhill edited an important version of the work in 1922.

The work became increasingly popular over the course of the twentieth century, with nine English translations or modernisations produced in this period. In particular, The Cloud influenced contemplative prayer practices. The practical prayer advice contained in The Cloud of Unknowing forms a primary basis for the contemporary practice of Centering Prayer, a form of Christian meditation developed by Trappist monks William Meninger, Basil Pennington and Thomas Keating in the 1970s. It also informed the meditation techniques of the English Benedictine John Main.

The contemplation method urged in The Cloud is similar to Buddhist meditation and modern transcendental meditation.

== Editions ==
- Billy, Dennis J., CSsR (2014). The Cloud of the Unknowing, Liguori Publications, Liguori, Missouri. ISBN 9780764-822889.
- Butcher, Carmen Acevedo (2018). The Cloud of Unknowing. Boston: Shambhala Pocket Edition. ISBN 978-1-61180-622-9.
- Butcher, Carmen Acevedo (2009). The Cloud of Unknowing with the Book of Privy Counsel. Boston: Shambhala. ISBN 978-1-59030-622-2.
- The Cloud of Unknowing: And The Book of Privy Counseling (1944). ed. Phyllis Hodgson. Early English Text Society. Oxford University Press, hardback: ISBN 0-19-722218-8.
- The Cloud of Unknowing (1957). translator, Ira Progoff. Dell/Doubleday. 1983 paperback: ISBN 0-440-31994-3, 1989 paperback: ISBN 0-385-28144-7
- Johnston, William; preface:Huston Smith (1996) [1973]. The Cloud of Unknowing and the Book of Privy Counseling. New York: Image Books. ISBN 0-385-03097-5. (first edition, 1973)
- John J. Kirvan (1996). Where Only Love Can Go: A Journey of the Soul into the Cloud of Unknowing. Ave Maria Press. ISBN 0877935912.
- The Cloud of Unknowing and other works. Penguin Classics. 2001. ISBN 978-0-14-044762-0. Translated by A. C. Spearing
- The Cloud of Unknowing and Other Works. New York: Penguin Books. 1961. ISBN 0-14-044-385-1. Translated by Clifton Wolters. Includes The Cloud of Unknowing, The Epistle of Privy Counsel, Dionysius' Mystical Teaching, and The Epistle of Prayer.
- Walsh, James, ed. (1981). The Cloud of Unknowing. Preface by Simon Tugwell, Introduction by James Walsh. New York: Paulist Press. ISBN 978-08091-2332-2.

Editions of related texts include

- Deonise Hid Divinite: And Other Treatises on Contemplative Prayer Related to The Cloud of Unknowing (1955). ed., Phyllis Hodgson. Early English Text Society. Oxford University Press, 2002 paperback: 0859916987
- The Pursuit of Wisdom: And Other Works by the Author of The Cloud of Unknowing (1988). translator, James Walsh. Paulist Press Classics of Western Spirituality. paperback: ISBN 0-8091-2972-8.

== See also ==
- Apophatic theology (known also as the via negativa)
- Lectio Divina
