= Wiley-Blackwell =

Journal publishing business of John Wiley & Sons

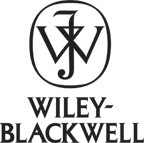
- Parent company: Wiley
- Founded: 1922; 104 years ago
- Country of origin: United States
- Headquarters location: Hoboken, New Jersey
- Publication types: Books, academic journals
- Official website: wiley.com/blackwell

Wiley-Blackwell is an international scientific, technical, medical, and scholarly publishing business of John Wiley & Sons. It was formed by the merger of John Wiley & Sons Global Scientific, Technical, and Medical business with Blackwell Publishing in 2007.

Wiley-Blackwell is now an imprint that publishes a diverse range of academic and professional fields, including biology, medicine, physical sciences, technology, social science, and the humanities.

== Blackwell Publishing history ==
Blackwell Publishing was formed by the 2001 merger of two Oxford-based academic publishing companies, Blackwell Science, founded in 1939 as Blackwell Scientific Publishing, and Blackwell Publishers, founded in 1922 as Basil Blackwell & Mott. Blackwell Publishers, founded in 1926, had its origins in the 19th century Blackwell's family bookshop and publishing business.

The merger between the two publishing companies created the world's leading learned society publisher. The group then acquired BMJ Books from the BMJ Publishing Group, publisher of The BMJ, a British medical journal, in 2004. Blackwell published over 805 journals and 650 text and reference books in 2006, across a wide range of academic, medical, and professional subjects.

On November 17, 2006, John Wiley & Sons announced it had "entered into a definitive agreement to acquire" Blackwell Publishing. The acquisition was completed in February 2007, at a purchase price of £572 million. Blackwell Publishing was merged into Wiley's Global Scientific, Technical, and Medical business to create Wiley-Blackwell. From June 30, 2008, the journals previously on Blackwell Synergy were delivered through Wiley InterScience.

== Controversy ==
In April 2022, the journal Science reported that a Ukrainian company, International Publisher Ltd., run by Ksenia Badziun, operates a Russian website where academics can purchase authorships in soon to be published academic papers. During the 2 year period analyzed by researchers, they found that at least 419 articles "appeared to match manuscripts that later appeared in dozens of different journals" and that "More than 100 of these identified papers were published in 68 journals run by established publishers, including Elsevier, Oxford University Press, Springer Nature, Taylor & Francis, Wolters Kluwer, and Wiley-Blackwell." Wiley-Blackwell claimed that they were examining the specific papers that were identified and brought to their attention.

== See also ==
- List of journals published by Wiley-Blackwell
