= Term paper =

School or college research paper

A term paper is a research paper written by students over an academic term, accounting for a large part of a grade. Merriam-Webster defines it as "a major written assignment in a school or college course representative of a student's achievement during a term". Term papers are generally intended to describe an event, a concept, or argue a point. It is a written original work discussing a topic in detail, usually several typed pages in length, and is often due at the end of a semester.

There is much overlap between the terms research paper and term paper. A term paper was originally a written assignment (usually a research-based paper) that was due at the end of the "term"—either a semester or quarter, depending on which unit of measure a school used. However, not all term papers involve academic research, and not all research papers are term papers.

== History ==
Term papers date back to the beginning of the 19th century when print could be reproduced cheaply and written texts of all types (reports, memoranda, specifications, and scholarly articles) could be easily produced and disseminated. Moulton and Holmes (2003) write that during the years from 1870 to 1900 "American education was transformed as writing became a method of discourse and research the hallmark of learning."

Russell (1991) writes that in the 1910s, "the research paper began to harden into its familiar form" adding that plagiarism and the sale of research papers both became a problem during this time.

== Plagiarism in the computer era ==
In the present day an entire industry has sprung up to provide plagiarized, pre-written or custom written term papers for students of varying levels of education. There are many websites that sell term papers of all levels of quality and writing proficiency, but submission of a purchased paper would be considered a serious breach of the submitting student's academic integrity by any reputable academic institution. Also, plagiarism can be unknowingly committed by students.

== See also ==
- Academic publishing
- Final examination
- Thesis
- Coursework
