= Coursework =

Work performed by students for the purpose of learning

Coursework (also course work, especially British English) is work performed by students or trainees for the purpose of learning. Coursework may be specified and assigned by teachers, or by learning guides in self-taught courses. Coursework can encompass a wide range of activities, including practice, experimentation, research, and writing (e.g., dissertations, book reports, and essays). In the case of students at universities, high schools and middle schools, coursework is often graded and the scores are combined with those of separately assessed exams to determine overall course scores. In contrast to exams, students may be allotted several days or weeks to complete coursework, and are often allowed to use text books, notes, and the Internet for research.

In universities, students are usually required to perform coursework to broaden knowledge, enhance research skills, and demonstrate that they can discuss, reason and construct practical outcomes from learned theoretical knowledge. Sometimes coursework is performed by a group so that students can learn both how to work in groups and from each other.

== Plagiarism and other problems ==
Plagiarism and copying can be problematic in graded coursework. Easily accessible websites have given students opportunities to copy ideas and even complete essays, and remain undetected despite measures to detect this. While coursework may give learners the chance to improve their grades, it also provides an opportunity to "cheat the system". Also, there is often controversy regarding the type and amount of help students can receive while completing coursework. In most learning institutions, plagiarism or unreasonable coursework help may lead to coursework disqualification, student expulsion, or both.

=== UK GCSE coursework ===
Coursework was removed from UK GCSE courses and replaced by "Controlled Assessment", much of which must be completed under exam conditions, without teacher assistance and with access to resources tightly controlled in order to reduce the possibility of cheating. However, this too has been largely removed and replaced by mainly exam-based assessment as part of a general GCSE reform.

== See also ==
- Busy work
- Education
- Homework
- School
- Term paper
