= Essay mill =

Writing business used for academic fraud

An essay mill (also term paper mill) is a business that allows customers to commission an original piece of writing on a particular topic so that they may commit academic fraud. Customers provide the company with specific information about the essay, including the number of pages, general topic, and a time frame to work within. The customer is charged a certain amount per page. A similar concept is the essay bank, a company from which students can purchase prewritten but less expensive essays on various topics, at higher risk of being caught. Both forms of business are under varying legal restraints in some jurisdictions.

== History ==
The idea of paper mills dates to the mid-19th century, when "paper reservoirs" were in fraternity houses' basements. Also known as "fraternity files", they were used by students who shared term papers and submitted other students' work. These essay banks inspired the commercialization of ghostwritten essay-writing practices. As early as the 1950s, advertisements circulating on college campuses described services that included ghostwritten work for dissertations, theses, and term papers.

In conjunction with this practice, students in the 1960s and 1970s started to stray from diligent and engaged coursework because they saw an emphasis on the benefits of community involvement. A new focus on activities outside the classroom took away from time for classwork, thus promoting these writing services throughout college campuses.

Later, actual businesses near college campuses charged students for custom-written essays. One could walk into a building and peruse pricing pamphlets, speak to someone directly to place an order, or make a selection from a vault of recycled research papers in these businesses' basements.

== Products and services ==
Essay mills hire university students, graduates, and professional writers to ghostwrite essays and term papers, and use advertising targeting students. Until the early 1990s, most essay mills were brick-and-mortar businesses offering their services by mail order or from offices in university or college towns. By the 2000s, most essay mills had switched to an e-commerce business model, soliciting business and selling essays online. Companies often provide free sample essays on popular topics to attract Internet searches.

To obtain an essay, a customer usually submits a form that describes the assignment they want completed, how many pages it needs to be, and when it needs to be completed. Employees search through requests until they find something they can write quickly and that will satisfy the page requirement. It does not matter whether writers have knowledge of the subject; if it is easy to research, they will do the job.

Depending on how much a student pays an essay mill, a student can receive a number of different products. The most expensive are full written essays or even dissertations. Requested papers can follow specific guidelines laid out by the student, including use of a certain number of sources, a preselected topic, and receipt of a specific grade. Some students request high marks on purchased essays to boost their grade point average (GPA); some deliberately order an essay that will give them a "C" to reduce suspicion of academic fraud. Cheaper options include detailed outlines of information to be included in essays that students write themselves. Due to the minimalist nature of this type of transaction, it can be very difficult for schools to catch this type of paid academic assistance.

Like essay mills, essay banks sell students prewritten essays. Due to the nature of essay bank essays, students are more likely to be caught committing academic dishonesty. Because of this, essay bank essays generally cost less than those from essay mills.

== Legal status ==
The first major legal battle against an essay mill came in 1972 in the case of State of New York v. Saksniit. This case involved the state challenging an essay mill's business with reference to the New York Education Law. The law "condemns the obtaining of a degree by fraudulent means or 'aiding and abetting' another to do the same." The state claimed that the students were using the term papers they purchased for credit and even though the company stated that the essays they wrote were for research purposes only, their advertising scheme encouraged otherwise by boasting about grades. The court determined that the disclaimers did not sufficiently protect the company because their encouragement of cheating and plagiarism hurt the educational system. The ruling called for the company to cease business in the State of New York. Several other legal battles have been fought since and have largely resulted in the punishment of the term paper writers rather than the students purchasing them.

California Education Code Section 66400 "penalizes the preparation or sale of term papers, theses, or dissertations for compensation ...." The law is applicable when the preparer/seller knew or should have known that the recipient would submit the paper for academic credit. State residents or academic institutions "acting for the interest of itself, its students, or the general public" can file suit against offenders for "any relief as is necessary." This law differs from that of New York in various ways, including holding the vendor responsible even if it claims that the paper was not intended to be turned in for credit, if the court concludes that it should have known that it would, or if the claim is not credible. For example, while some essay mills state that their products are not intended to be submitted for credit, they may also boast of the high grades that their papers have received.

The 2011 Florida Statutes Section 877.17 states that it is a second degree misdemeanor to "sell, offer to sell, or advertise for sale" a "written, recorded, pictorial, artistic, or other assignment" to another for submission "unaltered to a substantial degree." In the state of Florida, second-degree misdemeanors are punishable by up to sixty days in prison.

In total, 17 US states have some form of legal regime prohibiting academic cheating services.

Essay mills and similar academic cheating services are also illegal in England and Wales, Australia, Ireland, New Zealand and Austria, among other jurisdictions. Scholars have indicated that these laws, many of which are drawn up without knowledge or intent requirements, may be so large in scope as to criminalise the provision and advertising of many general purpose, generative AI systems, such as online large language models.

== Criticism and controversy ==
The academic community has criticized essay mill companies for helping students commit academic fraud.

Some essay mills have defended themselves against criticism by claiming that they are selling pre-written examples that students can use as guidelines and models for their work. In 2002, the UK-based essay mill Elizabeth Hall Associates required students purchasing essays to sign a disclaimer that "any material provided by Elizabeth Hall Associates [is] on the understanding that it is a guidance model only." Other essay mills claim that they are "scholarly publishing houses" that provide students with essays that they can cite in their work.

Students from different academic backgrounds have used essay mills. Many prestigious universities and colleges have caught their students turning in papers they bought from essay mills. The University of California, San Diego caught 600 students cheating in one year. One of the forms of cheating was turning in papers bought from essay mills.

Term paper mills bring up ethical controversies. Some people view them as unethical, others as unobjectionable. People view essay mills as ethical for different reasons. Some customers say they use essay mills as a form of proofreading. Essay mill writers read their writing only to make comments and feedback about content and grammar mistakes. They also turn to essay mills to ensure that all citations are correct. Some customers claim they turn to essay mills because society has put too much pressure on students to achieve academic success. GPAs and grades are greatly stressed in schools, causing students to worry that they cannot meet their deadlines. Some students turn to paper mills to get a paper handed in on time. Essay mills have been compared to business situations. Some students view term paper mills as equivalent to companies outsourcing labor, a norm for businesses, insinuating that using term paper mills should be socially acceptable.

Others view purchasing essays from essay mills as unethical: it is a form of cheating and plagiarism because one person is taking credit for another's work. Academic institutions are concerned about how essay mills affect learning. Students who use essay mills do not go through the process of gathering research, a learning experience in itself. Some professors, such as Dan Ariely, a professor of psychology and behavioral economics at Duke University and the author of The (Honest) Truth About Dishonesty, worry about the message that term paper mills send to students. He says the existence of essay mills encourages laziness to be seen as acceptable. Ariely found essay mills that use plagiarism-encouraging language on their websites.

According to a study by Patrick Scanlon and David Neumann, 90% of students surveyed saw the practice as unethical. The same study showed that students believe around 20% of their peers frequently use these online services.

Many customers believe that essays ordered online will be from their own country, but this is not always the case, as essay mill companies are hosted around the world. Not only are many of the essay mill companies hosted overseas, but many of their writers do not have graduate degrees, and have learned English as their second language.

Having essay mills set up internationally allows the owners of these companies to make high profits by paying wages in low-wage countries while selling the work of their employees in high-wage countries. According to a 2009 article in The Chronicle of Higher Education, overseas writers get between $1 and $3 per page out of the $20 to $30 US customers pay per page. Compared to US-based writers who work for essay mills, this is a very low rate. A 2010 Chronicle of Higher Education article interviewed an American essay mill writer, who said he received half the money clients pay for a paper.

Within the US, the amount writers are paid varies by up to a factor of five as of 2010. Some US writers earn around $1,000 per month in their highest-paying months, which as of 2009 is a low wage. Some of the better writers earn up to $5,000 per month.

== Strategies for combating academic fraud ==
Universities and colleges have developed several strategies to combat this type of academic misconduct. Some professors require students to submit electronic versions of their term papers, so that the text of the essay can be compared by anti-plagiarism software (such as Turnitin) against databases of known "essay mill" term papers, and new software called Authorship Investigate, also by Turnitin, can look at a paper and compare it against a student's other writings to yield a probabilistic estimate of whether the student is the real author.

Other universities have enacted rules allowing professors to give students oral examinations on papers which a professor believes to be ghostwritten; if the student is unfamiliar with the content of an essay that they have submitted, or its sources, then the student can be charged with academic fraud, a violation of the rules by which a student agrees to be bound when they enter a university or college program.

When a student is charged with academic fraud, their case is typically heard by a quasi-judicial administrative committee, which reviews the evidence. For students who are found guilty, the punishments range from a grade of zero on the specific assignment, to failure in the course in which the plagiarism occurred, to (in extreme or repeated cases) suspension or expulsion from the institution. In some cases, students who have committed academic fraud may also have academic honors, degrees, or awards revoked.

== See also ==
- Author's editor
- Author mill
- Accreditation mill
- Diploma mill
- Ordination mill
- Plagiarism
- Contract cheating
- Research paper mill
- Predatory publishing
