= A. C. Spearing =

American educator (born 1936)

Anthony Colin Spearing (born 31 January 1936) is William R. Kenan Jr. Professor of English at the University of Virginia, specialising in medieval literature. He translated The Cloud of Unknowing and Other Works for Penguin Classics.

== Education ==
He was a student at Jesus College, Cambridge, a research fellow at Gonville and Caius College, Cambridge and received his M.A. from the University of Cambridge in 1960. Notably, he completed a year of his doctoral research under the supervision of C.S. Lewis. He has been a Fellow of Queens' College, Cambridge since 1960, and Life Fellow since 1987. He has an honorary Ph.D. from Lund University, Sweden, and was awarded the degree of Doctor of Letters (Litt.D.) by the University of Cambridge on the 19th July 2014.

== Works ==
Spearing has published numerous books and papers on topics of medieval English literature, including many works on Geoffrey Chaucer. Works by Spearing include:

- Criticism and Medieval Poetry (1964, 2 edn 1972; ISBN 0-06-496441-8)
- An Introduction to Chaucer (with Maurice Hussey and James Winny, 1965; ISBN 0-521-09286-8)
- The Medieval Poet as Voyeur (1993; ISBN 0-521-41094-0)
- Textual Subjectivity: The Encoding of Subjectivity in Medieval Romances and Lyrics (2005; ISBN 0-19-818724-6).
