= Plagiarism =

Presenting another author's work as own original work

Plagiarism is the representation of another person's language, thoughts, ideas, or expressions as one's own original work. Although precise definitions vary depending on the institution, in many countries and cultures plagiarism is considered a violation of academic integrity and journalistic ethics, as well as of social norms around learning, teaching, research, fairness, respect, and responsibility. As such, a person or entity that is determined to have committed plagiarism is often subject to various punishments or sanctions, such as suspension, expulsion from school or work, fines, imprisonment, and other penalties.

Not all cultures and countries hold the same beliefs about personal ownership of language or ideas, and plagiarism is typically not in itself a crime. However, like counterfeiting, fraud can be punished in a court for prejudices caused by copyright infringement, violation of moral rights, or torts. In academia and in industry, it is a serious ethical offense. Plagiarism and copyright infringement functionally overlap, depending on the copyright law protection in force, but they are not equivalent concepts, and although many types of plagiarism may not meet the legal requirements in copyright law as adjudicated by courts, they still constitute the passing-off of another's work as one's own, and thus plagiarism.

== Etymology and ancient history ==
In the 1st century, the use of the Latin word plagiarius (literally "kidnapper") to denote copying someone else's creative work was pioneered by the Roman poet Martial, who complained that another poet had "kidnapped his verses". Plagiary, a derivative of plagiarus, was introduced into English in 1601 by dramatist Ben Jonson during the Jacobean Era to describe someone guilty of literary theft. The derived form plagiarism was introduced into English around 1620. The Latin words plagiārius ("kidnapper") and plagium ("kidnapping") have the same root: plaga ("snare", "net"), which is based on the Indo-European root *-plak, "to weave".

It is frequently claimed that people in antiquity had no concept of plagiarism, or at least did not condemn it, and that it only came to be seen as immoral much later, anywhere from the Age of Enlightenment in the 17th century to the Romantic movement in the 18th century. Although people in antiquity found detecting plagiarism difficult due to long travel times and scarcity of literate persons, there are a considerable number of pre-Enlightenment authors who accused others of plagiarism and considered it distasteful and scandalous, including historians Polybius and Pliny the Elder. The 3rd century Greek work Lives of the Eminent Philosophers mentions that Heraclides Ponticus was accused of plagiarizing (κλέψαντα αὐτὸν) a treatise on Hesiod and Homer. In Vitruvius's 7th book, he acknowledged his debt to earlier writers and attributed them, and he also included a strong condemnation of plagiarism: "Earlier writers deserve our thanks, those, on the contrary, deserve our reproaches, who steal the writings of such men and publish them as their own. Those, who depend in their writings, not on their own ideas, but who enviously do wrong to the works of others and boast of it, deserve not merely to be blamed, but to be sentenced to actual punishment for their wicked course of life." Vitruvius went on to claim that "such things did not pass without strict chastisement". He recounted a story where the well-read Aristophanes of Byzantium judged a poetry competition and caught most of the contestants plagiarizing others' poems as their own. The king ordered the plagiarizers to confess that they were thieves, and they were condemned to disgrace. Although the story may be apocryphal, it shows that Vitruvius personally considered plagiarism reprehensible.

== Legal aspects ==
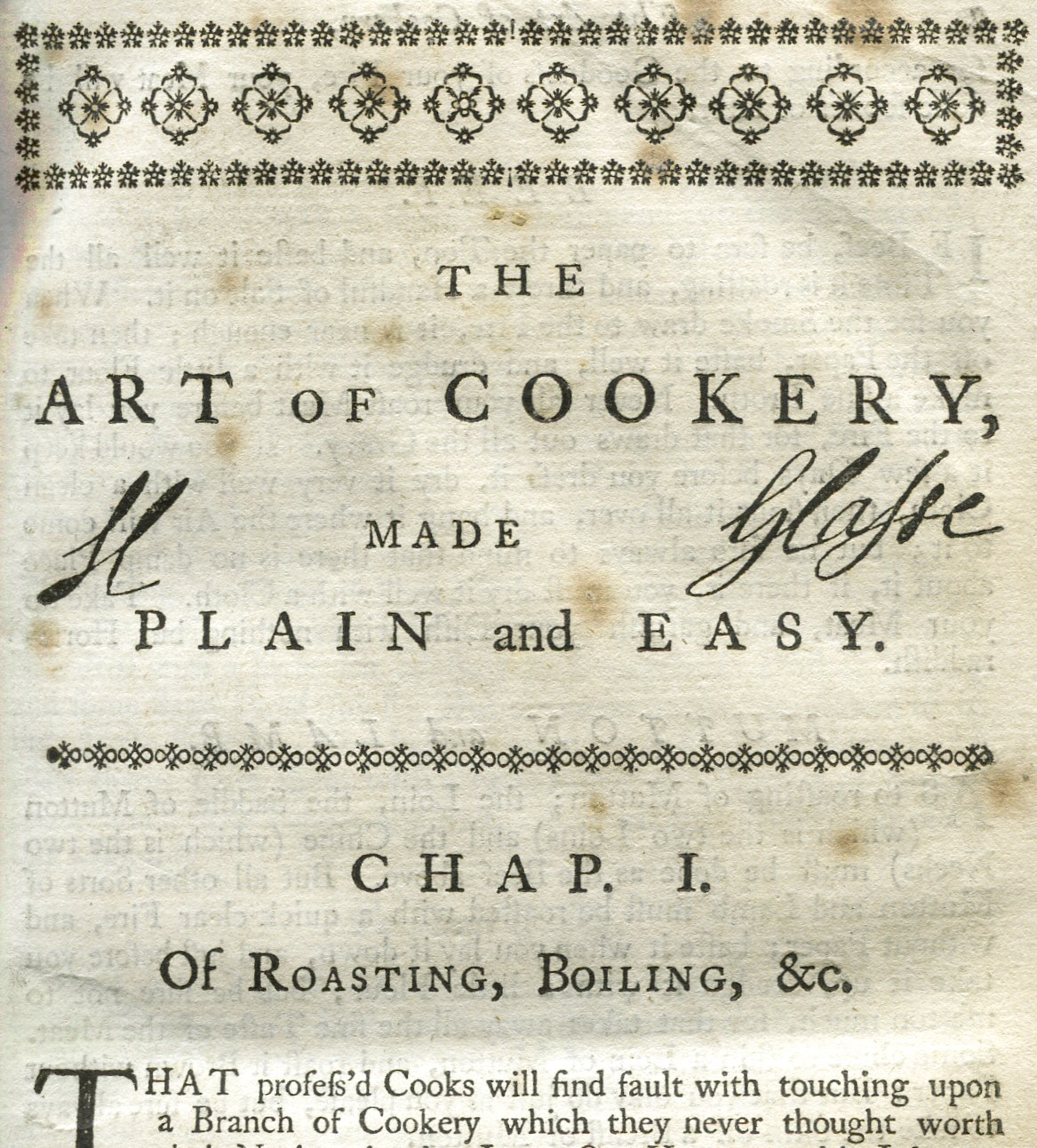
Hannah Glasse's signature at the top of the first chapter of her book, The Art of Cookery Made Plain and Easy, 6th Edition, 1758, an attempted defense against rampant plagiarism

Although plagiarism in some contexts is considered theft or stealing, the concept does not exist in a legal sense. The use of someone else's work in order to gain academic credit may however meet some legal definitions of fraud. "Plagiarism" specifically is not mentioned in any current statute, either criminal or civil. Some cases may be treated as unfair competition or a violation of the doctrine of moral rights. In short, people are asked to use the guideline, "if you did not write it yourself; you must give credit".

Plagiarism is not the same as copyright infringement. Although both terms may apply to a particular act, they are different concepts, and false claims of authorship generally constitute plagiarism regardless of whether the material is protected by copyright. Copyright infringement is a violation of the rights of a copyright holder, when material whose use is restricted by copyright is used without consent. Plagiarism, in contrast, is concerned with the unearned increment to the plagiarizing author's reputation, or the obtaining of academic credit, that is achieved through false claims of authorship. Thus, plagiarism is considered a moral offense against the plagiarist's audience (for example, a reader, listener, or teacher).

Plagiarism is also considered a moral offense against anyone who has provided the plagiarist with a benefit in exchange for what is specifically supposed to be original content (for example, the plagiarist's publisher, employer, or teacher). In such cases, acts of plagiarism may sometimes also form part of a claim for breach of the plagiarist's contract, or, if done knowingly, for a civil wrong.

There is a journal dedicated to the study of plagiarism, Plagiary: Cross-Disciplinary Studies in Plagiarism, Fabrication, and Falsification.

== In academia ==
Within academia, plagiarism by students, professors, or researchers is considered academic dishonesty or academic fraud, and offenders are subject to academic censure, up to and including expulsion for students and termination of contracts for professors and researchers.

Some institutions use plagiarism detection software to uncover potential plagiarism and to deter students from plagiarizing. However, plagiarism detection software does not always yield accurate results, and there are loopholes in these systems. Some universities address the issue of academic integrity by providing students with thorough orientation, including required writing courses and clearly articulated honor codes. Indeed, there is a virtually uniform understanding among college students that plagiarism is wrong. Nevertheless, each year a number of students are brought before their institutions' disciplinary boards on charges that they have misused sources in their schoolwork. However, the practice of plagiarizing by using sufficient word substitutions to elude detection software, known as Rogeting, has rapidly evolved. "Rogeting" is an informal neologism created to describe the act of modifying a published source by substituting synonyms for sufficient words to fool plagiarism detection software, often resulting in the creation of new meaningless phrases through extensive synonym swapping. The term, a reference to Roget's Thesaurus, coined by Chris Sadler, principal lecturer in business information systems at Middlesex University, who uncovered the practice in papers submitted by his students, though there is no scholarly evidence of Rogeting more broadly, as little specific research has been conducted.

Another form of plagiarism known as "contract cheating" involves students paying someone else, such as an essay mill, to do their work for them. As of 2021, few parts of the world have legislation that prohibits the operation or the promotion of contract cheating services.

Because it is predicated upon an expected level of learning and comprehension having been achieved, all associated academic accreditation becomes seriously undermined if plagiarism is allowed to become the norm within academic submissions.

For professors and researchers, plagiarism is punished by sanctions ranging from suspension to termination, along with the loss of credibility and perceived integrity. Charges of plagiarism against students and professors are typically heard by internal disciplinary committees, by which students and professors have agreed to be bound. Plagiarism is a common reason for academic research papers to be retracted. Library science is developing approaches to address the issue of plagiarism at institutional levels.

Scholars of plagiarism include Rebecca Moore Howard, Susan Blum, Tracey Bretag, and Sarah Elaine Eaton.

There is a moral implication to plagiarism in that it takes for granted other people's time, work, and effort. This deontological scrutiny of plagiarism is important to the debate on the ethics of plagiarism. Doctor Amy Robillard poses the metaphor that "plagiarism is theft", and believes that the ethics of that statement are important for schooling and academia. Work that has been plagiarized could be considered intellectual property, and so to plagiarize would constitute copyright or intellectual property infringement. However, some consider plagiarism to have a deeper context in which writings are to be considered property, and hence a work's unlawful usage by plagiarists would constitute theft and has ethical implications in academia and elsewhere.

No universally adopted definition of academic plagiarism exists. However, this section provides several definitions to exemplify the most common characteristics of academic plagiarism. It has been called "The use of ideas, concepts, words, or structures without appropriately acknowledging the source to benefit in a setting where originality is expected."

This is an abridged version of Teddi Fishman's definition of plagiarism, which proposed five elements characteristic of plagiarism. According to Fishman, plagiarism occurs when someone:

Uses words, ideas, or work products attributable to another identifiable person or source without attributing the work to the source from which it was obtained in a situation in which there is a legitimate expectation of original authorship in order to obtain some benefit, credit, or gain which need not be monetary.

Furthermore, plagiarism is defined differently among institutions of higher learning and universities:

- At Stanford it is the "use, without giving reasonable and appropriate credit to or acknowledging the author or source, of another person's original work, whether such work is made up of code, formulas, ideas, language, research, strategies, writing or other form".
- At Yale it is the "use of another's work, words, or ideas without attribution", which includes "using a source's language without quoting, using information from a source without attribution, and paraphrasing a source in a form that stays too close to the original".
- At Princeton it is the "deliberate" use of "someone else's language, ideas, or other original (not common-knowledge) material without acknowledging its source".
- At Oxford College of Emory University it is the use of "a writer's ideas or phraseology without giving due credit".
- At Brown it is "appropriating another person's ideas or words (spoken or written) without attributing those word or ideas to their true source".
- At the U.S. Naval Academy it is "the use of the words, information, insights, or ideas of another without crediting that person through proper citation".

=== Forms of academic plagiarism ===
Different classifications of academic plagiarism forms have been proposed. Many classifications follow a behavioral approach by seeking to classify the actions undertaken by plagiarists.

For example, a 2015 survey of teachers and professors by Turnitin identified 10 main forms of plagiarism that students commit:

- Submitting someone's work as their own.
- Taking passages from their own previous work without adding citations (self-plagiarism).
- Re-writing someone's work without properly citing sources.
- Using quotations but not citing the source.
- Interweaving various sources together in the work without citing.
- Citing some, but not all, passages that should be cited.
- Melding together cited and uncited sections of the piece.
- Providing proper citations, but failing to change the structure and wording of the borrowed ideas enough (close paraphrasing).
- Inaccurately citing a source.
- Relying too heavily on other people's work, failing to bring original thought into the text.

The authors of a 2019 systematic literature review on academic plagiarism detection derived a four-leven typology of academic plagiarism, from the total words of a language (lexis), from its syntax, from its semantics, and from methods to capture plagiarism of ideas and structures. The typology categorizes plagiarism forms according to the layer of the model they affect:

- Characters-preserving plagiarism
  - Verbatim copying without proper citation
- Syntax-preserving plagiarism
  - Synonym substitution
  - Technical disguise (e.g., using identically looking glyphs from another alphabet)
- Semantics-preserving plagiarism
  - Translation
  - Paraphrase
- Idea-preserving plagiarism
  - Appropriation of ideas or concepts
  - Reusing text structure
- Ghostwriting
  - Collusion (typically among students)
  - Contract cheating

=== Factors influencing students' decisions to plagiarize ===
Several studies investigated factors predicting the decision to plagiarize. For example, a panel study with students from German universities found that academic procrastination predicts the frequency plagiarism conducted within six months followed the measurement of academic procrastination. It has been argued that by plagiarizing, students cope with the negative consequences that result from academic procrastination such as poor grades. Another study found that plagiarism is more frequent if students perceive plagiarism as beneficial and if they have the opportunity to plagiarize. When students had expected higher sanctions and when they had internalized social norms that define plagiarism as very objectionable, plagiarism was less likely to occur. Another study found that students resorted to plagiarism in order to cope with heavy workloads imposed by teachers. On the other hand, in that study, some teachers also thought that plagiarism is a consequence of their own failure to propose creative tasks and activities.

=== Sanctions for student plagiarism ===
In the academic world, plagiarism by students is usually considered a very serious offense that can result in punishments such as a failing grade on the particular assignment, the entire course, or even being expelled from the institution. The seriousness with which academic institutions address student plagiarism may be tempered by a recognition that students may not fully understand what plagiarism is. A 2015 study showed that students who were new to university study did not have a good understanding of even the basic requirements of how to attribute sources in written academic work, yet students were very confident that they understood what referencing and plagiarism are. The same students also had a lenient view of how plagiarism should be penalised.

For cases of repeated plagiarism, or for cases in which a student commits severe plagiarism (e.g., purchasing an assignment), suspension or expulsion may occur. There has been historic concern about inconsistencies in penalties administered for university student plagiarism, and a plagiarism tariff was devised in 2008 for UK higher education institutions in an attempt to encourage some standardization of approaches.

The Open University in the UK has also noted that students who make their work available to others will be seen as "demonstrat[ing] poor academic conduct" and that such enabling action may also open up students to penalties within their institution.

=== Impact of technology ===
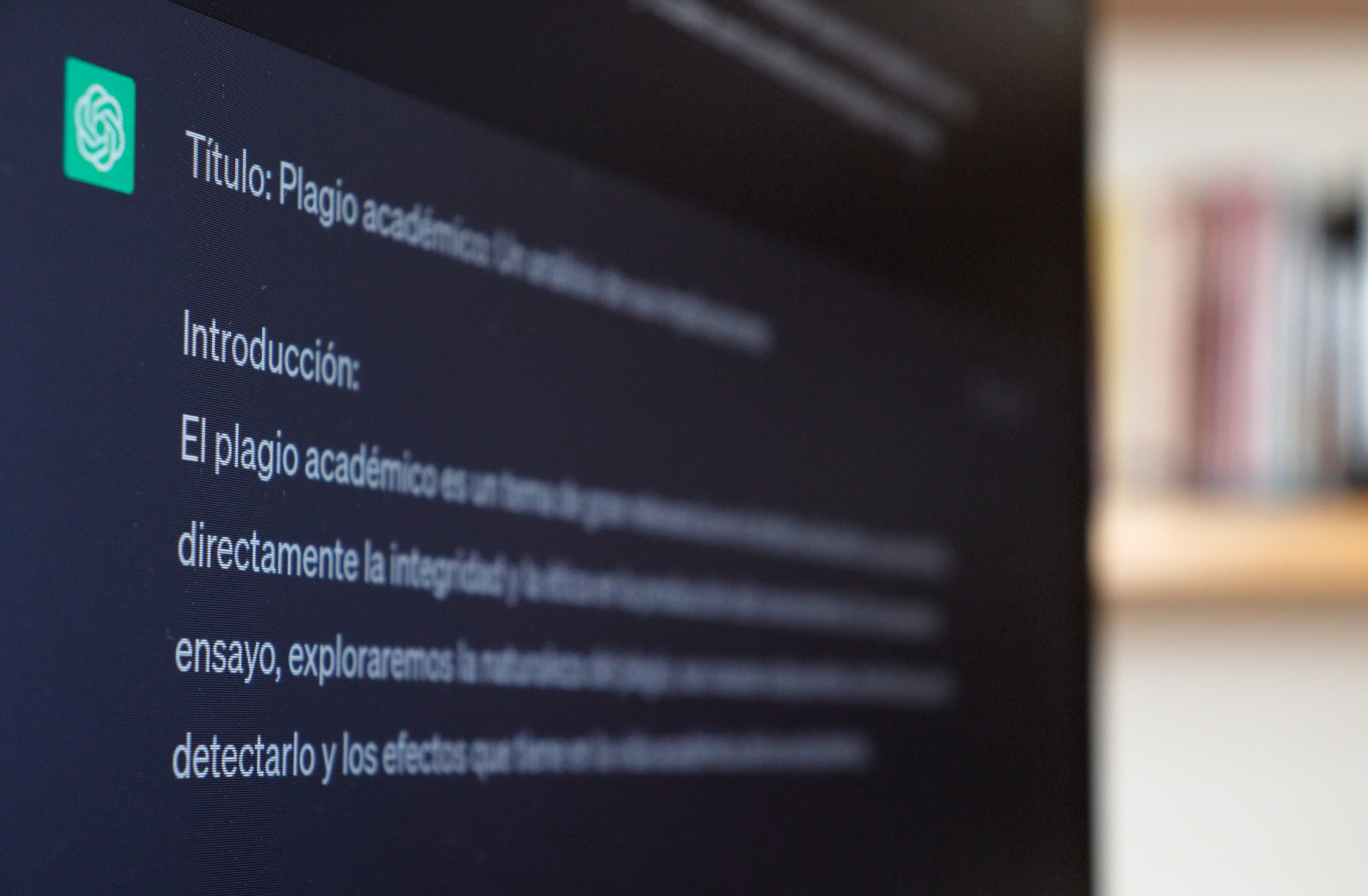
ChatGPT being prompted to write an essay. Generative AI is often used to commit plagiarism.

Expanding accessibility and usage of the internet has a positive correlation with plagiarism. However, a Croatian study found that students were not more likely to plagiarize when using an electronic-writing medium. Easy access to information has made it much simpler for students to copy and paste information from the internet without crediting the original author. Educational institutions often emphasize the importance of originality, proper citation, and academic integrity to combat plagiarism. They implement policies, educational programs, and tools like plagiarism detection software to discourage and detect instances of plagiarism. A 2012 survey of U.S. high schools found 32% of students admitted to copying an assignment from the Internet.

=== Plagiarism detection ===
Strategies faculty members use to detect plagiarism include carefully reading students work and making note of inconsistencies in student writing and of citation errors, and providing plagiarism prevention education to students. It has been found that a significant share of university instructors do not use detection methods such as using text-matching software. A few more try to detect plagiarism by reading term-papers specifically for plagiarism, although the latter method might be not very effective in detecting plagiarism – especially when plagiarism from unfamiliar sources needs to be detected. There are checklists of tactics to prevent student plagiarism.

==== Plagiarism detection systems ====
Turnitin, an internet-based plagiarism detection service, emerged as a digital platform in 1995 and quickly dominated the market. Turnitin serves more than 30 million students worldwide across over 10,000 institutions in 135 countries, and has been utilized by over 1.6 million instructors.

When evaluating an article, Turnitin uses artificial intelligence to generate both formative and summative assessments. The formative assessment is meant to provide instructors with a basic evaluation of the student's level of achievement, while the summative assessment represents its final evaluative judgment of the writing. According to Turnitin, the "Turnitin Scoring Engine" generating these mainly focuses on analyzing patterns in previously evaluated essays. It also rates the readability of content and the writer's familiarity with the genre, based on an evaluation of word usage, genre conventions, and sentence structure. The final report page highlights potentially plagiarised sections to help instructors identify the corresponding content.

Despite its technological advancements, Turnitin has some limitations. A Croatian study found that "small"-language (languages with less of a digital footprint) written material is not supported by the larger base of plagiarism-detection tools, and that languages with more of a digital footprint and more outreach tend to be better supported. The generation of reports by Turnitin, which involves comparing and scoring vast amounts of student work, can potentially infringe on copyright laws. Turnitin monitors students to ensure that their work is original and unique, with this validation process being carried out by a supervising machine. However, this practice can result in unrestricted access to student data for teachers, institutions, and governments and lead to severe copyright infringement issues.

Furthermore, plagiarism detection systems (PDS), especially when used for grading purposes, have certain drawbacks. While Turnitin can identify matching texts, it does not provide a clear definition of plagiarism, leaving potential disputes for individual interpretation. For example, different instructors may interpret the same report with varying explanations. The extent of plagiarism can vary significantly, ranging from a single paragraph to multiple instances within a five to six page paper. Without a rigorous standard that defines plagiarism, instructors defining plagiarism based on their own understanding can lead to confusion and conflicts.

=== Plagiarism education ===
Though widely employed in high schools and universities, plagiarism detection tools create a delicate environment in the classroom, as they place instructors in the role of guardians of ethical principles, establishing an adversarial relationship between teachers and students. These tools presuppose that students are prone to plagiarizing and that instructors should use advanced techniques to uncover it. Such scrutiny can cause students to feel afraid and disempowered, as they may consider these tools as omnipotent monitors. The WriteCheck reviews demonstrate that students may be afraid of being caught, leading to writing with pressure and anxiety. These reviews highlight the power dynamics and the culture of fear around plagiarism in the classroom. Additionally, inherent power imbalances between instructors and students exist since students may feel obligated to submit their work to Turnitin for evaluation. Furthermore, Turnitin endeavors to promote Western writing values globally. It inherently promotes standardized writing around the world, advancing Western ideas of authorship and EAE, which reinforce harmful ideologies that impact writing instructors.

In general, plagiarism detection systems deter rather than detect plagiarism, but they do not reflect the ultimate educational objectives. Given the serious consequences that plagiarism has for students, there has been a call for a greater emphasis on learning in order to help students avoid committing plagiarism. This is especially important when students move to a new institution that may have a different view of the concept when compared with the view previously developed by the student. Indeed, given the seriousness of plagiarism accusations for a student's future, the pedagogy of plagiarism education may need to be considered ahead of the pedagogy of the discipline being studied. The need for plagiarism education extends to academic staff, who may not completely understand what is expected of their students or the consequences of misconduct. Actions to reduce plagiarism include coordinating teaching activities to decrease student load, reducing memorization, increasing individual practical activities, and promoting positive reinforcement over punishment. A student may opt to plagiarize due to a lack of research methods, knowledge of citation practices, or an excessive workload. To eventually reduce plagiarism, students should be educated about the ethical and legal concerns surrounding these tools, and teachers should devise suitable and innovative assignments that require more independent thinking.

One study showed that students warned about plagiarism and its penalties were less likely to plagiarize. Also, in that study, students who were intentionally avoiding plagiarism wrote less on average, which was suspected to lead to reduced quality of work.

To minimize plagiarism in the digital era, it is crucial that students understand the definition of plagiarism and how important intellectual property rights are. Students should be aware that correct attribution is required to prevent the accusation of plagiarism and that the ethical and legal rules that apply to printed materials also apply to electronic information.

== In journalism ==
In journalism, plagiarism is considered a breach of journalistic ethics, and reporters caught plagiarizing typically face disciplinary measures ranging from suspension to termination of employment. Some individuals caught plagiarizing in academic or journalistic contexts claim that they plagiarized unintentionally, by failing to include quotations or to give the appropriate citation. Although plagiarism in scholarship and journalism has a centuries-old history, the development of the Internet, where articles appear as electronic text, has made the physical act of copying the work of others much easier.

Because journalism relies on the public trust, a reporter's failure to acknowledge sources honestly undercuts a newspaper or television news show's integrity and undermines its credibility. Journalists accused of plagiarism are often suspended from their reporting tasks while the charges are being investigated by the news organization.

== In the arts ==
=== The history of the arts ===
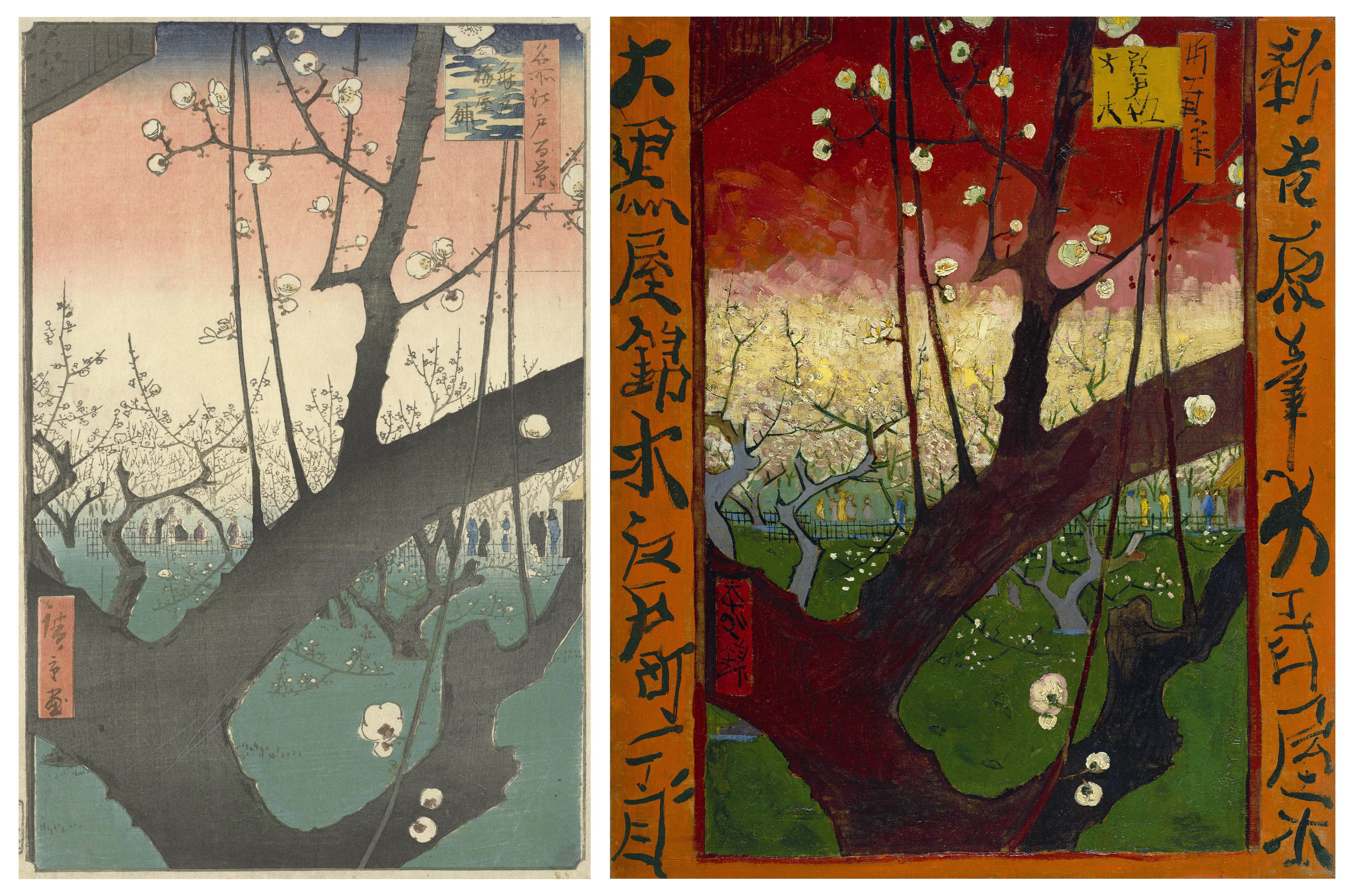
Comparison of a woodblock print by Hiroshige (left) to its copy by Vincent van Gogh

Through all of the history of literature and of the arts in general, works of art are to a large extent repetitions of the tradition; to the entire history of artistic creativity belong plagiarism, literary theft, appropriation, incorporation, retelling, rewriting, recapitulation, revision, reprise, thematic variation, ironic retake, parody, imitation, stylistic theft, pastiches, collages, and deliberate assemblages. There is no rigorous and precise distinction between practices like imitation, stylistic plagiarism, copy, replica and forgery. These appropriation procedures are the main axis of a literate culture, in which the tradition of the canonic past is being constantly rewritten.

Publishing another's art as one's own is sometimes called "art theft", particularly online. This usage has little direct relationship to the theft of physical works of art.

Ruth Graham quotes T. S. Eliot—"Immature poets imitate; mature poets steal. Bad poets deface what they take."—she notes that despite the "taboo" of plagiarism, the ill-will and embarrassment it causes in the modern context, readers seem to often forgive the past excesses of historic literary offenders.

=== Praisings of artistic plagiarism ===
A passage of Laurence Sterne's 1767 Tristram Shandy condemns plagiarism by resorting to plagiarism. Oliver Goldsmith commented:

Sterne's Writings, in which it is clearly shewn, that he, whose manner and style were so long thought original, was, in fact, the most unhesitating plagiarist who ever cribbed from his predecessors in order to garnish his own pages. It must be owned, at the same time, that Sterne selects the materials of his mosaic work with so much art, places them so well, and polishes them so highly, that in most cases we are disposed to pardon the want of originality, in consideration of the exquisite talent with which the borrowed materials are wrought up into the new form.

A common turn of phrase, variously attributed to William Faulkner, Pablo Picasso, T. S. Eliot, and Steve Jobs, among others, claims that "good artists copy, great artists steal." Though this phrase appears to be praising artistic plagiarism, it is more commonly taken to refer to constructively iterating upon the work of others, and being transparent about one's influences.

== Self-plagiarism ==
The reuse of significant, identical, or nearly identical portions of one's own work without acknowledging that one is doing so or citing the original work is sometimes described as self-plagiarism or recycling fraud. Scholarly articles of this nature are often referred to as duplicate or multiple publication.

Self-plagiarism is considered a serious ethical issue in settings where someone asserts that a publication consists of new material, such as in publishing or factual documentation.

Identifying self-plagiarism is often difficult because limited reuse of material is accepted both legally (as fair use) and ethically.

In addition, there can be a copyright issue if copyright of the prior work has been transferred to another entity. Many people (mostly, but not limited to critics of copyright and intellectual property) do not believe it is possible to plagiarize oneself. Critics of the concepts of plagiarism and copyright may use the idea of self-plagiarism as a reductio ad absurdum argument.

=== Contested definition ===
Miguel Roig has written at length about the topic of self-plagiarism and his definition of self-plagiarism as using previously disseminated work is widely accepted among scholars of the topic. However, the term self-plagiarism has been challenged as being self-contradictory, an oxymoron, and on other grounds.

For example, Stephanie J. Bird argues that self-plagiarism is a misnomer, since by definition plagiarism concerns the use of others' material. Bird identifies the ethical issues of "self-plagiarism" as those of "dual or redundant publication". She also notes that in an educational context, self-plagiarism refers to the case of a student who resubmits "the same essay for credit in two different courses." As David B. Resnik clarifies, "Self-plagiarism involves dishonesty but not intellectual theft."

According to Patrick M. Scanlon, self-plagiarism is a term with some specialized currency. Most prominently, it is used in discussions of research and publishing integrity in biomedicine, where heavy publish-or-perish demands have led to a rash of duplicate and "salami-slicing" publication, the reporting of a single study's results in "least publishable units" within multiple articles. Roig (2002) has offered a useful classification system including four types of self-plagiarism: duplicate publication of an article in more than one journal; partitioning of one study into multiple publications, often called salami-slicing; text recycling; and copyright infringement.

=== Codes of ethics ===
Some academic journals have codes of ethics that specifically refer to self-plagiarism (e.g., the Journal of International Business Studies). Some professional organizations such as the Association for Computing Machinery (ACM) have created policies that deal specifically with self-plagiarism. Other organizations, such as the American Political Science Association (APSA), do not make specific reference to self-plagiarism. The organization published a code of ethics that describes plagiarism as "deliberate appropriation of the works of others represented as one's own". It does not make any reference to self-plagiarism. It does say that when a thesis or dissertation is published "in whole or in part", the author is "not ordinarily under an ethical obligation to acknowledge its origins". The American Society for Public Administration (ASPA) also published a code of ethics that says its members are committed to: "Ensure[ing] that others receive credit for their work and contributions", but it makes no reference to self-plagiarism.

=== Factors that justify reuse ===
Pamela Samuelson, in 1994, identified several factors she says excuse reuse of one's previously published work, that make it not self-plagiarism. She relates each of these factors specifically to the ethical issue of self-plagiarism, as distinct from the legal issue of fair use of copyright, which she deals with separately. Among other factors that may excuse reuse of previously published material Samuelson lists the following:

- The previous work must be restated to lay the groundwork for a new contribution in the second work.
- Portions of the previous work must be repeated to deal with new evidence or arguments.
- The audience for each work is so different that publishing the same work in different places is necessary to get the message out.
- The author thinks they said it so well the first time that it makes no sense to say it differently a second time.

Samuelson states she has relied on the "different audience" rationale when attempting to bridge interdisciplinary communities. She refers to writing for different legal and technical communities, saying: "there are often paragraphs or sequences of paragraphs that can be bodily lifted from one article to the other. And, in truth, I lift them." She refers to her own practice of converting "a technical article into a law review article with relatively few changes—adding footnotes and one substantive section" for a different audience.

Samuelson describes misrepresentation as the basis of self-plagiarism. She also states "Although it seems not to have been raised in any of the self-plagiarism cases, copyright law's fair use defense would likely provide a shield against many potential publisher claims of copyright infringement against authors who reused portions of their previous works."

== In other contexts ==
=== Organizational publications ===
Plagiarism is presumably not an issue when organizations issue collective unsigned works since they do not assign credit for originality to particular people. For example, the American Historical Association's "Statement on Standards of Professional Conduct" (2005) regarding textbooks and reference books stated that, because textbooks and encyclopedias are summaries of other scholars' work, they are not bound by the same exacting standards of attribution as original research and may be allowed a greater "extent of dependence" on other works. However, even such a book does not make use of words, phrases, or paragraphs from another text or follow too closely the other text's arrangement and organization, and the authors of such texts are also expected to "acknowledge the sources of recent or distinctive findings and interpretations, those not yet a part of the common understanding of the profession."

=== Reverse plagiarism ===
Reverse plagiarism, or attribution without copying, refers to falsely giving authorship credit over a work to a person who did not author it, or falsely claiming a source supports an assertion that the source does not make. Although both the term and activity are relatively rare, incidents of reverse plagiarism do occur typically in similar contexts as traditional plagiarism.

== Impact of artificial intelligence ==
The increase in plagiarism can also be attributed to developments in artificial intelligence. The emergence of large language models (LLMs) such as GPT-3 and ChatGPT raised global discussion about the impact of artificial intelligence on writing and plagiarism. One such innovation is the GPT-2 model, which is capable of generating coherent paragraphs and achieving high scores on various language modeling assessments. It can also perform basic tasks such as reading comprehension, machine translation, question answering, and summarization. Currently, detectors of AI language such as GPTZero have been introduced to cope with this problem. Noam Chomsky called ChatGPT "nothing more than high-tech plagiarism". In contrast, others have proposed that "the essay is dead", declaring that artificial intelligence will transform academia and society. One scholar of plagiarism, Sarah Elaine Eaton, proposed the idea of a "postplagiarism era", in which human and artificial-intelligence hybrid writing become normal.

The impact of artificial intelligence on plagiarism has yet to be fully understood, but LLMs have triggered a huge wave of content automation and this poses a risk of saturation of the internet. A 2024 study from researchers in Singapore shows how this misuse of artificial intelligence for automated content creation at scale could lead to a 'Plagiarism Singularity' in the near future, where most original work would also be marked as plagiarised due to a massive amount of artificially generated content on the internet.

Disputes have also arisen over AI companies' use of material generated by other AI systems. In January 2022, the blockchain company Voiceverse admitted to using voice clips from 15.ai without attribution, and presenting the audio as a demonstration of its own technology, a controversy that became known as the Voiceverse NFT plagiarism scandal. In January 2025, OpenAI suggested that DeepSeek had used its models to train a competing system via knowledge distillation, although it did not disclose specific evidence for this.

== See also ==
- Article spinning
- Counterfeit consumer good
- Credit (creative arts)
- Cryptomnesia
- Détournement
- Joke theft
- Journalistic scandal (plagiarism, fabrication, omission)
- Library theft
- List of scientific misconduct incidents
- Music plagiarism
- Neoism
- Peer review
- Plagiarism from Wikipedia
- Spin-off
- Scientific misconduct
- Scientific plagiarism in India
- Source criticism
- Swipe (comics)

== Works cited ==
- Arnau, Frank Translation from the German by Brownjohn, J. Maxwell (1961). The Art of the Faker. Little, Brown and Company.
- Derrida, Jacques, Roudinesco, Élisabeth [2001] (2004) De Quoi Demain, English translation 2004 by Jeff Fort as For what tomorrow—: a dialogue, ch.4 Unforeseeable Freedom
- Blum, Susan D. My Word!: Plagiarism and College Culture (2010)
- Eco, Umberto (1987) Fakes and Forgeries in Versus, Issues 46–48, republished in 1990 in The limits of interpretation pp. 174–202
- Eco, Umberto (1990) Interpreting Serials in The limits of interpretation, pp. 83–100, excerpt; link unavailable
- Gérard Genette (1982) Palimpsests: literature in the second degree
- Haywood, Ian (1987) Faking it
- Hutcheon, Linda (1985). "3. The Pragmatic Range of Parody". A Theory of Parody: The Teachings of Twentieth-Century Art Forms. New York: Methuen. ISBN 978-0-252-06938-3.
- Joachimides, Christos M. and Rosenthal, Norman and Anfam, David and Adams, Brooks (1993) American art in the 20th century: painting and sculpture 1913–1993
- Paull, Harry Major (1928) Literary ethics: a study in the growth of the literary conscience Part II, ch.X Parody and Burlesque pp. 133–40 (public domain work, author died in 1934)
- Royal Shakespeare Company (2007) The RSC Shakespeare – William Shakespeare Complete Works, Introduction to the Comedy of Errors
- Ruthven, K. K. (2001) Faking Literature
- Spearing, A. C. (1987) Introduction section to Chaucer's The Franklin's Prologue and Tale
- Spearing, A. C. (1989) Readings in medieval poetry
- Steiner, George (1998) After Babel, ch.6 Topologies of culture, 3rd revised edition
