= International Publisher Ltd. =

Russian paper mill

International Publisher Ltd. (or International Publisher LLC) is an academic paper mill company that coordinates the sale of fake authorships on research papers for publication in an academic journal. The company is headquartered in Moscow (Russia) with offices in Ukraine, Kazakhstan, and Iran, and lists its chief editor as Ksenia Badziun. Its website has existed since 2018.

Buyers can preselect a number of critera for their desired article. Many papers are created specifically for the purpose of selling co-authorships, and only after a sufficient number of slots are sold, and the company recruits writers to produce at least some of these papers. Others may be otherwise legitimate articles; there is evidence that it also approaches authors published in high-quality journals to sell co-authorship slots. Slots are priced according to the prestige of the journal and the position of the slot in the list of purported collaborators.

== Discovery and investigation ==
The company was exposed by scientific misconduct tracking website Retraction Watch in 2019. In 2022, a report on arXiv was covered by Science Magazine detailing how International Publisher Ltd. had published hundreds of academic papers across diverse academic journals, including from respected publishing companies. Some of these publishers have opened an investigation into the matter. In 2019, the scientific indexing company Clarivate's Web of Science group sent International Publisher Ltd. a cease-and-desist letter, which was ignored.

== See more ==
- Research paper mill
