= Academic integrity =

Moral code or ethical policy of academia

Academic integrity is a moral code or ethical policy of academia. Academic integrity supports the enactment of educational values through behaviours such as the avoidance of cheating, plagiarism, and contract cheating, as well as the maintenance of academic standards; honesty and rigor in research and academic publishing.

The term was popularized by Rutgers University professor Donald McCabe who is considered to be the "grandfather of academic integrity". Other academic integrity scholars and advocates include Tracey Bretag (Australia), Cath Ellis (Australia), Sarah Elaine Eaton (Canada), Thomas Lancaster (UK), Tomáš Foltýnek (Czech Republic), and Tricia Bertram Gallant (US).

== History ==
During the late 18th century in the United States academic integrity was tightly correlated to the academic honor code. This was monitored mainly by the students and surrounding culture of the time. The honor code focused on duty, pride, power, and self-esteem. Any act promoting the uprising or building of any of these within an individual was the goal. Thus, academic integrity was tied solely to the status and appearance of upstanding character of the individual. Any acts of academic dishonesty performed to maintain their good name was seen as a necessary means to an end.

By the end of the 19th century when the goals of the university changed that the concept of academic integrity changed. Academics of this era were required to teach and produce original research. The pressure to acquire tenure and publish added extra stress to their jobs, though acts of academic dishonesty were viewed as acts of follies. Still, the honor code concept of academic integrity was evolving into a more contemporary concept. Academic integrity began to replace honor of the individual honor to the university as an institution. Such an evolution was important to promote unity throughout the academic institution and encourage students to hold each other accountable for dishonest acts. It also allowed the students to feel empowered through the self-monitoring of each other.

As the importance of original research grew among faculty members the questioning of research integrity grew as well. With pressure linked to their professional status professor were under intense scrutiny by the surrounding society. This inevitably led to the separating academic integrity ideals for student and faculty. By 1970 most universities in the United States had established honor codes for their student body and faculty members, although this concept is less prevalent elsewhere in the world. By the early 2020s, there were indications that honor codes diminishing in popularity, though they remain prevalent at many US higher education institutions.

Improvements in information technology have created challenges within academic integrity, especially with respect to increased plagiarism and use of poor-quality sources found on the internet. Technology has also increased opportunities for collaborative writing, raising issues of proper attribution of authorship. There are also problems with hyperauthorship, selling authorship, and unearned authorship.

=== Impact of generative artificial intelligence ===
The popularization of generative artificial intelligence (GenAI) apps in education prompted global reconsiderations of policies and procedures relating to plagiarism and other breaches of academic integrity. The impact of large language models (LLMs) has impacted discussions of plagiarism and what constitutes ethical student learning.

Although some scholars claim that GenAI exacerbates academic misconduct, others argue that use of GenAI tools does not automatically constitute a breach of academic integrity. There is currently no consensus about whether GenAI is responsible for a decrease in academic integrity.

In Ireland, guidance from the Higher Education Authority on generative AI in higher education addressed academic integrity, assessment and transparency. Several academic journals require an AI disclosure prepared by authors and included in the manuscript.

== Impact on academia ==
Academic integrity means avoiding plagiarism and cheating, among other misconduct behaviours. Academic integrity is practiced in the majority of educational institutions, it is noted in mission statements, policies, procedures, and honor codes, but it is also being taught in ethics classes and being noted in syllabi. Many universities have sections on their websites devoted to academic integrity which define what the term means to their specific institution. An honor pledge created before an assignment that is signed by students can help increase academic integrity.

Universities have moved toward an inclusive approach to inspiring academic integrity, by creating Student Honor Councils as well as taking a more active role in making students aware of the consequences for academic dishonesty.

To promote the academic integrity, publication ethics, and responsible research in the higher education system in India, the University Grants Commission (India) enacted the "UGC (Promotion of Academic Integrity and Prevention of Plagiarism in Higher Educational Institutions) Regulations, 2018" on July 23, 2018. The Regulations then recommend some institutional mechanisms to eliminate the scope of plagiarism.

Despite these advances, academic misconduct continues to preoccupy policy makers and educators all over the world. In the 1990s, the academic dishonesty rates were as bad as, and in some cases, worse than they were in the 1960s. The acknowledgement of this ethics crisis is inspiring many universities to focus more on promoting common values of academic integrity.

Conversely, critics have drawn attention to the fact that "teaching and learning are interrupted because faculty, in an effort to control plagiarism and protect notions of intellectual capital, are forced to engage with the students as detectives rather than as teachers, advisors, or mentors. The focus on controlling plagiarism among students is critiqued as unnecessarily legalistic and the rules more rigid than those necessarily accorded to intellectual property law (Marsh, 2004)". Similarly, contributions made from a societal perspective question or critique previously unexamined assumptions of the "inherent goodness, universality, and absoluteness of independence, originality, and authorship (Valentine, 2006). Authors who write about the societal dimension such as Ede and Lundsford (2001) do not suggest the elimination of notions of individual authorship and the unconditional acceptance of copying and collaboration in its place. Rather, the societal dimension highlights the need to consider both and the importance of deconstructing how the idea of the "individual author" might be serving (or not serving) the goals of teaching (learning), service, and research. Postsecondary education institutions are urged to step back from the mindless or fear-based ready adoption of the "turnitin culture" (Maruca, 2005) to allow for such question asking in the spirit of enhancing academic integrity and the teaching and learning environment."

== Academic integrity policies and procedures ==
It is important for schools and higher education institutions to have clear academic integrity policies and procedures to address breaches of student academic conduct expectations.

Six core elements of academic integrity policies have been identified as: access, approach, responsibility, detail, support, and equity. Academic integrity policies should clearly define what counts as a violation of academic integrity (e.g., plagiarism, exam cheating, contract cheating, and so on). Policies should be accessible to administrators, staff, and students and should outline the responsibilities for reporting, investigation, and academic misconduct case management. Policies should provide sufficient detail so as to be clear, but not too much detail so as to avoid confusing the reader. Academic integrity policies should be supported by procedures, and educational materials to help students understand what is expected of them.

Historical approaches to academic integrity policy have been punitive and focused on punishment of students for misconduct. Since the early 2000s, there has been increasing interest in more supportive approaches such as the use of restorative justice and providing educational supports to help students build academic literacy skills.

== Global perspectives on academic integrity ==
There is no singular or universal definition of academic integrity or related concepts, such as plagiarism. Although English-speaking countries such as the United States, Australia, Canada, and the UK have dominated academic integrity discourse, there are emerging perspectives from non-Anglo countries that are providing updated insights and broader perspectives. Experts from Latin America, Africa, Asia, and the Middle East are making important contributions to the global discourse on academic integrity.

== See also ==
- Academic dishonesty
- Accreditation mill
- Contract cheating
- Diploma mill
- Exam proctoring
- Grade inflation
- Plagiarism
- Scientific integrity
