= Victoria Strauss =

American novelist

- Born: 1955 (age 70–71); Exeter, New Hampshire, U.S.
- Education: Vassar College
- Occupation: Writer
- Writing career
- Language: English

Victoria Strauss (born 1955 in Exeter, New Hampshire) is the author of nine fantasy novels for adults and young adults, including the Stone series (The Arm of the Stone and The Garden of the Stone) and the Way of Arata series (The Burning Land and The Awakened City). She has written hundreds of book reviews for magazines and ezines, including SF Site and Fantasy magazine, and her articles on writing have appeared in Writer's Digest and elsewhere. In 2006, she served as a judge for the World Fantasy Awards.

An active member of the Science Fiction and Fantasy Writers of America, she is a co-founder, with AC Crispin, of the Committee on Writing Scams, and serves as its vice-chair. She maintains the Writer Beware website and blog, which provide information and warnings on writing related schemes, scams, and pitfalls. For this work, she received the SFWA Service Award in 2009. She was also honored in 2012 with an Independent Book Blogger Award.

Strauss studied Comparative Religion at Vassar College.

== Bibliography ==
- The Lady of Rhuddesmere (Frederick Warne, 1982)
- Worldstone (Four Winds Press, 1986)
- Guardian of the Hills (Morrow Junior Books, 1995)
- The Arm of the Stone (HarperCollins Eos, 1998; Phoenix Pick, 2011)
- The Garden of the Stone (Harpercollins Eos, 1999; Phoenix Pick, 2011)
- The Burning Land (HarperCollins Eos, 2004; Open Road Media, 2016)
- The Awakened City (HarperCollins Eos, 2006; Open Road Media, 2016)
- Passion Blue (Skyscape: Amazon Children's Publishing, 2012)
- Color Song (Skyscape: Amazon Children's Publishing, 2014)
