= Research paper mill =

Organisation that produces and sells fraudulent research manuscripts

In research, a paper mill is a business that produces poor quality or completely fraudulent journal papers that seem to resemble genuine research, as well as sells authorship on such papers.

Paper mills are an example of academic dishonesty that affects all fields of academic publishing including, but not limited to, academic writing, scientific writing and medical writing. Specifically, these can include data fabrication and contract cheating. These establishment represent a failure of research ethics and research integrity. The use of these publication services not only affects a company's credibility, but falsified publications cost companies millions of dollars through the withdrawal of stakeholders.

== Activities ==
In some cases, paper mills are sophisticated operations that sell authorship positions on legitimate but poor-quality research. Often, however, the papers contain fraudulent data and can be heavily plagiarized or otherwise unprofessional. These services are advertised on platforms such as Facebook, Telegram and WhatsApp.

Paper mill research is often junk science: it can include data fabrication, contract cheating, academic ghostwriting and medical ghostwriting.

== History and prevalence ==
Research paper mills first emerged as a significant problem during the 2010s, though the earliest known papers attributed to paper mills are known from the 2000s, at least as early as 2004. In 2013, Science started investigating different journals. In 2014 COPE wrote an editorial raising concerns on agencies selling services, including authorship of pre-written manuscripts.

In 2013, Science published an investigation of various kinds of research misconduct in China, including scholars buying pre-written papers from an online catalogue to use as their own. According to a 2021 report in Nature, thousands of papers in academic journals had been traced to paper mills from China, Iran and Russia, and some journals were revamping their review processes. Chinese researchers were found to have the proportionally highest number of flagged papers with 36% of the total Chinese output being considered suspect, followed by Iran with 20%, Saudi Arabia with 16%, Egypt with 15%, and Pakistan and Malaysia with 13% each. The apparent prevalence of paper mills in China has been attributed to the heightened "publish or perish" pressure placed on academics and other scientific professionals in China, particularly on medical doctors and nurses, who are required to publish academic papers in order to receive promotions despite research not being a significant part of their job.

Differing estimates put the share of paper mill productions between 2% and 20% of published academic papers, with particularly severe problems in some areas of biomedicine. A data analysis completed by Nature, provided evidence that showed the scientific disciplines of medicine and biology have the most paper mill-originated articles. A 2026 study estimated using machine learning analysis that approximately 10% of recently published literature of cancer may be the product of paper mills, rising to over 20-22% for liver, gastric and bone cancer, with the number of published suspect papers haven risen exponentially from essentially zero flagged papers in 2000.

== Detection ==
A 2024 peer-reviewed forensic study showed that provenance-based image analysis can automatically cluster manuscripts that originate from the same paper mill, providing scalable evidence of systematic production.

Research paper mills tend to fabricate citations which cause them to be easier to detect. The International Association of Scientific, Technical, and Medical Publisher (STM) launched a tool to detect fraudulent scientific papers. This tool is a web application in which publishers can upload submitted papers to detect if they contain indications of fraudulence.

== Examples ==
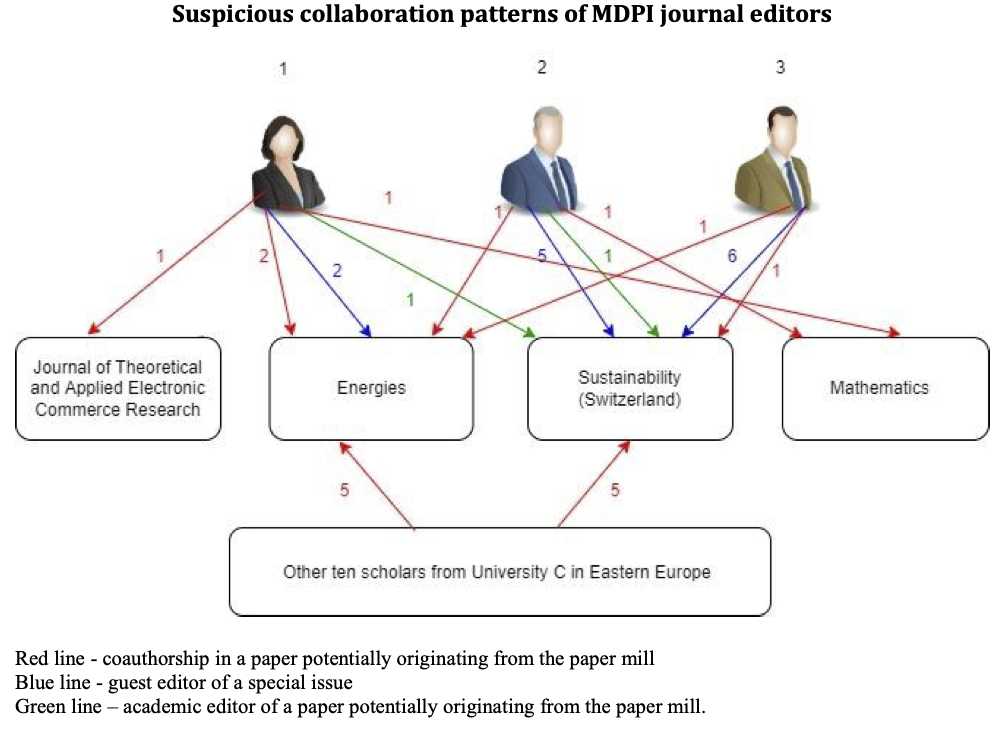
Depiction of a coordinated publishing ring associated with paper mill International Publisher Ltd. Figure 4 from Abalkina (2022).

In early 2022, Times Higher Education and the Science Magazine News department covered a report exposing a Russian paper mill company International Publisher Ltd. The report identified hundreds of published academic papers where positions for authorship had been sold through a Russian website allowing researchers to pay for academic prestige without requiring legitimate research contributions. During the three-year period analyzed, 419 articles were identified that were matched to manuscripts later published in many different academic journals, with a significant bias towards publications in predatory journals. While the paper mill targeted various journals, almost 100 papers were published in International Journal of Emerging Technologies in Learning (Kassel University Press) alone, seemingly coordinated through the involvement of journal editors hosting Special Issues with space for coauthors auctioned off for anywhere from $180–5000 USD. In a separate network, guest editors and salaried academic editors for MDPI were found to coordinate sale of authorship across four different MDPI journals, totaling over 20 papers (picture, right). Beyond collusion between editors and International Publisher Ltd., many legitimate research papers also sold authorship unknown to the journal editors, and were ultimately accepted in journals published by Elsevier, Oxford University Press, Springer Nature, Taylor & Francis, Wolters Kluwer, and Wiley-Blackwell. As of April 6, 2022, many of these publishers have opened an investigation into the matter.

In May 2024, the Wall Street Journal published a report on fake studies that affected New Jersey publisher Wiley. More than 11,300 papers were retracted, and 19 journals were reportedly closed. The problematic papers were linked to Hindawi, an Egyptian publisher of about 250 scientific journals that Wiley acquired in 2021. The article detailed how the research paper mill fraud worked, and highlighted individual efforts to identify and prevent future fraud. The article also warned that artificial intelligence was going to make fraud more difficult to detect. This is due to the fact that AI is now capable of making very realistic papers. The neuroscientist Christopher Bernard emphasized that AI now makes it faster for fraudulent papers to be published.

== See also ==
- Academic mill (disambiguation)
- Diploma mill
- Essay mill
- Research Integrity Risk Index
- Predatory publishing
- Publish or perish
