= Retraction Watch =

Blog covering scientific paper retractions

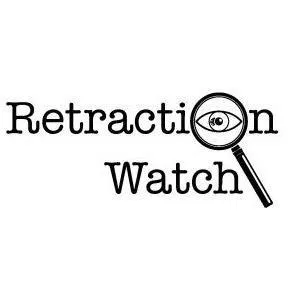
- Website type: Blog
- Available in: English
- Owner: Center for Scientific Integrity
- Website: retractionwatch.com
- Commercial: No
- Launched: August 2010

Retraction Watch is a blog that reports on retractions of scientific papers and on related topics. The blog was launched in August 2010 and is produced by science writers Ivan Oransky (Former Vice President, Editorial Medscape) and Adam Marcus (editor of Gastroenterology & Endoscopy News). Its parent organization is The Center for Scientific Integrity (CSI), a US 501(c)(3) nonprofit organization.

Retraction Watch won the 2024 Council of Science Editors Award for Meritorious Achievement.

== Motivation and scope ==
In 2011, Oransky and Marcus pointed out in Nature that the peer review process for scholarly publications continues long after the publication date. They were motivated to launch Retraction Watch to encourage this continuation and to increase the transparency of the retraction process. They observed that retractions of papers generally are not announced, that the reasons for retractions are not publicized, and that other researchers or the public who are unaware of the retraction may make decisions based on invalid results. Oransky described an example of a paper published in Proceedings of the National Academy of Sciences that reported a potential role for a drug against some types of breast cancers. Although the paper was later retracted, its retraction was not reported in media outlets that had earlier reported its positive conclusions, with a company having been established on the basis of the ultimately retracted conclusions.

Oransky and Marcus claim that retractions also provide a window into the self-correcting nature of science, can provide insight into cases of scientific fraud, and can "be the source of great stories that say a lot about how science is conducted". In January 2021, more than 50 studies have cited Retraction Watch as the scientific publishing community is exploring the impact of retracted papers. During the COVID-19 pandemic, Retraction Watch maintained a separate list of retracted articles that added to misinformation about the pandemic, with additional research undertaken to analyse the subsequent pollution of further research as retracted papers are cited and used within scholarly research.

In 2023, in the wake of the resignation of Stanford University president Marc Tessier-Lavigne, Oransky and Marcus co-authored op-eds in Scientific American and The Guardian. They estimated that scientific misconduct was more common than is reported. They also assessed that, despite recent scandals involving research misconduct, the academic community was not interested in exposing wrongdoing and scientific errors. However, all members of the academic community are responsible for the delays and lack of action.

== Impact ==
Retraction Watch has demonstrated that retractions are more common than was previously thought. When Retraction Watch was launched, Marcus "wondered if we'd have enough material". It had been estimated that about 80 papers were retracted annually. However, in its first year, the blog reported on approximately 200 retractions. In October 2019 the Retraction Watch Database reached a milestone 20,000 entries As of January 2024, it contains over 50,000 entries.

== Hijacked journal tracker ==
In 2022, Retraction Watch added a feature that tracks journal hijacking. Political scientist Anna Abalkina had developed a method for identifying hijacked journal domains based on an analysis of the archives of clone journals. This method is based on the argument that fraudulent publishers recycle identical papers to create a fictitious archive for a hijacked journal. Methods used to locate or confirm hijacked statuses of journals include duplicated journal archives, identical website templates, growth in indexing, anomalous citations, and scholars’ comments. Abalkina created the Retraction Watch Hijacked Journal Checker in partnership with Retraction Watch.

== Administration ==
Retraction Watch has been funded by a variety of sources, including donations and grants. They received grants from the John D. and Catherine T. MacArthur Foundation, the Helmsley Charitable Trust, and the Laura and John Arnold Foundation. The database of retractions was funded by a $400,000 grant from the MacArthur Foundation in 2015. They have partnered with the Center for Open Science, which is also funded by the Laura and John Arnold Foundation, to create a retraction database on the Open Science Framework.

In 2023, Crossref and Retraction Watch began a collaboration in which Retraction Watch would provide its database and Crossref would process, open, analyze, and present the data.

== See also ==
- PubPeer
- Replication crisis
- Research Integrity Risk Index
- Center for Open Science
- Journal hijacking
- India Research Watch
