= William Meninger =

Trappist monk and spiritual teacher (1932–2021)

William Austin Meninger, O.C.S.O. (August 29, 1932 – February 14, 2021) was an American Trappist priest who was a spiritual teacher and a principal developer of centering prayer, a method of contemplative prayer.

== Early life ==
Meninger was born in Malden, Massachusetts. He was raised and educated in the Boston area in Massachusetts. His mother Katherine was born and raised in County Kerry, Ireland, and his father John was a Quaker from Pennsylvania.

After studying at St. John's Seminary in Boston, Meninger was ordained a priest in 1958 for the Diocese of Yakima in the State of Washington, where he worked on an Indian reservation and with Mexican migrant workers for six years. In 1963 he entered the Trappists at St. Joseph's Abbey in Spencer, Massachusetts, where he served in the guesthouse for 15 years, as well as teaching scripture, liturgy and patristics to the younger members of the abbey. He served as subprior, prior and dean of the junior professed monks, not yet in final vows.

== Centering Prayer ==
During this time, Meninger came across a work by an English hermit of the 14th century, called the Cloud of Unknowing. Meninger found that it taught contemplative prayer in a simple way available to anyone. He began to teach this method to the younger monks of the abbey and to the retreatants who had come to it for a period of spiritual reflection.

In 1974 Meninger developed the workshop on Contemplative Meditation (later known as Centering Prayer) which he taught worldwide along with workshops on forgiveness, the Enneagram of Personality, sacred scriptures, and prayer. His method was further developed and promoted by two other monks of his abbey, Thomas Keating (his abbot at the time) and Basil Pennington.

== Later life ==
In 1979, Meninger was transferred to a daughter house of Spencer Abbey, St. Benedict's Monastery in Snowmass, Colorado, where he has served as prior, vocation director, master of novices, and teacher of theology and scripture. He spent three years in Israel where he studied scripture and taught at the École Biblique in Jerusalem and at the Trappist Monastery of Latrun.

Meninger also did graduate studies at Seattle University, Harvard Divinity School, and Boston University.

He died at the Spence Abbey infirmary on February 14, 2021.
