= Interspirituality =

Embracing commonalities across spiritual traditions and practices

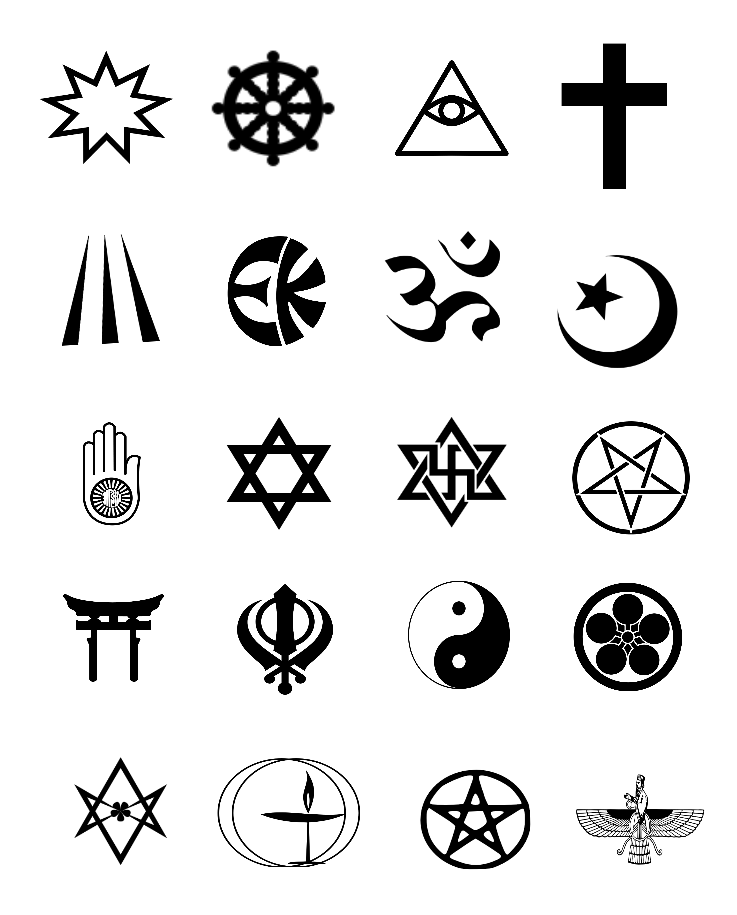
1st row: Baháʼí Faith, Buddhism, Cao Dai, Christianity 2nd row: Druidism, Eckankar, Hinduism, Islam 3rd row: Jainism, Judaism, Raëlism, Satanism 4th row: Shinto, Sikhism, Taoism, Tenrikyo 5th row: Thelema, Unitarian Universalism, Wicca, Zoroastrianism

Interspirituality, also known as interspiritual, is an interfaith concept where a diversity of spiritual practices are embraced for common respect for the individual and shared aspects across a variety of spiritual paths.

== History ==
Interspirituality originates in the work of Wayne Teasdale, who developed this term to reflect commonalities between religious traditions, specifically those that are spiritual in nature. These commonalities across religious practices do not erase differences in beliefs, rather they build community and sharing across practices, leading to the ultimate goal of more human responsibility to one another and the planet as a whole. At its core, this is an "assimilation of insights, values, and spiritual practices" drawn from many different traditions that can be applied to one's own life to further personal, spiritual development.

== Critique ==
While interspirituality is involved with common spiritual practices, these are not synonymous with how religious traditions practice. As such, interspirituality should not be considered synonymous with interfaith work, in part because some spiritual practices may be considered antithetic to certain religious practice, thereby including elements that would not be accepted by some conservative approaches. New insights that can be gained through aspects of other spiritual practices can be threatening to some faiths, as postmodern approaches to beliefs and practices can be challenging when individuals are encouraged to explore other practices to deepen one's own.

== Interspiritual meditation ==
One way interspirituality is practiced is through interspiritual meditation. This was originally developed by Edward Bastian from the Snowmass Conferences convened by Thomas Keating, who organized gatherings of people from other spiritual practices, including the Dalai Lama. Through these gatherings, interspiritual meditation grew to incorporate insights in meditative and contemplative practices across many spiritual traditions, primarily through engaging in shared spiritual practices and then discussing them, rather than through lectures or formal teachings about them. These practices continued to develop and expand beyond Keating's death.

== See also ==
- Spirituality
- Interfaith dialogue
- Thomas Keating
- Wayne Teasdale
