= St. Benedict's Monastery, Colorado =

Former Trappist monastery in Snowmass, Colorado

Coordinates: 39.2614412°N 107.0053632°W

St. Benedict's Monastery was a Roman Catholic Benedictine monastery in Pitkin County, Colorado, in the unincorporated community of Snowmass about 18 miles (29 km) northwest of Aspen. The monks were members of the Order of Cistercians of the Strict Observance, commonly called the Trappists.

The entire land belonging to the monastery, including the building of the monastery itself, was sold in December 2025 for US$120 million, to Palantir Technologies CEO Alex Karp.

== History ==
The ranch is about 3,700 acres (1,500 ha) in the foothills of the Elk Mountains, near the Maroon Bells-Snowmass Wilderness. The monastery protected a large amount of open space in a sensitive area near important wildlife migration routes. The monks managed their ranchlands, operated a cookie bakery, and offered retreat facilities for groups and individuals.

The monastery was founded in 1956 as a foundation established by the Trappist community at St. Joseph's Abbey in Spencer, Massachusetts. The community celebrated its 50th anniversary in 2006.

St. Benedict's was the home of Father Thomas Keating, a popular writer on centering prayer and one of the founders of Contemplative Outreach.

In April 2023, St. Benedict's signaled that it would close, and that Dom Damian Carr, former abbot of St. Joseph's Abbey, had been appointed as monastic commissary to oversee the closure process.
