= Wayne Teasdale =

American Catholic monk and author (1945–2004)

Wayne Robert Teasdale (16 January 1945 – 20 October 2004) was an American Catholic monk, author, and teacher from Connecticut. He was an energetic proponent of mutual understanding between the world's religions, for an interfaith dialogue which he termed "interspirituality". He was also an active campaigner on issues of social justice.

Teasdale was inspired by Bede Griffiths and was particularly focussed on looking at Christianity and Hinduism in the way of Christian sannyasa.

== Career ==
Teasdale spent 10 years as a Trappist monk at St. Joseph’s Abbey in Massachusetts, under the direction of Abott Thomas Keating, founder of the centering prayer movement; he then travelled to India to study at Bede Griffiths's Benedictine ashram.

Teasdale served on the board of trustees of the Parliament of the World's Religions; he was also a member of the Monastic Interreligious Dialogue and helped draft their Universal Declaration on Nonviolence. He was an adjunct professor at DePaul University, Columbia College, and the Catholic Theological Union, Chicago, and he also co-ordinated the Bede Griffiths International Trust. He held an M.A. in philosophy from St. Joseph College and a Ph.D. in theology from Fordham University.

== Publications ==
=== Books ===
- Essays in Mysticism: Explorations into Contemplative Experience, Foreword by George A. Maloney (Liturgical Publications/Sunday Publications 1982) ISBN 0-941850-02-1
- Towards a Christian Vedanta: The Encounter of Hinduism and Christianity according to Bede Griffiths (Asian Trading Corporation 1987) ISBN 81-7086-122-5 Developed from his dissertation at Fordham University.
- The Mystic Heart: Discovering a Universal Spirituality in the World’s Religions, Foreword by the Dalai Lama, Preface by Beatrice Bruleau (New World Library 1999) ISBN 1-57731-140-X
- A Monk in the World: Cultivating a Spiritual Life, Foreword by Ken Wilber (New World Library 2002) ISBN 1-57731-437-9
- Bede Griffiths: An Introduction to his Interspiritual Thought, Foreword by Bede Griffiths (Skylight Paths Publishing 2003) ISBN 1-893361-77-2
- Catholicism in Dialogue: Conversations across the Traditions (Rowman & Littlefield Publishers 2004) ISBN 0-7425-3177-5
- The Mystic Hours: A Daybook of Inspirational Wisdom and Devotion (New World Library 2004) ISBN 1-57731-472-7

=== Editor ===
- The Community of Religions: Voices and Images of the Parliament of the World's Religions, editor, with George Cairns (Continuum International Publishing Group 1996) ISBN 0-8264-0899-0
- Awakening the Spirit, Inspiring the Soul: 30 Stories of Interspiritual Discovery in the Community of Faiths, editor, with Martha Howard, Foreword by Joan Borysenko (Skylight Paths Publishing 2004) ISBN 1-59473-039-3
