= Centering prayer =

Form of contemplative prayer

Centering Prayer is a method of Christian prayer developed in the 20th century by Trappist monks at St. Joseph's Abbey in Spencer, Massachusetts: Fr. William Meninger, Fr. Basil Pennington and Fr. Thomas Keating, developed from the historical practice of contemplative prayer.

Centering prayer is influenced by ancient Christian practices outlined in texts by St. Teresa Avila, St. John of the Cross and the text The Cloud of Unknowing as well as many other ancient Christian writings. It is not meant to replace other kinds of prayer; rather it aims to cast a new light and depth of meaning on them by fostering a direct experience of God. Centering Prayer is not without controversy among some Catholics, by arguing the practice is inappropriate and deviates from mainstream views of prayer.

== Name ==
The name was taken from Thomas Merton's description of contemplative prayer, from which Centering Prayer draws, as prayer that is "centered entirely on the presence of God". (Note: The Center for Christian Spirituality, Thomas Merton & Centering Prayer) In his book Contemplative Prayer, Merton writes "Monastic prayer begins not so much with 'considerations' as with a 'return to the heart,' finding one's deepest center, awakening the profound depths of our being in the presence of God".

== Origins ==
The 20th-century Trappist monk and writer Thomas Merton renewed Christian interest in contemplative practices. In addition to traditional Trappist practices, late in his life he was influenced by Buddhist meditation, particularly as found in Zen. He became a friend of Buddhist Thich Nhat Hanh, praised Chogyam Trungpa who founded Shambhala Buddhism in the United States and was also an acquaintance of the current Dalai Lama. His theology attempted to unify the tenets of the Roman Catholic faith with other philosophical trends including existentialism In this context, he was an advocate of the non-discursive style of contemplative prayer, which he saw as a direct confrontation of finite and irrational man with his ground of being.

Cistercian monk Thomas Keating, a founder of Centering Prayer, was abbot all through the 1960s and 1970s at St. Joseph's Abbey in Spencer, Massachusetts. This region has multiple religious institutions including a Theravada Buddhist centre, Insight Meditation Society. Keating was asked to renew the Contemplative Dimension of the Gospel and helped develop Centering Prayer to introduce Christian contemplative practices to younger people who were fleeing to Eastern spiritual traditions.

Early Christian sources sometimes used the Ancient Greek term θεωρία theoria to describe what is now known as contemplation. Modern advocates of centering prayer also cite influence form Desert Fathers of early Christian monasticism, the Lectio Divina tradition of Benedictine monasticism, and to works like The Cloud of Unknowing and the writings of St. Teresa of Avila and St. John of the Cross. The earliest Christian writings that clearly speak of contemplative prayer come from the 4th-century monk St. John Cassian, who wrote of a practice he learned from the Desert Fathers (specifically from Isaac). Cassian's writings remained influential until the medieval era when monastic practice shifted from a mystical orientation to Scholasticism. During the 16th century, Carmelite saints Teresa of Avila and John of the Cross wrote and taught about the stages of Contemplative prayer. Christian prayer

== Practice ==
In Centering Prayer, the participant rests in the presence of God directly and surrenders discursive thoughts and imagined scenes. The participant's aim is to be present to the Lord, to "consent to God's presence and action during the time of prayer." Fr. M. Basil Pennington describes four steps for practicing Centering Prayer:

1. Sit comfortably with your eyes closed, relax, and quiet yourself. Be in love and faith to God.
2. Choose a sacred word that best supports your sincere intention to be in the Lord's presence and open to His divine action within you.
3. Let that word be gently present as your symbol of your sincere intention to be in the Lord's presence and open to His divine action within you.
4. Whenever you become aware of thoughts, feelings, perceptions, images, associations, etc., simply return to your sacred word, (as a symbol of your intention to consent to God's presence and action.)

In addition, Keating writes, "The method consists in letting go of every kind of thought during prayer, even the most devout thoughts". The "sacred word" can be God, Jesus, Abba, Father, Love, Peace, or a similar word. Rather than being a tool to quiet the mind, it is a consent to the presence and action of God within and "just be" with God, helping people to be more present and open to God. Advocates of Centering Prayer also say it does not replace other prayer but encourages silence and deeper connection to God.

Centering Prayer advocates link the practice to traditional forms of Christian meditation, such as on the Rosary, or Lectio Divina, and Keating has promoted both Lectio Divina and Centering Prayer.

== Reception ==
Pope Francis did not comment on Centering Prayer directly, but spoke very highly of Thomas Merton, who described contemplative prayer as prayer "centered entirely on the presence of God." Pope Francis listed Merton as one of four great Americans in a speech before the U.S. Congress in September 2015 and encouraged sowing dialogue and peace in his contemplative style.

In 1989, the Congregation for the Doctrine of the Faith, led by Cardinal Joseph Ratzinger (later Pope Benedict XVI) issued Letter to the Bishops of the Catholic Church on Some Aspects of Christian Meditation. The letter addresses perceived problems in some modern prayer methods, many of which have been influenced by Eastern religions and the New Age movement. Keating said that this letter does not directly apply to Centering Prayer, and states that "the gift of contemplative prayer can only be granted through the Holy Spirit." Connie Rossini and Dan Burke, however, argued there are similarities between the teaching of Keating and his colleagues and specific criticisms made by the CDF, while Dan DeCelles considers Centering Prayer to fall afoul of the caution against similar prayer forms in this letter.

In 2003, the Pontifical Council for Interreligious Dialogue and the Pontifical Council for Culture published Jesus Christ, the Bearer of the Water of Life: a Christian Reflection on the "New Age". Susan Brinkmann writes that her concerns were addressed in this document. Centering Prayer practitioners respond that Bearer of the Water of Life does not have doctrinal authority, and neither Vatican document mentions Centering Prayer, contemplative outreach, or Keating by name.

According to Rossini, Centering Prayer is contradicted by the teachings of Teresa of Ávila. She further states that Centering Prayer is in contradiction to Lectio Divina, arguing that traditional prayers such as the Holy Rosary and Lectio Divina engage the heart and mind with Sacred Scripture, while Centering Prayer is "devoid of content".

John D. Dreher argues that Centering Prayer is a distortion of the teachings of the Desert Fathers and The Cloud of Unknowing.

== Research ==
Research has been conducted on the Centering Prayer program, indicating that it may be helpful for women receiving chemotherapy, and that it may help congregants experience a more collaborative relationship with God, as well as reduced stress.

Andrew B. Newberg explained one study that examined the brains of nuns who engaged in Centering Prayer, which is meant to create a feeling of oneness with God. The nuns' brain scans showed similarities to people who use drugs like psilocybin mushrooms, Newberg said, and both experiences "tend to result in very permanent changes in the way in which the brain works."

== See also ==
- Christian contemplation
- Hesychasm
- Hesychia

== Sources ==
Printed sources

- Johnston, William (2004). The Inner Eye of Love: Mysticism and Religion. Harper Collins. p. 24. ISBN 978-0-8232-1777-9.
- Keating, Fr. Thomas (2006). Open Mind, Open Heart, 20th Anniversary Edition. London: Bloomsbury. p. 21.
- Keating, Thomas (2009). Intimacy with God: an Introduction to Centering Prayer.
- Merton, Thomas (2009). Contemplative Prayer (First paperback ed.). New York: Crown Publishing Group. pp. 5–6. ISBN 978-0-307-58953-8.
- Pennington, Fr. M. Basil (1986). "Centering prayer: Refining the Rules". Review for Religious. 45 (3): 386–393.
- Rossini, Connie (2015c). Is Centering Prayer Catholic? Fr. Thomas Keating Meets Teresa of Avil and the CDF. New Ulm, Minnesota: Four Waters Press. ISBN 978-0692518489.

Web-sources
