= Monastery of the Holy Spirit =

Trappist monastery in Conyers, Georgia

Coordinates: 33.586452°N 84.065999°W

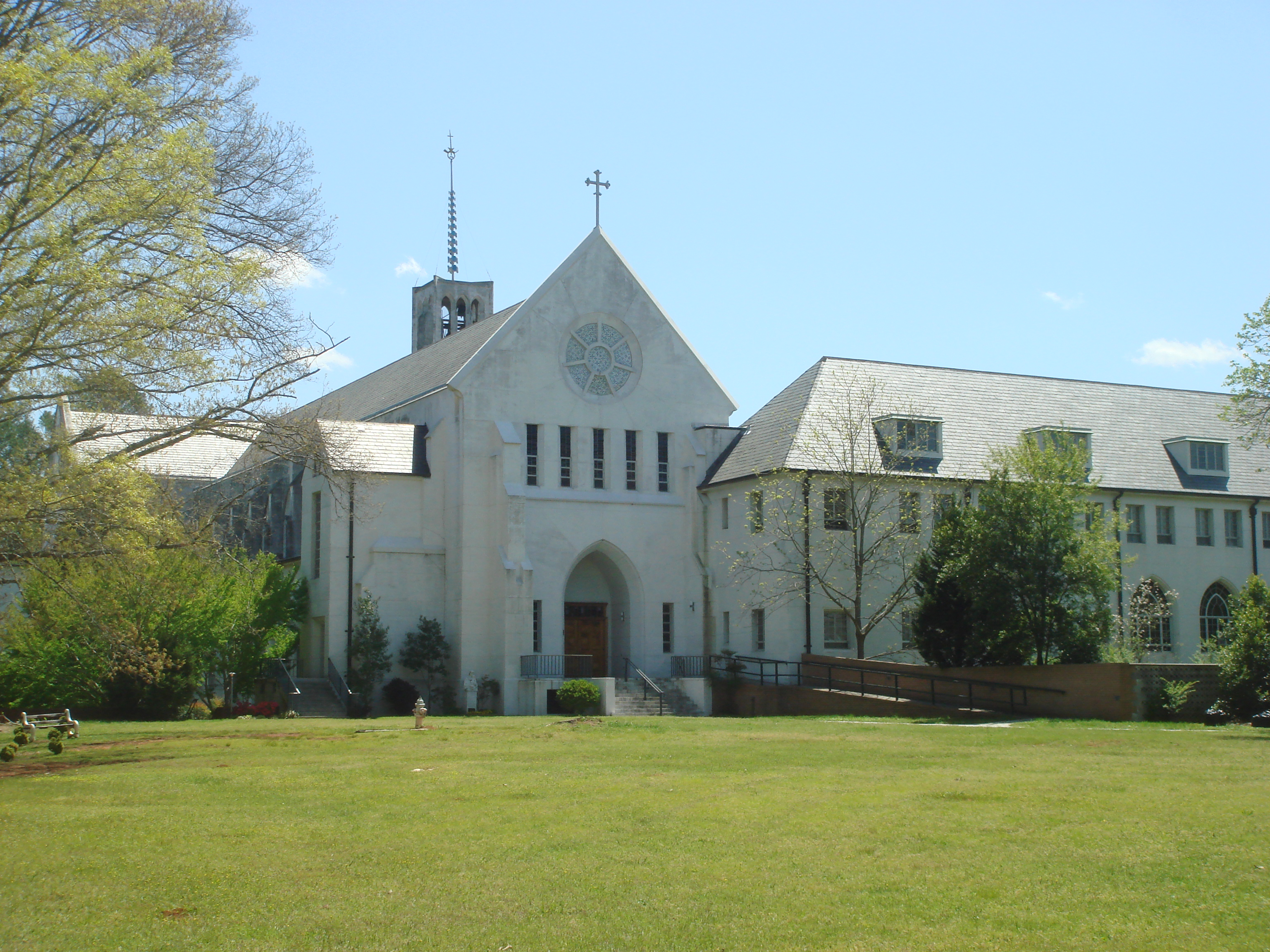
Monastery of the Holy Spirit

The Monastery of the Holy Spirit, officially the Monastery of Our Lady of the Holy Spirit, is a Trappist monastery located near Conyers, Georgia. It is part of the Catholic Church. As of 2024, the monastery is home to a community of 22 monks who are self-sustaining, running businesses on site. The monastery and grounds are a part of the Arabia Mountain National Heritage Area and also serve as the southernmost point on the Arabia Mountain Path.

== History ==
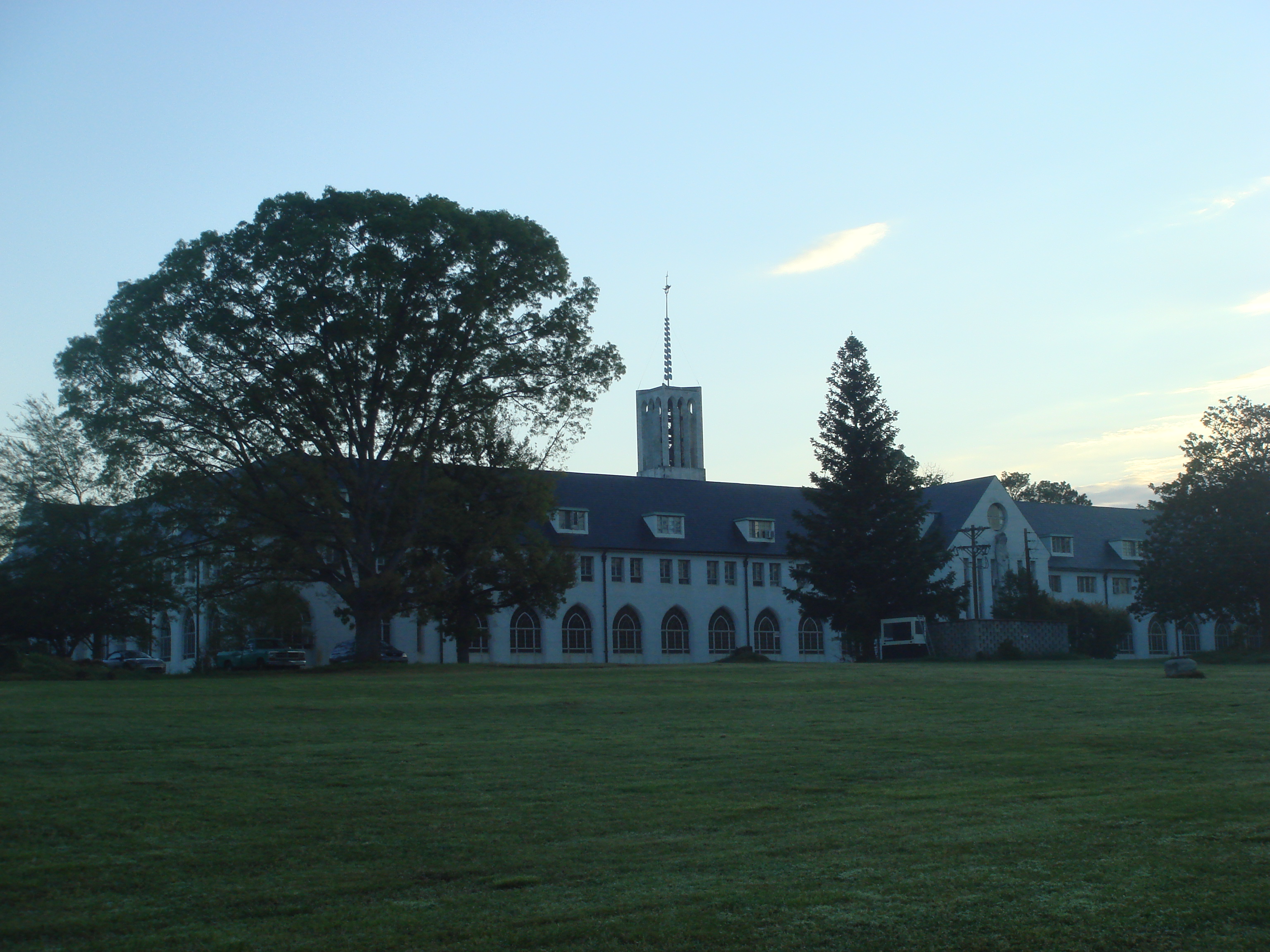
The monastery at daybreak

The Monastery of the Holy Spirit was founded on March 21, 1944, by 20 monks from the Abbey of Gethsemani in Kentucky. The Archdiocese of Atlanta and silent film star Colleen Moore donated 1,400 acres (5.7 km^{2}) of land, and the first monks lived in a barn while they built (by themselves) what would become known as the "pine board" monastery. They lived in this monastery from 1944 to 1959 while they built the present monastery, a concrete structure complete with a retreat house and cloister. In 2005, the pine board monastery which housed their carpentry and stained glass businesses was destroyed in a fire.

The present abbot is Augustine Myslinski who received the abbatial blessing of the solemnity of the Assumption of the Blessed Virgin Mary on August 15, 2016. He was re-elected in 2022. Previous abbots have been Augustine Moore, Armand Veilleux, Bernard Johnson, Basil Pennington, and Francis Michael Stiteler.

== Prayer, confession and spiritual direction ==
The primary work of the monks at the Monastery of the Holy Spirit is prayer. The monks begin their day of prayer at 4am with vigils and a half hour of contemplation. They break at about 5:30am and return at 7am for Mass. Throughout their day of work in their businesses and chores, the monks break for prayer at midmorning, midday (12:15pm), evening (vespers at 5:20pm) and compline (night prayer) at 7:30pm. Grand silence for both monks and guests is required after 8pm. Retreat house guests are encouraged to pray with the monks in the church.

At least half of the monks at the Monastery of the Holy Spirit are priests who rotate in administering the Sacrament of Penance (Confession) at the retreat house. Monks are also available for spiritual direction and welcome people of all faiths, including those of no faith.

== Retreats ==
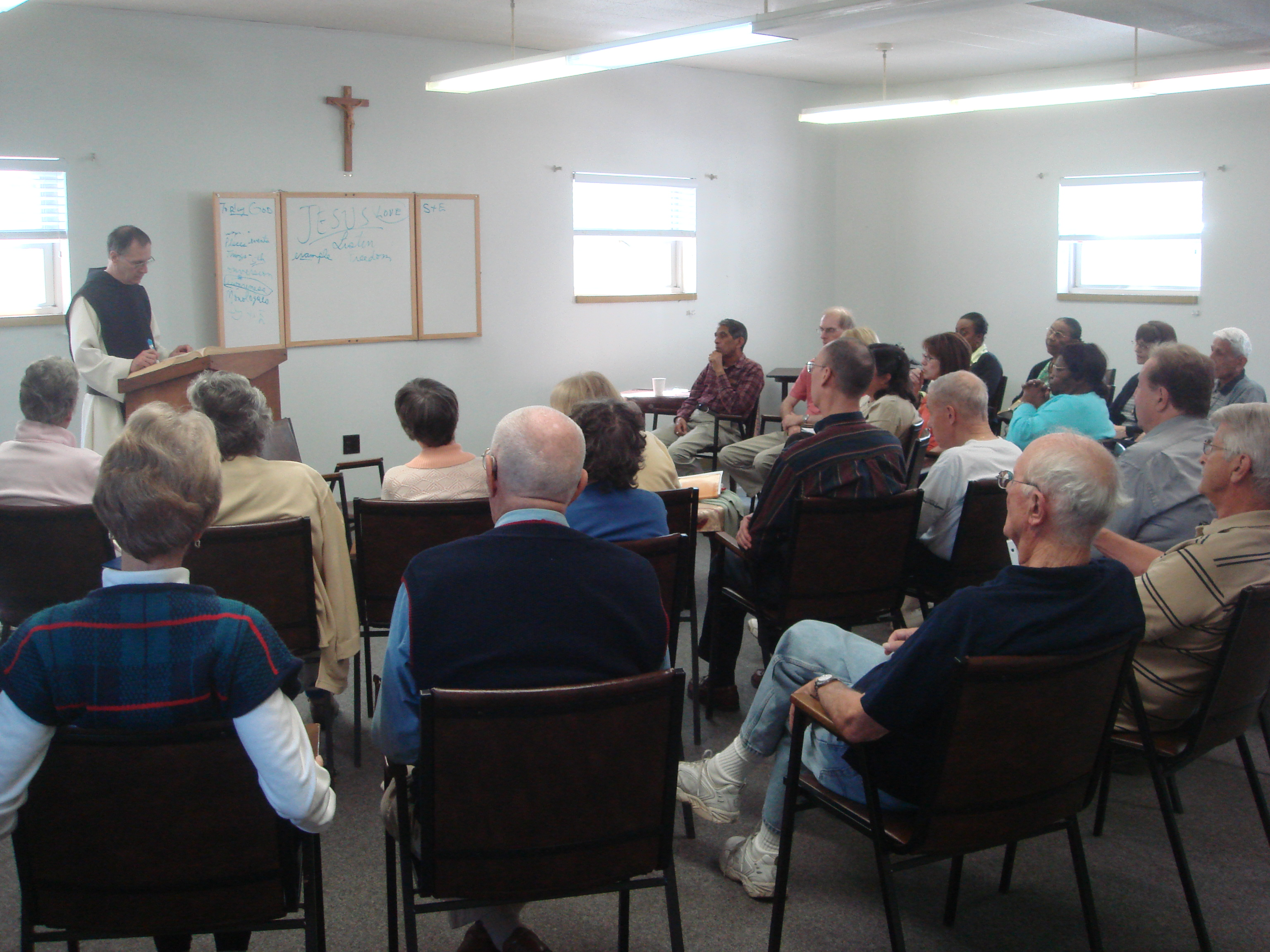
Retreats are offered year round on a range of spiritual topics offered by the monks.

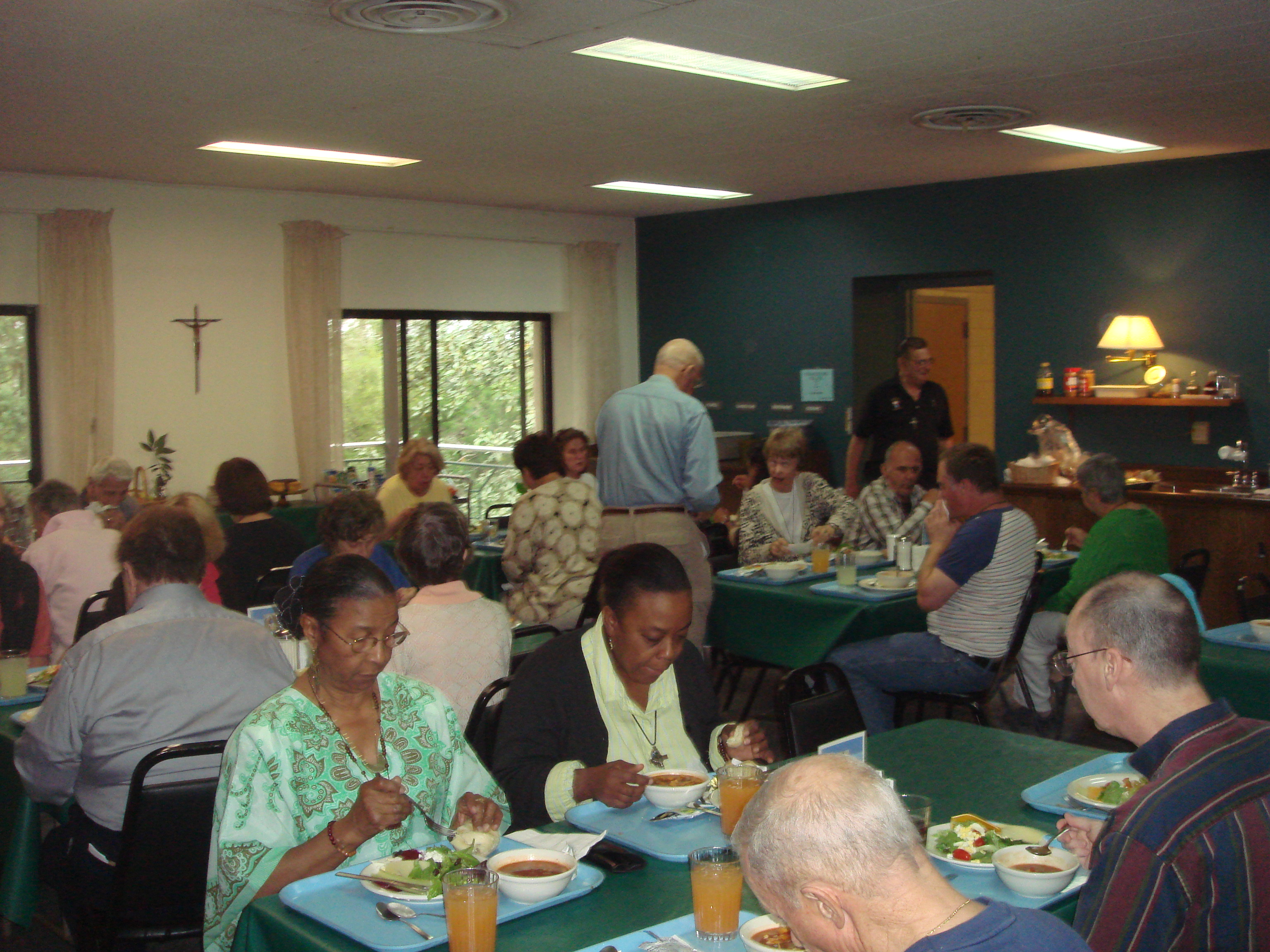
A meal in the refectory of the Retreat House silent dining room

The monks operate a self-sustaining retreat for people who wish to seek a religious retreat. On the premises and adjoining the church is their dormitory-style retreat house where separate floors for men and women accommodate individual and groups of guests for retreats scheduled almost year-round. Classes and retreats are offered on religious topics.

== Lay associates ==
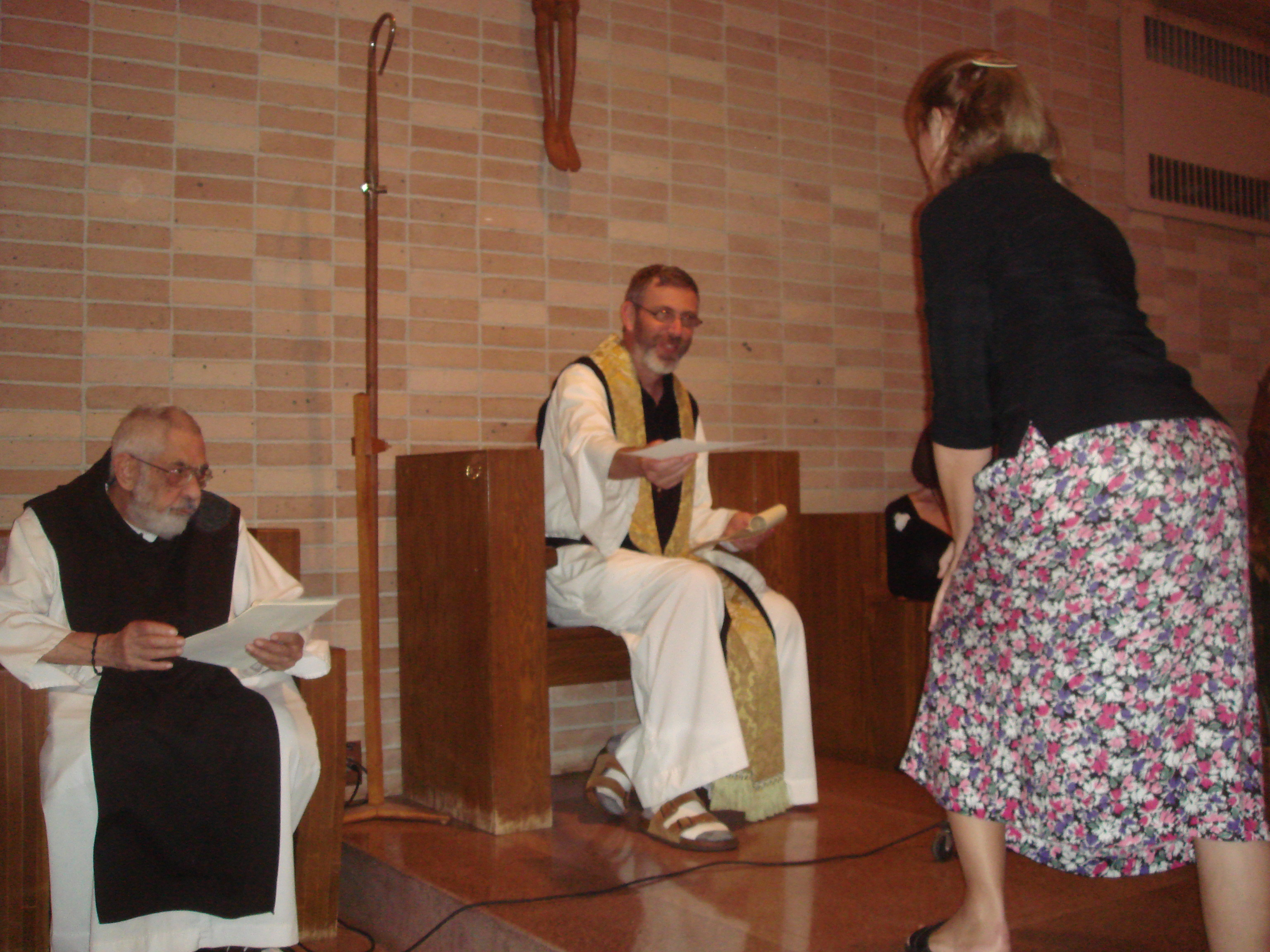
Abbot Francis Michael Stiteler and Prior Anthony Delisi meeting with an affiliated Lay Cisterican group

The Lay Associate movement began with a small group of people associated with the Monastery of the Holy Spirit and led by Fr. Anthony Delisi, former abbot and current prior. These groups are composed of lay people who form a prayerful community that forms its members in Cistercian spiritualty. These groups make annual retreats to the monastery. The Monastery of the Holy Spirit is now motherhouse to five different groups of Lay Cistercians. There are Lay Cistercians worldwide who are affiliated with monasteries near their groups.

== Monastery businesses ==
The monks of Holy Spirit follow the Rule of St. Benedict, in particular the precept of self-sustainment by operating several businesses. These include stained glass production and sales through an online store. They also operate a green cemetery located on the monastery property. The monks produce fruitcakes and fudge.

== Visitor center ==
In 2011 a public gathering place and visitor center was built in the barn where the monks first lived when they began the monastery. The center features a museum that showcases the history and work of the monastery.

== Gallery ==
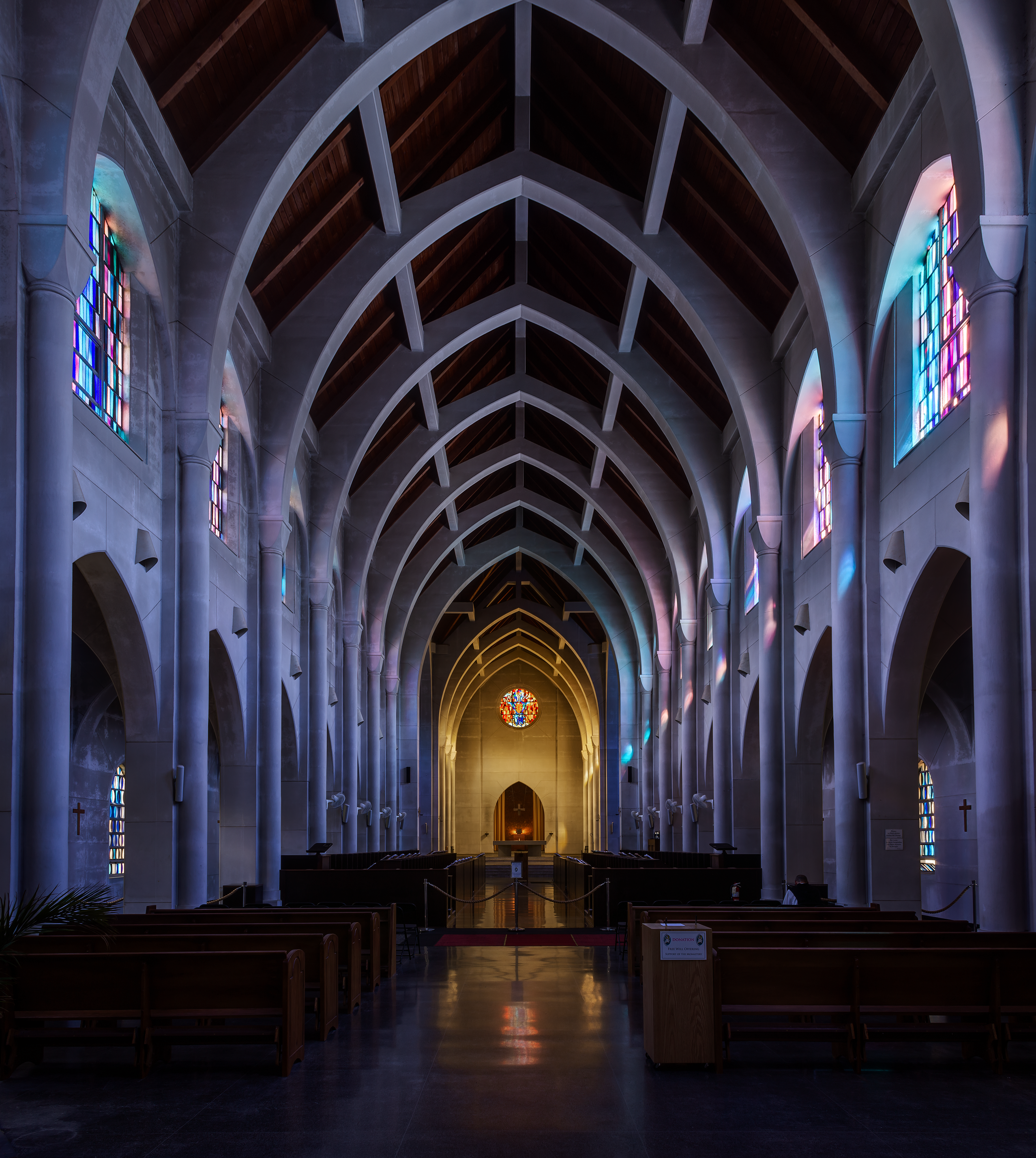
Interior view of the church

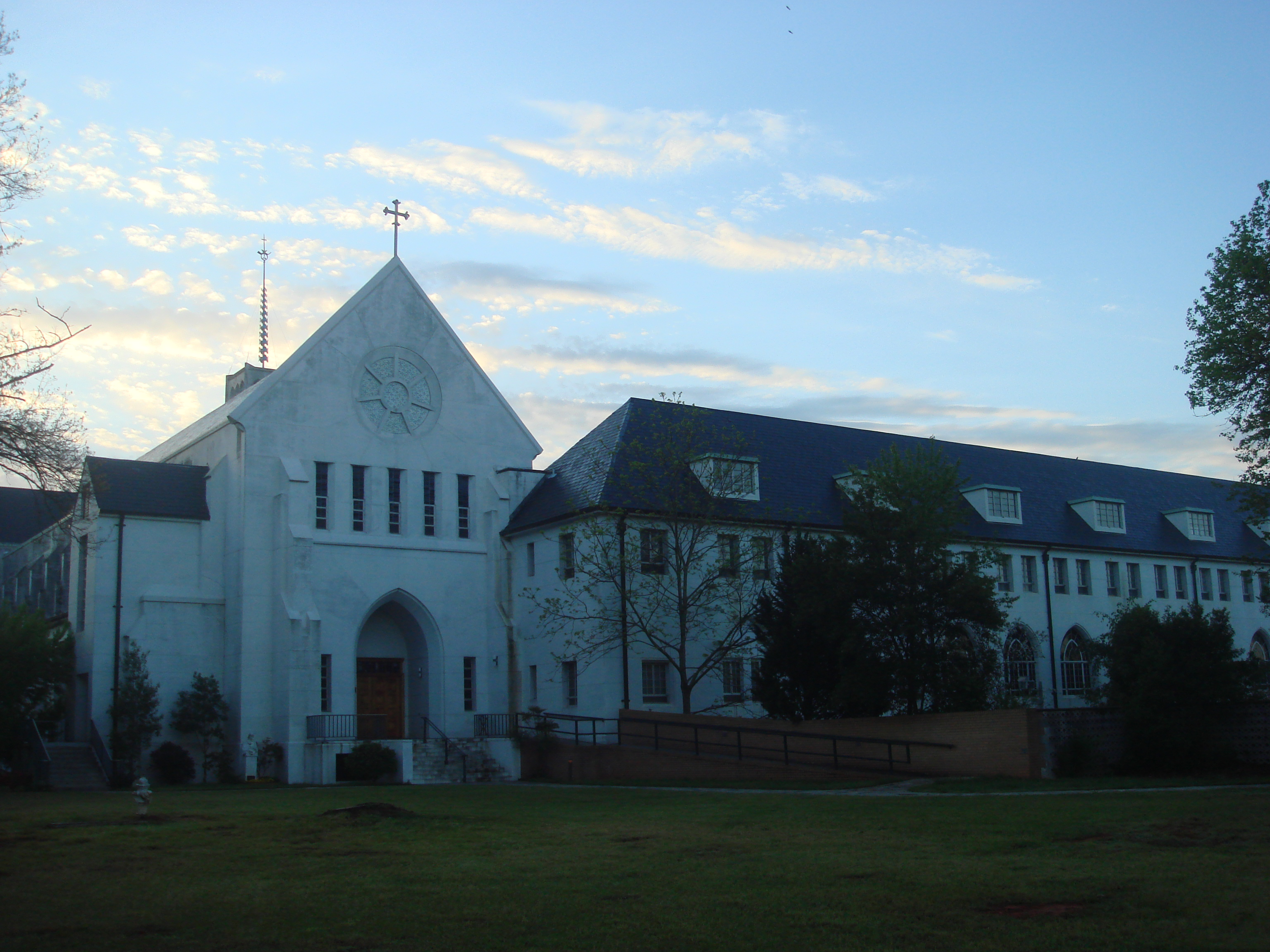
Church facade at daybreak

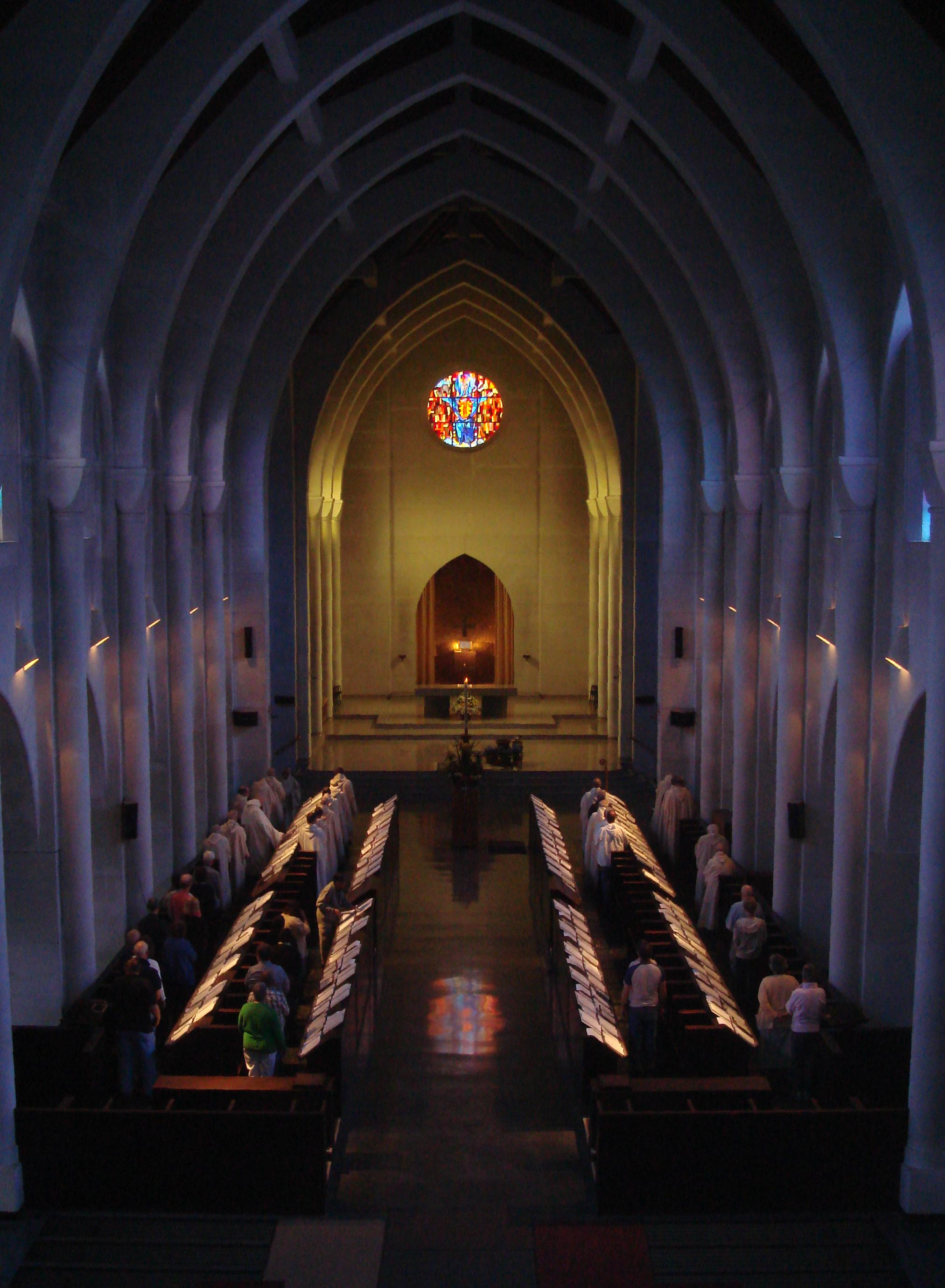
Holy Spirit Monastery monks at prayer in the main church

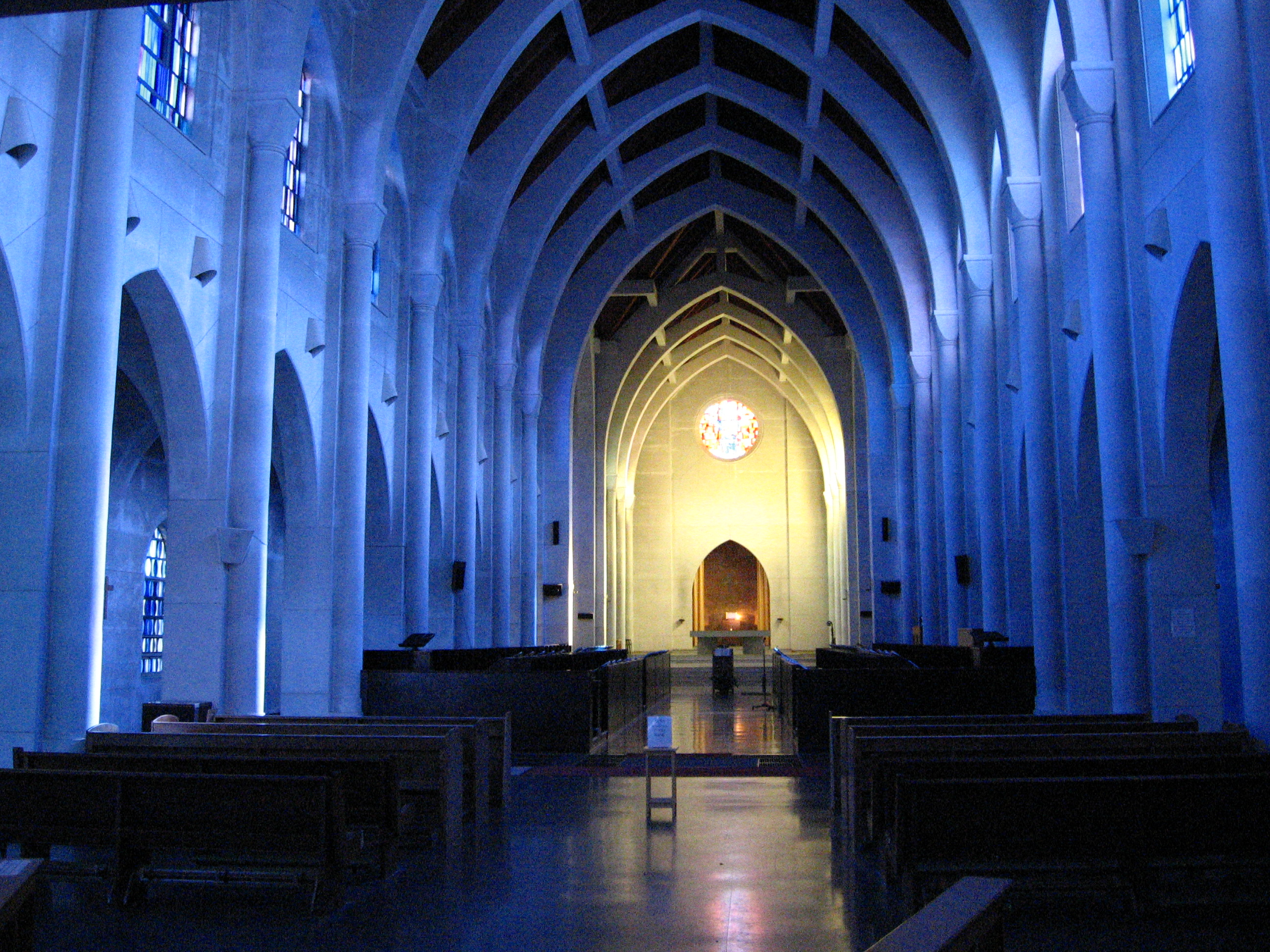
The interior of the church

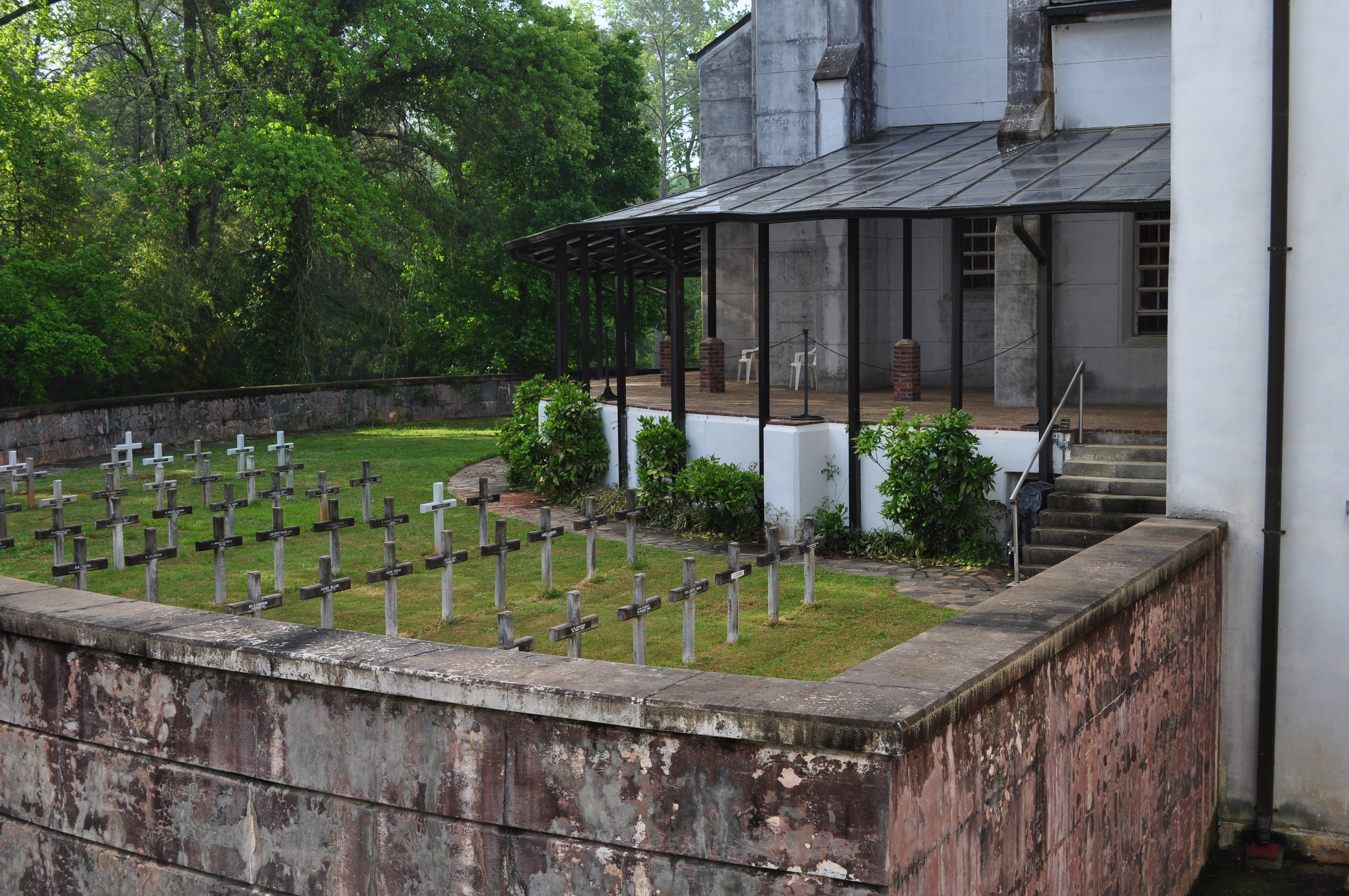
Monks graveyard behind the church

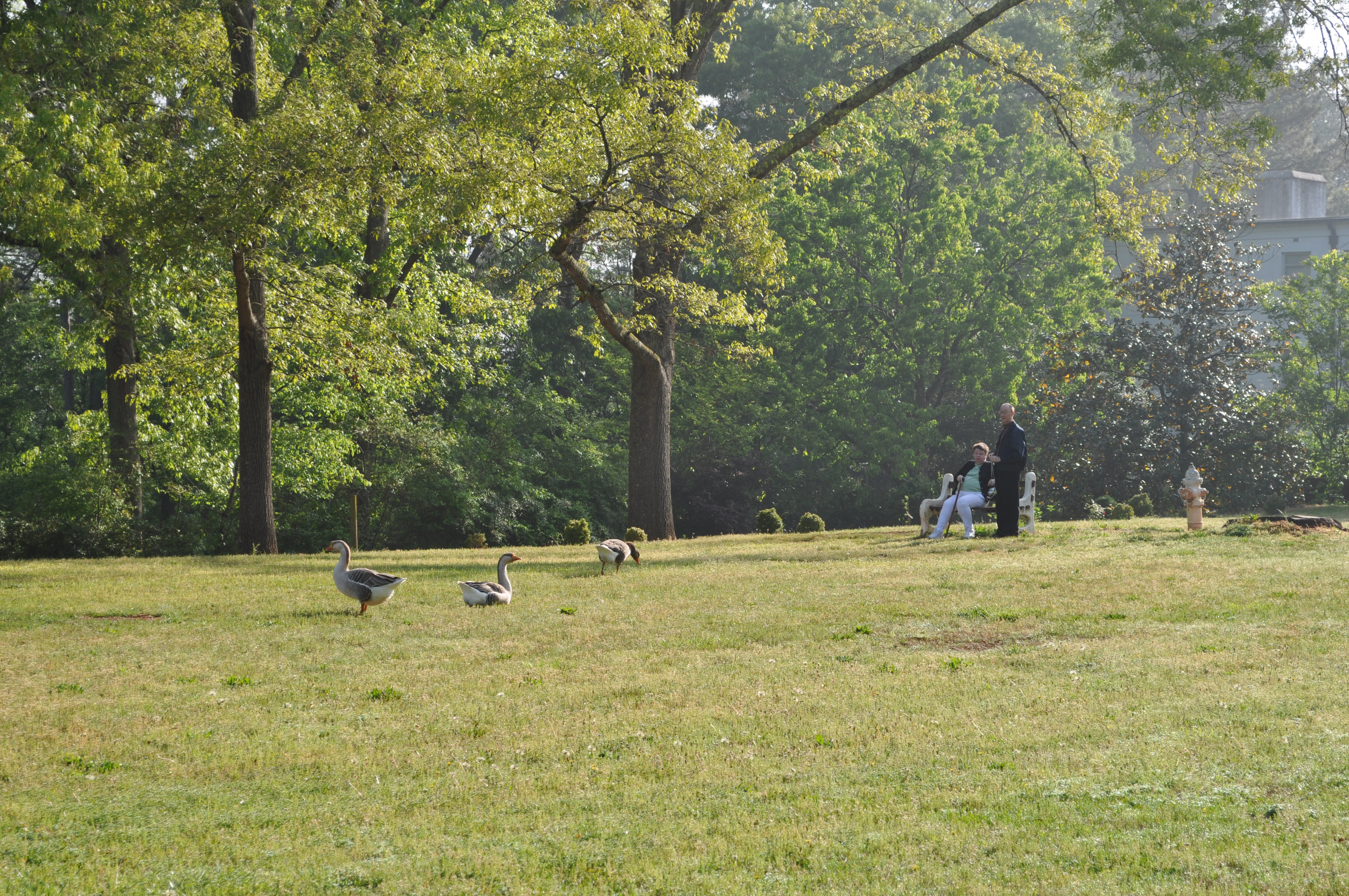
Front lawn

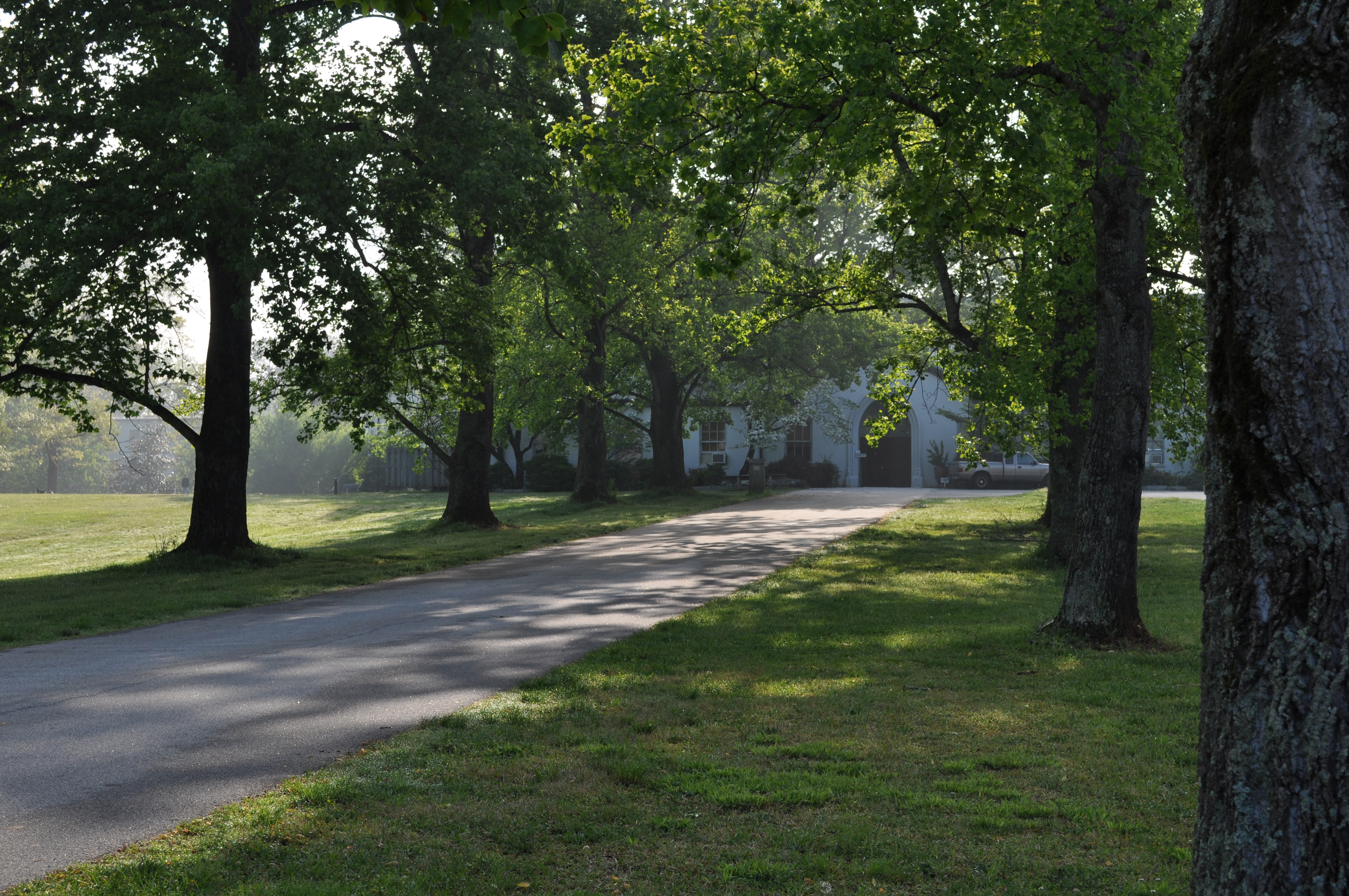
Road to the welcome center

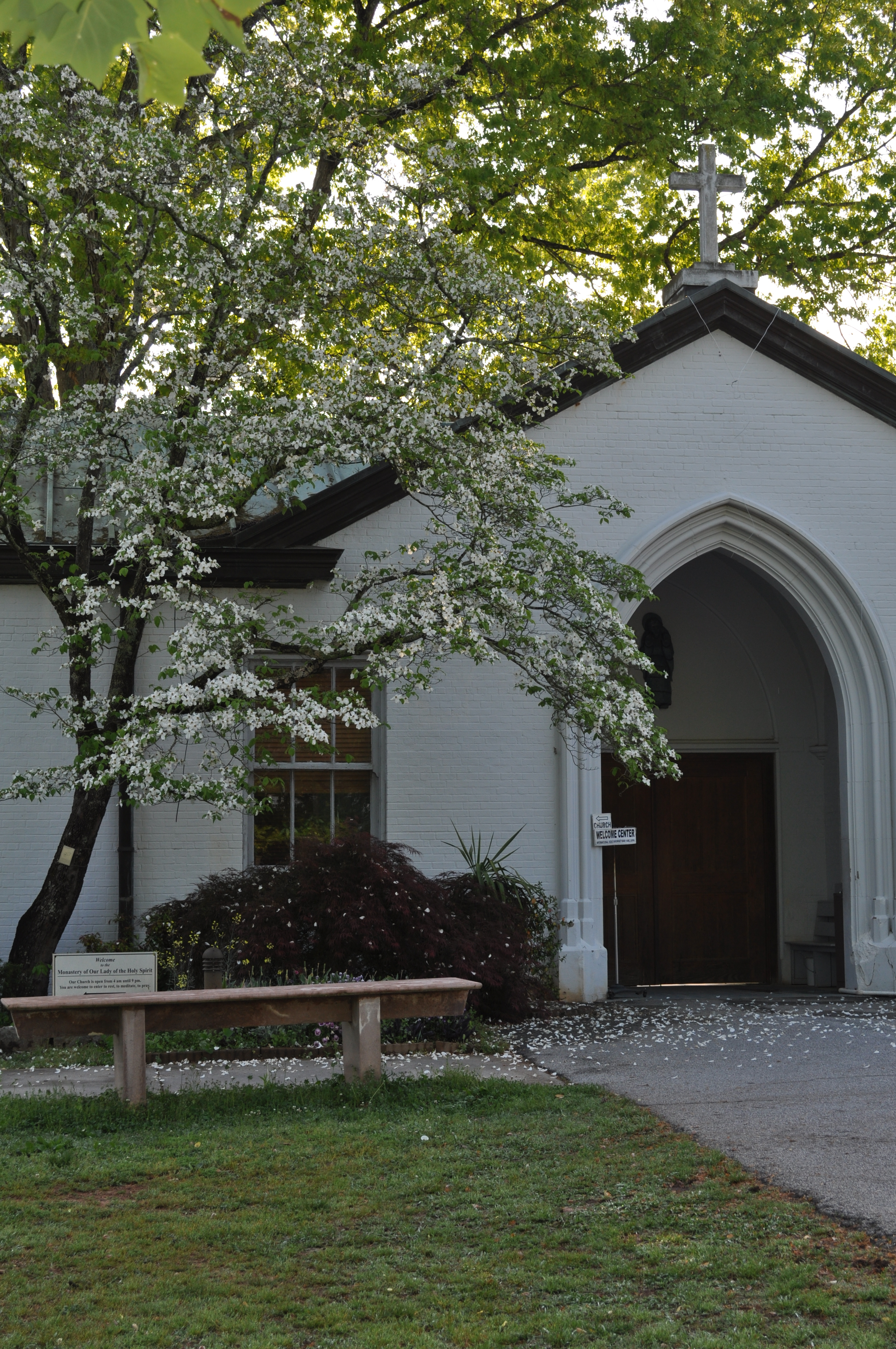
Welcome center and museum

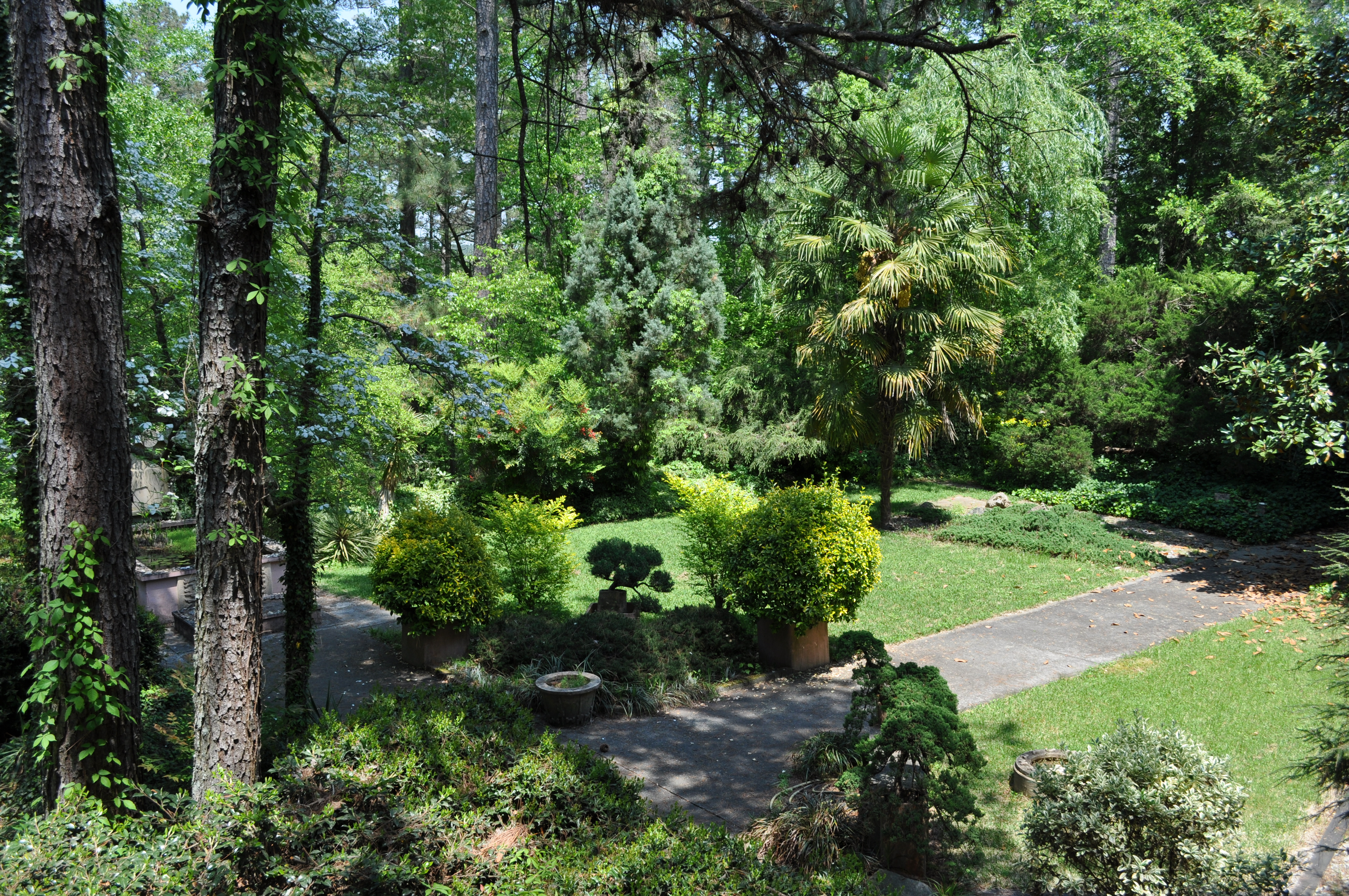
Retreat House gardens

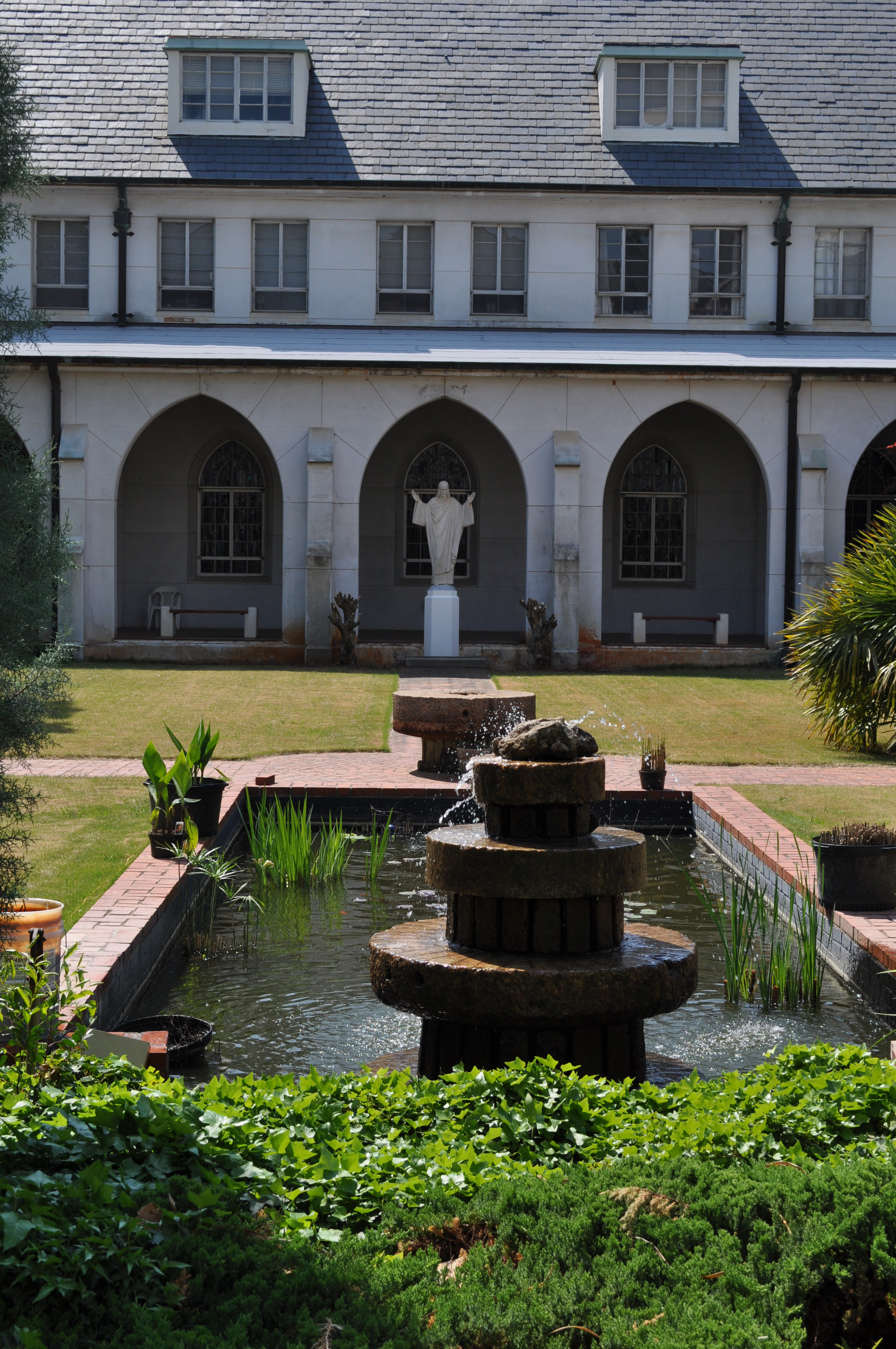
Statue of Jesus in the cloister garden

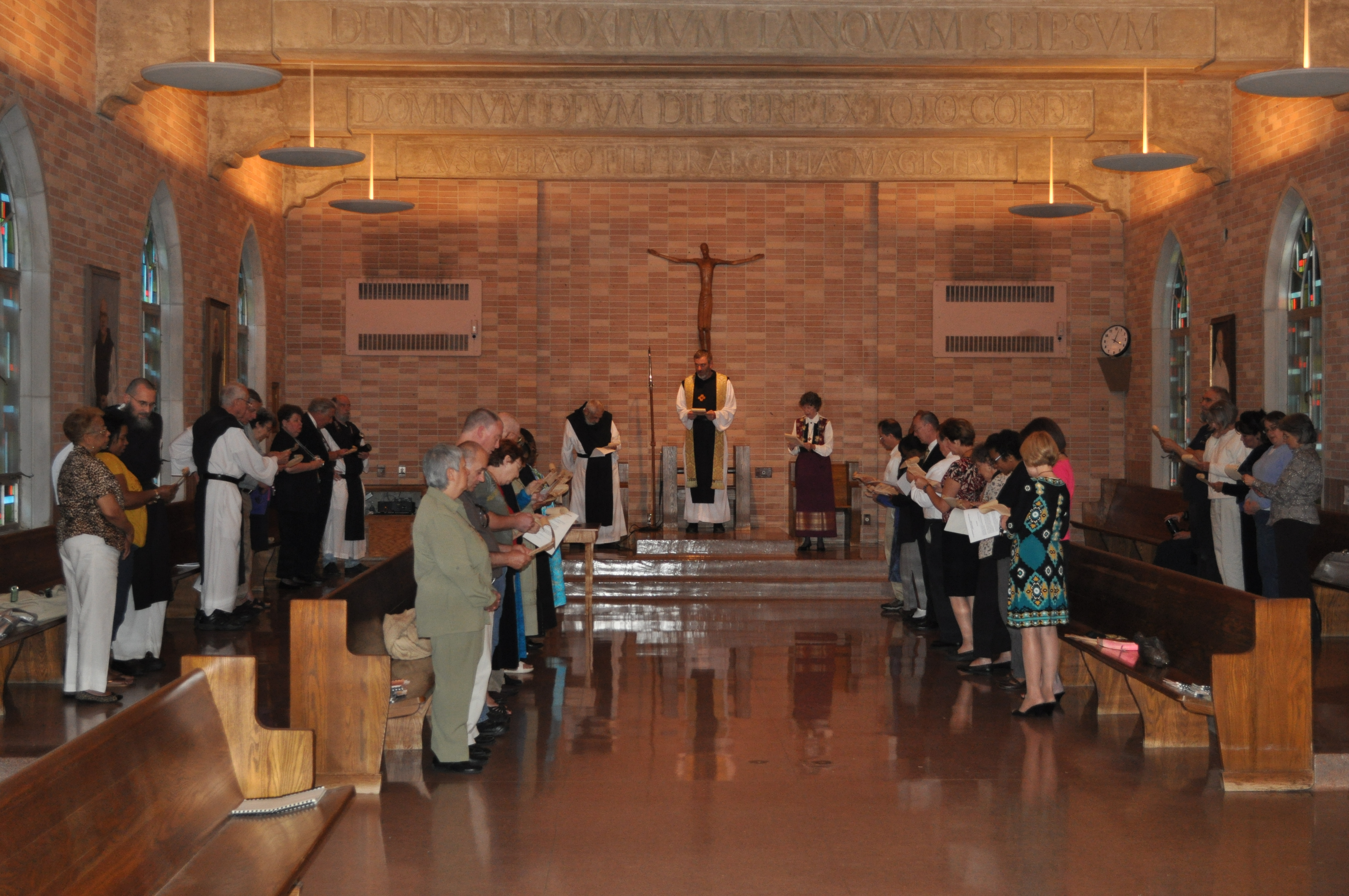
The Chapter Room. Usually the monks meet together in this room for daily religious instruction and meditation but this photo shows a ceremony with the abbot and guests.

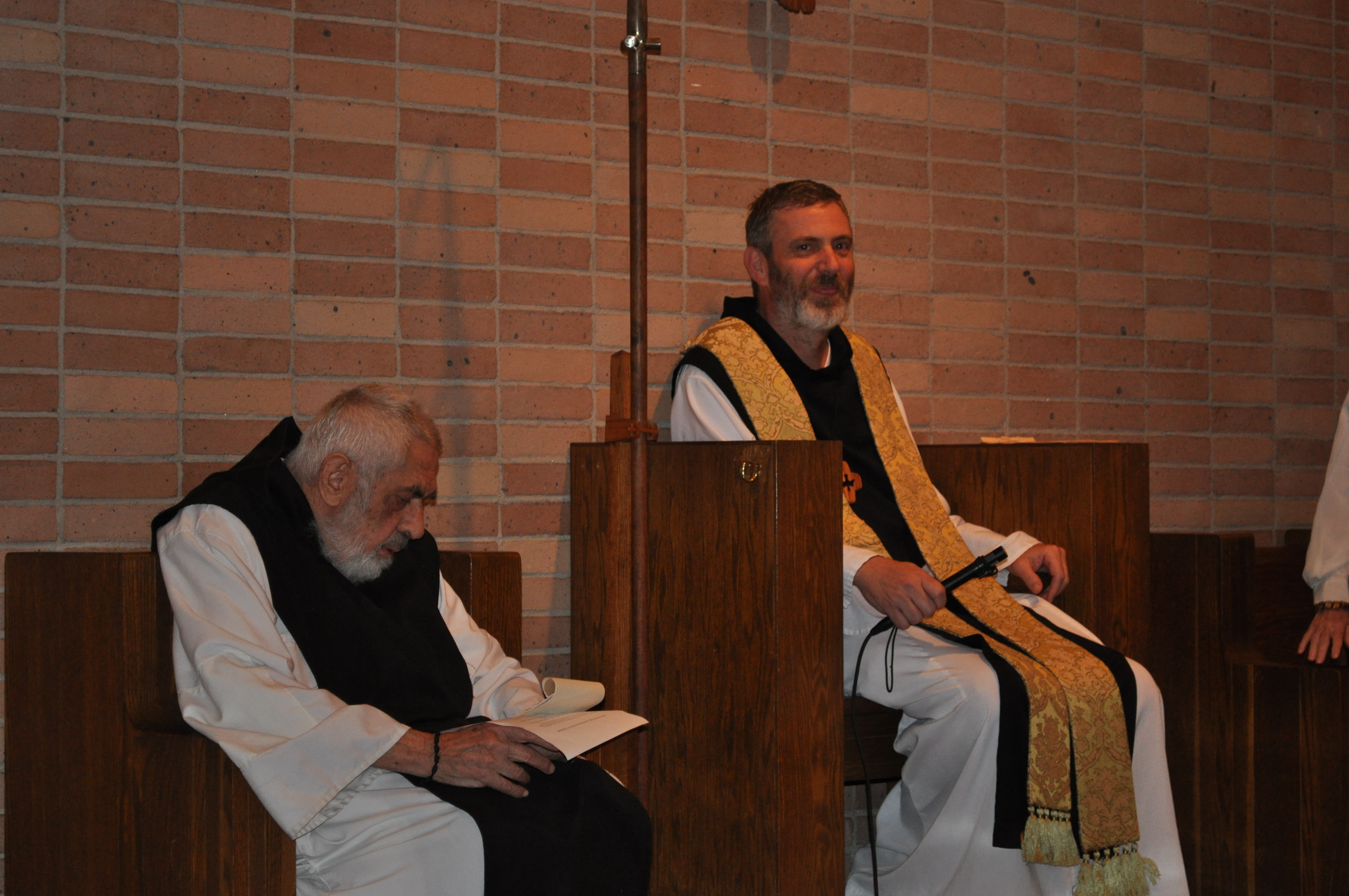
Abbot Francis Michael and Prior Anthony Delisi (on the left)

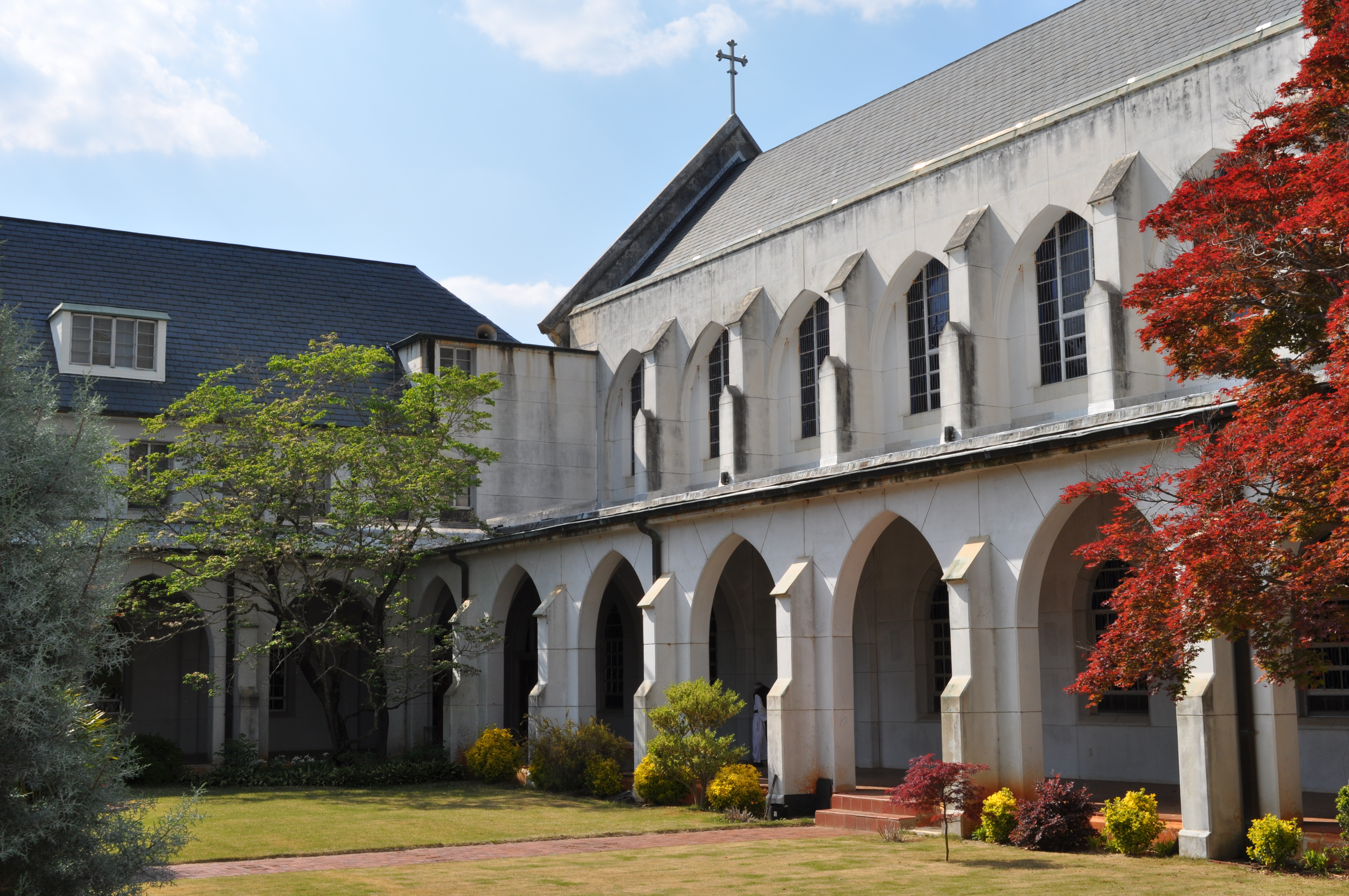
A view of the church from the cloister garden

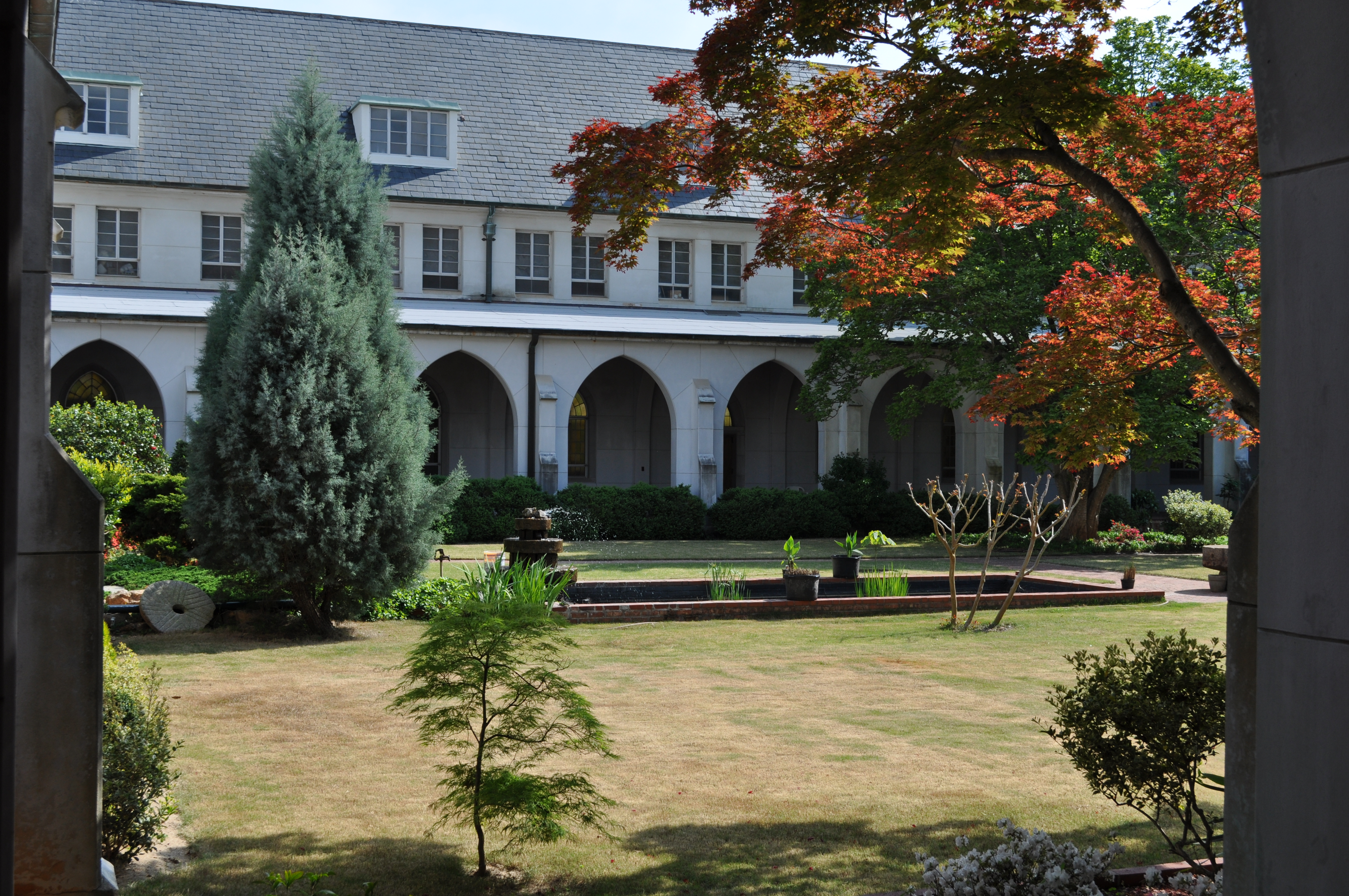
Cloister garden

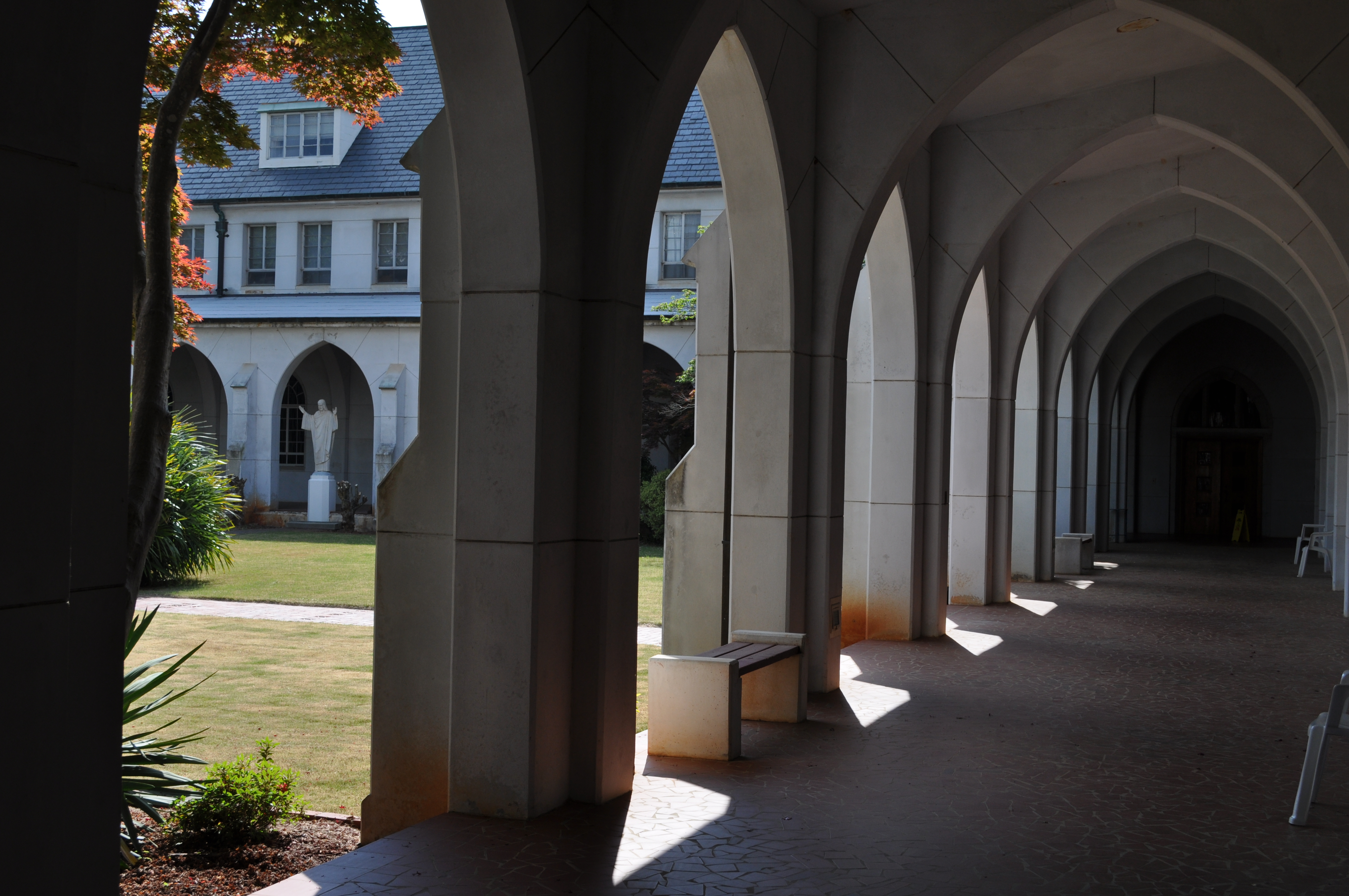
The statue of Jesus in the cloister garden viewed from the walkway near the church

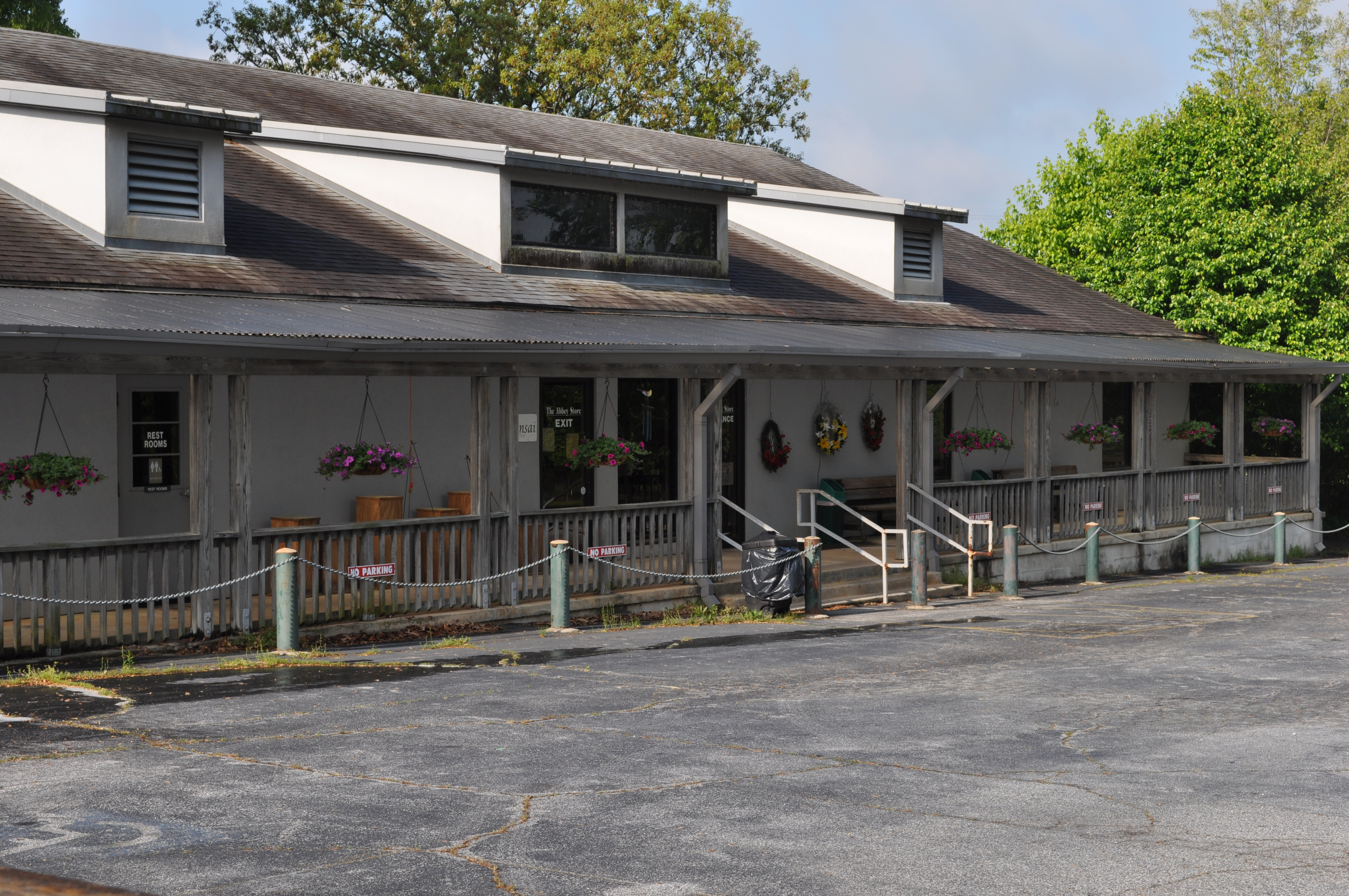
Exterior view of the gift shop

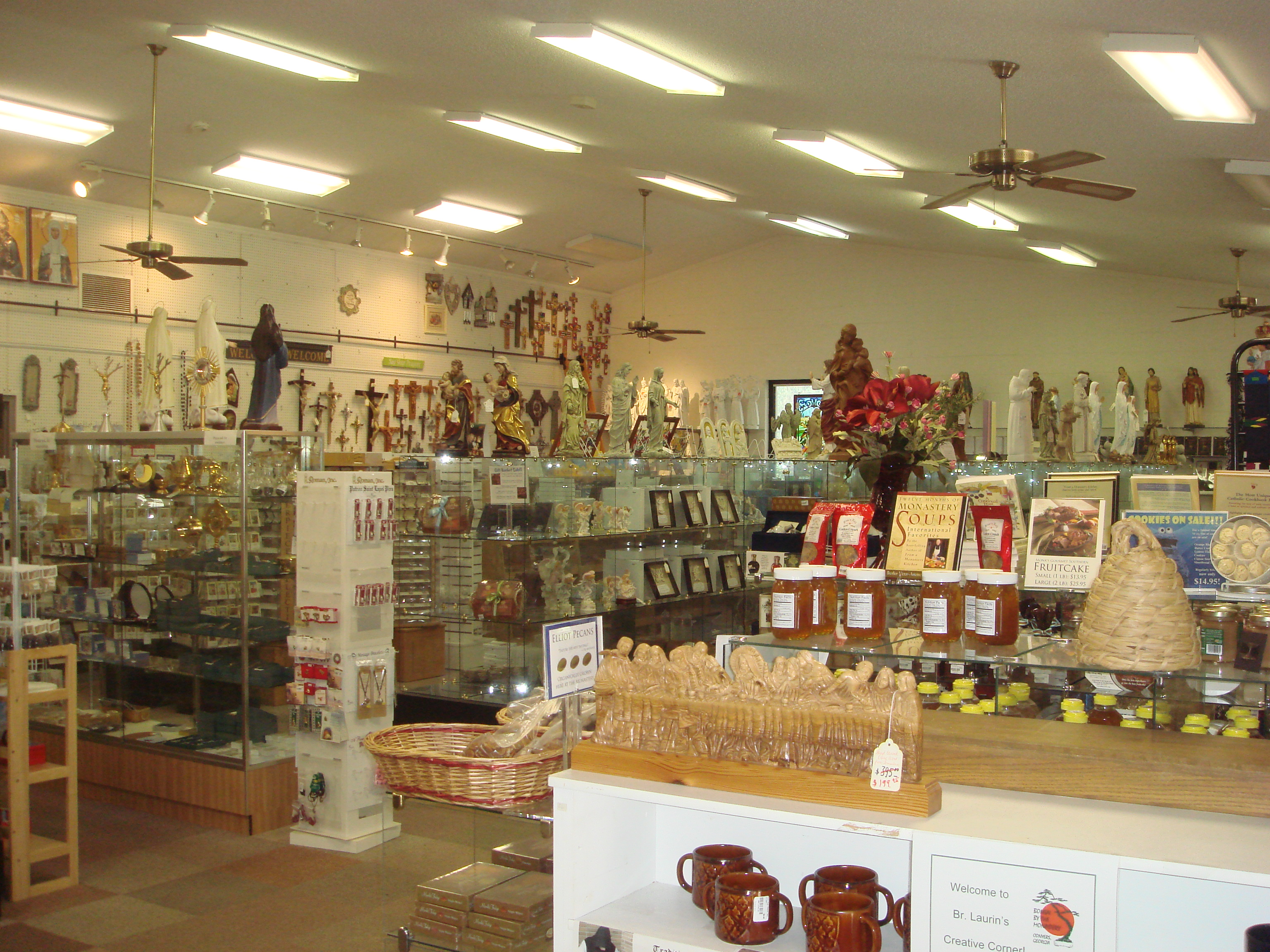
Interior view of the gift shop

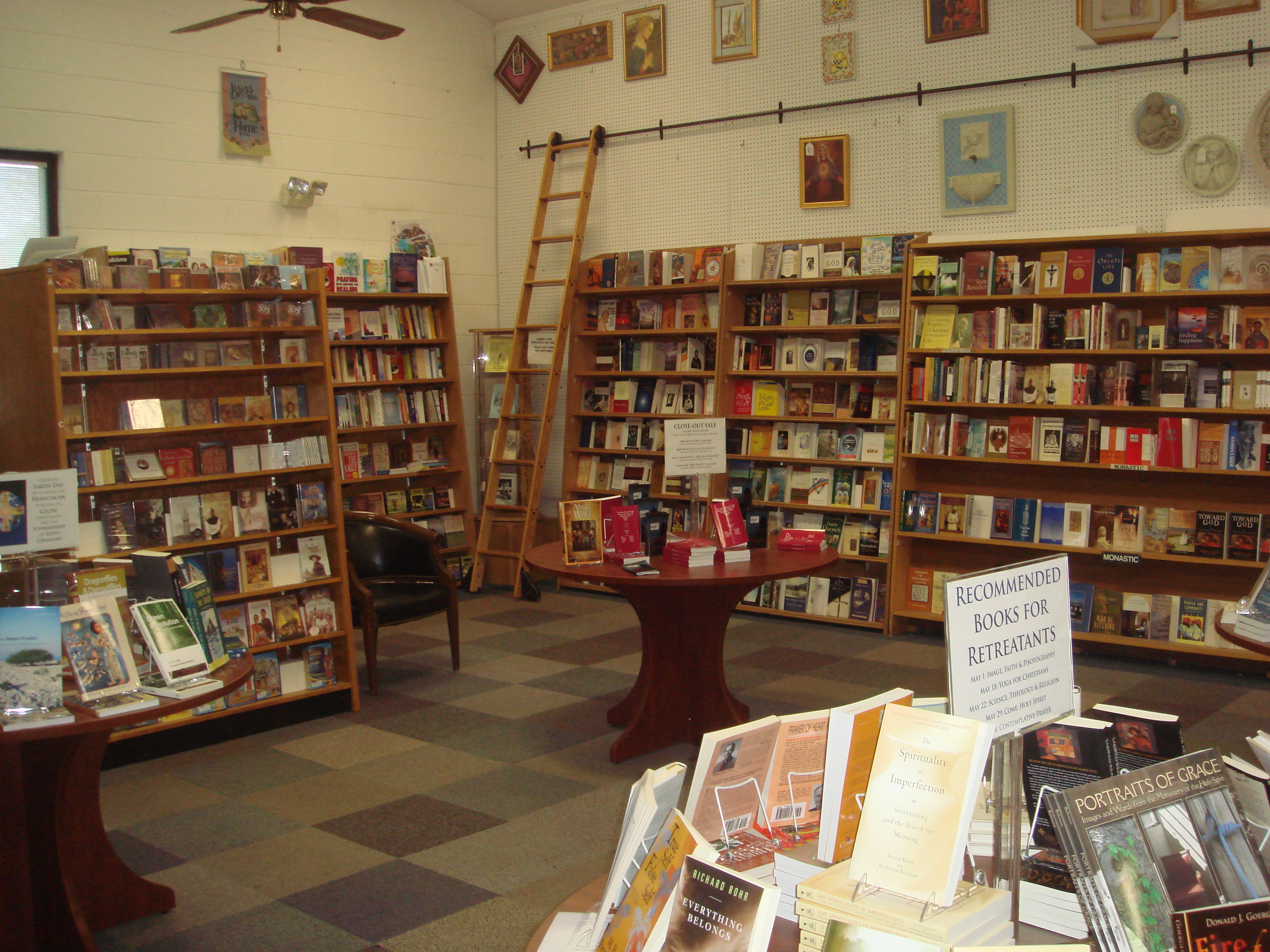
Interior view of the gift shop

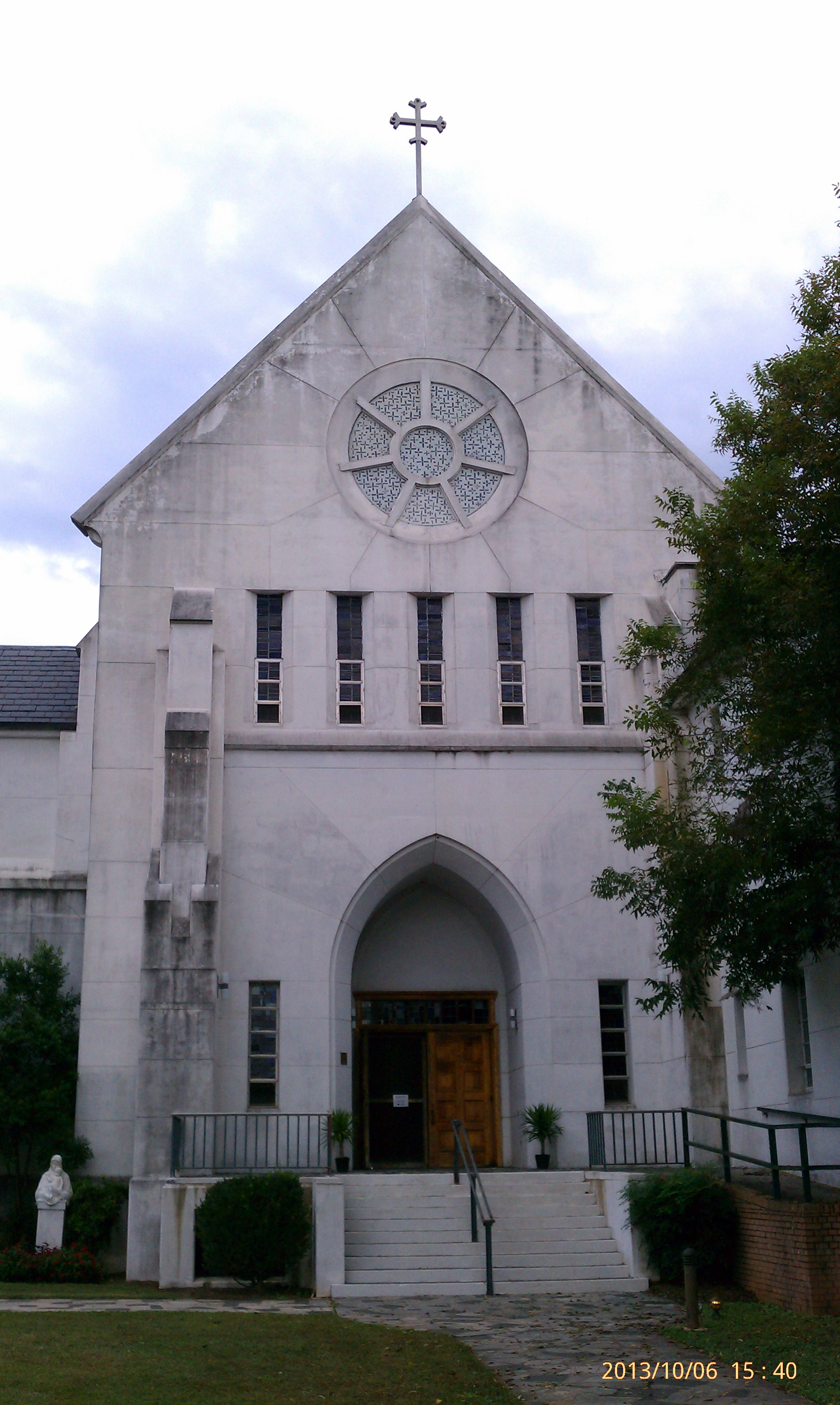
Front of the church

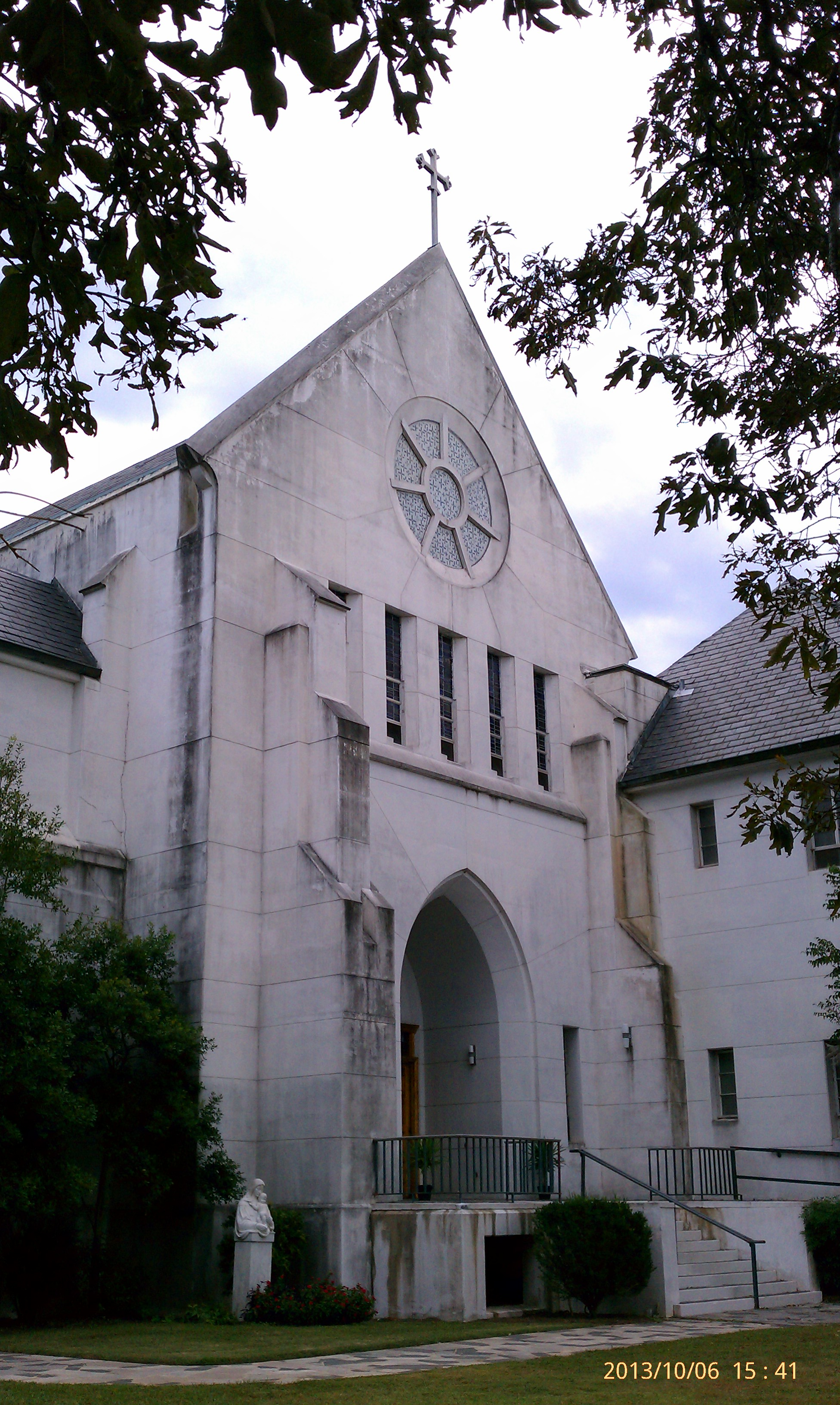
Side view of the church

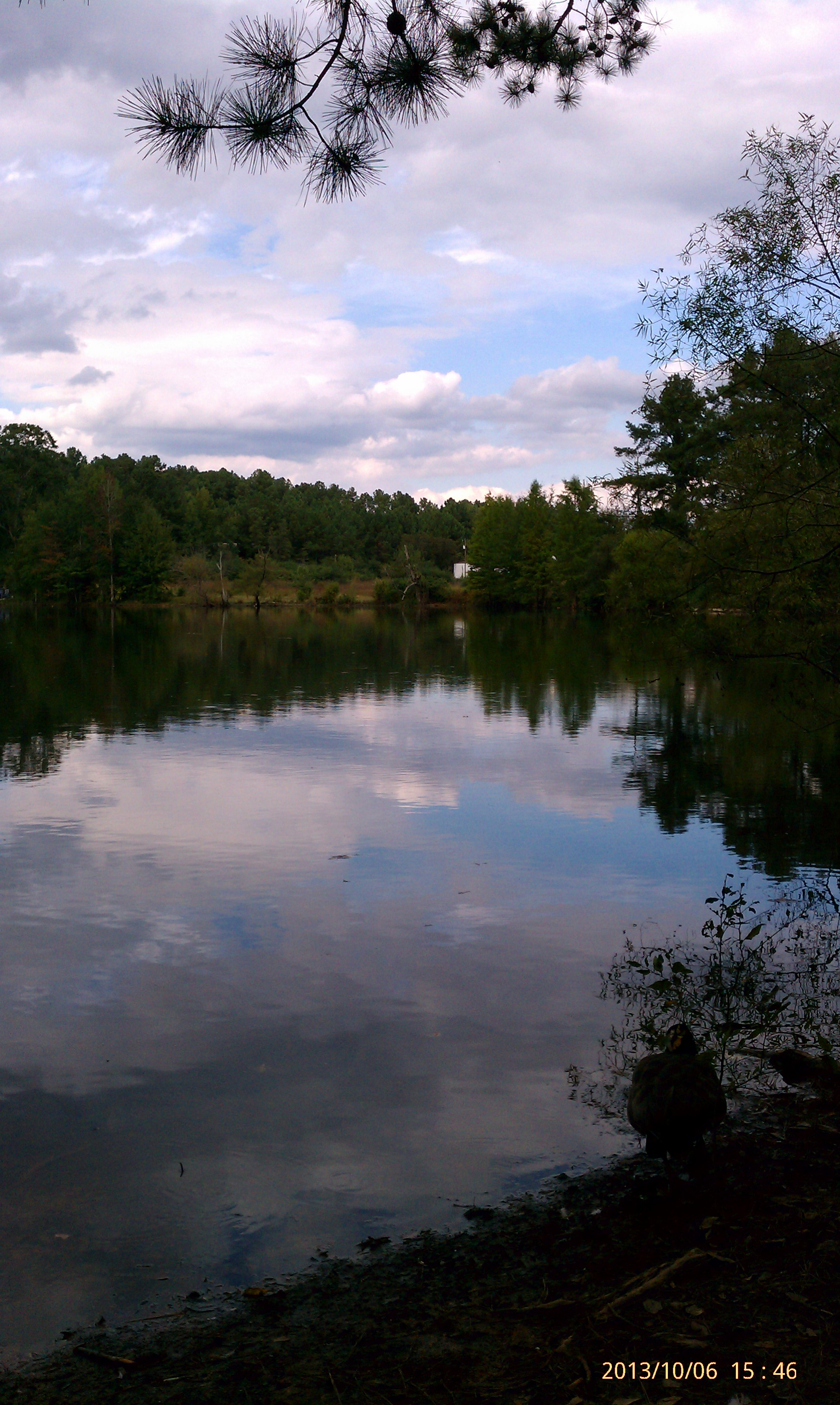
Lake

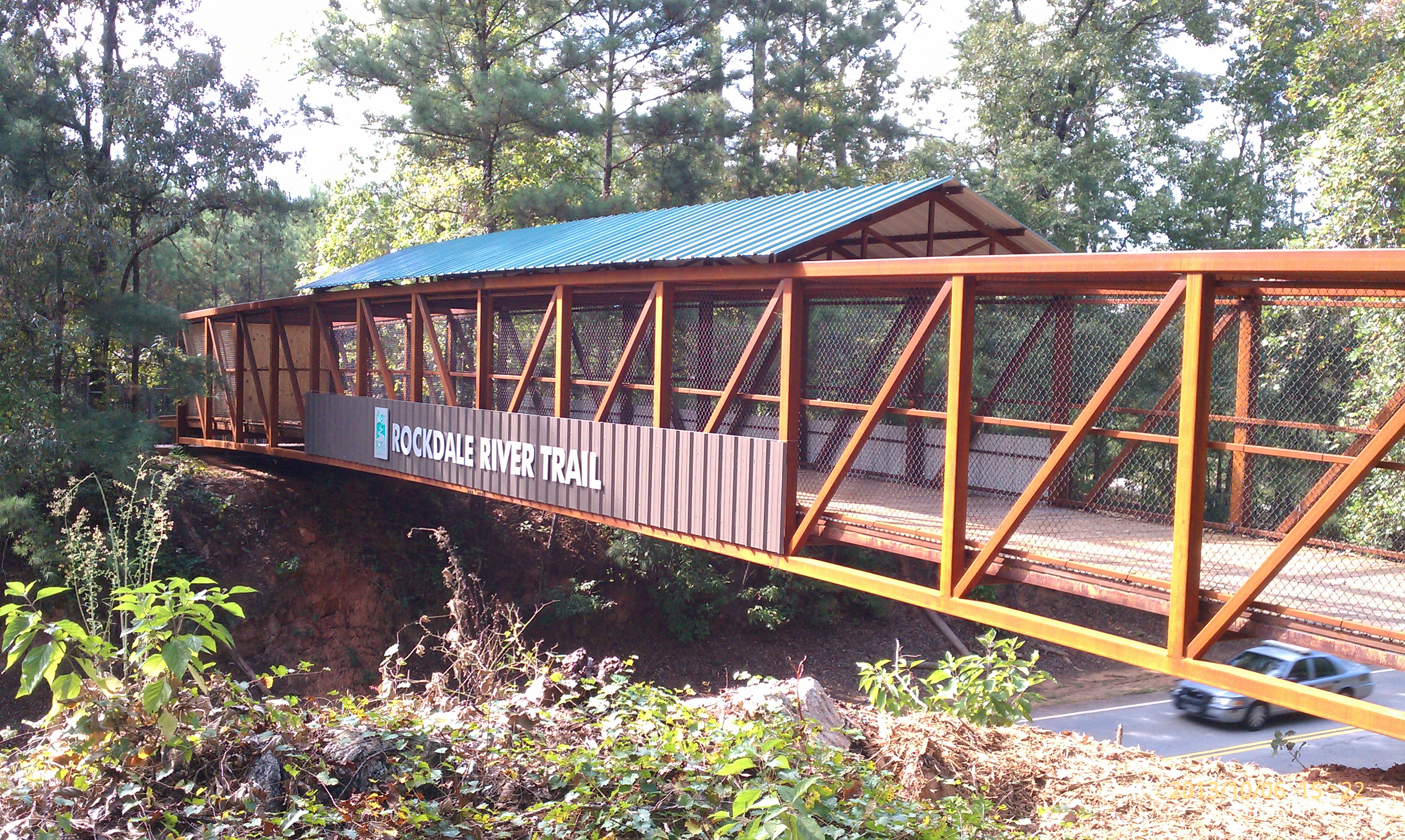
Rockdale River Trail bridge near the monastery

== See also ==
- Rule of Benedict
