= St. Joseph's Abbey (Massachusetts) =

Trappist monastery in Spencer, Massachusetts

Coordinates: 42°17′51.59″N 72°0′52.11″W

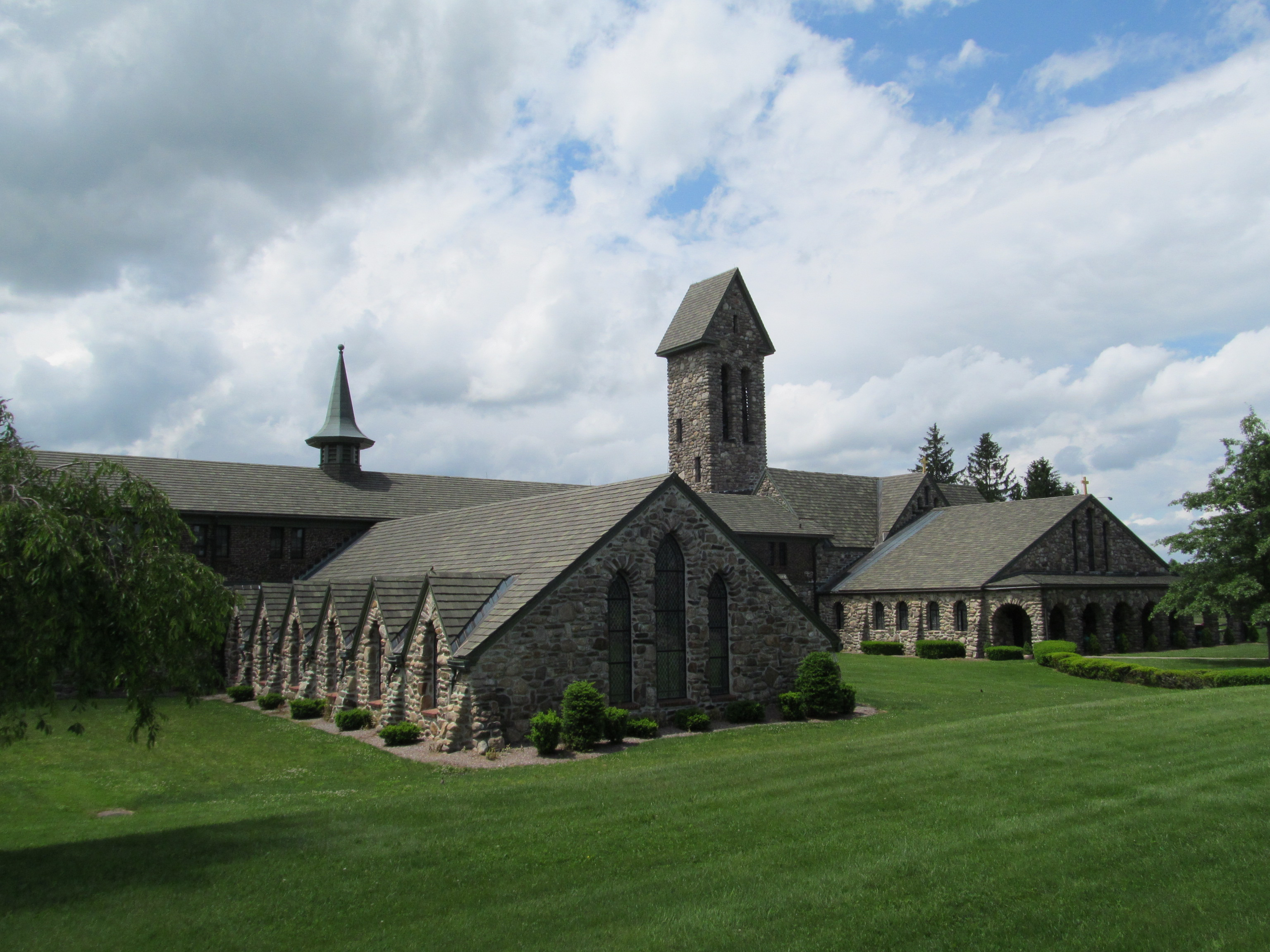
- St. Joseph's Abbey
- Interactive map of St. Joseph's Abbey

Monastery information
- Other name: Spencer Abbey
- Order: Trappists
- Denomination: Catholic
- Established: 1825 (Nova Scotia), 1900 (Rhode Island), 1950 (Spencer)
- Mother house: Bellefontaine Abbey
- Dedication: Saint Joseph
- Diocese: Worcester

People
- Founders: Vincent de Paul Merle, O.C.S.O.
- Abbot: Dom Timothy Scott, O.C.S.O.

Site
- Location: 167 North Spencer Road; Spencer, Massachusetts 01562
- Country: United States
- Public access: Yes
- Other information: Produces and markets Trappist Preserves and Holy Rood Guild Vestments
- Website: https://spencerabbey.org

St. Joseph's Abbey is an American Trappist monastery in Spencer, Massachusetts. The community of monks was founded in 1825 in Nova Scotia, Canada. In the early 20th century, their monastery was destroyed by fire and they moved to Rhode Island. In 1950, after another disastrous fire, the community was driven to move to Spencer. The monks produce jams and liturgical vestments in order to financially support their way of life. Retreats, informed by the monastic contemplative life of the abbey, are offered frequently for guests in the abbey retreat house.

== History ==
St. Joseph's Abbey is an abbey of the Order of Cistercians of the Strict Observance (Trappists). The monks trace the foundation of their way of life to the Rule of St. Benedict (written in c. 530). They seek to follow this rule strictly, according to the reforms of the first Cistercian monks in 1098 and the further reforms of the monks of La Trappe Abbey in 1664.

The community of monks that occupies St. Joseph Abbey was founded by Vincent de Paul Merle in Halifax, Nova Scotia in 1825. After a severe fire in 1892, the monks moved to Cumberland, Rhode Island. Following another fire and in consideration of the increase of population in the Cumberland area, the monks decided to move to the more-remote outskirts of Spencer, Massachusetts, in 1950. They built St. Joseph's Abbey on the former site of Alta Crest Farms, under the leadership of its first abbot, Edmund Futterer.

Thomas Keating was elected second abbot of the abbey in 1961. Keating, a leader in the contemplative prayer movement of his time, retired in 1981. Keating, along with fellow monks William Meninger and Basil Pennington, was noted for holding retreats at the abbey with the goal of teaching people to pray according to the Catholic contemplative tradition.

After the short term of Pascal Skutecky, Augustine Roberts became the fourth abbot in June 1984 and served two six-year terms. The fifth abbot, Damian Carr, was elected in June 1996.

Vincent Rogers was elected as the sixth abbot on 23 July 2020. Rogers was born in Santa Monica, California. He is a graduate of the University of California where he majored in engineering, psychology and education. He entered the monastery in 1977; made his solemn profession in 1986 and was ordained a priest in 2010.

Other notable monks of the abbey include Raphael Simon (1909-2006) and Simeon Leiva-Merikakis (1946-). Simon received his M.D. from the University of Michigan, interned at Bellevue Hospital, and practiced as a psychiatrist in New York. Following his conversion to Catholicism, he became a monk of St. Joseph's Abbey. He gave retreats to the monks of his Order in the United States and Ireland, and was a spiritual director for monks, priests and lay people. He authored, Hammer and Fire: Way to Contemplative Happiness and Mental Health.

Leiva-Merikakis became a monk of St. Joseph Abbey in 2003. Previously, he had earned a Ph.D. in Comparative Literature and Theology from Emory University as worked as a Professor of Literature and Theology at the University of San Francisco. He is an acclaimed preacher, retreat master, and author. He penned the four-volume series Fire of Mercy, Heart of the Word: Meditations on the Gospel According to Saint Matthew.

== Goods produced ==
=== Trappist Preserves ===
Trappist Preserves is a brand of fruit preserves produced and sold by the abbey. In 1954, shortly after their arrival in Spencer, a small, stove-top batch of mint jelly was made by Brother John Berchmans, one of the monks, with mint from their herb garden. Since monastic austerity at that time precluded the jelly from being served to the monks at meals, it was sold at the porters' lodge. The response to the jelly encouraged the monks to try making and selling other varieties. Soon, jelly-making proved to be a successful and compatible monastic industry, contributing about half of the income needed to run the abbey. The jams and jellies made by the monks are sold in supermarkets in the United States, particularly in the New England region. In 2005, the monks produced 1.7 million jars of preserves in 26 flavors, turning one and a half tons of fruit into preserves daily.

=== The Holy Rood Guild ===
The monks at the abbey make liturgical vestments under the brand of The Holy Rood Guild.

=== Spencer Brewery ===
Spencer Brewery was the name of the brewery run by the abbey that produced Trappist beer from 2013 to 2022. In 2010, St. Joseph's Abbey explored the possibility of brewing beer as other Trappist monasteries do, and sought guidance from brewers in Boston and several Trappist breweries in Europe. The first beer they produced was a blonde ale at 6.5% alcohol by volume which was called Spencer Trappist Ale. As of 2016, it was the first and only certified Trappist beer brewed in the United States.

In May 2022, St. Joseph's Abbey ceased beer production and closed Spencer Brewery. In addition to the economic impact of the COVID-19 pandemic, the New England region had grown to have over 600 craft breweries (according to the Brewers Association).
