= Thomas Keating =

American Cistercian monk and teacher of centering prayer

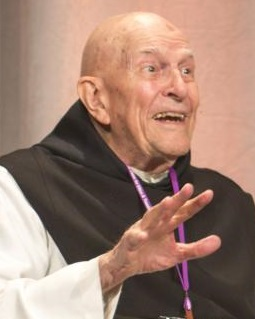
Thomas Keating in 2012

Thomas Keating, O.C.S.O. (March 7, 1923 – October 25, 2018) was an American Trappist priest known as one of the principal developers of centering prayer, a contemplative method that emerged from St. Joseph's Abbey in Spencer, Massachusetts.

== Life ==
Keating was born in New York City in March 1923 and attended Deerfield Academy, Yale University, and Fordham University.

In 1984 Keating, along with Gustave Reininger and Edward Bednar, co-founded Contemplative Outreach, Ltd., an international and ecumenical spiritual network that teaches the practice of Centering Prayer and Lectio Divina, a method of prayer drawn from the Christian contemplative tradition. Contemplative Outreach provides a support system for those on the contemplative path through a wide variety of resources, workshops, and retreats.

Keating died at St. Joseph's Abbey, Spencer, Massachusetts on 25 October 2018, aged 95 years old.

== Centering prayer ==
Keating was one of three principal developers of centering prayer, a contemporary method of contemplative prayer that emerged from St. Joseph's Abbey in 1975. William Meninger and Basil Pennington, also Trappist monks, were the method's other principal developers. When the concept was first proposed by Keating, Meninger started teaching a method based on the 14th-century spiritual classic The Cloud of Unknowing. Meninger referred to this as the "Prayer of the Cloud" and taught it to priests at the retreat house. Pennington gave the first retreat to a lay audience in Connecticut where the participants suggested the term "centering prayer". Since Thomas Merton had been known to use the term prior to this, it has been suggested the phrase may have originated from him.

== Panentheist views ==
In his 1993 article, Clarifications Regarding Centering Prayer, Keating suggests that Jesus describes a panentheistic rather than pantheistic view of God:

Pantheism is usually defined as the identification of God with creation in such a way that the two are indistinguishable. Panentheism means that God is present in all creation by virtue of his omnipresence and omnipotence, sustaining every creature in being without being identified with any creature. The latter understanding is what Jesus seems to have been describing when he prays "that all might be one, Father, as we are one" and "that they may also be in us" (John 17:22). Again and again, in the Last Supper discourse, he speaks of this oneness and his intentions to send his Spirit to dwell within us. If we understand the writings of the great mystics rightly, they experience God living within them all the time. Thus the affirmation of God's transcendence must always be balanced by the affirmation of his immanence both on the natural plane and on the plane of grace.

== Bibliography ==
Silence is the language God speaks, and everything else a bad translation, Fr. Thomas Keating

=== Books ===
- Crisis of Faith (1979) ISBN 0-932506-05-4
- Finding Grace at the Center (1979) ISBN 0-932506-00-3
- Heart of the World (1981) ISBN 0-8245-0014-8
- And the Word Was Made Flesh (1982) ISBN 0-8245-0505-0
- Open Mind, Open Heart: The Contemplative Dimension of the Gospel (1986) ISBN 0-8264-0696-3
- The Mystery of Christ: The Liturgy as Spiritual Experience (1987) ISBN 0-8264-0697-1
- Heart of the World: Spiritual Catechism (1988) ISBN 0-8245-0903-X
- Mystery of Christ (1988) ISBN 0-916349-41-1
- Awakenings (1990) ISBN 0-8245-1044-5
- Kundalini Energy and Christian Spirituality: A Pathway to Growth and Healing, by Philip St Romain, illus. Intro. by Thomas Keating (1991) ISBN 0-8245-1062-3
- Reawakenings (1991) ISBN 0-8245-1149-2
- Invitation to Love: The Way of Christian Contemplation (1992) ISBN 0-8264-0698-X
- Intimacy with God (1994) ISBN 0-8245-1588-9
- Loving Search for God: Contemplative Prayer and "The Cloud of Unknowing", with William A. Meninger (1994) ISBN 0-8264-0682-3
- Crisis of Faith, Crisis of Love (1995) ISBN 0-8264-0805-2
- Active Meditations for Contemplative Prayer (1997) ISBN 0-8264-1061-8
- The Kingdom of God is Like... (1997) ISBN 0-8245-1659-1
- Centering Prayer in Daily Life and Ministry, co-edited with Gustave Reininger (1998) ISBN 0-8264-1041-3
- The Diversity of Centering Prayer (1998) ISBN 0-8264-1115-0
- The Human Condition: Contemplation and Transformation (Wit Lectures) (1999) ISBN 0-8091-3882-4
- Journey to the Center: A Lenten Passage (1999) ISBN 0-8245-1895-0
- The Better Part: Stages of Contemplative Living (2000) ISBN 0-8264-1229-7
- Fruits and Gifts of the Spirit (2000) ISBN 1-930051-21-2
- St. Therese of Lisieux: A Transformation in Christ (2000) ISBN 1-930051-20-4
- Divine Indwelling: Centering Prayer and Its Development, with George F. Cairns, Thomas R. Ward, Sarah A. Butler, Fitzpatrick-Hopler (2001) ISBN 1-930051-79-4
- Sundays at the Magic Monastery: Homilies from the Trappists of St. Benedict's Monastery with William Meninger, Joseph Boyle, and Theophane Boyd (2002) ISBN 1-59056-033-7
- Transformation of Suffering: Reflections on September 11 and the Wedding Feast at Cana in Galilee (2002) ISBN 1-59056-036-1
- The Daily Reader for Contemplative Living: Excerpts from the Works of Father Thomas Keating, O.C.S.O. : Sacred Scripture, and Other Spiritual Writings (2003) ISBN 0-8264-1515-6
- Foundations for Centering Prayer and the Christian Contemplative Life: Open Mind, Open Heart, Invitation to Love, Mystery of Christ (2003) ISBN 0-8264-1397-8
- Manifesting God (2005) ISBN 1-59056-085-X
- Active Prayer: On Retreat with Father Thomas Keating (2005) ISBN 0-8264-1783-3
- Centering Prayer: On Retreat with Father Thomas Keating (2005) ISBN 0-8264-1780-9
- Lectio Divina: On Retreat with Father Thomas Keating (2005) ISBN 0-8264-1782-5
- Welcoming Prayer: On Retreat with Father Thomas Keating (2005) ISBN 0-8264-1781-7
- Divine Therapy and Addiction: Centering Prayer and the Twelve Steps (2009) ISBN 978-1-59056-144-7
- Reflections on the Unknowable (2014) ISBN 978-1590564370

=== Audio and video ===
- Contemplative Prayer (Audio, 1995) ISBN 1-56455-324-8
- The Contemplative Journey (Audio, 1997) ISBN 1-56455-537-2
- The Contemplative Journey, Vol. 2 (Audio, 1997) ISBN 1-56455-538-0
- Searching for God in America (Video, 1997)
- The Contemplative Journey (Audio CD) (2005) ISBN 1-59179-335-1
- Contemplative Prayer: Traditional Christian Meditations for Opening to Divine Union (Audio CD) (2005) ISBN 1-59179-306-8
