= Basil Pennington =

AAmerican Trappist priest (1931–2005)

M. Basil Pennington, O.C.S.O. (1931–2005) was an American Trappist priest and leading spiritual writer, speaker, teacher, and director. He became known internationally as one of the major proponents of the centering prayer movement begun at St. Joseph's Abbey in Spencer, Massachusetts, during the 1970s.

== Life ==
Pennington entered the Order of Cistercians of the Strict Observance at St. Joseph's Abbey in June 1951. He received the licentiate in Theology in 1959 from the Pontifical University of St. Thomas Aquinas Angelicum. He also earned a licentiate in Canon Law at the Pontifical Gregorian University. At St. Joseph's Abbey, he was appointed professor of theology in 1959, professor of canon law and professor of spirituality in 1963, and vocations director in 1978. In 2000, he was appointed superior at Assumption Abbey in Ava, Missouri, and later that same year he was elected abbot of the Monastery of the Holy Spirit in Conyers, Georgia. He returned to St. Joseph's Abbey after retiring in 2002. He died on June 3, 2005, the Feast of the Sacred Heart of Jesus, from injuries sustained from a car accident.

Bernard McGinn wrote that Pennington "not only wrote effectively about centering prayer, but he also traveled across the United States and the world spreading the practice through lectures and workshops. The renewal of contemplative prayer in the last decades of the twentieth century owes much to these efforts."

== Bibliography ==
Pennington's book Centering Prayer was first published in 1980, and had sold more than a million copies by 2002. Translations have been published in Spanish, French, Polish, Portuguese, and Italian. Pennington published a total of more than 60 books, including:

- Pennington, M. Basil (1980). Centering Prayer: Renewing an Ancient Christian Prayer Form. Garden City, NY: Doubleday. ISBN 0-385-14562-4. (222 pages).

- 1982 English edition by Image (Garden City, NY): ISBN 978-0-385-18179-2 (254 pages).
- 1989 English edition by St. Paul Publications: ISBN 978-971-504-344-1 (222 pages).
- 1998 English edition by St. Pauls: ISBN 978-81-7109-357-1 (219 pages).
- 2001 English edition by Doubleday (New York, NY): ISBN 0-385-18179-5 (260 pages).

- Monastic Journey to India (1982, 1999).
- Monastery: Prayer, Work, Community (1983).
- Called: New Thinking on Christian Vocation (1983).
- Daily We Follow Him: Learning Discipleship from Peter (1987).
- Mary Today (1987).
- Living Our Priesthood Today (1987).
- Prayertimes (1987).
- Through the Year with the Saints (1988).
- Monastic Life (1989).
- The Monastic Way (1990).
- The Fifteen Mysteries: In Image and Word (1993).
- Praying by Hand: Rediscovering the Rosary As a Way of Prayer (1995).
- Awake in the Spirit (1995).
- Daily We Touch Him (1997).
- A Place Apart: Monastic Prayer and Practice for Everyone (1998).
- Lectio Divina (1998).
- Centering Prayer in Daily Life and Ministry (1998).
- Centered Living: The Way of Centering Prayer (1999).
- Living in the Question: Meditations in the Style of Lectio Divina (1999).
- True Self/False Self: Unmasking the Spirit Within (2000).
- Eucharist: Wine of Faith, Bread of Life (2000).
- Listening: God's Word for Today (2000).
- The Bread of God: Nurturing a Eucharistic Imagination (2001).
- A School of Love: The Cistercian Way to Holiness (2001).
- The Abbey Prayer Book (2002).
- 20 Mysteries of the Rosary: A Scriptural Journey (2003).
- Call to the Center, Revised: Gospel's Invitation to Deeper Prayer (2003).
- Who Do You Say I Am?: Meditations on Jesus' Questions in the Gospels (2005).
