= Outline of plagiarism =

Presenting another author's work as own original work

The following outline is provided as an overview of and topical guide to plagiarism:

Plagiarism is the representation of another person's language, thoughts, ideas, or expressions as one's own original work. Although precise definitions vary depending on the institution, in many countries and cultures plagiarism is considered a violation of academic integrity and journalistic ethics, as well as of social norms around learning, teaching, research, fairness, respect, and responsibility. As such, a person or entity that is determined to have committed plagiarism is often subject to various punishments or sanctions, such as suspension, expulsion from school or work, fines, imprisonment, and other penalties.

== General concepts ==
- Cryptomnesia
- Geneivat da'at
- Self-plagiarism

== Types ==
=== Arts ===
- 18th-century American piracy of British literature
- Forgery
- Joke theft
- Musical plagiarism
- Sampling (music)
  - Legal issues surrounding music sampling
- Swipe (comics)

=== Academic/scientific ===
- Academic dishonesty
- Contract cheating
- Duplicate publication
- Essay mill
- Scientific misconduct

==== By location ====
- Scientific plagiarism in Germany
- Scientific plagiarism in India
- Scientific plagiarism in the United States

== Techniques ==
- Rogeting

== Works ==
=== Plagiarized or partially plagiarized works ===
==== Books ====
- Dobson's Encyclopedia
- Isis Unveiled

==== Music ====
- 1987 (What the Fuck Is Going On?)
- 300 Original Motion Picture Soundtrack
- "Come Together"
- H-Logic
- "My Sweet Lord"

=== Works about plagiarism ===
- An Uncommon Story

== Events/incidents ==
- 2008 Canadian federal election speech plagiarism
- Cooks Source infringement controversy
- Dershowitz–Finkelstein affair
- Ferenc Gyurcsány plagiarism controversy
- Legal disputes over the Harry Potter series
- Leibniz–Newton calculus controversy
- Martin Luther King, Jr. authorship issues
- Pál Schmitt academic misconduct controversy
- Plagiarism from Wikipedia
- Timbaland plagiarism controversy
- Voiceverse NFT plagiarism scandal
- Zsolt Semjén academic misconduct controversy

== Anti-plagiarism ==
- Dissernet
- Plagiarism detection
- VroniPlag Wiki

=== Software ===
- Comparison of anti-plagiarism software
- Copyscape
- IThenticate
- PlagScan
- PlagTracker
- TurnItIn
- Unplag

== Related concepts ==
- Appropriation (art)
- Authorship
- Cover version
- Derivative work
- Fair use
- Fraud
- Imitation (art)
- Intellectual property
- Journalistic scandal
- Originality
- Parody
- Pasticcio
- Pastiche
- Quotation
- Replica
- Tribute act
