= Comparison of anti-plagiarism software =

The following tables compare software used for plagiarism detection.

== General ==
Software	Developer	First public release	Latest stable version	License	Deployment options	Scripts supported	Notes
Copyscape	Indigo Stream Technologies, Ltd.	2004		freemium	SaaS	Latin	Targeted at website managers.
Copyleaks		2015					
Grammarly	Grammarly, Inc.		2016	freemium	SaaS	Latin	Checks against ProQuest databases and (public) web pages.
HelioBLAST	Virginia Bioinformatics Institute			?	(free of charge web service)	Latin	Submissions are limited to 1,000 words. Checking against abstract and titles in Medline/PubMed.
iThenticate	iParadigms	2004	2017	proprietary	SaaS	Latin	
PlagScan	PlagScan GmbH	2008		limited	SaaS, On-Premises	Latin, Cyrillic & Arabic	Submissions are checked against (public) online documents, a (private) shared repository, and the user's own (private) repository.
PlagTracker	Devellar	2011		freemium	SaaS	Latin, Cyrillic	Rated as "Useless for academic purposes" by Plagiats Portal
Turnitin	iParadigms	1997		proprietary	SaaS	Latin & multiple scripts through translation	Automatically stores uploaded texts (submitted for checking) in its own database.
Unicheck	Unicheck	2014	SaaS	proprietary	SaaS	Latin, Cyrillic	Pricing "per page" based on 137.5 words per nominal page.
