= Plag =

Plag, PLAG, or plag may refer to:

- PLAG1, a protein
- Plagiarism, the wrongful appropriation of another author's work
  - PlagTracker, a plagiarism detection software
  - PlagScan, a plagiarism detection software
  - VroniPlag Wiki, a wiki on plagiarism in German doctoral theses
- Plagioclase, a solid solution series of minerals in the feldspar group
