= Hassan Rouhani plagiarism allegations =

Allegations against Hassan Rouhani for plagiarism in books written by him

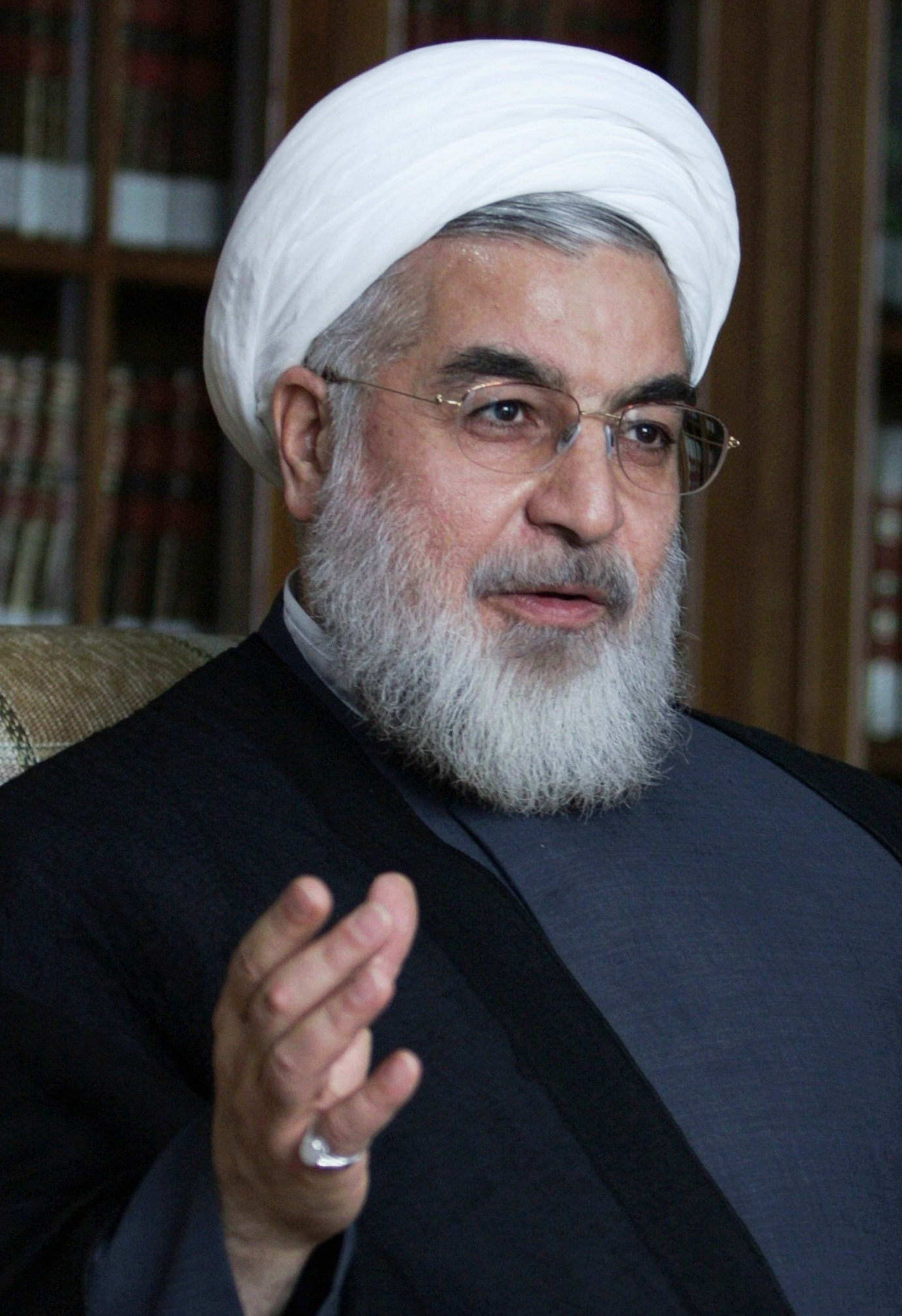
Hassan Rouhani, (the then) President of Iran

Allegations regarding Hassan Rouhani's plagiarism were first raised in 2013 when it was claimed that he had probably "lifted" sentences from a book by Afghan author, Mohammad Hashim Kamali. Glasgow Caledonian University, Rouhani's graduation school, argued that the sentences were both cited properly. The issue was raised again amid 2017 Iranian presidential election when a student campaign claimed that they had for the first time investigated Rouhani's whole thesis using plagiarism detection tool iThenticate and that chapters one through four of Rouhani's thesis had been plagiarized at least 39%, 43%, 40% and 82%, respectively. Ayatollah Ali Akbar Kalantari, a member of Assembly of Experts, Shiraz University faculty member and one of the alleged victims, said that "major segments" of Chapter 4 of Rouhani's thesis had been translated from his book without being referenced.

Sadegh Zibakalam, reformist political science professor at University of Tehran, accused Rouhani's rival of politicizing the case right before the elections. Mohammad Mehdi Zahedi, head of Iranian Parliament's Commission on Education and Research, said that he had found major plagiarisms in chapter 4 of Rouhani's thesis and that the case would be investigated in Education and Research Commission. 50 student-run organizations as well as Shiraz University faculty professors asked Ali Akbar Kalantari to prosecute the case in separate letters.

== Background ==
According to the Telegraph in 2013, Hassan Rouhani had apparently plagiarized from a book by Afghan author, Mohammad Hashim Kamali. Glasgow Caledonian University said that they had found references to the mentioned book, both within the main body and the bibliography. After the allegations were raised by the western media, Glasgow Caledonian University published the abstracts of Rouhani's Master and PhD thesis. According to Foreign Policy, the sentences "...it leaves room for flexibility in the evaluation of its injunctions...The Qur’an is not specific on the precise value of its injunctions, and it leaves open the possibility that a command in the Qur’an may sometimes imply an obligation, a recommendation or a mere permissibility" and "As a characteristic feature of Qur’anic legislation, it may be stated here that commands and prohibitions in the Qur’an are expressed in a variety of forms which are often open to interpretation and ijtihad" which are found in Rouahni's thesis dated July 1998, were "lifted" from the work by Hashem Kamali first published in 1991:

"The primary source of the Islamic law (the Quran) is, in itself, flexible on the basis of the analysis that the Quranic legislation leaves room for flexibility in the evaluation of its injunctions. The Quran is not specific on the precise value of its injunctions, and it leaves open the possibility that a command in the Quran may sometimes imply an obligation, a recommendation or a mere permissibility. Commands and prohibitions in the Quran are expressed in a variety of forms which are often open to interpretation."

Sayed Hassan Amin, Rouhani's doctoral thesis supervisor, denied the allegations in an interview with BBC Persian and said that there was "no doubt about the authenticity of the thesis."

== 2017 presidential election ==
The allegations were raised again by state news agencies amid the 2017 Iran presidential election.

=== Student campaign ===
A group of Iranian students based in Iran and the United States formed a campaign investigating the case. The campaign published the results of their investigation on their website and on Twitter. The nongovernmental organization Justice and Transparency Watch (DAAD) founded in 2015 by "a group of then-parliamentarians and conservative political figures" is described on the campaign's website as the backer of the campaign. According to the group, plagiarism detection tool iThenticate was used for the analysis of the thesis and the results reportedly showed that chapters one through four of Rouhani's thesis have been plagiarized at least 39%, 43%, 40% and 82%, respectively. According to Keivan Ebrahimi, Iranian PhD student at Iowa State University and a member of the campaign, most parts of the Rouhani's thesis are copied from the works by Ebrahim Kalantari, Ziauddin Sardar, Noel James Coulson, Hamid Enayat, Wael Hallaq, Sayyid Abul A'la Maududi, Patrick Bannerman, Mohammad Hashim Kamali and William Montgomery Watt. In response to a question in this regard, Rouhani said that he had graduated from an international credible university and that he had not achieved his degree in exchange for land.

Alef website published the final result of the investigations referring to the student campaign's website, Rouhanithesis. According to the word count results the whole thesis was consisted of 101500 words with 16700, 11000, 9400, 5400, 3000, 2250, 2075 and 1600 words being copied from the works by Ali Akbar Kalantari, Ahmad Hassan, Mohammad Hashim Kamali, Seyyed Abbas Salehi, Jom'e Meqdadi, Wael Hallaq, Chibli Mallat and Morteza Motahhari, respectively.

Sadegh Zibakalam, a professor at Tehran University in Rouhani's camp, accused Rouhani's rival of politicizing the case. "If [members of the campaign and their backers] claim to be ethical, nonpolitical people, why didn’t they go after [plagiarism claims] before and [why did they only begin] to spread their accusations right before the election?" asked Zibakalam. According to Al-Monitor, the campaign seek "both political and academic objectives." In response to the question asking Keivan Ebrahimi why they had raised the allegations right before the elections, he answered that there was no access on their part to the thesis full text from GCU until it was obtained prior to the elections from an Iranian institute affiliated with Iran's Ministry of Science.

=== Prosecution by Ali Akbar Kalantari ===
Ayatollah Ali Akbar Kalantari, a member of Assembly of Experts, said that "major segments" of Chapter 4 of Rouhani's thesis had been translated from his book "without any reference to the original text or the name of the author." Mohammad Farhadi, Minister of Science, denied the allegation while Kalantari described Farhadi's reaction as "hasty". In a letter to Mohammad Mehdi Zahedi, head of Iranian Parliament's Commission on Education and Research, Kalantari urged legal prosecution of what he described as Rouhani's plagiarizing his book. Zahedi said that he had personally put "enough time" on the "strong" documents he had been given and that as an academic, and not a politician, he believed that major parts in the fourth chapter of Rouhani's PhD thesis had been plagiarized from Kalantari's book. According to First Vice Chief Justice of Iran, Gholam-Hossein Mohseni-Eje'i, the case may be addressed by the Special Clerical Court, if there's a private plaintiff.

==== Reactions ====
Various groups of Iranian student activists such as Student Basij and Islamic Society of Students addressed Kalantari by sending letters and asked him to prosecute the case. According to the Student News Network, Twitter hashtag #Plagiarism (Persian: سرقت_علمی) became the first trend in Iran on 25 July 2017. On 8 August 2017, faculty professors from Shiraz University publicized a letter they had penned a week earlier to Iranian Parliament's Article 90 Commission along with a 250-page document. They called for action to preserve the rights of their colleague, Ali Akbar Kalantari. On 27 August 2017, they penned a second letter to Iranian Parliament Speaker Ali Larijani, questioning Rouhani's qualifications to stand a second term as the nation's president.
