= Literal translation =

Word-for-word translation of a text

Literal translation, direct translation, word-for-word translation, word-by-word translation, or word-to-word translation is the translation of a text done by translating each word separately without analysing how the words are used together in a phrase or sentence.

In translation theory, another term for literal translation is metaphrase (as opposed to paraphrase for an analogous translation). It is to be distinguished from an interpretation (done, for example, by an interpreter).

Literal translation often leads to mistranslation of idioms, which can be a serious problem for machine translation.

== Translation studies ==
=== Usage ===
The term "literal translation" often appeared in the titles of 19th-century English translations of the classical Bible and other texts.

=== Cribs ===
Word-for-word translations ("cribs", "ponies", or "trots") are sometimes prepared for writers who are translating a work written in a language they do not know.

=== Poetry to prose ===
Literal translation can also denote a translation that represents the precise meaning of the original text but does not attempt to convey its style, beauty, or poetry. There is, however, a great deal of difference between a literal translation of a poetic work and a prose translation. A literal translation of poetry may be in prose rather than verse but also be error-free. Charles Singleton's 1975 translation of the Divine Comedy is regarded as a prose translation.

== Bad practice ==
=== Examples ===
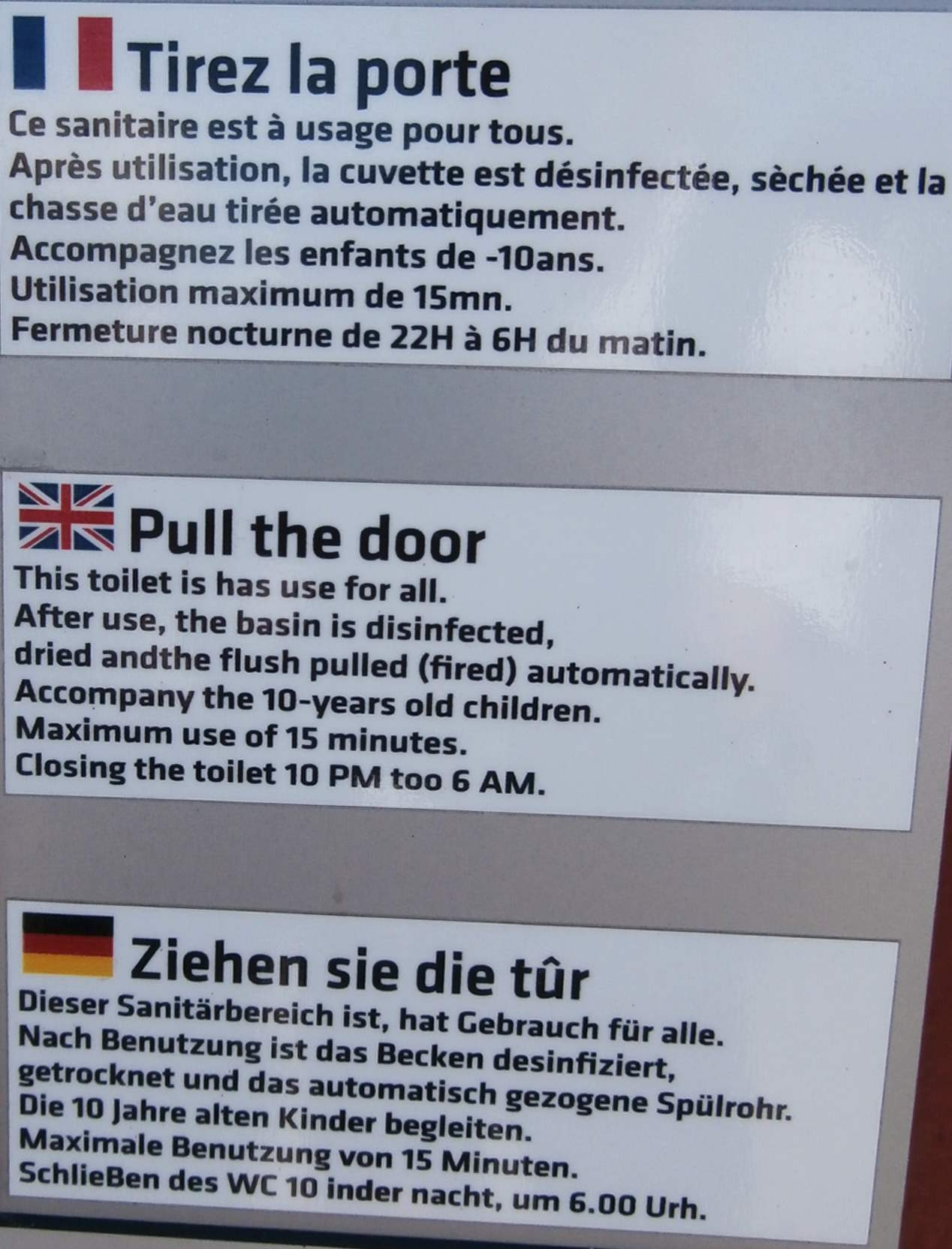
Example of broken English and German directly translated from French

The literal translation of the German phrase "Ich habe Hunger" into English is "I have hunger". This is not typical phrasing used in English, even though its meaning might be clear enough to be understood. A more meaningful (but no longer literal) translation of the phrase would be "I am hungry".

Literal translations in which individual components within words or compounds are translated to create new lexical items in the target language (a process also known as "loan translation") are called calques.

The literal translation of the Italian sentence, "So che questo non va bene" is "[I] know that this not [it] goes well", which has English words but Italian grammar, making it difficult to understand. A more accurate translation is "I know that this does not go well".

=== Machine translation ===
Early machine translations (as of 1962 at least) were notorious for this type of translation, as they simply employed a database of words and their translations. Later attempts utilized common phrases, which resulted in better grammatical structure and the capture of idioms, but with many words left in the original language. For translating synthetic languages, a morphosyntactic analyzer and synthesizer are required.

Systems today use a combination of the above technologies and apply algorithms to correct the "natural" sound of the translation. Professional translation firms that employ machine translation use it as a tool to create a rough translation that is then tweaked by a human, professional translator.

Douglas Hofstadter gave an example of a failure of machine translation: the English sentence "In their house, everything comes in pairs. There's his car and her car, his towels and her towels, and his library and hers." might be translated into French as "Dans leur maison, tout vient en paires. Il y a sa voiture et sa voiture, ses serviettes et ses serviettes, sa bibliothèque et les siennes." That does not make sense because it does not distinguish between "his" car and "hers".

=== Pidgins ===
Often, first-generation immigrants create something of a literal translation in how they speak their parents' native language. This results in a mix of the two languages that is something of a pidgin. Many such mixes have specific names, e.g., Spanglish or Denglisch. For example, American children of German immigrants are heard using "rockingstool" from the German word Schaukelstuhl instead of "rocking chair".

== Translator's humor ==
Literal translation of idioms is a source of translators' jokes. One such joke, often told about machine translation, translates "The spirit is willing, but the flesh is weak" (an allusion to Mark 14:38) into Russian and then back into English, getting "The vodka is good, but the meat is rotten". This is not an actual machine-translation error, but rather a joke which dates back to 1956 or 1958. Another joke in the genre transforms "out of sight, out of mind" to "blind idiot" or "invisible idiot".

== See also ==
- All your base are belong to us – Internet meme from a video game stemming from literal translation
- Dynamic and formal equivalence – Two dissimilar translation approaches
- Literal Standard Version – Modern English translation of the Bible
- Semantic translation
- Transliteration
- Young's Literal Translation – 1862 translation of the Bible into English
- English as She Is Spoke
