= Unicheck =

Cloud-based plagiarism detection

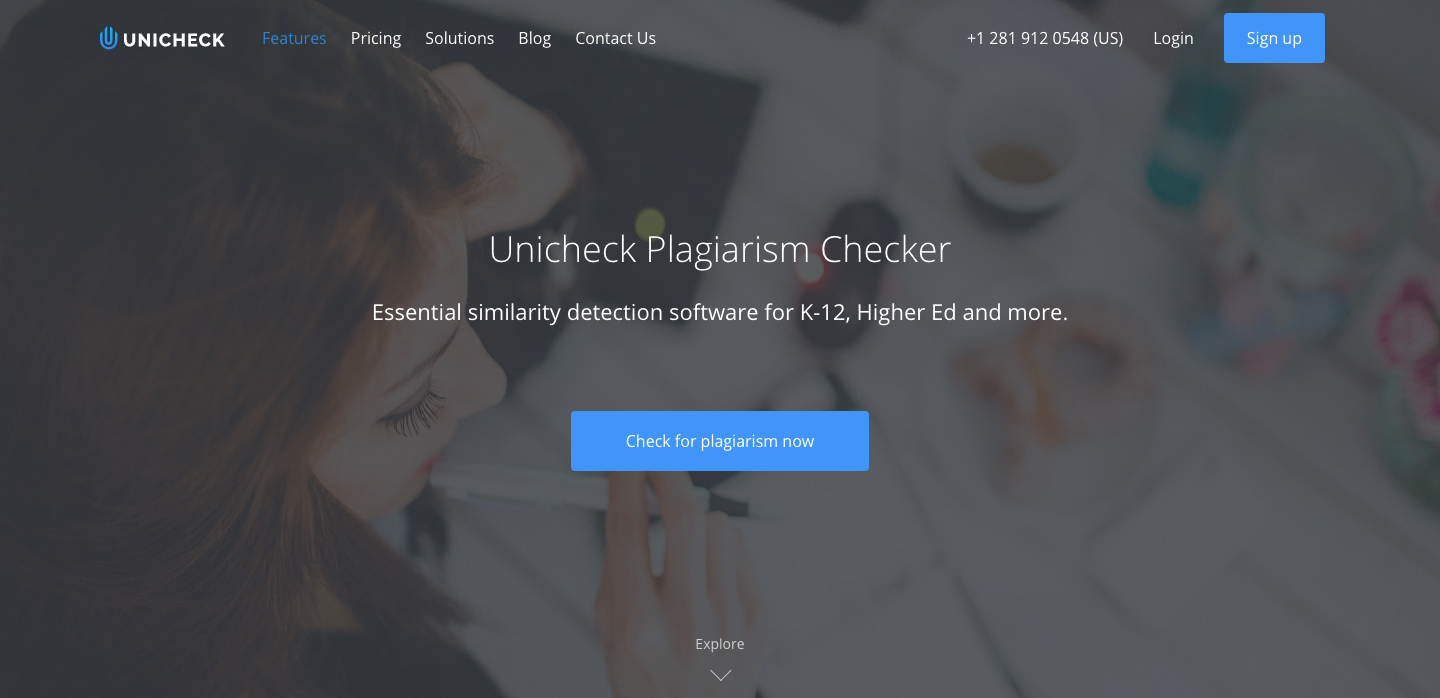
- Website type: Plagiarism and Similar Content Checker
- Owner: Turnitin
- Website: unicheck.com
- Commercial: Yes
- Current status: Active

Unicheck (previously known as Unplag) is a cloud-based plagiarism detection software that finds similarities, citations and references in texts.

Unicheck is primarily used in K-12 and higher education, and is utilised by more than 400 institutions worldwide. The tool is also used as a stand-alone checker by individual users like writers, editors, bloggers and lawyers.

== History ==
Unicheck was produced and launched by IT company Phase One Karma in 2014 under the name Unplag. In 2016 Unicheck partnered with the XСulture project and became a Certified Partner with the Canvas learning management system by Instructure (in 2017 it gained a status of Canvas Alliance Partner). In the summer of 2017, Unicheck became the first plagiarism checker to integrate with Google Classroom. It has also released a new type of integration with Canvas, called “native” and based on both LTI and API. After that in January 2018 Unicheck released an Add-on for Google Docs.

In 2020, Unicheck created by Phase One Karma was acquired by Turnitin. Unicheck will continue to operate as a separate plagiarism service.

== Functionality ==
Unicheck offers search and recognition functionality for similarities, citations, and references in texts. It can also discover characters that have been replaced in the text from another alphabet — for example, similar characters from the Cyrillic and Latin alphabets. To find similarities and paraphrases, checks are performed against the Internet (web pages indexed by Yahoo and Google), open source repositories, and user's internal library or database. The check results are presented as a similarity report, where each of the similarities that have been found has a link to the source. These reports can be downloaded as PDF documents.

Unicheck can be used as a stand-alone online tool, or integrated into an LMS (Learning Management System) via plugin, LTI, API or LTI+API types of integrations.

Unicheck is compatible with the following file formats: .doc, .docx, .rtf, .txt, .odt, .ppt, .pptx, .html, .pdf, .pages, as well as rar and zip archives, and files uploaded from Google Drive, oneDrive and Dropbox. Unicheck allows users to store documents in their internal library. Global settings allow adjustment of check sensitivity and enable users to choose whether they want to share their checked documents with Unicheck's database. Each newly signed-up user receives 5 trial pages.

== Technology ==
Unicheck uses an algorithm that searches for similar text on web pages, in open source repositories, and in the user's internal library. Accuracy of search is achieved by using the algorithm that divides text into small shifting sequences and uses them to look for similarities and by using live web index, which enables checks against all web pages.

The technology was developed by computer science engineers and professors. In 2017, the technology was improved by adding natural language processing (NLP) principles. This enabled the system to recognise synonyms and find paraphrased content in the checked text. The algorithm has been compared to latent semantic indexing, a method used by Google to determine connections between words and phrases.

The technology can recognise citations and references in the text, given they are properly formatted according to any of the academic styles. Currently, the technology recognises APA, MLA, Chicago, Turabian, and Harvard styles. The speed of checks per page is 4 seconds.

== See also ==
- Comparison of anti-plagiarism software
- Educational technology
