= Phase One Karma =

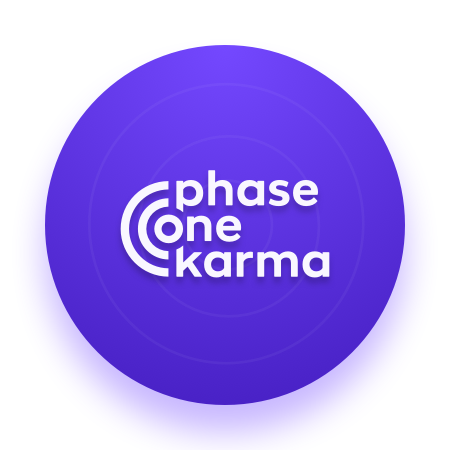
- Website type: Internet Technology AI Software
- Owner: P1K.org
- Website: p1k.org
- Commercial: Yes
- Current status: Active

Phase One Karma (P1K) is an IT company developing products based on Artificial Intelligence (AI) technologies. The company produced Unicheck (a part of Turnitin since 2020), a cloud-based plagiarism detection software; Lawrina, a legaltech website; and Otomistrz, a sales website for home service professionals and homeowners.

== History ==
Phase One Karma (P1K) was founded in 2014 to create a meaningful impact through developing innovative software products. In 2014 Unicheck (Unplag until 2017) became the company's first Machine Learning (ML) and Natural Language Processing-based product to confront student plagiarism in schools and universities. In 2019 Unicheck became a thriving technology product, reaching over one million users in more than 90 countries. In 2020, Unicheck was acquired by Turnitin to improve innovative technologies in education and administration.

As part of the internal R&D department, the P1K team developed EMMA, an authorship verification algorithm, to combat plagiarism. EMMA is based on Natural Language Understanding (NLU) technology, verifying authorship through writing style. The algorithm was integrated into Unicheck. EMMA defines the authorship of the text with a probability of 92%, using only three texts of 300 to 1000 words each. At the development stage, EMMA was tested on texts in The Washington Post, The New York Times, The Daily Telegraph, The Times, The Wall Street Journal, and other media

From 2019 onwards, Phase One Karma has developed AI-based projects applicable to various industries. By announcing its new investment, the company launched Otomistrz, a Polish marketplace for household professionals and their potential customers. The embedded AI technologies, patented by Phase One Karma, help connect specialists and their clients via particular search criteria on Otomistrz and minimize potential competitive risk.

In 2021, Phase One Karma created Lawrina, an informative legaltech platform with a U.S. law database, legal blog articles, and webinars for legal professionals and non-lawyers.

In 2022, Lawrina moved from informational materials to the development of DIY legal services, such as creating professional legal documents and searching for a lawyer to solve various legal issues in the U.S.

Phase One Karma also established Loio, a Microsoft Word add-in that helps legal professionals and contract specialists transform routine, tiresome paperwork. Loio offers the features of AI contract analysis and a collection of over 800 clauses for various types of legal documents.

Later, Loio became a part of Lawrina, which marked the formation of a complete ecosystem of legaltech products:

- Templates –– a collection of professional legal document templates available for online editing;
- Match –– a marketplace for individuals searching for a legal professional across the U.S. This product also serves as an online directory for lawyers who can demonstrate their expertise, promote their law firm services, and acquire potential clients;
- Guides –– a library of articles and how-to guides about legal processes and U.S. law;
- Loio –– an AI-powered software for drafting and reviewing legal contracts;
- Sign –– an electronic signature tool for personal user files and newly created documents on Lawrina.

== See also ==
- Educational technology
