= Plagiarism from Wikipedia =

Contributors to the online encyclopedia Wikipedia, often referred to as Wikipedians, license their submitted content under a Creative Commons license, which permits re-use as long as attribution is given. However, there have been a number of occasions when persons have failed to give the necessary attribution and attempted to pass off material from Wikipedia as their own work. Such plagiarism is a violation of the Creative Commons license and, when discovered, can be a reason for embarrassment, professional sanctions, or legal issues.

In educational settings, students sometimes copy Wikipedia to fulfill class assignments. A 2011 study by Turnitin found that Wikipedia was the most copied website by both secondary and higher education students.

== Notable instances ==
Many notable individuals and institutions have been credibly said to have committed plagiarism from Wikipedia.

- David Agus
- Chris Anderson
- Jill Bialosky
- Monica Crowley
- Elsevier retracted a 2020 book for plagiarizing many large passages from Wikipedia
- Five Star Movement (Italian political party)
- Jane Goodall
- Kamala Harris
- Michel Houellebecq
- Naoki Hyakuta
- International Baccalaureate Organisation (IBO) was accused of copying confidential examiner marking guides from Wikipedia
- Internet Research Agency
- Benny Johnson
- Siniša Mali, Serbian Finance Minister since 2018 and Deputy Prime Minister since 2024, who was found by the University of Belgrade to have plagiarized his Ph.D. thesis
- John McCain
- Yana Milev
- Okayama Prefectural Assembly
- Oxford University Press
- Neri Oxman
- Rand Paul
- The Pentagon
- Rachel Reeves, in her 2023 book The Women Who Made Modern Economics
- Santa Clara County grant writer
- Peter Schweizer, in his 2018 book Secret Empires
- Government of the United Kingdom, in its 2022 "Levelling Up" white paper
- Gerónimo Vargas Aignasse
- Fabiola Yáñez
- Alejandro Zaera-Polo

== See also ==
- Index of plagiarism articles
- Circular reporting § Circular reporting on Wikipedia
