= Metaphrase =

Literal (word-for-word) translation

Metaphrase is a term referring to literal translation, i.e., "word by word and line by line" translation. In everyday usage, metaphrase means literalism; however, metaphrase is also the translation of poetry into prose. Unlike "paraphrase," which has an ordinary use in literature theory, the term "metaphrase" is only used in translation theory.

Metaphrase is one of the three ways of transferring, along with paraphrase and imitation, according to John Dryden. Dryden considers paraphrase preferable to metaphrase (as literal translation) and imitation.

The term metaphrase was first used by Philo Judaeus (20 BCE) in De vita Mosis. Quintilian draws a distinction between metaphrase and paraphrase in the pedagogical practice of imitation and reworking of classical texts; he points out that metaphrase changes a word, and paraphrase, a phrase: a distinction that is also followed by Renaissance scholars.

== Sources ==
- Baker, Mona; Malmkjær, Kirsten (1998). Routledge encyclopedia of translation studies. Routledge. ISBN 0-415-09380-5.
