= Yana Milev =

German cultural theorist and sociologist

Yana Milev is a German cultural theorist, sociologist, ethnographer, and curator.

== Life ==
Yana Milev was born in Leipzig, East Germany, as the first child of the Bulgarian physician and anthropologist Gancho Milev, who had immigrated to the GDR in the early 1960s, and the Leipzig-based translator and interpreter Karin Fahr-Mileva. Upon completing secondary school in what was then still the GDR, she began a course of study in scenography and costume design at the Dresden Academy of Fine Arts (HfBK), which she ultimately completed with a diploma conferred after German unification. Thereafter, she undertook postgraduate study as a master's student of Günter Hornig. In the final years of the GDR, Milev was active in the country's subcultures. She became known for independent films, performances, and conceptual art.

Beginning in 1992, she was visible on the international art market as an artist affiliated with the Galerie EIGEN+ART (Leipzig and Berlin). In 1995, she became the first GDR artist to receive the Max-Pechstein-Prize. Likewise, as the first GDR woman artist to do so, Milev exhibited work at documenta X in 1997. With the support of a fellowship from the German Academic Exchange Service (DAAD), Milev traveled to Japan, where she conducted ethnographic studies and trained in the traditional Japanese martial arts Kyudō and Aikidō in Kyōto. In 1999, she earned the Sho-Dan of the Zen Nippon Kyudō Renmei (全日本弓道連) in Tokyo.

Upon her return from Japan in 2003, Milev was released by her gallerist, Gerd Harry Lybke. Her top career as an artist was ending promptly, and she was forced to embark on a new life course. Milev completed under the advisorship of Peter Sloterdijk a doctoral studies in philosophy at the Academy of Fine Arts Vienna and the Karlsruhe University of Arts and Design (HfG). To finance her PhD studies, in 2004 she became an instructor and project leader at the Zurich University of the Arts (ZHdK), initially at the Institute for Design Research and, in 2013, at the Institute of Cultural Studies in the Arts (ICS). Simultaneously, she was active in undertaking curatorial projects at the Zurich University of the Arts and the Karlsruhe Center for Art and Media (ZKM).

In 1989, Milev met the violinist and photographer Philipp Beckert, her partner in collaborative projects to the present day. In 2020, Milev got her Settlement permit for Switzerland. She lives in St. Gallen and Berlin.

=== Academic degrees and alleged plagiarism ===
In 2008, Milev earned a doctorate with a dissertation in the field of political philosophy, evaluated by Peter Sloterdijk and Elisabeth von Samsonow (2nd reader) and awarded the summa cum laude honor. In 2022, the plagiarism platform VroniPlag Wiki published a report on multiple cases of alleged plagiarism in Milev's dissertation Emergency Empire published in 2009. According to the report, the book plagiarizes articles from the German Wikipedia. In 2010, Milev became visiting research fellow at the Research Institute of the HfG Karlsruhe, and in 2012 was approved to undertake Habilitation with the Seminar for Sociology at the University of St. Gallen (SfS-HSG). In 2014, she received Habilitation with a thesis on the topic of political design sociology, mentored by Franz Schultheis and refereed by Sigrid Schade, Oliver Marchart, and Ulf Wuggenig. In 2023, VroniPlag Wiki published a plagiarism report on her Habilitationsschrift.

In 2016, she held her inaugural lecture (Antrittsvorlesung) as an outside lecturer (Privatdozent) in cultural sociology at the University of St. Gallen, with the title "On Being Precarious in the Society of Symptoms.". At this time, Milev observed that academics socialized in the GDR and born between 1945 and 1975 were excluded from pursuing careers. In 2017 she initiated the research project De-Coupled Society: Liberalization and Resistance in East Germany since 1989/90, which has appeared in multiple volumes with Peter Lang since 2018. To undertake this project, Milev founded the independent platform AGIO | Social Analysis and Political Education.

== Work ==
=== Arts ===
At the end of the 1980s, Milev enacted performances and produced experimental films, visual works, installations, and urban interventions. In the serial multimedia productions on the theme Horror Vacui, such as In Aspik, Einneonopern, Second Up, and Eine Messe, Milev worked in opera-like jam sessions with the musicians Bo Kondren (Ornament & Verbrechen), Paul Landers and Christian Lorenz (both members of Feeling B at the time, and now in Rammstein), André Greiner-Pol (Freygang), Taymur Streng (9 Tage alt), along with the poet Johannes Jansen and the performer Matthias Baader Holst. Films such as raster+psyche and irreversible were accompanied by live sounds, and mounted as concert-like performances in the context of different events, including in such venues as the Dresden Academy of Fine Arts, the Exhibition Center at Fučíkplatz, the House of Young Talents in Berlin (today: Podewil), and the Lindenpark in Potsdam.

In the 1990s, the focus of Milev's work shifted to spatial installations, with the collapse of the Eastern bloc thematized in her serial media installations under the title Exodus (I to VII). Milev continued working with elements of film and projection, and created projected spaces, or Projection Forums, that could be entered. These Projection Forums were featured at the Grand Exhibition Nordrhein-Westfalen in Düsseldorf (1993), in the Leonhardi Museum in Dresden (1995), in the City Museum of Zwickau (1995) and in the Gallery EIGEN + ART in Berlin (1996). In 1997, Milev was invited to documenta X by Catherine David, and presented the interactive spatial installation Projection Forum III in the Ottoneum.

"The displacement of cultural spaces—in particular in Germany after the 1989 transition—is a topic that she also presented in 1997 at Documenta, to which she was invited by Catherine David as the first woman artist from a former Eastern bloc country. She calls the installation shown in the Ottoneum Projection Forum III: hanging from the ceiling, a rotating projector in a black housing casts slides of construction sites on the wall. Through the constant movement, a light frieze emerges as the individual images blend into a sort of film sequence. On the walls—dubbed a "public border" by M[ilev]—the projections remain blurry; only visitors who enter a circle inscribed on the floor—dubbed a "private border"—and hold up a piece of paper, or a scrap of the cardboard provided, receives a sharp, albeit ephemeral image. "The border," runs Milev's thesis, "is a sculpture of transition; social stability is an illusion, constructed and produced with many sacrifices." (Allgemeines Künstlerlexikon Online / Artists of the World Online, De Gruyter, 2020, ISBN 978-3-598-41800-6)

After her long term stay in Japan, she developed new work style on the topic of Resonance Architecture. These new works and spatial installations were presented in numerous galleries and museums: "Zendō Items" at the Kunstraum Munich in 1998; "I submit! For the Resonance!" in the Galley EIGEN + ART in Berlin in 2000; "Resonance Architectur" in the Leopold Hoesch Museum in Düren also in 2000; "Doublewatch" at the Gallery EIGEN + ART in Leipzig in 2001; "In the 4th Dimension" in the Academy of Arts Berlin in 2002, and "In the 4th Dimension" in the Max-Gandolph-Bibliothek in Salzburg, Austria in 2004.

A turning point in Milev's artistic work can be identified in 2005. In labor-intensive studio- or exterior arrangements, scenarios were developed for capture exclusively as photographs. Work clusters emerge such as Body Dwellings, Me Myself & I – Release Your True Image, and The Storytellers Return, all collaborations with the photographer Philipp Beckert. Here too, Milev integrates citations from the martial arts, the Zen-Mondo, or the Japanese expressive dance Butoh, combined with fragments taken from pop culture. These artworks are presented as large-format glossy photographs in the Cloister Altzella (2005), the Octogon Art Hall of the Dresden Academy of Fine Arts (2006), and in the City Museum of Zwickau (2014). They consciously exhibit a proximity to fashion photography.

Other exhibitions by Milev took place in the Grande Halle de la Villette (Paris, 1990), the Museum of Installations (London, 1994), the Venice Biennale (1995), the Ottoneum during documenta X (Kassel, 1997), the Goethe Institute Osaka(1997), the Gallery Fons Welters (Amsterdam, 1997), the MoMA PS1 (New York, 1999), the SCA Gallery Sydney (1999), dem Haus der Kunst München (1998), dem Von der Heydt Museum Wuppertal (1998), dem Fridericianum Kassel (1999), the Museum Folkwang (Essen, 2000), the Kunstmuseum Bonn (2000), the Berlin Academy of Arts (2002), the New National Gallery (Berlin, 2003), the Max Gandoloh Library of Salzburg (2003), the Museum der bildenden Künste Leipzig (2006), the Kunsthalle Mannheim (2011), the Martin-Gropius-Bau, Berlin (2016), the Leopold Hoesch Museum Düren (2016), as well as other venues.

Currently, Milev is listed among the Global Top 100,000 in the ranking at ArtFacts.net. Her highest placement in the art-market ranking was in the Global Top 1,000 in 2000.

=== Artistic research ===
In 1987, the AOBBME project began to wind itself through Milev's creative works as a red thread. The Association of Black Box Multiple Environments is based on the philosophy of the black box, invisibility and impenetrability. For Milev, the black box is an identity-construct that develops itself in the realm of the individual "microtopos" and retreats before the external world in response to a social intervention, a devaluation, or a stigmatization. In 1994, the AOBBME is incorporated in Berlin, as the Institute for Applied Spatial Research and Microtopic Cultural Production.

"In 1994, in Berlin, she founds the one-person institute A.O.B.B.M.E. (Association of Black Box Multiple Environments), also known as the Institute for Applied Spatial Research and Microtopic Cultural Production: a project she had already begun in 1987 as a self-reflection and individual self-positioning by an artist not only on the art market, but in the social system as such. In continual shifts between roles and media, she reflects the biographical arena in its cultural counterpart; she herself understands these changes of position as a self-initiated, performative act of cultural adaptation." (Allgemeines Künstlerlexikon Online / Artists of the World Online, De Gruyter, 2020, ISBN 978-3-598-41800-6)

The focus of this research is the thematization of the body as an archive of cultural inscription, and the formulation of techniques of the self. Milev names these techniques of the self a "living archaeology," and "de-urbanization." Numerous publications and a significant reception greeted these works by Milev. As early as the beginning of the 1990s, Milev articulates a demand for Artistic research as a condition of artistic production. A further transformational phase of Milev's artistic research occurs during her ethnographic studies and training in the martial arts of Kyudō und Aikidō in Japan. Milev calls this phase "Nippon Base Training." She develops the concept of Resonance Architectur as a characteristic found not only in the traditional martial arts (Budō) but in the traditional way of the arts (Geidō). The AOBBME institute is incorporated at this time as an Institute for Applied Resonance Research in Kyōto. In the discipline of Kata (stylized or choreographed movement sequences) and in the philosophy of Maai (distance), Milev discerns the key to a complementary ordering of perception. The methods of "kinaesthetic spatial production" extend the AOBBME project's ambit to include the thesis of the "crisis as a permanent spatial dimension."

Since 2018, the AOBBME is managed as an online archive of Milev's works and as a trademarked brand. For Milev, artistic research remains a scientific arrangement in which ethnographic, artistic, therapeutic or curatorial methods get knowledge and space production its starting point. On the basis of this principle, Milev continually defines the character of her current projects anew.

=== Cultural studies and social sciences ===
Milev's dissertation in Political philosophy on the State of exception and Sovereignty was published as her first scholarly monograph by Springer (Vienna, New York) with the title Emergency Empire — Transformations of the State of Exception (Part I: Sovereignty) in 2009.

In 2004, Milev began expanding her field of research to include design research. At the Zurich University of the Arts (ZHdK) in 2005, she founded Emergency Design, a research discourse thematizing the political, social, spatial, and aesthetic dimensions of survival. In Emergency Design, a new theoretical instrument for the diagnosis of social upheavals emerges from the connections Milev draws between, on the one hand, concepts in political philosophy such as the state of exception, the state of war, or the emergency as a cultural catastrophe, as a zone of anomie; and on the other, designing as a praxeological and sociospatial concept of action. The basis for Milev's discourse on Emergency Design lies in her experiences with the collapse of the GDR and the Eastern Bloc and the subsequent upheavals of the early 1990s.

"By connecting Milev's films of the 1980s to her theoretical work of the 2010s, we can see how she limned the duality of social design at a moment when a particular anthropotechnic formation - that of East German socialism - was still in place and could therefore be committed to film, but had begun to fail. [...] Integrating her own performance practice into her work with film, she connected her embodied exploration of the foams, forces, and functions of space to a broader exploration already afoot, inscribing an individual practice into the social design she had rendered legible in moving images. In this way, her intermedial work and its filmic derivate become understandable as working documents of applied spatial research – and therefore as advancing an intellectual program that is of a piece with the theoretical sociology." (Seth Howes, Film Experiments, Design Anthropology, and the Politics of Vision: Yana Milev's Theory of Practice, in: Id., Moving Images on the Margins. Experimental Film in the Late Socialist East Germany, Camden House, NY, USA, 2019, pp.171-172, ISBN 1-64014-068-9)

With the English-language anthology D.A. – A Transdisciplinary Handbook of Design Anthropology, published in 2013 by the international scholarly publisher Peter Lang, Milev formulates a complementary scholarly basis for design research. The concept of "anthropology" is used by Milev in its American sense as a superordinated concept of humanistic inquiry. Accordingly, the design anthropology is conceived by Milev as a complementary science of design in the field of the cultural studies, social sciences and politics. The anthology is organized in five books and eleven clusters: Book 1: Design Cultures, Book 2: Design Philosophy, Book 3: Design Sociology, Book 4: Design Embodiment, and Book 5: Design Intervention. More than 100 notable experts participate in the project. Milev's work on a complementary science of design is widely reviewed and integrated in seminar curricula.

From this larger work, Book 3 with its four clusters (Design Politics, Design Governance, Design Sociology, and Design Ethnology) was extracted and published in a German-language edition entitled Designsoziologie. Der erweiterte Designbegriff im Entwurfsfeld der politischen Theorie und Soziologie. Milev submitted this Design Sociology as a habilitation thesis at the University of St. Gallen.

In the continuation of her scholarly activity as research associate of the Seminar for Sociology at the University of St. Gallen (SfS-HSG), Milev further develops the themes of the precaritization and symbolic violence of neoliberal regimes. She researches design governance as an element of global governance and examines the function of media and marketing in hegemonial assertions of corporate interests. In this context, she connects the critique of globalization to a critique of violence and a critique of the "creative economy." Milev furthermore analyzes the pathogenic effects of coordinated brand movements in the social fields, as well as social-ethical disorientation, deprivation, and associated comorbidities. A public-facing high point of this research is her lecture at the scholarly symposium "Experiencing Atmospheres: Dimensions of a Diffuse Phenomenon," held at the ZKM in 2011 and her written contribution to the Handbook of Fear published by J.B. Metzler in 2013. Additional publications appear on the topic of Being Precarious in the Society of Symptoms.

Since 2017, Milev's research focuses on the subordination of, and discrimination against, individuals socialized in the GDR after the state accession in 1990; on precarity and anomie in the federal states belonging to the former East; on the east–west conflict in unified Germany; and on the normative populism of the ruling market-liberal democracy. She has founded the research project De-Coupled Society: Liberalization and Resistance in East Germany since 1989/90: A Sociological Laboratory. This comprises an edition of multiple volumes with the titles Annexation, Reorganization, Exile, Surveys over social facts, Testimonies in Photography & Film, Spaces, Scenes, and Which Future? With the trilogy of monographs Annexation, Reorganization, Exile (Anschluss, Umbau, Exil), Milev develops across 1,430 pages a grounded theory of the so-called German-German "re-unification" in the context of the eastward expansion of NATO and the EU, and analyzes the social consequences of the politics of annexation and assimilation in the post-GDR.

Alongside this research publication, additional analytic books such as Democracy defects and The Treuhand Trauma are published to make the topic accessible to a broader public and for debate. Milev decidedly distances herself from prevailing perceptions by describing the "Unification Agreement" (Einigungsvertrag) as an "Expropriation Agreement" (Ent-Eignungsvertrag), interpreting the Volkskammer's 1990 Accession Resolution (Beitritssbeschluss) as an "Enabling Act" (Ermächtigungsgesetz), the "Reconstruction of the East" (Aufbau Ost) as an "execution maneuver" (Vollstreckungsfeldzug), and the "first free election of the Volkskammer" as a campaign coordinated from Bonn. Milev's research on "re-unification" has been widely received and challenged. It has also been acknowledged as an innovative contribution in scholarly discussion of Korea, and in anthropology and European cultural studies.

=== Curating arts and sciences ===
For Milev, curating is in the first instance a process of contextualized compression and transmission of complex and current topics. Here, she combines scholarship, experimental media arrangements, ethnographic field research, and scenographic presentations in curated, multiple environments.

Milev's first roles in context-oriented project leadership were undertaken between 1988 and 1991 at the Dresden Academy of Fine Arts and in the Black Box Multiple studio in Dresden-Nord.

Additional curatorial projects followed in the Leonhardi Museum (Dresden, 1995); the Goethe Institute Osaka (1997), and the Gallery EIGEN + ART (Leipzig, 2001). In the context of her exhibitions, she mounted interdisciplinary workshops, so-called AOBBME Ambulances, with audience members and guests.

With the international symposium "Emergency Design," which took place as a festival and conference at the Zurich University of the Arts (ZHdK) in 2006, Milev established her specific profile as a curator. With interdisciplinary conference panels, a film program, interior and exterior scenarios, event zones spread across the entire Academy campus, as well as more than 60 participants of international standing, Milev organized a three-day cultural scenario with her team.

At the University of Design Karlsruhe (HfG), curatorial programs and platforms including talk(ing) space (2006) and Guerilla Transit (2007) were developed. The panel series talks in-between emergencies (originally conceived in 2008) took place in 2009 in cooperation with the ZKM Karlsruhe.

In 2011, Milev served a program coordination advisor with Cordula Hamschmidt for the event "Über Wut / On Rage" at the Haus der Kulturen der Welt in Berlin. The same year, Milev and the musician and photographer Philipp Beckert founded the label NUXN, a platform for photography and visual sociology.

Milev's foundational work in the burgeoning field of design anthropology, D.A. — A Transdisciplinary Handbook of Design Anthropology, is at the same time a foundational work in expanded design curating. In cooperation with Mind Design, this work was adapted as an exhibition entitled "The Next Big Thing is Not a Thing", in the Institute for Architecture and Design "Bureau Europa" (Maastricht). The same year, Milev presented a sketch of applied crisis-economics in the Anthropocene during the epilogue of the GLOBALE, held at the ZKM Karlsruhe on the topic "Next Society — Facing Gaia."

=== Teaching projects ===
Between 2000 and 2015, Milev worked continuously as an instructor with teaching responsibilities at the Weißensee Academy of Art Berlin (KHB), the Berlin University of the Arts (UDK), the University of Salzburg, the Salzburg University of Applied Sciences, the University of Design Karlsruhe (HfG), the Zurich University of the Arts (ZHdK), and the School of Humanities and Social Sciences at the University of St. Gallen (SHSS-HSG). In this context, her activities at the Academy of Design in Karlsruhe played a central part between 2003 and 2012. During this time, Milev developed new seminar formats such as the methods seminar Critical Theory — Theory Design, the seminar Crisis Economies: New Exchange Forms in the Zones of Anomie, and the practical format Guerilla Transit: Spot Actings in the Zones of Anomie. Between 2011 and 2015, these were accompanied by seminars in the contextual studies sequence at the School of Humanities and Social Sciences at the University of St. Gallen, on the topic of Design Governance, in addition to the seminar at the Berlin University of the Arts entitled Politics of Self-Design.

== Political positions ==
In the 2000s, Milev developed a pointed critique of the global art industry, and of a neoliberal creative economy that increasingly infiltrates all social spheres and destroys the social sense of art, speech, and exchange through coordinated brand movements and mainstreamings. Her exit from the global art market was a considered political stance.

For Milev, the annexation of the GDR by the FRG is a model of regime change as this has been practiced, according to the US example, throughout the world since 1973. According to Milev, the paradigm "freedom and capitalism," as propagated by the US economist Milton Friedman, now also thoroughly rules the erstwhile "Eastern bloc." At the outset of her research project De-Coupled Society, Milev released the following statement:

My critique of the system did not end with the end of the GDR; instead, with the so-called "re-unification" — it was assigned a new task! The will for reform felt by the majority of the GDR population in 1989/90, with its goal of a grassroots-democratic, confederalist constitutional solution, was forced to give way to an annexation whose consequences damaged the rights and values of many millions of people. Democratic liberalism manifests itself as an unfettered project of new land-grabs, and the dissolution of spheres of life, work, and culture without an alternative. (Michael Meyen, Der Think Tank Yana Milev, Das mediale Erbe der DDR, URL: https://medienerbe.hypotheses.org/2459)

In protest against the erasure in international law of her country of origin, the GDR, and her involuntary inclusion as a citizen of the Federal Republic of Germany, in 2000 Milev declared Switzerland her place of exile from political and territorial homelessness.

== Exhibitions (selection) ==
- 1990: "L'autre Allemagne hors les murs". La grande halle de la Villette, Paris, F
- 1990: AVE-Media-Festival, Arnhem, NL
- 1992: "4 aspekte zu exodus". Galerie EIGEN + ART, Leipzig
- 1993: "exodus=asyl+analyse". Galerie EIGEN + ART, Berlin
- 1994: Galerie EIGEN + ART in London, Independent Art Space, Museum of Installations, London, UK
- 1995: "Club Berlin". kuratiert von Klaus Biesenbach, Biennale, Venedig, I
- 1996: "exercitium 1.01.-schweigen im reigen". Rauminstallation Leonhardi-Museum, Dresden
- 1997: documenta X, Ottoneum, Kassel, kuratiert von Catherine David (erste Teilnehmer aus den ehemaligen Ostblock-Ländern)
- 1997: "AOBBME – de-urban ambulance". Goethe-Institut Osaka, JP
- 1997: "URBAN LIVING". Galerie "Fons Welters", Amsterdam, NL
- 1999: "Go East". SCA Gallery, Sydney, AUS
- 1999: "Talk. Show". Von der Heydt-Museum Wuppertal, kuratiert von S.M.-Büsser und B. Schwenk
- 1999: "Children of Berlin". MoMA PS1, kuratiert von Klaus Biesenbach, New York, USA
- 2000: "Floating Cities". kuratiert von Nina Muecke und Angelika Sommer, Haus der Kulturen der Welt, Berlin
- 2001: "doublewatch". Galerie EIGEN + ART, Leipzig
- 2003: "Rituale". kuratiert von N. Muecke und A. Sommer, Akademie der Künste, Berlin
- 2005: "the storytellers return: romantica und cella". kuratiert von Volkmar Billig, Kloster Altzella, Nossen
- 2006: "Kultur-Invest-Dresden". Die Dresdner Bank im Oktogon, kuratiert von Susanne Greinke, Hochschule der Bildenden Künste Dresden
- 2006: "revision ddr/40 jahre videokunst.de". kuratiert von Dieter Daniels und Jeannette Stoschek, Museum der Bildenden Künste Leipzig
- 2007: Transmediale, Akademie der Künste, Berlin
- 2009: "Ohne uns! Kunst und alternative Kultur in Dresden vor und nach' 89", kuratiert von Frank Eckart, Paul Kaiser und Susanne Altmann, Dresden
- 2010: "Puzzle", kuratiert von Julia Schäfer und Angelika Richter, Galerie für Zeitgenössische Kunst Leipzig
- 2011: "Hab ich Euch nicht blendend amüsiert? Weibliche Subversionen in der späten DDR", kuratiert von Susanne Altmann, Kunsthalle Mannheim
- 2014: "Wir werden 100", anl. der Eröffnung des Max-Pechstein-Museums, Kunstsammlung Zwickau, Max-Pechstein-Museum Zwickau
- 2016: "Gegenstimmen", kuratiert von Christoph Tannert und Eugen Blume, Martin Gropius Bau Berlin

== Films ==
- Raster + Psyche, Super-8-Film, 3-teilig, s/w und Farbe, 30 Minuten, Remake Digibeta/VHS, 1997, Verleih: Ex.Oriente.Lux
- Doublage Fantastique, Super-8-Film, Doppelprojektion, s/w und Farbe (1988), 30 Minuten, zusammen mit Via Lewandowsky (1989), Remake Digibeta/VHS, 1997, Verleih: Ex.Oriente.Lux
- Irreversible, Super-8-Mehrfachprojektion, s/w und Farbe, 40 Minuten, Life-Aufführung (1989), Remake Digibeta/VHS, 1997, Verleih: Ex.Oriente.Lux
- Exodus: Auszug ins Gelobte Land oder Wer sind wir in diesem Augenblick der Geschichte?, Ein Rundgang (1992), Verleih: AOBBME-Archiv
- I submit! – Für die Resonanz, Doku über den Weg des Bogens, Produktion: Majade Filmproduktions GmbH Berlin/Leipzig, 90 Minuten (Produktionsabbruch), Trailer (2003), MiniDV, Digibeta, Verleih: AOBBME-Archiv

== Public collections (selection) ==
- Staatsministerium für Wissenschaft und Kunst, Dresden (1995)
- Kupferstichkabinett, Dresden (1995)
- Kupferstichkabinett, Berlin (1995)
- Städtisches Museum, Zwickau (1996)
- Sachsen LB, Leipzig (1997)
- Sachsen LB, Leipzig (2001)
- Sächsisches Staatsministerium für Wissenschaft und Kunst (2004)
- Sächsische Kunstsammlung Dresden/Kunstfonds Dresden (2003)
- Sächsische Kunstsammlung Dresden/Kunstfonds Dresden (2005)
- Städtisches Museum Zwickau (2014)

== Dealer ==
- Galerie EIGEN+ART Leipzig/Berlin (1992–2003)

== Curatorial projects (selection) ==
- 1994: AOBBME (Association Of Black Box Multiple Environments), seit 1994 „Institut für Angewandte Raumforschung und Mikrotopische Kulturproduktion" mit Sitz in Berlin (http://www.aobbme.com/)
- 1995: "Wie kann das Nichts erfahrbar sein?" kuratorisches Programm über 40 Tage im Rahmen der Ausstellung "Schweigen im Reigen", Leonhardi-Museum Dresden
- 2005: TALK IN(G) SPACE: Interviews mit Lehrenden und Studierenden der Hochschule für Gestaltung Karlsruhe zu Fragen des relationalen Raumes, in Kooperation mit Mischa Kuball, Andrei Ujica, Kathrin Wildner, Marc Teuscher, Jesus Muñoz, Max Mayer, Oliver Karl Boeg u. a.
- 2006: "Emergency Design", Festival und Konferenz an der ZHdK in Zürich (http://emergencydesign.zhdk.ch/)
- 2006: "Replay-Emergency Design", Konferenz an der HfG Karlsruhe (http://www.aobbme.com/wordpress/wp-content/uploads/replay-ED-2.pdf)
- 2007: "Guerilla Transit", aktivistische Plattform mit Studierenden der HfG Karlsruhe (http://www.guerilla-transit.de/)
- 2009: "talks in-between emergencies" (http://on1.zkm.de/zkm/stories/storyReader$6478)
- 2010: ON RAGE, kuratorische Beratung für Cordula Hamschmidt im Rahmen des Projektes „On Rage" Haus der Kulturen der Welt, Berlin (https://www.hkw.de/en/programm/projekte/2010/ueber_wut/veranstaltungen_40673/AlleVeranstaltungen.php)
- 2011: NUXN, Plattform für Fotografie und Visuelle Anthropologie (http://www.nuxn.de/)
- 2013: DESIGN ANTHROPOLOGY, The Theoretical And Curatorial Foundation For An Extended Concept Of Design (http://design-anthropology.eu/)
- 2016: The Next Big Thing is Not a Thing, Ausstellungskonzeption nach dem Buch "D.A. - A Transdisciplinary Handbook of Design Anthropology" und Co-Kuratierung, Bureau Europa, Maastricht (https://www.bureau-europa.nl/en/the-next-big-thing-is-not-a-thing/)
- 2016: Next Society - Facing Gaia. Epilog GLOBALE, ZKM (http://zkm.de/media/video/next-society-facing-gaia-yana-milev)

== Books ==
=== Monographs ===
- Von Exodus bis Exercitium. Lebendige Archäologie und Theoriedesign als Methoden künstlerischer Forschung. Edition EIGEN + ART, Leipzig/Berlin 1995, 176 Seiten, ISBN 3-929294-15-X
- Emergency Empire – Teil 1: Souveränität. Transformation des Ausnahmezustands. Springer, Wien/ New York 2009, 239 Seiten, ISBN 978-3-211-79811-9
- Emergency Design – Anthropotechniken des Über/Lebens, Eine kulturanthropologische Perspektive. Merve Verlag, Berlin 2011, 119 Seiten, ISBN 978-3-88396-300-6
- Designsoziologie. Der erweiterte Designbegriff im Entwurfsfeld der politischen Theorie und Soziologie. Peter Lang Academic Publishers, Bern/ Brüssel/ Berlin/ Wien/Oxford/New York 2014, 819 Seiten, ISBN 978-3-631-65670-9
- Entkoppelte Gesellschaft - Ostdeutschland seit 1989/90. Anschluss. Peter Lang, Internationaler Verlag der Wissenschaften, Berlin 2018, 343 Seiten, ISBN 978-3-631-77155-6
- Demokratiedefekte. Ein Essay zum normativen Populismus, Agenda Verlag, Münster 2019, 114 Seiten, ISBN 978-3-89688-624-8.
- Das Treuhand-Trauma : Die Spätfolgen der Übernahme, Das Neue Berlin, Berlin 2020, 287 Seiten, ISBN 978-3-360-01359-0
- Entkoppelte Gesellschaft - Ostdeutschland seit 1989/90. Umbau. Peter Lang, Internationaler Verlag der Wissenschaften, Berlin 2019, 493 Seiten, ISBN 978-3-631-77155-6
- Entkoppelte Gesellschaft - Ostdeutschland seit 1989/90. Exil. Peter Lang, Internationaler Verlag der Wissenschaften, Berlin 2020, 593 Seiten, ISBN 978-3-631-77155-6

=== Editions ===
- Emergency Design. Designstrategien im Arbeitsfeld der Krise. Verlag Springer, Wien/ New York 2008, (zus. mit Gerhard Blechinger), 171 Seiten, ISBN 978-3-211-48760-0
- D.A. - A Transdisciplinary Handbook of Design Anthropology. Peter Lang Verlag, Bern/ Brüssel/ Berlin/ Wien/ Oxford/ New York 2013, 1.300 Seiten, ISBN 978-3-631-61906-3
- Design Kulturen. Der Erweiterte Designbegriff im Entwurfsfeld der Kulturwissenschaft. HFG Forschung, Fink, München 2013, 319 Seiten, ISBN 978-3-7705-5534-5
- Europa im freien Fall. Orientierung in einem neuen Kalten Krieg. Turia+Kant, Wien/ Berlin 2016, 143 Seiten, ISBN 978-3-85132-822-6
- Entkoppelte Gesellschaft - Ostdeutschland seit 1989/90. Tatbestände. Peter Lang, Internationaler Verlag der Wissenschaften, Berlin 2019, 569 Seiten, (zus. mit Franz Schultheis), ISBN 978-3-631-78731-1
- Entkoppelte Gesellschaft – Ostdeutschland seit 1989/90. Zeugnisse/Fotografie. Peter Lang, Internationaler Verlag der Wissenschaften, Berlin 2021, (zus. mit Philipp Beckert und Marcel Noack), 689 Seiten, ISBN 978-3-631-81991-3

== Bibliography (selection) ==
- Claus Löser: Gegenbilder – Filmische Subversion in der DDR 1976–1989. Janus Press, 1996 1996, ISBN 3-928942-38-7.
- Johannes Kirschenmann: Konstruktionen auf der Baustelle des Subjekts. Überlegungen zur documenta-Arbeit von Yana Milev. In: Bernhard Balkenhol, Heiner Georgsdorf (Hrsg.): X mal documenta X. Über Kunst und Künstler der Gegenwart. Ein Nachlesebuch zur 10. documenta. University Press Kunsthochschule Universität Kassel, Kassel 1997, ISBN 3-88122-963-9.
- bohème und diktatur in der ddr. Katalog zur gleichen Ausstellung im Marstall, Berlin, Fannei & Walz-Verlag, Deutsches Historisches Museum, Berlin 1997, ISBN 3-927574-39-2.
- Politics/Poetics. Das Buch zur documenta X, Werner Stehr, Johannes Kirschenmann (Hrsg.), Hatje Cantz Verlag, 1997, ISBN 3-89322-909-4.
- "short guide" Kunstführer documenta X, Cantz Verlag, 1997, ISBN 3-89322-938-8.
- Eckart Gillen (Hrsg.): Deutschlandbilder. Kunst aus einem geteilten Land. Katalog zur gleichen Ausstellung Martin-Gropius-Bau, Berlin. DuMont Verlag, 1997, ISBN 3-7701-3869-4.
- Susanne Meyer-Büser: Yana Milev. Begriffs-Environment als Gesamtkunstwerk. In: Talk Show. Die Kunst der Kommunikation. Hatje Cantz, Ostfildern 1999, ISBN 3-7913-2066-1.
- Zelle 05: Kreuzungen. Ausstellungskatalog, Volkmar Billig (Hrsg.), Verlag&Druckerei Tierbs, Pirna 2005.
- Susanne Greinke (Hrsg.): Kulturinvest Dresden. Verlag für Moderne Kunst Nürnberg, Kulturstiftung Dresden der Dresdner Bank, 2006, ISBN 3-939738-03-4.
- Dieter Daniels, Jeannette Stoschek (Hrsg.): Grauzone 8mm. Materialien zum autonomen Künstlerfilm in der DDR, Materialband zur Ausstellung 40 jahrevideokunst.de:revision.ddr. Museum der bildenden Künste Leipzig mit DVD produziert vom Ludwig Boltzmann Institut Medien.Kunst.Forschung. Gefördert von der Kulturstiftung des Bundes. Hatje Cantz, Ostfildern 2007, ISBN 978-3-7757-1955-1.
- Christoph Tannert: Intermedia. Weiblicherseits. In: Angelika Richter, Beatrice E. Stammer, Bettina Knaup (Hrsg.): und jetzt. Künstlerinnen aus der DDR. Verlag für moderne Kunst Nürnberg, Nürnberg 2009, ISBN 978-3-941185-73-9.
- Susanne Altmann: Hab ich Euch nicht blendend amüsiert? Weibliche Subversion in der späten DDR. In: Projektgruppe OHNE UNS!, Ohne Uns! Kunst und alternative Kultur in Dresden vor und nach '89.EFAU-Verlag, Dresden, 2010, ISBN 978-3-9807388-1-1.
- Claus Löser: Strategien der Verweigerung. Untersuchungen zum politisch-ästhetischen Gestus unangepasster filmischer Artikulation in der Spätphase der DDR. DEFA-Stiftung, Berlin 2011, ISBN 978-3-00-034845-7.
- Susanne Altmann, Ulrike Lorenz (Hrsg.): Entdeckt. Rebellische Künstlerinnen in der DDR. Kunsthalle Mannheim, 2011, ISBN 978-3-89165-221-3.
- Rebecca Riedel, Mieke Ulfig, Matthias Einhoff, Superschools Geschichtsbuch. Eine Übertragung des szenischen Vortrags Krisenökonomien von Yana Milev, aufgeführt im Maxim-Gorki-Theater Berlin, Studiobühne, 12 June 2010, in: Matthias Götz, Maike Fraas (Hg.), Fiasco - ma non troppo. Vom Designfehler zum Fehlerdesign, Schwabe Verlag, Basel, 2012, S. 284–311, ISBN 978-3-7965-3419-5.
- Claudia Mareis, Theorien des Designs. Zur Einführung, Junius, Hamburg, 2014, ISBN 978-3-88506-086-4.
- Elize Bisanz, Marlene Heidel (Hg.), Bildgespenster. Künstlerische Archive aus der DDR und ihre Rolle heute, Transcript, Bielefeld, 2014, ISBN 978-3-8376-2461-8.
- Angelika Richter, Das Gesetz der Szene: Genderkritik, Performance Art und zweite Öffentlichkeit in der späten DDR (Studien zur visuellen Kultur), transcript Verlag, Bielefeld 2019, ISBN 978-3-8394-4572-3.
- Seth Howes, Moving Images on the Margins – Experimental Film in Late Socialist East Germany, Boydell & Brewer Ltd, NY USA, 2019, ISBN 978-1-64014-068-4.
- Ronald Galenza, Die Hosen haben Röcke an. Female Voices der DDR Subkultur, in: Alexander Pehlemann, Ronald Galenza, Robert Mießner (Hg.), MAGNETIZDAT DDR. Magnetbanduntergrund Ost 1979–1990, Verbrecher Verlag, Berlin, 2021, ISBN 9783957324764.
- Stephanie Jaeckel: Milev, Yana: Allgemeines Künstlerlexikon Online / Artists of the World Online, edited by Wolf Tegethoff, Bénédicte Savoy and Andreas Beyer, De Gruyter, Berlin, New York: K. G. Saur, 2009, https://www.degruyter.com/database/AKL/entry/_42000319/html. Accessed 2021-10-21.

== Awards ==
- 1993–1995: Graduiertenförderung des Landes Sachsen
- 1994: Arbeitsstipendium, Stiftung Kulturfonds der neuen Bundesländer, Berlin
- 1995: Max-Pechstein-Preis (Förderpreis)
- 1996–1998: Förderstipendium der Günther-Peill-Stiftung, Düren
- 1997–1999: DAAD-Stipendium für Japan
