= PlagScan =

Plagiarism detection software

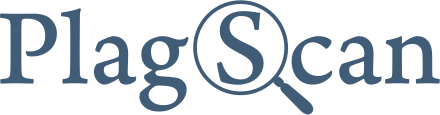
- Developer(s): PlagScan GmbH
- Platform: Internet
- Available in: English, French, Spanish, German
- Website: plagscan.com

PlagScan is a plagiarism detection software, mostly used by academic institutions. PlagScan compares submissions with web documents, journals and internal archives. The software was launched in 2009 by Markus Goldbach and Johannes Knabe of Cologne, Germany.

In 2019/2020, PlagScan merged with a similar Swedish company, Urkund, to form the company Ouriginal, owned by private equity firm Procuritas. Commenters suggested this might provide competition for leading plagiarism detection company, Turnitin. In March 2021, Turnitin announced its intent to purchase Ouriginal. The Australian Competition & Consumer Commission considered opposing the acquisition, but ultimately decided against it. The acquisition was completed in November 2021.

== Functionality ==
PlagScan is offered as a Software as a Service and as an on-premise solution. Users can either register as a single user or as an organization. Upon first-time registration, single users receive a free test credit and can purchase additional credits for future submissions, after the completion of a satisfactory trial.

Organizational users verify the organization's address prior to using the software. An obligation-free quote can be requested immediately on the website. Organizations can choose from a variety of options and create multiple administrators and groups, for example, to divide different departments within one institution.

After scanning a submission for plagiarism, PlagScan provides users with a detailed report that indicates potential plagiarism and lists the matched sources.

== Markets ==
PlagScan serves schools and universities worldwide. The software aims to help academic institutions to increase students’ awareness toward plagiarism and academic integrity.

PlagScan also offers its services to the commercial market and publishers. Business users employ the software to improve SEO rankings or secure the proper usage of copyright material. They mostly aim to ensure unique content and its protection. The most common commercial customers are publishers, journalists, advertising agencies and law firms.

By 2018, PlagScan served more than 1,500,000 single users and over 1,500 organizations such as the University of Zürich, University of Jordan, Auburn University and the Ministry of Education (Austria). Annually, PlagScan checks several million documents for plagiarism.

== Privacy and data security ==
PlagScan is compliant to the European General Data Protection Regulation or GDPR, particularly following the German Bundesdatenschutzgesetz (BDSG), data security and copyright regulations. Each user has a variety of options regarding their data and submission settings, for example, whether to keep, delete or include submissions in an internal archive. According to the European data security and privacy laws.

== Technology ==
PlagScan's two-step algorithm was developed in 2008, and compares submissions with millions of web sources and internal archives that users can optionally participate in. The software recognizes plagiarism as soon as at least three consecutive words match a different source.

PlagScan built an indexing tool based on Apache Solr and relies on Microsoft Bing’s search index for web documents.

The software can be integrated into Learning Management Systems such as Moodle, Canvas, Schoology, etc through an API and LTI integration.

== Reviews ==
The plagiarism blog plagiarismtoday.com ranked PlagScan as the fourth-best plagiarism detection software on the market in 2011.

PlagScan participated in "Captivate", a three-month acceleration program by the German Accelerator in 2014, promoting German technology startups to enter the U.S. market.

PlagScan was ranked as one of the best information and communication technologies at the European Venture Summit in 2014.

== Spotlight on Spanish Media, Congress and Senate ==
PlagScan came under the spotlight in Spain in September 2018 and created a lot of social debate, having even been discussed in Spanish Congress Of Deputies and Senate, after the Spanish Government used it to check alleged plagiarism on Spanish President Pedro Sanchez's Doctoral Thesis.

The program allegedly reported a 0.96% match when run by the Spanish Government, however those figures were later corrected by PlagScan CEO, Markus Goldbach to be 21% with the default configuration. Rival software TurnItIn had reported a rate of plagiarism of 15%, several times more than that reported by Spanish Government using PlagScan.

The company replied "After applying the software internally – using the default settings and no filters – PlagScan cannot confirm this number. An initial scan revealed 21 percent of duplicated content. In order to receive a 0.96 percent result, one must have applied specific settings and actively disqualified sources. PlagScan has reached out to the Moncloa in order to gain an insight on the government’s procedure and methodology."

This is an ongoing controversy and different newspapers, depending on their political bias, defend one result or the other.

== See also ==
- Plagiarism
- Comparison of anti-plagiarism software
