= Kira Talent =

Canadian software company

- Industry: Education technology
- Founded: 2012
- Founder: Emilie Cushman; Konrad Listwan
- Headquarters: Toronto
- Website: www.kiratalent.com

Kira Talent is a Canadian education technology company headquartered in Toronto. It is an online video platform used by universities for admissions interviews.

== History ==
Kira Talent was founded in 2012 by Emilie Cushman and Konrad Listwan. It was named the Most Outstanding Venture among the Next 36 entrepreneurial initiative participants of 2012. As of 2016, Kira Talent had raised $8 million in funding. In 2019, Cushman, was named to the Forbes 30 Under 30 for Education.

Kira Talent’s cloud-based applicant assessment platform was introduced as an alternative to in-person and phone interviews. The interviewer records their questions over video and sends them over to candidates with an established deadline. After viewing each question, an interviewee has an allotted amount of time to consider the query, after which the webcam turns on and they have a limited amount of time to record a response. After applicants have responded the reviewers can log-in to see, rank, share, and compare the results.

In 2019, Kira Talent partnered with Turnitin to offer a plagiarism checker for college admissions.

Kira Talent maintains a higher education blog and online newsletter, The Admissions Roundup, on higher education admissions and recruitment.
