= Martin Luther King Jr. authorship issues =

Disputes over authorship of works by Martin Luther King Jr.

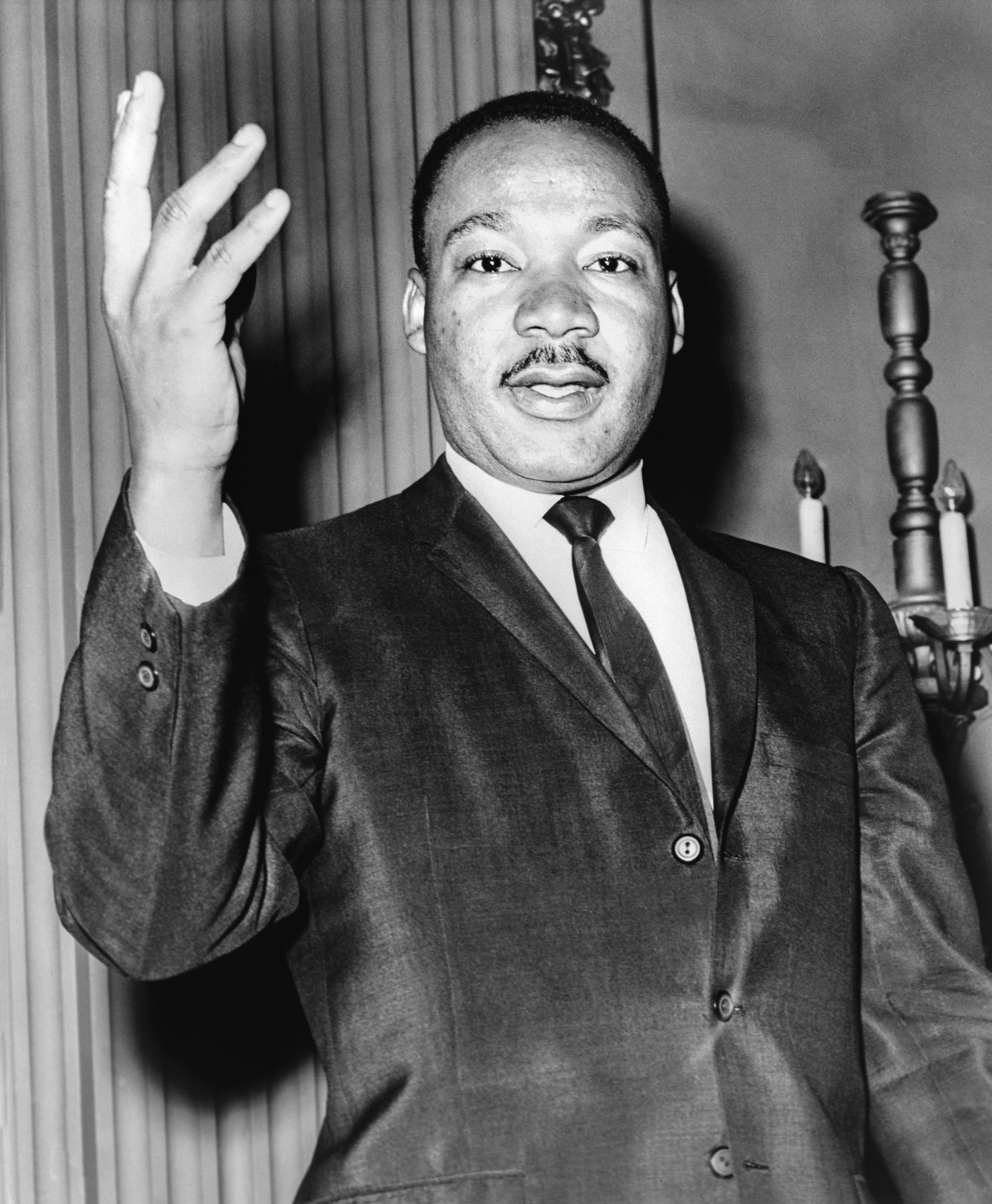
King in 1964

Authorship issues concerning Martin Luther King Jr. fall into two general categories: Plagiarism in King's academic research papers (including his doctoral dissertation) and his use of borrowed phrases in speeches.

== Dissertation and other academic papers ==
Martin Luther King Jr.'s papers were donated by his wife Coretta Scott King to Stanford University's King Papers Project. During the late 1980s, as the papers were being organized and catalogued, the staff of the project discovered that King's doctoral dissertation at Boston University, titled A Comparison of the Conception of God in the Thinking of Paul Tillich and Henry Nelson Wieman, included large sections from a dissertation written by another student (Jack Boozer) three years earlier at Boston University.

As Clayborne Carson, director of the King Papers Project at Stanford University, has written, "instances of textual appropriation can be seen in his earliest extant writings as well as his dissertation. The pattern is also noticeable in his speeches and sermons throughout his career."

Boston University, where King received his Ph.D. in systematic theology, conducted an investigation that found he appropriated and plagiarized major portions of his doctoral thesis from various other authors who wrote about the topic.

According to civil rights historian Ralph Luker, who worked on the King Papers Project directing the research on King's early life, King's paper The Chief Characteristics and Doctrines of Mahayana Buddhism was taken almost entirely from secondary sources. He writes:

Moreover, the farther King went in his academic career, the more deeply ingrained the patterns of borrowing language without clear attribution became. Thus, the plagiarism in his dissertation seemed to be, by then, the product of his long established practice.

The incident was first reported in the December 3, 1989, edition of the Sunday Telegraph by Frank Johnson, titled "Martin Luther King—Was He a Plagiarist?" The incident was then reported in U.S. in the November 9, 1990, edition of the Wall Street Journal, under the title of "To Their Dismay, King Scholars Find a Troubling Pattern". Several other newspapers then followed with stories, including the Boston Globe and the New York Times. Although Carson believed King had acted unintentionally, he also stated that King had been sufficiently well acquainted with academic principles and procedures to have understood the need for extensive footnotes, and he was at a loss to explain why King had not used them.

Boston University decided not to revoke his doctorate, saying that although King acted improperly, his dissertation still "makes an intelligent contribution to scholarship." The committee also dismissed allegations that King plagiarized writings which he used to develop his organization and chapter headings. However, a letter is now attached to King's dissertation in the university library, noting that numerous passages were included without the appropriate quotations and citations of sources.

Ralph Luker questioned whether King's professors at the Crozer Theological Seminary held him to lower standards because he was Black, citing as evidence the fact that King received lower marks (a C+ average) at the historically black Morehouse College than at Crozer, where he was a minority being graded mostly by white teachers and received an A− average. Boston University has denied that King received any special treatment. Prof. S. Paul Schilling, the only survivor of the two faculty members who reviewed King’s work in 1956, rejected the allegation that King was given any special treatment. Schilling said his own lack of experience at the time may have allowed “shoddy scholarship” to go undetected. He additionally claimed that King's mistakes may be attributed to the fact he was an extremely busy pastor of a Baptist church while writing the thesis.

The Martin Luther King Jr. Papers Project addresses authorship issues on pp. 25–26 of Volume II of The Papers of Martin Luther King Jr., entitled "Rediscovering Precious Values, July 1951 – November 1955", Clayborne Carson, senior editor. Following is an excerpt from these pages:

The readers of King's dissertation, L. Harold DeWolf and S. Paul Schilling, a professor of systematic theology who had recently arrived at Boston University, failed to notice King's problematic use of sources. After reading a draft of the dissertation, DeWolf criticized him for failing to make explicit "presuppositions and norms employed in the critical evaluation," but his comments were largely positive. He commended King for his handling of a "difficult" topic "with broad learning, impressive ability and convincing mastery of the works immediately involved." Schilling found two problems with King's citation practices while reading the draft, but dismissed these as anomalous and praised the dissertation in his Second Reader's report....

As was true of King's other academic papers, the plagiaries in his dissertation escaped detection in his lifetime. His professors at Boston University, like those at Crozer, saw King as an earnest and even gifted student who presented consistent, though evolving, theological identity in his essays, exams and classroom comments.... Although the extent of King's plagiaries suggest he knew that he was at least skirting academic norms, the extant documents offer no direct evidence in this matter. Thus he may have simply become convinced, on the basis of his grades at Crozer and Boston, that his papers were sufficiently competent to withstand critical scrutiny. Moreover, King's actions during his early adulthood indicate that he increasingly saw himself as a preacher appropriating theological scholarship rather than as an academic producing such scholarship.

On page 340, it was stated that:

King's faulty citation practices were rooted in the notecards he created while conducted research on Tillich and Wieman. Large sections of the expository chapters are verbatim transcriptions of these notecards in which errors he had made while creating his notes are perpetuated. In one case, although King had properly quoted Tillich on the notecard, he used a section of the quotation in his dissertation without quotation marks. Some of the notecards were adequately paraphrased from Tillich and Weiman, but many others were nearly identical to the source. King rarely noted down proper citations as he took notes.

== Speeches ==
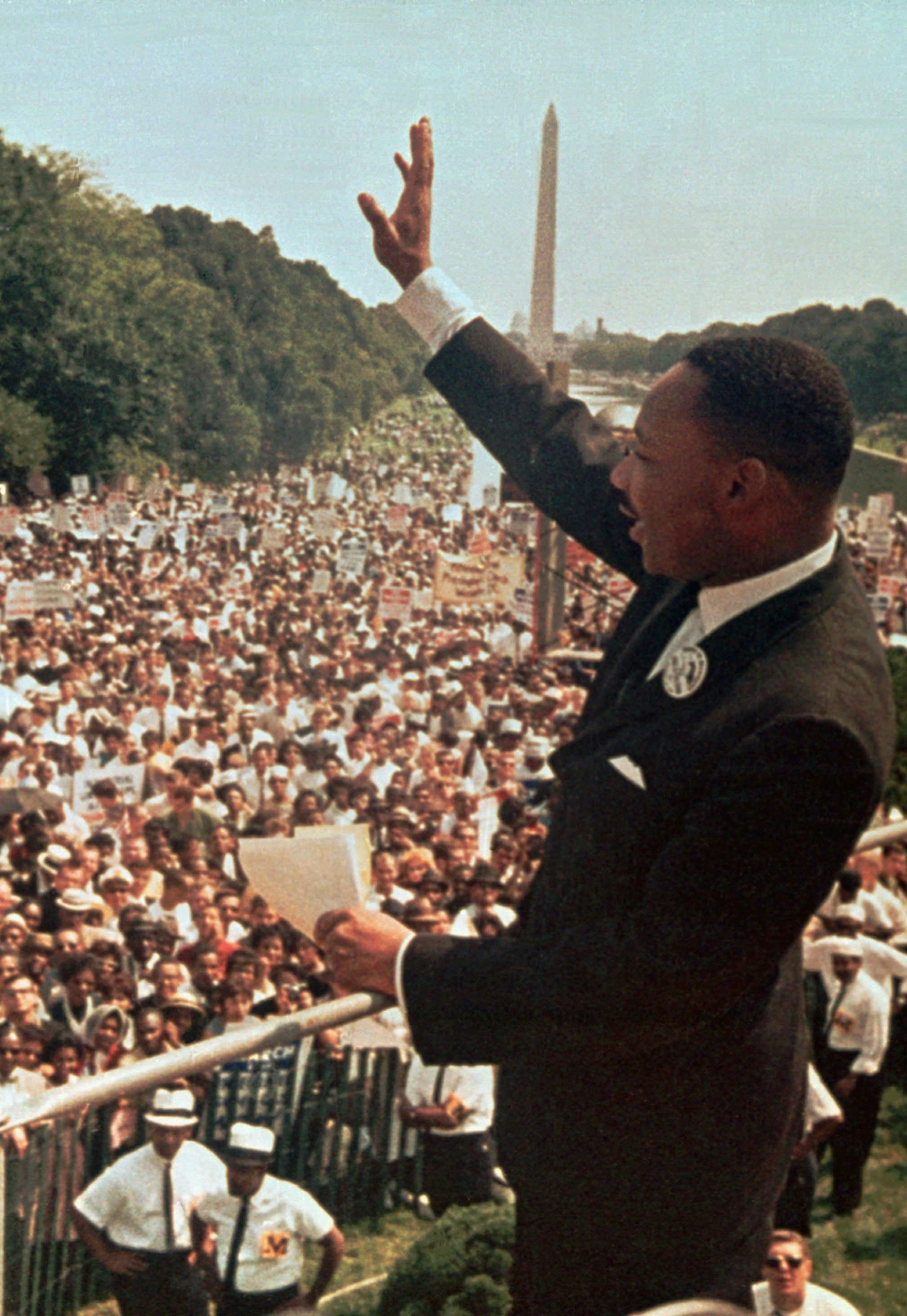
King gave his "I Have a Dream" speech during the March on Washington, August 28, 1963

King delivered his "I Have a Dream" speech at the 1963 March on Washington. Approaching the end of his prepared speech, King departed from his prepared text for a partly improvised peroration on the theme of "I have a dream", possibly prompted by Mahalia Jackson's repeated cry, "Tell them about the dream, Martin!"

In September 1962, SNCC activist Prathia Hall had spoken at a service commemorating Mount Olive Baptist Church in Terrell County, Georgia, which had been burned to the ground by the Ku Klux Klan. The service was attended by King and SCLC's strategist James Bevel. As Hall prayed, according to Bevel, "she spontaneously uttered and rhythmically repeated an inspiring phrase that captured her vision for the future-'I have a dream'". Bevel claimed that her use of this memorable phrase is what inspired King to begin to use it as a fixture in his sermons.

This closing section also partially resembles Archibald Carey Jr.'s address to the 1952 Republican National Convention. The similarity is that both speeches end with a recitation of the first verse of Samuel Francis Smith's popular patriotic hymn "America" ("My Country, 'Tis of Thee"), and the speeches refer to famous, iconic American mountain ranges, but only Stone Mountain of Georgia specifically appears in both speeches.

King and Carey had corresponded in the years between the two speeches. As early as 1956, King had given addresses elaborating on the lines from the song, and according to Clayborne Carson, by 1957 this theme had become part of King's oratorical repertoire.

Keith Miller, in Voice of Deliverance: The Language of Martin Luther King Jr. and Its Sources and elsewhere, argues that "voice merging", using the words of scripture, sacred text, and prior preachers follows in a long tradition of preaching, particularly in the African-American church, and should not be termed plagiarism. On the contrary, he views King's skillful combination of language from different sources as a major oratorical skill.
