= Paraphrase =

Rewording a text while preserving its meaning

A paraphrase (/ˈpærəˌfreɪz/) or rephrase is a rewording of a text that retains the original meaning. Paraphrasing can enhance clarity and effectiveness in conveying ideas. It involves expressing the same concepts as the original text in a new way. For example, when someone tells a story they have heard, they paraphrase it in their own words while preserving the meaning. The term comes from the Latin paraphrasis, from Ancient Greek παράφρασις (paráphrasis) 'additional manner of expression'. The act of paraphrasing is also called paraphrasis.

== History ==
Although paraphrases likely abounded in oral traditions, it dates back to at least Roman times, when Quintilian suggested it as a language exercise for students. This practice continued in the Middle Ages, with figures such as Geoffrey of Vinsauf incorporating paraphrasing into educational exercises to enhance students' language skills. The study of paraphrasing has gained significance due to issues surrounding plagiarism and the importance of original authorship.

== Types ==
Fred Inglis outlines five levels of paraphrasing for educational purposes:

1. replacing words with synonyms
2. varying sentence structure
3. reordering information
4. turning long sentences into multiple shorter ones (or vice versa)
5. expressing abstract concepts more concretely.

Some believe that using synonyms in paraphrasing can be a helpful learning tool; however, it is important to teach students how to restructure sentences to avoid plagiarism. Research on English language learners has shown that ESL students often rely on synonyms rather than altering sentence structure when paraphrasing. A study involving Vietnamese ESL learners revealed that they preferred using synonyms because they were afraid that changing the sentence structure could alter the meaning. Na and Mai recommend that ESL teachers incorporate diverse activities, including tasks that involve modifying syntax, to help students improve their paraphrasing skills. Additionally, students should be provided with source texts that they can easily comprehend to practice paraphrasing effectively.

Natural Language Processing researchers have identified different (atomic) types of paraphrases to study how humans rephrase text. These paraphrase types can be categorized into six main groups, each representing distinct methods of altering a text to communicate a comparable meaning:

1. morphology-based changes
2. lexicon-based changes
3. lexico-syntactic-based changes
4. syntax-based changes
5. discourse-based changes
6. extremes.

Morphology-based changes involve altering word formation, such as changing verb tenses or noun numbers. For example, changing "walks" to "walked" is a morphological change that adjusts the verb tense. Lexicon-based changes involve substituting words with synonyms or closely related terms without significantly changing the sentence structure. For instance, replacing "quick" with "fast" in a sentence conveys a similar speed attribute. Lexico-syntactic-based changes combine lexical modifications with sentence structure alterations. For instance, transforming an active voice sentence like "The cat chased the mouse" into a passive voice sentence, "The mouse was chased by the cat" involves changing both the sentence structure and some words. Syntax-based changes focus on sentence structure rather than individual words. For example, breaking down a complex sentence into two simpler sentences while retaining the original meaning falls under this category. Discourse-based changes, such as rearranging points in a paragraph or modifying how arguments are presented without changing the factual content, impact the overall text structure. Extreme changes involve significant alterations to the text, potentially introducing new information or omitting essential details, thereby stretching the boundaries of conventional paraphrasing.

Machine learning models have been developed to generate paraphrases with specific characteristics, such as high semantic similarity and diverse syntax. These models have various applications, such as aiding language learners by providing simplified paraphrases that highlight linguistic variations such as syntax. Universities can utilize these models to analyze students' assignments and detect content similarity for plagiarism detection. Additionally, different types of paraphrases, such as syntax and lexicon changes, are used for prompt engineering to enhance model performance by adjusting prompts in specific linguistic aspects.

== Analysis ==
A paraphrase is a restatement of a text that aims to clarify or explain its meaning. For instance, if the original text says, "The signal was red", it may be paraphrased as "The train was not allowed to pass as the red signal light was illuminated". A paraphrase can be introduced with verbum dicendi, a declaratory expression that signals the transition to the paraphrase. For example, in "The author states 'The signal was red', that is, the train was not allowed to proceed," the that is signals the paraphrase that follows.

A paraphrase does not need to accompany a direct quotation. The paraphrase typically serves to put the source's statement into perspective or to clarify the context in which it appeared. A paraphrase is typically more detailed than a summary. The source should be added at the end of the sentence: When the light was red, trains could not go (Wikipedia). A paraphrase may attempt to preserve the essential meaning of the material being paraphrased. Thus, the (intentional or otherwise) reinterpretation of a source to infer a meaning that is not explicitly evident in the source itself qualifies as "original research," and not a paraphrase. Unlike a metaphrase, which represents a "formal equivalent" of the source, a paraphrase represents a "dynamic equivalent" thereof. While a metaphrase attempts to literally translate a text, a paraphrase conveys the essential thought expressed in a source text—if necessary, at the expense of literality. For details, see dynamic and formal equivalence.

== In your own words ==
The term "in your own words" is commonly used to indicate that the writer has rephrased the text in their unique writing style—how they would have expressed the idea if they had created it. Presently, models exist for understanding and identifying paraphrases in natural language texts. Additionally, sentences can be paraphrased automatically using text simplification software.

== N'Ko ==
The N'Ko language uses a set of paired punctuation to indicate indirect quotations:

Unicode	Symbol	Name
U+2E1C	⸜	LEFT LOW PARAPHRASE BRACKET
U+2E1D	⸝	RIGHT LOW PARAPHRASE BRACKET

== See also ==
- Article spinning
- Automated paraphrasing
- Text simplification
- Rogeting
- Wikipedia:Close paraphrasing
