= Studywiz =

Online study or teaching platform

Studywiz Learning Environment
- Stable release: 9.4.4 08 build 74 / September 24, 2010; 15 years ago
- Website: studywiz.com (archived)

Studywiz Learning Environment, also known as Studywiz, was a learning management system. Studywiz provided a platform for teachers to create, mark, and share content such as tests, assignments, embedded video, audio resources, and file resources with students. StudyWiz was developed and supported by the ETech Group.

== Features ==
Studywiz offered an online portfolio for students' academic and extracurricular achievement as well as an online storage system. It also offered a mobile interface for handheld devices such as the iPod and iPad. Its content was compatible with SCORM.. The system also had ClickView digital video, an activity search, an individual student blog system, discussion boards, monitored chat rooms and a messaging system.

For instructors, the system provided a student assessment and marking system, attendance tracking, and parental login for visibility. The "Assignment" section allowed teachers to upload worksheets and tasks for students to view online and download, then complete and upload. A teacher can set the due date, assessment criteria, and outcomes. This could then be published to custom groups, classes, other students, and marks can also be shared to parents. A calendar could be set up for individual students and teachers, groups, classes, and for the whole school.

=== Studywiz Mobile ===
Studywiz Mobile was the interface for Studywiz, designed for portable handheld devices.

=== ePortfolio ===
ePortfolio was an online portfolio system built into later versions of Studywiz. It enabled students to generate, store, and publish school and extracurricular achievements online. From here, users could update, maintain, and export their content.

The ePortfolio featured Action Plans, which enable students to collaborate with their teachers to set personalized course of action for learning about the topics that interest them. Students could create records to document achievements, upload evidence (e.g., files or links), and add reflections or feedback. These records could be organized using customizable templates that guide the students in storing and presenting their achievements. Students could curate their records into collections, which can be reviewed and verified by teachers.

Others

Studywiz also included a number of other modular components and modular extensions including:

- Mobile QT – Allowed QTI assessments to be taken on mobile devices.
- ClickView – Enabled integration with ClickView.
- eLocker Mapping – linked the Studywiz eLocker with a school network.
- Gmail – integrated the Gmail email system with Studywiz.
- Widgit – Allowed Widgit symbol system for text within Studywiz.
- Mobile eLocker – Allowed access to Studywiz eLocker on mobile devices in and away from school.
- SMS – Used to send SMS text messages through Studywiz.
