= PlagTracker =

Internet-based plagiarism-prevention service

- Website type: Plagiarism search
- Available in: Multilingual
- Owner: Devellar
- Revenue: From premium services
- Website: www.plagtracker.com
- Commercial: Yes
- Registration: Optional
- Launched: 2011
- Current status: Active

PlagTracker is a Ukrainian-based online plagiarism detection service that checks whether similar text content appears elsewhere on the web. It was launched in 2011 by Devellar.

PlagTracker is used by content owners (students, teachers, bloggers, researchers) to detect cases of "content theft", in which content is copied, without the permission of the author or owner, from one site to another. Many content publishers also use it to detect cases of content fraud, in which old content is repackaged and sold as new original content.

In July 2011, the website saw 20 percent of visitors coming from Asia out of its 5,000 daily visitors. The US is the number one biggest user of the site, with India in second place. Other heavy users are Malaysia, the Philippines, Pakistan, and Singapore, all in the top 10.

== Overview ==
Initially, the URL or text of the original content is transferred to the webpage; PlagTracker returns a list of web pages that contain similar text to all or parts of this content. The matching text is highlighted on the found web page.

For using, the program may take more time to develop a report based on the length of the paper and the amount of plagiarized content. Once the report appears, any potentially plagiarized portions of the paper are highlighted in red to show the plagiarized content. Clicking on the highlighted portions of the paper will reveal a list of the site or sites from which the same content may have come. PlagTracker is used in abundance in United States, Finland, United Kingdom and Asian countries, such as Bangladesh, Indonesia, Philippines, India, Pakistan, and others.

PlagTracker also provides a premium service that allows the user to upload documents instead of copying and pasting text. For premium users, a stronger plagiarism checking and professional editing assistance is available. The premium plan is faster than the free version. Users can also perform grammar checks and can download and upload pdf files.

== Design and independent evaluation ==
PlagTracker uses a proprietary algorithm to scan a given document and compare it to the content sources across a database of academic papers and the Internet. It uses a set of algorithms to identify copied content that has been modified from its original form. It is multilingual (English, French, German, Spanish, Romanian) though the algorithm also analyzes any Latin or Cyrillic symbols.

== See also ==
- Plagiarism
- Plagiarism detection
