= IThenticate =

Plagiarism detection service

iThenticate
- Website type: Online SaaS editor
- Website: ithenticate.com
- Commercial: Yes
- Registration: Yes
- Content licence: Proprietary

iThenticate is a plagiarism detection service for the corporate market, from Turnitin, LLC, which also runs Plagiarism.org.

== History ==
The service was launched in 2004 and is headquartered in Oakland, California. It is marketed to "publishers, news agencies, corporations, law firms, and government agencies". As of 2007, its clients included the World Health Organization, the United Nations, and the World Bank.

While iThenticate is best known as a plagiarism detection service, collaborative efforts with the user base have created a number of new use cases. The most prominent aside from plagiarism detection include intellectual property protection and document-versus-document(s) analysis. iThenticate also allows for integration with content management systems (CMSs) and manuscript tracking systems (MTSs).

CrossCheck Powered by iThenticate is a re-branded version of the iThenticate service developed in partnership with CrossRef, a community of notable scientific, technical, and medical publishers. CrossCheck received the Association for Learned and Professional Society Publishers Award for Publishing Innovation in 2008.

Following a 2004 high-profile case in the Hartford Courant, the newspaper subscribed to iThenticate. The company then extended invitations to other newspapers, but stated that it would maintain the confidentiality of these subscribers.

The company made headlines on July 2, 2006, when the New York Post reported that iThenticate software had found several passages of plagiarism in Ann Coulter's book, Godless. Both Coulter's syndicator and her publisher rejected these claims, describing them as irresponsible and stating that minimal text matching of common subjects does not equal plagiarism.

A 2023 study compared the performance of four plagiarism detection services on ChatGPT-generated articles. iThenticate performed better than Small SEO Tools, but not as well as Grammarly.

== See also ==
- Turnitin
