= Turnitin =

Internet-based plagiarism-prevention service

- Company type: Subsidiary
- Website type: Online SaaS editor
- Founded: 1998
- Headquarters: 2101 Webster Street Suite 1800 Oakland, California 94612, United States
- Area served: Worldwide
- Industry: Education
- Parent: Advance Publications
- Website: www.turnitin.com
- Commercial: Yes
- Registration: Yes
- Users: 16,000 institutions; (71M+ students)
- Content license: Proprietary

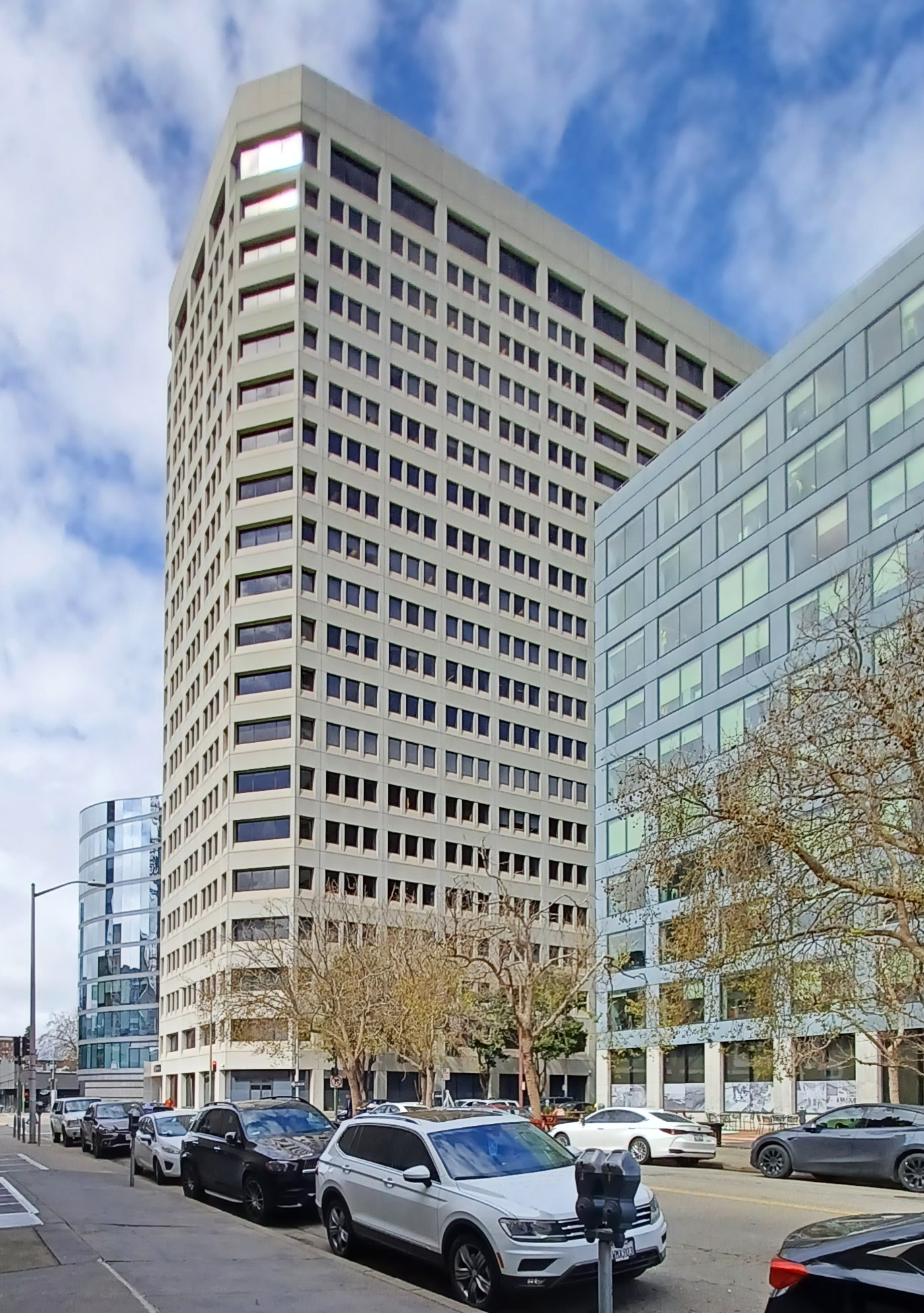
Location of Turnitin's Oakland office

Turnitin (stylized as turnitin) is an Internet-based similarity detection service run by the American company Turnitin, LLC, a subsidiary of Advance Publications. The software as a service (SaaS) website sells automated checks of submitted documents against its database of prior submitted documents and the content of other websites to identify plagiarism. As of 2025, the company licenses access to its services to over 16,000 universities and high schools worldwide, with more than 71 million students enrolled, but as early as 2006, Princeton, Harvard, Yale and Stanford decided not to use Turnitin.

== Company history ==
Turnitin originated in 1994 at the University of California, Berkeley, where graduate student John M. Barrie developed an online peer-review system that later evolved into plagiarism-detection software. To commercialize the system, he and collaborators Christian Storm, Emmanuel (Max-Emmanuel) Briand and Melissa Lipscomb established iParadigms LLC in 1996. Development of the Turnitin platform progressed over the next several years. The company introduced the Turnitin service in 1998, launched its precursor site Plagiarism.org to the public in April 1999, and released Turnitin.com more broadly in early 2000.

In 2018, Turnitin acquired the plagiarism-detection service VeriCite, expanding its presence among U.S. higher-education institutions. The following year, it was purchased by Advance Publications for US$1.75 billion, marking one of the largest acquisitions in the educational-technology sector at the time. Turnitin continued to broaden its reach by acquiring Unicheck in 2020 and Ouriginal in 2021, the latter formed from the merger of Urkund and PlagScan. These additions consolidated Turnitin’s position as a leading provider of academic-integrity and text-matching software worldwide.

== Functionality ==
The Turnitin software checks for potentially unoriginal content by comparing submitted papers to several databases using a proprietary algorithm. It scans its own databases and also has licensing agreements with large academic proprietary databases.

Results can identify similarities with existing sources and can also be used in formative assessment to help students learn to avoid plagiarism and improve their writing.

Turnitin, LLC also runs the informational website plagiarism.org and offers a similar plagiarism-detection service for newspaper editors and book and magazine publishers called iThenticate. Other tools included with the Turnitin suite are GradeMark (online grading and corrective feedback) and PeerMark (student peer-review service).

=== Artificial intelligence content detection ===
In early 2023, Turnitin released a feature that aims to detect content generated by artificial intelligence applications like ChatGPT; however, the accuracy of AI content detection remains a topic of debate.

Later that year, some schools disabled Turnitin's AI detection software due to concerns that, like all other AI detection tools the software is not entirely accurate. Concerns arose after cases were brought with students alleging Turnitin falsely accused them of using AI. This has happened when students use the grammar-correcting software Grammarly, which is recommended for student use by many schools. Turnitin says that they believe about 1% of the papers they flag as AI-written were actually written by humans, and that a much higher rate is generated by AI but not flagged.

=== Student-paper database ===
The essays submitted by students are stored in a database used to check for plagiarism. This prevents one student from using another student's paper by identifying matching text between papers. In addition to student papers, the database contains a copy of the publicly accessible Internet, with the company using a web crawler to add content to Turnitin's archive continually. It also contains commercial and/or copyrighted pages from books, newspapers, and journals.

As of June 2025, the company's student-paper database contained 1.9 billion submissions.

=== Classroom integration ===
If requested by teachers, students can upload their papers directly to the service for teachers to access them there. Teachers may also submit student papers to Turnitin.com as individual files, by bulk upload, or as a ZIP file. Teachers can further set assignment-analysis options so that students can review the system's "originality reports" before they finalize their submission. A peer-review option is also available.

Some virtual learning environments can be configured to support Turnitin, so that student assignments can be automatically submitted for analysis. Blackboard, Moodle, ANGEL, Instructure, Desire2Learn, Pearson Learning Studio, Sakai, and Studywiz integrate in some way with the software.

=== Admissions applications ===
In 2019, Turnitin began analyzing admissions application materials through a partner software, Kira Talent.

== Technical flaws ==
=== Ad hoc encodings, fonts, and text representation ===
Several flaws and bugs in the Turnitin plagiarism detection software have been documented in scientific literature. In particular, Turnitin has been proven to be vulnerable to

1. ad hoc text encodings,
2. rearranged glyphs in a computer font,
3. text replaced with Bézier curves representing its shape.

=== Automated paraphrasing ===
Another study showed that Turnitin failed to detect text produced by popular free Internet-based paraphrasing tools. Besides, more sophisticated machine learning techniques, such as automated paraphrasing, can produce natural and expressive text, which is virtually impossible for Turnitin to detect. Also, article spinning was not recognized by Turnitin. Asked about the situation, the then vice president of marketing at Turnitin Chris Harrick said that the company was "working on a solution", but it was "not a big concern" because in his opinion "the quality of these tools is pretty poor".

=== Terminology usage ===
In 2009, a group of researchers from Texas Tech University reported that many of the instances of "non-originality" that Turnitin finds are not plagiarism but the use of jargon, course terms, or phrases that appeared for legitimate reasons. For example, the researchers found high percentages of flagged material in the topic terms of papers (e.g. "global warming") or "topic phrases", which they defined as the paper topic with a few words added (e.g. "the prevalence of childhood obesity continues to rise").

=== Turnitin's response ===
Several years later, Turnitin published an article titled "Can students trick Turnitin? Some students believe that they can 'beat' Turnitin by employing various tactics". The company denied any technical issues and said that "the authors of these 'tricks' are mostly essay mills." The article then listed a few possible "tricks" and how Turnitin intended to take care of them, without mentioning scientific literature, technical treatises or examples of source code.

== Legal and ethical criticism ==
Students may be required to submit work to Turnitin as a requirement of taking a certain course or class. The software has been a source of controversy, with some students refusing to submit, arguing that requiring submission implies a presumption of guilt. Some critics have alleged that the use of this proprietary software violates educational privacy as well as international intellectual-property laws, and exploits students' works for commercial purposes by permanently storing them in Turnitin's privately held database.

=== Privacy ===
The Student Union at Dalhousie University has criticized the use of Turnitin at Canadian universities because the American government may be able to access the submitted papers and personal information in the database under the USA PATRIOT Act. Mount Saint Vincent University became the first Canadian university to ban Turnitin's service partly because of implications of the Act.

=== Copyright violation concerns ===
Lawyers for the company claim that student work is covered under the theory of implied license to evaluate, since it would be pointless to write the essays if they were not meant to be graded. That implied license, the lawyers argue, thus grants Turnitin permission to copy, reproduce, and preserve the works. The company's lawyers further claim that dissertations and theses also carry with them an implied permission to archive in a publicly accessible collection such as a university library.

University of Minnesota Law School Professor Dan Burk countered that the company's use of the papers may not meet the fair-use test for several reasons:

- The company copies the entire paper, not just a portion
- Students' work is often original, interpretive, and creative rather than just a compilation of established facts
- Turnitin is a commercial enterprise

When a group of students filed suit against Turnitin on that basis, in Vanderhye et al. v. iParadigms LLC, the district court found the practice fell within fair use in the United States; on appeal, the United States Court of Appeals for the Fourth Circuit affirmed.

=== Presumption of guilt ===
Some students argue that requiring them to submit papers to Turnitin creates a presumption of guilt, which may violate scholastic disciplinary codes and applicable local laws and judicial practice. Some teachers and professors support this argument when attempting to discourage schools from using Turnitin.

== Litigation ==
In one well-publicized dispute over mandatory Turnitin submissions, Jesse Rosenfeld, a student at McGill University declined, in 2004, to submit his academic work to Turnitin. The University Senate eventually ruled that Rosenfeld's assignments were to be graded without using the service. The following year, another McGill student, Denise Brunsdon, refused to submit her assignment to Turnitin.com and won a similar ruling from the Senate Committee on Student Grievances.

In 2006, the Senate at Mount Saint Vincent University in Nova Scotia prohibited the submission of students' academic work to Turnitin.com and any software that requires students' work to become part of an external database where other parties might have access to it. This decision was granted after the students' union alerted the university community of their legal and privacy concerns associated with the use of Turnitin.com and other anti-plagiarism devices that profit from students' academic work. This was the first campus-wide ban of its kind in Canada, following decisions by Princeton, Harvard, Yale and Stanford not to use Turnitin.

At Toronto Metropolitan University in Toronto, students may decide whether to submit their work to Turnitin.com or make alternate arrangements with an instructor. Similar policies are in place at Brock University in Saint Catharines.

On March 27, 2007, with the help of an intellectual property attorney, two students from McLean High School in Virginia (with assistance from the Committee For Students' Rights) and two students attending Desert Vista High School in Phoenix, Arizona, filed suit in United States Circuit Court (Eastern District, Alexandria Division) alleging copyright infringement by iParadigms, Turnitin's parent company. Nearly a year later, Judge Claude M. Hilton granted summary judgment on the students' complaint in favor of iParadigms/Turnitin, because they had accepted the click-wrap agreement on the Turnitin website. The students appealed the ruling, and in 2009, the United States Court of Appeals for the Fourth Circuit affirmed Judge Hilton's judgment in favor of iParadigms/Turnitin.

== Corporate practices criticism ==
The Italian scholar Michele Cortelazzo, professor of linguistics who also studies copyright attribution and similarity between texts, noted that, ironically, it is impossible to tell if Turnitin's source code has been plagiarized from other sources, because it is not open source. For the same reason, it is unknown what scientific methodologies, if any, Turnitin uses to assess papers.

Turnitin was also criticized for paying panelists at conferences on education and writing.

iParadigms, the company that once owned Turnitin, ran another commercial website called WriteCheck. On this website, students pay a fee to have a paper tested against the database used by Turnitin to determine whether or not that paper would be detected as plagiarism when the student submits that paper to the Turnitin website. It was announced that the WriteCheck product was being withdrawn in 2020 with no new subscriptions being accepted after November 2019. The economist Alex Tabarrok has complained that Turnitin's systems "are warlords who are arming both sides in this plagiarism war". The website is no longer active.

In June 2025, The Markup revealed that Turnitin was charging universities widely divergent prices for access to Turnitin's plagiarism detection services, ranging from $1.79 per student paid by the City University of New York system to $6.50 per student paid by the UC Irvine Division of Continuing Education during the 2021-2022 academic year. In 2024, the California State University system was charged $2.71 per student annually, with an additional $3.19 per student for an AI detection upgrade, while South Orange County Community College paid $3.57 per student for the same service. The University of California, Berkeley, signed a 10-year contract valued at $1.2 million, and the California State University system paid $6 million over seven years through 2024.

== See also ==
- iThenticate
- Artificial intelligence content detection
