= Content similarity detection =

Process of detecting plagiarism and/or copyright infringement

Content similarity detection or plagiarism detection is the process of locating instances of plagiarism or copyright infringement within a work or document. The widespread use of computers and the advent of the Internet have made it easier to plagiarize the work of others.

Detection of plagiarism can be undertaken in a variety of ways. Human detection is the most traditional form of identifying plagiarism from written work. This can be a lengthy and time-consuming task for the reader and can also result in inconsistencies in how plagiarism is identified within an organization. Text-matching software (TMS), which is also referred to as "plagiarism detection software" or "anti-plagiarism" software, has become widely available, in the form of both commercially available products as well as open-source software. TMS does not actually detect plagiarism per se, but instead finds specific passages of text in one document that match text in another document.

== Software-assisted plagiarism detection ==
Computer-assisted plagiarism detection is an Information retrieval (IR) task supported by specialized IR systems, which is referred to as a plagiarism detection system (PDS) or document similarity detection system.

=== In text documents ===
Systems for text similarity detection implement one of two generic detection approaches, one being external, the other being intrinsic. External detection systems compare a suspicious document with a reference collection, which is a set of documents assumed to be genuine. Based on a chosen document model and predefined similarity criteria, the detection task is to retrieve all documents that contain text that is similar to a degree above a chosen threshold to text in the suspicious document. Intrinsic PDSes solely analyze the text to be evaluated without performing comparisons to external documents. This approach aims to recognize changes in the unique writing style of an author as an indicator for potential plagiarism. PDSes are not capable of reliably identifying plagiarism without human judgment. Similarities and writing style features are computed with the help of predefined document models and might represent false positives.

==== Effectiveness of those tools in higher education settings ====
A study was conducted to test the effectiveness of similarity detection software in a higher education setting. One part of the study assigned one group of students to write a paper. These students were first educated about plagiarism and informed that their work was to be run through a content similarity detection system. A second group of students was assigned to write a paper without any information about plagiarism. The researchers expected to find lower rates in group one but found roughly the same rates of plagiarism in both groups.

==== Approaches ====
The figure below represents a classification of detection approaches used for computer-assisted content similarity detection. The approaches are characterized by the type of similarity assessment they undertake: global or local. Global similarity assessment approaches use the characteristics taken from larger parts of the text or the document as a whole to compute similarity, while local methods only examine pre-selected text segments as input.

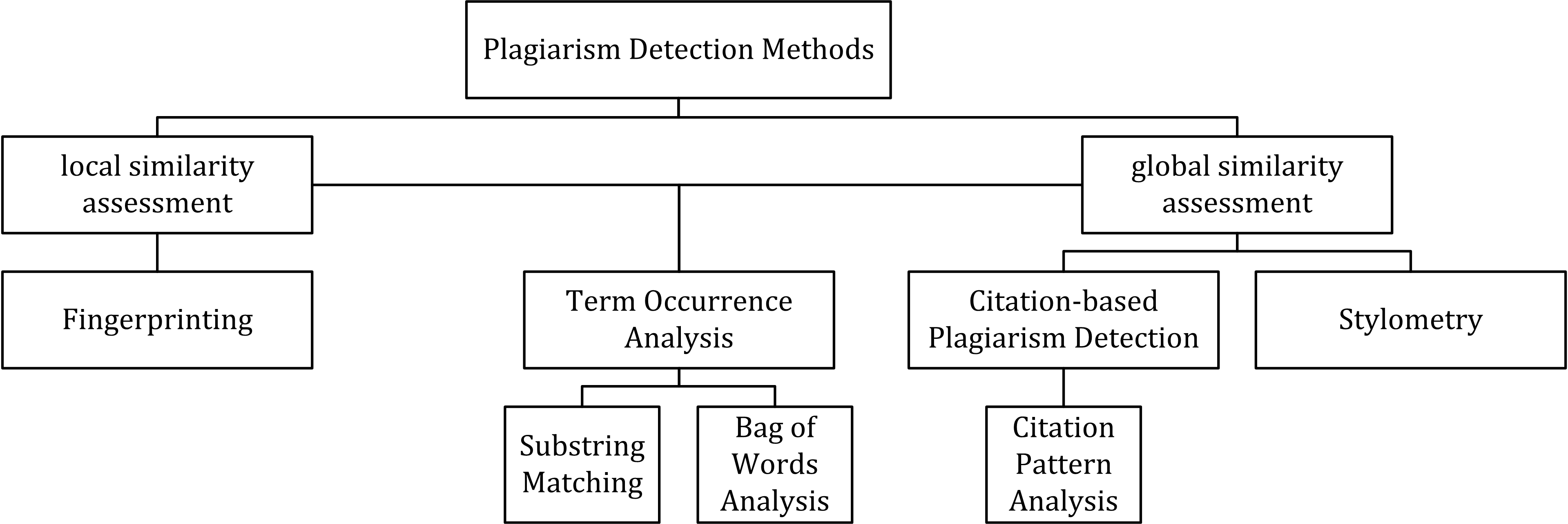
Classification of computer-assisted plagiarism detection methods

===== Fingerprinting =====
Fingerprinting is currently the most widely applied approach to content similarity detection. This method forms representative digests of documents by selecting a set of multiple substrings (n-grams) from them. The sets represent the fingerprints and their elements are called minutiae. A suspicious document is checked for plagiarism by computing its fingerprint and querying minutiae with a precomputed index of fingerprints for all documents of a reference collection. Minutiae matching with those of other documents indicate shared text segments and suggest potential plagiarism if they exceed a chosen similarity threshold. Computational resources and time are limiting factors to fingerprinting, which is why this method typically only compares a subset of minutiae to speed up the computation and allow for checks in very large collection, such as the Internet.

===== String matching =====
String matching is a prevalent approach used in computer science. When applied to the problem of plagiarism detection, documents are compared for verbatim text overlaps. Numerous methods have been proposed to tackle this task, of which some have been adapted to external plagiarism detection. Checking a suspicious document in this setting requires the computation and storage of efficiently comparable representations for all documents in the reference collection to compare them pairwise. Generally, suffix document models, such as suffix trees or suffix vectors, have been used for this task. Nonetheless, substring matching remains computationally expensive, which makes it a non-viable solution for checking large collections of documents.

===== Bag of words =====
Bag of words analysis represents the adoption of vector space retrieval, a traditional IR concept, to the domain of content similarity detection. Documents are represented as one or multiple vectors, e.g. for different document parts, which are used for pair wise similarity computations. Similarity computation may then rely on the traditional cosine similarity measure, or on more sophisticated similarity measures.

===== Citation analysis =====
Citation-based plagiarism detection (CbPD) relies on citation analysis, and is the only approach to plagiarism detection that does not rely on the textual similarity. CbPD examines the citation and reference information in texts to identify similar patterns in the citation sequences. As such, this approach is suitable for scientific texts, or other academic documents that contain citations. Citation analysis to detect plagiarism is a relatively young concept. It has not been adopted by commercial software, but a first prototype of a citation-based plagiarism detection system exists. Similar order and proximity of citations in the examined documents are the main criteria used to compute citation pattern similarities. Citation patterns represent subsequences non-exclusively containing citations shared by the documents compared. Factors, including the absolute number or relative fraction of shared citations in the pattern, as well as the probability that citations co-occur in a document are also considered to quantify the patterns' degree of similarity.

===== Stylometry =====
Stylometry subsumes statistical methods for quantifying an author's unique writing style and is mainly used for authorship attribution or intrinsic plagiarism detection. Detecting plagiarism by authorship attribution requires checking whether the writing style of the suspicious document, which is written supposedly by a certain author, matches with that of a corpus of documents written by the same author. Intrinsic plagiarism detection, on the other hand, uncovers plagiarism based on internal evidences in the suspicious document without comparing it with other documents. This is performed by constructing and comparing stylometric models for different text segments of the suspicious document, and passages that are stylistically different from others are marked as potentially plagiarized/infringed. Although they are simple to extract, character n-grams are proven to be among the best stylometric features for intrinsic plagiarism detection.

===== Neural networks =====
More recent approaches to assess content similarity using neural networks have achieved significantly greater accuracy, but come at great computational cost. Traditional neural network approaches embed both pieces of content into semantic vector embeddings to calculate their similarity, which is often their cosine similarity. More advanced methods perform end-to-end prediction of similarity or classifications using the Transformer architecture. Paraphrase detection particularly benefits from highly parameterized pre-trained models.

==== Performance ====
Comparative evaluations of content similarity detection systems indicate that their performance depends on the type of plagiarism present (see figure). Except for citation pattern analysis, all detection approaches rely on textual similarity. It is therefore symptomatic that detection accuracy decreases the more plagiarism cases are obfuscated.

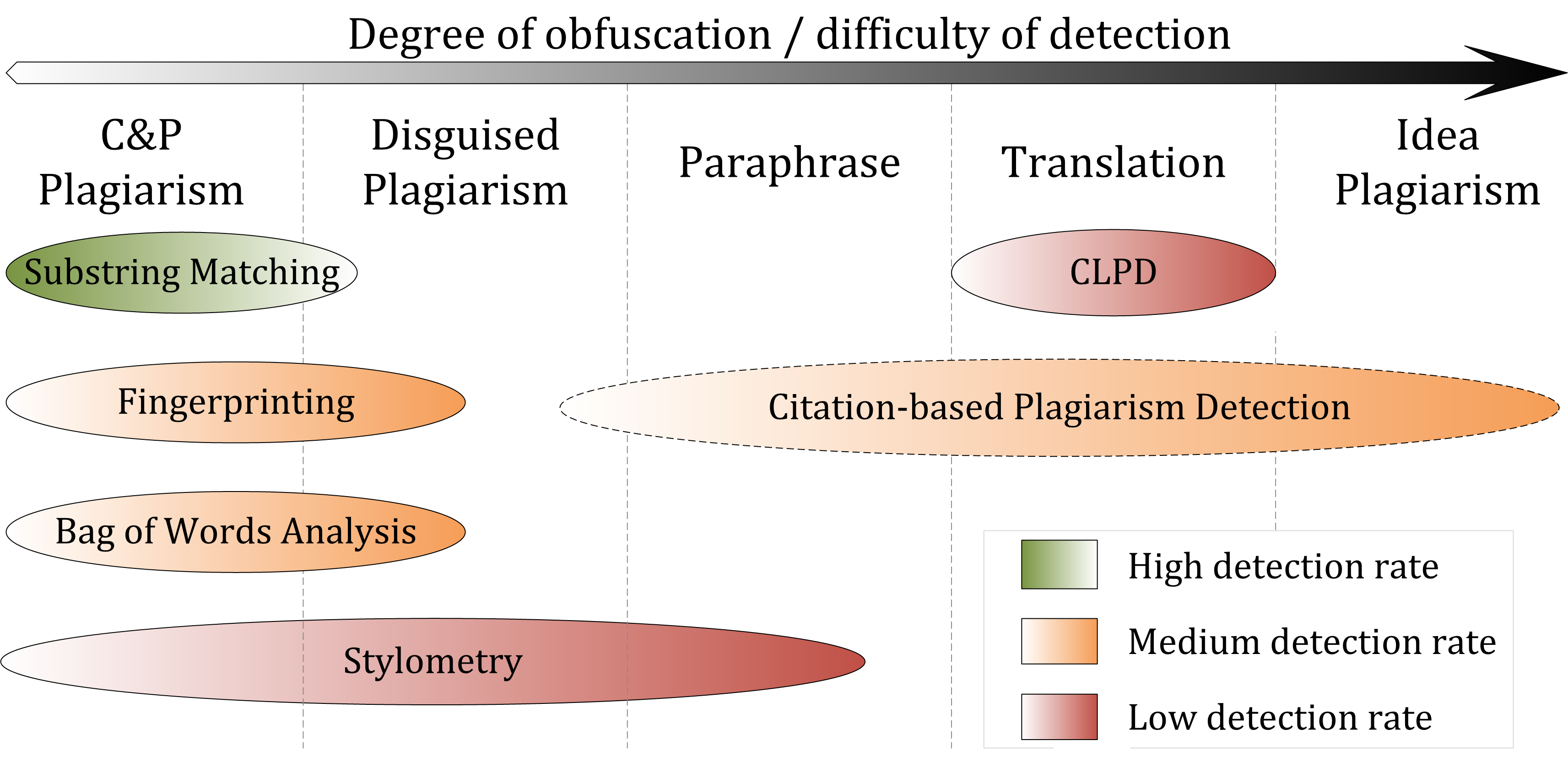
Detection performance of computer-assisted plagiarism detection approaches depending on the type of plagiarism being present

Literal copies, a.k.a. copy and paste plagiarism or blatant copyright infringement, or modestly disguised plagiarism cases can be detected with high accuracy by current external PDS if the source is accessible to the software. In particular, substring matching procedures achieve good performance for copy and paste plagiarism, since they commonly use lossless document models, such as suffix trees. The performance of systems using fingerprinting or bag of words analysis in detecting copies depends on the information loss incurred by the document model used. By applying flexible chunking and selection strategies, they are better capable of detecting moderate forms of disguised plagiarism when compared to substring matching procedures.

Intrinsic plagiarism detection using stylometry can overcome the boundaries of textual similarity to some extent by comparing linguistic similarity. Given that the stylistic differences between plagiarized and original segments are significant and can be identified reliably, stylometry can help in identifying disguised and paraphrased plagiarism. Stylometric comparisons are likely to fail in cases where segments are strongly paraphrased to the point where they more closely resemble the personal writing style of the plagiarist or if a text was compiled by multiple authors. The results of the International Competitions on Plagiarism Detection held in 2009, 2010 and 2011, as well as experiments performed by Stein, indicate that stylometric analysis seems to work reliably only for document lengths of several thousand or tens of thousands of words, which limits the applicability of the method to computer-assisted plagiarism detection settings.

An increasing amount of research is performed on methods and systems capable of detecting translated plagiarism. Currently, cross-language plagiarism detection (CLPD) is not viewed as a mature technology and respective systems have not been able to achieve satisfying detection results in practice.

Citation-based plagiarism detection using citation pattern analysis is capable of identifying stronger paraphrases and translations with higher success rates when compared to other detection approaches, because it is independent of textual characteristics. However, since citation-pattern analysis depends on the availability of sufficient citation information, it is limited to academic texts. It remains inferior to text-based approaches in detecting shorter plagiarized passages, which are typical for cases of copy-and-paste or shake-and-paste plagiarism; the latter refers to mixing slightly altered fragments from different sources.

==== Software ====
The design of content similarity detection software for use with text documents is characterized by a number of factors:[46]

| Factor | Description and alternatives |
|---|---|
| Scope of search | In the public internet, using search engines / Institutional databases / Local, system-specific database. |
| Analysis time | Delay between the time a document is submitted and the time when results are made available. |
| Document capacity / Batch processing | Number of documents the system can process per unit of time. |
| Check intensity | How often and for which types of document fragments (paragraphs, sentences, fixed-length word sequences) does the system query external resources, such as search engines. |
| Comparison algorithm type | The algorithms that define the way the system uses to compare documents against each other. |
| Precision and recall | Number of documents correctly flagged as plagiarized compared to the total number of flagged documents, and to the total number of documents that were actually plagiarized. High precision means that few false positives were found, and high recall means that few false negatives were left undetected. |

Most large-scale plagiarism detection systems use large, internal databases (in addition to other resources) that grow with each additional document submitted for analysis. However, this feature is considered by some as a violation of student copyright.

=== In source code ===
Plagiarism in computer source code is also frequent, and requires different tools than those used for text comparisons in document. Significant research has been dedicated to academic source-code plagiarism.

A distinctive aspect of source-code plagiarism is that there are no essay mills, such as can be found in traditional plagiarism. Since most programming assignments expect students to write programs with very specific requirements, it is very difficult to find existing programs that already meet them. Since integrating external code is often harder than writing it from scratch, most plagiarizing students choose to do so from their peers.

According to Roy and Cordy, source-code similarity detection algorithms can be classified as based on either

- Strings – look for exact textual matches of segments, for instance five-word runs. Fast, but can be confused by renaming identifiers.
- Tokens – as with strings, but using a lexer to convert the program into tokens first. This discards whitespace, comments, and identifier names, making the system more robust against simple text replacements. Most academic plagiarism detection systems work at this level, using different algorithms to measure the similarity between token sequences.
- Parse Trees – build and compare parse trees. This allows higher-level similarities to be detected. For instance, tree comparison can normalize conditional statements, and detect equivalent constructs as similar to each other.
- Program Dependency Graphs (PDGs) – a PDG captures the actual flow of control in a program, and allows much higher-level equivalences to be located, at a greater expense in complexity and calculation time.
- Metrics – metrics capture 'scores' of code segments according to certain criteria; for instance, "the number of loops and conditionals", or "the number of different variables used". Metrics are simple to calculate and can be compared quickly, but can also lead to false positives: two fragments with the same scores on a set of metrics may do entirely different things.
- Hybrid approaches – for instance, parse trees + suffix trees can combine the detection capability of parse trees with the speed afforded by suffix trees, a type of string-matching data structure.

The previous classification was developed for code refactoring, and not for academic plagiarism detection (an important goal of refactoring is to avoid duplicate code, referred to as code clones in the literature). The above approaches are effective against different levels of similarity; low-level similarity refers to identical text, while high-level similarity can be due to similar specifications. In an academic setting, when all students are expected to code to the same specifications, functionally equivalent code (with high-level similarity) is entirely expected, and only low-level similarity is considered as proof of cheating.

Difference between Plagiarism and Copyright

Plagiarism and copyright are essential concepts in academic and creative writing that writers, researchers, and students have to understand. Although they may sound similar, they are not; different strategies can be used to address each of them.

==== Algorithms ====
A number of algorithms have been proposed to detect duplicate code. For example:

- Baker's algorithm.
- Rabin–Karp string search algorithm.
- Using abstract syntax trees.
- Visual clone detection.
- Count matrix clone detection.
- Locality-sensitive hashing
- Anti-unification

== Complications with the use of text-matching software for plagiarism detection ==
Various complications have been documented with the use of text-matching software when used for plagiarism detection. One of the more prevalent concerns documented centers on the issue of intellectual property rights. The basic argument is that materials must be added to a database in order for the TMS to effectively determine a match, but adding users' materials to such a database may infringe on their intellectual property rights. The issue has been raised in a number of court cases.

An additional complication with the use of TMS is that the software finds only precise matches to other text. It does not pick up poorly paraphrased work, for example, or the practice of plagiarizing by use of sufficient word substitutions to elude detection software, which is known as rogeting. It also cannot evaluate whether the paraphrase genuinely reflects an original understanding or is an attempt to bypass detection.

Another complication with TMS is its tendency to flag much more content than necessary, including legitimate citations and paraphrasing, making it difficult to find real cases of plagiarism. This issue arises because TMS algorithms mainly look at surface-level text similarities without considering the context of the writing. Educators have raised concerns that reliance on TMS may shift focus away from teaching proper citation and writing skills, and may create an oversimplified view of plagiarism that disregards the nuances of student writing. As a result, scholars argue that these false positives can cause fear in students and discourage them from using their authentic voice.

== See also ==
- Artificial intelligence detection software – Software to detect AI-generated content
- Category:Plagiarism detectors
- Comparison of anti-plagiarism software
- Locality-sensitive hashing – Algorithmic technique using hashing
- Nearest neighbor search – Optimization problem in computer science
- Paraphrase detection – Automatic generation or recognition of paraphrased text
- Kolmogorov complexity § Compression – used to estimate similarity between token sequences in several systems
- Video copy detection – Detection of illegally copied video

== Literature ==
- Carroll, J. (2002). A handbook for deterring plagiarism in higher education. Oxford: The Oxford Centre for Staff and Learning Development, Oxford Brookes University. (96 p.), ISBN 1873576560
- Zeidman, B. (2011). The Software IP Detective's Handbook. Prentice Hall. (480 p.), ISBN 0137035330
