= Eric Patterson =

Eric Patterson may refer to:

- Eric Patterson (baseball), American baseball player
- Eric Patterson (American football), American football cornerback
- Eric D. Patterson, American political scientist
- L. Eric Patterson, United States Air Force general

== See also ==
- Erik Patterson, American screenwriter, television writer, and playwright
- Eric Paterson, Canadian ice hockey player
