= Tim Winter =

Tim Winter may refer to:

- Timothy Winter, British Islamic scholar
- Tim Winter (sociologist), Australian sociologist
