= Berkley Center for Religion, Peace, and World Affairs =

Academic institute at Georgetown University, Washington DC

Logo of the Berkley Center for Religion, Peace, and World Affairs at Georgetown University

The Berkley Center for Religion, Peace, and World Affairs (or simply Berkley Center) is an academic research center at Georgetown University in Washington, DC dedicated to the interdisciplinary study of religion, ethics, and politics. The center was founded in 2006 under a gift from William R. Berkley, a member of Georgetown's Board of Directors. The center's founding director is Thomas Banchoff.

== Senior Fellows ==
- José Casanova (sociologist)
- Jocelyne Cesari
- Rev. Drew Christiansen SJ
- Paul Elie
- Rev. David Hollenbach SJ
- Terrence L. Johnson
- Katherine Marshall

== Senior Research Fellows ==
- Judd Birdsall
- Erin Cline
- E. J. Dionne, Jr.
- Peter Mandaville
- Elisa Massimino
- Jane McAuliffe
- Rev. Gerard McGlone SJ
- Amelia Uelmen
- Julia Watts Belser
- William Werpehowski

== Faculty Fellows ==
- Marjorie Mandelstam Balzer
- Julia Lamm
- Rev. Leo D. Lefebure
- Rev. Daniel Madigan SJ
- Fathali Moghaddam
- Lise Morjé Howard
- Rev. Peter C. Phan
- Jonathan Ray
- Shannon Stimson

== Research Fellows ==
- Jerome Copulsky
- Irina du Quenoy
- Peter Gent
- Julio Giulietti
- Kristine Kalanges
- David Little
- Paul Manuel
- David Marshall
- Sarah Moses
- Eric D. Patterson
- Margaret Paxson
- Debora Tonelli
- Asma Uddin
- Jim Wallis
