= Jocelyne Cesari =

French political scientist and Islamic studies scholar

Jocelyne Cesari (born 1962) is a French political scientist and Islamic studies scholar who is tenured at the French National Center for Scientific Research in Paris. Her works focus on religion and international relations, Islam and globalization, Islam and secularism, immigration, and religious pluralism.

== Biography ==
From 2011 to 2012, Cesari was the Minerva Chair at the National Defense University in Washington, D.C. Since September 2015, she has been Professor of Religion and Politics at the Department of Theology and Religion, University of Birmingham.

Since 2018, Cesari has been the T. J. Dermot Dunphy Visiting Professor of Religion, Violence, and Peacebuilding at Harvard Divinity School where she teaches contemporary Islam and directs the ‘Islam in the West’ program. She is also Senior Fellow at Georgetown University’s Berkley Center, directing the ‘Islam in World Politics’ program and a visiting associate professor at the Government Department of this university.

== Works ==
=== Monographs ===
- We God's People: Christianity, Islam, and Hinduism in the World of Nations (2021)
- What is Political Islam? (2018)
- The Awakening of Muslim Democracy (2014)
- Why the West Fears Islam: An Exploration of Muslims in Liberal Democracies (2013)
- L'islam à l'épreuve de l'Occident [Islam and the West] (2013)
- Muslims in the West After 9/11: Religion, Politics and Law (2009)
- When Islam and Democracy Meet: Muslims in Europe and in the United States (2006)
- Musulmani in Occidente [Muslims in the West] (2005)
- La Méditerranée des réseaux: marchands, entrepreneurs et migrants entre l'Europe et le Maghreb [The Mediterranean of networks: merchants, entrepreneurs and migrants between Europe and the Maghreb] (2002)
- Les anonymes de la mondialisation [The anonymous of globalisation] (1999)
- Musulmans et républicains: les jeunes, l'islam et la France [Muslims and Republicans: Youth, Islam and France] (1998)
- Faut-il avoir peur de l'Islam? [Should we be afraid of Islam?] (1997)
- Etre musulman en France: associations, militants et mosquées [Being Muslim in France: associations, activists and mosques] (1994)

=== Edited books ===
- Islam, Gender, and Democracy in Comparative Perspective, with José Casanova (2017)
- The Oxford Handbook of European Islam (2015)
- Encyclopedia of Islam in the United States (2007)
- European Muslims and the Secular State, with Seán McLoughlin (2005)
- Géopolitique des Islams [Geopolitics of Islam], with Bernard Botiveau (1997)
