= Roger Ballard =

Roger Ballard may refer to:

- Roger Ballard (sociologist) (1943–2020), British sociologist
- Roger Ballard (singer-songwriter), American singer-songwriter
