= Abbey of Our Lady of Gethsemani =

American Trappist Monastery

Coordinates: 37°39′51″N 85°31′46″W

Gethsemani Abbey
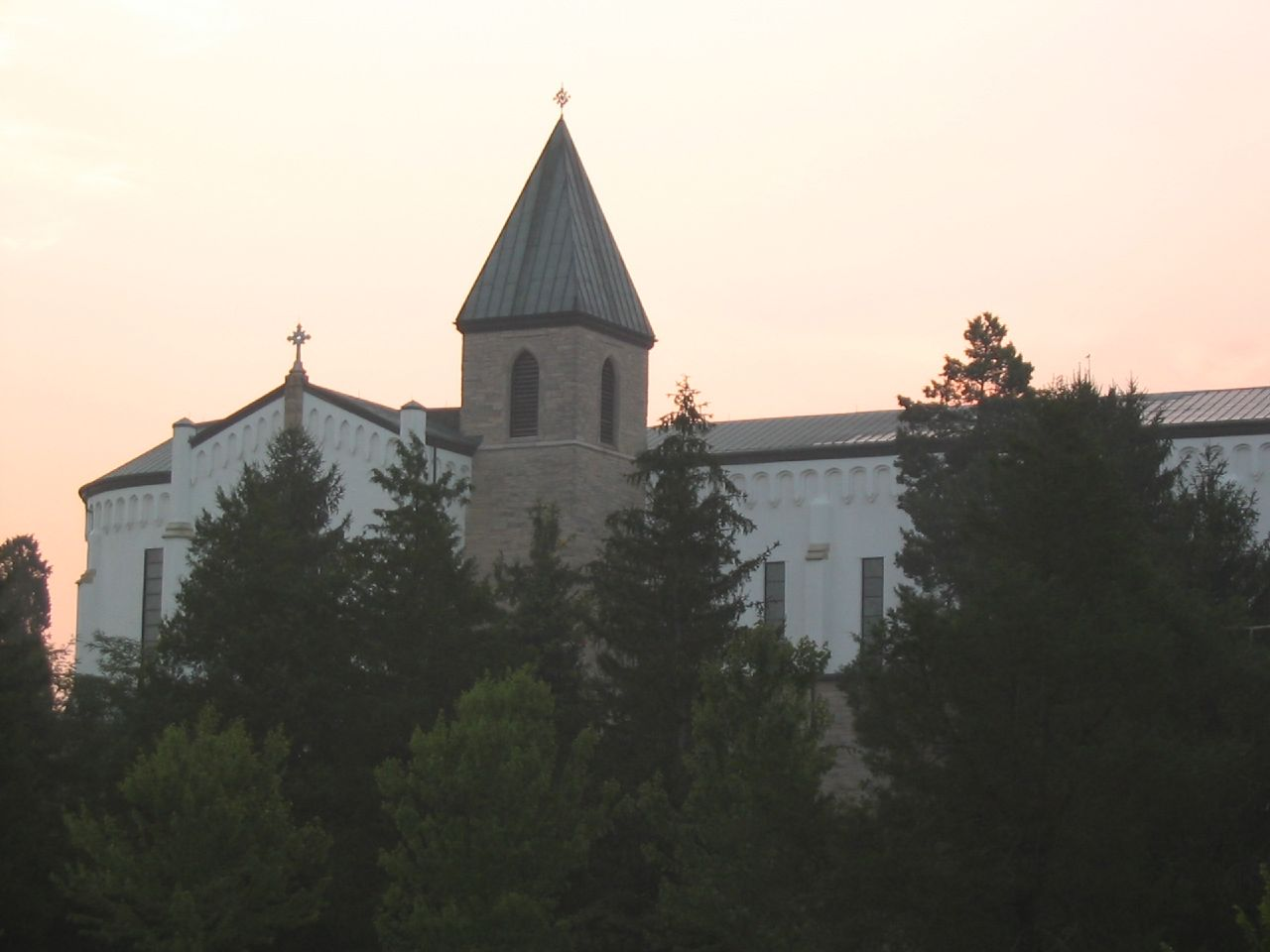
- Interactive map of Gethsemani Abbey

Monastery information
- Full name: Abbey of Our Lady of Gethsemani
- Order: Trappists
- Established: December 21, 1848
- Mother house: Melleray Abbey
- Diocese: Archdiocese of Louisville

People
- Founders: Eutropius Proust, O.C.S.O.
- Abbot: Elias Dietz, O.C.S.O.

Architecture
- Architect: William Keely
- Style: Neo-Gothic
- Groundbreaking: October 1852

Site
- Location: 3642 Monks Road, Trappist, Kentucky
- Country: United States
- Website: monks.org

The Abbey of Our Lady of Gethsemani is a Catholic monastery in the United States near Bardstown, Kentucky, in Nelson County. The abbey is part of the Order of Cistercians of the Strict Observance (Ordo Cisterciensis Strictioris Observantiae), better known as the Trappists. Founded on December 21, 1848, and raised to an abbey in 1851, Gethsemani is considered to be the motherhouse of all Trappist and Trappistine monasteries in the United States. Gethsemani is the oldest Trappist monastery in the country that is still operating, celebrating the 175th anniversary of their founding in December 2022.

Following the Rule of Saint Benedict, the Trappist monks live a contemplative life of faithful prayer and work. The monastery is situated on a working farm of 2,000 acres (810 ha). The monks support themselves and the abbey through its store, Gethsemani Farms, offering handmade fruitcake and bourbon fudge (both onsite and by mail order).

Gethsemani was the home of Trappist monk, social activist and author Thomas Merton from 1941 until his death in 1968.

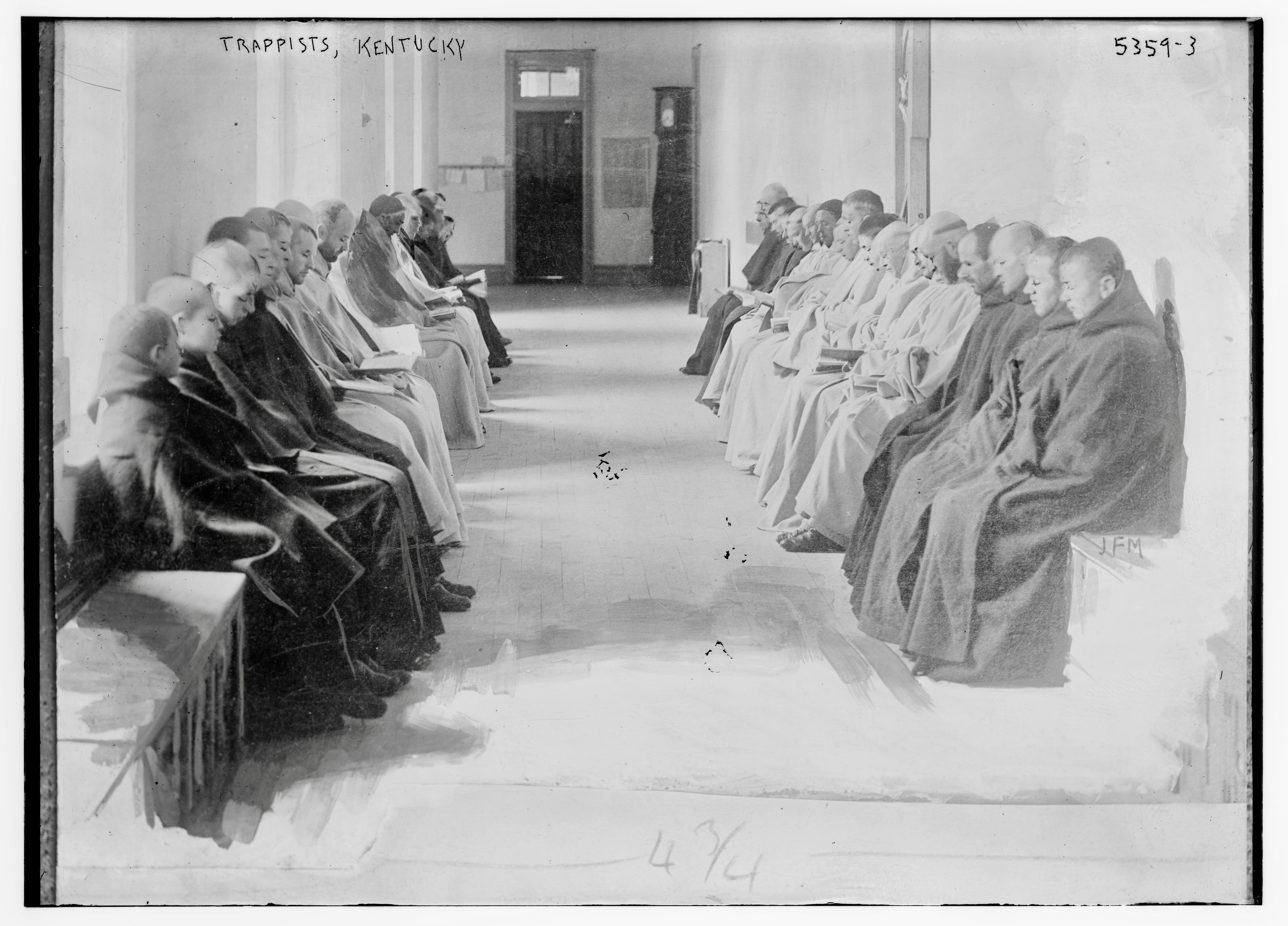
Monks at the monastery

== History ==
=== Establishment ===
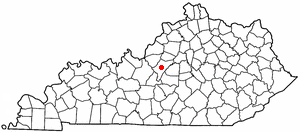
The location of Bardstown in the Commonwealth of Kentucky—in 1848, 43 Trappist monks emigrated from France to establish the Abbey of Gethsemani

In September 1805, French Trappists from the Abbey of La Valsainte in Switzerland traveled from Pennsylvania to Louisville, Kentucky. From Louisville, they traveled south to the area of Bardstown to meet with Stephen Badin, the first Catholic priest ordained in the United States. Badin invited the monks and members of their Order to make their home in the area, near Holy Cross Church. Their stay was short-lived and they left in 1809 after a season of bad flooding.

Four decades later, in 1847, Dom Maxime, abbot of the Abbey of Melleray in France, sent two monks to Kentucky to find a tract of land on which the order could build a monastery. Bishop Benedict Joseph Flaget in Louisville greeted the pair and guided them to Nelson County, to a tract of land owned by the Sisters of Loretto that was called Gethsemani where the previous community of Trappists had lived. The two monks were able to contract a deal for the land.

On 26 October 1848, 44 monks of the Abbey of Melleray left France with their leader, Eutropius Proust. It was a timely departure as France was verging toward a revolution inspired by socialism and rising secularism had made the environment hostile toward the church. One of the monks died during the voyage, and the other 43 arrived on 11 December 1848 in New Orleans, Louisiana. They journeyed up the Mississippi River on the Martha Washington, a steamboat, and arrived at Gethsemani on 21 December, celebrating Mass for Christmas a few days later.

=== Beginnings ===
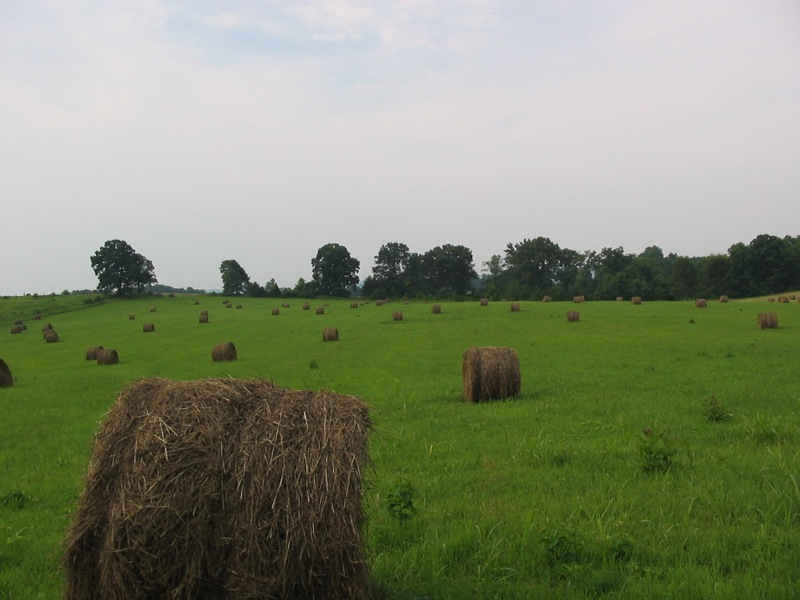
Farm fields of Gethsemani

Life at Gethsemani at this time was exceedingly harsh. Shortly after their arrival, Proust came down with pneumonia and nearly died—recovering only after being administered the Last Rites. By 1849 the fledgling community had torn down the old cabins on the property and constructed a second chapel, and soon began planning for the construction of a monastery. Proust returned to France in the summer of 1849 to raise funds for construction. At this time the Order was receiving offers from several bishops in other states that wished to have the Order move there to establish monasteries. Proust refused them all because he wanted to establish at least one monastery before expanding, and Gethsemani would be that place. So, in 1851, the grounds at Gethsemani were declared the "Proto-Abbey of the New World" and Proust became Dom Eutropius Proust—first Abbot of Gethsemani.

With Proust having been installed as abbot the previous year, plans for construction of the three-storey monastery finally began in October 1852—to be designed by the architect William Keely. It was during these pre-Civil war years that the monastery was built, modeled after the Abbey of Melleray. It was made of brick walls with timber roof supports with a rectangular abbatial church (meaning a church belonging to an abbey) constructed as well, the interior of which was made of lath and plaster in a Neo-Gothic style. The bricks were made on the work site, while the foundation was of limestone rock from Indiana. Later, windows were installed, and atop the church a large steeple was mounted. Many local members of the community helped the monks in with construction, some of them were slaves. In exchange for the hard work, Proust promised the locals free schooling for their children. In 1859 Proust resigned as abbot and returned to the Abbey of Melleray in France. At this time Gethsemani had a total of 65 monks. Proust died in 1874 while serving as abbot of the Abbey of Tre Fontane near Rome, Italy.

=== Civil War and later 19th century ===
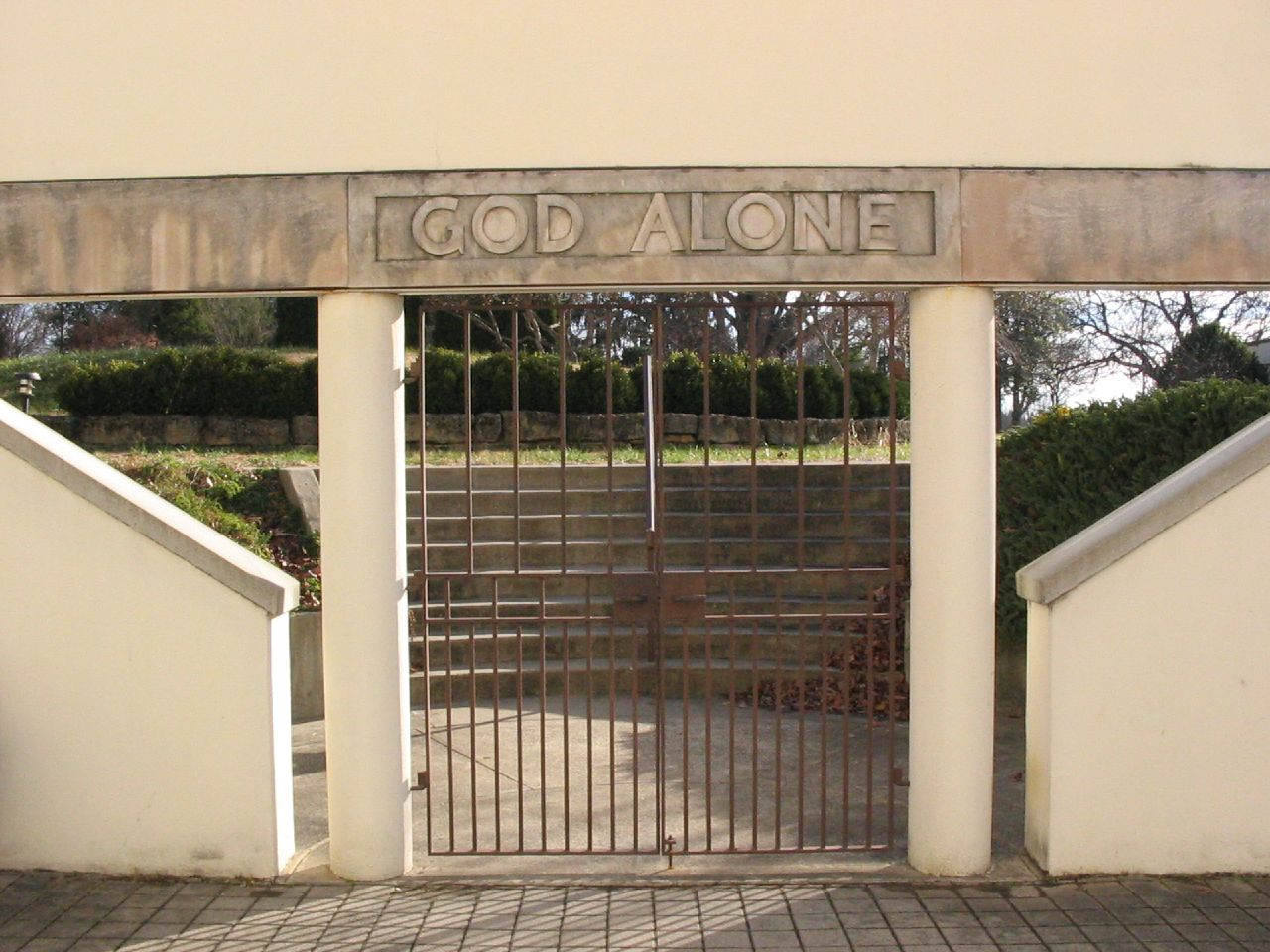
Gardens entrance gate.

Benedict Berger was installed as the next abbot, just after the American Civil War had commenced on April 19, 1861, though he had been leading the community since January of that year. Berger was known to have an astute business-sense about him and was diligent in ensuring his monks lived an austere existence—in fact, many locals viewed the monks as a strange and unhappy lot. He was equally remembered for his generosity and kindness to soldiers on both sides of the Civil War, accepting them in the abbey to provide nourishment, horses and/or distilled spirits. Berger did sympathize with the Union, however, and his monks enjoyed the protection of Union troops in the area. On May 1, 1864, the abbey opened their church in the public wing of their basilica to the general community, and France sent a priest by the name of Jerome Moyen to lead them.

On November 15, 1866, Gethsemani's abbatial church was consecrated by Archbishop Purcell of the Roman Catholic Archdiocese of Cincinnati, assisted by the bishops of Louisville and Buffalo. Present at the consecration was Bishop Spalding of Baltimore, who gave the homily. That same year Gethsemani was given control over a nearby parish, and Dom Benedict also founded a religious order for women—the Sisters of the Third Order Regular of St. Francis—who were assigned to teach at an all-girls school in Mount Olivet, Kentucky. At this time, the abbey was not bringing in many new postulants, in part due to the strict leadership of Dom Benedict. In 1878 the abbey had roughly the same number of monks as when it was founded, and none of those present were American. As a result, Gethsemani leased some of its land to local farmers to avoid closure.

In 1884 the abbey suffered a devastating blow. Their grain mill—a major source of income and nourishment—was destroyed by fire. Despite this, Gethsemani managed a very large and productive farm by this time. In 1885 the community received its first lifelong American monk, a former cowboy from Texas. The number of monks at Gethsemani, however, had dropped to 34 by the end of Dom Benedict's tenure. In ailing health, Berger retired in 1889 and was confined to the abbey's infirmary until his death in August 1891.

=== Abbot Edward Chaix-Bourbon's resignation amidst scandal ===
Dom Edward Chaix-Bourbon was the next Abbot of Gethsemani, installed on May 9, 1890; his abbatial benediction took place in September. Dom Edward applied himself to caring for the all-boys school the abbey ran on the grounds, transforming it into Gethsemani College (or Gethsemane college). The college received numerous applications, mainly from Kentucky. Abbot Edward initiated the construction of new buildings and hired Darnley Beaufort as principal of the boarding school. Beaufort claimed to be an aristocrat and an expert educator, but he was subsequently convicted of sexual abuse. The 1895 scandal remained with the monastery and its school for many years.

Abbot Edward knew about Beaufort's offenses but did not intervene for years. After the scandal was made public, he submitted his resignation at the General Chapter, but it was rejected twice. Nonetheless, he remained in France. The abbey remained without an abbot for years. After a visitation in January 1898, Dom Edmond Obrecht from La Trappe was appointed the administrator and then elected abbot in 1898.

=== Dom Obrecht's collection of manuscripts ===
Obrecht, originally from Alsace, had been at the Sorbonne before becoming a monk. In 1875 he entered La Trappe, and later served as secretary to Procurators General François-Régis Martrin-Donos (1808–1880) and Stanislaus White (1838–1911), working in Rome until 1892. From 1893 to 1897 he collected donations in Europe and in the United States for the construction of Tre Fontane Abbey in Rome. He collected medieval manuscripts (and documents from the time of the French Revolution), kept first at Western Michigan University, then transferred to their current repository at the Hill Museum & Manuscript Library.

=== Trappists as writers ===
Two Gethsemani monks of the 20th century are well known for their writing: Thomas Merton and Raymond Flanagan. Merton wrote on the spirituality of the Cistercians, while Flanagan's work was aimed at a more popular audience. Both published widely and had their books translated into several languages. Also, the Nicaraguan poet Ernesto Cardenal entered Gethsemani under the supervision of Merton.

=== Present ===
Elected to his third six-term in 2020, the current abbot is Elias Dietz.

Silence is still encouraged. The 40-odd monks who make up the community mingle with visitors and leave the monastery grounds for medical appointments and business concerning the abbey. The monastery uses hired help for some of their maintenance, construction tasks and to staff their mail-order phone center. Mass is held every weekday at 6:15 a.m., and at 10:30 a.m. on Sundays in the main chapel. There are also vespers and other services interspersed throughout most days.

== List of abbots ==
- Eutropius Proust (1848–1859)
- Benedict Berger (1861–1889)
- Edward Chaix-Bourbon (1890–1896)
- Benedict Dupont (1896–1898)
- Edmond Obrecht (1898–1935)
- Frederic Dunne (1935–1948)
- James Fox (1948–1968)
- Flavian Burns (1968–1973)
- Timothy Kelly (1973–2000)
- Damien Thompson (2000–2008)
- Elias Dietz (2008–present)

== Life at the abbey ==
=== Monastic admission ===
Admission into the abbey is a difficult process for those interested in entering monastic life. The monastery requires applicants to make several visits to Gethsemani and encourages them to look into other communities as well. Finally, before being admitted they must pass psychological testing. Once accepted, an individual spends six months as a postulant and is then given his white robe. He then spends two years as a novice monk. If the monk is then found to be competent, he is approved by a council of "fully professed" monks and spends an additional three years as a "junior professed" monk. After these three years the monk can request to take his final, solemn vows, and become a "fully professed" monk.

=== Gethsemani Farms ===
Gethsemani once sustained itself solely through donations, by growing its own foods and selling timber. Today, in keeping with the observance of the Rule of St. Benedict, the monks of Gethsemani raise money for the monastery by producing fruitcake and fudge; they also collect royalties received from sales of Thomas Merton's books. The fruitcake is made with Kentucky bourbon as well as cherries, pineapples, raisins, dates and nuts. The months of November and December are particularly busy for Gethsemani Farms, with the monks receiving and filling large orders for the holiday season.

=== Retreats ===
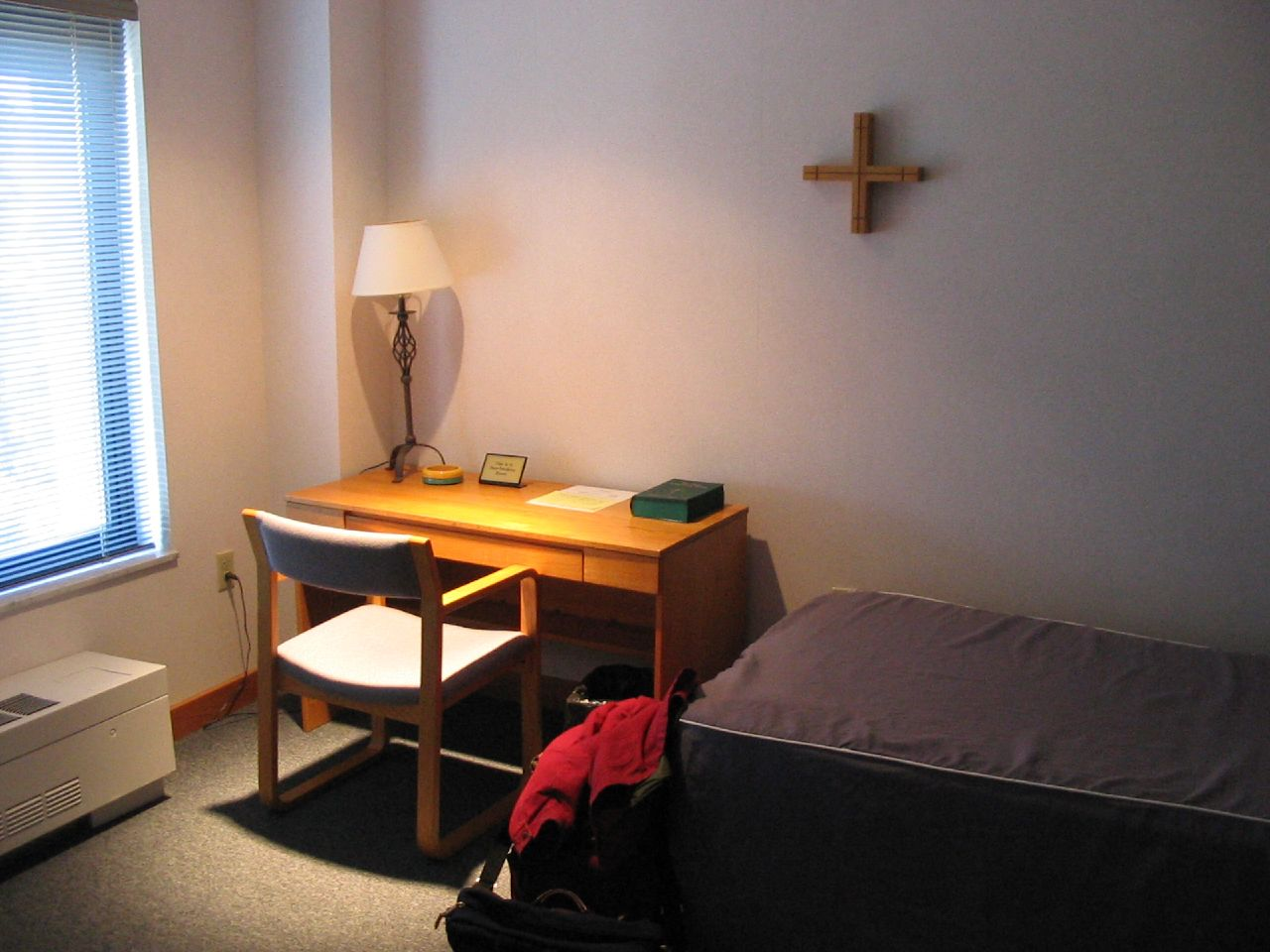
Guest quarters

The tradition of Gethsemani accepting guests is in keeping with ancient Benedictine culture. Guests have ample opportunity to roam the abbey grounds. The trails, woodlands and expansive fields are suitable for quiet walks and reflection. Gethsemani has a retreat house with 30 rooms complete with private baths and air conditioning. Both men and women are welcome. Male visitors are discouraged, and female visitors are barred, from entering the enclosure. Speaking is allowed only in designated areas.

=== Cemetery ===
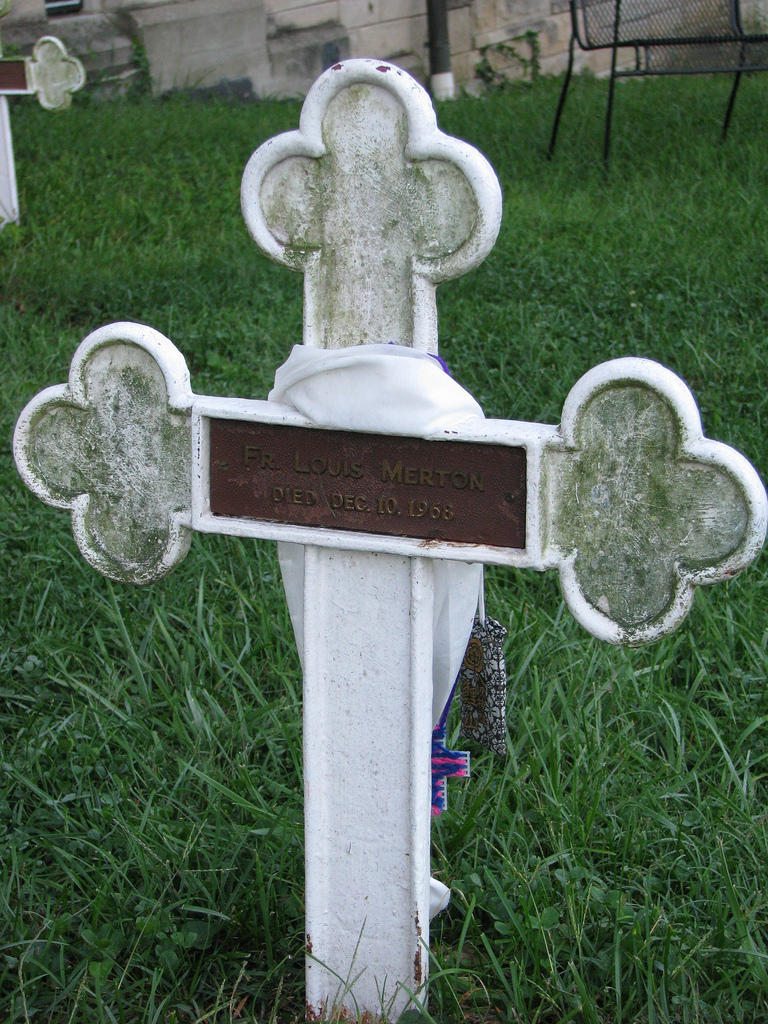
Grave of Thomas Merton

Like many other monastic graveyards, the cemetery at Gethsemani is marked by uniform crosses. It rests on a buttressed embankment and overlooks the valley and woodlands below. The monks are buried in the traditional Trappist manner, in their monastic habit and without a casket. Thomas Merton's grave is located here and it is often arrayed with various mementos left by visitors. His grave marker reads, in the same basic style as all the others there: "Fr. Louis Merton, Died Dec. 10, 1968."

== Monastic interreligious dialogue ==
=== Gethsemani Encounter I ===
For the week of July 22–27, 1996, The Abbey of Gethsemani played host to its first groundbreaking dialogue between monastics of various Catholic and Buddhist orders. Among the issues discussed were topics on prayer, meditation, work ethics, and monastic roles. According to the 14th Dalai Lama—who was present at the encounter—these discussions were important in paving the way for future dialogues between the two religions. The idea to establish such a connection between them first came about at the Parliament of the World's Religions in 1993, when Julian von Duerbeck and Wayne Teasdale asked the Monastic Interreligious Dialogue (MID) to host an interfaith dialogue between Buddhists and Catholics; MID accepted, and that morning they held a meeting at the Parliament.

Participants	Participants	Participants	Participants	Participants
Tenzin Gyatso, 14th Dalai Lama	Sr. Mary Margaret Funk	Ven. Maha Ghosananda	Pierre-François de Béthune	David Steindl-Rast
Fr. James A. Wiseman	Fr. Donald W. Mitchell	Fr. Leo Lefebure	Donald Mitchell	Fr. Joseph John Gerry

=== Gethsemani Encounter II ===
The second Gethsemani Encounter was held at the abbey during the week of April 13 to April 18, 2002.

Participants	Participants	Participants	Participants	Participants	Participants
Tenzin Gyatso, 14th Dalai Lama	John Daido Loori	Fr. Leo Lefebure	Zoketsu Norman Fischer	Joseph Goldstein	Fr. Thomas Keating
Lobsang Tenzin	Henepola Gunaratana	Fr. Columba Stewart	Sr. Mary Margaret Funk	Zenkdi Blanche Hartman	Sr. Kathy Lyzotte
Stephanie Kaza	Thubten Chodron	Fr. James Wiseman	Fr. Dan Ward	Sr. Mary Collins	Sr. Margaret Michaud
Ewert Cousins	Ajahn Sundara	Fr. Donald Grabner	Fr. William Skudlarek	Janet Cousins	Fr. Mark Delery
Fr. Joseph Wong	Fr. Kevin Hunt	Shōhaku Okumura	Fr. Thomas Ryan	Geshe Sopa	Rev. Heng Sure
Ven. Chuen Phangcham	Sr. Joan Kirby (RSCJ)	Fr. Damon Geiger	Fr. Julian von Duerbeck	Ven. Samu Sunim	Sr. Danielle Witt
Donald Mitchell	Gray Henry	Msgr. Felix Machado	Paul Gailey	Ven. Guo Yuan	Fr. Dan Ward
Kate Olson	Jim Funk	Very Rev. Thomas Baima	Sangeetha Ekambaram	Fr. Bruce Baker	Sr. Barbara McCracken

=== Gethsemani Encounter III and IV ===
Gethsemani Encounter III and IV were held in 2008 and 2015 respectively and again sponsored by the DIMMID.

== See also ==
=== Trappist abbeys in the U.S. ===
- Abbey of New Clairvaux
- Abbey of the Genesee
- Assumption Abbey
- Holy Cross Abbey, Virginia
- Mepkin Abbey
- Monastery of the Holy Spirit
- New Melleray Abbey
- Our Lady of the Mississippi Abbey
- St. Benedict's Monastery
- St. Joseph's Abbey

=== Related topics ===
- Abbey of Our Lady of the Holy Trinity
- Cîteaux Abbey
- Cistercians
- Gethsemani
- List of basilicas
- Roman Catholic Archdiocese of Louisville
- Roman Catholicism in the United States
- Trappists
