= Quigley South =

Catholic school in Chicago, Illinois, United States

Quigley Preparatory Seminary South

Location
- 7740 S. Western Ave. Chicago, Illinois; United States; 41°45′9.1″N 87°41′5.2″W

Information
- Type: Private College-Preparatory High School
- Established: 1961 (closed 1990)
- Grades: 9–12
- Enrollment: approx. 750
- Campus: Urban
- Colors: Blue, Gold
- Mascot: Spartans
- Yearbook: ΙΧΘΥΣ

Quigley Preparatory Seminary South was a Catholic high school administered by the Archdiocese of Chicago from 1961 through 1990. Quigley South was located at 7740 South Western Avenue on the South Side of Chicago. Quigley North and Quigley South were both named to honor James Edward Quigley, Archbishop of Chicago from 1903 to 1915.

== From concept to construction ==
In the 1950s, Cardinal Samuel Stritch, then Archbishop of Chicago, began planning for the second Quigley seminary to relieve overcrowding at Quigley North, but he died in Rome on May 27, 1958. At the direction of his successor Cardinal Albert Gregory Meyer, a former seminary rector and Archbishop of Milwaukee (appointed Archbishop of Chicago on September 19, 1958), Quigley Preparatory Seminary South opened in 1961, with Msgr. Martin M. Howard named its first rector.

== The 1960s ==
Cardinal Meyer dedicated the Quigley South Chapel of the Sacred Heart (so named to hearken to the original Chicago minor seminary, Cathedral College of the Sacred Heart), its 40-acre (160,000 m^{2}) campus, and new facilities for its 869 students on September 13, 1962. For a short period in the early 1960s, both Quigley campuses held joint events, including graduations, in order to instill among the students the spirit of sharing one school.

In 1966 Cardinal John Cody instituted a Chicago seminary system-wide change abolishing the Thursday day off and Saturday school day, which had for decades separated Chicago seminarians and seminary faculty from participating in Saturday social activities, while Quigley faculty voted to alter their own dress code requiring a cassock, in place of other clerical attire. Seminary policies prohibiting seminarian participation in co-educational activities and organizations were also revised in that same year. In 1968, dress codes for both Quigley seminaries requiring a suit coat and tie for students were revised to fit the seasons of the year, and the Quigley seminaries made the necessary arrangements so that Quigley students could join the National Honor Society.

== The 1970s ==
After a year-long self-study of the entire Chicago archdiocesan seminary system in 1969 assisted by Arthur B. Little and Company of Boston, Cardinal Cody in 1970 announced a new admissions policy for the Quigley seminaries, which expanded beyond Cardinal Mundelein's original requirement in 1916 that Quigley students be "educated with those who only look forward to that same great work in life, the priestly field of labor." Boys from two categories would, as of 1971, be admitted to Quigley, "(a.) ... who have indicated a desire for the priesthood and who meet the requirements of admissions, and (b.) ... who, in the judgment of parish priests, have the kind of character, ability, and temperament which might lead to the personal discovery of a vocation in the priesthood." The new policy also indicated that Quigley North and South should "emphasize the fact that they are contemporary seminaries primarily concerned with the development and encouragement of vocations to the priesthood," and that "a vigorous campaign should be begun, especially on the part of priests, to enroll qualified students."

However, Cardinal Cody's intent to maintain unity with Quigley North, as well as a focus on the development of more young men choosing the priesthood as a vocation, would be short-lived. Quigley South would go on to develop its own distinct identity on the South Side of Chicago. The two Quigleys would develop a rivalry of sorts during sporting events between the two schools, and very few, if any, joint social or ministry activities would be held between them as the years progressed. With a typical annual student body of more than 700 students, Quigley South dwarfed the enrollment of Quigley North whose own enrollment usually numbered less than 100. Reflective of the ethnic and racial diversity of Chicago, increasing numbers of Poles, African-Americans, Lithuanians, Hispanics and Irish students matriculated at Quigley South each fall.

Prayer and a rigorous curriculum remained a mainstay of Quigley, however the school would eventually offer an innovative approach to attracting and retaining its culturally diverse community. While many schools would maintain the strict dress code and policy of no facial hair and crew cuts during this period, Quigley would eschew many of these rules and allow students to sport full beards and shoulder-length hair. While formal proms were not allowed (they were called Spring Socials), many parties and concerts would indeed be hosted at Quigley. Chicago natives Chuck Panozzo, his brother John and Dennis DeYoung of Styx played at Quigley South's gym.

In 1978, after serving many years at Quigley as a faculty member, Father Jerry Kicanas was asked by Cardinal Cody to become Quigley South's new rector to replace Father James P. Keleher (now retired Bishop of Kansas City) who was tapped to become rector at Saint Mary of the Lake Seminary at Mundelein, Illinois.

== Historic visit by Pope John Paul II ==
The reemergence of the seminary as a place for young men to explore their interest in priesthood was acknowledged when Pope John Paul II visited Quigley South on October 5, 1979. The Pope had lunch with bishops in the school's gym, and an exclusive audience with students and faculty. With thousands of people waiting to see the Pope outside the school, John Paul II, along with the school's principal and John Cardinal Cody, climbed to the school's roof to see the crowd.

Pope John Paul II gave three speeches in all that day—one to the bishops of the United States, one to the sick, and one to the minor seminarians of both Quigley schools.

== The final years ==
The 1980s would bring many changes to Quigley South. A decision to integrate new technologies with the traditional academic rigors of Quigley led to the establishment of a computer lab in 1983, one of the first Chicago-area high schools to do so, complete with Apple IIe's. In 1984, faculty member Fr John Klein would replace Kicanas as the last rector of Quigley South as Kicanas moved on to become rector of the major seminary in Mundelein, and eventually seventh Bishop of the Roman Catholic Diocese of Tucson.

By December 1989, due to numerous reasons, the archdiocese announced the controversial decision to close Quigley South as of June 1990 and combine it with Quigley North into Archbishop Quigley Preparatory Seminary at the original downtown site for the 1990 Fall term. For several weeks in early 1990, Quigley students and alumni from both institutions picketed the mansion of Cardinal Joseph Bernardin and published a full-page ad in the Chicago Sun-Times. While some protesters later joined in supporting the combined school, this site was also subsequently closed on June 22, 2007. Klein had been president of the school in 1990 until his death in 1999.

The Quigley South campus was purchased for the new location of St. Rita of Cascia High School (originally located several miles north at 63rd Street and Claremont Avenue). The physical location of Quigley South appears largely the same, with some exterior modifications such as Quigley South's former varsity soccer field now the location of St. Rita's football stadium (Quigley South never had a football team).

== Miscellaneous ==
- Team name: Spartans, named for the famed Spartan Army, known as the best disciplined, best trained, and most feared military forces in the ancient world. By far, the most delicious item on the menu at Quigley South's cafeteria was a double cheeseburger called the Spartan Burger.
- School motto: Ora et Labora, Latin for "pray and work".
- Yearbook name: ΙΧΘΥΣ, an acronym formed from the first letters of several ancient Greek words meaning "Jesus: Messiah, Son of God, Savior".
- Newspaper name: Profile
- The original team name was "Rebels". It was changed to avoid references to the Confederate States of America and a pro-slavery stance.

== Notable alumni ==
=== Living bishops ===
- Wilton D. Gregory, (QS '65) Archbishop of Washington, former president of the United States Conference of Catholic Bishops
- Jerome Edward Listecki, (QS '67) Archbishop of Milwaukee
- Edward K. Braxton, (QS '62) Bishop Emeritus of Belleville
- Thomas John Paprocki, (QS '70) Bishop of Springfield
- Ronald A. Hicks (QS ‘85) Bishop of Joliet

=== Other alumni ===
- Don Bies, (QS, '79) Special Effects Veteran and R2-D2 Operator
- Doug Bruno, head coach of DePaul Blue Demons women's basketball, assistant coach of 2012 and 2016 U.S. Olympic teams.
- Mike Harper, ('76) NBA basketball player
- Paul Hickey, (QS '79) author, Plight of the Bayou Coyote
- Rob Jeter, (QS '87) head basketball coach at Western Illinois
- Andrew Kloak, (QS '84) author, Working the Glass: A Novel
- Leo D. Lefebure, Matteo Ricci SJ chair of theology at Georgetown University
- Harry Lennix, (QS '82) noted Actor
- Antonio Munoz, (QS '82) Illinois State Senator
- Martin Sandoval, (QS '82) Illinois State Senator
- Elgie R. Sims Jr., (QS '88) Illinois State Senator
- William F. Tate IV, (QS '79) social scientist and university president

== Athletics ==
The Quigley South Spartans wore blue-and-gold colors, and competed in baseball, basketball, soccer, cross-country, wrestling, track, swimming, tennis, and golf.
