= Global Governance =

Journal

Global Governance: A Review of Multilateralism and International Organizations
- Discipline: International relations
- Language: English
- Edited by: Tom Farer; Timothy D. Sisk

Publication details
- History: 1995–present
- Publisher: Brill Publishers (United States)
- Frequency: Quarterly
- Impact factor: 1.016 (2014)

Standard abbreviations
- ISO 4: Glob. Gov.

Indexing
- ISSN: 1075-2846 (print); 1942-6720 (web)
- JSTOR: globgove
- OCLC no.: 300238667

Links
- Journal homepage

Global Governance: A Review of Multilateralism and International Organizations is an academic quarterly journal. It was published by Lynne Rienner Publishers in the past, and is now published by Brill Publishers. It is published in association with the Academic Council of the United Nations System (ACUNS). According to the Journal Citation Reports, the journal has a 2014 impact factor of 1.016, ranking it 28th out of 85 journals in the category "International Relations".

== See also ==
- List of international relations journals
