= Mike Harper (basketball) =

American basketball player (born 1957)

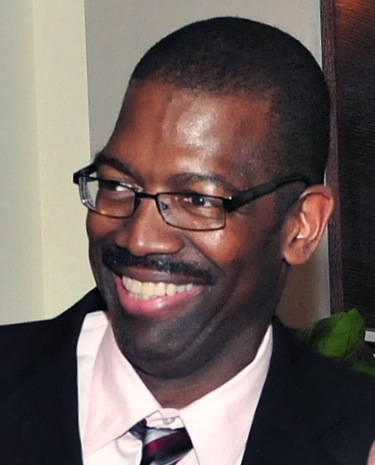
- Harper in 2013

Personal information
- Born: December 9, 1957 (age 68) Chicago, Illinois, U.S.
- Listed height: 6 ft 10 in (2.08 m)
- Listed weight: 195 lb (88 kg)

Career information
- High school: Quigley South (Chicago, Illinois)
- College: North Park (1976–1980)
- NBA draft: 1980: 3rd round, 56th overall pick
- Drafted by: Portland Trail Blazers
- Playing career: 1980–1988
- Position: Power forward
- Number: 32

Career history
- 1980–1982: Portland Trail Blazers
- 1982–1983: Pallacanestro Trieste
- 1983–1984: Fulgor Libertas Forlì
- 1984–1986: Olympique Antibes
- 1986–1988: CB Canarias

Career highlights
- 2× First-team Division III All-American (1979, 1980); 3× NCAA Division III champion (1978–1980)
- Stats at NBA.com
- Stats at Basketball Reference

Michael Edward Harper (born December 9, 1957) is an American former professional basketball player.

== Biography ==
Harper was raised Catholic and attended Chicago's Quigley South High School, considering a path to the priesthood. Instead, he went on to play college basketball at North Park University, where he led teams to three consecutive NCAA Division III national basketball championships.

Harper played for the Portland Trail Blazers of the National Basketball Association (NBA) from 1980 to 1982. He played college basketball for the North Park Vikings.

== Personal life ==
Following his basketball career, Harper became an insurance agent. He also serves as a board member for the Oregon Liquor Control Commission.

== Career statistics ==
Legend
GP	Games played	GS	Games started	MPG	Minutes per game
FG%	Field goal percentage	3P%	3-point field goal percentage	FT%	Free throw percentage
RPG	Rebounds per game	APG	Assists per game	SPG	Steals per game
BPG	Blocks per game	PPG	Points per game	**Bold**	Career high

=== NBA ===
==== Regular season ====
Year	Team	GP	GS	MPG	FG%	3P%	FT%	RPG	APG	SPG	BPG	PPG
1980–81	Portland	55		8.4	.412	.000	.435	1.7	.3	.4	.4	2.7
1981–82	Portland	**68**	38	**21.1**	**.497**	.000	**.627**	**5.0**	**.8**	**.8**	**1.2**	**6.8**
Career		123	38	15.4	.474	.000	.559	3.5	.6	.6	.8	5.0

==== Playoffs ====
Year	Team	GP	MPG	FG%	3P%	FT%	RPG	APG	SPG	BPG	PPG
1981	Portland	1	6.0	1.000	–	1.000	1.0	.0	.0	.0	3.0
