= Darnley Beaufort =

Principal of Gethsemane College

"Lord" Darnley Beaufort was the alias used by the man serving as principal of Gethsemane College, a school operated by the Abbey of Our Lady of Gethsemane in Kentucky, from 1893 to 1895. He was convicted of "gross immorality" with students in 1896, causing a scandal that damaged the Abbey's reputation for decades.

"Beaufort" was natively fluent in four languages (English, German, French, and Italian), wore the clothes expected of a member of England's upper class, and appeared to be highly educated. He arrived in Kentucky in 1892, claiming that he was a recent convert to Catholicism, that his wife had recently abandoned him and that his only child, a 12-year-old boy, had recently died. He claimed that the boy's dying wish had been for his father to spend his vast fortune in helping poor children. He lavished gifts on children in Nelson County, Kentucky.

Beaufort was placed in charge of the college shortly after arriving. Complaints about his conduct with students and the Abbey's funds followed soon thereafter, prompting the abbott to publish a lengthy letter in his defense. By October 1894, the New York Times reported that "Beaufort" was an assumed and fraudulent identity. Beaufort's true name was Cornelius (or Corneille) Betz; he was a native of Bourscheid, Luxembourg born in 1858. He was raised near Beaufort Castle but was not related to the Beaufort family. He adopted the name sometime around 1890 while operating confidence schemes in England and in Switzerland.

In December 1894, newspapers in Chicago reported that "Beaufort" was mistreating students; nonetheless, he remained employed as principal at Gethsemane College. When the Abbey discovered a substantial financial shortage in August 1895, however, "Beaufort" was terminated as principal of Gethsemane College. Allegations that he sexually abused boys at the school followed soon thereafter. Beaufort was charged with six counts of "gross immorality" with boys in his care, representing acts with six different students. He was convicted of the first count on April 12, 1896, and sentenced to 30 days in jail and a $200 fine. He was convicted of the second charge one week later and fined one cent. The Nelson County prosecutor declined to pursue the remaining four charges. Beaufort remained in Kentucky until February 1898.

By 1910, "Darnley Beaufort" had reverted to the use of his birth name, Cornelius Betz. He died in Mobile, Alabama on September 1, 1930.
