= Leo D. Lefebure =

American Catholic priest (born 1952)

The Reverend Leo Lefebure

Personal details
- Born: November 20, 1952 (age 73)
- Denomination: Roman Catholic
- Residence: Washington, D.C.
- Occupation: Priest, university professor, author
- Education: The University of Chicago; St. Mary of the Lake Seminary; Niles College Seminary

Leo Dennis Lefebure (born November 20, 1952) is an American Catholic priest of the Archdiocese of Chicago, university professor, and author. He is the inaugural Matteo Ricci S. J. Chair of Theology at Georgetown University. He is president of the American Theological Society.

== Early life and education ==
Lefebure was born and raised in Chicago, Illinois, where he attended Quigley Preparatory Seminary South, a Catholic high school, where he was associate editor of the Profile, its newspaper. He earned a B.A. in Philosophy summa cum laude from Niles College Seminary. His S.T.B. (Bachelor of Sacred Theology, 1976), S.T.L. (Licentiate of Sacred Theology) and M.Div. (1978), all summa cum laude, were from St. Mary of the Lake Seminary in Mundelein, Illinois. In 1987 he completed his Ph.D. in Christian Theology with Distinction at The University of Chicago, Toward a Contemporary Wisdom Christology: A Study of Karl Rahner and Norman Pittenger. Later he published it as his first book.

== Academic work and awards ==
=== Contributions on interreligious dialogue ===
Lefebure's early scholarship focused on Wisdom Christology (interpreting Jesus Christ in light of personified Wisdom in the Jewish tradition). He ended his first book, based on his dissertation, with suggestions on how the biblical wisdom tradition could inform interreligious relations. To explore this hypothesis in relation to Mahayana Buddhism, he published a book of meditations on the Christian scriptures in dialogue with Buddhist perspectives: Life Transformed. He also traveled to Kyoto Japan, through a junior scholars grant funded by the Association of Theological Schools in the United States and Canada. Masao Abe guided him into Buddhist-Christian dialogue, which led to his 1993 book, The Buddha and the Christ. He then turned to the problem of religion and violence, studying the work of René Girard and publishing Revelation, the Religions, and Violence in 2000, which won the 2001 Pax Christi USA Book Award. He later wrote a Christian commentary on the wisdom sayings of the Buddha in dialogue with the biblical and later Christian wisdom traditions: The Path of Wisdom: A Christian Commentary on the Dhammapada, co-authored with Peter Feldmeier. His more recent works deal with the hermeneutics of religious classics and the history of relationships between the Catholic Church and other religions in the U.S.

- Buddhist-Christian dialogue. In light of his publications on Buddhist-Christian dialogue, the Board of Monastic Interreligious Dialogue invited him to serve as an advisor; in that capacity he participated in the first Gethsemani Encounter in 1996. This involved the Dalai Lama and Buddhist and Catholic monastics from around the world at Abbey of Our Lady of Gethsemani, home to Thomas Merton, and he is listed at this link as a participant. He also attended the second Gethsemani Encounter in 2002. He has also engaged important ideas on Buddhist-Catholic dialogue and climate change.
- Jewish-Catholic dialogue. Lefebure grew up in an encouraging environment for such dialogue, meeting a Rabbi and visiting a synagogue in high school. He studied at the Divinity School of the University of Chicago with Professor Jon D. Levenson and Rabbi Arnold Jacob Wolf. He continued by engaging with the work of Daniel Boyarin, Rabbi Herman Schaalman, and many others. Lefebure co-chaired a Jewish-Catholic dialogue forum in Washington, DC, with Rabbi Joshua Haberman from 2005 until the Rabbi's death in 2017.
- Muslim-Christian dialogue. In 1999 Lefebure became a member of the Dialogue of Catholics and Muslims in the Midwest, co-sponsored by the USCCB Committee on Ecumenical and Interreligious Dialogue and the Islamic Society of North America. He was a major contributor to the statement published by this dialogue in 2006: Revelation in Catholic and Muslim Perspectives. After the attacks of 9/11/2001, he became more involved in dialogue with Muslims in the New York City area, including a conference on violence sponsored by the New Jersey Christian-Muslim Project and dialogue with members of the Mid-Hudson Islamic Association; he was a member of the Mid-Atlantic Dialogue of Catholics and Muslims from 2002 until 2005. Between 2006 and 2013 he participated in three international symposia in Istanbul sponsored by the Istanbul Foundation for Religion and Culture, where he presented papers discussing the theology of Bediuzzaman Said Nursi and various Christian leaders. In 2014 the Istanbul Foundation for Religion and Culture presented him its Award for Outstanding and Significant Contribution to Nursi Studies.
- Assyrian Church of the East-Catholic dialogue. His major involvement with Christian ecumenism has been with the Assyrian Church of the East. After Pope John Paul II and Mar Dinkha IV signed the Common Christological Declaration Between the Catholic Church and the Assyrian Church of the East in 1994, Lefebure, as dean of the Ecclesiastical Faculty of Theology at the University of Saint Mary of the Lake, supervised the preparation of future bishops for the Church of the East. This prepared the way for theologians working toward full communion between the Assyrian Church of the East and the Roman Catholic Church to send the Common Statement on the Sacramental Life to Pope Francis in 2017.

He is Trustee Emeritus, Council for a Parliament of the World's Religions. He served as president of the Society for Buddhist-Christian Studies from 2019 to 2021, and is the Society's current past president.

=== Books ===
- Leo D. Lefebure, with a foreword by Peter C. Phan, Transforming Interreligious Relations: Catholic Responses to Religious Pluralism in the United States (Maryknoll: Orbis Books, 2021). First place Catholic Media Association award for Ecumenism and Interfaith Relations.
- Leo D. Lefebure, True and Holy: Christian Scripture and Other Religions (Maryknoll, NY: Orbis Books, 2020). Catholic Press Association 2015 first prize, Academic Books on Scripture. French translation by Agnès de Dreuzy: Vrai et Saint: L’Ecriture chrétienne et autres religions. Berlin: LIT Verlag, 2017.
- Leo D. Lefebure and Peter Feldmeier, The Path of Wisdom: A Christian Commentary on the Dhammapada. Series: Christian Commentaries on Non-Christian Sacred Texts, Catherine Cornille, editor. Leuven, Belgium: Peeters and Grand Rapids, MI: Eerdmans, 2011. 2011, Frederick J. Streng Book of the Year, Society for Buddhist-Christian Studies.
- Leo D. Lefebure, Revelation, the Religions, and Violence (Maryknoll, NY: Orbis Books, 2000). Pax Christi U.S.A. 2001 book award. Translated into Indonesian: Penyataan Allah, Agama, dan Kekerasan. Trans. Bambang Subandrijo (Jakarta, Indonesia: PT BPK Gunung Mulia, 2003).
- Leo D. Lefebure, The Buddha and the Christ: Explorations in Buddhist-Christian Dialogue (Maryknoll, NY: Orbis Books, 1993).
- Leo D. Lefebure, Life Transformed: Meditations on the Christian Scriptures in Light of Buddhist Perspectives (Chicago: ACTA Publications, 1989).
- Leo D. Lefebure, Toward a Contemporary Wisdom Christology: A Study of Karl Rahner and Norman Pittenger (Lanham, MD: University Press of America, 1988). Revision of doctoral dissertation directed by David Tracy, accepted with distinction.

=== Edited books ===
- Leo D. Lefebure, editor. Theology without Borders: Essays in Honor of Peter C. Phan. (Washington, DC: Georgetown University Press, 2022).
- Leo D. Lefebure, editor. Religion, Authority, and the State: From Constantine to the Contemporary World. (New York: Palgrave Macmillan, 2016).

=== Fellowships ===
His fellowships, some of which are ongoing, include:

- Faculty Fellow at the Berkley Center for Religion, Peace, and World Affairs at Georgetown University since 2019.
- In 2019 he was a Long Room Hub Fellow at Trinity College Dublin.
- He has been a Research Fellow at the Chinese University of Hong Kong since 2010, and he is on the Advisory Committee of the editorial board for the Hong Kong Journal of Catholic Studies.
- Divinity School, University of Chicago: Senior Fellow, Martin E. Marty Center for the Study of Religion, 1998–99; Junior Fellow, Institute for the Advanced Study of Religion, 1986–87; University of Chicago Fellow, 1986–87.

=== Awards ===
- 2021 Catholic Media Association First Place Book Award for Ecumenism and Interfaith Studies. Transforming Interreligious Relations.
- 2015 Catholic Press Association First Place Book Award for Academic Studies of Scripture. True and Holy.
- 2011 Frederick J. Streng Book of the Year Award from the Society for Buddhist-Christian Studies (with co-author Peter Feldmeier). The Path of Wisdom: A Christian Commentary on the Dhammapada.
- 2001 Pax Christi USA Book Award. Revelation, the Religions, and Violence.
- 2014 Outstanding and Significant Contribution to Nursi Studies, Istanbul Foundation for Science and Culture.
