= Raymond Flanagan =

Raymond Joseph David Stanislaus Flanagan, OCSO (November 29, 1903 - June 3, 1990) was a Catholic priest and Trappist monk.

== Biography ==
He was born and raised in an Irish-Catholic family in Roxbury, Massachusetts. He had nine siblings. Two of his brothers also became priests and two of his sisters became nuns. Joseph entered the Society of Jesus as a high school senior and was ordained a priest on 22 July 1933. As a Jesuit, he gave many retreats and coached the debating team at College of the Holy Cross in Worcester. He did his Tertianship in Port Townsend in 1934/1935 and soon after (1936) transferred to the Trappist Abbey of Gethsemani; he made solemn vows there as Father Raymond on 5 April 1942.

Flanagan was one of two famous author-monks living in Gethsemani Abbey; the other was Thomas Merton. The monks corresponded frequently, and Merton even wrote limericks about his confrere Fr. Raymond.

Fr. Raymond was buried in the Gethsemani cemetery.

== Writings (selection) ==
Flanagan's "publications were characterized by a hard-hitting, vigorous Catholic piety that accentuated American family values, fidelity to Catholic traditions, the beauty of religious vocations, anti-Communism, and the athletic asceticism he associated with the first Cistercians." Almost all of his books were translated into one or more languages, many were re-issued, and some are still in print today. His book on the founders of Cîteaux Abbey (Saints Robert, Alberic, and Stephen) was titled Three Religious Rebels; it is particularly popular among novices learning about the history of the Cistercian Order. In general, Flanagan's books appealed to readers fascinated by the austerities of life in a Trappist monastery. Regarding a 1949 book (the fourth in the series "Saga of Cîteaux"), his publisher P. J. Kenedy ran an advertisement in the New York Times that read: "you cannot know the Trappist monks until you have read Burnt Out Incense, History of the Monastery of Gethsemani in Kentucky."

The Man who Got Even with God is one of Flanagan's most widely-read books. It is about Brother Mary Joachim Hanning, a wild cowboy who became a Cistercian (Trappist) monk in Kentucky. As a hot-tempered young man, Hanning took revenge on his father by burning down a barn full of his father's freshly cut tobacco. He then ran away and led the life of a wandering cowboy for years. He eventually returned home and reconciled with his family, later converting to a pious Catholic life after his mother died. John decided to “get even with God” by following a desire he had held in secret for years: to enter the novitiate at Gethsemani Abbey. The Mark Twain Quarterly called this work of historical fiction "A 'must' book for all who take their religion seriously."

The book Spiritual Secrets of a Trappist Monk, originally published as You in 1957, was re-issued by Sophia Institute Press in 2000. It is one of Flanagan's most popular non-fiction books, devoted to showing that "who you are in Christ is much greater than you think", as reviewer Regis Jordan wrote. In it, Fr. Raymond "gives the keys to unlock," continued Jordan, "the mysteries of pain and of success and failure. In a startling way, he even discloses the mysteries of the future itself."

The following list covers Flanagan's books. He also wrote dozens of pamphlets on subjects like the perils of communism (Trappists, the Reds and You, 1949), the beauty of religious vocations, and how to make homes into a Catholic environment. He also wrote several for men serving in the military and for their families (For Your Own Defense. A Booklet for Catholics in the Service, 1941).

=== Monographs ===
- The Man who Got Even with God. The Life of an American Trappist. Milwaukee 1941, OCLC 1023825096.
- Three Religious Rebels. The Forefathers of the Trappists. Boston 1944.
- The Less Traveled Road. A Memoir of Dom Mary Frederic Dunne, O.C.S.O., First American Trappist Abbot. Milwaukee 1953, OCLC 66054420.
- God, a Woman, and the Way. Milwaukee 1955, OCLC 255302313.
- God Goes to Murderer's Row. Dublin 1956, OCLC 1049557193.
- These Women Walked with God. Dublin 1958, OCLC 222049936.
- This is Your Tomorrow and Today. Milwaukee, 1959.
- Burnt Out Incense. New York 1949, OCLC 213156.
- Relax and Rejoice, for the Hand on the Tiller is Firm. Pasay City, Philippines 1968.
- The Family that Overtook Christ. Boston 1986, ISBN 0-8198-2626-X.

== Secondary sources ==
- Alkuin Schachenmayr: The Work of Fr. Raymond Flanagan, OCSO, Author of Historical Novels, Devotional Books, and Pamphlets. Cistercian Studies Quarterly 56.1 (2021), pp. 77–95.
