= José Casanova (sociologist) =

American sociologist of religion (born 1951)

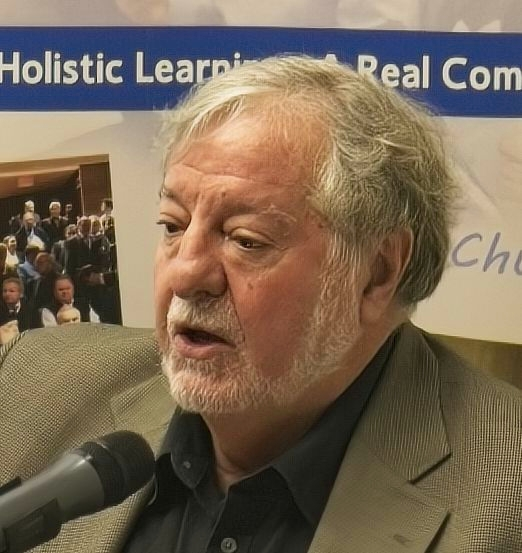
- Born: 1951 (age 74–75); Zaragoza, Spain

Academic background
- Education: Seminario Metropolitano; University of Innsbruck; The New School for Social Research
- Thesis: The Opus Dei Ethic and the Modernization of Spain (1982)

Academic work
- Discipline: Sociology
- Sub-discipline: Sociology of religion
- Institutions: Georgetown University

José Casanova (born 1951) is a sociologist of religion whose research focuses on globalization, religions, and secularization. He is a professor at Georgetown University and senior fellow at the Berkley Center for Religion, Peace, and World Affairs.

== Career ==
Casanova holds a Bachelor of Arts degree in philosophy from the Seminario Metropolitano, a Master of Arts degree from the University of Innsbruck in theology, and Master of Arts and Doctor of Philosophy degrees in sociology from the New School for Social Research. During 2017 he was the Kluge Chair in Countries and Cultures of the North at the US Library of Congress' John W. Kluge Center.

His work Public Religions in the Modern World (University of Chicago Press, 1994) has been translated into several languages, including Japanese, Arabic, and Turkish.

In 2012, Casanova was awarded the Theology Prize from the Salzburger Hochschulwochen in recognition of his life-long achievement in the field of theology.

== Publications ==
- Islam, Gender, and Democracy in Comparative Perspective, with Jocelyne Cesari (2017)
- The Jesuits and Globalization: Historical Legacies and Contemporary Challenges, with Thomas F. Banchoff (2016)
- Geopolítica de la Santa Sede (2013)
- Public Religions in the Modern World (1994)
