= Paul Elie =

American writer and editor

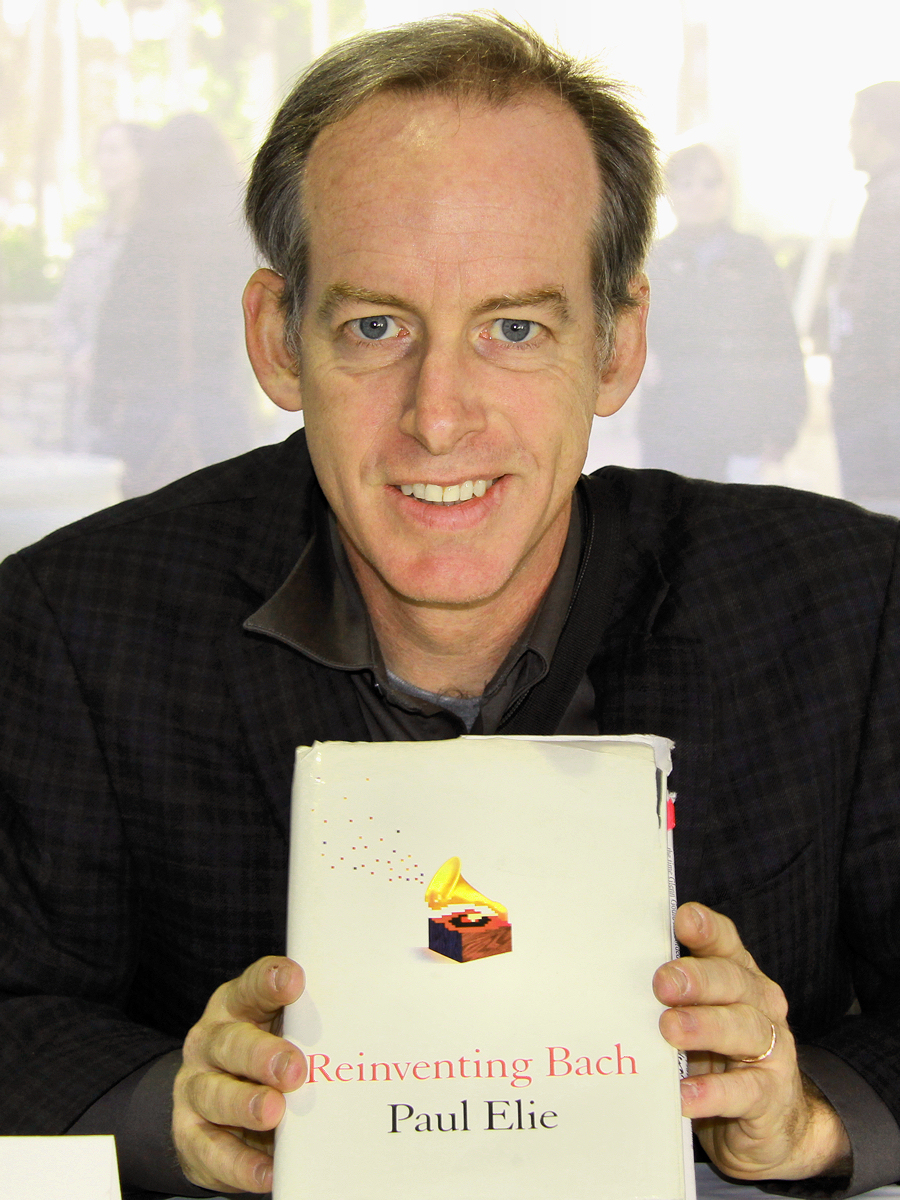
Paul Elie at the 2012 Texas Book Festival

Paul Elie (born 1965) is an American writer and editor.

== Life and works ==
He holds a Bachelor of Arts from Fordham University and a Master of Fine Arts from Columbia University.

His biography on Thomas Merton, Flannery O'Connor, Walker Percy, and Dorothy Day, The Life You Save May Be Your Own: An American Pilgrimage, was awarded the PEN/Martha Albrand Award for First Nonfiction in 2004, and received National Book Critics Circle Award nomination. He became an editor at Farrar, Straus and Giroux in 1992 and worked there for over two decades. He is currently a fellow at the Berkley Center for Religion, Peace, and World Affairs at Georgetown University.

He is a long-time contributor to the American Catholic journal Commonweal. Don Brophy, managing editor for the Catholic book publisher Paulist Press, includes The Life You Save May Be Your Own in his 2007 book One Hundred Great Catholic Books from the Early Centuries to the Present.

Reinventing Bach was a finalist for the 2012 National Book Critics Circle Award in the Criticism category. He wrote the afterword for 13 Ways of Looking at the Death Penalty by Mario Marazziti, published by Seven Stories Press in March 2015.

He has three sons Leo, Pietro and Milo with his wife, Lenora.

== Works ==
- A Tremor of Bliss: Contemporary Writing on the Saints, editor, nonfiction (New York: Harcourt, 1994). ISBN 9780151001019
- The Life You Save May Be Your Own: An American Pilgrimage, biography (New York: Farrar, Straus and Giroux, 2003). ISBN 9780374256807
- Reinventing Bach, nonfiction (New York: Farrar, Straus and Giroux, 2012). ISBN 9781908526410
- The Last Supper: Art, Faith, Sex, and Controversy in the 1980s, nonfiction (New York: Farrar, Straus and Giroux, 2025). ISBN 9780374718299
