= Seán McLoughlin (anthropologist) =

Seán M. McLoughlin
- Born: 1969 (age 56–57)

Academic background
- Education: University of Manchester
- Thesis: 'Breaking in to Bounded Britain': Discrepant Representations of Belonging and Muslims in Bradford (1997)
- Doctoral advisor: Roger Ballard

Academic work
- Institutions: University of Leeds

Seán M. McLoughlin (born 1969) is a cultural anthropologist and Professor of the Anthropology of Islam at the University of Leeds. His works use field research, in-depth interviews and documentary analysis to explore the dynamics of Islam and Muslim cultures in contexts of contemporary migration, diaspora and transnationalism. He works mainly with South Asian heritage Muslim communities in the UK, especially British Pakistanis and Kashmiris in the Northern England. McLoughlin is a member of the Sociology of religion Study Group, British Sociological Association.

== Biography ==
During the 1990s, McLoughlin completed a Bachelor's degree in Theology and Religious studies (1990), a Master's degree in Middle Eastern studies (1993) and a PhD in Social anthropology (1997), all at the University of Manchester. From 1992 to 1996, he taught as an hourly-paid lecturer in Islamic studies at Manchester Polytechnic. In 1996, he was a temporary lecturer in Comparative religion at the University of Manchester. In 1997, he secured a post as Lecturer in World Religions at Liverpool Hope University College. Since the late 1990s, he has been studying British Muslims’ experiences of the Hajj.

Since 2000, he has taught Islamic Studies at Leeds. McLoughlin was promoted to Senior lecturer in 2005 and to Professor in 2017. In 2019, he wrote the first independent report into the British Hajj industry.

== Publications ==
- Representing Muslims: Religion, Ethnicity and the Politics of Identity (2002)
- European Muslims and the Secular State, with Jocelyne Cesari (2005)
- World Religions: An Illustrated Guide (2007)
- Diasporas: Concepts, Intersections, Identities, with Kim Knott (2013)
- Writing the City in British Asian Diasporas, with William Gould, Ananya Jahanara Kabir, and Emma Tomalin (2014)
