= Virinder Kalra =

British sociologist

Virinder Singh Kalra

Academic background
- Education: University of Manchester
- Thesis: From Textile Mills to Taxi-Ranks: Experiences of Labour Amongst Mirpuris/(Azad) Kashmiris in Oldham (1997)
- Doctoral advisor: Roger Ballard

Academic work
- Institutions: University of Warwick
- Doctoral students: Tim Winter

Virinder Singh Kalra (born March 1967) is an Indian-British sociologist and Professor at the University of Warwick whose research interests include Gramscianism, popular culture, South Asian diaspora and racism in the United Kingdom. He was a senior lecturer and then Professor in Sociology at the University of Manchester.

== Publications ==
- From Textile Mills to Taxi Ranks (2000)
- Diaspora and Hybridity (2005)
- A Postcolonial People (2006)
- Pakistani Diasporas: Culture, Conflict, and Change (2008)
- Sacred and Secular Musics: A Postcolonial Approach (2014)
- State of Subversion: Radical Politics in Punjab in the 20th Century (2016)
- Beyond Religion in India and Pakistan: Gender and Caste, Borders and Boundaries (2019)
