= Academic Council on the United Nations System =

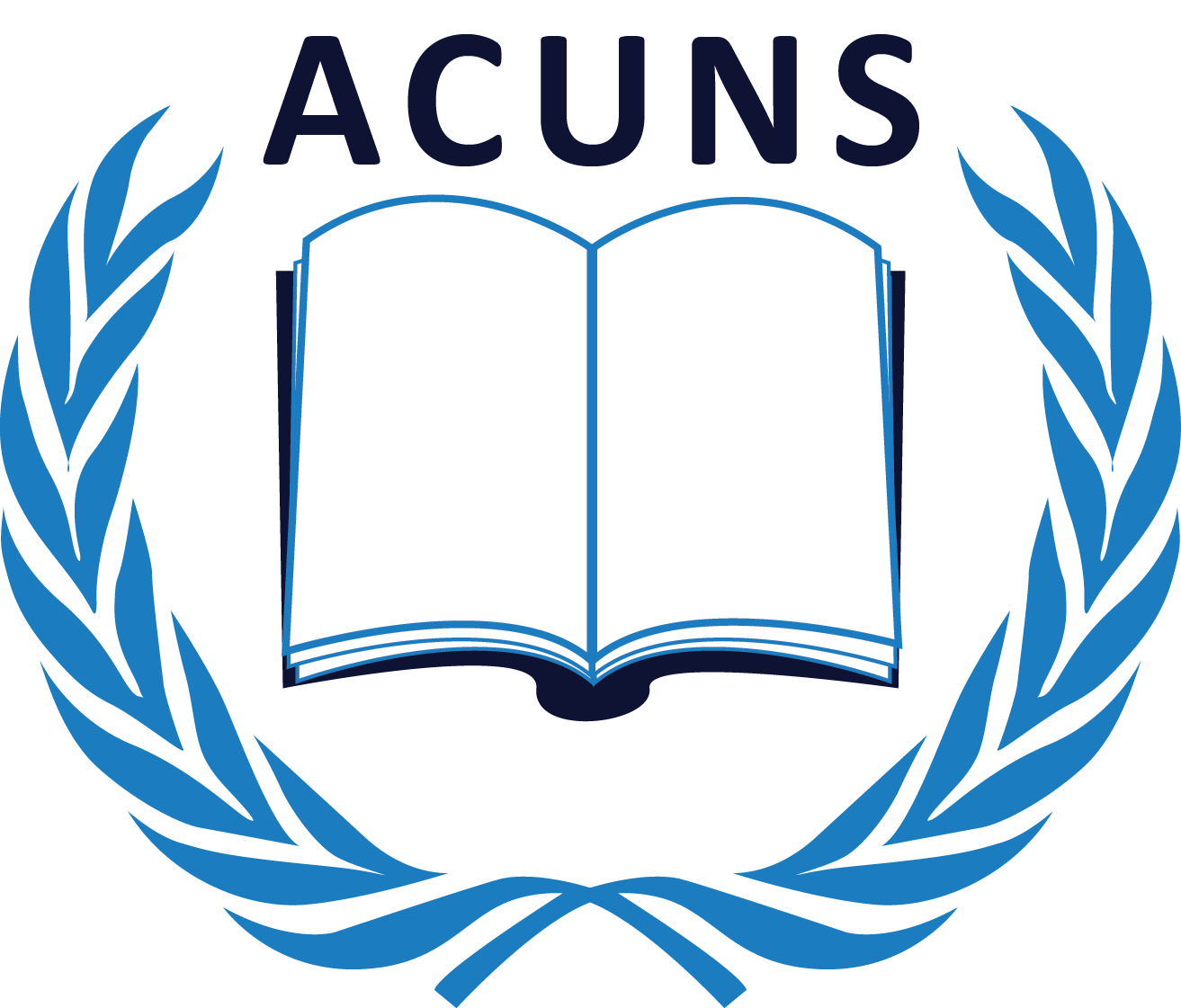
- Abbreviation: ACUNS
- Formation: June, 1987
- Type: Professional association
- Legal status: Active
- Headquarters: New York, U.S.
- Parent organization: United Nations
- Website: acuns.org

The Academic Council on the United Nations System (ACUNS) is a professional association of scholars, practitioners, institutions, and individuals active in the work and study of the UN. ACUNS stimulates and supports dialogue and research about issues of global concern and international cooperation.

== Purpose ==
ACUNS unites people engaged in research, writing, teaching, and policy practice related to the United Nations system, in order to better understand and address the most pressing global issues of our time. The United Nations was founded in 1945 to “save succeeding generations from the scourge of war.” Today, in addition to war, climate change, pandemic disease, new weapons, displacement, inequality, bigotry and extremism that threaten global well-being. Because these challenges cross borders, no sovereign nation will succeed in countering them alone. Members of ACUNS contend that solutions to improve the human condition will be advanced through evidence-based analysis, international legal agreement, and multilateral action. As the only institution with worldwide membership, an effective United Nations is an existential imperative for the global good. ACUNS serves to foster well-studied action in the UN system.

== History ==
ACUNS was established in 1987 by a group of concerned scholars at Dartmouth College in Hanover, New Hampshire, USA. Since that time, it has been hosted by Brown University, Yale University, Wilfrid Laurier University, and Coventry University. In 2020, ACUNS became an independent nonprofit organization registered in the State of New York.

== UN status ==
ACUNS holds General Consultative Status with the United Nations Economic and Social Council (ECOSOC) and United Nations Department of Public Information (DPI), Associate Status with the United Nations Educational, Scientific and Cultural Organization (UNESCO), and observer status to United Nations Environment Assembly (UNEA). It is possible for council members to be registered to attend meetings organized by UN specialized agencies, the UN Secretariat, and other UN bodies. ACUNS currently has over 650 individual and 42 institutional members in 55 countries.

== Operations ==
- The ACUNS Annual Meeting draws approximately 300 scholars and practitioners each year for plenary sessions, roundtables, and workshop panels on a wide range of topics. Previous Meetings have been held in Brazil, Canada, Italy, Republic of Korea, South Africa, Trinidad, Turkey, United States of America, and as a global online event.
- The annual ACUNS Workshop brings early-career practitioners into conversation with junior academics on key aspects of international organization. The program draws together some 20 participants each year.
- The John W. Holmes Memorial Lecture, is delivered during the ACUNS Annual Meeting and subsequently published in Global Governance.
- The ACUNS Dissertation Award recognizes qualifying graduate students with a US$1500 prize and invites winners to submit an article to the Global Governance journal.
- The ACUNS Series on the UN System is an interdisciplinary book series with a broad focus on international organization, multilateralism, and global governance created in association with Edward Elgar Publishers.

== Publications ==
- Global Governance is an interdisciplinary, peer-reviewed journal published quarterly by Brill in association with ACUNS. The journal highlights research, opinion pieces, and book reviews of leading scholars on issues of peace and security, development, human rights, health, and the environment. The journal is currently hosted by Brigham Young University for a five-year term (2018–2023).
- As of 2021, the ACUNS Quarterly Newsletter was replaced by the ACUNS Monthly Bulletin, which includes timely organizational, professional, and academic information and announcements.

== Board of directors ==
ACUNS is led by an international Board of Directors, Officers, and Staff.

Board Members:

- Lise Morjé Howard (President and Director) - Professor of Government, Georgetown University
- Charlotte Ku (Past President and Director) - Texas A&M University School of Law
- Gabriel Amvane (Vice President and Director) - OFPRA
- Franz Baumann (Vice President and Director) - Professor, New York University
- Mónica Serrano (Member-at-Large and Director) - El Colegio de México
- Cecilia Cannon (Director) - Graduate Institute of International &amp; Development Studies
- Sarmad Khan (Director) - Office of the UN Resident Coordinator
- Kingsley Moghalu (Director) - Institute for Governance and Economic Transformation
- Marie McAuliffe (Director) - International Organization for Migration
- Heung-Soon Park (Director) - SunMoon University
- Richard Ponzio (Director) - Stimson Center

Officers:

- Jean Krasno (Treasurer) - City College of New York
- Courtney B. Smith (Assistant Treasurer) - Seton Hall University
- Ai Kihara-Hunt (Secretary) - University of Tokyo

Staff:

Filip Savatic serves as Administrative Coordinator.

== Liaison offices ==
ACUNS has a liaison office in Tokyo, Japan.
