= Abbey of Our Lady of the Holy Trinity =

Historic Trappist monastery in Huntsville, Utah

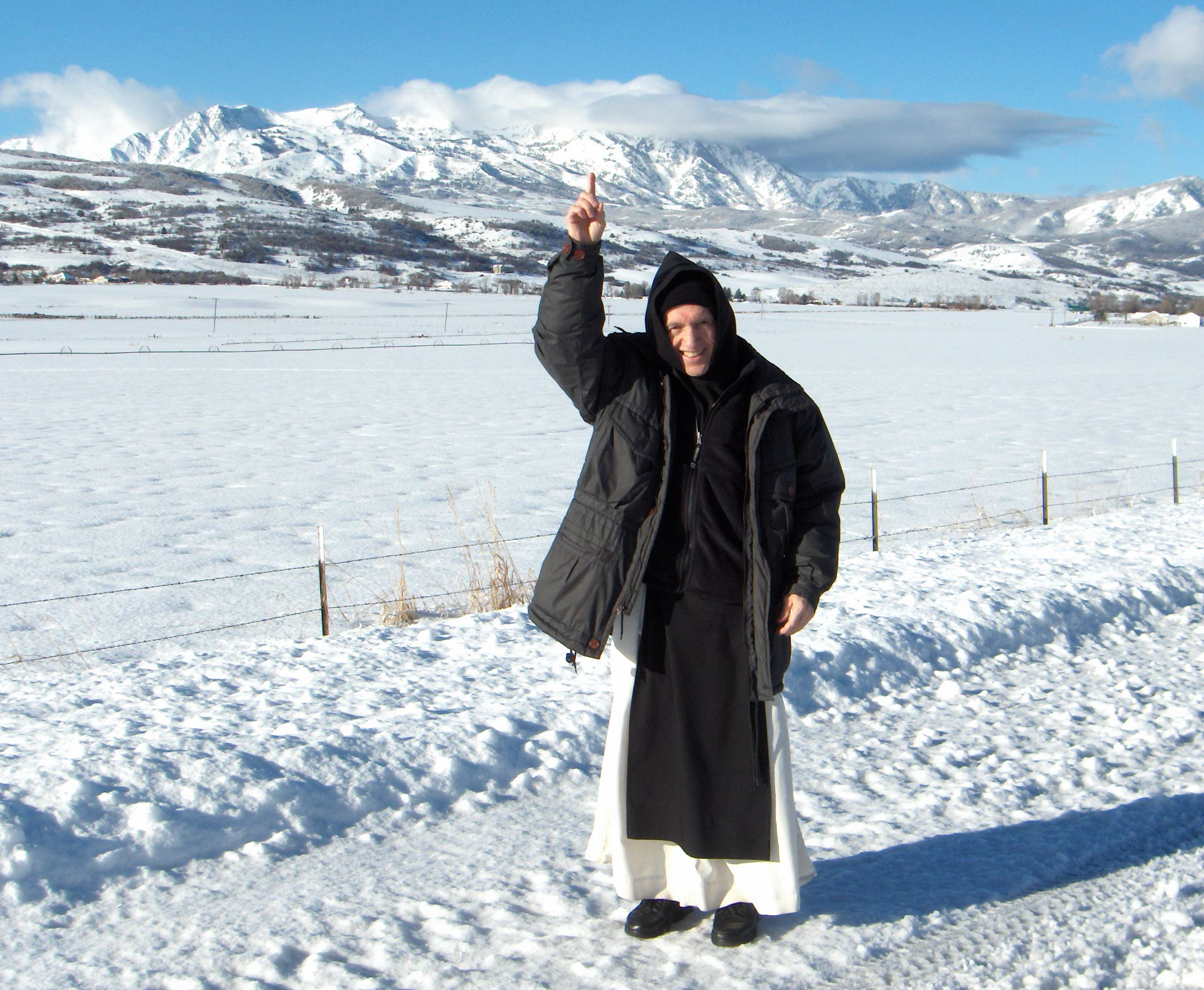
Father Patrick OCSO on the fields of the monastery pointing up to the Snowbasin Ski Area where some of the events of the 2002 Winter Olympics were held

The Abbey of Our Lady of the Holy Trinity was a Trappist Cistercian monastery in Huntsville, Utah, United States. They were Catholic contemplative monks of an enclosed religious order known as the Order of Cistercians of the Strict Observance (OCSO).

== History ==
The abbey was founded in 1947 as a daughter house of the Abbey of Our Lady of Gethsemani in Kentucky at the invitation of Bishop Hunt of Salt Lake City. The monks briefly used temporary World War II barracks which had been left on the location, and soon moved to Quonset huts. Plans to replace the deteriorating huts were placed on hold in 2007.

The monks had a special relationship with the Missionaries of Charity. In 1972, Mother Teresa visited Huntsville Abbey for a retreat with the monks, at the invitation of Brother Nicholas Prinster, one of the monks who had spent some time with her. He died in 2018.

The monks of Utah were involved with the founding of a Trappistine monastery of nuns in Arizona. Over the years, many of the priests from Utah were sent to be the chaplain for Santa Rita Abbey. National Geographic produced a short video about the Trappist Monks of Holy Trinity Abbey.

One of the notable monks at the abbey was former Abbot Casimir Bernas OCSO, who wrote almost 400 reviews of biblical and theological journals and textbooks. Walter M. Miller Jr. wrote a fictional book based on the monastery in Utah, A Canticle for Leibowitz. Utah author Richard Crangle wrote another fictional work loosely based on the monks of the monastery, titled Temptations Behind Stained Glass: A Canticle of Desires and Redemptions. A former Utah Trappist monk priest, George Fowler, wrote Dance of a fallen monk: a journey to spiritual enlightenment about his 20 years at the monastery, before he eventually left the Catholic Church to marry a former nun.

Father Charles Cummings, OCSO was an editor of Cistercian Studies Quarterly. He was also the author of monastic books, including Spirituality and the desert experience; Eco-spirituality : toward a reverent life; Songs of freedom: the psalter as a school of prayer; and two editions of Monastic Practices.

The monks supported themselves by farming and beekeeping on the abbey's 1,840 acres of land. Among other goods, they sold bread, multigrain cereal, creamed honey, and handmade clocks in the gift shop.

The abbey had 32 monks when it was founded, and at one point it held 84 monks and novices. As the number of monks at the abbey dwindled and the average age among those remaining increased, its industries were gradually discontinued. The decision was made to sell and close down the abbey.

On August 27, 2017, the abbey celebrated its final mass and was closed afterward. Two monks transferred their vow of stability to Genesee Abbey, another Trappist abbey in New York. One monk, Father Charles Cummings, OCSO became the chaplain at Our Lady of the Angels Monastery for the Trappist nuns in Crozet, Virginia. He died in 2020 while transferring his vow of stability to the Abbey of New Clairvaux in Vina, CA. The remaining monks moved to a nursing home in Salt Lake City. The influence of the monks on their neighbors in the valley was documented in a commentary printed in the Ogden, Utah newspaper.

In 2018, a documentary film, book and poster by John Slattery, cinematographer and director, titled PRESENT TIME: Journal of a Country Monastery, were crowdfunded to document the 70-year history of the abbey.

Brother David McManus, OCSO was the last librarian for the monks. He died in 2019.

Father David Altman and Father Patrick Boyle were interviewed by the local diocesan newspaper as they reviewed the finished limited edition of the book that has been released in advance of the DVD Present Time. Father David Altman was again interviewed by the Intermountain Catholic about the "stay-at-home-order" due to the COVID-19 pandemic being similar to having the entire world to adjust to certain monastic ways.

Michael Patrick O'Brien wrote a brief memoir in 2021 about his childhood contact with the monks; it is entitled Monastery Mornings: My Unusual Boyhood Among the Saints and Monks

== Gallery ==
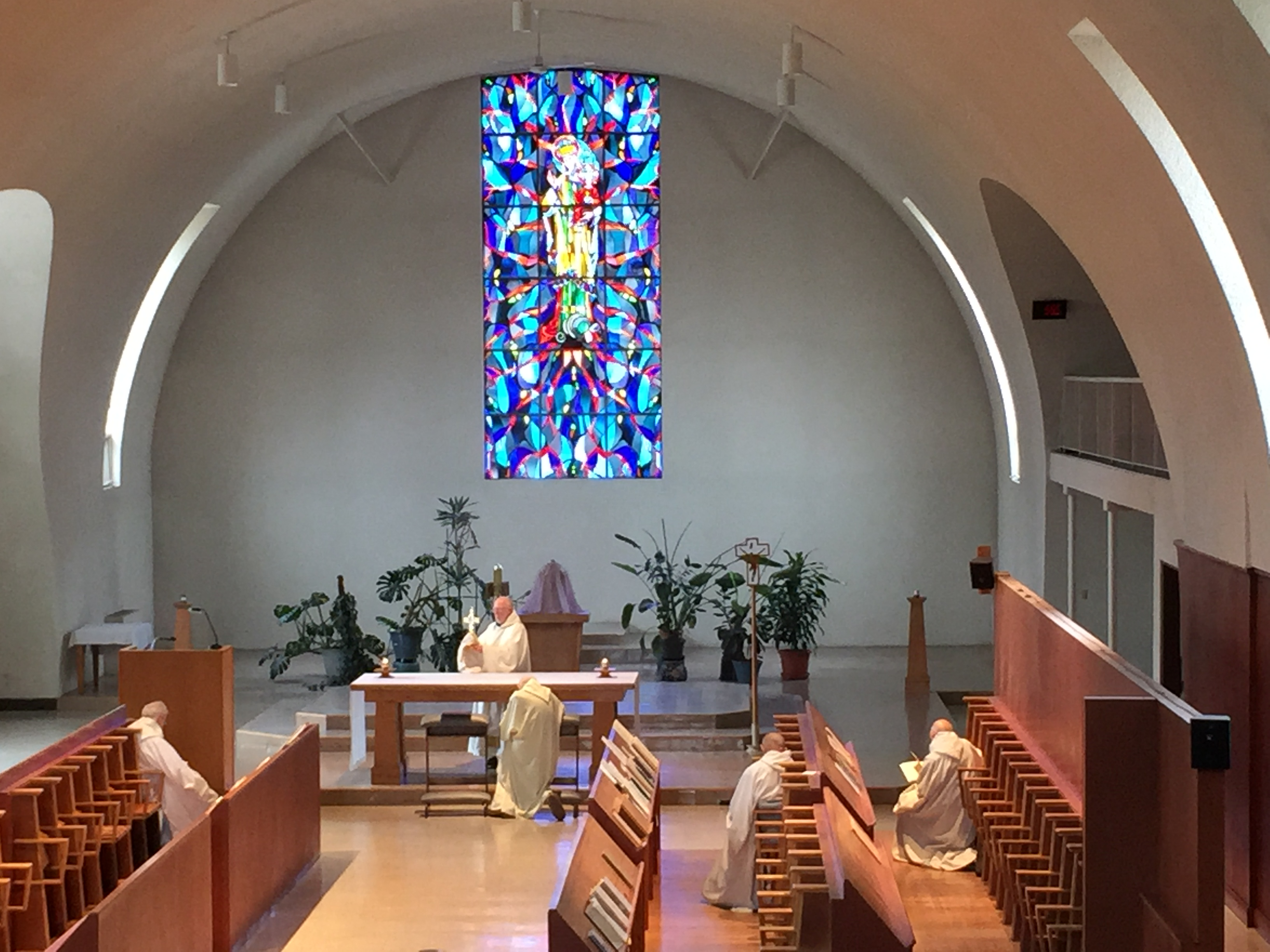
Abbot Brendan Freeman blessing the monks

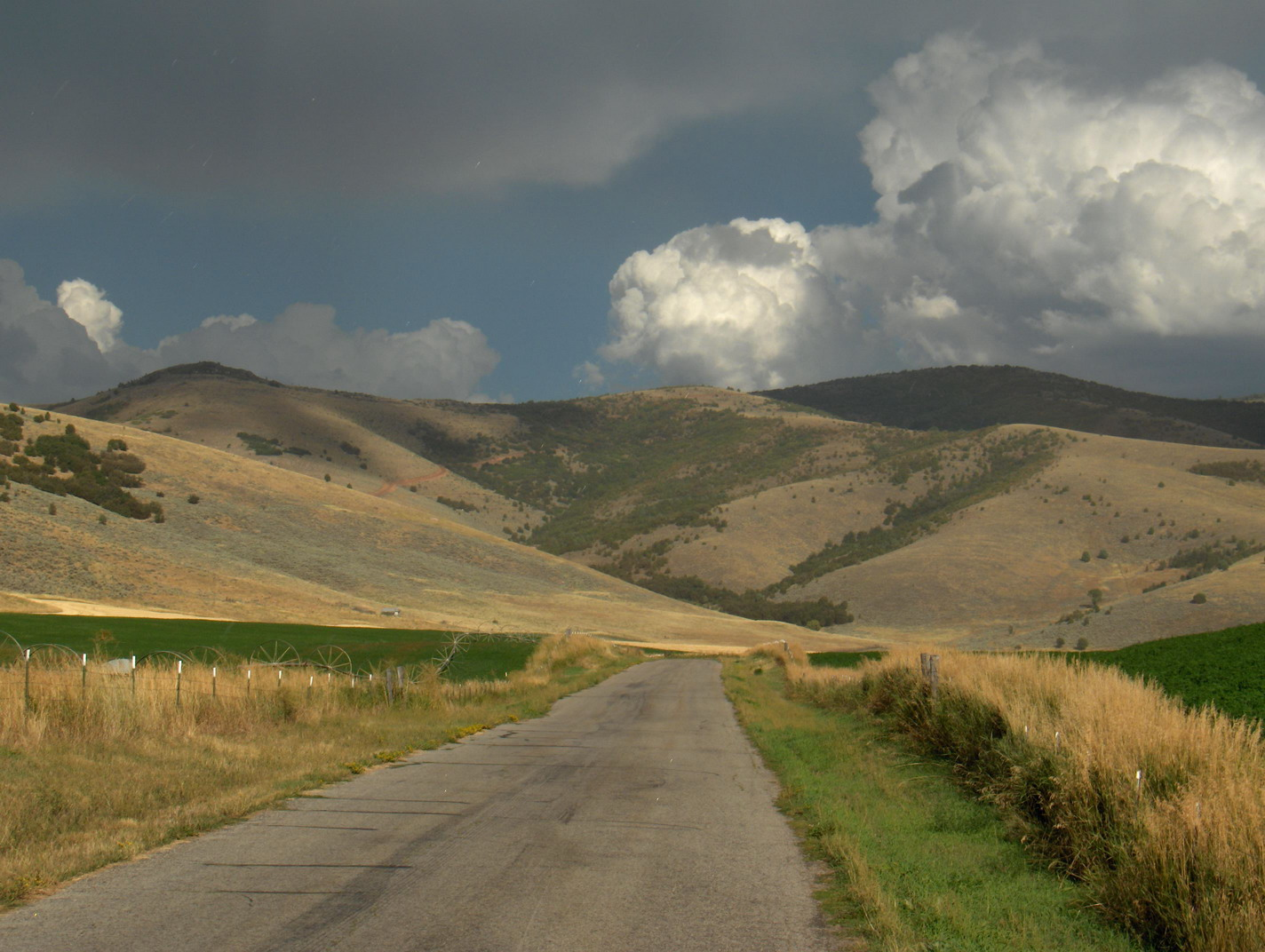
Abbey Road of Abbey of Our Lady of the Holy Trinity

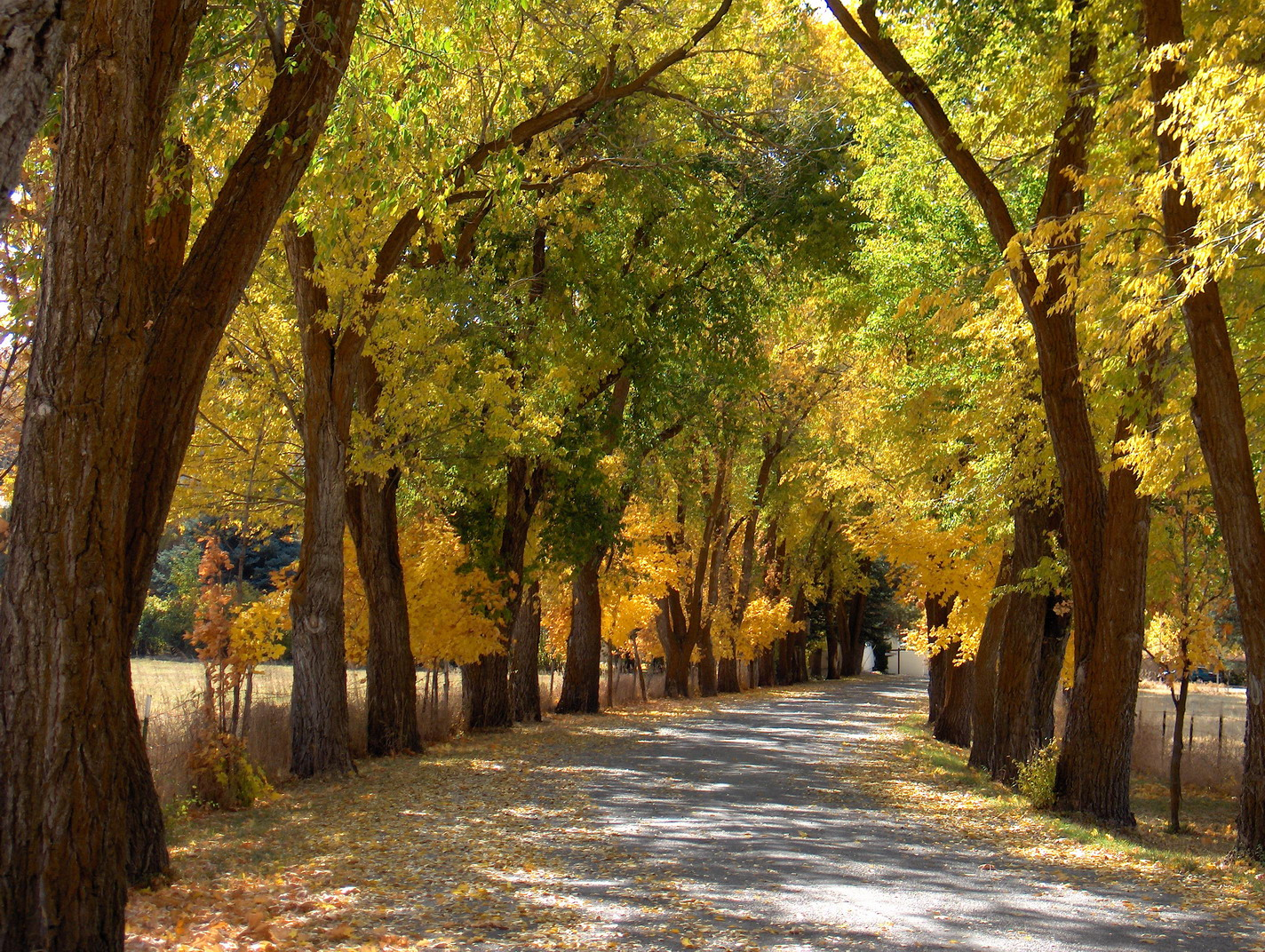
Fall leaves of the trees planted by the Trappist Cistercian monks along Abbey Road

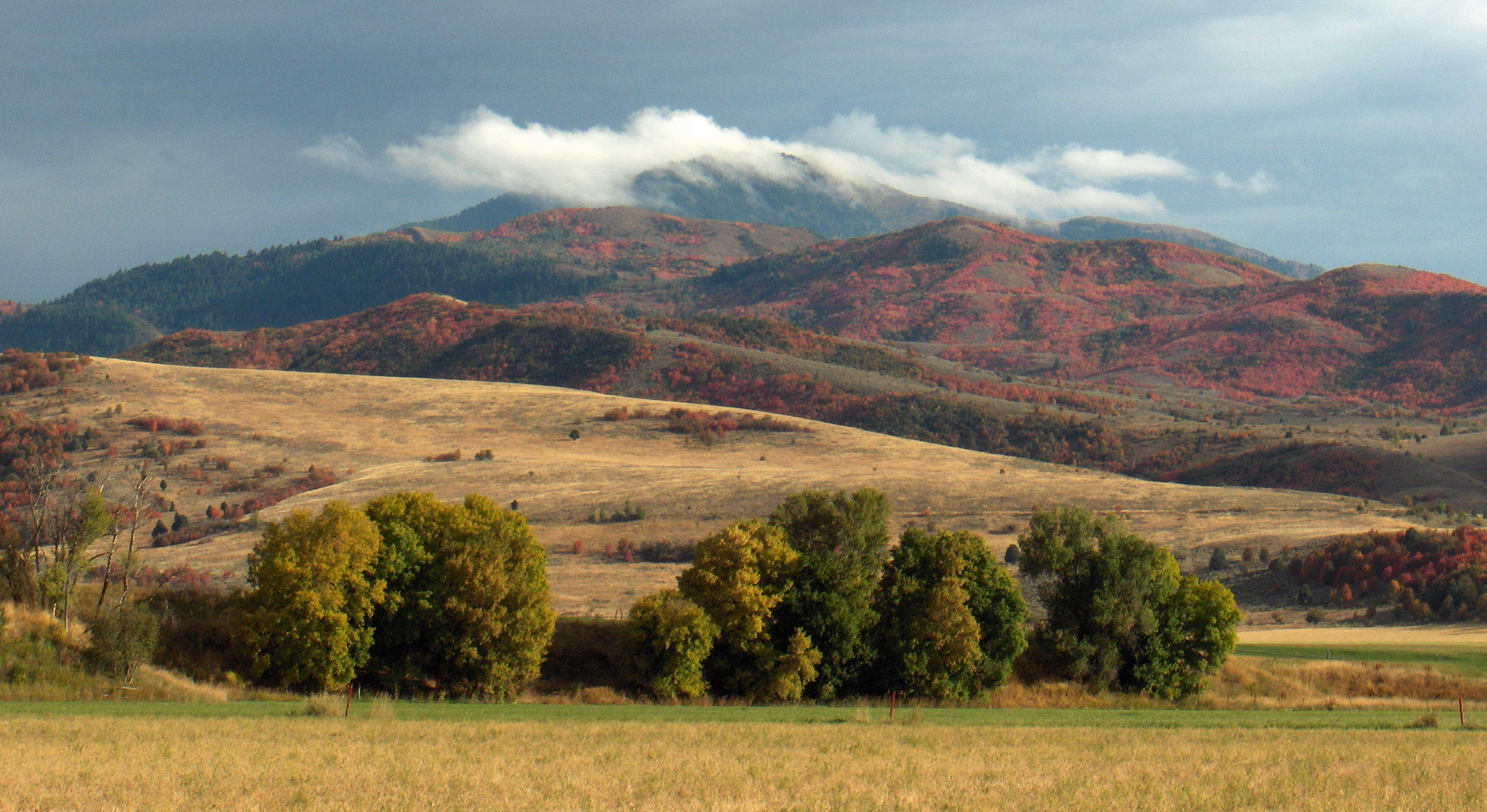
Fields of the monastery looking towards the hermitage

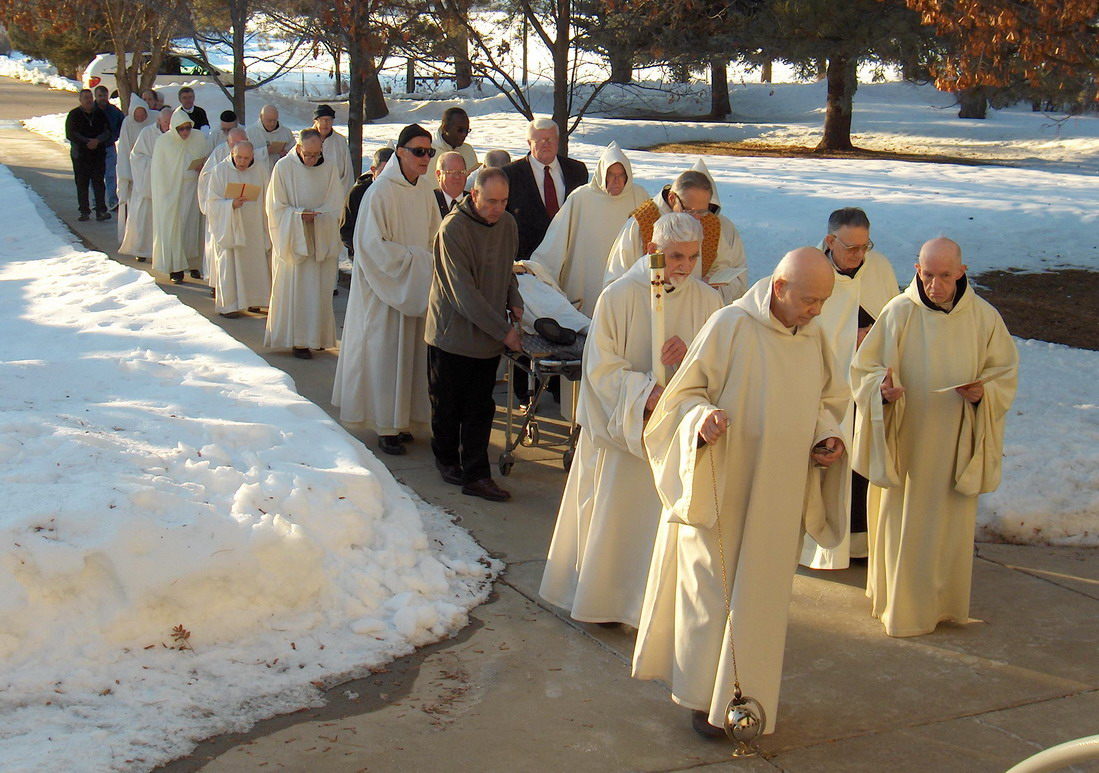
Bringing in the body of Brother Boniface for his prayers the night before his funeral

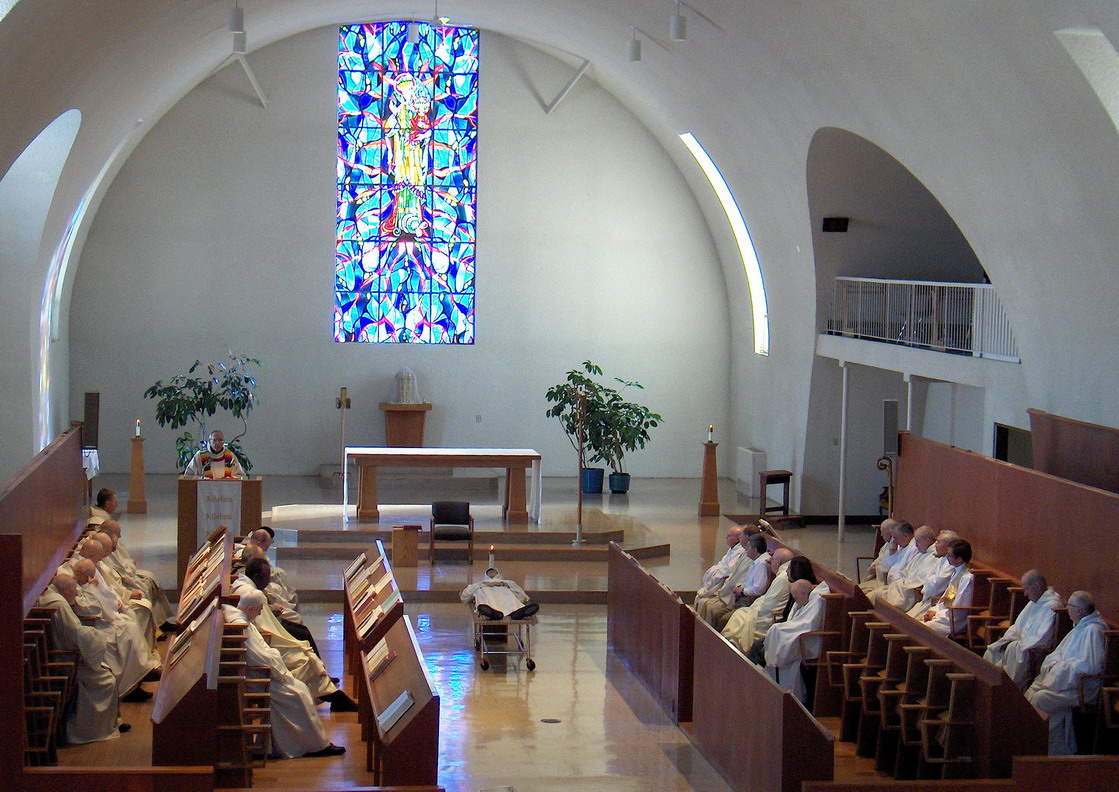
Funeral mass of Brother Boniface

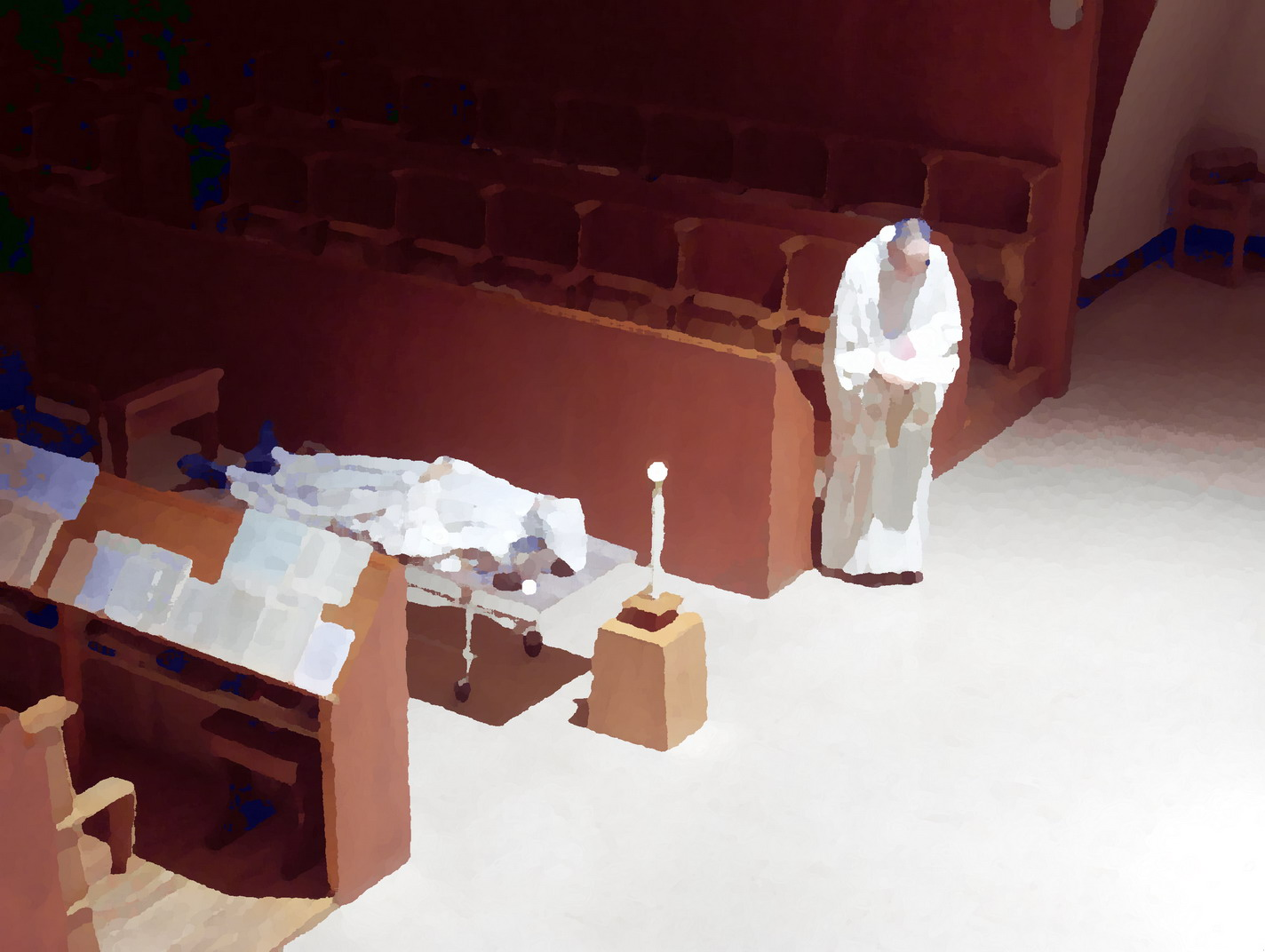
Brother Boniface being prayed over by Father Malachy
