= Mary Margaret Funk =

American writer and advocate of inter-religious dialogue

Sr. Mary Margaret Funk, OSB, is an American writer and advocate of inter-religious dialogue. Her published works include a trilogy of books on "The Practice of the Spiritual Life".

In 1993 Funk spoke at the Parliament of the World's Religions. From 1994 to 2004, she was Executive Director of the Monastic Interreligious Dialogue Board, which coordinates the organization that aims to foster inter-religious and inter-monastic dialogue. In this capacity, she coordinated a number of events, including the Gethsemani Encounters and Benedict's Dharma Conference. In 1995 she traveled to India and Tibet on the 6th Spiritual Exchange Program.

A former Prioress and current member of Our Lady of Grace Monastery in Beech Grove, Indiana, which she entered in 1961, Funk directs the School of Lectio Divina at the adjacent Benedict Inn.

== Books ==
- Discernment Matters: Listening With the Ear of the Heart (2013)
- Into the Depths: Memoirs of Bolivia (2011)
- Lectio Matters: Before the Burning Bush: Through the Revelatory Texts of Scripture, Nature and Experience (2010)
- Humility Matters: The Practice of the Spiritual Life (2005)
- Tools Matter For Practicing the Spiritual Life (2004)
- What Catholics Should Know About Islam (2004)
- Islam Is: An Experience of Dialogue and Devotion (2003)
- El Corazon En Paz: La Sabiduria de los Padres Del Desierto (2001)
- Thoughts Matter: The Practice of the Spiritual Life (1999)
- A Mind at Peace (1999)

== Other works ==
- Into Iraq: Dispatches From an America at War; A Nun's Prayer (Letter to the Editor, New York Times, March 21, 2003.)
