= Lise Morjé Howard =

Political scientist

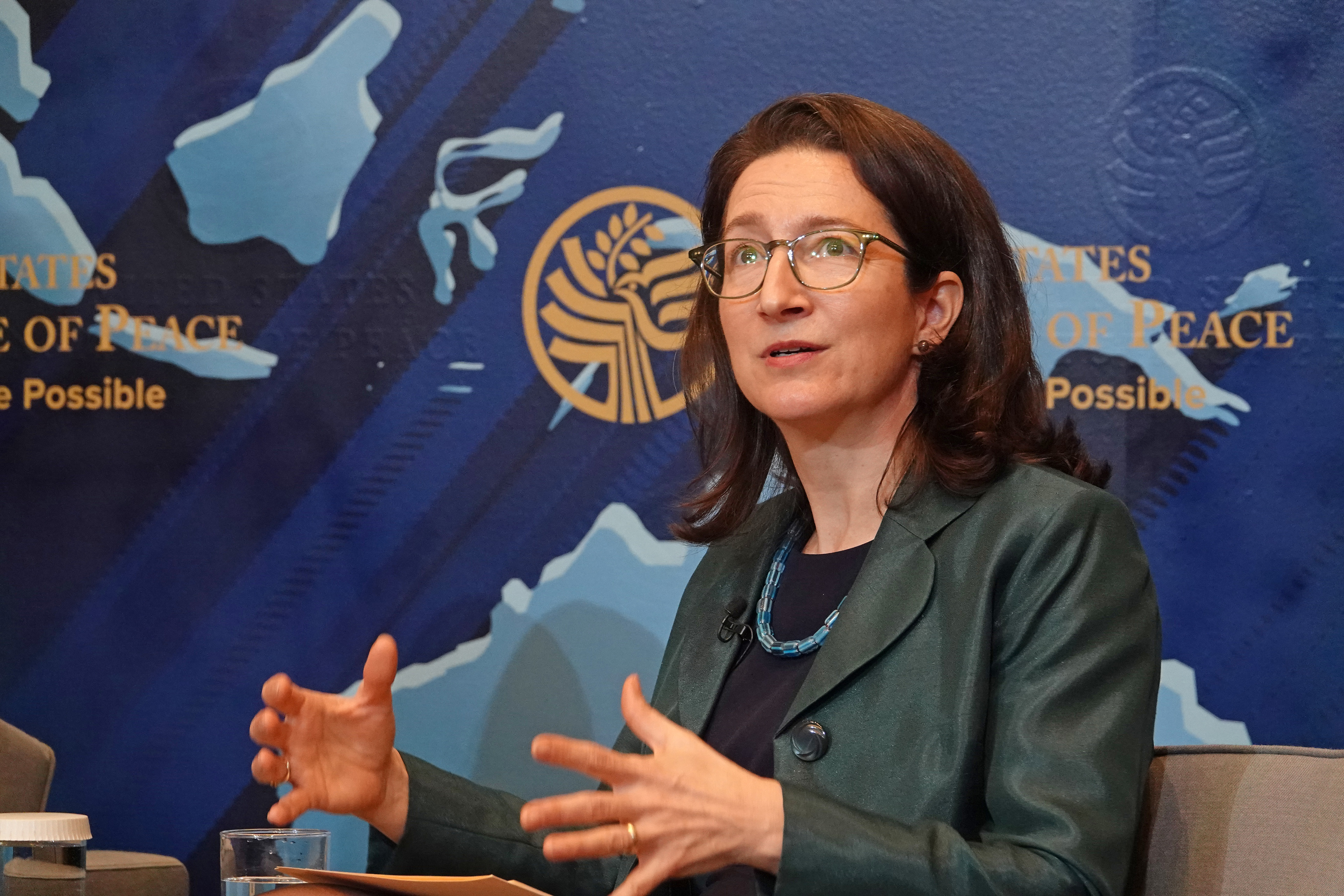
- Howard in 2023
- Born: 1969 (age 56–57)
- Spouse: Marc Morjé Howard (m. 1997; sep. 2023)
- Children: Two, born 2001 and 2004

Academic background
- Education: Barnard College; University of California, Berkeley

Academic work
- Discipline: International security
- Institutions: Georgetown University

Lise Morjé Howard is a political scientist from the United States (U.S.), an expert on United Nations peacekeeping, war termination, civil wars, and American foreign policy. She is currently a professor of government and foreign service at Georgetown University and president of the Academic Council on the United Nations System (ACUNS).

== Career ==
She completed her undergraduate studies at Barnard College, spending a semester abroad in 1990 at Leningrad State University in the former Union of Soviet Socialist Republics (USSR). After graduating from Barnard, she returned to Leningrad State University to study Soviet constitutional law from 1991 to 1992, witnessing the USSR's dissolution. From 1992 to 1994, she worked for the New York City Commission for the United Nations, managing an initiative that raised millions of dollars to retain UNICEF's headquarters in the city. In 1995 and 2001, respectively, she obtained her M.A. and Ph.D. from the University of California at Berkeley. Her doctoral dissertation, Learning to Keep the Peace? UN Multidimensional Peacekeeping in Civil Wars, advised by Ernst B. Haas, focused on organizational learning as one of the reasons behind the success and failure of UN peacekeeping operations.

From 2002 to 2004, she was an assistant professor of government at Wesleyan University. Since 2003, she has worked at Georgetown University as visiting assistant professor (2003–2008), founding director of the Master's Program in Conflict Resolution (2004-2008), assistant professor of government (2008–2012), international relations field chair for the Department of Government (2015–2016, 2017–2019), and as a tenured associate professor of government (2012–2020), and Professor or Government and Foreign Service (2020–present). She has also held fellowships at Stanford (CISAC), Harvard (Belfer Center), the University of Maryland (CIDCM), and the U.S. Institute of Peace. She has served as president of ACUNS since 2020.

Her research and teaching focuses is in the fields of international relations, comparative politics, and international security. She has published articles about peacekeeping, civil war termination, and American foreign policy. Her 2008 book, UN Peacekeeping in Civil Wars (Cambridge University Press, 2008), won the 2010 Book Award from the Friends of the Academic Council on the UN System for the best book on the UN system published in the previous three years. Her recent articles have examined historical changes to the ways that civil wars end as well as the use of force in UN peacekeeping. Her 2019 book, Power in Peacekeeping (Cambridge University Press, 2019), explores the various tools peacekeepers use to exert power and realize the objectives of their missions. It won the 2021 Book Award from the International Security Studies Section of the International Studies Association. In 2018, she delivered a TedX Georgetown talk on UN peacekeeping.

Howard and co-author Michael E. O'Hanlon have proposed an Atlantic-Asian Security Community as a way to bring new partners into a security institution to keep Russia out of Ukraine, but that one day, Russia might join.

== Publications ==
=== Books ===
- Power in Peacekeeping. Cambridge: Cambridge University Press, 2019.
  - Reviewed in: H-Net Reviews/H-Diplo, International Affairs, International Peacekeeping, Journal of Peace Research, NUST Journal of International Peace & Stability, Political Science Quarterly.
- UN Peacekeeping in Civil Wars. Cambridge: Cambridge University Press, 2008. (Review )
  - Reviewed in: African Studies Quarterly, Democracy and Society, Dynamics of Asymmetric Conflict, H-Net Reviews in the Humanities and Social Sciences, International Law and Politics, International Peacekeeping, International Studies Review, Perspectives on Politics, Political Science Quarterly.

=== Articles ===
- “The Extraordinary Relationship between Peacekeeping and Peace.” With Barbara Walter and V. Page Fortna. British Journal of Political Science, 51 (4), 2021: 1705-1722.
- “Peacekeeping.” Oxford Bibliographies in Military History, Oxford University Press, 2021.
- “Peacekeeping is not Counterinsurgency.” International Peacekeeping, 26 (1) 2019: 545-548.
- “The Use of Force in UN Peacekeeping.” With Anjali Dayal. International Organization. 72 (1) 2018: 71-103.
- “How Civil Wars End: The International System, Norms, and the Role of External Actors.” With Alexandra Stark. International Security. 42 (3) 2017-18: 127-171.
  - Winner of the Best Security Article Award, International Security Studies Section, International Studies Association.
- “Why Civil Wars Are Lasting Longer.” Foreign Affairs. February 27, 2018.
- “U.S. Foreign Policy Habits in Ethnic Conflict.” International Studies Quarterly. 59 (4) 2016: 721-734.
- “Peacekeeping, Peace Enforcement, and UN Reform.” Georgetown Journal of International Affairs. 16 (2) 2015: 6-13.
- “Kosovo and Timor Leste: Neotrusteeship, Neighbors, and the United Nations.” Annals of the American Academy of Political and Social Science. 656 (1) 2014: 116-135.
- “The Ethnocracy Trap.” Journal of Democracy. 23 (4) 2012: 155-169.
- “Sources of Change in US-UN Relations.” Global Governance. 16 (4) 2010: 485-503.
- “Pitfalls and Prospects in the Peacekeeping Literature.” With V. Page Fortna. Annual Review of Political Science. 11 2008: 283-301.
- “UN Peace Implementation in Namibia: The Causes of Success.” International Peacekeeping. 9 (1) 2002: 99-132.
