= Roger Ballard (sociologist) =

British sociologist

- Born: 20 April 1943; York, England
- Died: 30 September 2020 (aged 77)
- Resting place: Muslim section of the Ashton cemetery

Academic background
- Education: Cambridge University; Delhi University

Academic work
- Discipline: Sociology; Indology
- Sub-discipline: Social anthropology; Religious studies
- Institutions: University of Manchester
- Doctoral students: Virinder Kalra; Seán McLoughlin

Roger Ballard FRAI (20 April 1943 – 30 September 2020) was a British sociologist, Lecturer in Race Relations at the University of Leeds (1975–1989), and Senior Lecturer in Comparative Religion at the University of Manchester (1989–2003). In Manchester, he taught Urdu language and set up the joint-degree in Comparative Religion and Social Anthropology. In 2003, at the age of 60, Ballard took early retirement from his teaching post in the University of Manchester to service as a consultant anthropologist and Director of Centre for Applied South Asian Studies (CASAS) in Stalybridge. In 2012, Ballard was awarded the Lucy Mair Medal for Applied Anthropology by the Royal Anthropological Institute.

== Publications ==
- Desh Pardesh: The South Asian Presence in Britain (C. Hurst & Co, 1990)
- Legal Practice and Cultural Diversity (Routledge, 2009)
