= Tim Winter (sociologist) =

Australian sociologist

Academic background
- Education: Lancaster University (MA); University of Manchester (PhD)
- Thesis: Transforming Angkor: An Enquiry Into Formations of Place, Heritage and Culture in an Age of Tourism (2003)
- Doctoral advisor: Virinder Kalra

Academic work
- Discipline: Sociology; International relations
- Sub-discipline: Critical Heritage Studies; Cultural studies
- School or tradition: Constructivism
- Institutions: National University of Singapore
- Main interests: Belt and Road Initiative
- Notable ideas: Geocultural power in IR
- Website: https://www.silkroadfutures.net

Tim C. Winter FAHA is a British sociologist and international relations (IR) scholar, Professor and Senior Research Fellow at Asia Research Institute, National University of Singapore. His research interests revolve around understanding how cultural heritage influences public audiences and features in issues such as urban development, diplomacy, geopolitics, post-conflict recovery, sustainability, postcolonial identities, and nationalism. He has contributed to the conceptual development of heritage diplomacy and introduced geocultural power to the analysis of IR. He was previously an Australian Research Council Professorial Future Fellow, Professor of Critical Heritage Studies (CHS) at the University of Western Australia, and Research Professor in CHS at Cultural Heritage Centre for Asia and the Pacific, Deakin University. He was the Editor of Historic Environment (2006-2015). He is President of the Association of Critical Heritage Studies and was elected a Fellow of the Australian Academy of the Humanities in 2020.

== Publications ==
- Post-Conflict Heritage, Postcolonial Tourism: Culture, Politics and Development at Angkor (Routledge, 2007)
- Geocultural Power: China’s Quest to Revive the Silk Roads for the Twenty First Century (University of Chicago Press, 2019)
- The Silk Road: Connecting histories and futures (Oxford University Press, 2022)
