= Eric D. Patterson =

Political scientist specialising in international relations

Eric D. Patterson is an American political scientist whose work focuses on international relations, just war theory, and the intersection of religion and public policy. His advanced degrees are from the University of California, Santa Barbara and the University of Wales at Aberystwyth. He serves as President & CEO of the Victims of Communism Memorial Foundation in Washington, DC. He worked for five years as Executive Vice President and President at the Religious Freedom Institute in Washington, DC, and previously served as Dean and Professor of the Robertson School of Government at Regent University in Virginia Beach, VA. Before that he worked at Georgetown University's Berkley Center for Religion, Peace, and World Affairs in Washington, DC. His government experience includes service as an Air National Guard commander, the White House Fellowship, and time as a William C. Foster Fellow working at the U.S. State Department's Bureau of Political-Military Affairs. His academic articles have appeared in Public Integrity, Journal of Military Ethics, Survival, International Studies Perspectives, International Journal of Religious Freedom, Democracy and Society, Journal of Human Security, International Journal of Applied Philosophy, International Politics, Foreign Policy Journal, International Journal of Intelligence and CounterIntelligence, Journal of Political Science, Journal for the Scientific Study of Religion, and Security Studies.

== Books ==
- A Basic Guide to the Just War Tradition: Christian Foundations and Practices. (Baker Academic, 2023).
- Military Necessity and Just War Statecraft: The Principle of National Security Stewardship (War, Conflict, and Ethics). Co-edited with Marc LiVecche (Routledge, 2023).
- James Turner Johnson and the Just War Tradition: Selected Essays. Co-edited with Gina G. Palmer and Timothy J. Demy (Stone Tower Press, 2023).
- Power Politics and Moral Order: Three Generations of Christian Realism (A Reader) Co-edited with Robert Joustra (Wipf & Stock, 2022).
- Just War and Christian Traditions. Co-edited with J. Daryl Charles (University of Notre Dame Press, 2022).
- Just American Wars: Ethical Dilemmas in U.S. Military History (War, Conflict and Ethics). (Routledge, 2019).
- Philosophers on War. Co-authored with Timothy Demy (Stone Tower Press, 2019).
- The Reagan Manifesto: “A Time For Choosing” and Its Influence. Co-edited with Jeffry H. Morrison (Palgrave MacMillan, 2016).
- The Ashgate Companion to Military Ethics: (Justice, International Law and Global Security). Co-authored with James Turner Johnson (Routledge, 2016).
- Military Chaplains in Afghanistan, Iraq, and Beyond: Advisement and Leader Engagement in Highly Religious Environments (Peace and Security in the 21st Century). Editor (Rowman & Littlefield, 2014).
- Ethics Beyond War's End. Editor (Georgetown University Press, 2012).
- Ending Wars Well: Order, Justice, and Conciliation in Contemporary Post-Conflict (Yale University Press, 2012).
- Politics in a Religious World: Building a Religiously Informed U.S. Foreign Policy (Continuum, 2011).
- Debating the War of Ideas. Co-authored with John Gallagher (Palgrave MacMillan, 2009).
- Christianity and Power Politics Today: Christian Realism and Contemporary Political Dilemmas (Palgrave MacMillan, 2008).
- Just War Thinking: Morality and Pragmatism in the Struggle against Contemporary Threats (Lexington Books, 2007).
- Latin America's Neo-Reformation: Religion's Influence on Politics (Latin American Studies). (Routledge, 2005).
- The Christian Realists: Reassessing the Contribution of Niebuhr and His Contemporaries (University Press of America, 2003).
