= List of scientific misconduct incidents =

Scientific misconduct is a serious form of violation of the standard codes of scholarly conduct and ethical behavior in the publication of professional scientific research. A Lancet review on Handling of Scientific Misconduct in Scandinavian countries gave examples of policy definitions. In Denmark, scientific misconduct is defined as "intention[al] negligence leading to fabrication of the scientific message or a false credit or emphasis given to a scientist", and in Sweden as "intention[al] distortion of the research process by fabrication of data, text, hypothesis, or methods from another researcher's manuscript form or publication; or distortion of the research process in other ways."

A 2009 systematic review and meta-analysis of survey data found that about 2% of scientists admitted to falsifying, fabricating, or modifying data at least once.

== Biology and biomedical sciences ==
- Bharat Aggarwal (US), a former Ransom Horne, Jr. Distinguished Professor of Cancer Research at the University of Texas MD Anderson Cancer Center, resigned from his position after fraud was discovered in 65 papers published by him in the area of curcumin as a treatment for cancer. As of 2024 Aggarwal has had 30 of his research papers retracted, with 10 others having received an expression of concern and 17 others having been corrected.
- Anna Ahimastos (Australia) resigned from her position at Melbourne's Baker IDI Heart & Diabetes Institute in 2015 after admitting to fabricating data in a trial of the blood pressure drug ramipril that analyzed if ramipril could reduce pain in people with peripheral artery disease. As of 2025, Ahimastos has had nine of her research publications retracted.
- Elias Alsabti (Iraq, US), was a medical practitioner who posed as a biomedical researcher. He plagiarized as many as 60 papers in the field of cancer research, many with non-existent co-authors.
- Werner Bezwoda (South Africa), formerly of the University of Witwatersrand, admitted to scientific misconduct in trials on high-dose chemotherapy on breast cancer, stating that he had "committed a serious breach of scientific honesty and integrity."
- Joachim Boldt (Germany), an anesthesiologist formerly based at the Justus Liebig University Giessen, was stripped of his professorship and criminally investigated for forgery in his research studies. As of 2024, Boldt has had 220 of his research publications retracted, and 10 others have received an expression of concern.
- C. David Bridges (US), an emeritus researcher at Purdue University and formerly at Baylor College of Medicine, was found by a NIH investigation panel to have stolen ideas from a rival's manuscript that Bridges had been asked to review, and used that information to produce and publish his own research on eye enzymes. The investigating panel described Bridges' conduct as "an egregious misconduct of science that undermines the entire concept and practice of scientific experimentation and ethical responsibility", with NIH later stripping Bridges of his funding.
- Silvia Bulfone-Paus (Germany, UK), an immunologist at the Research Center Borstel and a professor of immunobiology at the University of Manchester, has had 13 of her publications retracted following investigations of scientific misconduct involving image manipulation.
- Cyril Burt (UK) was accused posthumously of faking statistics in I.Q. studies, and of inventing two co-authors in questionable papers he had published.
- Ranjit Chandra (Canada), former nutrition researcher at Memorial University of Newfoundland and self-proclaimed "father of nutritional immunology", was in 2015 stripped of his Order of Canada membership following accusations of scientific wrongdoing in his research. In 2015 Chandra lost a $132 million case against the CBC, which in 2006 presented a documentary in which 10 of Chandra's publications were identified as "fraudulent or highly suspicious"; Chandra was ordered to pay the CBC $1.6 million to cover the defendant's legal fees. As of 2020 four of Chandra's research publications have been retracted.
- Ching-Shih Chen (US), the former chair of cancer research at Ohio State University, was investigated by OSU and the federal Office of Research Integrity after being anonymously reported for falsifying data. The investigation found that Chen mishandled images and figures in published papers, "intentionally falsified data", and did not keep any laboratory notebooks on his research, a violation of federal research policies. As of 2024 Chen has had ten research publications retracted, two other papers have received an expression of concern, and five other papers have been corrected.
- Carlo M. Croce (US), an oncologist and professor of medicine at Ohio State University, has been the subject of several allegations of scientific misconduct, including data falsification, and related institutional investigations. Croce, who has been described as a "serial plaintiff", has filed lawsuits against critics, including a defamation claim against The New York Times that in 2018 was dismissed, a defamation lawsuit he lost against David Sanders of Purdue University and a lawsuit he lost against Ohio State University to reclaim a department chair position from which he was removed. In 2026, Croce lost two other lawsuits against OSU involving claims related to various breaches of contract, unpaid bonuses, and rehabilitation of his reputation. As of 2026, 18 of Croce's research publications have been retracted, five others have received an expression of concern, and 24 others have been corrected.
- Andrew Jess Dannenberg (US), a physician and cancer researcher formerly associated with Weill Medical College at Cornell University, had several of his published papers retracted in 2020 due to irregularities in the figures, and in 2022 additional publications were retracted due to "evidence of data falsification or fabrication." As of 2023 Dannenberg has had 20 of his research publications retracted, with two other publications receiving an expression of concern.
- John Darsee (US), a cardiologist formerly based at Harvard University, fabricated data in published research articles and more than 100 abstracts and book chapters. In 1983 Darsee was disbarred for ten years by the US National Institutes of Health. Darsee has had at least 17 of his publications retracted.
- Dipak Das (US), former director of the Cardiovascular Research Center at the University of Connecticut Health Center, was found in a University investigation to be guilty of 145 counts of fabrication or falsification of research data. As of 2023, Das has had 23 of his research publications retracted.
- Masoumeh Ebtekar (Iran), head of the Iranian Department of Environment at Tarbiat Modares University in Tehran, substantially plagiarized several previously published articles in a 2006 paper that was later retracted.
- Terry Elton (US), Professor of Pharmacology at Ohio State University, was found guilty in 2013 of scientific misconduct by both a University committee and the Office of Research Integrity. Elton has had seven of his publications retracted.
- Ariel Fernandez (US), former professor of Bioengineering at Rice University, was found in 2022 to have falsified research findings "in 12 published papers, four unpublished manuscripts, one presentation, and three grant applications". In 2026, the United States Office of Research Integrity formally debarred Fernandez for scientific misconduct, for a period of fifteen years.
- Yoshitaka Fujii (Japan), an anesthesiologist, was found to have fabricated data in at least 183 scientific papers, setting what is believed to be a record for the number of papers by a single author requiring retractions. A committee reviewing 212 papers published by Fujii over a span of 20 years found that 126 were entirely fabricated, with no scientific work done. Only 3 were found to be valid. He was also found to have forged the signatures of scientists he listed as co-authors without their knowledge. As of 2023, Fujii has had 182 of their research publications retracted, and 47 others have received an expression of concern.
- Dong-Pyou Han (US), former assistant professor of biomedical sciences at Iowa State University, added human antibodies to samples of rabbit blood in an effort to falsely enhance the utility of an experimental HIV vaccine. In 2015 Han was sentenced to nearly five years in prison and ordered to return $7.2 million to the NIH.
- Elizabeth Holmes, biotech entrepreneur and founder of the medical diagnostic company Theranos, was convicted for fraud and in November 2022 sentenced to serve 11 1/4 years in prison.
- Many major trials of the drug ivermectin that claimed it could prevent COVID-19 were found to show signs of fraud and had "either obvious signs of fabrication or errors so critical they invalidate the study," according to one of the groups investigating the studies. For example, some studies were found to list patients who had never actually participated in the research, and others placed patients who were already statistically more likely to die in the placebo group while putting the healthier patients in the experimental group that received ivermectin. Studies that were found to contain legitimate research were generally inconclusive about the effects of ivermectin on COVID-19.
- He Jiankui (China), former associate professor with the Southern University of Science and Technology, was in 2019 sentenced to three years in prison and fined three million yuan (about US$430,000) for illegally carrying out human embryo gene-editing intended for reproduction. The case is called the He Jiankui affair.
- Woo-suk Hwang (Hwang Woo-suk) (South Korea), former Professor of Biotechnology at Seoul National University, was found by a University committee to have committed "deliberate fabrication" in his research on stem cells, and to have coerced female members of his research team to donate their eggs. The incidence is known as the Hwang affair. In 2009 Hwang was found guilty by the Seoul Central District Court of embezzlement and bioethical violations in connection to his research program.
- Sophie Jamal (Canada), former Professor of Medicine at University of Toronto and former staff endocrinologist at Women's College Hospital, Toronto, falsified data from studies of nitroglycerin compounds in osteoporosis. Results published in the Journal of the American Medical Association (JAMA) in 2011 were retracted by the Journal in 2016. In 2016 Jamal received a lifetime funding ban from the Canadian Institutes of Health Research and in 2018 her license to practice medicine was revoked by the College of Physicians and Surgeons of Ontario. Jamal has had four of her research publications retracted.
- Abderrahmane Kaidi, Senior Lecturer in Cellular and Molecular Medicine at the University of Bristol, was accused of misconduct towards his research team. In 2018, the university investigated the case and with it found out that he had also made fake research data, which he admitted were to impress other scientists for collaboration and were not for publication. He resigned from the university. The University of Cambridge also investigated his research as a postdoctoral scholar at the Gurdon Institute from where he published several research papers on DNA damage. Two journals, Science and Nature retracted one article each, written with his mentor Stephen Jackson, published in 2010 and 2013 respectively, simultaneously on 11 April 2019 following evidence of data fabrications.
- Shigeaki Kato (Japan), a former professor at the University of Tokyo, has been confirmed responsible for misconduct in 33 papers on nuclear receptors. Most of the fabrications were discovered on an anonymous bulletin board 2channel, and the information was spread by anonymous individual(s). As of 2024, Kato has had 40 research publications retracted, and three others have received an expression of concern. (See Japanese scientific misconduct allegations.)
- Kim Tae-kook (South Korea), formerly of the Korea Advanced Institute of Science and Technology, falsified research on modulating cellular proteins with the synthetic compound CGK733.
- Gideon Koren (Canada), former Director of the Motherisk Program at The Hospital for Sick Children in Toronto, published an article without the informed consent of co-author Nancy Olivieri, and sent her anonymous harassing letters. A December 2018 article in The Toronto Star reported apparent problems in more than 400 papers coauthored by Koren, including "inadequately peer-reviewed, failed to declare, and perhaps even obscure, conflicts of interest, and, in a handful of cases, contain lies about the methodology". Koren has threatened a defamation lawsuit against the editor of Therapeutic Drug Monitoring for retracting one of Koren's papers. As of 2022 Koren has had six of his research publications retracted, three others have received an expression of concern, and four others have been corrected.
- Steven A. Leadon (US), former professor of radiation oncology and head of the molecular radiobiology program at the University of North Carolina, falsified and fabricated data in his research on DNA repair. Leadon has had seven of his research papers retracted.
- Annarosa Leri (US, Italy) and Piero Anversa (US, Italy), collaborators and former researchers at Harvard University, were found in a 2014 investigation to have "manipulated and falsified" data in their research on endogenous cardiac stem cells, and to have included "false scientific information" in grant applications; these events resulted in Partners HealthCare and Brigham and Women's Hospital paying a $10 million settlement to the US government, and pausing a clinical trial based on Anversa and Leri's work. In October 2018, following many failed replications of their work, Harvard University and Brigham and Women's Hospital called for the retraction of 31 publications from the Anversa/Leri research group. Anversa and Leri lost a lawsuit they brought against Harvard that claimed the 2014 investigation had damaged their reputations. As of 2024, Anversa and Leri have had 19 research publications retracted, 17 others have received an expression of concern, and 12 others have been corrected.
- Sylvain Lesné (France, US), a neuroscientist, co-authored a study in Nature proposing that a specific amyloid-beta protein assembly, Aβ*56, impairs memory and contributes to Alzheimer's disease pathogenesis. In 2024, Nature retracted this paper after investigations revealed manipulated images, with co-authors Michela Gallagher and Karen H. Ashe agreeing to the retraction, while Lesné disagreed. The story was revealed in 2022 by Charles Piller in Science, based upon investigations by Matthew Schrag, a neuroscientist and physician at Vanderbilt University. This narrative is a key component of Piller's 2025 book Doctored: Fraud, Arrogance, and Tragedy in the Quest to Cure Alzheimer's.
- Paolo Macchiarini (Sweden, Italy), a thoracic surgeon and researcher formerly at the Karolinska Institutet, was in 2017 found by an ethics review board to have committed research misconduct, including false claims of clinical success and falsely claiming ethical approval for his surgical interventions, in his work on the surgical implantation of artificial trachea seeded with patients' own stem cells. The review board recommended that six of Macchiarini's publications be retracted. As of 2024, Macchiarini has had 12 of his research papers retracted, four others have received an expression of concern, and three others have been corrected.
- Johnny Matson (US), former professor of psychology at Louisiana State University, who was criticized starting in 2015 for his peer review practices as a journal editor, in 2023 had 24 of his research papers retracted because of undisclosed conflicts of interest, duplicated methodology, and a compromised peer-review process.
- William McBride (Australia), a physician who discovered the teratogenicity of thalidomide, was found by an Australian medical tribunal to have "deliberately published false and misleading scientific reports and altered the results of experiments" on the effects of Debendox/Bendectin on pregnancy.
- Moon Hyung-in (South Korea), former Professor in the Department of Medicinal Biotechnology at Dong-A University (South Korea), used false names and email addresses to "peer review" his own research publications. Moon has had 35 of his research publications retracted.
- H.M. Krishna Murthy (US), a protein crystallographer and former research associate professor at the University of Alabama at Birmingham, was found in 2009 by a University committee to be "solely responsible for ... fraudulent data" on protein structures published in nine papers. In 2018 the United States Office of Research Integrity placed a 10-year ban on Federal funding for Murthy. As of 2020 ten of Krishna Murthy's publications have been retracted, and two others have received an expression of concern.
- Haruko Obokata (Japan) formerly of RIKEN and Harvard University, falsified data in the widely publicized STAP cell fraud. As of 2021, Obokata has had four of her research publications retracted.
- Luk Van Parijs (US), Associate Professor at the Massachusetts Institute of Technology (MIT) fabricated and falsified data in research papers, unpublished manuscripts, and grant applications. He was convicted in 2011 of making a false statement on a federal grant application. Parijs has had five research publications retracted.
- Milena Penkowa (Denmark), a neuroscientist and former professor at the Panum Institute of the University of Copenhagen, was in 2010 convicted of fraud and embezzlement of research funds, and in 2012 was found to have committed "deliberate scientific malpractice". In 2017 the University of Copenhagen revoked Penkowa's doctoral degree. As of 2020 Penkowa has had nine of her research publications retracted, and four others have received an expression of concern.
- Eric Poehlman (US), a former Professor in the Department of Medicine at the University of Vermont, was convicted in 2005 of grant fraud after falsifying data in as many as 17 grant applications between 1992 and 2000. He was the first academic in the United States to be jailed for falsifying data in a grant application. Poehlman has had seven of his publications retracted.
- Don Poldermans, a researcher at Erasmus Medical Center in the Netherlands. published studies from 1999 until the early 2010s claiming that Beta blocker should be administered before certain surgeries. European medical guidelines (and to a lesser extent US guidelines) recommended the practice during the years 2009 to 2013, guiding millions of surgeries. A 2012 inquiry found that he "used patient data without written permission, used fictitious data and… submitted to conferences [reports] which included knowingly unreliable data." Poldermans admitted the allegations. A 2014 meta-analysis reported that beta blockers increased mortality risk by 27 percent within 30 days of surgery.
- Anil Potti (US), a former Associate Professor of Medicine at Duke University, engaged in scientific misconduct "by including false research data in ... published papers, [a] submitted manuscript, [a] grant application, and the research record." Potti's misconduct resulted in the suspension of three clinical trials based on his research and a lawsuit filed against Duke by patients enrolled in those studies. As of 2021 Potti has had 11 of their research publications retracted, and one other paper has received an expression of concern.
- Jonathan Pruitt (US, Canada), a behavioral ecologist formerly at McMaster University, has been accused of using fabricated data in several research publications, with a group of over 20 scientists finding evidence of manipulated or fabricated numbers in several of Pruitt's publications. In 2021 Pruitt had his doctoral dissertation withdrawn by the University of Tennessee Knoxville. As of 2024 Pruitt has had 16 of his research publications retracted, 11 other papers have received an expression of concern, and four other papers have been corrected.
- Didier Raoult (France), a physician and microbiologist formerly at Aix-Marseille University, was accused of illegally conducting clinical experiments without proper approval from his university's ethics committee., and several of his publications have been reported for concerns of image duplication and image fabrication. As of 2026 Raoult has had 48 of his research publications retracted, making him the 12th most retracted scientist in the world Another 156 of his publications have received an expression of concern.
- Scott Reuben (US), a former Professor of Anesthesiology at Tufts University, falsified and fabricated clinical trials involving painkiller medications. Reuben pleaded guilty in 2010 to one count of health care fraud and was sentenced to six months in prison. As of 2023 Reuben has had 25 of his research publications retracted.
- Steven S. Rosenfeld (US), a former Harvard undergraduate, forged letters of recommendation for himself in the name of David Dressler, whose laboratory he used. His research on transfer factor, on which two articles were published in the Proceedings of the National Academy of Sciences and one article in Annals of Internal Medicine, could not be successfully replicated by other scientists.
- Alfred Steinschneider (US), a medical doctor formerly based at Upstate Medical University, in 1972 developed the theory, published in the journal Pediatrics that SIDS was caused by prolonged sleep apnea, although none of his research or research conducted subsequently by others supported the theory. The case-study upon which Steinschneider's theory was based was later revealed to involve infanticide committed by the mother, with Steinschneider allegedly having ignored evidence and reports that the children were being abused. In 1997 the editor of Pediatrics, Jerold Lucey, stated that Steinschneider's original paper on the subject was "seriously flawed" and should not have been published.
- Marc Straus (US), former Chief of Oncology and Associate Professor of Medicine at Boston University Medical Center, in 1982 admitted to "serious deficiencies", including the use of false data, in research studies he supervised. He also admitted to using ineligible patients in his studies, administering drug dosages different from those in his plan, and not assuring compliance with rules of informed consent.
- Jon Sudbø (Norway), an oncologist and former Associate Professor at the University of Oslo, was found in a 2006 investigation to have manipulated and fabricated data in grant applications and 15 of his research papers. As of 2023 Sudbø has had 14 of his publications retracted, and one other publication has received an expression of concern.
- William Summerlin (US), a dermatologist formerly at Memorial Sloan Kettering Cancer Center, in 1974 committed scientific misconduct in his work on transplant immunology. It was from this case that the phrase "painting the mice" originated as a synonym for research fraud.
- Marc Tessier-Lavigne, a neuroscientist, was the President of Stanford University. In 2022, the Stanford board of trustees opened an investigation into allegations that Tessier-Lavigne might have been involved in fabricating results in articles published between 2001 and 2008, when he was working at Genentech. In July 2023, the trustees' report was released, finding that in several papers he co-authored "there was apparent manipulation of research data by others." Tessier-Lavigne then announced that he would be stepping down as president of Stanford, effective August 31, 2023. As of 2024, Tessier-Lavigne has had four research publications retracted, and five others have received an expression of concern.
- Andrew Wakefield (UK), a former surgeon and senior lecturer at the Royal Free Hospital in London, was found guilty of dishonesty in his research on the MMR vaccine and banned from medicine by the UK General Medical Council following an investigation by Brian Deer of the Sunday Times. Wakefield's claims of a link between the MMR vaccine, autism and inflammatory bowel disease have been reported in the British Medical Journal as "based not on bad science but on a deliberate fraud", and the 1998 paper originally presenting his theory was retracted in 2010 by The Lancet. Wakefield was unsuccessful in an attempt to sue detractors/critics for libel and defamation. Wakefield has had two papers retracted and one corrected.
- Industrial Bio-Test Laboratories fabricated research data to the extent that upon FDA analysis of 867 studies, 618 (71%) were deemed invalid, including many of which were used to gain regulatory approval for widely used household and industrial products.
- The company Surgisphere claimed to have hospital data which was used to support studies of the effectiveness of hydroxychloroquine in treating COVID-19. Papers in the Lancet and New England Journal of Medicine were retracted in June 2020 when the data was found to be implausible.
- The National Centre for Biological Sciences, one of India's top research institutes and part of the Tata Institute of Fundamental Research, retracted one of its breakthrough scientific papers in 2021 describing the discovery of iron-sensing RNA after its findings and images were found to be manipulated.
- Eliezer Masliah (US), head of the Division of Neuroscience at the National Institute on Aging, was suspected in 2024 of having manipulated and inappropriately reused images in over 100 scientific papers spanning several decades, including those that were used by the FDA to greenlight testing for the experimental drug prasinezumab as a treatment for Parkinson's.
- Berislav Zlokovic (Serbia, US), a prominent neuroscientist at the University of Southern California, was placed on leave in 2023 amid concerns of scientific misconduct. Investigations revealed that several of his studies, which had generated promising data on Alzheimer's and stroke treatments, were under scrutiny for potential data manipulation. These studies formed the basis for drugs developed by ZZ Biotech, a company co-founded by Zlokovic. The allegations raised significant concerns about the validity of the research and the efficacy of the associated treatments. This narrative is a key component of Charles Piller's book, Doctored, which was published in 2025.
- Yakov Kuzyakov lost 4 papers because he edited his own papers in the Elsevier journal European Journal of Soil Biology. For three of these papers one of the reviewers was also closely linked to Y. Kuzyakov. He lost a fourth paper in a second Elsevier journal, Science of the Total Environment, due to suspicious changes in authors on the paper during the review process.
- Deborah F. Kelly
- Michael Briggs was a scientists who had faked results studying the contraceptive pill.

== Chemistry ==
- Leo Paquette (US), an Ohio State University professor, plagiarized sections from an unfunded NIH grant application for use in his own NIH grant application. He also plagiarized a NSF proposal for use in one of his scientific publications.
- Kenichiro Itami (Japan), Nagoya University professor, and other members of his laboratory committed scientific misconduct in the graphene nanoribbon fraud. As a result of that misconduct, in 2022 Itami and the other implicated lab members were banned from receiving research support from the Japan Society for the Promotion of Science for at least three years. As of 2023, Itami has had three of his research publications retracted, one other paper has received an expression of concern, and one other paper has been corrected. Itami was held responsible, and the Japan Science and Technology Agency (JST) and the Japan Society for the Promotion of Science (JSPS), which determine the allocation of government research funds, have stopped granting research funds as a penalty until the end of March 2025 from the university. Despite this, RIKEN, which is funded mainly by research fees from the government, hired Itami and obtained about 50 million yen in research funding. He pioneered a loophole that allowed him to obtain research funding by belonging to a national research corporation even if his research funding from the government was suspended due to research misconduct.
- The independent misconduct of two chemists at the William A. Hinton State Laboratory Institute in Massachusetts caused the drug lab to be shut down and tens of thousands of criminal convictions for drug possession to be overturned. Annie Dookhan admitted to faking test results and adulterating samples to make them consistent with her desired results. Sonja Farak admitted to stealing samples and using them to get high herself. The affairs were documented in the 2020 film How to Fix a Drug Scandal.
- Masaya Sawamura (Japan), science misconduct made a significant impact in the field of chemistry. Several of his academic papers were retracted due to concerns about manipulated or fabricated data. In 2022, the Chemistry group at Hokkaido University, where Sawamura is affiliated, retracted multiple papers, including one published in the journal Science in 2020. The retraction was attributed to the non-reproducibility of reported results and manipulation of nuclear magnetic resonance (NMR) spectra. Additionally, two papers by Sawamura's team, originally published in 2019 in the Journal of the American Chemical Society, were retracted due to the manipulation or fabrication of NMR spectra and HPLC charts.
- Bengü Sezen (US), a graduate student at Columbia University, was found to have falsified data in her research for over a decade by editing NMR data to fit her desired results. At least six of her research papers have been withdrawn and Columbia University has moved to revoke her Ph.D.
- Guido Zadel (Germany), a doctoral student at the University of Bonn, claimed to have observed enantioselectivity by conducting reactions immersed in a static magnetic field. After other researchers were unable to replicate his results, he confessed (and later retracted) to have spiked the reaction mixtures with pure enantiomers. His degree was stripped.

== Computer science and mathematics ==
- Ioan Mang (Romania), a computer scientist at the University of Oradea, plagiarized a paper by cryptographer Eli Biham, Dean of the Computer Science Department of Technion, Haifa, Israel. He was accused of extensive plagiarism in at least eight of his academic papers.
- Dănuț Marcu (Romania), a mathematician and computer scientist, was banned from publishing in several journals due to plagiarism. He had submitted a manuscript for publication that was a word-for-word copy of a published paper written by another author.
- In 2012, IEEE posted "Notice of Violation of IEEE Publication Principles" regarding a paper by Maruf Monwar, Waqar Haque and Padma Polash Paul presented at the 2007 Canadian Conference on Electrical and Computer Engineering. The paper "contains significant portions of original text" from three papers by others and was "copied with insufficient attribution (including appropriate references to the original author(s) and/or paper title) and without permission. Due to the nature of this violation, reasonable effort should be made to remove all past references to this paper, and future references should be made to the following article[sic]...."
- Tao Li, a computer science professor at the University of Florida, was accused of fabricating results and pushing his PhD student Huixiang Chen to keep pursuing a paper with false results at ISCA 2019. Mr. Chen committed suicide, and ACM and IEEE found Prof. Li guilty of pressuring him after a two-year investigation. University of Florida forced Prof. Li to retire from the university after the investigation by IEEE and ACM.

== Geology ==
- Vishwa Jit Gupta (India), a palaeontologist at the Panjab University, manipulated, faked and plagiarised data on the fossil records of the Himalayan region in publications between 1960s and 1980s. In a case known as the Himalayan fossil hoax, he was exposed by Australian geologist John Talent. Gupta had used fossil images from earlier records and fossil specimens from other parts of the world claiming that he found them at the Himalayas. Examination of his publications between 1969 and 1988 confirmed the misconduct. It was recorded as the "greatest scientific fraud of the century".

== Philosophy ==
- Magali Elise Roques (France), a philosopher and a chargé de recherche at the Centre National de la Recherche Scientifique (CNRS) in Paris, in 2020 became the subject of academic plagiarism inquiries. Several of her journal publications were subsequently retracted, with the journal Vivarium publishing a detailed retraction notice. A CNRS investigating committee reported that although the allegations of plagiarism against Roques were unjustified, "the whole body of [Roques'] work in English [...] is seriously flawed by the regular presence of bad scholarly practices, by what might be called a sort of active negligence". As of 2023, Roques has had 13 of her published articles retracted.
- Martin William Francis Stone, an Irish philosopher formerly at the Katholieke Universiteit Leuven, plagiarized in more than 40 publications.
- Peter Johannes Schulz, a philosopher working at the Institute of Communication and Health at the University of Lugano, had articles both in philosophy and communications retracted for plagiarism and failure to credit sources properly. After a minor sanction, he was reinstated by the university in 2017.
- Mahmoud Khatami, an Iranian philosopher at the University of Tehran, was subject to plagiarism accusations in 2014. A retraction for one article by Khatami due to plagiarism appeared in the philosophy journal Topoi, accompanied by an editorial by the journal editor that confirmed the existence of plagiarism.
- Julian Young's Friedrich Nietzsche: A Philosophical Biography (Cambridge University Press, 2010) contains passages plagiarized from an earlier biography by Curtis Cate. Young later had corrections and proper attribution to Cate's biography inserted into unsold copies of the book.

== Physics and engineering ==
- Ranga P. Dias (US), a physicist formerly at the University of Rochester, was in 2024 found by an investigatory committee to have committed research misconduct, including data fabrication and falsification, related to his work on alleged superconducting materials. A 2023 report in Science noted that at least 21% of Dias's 2013 doctoral thesis had been plagiarised. As of 2024, Dias has had five of his research papers retracted, and five other papers have received an expression of concern.
- Victor Ninov (US), a nuclear chemist formerly at Lawrence Berkeley National Laboratory, was dismissed from his position after falsifying his work on the discovery of elements 116 and 118.
- Jan Hendrik Schön (Germany, US), a researcher in the physics of semiconductors formerly employed by Bell Labs, forged results by using the same data sets for different and unrelated experiments. Schön has had 32 of his publications retracted.
- Rusi Taleyarkhan (US), a nuclear engineer at Purdue University, was found by a university committee in 2008 to have falsified his research.

== Plant biology ==
- Olivier Voinnet (France) was suspended in 2015 for two years from the CNRS (the French National Centre for Scientific Research) due to multiple cases of data manipulation. In 2016 EMBO recalled the Gold Medal awarded to Voinnet in 2009. As of 2023, Voinnet has had nine research publications retracted, five other papers have received an expression of concern, and 25 other papers have been corrected.

== Psychiatry ==
- William Meissner (1931–2010), a Jesuit priest and professor at Harvard Medical School, was accused of copying many passages and also structural elements from Ernest Wallwork in Meissner's book, The Ethical Dimension of Psychoanalysis: A Dialogue. The Boston Psychoanalytic Society's Committee on Ethics and Professional Standards concluded that Meissner's actions "represented a serious breach of professional and scholarly standards."

== Social sciences ==
- Mart Bax (Netherlands), former professor of political anthropology at the Vrije Universiteit, committed multiple acts of scientific misconduct including data fabrication, with a 2020 article in Ethnologia Europaea characterizing Bax's misconduct as "incredible and appalling." Bax, who as of 2020 has had nine of his research publications retracted, was found in 2013 to have never published 61 of the papers he listed on his CV.
- Bruno Frey (Switzerland), an economist formerly at the University of Zurich, in 2010–11 committed multiple acts of self-plagiarism in articles about the Titanic disaster. Frey admitted to the self-plagiarism, terming the acts "grave mistake[s]" and "deplorable."
- Karl-Theodor zu Guttenberg (Germany), former Minister of Defence of Germany, resigned from his office because of plagiarism in his doctoral dissertation from the University of Bayreuth. The university, which had awarded Guttenberg's dissertation with summa cum laude distinction, revoked his Ph.D. title on 23 February 2011, and Guttenberg resigned in March.
- Michael LaCour (US), former graduate student in political science at UCLA, was the lead author of the 2014 article "When contact changes minds". Published in Science and making international headlines, the paper was later retracted because of numerous irregularities in the methodology and falsified data. Following the retraction Princeton University rescinded an assistant professorship that had been offered to LaCour.
- Philippe Rushton (Canada), formerly of the Department of Psychology at the University of Western Ontario and former head of the white supremacist hate group Pioneer Fund, engaged in "research [that] was unethical, scientifically flawed, and based on racist ideas and agenda." As of 2023, six of Rushton's research publications had been retracted.
- Diederik Stapel (Netherlands), former professor of social psychology at Tilburg University, fabricated data in dozens of studies on human behaviour, a deception described by The New York Times as "an audacious academic fraud." Stapel has had 58 of his publications retracted.
- Brian Wansink (US), former John S. Dyson Endowed Chair in the Applied Economics and Management Department at Cornell University, was found in 2018 by a University investigatory committee to have "committed academic misconduct in his research and scholarship, including misreporting of research data, problematic statistical techniques, failure to properly document and preserve research results, and inappropriate authorship." As of 2020, Wansink has had 18 of his research papers retracted (one twice); seven other papers have received an expression of concern, and 15 others have been corrected.
- Francisco Gómez Camacho (Spain), a Jesuit priest and emeritus professor at Madrid's Comillas Pontifical University, has had three publications about the history of economic theories retracted due to plagiarism.
- Francesca Gino (US), a professor at Harvard Business School, was put on administrative leave after accusations surfaced that she had falsified data in multiple studies over a period of 10 years. As of 2024, five of Gino's research publications have been retracted.
- Dan Ariely (US), a professor at Duke University, had a paper retracted over concerns about data fabrication, in addition to several other controversies about his data.
- Marc Hauser (US), an evolutionary biologist and former Professor of psychology at Harvard University, was found by a University committee and the US Office of Research Integrity to have fabricated and falsified data in his research.
- Yannick Griep (Netherlands). Former associate professor of psychology at Radboud University was fired for fraudulent invoices at first, however, when the university further investigated it turned out that he also manipulated data. Mid 2026 the journal Group & Organization Management from SAGE, where Griep was an editor in chief, retracted 8 of his papers.
- Lorenza Colzato (Italy, Netherlands), a former Leiden University researcher, was found in 2022 to have conducted fraud in at least 15 published studies, including making changes to the research design, adding control groups afterward, and omitting data. Colzato was first accused of fraud in 2019, when she was found to have illegally withdrawn blood from test subjects and had two of her publications retracted as a result. As of 2023 Colzato has had eight of her research publications retracted and two others have received an expression of concern.

== Other ==
- Cistercian historian Louis Lekai called attention to "a major case of modern plagiarism" when in 1959 he proved that almost all of Louis Dubois' influential biography of Abbot Armand Jean de Rancé, published in 1867, was copied from an unpublished manuscript by Francois Armand Gervaise.
- In 2016 the scientific publisher Springer Nature retracted 58 papers from seven journals, authored mostly by Iran-based researchers, because the papers showed evidence of authorship manipulation, peer-review manipulation, and/or plagiarism.
- Ohio University in 2006 alleged more than three dozen cases of plagiarism in master's degree theses dating back 20 years in its mechanical engineering department. A former faculty member involved in the plagiarism cases, Jay S. Gunasekera, was removed from his position as department chair, had his title of "distinguished professor" rescinded, and in 2011 settled a lawsuit he had brought against the university. Another former faculty member implicated in the plagiarism cases, Bhavin Mehta, in 2012 lost a defamation suit he had brought against the university.
- 486 Chinese cancer researchers were found guilty of engaging in a fraudulent peer-review scheme by China's Ministry of Science and Technology. The investigation was initiated after the retraction of 107 papers published in Tumor Biology between 2012 and 2016. This is reported to be the most papers retracted from one journal.
- An investigation by the UK scientific journal Nature published on 8 January 2020, found that eight James Cook University (JCU) studies on the effect of climate change on coral reef fish, one of which was authored by the JCU educated discredited scientist Oona Lönnstedt, had a 100 percent replication failure and thus none of the findings of the original eight studies were found to be correct. The Swedish scientists Josefin Sundin and Fredrik Jutfelt were the first to report their suspicions to Uppsala University. Their informal investigation, and the proofs they collected, lead to the formal investigation. Concerns raised about a study Lönnstedt published while at JCU between 2010 and 2014 included an improbable number of lionfish claimed to have been used in this study, and images of 50 fish provided which appeared to include multiple images of some biological specimens, and two images that had been flipped making two fish appear to be four. Lönnstedt had also been found guilty of fabricating data underpinning a study at Uppsala University in Sweden following her departure from JCU in Queensland, Australia. The study was subsequently retracted.
- Ashok Pandey was the editor and then editor-in-chief of Elsevier's journal Bioresource Technology for over a decade. During his time as editor in chief he used his position to add his name to papers he edited. By 2025, 43 of the research papers he co-authored in the journal were retracted, as Elsevier discovered that he added his name in those papers and violated the journal's policies in the peer review process. In most of his papers, he added his named after he received the manuscripts, and then handled the entire peer reviewing. Elsevier also retracted several papers by different researchers which Pandey edited and handled the reviewing, but Pandey's name was there in the initial manuscripts and the authors were his collaborators in many of his publications.

== See also ==
- Retraction Watch (2010–)
- Research Integrity Risk Index
- List of scholarly publishing stings
