= Elias Alsabti =

Iraqi medical researcher (1954–1990)

Elias Abdel Kuder Alsabti (1954–1990) was an Iraqi medical researcher who was exposed for scientific fraud.

== Life ==
Alsabti built a career as an impostor. In Iraq, he claimed to have made a breakthrough in cancer research, winning a large grant from the government. He obtained a generous scholarship from the Jordanian government and, pretending to be a member of the Jordanian royal family, in 1977 moved to the United States. In the late 1970s, he worked as a cancer specialist for various American research institutions, moving on when his utter lack of knowledge and understanding was noticed. He reworked articles from lesser known scientific journals into entries that he submitted for publication elsewhere. He is estimated to have published 50 to 60 plagiarized articles in a few years, many of them in reputable journals, often with co-authors who have never published with anyone but him, which led to the suspicion that they may not exist.

Several journals retracted publications after the fraud was exposed. Regardless, Alsabti managed to pass his medical examination in Indiana in 1981, without having completed any medical school or prior residency. He thereafter completed 9 months of residency, obtained U.S. citizenship, and opened a private practice in Pennsylvania. He applied for medical licenses in Arkansas, Nebraska, Washington, and Massachusetts. In Massachusetts, where he had previously been uncovered, his license was suspended in 1986 and again in 1988. At the time of his death, from an auto accident in South Africa in 1990, he still had a Pennsylvania medical license and a well-regarded private practice there.

== See also ==
- List of scientific misconduct incidents

== External resource ==
- William J. Broad (1980). "Would-Be Academician Pirates Papers: Five of his published papers are demonstrable plagiarisms, and more than 55 others are suspect". Science. 208 (4451): 1438–1440. Bibcode:1980Sci...208.1438B. doi:10.1126/science.208.4451.1438. PMID 17796686.
- Anonymous (1980). "An outbreak of piracy in the literature". Nature. 285 (5765): 429–430. Bibcode:1980Natur.285Q.429.. doi:10.1038/285429a0.
- Nicholas Wade and William Broad. Betrayers of the Truth: Fraud and Deceit in the Halls of Science. New York: Simon & Schuster, 1983, pp. 38–59.
