= Leadon =

Leadon is a surname. Notable people with the surname include:

- Bernie Leadon (born 1947), American musician
- Steven A. Leadon, professor
- Tom Leadon (1952–2023), American musician

== See also ==
- River Leadon, river in Herefordshire and Gloucestershire, England, a tributary of the River Severn
