= Eric Poehlman =

American scientist

Eric T. Poehlman (born c. 1956), is an American scientist, formerly researching in the field of human obesity and aging. In 2000, Poehlman was investigated for scientific misconduct; the case continued for several years and in 2005, he admitted to fraudulent research practices. He had published research using falsified and fabricated data in studies on aging metabolism and obesity, including purporting to show beneficial effects on lipid profiles and abdominal fat in menopausal women being treated with hormone therapy. Poehlman became the first academic in the United States to be jailed for falsifying data in a grant application.

== Career ==
He joined the University of Vermont (UVM) College of Medicine in 1987 as an assistant professor, later working for three years at the University of Maryland in Baltimore. He eventually returned to UVM as a full professor. Poehlman built a reputation as one of the leading authorities on the metabolic changes that come with aging, particularly during menopause; he published more than 200 journal articles over two decades of research. His papers included research on the genetics of obesity and the impact of exercise, often following human subjects over time to document changes in their physiology.

== Scientific misconduct ==
His stellar career unravelled when Poehlman's misconduct was detected and exposed by a former UVM lab technician, Walter DeNino, who once viewed Poehlman as his mentor. Poehlman was accused of scientific misconduct and on March 17, 2005 pleaded guilty to the charges, acknowledging falsifying 17 grant applications to the National Institutes of Health and fabricating data in ten of his papers that were submitted between 1992 and 2000. On June 28, 2006, Poehlman was ordered to serve a year and a day in federal prison for using falsified data in federal research grants that he submitted for funding. In a plea bargain that he made with the prosecutors, Poehlman pleaded guilty with one $542,000 grant; the government prosecutors stated that Poehlman had defrauded agencies out of $2.9 million.

In a media release from the U.S. Department of Justice, the District of Vermont's U.S. Attorney was quoted: "Dr. Poehlman fraudulently diverted millions of dollars", said David V. Kirby. "This in turn siphoned millions of dollars from the pool of resources available for valid scientific research proposals. As this prosecution proves, such conduct will not be tolerated."

== Aftermath ==
Before imposing the sentence, Judge William Sessions III said "I generally think deterrence is significant, perhaps more so in this case. The scientific community may be watching." Sessions reprimanded Poehlman for his misconduct, saying he had "violated the public trust." In addition to jail time, Poehlman was permanently barred from receiving further federal research grants and was ordered by the court to write letters of retraction and correction to several scientific journals.

The website Retraction Watch found in 2015 that four of the ten papers found by the U.S. Office of Research Integrity to have falsified or fabricated data had yet to be retracted by the scientific journals they had been published in. In 2017, they reported that the final fraudulent paper had been withdrawn.

He later worked on the South shore of Montreal as an academic adviser for Champlain Regional College.

== See also ==
- List of scientific misconduct incidents
