= Steven S. Rosenfeld =

Steven S. Rosenfeld (born 1953) is an American biochemist and former researcher, who was found to have published irreproducible research, as well as having forged recommendations for himself. This was one of the first events which brought the issue of scientific misconduct to the attention of the scientific community and the American public.

== Scientific misconduct ==
Rosenfeld was a Harvard undergraduate (Class of 1975) doing research on transfer factor in the laboratory of Dr. David Dressler. His research showed that a subcellular fraction prepared from cells of the immune system of an animal having cell-mediated immunity to the hapten dinitrochlorobenzene could transfer that specific immunity to a second, previously non-immune animal. Further it showed that the active component of this transfer factor appeared to be RNA.

It was soon discovered that Rosenfeld had forged various letters of recommendation for himself and signed Dressler's name to them. This led to re-examination of Rosenfeld's experiments, which could not be successfully repeated by other scientists. Two articles describing Rosenfeld's research on transfer factor had been published in Proceedings of the National Academy of Sciences. Subsequently, Dressler published an Authors' Statement "about the existence and nature of 'transfer factor'" in this same journal, making a "statement of uncertainty and potential retraction with our sincere apologies". Similarly, an article published in Annals of Internal Medicine was withdrawn.

This incident, along with the contemporary falsification of data by William Summerlin at Memorial Sloan Kettering Cancer Center, was one of the first events which brought the issue of scientific misconduct to the attention of the scientific community and the American public.
