= Silvia Bulfone-Paus =

Italian immunologist

Silvia Bulfone-Paus (born Silvia Bulfone) is an Italian immunologist. She is the chair of the Research Center Borstel's Department of Immunology and Cell Biology and also serves as professor of Immunobiology at the University of Manchester School of Medicine.

Her lab at Research Center Borstel was downsized in 2010 after several investigations into scientific misconduct at her lab. Thirteen papers that she authored were retracted as a result of those investigations.

== Career ==
Bulfone-Paus specializes her research in the biology of the immune response, especially cytokines and mast cells. Mast cells secrete a substance known as histamine, which produces inflammation. Cytokines are small molecules made of amino acids. These cell-signaling molecules play a role in the immune response and include interferons and interleukins.

=== Scientific misconduct investigations ===
After charges of scientific misconduct in Bulfone-Paus's immunology department, an external investigation was launched July 2010. Anonymous whistleblower(s) began a campaign against Bulfone-Paus and her husband, emailing the investigators, other scientists, and politicians, alerting them to instances of fraud in Bulfone-Paus’ laboratory.

The investigation committee found that two former post-doctoral students in the lab were guilty of using pictures from unrelated experiments to support their findings in six papers written between 2001 and 2009. Bulfone-Paus was listed as either the senior or corresponding author on all six of the publications. The committee found that Bulfone-Paus bore "substantial responsibility" for the manipulations as their supervisor.

The Research Centre Borstel believed a more extensive investigation was warranted and commenced its own internal investigation. In December 2010, officials at the research center made it known they were asking for the retraction of six further papers, written between 1999 and 2005, all authored or co-authored by Silvia Bulfone-Paus. In response to the findings of their investigation, the Research Centre Borstel downsized Bulfone-Paus’ laboratory and decreased the funding of the lab.

In June 2010, the University of Lübeck, in Germany, began investigations into six papers authored by Bulfone-Paus’ husband, Ralf Paus. Of the six articles in question, Bulfone-Paus was listed as co-author on five of them. Neither of the post-doctoral students were listed as co-authors.

In December 2010, the journal Transplantation stated they were retracting another of Bulfone-Paus’ papers. The article, published in 2000, was retracted because of “inaccurate information” for two figures contained in the paper. The post-doctoral students were not listed as contributing authors.

In December 2012, Germany's main research funding agency DFG completed its investigation into Bulfone-Paus’ laboratory and found that Bulfone-Paus was grossly negligent in her supervision and retroactively sanctioned her from applying for funding for three years.

== Personal life ==
Bulfone-Paus is married to Ralf Paus, a professor in Dermatology at the University of Münster in Germany. Paus also holds a position as Professor of Cutaneous Medicine at the University of Manchester. Bulfone-Paus and Paus have three children.

== See also ==
- List of scientific misconduct incidents
