= Sophie Jamal =

Canadian endocrinologist

- Born: Abida Sophina Jamal; June 6, 1966 (age 60)
- Known for: Biomedical research fraud
- Medical career
- Field: Endocrinology
- Research: Osteoporosis treatment
- Notable works: Effect of Nitroglycerin Ointment on Bone Density and Strength in Postmenopausal Women: A Randomized Trial (2011)

Abida Sophie Jamal (born on 6 June 1966) is a Canadian endocrinologist and former osteoporosis researcher who was at the centre of a scientific misconduct case in the mid-to-late 2010s. Jamal published a high-profile paper suggesting that the heart medication nitroglycerin was a treatment for osteoporosis, and was later demonstrated to have misrepresented her results. She received a lifetime ban from receiving funding from the Canadian Institutes of Health Research and was named directly in their disclosure report, becoming the first person mentioned by name by the institute for scientific misconduct. Jamal was later stripped of her medical license for two years, regaining it in a controversial 3–2 decision.

== Early life and career ==
Jamal was born 6 June 1966. She graduated from medical school at the University of Toronto in 1991 and completed a residency in internal medicine and endocrinology in 1996. In 2002, she additionally completed a Ph.D. at the University of Toronto in the field of osteoporosis-related clinical epidemiology. She spent a short period in the 1990s at the University of California, San Francisco, working under osteoporosis expert Steven Cummings. Jamal later described her parents and upbringing as "overbearing", instilling the need to present a facade of academic and professional success at all times.

In 2007, Jamal was appointed as a staff member at the Women's College Hospital and as a scientist at its research institute, becoming the head of endocrinology and director of osteoporosis research. She was also an associate professor at the University of Toronto. Jamal was respected by her peers and thought of as a researcher of "high moral standing and high ethics". She was recognized as an expert on osteoporosis and its treatment by both the medical and general communities, for which she received media coverage. A particular focus of said coverage was her role as a woman in science, where she was treated as a spokeswoman for women's medical concerns.

Jamal began research on whether nitrates could prevent or treat osteoporosis in 1998, while working under Cummings at UCSF. Her first trial to test a nitrate drug against placebo was published in 2004 and had positive findings. Jamal's most famous study, a paper on the use of nitroglycerin in osteoporosis, was published in 2011 with collaborators Cummings and Richard Eastell. The study claimed to find that nitroglycerin was a safe and effective treatment of and preventative for osteoporosis, increasing the bone density of elderly women in the most vulnerable skeletal regions to the disease. Due to the potentially dangerous side effects of common osteoporosis treatments, Jamal's findings were hailed as impressive progress in the field, drawing the attention of major medical establishments such as the Mayo Clinic. As a result, Jamal was granted nearly CA$260,000 to fund a follow-up study in 2012. She was also awarded the 2012 CSEM Young Investigator Award, a CA$20,000 grant from the Canadian Society of Endocrinology and Metabolism.

== Misconduct controversy ==
The additional scrutiny brought upon Jamal's 2011 paper by the follow-up study revealed inconsistencies that had not been previously noticed. Jamal's collaborator Richard Eastell found discrepancies between the raw data and her descriptions in reports she sent him. When Eastell conducted his own statistical analysis in 2014, he found no difference between the treatment and placebo groups. When questioned about the discrepancies, Jamal blamed a research assistant for inaccurately presenting the data. She later took to physical measures to try cover up the fraud; Jamal changed files in patient records, destroyed an old computer of hers to prevent fraud investigators from accessing it, and modified the temperature controls to destroy blood and urine specimens stored at Canadian Blood Services and prevent their analysis.

Following investigation by the Women's College Hospital, Jamal was deemed to have manipulated data and misrepresented her findings. She resigned from her positions at the clinic and the University of Toronto in 2015. One member of the investigative panel defined the case as possibly the "worst case of research fraud dealt with by the college in its history". That December, her paper on nitroglycerin was retracted by JAMA, the journal of the American Medical Association and its original publisher. The follow-up "Nitrates and Bone Turnover" trial was cancelled. In 2016, Jamal was barred from ever receiving funding in the future from the Canadian Institutes of Health Research or from any other Canadian source of federal research funding, and forced to pay back the sum she received in 2012. She became the first scientist mentioned by name by the institute for fraud, which had previously redacted the names of sanctioned researchers for confidentiality reasons.

Following the JAMA retraction, two further papers of Jamal's were retracted; one on the risk of osteoporosis in kidney disease, and one on nitrate use and bone density. These retractions related to her work with the Canadian Multicentre Osteoporosis Study, which launched an independent investigation following the results of the Women's College Hospital investigation. Jamal had been their study's site coordinator in Toronto. In both cases, all authors except Jamal supported retraction of the papers, while she was unable to be reached for comment. A fourth retraction on another paper regarding kidney disease and bone fracture risk was announced in August 2021. The fourth retraction was unconnected to the investigations into Jamal's research, but requested by her co-authors after independently analysing the study data and finding inconsistencies.

== Medical licensing ==
In 2017, Jamal's medical licence was restricted by the College of Physicians and Surgeons of Ontario. A year later, she was entirely stripped of her licence. In February 2020, Jamal applied for the reinstatement of her licence. She ascribed her actions to mental health issues, particularly depression, related to her strict and achievement-focused upbringing. While the Women's College Hospital opposed the reinstatement, the disciplinary panel reinstated her licence with the condition that she remain in therapy for her mental health and restrict her practice to clinical work rather than research.

Jamal's reinstatement, a 3–2 decision, was opposed by the panel's chairman and castigated by the media. Peeter Poldre, professor emeritus of medicine at the University of Toronto and president of the College of Physicians and Surgeons of Ontario, had "significant concerns" about Jamal's "sense of decency, integrity, and honesty" and believed she had failed to deal with the professional and personal consequences of her misconduct.

== See also ==
- List of scientific misconduct incidents
