= H.M. Krishna Murthy =

H.M. Krishna Murthy is a former researcher from the University of Alabama at Birmingham. In 2009, several of his publications were retracted from scientific journals after accusations of scientific misconduct surfaced. UAB began investigating claims of fraud in January 2007 after the validity of the proteins came into question. The university's probe produced ten publications that were shown not to be valid. These publications have since been retracted from their respective journals. Murthy's publications dealt with the crystal structures of several proteins that he had claimed to have determined using crystallographic methods. It was found that these protein structures were never properly determined and the primary crystallographic data for at least some of them have been fabricated by Murthy.

== Professional career ==
In 1981, Murthy began his work with protein crystallography as a post doctoral researcher at Yale University. While he was researching there, Murthy worked under renowned crystallographer Thomas Steitz. The research Murthy did while at Yale is regarded as genuine. In 1998, Murthy began working at the University of Alabama at Birmingham. There, he was a research assistant professor in the Center for Biophysical Sciences and Engineering.

== Protein structure fabrication scandal ==
In 2007, H.M. Krishna Murthy was working as a researcher at the University of Alabama at Birmingham when questions regarding the authenticity of his work surfaced. European crystallographers were looking into some of the structures that Dr. Murthy had claimed to have solved and began to see issues. Graduate students in the Netherlands working under Dr. Piet Gros also spotted problems throughout Murthy's work. Gros pointed out the many missing layers throughout the structure of C3B. When asked to provide further information about the structures, Dr. Murthy could not provide enough information to prove their validity. Gros and several other scientists decided to check the work and discovered unrealistic and physically impossible data. After receiving this information, the university decided to launch an investigation of their own. A committee of experts (appointed by the University of Alabama at Birmingham) in the field with no conflicting interests looked into the case and determined that the structures were more than likely fabricated. The group discovered that these structures defied many physical and chemical laws, further proving that these protein structures were fictitious. The team looking into the fraud suggested that the structures be removed from the public record.

In total, twelve of H.M. Krishna Murthy's structures and ten of his papers were affected by this scandal. The papers were retracted by their respective journals and upon retraction. All of the structures have been removed from the Protein Data Bank. The protein structures in question were 1BEF, 1CMW, 1DF9, 2QID, 1G40, 1G44, 1L6L, 2OU1, 1RID, 1Y8E, 2A01, and 2HR0. Murthy's falsified data ended up affecting 449 papers. These papers covered a range of topics; everything from dengue to Taq DNA polymerase.

The UAB investigation turned up significant amounts of data proving Murthy falsified these protein structures. In multiple instances, they found impossible electron densities and highly unlikely geometries. Furthermore, they found inconsistencies in the data indicative of computer generated information. In some cases, the information Murthy cited as proof of the structures was not a piece of original work. This confirmed the fictitious nature of his structures by showing that he had used another protein as a model for his creation. Specifically, Murthy tried to pass some elements of a known structure of TAQ polymerase (PDB entry 1TAQ) as a new structure (PDB entry 1CMW). When the misconduct inquiry looked for Murthy's work on several of these proteins, no experimental data was made available to them. Most significantly, no one has been able to experimentally support any of Murthy's structures.

Murthy's most famous fraudulent structure was 1BEF. Published in 1999 and retracted in 2009, 1BEF was cited in over ninety publications. 1BEF was first mentioned in a now retracted article from The Journal of Biological Chemistry. Murthy claimed 1BEF could be used as a potential treatment option for patients with dengue and other flaviviral proteases. The UAB team that investigated Murthy's publications said that 1BEF is “an improbable structure…[with] an unacceptable level of inter-atomic clashing.”

== Aftermath ==
Murthy claimed he did not commit any misconduct, however most scientists agree that the evidence against him indicated otherwise. Murthy's contract with the University of Alabama at Birmingham expired in February 2009, shortly after his fabrication of data became known to the university. The university chose not to renew the contract, ending their involvement with Murthy and he has not published since the scandal was uncovered.

In 2018, it was reported that the United States Office of Research Integrity had banned Murthy from any US government funded research for 10 years.

== See also ==
- List of scientific misconduct incidents
