= Robert A. Good =

American physician (1922–2003)

Robert Good
- Dr. Robert A. Good (right) at the White House in 1973 with (left to right) Benno Schmidt, President Richard Nixon, and Dr. R. L. Clark (M.D. Anderson Cancer Center). The occasion was the Conquest of Cancer Program, part of the war on cancer.
- Born: May 21, 1922; Crosby, Minnesota
- Died: June 13, 2003 (aged 81); St. Petersburg, Florida
- Education: University of Minnesota (M.D., Ph.D, 1947)
- Known for: Performed the first successful human bone marrow transplant
- Scientific career
- Fields: Immunology
- Workplaces: University of Minnesota; Rockefeller Institute for Medical Research; Sloan-Kettering Institute for Cancer Research; Oklahoma Medical Research Foundation; Cornell University Medical College; University of Oklahoma; All Children's Hospital in St. Petersburg; University of South Florida

Robert Alan Good NAM, NAS, AAAS (May 21, 1922 – June 13, 2003) was an American physician who performed the first successful human bone marrow transplant between persons who were not identical twins. He is regarded as a founder of modern immunology.

== Early life and education ==
Good was born in Crosby, Minnesota, the second son of Ethel (née Whitcomb) and Roy Homer Good, who worked as educators. He attended the University of Minnesota and its medical school, receiving a B.A. degree in 1944, and M.D. and Ph.D. degrees in 1947. He was the first student to undertake a combined M.D.-Ph.D. curriculum at Minnesota.

While an undergraduate, he developed a polio-like illness that left him partially paralyzed. His mother pushed his wheelchair into his medical school classrooms. He eventually recovered from the illness, but retained a pronounced limp for the remainder of his life.

== Research career ==
After obtaining his M.D. and Ph.D. degrees, Good undertook clinical training in pediatrics at the University of Minnesota Hospitals. After a fellowship year at the Rockefeller Institute for Medical Research, he returned to the University of Minnesota Medical School in 1950, where he engaged in research on the immune system. He was promoted in 1962 to the rank of professor in pediatrics, microbiology and pathology, and later also served as head of the Department of Pathology. In 1969, he was appointed as Regent's Professor, one of the highest recognitions of the University of Minnesota.

Among his accomplishments, in 1962, he documented the importance of the thymus gland, in 1965 he documented the important role of the tonsils in developing the immune defense systems of mammals including humans, and in 1968 he led the team that performed the first successful human bone marrow transplant between persons who were not identical twins. The patient who received the transplant was a 5-month-old boy with a profound immune deficiency that had earlier led to the deaths of eleven male members of his extended family. The boy received bone marrow transplanted from his 8-year-old sister. The transplant was successful and the boy grew up to become a healthy adult.

In 1972 he went to New York City to become president of the Sloan-Kettering Institute for Cancer Research. At Sloan-Kettering he continued his research into the human immune system. He remained at Sloan-Kettering until 1982, but his tenure there was marred by the discovery in 1974 of serious scientific fraud perpetrated by William T. Summerlin, a member of his lab who had previously worked with him at Minnesota. In 1982, he moved to the Cancer Research Program at the Oklahoma Medical Research Foundation in Oklahoma City, where he remained until 1985, when he became physician-in-chief at the All Children's Hospital in St. Petersburg, Florida, and chairman of pediatrics at The University of South Florida Medical School.

== Academy and Institute memberships ==
Good was a member of the National Academy of Sciences (elected 1970), the American Academy of Arts and Sciences, and a charter member of the Institute of Medicine.

== Personal life ==
Good died from esophageal cancer at age 81 in St. Petersburg, Florida. He was survived at the time by Noorbibi K. Day-Good, his second wife, five children from his first marriage to Jean Good, two step-children and 17 grandchildren.

== Awards ==
- 1955 E. Mead Johnson Award
- 1970 Albert Lasker Award for Clinical Medical Research
- 1970 Gairdner Foundation International Award.Gairdner Awardees
- 1970 Golden Plate Award of the American Academy of Achievement
- 1972 American College of Physicians Award
- 1975 Cancer Research Institute William B. Coley Award
- 1987 John Howland Award
