= Deep canvassing =

Form of political campaigning

Deep canvassing is a structured interview that uses long empathic conversations with the intention of shifting participant's beliefs. Though deep canvassing emerged from traditional political canvassing, it has been shown to be an effective way to change political beliefs, having been used by researchers and activists for over a decade to garner support for political and/or social ideologies. Deep canvassing has been used for years to gain traction for issues surrounding the LGBTQ+ community, animal rights, and racial justice. Deep canvassing follows a more empathetic approach compared to traditional canvassing. These techniques are deployed during political campaigns and can be used with any form of activism. Persuasion is not necessary when a deep canvasser comes knocking on your door. With an open-ended question approach, these canvassers engage in active listening, rather than a quick pitch for voter support. The end result is one that allows one another to gain understanding and build trust.

== History ==
The idea originated in 2008, at the Los Angeles LGBT Center's Leadership Lab, when staffers decided to talk to people who voted against same sex marriage to understand them better. After deep canvassing was adapted for phone banking in a successful pro-marriage-equality campaign in Minnesota, Leadership Lab staffers Steve Deline, Ella Barrett, and David Fleischer enlisted professors David Broockman and Josh Kalla to study the efficacy of the tactic.

Deep canvassing was used by People's Action in the 2020 United States presidential election because of its efficacy in persuasion, democracy, and ethics. Prior to the election, deep canvassing was promoted as an inclusive, value-based, communication strategy that works as a strong means of political persuasion—this is because of its ability to extend a path into advocation for change through like-minded social groups, its ability to position voters as a central facet of community organizing, and its effectiveness.

== Effectiveness ==
In 2014, a paper by Michael J. LaCour, "When contact changes minds", was released showing that longer and 'deeper' conversation can change minds but was retracted the following year for having falsified data.

Kalla and Broockman's study, published in 2016, found that ten minute conversations did have an impact on residents’ views of transgender issues.

In 2017, Kalla and Broockman published another study that found brief door-to-door canvassing, had nearly zero effect on voting choices. Of their six studies, Kalla and Brookman have found that deep canvassing does have measurable effects.

Deep canvassing has been shown to be effective in person and over the phone.

In 2017, Changing the Conversation Together was launched as an organization of concerned citizens building a national corps of deep canvassers. This volunteer based and professionally-led organization helped flip Staten Island in 2018 and Pennsylvania in 2020.

People's Action Deep Canvass Political Persuasion Experiment worked with both David Broockman and Josh Kalla to determine the efficacy of the deep canvassing approach. Canvassers used a two-way communication method via phone calls, where they wanted to know the voters relevant and emotionally significant experiences. This built the script for more canvassers to use later on. The voters responded better with a "Pro-Biden" message, rather than an "Anti-Trump" message. The experiment concluded with an overall addition of 3.1 votes for each 100 calls towards President Biden's vote margin in 2020.

== Process ==
Deep canvassing typically begins by building rapport with participants. Then, the canvasser tells a story of significance to the topic at hand, and lastly the participant's experiences are explored.

Brennan and Jackson studied the dialogical process of deep canvassing. They worked with Showing Up for Racial Justice New York City (SUFRJNYC) and studied the organization's facilitation of a deep canvassing conversation about reparations for Black Americans. The canvassing conversation was semi-structured and followed the initial script given to the canvassers. Participants were first asked to rate their initial attitudes about reparations on a numerical scale of 1–10. The conversations with participants included asking about their life experiences and that informed their current beliefs. The canvassers were encouraged to actively listen to the participants, tell personal stories, and avoid using facts in their conversations.

Formulating a script is the key component to engaging households while deep canvassing. The topic of race may tend to be subjective to most. SURJ-NYC explores the qualitative examination of dialogical elements in the Anti-Racist Deep Canvassing Conversations. The results show a range of experiences such as Interpersonal Agreement, InterVoice Dynamics, Authoring the Self and the other, and Bringing in personal Experience.

There was also found to be four process themes of deep canvassing when performing data analysis of canvassing conversations; these themes were Interpersonal agreement, Intervoice dynamics, Authoring the self and the other, and Personal experience. Interpersonal agreement develops mutual and shared understanding and confirms this as a major component during a deep canvassing conversation. This form of experience can show a participant may midjudge the agreement with the canvasser, or there is a sense of agreement that disinhibits racism. InterVoice dynamics comprise two subthemes that observe hidden dialogue and maintaining the balance between voices. Authoring the Self and the Other is an elaboration of understanding someone.

While not confirmed by the study due to its exploratory nature, Brennan and Jackson found evidence that cognitive dissonance and perspective-taking were important concepts that may play a role in deep canvassing.

Neighbours United, based in Canada, has a playbook and toolkit with some information on how deep canvassing is performed. Their website also includes deep canvassing scripts on climate change, clean energy, and nature-based policies that are available for downloading.

== See also ==
- Political campaigning
