= Dong-Pyou Han =

Dong-Pyou Han, born in Seoul, South Korea, is a former assistant professor of biomedical sciences at Iowa State University who resigned his post there in October 2013. In December 2013, it was revealed that he had added human blood components to rabbit blood to make it appear as though a vaccine he was working on had exhibited anti-HIV activity. As a result of this apparent positive result, Han and his team received approximately $19 million in grant money from the National Institutes of Health. After Han's fraud came to light, James Bradac, who oversees AIDS grants for the National Institutes of Health, called it "the worst case of research fraud he’d seen in his more than two decades at the agency," according to the New York Daily News.

In June 2014, as a result of his receiving grant money due to falsified results, Han was indicted on four federal felony counts of making false statements. Han pleaded guilty in federal court in February 2015. On 1 July 2015 Han was sentenced to 57 months imprisonment for fabricating and falsifying data in HIV vaccine trials. He was also fined US$7.2 million and will be subject to three years of supervised release after he leaves prison.

== See also ==
- List of scientific misconduct incidents
