= Moon Hyung-in =

South Korean medicinal biotechnologist

Moon Hyung-In is a professor at Dong-A University in Busan, South Korea. He is a member of the Department of Medicinal Biotechnology, and he earned his PhD in the Department of Pharmacy at Sungkyunkwan University in 2001.

Moon was discovered in 2012 to have published a number of articles in academic journals by writing the peer review reports for them himself. He submitted manuscripts to journals that allowed authors to suggest their own reviewers: he used false names and email addresses that he controlled, and he then submitted his own (glowing) reviews. The articles were subsequently retracted when the nature of his submissions was discovered; he reportedly acknowledged falsifying data in his papers.

== List of retracted articles ==
Pharmaceutical Biology

- Pharmaceutical Biology 2011 49:2, 190–193

Journal of Enzyme Inhibition and Medicinal Chemistry

- Journal of Enzyme Inhibition and Medicinal Chemistry [epub ahead of print], 2012, doi: 10.3109/14756366.2011.641014
- Journal of Enzyme Inhibition and Medicinal Chemistry [epub ahead of print], 2012, doi: 10.3109/14756366.2011.615746
- Journal of Enzyme Inhibition and Medicinal Chemistry 2010 25:5, 608-614
- Journal of Enzyme Inhibition and Medicinal Chemistry 2010 25:3, 391-393

International Journal of Food Sciences and Nutrition

- Retracted Paper: International Journal of Food Sciences and Nutrition 2012; 63(5): 537–547, doi: 10.3109/09637486.2011.607801
- Retracted Paper: International Journal of Food Sciences and Nutrition 2011; 62(2): 102–105, doi: 10.3109/09637486.2010.513682
- Retracted Paper: International Journal of Food Sciences and Nutrition 2011; 62(3): 215–218, doi: 10.3109/09637486.2010.503187

The Journal of Ethnopharmacology

- Retracted Paper: Journal of Ethnopharmacology 2005; 97(3): 21: Pages 567–571, doi: 10.1016/j.jep.2005.01.006

FEBS Letters

- Retracted Paper: FEBS Letters 2006; 580(3): 769–774, doi: 10.1016/j.febslet.2005.12.094

Phytotherapy Research

- Phytotherapy Research 2006; 20(8): 714-716, doi 10.1002/ptr.1941
- Phytotherapy Research 2005; 19(3): 239–242, doi 10.1002/ptr.1682

=== Additional list of 20 more retracted papers ===
The list of these papers has been reported on Retraction Watch.

== See also ==
- List of scientific misconduct incidents
