= William Summerlin =

American dermatologist engaged in scientific fraud (born 1938)

- Born: 1938 (age 87–88)
- Occupations: dermatologist, medical researcher
- Known for: perpetrated scientific fraud

William T. Summerlin (born 1938) is a dermatologist and medical researcher who engaged in scientific fraud involving his claims of successful skin transplantation without immunosuppression. Scientists were unable to replicate Summerlin's results, which drew scrutiny. A lab assistant noticed that one of the white lab mice that was supposed to have a dark patch of skin successfully grafted onto it had fur that was colored with ink from a felt-tip pen. An investigation of Summerlin's research ultimately led to the termination of his employment at Memorial Sloan-Kettering Cancer Center.

The New York Times called this a "medical Watergate", and the Los Angeles Times described it as one of the most "notable example(s) of fraudulent scientific research". The phrase "painting the mice" became synonymous with research fraud.

== Career ==
Summerlin began working at Stanford University in 1967, transferred to the University of Minnesota in 1973 and to Memorial Sloan-Kettering Cancer Center by 1974.

At a 1969 conference of dermatologists, Summerlin announced that eight patients at Stanford University successfully received skin grafts grown from cells in test tubes over six weeks old.

In 1973, from the University of Minnesota, Summerlin announced that he had managed to change cell surfaces by soaking the tissue that needed to be transplanted in a common nutrient liquid, allowing the tissue to be grafted to the host without triggering any rejection mechanisms, a process which could be used for burns and scars. A JAMA editor noted that this success "means 'one of the most significant - even revolutionary - advances (in transplant research)' may be just beyond the horizon". This new technique aimed to avoid using anti-rejection drugs which can make patients more susceptible to infections. The hope, according to Summerlin, was to be able to avoid rejections from transplanted organs like hearts and kidneys. The problem, however, was that the transplanted tissue needed to sit in the solution for six weeks before the transplant; at that time, a heart or kidney could only survive outside of the body for a couple of days. Summerlin and his advisor, immunologist Robert A. Good, hoped that machines would be soon invented that allowed organs to last the six weeks needed for them to soak. According to Good, "the potential is fantastic".

Speaking at an American Cancer Society seminar in Nogales, Arizona in March 1973, Summerlin summarized that, currently, doctors have to replace skin on a burn victim "bit by bit" in order to avoid tissue rejection. With Summerlin's discovery, doctors could have "skin stored in sheets" grown from donor cells to be used quickly to repair burns.

== Investigation and repercussions ==
In 1970, while working as a clinical researcher at Stanford University, Summerlin announced that he had been able to transplant skin from one unrelated person to another, avoiding the normal issues of transplant rejection. Other researchers were unable to duplicate the results. In 1973, he transferred to the University of Minnesota, where he announced that he had transplanted the skin from a black man to a white man successfully. Again, scientists were unable to confirm that this had happened.

In 1974, Summerlin was working under Good at Memorial Sloan-Kettering Cancer Center in New York City, conducting research in transplantation immunology, when Good asked Summerlin to repeat the success Summerlin had had with human skin grafting in mice. Good later asked research fellow John Ninnemann to replicate Summerlin's experiments but Ninnemann was unsuccessful. Accusations from colleagues surfaced that Summerlin had not been successful with his transplants, but instead was faking the results by using a black pen to color the skin on the mouse. A research assistant looking at the mouse discovered that the darkened patch could be removed with alcohol.

A five-person committee, led by C. Chester Stock, commissioned a report which was released at the cancer center and stated that Summerlin had "admitted to the committee that he had darkened the skin of two white mice with a felt-tip pen to make it appear that the mice had accepted skin grafts from genetically different animals, and that on four occasions he had misrepresented the results of experimental transplants of human corneas into rabbit eyes." The committee concluded that Summerlin's actions represented “irresponsible conduct that is incompatible with discharge of his responsibilities in the scientific community.” A mouse from the research at the University of Minnesota was found to have successful skin grafts, but it was later discovered that it was very closely related to the mouse it had received the skin from, thus making the success not unusual

Memorial Sloan-Kettering President Lewis Thomas said that Summerlin was suffering from a "serious emotional disturbance" and that "he has not been fully responsible for the actions he has taken nor the representations he has made".

The committee's report also concluded that Summerlin's advisor, Good, was at fault for not fully vetting Summerlin before hiring him, being slow to take claims of sloppy research seriously, and being overly supportive of successful claims made by Summerlin without corroborating evidence. Good's response was, "that the affair had made him 'a ‐somewhat wiser and sadder person' who, in the future, would be more skeptical about the purported findings of the many scientists working under him".

According to Newsday science writer David Zinman, a desire for cancer research funding may have been to blame, as Congress doubled the budget from $233 million in 1971 to $589 million in 1974. This caused fierce competition for the money and an "early release of data on promising experiments in the hope of attracting recognition and more money". National Cancer Institute Doctor William Terry refuted this, saying that a desire for funding as no excuse for scientific hoaxes and that there has always been competition and egos involved.

== Aftermath ==
The Memorial Sloan-Kettering Cancer Center committee recommended that Summerlin be fired from his job, but voted to allow him a year of paid medical leave in order for him to receive medical care and rest first.

The New York Times called this scandal "a medical Watergate that reflected dangerous trends in current efforts to gain scientific acclaim and funds for research.” Good was accused of supporting Summerlin's unsubstantiated research accomplishments for the financial gain of the cancer center.

A 1987 Los Angeles Times article called the thirteen-year-old case one of the most "notable example(s) of fraudulent scientific research".

The phrase "painting the mice" has since become synonymous with research fraud.

== See also ==
- Betrayers of the Truth: Fraud and Deceit in the Halls of Science
- List of scientific misconduct incidents
- Elizabeth Holmes
