= Annarosa Leri =

American scientist

- Born: Reggio Emilia, Italy
- Education: University of Parma; Liceo Scientifico, Castelnovo ne' Monti
- Scientific career
- Fields: Dermatology; Molecular Biology; Anesthesiology
- Workplaces: University of Parma; New York Medical College; Harvard Medical School; Brigham & Women's Hospital

Annarosa Leri is a medical doctor and former associate professor at Harvard University. Along with former professor Piero Anversa, Leri was engaged in biomedical research at Brigham and Women’s Hospital in Boston, an affiliate of Harvard Medical School. Since at least 2003 Anversa and Leri had investigated the ability of the heart to regenerate damaged cells using cardiac stem cells.

A paper published in The Lancet in 2011 and another paper published in Circulation in 2012 were acknowledged by Anversa and Leri to have “fictitious data points” and “altered figures.” The 2012 paper was retracted, and the 2011 paper received an expression of concern.

In the spring of 2014 Harvard Medical School and Brigham and Women's Hospital launched an investigation into the conduct of the two researchers. In what was considered an unusual step the pair filed a lawsuit against the hospital and medical school on December 16, 2014, claiming the investigation had damaged their reputations and careers. Anversa and Leri later admitted to fabricating data and altering published figures, and their lawsuit against Harvard was dismissed.

Anversa and Leri also published a paper on human lung stem cells in The New England Journal of Medicine. There was a controversy and debate for its validity and reproducibility, and the paper was retracted after the investigation by Harvard Medical School and Brigham and Women’s Hospital has determined that some of the images in the article were manipulated.

In 2018, Anversa and Leri were approved to begin work on "stem-based therapies for cardiovascular disease" at Italy's Istituto Superiore di Sanità (ISS); as of 2020, Leri is not listed as a staff member at ISS. Also in 2018, Harvard University and Brigham and Women's Hospital called for an additional 31 papers by Anversa and Leri to be retracted after many failed attempts to replicate their work.

As of 2022 Leri has had 19 of her published papers retracted, another 17 papers have received an expression of concern, and another 12 papers have been corrected. Several of the retracted papers had been published in Circulation Research which, until he was dismissed for making homophobic comments was edited by Leri's collaborator Roberto Bolli, a "Distinguished University Scholar" and Professor of Medicine at the University of Louisville and an author of three retracted publications co-authored with Leri, including the initial report of SCIPIO clinical trial results.

== See also ==
- List of scientific misconduct incidents
