= Martin Stone (philosopher) =

Irish philosopher (born 1965)

Martin William Francis Stone (born 1965) is an Irish philosopher who served as a professor of philosophy at the Katholieke Universiteit Leuven. In 2010 he was found guilty of plagiarizing texts in more than 40 publications and subsequently dismissed from his university post.

== Biography ==
Stone received his bachelor's degree in classics and philosophy from King's College, University of London, and a Master's degree in philosophy from the University of Paris. He also studied at the University of Cambridge for a time, but earned no degree there. He earned his Master of Philosophy (MPhil) and PhD at Birkbeck, University of London. His doctoral thesis was titled "Casuistry and moral conflict: a philosophical and historical examination of the practical resolution of moral conflicts by casuistical reasoning" and was submitted in 1994. He has held post-doctoral fellowships at the Warburg Institute in London, as well as shorter appointments at the London School of Economics, Oxford University, and was hired to teach courses on the philosophy of religion at his alma mater, King's College.

He was a professor at the Katholieke Universiteit Leuven's Institute of Philosophy. While employed there, his research centred on the philosophy of the Late Middle Ages and the Renaissance.

=== Plagiarism ===
In 2010, first reports of plagiarism were made public by several scholars. Among them, Ilkka Kantola, a Member of Parliament in Finland, said that Stone had copied extensively from Kantola’s 1994 book Probability and Moral Uncertainty in Late Medieval and Early Modern Times: "tens of pages were identical or nearly identical, although my name was not mentioned at all", Kantola said in a 2010 interview. The investigators Dougherty, Harsting, and Friedman have documented 40 instances of plagiarism in an academic journal.

In January 2010, the Commission on Scientific Integrity at Katholieke Universiteit Leuven sent notifications to editors who had published Stone’s works, stating that "the conduct of Martin Stone is highly questionable in terms of scientific integrity" and that the university "formally retracts its affiliation" with the publications by Stone which appeared when he was a professor there.

Despite the discovery of plagiarism and the retraction of many of these works, a 2023 study found that they continued to be cited by other philosophers.

== See also ==
- List of scientific misconduct incidents
