= Falsificationism =

Falsificationism may refer to:

- Critical rationalism, an epistemological philosophy founded by Karl Popper
- Three models of scientific progress in "Falsification and the Methodology of Scientific Research Programmes" by Imre Lakatos
  - Dogmatic falsificationism
  - Naive falsificationism
  - Sophisticated falsificationism

== See also ==
- Falsifiability
- Falsification (disambiguation)
- Verificationism
