= Terry Elton =

American professor of pharmacology

Terry S. Elton is an American professor of pharmacology at the Ohio State University.

== Education and academic history ==
Terry Elton is a biochemist who received his B.S. from Weber State University in Chemistry, his Ph.D. in Biochemistry from Washington State University, and performed postdoctoral work at Washington State University and the University of Alabama. As of 2019 Elton is a pharmacy professor and researcher at the Dorothy M. Davis Heart and Lung Research Institute at Ohio State.

== Scientific misconduct ==
Elton was first accused of scientific misconduct in 2010 after certain images in his published works seemed to be doctored, and was subjected to an internal investigation by an Ohio State pharmacy department committee. Elton was originally cleared of allegations of misconduct after the university's investigatory committee concluded that the “irregular” images were a result of disorganization, not “intentional malfeasance.” However, in late December 2012, Elton was found guilty of scientific misconduct by both Ohio State University officials and the Office of Research Integrity. He was found to have falsified data in Western blots used to identify key proteins in his research into the brain chemistry of patients with Down syndrome. He also falsified Western blot data in a grant application to the National Institutes of Health. According to John Dahlberg, leader of the federal investigation into Elton's data, "It is clear from the PowerPoint that Dr. Elton has a long-standing convention of reusing figures to represent both control and experimental conditions. It would also appear that he has copied, resized/stretched/shrunk, darkened and flipped images (horizontally and vertically) ... to conceal similarities."

In 2012 the Office of Research Integrity recommended that six of Elton's published papers be retracted, and he voluntarily entered a three-year exclusion agreement in which he excluded himself from any contracts or subcontracts with any U.S. government agency and serving as an adviser in any form to the Public Health Services. Ohio State University also imposed its own penalties for Elton, including a prohibition from supervising any undergraduate or graduate students for three years, submitting all papers and grant applications to the university for review before proceeding with them for five years, and completing counseling on research misconduct and training on research ethics.

As of 2025, seven of Elton's research papers have been retracted.

== Retracted papers ==
Chromosome 21-derived MicroRNAs Provide an Etiological Basis for Aberrant Protein Expression in Human Down Syndrome Brains This article was published in the Journal of Biological Chemistry. In this paper, Elton and his lab were working with five microRNA genes. The ultimate results suggesting that the inactivation of the miRNA gene, Has-21, might provide a therapeutic tool in the treatment of down syndrome. The paper was first published on November 6, 2009. By the time the paper was retracted, it had already been cited 34 times. The paper was retracted due to falsified and/or fabricated “western blots” in figures 2C, 2D, 2F, 3C, 3E, 4G, 5C and 5F.

Human chromosome 21-derived miRNAs are overexpressed in down syndrome brains and hearts This article was published in Elsevier. In this paper, the hypothesis was that the down syndrome gene dosage overexpression of Has-21 miRNA causes a decreased expression of specific target proteins which in turn causes the neuronal and cardiac symptoms that patients with Down syndrome experience. The paper was first published on April 1, 2008. By the time the paper was retracted it had already been cited 74 times. The paper was retracted due to falsified and/or fabricated Western blots in figures 3B, 3C, 3F, 3H, 3I and 3J.

The Human Angiotensin II Type 1 Receptor 1166 A/C Polymorphism Attenuates MicroRNA-155 Binding This article was published in the Journal of Biological Chemistry. This study by Elton's lab provided the first feasible biochemical mechanism by which the +1166 A/C polymorphism can lead to increased AT1R densities and possibly cardiovascular disease. The paper was first published on June 21, 2007. By the time the paper was retracted it had already been cited 184 times. The paper was retracted due to falsified and/or fabricated Western blots in figure 6 of the publication.

Transcriptional regulation of the AT1 receptor gene in immortalized human trophoblast cells This article was published in the Biochimica et Biophysica Acta or BBA (Latin for Biochemical and Biophysical Journal). This article explains a discovery of an immortalized human trophoblast cell line responds to AngII a peptide that regulates contraction of smooth vascular muscle, fluid homeostasis, and sympathetic nervous activity. The research also suggests that it can be synthesized in the placenta (gives nutrients and water to the fetus) which increases a gene that allows for less trophoblast invasiveness which is the main cause for Preeclampsia. The paper was retracted due to the fabricated blots in Figure 6. It has been cited six times.

TGF-β1 regulation of human AT1 receptor mRNA splice variants harboring exon 2 This article was published in Molecular and Cellular Endocrinology. This article discusses how the inclusion of exon 2 in hAT1R mRNA transcripts dramatically decreases hAT1R protein levels and the responsiveness of Ang II. AT1R activation is closely associated with cardiovascular disease, the inclusion of exon 2 by alternative splicing represents a novel mechanism to reduce the overall production of the hAT1R protein and possibly limit the potential pathological effects of AT1R activation. This paper was retracted due to fabricated blots in Figures 5, 6B,7B,9B. This paper was cited 11 times.

== See also ==
- List of scientific misconduct incidents
