= Luk Van Parijs =

American biologist

Luk Van Parijs is a former associate professor of biology at the Massachusetts Institute of Technology (MIT) Center for Cancer Research. After investigating for a year, MIT fired Van Parijs for research misconduct. Van Parijs admitted to fabricating and falsifying research data in a paper, several unpublished manuscripts, and grant applications. In March 2011, Van Parijs pleaded guilty in a U.S. District Court in Boston to one count of making a false statement on a federal grant application. The government asked Judge Denise Casper for a 6-month jail term because of the seriousness of the fraud, which involved a $2-million grant. After several prominent scientists including Van Parijs' former post-doc supervisor pleading for clemency on his behalf, on 13 June, Van Parijs was finally sentenced six months of home detention with electronic monitoring, plus 400 hours of community service and a payment to MIT of $61,117 - restitution for the already-spent grant money that MIT had to return to the National Institutes of Health.

Van Parijs' area of research was in the use of short-interference RNA in studying disease mechanisms, especially in autoimmune diseases. He was studying normal immune cell function and defects in these cells during disease development.

== Timeline ==
- About 1970: Born in Belgium.
- Before 1997: Receives undergraduate education at Cambridge University in England.
- About 1993 - 1997: Works in the laboratory of Harvard professor Dr. Abul Abbas at Brigham and Women's Hospital (BWH).
- 1997: Earns doctorate in immunology from Harvard.
- 1998 - 2000: Postdoctoral student in the laboratory of Dr. David Baltimore at MIT and California Institute of Technology.
- 2000: Joins the biology department at MIT.
- 2001: Named the Ivan R. Cottrell Career Development Assistant Professor of Immunology at MIT for a three-year term.
- July 2004: Promoted to the rank of associate professor at MIT, without tenure.
- August 2004: MIT begins a confidential investigation when a group of researchers in van Parijs' laboratory alleges research misconduct.
- September 2004: Placed on paid administrative leave and denied access to laboratory by MIT.
- 6 October 2005: Caltech begins inquiry (requested by Baltimore, "when New Scientist pointed out" problems in Caltech papers). (Date & quote: news media #8 and #18, below, respectively.)
- 27 October 2005: MIT fires van Parijs.
- 28 October 2005: News media coverage begins; Harvard/BWH and Caltech work questioned by New Scientist; Abbas determining "course of action" in light of New Scientist enquiries.
- 26 January 2006: Data in 2 Caltech patent applications having inventors van Parijs & others questioned in press (News media #16, below).
- March 2007: Caltech investigation concludes: van Parijs committed research misconduct; four(4) published papers require correction.
- 23 January 2009: Office of Research Integrity's findings of scientific misconduct at Harvard/BWH, Caltech, & MIT as well as van Parijs' Voluntary Exclusion Agreement published in the Federal Register: "Findings of Scientific Misconduct". Federal Register. Vol. 74, no. 14. January 23, 2009. pp. 4201–4202.

== Literature corrections ==
(Original paper, correction; Chronological by literature correction - w/in institution of origin.)

=== Harvard papers ===
- van Parijs L, Perez VL, Biuckians A, Maki RG, London CA, and Abbas AK (1997) Role of interleukin 12 and costimulators in T cell anergy in vivo. Journal of Experimental Medicine 186(7): 1119-28 (6 October). PMID 9314560 (Retracted, see doi:10.1084/jem.186.7.11194309r, PMID 19364884); Open access.
  - Retraction: "Role of interleukin 12..." by van Parijs, L et al. Journal of Experimental Medicine published online 13 April 2009. Retraction by journal editors. Open access.
- van Parijs L, Peterson DA, and Abbas AK (1998) The Fas/Fas Ligand Pathway and Bcl-2 Regulate T Cell Responses to Model Self and Foreign Antigens. Immunity 8(2): 265-274 (1 February). PMID 9492007 (Retracted, see doi:10.1016/j.immuni.2009.04.001, PMID 19378493)
  - van Parijs L, Peterson DA, and Abbas AK (2009) Retraction: The Fas/Fas Ligand Pathway and Bcl-2 Regulate T Cell Responses to Model Self and Foreign Antigens. Immunity 30(4): 611 (17 April).

=== Caltech papers ===
- van Parijs L, Refaell Y, Lord JD, Nelson BH, Abbas AK, and Baltimore D (1999) Uncoupling IL-2 Signals that Regulate T Cell Proliferation, Survival, and Fas-Mediated Activation-Induced Cell Death. Immunity 11(3): 281-288 (1 September). PMID 10514006 (Retracted, see doi:10.1016/j.immuni.2009.04.002, PMID 19382300)
  - van Parijs L, Refaell Y, Lord JD, Nelson BH, Abbas AK, and Baltimore D (2009) Retraction: Uncoupling IL-2 Signals that Regulate T Cell Proliferation, Survival, and Fas-Mediated Activation-Induced Cell Death. Immunity 30(4): 611 (17 April).
- van Parijs L, Refaell Y, Abbas AK, and Baltimore D (1999) Autoimmunity as a Consequence of Retrovirus-Mediated Expression of C-FLIP in Lymphocytes. Immunity 11(6): 763-770 (1 December). PMID 10626898 (Retracted, see doi:10.1016/j.immuni.2009.04.003, PMID 19378495)
  - van Parijs L, Refaell Y, Abbas AK, and Baltimore D (2009) Retraction: Autoimmunity as a Consequence of Retrovirus-Mediated Expression of C-FLIP in Lymphocytes. Immunity 30(4): 612 (17 April).

=== MIT papers ===
(Each correction retracts data.)

- Nencioni A, Sandy P, Dillon C, Kissler S, Blume-Jensen P, and van Parijs L (2004) RNA interference for the identification of disease-associated genes. Current Opinion in Molecular Therapeutics 6(2): 136-40 (April). PMID 15195924
  - (2005) Erratum: [Nencioni A, Sandy P, Dillon C, Kissler S, Blume-Jensen P, and van Parijs L (2004) RNA interference for the identification of disease-associated genes. Current Opinion in Molecular Therapeutics 6(2): 136–40, Current Opinion in Molecular Therapeutics 7(3): 282 (June). Pdf available here.
- Rubinson DA, Dillon CP, Kwiatkowski AV, Sievers C, Yang L, Kopinja J, Zhang M, McManus MT, Gertler FB, Scott ML, and van Parijs L (2003) A lentivirus-based system to functionally silence genes in primary mammalian cells, stem cells and transgenic mice by RNA interference. Nature Genetics 33(3): 401-6 (March). PMID 12590264; Figures & tables open access. Authors list subsequently changed twice by "corrigenda": June 2003 (34(2): 231) (Open access) & June 2007 (following ref.).
  - Rubinson DA, Dillon CP, Kwiatkowski AV, Sievers C, Yang L, Kopinja J, Zhang M, McManus MT, Gertler FB, Scott ML, and van Parijs L (2007) Corrigendum: A lentivirus-based system... Nature Genetics 39(6): 803 (June). Open access; Data in original paper actually removed from site.
- Kelly E, Won A, Refaeli Y, and van Parijs L (2002) IL-2 and related cytokines can promote T cell survival by activating AKT. Journal of Immunology 168(2): 597-603 (15 January). PMID 11777951; Open access.
  - Kelly E, Won A, Refaeli Y, and van Parijs L (2007) Erratum: IL-2 and related cytokines... Journal of Immunology 179(12): 8569 (15 December). "Retraction" of Figure 5B. Open access.
- Layer K, Lin G, Nencioni A, Hu W, Schmucker A, Antov AN, Li X, Takamatsu S, Chevassut T, Dower NA, Stang SL, Beier D, Buhlmann J, Bronson RT, Elkon KB, Stone JC, Van Parijs L, and Lim B (2003) Autoimmunity as the consequence of a spontaneous mutation in Rasgrp1. Immunity 19(2): 243-55 (August). PMID 12932358 (Retracted, see doi:10.1016/j.immuni.2012.05.007, PMID 22808526, Retraction Watch); Open access.
  - Fig. 6A falsified according to ORI findings of misconduct published 23 Jan 2009.

== News media ==
(Chronological)

1. Robert L. Hotz, "Caltech President Who Raised School's Profile to Step Down" (Los Angeles Times, 4 Oct. 2005, P. A1)
2. MIT News Office, "MIT professor dismissed for research misconduct" (press release) 27 Oct. 2005; published in News Office's TechTalk 2 Nov. 2005 (50(7): 3, 6)
3. Boston Globe, "MIT professor is fired over fabricated data," 28 Oct. 2005
4. Samuel Reich, Eugenie (2005) MIT professor sacked for fabricating data. NewScientist.com (28 Oct.)
5. New York Times, "M.I.T. Dismisses a Researcher, Saying He Fabricated Some Data," 28 Oct. 2005
6. The Tech (MIT student paper), "MIT Fires Professor Van Parijs for Using Fake Data in Papers," 28 Oct. 2005
7. Boston Globe, "More doubts raised on fired MIT professor," 29 Oct. 2005
8. Harvard Crimson, "MIT Professor Fired for Faking Data," 31 Oct. 2005
9. The Tech, "Van Parijs' Research at Caltech, Brigham Drawing New Scrutiny," 1 Nov. 2005
10. TheScientist.com, "Immunologists prepare for fraud fallout," 3 Nov. 2005
11. Dalton, R. (2005) Universities scramble to assess scope of falsified results. Nature 438(7064): 7 (3 Nov.) PMID 16267515
12. Couzin, J. (2005) MIT terminates researcher over data fabrication. Science 310(5749): 758 (4 Nov.) PMID 16272088
13. New Scientist, "One bad apple..." (unsigned editorial), 5 Nov. 2005
14. Chronicle of Higher Education, "MIT Fires Biology Professor Who Admitted Faking Data," 11 Nov. 2005 (Payment or subscription required.)
15. unsigned editorial (2006) Scientific blues. Nature Immunology 7(1): 1 (1 Jan.) PMID 16357846
16. Reich, E.S. (2006) Bad data fail to halt patents. Nature 439(7075): 379 (26 Jan.) PMID 16437075
17. Odling-Smee, L., Giles, J., Fuyuno, I., Cyranoski, D., & Marris, E. (2007) Misconduct Special: Where are they now? Nature 445(7125): 244-5 (18 Jan.) PMID 17230161
18. Reich, E.S. (2007) Scientific misconduct report still under wraps. New Scientist ?(2631): 16 (24 Nov.)
19. Reich, E.S. (2009) Former MIT biologist penalized for falsifying data. Nature.com (3 Feb.) Nature News or here
20. Reich, E.S. (2009) Beating the science cheats. New Scientist ?(2706): 22 (2 May)

== See also ==
- List of scientific misconduct incidents
