= Lorenza Colzato =

Italian cognitive psychologist

Lorenza S. Colzato (born 20 September 1974) is an Italian cognitive psychologist who is best known for the attention she received in the mainstream media in the Netherlands for multiple incidents of scientific misconduct. Her research "aims to understand the neural and neuromodular underpinnings of cognitive control in humans."

== Life ==
Colzato was born in Bolzano, Italy. She studied at the University of Padova (Italy), where she received a Master's degree in Clinical Psychology and Cognitive Psychology in 1999. She then moved to Leiden University (Netherlands) where she obtained her PhD degree in Social and Behavioural Sciences in 2005. In 2006, she was appointed as assistant professor at the Cognitive Psychology Unit of Leiden University. Subsequently, in 2017, she left Leiden due to allegations of scientific and criminal misconduct. In 2017, she became a Professor by Special Appointment (Außerplanmäßiger Professor) at the Ruhr University Bochum (North Rhine-Westphalia, Germany), a position that was officially revoked from her by the university in May 2021 due to the scientific misconduct. Since 2019, she furthermore works as researcher at the Carl Gustav Carus University Hospital, affiliated with the Technical University Dresden (Saxony, Germany). She is also a psychotherapist.

In 2008, she was awarded a VENI scholarship from the Dutch Research Council (NWO).

== Research ==
Colzato's research is focused on how thinking and creativity are shaped. Her research often touches on popular topics and the resulting papers are discussed in popular media: examples include studies on exercise and creativity, the effect of odors on trust, and the effect of meditation on creative thinking.

== Scientific misconduct ==
Since 2019, Colzato's work at Leiden University was being investigated by the Medical Ethical board for various alleged breaches of academic integrity, including data manipulation, misattribution of authorship, and collection of blood samples without permission. The latter would turn out to be a criminal offense. Colzato resigned from her position at Leiden University, and requested a second opinion from the university's academic integrity committee. She pointed out that one of the accusers, a PhD candidate at that time, was the person who actually performed the study (which the medical ethics review board declined to approve), took the blood samples and was the lead and corresponding (hence, responsible) author of one of the two articles in question. She further argued that Leiden University violated various rules and regulations throughout the investigation. However, both the University Scientific Integrity Committee (CWI) and the Netherlands Board on Research Integrity (LOWI) concluded that, whatever the wrong-doings of her accuser may have been, such would not be sufficient to exculpate Colzato (being the supervisor or principal investigator) for the confirmed integrity violations, including performing an unapproved medical study. On 21 September 2020, the Dutch newspaper NRC Handelsblad reported that Leiden University had, in August, made Colzato's provisional dismissal a definitive one.

In 2019, Leiden University recommended the retraction of two of her papers, of which the first was retracted in 2021 and the second received an expression of concern in 2020 from their respective journals. As a result of further investigations, Leiden University concluded in 2021 that Colzato also committed fraud in at least fifteen other scientific publications. In a supplementary decision on 17 May 2022, the executive board of Leiden University published the titles of seven articles in which there is evidence of malpractice.

== See also ==
- Leiden Institute for Brain and Cognition
