= Dipak K. Das =

Medical researcher

Dipak Kumar Das (1947 – September 19, 2013) was the director of the Cardiovascular Research Center at the University of Connecticut Health Center in Farmington and is known for research fraud. His work centered on the beneficial properties of resveratrol, which is found in red wine, but over twenty of his research papers have been since retracted.

On January 11, 2012, the University of Connecticut Health Center announced that a review board has found Das guilty of 145 counts of fabrication or falsification of data; the three-year investigation examined more than seven years of activity in Das's lab, and centered on Western blot results that had been manipulated and used in published papers. In May 2012, Das was fired from both positions at the University of Connecticut Health Center.

== Biography ==
Das graduated from Jadavpur University and received his Ph.D. from Calcutta University in India. He joined the University of Connecticut in 1984 and received tenure in 1993.

Das was a prolific publisher of research. His name appears on over 500 articles, including 117 articles on resveratrol. Das was an editor-in-chief of the journal Antioxidants and Redox Signaling. He also served as associate editor of the American Journal of Physiology. Heart and Circulatory Physiology and consulting editor of Molecular and Cellular Biochemistry. His work on alcohol, HDL, and the heart was mentioned in The New York Times. He also gained attention in 2009 after publishing a study on the heart benefits of crushed garlic.

== Data falsification investigation ==
Data fabrication by Das was alleged by a university investigation committee to have begun in 2005, when "there was no one in the lab with the expertise to prepare Western blots." Regarding Das' falsification of figures in his published works, in explicitly identifying 145 such cases the investigation committee reported that "many figures had more manipulations but, for expediency, the review board only noted the most obvious." The investigation report further stated that "given the large number of irregularities discovered, which were done over several years and in several different ways, the review board can only conclude that they were the result of intentional acts of data falsification and fabrication, designed to deceive." The university notified 11 scientific journals that published papers authored by Das, and the U.S. Office of Research Integrity launched an independent investigation of his work.

In January 2012, University of Connecticut officials reported that dismissal proceedings were underway against Das. The Health Center terminated all research in Das's laboratory and declined federal research grants awarded to him. Following Das' dismissal, the Hartford Courant in 2013 reported that Das intended to file a $35 million defamation lawsuit against UConn.

As of 2024, Das has had 24 of his research publications retracted.

== See also ==
- List of scientific misconduct incidents
