= Dănuț Marcu =

Romanian mathematician and computer scientist

Dănuț Marcu (born 11 January 1952) is a Romanian mathematician and computer scientist. He claimed to have authored more than 400 scientific papers.

He graduated with degrees in Mathematics and Computer Science from the University of Bucharest and received his Ph.D. from the same university in 1981. His doctoral thesis, Algebraic and Combinatorial Methods for the Study of the Connectivity of Finite Networks, was written under the direction of Sergiu Rudeanu.

Marcu was frequently accused of plagiarism. The editors of Studia Universitatis Babeș-Bolyai, Informatica decided to ban Marcu from their journal for this reason, as did the editors of 4OR and the editors of Geombinatorics. The editors of Geometriae Dedicata state that they suspect Marcu of plagiarism, as he submitted a manuscript which is "more-or-less word for word the same" as a paper by Bernt Lindström. Jerrold W. Grossman, Sanpei Kageyama, Martin R. Pettet, and anonymous reviewers have accused Marcu of plagiarism in MathSciNet reviews. According to the managing editors of Menemui Matematik, Marcu's paper in that journal is a well known result in graph theory, and the paper "should not have been published".

== See also ==
- List of scientific misconduct incidents
