= Steven A. Leadon =

American academic

Steven A. (Tony) Leadon is a former professor of radiation oncology at the University of North Carolina.

In 2003, a university found that Leadon had fabricated and falsified data in his research on DNA repair. In 2006, the United States Office of Research Integrity came to the same conclusion, saying that "Leadon engaged in scientific misconduct by falsifying DNA samples and constructing falsified figures for experiments done in his laboratory to support claimed findings of defects in a DNA repair process that involved rapid repair of DNA damage in the transcribed strand of active genes, included in four grant applications and in eight publications and one published manuscript".

In the wake of the investigations, papers have been retracted from several journals including Science and Mutation Research, while more articles were partially retracted from journals including Proceedings of the National Academy of Sciences and Molecular and Cellular Biology.

== See also ==
- List of scientific misconduct incidents
