= CGK733 fraud =

2006 South Korean scientific misconduct

CGK733 was a synthetic chemical substance which was reported in 2006 to have remarkable properties in reversing cell senescence (aging). However, the entire work behind the discovery of this compound has since been found to be falsified and the authors of the original reports have retracted all their claims.

CGK733 was claimed to be an inhibitor of ATM/ATR kinases, which are involved in DNA damage repair. CGK was claimed to extend the lifetime of cultured cells by approximately 20 divisions, or roughly 25%, specifically in mammalian cells.

The original report garnered scientific attention, but was retracted in 2008. The retraction states that the screen to identify CGK733 as an anti-senescence agent was not carried out; experiments exploring the cellular effects of CGK733 were misrepresented; the identification of ATM as the target of CGK733 was fabricated; a compound which was essential for ATM target validation had not been synthesized; and the chemical structure of CGK733 was misrepresented.

The principal investigator, Tae Kook Kim, and several associates were consequently suspended from their positions at the Korea Advanced Institute of Science & Technology.
