= Betrayers of the Truth =

1982 book by William Broad

Betrayers of the Truth: Fraud and Deceit in the Halls of Science
- Cover of the first edition
- Authors: William Broad; Nicholas Wade
- Language: English
- Subject: Scientific misconduct
- Publisher: Simon & Schuster
- Publication date: 1982
- Publication place: United States
- Media type: Print (Hardcover and Paperback)
- Pages: 256
- ISBN: 0-671-44769-6
- OCLC: 8667573
- Dewey Decimal: 507/.24 19
- LC Class: Q172.5.F7 B76 1983

Betrayers of the Truth: Fraud and Deceit in the Halls of Science is a book by William Broad and Nicholas Wade, published in 1982 by Simon & Schuster in New York, and subsequently (1983) also by Century Publishing in London, and with a simplified subtitle as Betrayers of the Truth: Fraud and Deceit in Science by Oxford University Press in 1985. The book is a critique of some widely held beliefs about the nature of science and the scientific process.

Broad and Wade argue that the conventional wisdom that science is a strictly logical process, with objectivity the essence of scientist's attitudes, errors being speedily corrected by rigorous peer scrutiny and experiment replication, is a mythical ideal.

Our conclusion, in brief, is that science bears little resemblance to its conventional portrait. We believe that the logical structure discernible in scientific knowledge says nothing about the process by which the structure was built or the mentality of the builders. In the acquisition of knowledge, scientists are not guided by logic and objectivity alone, but also by such nonrational factors as rhetoric, propaganda, and personal prejudice. Scientists do not depend solely on rational thought, and have no monopoly on it.

The authors present a series of case studies associated with the conduct of scientific research, from the manipulation of results to the total fabrication of whole experiments.

== See also ==
- List of books about the politics of science
- Least publishable unit - Discussed in chapter 3, 'Rise of the Careerists'.
- Piltdown Man
- William Summerlin
