= Falsification =

Falsification may refer to:

- The act of disproving a proposition, hypothesis, or theory: see Falsifiability
- Mathematical proof
- Falsified evidence
- Falsification of history, distortion of the historical record also known as Historical negationism
- Forgery, the act of producing something that lacks authenticity with the intent to commit fraud or deception
- Self-falsification, e.g., the Liar's paradox

== See also ==
- Falsificationism (disambiguation)
