= Yakov Kuzyakov =

Soil scientist and ecologist

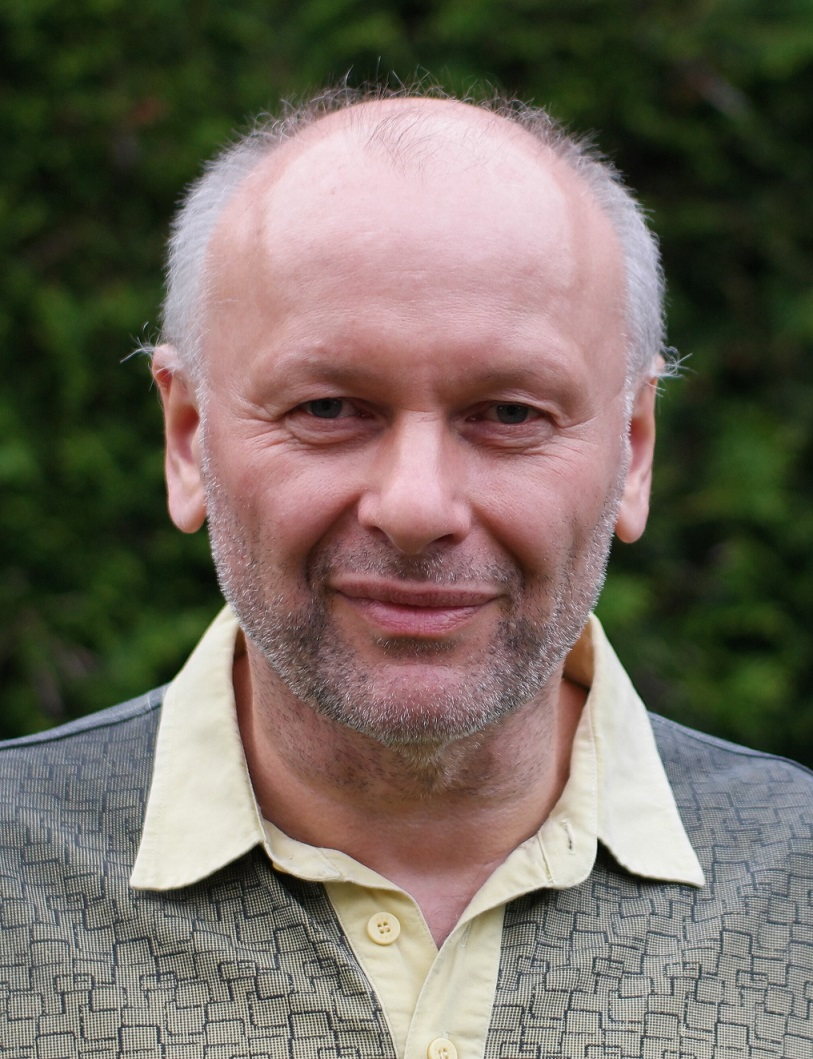
- Scientific career
- Fields: Soil science, Ecology, Land use, Carbon, Nitrogen, Rhizosphere, Climate change

Yakov Kuzyakov is a soil scientist who works at the University of Göttingen at the Soil Science of Temperate Ecosystems department. He is also affiliated with the RUDN University. Since September 2026 his work has been scrutinized, so far five of his papers have been retracted due to serious ethical violations during the peer review and editorial process.

== Research and career ==
He was a professor at the department of Agroecosystem Research at the University of Bayreuth until 2011. Since 2011, he has headed the department of Soil Science of Temperate Ecosystems and the department of Agricultural Soil Science at the University of Göttingen.

== Controversies ==
In 2026, his work came under scrutiny for unethical behavior. As an editor for the Elsevier European Journal of Soil Biology, he edited several of his own papers. As of September 2026, four of the papers in that journal that he authored and edited himself were retracted. Aside from editing four of his own papers, three papers had also been reviewed by at least one reviewer closely linked to him, compromising the editorial process. A fifth paper he authored in a second Elsevier journal, Science of the Total Environment, was retracted due to suspicious changes in authors on the paper during the review process.

== Scientific achievements ==
Yakov is one of the most cited scientists in the world and has published more than a thousand scientific papers throughout his career. He has been a world's top 2% ranked scientists for 7 years straight since 2020. He was a highly cited researcher in the field of Agricultural Sciences between 2015 and 2020, and was included in the list of the most cited Russian scientists in 2017. Four of his papers published in Soil Biology and Biochemistry have been listed as the most cited over the last 50 years.

== Research interests ==
Kuzyakov specialises in soil ecology and soil biogeochemistry (lipids, low molecular organic substances), agriculture, land use, agroecology, C and N cycles, priming effects, soil-plant interactions (rhizosphere processes), in-depth study of rhizodeposition, partitioning of CO_{2} fluxes from soil and application of radioactive and stable isotope labelling approaches in soil science.
