= Don Poldermans =

Dutch medical researcher who falsified data

Don Poldermans is a Dutch former cardiovascular medicine researcher who was fired for scientific misconduct and ethics concerns over informed consent. He was employed by Erasmus Medical Center in Rotterdam, Netherlands, where he was the head of the perioperative cardiac care unit. In addition, he was a member of the European Society of Cardiology Committee for Practice Guidelines and he acted as the Chairperson of the Task Force for the European Society of Cardiology.

== Scientific misconduct: the 2011/2012 investigation ==
Don Poldermans was conducting research for Erasmus when accusations regarding the integrity of Poldermans' work were brought forward. In order to investigate this case, Erasmus appointed a Committee for the Investigation of Scientific Integrity. The Committee found Poldermans to have committed misconduct on several counts. The primary studies that have been brought into question are four of the Dutch Echocardiographic Cardiac Risk Evaluation Applying Stress Echocardiography (DECREASE) studies, specifically DECREASE VI, IV, III, and II. DECREASE I was too far in the past to be investigated.

First, some of the randomized controlled trials did not obtain written informed consent from the participants before randomly allocating them to different strategies. These actions were a serious breach of medical research conduct.

Second, the committee determined that the data were not collected according to the protocol described beforehand and reported in the publications. For example, events such as myocardial infarction were not diagnosed by a panel of independent researchers, but by a single person who made no documentation for the reason for the categorisations, which were later found to be contradictory to the patients' own medical records.

Third, the committee determined that, in several cases, these trials had fabricated data.

Last, the committee found that untrustworthy data had been knowingly submitted for publication, another breach of proper scientific conduct.

As reported in Vox in 2024, cardiologists Graham Cole and Darrel Francis estimated that Polderman's actions led to approximately eight hundred thousand premature deaths.

== After the 2011/2012 investigation ==
A project running at the time of the investigation, DECREASE VI, was abandoned, because patients had not given consent to take part. The manner in which previous data was collected, reported, and occasionally fabricated indicates academic misconduct, bringing the legitimacy of the current data into question.

The enquiry decided that DECREASE II need not be retracted because it believed that Dobutamine Stress Echo, the subject of the study, was no longer used in hospitals. This belief appears to be incorrect. DECREASE VI led to two publications, which were also not retracted. No other researchers were disciplined in this inquiry. The Committee informed all parties involved in the funding of the project.

Poldermans was dismissed from his position at Erasmus Medical Center. Two professors will supervise the research done by Poldermans' students and will establish whether or not the projects in question can be completed successfully. If this is not possible, then the professors will find new research projects for the students affected. Don Poldermans acknowledged the committee's decision but he claimed that his misconduct was unintended.

Without Poldermans' trials, the remaining credible trials suggest that the recommendation for initiation of a perioperative course of beta blocker seems to increase mortality by 27%.

== The 2014 investigation report ==
Erasmus university issued a third investigation report in 2014. This covered DECREASE I which had not been covered in the previous investigations. It stated that the individual patients enrolled in DECREASE I could not be identified for cross-checking against the medical records. It therefore could not conclude on the accuracy or otherwise of the DECREASE I publications. An independent analysis by British researchers listed inconsistencies in the published DECREASE I reports that put their accuracy into doubt.
