= Research Center Borstel =

German research institute and hospital

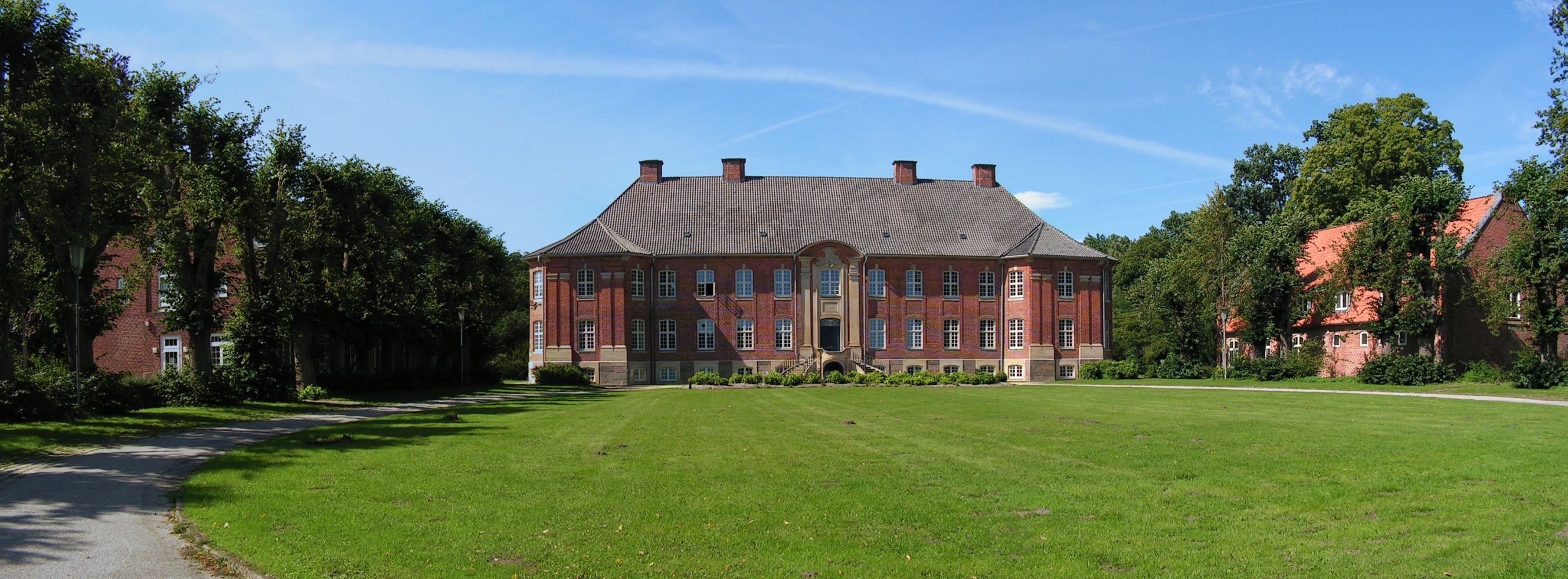
Borstel manor house, the main building of the Research Center Borstel

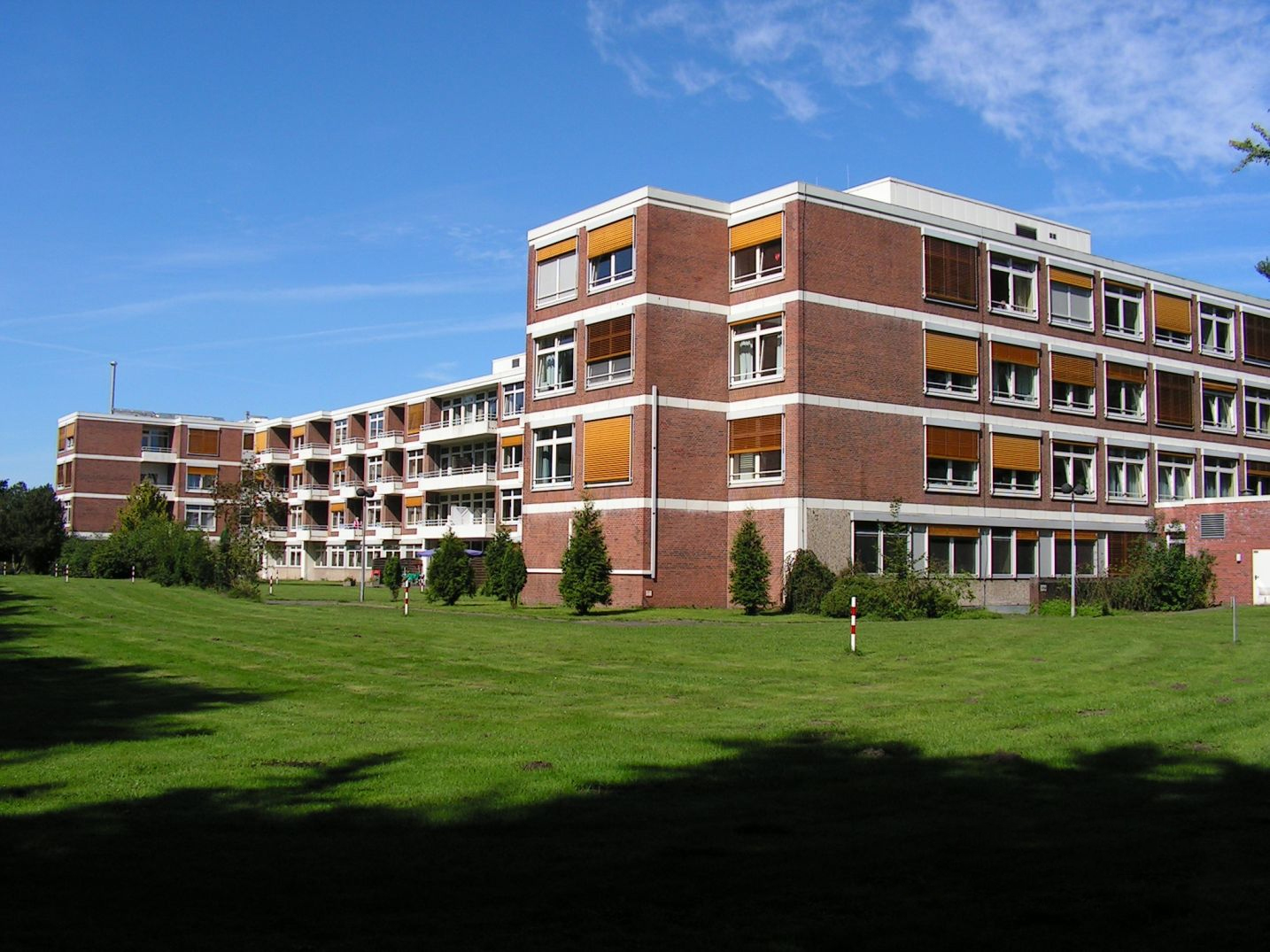
One of the buildings of the Research Center Borstel

The Research Center Borstel – Leibniz Lung Center (German: Forschungszentrum Borstel – Leibniz Lungenzentrum, FZB) is a German interdisciplinary biomedical research institution located in Borstel in Schleswig-Holstein, just north of Hamburg. It is affiliated with the Leibniz Association.

It was founded in 1947 as a research institute with the main focus on tuberculosis and leprosy. From its establishment until 1965 the institute was named the Tuberculosis Research Institute Borstel (German: Tuberkulose-Forschungsinstitut Borstel). A non-profit foundation, it receives a significant part of its funding from the Federal Ministry of Health and the Schleswig-Holstein state government. It has around 520 employees, and is the largest employer in Borstel.

The current director of the center is Stefan Ehlers.
