= Scientific misconduct =

Violation of codes of scholarly conduct and ethical behavior in scientific research

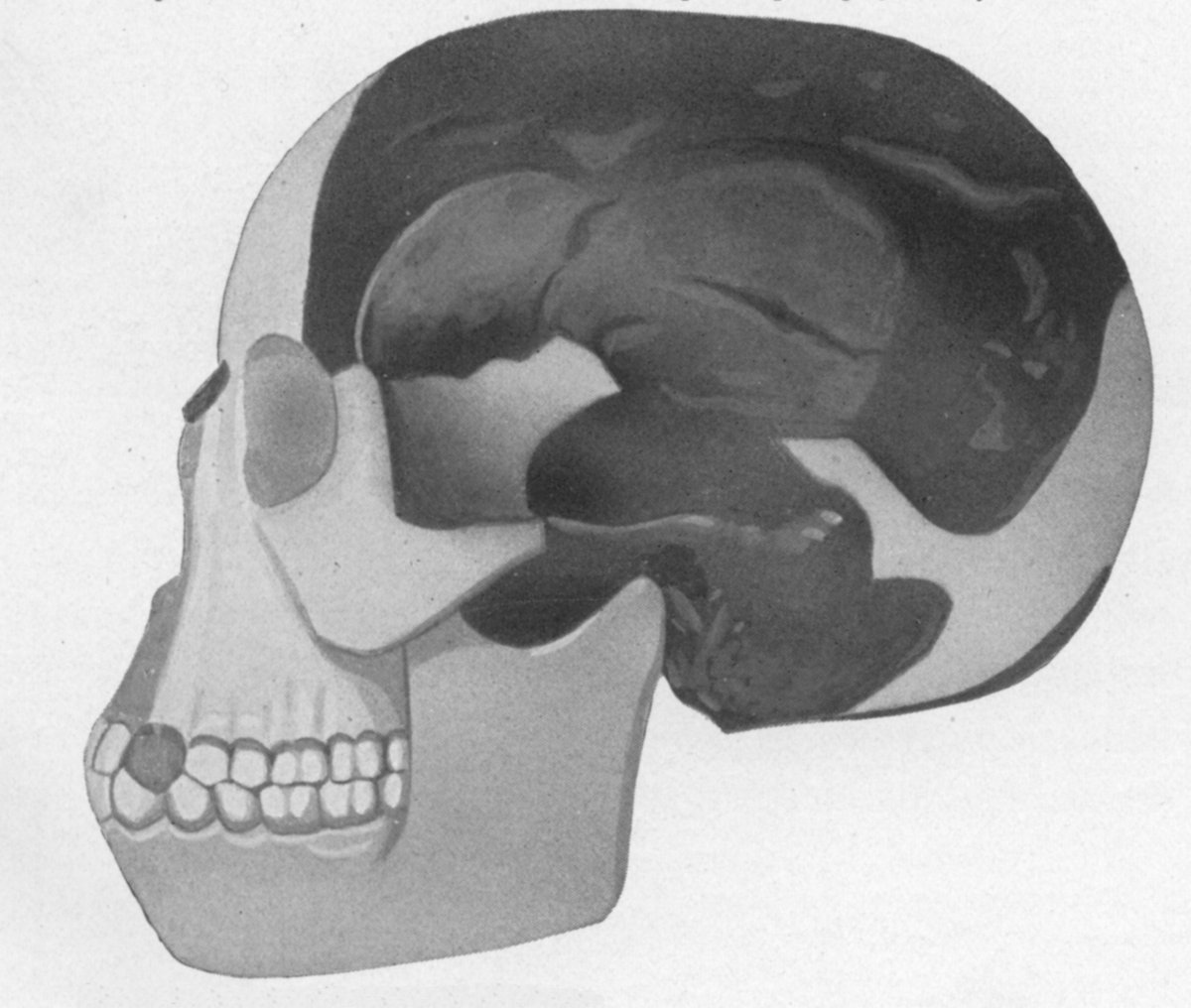
A reconstruction of the skull purportedly belonging to the Piltdown Man, a long-lasting case of scientific misconduct

Scientific misconduct is the violation of ethical and professional standards in research, including fabrication, falsification, plagiarism, and other practices that compromise the integrity of the design, conduct, analysis, reporting, or publication of scientific or research findings.

== Basic definitions and urgency of dealing with misconduct ==
Various research ethics bodies provide definitions of scientific misconduct. For example, the U.S. Office of Research Integrity (ORI) defines research misconduct to include (any of) fabrication, falsification, and plagiarism.

A Lancet review on Handling of Scientific Misconduct in Scandinavian countries provides the following sample definitions, reproduced in The COPE report 1999:

- Danish definition: "Intention or gross negligence leading to fabrication of the scientific message or a false credit or emphasis given to a scientist"
- Swedish definition: "Intention[al] distortion of the research process by fabrication of data, text, hypothesis, or methods from another researcher's manuscript form or publication; or distortion of the research process in other ways."

Scientific misconduct can harm the credibility of the research record, damage careers, and undermine public trust in science. It may also affect other researchers who rely on falsified or fabricated findings. Additionally, it can harm individuals who expose it. In addition there are public health implications attached to the promotion of medical or other interventions based on false or fabricated research findings. Scientific misconduct can result in loss of public trust in the integrity of science.

Three percent of the 3,475 research institutions that report to the US Department of Health and Human Services' Office of Research Integrity (ORI) indicate some form of scientific misconduct. However the ORI will only investigate allegations of impropriety where research was funded by federal grants. They routinely monitor such research publications for red flags and their investigation is subject to a statute of limitations. Other private organizations like the Committee of Medical Journal Editors (COJE) can only police their own members.

A 2025 study from Northwestern University found that "the publication of fraudulent science is outpacing the growth rate of legitimate scientific publications". The study also discovered broad networks of organized scientific fraudsters.

== Forms ==
The U.S. National Science Foundation defines three types of research misconduct: fabrication, falsification, and plagiarism.

- Fabrication is making up results and recording or reporting them. This is sometimes referred to as "drylabbing". A more minor form of fabrication is where references are included to give arguments the appearance of widespread acceptance, but are actually fake, or do not support the argument. A 2026 Lancet study examined 2.47 million biomedical papers and identified 4,046 references classified as fabricated. The study reported an increase in such references between 2023 and early 2026 and discussed measures for improving reference verification.
- Falsification is manipulating research materials, equipment, or processes or changing or omitting data or results such that the research is not accurately represented in the research record.
- Plagiarism is the appropriation of another person's ideas, processes, results, or words without giving appropriate credit. One form is the appropriation of the ideas and results of others, and publishing as to make it appear the author had performed all the work under which the data was obtained. There are recognized subsets of plagiarism:
  - Citation plagiarism involves failure to credit relevant prior work and can, in some cases, be considered research misconduct when done intentionally to misrepresent priority or originality. This is also known as, "citation amnesia", the "disregard syndrome" and "bibliographic negligence". Arguably, this is the most common type of scientific misconduct. Sometimes it is difficult to guess whether authors intentionally ignored a highly relevant cite or lacked knowledge of the prior work. Discovery credit can also be inadvertently reassigned from the original discoverer to a better-known researcher. This is a special case of the Matthew effect.
  - Plagiarism-fabrication is the act of mislabeling an unrelated figure from an unrelated publication and reproducing it exactly in a new publication, claiming that it represents new data.
  - Self-plagiarism or multiple publication of the same content with different titles or in different journals is sometimes also considered misconduct; scientific journals explicitly ask authors not to do this. This practice, often called ‘salami publication,’ refers to dividing one study into multiple smaller publications and is generally discouraged by journals and research integrity guidelines. According to some editors, this includes publishing the same article in a different language if the same research as multiple publications is counted as separate research.

Other types of research misconduct by authors are also recognized:

- Unmerited authorship is the practice of giving authorship credit to someone improperly. Ghostwriting describes when someone other than the named author(s) makes a major contribution to the research. Sometimes, this is done to mask contributions from authors with a conflict of interest. In other cases, a ghost authorship occurs where the ghost author sells the research paper to a colleague who wants the publication in order to boost their publishing metrics. Guest authorship is the phenomenon wherein authorship is given to someone who has not made any substantial contribution. This can be done by senior researchers who muscle their way onto the papers of inexperienced junior researchers as well as others that stack authorship in an effort to guarantee publication. This is much harder to prove due to a lack of consistency in defining "authorship" or "substantial contribution".
- Certain forms of citation bias, such as deliberately omitting scientific dissent, are discussed in the research integrity literature as practices that may undermine the scientific record. Academic bias can reduce academic freedom and hinder finding scientific truth.

Misconduct during scholarly peer review process:

- A reviewer or editor with a conflict of interest can coerce the author to cite the reviewer's publications prior to recommending publication. This can inflate the perceived citation impact of a researcher's work and their reputation in the scientific community, similar to excessive self-citation.
- Suggesting fake peer reviewers can happen when journals invite authors to recommend a list of suitable peer reviewers, along with their contact information. In some cases, authors have recommended a "reviewer" for whom they provide a fake email address that in fact belongs to the author. If the editor follows the author's reviewer recommendation, the author can then write their own review.
- A rarer case of scientific misconduct is editorial misconduct, where an editor does not declare conflicts of interest, creates pseudonyms to review papers, gives strongly worded editorial decisions to support reviews suggesting to add excessive citations to their own unrelated works or to add themselves as a co-author or their name to the title of the manuscript.

=== Photo manipulation ===
Manipulation of images constitutes a form of research misconduct that some journals actively screen for because it can be detected through image analysis tools. In 2006, the Journal of Cell Biology gained publicity for instituting tests to detect photo manipulation in papers that were being considered for publication. This was in response to the increased usage of programs such as Adobe Photoshop by scientists, which facilitate photo manipulation. Since then more publishers, including the Nature Publishing Group, have instituted similar tests and require authors to minimize and specify the extent of photo manipulation when a manuscript is submitted for publication. However, there is little evidence to indicate that such tests are applied rigorously. One Nature paper published in 2009 has subsequently been reported to contain around 20 separate instances of image fraud.

Although the type of manipulation that is allowed can depend greatly on the type of experiment that is presented and also differ from one journal to another, in general the following manipulations are not allowed:

- splicing together different images to represent a single experiment
- changing brightness and contrast of only a part of the image
- any change that conceals information, even when it is considered to be non-specific, which includes:
  - changing brightness and contrast to leave only the most intense signal
  - using clone tools to hide information
- showing only a very small part of the photograph so that additional information is not visible

Image manipulations are typically done on visually repetitive images such as those of blots and microscope images.

== Motivations ==
According to David Goodstein of Caltech, there are multiple motivators for scientists to commit misconduct, which are briefly summarised here. Research on the motivations for scientific misconduct often cites publication pressure and career incentives as contributing factors.

- Career pressure – Science is a very strongly career-driven discipline. Scientists depend on their record of achievement to receive ongoing support and funding, and a good reputation relies largely on the publication of high-profile scientific papers. Hence, there is a strong imperative to "publish or perish". This pressure is stronger in some research settings than others, contributing to the increased prevalence of misconduct in some parts of the world than others. This may motivate desperate (or fame-hungry) scientists to fabricate results.
- Ease of fabrication – In many scientific fields, results are often difficult to reproduce accurately, being obscured by noise, artifacts, and other extraneous data. That means that even if a scientist does falsify data, they may expect to get away with it – or at least claim innocence if their results conflict with others in the same field. There are few strongly backed systems to investigate possible violations, attempt to press charges, or punish deliberate misconduct. It is relatively easy to cheat although difficult to know exactly how many scientists fabricate data.
- Monetary gain – In many scientific fields, the most lucrative options for professionals are often selling opinions. Corporations can pay experts to support products directly or indirectly via conferences. Psychologists can make money by repeatedly acting as an expert witness in custody proceedings for the same law firms.
- Political bias among scientists can motivate reduced scientific integrity and academic bias.

== Typology ==
Michelle Bergadaà, a University of Geneva management professor and founder of the Institute for Research and Action on Fraud and Plagiarism in Academia (IRAFPA), has proposed a classification of academics who commit scientific misconduct. Drawing and institutional investigations and mediation conducted through IRAFPA, she distinguishes four profiles of what she calls "knowledge offenders" (délinquants de la connaissance), each associated with distinct motivations and calling for distinct remedial measures.

- The academic tinkerer or academic bricoleur — a term borrowed from Claude Lévi-Strauss (see also works by Michel de Certeau) — is familiar with academic values, but drifts into transgression through excessive commitments or career pressure (identified above among the motivations for misconduct). This profile acknowledges responsibility and is receptive to reparation.
- The academic cheat transgresses by conforming to a research group whose practices are already irregular, rather than on individual initiative. Bergadaà relates this profile to Leon Festinger's work on cognitive dissonance and suggests that reassignment to another team is often sufficient remedy.
- The academic fraudster acts autonomously and is associated with hyperprolific publishing in journals where review is less demanding. They too are familiar with academic values, but deliberately circumvent them. Unlike other profiles, they concede the facts readily once confronted, often negotiating a departure as they show little attachment to their institution.
- The academic manipulator combines charisma with a refusal to accept the account of their conduct observed by investigators, typically recasting allegations as the product of jealousy or conspiracy. Bergadaà regards this profile as the least amenable to remediation.

== Roles ==
=== Scientists ===
All authors of a scientific publication are expected to have made reasonable attempts to check findings submitted to academic journals for publication.

Simultaneous submission of scientific findings to more than one journal or duplicate publication of findings is usually regarded as misconduct, under what is known as the Ingelfinger rule, named after the editor of The New England Journal of Medicine 1967–1977, Franz Ingelfinger.

Guest authorship (where there is stated authorship in the absence of involvement, also known as gift authorship) and ghost authorship (where the real author is not listed as an author) are commonly regarded as forms of research misconduct. In some cases coauthors of faked research have been accused of inappropriate behavior or research misconduct for failing to verify reports authored by others or by a commercial sponsor. Examples include the case of Gerald Schatten who co-authored with Hwang Woo-Suk, the case of Professor Geoffrey Chamberlain named as guest author of papers fabricated by Malcolm Pearce, (Chamberlain was exonerated from collusion in Pearce's deception) – and the coauthors with Jan Hendrik Schön at Bell Laboratories. More recent cases include that of Charles Nemeroff, then the editor-in-chief of Neuropsychopharmacology, and a well-documented case involving the drug Actonel.

Authors are expected to keep all study data for later examination even after publication. The failure to keep data may be regarded as misconduct. Some scientific journals require that authors provide information to allow readers to determine whether the authors might have commercial or non-commercial conflicts of interest. Authors are also commonly required to provide information about ethical aspects of research, particularly where research involves human or animal participants or use of biological material. Provision of incorrect information to journals may be regarded as misconduct. Financial pressures on universities have encouraged this type of misconduct. The majority of recent cases of alleged misconduct involving undisclosed conflicts of interest or failure of the authors to have seen scientific data involve collaborative research between scientists and biotechnology companies.

=== Research institution ===
In general, defining whether an individual is guilty of misconduct requires a detailed investigation by the individual's employing academic institution. Such investigations require detailed and rigorous processes and can be extremely costly. Furthermore, the more senior the individual under suspicion, the more likely it is that conflicts of interest will compromise the investigation. In many countries (with the notable exception of the United States) acquisition of funds on the basis of fraudulent data is not a legal offence and there is consequently no regulator to oversee investigations into alleged research misconduct. Universities therefore have few incentives to investigate allegations in a robust manner, or act on the findings of such investigations if they vindicate the allegation.

Well publicised cases illustrate the potential role that senior academics in research institutions play in concealing scientific misconduct. A King's College (London) internal investigation showed research findings from one of their researchers to be 'at best unreliable, and in many cases spurious' but the college took no action, such as retracting relevant published research or preventing further episodes from occurring.

In a more recent case an internal investigation at the National Centre for Cell Science (NCCS), Pune determined that there was evidence of misconduct by Gopal Kundu, but an external committee was then organised which dismissed the allegation, and the NCCS issued a memorandum exonerating the authors of all charges of misconduct. Undeterred by the NCCS exoneration, the relevant journal (Journal of Biological Chemistry) withdrew the paper based on its own analysis.

=== Scientific peers ===
Some academics believe that scientific colleagues who suspect scientific misconduct should take informal action themselves, or report their concerns. This question is of great importance since much research suggests that it is very difficult for people to act or come forward when they see unacceptable behavior, unless they have help from their organizations. A written guide and the existence of a confidential organizational ombudsman may help people who are uncertain about what to do, or afraid of bad consequences for their speaking up.

=== Journals ===
Journals are responsible for safeguarding the research record and hence have a critical role in dealing with suspected misconduct. This is recognised by the Committee on Publication Ethics (COPE), which has issued clear guidelines on the form (e.g. retraction) that concerns over the research record should take.

- The COPE guidelines state that journal editors should consider retracting a publication if they have clear evidence that the findings are unreliable, either as a result of misconduct (e.g. data fabrication) or honest error (e.g. miscalculation or experimental error). Retraction is also appropriate in cases of redundant publication, plagiarism and unethical research.
- Journal editors should consider issuing an expression of concern if they receive inconclusive evidence of research or publication misconduct by the authors, there is evidence that the findings are unreliable but the authors' institution will not investigate the case, they believe that an investigation into alleged misconduct related to the publication either has not been, or would not be, fair and impartial or conclusive, or an investigation is underway but a judgement will not be available for a considerable time.
- Journal editors should consider issuing a correction if a small portion of an otherwise reliable publication proves to be misleading (especially because of honest error), or the author / contributor list is incorrect (i.e. a deserving author has been omitted or somebody who does not meet authorship criteria has been included).

Evidence emerged in 2012 that journals learning of cases where there is strong evidence of possible misconduct, with issues potentially affecting a large portion of the findings, frequently fail to issue an expression of concern or correspond with the host institution so that an investigation can be undertaken. In one case, Nature allowed a corrigendum to be published despite clear evidence of image fraud. Subsequent retraction of the paper required the actions of an independent whistleblower.

The cases of Joachim Boldt and Yoshitaka Fujii in anaesthesiology focussed attention on the role that journals play in perpetuating scientific fraud as well as how they can deal with it. In the Boldt case, the editors-in-chief of 18 specialist journals (generally anesthesia and intensive care) made a joint statement regarding 88 published clinical trials conducted without Ethics Committee approval. In the Fujii case, involving nearly 200 papers, the journal Anesthesia & Analgesia, which published 24 of Fujii's papers, has accepted that its handling of the issue was inadequate. Following publication of a letter to the editor from Kranke and colleagues in April 2000, along with a non-specific response from Dr. Fujii, there was no follow-up on the allegation of data manipulation and no request for an institutional review of Dr. Fujii's research. Anesthesia & Analgesia went on to publish 11 additional manuscripts by Dr. Fujii following the 2000 allegations of research fraud, with Editor Steven Shafer stating in March 2012 that subsequent submissions to the journal by Dr. Fujii should not have been published without first vetting the allegations of fraud. In April 2012 Shafer led a group of editors to write a joint statement, in the form of an ultimatum made available to the public, to a large number of academic institutions where Fujii had been employed, offering these institutions the chance to attest to the integrity of the bulk of the allegedly fraudulent papers.

=== Research paper mills ===
In August 2025, a study published in the Proceedings of the National Academy of Sciences uncovered evidence of large-scale scientific publishing fraud involving networks of editors, authors, and research paper mills. The investigation, reported by Science magazine, suggested that misconduct in academic publishing "has become an industry" due to the growing influence of paper mills and brokers.

== Consequences ==
=== Consequences for scientific knowledge ===
The consequences of scientific fraud vary based on the severity of the fraud, the level of notice it receives, and how long it goes undetected. For cases of fabricated evidence, the consequences can be wide-ranging, with others working to confirm (or refute) the false finding, or with research agendas being distorted to address the fraudulent evidence. The Piltdown Man fraud is a case in point: The significance of the bona-fide fossils that were being found was muted for decades because they disagreed with Piltdown Man and the preconceived notions that those faked fossils supported. In addition, the prominent paleontologist Arthur Smith Woodward spent time at Piltdown each year until he died, trying to find more Piltdown Man remains. The misdirection of resources kept others from taking the real fossils more seriously and delayed the reaching of a correct understanding of human evolution. (The Taung Child, which should have been the death knell for the view that the human brain evolved first, was instead treated very critically because of its disagreement with the Piltdown Man evidence.)

In the case of Prof. Don Poldermans, the misconduct occurred in reports of trials of treatment to prevent death and myocardial infarction in patients undergoing operations. The trial reports were relied upon to issue guidelines that applied for many years across North America and Europe.

In the case of Dr Alfred Steinschneider, two decades and tens of millions of research dollars were lost trying to find the elusive link between infant sleep apnea, which Steinschneider said he had observed and recorded in his laboratory, and sudden infant death syndrome (SIDS), of which he stated it was a precursor. The cover was blown in 1994, 22 years after Steinschneider's 1972 Pediatrics paper claiming such an association, when Waneta Hoyt, the mother of the patients in the paper, was arrested, indicted and convicted on five counts of second-degree murder for the smothering deaths of her five children. While that in itself was bad enough, the paper, presumably written as an attempt to save infants' lives, ironically was ultimately used as a defense by parents suspected in multiple deaths of their own children in cases of Münchausen syndrome by proxy. The 1972 Pediatrics paper was cited in 404 papers in the interim and is still listed on PubMed without comment.

=== Regulatory violations and consequences ===
Title 10 Code of Federal Regulation (CFR) Part 50.5, Deliberate Misconduct of the U.S. Nuclear Regulatory Commission (NRC) regulations, addresses the prohibition of certain activities by individual involved in NRC-licensed activities. 10 CFR 50.5 is designed to ensure the safety and integrity of nuclear operations. 10 CFR Part 50.9, Completeness and Accuracy of Information, focuses on the requirements for providing information and data to the NRC. The intent of 10 CFR 50.5 is to deter and penalize intentional wrongdoing (i.e., violations). 10 CFR 50.9 is crucial in maintaining transparency and reliability in the nuclear industry, which effectively emphasizes honesty and integrity in maintaining the safety and security of nuclear operations. Providing false or misleading information or data to the NRC is therefore a violation of 10 CFR 50.9.

Violation of any of these rules can lead to severe penalties, including termination, fines and criminal prosecution. It can also result in the revocation of licenses or certifications, thereby barring individuals or entities from participating in any NRC-licensed activities in the future.

=== Consequences for those who report misconduct ===
The potentially severe consequences for individuals who are found to have engaged in misconduct also reflect on the institutions that host or employ them and also on the participants in any peer review process that has allowed the publication of questionable research. This means that a range of actors in any case may have a motivation to suppress any evidence or suggestion of misconduct. Persons who expose such cases, commonly called whistleblowers, find themselves open to retaliation by a number of different means. These negative consequences for exposers of misconduct have driven the development of whistle blowers charters – designed to protect those who raise concerns.

== Incidence ==
The vast majority of cases of scientific misconduct may not be reported. The number of article retractions in 2022 was nearly 5,500, but Ivan Oransky and Adam Marcus, co-founders of Retraction Watch, estimate that at least 100,000 retractions should occur every year, with only about one in five being due to "honest error". One survey of researchers found that 29% of researchers reported misusing authorship at least once during their career, such as giving "gift authorship" to people who were not involved in the research.

A 2025 study by Northwestern university after reviewing aggregated data on the lists of deindexed journals from literature aggregators such as Web of Science, Scopus, Medline, data from Retraction Watch and PubPeer found that while the total number of research publications double every 15 years, articles from suspected research paper mills double every 1.5 years while the number of retracted articles double every 3.3 years and number of articles with PubPeer comments double every 3.6 years.

Recent work by Ilka Agricola and colleagues has for the first time systematically documented fraudulent practices in mathematical publishing and proposed concrete measures to address them. In "Fraudulent Publishing in the Mathematical Sciences," Agricola et al. analyze how predatory journals, paper mills, and citation cartels exploit bibliometric incentives, warning that unvetted "proofs" in low-quality outlets can mislead subsequent research. Published simultaneously on arXiv and in the October 2025 issue of the Notices of the American Mathematical Society, the report highlights alarming patterns—such as Clarivate's 2023 exclusion of mathematics from its Highly Cited Researchers list due to metric gaming—and traces the emergence of systematic fraud in a field previously thought immune to such issues. A follow-up paper, "How to Fight Fraudulent Publishing in the Mathematical Sciences," endorsed by the International Mathematical Union and International Council for Industrial and Applied Mathematics, offers joint recommendations for researchers, institutions, and funders, including discouraging reliance on raw publication and citation counts, promoting expert peer review over bibliometrics, and using curated databases (e.g., zbMATH Open) to vet journals. Commenting on these findings, Agricola emphasized that "fraudulent publishing undermines trust in science and scientific results and therefore fuels antiscience movements".

== Notable cases ==
In 1998 Andrew Wakefield published a fraudulent research paper in The Lancet claiming links between the MMR vaccine, autism, and inflammatory bowel disease. In 2010, he was found guilty of dishonesty in his research and banned from medicine by the UK General Medical Council following an investigation by Brian Deer of the London Sunday Times.

The claims in Wakefield's paper were widely reported, leading to a sharp drop in vaccination rates in the UK and Ireland and outbreaks of mumps and measles. Promotion of the claimed link continues to fuel the anti-vaccination movement.

In 2011 Diederik Stapel, a highly regarded Dutch social psychologist, was discovered to have fabricated data in dozens of studies on human behaviour. He has been called "the biggest con man in academic science".

In 2020, Sapan Desai and his coauthors published two papers in the prestigious medical journals The Lancet and The New England Journal of Medicine, early in the COVID-19 pandemic. The papers were based on a very large dataset published by Surgisphere, a company owned by Desai. The dataset was exposed as a fabrication, and the papers were soon retracted.

In 2024, Eliezer Masliah, head of the Division of Neuroscience at the National Institute on Aging, was suspected of having manipulated and inappropriately reused images in over 100 scientific papers spanning several decades, including those that were used by the FDA to greenlight testing for the experimental drug prasinezumab as a treatment for Parkinson's.

== Proposed responses ==
=== Detection ===
There are several tools available to aid in the detection of plagiarism and multiple publication within biomedical literature. One tool developed in 2006 by researchers in Dr. Harold Garner's laboratory at the University of Texas Southwestern Medical Center at Dallas is Déjà vu, an open-access database containing several thousand instances of duplicate publication. All of the entries in the database were discovered through the use of text data mining algorithm eTBLAST, also created in Dr. Garner's laboratory. The creation of Déjà vu and the subsequent classification of several hundred articles contained therein have ignited much discussion in the scientific community concerning issues such as ethical behavior, journal standards, and intellectual copyright. Studies within this database have been published in journals such as Nature and Science, among others.

Other tools which may be used to detect fraudulent data include error analysis. Measurements generally have a small amount of error, and repeated measurements of the same item will generally result in slight differences in readings. These differences can be analyzed, and follow certain known mathematical and statistical properties. Should a set of data appear to be too faithful to the hypothesis, i.e., the amount of error that would normally be in such measurements does not appear, a conclusion can be drawn that the data may have been forged. Error analysis alone is typically not sufficient to prove that data have been falsified or fabricated, but it may provide the supporting evidence necessary to confirm suspicions of misconduct.

=== Scientific culture ===
A study found scientific integrity policies and a culture of mutual criticism tends to reduce scientific misconduct. Since 2012, the Declaration on Research Assessment (DORA), from San Francisco, gathered many institutions, publishers, and individuals committing to improving the metrics used to assess research and to stop focusing on the journal impact factor. Kirby Lee and Lisa Bero suggest, "Although reviewing raw data can be difficult, time-consuming and expensive, having such a policy would hold authors more accountable for the accuracy of their data and potentially reduce scientific fraud or misconduct."

== See also ==
- Academic dishonesty
- Archaeological forgery
- Bioethics
- Bullying in academia
- Committee on Publication Ethics
- Conflicts of interest in academic publishing
- Danish Committees on Scientific Dishonesty
- Data fabrication
- Engineering ethics
- Fabrication (science)
- Hippocratic Oath for scientists
- Intellectual inbreeding
- International Committee of Medical Journal Editors
- Japanese scientific misconduct allegations
- List of cognitive biases
- List of experimental errors and frauds in physics
- List of topics characterized as pseudoscience
- Misconduct
- Replication crisis
- Reproducibility
- Research ethics
- Research integrity
- Research Integrity Risk Index
- Retractions in academic publishing
- Scientific plagiarism in India
- Scientific plagiarism in the United States
- Plagiarism#Self-plagiarism
- Sexism in academia
- Sham peer review
- Source criticism
- United States Office of Research Integrity (ORI)
- Betrayers of the Truth: Fraud and Deceit in the Halls of Science
- EASE Guidelines for Authors and Translators of Scientific Articles
- Straight and Crooked Thinking
- The Great Betrayal: Fraud In Science
- Workplace bullying in academia
