= Himalayan fossil hoax =

Geological hoax in India

The Himalayan fossil hoax (also called the case of the peripatetic fossils and the Himalayan hoax) is a case of scientific misconduct perpetrated by Indian palaeontologist Vishwa Jit Gupta of Panjab University. From the 1960s onwards, Gupta studied the geology and fossil record of the Himalayas. He wrote hundreds of scientific papers that were assumed to be fundamental to understanding the geological formation of the Himalayas. Australian geologist John Talent from Macquarie University followed Gupta's research and happened to visit the Himalayas where he found that Gupta's fossils did not appear to come from the geological strata of the Himalayas and were in his view odd — some being extraordinarily similar to fossils from distant regions. In 1987, in the presence of Gupta at a scientific conference in Canada, Talent showed why be believed that some of Gupta's fossils were identical to those found in Morocco. Talent and his student Glenn Brock reanalysed Gupta's research, presenting evidence that Gupta had from his student days onwards practised what they believed to be plagiarism and fraudulent reuse of data.

The paleontologists Gilbert Klapper and Willi Ziegler had suspected misconduct in 1978 as they saw that conodont fossils used by Gupta resembled some from Buffalo, New York collected in the 19th century by George Jennings Hinde. Gupta's colleague Arun Deep Ahluwalia alleged that Gupta could have planted conodont fossils in 1980 to convince K. J. Budurov of the existence of the specimens in the Himalayas. In 1981, Gupta allegedly tricked Philippe Janvier into describing a fish fossil that was actually from China as a new Himalayan species. In 1986, Talent stated that Gupta had likely used ammonoid fossils from Morocco and sold in Paris to report these as Himalayan.

Talent publicly announced what he believed to be Gupta's misconduct at the Calgary, 1987 International Symposium on the Devonian System. His criticism was published in the Courier Forschungsinstitut Senckenberg in 1988. The matter became widely known when Talent published the summarised story from Courier in Nature in 1989, and Roger Lewin published his own study in Science. Gupta's Himalayan fossils appeared to have been collected from other regions. He had claimed that his fossils had come from Himalayan places, which he did not appear to have visited. The University Grants Commission of India immediately withdrew its funding to Gupta. Although Panjab University suspended him for 11 months, it permitted him to continue service until 2002 when he retired. The case became what India's Down to Earth magazine called the "greatest scientific fraud of the century", or according to Talent, "the biggest paleontological fraud of all time". Gupta was named "the greatest fossil faker of all time", the "most notorious known paleontological fraudster", and "Houdini of the Himalayas."

== Background ==
Vishwa Jit Gupta worked for his Ph.D. under the supervision of Mulk Raj Sahni at Panjab University in Chandigarh. Focussing on the palaeontology and geological features of the Himalayas, he started his main research and field work in 1963. He and Sahni reported the initial findings in five research papers in 1964, − a discovery of graptolites in two papers in Nature, a fossil assemblage in two papers in Current Science, and one in the Journal of the Palaeontological Society of India. His doctoral thesis was entitled Palaeontology, Stratigraphy and Structure of the Palaeozoic Rocks of the Area South-East of Srinagar upon which he received his degree in 1966.

Over 25 years, Gupta published at least 458 research articles and five books. His publications were recognised as standard references on the geology and fossil record of the Himalayan region. As an honour, the Panjab University awarded him a D.Sc. and in 1972 created him a separate chair, Director of the Institute of Paleontology.

Technical incongruities in Gupta's research were first pointed out by Sampige Venkateshaiya Srikantia, Om Narain Bhargava and Hari Mohan Kapoor of the Geological Survey of India. In 1978, Srikantia's team described the presence of bivalve mollusc fossils (Eurydesma cordatum and Deltopecten mitchelli) from Lahaul Valley, Himachal Pradesh, following a scientific exploration of the Himalayas. They came across the accounts of Gupta on the identification of Eurydesma at two locations in the Himalayas. In 1970 Gupta had reported finding the fossils in Lachulung La, identifying the deposits as Permian (Cisuralian, around 298-272 million years old) limestone. In 1973, he again described the same specimens from the Malung shale of Lahaul Valley in his book Indian Palaeozoic Stratigraphy. Here, Gupta assigned the fossils to a much younger Upper Permian (Lopingian, around 259-251 Ma). Srikantia's team noticed not only that Gupta's bivalves could not have existed in such different ages, but also found critical errors. They determined that Lachulung La was of a much younger series, the Triassic-Jurassic (250-145 Ma); Malung shale was already known to be of Upper Triassic (208-201 Ma). Their report ends with a cautionary statement: "the sequence built up by Gupta in the Sarchu area cannot be used for any stratigraphic work."

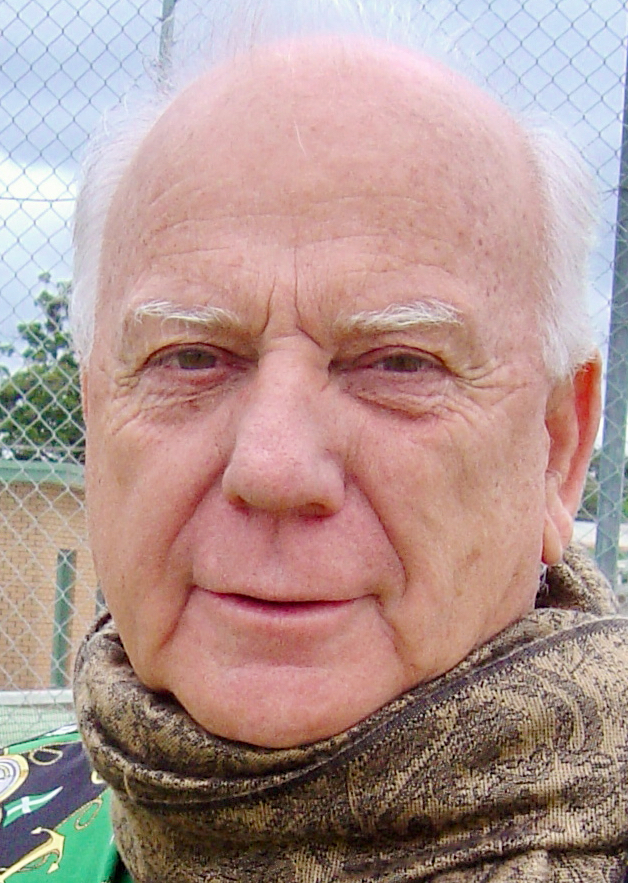
John Alfred Talent investigated Gupta's fraud.

In 1978, the American geologist Gilbert Klapper from the University of Iowa met Willi Ziegler at the University of Marburg in Germany to discuss the progress of research on extinct jawless vertebrates, the conodonts. At that time, Ziegler had Australian guests, John W. Pickett from the Geological Survey of New South Wales and his associate John Alfred Talent from Macquarie University in Sydney. Talent was by then an established expert in Devonian geology of Australian and Indian regions. Talent had led UNESCO's first International Geological Correlation Programme, exploring the Himalayas in 1973−1977. Talent and Pickett had shared their studies of the region, and discussed Gupta's conodonts from the Devonian period. They had examined 20 locations around Nepal, where Gupta had claimed new species from Triassic, Permian, Carboniferous, and Devonian deposits (rocks ranging from around 420 to 299 million years old), and were surprised to find no fossils except one which was from the Silurian, not the Devonian. In one specific case, they explored the area where Gupta and William B. N. Berry (Director of the University of California Museum of Paleontology) had reported in 1966 several fossils from Kashmir. In their view, not only were the rocks incorrectly described, but they were so deformed no fossil could have been present.

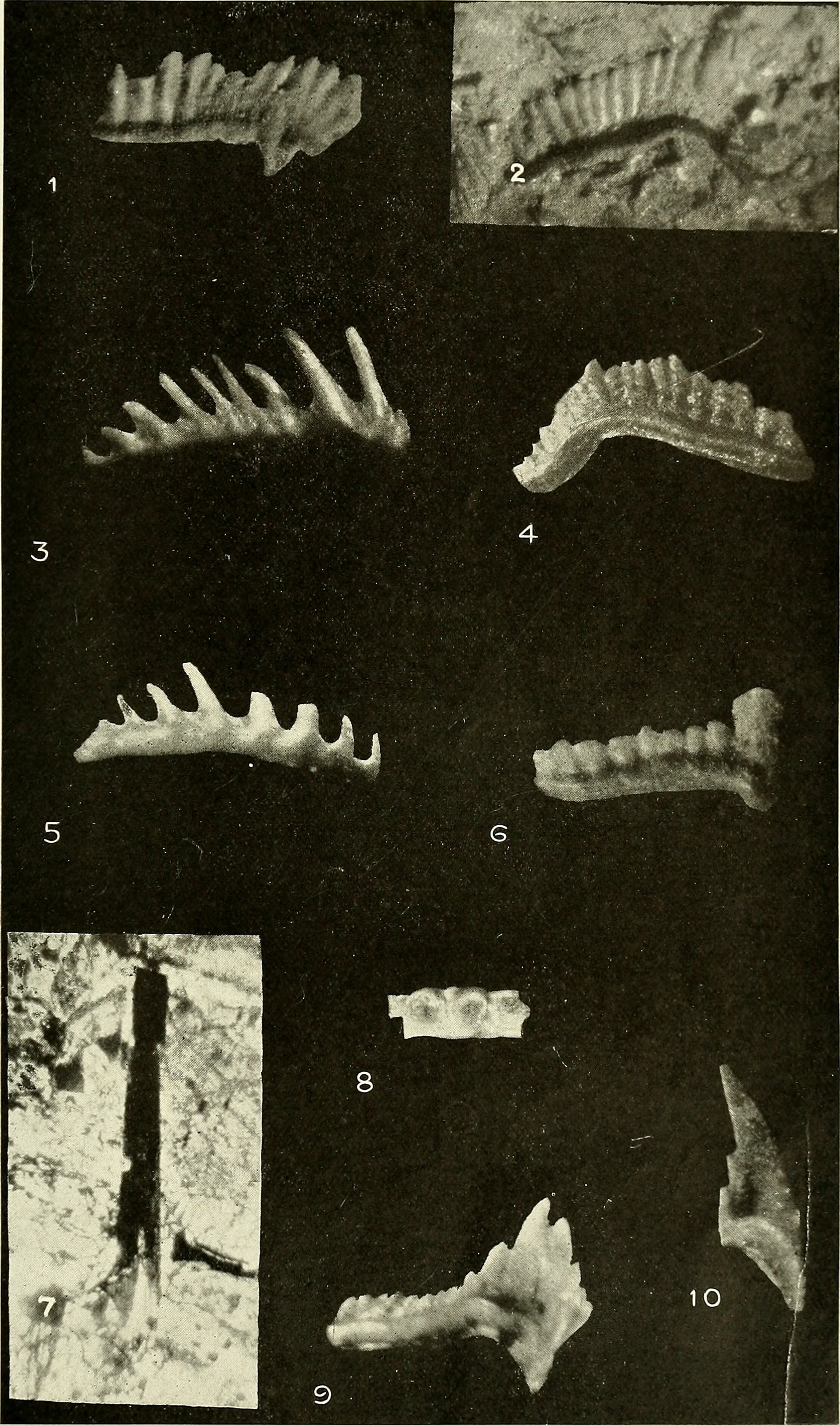
Conodonts from Eighteen Mile Creek. Numbers 7 and 10 had been reported by G. J. Hinde.

When Klapper and Ziegler learned of this, they looked into some of Gupta's papers and quickly noticed two photographs of the same conodont. Gupta's report indicated they were collected from sites several miles apart. They thought that it could be a case of accidental duplication of the same photograph. Real suspicion arose when, they reported, they noticed that Gupta's fossils resembled those collected by George Jennings Hinde from the Eighteen Mile Creek near Buffalo, New York, that had been presented before the Geological Society of London a century before, in 1876.

The first methodical and critical analysis of Gupta's research records was done by Prem N. Agarwal and S. N. Singh of the University of Lucknow. In 1980, Agarwal and Singh reviewed research development in the general palaeontology of the Himalayas in which they also examined Gupta's papers. First, they reported that the long list of conodonts described by Gupta in 1978 bore an uncanny resemblance to those in the doctoral thesis of Nand Lal Chhabra submitted to the University of Lucknow in 1977. In their words: "It is really a surprising coincidence, unless either of the authors has drawn upon the data of the other without proper reference or acknowledgement." Gupta's conodonts and their geological settings turned out to be a major issue. What Agarwal and Singh reported next were the seemingly conflicting descriptions of fossils and their locations in most of Gupta's papers; a species reported in one paper was absent in another report of the same location. In their view, the information was so comprehensively chaotic and inconsistent that they concluded: "These anomalies in different papers by the same author/s is not understandable, unless they are serious printing mistakes."

In 1987, Talent visited Paris, going to Alain Carion's shop of minerals, fossils and meteorites, named the Carion Minéraux, on Île Saint-Louis. He purchased many fossils there, including some extinct ammonoid cephalopods that came from a fossil site near Erfoud, Morocco. He quickly came to believe that the Moroccan fossils were very similar to Gupta's fossils from the Himalayas. Talent decided to compile what he saw as discrepancies in Gupta's research. With his former student and associate Glenn Anthony Brock, he systematically reanalysed Gupta's published works, establishing that in his opinion Gupta was a prolific fraudster who had falsified, recycled, and plagiarised research data in hundreds of publications. Brock alleged that Gupta had used images of fossils analysed by British geologists in the early 20th century, explaining: "[And] all that Gupta had done was take some scissors and cut out the specimens, put them down on a new plate with a new number on them and claim them as his own – and these were samples from somewhere very different, from parts of Somalia."

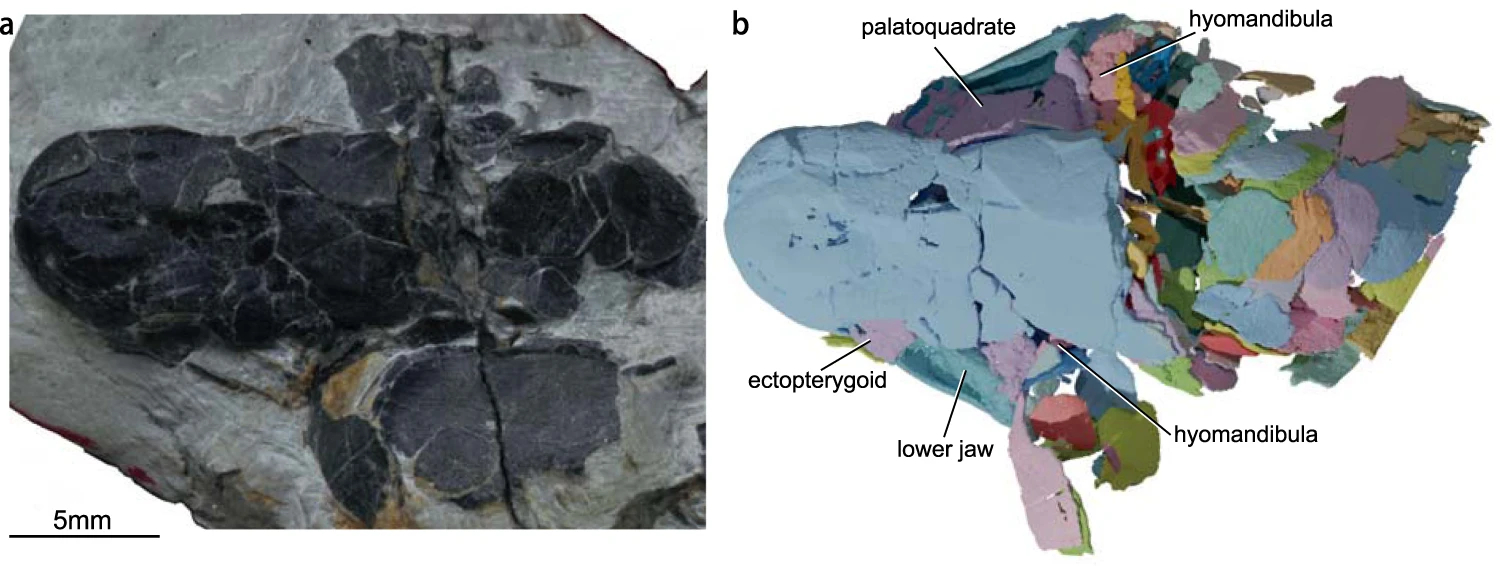
Youngolepis praecursor, a fish fossil from Yunnan, China, which Gupta claimed was also present in the Himalayas.

In 1980, Gupta met Philippe Janvier at the Museum of Natural History in Paris and showed him "a magnificent fossil fish skull" which he brought along. Gupta had travelled to China, but claimed that he had collected the fossil from Zanskar, Ladakh, at the foothills of the Himalayas. Recognising the fossil as a new species, Janvier made the identification, and with Gupta submitted the discovery to the journal Recent Researches in Geology the next year. Shortly after this, Janvier went to Sweden where he met Zhang Miman (Meemann Chang), director of the Chinese Institute of Vertebrate Paleontology and Paleoanthropology, who was working on some fish fossils from China. Janvier immediately noticed that some of these fossils were exactly like the one he and Gupta had recently described. On inquiry, Miman explained to him that the particular specimen was an extinct Devonian coelacanth species she had named Youngolepis praecursor (formally reported by Miman in 1995). She said that the species was found in Yunnan and North Vietnam, and so common in those regions that the fossils were frequently used as gifts to visitors. Chang had already published the discovery in January 1981. Janvier told Gupta to hold their publication, but it was eventually published in 1982 with a few modifications based on Chang's paper. Uncomfortable with the purported origin of the "Himalayan" fossil, Janvier published a note of concern in Bulletin of the Indian Geologists Association, remarking that Chang's and Gupta's specimens were "strikingly similar." Although Gupta avowed that he had never been to the fossil site in China, it was known that he had had a trip to China just prior to going to France. Janvier was convinced that Gupta had fooled him: "Now, there is no evidence that Gupta brought the fish fossil with him from China, but I'm 99% sure he did."

== The exposé ==
=== Calgary symposium ===
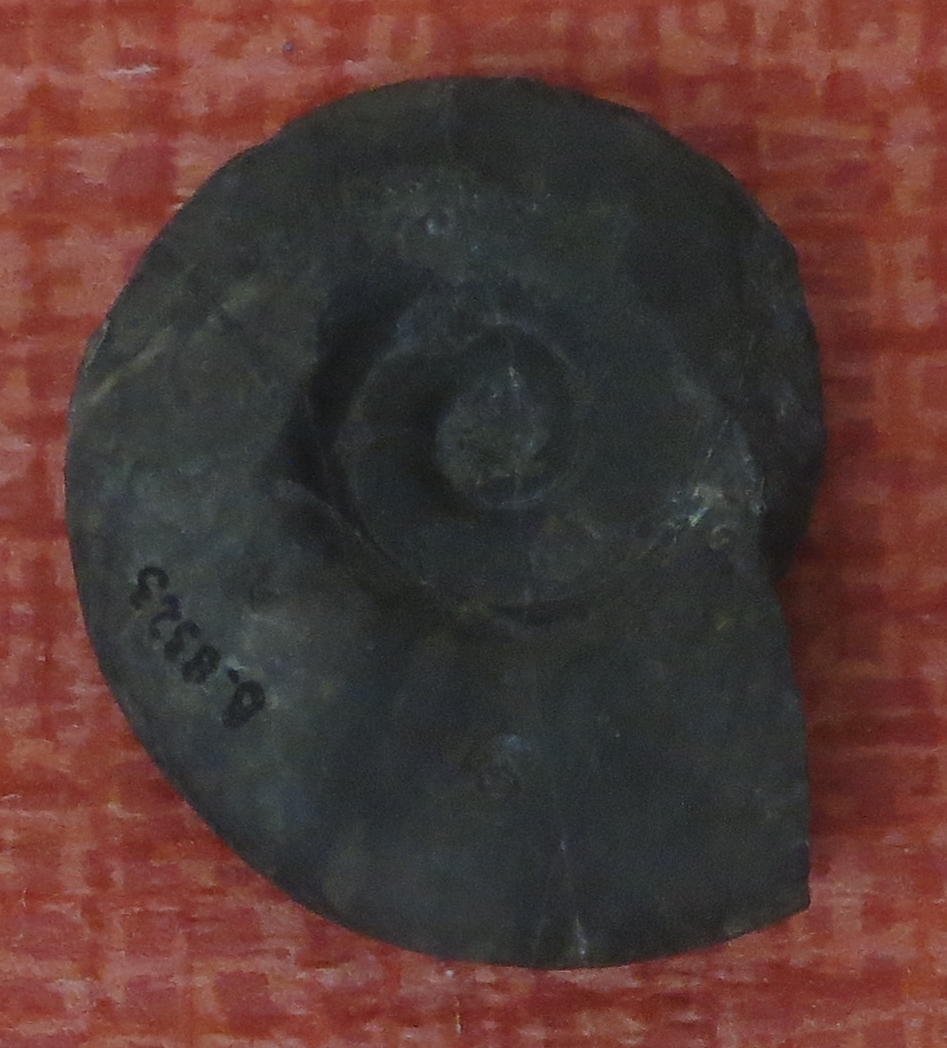
A genuine ammonoid fossil, Ophiceras sakuntala, from the Himalayas.

Gupta's conduct was first publicly reported at the International Symposium on the Devonian System held at Calgary, Canada, from 17 to 20 August 1987. Gupta and the German palaeontologist Heinrich Karl Erben (Institut für Paläontologie, Bonn) had published in Paläontologische Zeitschrift in 1983 reporting a series of Devonian ammonoids from Himachal Pradesh. When Talent presented his own research, he added a discussion on the Himalayan fossils, including Gupta's ammonoids and those from Morocco, displaying them side by side on the screen; they appeared "exactly the same". Another case of apparently identical fossils presented by Talent was from Gupta's reports of two conodonts in 1975, allegedly collected from two sites 600 km (370 miles) apart and described in two different papers. One scientist pointed to Gupta, who was sitting on the front row, and said: "Well, how do you explain having exactly the same fossils in two localities 600 kilometres apart?" The Australian Broadcasting Corporation reported that an infuriated Gupta stormed out of the room and re-entered clenching his fist trying to punch Talent, but was prevented by other participants; and that Gupta subsequently shouted to the organisers, demanding the list of all participants and Talent's manuscript.

The committee of the Calgary symposium informed the Vice Chancellor of Panjab University of the incident as well as of the associated issues with Gupta's research, but no action appears to have been taken. In spite of the public exposition, only fossil experts at the symposium knew of the case, and Gupta continued to publish research papers.

=== Courier publication ===
The director of Naturmuseum Senckenberg in Frankfurt, Germany, had attended the Calgary symposium and asked Talent to allow publication of his presentation; he agreed. The account was published in the serial Courier Forschungsinstitut Senckenberg as a 57-page article "Silurian and Devonian of India, Nepal and Bhutan: Biostratigraphic and Palaeobiogeographic Anomalies" in 1988. Picket, Rajendra Kumar Goel, and Arvind Kumar Jain of the University of Roorkee, India, co-authored the paper. The document identified over a hundred alleged fossil frauds in Gupta's research, involving five books and 458 articles, published with 128 co-authors over a period of 28 years. However, the Courier had a limited circulation and the news was not widely read.

=== Publications in Nature and Science ===
On 20 April 1989, Nature published Talent's invited three-page summary of the Courier article. Talent provided reasons to suspect that Gupta's fossils were bought, stolen or received as gifts from various parts of the world, and not authentically collected from the Himalayan region, and that Gupta's research was substantially invalid. Talent concluded:

Rhinos in Rio? Kangaroos in Kashmir? Well, something as remarkable biogeographically is said to have occurred. At first sight it might appear that a whole circus of exotica – mainly invertebrate – was let loose and fossilized seriatim in the Palaeozoic and Mesozoic sequences of the Himalayas. Earth scientists in general, and palaeontologists in particular, have blissfully assumed that, apart from the Piltdown Man, their science was largely free from attempts to pollute the literature. There have been cases of practical jokes, and examples of misappropriation of materials by individuals over-eager to publish. But compared with the cornucopia of items disgorged into the stratigraphy of the Himalayan region over the past 25 years, such instances are mere bagatelles.

This publication immediately prompted media investigation from Science, as its news editor Roger Lewin contacted the scientists involved. Lewin published his report on 21 April 1989, including the following from Talent:

The database for the Silurian and Devonian of the Himalaya has become so extensively marred by error, inconsistency and implausibility as to throw grave doubts on the scientific validity of any conclusions that might be drawn from it. An appropriate way to approach this problem and clarify many of the questions raised would be through an independent fact-finding commission set up to probe most of the legions of paleontologically anomalous and suspect reports.

The story became widely known from further Nature and Science articles, especially through a series of four Nature articles titled "the peripatetic fossils" between 1989 and 1990; a defence from Gupta, comments by the Indian geologists Arun Deep Ahluwalia, S. B. Bhatia, and Udai K. Bassi; by the French paleontologist Philippe Janvier; the New Zealand paleontologist John Bruce Waterhouse; and through Talent's summary.

== The fossils ==
=== Conodonts ===
The principal fossils of dispute were the conodonts. One of the first and best-understood conodont fossils was from Amsdell Creek in New York, USA, which was determined as Devonian in age. With the help of the English geologists Frank H. T. Rhodes and R. L. Austin, Gupta reported a discovery titled "Devonian Conodonts from Kashmir" in Nature in 1967, the first conodont report from India, and continued to report discoveries of conodonts in and around Kashmir. According to Talent, "it is statistically beyond the bounds of possibility" that Devonian conodonts were present in the Himalayas, and that Gupta's specimens probably were those of the Amsdell Creek. Klapper concurred, saying, "[It] is impossible to be 100% certain that the conodonts Gupta reports on come from New York and not the Himalayas as he claims, but I am as certain as I can be."

Gary D. Webster, Carl B. Rexroad and Talent published "An evaluation of the V. J. Gupta conodont papers" in 1993 based on investigation of 19 of Gupta's collaborators. They reported that Gupta had recycled his conodont reports in 15 publications.

=== Ammonoids ===
Talent was convinced that Gupta's ammonoid specimens originally came from a fossil site near Erfoud, Morocco. The characteristic features showed their identity. Talent had come across the same Moroccan ammonoids at the fossil shop in Paris and noticed that they exactly matched the images Gupta had used in publications. He also discovered that Gupta had claimed the source of the conodonts and ammonoids as from the same rock strata, which could not have been the case since the two groups of animals lived 15 million years apart. By May 1989, Gupta emphatically wrote Erben that the fossils were authentically of the Himalayas, prompting Erben to make a statement in Paläontologische Zeitschrift defending his position, stating: "Whatever the truth in this highly detestable affair may be, my personal responsibility in the paper under discussion has been, and still is, restricted to its taxonomical and morphological parts as well as to the illustrations."

Webster published "An evaluation of the V. J. Gupta echinoderm papers, 1971–1989" in 1991 and asserted that the observation "leaves no doubt that these fraudulent practices were knowingly continued over the past 25 years." He found that 28 of Gupta's papers contained dubious information on the fossil discoveries.

== Gupta's alleged strategy ==
According to the geologists S. K. Shah and O. N. Bhargava, V. J. Gupta's strategy in the Himalayan fossil hoax was to enlist eminent scientists to carry out identifications and other work in good faith, lending credibility to his fraudulent research papers.

In the opinion of the geologists S. K. Shah and O. N. Bhargava, Gupta was careful in his research publications, asking eminent scientists to collaborate. He provided the fossils and the basic geological details, and allowed his collaborators to make the fossil identification, so that they became what Bhargava called "unsuspecting partners in crime", or as Bangalore Puttaiya Radhakrishna, editor of the Journal of the Geological Society of India wrote, unwitting "partners in the deception". As in his first major publication in Nature in 1967, Gupta was able to convince Rhodes from the University College of Swansea (later president of Cornell University) and Austin from the University of Southampton. Gary Webster at Washington State University had coauthored nine of Gupta's papers, and asserted that his identification of the crinoid fossils was genuine, but later stated that he was "virtually certain" they were obtained from places other than the Himalayas. Further, he stated that Gupta had "willfully tried to dupe the scientific community". By 1989, Gupta had collaborated with 128 scientists around the world, including Berry, Director of the University of California Museum of Paleontology, Kiril J. Budurov of the Bulgarian Academy of Sciences, Michael E. Brookfield of the University of Guelph in Ontario, J. B. Waterhouse of the University of Queensland, and many others. (Note: The many other academics included H. K. Erben, Gerhard R. Fuchs of the Geological Survey of Austria, Andrzej Gaździcki of the Polish Academy of Sciences, Janvier, Makoto Kato of Hokkaido University, Rhodes, Jovan Stöcklin from Zurich, Geneviève Termier of the University of Paris, Susan Turner of the University of Newcastle upon Tyne, and Gary Dean Webster of the Washington State University.) Gupta's most prolific foreign collaborator was Waterhouse who co-authored 19 research papers, followed by Webster with nine papers.

Gupta stressed repeatedly that he had sought experts from various countries to corroborate his findings. In his Nature commentary, he stated that the graptolites reported in his earliest works had been substantiated by Cyril James Stubblefield, then director of the Geological Survey of Great Britain, and that the fossil site had been verified by his doctoral supervisor Sahni in October 1964. Sahni's companions and travel records indicated that he did visit Kashmir at the time indicated, but only to attend a scientific seminar. Ashok Sahni, son of Sahni and colleague of Gupta, confirmed that in his view "Sahni neither visited the graptolite localities nor did he accompany the post-seminar field excursion."

In another case, Gupta investigated the lower Phuchauki in Nepal with Vinod Singh Chhetri from the Department of Mines and Geology, Kathmandu, in 1974. He published four solo papers between 1975 and 1976 including three on conodont finds. In 1977, he published a geological study in Chayanica Geologica with Chhetri's name on it but without the latter's knowledge or consent. When Chhetri learned of the publication, he requested Gupta for the data and fossil specimens so that he could confirm them; he never got a response. Gupta continued to report other fossils from different locations in Nepal, including a series of mammals from Gidhniya in western Nepal. Chhetri affirmed that Gupta had never explored Nepal other than Phuchauki (not even the upper area, contrary to Gupta's report), and had never collected any fossil of interest. Further, Talent discovered from Ziegler that he had trained Gupta on conodont analysis at Marburg. Ziegler recalled Gupta having conodonts similar to those of Amsdell Creek; asked why he was interested in the American fossils, Gupta answered that they were from Nepal. Talent noted that this was a year before Gupta's Nepal exploration, in 1973.

According to the editors of Himal Southasian magazine, one modus operandi of Gupta was to keep the locations of the fossils vague, so that it would be difficult for peers to vindicate or refute the reports. The Geological Society of India stated that when other scientists investigated, they were never able to find the exact location or the fossils in the area from where those had allegedly been collected. In their view, Gupta had shrewdly assumed that the Indian Government would restrict the use of detailed topographic or army maps for strategic reasons around the Himalayas, especially for foreigners. Gupta once said: "As an Indian, it is not possible for me to take such liberties [disclosing Himalayan maps to foreign scientists] and to go against the 'Law of the Land'."

Talent claimed that Gupta was an unapologetic plagiarist and thief. His 1966 thesis contained fossil images from the 1908 and 1912 reports of Frederick Richard Cowper Reed, a British geologist who had surveyed the Himalayan and Burma regions. The same images were used in two of Gupta's papers published in Panjab University Research Bulletin, in volumes 20 and 21. Gupta's conodont fossils most likely came from the Amsdell Creek specimens at Aberystwyth University in Wales where he had done research work. In 1992, researchers at the Aberystwyth University informed Nature that in their view, Gupta's fossils were identical to those missing from their collection. Brock alleged that Gupta appeared to have used fossil images from reports by early 20th century British geologists: "And all that Gupta had done was take some scissors and cut out the specimens, put them down on a new plate with a new number on them and claim them as his own – and these were samples from somewhere very different, from parts of Somalia."

In a Nature commentary, Arun Deep Ahluwalia, Gupta's colleague and co-author in several papers, admitted that Talent's accusations were valid. Ahluwalia stated that once during the visit of their Bulgarian friend K. J. Budurov (whom Gupta later described as the "most callous" collaborator) to Panjab University in 1980, Gupta apparently planted fossils in the limestone samples. As Budurov was about to examine the tiny fossils, Gupta insisted that he prepare fresh samples to let the samples settle down in a solution. Ahluwalia recollected that he had not seen the fossils from that particular sample earlier, but as Gupta "prepared" it, numerous conodonts became visible. Ahluwalia did not suspect any misdeed at the time but in hindsight was "rather embarrassed at having initially missed the assemblage, but was happy at the 'discovery'." The three of them published the discovery in two papers in 1982. Following Talent's allegations, Ahluwalia later processed the original rock sample and could find no fossils at all. He also cited several instances of fossils collected and reported from sites which Gupta apparently had never explored.

Himal Southasian reported that another colleague, Shashi Bhushan Bhatia, recalled his suspicion when Gupta told him that the rock samples from Kurig were of Devonian age, and gave Bhatia ostracod fossils that he claimed were from the same sediments. Bhatia stated that there were in his view two irregularities. One, his own exploration of the same site gave a much younger geological age, Permo-Carboniferous, and he could not recall a single instance of Gupta's having visited Kurig. In another, as Gupta requested, Bhatia took the samples to the Natural History Museum, London. There Bhatia analysed the specimens and found that they were the same those from Haragan Formation in Oklahoma. Yet, in good faith, he, Jain and Gupta reported the discovery of the Himalayan ostracod in 1982. When the controversy broke out in 1989, Bhatia consulted Robert Folke Lundin at Arizona State University, who stated that in his opinion the Himalayan ostracods were the same as the American specimens that he had described in 1968. On the same sediments, another collaborator, Udai K. Bassi of the Geological Survey of India, later verified that Kurig is not Devonian but a much younger Carboniferous sediment, and that the border and village records did not have any mention of Gupta visiting the site. Further, Gupta and Erben reported in 1983 the occurrence of Carnian (298 to 272 million years old) conodonts and ammonoids from Khimokul La. Bassi, who had surveyed the area several times, stated that there is no Carnian sediment there, and that neither the check-post register nor the villagers had any record of Gupta, Erben or other foreigners.

== Reactions ==
=== Talent and Gupta ===
Talent wrote that Gupta "inundated geological and biogeographical literature of the Himalayas with a blizzard of disinformation so extensive as to render the literature almost useless." Gupta said to The New York Times that he had invited Talent to Panjab University and the Himalayan sites to verify the research findings following the Calgary incident, but he had declined. In trying to undermine the accusations, he described the affair as "minor disagreements over taxonomy among experts." He defended himself by claiming Talent's allegations as "malicious bias and professional jealousy" based on lies that were "building up a story without any basis." He added, "We've had differences for the past 20 years, and he's trying to cash in on them." Talent stated that he did decline Gupta's invitation as he felt it was more appropriate for other scientists to make inspections independently. In addition, Gupta criticised Talent's approach and background:

John Talent has made sweeping pronouncements on Himalayan geology. Yet he is not an authority on the subject. I can only conclude that his attack on me was made for two reasons – to draw attention to himself and to deflect criticism of his own failure to contribute to Himalayan geology.

=== Gupta's defence ===
In September 1989, Gupta wrote a defence of his conduct in Nature. He stated that "Tagging the name of one person to the fossil collections Talent refers to is gravely misleading", because he had carried out most of the explorations to the disputed Himalayan sites "by various teams of geologists", not always including himself. Further, he noted that communications in "remote parts" of the Himalayan range had often been very poor, and rock and fossil samples had to be carried "with the help of porters and bearers" in the absence of roads. In addition, he stated that he had not been allowed to use "detailed topographic or army maps", so it had been hard to specify locations precisely. As for what Talent had called "faunal anomalies and incongruities", Gupta wrote that Himalayan geology was a "developing science where anomalies should provide food for thought." On his and Janvier's 1981 description of a Devonian fish, he stated that he had never visited Chang's institute or met her, so it was implausible that he would have been gifted the specimen. On the "graptolites and other fossils from the Muth Quartzite", Gupta stated that they had been examined by the British geologist C. J. Stubblefield; that the Indian paleontologist M. R. Sahni had visited the Kashmir fossil localities in 1964; and that the sequence of rocks straddled the boundary of Upper and Lower Devonian, so the rocks were of varying ages, overlying Silurian "reef buildups". On the conodonts that had "remarkable similarity" to those from other areas, Gupta stated that this had been noted "independently as far back as 1967", and that the Devonian conodont fauna was "fairly widespread in the Himalayas and is being worked out in detail on the basis of fresh collections from measured sections." Gupta apologised for acknowledging the American paleontologist W. C. Sweet in his "paper on the Tandi Limestone." He accepted that "Mistakes were certainly made over the record of different types of fossils from the Krol and Tal formations."

=== Involved geologists ===
In the Science report, Webster agreed that he had already had the information on the similarity between the Himalayan fossils and those in America and Europe, especially the crinoids which had only been found in the United States. Commenting on Talent's Calgary speech, he conceded: "I am now virtually certain that most of these specimens did come from places other than the Himalayas. I certainly should have been more wary." Janvier stated that he had asked Gupta to make a site expedition himself to where the fossils were collected, to which Gupta replied that it was not possible for political reasons. In his Nature commentary "Breakdown of trust", he regretted the lack of awareness of scientific frauds, writing: "The Gupta case may just be a 'big noise'."

Erben responded to Lewin's report claiming his innocence in Science, while agreeing that Talent could be right, but blamed him for "zealous exaggerations" as Talent trusted a Paris shopkeeper rather than him. While avowing that he and Gupta were qualified scientists, he disparaged Talent as "without qualifications", but stated: "However, while really cogent evidence is, indeed, lacking, the circumstantial evidence assembled by Talent seems to be rather convincing." Talent replied, blaming Erben for ignoring or not being aware of a series of fossils Gupta had produced, and for trying to downplay the fraud allegations. He mentioned that the Moroccan-type ammonoids were available in large quantities not only in Paris, but also in Sydney, Australia, which Erben could have investigated.

A. K. Prasad, then director of Gupta's department at Panjab University, dismissed Talent's accusation as "a conspiracy to denigrate a top Indian scientist". Ahluwalia stated that the fossils were recycled and that the localities for them did not appear to exist, commenting that "most of the doubts expressed by Talent are well-founded" and that it was a "great embarrassment" that made him want to retract the published reports which he and Budurov had co-authored. Dismayed by Gupta's manipulation of data and fabrication of specimens in a report he co-authored about the discovery of a conodont, Neogondollela regale, Bassi considered withdrawing the paper. The editor of Nature found Gupta's commentary unimpressive, stating that "close readings of the accusations and responses leaves the impression that Gupta's defence is flimsy."

The only collaborator to stand up for Gupta was Waterhouse. Calling Talent's accusation "A case of exaggeration", Waterhouse stated that Gupta's specimens were definitely collected from the Himalayas. He asserted that the Himalayan research was reported with accurate locations, as he had verified the fossils and explored the fossil sites himself. Waterhouse wrote that Talent had not examined the actual fossils first-hand, and that Ahluwalia had described some of the reports incorrectly. He wrote that some of Gupta's work in the laboratory and the field might have been sloppy but not deliberately fraudulent. Waterhouse agreed however that the accounts of Himalayan stratigraphy) were "often too coarse and too rushed." Commenting in Nature, he wrote: "The 'case' against Gupta is remarkably rich in bold metaphors and unproven assertions, and somewhat thin in scientific analysis."

=== Academic authorities ===
Panjab University issued a circular in 1990, saying it was "interested not in brushing the controversy under the carpet, but arriving at the truth." It sought help from major authorities including the University Grants Commission, Indian Council of Medical Research, Indian National Science Academy, Council of Scientific and Industrial Research, Wadia Institute of Himalayan Geology, Department of Science and Technology, and Geological Survey of India. Then in March that year, the university took a controversial decision by instituting a scientific expedition team, to be led by Gupta. The Geological Society of India was disappointed by the proposal, commenting: "We fail to understand why Gupta should have been asked to lead the expedition. Besides, it is beyond our comprehension as to how allegations of recycling can be proved or disproved in the field."

The Society for Scientific Values and the Geological Society of India independently investigated the case and submitted their reports to Panjab University in December 1990. In February 1991, the university accepted the allegations and Gupta was temporarily suspended from service in February 1991. The report of the Society for Scientific Values was kept confidential. (Note: Jayaraman mistook Geological Survey of India for Geological Society of India.) The Indian National Science Academy also conducted an independent investigation but failed to come up with coherent findings.

=== Geological Society of India ===
The Geological Society of India, which claimed to normally avoid publishing controversial matters in their academic journal, feared failure to publish Talent's accusations "could be construed as aquiescence in the alleged fraud", and published two articles from Talent criticizing Gupta's research. In the first paper, published in June 1989, Talent's team gave an elaboration of instances of plagiarism in Gupta's reports. The other, published in December 1989, presented further cases of fossil recycling and mismatching of the fossil sources.

As Ian Anderson reported in New Scientist, the Geological Society of India made a "controversial move" by issuing an expression of concern, stating that "the fossil finds of V. J. Gupta are not reliable", but did not formally retract Gupta's papers. The society reassessed Gupta's papers and found "several discrepancies lending support to the accusations" in 19 publications. The society's scientists visited seven localities in the Himalayas where Gupta claimed to have collected Devonian fossils, but found no such evidence, declaring "the falsification of facts attempted by Gupta." They requested Gupta provide them access to his collection of specimens, research notes and laboratory register, but never received a response. The report titled "The Himalayan Fossil Controversy" was issued on 1 January 1991, condemning Gupta's research as "fictitious and based on spurious fossils" and "incomplete bordering on disinformation". It ran the following pronouncements:

- "The most glaring deficiency noticed in nearly all the papers is the absence of precise locality information. Subsequent field checks by officers of the Geological Survey of India and some of Gupta's own colleagues have failed to reveal not only the fossils, but also rock formations stated to have been present in the area... He [Gupta] has failed to produce the originals of the recycled fossils with their registration number, date of collection, field description as entered in Field Note Books and Laboratory Registers and such other evidences which could confirm the genuineness of his fossil collections."
- "It is obvious from the volume of evidence that has now been collected that the fossil finds of V. J. Gupta. are not reliable, that there are internal inconsistencies, that the data is incomplete bordering on disinformation."
- "The Society has no other alternative but to publish the evaluation report with the recommendation that the incomplete and doubtful fossil records as published in the Journal and listed in the enclosed report be ignored till such time that independent proof is forthcoming of the in situ existence of the fossils". [emphasis in original]

== Consequences ==
The Panjab University Vice Chancellor Ram Prakash Bambah issued Gupta's suspension order in February 1991. As Triloki Nath Kapoor soon replaced Bambah, Gupta was reinstated in January 1992. That year, the University Grants Commission of India stopped its funding to Gupta, and Nature reported a note of disappointment over Gupta's reinstallation, calling it an "Indian rope trick". The resurgent controversy compelled Kapoor for a proper action. The affair was investigated in an official inquiry led by Man Mohan Singh Gujral, the retired Chief Justice of the Sikkim High Court. The inquiry started in February 1992 and lasted two years with the final report submitted in April 1994. Gupta did not provide specific evidence that rebutted the suggestions, instead claiming that he did not have a good memory of his field research and never kept field notes. The verdict found Gupta guilty of all charges including data recycling, plagiarism, concocting research locations and conning other scientists. Panjab University imposed three penalties on Gupta: (1) he was officially reprimanded; (2) he was debarred from administrative positions, his becoming a dean which was due that year was stayed; and (3) his annual increments of salary were ceased. In 1993, the UGC had rescinded Gupta's department from the status of the Centre of Advanced Study in Palaeontology and Himalayan Geology.

Gupta's dismissal from Panjab University was discussed by the Syndicate meeting on 30 June 1994, but no decision was made and the case was deferred to the Senate. The Senate meeting on 24 September made a majority decision, 50 out of 55, that Gupta was not to be discharged; only five were in favour of a dismissal. Gupta was however restricted from teaching palaeontology, and was assigned a course in environmental and ground water geology. He was allowed to continue supervising research students. Pressured by the academic community and public outcries, the university once again brought back Gupta's expulsion case in 1996. When Gupta knew his case was coming up in a special meeting of the Senate to be held on 17 March, he submitted a letter of resignation for voluntary retirement on 1 March. He requested cancellation of the Senate meeting. However, K. R. Narayanan, then Vice President of India and ex-officio Chancellor of the university, pushed on for the Senate meeting to uphold the integrity of the university. Learning of this insistence, Gupta submitted an application for reversal of his resignation three days before the meeting and went to the Punjab and Haryana High Court seeking protection from the outcomes of the Senate meeting. The court made a notification to the university not to exercise further retribution on Gupta. Having no other option, the Senate decided to accept the resignation letter upon which Gupta took it to the court as he had already revoked that resignation. Gupta won the court case and continued his academic duties.

Gupta was still defiant about his research and called the whole ordeal a "conspiracy by foreigners." He wrote seven books on environmental geology. Receiving a full pension benefit, he retired (some sources saying a premature superannuation) in 2002. (Note: Sources, even from Talent, indicate the claimed retirement in 2004 may not be reliable, and obviously not an "early" retirement.) Dhiraj Mohan Banerjee of the Geological Survey of India condemned what in his opinion was the university's ineptness on Gupta' continued service and superannuation saying that it "reflects the utter poverty of the Indian ethics."

Talent stated that Gupta had made death threats, saying in an ABC News interview when asked if he was a hero: "Oh, I don't know about a hero. There were no particularly dire consequences, just a few death threats. The people who were hurt most were in India." One day, a Panjab University technical assistant who had been involved in preparing fossil photographs for Gupta announced that he had evidence of the sources of fossil frauds and was planning to reveal them. He was killed in a hit and run accident the following night in front of his residence. Gupta allegedly offered money to people to physically assault the co-authors of the Courier paper, Goel and Kumar. A few days later, the mother of one of the co-authors [not specified] was reportedly the victim of a hit and run accident, resulting in both legs and arms and several ribs broken.

== Impact ==
Gupta's forgery has often been compared with the 1912 case of Piltdown Man, sometimes called the greatest hoax in science. Nature announced Talent's observations with a statement that it "will cast a longer shadow" than Piltdown Man because of its elaborate publications involving numerous discoveries through a quarter of a century, and multiple fossils and scientists. The Chicago Tribune described it as "the most serious case of its kind since the Piltdown hoax." The New York Times wrote: "Unlike the case of Piltdown man, in which a single skull was passed off as a fossil of a prehistoric human, this one involves a much broader range of reported finds that have become a part of scientific literature." Given the scale of fossils and the research publications, Talent described it as "[perhaps] the biggest paleontological fraud of all time." In 1994, Down to Earth reported it as the "greatest scientific fraud of the century". According to Tony Mayer of the Nanyang Technological University, Singapore, the saga "is possibly one of the most extensive instances of malpractice in the whole scientific record."

Gupta never faced charges of criminality or immorality from either the university or government authorities. The scientist Pushpa Mittra Bhargava explained his resignation from India's largest scientific establishments including Indian National Science Academy, National Academy of Sciences, Indian Academy of Sciences, and Indian Social Science Academy with reference to Gupta's case: "Charges of fraudulent claims laid by him [Gupta] on the discovery of Himalayan fossils have been proved, but the only punishment he has been awarded is the stoppage of some of his increments. What is worse is that the person who exposed him is now being harassed and victimised instead of being made a hero."

Gujral's inquiry reported that none of Gupta's co-authors were associated with the misconduct. A colleague and co-author of Gupta, Ahluwalia who had openly supported Talent's allegations and blamed Gupta of misconduct into which he was linked, was reprimanded and punished by the Panjab University. The Geological Society of India's secretary Sampige Venkateshaiya Srikantia made a press statement criticising the Panjab University's decision in 1994 as "a mild censure which amounts to a blatant disregard of ethical values... [and] chosen to ignore all the scientific and legal opinions... [referring to Ahluwalia's case] no one with conscience will come forward to speak the truth and the scientific community will be anaesthetized." Nature commented on the failure of Panjab University on the case: "Chandigarh's indulgence of Gupta is a kind of rope trick in that it defies the admittedly unwritten laws that usually apply when people are accused of publishing fraudulent data."

=== Vindhyan fossil controversy ===
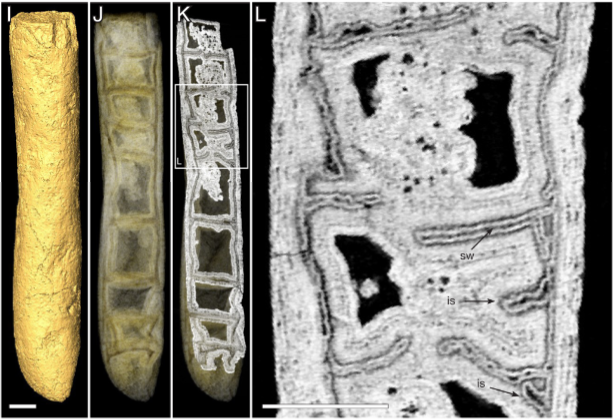
A genuine fossil alga, Rafatazmia chitrakootensis, was doubted for many years in the aftermath of Gupta's fraud.

Gupta's fraud had lingering effects on Indian palaeontology. The discipline "lost prestige" in India and the scandal caused "irreparable damage to Indian science." Indian discoveries not only in geology but also in other science disciplines were viewed with suspicion. India came to be perceived as "a leading nation in fraudulent scientific research."

An example of such prejudice arose with the discovery of one of the oldest multicellular eukaryotes. The fossils were discovered from the Vindhyan Mountains in Central India by Rafat Jamal Azmi, of the Wadia Institute of Himalayan Geology in Dehradun, who reported in the Journal of the Geological Society of India in 1998. As Azmi announced the discovery in Science, it was immediately received with scepticism. When renowned palaeontologists including Nicholas Butterfield, Simon Conway Morris and Soren Jensen examined the samples, they concluded that they were not fossils at all but artefacts. At the behest of the Geological Society of India, a team of palaeontologists from the Geological Survey of India, Wadia Institute of Himalayan Geology and Lucknow University, coordinated by Om Narain Bhargava, conducted an expedition in 1999 to verify the discovery. They stated that they had found no evidence of Azmi's claims. In 2000, based on the report of the expeditionary team, the Journal of the Geological Society of India issued a concluding statement declaring "that the identification of fossils by R. J. Azmi is far from convincing and that more detailed work is necessary before the authenticity of the find is accepted." The dispute persisted until 2009 when Stefan Bengtson and colleagues published a full analysis of the case, recognising Azmi's discovery as genuine. In a further vindication in 2017, Bengston's team established that the fossil, estimated to be 1.6 billion years old, was that of an alga, which they named Rafatazmia chitrakootensis (Figure 4) after the discoverer, becoming the oldest known alga.

=== Policy and popular culture ===
In 1989, the US House of Representatives used the case as one of the evidences of scientific frauds in its first hearing on its policy on "Maintaining the Integrity of Scientific Research".

In 1991, a 52-minute documentary of the hoax was presented by Robyn Williams in an ABC TV programme The Professor's New Clothes.

In 2000, a 24-minute podcast documentary was broadcast on 31 March by BBC in its programme "Science Friction" with the headline "Tampering with the Fossil Record".

In 2013, S.K. Shah of the Palaeontological Society of India published a book Himalayan Fossil Fraud: A View from the Galleries.

In 2021, the University Grants Commission of India used the affair as a case study in its policy titled Academic Integrity and Research Quality.
