= Scientific plagiarism in India =

A lack of oversight and a lack of proper training for scientists have led to the rise of plagiarism and research misconduct in India. India does not have a statutory body to deal with scientific misconduct in academia, like the Office of Research Integrity in the US, and hence cases of plagiarism are often dealt in ad-hoc fashion with different routes being followed in different cases. In most cases, a public and media outcry leads to an investigation either by institutional authorities or by independent enquiry committees. Plagiarists have in some cases been suspended, removed or demoted. However, no fixed route has been prescribed to monitor such activities. This has led to calls for establishment of an independent ethics body.

== Society for Scientific Values ==
The Society for Scientific Values is an independent body of scientists with the goal of upholding ethics in the Indian Scientific community. In absence of a statutory body to investigate academic misconduct, the society has been acting as an independent watchdog over the years. The society has been active in recently over several past cases involving plagiarism. K. L. Chopra, ex-director of Indian Institute of Technology, Kharagpur is currently the president of the society while N. Raghuram of Guru Gobind Singh Indraprastha University is the secretary.

== Indian Research Watch ==
The Indian Research Watch (IRW) is a volunteer‑run, non‑profit academic oversight group founded in 2022 by data scientist Achal Agrawal. IRW’s stated mission is to expose and deter research misconduct such as plagiarism, duplicate publication, data fabrication and image manipulation by Indian authors through anonymous tip‑lines, database analysis, and public reporting on platforms like PubPeer and social media.

IRW maintains an online portal where whistleblowers can submit allegations anonymously; a team of volunteer researchers then verifies and, where warranted, publicly flags confirmed cases to pressure journals and institutions into action. While IRW has no formal regulatory power, its findings have prompted media coverage and renewed calls for stronger oversight of research integrity in India.

== Plagiarism in Indian Institutes of Technology ==
Between 2006 and 2023, a study by the Indian Research Watch (IRW), drawing on data from the Retraction Watch database, found that 58 papers authored or co‑authored by faculty across 12 of the 23 IITs were retracted for plagiarism or duplicate publication. In the same period, leading global universities reported far fewer retractions (Stanford 3, Princeton 2, Oxford 5, Cambridge 5, Tsinghua 10), highlighting a disproportionate rise in India’s premier engineering institutes.

=== Extent of Retractions ===
IRW’s analysis showed that retractions from Indian institutions surged by 2.5‑fold in 2020–2022 compared to 2017–2019, reflecting both increased detection and possible growth in misconduct.

=== Notable Cases ===
- IIT Kharagpur (2010): Prof. R. N. P. Choudhary, then Head of the Physics Department, was removed from his post after a junior colleague accused him of misappropriating credit and text from her work.
- IIT Kanpur (2010): Two review articles in Biotechnology Advances by Prof. Ashok Kumar (Dept. of Biological Sciences & Bioengineering) and co‑authors were retracted for wholesale copying from earlier papers and Wikipedia; an internal IIT‑K inquiry later recommended major penalties against the professor and several students.
- IIT Delhi & Others (2009): A joint paper by professors from IIT Delhi, Jamia Millia Islamia and IUAC was retracted by Nuclear Instruments and Methods in Physics Research for plagiarizing large portions of an earlier publication.

These high‑profile cases prompted the Society for Scientific Values (SSV) to reprimand several IITs in 2010 for lax handling of plagiarism allegations and urged stricter enforcement of academic integrity policies.

== Plagiarism in IIMs ==
=== IIM Ahmedabad ===
On 17 August 1992, a student complained to the Director IIM stating that "While doing my summer project, I had to do some modelling and data analysis. I had carried my copies of Levin (Statistics for Management), and Baumol (Economic Theory and Operations Analysis) along from the organisation I was in, I borrowed copies of Wagner (Principles of Operations Research) and Quantitative Techniques for Managerial Decisions by U. K. Srivastava (a CMA Prof. at IIMA), G. V. Shenoy, and S. C. Sharma. As I was browsing through the books, I came across a most interesting thing. At several places, the Srivastava, Shenoy, Sharma book had simply lifted stuff from the other three books (Baumol, Levin, and Wagner) and no references anywhere in the book". Upon enquiry a Committee, based on a report by a student, found that the book Quantitative Techniques for Managerial Decisions by U. K. Srivastava, G. V. Shenoy, and S. C. Sharma had copied without acknowledgment of the source at least at 10 different places including 5 foreign books and some other Indian books, such as Baumol, Levin and Wagner (all books were published prior to the publication of the book).

=== IIM Indore ===
On 3 March 2012, the director of IIM Indore, N. Ravichandran, has been asked by the centre to respond to an accusation of plagiarism against him and another senior faculty member of the institute, Omkar D. Palsule-Desai. They had submitted a paper—The management case on "Euthanasia: Should it be Lawful or Otherwise?". Ahmedabad-based researcher K.R. Narendrababu has complained that the paper was sourced heavily from a Supreme Court judgment without adequate attribution. One month later, on 12 April, veteran industrialist Mr LN Jhunjhunwala, who is also the chairman of the Indian Institute of Management (IIM), Indore's board of governors resigned citing major differences with Dr N Ravichandran. Another board member and Bhopal-based retired IAS officer Dr MN Buch also resigned.

== Other instances of plagiarism ==
=== Prof. B.S. Rajput controversy ===
The most high-profile and widely publicized controversy in India has been that of Prof. B. S. Rajput and colleagues in the field of Theoretical Physics.

Prof. B.S. Rajput was the vice-chancellor of Kumaon University, India in 2002 when various physicists in India started a website alleging that some of his papers claimed authorship of work, reported earlier by other researchers. The principal allegation was that a paper published by S.C. Joshi and B.S. Rajput entitled "Axion-dilaton black holes with SL(2,Z) symmetry through APT-FGP model" in Europhysics Letters, Vol. 57, No. 5, was entirely copied from a six-year-old paper by Renata Kallosh of Stanford in Physical Review D, Vol 54, No. 8. However, the campaign very soon included three other papers by Prof. Rajput and colleagues as plagiarised papers. One of these papers "BPS Spectra of Dyons in Four-Dimensional N = 2 Supersymmetric Theories" was later recalled by the journal Progress of Theoretical Physics.

On publication of the site, Prof. Rajput threatened to take legal action against the website, maintaining that the paper was written by Mr. Joshi, one of his students, without prior approval from him. However, the site was endorsed by over 40 Indian physicists. In addition, seven physicists including Nobel Laureate, S. Chu, R. Laughlin and D. Osheroff wrote to the president of India, APJ Abdul Kalam requesting an investigation in this matter. The situation became murkier when Prof Kavita Pandey, head of the Physics department at Kumaon University claimed that she was suspended by the university as she brought this issue to the public.

In midst of all this blame game, the president of India asked the Governor of Uttaranchal who was also the chancellor of the Kumaon University to institute an enquiry to investigate the case. The committee led by a retired judge of Allahabad high court Justice S.R. Singh consisted of Prof K.B. Powar, former chief of the Association of Indian Universities, New Delhi, Prof Indira Nath, former secretary of the Society of Scientific Values and AIIMS faculty member and physicist Prof R. Rajaraman of JNU. The committee presented its report in February 2003 upholding the plagiarism charges. Prof. Rajput maintained that he has personally done no harm and it was his student's fault. However, he resigned from Vice-chancellorship immediately after the report.

=== Sangiliyandi Gurunathan controversy ===
Sangiliyandi Gurunathan, a professor from Kalasalingam University in India, has been found to be involved in plagiarism.

=== Gopal Kundu controversy ===
A controversy erupted in National Centre for Cell Science (NCCS), Pune in 2006 when an anonymous mail alleged that the authors (H. Rangaswami and Colleagues from the group of Dr. Gopal Kundu) may have misrepresented data (especially through Western blots) in a paper published in Journal of Biological Chemistry. The allegation was that they had rehashed the same set of data which they had published earlier. An internal committee of the NCCS advised the authors to take back their paper, however an independent committee led by G. Padmanabhan, a former director of Indian Institute of Science, Bangalore, concluded that there was no manipulation in the data. This led to some heated debate between Indian Scientists with several viewpoints being presented. On 23 February 2007, the Journal of Biological Chemistry withdrew the paper amid allegations of data manipulation. The authors still maintain that the two papers used different set of data though similar experiments. In November 2010, after an internal investigation by its ethics committee, the Indian Academy of Sciences banned Gopal Kundu from participating in their activities for three years.

=== Prof. P. Chiranjeevi controversy ===
Chemistry professor of Sri Venkateswara University (SVU) is accused of plagiarising more than 70 research papers published between 2004 and 2007. University Executive Council has banned him from undertaking examination work and research guidance. He has been debarred from securing further promotions and appointments to administrative positions.

=== Dr. Ram B. Singh controversy ===
A private practitioner based in Moradabad, Uttar Pradesh, India is suspected of research fraud.

=== Prof. K. Kumar controversy ===
In yet another high-profile case involving a Director of an Indian technical institute, a web campaign, similar to the campaign started by physicists in India, reported plagiarism in papers published by Prof. Kalyan Kumar and colleagues at North Eastern Regional Institute of Science and Technology, NERIST, India. Three papers have been reported to have similarity to works reported earlier. Two of these, "Improved PID controller using fuzzy precompensated algorithm for PMBLDC motor drive" (AMSE Advances in Modelling and Analysis C, Volume 61, number 1-2, January 2006, Page (s) 1–15) and "Optimum PI controller for Permanent Magnet Brushless DC Motor" (Electrical Review, Volume 12, No 6, June 2005, Pages 16 –23) have been shown to be very similar to earlier papers by Bhim Singh, AHN Reddy and SS Murthy of Indian Institute of Technology, Delhi. The papers of Singh, Reddy and Murthy, viz "Hybrid fuzzy logic proportional plus conventional integral-derivative controller for permanent magnet brushless DC motor" (IEEE International Conference on Industrial Technology 2000, Volume 2, 19–22 January 2000, pp. 185–191) and "Gain Scheduling Control of Permanent Magnet Brushless dc Motor" (Journal of Institution of Engineers : India EL, Vol 84, September 2003 ) predate the papers of Kumar and Singh by five years.

In yet another controversy, the same group of authors have claimed to publish a paper entitled, "Sensorless control of permanent magnet brushless dc motors" in Electrical Review (Volume 14, No 1, January 2007, Pages 10–14), which has been reported to have high similarity to a thirteen-year-old paper entitled "Sensorless control of permanent magnet AC motors" by K. Rajshekara and A. Kawamura from EPS Anderson and Yokohama University, published in Proceedings of the 20th International Conference on Industrial Electronics, Control and Instrumentation, 1994. IECON'94, Bologna, Italy, Volume 3, September 1994, Page(s): 1589 – 1594.

=== K. Muthukumar controversy ===
Another controversy occurred in 2007, this time surrounding authors from Anna University and Indira Gandhi Centre for Atomic Research (IGCAR) publishing an article in the Journal of Materials Science. The article written by K. Muthukumar, T. Mathews, S. Selladurai and R. Bokalawela was reported to be a reproduction of an article published earlier in Proceedings of the National Academy of Sciences (PNAS) by David Andersson and others at the Royal Institute of Technology, Sweden. In a correction published online, the journal reported that the article 'does not just plagiarise the results presented in the PNAS paper but actually copies most of it word for word'. The journal had started an investigation and is also working with officials at the two institutions. The three authors other than the first author have distanced themselves from the paper and the first author has accepted his mistake.

=== Prof Balakrishnan and Prof Ashok Pandey controversy ===
Ashok Pandey is a scientist of the National Institute for Interdisciplinary Science and Technology of India's Council of Scientific and Industrial Research (CSIR). He is the editor of several well known international journals in Biotechnology. He appears in the list of most cited authors and received the Thomson Scientific Citation Laureate Award 2006. His paper cited as K. Balakrishnan and A. Pandey (1996) Influence of amino acids on the synthesis of cyclosporin A by Tolypocladium inflatum. Appl Microbiol Biotechnol 45: 800–803 which was published as an original article in July 1996, was an extensively plagiarised version of J. Lee and S.N. Agathos (1989) Effect of amino acids on the production of cyclosporin A by Tolypocladium inflatum. Biotechnol Lett 11:77–82. This was pointed out by Agathos in his letter to the Editor of the journal. The Editor-in-Chief of the journal, Alexander Steinbüchel, confronted Ashok Pandey with the evidence and decided that "manuscripts from K. Balakrishnan and A. Pandey will no longer be considered for publication in this journal, and the Editors-in-Chief of other journals covering aspects of microbiology and /or biotechnology will be informed about this matter".

=== Prof M.R. Adhikari and L.K. Pramanik controversy ===
A retired academic at Calcutta University, Mahimaranjan Adhikari and his PhD student L.K. Pramanik, have been found to be indulging in Plagiarism, courtesy the American Mathematical Society. AMS has cautioned universities worldwide regarding this incidence. The papers reported to be plagiarised are 'The connectivity of squares of box graphs', 'On edge-connectivity of inserted graphs' and 'Factors of inserted graphs'. The reviews may be found in MathSciNet. The original work was carried out by T Zamfirescu's in the 1970s. An investigation by Calcutta university found these to be true and the university is planning action against the concerned. Prof. M.R. Adhikari for his part has shifted the entire blame on the research scholar Lakshmikanto Pramanik who had "used his name without consent". A reply to the editor of the South East Asian Bulletin of Mathematics (MR2400443) confirms this.

=== Scientific misconduct and plagiarism by IITs ===
By the end of the year 2010, three Indian Institutes of Technology, the most prestigious and elite institutes of the nation, have also become controversial due to alleged scientific misconduct and unethical practices. IIT Kharagpur physics professor R.N.P. Choudhary has lost his position as head of department after a junior faculty member Dr. A.K. Thakur accused him of not sharing research credit with him. IIT Delhi was also in news for retraction notice by the Nuclear Instruments and Methods in Physics Research Section B: Beam Interactions with Materials and Atoms in its January 2010 issue, blaming Dr. Anup K Ghosh – a faculty of IIT Delhi, along with others, for being allegedly involved in plagiarism. Nearly a year later, this time Prof. Ashok Kumar of Bioscience and Bioengineering school of IIT Kanpur has been accused with plagiarism charges by the journal Biotechnology Advances and subsequently retracted two of his articles.

=== Dr. Sanjeeb Kumar Sahoo controversy ===
Dr. S.K. Sahoo is a scientist in the field of nanotechnology (cancer drug delivery) at the Institute of Life Sciences (an autonomous institute of the Department of Biotechnology, Govt. of India) located in Bhubaneswar, India. There have been serious concerns related to the accuracy of the data presented in many articles published by him. According to a notice published in the June 2013 issue of the journal Acta Biomaterialia, five research articles published by Dr. S.K. Sahoo have been retracted following highly unethical practices such as serial self plagiarism, data manipulation and falsification of results.

=== Other ===
- In a notice by the journal Biotechnology Advances in its Nov/Dec 2010 issue, an article published by Dr. Sangiliyandi Gurunathan and group at Division of Molecular and Cellular Biology, Kalasalingam University has been retracted due to plagiarism.
- There was a minor plagiarism controversy in 2012, when a PhD student plagiarised some content in a paper that happened to be co-authored by C. N. R. Rao – science adviser to India's Prime Minister.

== See also ==
- Plagiarism
- Research Integrity Risk Index
- Plagiarism detection
- Scientific plagiarism in the United States
- Vishwa Jit Gupta and the Himalayan fossil hoax
