= Vishwa Jit Gupta =

Indian paleontologist accused of scientific fraud

- Born: 4 November 1942; Chandigarh, India
- Died: 31 December 2022 (aged 80)
- Education: Panjab University
- Known for: Himalayan fossil hoax
- Scientific career
- Fields: Geology; Paleontology
- Workplaces: Panjab University
- Thesis: Palaeontology, Stratigraphy and Structure of the Palaeozoic Rocks of the Area South-East of Srinagar (1966)
- Doctoral advisor: M.R. Sahni

Vishwa Jit Gupta, alternatively spelt Viswa Jit Gupta, or Vishwajit Gupta, (1942—2022) was an Indian paleontologist and former professor of geology at Panjab University, Chandigarh. He was initially recognised for his research on the geological settings and fossil records of the Himalayas, publishing five books and 458 articles on the subject between 1966 and 1989. However, many of the fossils he reported were subsequently exposed as fake or manipulated, making him infamous for large-scale scientific fraud known as the Himalayan fossil hoax. Once recognised as "India's most celebrated fossil scientist", he was later named as "the greatest" and "most notorious paleontological fraudster", earning the moniker "Houdini of the Himalayas".

== Biography ==
Gupta received a Master of Science in the Department of Geology (at the time the Centre of Advanced Study in Palaeontology and Himalayan Geology) at Panjab University, Chandigarh. After enrolling in a doctoral programme under the supervision of Mulk Raj Sahni, he investigated fossils from the Himalayan region in Kashmir. In 1964, he and Sahni published the first reports of fossils, including the discovery of graptolites in two papers in Nature, reports of fossil assemblages in two papers in Current Science, and another paper in the Journal of the Palaeontological Society of India. In 1966, Panjab University awarded him a Ph.D. for his thesis Palaeontology, Stratigraphy and Structure of the Palaeozoic Rocks of the Area South-East of Srinagar. He subsequently joined the university's geology faculty and supervised his first doctoral scholar, Inder Jeet, who completed his Ph.D. in 1972. Later in the same year, Panjab University awarded him a Doctor of Science in recognition of his research and established a separate position for him as Director of the Institute of Paleontology.

Gupta collaborated with 128 eminent scientists around the world, including William B. N. Berry, Director of the University of California, Berkeley's Museum of Paleontology, Gerhard R. Fuchs of the Geological Survey of Austria, Philippe Janvier of the Museum of Natural History at Paris, John Bruce Waterhouse of the University of Queensland, Frank H. T. Rhodes from the University College of Swansea (later president of Cornell University), Michael E. Brookfield of the University of Guelph in Ontario, Makoto Kato of Hokkaido University, Andrzej Gaździcki of the Polish Academy of Sciences, Heinrich Karl Erben of the Institut für Paläontologie in Bonn, and K. J. Budurov of the Bulgarian Academy of Sciences. Gary Webster at the Washington State University coauthored nine of Gupta's papers. In 1973, Gupta and Susan Turner of the University of Newcastle upon Tyne reported the discovery of what was then considered the oldest fish fossil found in India, dating to the Devonian period. By 1989, he had published 458 research articles and five books on Himalayan geology, although many of his reported fossil discoveries were later discredited as part of the Himalayan fossil hoax.

In 1989, Gupta was exposed for research fraud by Australian geologist John Alfred Talent of Macquarie University. In December 1990, the Panjab University received evidence from the Geological Society of India and the Society for Scientific Values documenting Gupta's extensive research misconduct. At the time, Gupta was professor of geology and director of the university's Institute of Paleontology. Vice-Chancellor Ram Prakash Bambah suspended him in February 1991, but his successor, T.N. Kapoor, reinstated him in January 1992. The University Grants Commission of India subsequently revoked its financial support to Gupta's research. In 1994, a legal inquest conducted by M. S. Gujral, a retired judge of the Sikkim High Court, found Gupta guilty of research misconduct. However, the university senate allowed to continue in service. However, the university blocked his appointment as dean that year. Gupta was permitted to retire in 2002 upon reaching the age of superannuation, with his retirement benefits intact. After retirement, Gupta focussed on environmental issues and authored seven books on the subject.

== Research misconduct ==
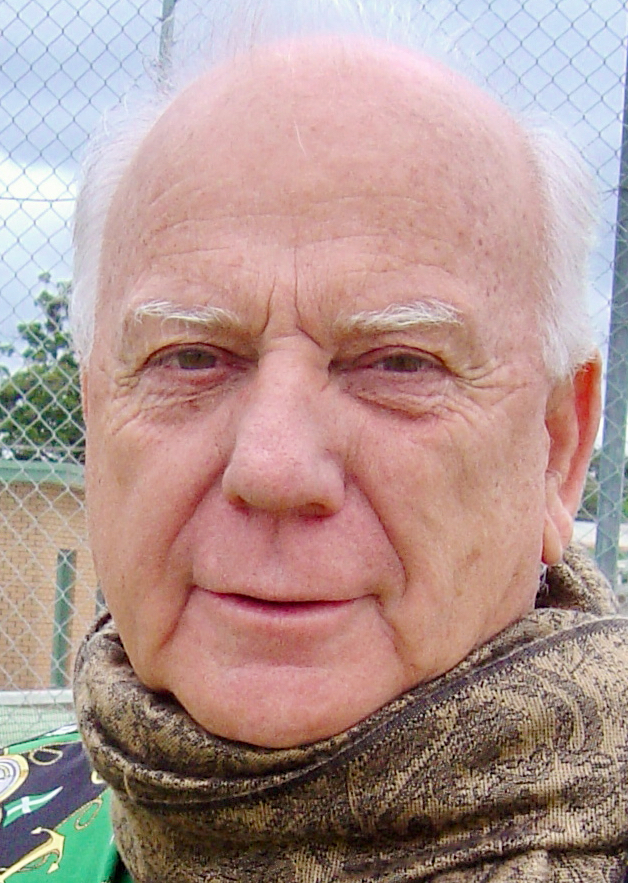
John Alfred Talent, who exposed Gupta's fraud

Gupta's publishing record, comprising more than 400 research papers purportedly based on work conducted over two decades, came under scrutiny after Australian geologist John Talent spent nearly nine years investigating his claims and publications to establish a case of scientific fraud. Suspicions of fraud arose when Talent and John Pickett visited a road-cutting site in Nepal where Gupta had reported finding large numbers of Devonian conodont fossils. They found no fossils at almost all of the 20 sites identified by Gupta, although one site yielded a fossil dating to the Silurian period. They subsequently discovered that Gupta had used the same image in two papers. Though they initially considered the possibility that that the duplication might have resulted from an editorial error, a more detailed examination showed that Gupta had used illustrations of fossils similar to specimens collected near New York by George Jennings Hinde in 1879. Talent and Pickett interviewed questioned Gupta on several occasions and spoke to several of the co-authors of his scientific papers. After nearly nine years of investigation, they assembled enough evidence and made a detailed case accusing him of wilful and large-scale scientific fraud.

Gupta responded to the allegations with arguments from authority and pointing to the credentials of his co-workers. The case unravelled as several co-authors realised that they had been misled by Gupta after having trusted Gupta's work in good faith. They had overlooked apparent contradictions and implausible results, particularly the assumption that Gupta had collected the fossils at the locations he claimed they had been found. Further investigation also revealed other forms of scientific misconduct, including the reuse of specimens attributed to different locations, the use of a specimen reported missing from another collection, and the plagiarism of fossil images.

John Talent reportedly received death threats from Gupta. In an interview with ABC News, Talent stated that a technician in Gupta's department who had threatened to expose details of the fraud was reportedly killed in a hit-and-run accident. Talent also alleged that Gupta had offered money to hitmen to injure his enemies. In another incident, the elderly mother of an Indian co-author of a report by Talent published by the Senckenberg Museum was seriously injured in a road accident.
