= George Hinde =

George Hinde may refer to:

- George Jennings Hinde (1839–1918), British paleontologist
- George Hinde (Owenite), a chairman of the Owenite community in Spa Fields
