= Amitabha Ghosh (academic, born 1941) =

Indian educator and researcher

Director at Indian Institute of Technology Kharagpur
- In office 1997–2002
- Preceded by: K. L. Chopra
- Succeeded by: Shishir Dube

Professor at Indian Institute of Technology Kanpur

Personal details
- Born: 1941 (age 84–85)
- Education: University of Calcutta; IIEST, Shibpur
- Profession: Professor

Amitabha Ghosh is an Indian researcher, administrator and educator. He currently holds the position of Emeritus Scientist of Indian National Science Academy, New Delhi. He was previously Honorary Distinguished Professor in the Aerospace Engineering and Applied Mechanics Department at the Indian Institute of Engineering Science and Technology, Shibpur, Howrah, West Bengal. He is an emeritus Senior Fellow of the Alexander von Humboldt Foundation and a Fellow of The National Academy of Sciences, India, of which he was elected a Senior Scientist Platinum Jubilee Fellow in 2012. Ghosh has made contributions in various fields, including fundamental and applied research, technology development, administration and social development.

== Early life and education ==
Amitabha Ghosh was born on December 3, 1941, in the village of Barhra in the Birbhum district near the Jharkhand border. After completing his preparatory education at the Barhra High School, he matriculated at Suri Vidyasagar College in 1956, and received his Intermediate Science degree from University of Calcutta in 1958. He then enrolled in Bengal Engineering College, Shibpur, now known as the Indian Institute of Engineering Science and Technology (IIEST) Shibpur, earning bachelor's (1962) and master's (1964) degrees in mechanical engineering from University of Calcutta. He received three University of Calcutta Gold Medals for posting the highest grades in his BE and ME examinations. He subsequently joined the college faculty as a lecturer in mechanical engineering in May 1965 and continued his doctoral research, receiving the D Phil degree from University of Calcutta in 1969. His research at the college resulted in the discovery of a new tribological effect when magnetic fields are imposed on ferromagnetic bodies.

== Academic career ==
In 1971 he joined IIT Kanpur as an assistant professor of mechanical engineering and became a professor in 1975. He taught courses in manufacturing science, design and dynamics, and robotics, and his lab developed techniques for improving the life of cutting tools, detected chaos in mechanical systems for the first time (in 1978) and laid the groundwork for the development of micro-welding and micro-fused deposition welding. Fundamental research led to applications in manufacturing operations, as well as practical devices such as improved brakes and traction for rickshaws, lens polishing machines, electrochemical discharge machines and large transmission ratio drives with high power transmission capacity. The first Centre for Robotics at IIT Kanpur was opened in 1986 supported by a grant from the Ministry of Human Resource Development, Government of India. It was renamed the centre for Mechatronics in 1989. Ghosh was the centre's founding Head from 1986 to 1989 as well as the Head of the Engineering Department.

Ghosh was appointed to the position of Director of IIT Kharagpur in 1997 for a five-year term. During his tenure as director, three new research centres were inaugurated, namely the Centre for Theoretical Studies, the Advanced Technology Centre and the Space Technology Centre (later renamed the Kalpana Chawla Space Technology Cell); while a separate biotechnology department was established to administer undergraduate biotechnology courses. He also oversaw the establishment of the School of Medical Science and Technology in order to offer post graduate education to MBBS doctors and conduct medical research, bringing medical sciences into the IIT system for the first time in India, and presided over the creation of the Very Large Scale Integration Lab at IIT Kharagpur.

Since 2005, he has regularly organized specialized short courses on physics and astronomy for senior school students drawing on funds from science academies, the Indian Department of Science and Technology's INSPIRE program and from IUCAA Pune. He was course director of the Science Education Program on Foundations of Physics held at the Central Mechanical Engineering Research Institute, Durgapur in 2005. and is the founding president of the South Howrah Citizens’ Forum, which organizes science education programs for students and technical training programs for school dropouts.

== International collaborations ==
Amitabha Ghosh has contributed to several international collaborations. From 1998 to 2006 he was the Indian Coordinator of the Indo-Japan Science Collaboration Programme in Engineering administered by the Department of Science and Technology (DST, Government of India) and the Japan Society for Promotion of Science (JSPS, Government of Japan). He was also the Indian Coordinator of the Indo-US Joint Centre for Research Excellence in Futuristic Manufacturing & Fabrionics funded by the DST and NSF through the Indo-US Science and Technology Forum, from 2006 to 2013. The collaboration brings together five participating institutions each from India and the United States. The term "fabrionics" was coined by Amitabha Ghosh.

== Professional distinctions ==
He has been a member of numerous academic, research and executive councils, and has been the recipient of several government appointments. From January 2001 to July 2013 he served as Chairman of the Research Council of the Central Mechanical Engineering Research Institute, Durgapur, the national laboratory for mechanical engineering in India under the Council of Scientific and Industrial Research (CSIR). From 2000 to 2004 he chaired the Engineering Science Committee of the Council of Scientific and Industrial Research, and from 2002 to 2004, headed the Project Appraisal Committee, Robotics and Manufacturing in the Department of Science and Technology. He also chaired the Engineering Committee for Major Funding to Develop Science and Technology Infrastructure (FIST) in Major Institutions from 2002 to 2008, and served as Chairman of the Governing Body of the National Institute of Technical Teachers' Training and Research, Bhopal from 2009 to 2014. This facility is a national institute within the Ministry of Human Resource Development of the Government of India. He was a co-author of the Anandrakrishnan Report, which recommended upgrading five existing institutions to form the new IIEST system in India.

In the field of research, he and co-researchers are credited with the discovery of the effect of the magnetic field on wear, development of methods to enhance damping through introduced stress concentration, analysis of kinetoelastodynamic problems of high speed compliant mechanisms and the detection of the phenomenon of chaos in mechanical systems.

== Awards and honours ==
- Calcutta University Gold Medal for standing First in the B.E. examination, 1962
- Calcutta University A.H. Pandya Gold Medal for standing First among all branches of engineering of the university in the B.E. examination, 1962
- Calcutta University Gold Medal for standing First in the M.E. examination, 1964
- Mechanical Engineering Design Award, National Design & Research Forum, Institution of Engineers (India), 1998
- Distinguished Teacher Award, IIT. Kanpur 2002
- Engineering Personality Award, 20th Indian Engineering Congress, 2005
- Doctor of Science (honoris causa), Indian Institute of Engineering Science & Technology, Shibpur, 2009
- Prof Jai Krishna Award for Research Excellence, Indian National Academy of Engineering, New Delhi, 2012
- Lifetime Achievement Award, Systems Society of India, 2012
- Distinguished Alumnus Award, Bengal Engineering and Science University, 2014
- Institute Fellow of IIT Kanpur, IIT Kanpur, 2014
- Doctor of Science (honoris causa), National Institute of Technology, Sikkim, 2017

== Fellowships and memberships ==
Amitabha Ghosh is a member of all four academies of science in India, and was elected a Senior Fellow of the Alexander von Humboldt Foundation in 1977, entailing a series of residencies at RWTH Aachen University in Germany from 1977–8 to 2012. His Indian fellowships are as follows:

- Fellow, Institution of Engineers (India)
- Fellow, Indian National Academy of Engineering, New Delhi
- Fellow, Indian Academy of Sciences, Bangalore
- Fellow, Indian National Science Academy, New Delhi
- Fellow, The National Academy of Sciences, India, Allahabad
- Honorary Life Fellow, Association for Machines and Mechanisms

== Scientific publications ==
Amitabha Ghosh has authored and collaborated in numerous journal articles in the fields of mechanical engineering, robotics and dynamics as well as gravitational physics. In his early engineering research, starting with his D Phil thesis at Calcutta University on cutting tool wear, he investigated the effect of magnetic fields on wear. During this period he also investigated the influence of stress on damping mechanisms in a collaboration with A. K. Mallik, and joined A.K Chakravorty in devising a solution for circular plates on an elastic foundation. Later, in a pair of 1980 papers co-authored with P. K. Nath, he turned his attention to kinetoelastodynamic analysis, and in 1982-3 devoted a series of articles with H. Hatwal and A. K. Mallik to the study and discovery of chaos in mechanical systems. In 1984 he embarked on the first of a series of studies on an extension of Newtonian mechanics leading to a modification of the laws of motion, followed by applications of the model to problems of solar system dynamics and galactic physics.

== Books ==
Amitabha Ghosh has also written and contributed to a number of books. The textbooks which he has written or co-authored span the fields of mechanisms and machines, manufacturing science, prototyping, the history of science and dynamics. His contributions have "made a lasting impression on the way the subjects are taught now in India and abroad."

- Ghosh, A. and Mallik, A. K. – Theory of Mechanisms and Machines, Affiliated East West Press, New Delhi, 1st ed., 1976, 2nd ed., 1988, 3rd ed., 1998, (29 printings)
- Ghosh, A. and Mallik, A. K. – Manufacturing Science, Affiliated East West Press, New Delhi, 1st ed., 1985, 2nd ed., 2010, (34 printings)
- Mallik, A. K., Ghosh, A. and Dittrich, G. – Kinematic Analysis and Synthesis of Mechanisms, CRC Press, USA, 1994, Indian Edition, 2015
- Ghosh, A. – Rapid Prototyping, Affiliated East West Press, New Delhi, 1995
- Ghosh, A. – Origin of Inertia: Extended Mach’s Principle and Cosmological Consequences, Affiliated East West Press, New Delhi, 2002
- Ghosh, A. – "Scaling Laws," in Mechanics over Micro and Nano Scales, Suman Chakraborty (ed), Springer Science+Business Media, 2011
- Ghosh, A. – Astronomy, Vol. 1, Pt. 2 of the series "History of Science in India," The National Academy of Sciences, India and Ramkrishna Mission Institute of Culture, Kolkata, March 2015
- Ghosh, A. and Corves, B. – Introduction to Micromechanisms and Microactuators, Springer, 2015
- Ghosh, A. – Introduction to Dynamics. Springer Science+Business Media, May 2018
- Ghosh, A. – Conceptual Evolution of Newtonian and Relativistic Mechanics. Springer, November, 2017
- Ghosh, A. – Descriptive Archaeoastronomy and Ancient Indian Chronology, Springer, May, 2020
- Ghosh, A. – Introduction to Analytical Mechanics, Springer Singapore, June, 2024
