= Gopal Kundu =

Indian cell biologist

- Born: 2 November 1959 (age 66); Bataspur, West Bengal
- Known for: Therapeutics; Biomarker (cell); Angiogenesis; Nanomedicine;
- Awards: N-BIOS Prize, Shanti Swarup Bhatnagar Prize for Science and Technology
- Scientific career
- Fields: Cancer
- Workplaces: National Centre for Cell Science

Gopal Chandra Kundu (born 2 November 1959) is an Indian cell and cancer biologist who worked as a scientist at the Indian National Centre for Cell Science. He is known for his contributions towards the understanding the mechanism of cancer progression in breast, melanoma and other cancers and development of novel therapeutic targets and target-based therapy in cancers.

An elected fellow of the Indian Academy of Sciences and the National Academy of Sciences, India, he received the National Bioscience Award for Career Development of the Department of Biotechnology in 2003. He was awarded the Shanti Swarup Bhatnagar Prize for Science and Technology, the highest Indian science awards, in 2004.

== Education and career ==
Kundu studied chemistry and biology at the Scottish Church College in Calcutta (now Kolkata), India. He obtained a B.Sc. with major in chemistry from the University of Calcutta (affiliating university of SCC) in 1980. He completed M.Sc. in chemistry at the University of Calcutta in 1982. He entered the Bose Institute, Kolkata, for a doctoral course and earned his Ph.D. in 1989 in protein biochemistry In 1989, he went to Cleveland Clinic Foundation, USA, as a post-doctoral fellow. For the next eight years, he worked as a research associate at the University of Colorado (1990-1992), and then as a senior research associate at the University of Wyoming (1992-1993) and the National Institutes of Health, Bethesda (1993-1998). He became specialised in cardiovascular biology, inflammation and immunomodulation during that period. In 1998, he joined the National Centre for Cell Science (NCCS), Pune, as Scientist-D. At NCCS, he published his most important research papers covering tumor biology, regulation of gene expression, cell signaling, angiogenesis, cancer therapeutics, biomarker studies for cancer detection, and nanomedicine.

In 2019, Kundu retired from the government service at superannuation age. He was immediately appointed as director of research and development at the Kalinga Institute of Industrial Technology (KIIT), a private university in Bhubaneswar, Odissa. He also holds professor positions in biotechnology at KIIT and in medicine and molecular research at Kalinga Institute of Medical Science.

He serves as Editorial Board Member of Current Molecular Medicine, Current Chemical Biology, Frontiers in Medicine, International Journal of Oncology, Molecular Medicine Reports, The Open Cancer Journal and American Journal of Cancer Research. He is an associate editor of Molecular Cancer and Journal of Cancer Metastasis and Treatment.

== Awards and honours ==
Kundu is elected Fellow of the National Academy of Sciences, India (2003), the Indian Academy of Sciences (2006) and Indian National Science Academy (2023). He is member of American Society for Biochemistry and Molecular Biology and New York Academy of Sciences. He was elected Fellow of the Royal Society of Chemistry in 2023.

=== Awards ===
In 1997, Kundu received Fellows Award for Research Excellence (FARE) from the US National Institute of Health of Health. In 2003, Kundu received the National Bioscience Award for Career Development from the Department of Biotechnology, government of India. In 2004, he was awarded the Shanti Swarup Bhatnagar Prize for Science and Technology in the field of biology, the award of which is considered as the most prestigious in science under the government of India. In 2007, the International Journal of Molecular Medicine from Greece gave him an "International award for an outstanding achievement in oncology". In 2013, he received the 7th National Grassroots Innovation Awards from the National Innovation Foundation for his works in cancer biology.

== Controversy ==
A controversy erupted in the NCCS in 2006 when an anonymous mail alleged that Kundu and others might have misrepresented data in a paper published in the Journal of Biological Chemistry. The allegation was that they had rehashed the same set of data which they had published earlier. An internal committee of the NCCS advised the authors to take back their paper, however an independent committee led by G. Padmanabhan, a former director of Indian Institute of Science, Bangalore, concluded that there was no manipulation in the data. On 23 February 2007, the Journal of Biological Chemistry withdrew the paper amid allegations of data manipulation, although the authors maintained that the two papers used different set of data though similar experiments.

== See also ==
- Scientific plagiarism in India
