= Kasturi Lal Chopra =

Indian materials physicist (1933–2021)

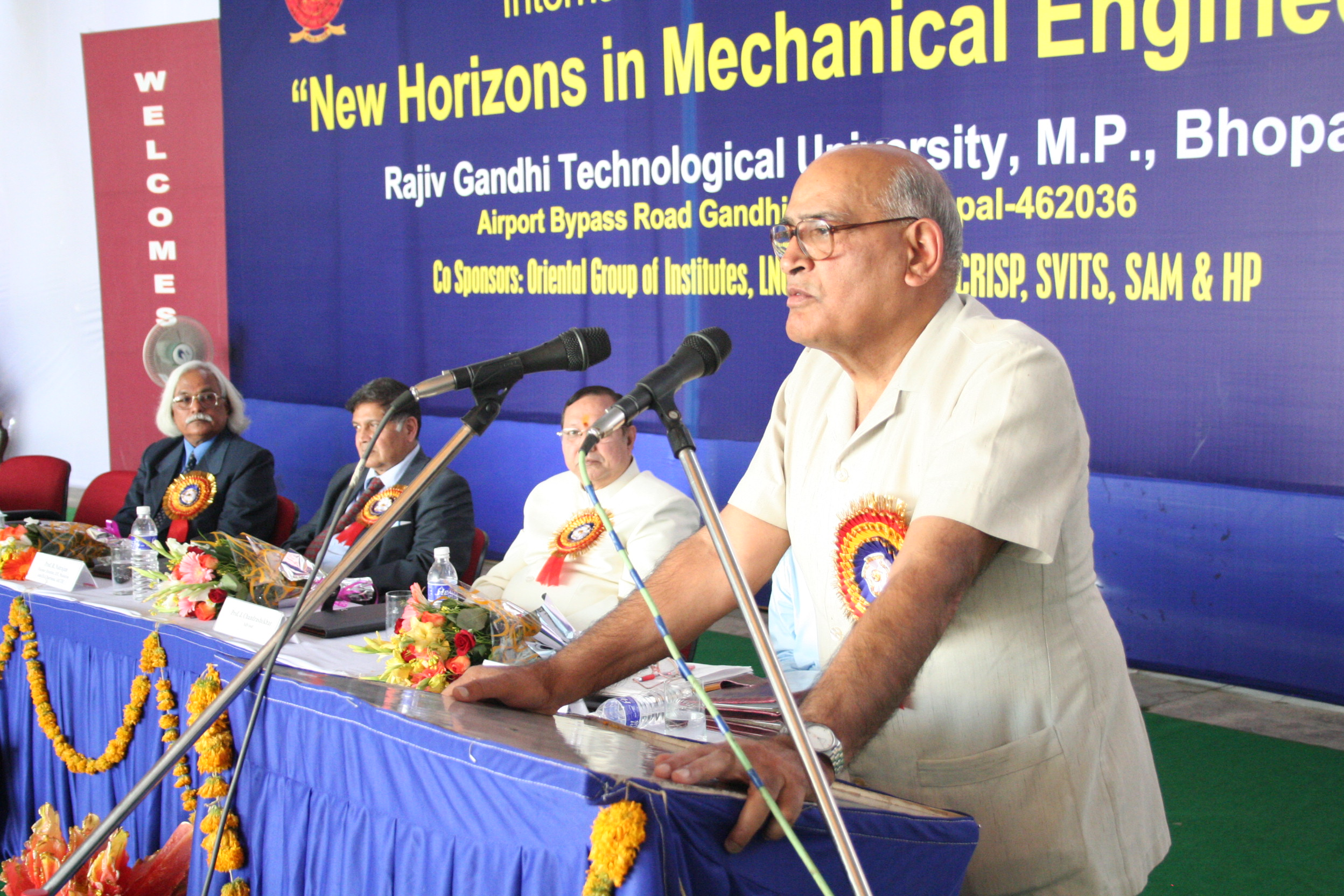
- Inaugurating a seminar at Rajiv Gandhi Technological University

Director at Indian Institute of Technology Kharagpur
- In office 1987–1997
- Preceded by: G. S. Sanyal
- Succeeded by: Amitabha Ghosh

Professor at Indian Institute of Technology Delhi
- In office 1970–1987

Personal details
- Born: 31 July 1933 Chahal Kalan, Gujranwala District, Punjab Province, British India
- Died: 18 May 2021 (aged 87)
- Spouse: Asha Suri Chopra
- Children: 3
- Occupation: Academic, Material Physicist
- Known for: Nanoscience; Thin film technology
- Awards: Padma Shri; Shanti Swarup Bhatnagar Prize; INSA P. C. Mahalanobis Medal; INSA Aryabhatta Medal; Om Prakash Bhasin Award; UGC Bhabha Award; FICCI Award; MRSI Distinguished Materials Scientist of the Year Award; Kennecott Copper Corporation Patent Award; IVS Distinguished Vacuum Scientist Award; SESI Lifetime Achievement Award; ISME Distinguished Engineering Educator Award; IITD Freedom of the Institute Award; IITP Distinguished Academician Award

Kasturi Lal Chopra (31 July 1933 – 18 May 2021) was an Indian materials physicist and a director of the Indian Institute of Technology, Kharagpur. He was the founder of the Thin Film Laboratory at Indian Institute of Technology, Delhi and the Microscience Laboratory at IIT, Kharagpur and held several US and Indian patents for his research findings. Author of a number of books on thin film technology, he was a recipient of Shanti Swarup Bhatnagar Prize, the highest Indian award in the science and technology categories. The Government of India awarded him the fourth highest civilian honour of the Padma Shri, in 2008, for his contributions to science and engineering.

== Biography ==
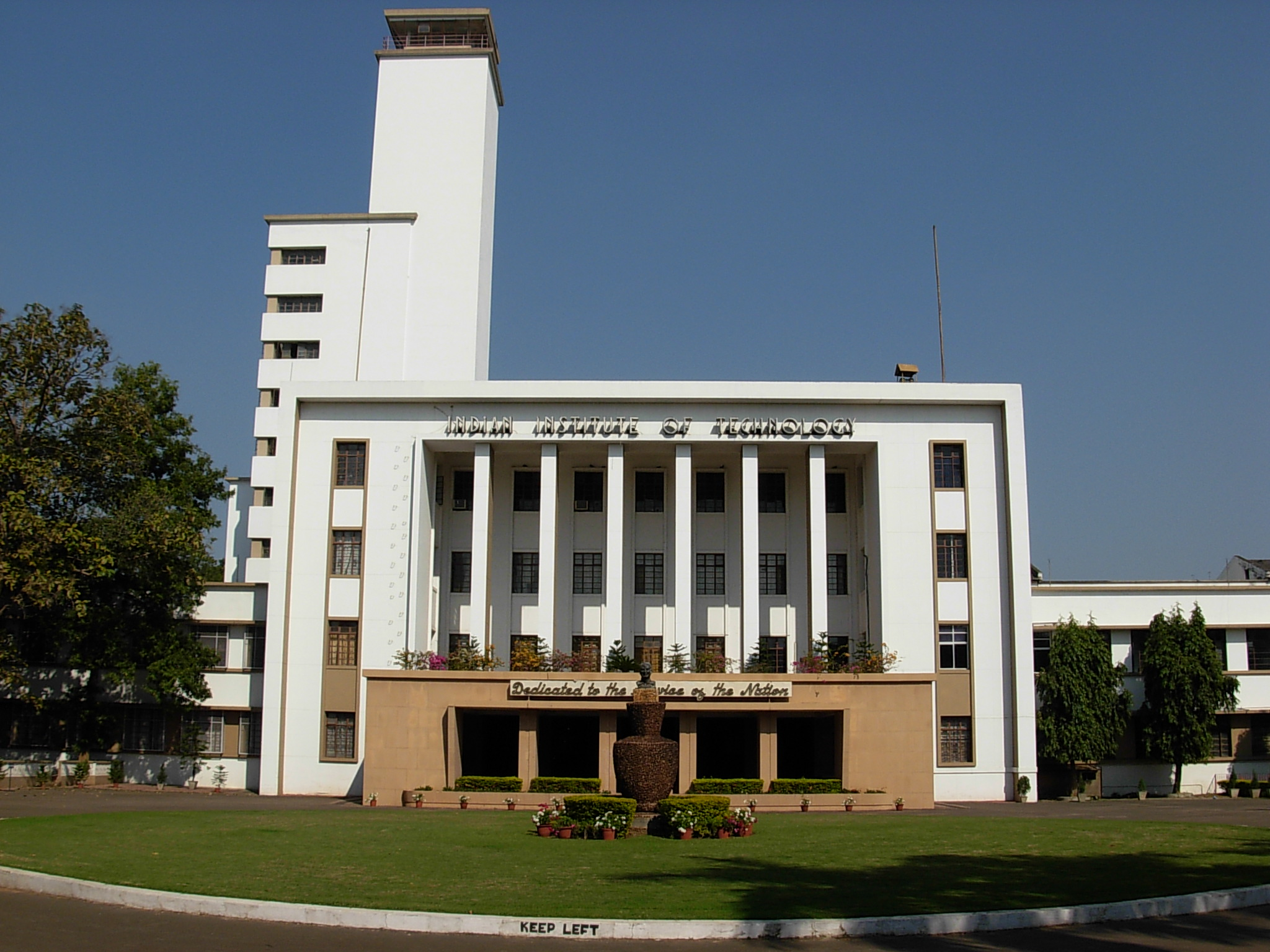
Institute Main Building, IIT Kharagpur

K. L. Chopra was born on 31 July 1933 at Chahal Kalan in the Gujranwala District of British Punjab Province to Jagat Ram and Chanan Devi Chopra. He studied science at the University of Delhi from which he graduated with honors in physics in 1952, and followed it up with a master's degree from the same university in 1954. He pursued his doctoral studies at the University of British Columbia on a fellowship and secured his PhD in low temperature physics in 1957. Continuing his stay in North America, he served as a defence research fellow at the Royal Military College of Canada (1957–59) and as a staff scientist at Philco-Ford Scientific Laboratory (1962–64) and Ledgemont Laboratory of Kennecott Copper Corporation (1964–70), during which time he also took up academic positions as an adjunct professor at Northeastern University and as a visiting professor at Cornell University. Concurrently, he served as a consultant to IBM, Westinghouse and ARCO and had a short stint at Fritz Haber Institute of the Max Planck Society, Berlin (1959–62) in between, as their fellow. Returning to India, he was appointed as a senior professor of solid state physics at the Indian Institute of Technology, Delhi in 1970 where he served till 1987, holding positions such as that of the Head of Department of Physics (1970–73), Dean of the Faculty of Science (1973–74), Chair and Dean Industrial Research and Development (1975–76), Dean of the Post Graduate Studies and Research (1976–79), Head of the Centre for Energy Studies (1983–85), Senior Professor of Physics and Head of the Thin Film Solid State Technology Laboratory and the Dean of Industrial Research and Development (1985–87) till his superannuation in 1987.

Chopra was invited to head the Indian Institute of Technology, Kharagpur in 1987 and worked there till 1997 as the Director of the Institution when he was appointed as the Chair Professor of Renewable Energy at Indian Renewable Energy Development Agency (IREDA), a post he held till 2000. After retiring from active service in 2000, he continues his association with many scientific and academic institutions and chairs HDF School of Management, Bhubaneswar and Budge Budge Institute of Technology, Kolkata while holding the distinguished chair professorship of Indian Institute of Engineering Science and Technology, Shibpur (formerly known as BESU, Kolkata). He was also an adviser to the Thin Film Laboratory of IIT, Delhi, and Jaypee University of Engineering and Technology, Madhya Pradesh. He was the founder member of the Society for Scientific Values, an organization serving as a watchdog for promoting integrity and ethics in scientific pursuit, and served as its president and then patron until his death. He served as the vice president of the Materials Research Society of India and was a life member of the society. He was also a former member of the council of the Indian National Science Academy (1988–90) and served as an honorary professor at King Fahd University of Petroleum and Minerals, Saudi Arabia, IIT Delhi, IIEST Shibpur and Indian Institute of Technology Bhubaneswar.

Chopra died following an infection with COVID-19 on 19 May 2021, at the age of 87. He and his wife also had bilateral knee osteoarthritis.

== Legacy ==
Working on thin films and nanomatter, Chopra did pioneering studies through which he established specular scattering of electrons in epitaxial metal films, discovered field induced nucleation and growth process as well as giant photocontraction effect in amorphous chalcogenide films, developed semiconducting metallopolymer films and proposed new process protocols for low dimensional nanomaterials and high temperature superconductors. He published his findings through more than 430 research articles and ten books, which include Thin film phenomena, Thin Film Solar Cells, Thin Film Device Applications and Vacuum Science and Technology. He also edited two books, Thin Film Technology and Applications: International Workshop, New Delhi, Nov. 1984, Proceedings and Thin Films 7: Proceedings of the 7th International Conference on Thin Films, New Delhi, India, December 7–11, 1987. He held six US patents and eight of his know-hows are in use with Indian industries. Besides, he mentored 100 MTech and 60 PhD students in their researches and served as a member of the editorial boards of many journals. It was during his tenure as the head of the institution, the Thin Film Laboratory of IIT Delhi and Microscience Laboratory of IIT Kharagpur were established.

== Awards and honors ==
During his stay in the US, Chopra received four patent awards from Kennecott Copper Corporation between 1966 and 1970. The Council of Scientific and Industrial Research awarded him Shanti Swarup Bhatnagar Prize, the highest Indian award in the science and engineering categories, in 1975. He received FICCI Award in 1983 and two more awards in 1989, Bhabha Award of the University Grants Commission and Om Prakash Bhasin Award. The Indian Vacuum Society awarded him Distinguished Vacuum Scientist Award in 1994, and the next year, he received the Distinguished Material Scientist Award of the Materials Research Society of India, the highest award of the society. The Indian National Science Academy awarded him the Prasanta Chandra Mahalanobis Medal in 1996 and the Aryabhata Medal in 2004. In between, he received two awards, the Lifetime Achievement Award of the Solar Energy Society of India and ISI Citation Laureate Award. The Government of India included him in the Republic Day honors list for the civilian honor of the Padma Shri in 2008 and he received the Distinguished Engineering Educator Award of the Indian Society of Mechanical Engineers, the same year. He is also a recipient of the Freedom of the Institute Award of the IIIT Delhi and Distinguished Academician Award of Indian Institute of Technology Patna.

The Indian National Science Academy elected Chopra as their fellow in 1978 and the Indian Academy of Sciences and the National Academy of Sciences, India followed suit in 1980 and 1988 respectively. He was also an elected fellow of the Indian National Academy of Engineering, Asian Pacific Society for Materials Research and the American Physical Society and an honorary fellow of Punjab Academy of Sciences. Uttar Pradesh Technical University conferred the degree of Doctor of Science (honoris causa) on him in 2006, followed by the Indian Institute of Technology, Kharagpur in 2010. He delivered several award orations and keynote addresses including K. S. Krishnan Memorial Award Lecture of the Indian National Science Academy (1992), Biren Roy Memorial Lecture Award (1997), Institute Lecture on Ethical Values in Science and Technology of the Indian Institute of Technology, Kanpur (2008) and D. S. Kothari Memorial Oration Award of the Defence Laboratory, Jodhpur (2009).

== Selected bibliography ==
- Kasturi L. Chopra (1979). Thin Film Phenomena. Malabar : Robert E. Krieger Publishing Company. ISBN 978-0-88275-746-9.
- Kasturi L. Chopra (1988). Thin Films 7: Proceedings of the 7th International Conference on Thin Films, New Delhi, India, December 7-11, 1987. Elsevier Applied Science. ISBN 978-1-85166-980-6.
- K.L. Chopra; S.R. Das (31 July 1983). Thin Film Solar Cells. Springer Science & Business Media. ISBN 978-0-306-41141-0.
- K.L. Chopra; L.K. Malhotra, Indian Institute of Technology. Thin Film Laboratory - Committee on Science and Technology in Developing Countries (1985). Thin Film Technology and Applications: International Workshop, New Delhi, Nov. 1984, Proceedings. Tata McGraw-Hill.
- Dr. V.V. Rao; Dr. T.B. Gosh, Dr. K.L. Chopra (17 October 1998). Vacuum Science and Technology. Allied Publishers. ISBN 978-81-7023-763-1.

== See also ==
- Scientific plagiarism in India
