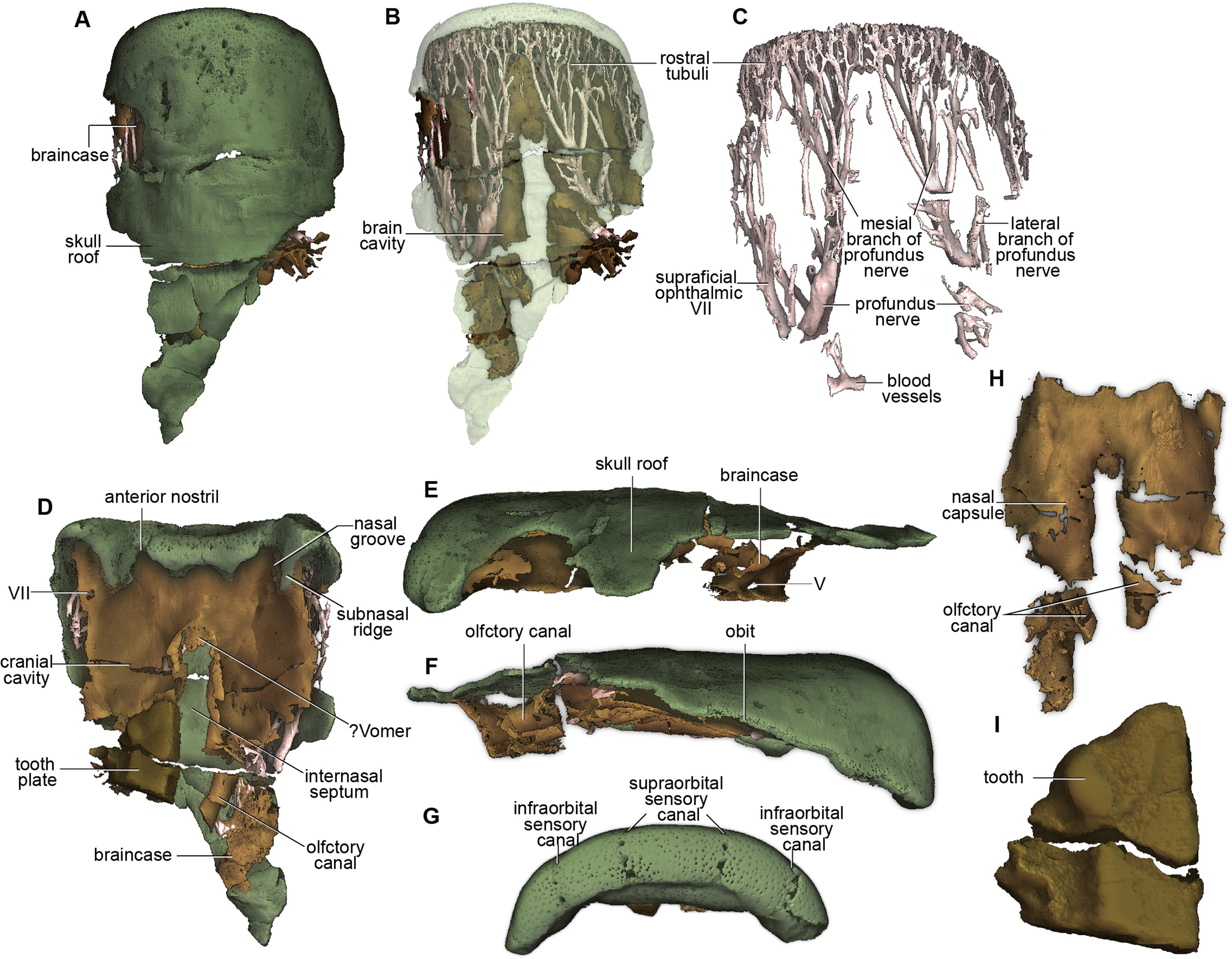
- Details of the holotype based on HRCT data

Scientific classification
- Kingdom: Animalia
- Phylum: Chordata
- Class: Dipnoi
- Family: †Holodontidae
- Genus: †Talentichthys; Young & Lu, 2026
- Species: †T. kuragh

Binomial name
- †Talentichthys kuragh Young & Lu, 2026

= Talentichthys =

Talentichthys Temporal range: Upper Devonian, Famennian

Genus of extinct lungfish

Talentichthys (lit. 'Talent fish') is an extinct genus of lungfish (class Dipnoi) in the family Holodontidae known from the Upper Devonian (Famennian age) Shogrãm Formation of Pakistan. The genus contains a single species, Talentichthys kuragh, known from a partial skull.

== Discovery and naming ==
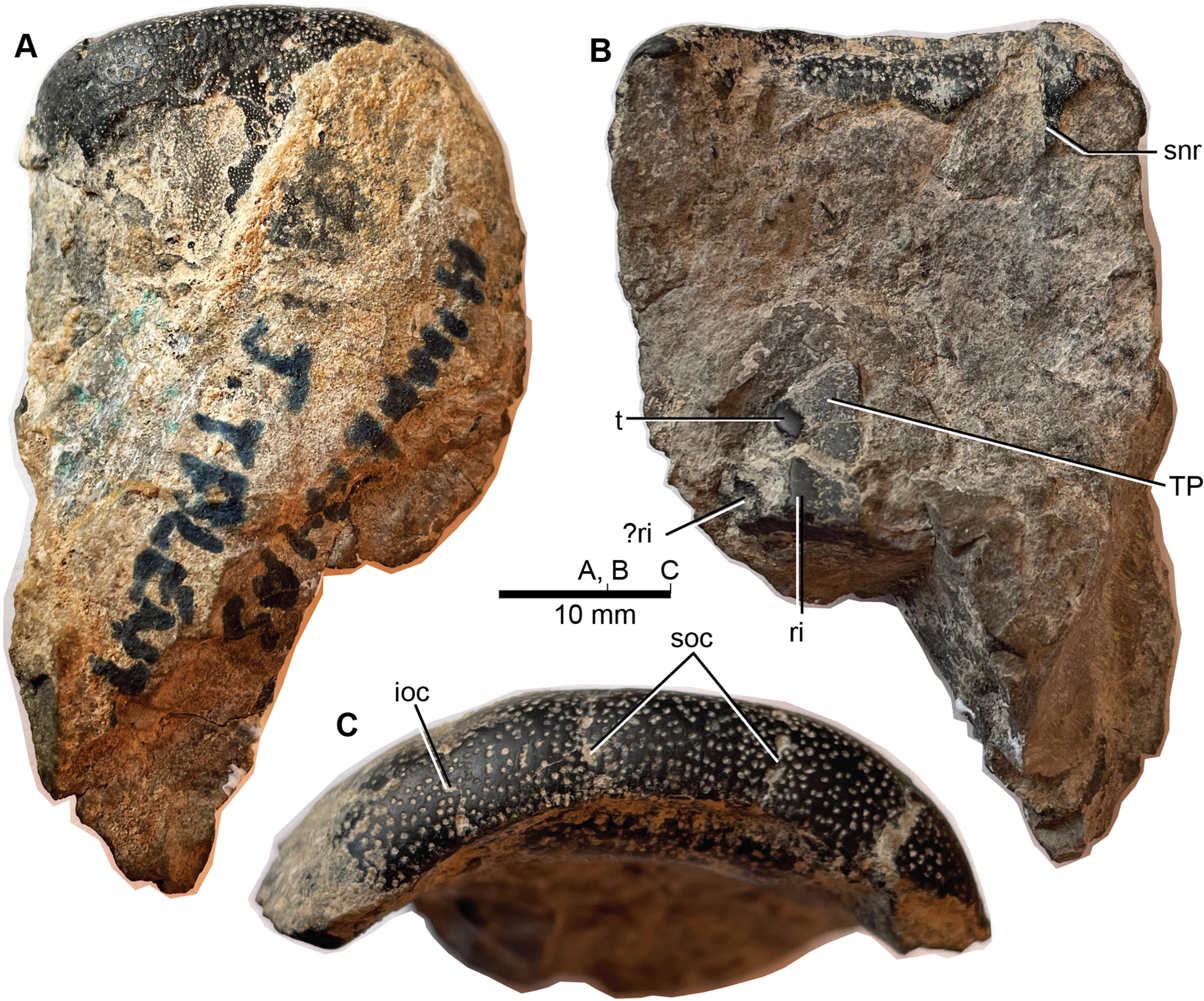
Holotype as preserved

The Talentichthys fossil material was discovered in 1976 by a team including John A. Talent and others while they were measuring the stratigraphic section at Kurãgh Spur, about 55 kilometres (34 mi) northeast of Chitral, Pakistan. These outcrops are assigned to the Shogrãm Formation. Curiously, a publication ten years prior by V. H. Gupta and Robert H. Denison had noted the seemingly significant discovery of a partial fossil skull and scales of a lungfish from nearby, in Kashmir, India, a claim noted to be surprising, given its remote locality and the few fossils known from that area. However, later investigations showed that the descriptions of many Himalayan specimens that Gupta was involved with were fraudulent; this alleged lungfish fossil was actually from the Achanarras Quarry of Scotland.

The Pakistani fossil went largely unnoticed in the years following its discovery, being acknowledged only vaguely as a dipnoan occurrence labeled on a figure by Talent et al. in 1999. In 2009, Gavin C. Young found the specimen, embedded in a piece of limestone, in an 'oddments drawer' of a collection of fossil fish at the Australian National University (ANU). This fossil, provisionally catalogued as ANU V3736, had been sent to the ANU for identification but was regarded as too fragmentary to provide much information. Later work will likely result in the specimen being re-accessioned at the Australian Museum or returned to an institution in Pakistan. In 2018, high-resolution computed tomography (HRCT) scans were made of the skull to study it in greater detail, including its internal anatomy, nerve canals, and other structures of the braincase. The skull is incomplete, preserving only the anterior (toward the front) snout region.

In 2026, Gavin C. Young and Jing Lu described Talentichthys kuragh as a new genus and species of holodontid lungfish based on these fossil remains, establishing ANU V3736 as the holotype specimen. The generic name, Talentichthys, honors John A. Talent, the discoverer of the only known specimen, combined with the Greek word ichthys, meaning 'fish'. The specific name, kuragh, references the stratigraphic section of the same name from which the holotype was collected.
