= Bangalore Puttaiya Radhakrishna =

Indian geologist (1918–2012)

- Born: 30 April 1918; Bangalore, British India
- Died: 26 January 2012; Bangalore, India
- Scientific career
- Fields: Precambrian Geology, Economic Geology and Groundwater Hydrology

Bangalore Puttaiya Radhakrishna (or B P Radhakrishna, also popularly known as BPR; 30 April 1918 – 26 January 2012), was one of the leading geologists of India. He was often referred to as 'The Doyen of Indian geology'. He was a resident of Bangalore and regularly wrote the editorial in the Journal of the Geological Society of India published by the Geological Society of India.

== Life and career ==
B P Radhakrishna was born on 30 April 1918 at Bangalore, as the third son of Sri Bangalore Puttaiya, a well-known public figure of Mysore State. BPR graduated from the Central College, Bangalore in the year 1937 obtaining BSc (Hons) degree in geology in First Class and securing a gold medal.

Soon after graduation, he joined the Mysore Geological Department (MGD) as a field assistant at the young age of 19.

BPR served the department for 37 years and retired from service in 1974. His tenure of office as Director of the department saw a great expansion in activities, especially in mineral resource development and the utilisation of groundwater resources of the State.

BPR will be remembered for his service to the cause of geology in India. Besides being a core member of the group that conceived the idea of forming the Geological Society of India in 1958 for "improvement in the standard of geological research, by providing a forum for free exchange of ideas and media for quick publications of results and wide dissemination of knowledge", he served as the first Secretary for fifteen years and later as the editor between 1974 and 1992.

The Society under his fostering care has developed and continues to flourish. The Journal which was issued once a year became a monthly. Apart from maintaining high standards for the Journal, a series of other publications, Memoirs, Lecture Notes, Field Guide Books, Mineral Resource Series and Text Books of Geology and Mineral Resources of individual States have been brought out.

BPR always paid attention to the organisation of Symposia, Group Discussions and Field Workshops. For the past few years the Annual Meetings of the society are being held at different centres in the country to emphasise the national character of the Society and also to spot promising young talent and encourage its development.

The publications of the Society have exercised a beneficial influence on the growth of Earth Science Studies in India. The Society has grown in stature and has nearly 2000 members on its roll. BPR's deep involvement and selfless service are central to the Society.

BPR always encouraged multi-disciplinary efforts to study geological problems. The distinguishing character of his approach was his remarkable independence, he was reluctant to seek governmental support for the Society. On the contrary, he firmly believed in personal commitment involving the intellectual labour of its fellows rather than financial contributions.

== Awards and distinctions ==
Various awards and distinctions have been conferred on BPR.

- Fellow of the Indian Academy of Sciences, elected in 1956.
- National Mineral Award of the Govt. of India (1971).
- Fellow of Indian National Science Academy, elected in 1972.
- Honorary Fellow of the Geological Society of London, elected in 1986.
- Honorary Fellow of the Geological Society of America, elected in 1988.
- The Pramatha Nath Bose Medal of the Asiatic Society, Calcutta for the year 1990.
- Honorary Doctor of Science by Indian School of Mines (1992).
- National Mineral Award for Excellence of Govt. of India (2000).
- Rajyotsava Award of Govt. of Karnataka, India.
- D.N. Wadia Gold Medal by the Indian National Science Academy (1993).
- "Padma Shree Awards" by the President of India(1991).
- The Karnataka Sahitya Academy recognised the biography he written on 'Raman' as the best biographies produced in Kannada in 1989.
