= John Alfred Talent =

Australian palaeontologist (1932–2024)

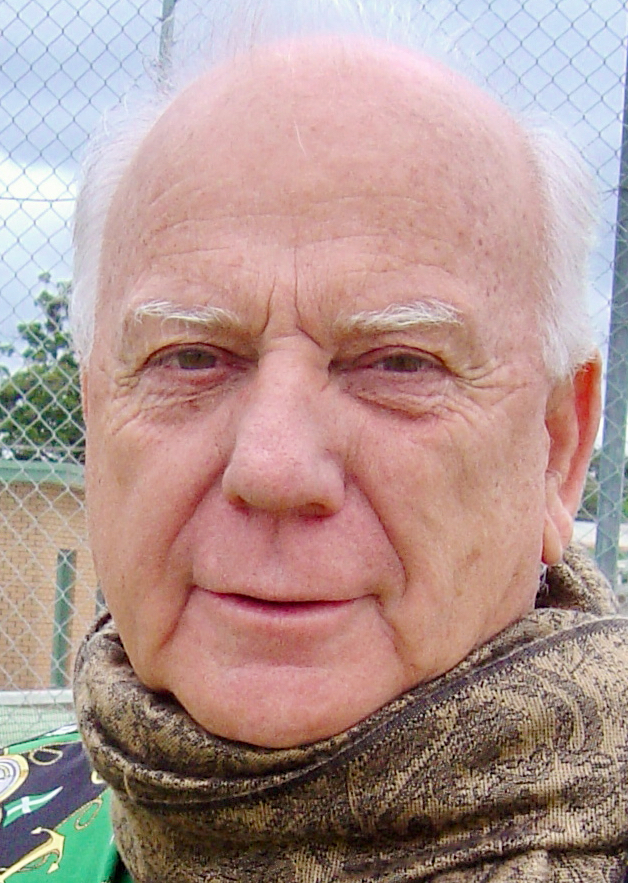
- Born: 18 October 1932; Ascot Vale, Victoria, Australia
- Died: 27 March 2024 (aged 91)
- Education: University of Melbourne
- Known for: Role in uncovering Himalayan fossil hoax Devonian geology and life
- Awards: Etheridge medal, 2020
- Scientific career
- Fields: Palaeontology
- Workplaces: Department of Mines, Melbourne, Australia; Royal Belgian Institute of Natural Sciences(Research Associate), Division of Geological Sciences, California Institute of Technology (visiting Associate Professor); Dacca University (professor); Macquarie University (professor)
- Thesis: Contributions to the stratigraphy and palaeontology of the Silurian and Devonian of Gippsland (1959)
- Doctoral advisor: Edmund Dwen Gill

John Alfred Talent (18 October 1932 – 27 March 2024) was an Australian palaeontologist whose research and teaching career was spent largely at Macquarie University in Sydney, Australia. He is remembered particularly for leading the effort in the 1980s and 1990s to expose the large body of fraudulent publications by Vishwa Jit Gupta of Panjab University, which is collectively known as the Himalayan fossil hoax. Several species and genera have been named in his honour.

== Biography ==
Talent was born to Alfred George Talent and Thelma Emily (née Henderson) at Ascot Vale, Victoria. He studied science at the University of Melbourne, graduating in science with majors in geology, chemistry and mathematics in 1953 and completing his master's degree in 1955 with a dissertation on Studies in the stratigraphy and paleontology of some paleozoic limestones of Eastern Victoria. He obtained a PhD in 1959 on the thesis Contributions to the stratigraphy and palaeontology of the Silurian and Devonian of Gippsland. He followed this in 1966 by taking a bachelor of arts degree in 1966 with majors in French and fine arts, and a minor in Arabic.

Talent was awarded a post-doctoral fellowship from the Commonwealth Scientific and Industrial Research Organisation (CSIRO) with which he spent time in Brussels, Belgium, between 1961 and 1962. He worked there as Research Associate at the Institut royal des Sciences naturelles de Belgique (the Royal Belgian Institute of Natural Sciences). He was initially employed as a geologist under the Department of Mines, Government of Victoria. In early 1967, he was visiting faculty at the California Institute of Technology (Caltech). Late in the year he got appointment in the faculty of the University of Dhaka, Bangladesh, as UNESCO professor. In 1969, he joined the department of Earth and Planetary Sciences, a newly established faculty at Macquarie University. After normal retirement, he was elected Emeritus Professor, the position he held till his death.

Talent served as president of the International Palaeontological Association in 1999. He was elected a Fellow of the Royal Society of Victoria in 1996.

== Contributions ==
His interests covered many fossil animal taxa, particularly brachiopods and conodonts. He worked collaboratively with scientists in many other countries, notably Russia, as well as in Australia where his principal collaborator Ruth Mawson and numerous graduate students helped to build a legacy of inter-related publications. Mass extraction of silicified fossils from limestone samples using a specially built facility at Macquarie University provided ample material for these studies.

Talent was a long-term contributor to the International Commission on Stratigraphy's Subcommission on Devonian Stratigraphy, working to align geological time-intervals around the world.

== Unmasking the Himalayan fossil hoax ==
Although it had been clear to many Indian palaeontologists that Vishwa Jit Gupta's work on the geology of the Himalayas contained so many implausible statements that it was useless as a basis for subsequent work, the full extent of the anomalies was unclear because it had been assumed that the problems were caused by incompetence. Talent and collaborators worked diligently for several years to catalogue the various types of misrepresentation involved, concluding that deliberate deception by Gupta took many forms, that his body of work was "fictitious".

== Eponymy ==
Talent had many species and genera named in his honour, and one family, including:

Class Asteroidea

- Family Talentasteridae Peter Alexander Jell, 2026
  - Talentaster Peter Alexander Jell, 2026
    - Talentaster biradialis (Withers & Keble), 2026

Class: Bivalvia:

- Cornellites talenti Johnson, 1991
- Notonucula talenti Bradshaw, 1999

Class: Cephalopoda:

- Ivoites (Ivoites) talenti Ralph Thomas Becker & Clem Earp, 2026
- Talenticeras Erben, 1965
  - Talenticeras talenti Erben, 1965

Class Conodonta

- Icriodus talenti Ashouri, 2006
- Linguipolygnathus talenti Bardashev, Weddige & Ziegler, 2002
- Polygnathus talenti Tagarieva, 2026

Class: Dipnoi

- Talentichthys Young & Lu, 2026

Class: Gastropoda

- Palaeoalvania talenti Yoo, 1994

Class: Pterobranchia

- Stelechocladia talenti Rickards & Wright, 1997

Class: Trilobita:

- Australoscutellum talenti Holloway & Lane, 2016
- Homalonotus talenti Sandford, 2005
- Proetus talenti Chatterton, 1971

Phylum: Brachiopoda:

- Apheoorthis talenti Brock, Zhang and Smith, 2026
- Atrypina talenti Savage, 1970
- Molongella talenti Savage, 1974
- Notoconchidium talenti Wright & Garratt, 2013
- Reticulariopsis talenti Lenz & Johnson, 1985
- Spinella talenti Johnson, 1970
- Talentella Johnson, 1990

Phylum Arthropoda, Class Branchiopoda

- Cyzicus talenti Tasch, 1987
