= Laws of motion =

Various theories in physics

In physics, a number of noted theories of the motion of objects have developed. Among the best known are:

- Classical mechanics
  - Newton's laws of motion
  - Euler's laws of motion
  - Cauchy's equations of motion
  - Kepler's laws of planetary motion
- General relativity
- Special relativity
- Quantum mechanics
