= Current Molecular Medicine =

- Discipline: Molecular medicine
- Language: English
- Edited by: Andras Guttman

Publication details
- History: 2001–present
- Publisher: Bentham Science Publishers
- Frequency: 9/year
- Impact factor: 2.222 (2021)

Standard abbreviations
- ISO 4: Curr. Mol. Med.

Indexing
- CODEN: CMMUBP
- ISSN: 1566-5240 (print); 1875-5666 (web)
- OCLC no.: 47091629

Links
- Journal homepage; Online access; Online archive

Current Molecular Medicine is a peer-reviewed medical journal published by Bentham Science Publishers. The editor-in-chief is Andras Guttman (University of Pannonia). The journal covers research on molecular mechanisms of disease pathogenesis, the development of molecular diagnosis, and/or novel approaches to rational treatment. Formats of publication include original research reports, review papers, and rapid communications ("letters").

== Abstracting and indexing ==
Current Molecular Medicine is indexed in the following databases:

- Chemical Abstracts Service - CASSI
- EMBASE
- EMBiology
- MEDLINE
- Science Citation Index Expanded
- Scopus

According to Journal Citation Reports, the journal has a 2020 impact factor of 2.222.
