= Geological Society of India =

The Geological Society of India is based in Bangalore, India. Its flagship product is the Journal of the Geological Society of India (JGSI).

== Establishment ==
As declared in the JGSI, the society was established on May 28, 1958, to promote the cause of advanced study and research in all branches of earth system science.

== Governance ==
The society is administered by a council having a term of three years. The president of the current council is the geologist 'B. P. Radhakrishna' who occasionally writes on pressing science-society issues. The geological society has three classes of membership: Life/Annual Membership; Honorary fellows; Corporate members. The fellows are elected once a year by the council. The society has found the life memberships it offered long ago to be a burden in the sense that life fellows do not have to contribute to the society monetarily but the society has to honour the subscriptions.

The society publishes its journal monthly. It also publishes memoirs, textbooks, field guides and an economic geology series, all related to the geology of India.

== Journal of the Geological Society of India ==
The journal publishes peer reviewed articles on all aspects of earth science. Most contributions are from India, with a few from neighbouring countries and rarely from outside the continent. A scientometric assessment of the journal has suggested that to improve the journal's impact factor more review papers, increased international authorship, and broadening of subject areas of publication may be attempted.

The present editor is Fareeduddin. The editorial board has B. B. Bhattacharya (Calcutta), D. K. Paul (Calcutta), G. V. R. Prasad (University of Jammu) and M. Ramakrishnan (Chennai) as members.

== See also ==
- Geological Society of London
- Geological Society of America
