= Philippe Janvier =

French paleontologist

Philippe Janvier is a French paleontologist, specialising in Palaeozoic vertebrates, who currently works at the Museum National de l’Histoire Naturelle in Paris. He has written several books and scientific papers on Palaeozoic vertebrates and contributed to the Tree of Life phylogeny project. He has led the largest paleontology research group in France (currently called the CR2P), located in Paris. Janvier received the award of the Grand prix scientifique de la Fondation Simone et Cino del Duca (Institut de France) on June 11, 2008, for his work. He was a founding member of the Société Française de Systématique. He is currently Associate Editor of the Comptes Rendus Palevol (one of the series of the Comptes rendus de l'Académie des sciences) for paleoichthyology. He was elected member of the Académie des Sciences on 18 November 2014.

== Bibliography ==
- Janvier, Philippe. (1993). Patterns of diversity in the skull of jawless fishes. In The Skull (ed. J. Hanken and B. K. Hall), Vol. 2, pp. 131–188. The University of Chicago Press.
- Janvier, Philippe. 1996. Early Vertebrates (1996). Oxford Monographs on Geology and Geophysics, v. 33, Oxford University Press, Oxford, England, pp 259-287.
- Janvier, Philippe. 2003. Early Vertebrates (2003). Oxford Monographs on Geology and Geophysics, v. 33, Oxford University Press, Oxford, England, ISBN 978-0-19-854047-2 pp. - a comprehensive review of the phylogeny and technical characteristics of Paleozoic fish
- Forey, P. L., and Janvier, P. (1993). Agnathans and the origin of jawed vertebrates. Nature, 361, 129–134.
- Forey, P. L., and Janvier, P. (1994). Evolution of the early vertebrates. American Scientist, 82, 554–565.
