= George Jennings Hinde =

British geologist and paleontologist

- Born: 24 March 1839; Norwich
- Died: 18 March 1918 (aged 78); Croydon
- Awards: Lyell Medal
- Scientific career
- Fields: Paleontology
- Thesis: Fossil Sponge-Spicules from the Upper Chalk, found in the Interior of a Single Flintstone from Horstead Norfolk. (1880)
- Doctoral advisor: Professor Karl Alfred Ritter von Zittel (1839-1904)

George Jennings Hinde (24 March 1839 – 18 March 1918) was a British geologist and paleontologist.

== Works ==
Extensive studies on scolecodonts by George J. Hinde of material from England, Wales, Canada and Sweden established a basis for the nomenclature of what he regarded as being isolated components of annelid jaws; but study of them lapsed thereafter for almost 50 years.

He also studied conodonts from Canada and the United States or from Scotland. He named the genus Polygnathus in 1879.

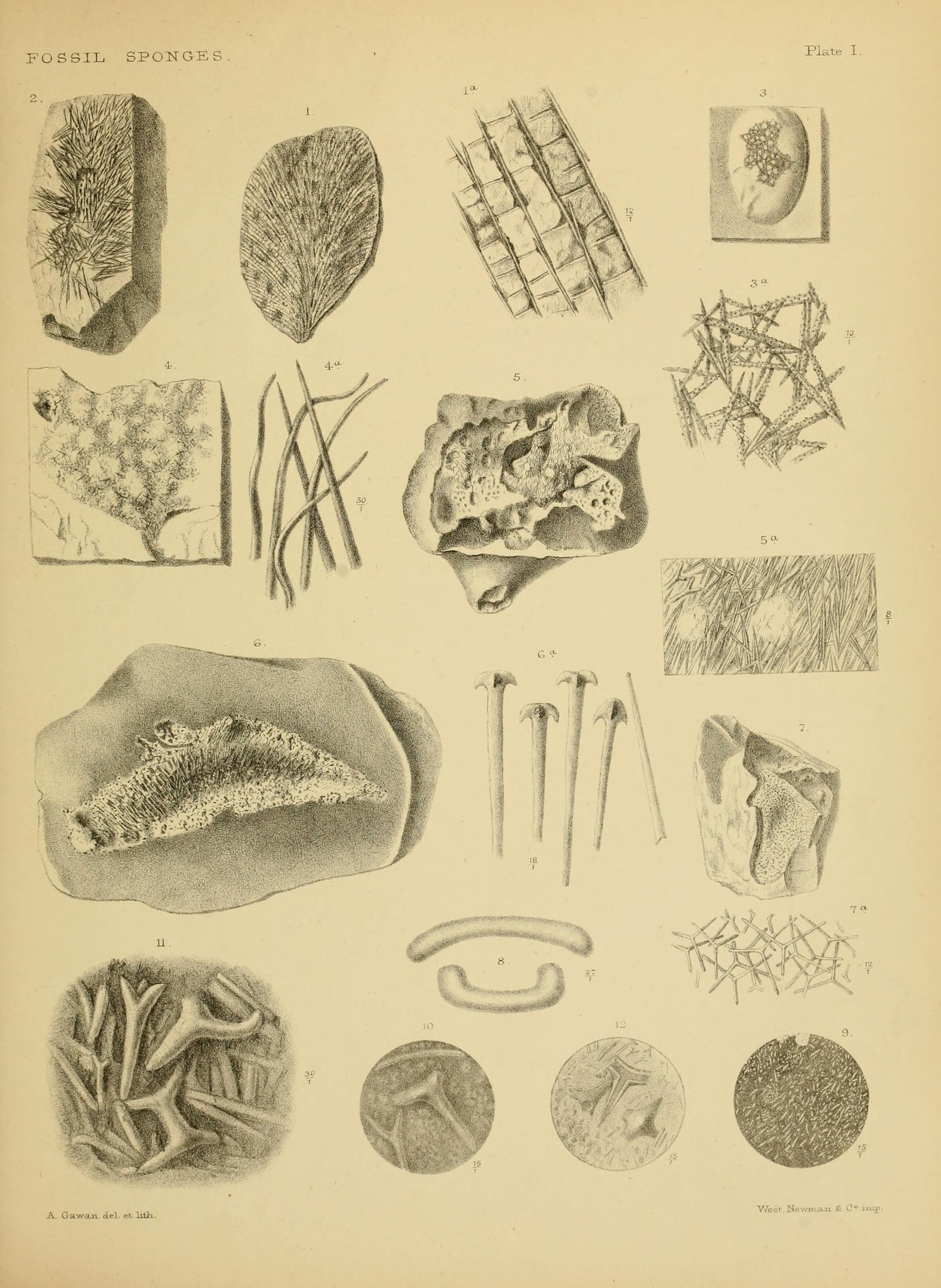
Plate I of Catalogue of the fossil sponges in the Geological Department of the British Museum (Natural History). With descriptions of new and little-known species

He published the Catalogue of the fossil sponges in the Geological Department of the British Museum (Natural History). With descriptions of new and little-known species (Illustrated by 38 lithographic plates.) in 1883

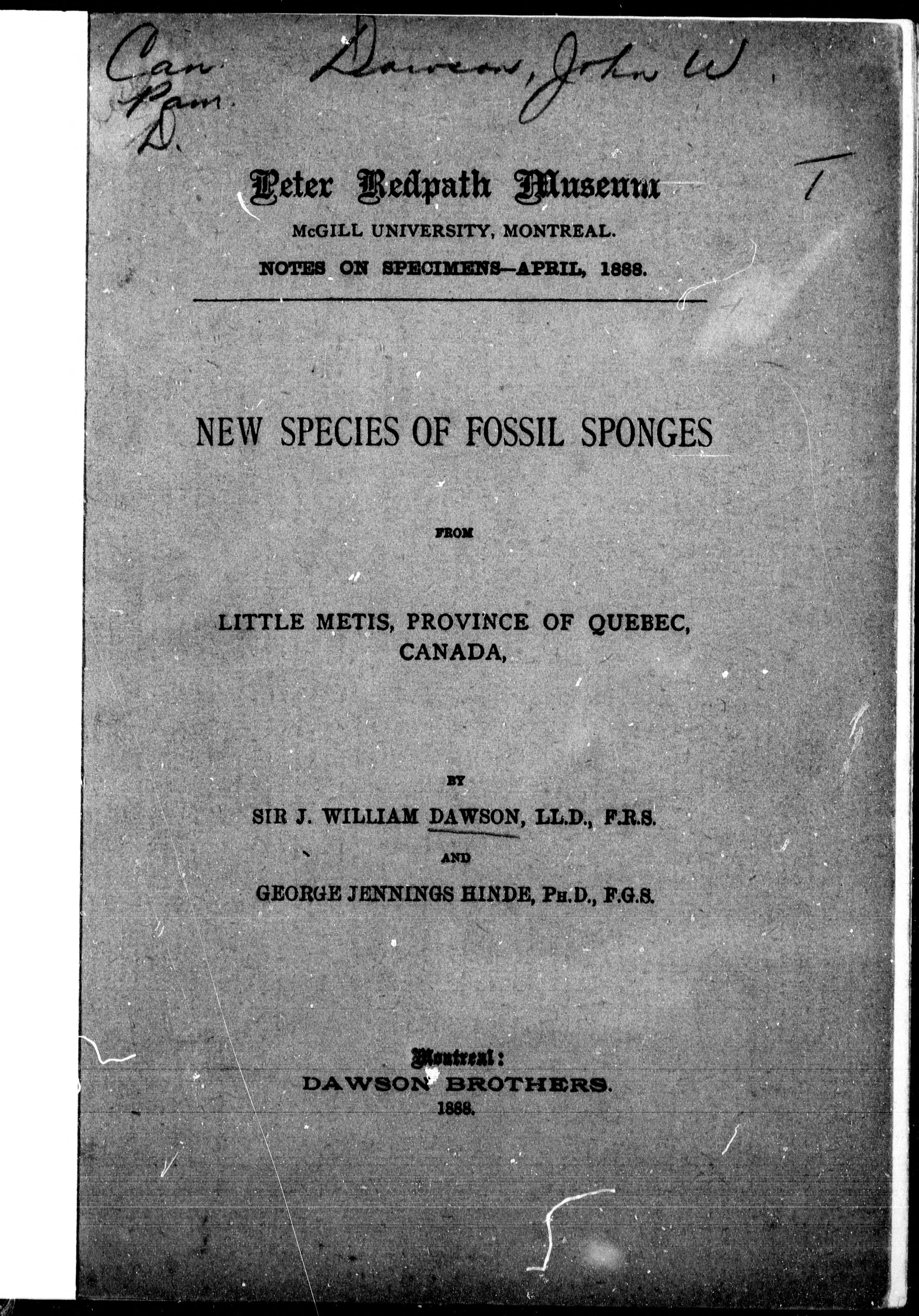
New species of fossil sponges from Little Metis, province of Quebec, Canada by John William Dawson and George Jennings Hinde.

In 1888, he published with John William Dawson New species of fossil sponges from Little Metis, province of Quebec, Canada.

== Awards ==
In 1896, he became a Fellow of the Royal Society.

In 1897, he was a recipient of the Lyell Medal, a prestigious annual scientific medal given by the Geological Society of London.

== Tributes ==
The Hinde Medal is an award given by the Pander Society, an informal organisation founded in 1967 for the promotion of the study of conodont palaeontology.

The conodont genera Hindeodella, Hindeodelloides and Hindeodus are named after G.J. Hinde.

The specific epithet hindei, referring to prehistoric animals, is a tribute to G.J. Hinde. It can be found in species such as:

- Diagoniella hindei, a sponge species
- Choia hindei, a sponge species
- Calceolispongia hindei, a crinoid species
