= Herman Boerhaave =

Dutch botanist and physician (1668–1738)

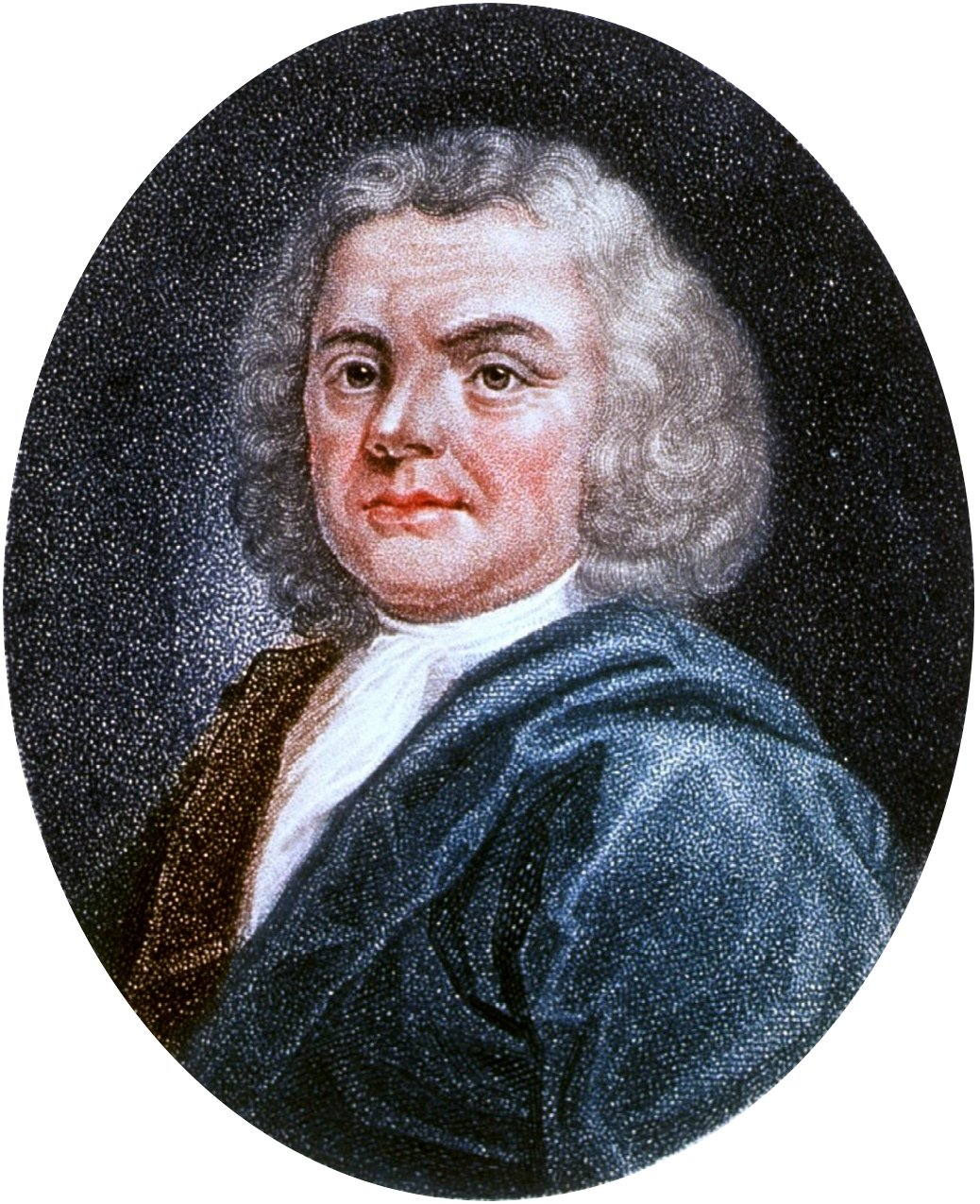
- Born: 31 December 1668; Voorhout, Dutch Republic
- Died: 23 September 1738 (aged 69); Leiden, Dutch Republic
- Resting place: Pieterskerk, Leiden
- Education: University of Leiden (M.A., 1690); University of Harderwijk (M.D., 1693)
- Known for: Founder of clinical teaching
- Scientific career
- Fields: Medicine
- Workplaces: University of Leiden
- Theses: De distinctione mentis a corpore (On the Difference of the Mind from the Body) (1690); De utilitate explorandorum in aegris excrementorum ut signorum (The Utility of Examining Signs of Disease in the Excrement of the Sick) (1693)
- Academic advisors: Burchard de Volder
- Notable students: Gerard van Swieten
- Author abbrev. (botany): Boerh.

Herman Boerhaave (Dutch: [ˈɦɛrmɑm ˈbuːrˌɦaːvə], 31 December 1668 – 23 September 1738) was a Dutch chemist, botanist, Christian humanist, and physician. He is sometimes regarded as the founder of clinical teaching and of the modern academic hospital along with Venetian physician Santorio Santorio (1561–1636). Boerhaave introduced the quantitative approach into medicine, along with his pupil Albrecht von Haller (1708–1777).

He was the first to isolate the chemical urea from urine. He was the first physician to put thermometer measurements to clinical practice. His motto was Simplex veri sigillum: 'Simplicity is the sign of the truth'. He is often hailed as the "Dutch Hippocrates".

== Biography ==
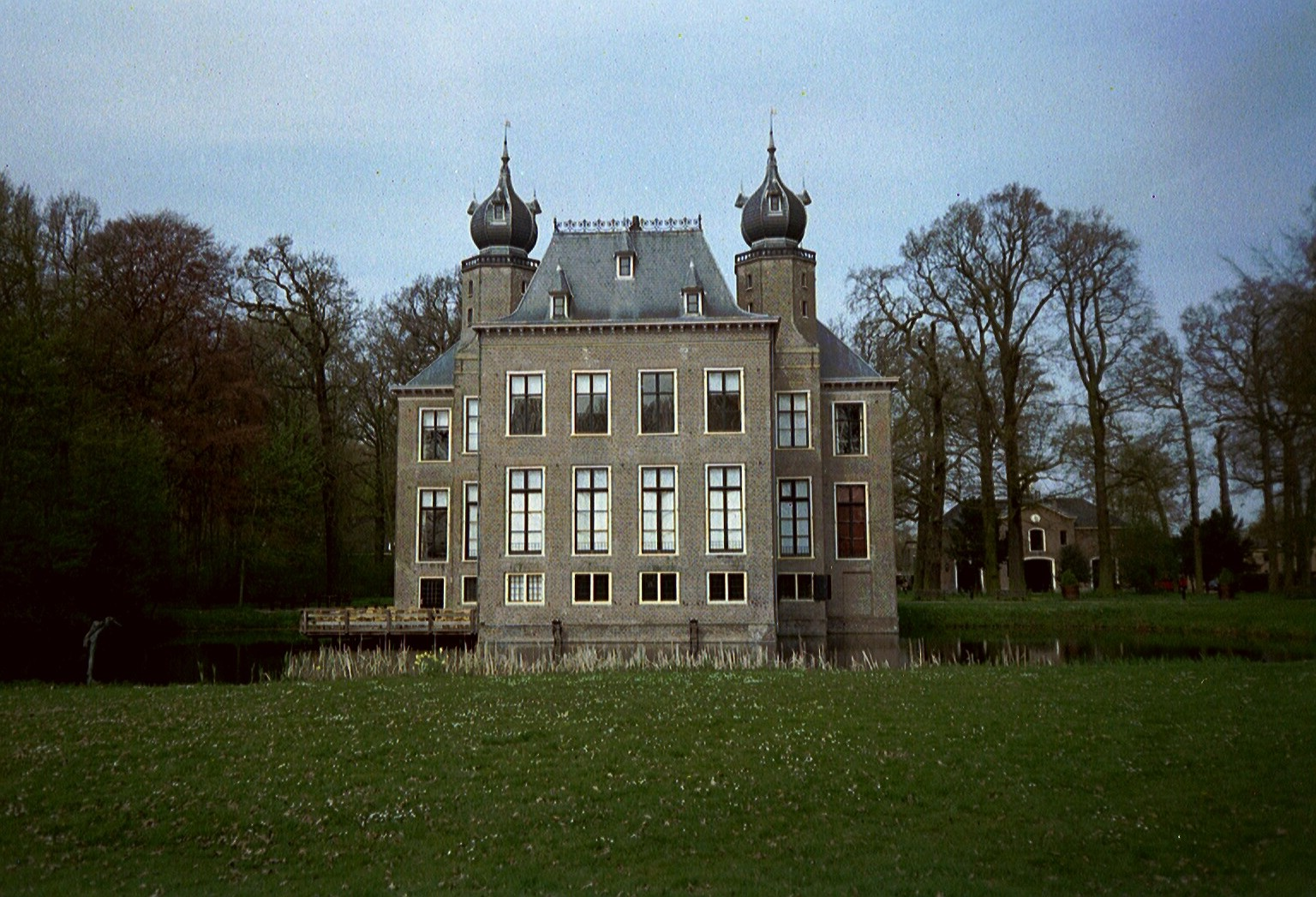
Oud Poelgeest Castle, Herman Boerhaave's home in Oegstgeest, near Leiden. This was the site of his outdoor botanical garden that was renowned during his lifetime and rivalled Hortus Cliffortianus, the garden of his friend and sponsor to Linnaeus. He travelled back and forth to his friend's garden and to the Leiden University by trekschuit (horse-drawn boat).

Boerhaave was born at Voorhout near Leiden. The son of a Protestant pastor, in his youth Boerhaave studied for a divinity degree and wanted to become a preacher. After the death of his father, however, he was offered a scholarship and he entered the University of Leiden, where he took his master's degree in philosophy in 1690, with a dissertation titled De distinctione mentis a corpore (On the Difference of the Mind from the Body). There he attacked the doctrines of Epicurus, Thomas Hobbes and Baruch Spinoza. He then turned to the study of medicine. He earned his medical doctorate from the University of Harderwijk (present-day Gelderland) in 1693, with a dissertation titled De utilitate explorandorum in aegris excrementorum ut signorum (The Utility of Examining Signs of Disease in the Excrement of the Sick).

In 1701 he was appointed lecturer on the institutes of medicine at Leiden; in his inaugural discourse, De commendando Hippocratis studio, he recommended to his pupils that great physician as their model. In 1709 he became professor of botany and medicine, and in that capacity he did good service, not only to his own university, but also to botanical science, by his improvements and additions to the botanic garden of Leiden, and by the publication of numerous works descriptive of new species of plants.

On 14 September 1710, Boerhaave married Maria Drolenvaux (1686–1746), the daughter of the rich merchant, Alderman Abraham Drolenvaux. They had four children, of whom one daughter, Maria Johanna (1712–1791) – wife of German art collector with various influential political ties Frederic Count de Thoms (1696–1746), lived to adulthood. In 1722, he began to suffer from an extreme case of gout, recovering the next year.

In 1714, when he was appointed rector of the university, he succeeded Govert Bidloo in the chair of practical medicine, and in this capacity he introduced the modern system of clinical instruction. Whether he was the first to do so is contested; in the words of one medical historian, Boerhaave "was neither an innovator of this practice, nor an especially energetic practitioner of it", though he did help to popularize the method. Four years later he was appointed to the chair of chemistry as well. In 1728 he was elected into the French Academy of Sciences, and two years later into the Royal Society of London. In 1729 declining health obliged him to resign the chairs of chemistry and botany; and he died, after a lingering and painful illness, at Leiden.

== Legacy ==
His reputation so increased the fame of the University of Leiden, especially as a school of medicine, that it became popular with visitors from every part of Europe. All the princes of Europe sent him pupils, who found in this skilful professor not only an indefatigable teacher, but an affectionate guardian. When Peter the Great went to Holland in 1716 (he had been in Holland before in 1697 to instruct himself in maritime affairs), he also took lessons from Boerhaave. Voltaire travelled to see him, as did Carl Linnaeus, who became a close friend and named the genus Boerhavia for him. In one probably apocryphal story to show the reach of Boerhaave's fame, a man from China sent him a letter addressed only "to Mr. Boerhaave, physician in Europe," and it reached him in due course.

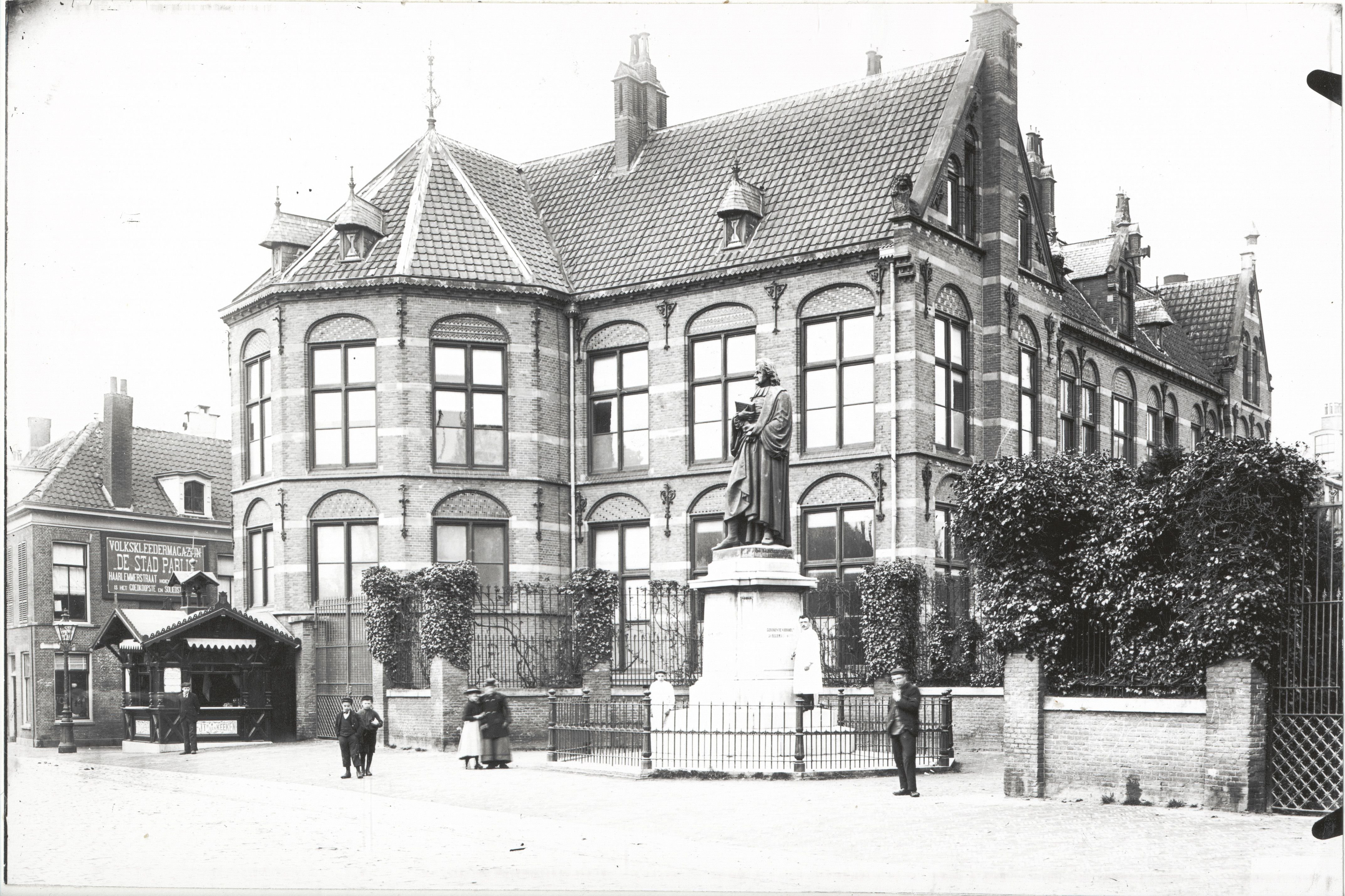
Bronze statue made by J.Stracke (1817–1891)

The operating theatre of the University of Leiden in which he once worked as an anatomist is now at the centre of a museum named after him; the Boerhaave Museum. Asteroid 8175 Boerhaave is named after Boerhaave. From 1955 to 1961 Boerhaave's image was printed on Dutch 20-guilder banknotes. The Leiden University Medical Centre organises medical trainings called Boerhaave-courses.

He had a prodigious influence on the development of medicine and chemistry in Scotland. British medical schools credit Boerhaave for developing the system of medical education upon which their current institutions are based. Every founding member of the Edinburgh Medical School had studied at Leyden and attended Boerhaave's lectures on chemistry including John Rutherford and Francis Home. Boerhaave's Elementa Chemiae (1732) is recognised as the first text on chemistry.

Boerhaave first described Boerhaave syndrome, which involves tearing of the oesophagus, usually a consequence of vigorous vomiting. Notoriously, in 1724 he described the case of Baron Jan van Wassenaer, a Dutch admiral who died of this condition following a gluttonous feast and subsequent regurgitation. The condition was uniformly fatal prior to modern surgical techniques allowing repair of the oesophagus.

Boerhaave was critical of his Dutch contemporary Baruch Spinoza, attacking him in his 1688 dissertation. At the same time, he admired Isaac Newton and was a devout Christian who often wrote about God in his works. A collection of his religious thoughts on medicine, translated from Latin to English, has been compiled by the Sir Thomas Browne Instituut Leiden under the name Boerhaave's Orations (meaning "Boerhaave's Prayers"). Among other things, he considered nature as God's Creation, and he used to say that the poor were his best patients because God was their paymaster.

== Medical contributions ==
Boerhaave devoted himself intensively to the study of the human body. He was strongly influenced by the mechanistic theories of René Descartes, and those of the 17th-century astronomer and mathematician Giovanni Borelli, who described animal movements in terms of mechanical motion. On such premises Boerhaave proposed a hydraulic model of human physiology. His writings refer to simple machines such as levers and pulleys and similar mechanisms, and he saw the bodily organs and members as being assembled from pipe-like structures. The physiology of veins, for example, he compared to the operation of pipes. He asserted the importance of a proper balance of fluid pressure, noting that fluids should be able to move around the body freely, without obstacles. For its well-being the body needed to be self-regulating, so as to maintain a healthy state of equilibrium. Boerhaave's concept of the body as apparatus centred his medical attention on material problems rather than upon ontological or esoteric explanations of illness.

Boerhaave's teaching of his knowledge and philosophy drew many students to the University of Leiden. He emphasised the importance of anatomical research based on practical observation and scientific experiment. His concept of the bodily system took hold throughout Europe, and helped to transform medical education in the European schools. His insights aroused great interest among other critical medical thinkers, not least in Friedrich Hoffmann, who strongly advocated the importance of physico-mechanical principles for the preservation or indeed the restoration of health. As a professor at Leiden, Boerhaave influenced many students. Some in their experiments upheld and furthered his philosophy, while others rejected it and proposed alternative theories of human physiology. He produced a great many textbooks and writings through which the digested brilliance of his lectures at Leiden was circulated widely in Europe. In 1708 his publication of the Institutiones Medicae was issued in over five languages, and went into approximately ten editions. His Elementa Chemia, a world-renowned chemistry textbook, was published in 1732.

The mechanistic concept of the human body departed from the age-old precepts laid down by Galen and Aristotle. In place of a servile dependence upon teachings handed down from antiquity, Boerhaave understood the importance of establishing definitive findings through his own investigation, and by the direct application of his own methods of testing. This new reasoning expanded the field of Renaissance anatomy: it opened the way to reforms of medical practice and understanding in the field of iatrochemistry.

== Works ==
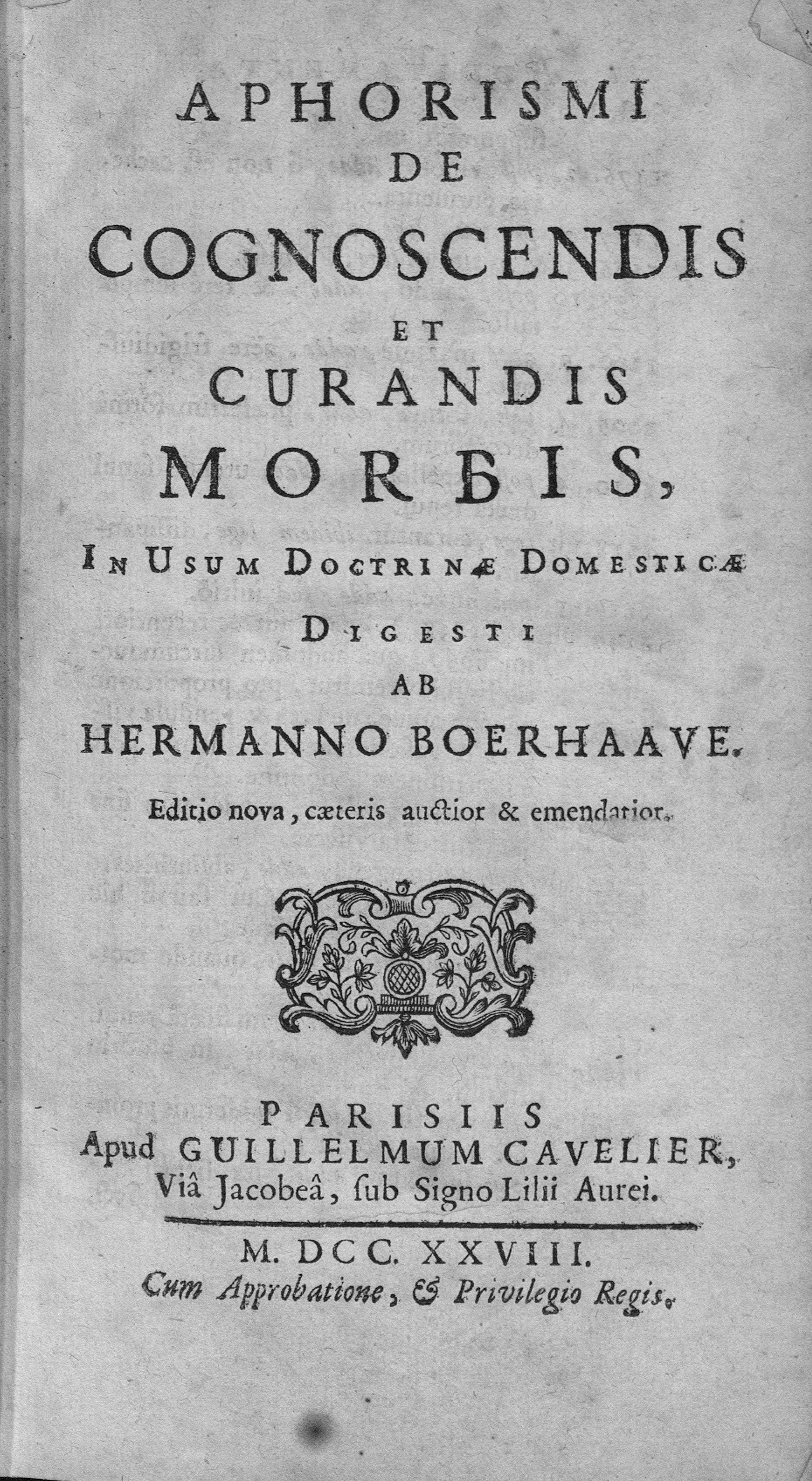
Aphorismi de cognoscendis et curandis morbis, 1728

- Oratio academica qua probatur, bene intellectam a Cicerone et confutatam esse sententiam Epicuri de summo bono (Leiden, 1688)
- Het Nut der Mechanistische Methode in de Geneeskunde (Leiden, 1703)
- Institutiones medicae (Leiden, 1708)
- Aphorismi de cognoscendis et curandis morbis (Leiden, 1709), on which his pupil and assistant, Gerard van Swieten (1700–1772) published a commentary in 5 vols.
  - Aphorismi de cognoscendis et curandis morbis (in Latin). Parisiis. 1728 – via apud Guillelmum Cavelier, via Jacobea, sub signo Lilii aurei.
- Index plantarum quae in Horto academico Lugduno Batavo reperiuntur (in Latin). Leiden: Cornelis Boutesteyn. 1710.
- Index alter plantarum quae in horto academico Lugduno-Batavo aluntur (in Latin). Vol. 1. Leiden: Pieter van der Aa (1.). 1720.
  - Index alter plantarum quae in horto academico Lugduno-Batavo aluntur (in Latin). Vol. 2. Leiden: Pieter van der Aa (1.). 1720.
- Institutiones et Experimenta chemiae (Paris, 1724) (unauthorised). (Digital edition by the University and State Library Düsseldorf)
- Historia plantarum quae in Horto Academico Lugduni-Batavorum crescunt (in Latin). Roma: Francesco Gonzaga. 1727.
- Elementa chemiae (in Latin). Vol. 1. Leiden: Severinus, Isaak. 1732.
  - Elements of Chemistry. Vol. 1. London: Pemberton, J and J. 1735. Translated from the original Latin by Timothy Dallowe, MD.
  - Elementa chemiae (in Latin). Vol. 2. Leiden: Severinus, Isaak. 1732.
- Historia plantarum quae in Horto Academico Lugduni-Batavorum crescunt (in Latin). Vol. 1. Amsterdam. 1738.
  - Historia plantarum quae in Horto Academico Lugduni-Batavorum crescunt (in Latin). Vol. 2. Amsterdam. 1738.
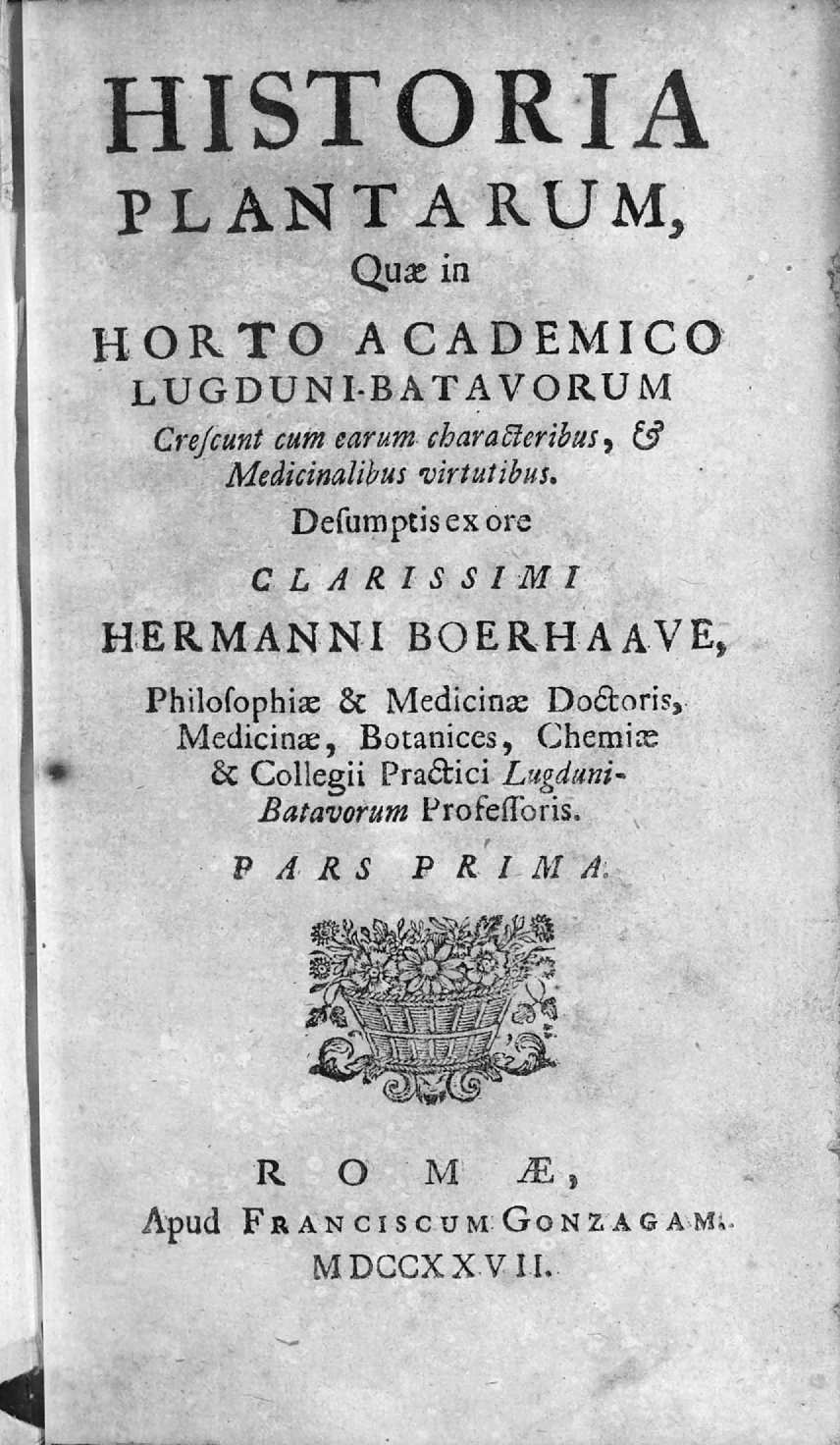
Historia plantarum quae in Horto Academico Lugduni-Batavorum crescunt, 1727

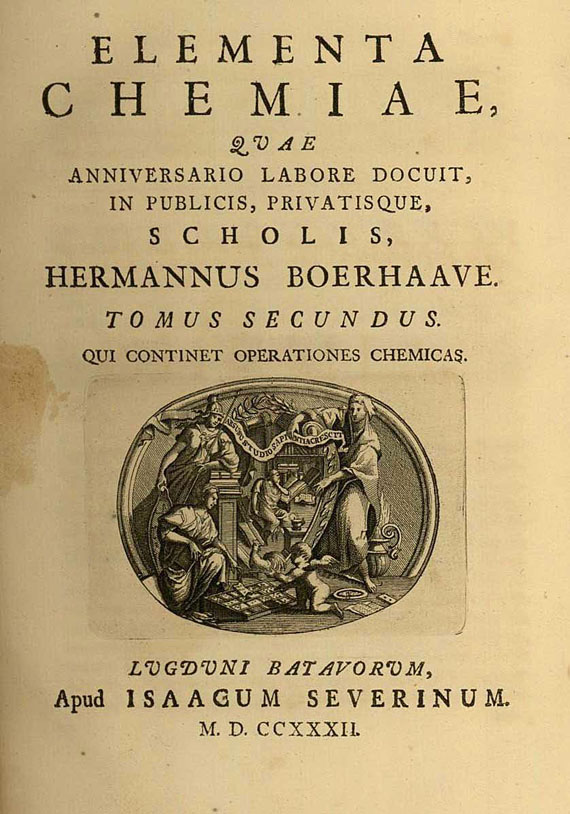
Elementa Chemiae, 1732
