= Susan Riechert =

American behavioral ecologist (born 1945)

- Born: Susan Elise Riechert; October 20, 1945 (age 80)
- Education: University of Wisconsin–Madison.
- Known for: Behavior of spiders, evolutionary game theory
- Scientific career
- Fields: Behavioral ecologist
- Workplaces: The University of Tennessee, Knoxville

Susan Elise Riechert (born October 20, 1945) is an American behavioral ecologist known for her research in evolutionary biology, evolutionary game theory and the behavior of spiders. She is also known for her "biology in a box" teaching materials, used by hundreds of thousands of elementary and secondary school students in Tennessee.

Until her retirement in 2020, Riechert worked at the University of Tennessee as UTK Distinguished Service Professor and as UTK Chancellors Professor of Ecology & Evolutionary Biology. She was president of the American Arachnological Society for 1983–1985, and president of the Animal Behavior Society in 1997.

== Early life and education ==
Riechert lost much of her hearing through scarlet fever as a child. Her interest in spider behavior began through a field zoology class at the University of Wisconsin–Madison. After nearly drowning trying to catch fish for the class, she switched to a subject that was safer to catch, spiders. Her interest was further piqued after she observed a large population of spiders exhibiting territorial behaviors that only vertebrates were thought to be capable of at the time. Research that she conducted based on this interest would lead to her to publish her "seminal work","Games Spiders Play," in 1978.

Riechert earned a B.A. in 1967, an M.A. in 1970, and a Ph.D. in 1973, all at the University of Wisconsin–Madison.

== Career and Research ==
Knox News described Riechert as "something of a pioneer - one of the first women to enter her field as an independent researcher."

Of particular note is the fact that several of her studies were focused on the effect that variations in a species had on the behavior of its members. In 1988, she and Peter Hammerstein conducted a study that led her to hypothesize that riparian populations of Agelenopsis aperta could not fully adapt to their new environs because of gene flow from non-riparian populations of the species that lived nearby. In 1989, Riechert co-authored a paper titled "Genetically-based variation between two spider populations in foraging behavior," in which she and fellow arachnologist Ann Hendrick discussed how genetic differences in the population of one species can have an impact on the way they search for food.

Members of the genus Agelenopsis (American grass spiders) featured prominently in Riechert's work, particularly the species Agelenopsis Aperta. Riechert's focus as a behavioral arachnologist led her to examine both the genetic and non-genetic reasons behind these spiders' behaviors in various areas, such as feeding, maturation, and mating. The genus was, in fact, the topic of "Games Spiders Play," a landmark contribution by Riechert to behavioral arachnology. Riechert demonstrated that the aforementioned spiders engaged in territorial disputes similar to those seen in much larger creatures. Most spiders are not social animals, so this behavior was unexpected at the time. Riechert's analysis would cement her place in the behavioral arachnology community.

== Recognition ==
The Animal Behavior Society elected Riechert as a fellow in 1993. In 2008, Riechert was named a Fellow of the American Association for the Advancement of Science, "for distinguished contributions to the field of behavior and ecology". She won the Southeastern Conference Faculty Achievement Award for 2016. The Animal Behavior Society gave Riechert their 2018 Penny Bernstein Distinguished Teaching Award. A festschrift symposium, sponsored by the Animal Behavior Society, was held in her honor in 2020.

== Notable associates ==
Jonathan Pruitt achieved a PhD with Riechert as his advisor and was able to attain prestigious positions in academia despite his youth thanks to his acclaimed publications. However, the validity and truthfulness of his research data was called into question in 2020. Since then, many of the papers Pruitt co-authored based on his data have been retracted, others called into question, and papers from other authors which cited Pruitt's compromised papers have had to have been corrected and updated. In November 2021, University of Tennessee Knoxville removed Pruitt's dissertation from its library. Riechert said she was "devastated" by the news, but added that if Pruitt had truly falsified data, he had to "pay the price".

== Selected publications ==
- Riechert, Susan (January 6, 1978). "Games spiders play: Behavioral variability in territorial disputes". Behavioral Ecology and Sociobiology. 3 (2): 135–162. doi:10.1007/BF00294986. S2CID 45368088.
- Riechert, Susan E. (1979). "Games Spiders Play: II. Resource Assessment Strategies". Behavioral Ecology and Sociobiology. 6 (2): 121–128. doi:10.1007/BF00292558. ISSN 0340-5443. JSTOR 4599267. S2CID 24952392.
- Riechert, S E; Hammerstein, P (November 1983). "Game Theory in the Ecological Context". Annual Review of Ecology and Systematics. 14 (1): 377–409. doi:10.1146/annurev.es.14.110183.002113. ISSN 0066-4162.
- Riechert, S E; Lockley, T (January 1984). "Spiders as Biological Control Agents". Annual Review of Entomology. 29 (1): 299–320. doi:10.1146/annurev.en.29.010184.001503. ISSN 0066-4170.
- Hammerstein, Peter; Riechert, Susan E. (April 1988). "Payoffs and strategies in territorial contests: ESS analyses of two ecotypes of the spider Agelenopsis aperta". Evolutionary Ecology. 2 (2): 115–138. doi:10.1007/BF02067272. S2CID 24036435.
- Hendrick, Ann; Riechert, Susan (September 1, 1989). "Genetically-based variation between two spider populations in foraging behavior". Oecologia. 80 (4): 533–539. Bibcode:1989Oecol..80..533H. doi:10.1007/BF00380078. PMID 28312840. S2CID 2781570.
- Riechert, SE; Bishop, L (1990). "Prey control by an assemblage of generalist predators: spiders in garden test systems". Ecology. 71 (4): 1441–1450. doi:10.2307/1938281. JSTOR 1938281.
- Riechert, Susan E. (1 January 1993). "The Evolution of Behavioral Phenotypes: Lessons Learned from Divergent Spider Populations". Advances in the Study of Behavior. 22. Academic Press: 103–134. doi:10.1016/s0065-3454(08)60406-4. ISBN 9780120045228.
- Maupin, Jennifer; Riechert, Susan (September 9, 2001). "Superfluous killing in spiders: A consequence of adaptation to food-limited environments?". Behavioral Ecology. 12 (5): 569–576. doi:10.1093/beheco/12.5.569.
- Riechert, Susan; Johns, Phillip (July 1, 2003). "Do female spiders select heavier males for the genes or behavioral aggressiveness they offer their offspring?". Evolution. 57 (6): 67–73. doi:10.1554/02-677. S2CID 198155929.
- Ayoub, Nadia; Riechert, Susan (December 1, 2004). "Molecular evidence for Pleistocene glacial cycles driving diversification of a North American desert spider, Agelenopsis aperta". Molecular Ecology. 13 (11): 34–65. doi:10.1111/j.1365-294X.2004.02335.x. PMID 15488003. S2CID 22979035.
- Becker, Elizabeth; Riechert, Susan; Singer, Fred (January 1, 2005). "Male induction of female quiescence/catalepsis during courtship in the spider, Agelenopsis aperta". Behaviour. 142 (1): 57–70. doi:10.1163/1568539053627767.
- Riechert, Susan; Bosco, Jennifer; O'Meara, Brian (July 3, 2017). "The ontogeny of personality traits in the desert funnel-web spider, Agelenopsis lisa (Araneae: Agelenidae)". Ethology. 123 (9): 648–658. doi:10.1111/eth.12639.
- Riechert, Susan; Pruitt, Jonathan; Bosco, Jennifer (November 1, 2017). "In the spider nursery: Indifference, cooperation, or antagonism?". Journal of Arachnology. 45 (3): 283–286. doi:10.1636/JoA-S-16-068.1. S2CID 89871930.
