= Diederik Stapel =

Dutch social psychologist and research fraudster (born 1966)

Diederik Alexander Stapel (born 19 October 1966) is a Dutch former professor of social psychology at Tilburg University. In 2011 Tilburg University suspended Stapel for fabricating and manipulating data for his research publications. This scientific misconduct took place over a number of years and affected dozens of his publications. By 2015, fifty-eight of Stapel's publications had been retracted. He has been described in coverage by the New York Times as "the biggest con man in academic science".

== Early life ==
Stapel was born in the village of Oegstgeest, near Leiden, the youngest of four children. His father worked as a civil engineer.

After completing his schooling, Stapel studied drama and media studies at East Stroudsburg University in Pennsylvania before moving back to the Netherlands for an undergraduate degree in psychology. Stapel obtained an MA degree in psychology and communication science from the University of Amsterdam in 1991. From the same university he obtained his PhD cum laude in social psychology in 1997; his dissertation was on assimilation and contrast effects. Before embarking on his doctoral research, in 1991–1992, Stapel returned to the US for study, undertaking a program on behavioral decision making at the University of Chicago's Graduate School of Business.

He married in 1997.

== Career ==
After gaining his doctorate, Stapel continued at UvA as a fellow of the Royal Netherlands Academy of Arts and Sciences (KNAW) for three years. Stapel became a professor at the University of Groningen in 2000 and moved to Tilburg University in 2006, where he cofounded TiBER, the Tilburg Institute for Behavioral Economics Research. In September 2010, Stapel became dean of the social and behavioral sciences faculty.

Stapel received the Career Trajectory Award from the Society of Experimental Social Psychology in 2009, which has since been retracted. He voluntarily surrendered his PhD title to the University of Amsterdam in November 2011, noting that his "behavior of the past years [is] inconsistent with the duties associated with the doctorate." This action was taken into account in the decision of Dutch prosecutors to not pursue criminal actions.

== Scientific misconduct ==
=== Investigations ===
In September 2011, Tilburg University suspended Stapel due to his fabrication of data used in research publications. The university announced an investigation of his work.

On 31 October 2011, a committee entrusted with investigating "the extent and nature of the breach of scientific integrity committed by Mr D.A. Stapel", formed by the Rector Magnificus of Tilburg University and chaired by Willem ("Pim") Levelt, published an interim report regarding Stapel's activities at the three Dutch universities where he had worked.

Stapel provided the investigating committees with a list of his publications that contained fictitious data, acknowledging that it may not be complete.

An extensive report analyzes all 130 of Stapel's articles and twenty-four book chapters. A website was set up on 27 March 2012 to publish interim findings. According to the first findings, out of an initial batch of twenty Stapel publications studied by the Levelt committee, twelve journal articles were fabricated and three contributions to books were also fraudulent. The Dutch newspaper de Volkskrant reported that the final report was due on 28 November 2012, and that a book by Stapel was to be released around the same time.

"We have some 30 papers in peer-reviewed journals where we are actually sure that they are fake, and there are more to come," Pim Levelt, chair of the committee investigating Stapel's work said in a media statement.

=== Suspicions raised ===
The Levelt joint committees' reports acknowledged three unnamed young Tilburg University researchers as the whistleblowers for the case. They had become suspicious when one noticed anomalous data in a set received from Stapel. Subsequent discussion with the teacher did not allay their concerns. During a research meeting where Stapel presented data for a new study, the data fitted the hypothesis so perfectly that someone joked "It is as if he made up these data himself." The three found an entire row of scores appearing identically in two studies, which strongly suggested fraud. After the students approached the head of the Department of Social Psychology, Marcel Zeelenberg, he brought the complaint to rector magnificus Philip Eijlander. Official investigations were set in motion within days by Tilburg University, which were soon joined by the UvA and the University of Groningen. Stapel claimed that the data was collected by his contacts in schools. When the rector asked Stapel for those contacts, Stapel said the schools did not actually exist. This was the smoking gun.

The Levelt report also noted two professors who claim they had previously seen examples of Stapel's data that were "too good to be true."

=== Methods ===
Stapel controlled the data in his lab: when students asked to see the raw data, they were often given excuses. There were occasions when Stapel's data were given to an assistant to be entered into a computer. This assistant would then return the data file to Stapel. The researcher analyzing the data would then receive the file directly from Stapel.

Curiosity regarding datasets was discouraged by Stapel and, at times, persistent or perceptive questioning would be met with apparent hostility. In one case the Levelt committee reports, a PhD student who was querying unusual data was told by Stapel: "If you want to be taken on here you will have to demonstrate that you can get something finished, so just write up the results." Several PhD students told the investigation that they had been pressured into silence by Stapel's untoward use of his power over them.

As his process for fraudulent research developed, by his Tilburg years his general method was to formulate in full all the elements of a proposed study – an experiment, with its theoretical grounding, the hypotheses, methods, stimuli, questionnaires, and even participants' rewards – and then create the fictitious data which he would then provide to colleagues and students for further analysis. He would pretend to run the experiments with the help of unnamed research assistants. Instead of doing so, he would make up the data. A plausible explanation would be offered for excluding others from data collection. For example, several experiments were to be run in schools; Stapel made it known that he had access to these by special arrangements which would be endangered by involving other researchers. The purported schools preferred to deal with Stapel alone, whom they knew and trusted and would be bothered by having additional, unknown researchers involved. Earlier in his career, going back at least to 2004, rather than faking data, the investigations found he appears to have manipulated data —for example, by simply altering numerals in the recorded outcome measures, so that the calculated means of scores for the contrasted experimental conditions would appear to differ, in support of his tested hypothesis.

Stapel's supply of pre-collected data to his graduate students was noted as being atypical for masters students and PhD candidates, but was presented by Stapel as an advantage to them, which they did perceive as helpful and even a luxury. This process, even apart from the fraudulent data, was inappropriate, with most of the students graduating without ever actually completing an experiment.

Stapel's scientific misconduct went undetected for at least fifteen years. The Levelt report concludes that his academic reputation was, in part, the reason his illicit activities were able to continue for such a length of time. At Tilburg he was considered a leading researcher with a high profile both in academic psychology and in the popular media in the Netherlands. His colleagues and students generally viewed him positively. The report says he had a reputation as being "charismatic, friendly and incredibly talented". Many students became his personal friends.

=== Findings ===
On 28 November 2012, the final joint report, from the three investigating committees, was published.

The interim report concluded that Stapel falsified or fabricated data for at least 30 publications. When the final report was released, that number had risen to fifty-five. They were unable to determine whether Stapel fabricated or manipulated data for his 1997 dissertation at the University of Amsterdam (UvA), because the data had been destroyed, in common with data for much of Stapel's earlier work. The university announced that it would investigate whether it would be possible to retract Stapel's PhD because of exceptionally unworthy scientific behavior.

The interim report stated that Stapel had caused severe damage to young people at the beginning of their careers, as well as to the general confidence in science, in particular social psychology. The University of Tilburg announced that it would pursue criminal prosecution of Stapel.

Despite being critical of an overarching shortfall in collective academic responsibility, the investigating committees emphasized that Stapel acted alone in all cases of known misconduct. The report found no indication that any coauthors, PhD students, or others were aware of the fraudulent conduct. The reports did suggest that the data were in some instances so unusual that suspicion may have been reasonable. The interim report names 19 theses prepared with data delivered by Stapel. Of those, seven have been cleared. There are various degrees of suspicion about the remaining twelve. The report advised that the degrees of the students involved should not be retracted.

=== Prosecution settlement ===
In June 2013 Stapel agreed, in a settlement with the prosecutor, to perform 120 hours of community service and to lose the right to some benefits associated with his former job equivalent to a year and a half's worth of salary. In this way, he avoided further criminal prosecution.

== Reaction ==
=== Stapel response ===
Responding to the interim report, Stapel stated: (Note: A longer excerpt from Stapel's response to the joint committees' interim report, in the original Dutch with English translation, follows: Het is moeilijk de juiste woorden te vinden. De commissie heeft gesproken. En nu moet ik en wil ik iets zeggen, hoe onmogelijk het ook is het juiste te zeggen. Ik heb gefaald als wetenschapper, als onderzoeker. Ik heb onderzoeksgegevens aangepast en onderzoeken gefingeerd. Niet een keer, maar meerdere keren, en niet even, maar gedurende een langere tijd. Ik realiseer me dat ik door dit gedrag mijn directe collega's in verbijstering en boosheid heb achtergelaten en mijn vakgebied, de sociale psychologie, in een kwaad daglicht heb gesteld. Ik schaam me daarvoor en ik heb daar grote spijt van. [...] Ik hecht er aan te benadrukken dat ik hen nooit op de hoogte heb gebracht van mijn oneigenlijk gedrag. Ik bied mijn collega's, mijn promovendi en de gehele academische gemeenschap mijn oprechte excuses aan. Ik ben me bewust van het leed en het verdriet dat ik bij hen heb veroorzaakt. — Excerpt of statement by Diederik Stapel (31 October 2011), reported in Brabants Dagblad Translation: It's hard to find the right words. The committee has spoken. And now I have to and want to say something, no matter how impossible it is to say the right thing. I have manipulated research data and faked studies. Not once, but several times, not for a short period, but over a longer period of time. I realize that by this behavior I have left my immediate colleagues bewildered and angry and have put my field of study, social psychology, in a bad light. I'm ashamed of that and I deeply regret it. [...] I would like to emphasize that I never informed them of my improper behavior. I sincerely apologize to my colleagues, my PhD students and the entire academic community. I am aware of the suffering and sadness I have caused them. — Translation from the Dutch (machine translation))

I have failed as a scientist, as a researcher. I have manipulated research data and faked studies. Not once, but several times, not for a short period, but over a longer period of time. I realize that by this behavior I have left my immediate colleagues bewildered and angry and have put my field of study, social psychology, in a bad light. I'm ashamed of that and I deeply regret it. ... it is important to emphasize that I never informed my colleagues of my inappropriate behavior. I offer my colleagues, my PhD students, and the complete academic community my sincere apologies. I am aware of the suffering and sorrow that I caused to them ...

In his memoirs published in November 2012, Stapel admits his fraud, but protests against the accusation in the interim report that he was a cunning, manipulative fraud with a plan.

=== In academia ===
In a review for the Association for Psychological Science's Observer, Stapel's Ontsporing ('Derailment'), a book-length memoir, is described by Dutch psychologists Denny Borsboom and Eric-Jan Wagenmakers as "revealing". In the work, Stapel recounts that his transgressions began when he was sitting alone in his office and changed "an unexpected 2 into a 4". The reviewers suggest the memoir may provide insights into systemic failures within research science, saying that in his account of the affair, "Stapel appears to underscore the conclusions from the Levelt committee" in this regard. On their reading, there are also the personal frailties that contributed to the fraud on show: They call it a "... a captivating book, even as it is transparently self-serving. On a personal level, it is an emotional account of a fraudster's insecurities, fears, and self-hatred." The reviewers describe the final chapter of the book as "unexpectedly beautiful" but consider that many of its lines are "copied" from the works of writers Raymond Carver and James Joyce, without due acknowledgement. Borsboom and Wagenmakers reviewed the Dutch language edition; the English translation of Stapel's Ontsporing by Nicholas J. L. Brown includes a note regarding "Chapter 10 ½":

This last chapter is my own reinterpretation of some of the final lines of Raymond Carver's poem "The Gift" (from the collection Ultramarine, 1986, Random House, New York), into which I have also woven a couple of lines from the ending of James Joyce's story "The Dead" (from The Dubliners, 1990, Bantam Classics, New York). The title of the chapter is a reference to the chapter entitled "Parenthesis" in Julian Barnes's novel The History of the World in 10 ½ Chapters (1989, Jonathan Cape, London).

— Diederik Stapel (2016). Appendix, Faking Science

== Withdrawn publications ==
=== Retraction overview ===
By December 2015, Retraction Watch reported that Stapel had 58 retracted publications, including journal articles and book chapters. This total number of retractions still stands as of 2023. These are listed in the table below:

Complete list of retracted publications
Title	Year of publication	Journal (Book)	DOI and link to the retraction notice
Interpretation versus Reference Framing: Assimilation and Contrast Effects in the Organizational Domain	1998	Organizational Behavior and Human Decision Processes	10.1016/j.obhdp.2015.11.002
Correction or comparison? The effects of prime awareness on social judgments	2009	European Journal of Social Psychology	10.1002/ejsp.2173
The impact of comprehension versus self-enhancement goals on group perception	2008	Social Psychology	10.1027/1864-9335/a000152
Measure by measure: When implicit and explicit social comparison effects differ	2010	Self and Identity	10.1080/15298868.2013.790597
Unfinished business: How completeness affects the impact of emotional states and emotion concepts on social judgement	2006	Journal of Experimental Social Psychology	10.1016/j.jesp.2013.03.006
Hardly thinking about close and distant others: On cognitive business and target closeness in social comparison effects	2005	Journal of Experimental Social Psychology	10.1016/j.jesp.2013.03.005
The flexible unconscious: Investigating the judgmental impact of varieties of unaware perception	2005	Journal of Experimental Social Psychology	10.1016/j.jesp.2013.03.004
Distinctiveness is Key: How Different Types of Self-Other Similarity Moderate Social Comparison Effects	2007	Personality & Social Psychology Bulletin	10.1177/0146167212474240
Terror Management and Stereotyping: Why Do People Stereotype When Mortality Is Salient?	2008	Personality & Social Psychology Bulletin	10.1177/0146167212474240
When we wonder what it all means: Interpretation goals facilitate accessibility and stereotyping effects	2001	Personality & Social Psychology Bulletin	10.1177/0146167212474240
The effects of diffuse and distinct affect	2002	Journal of Personality and Social Psychology	10.1037/a0031698
Me tomorrow, the others later: How perspective fit increases sustainable behavior	2010	Journal of Environmental Psychology	10.1016/j.jenvp.2012.12.004
Similarities and Differences between the Impact of Traits and Expectancies: What Matters Is Whether the Target Stimulus Is Ambiguous or Mixed	2002	Journal of Experimental Social Psychology	10.1016/j.jesp.2012.12.001
Information to go: Fluency enhances the usability of primed information	2009	Journal of Experimental Social Psychology	10.1016/j.jesp.2012.11.014
Distinguishing stereotype threat from priming effects: on the role of the social self and threat-based concerns	2006	Journal of Personality and Social Psychology	10.1037/a0031270
From seeing to being: subliminal social comparisons affect implicit and explicit self-evaluations	2004	Journal of Personality and Social Psychology	10.1037/a0031410
Method matters: effects of explicit versus implicit social comparisons on activation, behavior, and self-views	2004	Journal of Personality and Social Psychology	10.1037/a0031425
The magic spell of language: linguistic categories and their perceptual consequences	2007	Journal of Personality and Social Psychology	10.1037/a0031271
The self salience model of other-to-self effects: integrating principles of self-enhancement, complementarity, and imitation	2006	Journal of Personality and Social Psychology	10.1037/a0031426
Unconscious and spontaneous and...complex: the three selves model of social comparison assimilation and contrast	2008	Journal of Personality and Social Psychology	10.1037/a0031266
The Norm-Activating Power of Celebrity: The Dynamics of Success and Influence	2011	Social Psychology Quarterly	10.1177/0190272512471170
The downside of feeling better: Self-regard repair harms performance	2008	Self and Identity	10.1080/15298868.2012.742330
Status concerns and financial debts in adolescents	2010	Social Influence	10.1080/15534510.2012.738953
It's all in the timing: Measuring emotional reactions to stereotype threat before and after taking a test	2006	European Journal of Social Psychology	10.1002/ejsp.1919
Making sense of war: using the interpretation comparison model to understand the Iraq conflict	2006	European Journal of Social Psychology	10.1002/ejsp.1920
Staff, miter, book, share: how attributes of Saint Nicholas induce normative behavior	2008	European Journal of Social Psychology	10.1002/ejsp.1913
Affects of the unexpected: when inconsistency feels good (or bad)	2010	Personality & Social Psychology Bulletin	10.1177/0146167212462821
Event Accessibility and Context Effects in Causal Inference: Judgment of a Different Order	1996	Personality & Social Psychology Bulletin	10.1177/0146167212462821
Silence and Table Manners: When Environments Activate Norms	2008	Personality & Social Psychology Bulletin	10.1177/0146167212462821
The influence of mood on attribution	2010	Personality & Social Psychology Bulletin	10.1177/0146167212462821
Why people stereotype affects how they stereotype: the differential influence of comprehension goals and self-enhancement goals on stereotyping	2009	Personality & Social Psychology Bulletin	10.1177/0146167212462821
Stop Making Sense: The Ultimate Fear	2009	Psychological Inquiry	10.1080/1047840X.2012.722053
Behavioural effects of automatic interpersonal versus intergroup social comparison	2006	British Journal of Social Psychology	10.1348/014466605X79589
How to heat up from the cold: examining the preconditions for (unconscious) mood effects	2008	Journal of Personality and Social Psychology	10.1037/a0029740
Mood and context-dependence: Positive mood increases and negative mood decreases the effects of context on perception	2010	Journal of Personality and Social Psychology	10.1037/a0029743
Moods as spotlights: the influence of mood on accessibility effects	2008	Journal of Personality and Social Psychology	10.1037/a0029742
No pain, no gain: the conditions under which upward comparisons lead to better performance	2007	Journal of Personality and Social Psychology	10.1037/a0029731
On models and vases: body dissatisfaction and proneness to social comparison effects	2007	Journal of Personality and Social Psychology	10.1037/a0029732
The referents of trait inferences: The impact of trait concepts versus actor–trait links on subsequent judgments	1996	Journal of Personality and Social Psychology	10.1037/a0029744
What drives self-affirmation effects? On the importance of differentiating value affirmation and attribute affirmation	2011	Journal of Personality and Social Psychology	10.1037/a0029745
Beauty as a tool: The effect of model attractiveness, product relevance, and elaboration likelihood on advertising effectiveness	2010	Psychology & Marketing	10.1002/mar.20565
When different is better: Performance following upward comparison	2006	European Journal of Social Psychology	10.1002/ejsp.1903
The unconscious unfolding of emotions	2009	European Review of Social Psychology	10.1080/10463283.2012.705989
Emotion elicitor or emotion messenger? Subliminal priming reveals two faces of facial expressions	2008	Psychological Science	10.1177/0956797612453137
Judging the unexpected: Disconfirmation of situation-specific expectancies	2009	European Journal of Social Psychology	10.1002/ejsp.1898
Racist biases in legal decisions are reduced by a justice focus	2010	European Journal of Social Psychology	10.1002/ejsp.1897
The secret life of emotions	2008	Psychological Science	10.1177/0956797612453137
When nothing compares to me: How defensive motivations and similarity shape social comparison effects	2006	European Journal of Social Psychology	10.1002/ejsp.1899
The Self-Activation Effect of Advertisements: Ads Can Affect Whether and How Consumers Think about the Self	2010	Journal of Consumer Research	10.1086/667237
It depends on how you look at it: being versus becoming mindsets determine responses to social comparisons	2010	British Journal of Social Psychology	10.1111/j.2044-8309.2012.02111.x
The Effects of Different Types of Self–Activation on Social Comparison Orientation	2006	Social Cognition	10.1521/soco.2006.24.6.703
The Mental Roots of System Justification: System Threat, Need for Structure, and Stereotyping	2011	Social Cognition	10.1521/soco.2012.30.3.363
When failure feels better than success: Self-salience, self-consistency, and affect	2011	British Journal of Social Psychology	10.1111/j.2044-8309.2012.02108.x
Stereotype Disconfirmation Affect: When Sweet Hooligans Make You Happy and Honest Salesmen Make You Sad	2011	Basic and Applied Social Psychology	10.1080/01973533.2012.682012
What's in a Name? 361.708 Euros: The Effects of Marital Name Change	2010	Basic and Applied Social Psychology	10.1080/01973533.2012.682012
Happiness as alchemy: Positive mood leads to self-serving responses to social comparisons	2011	Motivation and Emotion	10.1007/s11031-011-9266-1
Coping with Chaos: How Disordered Contexts Promote Stereotyping and Discrimination	2011	Science	10.1126/science.334.6060.1202-a
From (Unconscious) Perception to Emotion: A Global-to-Specific Unfolding View of Emotional Responding	2010	Chapter 4 in: (Emotion Regulation and Well-Being)	10.1007/978-1-4419-6953-8_20

=== Chapters in edited books ===
Several chapters written or coauthored by Stapel in reference books were called into question in the Flawed Science report. The Levelt committee noted fraud in three chapters in academic books, each listed with the note: "Theoretical article, in important respect based on fraudulent articles"; they regarded the evidence in these cases sufficient to conclude "fraud established". One of these chapters was subject to a formal retraction notice in the academic press and is included in Retraction Watch's database. The three chapters are listed in the table below:

List of book chapters with "fraud established"
Chapter title	Year	Editors	Publisher	Book	Notes	ISBN (Pages)
"In the mind of the beholder: The interpretation comparison model of accessibility effects"	2007	D.A. Stapel; J. Suls	Psychology Press	Assimilation and Contrast in Social Psychology		(313–327)
"Priming as proxy: Understanding the subjectivity of social life"	2011	K. C. Klauer; A. Voss; C. Stahl	Guilford Publications	Cognitive Methods in Social Psychology	Republished 2012 in abridged form with Stapel chapter excised.	ISBN 978-1-4625-0913-3 (148–183)
"From (Unconscious) Perception to Emotion: A Global-to-Specific Unfolding View of Emotional Responding"	2011	I. Nyklíček; A. Vingerhoets; M. Zeelenberg	Springer	Emotion Regulation and Well-Being	(Co-authored). Included in Retraction Watch listing	ISBN 978-1-4419-6952-1

The Noort committee, examining publications stemming from Stapel's time at the University of Groningen, also considered a number of book chapters in edited works suspect. In the case of these works, having less surviving original data available to examine, the Noort committee concluded with less certainty only "evidence of fraud". In the Flawed Science report they note the following chapters, under the heading: "The following book chapters are (partly) based on findings of articles, in which the Committees have found evidence of fraud:"

- — (2001). "Let's not forget the past when we go to the future: On our knowledge of knowledge accessibility effects". In Moskowitz, G. B. (ed.). Cognitive social psychology: The Princeton symposium on the legacy and future of social cognition. Mahwah NJ, U.S: Lawrence Erlbaum. pp. 229–246. [Coauthored].
- — (2003). "Making sense of hot cognition: Why and when description influences our feelings and judgments". In J. P Forgas; K. D. Williams; W. von Hippel (eds.). Social judgments: Implicit and explicit processes. New York: Cambridge University Press. pp. 227–250. (Sydney Symposium of Social Psychology series).
- — (January 2001). "What's on our mind and how did it get there? The role of knowledge accessibility in social psychological phenomena". In Abraham Tesser; Norbert Schwarz (eds.). Blackwell Handbook of Social Psychology: Intraindividual Processes. Wiley. pp. 236–256. [Coauthored].

=== "Coping with chaos" ===
The first journal article retraction occurred a month after Tilburg University announced that it had found evidence of fraud in Stapel's work. In December 2011, the journal Science posted a retraction notice for Stapel's co-authored paper entitled "Coping with chaos: How disordered contexts promote stereotyping and discrimination". The journal expressed initial concern regarding the paper's validity on 1 November. The retraction statement in Science says:

Our report "Coping with chaos: How disordered contexts promote stereotyping and discrimination" reported the effects of the physical environment on human stereotyping and discriminatory behavior. On 31 October 2011, the University of Tilburg held a press conference to announce findings of their investigation into possible data fraud on the part of author Stapel. These findings of the university's interim report included fabrication of data in this Science paper. Therefore, we are retracting the paper, with apologies from author Stapel. Coauthor Lindenberg was in no way involved in the generation of the data, and agrees to the retraction of the paper.

Following the retraction, coauthor of the "Chaos" paper, Siegwart Lindenberg, told the journal in an email, "Stapel's doing had caught me as much by surprise as it did anybody else. I never had any suspicion. He was a very trusted man, dean of the faculty, brilliant, successful, no indications for me to be distrustful. In this, I was not the only one. I also had no trouble with the results of the experiments."

=== Selfishness in carnivores ===
The 2011 research result, obtained by Stapel and co-workers Roos Vonk and Marcel Zeelenberg, that carnivores are more selfish than vegetarians, which was widely publicized in Dutch media, was suspected and later turned out to be based on falsified data. The research result had not yet been published in a scientific journal; only a press bulletin was released.

== Other publications ==
- Stapel, Diederik (November 2012). Ontsporing ('Derailment'). Prometheus Books ISBN 90-446-2312-5
  - English translation as a free download in PDF format
- Dautzenberg, A. H. J.; Stapel, Diederik (September 2014). De fictiefabriek. Een bevrijdingsroman in brieven ['The Fiction Factory. A Liberating Epistolary Novel']. Atlas Contact. (in Dutch) ISBN 978-90-254-4269-9

== See also ==
- List of scientific misconduct incidents
- Schön scandal
- Jonathan Pruitt
