= Jonathan Pruitt =

American behavioral ecologist

- Born: Jonathan Neal Pruitt; Florida
- Education: University of Tennessee; University of South Florida
- Scientific career
- Fields: Behavioral ecology; Arachnology
- Workplaces: McMaster University; University of California, Santa Barbara; University of Pittsburgh; University of California, Davis
- Thesis: Sociality in the Spider Anelosimus studiosus: Behavioral Correlates and Adaptive Consequences (2010 (withdrawn))
- Doctoral advisor: Susan Riechert
- Other academic advisors: Andy Sih; Jay Stachowicz

Jonathan Neal Pruitt is a former academic researcher. He was an Associate Professor of behavioral ecology and Canada 150 Research Chair in Biological Dystopias at McMaster University. Pruitt's research focused primarily on animal personalities and the social behavior of spiders and other organisms.

In early 2020, some of Pruitt's research was identified as having data irregularities, and Pruitt was alleged to have manipulated data. An investigation by McMaster found that he had "engaged in fabrication and falsification.” In 2021 it was reported that Pruitt "had a dozen papers retracted following allegations of data fraud" and that his doctoral dissertation had also been withdrawn. He resigned from McMaster in 2022 after receiving confidential settlement terms.

== Early life ==
Pruitt was raised in Central Florida. He attended Polk Community College, now Polk State College, and subsequently continued his studies at the University of South Florida and University of Tennessee, Knoxville.

== Career ==
Pruitt received a doctorate at the University of Tennessee, Knoxville (since retracted) under his advisor Susan Riechert. Pruitt completed a postdoc at the UC Davis Center for Population Biology under the supervision of Andy Sih and Jay Stachowicz and was hired as an assistant professor in the Department of Biological Sciences at the University of Pittsburgh in 2011. He later moved to UC Santa Barbara and then, in 2018, to McMaster University. His research was funded by the National Science Foundation.

== Data irregularities ==
Concerns about the integrity of Pruitt's research first publicly emerged in January 2020. In February 2020, McMaster University announced that it was reviewing 17 of his publications, and 23 journals were reviewing publications by Pruitt. By February 7, seven papers authored by Pruitt had been retracted or were in the process of being retracted. Pruitt responded to the allegations by stating that the irregularities in his data were mistakes, and he obtained legal counsel who cautioned journals and coauthors not to retract papers until institutional investigations were complete.

In 2020, UT Knoxville "withdrew" Pruitt‘s dissertation. In November 2021, Pruitt was placed on a paid administrative leave by McMaster, and in July 2022 he resigned from his university position. As of 2022 Pruitt was a Florida high school science teacher.

Pruitt has been compared to Diederik Stapel and Jan Hendrik Schön, who were also considered rising stars in their fields before the discovery of their fraudulent publications.

As of 2026, Pruitt has had 19 of his research publications retracted, 13 other papers have received an expression of concern, and four other papers have been corrected.

== Recent career ==
In 2023, Pruitt self-published a dark fantasy novel, The Amber Menhir.

== See also ==
- List of scientific misconduct incidents
