= Hol Maren =

Dutch mansion

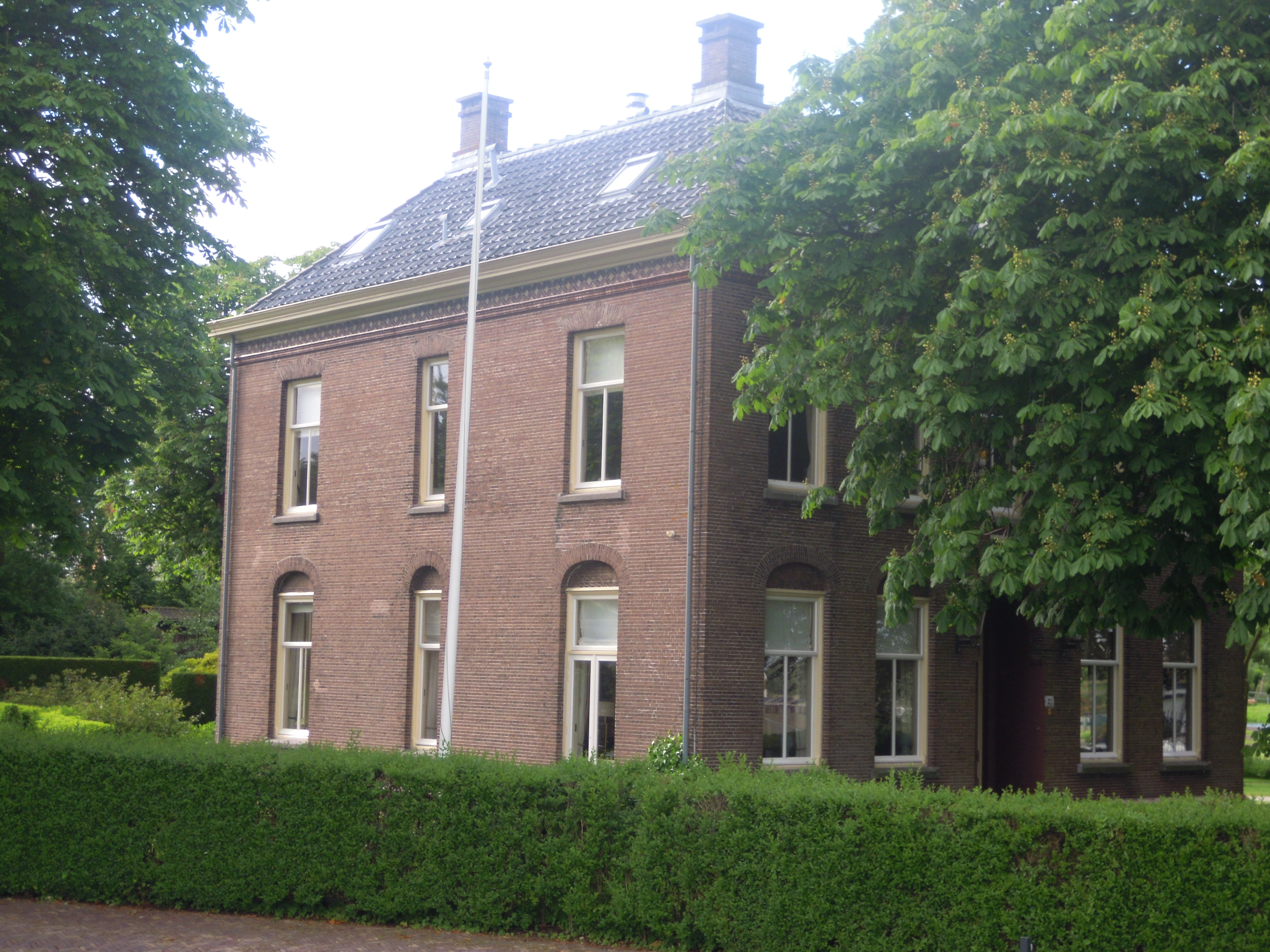
- Interactive map of the Hol Maren area

General information
- Location: Oegstgeest, Netherlands
- Coordinates: 52.182615°N 4.489491°E
- Completed: 1892
- Client: Johannes Spaargaren

Design and construction
- Architect: Hendrik Jesse

Hol Maren is a mansion in Oegstgeest, Netherlands on the Haarlemmertrekvaart, 21. The mansion was built in 1892 and was designed by the architect Hendrik Jesse (1860-1943) for the landowner and river fish trader Johannes Spaargaren.

The mansion is shaped as a block in old Dutch style with elements from the Dutch Neo-Renaissance, such as decorative arcs above the windows on the ground floor. The garden has the characteristics of a park.

Hol Maren is a municipal monument since 1991.
