= Roos Vonk =

- Born: 4 November 1960 (age 65); Leiden
- Scientific career
- Fields: Psychology
- Workplaces: Radboud Universiteit Nijmegen
- Website: http://www.roosvonk.nl

Roosje (Roos) Vonk (Leiden, 4 November 1960) is a Dutch professor (Dutch title: "hoogleraar") of social psychology at the Radboud University in Nijmegen author, and motivational speaker.

== Life and work ==
Vonk studied psychology at Leiden University. She received her PhD in 1990 for her dissertation The cognitive representation of persons: A multidimensional study of Implicit Personality Theory, impression formation, and person judgments. In 1999 she became professor at the Radboud University Nijmegen. In addition to her work at the university, she popularized psychology by means of books, articles, and lectures for the general public.

Vonk published on ingratiation, vulnerable egos, impression formation, intimate relationships, power and leadership, self-esteem and self-knowledge. In her research on ingratiation, she showed that we are all very sensitive to this and often do not notice when we are being flattered, even when there is a lot at stake. Because people typically ingratiate those with higher status and can be less friendly towards subordinates (the kiss-up and kick-down pattern), the behavior of people towards those with lower status is seen as more informative about how someone really is - a finding that is applied in recruitment and selection of personnel by Laszlo Bock, head of HR at Google. Vonk also wrote about human weaknesses, such as overconfidence and "emotional incontinence", and ways to facilitate self-improvement. She worked with Kristin Neff, a pioneer in the field of empirical research on self-compassion, and she translated Neff's test for self-compassion to Dutch.

From 2005 till 2008 Vonk was chairperson of animal welfare organisation Wakker Dier. Vonk also regularly writes opinion pieces with criticism on intensive livestock farming in Dutch newspapers. In 2010, she was the initiator and coordinator of a plea for more sustainable livestock farming by more than hundred Dutch professors from all disciplines. The plea described in detail the problems of greenhouse gas emissions, nitrogen, animal diseases, and animal welfare.

In August 2011, a press release was issued by Vonk, Marcel Zeelenberg and Diederik Stapel of Tilburg University about an investigation into the psychological meaning of meat. In this they concluded that meat eaters are less social and more selfish than non-meat eaters. A few weeks later, Vonk offered her apologies about the press release, because professor Stapel had used falsified data. Professor Stapel was put on administrative leave on 7 September After an internal investigation, the Radboud University concluded that Vonk was not guilty of fraudulent behavior. However, she was reprimanded for publishing premature conclusions related to data she had not verified.

== Selected scientific publications ==
- The cognitive representation of persons. A multivariate study of implicit personality theory, impression formation, and person judgments (dissertation University of Leiden), 1990
- Neff, K. D., & Vonk, R. (2009). Self‐compassion versus global self‐esteem: Two different ways of relating to oneself. Journal of personality, 77(1), 23-50.
- Vonk, R., Radstaak, M., De Heus, P., & Jolij, J. (2019). Ironic effects of feedback on contingency of self-worth: Why self-reports of contingency are biased. Self and Identity, 18(2), 183-200.
- Stel, M., Van Baaren, R. B., & Vonk, R. (2008). Effects of mimicking: Acting prosocially by being emotionally moved. European journal of social psychology, 38(6), 965-976.
- Vonk, R. (1996). Negativity and potency effects in impression formation. European Journal of Social Psychology, 26(6), 851-865.
- Vonk, R. (1999). Impression formation and impression management: Motives, traits, and likeability inferred from self-promoting and self-deprecating behavior. Social Cognition, 17(4), 390-412.
- Vonk, R. (2001). Aversive self-presentations. In R.M. Kowalski (Ed.), Behaving badly: Aversive interpersonal behaviors, pp. 79–155. Washington, DC: APA.
- Vonk, R. (2002). Self-serving interpretations of flattery: Why ingratiation works. Journal of Personality and Social Psychology, 82, 515-525.
- Vonk, R. (2002). Effects of stereotypes on attitude inference: Outgroups are black and white, ingroups are shaded. British Journal of Social Psychology, 41, 157-167.
- Vonk, R. & Ashmore, R.D. (2003). Thinking About Gender Types: Cognitive Organization of Female and Male Types. British Journal of Social Psychology, 41, 157-167.
- Vonk, R. & Smit, H. (2012). Optimal self-esteem is contingent: Intrinsic versus extrinsic, and upward versus downward contingencies. European Journal of Personality Psychology, 26, 182-193.

== Selected popular scientific books ==
- De eerste indruk (1998; revised seventh edition 2015). Amsterdam: Maven Publishing.
- Je bent wat je doet. (2014; revised edition 2019). Amsterdam: Maven Publishing.

== Study books ==
- Sociale psychologie (2005; third revised edition 2018). (Red.) Amsterdam: Boom.

== Other publications ==
- Vonk, R. (2008). Wijsheid van het hart. Psychologie Magazine, maart 2008
