= Oud Poelgeest =

Castle in Oegstgeest

Oud Poelgeest Castle
- Oegstgeest, the Netherlands
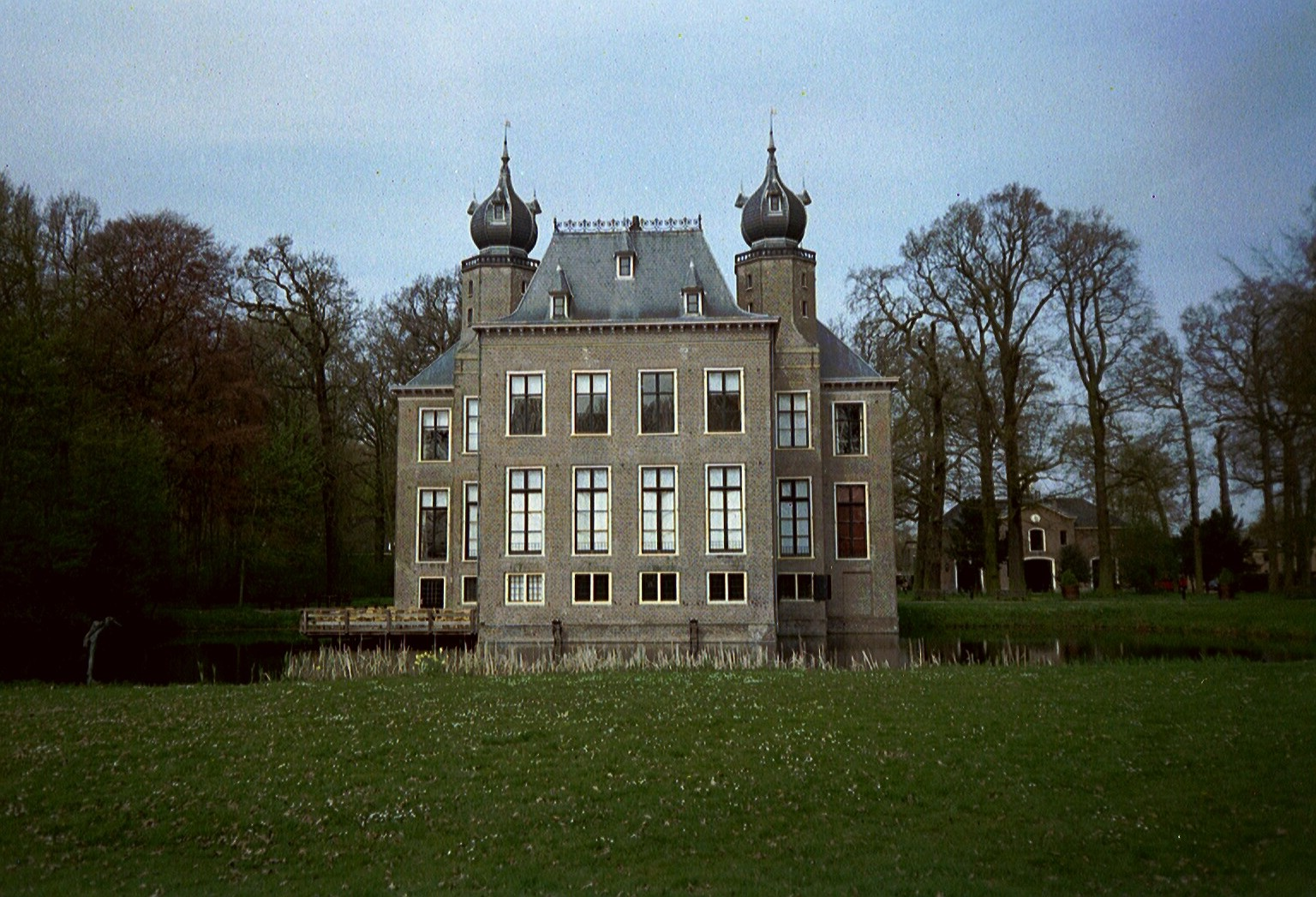
- Castle Oud Poelgeest

Site information
- Type: Castle
- Open to the public: Yes as Hotel

Location
- The Netherlands
- Coordinates: 52°10′47″N 4°29′06″E

Site history
- Built: 1668
- Built by: Erasmus den Otter
- Materials: Brick

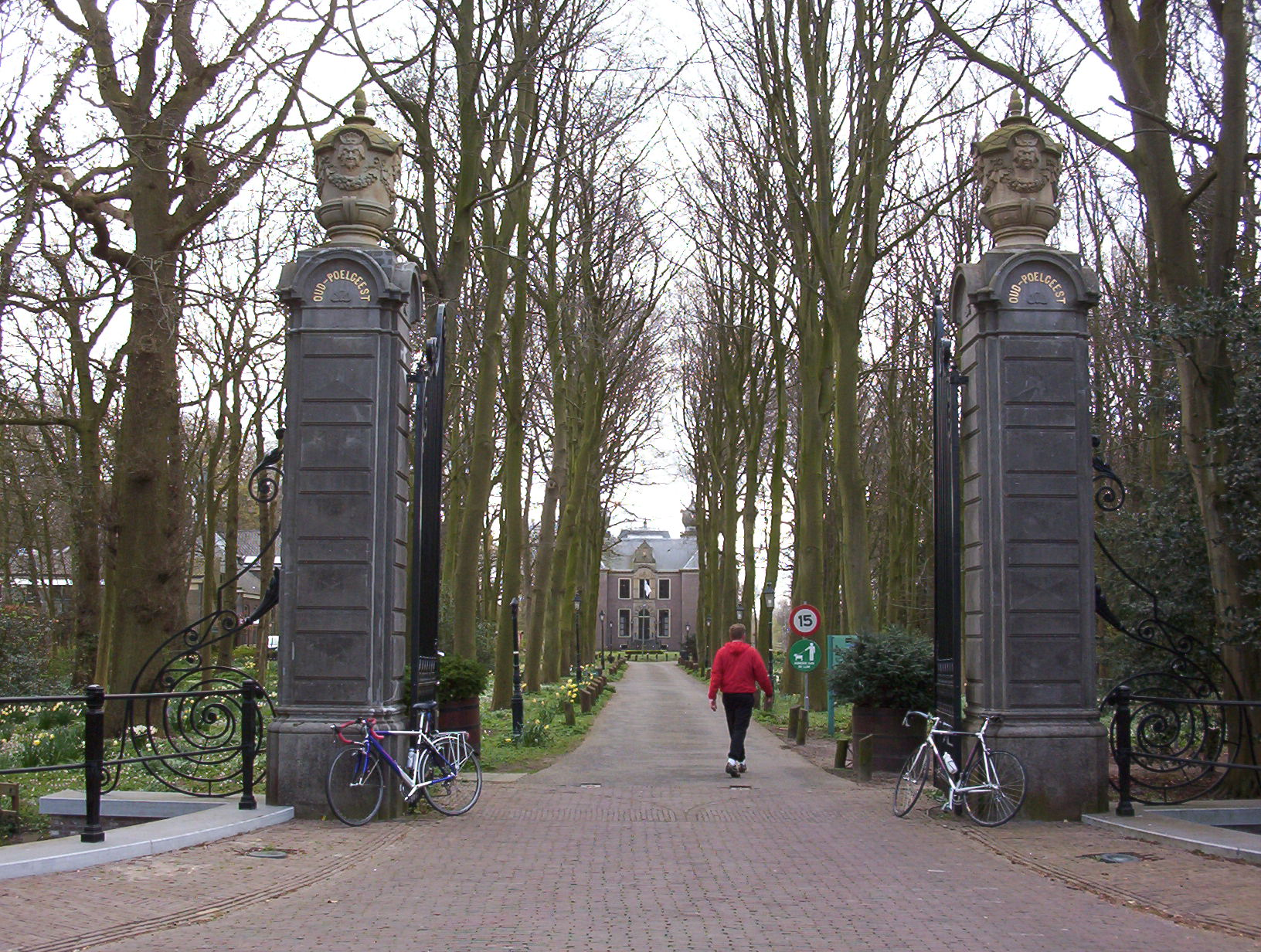
Oud Poelgeest gate, Herman Boerhaave's home in Leiden, seen from the entrance on the back side.

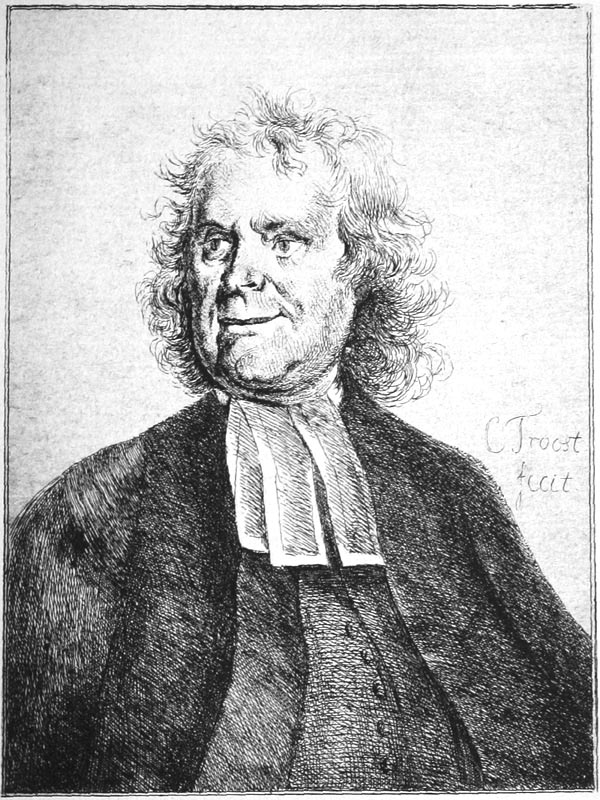
Herman Boerhaave

Oud Poelgeest is a castle in Oegstgeest, north of Leiden, that was the former home of the Dutch scientist Herman Boerhaave (1668–1738). He was a Dutch humanist and physician of European fame.

== History ==
The castle was built in 1668 on the foundations of an earlier construction, in the then popular Dutch Neoclassical style. It was probably built by the Haarlem architect Erasmus den Otter. The former castle, whose stone well from 1550 still exists in the woods, had been destroyed by the Spanish in 1574.

Boerhaave bought the castle in 1724 and designed the garden for his large botanical collection that no longer fit in the Hortus Botanicus Leiden. This site was renowned during his lifetime and rivaled Hortus Cliffortianus, the garden of his friend and sponsor to Linnaeus. He traveled back and forth to his friend's garden and to the Leiden University by trekschuit. All who traveled back and forth between Rotterdam and Amsterdam would pass this castle and wonder at the many foreign plants and trees. A tulip tree in the park that was planted by Boerhaave himself lived until the 1990s.

== Later changes ==
The onion domes were added after Herman Boerhaave's death by a later owner in 1866, along with the coach house (also a monument) in 1867.

Today, Oud Poelgeest is used as a hotel, with the old castle hosting conferences. The surrounding park is protected as a rijksmonument, as well as all of the older buildings around it.

== See also ==
- Museum Boerhaave
