= Oegstgeest =

- Town / Municipality
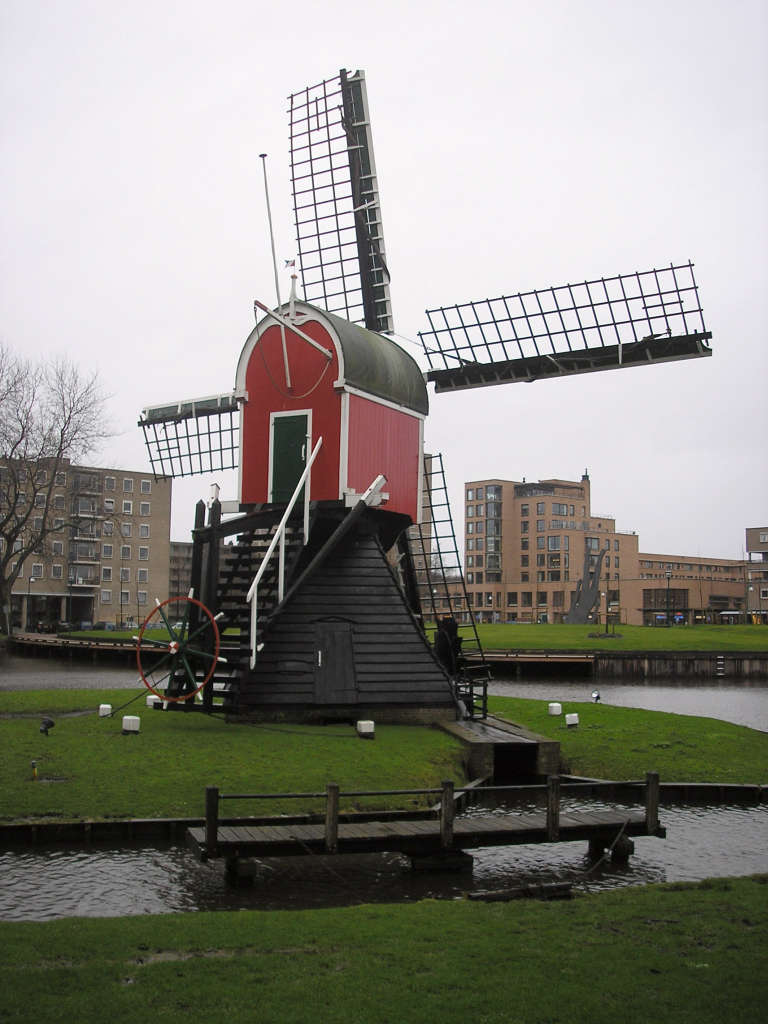
- Wind mill Oudenhofmolen in Oegstgeest

- Flag Coat of arms

- Location in South Holland
- Coordinates: 52°11′N 4°28′E
- Country: Netherlands
- Province: South Holland

Government
  - Body: Municipal council
  - Mayor: Emile Jaensch (VVD)

Area
  - Total: 7.97 km^{2} (3.08 sq mi)
  - Land: 7.31 km^{2} (2.82 sq mi)
  - Water: 0.66 km^{2} (0.25 sq mi)
- Elevation: 0 m (0 ft)

Population (January 2021)
  - Total: 25,064
  - Density: 3,429/km^{2} (8,880/sq mi)
- Demonym: Oegstgeestenaar
- Time zone: UTC+1 (CET)
  - Summer (DST): UTC+2 (CEST)
- Postcode: 2340–2343
- Area code: 071
- Website: www.oegstgeest.nl

Oegstgeest (Dutch pronunciation: [ˌuxstˈxeːst]) is a town and municipality in the province of South Holland in the western Netherlands. Its population was 25,064 in 2021.

== Etymology ==
The portion geest in the name refers to the geest lands, which were excavated in the seventeenth century for the benefit of the urban expansion of Leiden.

There exists more uncertainty about the 'Oegst' part. There are various stories. The name was formerly often spelled Oestgeest or Oostgeest, which could indicate the geographical location of the village: east of the geest lands. However, the oldest spelling found in a copy of a list of goods of the St. Martin's Cathedral in Utrecht from the tenth century states Osgeresgeest. This could indicate an original resident and owner of the territory: Osger.

In the Middle Ages they also spoke of the Church of Kerckwerve if one referred to the Oegstgeester parish church (now the Green Church).

== History ==
Oegstgeest is one of the earliest inhabited places along the coast. Evidence of a Batavian settlement from the second century was found in 1946 in an extension of a coastal dune in the Elgeesterpolder, although it is not certain whether this location remained permanently inhabited in later centuries.

By the 9th century, there was already a little church in the same location as the current Little Green Church (Groen Kerkje) which, according to legend, was dedicated by Willibrord. The existence of this church is an indication that there may have been a community there.

From the 11th to the 14th century, Oegstgeest enjoyed a period of progress. This ended when Leiden was granted city rights. The carrying out of trades and construction were no longer permitted within a certain distance from the city. In 1399, the heerlijkheid of Oegstgeest and that of Poelgeest were merged because their declining populations could no longer afford to pay the required taxes to the Count of Holland.

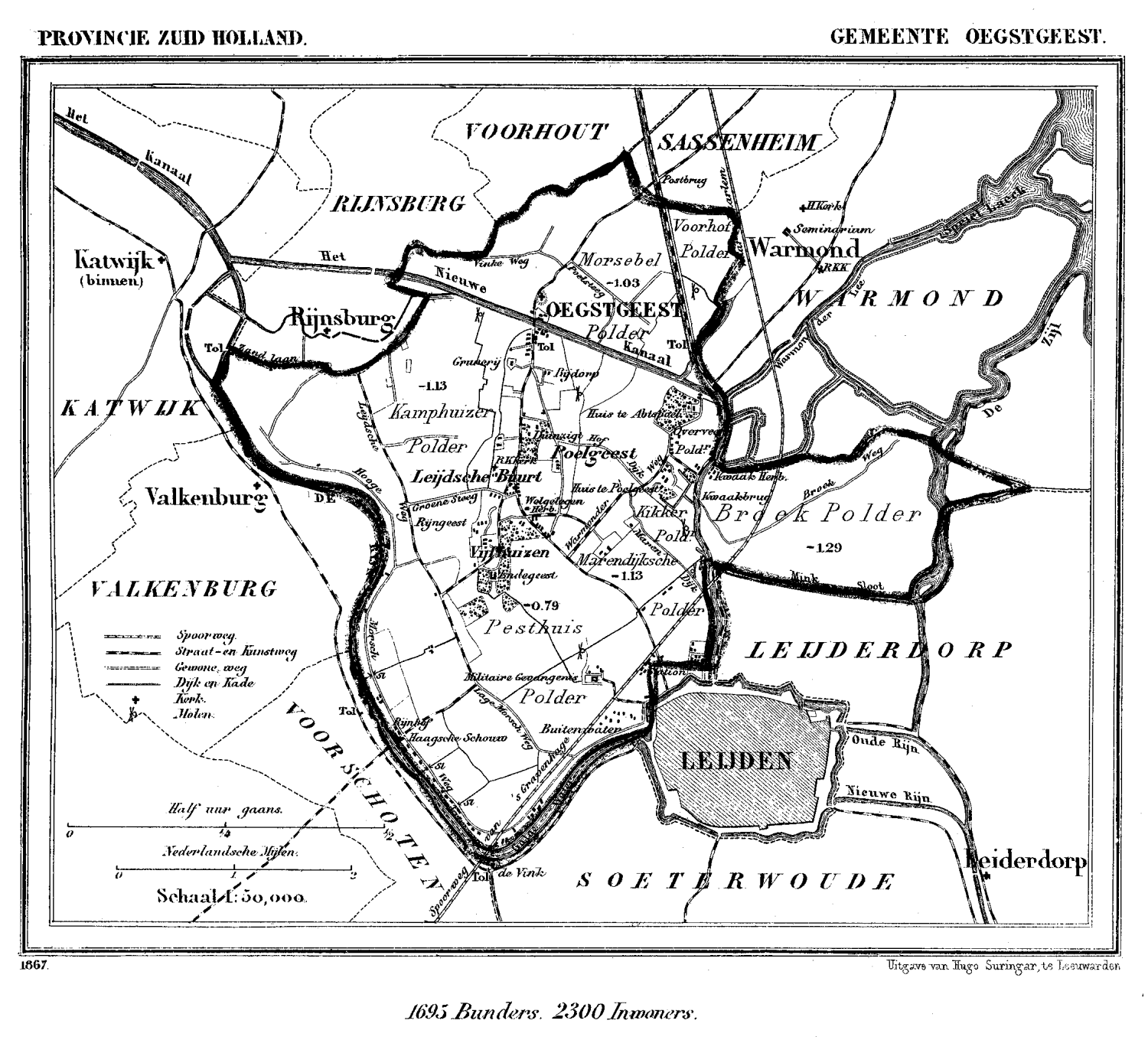
Oegstgeest in 1867

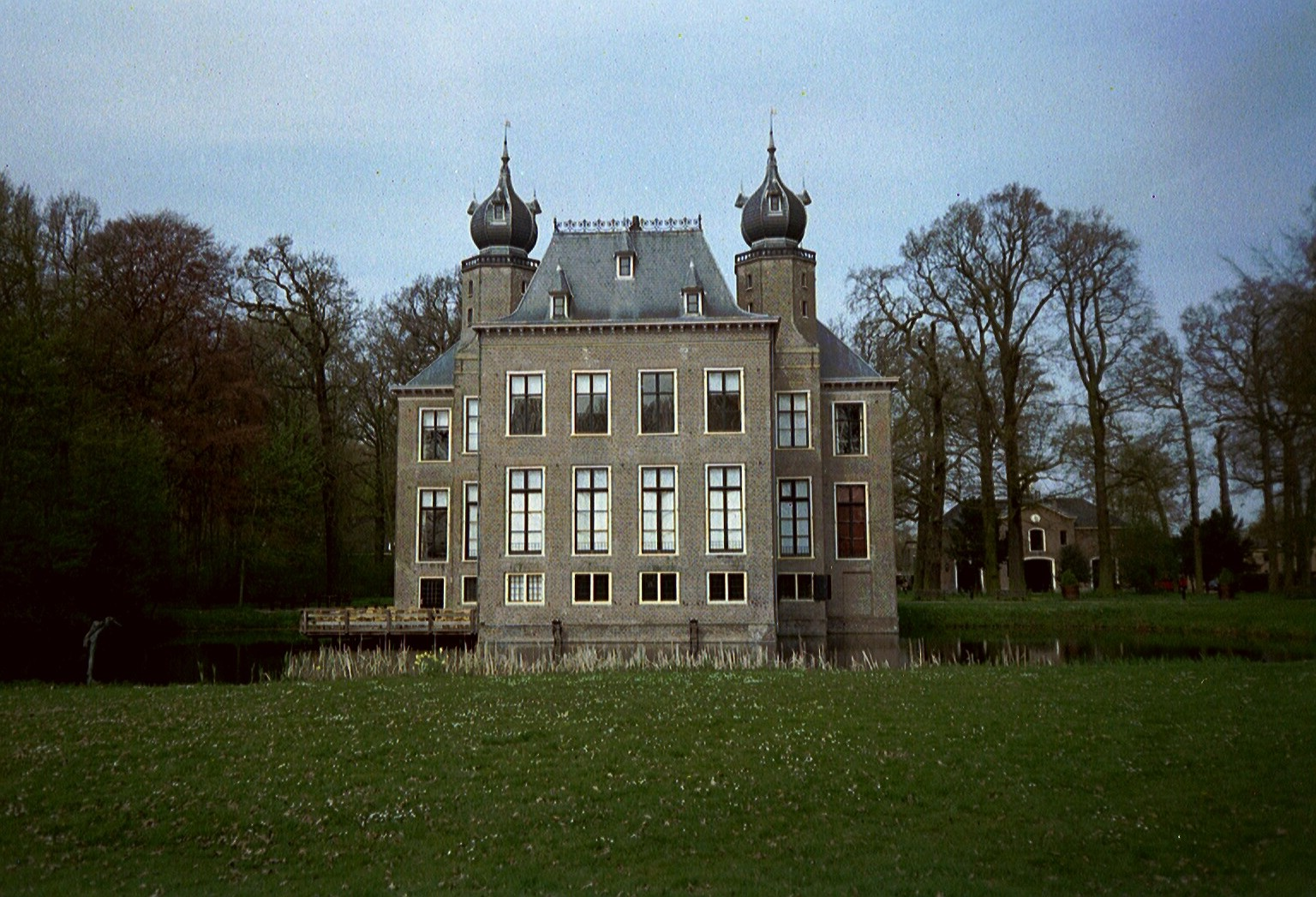
Oud Poelgeest

Until the 19th century the boundary of Oegstgeest extended right to the city walls and moats of Leiden. But in the 19th and 20th century, it conceded more and more of its territory to the rapidly expanding city of Leiden.

Before the early 20th century, Oegstgeest had a rural character and did not have a centre of population. It consisted of several unconnected smaller settlements. Only after 1900 were new neighbourhoods built between the settlements. First Wilhelminapark was built, followed by Prins Hendrikpark (circa 1915), Buitenlust or Indische Buurt (1925), Julianapark, Oranjepark, and Emmapark (1920–1950), and Grunerie and the area between Emmalaan and Lange Voort (1950s). In the 1980s and 1990s, the Haaswijk and Morsebel neighbourhoods were built, followed by Poelgeest in the 2000s. In 2006 construction started on a new neighbourhood, Nieuw Rhijngeest.

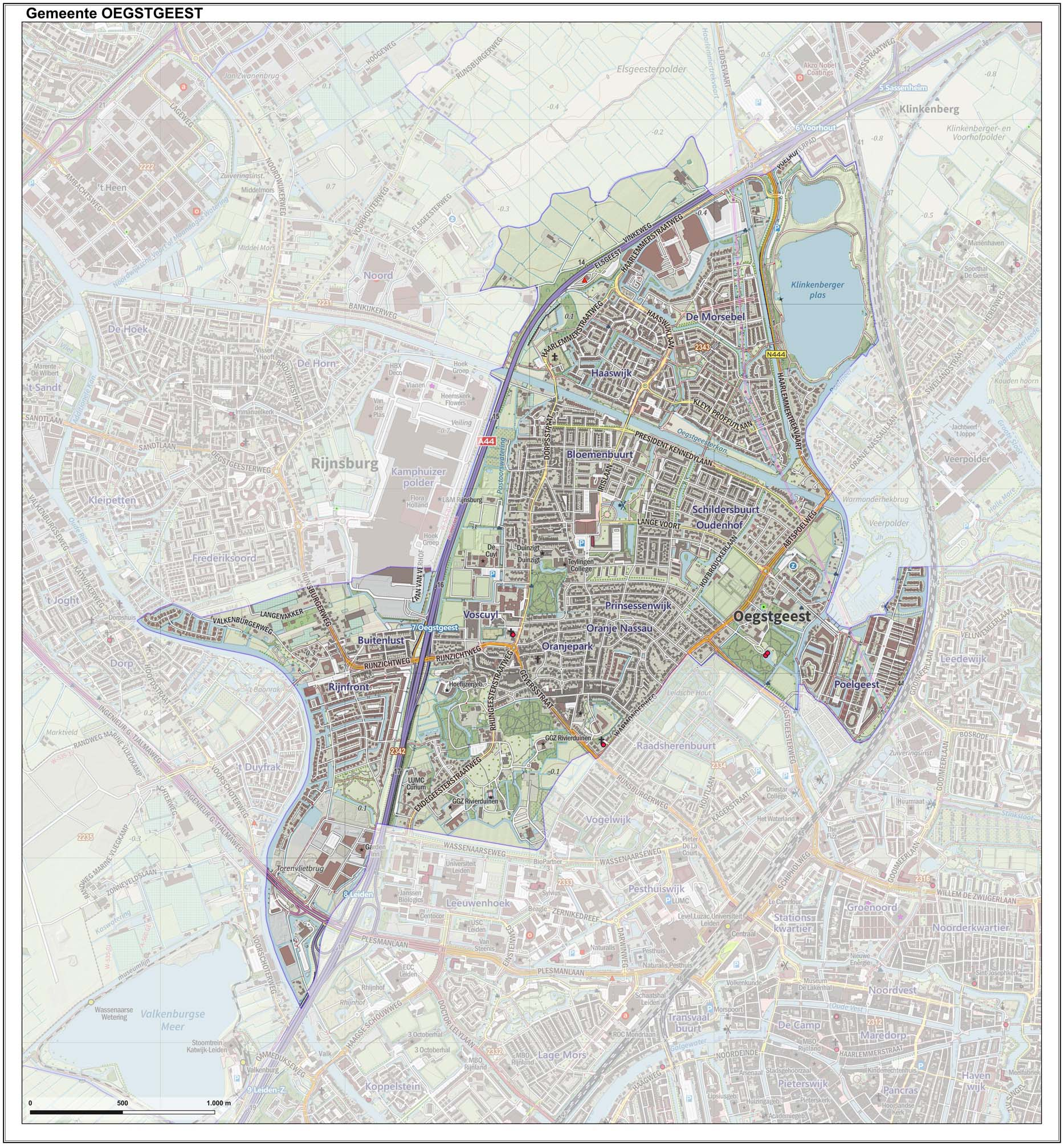
Map of the municipality of Oegstgeest, June 2015

== Geography ==
The municipality of Oegstgeest covers an area of 7.97 km^{2} (3.08 sq mi) of which 0.66 km^{2} (0.25 sq mi) is water. Oegstgeest lies just to the north of Leiden, with which it is conjoined in a conurbation and formed the Leiden region. Oegstgeest is a separate municipality, but it is effectively a suburb of Leiden. The municipality of Katwijk is to the west, the municipality of Teylingen to the north, the Kaag Lakes (Kagerplassen) to the northeast and Leiderdorp to the east.

== Sports ==
Oegstgeest has 2 football clubs: FC Oegstgeest and ASC. At the latter cricket is also played. FIKS is the local korfball team. At LOHC hockey is played and the neighbouring OLTC (founded 1886) is the tennis club of the municipality. Oegstgeest has one volleyball club called VCO.

== Notable people ==
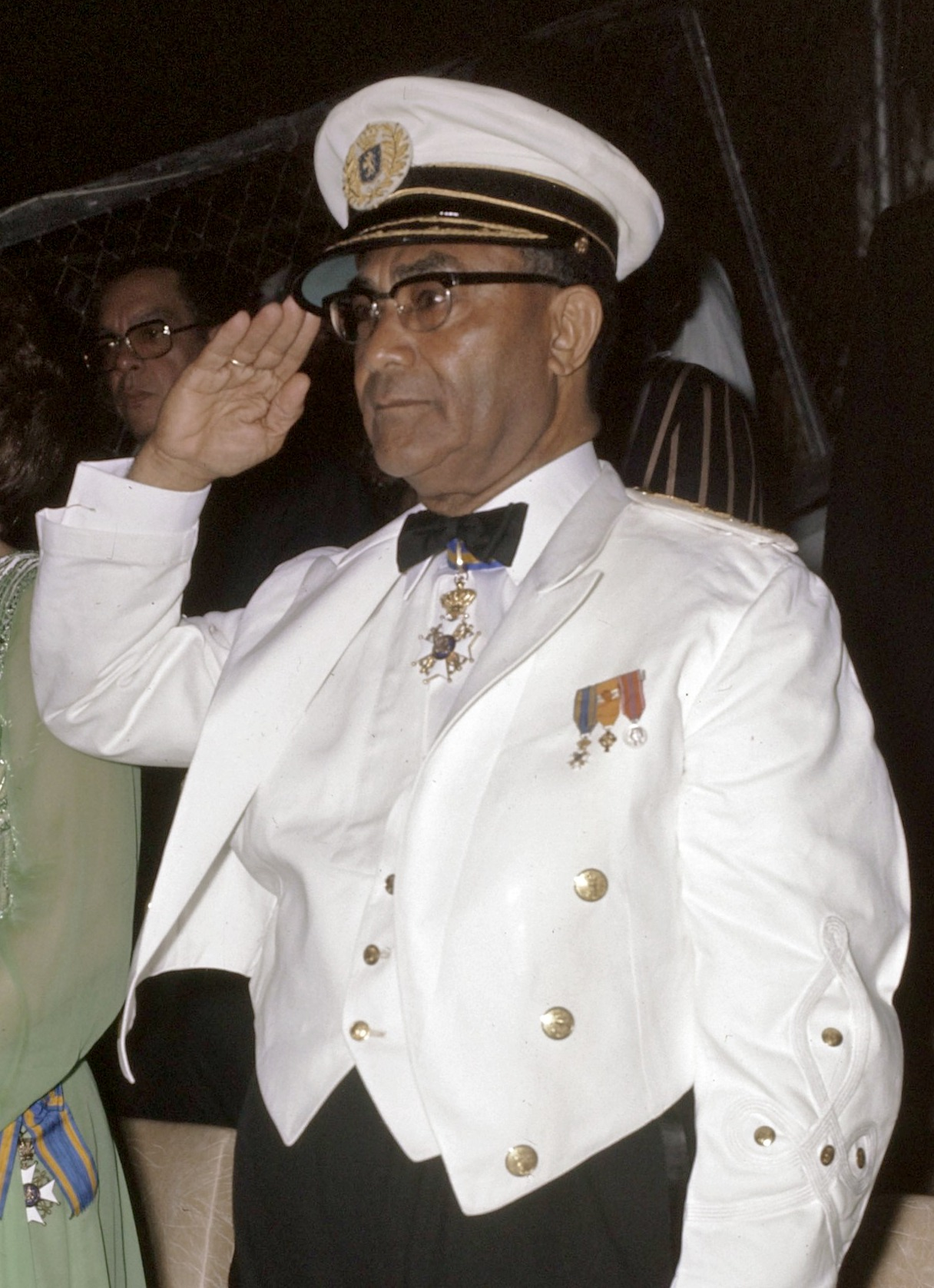
Johan Ferrier, 1975

- Gustaaf Schlegel (1840 in Oegstgeest – 1903) a sinologist and field naturalist
- Joannes Jacobus Smith (1867–1947), botanist, died in Oegstgeest
- Jan van Gilse (1881–1944 in Oegstgeest) a composer and conductor
- Carel Polak (1909–1981 in Oegstgeest) a politician and jurist
- Johan Ferrier (1910–2010 in Oegstgeest) a Surinamese politician, the first President of Suriname 1975 to 1980
- Kees Bol (1916 in Oegstgeest – 2009) a painter and art educator
- Edzo Toxopeus (1918 – 2009 in Oegstgeest) a politician, diplomat and jurist
- Dick Blok (1925 in Oegstgeest – 2019) a scholar of onomastics
- Jan Wolkers (1925 in Oegstgeest – 2007) an author, sculptor and painter
- Aad Kosto (born 1938 in Oegstgeest) a retired politician and jurist
- Ram Lakhina (born 1939) an Indian entrepreneur and community leader, lives in Oegstgeest
- Hans Blokland (born 1943 in Oegstgeest) a former politician and MEP
- Harold Goddijn (born 1960 in Oegstgeest) CEO of the Dutch electronics company TomTom
- Theo Maassen (born 1966 in Oegstgeest) a comedian and actor
- Diederik Stapel (born 1966), professor known for fabricating research data

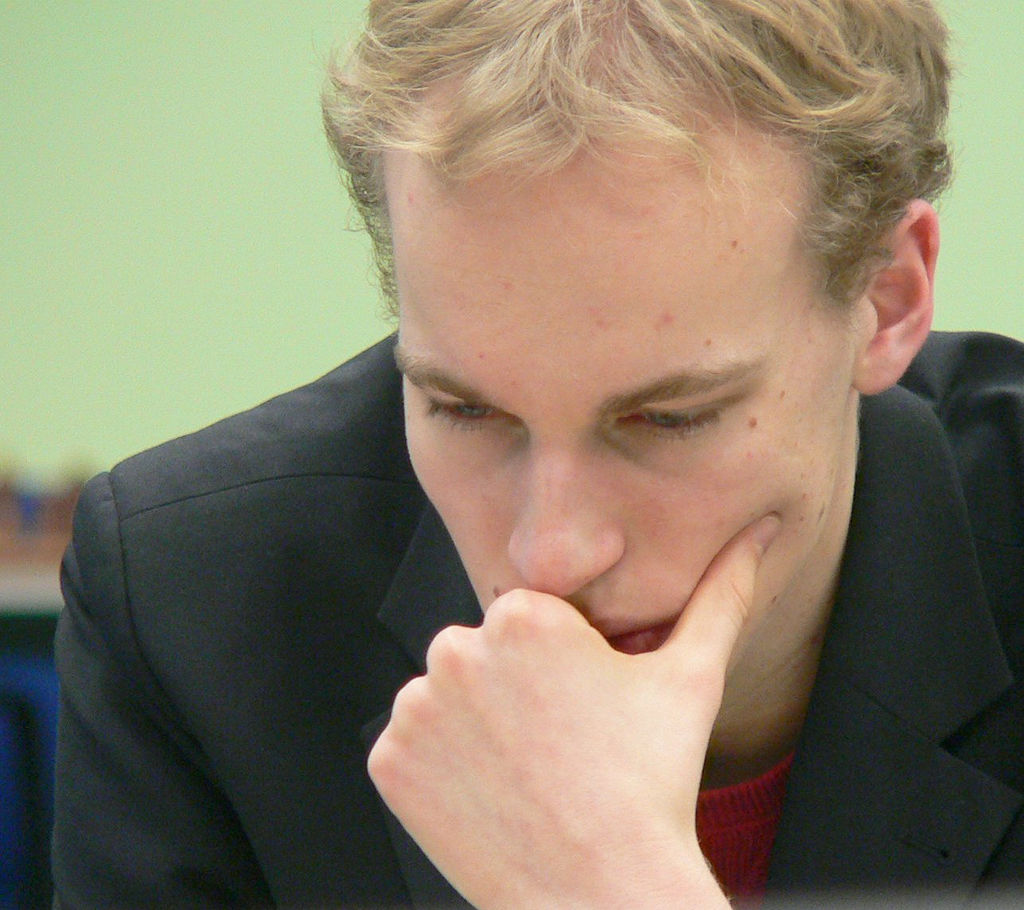
Jan Smeets, 2005

=== Sport ===
- Boudewijn Binkhorst (1942 in Oegstgeest – 2021) a sailor, competed at the 1968 Summer Olympics
- Freek van de Graaff (1944 in Oegstgeest – 2009) a Dutch rower, team bronze medallist at the 1964 Summer Olympics
- Jan Smeets (born 1985 in Oegstgeest) a chess grandmaster

== Gallery ==
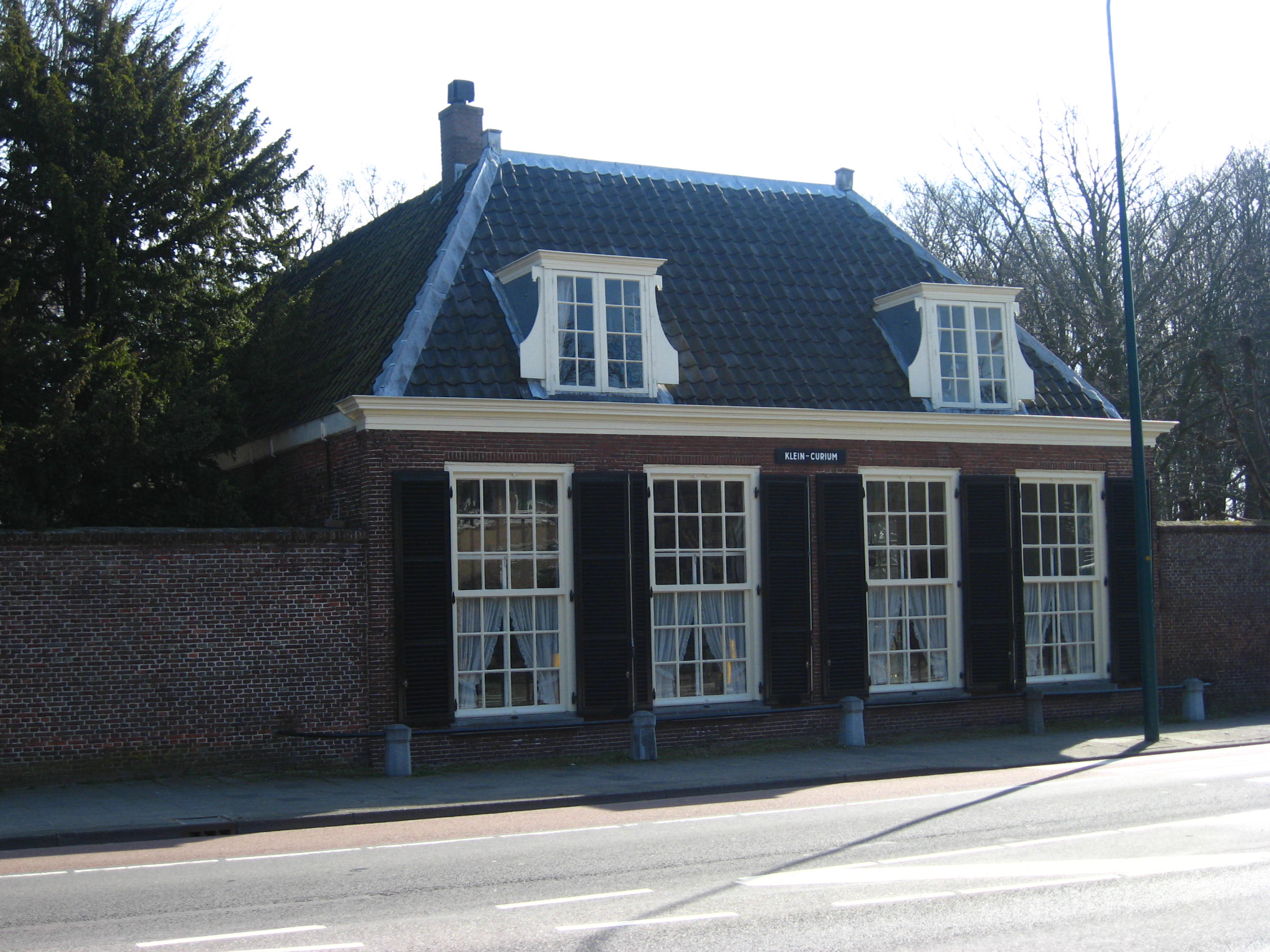
Klein Curium

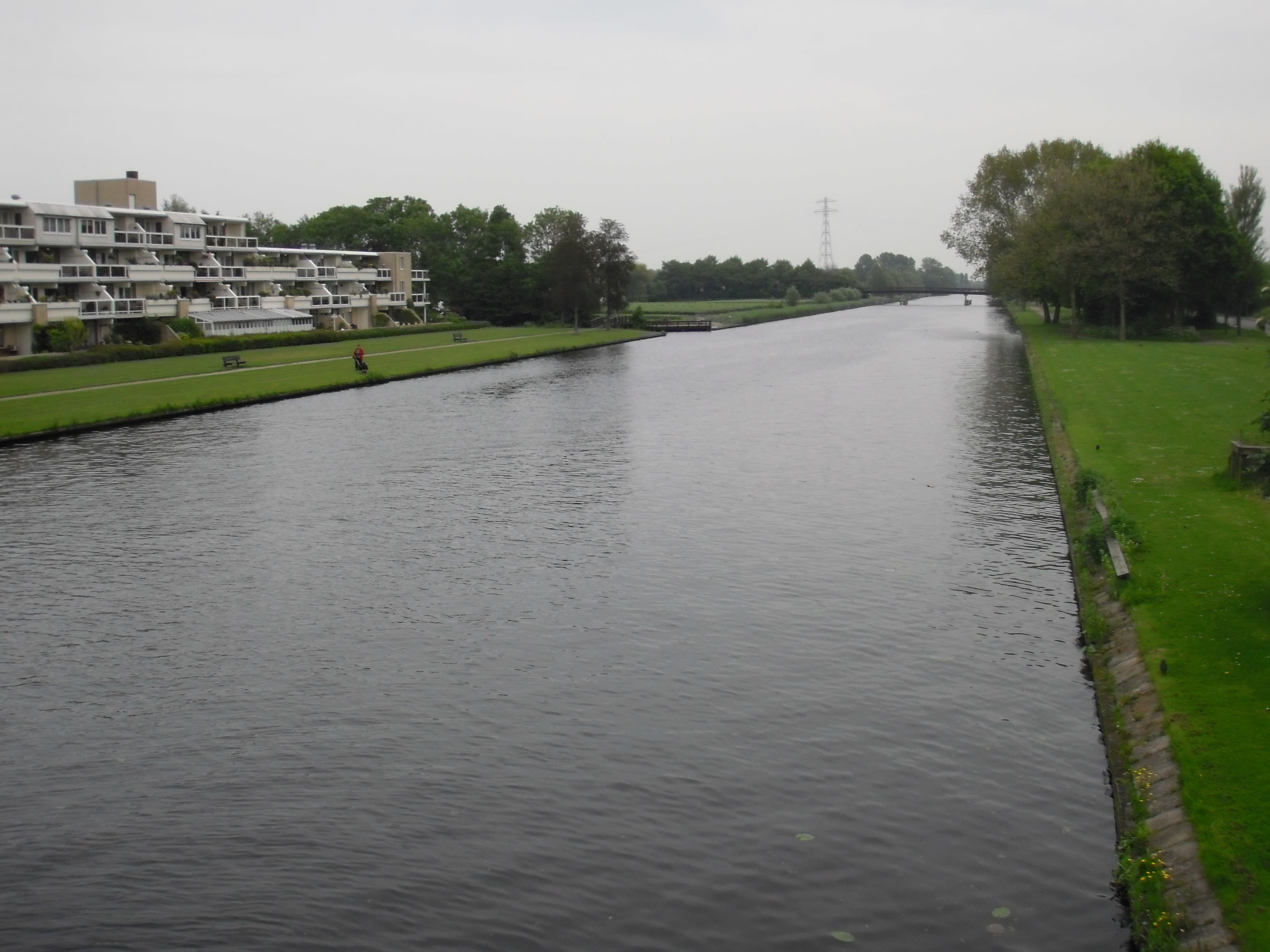
Oegstgeest

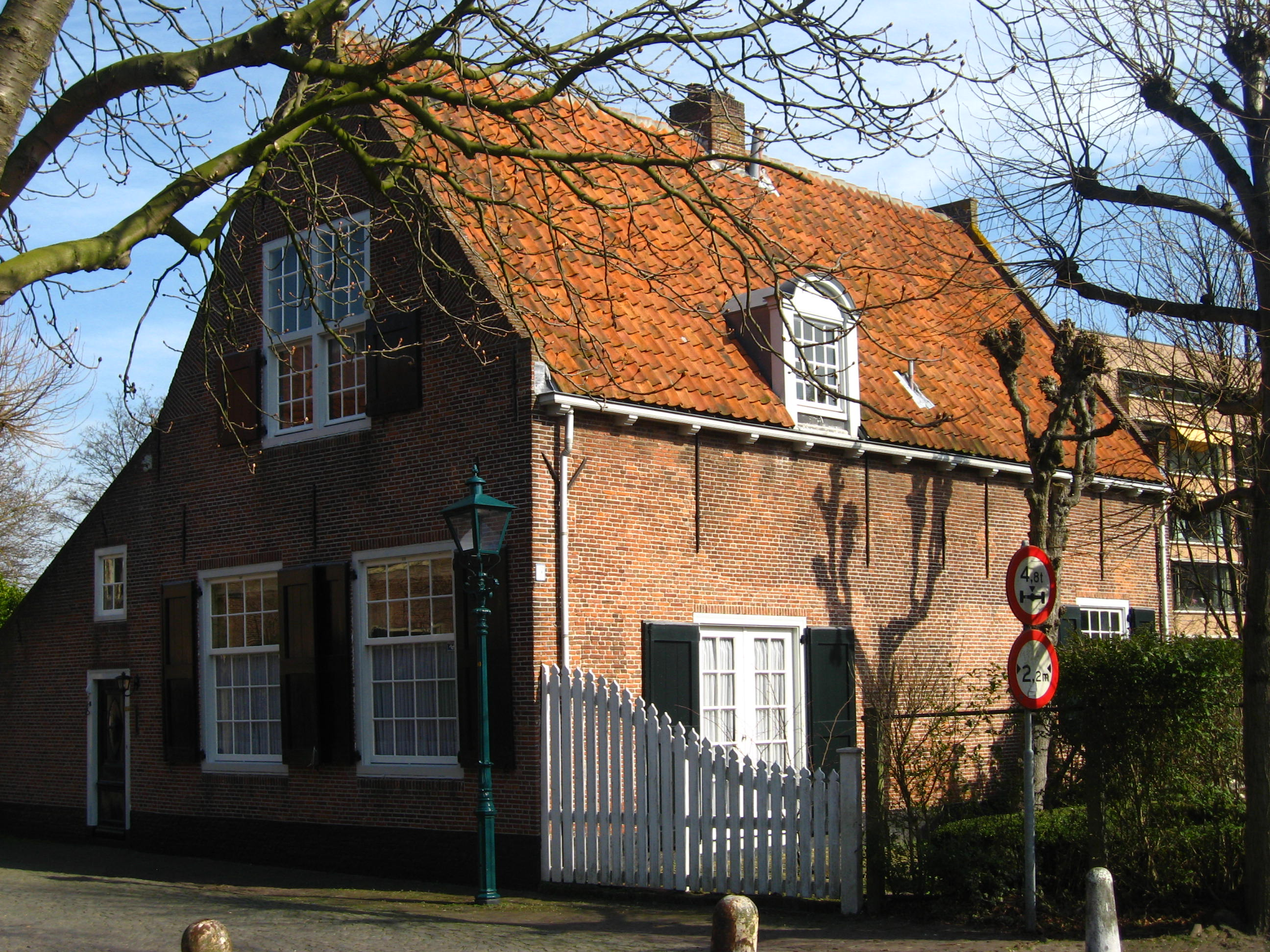
Torenvelt

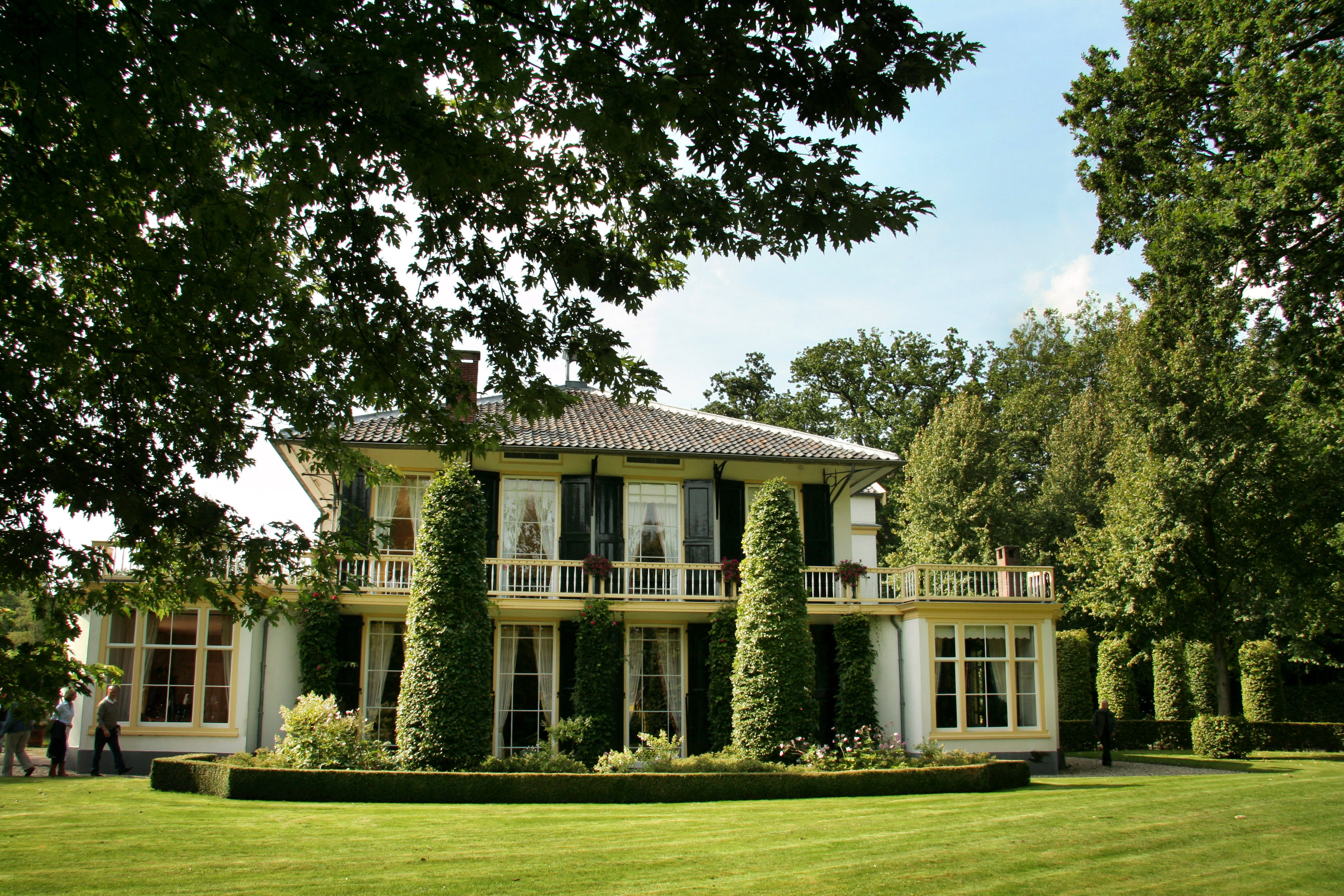
Hoofdgebouw Rhijngeest

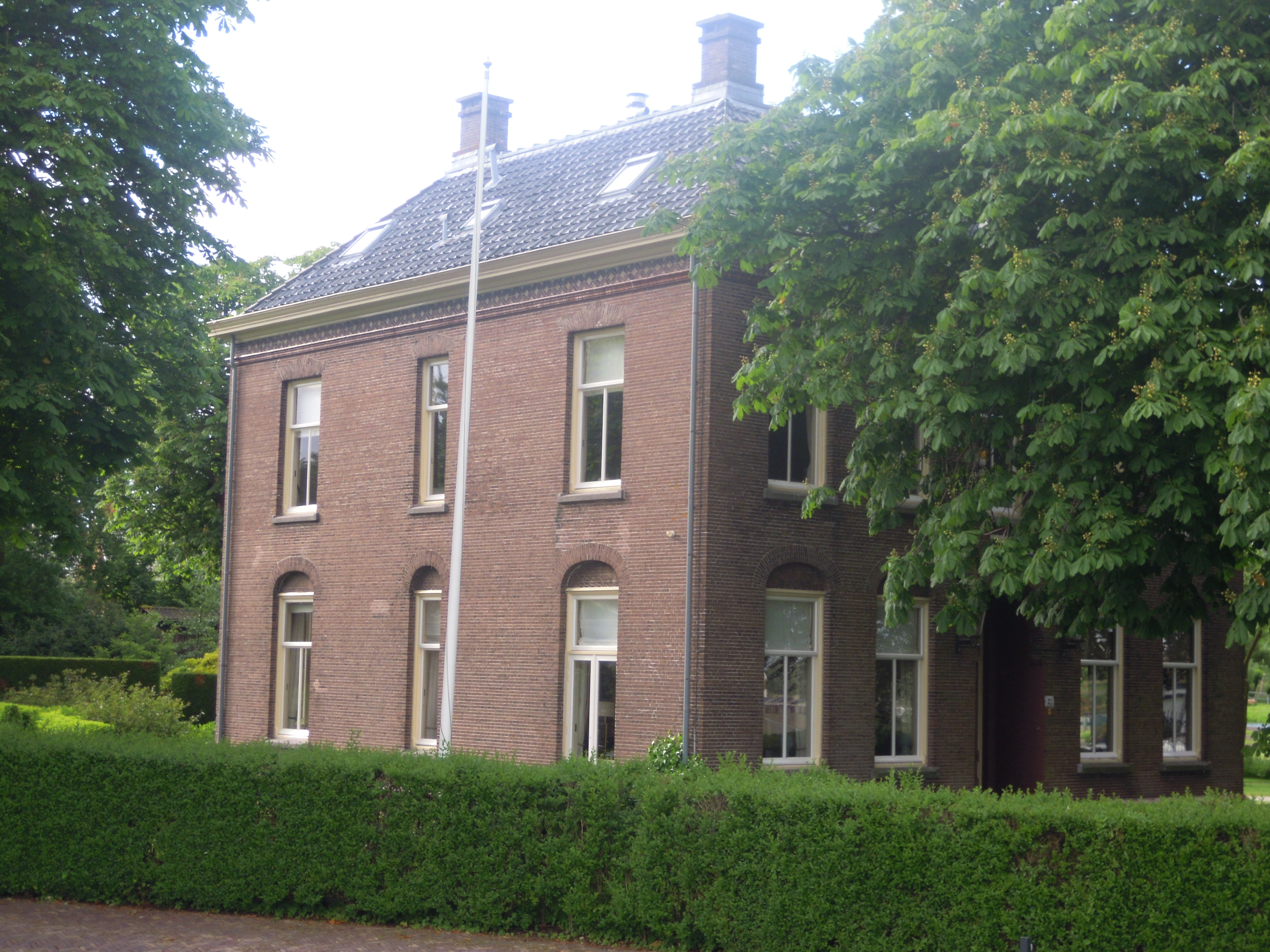
Hol Maren
