= Filana Therapeutics =

American pharmaceutical company

Filana Therapeutics, Inc.
- Formerly: Cassava Sciences, Inc, Pain Therapeutics, Inc.
- Type: Public
- Traded as: Nasdaq: FLNA
- Industry: Pharmaceuticals
- Founded: 1998; 28 years ago in South San Francisco, California, U.S.
- Founder: Remi Barbier
- Headquarters: Austin, Texas, U.S.
- Website: www.filanatx.com

Filana Therapeutics, Inc. (formerly Cassava Sciences, Inc., formerly Pain Therapeutics Inc.) is an American pharmaceutical company based in Austin, Texas. Currently led by President and CEO Richard Barry, Filana is working on developing simufilam to treat tuberous sclerosis complex–related epilepsy. The company previously was developing simufilam (formerly known as PTI-125 and sumifilam) as an oral-tablet drug candidate for the treatment of Alzheimer's disease. Development of simufilam was discontinued in November 2024 after it failed to show clinical benefit in phase III clinical trials.

In June 2024, the United States Department of Justice (DOJ) charged an advisor to Cassava Hoau-Yan Wang, with fraud over research results related to the experimental drug. Less than a month later, the president, chief executive officer and chairman of the board, Remi Barbier, resigned along with Lindsay Burns, his wife, who was the company's senior vice president and Wang's co-author. The U.S. Securities and Exchange Commission (SEC) filed fraud charges in September 2024 against Barbier, Burns and Wang. The parties did not admit wrongdoing, but agreed to pay fines of the company $40 million, Barbier $175,000, Burns $85,000, and Wang $50,000. The DOJ dropped the fraud charges against Wang shortly before trial was scheduled to begin in October 2025 without giving a reason.

Filana Therapeutics was founded in 1998 by Remi Barbier as Pain Therapeutics, Inc., changing its name in 2019 to Cassava Sciences. The company initially worked on three drugs: the pain drugs Oxytrex and Remoxy, and PTI-901, which aimed to treat irritable bowel syndrome. The company had no drug approved as of 2021, and no product revenues between 2013 and 2021; with 25 employees, the company's stock was the sixth-best performing in 2021 before falling after concerns over simufilam research. On March 10, 2026, a new name Filana Therapeutics was adopted.

== History ==
=== Founding ===
The company was founded by Remi Barbier in May 1998 as Pain Therapeutics, focusing on opioids and chronic pain. Barbier first heard of the research led by Stanley M. Crain at the Albert Einstein College of Medicine in New York City around 1993. Crain invited Barbier to his lab and explained the potential pharmaceutical and financial benefits. In 1998, Barbier started Pain Therapeutics, Inc. in South San Francisco, California, with an initial investment of $1 million.

=== Name change ===
Following the fourth Food and Drug Administration (FDA) rejection of one of its experimental pain drugs, Remoxy, Pain Therapeutics announced in August 2018 it would reorganize the company to focus on products for treating and diagnosing Alzheimer's. In 2019, the company changed its name to Cassava Sciences.

On March 10, 2026, Cassava changed its name a second time to Filana Therapeutics. The name reflects its new goal of developing filamin A (FLNA)-targeted drugs for the treatment of brain diseases.

== Corporate affairs ==
=== Leadership ===
Remi Barbier was the president, chief executive officer and chairman of the board until his abrupt July 2024 resignation, when Richard J. (Rick) Barry was named executive chairman of the board. A CEO search was initiated, with the outgoing CEO, Barbier, to remain employed by the company until September 13, 2024, in a non-executive capacity, without duties or responsibilities. On September 9, Barry was named CEO, and Claude Nicaise, who had served on the board since 2023, was appointed chairman of the board.

Lindsay Burns, the senior vice president for neuroscience and Barbier's wife, also resigned in 2024 following the indictment of her co-researcher Wang on charges of fraud. She was replaced in May 2025 by Angélique Bordey.

Hoau-Yan Wang, a professor at City University of New York (CUNY) is a consultant who was on Cassava's advisory board. He is a co-author, with Burns, of many journal papers. The Wall Street Journal (WSJ) stated in 2021 that, along with the company's officers, he could receive bonuses based on market performance; he was indicted in June 2024 for falsifying data related to Cassava's Alzheimer's drug in development, simufilam.

Other officers, as of July 2024, were James W. Kupiec, chief medical officer, and Eric Schoen, chief financial officer. In April 2025, the company announced that Kupiec would resign in May, and that Jack Moore would become senior vice president of clinical development, responsible for developing simufilam for tuberous sclerosis-related epilepsy. Also at that time, former Senior Counsel R. Christopher Cook was named chief operating and legal officer. Per the Filana website in August 2026, Joseph Hulihan is chief medical officer; other senior vice presidents are Michael Zamloot (tech operations) and George Thornton (technology), with Nancy Teasdale as head of regulatory affairs.

According to Charles Piller, writing in Science, Barbier would not specify in 2022 who were the company's 2022 scientific advisers. (Note: The company's SEC Form 10-K filings from 2021 state that Scientific Advisory Board members included Jeffrey Cummings, Steven Arnold, Barbara Sahakian, Trevor Robbins, and Hoau-Yan Wang.) Patrick Keefe wrote in The New Yorker in January 2022 that Cassava's bonus plan provides for potential cash bonuses tied to "specific valuations [of the company's stock] for twenty consecutive days". He added that the "full incentive scheme could exceed two hundred million dollars, and it was not pegged to F.D.A. approval or to the success of the drug—just to the share price. This appeared to create an incentive for the company to pump its own stock." The WSJ stated that, under this plan, Barbier's bonus could reach $108 million.

=== Financial ===
The company had no product revenues between 2013 and 2021. The company and its collaborators were awarded National Institutes of Health (NIH) grants totalling $20 million between 2015 and 2021. (Note: See Reporter.nih.gov Advanced search for NIH grants totaling over $20 million for Cassava Sciences.)

The WSJ wrote that, due to the promise of Simufilam, the company stock became the sixth-best in 2021, driving the company's value to over $US5 billion, with the stock price reaching $125 per share. Keefe noted that part of the increase in share price was driven by discussion and hype in online forums, making it a so-called meme stock. The share price fell to $42 after a petition was filed with the FDA in August 2021, questioning the company's research. After Wang's June 2024 indictment, the stock fell by 46% to a new low of about $10 per share.

Following the November 2024 announcement that simufilam had failed Phase III trials, Cassava stock fell to $4.29 per share, losing 84% of its value in one day.

=== Staffing ===
As of November 2021, the company had 25 employees.

== Research candidates ==
The company had no drug approved as of 2021.

=== FLNA hypothesis ===
Filamin-A (FLNA) is a protein that the company says becomes misshaped in people with Alzheimer's, leading to amyloid buildup in the brain contributing to the disease; Cassava journal papers, co-authored by Wang and Burns, suggest that the shape of FLNA in the brain can be restored. A 2022 article in The New York Times stated that none of the Alzheimer's experts they spoke with knew of any support for the FLNA hypothesis; Lawrence Sterling Honig, professor of neurology at Columbia University Irving Medical Center, said: "But in fact, all the evidence seems to be from this [Wang's] lab." (Wang and Burns had earlier published together on FLNA's supposed role in opioid receptor signaling.)

=== Oxytrex, Remoxy and PTI-901 ===
The company started with three drug candidates based on opioids: Oxytrex (oxycodone and naltrexone), Remoxy (oxycodone) and PTI-901 (low-dose naltrexone for irritable bowel syndrome).

Oxytrex was a mixture of two generic drugs, oxycodone and naltrexone that aimed to enhance analgesia while reducing opioid tolerance and withdrawal symptoms. The drug combination failed phase III clinical trials.

Remoxy was a twice-daily gel form of oxycodone intended to be abuse-deterrent. It was repeatedly rejected by the FDA, culminating in the final rejection in 2018 after an FDA advisory meeting raised concerns about a potential risk of abuse. According to The New York Times, the FDA reprimanded the company for appearing to promote the unapproved drug. Barbier accused the FDA of "math errors, material mistakes and misrepresentations", which the agency denied.

=== Alzheimer's disease ===
In August 2020, the chemical name simufilam was assigned to the company's experimental drug, previously called PTI-125, which was claimed to restore misshaped FLNA in the brain. Open-label studies had started in March 2020, and the company reported in May 2020 that initial biomarker analysis of cerebrospinal fluid (CSF) samples from its phase IIb clinical trials of PTI-125 had failed, but reported in September 2020 that a new analysis by an "outside lab" showed improvements in biomarkers, adding that individuals with Alzheimer's also showed improvements in cognition with simufilam. It was later revealed that the outside lab was Wang's CUNY lab. In October 2021, larger trials were initiated; It was announced in December 2021 that the first phase III trial of simufilam would enroll about 750 participants, and the second 1,000. In the first quarter of 2022, 60 participants were enrolled; Stat stated that enrollment had slowed as of April 2022, as people were deterred from enlisting due to the prevailing controversies.

Development of simufilam was discontinued in November 2024 after it failed to show clinical benefit in phase 3 clinical trials; it was the company's only drug undergoing clinical trials.

== Allegations of research fraud ==
In June 2024, Wang was indicted by the United States Department of Justice for fraud and charged with falsifying data on $16 million in grant applications to the NIH related to simufilam.

Reuters reported in July 2024 that the DOJ and the U.S. Securities and Exchange Commission (SEC) were also investigating two senior employees. Barbier and Burns abruptly resigned in July 2024.

In September, the SEC charged the company, Barbier and Burns for "misleading statements ... made in September 2020 about the results of a phase two clinical trial for Cassava's purported drug treatment for Alzheimer's", and charged Wang for "manipulating the trial results". According to Reuters, the company "failed to disclose that a full set of patient data actually showed 'no measurable cognitive improvement in the patients' episodic memory,' [and] also failed to disclose Wang's role in the clinical trial and his personal, financial, and professional interests in the drug's success". The charges filed in the United States District Court for the Western District of Texas alleged that the company violated "antifraud provisions of the federal securities laws" and "reporting provisions of the federal securities laws" and the SEC stated in a press release that "without admitting or denying the allegations, Cassava, Barbier, and Burns ... agreed to pay civil penalties of $40 million, $175,000, and $85,000, respectively. Barbier and Burns agreed to be subject to officer-and-director bars of three and five years, respectively." The settlement must be approved by the U.S. District Court.

According to Science journal's Piller, "CUNY itself found Wang had committed 'egregious' scientific misconduct" and the SEC "charged that Wang had been 'unblinded' for patient fluid samples [while Burns] 'negligently failed to fully disclose' that she had removed data from 40% of the volunteers in a phase 2 simufilam clinical trial after learning which ones received simufilam or the placebo." Piller wrote that the SEC complaint stated that Cassava had "raised more than $260 million from investors after that [phase 2] announcement", when in fact, "the complete data showed the drug failed to improve 'episodic' memory in Alzheimer's patients".

For a trial slated to begin in October 2025, CUNY released a report claiming scientific misconduct by Wang could not be proven. The DOJ dropped the charges shortly before trial was scheduled to begin, without giving a reason.

=== Citizen petition to the FDA ===
In August 2021, the Food and Drug Administration (FDA) received a citizen petition–filed on behalf of two whistleblowers—alleging concerns about unreliable research and potential data manipulation in Cassava Science's preclinical research for the experimental drug. The petition was submitted by Jordan A. Thomas, who was then with the law firm Labaton Sucharow in New York City, and requested that the FDA halt the clinical trials until the issues could be resolved. According to Compliance Week, Thomas certified that the petition included "information known to the petitioner which are unfavorable to the petition". The company maintained that the claims about the research data were "outlandish" and said the FDA's process had been used abusively. The company's stock value dropped 55% after the petition was filed.

The petitioners who filed the FDA complaint were identified months later, in November 2021, as neuroscientist David S. Bredt, and cardiologist Geoffrey Pitt, a professor at Weill Cornell Medical College. When the petition was filed, Bredt was an executive partner at a firm that raised investment capital for another biotechnology company working on Alzheimer's treatment. After examining the preclinical research papers, Bredt remarked that "they were making statements that were incompatible with biology and with pharmacology", and said that if the research was in fact legitimate, it should "win five Nobel Prizes". According to The Wall Street Journal, the companya's initial report that the reanalysis of simufilam's effectiveness was done by "an outside lab"—later revealed to be the CUNY lab of Wang, "a longtime paid consultant to the company"—was not revealed to investors; the news had led to a doubling of the company's stock price. Bredt and Pitt suspected the re-analysis had been done by Wang, which was later confirmed by Barbier. Barbier responded that Wang was not an employee, so he considered his lab separate. Among other methodological concerns, the petitioners suspected irregularities in Western blot images in papers by Wang and Burns, and were concerned that the 2020 "reanalysis" of findings by Wang had not been disclosed in the company's filings and that individuals enrolled in trials would be taking a drug that might not be safe. They shorted shares, expecting the price of its stock to drop once problems with the research were revealed. After the stock's precipitous drop caused by the FDA petition, it was revealed that they were short sellers; Compliance Week stated that Thomas had not revealed this information when he certified the citizen petition. Bloomberg News reported that the August selloff shares earned short sellers $100 million, and Compliance Week stated that Bredt and Pitt "potentially ... made millions".

The FDA rejected the petition in February 2022 because the requests were "not the appropriate subject of a citizen petition", saying also that the rejection was not "a decision by the agency to take or refrain from taking any action"; that is, the request that FDA conduct an investigation fell out of the purview of the citizen petition process.

In July 2022, Science journal's Piller identified Vanderbilt University neuroscientist Matthew Schrag as another whistleblower who examined images. Schrag reported to the NIH irregularities in 34 papers with authors linked to the company or its work, including Wang, Burns and advisor Steven Arnold, a Harvard University neurologist. Schrag was paid $18,000 by the petitioners' attorney for his hundreds of hours of analysis of the images. Piller contacted other experts who he said "generally agree" with Schrag's conclusions. After the SEC filed charges in September 2024, Schrag stated: "Now, there is strong evidence of corruption of the phase 2 trial data on which the phase 3 trials are based. Experimenting on many hundreds of people with memory problems in this context is highly unethical. These trials should be stopped."

A September 2022 FDA report was obtained under the US Freedom of Information Act; in March 2024, Piller called the report "damning", saying the FDA found a "litany of problems" that raise "questions about the credibility of claims by Wang and the company about simufilam".

On November 3, 2022, the company filed a defamation lawsuit in the United States District Court for the Southern District of New York against defendants Quintessential Capital Management LLC, Drs. David Bredt and Geoffrey Pitt and other short sellers. According to Bloomberg, the lawsuit claimed that defendants "orchestrated a smear campaign against the company that included more than 1,000 false and defamatory statements." On March 28, 2024, the judge dismissed the lawsuit, finding "that the majority of the defendants' statements were protected under the First Amendment as statements of opinion or scientific debate, and that the fraction of statements that were adequately alleged to be defamatory were not published with actual malice". The short-sellers had claimed that Wang's research on its experimental Alzheimer's drug was fabricated. The company refiled its suit against the four short-sellers in April 2024, but dropped the lawsuit in August after Wang was charged with submitting false data to the NIH.

=== Other investigations ===
Reuters reported in July 2022 that a criminal investigation of the company had been started by the DOJ. The Wall Street Journal stated in 2021 that the SEC, the NIH, and CUNY were investigating allegations of manipulated data. In October 2023, CUNY reported that they could obtain none of Wang's original data, which meant that they were unable to either prove or disprove allegations that the images were improperly manipulated; they paused the investigation a few weeks later over concerns about confidentiality and integrity of the process.

The company has denied any wrongdoing. Following Wang's June 2024 indictment, it issued a press release stating that, "Wang's work under these grants was related to the early development phases of the Company's drug candidate ... [he] had no involvement in the Company's Phase 3 clinical trials of simufilam." Kate Moss, attorney, stated via email to Reuters in July 2022 that "Cassava Sciences ... has never been charged with a crime, and for good reason – Cassava Sciences has never engaged in criminal conduct." Piller summarized an email from Barbier as saying the company had "hired investigators to review its work, provided 'nearly 100,000 pages of documents to an alphabet soup of outside investigative agencies,' and asked CUNY to investigate ... "

=== Other concerns raised ===
A New York Times article stated in April 2022 that "many scientists have been deeply skeptical of the company's claims, asserting that Cassava's studies were flawed, its methods opaque and its results improbable". Robert Howard, professor of psychiatry at the University College London, remarked that the lack of placebo and small sample size meant research conclusions were "implausible" at the least. Elisabeth Bik, image-manipulation consultant, agreed to the citizen petition and alleged data errors and inconsistencies in the publications, identifying potential irregularities consistent with instances of copy and paste across different experiments. Thomas C. Südhof, Nobel laureate neuroscientist at Stanford University, also commented: "The overall conclusions with regard to Alzheimer's disease make no sense to me whatsoever... [The findings of Cassava Sciences] are not in the mainstream of the field, and to me they seem implausible and contrived."

=== Journal investigations ===
Several journal papers involving Cassava work and collaborators have been re-examined by their publishers.

Following the public controversies, The Journal of Neuroscience reassessed the 2012 paper that described simufilam binding to FLNA. The journal published a correction along with the original images in December 2021 remarking that the "error does not affect the conclusions of the article". After further data concerns were brought to the attention of the journal, it issued an expression of concern stating that the issue was under investigation by CUNY, and that the journal would "await the outcome of that investigation before taking further action".

The journal Neurobiology of Aging found "no compelling evidence of data manipulation intended to misrepresent the results", but issued an expression of concern on a 2017 paper, saying they identified multiple errors. The journal issued a correction and indicated that its final decision awaited conclusions from the CUNY investigation.

The Journal of Prevention of Alzheimer's Disease investigated a 2020 simufilam-related paper, also co-authored by Wang, and decided to take no action. Its editor reported finding "no convincing evidence of manipulation of data or intent to mislead".

PLOS One re-examined Wang's research papers in March 2020 and found problems with data integrity that were not resolved. Five of Wang's papers were retracted, two of which were co-authored with Burns that include the original papers on the discovery of FLNA binding as it relates to opioid receptor signaling. The FLNA retraction notices mention "vertical irregularities suggestive of splice lines" and that the "pixel patterns in background areas of blot images ... appear more similar than would be expected". The notices state: "The data and comments provided did not resolve the concerns about the integrity and reliability of data presented in this article."

A 2005 Neuroscience journal article on opioid tolerance was co-authored by Burns, Wang and others. According to Piller, Cassava has stated that the journal found no manipulation of images, but said the journal would respond to any new concerns based on the CUNY investigation.

The company advisors Wang and Arnold were co-authors on a highly-cited 2012 paper in the Journal of Clinical Investigation (JCI); Piller states that it forms a key part of the company's position that simufilam reduces resistance to insulin. He writes that the paper relied on a method of analyzing how brain tissue "purportedly generates chemical signals"; Schrag found no indication the work, which he says "contradicts basic neurobiology", had been replicated. He sent two groups of images to JCI; the editor responded that they did not investigate further after examination of one of the groups did not corroborate Schrag's analysis. A group of four whistle-blowers also submitted concerns about the paper starting in August 2021. The four whistleblowers were independent of the two that filed the FDA petition, but they were also holding short positions in the company. JCI's investigation did not corroborate their concerns about the paper.
