= Karen Ashe =

American academic

- Born: circa 1955; United States
- Occupation: Neuroscientist
- Years active: 1981–present
- Known for: Alzheimer's disease research

Karen K. Hsiao Ashe is a professor at the Department of Neurology and Neuroscience at the University of Minnesota (UMN) Medical School, where she holds the Edmund Wallace and Anne Marie Tulloch Chairs in Neurology and Neuroscience. She is the founding director of the N. Bud Grossman Center for Memory Research and Care, and her specific research interest is memory loss resulting from Alzheimer's disease and related dementias. Her research has included the development of an animal model of Alzheimer's.

In July 2022, concerns were raised that certain images in a 2006 Nature paper co-authored by Ashe and her postdoctoral student Sylvain Lesné were manipulated. In May 2023, the Star Tribune reported that Ashe was using new techniques to re-do the work reported in the 2006 Nature study, this time without Lesné, and that she stated "it's my responsibility to establish the truth of what we've published". The new article was published in March 2024. The 2006 article was retracted in June 2024; all of the original authors except Lesné agreed with the retraction.

== Personal life and education ==
Ashe's parents came to the United States from China in 1943 to pursue PhDs, before settling in the Minneapolis–Saint Paul area. Her father, C.C. Hsiao, taught aerospace engineering at the University of Minnesota, and her mother, Joyce, was a biochemist. She has three younger siblings.

Attending the St. Paul Academy and Summit School in the 1970s, Ashe's interest in the brain began in primary school, where she excelled in math, along with music. She obtained her undergraduate degree at Harvard University in 1975 in chemistry and physics, starting as a sophomore at the age of 17. She went on to earn her PhD in brain and cognitive sciences at MIT in 1981 and her MD from Harvard in 1982.

Ashe's husband, James, is a neurologist; she has three children (two sons and a daughter).

== Professional life ==
=== Early career ===
Between 1986 and 1989, she was a post-doctoral fellow at the University of California, San Francisco where she researched prion diseases and published with Stanley Prusiner. In 1989, she was the first author on a paper published in Nature, entitled "Linkage of a prion protein missense variant to Gerstmann‑Sträussler syndrome", describing the discovery of a mutation linked to a neurodegenerative disease. She was the first author on a paper published in 1990 in Science, entitled "Spontaneous neurodegeneration in transgenic mice with mutant prion protein", describing the creation of a transgenic mouse modeling a neurodegenerative disease. According to the Minneapolis Star Tribune, she helped prove Prusiner's theory that prions cause neurodegenerative diseases. Prusiner recognized her contribution towards the Nobel Prize he won for that work, saying that Karen Hsiao "discovered a mutation in the PrP gene that caused familial disease and reproduced the disease in transgenic mice".

=== Minnesota ===
Ashe joined the University of Minnesota Medical School in 1992 as an assistant professor of neurology. She has also worked with the Minneapolis Veterans Affairs Health Care System. She was the founding director of the N. Bud Grossman Center for Memory Research and Care. As of 2022, she has received over $28 million in grants from the U.S. National Institutes of Health.

The Minneapolis Star Tribune described Ashe as a "distinguished professor considered by many to be on the short list for a Nobel Prize for her work".

=== Alzheimer's research ===
==== Amyloid-beta protein ====
In 1996—early in her career at UMN—Ashe was the first author on a paper published in Science, entitled "Correlative memory deficits, Aβ elevation, and amyloid plaques in transgenic mice", describing a mouse model of Alzheimer's disease, which furthered her rising star as a scientist; the mice are used in research around the world, and students and scientists "come from all over the world to work with her", according to the Star Tribune. In 2006, three of her research papers made a list of the eighteen papers that had contributed the most to Alzheimer's research.

Ashe is a co-author on a 2006 paper published in Nature (retracted in 2024), entitled "A specific amyloid-β protein assembly in the brain impairs memory". The paper describes the Aβ*56 oligomer (known as amyloid beta star 56 and Aβ*56) correlating with memory loss in mice prior to the appearance of amyloid plaques. According to a Science article, in 2022 the paper was the fifth-highest cited paper in Alzheimer's research, with approximately 2,300 other articles citing it. The Guardian says the paper was "highly influential" and calls it "one of the most cited pieces of Alzheimer's disease research in the last two decades", writing that it has "dominated the field" of research. The Daily Telegraph states that the "seminal research paper" led to increased drug research funding worldwide. The paper was discussed at the Alzheimer Research Forum as a "star is born".

In 2015, Ashe was a co-author on a paper entitled "Quaternary structure defines a large class of amyloid-beta oligomers neutralized by sequestration", which defines two forms of Aβ based on quaternary structure, type 1 and type 2, that have different effects on memory function in mice. Type 1 is dispersed in the brain and associated with impaired memory. Type 2 is entrapped in amyloid plaques and does not impair memory. In 2020, she published a review summarizing this work, entitled "The biogenesis and biology of amyloid β oligomers in the brain".

==== 2022 investigation ====
In July 2022, concerns were raised by Matthew Schrag, a Vanderbilt University neuroscientist, that certain images in the 2006 Nature paper were manipulated in the paper co-authored by Ashe's postdoctoral Sylvain Lesné, whom she hired in 2002. These concerns were published in an article in Science authored by Charles Piller which questioned the association between the Aβ*56 protein and dementia symptoms. Ashe stated in July 2022 via email that "it is devastating to discover that a colleague may have misled me and the scientific community [... it is also] distressing that a major scientific journal has blatantly misrepresented the implications of my work." (Note: See also Ashe's July 22 response posted on the Alzheimer Research Forum, referencing "allegations about images that may have been inappropriately altered by my former co-worker Dr. Sylvain Lesné.") Ashe has stated that the edited images, which she agrees "should not have occurred", do not change the conclusions of the paper. No image inconsistencies have been found in other work published by Ashe without Lesné as a co-author.

UMN is investigating the reports as of May 2023. The editors of Nature responded with a July 14, 2022 note stating they were aware of and investigating the concerns raised, that a "further editorial response [would] follow as soon as possible", and that "readers are advised to use caution when using results reported therein". The NIH, where Schrag lodged the whistleblower report, is also investigating the matter. Retraction Watch states that Ashe co-authored with Lesné other disputed papers, and that the authors in the disputed work do not overlap except for two from UMN Department of Neuroscience.

==== 2024 retraction ====
In May 2023, the Star Tribune reported that Ashe was using new techniques to re-do the work reported in the 2006 Nature study, this time without Lesné, and that she stated "it's my responsibility to establish the truth of what we've published". Ashe's new article was published in March 2024 in the journal iScience.

In May 2024, Ashe announced that the 2006 publication would be retracted because Nature would not print a correction. According to Retraction Watch, this makes it one of the most highly cited paper ever retracted. Piller reported in Science that Ashe "and colleagues claim to confirm the findings of the 2006 paper", and Ashe states that "the manipulated images did not affect the study conclusions". All of the original authors except Lesné agreed to the June 2024 retraction; other researchers dispute the strength of conclusions in the new, re-worked study.

== Honors and awards ==
Ashe was awarded the Metlife Foundation Award for Medical Research in Alzheimer's Disease in 2005. Ashe also earned the Potamkin Prize in 2006 for her Alzheimer's research, shortly after the publication of the 2006 Nature paper.

In 2009, Ashe was elected to the National Academy of Medicine for her achievements in medicine.

== Selected publications ==
- Hsiao K, Baker HF, Crow TJ, Poulter M, Owen F, Terwilliger JD, Westaway D, Ott J, Prusiner SB (March 1989). "Linkage of a prion protein missense variant to Gerstmann-Sträussler syndrome". Nature. 338 (6213): 342–345. Bibcode:1989Natur.338..342H. doi:10.1038/338342a0. PMID 2564168. S2CID 4319741.
- Hsiao KK, Scott M, Foster D, Groth DF, DeArmond SJ, Prusiner SB (December 1990). "Spontaneous neurodegeneration in transgenic mice with mutant prion protein". Science. 250 (4987): 1587–1590. Bibcode:1990Sci...250.1587H. doi:10.1126/science.1980379. PMID 1980379. S2CID 45517405.
- Hsiao K, Meiner Z, Kahana E, Cass C, Kahana I, Avrahami D, Scarlato G, Abramsky O, Prusiner SB, Gabizon R (April 1991). "Mutation of the prion protein in Libyan Jews with Creutzfeldt-Jakob disease". N Engl J Med. 324 (16): 1091–1097. doi:10.1056/NEJM199104183241604. PMID 2008182.
- Hsiao KK, Borchelt DR, Olson K, Johannsdottir R, Kitt C, Yunis W, Xu S, Eckman C, Younkin S, Price D (November 1995). "Age-related CNS disorder and early death in transgenic FVB/N mice overexpressing Alzheimer amyloid precursor proteins". Neuron. 15 (5): 1203–1218. doi:10.1016/0896-6273(95)90107-8. PMID 7576662. S2CID 13899338.
- Hsiao K, Chapman P, Nilsen S, Eckman C, Harigaya Y, Younkin S, Yang F, Cole G (October 1996). "Correlative memory deficits, Abeta elevation, and amyloid plaques in transgenic mice". Science. 274 (5284): 99–102. Bibcode:1996Sci...274...99H. doi:10.1126/science.274.5284.99. PMID 8810256. S2CID 32419070.
- Chapman PF, White GL, Jones MW, Cooper-Blacketer D, Marshall VJ, Irizarry M, Younkin L, Good MA, Bliss TV, Hyman BT, Younkin SG, Hsiao KK (March 1999). "Impaired synaptic plasticity and learning in aged amyloid precursor protein transgenic mice". Nat Neurosci. 2 (3): 271–276. doi:10.1038/6374. PMID 10195221. S2CID 8318335.
- Westerman MA, Cooper-Blacketer D, Mariash A, Kotilinek L, Kawarabayashi T, Younkin LH, Carlson GA, Younkin SG, Ashe KH (March 2002). "The relationship between Abeta and memory in the Tg2576 mouse model of Alzheimer's disease". J Neurosci. 22 (5): 1858–1867. doi:10.1523/JNEUROSCI.22-05-01858.2002. PMC 6758862. PMID 11880515.
- Kotilinek LA, Bacskai B, Westerman M, Kawarabayashi T, Younkin L, Hyman BT, Younkin S, Ashe KH (August 2002). "Reversible memory loss in a mouse transgenic model of Alzheimer's disease". J Neurosci. 22 (15): 6331–6335. doi:10.1523/JNEUROSCI.22-15-06331.2002. PMC 6758140. PMID 12151510.
- Cleary JP, Walsh DM, Hofmeister JJ, Shankar GM, Kuskowski MA, Selkoe DJ, Ashe KH (January 2005). "Natural oligomers of the amyloid-beta protein specifically disrupt cognitive function". Nat Neurosci. 8 (1): 79–84. doi:10.1038/nn1372. PMID 15608634. S2CID 13400377.
- Santacruz K, Lewis J, Spires T, Paulson J, Kotilinek L, Ingelsson M, Guimaraes A, DeTure M, Ramsden M, McGowan E, Forster C, Yue M, Orne J, Janus C, Mariash A, Kuskowski M, Hyman B, Hutton M, Ashe KH (July 2005). "Tau suppression in a neurodegenerative mouse model improves memory function". Science. 309 (5733): 476–481. Bibcode:2005Sci...309..476S. doi:10.1126/science.1113694. PMC 1574647. PMID 16020737.
- The paper questioned in the 2022 investigation: Lesné S, Koh MT, Kotilinek L, Kayed R, Glabe CG, Yang A, Gallagher M, Ashe KH (March 2006). "A specific amyloid-beta protein assembly in the brain impairs memory". Nature. 440 (7082): 352–357. Bibcode:2006Natur.440..352L. doi:10.1038/nature04533. PMID 16541076. S2CID 4407385. (Retracted, see doi:10.1038/s41586-024-07691-8, PMID 38914864)
- Liu P, Reed MN, Kotilinek LA, Grant MK, Forster CL, Qiang W, Shapiro SL, Reichl JH, Chiang AC, Jankowsky JL, Wilmot CM, Cleary JP, Zahs KR, Ashe KH (June 2015). "Quaternary Structure Defines a Large Class of Amyloid-β Oligomers Neutralized by Sequestration". Cell Rep. 11 (11): 1760–1771. doi:10.1016/j.celrep.2015.05.021. PMC 4494129. PMID 26051935.
- Zhao X, Kotilinek LA, Smith B, Hlynialuk C, Zahs K, Ramsden M, Cleary J, Ashe KH (November 2016). "Caspase-2 cleavage of tau reversibly impairs memory". Nat Med. 22 (11): 1268–1276. doi:10.1038/nm.4199. PMID 27723722. S2CID 3441471.
