= David S. Bredt =

American molecular neuroscientist

David S. Bredt is an American molecular neuroscientist.

After studies in chemistry at Princeton, Bredt studied medicine at Johns Hopkins School of Medicine where he obtained M.D and Ph.D degrees. He was a student of Solomon H. Snyder, with whom he also co-authored several widely cited papers.

He worked as a postdoctoral fellow in the Department of Neuroscience at Johns Hopkins from 1993 to 1994. He became a 1995 Searle scholar, and received a 1997 Beckman Young Investigators Award.

He worked at the University of California, San Francisco Medical school from 1994 to 2004, first as an assistant professor, later as professor of physiology.

He served as vice president of integrative biology at Eli Lilly and Company from 2004 to 2011. He was elected to the Johns Hopkins University Society of Scholars in 2005.

He worked at Johnson & Johnson from 2011 to 2021 as global head of neuroscience discovery.

== Work ==
=== Identification of NO synthase and roles for NO in brain and skeletal muscle ===
While a graduate student in Prof. Solomon Snyder's lab, Bredt discovered and characterized the family of enzymes that generate nitric oxide (NO). Whereas a single measurement of endogenous NO had previously required complex and laborious methods, Bredt developed a simple, sensitive, and specific assay that monitored the conversion of [^{3}H]arginine to [^{3}H]citrulline. This assay enabled hundreds or thousands of daily measurements of endogenous NO. He first employed this assay to discover that endogenous NO mediates glutamate-linked increases of cyclic GMP in brain (PNAS, 1989). He then biochemically isolated the biosynthetic enzyme, which he named nitric oxide synthase (NOS). In addition, he determined that NOS is a calmodulin-dependent enzyme (PNAS, 1990), which explained how NO is generated rapidly following glutamate-mediated increases in synaptic calcium.

Bredt performed studies that established NO as a diffusible neurotransmitter. He molecularly cloned and sequenced the first NOS cDNA (Nature, 1991), which showed that the N-terminal half of NOS protein is unique and is separated by a calmodulin-binding domain from the C-terminal half, which resembles cytochrome P-450 reductase (Nature, 1991). This protein structure revealed how calmodulin regulates NOS enzyme activity and how redox co-factors enable the complex enzymology of NOS. He immunohistochemically mapped NOS distribution in brain and peripheral tissues (Nature, 1990). He determined that neurons are the primary source of NO throughout the body. In the brain, he found that NOS found in neurons (nNOS) was enriched in specific neuronal populations, and often concentrated at postsynaptic sites, such as cerebellar glomerular synapses, where glutamate receptors activate nNOS. In the peripheral nervous system, he found nNOS enriched in non-adrenergic, non-cholinergic neurons that innervate gastrointestinal and vascular smooth muscle (Nature, 1990). These findings opened a gateway to investigating how NO participates in diverse physiology processes including aspects of peristalsis and penile erection (Science, 1992).

As a professor at UCSF, Bredt identified the therapeutic potential of modulating NO in brain and skeletal muscle. In brain, Bredt and his team demonstrated that nNOS is enriched at synapses owing to a "PDZ" domain in nNOS that associates with a similar PDZ domain in the synaptic scaffolding protein postsynaptic density 95kD (PSD-95) (Cell, 1996). They showed that PSD-95 physically and functionally links nNOS with NMDA-type glutamate receptors at synapses. As excitotoxic neuronal death associated with cerebral ischemia involves excessive NO production downstream of NMDA receptors (PNAS, 1991), Bredt's research pointed to exploitation of the antagonism of the NMDA receptor/PSD-95/nNOS complex as a stroke treatment (Journal of Biological Chemistry, 1999), which has shown promising clinical outcomes (Nature Reviews Drug Discovery, 2020).

In addition to finding nNOS in neurons, Bredt helped identify nNOS on skeletal muscle sarcolemma (Nature, 1994), and his team determined that nNOS in muscle associates with dystrophin (Cell, 1995). They discovered a selective loss of nNOS from skeletal muscle sarcolemma in patients with Duchenne and Becker dystrophies, which involve dystrophin mutations (Journal of Experimental Medicine, 1996). Bredt's team discovered the mechanism by which nNOS is lost from skeletal muscle sarcolemma by identifying that the PDZ domain in nNOS binds to the PDZ in the dystrophin-associated protein syntrophin (Cell, 1996). Through collaboration, they determined the structural correlate to this unexpected PDZ-PDZ interaction (Science, 1999). Today, restoration of NO bioactivity in muscular dystrophies remains a key therapeutic goal.

=== Protein scaffolding and palmitoylation underlying synaptic signaling and plasticity ===
Bredt has made contributions to understanding the molecular organization and stability of excitatory synapses. Biochemical studies by Bredt's team determined that PSD-95 is amongst the most abundant palmitoylated proteins in brain (Neuron, 1998), and that palmitoylation localizes PSD-95 to synaptic sites (Neuron, 1999). They found that synaptic function is regulated dynamically by palmitate cycling on PSD-95 (Cell, 2002). They characterized a family of 24 palmitoyl-transferase enzymes and identified those responsible for regulating PSD-95 (Neuron, 2004). They found that palmitoylated PSD-95 powerfully regulates maturation of excitatory synapses and enhances AMPA receptor clustering (Science, 2000). These discoveries are central to current models of synaptic development, anatomy, and plasticity.

=== TARPs as auxiliary subunits for a neurotransmitter receptor ===
Bredt, together with Prof. Roger Nicoll, discovered and characterized the first auxiliary subunits for mammalian glutamate neurotransmitter receptor. Bredt and Nicoll determined that a then recently discovered protein, stargazin, links PSD-95 to the α-amino-3-hydroxy-5-methyl-4-isoxazolepropionic acid (AMPA) subclass of glutamate receptors (Nature, 2000). Stargazin is one member of a family of related proteins, which Bredt termed transmembrane AMPAR regulatory proteins (TARPs), that are differentially distributed in brain (Journal of Cell Biology, 2003). Bredt and Nicoll found that stargazin and related TARPs regulate the synaptic targeting (Nature, 2000), gating (Nature, 2005), and pharmacology (PNAS, 2006) of all AMPA receptors. TARPs not only mediate synaptic function but also bidirectionally regulate synaptic plasticity (Neuron, 2005). This led to the conceptual breakthrough that TARPs are AMPA receptor auxiliary subunits (PNAS, 2005). This model was initially met with resistance, but it is now recognized that ionotropic receptors for many neurotransmitters have auxiliary subunits.

=== NACHO as a chaperone for a mammalian neurotransmitter receptor ===
Bredt's team at Janssen assessed whether analogous protein accessories might enable drug discovery for previously intractable and medically-important nicotinic acetylcholine receptors (nAChRs). Whereas cDNAs encoding nAChRs were discovered in the 1980s, most nAChR subtypes could not be expressed functionally in cell lines. In a study, Bredt's team used an innovative genome-wide cloning strategy to search systemically for neuronal proteins that could reconstitute the α7 nAChR subtype. They found that assembly of α7 nAChRs requires a novel endoplasmic reticulum protein that Bredt named "nAChR regulator chaperone" (NACHO) (Neuron, 2016), the first client-specific chaperone for a mammalian neurotransmitter receptor family (Cell Reports, 2017). His team found that NACHO engages N‐glycosylation and endoplasmic reticulum chaperone pathways for Alpha-7 nicotinic receptor oligomerization and membrane trafficking (Cell Reports, 2020). By exploiting their genome-wide screening paradigm, they also found an array of other neuronal proteins including Bcl-2 (Nature Communications, 2019), spermidine/spermine N1-acetyltransferase (Nature Communications, 2020) and BARP (Cell Reports, 2019) that conspire with NACHO for functional expression of diverse nACh receptors in brain and peripheral tissues. These discoveries are now enabling biochemical and pharmaceutical studies of limbic α6-containing receptors for psychiatric indications (Cell Reports, 2019), sensory α6-containing receptors for chronic pain (Journal of Clinical Investigation, 2020) and cochlear α9α10 receptors for auditory disorders (PNAS, 2020).

Taken together, Bredt's discoveries have illuminated unanticipated mediators and mechanisms for neuronal communication. His conceptional advances in neurotransmitter receptor biology have translated into new approaches for treating neuromuscular, neurological, and neuropsychiatric disorders. His papers have been cited more than 75,000 times in the literature.

== Cassava Sciences ==
On November 17, 2021, The Wall Street Journal identified Dr. Bredt as co-author of an anonymous FDA citizen petition to halt phase 3 trials of simufilam, a drug from Cassava Sciences which targets protein misfolding for treatment of Alzheimer's disease. Labaton Sucharow, the law firm filing the petition, acknowledged its clients had taken short positions in the company before the citizen petition, as its clients believed that data had been manipulated in publications and submissions to the FDA The FDA on Feb. 10 closed the petition by stating that "your Petitions are being denied solely on the grounds that your requests are not the appropriate subject of a citizen petition. This response does not represent a decision by the Agency to take or refrain from taking any action relating to the subject matter of your Petitions." On March 30, 2022, PLOS ONE retracted five papers from Cassava's scientific key advisor including two papers co-authored by Cassava's vice president of neuroscience. On April 18, 2022, The New York Times published an expose citing nine prominent scientists who questioned the data behind Cassava's drug. On November 3, 2022, Cassava Sciences filed a lawsuit in federal court against a group that includes Bredt, who Cassava alleges are conducting a "short and distort" campaign, in an effort to "manipulate a stock price and financially benefit from their 'short positions' by defaming a company developing a drug for people with Alzheimer's disease."

However, on Oct. 12, 2023, Science published an article stating a City University of New York researcher associated with the research program for simufilam had been subject to an investigation by university officials for possible data manipulation. The article stated that the investigators "found evidence highly suggestive of deliberate scientific misconduct" from City University of New York professor Hoau-Yan Wang. In June 2024, Wang was indicted last year in U.S. District Court for the District of Maryland on felony charges of major fraud against the United States, wire fraud and making false statements.

In September 2024, the U.S. Securities and Exchange Commission filed securities fraud claims against Cassava, its former CEO Remi Barbier and its former Senior Vice President of Neuroscience Dr. Lindsay Burns. Cassava agreed to pay a $40 million civil penalty, and Barbier and Burns agreed to $175,000 and $40,000 penalties, respectively, to settle the SEC's claims.

== Selected papers ==
- Isolation of nitric oxide synthetase, a calmodulin-requiring enzyme PNAS, January 1, 1991, vol 87.
- Localization of nitric oxide synthase indicating a neural role for nitric oxide Nature 347, 768 - 770 (25 October 1990).
- Nitric oxide mediates glutamate-linked enhancement of cGMP levels in the cerebellum PNAS, 1 November 1989, vol 86.
- Nitric oxide synthase complexed with dystrophin and absent from skeletal muscle sarcolemma in Duchenne muscular dystrophy Cell, Sept. 8, 1995
- Auxiliary subunits assist AMPA-type glutamate receptors Science March 3, 2006
- Nicotinic acetylcholine receptor redux: Discovery of accessories opens therapeutic vistas August 13, 2021
