= Doctored =

2025 non-fiction book

Doctored: Fraud, Arrogance, and Tragedy in the Quest to Cure Alzheimer's
- Author: Charles Piller
- Language: English
- Subject: Alzheimer's disease research
- Genre: Non-fiction
- Publisher: Atria/One Signal Publishers
- Publication date: February 4, 2025
- Publication place: United States
- Media type: Print (Hardback)
- Pages: 352
- ISBN: 9781668031247
- OCLC: 1484074731

Doctored: Fraud, Arrogance, and Tragedy in the Quest to Cure Alzheimer's is a 2025 non-fiction book by investigative journalist Charles Piller about scientific misconduct in Alzheimer's disease research.

== Synopsis ==
Doctored explores alleged image manipulation in studies used to promote simufilam as an Alzheimer's treatment as well as the retraction of Sylvain Lesné's seminal research supporting the amyloid hypothesis.

== Reception ==
Publishers Weekly characterized Doctored as "a troubling look at the corruption of Big Science." Rhys Blakely of The Times described the book as "rigorous and sobering". Pharmacologist Csaba Szabo of the University of Fribourg praised the book as "essential reading for every biomedical scientist", saying that it is "particularly important for those in the broader scientific community who still regard fraud and bias as isolated incidents rather than systemic problems. It should also be required reading for policymakers, funders, and journal editors—those who hold the power to implement reforms but often remain oblivious to the scale of misconduct. Perhaps most importantly, it should be read by patients and their families, who deserve to know the truth about the treatments they are offered and the corporate and scientific forces shaping them." Neurologist Joseph H. Friedman of the Alpert Medical School wrote that the book "reveals a worrisome picture".

James Ball of The Guardian praised the depth of Piller's reporting, calling the book "compulsory reading" for science policymakers, but described some portions of the writing as "repetitive and frustrating". Aaron Rothstein of the Wall Street Journal praised Piller's "dramatic and damning investigation of scientific transgression", while saying that the book "sometimes attempts to do too much—diving into scientific theories about the causes of Alzheimer’s, for example." Neuroscientist Timothy Daly of the University of Bordeaux wrote that the book was "a must-read for anyone interested in the quantity and quality of efforts to get drugs to market," but criticised the book for its "hero-and-villain framing of sleuthing" instead of taking a more structural approach. Editor-in-chief of The Lancet Richard Horton criticised that "Piller’s strategy of choosing execrable cases to prove his hypothesis overlooks decades of research supporting a role for amyloid in Alzheimer’s pathogenesis... his attempts to undermine the reputation of scientists feels cheap, even McCarthyite," but that "he does raise questions that scientists and journal editors should be prepared to answer."

Geneticist John Hardy of University College London criticised the book, saying that "a book that discusses why a scientist might consider fraud, and how it could be achieved, would be very welcome, but apart from mention of the difficulties faced by whistleblowers, Piller does not provide such analysis." Neurologist Jason Karlawish of the University of Pennsylvania Health System argued that "the facts don't support Piller's message. It's sensational, and in my experience, it's causing harm," saying that although the individual cases were compelling, to generalise the message to all anti-amyloid drugs was "a vast overreach" and that he had witnessed patients drop out of anti-amyloid drug treatments and trials due to the book. Neuroscientist Bruce Lamb of Indiana University also criticised the book for generalising individual cases to the entire field of Alzheimer's research, saying that "in science, theories about the causes of disease and the development of treatments are never the work of a single person."
