= Sylvain Lesné =

French neuroscientist (born 1974)

Sylvain E. Lesné (born 1974) is a French neuroscientist and former associate professor at the Department of Neuroscience at the University of Minnesota (UMN) Medical School, known for his research in Alzheimer's disease. He is the primary author of a controversial 2006 Nature paper, "A specific amyloid-β protein assembly in the brain impairs memory". Lesné's work in the 2006 publication and others has been investigated since June 2022 on charges that he manipulated images to inflate the role of Aβ*56 in Alzheimer's. Retracted in 2024, the paper was foundational in the hypothesis that one specific toxic oligomer of the amyloid beta protein, known as Aβ*56, caused memory impairment in Alzheimer's, aligned with the prevailing amyloid hypothesis.

Karen Ashe, the senior author of the 2006 Nature paper – and all authors except Lesné – agreed to retract the paper which, according to Retraction Watch, makes it the second most highly cited paper ever retracted. Responses from other researchers indicated that, while the allegations were significant, the overall impact on amyloid research was small and most Alzheimer's research was not compromised. Other researchers disagreed, and expressed concerns that the doctored images raised doubts about the amyloid hypothesis.

Lesné resigned from his tenured position at UMN effective March 1, 2025.

== Personal life and education ==
Sylvain E. Lesné was born in 1974 and raised in Luc-sur-Mer, a small town in the Normandy region in northwestern France. His parents are Bertrand and Marie Carmen Lesné.

Lesné holds a master's degree in biochemistry and has a PhD with a major in neuroscience from the University of Caen Normandy. His doctoral thesis (2002) was "Régulation d'expression et du métabolisme d'APP au cours des pathologies dégénératives" (Regulation of APP expression and metabolism during degenerative pathologies).

Jill Caroline, a Minnesota psychologist and special educator, and Lesné were married in Beauvoir-sur-Mer, France on August 14, 2010.

== Early career ==
Denis Vivien, a French cell biologist and neuroscience professor who oversaw Lesné's doctoral work and published with Lesné, says Lesné produced some immunostaining images which Vivien thought suspect; others were unable to replicate Lesné's data. Vivien withdrew a paper that was to be published with Lesné, and told Le Monde in 2022 that he had long ago ceased having any personal or scientific contact with Lesné.

== University of Minnesota ==
After graduating from university, Lesné was hired in 2002 as a post-doctoral research associate by Karen Ashe at the University of Minnesota. The Minneapolis Star Tribune described Ashe as a "distinguished professor considered by many to be on the short list for a Nobel Prize for her work". Ashe in turn has described Lesné as her "brilliant postdoctoral fellow"; he had claimed to have developed a means of measuring amyloid beta (Aβ) oligomer proteins separately inside and outside of cells. Dennis J. Selkoe, another Alzheimer's researcher, has questioned this method, saying that "it made no biochemical sense".

Since 2009, Lesné had a laboratory at the UMN funded by National Institutes of Health (NIH). He received $774,000 in NIH grants to study Aβ*56 through 2012, in addition to over $7 million for Alzheimer's research through 2022. (Note: See Reporter.nih.gov Advanced search for NIH grants totaling $7,997,415 with Lesné listed as principal investigator.)

Lesné was named an associate professor in the Neuroscience Department in 2016, and given tenure according to the Lesné Lab website. He was an associate director at the UMN's N. Bud Grossman Center for Memory Research and Care, where Ashe serves as director. As of 2024, he was a scholar at the UMN's Institute for Translational Neuroscience.

Lesné resigned from his tenured position at UMN effective March 1, 2025, after a UMN investigation flagged "data integrity" concerns in other articles he authored.

=== Alzheimer's research ===
Lesné is the lead author, with Ashe and others as co-authors, of a controversial 2006 report published in Nature. The paper, "A specific amyloid-β protein assembly in the brain impairs memory", suggested the Aβ*56 oligomer (known as amyloid beta star 56 and Abeta*56) as a cause of Alzheimer's disease. The study proposed that Aβ*56 was responsible for the memory deficits that occur in Alzheimer's. According to the Star Tribune, images from the study showed the Aβ*56 protein growing as mice began to decline and age with dementia.

Science says it was the fifth-highest cited paper in Alzheimer's research as of early 2022, with approximately 2,300 other articles citing it. The Guardian says the paper was "highly influential" and calls it "one of the most cited pieces of Alzheimer's disease research in the last two decades", writing that it has "dominated the field" of research. The Atlantic likens publication in Nature to a "career high-water mark", reflecting especially important findings. The Daily Telegraph states that the "seminal research paper" led to increased drug research funding worldwide. For the paper, Lesné was listed as of May 13, 2022 at UMN Medical School's Wall of Scholarship recognizing faculty who "must have first or last author credits on a publication that has been cited at least 1,000 times". (Note: The UMN Medical School Wall of Scholarship webpage does not list Lesné as of July 28, 2022.)

Other scientists have not been able to replicate the results specific to Aβ*56 and whether it exists is questioned; several Alzheimer's researchers stated in July 2022 on the website Alzforum that they have long been skeptical of the Aβ*56 findings. Frédéric Checler, a lab director at the Institute of Molecular and Cellular Pharmacology in Sophia Antipolis, France, told Le Monde in 2022 that the 2006 Nature publication raised suspicions early on, saying: "It is extremely difficult to obtain a pure aggregate protein, and to be certain that its nature remains the same after its purification."

=== 2022 investigation ===
A July 2022 publication in Science authored by Charles Piller questioned the authenticity of Western blot images used in Lesné's research; Piller's report alleges, based on a six-month investigation, that images may have been doctored to emphasize the role of Aβ*56 in Alzheimer's. Matthew Schrag, a Vanderbilt University neuroscientist, raised concerns in a whistleblower report that images were falsified, casting doubt on the association between the Aβ*56 protein and dementia symptoms. Schrag told USA Today the images had similarities to what one would expect from software like Photoshop.

The editors of Nature responded with a July 14, 2022 note stating that they were aware of and investigating the concerns and that "readers are advised to use caution when using results reported therein". The NIH, where Schrag lodged the whistleblower report, is also investigating the matter, and could decide to pass it on the United States Office of Research Integrity if the complaints are found valid.

Lesné is the leading researcher overseeing or instigating the work in about ten disputed studies as of 2022; as of May 2023, according to the Minneapolis Star Tribune, images have been questioned on 20 articles he has authored. Another journal, Science Signaling, had issued two expressions of concern, (Note: Expression of concern June 21, 2022 for Amar F, Sherman MA, Rush T, Larson M, Boyle G, Chang L, Götz J, Buisson A, Lesné SE (May 2017). "The amyloid-β oligomer Aβ*56 induces specific alterations in neuronal signaling that lead to tau phosphorylation and aggregation". Sci Signal. 10 (478). doi:10.1126/scisignal.aal2021. PMC 5859319. PMID 28487416.) (Note: Expression of concern June 21, 2022 for Alfonso SI, Callender JA, Hooli B, Antal CE, Mullin K, Sherman MA, Lesné SE, Leitges M, Newton AC, Tanzi RE, Malinow R (May 2016). "Gain-of-function mutations in protein kinase Cα (PKCα) may promote synaptic defects in Alzheimer's disease". Sci Signal. 9 (427): ra47. doi:10.1126/scisignal.aaf6209. PMC 5154619. PMID 27165780.) and two other journals,The Journal of Neuroscience (Note: Erratum June 15, 2022 for Larson ME, Sherman MA, Greimel S, Kuskowski M, Schneider JA, Bennett DA, Lesné SE (July 2012). "Soluble α-synuclein is a novel modulator of Alzheimer's disease pathophysiology". J Neurosci. 32 (30): 10253–66. doi:10.1523/JNEUROSCI.0581-12.2012. PMC 3425439. PMID 22836259.) and Brain, (Note: Erratum May 13, 2022 for Lesné SE, Sherman MA, Grant M, Kuskowski M, Schneider JA, Bennett DA, Ashe KH (May 2013). "Brain amyloid-β oligomers in ageing and Alzheimer's disease". Brain. 136 (Pt 5): 1383–98. doi:10.1093/brain/awt062. PMC 3634198. PMID 23576130.) have issued corrections on articles associated with Lesné and his UMN co-workers. In December 2025, the article in Science Signaling, "The amyloid-β oligomer Aβ*56 induces specific alterations in neuronal signaling that lead to tau phosphorylation and aggregation" was retracted after a UMN investigation found the concerns about manipulated images were valid.

Retraction Watch states that Ashe co-authored some of the disputed papers, and that the authors in the disputed work do not overlap except for two from UMN Department of Neuroscience. On the corrected paper in Brain, Ashe and Lesné are the senior and first authors. Piller did not find the same image inconsistencies in other work published by Ashe or Vivien without Lesné as a co-author.

Lesné's work in the 2006 publication and others has been investigated since June 2022. Alzheimer's researcher John Forsayeth commented that Ashe had been guilty of a "major ethical lapse" in oversight of data and Dennis Selkoe, a Harvard Medical School neurologist, said he did not understand how Ashe failed to "hyperscrutinize" data considering reactions to the 2006 Nature report. Piller writes that Lesné's work was already being queried before his investigation, when other researchers were unable to replicate the results.

As of June 2024, Lesné had not commented. Ashe stated via email in 2022 that "it is devastating to discover that a colleague may have misled me and the scientific community ... [it is also] distressing that a major scientific journal has blatantly misrepresented the implications of my work." (Note: See also Ashe's July 22 response posted on the Alzheimer Research Forum, referencing "allegations about images that may have been inappropriately altered by my former co-worker Dr. Sylvain Lesné".) The Daily Telegraph states that the "authors of the Minnesota paper have defended their original findings" and support the role of amyloid as a cause of Alzheimer's. USA Today reported that Ashe had started the process to retract the Nature paper, but that had not been done as of July 29, 2022 because six of the eight co-authors would not sign off on the request. She stated via email that "... the figures in question were manipulated in a way that made them look nicer but did not affect one word in the paper". Defending the work, she said that the image adjustments "should not have occurred", but called them "non-material" and "inconsequential" to the research overall.

=== 2024 retraction ===
In May 2023, the Star Tribune reported that the senior author of the study, Karen Ashe, was using new techniques to re-do the work reported in the 2006 Nature study, this time without Lesné, and that she stated "it's my responsibility to establish the truth of what we've published". Ashe's new article was published in March 2024 in the journal iScience.

In May 2024, Ashe announced that the 2006 publication would be retracted, although she stated that the manipulated images did not affect the study's conclusions; according to Retraction Watch, this makes it the second most highly cited paper ever retracted. The only co-author who did not agree with retraction was Lesné. Nature published retraction of the article on June 24, 2024, noting that the edited images showed "excessive manipulation, including splicing, duplication and the use of an eraser tool".

==== Impact on Alzheimer's research ====
Responses from some researchers in 2022 indicated that, while the allegations were significant, the overall impact on amyloid research was small and most Alzheimer's research was not compromised. Other researchers disagreed, and expressed concerns that the doctored images raised doubts about the amyloid hypothesis.

If studies were manipulated, Jeremy Olson stated in 2022 in the Star Tribune that "thinking on the causes of the disease and dementia" could change. Olson wrote that the allegations "wouldn't scuttle the entire theory of amyloid proteins", but "Selkoe told Science that they undercut the existence of the Aβ*56 protein that is central to Lesné's research." A Massachusetts General Hospital researcher, Rudolph E. Tanzi, said the alleged manipulation "had virtually zero effect on progress" in Alzheimer's research and characterized statements about its effect on the overall field and the amyloid hypothesis as "hyperbole".

USA Today stated in 2022 that experts have "downplayed" the impact the Nature paper had on drug discovery research. Alzheimer's researchers or organizations from Australia, France, and the UK state that the general theory behind the amyloid hypothesis remains valid. Selkoe, who Science describes as "a leading advocate of the amyloid and toxic oligomer hypotheses", opined that the "broader amyloid hypothesis remains viable" and referred to the alleged image manipulation as "what really looks like a very egregious example of malfeasance that's squarely in the Aβ oligomer field".

Sara Imarisio of Alzheimer's Research UK said:

These allegations are extremely serious. ... The amyloid protein is at the centre of the most influential theory of how Alzheimer's disease develops in the brain. But the research that has been called into question is focused on a very specific type of amyloid, and these allegations do not compromise the vast majority of knowledge built up during decades of research into the role of this protein in the disease.

The U.S. National Institute on Aging issued a statement saying:

... the Aβ*56 oligomer was one of many being explored at the time ... immunotherapies targeting Aβ monomers (a single 'unit' of Aβ), other types of oligomers, and the longer amyloid fibrils have been the focus of studies ... there is still a strong scientific rationale for continuing to explore approaches that target different aspects and collections of the amyloid protein.

Following Lesné's 2025 resignation, Schrag was critical of the delay. According to Piller, Schrag stated: "Accountability [was] long overdue. The University of Minnesota's inconsistent, incomplete, and delayed actions have seriously harmed their reputation and done a disservice to the field of Alzheimer's research."

== Legacy ==
Writing in 2022 in The Atlantic, David Grimes commented that the Lesné matter exemplified the publish or perish dilemma, in which pressure to publish in academia can lead to wasted research dollars and inaccurate findings. A National Public Radio broadcast on the show All Things Considered linked instances of scientific misconduct to competition for funding.

In a February 13, 2025 book review of Charles Piller's Doctored: Fraud, Arrogance, and Tragedy in the Quest to Cure Alzheimer's, Carl Elliott wrote that "shocking was that some of Lesné's work had come from the lab of Karen Ashe, one of the most acclaimed neuroscientists in the field", noting that the University of Minnesota had the "dubious distinction of producing two of the five most highly cited scientific papers ever to be retracted" according to Retraction Watch.
