= Charles Piller =

American investigative journalist

Charles Piller is an American investigative journalist and author who writes for Science magazine as of 2024. He has published books on the history of both biological warfare and Alzheimer's disease.

== Journalism ==
Prior to writing at Science, Piller was an associate editor at Macworld magazine and wrote for the Los Angeles Times, the STAT website, and The Sacramento Bee. At the Times, he investigated the impact of the Bill & Melinda Gates Foundation on Africa.

In July 2022, he authored an article in Science that investigated allegations of research fraud at Cassava Sciences in the development of the drug simufilam, and questioned the authenticity of images used in Sylvain Lesné's research on Alzheimer's disease; Lesné was formerly at the University of Minnesota Medical School.

== Center for Public Integrity ==
Along with Charles Lewis and Alejandro Benes, Piller was a founding member of the Center for Public Integrity, where he served as board chair.

== Books ==
- Gene Wars: Military Control over the New Genetic Technologies (with Keith R. Yamamoto), 1988, Beech Tree Books, ISBN 978-0688070502
- The Fail-Safe Society: Community Defiance and the End of American Technological Optimism, 1993, University of California Press, ISBN 978-0520082021
- Doctored: Fraud, Arrogance, and Tragedy in the Quest to Cure Alzheimer’s, 2025, One Signal Publishers, ISBN 978-1668031247

== Awards and honors ==
Piller was recognized with the 2016 Online Kavli Science Journalism Gold Award from the American Association for the Advancement of Science for an investigation of clinical trials, together with Natalia Bronshtein, while at STAT. In 2014, the First Amendment Coalition honored him with the Free Speech & Open Government Award for his Sacramento Bee investigation of construction of the San Francisco–Oakland Bay Bridge that led to legislative changes in California to enhance "transparency and accountability". Evident Change (formerly the National Council on Crime & Delinquency) recognized Piller, along with Deborah Anderluh and Amy Pyle, for 2010 reporting at The Sacramento Bee on "CA Prisons: Behavior Modification Experiments and Suppression of Due Process". In 2008, the American Society of Tropical Medicine and Hygiene awarded him, along with Doug Smith, their Communications Award for reporting in the Los Angeles Times of "Unintended Victims of Gates Foundation Generosity".
