= C15H21N3O =

The molecular formula C_{15}H_{21}N_{3}O (molar mass: 259.35 g/mol, exact mass: 259.1685 u) may refer to:

- GSK-789,472
- Primaquine
- Simufilam
