= Lindsay Burns =

American rower (born 1965)

Personal information
- Born: 1965 Big Timber, Montana, U.S.
Medal record
Women's rowing
Representing United States
Olympic Games
Silver medal – second place	1996 Atlanta	Lwt double sculls
World Rowing Championships
Gold medal – first place	1987 Copenhagen	Lwt four
Silver medal – second place	1990 Tasmania	Lwt double sculls
Silver medal – second place	1991 Vienna	Lwt double sculls
Bronze medal – third place	1994 Indianapolis	Lwt double sculls

Lindsay H. Burns (born 1965) is an American neuroscientist and rower who won a silver medal at the 1996 Summer Olympics. She was a senior vice president of the pharmaceutical company Cassava Sciences until July 2024 and married to its CEO Remi Barbier.

As of July 2022, Cassava Sciences and papers co-authored by Burns were under investigation; co-author Hoau-Yan Wang was indicted for fraud in 2024 and Cassava denies any wrongdoing. Burns and Barbier (president and chief executive officer of Cassava) abruptly resigned in 2024 following Wang's indictment.

The U.S. Securities and Exchange Commission (SEC) filed charges in September 2024 against Cassava, Barbier, Burns and Wang with allegations including violations of "antifraud provisions of the federal securities laws" and "reporting provisions of the federal securities laws". The parties did not admit wrongdoing, but a settlement of the SEC charges, pending court approval, would fine Cassava $US40 million, Barbier $175,000, Burns $85,000 and Wang $50,000.

== Personal life ==
Burns was born in 1965 and raised in Big Timber, Montana. She graduated from Harvard University in 1987. In 1991, she obtained a PhD in neuroscience from University of Cambridge on a thesis titled Functional interactions of limbic afferents to the striatum and mesolimbic dopamine in reward-related processes, which was supervised by Barry Everitt and Trevor Robbins.

Burns worked as a research fellow in psychobiology at McLean Hospital in Belmont, Massachusetts. She joined Cassava Sciences in 2002 and became senior vice president of neuroscience in 2021.

Burns is married to Remi Barbier, the former CEO and founder of Cassava Sciences.

=== Rowing career ===
Burns started competitive rowing soon after entering Harvard. In 1987, she rowed in the Radcliffe varsity crew and won the Eastern Association of Women's Rowing Colleges (EAWRC) championship that awarded her the Ivy title and the EAWRC League title. She was part of the US rowing team from 1987 and from 1990 to 1996. Competing in the lightweight category at six World Rowing Championships, she won four medals: gold at the 1987; silvers in the double in 1990 and 1991; and bronze in the double in 1994. She won a silver medal at the 1995 Pan American Games competing in the quad sculls (heavyweight) category and she won the European Rowing Championships at Lucerne in 1995 with Teresa Bell. She was an alternate rower at the 1992 Summer Olympics in Barcelona, Spain.

She teamed up again with Teresa Bell at the 1996 Summer Olympics in Atlanta, United States, and won a silver medal in the Lightweight Double Sculls. In 2006, she was inducted into the Harvard Sports Hall of Fame. In 2016, she was inducted into the National Rowing Foundation Hall of Fame.

== Scientific works ==
Burns's first research was on the effect of neurokinin A on brain functions in rats. Her first paper in 1988, written with Ann E. Kelley, reported that neurokinin A in the ventral tegmental area modifies dopamine circuits to induce behavioral changes. She continued her PhD research on the role of dopamine and the limbic system. During her post-doc at McLean Hospital, she focused on neurodegenerative diseases, specifically, transplantation of pig neural cells into rat brain as a possible treatment of Parkinson's or Huntington's disease. Further research indicated possible use in humans. While working for a biotech company later acquired by Elan Pharmaceuticals, she published the effects of ziconotide in a rat model of spinal cord ischemia.

In 2005, she published a series of papers on Oxytrex and related research with ultra-low doses of certain (opioid antagonists) to enhance analgesia and prevent opioid-induced hyperalgesia, opioid tolerance and substance dependence.

Since 2006, Burns collaborated with Hoau-Yan Wang at the City University of New York, who had been investigating Alzheimer's disease. Burns and Wang wrote that FLNA was a critical protein in enabling Abeta42's signaling through the alpha 7 nicotinic acetylcholine receptor to induce Alzheimer's disease pathology (the publication has an expression of concern).

=== FLNA, simufilam and Alzheimer's disease ===
In 2008, Burns, Wang and Maya Frankfurt published in PLOS One a (later retracted) finding that the opioid antagonists naloxone and naltrexone bind with ultra-high affinity to FLNA to prevent mu opioid receptor excitatory signaling. Burns and Wang published (now retracted) the binding site on FLNA and the activation of CREB by opioid receptor – Gs coupling in the same journal the next year. FLNA is a cytoplasmic protein that maintains normal cell shape and division. In 2010, Burns and Wang announced a novel analgesic" which they named PTI-609 (PTI for Pain Therapeutics, Inc., the former name of Cassava Sciences) and stated that the molecule binds to FLNA as well as activating mu opioid receptors.

In 2012, they published in The Journal of Neuroscience (now with an expression of concern) a novel compound PTI-125 that binds to FLNA similarly to naloxone and naltrexone. With PTI-125, they stated that FLNA aberrantly links to the alpha 7 nicotinic receptor, enabling signaling of Abeta42 to hyperphosphorylate tau.

In 2017, they stated in Neurobiology of Aging (now with an expression of concern) that the FLNA in Alzheimer's disease transgenic mice and human postmortem brain tissue has an altered conformation (based on a shift in isoelectric focusing) and that PTI-125 binding to altered FLNA restores its normal shape, thereby reducing tau hyperphosphorylation, amyloid deposits and tau-containing lesions in the brains of the mice. The United States Adopted Names (USAN) gave the drug name for PTI-125 as simufilam in 2020; as of 2022, it is in Phase III clinical trials.

=== Research controversies ===
As of July 2022, Cassava Sciences and papers published by Burns and Wang were under investigation by the DOJ; Cassava denies any wrongdoing. The U.S. Securities and Exchange Commission (SEC), the U.S. National Institutes of Health (NIH), and City University of New York (CUNY) were also investigating allegations of manipulated data. According to The Wall Street Journal, the CUNY report stated that Burns shared with Wang some responsibility "for errors and misconduct". In June 2024, Wang was indicted by the United States Department of Justice (DOJ) for fraud and charged with falsifying data on $16 million in grant applications to the NIH related to the Alzheimer's drug in development, simufilam.

In September, the SEC charged Cassava, Barbier and Burns for "misleading statements ... made in September 2020 about the results of a phase two clinical trial for Cassava's purported drug treatment for Alzheimer's", and charged Wang for "manipulating the trial results". According to Reuters, the company "failed to disclose that a full set of patient data actually showed 'no measurable cognitive improvement in the patients' episodic memory'." The charges filed in the United States District Court for the Western District of Texas alleged that Cassava violated "antifraud provisions of the federal securities laws" and "reporting provisions of the federal securities laws" and the SEC stated in a press release that "without admitting or denying the allegations, Cassava, Barbier, and Burns ... agreed to pay civil penalties of $40 million, $175,000, and $85,000, respectively. Barbier and Burns agreed to be subject to officer-and-director bars of three and five years, respectively." The settlement must be approved by the U.S. District Court. According to Science journal's Piller, the SEC charged that Burns "'negligently failed to fully disclose' that she had removed data from 40% of the volunteers in a phase 2 simufilam clinical trial after learning which ones received simufilam or the placebo."
