= B. J. Kennedy =

American physician

Byrl James "B.J." Kennedy (1921–2003) was an American physician who is considered to be the "Father of Medical Oncology."

Born in Plainview, Minnesota, in 1921, B.J. Kennedy received his MD from the University of Minnesota Medical School. He served his residency at Massachusetts General Hospital and received further training at McGill University and Cornell Medical College.

Kennedy returned to the University of Minnesota Medical School in 1952, where remained for the rest of his career. He founded the division of oncology at the university in 1968 and led it for 22 years. His hard work, along with his colleagues, led to the creation of medical oncology as a subspecialty of internal medicine in 1972.

A leader throughout his career, Kennedy served as president of both the American Society of Clinical Oncology (1988) and American Association of Cancer Education (1982). He received the AMA Scientific Achievement Award in 1992.

He died on April 6, 2003, of multiple myeloma.
