= John E. Wagner =

American pediatric hematologist

John E. Wagner Jr.
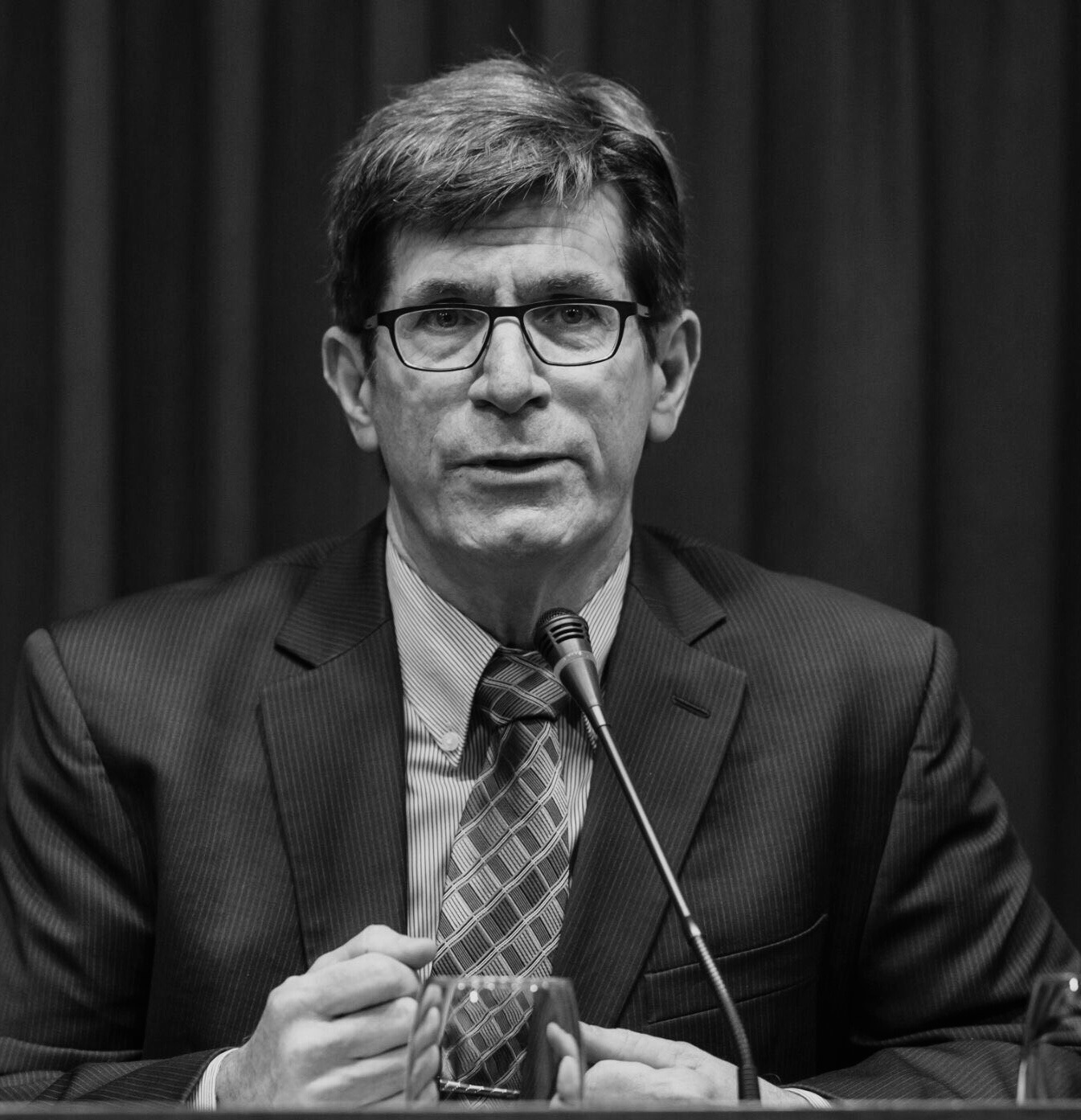
- Wagner Portrait
- Born: John Edward Wagner Jr.
- Education: Jefferson Medical College (M.D.); Duke University Medical Center (Pediatrics residency); Johns Hopkins University School of Medicine (Hematology/Oncology fellowship)
- Occupations: Pediatric hematologist-oncologist Hematopoietic stem cell transplant specialist
- Known for: Research on umbilical cord blood transplantation Development of double-unit cord blood grafts Allogeneic bone marrow transplantation for recessive dystrophic epidermolysis bullosa Cellular immunotherapy development
- Awards: Fanconi Cancer Foundation Lifetime Achievement Award (2025); Pediatric Blood and Marrow Transplant Consortium Lifetime Achievement Award (2017); Elected to Association of American Physicians (2006); Elected to American Society of Clinical Investigation (2000); Fanconi Anemia Pioneer Award for Therapeutic Advancements (2002); McKnight Presidential Chair in Cancer Research (2007-present); Children’s Cancer Research Fund/Hageboeck Family Endowed Chair in Pediatric Oncology (2005-present)

John E. Wagner Jr. is an American pediatric hematologist-oncologist and hematopoietic stem cell transplant specialist. He was the co-director of the Blood and Marrow Transplant & Cellular Therapy Program at the University of Minnesota Medical School between 2005 and 2019 stepping down to become director of the Institute of the Cell, Gene and Immunotherapeutics in 2019. He is also co-director of the Center for Translational Medicine, and co-leader of the Transplant and Cellular Therapy Program at the Masonic Cancer Center.

Wagner’s research has focused on expanding the use of umbilical cord blood as a source of hematopoietic stem cells and on developing cellular therapies to reduce complications of transplantation.

== Early life and education ==
Wagner received his M.D. from Jefferson Medical College. He completed residency training in pediatrics at Duke University Medical Center and a fellowship in pediatric hematology/oncology at Johns Hopkins University School of Medicine.

== Career ==
Wagner joined the University of Minnesota Medical School faculty in 1992. He established the Institute of Cell, Gene and Immunotherapeutics in 2019, where he serves as founding director.

== Research contributions ==
=== Umbilical cord blood transplantation ===
Wagner has contributed to research on umbilical cord blood as an alternative stem cell source. In 1990 he performed one of the first cord blood transplants for leukemia in a child. He then developed the first registry of sibling donor umbilical cord blood transplantation.

His group helped develop approaches to overcome cell-dose limitations in adults, including double-unit cord blood transplantation. A 2014 randomized trial he led through the Blood and Marrow Transplant Clinical Trials Network compared single- versus double-unit grafts and informed clinical guidelines.

His work is associated with the global use of cord blood transplantation in more than 50,000 patients.

=== Fanconi anemia and rare genetic disorders ===
Wagner’s group has studied safer transplantation strategies for patients with Fanconi anemia, including fludarabine-based reduced-intensity conditioning regimens that contributed to improved survival rates after alternative-donor transplantation. He has also been involved in early applications of preimplantation genetic diagnosis to create matched sibling donors.

=== The Molly Nash Case (Savior Sibling) ===
In 2000, Wagner led the team that performed the world's first successful hematopoietic stem cell transplantation using umbilical cord blood from a child conceived specifically as a savior sibling.

Molly Rose Nash (born 1994) had been diagnosed with Fanconi anemia, a rare, inherited bone-marrow failure disorder. Her parents, working with reproductive specialist Yury Verlinsky in Chicago, used in vitro fertilisation and preimplantation genetic diagnosis (PGD) to select an embryo that was both free of the Fanconi mutation and an HLA match for Molly. The resulting child, Adam Nash, was born on 29 August 2000.

Stem cells were harvested from Adam’s umbilical cord blood immediately after birth in a non-invasive procedure. In October 2000 the cells were transplanted into six-year-old Molly at the University of Minnesota under Wagner’s direction. Engraftment was successful; Molly’s bone marrow began producing healthy white blood cells and platelets within weeks.

The case was the first intentional use of PGD to create a stem-cell donor for a sibling and prompted widespread ethical debate about embryo selection and the welfare of “savior siblings.” As of 2018, both Molly and Adam Nash were reported to be healthy young adults.

=== Epidermolysis bullosa ===
In 2010 Wagner led the first-in-human study of allogeneic bone marrow transplantation for recessive dystrophic epidermolysis bullosa, demonstrating improvement in skin manifestations in some patients.

=== Cellular immunotherapy ===
Wagner has served as principal investigator of an National Cancer Institute Program Project Grant (CA065493) for more than 25 years focused on the development of engineered off-the-shelf allogeneic immune effector cell therapies to reduce graft failure, prevent graft-versus-host disease and prolonged immune deficiency, and relapse after transplantation.

== Honors and awards ==
- Fanconi Cancer Foundation Lifetime Achievement Award (2025)
- Pediatric Blood and Marrow Transplant Consortium Lifetime Achievement Award (2017)
- Elected member, Association of American Physicians (2006)
- Elected member, American Society of Clinical Investigation (2000)
- Fanconi Anemia Pioneer Award for Therapeutic Advancements (2002)
- McKnight Presidential Chair in Cancer Research, University of Minnesota (2007–present)
- Children’s Cancer Research Fund/Hageboeck Family Endowed Chair in Pediatric Oncology (2005–present)

== Selected publications ==
- Wagner, John E. Jr.; Eapen, Mary; Carter, Shelley (2014-10-30). "One-unit versus two-unit cord-blood transplantation for hematologic cancers". New England Journal of Medicine. 371 (18): 1685–1694. doi:10.1056/NEJMoa1405584. PMC 4257059. PMID 25354103.
- Wagner, John E.; Barker, Juliet N.; DeFor, Todd E. (2002-09-01). "Transplantation of unrelated donor umbilical cord blood in 102 patients with malignant and non-malignant diseases: influence of CD34 cell dose and HLA disparity on treatment-related mortality and survival". Blood. 100 (5): 1611–1618. PMID 12176879.
- MacMillan, Margaret L.; DeFor, Todd E.; Young, Jo-Anne (2015-06-11). "Alternative donor hematopoietic cell transplantation for Fanconi anemia". Blood. 125 (24): 3798–3804. doi:10.1182/blood-2015-02-626002. PMC 4463740. PMID 25824691.
- Grewal, Satkiran S.; MacMillan, Margaret L.; Kahn, Jeffrey P.; Ramsay, Norma K.C.; Wagner, John E. (2004-02-15). "Successful hematopoietic stem cell transplantation for Fanconi anemia from an unaffected HLA-genotype-identical sibling selected using preimplantation genetic diagnosis". Blood. 103 (4): 1147–1151. doi:10.1182/blood-2003-02-0587. PMID 14504102.
- Wolf, Susan M.; Kahn, Jeffrey P.; Wagner, John E. (2003). "Using preimplantation genetic diagnosis to create a stem cell donor: issues, guidelines & limits". Journal of Law, Medicine & Ethics. 31 (3): 327–339. doi:10.1111/j.1748-720X.2003.tb00097.x. PMID 14626542.
- Wagner, John E.; Ishida-Yamamoto, Akemi; McGrath, John A. (2010-08-12). "Bone marrow transplantation for recessive dystrophic epidermolysis bullosa". New England Journal of Medicine. 363 (7): 629–639. doi:10.1056/NEJMoa0910501. PMC 2967187. PMID 20558621.
