= Carol R. Bradford =

American otolaryngologist

Academic background
- Education: MA, microbiology/immunology, MD, University of Michigan

Carol R. Bradford is an American otolaryngologist. She was the 15th dean of the Ohio State University College of Medicine and vice president for Health Sciences at the Ohio State University Wexner Medical Center. She currently serves as the interim dean of the University of Minnesota Medical School and executive vice president for Health Affairs.

== Early life and education ==
Bradford earned her master’s degree in microbiology/immunology and her medical degree at the University of Michigan. Following this, she completed her internship in general surgery at Saint Joseph Mercy Health System and her research fellowship and otolaryngology residency at the University of Michigan.

== Career ==
Following her residency and fellowship, Bradford joined the faculty at her alma mater, the University of Michigan, in 1992 as an assistant professor of otolaryngology. She was soon promoted to the rank of full professor in 2004 and chair of the Department of Otolaryngology. During this time, she was also recognized with the 2009 the Castle Connolly National Physician of the Year Award for "clinical excellence in medicine." In 2014, Bradford was elected a member of the National Academy of Medicine (then referred to as the Institute of Medicine) for her research into the treatment of head and neck cancer. Two years later, Bradford was appointed the executive vice dean for academic affairs at the University of Michigan Medical School.

After remaining at the University of Michigan for 28 years, Bradford became the 15th dean of the Ohio State University College of Medicine and vice president for Health Sciences at the Ohio State University Wexner Medical Center. At the same time, she was also elected President of the American Academy of Otolaryngology–Head and Neck Surgery for a one-year term.
