= Paul P. Boswell =

American politician and physician (1905–1982)

Member of the Illinois House of Representatives
- In office 1965–1966

Personal details
- Born: June 12, 1905 Pittsburgh, Pennsylvania, U.S.
- Died: March 3, 1982 (aged 76) Chicago, Illinois, U.S.
- Party: Republican
- Education: Lincoln University; University of Minnesota Medical School

Paul P. Boswell (June 12, 1905 – March 3, 1982) was an American politician and medical doctor.

== Life and career ==
Boswell was born in Pittsburgh, Pennsylvania. He went to Central High School in Minneapolis, Minnesota. Boswell was an African-American. He graduated from Lincoln University in 1929 and University of Minnesota Medical School in 1940, the first African American to graduate from the school. In 1942 he was awarded a fellowship from the Rosenwald Fund which paid for further advanced training at the University of Illinois College of Medicine. He specialized in dermatology.

Boswell practiced medicine in Chicago, Illinois at Michael Reese Hospital for more than thirty years and was also an attending physician at Provident Hospital. Boswell served in the Illinois House of Representatives in 1965 and 1966 as a Republican. Boswell died at Michael Reese Hospital and Medical Center in Chicago, Illinois.

Boswell was married to Arnita Young, the sister of civil rights activist Whitney Young.
