= Vernon L. Sommerdorf =

American politician (1921–2009)

Vernon L. Sommerdorf (April 9, 1921 – October 19, 2009) was an American physician and politician.

Sommerdorf was born in Brownton, McLeod County, Minnesota. He graduated from the University of Minnesota Medical School and served in the United States Navy during World War II. Sommerdorf lived with his wife and family in Saint Paul, Minnesota and he practiced medicine in Saint Paul. Sommerdorf served in the Minnesota House of Representatives from 1965 to 1972. He died in Saint Paul, Minnesota.
