= Hoau-Yan Wang =

Taiwanese American medical researcher

Hoau-Yan Wang was a medical professor at CUNY School of Medicine until his 2025 retirement. In 2024, he was indicted by a federal grand jury for defrauding the National Institutes of Health of approximately $16 million in research grants. The United States Department of Justice (DOJ) dropped the charges "with prejudice" but without giving a reason shortly before the October 2025 trial was slated to begin, and after CUNY announced in May that their investigation found research misconduct could not be proven.

== Early life and education ==
Wang was born in Taiwan. After earning a bachelor's degree from China Medical College, he moved to the United States in the early 1980s to pursue a master's degree at St. John's University in New York City, which he followed with a doctoral degree from the Medical College of Pennsylvania.

== Career ==
Wang took a teaching position at the CUNY School of Medicine in the mid-2000s where much of his research focused on the effect of recreational drug on dopaminergic neurons. He was approached by Cassava Sciences (then known as Pain Therapeutics) to consult on the development of an addiction-resistant painkiller that would act on the scaffolding protein, filamin A. Through this work, he began a years-long collaboration with Cassava researcher Lindsay Burns. When the new drug failed to show promise as a pain medication, Cassava began investigating the compound as an Alzheimer's disease treatment. The drug was granted the name simufilam in 2020.

In August 2021, neuroscientists and Cassava short-sellers petitioned the Food and Drug Administration to cease clinical trials of simufilam, citing suspicion of image manipulation in the supporting research. When these concerns were communicated through the Office of Research Integrity, CUNY launched an investigation into Wang's research, concluding in 2023 that 14 out of the 31 allegations of misconduct were credible. On June 28, 2024, a federal grand jury in the District of Maryland indicted Wang for fraud connected to simufilam research. According to the DOJ, he had allegedly manipulated data in publications supporting the drug between 2015 and 2023.

For a trial slated to begin in October 2025, CUNY released a report claiming scientific misconduct by Wang could not be proven. The United States Department of Justice dropped the charges shortly before trial was scheduled to begin, without giving a reason.

As of October 2025, Wang was retired from CUNY.
