= Keith Yamamoto =

American biochemist

Keith R. Yamamoto
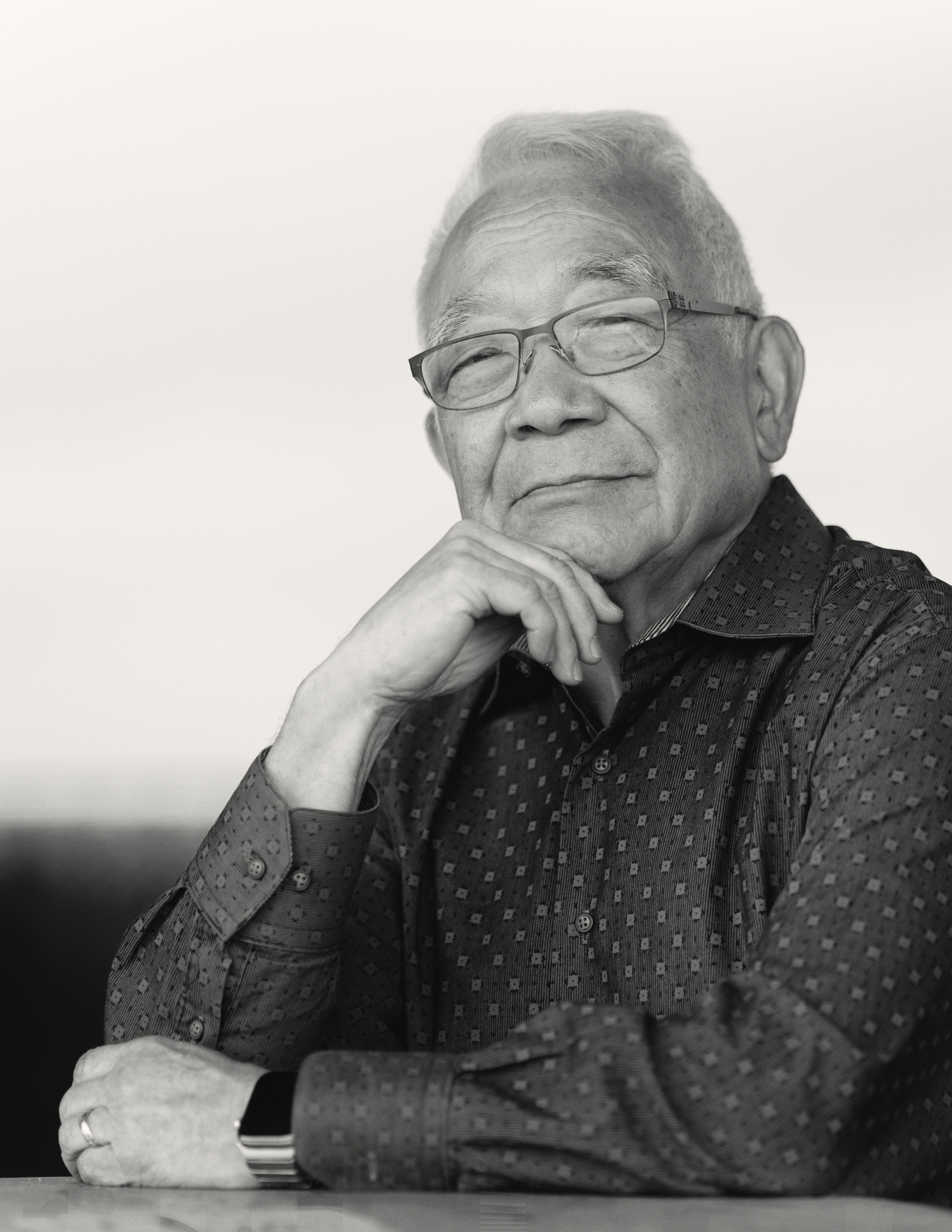
- Born: February 4, 1946 (age 80); Des Moines, Iowa, United States
- Education: Iowa State University, Princeton University
- Scientific career
- Fields: Biochemistry
- Workplaces: University of California, San Francisco

Keith R. Yamamoto (born February 4, 1946) is vice chancellor of science policy and strategy and professor of cellular and molecular pharmacology at the University of California, San Francisco, (UCSF). He also holds the position of director of UCSF Precision Medicine. He is known for his molecular biology and biochemistry research on nuclear receptors and his involvement in science policy and precision medicine.

Yamamoto identified the genomic sequences to which the glucocorticoid receptor (GR) binds in order to control gene transcription termed "glucocorticoid response elements". In science policy, he has served as chairman of the board on Life Sciences at the National Academy of Sciences, as well as serving on numerous government and public advisory boards, including the NIH Center for Scientific Review Advisory Council.

== Research career ==
Yamamoto was born in Des Moines, Iowa, and graduated from Iowa State University with a B.S. in biochemistry and biophysics in 1968. At Iowa State, he was a member of the Delta Upsilon fraternity. He earned his doctorate in biochemical sciences at Princeton University in 1973 in the laboratory of Bruce Alberts for his research on the estrogen receptor (ER). He then began his research on the glucocorticoid receptor as a postdoctoral fellow with Gordon Tomkins at UCSF.

In 1976, Yamamoto joined the Department of Biochemistry and Biophysics at the University of California, San Francisco (UCSF) as an assistant professor. In 1978, he became an associate professor and in 1983 a full professor. He also took on the role of vice-chair of the Department of Biochemistry and Biophysics at UCSF in 1985. In 2015, Yamamoto became UCSF's first vice chancellor of science policy and strategy. He was previously the vice chancellor of research for the university, and the vice dean, research, within the School of Medicine.

Yamamoto was elected a fellow of the American Academy of Arts and Sciences in 1989, elected to the National Academy of Sciences in 1989, and to the American Association for the Advancement of Science in 2002. Yamamoto ran a research lab focused on understanding signaling and transcriptional control by nuclear receptors and continues to teach graduate courses in molecular biology and biochemistry at UCSF.

== Political career ==
Throughout his career, Yamamoto has also been committed to public and science policy. In the 1980s he argued against the development of biological warfare by the U.S. Department of Defense. In 1986 he co-authored with Charles Piller a book, "The Rebirth of American Biological Warfare:GENE WARS Military Control Over the New Genetic Technologies", disclosing the history of the use of biological weapons in the United States and advising against continuing these programs.

Yamamoto has served on several committees that oversee the NIH peer-review process which allocates funding to research investigators. He was chairman of the NIH Center for Scientific Review Advisory Committee from 1996 to 2000. From 2007 to 2008 he co-chaired the advisory committee to the Director Working Group on Peer Review and the advisory committee to the NIH Director from 2007-2010. He had advocated for streamlining the science grant review process and for devising strategies for focusing NIH funding on research that will have the greatest impact in the field. In 2008, he was nominated as one of 10 Influential People to Watch in Biomedical Policy.

In April 2022, Yamamoto was elected as president of the American Association of the Advancement of Science (AAAS), the largest multidisciplinary scientific society in the world.

== Publications ==
Research publications at Pubmed
