= Michela Gallagher =

Cognitive psychologist

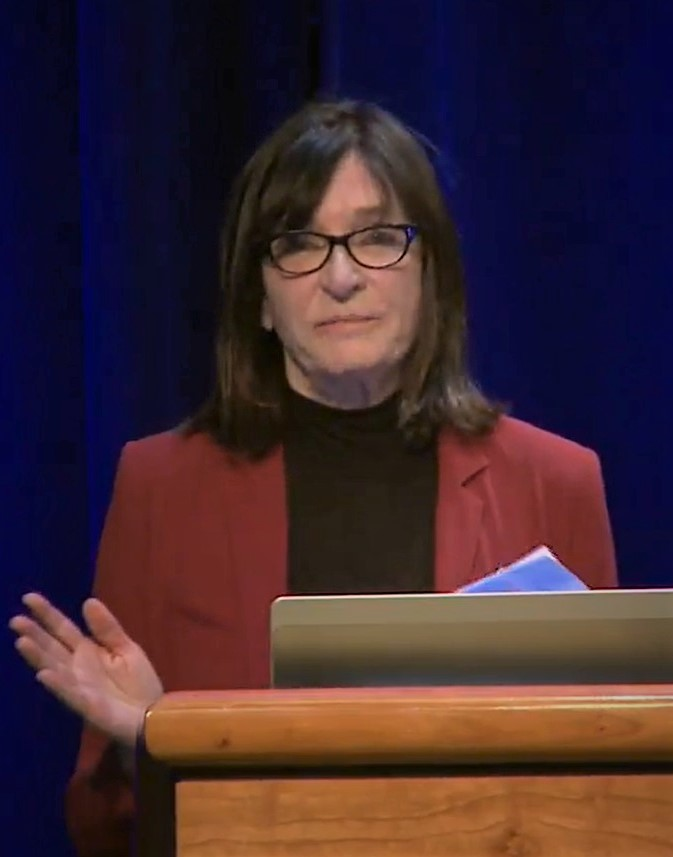
- Gallagher speaks to the National Institute on Aging in 2017
- Education: University College London, Colgate University, University of Vermont
- Awards: Mika Salpeter Lifetime Achievement Award
- Scientific career
- Workplaces: University of North Carolina–Chapel Hill, Johns Hopkins University, AgeneBio
- Thesis: The effects of norepinephrine manipulations in the amygdala on time-dependent memory processes (1977)

Michela Gallagher is an American cognitive psychologist and neuroscientist. She is the Krieger-Eisenhower Professor of Psychology and Neuroscience at Johns Hopkins University. Her scientific work has changed the model of neurocognitive aging, and developed new indices for its study. Previously, work had focused on neurodegeneration as a primary cause of memory loss.

Gallagher's research suggests that age-related declines in cognition may also occur in the absence of neurodegeneration, due to malfunctioning rather than dying off. Gallagher is also the founder and CEO of AgeneBio, a company which aims to develop a cure for Alzheimer's disease.

== Education and career ==
Gallagher did her first degree at University College London, where she majored in fine art. She transferred to Colgate University in New York in her last year. She graduated from Colgate University in 1969, in its first class to include women. She was among the first two women at Colgate to receive a Bachelor of Arts degree, and she was the first woman to go on to receive her doctorate.

Her interest in the visual arts sparked her interest in the visual system and neuroscience, and she also became interested in memory. Gallagher went on to the University of Vermont, graduating with a PhD in neuroscience in 1977. Her thesis was titled The effects of norepinephrine manipulations in the amygdala on time-dependent memory processes.

Gallagher then worked at the University of North Carolina–Chapel Hill, where she was the Kenan Professor of Psychology. She joined Johns Hopkins University in 1997. She became the chair of the Department of Psychological and Brain Science at Johns Hopkins in 2000, holding the position until 2007. She became the Krieger-Eisenhower Professor of Psychology and Neuroscience in 2003. She became Vice Provost of Academic Affairs in 2008, holding the appointment for four years. She also leads the Neurogenetics and Behavior Center, located at Johns Hopkins University.

Gallagher was the editor-in-chief of Behavioral Neuroscience from 1995 to 2001. She is a member of the American Association for the Advancement of Science (AAAS), and a fellow of the American Psychological Association (APA), the Association for Psychological Science, and the Society for Neuroscience (SfN) among others. She founded AgeneBio in 2008, which focuses on finding new treatments for Alzheimer's disease.

== Research ==
Gallagher studies age-related changes in the brain. Her scientific work has changed the model of neurocognitive aging. Beginning in the 1950s, work had focused on neurodegeneration as a primary cause of memory loss. Gallagher's research suggests that brain cells are malfunctioning rather than just dying off. This has led researchers to investigate a wide range of neural mechanisms and different possible interventions.

"This is terrific, because if neurodegeneration is not a primary cause of the impairment that we see in the elderly, and if we don't have to find ways to replace missing nerve cells [through] nerve cell transplants and so forth, then the challenge of maximizing the potential of the elderly suddenly becomes much more tractable". – Michela Gallagher, 2001

Over a number of years, Gallagher has developed a model for the controlled study of natural aging and age-related memory loss, using Long-Evans rats. The rats are bred to age well, and Gallagher studies them over their entire lifetime. During that time, they are carefully looked after, and protected from exposure to germs and viruses. Measures of the rats' memory and cognition abilities have been developed for use in water mazes.

With Rebecca Burwell and Margaret Burchinal (1993), Gallagher developed new measures of spatial learning for use with the Morris water navigation task (often referred to as the Morris water maze). These included "the cumulative search error during learning trials, the average proximity during probe trials, and the spatial learning index to quantify overall learning of the task across days." The impact of these measures in the field is significant. Researchers reference measures such as "Gallagher’s proximity-index" and the "Gallagher-Baker indices".

One of Gallagher's fields of study is hyperactivity in the hippocampus, which occurs in patients with Alzheimer's disease, and may cause amnestic mild cognitive impairment. She found that aging rats with hyperactivity in the hippocampus caused difficulties in completing a memory task. Giving these rats levetiracetam reduced these impairments.

Gallagher started the company AgeneBio, which studies treatments for mild cognitive impairment in patients with Alzheimer's disease. One of the therapeutics the company researches is AGB-101, a form of levetiracetam, which targets neuronal hyperactivity in the hippocampus. This drug was developed for use in epilepsy. For this work Gallagher received the Melvin R. Goodes Prize for Excellence in Alzheimer's Drug Discovery from the Alzheimer's Drug Discovery Foundation. In addition, the company is studying a drug called GABA-A a5 PAM, which also targets hyperactivity in the hippocampus. In 2019 the company received a $3.4m grant for this work.

== Honors ==
- 2008: International Behavioral Neuroscience Society Career Achievement Award
- 2010: D.O. Hebb Distinguished Scientific Contribution Award, American Psychological Association
- 2014: Mika Salpeter Lifetime Achievement Award
- 2017: Pavlovian Society Gantt Medal
- 2018: Melvin R. Goodes Prize for Excellence in Alzheimer's Drug Discovery
- 2019: Honorary degree from the University of Vermont
- 2019: Estelle Gelman Award for Innovation in Drug Discovery

== Selected publications ==
- Gallagher, Michela; Burwell, Rebecca; Burchinal, Margaret (2015). "Severity of spatial learning impairment in aging: Development of a learning index for performance in the Morris water maze". Behavioral Neuroscience. 129 (4): 540–548. doi:10.1037/bne0000080. ISSN 1939-0084. PMC 5640430. PMID 26214219.
- Bakker, Arnold; Krauss, Gregory L.; Albert, Marilyn S.; Speck, Caroline L.; Jones, Lauren R.; Stark, Craig E.; Yassa, Michael A.; Bassett, Susan S.; Shelton, Amy L.; Gallagher, Michela (2012). "Reduction of hippocampal hyperactivity improves cognition in amnestic mild cognitive impairment". Neuron. 74 (3): 467–474. doi:10.1016/j.neuron.2012.03.023. ISSN 1097-4199. PMC 3351697. PMID 22578498.
- Koh, Ming Teng; Haberman, Rebecca P; Foti, Stacey; McCown, Thomas J; Gallagher, Michela (23 December 2009). "Treatment Strategies Targeting Excess Hippocampal Activity Benefit Aged Rats with Cognitive Impairment". Neuropsychopharmacology. 35 (4): 1016–1025. doi:10.1038/npp.2009.207. PMC 5972837. PMID 20032967.
- Gallagher, M.; McMahan, R. W.; Schoenbaum, G. (1999). "Orbitofrontal cortex and representation of incentive value in associative learning". The Journal of Neuroscience. 19 (15): 6610–6614. doi:10.1523/JNEUROSCI.19-15-06610.1999. ISSN 0270-6474. PMC 6782791. PMID 10414988.
- Schoenbaum, Geoffrey; Chiba, Andrea A.; Gallagher, Michela (1998). "Orbitofrontal cortex and basolateral amygdala encode expected outcomes during learning". Nature Neuroscience. 1 (2): 155–159. doi:10.1038/407. ISSN 1546-1726. PMID 10195132. S2CID 32102624.
- Rapp, P R; Gallagher, M (1996). "Preserved neuron number in the hippocampus of aged rats with spatial learning deficits". Proceedings of the National Academy of Sciences of the United States of America. 93 (18): 9926–9930. Bibcode:1996PNAS...93.9926R. doi:10.1073/pnas.93.18.9926. ISSN 0027-8424. PMC 38531. PMID 8790433.
