= University of Minnesota Medical School =

Public medical school in Minnesota, US

Coordinates: 44°58′20″N 93°13′58″W

- Type: Public
- Established: 1888
- Dean: Carol R. Bradford (interim)
- Faculty: 2,089
- Location: Minneapolis & Duluth, Minnesota, United States
- Campus: Urban
- Website: www.med.umn.edu

The University of Minnesota Medical School is a medical school at the University of Minnesota. It is a combination of three campuses located in Minneapolis, Duluth, and St. Cloud, Minnesota.

The medical school has more than 17,000 alumni as of 2022. As of 2017, 70% of the state's physicians had taken classes there.

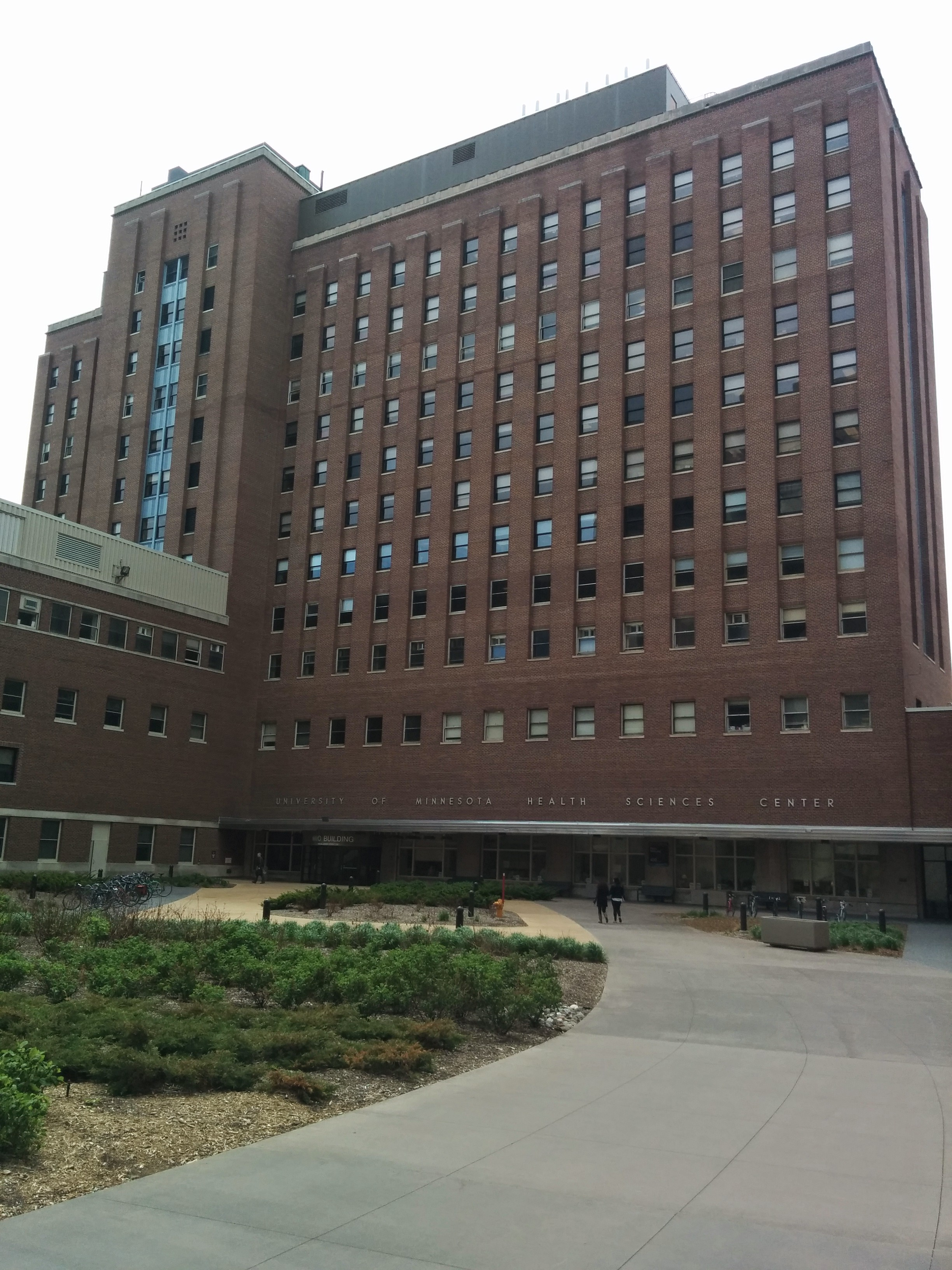
The Mayo Building, home of the University of Minnesota Medical School, on the university's East Bank campus

== History ==
The University of Minnesota Medical School began in 1888 when three of the private medical schools in the Twin Cities in Minnesota merged their programs to form the University of Minnesota Medical School. A fourth school was integrated in 1908. As a consequence of these mergers, the school is one of two in the state, the other being the Mayo Clinic Alix School of Medicine in Rochester, Minnesota. The University of Minnesota Medical School's older buildings include the Mayo Memorial Building (1954) and Jackson Hall (1912). Jackson Hall was built as the home of the Institute of Anatomy and is still the site of anatomy instruction for students.

=== Surgical operations ===
At the hospital, John Lewis, Walton Lillehei, Richard Varco, and others performed open-heart surgery in 1952. The first portable cardiac pacemaker was created by Earl Bakken with the help of Walton Lillehei and Richard Varco in 1957. The first pancreas-kidney transplant by Richard Lillehei and William Kelly and another first intestinal transplant by Richard Lillehei were performed in 1966. The field of Medical Oncology was pioneered by B.J. Kennedy later in 1972. The first total pancreatectomy and islet auto-transplant (T-PIAT) was performed in 1977.

At the hospital, a bone marrow and cord blood transplant was performed by John Wagner and Jakub Tolar in 2007, and a cord blood transplant aimed at curing leukemia and HIV/AIDS was performed in 2013. In 2014, with the support of Governor Mark Dayton and the Minnesota legislature, the University of Minnesota Medical School created Medical Discovery Teams (MDT) to promote the medical school.

== Academics ==
The University of Minnesota Medical School is part of the Academic Health Centers (AHC) in the United States. The AHC comprises the Medical School, School of Dentistry, School of Nursing, College of Pharmacy, School of Public Health, and the College of Veterinary Medicine.

The University of Minnesota Medical School offers seven dual-degree programs for a degree in medical research (MD/PhD), public health (MD/MPH), biomedical engineering (MD/MS), law (MD/JD), business (MD/MBA), or health informatics (MD/MHI). The Medical School also offers 10 pathways for students to experience longitudinal integrated clerkships at hosting sites, each with a different focus. A longitudinal integrated clerkship was implemented at the University of Minnesota Medical School in 1971. Jack Verby created the Rural Physicians Associate Program (RPAP) as a workforce initiative for rural Minnesota.

The larger of the two campuses is in the Twin Cities. The Duluth campus, formerly the University of Minnesota Duluth School of Medicine, has approximately 65 students enrolled for each of the first two years of medical school as of 2022, after which they transfer to the Twin Cities campus for their clinical rotations. Duluth is also a primary site for the Center for American Indian and Minority Health.

== Research ==
Research conducted by Sylvain Lesné in the area of Alzheimer's disease was investigated after a Science magazine article reported some allegations that the images in the paper were manipulated in a 2006 Nature publication, co-authored by Lesné, Karen Ashe, and others. Karen Ashe has stated that the paper contains doctored images. The study has been retracted on June 24, and Lesné resigned from UMN effective March 1, 2025.

== Partnerships ==
The University of Minnesota Medical School has partnered with Fairview Health Services in 1997, making the university hospital under Fairview operations and eventually moving pediatrics to the West Bank, and with its group practice, University of Minnesota Physicians, also known as M Physicians, is the multispecialty group practice composed of faculty from the University of Minnesota Medical School.

A partnership between the University of Minnesota Physicians and Fairview Health Services was formalized through a 2019 agreement. The partnership included 11 hospitals and 56 primary care clinics, which were managed by Fairview.

== Rankings ==
The University of Minnesota Medical School was ranked 21st in the country in the 2022 Blue Ridge Rankings, based on annual NIH funding of $341 million. In its 2023 report, U.S. News & World Report ranked the University of Minnesota Medical School 2nd in the nation for primary care, 35th in the United States for medical research, and 7th for family medicine.

== Notable alumni and faculty ==
=== Department of Surgery ===
- C. Walton Lillehei
- Russell M. Nelson, later president of the Church of Jesus Christ of Latter-day Saints
- Norman Shumway
- Owen Harding Wangensteen

=== Department of Medicine ===
- Kathleen Annette
- Paul P. Boswell
- Harriet Beecher Conant
- Mary A. G. Dight
- Robert A. Good
- B. J. Kennedy
- Maureen Reed
- Vernon L. Sommerdorf

=== Department of Interventional Radiology ===
- Kurt Amplatz

=== Department of Pediatrics ===
- Damien Fair

=== Department of Urology ===
- Donald Gleason
