= Labaton Keller Sucharow =

American law firm

Labaton Keller Sucharow LLP
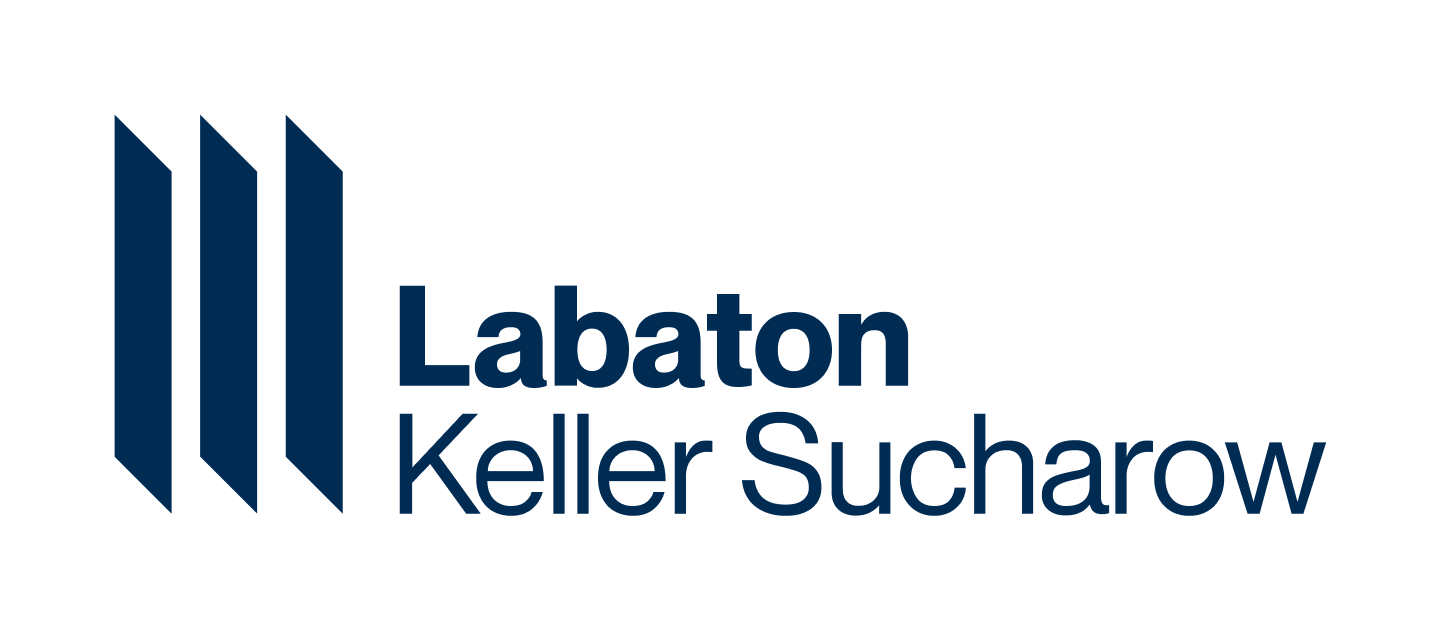
- Headquarters: 140 Broadway; New York, NY
- No. of offices: 4
- No. of attorneys: 75
- Major practice areas: Class action lawsuits, securities
- Date founded: 1963
- Founder: Lawrence Sucharow, Edward Labaton
- Company type: Limited liability partnership
- Website: labaton.com

Labaton Keller Sucharow LLP (Note: The firm is pronounced LAB-ah-tawn KEH-lər soo-SHAR-oh.) is an American plaintiffs' law firm. Founded in 1963, the firm employs 75 lawyers in offices in New York, Delaware, Washington, D.C., and London.

== History and notable cases ==
Labaton Sucharow was founded in 1963 by Edward Labaton and Lawrence Sucharow. In 2010, the firm expanded to Delaware. Christopher J. Keller has led the firm as chairman since 2020.

The firm has been a donor to state attorneys general associations, candidates, state party committees, and attorneys general running for governor.

Labaton Sucharow represented several state pension funds in a class action lawsuit against the investment management firm State Street Global Advisors. In 2016, the firm won a $300 million settlement against State Street. That year, The Boston Globe investigated allegations that Labaton Sucharow had inflated hourly bills and that its lawyers donated money to state pension fund officials, resulting in a $4.8 million settlement following a report from retired federal judge Gerald Ellis Rosen. Appointed to investigate the allegations, his report accused multiple law firms, including Labaton, of inflating billable hours and showing "a troubling disdain for candor and transparency that at times crossed the line to outright concealment of facts.'" The New York Times wrote that the firm's "settlement could prompt greater transparency about so-called finder fees paid to lawyers—especially those who do little actual work in a matter" and that the firm's settlement agreement brought attention to "the kinds of behind-the-scenes deals that plaintiffs' law firms reach with other lawyers to build their case."

In 2020, the firm secured a $192 million settlement from SCANA Corp., "resolving class claims the company and its executives misled the public about long delays and massive cost overruns in a $9 billion nuclear reactor project."

In 2020, U.S. District Judge Mark L. Wolf reduced Labaton Sucharow's fee in the State Street case by $10 million after finding the firm failed to disclose an agreement to pay a Texas lawyer who introduced the firm to the pension fund that served as the case's lead plaintiff.

In 2021, French businessman Gerard Sillam and French lawyer Aldric Saulnier claimed that the firm had defrauded them out of fees for introducing Labaton partners to billion-dollar European money-management firms that Labaton sought to represent. In 2022, U.S. District Judge Colleen McMahon ruled that Sillam and Saulnier could bring a claim against the law firm following its motion to dismiss.

In 2021, the firm achieved a $650 million settlement for Illinois Facebook users as co-lead counsel in In re Facebook Biometric Information Privacy Litigation. The case asserted claims that the company violated Illinois's Biometric Information Privacy Act (BIPA) by using facial recognition technology without consent. The firm also represents Illinois Samsung Galaxy owners over allegations that the devices violate BIPA. In 2023, a Chicago federal judge ruled that Samsung must comply with its own terms of service and pay more than $4 million in filing fees to begin a mass arbitration.

In 2022, the firm acted as co-lead counsel in a breach of fiduciary duty case against Dell Technologies founder Michael Dell and other defendants. The $1 billion settlement was reportedly one of the largest cash settlements in Delaware Chancery Court history on behalf of shareholders.

In 2023, the firm reached agreements with Allstate Corp. to settle allegations that the auto insurer failed to disclose details about a spike in claims for $90 million and with Alexion for a $125 million settlement to end claims that the drugmaker caused a double-digit plunge in stock price after allegedly illegal and unethical sales strategies came to light.

In January 2024, the firm added its Chairman Christopher Keller to its name, becoming Labaton Keller Sucharow.
