= Simufilam =

Experimental drug

Clinical data
- Other names: PTI-125, PTI-910
- ATC code: None

Pharmacokinetic data
- Elimination half-life: 4.5 hours

Identifiers
- IUPAC name: 1-benzyl-8-methyl-1,4,8-triazaspiro(4.5)decan-2-one
- CAS Number: 1224591-33-6
- PubChem CID: 46195331
- UNII: 6NV440YIO0
- KEGG: D12003
- ChEMBL: ChEMBL4650230

Chemical and physical data
- Formula: C_{15}H_{21}N_{3}O
- Molar mass: 259.353 g·mol^{−1}
- 3D model (JSmol): Interactive image
- SMILES: CN1CCC2(CC1)NCC(=O)N2Cc1ccccc1
- InChI: InChI=1S/C15H21N3O/c1-17-9-7-15(8-10-17)16-11-14(19)18(15)12-13-5-3-2-4-6-13/h2-6,16H,7-12H2,1H3; Key:BSQPTZYKCAULBH-UHFFFAOYSA-N

Simufilam (PTI-125) is an experimental medication for the treatment of Alzheimer's disease that was being developed by the American pharmaceutical firm Cassava Sciences. Its development was discontinued in November 2024 after it failed to show clinical benefit during phase III clinical trials.

== History ==
From research funded by Cassava Sciences (then Pain Therapeutics), Lindsay Burns (Cassava's senior vice president of neuroscience), Hoau-Yan Wang (a CUNY professor and Cassava advisor), and Maya Frankfurt (CUNY) reported in PLOS One the binding of a 300-kDa protein called filamin A (FLNA) with naloxone to prevent opioid tolerance and drug dependence. The authors claimed this was a critical discovery of the binding of certain opioid antagonists (naloxone and naltrexone) to FLNA, a cytoskeletal protein that is critical in maintaining cell shape and division. Burns and Wang reported the pentapeptide binding site on FLNA the next year. Both of these papers were retracted by PLOS One in 2022.

Wang separately identified a large protein associating with the alpha 7 nicotinic receptor when Abeta42 bound and signaled through this receptor in Alzheimer's disease models. He identified it as FLNA, and Wang and Burns tested the hypothesis that it was critical to the toxic signaling of soluble amyloid. In 2012, they stated in The Journal of Neuroscience that the compound PTI-125 disrupted FLNA linkage with the alpha 7 nicotinic receptor as well as the toxic signaling of Abeta42, presenting PTI-125 as a novel therapeutic strategy for Alzheimer's disease. The Journal of Neuroscience issued an expression of concern in 2022.

Wang, Burns and co-authors reported in Neurobiology of Aging in 2017 that PTI-125 induced improvements in Alzheimer's disease pathology as it binds, and restores to normal, an altered conformation of FLNA in a transgenic mouse model of Alzheimer's disease. Neurobiology of Aging issued an expression of concern for this paper in 2022.

In 2018, the National Institutes of Health granted the company a research award for early clinical trials of PTI-125 as an Alzheimer's drug. In August 2020, the United States Adopted Names (USAN) assigned the drug chemical name as simufilam.

Open-label studies started in March 2020, and Cassava Sciences reported in May 2020 that initial biomarker analysis of cerebrospinal fluid (CSF) samples from its phase IIb clinical trials of PTI-125 had failed, but reported in September 2020 that a new analysis by an "outside lab" showed improvements in biomarkers, adding that individuals with Alzheimer's also showed improvements in cognition with simufilam. It was later revealed that the outside lab was Wang's CUNY lab.

In October 2021, larger trials were initiated; Cassava Sciences announced in December 2021 that the first phase III trial of simufilam would enroll about 750 participants, and the second 1,000. In the first quarter of 2022, 60 participants were enrolled; Stat stated that enrollment had slowed as of April 2022, as people were deterred from enlisting due to the prevailing controversies. In August 2022, Cassava stated that over 400 patients had enrolled in the trials.

On 25 November 2024, development of simufilam was discontinued after it failed to show clinical benefit during its phase III clinical trials.

== Pharmacology ==
The publishing journals have issued expressions of concern for studies related to the pharmacology.

Burns and Wang reported in 2008 that FLNA contains the high-affinity binding site of naloxone and naltrexone in preventing opioid tolerance and dependence, and in 2020 that by disrupting that simufilam reduces the ultra-tight binding of amyloid beta 42 to the alpha-7 nicotinic receptor. Burns and Wang say that the FLNA linkage to the alpha-7 nicotinic receptor is critical to amyloid's toxic signaling through this receptor and that simufilam disrupts FLNA's linkage to this receptor to stop this toxic signaling. They later demonstrated, by isoelectric focusing, that simufilam restores to normal an altered conformation of FLNA in Alzheimer's disease models or postmortem human brain tissue.

A 2020 study found simufilam improved epilepsy in a mouse model where FLNA was overexpressed.

== Allegations of research irregularities ==
The US Food and Drug Administration (FDA) received a citizen petition in August 2021 to stop the clinical trials and investigate Cassava Sciences. Scientists questioned the preclinical results, citing the small sample size, alleged methodological flaws in an in vitro technique, alleged manipulations of western blot images and potential conflict of interest.

After the FDA said that the citizen petition was the improper procedure to request an investigation, Reuters reported in July 2022 that a criminal investigation of Cassava Sciences was started by the United States Department of Justice (DOJ) over research results related to the experimental drug. The U.S. Securities and Exchange Commission (SEC), the U.S. National Institutes of Health (NIH), and City University of New York (CUNY) were also investigating whether Cassava or individuals manipulated data. In June 2024, Hoau-Yan Wang was charged by the DOJ with fraud for falsifying data on $16 million in NIH grant applications related to simufilam.

As of July 2022, Cassava Sciences and papers published by Burns and Wang were under investigation by the U.S. Justice Department; Cassava denies any wrongdoing. Two papers were retracted by journals and expressions of concern were issued for other papers. The U.S. Securities and Exchange Commission (SEC), the U.S. National Institutes of Health (NIH), and City University of New York (CUNY) were also investigating allegations of manipulated data.

In October 2023, a leaked CUNY report indicated that they could obtain none of Wang's original data, which meant that they were unable to either prove or disprove allegations that the images were improperly manipulated; they paused the investigation a few weeks later over concerns about confidentiality and integrity of the process.

Research papers demonstrating the mechanism of action of simufilam contained an error of units in methods (one instance of milligrams noted as micrograms) and erroneous duplication of images, but neither journal found evidence of data manipulation that was previously alleged. Two papers unrelated to Alzheimer's disease that reported FLNA binding by certain opioid antagonists and FLNA's role in opioid tolerance and dependence were retracted for "similarities in background pixels" in western blot images without evidence of data manipulation.

Lawrence Sterling Honig, professor of neurology at Columbia University Irving Medical Center, had remarked on Burns and Wang's claims: "But in fact, all the evidence seems to be from this [Wang's] lab." Robert Howard, professor of psychiatry at the University College London, is concerned on the lack of placebo and small sample size and said that the research "at the very least is implausible". Thomas C. Südhof, Nobel laureate neuroscientist at Stanford University, also commented: "The overall conclusions with regard to Alzheimer's disease make no sense to me whatsoever... [The findings of Burns and Wang] are not in the mainstream of the field, and to me they seem implausible and contrived."

In June 2024, a grand jury indicted Wang on charges of falsifying data to obtain grants. For a trial slated to begin in October 2025, CUNY released a report claiming scientific misconduct by Wang could not be proven. The United States Department of Justice dropped the charges "with prejudice" at midnight before trial was scheduled to begin.
