= FDA citizen petition =

American legal procedure

An FDA citizen petition is a process provided by the United States Food and Drug Administration (FDA) for individuals and community organizations to make requests to the FDA for changes to health policy. It is described in Title 21 of the Code of Federal Regulations (21 CFR Part 10).

Pharmaceutical companies routinely use FDA citizen petitions to delay the entry of generic drugs into the United States marketplace. Companies use this to counter the parts of the Drug Price Competition and Patent Term Restoration Act, which make generic drugs more available.

In 2016, Pharmaceutical Research and Manufacturers of America requested various changes to the FDA petition process, which the FDA declined. In November 2016, the FDA updated the citizen petition process.

Most citizen petitions are filed by drug companies against competing drug companies.

Innovator companies may also present arguments to the FDA that the Abbreviated New Drug Application (ANDA) should not be accepted by filing a "citizen petition" with the FDA. Citizen petitions are part of the basic law governing everything the FDA does—at any time, any "interested person" can request that the FDA "issue, amend, or revoke a regulation or order," or "take or refrain from taking any other form of administrative action."

Originally, there was no deadline by which the FDA had to respond to citizen petitions filed to protest ANDAs, leading to significant delays in approving generics. In 2007, the law was amended to include a new section, Section 505(q), in the part of the federal code created by the Hatch-Waxman Act; this section said that the FDA could not delay approving an ANDA due to concerns raised in a citizen petition unless the delay was "necessary to protect public health issues"; it also mandated that the FDA needed to respond to a petition within 180 days—this was shortened to 150 days via a 2011 amendment. In 2014, the FDA issued guidance to industry about submitting citizen petitions and how it would consider them.
