= Expression of concern =

Publisher's note regarding concerns raised about a publication

In academic publishing, an expression of concern is a notice issued by a publisher against a particular publication, warning that it may contain errors or be otherwise untrustworthy.

== Definitions ==
Expressions of concern are part of the post-publication process used to maintain the integrity of the scientific record. They are typically issued when credible allegations regarding the validity or ethics of a study arise, but conclusive evidence is not yet available to justify a retraction or correction. In such cases, journal editors may publish a statement indicating that concerns have been raised and that the article is under investigation.

== Guidelines and editorial practices ==
Publishing practices around expressions of concern vary between journals and publishers. The Committee on Publication Ethics (COPE) recommends their use when:

- There is inconclusive evidence of research or publication misconduct.
- There is evidence that the findings are unreliable, but the authors' institution has not investigated or refused to investigate.
- An investigation is ongoing and a judgment is not yet available.

The International Committee of Medical Journal Editors also acknowledges the role of expressions of concern in its 2019 recommendations that a publisher may choose to issue an expression of concern while an investigation of alleged scientific misconduct is ongoing, and pending its outcome.

COPE further advises that expressions of concern should be clearly labeled, linked to the original article, and should explain the reasons for the concern without making definitive conclusions.

== See also ==
- Erratum
- Post-publication peer review
- Retractions in academic publishing
