= Neurobiology of Aging =

Scientific journal

- Discipline: Aging, neuroscience
- Language: English
- Edited by: Peter R. Rapp

Publication details
- History: 1980–present
- Publisher: Elsevier
- Frequency: Monthly
- Impact factor: 3.3 (2024)

Standard abbreviations
- ISO 4: Neurobiol. Aging

Indexing
- CODEN: NEAGDO
- ISSN: 0197-4580 (print); 1558-1497 (web)
- LCCN: 80647928
- OCLC no.: 06035686

Links
- Journal homepage; Online access

Neurobiology of Aging is a peer-reviewed monthly scientific journal published by Elsevier. The editor-in-chief is Peter R. Rapp. Neurobiology of Aging publishes research in which the primary emphasis addresses the mechanisms of nervous system-changes during aging and in age-related diseases. Approaches are behavioral, biochemical, cellular, molecular, morphological, neurological, neuropathological, pharmacological, and physiological.

== Abstracting and indexing ==
Neurobiology of Aging is abstracted and indexed in

- BIOSIS,
- Current Contents/Life Sciences,
- EMBASE,
- MEDLINE,
- PsycINFO,
- Research Alert,
- Science Citation Index,
- Scopus.

According to the Journal Citation Reports, Neurobiology of Aging has a 2024 impact factor of 3.3.
